= List of Hindi films of 1992 =

The films produced by the Bollywood film industry based in Mumbai in 1992.

== Highest-grossing films ==
No.	Title	Cast
1.	Beta	Anil Kapoor, Madhuri Dixit, Aruna Irani
2.	Deewana	Rishi Kapoor, Divya Bharti, Shah Rukh Khan
3.	Khuda Gawah	Amitabh Bachchan, Sridevi, Nagarjuna, Shilpa Shirodkar, Danny Denzongpa
4.	Shola Aur Shabnam	Govinda, Divya Bharti, Mohnish Behl, Gulshan Grover
5.	Vishwatma	Sunny Deol, Naseeruddin Shah, Chunky Panday, Divya Bharti, Sonam, Gulshan Grover, Sharat Saxena, Amrish Puri
6.	Khiladi	Akshay Kumar, Ayesha Jhulka, Deepak Tijori, Sabeeha, Johnny Lever
7.	Jo Jeeta Wohi Sikandar	Aamir Khan, Ayesha Jhulka, Deepak Tijori, Pooja Bedi, Mamik Singh
8.	Jigar	Ajay Devgn, Karishma Kapoor, Paresh Rawal
9.	Yalgaar	Feroz Khan, Sanjay Dutt, Manisha Koirala, Nagma, Kabir Bedi
10.	Bol Radha Bol	Rishi Kapoor, Juhi Chawla, Shakti Kapoor, Kader Khan, Kiran Kumar
11.	Jaan Tere Naam	Ronit Roy, Farheen
12.	Angaar	Jackie Shroff, Nana Patekar, Dimple Kapadia
13.	Police Officer	Jackie Shroff, Karishma Kapoor
14.	Tahalka	Dharmendra, Naseeruddin Shah, Aditya Pancholi, Javed Jaffrey, Amrish Puri
15.	Nishchaiy	Vinod Khanna, Salman Khan, Karishma Kapoor

== January–March ==
Opening		Title	Director	Cast	Genre
J A N	3	Ajeeb Dastan Hain Yeh	J. Om Prakash	Roshini Jaffery, Suraj Chaddha	Romance
J A N	10	Yaad Rakhegi Duniya	Deepak Anand	Aditya Pancholi, Rukhsar Rehman	Romance
J A N	24	Vishwatma	Rajiv Rai	Sunny Deol, Naseeruddin Shah, Chunky Pandey, Divya Bharti, Sonam, Jyotsna Singh, Amrish Puri, Gulshan Grover, Raza Murad	Action
J A N	24	Vansh	Pappu Verma	Siddharth Ray, Sudesh Berry, Ekta Sohini, Anupam Kher	Action
J A N	31	Dil Ka Kya Kasoor	Lawrence D'Souza	Divya Bharti, Prithvi, Suresh Oberoi, Manjeet Kullar, Laxmikant Berde	Romance
J A N	31	Insaaf Ki Devi	S. A. Chandrasekhar	Jeetendra, Rekha, Shakti Kapoor, Kader Khan	Action
F E B	7	Shola Aur Shabnam	David Dhawan	Govinda, Divya Bharti, Anupam Kher, Gulshan Grover, Mohnish Behl, Bindu, Alok Nath, Reema Lagoo, Guddi Maruti	Comedy, Action
F E B	7	Raat	Ram Gopal Verma	Revathi, Rohini Hattangadi	Horror
F E B	7	Mere Sajana Saath Nibhana	Rajesh Vakil	Mithun Chakraborty, Juhi Chawla, Shantipriya, Prem Chopra	Drama
F E B	7	Meera Ka Mohan	K. Ravi Shankar	Avinash Wadhawan, Ashwini Bhave, Pran	Romance
F E B	14	Panaah	Krishnakant Pandya	Naseeruddin Shah, Siddharth Ray, Pallavi Joshi, Kiran Kumar	Drama
F E B	14	Suryavanshi	Rakesh Kumar	Salman Khan, Sheeba Akashdeep, Amrita Singh	Drama
F E B	14	Current	K. Hariharan	Om Puri, Deepti Naval, Shriram Lagoo, Savita Prabhune	Drama
F E B	14	I Love You	T. L. V. Prasad	Prashanth, Tanuja, Reema Lagoo	Romance
F E B	21	Adharm	Aziz Sejawal	Sanjay Dutt, Shatrughan Sinha, Anita Raj, Shabana Azmi	Action
F E B	21	Jaan Tere Naam	Deepak Balraj Vij	Ronit Roy, Farheen	Romance
M A R	4	Sahebzaade	Ajay Kashyap	Sanjay Dutt, Aditya Pancholi, Neelam Kothari, Gulshan Grover	Action, Romance
M A R	27	Qaid Mein Hai Bulbul	Ravindra Peepat	Bhagyashree, Himalaya, Gulshan Grover, Reema Lagoo	Romance
M A R	27	Yudhpath	Ravi Ravan	Siddharth Ray, Sudesh Berry, Mohnish Behl, Ekta Sohini	Action
M A R	27	Ganga Ka Vachan	Gulshan Ashte	Siddharth Ray, Upasana Singh	Action

== April–June ==
Opening		Title	Director	Cast	Genre
A P R	3	Beta	Inder Kumar	Anil Kapoor, Madhuri Dixit, Aruna Irani, Anupam Kher	Drama
A P R	3	Virodhi	Rajkumar Kohli	Dharmendra, Armaan Kohli, Sunil Dutt, Anita Raj, Harsha Mehra	Action
A P R	10	Sarphira	Ashok Gaekwad	Sanjay Dutt, Sumeet Saigal, Kimi Katkar, Madhavi,	Action
A P R	10	Dharavi	Sudhir Mishra	Om Puri, Shabana Azmi, Madhuri Dixit, Anil Kapoor	Social
A P R	17	Saatwan Aasman	Mahesh Bhatt	Pooja Bhatt, Vivek Mushran, Shekhar Kapur, Tanvi Azmi	Romance
A P R	24	Mr Bond	Raj N. Sippy	Akshay Kumar, Sheeba Akashdeep, Pankaj Dheer, Laxmikant Berde	Action
M A Y	1	Ghazab Tamasha	Ranjeet	Rahul Roy, Anu Aggarwal	Romance, Comedy
M A Y	8	Khuda Gawah	Mukul S. Anand	Amitabh Bachchan, Sridevi, Danny Denzongpa, Nagarjuna, Shilpa Shirodkar, Kiran Kumar,	Drama
M A Y	15	Inteha Pyar Ki	J. K. Bihari	Rishi Kapoor, Rukhsar Rehman	Romance, Drama
M A Y	15	Zindagi Ek Juaa	Prakash Mehra	Anil Kapoor, Madhuri Dixit, Anupam Kher, Amrish Puri, Suresh Oberoi, Shakti Kapoor	Crime, Drama
M A Y	21	Jai Kaali	Nikhil Saini	Jeetendra, Hema Malini, Saeed Jaffrey	Horror, Thriller
M A Y	22	Jo Jeeta Wohi Sikander	Mansoor Khan	Aamir Khan, Ayesha Julka, Deepak Tijori, Pooja Bedi	Sport, Drama
M A Y	22	Jaan Se Pyaara	Anand	Govinda, Divya Bharti, Kiran Kumar, Aruna Irani	Action, Drama
M A Y	22	Humlaa	N. Chandra	Dharmendra, Anil Kapoor, Meenakshi Seshadri, Kimi Katkar	Action, Drama
M A Y	22	Tyagi	K. C. Bokadia	Rajnikant, Jaya Prada, Bhagyashree, Himalaya	Action, Drama
J U N	5	Khiladi	Abbas Mustan	Akshay Kumar, Ayesha Julka, Deepak Tijori, Shakti Kapoor, Prem Chopra	Musical, Thriller
J U N	5	Police Officer	Ashok Gaikwad	Jackie Shroff, Karisma Kapoor, Deepak Tijori	Action, Drama
J U N	12	Prem Deewane	Sachin	Jackie Shroff, Madhuri Dixit, Vivek Mushran, Pooja Bhatt, Prem Chopra	Romance
J U N	12	Laat Saab	Sunil Agnihotri	Jackie Shroff, Neelam Kothari, Mohsin Khan	Suspense
J U N	18	Ek Ladka Ek Ladki	Vijay Sadanah	Salman Khan, Neelam Kothari	Romance, Drama
J U N	18	Kasak	K. Bapaiah	Rishi Kapoor, Neelam Kothari, Chunky Pandey	Romance, Drama
J U N	25	Deewana	Raj Kanwar	Rishi Kapoor, Divya Bharti, Shahrukh Khan	Romance, Drama

== July–September ==
Opening		Title	Director	Cast	Genre
J U L	3	Jaagruti	Suresh Krissna	Salman Khan, Karisma Kapoor	Action, Drama
J U L	10	Parda Hai Parda	K. Bapaiah	Chunky Pandey, Meena	Drama
J U L	10	Chamatkar	Rajiv Mehra	Naseeruddin Shah, Shah Rukh Khan, Urmila Matondkar	Comedy
J U L	10	Aaj Ka Goonda Raj	Ravi Raja Pinisetty	Chiranjeevi, Meenakshi Seshadri, Raj Babbar	Crime, Action
J U L	10	Honeymoon	Surendra Mohan	Rishi Kapoor, Varsha Usgaonkar, Ashwini Bhave	Romance
J U L	10	Mashooq	Mirza Brothers	Ayesha Julka, Ayub Khan	Romance
J U L	17	Payal	Mahendra Shah	Bhagyashree, Himalaya	Romance
J U L	17	Zulm Ki Hukumat	Bharat Rangachary	Dharmendra, Moushumi Chatterjee, Govinda, Kimi Katkar	Action
J U L	17	Nishchaiy	Esmayeel Shroff	Salman Khan, Vinod Khanna, Karisma Kapoor, Moushumi Chatterjee	Romance
J U L	24	Sapne Sajan Ke	Lawrence D'Souza	Jackie Shroff, Rahul Roy, Karisma Kapoor, Gulshan Grover	Musical, Romance
J U L	24	Police Aur Mujrim	K. C. Bokadia	Raaj Kumar, Vinod Khanna, Meenakshi Seshadri, Nagma, Avinash Wadhawan	Crime, Drama
J U L	31	Bekhudi	Rahul Rawail	Kajol, Kamal Sadanah, Ajay Mankotia, Tanuja	Musical, Romance
J U L	31	Humshakal	Kalpataru	Vinod Khanna, Meenakshi Seshadri, Nagma, Avinash Wadhawan	Crime, Drama
J U L	31	Radha Ka Sangam	Kirti Kumar	Govinda, Juhi Chawla	Romance
A U G	7	Tahalka	Anil Sharma	Dharmendra, Naseeruddin Shah, Aditya Pancholi, Javed Jaffrey, Ekta Sohini, Pallavi Joshi, Shikha Swaroop, Sonu Walia	Action
A U G	14	Khel	Rakesh Roshan	Anil Kapoor, Madhuri Dixit, Sonu Walia	Comedy, Drama
A U G	14	Deedar	Pramod Chakravorty	Akshay Kumar, Karisma Kapoor, Anupam Kher	Romance, Drama
A U G	14	Mehboob Mere Mehboob	Gurdeep Singh	Sujoy Mukherjee, Pratibha Sinha, Mohnish Bahl, Gulshan Grover	Romance
A U G	21	Bol Radha Bol	David Dhawan	Rishi Kapoor, Juhi Chawla, Mohnish Bahl	Romance, Comedy
A U G	21	Kal Ki Awaz	Ravi Chopra	Dharmendra, Amrita Singh, Pratibha Sinha, Raj Babbar	Social Drama
A U G	28	Jeena Marna Tere Sang	Vijay Reddy	Sanjay Dutt, Raveena Tandon	Action
A U G	28	Isi Ka Naam Zindagi	Kalidas	Aamir Khan, Farha Naaz, Pran	Comedy
S E P	4	Heer Ranjha	Harmesh Malhotra	Anil Kapoor, Sridevi, Pran	Romance
S E P	4	Aasman Se Gira	Pankaj Parashar	Raghubir Yadav, Kalpana Iyer, Anil Kapoor, Sridevi	Fantasy
S E P	4	Sone Ki Zanjeer	Shiv Kumar	Aasif Sheikh, Varsha Usgaonkar, Alok Nath	Romance, Drama
S E P	11	Angaar	Shashilal K. Nair	Jackie Shroff, Dimple Kapadia, Nana Patekar, Om Puri, Kader Khan, Mazhar Khan	Romance
S E P	11	Bewaffa Se Waffa	Saawan Kumar Tak	Juhi Chawla, Vivek Mushran, Nagma	Romance, Drama
S E P	11	Balwaan	Deepak Anand	Divya Bharti, Sunil Shetty, Danny Den	Action
S E P	11	Waqt Ka Badshah	Manmohan	Dharmendra, Akash Deep, Moon Moon Sen	Action
S E P	18	Junoon	Mahesh Bhatt	Pooja Bhatt, Rahul Roy	Romance, Horror
S E P	18	Sangeet	K. Vishwanath	Jackie Shroff, Madhuri Dixit	Romance, Drama
S E P	25	Dilwale Kabhi Na Hare	C. Menon	Rahul Roy, Nagma, Prithvi, Varsha Usgaonkar	Romance, Drama

== October–December ==
Opening		Title	Director	Cast	Genre
O C T	2	Dushman Zamana	Jagdish A. Sharma	Divya Bharti, Armaan Kohli, Paresh Rawal	Romance
O C T	9	Suraj Ka Satvan Ghoda	Shyam Benegal	Rajit Kapur, Amrish Puri, Neena Gupta, Rajeshwari Sachdev, Pallavi Joshi	Drama
O C T	15	Yeh Raat Phir Na Aayegi	Nusrat Sayeed	Jeetendra, Meenakshi Seshadri	Thriller
O C T	23	Drohi	Ram Gopal Varma	Nagarjuna, Urmila Matondkar, Danny Denzongpa	Crime, Thriller
O C T	23	Yalgaar	Feroz Khan	Sanjay Dutt, Feroz Khan, Manisha Koirala, Nagma, Mukesh Khanna	Action
O C T	23	Jigar	Farogue Siddique	Ajay Devgn, Karisma Kapoor	Action, Musical
O C T	30	Muskurahat	Priyadarshan	Revathi, Jay Mehra, Amrish Puri	Comedy, Romance
N O V	6	Apradhi	K. Ravi Shankar	Anil Kapoor, Vijayshanti, Chunky Pandey, Shilpa Shirodkar	Crime, Action
N O V	6	Baaz	S. Subhash	Govinda, Sonam	Crime, Action
N O V	13	Ghar Jamai	Arun Bhatt	Mithun Chakraborty, Varsha Usgaonkar	Drama
N O V	13	Raju Ban Gaya Gentleman	Aziz Mirza	Juhi Chawla, Shahrukh Khan, Amrita Singh, Nana Patekar	Romance, Drama
N O V	20	Geet	Partho Ghosh	Divya Bharti, Avinash Wadhawan, Shakti Kapoor	Romance, Drama
N O V	27	Umar 55 Ki Dil Bachpan Ka	Ajay Mehra	Chandni, Akshay Anand, Kader Khan	Comedy
N O V	27	Abhi Abhi	S. P. Rajaram	Rubaina Khan, Mohnish Bahl	Romance, Drama
D E C	25	Balmaa	Lawrence D'Souza	Ayesha Jhulka, Avinash Wadhavan, Saeed Jaffrey	Romance, Drama
D E C	25	Dil Aashna Hai	Hema Malini	Divya Bharti, Dimple Kapadia, Shah Rukh Khan, Amrita Singh, Sonu Walia, Jeetendra, Farida Jalal, Kabir Bedi, Mithun Chakraborty, Raza Murad	Drama
D E C	25	Khule-Aam	Arun Dutt	Dharmendra, Neelam Kothari, Chunky Pandey	Action

- List of Hindi films of 1991
- List of Hindi films of 1993
