= List of Hindi films of the 1990s =

A list of films produced by the Bollywood film industry based in Mumbai in the 1990s:

== 1990 ==
Title	Director	Cast	Genre	Notes
Aag Ka Dariya	S.V. Rajendra Singh	Dilip Kumar, Rekha, Padmini Kolhapure, Amrita Singh		
Aashiqui	Mahesh Bhatt	Rahul Roy, Anu Aggarwal	Romance	
Awaargi	Mahesh Bhatt	Anil Kapoor, Govinda, Paresh Rawal, Meenakshi Sheshadri	Thriller	
Baaghi: A Rebel for Love	Deepak Shivdasani	Salman Khan, Nagma	Action, Romance	
Dil	Indra Kumar	Aamir Khan, Madhuri Dixit, Anupam Kher, Saeed Jaffrey	Comedy, Romance	Madhuri Dixit won Best Actress
Jawani Zindabad	Arun Bhatt	Aamir Khan, Farha Naaz, Javed Jaffrey, Kader Khan	Romance	
Deewana Mujh Sa Nahin	Nageshwara Rao	Aamir Khan, Madhuri Dixit	Romance	
Ghayal	Rajkumar Santoshi	Sunny Deol, Meenakshi Seshadri,	Thriller	Winner, Filmfare Award for Best Film Best Actor for Sunny Deol
Izzatdaar	K. Bapaiah	Shakti Kapoor, Dilip Kumar	Drama, Thriller	
Maha-Sangram	Mukul S. Anand	Madhuri Dixit, Vinod Khanna, Govinda	Drama	
Swarg	David Dhawan	Rajesh Khanna, Govinda, Juhi Chawla	Drama	
Zakhmi Zameen	Mahendra Shah	Ishrat Ali	Drama	
Agneepath	Mukul S. Anand	Amitabh Bachchan, Mithun Chakraborty	Action, Crime, Drama	

Maine Pyar kiya 1990 Salman khan Bhagyashree debut film romantic

== 1991 ==
Title	Director	Cast	Genre	Notes
100 Days	Parto Ghosh	Jackie Shroff, Madhuri Dixit	Thriller	
Ajooba	Shashi Kapoor	Amitabh Bachchan, Rishi Kapoor, Dimple Kapadia	Fantasy adventure	
Dil Hai Ke Manta Nahin	Mahesh Bhatt	Aamir Khan, Pooja Bhatt	Romance	
Henna	Randhir Kapoor	Rishi Kapoor, Zeba Bakhtiar, Ashwini Bhave, Saeed Jaffrey	Romance, Drama	
Hum	Mukul S. Anand	Amitabh Bachchan, Rajnikant, Govinda, Shilpa Shirodkar, Kimi Katkar	Action, Drama	
Kurbaan	Deepak Bahry	Salman Khan, Ayesha Jhulka	Romance	Similar to West Side Story
Lamhe	Yash Chopra	Anil Kapoor, Sridevi, Waheeda Rehman, Anupam Kher	Romance, Drama	Winner, Filmfare Award for Best Film
Love	Suresh Krishna	Salman Khan, Revathi, Amjad Khan	Romance	
Patthar Ke Phool	Anant Balani	Salman Khan, Raveena Tandon, Saeed Jaffrey	Romance, Thriller	First film for Raveena Tandon
Phool Aur Kaante	Sandesh Kohli	Ajay Devgan, Madhoo, Aruna Irani, Jagdeep, Amrish Puri	Thriller	First film for Ajay Devgan
Prahaar: The Final Attack	Nana Patekar	Nana Patekar, Madhuri Dixit, Dimple Kapadia, Gautam Joglekar	Action	
Saajan	Lawerence D'Souza	Sanjay Dutt, Salman Khan, Madhuri Dixit	Romance	
Sadak	Mahesh Bhatt	Sanjay Dutt, Pooja Bhatt, Deepak Tijori	Romance	
Sanam Bewafa	Saawan Kumar	Salman Khan, Chandni	Romance	
Saudagar	Subhash Ghai	Raaj Kumar, Dilip Kumar, Manisha Koirala	Romance, Drama	

== 1992 ==
Title	Director	Cast	Genre	Notes
Adharm	Aziz Sajawalq	Shabana Azmi, Sunjay Dutt	Thriller	
Beta	Indra Kumar	Anil Kapoor, Madhuri Dixit	Drama	
Bekhudi	Rahul Rawail	Kajol, Kamal Sadanah, Ajay Mankotia, Tanuja, Vijayendra Ghatge	Romance	Kajol's first film
Chamatkar	Rajiv Mehra	Shah Rukh Khan, Urmila Matondkar, Naseeruddin Shah, Shammi Kapoor	Fantasy, Comedy	
Deewana	Raj Kanwar	Shah Rukh Khan, Rishi Kapoor, Divya Bharti	Romance	Shahrukh Khan's film debut
Dil Aashna Hai	Hema Malini	Jeetendra, Mithun Chakraborty, Amrita Singh, Dimple Kapadia, Sonu Walia, Divya Bharti, Shahrukh Khan	Romance	
Dil Ka Kya Kasoor	Lawerence D'Souza	Prithvi, Divya Bharti	Romance	
Ek Ladka Ek Ladki	Lawrence D'Souza	Salman Khan, Neelam, Anupam Kher	Thriller	
Jaan Se Pyaara	Govinda, Divya Bharti	Crime, Drama		
Jaan Tere Naam	Deepak Balraj Vij	Ronit Roy, Farheen	Romance	
Jo Jeeta Wohi Sikandar	Mansoor Khan	Aamir Khan, Pooja Bedi	Drama, Romance	Winner, Filmfare Award for Best Film
Khiladi	Abbas Mustan	Akshay Kumar, Deepak Tijori, Ayesha Jhulka, Sabeeha	Thriller	
Khuda Gawah	Mukul S. Anand	Amitabh Bachchan, Sridevi, Akkineni Nagarjuna, Shilpa Shirodkar, Danny Denzongpa, Kiran Kumar	Action, Romance	
Parampara	Yash Chopra	Sunil Dutt, Vinod Khanna, Ashwini Bhave, Ramya Krishna, Aamir Khan, Saif Ali Khan, Raveena Tandon, Anupam Kher and Neelam	Romance	Saif Ali Khan's debut film
Raju Ban Gaya Gentleman	Aziz Mirza	Nana Patekar, Shahrukh Khan, Juhi Chawla, Amrita Singh	Romance	
Suraj Ka Satvan Ghoda	Shyam Benegal	Rajit Kapur, Rajeshwari Sachdev, Pallavi Joshi, Neena Gupta and Amrish Puri		
Shola Aur Shabnam	David Dhawan	Govinda, Divya Bharati, and Anupam Kher	Comedy	
Vishwatma	Rajiv Rai	Sunny Deol, Naseeruddin Shah, Sonam, Chunkey Pandey, Divya Bharati	Crime, Action	Divya Bharati's debut

== 1993 ==
Title	Director	Cast	Genre	Notes
Sainik	sikander bharti	akshay kumar, ashwini bhave, alok nath, anupam kher	drama	
Aaina	Deepak Sareen	Jackie Shroff, Juhi Chawla, Amrita Singh	Romance	
Aankhen	David Dhawan	Govinda, Chunky Pandey	Comedy	
Aashiq Awara	Umesh Mehra	Saif Ali Khan, Mamta Kulkarni	Romance	Saif Ali Khan won Best Debut for this movie
Anari	K. Muralimohana Rao	Karishma Kapoor, Daggubati Venkatesh		
Balmaa	Lawrence D'Souza	Avinash Wadhavan, Ayesha Jhulka	Drama	
Baazigar	Abbas Mustan	Shah Rukh Khan, Kajol, Shilpa Shetty	Thriller	Winner of Best Actor- Shah Rukh Khan; Shilpa Shetty's first movie
Damini	Rajkumar Santoshi	Rishi Kapoor, Sunny Deol, Meenakshi Sheshadri, Kulbhushan Kharbanda		
Darr	Yash Chopra	Sunny Deol, Juhi Chawla, Shah Rukh Khan	Thriller	
Dil Tera Aashiq	Lawrence d'Souza	Salman Khan, Madhuri Dixit	Romance	
Gardish	Priyadarshan	Jackie Shroff, Dimple Kapadia	Crime	remake of Malayalam movie, Kireedam
Hum Hain Rahi Pyaar Ke	Mahesh Bhatt	Aamir Khan, Juhi Chawla	Romance	Chawla won Best Actress
Kabhi Haan Kabhi Naa	Kundan Shah	Shah Rukh Khan, Suchitra Krishnamoorthi	Romance	
Khalnayak	Subhash Ghai	Madhuri Dixit, Sanjay Dutt, Jackie Shroff	Action	
King Uncle	Rakesh Roshan	Jackie Shroff, Shah Rukh Khan, Niveditha Saraf	Drama	
Kshatriya	J.P. Dutta	Sunil Dutt, Dharmendra, Vinod Khanna, Sanjay Dutt, Sunny Deol	Action	
Maya Memsaab	Ketan Mehta	Deepa Sahi, Shah Rukh Khan, Farooq Shaikh, Raj Babbar	Drama	Shahrukh Khan performed a nude sex scene with Deepa Sahi and he kissed on her lips in this movie
Rudaali	Kalpana Lajmi	Dimple Kapadia, Raakhee, Amjad Khan	Drama	Dimple won a NFA
Rang	Talat Jani	Jeetendra, Amrita Singh, Kamal Sadanah, Divya Bharti, Ayesha Jhulka	Romance	
Sardar	Ketan Mehta	Paresh Rawal	Biography	Biopic of Sardar Vallabhbhai Patel

== 1994 ==
Title	Director	Cast	Genre	Notes
Aag	K. Ravi Shankar	Shilpa Shetty, Govinda, Sonali Bendre	Romance	Sonali Bendre's debut movie
Amaanat	Raj N Sippy	Sanjay Dutt, Heera Rajagopal, Akshay Kumar	Action & Adventure	
1942: A Love Story	Vidhu Vinod Chopra	Anil Kapoor, Manisha Koirala, Jackie Shroff, Anupam Kher, Pran, Danny Denzongpa	Romance, Social	
Andaz Apna Apna	Rajkumar Santoshi	Aamir Khan. Salman Khan, Raveena Tandon, Karishma Kapoor	Comedy	
Anjaam	Rahul Rawail	Madhuri Dixit, Shah Rukh Khan	Drama, Thriller	
Bandit Queen	Shekhar Kapur	Seema Biswas	Biography, Social	
Dulaara	Vimal Kumar	Govinda, Karishma Kapoor	Thriller	
Dilwale		Ajay Devgan, Sunil Shetty, Paresh Rawal, Raveena Tandon	Romance	
Ekka Raja Rani	Afjal Ahmed Khan	Govinda, Vinod Khanna, Ayesha Zulka	Romance	
The Gentleman	Mahesh Bhatt	Juhi Chawla, Chiranjeevi	Action	
Hum Aapke Hain Koun...!	Sooraj R. Barjatya	Salman Khan, Madhuri Dixit	Romance	Madhuri Dixit Best Actress Winner and Best Film
Hum Hain Bemisaal	Deepak Bahry	Akshay Kumar, Suniel Shetty, Shilpa Shirodkar, Madhu		
Imtihaan	Harry Baweja	Saif Ali Khan, Raveena Tandon, Sunny Deol	Drama	
Khuddar	Iqbal Durrani	Govinda, Karishma Kapoor	Action	
Laqshya	Bhagvant Thakur	Ronit Roy, Priyanka, Kiran Kumar, Paresh Rawal, Tinnu Anand, Dalip Tahil	Action & Adventure	
Main Khiladi Tu Anari	Sameer Malkan	Akshay Kumar, Saif Ali Khan, Shilpa Shetty, Neelam Kothari	Action, Comedy	
Mohra	Rajiv Rai	Sunil Shetty, Akshay Kumar, Paresh Rawal, Raveena Tandon, Naseeruddin Shah	Action	
Raja Babu	David Dhawan	Karishma Kapoor, Govinda	Comedy	
Yeh Dillagi	Naresh Malhotra	Akshay Kumar, Saif Ali Khan, Kajol	Romance	

== 1995 ==
Title	Director	Cast	Genre	Notes
Aatank Hi Aatank	Dilip Shankar	Aamir Khan, Juhi Chawla	Crime Romance	
Aazmayish				
Akele Hum Akele Tum	Mansoor Khan	Aamir Khan, Manisha Koirala	Romance	
Barsaat	Rajkumar Santoshi	Bobby Deol, Twinkle Khanna	Romance	Debut film for both Bobby and Twinkle
Coolie No. 1	David Dhawan	Govinda, Karishma Kapoor	Comedy	
Criminal	Mahesh Bhatt	Nagarjuna, Manisha Koirala, Ramya Krishna, Nassar, Gulshan Grover, and Sharat Babu		remake of The Fugitive
Dilwale Dulhania Le Jayenge	Aditya Chopra	Shah Rukh Khan, Kajol	Romance	Winner, Best Movie and Best Actor Shah Rukh Khan
Guddu	Prem Lalwani	Mehmood, Shah Rukh Khan, Manisha Koirala	Drama	
Karan Arjun	Rakesh Roshan	Om Puri, Raakhee, Shah Rukh Khan, Salman Khan, Kajol, Mamta Kulkarni	Action	
Oh Darling! Yeh Hai India	Ketan Mehta	Shahrukh Khan, Deepa Sahi, Jaaved Jaffrey		
Raja	Indra Kumar	Sanjay Kapoor, Madhuri Dixit, Paresh Rawal, Mukesh Khanna and Dalip Tahil	Drama	Sanjay Kapoor's debut, Madhuri Dixit won Best Actress
Ram Jaane	Rajiv Mehra	Shah Rukh Khan, Juhi Chawla; Vivek Mushran	Drama	
Rangeela	Ram Gopal Varma	Aamir Khan, Urmila Matondkar, Jackie Shroff	Romance	
Trimurti	Mukul S. Anand	Shah Rukh Khan, Jackie Shroff, Anil Kapoor	Drama	
Yaraana	David Dhawan	Rishi Kapoor, Madhuri Dixit, Raj Babbar, Kader Khan and Shakti Kapoor	Romance	
Zamana Deewana	Ramesh Sippy	Shatrughan Sinha, Jeetendra, Shahrukh Khan, Raveena Tandon	Romance Drama	
Kartavya	Raj Kanwar	Sanjay Kapoor, Juhi Chawla	Action	
Sabse Bada Khiladi	Umesh Mehra	Akshay Kumar; Mamta Kulkarni; Mohnish Behl	Action	

== 1996 ==
Title	Director	Cast	Genre	Notes
Army	Raam Shetty	Sridevi, Danny Denzongpa, Mohnish Behl, Shah Rukh Khan	Drama	
Chaahat	Mahesh Bhatt	Shah Rukh Khan, Naseeruddin Shah, Anupam Kher	Drama, Comedy	
Daraar	Abbas-Mastan	Arbaaz Khan, Johnny Lever, Sushma Seth	Drama, Thriller	
Dushman Duniya Ka	Mehmood	Manzoor Ali, Farida Jalal, Jeetendra	Drama	
English Babu Desi Mem	Praveen Nischol	Shah Rukh Khan, Sonali Bendre	Romance	
Fire	Deepa Mehta	Nandita Das, Shabana Azmi	Social	First of Deepa Mehta's Elements trilogy
Jeet	Raj Kanwar	Sunny Deol, Karisma Kapoor and Salman Khan	Drama	
Khamoshi: The Musical	Sanjay Leela Bhansali	Salman Khan, Manisha Koirala, Nana Patekar	Social, Romance	
Khiladiyon Ka Khiladi	Umesh Mehra	Rekha, Akshay Kumar, Raveena Tandon	Action	
Maachis	Gulzar	Tabu, Chandrachur Singh	Crime, War	
The Making of the Mahatma	Shyam Benegal	Rajit Kapur	Biography	
Raja Hindustani	Dharmesh Darshan	Karisma Kapoor, Aamir Khan	Romance	
Raja Ki Aayegi Baraat	Ashok Gaekwad	Rani Mukerji, Shadaab Khan	Drama	Rani Mukerji's debut film
Saajan Chale Sasural	David Dhawan	Govinda, Karisma Kapoor	Comedy, Romance	

== 1997 ==
Title	Director	Cast	Genre	Notes
Aflatoon	Guddu Dhanoa	Akshay Kumar, Urmila Matondkar	Action	
Aur Pyaar Ho Gaya	Rahul Rawail	Bobby Deol, Aishwarya Rai	Romance	Aishwarya Rai's debut film
Border	J. P. Dutta	Sunny Deol, Jackie Shroff	War	
Daud	Ram Gopal Varma	Sanjay Dutt, Urmila Matondkar	Romance, Crime	
Deewana Mastana	David Dhawan	Anil Kapoor, Govinda, Juhi Chawla	Romantic comedy	Johnny Lever won Best Comedian
Dil To Pagal Hai	Yash Chopra	Shah Rukh Khan, Karisma Kapoor, Madhuri Dixit	Romance	Winner of best Film and Actor- Shah Rukh Khan and Actress Madhuri Dixit
Gudgudee	Basu Chatterjee	Anupam Kher, Pratibha Sinha, Jugal Hansraj	Romance	
Gupt: The Hidden Truth	Rajiv Rai	Bobby Deol, Manisha Koirala, Kajol	Thriller	Kajol first time Villain
Hameshaa	Sanjay Gupta	Saif Ali Khan, Kajol	Drama	
Hero No. 1	David Dhawan	Govinda, Karisma Kapoor	Comedy	
Ishq	Indra Kumar	Aamir Khan, Juhi Chawla, Ajay Devgan, Kajol	Romance, Comedy	
Judaai	Raj Kanwar	Anil Kapoor, Sridevi, Urmila Matondkar	Drama	Sridevi's final film
Judwaa	David Dhawan	Salman Khan, Karisma Kapoor	Comedy	
Koyla	Rakesh Roshan	Shahrukh Khan, Madhuri Dixit	Drama	
Mrityudand	Prakash Jha	Madhuri Dixit, Shabana Azmi	Drama	
Mrityudata	Mehul Kumar	Amitabh Bachchan, Dimple Kapadia	Action	
Mr. and Mrs. Khiladi	David Dhawan	Akshay Kumar, Juhi Chawla	Romantic comedy	
Pardes	Subhash Ghai	Shahrukh Khan, Mahima Chaudhary, Amrish Puri	Social Drama	Chaudhary's debut film
Sixth Happiness	Waris Hussein	Firdaus Kanga, Souad Faress, Khodus Wadia	Social	
Virasat	Priyadarshan	Anil Kapoor, Tabu, Amrish Puri	Drama	
Yes Boss	Aziz Mirza	Shahrukh Khan, Juhi Chawla	Comedy, Romance	
Yeshwant	Anil Matto	Nana Patekar, Madhoo, Atul Agnihotri, Mohan Joshi, Shafi Inamdar	Social	

== 1998 ==
Title	Director	Cast	Genre	Notes
1947 Earth	Deepa Mehta	Aamir Khan, Rahul Khanna, Nandita Das	Social	Rahul Khanna's debut film; second of Deepa Mehta's Elements trilogy
Achanak	Naresh Malhotra	Govinda, Manisha Koirala, Paresh Rawal	Drama	
Bade Miyan Chote Miyan	David Dhawan	Amitabh Bachchan, Govinda, Raveena Tandon	Comedy	
Bombay Boys	Kaizad Gustad	Tara Deshpande, Naveen Andrews, Rahul Bose, Alexander Gifford, Naseeruddin Shah, Roshan Seth	Comedy	
China Gate	Rajkumar Santoshi	Amrish Puri, Om Puri	Social, War	
Dil Se	Mani Ratnam	Shahrukh Khan, Manisha Koirala, Preity Zinta	Drama	Preity Zinta's debut film
Dulhe Raja	Harmesh Malhotra	Govinda, Raveena Tandon	Comedy	
Duplicate	Mahesh Bhatt	Shahrukh Khan, Juhi Chawla, Sonali Bendre	Comedy	
Dushman	Tanuja Chandra	Kajol, Sanjay Dutt, Ashutosh Rana	Thriller	
Ghulam	Vikram Bhatt	Aamir Khan, Rani Mukerji	Action	
Hyderabad Blues	Nagesh Kukunoor	Nagesh Kukunoor, Rajshri Nair	Social	
Jab Pyaar Kisise Hota Hai	Deepak Sareen	Salman Khan, Twinkle Khanna	Drama	
Kareeb	Vidhu Vinod Chopra	Bobby Deol, Neha		
Keemat – They Are Back	Sameer Malkan	Akshay Kumar, Saif Ali Khan, Raveena Tandon, Sonali Bendre	Action, Comedy	
Kuch Kuch Hota Hai	Karan Johar	Shah Rukh Khan, Kajol, Rani Mukerji	Drama, Romance	Winner, Best Film, Best Actor- Sharukh, Best Actress- Kajol Best Director- Karan Johar
Major Saab		Amitabh Bachchan, Ajay Devgan, Sonali Bendre		
Mehndi		Rani Mukerji, Faraaz Khan	Drama	
Pyaar Kiya To Darna Kya	Sohail Khan	Salman Khan, Kajol, Arbaaz Khan	Comedy, Romance	
Pyaar To Hona Hi Tha		Ajay Devgan, Kajol	Romance	
Qila	Umesh Mehra	Dilip Kumar; Rekha; Mukul Dev; Mamta Kulkarni	Thriller	Dilip Kumar's last film
Saaz				
Soldier	Abbas-Mustan	Bobby Deol, Preity Zinta	Romance, Action	
Train to Pakistan				

== 1999 ==
Title	Director	Cast	Genre	Notes
Aarzoo		Akshay Kumar, Madhuri Dixit, Saif Ali Khan	Drama	
Aa Ab Laut Chalen	Rishi Kapoor	Rajesh Khanna, Akshaye Khanna, Aishwarya Rai	Romance, Drama	
Baadshah	Abbas-Mustan	Shahrukh Khan, Twinkle Khanna	Action, Comedy	
Biwi No.1	David Dhawan	Salman Khan, Karisma Kapoor, Sushmita Sen	Comedy	
Dillagi	Sunny Deol	Sunny Deol, Bobby Deol, Urmila Matondkar	Drama	Sunny Deol's directiorial debut
Haseena Maan Jaayegi	David Dhawan	Govinda, Sanjay Dutt, Karisma Kapoor	Comedy	
Hello Brother		Salman Khan, Rani Mukerji, Arbaaz Khan	Comedy	
Hu Tu Tu	Gulzar	Nana Patekar, Tabu	Drama	
Hum Dil De Chuke Sanam	Sanjay Leela Bhansali	Salman Khan, Ajay Devgan, Aishwarya Rai	Drama	Winner, Best film
Hum Saath-Saath Hain: We Stand United		Salman Khan, Mohnish Bahl, Tabu, Saif Ali Khan, Karisma Kapoor, Sonali Bendre	Family Drama	
Hum Tum Pe Marte Hain		Govinda, Urmila Matondkar		
Lal Baadshah	K. C. Bokadia	Amitabh Bachchan; Shilpa Shetty; Manisha Koirala	Action	
Mann		Aamir Khan, Manisha Koirala	Romance, Drama	
Pyaar Mein Kabhi Kabhi		Sanjay Suri, Rinke Khanna		
Samar		Shyam Benegal		
Sangharsh	Tanuja Chandra	Akshay Kumar, Ashutosh Rana, Preity Zinta	Thriller, Drama	
Sarfarosh	John Matthew Matthan	Aamir Khan, Sonali Bendre	Action, Thriller	
Sooryavansham		Amitabh Bachchan, Soundarya	Drama	First and only Hindi film of late actress Soundarya
Sirf Tum		Sanjay Kapoor; Sushmita Sen; Priya Gill		
Taal	Subhash Ghai	Akshaye Khanna, Anil Kapoor, Aishwarya Rai	Musical, Romance	
Tere Mere Sapne	Joy Augustine	Chandrachur Singh; Arshad Warsi; Priya Gill; Simran		
Vaastav: The Reality	Mahesh Manjrekar	Sanjay Dutt; Namrata Shirodkar	Crime, Drama	

== See also ==
- Bollywood
- List of highest-grossing Bollywood films
- List of highest-grossing Indian films in overseas markets
- Category:Lists of Hindi films by year
