= Mafia (1996 film) =

1996 film by Aziz Sejawal

- Directed by: Aziz Sejawal
- Written by: Jalees Sherwani
- Screenplay by: Yunus Sajawal
- Produced by: Vijay Mehta
- Starring: Dharmendra; Aditya Pancholi; Jay Mehta; Somy Ali
- Edited by: Waman B. Bhosle
- Music by: Anand–Milind
- Production company: Prathima Films
- Distributed by: Films (1996 theatrical); B4U Entertainment (2006 Canadian TV)
- Release date: 24 May 1996 (India)
- Running time: 141 minutes
- Country: India
- Language: Hindi

Mafia is a 1996 Indian-Hindi-language action crime film directed by Aziz Sejawal. It stars Dharmendra, Aditya Pancholi, Jay Mehta, Somy Ali, Gulshan Grover, Mohan Joshi and Raza Murad. The film was praised for its action sequences and cast performances, and it was declared a box office hit. The film is an unofficial remake of the 1993 Malayalam film of the same name.

== Plot ==
Gawda is an influential crime boss involved in illegal supply of arms and drug smuggling activities in Mumbai, and also uses his influence to thwart communal riots and release convict prisoners. Having learnt the rules of the crime syndicate, Gawda's ex-henchman, Moosa, expresses his animosity toward Gawda and decides to start his own syndicate business. However, Gawda kills Moosa and his daughter, but their deaths become the headlines in the newspaper.

The commissioner assigns Inspector Bhagat Singh to investigate the case, but Gawda later kills him with DCP Pawar's help. After learning of his death, Bhagat's brothers, Ajit, an army soldier, and Jai, an unemployed man, decide to take vengeance on Gawda and the police corruption. How the brothers complete their vengeance forms the rest of the plot.

== Background ==
This film is heavily influenced by 1990s Hollywood action films, which often feature a common theme of police corruption and a mafia dominating the government, but it uses a comedic style. The music for the film is by the famous duo Anand–Milind, with lyrics written by Sameer. The film features songs such as "Dil Mera Deewana Dhahdke", "Duniya Nazaray", "Yeh Dil Yeh Paagal Dil" and "Is Ladki Ne Mera". The film premiered on 24 May 1996 and was released by Prathima Films. It has since been released on DVD by Eros Entertainment.

== Cast ==
- Dharmendra as Fauji Ajit Singh
- Aditya Pancholi as Inspector Bhagat Singh
- Jay Mehta as Jai Singh
- Somy Ali as Kiran Pawar
- Charan Raj as Gawda
- Babu Antony as Chhote
- Gulshan Grover as Parab Anna
- Pramod Moutho as Minister Praja Swami
- Raza Murad as Police Commissioner Pawar
- Mohan Joshi as DCP Bapat
- Ishrat Ali as Moosa
- Harish Patel as Kalyanji Bhai Matke
- Subbiraj as Acharya
- Ali Asgar as Jai's Friend
- Arun Bakshi as John T. Dalla
- Siddhant as Gawda gang member
- Sanjeeva as Madan Kavva
- Ramesh Goyal as Praja Swami's driver
- Ahmed Khan as Military Official AK Malhotra
- Mehmood Junior as Hariya
- Ghanashyam Nayak as Constable
- Robert as Gawda gang member
- Kishore Bhanushali as Constable in Bhagat Singh's station

== Soundtrack ==
The movie's soundtrack album, composed by Anand–Milind, featured several striking songs formulated by Sameer and performed by some big-time playback singers of the period, notably Kumar Sanu, Alka Yagnik, and a few others. The movie has pleasant tracks; "Dil Mera Deewana Dhadke" is a fine sensual number with analogous beats of percussion instruments. The track is peculiar to steamy numbers presented during that phase of Bollywood, with slow and measured use of instruments, chiefly tabla, as an example, in the song Roop Suhana Lagta Hai.

#	Title	Singer(s)
1	"Yeh Dil Yeh Pagal Dil"	Alka Yagnik, Kumar Sanu
2	"Mafia Mafia"	Arun Bakshi, Usha Uthup
3	"Is Ladki Ne Mera Dil Cheena"	Abhijeet Bhattacharya, Poornima
4	"Duniya Nazare Na Gulon Ka"	Alka Yagnik, Kumar Sanu
5	"Dil Mera Deewana Dhadke"	Kumar Sanu, Poornima
6	"Romance Road Per"	Bali Brahmabhat
