= Assembly Rowdy =

1991 Indian film by B. Gopal

- Poster
- Directed by: B. Gopal
- Story by: P. Vasu
- Based on: Velai Kidaichuduchu (1990) by P. Vasu
- Produced by: Mohan Babu
- Starring: Mohan Babu; Divya Bharti
- Cinematography: K. S. Prakash
- Edited by: Gautham Raju
- Music by: K. V. Mahadevan
- Production company: Sree Lakshmi Prasanna Pictures
- Release date: 3 June 1991
- Country: India
- Language: Telugu

Assembly Rowdy is a 1991 Indian Telugu-language action drama film directed by B. Gopal and produced by Mohan Babu. Starring Mohan Babu and Divya Bharati, the film follows Sivaji, an unemployed slacker who transforms into a people's representative after confronting corruption in the political system. It was released on 22 March 1991.

It is a remake of the Tamil film Velai Kidaichuduchu (1990). Assembly Rowdy was a commercial blockbuster upon its release.

== Plot ==
Sivaji is an unemployed slacker who repeatedly fails to secure a job, much to the frustration of his father, Jaggayya, a newly transferred science teacher in their village. One day, Sivaji witnesses a murder and takes legal action, but after his mother, Annapoorna, is injured by local goons, he is framed for another crime. Despite his parents pleading with the villagers to testify in his favour, they are coerced into lying by the village don, leading to Sivaji's imprisonment.

With his parents' support, Sivaji enters politics and successfully becomes an MLA, challenging his opponent Mohan Raj, who is later revealed to be the don's superior. Sivaji arrests the don after he attacks his family and dismantles his criminal operations. Enraged, Mohan Raj retaliates by murdering Sivaji's parents. Devastated, Sivaji resigns from his position but remains determined to seek justice. He ultimately kills both Mohan Raj and the don in a final confrontation. Though wounded in the battle, he survives and vows to continue protecting the village as its MLA.

== Cast ==
- Mohan Babu as Sivaji
- Divya Bharati as Jyothi/Pooja (Voice Dubbed by Roja Ramani)
- Jaggayya as Narayana, Sivaji's father
- Gollapudi Maruti Rao as Pooja's father
- Annapoorna as Sivaji's mother
- Brahmanandam as Veerabrahmam, Sivaji's maternal uncle
- Kaikala Satyanarayana
- Prasad Babu as Collector
- Mohan Raj
- Mada Venkateswara Rao as D.E.O
- Vasugi as Paakija
- Ahuti Prasad as Police Inspector
- Raju Sundaram (special appearance in "Turpu Kondallo")

== Music ==
Assembly Rowdy

Soundtrack album
- Released: 1991
- Length: 22:21

All music is composed by K. V. Mahadevan

Track list
No.	Title	Lyrics	Singer(s)	Length
1.	"Andamaina Vennelalona"	Rasa Raju	K. J. Yesudas, K. S. Chithra	4:56
2.	"Panthulo Panthulu"	Jaladi	S. P. Balasubrahmanyam, K. S. Chithra	4:52
3.	"Thurupu Kondallo Aggi"	Jaladi	S. P. Balasubrahmanyam, K. S. Chithra	3:51
4.	"Tanala Gadilona"	Gurucharan	S. P. Balasubrahmanyam, K. S. Chithra	4:11
5.	"Pekallo Jokerla"	Sirivennela Seetharama Sastry	S. P. Balasubrahmanyam, K. S. Chithra	4:32
Total length:				22:23

== Legacy ==
In 2016, Mohan Babu opened a hotel where the dishes served were named after his films, including "Assembly Rowdy Idly".
