= Chittemma Mogudu =

- Theatrical Release Poster
- Directed by: A. Kodandarami Reddy
- Screenplay by: Paruchuri brothers
- Based on: Thalattu Ketkuthamma by Raj Kapoor
- Produced by: P. Sridhar Reddy
- Starring: Mohan Babu; Divya Bharati; Pooja Bedi; Jaggayya
- Cinematography: M. V. Raghu
- Edited by: Gautham Raju
- Music by: K. V. Mahadevan
- Production company: Sri Sai Shanti Films
- Release date: 3 June 1992
- Running time: 140 minutes
- Country: India
- Language: Telugu

Chittemma Mogudu (transl. Chittemma's husband) is a 1992 Indian Telugu-language film directed by A. Kodandarami Reddy. It stars Mohan Babu, Divya Bharati, Pooja Bedi (her Telugu debut) and Jaggayya. The film was a remake of the 1991 Tamil film Thalattu Ketkuthamma. It was commercially unsuccessful.

== Plot ==
The young village girl Chitti (Divya Bharti) is bubbly and fun-loving. She is enjoying life with her young group of friends, consisting of three younger boys. One day, while playing one of her pranks, an old man curses her. On top of that, she witnesses a pregnant woman falling at night and suffering immense pain before ultimately dying. This incident causes Chitti's fear of pregnancy. A young man, Sai Krishna (Mohan Babu), visits the village and befriends Chitti. Soon after that, her parents arrange Chitti's marriage with Sai Krishna. Both are more than happy with this arrangement. After the wedding, however, Chitti does not want to consummate the marriage for fear of getting pregnant. Sai Krishna is unhappy about it and soon gets attracted to a young doctor (Pooja Bedi). Dreaming of spending nights with her, Sai Krishna gets drunk and goes home where he rapes Chitti. The next morning, upon getting sober, Sai Krishna tries to comfort the outraged Chitti, while the latter tries to leave for her village to go back to her parents. Sai Krishna tries to win her back, but fails time after time. Chitti soon learns that she got pregnant that night while her doctor turns out to be the woman her husband is crazy for.

== Cast ==
- Mohan Babu as Sai Krishna
- Divya Bharati as Chittemma aka Chitti
- Pooja Bedi as Dr. Pushpalatha
- Jaggayya as Chitti's father
- Brahmanandam as Puliraju
- Kota Srinivasa Rao as Military Babai
- Suthi Velu
- Sakshi Ranga Rao
- Mohan Raj
- Annapurna
- Y. Vijaya

== Music ==
Music for this film was composed by K.V Mahadevan.

1. "Halo Halo Lady Doctor" - Mano, K. S. Chithra
2. "Chittemmo Pottemmo"- S. P. Balasubrahmanyam, K.S Chithra
3. "Chinuku Ralithe" - K.J Yesudas, K.S Chithra
4. "Boddulo Rupayibilla"- Mano, K.S Chithra
5. "Namala Swamiki" - S.P Balu, K.S Chithra
6. "Nindu Kundala" - K.J Yesudas

== Awards ==
- Divya Bharti won Nandi Special Jury Award for her performance in this film.
