= Thalattu Ketkuthamma =

- Theatrical release poster
- Directed by: Raj Kapoor
- Written by: Raj Kapoor
- Produced by: Vijayalakshmi Srinivasan; Kanchana Sivaraman
- Starring: Prabhu; Kanaka
- Cinematography: B. R. Vijayalakshmi
- Edited by: B. Lenin; V. T. Vijayan
- Music by: Ilaiyaraaja
- Production company: Sivaji Productions
- Release date: 5 November 1991
- Running time: 150 minutes
- Country: India
- Language: Tamil

Thalattu Ketkuthamma (transl. Can you hear the lullaby?) is a 1991 Indian Tamil-language film directed by Raj Kapoor in his directorial debut. The film stars Prabhu and Kanaka. It was released on 5 November 1991. The film was remade in Telugu as Chittemma Mogudu (1992).

== Plot ==
Raasaiyya, a young man, wants to get married as soon as possible and he compels his uncle. His cousin Pechiamma is an immature tomboy. After seeing her friend Valli dying while delivering a child, Pechiamma thinks that she too will die after the marriage. Raasaiyya finally gets married with Pechiamma. Thereafter, Pechiamma avoids Raasaiyya although he treasures her. One day, Raasaiyya comes home drunk and rapes Pechiamma, leading to her becoming pregnant. What transpires later forms the crux of the story.

== Cast ==
- Prabhu as Rasaiya
- Kanaka as Pechiyamma
- Goundamani as Rasaiya's uncle
- Senthil as Pulipandi
- Silk Smitha as Dr. Mary
- Vadivukkarasi as Vadivu
- Mounica as Valli
- Vijaya Chandrika
- R. P. Viswam as Viswam
- Oru Viral Krishna Rao
- Pandu
- Chokkalinga Bhagavathar as Muthukalai
- Boopathiraja
- MRK
- Omakuchi Narasimhan
- Kovai Senthil
- Sakthivel

== Soundtrack ==
The soundtrack was composed by Ilaiyaraaja, with lyrics written by Vaali.

Song	Singer(s)	Duration
"Annanukku"	Malaysia Vasudevan	4:49
"Nenthukitta"	S. P. Balasubrahmanyam	4:51
"Sonna Petcha"	P. Susheela, Minmini, Yuvan Shankar Raja, Kalpana	4:35
"Sutti Sutti"	S. P. Balasubrahmanyam, K. S. Chithra	4:50
"Yamma Yamma"	S. P. Balasubrahmanyam, K. S. Chithra	5:00
"Amma Enum Vaarthaithaan"	Ilaiyaraaja	5:05

== Release and reception ==
Thalattu Ketkuthamma was released on 5 November 1991, during Diwali. The Indian Express wrote, "With a storyline that can be written at the backside of bus ticket, it is not surprising that debutant director Raj Kapoor [..] spends most of the time beating around the bush". C. R. K. of Kalki appreciated the story for being simple and well-structured without confusion, along with the cinematography and editing, calling the film a "boost" for Prabhu.

== Legacy ==
The film is noted for the song "Ho Gaya" sung by Goundamani which also gained popularity.
