= Phool Bane Patthar =

- Directed by: Ambrish Sangal
- Screenplay by: S. Tahir
- Story by: Vinod Talwar
- Produced by: Vinod Talwar
- Starring: Avinash Wadhawan; Indrani Banerjee; Mohnish Behl; Mohan Joshi; Kader Khan; Kiran Kumar
- Cinematography: Ravikant Reddy
- Edited by: Tara Singh
- Music by: Shyam-Surender
- Production company: Talwar Combines
- Release date: 25 October 1996
- Country: India
- Language: Hindi

Phool Bane Patthar (transl. Flower turned into rock) is a 1996 Indian Hindi-language action film directed by Ambrish Sangal, starring Avinash Wadhawan, Indrani Banerjee, Mohnish Behl, Mohan Joshi, Kader Khan, Kiran Kumar.

== Plot ==
Jaspal Choudhary, an Assistant Commissioner of Police transfers to a police station where gangster Choudhry Bhavani Singh controls the area. Corrupt police officers are involve with Bhawani. Jaspal is killed by the goons of Bhawani Singh. His only daughter, Vineeta swears to avenge the death of her father.

== Cast ==
- Avinash Wadhawan as Raj
- Indrani Banerjee as Vineeta Chaudhary
- Mohnish Behl as Baliya Singh
- Mohan Joshi as Garibdas Singh
- Kader Khan as Bhavani Singh
- Kiran Kumar as ACP Jaspal Chaudhary
- Avtar Gill as Tejpal Singh
- Ajit Vachani as D.I.G. Khanna
- Tiku Talsania as Police Constable Munnu
- Rakesh Bedi as Police Constable Chunnu
- Suresh Chatwal as Customs Officer Gupta
- Jack Gaud as Tiger
- Shiva Rindani as Shiva
- Vinod Talwar

== Soundtrack ==
1. "Chhuo Na Tum Mujhko Aise" – Alisha Chinoy, Bali Brahmbhatt
2. "Main Hoon Haseena" – Kavita Paudwal
3. "Main Jab Sochta Hoon" – Udit Narayan, Anuradha Paudwal
4. "Mujhe Teri Adaaon Ne" – Udit Narayan, Anuradha Paudwal
5. "Meri Jaan Tu Tu Tu" – Abhijeet, Anuradha Paudwal
