= Nila Pennae =

- Theatrical release poster
- Directed by: V. Thamilazhagan
- Written by: R. P. Viswam (dialogues)
- Screenplay by: V. Thamilazhagan
- Produced by: R. M. Veerappan
- Starring: Anand; Divya Bharti
- Cinematography: A. V. Thomas
- Edited by: K. R. Krishnan
- Music by: Vidyasagar
- Production company: Sathya Movies
- Release date: 5 July 1990
- Country: India
- Language: Tamil

Nila Pennae (pronounced [n̪ilaː penneː] transl. Moon girl) is a 1990 Indian Tamil-language film written and directed by V. Thamilazhagan and produced by R. M. Veerappan. The film stars Divya Bharti and Anand with Vennira Aadai Moorthy and Janagaraj in supporting roles. It was released on 5 July 1990.

== Plot ==
Krishnamoorthy lives in the city and decides to stay in a village within a forest for some time. As he is very stressed due to the city life, he meets an old guru woman who creates a girl for him. Krishnamoorthy falls in love immediately and so does the girl whom he calls Suriya. She goes on to show him the beauty of life.

== Cast ==
- Anand as Krishnamoorthy
- Divya Bharti as Suriya
- Soorya
- Vennira Aadai Moorthy
- Janagaraj

== Production ==
The film was directed by V. Thamilazhagan, son of R. M. Veerappan. Vikram mentioned he was supposed to be introduced as lead actor with this film but due to his commitment to En Kadhal Kanmani he was not able to take up this film. As the director was scouting for the film's lead actress, he instructed art designer Bharani to draw the portrait of a girl with the features he had imagined as he wanted the actress to look that way. The portrait was printed in a magazine and around twenty girls auditioned but none of them satisfied Thamilazhagan. When he came to know about Divya Bharathi in Mumbai who had that look, he chose her but since she was too young the crew waited for a year for her to grow and then the filming began. This was Anand's first film as solo lead actor after previously appearing in second lead roles.

== Soundtrack ==
The music was composed by Vidyasagar.

Song	Singers	Lyrics	Length
"Adi Raasathi"	S. P. Balasubrahmanyam	Vaali	0:44
"Kichang Kichang"	K. S. Chithra, Gangai Amaran	Pulamaipithan	05:14
"Manasukku Vayasenna"	K. S. Chithra	Vaali	04:53
"Otha Kuyilu"	Swarnalatha, S. P. Balasubrahmanyam	Gangai Amaran	04:39
"Pudhu Uravu"	K. J. Yesudas, P. Susheela	Vairamuthu	04:47
"Raathiri Mella" 1	S. P. Balasubrahmanyam, K. S. Chithra	Vaali	05:14
"Raathiri Mella" 2	Malaysia Vasudevan, K. S. Chithra	Vaali	05:14
"Thalaiyil Kiridangal"	S. P. Balasubrahmanyam	Vairamuthu	04:33

== Release and reception ==
Nila Pennae was released on 5 July 1990, delayed from June. NKS of The Indian Express appreciated Divya Bharti and the music, but criticised the acting of the others. P. S. S. of Kalki wondered who would be guilty of derailing a wonderful film that started out as a highly award-winning feature for box-office collection purposes or anything else, but praised the cinematography.
