= Divya Bharti =

Indian actress (1974–1993)

- Bharti in 1992
- Born: 25 February 1974; Mumbai, Maharashtra, India
- Died: 5 April 1993 (aged 19); Mumbai, Maharashtra, India
- Occupation: Actress
- Years active: 1990–1993
- Spouse: Sajid Nadiadwala (m. 1992)

Divya Bharti (Note: There are numerous variant spellings of the name. These include Divya Bharati and Divya Bharathi.) (Hindi pronunciation: [dɪʋjaː bʱaːrtiː]; 25 February 1974 – 5 April 1993) was an Indian actress who predominantly worked in Hindi and Telugu cinema. Known for her acting, vivacity and beauty, she was among the highest-paid Indian actresses of her time. She received a Filmfare Award and a Nandi Award for her performances.

Bharti began her career as a teenager, working as a pin-up model. She made her acting debut with the Telugu film Bobbili Raja (1990), which was a blockbuster at the box office. She subsequently starred in successful Telugu films such as Assembly Rowdy (1991) and Rowdy Alludu (1991), establishing herself as a leading actress in the industry. She received the Nandi Special Jury Award for her performance in Chittemma Mogudu (1992), before transitioning to Hindi cinema with the action thriller Vishwatma (1992) and the action comedy Shola Aur Shabnam (1992). She solidified her position with the romantic drama Deewana (1992), which won her the Filmfare Award for Best Female Debut.

On 5 April 1993, Bharti died at the age of 19 after falling from the balcony of her fifth-floor apartment in Bombay. The circumstances of her death led to various conspiracy theories, but it was officially ruled as an accidental fall.

== Early life ==
Bharti was born on 25 February 1974 in Mumbai to Om Prakash Bharti and Meeta Bharti. She had a younger brother named Kunal and a half-sister, Poonam, from her father's previous marriage. Actress Kainaat Arora is her second cousin. She spoke Hindi, English and Marathi fluently. In her early years, she was known for her bubbly personality and doll-like looks. She studied at Maneckji Cooper High School in Juhu, Mumbai. Bharti was a restless student at school and completed the 9th standard (Note: Ninth grade, freshman year, or grade 9 is the ninth post-kindergarten year of school education in India) before pursuing an acting career.

== Film career ==
=== Early roles and Telugu films ===
In 1988, while still in the ninth grade, Bharti was signed by filmmaker Nandu Tolani for a film project. She was initially slated to make her debut in Gunahon Ka Devta (1990), but her role was later cancelled and she was replaced by Sangeeta Bijlani. Around the same time, Kirti Kumar, brother of actor Govinda, noticed her at a video rental store and expressed interest in casting her opposite Govinda in Radha Ka Sangam (1992). Kumar negotiated with director Dilip Shankar to release her from her earlier contract. Despite undergoing months of training in dance and acting, Bharti was eventually replaced by Juhi Chawla in Radha Ka Sangam. Media reports speculated that the decision stemmed from concerns over her youthful demeanor and Kumar's alleged possessiveness. Bharti's career was stalled until D. Ramanaidu, a Telugu film producer, offered her a leading role in the film Bobbili Raja opposite his son Daggubati Venkatesh. Filmed in Andhra Pradesh, the movie marked her official screen debut and achieved significant commercial success. Bobbili Raja was released in the summer of 1990 and considered one of the notable Telugu films of the early 1990s. Later, Bharti acted in another Tamil film Nila Pennae alongside Anand. The film did not perform well critically or commercially. In 1991, Bharti had back-to-back hits with action comedy film Rowdy Alludu and drama Assembly Rowdy opposite actors Chiranjeevi and Mohan Babu, respectively. Later that year, Bharti began filming A. Kodandarami Reddy's action-romance Dharma Kshetram under the banner of Sri Rajeev Productions. The project marked her first collaboration with Telugu actor Nandamuri Balakrishna.

=== Transition to Hindi films and stardom ===
Following her success in Telugu films, Bharti attracted the attention of leading Hindi cinema directors. In 1992, Bharti made her Hindi film debut with Rajiv Rai’s ensemble action-dramaVishwatma, alongside Sunny Deol, Naseeruddin Shah, Chunky Pandey, and Sonam. She was cast as Kusum Verma—love interest of Sunny Deol. Released on 24 January 1992, the film was both a commercial and critical success, ranking as the sixth highest-grossing Indian film of the year. The popularity of the song 'Saat Samundar' from the soundtrack received notable attention and became associated with Bharti's early success. In an interview with Filmfare, Bharti said that she liked her role as Kusum, in the film, describing it as a "very good role". The film was an average box office performer but gained Bharti wider recognition from the public as well as film critics. Bharti was most notable for the song used in the film Saat Samundar. A week later, Bharti's worked in Lawrence D'Souza's romantic drama Dil Ka Kya Kasoor opposite Prithvi. The film failed to do well at the box office but was recognised for its music. In March 1992, her next release was David Dhawan's romantic action drama Shola Aur Shabnam. It received positive reviews and was a box office hit, marking Bharti's first major hit in Hindi films. She achieved further success in Raj Kanwar's Deewana, which starred veteran actor Rishi Kapoor and newcomer Shahrukh Khan. It was one of the biggest hits of 1992. Her performance in Deewana was highly appreciated. Critics reported that Bharti belonged to a new breed of Hindi film actors who broke away from character stereotypes. Bharti won the Filmfare Award for Lux New Face of the Year. By July 1992, Bharti's work in Deewana was said to have earned her more recognition.

In 1992, Bharti appeared in several Hindi-language films. These included the action drama Jaan Se Pyaara opposite Govinda; romantic drama Geet opposite Avinash Wadhawan; action Dushman Zamana alongside Armaan Kohli, and action drama Balwaan that marked the debut of Suniel Shetty. Balwaan achieved moderate commercial success. In October of the same year, Bharti featured in Dil Aashna Hai, a romantic drama directed by Hema Malini. Although the film did not perform well at the box office, Bharti's portrayal of a bar dancer searching for her birth mother received critical appreciation. Bharti expressed a commitment to continue working in Telugu cinema, aiming to appear in at least one Telugu film annually to maintain her connection with the Telugu audience. Chittemma Mogudu co-starring Mohan Babu, was released in early 1993. Her final film released during her lifetime was Kshatriya, an ensemble cast drama featuring Sunny Deol, Sanjay Dutt, and Raveena Tandon, which released on 26 March 1993. Following her death, two Hindi films—Rang and Shatranj—were released posthumously on 7 July and 17 December 1993, respectively. Both films saw moderate success. Although Bharti had completed filming her scenes, a dubbing artist was used for her voice as she had not recorded her own dialogue. Her incomplete Telugu film Tholi Muddhu was partly completed by Rambha, who slightly resembled Bharti and hence was used as her body double to complete her remaining scenes. The film was released in October 1993.

Following Bharti's death in April 1993, several film projects in which she had been cast were completed with other actors. She was replaced in Mohra by Raveena Tandon, in Kartavya by Juhi Chawla, in Vijaypath by Tabu, in Dilwale again by Tandon, in Andolan by Mamta Kulkarni, in Hulchal by Kajol, and in Angrakshak by Pooja Bhatt. Bharti had completed a significant portion of filming for Laadla, but the role was subsequently reshot with Sridevi. According to reports, Bharti was initially considered for the role of Simran in Dilwale Dulhania Le Jayenge and was reportedly director Aditya Chopra's first choice for the part. She was also signed to portray Kiran Awasthi in Darr, but was later replaced by Juhi Chawla, reportedly at the request of actor Aamir Khan.

Bharti had also signed on for several film projects that were ultimately shelved following her death. These included Do Kadam with Salman Khan, Kanyadaan with Rishi Kapoor, Parinaam with Akshay Kumar, Bajrang with Sunny Deol, and Chal Pe Chal with Jackie Shroff. Production on these films did not proceed, and they remained unreleased.

== Personal life ==
Bharti met director-producer Sajid Nadiadwala through actor Govinda while working on the set of Shola Aur Shabnam (1992), and married Nadiadwala on 10 May 1992 in the presence of her hairdresser and friend Sandhya, and Sandhya's husband. She then embraced Islam and changed her name to Sana Nadiadwala. The marriage was kept secret so as to not affect her film career.

== Death ==
In the late evening hours of 5 April 1993, Bharti fell from the balcony window of her fifth-floor apartment in Tulsi Buildings, Versova, Andheri West in Bombay. When her guests Neeta Lulla, Neeta's husband Shyam Lulla, Bharti's maid Amrita Kumari, and neighbours realised what had happened, she was rushed in an ambulance to the emergency department at Cooper Hospital, where she died, at the age of 19. Her death was subject to conspiracy theories but her father denied any wrongdoing. The official causes of her death were deemed to be head injuries and internal bleeding. She was cremated on 7 April 1993 at the Vile Parle crematorium in Bombay.

== Reactions and legacy ==
Bharti acted in 21 films during her short career and was one of the highest-paid actresses at the time of her death. She had made a mark in the industry at the very young age with her remarkable acting skills. Her offscreen persona and unique acting ability have been highly appreciated and reminisced by many of her co-stars and critics. Bharti appeared in the "Top Actress" list of Box Office India in 1992. In 2022, she was placed in Outlook India's "75 Best Bollywood Actresses" list.

Her sudden death left the industry stunned. Talking about her and her acting, Shah Rukh Khan, who shared screen space with her in Deewana and Dil Aashna Hai described her "stunning as an actor". Suniel Shetty stated, "I have not yet seen any other actress who is as talented as Divya Bharti. I don't think anyone had as much talent as she possessed. Her talent was unbelievable, she'd do masti and bachpana (fun and childish behavior) before the shoot commenced and when asked for, she'd give such a perfect shot that I used to forget my own dialogues!". Actress Karishma Kapoor has paid her tribute by saying, "She was so wonderful in Deewana.. couldn't take my eyes off! We really miss her a lot." Chunky Panday has pronounced her to be Chulbuli (bubbly) and said that she was full of life, energy and loved to work with her in Vishwatma.

Actor Govinda called Bharti "different than other actresses of her time". He also said, "Juhi, Kajol, and Karishma are in a different spot, Divya had a totally different kind of appeal from those three. What she had was natural and God-given, it cannot be created by anyone, however much they may try. She had a raw, tamed, wild look about her which magnetised the audience." Producer Guddu Dhanoa, upon working with her in Deewana, has stated that Bollywood misses her a lot and the void which was created owing to her death could not be filled by anyone else. Archana Puran Singh in the caption of one of her social media posts has written, "Divya was a sweet soul, still remember sobbing the day she passed away". In a heartfelt reflection, Actress Ayesha Jhulka opened up about her deep bond with Bharti, calling her a "powerhouse and brilliant actress" whose absence left an "irreplaceable void in the industry". Recalling their time together during the filming of Rang. Jhulka also shared touching memories of Bharti; buying matching shoes, affectionate gestures like bringing her a bindi on set. Further, she stated that the most haunting experience during screening of Rang after Bharti's death, when the screen suddenly collapsed as Bharti appeared on it, a moment that made her feel Bharti's presence so strongly that she couldn't sleep for days. Expressing the depth of their friendship and her admiration and added with conviction that "no other actress would have got a chance". In an interview, actress Sonam Khan opened up about her deep friendship with Bharti, reflecting on their time together during the filming of Vishwatma, where their bond first blossomed. Sonam fondly recalled one of their final conversations just days before Bharti's untimely death in April 1993. At the time, Sonam was eight months pregnant, and Bharti had gently told her to "look at the moon", lovingly predicting she would have a beautiful baby—an exchange that revealed the tenderness and intimacy of their relationship. Still affected by the tragic loss. Sonam also expressed her sorrow, saying that she was a "very nice girl". Had she been alive today, she would have been at the top. It's heartbreaking, the accident that happened to her; it shouldn't have happened. Sonam's recollections offered a heartfelt glimpse into the personal and professional promise Divya Bharti held—a life and career tragically cut short.

New-generation artists like Varun Dhawan and Anushka Sharma have also remembered Divya Bharti in some of their interviews. Dhawan has revealed that Bharti was "one of the actresses from the 90s, he would have loved to work with." Anushka Sharma said, "I became a huge fan of Divya Bharti after watching her songs. I would dance to almost all her songs, especially 'Saat Samundar'. When she passed away, my mother didn't tell me for about a week because she knew I would break down."

In 2011, veteran actor Dev Anand made the movie Chargesheet, which was loosely based on her death and the mystery surrounding it.

== Filmography ==
List of the films acted by Divya Bharti
Year	Title (Note: Films are listed in order of release date.)	Role(s)	Language	Notes	Ref(s).
1990	Nila Pennae	Suriya (Note: Bharti plays an unnamed girl in the film, who is later named Suriya.)	Tamil		
1990	Bobbili Raja	Rani	Telugu		
1991	Assembly Rowdy	Pooja / Jyothi	Telugu		
1991	Rowdy Alludu	Rekha	Telugu		
1991	Naa Ille Naa Swargam	Lalitha	Telugu		
1991	Ek aur Faulad	Priya	Hindi	Unreleased	
1992	Dharma Kshetram	Mythili	Telugu		
1992	Chittemma Mogudu	Chittemma (Chitti)	Telugu		
1992	Vishwatma	Kusum Verma	Hindi		
1992	Dil Ka Kya Kasoor	Shalini/Seema	Hindi		
1992	Shola Aur Shabnam	Divya Thapa	Hindi		
1992	Jaan Se Pyaara	Sharmila	Hindi		
1992	Deewana	Kajal / Sonu	Hindi	Filmfare Award for Best Female Debut	
1992	Balwaan	Deepa Sahni	Hindi		
1992	Dil Hi To Hai	Bharati	Hindi		
1992	Dushman Zamana	Seema Narang	Hindi		
1992	Geet	Neha	Hindi		
1992	Dil Aashna Hai	Laila/ Sitara	Hindi		
1993	Kshatriya	Tanvi Singh	Hindi	Last release before death	
1993	Rang	Kajal Malhotra	Hindi	Posthumous	
1993	Shatranj	Renu	Hindi	Posthumous	
1993	Tholi Muddhu	Divya	Telugu	Posthumous/role completed by Rambha	

=== Unfinished films ===
List of 12 films Divya Bharti had signed/was acting at the time of her death
Year	Film (Note: Films are listed in order of supposed release year.)	Role(s)	Language(s)	Notes	Ref(s).
1993	Chinthamani	Chinthamani	Telugu	Shelved	
1993	Dhanwan	Anjali Chopra	Hindi	Replaced by Karisma Kapoor	
1994	Laadla	Sheetal Jetley	Hindi	Replaced by Sridevi	
1994	Mohra	Roma Singh	Hindi	Replaced by Raveena Tandon	
1994	Dilwale	Swapna	Hindi	Replaced by Raveena Tandon	
1994	Vijaypath	Mohini / Vrushali	Hindi	Replaced by Tabu	
1995	Andolan	Guddi	Hindi	Replaced by Mamta Kulkarni	
1995	Kartavya	Kajal	Hindi	Replaced by Juhi Chawla	
1995	Kanyadaan	—	Hindi	Replaced by Manisha Koirala	
1995	Hulchul	Sharmili	Hindi	Replaced by Kajol	
1995	Angrakshak	Priyanka	Hindi	Replaced by Pooja Bhatt	
	Do Kadam	—	Hindi	Shelved	

== Awards ==
Year	Association	Category	Work	Result	Ref(s)
1991	Filmfare Awards South	Best Actress – Telugu	Bobbili Raja	Nominated	
1993	Nandi Awards	Special Jury Award	Chittemma Mogudu	Won	
1993	Filmfare Awards South	Best Actress – Telugu	Chittemma Mogudu	Nominated	
1993	Filmfare Awards	Lux New Face of the Year	Deewana	Won	

== See also ==
- Brij Sadanah
- Gulshan Kumar
- Guru Dutt
- Raj Kiran (actor)
- List of people who disappeared mysteriously: post-1970
