= Dharma Kshetram =

1992 film by A. Kodandarami Reddy

- Theatrical release poster
- Directed by: A. Kodandarami Reddy
- Screenplay by: A. Kodandarami Reddy
- Story by: Paruchuri brothers
- Produced by: K. C. Reddy
- Starring: Balakrishna; Divya Bharti
- Cinematography: A. Vincent; A. Venkat
- Edited by: D. Venkataratnam
- Music by: Ilaiyaraaja
- Production company: Sri Rajeev Productions
- Release date: 14 February 1992
- Running time: 147 minutes
- Country: India
- Language: Telugu

Dharma Kshetram (transl. Field of Righteousness) is a 1992 Indian Telugu-language legal action film, produced by K. C. Reddy under the Sri Rajeev Productions banner and directed by A. Kodandarami Reddy. It stars Nandamuri Balakrishna and Divya Bharti, with music composed by Ilaiyaraaja. The film was released on 14 February 1992, and was commercially successful.

== Cast ==
- Nandamuri Balakrishna as Advocate Banerjee
- Divya Bharati as Maithili
- Jaggayya as Judge
- Nassar as S.P.
- Rami Reddy as Durga Prasad
- Devan as Pandu
- Srihari as Sobhanadri
- Brahmaji as Sambhu Prasad
- Sakshi Ranga Rao as Madhava Rao
- Prasanna Kumar as Prabhakar
- Posani Krishna Murali as Citizen
- Jayalalita as Lawyer Kamakshi
- Jyothi as Banerjee's Sister
- Sudha Rani as Bharathi
- Radhabai as Banerjee's grandmother

== Soundtrack ==
Music composed by Ilaiyaraaja. The song "Enno Ratrulosthayi" was taken from Ilaiyaraja's own song, "Maasimaasam" from the Tamil film Dharma Durai (1991). The song was remixed by Ghibran for Amigos (2023).

Track listing
No.	Title	Lyrics	Singer(s)	Length
1.	"Enno Ratrulosthayi Gani"	Veturi	S. P. Balasubrahmanyam, K. S. Chithra	5:01
2.	"Cheli Nadume Andam"	Veturi	S. P. Balasubrahmanyam, K. S. Chithra	5:07
3.	"Mudduto Srungara Beetu"	Veturi	S. P. Balasubrahmanyam, S. Janaki	4:41
4.	"Are Inka Janka"	Sirivennela Seetharama Sastry	S. P. Balasubrahmanyam, S. Janaki	5:42
5.	"Pelliki Munde Okka Sari"	Sirivennela Seetharama Sastry	S. P. Balasubrahmanyam, S. Janaki	4:59
6.	"Kora Meenu Komalam"	Veturi	Mano, K. S. Chithra	5:05
Total length:				30:25
