= Tholi Muddu =

1993 Telugu language film

- Theatrical release poster
- Directed by: K. Rushendra Reddy
- Written by: Ganesh Patro (Dialogue)
- Screenplay by: K. Rushendra Reddy
- Story by: Rajiv Kaul; Praful Parekh
- Produced by: G. C. Gupta Presents; G. Radhadevi Gupta; K. K. Reddy
- Starring: Prashanth; Divya Bharati
- Cinematography: K. Shankar
- Edited by: Kotagiri Venkateswara Rao
- Music by: Ilaiyaraaja
- Production company: Durga Films
- Release date: 16 October 1993
- Running time: 140 minutes
- Country: India
- Language: Telugu

Tholi Muddu (transl. The First Kiss) is a 1993 Indian Telugu-language teen romance film directed and co-written by K. Rushendra Reddy and starring Prashanth and Divya Bharati. The film is a remake of the 1990 Hindi-language film Dil. The soundtrack was composed by Ilaiyaraaja. The film was dubbed into Tamil as Ilam Nenje Vaa.

This was the last Telugu film of actress Divya Bharti, which was posthumously released six months after her death. Due to Divya's death before filming was completed, her remaining scenes were completed by actress Rambha, who slightly resembled Divya (Only Divya was credited in the final film). The film was commercially successful.

== Plot ==
Prashanth and Divya get married without informing anyone. Soon enough, Divya's father tries to make their life a living hell.

== Cast ==
- Prashanth as Prashanth
- Divya Bharti as Divya
  - Rambha as Divya (Replacement for Divya)
- Brahmanandam as Police Inspector
- Kota Srinivasa Rao as Kotishwara Raayudu
- Captain Raju as Mr. Gupta
- Senthil as Swamiji
- Raaki
- Ali as Prashanth's friend
- Ironleg Sastri
- Annapoorna
- Pandari Bai

== Production ==
Due to Divya Bharti's death on 5 April 1993, the rest of Divya's scenes were completed by actress Rambha while Roja Ramani dubbed her voice.

== Soundtrack ==
=== Telugu version ===
The original score by Ilaiyaraaja consists of 6 tracks. The song "Vaane Laddi" was not included in the movie.

Title	Singers
"Idhi Bombai Bulliro"	S.P. Balu
"Toli Muddu"	S.P. Balu, Janaki
"Mem Premikulam"	S.P. Balu, Janaki
"Chittiguma Padave"	S.P. Balu, Janaki
"Ravaa Priyathama"	S.P. Balu, Janaki
"Vane Laddi"	S.P. Balu, Janaki

=== Tamil version ===
Music composed by Ilaiyaraaja consists of 6 tracks and were released in 1995.

Title	Singers
"Idhi Bombaye"	S.P Balu, Chorus
"Oru Mutham"	S.P Balu, Chithra
"Ini Vellvathu"	S.P Balu, Chithra, Chorus
"Chittu Kuruvi"	S.P Balu, Chithra
"Vezhva Maranama"	S.P Balu, Chithra
"Mattai Kozhi"	S.P Balu, Chithra
