= Dhanwan (1993 film) =

1993 Indian film by K. Vishwanath

Dhanwaan
- Release poster
- Directed by: K. Vishwanath
- Written by: K. Vishwanath; Javed Siddiqui; Robin Bhatt; Sujit Sen
- Produced by: Sudhakar Bokade
- Starring: Ajay Devgan; Manisha Koirala; Karishma Kapoor; Avinash Wadhawan
- Cinematography: Shyam Rao
- Edited by: Prasanth-Vinod
- Music by: Anand–Milind
- Distributed by: Divya Films International
- Release date: 10 December 1993
- Country: India
- Language: Hindi
- Budget: ₹1.60 crore
- Box office: ₹2.61 crore

Dhanwaan (transl. Wealthy) is a 1993 Indian Hindi-language romance film directed by K. Vishwanath. The film stars Ajay Devgan, Manisha Koirala, Karishma Kapoor, and Avinash Wadhawan. The role of Anjali was originally offered to Divya Bharti but after her death on April 5, she was replaced by Kapoor.

== Plot ==
Kashinath and Imli are childhood sweethearts and everyone expects them to marry. Then comes rich, wealthy, and sickly Anjali Chopra into Kashinath's life, and then everything changes. Anjali gives up on her sickliness and becomes bold, thanks to Kashinath's care. Anjali falls in love with Kashinath, and boldly tells her dad, Manmohan Chopra, that she will only marry Kashinath. But he wants her to wed Ajit. Imli reveals her secret that she has heart disease, and if not treated, she will die. Kashinath, unaware of Anjali's affections must find the money to save his true love. What sacrifices will he have to make in order to achieve this?

== Cast ==
- Ajay Devgan as Kashinath
- Manisha Koirala as Imli
- Karishma Kapoor as Anjali Chopra
- Avinash Wadhawan as Ajit
- Tinu Anand as Ajit's Uncle
- Dalip Tahil as Manmohan Chopra
- Aruna Irani as Neeta Kashinath's Mother
- Shakti Kapoor as Banarasi
- Kader Khan as Jagmohan Chopra
- Himani Shivpuri as Razia Hameed's Daughter
- Shail Chaturvedi as Hameed

== Soundtrack ==
The soundtrack was tuned by Anand–Milind and the lyrics were penned by Sameer Anjaan.

Song	Singer
"Rafta Rafta Chal"	S. P. Balasubrahmanyam
"Bolo Bolo Main Hoon Kaun"	S. P. Balasubrahmanyam, Kavita Krishnamurthy
"O Sahiba O Sahiba, O Sahiba O Sahiba"	S. P. Balasubrahmanyam, Kavita Krishnamurthy, Sadhana Sargam
"Ek Hi Ghosla Do Dilon Ka, Ek Hi Silsila Dhadkanon Ka"	S. P. Balasubrahmanyam, Kavita Krishnamurthy, Sadhana Sargam
"Rang Di Rang Di, Preet Ne Rang Di"	Suresh Wadkar, Nitin Mukesh, Kavita Krishnamurthy
"Ashaon Ki Lagake"	Suresh Wadkar
"Koi Phool Kahin"	Abhijeet, Alka Yagnik
