= Rowdy Alludu =

- Promotional poster
- Directed by: K. Raghavendra Rao
- Written by: Satyanand (story & dialogues)
- Produced by: Allu Aravind; Dr. K. Venkateswara Rao; Panja Prasad
- Starring: Chiranjeevi; Divya Bharti; Shobana; Kota Srinivasa Rao
- Cinematography: K. S. Hari
- Edited by: Vellaiswamy
- Music by: Bappi Lahari
- Production company: Sri Sai Ram Arts
- Distributed by: Geetha Arts
- Release date: 18 October 1991 (India)
- Country: India
- Language: Telugu

Rowdy Alludu (transl. Rowdy son-in-law) is a 1991 Indian Telugu-language action comedy film directed by K. Raghavendra Rao. The film was produced by Allu Aravind, Dr. K. Venkateswara Rao and Panja Prasad under the banner, which is named, Sri Sai Ram Arts. It stars Chiranjeevi in a dual role, with Sobhana and Divya Bharti. The film received positive reviews and was a box office success.

== Plot ==
Kalyan is an industrialist, whose conniving enemy Venkat Rayudu and his partners, replace him with his doppelgänger Johnny, an Mumbai-based auto driver. They manage to frame Kalyan for murder, but Johnny realizes Kalyan's innocence and saves him. The duo manages to prove Kalyan's innocence, and also defeat Venkat Rayudu and his partners.

== Cast ==
- Chiranjeevi as Kalyan and Johnny (dual role)
- Divya Bharti as Rekha (Voice Dubbed by Roja Ramani)
- Shobhana as Sita (Voice Dubbed by Rohini)
- Kota Srinivasa Rao as Venkat Rayudu
- Allu Rama Lingaiah as Papi Kondalu
- Captain Raju as Ranjith Kumar
- Brahmanandam as Mental Doctor/ Photographer
- Kaikala Satyanarayana as Kalyan's father
- J. V. Somayajulu as Madhavaiah
- Ironleg Sastri as Jeetendra
- Disco Shanthi in an item number
- Ananth as Peon in Kalyan's Office
- Radha Kumari as Venkat Rayudu's wife
- Annapurna as Kalyan's mother

== Production ==
Rowdy Alludu was conceived as a mass entertainer with a focus on commercial appeal. Initially, Allu Ramalingaiah raised concerns about using the word "Rowdy" as a prefix in the title, but director K. Raghavendra Rao, lead actor Chiranjeevi, and writer Satyanand convinced him to retain the name.

For the casting, Divya Bharati, a popular actress at the time, was signed for the role of Rekha, while Shobana was cast as Sita. The film was notable for being one of the first Telugu films to be shot in Switzerland. Due to budget constraints, the production team was limited in size, which required the producer, Allu Aravind, to take on additional roles, including serving as a costume and makeup assistant for Chiranjeevi. Shobana, meanwhile, handled her own makeup.

The filming of the song "Chiluka Kshemama" was particularly challenging due to the limited crew. The actors and director improvised choreography based on the natural light and scenic locations during their three-day shoot. Key locations for the song included the Rhine Falls, the Interlaken Casino (where Yash Chopra's statue now stands), and Zurich.

== Soundtrack ==
Rowdy Alludu

Soundtrack album by Bappi Lahari And Saluri Vasu Rao
- Released: 1991
- Length: 36:35
- Label: Lahari Music

All music is composed by Bappi Lahiri.

Telugu Track listing
No.	Title	Lyrics	Singer(s)	Length
1.	"Amalapuram Bullodu"	Bhuvanachandra	S. P. Balasubrahmanyam, Radhika	7:12
2.	"Chiluka Kshemama"	Sirivennela Seetharama Sastry	S. P. Balasubrahmanyam, K. S. Chithra	5:34
3.	"Kori Kori Kalutundhi"	Sirivennela Seetharama Sastry	S. P. Balasubrahmanyam, K. S. Chithra	3:58
4.	"Love Me My Hero"	Bhuvanachandra	S. P. Balasubrahmanyam, K. S. Chithra	5:16
5.	"Prema Geema Tassadiyya"	Bhuvanachandra	S. P. Balasubrahmanyam, K. S. Chithra	5:08
6.	"Slowly Slowly"	Bhuvanachandra	S. P. Balasubrahmanyam, K. S. Chithra	4:39
7.	"Thadinaka Tappadika"	Sirivennela Seetharama Sastry	S. P. Balasubrahmanyam, K. S. Chithra	4:48
Total length:				36:35

Pokkiri Mappilai

Soundtrack album
- Length: 30:42

Tamil Track listing
No.	Title	Singer(s)	Length
1.	"Aasai Vanthu"	Mano, K. S. Chitra	3:57
2.	"Azhage Nilamma"	Mano, K. S. Chitra	6:01
3.	"Bolo Bolo"	Mano, K. S. Chithra	5:30
4.	"Love Me"	Mano, K. S. Chithra	5:14
5.	"Onnukkulla Onnu"	Mano, K. S. Chithra	5:07
6.	"Sanjanakka"	Mano, K. S. Chithra	4:39
Total length:			30:42

== Reception ==
Reviewing its Tamil dubbed version Pokkiri Mappilai, K. Vijiyan of New Straits Times wrote that "director Raghavendra Rao has concentrated his efforts on pure entertainment with disco songs, sexy dances, beautiful actresses, lots of action and filming in the snow capped mountains of Switzerland".

== Box office ==
Rowdy Alludu was a "Blockbuster" at the box office and completed 100 days in almost every theatre it was shown.
