= Geet (1992 film) =

Geet (गीत)
- Vinyl cover
- Directed by: Partho Ghosh
- Produced by: Neelima Paul
- Starring: Avinash Wadhawan; Divya Bharti; Shakti Kapoor
- Cinematography: Yusuf Khan
- Music by: Bappi Lahiri
- Production company: Vishakha Films
- Release date: 20 November 1992
- Running time: 151 minutes
- Country: India
- Language: Hindi

Geet (transl. Song) is a 1992 Indian Hindi-language film directed by Partho Ghosh. The film stars Avinash Wadhawan and Divya Bharti in lead roles. Shakti Kapoor, Laxmikant Berde play supporting roles.

== Plot ==
The movie depicts Rajesh Tripathi (Avinash Wadhawan) living in poverty with his widowed father, Shivshankar. Rajesh left his village to study in Mumbai where he becomes a fan of singer and dancer Neha (Divya Bharti) of whom he paints hoardings.

Neha's manager, Hari Saxena (Shakti Kapoor), harasses her, but she refuses his advances and slaps him. Angered Hari then calls another singer to replace Neha and secretly puts vermilion (sindoor) in laddoos and gives them to Neha. In the middle of the show, Neha's voice becomes rough due to the vermillion. Her doctor deems her unable to continue singing.

Meanwhile, Rajesh is caught by the police and is unable to see Neha's performance. During the holidays, he returns home and is pleasantly surprised to find that Neha has also re-located there.

Later on, Neha's car breaks down and Rajesh offers her a lift, but soon his car also breaks down in the middle of a forest. It begins to rain, so they find shelter in an old house where they are attacked by goons. Rajesh overcomes the goons and Neha details the events to the police, but the police arrest Raju instead. He is later released after one of the goons confesses.

Neha starts a plan and sends Rajesh a love letter asking him to accompany her to an isolated shack. She locks him in the shack, which almost kills him. After this incident, Neha accepts his friendship and confides to him that she can never sing again as her vocal cords have been damaged beyond repair. Rajesh accepts the challenge and sets about to resurrect Neha's voice and her career, not knowing that both of them are targets of Hari, who has planned a bad ending for Neha and anyone who supports her.

== Cast ==
- Avinash Wadhawan as Rajesh Tripathi "Raja"
- Divya Bharti as Neha
- Shakti Kapoor as Hari Saxena
- Laxmikant Berde as Pandey
- Anil Dhawan as Doctor

== Music ==
The music was composed by Bappi Lahiri and features vocals from Lata Mangeshkar, Mohammed Aziz, Kavita Krishnamurthy, Kumar Sanu, Alka Yagnik and Reshma. The songs "Aap Jo Mere Meet Na Hote" and "Prem Patra Aaya Hai Usne Bulaya Hai" were among the most popular.

Song	Singer
"Aap Jo Mere Meet"	Lata Mangeshkar
"Prem Patra Aaya Hai"	Kumar Sanu
"Tujhse Mujhe Pyar Tha"	Kumar Sanu, Alka Yagnik
"Tere Sur Mein Main Gaoon"	Debashish Dasgupta, Alka Yagnik
"Jo Dil Se Nikle Woh"	Alka Yagnik
"Om Namah Shivay"	Alka Yagnik
"Aankhon Mein Basa Le To Main Khwab Ban Jaungi"	Kavita Krishnamurthy, Mohammed Aziz
"O Piya, O Piya"	Reshma
