= Meera Ka Mohan =

- Directed by: K. Ravi Shankar
- Produced by: Gulshan Kumar
- Starring: Avinash Wadhawan; Ashwini Bhave; Pran
- Music by: Arun Paudwal
- Distributed by: T-Series Films
- Release date: 7 February 1992
- Country: India
- Language: Hindi

Meera Ka Mohan is a 1992 Bollywood musical movie produced by Gulshan Kumar and directed by K. Ravi Shankar. It was average at the box office, but the songs were hits and are still remembered. The music was composed by Arun Paudwal, husband of singer Anuradha Paudwal.

Meera Ka Mohan was the debut movie of actor Deepak Saraf, who worked in a few movies in the early 1990s.

== Plot ==
The film highlights the importance of friendship in the lives of Ravi (Avinash Wadhawan), Vijay (Brando Bakshi) and Preeti (Ashwini Bhave). Ravi holds in esteem Preeti's father Prem Shankar (Alok Nath), musical maestro, and himself intervenes in a prestigious musical award function, on his behalf, in which Judge Rai Bahadur Devi Prasad (Pran (actor)) is the chief guest. Impressed by his truth about the genius of Master Prem Shankar, and the crimes of the recommended awardee, Judge Rai Bahadur Devi Prasad bestows the award on Prem Shankar, much to the delight of his daughter Preeti, who is herself a dance teacher.

Time again throws both Ravi and Preeti together, when the musical award function rogues Shakti Raj and Dileep abduct Preeti in a moving bus and try to molest her, but is saved by the timely intervention of Ravi. Both now develop a deep bond of friendship, which is love in Ravi's dreams. Much to his disappointment however, Vijay, son of Judge Rai Bahadur Devi Prasad, returns from London, to woo his bride, who is none other than Preeti. Here is introduced the light-hearted comedy of Ramu (Ashok Saraf) and Bhola (Rakesh Bedi), both pursuing Lajjo (Kunika Lal).

When Vijay takes Preeti to his father to marry her, the Judge in him refuses the alliance, saying that Preeti was not honest in character, as he had seen her on a rainy night with Ravi, under one umbrella. But Vijay flings this apart and goes to the local temple priest A.K. Hangal with Preeti and marries her, in the temple, with only God as their other witness. Rai Bahadur Devi Prasad has to accept this now, but keeps a wish in front of Preeti, that she will never meet Ravi.

Again time betrays Preeti and she is pursued by villains, Shakti Raj and Dileep on a terrorism filled night when there is a curfew in the city, and she has to stay in Ravi's house for the night. One of the villains, Shakti Raj is murdered on the same night, and the blame falls on Ravi as he had challenged them to a fight at the local club, to threaten them into leaving the pursuit of Preeti. During the police search of his house, one of Preeti's earrings is found in his room. The case is heard in Judge Rai Bahadur Devi Prasad's court, and despite the fact that Preeti risks her reputation being tarnished, she tells the court that she was with Ravi on the night of the curfew and murder and shows the court the other earring, absolving Ravi of all charges. Vijay holds her in contempt now and asks her for a divorce, even though he is informed that Preeti is pregnant with his child. Master Prem Shankar is unable to bear this onslaught on his daughter and suffers a heart attack and dies.

The story revolves around the various ethical issues on the Indian matrimonial platform, and is inherently filled with symbolism. It is worth watching for the role played by Ravi in the life of Preeti and the judgments of Vijay, unlike his father.

== Cast ==
- Avinash Wadhawan as Ravi
- Ashwini Bhave as Preeti
- Brando Bakshi as Vijay
- Deepak Saraf as Shakti Raj
- Ashok Saraf as Ramu
- Rakesh Bedi as Bholu
- Aruna Irani as Tulsi
- Kunikaa Sadanah
- Pran (actor) as Judge Rai Bahadur Devi Prasad
- A.K. Hangal as Pujari-ji of Temple
- Alok Nath as Master Prem Shankar

== Music ==
The music of the album is scored by Anuradha Paduwal's husband Arun Paduwal and the songs were popular during early 1990s. All the songs were sung by Anuradha Paudwal along with notable singers Mohammed Aziz, K.J. Yesudas, Kumar Sanu, Suresh Wadkar and Udit Narayan. Indeevar wrote the lyrics.

1. "Jab Jab Tujhko Dekhu" - Kumar Sanu, Anuradha Paudwal
2. "O Krishna You Are"- Kumar Sanu, Anuradha Paudwal
3. "Mere Liye Zaruri Pyar" - Kumar Sanu, Anuradha Paudwal
4. "Rab Jaisa Roop Tumhara" - Udit Narayan, Anuradha Paudwal
5. "Saari Duniya Pyari" - Mohammed Aziz, Anuradha Paudwal
6. "Teri Chanchal Chanchal Aankhon" - K. J. Yesudas, Anuradha Paudwal
7. "Tumhein Dil Se Chaha Tha" - Mohammed Aziz
8. "Tumhein Dil Se Chaha Tha" (version 2) - Mohammed Aziz
9. "Tune Preet Jo Mujhse Jodi" - Suresh Wadkar, Anuradha Paudwal (Raga Shivaranjani)
10. "Jai Jai Ram Ramaiya" - Anuradha Paudwal
11. "Jabse Tu Meri Zindagi Mein Aaya" - Anuradha Paudwal, Suresh Wadkar
