= Kartavya (1995 film) =

- Directed by: Raj Kanwar
- Written by: Kamlesh Pandey (dialogues)
- Screenplay by: Ranbir Pushp
- Produced by: Rahul Gupta
- Starring: Sanjay Kapoor; Juhi Chawla; Amrish Puri; Aruna Irani
- Cinematography: Harmeet Singh
- Edited by: A. Muthu
- Music by: Dilip Sen-Sameer Sen
- Production company: Prime International
- Release date: 29 September 1995 (India)
- Country: India
- Language: Hindi

Kartavya (transl. Duty) is a 1995 Indian Hindi-language action film directed by Raj Kanwar, starring Sanjay Kapoor and Juhi Chawla. Divya Bharti was initially chosen as the female lead; she had completed around 30 percent of the movie before her sudden death following a fall from her fifth-floor apartment. She was replaced by Juhi. Rediff.com found the film "embarrassing".

== Plot ==
Karan and Kajal are in love and ready to settle down and lead a happy life. But tragedy strikes as Karan's mother has a heart attack, and before she dies, Karan discovers that she was not his real mother. He is told that his actual mother is an heiress, Gayatri Singh, who lives in Sundernagar. Karan sets out for Sundernagar to confront her, and on reaching there, discovers the tragic story of his mother's life. Her stepbrother, Ugranarayan Singh, had killed her husband and had her confined in a mental asylum so that he could inherit all the wealth. Karan must now punish the people responsible for his mother's morbid state.

== Cast ==
- Sanjay Kapoor - Karan Verma (actually Gayatri Devi's son, brought up by Sharda Verma)
- Moushumi Chatterjee - Sharda Verma, Karan's foster mother
- Aruna Irani - Gayatri Devi Singh, Karan's real mother
- Raj Kiran - Suraj Singh (Karan's late father and Gayatri's husband; special cameo appearance)
- Juhi Chawla - Kajal Sahay (Karan's love interest and Ramakant Sahay's daughter)
- Saeed Jaffrey - Ramakant Sahay (Kajal's father)
- Jagdeep - P.K. Dhoot (Kajal's maternal uncle, thus brother-in-law of Ramakant)
- Amrish Puri - Thakur Ugranarayan Singh (Gayatri's evil step-brother, who kept her in a mental asylum for 22 years)
- Asha Sachdev - Roop Sundari (Ugranarayan's wife)
- Mohnish Bahl - Balbir (Ugranarayan's son)
- Ashwin Kaushal - Bhanu (Ugranarayan's son)
- Om Puri - Ghulam Rasul
- Gulshan Grover - Inspector Tribhuvan
- Pramod Moutho - Mayor Jumbo Chaudhary
- Aasif Sheikh - Vicky (Mayor's son)
- Alok Nath - Doctor Neelkanth

== Music ==
#	Songs	Singer
1.	"Dhadakta Tha Pehle Dil Mera"	Kumar Sanu, Alka Yagnik
2.	"Pardesiyo Se Puch Puch"	Sukhwinder Singh & Sadhana Sargam
3.	"Hame Kya Khabar Thi"	Kumar Sanu & Alka Yagnik
4.	"Pyar Me Dil Ka Murga Bole"	Kumar Sanu & Alka Yagnik
5.	"Ye Dil Ki Dhadkan"	Kumar Sanu & Alka Yagnik
6.	"Paradesiyon Se Puch"	Pankaj Udhas, Sukhwinder Singh
7.	"Adi Tappa Yeh Desi Mem Hai	Vinod Rathod & Kavita Krishnamurthy
8.	"Roop Nagar Ki Rani Hoon"	Poornima
9.	"Ek Baar Beta Mujhe"	Udit Narayan & Sadhana Sargam

== Divya Bharti's death ==
Divya Bharti was selected to play the role of Kajal, and completed 30% of her shooting, but due to her sudden death in April 1993, she was replaced by Chawla. Shah Rukh Khan was supposed to play the hero opposite Bharti but rejected it. Dimple Kapadia was initially supposed to play the female lead’s mother-in-law, but walked out of the film midway during the shooting due to Bharti’s death, stating that her 10-year age gap with Chawla could sabotage her career prospects. The Film Makers’ Combine banned her from taking up new projects, which was later withdrawn in 1994.
