= Police Aur Mujrim =

- DVD Cover
- Directed by: K. C. Bokadia
- Screenplay by: K.C. Bokadia
- Story by: K.C. Bokadia
- Produced by: K.C. Bokadia
- Starring: Raaj Kumar; Vinod Khanna; Meenakshi Seshadri; Nagma
- Cinematography: Peter Pereira
- Edited by: Govind Dalwadi
- Music by: Bappi Lahiri
- Production company: BMB Productions
- Release date: 24 July 1992
- Running time: 2 hours 26 min
- Country: India
- Language: Hindi

Police Aur Mujrim is a 1992 Indian Hindi-language action film produced and directed by K.C. Bokadia. It stars Raaj Kumar, Vinod Khanna, Meenakshi Seshadri and Nagma in pivotal roles.

== Plot ==
Veer Bahadur Singh, Police Commissioner of Mumbai lives with his wife, Sharda and their only daughter. When police arrest two notorious goon Shera and Jaaga, their leader Banarsi kidnaps Commissioner's daughter Jyoti. Corrupt Home Minister supports the infamous gang. DSP Vishal Khanna finally saves her but the gang decide to destroy Veer Bahadur's family. After his sister, Meena and her fiance gets slain by Banarsi, Vishal vows vengeance, Veer Bahadur sees his family slain. Vishal kills Banarsi to avenge Meena's death. Veer Bahadur kills Dharam Pal in the nearby temple. Veer Bahadur and Vishal, along with Kiran stand together.

== Cast ==
- Raaj Kumar as Police Commissioner Veer Bahadur Singh
- Vinod Khanna as DSP Vishal Khanna
- Meenakshi Seshadri as Kiran
- Nagma as Meena Khanna
- Avinash Wadhavan as Rakesh Pal
- Charan Raj as Banarsi Das
- Joginder as Jagga
- Sher Khan as Shera
- Mahavir Shah as Sanga
- Sadashiv Amrapurkar as Dharam Pal

== Soundtrack ==
Song	Singer	Lyricist
"Tum Din Ko Din Kah Do"	Udit Narayan, Anuradha Paudwal	Anjaan
"Apni Aankhon Ke Sitaron Mein"	Mohammed Aziz, Kavita Krishnamurthy	Dilip Tahir
"Dil Ghabrata Hai" (Happy)	Kumar Sanu	Anjaan
"Dil Ghabrata Hai" (Sad)	Kumar Sanu	Anjaan
"Kangana Pahna Ke Le Jaoonga"	Udit Narayan, Uttara Kelkar	Indeewar
"Mere Mehboob Tujhe"	Mohammed Aziz, Kavita Krishnamurthy	Dilip Tahir
"Pyar Mein Sauda Nahin"	Lata Mangeshkar	Anjaan
