= Deewana (1992 film) =

1992 Indian film by Raj Kanwar

- Film poster
- Directed by: Raj Kanwar
- Written by: Sagar Sarhadi
- Story by: Ranbir Pushp
- Produced by: Guddu Dhanoa; Lalit Kapoor; Raju Kothari
- Starring: Rishi Kapoor; Divya Bharti; Shah Rukh Khan; Amrish Puri
- Cinematography: Harmeet Singh
- Edited by: A. Muthu
- Music by: Nadeem-Shravan
- Production companies: Bhagwan Chitra Mandir; Mayank Arts
- Release date: 26 June 1992
- Running time: 162 minutes
- Country: India
- Language: Hindi
- Box office: ₹18 crore

Deewana (Hindi pronunciation: [diːwaːnaː], transl. Obsessed) is a 1992 Indian Hindi-language romantic action film directed by Raj Kanwar (in his directorial debut) and written by Sagar Sarhadi. It stars Rishi Kapoor, Divya Bharti, and Shah Rukh Khan in his feature film debut. The film revolves around an effervescent girl Kajal (Bharti), depicting her travails as a widow after the disappearance of her husband Ravi (Kapoor) and how her obsessive lover Raja (Khan) wins her over.

Sagar Sarhadi wrote the screenplay based on a story by Ranbir Pushp. Guddu Dhanoa, Lalit Kapoor and Raju Kothari co-produced the film under the banner, Mayank Arts. The cinematography was handled by Harmeet Singh with editing by A. Muthu. Nadeem–Shravan composed the soundtrack with lyrics penned by Sameer. The muhurat shot for the film took place on 14 July 1991.

Upon its release on 26 June 1992, Deewana was well received by critics, and emerged as a major commercial success, becoming the second-highest-grossing film of the year, with a worldwide gross of about ₹162 million (US$1.7 million), surpassed only by Beta. The soundtrack album turned out to be a chartbuster and was the highest-selling soundtrack of the year. The success of the film consolidated both Khan and Bharti's foothold in the industry, and launched Kanwar's directorial career. At the 38th Filmfare Awards, it received 9 nominations, and won 5 awards including Best Male Debut (Khan) and Best Female Debut (Bharti).

== Plot ==
Kajal, a beautiful young lady, falls in love with Ravi, a rich and handsome man. They happily marry with the blessings of Ravi's mother, Lakshmi Devi. Ravi's greedy uncle Dhirendra and cousin Narendra are disappointed to hear of this, because they are next in line to inherit the family's vast wealth after Ravi. Dhirendra hires hoodlums to murder Ravi. The hoodlums, along with Narendra, try to murder Ravi. During the struggle, Ravi manages to kill his cousin Narendra and both of them topple over a cliff. The hoodlums flee. The news reaches Ravi's family. Widowed and depressed, Kajal moves to another city along with Ravi's mother Lakshmi Devi.

Raja, a handsome, rich and good-hearted guy riding a motorcycle, accidentally knocks down Lakshmi Devi on the street, takes her to her home, and thus meets Kajal. He falls in love with Kajal, and tries to express it, but she cuts him short and reveals that she was already married and now a widow. Taken aback briefly, Raja returns with his suit, but Kajal continues to resist his advances. Raja's rich father, Ramakant, dislikes the idea of his son marrying a widow and tries to get rid of Kajal. After this, Raja quarrels with his father and begs Lakshmi Devi for her permission to marry her widowed daughter-in-law. Lakshmi Devi persuades Kajal to marry Raja, saying that Kajal has a long life ahead of her, she has no child, and will be totally alone after Lakshmi Devi's death. Kajal finally accepts at her mother-in-law's behest. Lakshmi Devi conveys the acceptance to Raja.

News of Raja's forthcoming engagement is the last straw for his father, who throws him out. Raja now has to look for a job. His friends open a garage with him. He meets with an accident and is hospitalised. Kajal rushes to see and realises that she is also in love with him. They admit their feelings for each other.

A man is attacked by a gang of ruffians waiting to rob him, and Raja saves him. They soon become good friends. Little does Raja know that this man is none other than Kajal's first husband and Lakshmi Devi's much-mourned son, Ravi.

When Raja introduces Ravi to Kajal at her birthday party, she is shocked to learn that Ravi survived Dhirendra's attempt to murder him. However, she stays with Raja. Raja soon learns that Ravi was Kajal’s first husband from a secret conversation between Ravi and Lakshmi Devi. Dhirendra learns about Ravi. He kidnaps Kajal and Raja, demanding Ravi's property in exchange. Raja escapes and beats Dhirendra along with Ravi. They find Kajal tied up with a bomb strapped around her. Ravi manages to stop the bomb timer. Dhirendra returns to kill Raja. Enraged, Ravi pushes him and sets the bomb off, causing a large explosion that kills both. Raja and Kajal honor Ravi for his sacrifice.

== Cast ==
- Rishi Kapoor as Ravi
- Divya Bharti as Kajal
- Shah Rukh Khan as Raja Sahai
- Amrish Puri as Dhirendra Pratap Singh
- Alok Nath as Mr. Sharma
- Deven Verma as Devdas Sabrangi
- Asha Sachdev as Chandramukh
- Dalip Tahil as Ramakant Sahai
- Sushma Seth as Laxmi Devi
- Mohnish Bahl as Narendra Pratap Singh
- Brahmachari as Chintamani

== Production ==
=== Development ===
In the early 1990s, Ranbir Pushp conceived the story of Deewana, and Guddu Dhanoa decided to bankroll the film under his own production banner, Mayank Arts. In an interview to Rediff.com, Raj Kanwar, who had previously worked as an assistant director to Shekhar Kapur in films such as Mr. India (1987) and Ghayal (1990), revealed that he was approached by Dhanoa to direct Deewana, making it his directorial debut. Lalit Kapoor and Raju Kothari co–produced the film along with Dhanoa.

=== Casting ===
Rishi Kapoor was Raj Kanwar's first choice. He was given a remuneration of ₹1 million (US$11,000). For the female lead, Madhuri Dixit was Kanwar's initial choice. Her unavailability and lack of dates led to the casting of Divya Bharti, on the recommendation of Guddu Dhanoa's friend and the former's manager, Jatin Rajguru. Dhanoa addressed Bharti to be "time-punctual" and that once she refused to get off her car as she had come a bit late for the shoot.

Kanwar had several actors in mind for the role of Raja. Sunny Deol, Anil Kapoor, Govinda and Nagarjuna were considered before Armaan Kohli was signed. Kohli had shot for a few days but was removed due to a misunderstanding between him and Shabnam Kapoor, the wife of Lalit Kapoor, one of the producers of the film on the sets of Insaaf Ki Devi (1992). Shah Rukh Khan, then a budding artist, was selected as his replacement. Kanwar had liked his performance in Circus and Dil Dariya and thus suggested his name to the producers. Khan worked in the film alongside his prior commitments to Raju Ban Gaya Gentleman (1992), his other film which was supposed to mark his debut. He expressed his joy on hearing that Rishi Kapoor was his costar.

=== Filming ===
Principal photography took place in and around Mumbai and Ooty. The songs were shot across various locations in Ooty, such as the Botanical Gardens and Ooty Lake.

== Music ==
Deewana

Soundtrack album by Nadeem-Shravan
- Released: 1992
- Recorded: 46:57
- Genre: Film soundtrack
- Label: Venus Music
- Producer: Nadeem-Shravan

Nadeem-Shravan chronology
| Paayal (1992) | Deewana (1992) | Bekhudi (1992) |

The soundtrack album features 7 songs composed by duo Nadeem-Shravan. The lyrics were written by Sameer. Kumar Sanu playbacked for Kapoor, Sadhana Sargam and Alka Yagnik for Divya and Vinod Rathod for Khan. The album sold between 7 million and 8 million units, making it the best-selling Bollywood soundtrack album of 1992.

The soundtrack was #79 on the list of "100 Greatest Bollywood Soundtracks of All Time", as compiled by Planet Bollywood. News18 included "Aisi Deewangi" as one of the "5 Memorable Songs of Divya Bharti" and raved about her presence in it by saying that it made "people swoon over her as well the tune. Her effortless beauty, along with her charming on-screen chemistry with Shahrukh Khan multiplied the X-Factors and made it a delightful watch." Rediff listed it among the "10 Amazing Nadeem-Shravan songs".

Deewana track listing
| No. | Title | Singer(s) | Length |
|---|---|---|---|
| 1. | "Sochenge Tumhe Pyar" (Raga Kalyan) | Kumar Sanu | 06:03 |
| 2. | "Teri Umeed Tera Intezar 1" | Kumar Sanu and Sadhana Sargam | 06:19 |
| 3. | "Teri Umeed Tera Intezar 2" | Kumar Sanu and Sadhana Sargam | 02:13 |
| 4. | "Payaliya" | Kumar Sanu and Alka Yagnik | 07:57 |
| 5. | "Teri Isi Ada Pe Sanam" | Kumar Sanu and Sadhana Sargam | 05:12 |
| 6. | "Koi Na Koi Chahiye" | Vinod Rathod | 06:23 |
| 7. | "Aisi Deewangi" | Alka Yagnik and Vinod Rathod | 06:59 |
| 8. | "Tere Dard Se Dil" | Kumar Sanu | 04:51 |
| Total length: | | | 46:57 |

== Release ==
The film was released on 25 June 1992. It was promoted with the tagline, "The Power of Love". When director Raj Kanwar had gone to attend the first screening of the film, along with the distributors, he was shocked to find the theatre deserted. Later, they found it swarming with mostly college kids, and eventually the film became a blockbuster. It ran at theatres for 50 weeks and emerged a golden jubilee film. (Note: A golden jubilee film is one that completes a theatrical run of 50 weeks or 300 days.) According to the film-trade website Box Office India, it collected ₹140 million (US$1.5 million) worldwide and became the second highest-grossing film of the year, surpassed only by Beta. It was made available for streaming on Amazon Prime Video in 2020.

=== Reception ===
Deewana received positive reviews from critics upon release, with major praise directed towards its cinematography, soundtrack and the cast performances, particularly that of Bharti and Khan. Nikhat Kazmi published a review of the film in The Times of India on 28 June 1992, writing that Khan's role is clichéd but he was able to "interpret it with a fresh zeal and wafts across like a breeze in the traditional role of a young man obsessed with love. Angry, confused, tender, mature and childishly rebellious, Deewana marks the advent of a new talent". On 31 July, a writer in The Indian Express praised the film's cinematography and songs but was critical to its story which he called "no more than a routine melodrama". The writer added that Bharti had a "pretty ... but ... thin" role and "there is nothing she can do about it". He further observed that Khan is "fairly impressive and brings some life to a conventional role". In an interview, while reviewing the film by himself, Khan said that his performance in the film was "awful–loud, vulgar and uncontrolled" and that he "overacted terribly" in it. According to him, he hasn't contributed anyway to the film's success, and credited Nadeem–Shravan's music for the same, while also praising the performances of Kapoor and Bharti. Modern film reviewers, however, appreciate the performances of Deewana. In 2007, Anupama Chopra said that the film established Khan's position as a leading actor of Hindi cinema, despite his "over-the-top" performance. Rachit Gupta of Filmfare in 2014 stated, "Divya seemed at ease sharing screen space with Rishi Kapoor. She also matched Shah Rukh Khan's manic intensity emotion to emotion. She fit perfectly into the character of a woman dealing with the loss of her husband." In 2018, Sampada Sharma from The Indian Express wrote that her performance is unforgettable, adding, "From playing a newly married girl to being the one who is at a crossroads in her life, Deewana was Divya's film and she delivered a performance that was applause-worthy."

=== Accolades ===
| Award | Category | Recipient(s) | Results | Ref. |
|---|---|---|---|---|
| 38th Filmfare Awards (1993) | Face of the Year | Divya Bharti | Won | |
| 38th Filmfare Awards (1993) | Best Male Debut | Shah Rukh Khan | Won | |
| 38th Filmfare Awards (1993) | Best Music Director | Nadeem-Shravan | Won | |
| 38th Filmfare Awards (1993) | Best Lyricist | Sameer (for "Aisi Deewangi") | Nominated | |
| 38th Filmfare Awards (1993) | Best Lyricist | Sameer (for "Teri Umeed Tera Intezaar") | Won | |
| 38th Filmfare Awards (1993) | Best Male Playback Singer | Kumar Sanu (for "Sochenge Tumhe Pyar") | Won | |
| 38th Filmfare Awards (1993) | Best Male Playback Singer | Vinod Rathod (for "Aisi Deewangi") | Nominated | |
| 38th Filmfare Awards (1993) | Best Female Playback Singer | Alka Yagnik (for "Aisi Deewangi") | Nominated | |

== Theme ==
Deewana deals with the central theme of love. Raj Kanwar compared the role of Divya Bharti to that of female roles in his other films like Laadla (1994), Jaan (1996), Jeet (1996) and Judaai (1997) stating that they all were "strong female characters", portraying either the plight of women or displaying the acting prowess of the respective actresses. The film also shows how individuals become "obsessed" while in love, through the character of Khan. He himself talked about this as a lesson he learnt from the film while at University of Edinburgh to receive an honorary degree. Several critics compared Rishi Kapoor's role to that in Chandni (1989) for being portrayed as the sacrificing husband. In another aspect, Deewana emerged as the pathbreaking Bollywood love triangle with its storyline portraying the first husband to be the sacrificer, a reversal of the general rule.

== Legacy ==
Deewana has been regarded as one of the earlier Indian films dealing with the social stigma of widow remarriage. The film's music, composed by the duo Nadeem-Shravan, became a multi-platinum success. Bharti's performance fetched her critical appreciation; the film's title became synonymous with her. The film is also notable for being the film debut of Shah Rukh Khan. Despite having limited screen presence in the second half of the film, his portrayal of an obsessive lover achieved him a major career breakthrough. The song "Koi Na Koi Chahiye" picturised on him has gradually gathered a cult following. Ashok Raj described his role as "A small-town commoner who stalks a rich widow to gain access to a prosperous lifestyle." News18 remarks that Kapoor's "filmography came to a head" with Deewana and that it remains it to be one of his most memorable works, his fashion in the film being considered a trendsetter for himself.

Additionally, Deewana has been included in many listings—"500 Greatest Bollywood Movies of the 80s, 90s and 2000s", "Top 90 Hindi Movies Of The 1990s" and "100 Greatest Bollywood Love Triangle Movies". The soundtrack album was featured by Planet Bollywood among the "100 Greatest Bollywood Soundtracks" with a conclusion that "Deewana was simply one of the best albums of the 90s". India Today ranked Deewana first as one of the "Top Films of Raj Kanwar". Filmfare featured it in their listing of "16 Best Shah Rukh Khan Movies". Rediff.com has placed the film twice in its listing of "Top 20 soundtracks of Nadeem–Shravan" and "10 Amazing Nadeem–Shravan songs". The scene where Khan confronts Bharti and throws red colour on her white saree to confess his love to her was included by NDTV as one of the "Top 10 Holi scenes from Bollywood". Diptakirti Chaudhuri, a film critic, hailed Deewana to be a pathbreaking film in Bollywood, as it showed a complete contrast to the general storyline of love triangles.

The film has been referenced many times in the following years. In Pehla Nasha (1993), Khan says to Deepak Tijori, "You have done a miracle... I have become a crazy fan (Deewana) of you." In the "Chennai Express Special - Part 2" episode of the popular television sitcom Taarak Mehta Ka Ooltah Chashmah, Popatlal dances along the song "Koi Na Koi Chahiye". The film's poster is shown in the film Dhanak. Footage from Deewana is also shown in Fan.

Khan and Kapoor reunited again in Om Shanti Om and Jab Tak Hai Jaan in 2007 and 2012, respectively. In both films, Khan played the lead and Kapoor was in a cameo.

== See also ==
- Biyer Phul, 1999 Bangladeshi remake

== Bibliography ==
- Arunachalam, Param. BollySwar: 1991 - 2000. Mavrix Infotech Private Limited. ISBN 8193848217. Archived from the original on 17 July 2021.
- Bose, Derek (October 2006). Brand Bollywood: A New Global Entertainment Order. SAGE Publishing. ISBN 978-81-32102-78-6. Archived from the original on 17 July 2021.
- Chopra, Anupama (2007). King of Bollywood: Shah Rukh Khan and the Seductive World of Indian Cinema. Grand Central Publishing. ISBN 978-0-446-50898-8.
- O'Brien, Derek (2014). Derek Introduces: 100 Iconic Indians. Rupa Publications. ISBN 978-81-291-3413-4.
- Patel, Bhaichand (2012). Bollywood's Top 20: Superstars of Indian Cinema. Penguin Books India. ISBN 978-0-670-08572-9. Archived from the original on 30 December 2016.
- Mishra, Vijay (2002). Bollywood Cinema: Temples of Desire. Routledge. ISBN 978-0-415-93015-4. Archived from the original on 17 June 2016.
- Raj, Ashok (1 November 2009). Hero Vol.2, Volume 2. Hay House, Inc. ISBN 978-93-81398-03-6. Archived from the original on 30 December 2016.
