= Ek Ladka Ek Ladki =

1992 Hindi-language romantic comedy film

- Theatrical release poster
- Directed by: Vijay Sadanah
- Written by: Saleem Agha
- Produced by: D.D.Yande
- Starring: Salman Khan; Neelam Kothari
- Cinematography: S.L. Sharma
- Edited by: Omkar Bhakri
- Music by: Anand–Milind
- Release date: 19 June 1992
- Running time: 162 minutes
- Country: India
- Language: Hindi

Ek Ladka Ek Ladki (translation: A boy and a girl) is a 1992 Indian Hindi romantic comedy film directed by Vijay Sadanah, starring Salman Khan and Neelam Kothari. It is a remake of the 1987 Bengali film Samrat O Shundori, which itself is based on 1987 American film Overboard.

== Plot ==
Bhagwati Prasad (Anupam Kher) looks after the vast estate of his deceased brother, assisted by his wife, and brother-in-law, Markutey. Bhagwati has gotten into debt and has been embezzling money in order to pay his debtors. His spoiled and rude niece, Renuka (Neelam), who resides in the United States decides to pay them a visit. Bhagwati welcomes her and makes her feel at home, but Renuka is not easily satisfied until she gets a speedboat so that she can be on her own. Alerted by her lawyer, she starts to scrutinize recent transactions and finds 1.5 million rupees missing. She asks Bhagwati to provide her with an explanation within 2 days. Then she gets into her speed boat, only to get involved in an accident, planned by Bhagwati, and disappears.

She was saved by some of the fishermen nearby and was handed over to the police. Police then look for her family members as she suffers from amnesia, due to the accident. After no one shows up for a long time, Raja (Salman Khan) takes advantage of this only to take revenge for an old encounter between them. He proves to the police that Renuka is his lost wife by telling of a mark on her lower back. Raja tells her that they have three kids together and the kids help him in lying to her. In truth, the kids are his dead brother's boys.

Raja, makes her realise the pain of a poor person in this way, but soon realises how much she has grown to care for him and the kids. Soon, they start loving each other. Bhagwati is all set to take over the estate when the estate's lawyer gets a court order freezing all the cash, bank, and assets until such time Renu is found or her body is located. As the months go by, Bhagwati hires men to look for Renuka, and they soon find her and lead him to her. Bhagwati finds out that she has lost her memory, and is living with a man named Raja and his three young nephews. This time, Bhagwati will make sure that she will not escape alive, even if it means killing Raja and the three children as well. Renuka regains her memories after recognizing her uncle Bhagwati Prasad.

In the end, the police arrive at the scene and arrest Bhagwati and his crooks. She realises that Raja betrayed her by not telling her the truth. In the end, before leaving for the US she also realises that the kids and she herself can't stay without each other, and she loves Raja too. This forces her to stay back, as she gives them a surprise after she reaches home before Raja and the kids, as they went in search of her at the airport. In the epilogue, it is shown that Raja and Renuka are living together happily with the three boys who now permanently call them mummy-papa, and also have a daughter of their own now.

== Cast ==
- Salman Khan as Raja
- Neelam Kothari as Renuka /Rani
- Govardhan Asrani as Markutey
- Tiku Talsania as Police Inspector
- Javed Khan Amrohi as Police Constable
- Shubha Khote as Mrs. Prasad
- Anupam Kher as Bhagwati Prasad
- Salim Khan Ding-Dong as Chichu
- Subbiraj as Lawyer
- Sumeet Pathak as Chotu
- Arun Mathur as School Principal
- Mushtaq Khan as School Teacher

== Soundtrack ==
Ek Ladka Ek Ladki

Soundtrack album by Anand–Milind
- Released: 1992
- Genre: Feature film soundtrack
- Label: Tips
- Producer: Anand–Milind

Anand–Milind chronology
Dil Aashna Hai (1992)	Ek Ladka Ek Ladki (1992)	Ghar Jamai (1992)

Title	Singer(s)	Lyricist
"Choti Si Duniya Mohabbat Ki"	Udit Narayan & Sadhana Sargam	Vijay Sadanah
"Aao Jhoomein Naachein"	Udit Narayan & Sadhana Sargam	Majrooh Sultanpuri
"Kitna Pyar Tumhein Karte Hain"	Kumar Sanu & Sadhana Sargam	Majrooh Sultanpuri
"Ek Ladka Ek Ladki"	Udit Narayan & Neelam Kothari	Majrooh Sultanpuri
"Ande Se Aayi Murgi"	Amit Kumar & Sadhana Sargam	Majrooh Sultanpuri
"Phool Yeh Nahin Armaan"	Suresh Wadkar & Kavita Krishnamurthy	Majrooh Sultanpuri
