= Dushman Zamana =

- Film poster
- Directed by: Jagdish A. Sharma
- Produced by: Vijay Sharma
- Starring: Armaan Kohli; Divya Bharti
- Music by: Mahesh Kishore
- Production company: Matushree Films
- Release date: 2 October 1992
- Country: India
- Language: Hindi

Dushman Zamana (transl. The era of enemies) is a 1992 Indian action film directed by Jagdish A. Sharma. It stars Armaan Kohli and Divya Bharti in the leading roles.

== Plot ==
Seema is a dreamy young college student born into a wealthy family. Her father D. K. Narang is a successful businessman and, unlike Seema, very money-minded. Seema's schoolmate Vijay is a poor orphan who does very well in his studies with the aim to some day be able to afford a better life. Unaware of the consequences, Seema soon falls in love with Vijay and they both become a couple, while keeping it a secret. In class, Seema dreamily writes Vijay's name on a sheet of paper which later gets discovered by her father. He finds out about Vijay's poor background and opposes the relationship between his daughter and Vijay. When asked about her preference to whether stay with her father and keep living a wealthy lifestyle or stay with Vijay and live the life of a poor woman, Seema chooses Vijay out of love. Her father sees himself forced to get his daughter back in another way by hiring a criminal Sanga to frame Vijay for murder.

== Cast ==
- Armaan Kohli as Vijay
- Divya Bharti as Seema
- Paresh Rawal as D. K. Narang
- Gulshan Grover as Thapa
- Kiran Kumar as Sanga
- Mukri as Mickey Seth
- Anoop Kumar as Security Guard
- Firoz Irani as Sohan Kapoor
- Ishrat Ali as Agnihotri
- Dinesh Hingoo as Shamsher Singh
- Bhushan Jeevan as Police Commissioner

== Soundtrack ==
The music was given by Kishore Sharma and Mahesh Sharma.

- "Meri Jaan Main Tere Ishq Mein" - Mohammed Aziz, Shobha Joshi
- "Dil Ye Pukare Aaja Sanam Tujhko Mohabbat Ki" - Kavita Krishnamurthy
- "Mohabbat Ki Kitabon Mein Yeh Baat Likhi Hai" (Female) - Kavita Krishnamurthy
- "Mohabbat Ki Kitabon Mein Yeh Baat Likhi Hai" (Male) - Kumar Sanu
- "Mausam Pyaara Bheega Bheega Tan Man Mein" - Kumar Sanu, Alka Yagnik
