= Radha Ka Sangam =

- Theatrical release poster
- Directed by: Kirti Kumar
- Screenplay by: Jainendra Jain
- Produced by: Kirti Kumar; Govinda
- Starring: Govinda; Juhi Chawla
- Cinematography: Thomas Xavier
- Edited by: R. Rajendran
- Music by: Anu Malik
- Production company: Sri Nirmala Devi Productions
- Release date: 31 July 1992
- Running time: 156 minutes
- Country: India
- Language: Hindi

Radha Ka Sangam is a 1992 Hindi romance film directed and produced by Kirti Kumar. The film features Govinda, Juhi Chawla, Kirti Kumar as main characters.

== Plot ==
Radha Ka Sangam is based on re-incarnation. It is shown that Govinda and Radha love each other and they get married, but after the marriage, things do not go in their favour. A lot of tragic incidents happen in their lives. Govinda gets a jail sentence and Radha is also not well outside. When Govinda gets out of jail, another tragedy strikes. Do they meet in their next birth? What happens next?

== Cast ==
- Govinda as Govinda / Kamalnain
- Juhi Chawla as Radha / Roopa
- Kirti Kumar as Chandar
- Mala Sinha as Thakurain
- Kiran Kumar as Thakur Sumer Singh
- Disco Shanti as Shama Bai
- Ragesh Asthana

== Music ==
The music of the film was composed by Anu Malik and the lyrics were penned by Hasrat Jaipuri and Shaily Shailendra.

Title	Singer(s)
"Prem Hai Janmo Ka Sangam"	Sukhwinder Singh and Anuradha Paudwal
"Bichhuwa More Sajna Ka Pyar"	Lata Mangeshkar and Suresh Wadkar
"O Radha Tere Bina Tera Shayam Hai Aadha"	Lata Mangeshkar and Shabbir Kumar
"Do Bol Kehke Hum To Haare Hain"	Lata Mangeshkar and Kirti Kumar
"Banna Mera Aaya Hariyala"	Suresh Wadkar and Anuradha Paudwal
"Kanha Kanha Kanha"	Anuradha Paudwal
"Pinjara Banaya Chandni Ki"	Kirti Kumar
