= Dil Aashna Hai =

1992 film directed by Hema Malini

- Theatrical release poster
- Directed by: Hema Malini
- Written by: Iqbal Durrani; Suraj Sanim (dialogues)
- Screenplay by: Imtiaz Hussain
- Story by: Imtiaz Hussain; Hema Malini
- Produced by: Hema Malini
- Starring: Jeetendra; Mithun Chakraborty; Shah Rukh Khan; Amrita Singh; Sonu Walia; Divya Bharti; Dimple Kapadia
- Cinematography: Peter Pereira
- Edited by: V. N. Mayekar
- Music by: Anand–Milind
- Production company: H. M. Creations
- Release date: 25 December 1992
- Running time: 164 minutes
- Country: India
- Language: Hindi

Dil Aashna Hai (transl. The Heart Knows) is a 1992 Indian Hindi-language romance film produced and directed by Hema Malini (in her directorial debut) under the H. M. Creations banner. It stars Shah Rukh Khan and Divya Bharti in lead roles with Jeetendra, Mithun Chakraborty, Dimple Kapadia, Amrita Singh and Sonu Walia playing other pivotal roles. The music was composed by Anand–Milind. The film is adapted from the TV miniseries Lace which was based on the novel of the same name by author Shirley Conran.

This was the first film Shahrukh Khan signed in 1991 but Deewana ended up releasing first and marking his debut in Bollywood

== Plot ==
Laila is a cabaret dancer in Digvijay Singh's five-star hotel. One day, Laila receives a phone call from her mother who is on her deathbed. She tells her that Laila is her adopted child. Karan falls in love with Laila and helps her in the search for her real mother.

The search leads them to Razia, who divulges the story from 18 years ago. Three college friends - Barkha, Rajalaxmi and Salma were in love with their respective boyfriends - Sunil, Prince Arjun, and Akram. when one of them becomes pregnant they rent a house until the baby is delivered. When the baby is six months old, they leave her with Razia promising that the first one amongst them to get married will adopt her. Yet none of them ever comes back.

Karan finds out that Barkha is now the health and welfare minister, Rajalaxmi is married to Prince Arjun and trains polo horses, and Salma who is married to Akram is the principal of St. Teresa's college. The three women are no longer in touch with each other.

Karan and Laila invite the three women to a dance show. When Laila confronts them to reveal the truth about her birth mother, they all leave. It is revealed that Salma was the first one to get married but was scared to tell her in-laws about the existence of the baby girl.

Digvijay Singh throws Laila out of his hotel. When she is about to get attacked by a street gang, Prince Arjun rescues her. During a Diwali party, when a guest insults Laila, Barkha reveals that she is Sitara's mother. Barkha tells Sitara that her father had left for the USA for some kind of military training and she had never heard from him again. Barkha goes to submit her resignation following the scandal. Rajalaxmi and Salma visit Sitara. Thugs sent by Digvijay Singh and Govardhan Das kidnap all of them. Karan goes to their rescue with Barkha and Prince Arjun. Sunil, a navy officer, turn up on the scene. Digvijay Singh shoots the goon. All is well that ends well.

== Cast ==
- Jeetendra as Prince Arjun Singh
- Mithun Chakraborty as Sunil
- Dimple Kapadia as Barkha
- Amrita Singh as Rajlaxmi Singh
- Sonu Walia as Salma Baig
- Kabir Bedi as Rai Bahadur Digvijay Singh
- Divya Bharti as Laila / Sitara
- Shah Rukh Khan as Karan Singh
- Naseer Abdullah as Akram Allahabadi Baig
- Pankaj Udhas as himself (friendly appearance)
- Raza Murad as Govardhan Das
- Amarjeet Mukherjee as Chandu
- Farida Jalal as Razia
- Beena Banerjee as Shobha Singh
- Sushma Seth as Mrs. Baig
- Sulabha Deshpande as Lady at the Orphanage
- Mohan Agashe as Prem (pimp)
- Satyen Kappu as Rajlaxmi's dad

== Soundtrack ==
No.	Title	Singer(s)	Length
1.	"Dil Aashna Hai"	Sadhana Sargam, Suresh Wadkar	05:01
2.	"Ho Abhi To Hui Jawan"	Kavita Krishnamurthy	06:38
3.	"Bhool Ke Din"	Abhijeet Bhattacharya, Sudesh Bhosle, Padmini Kolhapure, Kavita Krishnamurthy, Sadhana Sargam, Bhupinder Singh	06:22
4.	"Dil Aashna Hai (Sad)"	Sadhana Sargam	03:09
5.	"Rangeen Haseen Raat Ho"	Kavita Krishnamurthy	05:59
6.	"Ek Dil Ek Jaan (1)"	Kavita Krishnamurthy, Aparna Mayekar, Sadhana Sargam	04:09
7.	"Ek Dil Ek Jaan (2)"	Kavita Krishnamurthy, Aparna Mayekar, Sadhana Sargam	03:59
8.	"Dance Music"	Instrumental	02:11
9.	"Kisi Ne Bhi To Na Dekha"	Pankaj Udhas	06:03
Total length:			43:31

== Reception ==
Despite the film appealing to a niche audience due to its progressive theme; the late Divya Bharti as the central protagonist was impressive and it is considered one of her best performances. It was one of Shahrukh Khan's early romantic roles and his chemistry with Divya Bharti (whom he also co-starred with in his debut film Deewana (1992), was appreciated.
