= Jaan Se Pyaara =

- Promotional Poster
- Directed by: Anand
- Written by: Jainendra Jain
- Produced by: Anand
- Starring: Govinda; Divya Bharti; Raza Murad; Kiran Kumar; Aruna Irani
- Cinematography: Shashikant Kabre
- Edited by: Subhash Gupta
- Music by: Anand–Milind
- Release date: 1992
- Country: India
- Language: Hindi

Jaan Se Pyaara (transl. Dearer than life itself) is a 1992 Indian Hindi-language action film directed by Anand. It stars Govinda (in dual roles) and Divya Bharti, with Aruna Irani, Kiran Kumar and Raza Murad in supporting roles. It is an unofficial remake of Heart of Dragon (1985) and the concept of one actor playing the role of both brothers, unlike in the original version, was borrowed from the 1990 Kannada remake of Heart of Dragon, Shivashankar.

== Synopsis ==
The film shows police Inspector Jai living a middle-class life with his mother and physically and mentally challenged brother Sundar. One day he arrests Pandey, and after questioning him, finds out that the person behind the crime was Guman Singh. He arrests Guman. A series of explosions creates havoc in the city. The bombers demand Guman's unconditional release. The police comply. They threaten Jai with dire consequences, forcing Jai to resign from his job.

Hoping that he and his family are safe, Jai starts to re-build his life, along with his sweetheart, Sharmila who was an orphan. Then his mother is killed in an accident, and his brother is abducted by Jagtap Singh and Guman, who demand that he return a bag containing their valuables. Jai is willing to do anything to get back his brother. Jhatap Singh and Guman Singh tell Jay that if he doesn't return the box they will kill his brother. Sundar had hidden the bag and children who were playing with him tell Jai where it is. Jai brings the box to Jagtap Singh, but they don't release Sundar. Jai rescues his brother and starts fighting with them. Jagtap Singh says that he had killed Jai's mother. When Sundar hears that, Sundar starts fighting with Jagtap Singh, while Jai fights Gunman Singh. Sundar kills Jagtap Singh and Jai kills Guman Singh. Jay takes his brother to hospital where he recovers.

== Cast ==
- Govinda in dual roles as
  - Inspector Jai; Sundar's elder brother; Sharmila's love interest
  - Sundar; Jai's disabled younger brother
- Divya Bharti as Sharmila; Jai's love interest
- Aruna Irani as Jai and Sundar's mother
- Raza Murad as Guman Singh
- Kiran Kumar as Jagtap Singh
- Suresh Chatwal as Minister Mishra
- Rajendra Gupta as Superintendent of Police, Ramlal Gupta
- Dinesh Hingoo as School Principal
- Irshad Hashmi as Tandon, Press Reporter
- Piloo Wadia as Mrs. Pestonjee

== Songs ==
The music was given by Anand–Milind. The song "Bin Tere kuch Bhi" was based on the Kannada song "Yendendu Ninnanu Maretu" from Eradu Kanasu.

#	Title	Duration	Singer(s)
1	"Bin Tere Kuchh Bhi"	[6:58]	Udit Narayan and Sadhana Sargam
2	"Chanchal Chandni Mehki Raat Hai"	[6:17]	Abhijeet Bhattacharya and Kavita Krishnamurthy
3	"Ek Ladka Tha"	[4:49]	Mohammed Aziz and Anuradha Paudwal
4	"Raj Dulara Too Meri"(Female)	[6:13]	Sadhana Sargam
5	"Raj Dulara Too Meri" (Sad)	[1:18]	Sadhana Sargam
6	"Raj Dulara Too Meri" (Male)	[6:11]	Abhijeet Bhattacharya
7	"Tale Lagale Pehere Bithale"	[5:41]	Amit Kumar and Sadhana Sargam
8	"Bin Tere Kuchh Bhi" (Unofficial Version)	-	Sonu Nigam and Sadhna Sargam
