= Shola Aur Shabnam (1992 film) =

Indian action romantic comedy film

Shola aur Shabnam
- Poster
- Directed by: David Dhawan
- Written by: Screenplay: Rajeev Kaul; Praful Parekh; Dialogues: Anees Bazmee
- Produced by: Pahlaj Nihalani
- Starring: Govinda; Divya Bharti
- Cinematography: Siba Mishra
- Edited by: David Dhawan
- Music by: Songs: Bappi Lahiri; Lyrics: Anjaan; Govinda
- Distributed by: Chiragdeep International
- Release date: 23 January 1992
- Running time: 175 minutes
- Country: India
- Language: Hindi
- Box office: ₹10.7 crore (equivalent to ₹90 crore or US$9.3 million in 2026)

Shola Aur Shabnam (transl. Flame and Dew drops) is a 1992 Indian Hindi-language action romantic comedy film directed and edited by David Dhawan and written by Anees Bazmee, Rajeev Kaul and Praful Parekh. It stars Govinda, Divya Bharti, with Gulshan Grover, Mohnish Behl, Aloknath, Bindu, Anupam Kher. The film revolves around the travails of a NCC student Karan (Govinda). In a 2026 interview, Dhawan revealed that it was inspired by two 1990 Hindi movies: the first half by Dil and the second half by Ghayal.

Initially titled Khiladi, the film was meant to be the debut film of Divya Bharti. But it was delayed owing to censorship problems. She then made her acting debut with the Telugu film Bobbili Raja. Siba Mishra handled the cinematography, while David Dhawan directed as well as edited the film. Anees Bazmee, Praful Parekh and Rajiv Kaul penned the screenplay. Bappi Lahiri composed the music. Govinda made his singing debut with this film. He sang the song “Gori Gori O Banke Chhori” in this film and he also wrote the lyrics himself. It was distributed by Nihalani's banner, Chiragdeep International.

Juhi Chawla was first to be signed in this film. But Divya Bharti was signed in this film only at the behest of Govinda.

The film became the huge commercial success and fourth highest-grossing Indian film of 1992, it grossed about ₹10.7 crore (US$9.3 million) and provided breakthrough to its cast members. Anupam Kher received acclaim for his portrayal of Major Indramohan Lathi and was nominated for Best Comic Actor at the 38th Filmfare Awards, but won for Khel instead.

== Plot ==
The spoiled and arrogant brother, Bali (Mohnish Behl), of notorious gangster, Kali Baba (Gulshan Grover), enlists in the National Cadet Corps, and wants to have his way with his fellow-students and trainer, Inder Mohan Lathi (Anupam Kher), with comical results. When he meets Divya Thapa (Divya Bharti) for the first time, he is smitten by her, and wants to be with her by hook or by crook. But Divya is in love with Karan (Govinda), and both plan to be with each other. Circumstances act against them, and they flee together, with Kali Baba's men, and Divya's Police Commissioner dad, Yashpal Thapa (Alok Nath), in hot pursuit, to an unknown destination, surrounded by a web of lies, deception, and no known resource to assist them.

== Cast ==
- Govinda as Karan
- Divya Bharti as Divya Thapa
- Gulshan Grover as Kalishankar
- Mohnish Behl as Bali
- Aloknath as Police Commissioner, Yashpal Thapa, Divya Father
- Reema Lagoo as Sharda Thapa, Divya's Mother
- Bindu as Girl's Hostel Principal Mona
- Anupam Kher as Major Indramohan Lathi
- Sudha Chandran as Rama, Karan's Sister
- Madhu Kambikar as Sunita, Karan's mother
- Raja Bundela as Raja
- Satyajeet as Satya
- Girish Malik as Girish
- Anil Dhawan as Inspector Anil
- Mahavir Shah as Inspector Mahadev
- Govind Namdeo as Inspector Kashinath Tiwari
- Harish Patel as Velji
- Guddi Maruti as Guddi
- Shakti Kapoor as Boxer Deva (Special Appearance)
- Archana Puran Singh as Mrs. Deva (Special Appearance)
- Mac Mohan as Jaichand
- Sudhir as Brij

== Soundtrack ==
Shola Aur Shabnam

Soundtrack album by Bappi Lahiri
- Released: 23 January 1992
- Genre: Hindi Film Soundtrack
- Label: Venus Music
- Producer: Bappi Lahiri

The music of the film was composed by Bappi Lahiri. It consisted of five songs. The music was released on the Venus Music label. Lyrics were penned by Anjaan and Govinda.

=== Track listing ===
| No. | Title | Lyrics | Performer(s) | Length |
|---|---|---|---|---|
| 1. | "Bole Bole Dil Mera Bole" | Anjaan | Abhijeet Bhattacharya & Chorus | 6:49 |
| 2. | "Gori Gori O Baanki Chhori" | Govinda | Govinda | 7:12 |
| 3. | "Jane De Jane De Mujhe Jane De" | Anjaan | Amit Kumar & Kavita Krishnamurthy | 5:36 |
| 4. | "Tere Mere Pyar Mein" | Anjaan | Alka Yagnik, Debashish Dasgupta & Shailendra Singh | 7:08 |
| 5. | "Tu Pagal Premi Awara" | Anjaan | Shabbir Kumar & Kavita Krishnamurthy | 8:31 |

== Release ==
=== Box office ===
Shola Aur Shabnam was released on 23 January 1992. It was a blockbuster, eventually becoming one of the highest-grossers in the career of Govinda. It grossed ₹10.7 crore (US$9.3 million) against a minimal budget of ₹3 crore. Adjusted for inflation, its box office gross is equal to ₹70 crore as of 2020.

=== Reception ===
The film received mixed reviews upon release. Sukanya Verma from Rediff.com praised the performances of Govinda, Divya Bharti and Anupam Kher, but was critical to its story which she addressed to be a "comic-romantic-potboiler" and that in the film "logic is entirely tossed out of the window". Rachit Gupta from Filmfare was appreciative of Divya, stating that she "seemed at ease switching between comedy and romance as she matched Govinda step to step". He also deemed the scenes of conflict between NCC cadet boys headed by Govinda and girl guides headed by Divya as "particularly memorable".

== Awards ==
38th Filmfare Awards:

Nominated

- Best Comic Actor - Anupam Kher
