= Insaaf Ki Devi =

- Theatrical release poster
- Directed by: S. A. Chandrasekhar
- Written by: Shabd Kumar (dialogues)
- Screenplay by: S. A. Chandrasekhar
- Story by: Shobha
- Produced by: B. S. Shaad; Shabnam Kapoor
- Starring: Jeetendra; Rekha
- Cinematography: Manmohan Singh
- Edited by: Subhash Sehgal
- Music by: Bappi Lahiri
- Production company: AMIT – BRAR Arts
- Release date: 31 January 1992
- Running time: 150 minutes
- Country: India
- Language: Hindi

Insaaf Ki Devi (transl. Goddess of Justice) is a 1992 Indian Hindi action film, it was produced by B. S. Shaad and Shabnam Kapoor under the AMIT – BRAR Arts banner and directed by S. A. Chandrasekhar. It stars Jeetendra and Rekha with music composed by Bappi Lahiri.

== Cast ==
- Jeetendra as Inspector Santosh Verma
- Rekha as Sadhana Verma
- Shakti Kapoor as Suraj Prakash
- Kader Khan as Advocate Kaanoonilal
- Yograj Singh as Sub-Inspector Ajay Singh
- Upasna Singh as Chandramukhi
- Sudha Chandran as Seeta
- Anju Mahendru as Police Commissioner Geeta Mathur

== Soundtrack ==
Indeevar wrote all songs.

Song	Singer
"Tum Hamen Dekho"	Bappi Lahiri
"Tum Hamen Dekho"	Lata Mangeshkar
"Kashmir Se Leke"	Asha Bhosle
"Sun Mere Sajna"	Asha Bhosle
"Tumbi Tumbi"	Asha Bhosle, Amit Kumar
"Aankhon Mein Pali"	Alka Yagnik, Kumar Sanu
"Aankhon Mein Pali"	Alka Yagnik
