= Balmaa =

1993 film by Lawrence D'Souza

- Poster
- Directed by: Lawrence D'Souza
- Written by: Talat Rekhi (also dialogues)
- Screenplay by: Talat Rekhi
- Story by: Talat Rekhi
- Produced by: Suresh K. Grover
- Starring: Avinash Wadhavan; Ayesha Jhulka
- Cinematography: Lawrence D'Souza
- Edited by: R. Rajendran
- Music by: Nadeem-Shravan
- Production company: Adlab Films Pvt. Lmt.
- Release date: 1 January 1993
- Running time: 174 minutes
- Country: India
- Language: Hindi

Balmaa is a 1993 Hindi-language film directed by Lawrence D'Souza. It stars Avinash Wadhavan, Ayesha Jhulka, Saeed Jaffrey, Anjana Mumtaz in pivotal roles. Balmaa is a not proper Hindi word, but in India people often use the word balma to describe the life partner; i.e. wife or better half.

== Cast ==
- Avinash Wadhavan as Vishal
- Ayesha Jhulka as Madhu
- Saeed Jaffrey as Madhu's Uncle
- Anjana Mumtaz as Vishal's Mother
- Shammi as Mrs. Pinto
- Ghanshyam Rohera
- Rakesh Hans

== Soundtrack ==
#	Song	Singer
1.	"Agar Zindagi Ho"	Asha Bhosle, Kumar Sanu
2.	"Mere Khayal Se Tum"	Asha Bhosle, Nitin Mukesh
3.	"Bansuriya Ab Yehi Pukare"	Asha Bhosle, Kumar Sanu
4.	"Mehndi Se Likh Gori"	Asha Bhosle
5.	"Ye Mausam Bhi Gaya"	Alka Yagnik, Kumar Sanu
6.	"Meri Saheliyon Mere Saath Aao"	Alka Yagnik

== Trivia ==
At the end of the movie Dil Ka Kya Kasoor, Seema, the young daughter of Arun and Meena, writes a poem that goes: "Agar Zindagi Ho Tere Sang Ho, Agar Maut Ho To Woh Ho Tujhse Pehle..."

This poem features in a song for the film Balmaa (1993) that was made one year later. Coincidentally, Lawrence D'Souza is the director for both Dil Ka Kya Kasoor (1992) and Balmaa (1993).
