= Avinash Wadhawan =

Indian film and television actor

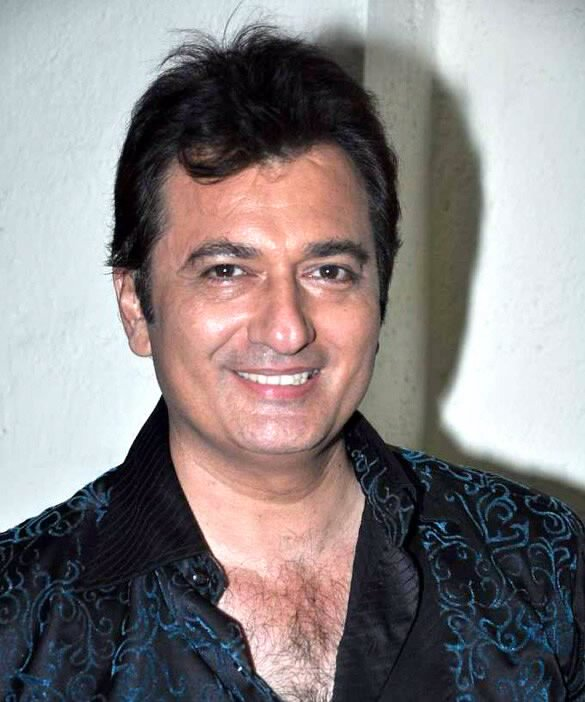
- Wadhawan in 2013
- Born: Rakesh Kumar Wadhawan; 2 November 1965 (age 60); New Delhi, India
- Education: B.E. (Civil Engineer)
- Years active: 1986–present
- Notable work: Ayee Milan Ki Raat; Sapna Babul Ka...Bidaai; Balika Vadhu
- Spouses: Chhaya Parekh (m. 1990; div. 2000); Natasha (m. 2003)
- Children: Samay Wadhawan (son) (born December 1992); Samrat Wadhawan (son) (born 2011)

Avinash Wadhawan is an Indian film and television actor. He has appeared in films like, Junoon, Geet and Balmaa.

== Filmography ==
=== Films ===
Year	Title	Role	Language	Notes
1986	Pyar Ho Gaya	Vishal Saxena	Hindi	
1987	Insaf Ki Pukar	Manohar	Hindi	
1990	Awaaz De Kahan Hai		Hindi	
1991	Ayee Milan Ki Raat	Suraj	Hindi	
1991	Rupaye Dus Karod	Vicky	Hindi	
1992	Meera Ka Mohan	Ravi Kumar	Hindi	
1992	Junoon	Ravi	Hindi	
1992	Geet	Rajesh Tripathi "Raja"	Hindi	
1992	Police Aur Mujrim	Rakesh	Hindi	
1992	Balmaa	Vishal	Hindi	
1993	Dil Ki Baazi	Ajay V. Kashyap	Hindi	
1993	Parwane	Avinash Malhotra	Hindi	
1993	Dhanwaan	Ajit	Hindi	
1993	Ghar Aaya Mera Pardesi	Birju	Hindi	
1994	Maha Shaktishaali		Hindi	
1994	Fauj		Hindi	
1994	Aaja Sanam		Hindi	
1995	Faraar		Hindi	
1995	Gunda Mawali		Hindi	
1996	Shohrat		Hindi	
1996	Papi Gudia	Inspector Vijay Saxena	Hindi	
1997	Chupp	Avinash Sikri	Hindi	
1996	Phool Bane Patthar	Raj Khanna	Hindi	
1999	Teriyan Mohabbatan		Punjabi	
1999	Bharata Ratna		Telugu	Dubbed in Hindi as Captain Bhawani
2000	Moti Ghar Ni Laaj		Gujarati	
2000	Khalsa Mero Roop Hai Khaas	Gurpreet	Punjabi	
2000	Dard Pardesaan Dey	Dharam 'Dharmiya' Singh	Punjabi	
2002	The Case Gormano Var Kesariyo	Malaria Max	English Gujarati	
2004	Wife Hai Toh Life Hai		Hindi	
2005	7 Aatankwadi		Hindi	
2007	Tu Meri Jindarhe		Punjabi	
2008	Wattanaan Ton Door	Dharam	Punjabi	
2010	Soohagan Bana De Sajana Hamaar		Bhojpuri	
2014	Mukka		Hindi	Original released in 1995. Later dubbed into Bhojpuri as "Dusman Ke Khoon Paani Ha"
2018	Mausam Ikrar Ke Do Pal Pyar Ke		Hindi	

=== Television ===
Year	Serial	Role	Notes
	Kuch Reh Jeewiyal Pall		
2003	Ehsaas		
2005	Detective Karan		7 episodes
2007–2010	Sapna Babul Ka... Bidaai	Indrajeet Rajvansh	
2009	Maat Pitaah Ke Charnon Mein Swarg	Kalishwar	
2011–2012	Shobha Somnath Ki	Patan Samrat Vallabhev	
2013	Junoon – Aisi Nafrat Toh Kaisa Ishq	Rajeev Khanna	
2004; 2006	C.I.D	Kishore/Gururaj/Yogesh Kumar	Episodes 111/412/423
2013–2014	Balika Vadhu	Anup Shekhar	
2015	Doli Armaano Ki	Aniruddh Sinha	
2017–2018	Piya Albela	Harish Vyas	
2021–2022	Aggar Tum Na Hote	Gajendra Pandey	
2023–2024	Teri Meri Doriyaann	Inderpal "Inder" Singh Brar	
2024–2025	Dil Ko Tumse Pyaar Hua	Omkaar Mittal	
2025	Manpasand Ki Shaadi	Kailashnath Dewan	

=== Web series ===
Year	Title	Role	Notes
2020	State of Siege: 26/11	JCP Sidana	
