= List of Hindi films of 1994 =

A list of films produced by the Bollywood film industry based in Mumbai in 1994.

== Highest-grossing films ==
The top films released in 1994 by worldwide gross are as follows:

Highest-grossing films of 1994
Rank	Title	Director	Distributor	Worldwide gross
1	Hum Aapke Hain Koun..!	Sooraj Barjatya	Rajshri Productions	128 crore
2	Mohra	Rajiv Rai	Trimurti Films Pvt. Ltd.	22.64 crore
3	Krantiveer	Mehul Kumar	Mehul Movies Pvt Ltd	15.85 crore
4	Vijaypath	Farouq Siddique	Time Magnetic Pvt. Ltd.	15.53 crore
5	Raja Babu	David Dhawan	Sapna Arts	15.26 crore
6	Laadla	Raj Kanwar	Neha Arts	13.91 crore
7	Main Khiladi Tu Anari	Sameer Malkan	United Seven Creations	13.84 crore
8	Dilwale	Harry Baweja	S.P. Creations	12.99 crore
9	Aatish	Sanjay Gupta	Sippy Films	12.26 crore
10	Suhaag	Kuku Kohli	Shweta International	12.14 crore

== 1994 A-Z ==
Title	Director	Cast	Genre
1942: A Love Story	Vidhu Vinod Chopra	Anil Kapoor, Manisha Koirala, Jackie Shroff, Anupam Kher, Pran, Danny Denzongpa	Romance, Social
Aa Gale Lag Jaa	Hamid Ali Khan	Jugal Hansraj, Urmila Matondkar, Ajit Khan, Ishrat Ali	Romance
Aag	K. Ravi Shankar	Shilpa Shetty, Govinda, Sonali Bendre	Romance
Aag Aandhi Aur Toofan	Kanti Shah	Mukesh Khanna, Kiran Kumar, Upasana Singh	
Aag Aur Chingari	Kanti Shah	Asrani, Shakti Kapoor, Ravi Kishan	
Aaja Re O Sajana			
Aaja Sanam			
Aao Pyaar Karen	Ravendra Peepat	Saif Ali Khan, Shilpa Shetty, Somy Ali	Drama, Romance
Aatish: Feel the Fire	Sanjay Gupta	Sanjay Dutt, Karisma Kapoor, Raveena Tandon	Action
Ab To Aaja Saajan Mere	Rakesh A. Nahata	Arvind Joshi, Shalini Kapoor, Roma Manik	Drama, Romance
Abhay	Annu Kapoor	Nana Patekar, Benjamin Gelani, Moon Moon Sen	Children's
Amaanat	Raj N. Sippy	Sanjay Dutt, Heera Rajagopal, Akshay Kumar	Action, Adventure
Andaz	David Dhawan	Anil Kapoor, Juhi Chawla, Raj Babbar, Mahesh Anand, Karisma Kapoor, Shakti Kapoor, Deven Bhojani, Dina Pathak	Action, Comedy, Crime, Drama
Andaz Apna Apna	Rajkumar Santoshi	Aamir Khan, Salman Khan, Raveena Tandon, Karishma Kapoor, Paresh Rawal, Shakti Kapoor, Viju Khote	Comedy
Anjaam	Rahul Rawail	Shah Rukh Khan, Madhuri Dixit, Deepak Tijori, Kiran Kumar	Drama, Thriller
Anokha Premyudh	Satya Gopal Bhatnagar	Arun Pandian, Aruna Irani, Shakti Kapoor	Comedy, Drama, Family, Romance
Anth	Sanjay Khanna	Sunil Shetty, Somy Ali	Action
Aranyaka	Apurba Kishore Bir	Mohan Gokhale, Sanjana Kapoor, Navni Parihar	Drama
Baali Umar Ko Salaam	Vasant R. Patel	Kamal Sadanah, Beena Banerjee, Tisca Chopra	Action, Comedy, Drama
Bandit Queen	Shekhar Kapur	Seema Biswas, Nirmal Pandey	Biography, Social
Beta Ho To Aisa	C.P. Dixit	Govinda, Raza Murad, Gulshan Grover, Varsha Usgaonkar, Asrani	Action
Betaaj Badshah	Iqbal Durrani	Raaj Kumar, Shatrughan Sinha, Jay Mehta	Romance, Action
Brahma	K. Subhash	Govinda, Madhoo, Ayesha Jhulka	
Chaand Kaa Tukdaa	Saawan Kumar	Sridevi, Salman Khan	Action, Comedy, Drama
Chauraha	Sadaqat Hussein	Jeetendra, Jackie Shroff, Jaya Prada	Action
Cheetah	Harmesh Malhotra	Mithun Chakraborty, Ashwini Bhave	Action
Chhoti Bahoo	M. M. Baig	Kader Khan, Deepak Tijori, Shilpa Shirodkar, Vikas Anand, Beena Banerjee, Bindu	Drama, Family
Deewana Sanam	Vicky Ranawat	Malaika Arora, Shekhar Suman, Rakesh Bedi	Romance, Thriller
Didi	Prakash Jha		
Dilwale	Harry Baweja	Ajay Devgn, Suniel Shetty, Paresh Rawal, Raveena Tandon	Romance
Do Fantoosh	Sikander Bharti, Veerendra	Amjad Khan, Shakti Kapoor, Sadashiv Amrapurkar, Vikas Anand, Ishita Babbar	Comedy
Drohkaal	Govind Nihalani	Om Puri, Naseeruddin Shah, Mita Vasisht	Crime Drama
Dulaara	Vimal Kumar	Govinda, Karishma Kapoor, Gulshan Grover	Thriller
Duniyaa Jhukti Hai		Sadashiv Amrapurkar, Jamuna, Anupam Kher	
Eena Meena Deeka	David Dhawan	Vinod Khanna, Rishi Kapoor, Juhi Chawla	Action, Crime, Comedy
Ekka Raja Rani	Afzal Ahmad	Vinod Khanna, Govinda, Ayesha Jhulka, Ashwini Bhave	Action
Elaan	Guddu Dhanoa	Akshay Kumar, Madhoo	Action
Fauj	Ashok Gaikwad	Kamal Sadanah, Farheen, Madhoo	
Ganga Aur Ranga	Joginder	Kiran Kumar, Joginder, Shakti Kapoor, Sahila Chadha, Suresh Chatwal, Anita Chopra	Action
Ghar Ki Izzat	Kalpataru	Jeetendra, Rishi Kapoor, Anita Raj	Comedy, Romance, Musical
Gopalaa	Akash Jain	Bindu, Suresh Chatwal, Prem Chopra	
Gopi Kishan	Mukesh Duggal	Sunil Shetty, Karisma Kapoor, Shilpa Shirodkar	Action, Comedy, Crime, Drama
Hanste Khelte	Bharat Rangachary	Nandini Singh, Rahul Roy, Aparajita	Comedy, Drama
Hum Aapke Hain Koun..!	Sooraj R. Barjatya	Madhuri Dixit, Salman Khan, Renuka Shahane, Reema Lagoo, Mohnish Bahl, Anupam Kher	Romance
Hum Hain Bemisaal	Deepak Bahry	Akshay Kumar, Sunil Shetty, Shilpa Shirodkar, Madhoo	Action Thriller
Ikke Pe Ikka	Raj Sippy	Akshay Kumar, Shantipriya, Prithvi	Action, Comedy
Imtihaan	Harry Baweja	Sunny Deol, Saif Ali Khan, Raveena Tandon	Action, Romance, Drama
Insaaf Apne Lahoo Se	Latif Khan	Shatrughan Sinha, Sanjay Dutt, Shekhar Suman	Action, Drama
Insaniyat	Tony Juneja	Amitabh Bachchan, Sunny Deol, Raveena Tandon, Chunky Pandey, Jaya Prada, Sonam, Anupam Kher, Prem Chopra, Alok Nath, Aftab Shivdasani, Vinod Mehra, Nutan	Action, Crime, Drama
Ishq Mein Jeena Ishq Mein Marna	Miraq Mirza	Divya Dutta, Brij Gopal, Shafi Inamdar	Romance
Jai Kishen	Sunil Agnihotri	Akshay Kumar, Ayesha Jhulka	Action, Drama
Jai Maa Karwa Chauth	Pradeep Pandit	Master Ankit, Banjara, Kishore Anand Bhanushali	Drama, Fantasy, History
Jai Maa Vaishno Devi	Shantilal Soni	Rakesh Bedi, Gajendra Chauhan, Arun Govil, Kiran Juneja	Mythology, Fantasy, Drama
Janam Se Pehle	B.R. Ishara	Raj Babbar, Farah Naaz, Sumeet Saigal	
Janta Ki Adalat	T.L.V. Prasad	Mithun Chakraborty, Sadashiv Amrapurkar, Madhoo, Asrani, Laxmikant Berde	Musical
Jazbaat	Anant Balani	Suchitra Krishnamoorthi, Rohit Roy, Reema Lagoo	Romance
Juaari	Jagdish A. Sharma	Dharmendra, Armaan Kohli, Shilpa Shirodkar	Family
Kabhi Haan Kabhi Naa	Kundan Shah	Shah Rukh Khan, Deepak Tijori, Naseeruddin Shah, Suchitra Krishnamoorthi	Romance
Kanoon	Sushma Shiromani	Ajay Devgn, Urmila Matondkar, Kiran Kumar, Gulshan Grover	Action
Karan	Shiv Kumar	Vindu Dara Singh, Prem Chopra, Trishna	
Khudai	Johnny Bakshi	Rajesh Khanna, Madhavi, Deepika Chikhalia	Drama
Khuddar	Iqbal Durrani	Govinda, Karishma Kapoor	Action
Kranti Kshetra	Raajiv Kumar	Mithun Chakraborty, Pooja Bhatt, Harish Kumar	Action
Krantiveer	Mehul Kumar	Nana Patekar, Dimple Kapadia, Atul Agnihotri, Mamta Kulkarni	Drama, Romance
Laadla	Raj Kanwar	Sridevi, Anil Kapoor, Raveena Tandon	Drama
Laqshya	Bhagwan Thakur	Tinnu Anand, Kiran Kumar, Sujit Kumar	
Madam X	Deepak Shivdasani	Rekha, Mohsin Khan, Shakti Kapoor	Action, Crime, Drama, Thriller
Madhosh	Vikram Bhatt	Dilip Dhawan, Anjali Jatthar, Faisal Khan	
Maha Shaktishaali	K. Pappu	Dharmendra, Ayesha Jhulka, Anupam Kher	
Main Khiladi Tu Anari	Sameer Malkan	Akshay Kumar, Saif Ali Khan, Shilpa Shetty, Raageshwari	Action, Comedy
Mammo	Shyam Benegal	Farida Jalal, Surekha Sikri, Amit Phalke	Drama
Mera Pyara Bharat	T. Rama Rao	Tisca Chopra, Puneet Issar, Sharad S. Kapoor	Action
Mohabbat Ki Arzoo	K.C. Bokadia	Rishi Kapoor, Zeba Bakhtiar, Rakesh Bedi, Ashwini Bhave	Action, Romance, Drama
Mohra	Rajiv Rai	Sunil Shetty, Naseeruddin Shah, Akshay Kumar, Raveena Tandon, Paresh Rawal	Action
Mr. Azaad	T. Ramarao	Anil Kapoor, Niki Aneja, Ishrat Ali	Action, Musical
Naaraaz	Mahesh Bhatt	Mithun Chakraborty, Pooja Bhatt, Sonali Bendre, Atul Agnihotri	Action, Crime, Drama
Paramaatma	Bapu	Mithun Chakraborty, Juhi Chawla, Amrish Puri	Action, Drama, Fantasy
Pathreela Raasta	Ajay Kashyap	Dimple Kapadia, Varsha Usgaonkar, Sadashiv Amrapurkar	Action
Pehla Pehla Pyar	Manmohan Singh	Rishi Kapoor, Tabu, Anupam Kher	Drama, Crime, Action, Comedy
Prem Shakti	Shibu Mitra	Govinda, Karisma Kapoor, Shakti Kapoor	Action, Drama, Fantasy, Romance
Prem Yog	Rajeev Kumar	Rishi Kapoor, Madhoo, Shammi Kapoor	Drama, Family
Professor Ki Padosan (delayed film)	Shantilal Soni	Sanjeev Kumar, Asha Parekh, Padmini Kolhapure	Drama
Pyar Ka Rog	Akashdeep	Ravi Behl, Bindu	Comedy, Romance
Raat Ke Gunaah		Archana Singh, Shekhar Suman	
Raja Babu	David Dhawan	Govinda, Karisma Kapoor, Shakti Kapoor, Kader Khan, Prem Chopra, Gulshan Grover	Comedy
Rakhwale	Sudharshan Lal	Dharmendra, Mithun Chakraborty	
Saajan Ka Ghar	Surendra Kumar Bohra	Rishi Kapoor, Juhi Chawla, Deepak Tijori	Drama, Family
Saboot Mangta Hain Kanoon	Suraj Prakash	Raj Babbar, Shashi Kapoor, Amjad Khan, Anita Raj	Action
Salaami	Shahrukh Sultan	Ayub Khan, Samyukta, Roshini Jaffery	Adventure
Sangdil Sanam	Shomu Mukerji	Salman Khan, Manisha Koirala	Action, Drama
Sar Kati Laash	Teerat Singh	Shakti Kapoor, Deepak Shirke, Sapna	Horror
Shabnam	Raman Kumar	Sanjay Mittra, Kaanchan, Alok Nath	Romance, Drama
Sholay Aur Toofan	N. Paryani	Kiran Kumar, Raaj Premi, Damini Priya	Action
Stuntman	Deepak Balraaj Vij	Jackie Shroff, Avtar Singh Ahluwalia, Tinnu Anand, Ami Asthana	Action, Drama, Romance
Suhaag	Kuku Kohli	Ajay Devgn, Akshay Kumar, Nagma, Karisma Kapoor	Action
Tarpan	K. Bikram Singh	Om Puri, Revathy, Dina Pathak	Drama
Teesra Kaun	Partho Ghosh	Mithun Chakraborty, Chunky Pandey, Somy Ali	Comedy, Drama, Thriller
Tejasvini	N. Chandra	Deepak Malhotra, Vijayshanti, Charan Raj	Action, Drama, Family
Thanedarni	Surinder Kapoor	Shikha Swaroop	
The Cloud Door	Mani Kaul	Anu Aggarwal, Murad Ali	Drama
The Gentleman	Mahesh Bhatt	Juhi Chawla, Chiranjeevi	Action
Triyacharitra	Basu Chatterjee	Om Puri, Rajeshwari Sachdev, Naseeruddin Shah	Drama
Two Brothers		Juhi Chawla	
Udhaar Ki Zindagi	K. V. Raju	Jeetendra, Moushumi Chatterjee, Kajol	Drama
Ulfat Ki Nayee Manzilen	K. Ravi Shankar	Agha, Ramesh Deo, Seema Deo	
Vaade Iraade	Kalpana Bhardwaj	Ayush Kumar, Mamta Kulkarni, Kulbhushan Kharbanda	Social
Vayu	Velu Viswanandhan		
Vijaypath	Farooq Siddique	Ajay Devgn, Tabu, Suresh Oberoi	Romance, Drama
Woh Chokri	Subhankar Ghosh	Pallavi Joshi, Neena Gupta	Drama
Yaar Gaddar	Umesh Mehra	Mithun Chakraborty, Saif Ali Khan, Shweta, Somy Ali	Action
Yeh Dillagi	Naresh Malhotra	Akshay Kumar, Saif Ali Khan, Kajol	Romance
Yuhi Kabhi	Kumar Bhatia	Anil Dhawan, Ashok Kumar, Tinnu Anand, Master Bhagwan, Kumar Bhatia	Comedy, Drama
Zaalim	Sikander Bharti	Akshay Kumar, Madhoo	Action
Zakhmi Dil	Raju Subramanian	Akshay Kumar, Ashwini Bhave, Ravi Kishan	Action, Romance
Zamane Se Kya Darna	Bobby Raj	Sanjay Dutt, Raveena Tandon, Alok Nath	Family
Zid	Esmayeel Shroff	Jay Mehta, Raageshwari, Mala Sinha	

== See also ==
List of Hindi films of 1995
