= List of Hindi films of 1995 =

- This article uses an abbreviation for "crore"; it should probably convert all numbers to western style (February 2021)

This is a list of films produced by the Bollywood film industry based in Mumbai in 1995.

== Top-grossing films ==
The top films released in 1995 by worldwide gross are as follows:

Highest-grossing films of 1995
Rank	Title	Distributor	Domestic collection (India)	Worldwide gross
1	Dilwale Dulhania Le Jayenge	Yash Raj Films	86.49 crore	103 crore
2	Karan Arjun	Digital Entertainment (DEI), Eros Entertainment, Rapid Eye Movies	42.06 crore	43.63 crore
3	Raja	Maruti International	33.58 crore	34.68 crore
4	Barsaat	Vijayta Films	32.43 crore	34.00 crore
5	Rangeela	Pathfinder Pictures	32.61 crore	33.44 crore
6	Coolie No. 1	Tips Industries Limited	20.96 crore	21.23 crore
7	Sabse Bada Khiladi	D.M.S. Films, Eros Entertainment	17.15 crore	17.38 crore
8	Trimurti	Mukhta Arts	14.24 crore	15.56 crore
9	Ram Jaane	Eagle Films	14.50 crore	15.19 crore
10	Akele Hum Akele Tum	United Seven Combines	11.71 crore	12.37 crore

== 1995 A–Z ==
Title	Director	Cast	Genre
Aatank Hi Aatank	Dilip Shankar	Rajinikanth, Aamir Khan, Juhi Chawla	Crime, romance
Aazmayish	Sachin Pilgaonkar	Rohit Kumar, Dharmendra, Anjali Jathar	Drama
Ab Insaf Hoga	Harish Shah	Rekha, Mithun Chakraborty, Sahila Chaddha	Action, drama
Ahankaar	Ashim S. Samanta	Mithun Chakraborty, Mamta Kulkarni, Mohnish Bahl, Prem Chopra	Drama
Akele Hum Akele Tum	Mansoor Khan	Aamir Khan, Manisha Koirala	Romance
Andolan	Aziz Sejawal	Govinda, Mamta Kulkarni, Sanjay Dutt	Comedy
Angrakshak	Ravi Raja Pinisetty	Sunny Deol, Pooja Bhatt, Kulbhushan Kharbanda	Action
Anokha Andaaz	Lawrence D'Souza	Manisha Koirala, Annu Kapoor, Govardhan Asrani	Romance, comedy
Baazi	Ashutosh Gowarikar	Aamir Khan, Mamta Kulkarni	Action
Barsaat	Rajkumar Santoshi	Bobby Deol, Twinkle Khanna	Romance
Bewafa Sanam	Gulshan Kumar	Krishna Kumar, Shilpa Shirodkar, Sagar	Drama
Coolie No. 1	David Dhawan	Govinda, Karishma Kapoor, Kader Khan, Shakti Kapoor	Comedy
Criminal	Mahesh Bhatt	Nagarjuna, Manisha Koirala, Ramya Krishna, Nassar, Gulshan Grover, Sharat Babu	Action thriller
Daughters of This Century	Tapan Sinha	Shabana Azmi, Jaya Bachchan, Madhuri Dixit, Nandita Das, Sulabha Deshpande	Drama
Dil Ka Doctor	Avtar Bhogal Singh	Mahmud Babai, Nimai Bali, Shabnam Chowdhary	Comedy
Dilbar	B. Krishna Rao	Mamta Kulkarni, Rishikesh Raj, Nawaz Khan	Drama, romance, family
Dilwale Dulhania Le Jayenge	Aditya Chopra	Shahrukh Khan, Kajol, Amrish Puri, Farida Jalal, Anupam Kher	Romance
Diya Aur Toofan	K. Bapaiah	Mithun Chakraborty, Madhoo, Suresh Oberoi, Mohnish Bahl, Kader Khan	Science fiction, crime, thriller
Droh Kaal	Govind Nihalani	Om Puri, Naseeruddin Shah, Mita Vasisht	Crime, drama
Fauji	Lawrence D'Souza	Dharmendra, Master Altaf, Raj Babbar, Suresh Chatwal	Action, crime, drama
Gaddaar	Deepak Sareen	Sunil Shetty, Harish Kumar, Sonali Bendre	Action, drama, romance, thriller
Gambler	Dayal Nihalani	Govinda, Shilpa Shetty, Aditya Pancholi, Gulshan Grover	Action
Gangster	Dev Anand	Mamta Kulkarni, Manu Gargi, Anita Ayoob	Action, drama, thriller
God and Gun	Esmayeel Shroff	Raaj Kumar, Jackie Shroff, Gautami	Action
Guddu	Prem Lalwani	Shah Rukh Khan, Manisha Koirala, Deepti Naval, Mukesh Khanna, Mehmood Ali	Drama
Gundaraj	Guddu Dhanoa	Ajay Devgn, Kajol	Drama
Guneghar	Vikram Bhatt	Mithun Chakraborty, Atul Agnihotri, Ishrat Ali, Pooja Bhatt	Action
Haqeeqat	Kuku Kohli	Ajay Devgn, Tabu, Aruna Irani	Drama
Hathkadi	T. Rama Rao	Shilpa Shetty, Govinda	Action
Hulchul	Anees Bazmee	Vinod Khanna, Ajay Devgn, Kajol, Amrish Puri	Drama
Hum Dono	Shafi Inamdar	Rishi Kapoor, Nana Patekar, Pooja Bhatt	Drama, musical, romance
Hum Sab Chor Hain	Ambrish Sangal	Vikas Anand, Aparajita, Dharmendra, Jeetendra, Kamal Sadanah, Ritu Shivpuri, Mohan Joshi, Puneet Issar, Girja Shankar, Gajendra Chouhan, Birbal	Musical
Jai Vikraanta	Sultan Ahmed	Sanjay Dutt, Zeba Bakhtiar	Action drama
Jallaad	T. L. V. Prasad	Vikas Anand, Sulabha Arya, Mithun Chakraborty	Drama, action, family, comedy
Janam Kundli	Tariq Shah	Jeetendra, Vinod Khanna, Reena Roy	Action drama
Jawab	Ajay Kashyap	Raaj Kumar, Harish Kumar, Karisma Kapoor, Prem Chopra, Mukesh Khanna	
Kalyug Ke Avtaar	Sham Ralhan	Jeetendra, Reena Roy, Madhoo	Action, romance
Karan Arjun	Rakesh Roshan	Salman Khan, Shah Rukh Khan, Kajol, Mamta Kulkarni, Raakhee Gulzar, Amrish Puri, Ranjeet	Action
Kartavya	Raj Kanwar	Sanjay Kapoor, Juhi Chawla	Action
Kismat	Harmesh Malhotra	Govinda, Mamta Kulkarni, Raakhee Gulzar	Action thriller
Maidan-E-Jung	K. C. Bokadia	Akshay Kumar, Karisma Kapoor	Action drama
Milan	Mahesh Bhatt	Jackie Shroff, Manisha Koirala, Paresh Rawal	Action, crime, romance
Naajayaz	Mahesh Bhatt	Naseeruddin Shah, Ajay Devgn, Juhi Chawla	Thriller
Naseem	Saeed Akhtar Mirza	Kaifi Azmi, Mayuri Kango, Kay Kay Menon	Drama
Nazar Ke Samne	Jagdish A. Sharma	Akshay Kumar, Farheen, Ekta Sohini	Family
Nishana	Raj N. Sippy	Mithun Chakraborty, Rekha, Paresh Rawal	Drama, family
Oh Darling! Yeh Hai India!	Ketan Mehta	Shah Rukh Khan, Deepa Sahi, Jaaved Jaffrey	Musical parody
Paandav	Raj N. Sippy	Akshay Kumar, Nandini, Prithvi	Action drama
Paappi Devataa	Harmesh Malhotra	Dharmendra, Jeetendra, Jaya Prada, Madhuri Dixit	Action
Param Vir Chakra	Major Ashok Kaul	Saeed Jaffrey, Kulbhushan Kharbanda, Hema Malini	War
Policewala Gunda	Pappu Verma	Dharmendra, Reena Roy, Mamta Kulkarni	Crime drama
Prem	Satish Kaushik	Sanjay Kapoor, Tabu, Deepak Tijori	Romance, drama
Raghuveer	K. Pappu	Sunil Shetty, Shilpa Shirodkar	
Raja	Indra Kumar	Sanjay Kapoor, Madhuri Dixit, Paresh Rawal, Mukesh Khanna, Dalip Tahil	Action drama
Ram Jaane	Rajiv Mehra	Shahrukh Khan, Juhi Chawla, Vivek Mushran, Gulshan Grover, Pankaj Kapur, Puneet Issar, Tinnu Anand, Deven Verma	Action drama
Ram Shastra	Sanjay Gupta	Jackie Shroff, Manisha Koirala, Dipti Bhatnagar	Action
Rangeela	Ram Gopal Varma	Aamir Khan, Urmila Matondkar, Jackie Shroff	Romance, comedy
Ravan Raaj: A True Story	T. Rama Rao	Aditya Pancholi, Mithun Chakraborty, Madhoo, Sheeba, Paresh Rawal	Crime drama
Sabse Bada Khiladi	Umesh Mehra	Akshay Kumar, Mamta Kulkarni, Mohnish Behhl, Gulshan Grover, Sadashiv Amrapurkar	Action, thriller
Sauda	Ramesh Modi	Sumeet Saigal, Neelam, Vikas Bhalla, Saeed Jaffrey, Dalip Tahil, Kiran Kumar	Drama
Surakshaa	Raju Mavani	Aditya Pancholi, Sunil Shetty, Saif Ali Khan, Monica Bedi, Divya Dutta, Sheeba	Action, comedy
Takkar	Bharat Rangachary	Naseeruddin Shah, Sunil Shetty, Sonali Kulkarni, Shafi Inamdar, Rakesh Bedi, Mohan Joshi	Romance, thriller
Veergati	K.K. Singh	Salman Khan, Atul Agnihotri, Divya Dutta	Action
Yaraana	David Dhawan	Rishi Kapoor, Madhuri Dixit, Raj Babbar, Kader Khan, Shakti Kapoor	Romance, thriller
Zakhmi Sipahi	T. L. V. Prasad	Mithun Chakraborty, Om Puri, Rituparna Sengupta	Drama
Zamaana Deewana	Ramesh Sippy	Jeetendra, Shatrughan Sinha, Shah Rukh Khan, Raveena Tandon	Action, comedy

== See also ==
- List of Hindi films of 1996
- List of Hindi films of 1994
