= Karan Arjun =

1995 Indian film by Rakesh Roshan

- Theatrical release poster
- Directed by: Rakesh Roshan
- Written by: Sachin Bhowmick; Ravi Kapoor; Anwar Khan
- Produced by: Rakesh Roshan
- Starring: Rakhee Gulzar; Salman Khan; Shah Rukh Khan; Amrish Puri; Kajol; Mamta Kulkarni
- Cinematography: Kaka Thakur
- Edited by: Sanjay Verma
- Music by: Rajesh Roshan
- Production company: Film Kraft
- Release date: 13 January 1995
- Running time: 175 minutes
- Country: India
- Language: Hindi
- Box office: ₹36.75 crore

Karan Arjun is a 1995 Indian Hindi-language fantasy action drama film directed and produced by Rakesh Roshan. The film stars Rakhee Gulzar, Salman Khan, Shah Rukh Khan, Amrish Puri, Kajol, and Mamta Kulkarni. The film follows two brothers who are murdered by their greedy uncle while seeking revenge for their father's death, only to reincarnate years later to seek revenge.

Karan Arjun was theatrically released on 13 January 1995 and received positive reviews from critics. It grossed ₹450 million ($20 million) at the box-office, emerging as the second highest-grossing Hindi film of 1995 after Dilwale Dulhania Le Jayenge (which also starred Shah Rukh Khan, Kajol and Puri). It was the 6th highest-grossing film of the decade.

At the 41st Filmfare Awards, Karan Arjun received 10 nominations, including Best Film, Best Director (Roshan), Best Actor (Salman Khan) and Best Supporting Actress (Raakhee), and won 2 awards – Best Editing and Best Action.

== Plot ==
In a village in Rajasthan, Durga Singh, a poor woman, raises her two beloved sons Karan and Arjun. When Munshiji, the servant of Thakur Sangram Singh, comes to speak with Durga, she reveals that her late husband was Thakur's son, who had married her against his father's wishes. Years earlier, Durjan Singh, a relative of Thakur, killed Durga's husband to prevent him and his family from inheriting Thakur's estate.

After learning that Thakur now plans to sign the estate over to Karan and Arjun, Durjan kills Thakur, before brutally murdering Karan and Arjun with the help of his brothers-in-law, Nahar and Shamsher. Grief-stricken, Durga prays to the Goddess Kali to bring her sons back. Miraculously, her prayers are answered; the two brothers are reincarnated into different families but grow up separated and unaware of their past lives. Though Durga is unaware of this miracle, she believes her sons will return one day.

20 years later, Arjun, reincarnated as Vijay, falls in love with the wealthy Sonia Saxena. Although Sonia loves him back, her wedding has already been fixed to Durjan's son Suraj. Meanwhile, Karan, reborn as Ajay, works for Govind, Sonia's father and Durjan's partner in his illegal arms trading business. Bindiya, a tomboy who is in love with Ajay, follows him everywhere. Upon discovering Sonia's love for Vijay, Suraj attempts to kill him, but Vijay fights back. Govind then sends Ajay to kill Vijay. As the brothers fight, a bolt of lightning strikes between them, interrupting the battle.

When Govind tries to shoot Vijay, Ajay stops him and shouts for Vijay to run. This triggers a memory, as Ajay unconciously repeats the exact words he said to Vijay during their past-life ambush. Consequently, Ajay is imprisoned, while Vijay escapes. Sonia is forcibly taken to Durjan's house to marry Suraj. Vijay and his friend Linghaiyya travel there to rescue Sonia, where the onlookers are stunned by his appearance and call him Arjun. Vijay finally remembers his past life and reunites with Durga, learning that his brother Karan is now Ajay. Vijay subsequently breaks Ajay out of prison and explains their past life.

Durjan hears of Karan and Arjun's rebirths but refuses to believe it. When Nahar and Shamsher attempt to capture the brothers, Ajay and Vijay kill them in the exact manner they were killed in their past lives. Karan and Arjun then terrify Durjan by convincing him of their resurrection. Govind seemingly relents and tells Sonia to run away with Vijay, but it is actually a trap.

Ajay successfully creates a distraction, allowing Vijay and Sonia escape from the trap. During the chaos, Vijay shoots Suraj dead, and a panicked Durjan kills Govind in a fit of rage. Durjan attempts to shoot the brothers, but they overpower and beat him. Although Durjan begs Durga for forgiveness, Ajay and Vijay exact revenge by killing him on her order. Later, Vijay marries Sonia, Ajay marries Bindiya, and the family is reunited.

== Cast ==
- Rakhee Gulzar as Durga Singh
- Salman Khan in a dual role as
  - Karan Singh, Durga's son
  - Ajay Singhania
- Shah Rukh Khan in a dual role as
  - Arjun Singh, Durga's son, Karan's brother
  - Vijay Sharma
- Amrish Puri as Thakur Durjan Singh
- Kajol as Sonia Saxena
- Mamta Kulkarni as Bindiya
- Ranjeet as Mr. Saxena
- Johnny Lever as Linghaiyya
- Feroz Khan as Nahar Singh
- Ashok Saraf as Munshiji
- Aasif Sheikh as Suraj Singh
- Suresh Chatwal as Girdhari Singhania, Ajay's father
- Jack Gaud as Shamsher Singh
- Dinesh Hingoo as Pestonji
- Raj Kishore as Jugal
- Ila Arun as a dancer in the song "Gup Chup"

== Production ==
Rakesh Roshan originally planned to cast Ajay Devgn and Shah Rukh Khan as the titular characters. However, both wanted to play different roles from the ones offered to them; Khan wanted to play Karan, while Devgn wanted to play Arjun. Roshan did not agree, and, as a result, both backed out of the film. Roshan then offered the lead roles of Aamir Khan and Salman Khan. While Salman agreed to do the film, Aamir declined. Shah Rukh then reapproached Roshan about returning to the project. Thus, the casting of the film brought together Salman Khan and Shah Rukh Khan for the first time onscreen, two prominent actors of that time.

Hrithik Roshan assisted his father during this film, having assisted him in his previous films.

== Box office ==
Karan Arjun was the second-highest-grossing Indian film of 1995, only surpassed by Dilwale Dulhania Le Jayenge, which also starred Shah Rukh Khan, Kajol and Amrish Puri. Worldwide, Karan Arjun grossed ₹450 million. Overseas, the film grossed $500,000 (₹15.8 million).

== Music ==
The music of the film was composed by Rajesh Roshan with lyrics penned by Indeevar. The music rights were originally bought by Time Magnetics (now Tips Music). The song "Bhangra Paale" was remade for the 2020 film Bhangra Paa Le.

Title	Singer(s)	Length
"Yeh Bandhan Toh"	Udit Narayan, Kumar Sanu & Alka Yagnik	05:40
"Yeh Bandhan Toh" (2)	Udit Narayan	01:38
"Bhangra Paale"	Mohammed Aziz, Sudesh Bhosle & Sadhana Sargam	07:07
"Ek Munda"	Lata Mangeshkar	07:38
"Jai Maa Kaali"	Kumar Sanu, Alka Yagnik & Amrish Puri	07:07
"Gup Chup Gup Chup"	Alka Yagnik & Ila Arun	06:02
"Jaati Hoon Main"	Kumar Sanu & Alka Yagnik	06:24

== Awards and nominations ==
=== 41st Filmfare Awards ===
Category	Recipient	Result
Best Editing	Sanjay Varma	Won
Best Action	Bhiku Varma	Won
Best Film	Rakesh Roshan	Nominated
Best Director	Rakesh Roshan	Nominated
Best Actor	Salman Khan	Nominated
Best Supporting Actress	Raakhee	Nominated
Best Music Director	Rajesh Roshan	Nominated
Best Comedian	Ashok Saraf	Nominated
Best Comedian	Johnny Lever	Nominated
Best Villain	Amrish Puri	Nominated

=== Screen Awards ===
Category	Recipient	Result
Best Actor	Salman Khan	Nominated
Best Music Director	Rajesh Roshan	Won
