= Ghanashyam Nayak =

Indian film and television actor (1944–2021)

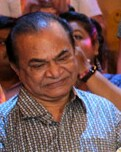
- Born: 12 May 1944; Undhai, Bombay Presidency, British India (present-day Gujarat, India)
- Died: 3 October 2021 (aged 77); Mumbai, Maharashtra, India
- Occupations: Actor, Artist
- Years active: 1952–2021
- Known for: Taarak Mehta Ka Ooltah Chashmah

Ghanashyam Nayak (12 May 1944 – 3 October 2021) was an Indian drama, film and television actor. He first achieved fame as a child artist, in the 1960 movie Masoom, and the song "Nani Teri Morni Ko Mor Le Gaye". His last memorable role was of Natwarlal Prabhashankar Undhaiwala a.k.a. "Nattu Kaka" in Taarak Mehta Ka Ooltah Chashmah.

== Early life ==
Nayak was born on 12 May 1944 in Undhai village in Mehsana district. He was son of Ranglal Nayak who was associated with Gujarati drama as a music director.

== Career ==
He started as a child artist in dramas and Hindi films and gradually worked towards comedic and serious roles. He also popularly cast in Bhavai roles. He played a Bhavai actor in Hum Dil De Chuke Sanam with Aishwarya Rai Bachchan. He had appeared in approximately 100 Gujarati and Hindi films and around 350 Hindi television series. He also acted in more than 100 Gujarati stage plays. He gave playback in more than 12 Gujarati films with maestros like Asha Bhosle & Mahendra Kapoor. He also dubbed more than 350 Gujarati films.

== Death and funeral ==
Speaking to ETimes, his son Vikas mentioned that the treatment of the cancer was tough since there was no set line of medicine considering it was a rare form of cancer. Even though the chemotherapy worked for some time and it seemed like it showed results, Nayak's health kept deteriorating and cancer spread to his entire body within one year.

Nayak died on 3 October 2021 from a rare form of cancer. He had wanted to die with makeup on.

Nayak's funeral was conducted the next day, on 4 October 2021. His last wish was fulfilled by Vikas who had a professional makeup artist do his father's makeup as he began his final journey towards his heavenly abode. In his latest interview with a news daily, Vikas opened up on how the family supported him and stayed with him throughout the difficult phase.

Gujarati film Tu Rajee Re (2022) starring Nayak was released posthumously.

== Filmography ==
=== Television ===
Year	Show	Role
1994	Shreeman Shreemati	Kishan
1994–1999	Philips Top 10	Makhkhan
1996	Aahat	
1999–2002	Ek Mahal Ho Sapno Ka	Mohan
2002–2004	Khichdi	Various characters
2004	Sarabhai vs Sarabhai	Vitthal Kaka
2004–2008	Saarrthi	Ghanu Kaka
2007	Dill Mill Gaye	Patient
2008–2021	Taarak Mehta Ka Ooltah Chashmah	Natwarlal Prabhashankar Undhaiwala a.k.a. Nattu Kaka
2012	Chhuta Chheda	

=== Films ===
Year	Film	Role
1960	Masoom	Child Artist
1974	Balak Dhruv	Ashram Shishya
1992	Beta	Hawaldar
1993	Tirangaa	Ram Lakhan Dr Gupta Servant
1993	Aankhen	Villager
1993	Aashik Awara	Police Constable
1994	Laadla	Gate Watchman
1994	Krantiveer	Kalyanji Bhai
1994	Eena Meena Deeka	Beggar
1995	Andolan	Professor
1995	Barsaat	Basti Man
1996	Mafia	Hawaldar
1996	Chaahat	Hospital Patient
1996	Krishna	Amar Prabhakar's Man
1996	Ghatak	Hospital Receptionist
1997	Ishq	Inspector
1998	Sham Ghansham	Heroine (Priya Gill)'s Father
1998	China Gate	Manager
1998	Barood	
1999	Kachche Dhaage	Inspector
1999	Hum Dil De Chuke Sanam	Viththal Kaka
2000	Tera Jadoo Chal Gayaa	Baniya
2000	Shikari	Ghanshyam (cook)
2001	Chehra Maut Ka	
2001	Lajja	Tiku (Promptor)
2003	Tere Naam	Chandu Chaiwala
2004	Khakee	Tailor
2004	Police Force: An Inside Story	Public Spectator
2007	Panga Na lo	Natakwala
2007	Undertrial	Nattu Jamuddia
2009	Dhoondte Reh Jaoge	Panditji
2010	Hello! Hum Lallan Bol Rahe Hain	Servant
2016	Ekko Badshah Rani	
2017	Love Ni Bhavai	Tea Seller
2019	Wig Boss	
2022	Tu Rajee Re (Gujarati)	Posthumous release
