= Beqabu =

1996 film by N. Chandra

- Directed by: N. Chandra
- Written by: N. Chandra
- Produced by: N. Chandra; Ramesh S. Taurani
- Starring: Sanjay Kapoor; Mamta Kulkarni
- Cinematography: Damodar Naidu
- Edited by: Prashanth Khedekar, Vinod Nayak
- Music by: Anu Malik
- Production companies: N. Chandra Productions, Tips Industries
- Distributed by: Disney India Studios
- Release date: 12 January 1996 (India)
- Country: India
- Language: Hindi

Beqabu is a 1996 Indian Hindi-language romantic thriller film produced and directed by N. Chandra, starring Sanjay Kapoor and Mamta Kulkarni.

== Synopsis ==
A terrorist gang is being trained in the forest area outside India, where a deal is being fixed with Zanjhar Singh to create chaos in India so that they succeed in deterring overseas investors from starting business ventures in India. Raja, who is imprisoned, is being taken to the court in a police jeep. On the way, he is shot by ACP Amritlal Bakshi and certain terrorists. Struck by a few bullets in the encounter, Raja dies. Reshmi's father plans to get her married. However, she prefers to stay home as the widow of Raja. In order to overcome the loneliness, Reshmi's father sends her to Nepal for a trip along with her friends. On reaching Kathmandu, she finds a lookalike of Raja. Though he tells that he is Ronnie, employed as a hotel singer over there, Reshmi has doubts, and she almost confirms that it is Raja. After a music play in the hotel, she asks him in front of the audience to display his left chest, where the bullet hit Raja during the encounter in which he was killed. Ronnie displays his left chest, and Reshmi feels embarrassed when she sees that there is no mark of any injury on his left chest. Unable to bear the humiliation in front of the crowd, she jumps from the top of the building and gets seriously injured.

The hotel owner becomes confused over the incident and inquires about it. Rony reveals his past. Along with his Ustaad and Behrupriya, Ronnie, alias Raja, cleverly loots a bank by fooling the manager. Just when they were about to take leave with the looted money, the terrorist gang led by Zanjhar attacks the bank. Much to his astonishment, Zanjhar finds that the bank manager is tied up in the locker and all the safes have been looted. Irritated on seeing this, Zanjhar fires at everyone in his way and asks for money. Raja throws the briefcase with money to Zanjhar, and they take leave. Highly dejected after their plan's failure, Daadu, Raja, and Behrupiya script a tale and cleverly get the money bag back from Zanjhar's colleague. Zanjhar is unhappy with this and they trace out Daadu's whereabouts and kill him. They follow Raja, and while he gets shot, a visitor, Dayal Verma, saves Raja and is admitted to the hospital. ACP Amritlal Bakshi visits Raja in the hospital and assures him of a safe residence if he assists the police in trapping Zanjhar. Dayal Verma secretly reveals to ACP that he is the biological father of Raja, and he had abandoned them long ago owing to a misunderstanding. Now he has realised the mistake and hence saved his son from gunpoint. He also informs that by his influence, he will somehow get a job for Raja at his master's house, where he is now employed as a driver, and also install cultural values in his son, which are desperately missing in him now.

In the meantime, Dayal Verma's master accidentally drove his car over a few people who were sleeping by the roadside at night. He is about to be caught by the police when Dayal insists that he will bear the crime on his head and go to jail. In return, they had to employ his son in their house, to which they agree. Raja and Behrupiya stay in the master's house. Reshmi, the master's daughter, falls in love with Raja. In the meantime, Raja helps the police to catch Zanjhar. However, things get worse as Reshmi's family is against the love affair. Raja elopes with Reshmi, and they secretly get married. However, terrorists find them, and Reshmi gets shot. She gets admitted to the hospital, and Raja comes to visit her when her mother stops him. However, when the nurse tells her to present Raja in front of her, Raja goes to see her despite the obstruction from Reshmi's mother and other hospital staff. Raja is then arrested and put in jail for creating an issue in the hospital.

In jail, ACP Amritlal Bakshi reveals a new plan to "kill" Raja to escape from the terrorists. For this, he wore a proof vest and put red colour patches and was shot with bullets on the way to court, and he fell down dead in front of the crowd. According to Zanjhar's men, Raja was killed on the way to the house. Then, Raja leaves for Nepal and disguises himself as Ronnie, the hotel singer.

Now, since Reshmi is again unconscious, Ronnie reveals himself as Raja. In the meantime, Zanjhar, who is in jail, identifies Dayal Verma in the same jail as Raja's father. Dayal Verma, who was to be released the next day, reveals to Zanjhar that after his release, he plans to stay with his son, who is alive in Nepal. That night, Zanjhar breaks the jail and escapes, taking Dayal along with him. ACP Amritlal Bakshi sets out to find Zanjhar and locates Zanjhar at Marfah village along with Raja. In the violent climax, Raja kills Zanjhar by burning him down.

== Cast ==
- Ashok Kumar as Daadu Raja's ustaad
- Sanjay Kapoor as Raja alias Ronnie Verma
- Mamta Kulkarni as Reshmi Kapoor
- Amrish Puri as ACP Amritlal Bakshi
- Pramod Moutho as Amrendra Kapoor
- Himani Shivpuri as Aarti Kapoor
- Mohan Kapoor as Zanjhar Singh
- Anjan Srivastav as Dayal Verma
- Dilip Prabhavalkar as Behrupiya Raja's Friend
- John Gabriel as Gadhulla Pathan Terrorist
- Brownie as Head Terrorist
- Neer Shah as Rana Shaheb
- Guddi Maruti as Rashmi's Friend
- Dinesh Hingoo as Bank Manager

== Soundtrack ==
Beqabu

Soundtrack album by Anu Malik
- Released: 1995
- Genre: Feature film soundtrack
- Label: Tips Music

#	Title	Singer(s)	Lyricist
1	"Beqabu Ho Gaya"	Udit Narayan, Alka Yagnik	Nida Fazli
2	"Tu Woh Tu Hai"	Udit Narayan, Alka Yagnik	Nida Fazli
3	"Chun Liya Maine Tujhe"	Udit Narayan, Alka Yagnik	Maya Govind
4	"Umra Teri Solah"	Abhijeet Bhattacharya	Sameer
5	"Yaariyan Yaariyan Jo Bhi Choor"	Udit Narayan, Alka Yagnik	Maya Govind
6	"Lenga Lenga Lenga" (Not in the film)	Remo Fernandes, Alisha Chinai	Sameer
7	"Dil Mera Chalte Chalte" (Not in the film)	Udit Narayan, Alka Yagnik	Maya Govind
8	"Beqabu Ho Gaya" (Instrumental)		
