= Tirangaa (film) =

1993 Indian action drama film by Mehul Kumar

- DVD Cover
- Directed by: Mehul Kumar
- Written by: K. K. Singh
- Produced by: Mehul Kumar
- Starring: Raaj Kumar; Nana Patekar; Harish Kumar; Mamta Kulkarni; Varsha Usgaonkar; Deepak Shirke; Manohar Singh
- Cinematography: Russi Billimoria
- Edited by: Yusuf Sheikh
- Music by: Laxmikant–Pyarelal
- Production company: M. K. Pictures
- Release date: 22 January 1993
- Running time: 168 minutes
- Country: India
- Language: Hindi
- Box office: ₹120.25 million

Tirangaa (transl. Tricolour) is a 1993 Indian action drama film directed by Mehul Kumar. It stars Raaj Kumar, Nana Patekar, Varsha Usgaonkar, Harish Kumar and Mamta Kulkarni. The film was a blockbuster. At the time of the 1993 Bombay bombings; Plaza cinema, Mumbai was also bombed where the film was being shown, leaving 10 dead and 37 injured.

== Plot ==
The film starts with the kidnapping of three nuclear scientists by Pralayanath Gundaswami as he plans to build nuclear missiles for an invasion of India. Meanwhile, Deputy Inspector General of Police Rudrapratap Chauhan, an honest police officer, is murdered by Pralayanath Gundaswami, as he is on his hitlist. Rudrapatap's son, Sanjay, is the only witness of his murder.While the scientists remain missing, police call Brigadier Suryadev Singh to take the matter into his own hands. Suryadev allies with honest but hot-headed Police Inspector Shivajirao Wagle, who has spent a lot of time on suspension due to his temper. When Central Minister Jeevanlal Tandel, who is an ally of Pralayanath Gundaswami, sets up a meeting with him to inform him about Suryadev Singh, Pralayanath Gundaswami questions why there is information about his glory and not a single photograph of his face. At that moment, Suryadev Singh enters the auditorium and reveals that he is the one whose face Pralayanath Gundaswami was so eager to see.

Meanwhile, on New Year's Eve, Sanjay and his friends find Radha Tandel in a very bad condition at the beach, as someone had tried to murder her. They rush her to hospital, but later flee when the staff call the police to inquire about the case. The police find a girl's dead body at the beach, then trace Sanjay by his wallet which fell at the beach on New Year's Eve and charge him with murder and attempted rape.

After knowing who Suryadev is, Pralayanath Gundaswami tries to kill him by planting a bomb in his car. However, Suryadev's car is a high tech vehicle, allowing him to escape with his driver and bodyguard Bahadur into a secret door within the car. As a result of the explosion, the news reports that he has been murdered.

After Suryadev escapes, he explains his survival to the news, and subsequently to Pralayanath through a TV interview. Pralayanath tries to kidnap Professor Khurana, but Suryadev and Waghle foil his attempt. Pralayanath then tries to kill Sanjay and his friends, but one of his friends sacrifices his life to save him on the eve of Raksha Bandhan. Pralayanath then tries to kidnap Professor Khurana again, but fails to do so. Instead, he takes the fuse conductor un order to activate his missiles. Waghle and Suryadev track him down through their transmitter. Suryadev foils Pralayanath's missile attack by taking out the fuse conductors, and guns him down. Waghle finishes off Pralayanath's son. The film ends with the 15 August programme concluding successfully.

== Cast ==
- Raaj Kumar as Brigadier Suryadev Singh
- Nana Patekar as Inspector Shivaji Rao Wagle
- Varsha Usgaonkar as Shanti Verma
- Harish as Sanjay Chauhan
- Mamta Kulkarni as Sandhya Gupta
- Deepak Shirke as Pralayanath Gundaswami
- Manohar Singh as Chief Minister Jeevanlal Tandel
- Arjun as Rasiknath Gundaswami
- Alok Nath as Home Minister
- Suresh Oberoi as DIG Rudrapratap Chauhan
- Satyen Kappu as Dr. Gupta
- Aparajita as Mrs. Gupta
- Anjana Mumtaz as Mrs. Chauhan
- Sujit Kumar as Police Commissioner
- Shehzad Khan as Inspector who arrests Sanjay Chauhan for rape of Radha Tandel
- K. K. Raj as DCP Patania
- Joginder as Inspector Satyawadi Dubey
- Mahavir Shah as Jailor
- Krishan Dhawan as Professor Rangaswamy
- Sudhir Dalvi as Professor Nazrul Hassan
- Mukesh Rawal as Professor Khurana
- Vikas Anand as Judge
- Kamaldeep as Judge Hariprasad
- Bob Christo as Bob
- Gavin Packard as Tom
- Daboo Malik as Alok Verma
- Girish Malik as Ali Khan
- Dharmesh Tiwari as Defence Lawyer of Sanjay, Alok and Ali
- Rakesh Bedi as Police Informer Khabarilal
- Pankaj Berry as Dr. Sinha
- Sonika Gill as Radha Tandel
- Mehul Kumar as Municipal Commissioner Tiwari
- Ghanashyam Nayak as Ram Lakhan
- Bandini Mishra as Anita Chaudhary
- Anil Yadav as Babban

== Songs ==
All lyrics are written by Santosh Anand.

1. "Pee Le Pee Le Oh More Raja, Pee Le Pee Le Oh More Jani" - Mohammed Aziz, Sudesh Bhosle
2. "Ise Samjho Na Resham Ka Taar" - Sadhana Sargam
3. "Oye Rabba Meri Jaan Bacha Le Phans Gayi Dil Ke Rog Me" - Kavita Krishnamurthy, Mohammed Aziz
4. "Yeh Aan Tirangaa Hai" - Mohammed Aziz
5. "Ise Samjho Na Resham Ka Taar" (Tragic) - Sadhana Sargam
6. "Yeh Aan Tirangaa Hai" (Version 2) - Mohammed Aziz
7. "Aaj Ki Shaam Pyar Karne Walon Ke Naam" - Mohammed Aziz, Kavita Krishnamurthy, Udit Narayan
8. "Jaane Mann Jaane Mann" - Sadhana Sargam, Mohammed Aziz

== In popular culture ==
Nawazuddin Siddiqui as Asghar Muqaddam refers to the movie for the incidence of planting explosives during interrogation in the film Black Friday.
