= Mera Dil Tere Liye =

- Poster
- Directed by: S. A. Chandrasekhar
- Written by: Miraq Mirza (dialogue)
- Story by: Shoba Chandrasekhar
- Produced by: Mrs. Shohreh Bhagat
- Starring: Neeraj; Mamta Kulkarni
- Cinematography: S. Jayachandran
- Edited by: Shyam Mukherjee
- Music by: Babul Bose; Score: Sangeet Raj
- Production companies: V. V. Creations; Crystal Films
- Distributed by: V. V. Creations
- Release date: 2 February 1992
- Country: India
- Language: Hindi

Mera Dil Tere Liye (Note: Spelt on the CBFC certificate as Mere Dil There Liye.) (transl. My heart is for you) is a 1992 Indian Hindi-language film, directed by S. A. Chandrasekhar and produced by Mrs. Shohreh Bhagat. The film stars Neeraj and Mamta Kulkarni with Gopi Bhalla, Dinesh, Shily Kapoor and Arun Verma in supporting roles. The film was a remake of the Tamil film Nanbargal.

== Cast ==
- Neeraj as Vijay Verma
- Mamta Kulkarni as Priya Singh
- Gopi Bhalla as Gopi Bhalla
- Dinesh as Peter Pereira
- Shily Kapoor as Bheema
- Arun Verma as Salim
- Kader Khan as Principal Sinha
- Raza Murad as Raghunath Singh
- Tiku Talsania as Phoolwa's husband
- Aruna Irani as Phoolwa
- Anjana Mumtaz as Savitri Singh
- Daman Maan as Vikram Singh
- Ajay Rathnam as Police Inspector

== Soundtrack ==
The music was composed by Babul Bose.

No.	Song	Singers	Lyrics	Length (m:ss)
1	"Mera Dil Tere Liye"	Anuradha Paudwal	Ravindra Rawal	06.30
2	"Ajab Sawari Gazab Sawaar"	Mohammad Aziz, Sukhwinder Singh, Sudesh Bhosle, Jolly Mukherjee	Ravindra Rawal	06.30
3	"Ishq Leta Hai Aashiquon Ke Imtihaan"	Anuradha Paudwal, Suresh Wadkar	Ravindra Rawal	06.34
4	"Mera Dil Tere Liye"	Anuradha Paudwal, Debashish Dasgupta	Ravindra Rawal	05.41
5	"Pyar Agar Zurm Hai"	Anuradha Paudwal, Udit Narayan	Ravindra Rawal	06.24
6	"Tere Gore Gore Gaal"	Anuradha Paudwal, Mohammad Aziz	Ravindra Rawal	06.05
7	"Tujhe Kasam Hai Laila Ki"	Anuradha Paudwal, Udit Narayan	Ravindra Rawal	05.52
