= Dilbar (film) =

- Film poster
- Directed by: B. Krishna Rao
- Written by: B. Krishna Rao; Achla Nagar
- Produced by: N. M. Ghori
- Starring: Rishikesh Raj; Mamta Kulkarni
- Music by: Laxmikant-Pyarelal
- Release date: 15 September 1995
- Country: India
- Language: Hindi

Dilbar is a 1995 Bollywood action film directed by B. Krishna Rao starring Rishikesh Raj, Mamta Kulkarni, Suresh Oberoi, Kulbhushan Kharbanda. It had music by Laxmikant–Pyarelal.This movie was the debut of Rishikesh Raj, the son of music director Laxmikant.

== Cast ==
- Rishikesh Raj as Ravi
- Mamta Kulkarni as Priya Verma
- Nawaz Khan as Vishal Chandrachur
- Suresh Oberoi as DCP Shridhar Atmaram Verma
- Kulbhushan Kharbanda as Mayor Ashok Chandrachur
- Johnny Lever as Araggam Tunga Pillai
- Laxmikant Berde as Tadipaar
- Beena Banerjee as Mrs. Goswami
- Reema Lagoo as Mrs. Chandrachur
- Aparajita as Kalavati
- Tanushree as Shalu Goswami

== Music ==
The music of has been composed by the composer duo Laxmikant–Pyarelal and all songs are written by Anand Bakshi.

Song	Singer
"Hum Tum Yun Milte Rahen To"	Kavita Krishnamurthy, Kumar Sanu
"Mere Dil Mein Lage Hai O Sanam"	Kavita Krishnamurthy, Kumar Sanu
"Padh Leti Hai Nazar"	Kumar Sanu
"Sabhi Ko Khuda Ki"	Kumar Sanu, Alka Yagnik
"Paon Mein Payal"	Alka Yagnik
"Main Athara Baras Ki"	Alka Yagnik, Udit Narayan
"Dilbar Dilbar Dilbar"	Alka Yagnik, Vinod Rathod
