= Hum Sab Ullu Hain =

Hum Sab Ullu Hain हम सब उल्लू हैं
- Directed by: T Manwani Anand; Tariq Bhat
- Written by: T Manwani Anand
- Screenplay by: Tariq Bhat
- Produced by: Sona T Manwani
- Cinematography: Satish Sista
- Edited by: Navneet Arjun; Ajay Gupta
- Production company: Sona Enterprises
- Distributed by: Sona Enterprises
- Release date: 11 September 2015
- Running time: 125 minutes
- Country: India
- Language: Hindi

Hum Sab Ullu Hain(Hindi: हम सब उल्लू हैं English: We all are owls) is a 2015 comedy film directed by T Manwani Anand and Tariq Bhat produced by Sona T Manwani under the Sona Enterprises banner. The film was released on 11 September 2015. The film marked Guddi Maruti's comeback to films after 5 years.

== Cast ==
- Upasana Singh
- Rakesh Bedi
- Rajesh Puri
- Gavie Chahal
- Guddi Maruti
- Vishnu Sharma
- Sunil Pal
- Dinesh Hingoo
