= Laadla (1994 film) =

1994 film by Raj Kanwar

- Release poster
- Directed by: Raj Kanwar
- Screenplay by: Anees Bazmee
- Based on: Anuraga Aralithu
- Produced by: Nitin Manmohan
- Starring: Sridevi; Anil Kapoor; Raveena Tandon
- Cinematography: Harmeet Singh
- Edited by: A. Muthu
- Music by: Anand–Milind
- Release date: 25 March 1994
- Country: India
- Language: Hindi
- Budget: ₹2.50 crore (equivalent to ₹18 crore or US$1.9 million in 2026)
- Box office: ₹17.43 crore (equivalent to ₹125 crore or US$13 million in 2026)

Laadla (transl. Beloved Son) is a 1994 Indian Hindi-language drama film directed by Raj Kanwar, based on a screenplay written by Anees Bazmee. The film stars Sridevi and Anil Kapoor while Raveena Tandon, Anupam Kher, Farida Jalal, Shakti Kapoor, Prem Chopra, Aruna Irani, Mohnish Bahl and Paresh Rawal play supporting roles.The film is the remake of Kannada film Anuraga Aralithu (1986).

The film initially starred Divya Bharti as the female lead, and she had shot most of the film. However, due to her sudden death in 1993, the film was reshot with Sridevi replacing her. In the film, a headstrong factory owner marries the union leader of her factory to quell his spirit and teach him a lesson. In the process, she ends up learning a few lessons herself.

Laadla was released theatrically on 25 March 1994 and became one of the highest-grossing films of the year. Sridevi's performance in a negative role as Sheetal Jaitley was widely acclaimed and earned her a nomination for the Filmfare Award for Best Actress, while Tandon's performance fetched her a Filmfare Award for Best Supporting Actress nomination.

== Plot ==
Raj "Raju" Verma lives with his disabled and paralyzed mother, Gayatri. Before a job interview, he saves textile mill owner Laxminarayan Jetley, who offers him a job in his factory run by his ambitious daughter, Sheetal. Her competitive attitude and open insults of staff earns her several enemies, including her henchman Tilak Bhandari, whom she often slaps and insults.

As a mechanic, Raju confronts her several times about the proper treatment of workers. She is enraged when he turns union leader. Raju falls for the mill's modest worker Kajal. Suryadev, a competing owner, tries to eliminate Sheetal. Charismatic, Raju guides her on how to handle rivals and workers. Egoistic and angered, Sheetal slaps him, who retaliates by reaching her cabin and slapping her back to back.

Sheetal cannot fire Raju, as then she would have to admit and give a proper reason. Vengeful, she convinces Gayatri to get her married to Raju. Reluctantly, on Gayatri's order, Raju sacrifices his love for Kajal and marries Sheetal. He lives in his own house and works as a mechanic but moves to Sheetal's luxurious house later, upon Gayatri's request. Slowly, he falls in love with Sheetal.

Kajal turns caretaker of Gayatri, which results in the betterment of Gayatri's health. Tensions arise when Sheetal eliminates Kajal, seeing Raju kissing her forehead. Later, labour issues cause the workers to go on strike. A competing mill owner, for personal benefit, hires people to set it on fire. Raju is mistakenly arrested, and Gayatri visits Sheetal's house to clarify the matter.

Insulted and taunted, she collapses, but Raju saves her and slaps Sheetal hard. Guilty, Sheetal, who now has feelings for Raju too, is kidnapped by Suryadev. Raju rescues her. Sheetal improves herself. Kajal turns managing director of her company, as Sheetal quits her job, and is also slapped.

== Cast ==
- Divya Bharti/Sridevi as Sheetal Verma Jetley : Raju's wife and Laxminarayan's daughter
- Anil Kapoor as Raj "Raju" Verma: Sheetal's husband and Gayatri's son
- Raveena Tandon as Kajal Bansal
- Farida Jalal as Gayatri Verma: Raju's mother
- Aruna Irani as Banobi
- Anupam Kher as Laxminarayan Jetley: Sheetal's father
- Prem Chopra as Suryadev Bajaj
- Paresh Rawal as Hiravat Bajaj
- Mohnish Behl as Vikram "Vicky" Bajaj
- Shakti Kapoor as Tilak Bhandari
- Alok Nath as Swaraaj Bansal
- Kalpana Iyer as Kamini Shastra
- Arun Bakshi as Mehtu
- Javed Khan Amrohi Loyal worker in the factory
- Ravi Baswani Loyal worker in the factory
- Lalit Tiwari as Advocate Devdas Shukla
- Vikram Gokhale as Doctor
- Vaishnavi Mahant in item song
- Ghanashyam Nayak as Gate Watchman

== Production ==
Divya Bharti was originally cast in the role of Sheetal and filmed most of her role, but due to her sudden death on 5 April 1993, she could not complete the film. Later, Sridevi was signed to play the role.

== Soundtrack ==
Producer Nitin Manmohan repeated music directors Anand–Milind and lyricist Sameer after hits like Baaghi, Maha Sangram, Adharm and Bol Radha Bol. The music topped the charts when released. It was among the best-selling albums of 1994.

No.	Title	Singer(s)	Length
1.	"Ladki Hai Kya"	Udit Narayan
2.	"Meri Dhadkan Suno"	Udit Narayan, Alka Yagnik
3.	"Rab Mujhe Bata De"	Udit Narayan
4.	"Teri Ungli Pakad Ke Chala"	Udit Narayan, Jyotsna Hardikar
5.	"Boi Boi"	Vinod Rathod, Arun Bakshi
6.	"Dhik Ta Na Na"	Udit Narayan, Poornima
7.	"Mere Ghulam Tera"	Alka Yagnik, Udit Narayan
8.	"Dhik Ta Na Na" (Female)	Poornima
9.	"Mere Ghulam Tera" (Female)	Alka Yagnik

== Awards and nominations ==
40th Filmfare Awards:

Nominated

- Best Actress – Sridevi
- Best Supporting Actress – Raveena Tandon
