= Nanbargal =

- Film poster
- Directed by: Shobha
- Written by: Shobha
- Produced by: Joseph Vijay
- Starring: Neeraj; Mamta Kulkarni
- Cinematography: S. Jayachandran
- Edited by: D. Shyam Mukherjee
- Music by: Songs: Babul Bose; Score: Sangeetha Rajan
- Production company: V. V. Creations
- Release date: 14 February 1991
- Running time: 140 minutes
- Country: India
- Language: Tamil

Nanbargal (transl. Friends) is a 1991 Indian Tamil-language romance film written and directed by Shobha Chandrasekhar in her directorial debut and produced by her son Joseph Vijay. It stars Neeraj and Mamta Kulkarni, with Vivek, Dinesh, G. M. Sundar and Shily Kapoor in supporting roles. Its songs were composed by Babul Bose, and the score was composed by Sangeetha Rajan. The film did well at the box-office and was remade in Hindi as Mera Dil Tere Liye by Shoba's husband S. A. Chandrasekhar.

== Plot ==
Vijay, Gopi, Salim, Beeda and Bheema are good friends and classmates. Priya, a rich and arrogant girl, has first quarrels with Vijay. Vijay first loved her, but she ridicules him and hurts him. When his friends try to teach a lesson to Priya, Vijay saves her and they fall in love. Priya's father, an influential businessman, is ready to break their relationship.

== Cast ==
- Neeraj as Vijay
- Mamta Kulkarni as Priya
- Vivek as Gopi
- Dinesh as Salim
- G. M. Sundar as Beeda
- Shily Kapoor as Bheema
- Nagesh as Rajasekhar
- Manorama
- Prathapachandran as Priya's father
- Sangeeta as Priya's mother
- Vennira Aadai Moorthy as Sidambaram (guest appearance)
- Ajay Rathnam as Police Inspector
- Kumarimuthu

== Production ==
Nanbargal marked the directorial debut of Shoba Chandrasekhar. The film was produced by her son Vijay.

== Soundtrack ==
The soundtrack was composed by Babul Bose, with lyrics written by Vairamuthu and Pulamaipithan.

Track listing
No.	Title	Singer(s)	Length
1.	"Achu Vellam Tharean Machinichiye"	Mano, K. S. Chithra	6:45
2.	"Atheri Paacha Pachadhan"	Mano, K. S. Chithra	6:23
3.	"Ennuyerea Ennuyerea" (Solo Version)	K. S. Chithra	5:57
4.	"Ennuyerea Ennuyerea" (Duet Version)	K. S. Chithra, Satheesh	6:51
5.	"Kaadhal En Paavam Endraal"	Mano, Shoba Chandrasekar	6:38
6.	"Kalangalaal Azhiyadhadhu"	Mano, Vijayramani, Satheesh, Prabhakar	5:53
7.	"Vellai Rojavea"	K. S. Chithra, Satheesh	6:25

== Release and reception ==
Nanbargal was released on 14 February 1991. N. Krishnaswamy of The Indian Express wrote, "The film has a swift pace, some interesting characters, a lot of fun whipped by the hero's sidekicks [...] and fastpaced music (new entrant Babu Bose), but what is film music these days but canned cacophony". C. R. K. of Kalki said the film's first half was sweet, but post-interval portions were bitter. After the film's success, a temple was built in Mamta Kulkarni's name.
