= Dinesh Hingoo =

Bollywood Actor (born 1940)

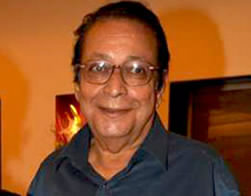
- Hingoo in 2011
- Born: Dinesh Hingorani; 13 April 1940 (age 86); Baroda, Baroda State, British India (present-day Vadodara, Gujarat, India)
- Occupation: Actor
- Years active: 1967-2015
- Spouse: Jamuna Hingoo

Dinesh Hingoo (born 13 April 1940) is an Indian former actor who played comic and supporting roles in Hindi films. He has appeared in over 300 films, from Taqdeer (1967) to Be Careful (2011), and is known for his laughter and impersonations including that of a Parsi businessman.

He was a stand-up comedian in many orchestras. Actor and comedian Johny Lever revealed in an interview that it was Hingoo, who gave him a break to perform on stage as a comedian.

He has played supporting roles and bit parts in movies such as Qurbani, Saajan, Baazigar, Humraaz, Daraar, No Entry, Judaai, Khoobsurat, Hera Pheri (2000 film), Phir Hera Pheri and Anubhav. He has acted in television serials on Indian public broadcaster, Doordarshan. He is known for his character as Chaman Jhinga in Hera Pheri.

== Filmography ==
| Year | Film | Role | Notes |
|---|---|---|---|
| 1967 | Taqdeer | | |
| 1973 | Jaise Ko Taisa | Prem | |
| 1974 | Kora Kagaz | Govind Gupta | |
| 1974 | Bidaai | Ramu | |
| 1974 | Gaal Gulabi Nain Sharabi | | |
| 1977 | Dhoop Chhaon | Totaram | |
| 1978 | Tumhare Liye | Anokhelal | |
| 1978 | Trishna | Bahadur | |
| 1979 | Khandaan | Ravi's friend | |
| 1979 | Naiya | | |
| 1980 | Agreement | Totaram | |
| 1980 | Hum Kadam | Parashuram | |
| 1980 | Jazbaat | Havaldar Ram Prasad | |
| 1980 | Qurbani | Parsi man | |
| 1980 | Aanchal | Driver/ Dance Master | |
| 1981 | Ladies Tailor | | |
| 1981 | Ek Hi Bhool | Broker, bringing customers for hotel | |
| 1981 | Itni Si Baat | Bansi | |
| 1981 | Poonam | Student of the college | |
| 1982 | Sun Sajna | | |
| 1982 | Johny I Love You | | |
| 1982 | Dil Aakhir Dil Hai | | |
| 1982 | Namak Halaal | Mr. Tombolo | |
| 1982 | Shriman Shrimati | | |
| 1983 | Kalka | Bharat kumar | |
| 1983 | Paanchwin Manzil | Liftman | |
| 1983 | Chor Police | Mr. Naorozi | |
| 1983 | Prem Tapasya | | |
| 1983 | Main Awara Hoon | Tahir Khan / Sahir Khan | |
| 1984 | Yeh Desh | Reporter | |
| 1984 | Sharaabi | Neighbour calling police in the song "De De Pyar De" | |
| 1984 | Rakta Bandhan | | |
| 1984 | Lakhon Ki Baat | Advocate Desai | |
| 1984 | Yaadgar | Rajnath's friend | |
| 1984 | Abodh | Wedding Photographer | |
| 1984 | Phulwari | Mohan | |
| 1984 | Naya Kadam | Chief Education Officer | |
| 1984 | Love Marriage | | |
| 1985 | Ulta Seedha | Doctor Malik | |
| 1985 | Wafadaar | Pandit | |
| 1985 | Hum Dono | Rustom | |
| 1985 | Hum Naujawan | Professor | |
| 1985 | Lover Boy | | |
| 1985 | Haqeeqat | | |
| 1985 | Meraa Ghar Mere Bachche | Mukadam | |
| 1985 | Ameer Aadmi Gharib Aadmi | | |
| 1985 | Karishma Kudrat Kaa | Kammobai's patron | |
| 1986 | Love 86 | Surendra Nath | |
| 1986 | Qatl | Wadia | |
| 1986 | Pyar Ho Gaya | Shambhu, Servant | |
| 1986 | Karamdaata | Bhagwan Das | |
| 1986 | Beti | | |
| 1986 | Anubhav | Drugstore keeper | |
| 1987 | Sansar | Pandit | |
| 1987 | Itihaas | Bihari | |
| 1987 | Daku Hasina | Munim | |
| 1987 | Muqaddar Ka Faisla | Swarnmukhi | |
| 1987 | Superman | Rus | |
| 1987 | Mera Yaar Mera Dushman | Secretary/ Assistant | |
| 1987 | Insaaf | Judge | |
| 1987 | Mera Karam Mera Dharam | | |
| 1987 | Sadak Chhap | | |
| 1987 | Khudgarz | | |
| 1987 | Imaandaar | Havaldar | |
| 1988 | Ghar Ghar Ki Kahaani | | |
| 1988 | Tezaab | Marvadi Seth | |
| 1988 | Ram-Avtar | Gangiya | |
| 1988 | Aurat Teri Yehi Kahani | | |
| 1989 | Sachai Ki Taqat | Marwadi Seth | |
| 1989 | Dav Pech | | |
| 1989 | Sachché Ká Bol-Bálá | | |
| 1989 | Suryaa: An Awakening | Bank Babu | |
| 1989 | Nafrat Ki Aandhi | | |
| 1989 | Jaisi Karni Waisi Bharnii | Jhokumal Makmal Pyarelal | |
| 1989 | Jung Baaz | Announcer at College Function | |
| 1989 | Paap Ka Ant | | |
| 1990 | Majboor | Defence lawyer/Bar owner's lawyer | |
| 1990 | Kishen Kanhaiya | Lokhandwala | |
| 1990 | Ghar Ho To Aisa | Munshi, Organizer of Charity Show | |
| 1990 | Dil | Pandu (Hazari Prasad's Servant) | |
| 1990 | Deewana Mujh Sa Nahin | Bholaram Bokade | |
| 1990 | Baaghi: A Rebel for Love | College Principal | |
| 1991 | Meet Mere Man Ke | | |
| 1991 | Paap Ki Aandhi | Grocer | |
| 1991 | Farishtay | | |
| 1991 | Patthar Ke Phool | Skating ground Owner | |
| 1991 | Karz Chukana Hai | Hasteyram Hingoo | |
| 1991 | Narasimha | Rat Poison Seller | |
| 1991 | Swarg Yahan Narak Yahan | | |
| 1991 | Pratikar | Corrupt Employer | |
| 1991 | Bhabhi | Parsi with five sons | |
| 1991 | Dancer | Pestonji Sohrabji Batliboy | |
| 1991 | Saajan | Mr. Laalchand / Verma's Business Partner | |
| 1992 | Jaan Se Pyaara | School Principal | |
| 1992 | Humlaa | Pinto, Hotel Employee | |
| 1992 | Jaagruti | | |
| 1992 | Police Officer | Police Constable Ram Singh | |
| 1992 | Honeymoon | | |
| 1992 | Zulm Ki Hukumat | Bahadur, Guest House Manager | |
| 1992 | Sapne Sajan Ke | | |
| 1992 | Deedar | | |
| 1992 | Khel | Hasmukh | |
| 1992 | Balwaan | Announcer at Death Well | |
| 1992 | Dil Hi To Hai | | |
| 1992 | Dushman Zamana | Shamsher Singh | |
| 1992 | Umar 55 Ki Dil Bachpan Ka | | |
| 1993 | Phool Aur Angaar | College Hindi Professor | |
| 1993 | Dil Ki Baazi | Taxi Driver | |
| 1993 | Sangraam | College Principal V.M.K. Shastri | |
| 1993 | Dhanwan | | |
| 1993 | Professor Ki Padosan | Director | |
| 1993 | Shatranj | | |
| 1993 | Zakhmo Ka Hisaab | Malhotra Director/Hotel Owner | |
| 1993 | Baazigar | Bajodia Seth | |
| 1993 | King Uncle | Chunilal | |
| 1993 | Divya Shakti | Rustom | |
| 1993 | Shreemaan Aashique | Anand (Army Man) | |
| 1993 | Anari | | |
| 1993 | Badi Behen | | |
| 1993 | Rang | Board member | |
| 1994 | Zid | Phukatlal | |
| 1994 | Aa Gale Lag Jaa | Police Constable Baakelal | |
| 1994 | Hanste Khelte | Bhonsle | |
| 1994 | Zamane Se Kya Darna | Chelaramani | |
| 1994 | Saajan Ka Ghar | | |
| 1994 | Pehla Pehla Pyar | Cook | |
| 1994 | Aatish: Feel the Fire | Aar Paar | |
| 1994 | Eena Meena Deeka | Baapji, Villager | |
| 1994 | Hum Aapke Hain Kaun | Manager Chacha | |
| 1994 | Aag | Muthu Krishnan Swamy | |
| 1994 | Gopi Kishan | | |
| 1995 | Karan Arjun | Pestonji | |
| 1995 | Aazmayish | | |
| 1995 | Janam Kundli | D.H. | |
| 1995 | Taqdeerwala | Editor | |
| 1995 | Anokha Andaaz | College Lecturer | |
| 1995 | Raja | | |
| 1995 | Coolie No. 1 | Announcer at Swayamvar Competition | |
| 1995 | Hulchul | Hotel Owner, Fan of Madhuri Dixit | |
| 1995 | Ahankaar | Vikram, monkey owner Rani | |
| 1995 | Sarhad: The Border of Crime | Francis | |
| 1995 | Akele Hum Akele Tum | Jamshed, Irani Hotel Owner | |
| 1996 | Vijeta | Politics | |
| 1996 | Papa Kehte Hai | Rustom | |
| 1996 | Shastra | Principal Badra | |
| 1996 | Saajan Chale Sasural | Travel Agent | |
| 1996 | Daraar | Maulana, Bus Passenger | |
| 1996 | Bhishma | Milavatram | |
| 1996 | Maahir | Constable | |
| 1996 | Dil Tera Diwana | Boys Hostel Warden | |
| 1996 | Beqabu | Bank Manager | |
| 1996 | Chhote Sarkar | Army Officer | |
| 1996 | Rakshak | Suman's Father | |
| 1996 | Namak | Munimji | |
| 1997 | Ghoonghat | Hotel/restaurant Owner | |
| 1997 | Police Station | Bajrangi | |
| 1997 | Judaai | Doctor (Special appearance) | |
| 1997 | Lahoo Ke Do Rang | Chandu Tolani | |
| 1997 | Mrityudaata | Maslani | |
| 1997 | Insaaf | Parsi Man | |
| 1997 | Gupt: The Hidden Truth | Thanawala Servant | |
| 1998 | Achanak | P.K.Sharma | |
| 1998 | Dulhe Raja | Diwani Seth | |
| 1999 | Anari No.1 | Jewellery Shop Owner | |
| 1999 | Rajaji | Karodimal Seth | |
| 1999 | Baadshah | Dr. Rustom | |
| 1999 | Hum Saath Saath Hain | | |
| 1999 | Khoobsurat | | |
| 2000 | Hera Pheri | Chaman Jhinga | |
| 2000 | Baaghi | Manuz, The Drunkard | |
| 2000 | Daku Ganga Jamuna | | |
| 2001 | Dil Ne Phir Yaad Kiya | Tridip Nandan, Photographer | |
| 2001 | Indian | Jewellery Shop Owner | |
| 2001 | Meri Adaalat | Magician | |
| 2002 | Kuch Tum Kaho Kuch Hum Kahein | Lawyer Shivprasad | |
| 2002 | Humraaz | Rustom Uncle | |
| 2002 | Hum Tumhare Hain Sanam | Lawyer | |
| 2003 | Ek Aur Ek Gyarah | Sethji | |
| 2004 | Ishq Hai Tumse | Jeweler | |
| 2004 | Fida | Real estate agent | |
| 2005 | No Entry | Doctor / Hotel employee | |
| 2006 | Phir Hera Pheri | Parsi House Owner | |
| 2010 | Most Wanted | | Marathi film |
| 2011 | Be Careful | | |
| 2015 | Hum Sab Ullu Hain | Sulemaan | |
| 2015 | Just Gammat | Builder Malekar | |
