= Aashik Awara =

- Theatrical release poster
- Directed by: Umesh Mehra
- Written by: Umesh Mehra
- Produced by: Parvesh C. Mehra
- Starring: Saif Ali Khan; Mamta Kulkarni; Mohnish Bahl; Sharmila Tagore; Saeed Jaffrey; Kader Khan
- Cinematography: Gangu Ramsay
- Music by: Laxmikant–Pyarelal
- Production company: Eagle Films
- Distributed by: Eagle Films & Weston Components
- Release date: 28 May 1993
- Running time: 154 minutes
- Country: India
- Language: Hindi

Aashik Awara is a 1993 Indian Hindi-language romantic drama film directed by Umesh Mehra. It stars débutante actor Saif Ali Khan and Mamta Kulkarni in pivotal roles. The film brought Khan and Kulkarni the Filmfare Award for best Filmfare Award for Best Male Debut and Filmfare Award for Lux New Face of the Year, respectively.

== Plot ==
Kedarnath is a wealthy businessman whose trusted associate, Kasturi Lal, secretly plots against him. Before an important trip, Kasturi Lal falsely claims there is a problem with their rental car and persuades Kedarnath to travel by taxi instead.

The taxi is driven by Dilip Singh, who is transporting Kedarnath, Kasturi Lal, and Ranvir. During the journey, a group of hired assailants ambushes the vehicle in an attempt to kill Kedarnath and Ranvir. Dilip Singh intervenes to protect them, sustaining fatal injuries in the process.

Grateful for Dilip Singh’s sacrifice, Kedarnath vows to care for his widow and young son. Kasturi Lal exploits this promise by conspiring with Deva Singh, an enemy of Dilip Singh’s family. Together, they arrange for Deva Singh’s wife, Sheela, and their son to impersonate Dilip Singh’s widow and child so they can receive Kedarnath’s wealth.

The real widow, Mrs. Singh, arrives at Kedarnath’s estate hoping to meet him but is turned away by Sheela, who drives her off while hurling abuses. On her way home, Sharmila encounters a beggar and his son and, despite her own hardship, gives them alms. Moments later, she is struck and killed by a car.

The beggar is revealed to be Jaggu, a petty thief who had been pretending to be destitute. Moved by Sharmila’s generosity, he adopts her orphaned son, Jimmy, and raises him as his own.

Years later, Jimmy grows up as a street-smart scammer. After stealing a shipment of gold from an underworld smuggler, he becomes the target of both criminals and the police. While fleeing, he steals the passport of an NRI businessman and assumes his identity. Traveling to Delhi under the man’s name, Jimmy inadvertently impersonates the fiancé of Kedarnath’s granddaughter, Jyoti, setting in motion a series of misunderstandings and romantic complications.

== Cast ==
- Saif Ali Khan as Jaidev "Jai" Singh/Jimmy/Rakesh Rajpal
- Mamta Kulkarni as Jyoti
- Mohnish Bahl as Vikram Mehra
- Navin Nischol as Dilip Singh, taxi driver (in a cameo).
- Sharmila Tagore as Mrs. Singh, Dilip's wife (in a cameo).
- Saeed Jaffrey as Kedarnath Tripathi, grandfather of Jyoti
- Pankaj Dheer as Ranvir Tripathi, father of Jyoti
- Rita Bhaduri as Gayatri Deshmukh Tripathi, mother ofJyoti
- Kader Khan as Jaggu, father of Tunnu
- Rakesh Bedi as Tunnu, son of Jaggu
- Sharat Saxena as Garga
- Satish Shah as Police Inspector Jagannath
- Amritpal as Deva Singh
- Archana Puran Singh as Sheela, mother of Vikram and wife of Deva Singh
- Ghanashyam Nayak as Police Constable, under Police Inspector Jagannath
- Viju Khote as Kasturi, Garga's right-hand man
- Malay Chakrabarty as Kasturi Lal, Sheela's brother
- Guddi Maruti as Batwoman in club
- Ravi Patwardhan as Judge at Court
- Vivek Vaswani as Real Rakesh Rajpal
- Amarnath Mukherjee as Minister Deshmukh
- Suhas Khandke as Defence lawyer of Ranvir

== Awards ==
39th Filmfare Awards:

Won

- Best Male Debut – Saif Ali Khan
- Best Female Debut – Mamta Kulkarni

== Soundtrack ==
Lyrics : Anand Bakshi

#	Title	Singer(s)
1	"Saat Suron Ke Sangam Se"	Alka Yagnik
2	"Maine Pyar Kar Liya"	Udit Narayan, Alka Yagnik
3	"Aaj Abhi Isi Waqt"	Udit Narayan, Alka Yagnik
4	"Main Hoon Aashiq"	Udit Narayan
5	"O Sanam Tere Aashik Hain Hum"	Udit Narayan
6	"Jai Jagdish Hare"	Vinod Rathod, Alka Yagnik
7	"Amar Mere Suhaag Rahe"	Sadhana Sargam
8	"Chand Aur Piya"	Sadhana Sargam
9	"Soorat Moorat Se Dhoka"	Vinod Rathod
10	"O Sanam Tere Aashik Hain Hum"	Kavita Krishnamurthy
