= Chhupa Rustam (2001 film) =

2001 film by Aziz Sejawal

- Directed by: Aziz Sejawal
- Written by: Aadesh K. Arjun (dialogues)
- Story by: Rajeev Kaul, Praful Parekh
- Produced by: Madan Mohla
- Starring: Sanjay Kapoor; Mamta Kulkarni; Manisha Koirala; Tinnu Anand; Raj Babbar; Dalip Tahil
- Cinematography: Kamlakar Rao
- Edited by: Waman Bhonsle
- Music by: Anand–Milind
- Production company: Seven Arts
- Release date: 23 March 2001
- Running time: 127 Minutes
- Country: India
- Language: Hindi
- Budget: ₹2.75 crore
- Box office: ₹10.63 crore

Chhupa Rustam: A Musical Thriller is a 2001 Indian Hindi romantic thriller movie directed by Aziz Sejawal, starring Sanjay Kapoor, Mamta Kulkarni, Manisha Koirala, Tinnu Anand, Raj Babbar and Dalip Tahil.

== Plot ==
Nirmal is an industrialist, and Raja is a small-time thief. Raja is in love with Nisha, and Nirmal is in love with Sandhya. Nirmal's father runs a tea plantation. When Nirmal's father is murdered, Bheem Thapa, the Commissioner of Police, notices the two men and plans to place the thief at the industrialist's house before selling Nirmal's father's property and stealing the money. Nirmal finds out his father was murdered and sets out to find the killer, who sets a trap for him. In the meantime, Raja takes his place. One of them is killed, and the other claims to be the industrialist. The mystery revolves around the identity of the survivor: either Raja or Nirmal. It is revealed Raja is dead; a fight ensues, and Nisha is killed. Nirmal continues his life happily.

== Cast ==
- Sanjay Kapoor as Nirmal Kumar Chinoy / Raja (dual role)
- Mamta Kulkarni as Sandhya, Nirmal's love interest.
- Manisha Koirala as Nisha, Raja's love interest.
- Tinnu Anand as Mama Manikchand
- Raj Babbar as Inspector Bheem Thapa
- Dalip Tahil as Baldev Diwan
- Neha Pendse as Guddi Chinoy
- Laxmikant Berde as Manik
- Navneet Nishan as Mrs.Chinoy, Nirmal's stepmother.
- Anant Mahadevan as Mr. Chinoy, Nirmal's father.
- Ram Sethi as Mukadam
- Avtar Gill as Driver Satpal
- Mushtaq Khan
- Vishwajeet Pradhan
- Viju Khote
- Satyen Kappu as Sandhya's father

== Soundtrack ==
Chhupa Rustam

Studio album by Anand Milind
- Released: 2000
- Recorded: 2000
- Length: 35:22
- Label: Saregama

Lyrics are written by Anand Bakshi, while the music is by Anand Milind. Most popular songs in album "O Bangla Gaadi Jhumke Kangana", "Yeh Chand Koi Deewana Hai", "Tu Nikla Chhupa Rustam" etc.

Track list
No.	Title	Lyrics	Artist(s)	Length
1.	"O Bangla Gaadi"	Anand Bakshi	Alka Yagnik
2.	"Tu Nikla Chhupa Rustam"	Anand Bakshi	Alka Yagnik
3.	"Yeh Chand Koi Deewana Hai"	Anand Bakshi	Alka Yagnik and Kumar Sanu
4.	"Raja Yeh Kya Karte Ho"	Anand Bakshi	Alka Yagnik and Kumar Sanu
5.	"Pyar Mein Dil To"	Anand Bakshi	Alka Yagnik and Kumar Sanu
6.	"Tu Hai Mere Dil Mein"	Anand Bakshi	Hariharan and Sadhana Sargam
Total length:				35:22

== Reception ==
The film was a box office success earning ₹ 10.63 crore.
