= Kabhie Tum Kabhie Hum =

2002 Indian Hindi film

Kabhie Tum Kabhie Hum is a 2002 Indian Hindi film. Directed by Roop Dutta Naik, it stars Mamta Kulkarni, Charuhas Shidore, Anjan Srivastav and Vijayendra Ghatge. The film marked the final on-screen appearance of Mamta Kulkarni, who subsequently left the entertainment industry.

== Plot ==
Dinanath Shastri is a retired bank manager. As he has never taken his family on a vacation, he decides to take them to Panchwati. He books the bank's guest house. During his last days at the bank he had turned down the loan application of Mr. Shrivastav, which did not go too well with the latter. On reaching the guest house, Dinanath Shastri finds out that the guest house is already let out to Mr. Shrivastav and his family. Apparently the caretaker was bribed by Mr. Shrivastav. Dinanath is enraged by this and decides to stay put and trouble Mr. Shrivastav.

Meanwhile, Mr. Shrivastav realises that Dinanath is the same manager who rejected his loan application.

The film revolves around the conflicts between the families in a comical way with romance in the backdrop.

== Cast ==
- Mamta Kulkarni as Sumona
- Anjan Srivastav as Dinanath Shastri
- Vijayendra Ghadge as Mr. Shrivastav
- Charuhas Shidore as Unknown
