= Krantiveer =

1994 Hindi film by Mehul Kumar

- Poster
- Directed by: Mehul Kumar
- Written by: K. K. Singh
- Produced by: Mehul Kumar
- Starring: Nana Patekar; Dimple Kapadia; Atul Agnihotri; Mamta Kulkarni; Danny Denzongpa; Paresh Rawal
- Cinematography: Russi Billimoria
- Edited by: Yusuf Sheikh
- Music by: Anand–Milind
- Production company: Mehul Movies Pvt Ltd
- Release date: 22 July 1994
- Running time: 148 min
- Country: India
- Language: Hindi
- Budget: ₹30 million
- Box office: ₹206.7 million

Krantiveer (transl. Brave Revolutionary) is a 1994 Indian Hindi-language action crime film directed and produced by Mehul Kumar. The film stars Nana Patekar, Dimple Kapadia, Atul Agnihotri, Mamta Kulkarni in the lead roles. Farida Jalal, Paresh Rawal, Tinu Anand, Danny Denzongpa are in supporting roles. It became the third highest-grossing film of the year, additionally winning three Star Screen Awards, four Filmfare Awards and one National Film Award.

The film was remade in Telugu as Punya Bhoomi Naa Desam (1995) and in Kannada as Parodi (2007). The sequel of Krantiveer was released as Krantiveer: The Revolution (2010). According to Box Office India, it was a blockbuster at the box office.

During the shooting of the film, Nana got ill and had to be admitted to hospital. The climax of the film was shot after he came back from hospital.

== Plot ==
Pratap Tilak is the grandson of Bheeshmanarayan Tilak, a freedom fighter. Pratap starts gambling and this leads to an attack on Bheeshmanarayan as he dies. Pratap's mother Durgadevi enraged by this, asks him to leave the village and go far away. Pratap comes to Mumbai where he saves the life of chawl owner, Laxminath's son Atul. Laxminath decides to keep Pratap with him. When they grow up, Atul falls in love with Mamta, who is the daughter of a builder named Yograj. Pratap keeps laughing at press reporter Megha Dixit, who lives in the chawl and keeps on fighting injustice by writing about it in newspapers. Pratap teaches people to become strong and fight for themselves instead of waiting for other people to help them. Chattursingh Chita and Yograj plan to build a resort and at the place, they arrange communal riots, mass killings, and burn the houses of people. Laxminath is murdered by Chita. Pratap learns that Megha's parents were murdered by Chita and she was raped by him. He proposes marriage to her. Mamta leaves her father's house and comes to Atul's house. Pratap kills the corrupt ministers, the judge, and the police officer. He is tried in court and sentenced to death. At the public hanging, he tells the onlookers that they are all cowards and he is willing to die, when a lawyer comes to the scene informing that Pratap has been pardoned by the President. Chita emerges to kill Pratap who picks a rifle and kills Chita with the bayonet.

== Cast ==
- Nana Patekar as Pratap Narayan Tilak
- Dimple Kapadia as Megha Dixit aka "Kalam Wali Bai"
- Atul Agnihotri as Atul
- Mamta Kulkarni as Mamta
- Farida Jalal as Pratap's Mother
- Paresh Rawal as Laxmidas Dayal
- Tinu Anand as Yograj
- Danny Denzongpa as Chatur Singh Chita
- Mushtaq Khan as Babbanrao Deshmukh
- Ishrat Ali as Chandrasen Azaad
- Vikas Anand as Judge Hukam Ali Javed
- Mahesh Anand as Vaishiram
- Ghanashyam Nayak as Kalyanji Bhai
- Janardhan Parab as Ismail
- Shafi Inamdar as Interviewer
- Mehul Kumar as Advocate
- Sujit Kumar as Police Commissioner
- K. K. Raj as Sub-Inspector Satyawadi Dubey
- Mulraj Rajda as Judge Vishwanath Singh
- Mukesh Rawal as Jailor
- Viju Khote as Dr. Vishwanath
- Bindu as Spl Appearance in Song Love Rap

== Critical reception ==
The Indian Express wrote that "Nana Patekar, who can lay claim to being the best actor in Bollywood, is the chief reason to see Krantiveer". The review further noted the "strong supporting cast", including Kapadia and Rawal.

== Awards ==
National Film Awards:

- Best Actor – Nana Patekar

40th Filmfare Awards:

Won

- Best Actor – Nana Patekar
- Best Supporting Actress – Dimple Kapadia
- Best Story – K. K. Singh
- Best Dialogue – K. K. Singh

Nominated

- Best Film – Mehul Kumar
- Best Director – Mehul Kumar
- Best Villain – Danny Denzongpa

Star Screen Awards:

- Best Actor – Nana Patekar
- Best Dialogue – K. K. Singh
- Best Story – K. K. Singh

== Music ==
Krantiveer

Soundtrack album by Anand–Milind
- Released: 19 June 1994 (India)
- Genre: Feature film soundtrack
- Label: Venus Records and Tapes
- Producer: Anand–Milind

Anand–Milind chronology
Eena Meena Deeka (1994)	Krantiveer (1994)	Suhaag (1994)

The soundtrack of the film contains 6 songs. The music is composed by Anand–Milind, with lyrics authored by Sameer.

#	Song	Singer
1.	"Jab Se Hum Tere"	Kumar Sanu, Alka Yagnik
2.	"Chunri Udi Sajan"	Kumar Sanu, Poornima
3.	"Love Rap"	Amit Kumar, Sapna Mukherjee, Sudesh Bhosle, Poornima
4.	"Phool Kali Phool Kali Chand Sitare"	Udit Narayan, Sadhana Sargam
5.	"Jhankaro Jhankaro"	Udit Narayan, Sapna Awasthi
6.	"Jai Ambe Jagdambe"	Praful Dave, Sapna Awasthi, Sudesh Bhosle
