= Ahankaar =

- DVD cover
- Directed by: Ashim Samanta
- Written by: Rajiv Kaul
- Screenplay by: Madan Joshi
- Produced by: Shakti Samanta
- Starring: Mithun Chakraborty; Mamta Kulkarni; Mohnish Bahl; Prem Chopra; Gulshan Grover
- Cinematography: Aloke Dasgupta
- Music by: Anu Malik
- Production company: Shakti Films
- Release date: 25 August 1995
- Running time: 155 min.
- Language: Hindi

Ahankaar is a 1995 Indian Hindi-language film directed by Ashim Samanta, starring Mithun Chakraborty, Mamta Kulkarni, Mohnish Bahl, Prem Chopra and Gulshan Grover

== Plot ==
The plot of the movie centers around Prabhat. Prabhat's love interest is Naina, a childhood friend. After an accident in which Prabhat saves his mother, he ends up with an inability to speak. A magnanimous factory owner offers him a job soon after, and Prabhat's work supports his family (half-brother, sister, and step-mother), both while his father is in and out of jail. After some time, Prabhat uncovers a plot against his employer and gets the criminal incarcerated, causing him to receive a promotion to manager. However, Prabhat nominates his half-brother, Surya, for the job. Prabhat is eventually ousted from the job. Surya is convinced by some gangsters to commit fraud, which Prabhat sets out to redress.

== Cast ==
- Mithun Chakraborty as Prabhat, Ganga's and Dwarga's adopted son, Surya's and Chanda's stepbrother, factory security, Naina's husband
- Mamta Kulkarni as Naina, Prabhat's wife
- Mohnish Bahl as Surya, Prabhat's stepbrother, brother Chanda's, Ganga and Dwarga's son, Anu husband
- Prem Chopra as Prem Chopra, Anu's father, factory manager
- Gulshan Grover as Jwala, Ganga's brother and Dwarga's brother-in-law, Prabhat's uncle
- Dinesh Hingoo as Vikram, monkey owner Rani
- Aruna Irani as Ganga Prasad, Dwarga Prasad's wife, Prabhat
- Daisy Irani as Naina's mom and Prabhat's mother-in-law
- Sunila Karambelkar as Anu Chopra, Prem Chopra's daughter, Prabhat and Chanda's sister-in-law, Ganga and Dwarga's daughter-in-law, Surya's wife
- Tiku Talsania as Naina's dad and Prabhat's father-in-law
- Ajit Vachani as Dwarga Prasad, Ganga's husband, Prabhat
- Pinky Chinoy as Chanda, Prabhat's stepsister, Surya's sister, Ganga and Dwarga's daughter
- Madan Joshi as Ajan director of the factory

== Soundtrack ==
Music is composed by Anu Malik, and the lyrics were written by Anand Bakshi.

#	Title	Singer(s)
1	"Tere Andar Meri Jaan"	Udit Narayan, Alka Yagnik
2	"Rama Rama"	Poornima
3	"Oh Bamba Oh"	Kumar Sanu, Sadhana Sargam
4	"Nasha Nasha"	Sunita Rao
5	"Mummy Ne Poocha"	Sadhna Sargam
6	"Pyar Iska Naam Hai"	Sadhana Sargam, Abhijeet
