= Baazi (1995 film) =

- Movie Poster
- Directed by: Ashutosh Gowariker
- Written by: Ashutosh Gowariker; Neeraj Vora; Naushil Mehta; Santosh Saroj (dialogues)
- Produced by: Salim Akhtar
- Starring: Aamir Khan; Mamta Kulkarni; Paresh Rawal; Mukesh Rishi
- Cinematography: Teja
- Edited by: Javed Sayyed
- Music by: Songs: Anu Malik; Background Score: Aadesh Shrivastava
- Production company: Aftab Pictures
- Release date: 14 April 1995
- Running time: 180 minutes
- Country: India
- Language: Hindi
- Budget: ₹32.50 million
- Box office: est. ₹88 million

Baazi (lit. Gamble) is a 1995 Indian action thriller film directed by Ashutosh Gowarikar and starring Aamir Khan and Mamta Kulkarni.

== Plot ==
The story opens with a group of people travelling in a bus. The bus is stopped on its way and a bunch of hooligans board the bus and create a nuisance when a man tricks them into getting off the bus. Later, the bus stops for a tea break and the hooligans arrive at the same time, when suddenly a passing convoy is attacked and the assassins try to kill the man inside one of the cars. The man, using his swiftness, foils the attack and manages to nab and arrest one of the attackers while killing a few others. Two of the gang members manage to escape the hotel.

This man is Inspector Amar Damjee Rathod (Aamir Khan) and the person in the car turns out to be Chief Minister Vishwasrao Chowdhury (Raza Murad), who was impressed with Amar and delegates to him the task of locating the people behind a multi-crore rupee international scandal to Amar. Amar promises to fulfill the job to the best of his ability.

It is shown that Chaubey (Paresh Rawal) was the one who committed the fraud and is trying to ensure that he is not caught, and hence he had asked the assassins to attack the CM. Amar tries to break the back of crime and this starts irritating Chaubey, who senses how close Amar is getting. Chaubey then frames Amar for the murder of the daughter of the Police Commissioner Mazumdar (Kulbhushan Kharbanda).

Amar, after a long fight with the head assassin Raghu, escapes prison along with several others. He then plots a scheme to go undercover as a woman to find the man behind all of this. He finds Chaubey and recognizes him as the man who killed both his parents. Eventually, Chaubey's assassins take everyone hostage in a 12-story tower in attempt to attack the CM once again, but Amar slowly but surely gets rid them all. As Chaubey tries to escape the scene via a helicopter on the terrace, Amar prevents him and eventually knocks him into a satellite dish, electrocuting Chaubey to death. Amar is congratulated by the CM and the Police Commissioner.

== Cast ==
- Aamir Khan as Inspector Amar Damjee Rathore / Miss Julie Braganza
- Mamta Kulkarni as Sanjana Roy, journalist and Amar's love interest.
- Paresh Rawal as Deputy Chief Minister of Maharashtra Deputy CM Chaturvedi alias Chaubey
- Ashish Vidyarthi as Shiva
- Mukesh Rishi as Raghu
- Avtar Gill as Sub Inspector Deshpande
- Mushtaq Khan as Sub Inspector Jamdare
- Kulbhushan Kharbanda as Commissioner of the Greater Mumbai Police Commissioner Mazumdar
- Haidar Ali as Inspector Damjee Kunwar Singh Rathore, Amar's father.
- Aparajita as Shanti Rathore, Amar's mother
- Raza Murad as Chief Minister of Maharashtra Chief Minister Vishwasrao Chowdhury
- Satish Shah as Editor Roy
- Jaya Mathur as Anjali
- Asrani as Hiranandani
- Daya Shankar Pandey as Small Thief
- Dinesh Anand as Deputy Chief Minister Chaturvedi's Nephew.
- Kunickaa Sadanand as Shiva's girlfriend

== Soundtrack ==
The music of the film was composed by Anu Malik. The lyrics were written by Majrooh Sultanpuri and Anwar Sagar.

#	Title	Singer(s)
1	"Dheere Dheere Aap Mere"	Udit Narayan, Sadhana Sargam
2	"Jaane Mujhe Kya Hua"	Udit Narayan, Sadhana Sargam
3	"Na Jaane Kya Ho Gaya"	Udit Narayan, Sadhana Sargam
4	"Dole Dole Dil Dole"	Kavita Krishnamurthy
5	"Dhadkata Hai Mera Dil"	Udit Narayan, Kavita Krishnamurthy
6	"Maine Kaha Mohataram"	Udit Narayan, Sadhana Sargam

== Reception ==
=== Box office ===
The film grossed ₹88.05 million at box office.

=== Reviews ===
It received mixed reviews from critics, with an India Today reviewer at its release calling it "an ambitious collage of foreign films - Die Hard, Point Break, Rambo - that just doesn't work." Film director Satyajit Bhatkal, after calling it a "Die Hard remake", stated that "the masala created massive indigestion both critically and commercially."
