= Betaaj Badshah =

- Release poster
- Directed by: Iqbal Durrani
- Written by: Iqbal Durrani
- Produced by: Vijay Mehta
- Starring: Raaj Kumar; Shatrughan Sinha; Mamta Kulkarni; Prem Chopra
- Edited by: Afaque Husain
- Music by: Anand–Milind
- Release date: 8 April 1994
- Country: India
- Language: Hindi

Betaaj Badshah is a 1994 Indian romantic action film directed by Iqbal Durrani. The film stars Raaj Kumar, Shatrughan Sinha, Mamta Kulkarni, Jay Mehta and Prem Chopra.

== Plot ==
Raja Prithviraj and his daughter, Tejeshwani live a lavish rich life. Raja is also a well respected, royalty and dangerous person when it comes to bad guys. She falls in love with Arjun Balwant Rai, son of Balwant Rai, who had kidnapped Tejeswhani as a child from his enemy Parshuram for vengeance who in turn was rescued by Raja. Parshuram too is a royal and a don similar to Raja and considers him his peer and rival. Daaga, assistant of Parshuram, however is the true villain and his son is also in love with Tejeshwani. Raja opposes the marriage of Tejeshwani with either Dagga's son citing his criminal background when proposed by Parshuram as peace treaty or with Arjun on account of his poverty. In the end, he kills himself seeing that his ego is the obstacle in his adopted daughter's life after Parshuram realizes that Tejeshwani is his own sister and he accepts Arjun as atonement for his crime committed to Balwant Rai.

== Characters ==
- Raaj Kumar as Raja Prithviraj
- Shatrughan Sinha as Parshuram / Prashanth
- Mamta Kulkarni as Tejeshwani / Guddiya
- Jay Mehta as Arjun Balwant Rai
- Mukesh Khanna as Balwant Rai
- Prem Chopra as Daaga
- Saddam Duale as Saddu Baba
- Rakesh Bedi as Bachchu Lahiri (dance instructor)
- Ajit Khan as Khan Chacha
- Mahesh Anand as Rama Swamy
- Neelam Mehra as Mrs. Daaga

== Soundtrack ==
#	Title	Singer(s)
1	"Choodiyan Bajaoongi"	Poornima
2	"Ek Chadar Do Sonewale"	Kumar Sanu, Poornima
3	"Hansi Hansi Mein Kabhi Dil"	Kumar Sanu
4	"Kabhi Mushkil Mein Hai Dil"	S. P. Balasubrahmanyam, Sadhana Sargam
5	"Khamosh Hai Yeh Lab"	S. P. Balasubrahmanyam
6	"Koi Aashique To Koi Deewana"	Sudesh Bhosle, Kavita Krishnamurthy
7	"Maine Tujhe Dil Diya"	Udit Narayan, Sarika Kapoor
8	"Pyar Aankhon Ka Darpan"	S. P. Balasubrahmanyam, Sadhana Sargam
9	"Pyar To Ek Imtihan Hai"	S. P. Balasubrahmanyam
