= Screen Award for Best Actor =

Indian magazine film award

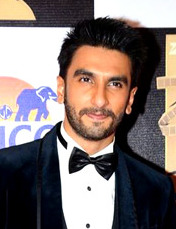
- The 2026 recipient: Ranveer Singh
- Awarded for: Best Performance by an Actor in a Leading Role
- Country: India
- Presented by: Screen
- First award: Nana Patekar, Krantiveer (1995)
- Currently held by: Ranveer Singh for Dhurandhar

== Multiple wins ==
Wins	Recipient
4	Shah Rukh Khan, Hrithik Roshan, Ranveer Singh, Amitabh Bachchan
2	Ajay Devgan, Ranbir Kapoor, Irrfan Khan

== Winners ==
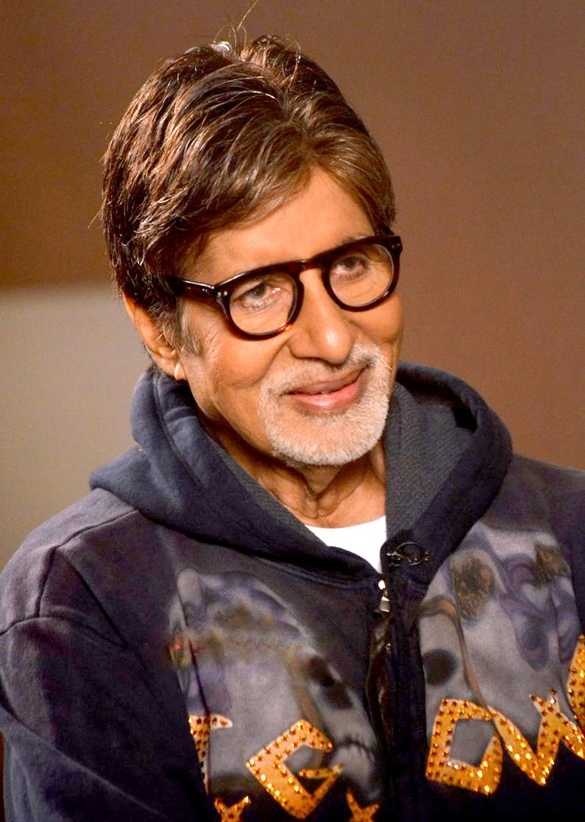
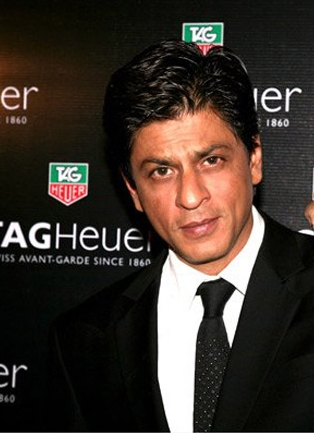
Amitabh Bachchan (left), Shah Rukh Khan (middle), Hrithik Roshan (right) hold the record of maximum wins in this category four times.

Year	Actor	Film	Role
1995	Nana Patekar	Krantiveer	Pratap Narayan Tilak
1996	Shah Rukh Khan	Dilwale Dulhania Le Jayenge	Raj Malhotra
1997	Aamir Khan	Raja Hindustani	Raja Hindustani
1998	Anil Kapoor	Virasat	Shakti Thakur
1999	Ajay Devgan	Zakhm	Ajay R. Desai
2000	Sanjay Dutt	Vaastav	Raghunath Namdev Shivalkar
2001	Hrithik Roshan	Kaho Naa... Pyaar Hai	Rohit/Raj Chopra
2002	Sunny Deol	Gadar: Ek Prem Katha	Tara Singh
2003	• Ajay Devgan • Shah Rukh Khan	• Company • Devdas	• Malik • Devdas Mukherjee
2004	Hrithik Roshan	Koi... Mil Gaya	Rohit Mehra
2005	Shah Rukh Khan	Veer-Zaara	Veer Pratap Singh
2006	Amitabh Bachchan	Black	Debraj Sahai
2007	Hrithik Roshan	Krrish	Krishna Mehra/Rohit Mehra
2008	Shah Rukh Khan	Chak De India	Kabir Khan
2009	Hrithik Roshan	Jodhaa Akbar	Akbar
2010	Amitabh Bachchan	Paa	Auro Arte
2011	Salman Khan	Dabangg	Chulbul Pandey
2012	Ranbir Kapoor	Rockstar	Janardhan Jakhar
2013	• Irrfan Khan • Ranbir Kapoor	• Paan Singh Tomar • Barfi!	• Paan Singh Tomar • Murphy "Barfi" Johnson
2014	Farhan Akhtar	Bhaag Milkha Bhaag	Milkha Singh
2015	Shahid Kapoor	Haider	Haider Meer
2016	• Amitabh Bachchan • Ranveer Singh	• Piku • Bajirao Mastani	• Bhashkor Banerjee • Bajirao
2017	Amitabh Bachchan	Pink	Deepak Sehgal
2018	Irrfan Khan	Hindi Medium	Raj Batra
2019	• Rajkummar Rao • Ranveer Singh	• Stree • Padmaavat	• Vicky • Alauddin Khalji
2020	Ranveer Singh	Gully Boy	Murad Ahmed
2026	Ranveer Singh	Dhurandhar	Hamza Ali Mazari/Jaskirat Singh Rangi

== See also ==
- Bollywood
- Cinema of India
- Screen Awards
