= Guddi Maruti =

Indian film and television actress

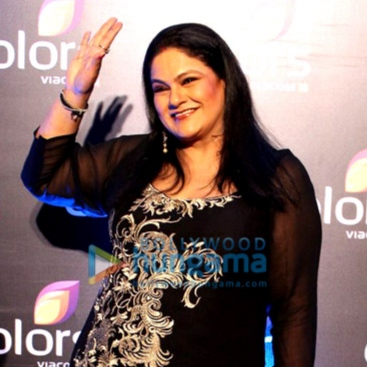
- Guddi Maruti
- Born: Tahira Parab; 4 April 1961 (age 65)
- Occupation: Actor
- Years active: 1980–present
- Father: Marutirao Parab

Guddi Maruti is an Indian actress best known for her comedy roles on TV and in Bollywood movies.

== Early life ==
Maruti was born to an actor-director father Marutirao Parab in Bandra, Mumbai. Her name is Tahira Parab and she was nicknamed Guddi by Manmohan Desai, which she uses as her the screen name.

== Career ==
Maruti started her career at the age of 10 years as a child artist in the film Jaan Haazir Hain. After her father's death, she continued acting to support the family. Due to her physical appearance, she bagged comedy roles in films and kept on going with her career.

Maruti has acted in over 97 movies since the 1980s. Over the years, she acted in TV shows and is well known for her role as Bua in the TV show Doli Armano Ki. Her popular movies include Khiladi, Shola Aur Shabnam, Aashik Aawara, Dulhe Raja and Biwi No. 1. She did not take chances to get to mainstream acting to avoid risks of being unsuccessful.

In 1995, Maruti and Vrajesh Hirjee did a stand up comedy show, Sorry Meri Lorry, which also added to her fame.

She took a career break in 2006 and rejoined the film industry in 2015. She started her career again with the comedy movie Hum Sab Ullu Hain.

== Filmography ==
=== Film ===
Year	Title	Role
1980	Sau Din Saas Ke	Maina
1983	Gupchup Gupchup (Marathi Film)	Roza, College Student
1985	Bewafai	Guddi
1985	Maa Kasam	Tribal Fat Girl/ Bholaram Daughter
1986	Aag Aur Shola	College Student
1986	Tan-Badan	Doctor's Wife
1986	Nagina	Bhanumati
1987	Hukumat	Prostitute in Red Light Area
1988	Kasam (1988 film)	
1989	Jaisi Karni Waisi Bharni	Bela Batliwala
1989	Elaan-E-Jung	Football, Massage girl
1990	Amiri Garibi	Fat Girl in Rickshaw
1990	Mera Pati Sirf Mera Hai	Dolly
1991	Farishtay	Pandit's wife
1991	Karz Chukana Hai	Dudhwani Khareram
1991	Narasimha	Fisherwomen
1991	Swarg Yahan Narak Yahan	School Principal/Hostelmanager/Radha's Aunt
1991	Trinetra	Mona's friend
1992	Shola Aur Shabnam	Guddi
1992	Khiladi	Chandramukhi/ Vada Pav
1992	Chamatkar	She-Girl
1992	Honeymoon (1992 film)	Maizaah
1992	Zulm Ki Hukumat	
1992	Jeena Marna Tere Sang	College Student
1992	Balwaan	Radha
1993	Aashiq Awara	Batwoman in Club
1993	Waqt Hamara Hai	College Student
1993	Dil Tera Aashiq	Passenger in the train
1993	Santaan	Vachani Daughter
1994	Dulaara	College friend of Priya
1994	Ikke Pe Ikka	Guddi
1995	Policewala Gunda	Renu
1996	Vijeta (1996 film)	Rani
1996	Beqabu	Rahmi's friend
1996	Dil Tera Diwana (1996 film)	Momo
1996	Chhote Sarkar	Doctor/ Police Constable
1997	Tarazu	Pooja Friend
1998	Dulhe Raja	Ajgar Singh's Wife
1998	Aunty No. 1	Asha
1999	Rajaji	Kalicharan's Wife
1999	Biwi No 1	Travel Agent
2001	Dil Ne Phir Yaad Kiya (2001 film)	Komal Singh
2002	Aadhar (Marathi Film)	Mrs Sharma
2010	Khuda Kasam	Julie
2011	Meri Marzi	
2015	Hum Sab Ullu Hain	
2019	Zindagi Tumse	Durga
2020	Kaamyaab	herself
2022	Mister Mummy	Burnol
2024	Vijay 69	Parminder Bakshi

=== Television ===
Year	Title	Role	Notes
1986	Idhar Udhar	Moti Shabnam	
1993	Zabaan Sambhal Ke		
1995	Shreeman Shreemati	Mrs. Mehta	
1996	Sorry Meri Lorry		
2007	Agadam Bagdam Tigdam	Rosie	
2012	Mrs. Kaushik Ki Paanch Bahuein	Paddy Aunty	
2013	Doli Armaano Ki	Bua	
2018	Yeh Un Dinon Ki Baat Hai	Principal Ma'am VJN College	
2019	Hello Zindagi	Bijoya Di	
2025	Zyada Mat Udd	Ammi	
2025–2026	Udne Ki Aasha	Mandira Simgh	

== Theatre ==
In 2019, Guddi Maruti portrayed Bijoya Di in the stage play Hello Zindagi, directed by Raman Kumar and produced by Rahul Bhuchar for Felicity Theatre.
