= Prema Sikharam =

- Directed by: Satya Gopal Bhatnagar
- Produced by: B. Krishna Reddy; Manoj Bhatnagar
- Starring: Prashanth; Mamta Kulkarni; Arun Pandian
- Edited by: Anil Malnad
- Music by: Manoj Saran
- Distributed by: Saraswati Film International; Sameera Films & Studios
- Release dates: 22 July 1992 (Telugu); 5 April 1994 (Hindi)
- Running time: 137 minutes
- Country: India
- Languages: Telugu; Hindi

Prema Sikharam (transl. Mount of Love) is a 1992 Indian Telugu-language romance film directed by Satya Gopal Bhatnagar. It was also released in Hindi as Anokha Premyudh in 1994. The film stars Prashanth, Mamta Kulkarni and Arun Pandiyan. The music was composed by Manoj Saran. The film was also dubbed in Tamil as Rojakkal Unakkaga.

== Cast ==
- Prashanth as Prashanth
- Mamta Kulkarni as Preeti
- Arun Pandiyan as Anthony
- Sithara as Manasa
- Rami Reddy as Sher Khan

Telugu version

- Ranganath as Preeti's father
- Nirmalamma as Prashanth's grandmother
- Brahmanandam as lecturer
- Babu Mohan as Preeti's paternal uncle
- Sudhakar as Preeti's maternal uncle
- Ali as Prashanth's friend
- Uttej as Prashanth's friend

Hindi version

- Shakti Kapoor
- Aruna Irani
- Satish Shah
- Paintal as Ganpat
- Prashant Sagar

== Soundtrack ==
=== Telugu version ===
#	Song title	Singer(s)
1	"Nene Tharalaaga"	
2	"Kassu Mane "	
3	"Prakuthiloni"	
4	"Sukhala Chukkala"	
5	"College Ladies"	
6	"Horugali Jorulo"	

=== Hindi version ===
#	Song title	Singer(s)
1	"Chhat Pe Aaja Saiyyan"	Malgudi Shubha
2	"College Ki Beauty Ne"	S. P. Balasubrahmanyam
3	"Dil Dhadke Tere Liye"	Lata Mangeshkar, S P Balasubrahmanyam
4	"Dil Kho Chuke Hole Hole"	Kumar Sanu
5	"Saajan Mera Tera Pyar Ho Amar"	Lata Mangeshkar, S P Balasubrahmanyam
6	"Pyar Karnewale"	Kavita Krishnamurthy, Udit Narayan
7	"O Preeti"	Kumar Sanu, Alka Yagnik
