= Iqbal Durrani =

Indian filmmaker

- Born: 5 February 1956 (age 70); Banka, Bihar, India
- Occupations: Writer, director, producer
- Spouse: Mamta Durrani
- Children: Mashaal Durrani
- Parent: Shujayat Ali (father)

Iqbal Durrani is an Indian writer, director, actor and producer of Hindi films.

== Filmography ==
| Year | Title |
|---|---|
| 1987 | Moti Sher |
| 1988 | Kaal Chakra |
| | Mera Shikaar |
| | Aazma Kar Dekho |
| | Zakhmi Aurat |
| 1989 | Khoj |
| 1990 | Majboor |
| | Shandaar |
| | Shiva |
| | Muqaddar Ka Badshaah |
| | Qatil |
| 1991 | Saugandh |
| | Naya Zaher |
| | Benaam Badsha |
| | Shanti Kranti |
| | Phool Aur Kaante |
| 1992 | Mr. Bond |
| | Naseebwala |
| | Nach Govinda |
| | Sheshnaag |
| | Izzat |
| | Dil Aashna Hai |
| 1993 | Insaniyat Ke Devta |
| | Pardesi |
| | Dhartiputra |
| 1994 | Betaaj Badshah |
| | Khuddar |
| 1995 | Aatank Hi Aatank |
| 1998 | Yamraaj |
| | Kohram |
| | Mehendi |
| 1999 | MaaKasam |
| 2001 | Mitti |
| | Zahreela |
| 2004 | Dukaan |
| 2015 | Hum Tum Dushman Dushman |

== Books ==
He wrote Gandhi Se Pehle Gandhi on the life of revolutionary tribal Birsa Munda of Jharkhand. Published in 2008, it was acclaimed both in the literary and the film world and was compared with Maxim Gorky's Mother by critics.

He was invited to speak on Bhagwan Mahavir's life and his teachings by various Jain organisations. Despite his Muslim religion, he was invited inside a Digambar Jain Temple (Ranchi) to speak in front of Jain Priests on Mahavir.

He writes books and scripts with spiritual contents. At present, he is working on Bhagwan Shri Mahavir. Iqbal Durrani is the first to translate Samveda in Hindi and Urdu.

== Awards ==
His awards for social activities and writing, including:

- Jharkhand Ratna award in the year 2008 at Ranchi by Pt. Raghunath Academy Santhali Cinema & Art.
- Rajiv Gandhi Global Excellence award in the year 2010 at N. Delhi by Urdu Press of India.
- Babasaheb Ambedkar award in the year 2011 at Mumbai by Maharaje Yashwantrao Holkar Prathishtan.
- Vidya Vachaspati's degree (Equivalent to Doctorate's degree) awarded by Sahitya Kala Sangam, Pratapgarh.

In 2009, he contested Lok Sabha elections but lost.
