= Kismat (1995 film) =

- Release poster
- किस्मत
- Directed by: Harmesh Malhotra
- Written by: Anwar Khan (dialogues)
- Story by: K. B. Pathak
- Produced by: Harmesh Malhotra
- Starring: Govinda; Mamta Kulkarni
- Cinematography: Shyam Shiposkar
- Edited by: Govind Dalwadi
- Music by: Anand–Milind
- Production company: Eastern Films
- Release date: 16 June 1995
- Country: India
- Language: Hindi

Kismat (transl. Destiny) is a 1995 Indian Hindi-language action thriller film directed by Harmesh Malhotra. It stars Govinda and Mamta Kulkarni.

== Plot ==
Rajan (Kabir Bedi) gets Geeta (Raakhee) pregnant and wants her to get an abortion, but Geeta refuses, and gives birth to a baby boy and leaves him in an orphanage. Fate plays a strange trick and the baby is adopted by Geeta and her new husband ACP Anand (Suresh Oberoi), who are led to believe that the child is Anand's. Rajan goes abroad and loses touch with Geeta. Things start to heat up when the baby, all grown up, starts working with Rajan, who has now returned from abroad, and taken to crime.

== Cast ==
- Govinda as Ajay
- Mamta Kulkarni as Madhu
- Rakhee Gulzar as Geeta
- Kabir Bedi as Rajveer Singh aka Rajan
- Suresh Oberoi as ACP Anand
- Asrani as Banke
- Kunickaa Sadanand as Banke's Wife
- Aparajita (hindi actress)|Aparajita as Shanti, Anand's wife.
- Bob Christo as Charlie Walcott
- A. K. Hangal as Nanaji
- Tej Sapru as Dara
- Tiku Talsania as Seth Dhaniram
- Yunus Parvez as Seth Jhunjhunwala
- Viju Khote as Havaldar Talwar Singh
- Anil Nagrath as John, Rajan's henchman
- Vikas Anand as Anti-Corruption Bureau Official
- Brownie Parasher as Rajan's henchman
- Sanjeeva as Dara's henchman

== Soundtrack ==
The music was composed by Anand–Milind.

Song	Singer
"Koi Bhi Na Jaane"	Abhijeet
"Kuch Kuch Hota Hai"	Udit Narayan, Sadhana Sargam
"Hua Yeh Hungama"	Udit Narayan, Alka Yagnik
"Teri Kismat Mein"	Poornima
"Yeh Kya Mujhko"	Kumar Sanu, Alka Yagnik
"Hum Hain Deewane"	Udit Narayan, Sadhana Sargam
