= Vaade Iraade =

Vaade Iraade वादे इरादे
- Directed by: Kalpana Bhardwaj
- Produced by: Ashok Sharma; Vijay Sharma
- Starring: Ayush Kumar; Mamta Kulkarni
- Cinematography: Kamalakar Rao
- Edited by: V.N. Mayekar
- Music by: Jatin–Lalit
- Production company: Kalpana Films
- Distributed by: B4U Entertainment
- Release date: 10 October 1994
- Running time: 150 min.
- Country: India
- Language: Hindi

Vaade Iraade (transl. Promises and Intentions) is a 1994 Indian Bollywood drama film directed by Kalpana Bhardwaj under the banner of Kalpana Films. It stars Ayush Kumar and Mamta Kulkarni in pivotal roles.

== Plot ==
Ajay, a student neglects his studies and spends time in writing poems. College teachers complain to his elder brother who is the Principal of college. Ajay never give up his passion on poetry and leaves house to establish himself as a poet.

== Cast ==
- Ayush Kumar as Ajay Tripathi
- Mamta Kulkarni as Nikita Sekhri
- Suchitra Krishnamoorthi as Jyoti
- Kulbhushan Kharbanda as Mr. Sekhri
- Vijayendra Ghatge as Principal Tripathi
- Satyendra Kapoor as Dindayal Sidhu
- Rakesh Bedi as Bhatt
- Anjan Srivastav as Aziz Miyan
- Yunus Parvez as Baba
- Tiku Talsania as Natwarlal Lal
- Javed Khan as Nawab
- Irrfan Khan as Naresh Tripathi

== Soundtrack ==
The soundtrack of the movie was composed by the duo Jatin-Lalit. The lyrics were written by Dev Kohli and Madan Pal.

#	Title	Singer(s)
1	"Hum Apna Naam Lekar"	SP Balasubramanyam
2	"Tum Ho Meri Sweet Heart"	SP Balasubramanyam, Kavita Krishnamurthy
3	"Dil Nashi Hai"	Asha Bhosle
4	"Naghmon Ke Rang"	Pankaj Udhas
5	"Yeh Dil Deewana"	Jatin, Poornima
6	"Main No 1 Hoon"	Poornima
7	"Teri Zindagi Hai"	SP Balasubramanyam
