= Deepak Malhotra =

American professor

Deepak Malhotra is an American professor, focusing in negotiation strategy, trust development, international and ethnic dispute resolution, and competitive escalation. He is currently the Eli Goldston Professor of Business Administration at Harvard Business School.

== Publications ==
- Negotiating the Impossible: How to Break Deadlocks and Resolve Ugly Conflicts (without Money or Muscle) (2018), Berrett-Koehler Publishers; ISBN 9781523095483.
- I Moved Your Cheese: For Those Who Refuse to Live as Mice in Someone Else’s Maze (2011), Berrett-Koehler Publishers; ISBN 9781609940652.
- Negotiation Genius: How to Overcome Obstacles and Achieve Brilliant Results at the Bargaining Table and Beyond (2007), Bantam Books; ISBN 9780553804881.
- The Peacemaker's Code : An Impending War. An Invincible Enemy. An Unlikely Hero. (2021),

Deepak Malhotra Publisher; ISBN 9781736548530.
