= Andolan (1995 film) =

1995 film by Aziz Sejawal

- Promotional Poster
- Directed by: Aziz Sejawal
- Written by: Anees Bazmee
- Produced by: Sajid Nadiadwala
- Starring: Sanjay Dutt; Govinda; Mamta Kulkarni; Somy Ali
- Cinematography: Rajan Kinagi; S. Pappu
- Music by: Nadeem-Shravan
- Distributed by: Nadiadwala Grandson Entertainment Pvt.Ltd.
- Release date: 3 March 1995
- Country: India
- Language: Hindi
- Budget: ₹3.75 crore
- Box office: ₹10.22 crore

Andolan (transl. Protest) is a 1995 Indian Hindi-language action film directed by Aziz Sejawal and produced by Sajid Nadiadwala. It stars Sanjay Dutt, Govinda, Mamta Kulkarni, and Somy Ali in lead roles. Actress Divya Bharti was the first choice to play Guddi in this film. Upon her death, the role was portrayed by Mamta Kulkarni. This film marked veteran actress Asha Parekh's final role before retirement. The film was a superhit at the box office.

== Plot ==
Aniket — "the one without a home" — is orphaned in the big city when his father dies. Pradhan takes him into his family, where he grows up with the mill worker's son Adarsh, under the wing of Adarsh's mother Bharti. The two similar-aged boys share books and values, growing up to go on to study in the same college.

Here, Aniket falls in love with Guddi, but is unable to profess his love, afraid that she is out of his league because she is rich. Guddi also loves Aniket, but cannot bring herself to admit it to him. Adarsh, the prankster he is, manages to get them to confess their love to each other by getting them to write love letters to each other on the day Aniket is about to leave for London for further studies after college. The two get to know each other's feelings, and part for the moment on a happy note. Meanwhile, Adarsh falls for Anita in college, and the two become close after playing pranks on each other.

Adarsh, now a graduate, is employed by Sabra in his factory as the manager, and signs the employment contract without reading it. This is the same factory from where Pradhan has retired with a lot of goodwill, and his colleagues bank on it to choose Adarsh as their union leader.

They also bank on Adarsh's earlier heroics, when he stopped Baba Nayak from leading them into burning down the factory, as part of a pact between Baba and Sabra, with politician Dalvi behind them. The arson would have given Sabra a pretext to drive the factory-workers out of their homes and claimed the land, but Adarsh's intervention scotches the plan. It also brings him to the notice of Baba, Sabra, and another politician: Azaad Deshpande.

Now, with Adarsh as his employee, Sabra tries to malign him by saying he signed off on a plan to get rid of all factory-workers aged above 50. When the workers approach Pradhan to try and blame him, he calms them and offers them the land under his home to build their own factory. Bharti offers her savings as the first bit of money in the poll to build the factory.

On the day of its inauguration, Baba Nayak and his men publicly force Pradhan to hand over the land to him. The police come, but take away a restrained Adarsh instead, torturing him in prison for a day. The tormentors include Anita's elder brother, Inspector Pathare. Meanwhile, Nayak and his men murder Pradhan in public.

When the cops drop off Adarsh, who has sustained multiple injuries, back home, he is flabbergasted to see his father dead. He performs his last rights, and then tries to avenge those who wronged him. However, Deshpande stops him, and then gets Baba, Dalvi, Sabra, and others to back off him. He also gives Adarsh money to start his own construction firm.

A year down the line, Adarsh's firm is successful, and he has moved his mother into a bungalow. That's when Aniket returns, having become an engineer. He is initially elated at Adarsh's success, but then mourns Pradhan's death. He then joins Adarsh's firm. However, certain developments – like the use of substandard cement in construction work with Adarsh's nod and Adarsh trying to get his signature on an unapproved plan based on which construction has already been completed – force him to leave. Meanwhile, Adarsh goes after Sabra, intending to bankrupt him.

Aniket joins another company, and soon finds himself probing the collapse of a bridge linked to Deshpande, but actually built by Adarsh's firm. His investigation leads him to discover Adarsh's role in the bridge's construction. Intending to pay Bharti back for raising him, Aniket takes the blame of the collapse-related deaths on himself. Adarsh looks to get him exonerated, but at Deshpande's cost. The latter ropes in Dalvi and Baba Nayak and causes a leak at one of Adarsh's plants, which kills thousands of people.

As the cops search for Adarsh, Pathare pretends to commiserate with Aniket and set him free, but Aniket sees through the ruse and kills him with his own gun. Then he goes after Dalvi. Meanwhile, Adarsh has gone after Baba Nayak. They separately manage to subdue their marks and bring them to where Deshpande is trying to garner public support by appealing to the kin of those killed in the gas leak. Adarsh and Aniket then kill Dalvi, Baba, and Deshpande amid the funeral pyres of the deceased, and let people know who were really responsible for the deaths.

== Cast ==
- Sanjay Dutt as Adarsh
- Govinda as Aniket
- Mamta Kulkarni as Guddi
- Somy Ali as Anita
- Asha Parekh as Bharti
- Dalip Tahil as Sabra
- Mohan Joshi as Dalvi
- Rami Reddy as Baba Nayak
- Ishrat Ali as Azaad Deshpande
- Deepak Shirke as Inspector Pathare
- Vikram Gokhale as Pradhan
- Madan Jain as Inspector Subhash
- Vinay Sapru as Ashraf
- Ghanashyam Nayak as College Professor
- Achyut Potdar as Interviewer
- Kamaldeep as Saxena

== Soundtrack ==
Andolan

Soundtrack album by Nadeem-Shravan
- Released: 1995
- Recorded: 1994
- Venue: Mumbai
- Studio: Anand Recording Studio
- Genre: Feature film soundtrack
- Length: 41:41
- Language: Hindi
- Labels: Tips Cassettes & Records Co.
- Director: Nadeem-Shravan
- Producer: Sajid Nadiadwala

Nadeem-Shravan chronology
| Stuntman (1994) | Andolan (1995) | Gaddaar (1995) |

The music of the film is composed Duo Nadeem-Shravan and lyrics written By Sameer. The soundtrack was released with 1995.

| # | Title | Singer(s) |
|---|---|---|
| 1 | "Dil To Khoya Hai" | Kumar Sanu and Alka Yagnik |
| 2 | "Aayegi Har Pal Tujhe" | Kumar Sanu and Alka Yagnik |
| 3 | "Kitne Dino Ke Baad" | Kumar Sanu and Alka Yagnik |
| 4 | "Nazar Mein Tu" | Kumar Sanu and Sapna Mukherjee |
| 5 | "Mujhe To Hone Laga" | Udit Narayan, Kumar Sanu and Alka Yagnik |
| 6 | "Dil Hamne Diya" | Kumar Sanu and Alka Yagnik |
| 7 | "Maza Karle Meri Jaan" | Sudesh Bhosle and Bali Brahmbhatt |
| 8 | "Badal Gayee Hai Yeh Duniya | Udit Narayan and Roop Kumar Rathod |
