= Somy Ali =

Pakistani actress (born 1976)

- سومی علی
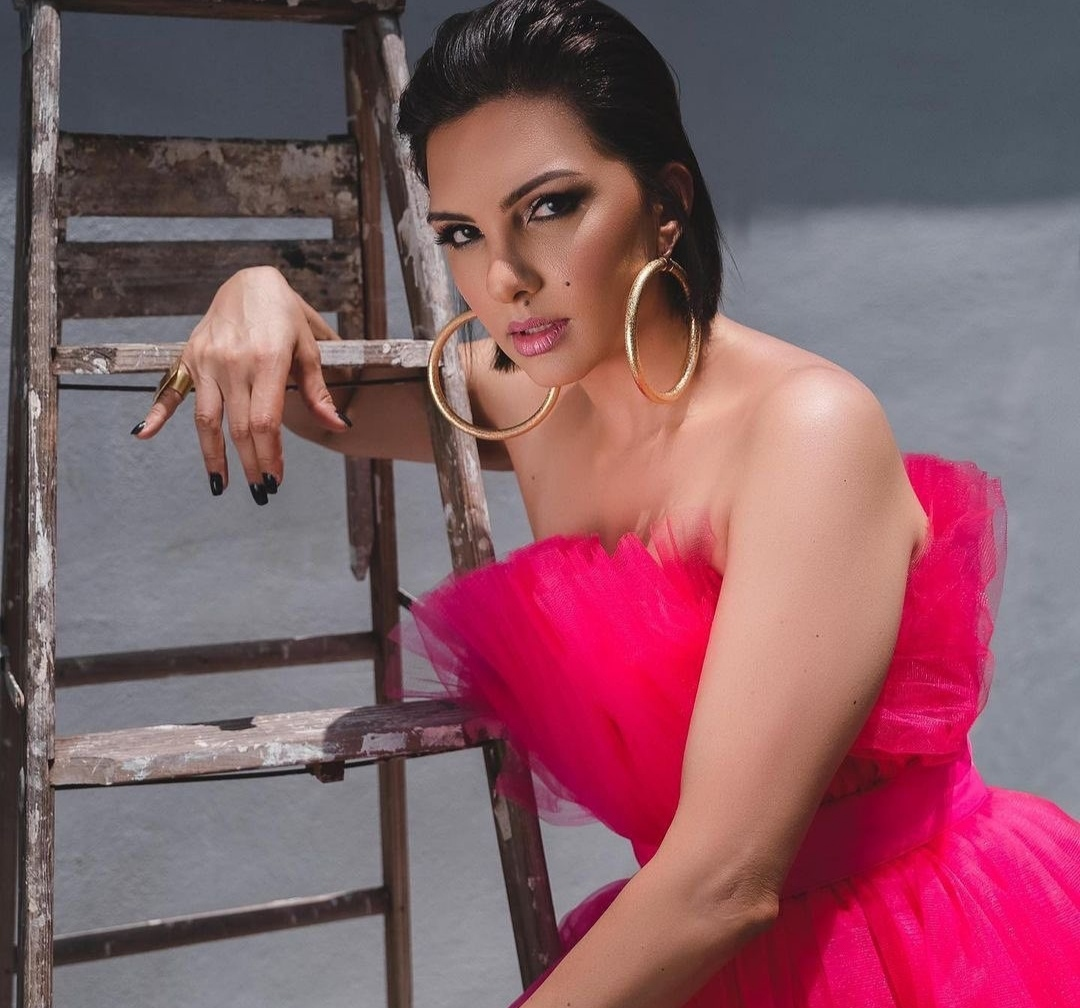
- Ali in 2022
- Born: 25 March 1976 (age 50); Karachi, Pakistan
- Education: Connecticut School of Broadcasting; University of Miami (dropped out); Nova Southeastern University (BS); New York Film Academy (MFA)
- Occupations: Actor, founder and president of No More Tears USA
- Partner: Salman Khan (1991–1999)

Somy Ali (Urdu: سومی علی; born 25 March 1976) is a Pakistani-American actress, writer, filmmaker, model and activist who has worked in Bollywood films. She runs a non-profit organization named No More Tears since 2007.

== Early life and education ==
Somy was born on 25 March 1976, in Karachi in Sindh, Pakistan into a family of wealth and prosperity. Her mother Tehmina is Iraqi and her father Madad Ali Madan is originally from Bombay, India. After studying at the Convent of Jesus and Mary, Karachi until age 9, she moved to South Florida in the United States with her mother and brother. During an interview, Ali revealed that she was sexually abused at the ages of 5 and 9 by her household staff while living in Karachi, and when she moved to Florida at age 9, at 14, she was raped by a boy, 17, in Miami. Her mother was also a victim of domestic violence in Pakistan that she and her brother would have to witness.

After she dropped out of school, Ali convinced her father to allow her to move to the home of Bollywood in Mumbai, India, at age 16 due to her inspiration from her teenage crush, Bollywood actor, Salman Khan. She was involved in modeling projects and also performed in Hindi movies while in Mumbai. She had ten appearances in Bollywood movies between 1991 and 1998, as a leading lady with top Bollywood actors.

She moved back to Florida, and acquired her GED, and then attended Nova Southeastern University in Davie, Florida, where she majored in psychology, and obtained her undergraduate degree in two years. She also became very interested in journalism and documentary filmmaking. She then attended the University of Miami to obtain a masters degrees in broadcast journalism, psychology and filmmaking. She went on to attend New York Film Academy. where she graduated to a degree in filmmaking, direction, screenwriting and editing. Her early projects included short films on abortion, domestic violence, and teenage suicide. She later attended the Connecticut School of Broadcasting in Florida and obtained a certification in broadcast journalism in 2004.

== Career ==
Ali became involved with women's rights issues in South Asia. She works toward publicizing, bringing the plight of rape and domestic violence victims. Ali has written articles about rape victims Shazia Khalid, Sonia Naz and Mukhtaran Mai. "My goal is to help all of these women and make sure that every girl/woman in my country and universally can obtain an education and has her basic human rights," says Ali. Revenue from her Films in Bollywood and a t-shirt line, she initiated to sell in order to gain donations for her non-profit organization No More Tears, which was founded in 2007. In 2011, Ali was honored with the American Heritage Award from the American Immigration Council for her work with No More Tears, The Daily Point of Light Award 15 April 2015, by President George H. W. Bush and The National Domestic Violence Month "A Proclamation" by President Barack Obama for her work with No More Tears.In 2013 Somy was the recipient of the L'Oreal Woman of Worth Award.

In 2021, Ali and her non-profit organization No More Tears were featured in the Discovery+ docuseries Fight or Flight.

== Personal life ==
She was in a relationship with Bollywood superstar Salman Khan for eight years from 1991 to 1999. In December 1999, she returned to South Florida to continue her studies. In 2024, Ali revealed that her relationship with Khan had ended due to alleged infidelity.

== Filmography ==
- Krishan Avtaar (1993) as Sonia Sawant
- Anth (1994) as Priya
- Yaar Gaddar (1994) as Shashi
- Teesra Kaun? (1994) as Priyanka
- Aao Pyaar Karen (1994) as Sonu Rai
- Andolan (1995) as Anita
- Mafia (1996) as Kiran Pawar
- Chupp (1997) as Asha Narang
