= Eena Meena Deeka =

- Promotional poster
- Directed by: David Dhawan
- Written by: Sanjeev Duggal
- Produced by: Nitin Manmohan
- Starring: Vinod Khanna; Rishi Kapoor; Juhi Chawla
- Cinematography: Rajan Kinagi
- Edited by: A. Muthu
- Music by: Anand–Milind
- Release date: 1994
- Country: India
- Language: Hindi

Eena Meena Deeka is a 1994 Indian Hindi-language comedy film directed by David Dhawan and produced by Nitin Manmohan. It stars Vinod Khanna, Rishi Kapoor and Juhi Chawla. Its plotline is loosely inspired by the 1989 movie Three Fugitives.

== Plot ==
Deeka has been in jail for several crimes, including bank robberies. When his prison sentence is over, he decides to go straight. While in a bank, he becomes a victim of a bungling bank robber, Inder or Eena, who needs money to get medical treatment for his mother. When the police arrive, they witness Eena with the notorious bank robber, and come to the conclusion that Deeka has gone back to his criminal ways. His attempts to convince them are in vain, and he must escape together with Eena for now, and he does so. The police are after Deeka, and he must get Eena to confess to the crime, and therefore clear his name. Eena is unwilling to confess, and runs away from Deeka. Deeka kidnaps DCP Ujwal Raja Bully's daughter, Meena. Later Eena and Meena fall in love. It is revealed that Deeka is Eena's long-lost brother who had been kidnapped in childhood by Bhujang, a criminal who wants his son Sunny to marry Meena. In the end, Bhujang and his sons are arrested, Deeka reunites with his family and Eena and Meena get married.

== Cast ==
- Vinod Khanna as Deeka
- Rishi Kapoor as Inder 'Eena'
- Juhi Chawla as Meena
- Anupam Kher as Ujjwal Raja Bully
- Kader Khan as Dabba
- Shakti Kapoor as Kali
- Kiran Kumar as Bhujang
- Gulshan Grover as Sunny
- Mohnish Bahl as Mangal
- Alok Nath as Kashi
- Anjana Mumtaz as Kamla, Raju's mother
- Shiva Rindani as Rana
- Lalit Mohan Tiwari as Harshad
- Arun Bakshi as Batli
- Dina Pathak as Savitri, Eena's mother
- Javed Khan as Anand
- Piyush Mittal as Pandey Inspector Jai
- Tiku Talsania as Gabbar
- Rajendra Nath as Cashier Parmeshwar in Bank
- Yunus Parvez as Hotel Owner Saxena
- Neena Gupta as Beggar Reema
- Dinesh Hingoo as Villager Laal
- Guddi Maruti as Villager Bela

== Soundtrack ==
Lyrics by Sameer and music by Anand–Milind.

#	Title	Singer(s)
1	"Eena Ko Mil Gayee Meena"	Kumar Sanu; Poornima
2	"Koi Kahe Deewana"	Udit Narayan
3	"Maine Kya Julam Kiya"	Udit Narayan; Poornima
4	"Saiyan Ke Saath Madhaiya Mein"	Kumar Sanu; Poornima
5	"Tere Dwar Khada Hai Jogi"	Sudesh Bhosle; Poornima; Arun Bakshi
6	"Towel Mein Baahar Jaaogi"	Kumar Sanu; Poornima
7	"Parody Song"	Sudesh Bhosle; Jolly Mukherjee; Poornima; Kavita Krishnamurthy
