= Nawaz Khan =

Afghan cricketer (born 1995)

Personal information
- Born: 29 October 1995 (age 31)
- Source: Cricinfo, 31 January 2017

Nawaz Khan (born 29 October 1995) is an Afghan cricketer. He is a right-handed batsman and a fast-medium bowler. He made his List A debut for Afghanistan A against Zimbabwe A during their tour to Zimbabwe on 31 January 2017. He made his first-class debut for Mis Ainak Region in the 2017–18 Ahmad Shah Abdali 4-day Tournament on 20 October 2017. He made his Twenty20 debut for Speen Ghar Tigers in the 2019 Shpageeza Cricket League on 11 October 2019.
