= Raj Kanwar =

Indian filmmaker (1961–2012)

- Kanwar in 1998
- Born: 28 June 1961; India
- Died: 3 February 2012 (aged 50); Singapore
- Occupations: Director, producer and screenwriter
- Spouse: Anita Kanwar
- Children: Karan Raj Kanwar; Abhay Raj Kanwar
- Relatives: K. Pappu (brother)

Raj Kanwar (28 June 1961 – 3 February 2012) was an Indian film director, writer, and producer who worked in Hindi films. He is known for directing Deewana (1992), Jeet (1996) and Farz (2001).

== Family and personal life ==
Kanwar was educated at Col. Brown Cambridge School in Dehradun. He has two sons, with his wife Anita Kanwar, Karan Raj Kanwar and Abhay Kanwar, who have both worked as film directors and producers. Filmmaker K. Pappu is his elder brother. On 3 February 2012, Kanwar died in Singapore from a kidney disease at the age of 50.

== Career ==
Kanwar began his career directing plays in Delhi. He then moved to Mumbai, where he worked as an assistant to directors like Shekhar Kapur and Raj Kumar Santoshi. His directorial debut was Deewana. Released in 1992, the film was a box office Blockbuster and marked the screen debut of Shahrukh Khan. He directed several other box office hits like Laadla (1994), Jaan (1996), Jeet (1996), Judaai (1997), Daag: The Fire (1999) and Badal (2000). Kanwar discovered actors like Lara Dutta and Priyanka Chopra, whom he cast in his film Andaaz in 2003. His last film was Sadiyaan (2010). Anurag Singh was a Chief Assistant with him for most of the films. Most of the lead characters in his films are named Karan and Kajal.

== Filmography ==
Year	Film	Director	Producer	Ref.
1987	Mr. India	Assistant		
1988	Ram-Avtar	Assistant		
1990	Ghayal	Assistant		
1992	Deewana	Yes		
1994	Laadla	Yes		
1995	Kartavya	Yes		
1996	Jaan	Yes		
1996	Jeet	Yes		
1997	Judaai	Yes		
1997	Itihaas	Yes	Yes	
1999	Daag: The Fire	Yes	Yes	
2000	Badal	Yes		
2000	Har Dil Jo Pyar Karega	Yes		
2000	Dhaai Akshar Prem Ke	Yes	Yes	
2001	Farz	Yes	Yes	
2002	Ab Ke Baras	Yes	Yes	
2003	Andaaz	Yes	Yes	
2006	Humko Deewana Kar Gaye	Yes	Yes	
2007	Raqeeb	No	Yes	
2010	Sadiyaan	Yes	Yes	
