= Mamta Kulkarni =

Indian actress (born 1972)

- Born: Mamta Kulkarni; 20 April 1972 (age 54); Bombay, Maharashtra, India
- Occupations: Actress; model
- Years active: 1991–2002
- Partner: Vicky Goswami (former)

Mamta Kulkarni (born 20 April 1972) is an Indian former actress and model turned Monk known for her work in Hindi cinema. One of the most successful actresses of her time, she has appeared in several commercially successful Hindi films such as Tirangaa (1993), Waqt Hamara Hai (1993), Krantiveer (1994), Karan Arjun (1995), Sabse Bada Khiladi (1995), Andolan (1995), Ghatak (1996), China Gate (1998) and Chhupa Rustam (2001). Her performance in Aashiq Awara (1993) won her the 1994 Filmfare Award for Best Female Debut. She quit the film industry after her appearance in the delayed film Kabhie Tum Kabhie Hum.

After a long controversial life and disappearance of more than 20 years, Mamta announced her Sannyasa and became Mahamandaleshwar of Kinnar akhara during 2025 Prayag Maha Kumbh Mela in presence of Acharaya Mahamandaleshvar of the same akhara, Lakshmi Narayan Tripathi. She performed all the rituals including Pindadanam, Pattabhishekam, etc., after which she adopted the new name Yamai Mamta Nand Giri.

In January 2025, Rishi Ajai Das, founder of Kinnar Akhara expelled Mamta from akhara with activist Laxmi Narayan Tripathi and also removed both from the post of Mahamandaleshwar citing connection of Mamta with D-Company and gangster Dawood Ibrahim.

== Early and personal life ==
Kulkarni was born on April 20, 1972, in Mumbai, Maharashtra, into a middle-class Marathi Brahmin family. Her father, Mukund Kulkarni, was a former transport commissioner of Mumbai. She has two sisters. Kulkarni was educated at St. Joseph's High School in Juhu. She actively participated in school plays and in cultural programs.

Kulkarni was in a relationship with Vicky Goswami until 2016.

She was given a name Shri Yamai Mamta Nand Giri when she was made Mahamandaleshwar of Kinnar Akhada.

== Career ==
Kulkarni made her film debut with the 1991 Tamil film Nanbargal which was a success. The following year, she reprised her role in its unsuccessful Hindi remake Mera Dil Tere Liye. She had her first commercially successful Hindi film in 1993 with the film Tirangaa. In the same year, she starred in Aashik Awara, which won her a Filmfare Award for Lux New Face of the Year. She went on to appear in many successful films such as Waqt Hamara Hai (1993), Krantiveer (1994), Karan Arjun, Sabse Bada Khiladi, and Andolan (All in 1995). She also did a few movies in Kannada, Telugu, Bengali and Malayalam languages.

In 1996, she made a cameo appearance in Ghatak, where she performed an item number, "Koi Jaaye Toh Le Aaye". The film's director Rajkumar Santoshi cast her as the female lead in his 1998 film China Gate, a remake of Seven Samurai. However, things did not go as planned. Relations between Santoshi and the actress soured. Rumours began circulating that Kulkarni had been dropped from the film, and was reinstated only after gangster Chhota Rajan intervened on her behalf.

Angered and frustrated at the turn of events, Kulkarni lashed out at Santoshi, accusing him of cutting her screen time because she had refused his advances. Santoshi denied all rumours related to the movie, and the matter was given a quiet burial. However, this proved to be the death blow to Kulkarni's career. She only appeared in a handful of movies after that, and new offers dried up. Her last successful film was Chhupa Rustam (2001). She quit movies after the 2002 film Kabhie Tum Kabhie Hum.

== Controversy ==
In June 2016, the Thane Police named Kulkarni as one of the accused involved in supplying ephedrine for illicit manufacture of methamphetamine to a ₹2000 crore international drug racket and gangster, intended for trafficking. It is alleged that Kulkarni along with her partner Vicky Goswami and other co-accused attended a meeting in an international drug ring in Kenya in January 2016.

In August 2024, the Bombay High Court quashed the 2016 drug case against Kulkarni, deeming the proceedings "manifestly frivolous and vexatious." The court concluded that the evidence was insufficient to sustain charges under the Narcotic Drugs and Psychotropic Substances Act, 1985, noting that Kulkarni's mere presence at a meeting did not warrant prosecution. The judges emphasized that continuing the case would constitute an abuse of the judicial process.

In April 2026, Kulkarmi created a controversy when she stated in a press conference in Gorakhpur, Uttar Pradesh that Dawood Ibrahim “did not carry out the Mumbai blasts and is not a terrorist”. This comments went viral on social media and it sparked a huge uproar, being condemned by many persons. Later she retracted and issuing the following statement- “I was referring to Vicky Goswami, not Dawood Ibrahim. Dawood is indeed a terrorist.”

== Life as a monk ==
In January 2025, Mamta Kulkarni was appointed Mahamandaleshwar of the Kinnar Akhada at the 2025 Prayag Maha Kumbh Mela in Prayagraj. During the ceremony, she performed the Pind Daan ritual at the Triveni Sangam and was given the spiritual name "Shree Yamai Mamta Nand Giri".

However, Rishi Ajay Das, the founder of Kinnar Akhada, expelled both Mamta Kulkarni and her appointer Lakshmi Narayan Tripathi from the Akhada during the Mela following massive outrage against this move. Das accused Tripathi and others of committing an unconstitutional act and violating the principles of Sanātana Dharma by appointing Kulkarni, citing her alleged involvement in treason and link with D-Company.

== Filmography ==
Year	Title	Language	Role	Notes
1991	Nanbargal	Tamil	Priya	Debut Film
1992	Mera Dil Tere Liye	Hindi	Priya R. Singh	
1992	Premasikharam	Telugu	Preeti	
1992	Donga Police	Telugu	Gowri	
1993	Tirangaa	Hindi	Sandhya	
1993	Aashik Awara	Hindi		
1993	Bhookamp	Hindi	Kavita Anand	
1993	Waqt Hamara Hai	Hindi	Mamta Vidrohi	
1993	Ashaant	Hindi	Sonali	Bilingual film
1993	Vishnu Vijaya	Kannada	Sonali	Bilingual film
1994	Anokha Premyudh	Hindi	Priti	
1994	Betaaj Badshah	Hindi	Tejeshwani / Gudiya	
1994	Krantiveer	Hindi	Mamta	
1994	Vaade Iraade	Hindi	Nikita Sekhri	
1995	Karan Arjun	Hindi	Bindiya	
1995	Andolan	Hindi	Guddi	
1995	Baazi	Hindi	Journalist Sanjana Roy	
1995	Policewala Gunda	Hindi	Renu	
1995	Sabse Bada Khiladi	Hindi	Sunita Das	
1995	Kismat	Hindi	Madhu	
1995	Ahankaar	Hindi	Naina	
1995	Dilbar		Priya Verma	
1995	Gangster		—	
1995	Bhagya Debata	Bengali		Special appearance
1996	Raja Aur Rangeeli	Hindi		
1996	Beqabu	Hindi	Reshmi Kapoor	
1996	Ghatak	Hindi	Dancer	(in song "Maara Re"), item number "Koi Jaaye To"
1997	Jeevan Yudh	Hindi	Kajal Choudhry	
1997	Krantikari	Hindi	Dancer	
1998	Qila	Hindi	Neeta	
1998	Jaane Jigar	Hindi	Meena and Meenu	(Double Role)
1998	China Gate	Hindi	Sandhya	
1998	Naseeb	Hindi	Pooja	
1999	Chandamama	Malayalam		Special appearance in the song "Rojaappoo Kavilathu"
2001	Bangshadhar	Bengali	Antara	
2001	Censor	Hindi	Nisha	
2001	Chhupa Rustam	Hindi	Sandhya	
2002	Divine Temple Khajuraho	Hindi	Devadasi	
2002	Kabhie Tum Kabhie Hum	Hindi	Sumona	
