= List of Hindi films of 1993 =

== Highest grossing films ==
| Number | Title | Production company | Cast |
|---|---|---|---|
| 1. | Aankhen | Chiragdeep International | Govinda, Chunky Panday, Raj Babbar, Kader Khan |
| 2. | Khal Nayak | Eros International | Sanjay Dutt, Jackie Shroff, Madhuri Dixit, Ramya Krishnan, Rakhee Gulzar |
| 3. | Darr | Yash Raj Films | Sunny Deol, Shah Rukh Khan, Juhi Chawla, Anupam Kher |
| 4. | Baazigar | Eros International | Shah Rukh Khan, Kajol, Shilpa Shetty, Rakhee Gulzar, Johnny Lever |
| 5. | Damini | Cineyug Entertainment | Rishi Kapoor, Meenakshi Sheshadri, Sunny Deol, Amrish Puri |
| 6. | Gumrah | Dharma Productions | Sanjay Dutt, Sridevi, Rahul Roy, Anupam Kher |
| 7. | Hum Hain Rahi Pyar Ke | Tahir Hussain Enterprises | Aamir Khan, Juhi Chawla, Dalip Tahil, Navneet Nishan |
| 8. | Dalaal | Prakash Mehra films | Mithun Chakraborty, Raj Babbar, Ravi Behl, Ayesha Jhulka |
| 9. | Tirangaa | Mehul Kumar | Nana Patekar, Raaj Kumar, Mamta Kulkarni, Deepak Shirke |
| 10. | Anari | Suresh Productions | Venkatesh, Karisma Kapoor, Rakhee Gulzar, Johnny Lever, Suresh Oberoi |
| 11. | Lootere | Suneel Darshan Films | Sunny Deol, Juhi Chawla, Naseeruddin Shah, Chunky Panday, Pooja Bedi |
| 12. | Gardish | Priyadarshan | Jackie Shroff, Dimple Kapadia, Mukesh Rishi, Amrish Puri |
| 13. | Kshatriya | Pushpa Movies | Dharmendra, Sunil Dutt, Vinod Khanna, Sunny Deol, Sanjay Dutt, Rakhee Gulzar, Meenakshi Sheshadri, Raveena Tandon, Divya Bharti, Kabir Bedi |
| 14. | Divya Shakti | Sameer Malkan | Ajay Devgn, Raveena Tandon, Amrish Puri |
| 15. | Waqt Hamara Hai | Nadiadwala Grandson Entertainment | Akshay Kumar, Suniel Shetty, Ayesha Jhulka, Mamta Kulkarni, Rami Reddy |
| 16. | Phool Aur Angaar | Salim Akhtar | Mithun Chakraborty, Shantipriya |

== Released films ==
| Title | Director | Cast | Genre |
|---|---|---|---|
| 15th August | Vicky Ranawat | Ronit Roy, Tisca Chopra, Shakti Kapoor, Prem Chopra | Action, Romance |
| Aadmi | Arshad Khan | Mithun Chakraborty, Gautami | Romance |
| Aadmi Khilona Hai | J. Om Prakash | Jeetendra, Reena Roy, Govinda, Meenakshi Seshadri | Drama, Romance |
| Aag Kaa Toofan | Kanti Shah | Dharmendra, Sadashiv Amrapurkar, Raza Murad, Asrani | Action |
| Aaina | Deepak Sareen | Jackie Shroff, Juhi Chawla, Amrita Singh | Romance |
| Aaja Meri Jaan | Ketan Anand | Krishan Kumar, Tanya Singh, Shammi Kapoor | Romance |
| Aaj Kie Aurat | Avtar Bhogal | Dimple Kapadia, Jeetendra | Action, Drama |
| Aakhri Chetawani | Deva Dutta | Bharat Bhushan, Sudha Chandran, Shakti Kapoor | |
| Aankhen | David Dhawan | Govinda, Chunky Pandey, Ritu Shivpuri, Shilpa Shirodkar | Comedy |
| Aashik Awara | Umesh Mehra | Saif Ali Khan, Mamta Kulkarni | Romance |
| Aasoo Bane Angaarey | Mehul Kumar | Jeetendra, Madhuri Dixit, Bindu, Deepak Tijori, Aruna Irani, Anupam Kher | Drama |
| Anari | K. Murali Mohana Rao | Venkatesh, Karishma Kapoor | Comedy, Romance, Drama |
| Andha Intaquam | Swaroop Kumar | Siddharth Ray, Shantipriya, Ronit Roy | Action |
| Anmol | Ketan Desai | Manisha Koirala, Rishi Kapoor | Romance |
| Ashaant | Kavita Ramsay | Akshay Kumar, Ashwini Bhave, Dr. Vishnuvardhan, Pankaj Dheer, Mamta Kulkarni | Action |
| Ashwa | Shyam Ranjankar | Yogesh Chikne, Mita Vashisht, Sadhu Meher | Children |
| Aulad Ke Dushman | Rajkumar Kohli | Armaan Kohli, Ayesha Jhulka, Kader Khan | Action, Romance |
| Baazigar | Abbas–Mustan | Shah Rukh Khan, Kajol, Shilpa Shetty, Johnny Lever, Rakhee Gulzar | Thriller |
| Badi Bahen | Kalpataru | Raj Babbar, Meenakshi Seshadri, Asrani, Kader Khan | Family, Romance |
| Balmaa | Lawrence D'Souza | Avinash Wadhavan, Ayesha Jhulka | |
| Bechain | Kawal Sharma | Sidhant, Salaria, Malvika Tiwari | Romance |
| Bedardi | Krishankant Pandya | Ajay Devgan, Urmila Matondkar, Naseeruddin Shah, Reena Roy | Romance, Drama |
| Bhagyawan | S. K. Subash | Govinda, Juhi Chawla, Pran, Asha Parekh, Aruna Irani, Ranjeet | |
| Bhookamp | Gautam Adhikari | Jeetendra, Rahul Roy, Mamta Kulkarni, Deepa Sahi | Action, Drama |
| Bomb Blast | Deepak Balraj Vij | Ronit Roy, Kishori Shahane, Aditya Pancholi | Action, Drama |
| Chandra Mukhi | Debaloy Dey | Salman Khan, Sridevi, Pran | Fantasy |
| Chor Aur Chaand | Pavan Kaul | Aditya Pancholi, Pooja Bhatt | Action, Romance, Thriller |
| Dalaal | Partho Ghosh | Mithun Chakraborty, Ayesha Jhulka, Raj Babbar | Action, Romance |
| Damini | Rajkumar Santoshi | Rishi Kapoor, Meenakshi Seshadri, Sunny Deol, Amrish Puri | Drama |
| Darr | Yash Chopra | Sunny Deol, Shah Rukh Khan, Juhi Chawla, Anupam Kher, Dalip Tahil | Thriller |
| Dhanwaan | K. Vishwanath | Ajay Devgn, Karishma Kapoor, Manisha Koirala | Romance, Drama |
| Dhartiputra | Iqbal Durrani | Mammootty, Jaya Prada, Rishi Kapoor, Nagma | Action, Drama |
| Dil Hai Betaab | K. C. Bokadia | Ajay Devgn, Vivek Mushran, Pratibha Sinha | Romance |
| Dil Hi To Hai | Asrani | Jackie Shroff, Divya Bharti, Shilpa Shirodkar | Romance, Drama |
| Dil Ki Baazi | Anil Ganguly | Akshay Kumar, Ayesha Jhulka | Drama |
| Dil Tera Aashiq | Lawrence D'Souza | Salman Khan, Madhuri Dixit | Romance, Comedy |
| Divya Shakti | Sameer Malkan | Ajay Devgn, Raveena Tandon | Action |
| Ek Hi Raasta | Deepak Bahry | Ajay Devgn, Raveena Tandon | Action, Adventure, Family, Thriller |
| Game | Anil Mattoo | Naseeruddin Shah, Aditya Pancholi, Rahul Roy, Sangeeta Bijlani | Crime, Action |
| Gardish | Priyadarshan | Jackie Shroff, Raj Babbar, Dimple Kapadia, Annu Kapoor | Crime, Drama |
| Geetanjali | Shakti Samanta | Rekha, Jeetendra | Romance, Drama |
| Ghar Aaya Mera Pardesi | Ravindra Peepat | Bhagyashree, Avinash Wadhawan | Romance |
| Gumrah | Mahesh Bhatt | Sanjay Dutt, Sridevi, Anupam Kher | Action, Crime, Drama, Thriller |
| Gunaah | Mahesh Bhatt | Sunny Deol, Dimple Kapadia, Sujata Mehta | Action, Thriller, Drama |
| Gurudev | Vinod Mehra | Rishi Kapoor, Sridevi, Anil Kapoor, Pran | Romance |
| Hasti | Ashok Gaikwad | Jackie Shroff, Nagma, Naseeruddin Shah, Varsha Usgaonkar | Romance, Drama |
| Hum Hain Rahi Pyar Ke | Mahesh Bhatt | Aamir Khan, Juhi Chawla | Romance |
| Hum Hain Kamaal Ke | Vijay Reddy | Anupam Kher, Aruna Irani, Sheeba Akashdeep | Comedy, Romance, Thriller |
| Ishq Aur Inteeqaam | Sunil Kumar | Raza Murad, Krishan Dhawan, Shakti Kapoor, Amita Nangia | Romance, Thriller |
| Izzat Ki Roti | K. Pappu | Sunny Deol, Juhi Chawla, Rishi Kapoor, Farha | Drama, Thriller, Romance |
| Jaanam | Vikram Bhatt | Rahul Roy, Pooja Bhatt | Romance, Drama |
| Kaise Kaise Rishte | Akash Verma | Ayesha Jhulka, Shahbaz Khan | Romance, Drama |
| Kayda Kanoon | Pradeep Mani | Akshay Kumar, Ashwini Bhave, Sudesh Berry, Paresh Rawal | Action, Crime |
| Khal-Naaikaa | Saawan Kumar Tak | Anu Aggarwal, Jeetendra, Jaya Prada | Thriller, Drama |
| Khal Nayak | Subhash Ghai | Sanjay Dutt, Madhuri Dixit, Jackie Shroff, Rakhee Gulzar | Action, Drama |
| Khoon Ka Sindoor | Ambarish Sangal | Upasana Singh, Kiran Kumar | Action |
| King Uncle | Rakesh Roshan | Jackie Shroff, Shah Rukh Khan, Niveditha Saraf | Drama |
| Krishan Avtaar | Ashok Gaikwad | Mithun Chakraborty, Somy Ali, Paresh Rawal | Action, Drama |
| Kshatriya | J. P. Dutta | Sunil Dutt, Dharmendra, Vinod Khanna, Sunny Deol, Sanjay Dutt, Meenakshi Seshadri, Raveena Tandon, Divya Bharti | Action |
| Kundan | K. C. Bokadia | Dharmendra, Jaya Prada, Amrish Puri | Action |
| Lootere | Dharmesh Darshan | Sunny Deol, Juhi Chawla, Pooja Bedi | Action, Drama, Musical, Romance |
| Maya Memsaab | Ketan Mehta | Deepa Sahi, Farooq Sheikh, Raj Babbar, Shah Rukh Khan | Drama, Mystery, Romance |
| Meherbaan | K. Ravishankar | Mithun Chakraborty, Ayesha Jhulka, Shantipriya, Anupam Kher | Romance, Drama |
| Muqabla | T. Rama Rao | Govinda, Karisma Kapoor, Farah Naaz | Action, Crime, Drama, Thriller |
| Parampara | Yash Chopra | Sunil Dutt, Vinod Khanna, Aamir Khan, Saif Ali Khan, Neelam, Raveena Tandon, Anupam Kher, Ashwini Bhave | Romance |
| Pardesi | Raj. N. Sippy | Mithun Chakraborty, Sumalatha | Action |
| Parwane | Ashok Gaikwad | Avinash Wadhawan, Shilpa Shirodkar, Paresh Rawal | Romance |
| Pehchaan | Deepak Shivdasani | Sunil Shetty, Saif Ali Khan, Shilpa Shirodkar, Madhoo | Romance, Drama |
| Pehla Nasha | Ashutosh Gowariker | Deepak Tijori, Pooja Bhatt, Raveena Tandon | Romance, Thriller |
| Phir Teri Kahani Yaad Aayee | Mahesh Bhatt | Pooja Bhatt, Rahul Roy | Romance, Drama |
| Phool | Singeetam Srinivasa Rao | Kumar Gaurav, Madhuri Dixit, Sunil Dutt, Rajendra Kumar | Romance, Drama |
| Phool Aur Angaar | Ashok Gaikwad | Mithun Chakraborty, Shantipriya, Paresh Rawal, Gulshan Grover | Action, Drama, Thriller |
| Platform | Deepak Pawar | Ajay Devgn, Tisca Chopra, Priya | Action, Family |
| Prateeksha | Lawrence D'Souza | Govinda, Shilpa Shirodkar, Jeetendra, Moushumi Chatterjee | Action, Drama |
| Pyaar Ka Tarana | Dev Anand | Anita Ayoob, Akshay Anand, Reema Lagoo | Drama, Romance |
| Pyar Pyar | Sunil Prasad | Sujoy Mukherjee, Rajeshwari Sachdev, Faraz Khan, Paresh Rawal | Romance |
| Rang | Talat Jani | Divya Bharti, Kamal Sadanah, Ayesha Jhulka, Amrita Singh, Jeetendra | Romance, Drama |
| Roop Ki Rani Choron Ka Raja | Satish Kaushik | Anil Kapoor, Sridevi, Anupam Kher, Paresh Rawal, Jackie Shroff | Comedy, Action |
| Rudaali | Kalpana Lajmi | Dimple Kapadia, Rakhee Gulzar, Raj Babbar | Drama |
| Sahibaan | Ramesh Talwar | Rishi Kapoor, Sanjay Dutt, Madhuri Dixit | Romance, Drama |
| Sainik | Sikander Bhartee | Akshay Kumar, Ashwini Bhave, Farheen | Action |
| Sangram | Lawrence D'Souza | Ajay Devgn, Ayesha Jhulka, Karisma Kapoor | Drama, Romance |
| Santaan | Dasari Narayana Rao | Jeetendra, Moushumi Chatterjee, Deepak Tijori, Neelam Kothari | Family, Drama, Romance |
| Sardar | Ketan Mehta | Paresh Rawal | Biography, Drama |
| Shaktiman | K. C. Bokadia | Ajay Devgn, Karisma Kapoor, Mukesh Khanna | Action, Crime, Drama, Romance |
| Shatranj | Aziz Sejawal | Jackie Shroff, Divya Bharti, Juhi Chawla, Mithun Chakraborty, Kader Khan | Comedy, Drama, Romance |
| Shreemaan Aashique | Deepak Anand | Rishi Kapoor, Urmila Matondkar, Anupam Kher | Comedy, Romance, Drama |
| Sir | Mahesh Bhatt | Naseeruddin Shah, Pooja Bhatt, Atul Agnihotri, Paresh Rawal, Gulshan Grover | Comedy, Drama, Romance, Action |
| Tadipaar | Mahesh Bhatt | Mithun Chakraborty, Pooja Bhatt, Juhi Chawla, Anupam Kher, Gulshan Grover | Action, Romance |
| Tahqiqaat | A. Jagannathan | Jeetendra, Aditya Pancholi, Sangeeta Bijlani, Ronit Roy, Farheen | Action |
| Tirangaa | Mehul Kumar | Nana Patekar, Raaj Kumar, Mamta Kulkarni, Varsha Usgaonkar | Action |
| Veerta | Shibu Mitra | Sunny Deol, Prosenjit Chatterjee, Jaya Prada | Romance, Drama |
| Waqt Hamara Hai | Bharat Rangachary | Akshay Kumar, Suniel Shetty, Ayesha Jhulka, Mamta Kulkarni | Comedy, Action, Romance |
| Yugandhar | N. Chandra | Mithun Chakraborty, Sangeeta Bijlani, Johnny Lever, Paresh Rawal, Kabir Bedi | Action |
| Zakhmo Ka Hisaab | Talukdars | Govinda, Farah | Drama |
