= Rakesh Sharma (disambiguation) =

Rakesh Sharma (born 1949) was the first Indian astronaut.

Rakesh Sharma may also refer to:

- Rakesh Sharma (civil servant) (born 1955), Indian businessman
- Rakesh Sharma (banker) (born 1958), Indian banker
- Rakesh Sharma (cricketer) (born 1972), Omani cricketer
- Rakesh Sharma (filmmaker) (fl. 2000s–2010s), Indian filmmaker
