= Hahakaar =

1996 Indian film directed by Sudarshan Rattan

- Directed by: Sudarshan Rattan
- Written by: Sudarshan Rattan
- Produced by: Sudarshan Rattan
- Starring: Akshay Anand; Chandni; Neelima Azim; Johny Lever; Alok Nath; Paresh Rawal
- Music by: Bappi Lahri
- Release date: 1996
- Country: India
- Language: Hindi

Hahakaar is a 1996 Bollywood film starring Akshay Anand, Chandni, Neelima Azim, Alok Nath, Johnny Lever and Paresh Rawal. The film was written, produced and directed by Sudarshan Rattan, with Shyam Kaushal as the action director of the film, while the music was composed by Bappi Lahiri.

== Plot ==
Police Inspector Saeed Rehman Alok Nath is an honest police officer. As he continued to work without accepting any bribes, he became a liability to some of his colleagues, including Inspector N. A. Pradhan Shafi Inamdar, who frames him for a crime Saeed did not commit and has him dismissed from the police force. Saeed vows to avenge this humiliation, and enlists the help of Rakesh Akshay Anand, who in turn enlists the aid of his beloved, Anita Chandni. During the course of trying to expose Inspector Pradhan, they come across the real kingpin behind Pradhan, namely the notorious Raunakbhai Paresh Rawal. And nothing comes in the way of Raunakbhai, as Saeed, Rakesh, and Anita will soon find out, as he has incriminating evidence against the Chief Minister of the State, as well as other dignitaries which leads to the climax of the film.

== Cast ==
1. Chandni
2. Akshay Anand
3. Johny Lever
4. Paresh Rawal
5. Neelima Azim
6. Alok Nath
7. Shafi Inamdar
8. Sudhir Pandey
9. Yunus Parvez
10. Dinesh Anand

== Music ==
The film's music was composed by Bappi Lahiri.

1. "Gore Gore Gaal Us Pe Kaala Til" - Kumar Sanu, Alka Yagnik
2. "Likh De Dil Ki Diary Pe" - Kavita Krishnamurthy, Sudesh Bhosle
3. "Pyar Ka Exam" - Sapna Mukherjee
4. "Pyar Ka Exam" v2 - Biloo Lahiri
5. "Tota Tota O Mere Tota" - Sudesh Bhosle, Alka Yagnik
