= Narsimha (1991 film) =

- Theatrical release poster
- Directed by: N. Chandra
- Screenplay by: N. Chandra
- Dialogues by: Kamlesh Pandey
- Story by: N. Chandra
- Produced by: N. Chandra
- Starring: Sunny Deol; Dimple Kapadia; Urmila Matondkar; Ravi Behl; Om Puri; Shafi Inamdar
- Cinematography: Binod Pradhan
- Edited by: N. Chandra
- Music by: Laxmikant–Pyarelal
- Production company: N. Chandra Productions
- Distributed by: Aarti Enterprises
- Release date: 5 July 1991
- Running time: 197 minutes
- Country: India
- Language: Hindi

Narsimha (transl. Man-lion), also spelt as Narsingh in Hindi letters, is a 1991 Indian Hindi-language action drama film directed, produced, written, and edited by N. Chandra. The film stars Sunny Deol and Dimple Kapadia as the main leads, supported by Urmila Matondkar, Ravi Behl, Om Puri and Shafi Inamdar.

The music of the film was composed by Laxmikant–Pyarelal and the lyrics of the songs were penned by Javed Akhtar.

== Plot ==
Past: Narsimha lives a quiet, middle-class life with his family. His elder sister is married and has a son. His youngest sister, Meera, was cheerful and brought happiness to the family. He visits the priest's house to select an auspicious time for his nephew's tonsure ritual. When he returns, he finds his neighbourhood engulfed in a communal conflict that spreads across the city. Narsimha seeks refuge and saves a family from goons. He finds most of his family, including his elder sister, has been murdered, and Meera is found abused and unconscious nearby. After an old man tries to stop and not touch her, Narsimha stops him, reveals who he is, and asks how it happened. The old man reveals that some ruffians molested Meera, and when he tried to save her, he was beaten and lost his legs. Meera tries to regain consciousness, but dies in Narsimha's arms, leaving him devastated.

Present: Devoid of purpose, Narsimha descends into alcoholism and crime. He begins working for Suraj Narayan Singh, also known as Bapji, a cruel landlord and political strongman who controls the city's crime, law, and order through wealth and force. Bapji is delighted to have Narsimha, who possesses both wit and strength despite lacking the will to live. This emotional detachment enables Narsimha to perpetrate Bapji's most difficult tasks. Believing himself invincible and the city subjugated, Bapji sees Narsimha as the ideal weapon for his complex problems.

While Narsimha remains drunk and reports to Bapji only when summoned for assignments and payment, he remains altruistic. He saves Anita's friend, Seema, and arranges for her to marry the company's manager, Anil, because Seema loved him.

Bapji publicly declares his invincibility, boasting that due to his power and wealth, he can't be killed by man or animal, front or back, left or right, or by any weapon or tool. This echoes the boon received by the mythological King Hiranyakashyap. He demands the citizenry consider him as their lord and master. InspectorVinod Rastogi, along with his family, had been transferred to the town a week ago. Informed by an alcohol barrel owner, Ghasiram, the inspector decides to investigate one of Bapji's cases, especially the one where a prisoner on parole was publicly killed in front of Bapji. Ghasiram, being the witness amongst the rest of the people, is also killed by Narsimha. After learning of this, Vinod also tries to get hold of Bapji but is killed later, leaving his wife, Mrs Rastogi, and daughter, Anita, in tears.

Conflict begins when Bapji learns through Tempo that his daughter, Meenu, is in love with her college mate, Ravi, the son of the now-deceased inspector. Bapji orders the principal to rusticate Ravi. Ravi reaches Bapji's mansion and tells him about his blind show of justice, even admitting his love for Meenu. Ravi is beaten and injured by four of Bapji's guards and then hospitalised. After visiting the hospital, Meenu learns of his condition and tries to kill herself by speeding her car. Bapji tries to stop her but fails; Meenu is hospitalised and reminds her father of his recent misdeed.

Enraged, Bapji threatens the inspector's wife to leave the locality; Anita loses her job, and the doctor discharges the still-injured Ravi. Bapji orders Narsimha to oust Ravi's family. However, witnessing Anita's honest and revolutionary character, Narsimha's empathy returns. Narsimha vows to protect Anita's family and stops working for Bapji, enraging the latter. Bapji employs his henchmen and informers to oppress the family, but Narsimha thwarts his efforts. But Anita and Ravi are reluctant towards him, disfavoring his efforts. After learning of his past, Anita supports him. Ravi befriends Narsimha, and Bapji's empire is henceforth endangered.

Later, Meenu meets Ravi, who shows angst towards her, but Meenu tries to convince him. Ravi, initially reluctant, reunites with Meenu; Narsimha and Anita gradually fall in love. Learning of this, Bapji forcibly decides to marry Meenu to someone else and detains her. Narsimha confronts Bapji during another auction in Bapji's private court, humiliating Bapji by killing his famed wrestlers and showing the city that their tyrant was, for the first time, afraid; the public leaves his court without fear. Narsimha is the only one strong and smart enough to openly challenge Bapji. Narsimha, Anita and some friends rouse the community against Bapji's rule. The pressure from the people, led by Narsimha and Anita, eventually forces the police to arrest Bapji for his crimes.

Ravi's relationship is further jeopardised when Meenu asks him to bring proof of her father's crimes, also learning that Bapji intends to use his clout to secure bail. Narsimha decides to help Ravi while also preparing his wedding procession. Released from jail, Bapji learns that Narsimha is captured. Narsimha makes him confess his crimes, leading Meenu to learn the truth about her father. Bapji eventually reveals that he organised the communal riot that killed Narsimha's family, using fear to keep the populace submissive, enraging Narsimha. Bapji stabs him and orders his men to bury the half-dead Narsimha inside a palace pillar and plaster it over.

The next morning, as Bapji attempts to forcibly wed Meenu, Anita and Ravi arrive with their friends to stop the wedding. Bapji releases prisoners from jail and arms them to suppress the crowd. When Meenu refuses the marriage and goes to Ravi, Bapji orders the lovers to be plastered alive into his palace wall. Then, the wounded Narsimha shatters the pillar he was entombed in, fulfilling his namesake—the fourth avatar of Vishnu who burst from a pillar to kill the demon Hiranyakashyap. Narsimha, his friends and the local people battle Bapji's goons. He vanquishes the criminals and breaks the wall, saving Meenu and Ravi. The structural damage causes the palace to crumble. One of the palace's tower clock's arms falls onto Bapji and kills him; his palace is almost destroyed. Ravi and Meenu join, and peace returns to the town. Anita and Narsimha finally express their mutual love.

== Cast ==
- Sunny Deol as Narsimha / Narsingh
- Dimple Kapadia as Anita Rastogi: Narsimha's love interest
- Urmila Matondkar as Meenu Singh: Bapji's daughter; Ravi's girlfriend
- Ravi Behl as Ravi Rastogi: Anita's brother; Meenu's boyfriend
- Om Puri as Suraj Narayan Singh "Bapji"
- Shafi Inamdar as Inspector Vinod Rastogi: Anita and Ravi's father
- Usha Nadkarni as Mrs Rastogi: Anita and Ravi's mother
- Johnny Lever as Tempo dada, Narsimha's ally #1
- Vijay Patkar as Narsimha's ally #2
- Satish Shah as Anil Saxena
- Om Shivpuri as Ramlal Saxena
- Dinesh Hingoo as Chemicals seller
- Nivedita Joshi-Saraf as Seema
- Shail Chaturvedi as Seema's father
- Achyut Potdar as Dharampal
- Virendra Saxena as College Principal
- Subbiraj as Dr Sujan Singh
- Sharat Saxena as Ghasiram
- Mahavir Shah as Jailor Arvind Shinde
- Kamaldeep as Ajit Khanna
- Brij Gopal as Suleiman

== Production ==
Ayesha Jhulka was initially cast for the role of Meenu, in what was to have been her debut film, but she was later replaced by Rajeshwari Sachdev (not to be confused with Raageshwari Loomba). The film was also supposed to be Rajeshwari’s debut. She shot for a few days, but her leg fractured during the shooting, so she was replaced by Urmila Matondkar.

This was the second film in which Urmila Matondkar worked with Sunny Deol. She had previously worked with him as his teenage sister in the 1987 film, Dacait.

== Music and soundtrack ==
Narsimha (Original Motion Picture Soundtrack)

Soundtrack album by Laxmikant–Pyarelal
- Released: February 1991
- Recorded: 1990
- Genres: Motion Picture Soundtrack, Filmi
- Label: Tips
- Producer: Laxmikant–Pyarelal

The soundtrack was composed by Laxmikant–Pyarelal and the lyrics of the songs were penned by Javed Akhtar. According to Box Office India, with around 18,00,000 units sold, this film's soundtrack was the year's tenth highest-selling album.

Track list

1. "Chup Chaap Tu Kyon Khadi Hai" – Alka Yagnik, Mohammed Aziz
2. "Hum Se Tum Dosti Kar Lo" – Alka Yagnik, Udit Narayan
3. "Jao Tum Chaahe Jahan" – Alka Yagnik, Amit Kumar
4. "Pakad Pakad Kheench Ke Pakad" – Sudesh Bhosle, Jolly Mukherjee, Kavita Krishnamurthy
5. "Tum Ho Ajnabi Toh" – Alka Yagnik, Laxmikant

== Reception ==
=== Critical response ===
India Today wrote, "Despite the irresistible lead duo of Sunny and Dimple, this is an Om Puri film. Playing the bad man, Puri gives evil an unforgettable face. Chandra's script is trite, and the anger, cliched."

== Awards ==
37th Filmfare Awards:

Nominated

- Filmfare Award for Best Villain - Om Puri
