= Rakesh =

- Pronunciation: [raːˈkeːʃ]
- Gender: Male
- Language: Sanskrit

Origin
- Meaning: Lord of full moon day
- Region of origin: India.

Other names
- Related names: Rajesh, Ritesh, Rahul

Rakesh (Devnagari: राकेश) is a masculine given name of Indian origin. It is derived from the Sanskrit language.

== Notable people with the given name ==
- Chaudhary Rakesh Singh Chaturvedi, Indian politician
- Mohan Rakesh, literary movement activist
- Rakesh Asthana, Indian Police Service officer of the 1984 batch of Gujarat cadre who served as the Special Director at the Central Bureau of Investigation, Police Commissioner of Delhi
- Rakesh Bapat, Indian actor
- Rakesh Bedi, Indian actor
- Rakesh Gangwal, former CEO and chairman of US Airways Group
- Rakesh Jhunjhunwala, Indian investor and trader
- Rakesh Khurana, professor at Harvard Business School
- Rakesh Kumar (kabaddi), Indian professional kabaddi player
- Rakesh Madhavan, Malaysian cricketer
- Rakesh Maria, Indian Police Service officer
- Rakesh Masih, Indian international football player
- Rakesh Patel, Indian cricketer
- Rakesh Pandey, Indian writer and author
- Rakesh Roshan, Indian producer, director and actor
- Rakesh Satyal, American novelist
- Rakesh Sethi, Indian banker
- Rakesh Sharma, first Indian in space
- Rakesh Sharma (cricketer), Omani cricketer
- Rakesh Sharma (filmmaker), Indian filmmaker
- Rakesh Singh (politician) (born 1962), Indian politician
- Rakesh Singh (soldier) (1970–1993), Indian Army soldier
- Rakesh Yankaran, musician from Trinidad and Tobago
- Rakesh Raxstar, British Punjabi rapper
