= Morchha =

Morcha
- Directed by: Ravikant Nagaich
- Story by: Ramesh Pant
- Produced by: Rakesh; Gopikrishna Global Entertainers
- Starring: Ravi Behl, Aruna Irani, Suresh Oberoi, Jagdeep, Shakti Kapoor, Jayshree T., Mac Mohan
- Music by: Bappi Lahiri; Ramesh Pant (lyrics), Faruk Kaisar (lyrics)
- Release date: 16 May 1980 (India)
- Country: India
- Language: Hindi

Morchha (transliteration: Front/Position) is a 1980 film produced for Gopikrishna Global Entertainers by Rakesh and directed by Ravikant Nagaich. This action drama casts Ravi Behl, Aruna Irani, Chandrashekhar, Jagdeep, Jayshree T., Mac Mohan, Shakti Kapoor, Suresh Oberoi.

Ravi Behl made his acting debut with a smaller role in this movie.

== Cast ==
- Ravi Behl
- Aruna Irani
- Ammi Mahendra
- Anita
- Chandrashekhar
- Ganesh
- Jagdeep
- Jayshree T.
- Mac Mohan
- Kajal Kiran as Guest appearance as the dancer in "Ab Ki Baras Bada Juliam Hua"
- Mahindram
- Mala Jaggi
- Pandey
- Prem Bedi
- Prem Kumar
- Rammi
- Shahajehan
- Shakti Kapoor
- Suresh Oberoi
- Thomas Lee
- Vijaya Bhanu

== Soundtrack ==
All music is composed by Bappi Lahiri.

No.	Title	Singer(s)	Length
1.	"Aab Ki Baras Bada Juliam Hua"	Usha Mangeshkar, Chorus
2.	"Dil Dena Hai Aaj Hi Dedo"	Usha Mangeshkar, Chorus
3.	"Koi Ban Jaaye Apna Yaar"	Chandrani Mukherjee, Preeti Uttam Kumar
4.	"Let's Dance For the Great Guy Bruce Lee"	Bappi Lahiri, Annette Pinto, Chorus
5.	"Pehle To Bhajia Paao Tha Mushkil"	Jagdeep, Bappi Lahiri, Usha Mangeshkar
