= Jeevan Yudh =

- Promotional poster
- Directed by: Partho Ghosh
- Screenplay by: Anirudh Tiwari; Partho Ghosh
- Dialogues by: Bengali: Ranjan Bose; Tarun Ghosh; Partho Ghosh; Hindi: Anirudh Tiwari
- Story by: Ranbir Pushp
- Produced by: Piyush Chakravorthy
- Starring: Raakhee; Mithun Chakraborty; Jaya Prada; Atul Agnihotri; Mamta Kulkarni
- Cinematography: K. V. Ramanna
- Edited by: Sanjay Varma
- Music by: Nadeem-Shravan
- Production company: Bharati Pictures
- Release date: 25 July 1997
- Running time: 140 minutes
- Country: India
- Language: Hindi+Bengali

Jeevan Yudh (in Hindi; transl. War of Life), also known as Jiban Juddho (In Bengali) is a 1997 Indian bilingual neo-noir action thriller film, simultaneously shot in Hindi and Bengali languages, co-written and directed by Partho Ghosh in his debut in Bengali cinema. Produced by Piyush Chakravorthy, it stars Mithun Chakraborty, Raakhee, Jaya Prada, Atul Agnihotri, Mamta Kulkarni, Shakti Kapoor, Rami Reddy and Alok Nath.

== Plot ==
Vasudev Rai lives in a small town with his wife and son, Rohit. Vasudev works as a teacher in a school owned and operated by Gajraj Choudhry. One day, a truck driver named Deva Prakash brings the body of Vasudev to a nearby hospital, and requests the doctor to treat him. The doctor determines that Vasudev is dead, summons the police, and asks Deva to wait until their arrival for his statement. When Deva disappears, he is assumed to be responsible for Vasudev's death. Vasudev's wife and son are devastated. Rohit swears to avenge his father's death and leaves the town. His investigation lets him conclude that the murderer is somewhere near his home town and he returns to find that his town now has a new police in-Charge, Inspector Ajay Kumar. Rohit suspects that Ajay is not who he claims to be and starts making inquiries and unmasks that Ajay is Deva. Accused of killing Vasudev, Deva pleads his innocence but no one believes him. Desperate, he kidnaps Choudhry's daughter Kajal and bolts.

== Cast ==
- Raakhee as Mrs. Rai
- Mithun Chakraborty as Inspector Deva
- Jaya Prada as Rani
- Atul Agnihotri as Rohit Rai
- Mamta Kulkarni as Kajal Chaudhary
- Aloknath as Vasudev Rai
- Shakti Kapoor as Rani's Accomplice
- Mohan Joshi as Gajraj Chaudhary
- Rami Reddy as Madan
- Girija Shankar as Inspector Ajay Kumar

== Soundtrack ==
The music was composed by Nadeem-Shravan and lyrics were written by Sameer.

=== Hindi ===
#	Title	Singer(s)
1	"Kameez Meri Kaali"	Kavita Krishnamurthy, Ila Arun
2	"Sun Sajana Tere Bin"	Alka Yagnik, Babul Supriyo
3	"Zindagi Ko Guzarne Ke Liye"	Pankaj Udhas, Alka Yagnik
4	"Raja Kaise Bethun Tohari"	Sudesh Bhosale, Sadhana Sargam
5	"Tu Hai Meri Dil Ka"	Kavita Krishnamurthy, Nachiketa Chakraborty
6	"Sharm Aane Lagee"	Kavita Krishnamurthy

=== Bengali ===
#	Title	Singer(s)
1	"Jama Amar Kalo"	Kavita Krishnamurthy, Ila Arun
2	"Na Jeyona Durete Ekla"	Babul Supriyo, Alka Yagnik
3	"E Jiban Tomar Jonno"	Abhijeet, Alka Yagnik
4	"Raja Kemne Boshi Tor Ei"	Sudesh Bhosale, Sadhana Sargam
5	"Chor Chor, Maan Prashader"	Kavita Krishnamurthy, Nachiketa Chakraborty
6	"Lajja Keno Elo"	Kavita Krishnamurthy
