= Ravi Behl =

Indian actor and television producer

- Born: 10 May 1966 (age 60); Mumbai, Maharashtra, India
- Occupations: Actor, Producer, Host
- Years active: 1980–2007; 2023–present
- Relatives: Ramesh Behl (uncle); Goldie Behl (first-cousin)
- Family: Behl family

Ravi Behl (born 10 May 1966) is an Indian actor and television producer belonging to Behl family of Hindi films. He is better known for the 1991 film Narsimha and as co-host of dance show Boogie Woogie, that he co-produced with Naved Jaffery for Sony television. He debuted in movies in 1980 with film Morchha, followed by Inteha in 1984.

== Early and personal life ==
He is a son of film producer Shyam Behl. His sister Geeta Behl is an actress who did roles in movies such as Main Tulsi Tere Aangan Ki (1968), Meraa Dost Meraa Dushman (1984), Do Premee (1980) and Zamaane Ko Dikhana Hai (1981). Ravi's father produced movies, such as Duniya (1968) starring Dev Anand and Vyjayanthimala, and The Gold Medal (1969) starring Jeetendra, Rakhee Gulzar, and Shatrughan Sinha.

Behl, who remains unmarried, had said in an interview, "A lot of people are surprised that I'm still unmarried. It's not that I haven't tried. I was seeing a girl for a long time but unfortunately, our relationship didn't blossom into marriage. We had our differences."

== Career ==
Ravi made his acting debut with Raj Babbar in film Inteha in 1984. He worked in popular films, such as Narsimha (1991) with Sunny Deol and Urmila Matondkar, Dalaal (1993) with Mithun Chakraborty and Ayesha Jhulka; Agni Sakshi (1996) with Jackie Shroff, Nana Patekar and Manisha Koirala; and Ghulam-E-Mustafa (1997) with Nana Patekar and Raveena Tandon. He also acted in a British TV mini series based on the novel The Far Pavilions.

After his career in movies fade he became the co-producer and host of Boogie Woogie (1996–2014) an Indian television dance show. Ravi, who was once in financial trouble, Tellychakkar, found financial security through his work in television.

== Professional works ==
Year	Film	Role	Language	Notes
1980	Morchha	Chhotu	Hindi	
1984	Inteha		Hindi	
1984	The Far Pavilions	Prince Nandu	English	British TV mini series
1986	Avinash	Sumit	Hindi	
1991	Narsimha	Ravi Rastogi	Hindi	first break as a lead pair
1993	Boy Friend	Raja	Hindi	
1993	Dalaal	Inder Jhunjhunwala	Hindi	
1994	Pyar Ka Rog		Hindi	
1995	Meri Mohabbat Mera Naseeba		Hindi	
1996	Agni Sakshi	Ravi Kapoor	Hindi	
1996–2014	Boogie Woogie	Himself	Hindi	Sony TV
1997	Ghulam-E-Mustafa	Arun	Hindi	
1999	Sarfarosh-E-Hind		Hindi	
2007	Salaam Bacche	Coach	Hindi	
2023	The Night Manager	Jaiveer "Jayu" Singh	Hindi	Disney+ Hotstar
2026	The Pyramid Scheme	Daljeet Singh	Hindi	Prime Video

== See also ==
- List of Hindi film families
