= Boogie Woogie (Indian TV series) =

- Created by: Naved Jaffrey; Ravi Behl
- Directed by: Naved Jaffrey
- Country of origin: India
- Original language: Hindi
- No. of seasons: 7

Production
- Editor: Umma Mishrra (Season 6)
- Running time: 30 minutes
- Production companies: R&N TV Productions

Original release
- Network: Sony Entertainment Television
- Release: 1996 – 30 March 2014

Boogie Woogie was an Indian dance competition television series created and directed by Naved Jaffrey, Ashu Jain and Ravi Behl for Sony Entertainment Television. Debuting in 1996, the show was judged by Indian film actor and television host Javed Jaffrey, who was the permanent judge. It is the oldest dance reality and it has become the longest running show in India. In the earlier seasons, the judges assigned various themes to episodes, including Bollywood, Horror, Friendship among others. It was also co-hosted by Kadambari Shantshri Desai from season 1 to 2.

== Background ==
The popularity of the dance show has led to the creation of special championship shows, such as Kids' Championships, Teen Championships, Mothers Championships and Celebrity Championships, in which various Indian celebrities, such as Mithun Chakraborty, Juhi Chawla, Esha Deol, Dia Mirza, Govinda, Vivek Oberoi and Ritesh Deshmukh have participated.

== Seasons ==
=== Season 1 ===
The series' first season premiered in 1996 and ended in 2001.

=== Season 2 ===
After a long gap of 5–6 years, the show was relaunched by Sony Entertainment Television in 2003 for its 2^{nd} season. After the end of season 2, Boogie Woogie was off air for sometime in 2006, before it came back in a new avatar in 2008.

During this period, Sony Entertainment Television Asia in London launched the International Boogie Woogie championships. The judging format of this show was created by Samir Bhamra.

=== Season 3 ===
The show held auditions for its new season contestants from 16 to 20 February 2008 in Mumbai. The new season began on Sony Entertainment Television Asia in mid-March. In the end of February or in the beginning of March 2008, the name of series was prefixed with "Videocon" under a sponsorship deal and was titled Boogie Woogie Little Champs.

=== Season 4 ===
After the end of the third season, its fourth season was launched in the last week of November 2008.

=== Season 5 ===
After the end of its fourth season, Sony Entertainment Television again launched the series for its fifth season on 29 May 2009, named Boogie Woogie Mummy's Championship. The series was continuously telecast from February or March 2008 to 3 October 2009, and was replaced by the new dance series Dance Premier League from 9 October 2009. However, the series was said to be return after Dance Premier League ends.

=== Season 6: 2010 ===
And the series really returned from 19 May 2010 as its sixth season. This season was telecast bi-weekly . Its Grand Finale was telecast on 13 August 2010.

== Franchise ==
After completion of seventh season of the show, the show was franchised to Nepal. The rights and necessary requirements was done by AP1 TV of Nepal to import the show. Boogie Woogie Nepal is Nepal's first international franchised dance reality show.

== Winners ==
- Dharmesh Yelande (season 4)
- Renu Rana (Inaugural season – Mother's Championship)
- Sabah Bari (season 5)
- Sachi Sharma Utah dance group (season 3)
- Neil Bhatt (Fast Forward Round)
- Farhad Shahnawaz
- Suparna Sarkar (2006 & 2007)
- David Furtado & Sharon Noronha (Goa)
- Priya Adivarekar (season 1 and 2)
- Phulwa Khamkar (season 1)
- Fictitious Dance Group (season 1)
- Jaykumar Nair (season 3)
- Nikhil Mishra and Sachin Dawle (season 3 – Teen Championship)
- Mini and Group (season 1 and 2)
- Kritika Rohira (season 2)
- Yogesh Pathak and company (season 1 and 2)
- Jayshree and group (season 1 and 2)
- Keshav Rathi (season 2)
- Pradnya Autade (season 7)
- Vaishnavi Patil (season 4 and 5)
- Bodyrock Dance Academy, Baroda
- Amey Pandya as Contestant (Season 6)
- Damini Karmerkar
- Ruju Parekh (season 1)
- Neha Marda

== See also ==
- Jhalak Dikhhla Jaa
- Nach Baliye
