= Dalaal =

- Release poster
- Directed by: Partho Ghosh
- Written by: Kaushal Bharati (story); Tarun Ghosh (screenplay); Anwar Khan
- Produced by: Prakash Mehra
- Starring: Mithun Chakraborty; Ayesha Jhulka
- Cinematography: N. Satyen
- Edited by: Shyam Gupte
- Music by: Bappi Lahiri
- Production company: Prakash Mehra Productions
- Distributed by: Eros Entertainment
- Release dates: 22 October 1993 (Bengali); 29 October 1993 (Hindi)
- Country: India
- Languages: Bengali; Hindi

Dalaal is a 1993 Indian bilingual action film simultaneously shot in Bengali and Hindi languages directed by Partho Ghosh. Produced by Prakash Mehra under his banner of Prakash Mehra Productions, the film is based on a short story by Kaushal Bharati. It stars Mithun Chakraborty, Ayesha Jhulka and Raj Babbar in lead roles, while Tinnu Anand, Shakti Kapoor, Ravi Behl, Satyen Kappu, Indrani Banerjee, Tarun Ghosh and Ravi Behl play another pivotal roles. The film fetched good initial box-office collection primarily due to the songs composed by Bappi Lahiri. It was the eighth highest grossing Bollywood film of 1993.

== Synopsis ==
Dalaal is the story of the illiterate Bhola, who escorts young women to meet with their brothers. Bhola is enthusiastic and works diligently to earn the respect of everyone around him; but one day, during the course of his duties, he meets a beautiful woman named Roopali, who makes him understand the true nature of his job: that of a pimp. Whether Bhola will realize his mistake and redeem himself forms the climax.

== Cast ==
- Mithun Chakraborty as Bhola
- Ayesha Jhulka as Roopali
- Raj Babbar as Jagannath Tripathi
- Tinu Anand as Chaku Singh
- Shakti Kapoor as Jhunjhunwala
- Rita Bhaduri as Mrs. Jhunjhunwala
- Ravi Behl as Inder Jhunjhunwala
- Indrani Banerjee as Radha
- Tarun Ghosh as Bangali
- Deb Mukherjee as Girdhari
- Mangal Dhillon as Jagga
- Satyendra Kapoor as Chatriprasad
- Suresh Chatwal as Inspector Tambe
- Vikas Anand as Bhola's Father
- Prem Kumar (unnamed role)
- Ramji as dancer in "Gutur Gutur" song
- Bhanu Khan as dancer in "Gutur Gutur" song

== Soundtrack ==
The music of this movie was well appreciated with hit numbers like "Gutur Gutur" and was one of the final hit albums composed by Bappi Lahiri for a Mithun Chakraborty movie.

=== Hindi Version ===
#	Song	Singer
1.	"Gutur Gutur"	Kumar Sanu, Bappi Lahiri, Alka Yagnik, Ila Arun
2.	"Chori Chori Maine Bhi To"	Kumar Sanu, Kavita Krishnamurthy
3.	"Na Unees Se Kam"	Kumar Sanu
4.	"Thahre Huye Paani Mein" (Male)	Kumar Sanu
5.	"Mar Gaye Mar Gaye"	Udit Narayan, Alka Yagnik
6.	"Mere Ramji Mere Bhagwanji"	Kumar Sanu, Alka Yagnik
7.	"Thahre Huye Paani Mein" (Female)	Sadhana Sargam

=== Bengali Version ===
Song	Singer
"Nithor Joler Buk"	Kumar Sanu
"Bakam Bakam"	Kumar Sanu, Bappi Lahiri, Alka Yagnik, Ila Arun
"Chupi Chupi Aami O To"	Kumar Sanu, Kavita Krishnamurthy
"Sundori Jole Gelo Jole Gelo"	Udit Narayan, Alka Yagnik
"Na Uneser Kom"	Kumar Sanu
"Nithor Joler Buk"	Sadhana Sargam
"Probhu Ramhe Bhogobanhe"	Kumar Sanu, Alka Yagnik

== Reception ==
Dalaal received acclaim due to its music. Dalaal was among the super-hit films of 1993.
