= Pyar Ka Rog =

- Directed by: Akashdeep Sabir
- Starring: Ravi Behl; Sheeba
- Music by: Bappi Lahiri
- Release date: 29 April 1994
- Country: India
- Language: Hindi

Pyar Ka Rog is a 1994 Bollywood film written and directed by Akashdeep Sabir. The film stars Ravi Behl, Sheeba, Shammi Kapoor, Anupam Kher, Bindu in the lead roles, with Vinod Khanna, Sanjay Dutt, Chunky Pandey, Archana Puran Singh made their guest appearances.

== Plot ==
The story revolves around Ravi Singh, a college student who falls in love with his classmate Reema Sharma. Their relationship grows despite a few initial misunderstandings, and Ravi introduces Reema to his father, Colonel Udhay Singh, a retired army officer. Udhay approves of their relationship and seems happy for his son.

However, things take a complicated turn when Colonel Singh meets a nurse named Mohini Sharma, who is hired to care for him after he injures his leg. Unexpectedly, a romantic bond develops between Udhay and Mohini.

The real twist comes when Reema finds out that Mohini is actually her mother, a woman who had left the family years earlier under controversial circumstances. This revelation causes emotional turmoil between Reema and Ravi, as they struggle to come to terms with their parents’ unexpected relationship.

== Cast ==
- Ravi Behl as Ravi Singh
- Sheeba as Reema Sharma
- Shammi Kapoor as Colonel Kapoor
- Anupam Kher as Colonel Udham Singh
- Bindu as Mohini Sharma
- Vinod Khanna as Army Officer (Guest Appearance)
- Sanjay Dutt as Self (Guest Appearance)
- Chunky Pandey as Self (Guest Appearance)
- Archana Puran Singh as Archana (Guest Appearance)

== Soundtrack ==
The music was composed by Bappi Lahiri and the lyrics were penned by Rani Malik.

1. "I Love You" - Pankaj Udhas
2. "Dil Pe Hai Tera Naam" - Udit Narayan, Kavita Krishnamurthy
3. "Ja Ja Ke Kahan Minnaten Fariyad Karoge" - Kumar Sanu, Alka Yagnik
4. "Tana Nana Tana Nana" - Bappi Lahiri, Sharon Prabhakar
5. "Tum Ho Bilkul Buddhu" - Babla Mehta, Debashish Dasgupta, Bela Sulakhe
