= Maha Shaktishaali =

Maha Shaktishaali महा शक्तिशाली
- Directed by: K. Pappu
- Written by: Ranbir Pushp; Laxmikant Sharma; Madan Joshi
- Produced by: Ratan Mohan
- Starring: Dharmendra; Ayesha Jhulka
- Cinematography: Shripad Natu
- Edited by: Kuldip Mehan
- Music by: Anand–Milind
- Production company: R. M. Art Productions
- Release date: 15 April 1994
- Country: India
- Language: Hindi

Maha Shaktishaali is a 1994 Bollywood action drama film directed by K. Pappu and produced by Ratan Mohan. The film was released under the banner of R. M. Art Productions on 15 April 1994.

== Plot ==
This is the story on an honest truck driver Jaswant. His best friend turns out an underworld kingpin. He fights against his old friend and other criminals for justice.

== Cast ==
- Dharmendra as Jaswant " Jassi" Singh
- Amrish Puri as Dhanna " DJ" Singh
- Anupam Kher as Inspector Prakash Varma
- Ayesha Jhulka as Poonam
- Avinash Wadhawan as Manohar
- Sonu Walia as Ananya
- Alok Nath as Minister Ramkishan
- Tej Sapru as Pratap
- Gulshan Grover as Rakesh

== Soundtrack ==
#	Title	Singer(s)
1	"Chori Chori Lag Gayee"	Suresh Wadkar, Sadhana Sargam
2	"Main Hosh Mein Nahin Hoon"	Suresh Wadkar
3	"Kamli Han Tere Pyar Mein"	Mohammad Aziz, Sadhana Sargam
4	"Main Hosh Mein Nahin Hoon"	Kavita Krishnamurthy
5	"Daud Ke Aaya Main"	Mohammad Aziz, Mangal Singh
6	"Mohabbat Mein Itne Karib Aagaye"	Udit Narayan, Sadhana Sargam
7	"Chal Meri Chhappan Chhuri"	Amit Kumar
