= Hai Meri Jaan =

- Promotional Poster
- Directed by: Roopesh Kumar
- Produced by: Roopesh Kumar
- Starring: Sunil Dutt; Hema Malini; Kumar Gaurav; Ayesha Jhulka; Nirupa Roy
- Music by: Bappi Lahiri
- Release date: 4 October 1991
- Country: India
- Language: Hindi

Hai Meri Jaan is a 1991 Indian Hindi-language film produced and directed by Roopesh Kumar. It stars Sunil Dutt, Hema Malini, Kumar Gaurav, Ayesha Jhulka, Nirupa Roy in pivotal roles.

== Plot ==
Reshma (Hema Malini) and her younger brother Bunty (Kumar Gaurav) are orphaned at a young age. Reshma makes many sacrifices so that Bunty can become successful. Bunty falls in love with Neelam (Ayesha Jhulka) and they get married. Reshma welcomes them. They try to live happily together but Neelam thinks Reshma is bossy. They face several complications.

== Cast ==
- Sunil Dutt as Telegramwala
- Hema Malini as Reshma
- Kumar Gaurav as Bunty
- Ayesha Jhulka as Neelam
- Navneet Nishan as Nikki
- Nirupa Roy as Rani Saheba Neelam's Grandmother
- Krishan Dhawan as Rahim Chacha
- Anil Dhawan as Gulshan
- Bharat Bhushan as Father of Reshma and Bunty
- Roopesh Kumar as Prajapati, Servant of Rani Saheba
- Raza Murad as Malhotra, Guest Appearance

== Songs ==
- "Tere Chehre Ko Mila Rang" – Anuradha Paudwal, Mohammad Aziz
- "Oye Mikanto" – Anuradha Paudwal, Bappi Lahiri
- "Kahan Chali Ae Nazneen" – Mohammad Aziz
- "Ghunghat Mera Jane Kya Hua" – Asha Bhosle, Shabbir Kumar
- "Hai Meri Jaan" – Anuradha Paudwal, Bappi Lahiri
- "Maine Tumko Dil Diya Hai Jaanam" – Anuradha Paudwal, Bappi Lahiri
- "Kya Baat Hai Meri Aankhon Mein" – Anuradha Paudwal
- "He Jaanam Main Diwani Tu Diwana" – Anuradha Paudwal, Bappi Lahiri
- "Maine Tujhko" (sad) – Anuradha Paudwal, Bappi Lahiri
