= Katha Dilam =

- DVD cover
- Directed by: Rajat Das
- Produced by: N. S. S. Film Concern
- Starring: Prosenjit Chatterjee; Ayesha Jhulka
- Music by: Ajoy Das
- Release date: 12 April 1991
- Country: India
- Language: Bengali

Katha Dilam is a 1991 Bengali film directed by Rajat Das and produced by N. S. S. Film Concern under the banner of N. S. S. Film Concern. It features Prosenjit Chatterjee and Ayesha Jhulka in the lead roles. Music of the film has been composed by Ajoy Das.

== Cast ==
- Prosenjit Chatterjee as Sanjay
- Ayesha Jhulka as Anita Chatterjee
- Shakuntala Barua as Mrs. Sunita Chatterjee
- Sukhen Das as Ranga
- Sumitra Mukherjee as Sanjay's Mother
- Soumitra Banerjee as Jibon Dutt
- N. Vishwanathan as Satya Sen

== Songs ==
- "Katha Dilam" –

Asha Bhosle

- "Premke Aami Bhalobashi" -

Amit Kumar

- "I Am Romeo" -

Amit Kumar, Kavita Krishnamurthy

- "Maake Je Bhoy Kore" -

Kavita Krishnamurthy
