= Ikke Pe Ikka =

1994 film by Raj Sippy

- Directed by: Raj N. Sippy
- Written by: Ajay Kartik, Anand Vardhan (dialogues)
- Screenplay by: Sachin Bhowmick
- Story by: Pankaj Dheer
- Produced by: Satluj Dheer
- Starring: Akshay Kumar; Shantipriya; Chandni
- Cinematography: S. Pappu
- Edited by: Mohinder Ashish
- Music by: Mahesh Kishore
- Production company: Mudra Arts
- Release date: 21 October 1994
- Language: Hindi
- Budget: ₹1 crore
- Box office: ₹9.35 crore

Ikke Pe Ikka is a 1994 Indian Hindi action film directed by Raj N. Sippy. It stars Akshay Kumar, Shantipriya, Moushumi Chatterjee, Anupam Kher and Chandni in lead roles.

== Plot ==
Three brothers announce their engagement to three sisters, but the boys' father believes that all six are too irresponsible to get married, and subsequently proposes to the girls' mother in order to sabotage their plans.

== Cast ==
- Akshay Kumar as Rajiv
- Moushumi Chatterjee as Kaushalya Devi
- Shantipriya as Komal
- Chandni as Kavita
- Pankaj Dheer as Randhir
- Prithvi as Rishi Kumar
- Anupam Kher as Kailashnath
- Shafi Inamdar as Iqbal
- Tiku Talsania as Dr. Topiwala
- Guddi Maruti as Guddi
- Sudhir as Police Inspector Jai
- Harish Patel as Bajrangi
- Sushmita Mukherjee as Kuntiputhri Kuku
- Bhushan Jeevan as Kuntiputhra Mahender
- Shiva Rindani as Kunthiputra 2
- John Gabriel as Dilawar
- Paintal as Tuli
- Beena as Zareena
- Hemant Birje (Friendly Appearance) as Pehelwan

== Soundtracks ==
#	Title	Singer(s)
1	"Kab Raat Aye Haaye"	Devaki Pandit
2	"Maine Likh Di Jawani"	Vipin Sachdeva, Kavita Krishnamurthy
3	"Sawan Ki Boodein"	Vipin Sachdeva, Kavita Krishnamurthy
4	"Sounga Na Sone Doonga"	Kumar Sanu
5	"Tera Dekh Ke Roop"	Vipin Sachdeva, Kavita Krishnamurthy
6	"Tere Khayal Mein"	Hariharan, Vinod Rathod, Vipin Sachdeva
