= Mohabbat Ki Kasam =

- Film poster
- Directed by: K. Pappu
- Written by: Mohan Singh Baggad (story), Madan Joshi (dialogue) and K. Pappu (screenplay)
- Produced by: Sohan Singh Billa
- Cinematography: Sushil Chopra
- Edited by: Deepak Pal
- Music by: Kamalkant
- Production company: P. B. Pictures
- Release date: 1986
- Country: India
- Language: Hindi

Mohabbat Ki Kasam (Hindi: मोहब्बत की कसम) is a 1986 Bollywood action melodrama film directed by K. Pappu. It stars Amjad Khan, Kulbhushan Kharbanda and Tanuja, with special appearances from two of Bollywood's biggest stars, Dharmendra and Rajesh Khanna. Produced by P. B. Pictures, it features music by Kamalkant. The lyricist was Kulwant Jani. The director of photography was Sushil Chopra, the film also features Vinod Mehra, Shoma Anand, Moon Moon Sen, Anita Raj, Paintal and Imtiaz Khan, forming an ensemble cast.

== Plot ==
Two brothers, Thakur Vikram Singh (Kulbhushan Kharbanda), and Baseera Singh (Amjad Khan) live in the same village. Baseera is resentful that Vikram has got all he ever wanted, the estate, the wealth, the title, and lovely wife (Kaushalya Tanuja). Baseera, unable to control his anger, kills one of Vikram's men, and is sentenced to be hanged until death. Baseera leaves the legacy of revenge and hatred with his son, Jageera. Vikram undertakes to look after his nephew as his own, and he already has a son. Additionally, Vikram also adopts a boy as his son.

Jageera, now grown up, backlashes against the family; Vikram's son is killed, and the adopted son is accused of having sexual relationship with Vikram's daughter-in-law. And the person to pronounce the sentence is non other than fair-minded and generous Thakur Vikram Singh.

== Cast ==
- Amjad Khan as Basheera Singh
- Kulbhushan Kharbanda as Thakur Vikram Singh
- Tanuja as Kaushalya Singh
- Rajesh Khanna as Krishna
- Moon Moon Sen as Radha
- Dharmendra as Shop-owner
- Anita Raj as Shop-owner's Wife
- Vinod Mehra as Dancer / Singer
- Shoma Anand as Dancer / Singer
- Master Bhagwan as a Dancer
- Paintal as Professor Lallu
- Imtiaz Khan as Raghu
- Rajesh Puri as a Dancer

== Soundtrack ==
The lyrics were written by Kulwant Jani who was active from 1970s-90s and had written lyrics for films like Ramanand Sagar's Lalkaar (1972), Anand Sagar's Hamrahi (1972), O. P. Ralhan's Paapi (1977), and Tarachand Barjatya's Ek Baar Kaho (1980). Music director was Kamalkant, with playback singing provided by Mohammed Aziz, Mahendra Kapoor, Shabbir Kumar, Alka Yagnik and Shailendra Singh.

=== Songlist ===
Song	Singer
"Tere Mere Pyar Ka"	Mohammed Aziz
"Jahan Pasina Gire Yaar Ka"	Shabbir Kumar, Shailendra Singh
"Rabba Rabba, Dil Gaya"	Shabbir Kumar, Alka Yagnik
"Dil Ka Tarana Tarana Gayenge Hum Tum"	Shabbir Kumar, Alka Yagnik
"Nazar Se Pilaane Ka Vaada"	Mahendra Kapoor, Alka Yagnik
