= Teesra Kaun =

Teesra Kaun?
- Poster
- Directed by: Partho Ghosh
- Written by: K. K. Singh
- Based on: No.20 Madras Mail by Dennis Joseph
- Produced by: N. N. Sippy
- Starring: Chunky Pandey; Mithun Chakraborty; Amol Palekar; Satish Shah; Rakesh Bedi
- Cinematography: K. V. Ramanna
- Edited by: R. Rajendran
- Music by: Anand–Milind
- Production company: N N Sippy Productions
- Distributed by: Tips Music
- Release date: 23 December 1994
- Country: India
- Language: Hindi

Teesra Kaun? (transl: Who is the third person?) is a 1994 Indian Hindi language comedy action thriller film directed by Partho Ghosh. The film is a remake of the 1990 Malayalam film No.20 Madras Mail, directed by Joshiy and starring Mohanlal. It features Chunky Pandey, Mithun Chakraborty, Amol Palekar, Satish Shah, and Rakesh Bedi.

== Plot ==
The story revolves around a train journey in Howrah-Bombay Mail. Three Bollywood-stricken, Nagpur-based slackers, Vijay Verma, Bhring Nagpurkar, and Khoka Ganguli board the Howrah-Bombay Mail, to head to Bombay to watch a cricket match and to meet Bollywood actor Mithun Chakraborty.

During this trip, they drank a lot of alcohol. Vijay notices that the people in the next room in his train coach are a couple with an attractive young woman. He goes over to introduce himself and finds that the man calls himself Mr. D.K. Kadam (Amol Palekar), and the young woman's name is Manjula. Vijay wants to change his seat so that he can be near Manjula, but unfortunately, that seat is taken up by a young man, Pankaj Nigam. Vijay attempts to forcibly take the seat from Pankaj, and a fight ensues, and Vijay is asked to leave them alone. During a stopover, Pankaj leaves the train, and when the train starts, Mr. Kadam finds that Manjula has been killed.

The police begin their investigation, and they have two suspects, namely, Pankaj Nigam and Vijay Verma. They also find out that Pankaj is not who he claims to be, and that his real name is Sanjay Chopra. Further investigations prove that neither Vijay nor Pankaj could have possibly murdered Aisha Manjula, leaving the police, Vijay and his friends on one hand, and Sanjay Chopra, to hunt for the third suspect (i.e. Teesra Kaun?), the one who actually killed Manjula, and the one who may also kill anyone who stands in his/her way. Further, Mithun helps his all fans in every way. After a huge fight, it is revealed that the man who was pretending to be the father of Manjula was the murderer of Manjula's father and he blackmailed them. Finally, on confrontation with Mithun, Sanjay, and Vijay, Dr. Kadam confesses that he is the actual murderer of Manjula but he confidently states that they cannot do him any harm legally since he is spotless in the eyes of the law. Seeing this, Manjula's helpless mother shoots him dead as revenge for her daughter's murder, at the railway station in front of the police inspector who had come to arrest Dr. Kadam. She is then taken into custody by the police as the film ends with the comical trio resuming their activities once again.

== Cast ==
- Chunky Pandey as Vijay Verma
- Mithun Chakraborty as Himself
- Amol Palekar as C. K. Kadam
- Rituparna Sengupta as Manjula
- Javed Jaffrey as Sanjay Chopra
- Somy Ali as Priyanka
- Satish Shah as Bhring Nagpurkar
- Rakesh Bedi as Khoka Ganguli
- Sadashiv Amrapurkar as Inspector Aditya Talwar
- Tinnu Anand as P. K. Rasiya
- Avtar Gill as Rana Saxena
- Shah Rukh Khan as Shanti Verma
- Beena Banerjee as Manjula's mother (as Beena)
- K.D. Chandran as Mr. Verma
- Sheeba Akashdeep as herself, in item song Teesra Kaun
- Gautami as herself (guest appearance)
- Anil Dhawan as Anil Saxena (special appearance)
- Shashi Kiran as Film producer
- K.K Raj as a waiter in a train
- Ramesh Goyal as coolie on Akola station

== Soundtrack ==
#	Song	Singer
1.	"Band Bajega Dhol Bajenge"	Udit Narayan, Bela Sulakhe
2.	"Dekha Tujhe Toh Dil Gaane Laga"	Bali Brahmbhatt, Suneeta Rao
3.	"Humein Tumse Pyar Tha"	Abhijeet Bhattacharya, Sadhana Sargam
4.	"Jab Maine Tera Naam Liya"	Udit Narayan, Bela Sulakhe
5.	"Kya Aankhen Hai"	Abhijeet Bhattacharya, Alka Yagnik
6.	"Teesra Kaun"	Abhijeet Bhattacharya, Poornima
7.	"Love In Rain"	Kumar Sanu, Poornima
