= Rehmat Ali =

2010 Indian Bengali film

- CD Cover of Rehmat Ali
- Directed by: Partho Ghosh
- Produced by: Raj Behl; Geeta Behl
- Starring: Mithun Chakraborty; Rituparna Sengupta
- Cinematography: N Natarajan Subramaniam
- Music by: Bappi Lahiri
- Release date: 26 February 2010
- Running time: 145 minutes
- Country: India
- Language: Bengali

Rehmat Ali is a 2010 Indian Bengali-language action crime film directed by Partho Ghosh for producers Raj Behl and Geeta Behl, starring Mithun Chakraborty, Rituparna Sengupta and Roopa Ganguly. It marked the return of Chakraborty to the Bengali film industry after a long gap. It is a remake of Partho's 1997 Bollywood film Ghulam-E-Musthafa which itself was remade from 1996 Tamil film Musthaffaa.

== Plot ==
The story follows a hitman and right-hand man to a mafia boss named Rahmat Ali (Mithun Chakraborty). Ruthless toward his enemies, he sees his life transformed when he falls in love with a young woman named Sapna. Following a series of tragic events, Rahmat decides to leave his criminal past behind, dedicating his life to protecting an innocent family and seeking redemption for his past sins.

== Cast ==
- Mithun Chakraborty as Rahmat Ali
- Rituparna Sengupta
- Roopa Ganguly
- Biswajit Chakraborty
- Rajatava Dutta
- Biswanath
- Jayanta Dutta Burman
- Sanchita Nandi

== Songs ==
Lyrics have been written by Lipi and Bijoy Bhakat.

- "Sundori Sundori" – Shaan
- "Moja Dekhabo" – Bappi Lahiri
- "Saiyaan Bina Ghar Suna" – Sunidhi Chauhan
- "Tumi Amar Ami Tomar" – Shaan, Bappi Lahiri, Alka Yagnik
- "Joy Kali Joy Kali" – Sadhana Sargam, Chinton
- "Saiyaan Bina Ghar Suna (Remix)" – Madhushree

== Box office ==
Rehmat Ali could not repeat the success of the original Tamil film and ended up as an average success at the box office.
