= 100 Days (1991 film) =

- Poster
- Directed by: Partho Ghosh
- Written by: Bhushan Banmali (dialogue); Devjyoti Roy (screenplay)
- Based on: Nooravathu Naal by Manivannan
- Produced by: Jay Mehta
- Starring: Jackie Shroff; Madhuri Dixit; Moon Moon Sen; Javed Jaffrey
- Cinematography: Arvind Laad
- Edited by: R. Rajendran
- Music by: Raamlaxman
- Production company: Prathima Films
- Distributed by: Jayvijay Enterprises
- Release date: 31 May 1991
- Running time: 157 minutes
- Country: India
- Language: Hindi
- Budget: ₹0.95 crore (equivalent to ₹8.9 crore or US$930,000 in 2026)
- Box office: ₹8.9 crore (equivalent to ₹84 crore or US$8.7 million in 2026)

100 Days is a 1991 Indian Hindi-language psychological thriller film, starring Jackie Shroff, Madhuri Dixit, Moon Moon Sen and Javed Jaffrey. The film's plot follows the mysterious events in the life of a woman with extrasensory perception. It is a remake of the 1984 Tamil film Nooravathu Naal, which itself is an unofficial adaptation of the 1977 Italian giallo film Sette note in nero (English Title: The Psychic or Seven Notes in Black) and the American film Eyes of Laura Mars.

== Plot ==
The film opens with a young woman, Devi (Madhuri Dixit), who gets sudden visions (usually accompanied by a mild panic attack) of incidents and accidents that are yet to happen. Devi has a vision of her sister Rama (Moon Moon Sen) being murdered. Her college friends Sudha Mathur (Sabeeha) and Sunil (Javed Jaffrey) try to help her sort through her visions, but to little avail. Devi is relieved after she talks to her sister and finds that she is alive. However, just some time later, Rama is murdered in the same way as Devi had sensed. The murderer hides Rama's body in the wall of her mansion. Rama is reported missing. Devi firmly believes Rama is dead. Five years later, Devi moves to her uncle (Ajit Vachani)'s home, where she eventually meets and is courted by millionaire businessman Ram Kumar (Jackie Shroff). Sunil, who has secretly been in love with Devi, is deeply hurt. Devi and Ram marry and move to his family's mansion, which he has regained after a legal battle. Little known to anybody, this is the same mansion where Rama is entombed. When Devi starts having the visions again, Rama's skeleton is not the only thing that will come tumbling out.

Devi sees a wall in the mansion and tears it down, only to find a skeleton with a necklace tumbling out of it. Devi knows whose skeleton it is, as Rama had a necklace similar to Devi's. Also, the skeleton is roughly the same height as that of Rama. The Inspector (Shivaji Satam) quickly points out that since the mansion was closed when Rama disappeared, anyone could have hidden a dead body there, and nobody would know the truth. However, he doubts that the dead woman is Rama: several such necklaces are available for purchase.

Devi gets a premonition of another woman being murdered. She also points out two details: a magazine named Priya with a horse on its cover and a video cassette labelled 100 Days. Sunil and Devi visit the weekly magazine office. The editor (Shashi Kiran) politely informs them that the next six months' covers do not feature any equestrian theme whatsoever. The video cassette clue, too, is a dead end: no video store in Bombay carries any such title as '100 Days'. Devi begins delving into Rama's life. She learns that Rama was a research scholar and was working on a thesis about ancient sculptures and temples in India. A quick investigation by Devi during a visit to the Bombay Museum reveals that many artifacts listed by Rama either had mysteriously disappeared, had been stolen, or were replaced by fakes. She also learns that two people working in the museum, Security Officer Jagmohan (Jai Kalgutkar) and records keeper Parvati (Neelam Mehra), were fired on suspicion. Parvati is revealed to be the victim in Devi's recent visions.

Jagmohan is a hot-headed man. Parvati knows Rama's killer and had videotaped the murder. She tries to blackmail the murderer, but the murderer tries to kill her. She sneaks into a video library, sticks a label '100 days' on the cassette, and tries to escape. Soon Jagmohan succeeds in killing her, just as Devi had seen. Later, due to last-minute developments, the weekly magazine 'Priya' prints an issue with a horse on its cover. Devi soon realises that Parvati has been murdered. She goes to the video library and retrieves the video cassette. Jagmohan tries to kill her, but her luck prevails and she escapes. She comes back into the mansion, where she gets a vision of herself in an injured state and a broken mirror in the mansion. She tells Ram about the developments and sits with him to watch the video cassette. Ram has no idea about the cassette's contents.

However, as the video cassette is being played, Devi gets another shock: she sees her sister Rama confronting Ram. Based on the evidence in the video cassette, it seems that Ram is the murderer. Devi tells him that she is pregnant with his child. Ram offers to explain about Rama. Ram says that he was from an affluent family, but his father lost all his wealth to gambling and eventually died. When Ram sought financial help from his relatives, they spurned his requests, leaving him helplessly alone. Consequently, he took to illegal ways of earning money. He ran into Jagmohan and Parvati. Later, the trio became partners and started smuggling the artifacts from museums and replacing them with fakes. Rama suspected it and decided to expose them. That night, Ram went to talk to Rama. But Jagmohan, who was also there, lost his temper and shot her dead. Parvati was secretly taping the incident, but due to her camera's angle, it looked as if Ram was the killer. Ram offers to surrender to the police and phones them. He confesses his crime and asks them to come to his place.

No sooner has he stopped talking than Jagmohan stabs him in his back. Ram loses consciousness, while Devi fights with Jagmohan. In this unequal fight, Devi is overpowered and rendered unconscious after being hit on her forehead by a conch hurled at her by Jagmohan. Jagmohan immures her in the same wall where he had buried Rama. Just as he is about to escape, he sees Sunil coming in. Jagmohan hides, while Sunil is surprised to see the mansion unlocked with nobody inside. Just then, Devi's wristwatch alarm chimes. Sunil is surprised to hear the sound coming from behind the wall and puts two and two together. He starts removing the bricks of the freshly constructed wall when Jagmohan attacks him. Sunil puts up a fight and is able to defeat him. Ram wakes up too and goes towards the wall to remove the bricks, and manages to bring the unconscious Devi from the wall. Sunil soon overpowers Jagmohan and dumps him into the swimming pool.

The police arrive at the scene. Sunil is surprised to see Ram being arrested as well. Devi looks wearily as the police van leaves with Jagmohan and Ram in custody.

== Cast ==
- Jackie Shroff as Ram Kumar
- Madhuri Dixit as Devi
- Moon Moon Sen as Rama
- Javed Jaffrey as Sunil
- Laxmikant Berde as Balam
- Vijay Arora as Doctor
- Shivaji Satam as Police Inspector Rana Pratap
- Ajit Vachani as Devi's Uncle
- Jai Kalgutkar as Jagmohan
- Neelam Mehra as Parvati
- Sabeeha as Sudha Mathur
- Mahavir Shah as Mr. Arvind Mathur

== Soundtrack ==
Song	Singer
"Sun Beliya Shukriya Meharbani"	Lata Mangeshkar, S. P. Balasubrahmanyam
"Sun Sun Sun Sun Sun Dilruba"	Lata Mangeshkar, S. P. Balasubrahmanyam
"Tana Dere Na Tana Na De Sundari"	Lata Mangeshkar, S. P. Balasubrahmanyam
"Pyar Tera Pyar"	Lata Mangeshkar
"Le Le Dil, De De Dil"	Lata Mangeshkar, Amit Kumar
"Gabbar Singh Yeh"	Amit Kumar, Alka Yagnik

== Awards and nominations ==
- Laxmikant Berde was nominated for Filmfare Award for Best Performance in a Comic Role for his role in the film.
