= Mr. Azaad =

- Directed by: T. Rama Rao
- Written by: Anees Bazmee
- Story by: R. Parthiban
- Based on: Ulle Veliye by R. Parthiban
- Produced by: Vishal Nihalani
- Starring: Anil Kapoor; Chandni
- Cinematography: Siba Mishra
- Edited by: Nand Kumar
- Music by: Bappi Lahiri
- Release date: 23 December 1994
- Country: India
- Language: Hindi

Mr. Azaad is a 1994 Indian Hindi-language film directed by T. Rama Rao and produced by Vishal Nihalani. The film stars Anil Kapoor and Chandni. It is a remake of the Tamil film Ulle Veliye (1993).

== Description ==
Azaad, an orphan, takes to petty crime and acts like a modern-day Robin Hood. However, the death of an honest constable causes him to take stock of his actions

== Cast ==
- Anil Kapoor as Azaad
- Chandni as Roopa
- Niki Aneja as Inspector Shalu
- Raj Babbar as Union Leader Satyaprakash (Azaad's father)
- Deepti Naval as Mrs.Satyaprakash (Azaad's mother)
- Shakti Kapoor as Garg
- Ishrat Ali as Katkar
- Kader Khan as Hiravat Mishra
- Arjun as Hiravat's Son
- Raza Murad as Police Commissioner
- Mahavir Shah as Police Inspector D.Lal
- Alok Nath as Police Constable Hari Dada
- Rakesh Bedi as Police Constable Khote
- Harish Patel as Police Constable Khare
- Yunus Parvez as Village Zamindar
- Sudhir
- Mac Mohan
- Johnny Lever
- Raju Srivastav
- Sulabha Deshpande
- Sulabha Arya
- Girija Shankar as Police Inspector

== Soundtrack ==
#	Title	Singer(s)
1	"Garmi Lage Garmi"	Kumar Sanu, Ila Arun
2	"Main Teri Chanchal"	Kumar Sanu, Alka Yagnik
3	"Tu Jhumta Huva Saawan"	Kumar Sanu, Alka Yagnik
4	"Gilli Bina Aisa Danda"	Kumar Sanu, Arun Bakshi, Kavita Krishnamurthy
5	"Azaad Aaya Re"	Kumar Sanu
6	"Kali Kali Mein"	Udit Narayan, Kavita Krishnamurthy
7	"Diya Diya Dil Tujhko"	Kumar Sanu, Alka Yagnik
8	"Saathi Mera Kaise Kate Rasta"	K. J. Yesudas
