= Rang (1993 film) =

Rang (Kamal Sadanand)
- Theatrical release poster
- Directed by: Talat Jani
- Written by: Sagar Sarhadi (dialogues)
- Screenplay by: Rumi Jaffery
- Story by: Talat Jani
- Produced by: Mansoor Ahmed Siddiqui
- Starring: Jeetendra; Amrita Singh; Kamal Sadanah; Divya Bharti; Ayesha Jhulka
- Cinematography: Laxminarayan; Kabir Lal
- Edited by: Deepak Y. Wirkud; Vilas Ranade
- Music by: Nadeem-Shravan
- Production company: ANAS Films
- Release date: 9 July 1993
- Running time: 151 minutes
- Country: India
- Language: Hindi
- Box office: ₹3.44 crore

Rang (pronounced [raːŋɡ]; transl. Colour) is a 1993 Indian Hindi-language romance film, produced by Mansoor Ahmed Siddiqui under the ANAS Films banner and directed by Talat Jani. It stars Divya Bharti, Kamal Sadanah and Ayesha Jhulka, with Jeetendra, Amrita Singh, Kader Khan and Bindu portraying other pivotal roles. In the film, Pooja (Jhulka) and Kajal (Bharti), being unaware of their real identities, fall in love with Yogi (Sadanah). But, upon learning about their connection, one of them decides to sacrifice for the other, while also trying to reunite their family.

Talat Jani, in addition to directing, provided the film's story, on which Rumi Jaffrey based his screenplay, while Sagar Sarhadi was credited for the dialogues. Laxminarayan and Kabir Lal handled the cinematography while Deepak Y. Wirkud and Vilas Ranade jointly edited the film. Nadeem–Shravan composed the film's music, with lyrics penned by Sameer and Surinder Sathi.

Upon its release, Rang emerged a critical and commercial success. It grossed ₹3.44 crore (US$360,000) worldwide. Divya Bharti died before the film was released; it was dedicated to her memory. It also marked the last screen appearance of Amrita Singh, before her temporary hiatus from acting.

== Plot ==
Yogi Joshi (Kamal Sadanah) is a hardworking middle-class student who goes to college with the traditional Pooja (Ayesha Julka), the daughter of a single father. Pooja has been in love with Yogi for quite some time, but Yogi seems to consider her as a good friend. Being very possessive of a particular parking spot in front of her college, Pooja does not like anyone else parking in that spot.

Yogi's father (Bharat Kapoor) works at the factory owned by the successful Indu Singh (Amrita Singh). Indu admits her daughter, Kajal into the same college as Yogi and Pooja. She is a trustee of the college and is assured by the Principal that Kajal is in good hands. Kajal (Divya Bharti) goes to college and tries to park in Pooja's spot, but Pooja cuts her off. The two get in an altercation and in order to show Pooja how much power she has, Kajal drives her jeep into the corridors of the college and stops right in front of Pooja and her friends, including Yogi. Pooja, however, holds her own and is unimpressed. Pooja and Yogi's friend Jojo, who had been run over by Kajal in her rampage, tells his friends that he has cut down Kajal's brakes. Yogi, feeling responsible for Jojo's actions, runs after Kajal's car. He catches up to her right as her car falls over a cliff and into a river. He saves the unconscious Kajal from drowning and brings her home. Indu's mother, the snobby Suchitra (Bindu) offends Yogi by trying to give him money, but he politely refuses.

That night, Kajal and Yogi dream about each other as they fall in love. The next day, Kajal approaches Yogi and asks him if they could be friends. Yogi points out the difference in their class and status. Specifically, he opines that Kajal has a car and he does not. Owing to this, Kajal decides that she would not use a car until Yogi agrees to go on a date with her. After discovering Kajal walking home drenched in sweat, Yogi changes his mind to convince her. They go to see the movie, Bobby, and imagine themselves as the characters during the famous song "Hum Tum Ek Kamre Mein Band Ho." Gradually, they spend a lot of time together and consequently, fall in love. Suchitra encounters the two of them together and is enraged.

On Rose Day, Kajal knows that Yogi is waiting for her with a rose so she obsesses on what to wear and is late to college. Pooja sees Yogi holding a rose and waiting for someone. She assumes the rose is for her and takes it from his hands and runs away. She feels that this is a sign that Yogi too loves her.

Meanwhile, Yogi's father is the Union leader and when the factory workers decide to protest against Indu's company, she fires Mr. Joshi. He is helped by chairman Ajay Malhotra (Jeetendra) who is a hero to factory workers. Ajay Malhotra turns out to be Pooja's father. When he finds out that Pooja is in love with Mr. Joshi's son, he goes to the Joshi residence in the pouring rain to ask for Yogi's hand in marriage for Pooja. Mrs. Joshi (Rita Bhaduri) knew her son was in love with someone and had assumed it to be Pooja, who had come to her house looking for Yogi.

When Yogi finds out about the proposal, he informs his parents that he is in love with Indu's daughter Kajal. His parents show him that he wants to marry the daughter of the woman who ruined his father, as opposed to the daughter of the man who saved him. So Yogi tries to break it off with Kajal, but he cannot bear to stand by this decision. When Yogi tells Pooja that he is in love with Kajal, Pooja tries to commit suicide. A distraught Ajay goes to Kajal and begs her to save his daughter by breaking up with Yogi. She responds by telling him that she can't give up her life to save his daughter's life.

Kajal is touched by Ajay's fatherly devotion and thinks of her own father. She asks her grandfather, Madhav Singh (Kader Khan) about her father. Her grandfather finds an old picture of her father. To her surprise, Ajay Malhotra is her father. Madhav Singh tells Kajal that her father was an activist for workers' rights. Suchitra had never approved of the match as Indu's family was rich and Ajay was a lowly middle-class factory worker. However, the two were in love, so they married and they had a daughter. When Ajay led the Singh factory workers into the strike, Suchitra had instigated the workers against Ajay by making it seem as if he had been bribed to end the strike. He confronted his mother-in-law and asked Indu to choose between her mother and her family. She hesitated as she felt dizzy. Ajay didn't see her being dizzy and thought Indu was choosing her mother, so he angrily took their baby daughter and walked out on their relationship. Indu fainted and found out that she was pregnant again. Suchitra convinced her to raise this child by herself and let Ajay go.

When Kajal realizes that Pooja is her elder sister, she decides to sacrifice her love to save her sister's life by moving to America. This decision leaves Yogi heartbroken, which puts Kajal in a miserable state. Unable to see his granddaughter in pain, Madhav goes to Ajay and informs him that Kajal is his daughter and that he is sacrificing one daughter for another.

Ajay, unaware that he had another daughter, rushes to stop Kajal from going to America. He moves Kajal into her own apartment and spends time with her. He keeps his relationship with Kajal a secret from Pooja as he is waiting for the right time to tell her. Ajay also helps Yogi mend his relationship with Kajal by explaining her situation. The lovers reunite.

Pooja starts suspecting that her father is keeping something from her and follows him one day. She follows him to Kajal's apartment and finds her father spending time with her. She then sees Yogi joining them and her father is supportive of Yogi and Kajal's relationship. Pooja feels betrayed and confronts her father. Her father informs Pooja that Kajal is her younger sister. Kajal again decides to go to America, this time, to get out of the way of Ajay's relationship with Pooja. This time, Pooja stops her and embraces her little sister.

Suchitra finds out that Kajal never reached America and has Yogi arrested for kidnapping. Ajay comes to the rescue and confesses that he has Kajal. The police cannot charge Ajay for taking care of his daughter, so they release Yogi. Indu goes to Kajal and tries to force her to go home, but Kajal refuses. Indu is hurt and walks away. On her way out, Ajay invites Indu to their daughter's wedding. Pooja then goes to see her estranged mother. Pooja confronts Indu for never caring about her. Indu tells her that she never stopped thinking of her elder daughter. Pooja begs Indu to reconcile with her father so that the girls will have both a mother and father, instead of having to choose between the two. Madhav Singh finally stands up to his wife Suchitra to go to Kajal's wedding. Suchitra melts and decides to go to the wedding too.

Ajay tries to contact Indu, but she arrives before he can do that. The two finally reconcile and decide to put their past behind them. The family is finally together.

== Cast ==
- Jeetendra as Ajay Malhotra
- Amrita Singh as Indu
- Kamal Sadanah as Yogi Joshi
- Divya Bharti as Kajal
- Ayesha Jhulka as Pooja
- Kader Khan as Madhav Singh
- Bindu as Suchitra Singh
- Rita Bhaduri as Mrs. Joshi
- Bharat Kapoor as Mr. Joshi
- Raju Shrestha as Jojo
- Dinesh Hingoo as Board Member
- Tiku Talsania as Principal
- Arun Bakshi as Lecturer
- Chhote Ustad as Rangeela
- Nilofar as Pooja's friend
- Baby Ashrafa as Jyoti

== Production ==
Rang marked the directorial debut of Talat Jani. He was additionally credited for providing the story. Divya Bharti, the leading actress of the film, died shortly after filming was completed; the film was released three months after her death, posthumously. Karisma Kapoor had initially been selected for the main lead role, after producer Mansoor Ahmed Siddique expressed his desire on casting her. However, the film's other actress, Ayesha Jhulka, refused to work with Kapoor. Chandni was then considered for Jhulka's role. But, owing to unknown reasons, she left the film after a few days. Kapoor too backed out due to delay in starting the film. Finally, Bharti was signed in place of Kapoor and since the latter was not anymore a part of the film, Jhulka agreed to retain her role.

Kamal Sadanah, who had made his debut with Bekhudi, was signed for the male lead; he was the first person to be selected. Actor Jeetendra had completed shooting his scenes, but on learning from his manager that the producer had not paid his due salary, refrained from dubbing for his character. Rather than convincing him to do the same, the makers hired a dubbing artisté to dub his voice. Ashwini Bhave had initially been narrated the script and was under consideration for the role of Indu. She opined that those days were for her to be the heroine, instead of playing the mother to a new-face actress. She was consequently, replaced by Amrita Singh. This was her last film before her decade long hiatus. Bindu and Kader Khan played secondary roles in the film. Nadeem–Shravan, a very eminent music composing duo in those days, composed the film's soundtrack with lyrics penned by Sameer and Surinder Sathi. The soundtrack had attained popularity prior to the release of the film.

== Soundtrack ==
Rang

Soundtrack album by Nadeem-Shravan
- Released: 1993
- Recorded: 1992
- Venue: Mumbai
- Studio: Sunny Super Sound
- Genre: Feature film soundtrack
- Language: Hindi
- Label: Tips Music
- Producer: Mansoor Ahmed Siddiqui

Nadeem-Shravan chronology
Waqt Hamara Hai (1993)	Rang (1993)	Hum Hain Rahi Pyar Ke (1993)

The music from the duo Nadeem-Shravan was a chartbuster. The song lyrics were penned by Sameer and Surinder Sathi. Kumar Sanu, Alka Yagnik, Udit Narayan and P.Sunanda contributed their voice for the album. "Tujhe Na Dekhu Toh Chain", "Tumhein Dekhen Meri Aankhen", "Teri Mohabbat Ne" & "Dil Cheer Ke Dekh" were popular songs. According to the Indian trade website Box Office India, with around 2,000,000 units sold, this film's soundtrack album was the year's thirteen highest-selling.

#	Title	Singer(s)
1.	"Tujhe Na Dekhu Toh Chain (Kahin Mujhe Pyar Hua To Nahi Hai)”	Kumar Sanu, Alka Yagnik
2.	"Tumhein Dekhen Meri Aankhen"	Kumar Sanu, Alka Yagnik, P.Sunanda
3.	"Teri Mohabbat Ne Dil"	Kumar Sanu, Alka Yagnik
4.	"Hum Tum Picture Dekh Rahe"	Udit Narayan, Alka Yagnik
5.	"Dil Cheer Ke Dekh"	Kumar Sanu
6.	"Mere Pyaar Ka Hisaab"	Kumar Sanu, Alka Yagnik
7.	"Tera Hi Naam Hoga"	Alka Yagnik
8.	"Coming Coming Coming"	Alka Yagnik

== Release and reception ==
Rang was released theatrically on 9 July 1993. Besides India, the film took a bumper opening in the United States and Canada, mainly because it was promoted as being Divya Bharti's last film; people gathered into the theaters to get a last glimpse of her. The film's soundtrack had gained popularity prior to the release, which was even attributed to the film's success. It had a net worldwide gross of ₹3.44 crore (US$360,000) and emerged as an Average. Critical reviews for the film were mixed to positive. Author and film critic Gautam Chintamani published his review of the film in The Hans India where he addressed it to be one of the better love triangles in Bollywood that "went unnoticed". He appreciated the cinematography and cast performances, though, according to him, the film appears "disjointed at places". He further praised the film's theme and the screenplay, on how it provides the women "a certain sense of liberation" in the film. Raving about Bharti's performance, he said that her "sheer screen presence and her timing is the stuff legends are made of".
