= Mashooq (film) =

- LP Vinyl Records Cover
- Directed by: Mirza Brothers
- Produced by: Mirza Brothers
- Starring: Ayub Khan; Ayesha Jhulka
- Music by: Shyam Surender
- Release date: 10 July 1992
- Country: India
- Language: Hindi

Mashooq is a 1992 Indian Hindi-language film directed by the Mirza Brothers, starring Ayub Khan, Ayesha Jhulka in lead roles. The film's story is based on The Taming of the Shrew.

== Cast ==
- Ayub Khan as Karan
- Ayesha Jhulka as Nisha
- Kiran Kumar as Shankar
- Raza Murad as Bar Owner
- Pran as Kedarnath
- Beena Banerjee as Suman

== Songs ==
The music was composed by Shyam Surendra. All the songs were popular.

#	Song	Singer
1.	"Kaun Ho Tum"	Abhijeet, Kavita Krishnamurthy
2.	"Deewana Dil Dhoondhe"	Kumar Sanu
3.	"Tumhe Dil To De Chuke Hain"	Kumar Sanu, Kavita Krishnamurthy
4.	"O Sarphiri, O Deewani"	Kumar Sanu
5.	"Yeh Dhadkan Mere Dil Ki"	Kumar Sanu, Kavita Krishnamurthy
6.	"Too Bhi Tadpegi"	Kumar Sanu
7.	"O Yaara Kaisee Hai Teri Bewafai"	Kumar Sanu, Kavita Krishnamurthy
