= Himmatwala (1998 film) =

1998 Hindi film

- Poster
- Directed by: Jayant Gilatar
- Story by: Jayant Gilatar
- Produced by: A Krishnamurthy
- Starring: Mithun Chakraborty; Ayesha Jhulka; Shakti Kapoor; Dina Pathak; Tiku Talsania; Tinnu Anand
- Cinematography: K V Ramanna
- Edited by: Shyam Mukherjee
- Music by: Tabun Sutradhar
- Production company: Tina Films International
- Release date: 25 December 1998
- Running time: 135 minutes
- Country: India
- Language: Hindi

Himmatwala is a 1998 Indian Hindi-language action film directed by Jayant Gilatar, starring Mithun Chakraborty and Ayesha Jhulka. Other important roles were portrayed by Shakti Kapoor, Dina Pathak, Tiku Talsania and Tinnu Anand. The film introduces Rajesh Sharma and Radhika.

== Plot ==
Kishan leads a happy life with his wife and sister, Kiran, in a quaint village. However, when he discovers that Kiran is in love with Suraj, the son of the village headman, Chandra Prakash, Kishan proposes to Suraj on her behalf. Chandra Prakash becomes enraged, throws Kishan out of his house, and humiliates him in the process.

Suraj then arrives and tells Kishan that he intends to marry Kiran regardless of his father's permission. While Kiran and Suraj are getting married, Chandra Prakash arrives and murders them both in front of everyone.

Kishan is hit on the head, causing him to lose his sanity and regress to the mental age of seven.

When the eloping couple, Raja and Kajal (who resembles Kiran), come to him for help, he assists them and regains his sanity. Will he succeed where he failed with his sister and reunite Kajal with her lover?

== Cast ==
- Mithun Chakraborty as Kishan
- Ayesha Jhulka as Radha
- Shakti Kapoor as Chandra Prakash Kanyal
- Mukul Dev as Suraj
- Keerthi Chawla as Kiran/ Kajal (Dual Role)
- Reema Lagoo as aunt of Raja
- Tiku Talsania as Bakra
- Tinnu Anand as Banke: Suman's adopted elder brother; Vicky's father
- Rajeev Verma as Durgesh Maheshwari Kajal's Father
- Rajesh Sharma as Raja
- Dina Pathak as grandmother Kajal
- Beena Banerjee as Suman Durgesh Maheshwari Kajal's Mother
- Amitesh Koccher as Chintu Child Artist

== Soundtrack ==
Himmatwala

Soundtrack album by Tabun Sutradhar
- Released: 12 November 1998
- Genre: Feature film soundtrack
- Label: T-Series

no.	Name	Singer(s)
1	"Dil Ka Raja"	Abhijeet, Alka Yagnik
2	"Hum Maane Hum Maane"	Sukhwinder Singh
3	"Ho Maro Pichkari"	Sudesh Bhosle; Poornima
4	"Twinkle Twinkle"	Babul Supriyo; Aditya Narayan
5	"Main To Tere Pyar Mein"	Kumar Sanu; Kavita Krishnamurthy
