= Kohra (1993 film) =

- Directed by: Partho Ghosh
- Produced by: Pushpa S Chaudhary
- Starring: Armaan Kohli; Ayesha Jhulka; Pran; Kiran Kumar; Sadashiv Amrapurkar; Gulshan Grover
- Music by: Charanjeet Aahuja
- Production company: Heera International
- Release date: 8 October 1993
- Country: India

Kohra is a 1993 Hindi mystery thriller film starring Armaan Kohli and Ayesha Jhulka. The movie is directed by Partho Ghosh and produced by Pushpa S Chaudhary.

== Plot ==
Nisha Rathod and Anand Kohli joins in the same college and despite the ragging and pranks they play on each other initially, they fall in love with each other. During a prank at the college, Nisha gifts Anand a wooden cane while ragging him which later gets exchanged mistakenly with an identical cane that contains smuggled diamonds when Anand bumps into a stranger on a street. The diamonds belong to Sir John. Sir John and Peter Gonsalves are dreaded criminals and smugglers whom the Customs teams led by Officer Kailashnath Rathod and the police force headed by IG Suryakant are trying to nab. Suryakant hands Anand this case of nabbing Sir John and Anand starts investigating. But who is Sir John?

== Cast ==
- Armaan Kohli as Anand Sharma
- Ayesha Jhulka as Nisha Rathod
- Kiran Kumar as IG Suryakant Sharma
- Sadashiv Amrapurkar as CBI Officer Neelkanth Sahay / Jakarto
- Tinnu Anand as Peter Gonsalves
- Gulshan Grover as Tinu
- Pran as Custom Officer Kailashnath Rathod / Sir John
- Deepak Saraf as Dr. Deepak Kaushal
- Brijesh Tiwari as Seth Damanwala
- Pradeep Rawat ad Tinu's Henchman
- Rana Jung Bahadur as Sir John's Henchman
- K.K. Raj as Teja
- Kunickaa Sadanand as Kitty
