= Sanam Bewafa =

- Poster
- Directed by: Saawan Kumar Tak
- Written by: Bharat B. Bhalla; Anwar Khan; Saawan Kumar Tak
- Produced by: Saawan Kumar Tak
- Starring: Salman Khan; Chandni; Pran; Danny Denzongpa
- Cinematography: Manmohan Singh
- Edited by: Jawahar Razdan
- Music by: Mahesh-Kishor
- Production company: Saawan Kumar Tak Productions Pvt Ltd
- Release date: 11 January 1991
- Running time: 161 minutes
- Country: India
- Language: Hindi
- Budget: ₹90 lakh
- Box office: est. ₹14.25 crore

Sanam Bewafa (transl. Unfaithful Beloved) is a 1991 Indian language film directed and produced by Saawan Kumar Tak, it stars Salman Khan, Chandni, Pran, Danny Denzongpa.It was inspired by the Pakistani Punjabi film Haq Mehar (1985).

== Plot ==
The film is based on two Pathan Tribal families who have been feuding for many generations. Salman, Sher Khan's son, falls in love with Rukhsar, Fateh Khan's daughter.

On finding the truth, Fateh Khan finds his wrath too much to control. On the other hand, Sher Khan is extremely happy to know that his son is in love with his enemy's daughter and promises Salman that he shall get him married to Rukhsar. The marriage is settled after great difficulties.

On the day of the marriage ceremony, Fateh Khan places an incredible demand in Haque-Meher, Sher Khan is dumbfounded and shocked, but gives in for his son's happiness. Hurt by the insult, Sher Khan retaliates by throwing Rukhsar out of the house the following morning after the marriage, paying the agreed Haque-Meher (Daaj). On seeing Rukhsar back, her family is numb with shock.

This leads to conflicts between the two families resulting in bloodshed and loss of life on both sides, but Sher Khan and Fateh Khan remain adamant until they discover that Rukhsar is pregnant with Salman's Son. The newborn finally lead to peace between the two Families.

== Cast ==
- Salman Khan as Salman Khan
- Chandni as Rukhsar Khan
- Pran as Fateh Khan
- Danny Denzongpa as Sher Khan
- Puneet Issar as Afzal Khan
- Pankaj Dheer as Zuber Khan
- Dina Pathak as Fateh's Mother
- Jagdeep as Daroga
- Kanchan as Kanchan
- Vijayendra Ghatge as Sajjan Thakur
- Gurbachan Singh as Jangi Khan
- Dan Dhanoa as Shaukat Khan

== Music ==
The music was composed by Mahesh Kishor and lyrics were penned by Saawan Kumar himself. Singers Lata Mangeshkar, Vipin Sachdeva, Kavita Krishnamurthy contributed their voice. The songs were and had a flavor of 1970's music. "Churi Maza Na Degi" & "O Hare Dupatte Wali" were popular songs.

| Song | Singer |
|---|---|
| "Allah Karam Karna" | Lata Mangeshkar |
| "Chudi Maza Na Degi" | Lata Mangeshkar |
| "O Mere Jijaji, O Mere Jijaji" | Lata Mangeshkar |
| "Mujhe Allah Ki Kasam, Tumse Pyar Ho Gaya" | Lata Mangeshkar, Vipin Sachdeva |
| "Sanam Bewafa, O Sanam Bewafa, Main Nahin Bewafa" | Lata Mangeshkar, Vipin Sachdeva |
| "Be-Iraada Nazar Mil Gayi" | Vipin Sachdeva |
| "O Hare Dupattewali" | Vipin Sachdeva |
| "Meri Jaan Chali" | Vivek Verma |
| "Angoor Ka Dana Hoon" | Kavita Krishnamurthy |

== Reception ==
N. Krishnaswamy of The Indian Express wrote that "The romantic angle is there, but Salman Khan and newface Chandini are but lovers who pale before the enmity of their two families".

== Box office ==
In India, the film netted approx ₹8 crore. It was declared "Blockbuster" by Trade Magazines. As per Trade Guide, It was one of the biggest Blockbuster ever in territories like Delhi-U.P., Nizam, CP Berar, CI, Rajasthan & East Punjab. In many areas of these territories, it even broke record of Sholay and Maine Pyar Kiya.

== Awards ==
37th Filmfare Awards:

- Best Supporting Actor – Danny Denzongpa
