= Neti Siddhartha =

- Theatrical release poster
- Directed by: Kranthi Kumar
- Written by: Kranthi Kumar; Satyanand (dialogues)
- Produced by: Kranthi Kumar
- Starring: Nagarjuna; Krishnam Raju; Shobana; Ayesha Jhulka
- Cinematography: P. S. Prakash
- Edited by: A. Sreekar Prasad
- Music by: Laxmikant–Pyarelal
- Production company: Kranthi Chitra
- Release date: 15 June 1990
- Running time: 142 minutes
- Country: India
- Language: Telugu

Neti Siddhartha, also known by its alternative title Siddhartha, is a 1990 Telugu-language action film co-written, produced, and directed by Kranthi Kumar under the Kranthi Chitra banner. It stars Nagarjuna, Krishnam Raju, Shobana and Ayesha Jhulka (in her lead acting debut), with music composed by Laxmikant–Pyarelal. It is a remake of the Hindi film Dharmatma (1975), itself based on The Godfather. It did moderately well at the box office.

== Plot ==
Siddhartha (Nagarjuna) is the son of K.P. (Krishnam Raju), a business magnate. Siddhartha comes back from the states after so many years. Jyothi (Shobana), his childhood friend, has an unrequited love for him. One day, he is told K.P. rules an underworld mafia syndicate by his friend David (Sarath Babu), whom K.P. then kills. Siddhartha leaves home and reaches a forest where he falls in love with a tribal girl, Basanti (Ayesha Jhulka). Meanwhile, syndicate members Jogendra (Tiger Prabhakar) and Shetty (Pradeep Shakthi) plan to kill K.P. and Siddhartha with the help of his son-in-law Chakravarthy (J. D. Chakravarthy), leading to K.P. and Basanti's deaths. Siddhartha returns to rule the syndicate, and takes revenge on his remaining enemies.

== Cast ==
- Nagarjuna as Siddhartha
- Krishnam Raju as Krishna Prasad "K. P."
- Shobana as Jyothi
- Ayesha Jhulka as Basanthi
- J. D. Chakravarthy as Chakravarthy
- Kannada Prabhaakar as Joginder
- Sarath Babu as David
- Pradeep Shakthi as Shetty
- Devaraj as Bhillu
- Charu Haasan as Dr. Nidhi
- Thyagaraju as Commissioner
- P. L. Narayana as Viswam
- Suthivelu as Dingo Sab
- Potti Prasad as Writer
- Vadivukkarasi as Bharathi
- Tara as Rekha
- Sri Lakshmi as Writer
- Rajyalakshmi as Sofi (David's wife)

== Soundtrack ==
Neti Siddhartha

Film score by Laxmikant–Pyarelal
- Released: 1990
- Genre: Soundtrack
- Length: 29:00
- Label: LEO Audio
- Producer: Laxmikant–Pyarelal

The film's songs were composed by Laxmikant–Pyarelal, with lyrics by Veturi, and released by LEO Audio Company.

No.	Title	Singer(s)	Length
1.	"Osi Manasa Neeku Thelusa"	S. P. Balasubrahmanyam, S. Janaki	7:30
2.	"Neeve Katha Naa Sweetu Figaru"	S. P. Balasubrahmanyam, Kavita Krishnamurthy	4:08
3.	"Kondallo Bada O Konallo"	S. P. Balasubrahmanyam, S. Janaki	6:51
4.	"Chumma Kotti Pothanamma"	S. P. Balasubrahmanyam, Kavita Krishnamurthy	6:20
5.	"Prema Katha Modhaledithe"	S. P. Balasubrahmanyam, Kavita Krishnamurthy	4:11
Total length:			29:00
