= Jai Kishen =

- Poster
- Directed by: Sunil Agnihotri
- Produced by: Narottam V. Purohit; Vijay K. Ranglani
- Starring: Akshay Kumar; Ayesha Julka; Chandni; Reema Lagoo; Arun Bakshi
- Music by: Anand–Milind
- Distributed by: Shalimar International
- Release date: 10 June 1994
- Language: Hindi
- Budget: ₹1.25 crore
- Box office: est.₹4.53 crore

Jai Kishen is a 1994 Bollywood action drama film directed by Sunil Agnihotri. It stars Akshay Kumar in a dual role, Ayesha Julka and Chandni. It was the first film where Akshay Kumar appeared in a dual role. Kumar plays twin brothers separated as children, with one character portrayed as a visually impaired but skilled swordsman and the other as a streetwise criminal. Kumar later played a visually impaired character again in Aankhen (2002).

The film was a below average grosser at the box office.

== Plot ==
The story revolves around the identical twin brothers named 'Jai' and 'Kishen'. When they were children, goons of Anand Rao Anthya kills their father and they are separated. Jai grows up with his widowed mother, and is blind and has a sixth sense. Kishen stays in the city with his girlfriend Anita and he becomes a wanted thief.

One day, Jai goes to a bank while some goons rush in to rob it. Jai's guiding stick has a long sword inside used for self defense. When the goons threaten a customer's child, Jai uses his sixth sense and his sword to kill the goons and save the child. The child's grateful mother gives Jai a cheque for 4 lakh rupees and this is posted on newspapers.

Anita see the newspaper and gets upset at Kishen for keeping the 4 lakh rupees to himself. Kishen determines that Jai must be his look-alike. The two plan to use Jai's identity to steal so that Jai is blamed for the crimes.

The next day, Kishen and Anita visit four jewelry shops to purchases jewelry using fake checks. They fence the jewelry to make money. The angry jewelers report the theft to the police. Luckily Jai is able to provide evidence that he was at the hospital having his eyes treated during the time of the robbery. The police deduce that the thief must be his look-alike. Overhearing this, Jai's mother believes that Kishen must be alive.

The Jewelers then go to Chhote Bhai, Anand Rao Antya's younger brother. Chhote Bhai tells Kishen to return the jewelry. He agrees on the condition that Chhote Bhai will help him get influence in return, to which Chhote Bhai agrees. However instead of returning the real jewels, Kishen gives the Jewelers counterfeit jewelry. Chhote Bhai is killed trying to stop Kishen's escape.

Meanwhile, Jai's mother wants him to marry his childhood friend Asha. Asha is a Kleptomaniac who is in love with Jai. Eventually Jai too falls in love with her.

Kishen continues to use Jai's identity to commit crimes. Seeing Jai's frustration, his mother finally tells him that Kishen is his identical twin. She tells him about their father's murder and how the twins were separated. Jai searches for his brother to bring him home.

One night, during the thunderstorm, the brothers come face to face in a temple. Jai informs Kishen that they are identical twins and Kishen confesses to his crimes. Kishen begs for forgiveness.

The brothers unite to kill Anand Roy Anantya and his gang. The police arrive to arrest the remaining criminals. Kishen reunites with his mother. The brothers also reunite with their respective lovers, Asha and Anita.

== Cast ==
- Akshay Kumar in a dual role as
  - Jai Verma; Pratap and Mrs.Verma's elder son; Krishna' brother;Asha's husband
  - Kishen Verma; Pratap and Mrs Verma's younger son;Jai 's brother; Anita's husband
- Ayesha Jhulka as Asha Verma; Jai 's wife; Mrs Verma and Pratap's daughter-in-law
- Chandni as Anita Verma; Krishna's wife; Mrs Verma and Pratap's daughter-in-law
- Reema Lagoo as Mrs. Verma; Pratap's wife; Jai and Kishen's mother
- Arun Bakshi as Police Inspector Vikram
- Avtar Gill as Inspector Pratap Singh;Mrs.Verma's husband; Jai and Krishna 's father
- Vikas Anand as Commissioner of Police Mohan Jadhav
- Tinu Anand as Anand Rao Antya
- Mahavir Shah as Chhote Bhai Arvind Gujral
- Viju Khote as Havaldar Shevde
- Deepak Shirke as Kaalia Shirke
- Harish Patel as Putarmal
- Sparsh Puri as child artist
- Mohit Vaya as child artist

== Soundtrack ==
Jai Kishen

Soundtrack album by Anand–Milind
- Released: 4 October 1993
- Genre: Feature film soundtrack
- Length: 31Min
- Label: Tips Industries

The music was composed by Anand–Milind and the lyrics authored by Sameer. The song Jhoole Jhoole Lal, was based on Nusrat Fateh Ali Khan's Dam Mast Kalendar and was a hit when released.

#	Title	Singer(s)
1.	"Jhoole Jhoole Lal"	Arun Bakshi, P. K. Mishra
2.	"Looshe Wai Wai"	Poornima
3.	"Pyar Hua Hai"	Kumar Sanu, Alka Yagnik
4.	"Surat Hai Meri Bholi"	Kumar Sanu, Poornima
5.	"Yaaro Kya Ladki Hai"	Kumar Sanu
6.	"Yeh Alam Yeh Mausam"	Poornima
