= Sangram (1993 film) =

1993 Indian film by Lawrence D'Souza

- Release poster
- Directed by: Lawrence D'Souza
- Written by: Jalees Sherwani (dialogues)
- Story by: Rajeev Kaul; Praful Parekh
- Produced by: Lawrence D'Souza
- Starring: Ajay Devgan; Ayesha Jhulka; Karishma Kapoor
- Cinematography: Lawrence D'Souza
- Edited by: R. Rajendran
- Music by: Nadeem-Shravan
- Production company: 3R Films
- Release date: 18 June 1993
- Country: India
- Language: Hindi

Sangram is a1993 Hindi romantic action film directed by Lawrence D'Souza, starring Ajay Devgan, Ayesha Jhulka, Karishma Kapoor, Danny Denzongpa, Amrish Puri in pivotal roles. Other casts include Reema Lagoo, Anjana Mumtaz, Laxmikant Berde, Asrani, Avtar Gill, Dinesh Hingoo. It was an average at the box office.

== Plot ==
Raja and Madhu meet at a college. They start off as sworn enemies but eventually become friends before returning to their respective homes. Raja doesn't realize that Madhu has fallen in love with him, and neither knows about the vendetta between their families.

Years ago, Raja's father, Thakur Surajbhan Singh Tomar, broke the heart of Thakur Shamsher Singh Rana's sister, which led to her suicide. When Shamsher finds out that his daughter is in love with Surajbhan's son, he forbids her from ever seeing him again. However, Shamsher's wife cannot bear her daughter's grief and goes to see Surajbhan's wife, asking the latter to help her bring an end to the feud between the two families. Surajbhan agrees to end the enmity and goes to talk to Shamsher. He asks Shamsher to accept their children's wishes and allow their marriage. After some initial hesitation, Shamsher agrees. However, he warns Surajbhan not to break his daughter's heart the way he hurt his sister.

Meanwhile, Raja has no idea that his marriage has been arranged with Madhu. He has fallen in love with Pallavi, a poor girl living on his father's estate. When Shamsher finds out that Raja does not want to marry his daughter, he vows to destroy Surajbhan's family. Surajbhan is also livid at Raja's defiance. Madhu goes off and promptly ingests poison, but is saved by her family. Shamsher tells Pallavi that he will kill Raja if the latter doesn't marry his daughter. Fearing for Raja's life, Pallavi tells him that she never loved him and was only marrying him for his money. A heartbroken Raja returns home. To further clinch the matter, Surajbhan sets Pallavi's hut on fire. Her father is killed, but Pallavi survives. Surajbhan asks his men to take the unconscious Pallavi and dump her body somewhere far away however, Raja's uncle tells him the truth about Shamsher's threats and his father's actions. Raja finds Pallavi and calls a priest to officiate their marriage. Shamsher and his men attack the couple during the ceremony. Surajbhan rushes in to save his son. In the ensuing fight, Shamsher accidentally shoots Madhu. Before dying, Madhu asks Raja to forgive her and begs her father to end the family feud.

== Cast ==
- Ajay Devgan as Raja Singh
- Ayesha Jhulka as Pallavi Singh
- Karishma Kapoor as Madhu Singh
- Danny Denzongpa as Rana Shamsher Singh
- Amrish Puri as Thakur Surajbhan Singh
- Anjana Mumtaz as Karuna Singh
- Reema Lagoo as Mrs. Shamsher Rana
- Satyen Kappu as Kishan Singh
- Asrani as Professor Vishweshwar Trivedi
- Laxmikant Berde as Teji
- Dinesh Hingoo as Principal Shastri
- Avtar Gill as Collector Dandhu
- Tej Sapru as Jagdish Singh Rana
- Deven Bhojani as a College friend of Raja
- Brahmachari as Bansi
- Cheetah Yagnesh Shetty as Shakti

== Soundtrack ==
Sangram

Soundtrack album by Nadeem-Shravan
- Released: 1993
- Venue: Bombay
- Genre: Feature film soundtrack
- Length: 41 Min 31 sec
- Language: Hindi
- Label: Venus Records & Tapes
- Producer: Lawrence D'Souza

The music of the film was composed by Nadeem-Shravan, and the lyrics were penned by Sameer. The soundtrack was released in 1993 on Audio Cassette Venus Records & Tapes Music, While Audio Cassettes and CD is released in Melody International Limited, Which consists of 7 Songs. The full album is recorded by Kumar Sanu, Alka Yagnik, Kavita Krishnamurthy, Mukul Agarwal and P. Sunanda.

Song	Singer
"Bheegi Hui Hai Raat Magar"	Kavita Krishnamurthy & Kumar Sanu
"I Am Sorry"	Mukul Agarwal & Alka Yagnik
"Sajna Banke"	Alka Yagnik & P. Sunanda
"Dil Mein Mohabbat"	Kumar Sanu & Alka Yagnik
"Jeetega Wohi Jisme Hai Dum"	Kumar Sanu & P. Sunanda
"Tum Meri Mohabbat Ho"	Kumar Sanu, Alka Yagnik & P. Sunanda
"Udte Badal Se Poochho"	Alka Yagnik
