= Kaise Kaise Rishte =

- Directed by: Akash Verma
- Produced by: Mohinder Singh
- Starring: Ayesha Jhulka; Shahbaz Khan; Rohini Hattangadi
- Music by: Nadeem-Shravan; Sameer (lyrics)
- Release date: 5 November 1993

Kaise Kaise Rishte is a 1993 Bollywood film starring Ayesha Jhulka.

== Cast ==
- Shahbaaz Khan as Ravi
- Ayesha Jhulka as Pooja
- Sumeet Pathak as Raja (child artist)
- Vikas Anand as Advocate Mohan Kumar
- Satyendra Kapoor as Khanna
- Kiran Kumar as Verma
- Shakti Kapoor as Bankelal Taxiwala
- Sanam as Pinky Verma
- Satish Shah as Chopat
- Jayshree T. as Chanda, Bankelal's wife
- Ram Mohan as Kabir, Pooja's father
- Goga Kapoor as Murali Bhaiyya, Ravi's uncle.
- Rohini Hattangadi as Durga, Ravi's mother.

== Soundtrack ==
1. "Bhiga Hai Mausam Khali Hai Ghar" - Alisha Chinai, Kumar Sanu
2. "Ho Gaya Hai Pyar Ka Mausam Jawan" * Kumar Sanu, Alka Yagnik
3. "Kaise Kaise Rishte" (Sad) - Mohammed Aziz
4. "Na Mang Diya Gora" - Alka Yagnik
5. "Nazuk Hu Meri Kalai Ko" - Sapna Mukherjee
6. "Phulo Se Zyada Hasin Hai" - Alka Yagnik, Kumar Sanu
7. "Rab Ne To Bas Banaya Tha Rishta" - Mohammed Aziz
