= Izzat Ki Roti =

- Movie poster
- Directed by: K. Pappu
- Screenplay by: K. Pappu; Ranbir Pushp; M. Parvez
- Dialogues by: Anwar Khan
- Story by: K. Pappu
- Produced by: K. Pappu
- Starring: Sunny Deol; Rishi Kapoor; Juhi Chawla; Farah; Prem Chopra; Anupam Kher; Kulbhushan Kharbanda
- Cinematography: Sushil Chopra
- Edited by: Kuldip Mehan
- Music by: Bappi Lahiri
- Production company: Grand Master Movies
- Distributed by: Eros International
- Release date: 13 August 1993 (India)
- Country: India
- Language: Hindi

Izzat Ki Roti (transl. Bread of Honor) is a 1993 Indian Hindi-language action drama film produced and directed by K. Pappu. It stars Sunny Deol, Rishi Kapoor, Juhi Chawla and Farah in pivotal roles.

== Plot ==
Multi-millionaire Vijay manages a trucking service and is quite friendly with one of his truck drivers, Veerendra Pratap alias Veeru. Vijay finds out that Veeru is using his trucks to carry out illegal activities and thus turn him over to the police which results in Veeru getting 20 years jail term. Vijay and his wife Laxmi then adopt Veeru's son, Krishna and bring him to take up resident with their biological son, Jeet. Years later Veeru completes his sentence and thinks about closing in on Vijay only to learn that he is not alive any more and that his business is managed by Krishna and Jeet. Krishna loves Pinky and marries her. Jeet and Jyoti are in love with each other. Veeru then schemes to create a rift between Jeet and Krishna over their inheritance without knowing that he has agreed to implicate his very own son, Krishna. Jeet and Krishna foil his attempt successfully and Jeet gets united with Jyoti.

== Cast ==
- Rishi Kapoor as Krishna – Jeet’s elder adoptive brother, Pinky’s husband
- Sunny Deol as Jeet – Krishna’s younger adoptive brother, Jyoti’s boyfriend
- Juhi Chawla as Jyoti – Jeet’s girlfriend
- Farah as Pinky – Krishna’s wife
- Tanuja as Laxmi – Jeet’s mother, Krishna’s adoptive mother
- Kulbhushan Kharbanda as Vijay – Laxmi’s husband, Jeet’s father, Krishna’s adoptive father
- Prem Chopra as Virender – Krishna's biological father
- Anupam Kher as Girdharilal Chakradhari – Pinky’s maternal uncle
- Alok Nath as Kaka
- Rammohan Sharma as Ram Prasad – Jyoti’s father
- Urmila Bhatt as Mrs. Ram Prasad – Jyoti’s mother
- Anjana Mumtaz as Parvati
- Dan Dhanoa as Babu Harami
- Arun Bali as Smuggler
- Kamaldeep as Owner of Rahim Transport

== Music and soundtrack ==
The music of the film was composed by Bappi Lahiri and the lyrics of the songs were penned by Anjaan.

#	Title	Singer(s)
1	"Chori Chori Pyar Mein Hai Jo Maja"	Kumar Sanu, Anuradha Paudwal
2	"Mausam Badle To Badle Pyar Na Ye Badlega"	Kumar Sanu, Anuradha Paudwal
3	"Main Teri Ho Gayi, tu Mera Ho Gaya"	Mangal Singh, Anuradha Paudwal
4	"Teri Meri Baat Chali To Aisi Chali"	Amit Kumar, Anuradha Paudwal
5	"Chini Mini Chini Mini Meri Jaan"	Amit Kumar, Anuradha Paudwal
6	"Rabse Bhi Pehle Honthon Pe Mere Sajan"	Anuradha Paudwal
7	"Mera Sona Sajjan Aaya"	Anuradha Paudwal
8	"Humne Unke Mohalle Mein Ghar Le Liya"	Mohammed Aziz, Alka Yagnik, Anupam Kher
9	"Saara Din Saari Raat Teri Yaad Sataye"	Anuradha Paudwal
10	"Rabse Bhi Pehle Honthon Pe Meresaajan Tera"	Pankaj Udhas, Anuradha Paudwal
