= K. Pappu =

Indian film director and screenwriter

K. Pappu (died 11 July 2005) was an Indian film director, producer and screenwriter. He directed films such as Ucha Dar Babe Nanak Da (1982), Jigri Yaar (1984), Mohabbat Ki Kasam (1986), Vishnu-Devaa (1991), Ayee Milan Ki Raat (1991), Izzat Ki Roti (1993), Maha Shaktishaali (1994) and Raghuveer (1995).
