= Rakesh Sharma (banker) =

Private banker in India

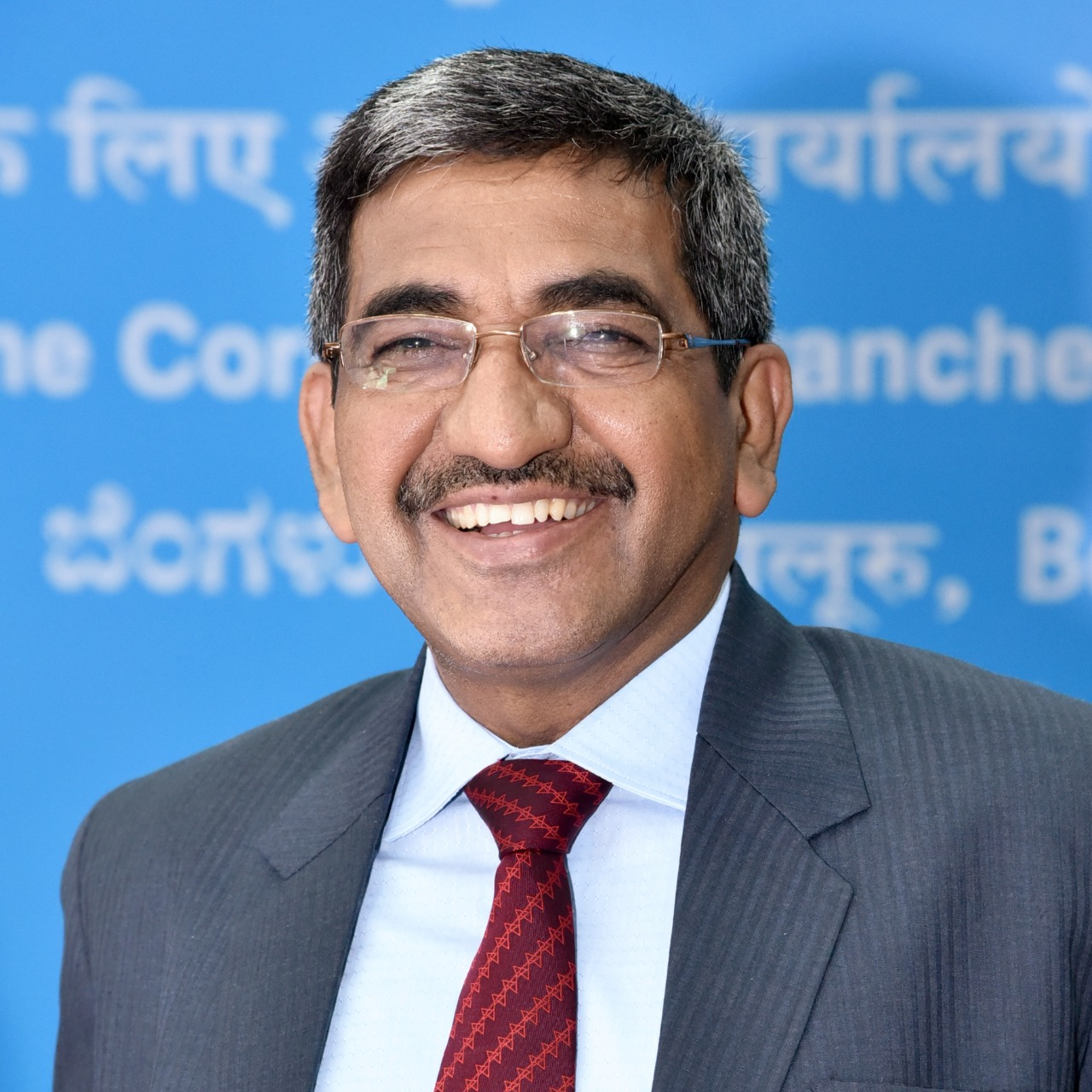
- Born: July 2, 1958 (age 68)
- Occupations: MD & CEO of IDBI Bank
- Children: 2

Rakesh Sharma (born 2 July 1958) is an Indian banker who is the Managing Director & Chief Executive Officer of IDBI Bank. Sharma was the MD and CEO of Lakshmi Vilas Bank and Canara Bank. He has also held positions at State Bank of India during his 33-year tenure with the lender.

== Career ==
Sharma started his career with State Bank of India (SBI) as a probationary officer in 1980 and worked for the bank until 2014. His last position in SBI was that of Chief General Manager for Patna Circle, comprising Bihar and Jharkhand. Sharma has also held portfolios including lending to mid-corporate accounts in Andhra Pradesh region and supervising retail operations in the states of Rajasthan, Uttarakhand and Western UP. Earlier, he was Chief Executive Officer of SBI Japan where he steered and directed operations of SBI branches in Tokyo and Osaka.

Sharma joined Lakshmi Vilas Bank (LVB) as the MD and CEO in March 2014. He helmed Lakshmi Vilas Bank's rapid growth, as well as internal governance and mobile banking.

Sharma joined Canara Bank in September 2015 as part of Government of India's Mission Indradhanush to revive public sector banks. He has led reorganisation drive at the bank moving from a three-tier to a four-tier organisation structure. Sharma has raised capital for the bank through stake sales and by monetising the bank's investments in its subsidiaries such as Can Fin Homes.

== Additional positions held ==
- Sharma is the Non-Executive Chairman of Canara Bank Securities Ltd. (CBSL)
- Non-Executive Chairman of Canbank Computer Services Limited (CCSL)
- Non-Executive Chairman of Canbank Factors Ltd.
- Associate Director of Canara Robeco Asset Management Company Ltd.
- Director of Canbank Venture Capital Fund Ltd (CVCFL)
- Chairman of the Sub-Committee of the Indian Banks’ Association representing 11th Bipartite settlement for Wage Revision
- Chairman of the Working Group on Credit Growth for Gyan Sangam
- Member of the Governing Council of Indian Institute of Banking & Finance
- Member of the Governing Board of Institute of Banking Personnel Selection
- Member of the Managing Committee of the Indian Banks’ Association

== Awards received ==
Sharma received National Award for Excellence in lending to MSME, Micro Enterprises and PMEGP conferred on Canara Bank and presented by Prime Minister Narendra Modi in 2016.
