= Meherbaan =

Hindi film

- Poster
- Directed by: K. Ravi Shankar
- Written by: Shri Anand; Kader Khan (dialogue)
- Based on: Naan Pudicha Mappillai by V. Sekhar
- Produced by: A Krishnamurthi
- Starring: Mithun Chakraborty; Ayesha Jhulka; Shantipriya; Sadashiv Amrapurkar; Anupam Kher; Kader Khan
- Cinematography: K V Ramanna
- Music by: Dilip Sen-Sameer Sen
- Production company: Tina Films International’s
- Release date: 23 July 1993
- Running time: 170 minutes
- Language: Hindi

Meherbaan is a 1993 Indian Hindi-language film directed by K. Ravishankar, starring Mithun Chakraborty, Ayesha Jhulka, Shantipriya, Anupam Kher and Sadashiv Amrapurkar. The film was a remake of Tamil film Naan Pudicha Mappillai.

== Plot ==
Ravi had made promise to his dying father that he will take care of his friend Chaurangilal and his family.Years later Ravi has lived up to his promise Chaurangi's daughter Neha loves him while Chaurangi and his son Vikram are cheating the villagers.Ravi comes across a poor and honest man Shankar living with daughter Chanda.Ravi jails Vikram for molesting a women and insults Chaurangi for cheating.Due to Shankar's situation, he decides to marry Chanda against wishes of his mother.Ravi and Chanda are living happily while Chaurangi is forced to meet daily ends.A pregnant Chanda passes away due to a mine explosion leaving Ravi distressed. but Shankar forces Ravi to marry Neha and start new life.

== Cast ==
- Mithun Chakraborty as Ravi
- Ayesha Jhulka as Chanda
- Shantipriya as Neha
- Sadashiv Amrapurkar as Chaurangilal
- Anupam Kher as Shankar
- Ajinkya Dev as Vikram
- Kader Khan as Biku
- Sulbha Deshpande as Ravi's mother
- Shobha Khote as special guest
- Dina Pathak
- Tina Ghai
- Kalpana Iyer

== Soundtrack ==
Meherbaan

Soundtrack album by Dilip Sen-Sameer Sen
- Released: 1993
- Length: 57:03
- Language: Hindi
- Label: T-Series

The music of the film was composed by Dilip Sen-Sameer Sen and the lyrics were penned by Rani Malik, Mahendra Dehlvi, Maya Govind and Dilip Tahir. The Song "Agar Aasman Tak Mere Hath Jaate" is First Song Playback in Hindi Movie By Sonu Nigam. "Bol gori bol itni si baat" sung by Anuradha Paudwal and Ila Arun was a major hit.

Track #	Title	Singer(s)	Lyricist	Length
1	"Agar Aasman Tak Mere Haath Jaate"	Sonu Nigam; Anuradha Paudwal	Rani Malik	04:57
2	"Dhire Se Chupke Se Dil Ne Liya Tera Naam"	Sonu Nigam; Anuradha Paudwal; Chorus	Rani Malik	06:30
3	"Tum Hriday Ke Devta Ho"	Anuradha Paudwal; Suresh Wadkar	Maya Govind	05:02
4	"Rimjhim Rimjhim Tan Pe Mere Pani"	Anuradha Paudwal	Dilip Tahir	05:44
5	"O Mujhe Jana Hai Piya Ji Ke Gaon Mein"	Anuradha Paudwal; Vinod Rathod; Chorus	Rani Malik	05:50
6	"Ye Kya Kya Dikhati Hai"	Pankaj Udhas	Rani Malik	04:48
7	"Aao Paas Aao Najaren Milao"	Anuradha Paudwal; Vinod Rathod	Rani Malik	05:06
8	"Aao Guru Karen Peena Shuru"	Sudesh Bhosale; Hariharan; Chorus	Mahendra Dehlvi	05:33
9	"Bol Gori Bol Jara Itni Si Baat"	Anuradha Paudwal; Ila Arun; Chorus	Mahendra Dehlvi	04:58
10	"Jo Bhi Aaya Hai Tere Dware"	Sukhwinder Singh; Chorus	Rani Malik	08:35
