= Partho Ghosh =

Indian film director (1949–2025)

- Born: 8 June 1949; Calcutta, West Bengal, India
- Died: 9 June 2025 (aged 76); Mumbai, Maharashtra, India
- Occupations: Director, screenwriter, producer
- Years active: 1980–2025

Partho Ghosh (8 June 1949 – 9 June 2025) was an Indian film director and producer in Bollywood. He also directed Bengali films. His successful films include 100 Days with Jackie Shroff and Madhuri Dixit, Teesra Kaun, Dalaal with Mithun Chakraborty, Agni-Sakshi with Jackie Shroff, Nana Patekar.

== Career ==
Ghosh started his career in Hindi cinema as an assistant director with small films (1985). His first big directorial film was 100 Days (1991). The film was a superhit. It was a remake of the Tamil film Nooravathu Naal. His movie, Dalaal (1993), was one of the highest-grossing movies in 1993. As of 2015, he had written and directed more than 15 movies. Another hit movie, Teesra Kaun? (1994), was the remake of the 1990 Malayalam film, No.20 Madras Mail, directed by Joshiy, starring Mohanlal in the lead role.

In 2010, Ghosh directed Ek Second... Jo Zindagi Badal De? and Rehmat Ali - 2010. Later, Ghosh wrote Agni Sakshi (Part 2) and Dalaal (Part 2). These two movies were expected in 2016. He also produced and directed several Bengali films and TV serials.

== Death ==
Partho Ghosh died from a heart attack at his residence in Madh Island, Mumbai, on 9 June 2025, at the age of 76. The news was confirmed by actress Rituparna Sengupta, who expressed her grief on social media. He was survived by his wife, Gauri Ghosh.

== Awards ==
Filmfare Awards

- 1997: Nominated: Filmfare Award for Best Director: Agni Sakshi

== Filmography ==
- 100 Days (1991)
- Geet (1992)
- Dalaal (1993)
- Kohra (1993)
- Teesra Kaun (1994)
- Mera Damad (1995)
- Agni-Sakshi (1996)
- Jeevan Yudh (1997)
- Jeeban Juddha (1997)
- Kaun Sachcha Kaun Jhootha (1997)
- Ghulam-E-Musthafa (1997)
- Yugpurush (1998)
- Khote Sikkey (1998)
- Sindur Khela (1999)
- Maseeha (2002)
- Surya (2002)
- Sitam (2005)
- Meri Life Mein Uski Wife (2009) (credited as Parto Ghosh)
- Rehmat Ali (2010)
- Ek Second... Jo Zindagi Badal De? (2010)
- Mausam Ikrar Ke Do Pal Pyar Ke (2018)
