= Ritesh =

Ritesh may refer to:

- Ritesh Deshmukh, Indian actor
- J. K. Rithesh (1973–2019), Indian actor and MP
- Ritesh Sidhwani (born 1971), Indian film producer
- Ritesh Seth, Indian billionaire and founder of Oyo Rooms
