= Kurbaan (1991 film) =

1991 Indian film by Deepak Bahry

- Audio Cassette Cover
- Directed by: Deepak Bahry
- Written by: Vinay Shukla (story)
- Produced by: Bubby Kent
- Starring: Salman Khan; Ayesha Jhulka; Sunil Dutt; Kabir Bedi
- Cinematography: Thomas A. Xavier
- Edited by: Mukhtar Ahmed
- Music by: Anand–Milind
- Distributed by: Rajshri Productions
- Release date: 31 May 1991
- Running time: 137 minutes
- Country: India
- Language: Hindi

Kurbaan (transl. Sacrificed) is an Indian Hindi-language action drama film directed by Deepak Bahry, starring Salman Khan and Ayesha Jhulka. The film, which was released on 31 May 1991, marked Ayesha Jhulka's Hindi debut. The film was successful at the box-office.

It is a love story with a backdrop of violence. The film had stalwarts Sunil Dutt and Kabir Bedi pitted against each other in the form of a dacoit and a top cop. Their children fall in love in each other and thus begins a major second confrontation between the two biggies amidst the obstacles faced by the young lovers in the course of their love against all odds.

== Plot ==
Maan Singh and the honest Prithvi Singh are engaged in a legal property dispute. When the Court gives verdict in Prithvi's favor, Maan Singh, in a fit of rage, hires a renowned bandit, Panna Singh, to eliminate Prithvi's entire family. Panna partly succeeds, and escapes wounded to a forest to escape Prithvi's fury. Prithvi loses his sister, his wife Gayatri and other members of his family due to the attack, and vows to avenge by killing Maan Singh's family in return, and he does it with partial success.

Maan Singh's brother, the Police Inspector Suraj Singh, who incidentally was Prithvi's trusted and best friend testifies against Prithvi in the case of carnage as his duty. This however upsets Prithvi to no end and puts an end to their friendship.

Prithvi escapes prison, plunders and takes over Panna Singh's gang and becomes Daku Prithvi Singh. The only survivors from his family are his daughter, Chanda, his former housekeeper Kakimaa, and her son, Himmat. He goes into hiding with his gang and family.

On the other side, Inspector Suraj Singh lives with his son, Akash. Years later, an educated Akash returns and while visiting a local fair spots an uneducated Chanda and they both fall in love with each other.

When their respective fathers find out, they are enraged and prohibit the young lovers from seeing each other by locking them up and their marriages are fixed elsewhere.

Both Akash and Chanda believe in their love, and stage their escape but are unaware of the consequences- another bloodbath at the hands of the vengeful Panna Singh is on the horizon, as he wants to kill Prithvi and his remaining family.

== Cast ==
- Sunil Dutt as Thakur/Dacait Prithvi Singh
- Kabir Bedi as Thakur Suraj Singh, Superintendent of Police
- Salman Khan as Akash Suraj Singh
- Ayesha Jhulka as Chanda Prithvi Singh
- Kunickaa Sadanand as Gayatri Prithvi Singh
- Swapna as Sharda , Suraj Singh,s wife
- Urmila Bhatt as Sujata Singh, Prithvi Singh,s mother
- Sudha Chandran as Hasina, Prithvi Singh,s sister
- Subbiraj as Prithvi,s lawyer Gupta
- Gulshan Grover as Himmat Singh
- Rohini Hattangadi as Kaaki Maa
- Bharat Kapoor as Thakur Maan Singh, Suraj Singh ka bhai
- Goga Kapoor as Dacait Panna Singh
- Surendra Pal as Lakhan Singh , Prithvi Singh, brother
- Rajesh Puri as Police Sub Inspector Moti
- Sunil Dhawan as Public Prosecutor Agarwal
- Kamaldeep as Judge PP Roy
- Ranjeet Special Appearance in the song "Deewano Se Poocho Mohabbat hai kya?"
- Sahila Chadha Special Appearance in the song "Zuba Zuba"

== Production ==
Salman Khan was apprehensive about dancing in the film.

== Soundtrack ==
#	Song	Singer(s)	Length
1	Aao Main Padhadoon Tumhain A, B, C	Abhijeet, Sarika Kapoor	08:24
2	Baitha Neeli Jheel Kinare	Suresh Wadkar, Anuradha Paudwal	07:27
3	Deewanon Se Poochho Mohabbat Hai Kya	Sukhwinder Singh	05:26
4	Main Tujhpe Kurbaan	Mohammad Aziz	06:21
5	Yeh Dharti Chand Sitare	Udit Narayan, Anuradha Paudwal	10:58
6	Zuba Zuba	Sapna Mukherjee	03:34
