= Waqt Hamara Hai =

- Directed by: Bharat Rangachary
- Written by: Rumi Jaffery
- Produced by: Sajid Nadiadwala
- Starring: Akshay Kumar; Suniel Shetty; Ayesha Jhulka; Mamta Kulkarni; Aruna Irani; Anupam Kher; Tiku Talsania
- Cinematography: Shashi Kabre
- Edited by: Deepak Wirkud; M. D. Worlikar; Vilas Ranade
- Music by: Nadeem-Shravan
- Production company: Nadiadwala Grandson Entertainment
- Release date: 2 July 1993
- Running time: 148 mins
- Country: India
- Language: Hindi
- Budget: ₹2.10 crore
- Box office: ₹5.05 crore ( India Nett)

Waqt Hamara Hai (transl. Time is ours) is a 1993 Indian romantic action comedy film. It was directed by Bharat Rangachary and produced by Sajid Nadiadwala. The stars were Akshay Kumar and Suniel Shetty, paired together for the first time.

== Plot ==
Vikas Sabkuchwala is a college student who repeatedly fails in his exams, much to the dismay of his father Dinanath Sabkuchwala. Dinanath is a miser. Vikas is in love with his colleague, Ayesha. Dinanath's accountant's nephew Sunil Chaudhary comes to Mumbai from Haryana for higher education. Sunil has been expelled from most of the colleges in Haryana due to his aggressive and violent nature. In Mumbai, his uncle gets him admitted into the same college as Vikas through Dinanath's recommendation. On the first day of his college term, his uncle dresses him up to make him look like a nerd so that he doesn't get into more fights. On his way to college, Sunil meets Mamta and helps her change her car's tyre by lifting up the car. Mamta is amazed by his strength and simplicity. In the college, Vikas tries to rag Sunil and in the canteen Sunil has a chat with Mamta, after which Sunil falls in love with Mamta. Vikas and Sunil have a gruesome fight one day but they become friends eventually when Sunil saves Vikas as he is about to fall from a building. Meanwhile, a group of terrorists led by Colonel Chikara are chased by the police and unwillingly leave a bag containing "Crypton", a nuclear missile product, in Vikas's car and flee. They eventually return to retrieve Crypton. Unable to find it, they kidnap Vikas and Ayesha and demand that Sunil deliver the product. Sunil finds Crypton and he leaves along with Mamta to deliver it. What happens later is what forms the crux of the story. Vikas and Sunil escape from Chikara leaving Ayesha and Mamata to do some of Chikaras work. After this they come back and kill quiet a few of Chikaras men and free Ayesha and Mamata. They successfully save Netaji from dying and they foil Colonel Chikara's plans. In the end, Chikara dies and everybody is safe.

== Cast ==
- Akshay Kumar as Vikas Kumar Sabkuchwala
- Suniel Shetty as Sunil Choudhary
- Ayesha Jhulka as Ayesha Virodhi
- Mamta Kulkarni as Mamta Virodhi
- Rami Reddy as Colonel Chikara
- Aruna Irani as Shanti
- Anupam Kher as Dinanath
- Arun Bakshi as Munim
- Tiku Talsania as Tejashwar Raj Vidrohi
- Shubha Khote as Chandramukhi Vidrohi
- Viju Khote as Inspector Surajmukhi
- Sudhir Dalvi as Netaji Ramgopal Verma
- Gavin Packard as Sambo
- Mahesh Anand as Major Shakti Kapoor
- Ragesh Asthana as Yogeshwar, Vikas's college friend
- Guddi Maruti as Bela, Ayesha's college friend

== Soundtrack ==
Waqt Hamara Hai

Soundtrack album by Nadeem-Shravan
- Released: 1993
- Recorded: 1992
- Venues: West Mumbai, Maharashtra
- Studio: B.R. Sound - N - Music
- Genre: Feature film soundtrack
- Length: 40:11
- Language: Hindi
- Label: Tips Music
- Producer: Sajid Nadiadwala

Nadeem-Shravan chronology
Krishan Avtaar (1993)	Waqt Hamara Hai (1993)	Rang (1993)

The music of the film was composed Nadeem-Shravan and the lyrics were penned by Sameer. The soundtrack was released in 1993 on Audio Cassette and Audio CD in Tips Music and also released in Serengeti Sirocco made in U.K. under license from Tips Music which consists of 7 songs. The full album is recorded by Asha Bhosle, Mohammed Aziz, Kumar Sanu, Udit Narayan, Vinod Rathod, Alka Yagnik, Kavita Krishnamurthy, Sudesh Bhosle, Mitali Choudhary and Anupam Kher.

#	Song	Singer
1.	"Kachchi Kali Kachnar Ki"	Kumar Sanu, Asha Bhosle
2.	"Haan Ji Haan Maaf Karna"	Kavita Krishnamurthy, Alka Yagnik, Anupam Kher
3.	"Mausam Hai Mastana"	Udit Narayan, Alka Yagnik
4.	"Maine Pee Ya Tune Pee"	Mohammed Aziz, Alka Yagnik
5.	"Tumko Dekha Aur Ho Gaya"	Kumar Sanu, Alka Yagnik
6.	"Kami Nahin Hai Ladkiyon Ki"	Udit Narayan, Vinod Rathod, Alka Yagnik, Mitali Choudhary
7.	"Yeh Waqt Hamara Hai"	Kumar Sanu, Alka Yagnik & Sudesh Bhosle

== Reception ==
The film was the first release of producer Sajid Nadiadwala after the death of his first wife, Divya Bharti. Therefore, it is dedicated to her memory. The film was a hit at the box-office.
