= Rakesh Sharma (cricketer) =

Indian-born Omani cricketer (born 1982)

Rakesh Sharma (born 24 January 1972 in Moradabad) is an Indian-born cricketer who played for the Oman national cricket team. He is a right-handed batsman and a right-arm medium-fast bowler.

== Career ==
Sharma has made several appearances as a batsman in the 2005 ICC Trophy including his List A debut during the game against Canada on 4 July 2005. During the 2005 ICC Trophy, he also played against the Netherlands on 2 July and Papua New Guinea on 5 July.

In 2013, Sharma coached the Oman U-19 team to a second place at the ACC U-19 Challenge Cup in Thailand.
