= Chandni (Bollywood actress) =

Indian actress

- Born: Navodita Sharma; Delhi, India
- Citizenship: Indian
- Occupation(s): Actress, Dancer
- Years active: 1991–1996 (actress)
- Spouse: Satish Sharma (m. 1996)
- Children: 2

Chandni is a former Indian actress, who has appeared in Bollywood movies like Sanam Bewafa (1991), Aaja Sanam (1992), Mr. Azaad (1994), Jai Kishen (1994), 1942: A Love Story (1994).

== Early life and career ==
Chandni's real name is Navodita Sharma. She was born in Delhi, India and spent her childhood in Delhi and Punjab. While she was still studying she saw an advertisement for a role in the movie Sanam Bewafa alongside Salman Khan who was a rage among girls after Maine Pyar Kiya's huge success. She filled the form for auditions and ultimately got the lead role. The film went to become the second biggest hit of the year after Saajan, however, she couldn't establish herself immediately due to her contract with Saawan Kumar Tak, the director & producer of the film.

By the time the contract was withdrawn, it was too late for her. Later she did second lead roles in the movies 1942 A Love Story, Mr. Azaad, Jai Kishan and more however she could not see the heights of success in her film career. She retired from Bollywood when she had no more film offers.

In 1994, Chandni married US-based Satish Sharma and then moved to Florida, USA.

She currently teaches Indian Dance in Orlando called C Studios. Chandni has organized events at Hard Rock in Universal Studios and House of Blues in Disney. She also organizes events with NBA team Orlando Magic called Bollywood Magic.

== Filmography ==
- Mr. Azaad (1994) (as Chandini) as Ropa
- Aaja Sanam (1994)
- Ikke Pe Ikka (1994) as Kavita
- Jai Kishen (1994) as Asha
- 1942: A Love Story (1993) as Chanda
- Dosti Ki Saugandh (1993)
- Jaan Se Pyaara (1992)
- Umar 55 Ki Dil Bachpan Ka (1992) as Aarti
- Henna (1991)
- Sanam Bewafa (1991) as Rukhsar Khan
