= Ayesha Jhulka =

Indian actress (born 1972)

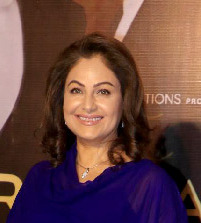
- Jhulka in 2025
- Born: 28 July 1972 (age 54); Srinagar, Jammu and Kashmir, India
- Occupations: Actress; entrepreneur
- Years active: 1990–2010; 2018–present
- Spouse: Sameer Vashi (m. 2003)

Ayesha Jhulka (born 28 July 1972) is an Indian actress who primarily appears in Hindi films, in addition to Bengali, Kannada and Telugu films. In a career spanning over three decades, she has worked in over 60 films.

Jhulka is best known for her portrayals in successful films such as, Kurbaan (1991), Jo Jeeta Wohi Sikandar (1992), Khiladi (1992), Meherbaan (1993), Dalaal (1993), Balmaa (1993), Waqt Hamara Hai (1993), Rang (1993), Sangram (1993), Jai Kishen (1994), Masoom (1996) and Hote Hote Pyar Ho Gaya (1999). For Khiladi and Jo Jeeta Wohi Sikandar, Jhulka received a Filmfare Award for Best Female Debut nomination.

After a hiatus, she went onto work in films like - Socha Na Tha (2005), Umrao Jaan (2006), Ada... A Way of Life (2010) and Genius (2018). Jhulka made her web debut with Hush Hush (2022) and has since appeared in Happy Family: Conditions Apply (2023).

== Early life ==
Jhulka was born on 28 July 1972 in Srinagar, Jammu and Kashmir. Her father Wing Commander Inder Kumar Jhulka, is a retired Air Force officer. Her mother Sneh Jhulka, is a costume designer who has worked in films such as Dalaal and Vishwavidhata. Jhulka worked as a child artist in the 1983 film Kaise Kaise Log.

== Career ==
=== Breakthrough and success (1990-1993) ===
After making her acting debut with the Telugu film Neti Siddhartha in 1990, Jhulka made her Hindi film debut opposite Salman Khan with the 1991 film Kurbaan, a box office success. The same year, she appeared in Meet Mere Man Ke, Hai Meri Jaan and the Bengali film Katha Dilam.

Jhulka had four films released in 1992. She first appeared in Mashooq opposite Ayub Khan. Jhulka's portrayal of a college prankster in Khiladi opposite Akshay Kumar, marked a turning point in her career. Further success came with Jo Jeeta Wohi Sikandar opposite Aamir Khan, where she portrayed a college student. For both of these films, she received a nomination for the Filmfare Award for Best Female Debut. Anaam was her last release of the year.

Jhulka established herself and went onto work in ten films in 1993. She appeared in films like Kohra, Kaise Kaise Rishte, Balmaa, Meherbaan and Aulad Ke Dushman. She received praise for portraying a village belle in Sangram opposite Ajay Devgn, and for her portrayals in Waqt Hamara Hai and Dil Ki Baazi opposite Akshay Kumar. Jhulka appeared in Dalaal, one of the year's highest grossers opposite Mithun Chakraborty. She also won praise for Rang alongside Divya Bharti and Kamal Sadanah.

=== Further work and setback (1994-2000) ===
In 1994, Jhulka appeared in Brahma and Ekka Raja Rani opposite Govinda, in Jai Kishen opposite Kumar and in Maha Shaktishaali. She then played the lead in the 1995 film Aashique Mastaane. In 1996, she appeared in Masoom and Muqaddar opposite Mithun Chakraborty.

Jhulka had four releases in 1997, including Suraj and Ghoonghat. The same year, she received praise for her portrayal in Chachi 420 opposite Kamal Haasan. Her final film of the year was Vishwavidhaata opposite Jackie Shroff. Her films in 1998 include - Dand Nayak, Kannada film Kanasalu Neene Manasalu Neene and Himmatwala opposite Chakraborty.

== Personal life ==
Jhulka met construction tycoon Sameer Vashi through her mother. Jhulka married Vashi in 2003. The couple decided not to have any children.

== Filmography ==
=== Films ===
Year	Title	Role	Notes	Ref.
1983	Kaise Kaise Log	Pooja	Child artist	
1990	Neti Siddhartha	Basanthi	Telugu film	
1991	Kurbaan	Chanda Singh		
1991	Meet Mere Man Ke			
1991	Hai Meri Jaan	Neelam		
1991	Katha Dilam	Anita Chatterjee	Bengali film	
1992	Mashooq	Nisha Rai		
1992	Khiladi	Neelam Choudhury	Nominated - Filmfare Award for Best Female Debut	
1992	Jo Jeeta Wohi Sikandar	Anjali	Nominated - Filmfare Award for Best Female Debut	
1992	Anaam	Meghna		
1993	Kohra	Nisha		
1993	Kaise Kaise Rishte	Pooja		
1993	Balmaa	Madhu		
1993	Meherbaan	Chanda		
1993	Sangram	Pallavi K. Singh		
1993	Dalaal	Roopali		
1993	Rang	Pooja Malhotra		
1993	Waqt Hamara Hai	Ayesha		
1993	Dil Ki Baazi	Aarti		
1993	Aulad Ke Dushman	Shalu Kumar		
1994	Brahma	Asha		
1994	Ekka Raja Rani	Barkha		
1994	Jai Kishen	Asha		
1994	Maha Shaktishaali	Poonam		
1995	Akele Hum Akele Tum	Award presenter	Cameo appearance	
1995	Aashique Mastaane	Malti		
1996	Masoom	Chanda		
1996	Muqaddar	Meena		
1996	Apne Dam Par	Herself	Special appearance in song	
1997	Chachi 420	Ratna		
1997	Vishwavidhaata	Radha Khanna		
1997	Judge Mujrim	Dancer	Special appearance in song "Laila O Laila"	
1997	Suraj	Ramkali	Hindi-Urdu film	
1997	Ghoonghat			
1998	Dand Nayak	Naina		
1998	Kanasalu Neene Manasalu Neene	Chandana	Kannada film	
1998	Deewana Hoon Pagal Nahi	Devyani		
1998	Barood	Dancer	Special appearance	
1998	Himmatwala	Radha		
1999	Purush	Herself	Special appearance in song "Kahani Kismat Ki"	
1999	Phool Aur Aag	Herself	Special appearance in song "Main Gaaon Dil Gaaye"	
1999	Hote Hote Pyar Ho Gaya	Shobha		
1999	Kohram	Sweety		
1999	Kahani Kismat Ki			
1999	Asha Amar Asha	Swapna	Bengali film	
2000	Khalsa Mero Roop Hai Khaas	Channi		
2000	Shikaar	Anju Gupta		
2001	Hadh: Life on the Edge of Death			
2001	Censor	Shakeela		
2002	Amma	Roopa		
2003	Aanch	Devangi M. Thakur		
2004	Run	Esha Varma		
2004	Jai	Jai's Mother	Telugu film	
2005	Socha Na Tha	Namita Oberoi		
2005	Double Cross	Sonia		
2006	Jackpot		Kannada film	
2006	Umrao Jaan	Khurshid Jaan		
2006	Janani	Urmila		
2006	Rakate Lekhichi Naa	Ritu Mahapatra	Odia film	
2009	Keshyog			
2010	Ada... A Way of Life	Amina A. Anand		
2018	Genius	Nandini's mother		

=== Television ===
Year	Title	Role	Notes	Ref.
2003	Kabhie Kabhie	Devpriya / Devjani	Episode: "Vansh"	
2025	Celebrity MasterChef	Contestant	10th place	

=== Web series ===
Year	Title	Role	Notes	Ref.
2022	Hush Hush	Meera Yadav	Debut series	
2023	Happy Family: Conditions Apply	Pallavi "Pallu" Dholakia		

== Accolades ==
Year	Award	Category	Work	Result	Ref.
1993	38th Filmfare Awards	Best Female Debut	Khiladi & Jo Jeeta Wohi Sikandar	Nominated	
2023	23rd Indian Television Academy Awards	Popular Actress - OTT	Hush Hush	TBA	
2023	23rd Indian Television Academy Awards	Popular Actress - OTT	Happy Family: Conditions Apply	TBA	

== See also ==
- List of Indian film actresses
