= Dimple Kapadia filmography =

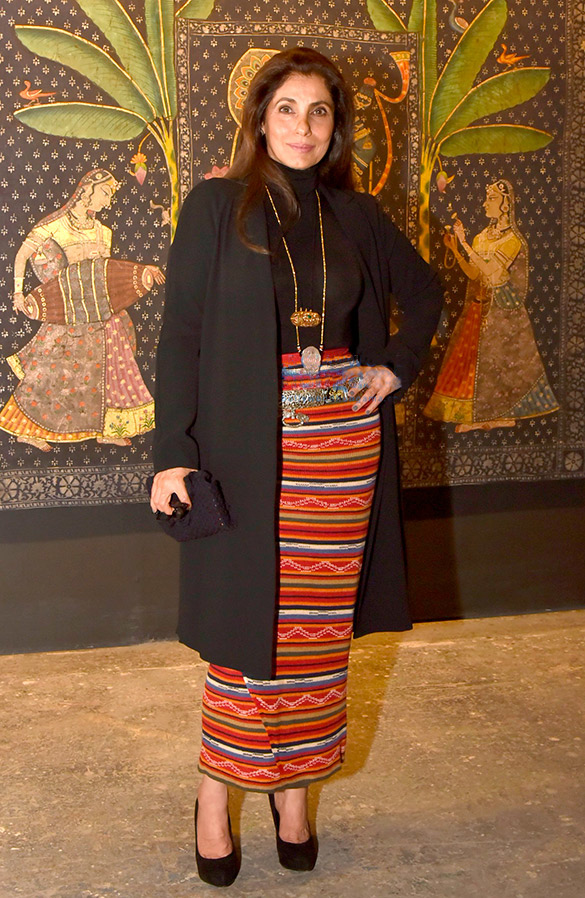
Kapadia at the Pichvai Exhibition in New Delhi, 2018

Dimple Kapadia is an Indian actress who predominantly appears in Hindi films. She was discovered by Raj Kapoor at age 14, who gave her the title role in his teen romance Bobby (1973), opposite his son Rishi Kapoor. The film became a massive commercial success and made her an overnight star. Her role as a Christian teenager from Goa established her as a youth fashion icon and won her the Filmfare Award for Best Actress. Kapadia retired from acting following her marriage to Indian actor Rajesh Khanna earlier in 1973, and returned to the film industry in 1984, after her separation from Khanna. The release of her comeback film, Saagar, was delayed, with Zakhmi Sher becoming the second film of her career. Released in 1985, Saagar earned her a second Best Actress award at Filmfare, and she went on to establish herself as one of the leading actresses of Hindi cinema in the 1980s and early 1990s. The early roles she played following her return included the Hitchcockian thriller Aitbaar (1985), for which she received positive reviews, and the commercially successful action films Arjun (1985) and Janbaaz (1986). During this period, she acted in several films in South India, which she admitted to having made for financial gain and dismissed their quality.

Many of Kapadia's early roles relied on her perceived beauty, and she would struggle to be taken seriously as an actress. She made a decision to accept more serious roles, and won acclaim for her role in the marital drama Kaash (1987). Financial success came with films like Insaniyat Ke Dushman (1987), Insaaf (1987), in which she played double roles; the controversial revenge saga Zakhmi Aurat (1988), in which she played an avenging rape victim; and Ram Lakhan (1989). She started the next decade by venturing into neorealist art films, known in India as parallel cinema, including Drishti (1990), Lekin... (1990), and Rudaali (1993). All these films won her critical praise, and her role as a professional mourner in the latter earned her a National Film Award for Best Actress and a Filmfare Critics Award for Best Actress. She further essayed character parts in Prahaar (1991), Angaar (1992), Gardish (1993), and Krantiveer (1994), which garnered her a fourth Filmfare Award, in the Best Supporting Actress category.

Kapadia became selective about her roles, and her work over the following decades was infrequent, with substantial gaps. She played the supporting part of a divorced alcoholic in Dil Chahta Hai (2001) and was noted for her portrayal of the title role, a middle-aged professor, in the American production Leela (2002). In both films, she played women who are the object of younger men's desire, in roles written especially for her. Some of her later film credits include leading roles in Hum Kaun Hai? (2004), Pyaar Mein Twist (2005), Phir Kabhi (2008), Tum Milo Toh Sahi (2010), and her supporting roles included Being Cyrus (2005), Luck by Chance (2009), Dabangg (2010), Cocktail (2012) and Finding Fanny (2014). While Dabangg was one of the highest-grossing Hindi films of all-time, her roles in Luck by Chance and Finding Fanny earned her two Filmfare nominations. Kapadia was cast by Christopher Nolan in his action thriller Tenet, which was the fourth-highest grossing film of 2020 and earned her positive reviews.

== Film ==
Key
†	Denotes films that have not yet been released

Table containing films with Dimple Kapadia
Year	Title	Role	Director(s)	Notes	Ref.
1973	Bobby	Bobby J. Braganza	Raj Kapoor	Filmfare Award for Best Actress	
1984	Zakhmi Sher	Anu Gupta	Pradeep Sharma		
1984	Manzil Manzil	Seema Malhotra	Nasir Hussain		
1985	Lava	Rinku Dayal	Ravindra Peepat		
1985	Aitbaar	Neha Khanna	Mukul S. Anand		
1985	Arjun	Geeta Sahani	Rahul Rawail		
1985	Pataal Bhairavi	Yaskankya	K. Bapayya		
1985	Saagar	Mona D'Silva	Ramesh Sippy	Filmfare Award for Best Actress	
1986	Vikram	Princess Inimaasi	Rajasekhar	Tamil film	
1986	Janbaaz	Reshma Rai	Feroz Khan		
1986	Allah Rakha	Julie Khera	Ketan Desai		
1987	Insaniyat Ke Dushman	Shilpa	Rajkumar Kohli		
1987	Insaaf	Sonia/Dr. Sarita (Note: Kapadia played dual roles in the film.)	Mukul S. Anand		
1987	Kaash	Pooja	Mahesh Bhatt		
1988	Saazish	Meena	Rajkumar Kohli		
1988	Mera Shikar	Bijli	Keshu Ramsay		
1988	Gunahon Ka Faisla	Shanu/Durga (Note: Kapadia played dual roles in the film)	Shibu Mitra		
1988	Bees Saal Baad	Nisha	Rajkumar Kohli		
1988	Aakhri Adaalat	Rima Kapoor	Rajiv Mehra		
1988	Kabzaa	Dr. Smita	Mahesh Bhatt		
1988	Mahaveera	Dolly	Naresh Saigal		
1988	Zakhmi Aurat	Kiran Dutt	Avtar Bhogal		
1988	Ganga Tere Desh Mein	Princess	Vijay Reddy		
1989	Ram Lakhan	Geeta Kashyap	Subhash Ghai		
1989	Touhean	Deepika Srivastava	Madan Joshi		
1989	Batwara	Jinna	J.P. Dutta		
1989	Sikka	Shobha	K. Bapayya		
1989	Shehzaade	Aarti	Raj N. Sippy		
1989	Ladaai	Billoo	Deepak Shivdasani		
1989	Pati Parmeshwar	Tara/Durga	Madan Joshi		
1989	Pyar Ke Naam Qurbaan	Rajkumari Devika Singh	Babbar Subhash		
1990	Kali Ganga	Ganga	Raj N. Sippy		
1990	Aag Ka Gola	Aarti	David Dhawan		
1990	Drishti	Sandhya	Govind Nihalani		
1991	Lekin...	Reva	Gulzar	Nominated—Filmfare Award for Best Actress	
1991	Prahaar: The Final Attack	Kiran	Nana Patekar		
1991	Narsimha	Anita V. Rastogi	N. Chandra		
1991	Mast Kalandar	Prit Kaur	Rahul Rawail		
1991	Haque	Varsha B. Singh	Harish Bhosle		
1991	Khoon Ka Karz	Tara K. Lele	Mukul S. Anand		
1991	Dushman Devta	Gauri	Anil Ganguly		
1991	Ajooba	Rukhsana Khan	Shashi Kapoor; Gennady Vasilyev		
1991	Ranbhoomi	Radha	Deepak Sareen		
1992	Karm Yodha	Namita	Dayal Nihalani		
1992	Angaar	Mili	Shashilal K. Nair		
1992	Dil Aashna Hai	Barkha	Hema Malini		
1992	Maarg	Uma	Mahesh Bhatt		
1993	Rudaali	Shanichari	Kalpana Lajmi	National Film Award for Best Actress; Filmfare Critics Award for Best Actress	
1993	Gunaah	Kavita Sharma	Mahesh Bhatt		
1993	Aaj Kie Aurat	Roshni Verma	Avtar Bhogal		
1993	Gardish	Shanti	Priyadarshan	Nominated—Filmfare Award for Best Supporting Actress	
1993	Antareen	The Woman	Mrinal Sen	Bengali film	
1994	Pathreela Raasta	Gayatri Sanyal	Ajay Kashyap		
1994	Krantiveer	Megha Dixit	Mehul Kumar	Filmfare Award for Best Supporting Actress	
1997	Share Bazaar		Manmohan Sabir	Cameo appearance	
1997	Agni Chakra	Rani	Amit Suryavanshi		
1997	Mrityudata	Janki Ghayal	Mehul Kumar		
1998	2001: Do Hazaar Ek	Roshni Sharma	Raj N. Sippy		
1999	Laawaris	Kavita Saxena	Shrikant Sharma		
1999	Hum Tum Pe Marte Hain	Devyani Chopra	Nabh Kumar		
2001	Dil Chahta Hai	Tara Jaiswal	Farhan Akhtar		
2002	Leela	Leela	Somnath Sen		
2004	Hum Kaun Hai?	Sandra Williams	Ravi Shankar Sharma		
2005	Pyaar Mein Twist	Sheetal Arya	Hriday Shetty		
2006	Being Cyrus	Katy Sethna	Homi Adajania		
2006	Banaras	Gayatri	Pankaj Parashar		
2008	Jumbo	Devi	Kompin Kemgumnird	Voice only (animation film)	
2009	Phir Kabhi	Ganga	V. K. Prakash		
2009	Luck by Chance	Neena Walia	Zoya Akhtar	Nominated—Filmfare Award for Best Supporting Actress	
2010	Tum Milo Toh Sahi	Delshad Nanji	Kabir Sadanand		
2010	Dabangg	Naini P. Pandey	Abhinav Kashyap		
2011	Patiala House	Mrs. Kahlon	Nikhil Advani		
2012	Bombay Mittayi	Mrs. Mansoor	Umar Karikkad	Malayalam film	
2012	Cocktail	Kavita Kapoor	Homi Adajania		
2013	What the Fish	Sudha Mishra	Gurmeet Singh		
2014	The Shaukeens		Abhishek Sharma	Cameo appearance	
2014	Gollu Aur Pappu	Amma	Kabir Sadanand		
2014	Finding Fanny	Rosalina "Rosie" Eucharistica	Homi Adajania	English film. Nominated—Filmfare Award for Best Supporting Actress	
2015	Welcome Back	Poonam / Maharani Padmavati	Anees Bazmee		
2019	Dabangg 3	Naini P. Pandey	Prabhu Deva		
2020	Angrezi Medium	Sampada Kohli	Homi Adajania		
2020	Tenet	Priya Singh	Christopher Nolan	American film	
2022	A Thursday	Prime Minister of India Maya Rajguru	Behzad Khambata		
2022	Brahmāstra: Part One – Shiva	Savitri Devi	Ayan Mukherjee		
2023	Pathaan	Nandini Grewal	Siddharth Anand		
2023	Tu Jhoothi Main Makkaar	Renu Arora	Luv Ranjan		
2024	Teri Baaton Mein Aisa Uljha Jiya	Urmila Shukla	Amit Joshi; Aradhana Sah		
2024	Murder Mubarak	Cookie Katoch	Homi Adajania		
2024	Go Noni Go	Noni	Sonal Dabral		
2026	Jab Khuli Kitaab	Anusuya Nautiyal	Saurabh Shukla		

== Television ==
Year	Title	Role	Ref.
2021	Tandav	Anuradha Kishore	
2023	Saas, Bahu Aur Flamingo	Savitri	

== Bibliography ==
- Adarkar, Vivek (2003). Tomassini, Christine; Schwartz, Carol (eds.). Magill's Cinema Annual. Gale Research International, Limited. ISBN 978-1-55862-459-7.
- Ausaja, S. M. M. (2009). Bollywood in Posters. Om Books International. p. 1993. ISBN 978-81-87108-55-9. Archived from the original on 17 April 2023.
- Bumiller, Elisabeth (1 June 1991). May You Be the Mother of a Hundred Sons. Penguin Books India. ISBN 978-0-14-015671-3.
- Chopra, Anupama (2014). Freeze Frame. Om Books International. ISBN 978-93-81607-11-4. Archived from the original on 17 April 2023.
- Dasgupta, Rohit K.; Datta, Sangeeta (2018). 100 Essential Indian Films. Rowman & Littlefield. ISBN 978-1-4422-7799-1. Archived from the original on 17 April 2023.
- Derné, Steve (2000). Movies, Masculinity, and Modernity: An Ethnography of Men's Filmgoing in India. Greenwood Press. ISBN 978-0-313-31287-8. Archived from the original on 17 April 2023.
- Joshi, Priya (2015). Bollywood's India: A Public Fantasy. Columbia University Press. ISBN 978-0-231-53907-4. Archived from the original on 17 April 2023.
- Mazumdar, Ranjani (2017). "The Legal Unspeakable: Rape in 1980s Bombay Cinema". In Dutt, Bishnupriya; Reinelt, Janelle; Sahai, Shrinkhla (eds.). Gendered Citizenship: Manifestations and Performance. Springer. pp. 163–179. ISBN 978-3-319-59093-6. Archived from the original on 17 April 2023.
- Mubarki, Meraj Ahmed (2016). Filming Horror: Hindi Cinema, Ghosts and Ideologies. SAGE Publications India. ISBN 978-93-5150-873-1. Archived from the original on 17 April 2023.
- Murali, Sharanya (2017). "Finding Femininity: Homi Adajania and Representations of Urban Womanhood". In Iqbal Viswamohan, Aysha; John, Vimal Mohan (eds.). Behind the Scenes: Contemporary Bollywood Directors and Their Cinema. SAGE Publications India. pp. 291–307. ISBN 978-93-86062-40-6. Archived from the original on 17 April 2023.
- Patel, Bhaichand (2016). Bollywood's Top 20: Superstars of Indian Cinema. Penguin UK. ISBN 978-81-8475-598-5.
- Rajadhyaksha, Ashish; Willemen, Paul (1999). Encyclopedia of Indian Cinema. Routledge. ISBN 978-1-135-94325-7.
- Siṃha, Hara Mandira (2000). Hindi filmography: 1981–1999, Volume 2. Satinder Kaur. Archived from the original on 17 April 2023.
- Virdi, Jyotika (2003). The Cinematic ImagiNation [sic]: Indian Popular Films as Social History. Rutgers University Press. pp. 140–143. ISBN 978-0-8135-3191-5.
