= Dimple Kapadia =

Indian actress (born 1957)

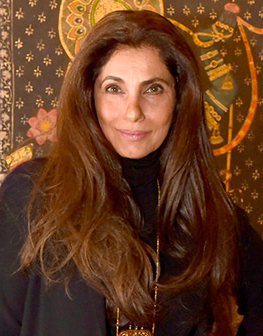
- Kapadia in 2018
- Born: 8 June 1957 (age 69); Bombay, India
- Occupation: Actress
- Years active: 1973; 1984–present
- Works: Full list
- Spouse(s): Rajesh Khanna (m. 1973; sep. 1982; d. 2012)
- Children: Twinkle Khanna; Rinke Khanna
- Relatives: Khanna family

Dimple Kapadia (born 8 June 1957) is an Indian actress predominantly appearing in Hindi films. Born and raised in Mumbai by wealthy parents, she aspired to become an actress from a young age and received her first opportunity through her father's efforts to launch her in the film industry. She was discovered at age 14 by the filmmaker Raj Kapoor, who cast her in the title role of his teen romance Bobby (1973), which opened to major commercial success and gained her wide public recognition. Shortly before the film's release in 1973, she married the actor Rajesh Khanna and quit acting. Their daughters, Twinkle and Rinke Khanna, both briefly worked as actresses in their youth. Kapadia returned to films in 1984, two years after her separation from Khanna. Her comeback film Saagar, which was released a year later, revived her career. Both Bobby and Saagar won her Filmfare Awards for Best Actress. Through her work over the next decade, she established herself as one of Hindi cinema's leading actresses.

While her initial roles often relied on her perceived beauty and sex appeal, Kapadia was keen to challenge herself and expand her range. She was among the first actresses who starred in women-centred Hindi action films but found greater favour with critics when she took on more dramatic roles in both mainstream and neorealist parallel cinema. Appearing in films ranging from marital dramas to literary adaptations, she played troubled women sometimes deemed reflective of her personal experience, and received acclaim for her performances in Kaash (1987), Drishti (1990), Lekin... (1991), and Rudaali (1993). For her role as a professional mourner in Rudaali, she won the National Film Award for Best Actress and a Filmfare Critics Award. She also had supporting roles in the crime dramas Prahaar (1991), Angaar (1992), Gardish (1993) and Krantiveer (1994), the latter securing her another Filmfare Award.

Starting from the mid-1990s, Kapadia became more selective about her work, and her screen appearances in the following decades were fewer. She was noted for her portrayal of middle-aged, complicated women courted by younger men in Dil Chahta Hai (2001) and the American production Leela (2002). Her later credits include leading roles in Hum Kaun Hai? (2004), Pyaar Mein Twist (2005), Phir Kabhi (2008), Tum Milo Toh Sahi (2010) and What the Fish (2013), but she attained more success with character roles in Being Cyrus (2006), Luck by Chance (2009), Dabangg (2010), Cocktail (2012) and Finding Fanny (2014). Some of these roles were cited in the media as a departure from the regular portrayals of women of her age in Hindi films. Roles in the Hollywood thriller Tenet (2020), action film Pathaan (2023), as well as the streaming series Saas, Bahu Aur Flamingo (2023), brought her further recognition.

== Background and personal life ==
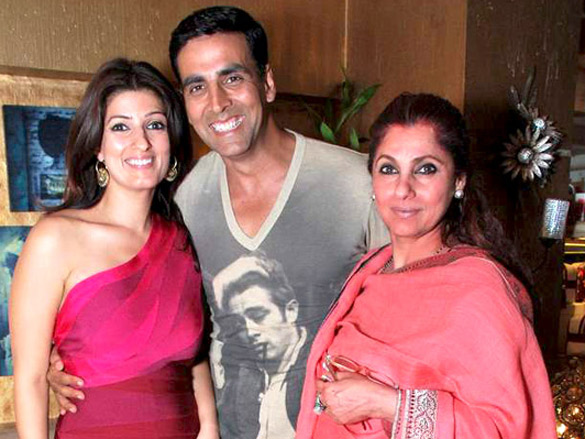
Kapadia (right) with her daughter Twinkle Khanna and her son-in-law Akshay Kumar

Dimple Kapadia was born on 8 June 1957 in Bombay to Gujarati businessman Chunibhai Kapadia and his wife Bitti, who was known as "Betty". Chunibhai was from a wealthy Ismaili Khoja family, whose members had "embraced Hinduism" while still regarding Aga Khan as their religious mentor. (Note: This was originally reported by Sumit Mitra in India Today on 20 November 1985, describing Kapadia's family as a "wealthy Khoja family, which embraced Hinduism only with Chunibhai's father, Laljibhai, and which accepts the Agha Khan as its religious mentor even now". Similar information was repeated by Kaveree Bamzai in Open magazine on 4 October 2019 in a piece about Kapadia's daughter Twinkle Khanna, claiming Chunibhai's family to be of "lapsed Ismaili Khojas". In the 2014 book When I Was 25: The Leaders Look Back, the author Shaili Chopra, who interviewed Kapadia for a chapter in this book, quoted the aforementioned article by India Today in relation to her parents' story and noted that Kapadia "wouldn't talk about it much".) Pakistani singer Faisal Kapadia was Chunibhai's cousin. Bitti was a practising Ismaili. As an infant, Dimple was given the name Ameena (literally, "honest" or "trustworthy" in Arabic) by Aga Khan III, by which she was never referred to. She is the eldest of four children; her siblings, all of whom have died, were sisters Simple (also an actress) and Reem, and a brother, Suhail.

The family resided in the Bombay suburb Santacruz, where Kapadia studied at St Joseph's Convent High School. She described herself as having matured quickly, and often made friends with children older than herself. Her father was disowned by his conservative family after she was cast for her first film Bobby in 1971. At age 15, she married the actor Rajesh Khanna, then aged 30, after a short courtship. Having been a fan of Khanna, she later said marrying him was the "biggest high" of her life during this period. The wedding was performed according to Arya Samaj rites in her father's bungalow in Juhu on 27 March 1973 and was followed by a grand reception event attended by thousands later in the evening—six months before the release of Bobby. At her husband's behest, Kapadia quit acting following the marriage. She gave birth to two daughters, Twinkle (born 1974) and Rinke (born 1977).

Kapadia separated from Khanna in April 1982 and returned with her two daughters to her parents' house. She returned to acting two years later. In a 1985 interview with India Today, she remarked, "The life and happiness in our house came to an end the day I and Rajesh got married", saying her unhappy marital experience had included inequality and her husband's infidelity, and called their marriage "a farce". The hostility between Khanna and Kapadia, who were never officially divorced, subsided over the years; despite not having ever reunited, they were seen together at parties; Kapadia acted opposite Khanna in his unreleased film Jai Shiv Shankar in 1990 and campaigned for his election to the Indian National Congress a year later. Their daughters similarly became actresses and, after marriage, retired from acting. The elder daughter Twinkle is married to the actor Akshay Kumar. Asked in Filmfare in 2000 whether she would want to remarry, Kapadia said: "I'm very happy and content ... once was more than enough". Khanna fell ill in early 2012, and Kapadia stayed by his side and took care of him until his death on 18 July that year. She was with him when he died and said his loss, along with the deaths of her sister Simple and her brother, left her feeling "truly abandoned".

Kapadia is an art lover and has experimented with painting and sculpture. In 1998, she started a company called The Faraway Tree, which sells candles that she designs. Having been a candle enthusiast and finding candle-making therapeutic, she went to Wales and took a workshop with Blackwood-based candle artist David Constable. According to the Indian press, Kapadia's business venture has inspired other candle enthusiasts to start similar businesses. Her candles were presented and offered for sale at a number of exhibitions.

== Career ==
=== Debut and stardom (1973) ===
Kapadia, who was an avid movie viewer, aspired to be an actor since childhood. Her acting career was initiated by her father, who socialised with film-industry professionals and frequented parties hosted by screenwriter Anjana Rawail. Through his contacts, Dimple was almost cast to play the younger version of Vyjayanthimala's character in H. S. Rawail's Sunghursh (1968), but was eventually rejected because she looked older than the part called for. After she turned down an offer to play the protagonist in Hrishikesh Mukherjee's Guddi in 1970, another opportunity arose in 1971 when Raj Kapoor was looking for a young, new female lead for his planned teen romance. Munni Dhawan, a close friend of Kapoor, suggested he consider Kapadia, having been acquainted with her father. In June that year, at the age of 14, Kapadia performed a screen test for the film on the sets of one of Kapoor's productions. Impressed with her spontaneity and improvisation, Kapoor cast her in the part. The film, which was named Bobby, was released in September 1973. It starred Kapoor's son Rishi Kapoor as Raj Nath, the son of a wealthy Hindu businessman, and Kapadia was given the title role of Bobby Braganza, the teenage daughter of a Christian fisherman from Goa. The story follows the love affair between Raj and Bobby in the face of his parents' disapproval of their relationship due to class prejudice.

Bobby was a major commercial success—India's highest-grossing film of the year and ultimately second-earning film of the decade—and Kapadia was lauded for her performance, which won her the Filmfare Award for Best Actress (tied with Jaya Bhaduri for Abhimaan). Qurratulain Hyder of The Illustrated Weekly of India noted she acted with "natural ease and freshness". Several of Kapadia's lines in the film became popular, particularly, "Mujhse dosti karoge?" ("Will you be my friend?"), and the "miniskirts, midriff-baring polka dot shirts, and fabled red bikini" she wore made her a youth fashion icon in India. Consequently, polka-dotted dresses were often referred to as "Bobby Print". Bhawana Somaaya of The Hindu credits Kapadia with starting the merchandising of film memorabilia in India, and Mukesh Khosla of The Tribune said Bobby established her as a "cult figure" because she led the fashion trends. In later years, Kapadia credited Raj Kapoor for her development as an actor: "The sum total of me today as an actress, whatever I am, is Raj Kapoor". In 2008, Raja Sen from the web portal Rediff.com ranked her performance in Bobby as the fourth-best female debut of all time in Hindi cinema: "An elfin little girl with big, lovely eyes, nobody quite portrayed innocence as memorably as Dimple in her first outing. She was candid, striking, and a true natural ... here was a girl who would redefine glamour and grace, and make it look very, very easy indeed."

=== Comeback and early fluctuations (1984–1986) ===
Kapadia returned to acting in 1984, two years after her separation from Khanna, saying she had a personal need to prove her own capabilities to herself. Over the next decade, she became one of the leading female actors in Hindi cinema. Her first post-hiatus film was Saagar; a mutual friend had notified the director Ramesh Sippy about Kapadia's willingness to return to acting, and she was invited to audition for the part. She considered her screen test unsuccessful because she was "literally shivering" while performing it, but Sippy cast her to play the lead part opposite her Bobby co-star Rishi Kapoor. Scripted with her in mind, the film was intended to be her comeback vehicle but its one-year delay meant several of her later projects were released before, the first of which was Zakhmi Sher (1984).

Other films released before Saagar include Manzil Manzil (1984), Aitbaar (1985) and Arjun (1985). Kapadia appeared opposite Sunny Deol in Manzil Manzil, a drama that was directed by Nasir Hussain. While speaking of her positive experience during the making of the film, she felt uncomfortable performing the routine song-and-dance nature of the part. Her work was deemed ineffective by Trade Guide, and The Illustrated Weekly of India reported her career prospects entirely depended upon the fortunes of her next few projects. Kapadia received positive reviews for her part in Mukul Anand's Hitchcockian thriller Aitbaar. She starred as Neha, a wealthy young woman whose greedy husband (Raj Babbar) plots to murder her. Discussing her performance, she said she was "a bag of nerves" while filming, which benefitted her performance because her own state coincided with her character's inner turmoil. She was cast opposite Sunny Deol for a second time in Rahul Rawail's action film Arjun; it was her first commercial success since her return to films.

Saagar premiered in August 1985 and was controversial for several scenes featuring Kapadia, including one in which she was seen topless for less than a second. The film was chosen as India's official entry to the 58th Academy Awards for Best Foreign Language Film. Kapadia's performance as Mona D'Silva, a young Catholic woman who is torn between her friend (Kamal Haasan) and the man she loves (Kapoor), reestablished her position in the film industry and won her a second Best Actress award at the Filmfare Awards. A reviewer in Asiaweek appreciated the film for its "polished narration and masterly technique" and labelled Kapadia "a delight". According to Rediff.com, Kapadia "performed solidly and memorably, grounding the two male leads and making the film work". A 1993 issue of India Today wrote: "Saagar was in many ways a paean to her incredible beauty. She looked ravishing: auburn hair, classical face, deep eyes, an aura of sensuality. It was clear she was back."

Feroz Khan's Janbaaz (1986), which is about a man fighting drug addiction, became known for a love scene in which Kapadia and male lead Anil Kapoor share a kiss, a rarity in Hindi cinema at the time. The same year, she acted opposite Kamal Haasan in her first regional film, Vikram, a Tamil-language sci-fi feature, in the minor role of Inimaasi, a young princess who falls in love with Vikram (Haasan). At that time, she worked in numerous Hindi films made by producers from South India, including Pataal Bhairavi, which she detested. She later confessed to accepting these roles for financial gain rather than artistic merit: "I shudder even now when I think of those films. As an artiste I got totally corrupted."

=== Kaash and mainstream success (1987–1989) ===
"After three years of near-frustration in my career, I bagged Mahesh Bhatt's film Kaash. This film changed my whole outlook. After all those professional brickbats, when Mahesh asked me to do his film I think I got one of the biggest highs of my career. Working for Mahesh has been the most satisfying phase in my entire career as an actress. If I can imbibe even 25% of what he has taught me, I feel I will be made as an artiste."

— Kapadia in 1987 on the experience of making Kaash

Kapadia's career took further shape in 1987 and, according to film journalist Firoze Rangoonwala, she was the most sought-after actress in the film industry that year. She appeared in Rajkumar Kohli's Insaniyat Ke Dushman and Mukul Anand's Insaaf; both action films that were popular with audiences. Insaniyat Ke Dushman featured Kapadia as part of an ensemble, and Rangoonwala attributed its commercial success to its all-star cast and "bulky melodrama". In Insaaf, she played the dual role of unrelated lookalikes: Sonia, a club dancer and Dr. Sarita, a physician.

Later in the year, she played Pooja in Mahesh Bhatt's marital drama Kaash. Kapadia and Jackie Shroff starred as an estranged couple who, during a relentless legal battle over the custody of their only son, learn that the boy has brain tumour and reunite to spend the last months of his life as a family. Before filming began, she called it the most serious artistic challenge of her career. Bhatt cast Kapadia because he was aware of her own marital experience and later revealed that during the shooting she had grown increasingly invested in the story, so much that after a point he could not differentiate her from Pooja as she "became the character". Kapadia's performance was praised by critics. Pritish Nandy, the editor of The Illustrated Weekly of India, asserted: "Dimple achieves the impossible. Bereft of her glitzy make-up, glamour and filmi mannerisms, she comes alive as never before: beautiful, sensitive, intense. You almost feel you've discovered a new actress on the screen." In later years, The Times of India listed it as one of Kapadia's best performances, noting her "immense strength as a performer", and Sukanya Verma wrote of the "stoic determination and touching vulnerability" with which Pooja was played, calling the outcome "extremely believable and sympathetic at once". Bhawana Somaaya reported that Kaash had established Kapadia as a performing artiste.

In Zakhmi Aurat (1988), Kapadia played Kiran Dutt, a police officer who is subjected to gang rape and, when the judicial system fails to convict the criminals, unites with other rape survivors to castrate the rapists in revenge. Among the first of a new trend of women-centred revenge films, the film was a financial success but polarised critics and attracted wide coverage for its lengthy, brutal rape scene involving Kapadia. Khalid Mohamed of The Times of India noted Kapadia's "power packed performance" but criticised the rape sequence as "utter lasciviousness" and "vulgarity spattering through the screen". Feminist magazine Manushi panned the film's low cinematic quality, including the absurdity of the action scenes and the "ugly kind of titillation" in the rape scene, but said Kapadia brought "a conviction to her role that is rare among Bombay heroines" with a performance that is "low key, moving and charming without being at all clinging or seductive". The same year, Kapadia worked with Rajkumar Kohli on the action drama Saazish and the horror film Bees Saal Baad, a remake of the 1962 film of the same name. She was the action star in Mera Shikar, a revenge saga directed by Keshu Ramsay, playing Bijli, a once joyous young woman who trains in martial arts to punish a notorious gangster for the crimes inflicted upon her sister. The film was described as an "extraordinarily adroit entertainer" by Subhash K. Jha, who preferred it over the "sleazy sensationalism" of Zakhmi Aurat and noted the "unusual restraint" with which Bijli's transformation was achieved.

In 1989, Kapadia appeared as Jackie Shroff's love interest in Ram Lakhan, a crime drama directed by Subhash Ghai. The film was a success with both critics and audiences, becoming the second-highest grossing Hindi film of the year and earning eight nominations at the 35th Filmfare Awards. She played a courtesan-turned-vengeful mistress in Pati Parmeshwar. The film was released after a well-publicised two-year court battle with the Central Board of Film Certification (CBFC), which initially banned it from screening for its perceived glorification of submissiveness of women through the character of the forgiving wife who is in "ignoble servility" to her husband. Other films starring Kapadia that year include Babbar Subhash's Pyar Ke Naam Qurbaan and J. P. Dutta's action picture Batwara.

=== Professional expansion and critical acclaim (1990–1994) ===
In the 1990s, Kapadia started appearing in parallel cinema, a movement of Indian neo-realist art films, later citing an "inner yearning to exhibit my best potential". Those films include Drishti (1990), Lekin... (1991), Rudaali (1993) and Antareen (1993). Drishti, a marital drama that was directed by Govind Nihalani and inspired by Ingmar Bergman's Scenes from a Marriage (1973), starred Kapadia and Shekhar Kapur as a married couple from Mumbai's intellectual milieu, and followed their trials and tribulations, extramarital affairs, divorce, and eventual reconciliation. Kapadia received critical acclaim for playing the protagonist, career-woman Sandhya, and later recounted her full emotional involvement in the part. The author Subramani recognised Kapadia as "an actress with hidden resources" and appreciated her "intelligent portrayal", through which Sandhya emerged as "vulnerable and intense and full of feminine wiles". A review in The Indian Express noted Kapadia's sensitive performance, presuming her own journey through separation might have enhanced her understanding of the part. The film was acknowledged as the Best Hindi Film of that year at the 38th National Film Awards, and Frontline magazine suggested that Kapadia should have earned the Best Actress award at the same function. She was named Best Actress (Hindi) of the year by the Bengal Film Journalists' Association, and won a jury award for Outstanding Performance at the 37th Filmfare Awards.

Gulzar's romantic mystery Lekin..., which is based on Rabindranath Tagore's short story "The Hungry Stones" (1895), features Kapadia as Reva, a restless spirit who haunts an ancient Rajasthani palace seeking liberation. The film traces Reva's intermittent apparitions in front of Sameer (Vinod Khanna), a museum curator who arrives at the palace and—upon watching her visual recreation of events from her tragic story—resolves to set her free. Kapadia was determined to get the part as soon as she learned about the project and kept persistently calling Gulzar and the film's producer Lata Mangeshkar until she was finally cast. To make her character more truthful, Gulzar forbade Kapadia to blink during filming, trying to capture an "endless, fixed gaze" that would give her "a feeling of being surreal". Kapadia has often cited this role as a personal favourite and the pinnacle of her career, and wished it had been given more screen time in the film. Lekin... was popular with critics and Kapadia's performance in it earned her a third Filmfare nomination. Subhash K. Jha described Reva as "the essence of evanescence" and took note of the "intense tragedy" with which Kapadia played the part.

Kapadia played a young widow in the military drama Prahaar (1991), starring and directed by Nana Patekar, with whom she would collaborate on several future projects. Kapadia and co-star Madhuri Dixit agreed to act without wearing makeup upon Patekar's insistence. The film impressed critics, who credited both actresses for their work, although most of the praise went to Patekar. Further critical attention came Kapadia's way when she played a principled office receptionist opposite Sunny Deol in the action film Narsimha. In Haque (1991), a political drama directed by Harish Bhosle and scripted by Mahesh Bhatt, she played Varsha B. Singh, an Orthodox Hindu woman who, after years of subservience, acts in defiance of her oppressive husband. The author Ram Awatar Agnihotri noted Kapadia for a brave and convincing portrayal. Kapadia starred alongside Amitabh Bachchan in the fantasy Ajooba, a big-budgeted Indo-Russian co-production that was co-directed by Shashi Kapoor and Gennady Vasilyev. Based on Arabian mythology and set in the fictional Afghan kingdom Baharistan, the film saw her in the role of Rukhsana, a young woman who arrives from India to rescue her father from prison. The critical response to Ajooba was mediocre, and it failed to attract viewers in Indian cinemas against success in the Soviet Union.

The release of Maarg, her second project under Mahesh Bhatt's direction, was delayed for several years before its straight-to-video release in late 1992. The film is about power politics within an ashram and features Kapadia as Uma, who works as a prostitute by choice. The critic Iqbal Masood considered it "a powerful satire" with "excellent performances". According to Bhatt, Kapadia's role was so intense it left her close to a breakdown after filming ended. She next played Barkha, a single woman who abandons her newly born, out-of-wedlock daughter, in Hema Malini's directorial debut Dil Aashna Hai (1992). In Shashilal K. Nair's crime drama Angaar (1992), Kapadia played Mili, a homeless orphan who is collected by an unemployed man (Jackie Shroff). Angaar, and Kapadia's performance in it, received positive reviews from critics but it was financially unsuccessful. Meena Iyer of The Times of India, who called it "one of the most engaging mafia films to have come out of Bollywood", attributed the film's limited audience to its subject matter.

"The standard Indian commercial film gives an actor hardly a chance to act because it seeks to create a cardboard cut-out seen from a distance as in the open air rural stage; the gesture must be broad in order to be seen, the speech must be loud in order to be heard. Psychology of character cannot, must not, be created; to seem too real is to risk confusing, even alienating, the audience. Kapadia has enough experience of this convention to be able to use some of its elements and enough understanding of acting techniques to create a real person. She is thus able to make her Shanichari both larger than life and believable."

— Chidananda Dasgupta from Cinemaya on Kapadia's performance in Rudaali (1993)

In 1993, Kapadia won the National Film Award for Best Actress for her performance in Rudaali, a drama that was directed by Kalpana Lajmi and adapted from Mahasweta Devi's short story of the same name. She played the central character Shanichari, a lonely, hardened Rajasthani village woman who, during a lifetime of misfortune, has never cried and is challenged with a new job as a professional mourner. The citation for the award described her performance as a "compelling interpretation of the tribulations of a lonely woman ravaged by a cruel society". The Indologist Philip Lutgendorf argued that Kapadia's "dignity and conviction, as well as her effective body language and gestures, lift her character far beyond bathos". Among other accolades, she won the Filmfare Critics Award for Best Performance and was acknowledged with Best Actress honours at the Asia-Pacific Film Festival and the International Film Festival in Damascus. Critics and moviegoers accepted Rudaali with enthusiasm, and it was India's submission to the 66th Academy Awards for Best Foreign Language Film. In 2010, Filmfare magazine included Kapadia's work in the film in their list of "80 Iconic Performances".

Another Filmfare nomination for Kapadia came that year for her supporting role as Shanti, a street prostitute whose husband and child were burnt alive, in the Priyadarshan-directed crime drama Gardish. An adaptation of the 1989 Malayalam film Kireedam, the film starred Jackie Shroff and Amrish Puri and was met with approval from critics and the public. The Indian Express praised the film's "script, vivid characters and powerful dialogues", and noted Kapadia's ability to command audience attention. Mrinal Sen's 1993 Bengali drama Antareen, which was adapted from Saadat Hasan Manto's short story "Badshahat Ka Khatama" (1950), was Kapadia's first non-Hindi project since Vikram (1986). She played an unhappily married woman who develops a telephonic relationship with a stranger (Anjan Dutt). Kapadia insisted on playing the role spontaneously and thus refused to enrol in a crash course in Bengali, believing she would manage to speak it convincingly. Her voice was later dubbed by Anushua Chatterjee, a decision with which Kapadia was unhappy. Antareen was well-received and was named the Best Bengali Film at the 41st National Film Awards but Kapadia was dissatisfied with the outcome and dismissed it as a poor film.

In 1994, in Mehul Kumar's Krantiveer, Kapadia portrayed the journalist Meghna Dixit, a rape victim who persuades an alcoholic, unemployed village man (Nana Patekar) to be a champion of justice for those around him. The film was a box-office success and became India's third-highest-grossing picture of the year. The Indian Express complimented Kapadia for having developed into a leading character actor with this film. For her performance, Kapadia received her fourth Filmfare Award, this time in the Best Supporting Actress category. A controversy arose in December 1993 when Kapadia walked out of Raj Kanwar's Kartavya, in which she played Divya Bharti's mother in-law. Following Bharti's death in April 1993, almost midway through the shooting, she was replaced by Juhi Chawla. Concerned that it would damage her career, Kapadia refused to play a mother in-law to Chawla, who is a decade her junior. The Film Makers' Combine circulated a ban against Kapadia from signing any new projects; the ban was withdrawn in May 1994 when the Cine Artistes' Association intervened in support of Kapadia.

=== Hiatus, setback and resurgence (1995–2008) ===
After Antareen, Kapadia was expected to work in more independent films but she took a three-year hiatus from acting, later saying she was "emotionally exhausted". She returned to commercial cinema in 1997, playing Amitabh Bachchan's wife in Mrityudaata under Mehul Kumar's direction. The film was a critical and commercial failure; India Today panned its "comic book-level storytelling". The trade journal Film Information said Kapadia had a role unworthy of her time, and Kapadia shared similar sentiments. She next acted opposite Jackie Shroff in the murder mystery 2001: Do Hazaar Ek (1998) and the romantic drama Laawaris (1999), which were rejected by audiences. Laawaris was criticised for its formulaic script and lack of originality and, according to Hindustan Times, did not allow Kapadia "much to do except scream". In her final feature of the decade, Hum Tum Pe Marte Hain (1999), Kapadia played Devyani Chopra, the strict matriarch of a wealthy family. Subhash K. Jha called the film an embarrassment while Suparn Verma gave a scathing review of Kapadia's performance, noting she "wears a permanent scowl" throughout the film.

In her first film of the new millennium, Kapadia co-starred in Farhan Akhtar's directorial debut Dil Chahta Hai (2001), which depicts the contemporary, routine life of Indian affluent youth, and focuses on a period of transition in the lives of three friends (Aamir Khan, Saif Ali Khan and Akshaye Khanna). Kapadia played the role of Tara Jaiswal, a middle-aged alcoholic woman, an interior designer by profession, and a divorcee who is not allowed to meet her daughter. The film presents her story through the character of Siddharth (Khanna), a much-younger man whom she befriends and who falls deeply in love with her. Akhtar wrote the part specifically for Kapadia, who later called it "a role to die for". Critics lauded Dil Chahta Hai as a groundbreaking film for its realistic portrayal of India's modern society, and it won the Best Hindi Film award at the 49th National Film Awards. Commercially, it performed well in large cities but failed in the rural areas, which trade analysts attributed to the urban lifestyle depicted in it. Saibal Chatterjee, in a review for Hindustan Times, noted, "Dimple Kapadia, in a brief, somewhat underdeveloped role, presents a poignant study of loneliness".

In 2002, Kapadia portrayed the title role in the drama Leela, an American production that was directed by Somnath Sen and co-stars Deepti Naval, Vinod Khanna and Amol Mhatre. Kapadia's part, which was written specially for her, is that of a forty-year-old, married Mumbai University professor who, after the death of her mother, loses her sense of happiness and takes a job as a visiting professor of South Asian studies in California. The story follows Leela's acclimation to her new surroundings and her relationship with a young Indian-American man named Kris (Mhatre), one of her students. Kapadia was nervous during the making of the film but believed the tension helped elevate her acting. The film was reviewed favourably by American critics, among whom Maitland McDonagh from TV Guide wrote: "Dimple Kapadia shines in this family melodrama ... [her] intelligent, nuanced performance is the film's highlight". Reviews in India were similarly approving of Leela and Kapadia's work.

Kapadia played the lead role of army wife Sandra Williams, whose palatial household becomes plagued by eerie occurrences, in Hum Kaun Hai? (2004), a supernatural thriller. The film opened to a mixed critical reception, but critics agreed Kapadia's performance and charismatic presence enhance an otherwise weak script. A year later, Kapadia and Rishi Kapoor reunited as a lead couple for the third time after Bobby and Saagar in Pyaar Mein Twist, starring as middle-aged single parents who fall in love and are subsequently confronted with the reaction of their children. The film generated mostly negative reviews but critics concurred the chemistry between the lead pair was enough of a reason to watch it, acknowledging the nostalgic value of the pairing. Few people went to see the film; within two weeks it was declared a failure. In 2016, scholar Afreen Khan cited Kapadia's character as a departure from the conventional portrayal of mothers in Hindi films, believing her role to be a modern mother whom daughters dream of having.

In 2006, Kapadia co-starred with Saif Ali Khan and Naseeruddin Shah in the black comedy Being Cyrus, an English-language independent feature and the directorial debut of Homi Adajania, who would often cast her in his future endeavours. Kapadia played Katy Sethna, Shah's neurotic and unfaithful wife who has an affair with Cyrus (Khan), a young drifter who enters their house as an assistant. The film was well received at a number of film festivals before its theatrical release in India, upon which it was embraced by critics and audiences, making a considerable profit against its small budget. The BBC's Poonam Joshi stated, "the descent into despair of Dimple Kapadia's Katy is enthralling" but other critics, including Derek Elley from Variety and Shradha Sukumaran from Mid-Day, criticised her for excessively overacting. In the mystical love story Banaras (2006), Kapadia played a wealthy Brahmin woman whose daughter falls in love with a man of a lower caste.

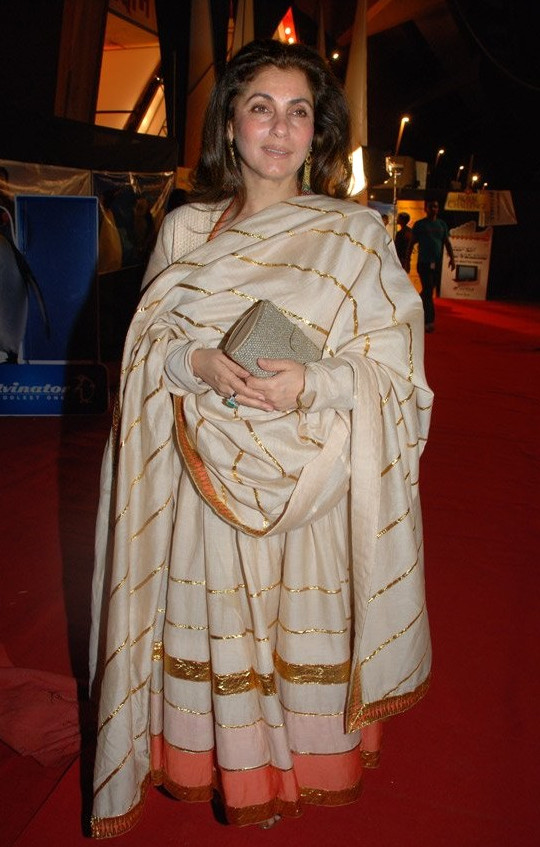
Kapadia at the Sansui Television Awards in 2008

V. K. Prakash's romance Phir Kabhi (2008) stars Kapadia and Mithun Chakraborty as ageing people who meet at a school reunion and rekindle their high-school romance. The film was awarded seven prizes, including the Best Film Award in the Narrative Feature section, at the Los Angeles Reel Film Festival. It was released direct-to-video a year later and was simultaneously distributed via pay-per-view direct-to-home (DTH) services, becoming the first Hindi film to premier on streaming media platforms. At the request of her son-in-law Akshay Kumar, Kapadia voiced the character Devi, the mother of the elephant Jumbo (Kumar), in the animated feature Jumbo (2008), a remake of the 2006 Thai computer animation Khan Kluay.

=== Recognition for character roles (2009–2014) ===
Kapadia was cast in Zoya Akhtar's first directorial venture Luck by Chance (2009), a satirical take on the Hindi film industry. She played Neena Walia, an erstwhile superstar—referred to in the film as "a crocodile in a chiffon saree"—who struggles to launch her young daughter into the movie business. Kapadia was approached for the part because it required an actress who had been a mainstream star in the past. Akhtar noted Kapadia's edgy portrayal of the character's fickle nature, saying Kapadia is "all warm, soft sunshine and then there's a flip and she's hard, cold, steely". Luck By Chance opened to a warm critical response, though its financial income was modest. Critics were appreciative of Kapadia's performance, which earned her a Best Supporting Actress nomination at Filmfare. Deepa Karmalkar from Screen characterised her role as "gloriously bitchy" while Avijit Ghosh of The Times of India believed Kapadia had delivered "one of her most nuanced performances" in a character he found to be "a rare kind of Hindi film mother" who is "hawk-eyed, tough as nails but vainglorious, and in a strange way, vulnerable as well".

In 2010, Kapadia played the small part of Salman Khan's asthmatic mother in action comedy Dabangg, which was the most popular film of the year in India and the second-highest grossing Hindi film of all-time up to that point. Reviews for Kapadia's role were varied; Blessy Chettiar of Daily News and Analysis likened her character to "the mothers in Hindi cinema of yore, self-sacrificing, torn between relationships, slightly over-the-top, likeable nevertheless". Next followed Tum Milo Toh Sahi (2010), a romantic comedy which stars Kapadia as Delshad Nanji, a Parsi woman in charge of an Irani café whose business is under threat from developers and who falls in love with the lawyer (Nana Patekar) who represents her in court. Kapadia adopted a Parsi accent for the role and while preparing for it, visited several Irani cafés in Mumbai to adapt to the character's cultural milieu. The film opened to average reviews but Kapadia's performance received generally positive feedback. According to Anupama Chopra, the character of Delshad "veers into caricature" but Kapadia "plays her with affection and energy and at least has some fun doing it". In her only film of 2011, Kapadia was cast as Rishi Kapoor's wife and her son in-law Akshay Kumar's mother in Nikhil Advani's Patiala House, a sports film revolving around cricket.

Kapadia collaborated again with Homi Adajania in Cocktail (2012) and Finding Fanny (2014), both critical and commercial successes. Cocktail, a romantic comedy, saw her play Saif Ali Khan's loud Punjabi mother, Kavita Kapoor, an appearance to which Aniruddha Guha of Daily News and Analysis referred as a "veritable treat". While filming Cocktail, Adajania shared the script of the satirical road movie Finding Fanny with Kapadia. Believing he is a director capable of bringing the best in her, she expressed keen interest in the project. She was cast as Rosalina "Rosie" Eucharistica, a conceited-but-well-meaning woman who joins her late son's widow (Deepika Padukone) on a road trip across Goa. Kapadia was required to wear a heavy prosthetic posterior for the role, and her portrayal earned her a fourth Best Supporting Actress nomination at Filmfare. Rachel Saltz of The New York Times wrote Kapadia "inhabits and enhances her role" and "steers clear of caricature and even milks some humor out of the unfunny script".

In 2013, Kapadia was the protagonist in the comedy What the Fish, portraying Sudha Mishra, an irate Delhi-based divorcee who begrudgingly entrusts her niece with taking care of her house while she is away. Kapadia was enthusiastic about the part, feeling challenged to play its different traits. Reviews of both the film and Kapadia's work were mixed. The Times of India panned the film's script for making "Kapadia's tryst with comedy seem loud and forced", and Raja Sen deemed her part the most forgettable of her career. Sarita A. Tanwar of Daily News and Analysis considered the film "a rather audacious entertaining attempt" and said Kapadia was "in top form", and similarly positive comments were written by Subhash K. Jha.

=== Limited work, Tenet and beyond (2015–present) ===
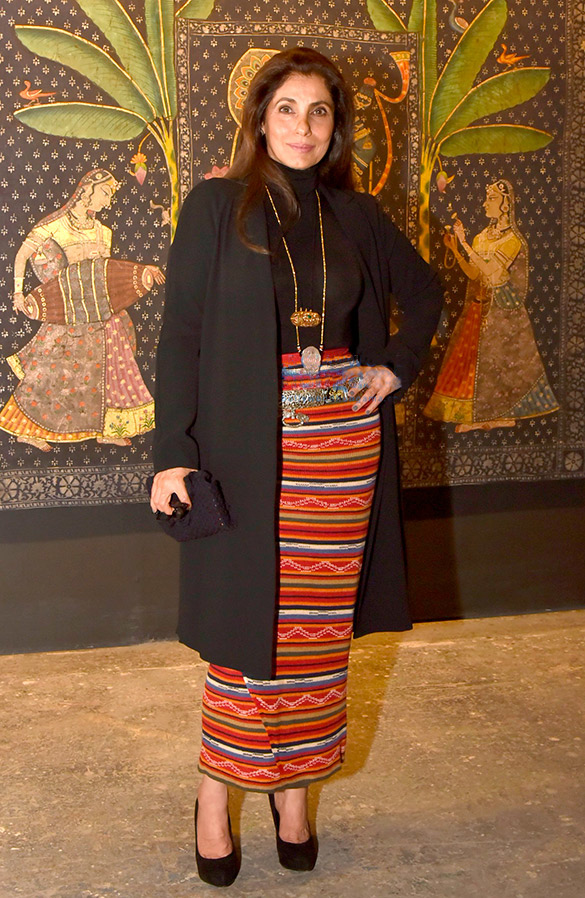
Kapadia in 2018

Over the rest of the decade, Kapadia returned to film twice for minor roles in the action comedies Welcome Back (2015) and Dabangg 3 (2019). She played a conwoman in Anees Bazmee's Welcome Back along with an ensemble cast led by Anil Kapoor and Nana Patekar. Dabangg 3, the third instalment of the Dabangg film series, saw her briefly reprise the role of Naina Devi. In her first film of the 2020s, Kapadia appeared alongside Irrfan Khan and Kareena Kapoor in the comedy-drama Angrezi Medium (2020), her fourth project under Homi Adajania's direction. A spiritual sequel to the 2017 film Hindi Medium, it was theatrically released in India on 13 March amid the COVID-19 pandemic, which affected its commercial performance due to the closing of cinemas. Initial plans for a re-release were cancelled and the film was made available digitally less than a month later. Kapadia played a strict store owner estranged from her daughter (Kapoor), a role Vinayak Chakravorty of Outlook thought was "used to highlight loneliness among the aged" but believed could have been stronger.

Kapadia next played arms dealer Priya Singh in Christopher Nolan's spy thriller Tenet. Her screen test for the role was shot in 2019 by Adajania before filming for Angrezi Medium began, followed by an audition for Nolan in Mumbai. Impressed with her charisma and poise, Nolan cast Kapadia in the part, believing she thoroughly embodied his vision of the character. The film opened amid the pandemic to a worldwide audience and, having grossed $364 million worldwide, became the fifth-highest-grossing film of 2020. Critics reacted positively to her performance; Richard Roeper of Chicago Sun-Times wrote Kapadia "quietly steals every scene she's in" and Guy Lodge of Variety said she had given the film's "wiliest performance". Having admitted to being a reluctant actor for years, Kapadia credited Tenet with restoring her passion for film acting.

Ali Abbas Zafar's 2021 Amazon Prime political streaming series Tandav starred Kapadia in her first appearance on a digital platform as Anuradha Kishore, a power-hungry politician who seeks to undermine the new political rival (Saif Ali Khan) of the Prime Minister of India, her longtime ally. The show opened amid massive protests and police complaints against its makers for allegedly insulting Hindu deities and hurting the religious sentiments of Hindus, following which Zafar cut several scenes and issued a formal apology. Reviewers responded variably to Tandav, but Kapadia's efforts were better received. A Thursday (2022), Behzad Khambata's vigilante-hostage thriller starring Yami Gautam, featured Kapadia in the fictional part of Prime Minister of India Maya Rajguru.

Kapadia had a cameo in Ayan Mukerji's action fantasy Brahmāstra: Part One – Shiva (2022) and starred in Siddharth Anand's action thriller Pathaan (2023), led by Shah Rukh Khan. In Pathaan, based in the YRF Spy Universe, she played Nandini, a senior officer in charge of a unit of Research and Analysis Wing (RAW) agents. Her performance was particularly picked up for praise. Sneha Bengani of CNBC TV18 was appreciative of her "sharp and graceful, commanding, yet restrained" performance. The film broke several box-office records to become the second-highest-grossing Indian film of 2023 and the third-highest-grossing Hindi film of all time. Kapadia won a Zee Cine Award for Best Actor in a Supporting Role – Female for her performance.

A supporting role as the mother of Ranbir Kapoor's character in Luv Ranjan's romantic comedy Tu Jhoothi Main Makkaar (2023) brought Kapadia positive notice. Despite mixed reviews, the film enjoyed a strong run at the box office. Kapadia next reunited with Adajania for the Disney+ Hotstar crime thriller series Saas, Bahu Aur Flamingo, in which she played the protagonist Savitri, the powerful matriarch of a drug cartel selling a cocaine variant called flamingo. For the part, Kapadia was required to learn the local dialect to the fictional town of Runjh, located in northwest India. The show was well received and Kapadia earned rave reviews for her central performance. Shubhra Gupta, writing for The Indian Express, said Kapadia is "effortlessly in command of the room, and the situation". For her work, Kapadia received a Filmfare OTT Award for Best Actress in a Drama Series.

In 2024, Kapadia played a scientist in the romantic comedy Teri Baaton Mein Aisa Uljha Jiya, starring Shahid Kapoor and Kriti Sanon, and featured alongside an ensemble cast in Adajania's mystery film Murder Mubarak. Later that year, she played the title role in the romantic drama Go Noni Go, portraying a widowed middle-aged woman who develops a relationship with her younger yoga instructor, played by Manav Kaul, much to the dismay of those around her. Based on the short story "Salaam Noni Appa" by Kapadia's daughter Twinkle and directed by Sonal Dabral in his directorial debut, the film premiered at the MAMI Film Festival. Next followed Saurabh Shukla's romantic comedy Jab Khuli Kitaab (2026), which starred Kapadia and Pankaj Kapur as an older couple who seek divorce after 50 years of marriage. Kapadia played Anusuya Nautiyal, who awakens from a prolonged coma and confesses to her devoted husband that she had an extramarital affair decades earlier. The film premiered on the streaming service ZEE5 to positive reviews. Deepa Gahlot highlighted Kapur and Kapadia's lead performances, and Devesh Sharma from Filmfare described Kapadia as "luminous", noting the "regret, resilience and quiet strength" with which she imbues her character.

== Public image and artistry ==
When Kapadia returned to films after her separation from Khanna, she faced constant comparison to her Bobby days and struggled to be taken seriously as an actor. According to Jyotika Virdi, the author of the book The Cinematic Imagination, while Kapadia's trajectory is different from those of other female Hindi film stars, she turned her disadvantages to her advantage. Virdi said Kapadia's forthright manner made a major contribution to her career: "Speaking candidly to the press, she and the reporters plotted her life's narrative from the innocent teenager snared into an impossible marriage to the emergence of a mature 'woman with experience'." Kapadia is known for her assertive and moody nature; during the making of Janbaaz (1986), the director Feroz Khan said he had never met a woman with her levels of "pent-up aggression". On the other hand, Mahesh Bhatt, the director of Kaash (1987), said generosity is her defining trait. The journalist Bhawana Somaaya, who conducted a series of interviews with Kapadia during the 1980s, stated: "She's a strange bundle of contradictions. Her moods change in a jiffy." According to some critics, this approach has sometimes been at the cost of professional opportunities as "her unpredictable nature and moods have distanced many well wishers". In reply to this, she said: "I am moody by nature. But I have never consciously hurt anyone."

Virdi wrote Kapadia fought her way to success by committing to serious and challenging work and described her parts in Aitbaar (1985), Kaash (1987) and Drishti (1990) as characters with which she "drew from the well of her own experience". With Zakhmi Aurat (1988), Kapadia became one of the mainstream actresses associated with a new wave of women-centred revenge films. As an action heroine, she chose to perform her own stunts, which the critic M. Rahman thought made her performance more convincing. Although she enjoyed working in similar projects, such as Mera Shikar (1988) and Kali Ganga (1990), she bemoaned about being paid less than male action stars. The author Dinesh Raheja believed Kapadia's involvement in art films in the 1990s happened at a time when she was no longer willing to play the "pretty prop in hero-oriented films", arguing her new choices "honed Dimple's talent for lending fine striations to complex emotions". Mahesh Bhatt commended her for not turning into "a victim of her own success" by refusing to appear in films of strictly commercial value. According to Govind Nihalani, the director of Drishti (1990), Kapadia has a genuine interest in serious work that would challenge her talent and realise her potential. Similar sentiments were shared by Shashi Kapoor, who said Kapadia had always been eager to act in quality films. Kapadia said her involvement in independent films was a conscious decision to experiment in different cinema and prove her abilities.

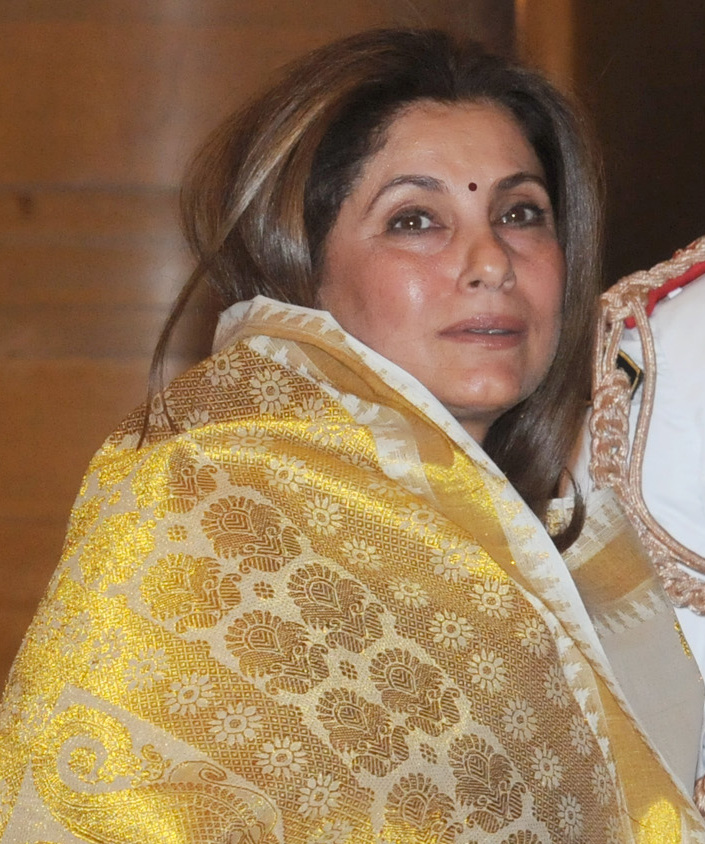
Kapadia in 2013

When questioned about her hiatus after Rudaali at her career peak, Kapadia said she needed space and that generally her "career has always been secondary" to her. Her infrequent work since then, which manifested in numerous gaps between her screen appearances, has gained her a reputation for being selective about her work. Admitting her limited professional drive, she attributed it to the lack of worthy offers and the "huge effort" expended in film acting, which consumes time otherwise spent on her family and private life. Even so, Kapadia's later work was noted by film scholars, including Shoma Chatterji and Afreen Khan, who listed her among the female actors who represent a changing portrayal of mothers in Hindi films, with roles of women who consider their happiness to be of equal importance to that of their children. Similar thoughts were expressed by Mumbai Mirror's Trisha Gupta, who was impressed with Kapadia's diverse repertoire of maternal roles, ranging from Luck by Chance (2009) and Dabangg (2010) to Finding Fanny (2014). Guided by her own judgement, Kapadia normally commits to a project without seeking advice and often willingly works with young or first-time directors, finding their enthusiasm and creativity beneficial to both the film and her performance.

Kapadia's screen image has been characterised in terms of her perceived beauty and sex appeal. The Times of India wrote in reference to her role in Saagar, "Dimple was a vision of lush beauty; quite the forbidden fruit, rising from the ocean like Aphrodite emerging from the waves and surf". Speaking of her post-comeback screen persona, the critic Khalid Mohamed observed, "Her arsenal comprised, among other elements, expressive cognac eyes, a nuanced, resonating voice skilled in Hindustani dialogue delivery, easy body language, and that seductive toss of her auburn hair." Mrinal Sen, who directed her in Antareen (1993), compared Kapadia to Sophia Loren and described her face as "a landscape of desolation". Anil Kapoor, her co-star of Janbaaz, hailed Kapadia as the most beautiful Indian actress since Madhubala. According to Dinesh Raheja, Kapadia's casting in Dil Chahta Hai (2001) and Leela (2002), in which she played middle-aged women who are the object of younger men's desire, served as "a kind of tribute to her eternal beauty". Emma Thomas, the producer of Tenet (2020), distinguished Kapadia as having "incredible magnetism, charisma, and glamour", which made her the right choice for the film.

Critics have been appreciative of Kapadia's acting prowess and some have analysed it in relation to her appearance. Ranjan Das Gupta called her "an instinctive actress, spontaneous and intelligent" who is best at playing "intense characters", and said her beauty is "her asset as well as limitation". In 1988, Subhash K. Jha wrote that "besides her elastic and primeval looks", Kapadia "possesses an inbuilt instinct for grasping characters at a level way beyond the surface". While working with her on Kaash, Mahesh Bhatt said Kapadia had been through so much in her private life she need not study method acting to play real women. Academic writers Madhu Kishwar and Ruth Vanita of the feminist magazine Manushi noted Kapadia for being unafraid to look less attractive for the benefit of convincingly expressing anguish and emotion. M.L. Dhawan from The Tribune commented, "All those who have been following Dimple Kapadia's career from Bobby, Lekin and Rudaali will assert that she is more talented than glamorous". Kapadia has described herself as a "spontaneous actor who is guided by instinct" and on another occasion, "a competent actress yet to deliver her best".

== Awards and nominations ==
Table containing awards and nominations received by Dimple Kapadia
Year	Award	Category	Film	Result	Ref.
1973	21st Filmfare Awards	Best Actress	Bobby	Won	
1985	33rd Filmfare Awards	Best Actress	Saagar	Won	
1991	Priyadarshini Academy Awards	Smita Patil Memorial Award for Best Actress	—	Won	
1991	37th Filmfare Awards	Best Actress	Lekin...	Nominated	
1991	37th Filmfare Awards	Outstanding Performance	Drishti	Won	
1992	55th Bengal Film Journalists' Association Awards	Best Actress (Hindi)	Drishti	Won	
1992	38th Filmfare Awards	Best Performance – Critics	Rudaali	Won	
1993	39th Filmfare Awards	Best Actress	Rudaali	Nominated	
1993	40th National Film Awards	Best Actress	Rudaali	Won	
1993	8th Damascus International Film Festival	Best Actress	Rudaali	Won	
1993	38th Asia-Pacific Film Festival	Best Actress	Rudaali	Won	
1993	39th Filmfare Awards	Best Supporting Actress	Gardish	Nominated	
1994	40th Filmfare Awards	Best Supporting Actress	Krantiveer	Won	
2001	5th Zee Cine Awards	Best Actor in a Supporting Role – Female	Dil Chahta Hai	Nominated	
2009	55th Filmfare Awards	Best Supporting Actress	Luck by Chance	Nominated	
2009	5th Producers Guild Film Awards	Best Supporting Actress	Luck by Chance	Nominated	
2009	2010 Stardust Awards	Best Supporting Actress	Luck by Chance	Nominated	
2010	12th IIFA Awards	Best Supporting Actress	Dabangg	Nominated	
2010	2011 Stardust Awards	Best Supporting Actress	Dabangg	Nominated	
2014	60th Filmfare Awards	Best Supporting Actress	Finding Fanny	Nominated	
2014	10th Producers Guild Film Awards	Best Actress in a Supporting Role	Finding Fanny	Nominated	
2014	10th Producers Guild Film Awards	Best Actor in a Comic Role	Finding Fanny	Nominated	
2015	21st Screen Awards	Best Supporting Actress	Finding Fanny	Nominated	
2014	2014 Stardust Awards	Best Actress	Finding Fanny	Nominated	
2023	2023 Filmfare OTT Awards	Best Actress in a Drama Series	Saas, Bahu Aur Flamingo	Nominated	
2023	22nd Zee Cine Awards	Best Actor in a Supporting Role – Female	Pathaan	Won	
2024	2024 Filmfare OTT Awards	Best Supporting Actress in a Web Original Film	Murder Mubarak	Nominated	

== Bibliography ==
- Abbas, K. A. (2013). Kohli, Suresh (ed.). Bobby: The Complete Story. Harper Collins. ISBN 978-93-5029-554-0.
- Adarkar, Vivek (2003). Tomassini, Christine; Schwartz, Carol (eds.). Magill's Cinema Annual. Gale Research International, Limited. ISBN 978-1-55862-459-7.
- Agnihotri, Ram Awatar (1992). Artistes and Their Films of Modern Hindi Cinema: Cultural and Socio-Political Impact on Society, 1931–91. Commonwealth Publishers. ISBN 978-81-7169-180-7. Archived from the original on 14 June 2013.
- Arunachalam, Param (2020). BollySwar: 1981–1990. Mavrix Infotech Private Limited. ISBN 978-81-938482-2-7. Archived from the original on 20 April 2021.
- Ausaja, S. M. M. (2009). Bollywood in Posters. Om Books International. p. 1993. ISBN 978-81-87108-55-9. Archived from the original on 20 April 2021.
- Begum-Hossain, Momtaz (2007). Bollywood Crafts: 20 Projects Inspired by Popular Indian Cinema. GMC Distribution. ISBN 978-1-86108-418-7.
- Bose, Nandana (2017). "Globalization, Reflexivity and Genre in Zoya Akhtar's Films". In Viswamohan, Aysha Iqbal; John, Vimal Mohan (eds.). Behind the Scenes: Contemporary Bollywood Directors and Their Cinema. Sage Publications India. pp. 215–226. ISBN 978-93-86062-40-6. Archived from the original on 20 April 2021.
- Bramesco, Charles (14 March 2023). Colors of Film: The Story of Cinema in 50 Palettes. Frances Lincoln. ISBN 978-0-7112-7938-4.
- Bumiller, Elisabeth (1991). May You Be the Mother of a Hundred Sons. Penguin Books India. ISBN 978-0-14-015671-3.
- Chatterji, Shoma A. (31 January 2020). Bollywood Cinema Kaleidoscope. Doshor Publication. ISBN 978-81-944429-1-2. Archived from the original on 17 April 2023.
- Chaudhuri, Diptakirti (2014). Bollybook: The Big Book of Hindi Movie Trivia. Penguin UK. ISBN 978-93-5118-799-8. Archived from the original on 20 April 2021.
- Chopra, Anupama (2014a). Freeze Frame. Om Books International. ISBN 978-93-81607-11-4. Archived from the original on 20 April 2021.
- Chopra, Shaili (2014b). When I Was 25: The Leaders Look Back. Random House India. ISBN 978-81-8400-677-3. Archived from the original on 20 April 2021.
- Da Cunha, Uma (1995). Cowie, Peter (ed.). Variety International Film Guide 1995. Hamlyn. ISBN 978-0-600-58516-9.
- Dasgupta, Rohit K.; Datta, Sangeeta (2018). 100 Essential Indian Films. Rowman & Littlefield. ISBN 978-1-4422-7799-1. Archived from the original on 17 April 2023.
- Dé, Shobha (1998). Selective Memory: Stories from My Life. Penguin Books. pp. 174–175. ISBN 978-0-14-027784-5. Archived from the original on 20 April 2021.
- Derné, Steve (2000). Movies, Masculinity, and Modernity: An Ethnography of Men's Filmgoing in India. Greenwood Press. ISBN 978-0-313-31287-8. Archived from the original on 20 October 2020.
- Dutta, Anmol (15 October 2022). "Content Carnival? (Re)Viewing Representation, Indianness, and OTT Culture in India". In Samuel, Michael; Mitchell, Louisa (eds.). Streaming and Screen Culture in Asia-Pacific. Springer Nature. pp. 145–160. ISBN 978-3-031-09374-6.
- Dwyer, Rachel (2005). 100 Bollywood Films. Lotus Collection, Roli Books. ISBN 978-81-7436-433-3.
- Dwyer, Rachel (2000). All You Want is Money, All You Need is Love: Sexuality and Romance in Modern India. Cassell. ISBN 978-0-304-70320-3. Archived from the original on 20 October 2020.
- Gahlot, Deepa (2015). Sheroes: 25 Daring Women of Bollywood. Westland Limited. pp. 69–73. ISBN 978-93-85152-74-0. Archived from the original on 20 April 2021.
- Ganti, Tejaswini (2004). Bollywood: A Guidebook to Popular Hindi Cinema. Psychology Press. ISBN 978-0-415-28854-5. Archived from the original on 20 April 2021.
- Ganti, Tejaswini (2012). Producing Bollywood: Inside the Contemporary Hindi Film Industry. Duke University Press. ISBN 978-0-8223-5213-6. Archived from the original on 20 October 2020.
- Ghose, Vijaya (1994). Women in Society: India. New York: M. Cavendish. ISBN 978-1-85435-564-5.
- Gulzar; Nihalani, Govind; Chatterjee, Saibal (2003). Encyclopaedia of Hindi Cinema. Encyclopaedia Britannica (India). ISBN 978-81-7991-066-5.
- Gulzar, Meghna (2004). Because he is ... Rupa & Co. ISBN 81-291-0364-8. Archived from the original on 20 October 2020.
- Hood, John W. (2000). The Essential Mystery: The Major Filmmakers of Indian Art Cinema. Orient BlackSwan. ISBN 978-81-250-1870-4.
- Husain, Maqbul Fida (2002). Where Art Thou: An Autobiography. M.F. Husain Foundation. p. 77. Archived from the original on 20 April 2021.
- Mottram, James (8 September 2020). The Secrets of Tenet: Inside Christopher Nolan's Quantum Cold War. Simon & Schuster. ISBN 978-1-64722-060-0.
- Joshi, Priya (2015). Bollywood's India: A Public Fantasy. Columbia University Press. ISBN 978-0-231-53907-4. Archived from the original on 20 April 2021.
- Jha, Subhash K. (2005a). The Essential Guide to Bollywood. Lustre Press. ISBN 978-81-7436-378-7.
- Kumar, Arvind (2002). Trends in Modern Journalism. Sarup & Sons. ISBN 978-81-7625-277-5. Archived from the original on 15 June 2013.
- Kumar, K. Naresh (1995). Indian Cinema: Ebbs and Tides. Har-Anand Publications. ISBN 978-81-241-0344-9. Archived from the original on 15 June 2013.
- Mazumdar, Ranjani (2007). Bombay Cinema: An Archive of the City. U of Minnesota Press. pp. 143–144. ISBN 978-1-4529-1302-5. Archived from the original on 16 August 2021.
- Mazumdar, Ranjani (2010). "Friction, Collision and the Grotesque: The Dystopic Fragments of Bombay Cinema". In Prakash, Gyan (ed.). Noir Urbanisms: Dystopic Images of the Modern City. Princeton University Press. pp. 150–186. ISBN 978-1-4008-3662-8. Archived from the original on 16 August 2021.
- Mazumdar, Ranjani (2017). "The Legal Unspeakable: Rape in 1980s Bombay Cinema". In Dutt, Bishnupriya; Reinelt, Janelle; Sahai, Shrinkhla (eds.). Gendered Citizenship: Manifestations and Performance. Springer. pp. 163–179. ISBN 978-3-319-59093-6. Archived from the original on 16 August 2021.
- Mehta, Monika (2012). "An Anomalous Dilemma: To Ban or to Certify the Self-Sacrificial Wife in Pati Parmeshwar". Censorship and Sexuality in Bombay Cinema. University of Texas Press. pp. 131–158. ISBN 978-0-292-74251-2. Archived from the original on 16 August 2021.
- Nash, Jay Robert; Ross, Stanley Ralph (1988). The Motion Picture Guide: 1988 Annual (The Films of 1987). Cinebooks. ISBN 978-0-933997-16-5.
- Singh, Jai Arjun (2014). "Milky Ways: A Contemplation of the Hindi-movie Maa". In Misra, Jaishree (ed.). Of Mothers and Others: Stories, Essays, Poems. Zubaan. pp. 32–53. ISBN 978-93-83074-25-9. Archived from the original on 16 August 2021.
- Mubarki, Meraj Ahmed (2016). Filming Horror: Hindi Cinema, Ghosts and Ideologies. Sage Publications India. ISBN 978-93-5150-873-1. Archived from the original on 12 October 2020.
- Nanda, Ritu (2002). Raj Kapoor Speaks. Penguin Books India. ISBN 978-0-670-04952-3. Archived from the original on 15 October 2020.
- Raj, Ashok (2009). Hero Vol. 2. Hay House, Inc. ISBN 978-93-81398-03-6. Archived from the original on 20 April 2021.
- Raj, Ashok (2014). "The Communal Environment in the 1990s and Beyond". The Hay House Book of Cinema that Heals. Hay House, Inc. ISBN 978-93-84544-14-0. Archived from the original on 20 April 2021.
- Rajadhyaksha, Ashish; Willemen, Paul (1999). Encyclopedia of Indian Cinema. Routledge. ISBN 978-1-135-94325-7.
- Reuben, Bunny (1995). Raj Kapoor, the Fabulous Showman: An Intimate Biography. Indus. ISBN 978-81-7223-196-5. Archived from the original on 7 June 2020.
- Roy, Piyush (2019). Bollywood FAQ: All That's Left to Know About the Greatest Film Story Never Told. Rowman & Littlefield. ISBN 978-1-4930-5083-3. Archived from the original on 20 April 2021.
- Sabharwal, Gopa (2007). India Since 1947: The Independent Years. Penguin Books India. ISBN 978-0-14-310274-8. Archived from the original on 27 June 2014.
- Sen, Meheli (2017). Haunting Bollywood: Gender, Genre, and the Supernatural in Hindi Commercial Cinema. University of Texas Press. ISBN 978-1-4773-1158-5. Archived from the original on 16 August 2021.
- Murali, Sharanya (2017). "Finding Femininity: Homi Adajania and Representations of Urban Womanhood". In Iqbal Viswamohan, Aysha; John, Vimal Mohan (eds.). Behind the Scenes: Contemporary Bollywood Directors and Their Cinema. Sage Publications India. pp. 291–307. ISBN 978-93-86062-40-6. Archived from the original on 16 August 2021.
- Siegel, Bernie; Wing, Diane; Kenley, Holli; Levy, Jay S. (2017). Depmsey, Ernest (ed.). Recovering the Self: A Journal of Hope and Healing (Vol. VI, No. 1) – Grief & Loss. Loving Healing Press. p. 83. ISBN 978-1-61599-340-6. Archived from the original on 15 October 2020.
- Siṃha, Hara Mandira (2000). Hindi filmography: 1981–1999, Volume 2. Satinder Kaur. Archived from the original on 3 January 2014.
- Somaaya, Bhawana (2008). Hema Malini: The Authorized Biography. Roli Books Private Limited. ISBN 978-93-5194-048-7.
- Subramani (1995). Altering Imagination. Fiji Writers' Association. ISBN 978-982-328-001-1. Archived from the original on 16 August 2021.
- Thoraval, Yves (2000). The Cinemas of India. Macmillan India. ISBN 978-0-333-93410-4.
- Trivedi, Vijaya R. (1994). A Chronicle of World Events, January-March 1994. Gyan Publishing House. ISBN 9788121202138.
- Usman, Yasser (2014). Rajesh Khanna: The Untold Story of India's First Superstar. Penguin UK. ISBN 978-93-5118-875-9.
- Vasudev, Aruna (1995). Frames of Mind: Reflections on Indian Cinema. UBSPD. ISBN 978-81-7476-053-1. Archived from the original on 30 April 2013.
- Virdi, Jyotika (2003). The Cinematic ImagiNation [sic]: Indian Popular Films as Social History. Rutgers University Press. pp. 140–143. ISBN 978-0-8135-3191-5.
