= Aitbaar =

1985 film

- Directed by: Mukul Anand
- Written by: Vinay Shukla
- Produced by: Romesh Sharma
- Starring: Raj Babbar; Dimple Kapadia; Suresh Oberoi; Danny Denzongpa
- Cinematography: Pravin Bhatt
- Music by: Bappi Lahiri
- Release date: 22 March 1985
- Country: India
- Language: Hindi

Aitbaar (transl. 'Trust') is a 1985 Indian Hindi-language thriller film directed by Mukul Anand. It stars Raj Babbar, Dimple Kapadia, Suresh Oberoi, Danny Denzongpa, Sharat Saxena in pivotal roles. It was a remake of Alfred Hitchcock's 1954 thriller Dial M For Murder. It was further remade in Tamil in 1985 as Saavi and in Malayalam in 1989 as New Year.

The film's music is by Bappi Lahiri with lyrics by Hasan Kamaal and Farooq Kaiser.

== Plot ==
The film opens with Jaydeep meeting Vikramjeet on a rainy night and inviting him to his house for drinks. During their conversation, Jaydeep recounts how his wife, Neha, is having an affair with Sagar; the story is actually a ruse to convince Vikramjeet to help Jaydeep in exacting revenge on his wife. On receiving refusal, Jaydeep blackmails Vikramjeet with a photo of him disposing off a dead body and his knowledge of various aliases maintained to peddle drugs. Vikramjeet agrees for a sum of INR 1,00,000.

The murder plot is hatched, on a weekend night when Jaydeep and Sagar will be away at a party, Vikramjeet has to enter the house stealthily and wait in the drawing room until Jaydeep telephones Neha; Neha will come to the drawing room to answer the telephone call and Vikramjeet has to strangle her and leave. However, the plan falls apart when Neha kills Vikramjeet in self-defense.

Jaydeep reaches home and doctors the crime scene to frame Neha, who is shocked and vulnerable. The Public Prosecutor proves her guilt and she is sentenced to prison. However, Inspector Barua senses foul play and investigates for the truth to be revealed.

The truth is that Neha never had an affair with Sagar. Both of them were in a relationship before her marriage and reconnected after years as friends. Jaydeep had married Neha for her wealth, and concocted the murder plan to frame Neha and gain unfettered access to her wealth.

When exposed, Jaydeep kills himself and Neha is proven innocent.

== Cast ==
- Raj Babbar as Jaydeep
- Dimple Kapadia as Neha
- Suresh Oberoi as Sagar
- Danny Denzongpa as Inspector Barua
- Sharat Saxena as Vikramjeet "Vicky"
- Anupam Kher as Public Prosecutor

== Soundtrack ==
The music for all the songs were composed by Bappi Lahiri.

Song	Singer	Raga
"Kisi Nazar Ko Tera Intezar Aaj Bhi Hai"	Bhupinder Singh, Asha Bhosle	Bhairavi (Hindustani)
"Awaaz Di Hai Aaj Ek Nazar Ne"	Bhupinder Singh, Asha Bhosle	
"Tum Aur Main"	Asha Bhosle	
"Khali Peeli Pyar Se"	Ila Arun	
"Tu Ru Ru Ru"	Maya Ghosh	
