= Kali Ganga =

- Promotional Poster
- Directed by: Raj N. Sippy
- Written by: Kumar Ramsay; Anwar Khan (dialogues)
- Produced by: Kumar Ramsay
- Starring: Dimple Kapadia; Govinda; Anuradha Patel; Suresh Oberoi
- Cinematography: Ashok Gunjal
- Edited by: V. N. Mayekar
- Music by: Bappi Lahiri
- Production company: Ramsay Motion Pictures
- Release date: 1 June 1990
- Country: India
- Language: Hindi

Kali Ganga is a Bollywood action film released in 1990 and stars Dimple Kapadia in the title role of a dacoit, along with Govinda, Anuradha Patel, and Suresh Oberoi in pivotal roles.

== Plot ==
Ganga lives with her mother and two brothers, Chote and Govinda. One of her brothers, Chote, gets severely tortured by goons. A ruthless Thakur Hukumchand and his gang of four rowdies terrorise the village. They kill Chote and gang rape Ganga and destroy the whole family. Ganga became dacoit to take revenge.

== Cast ==
- Dimple Kapadia as Ganga
- Govinda as Govinda
- Prem Chopra as Thakur Hukumchand
- Anuradha Patel as Anu
- Suresh Oberoi as Inspector Shiva
- Sudhir as Shera
- Chirag Patel as Chote
- Tej Sapru as Jaggu

== Soundtrack ==
1. "Chhuo Na Chhuo Na Yu Mujhe Chhuo Na" – Alisha Chinai, Shailendra Singh
2. "Mere Dil Ne Sapna Jo Dekha Tha" – Mohammed Aziz
3. "Hawa Ye Hawa" – Uttara Kelkar
4. "O Maa Devi Maa" – S. Janaki
