= Drishti (film) =

- DVD cover
- Directed by: Govind Nihalani
- Written by: Govind Nihalani; Shashi Deshpande
- Produced by: Udbhav Productions
- Starring: Dimple Kapadia; Shekhar Kapur; Irrfan Khan; Mita Vasisht
- Cinematography: Govind Nihalani
- Edited by: Deepak Segal
- Music by: Kishori Amonkar
- Release date: 31 August 1990
- Running time: 171 minutes
- Country: India
- Language: Hindi

Drishti (transl. Vision) is a 1990 Indian Hindi-language drama film directed by Govind Nihalani, starring Dimple Kapadia, Shekhar Kapur and Irrfan Khan. The film depicts the marital life of an urban couple from an upper-class milieu in Mumbai and follows their trials and tribulations, infidelity, divorce, and meeting after years of separation.

It is the only film to have music direction by classical singer Kishori Amonkar, with lyrics by Vasant Dev. In 1991, it won the National Film Award for Best Feature Film in Hindi at the 38th National Film Awards, and was named the 5th Best Indian Film at the 55th Bengal Film Journalists' Association Awards, where Dimple Kapadia and Mita Vasisht were named Best Actress and Best Supporting Actress in the Hindi section.

== Plot ==
Happily married for eight years, Mumbai-based couple Sandhya and Nikhil live an affluent lifestyle in an urban, intellectual milieu along with their daughter Rashmi. Originally coming from middle-class families, the couple has managed to rise in their professional lives through merit and hard work: Sandhya is an editor in a publishing house and Nikhil is a research scientist. On their eighth wedding anniversary, a friend of theirs brings his nephew Rahul, who is a classical singer. Sandhya soon develops an attraction towards Rahul and despite loving her husband, embroils in an affair with him, which lasts a couple of months. Her friend Prabha is the only one who Sandhya confides in and let's know of the affair. Around this time, Sandhya finds out she is pregnant but they abort the child. About a year later, it is Nikhil who notifies Sandhya of his intention to leave, having fallen in love with a much younger Vrinda, his lab assistant. Sandhya is shattered by his decision, and although she pleads for him not to leave, they eventually separate. Four years after the divorce, Nikhil realizes he has never really loved Vrinda and wants to re-enter Sandhya's life. When he finally meets Sandhya after years of separation, wanting to reunite, in a very candid move, she decides to confess to him her affair with Rahul.

== Cast ==
The cast members are listed below:

- Dimple Kapadia as Sandhya
- Shekhar Kapur as Nikhil
- Mita Vasisht as Prabha
- Irrfan Khan as Rahul
- Vijay Kashyap as Ramesh
- Neena Gupta as Revati
- Navneet Nishan as Gita

== Production ==
Drishti is one film where Govind Nihalani decided to shift from socio-political themes on to love and marriage. He explained that this film was "one from the heart". He said he decided to employ an unusual format of "no plot, all peaks" and explained the film's purpose to "redefine the relationship between man and woman, to show the passage of woman to independence as an individual".

Naseeruddin Shah was originally cast as the male lead in 1989. Nihalani cast Kapadia to play opposite him—the first time he opted for a mainstream actress—calling her a "finely tuned instrument". For Kapadia too, the film was her first tryst with art cinema, and she said she was "totally involved in Sandhya". Nihalani eventually called her "the perfect choice" for the part.

Novelist Shashi Deshpande wrote the film's script, her only screenplay. The film was said to be adapted from or inspired by Ingmar Bergman's Scenes from a Marriage (1973). Nihalani constructed the film in eleven movements, each marked by a background song.

== Soundtrack ==
The film's music was composed by Kishori Amonkar, who also performed all the songs, with lyrics authored by Vasant Dev. This was the only Hindi film for which Amonkar composed music, and only the second after Geet Gaya Patharon Ne (1964) in which she sang.

#	Song	Singer(s)	Duration
1	"Sawaniya Sanjha Me"	Kishori Amonkar	4:45
2	"Ek Hi Sang Hote I"	Kishori Amonkar	5:24
3	"Ek Hi Sang Hote II"	Kishori Amonkar	4:31
4	"Meha Jhar Jhar Barsat Re"	Kishori Amonkar	5:03

== Reception ==
Drishti was a critical success, with the performances, particularly that of Kapadia, drawing praise. N. Krishnaswamy of The Indian Express called it a "taut psychological drama" and commended Nihalani's "photographic style", as well as the "sensitive" performances from the main cast, as well as the "haunting alaaps and soaring songs" composed and performed by Amonkar, all of which make the film "a searching look at upper-class marriages". In another review for The Indian Express, V. Shankar called the film "a sensitive, often brilliant portrayal of the oldest game in town", and argued that its distinctiveness lies in it being "everybody's film".

Subramani, in his book Altering Imagination (1995), wrote that the film shows Nihalani "in a new phase of development", credited the film's "supple pacing" with deepening the film's emotional effect, and believed the direction presented the film as "a mode of inquiry". He further asserted that "Drishti also shows Dimple Kapadia as an actress with hidden resources. Kapadia's Sandhya is vulnerable and intense and full of feminine wiles. It's an intelligent portrayal; at least in this film she appears to have filled the gap left by Smita Patil's absence".

In his book about Indian art cinema, author John W. Hood noted the film being a departure for Nihalani, who "explores a notably different approach" as evidenced in the film's "microcosmic" scope and "intense and concentrated" style. Hood praised the film as technically "superb", appreciating "Nihalani's genius for ensuring a relationship between actor and camera that is rarely predictable and never static" as well as his "fastidious concern for detail". According to Wood, "Particularly memorable in this film is the consistency of the direction over the remarkably realistic acting, especially in the brilliant performances of the two women, Dimple Kapadia as Sandhya and Mita Vasisht as Prabha".

== Awards ==
Year	Award	Category	Recipients	Result	Ref
1991	38th National Film Awards	Best Feature Film in Hindi	Govind Nihalani	Won	
1991	55th Bengal Film Journalists'; Association Awards	5th Best Indian Film	Drishti	Won	
1991	55th Bengal Film Journalists'; Association Awards	Best Actress (Hindi)	Dimple Kapadia	Won	
1991	55th Bengal Film Journalists'; Association Awards	Best Supporting Actress (Hindi)	Mita Vasisht	Won	

== Legacy ==
A 1993 issue of Frontline magazine, writing of Kapadia's win of the National Film Award for Best Actress for Rudaali (1993), suggested that Kapadia should have already earned the award for Drishti. In a review of Rudaali for Cinemaya in the same year, Chidananda Dasgupta made reference to Drishti, calling it "a sort of take-off on Bergman's Scenes From A Marriage" in which Kapadia "proved her fine acting ability" and wrote that in both Drishti and Rudaali, she "carries the film on her fine-boned but sturdy shoulders".

In 2002, The Tribune listed the film as one of the masterpieces of 1990. In a retrospective review, The Telegraph wrote in 2006 that "Drishti brings up an issue that’s universal". In 2018, the Film Heritage Foundation restored the film's negatives, which were in a poor condition. A 2020 article by Filmfare, listing Kapadia's best films, described the film as "a harsh look at monogamy", and wrote, "Dimple brought out all three facets of Sandhya through her bravura performance".
