= Antareen =

- Film poster
- Directed by: Mrinal Sen
- Written by: Saadat Hasan Manto (story); Mrinal Sen (screenplay)
- Based on: Baadsahat ka Khatma (End of Kingship)
- Produced by: NFDC; Doordarshan
- Starring: Anjan Dutt; Dimple Kapadia; Tathagata Sanyal
- Cinematography: Sashi Anand
- Music by: Sashi Anand
- Release date: 1993
- Running time: 91 minutes
- Country: India
- Language: Bengali

Antareen (The Confined) is a 1993 Bengali-language Indian film directed by Mrinal Sen. Although based on the 1950 Saadat Hasan Manto story Badshahat Ka Khatimah, the screenplay has a different ending. It stars Anjan Dutt and Dimple Kapadia. Antareen was the first non-Hindi project Kapadia took part in since Vikram (1986). She played a woman caught in a loveless marriage. Insisting on playing her part spontaneously, Kapadia refused to enroll in a crash-course in Bengali as she wrongly felt that she would be able to speak it convincingly. Her voice was eventually dubbed by actor Anushua Majumdar, something Kapadia was unhappy with.

At the 1993 National Film Award, it was awarded the National Film Award for Best Feature Film in Bengali.

== Synopsis ==
A young writer (Anjan Dutta), seeking inspiration, is living alone in a friend's old mansion in Calcutta. One night he starts talking to a stranger (Dimple Kapadia) over the phone. The conversation soon develops into a relationship as details of their lives are revealed. They chance met on a train, when Dimple was able to recognize him from his voice and way of talking, just as she reboarded the train at a way side station.

== Cast ==
- Anjan Dutt as The Writer
- Dimple Kapadia as The Woman
- Tathagata Sanyal
- Moushumi Majumder as the Woman's sister
