= Maarg =

1992 film by Maheshh Bhatt

- Directed by: Mahesh Bhatt
- Written by: Suraj Sanim
- Produced by: P. Raghnunath
- Starring: Vinod Khanna; Hema Malini; Dimple Kapadia
- Cinematography: Lawrence D'Souza
- Edited by: Dimpy Bahl
- Music by: Anu Malik
- Release date: 1992
- Country: India
- Language: Hindi

Maarg is a 1992 Indian Hindi film directed by Mahesh Bhatt. The film has Vinod Khanna, Hema Malini, Dimple Kapadia in lead roles. Critic Iqbal Masood of The Indian Express praised the film as "a powerful satire" and "a moving film with excellent performances."

== Theme ==
The film presents a romantic story between a religious woman, Aarti (Hema Malini), and Suraj (Vinod Khanna), a reformed criminal seeking redemption. Director Bhatt stated, "The subject of spirituality has tormented me for a long time."

== Cast ==
- Vinod Khanna as Suraj Singh
- Hema Malini as Aarti Devi
- Dimple Kapadia as Uma
- Paresh Rawal as Bodhraj
- Anupam Kher as Guru

== Music ==
Anand Bakshi wrote all lyrics.

| Song | Singer |
|---|---|
| "Jeevan Ko Sangeet" | Lata Mangeshkar |
| "Bas Chain Aa Gaya" | Mohammed Aziz |
| "Kaash Main Koi" | Mohammed Aziz |
| "Mere Mehboob Aa" | Asha Bhosle |
| "Tune To Jag Chhod" | Kavita Krishnamurthy |
