= Go Noni Go =

- Directed by: Sonal Dabral
- Written by: Sonal Dabral; Nikhil Sachan
- Produced by: Tanuj Garg; Atul Kasbekar; Sameer Nair; Deepak Segal
- Starring: Dimple Kapadia; Manav Kaul; Ayesha Raza Mishra; Athiya Shetty
- Cinematography: Vikas Sivaraman
- Edited by: Antara Lahiri
- Music by: Nariman Khambata; Rahul Pais
- Production companies: Applause Entertainment; Ellipsis Entertainment; Mrs Funnybones Movies
- Release date: 23 October 2024
- Running time: 114 minutes
- Country: India
- Language: Hindi

Go Noni Go is a 2024 Indian Hindi-language romantic drama film directed by Sonal Dabral in his directorial debut and written by Dabral and Nikhil Sachan. The film stars Dimple Kapadia in the title role as a woman in her late fifties who develops an unexpected romantic relationship with a younger man, with Manav Kaul and Ayesha Raza Mishra in supporting roles. Based on Kapadia's daughter Twinkle Khanna’s short story "Salaam Noni Appa", the film explores themes of love, companionship, and second chances, and premiered at the MAMI Mumbai Film Festival on 23 October 2024.

== Plot ==
Noni, a middle-aged woman, forms an unexpected romantic connection with her younger yoga instructor, Anand. As their relationship deepens, it draws scrutiny from those around her, particularly her outspoken sister Binni, forcing Noni to confront social expectations about age, independence, and love.

== Cast ==
- Dimple Kapadia as Noni
- Manav Kaul as Anand
- Ayesha Raza Mishra as Binni
- Athiya Shetty
- P. R. Balan
- Manoj Diwakar as Manohar
- Rohan Mehra

== Production ==
Producer Atul Kasbekar said the film is planned to eventually release on OTT platforms. Film director participated in the film by voicing over Noni's car Basanti. Actress Vidya Balan's father P. R. Balan also made his acting debut with this film.

== Reception ==
The film premiered at the MAMI film festival in Mumbai. The Statesman described the film as a "heartwarming romcom about love, second chances, and breaking societal norms". In a positive review, Sana Farzeen of India Today called it a "perfect feel-good film" and praised Kapadia's performance: "there aren't enough words to describe Dimple Kapadia's magic on screen", noting that her performance "makes you realise how much you have missed watching her".
