= Hum Kaun Hai? =

- Poster
- Directed by: Ravi Shankar Sharma
- Written by: Talat Rekhi
- Based on: The Others by Alejandro Amenábar
- Produced by: Soni Juneja
- Starring: Dimple Kapadia; Amitabh Bachchan; Dharmendra
- Cinematography: Ishwar R. Bidri
- Edited by: Rabiranjan Maitra
- Music by: Sanjoy Chowdhury
- Distributed by: 4U2C Films
- Release date: 3 September 2004
- Country: India
- Language: Hindi

Hum Kaun Hai? (transl. Who are we?) is a 2004 Indian Hindi-language horror film directed by Ravi Shankar Sharma. The film stars Amitabh Bachchan, Dimple Kapadia, and Dharmendra in lead roles. It is a remake of the 2001 Spanish film The Others.

== Plot ==
After the mysterious disappearance of her maid, butler, and gardener, Mrs. Sandra Williams, the wife of Major Frank, who lives in a palatial house with their two children, Sara and David, writes a letter to the local employment agency to get replacements. Martha Pinto, Edgar and Maria (a mute woman) apply for these vacancies. Sandra hires them and also lets them know that her children's eyes suffer from a condition that could cause them to be damaged by sunlight, hence the curtains are to be drawn at all times. Also she gets migraines by any loud noise, hence everyone must remain quiet, there is no electricity and all work must be done during the daytime, and the entire house is candle-lit. The staff gets busy with their work, and it is then Sara tells her mom that she has noticed other people in the house that are visible to her only, and she draws the picture of a male, a female (his wife), their son, Vicky, and an elder woman with magical powers. Sandra disbelieves her, but when she starts feeling someone's presence in her house, as well as hearing noises, she decides to investigate. She finds out that the letter she had sent to the employment agency is still lying in the mailbox. She must now find out how Martha, Edgar and Maria came to know of the vacancies, and of the presence of an album with dead people's photos. Watch as events beyond her control unfold, leading her, Sara and David face to face with the other unseen people in this household.

== Cast ==
- Amitabh Bachchan as Frank James Willams/ Major Frank John Willams (Dual role)
- Dharmendra as Virendra “Viru”
- Dimple Kapadia as Sandra Willams
- Moushumi Chatterjee as Martha Pinto, the butler
- Seema Rahmani as Maria, the maid
- Abhijit Lahiri as Edgar, the gardener
- Hansika Motwani as Sara Williams
- Master Rehmaan as David Williams
- Vikram Gokhale as Virendra's Boss
- Suhasini Mulay as Anita
- Prem Chopra as Anita's Husband
- Master Vicky as Vicky

== Production ==
The film was shot at Rajendra Kumar's sold bungalow.

== Reception ==
Arnab Banerjee of Hindustan Times gave the film 3 out of 5 stars and commented, "Mystical elements as a genre seldom catch the fancy of Bollywood. It comes as a whiff of fresh air thus to see supernatural elements woven into mainstream format in a film." Taran Adarsh from Bollywood Hungama gave the film 1.5 out of five stars, calling it "an experiment that may find its share of believers and non-believers." Adarsh praised the performances, particularly Kapadia's, writing that the film "revolves mostly around Dimple Kapadia's beliefs and perceptions and the actress is up to the task of making it look one thousand per cent convincing. Undeniably talented, Dimple's performance can be rightly referred to as the soul of the enterprise." BBC's Manish Gajjar commended Kapadia's work and argued that the film "has a great screenplay." Malishka Mendonsa of Rediff concluded in a negative review, "Hum Kaun Hai did not answer any questions for me. Instead, it left me asking, 'theatre mein iss waqt hum kyun hai? [Why are we in this theatre?]'" Rama Sharma of The Tribune, however, called it an "enthralling suspense thriller", and further noted, "With no smiles, no songs it is a clean spooky affair. Go for it if you have the spunk."

== See also ==
- List of ghost films
