= What the Fish =

- Theatrical release poster
- Directed by: Gurmeet Singh
- Written by: Story by Shashanka Ghosh; Screenplay: Tejpal Singh, Gurmeet Singh; Dialogues: Tejpal Singh
- Produced by: Viacom 18 Motion Pictures; Light Forms Pictures; K. R. Harish
- Starring: Dimple Kapadia
- Cinematography: TBA
- Edited by: Cheragh Todiwala
- Music by: Sandeep Chatterjee
- Production companies: Viacom 18 Motion Pictures; Tipping Point Films; Light Forms Pictures
- Distributed by: Viacom 18 Motion Pictures
- Release date: 13 December 2013
- Running time: 126 minutes
- Country: India
- Language: Hindi

What the Fish (stylized as *What the F!$#*) is a 2013 Indian comedy film starring Dimple Kapadia and directed by Gurmeet Singh. The film was produced by Viacom 18 Motion Pictures and Produced by K. R. Harish under Light Forms Pictures. It premiered in theaters on 13 December 2013.

== Cast ==
- Dimple Kapadia as Sudha Mishra
- Vishal Sharma as Rajpal
- Sumit Suri as Sumit
- Anand Tiwari as Neerav
- Deepti Pujari as Gopa
- Manu Rishi as Ravi
- Geetika Tyagi as Meenal
- Manjot Singh as Pummy
- Mithun Rodwittiya as Hooda
- Tejpal Singh as Behroopiya Chor
- Shruti Naik as Chudail

== Plot ==
The narrative unfolds when Sudha Mishra asks her niece's fiancé, Sumit, to look after her home and feed her fish, Mishti, during her month-long trip. She returns to discover an unexpected visitor in her bathroom. The film traces a chaotic series of events involving multiple roommates who stay in her home during her absence, each leading to multiple replacements of Mishti, the titular fish, reflecting the humorous chaos within.

== Production ==
The film was produced by K. R. Harish, who earlier collaborated with director Shashanka Ghosh at Channel V and Phat Phish, ultimately lending continuity to their creative ventures including Quick Gun Murugun (2009).
