= Jab Khuli Kitaab =

- Official release poster
- Directed by: Saurabh Shukla
- Written by: Saurabh Shukla
- Based on: Jab Khuli Kitaab by Saurabh Shukla
- Produced by: Sameer Nair; Deepak Segal; Naren Kumar; Saurabh Shukla; Mahesh Korade
- Starring: Pankaj Kapur; Dimple Kapadia; Aparshakti Khurana
- Cinematography: Adri Thakur
- Edited by: Kunal Walve
- Production companies: Applause Entertainment; Shoestrap Films
- Distributed by: ZEE5
- Release dates: November 2024 (IFFI); 6 March 2026
- Running time: 115 minutes
- Country: India
- Language: Hindi

Jab Khuli Kitaab (transl. When the Book Opened) is a 2024 Indian Hindi-language romantic comedy-drama film written and directed by Saurabh Shukla. Produced by Applause Entertainment and Shoe Strap Films, it is a cinematic adaptation of Shukla's own stage play of the same name. The film stars Pankaj Kapur and Dimple Kapadia as an elderly couple who decide to seek a divorce after 50 years of marriage.

The film premiered on the streaming service ZEE5 on 6 March 2026.

== Plot ==
Set in the picturesque town of Ranikhet, Uttarakhand, Gopal Chandra Nautiyal has spent the last two years devotedly caring for his wife, Anusuya, who has been in a coma. When Anusuya miraculously awakens, the family's joy is short-lived. During a moment of reflection, she confesses to a brief extra-marital affair that occurred decades earlier in their marriage.

Stunned and feeling betrayed by the revelation, the elderly Gopal decides to file for divorce, much to the shock of their grown children and the local community. The film follows the legal and emotional fallout as the couple navigates the proceedings with a young lawyer, eventually exploring themes of aging, forgiveness, and the complexity of long-term relationships.

== Cast ==
- Pankaj Kapur as Gopal Chandra Nautiyal
- Dimple Kapadia as Anusuya Nautiyal
- Aparshakti Khurana as RK Negi, the lawyer
- Manasi Parekh as Asha,the judge.
- Samir Soni as Param, Gopal and Anusuya's son
- Nauheed Cyrusi as Farnaaz
- Sunil Palwal
- Devyani Ratanpal

== Production ==
The film was officially announced in December 2021. Director Saurabh Shukla stated that the story was originally written as a screenplay before he adapted it into a play for the Aadhyam theater festival. Principal photography took place in late 2021 and early 2022, primarily in Ranikhet and other parts of Uttarakhand.

== Reception ==
The Times of India gave the film 3/5 stars, noting that while the "stellar performances" by Kapur and Kapadia keep the movie afloat, the transition from stage to screen feels "stagnant" in parts. News18 highlighted the emotional weight of the drama but felt the humor was occasionally forced.

Sukanya Verma of Rediff.com praised the "dignity" Kapadia brings to her role but remarked that the film struggles to maintain momentum. Scroll.in was more critical, describing it as an "open-and-shut case" that fails to fully capitalize on its unique premise. Amar Ujala and ABP News both appreciated the film's family-centric emotional core, particularly the chemistry between the lead pair.
