= Gardish =

- Theatrical release poster
- Directed by: Priyadarshan
- Written by: Priyadarshan
- Story by: Lohithadas
- Based on: Kireedam by Sibi Malayil
- Produced by: R. Mohan
- Starring: Shammi Kapoor; Jackie Shroff; Amrish Puri; Aishwarya; Farida Jalal; Dimple Kapadia
- Cinematography: Santosh Sivan
- Edited by: N. Gopalakrishnan
- Music by: Songs: R. D. Burman; Score: S. P. Venkatesh
- Production company: Shogun Films
- Distributed by: Eros Entertainment
- Release date: 10 September 1993
- Running time: 171 minutes
- Country: India
- Language: Hindi

Gardish (transl. Adversity/misfortune) is a 1993 Indian Hindi-language action crime film written and directed by Priyadarshan. The film stars Jackie Shroff, Shammi Kapoor, Aishwarya, Dimple Kapadia and Amrish Puri. It is a remake of the 1989 Malayalam film Kireedam. The film won two Filmfare Awards—Best Art Direction (Sabu Cyril) and Best Action (Thyagarajan), and received nominations for Best Actor (Shroff), Best Supporting Actor (Amrish Puri), and Best Supporting Actress (Kapadia).

== Synopsis ==
Vidya Bhalla, a young woman, wishes for her husband to be a fearless hero. She sees those desired qualities in Shiva Sathe, the son of Constable Purushottam Sathe, whose only dream is to see Shiva become a Police Inspector. Vidya informs her father, Prithviraj Bhalla, that she has found her desired husband, so the Bhallas and the Sathes meet, leading to the couple becoming engaged.

Purushottam arrests the son of a MLA and as a result he is transferred to the notorious Kala Chowki Police Station in Bombay. Upon arrival, he finds out that the Inspector in charge of the Police Station, Saini, has been severely beaten-up by don Billa Jilani and is hospitalized. Purushottam arranges for his entire family to relocate.

Shiva's brother-in-law approaches Prithviraj and informs him that Shiva has become an underworld don, after beating-up Billa Jilani, and now takes haftas and bribes. Prithviraj finds that Shiva has become a ruffian, and been arrested a number of times, much to the chagrin of his father. Prithviraj breaks off the alliance and informs Purushottam. Shortly thereafter, another fight breaks out and this time Shiva is arrested, held in a cell for several days, beaten up by his father and subsequently bailed out by a woman named Shanti. Eventually, Shiva kills Billa. The film ends with Purushottam declaring to Inspector Saini, that Shiva cannot be recommended to be an inspector, since in the eyes of the law he is a criminal. Shiva's photo is shown on the criminal's display board and credits roll.

== Cast ==
- Shammi Kapoor as Prithviraj Bhalla
- Jackie Shroff as Shiva Sathe
- Aishwarya as Vidya Bhalla
- Dimple Kapadia as Shanti
- Amrish Puri as Constable Purushottam Sathe, Shiva's father
- Farida Jalal as Laxmi Sathe, Shiva's mother
- Raj Babbar as Pratap (special appearance)
- Suresh Oberoi as Inspector Saini
- Anant Mahadevan as Constable Sawant
- Rakesh Bedi as Shiva's friend
- Annu Kapoor as Shiva's friend
- Asrani as Phoolwa's husband
- Kunickaa Sadanand as Phoolwa
- Mukesh Rishi as Billa Jilani
- Tej Sapru as Billa's henchman
- Cochin Haneefa as Bank robber
- Ajay Kapoor as Shiva's brother
- Nandu as a disruptive passerby
- Shagufta Ali as an item dancer in the song "Rang Rangeeli Raat Gaaye"

== Music ==
The original songs featured in the film were composed by R. D. Burman with lyrics written by Javed Akhtar.

No.	Title	Singer(s)	Length
1.	"Hum Na Samjhe"	S. P. Balasubrahmanyam
2.	"Ae Mere Deewanon"	S. P. Balasubrahmanyam, Asha Bhosle
3.	"Yeh Mera Dil To Pagal Hai"	S. P. Balasubrahmanyam, Asha Bhosle
4.	"Rang Rangeeli Raat Gaaye"	S. P. Balasubrahmanyam, Asha Bhosle
5.	"Tum Jo Mile"	Asha Bhosle, Sreekumar
6.	"Badal Jo Barse"	Asha Bhosle

== Reception ==
Mukul Kesavan from the magazine Manushi lauded Gardish as "a powerful, affecting film" The Indian Express praised the film's "script, vivid characters and powerful dialogues" and noted the actors' performances. Anurag Mathur of The Sunday Telegraph was critical of the film, dismissing it as "not even a film, but a series of action sequences strung together by guest appearances", although he singled out Kapadia for "excelling" in her part. India Today wrote, "Perhaps the best film to be churned out by the Hindi film factory this year. Jackie plays a would-be-inspector unwittingly embroiled in the world of crime. Puri is his helpless havildar father. The direction is deft and cinematography fabulous. Puri, after a long stint at uninteresting villain roles, gets to show his mettle. But the film belongs to the dazed and confused Jackie, who has done full justice to the role."
