= Saazish (1988 film) =

1988 Indian film

- Directed by: Rajkumar Kohli
- Produced by: Suresh Malhotra
- Starring: Raaj Kumar; Mithun Chakraborty; Raj Babbar; Dimple Kapadia; Anita Raj; Vinod Mehra
- Music by: Kalyanji-Anandji
- Release date: 22 July 1988
- Running time: 140 minutes
- Country: India
- Language: Hindi

Saazish is a 1988 Indian Hindi-language film directed by Rajkumar Kohli, starring Raaj Kumar, Mithun Chakraborty, Raj Babbar, Dimple Kapadia, Anita Raj, Vinod Mehra, Kader Khan and Amrish Puri. The film was a flop.

== Plot ==
In this convoluted plot, Diwan, Dr. Kalidas and another secret person run a crime syndicate. They take insurance policies with fake identities and then fake their own deaths and claim insurance. Prem Krishan, a crime reporter, unearths this nefarious plan but is killed by Diwan. Prem Krishan's step-brother Kailash is implicated in the murder.

Anand is in search of his sister who married her lover without informing him, and then gone missing. Anand finally finds her in a mental asylum and her husband is reported dead. Anand's friend Prakash finds evidence proving that Kailash is responsible for the murder.

As if his troubles are not enough, Kailash's step sister Meena who is also Anand's girl friend has a low opinion of Kailash. Chased by cops and by Anand, Kailash fakes his own death and returns to town with a fake identity. After a series of badly scripted events, Kailash proves his innocence. Prakash turns out to be the secret third villain (who cheated Anand's sister). All the bad guys are caught by police. Poor Anand does not get to protect his sister from the villains, but police inspector Saxena saves her.

== Cast ==
- Raaj Kumar as Kailash
- Mithun Chakraborty as Anand Kumar
- Raj Babbar as Prakash
- Dimple Kapadia as Meena
- Anita Raj as Roma
- Vinod Mehra as Inspector Saxena
- Jagdeep as 009
- Kader Khan as Dr. Kalidas
- Amrish Puri as Diwan
- Tej Sapru as Lobo
- Prem Krishen as Rajesh
- Bob Christo
- Jagdish Raj

== Music ==
Song	Singer
"Yeh Shahar Bada Mashoor Hai, Yeh Singapur Hai"	Kishore Kumar, Asha Bhosle
"Yeh Jawani Badi Deewani, Khatron Ki Hai Yeh Nishani"	Asha Bhosle, Amit Kumar
"Mera Intezaar Karti Ho, Karti Hoon"	Mohammed Aziz, Alka Yagnik
"Mere Sawaal Ka Tum Do Jawab"	Suresh Wadkar, Sapna Mukherjee
