= Leela (2002 film) =

2002 Indian film

- Directed by: Somnath Sen
- Produced by: Kavita Munjal; Anjalika Mathur
- Starring: Dimple Kapadia; Deepti Naval; Vinod Khanna
- Music by: Shantanu Moitra
- Distributed by: Lemon Tree Films
- Release date: 1 November 2002 (India)
- Running time: 97 min
- Countries: India; United States
- Language: English

Leela is a 2002 English-language drama film directed by Somnath Sen. The movie stars Dimple Kapadia and Deepti Naval. The film's story is loosely based on Summer of '42. The film premiered at Reel World Film Festivalm, Toronto, in 2005. It also was featured in the 2002 edition of the IAAC Film Festival, conducted by the Indian diaspora, which works to showcase the Indian films to the West.

== Plot ==
Leela is a professor from Bombay. Married to a popular poet, her life has always been prefixed with the title 'Nashaad's wife'. She wins a chance to be sent as a visiting professor to California, where she rediscovers herself, the woman she is, beyond the duties of a wife that she had always devoted her life to. Kris comes as a bright sunshine in her life, who makes her realise her own desires, the desires of the body. Is it going to be an happily ever after fairy tale? Or another Bollywood melodrama?

== Cast ==
- Dimple Kapadia as Leela
- Deepti Naval as Chaitali
- Amol Mhatre as Kris/ Krishna
- Vinod Khanna as Nashaad
- Gulshan Grover as Jai
- Brendan Hughes as Summer
- Kelly Gunning as JC
- Garrett Devereux as Chip
- Kyle Erby as Jamaal
- Michelle Van Wagner as Jennifer
- Sarayu Rao as Mira
- Partha Dey as Shantanu
- Sandeep Walia as Harsh
- Delna Rastomjee as Joya Chatterjee
- Gargi Sen as Maheed

== Music ==
1. "Champai Dhoop Ke Saye" - Shubha Mudgal
2. "Dhuan Uttha Hai" - Jagjit Singh
3. "Jaag Ke Kaati Raina" - Jagjit Singh
4. "Jabse Kareeb Ho Ke Chale" - Jagjit Singh
5. "Jabse Kareeb Ho Ke Chale v2" - Jagjit Singh
6. "Kanha Teri Bansuri" - Falguni Pathak, Dev Choudhury, Karsan Sagathia, K.K.
7. "Mavan Te Dhiyan" - Jaspinder Narula
8. "Tere Khayal Ki" - Jagjit Singh

== Production ==
The film was shot mostly in Los Angeles with funds raised by Kavita Munjal and Anjalika Mathur. This is the directorial debut of Somnath Sen. "It's a universal story that many women will be able to relate to," remarked Dimple Kapadia, on the sets.

== Critical reception ==
The film was well received by critics. Kevin Thomas of The Los Angeles Times called Leela "a worthy departure from the culture clash comedies that have marked an emerging Indian American cinema". Dave Kehr of The New York Times called it "an unusual combination of Bollywood and Hollywood sensibilities".

Anil. S. Arora, of Chowk, wrote that film could be considered "the first art film made on the Indian community in north America". He added that the film was about the taboo that sex still is to the Indian Community and their "inability to accept them as the basis for family relationships". He though was dissatisfied with the way Leela is portrayed as a faithful wife to a straying husband, which he wrote is quite outdated for a Mumbai woman who dwells on sexual equality.

The review in The Hindu was moderate, which mainly lauded Dimple Kapadia's acting, declared that the plot has many loose ends and signed off with a note that it is not a bad choice to watch "at the end of a long, lonely day". Deccan Herald wrote, "good performances, deft handling of a complex theme, unconventional method of storytelling, a crisp script, and of course, a taut storyline sure make Leela a movie that’s more than just a tale well told."

The Daily Telegraph declared it as a flop in its positive review on Shantanu Moitra.

== Recognition and awards ==
- Special Jury Award - Reel World Film Festival, Toronto (2002)
- Screened at the Commonwealth Film Festival, Manchester (2002)
