= Bees Saal Baad (1989 film) =

- Promotional Poster
- Directed by: Rajkumar Kohli
- Written by: P. D. Mehra; Lalit Mahajan
- Produced by: Nishi Kohli
- Starring: Mithun Chakraborty; Meenakshi Sheshadri; Dimple Kapadia; Shakti Kapoor; Vinod Mehra; Amjad Khan; Anupam Kher; Om Prakash
- Cinematography: B. Gupta
- Edited by: Waman Rao; Praful Vyas
- Music by: Laxmikant–Pyarelal
- Production company: Nishi Productions
- Release date: 3 February 1989
- Running time: 135 minutes
- Language: Hindi
- Budget: ₹1 crore

Bees Saal Baad (Hindi: बीस साल बाद) is a 1989 Hindi-language Indian horror film directed by Rajkumar Kohli, starring Mithun Chakraborty, Dimple Kapadia, Meenakshi Sheshadri, Vinod Mehra, Amjad Khan, Shakti Kapoor, Anupam Kher, and Om Prakash. The film was a superhit at the box office.

== Plot ==
The film begins with Suraj and Nisha in love and soon to be married. Thakur, who lusted for Nisha, kills Suraj, and as a result Nisha commits suicide.

Twenty years later, Kiran is the only child of wealthy widower Thakur. While she resides in Britain, her dad lives in a palatial house in rural India. When the time comes for her to return home, her dad arrives at the airport to meet her and is surprised to see her in the company of a young man whom she introduces as her husband Suraj. Thakur is shocked to see that he resembles the Suraj he murdered 20 years ago. Thakur overcomes his shock at seeing Suraj, but welcomes him.

While driving, Suraj sees a woman in white blocking the road, but his driver is unable to stop the car in time. They alight from the car to find that nobody is on the road. That night, Suraj has a dream about a woman clad in white who is summoning him, claiming that she is Nisha, his wife from a previous life. Using her magical powers she inserts a nail into one of Suraj's legs on a new-moon night. On the next new-moon night she inserts a nail into his other foot, then waits for Karva Chouth, the day that will put him completely under her control.

Nisha has an old score to settle with Thakur. A frantic Kiran will not give up her husband to Nisha, so she and her dad seek help from Tantrik Baba and Bhavani Baba. Will the Tantrik and Bhavani be able to assist them, or will they too fall prey to the vengeful spirit?

== Cast ==
- Mithun Chakraborty as Suraj
- Dimple Kapadia as Nisha
- Meenakshi Sheshadri as Kiran Thakur
- Vinod Mehra as Inspector Verma
- Amjad Khan as Bhavani Baba
- Om Prakash as Sarju
- Shiva Rindani as Badal
- Anupam Kher as Thakur
- Shakti Kapoor as Tantrik Baba
- Jagdeep as Chedhu
- Aruna Irani as Mithi
- Jankidas as Jankidas (Broker)
- Pinchoo Kapoor as Senior Police Officer
- Shiva Rindani as Badal
- Jayshree T. as Tara

== Soundtrack ==
Bees Saal Baad

Film score by Laxmikant–Pyarelal
- Genre: Feature film soundtrack
- Length: 25:16
- Label: T-Series

The music composed by Laxmikant–Pyarelal.

No.	Song	Singers	Lyrics	Raga
1	"Hum Tumhein Itna Pyar Karenge"	Anuradha Paudwal, Mohammad Aziz	Anand Bakshi	Shivaranjani
2	"Mere Saamne Tu Din Raat Rahe"	Mohammad Aziz, Sarika Kapoor	Anand Bakshi	
3	"Jago Jago Devi Mata"	Anuradha Paudwal	Anand Bakshi	
4	"O Baliye Ni Chal Chaliye"	Anuradha Paudwal, Shabbir Kumar and Sukhvinder	Anand Bakshi	
5	"Kitne Sawan Baras Gaye" (version 1)	Anuradha Paudwal	Anand Bakshi	
6	"Kitne Sawan Baras Gaye" (version 2)	Hariharan	Anand Bakshi	
