= Insaaf (1987 film) =

- Promotional Poster
- Directed by: Mukul Anand
- Written by: Madan Joshi; K.K. Shukla
- Starring: Vinod Khanna; Dimple Kapadia; Suresh Oberoi
- Release date: 19 June 1987
- Country: India
- Language: Hindi
- Budget: ₹14.5 million
- Box office: ₹75 million

Insaaf (transl. Justice) is a 1987 Bollywood action film directed by Mukul Anand, starring Vinod Khanna, Dimple Kapadia and Suresh Oberoi. The film was remade in Tamil as Chinnappadass with Sathyaraj. The film was the comeback film of Khanna after a five-year hiatus from acting.

== Cast ==
- Vinod Khanna as Avinash Kapoor
- Dimple Kapadia as Sonia / Dr. Sarita
- Suresh Oberoi as Mr. Agnihotri
- Dalip Tahil as Dilip Agnihotri
- Kruttika Desai as Geeta Kapoor
- Shakti Kapoor as Police Inspector Laxman Bhinde
- Shammi as Dhristi Kapoor , Avinash's mother
- Vikram Gokhale as Inspector General of Police Verma
- Mahesh Anand as Michael Fernandes
- Manik Irani as Raghu/ Watchdog
- Dinesh Hingoo as Judge
- Vikas Anand as Mohanlal Adhikari ,Trustee of College
- Leena Das as Dancer / Singer
- Ghanshyam Rohera as Constable Mishra

== Soundtrack ==
Farooq Kaiser wrote the songs.

Track#	Title	Singer(s)
1	"Mai Hu Tu Hai"	Alisha Chinai
2	"Nand Ka Lala Nand Gopal"	Anuradha Paudwal
3	"Sulagti Hain Aankhen" (sad)	Anuradha Paudwal
4	"Humsafar Milti Hai Manzil Thokare Khane Ke Baad"	Anuradha Paudwal
5	"Sulgati Hai Aankhen" (duet)	Anuradha Paudwal, Mohammed Aziz

== Reception ==
The film was a commercial success. Encyclopaedia of Indian Cinema wrote of the film that it "created a fantasy world of sex, crime and sin despite its occasional references to the actual, widely reported death of a prostitute who ‘fell’ from a multi-storey block of flats belonging to a businessman suspected of criminal dealings."
