= Tum Milo Toh Sahi =

- Directed by: Kabir Sadanand
- Written by: Kabir Sadanand; Sameer Siddiqui; Rajen Makhijani
- Produced by: Nikhil Panchamiya
- Starring: Nana Patekar; Dimple Kapadia; Mohnish Bahl; Suniel Shetty; Vidya Malvade; Rehan Khan; Anjana Sukhani; Amit Behl
- Cinematography: Pushan Kripalani
- Edited by: Kuldeep Mehan
- Music by: Sandesh Shandilya
- Production company: Fourth Wall Entertainment
- Release date: 2 April 2010
- Running time: 128 minutes
- Country: India
- Language: Hindi
- Box office: ₹3.52 crore

Tum Milo Toh Sahi is a 2010 Indian Hindi-language drama film directed by Kabir Sadanand starring Nana Patekar, Dimple Kapadia, Mohnish Bahl, Amit Behl, Suniel Shetty, Vidya Malvade, Rehan Khan and Anjana Sukhani. It was released on 2 April 2010.

== Plot ==
After retiring as a law clerk, Subramaniam retreats into himself, his memories about his mother, and his small flat. He rents out a room to Bikramjeet Singh, who has been expelled from the hostel, on the condition that he cannot invite any women to even visit him. A chance encounter with 'Lucky Cafe' restaurant owner, Delshad Nanji, first antagonizes him, then he relents and becomes a regular patron along with several students. He will soon be thrust into a legal battle when 'Blue Bell' - a multinational company - decides to take over the café, and are all set to sue Delshad for encroaching on this property.

== Cast ==
- Nana Patekar as Rajagopal Subramaniam
- Dimple Kapadia as Delshad Nanji/Delshad Irani
- Mohnish Behl as Rahul Sood
- Suniel Shetty as Amit Nagpal
- Vidya Malvade as Anita Nagpal
- Rehan Khan as Bikramjeet Singh
- Anjana Sukhani as Shalini Kasbekar
- Amit Behl as Mr. Akash Mehta
- Tanishaa in a special appearance
- Raghav Sachar as himself in a special appearance
- Vrajesh Hirjee as Jamshed Dinshaw “Jimmy” Irani
- Smita Jaykar as The Judge
- Neville Dadachanji as Manek
- Sarang Soni as Aryan Reddy
- Yathaarth Kansal as Ankur Khandelwal
- Pushtii S as Priyanka Bhardwaj
- Meher Acharya Dar as Delnaz Irani, Delshad's daughter
- Farid Amiri as Harry
- Yogendra as David
- Surendra Pal as Brigadier
- Priyesh Sagar as Bheem
- Mukesh Ahuja as Hostel Warden
- Narendra Gupta as Deptl store manager
- Rajendra Jadhav as taxi driver
- Honey Chhaya as Irani Anjuman Incharge
- Kishore Nandlaskar as bald old man Fiat car owner
- Srinivas Abrol as son of bald old man
- Jayram Polekar as Aslam Bilal
- Jagdish Chauhan as eunuch
- Poonam Mishra as Dept store counter girl
- Chayan Trivedi as Doctor in hospital
- Megami Mehta - Cute little girl at the store

== Soundtrack ==
No.	Title	Singer(s)	Length
1.	"Tum Milo To Sahi"	Shaan
2.	"O Janemann"	Raghav Sachar
3.	"Bekahuf Mohabbat"	Kunal Ganjawala
4.	"Chaal Haath Mila"	Sukhwinder Singh
5.	"Loot"	Dominique Cerejo
6.	"I Am Bad"	Kunal Ganjawala, Sunidhi Chauhan

== Reception ==
Though critics praised the performances of Nana Patekar and Dimple Kapadia, the movie on the whole received poor ratings. Tushar Joshi of Mid Daygave it Minty Tejpal of Bangalore Mirror said that Patekar and Kapadia are "a treat to watch" in an otherwise weak film. Gaurav Malani of The Economic Times gave it two stars, claiming it is not entertaining enough, but wrote of the leads, "Nana Patekar is in his elements inducing humour through his straight-faced expressions. Dimple Kapadia as the Parsi café owner is absolutely delightful. Together, Nana and Dimple share good chemistry and complement each other pretty well." Ajit Duara of Open magazine concluded his review saying, "Dimple is ravishing, yes, but the amateurish acting, typecasting and godawful songs let you down." Mayank Shekhar of Hindustan Times gave it anegative review. Anupama Chopra was critical of the film, the script and the story, but praised the leads. A more positive review came from The Times of India, "Watch it for the veterans' winsome act, the spirit of Mumbai and for a tale told well."
