= Zakhmi Sher =

- Movie Poster
- Directed by: Dasari Narayana Rao
- Written by: Rahi Masoom Reza (dialogues)
- Screenplay by: Dasari Narayana Rao
- Story by: Dasari Narayana Rao
- Produced by: Pradeep Sharma
- Starring: Jeetendra; Dimple Kapadia
- Cinematography: M. Kannappa
- Edited by: B. Krishnam Raju
- Music by: Laxmikant–Pyarelal
- Production company: TUTU Films
- Release date: 28 September 1984
- Running time: 141 minutes
- Country: India
- Language: Hindi

Zakhmi Sher (transl. Wounded Lion) is a 1984 Indian Hindi-language action film produced by Pradeep Sharma under the TUTU Films banner and directed by Dasari Narayana Rao. Starring Jeetendra and Dimple Kapadia with the music composed by Laxmikant–Pyarelal, it is a remake of the Telugu language film Bobbili Puli. The film marks Kapadia's return to cinema after Bobby (1973).

== Cast ==
- Jeetendra as Major Vijay Kumar Singh
- Dimple Kapadia as Advocate Anu Gupta
- Jayasudha as Anandi
- Amrish Puri as Swami Kashinath Singh
- Shakti Kapoor as Arsonist
- Nilu Phule as Lala (Anandi's father)
- Om Shivpuri as Mr. Gupta
- Vinod Mehra as Police Inspector
- Bharat Bhushan as Judge
- Jeevan as Lawyer
- Rohini Hattangadi

== Soundtrack ==
Lyrics: Santosh Anand

Song	Singer
"O Mere Honewale Bachchon Ki Amma"	Kishore Kumar, Asha Bhosle
"Hari Aao, Hari Aao, Hari Aao"	Lata Mangeshkar
"Dhak Chiki Dhak, Mazaa Aane Laga"	Alka Yagnik, Hemlata
"Yeh Janmbhoomi Janmdevi"	Suresh Wadkar
"Dekha Jo Tujhko To Pyar Ho Gaya, Dil Mera Tujh Pe Nisar Ho Gaya"	Shabbir Kumar, Kavita Krishnamurthy
