= Insaniyat Ke Dushman =

- Directed by: Rajkumar Kohli
- Written by: K. K. Singh; Charandas Shokh; Lalit Mahajan
- Produced by: Rajkumar Kohli
- Starring: Dharmendra; Shatrughan Sinha; Raj Babbar; Sumeet Saigal; Dimple Kapadia; Anita Raj; Amjad Khan; Shakti Kapoor; Kader Khan; Aruna Irani; Smita Patil
- Cinematography: Kaka Thakur
- Edited by: Shyam
- Music by: Anu Malik
- Production company: Shankar Movies
- Distributed by: Goldmines Telefilms
- Release date: 2 January 1987
- Running time: 159 minutes
- Country: India
- Language: Hindi

Insaniyat Ke Dushman (transl. Enemies of Humanity) is a 1987 Hindi-language action drama film directed by Rajkumar Kohli. The film features an ensemble cast of Dharmendra, Shatrughan Sinha, Raj Babbar, Sumeet Saigal, Dimple Kapadia, Anita Raj, Amjad Khan, Shakti Kapoor, Kader Khan, Aruna Irani, along with Smita Patil in a special appearance. The film revolves around a young lawyer seeking revenge against the perpetrators who raped his sister and drove her to suicide. It also contains a subplot revolving around an honest cop and his brother, and how the need for wealth drives them apart and leads to a situation where the cop is forced to arrest his own brother.

Insaniyat Ke Dushman released worldwide on 2 January 1987, and received mixed to negative reviews, with criticism for the use of rape as a subject for taking revenge, courtroom sequences and some characters overplaying their roles. Some praise was focused on the performances of Dharmendra and Raj Babbar. At the box office, the film was a commercial success and was one of the highest-grossing films of the year. It marked the beginning of a golden year for Dharmendra, as he went on to give six more hits in the same year. The film was also notable for being one of the few box office hits which broke the jinx of the first release of a calendar year flopping commercially.

== Cast ==
- Dharmendra as Inspector Shekhar Kapoor
- Shatrughan Sinha as Advocate Kailashnath
- Raj Babbar as Ajay Verma
- Dimple Kapadia as Shilpa
- Smita Patil as Laxmi
- Anita Raj as Shashi
- Sumeet Saigal as Prakash Kapoor
- Shakti Kapoor as Shakti Singh
- Amjad Khan as Pratap Singh
- Kader Khan as Jagmohan Mishra
- Aruna Irani as Mona
- Om Prakash as Jailor Saxena
- Iftekhar as Senior Police Officer Shyamlal Kumar
- Paintal as Das
- Urmila Bhatt as Sheetal
- Krishan Dhawan as Defence Lawyer Ramakant
- Chandrashekhar as Inspector Surinder Verma , Shilpa,s dad
- Pinchoo Kapoor as Judge Bhargav
- Jankidas Mehra as Manager Sitaram of Shakti Singh
- Abhi Bhattacharya as Judge
- Gurbachan Singh as Jagga, the fake doctor
- Vikas Anand as Dr Mohandas Malhotra

== Production ==
According to Outlook magazine:

"Insaniyat Ke Dushman went to the courts and back countless times despite the fact that similar subjects on the politician-crime nexus had been passed by the censors with minor cuts. In this film, however, 42 cuts were recommended and the makers fought tooth and nail until the figure came down to 17."

== Music ==
"Pyar Jab Bhi Hoga Naseeb Se Hoga" was written by Sameer, the rest of songs were penned by Indeevar.

Song	Singer
"Loha Loha Loha"	Shabbir Kumar
"Aisa Ladka Bana"	Shabbir Kumar, Asha Bhosle
"Om Sai Ram"	Suresh Wadkar, Asha Bhosle
"Mahiya Mahiya"	Suresh Wadkar, Asha Bhosle
"Pyar Jab Bhi Hoga"	Suresh Wadkar

== Release and reception ==
The film was a commercial success. Jay Robert Nash, author of The Motion Picture Guide, called it "a story of violence and revenge which pits the lawless against the lawmen." Firoze Rangoonwala of Arab Times said the film had "a number of stars and a bulky melodrama", arguing this is what helped the film become a commercial success. The Telegraph panned the film as being "filled with violence, depravity and large doses of overacting".
