= Maya Ghosh =

Bangladeshi actress (1949–2019)

- মায়া ঘোষ
- Born: 31 December 1949; Jessore, East Bengal, Dominion of Pakistan
- Died: 19 May 2019 (aged 69); Jessore, Bangladesh
- Occupation: Actress
- Spouse: Dileep Ghosh
- Children: 3

Maya Ghosh (31 December 1949 – 19 May 2019) was a Bangladeshi film, stage and television actress. She acted in more than 200 films. She was a freedom fighter.

== Biography ==
Ghosh was born on 31 December 1949 in Jessore. She took part in the Liberation War of Bangladesh. She used to cook for the freedom fighters in a refugee camp in Kolkata.

Ghosh made her debut on the silver screen with Patal Bijoy in 1981. She acted in television and stage too. She was last seen in DB in 2016 which was a television series of ATN Bangla.

Ghosh was married to Dileep Ghosh. He died in 2002. They had three children.

Ghosh died on 19 May 2019.
