= Pati Parmeshwar (film) =

1989 film by Madan Joshi

- Directed by: Madan Joshi
- Produced by: R.K. Nayyar
- Starring: Dimple Kapadia; Shekhar Suman; Sudha Chandran
- Release date: 6 June 1990
- Country: India
- Language: Hindi

Pati Parmeshwar is a Hindi film. It was released in 1990 and stars Dimple Kapadia. The film was released following a court battle with the Central Board of Film Certification (CBFC), where it was banned for screening due to its perceived glorification of submissiveness of women. The CBFC ruled to ban the film's screening, refusing to rate it, because of the portrayal of the character of Rekha, the forgiving wife who the CBFC thought was in "ignoble servility" of her husband. The Bombay Court found the ban unjustified.

== Cast ==
- Dimple Kapadia ... Tara/Durga
- Shekhar Suman ... Vijay
- Sudha Chandran ... Rekha
- Rajesh Puri
- Alok Nath
- Om Shivpuri ... Rekha's father
