= Mukul S. Anand =

Indian director and producer (1951–1997)

- Born: 11 October 1951; Mumbai, Maharashtra, India
- Died: 7 September 1997 (aged 45); Utah, USA
- Education: Sainik School Satara
- Occupation: film director
- Spouse: Anita
- Children: 2
- Relatives: Inder Raj Anand, Tinnu Anand

Mukul S. Anand (11 October 1951 – 7 September 1997) was an Indian film director and producer. He was the nephew of veteran film scriptwriter Inder Raj Anand and cousin of actor and director Tinnu Anand.

== Career ==
Mukul S. Anand made his debut as a director with the suspense thriller Kanoon Kya Karega (1984), which was inspired by the Hollywood film Cape Fear. His second film Aitbaar (1985) was inspired by Alfred Hitchcock's classic Dial M for Murder. The film that first gained him recognition was the epic film Sultanat (1986), which brought together real-life father and son Dharmendra and Sunny Deol for the first time and introduced actress Juhi Chawla. That same year Anand also directed the thriller Main Balwan.

His first box-office success was Insaaf (1987), the film responsible for "re-introducing" Vinod Khanna to films after a hiatus. Anand's next film, Maha-Sangram (1990), reunited him with Vinod Khanna.

He finally hit the big league with the Scarface-inspired crime thriller Agneepath (1990) with Amitabh Bachchan in the lead role, which won Amitabh a National Award for Best Actor. He was reunited with Bachchan for the family drama Hum (1991), which was a box-office success and featured the popular song "Jumma Chumma". He worked with Bachchan for the final time in the epic film Khuda Gawah (1992) which won him the Filmfare Best Director Award. His last completed film, Trimurti (1995), which had a multi-star cast including Jackie Shroff, Anil Kapoor and Shahrukh Khan, failed to do well at the box office. The film he was working on at the time of his death in 1997 was Dus, which remained incomplete and unreleased, although the film's music did end up being released posthumously.

== Personal life ==
Inder Raj Anand who was a film scriptwriter from the late 1940s through to the late 1980s was Mukul Anand's uncle. Mukul's cousin is actor and director Tinnu Anand. Mukul was married to Anita and had two children.

== Death ==
Mukul died of a heart attack at the age of 45 on 7 September 1997. He was on location for action film Dus in Utah. The film began production in May 1997 and 40% of the shooting had been completed by August.

== Filmography ==
Year	Film	Director	Producer	Writer	Notes
1983	Kanku Ni Kimat	Yes	No	No	Gujarati film
1984	Kanoon Kya Karega	Yes	No	No	
1985	Aitbaar	Yes	No	No	
1986	Main Balwan	Yes	No	No	
1986	Sultanat	Yes	No	No	
1987	Insaaf	Yes	No	No	
1990	Maha-Sangram	Yes	No	No	
1990	Agneepath	Yes	No	No	
1991	Hum	Yes	No	No	
1991	Khoon Ka Karz	Yes	No	No	
1992	Khuda Gawah	Yes	No	Screenplay	
1995	Trimurti	Yes	No	No	
1996	Army	No	Yes	No	
1997	Prithvi	No	Yes	No	
Unreleased	Dus	Yes	No	Yes	
