= Subramani =

Fijian author, essayist, and literary critic

- Born: 20 June 1943 (age 83); Labasa, Fiji
- Education: Labasa College; University of Canterbury; University of Brunswick
- Occupations: Author, essayist, critic
- Years active: 1963–present
- Notable work: Fiji Maa: A Mother of a Thousand Dauka Purana

Subramani (born 20 June 1943) is a Fijian author, essayist, and literary critic. According to The Literary Encyclopedia, he is "one of Fiji's leading prose fiction writers, essayists, and critics". His essays have dealt with multiculturalism, education, and cinema. Subramani writes fiction and non-fiction in English and Fiji Hindi, and has combined writing with university administration. He has served in all three universities in Fiji and has been a Dean, Pro Vice Chancellor and Acting Vice Chancellor. He has established himself as a novelist, short story writer, essayist and a literary critic. He has written on education, language, the university, cinema and civil society. In his fiction, as a bilingual writer, and working from the intersection of two languages, he been able to depict, in the words of the Samoan novelist, Sia Figiel, the "struggles of Fijian society and present us with a haunting salusalu of melancholy, despair, anguish, madness, terror, loss interlaced with moments of satire and humour that encapsulates the history and experience of men and women and children caught up in the violent shadow of colonialism".

Essays of Subramani's such as "A Room to Write" and "The Children of Ramchandramanus Country", reveal that he started writing fiction when he was at high school at a time when there no Fijian writing or authors. The obstacles he met in his writing career made him very sympathetic to aspiring writers, both young and old. He was a leading figure in the literary renaissance that happened in the South Pacific in the 1970's when the small island states were becoming politically independent. He worked with writers like Albert Wendt, Marjorie Crocombe, Konai Thaman, Satendra Nandan, Epeli Hau’ofa and Raymond Pillai, editing the literary journal Mana, organizing workshops for young writers, and teaching and critiquing literary works. Along with his own writing, he continues to mentor new emerging writers. He teaches literature and many of his students have become well-known writers.

In 1978, Subramani's short story "Marigolds" won a South Pacific literary contest that marked the beginning of an outstanding literary career. The first book he published was The Indo-Fijian Experience (1979) that has become a classic work. It commemorated the centenary of Indian settlement in Fiji. It explores the interplay of history and the fiction in depicting salient aspects of the experience of indenture, and thus for the first time Fijian historians (Ahmed Ali and Brij Lal) and creative writers (Raymond Pillai, Satendra Nandan, Subramani) are featured together to define the emerging Indo-Fijian identity.

== Early life ==
Subramani attended All Saints Primary School and then went to Labasa secondary school where he was the Dux of the school that is why he was selected by the Ministry of Education to study at the Suva Grammar School. He secured a scholarship to study in New Zealand and graduated from the University of Canterbury with a degree of Bachelor of Arts in English in the year 1966. He also received Diploma in Teaching in the year 1967. After teaching for a couple of years, he received a Commonwealth Scholarship to study literature in Canada and gained a master's degree in English from the University of New Brunswick (Canada). He received his Ph.D. from the University of the South Pacific, Suva (Fiji). Subramani taught at high school and was a senior education officer in charge of the English curriculum with the Fiji’s Ministry of Education, both for a short period.

Subramani was a Fulbright Scholar at the Johns Hopkins University, and a post-doctoral Fellow at the University of Birmingham, UK. He has been a visiting writer and professor to many countries, including India and Japan. Thus, he accumulated a great deal of experience in order to follow the main goal in his life, that is, to write books.

While following his writing career, and performing the role of a public intellectual, the author served in the Governments' Advisory Council and as Chief of Media Authority in the hope of influencing policies. This was very short-lived.

== Literary career ==
Subramani has gradually evolved as a creative writer from his childhood. His father had come to Fiji as an indentured worker. He was a cook cum gardener at an overseer’s bungalow from where he collected discarded books for Subramani who was still in primary school. Subramani was a voracious reader from childhood which resulted into his dream to become a writer. He became the editor of the journal Mana from 1976 TO 1978, while he continued to write his own short fiction. Subramani’s short stories were published in a number of journals and anthologies. His short story "Marigolds" won the South Pacific Association of Commonwealth Literature and Language Studies short story completion in 1978. In the following year, "Gamalian's Woman" became a highly commended short story, as was "Dear Primitive" in a European short-story competition. Hetal Patel's book on the author, A writer at Work in Fiji (2014, 2021) reveals that the trajectory of the writer's writing is determined by the different phases of engagement in his society. It was expected that after The Indo-Fijian Experience his vision would enlarge to include the South Pacific because of his involvement with writing in the region as the editor of Mana. Thus his book South Pacific Literature; From Myth to Fabulation (1985, 1993) came into being as a foundational text to provide the much-needed dialogue to the writers of the region. It remains a pioneering publication on the literatures of the South Pacific region that includes Samoa, Tonga, Vanuatu, Solomon Islands, Cook Islands, Kiribati and Fiji. Meanwhile Subramani continued to write his Fijian short stories, collected together in an anthology called The Fantasy Eaters (1988). The book is expanded into a larger volume Wild Flowers (2017) with the addition of newer stories. Although intuition is the writer's greatest strength in these stories, the perceptive reader will also find him probing into the writer’ craft of making narratives, weighing such matters as the authority of the narrator, reliable and unreliable storytellers, disembodied voices, classical realism and the world of partial truths, and plot less narratives as in his novella Gone Bush. In his next book After Narratives; The Pursuit of Reality and Fiction (1990), he invites a variety of narrative makers –theologians, historians, critics and fiction writers –to contribute to an interdisciplinary inquiry into the social character of narratives.

The military coups of 1987 in Fiji and the writer’s role in society at the time produced Altering Imagination (1995), a collection of speeches, essays and reviews. The book demonstrates most visibly "the writer at work in his society". The content is divided in two parts: Reconciling and Responsibility. The blurb says: " … the main arguments implicit in the book are as follows: that reading and writing are forms of political activity and are connected to the struggle for liberation; the initial responsibility in the task of reconciling is coming to terms with images, stereotypes, and scapegoating that shape our attitude to race and cultural difference; the way an individual makes choices creates history and determines political formulation; and reconciliation means struggling together for national projects of justice and emancipation." The author says in the Introduction that "The book is addressed to the people of Fiji; it is also dedicated to them."

The sudden appearance of Dauka Puraan , written in Fiji Hindi, in the year 2001 caused bewilderment among those who had followed Subramani as a writer in the English language. A novel in "broken Hindi" was seen as a transgression on the part of a Professor in English (according to the pundits in the community Fiji Hindi is still viewed as a substandard language "without a grammar", thus incapable of serious literary or philosophical discourses). In any case the novel went on to win considerable acclaim, and Subramani was felicitated at the 7th World Hindi Conference in Suriname in 2003 for his contribution to Hindi. Subramani’s second novel in Fiji Hindi, Fiji Maa; Mother of a Thousand (2018), took more than a decade to write; the writer’s magnum opus of 1026 pages is written from the perspective of a female protagonist and depicts the lives of women from varied backgrounds, including, for the first time, a woman from the iTaukei community whose heart-warming friendship with the main character forms an important centre of interest in the novel . The novel has been seen as offering a new meaning to the notion of woman's emancipation. The well-known literary critic and theorist, Vijay Mishra, has given the highest opprobrium to Dauka Puraan and Fiji Maa: "In two extraordinary novels –and needless to say the achievement is both monumental and unparalleled – Subramani has created an archive for the language as well as encyclopedic source texts for an understanding quotidian Fiji Indian life works. There is a verse in the Mahabharata that declares yad iha asti tad anyatra: yad na iha asti na tad kvacit (whatever is here is found elsewhere; but what is not here is found nowhere). The Fiji Indian reader comes to the same conclusion when reading Fiji Maa and Subramani’s earlier, founding novel, Dauka Puraan."

Subramani's next book is not in Fiji Hindi but English. Unlike Ngũgĩ wa Thiong'o, Subramani has not turned away from English, nor does he insist that Indo-Fijian writers should write in Fiji Hindi. He would rather want more writers to work bilingually because he sees there is much to be gained creatively by being firmly rooted in two linguistic worlds, and having two world-views; that might well allow writers to push the boundaries of postcolonial writing. In his new book Reason to Imagine(2020) there is a great deal of discussion of linguistic issues and Pacific epistemologies. Subramani expresses great anxiety about the future of Hindi and the iTaukei language—according to him both are on the verge of becoming endangered languages. The number of young people studying Hindi is in sharp decline at high school and tertiary levels. And the amount of literature in iTaukei language has remained insignificant. There is no novelist, poet or dramatist in the language. The epistemological task that Subramani defines for Pacific scholars is to create new cultural paths from competing systems of knowledge in the region (western, Oceanic and eastern) by drawing more from vernacular energies.

== Awards and prizes ==
- Awarded The Member of the Order of Fiji 2019.
- World Hindi Day Felicitation Fiji 2017
- National Award, Service to Society 2016
- Distinguished Professor, North Gujarat University, Patan 2005
- Dauka Puraan (novel in Fiji Hindi) honored at the 7th World Hindi Conference, Suriname in 2003
- Japan Foundation 2002
- Fulbright Scholarship 1992
- Indian Council of Cultural Relations 1989–90
- Japan Foundation 1989
- Association of Commonwealth Universities Post-doctoral Scholarship 1985–86
- East-West Center Scholarship 1978–80
- Commendation SPACLALS( South Pacific) Short Story Contest 1979
- Commendation ACLALS (European) Short Story Contest 1979
- Winner SPACLALS Short Story Contest 1978
- Canadian Government Scholarship 1970–72
- Fiji Government Scholarship 1964–67
- Commendation Commonwealth Essay Competition 1963
- Dux, Labasa Secondary School 1961

== Bibliography ==
Sources:

- Subramani, ed. (1978). The Indo-Fijian Experience. University of Queensland Press. ISBN 978-0-7022-1386-1.
- Subramani (1985). South Pacific Literature: From Myth to Fabulation (Reprinted with two new chapters and an Introduction in 1992. ed.). University of the South Pacific: Institute of Pacific Studies. ISBN 978-982-02-0080-7.
- Subramani (1988). The Fantasy Eaters: Stories from Fiji. Three Continents Press. ISBN 978-0-89410-631-6.
- Subramani, ed. (1990). After Narrative: The Pursuit of Reality and Fiction. Suva: University of the South Pacific. ISBN 982-01-0063-1
- Subramani (1995). Altering Imagination. Fiji Writers' Association. ISBN 978-982-328-001-1.
- Subramani (1995). LL102 Pacific Literature in English: Course Book. University Extension, The University of the South Pacific. ISBN 978-982-03-1333-0.
- Subramani (1998). Introduction and Assignments. University Extension, The University of the South Pacific. ISBN 978-982-03-2086-4.
- Subramani (2001). Dauka Puraan. New Delhi: Sṭar Publication; Distributors- the University Book Centre. ISBN 978-81-7650-035-7. OCLC 48223675.
- Subramani (2004). Retreat: A Three Act Ply. Performed in Sydney.
- Subramani, Introduction to Pacific Literature. Suva: USP, 1989. Revised in 2004.
- Subramani (2007). Kala Ki Talaash. New Delhi: Sṭar Publication. ISBN 978-81-7650-292-4.
- Subramani (2008). Retreat; A Three-Act Play, Dreadlocks Interrupted, Suva. Vol. 5 (Play)
- Subramani (2008). Sea Wall, One-act play, Dreadlocks Interrupted, Suva, pp. 158–178 (Play)
- Subramani, ed. (2009). Shifting Location: Indo-Fijian Writing from Australia. Casula Powerhouse. ISBN 978-1-876418-95-3.
- Subramani (2011). A Play of Many Part. Suva: Star Printers.
- Subramani (2012). Human Values Education. Lautoka: Institute of Sri Sathya Sai Education.
- Subramani (2016). Reclaiming the Nation, Lautoka, Lautoka: Vicas Press.
- Subramani, ed. (2016). New Fijian Writing, Fijian Studies Online. doi:10.1080/17449858708589013
- Subramani. (2017). Wild flowers. Suva [Fiji]: USP Press, University of the South Pacific. ISBN 978-982-01-0963-6.
- Subramani. (2018). Fiji Maa: Mother of a Thousand. Suva [Fiji]: USP Press, University of South Pacific. ISBN 978-982-01-0990-2
- Subramani. (2020). Reason To Imagine. India: Justfiction Edition. ISBN 978-620-0-10818-0
- www.youtube.com: Subramani on Creative Writing (Total no. of videos: 25)
