= List of Hindi songs recorded by S. Janaki =

S. Janaki was an Indian singer who has sung over 10,000 songs in various Indian languages. The following is a list of Hindi songs recorded by her:

== 1950s ==
=== 1958 ===
Film	Song	Composer(s)	Writer(s)	Co-artist(s)
Ramayan	"Surya Pataaka Ki Chhaon Mein"	K. V. Mahadevan	Saraswati Kumar Deepak	Mohammed Rafi
Ramayan	"Honge Ram Raja Aaj"	K. V. Mahadevan	Saraswati Kumar Deepak	Mahendra Kapoor
Ramayan	"Bolen Hum Bolo Tum"	K. V. Mahadevan	Saraswati Kumar Deepak	Mohammed Rafi, Mahendra Kapoor
Ramayan	"Naa Tum Kehti Baatein"	K. V. Mahadevan	Saraswati Kumar Deepak	solo
Ramayan	"Bolo Naa Saiyan"	K. V. Mahadevan	Saraswati Kumar Deepak	solo

== 1960s ==
=== 1960 ===
Film	Song	Composer(s)	Writer(s)	Co-artist(s)
Durgamata	"Pardesi Raja Man"	G. K. Venkatesh	S. R. Saaz	solo
Durgamata	"Jeevan Se Pyara	G. K. Venkatesh	S. R. Saaz	solo
Durgamata	"Nainan Se Laagi"	G. K. Venkatesh	S. R. Saaz	solo
Durgamata	"Amba Jagat Mata"	G. K. Venkatesh	S. R. Saaz	solo

=== 1961 ===
Film	Song	Composer(s)	Writer(s)	Co-artist(s)
Mera Suhag	"Ras Man Mein Bhar Le"	Arun Raghavan	Vinod Sharma	P. Susheela
Mera Suhag	"Chura Liya Tanne Chhora"	Arun Raghavan	Vinod Sharma	solo
Mera Suhag	"Chheen Ke Dil Ye Tu Le Ja"	Arun Raghavan	Vinod Sharma	solo
Meri Bahen	"Salone Saiyaan"	G. Ramanathan/Dhaniram	Pandit Indra Chandra	solo
Meri Bahen	"Durgati Machhaliya"	G. Ramanathan/Dhaniram	Pandit Indra Chandra	solo

=== 1962 ===
Film	Song	Composer(s)	Writer(s)	Co-artist(s)
Hamen Bhi Jeeme Do	"Aayi Balma Kya Chal"	S. M. Subbaiah Naidu	B. S. Kalla	

=== 1963 ===
Film	Song	Composer(s)	Writer(s)	Co-artist(s)
Chakravarthy Vishvamadithya	"Jahan Kahin Kali Khili"	P Nageshwar Rao	Saraswati Kumar Deepak	P. Susheela
Chakravarthy Vishvamadithya	"Jay O Teri Manbasiya"	P Nageshwar Rao	Saraswati Kumar Deepak	P. Susheela
Chakravarthy Vishvamadithya	"Yeh Ban Ki Chidiya"	P Nageshwar Rao	Saraswati Kumar Deepak	solo
Dil Ek Mandir	"Paalanhaare Ram Hai"	Shankar–Jaikishan	Shailendra	solo

=== 1964 ===
Film	Song	Composer(s)	Writer(s)	Co-artist(s)
Jhanda Ooncha Rahe Hamara	"Vaadi Hai Sama"	Ghantasala, Gandharva	Shrivas	
Teen Dost	"Koi Chaturai"	T R Papa	Prem Dhawan	A. P. Komala, Manna Dey
Teen Dost	"Rasiya Mere Man Basiya"	T R Papa	Prem Dhawan	P. B. Sreenivas

=== 1967 ===
Film	Song	Composer(s)	Writer(s)	Co-artist(s)
Bhakt Prahlad	"Nazar Naa Laage"	Saluri Rajeshwara Rao, Rajagopal Krishnan	P. L. Santoshi	P. B. Sreenivas
Bhakt Prahlad	"Aaj Nahin Mere"	Saluri Rajeshwara Rao, Rajagopal Krishnan	P. L. Santoshi	P. Susheela
Bhakt Prahlad	"Nisdin Apne Man"	Saluri Rajeshwara Rao, Rajagopal Krishnan	P. L. Santoshi	solo

== 1970s ==
=== 1971 ===
Film	Song	Composer(s)	Writer(s)	Co-artist(s)
Bagavat	"Naach Lo Jhoom Lo"	T. V. Raju	Prem Dhawan	Asha Bhosle
Jai Jawan Jai Kisaan	"Nakhrewali Chal"	A. A. Raj	Qamar Saeed	P. B. Sreenivas

=== 1973 ===
Film	Song	Composer(s)	Writer(s)	Co-artist(s)
Aashiq CID	"Itna Maanana Tu"	K. V. Mahadevan, M. Ranga Rao	Shrikant	Manna Dey
Johnny Mera Yaar	"Aa Jaa Sanam, Meri Bahon Mein Aa Jaa"	C. Satyam	Sajan Dehlvi	solo

=== 1974 ===
Film	Song	Composer(s)	Writer(s)	Co-artist(s)
Aakhri Nishan	"Gori Gori In Baahon Mein"	M. S. Viswanathan	Shrikant	S. P. Balasubrahmanyam
Aakhri Nishan	"Kar Doon Bahaar"	M. S. Viswanathan	Shrikant	S. P. Balasubrahmanyam
Aakhri Nishan	"Le Chalo Udankhatole"	M. S. Viswanathan	Shrikant	S. P. Balasubrahmanyam
Do Haath Sao Bandooken	"Mera Dil Loot Le"	C. Satyam	Shashi	solo
Do Haath Sao Bandooken	"Hey Hey Kaa"	C. Satyam	Shashi	solo
Sathi Anasuya	"Naachat Main"	P. Adinarayana Rao, M. Ranga Rao	Shrikant	solo
Sathi Anasuya	"O Piye Bahiyon"	P. Adinarayana Rao, M. Ranga Rao	Shrikant	P. B. Sreenivas

=== 1975 ===
Film	Song	Composer(s)	Writer(s)	Co-artist(s)
Alakh Niranjan	"Sudha Pee Le"	Satyam	B. R. Tripathi	solo

=== 1976 ===
Film	Song	Composer(s)	Writer(s)	Co-artist(s)
Dashavatar	"Vachan Pita Ka"	Saluri Rajeshwara Rao	Shrikant	Manna Dey, P. B. Sreenivas
Dashavatar	"Narayan Hai Woh Naam"	Saluri Rajeshwara Rao	Shrikant	solo
Jai Balaji	"Chanda Phire Aur Suraj Phire"	A. P. Nagarajan	Shrikant	solo
Jai Balaji	"Maati Ke Putle Ko"	A. P. Nagarajan	Shrikant	S. P. Balasubrahmanyam
Jai Balaji	"Basant Bela"	A. P. Nagarajan	Shrikant	Vani Jayram

=== 1977 ===
Film	Song	Composer(s)	Writer(s)	Co-artist(s)
Bahadur Bachche	"Aaj Kari Hai Maa Tune Daya"	C. Satyam	Prem Dhawan	S. P. Balasubrahmanyam
Veer Arjun	"Naari Roop Hai Madnaari"	T. G. Lingappa, M. Ranga Rao	B. R. Tripathi	S. P. Balasubrahmanyam, P. Jayachandran
Veer Arjun	"Sa Ni Dha Pa Ma Ga"	T. G. Lingappa, M. Ranga Rao	B. R. Tripathi	S. P. Balasubrahmanyam, P. Jayachandran
Veer Arjun	"Manas Ko Bhed Diya"	T. G. Lingappa, M. Ranga Rao	B. R. Tripathi	S. P. Balasubrahmanyam, P. Jayachandran
Veer Arjun	"Aan Mile Saajan Aan Mile"	T. G. Lingappa, M. Ranga Rao	B. R. Tripathi	P. Jayachandran

=== 1978 ===
Film	Song	Composer(s)	Writer(s)	Co-artist(s)
Anokhaa Shiv Bhakta	"Om Namah Shivaye"	C. Satyam	Prem Dhawan	Mahendra Kapoor, S.P. Balasubramaniam, Vani Jayaram
Anokhaa Shiv Bhakta	"Le Aao Chanda"	C. Satyam	Prem Dhawan	Mahendra Kapoor, S.P. Balasubramaniam, Vani Jayaram
Anokhaa Shiv Bhakta	"Uyi Uyi Aaj Naacho"	C. Satyam	Prem Dhawan	Mahendra Kapoor, S.P. Balasubramaniam, Vani Jayaram
Anokhaa Shiv Bhakta	"Aan Hai Shakti Ki"	C. Satyam	Prem Dhawan	Mahendra Kapoor, S.P. Balasubramaniam, Vani Jayaram
Anokhaa Shiv Bhakta	"Shiv Shiv Ratata Hai Kya"	C. Satyam	Prem Dhawan	Mahendra Kapoor, S.P. Balasubramaniam, Vani Jayaram
Anokhaa Shiv Bhakta	"Jag Ki Janani"	C. Satyam	Prem Dhawan	Mahendra Kapoor, S.P. Balasubramaniam, Vani Jayaram
Anokhaa Shiv Bhakta	"Hey Saare Jag Ke Pita"	C. Satyam	Prem Dhawan	Mahendra Kapoor, S.P. Balasubramaniam, Vani Jayaram
Anokhaa Shiv Bhakta	"Shiv Shiv Shankar Parvati"	C. Satyam	Prem Dhawan	Mahendra Kapoor, S.P. Balasubramaniam, Vani Jayaram
Anokhaa Shiv Bhakta	"Deva Hey Deva"	C. Satyam	Prem Dhawan	Mahendra Kapoor, S.P. Balasubramaniam, Vani Jayaram
Anokhaa Shiv Bhakta	"Chale Na Jor Re Kyun Pukaar"	C. Satyam	Prem Dhawan	Mahendra Kapoor, S.P. Balasubramaniam, Vani Jayaram

== 1980s ==
=== 1980 ===
Film	Song	Composer(s)	Writer(s)	Co-artist(s)
Karmveer	"Navjyoti Ho Nainon Ki"	K. Chakravarthy	Sameer (III)	solo

=== 1981 ===
Film	Song	Composer(s)	Writer(s)	Co-artist(s)
Nandu	"Hum Hain Akele"	Ilaiyaraaja	P. B. Srinivas	solo
Nandu	"Kaise Kahoon Kuchh Keh Na Sakoon"	Ilaiyaraaja	P. B. Srinivas	Bhupinder Singh
Do Dil Deewane	"Dilbar Aa"	Ilaiyaraaja	Prem Dhawan	S. P. Balasubrahmanyam
Do Dil Deewane	"Aaj Khoye Se Hi Kyun Tum"	Ilaiyaraaja	Prem Dhawan	solo
Do Dil Deewane	"Hai Pyar Ka Sangam"	Ilaiyaraaja	Prem Dhawan	solo
Do Dil Deewane	"Kitne Rangeen Hain"	Ilaiyaraaja	Prem Dhawan	solo
Do Dil Deewane	"Yeh Jahaan Tum Dekho"	Ilaiyaraaja	Prem Dhawan	solo

=== 1982 ===
Film	Song	Composer(s)	Writer(s)	Co-artist(s)
Bhakta Siriaalaa	"Atithi Seva"	T. G. Lingappa	P. B. Sreenivas, B. R. Tripathi	Bhupinder Singh
Bhakta Siriaalaa	"Man Ki Mamta"	T. G. Lingappa	P. B. Sreenivas, B. R. Tripathi	Bhupinder Singh
Bhakta Siriaalaa	"Tu Hai Kahan"	T. G. Lingappa	P. B. Sreenivas, B. R. Tripathi	solo
Dil Ka Sathi Dil	"Mere Prem Ki Gaaye"	Salil Chowdhury	Madhukar Rajasthani	K. J. Yesudas
Dil Ka Sathi Dil	"Aye Mere Dil Ga"	Salil Chowdhury	Madhukar Rajasthani	solo
Dil Ka Sathi Dil	"Chhalke Saanjh Ke Naina"	Salil Chowdhury	Madhukar Rajasthani	solo

=== 1983 ===
Film	Song	Composer(s)	Writer(s)	Co-artist(s)
Jeet Hamaari	"Aapne Mujh Mein Kya Dekha"	Bappi Lahiri	Indeevar	K. J. Yesudas, S. P. Balasubrahmanyam

=== 1984 ===
Film	Song	Composer(s)	Writer(s)	Co-artist(s)
Akalmand	"I Love You"	Laxmikant–Pyarelal	Anand Bakshi	Kishore Kumar
John Jani Janardhan	"Chat Mangni"	Laxmikant–Pyarelal	Anand Bakshi	S. P. Balasubrahmanyam
John Jani Janardhan	"Laundiya Satrah Saal"	Laxmikant–Pyarelal	Anand Bakshi	S. P. Balasubrahmanyam
John Jani Janardhan	"Swamiji O Swamiji"	Laxmikant–Pyarelal	Anand Bakshi	Shailendra Singh
John Jani Janardhan	"Ae Naujawan"	Laxmikant–Pyarelal	Anand Bakshi	Shailendra Singh
Maqsad	"Haay Haay Haay Garmi Hai"	Bappi Lahiri	Indeevar	Kishore Kumar
Tarkeeb	"Dil Mera"	Bappi Lahiri	Anjaan	Amit Kumar

=== 1985 ===
Film	Song	Composer(s)	Writer(s)	Co-artist(s)
Aandhi-Toofan	"Piya Bina Jal Rahi Hai"	Bappi Lahiri	Anjaan	Kishore Kumar
Baadal	"Toota Na Dil Ka Vaada"	Bappi Lahiri	Anjaan	S. P. Balasubrahmanyam
Balidaan	"Ui Maan Ui Ui"	Bappi Lahiri	Farooq Kaiser	solo
Fauladi Mukka	"Aa Salma Bas Mein Nahin Hai Mora Jiya"	Ilaiyaraaja	Madhukar Rajasthani	solo
Fauladi Mukka	"Badra Se Barse Hai Paani"	Ilaiyaraaja	Madhukar Rajasthani	S. P. Balasubrahmanyam
Fauladi Mukka	"Matki Leke Chali"	Ilaiyaraaja	Madhukar Rajasthani	S. P. Balasubrahmanyam
Haqeeqat	"Suno Suno Meri Pehli Pehli"	Bappi Lahiri	Indeevar	solo
Jaan Ki Baazi	"Aate Aate Teri Yaad"	Anu Malik	Anjaan	Mohammed Aziz
Jaan Ki Baazi	"Aate Aate Teri Yaad"(Sad)	Anu Malik	Anjaan	solo
Jaan Ki Baazi	"Baba Main To"	Anu Malik	Anjaan	Amit Kumar
Jhoothi	"Aaya Jab Se Tu Dil Mein"	Bappi Lahiri	Maya Govind	soll
Lover Boy	"Dhoka Hui Gawa"]	Bappi Lahiri	S. H. Bihari	Bappi Lahiri
Maa Kasam	"Jabse Tujhko Dekha Hai"	Bappi Lahiri	Farooq Kaiser	Manhar Udhas
Mard	"Sun Rubia Tumse Pyar Ho Gaya"	Anu Malik	Prayag Raj	Shabbir Kumar, Sharon Prabhakar, Amitabh Bachchan, Anu Malik
Masterji	"Gaalon Par Yeh"	Bappi Lahiri	Indeevar	Kishore Kumar
Meri Jung	"Bol Baby Bol, Rock and Roll"	Laxmikant–Pyarelal	Anand Bakshi	Kishore Kumar, Javed Jaffrey
Pataal Bhairavi	"Ek Dupatta Do Do Mawaali"	Bappi Lahiri	Indeevar	solo
Saaheb	"Jawan Hai Dil"	Bappi Lahiri	Anjaan	solo
Saaheb	"Yaar Bina Chain Kahan Re"	Bappi Lahiri	Anjaan	Bappi Lahiri
Saamri	"Paani Mein Aag Lagi"	Bappi Lahiri	Farooq Kaiser	Amit Kumar
Salma	"Hasino Ka Dastoor"	Bappi Lahiri	Hasan Kamal	solo
Sur Sangam	"Prabhu More Avagun"	Laxmikant–Pyarelal	Vasant Dev	solo
Sur Sangam	"Aayo Prabhat"	Laxmikant–Pyarelal	Vasant Dev	Rajan Mishra, Sajan Mishra
Wafadaar	"Ghode Pe Chadna"	Bappi Lahiri	Indeevar	Bappi Lahiri

=== 1986 ===
Film	Song	Composer(s)	Writer(s)	Co-artist(s)
Aakhree Raasta	"Gori Ka Saajan"	Laxmikant–Pyarelal	Anand Bakshi	Mohammed Aziz
Aakhree Raasta	"Pehle Padhai"	Laxmikant–Pyarelal	Anand Bakshi	Mohammed Aziz
Aakhree Raasta	"Tune Mera Doodh Piya" (version 1)	Laxmikant–Pyarelal	Anand Bakshi	Mohammed Aziz
Aakhree Raasta	"Tune Mera Doodh Piya" (version 2)	Laxmikant–Pyarelal	Anand Bakshi	Mohammed Aziz
Dharm Adhikari	"Ankhen Do"	Bappi Lahiri	Indeevar	Kishore Kumar
Dharm Adhikari	"Mamla Gadbad Hai"	Bappi Lahiri	Indeevar	Kishore Kumar
Dilwaala	"Abbai Abbai Ammai Ammai"	Bappi Lahiri	Indeevar	Bappi Lahiri
Dosti Dushmani	"Ithlaye Kamar Band"	Laxmikant–Pyarelal	Anand Bakshi	S. P. Balasubrahmanyam
Ilzaam	"Da Da Dadai Dadai Pyar Ho Gaya"	Bappi Lahiri	Anjaan	solo
Insaaf Ki Awaaz	"Love In The Rain"	Bappi Lahiri	Indeevar	Bappi Lahiri
Insaaf Ki Awaaz	"Radhe Pyar De"	Bappi Lahiri	Indeevar	Kishore Kumar
Insaaf Ki Awaaz	"Pyar Pyar"	Bappi Lahiri	Indeevar	Mohammed Aziz
Kala Dhanda Goray Log	"Ye Dastoor Hai"	Laxmikant–Pyarelal	Anand Bakshi	solo
Mera Dharam	"Hum To Tere Liye"	Bappi Lahiri	Hasan Kamal	Manhar Udhas
Naache Mayuri	"Pag Paadam Sangeet Geet Sargam"	Laxmikant–Pyarelal	Anand Bakshi	solo
Shart	"Tera Mera Pehla Yaarana"	Bappi Lahiri	Kaifi Azmi	Bappi Lahiri, Shailendra Singh
Shart	"Albela Albela"	Bappi Lahiri	Amit Khanna	solo
Suhaagan	"Tu Ladka Garam Masala"	Bappi Lahiri	Indeevar	Kishore Kumar
Swati	"Hindi Boli Urdu Boli"	Laxmikant–Pyarelal	Anand Bakshi	S. P. Balasubrahmanyam

=== 1987 ===
Film	Song	Composer(s)	Writer(s)	Co-artist(s)
Hifazat	"Bataata Vada"	R. D. Burman	Anand Bakshi	S. P. Balasubrahmanyam
Mard Ki Zabaan	"Lo Aa Gaya Hero"	Laxmikant–Pyarelal	S. H. Bihari	Kishore Kumar
Pratighaat	"Likhoongi Mahabharat Naya"	Ravindra Jain	Ravindra Jain	solo
Pratighaat	"Tere Sar Pe Mere"	Ravindra Jain	Ravindra Jain	S. P. Balasubrahmanyam
Pyar Ke Kabil	"Tere Jaisa Mukhda"(Female)	Bappi Lahiri	Indeevar	solo
Pyar Ke Kabil	"Bachche To Bhagwaan"	Bappi Lahiri	Indeevar	solo
Sadak Chhap	"Saahebaan Mera Naam"	Bappi Lahiri	Anjaan	Bappi Lahiri
Satyamev Jayate	"Dil Mein Ho Tum"(Female)	Bappi Lahiri	Farooq Kaiser	solo

=== 1988 ===
Film	Song	Composer(s)	Writer(s)	Co-artist(s)
Gunahon Ka Faisla	"O Mere Jogi"	Bappi Lahiri	Anjaan	solo
Main Tere Liye	"Main Tere Liye"	Bappi Lahiri	Vijay Annad	Amit Kumar
Paap Ki Duniya	"Main Tera Tota, Tu Mere Maina"	Bappi Lahiri	Anjaan	Kishore Kumar
Tamacha	"Lag Ja Gale"	Bappi Lahiri	Anand Bakshi	Mohammed Aziz
Woh Phir Aayegi	"Kya Tan Kya Man"	Anand–Milind	Sameer	Amit Kumar

=== 1989 ===
Film	Song	Composer(s)	Writer(s)	Co-artist(s)
Aag Ka Gola	"Sharab Cheez Hai Buri"	Bappi Lahiri	Anjaan	solo
Garibon Ka Daata	"Ek Ladki Kal Mili"	Bappi Lahiri	Anand Bakshi	Mohammed Aziz
Guru	"Ghayal Ghayal"	Bappi Lahiri	Indeevar	Bappi Lahiri
Kahan Hai Kanoon	"Love Me Love Me"	Bappi Lahiri	Shaily Shailendra	solo
Kasam Vardi Ki	"Jab Tak Dil Dhadkega"	Bappi Lahiri	Anjaan	Amit Kumar
Kasam Vardi Ki	"Jab Tak Dil Dhadkega"(Sad)	Bappi Lahiri	Anjaan	solo
Mahaadev	"Aaj Babua Bhaaye Kotwaal"	Ilaiyaraaja	Farooq Kaiser	Mohammed Aziz
Mahaadev	"Chand Hai Tu"	Ilaiyaraaja	Farooq Kaiser	Mohammed Aziz
Mohabat Ka Paigham	"Nache More Man Mandir"	Bappi Lahiri	Anjaan	Anup Jalota
Na-Insaafi	"Ham Beqarar Hain"	Bappi Lahiri	Anjaan	Amit Kumar
Rakhwala	"Oh My Love"	Anand–Milind	Sameer	Amit Kumar
Sachche Ka Bol-Bala	"Dekh Lenge Jaan Lenge"	Bappi Lahiri	Amit Khanna	solo
Touhean	"Saajan Saajan"	Bappi Lahiri	Anjaan	Mohammed Aziz

== 1990s ==
=== 1990 ===
Film	Song	Composer(s)	Writer(s)	Co-artist(s)
Awwal Number	"Laakhon Main"	Bappi Lahiri	Amit Khanna	Bappi Lahiri, Udit Narayan
Awwal Number	"Poocho Na Kaisa Maza"	Bappi Lahiri	Amit Khanna	Amit Kumar
Ghayal	"Pyar Tum Mujhse Karti Ho"	Bappi Lahiri	Anjaan	Amit Kumar
Ghayal	"Pyasi Jawani Hai"	Bappi Lahiri	Anjaan	solo
Izzat Aabroo	"Shole Si Bhadke"	Ajay Swamy	Vishweshwar Sharma	solo
Izzat Aabroo	"Tum Mere Dil Ki Pyaas Ko"	Ajay Swamy	Qaiser-Ul-Jafri	solo
Jamai Raja	"Tere Pyar Mein Hum"	Laxmikant–Pyarelal	Javed Akhtar	S. P. Balasubrahmanyam
Jamai Raja	"Teri Pyari Pyari"	Laxmikant–Pyarelal	Javed Akhtar	S. P. Balasubrahmanyam
Kali Ganga	"O Maa Devi Maa"	Bappi Lahiri	Anjaan	solo
Pathar Ke Insan	"Baandh Lo Ghungroo"	Bappi Lahiri	Indeevar	Amit Kumar
Shera Shamshera	"Daalo Na Mujphe"	Bappi Lahiri	Anjaan	solo
Shiva	"Botany Chodenge"	Ilaiyaraaja	Majrooh Sultanpuri	Suresh Wadkar, Udit Narayan
Shiva	"Mere Qadar Jani"	Ilaiyaraaja	Majrooh Sultanpuri	Suresh Wadkar

=== 1991 ===
Film	Song	Composer(s)	Writer(s)	Co-artist(s)
Inspector Dhanush	"Laila Laila"	Bappi Lahiri	Indeevar	solo
Inspector Dhanush	"Mere Suhag Tu"	Bappi Lahiri	Indeevar	solo
Inspector Dhanush	"Aankhon Ka Noor Tu"	Bappi Lahiri	Indeevar	S. P. Balasubrahmanyam
Inspector Dhanush	"Mausam Garam Garam"	Bappi Lahiri	Indeevar	S. P. Balasubrahmanyam
Inspector Dhanush	"Mere Bhi Man Mein Halchal"	Bappi Lahiri	Indeevar	S. P. Balasubrahmanyam
Kohraam	"Chaaku Chhori Phenko Raja PyarKar Lo"	Bappi Lahiri	Anjaan	S. Janaki, Shabbir Kumar, Vijay Benedict
Kohraam	"Lachko Jhatko Laga"	Bappi Lahiri	Indeevar	S. Janaki, Mohammad Aziz, Shailendra Singh
State Rowdy	"Rani Rani"	Bappi Lahiri	Brij Bihari	S. P. Balasubrahmanyam
State Rowdy	"Tere Liye Hai Yeh Jaan"	Bappi Lahiri	Brij Bihari	S. P. Balasubrahmanyam

=== 1992 ===
Film	Song	Composer(s)	Writer(s)	Co-artist(s)
Mangni	"Kahan Se Sanam"	O. P. Nayyar	Qamar Jalalabadi	solo
Mangni	"Jab Se Tujhe Dekha"	O. P. Nayyar	Qamar Jalalabadi	solo
Mangni	"Hum Kaise Bataye"	O. P. Nayyar	Qamar Jalalabadi	solo
Mangni	"Main To Mar Ke Bhi"(Female)	O. P. Nayyar	Qamar Jalalabadi	solo
Mangni	"Atma Marti Na"	O. P. Nayyar	Qamar Jalalabadi	S. P. Balasubrahmanyam
Mangni	"Dil De Diya"	O. P. Nayyar	Qamar Jalalabadi	S. P. Balasubrahmanyam

=== 1994 ===
Film	Song	Composer(s)	Writer(s)	Co-artist(s)
Bhairav Dweep	"Rakhiyo Ambe Maa"	Madhavapeddi Suresh	P. K. Mishra	solo
Deewana Sanam	"Kunjam Kunjam Pyar Ki"	Nikhil–Vinay, Miland Sagar	Shantaram Nandgaonkar	S. P. Balasubrahmanyam

=== 1995 ===
Film	Song	Composer(s)	Writer(s)	Co-artist(s)
Aaj Ka Romeo	"Kab Se Kab Se"	Deva	P. K. Mishra	solo
Humse Hai Muqabala	"Gopala Gopala"	A. R. Rahman	P. K. Mishra	S. P. Balasubrahmanyam

=== 1996 ===
Film	Song	Composer(s)	Writer(s)	Co-artist(s)
Khel Khiladi Ka	"Chumma De"	A. R. Rahman	Mehboob	S. P. Balasubrahmanyam
