= C. S. Dubey =

Indian actor (1924–1993)

Chandrashekhar Dubey (4 September 1924 – 28 September 1993) commonly referred to as C. S. Dubey was an Indian actor and radio personality. He was born in Kannod and appeared in over 150 Hindi films as a character actor starting in 1950s, with Patita (1953) and Mr. & Mrs. '55 (1955). He became famous for his one-liner "Dhakkan khol ke" in the film, Zinda Dil (1975), which he later used in his radio programs, as a suffix with almost every sentence.

== Life ==
Dubey was active in the Quit India movement for which he was imprisoned. He then moved to Bombay to work as an actor. He was also known as a social worker who helped poor students pay for their education.

== Career ==
He first worked for producer and director Amiya Chakravarty as an office boy, production manager and assistant director before appearing in his two films Patita and Seema (1955). He went on to appear in almost 200 films, for example Teesri Kasam, Roti Kapda Aur Makaan, Mausam, Angoor and Ram Teri Ganga Maili. He was known for mostly portraying negative characters, such as money lenders, pimps or rapists.

He worked for the radio and starred in radio programmes like Hawa Mahal, Fauji Bhaiyon and radio plays.

== Filmography ==
Year	Film	Role	Notes
1949	Sunehre Din		Cameo appearance in the song "Hum Mast Dilon Ko Lekar"
1952	Daag	Hira	
1953	Patita	Bhiku Chacha	
1955	Seema	Banke Lal	
1955	Pehli Jhalak	Paan Shop Owner	
1955	Mr. & Mrs. '55	Doctor	
1956	Jaldeep		
1957	Dekh Kabira Roya		
1957	Bhabhi	Abdul Majid's Son	
1957	Ab Dilli Dur Nahin	Ram Bharose	
1957	Kath Putli		
1958	Haria		
1959	Ardhangini	Babloo's dad	
1961	Hamari Yaad Aayegi		
1961	Passport	Dubey - Employee at Bhagwandas Jewellers	
1961	Ramu Dada		
1962	Aarti		
1963	Bidesiya		
1963	Bin Badal Barsaat		
1964	Goswami Tulsidas	Man who doubts Tulsidas	
1966	Teesri Kasam	Birju	
1966	Gaban	Bhagat - Paanwala	
1966	Aaye Din Bahar Ke		
1968	Jhuk Gaya Aasmaan	Bengali Babu	
1968	Sapnon Ka Saudagar	Ramu (gambler)	
1969	Do Bhai		
1969	Jeene Ki Raah	Raghunandan's dad	
1969	Prince	Dancer who got tied up	
1969	Aradhana	The Inn keeper	
1970	Samaj Ko Badal Dalo	Kalicharan	
1970	Pagla Kahin Ka	Pinto	
1970	Pehchan	Sunder	
1970	Humjoli	Shyama's Uncle	
1970	Yaadgaar	Chand Seth	
1970	Tum Haseen Main Jawan	Zorawar Singh	
1970	Khilona		
1971	Lagan	Kalpana's dad	
1971	Main Sunder Hoon	Chicken Owner	
1971	Bikhare Moti		
1972	Ek Khiladi Bawan Pattey		
1972	Raja Jani	Bagla Seth's Servant	
1972	Samadhi	Jr Artist	
1972	Rakhi Aur Hathkadi	Pandit	
1972	Shaadi Ke Baad	Advocate Govind	
1972	Babul Ki Galiyaan		
1972	Apna Desh		
1972	Sanjog	Dubey	Guest Appearance
1972	Piya Ka Ghar	Pandit	
1973	Mere Gharib Nawaz	Akhtar Miyan	
1973	Saudagar		
1973	Banarasi Babu	Fernandes	
1974	The Cheat		
1974	Roti Kapada Aur Makaan	Lala (grocer)	
1974	Imtihan	Professor Brij Bhushan Chaturvedi	
1975	Ek Gaon Ki Kahani	Banvarilal	
1975	Zinda Dil		
1975	Sanyasi	Munimji	
1975	Mausam	Dinu	
1975	Aandhi	Gurusaran	
1976	Lagaam		
1976	Tapasya		
1976	Chitchor	Postman	
1976	Dus Numbri		
1976	Chhoti Si Baat	Gurnaam (Garage owner)	
1977	Shirdi Ke Sai Baba	Groom's dad	
1977	Ananda Ashram	Mukhiya	
1977	Tinku	Balloon Seller	
1977	Dream Girl		
1977	Khel Khilari Ka	Nandan	
1977	Immaan Dharam	Lawyer	
1978	Tyaag Patra		
1978	Chor Ho To Aisa	Pure Hindi speaking donor	
1978	Damaad	Pandit Sunder Lal	
1978	Rahu Ketu		
1978	Ram Kasam		
1978	Ghar	Banwari Lal	
1978	Kaala Aadmi		
1978	Chakravyuha	Ayurvedic Medicine Seller	
1978	Main Tulsi Tere Aangan Ki	Subramaniam (Accountant)	
1978	Azaad	Mr. Mishra	
1979	Nagin Aur Suhagan	Thakur Zoravar Singh	
1979	Meri Biwi Ki Shaadi	Banwari	
1979	Salaam Memsaab	Panditji	
1979	Naiyya	Vaid Makardhwaj	
1979	Ghar Ki Laaj	Manphool's Uncle	
1979	Saanch Ko Aanch Nahin	Ganeshi	
1979	Manzil	Dharam Chand	
1979	Bin Phere Hum Tere	Mukand Bihari	
1980	Maan Abhiman	Munim	
1980	Patita	Din Dayal Dubey	
1980	Payal Ki Jhankaar	Shivram	
1980	Bin Maa Ke Bachche	Gopal	
1980	Hum Paanch		
1980	Be-Reham	Banke Lal	
1980	Do Premee		
1981	Sheetla Mata	Teja Singh	
1981	Fiffty Fiffty	Bihari's brother	
1981	Shradhanjali	Cremation In Charge	
1981	Khuda Kasam	Pandit	
1981	Haqdaar		
1981	Rocky	Man at the courtesan's place	
1981	Krodhi	Aarti's uncle	
1981	Bulundi	College Lecturer	
1982	Teri Maang Sitaron Se Bhar Doon	Popat Lal	
1982	Dharam Kanta	Merchant weapon	
1982	Teesri Aankh	Sagar's victim	
1982	Apna Bana Lo	Drunk	
1982	Angoor	Chhedilal	
1983	Nishaan	Lala	
1983	Faraib		
1983	Hum Se Hai Zamana	Thakur's Munim	
1983	Manju	Amar Singh	
1983	Coolie	Deepa's prospective father-in-law	
1983	Painter Babu	Nekiram	
1983	Taqdeer	Munim Phoolchand	
1983	Kalka	Sevakram	
1984	Zindagi Jeene Ke Liye		
1984	Ek Naya Itihas		
1984	Yeh Desh	Minister	
1984	Grahasthi	Lala	
1984	Kanoon Kya Karega	Pakdulal Mishra	
1984	Love Marriage	Chaubey	
1984	Karishmaa	Man who got wet	
1984	Ram Ki Ganga	Madhu's patron	
1984	Gangvaa		
1984	Ek Nai Paheli	Upendranath's friend	
1984	Sharaabi	Father of prospective bride	
1984	Bhemaa	Chaubey	
1984	Maqsad	Sharma	
1984	Inquilaab	Education Minister	
1985	Piya Milan		
1985	Ek Chitthi Pyar Bhari	Bhiku	
1985	Haqeeqat		
1985	Phaansi Ke Baad	Loknath, MP	
1985	Ghar Dwaar	Karodimal	
1985	Mard	Lalaji	
1985	Ram Teri Ganga Maili	Pandit	
1986	Maa Beti	Purshotamlal	
1986	Andheri Raat Mein Diya Tere Haath Mein		
1986	Saveray Wali Gaadi	Pandit	
1986	Ghar Sansar	Money Lender	
1986	Karma		
1986	Kirayadar	Advocate Balwant B. Desai	
1986	Kala Dhanda Goray Log	Money Lender	
1986	Aap Ke Saath	Stranger #1	
1987	Sheela		
1987	Raat Ke Andhere Mein		
1987	Daku Hasina		
1987	Marte Dam Tak	Tiwarilal	
1987	Besahara		
1987	Kudrat Ka Kanoon	Ramu	
1987	Thikana	Man who raped maid	
1987	Kalyug Aur Ramayan	Jagannath	
1987	Nazrana	Parvati's Husband	
1987	Raaj Dulara		
1988	Aurat Teri Yehi Kahani	Poojari	
1988	Jeete Hain Shaan Se		
1988	Zalzala	Mukhiya	
1988	Ek Naya Rishta	Rajiv's relative	
1988	Zakhmi Aurat	Rapist's father	
1988	Soorma Bhopali		
1988	Hum Farishte Nahin		
1988	Aakrant		
1989	Ustaad		
1989	Dav Pech	Molester	
1989	Nishane Bazi		
1989	Bade Ghar Ki Beti	Lala (Money-lender)	
1989	Toofan	Bride's Father	
1989	Jaadugar	Pujari	
1989	Galiyon Ka Badshah		
1989	Clerk		
1990	Vidrohi	Deshbandhu	
1990	Karishma Kali Kaa	Parvati's Advocate	
1990	Aag Ka Gola		
1990	Ghar Ho To Aisa	Mahajan	
1990	Sailaab	Pandit	
1990	Jeevan Ek Sanghursh	Roop Chand	
1991	Narasimha	Munshi	
1991	Iraada		
1992	Naseebwaala	Man who bought the garage	
1993	Shuruaat		
1993	Dalaal	Neta's man	
1993	Dhartiputra	Secretary To Governor	
1993	Antim Nyay	Lawyer	
1994	Stunttman	Jeweller	
1994	Eena Meena Deeka	Eena's Neighbour	
1995	Sarhad: The Border of Crime		
1995	Aatank Hi Aatank	Durga Prasad Tiwari	
1997	Share Bazaar	Money lender	
1999	Gair	Mandir poojary	
2004	Hatya: The Murder	Paid Mourner	
2008	Yaar Meri Zindagi		
