= Dahleez (film) =

1986 film by Ravi Chopra

- Directed by: Ravi Chopra
- Written by: Parkash Chopra
- Screenplay by: Satish Bhatnagar; Rahi Masoom Reza
- Produced by: B. R. Chopra
- Starring: Jackie Shroff; Raj Babbar; Meenakshi Sheshadri
- Cinematography: Dharam Chopra
- Edited by: S. B. Mane
- Music by: Ravi
- Distributed by: B. R. Films
- Release date: 24 October 1986
- Country: India
- Language: Hindi

Dahleez (transl. Threshold) is a 1986 Indian Bollywood film directed by Ravi Chopra and produced by B. R. Chopra. It is based on the Hollywood film, Hanover Street. It stars Jackie Shroff, Raj Babbar and Meenakshi Sheshadri in lead roles along with Smita Patil, Aruna Irani, Zarina Wahab and Shafi Inamdar in supporting roles.

== Plot ==
Indian Army Officer Colonel Rahul Saxena marries the attractive Naini and they begin to live a fairly harmonious life. This harmony is soon disrupted when Rahul is called to the front, leaving Naini behind to continue living a lonely and isolated life. When Rahul returns from the front, he senses a change in Naini and decides to follow her when she goes out. He learns that she is having an affair with a young man named Chandrashekhar. He is devastated but doesn't say anything to Naini and arranges to return to the front and volunteers for a dangerous mission into enemy territory. And the person accompanying him is none other than Chandrashekhar. Will Rahul be focused enough to concentrate on the mission or will he be sidetracked to put an end to Chandrashekhar's life?

== Cast ==
- Jackie Shroff as Chandrashekhar
- Raj Babbar as Colonel Rahul Saxena
- Meenakshi Sheshadri as Naini Saxena
- Smita Patil as Sukhbir Kaur
- Aruna Irani as Saroj
- Shafi Inamdar as Major General Khushal Singh
- Zarina Wahab as Jameela Ali
- Vijayendra Ghatge as Ahmed Ali
- Rajesh Puri as Lallu
- Puneet Issar
- Arun Bakshi
- Dalip Tahil as Sukhdev

== Soundtrack ==
Lyrics: Hasan Kamal

Song	Singer
"Bewafa Ja, Tera Vada Dekha"	Mahendra Kapoor
"Mere Humdum, Mere Kareeb"	Mahendra Kapoor
"Ek Adhuri Si Mulaqat Hui Thi Jinse"	Mahendra Kapoor, Bhupinder Singh
"Jhoomti Baharon Ka Sama, Pyar Ki Umangen Hai Jawan"	Mahendra Kapoor, Asha Bhosle
"Tum Aaye To Humko Aaj Woh Phir Bhula Hua Qissa"	Mahendra Kapoor, Asha Bhosle
"Dil Bekaraar, Wai Wai, Tujh Pe Nisaar, Wai Wai"	Mahendra Kapoor, Asha Bhosle
