= Meenakshi Seshadri =

Indian former actress, model, and dancer (born 1963)

- Born: Shashikala Seshadri; 16 November 1963 (age 62); Sindri, Bihar, India
- Occupations: Film actress; dancer
- Years active: 1981–1999
- Title: Eve's Weekly Miss India 1981 in Japan
- Spouse: Harish Mysore (m. 1995)
- Children: 2
- Relatives: Shekhar Seshadri (brother)

Meenakshi Seshadri Mysore (pronounced [miːnaːkʂiː ʃeːʂaːdrɪ]; née Seshadri; born 16 November 1963) as Shashikala Seshadri, is an Indian former actress and beauty pageant titleholder who worked primarily in Hindi, Telugu and Tamil films. Seshadri established herself as one of the most popular and highest-paid actresses of the late 1980s and early 1990s and is considered among the leading actresses of Indian cinema.

Prior to her acting career, Seshadri won the Eve's Weekly Miss India contest in 1981 at the age of 17. She became one of Hindi cinema's leading actresses in the 1980s and 1990s, and was acknowledged for several of her performances, her beauty, and her accomplished dancing. She made her debut with the film Painter Babu (1983) produced by Manoj Kumar, and her second film Hero (1983) catapulted her to instant stardom. She was noted for her performances in films including Hero (1983), Aandhi-Toofan (1985), Meri Jung (1985), Swati (1986), Dilwaala (1986), Dacait (1987), Inaam Dus Hazaar (1987), Parivaar (1987), Shahenshah (1988), Mahaadev (1989), Awaargi (1990), Jurm (1990), Ghayal (1990), Ghar Ho To Aisa (1990), Damini (1993), Duet (1994) and Ghatak (1996). She received particular critical acclaim for Swati (1986), Dahleez (1986), Satyamev Jayate (1987), Awaargi (1990) and Damini (1993). She also performed at the Khajuraho Dance Festival in the 1990s.

After the release of her film Ghatak, she left the film industry to raise her children in the United States with her husband, where she runs the Cherish Dance School. A documentary was made about her life, titled Meenakshi Accept Her Wings.

== Early life ==
Meenakshi Seshadri was born on 16 November 1963 as Shashikala Seshadri in a Tamil speaking family in Sindri, Bihar (now in Jharkhand). She trained in four Indian classical dance forms, Bharata Natyam, Kuchipudi, Kathak, and Odissi, under Vempati Chinna Satyam and Jaya Rama Rao. She won the Eve's Weekly Miss India contest in 1981 at the age of 17 and represented India at the Miss International 1981 in Tokyo, Japan.

== Career ==
=== Debut and early success (1983–1985) ===
After a forgettable debut in Painter Babu, Meenakshi acted alongside another newcomer, Jackie Shroff, in Hero. The film was a blockbuster and Meenakshi became an overnight star. Immediately after the success of Hero, she got an offer to star with superstar Rajesh Khanna to appear in a double role in Awara Baap but the film underperformed at the box office. She then appeared in several commercial films, including Love Marriage, Paisa Ye Paisa, and Lover Boy. Her next successful film was Bewafai, with Khanna again and starring Rajinikanth as the antagonist. Then Ghai again cast her alongside Anil Kapoor in Meri Jung, which was one of the highest-grossing films of 1985. This gave her a major foothold in the industry. Swati, Mera Jawab, and Aandhi Toofan were all moderately successful. The same year she also appeared with Jeetendra in Hoshiyar and with Rajinikanth in Mahaguru (1985) as his heroine. In 1986 Meenakshi made a special appearance in a song with Rajinikanth in the Telugu movie Jeevana Poratam.

=== Established actress (1986–1989) ===
Seshadri appeared in many critically acclaimed films in 1986. In Swati, a woman-centric art house film, she performed the title role. The film gained immense critical acclaim and critics said, "Meenakshi Seshadri has acted in Swati the way Amitabh Bachchan acts in his films". That same year she appeared in B. R. Chopra films alongside Jackie Shroff and Raj Babbar in the romantic drama Dahleez, which dealt with the taboo topic of infidelity but underperformed at the box office. Her other releases that year, such as Allah Rakha, were average performers at the box office. Dilwala (1986) and Parivaar with Mithun Chakraborty did very well at box office. Main Balwan (1986) was average in India, but a superhit overseas.

In 1987, she appeared in the hit film Inaam Dus Hazaar alongside Sanjay Dutt. She also appeared in Dacait, an action drama alongside Sunny Deol to critical acclaim.

In 1988, she starred in Yash Chopra's multi-starrer Vijay. She also starred in the much hyped Shahenshah opposite Amitabh Bachchan which proved to be a huge success. Meenakshi teamed up with Bachchan for Toofan, Akayla, and Gangaa Jamunaa Saraswati, but all three were flops.

In 1988 Prakash Mehra had announced Dhan Dhahej, starring Anil Kapoor and Meenakshi, Sanjay Khan announced Sarzameen with Anil Kapoor, Meenakshi, and Vinod Khanna, Ramesh Sippy announced Aalishaan with Amitabh Bachchan and Meenakshi but none of these movies took off. Then Subhash Ghai signed Bachchan for the first time in film Devaa opposite Meenakshi Seshadri, but it was shelved after a song picturised on Bachchan and Shammi Kapoor that was sung by Mohammed Aziz.

In 1989, she was directed by Dev Anand in Sachché Ká Bol-Bálá. In 1989, she also made her Tamil film debut with En Rathathin Rathame, a remake of the Hindi film Mr. India, opposite K. Bhagyaraj, which bombed at the box office. She also appeared in Kalpataru's family dramas Bade Ghar Ki Beti and Gharana which were moderate successes.

She worked with fellow dancer Mithun Chakraborthy in Aandhi Toofan, Main Balwan, Dilwaala, Parivaar, Bees Saal Baad Pyar Ka Karz, and Shandaar. Her pairings with Sunny Deol, Jackie Shroff, Vinod Khanna and Rishi Kapoor were hugely popular and often praised by the media. Her best and most successful pairing, as well as her best on-screen chemistry was with Anil Kapoor. Her successful films with Anil Kapoor include Aag Se Khelenge, Meri Jung, Humlaa and Ghar Ho Toh Aisa, while some others like Love Marriage, Amba, Joshilaay were box office duds.

=== Commercial success (1990–1996) ===
In 1990, Meenakshi appeared in two films by Mahesh Bhatt, the first being Awaargi, an art house film. Many critics call this her best performance. The second film was Jurm, released in the same year. The film was a critical and commercial success. Her role as a wife who has to face her problems after her husband gets involved with another woman gained immense critical praise. She received her first Filmfare Award nomination for best actress for her role in the film. She also appeared in the film Ghar Ho To Aisa opposite Anil Kapoor; the film was a hit and Meenakshi was noted for her comedic timing. She then appeared in Ghayal alongside Sunny Deol. This film started her long association with Rajkumar Santoshi. Ghayal was the highest-grossing film of the 1990.

In 1991, she appeared opposite Amitabh Bachchan in Akayla, directed by Ramesh Sippy; despite being well-promoted, the film flopped at the box office. Her on-screen pairing with Vinod Khanna was widely appreciated, and the pair starred in such successful films as Satyamev Jayate, Mahaadev, Jurm, Humshakal, and Police Aur Mujrim. She acted in the successful family drama Ghar Parivar in 1991, with Rajesh Khanna and Rishi Kapoor as her co-stars. Meenakshi made her Telugu film debut with Brahmarshi Viswamitra in 1991. The same year, Raj Kumar Santoshi started the film Dil Hai Tumhara with Sunny Deol. Meenakshi paired for the first time with Salman Khan; they only shot once before the film was shelved.

In 1992, she appeared in the Telugu film Aapadbandhavudu opposite Chiranjeevi. In 1992 her film Aaj Ka Goonda Raaj opposite Chiranjeevi was a hit.

In 1993, she appeared in the film Damini – Lightning. Directed by filmmaker Rajkumar Santoshi, it also starred Rishi Kapoor, Sunny Deol, Amrish Puri, Tinnu Anand, and Paresh Rawal. The film depicted the sensitive subject of injustice towards a rape victim. She won many accolades for her performance in the film. Damini received a number of awards, including a National Film Award and a Filmfare Award nomination. Damini is regarded as Meenakshi's career-defining role and considered a cult feminist film. She performed a Tandav dance in the film, choreographed by Ravindra Atibudhi. In 1993, she also appeared in Aadmi Khilona Hai opposite Govinda; and Kshatriya opposite Vinod Khanna – both the films were successful at the box office.

In 1994, she appeared in the Tamil film Duet opposite Prabhu, directed by K. Balachander. The same year, she was in a dance show of songs from Damini: "Bin Sajan Jhula Jholu" with Aamir Khan.

Meenakshi played the female lead in the 1996 film Ghatak opposite Sunny Deol, directed by Rajkumar Santoshi. It was one of the highest-grossing films of 1996. This was her last film, as she moved to the United States after marriage.

=== Hiatus (1997–present) ===
After her marriage, she made a rare appearance on Shekhar Suman's talk show. After a few years of marriage, she shifted her base to Plano, Texas, in the United States. In an interview she stated: "Coming from a very Indo-centric background, life abroad shook me, I just could not relate to the US environment." However, with the passage of time she has settled there. Now she is running her own dance school in Carrollton called Cherish Institute of Dance; The school is described as "an assembly of talented dancers, a voluntary body to enhance multi-culture, revealing the best talent of people of all ages".

== Personal life ==
Meenakshi retired from cinema after marrying investment banker Harish Mysore in 1995. They had a civil wedding and a registered marriage in New York. The couple have two children, a daughter and a son. Meenakshi lived in Plano, Texas. There, she taught Bharatanatyam, Kathak, and Odissi. She performs with her students at charity events and fundraisers, including the American Association of Physicians of Indian Origin (AAPI) convention in California. She has shifted to Mumbai.

== Artistry and legacy ==
=== Acting and dance ===
Meenakshi Sheshadri is considered one of the great actresses of Indian cinema, After Jaya Prada and Sridevi Minakshi was most successful actress in 80s."Box Office India" described her as very beautiful and included her in eight top actress lists (1986-1993). Meenakshi is known for her proficiency in both acting and dancing.

Often referred to as "Damini," she is famous for her dance in the song "Tu Mera Hero Hai" from the film Hero. She is also known for her dance sequences to Bollywood songs, such as "Pyar Karne Wale" (from Hero), "Rock' N' Roll," "Tu Nache Main Gaoon" with Mithun (from Main Balwaan and Parivaar), "Teri Payal Mere Geet" with Govinda (from Teri Payal Mere Geet), "Jaane Do Jaane Do" (from Shahenshah) opposite Amitabh Bachchan, "Badal Pe Chalke" (from Vijay) opposite Anil Kapoor and Rishi Kapoor, "Bin Saajan Jhula" (from Damini) opposite Aamir Khan, "Sajan Mera Uss Par Hai" (from Gangaa Jamunaa Saraswati), "Mujre Wali Hoon" (from Awaargi), "Jab Koi Baat Bigad Jaye" (from Jurm), and "Badan Main Chandni" (from Ghatak).

She considers herself more of a dancer than an actress. Her desire to continue the art and extend this culture in a foreign land led her to found the Cherish Dance School.

=== Singing ===
Meenakshi sang some poetic notes in J.P. Dutta's movie Kshatriya, in a composition by Laxmikant Pyarelal. She sang a song in another movie, Tadap, with Chunky Pandey and Nana Patekar, but the movie was not released. She sang "Tumhare Roop Ka", composed by R.D. Burman, with Amit Kumar and Suresh Wadkar.

== Documentaries and television appearances ==
She has made few appearances on talk shows and rarely gives interviews. In 1987, she appeared in an interview in London, in which she discussed her personal and professional life.

In 1992, Meenakshi featured in the television documentary World of Film: India about the Indian film industry; she appeared with stalwarts such as Shashi Kapoor, Amitabh Bachchan, and Mira Nair.

In 1997, she made a rare public appearance on Shekhar Suman's talk show Movers & Shakers (TV series); this was also her last television appearance before she left the industry to raise her children. She discussed her entire career, her personal life, and her passion for dance and her stage performances.

In 2006, a documentary was made on her life called Meenakshi Accept Her Wings, directed by Margret Stephens; the two-hour musical documentary depicted her lifestyle transition from a dancer and actress to a homemaker. The movie gave a deeper insight to her life after quitting film and her successful marriage.

== Awards and recognition ==
- 1986 – Lux Award as Best Actress for Swati
- 1991 – Filmfare Nomination as Best Actress for Jurm
- 1992 – Filmfare Award South nomination as Best Actress – Telugu for Aapadbandhavudu
- 1994 – Filmfare Nomination as Best Actress for Damini
- 1993 – Smita Patil Memorial Award as Best Actress for Damini

== Filmography ==
Year	Title	Role	Language	Notes	Ref.
1983	Painter Babu	Renu	Hindi		
1983	Hero	Radha	Hindi		
1984	Love Marriage	Ritu	Hindi		
1985	Hoshiyar	Jyoti	Hindi		
1985	Mera Jawab	Poonam	Hindi		
1985	Aandhi-Toofan	Meena	Hindi		
1985	Mahaguru	Basanti	Hindi		
1985	Bewafai	Vinny	Hindi		
1985	Maha Shaktimaan	Madhuri	Hindi		
1985	Meraa Ghar Mere Bachche	Sarita	Hindi		
1985	Paisa Yeh Paisa	Sapna	Hindi		
1985	Meri Jung	Geeta	Hindi		
1985	Lover Boy	Radha	Hindi		
1985	Awara Baap	Rupa / Deepa	Hindi		
1986	Ricky	Rani	Hindi		
1986	Main Balwaan	Natasha	Hindi		
1986	Maa Beti	Meenu / Asha	Hindi		
1986	Dahleez	Naini	Hindi		
1986	Allah Rakha	Rani	Hindi		
1986	Dilwaala	Padma	Hindi		
1986	Swati	Swati	Hindi		
1986	Pahunche Huwey Log	Herself	Hindi	Special appearance	
1986	Jeevana Poratam	Herself	Telugu	Special appearance	
1987	Satyamev Jayate	Seema	Hindi		
1987	Dacait	Chavli	Hindi		
1987	Inaam Dus Hazaar	Kamal / Sonia	Hindi		
1987	Muqaddar Ka Faisla	Meena	Hindi		
1987	Parivaar	Anita	Hindi		
1988	Main Tere Liye	Rinku	Hindi		
1988	Aurat Teri Yehi Kahani	Savitri	Hindi		
1988	Gangaa Jamunaa Saraswati	Jamuna	Hindi		
1988	Inteqam	Seeta	Hindi		
1988	Vijay	Sapna	Hindi		
1988	Shahenshah	Shalu	Hindi		
1989	Sachché Ká Bol-Bálá	Reema	Hindi		
1989	Bees Saal Baad	Kiran	Hindi		
1989	Joshilaay	Mangala	Hindi		
1989	En Rathathin Rathame	Meenakshi	Tamil	Remake of Mr. India	
1989	Mahaadev	Geeta	Hindi		
1989	Bade Ghar Ki Beti	Mala	Hindi		
1989	Gharana	Radha	Hindi		
1989	Toofan	Radha	Hindi		
1989	Aag Se Khelenge	Geeta	Hindi		
1989	Mohabat Ka Paigham	Zeenat	Hindi		
1989	Nache Nagin Gali Gali	Mohini	Hindi		
1990	Awaargi	Meena	Hindi		
1990	Shandaar	Rani	Hindi		
1990	Pyar Ka Karz	Dr. Naina	Hindi		
1990	Ghar Ho To Aisa	Seema	Hindi		
1990	Ghayal	Varsha	Hindi		
1990	Jurm	Meena	Hindi	Nominated—Filmfare Award for Best Actress	
1990	Amba	Lajjo	Hindi		
1991	Ghar Parivar	Mala	Hindi		
1991	Brahmarshi Vishwamitra	Menaka	Telugu		
1991	Akayla	Seema	Hindi		
1992	Humlaa	Seema	Hindi		
1992	Aaj Ka Goonda Raj	Shalu	Hindi		
1992	Police Aur Mujrim	Kiran	Hindi		
1992	Humshakal	Sara	Hindi		
1992	Aapadbandhavudu	Hema	Telugu	Nominated—Filmfare Award for Best Actress	
1992	Yeh Raat Phir Na Aayegi	Radha	Hindi		
1993	Kshatriya	Madhu	Hindi		
1993	Damini	Damini	Hindi	Nominated—Filmfare Award for Best Actress	
1993	Aadmi Khilona Hai	Poonam	Hindi		
1993	Teri Payal Mere Geet	Laila / Leela	Hindi		
1993	Badi Bahen	Jyoti	Hindi		
1993	Sadhna	Madhu	Hindi	Special appearance	
1994	Duet	Anjali	Tamil		
1996	Ghatak: Lethal	Gauri	Hindi	Delayed release	
1997	Do Rahain	Ms. Kannagi	Hindi		
1998	Swami Vivekananda	Sannyasini	Sanskrit	Delayed release; guest appearance	
2016	Ghayal: Once Again	Varsha	Hindi	Flashback appearance	

== Documentary ==
Year	Title	Role	Notes
1992	World of Film: India	Herself	Appeared alongside Amitabh Bachchan, Shashi Kapoor and Mira Nair
2006	Meenakshi Accept Her Wings	Herself	Directed by Margret Stephens
