= Awaargi =

1990 Indian Hindi drama film by Mahesh Bhatt

- Promotional Poster
- Directed by: Mahesh Bhatt
- Written by: Suraj Sanim
- Produced by: P. Raghunath
- Starring: Anil Kapoor; Govinda; Meenakshi Sheshadri; Anupam Kher; Paresh Rawal
- Cinematography: Nadeem Khan
- Edited by: Dimpy Bahl
- Music by: Anu Malik
- Distributed by: Swaraajya Shree Movies
- Release date: 26 January 1990
- Running time: 149 minutes
- Country: India
- Language: Hindi

Awaargi is a 1990 Indian Hindi-language romantic drama film directed by Mahesh Bhatt starring Anil Kapoor, Govinda, and Meenakshi Sheshadri in lead roles. Over the years, it has gained critical praise and is considered a classic now. Anil Kapoor and Meenakshi received critical acclaim for their roles.

== Plot ==
Lala Jamal Khan is one of Bombay's underground dons and has several men who carry out all kinds of criminal activities on his behalf. One of these men is Azaad, whom Khan uses to scare people, and who has never failed him. Then Azaad rescues a prostitute named Meena from Ranu Bhai, who owes allegiance to a rival gangster called Bhau, thereby inviting his wrath. Azaad refuses to submit to anyone and helps Meena achieve her goal of becoming a famous singer. He entrusts her to a music director named Dhirendra and watches as she becomes more popular every day. Azaad has fallen in love with Meena, but he is unable to tell her. What Azaad does not know is that Dhirendra has also fallen in love with Meena, and it seems that she is attracted to him too. However, before he can pursue this any further, Azaad must contend with Bhau's hoodlums, who have been instructed to kill him at all costs.

== Cast ==
- Anil Kapoor as Azaad.
- Govinda as Dheerendra Kumar "Dheeren"
- Meenakshi Sheshadri as Meena
- Anupam Kher as Lala Jamal Khan
- Paresh Rawal as Bhau
- Satish Kaushik as Azaad's Friend
- Avtar Gill as Ranu Bhai
- Ghulam Ali as himself (Special appearance)

== Music ==
Anu Malik composed the film's music and Anand Bakshi penned the lyrics.

Song	Singer
"Chamakte Chand Ko"	Ghulam Ali
"Bali Umar Ne Mera Haal Woh Kiya"	Lata Mangeshkar, Mohammed Aziz
"Ae Mere Sathiya, Tu Koi Geet Ga"	Lata Mangeshkar, Mohammed Aziz
"Mujrewali Hoon Main"	Anuradha Paudwal
"Dak Babu Aaya"	Asha Bhosle
