= Akayla =

- Release poster
- Directed by: Ramesh Sippy
- Written by: Salim Khan
- Produced by: Mushir - Riaz
- Starring: Amitabh Bachchan; Jackie Shroff; Meenakshi Seshadri; Aditya Pancholi; Kiran Juneja; Keith Stevenson; Shashi Kapoor; Amrita Singh
- Cinematography: K. K. Mahajan
- Edited by: M. S. Shinde
- Music by: Laxmikant–Pyarelal
- Distributed by: M.R. Productions
- Release date: 8 November 1991
- Running time: 170 minutes
- Country: India
- Language: Hindi

Akayla (transl. Alone) is a 1991 Hindi-language action thriller film directed by Ramesh Sippy and produced by the Mushir - Riaz duo. It featured an ensemble cast of Amitabh Bachchan, Jackie Shroff, Amrita Singh, Meenakshi Sheshadri, Aditya Pancholi, Kiran Juneja, Keith Stevenson (in his debut), and Shashi Kapoor in an extended special appearance. It was loosely based on Dirty Harry (1971).

Akayla released worldwide on 8 November 1991. Upon release, the film received mixed reviews from critics, with praise for Bachchan and Singh's performances, but criticism for the predictable plot and Stevenson's performance. Commercially, the film was a moderate success and the 7th highest-grossing Hindi-language film of 1991.

== Plot ==
CID Inspector Vijay Verma is a lonely cop. His only family is a younger brother Ajay Verma, who is studying abroad. He also has two good friends Shekhar and Seema. Vijay sacrifices his love interest Seema for his friend Shekhar, unaware that Seema too was interested in him. One day when he arrests the criminal mastermind Tony Briganza, he is shocked when Tony is released from police custody because his corrupt lawyer shows the court a videotape showing him at a completely different place, which suggests he couldn't have committed the crime. From that day on, they become enemies and Vijay is hot on Tony's trail every time he commits a crime. Vijay eventually meets nightclub dancer Sapna, and the two eventually become very close to each other.

While watching Seeta Aur Geeta with Sapna, he realises that two people can be at different places at the same time if they are twins. He realises that Tony has a mentally handicapped twin brother called Jojo, who covers for him each time he commits a crime so he can get away with it easily. He successfully gets Tony arrested and put in prison. However, Tony escapes and hides out at the house of Shekhar and Seema. When Shekhar realises that Tony and Jojo are wanted criminals, he tries to contact Vijay but Tony and Jojo find out and kill Shekhar and Seema. Vijay is devastated by the loss of his two best friends and is comforted by Sapna, whom he falls in love with. They both eventually some time later confess their love for each other and plan to marry soon. After the death of his friends, he kills Jojo as revenge for his friends and sets his sights on Tony. Tony is outraged by the death of his brother and now has his brother Ajay and his newly-wed wife on his hit list, he eventually tracks them down and kills them. Tony targets Sapna next and tries to kill her but Vijay saves her just in time and thus begins a Cat and Mouse game between Vijay and Tony. Vijay now bitter that all his loved ones are dead targets and aims to kill Tony once and for all but the police commissioner warns him not to take the law into his hands. Vijay however cannot bear anymore deaths and punishment being handed out by Tony and resigns from police duty as he no longer wants to arrest Tony, his aim is to put an end to his criminal activities and kill him for good. Vijay tracks down Tony and even though he changes his mind and wants to hand him over to the police but Tony ridicules him and after seeing that Tony can never change he finally kills him. The Police Commissioner arrives and despite knowing that it is wrong to take the law in to your own hands, sympathizes with Vijay and welcomes him back to the police force.

== Cast ==
- Amitabh Bachchan as Inspector Vijay Verma
- Jackie Shroff as Shekhar
- Meenakshi Seshadri as Seema
- Amrita Singh as Sapna
- Shashi Kapoor as Police Commissioner Ravi Kalra
- Helen as Monica
- Aditya Pancholi as Ajay Verma
- Kiran Juneja as Neetu
- Kanwaljit Singh as Inspector Ahmed
- Keith Stevenson as Tony/Jojo
- Vikram Gokhale as Doctor Verma
- Mangal Dhillon as Lawyer Vivek
- S M Zaheer as Judge Bhosle
- Lalit Mohan Tiwari as Charan
- Mahesh Anand as Ranjeet
- Ajay Wadhavkar as Janardhan
- Biswajit Chatterjee

== Soundtrack ==
No.	Title	Singer(s)	Length
1.	"Kehti Hai Duniya"	Alka Yagnik
2.	"Mujhe Aaj Kuch Na Kehna"	Sudesh Bhosle, Alka Yagnik
3.	"Chal Chal Ri Chal"	Sudesh Bhosle
4.	"Aag Lag Jaaye""	Mohammad Aziz, Manhar Udhas, Alka Yagnik
5.	"Jeene Walon"	Sudesh Bhosle
