= Mahesh Anand =

Indian actor (1961–2019)

- Born: 13 August 1961; India
- Died: 9 February 2019 (aged 57); Mumbai, Maharashtra, India
- Other names: Meeshi; Mashy Anand
- Occupations: Actor; dancer; martial artist
- Years active: 1982–2019
- Spouse(s): Barkha Roy (divorced) Erica D'Souza (m. 1987, divorced) Madhu Malhotra (m. 1992, divorced) Usha Bachani (m. 2000; div. 2002) Lana (m. 2015)
- Children: Trishul Anand (son) (born 1989)

Mahesh Anand (13 August 1961 – 9 February 2019) was an Indian actor, dancer and martial artist who primarily worked in Hindi and Telugu films. He is remembered for playing villainous roles in Hindi films. He was a black belt in Karate and was a model and a trained dancer before he started acting. His debut movie was Karishmaa 1984 while his last on-screen appearance was in the 2019 comedy-drama film Rangeela Raja. Before acting in Karishmaa he performed for the opening sequence of Sanam Teri Kasam 1982 with his dance in silhouette.

== Filmography ==
=== Hindi ===
Year	Film	Role	Notes
1982	Sanam Teri Kasam	Title dancer	
1984	Karishmaa	Dev	
1985	Bhavani Junction	Kundan	
1986	Sasti Dulhan Mahenga Dulha	Shankar (Leading Role)	
1987	Insaaf	Michael Fernandes	
1988	Shahenshah	Local goon	
1988	Sone Pe Suhaaga	Robert	
1988	Gangaa Jamunaa Saraswati	Shakta	
1988	Kabzaa		
1989	Hathyar	Afzal	
1989	Ilaaka	Sami's son	
1989	Mahaadev		
1989	Sikka	George	
1989	Mujrim	Raja	
1989	Toofan	Daku Zaalim Singh	
1989	Shehzaade	Thakur	
1989	Aag Ka Gola	Mahesh	
1990	Pathar Ke Insan		
1990	Khatarnaak	Mahesh	
1990	Majboor	Sangraam	
1990	Ghar Ho To Aisa	Roadside Rowdy Goon	
1990	Swarg	Guru	
1990	Jungle Love	Dr. Pinto	
1990	Jurm	Durjan	
1990	Thanedaar	Mangal	
1991	Khilaaf	Kunwer Bhanupratap Chauhan	
1991	Pratikar	Naagraj	
1991	Kohraam	Laaloo Ustad	
1991	Trinetra	Franco	
1991	Indrajeet	Mahesh Sadachari	
1991	Kasam Kali Ki	Thakur S.P. Singh	
1991	Akayla	Ranjeet	
1991	Dancer	Brij Bhushan's henchman	
1992	Lambu Dada	Bhushan	
1992	Muskurahat	K. C.	
1992	Nishchaiy	Joseph Lobo	
1992	Zulm Ki Hukumat		
1992	Vishwatma	Rajnath	
1993	Waqt Hamara Hai	Major in Col Chikara Gang	
1993	Hum Hain Kamaal Ke	Danny	
1993	Kundan	Pinto	
1993	Gumrah	Tiger (Opposition fighter in the Ring at Hong Kong)	
1993	Game	Afzal Khan	
1993	Sir	Jimmy's henchman	
1993	Tahqiqaat	Vikram	
1994	Pathreela Raasta	Munna	
1994	Khuddar	Babujaan	
1994	Andaz	Chotey	
1994	Krantiveer	Vaisiram	
1994	Betaaj Badshah	Rama Swamy	
1995	Coolie No. 1	Gajendra's son	
1995	Jawab	Leader of Bank Robbers	
1996	Muqadama	Balbira	
1996	Vishwasghaat	Babu Seth	
1996	Vijeta	George	
1996	Zordaar	Jackal	
1996	Hum Hain Premi		
1996	Shohrat		
1997	Lahu Ke Do Rang	Tinnu Shikari	
1998	Zulm-O-Sitam	Banjara	
1999	Aaya Toofan	Colonel Gaddafi	
1999	Lal Baadshah	Narayan Singh	
2000	Baaghi	Chhottey	
2000	Kurukshetra	Anna Pillai	
2003	Ek Aur Ek Gyarah	Captain Mahesh	
2005	Ssukh	Advocate Khalil Sheikh	
2019	Rangeela Raja		

=== Telugu ===
Year	Film	Role	Notes
1989	Lankeswarudu	Mahesh	
1991	Ramudu Kadhu Rakshasudu	Mahesh	
1994	S. P. Parasuram	Kapali	
1994	Number One		
1994	Top Hero	Jala Rakshasudu	
1994	Bobbili Simham	Rowdy	
1994	Yes Nenante Nene	Billa	
1995	Alluda Majaka		
1995	Super Mogudu	Santhamurthy	
1995	Gharana Bullodu	Bhagvan	
1995	Telugu Veera Levara	Tiger	
1996	Jagadeka Veerudu	Durjaya	
1996	Sampradayam	Bangaru Raju	
1996	Puttinti Gowravam	Anand	
1998	Auto Driver	Surya	
2005	Balu	Das Anna	

=== Malayalam ===
Year	Film	Role	Notes
1991	Abhimanyu	Amar Bakhia	
1992	Oottyppattanam	Dharmaraj	
1999	The Godman	John Britto	
2001	Praja	Raman Naik	

=== Tamil ===
Year	Film	Role	Notes
1994	Veera	Harichandra	
1994	Periya Marudhu	Sivasankaran	
1996	Sivasakthi	Marc Zuber Anthony	

=== Kannada ===
Year	Film	Role	Notes
1997	Cheluva	Raghuram	

== Death ==
On 9 February 2019, his maid failed to get any response from him after ringing the bell of his residence many times. She then immediately informed his sister who came there with Versova Police. Anand was found dead, sitting on a sofa with a bottle of alcohol. A plate with food was found lying on a table beside him. After investigation, it was found that he had died 3 days ago. Apparently, his dead body had gone unnoticed for 3 days. He had died alone and in loneliness.
