= Bade Ghar Ki Beti =

- Directed by: Kalpataru
- Written by: Mohanji Prasad (story); Kader Khan (dialogue)
- Screenplay by: K.B. Pathak
- Produced by: S.K. Jain; B.K. Jaiswal; Mohanji Prasad
- Starring: Meenakshi Seshadri; Rishi Kapoor
- Cinematography: Sudhin Majumdar
- Edited by: B.S. Glaad
- Music by: Laxmikant–Pyarelal
- Release date: 26 May 1989 (India)
- Running time: 2 hours 18 min
- Country: India
- Language: Hindi

Bade Ghar Ki Beti (transl. A girl from rich family) is a 1989 Indian Hindi-language drama film directed by Kalpataru. It stars Rishi Kapoor and Meenakshi Seshadri in pivotal roles.

== Plot ==
Mala is the daughter of Kishanlal, who works as a servant for a wealthy family. One day, Mala meets the head of the family, who is so impressed by her that he asks for her hand in marriage for his fourth son, Gopal, which Kishanlal humbly accepts. Mala marries Gopal and moves into their palatial home. While Mala is helpful and sweet-natured, the other three daughters-in-law are quite the opposite.

When misfortune befalls the family, the patriarch passes away. Gopal and Mala move out, leaving Gopal's mother at the mercy of her indifferent sons, Girdhar, Murli, and Manohar, and their abusive wives, who refuse to assist with any household work, virtually forcing their mother-in-law to do all the menial tasks. They neglect her needs even when she falls ill and ultimately throw her out of the house.

Gopal gains popularity as a musician. Meanwhile, his brothers mortgage the family home to a moneylender and decide to live off Gopal, telling him that their mother has gone on a pilgrimage. Gopal eventually discovers the truth and confronts his brothers.

== Cast ==
- Meenakshi Seshadri as Mala
- Rishi Kapoor as Gopal
- Shammi Kapoor as Thakur Din Dayal
- Sushma Seth as Lakshmi Din Dayal
- Raj Kiran as Manohar
- Satish Shah as Murli
- Gulshan Grover as Giridhar
- Aruna Irani as Murli's wife
- Jayashree T as Manohar's wife
- Shoma Anand as Girdhar's wife
- Ashok Saraf as Kasturi
- Urmila Matondkar as Pushpa
- Kader Khan as Munimji
- Shivraj as Kishan Lal
- Urmila Bhatt as Mrs Kishan Lal
- Paintal as
- Pran in a special Appearance

== Soundtrack ==
Music is composed by Laxmikant–Pyarelal, while the songs are written by Santosh Anand and Hasan Kamal. "Teri Payal Baji Jahan" is set in the Raga Shivaranjani.

No.	Title	Lyrics	Singer(s)	Length
1.	"Jinka Ghar Ho Ayodhya Jaisa"	Santosh Anand	Suresh Wadkar
2.	"Teri Payal Baji Jahan"	Santosh Anand	Mohammed Aziz, Anuradha Paudwal
3.	"Samdhi Teri Ghodi"	Hasan Kamal	Hariharan, Mohammed Aziz, Alka Yagnik
4.	"Bade Ghar Ke Beti Ke Nakhre" (DJ Akash)	Santosh Anand	Suresh Wadkar, Kavita Krishnamurthy, Anuradha Paudwal
5.	"Karna Fakiri Phir Kya Dilgiri"	Santosh Anand	Suresh Wadkar, Kavita Krishnamurthy
6.	"Yeh Ladki Nahin Hai"	Santosh Anand	Mohammed Aziz, Alka Yagnik
