= Mahaguru (1985 film) =

1985 Hindi film

- Poster
- Directed by: S. S. Ravichandra
- Written by: Gyandev Agnihotri; Kader Khan (dialogues)
- Produced by: Chandra Sekhar
- Starring: Rajinikanth; Meenakshi Sheshadri; Rakesh Roshan
- Edited by: K. Gopalarao
- Music by: Bappi Lahiri
- Production company: Krishna Arts Combines
- Release date: 1985
- Country: India
- Language: Hindi

Mahaguru is a 1985 Indian Hindi-language action film directed by S. S. Ravichandra, stars Rajinikanth, Meenakshi Sheshadri in the lead roles. It was notable as the only film in which Meenakshi Sheshadri was paired opposite Rajinikanth and for its witty dialogues written by Kader Khan. The film was dubbed into Tamil as Raja Guru.

== Plot ==
Naagraj Darbari and his associate Shyam Kumar Talwari rule over a small community in India with an iron hand. When a former military officer, Subhash, comes home to his mother and sister, he is appalled at the conditions that the community is living in and decides to do everything possible to improve their lot. This gets him in the bad books of Darbari and Talwari, who recruit a hit-man named Mahaguru to deal with Subhash. Mahaguru confronts Subhash and severely beats him up, resulting in Subhash being crippled for life. Shortly thereafter, Mahaguru rescues Subhash's sister Laxmi from some men who were molesting her. Village belle Basanti, a close friend of Subhash, decides to have a go at turning Mahaguru around. She starts a friendship with him, finds out his name is really Vijay and he does respond positively and becomes attracted to her. This leaves Subhash free to assist the community, thus angering Darbari and Talwari all the more. They abduct Subhash and hold him prisoner and then instruct Mahaguru to do away with him.

== Cast ==
- Rajnikanth as Vijay / Mahaguru
- Meenakshi Sheshadri as Basanti
- Rakesh Roshan as Subhash
- Nirupa Roy as Subhash's Mother
- Gulshan Grover as Giri
- Kader Khan as Naagraj Darbari
- Shafi Inamdar as Shyam Kumar Talwari
- Shubha Khote as Chanda Talwari
- Anuradha as Dancer / Singer

== Music ==
It has four songs composed by Bappi Lahiri. All are written by Indeevar.

Song	Singer
"Jaal Daalo Ji"	Asha Bhosle, Amit Kumar
"Chikni Chikni"	Asha Bhosle, Kishore Kumar
"Phir Milne Aap"	Asha Bhosle, Shabbir Kumar
"Kuch Din Pehle"	Asha Bhosle, Manhar Udhas
