= Jurm (1990 film) =

- Directed by: Mahesh Bhatt
- Written by: Salim Khan
- Produced by: Mukesh Bhatt
- Starring: Vinod Khanna; Meenakshi Sheshadri; Sangeeta Bijlani; Shafi Inamdar; Sharat Saxena
- Cinematography: Nadeem Khan
- Edited by: Dimpy Bahl
- Music by: Rajesh Roshan
- Production company: Vishesh Films
- Release date: 13 July 1990
- Running time: 140 minutes
- Country: India
- Language: Hindi

Jurm (transl. Crime) is a 1990 Indian Hindi-language action film directed by Mahesh Bhatt and produced by his brother Mukesh Bhatt. It stars Vinod Khanna, Meenakshi Sheshadri and Sangeeta Bijlani. Salim Khan wrote the story and script. The film was successful and a hit at box office india. It is based on the 1987 movie Someone to Watch Over Me. Meenakshi Sheshadri and Sangeeta Bijlani were both nominated at the Filmfare awards, in the Best Actress and the latter in the Best Supporting category.

== Plot ==
Shekhar Varma (Khanna), is a Mumbai police inspector. He is happily married to Meena (Sheshadri) and they have a school-age daughter. One day, Shekhar's police department receives a call saying that an editor, Ritesh Nandy, has come across incriminating evidence that could expose the wrongdoings of some very influential people. Ritesh is killed despite being assigned police protection.

Geeta (Bijlani) presents herself as a witness to Ritesh's death, but cannot identify his killer. When her life is threatened, Shekhar and another inspector, Pramod Kadam (Inamdar), are assigned to protect her. In the process, Shekhar and Geeta fall in love, and Shekhar's wife begins to suspect her husband is having an affair. She manages to wring a confession out of him, then promptly leaves the house and moves in with her father. In the meantime, Pramod is wounded trying to protect Geeta and is hospitalized. Shekhar discovers that Ritesh's murder is the handiwork of high-ranking police officials.

== Cast ==
- Vinod Khanna as Inspector Shekhar Verma
- Meenakshi Seshadri as Meena Verma
- Sangeeta Bijlani as Geeta Sarabhai
- Shafi Inamdar as Inspector Pramod Kadam
- Sharat Saxena as Police Officer
- Anang Desai as Inspector Narayan
- Akash Khurana as Journalist Ritesh Nandy
- Om Shivpuri as Minister Kaalewar
- Jack Gaud as Anthony
- Mahesh Anand as Durjan
- Girija Shankar as Police Commissioner
- Gurbachan Singh as Pradhan
- Gopi Desai as Inspector Kadam's Wife

== Awards ==
36th Filmfare Awards:

Nominated

- Best Actress – Meenakshi Seshadri
- Best Supporting Actress – Sangeeta Bijlani

== Music ==
The music was composed by Rajesh Roshan and the lyrics were written by Indeevar and Payam Sayeedi. A popular song from the score is the romantic duet Jab Koi Baat Bigad Jaye sung by Kumar Sanu and Sadhana Sargam. It is a copy song of "500 Miles" (1963) Which was sung by Peter, Paul and Mary. The song was and is still popular. It shows the efforts and hard work of everyone involved. The song "Marne Ke Dar Se Mere Dil" was heavily inspired by Madonna's "La Isla Bonita".

Song	Singer
"Jab Koyi Baat Bigad Jaye – 1"	Kumar Sanu, Sadhana Sargam
"Duniyawale Bhi Kya Yaad Karenge"	Manhar Udhas, Sadhana Sargam
"Jab Koyi Baat Bigad Jaaye – 2"	Sadhana Sargam, Kumar Sanu
"Hum Do Hamare Ho Do"	Amit Kumar, Sadhana Sargam
"Marne Ke Dar Se Mere Dil"	Asha Bhosle, Mohammed Aziz
"Jab Koyi Baat Bigad Jaaye – Sad"	Kumar Sanu
