= Jeevana Poratam =

- Theatrical release poster
- Directed by: Rajachandra
- Produced by: T. Subbarami Reddy; P.Sashi Bhushan
- Starring: Sobhan Babu; Rajinikanth; Vijayashanti; Radhika; Urvashi
- Edited by: D. Rajagopal
- Music by: Chakravarthy
- Release date: 10 April 1986
- Country: India
- Language: Telugu

Jeevana Poratam is a 1986 Indian Telugu-language film directed by Rajachandra. It stars Sobhan Babu and Rajinikanth as brothers. The film is remake of Hindi film Roti Kapada Aur Makaan.

== Plot ==
Jeevana Poratam is a story about the mismanagement and selfishness of the political leaders of India. Many people had striven for the independence of the country, but the post-independence scenario was totally opposite of the masses aspirations. Bharath (Sobhan Babu) has become the victim. In spite of being a gold medalist, he had to suffer unemployment. His father Gummadi always scolds him for this. He has 2 brothers, Rajanikanth and Naresh and a sister. Rajanikanth joins hands with bad people and when Sobhan scolds him, he joins the army (when he comes in the he has lost his hand in war).

Vijayashanti and Sobhan are shown to be in love. When Vijayashanti gets a job in wealthy Sharat Babu's office she falls for him and neglects Sobhan. She even gets engaged to Sharat. Around this time, Radhika enters Sobhan's life. Due to circumstances, Sobhan joins hands with Rao Gopalrao and becomes rich. Rajanikanth comes back and helps his brother to leave the bad people and all ends well.

== Cast ==
- Sobhan Babu as Bharath
- Rajinikanth
- Radhika
- Vijayashanti
- Sarath Babu
- Meenakshi Seshadri in Special appearance
- Naresh
- Urvashi
- Sarath Babu
- Kaikala Satyanarayana
- P. L. Narayana
- Suthi Velu
- Prasad Babu
- Pushpalata
- Sri Lakshmi

== Soundtrack ==
No.	Title	Singer(s)	Length
1.	"Jalataru Jallammo"	P. Susheela, S. P. Balasubrahmanyam	4:09
2.	"Marachipo Nesthamaa"	K. J. Yesudas	4:35
3.	"Marachipo Nesthama" (Part II)	S. P. Balasubrahmanyam	4:40
4.	"Dasaradha Ramudu Neevanta"	P. Susheela, S. P. Balasubrahmanyam	4:36
5.	"Maruvakuma Anuragam"	P Susheela, S. P. Balasubrahmanyam	4:27
6.	"Oho Panditha Putra"	P Susheela, S. P. Balasubrahmanyam	4:34
7.	"Maruvakuma Anuragam"	S. P. Balasubrahmanyam	4:07
