= Humshakal (1992 film) =

- Promotional Poster
- Directed by: Kalpataru
- Screenplay by: K.B. Pathak and Vinod Khanna
- Story by: K.B. Pathak
- Produced by: Roop Kadar
- Starring: Shammi Kapoor; Vinod Khanna; Meenakshi Seshadri
- Cinematography: Munir Khan
- Edited by: V.K. Naik
- Music by: Laxmikant–Pyarelal
- Release date: 31 July 1992 (India)
- Country: India
- Language: Hindi

Humshakal (transl. Doppelganger) is a 1992 Indian Hindi-language action film directed by Kalpataru. It stars Shammi Kapoor, Vinod Khanna and Meenakshi Seshadri in pivotal roles.

== Plot ==
Commissioner Din Dayal Kapoor makes Dadu Kaliya take the place of his lookalike inspector Vinod, who was killed by Devi Dutt, but how long will he be able to hide the secret of Vinod's death from his family?

== Cast ==
- Shammi Kapoor as Commissioner Din Dayal Kapoor
- Vinod Khanna as Inspector Vinod / Sunil Kumar / Dadu Kaliya
- Meenakshi Seshadri as Sarah (Vinod's Wife)
- Kiran Juneja as Vicky (Sunil's Girlfriend)
- Kamini Kaushal as Sunil's Mother
- Nirupa Roy as Vinod's Mother
- Kader Khan as Devi Dutt
- Puneet Issar as Kundan
- Shafi Inamdar as Inspector Kulkarni
- Sharat Saxena as Tony
- Bharat Bhushan as The Judge

== Songs ==
1. "Jam Jam Ke Mar Sanam" - Kavita Krishnamurthy, Sudesh Bhosle
2. "Koi Baat Puchhe Bina" - Mohammed Aziz, Anuradha Paudwal
3. "Kuchh Na Socha Kuchh Na Dekha" - Kavita Krishnamurthy, Alka Yagnik
4. "Tere Dil Mein Rehna" - Mohammed Aziz, Anuradha Paudwal
5. "Pinky Meri Jaan Hai" - Mohammed Aziz, Kavita Krishnamurthy, Sonali Bajpayee
