= Parivaar (1987 film) =

1987 film by Shashilal K. Nair

- Promotional Poster
- Directed by: Shashilal K. Nair
- Produced by: Vidwan V. Lakshmanan
- Starring: Mithun Chakraborty; Meenakshi Sheshadri; Aruna Irani; Vikram Gokhale; Johnny Lever; Jagdeep
- Music by: Laxmikant–Pyarelal
- Release date: 12 June 1987 (India)
- Running time: 140 minutes
- Language: Hindi

Parivaar is a 1987 Indian Hindi-language film directed by Shashilal K. Nair, starring Mithun Chakraborty, Meenakshi Sheshadri, Aruna Irani, Jagdeep, Vikram Gokhale and Johnny Walker.

== Songs ==
1. "Baat Pate Ki Kahe Madaari" - Kishore Kumar, Kavita Krishnamurthy
2. "Tu Nache Main Gaoon" - Anuradha Paudwal, Suresh Wadkar
3. "Cham Cham Chanda Hai" - Kavita Krishnamurthy, Anupama Deshpande, Baby Tabassum
4. "Aankhon Aankhon Me" - Kavita Krishnamurthy, Mohammed Aziz
5. "Zindagi Ek Dard Hai" - Nitin Mukesh
6. "Ram Bhakt Hanuman" - Kavita Krishnamurthy

== Cast ==
- Mithun Chakraborty as Birju Madari, Anita's love-interest
- Meenakshi Sheshadri as Anita, Avinash's wife, Birju's love-interest
- Shakti Kapoor as Avinash, Anita's husband, Mangala and Dinesh's son
- Baby Guddu as Bobby, Birju's daughter
- Master Makrand as Bittu, Birju's son
- Aruna Irani as Mangala, Avinash's mother
- Anoop Kumar as Dinesh, Avinash's father
- Vikram Gokhale as Pratap, Anita's father
- Mukri as Banwari, goon hired for murdering Birju and Anita
- Johnny Lever
- Vikas Anand as childless father
- Raj Tilak as Nagoba - Bandit Boss
- Beena Banerjee as childless mother
- Shashi Kiran as Announcer
- K.K. Raj as Bandit - Driver who killed advocate
- Sunil Dhawan as Doctor
- Jayant Dave
- Jagdeep as Constable Hukumat Singh
- Sadhana Singh as Bobby's mother
