= Teri Payal Mere Geet =

- Promotional Poster
- Directed by: Rehman Naushad
- Written by: Naushad
- Story by: Naushad
- Produced by: Prem Lalwani
- Starring: Govinda; Meenakshi Sheshadri
- Music by: Naushad
- Release date: 24 December 1993
- Country: India
- Language: Hindi

Teri Payal Mere Geet is a 1993 Hindi movie produced by Prem Lalwani, starring Govinda and Meenakshi Sheshadri. The movie was directed by Rehman Naushad.

== Story ==
It's a love story about Premee (Govinda) and Laila Jaan (Meenakshi Sheshadri). Premi loves Laila Jaan and one day he finds out that she works at a brothel. Later Premi finds out that Laila Jaan was an ordinary dancer and he tries to win her back. He kisses her and she slaps him. He then abducts her and they fall in love.

== Cast ==
- Govinda as Premee
- Meenakshi Sheshadri as Laila Jaan / Leela
- Shakti Kapoor as Benni
- Kadar Khan as Jhanjhotia
- Johnny Lever as Dubey
- Bharat Bhushan as Ustad Khan
- Navin Nischol as Thakur

== Soundtrack ==
Movie featured 8 songs. Music was by Naushad and lyrics by Hasan Kamal.

Teri Payal Mere Geet

Soundtrack album by Naushad Ali
- Released: 17 Dec 1993
- Genre: Feature film soundtrack

Song	Singer
"Kya Kahe Aaj Kya Ho Gaya"	Lata Mangeshkar
"Mohabbat Ka Ek Devta"	Lata Mangeshkar
"Duniya Ke Mele Mein"	Lata Mangeshkar
"Baat Sabse Karo"	S. P. Balasubrahmanyam
"Teri Payal Mere Geet"	S. P. Balasubrahmanyam
"Zindagi Mein Kam Se Kam"	S. P. Balasubrahmanyam
"Kaahe Sajan Ko Sajaniya"	Mohammed Aziz
"Chhune Nahin Dungi"	Hariharan
