= Shankara (1991 film) =

- Music album cover
- Directed by: Sudarshan Nag
- Screenplay by: Jagmohan Kapoor
- Dialogues by: Vijay Sinha
- Story by: Jagmohan Kapoor
- Produced by: Deven Tanna
- Starring: Sunny Deol; Neelam; Sushma Seth; Paresh Rawal; Kiran Kumar
- Cinematography: Shyam Rao
- Edited by: Waman Bhonsle; Gurudutt Shirali
- Music by: Laxmikant–Pyarelal
- Production company: Ranjan Films
- Release date: 29 March 1991
- Country: India
- Language: Hindi

Shankara is a 1991 Indian Bollywood film directed by Sudarshan Nag and produced by D. Tann. It stars Sunny Deol and Neelam.

== Plot ==
The plot begins when a wealthy matriarch, Rani Maa, who is facing threats from her enemies, hires Shankar to protect her daughter, Seema. To deter their adversaries, Rani Maa publicly announces that Shankar is betrothed to Seema—an arrangement that is purely a ruse.

However, Shankara is unknowingly drawn into a complex web of conspiracies. He soon realizes that the true threats are not just external (such as the dacoit Kehar Singh), but are being orchestrated from within the mansion by two manipulative and greedy household figures: Diwan and Munshi. These conniving men, along with Munshi's nephew Popatlal who also desires to marry Seema, are greatly disturbed by Rani Maa's decision and have their own sinister motives to gain control of the wealth.

As Shankara spends more time with Seema, the pretense of their engagement evolves into a genuine and passionate romance. This new development further complicates the perpetrators' carefully laid plans. The tension culminates in a dramatic confrontation during the supposed fake wedding ceremony, where Kehar Singh and his men attack the haveli. Shankara must fight not only to protect Seema from physical harm but also to expose the true intentions of the internal conspirators and bring them all to justice.

== Cast ==
- Sunny Deol as Shankar "Shankara"
- Neelam as Seema – Shankar's girlfriend and fiancée
- Sushma Seth as Rani maa – Seema's mother
- Paresh Rawal in a dual role of identical twins as
  - Diwan Hukum Singh
  - Kehar's father
- Kiran Kumar as Kehar Singh
- Sulabha Deshpande as Shankar's mother
- Shakti Kapoor as Popatlal
- Rajesh Puri as Munshi
- Praveen Kumar as Goga
- K.K. Raj as Kehar Singh's henchman

== Music and soundtrack ==
The music of the film was composed by Laxmikant-Pyarelal and the lyrics of the songs were penned by Hasan Kamal.

1. "Jaana Na Nain Milake" - Mohammed Aziz, Alka Yagnik
2. "Apna Banake Sapna Dikhake" - Anuradha Paudwal
3. "Apna Banake Sapna Dikhake" - Anuradha Paudwal
4. "Behna O Behna" (Sad) - Anuradha Paudwal, Mohammed Aziz
5. "Behnaa O Behnaa" - Anuradha Paudwal, Mohammed Aziz
6. "Hum Premi Mastane" - Sudesh Bhosle, Mohammed Aziz, Alka Yagnik
