= Toofan (1989 film) =

1989 Hindi film directed by Ketan Desai

- Theatrical poster designed by Chandrakant
- Directed by: Ketan Desai
- Written by: Salim Khan; K.K. Shukla
- Produced by: Manmohan Desai
- Starring: Amitabh Bachchan; Meenakshi Sheshadri; Amrita Singh; Pran
- Cinematography: Peter Pereira
- Edited by: Raju Kapadia; Mangal Mistry
- Music by: Anu Malik
- Distributed by: M.K.D. Films Combine
- Release date: 1989
- Running time: 176 minutes
- Country: India
- Language: Hindi
- Budget: ₹40 million
- Box office: ₹80 million

Toofan (lit. 'Cyclone') is a 1989 Indian Hindi-language superhero film directed by Ketan Desai. The film stars Amitabh Bachchan in a double role, one as the titular character and the other as a magician, along with Amrita Singh, Meenakshi Seshadri, Pran and Farooq Sheikh. The film was launched in 1987, but was delayed due to production issues and reshoots of the film post the debacle of Gangaa Jamunaa Saraswati (1988), also starring Bachchan and Seshadri.

It received mainly mixed reviews from critics and had a very strong opening at the box office, but crashed in the second week due to the release of Elaan-E-Jung starring Dharmendra and Jaya Prada. Eventually, the film ended up as an average grosser.

== Plot ==
The story revolves around two brothers, one of which has superpowers and is an avid follower of Lord Hanuman. The other character was that of a meek magician who aspires to perform an escape trick that had claimed the life of his street magician father.

== Cast ==
- Amitabh Bachchan as Toofan & Shyam (Double role)
- Meenakshi Seshadri as Radha
- Amrita Singh as Pickpocketer
- Farooq Shaikh as Gopal Sharma
- Kamal Kapoor as ACP Sharma
- Goga Kapoor as Daku Shaitan Singh
- Zarina Wahab as Mrs. Laxmi Gopal Sharma
- Sushma Seth as Devyani
- Raza Murad as Vikramjit
- Mahesh Anand as Daku Zaalim Singh
- Jack Gaud as Jagga, an associate of Daku Shaitan Singh
- Pran as Inspector Hanuman Prasad Singh "Toofan & Shyam's father"
- Manik Irani as Manglu Tribal leader and Radha's father
- Sudhir Dalvi as Dr. Sharma and Gopal's father
- Ramesh Deo as Jadugar Ramesh Kumar
- Master Makrand as Gopal's son
- Chandrashekhar as Doctor
- Bharat Bhushan as Priest in the temple (shown in the beginning)
- Jagdish Raj as IGP
- Bob Christo as Good mark gold smuggler
- Moolchand as Seth Dharamdas
- Jagdeep as Director, Guest appearance in song "Don't Worry be Happy"
- Sonu Walia as Herself, Guest appearance in the song "Don't Worry Be Happy"
- Chandrashekhar Dubey as Bride's father, Guest appearance in song "Don't Worry be Happy"

== Soundtrack ==
The music for this movie was given by Anu Malik with lyrics penned by Indeevar.

The song "Aaya Toofan" was the last song sung by Kishore Kumar for an Amitabh Bachchan film before his death. It is also the only film where Suresh Wadkar sang for Amitabh Bachchan. Although Kishore Kumar was one of the playback singers in the film, his name did not appear on the credit title which comes at the end of the film, but other singers were all credited.

The song "Haa Bhai Haa" was sampled from the Iranian song "Havar Havar" by Kourosh Yaghmaei which has also inspired the Hindi songs "Jawan Jawan Ishq Jawan Hai" and "Aaya Aaya" from Govinda's Billoo Badshah and Sunny Deol's Aag Ka Gola respectively. The song "Don't Worry Be Happy" drew inspiration from Bobby McFerrin's song "Don't Worry Be Happy".

Track	Song	Performed By	Lyricist
1	"Aaya Aaya Toofan"	Kishore Kumar	Indeevar
2	"Jaadugar Ka Jaadu"	Suresh Wadkar	Indeevar
3	"Haa Bhai Haa Mai Hu Jawaan"	Anuradha Paudwal, Amit Kumar	Gulshan Bawra
4	"Lanka Me Danka Bajaane Aaya"	Shabbir Kumar	Indeevar
5	"Don't Worry Be Happy"	Manhar Udhas, Amitabh Bachchan	Prayag Raj
6	"Aao Raas Rache Garba Raat Hai"	Alka Yagnik, Suresh Wadkar	Indeevar

== See also ==
- List of Indian superhero films
