= Duet (1994 film) =

1994 Tamil film

- Poster
- Directed by: K. Balachander
- Written by: K. Balachander
- Produced by: Rajam Balachander; Pushpa Kandaswamy
- Starring: Prabhu; Ramesh Aravind; Meenakshi Seshadri
- Cinematography: R. Raghunatha Reddy
- Edited by: Amirjan (2nd Unit); Ganesh–Kumar (Uncredited)
- Music by: A. R. Rahman
- Production company: Kavithalayaa Productions
- Release date: 20 May 1994
- Running time: 156 minutes
- Country: India
- Language: Tamil

Duet is a 1994 Indian Tamil-language romantic musical film written and directed by K. Balachander. The film stars Prabhu, Ramesh Aravind, Meenakshi Seshadri and marks the debut of Prakash Raj in Tamil cinema which he plays the antagonist. It was inspired by the 1990 French film Cyrano de Bergerac, which itself was based on the 1897 Edmond Rostand play of the same name. The film revolves around two musician brothers who fall in love with the same woman. It was released on 20 May 1994.

== Plot ==
In a bridge across a sea, saxophone music is heard which is played by Guna. He recollects about the tragedy which happened two years back in his life.

Guna and Siva are brothers who own an orchestra and are very popular with their performances. Both are very affectionate towards each other. Both of them look for love and eventually find one. The girl whom Siva chose reciprocates his love, while the girl chosen by Guna insults him for being fat, which hurts him. Eventually Siva's love fails, and he is heartbroken. To console him, Guna shifts to the city with Siva and his sister Seema.

Guna's father had an illegal affair with a woman named Sitamma during their childhood, and on his deathbed, his father gets a promise from Guna that he should accommodate her with them as she does not have anyone. Guna, who lost his mother, invites her to live with them. Sitamma accepts on the condition that nobody in the family should know how she is related to them and also she should be introduced as a cook. Unwillingly, Guna accepts that. Guna as a saxophone player, music director, and lyricist and Siva as a singer flourish in their career. Sitamma finds that Guna is a very affectionate person and Siva is a very sensitive person who cannot bear any downfalls in life even to a little extent.

Next to Guna's home is the house of film choreographer Anjali. Both Guna and Siva see her under different circumstances and fall in love. Siva approaches her directly and impresses her. On the contrary Anjali hears Guna playing saxophone and misunderstands that it is Siva who is playing it. She gets attracted to him for that reason. To make Anjali fall in love with him, Siva lies to her that he has all the talents of his brother. Guna, who feels inferior about his fat size, decides to begin a friendship with Anjali's father and gradually with her, unaware of the fact that she already loves Siva. Anjali responds to his indirect approach, thinking that it is done by Siva, but Guna is very happy that she loves him.

Film superstar Sirpy also gets attracted to Anjali and behaves very close with her, which irritates the possessive Siva. This creates a fight between the two. Sitamma finds about the misunderstanding among Guna, Anjali, and Siva and tells Guna about the love affair between Anjali and his brother, which shocks Guna. She tries to convince Guna to drop his love for her as Siva cannot tolerate any defeat in his life, to which Guna does not accept. Anjali gets confused when Guna confesses his love for her. Anjali also learns that Siva has lied to her about his saxophone and poem writing talent and gets furious on him. She asks him to drop the love as she does not want be the reason for the heat between two brothers. Siva decides that he will not accept anyone between them even if it happens to be his own brother.

Sirpy compels Anjali to marry him, and she refuses. Angry Sirpy gives a fake statement to the press that both himself and Anjali are in love and planned to get married shortly. Guna gets furious that Anjali cheated both him and his brother, but Anjali explains that she is not responsible. Anjali's father assures Anjali that Guna is right for her as she got attracted only to his talents and eventually her love should be for him. Sirpy provokes the heat between Guna and Siva, because of which Siva insults his brother and Sitamma, resulting in Sitamma's demise. Sirpy kidnaps Anjali to marry her. Unable to save Anjali, Siva comes back to his family, pleading to save her. Guna fights with Sirpy and rescues Anjali. However, Sirpy threatens Guna with Siva on the top of the hill. Siva pulls Sirpy, jumps from the hilltop, and dies with him.

Back to the present, it was the day when Siva died on the same place where Guna is playing saxophone on his memory. Anjali's father convinces Guna about Anjali and requests him to marry her or he will kill her by his hands as he could not tolerate her sufferings. Guna and Anjali finally unite.

== Cast ==
- Prabhu as Guna
- Ramesh Aravind as Siva
- Meenakshi Seshadri as Anjali (Voice dubbed by actress Saritha)
- Prakash Raj as 'Star Hero' Sirpy
- Sarath Babu as Paramaguru
- Sudha as Sitamma
- Sathyapriya as Anjali's mother
- Shanthi Anand as Chandrika
- Senthil as Karumbaayiram
- Charle as Vellaiyan
- Subhalekha Sudhakar as Co-musician
- Kavithalaya Krishnan as Co-musician
- Dhamu as Beggar
- Mayilsamy as Mayilsamy
- Yuvasri as Anupama
- Roopa Sree as Seema
- Pasi Sathya as Anupama's maid
- Mohan Raman as Guna, Siva and Seema's father
- T. V. Varadarajan as TV anchor
- Ayyappan Gopi as Sirpy's friend
- Kazan Khan as Sirpy's friend
- Sakthi Kumar as Film director
- Yuvarani as Student
- Ilavarasi as herself (Cameo appearance)
- Vichithra as herself (Cameo appearance)
- Kasthuri as herself (Cameo appearance)
- Arvind Swamy as himself (Cameo appearance)
- Nassar as himself (Cameo appearance)
- Nizhalgal Ravi as himself (Cameo appearance)
- Solomon Pappaiah as himself (Cameo appearance)

== Production ==
The film is based on the 1990 French film Cyrano de Bergerac, which itself was based on the 1897 play of the same name by Edmond Rostand, which was about a swashbuckler who is self-conscious about his long nose and feels his love will go unrequited. In Duet, the hero's ungainly nose was replaced by his girth. Ramesh Aravind approached Balachander about acting in the film, and although Balachander initially refused, he gave in as Aravind as adamant. This was the first film of Prakash Raj in Tamil. In remembrance, he named his production house Duet Movies. Saran was one of the assistant directors in the film. Although the film's storyline is set in Chennai, 90% of the film was shot predominantly in and around Bheemunipatnam, Srikakulam, Vizianagaram, Araku Valley, Rayagada and Vishakhapatnam yet the remaining 10% of portions were shot in Chennai as well.

== Soundtrack ==
The soundtrack was composed by A. R. Rahman and lyrics were written by Vairamuthu. The soundtrack features eight songs, three recitals and three instrumental pieces. The saxophonic instrumentation was done by Kadri Gopalnath and Raju. Gopalnath reached public fame after this album. He once told about this album, "I played some 30 ragas for Rahman. He wasn't satisfied. Finally I played Kalyana Vasantam, and he said, "That's it!"". The song "Mettu Podu" is set in the raga Anandabhairavi, and "Anjali Anjali" is set in Maand.

Tamil tracklist
No.	Title	Lyrics	Singer(s)	Length
1.	"En Kadhale" (male)	Vairamuthu	S. P. Balasubrahmanyam	5:19
2.	"Vennilavin Theril"	Vairamuthu	K. J. Yesudas	4:08
3.	"Mettuppodu Mettuppodu"	Vairamuthu	S. P. Balasubrahmanyam, P. Susheela	5:58
4.	"Anjali Anjali"	Vairamuthu	S. P. Balasubrahmanyam, K. S. Chithra	6:16
5.	"Kulicha Kuthalam"	Vairamuthu	S. P. Balasubrahmanyam, T. K. Kala	4:48
6.	"Kathirikka Kathirikka"	Vairamuthu	Sujatha Mohan, V. V. Prasanna	5:27
7.	"En Kadhale" (female)	vairamuthu	K. S. Chithra	0:56
8.	"Naan Paadum"	vairamuthu	S. P. Balasubrahmanyam	3:53
9.	"Kavithaikku Porul" (poem)		Prabhu, Sreeja Ravi	1:20
10.	"Saththatinal Vantha" (poem)		Prabhu	0:54
11.	"Love is Torture" (poem)		Noell James	0:47
12.	"Sax Lullaby" (Instrumental Saxophone Music)		—	1:43
13.	"Title Theme Music" (Instrumental)		—	3:13
14.	"Naan Parthathile" (Instrumental Saxophone Music)		—	0:55
15.	"Tabla prelude" (Instrumental)		—	0:23
16.	"Anjali Anjali" (Longer version with extra instrumentation)	vairamuthu	S. P. Balasubrahmanyam, K. S. Chithra	8:07

All lyrics are written by P. K. Mishra.

Hindi tracklist
No.	Title	Singer(s)	Length
1.	"Anjali Anjali"	S. P. Balasubrahmanyam, K.S. Chithra	6:17
2.	"Sun Le O Janam"	K.S. Chithra, Nabarun Ghosh	4:53
3.	"Dil Ka Raja"	Sujatha Mohan	5:27
4.	"Aye Chandini"	S. P. Balasubrahmanyam	5:14
5.	"Mohabbat Mein Teri"	S. P. Balasubrahmanyam	4:08
6.	"Man Dole"	S. P. Balasubrahmanyam	5:54
7.	"Geeton Mein"	G Venugopal	3:57
8.	"Title Theme Music" (Instrumental)	—	3:13

== Reception ==
K. Vijiyan of New Straits Times wrote, "It is a simple story but Balachander's screenplay and handling of the cast make it memorable". R. P. R. of Kalki praised Kadri Gopalnath's saxophone work, art direction and cinematography but panned the humour and the fight scenes calling them dark spots. He concluded the review by saying even though the film is dragged, since it is romantic it can be enjoyed.
