= Meraa Ghar Mere Bachche =

- Poster
- Directed by: Chander Vohra
- Written by: Vasant Sabnis
- Screenplay by: Jainendra Jain
- Produced by: L. V. Prasad
- Starring: Raj Babbar; Smita Patil; Meenakshi Sheshadri
- Cinematography: Apurba Kishore Bir
- Edited by: A. Sanjeevi
- Music by: Laxmikant–Pyarelal
- Release date: 23 August 1985
- Country: India
- Language: Hindi

Meraa Ghar Mere Bachche (transl. My home, My children) is a 1985 Indian Hindi-language film directed by Chander Vohra and produced by L. V. Prasad. It stars Raj Babbar, Smita Patil, Meenakshi Sheshadri in pivotal roles.

== Cast ==
- Raj Babbar as Balwant Bhargav / Arun Bhargav
- Smita Patil as Geeta
- Meenakshi Sheshadri as Sarita
- Vijayendra Ghatge as Dr. Shrikant Bhargav
- Sushma Seth as Heerabai
- Asrani as Lallan
- Dinesh Hingoo as Mukadam

== Soundtrack ==
Lyrics: Anand Bakshi

Song	Singer
"Kya Hoti Hai Unchi Zat"	Lata Mangeshkar
"Jhansi Pe Rail Gaadi"	Asha Bhosle
"Jhansi Pe Rail Gaadi"	Suresh Wadkar
"Thandi Thandi Hawaen"	Shabbir Kumar
"Mausam Awaazen De Raha Hai, Aaja Aaja"	Shabbir Kumar, Anuradha Paudwal
"Kele Ki Hui Hai Sagai"	Kavita Krishnamurthy
