= Rajesh Puri =

Indian television actor

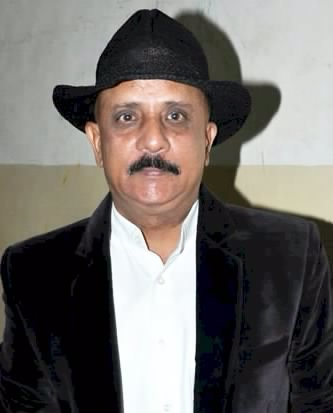
- Rajesh Puri in 2014
- Education: National School of Drama
- Occupation: actor

Rajesh Puri is an Indian television actor. He acted in comedy serials like Yeh Duniya Gazab Ki. Rajesh also acted in a DD1 serial Aamrapali (TV serial) in 2002. He is also identified as Lalit Prasad (a.k.a. Lalloo) of Hum Log, the Television series of the 1980s. He is seen in mostly comedy shows like Hi Zindagi Bye Zindagi (Zee TV), One Two Ka Four (Zee TV), Ek Se Badkar Ek (DD National) and Fantush (DD Metro). In 2019, he played Sunil Bansal in Shakti - Astitva Ke Ehsaas Ki on Colors TV and movie Zindagi Tumse (2019).

== Life ==
He graduated from National School of Drama.

== Advertisement ==
He played the role of "Cherry Chaplin" in the tv advertisements for "Cherry Blossom" brand of shoe polish.

== Television ==
His most famous roles have been:

1. Lalit Prasad (Lalloo) in Hum Log, the first Indian TV soap serial
2. Munimji (accountant) in Buniyaad

== Selected filmography ==
| Year | Title | Role |
|---|---|---|
| 1984-85 | Hum Log (TV Series) | Lalit Prasad a.k.a. Lalloo |
| 1983 | Jaane Bhi Do Yaaro | Kamdar |
| 1983 | Mazdoor | Mill Worker |
| 1986 | Jhanjaar | Pitambar |
| 1986 | Manav Hatya | Muthuswamy |
| 1986 | Muddat | Moti |
| 1986 | Amrit | Baba |
| 1986 | Ghar Sansar | David henchman |
| 1986 | Dahleez | Lallu |
| 1986 | Mazloom | Sher Ali |
| 1987 | Inaam Dus Hazaar | Rickshaw Passenger |
| 1987 | Himmat Aur Mehanat | Daplu |
| 1987 | Diljalaa | Mr Mittal Bank Manager |
| 1987 | Awam (film) | Baldev Singh, Taxi Driver |
| 1988 | Mere Baad | Kishori |
| 1988 | Agnee | Kishorilal |
| 1989 | Pati Parmeshwar | |
| 1989 | Dana Paani | Pyare Bhai |
| 1989 | Suryaa: An Awakening | Munim |
| 1989 | Jaisi Karni Waisi Bharni | Pyarelal |
| 1989 | Mujrim | Lala, Grocery Shop Owner |
| 1989 | Aag Ka Gola | Bajrang, Mechanic |
| 1990 | Vidrohi | Shankar |
| 1990 | Amiri Garibi | Khairu |
| 1990 | Dil | Pandit |
| 1990 | Jawani Zindabad | Akbar |
| 1991 | Khoon Ka Karz | Bollywood Actor Hungama |
| 1991 | Shankara (1991 film) | Munshiji |
| 1991 | Kurbaan | Police Sub Inspector |
| 1991 | Pratikar | Murli |
| 1992 | Sanam Aap Ki Khatir | Bus Conductor, Petrol Pump Man, Parsi Icecream Seller |
| 1992 | Giraft | |
| 1992 | Deedar | |
| 1992 | Isi Ka Naam Zindagi | Jai, Astrologer |
| 1993 | Game | Nachani Builder |
| 1993 | King Uncle | Hero in the Movie in Movie Theatre |
| 1993 | Apaatkaal | Dayaram |
| 1993 | Phool Aur Angaar | Student Of City College |
| 1993 | Gunaah | Sujit Singh |
| 1993 | Hasti | Mangu |
| 1993 | Andha Intequam | Laundry manager |
| 1994 | Dulaara | Bhikaridas (Bhiku), College Student whose hands are tied with handcuffs |
| 1994 | Fauj | Anokhe Lal's (Harish Patel) assistant |
| 1994 | Dilwale | Mental Hospital Patient |
| 1994 | Rakhwale | Police Constable |
| 1994 | Aao Pyar Karen | Bakhish |
| 1996 | Tu Chor Main Sipahi | Commissioner's doctor |
| 1997 | Police Station | Major |
| 1998 | X Zone | Pandit(Episode-96) |
| 1998 | Barood | Dance show organizer |
| 1999 | Hogi Pyaar Ki Jeet | Pandit |
| 1999 | Gair | Manager |
| 2000 | Aaghaaz | Professor Pillai |
| 2004 | Bhola in Bollywood | |
| 2016 | Saath Nibhaana Saathiya | Keshav Rathod |
| 2019 | Shakti - Astitva Ke Ehsaas Ki | Sunil Bansal |
| 2022 | Saath Nibhaana Saathiya 2 | Rajesh Seth |
