= Mujrim =

1989 film by Umesh Mehra

- Directed by: Umesh Mehra
- Written by: P. D. Mehra; Vinay Shukla
- Produced by: Parvesh Mehra
- Starring: Nutan; Mithun Chakraborty; Madhuri Dixit
- Music by: Anu Malik
- Distributed by: Eagle Films
- Release date: 28 July 1989
- Running time: 153 minutes
- Country: India
- Language: Hindi

Mujrim (transl. Criminal) is an Indian Hindi-language action film released in 1989, directed by Umesh Mehra. The film stars Nutan, Mithun Chakraborty, Madhuri Dixit in the lead roles, along with Shakti Kapoor, Suresh Oberoi, Gulshan Grover, Amrish Puri in supporting roles. The film follows the story of Shankar, who is regarded as a criminal by the society after being in jail for ten years since childhood. The film was successful.

== Synopsis ==
Shankar (Mithun Chakraborty) was jailed at the age of thirteen, when he killed his uncle, who tried to sell his mother, Yashoda (Nutan), to a rich and powerful man called Khan (Amrish Puri). He was imprisoned for ten years. When he comes back home, he finds his mother and sister in poor condition. He tries to keep his behavior appropriate and make amends, but all his attempts fail, as he is widely recognized as a criminal. Thus, he joins a group of criminals, whose leader is a generous man called Malik (Sharat Saxena). His mother, an honest woman, refuses to accept him like this and decides she has nothing to do with him. He meets Malik's daughter Sonia (Madhuri Dixit) and the two fall in love. Malik appreciates Shankar's loyalty and authorizes him as his principal successor. After Malik's death, Shankar takes over and gets into business terms with Khan. Shankar and Sonia get married and move into their new house. Shankar's one and only wish is to reunite with his mother, but she refuses and requires him to leave the crime world.

The matters get complicated, and Shankar loses his way. He loses his friends in endless fights with the police, and finally, when Sonia finds out that she is pregnant, she leaves him and comes to live with Yashoda. Alone and neglected, he comes back home, but then his previous life persecutes him.

== Cast ==
- Nutan as Yashoda
- Mithun Chakraborty as Shankar
- Madhuri Dixit as Sonia
- Shakti Kapoor as Chandan
- Suresh Oberoi as Inspector Gokhale
- Gulshan Grover as Naagrajan
- Amrish Puri as Khan
- Sharat Saxena as Malik
- Jagdeep as Lakhpati
- Pallavi Joshi as Sunanda
- Kunickaa Sadanand as Maria
- Guddi Maruti as Bela, Sunanda's Friend
- Sulabha Arya as Taramati
- Viju Khote as Restaurant Manager Damodar
- Rajesh Puri as Lala
- Mahesh Anand as Raja
- Roopesh Kumar as Gulati
- Tej Sapru as Lucky
- Avtar Gill as Police Commissioner Thakkar
- Salim Ghouse as Africas Assistant

== Music ==
The movie has 7 songs, all of which were composed by Anu Malik. The soundtrack album featured very well-known singers Alka Yagnik and Sadhana Sargam who made here one of their first playback singing steps.

=== Songs ===
- "Mujrim Na Kehna Mujhe Logon" - Mohammed Aziz
- "Mujrim Na Kehna Mujhe Logon" (Sad) - Mohammed Aziz
- "Boom Boom Laka Laka Laka Boom" - Mohammed Aziz, Anu Malik
- "Naiyo Jeena Tere Bina" - Mohammed Aziz, Sadhana Sargam
- "Daata Pyar De" - Sadhana Sargam
- "Raat Ke Barah Baje" - Amit Kumar, Alka Yagnik, Anu Malik
- "Kukudoo Koo I Love You" - Dilraj Kaur
