= Inaam Dus Hazaar =

- Directed by: Jyotin Goel
- Produced by: Jyotin Goel
- Starring: Sanjay Dutt; Meenakshi Sheshadri
- Edited by: Omkarnath Bhakri
- Music by: R. D. Burman
- Release date: 27 February 1987
- Country: India
- Language: Hindi

Inaam Dus Hazaar is a 1987 Bollywood action comedy film directed by Jyotin Goel. It stars Sanjay Dutt, Meenakshi Sheshadri in lead roles in their only film together. It is inspired by Alfred Hitchcock's classic North by Northwest. The film was the seventh highest grossing Hindi film of 1987.

== Plot ==
Kamal Malhotra (Sanjay Dutt) is a salesman working with a table-fan manufacturing firm. He lives with his uncle and mother. One night in a jewel exhibition, he meets the Nawab of Chandrapur (Raza Murad). While introducing himself to the Nawab, his name is overheard by a member of a gang, Kamran (Viju Khote). He is invited by Kamran to meet a diamond dealer, Seth Narottam Johri. The members of the gang have actually mistaken him for the famous CID officer Kamal Malhotra. He is tied up and beaten badly and then left drunk in a car ready to be killed but manages to survive and the police arrest him before the gang can take him away to kill him. His uncle bails him out & he explains to the police what happened last night, but is unable to prove the identity of the gang as they cover there tracks well and we're expecting this visit with Kamal surviving.

Another night in a hotel, he finds Narottam Johri and tries to catch him. Narottam Johri is killed by another member of the gang, Luca (Gulshan Grover) and Kamal gets accused of the murder. He escapes from the hotel and tries to catch Luca, but the only thing he could get hold of is a train ticket. To save himself and to catch Luca, he flees from the police and travels by the same train in which Luca is travelling. There, he meets Sonia Shrivastav (Meenakshi Seshadri). To hide his identity, he introduces himself as Ashok Saxena to her.

In the train, the police come searching for him but he luckily escapes using Sonia as cover and having his back turned to them so as to not be noticed. Kamal narrowly escapes before the poilce arrive again, the police and train inductor don't believe Sonia when she says she's not with him (with Kamal hearing secretly) and arrest her but then Kamal drives away with the police car under the disguise as a policeman and with Sonia handcuffed to the car. After sometime spent together Sonia later tells Kamal that she is a model and is going to Bombay. In Actuality, she works for Captain S.P. Singh (Amrish Puri), whose gang is in search for CID officer Kamal Malhotra.

After some time Kamal and Sonia fall in love with one another and make their way to Bombay via helicopter thanks to a passerby who gives them a lift.

She makes the Captain understand in a meeting that she is trying to find the true identity of Kamal, while tricking him into thinking that she loves him. But the Captain realises that she cannot be trusted and asks Luca to kill her. However, Sonia makes a narrow escape and Luca is killed by her when he tries to Kill Kamal while he is asleep in her bed.

One night while Kamal is with the Nawab, he gets kidnapped by the Captain's men. However, he again manages to escape by getting himself caught by the police after creating chaos in an auction.

Towards the end, the Nawab organises an exhibition of his jewels, which Sonia is supposed to exhibit by wearing them. During the exhibition, Kamal is kept in a closed room for his own safety and to not interfere and he watches the exhibition on a CCTV. The Captain disguises himself as the Nawab by wearing a mask.

At this point, it is revealed that it is actually Sonia who is the real CID officer Kamal Malhotra, and she is working with the Captain to take revenge for her brother, who was killed by Luca. Kamal Malhotra (Sanjay) now realises that Sonia (now also Kamal Malhotra) actually loves him and was doing all this for a good cause.

Eventually they reunite during a chase for the Captain and express there love whole heartedly for one another.

The story ends with the Captain's death after a chase sequence and to end, Kamal (Sanjay) marries Sonia (Meenakshi).

== Cast ==
- Sanjay Dutt as Kamal Malhotra / Ashok Saxena
- Meenakshi Sheshadri as Sonia Shrivastav
- Raza Murad as Nawab Sahib
- Sharat Saxena as CID Inspector Indra
- Gulshan Grover as Lukka
- Amrish Puri as Captain S. P. Singh
- Shafi Inamdar as Karamat Khan, Rickshaw Driver
- Satish Kaul as Vikram Malhotra
- Kanan Kaushal as Savitri Malhotra
- Jagdish Raj as Horse Auctioneer
- Sudhir as Tony
- Viju Khote as Kamran
- Ramesh Deo as Narottam Johri
- Rajesh Puri as Rickshaw Passenger
- T.P.Jain as Veth Khanna

== Soundtrack ==
Lyrics: Majrooh Sultanpuri

Song	Singer
"Jane Bhi Do Yaar, Chhodo Inkaar"	Kishore Kumar
"Chand Koi Hoga Tumsa Kahan, Dekh Dale Saaton Aasman"	Kishore Kumar, Asha Bhosle
"Jo Chham Se Nikal Gayi Raat"	Asha Bhosle
"Kabhi Yeh Haath Hai"	Anuradha Paudwal
