= Lagaam =

Lagaaam
- Directed by: Desh Gautam
- Music by: Kalyanji Anandji
- Release date: 1976
- Country: India
- Language: Hindi

Lagaaam is a 1976 Bollywood film directed by Desh Gautam.

== Cast ==
- Yogeeta Bali as Kesar
- Bindu as Rita
- Prem Chopra as Sanga
- C.S. Dubey as Raghu
- V. Gopal as Paploo
- Farida Jalal as Chanda
- Jankidas as Lala Jankidas
- Satyendra Kapoor as Gopal
- Vinod Khanna as Bheema
- Ram Mohan as Sheru
- Dina Pathak as Bheema's mother

== Songs ==
1. "Aaj Pawan Ki Chal Chura Ke" – Lata Mangeshkar
2. "Jaise Moti Seep Se Bichhde" – Lata Mangeshkar
3. "Aadhi Aadhi Raat Meri Payaliya Bhaje" – Mohammed Rafi, Lata Mangeshkar
4. "Aa Idhar Aa Zara Nazar To Mil" – Asha Bhosle
