= Maa Beti =

- Directed by: Kalpataru
- Written by: Keshav Rathod (story); K.B. Pathak (Screenplay); Mahender Dehlvi (dialogue)
- Produced by: Shiv Kumar Jain, Mohanji Prasad
- Starring: Shashi Kapoor; Sharmila Tagore; Tanuja; Meenakshi Sheshadri; Pran; Kader Khan
- Cinematography: Baba Azmi
- Edited by: K. Nanda
- Music by: Anand-Milind
- Release date: 6 June 1986
- Running time: 158 minutes
- Country: India
- Language: Hindi

Maa Beti (English: Mother Daughter) is a 1986 Indian Family drama film starring Bollywood actors Shashi Kapoor, Sharmila Tagore, Tanuja, Meenakshi Sheshadri in the lead roles.

== Plot ==
Savitri lives a wealthy lifestyle with her businessman husband and daughter, Meenu. She gets pregnant a second time and gives birth to a son, Ketan, but dies. Her husband, unable to handle business and two children at the same time, remarries a woman named Laxmi. Laxmi, unaware of her brother Raghunandan's evil plans, ill-treats her stepchildren, causing them to run away. However, her life changes forever when Raghunandan swindles all their money and kicks Laxmi and her family out of the house.

== Cast ==
- Shashi Kapoor
- Sharmila Tagore as Savitri
- Meenakshi Sheshadri as Meenu/Asha
- Sachin as Ketan
- Tanuja as Laxmi
- Karan Shah as Meenu's love interest
- Pran as Ramu
- Kader Khan as Shiv Prasad
- Ashok Saraf as Shankar Prasad
- Jayshree T. as Shanta
- Nilu Phule as Raghunandan
- Manmohan Krishna
- Shubha Khote
- C. S. Dubey

== Soundtrack ==
Anjaan write the lyrics.

| # | Song Title | Singer |
|---|---|---|
| 1 | "Paise Bina" | Anuradha Paudwal |
| 2 | "So Ja Meri Gudiya" | Alka Yagnik |
| 3 | "Bani Re Meri Bitiya" | Shabbir Kumar and Shailendra Singh |
| 4 | "Mere Ghar Dwaar Ko" | Alka Yagnik |
| 5 | "Baje Badhayi" | Suresh Wadkar and Udit Narayan |
| 6 | "Kal Ki Baat Kahu Main" | Alka Yagnik |
| 7 | "Maine Apna Sanam Tujhe" | Anuradha Paudwal and Suresh Wadkar |
| 8 | "Mujhko sadkon se" | Anuradha Paudwal |
| 9 | "Na Maange Heera Moti" | Anuradha Paudwal, Mahendra Kapoor |
