= Mera Jawab =

1985 Indian film

- Directed by: N.S. Raj Bharath
- Release date: 15 February 1985
- Country: India
- Language: Hindi

Mera Jawab is a 1985 Indian film directed by N.S. Raj Bharath.

== Cast ==
- Jackie Shroff as Suresh / Solanki Patwardhan Lal
- Meenakshi Sheshadri as Poonam
- Parikshit Sahni as Arun
- Kader Khan as Inspector Ajay
- Shakti Kapoor as Danny
- Gulshan Grover as Kuku
- Shiva Rindani as Bunty
- Satyendra Kapoor as Dr. D'Souza

== Soundtrack ==
Lyrics: Santosh Anand

#	Title	Singer(s)
1	"Main Usse Itna Pyar Karta"	Manhar Udhas, Anuradha Paudwal
2	"Mere Liye Zindagi"	Manhar Udhas, Anuradha Paudwal
3	"Aa Baitha Hoon Dar Pe Tere"	Manhar Udhas, Anuradha Paudwal
4	"Main Hoon Hasina"	Laxmikant, Alka Yagnik
5	"Mere Liye Zindagi" (Female)	Anuradha Paudwal
