= Sachché Ká Bol-Bálá =

- Directed by: Dev Anand
- Written by: Dev Anand
- Produced by: Dev Anand
- Starring: Dev Anand; Jackie Shroff; Meenakshi Sheshadri; Hema Malini
- Cinematography: D. K. Prabhakar
- Edited by: Babu Sheikh
- Music by: Bappi Lahiri
- Production company: Navketan Films
- Release date: 27 January 1989
- Country: India
- Language: Hindi

Sachché Ká Bol-Bálá is an Indian film from 1989, produced, directed and starred by Dev Anand, along with Jackie Shroff, Meenakshi Sheshadri and a special guest appearance by Hema Malini.

== Plot ==
Karan Kaul is the editor of a daily newspaper called "The Truth". He is respected by his fans and critics alike. He loves Greta Saunders, a Swiss national of Indian origin. Karan then becomes a suspect and faces loss of credibility, when he is accused of killing Greta, after the police find evidence linking his footprints at the scene of crime.

== Cast ==
- Dev Anand as Editor Karan Kaul
- Hema Malini as Geeta/Greta Saunders (Extended Special appearance)
- Jackie Shroff as Nandi
- Meenakshi Sheshadri as Reema
- Prem Chopra as Nandkishore Bata
- Gulshan Grover as Talwar
- Dalip Tahil as Jill
- Sadashiv Amrapurkar as Inspector Nadkarni
- Satish Shah as Akram
- Jagdeep as Gulbadan Miyan
- Bob Christo as Henchman
- Marc Zuber as Police Commissioner Pandey (Special appearance)

== Music ==
Lyrics: Amit Khanna

Song	Singer
"Tanha Main Akela"	Kishore Kumar
"Yeh Hawayen, Yeh Baarish, Yeh Lamha, Yeh Aankhen"	Kishore Kumar, Asha Bhosle
"Main To Hoon Maalamaal"	Asha Bhosle
"Sachche Ka Bolbala, Jhuthe Ka Munh Kala"	Bappi Lahiri, Mohammed Aziz
"Sheeshe Ki Gudiya Hoon"	Alisha Chinai
"Dekh Lenge, Jaan Lenge"	S. Janaki
