= Mahaadev =

- Poster
- Directed by: Raj N. Sippy
- Written by: Vinay Shukla
- Produced by: Romu N. Sippy
- Starring: Vinod Khanna; Meenakshi Sheshadri; Raj Babbar; Sonu Walia
- Cinematography: Anwar Siraj
- Edited by: Ashok Honda
- Music by: Ilaiyaraaja
- Production company: Allied Pictures
- Release date: 5 May 1989
- Running time: 130 minutes
- Country: India
- Language: Hindi
- Budget: ₹20.5 million
- Box office: ₹70 million

Mahaadev is a 1989 Indian Hindi-language action thriller film directed by Raj N. Sippy. It stars Vinod Khanna, Meenakshi Sheshadri, Raj Babbar and Sonu Walia in pivotal roles. The film score and soundtrack were composed by Ilaiyaraaja. The film revolves around an ex cop (Khanna) who is aggravated by the unjust practices of the rich and corrupt people, which makes him rejoin the police force.

Mahaadev was released worldwide on 5th May 1989, coinciding with the Eid weekend. The film received positive reviews from critics and was declared "Hit" at the box office.

== Cast ==
- Vinod Khanna as SP Arjun Singh
- Meenakshi Seshadri as Geeta
- Raj Babbar as Kishan
- Sonu Walia as Dancer
- Shakti Kapoor as Inspector Sharma
- Anupam Kher as Mahesh Heera
- Kiran Kumar as Umesh Heera
- Sharat Saxena as Heera's son
- Mahesh Anand as Heera's son
- Anjan Srivastav as Chief Minister Nekchand
- Beena Banerjee as Radha
- Ashalata Wabgaonkar as Padma
- Tej Sapru as Paresh Heera
- Ram Mohan as SP Mishra
- Satish Shah as Bansilal
- Gulshan Grover as Henchman Yeshwant
- Vikas Anand as Ramlal
- Mohan Choti as Mohan

== Music ==
The soundtrack features six songs composed by Ilaiyaraaja. All songs were written by Farooq Qaisar, while "Mujhe Bahon Mein Bhar Ke" was written by Gulshan Bawra. The tracks "Mujhe Baahon Mein Bharke", "Chand Hai Tu" and “Fikar Na Kar Pyare” were reused from the songs "Antha Nilava Thaan", "Shenbagame Shenbagame" and “Uthama Puthiri” for the Tamil films Muthal Mariyathai, Enga Ooru Pattukaran and Guru Sishyan, respectively, all three of which were composed by Ilaiyaraaja. The track "Rimjhim Rimjhim" was recreated in Tamil by Ilaiyaraaja's son Yuvan Shankar Raja as "Theendi Theendi", for the Tamil film Bala (2002).

Song	Singer
"Fikar Na Kar"	Asha Bhosle
"Dilwale Raat Hai"	Asha Bhosle
"Rimjhim Rimjhim"	Asha Bhosle, Suresh Wadkar
"Mujhe Baahon Mein Bharke"	S. P. Balasubrahmanyam, Anuradha Paudwal
"Aaj Babua Bhaye"	S.P.Balasubramanyam, S. Janaki
"Aaj Babua Bhaye (Repeat)"	Mohammed Aziz, S. Janaki
"Chand Hai Tu"	Mohammed Aziz, S. Janaki

== Bibliography ==
- Arunachalam, Param (2020). BollySwar: 1981–1990. Mavrix Infotech. ISBN 978-81-938482-2-7.
