= Ghar Ho To Aisa =

- Directed by: Kalpataru
- Screenplay by: K. B. Pathak
- Dialogues by: Kader Khan
- Story by: Kalpataru
- Produced by: Firoz A. Nadiadwala
- Starring: Anil Kapoor; Meenakshi Seshadri; Raj Kiran; Deepti Naval
- Cinematography: Akber Balam; F. R. Khan
- Edited by: I. M. Kanu
- Music by: Bappi Lahiri
- Production company: Base Industries Group
- Release date: 27 April 1990
- Running time: 165 minutes
- Country: India
- Language: Hindi

Ghar Ho To Aisa (transl. This is what home should be like) is a 1990 Indian Hindi-language drama film directed by Kalpataru and produced by Firoz Nadiadwala. It stars Anil Kapoor and Meenakshi Seshadri in pivotal roles. The film was remade in Telugu as Attintlo Adde Mogudu. The popular pairing of Anil Kapoor and Meenakshi Sheshadri, which was featured in many films, was appreciated. Sheshadri's performance in particular as the feisty daughter-in-law who teaches her cruel in-laws a lesson was loved by audiences; providing a great contrast to Deepti Naval's character as the meek, oppressed daughter-in-law. Bindu played her trademark negative mother-in-law character with great conviction. The film was a box office success.

== Plot ==
Ramprasad and his wife Durga, their eldest son Vijay, his wife Sharada, their younger son Amar, their daughter Kanchan, and their granddaughter Pinky live together. Kanchan's husband, Bajrangi, is a resident son-in-law. Amar is unemployed. Durga is a short-tempered woman who physically and verbally abuses her daughter-in-law for every minor reason and belittles her for her poverty. Vijay follows her footsteps and is insensitive and abusive towards his wife and daughter. Durga's daughter, Kanchan, is just like her mother. Kanchan is also highly domineering over her husband. Ramprasad is a henpecked man. The only member of the family who actually cares for Sharada is Amar.

Amar runs into Seema, the daughter of Karamchand, a rich businessman. Seema runs a NGO for the welfare of women. Seema's father, Karamchand, pushes her to get married. Seema tries to involve Amar in a pretend marriage and entices him with money. Amar refuses her offer. Karamchand secretly overhears the entire exchange. Though disappointed with Seema, he is impressed with Amar's honesty and appoints him the manager of his factory.

Durga asks Amar to marry Sona, the only daughter of an industrialist offering a dowry of ten lakhs. Amar dismisses her idea. Durga demands ten thousand rupees from Sharada. Sharada pleads hard, but Durga has her thrown out of the house. Sharada's mother, living in poverty, finds out about her daughter and dies. Amar is devastated when he finds out that Sharada and Pinky died in a road accident. Nevertheless, the family is apathetic towards these deaths and nonchalantly asks Vijay to enter into an engagement with Sona. Vijay complies, much to Amar's disgust.

Seema takes Amar to a mother and daughter duo and tells him how they were kicked out of the house by their family. Amar is overjoyed to see Sharada and Pinky. Sharada tells Amar that two mentally challenged women wearing their clothes had actually died in the accident. Amar is enraged and vows revenge against his toxic family. Karamchand suggests that Amar and Seema pretend to be a married couple and exact revenge on the Kumars, to which both agree. Amar and Seema enter the Kumar as a married couple. Seema gradually brings order to the house by manipulating Kanchan, Durga, and Ramprasad to perform all household chores. Amar appoints Bajrangi to his office and gives him a good salary. Kanchan gives up her ego and learns to respect Bajrangi.

Meanwhile, Vijay is disgusted with Sona's gallivanting with so many men and her arrogance. She makes him remove her shoes, reminding Vijay of the way he treated Sharada, and he feels humiliated. Sona compares his loyalty to that of a dog, which causes Vijay to break the engagement. Vijay is deeply remorseful for being abusive towards his wife and daughter. He is overjoyed when he discovers that Sharada and Pinky are alive and begs Sharada for forgiveness. Learning the whole story from Sharada, Vijay returns home and declares that he is leaving his parents forever to live with his wife and daughter. Bajrangi also decides to leave home to start a new life with his wife and son. Durga begs Amar to stay, but Amar also tells her of his intent to leave.

Filled with guilt, Durga decides to immolate herself, but her sons prevent her from doing so. Durga weeps and begs Sharada for forgiveness and asks her children not to desert her. Karamchand arrives and reveals to the Kumars about Amar's ploy. Karamchand asks Seema to leave. Seema, who has fallen in love with Amar, becomes angry with his lack of action and drags him to his room, locking it. Seema angrily asks Amar why he is not stopping her from going with her father. She starts hurling things at Amar and bursts into tears. Amar tells Seema about his love for her and reconciles with her.

== Cast ==
- Anil Kapoor as Amar Kumar
- Meenakshi Seshadri as Seema
- Raj Kiran as Vijay Kumar, Amar's brother
- Deepti Naval as Sharda Kumar, Amar's sister-in-law
- Bindu as Durga Kumar, Amar's mother
- Saeed Jaffrey as Ram Prasad Kumar, Amar's father
- Kader Khan as Bajrangi, Amar's brother-in-law
- Om Prakash as Karamchand, Seema's father
- Javed Rizvi Jarehavi as Bajrangi's son
- Rita Bhaduri as Kanchan, Amar's sister
- Sonika Gill as Sona
- Satyen Kappu as Dwarka Prasad
- Urmila Bhatt as Neeta's Mother-in-law
- Jayshree Talpade as Neeta
- Sulbha Deshpande as Devki
- Chandrashekar as Doctor Surinder Mehra
- Mahesh Anand as Goon
- Dinesh Hingoo as Charity Show Organizer Laal Singh
- Mahavir Shah as Prince Arvind Singhal, of Palghat

== Soundtrack ==
All lyrics are written by Majrooh Sultanpuri.

Song	Singer
"January February March April May Aur June July"	Asha Bhosle, Mohammed Aziz
"Tu Mera Navra, Main Teri Navri, Le Chal Mujhe Tu"	Kavita Krishnamurthy, Mohammed Aziz
"Aage Aage Chhallewali"	Sudesh Bhosle
"Dil Laga Ke Dekho, Arey Dil Lagake Dekho"	Sudesh Bhosle, Alka Yagnik
