= Swati (1986 film) =

- Directed by: Kranthi Kumar
- Written by: Kranthi Kumar
- Produced by: L. V. Prasad
- Starring: Shashi Kapoor; Sharmila Tagore; Akbar Khan; Meenakshi Sheshadri; Madhuri Dixit; Vinod Mehra; Sarika
- Cinematography: Hari Anumolu
- Edited by: A. Sreekar Prasad; A. Sanjeevi
- Music by: Laxmikant–Pyarelal
- Release date: 2 May 1986
- Country: India
- Language: Hindi

Swati is a 1986 Indian Hindi-language romantic drama film directed by Kranthi Kumar. The film stars Meenakshi Sheshadri in the title role alongside an ensemble star cast consisting of Shashi Kapoor, Sharmila Tagore, Madhuri Dixit, Raja Bundela, Vinod Mehra, Akbar Khan and Sarika. Meenakshi Sheshadri's performance was highly appreciated and is considered amongst her best performances. The film was a remake of the director's own Telugu film of the same name. The film belongs to the art house cinematic genre, known in India as parallel cinema.

== Plot ==
Sharda (Sharmila Tagore) is in love with a young man named Satya Prakash. Sharda becomes pregnant, and Satya Prakash wants to marry her as soon as possible. He goes out to get the wedding date fixed with Panditji, but a few goons come and attack him, and in the process, he kills one goon. At the same time, a few goons attack Sharda and tell her that Satya Prakash has sold her, and they try to gang-rape her. She somehow manages to run away, but gets heartbroken when her boyfriend doesn't return and believes what the goons have told her. She decides to keep the child, names her Swati, re-locates to a small town in Southern India, and finds employment as a nurse with Dr. Rajendra. Years later, Swati (Meenakshi Sheshadri) has grown up to be an assertive young woman who is not only outspoken but also quite capable of physically defending herself. However, her attitude alienates her and Sharda from the community in general. She befriends Ram Mohan, an activist, who is often in trouble with the police. With no one to look after her mother after she gets married, Swati asks Rajendra, now a widower, to marry Sharda, to which he agrees. The marriage takes place, and both move in to live a wealthy lifestyle with Rajendra and his daughter, Anandi (Madhuri Dixit). Rajendra and Sharda decide to find a suitable groom for Swati, but before that could happen, Anandi finds out that she is pregnant with her boyfriend's child. So Swati and Sharda hide this and Swati's existence from Anandi's in-laws. So Swati moves out, while Anandi's marriage takes place with Prasad Chiranjivi Gupta. But Sharda's troubles with Swati are far from over, as Sharda's long-lost boyfriend, Satya Prakash, will soon return into her life, turning Sharda and Swati's lives upside down.

== Cast ==
- Shashi Kapoor as Dr. Rajendra Prasad
- Sharmila Tagore as Sharda
- Akbar Khan as Ram Mohan
- Meenakshi Sheshadri as Swati
- Madhuri Dixit as Anandi
- Vinod Mehra as Satyaprakash
- Raja Bundela as Kamdev Prasad Chiranjilal Rokadia "Kapil Dev"
- Arjun as Manohar Joshi
- Madhu Kapoor as Laxmi Joshi
- Shubha Khote as Saroj Bhatnagar
- Dinesh Hingoo as Satyanarayan Chaubey
- Sarika as Dancer / Singer

== Soundtrack ==
Lyrics: Anand Bakshi

Song	Singer
"Hindi Boli, Urdu Boli, Angrezi Mein Samjhaya"	S. P. Balasubrahmanyam, S. Janaki
"Shaadi Mubarak Bole Shehnai, Badhai Badhai"	Anuradha Paudwal, Alka Yagnik
"Main Tere Saath Hoon, Tu Mere Saath Hai"	Kavita Krishnamurthy, Manhar Udhas
"Aane Do Aane Do Ab Zubaan Pe Dil Ki"	Asha Bhosle, Manhar Udhas
"Jannat Ka Khwab"	Asha Bhosle
