= Mohabat Ka Paigham =

- Directed by: Padmini Kapila
- Screenplay by: Vikas Anand
- Story by: Vikas Anand
- Produced by: Mrs. Rani S. Kapila
- Starring: Shammi Kapoor; Raj Babbar; Aditya Pancholi; Meenakshi Sheshadri
- Cinematography: Ashok Gunjal
- Edited by: Omkarnath Bhakri
- Music by: Bappi Lahiri
- Release date: 1989
- Country: India
- Language: Hindi

Mohabat Ka Paigham is a 1989 Indian Hindi-language film directed by Padmini Kapila. The film stars Shammi Kapoor, Raj Babbar, Aditya Pancholi, Meenakshi Sheshadri in pivotal roles. The music of the film was composed by Bappi Lahiri.

== Cast ==
- Shammi Kapoor as Chaudhary Abdul Rehman
- Meenakshi Sheshadri as Zeenat Banu
- Raj Babbar as Nadeem Rehman
- Aditya Pancholi as Naeem Rehman
- Ranjeet as Raja
- Satyendra Kapoor as Dinu
- Shammi as Chand Bibi
- Yunus Parvez as Manzoor
- Pinchoo Kapoor as Usman

== Soundtrack ==
Lyrics: Anjaan

Song	Singer
"Pyar To Pyar Hai"	Mohammed Aziz
"Do Jahanwale"	Mohammed Aziz
"Ishq Hai Aisa"	Mohammed Aziz
"Nache More Man"	Anup Jalota, P.Susheela
"Mehfil Ho Dilwalon Ki"	Kumar Sanu, Sudesh Bhosle
