= Aurat Teri Yehi Kahani =

- Directed by: Mohanji Prasad
- Produced by: S. Jain; B. Jaiswal
- Starring: Raj Babbar; Meenakshi Seshadri
- Music by: Anand–Milind
- Release date: 1988
- Country: India
- Language: Hindi

Aurat Teri Yehi Kahani (transl. This is your story, woman) is a 1988 Indian Hindi-language film directed by Mohanji Prasad. It stars Raj Babbar and Meenakshi Seshadri.

== Plot ==
Shortly after giving birth to Savitri, her mother passes away, leaving her disabled father, Dharamraj, with no alternative but to remarry. He marries Champa, who later gives birth to a son, Ketan. Champa is extremely cruel to Savitri, frequently slapping and beating her.

Years later, the children have grown up, and Dharamraj has become heavily dependent on alcohol. Ketan secures a job in the city and moves away. Soon afterwards, the family receives a letter from him explaining that he has found employment but requires a security deposit of one thousand rupees.

To raise the money, Savitri agrees to marry an ageing wealthy widower, Thakur, in exchange for the one thousand rupees, on the condition that she repays the amount by Diwali. Although she is in love with Satyavan, she is forced into the marriage. However, on their wedding night, Thakur dies from a snakebite.

Now widowed, Savitri is sexually assaulted by Thakur's younger brother, Balwant, and, in despair, attempts to take her own life. She is rescued by several villagers, only to be sold to a madam named Jamunabai, who intends to force her to work as a courtesan for the rest of her life. Her wealthy patrons are delighted with her, and a rich nobleman, Nawab Hasmat Ali Baig, offers an enormous sum of money in exchange for her sexual favours.

The question is: what will Savitri do under these circumstances?

== Cast ==
- Raj Babbar ... Satyavan Sathu"
- Meenakshi Seshadri ... Savitri
- Nirupa Roy ... Thakurain
- Pran ... Ghotala
- Kader Khan ... Ghadbad
- Raj Kiran ... Balwant
- Shoma Anand ... Balwant's wife
- Aruna Irani ... Champa
- Dinesh Hingoo as Bisre.
- Mohan Choti as Bhule
- Shreeram Lagoo as Dharamraj
- Nilu Phule as Thakur sahab
- Shashi Puri as Ketan
- Ashok Saraf as Bhagwan Singh
- Sushma Seth as Jamunabai

== Soundtrack ==
#	Title	Singer(s)
1	"Aurat Teri Yehi Kahani"	Mohammed Aziz
2	"Holi Aayee Re"	Suresh Wadkar, Alka Yagnik
3	"Baar Baar Mere Pyar Se"	Alka Yagnik
4	"Sapera Bin Bajayega"	Alka Yagnik
5	"Jayegi Jayegi Jayegi Kahan"	Mohammed Aziz
6	"Raat Bhar Rahiyo"	Alka Yagnik
7	"Naam Pe Rasmon Ke Ye Aurat"	Alka Yagnik
8	"Kisi Se Pyar Ki"	Mohammed Aziz
9	"Ye Sach Hai Na Jhooth Hai"	Suresh Wadkar, Alka Yagnik
10	"Hamara Jobanava"	Kavita Krishnamurthy, Alka Yagnik
