= Hasan Kamal =

Indian lyricist and songwriter (born 1943)

- Born: 1 January 1943 (age 83); Lucknow, India
- Occupations: Lyricist, poet, columnist, journalist
- Years active: 1982-2008

Hasan Kamal (born 1 January 1943) is an Indian Lyricist, poet and columnist. The recipient of numerous awards, including Filmfare Award for Best Lyricist in 1985 for the title song of the film Aaj Ki Aawaz (1984), he started his career in 1981 with "Sar Se Sarke" song from Silsila. His last song as a lyricist is "Tose Naina Lagey" from Anwar.

== Early life and education ==
Kamal was born in Lucknow, India on 1 January 1943. He graduated from the Lucknow University and began his journalistic career as a Sub-editor of Blitz Weekly in 1965. He became the editor of Urdu Blitzin 1974 and brought up its circulation from 13,000 copies to 1,00,000 copies a week. He is a popular columnist with a regular column in Inquilab, Rozanama Rashtriya Sahara, Etmaad and Al-Bagh. His column is often translated into Tamil, Telugu, Marathi and English. He is a prominent poet of modern Urdu literature and has traveled widely internationally in his capacity as a journalist and poet. He is also a well-known lyricist and a writer of scripts for film and TV.

== Career ==
Hasan Kamal was a popular Indian film lyricist in the 1980s. He debuted in the 1982 film "Nikaah", directed by B. R. Chopra. It was also the comeback of prominent composer of the sixties, Ravi and the debut of Salma Agha as both an actress and singer. Ravi approached Hasan to write the lyrics. Hasan wrote 5 songs for him. "Dil Ke Armaan" and "Dil Ki Ke Yeh Arzoo Thi" were superhit tracks. The songs took the industry by a storm and made Salma and Hasan overnight stars. Hasan was nominated for Filmfare Award for both the songs, but lost it to Santosh Anand. In 1984, he wrote lyrics for the film Aaj Ki Aawaz. He was given the coveted Filmfare Award for its title track. He was once again nominated for filmfare award for the film Tawaif (1986).

== Filmography ==
- Nikaah (1982)
- Mazdoor (1983)
- Insaaf Kaun Karega (1984)
- Aaj Ki Awaz (1984)
- Hum Do Hamare Do (1984)
- Aitbaar (1985)
- Tawaif (1985)
- Dahleez (1986)
- Kirayadar (1986)
- Mera Dharam (1986)
- Sultanat (1986)
- Biwi Ho To Aisi (1988)
- Yateem (1988)
- Hathyar (1989)
- Kasam Suhaag Ki (1989)
- Batwara (1989)
- Suryaa: An Awakening (1989)
- Awaaz De Kahan Hai (1990)
- Pratigyabadh (1991)
- Sapnon Ka Mandir (1991)
- Shankara (1991)
- Teri Payal Mere Geet (1992)
- Kanoon (1993)
- Anwar (2007)
- Khela (2008)

== Discography ==
- "Dil Ki Yeh Arzoo Thi"
- "Faza Bhi Hai Jawan"
- "Beete Hue Lamhon Ki Kasak"
- "Dil Ke Arman Ansuon Mein Bah Gaye"
- "Chehra Chhupa Liya Hai"
- "Baat Adhuri Kyun Hai"
- "Hum Mehnat Kash Is Duniya Se"
- "Meherbanon Ko Mera Salaam Aakhri"
- "Tum Aaye To Hum Ko"
- "Bewafa Ja"
- "Dil Beqarar"
- "Ek Adhurisi Mulaqat Huyi Thi"
- "Haathkadiyan Pehnoongi"
- "Ikraar Kare Kis Se"
- "Inkaar Kare Kis Ko"
- "Tujhe Dekhein Bina Dil Nahin Mane"
- "Insaaf Kare Karega"
- "Aaj Ki Awaz, Jaag Aye Insaan"
- "Bharat Toh Hai Azaad, Hum Azaad Kab Kahelanyenge"
- "Joban Anmol Balma"
- "Mera Shohar"
- "Aaj Ki Shyam, Aap Ke Naam"
- "Tere Pyar Ki Tamanna"
- "Bahut Der Se Dar pe Aankhen Lagi Thi, Huzoor Aate Aate Bahut Der Ker Di"
- "Kirayadar"
- "Akkad Bakkad Bambe Bo"
- "Charon Taraf Pyar Hai"
- "Ga Raha Hai Dil Yehi Geet Bar Bar"
- "Dil Liya, Dil Diya, Phir Dil Ka Kya Hua"
- "Aa, Aa Galey Lag Jaa"
- "Javeda Zindagi"(Tose Naina Lagey)
- "Laut Aaye Woh"
- "Sarse sarki sarki chunariya"

== Awards and Recognitions ==
- Nominated, Filmfare Award for Best Lyricist- 1982 for Nikaah
- Won, Filmfare Award for Best Lyricist- 1984 for Aaj Ki Awaz
- Nominated, Filmfare Award for Best Lyricist- 1986 for Tawaif
- Nehru Cultural Association of U.P. Award in 1976
- Hindi Urdu Sahitya Award of UP in 1988
- Film Puraskar Ashirwad Award in 1986
- Sur Singar Dr. V.D. Arora Awards for Nikaah in 1983, Awam in 1987 and Teri Payal Meri Geet in 1992
- Arun-Amin Award for the most popular poet of the year in 1990
- Maulana Abul Kalam Azad Award for Literary works in 1996.
- The Press Council of India Award in 2012.
