= Aandhi-Toofan =

1985 film by Babbar Subhash

- LP Vinyl Records Cover
- Directed by: B. Subhash
- Produced by: Pahlaj Nihalani
- Starring: Mithun Chakraborty; Hema Malini; Shashi Kapoor; Shatrughan Sinha; Meenakshi Sheshadri; Danny Denzongpa; Kajal Kiran
- Music by: Bappi Lahiri
- Release date: 22 March 1985
- Running time: 135 min.
- Language: Hindi

Aandhi-Toofan ("Storm and Tempest") is a 1985 Indian Hindi-language film directed by B.Subhash, starring Shashi Kapoor, Hema Malini, Shatrughan Sinha, Mithun Chakraborty, Meenakshi Sheshadri and Danny Denzongpa. The story is very much a copy of Sholay with the characters and themes being identical.

== Plot ==
Notorious biker-gangster Balvir kills Inspector Ranjit Singh, who has arrested Balvir. After Killing Ranjit, Balvir strips Sheela naked and rapes her very brutally. Now Sheela has only one purpose, to take revenge on Balvir Thakur. She hires two men, Raghunath Shastri "Raghu" and Balwant Yadav "Ballu", to capture Balvir alive and bring him to her.

== Cast ==
- Shashi Kapoor as Inspector Ranjit Singh
- Hema Malini as Sheela R. Singh
- Shatrughan Sinha as Raghunath 'Raghu' Shastri
- Mithun Chakraborty as Balwant 'Ballu' Yadav
- Meenakshi Sheshadri as Meena Kapoor
- Danny Denzongpa as Balvir
- Raj Kiran as Jaanu
- Kaajal Kiran as Banu
- Mazhar Khan as Ajit, Balvir's Man
- Mac Mohan as Jagmohan Balvir's Man
- Sudhir as Ranjeet, Balvir's Man
- Tej Sapru as Pratap, Balvir's Man
- Manik Irani as Billa, Balvir's Man
- Om Shivpuri as Mr. Kapoor
- Sulochana Latkar as Salma, Jaanu's Mother
- Raj Mehra
- Paintal as Nandu, Ballu's Friend
- Jagdish Raj as I.G.P Nath
- Sajjan as Sandeep Narayan ,Sheela's Servant
- Pinchoo Kapoor as Mr Dwarka Singh
- Chand Usmani as Mrs Ranjana Singh

== Soundtrack ==
Lyrics: Anjaan

Song	Singer
"Peechha Tera Chhodunga Na"	Kishore Kumar, Asha Bhosle
"Piya Bina Jal Rahi Hai Yahan"	S. Janaki
"O Baba O Baba"	Asha Bhosle
"Bareba Bareba"	Asha Bhosle
"Banu Ko Mil Gaya Janu, Janu Ko Mil Gayi Banu, Nachenge Gayenge Hum Raatbhar Jhumke"	Asha Bhosle, Vijay Benedict, Manhar Udhas
