= Painter Babu =

- Directed by: Ashok V. Bhushan
- Produced by: Manoj Kumar
- Starring: Rajiv Goswami; Meenakshi Sheshadri; Neelima Azeem
- Music by: Uttam-Jagdish
- Release date: 31 May 1983 (India)
- Running time: 149 mins
- Country: India
- Language: Hindi

Painter Babu is a 1983 Indian Hindi-language drama film directed by Ashok V. Bhushan, starring Rajiv Goswami, Meenakshi Sheshadri (debut) and Neelima in lead roles.

== Cast ==
- Rajiv Goswami
- Meenakshi Sheshadri
- Neelima
- Rakesh Bedi

== Soundtrack ==
Uttam-Jagdish composed the music, to lyrics written by Manoj Kumar.

1. "Painter Babu I Love You" - Kishore Kumar, Lata Mangeshkar
2. "Kab Talak Shama Jali Yaad Nahin" - Lata Mangeshkar, Mahendra Kapoor
