= R. D. Burman filmography =

The following is a select filmography of films for which Rahul Dev Burman (27 June 1939 – 4 January 1994), also known as R. D. Burman, composed the soundtracks. He was one of the most prolific Indian movie score / soundtrack composers of the Indian film industry:

== Bengali cinema ==
Year	Movie	Songs	Notes
1970	Rajkumari	"All songs"	Debut in Bengali cinema
1981	Anusandhan	"All songs"	Simultaneously made in Hindi as Barsaat Ki Ek Raat
1981	Kalankini Kankabati	"All songs"	
1982	Shoukheeen	"All songs"	
1982	Aparupa	"All songs"	
1982	Troyee	"All songs"	
1984	Teen Murti	"All songs"	Simultaneously made in Hindi as Jagir
1985	Anyay Abichar	"All songs"	Simultaneously made in Hindi as Aar Paar
1987	Ekanto Apon	"All songs"	
1988	Aagoon	"All songs"	
1989	Aakrosh	"All songs"	
1989	Jhankar	"All songs"	
1989	Shatarupa	"All songs"	
1990	Apon Amar Apon	"All songs"	
1990	Ekhane Aamar Swarga	"All songs"	
1990	Lorai	"All songs"	
1990	Andha Bichar	"All songs"	Simultaneously made in Hindi as Dushman
1991	Ananda Niketan	"All songs"	
1991	Bourani	"All songs"	
1991	Krodhi	"All songs"	
1991	Debota	"All songs"	
1991	Ahankar	"All songs"	
1991	Nabab	"All songs"	
1992	Maa	"All songs"	Simultaneously made in Odia under the same title
1992	Puroshkar	"All songs"	
1992	Shwet Pathorer Thala	"All songs"	
1992	Purushottam	"All songs"	Simultaneously made in Odia as Baadshah
1992	Adhikaar	"All songs"	
1993	Shesh Cheethi	"All songs"	
1993	Shraddhanjali	"All songs"	
1994	Ajana Path	"All songs"	
1994	Birodh	"All songs"	Dubbed version of Shatru
1995	Kalidas	"All songs"	

== Hindi cinema ==
=== 1960s ===
Year	Movie
1961	Chhote Nawab
1965	Bhoot Bungla
1965	Teesra Kaun
1966	Pati Patni
1966	Teesri Manzil
1967	Chandan Ka Palna
1967	Baharon Ke Sapne
1968	Padosan
1968	Abhilasha
1969	Pyar Ka Mausam
1969	Waris

=== 1970s ===
Year	Film
1970	Saas Bhi Kabhi Bahu Thi
1970	Raaton Ka Raja
1970	Puraskar
1970	The Train
1971	Kati Patang
1971	Paraya Dhan
1971	Mela
1971	Lakhon Me Ek
1971	Hulchul
1971	Caravan
1971	Buddha Mil Gaya
1971	Adhikar
1971	Pyar Ki Kahani
1971	Hungama
1972	Hare Rama Hare Krishna
1972	Sanjog
1972	Amar Prem
1972	Shehzada
1972	Seeta Aur Geeta
1972	Savera
1972	Samadhi
1972	Rakhi Aur Hathkadi
1972	Parchhaiyan
1972	Mere Jeevan Saathi
1972	Garam Masala
1972	Double Cross
1972	Rani Mera Nam
1972	Do Chor
1972	Dil Ka Raaja
1972	Apna Desh
1972	Bombay To Goa
1972	Jawani Diwani
1972	Raampur Ka Lakshman
1972	Parichay
1972	Gomti Ke Kinare
1973	Yaadon Ki Baaraat
1973	Shareef Budmaash
1973	Bada Kabutar
1973	Heera Panna
1973	Bandhe Hath
1973	Anamika
1973	Raja Rani
1973	Jheel Ke Us Paar
1973	Joshila
1973	Aa Gale Lag Jaa
1973	Namak Haraam
1973	Rickshawala
1973	Jaise Ko Taisa
1973	Do Phool
1973	Hifazat
1974	Khote Sikkay
1974	Zehreela Insaan
1974	Ishq Ishq Ishq
1974	Mr. Romeo
1974	Imaan
1974	Humshakal
1974	Goonj
1974	Charitraheen
1974	Manoranjan
1974	Aap Ki Kasam
1974	Doosri Sita
1974	Dil Diwana
1974	Ajnabee
1974	Benaam
1974	Shaitaan
1974	Phir Kab Milogi
1974	Madhosh
1975	Raaja
1975	Mazaaq
1975	Khel Khel Mein
1975	Kahte Hain Mujhko Raja
1975	Deewaar
1975	Warrant
1975	Aandhi
1975	Khushboo
1975	Kaala Sona
1975	Sholay
1975	Dharam Karam
1976	Nehle Peh Dehlaa
1976	Maha Chor
1976	Bundalbaaz
1976	Balika Badhu
1976	Mehbooba
1976	Khalifa
1977	Bullet
1977	Karm
1977	Darling Darling
1977	Chandi Sona
1977	Chalta Purza
1977	Mukti
1977	Hum Kisise Kum Naheen
1977	Chala Murari Hero Banne
1977	Kitaab
1977	Kinara
1978	Heeralaal Pannalaal
1978	Ghar
1978	Kasme Vaade
1978	Bhola Bhala
1978	Naukri
1978	Azaad
1978	Phandebaaz
1978	Devata
1978	Shalimar
1979	Bhala Maanus
1979	Salaam Memsaab
1979	Hamare Tumhare
1979	Jhoota Kahin Ka
1979	Gol Maal
1979	Jurmana
1979	Dhongee
1979	Manzil
1979	Nauker
1979	The Great Gambler

=== 1980s ===
Year	Movie
1980	Katil Kaun?
1980	Khubsoorat
1980	Abdullah
1980	Alibaba Aur 40 Chor
1980	The Burning Train
1980	Dhan Daulat
1980	Red Rose
1980	Phir Wahi Raat
1980	Sitara
1980	Aanchal
1980	Shaan
1981	Bulundi
1981	Love Story
1981	Barsaat Ki Ek Raat
1981	Naram Garam
1981	Kudrat
1981	Rocky
1981	Harjaee
1981	Baseraa
1981	Jail Yatra
1981	Ghungroo Ki Awaaz
1981	Kaalia
1982	Zamaane Ko Dikhana Hai
1982	Namkeen
1982	Angoor
1982	Satte Pe Satta
1982	Bemisal
1982	Yeh Vaada Raha
1982	Daulat
1982	Teri Kasam
1982	Amne Samne
1982	Sanam Teri Kasam
1982	Ashanti
1982	Shakti
1982	Swami Dada
1983	Lovers
1983	Pukar
1983	Masoom
1983	Rang Birangi
1983	Mahaan
1983	Betaab
1983	Bade Dilwala
1983	Mazdoor
1983	Qayamat
1983	Romance
1983	Jaane Jaan
1983	Agar Tum Na Hote
1984	Anand Aur Anand
1984	Boxer
1984	Sunny
1984	Andar Baahar
1984	Yeh Desh
1984	Maati Maangey Khoon
1984	Duniya
1984	Manzil Manzil
1984	Awaaz
1984	Jawaani
1984	Farishta
1984	Jhutha Sach
1984	Karishmaa
1984	Jagir
1984	Zameen Aasmaan
1985	Rahi Badal Gaye
1985	Ram Tere Kitne Nam
1985	Hum Dono
1985	Ek Se Bhale Do
1985	Lava
1985	Zabardast
1985	Sitamgar
1985	Saagar
1985	Alag Alag
1985	Oonche Log
1985	Awara Baap
1985	Arjun
1985	Hum Naujawan
1985	Shiva Ka Insaaf
1985	Aar Paar
1986	Ek Main Aur Ek Tu
1986	Jeeva
1986	Shatru
1986	Anokha Rishta
1986	Palay Khan
1986	Samundar
1986	Saveraywali Gaadi
1987	Inaam Dus Hazaar
1987	Ijaazat
1987	Hifazat
1987	Dacait
1987	Apne Apne
1987	Jallianwala Bagh
1988	Mardonwali Baat
1988	Zalzala
1988	Libaas
1988	Rama O Rama
1988	Namumkin
1989	Mil Gayee Manzil Mujhe
1989	Joshilaay
1989	Dost
1989	Aag Se Khelenge
1989	Parinda

=== 1990-1993 ===
Year	Film
1990	Bahurani
1990	Jeene Do
1990	Dushman
1991	Indrajeet
1992	Jhoothi Shaan
1992	Siyasat
1992	Sarphira
1992	Khule-Aam
1992	Drohi
1993	Aaja Meri Jaan
1993	Gardish
1993	Gurudev
1993	Tum Karo Vaada

=== Posthumous releases: 1994-present ===
- 1994: Janam Se Pehle
- 1994: Professor Ki Padosan
- 1994: 1942 (Won "Best Music Director" Award)
- 1996: Sautela Bhai
- 1996: Ghatak
- 1997: Anyay Hi Anyay
- 1999: Zulmi (Only 1 song)
- 2000: Gang (Only 1 song)
- 2008: Yaar Meri Zindagi (Won 48th award)

== Tamil cinema ==
R.D. Burman composed music for the following Tamil movies.

- 1987: Poo Mazhai Pozhiyuthu
- 1988: Chutti Poonai
- 1990: Ulagam Pirandhadhu Enakkaga

== Telugu cinema ==
R.D. Burman also composed music for the following 2 Telugu cinema releases of the Tollywood film industry:

- 1988: Chinni Krishnudu
- 1990: Antham

== Unreleased songs ==
Not Available (1974)

- "Happy Christmas To You" - Kishore Kumar, Lata Mangeshkar
- "Sab Se Pehle Sab Se Aakhir, Loon Main Tera Naam, Hey Ram" - Lata Mangeshkar, Mohammed Rafi

Aar Paar 2 (1978)

- "Humse Ka Puchhat Ho Bhai" - Kishore Kumar

Bebus (1978)

- "Pyaar Jab Kiya To" - Kishore Kumar, Asha Bhosle

Kharidaar (1978)

#	Track	Singer
1	"Chandi Ki Chamak Se Gheere Huye Insaanon Ka Kya Kehna"	Kishore Kumar
2	"Ho Aaj Tujhe Aisa Main Jalwa Dikhaoongi"	Asha Bhosle
3	"Na Jaa Re Na Jaa Mere Saawariya"	Lata Mangeshkar

Devdas (1978)

- "Kuhu Kuhu Koyaliya" - Lata Mangeshkar
- "Sehma Sehma Dara Sa" - Bhupinder Singh

Mezaan (1978)

#	Track	Singer
1	"Dil Hai Tera Ghar"	Asha Bhosle, Hariharan
2	"Gussa Ho Kar"	Asha Bhosle, Amit Kumar, R. D. Burman
3	"Koi Dil Ka Haal Na Jaane"	Asha Bhosle, Hariharan
4	"Maula Mohabbat Wale"	Mohammed Aziz, Chandrashekhar Gadgil

Mr Hasmukh (1978)

- "Jo Hoga Dekha Jaayega Aao Hum Tum Pyar Karein" - Kishore Kumar, Asha Bhosle

Nazrana (1978)

- "Ek Roz Mujhe Poochha Kisine" - Asha Bhosle

Production No. 1 (1978)

- "Are Aao Dekho Dekho" - Lata Mangeshkar

Sone Ki Lanka (1978)

#	Track	Singer(s)
1	"Aaya Hoon Taqdeer Banane"	Manna Dey
2	"Ankhiyaan Barse"	Suman Kalyanpur
3	"Tasveer Liye Jaata Hoon"	Mohammed Rafi

Khwaaish (1980)

- "Jab Se Basa Hai Dil Mein Tu Kaisa Kiya Hai Jaadu" - Kishore Kumar, Asha Bhosle
- "Shaam Se Aankh Mein" - Lata Mangeshkar

Not Available (1980)

- "Haan Haan Aaj Main Kuch Kehenewala Hoon" - Mohammed Rafi, Lata Mangeshkar

Reshma O Reshma (1980)

- "Khushi Key Saath Chale" - Lata Mangeshkar, Usha Mangeshkar
- "Le Chal Kahin Mujhko" - Asha Bhosle

Dushman Dost (1981)

#	Track	Singer
1	"Ladki Nahin Bijli Hai Tu"	Kishore Kumar
2	"Main Hoon Woh Jaadugar"	Kishore Kumar, Asha Bhosle, Mohammed Rafi
3	"Main Wohi Hoon"	Asha Bhosle
4	"Meri Behna Pyari Hai"	Asha Bhosle, Manna Dey, Padmini Kolhapure, Shivangi Kolhapure
5	"Mohabbat Key Isharon Mein"	Lata Mangeshkar
6	"Pardesi Behna"	Asha Bhosle

Abhi Abhi (1984)

#	Track	Singer
1	"Jaane Tum Kaun Ho"	Lata Mangeshkar
2	"Aaj Ki Rajat Na Guzre"	Lata Mangeshkar, Shabbir Kumar

Sab Se Bada Paap (1984)

- "Shyam Suno Meri Binati" - Asha Bhosle
- "Teri Nazar Meri Nazar" - Asha Bhosle, Mohammed Aziz

Jab Pyar Humari (1985)

- "Is Duniya Mrinmoy The" - Kishore Kumar, Asha Bhosle

Jaan-E-Jaana (1988)

#	Track	Singer
1	"Hum Garibon Ka Bhi Guzara Ho Jaaye"	Kishore Kumar
2	"Pyar Se Jo Ek Baar Dekh Le Jee UtheMarne Wala"	Kishore Kumar
3	"Tu Na Milan To	Asha Bhosle

Tadap Aisi Bhi Hoti Hain (1988)

#	Track	Singer
1	"Jise Pyaar Zamaana"	Lata Mangeshkar, Amit Kumar
2	"Tadap Jeene Nahin Deti"	Asha Bhosle, Amit Kumar, Sadhana Sargam
3	"Bhool Ja Duniya Ko"	Asha Bhosle, Shailendra Singh
4	"Yaaron Zara Tham Ke"	Asha Bhosle, Shailendra Singh
5	"Ishq Mein Jab Hum"	Asha Bhosle
6	"Tumhare Roop Ka Suraj"	Amit Kumar, Suresh Wadkar, Meenakshi Sheshadri

Zanjeeren (1988)

- "Diya Diya Dil Diya" - Kavita Krishnamurthy

Jeevan Saat Suron Ka Sangam (1989)

- "Ganga Jamuna Se Door" - Sadhana Sargam
- "Yeh Jeevan Saat During Ka Sangam" - Kumar Sanu

Time Limit (1989)

- "Aji Ruko To Zara" - Amit Kumar, Asha Bhosle
- "Barso Re Barso Re" - Anuradha Paudwal, Shailendra Singh
- "Pinky Darling" - Amit Kumar
