= Rishi Kapoor filmography =

List of films

Rishi Kapoor (born as Rishi Raj Kapoor; 4 September 1952 – 30 April 2020) was an Indian actor, film director, and producer. Kapoor was considered one of the finest actors of Bollywood, as well as one of the most successful, with a career spanning 50 years. Kapoor was named Indian cinema's first chocolate boy for his young, handsome, boyish looks through the 70s , 80s And 90s . He mainly starred in romantic films, transitioning to character roles in the 2000s.

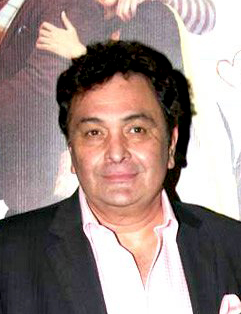
Rishi Kapoor.

At the age of 3, Kapoor had his first film appearance in his father Raj Kapoor's film Shree 420, appearing for a short sequence in the song "Pyar Hua Iqrar Hua". Kapoor then, as a teenager, played his father's younger character in the film Mera Naam Joker. He had his debut as an adult in Raj Kapoor's Bobby, seen alongside actress Dimple Kapadia, who also debuted in the film. He was included in more of his father's works, such as Raj Kapoor's Prem Rog alongside co-star Padmini Kolhapure and Henna (though credited under Randhir Kapoor's name due to Raj Kapoor's death mid-progress) with the Pakistani actress Zeba Bakhtiar (who had her debut in Indian cinema through this film).

Kapoor proved himself a bankable star after the massive success of Harnam Singh Rawail's Laila Majnu, in which he worked alongside Ranjeeta Kaur. He met his wife, actress Neetu Singh, while working on Puttanna Kanagal's Zehreela Insaan. They then collaborated on multiple films throughout the 1970s, including Khel Khel Mein, Rafoo Chakkar, Zinda Dil, Kabhi Kabhie, Amar Akbar Anthony, Doosara Aadmi, Anjane Mein, Jhoota Kahin Ka, Duniya Meri Jeb Mein and Dhan Daulat. They joined the screen together once more in the 2000s with Love Aaj Kal, Do Dooni Chaar, Jab Tak Hai Jaan, and Besharam. His only film as a debut director was Aa Ab Laut Chalen, which was a failure at the box office.

Rishi Kapoor, aside from Neetu Singh, had famous pairings with other actresses, such as Dimple Kapadia, former actress Tina Ambani (née Munim) and Padmini Kolhapure, throughout the 80s, and Sridevi, throughout the late 80s and 90s. He worked opposite Dimple Kapadia in a total of five films, namely Bobby, Saagar, Ajooba, Pyaar Mein Twist and Patiala House. He worked opposite Tina Munim in six movies: Karz, Yeh Vaada Raha, Bade Dilwala, Katilon Ke Kaatil, Aap Ke Deewane and Deedar-E-Yaar. He worked opposite Padmini Kolhapure in Prem Rog, Zamaane Ko Dikhana Hai, Pyar Ke Kabil, Rahi Badal Gaye and Yeh Ishq Nahin Aasaan. He worked opposite Sridevi in Nagina, Chandni, Banjaran, Kaun Sachcha Kaun Jhootha and Gurudev.

Kapoor's last film appearance was in Hitesh Bhatia's Sharmaji Namkeen. Kapoor succumbed to a 2-year battle with leukemia on April 30, 2020, aged 67. The remaining scenes were completed by Paresh Rawal. The film was released posthumously on March 31, 2022.

== Filmography ==
Year	Title	Role	Notes	Ref.
1955	Shree 420	Himself	Child artist; Guest appearance in song "Pyar Hua Iqrar Hua"	
1970	Mera Naam Joker	Young Raju	Child artist	
1973	Bobby	Raj Nath "Raja"		
1974	Zehreela Insaan	Arjun Singh		
1975	Khel Khel Mein	Ajay Anand		
1975	Rafoo Chakkar	Dev		
1975	Zinda Dil	Arun Sharma		
1975	Raaja	Raaja / Inspector Ram (Note: Kapoor played two characters.)	Double Role	
1976	Kabhie Kabhie	Vikram Khanna "Vicky"		
1976	Laila Majnu	Qais Al-Amri / Majnu		
1976	Rangila Ratan	Ratan / Kishan / Gopal		
1976	Barood	Anup D. Saxena (Pappu)		
1976	Ginny Aur Johnny	Himself	Cameo	
1977	Amar Akbar Anthony	Akbar Illhabadi		
1977	Hum Kisise Kum Naheen	Rajesh		
1977	Doosra Aadmi	Karan Saxena		
1977	Chala Murari Hero Banne	Himself	Cameo	
1978	Naya Daur	Mahesh Chopra		
1978	Badaltey Rishtey	Manohar Dhani		
1978	Anjane Mein	Raja		
1978	Phool Khile Hain Gulshan Gulshan	Vishal Rai		
1978	Pati Patni Aur Woh	Singer	Guest appearance song "Tere Naam Tere Naam - Dil Karta Hai Ke Dil..."	
1979	Sargam	Raju		
1979	Jhoota Kahin Ka	Ajay Rai		
1979	Duniya Meri Jeb Mein	Vishal Khanna		
1979	Salaam Memsaab	Ramesh	Cameo	
1980	Do Premee	Chetan Prakash		
1980	Dhan Daulat	Lucky R. Saxena		
1980	Aap Ke Deewane	Ram		
1980	Karz	Monty Oberoi		
1980	Gunahgaar	Amar		
1980	Ek Do Teen Chaar			
1981	Naseeb	Sunny		
1981	Biwi-O-Biwi	Hotel singer	Cameo	
1982	Yeh Vaada Raha	Vikram Rai Bahadur		
1982	Katilon Ke Kaatil	Ashok / Munna		
1982	Zamaane Ko Dikhana Hai	Ravi Nanda		
1982	Prem Rog	Devdhar (Dev)		
1982	Deedar-E-Yaar	Javed Sayeed Ali Khan		
1983	Bade Dilwala	Amrit Saxena/ Vijay Gupta		
1983	Coolie	Sunny		
1983	Naukar Biwi Ka	Himself	Cameo	
1984	Aan Aur Shaan	Vijay Singh		
1984	Duniya	Ravi Kumar		
1984	Yeh Ishq Nahin Aasaan	Salim Ahmed Salim		
1985	Zamana	Ravi S. Kumar		
1985	Tawaif	Dawood Mohammed Ali Khan Yusuf Zahir		
1985	Rahi Badal Gaye	Amar Lal / Pawan Kumar Saxena		
1985	Sitamgar	Jai Kumar		
1985	Saagar	Ravi		
1985	Ram Tere Kitne Nam	Himself	Cameo	
1986	Pahunche Huwey Log	Himself	Cameo	
1986	Allah Rakha	Himself	Cameo	
1986	Ek Chadar Maili Si	Mangal		
1986	Dosti Dushmani	Prakash		
1986	Nagina	Rajiv		
1986	Naseeb Apna Apna	Kishan Singh		
1987	Pyar Ke Kabil	Amar Kapoor		
1987	Hawalaat	Shyam		
1987	Khudgarz	Singing Tramp	Cameo	
1987	Khazana	Singer	Cameo	
1987	Sindoor	Kumar	Cameo	
1987	Raj Kapoor	Himself	Documentary	
1988	Ghar Ghar Ki Kahani	Ram		
1988	Vijay	Vikram Bhardwaj		
1988	Janam Janam	Sunil/ Vinay		
1988	Hamara Khandaan	Vishal		
1988	Akarshan	Himself	Cameo	
1989	Bade Ghar Ki Beti	Gopal		
1989	Paraya Ghar	Arun		
1989	Khoj	Ravi Kapoor		
1989	Chandni	Rohit Gupta		
1989	Naqab	Imran		
1989	Hathyar	Samiullah Khan		
1989	Gharana	Vijay Mehra		
1989	Nigahen	Rajiv	Cameo	
1990	Amiri Garibi	Deepak Bhardwaj		
1990	Azaad Desh Ke Gulam	Vijay Shrivastav		
1990	Sher Dil	Sanjay Saxena		
1990	Sheshnaag	Bhola		
1991	Ajooba	Hassan		
1991	Henna	Chandar Prakash		
1991	Ranbhoomi	Bhola		
1991	Banjaran	Kumar Singh/Suraj		
1991	Ghar Parivar	Birju		
1992	Kasak	Vijay		
1992	Inteha Pyar Ki	Rohit Shankar Walia		
1992	Deewana	Ravi		
1992	Bol Radha Bol	Kishan Malhotra / Tony	Double Role	
1992	Honeymoon	Suraj Verma		
1992	Rishta To Ho Aisa	Vijay		
1993	Shreemaan Aashique	Dushant Kumar Mehra		
1993	Damini	Shekhar Gupta		
1993	Izzat Ki Roti	Krishna		
1993	Anmol	Prem		
1993	Gurudev	Inspector Dev Kumar		
1993	Sahibaan	Gopi		
1993	Sadhna	Karan		
1993	Dhartiputra	Shiva	Cameo	
1994	Saajan Ka Ghar	Amar Khanna		
1994	Pehla Pehla Pyar	Raj		
1994	Mohabbat Ki Arzoo	Raja		
1994	Eena Meena Deeka	Indar "Eena"		
1994	Prem Yog	Yuvraaj		
1994	Ghar Ki Izzat	Mohan Kumar		
1995	Saajan Ki Baahon Mein	Sagar		
1995	Hum Dono	Rajesh		
1995	Yaraana	Raj		
1996	Prem Granth	Somen		
1996	Daraar	Raj Malhotra		
1997	Kaun Sachcha Kaun Jhootha	CBI Officer Karan		
1999	Jai Hind	Gulroz		
2000	Karobaar	Amar Saxena / Rohit Sinha		
2000	Raju Chacha	Siddhant Rai		
2001	Kuch Khatti Kuch Meethi	Raj Khanna		
2002	Yeh Hai Jalwa	Rajesh Mittal		
2003	Kucch To Hai	Bakshi		
2003	Tehzeeb	Anwar Jamaal		
2003	Love at Times Square	Satellite Channel CEO	Cameo	
2004	Hum Tum	Arjun Kapoor		
2005	Pyaar Mein Twist	Yash Khurana		
2006	Fanaa	Zulfikar Ali Beg		
2006	Love Ke Chakkar Mein	Armaan Kochar		
2007	Namastey London	Manmohan		
2007	Om Shanti Om	Himself	Cameo	
2007	Don't Stop Dreaming	Groovy	English film	
2007	Sambar Salsa	Om Suri	English film	
2008	Thoda Pyaar Thoda Magic	God	Cameo	
2008	Halla Bol	Himself	Cameo	
2009	Luck by Chance	Romi Rolly		
2009	Delhi-6	Ali Beg		
2009	Kal Kissne Dekha	Siddharth Verma		
2009	Love Aaj Kal	Veer Singh Panesar		
2009	Chintu Ji	Chintuji		
2010	Sadiyaan	Rajveer Singh		
2010	Do Dooni Chaar	Santosh Duggal		
2011	Patiala House	Gurtej Singh Kahlon		
2011	Tell Me O Kkhuda	Altaf Zardari		
2012	Agneepath	Rauf Lala		
2012	Housefull 2	Chintu Kapoor		
2012	Student of the Year	Yoginder Vashisht		
2012	Jab Tak Hai Jaan	Imraan Sharqazi	Cameo	
2013	Chashme Buddoor	Joseph Furtado		
2013	Aurangzeb	DCP Ravikant Phogat		
2013	D-Day	Iqbal Seth		
2013	Shuddh Desi Romance	Goyal		
2013	Besharam	Chulbul Chautala		
2014	Bewakoofiyaan	V. K. Sehgal		
2014	Kaanchi: The Unbreakable	Jumar B. Kakda		
2015	All Is Well	Bhajanlal Bhalla		
2015	Wedding Pullav	Luv Kapoor	Cameo	
2016	Chalk N Duster	Host Of The Quiz Contest	Cameo	
2016	Sanam Re	Daddu		
2016	Kapoor & Sons	Amarjeet Kapoor		
2017	Patel Ki Punjabi Shaadi	Guggi Tandon		
2018	102 Not Out	Babulal Vakharia		
2018	Manto	Producer		
2018	Mulk	Murad Ali Mohammed		
2018	Rajma Chawal	Raj Mathur		
2019	Jhootha Kahin Ka	Yograj Singh		
2019	The Body	SP Jairaj Rawal		
2022	Sharmaji Namkeen	Brij Gopal Sharma "Sharmaji"	Posthumous release	

== Director ==
Year	Title	Ref.
1999	Aa Ab Laut Chalen	

== Television ==
Year	Title	Role	Notes
2023	The Romantics	Himself	Posthumous release

== Bibliography ==
- Kapoor, Rishi; Iyer, Meena (2017). Khullam Khulla: Rishi Kapoor Uncensored. HarperCollins. ISBN 978-93-5264-302-8.
- Rajadhyaksha, Ashish; Willemen, Paul (1998) [1994]. Encyclopaedia of Indian Cinema (PDF). New Delhi: Oxford University Press. ISBN 0-19-563579-5.
