= Satyen Kappu =

Indian actor (1931–2007)

- Kappu in 1970
- Born: Satyendra Sharma; 7 February 1931; Panipat, Punjab, British India (present-day Haryana, India)
- Died: 27 October 2007 (aged 76); Mumbai, Maharashtra, India
- Years active: 1952–2007

Signature
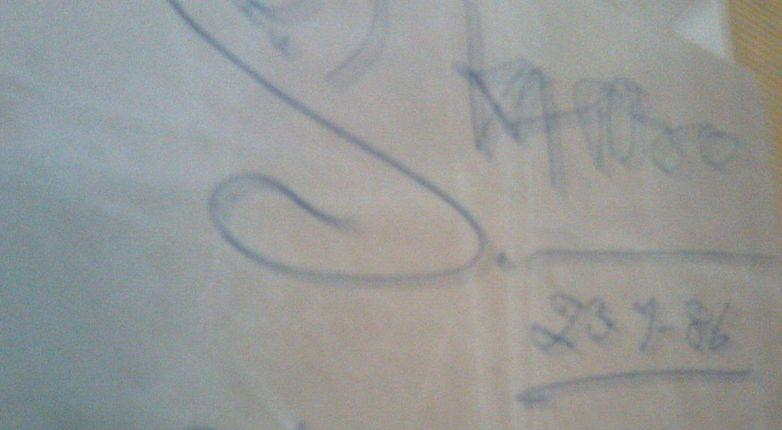

Satyendra Kappu (born Satyendra Sharma; also credited as Satyen Kappu; 7 February 1931 – 27 October 2007), was an Indian character actor in Bollywood films. He has acted in 390 films. His most remembered role is Ramlal in the movie Sholay (1975) and as Amitabh Bachchan's father in Yash Chopra's Deewaar. His other notable films are Kati Patang, Anuraag, Amar Prem, Yaadon Ki Baraat, Khote Sikkay, Don, Chhoti Bahu, Benaam, Zanjeer, Avishkaar, Majboor, Namak Halaal, Kaala Patthar, Angaaray, Mr. Natwarlal, Red Rose, Naya Kadam and Aaj Ka M.L.A. Ram Avtar.

== Career ==
Satyen Kappu started his career as a stage actor in 1952 with the Indian People's Theatre Association (IPTA) in Bombay (present-day Mumbai). His career spanned from the early 1960s to the early 2000s with over 390 films to his credit. He mostly played supporting roles of a father, relative, uncle, police officer, doctor and villainous roles. He worked in many films with leading actors such as Rajesh Khanna, Amitabh Bachchan, Jeetendra, Mithun Chakraborty in the golden years of hindi cinema and were noteworthy.

He was a resident of Sunder Nagar, Mumbai. He died on 27 October 2007 in Mumbai following a cardiac arrest at the age of 76.

== Filmography ==
Year	Title	Role	Notes
1961	Kabuliwala	Manoj Mukherjee	
1962	Prem Patra	Aslam	
1963	Bandini		
1965	Noor Mahal	Actor	Uncredited
1965	Dak Ghar	Madho	
1965	Boxer		
1967	Samay Varte Savdhaan		
1968	Lady Killer		
1968	Sapno Ka Saudagar	Peter D'Souza	Uncredited
1969	Bahurooopi		
1969	Badmaash		
1970	Khilona	Public Prosecutor	
1970	Kati Patang	Dr. Kashinath	
1971	Ghunghat		
1971	Jaane-Anjaane	Ramu's lawyer	
1971	Chhoti Bahu	Vedji Avtar	
1971	Rakhwala	Police Inspector	Uncredited
1971	Lal Patthar	Tourist / Narrator	
1971	Balidaan	Police Commissioner	
1972	Naag Panchami	Vishwavardhan	
1972	Amar Prem	Vijay	
1972	Jawani Diwani	Mamaji	
1972	Seeta Aur Geeta	Badrinath	
1972	Raaste Kaa Patthar	Mr. Kapoor	
1972	Anuraag	Dr. Sunil	
1972	Savera		
1972	Ek Khilari Bawan Pattey	Inspector	
1972	Do Gaz Zameen Ke Neeche		
1972	Babul Ki Galiyaan	Mill Owner	
1972	Apna Desh	Chanda's Brother	
1973	Aakrant		
1973	Anhonee	Manager	
1973	Zanjeer	Police Inspector	
1973	Yaadon Ki Baaraat	Jack	
1973	Keemat	Inspector Deshpande	
1973	Hindustan Ki Kasam		
1973	Hanste Zakhm	Inspector Kumar	
1973	Gaddar	Dr. Mathur	
1974	Ghatna		
1974	Aarop	Advocate Desai	
1974	Khhotte Sikkay	Judge	
1974	Dost	Father Rebello	
1974	Aap Ki Kasam	Dr. Harish	Uncredited
1974	Doosri Sita	Advocate Sahay	
1974	Kasauti	Sapna's foster father	
1974	Haath Ki Safai	Usmanbhai Bombay	
1974	Avishkaar	Taxi-driver	
1974	Bidaai	Prabhakar / Parvati's husband	
1974	Benaam	Inspector Jadhav	
1974	Majboor	Narendra Sinha	
1974	Shatranj Ke Mohre		
1974	Imaan	Sadhu Ram	
1974	Dil Diwana	Jamal Khan	
1974	Alingan		
1975	Deewaar	Anand Verma – Father	
1975	Andhera	Sharaafat	
1975	Dharmatma	Anokhelal's brother	
1975	Qaid	Inspector L.G. Kaushik	
1975	Pratiggya	Inspector D'Souza	
1975	Kala Sona	Police Officer	
1975	Sholay	Ramlal	
1975	Mausam		
1975	Rani Aur Lalpari	Ramlal	
1975	Mutthi Bhar Chawal		
1975	Khel Khel Mein	Lecturer	
1975	Dhoti Lota Aur Chowpatty		
1975	Aakhri Daao	Reena's dad	
1976	Khaan Dost	Jailor Sharma	
1976	Fakira	School Master	
1976	Udhar Ka Sindur	Bishambernath	
1976	Zamane Se Poocho		
1976	Santaan	Sita Ram	
1976	Sikka		
1976	Sangat		
1976	Sajjo Rani		
1976	Mera Jiwan	Biharilal – Pyarelal	
1976	Maha Chor	Thakur Ajay Singh	
1976	Lagaaam	Gopal	
1976	Jeevan Jyoti	Somnath	
1976	Harfan Maulaa		
1977	Immaan Dharam	Prosecuting Lawyer (in Jamuna Das's Case)	
1977	Dream Girl	Colonel	
1977	Dhoop Chhaon	Dulare	
1977	Doosara Aadmi	Ram Prasad Saxena	
1977	Chala Murari Hero Banne	Dubey / Lyricist	
1977	Jay Vejay	Shambu	
1977	Vishwasghaat	Mack	
1977	Videsh	Robert	
1977	Mari Hel Utaro Raj		
1978	Tyaag Patra		
1978	Namaskar		
1978	Kanchan Ane Ganga		
1978	Vishwanath	D.P. Lal	
1978	Darwaza	Ganga	
1978	Ganga Ki Saugand	Pandit Kashinath	
1978	Bandie	Maharaj Brajbhan Singh	
1978	Bhola Bhala	Mr. Kapoor	
1978	Don	Inspector S. Verma	
1978	Anjane Mein	Manohar Lal	
1978	Phandebaaz	Hukumat Rai	
1978	Saajan Bina Suhagan	Dr. Malhotra	
1978	Kaala Aadmi		
1978	Sawan Ke Geet		
1979	Pehredaar		
1979	Aakhri Kasam	Jagga	
1979	Sarkari Mehmaan		
1979	Jhoota Kahin Ka	Pinto	
1979	Dil Kaa Heera	Satyam Malhotra	
1979	Dhongee	Mr. Kapoor	
1979	Mr. Natwarlal	Mickey	
1979	Kaala Patthar	Raghunath – Miner	
1979	Nalayak	Ram Narayan	
1979	Manzil	Mr. Khosla	
1979	Jaandaar	Pujari	
1979	Dada	Dharamdas	
1979	Kartavya		
1980	Labbaik		
1980	Chunaoti	Thakur Shamsher Singh 'Kaka'	
1980	The Burning Train	Madhu's dad	
1980	Red Rose	Anand's foster father	
1980	Jyoti Bane Jwala	Parvati's husband	
1980	Patthar Se Takkar	Inspector Kulkarni	
1980	Kala Pani		
1981	Sweety		
1981	Waqt Ki Deewar	Anokhilal	
1981	Kudrat	Paro's Father	
1981	Khoon Aur Paani	Shakal	
1981	Naseeb	Lottery winner	
1981	Rocky	Ram Avtar	
1981	Laawaris	Kailash Nath	
1981	Ek Duuje Ke Liye	Jagannath	
1981	Sahhas	Vijay Kumar	
1981	Haqdaar		
1981	Shakka	Satyan	
1981	Shama	Maulvi Karrimudin	
1981	Gehra Zakhm	Swaroopchand Johri	Uncredited
1981	Raksha	Dr. Srivastava	
1981	Professor Pyarelal	Police Commissioner Albert D'Souza	
1981	Main Aur Mera Haathi	Kumar	
1981	Laparwah	Johnny	
1981	Khara Khota		
1982	Prohari		
1982	Do Dishayen		
1982	Teesri Aankh	Kailash Nath	
1982	Namak Halaal	Girdar	
1982	Ashanti	Police Commissioner	
1982	Khud-Daar	Barman	
1982	Dharam Kanta	Harnam Singh	
1982	Teri Maang Sitaron Se Bhar Doon	Anand's Father	
1982	Yeh To Kamaal Ho Gaya	Shankar Chander	
1982	Samraat	Kartar Singh	
1982	Johny I Love You	Inspector Mohan	
1982	Anokha Bandhan		
1982	Taqdeer Ka Badshah	Jailor	
1982	Lubna		
1982	Kanchan Aur Ganga		
1982	Jeeo Aur Jeene Do		
1983	Mangal Pandey	Suraj Singh	Uncredited
1983	Himmatwala	Dharam Murti	
1983	Lovers	Shambu	
1983	Jeet Hamaari	Raju's Father	
1983	Souten		
1983	Jaanejaan	Professor	
1983	Woh Jo Hasina	S.P Anand	
1983	Justice Chaudhury	Dr. Murthy	
1983	Paanchwin Manzil	Badrinarayan Sapru	
1983	Qayamat	Senior Police Inspector	
1983	Pukar	Gopal	
1983	Coolie	Aslam	
1983	Shubh Kaamna	Bansi	
1983	Main Awara Hoon	Dinanath Kumar	
1983	Kaise Kaise Log	Mr. Khanna	
1983	Do Gulab	Steven	
1983	Chor Police	I.G.	
1983	Bekaraar	Ramkumar	
1983	Divorce	Seema's dad	
1984	Aan Aur Shaan	Ram Singh	
1984	Bindiya Chamkegi	SP Ajay Kumar	
1984	Inquilaab	Political Candidate Girdhari Lal	
1984	Yeh Desh	Rehman	
1984	Aaj Ka M.L.A. Ram Avtar	Digvijay Singh	
1984	Baazi	Police Commissioner	
1984	Sharaabi	Seth Govardhandas	
1984	Zameen Aasmaan	Doctor	
1984	Inteha	John – Driver	
1984	Haisiyat		
1984	Laila	Ram Singh	
1984	Duniya	Jagdish	
1984	Sunny	Gopinath	
1984	Naya Kadam	Master Srikant	
1984	Karishmaa	Nisha's Father	
1984	Love Marriage	Monty' Mafatlal	
1984	Yaadon Ki Zanjeer	Jairam – DaulatRam	
1984	Shapath	Police Commissioner	
1984	Mera Faisla	Dhawan	
1984	Kaamyab		
1984	Grahasthi	Col. Verma	
1984	Ek Naya Itihas		
1984	Jamuna Kinare		
1985	Aaj Ka Daur	Mr. Kapoor (Pratap's dad)	
1985	Saaheb	Natasha's Dad	
1985	Mera Jawab	D'Souza	
1985	Zamana	Sheetal's Father	
1985	Sarfarosh	Singer in song 'Yaad Rakhna	
1985	Jawaab	Murthy	
1985	Ramkali	Villager	
1985	Yudh	Jaichand	
1985	Wafadaar	Advocate Mahesh Patel	
1985	Bepanaah	Pratap Narayan – Advocate	
1985	Geraftaar	Mr. Kapil Kumar Khanna	Cameo
1985	Lallu Ram	Bhiku	
1985	Alag Alag	Ramu	
1985	Teri Meherbaniyan	Sunder	
1985	Mard	Jamuna's Husband	
1985	Uyarukm Njan Nadaake		
1985	Phaansi Ke Baad	Sukhdev Walia	
1985	Paisa Yeh Paisa	Professor	
1985	Bond 303	Dr	
1985	Aakhri Chaal		TV movie
1986	Gunehgaar		
1986	Badkaar	SevakRam	
1986	Swarag Se Sunder	Rahim Chacha	
1986	Chameli Ki Shaadi	Bhajandas	
1986	Saveray Wali Gaadi	Guptaji	
1986	Pahunchey Huwe Log		
1986	Tan-Badan	Karim Ali	
1986	Kala Dhanda Goray Log	I.G.P. Shukla	
1986	Muddat	Dayaram	
1986	Pyar Kiya Hai Pyar Karenge	Shobha's dad	
1986	Nasihat	Ratanlal	
1986	Pyaar Ke Do Pal	Viren Thakur	
1986	Asli Naqli	Seth Laxmi Narayan	Uncredited
1986	Naache Mayuri	Govind	
1986	Waapsi		
1986	Sajna Saath Nibhana	Juman	
1986	Palay Khan	Ganga Din	
1986	Naseeb Apna Apna	Ramlal (Chanda's dad)	
1986	Mangal Dada	Police Inspector	
1986	Krishna-Krishna	Prachandev	
1986	Jeeva	Judge	
1986	Inteqam Ki Aag	Police commissioner	
1986	Chhota Aadmi		
1986	Angaarey	Ravi's father	
1987	Kanoon Kanoon Hai		
1987	Anjaam	Ram-dhan	
1987	Imaandaar	Dr. Saxena	
1987	Tera Karam Mera Dharam	champa's Father	
1987	Majaal	The Judge	
1987	Satyamev Jayate	Chandra Prakash	
1987	Muqaddar Ka Faisla	Chaganlal	
1987	Khudgarz	Dayal, Bank Manager	
1987	Kudrat Ka Kanoon	Justice Mathur	
1987	Himmat Aur Mehanat	Madhav – Madan's servant	
1987	Insaaf Ki Pukar	Dada	
1987	Jawab Hum Denge	D.I.G.	
1988	Tamacha	Binu Kaka	
1988	Sagar Sangam	Binu Kaka	
1988	Kasam		
1988	Kab Tak Chup Rahungi	Geeta's Father	
1988	Charnon Ki Saugandh	D.P. Saxena	
1988	Pyaar Ka Mandir	Mr. Kumar, Seen in Only Photoframe	Cameo Role
1988	Khatron Ke Khiladi	Police Inspector Narayan	
1988	Mohabbat Ke Dushman		
1988	Hatya	Father Joseph Sebastian	
1988	Biwi Ho To Aisi	Jagat Dada	
1988	Zakhmi Aurat	Shanti's father	
1988	Agnee	Bhargav	
1988	Qatil	Police Commissioner	
1988	Zalzala	Police Commissioner	
1988	Woh Phir Aayegi	Aarthi's Dad	
1988	Sone Pe Suhaaga	Dinu Kaka	
1988	Pyaar Mohabbat	Chaudhary Gulab Rai	
1988	Mera Shikar	Bijli's Father	
1988	Mar Mitenge	Master Shrikant Verma	
1988	Jeete Hain Shaan Se	Advocate Verma	
1988	Gunahon Ke Shatranj		
1988	Gharwali Baharwali	Hariprasad Dhabawala	
1988	Do Waqt Ki Roti	Dashrath	
1989	Saaya	Defending Lawyer	Uncredited
1989	Guru	Dead in photograph	Uncredited
1989	Aurat Aur Patthar		
1989	Joshilaay	Nathulal	
1989	Farz Ki Jung	Ramdin	
1989	Gair Kanooni	Nathulal	
1989	Touhean	Dr. Chopra	
1989	Anjaane Rishte	Bhushan	
1989	Daata	Barkat	
1989	Jaadugar	Police Commissioner	
1989	Kanoon Apna Apna	Editor Ramprasad	
1989	Tujhe Nahin Chhodunga		
1989	Nache Nagin Gali Gali	Gurudev	
1989	Mohabat Ka Paigham	Dinu	
1989	Khuli Khidki	S.K. Dharampal	
1989	Jaaydaad	Ramu	
1989	Indira	Kishanlal	
1989	Gharana	Rahim	
1989	Ghabrahat		
1990	Baap Numbri Beta Dus Numbri	School Master	
1990	Vidrohi	Colonel Mahendra Pratap Singh	
1990	Vaari Jaaun Balaji		
1990	Kasam Jhoot Ki		
1990	Insaaf Ka Suraj		
1990	Asli Haqdaar		
1990	Aag aur Angaray		
1990	Naaka Bandi	Mehar	
1990	Hum Se Na Takrana	Ramji	
1990	Aandhiyan	Judge	
1990	Dil	Girdharilal	
1990	Deewana Mujh Sa Nahin	Nandkishore Sharma	
1990	Sher Dil	Jweller	
1990	Pyar Ka Devta	Sangeeta's father-in-law	
1990	Kaaranama	Mala's Father	
1990	Jawani Zindabad	Gopinath Srivastav	
1990	Ghar Ho To Aisa	Dwarkaprasad	
1990	Awaaz De Kahan Hai		
1991	Jaan Se Badhkar		
1991	Saugandh	Ganga's father-in-law	
1991	Gunehgar Kaun	SP	
1991	Paap Ki Aandhi	Karim Miyan	
1991	Yeh Aag Kab Bujhegi		
1991	Karz Chukana Hai	Ramnath	
1991	Pratikar	Narayan Srivastav	
1991	Dharam Sankat	Sardar	
1991	Shanti Kranti	Subhash's father	
1991	Phool Aur Kaante	College Principal	
1991	Rupaye Dus Karod	DIG Sharma	
1991	Jhoothi Shaan	Mahindranath	
1991	Qurbani Rang Layegi	Hamid	
1991	Maskari		
1991	Lakhpati	Tanshukhbhai	
1991	Fateh	Maria's dad	
1992	Mangni		
1992	Kasak	Divya's father	
1992	Kabhi Dhoop Kabhi Chhaon		
1992	Apradhini		
1992	Dil Ka Kya Kasoor	Kaka	
1992	Inteha Pyar Ki	Dhanraj	
1992	Khule-Aam	Viasaki Lal	
1992	Ghazab Tamasha		
1992	Khel	Sinha – Orphanage Manager	
1992	Heer Ranjha	Sage	
1992	Sone Ki Lanka	Madhav	
1992	Dil Aashna Hai	Rajlaxmi's dad	
1992	Jeena Marna Tere Sang	Servant	
1992	Naseebwaala	Abdullah	
1992	Beta	Shyamlal	
1993	Tirangaa	Dr. Gupta	
1993	Bira Bego Aaije Re		
1993	Apaatkaal	Doctor Ali	
1993	Insaniyat Ke Devta	Dev Dayal 'Babaji'	
1993	Divya Shakti	Monto	
1993	Muqabla	Suraj's dad	
1993	Sangram	Khuber Singh	
1993	Badi Bahen	Shankar	
1993	Pardesi	Ramprasad	
1993	Gurudev	Satyen – Dev's father	
1993	Dalaal	Minister Chatriprasad	
1993	Santaan	Sita Ram	
1993	Tahqiqaat	Anthony	
1993	Veerta	Jay Prakash	
1993	Sahibaan	Balakram	
1994	Tara Rani Ki Amar Katha		
1994	Kaun Apna Kaun Paraya		
1994	Prem Shakti	Shastriji	
1994	Insaniyat	Editor Tripati	
1994	Brahma	DSP	
1994	Amaanat	Mohan	
1994	Vaade Iraade	Dindayal Sidhu	
1994	Gopi Kishan	Commissioner of Police	
1994	Ghar Ki Izzat	Din Dayal (Sheela's dad)	
1994	Pathreela Raasta		
1995	Ghar Ka Kanoon		
1995	Hathkadi	Mayor Chandraprakash	
1995	Taqdeerwala	Gopal Kaka	
1995	Hum Dono	Kakaji	
1995	Haqeeqat	Chief Minister L.K. Chowdhury	
1995	Trimurti	Peter	
1995	Raja	Doctor	
1995	Paappi Devataa	Niranjan Das	
1995	7 Days		Guest Appearance
1996	Apna Kaun		
1996	Megha	Principal	Uncredited
1996	Jagannath	Dinu Chacha	
1996	Loafer	Speaker P.L. Raghupathi C.M.	
1996	Sautela Bhai	Advocate Surendranath	
1996	Shohrat	Rajeshwar Khanna	
1996	Daanveer	Ramprasad – Anil's dad	
1996	Rangbaaz	Ravi	
1997	Gundagardi		
1997	Mahaanta: The Film	Edward Pinto	
1997	Virasat	Shurkyen	
1997	Mere Sapno Ki Rani	Rajnath Nehle	
1997	Hamesha	Reshma's father	
1997	Ankhon Mein Tum Ho	Public Prosecutor Gupta	
1997	Uff! Yeh Mohabbat	Principal Kapoor	
1997	Dil Ke Jharoke Main	Satya Pratap	
1998	Hatya Kaand		
1998	Daayan		
1998	Hitler	Daulatram	
1998	Vinashak – Destroyer	Mr. Singh	
1998	Main Solah Baras Ki		
1998	Dand Nayak	Principal V.Q. Ahluwala	
1999	Tabaahi-The Destroyer	Digvijay and Vijay's father	
1999	Aadhi Raat		
1999	Anari No. 1	DhanrajSaxena	
1999	Mann	Raj's uncle	
1999	Gair	Judge Amarnath	
1999	Sanyasi Mera Naam		
1999	Sarfarosh-E-Hind	Kamath	
1999	Lohpurush	Ramesh Goel	
2000	Ek Nari Do Roop		
2000	Aaghaat		
2000	Khauff	Dadu	
2000	Kaali Topi Laal Rumaal	Tilu	
2000	Jai Jwala Maa		
2000	Beti No. 1	Priya's dad	
2001	Chhupa Rustam: A Musical Thriller	Sandhya's dad / Satpal's brother	
2002	Rang Mahal		
2002	Akhiyon Se Goli Maare	Magistrate Kapoor	
2003	Raja Bhaiya	Khan chacha	
2004	Jiyo Mhara Lal		
2005	The Film	Guruji	
2006	Sarhad Paar	Taya	(final film role)

=== Television ===
Year	Show	Role	Notes
1987	Katha Sagar	Sadhu	Episode: Teen Sadhu
1990–91	The Sword of Tipu Sultan		
1996–97	Aarohan	Colonel Arun Sachdev	Guest, 1 episode
1997–98	Ghar Jamai	Chandni's Grandfather	Guest, 2 episodes
