= Kanwarjit Paintal =

Indian comic actor

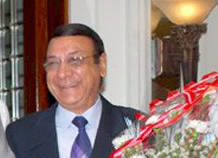
- Paintal in 2009
- Born: Kanwarjit Singh Paintal; 22 August 1948 (age 78); Tarn Taran, East Punjab, India
- Occupation: Actor
- Children: Hiten Paintal
- Relatives: Gufi Paintal (brother)

Kanwarjit Paintal, better known as Paintal (born 22 August 1948), is an Indian actor and comedian. He started off as a comic actor and moved on to teaching the art of acting. He has extensively worked not only in numerous movies but also television. He was born into a Sikh family in Tarn Taran which is near Amritsar, Punjab. He lived his early life with his family members in Sadar Bazaar, Delhi. Paintal learnt acting at the Film and Television Institute of India and in 2008 was the Head of the Acting Department of FTII. He came to Bombay (now Mumbai) in 1969. His brother Gufi Paintal played the role Shakuni in B.R. Chopra hit show 'Mahabharat (1988 TV series)', in which he himself played the roles of Shikhandi and Sudama. His son, Hiten Paintal, is also an actor, who worked in movies such as Dil Maange More (2004) and Bachna Ae Haseeno (2008).

== Filmography ==
Some of Paintal's notable roles included Rattan in Jawani Diwani (1972), Salma in Rafoo Chakkar (1975), Guruji in Bawarchi (1972), Arun in Piya Ka Ghar (1972), Panditji (Astrologer) in Parichay (1972), Totaram in Jangal Mein Mangal (1972), Kamal in Heera Panna (1973), Headmaster in Roti (1974), Ramu in Khote Sikkay (1973), and Budh Anand in Satte Pe Satta (1982). One of his most notable roles was as Champak Boomia in Aaj Ki Taaza Khabar (1973). The film became very successful for the character 'Champak Bhumia' played by him. From playing comic roles, Paintal has moved on to play serious character roles, most recent of which is in the television drama Pyar Ka Dard Hain Kuch Meetha Meetha.

=== Film ===
Year	Film	Role	Notes	Ref.
1970	Umang			
1971	Lal Patthar			
1971	Mere Apne	Bansi		
1972	Tangewala			
1972	Shaadi Ke Baad			
1972	Jawani Diwani	Rattan		
1972	Gomti Ke Kinare			
1972	Bawarchi	Guruji		
1972	Piya Ka Ghar	Arun		
1972	Parichay	Panditji (Astrologer)		
1972	Jangal Mein Mangal	Totaram		
1973	Aaj Ki Taaza Khabar	Champak Boomia		
1973	Khote Sikkay	Ramu		
1974	Heera Panna	Kamal		
1974	Zehreela Insaan			
1974	Us-Paar			
1974	Manoranjan			
1974	Kora Badan			
1974	Faslah			
1974	Dulhan			
1974	Dil Diwana			
1974	Call Girl			
1974	Roti	Headmaster		
1974	Gulabi Nain Sharabi	Raja		
1975	Rafoo Chakkar	Salim / Salma		
1975	Mazaaq			
1975	Jaggu			
1975	Apne Rang hazaar			
1975	Anokha	Raja		
1976	Maa			
1976	Laila Majnu	Jafran		
1976	Deewangee			
1976	Balika Badhu	Shambhu		
1976	Bairaag			
1976	Jaaneman	Mithoo		
1976	Udhar Ka Sindur			
1977	Shirdi Ke Sai Baba			
1977	Saheb Bahadur			
1977	Saal Solvan Chadya			
1977	Jay Vejay	Damak		
1977	Jagriti			
1977	Chandi Sona			
1977	Chala Murari Hero Banne			
1977	Alibaba Marjinaa	Khairu		
1977	Abhi To Jee Lein			
1978	Tumhari Kasam			
1978	Swarg Narak			
1978	Phool Khile Hain Gulshan Gulshan			
1978	Naya Daur	Mangu		
1978	Muqaddar			
1978	Des Pardes			
1978	College Girl			
1978	Ankh Ka Tara			
1978	Aakhri Daku			
1978	Aahuti			
1978	Adventures of Aladdin			
1979	Magroor			
1979	Jaani Dushman			
1979	Jaan-E-Bahaar			
1979	Gopal Krishna			
1979	Duniya Meri Jeb Mein	Bhaskar		
1980	Khoon Kharaba			
1980	The Burning Train	Ticketless Traveler		
1980	Sitara			
1980	Oh Bewafa			
1980	Dostana			
1981	Waqt Ki Deewar			
1981	Saajan Ki Saheli			
1981	Ghamandee			
1981	Kranti	Bharat's Kranti Group Member		
1981	Daasi			
1982	Kachche Heere	Ramu		
1982	Baghavat			
1982	Pyar Ke Rahi	Srikanth Bedhadak		
1982	Satte Pe Satta	Budh Anand		
1982	Teri Kasam			
1982	Teri Maang Sitaron Se Bhar Doon			
1983	Shubh Kaamna			
1983	Ganga Meri Maa			
1983	Sadma			
1983	Daulat Ke Dushman		Special Appearance	
1983	Kalaakaar			
1983	Hamar Bhauji			Bhojpuri film
1984	Waqt Ki Pukar			
1984	Sardaar	Pyare		
1984	Shapath			
1984	Maan Maryada			
1984	Kanoon Meri Mutthi Mein			
1984	Jaag Utha Insaan			
1984	Hum Do Hamare Do	Photographer		
1985	Ram Tere Kitne Nam			
1985	Paisa Yeh Paisa			
1985	Kali Basti			
1985	Aandhi-Toofan			
1985	Mehak			
1985	Wafadaar			
1985	Bepanaah			
1985	Sur Sangam			
1985	Babu			
1985	Mujhe Kasam Hai	Gopi		
1986	Mohabbat Ki Kasam			
1986	Kirayadar			
1986	Adhikar			
1986	Dilwala			
1986	Zindagani			
1986	Teesra Kinara			
1986	Anubhav			
1987	Sheela			
1987	Insaniyat Ke Dushman			
1987	Maashuka			
1988	Paap Ki Duniya			
1988	Jeete Hain Shaan Se			
1988	Akhri Muqabla			
1989	Mitti Aur Sona			
1989	Jaaydaad			
1989	Jaisi Karni Waisi Bharni			
1989	Shehzaade		uncredited	
1989	Anokha Aspatal	Ram Dhani		
1990	Pyasi Nigahen			
1990	Aag Ka Gola		uncredited	
1990	Pyaar Ke Naam Qurban			
1990	Thanedaar			
1991	Qurbani Rang Layegi			
1991	First Love Letter			
1991	Saugandh			
1992	Prem Deewane			
1992	Ghar Jamai	Lakhpathiya		
1992	Mehboob Mere Mehboob			
1993	Pehchaan			
1994	Anokha Premyudh			
1994	Prem Yog			
1994	Amaanat			
1994	Ikke Pe Ikka	Tuli		
1995	Aazmayish			
1995	Rock Dancer	Havaldar		
1996	Aisi Bhi Kya Jaldi Hai			
1996	Megha		uncredited	
1997	Mere Sapno Ki Rani			
1997	Kaalia	Nandlal Choubey		
1998	Hatyara			
1998	Zulm-O-Sitam			
2001	Kasam			
2003	Fun 2shh: Dudes in the 10th Century	Scientist		
2009	Paying Guests			
2009	Shri Chaitanya Mahaprabhu		Special Appearance	
2010	Kaalo			
2016	30 Minutes			
2022	Kahani Rubberband Ki			
2023	Dono			

=== Television ===
Year	Show	Role	Notes	Ref.
1976	Ladoo Singh Taxiwala			
1985	Vikram Aur Betaal	Dagdoo		
1988	Daal Mein Kala	Various		
1988–1990	Mahabharat	Sudama / Shikhandi		
1994	NatKhat			
1999	Jai Mata Ki	Narada		
2001	Ssshhhh...Koi Hai – Bhediya	Madhav	Episode 3	
2001	Ssshhhh...Koi Hai – Khoj	The archeologist	Episode 15	
2003	Pyar Zindagi Hai			
2006	C.I.D	Ghanashyam	Episode 409	
2006–2007	Amber Dhara	Mahendra Pratap Dixit		
2012–2014	Pyaar Ka Dard Hai Meetha Meetha Pyaara Pyaara	Jagdish Prasad Gupta		
2016–2017	Ek Shringaar-Swabhiman	Sujan Singh Chauhan		
2017	Partners Trouble Ho Gayi Double	Himself	Cameo	
2017–2018	Piya Albela	Kashinath Vyas		
2020	Shakti - Astitva Ke Ehsaas Ki	Baksh Singh		
2022	Kabhi Kabhie Ittefaq Sey	Charudutt Kulshresta		
2024	Mehndi Wala Ghar	Hari Agarwal		
2025	Sajan Ji Ghar Aaye Family Kyun Sharmaye	Avdesh Lal		
2025	Anupamaa	Pandit Manohar Sharma		
2026–present	Tu Hi Re Dil Mein	Mr. Patel		

== Awards and nominations ==
Year	Nominee / work	Award	Result
1973	Bawarchi	Filmfare Award for Best Performance in a Comic Role	Won
1978	Chala Murari Hero Banne	Filmfare Award for Best Performance in a Comic Role	Won
