= Kachche Heere =

1981 film

- Theatrical release poster
- Directed by: Narender Bedi
- Written by: Narender Bedi
- Produced by: Netra Pal Singh
- Starring: Feroz Khan; Reena Roy; Danny Denzongpa; Aruna Irani; Shakti Kapoor; Narendra Nath
- Music by: Rahul Dev Burman
- Release date: 12 February 1982
- Country: India
- Language: Hindi

Kachche Heere is a 1982 Hindi-language dacoit Western film directed by Narender Bedi, starring Feroz Khan, Reena Roy, Danny Denzongpa, Aruna Irani, and Shakti Kapoor. It was produced by Netra Pal Singh, with music by Rahul Dev Burman. The film is somewhat a sequel to the 1974 Blockbuster Khote Sikkay; they both have the same star cast and almost the exact story line. (Among the few changes were that Ranjeet was replaced by Shakti Kapoor.) The film was released on 12 February 1982.

== Story ==
The dacoits of Chambal, had some heinous characters like Lukka Singh Thakur, who not only looted, but were party to feuds amongst the ruling class to their own benefit, and one such feud was the killing of Feroz Khan's family as bounty for Kamal Singh Thakur, played by Kamal Kapoor, who supplied arms to the dacoits. After getting his brother killed by dacoits, he wanted to get his nephew sacrificed at the altar of Goddess Durga, the main deity of rural Madhya Pradesh, and hands him over to Dilawar Singh. Dilawar Singh does not kill the child, dissuaded by his wife, who warns him of such Blasphemy, and thus they leave the village to bring up the child as their own, who is no other than Feroz Khan, called Ajnabi, or stranger throughout the movie.

Five petty thieves, Narendra Nath as Jaggu, Danny Denzongpa as Arjun, Shakti Kapoor as Salim, Sudhir (Indian Actor) as Bhaggu and Kanwar Ajit Deol as Tau Pahelwan, loot Prakash Mehra's house as fake Income tax officers, stuff the loot in a red suitcase and hide it underground at a tree in a village, in which they take refuge with the police hot on their heels. Here, they undergo a reformation, seeing the plight of the villagers under the atrocities of dacoit Lukka and his gang played by Dev Kumar.

Feroz Khan is told by Dilawar Singh that he is the real owner of the Thakur properties and gives him a Swastika locket on a neck chain as his family heirloom, as well as telling him that he has hidden the papers related to his real identity in a box, near the same place that the five thieves had hidden their loot.

Along with Feroz Khan, the five friends save the village from Lukka Singh, who is killed in the end. Ganga Aruna Irani forms the love interest of Danny, Rani Reena Roy of Feroz Khan and Komilla Wirk of Tau. Aruna Irani and Shakti Kapoor die in the battle that ensues with the dacoits. The film resolves with Prakash Mehra getting back his wealth and all the friends settled as good citizens under the law, thus showing the various humane angles that reform people.

== Soundtrack ==
Song	Singer
"Haare Na Insaan"	Kishore Kumar
"Kaanta Laago Re"	Lata Mangeshkar
"Mere Jhumke Ke"	Asha Bhosle
"Chadhi Jawaani"	Asha Bhosle

== Cast ==
- Feroz Khan as Horseback Rider
- Reena Roy as Rani
- Danny Denzongpa as Arjun
- Aruna Irani as Ganga
- Shakti Kapoor as Salim
- Sudhir as Bhaggu
- Narendranath as Jaggu
- Paintal as Ramu
- Jankidas as Lala Jankidas
- Shubha Khote as Shobha
- Kamal Kapoor as Thakur Kamal Singh
- Prakash Mehra as himself
- Dev Kumar as Thakur Lukka Singh
- Viju Khote as Kaalia
- Mac Mohan as Fake Income Tax Officer
