= Narendra Bedi =

Indian film director (1937–1982)

- Born: 1 January 1937; Bombay, Bombay Presidency, British India
- Died: 21 October 1982 (aged 45); Bombay, Maharashtra, India
- Years active: 1965–1982
- Known for: Maha Chor; Bandhan; Jawani Diwani; Rafoo Chakkar
- Spouse: Veena Bedi
- Children: Rajat Bedi (son); Manik Bedi (son); Ila Bedi Dutta (daughter)
- Parent: Rajinder Singh Bedi

Narendra Bedi (1 January 1937 – 21 October 1982) was a Bollywood director and son of the writer Rajinder Singh Bedi. He is most known for hits movies like Jawani Diwani (1972) starring Randhir Kapoor and Jaya Bhaduri, Rajesh Khanna starrers Bandhan and Maha Chor , and Amitabh Bachchan starrers Benaam (1974) and Adalat (1977) and the comedy film Rafoo Chakkar.

== Personal life ==
Narendra Bedi was the son of famous Urdu writer and screenwriter Rajinder Singh Bedi. He received a degree in Arts from University of Mumbai, and thereafter started his career by joining the film production team of G. P. Sippy, who later produced Bedi's debut film, Bandhan (1969), starring Rajesh Khanna and Mumtaz.

His films were either in romantic comedy genre like that of Jawani Diwani, Dil Diwana, Rafoo Chakkar, Sanam Teri Kasam or were of action genre like Maha Chor, Khotey Sikkay, and had music by R.D. Burman. His film Sanam Teri Kasam fetched R.D.Burman his very first Filmfare Best Music Director Award. His only flop in his career as a director was Aakhri Sanghursh which released 15 years after his death.

== Filmography ==
- Bandhan (1969)
- Jawani Diwani (1972)
- Dil Diwana (1974)
- Khotey Sikkay (1974)
- Benaam (1974)
- Rafoo Chakkar (1975)
- Maha Chor (1976)
- Adalat (1976)
- Kachche Heere (1982)
- Sanam Teri Kasam (1982)
- Insaan (1982)
- Taaqat (1982)
- Aakhri Sanghursh (1997)
