= Bandhan (1969 film) =

- Directed by: Narendra Bedi
- Produced by: G.P. Sippy
- Starring: Rajesh Khanna; Mumtaz; Jeevan; Kanhaiyalal; Rajendra Nath; Aruna Irani; D.K. Sapru; Anju Mahendru; Ratnamala; Achala Sachdev; Roopesh Kumar; Kamal Kapoor
- Cinematography: K Vaikunth
- Edited by: M. S. Shinde
- Music by: Kalyanji Anandji
- Release date: 1969
- Running time: 190 minutes
- Country: India
- Language: Hindi
- Box office: 2.8 crore

Bandhan (English translation: "tie" or "bond") is a 1969 Hindi film directed by Narendra Bedi, starring Rajesh Khanna and Mumtaz. It was Bedi's directorial debut and the second movie with Khanna and Mumtaz together in the lead roles. The film grossed ₹2.80 crore at the box office in 1969–70. Khanna's songs were performed by the playback singer Mahendra Kapoor. This film is counted among the 17 consecutive hit films of Rajesh Khanna between 1969 and 1971, by adding the two-hero films Marayada and Andaz to the 15 solo hits he starred in over these three years.

== Plot ==
Jeevanlal, who is a thief, lives in a small village in India. He is married to Sita and together they have a daughter Meena and a son, Dharmchand (Dharma), (Rajesh Khanna). One day, Jeevanal burgles the Tehsildar's house, and then hides the stolen property with Dharmchand at the family home. When the police arrive, Dharmchand gives up the stolen property. Jeevanlal is arrested, found guilty and sent to prison. Years later, Jeevanlal remains angry at Dharma. One day, Jeevanlal and Dharma fight over the sale of a cow. Jeevanlal strikes Dharma who takes up a stick in self-defense. Sita intervenes, scolding Dharma for daring to attack his father. She tells Dharma to leave. Dharma moves to Bombay, and finds work with a building contractor. He sends his savings to his mother. Later, Sita receives a letter from Dharma saying that he is about to return. When she goes to the bus-stop to greet him she is told that he has already gone to the family home. When she returns home, she is shocked to find her husband lying dead in a pool of blood and her son standing over the body with a bloodied axe. The police arrest Dharma and he is held on trial for murder. In the climax it is revealed in the court that when Dharma reached home he found his father molesting Gauri (Mumtaz). When he tried to save her his father attacked him and in ensuing struggle Jeevanlal fells on axe and mortally injured. In his last moments he apologized to his son and took promise not to reveal the truth of his sin to his wife. But when prosecution proved that Gauri was present at crime scene and has actually murdered Jeevanlal, Dharma reveals the facts to the court. The judge acquits Dharma finding that the death of Jeevanlal was an accident.

== Reception ==
It received five out of five stars in the Bollywood guide Collections, and grossed ₹ 2.80 crore at the box office in 1969.

== Cast ==
- Rajesh Khanna as Dharamchand "Dharma"
- Mumtaz as Gauri
- Jeevan as Jeevanlal
- Rajendra Nath as Ram Vaidraj
- Kanhaiyalal as Malikram
- D. K. Sapru as Public Prosecutor Kaul
- Sunder as Vaidraj
- Aruna Irani as Chameli
- Achala Sachdev as Seeta
- Anju Mahendru as Dr. Sonia Sharma
- Ratnamala as Jamuna Malikram
- Birbal as Shyam Vaidraj
- Kamal Kapoor as Judge
- Roopesh Kumar as Cook
- Sanjeev Kumar as Advocate Ravi Sharma (special appearance)
- Meena T. as Meena
- Keshav Rana as Zamindar

== Soundtrack ==
While Kalyanji-Anandji provided the music direction, the lyrics were written by Indeevar and Anjaan.

Song	Singer(s)	Lyricist
"Bina Badra Ke Bijuriya Kaise Chamke..."	Mukesh	Anjaan
"Aa Jao, Aa Bhi Jao..."	Mahendra Kapoor	Anjaan
"Aayo Re Saawan, Aayo Re..."	Mahendra Kapoor	Indeevar
"Jana Hai To Jao, Manayenge Nahin..."	Mahendra Kapoor, Asha Bhosle	Indeevar
