= Bepanaah =

1985 film

- Promotional Poster
- Directed by: Jagdish Sidana
- Produced by: V. Sagar Bhagat; Bhagat J. Kumar
- Starring: Shashi Kapoor; Mithun Chakraborty; Poonam Dhillon; Rati Agnihotri; Suresh Oberoi; Madan Puri; Kader Khan
- Cinematography: Baba Azmi
- Music by: Khayyam; Lyrics: Nida Fazli
- Release date: 6 September 1985
- Running time: 130 minutes
- Country: India
- Language: Hindi

Bepanaah is a 1985 Indian Hindi-language film directed by Jagdish Sidana, starring Shashi Kapoor, Mithun Chakraborty, Poonam Dhillon, Rati Agnihotri, Suresh Oberoi, Madan Puri, and Kader Khan in pivotal roles.

== Summary ==
Bajrang, a naive youngster from a small village finds himself exploited when he reaches Bombay, but he is happy as he meets Bhavna Bhardwaj and falls in love with her. But Bhavna loves Ravi Malhotra, a CBI Officer. Bhavna and Ravi get intimate, but circumstances separate them. Bhavna gets pregnant and delivers Ravi's son and names him Rohit. As Bhavna is unable to reveal the name of Ravi, Bajrang rescues her by giving her his family name. But what would happen to Bhavna, when she knows that Bajrang is now a gangster? Moreover, Ravi is now married to kalpana. Does Ravi know the truth? What would happen to Bhavna and would Ravi nab Bajrang forms the climax.

== Cast ==
- Shashi Kapoor as CID Inspector Ravi Malhotra
- Mithun Chakraborty as Bajrang aka Babua
- Poonam Dhillon as Kalpana Malhotra
- Rati Agnihotri as Advocate Bhavna Bharadwaj
- Suresh Oberoi as Akbar Lala (Truck Driver)
- Madan Puri (Voiced by Amrish Puri) as Advocate Devilal
- Kader Khan as Dayashankar "Daddu"
- Dheeraj Kumar as Sheshnag
- Sharat Saxena as Ujagar Singh
- Satyen Kappu as Advocate Pratap Narayan Singh
- Paintal as Dasbihari Brahmachari
- Gajanan Jagirdar as Brahmprakash Bharadwaj
- Brahmachari as Jailor Yusuf Khan
- Mazhar Khan as Jack
- Gurbachan Singh as Babu
- Jankidas as Judge
- Guddi Maruti as Customer in the restaurant
- C.S. Dubey as the man who misleads Bhavna in the court

== Soundtrack ==
Song	Singer
"Taaqat Hai Jiske Paas, Adalat Usiki Hai, Daulat Hai Jiske Paas, Sharafat Usiki Hai"	Kishore Kumar, Mahendra Kapoor, Suresh Wadkar
"Najariya Teer Chalaye, Kamariya Sau Balkhaye"	Kishore Kumar, Asha Bhosle
"Akelapan Mita Do Na"	Asha Bhosle
"Jab Se Tum Ho Meri"	Asha Bhosle
"Jeevan Maran Ke Ghere Mein"	Chorus
