= Bansi Birju =

1972 film by Prakash Verma

- Directed by: Prakash Verma
- Starring: Amitabh Bachchan; Jaya Bhaduri
- Release date: 1 September 1972
- Country: India
- Language: Hindi

Bansi Birju is a 1972 Bollywood romance film directed by Prakash Verma. The film stars Amitabh Bachchan and Jaya Bhaduri.

== Plot ==
The film follows Bansi, a village girl whose father dies during her childhood. After his death, she is taken in by one of his father’s friends. However, she is later taken to Bombay, where she is sold to an ashram. Bansi grows up in this environment under difficult circumstances.

As a young woman, she manages to escape from the ashram and finds herself alone on the streets. During her escape, she meets Birju, who helps her hide from those pursuing her. He offers her protection, and the two gradually form a close bond.

Over time, their relationship develops into love. Despite facing continued threats and social obstacles, Birju remains supportive of Bansi.

== Cast ==
- Amitabh Bachchan as Birju
- Jaya Bhaduri as Bansi
- Anwar Ali as Taxi Driver
- Ramesh Bhatia as Police inspector
- Ramesh Deo as Chndrakant
- Rajan Haksar as Seth Mehtab Chand
- Nigar Sultana as Mithun Bhai
- Yunus Parvez as Khushiram
- Junior Mehmood as Theatre Singer
- K. N. Singh as Jaggu
- Asha Chandra as Tulsi

== Soundtrack ==
Music Director – Vijay Raghava Rao

Lyrics – Yogesh

| No. | Title | Singer(s) | Length |
|---|---|---|---|
| 1. | "Hae Re Saiyan" | Vani Jairam | 3:29 |
| 2. | "Jane Ki Ghadi Jis Din Aaye Hai" | Chitra Singh | 3:14 |
| 3. | "Manwa Re Tu Ga Re Nisdin" | Chitra Singh |
