= Sudhir (Indian actor) =

Indian actor

Sudhir Luthria
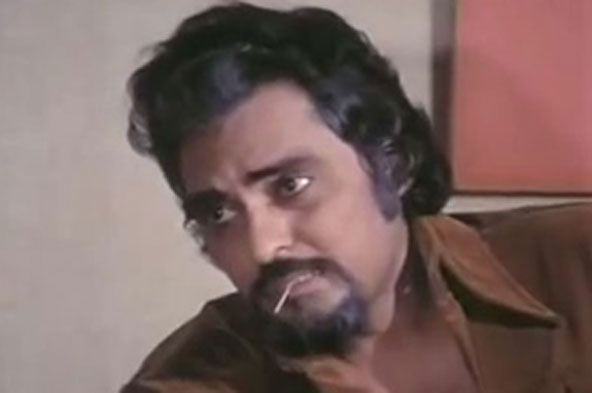
- Born: Bhagwandas Moolchand Luthria; 1944; Lahore, British India
- Died: 12 May 2014 (aged 69–70); Mumbai, Maharashtra, India
- Occupations: Actor, assistant director
- Years active: 1960–2009
- Spouse: Sheila Ray (former)
- Children: Ashok Banker (step-son)
- Relatives: Milan Luthria (nephew)

Bhagwandas Moolchand Luthria (1944 – 12 May 2014), better known as Sudhir, was an Indian actor in Hindi cinema. He was best known for his role in the films a war-drama film Haqeeqat, Khote Sikkay and Dharmatma with Feroz Khan, Satte Pe Satta with Amitabh Bachchan, Hare Rama Hare Krishna, Gambler and Joshila with Dev Anand . He acted in over 200 films in a career spanning from 1962 to 2009. He acted as both Lead and character actor in movies. As an lead and supporting actor in 60s and as a character actor mainly as villain after Mid 70s . He was one of Bollywood's best known villains from the 1970s through the 1990s.

== Career ==
He acted in Prem Patra starring Sadhana and Shashi Kapoor (1962) as Subhash. He appeared in Apna Ghar Apni Kahani (Pyas) opposite Mumtaz in 1968, singing "Jigar me dard kaisa ishko ulfat to nhi kahate" and 'main ye sochkar uske dar se utha tha' from Haqeeqat (1964), 'mujhe raat din ye khayal hai' and 'mere dil pe andheri sa chhan laga' from Ek Phool Ek Bhool (1968).

He often played the second-in-command sidekick to villains Ajit, Prem Nath and Pran, a torturous police inspector, or a sleazy man. He was most known for his shrill voice, long moustache and sideburns. He starred in at least a dozen Amitabh Bachchan movies, such as Deewaar, Kaalia, Majboor, Sharaabi, Satte Pe Satta, Dostana, Shaan and Lal Baadshah. Other notable appearances included Feroz Khan's 1974 hit Khote Sikkay, its sequel Kachche Heere, Dharmatma, as well as Mera Gaon Mera Desh, and roles of a disabled thief in Dev Anand's Hare Rama Hare Krishna (1971), as Police Inspector (Special Appearances) in Subhash Ghai's Meri Jung (1985) and in the Shah Rukh Khan-starring Baadshah (1999). His last film appearances were in Jhoom Barabar Jhoom (2007) and Victoria House (2009).

He also played episodic roles in CID in 2003.

== Filmography ==
=== Films ===
Year	Film	Role	Notes
1961	Umar Qaid	Rakesh	
1962	Prem Patra	Subhash	
1964	Haqeeqat	Ram Singh	
1968	Apna Ghar Apni Kahani		
1969	Ustad 420		
1969	Ek Phool Ek Bhool		
1971	Hare Rama Hare Krishna	Michael	
1971	Mera Gaon Mera Desh	Police Inspector	
1971	Gambler	Ram Mehta	
1973	Joshila	Kundan	
1974	Khote Sikkay	Bhaggu	
1974	Majboor	Ravi's co-worker	
1975	Deewaar	Jaichand	
1975	Dharmatma	Natwar	
1980	Dostana	Inspector Shinde	
1980	Shaan	Ranjeet	
1981	Kaalia	Rawat	
1981	Hotel	Lalwani	
1981	Sannata	Defence Lawyer	
1982	Satte Pe Satta	Som Anand	
1982	Kachche Heere	Bhaggu	
1983	Chor Police	Captain Malhotra	
1984	Sharaabi		
1984	Boxer	Gafoor	
1985	Ram Tere Kitne Nam	Diwan Lalchand	
1985	Meri Jung	Bhosale (Police Inspector)	
1985	Adventures of Tarzan		
1986	Africadalli Sheela		Kannada film
1986	Shatru		
1987	Kizhakku Africavil Sheela		Tamil film
1987	Sheela		
1988	Gunahon Ka Faisla	Shiva	
1989	Awara Zindagi	Tiger	
1989	Sachché Ká Bol-Bálá	One of Bata's goons	
1989	Jung Baaz		
1989	Oonch Neech Beech	Chhote	
1989	Na-Insaafi	John D'Souza	
1989	Elaan-E-Jung	Arjun Singh's man	
1990	Zahreelay	Jaichand Khurana	
1990	C.I.D.	Micheal	
1990	Kali Ganga	Shera	
1990	Gunahon Ka Devta		
1990	Sheshnaag	one of Aghori's Disciples	
1990	Doodh Ka Karz	Jumman	
1990	Zimmedaaar	Raghu	
1991	Farishtay		
1991	Ajooba	Bandit	
1991	Yeh Aag Kab Bujhegi	Investigating Officer Roshanlal	
1991	Jhoothi Shaan	Abdul	
1992	Kisme Kitna Hai Dum	Inspector Khan	
1992	Shola Aur Shabnam	Brij (Jaichand's partner)	
1992	Humlaa	Bhawani's man	
1992	Tahalka	Dong's Right Hand	
1992	Angaar	Health Minister	
1992	Baaz	Gogi	
1993	Aankhen	Tejeshwar's henchman	
1993	Kundan	Sudhir	
1993	Dil Hai Betaab	Sudhir (Vikram's employee)	
1993	Police Wala	Daniel	
1993	Veerta	Mill Manager Mehta	
1994	Raja Babu	Police Inspector	
1994	Zamane Se Kya Darna	Gambler	
1994	Gangster		
1994	Ekka Raja Rani	Police Commissioner Gaekwad	
1994	Ikke Pe Ikka	Police Inspector	
1994	Beta Ho To Aisa	J.K.'s henchman	
1994	Mr. Azaad		
1995	Jawab		
1995	Prem		
1995	Raja	Police Inspector	
1995	Zamaana Deewana	Gullu (Hitman)	
1995	Rock Dancer	Boat Club Manager	
1995	Ram Shastra	Inspector Azhgar Ali	
1997	Aakhri Sanghursh	Baggu	
1997	Share Bazaar	Police Commissioner	
1997	Bhai Bhai	Doctor	
1998	Dulhe Raja	SSP Nissar Khan	
1998	Iski Topi Uske Sarr	Joseph	
1998	Maharaja	Hunter	
1998	Zulm-O-Sitam	Sikandar's Henchman	
1999	Lal Baadshah	Vikram's Henchman	
1999	Safari	Uncle D'Silva	
1999	Chudail No. 1		
1999	Baadshah	Rocky	
2000	Billa No. 786	Balwant Rai	
2002	Humraaz	Tommy	
2004	Deewaar	Mushtaque	
2004	Hatya	Johny	
2007	Jhoom Barabar Jhoom	Contest Co-announcer	
2009	Victoria House	Ramu Chowkidaar	

=== Television ===
Year	Serial	Role	Notes
1993–2001	Zee Horror Show		
1997	Betaal Pachisi	Bash	
2003	CID - The Case of Predictions	Dr. Kailash (episode 249–250)	
2003	CID - The Case of Illusive Bomber	Jinjar (episode 269–270)	

== Death ==
He had long been suffering from a lung infection and he died on 12 May 2014 at the age of 70.
