= Wafadaar =

- Poster
- Directed by: Dasari Narayana Rao
- Story by: M. Balayya; Kader Khan
- Produced by: Shrikant Nahata
- Starring: Rajinikanth; Padmini Kolhapure; Vijayta Pandit
- Cinematography: S. V. Srikanth
- Edited by: Venkataratnam D.
- Music by: Bappi Lahiri
- Release date: 19 July 1985
- Country: India
- Language: Hindi

Wafadaar is a 1985 Indian Hindi film directed by Dasari Narayana Rao. The film stars Rajinikanth, Padmini Kolhapure, Vijayta Pandit for the first time in a love triangle well supported by Kader Khan, Shakti Kapoor, Anupam Kher, Asrani, Paintal and others. It was a box office hit. The film's storyline, centered on a loyal protagonist manipulated into a deceptive romance for a greedy employer's gain, was inspired by the Telugu film Eenaati Bandham Eenaatido (1977), directed by K.S.R. Das. Both films, penned by writer Mannava Balayya.

== Plot ==
Dayasagar plots to obtain the wealth of Naamdev Mahadev Rajgiri. Dayasagar asks his servant Ranga to woo Naamdev's daughter Seeta and marry her. Ranga is unaware that Dayasagar's motive is to kill Seeta to possess her father's fortune. Once Ranga finds out Dayasagar's intent, he revolts and foils Dayasagar's murderous plans. Ranga and Seeta wed and happily live in married bliss.

== Cast ==
- Rajinikanth as Ranga
- Padmini Kolhapure as Seeta
- Vijayta Pandit as Chanda
- Kader Khan as Naamdev Mahadev Rajgiri
- Shakti Kapoor as Prasad
- Anupam Kher as Dayasagar
- Ashalata Wabgaonkar as Mrs. Dayasagar
- Sushma Seth as Mrs. Rajgiri
- Satyen Kappu as Advocate Mahesh Patel

== Songs ==
Bappi Lahiri composed 5 songs penned by Indeevar

Song	Singer
"Dim Dim Dim Tana Dim Dim Dim Dim Tana Dim"	Kishore Kumar, Asha Bhosle
"Ek Chandan Ki Khushboo Ek Madhuban Ki Khushboo"	Kishore Kumar, Asha Bhosle
"Sapnon Ka Tu Raja Jeevan Mein Tu Aaja"	Mohammed Aziz, Asha Bhosle]
"Ghode Pe Chadhna Aata Nahin Chadh Jate Hai"	Bappi Lahiri, S. Janaki
"Mere Sajna"	Vani Jairam
