= Pati Patni =

Indian comedy film

- Directed by: S.A. Akbar
- Written by: B.H. Bukhari
- Produced by: Usman Ali
- Starring: Sanjeev Kumar; Mumtaz; Mehmood; Nanda
- Cinematography: Ratan L. Nagar
- Edited by: G.G. Mayekar
- Music by: R.D. Burman
- Release date: 14 June 1966
- Running time: 159 minutes
- Country: India
- Language: Hindi

Pati Patni is a 1966 Indian Hindi-language comedy film directed by S. A. Akbar. The film stars Sanjeev Kumar, Nanda, Mehmood and Mumtaz in lead roles, and it explores the comedic misadventures that ensue in the lives of a married couple. With a blend of humor and social commentary, Pati Patni gained popularity upon its release and became a notable entry in the romantic-comedy genre of Indian cinema during the 1960s.

== Plot ==
Gauri (Nanda) is part of a women's group but resists the changes being introduced by Lali (Shashikala), who has already swayed Sundari (Leela Mishra) and Kala (Mumtaz). This influence troubles Dhanprasad (Om Prakash), the concerned husband and father. Gauri soon meets Amar (Sanjeev Kumar), Dhanprasad's nephew, and they fall in love and marry. However, after Amar is injured in an accident and becomes disabled, Gauri takes on the role of breadwinner. She starts working closely with Gupta (Sujit Kumar), and they grow quite friendly. Meanwhile, Lali continues to encourage Sundari and Kala towards a bolder independence. Amar, sensing a closeness between Gauri and Gupta, becomes suspicious of their relationship, putting strain on his marriage with Gauri.

== Cast ==
- Sanjeev Kumar as Amar
- Mumtaz as Kala
- Nanda as Gauri
- Mehmood as Pashupati Pachi
- Shashikala as Lali
- Om Prakash as Dhanprasad
- Leela Mishra as Sundari
- Sujit Kumar as Gupta

== Production ==
The film was produced by Usman Ali. "Pati Patni" was notable for its strong casting, especially with the pairing of Sanjeev Kumar and Nanda, both of whom were well-regarded for their acting versatility. Mumtaz's role in the film brought her widespread attention, and she continued to build on this momentum in her later career. The film was shot predominantly in Mumbai, with sets designed to capture the feel of urban, middle-class India.

== Music ==
The film's music was composed by R.D. Burman, one of the most prominent composers of the era.

== Tracklist ==
Pati Patni Film Songs
No.	Title	Lead vocals	Length
01	Maar Dalega Dard E Jigar	Asha Bhosle	3:27
02	Binti Karoon Ghanshyam	Lata Mangeshkar	3:43
03	Kajre Badarwa Re	Lata Mangeshkar	3:29
04	Meri Patni Mujhe Satati Hai	Manna Dey, Mehmood and Surendra	3:34
05	Koi Iska Dava Kijiye	Asha Bhosle	3:33
06	Taa Taa Tiyo	Manna Dey and Usha Mangeshkar	3:30
07	Allah Jane Main Hoon Kaun	Manna Dey	5:12
08	Yo Kaise Dekha Hai Mujhe	Asha Bhosle, Manna Dey	3:52

== See also ==
- R. D. Burman filmography
- Lata Mangeshkar
- Om Prakash
