= Jaya Bachchan =

Indian actress and politician (born 1948)

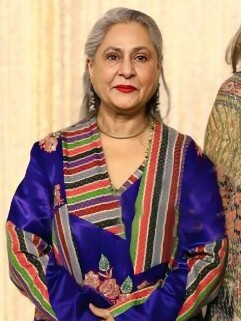
- Bachchan in 2024

Member of Parliament, Rajya Sabha
- Incumbent
- Assumed office 5 July 2004
- Preceded by: Lalit Suri
- Constituency: Uttar Pradesh

Personal details
- Born: Jaya Bhaduri; 9 April 1948 (age 78) Jabalpur, Berar, India (present-day Madhya Pradesh)
- Party: Samajwadi Party
- Spouse: Amitabh Bachchan (m. 1973)
- Children: Shweta; Abhishek
- Education: Loreto College
- Alma mater: Film and Television Institute
- Occupation: Actress; politician
- Awards: Padma Shri (1992)
- Family: Bachchan family

Jaya Bachchan (née Bhaduri; born 9 April 1948) is an Indian actress and politician. She has served as a Member of Parliament in the Rajya Sabha from the Samajwadi Party since 2004. Known for her work in many Hindi films, she is noted for reinforcing a natural style of acting in both mainstream and "middle-of-the-road" cinema. Bachchan has received several accolades, including ten Filmfare Awards and the Padma Shri, the fourth-highest civilian honour awarded by the Government of India.

Bachchan made her film debut as a teenager in Satyajit Ray's Mahanagar (1963), and her first screen role as an adult was in Guddi (1971), directed by Hrishikesh Mukherjee, with whom she collaborated in several films thereafter. She was noted for her performances in films like Uphaar (1971), Koshish (1972) and Kora Kagaz (1974). Throughout the decade, she formed a successful screen partnership with her husband Amitabh Bachchan, opposite whom she starred in films such as Zanjeer (1973), Abhimaan (1973), Chupke Chupke (1975) and Mili (1975), as well as the cult film Sholay (1975). She won the Filmfare Award for Best Actress for Abhimaan, Kora Kagaz and Nauker (1979).

Following her marriage and the birth of their children, she restricted her work in films, notably starring in Silsila (1981) before quitting acting for an extended 17-year sabbatical. She returned to acting with Govind Nihalani's independent drama Hazaar Chaurasi Ki Maa (1998). Bachchan revived her career with a number of character parts following her comeback. She won three Filmfare Award for Best Supporting Actress for playing emotionally troubled mothers in the commercially successful dramas Fiza (2000), Kabhi Khushi Kabhie Gham... (2001) and Kal Ho Naa Ho (2003). After another hiatus, she appeared in Karan Johar's Rocky Aur Rani Kii Prem Kahaani (2023).

== Early life and family ==
Jaya Bachchan was born as Jaya Bhaduri into a Bengali family on 9 April 1948 in Jabalpur, in the Central Provinces and Berar of the Dominion of India (now in Madhya Pradesh, India). She is the daughter of Tarun Kumar Bhaduri, a journalist, author, and poet, and his wife, Indira. She has two sisters, Rita and Nita. Nita's son Kunal Ross is married to actress Tillotama Shome.

Bachchan was educated at St. Joseph's Convent School, Bhopal, and at Loreto College, Kolkata. She was awarded the Best All-India N.C.C. Cadet Award during the Republic Day celebrations of 1966. She then graduated with a gold medal from Film and Television Institute of India, Pune.

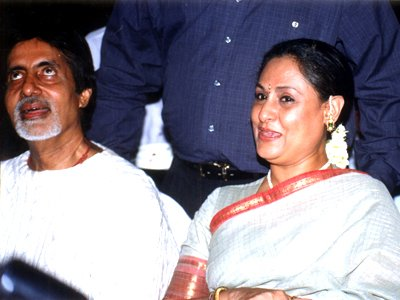
Jaya Bachchan with her husband Amitabh Bachchan in 2002

Jaya married actor Amitabh Bachchan, on 3 June 1973. The couple has two children: Shweta Bachchan and Abhishek Bachchan, who is also an actor. Shweta is married to industrialist Nikhil Nanda, grandson of Raj Kapoor, and has two children, Navya Naveli Nanda and Agastya Nanda, while Abhishek is married to Miss World 1994 and actress Aishwarya Rai with whom he has a daughter, Aaradhya Bachchan.

== Acting career ==
=== Debut and early career ===
Bachchan first starred in Satyajit Ray's Bengali film, Mahanagar (1963) at the age of 14, with Anil Chatterjee and Madhabi Mukherjee. She then appeared in two more Bengali films: a 13-minute short Suman, and the comedy Dhanyee Meye (1971), where she played the role of Uttam Kumar's sister-in-law.

Inspired by her experience with Ray, she joined the Film and Television Institute of India (FTII), Pune and graduated with a gold medal. Hrishikesh Mukherjee cast her in Guddi (1971), to play the eponymous role of a petite school-girl obsessed with film star Dharmendra. Guddi was a commercial success, and created the girl-next-door image for her, which she was often associated with through the rest of her career. While she did venture out to play glamorous roles as in Jawani Diwani, (1972) and a semi-negative character of an amnesia-faking heroine in Anamika (1973), she was most recognised for her roles epitomising middle-class sensibility, which she played amiably in films of "middle-cinema" directors such as Gulzar, Basu Chatterjee and Mukherjee. These films include Uphaar (1971), Piya Ka Ghar (1972), Parichay (1972), Koshish (1972) and Bawarchi (1972). They also made her a superstar.

In Gulzar's Koshish, Bhaduri and Sanjeev Kumar played a deaf couple who struggle through their difficulties as disabled people. She described the film as "a learning experience" which motivated her to do social work in future.

She first acted with Amitabh Bachchan in Bansi Birju (1972), followed by B. R. Ishara's Ek Nazar also in the same year. When Amitabh had faced a string of flops and most lead heroines refused to work with him in the Salim–Javed scripted Zanjeer (1973), she agreed to step in. The film turned out to be a big hit creating Bachchan's angry-young-man image. All their successive films as a pair were huge hits – Abhimaan (1973), Chupke Chupke (1975), Mili (1975) and Sholay (1975).

Her daughter Shweta was born around the time Jaya and Amitabh were working on Sholay. Following this, she retired from films and focused on raising her children, making an exception for Yash Chopra's Silsila (1981), once again opposite her husband. During the late 1980s, she wrote the story for Shahenshah (1988), which starred her husband in the lead.

=== Comeback and intermittent work (1998–present) ===
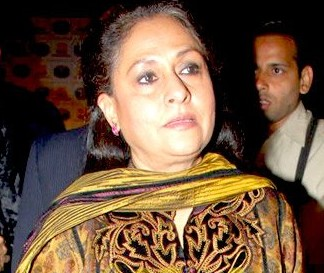
Bachchan at an event

After a gap of 17 years, she returned to acting with Govind Nihalani's Hazaar Chaurasi Ki Maa (1998), a film about the Naxalite movement. Her performance in the film earned critical acclaim, and earned her a second Filmfare Special Award.

In 2000, she starred alongside Karisma Kapoor and Hrithik Roshan in the crime drama Fiza as a mother longing for her son's return who goes missing during the 1993 Bombay riots. The film received critical acclaim upon release, with particular praise directed towards Bachchan's performance. Sanjeev Bariana of The Tribune opined that "Bachchan delivers a commendable performance, displaying mixed emotions through trying times delicately.", while Screen film critic Chaya Unnikrishnan noted that "Bachchan looks every bit a Muslim woman and etches out her character superbly." Moreover, it emerged as a commercial success at the box-office, grossing ₹322 million (US$7.17 million) worldwide. Fiza earned Bachchan her first Filmfare Award for Best Supporting Actress.

She then starred in Karan Johar's ensemble family drama Kabhi Khushi Kabhie Gham (2001) with her husband and in Nikhil Advani's romantic comedy drama Kal Ho Naa Ho (2003), playing Preity Zinta's mother, Jennifer Kapur, both of which also earned her the Filmfare Award for Best Supporting Actress. She starred with her son Abhishek in Laaga Chunari Mein Daag (2007) and Drona (2008).

Bachchan's speech during the musical launch of Drona in 2008 was criticised by some sections of politicians in Maharashtra. In response to the film's director, Goldie Behl, making his introductory speech in English, she said in Hindi, "Hum UP ke log hain, isliye Hindi mein baat karenge, Maharashtra ke log maaf kijiye". (Translation: "We are people from UP, so we will speak in Hindi. People of Maharashtra, please forgive us.") Subsequently, she encouraged actress Priyanka Chopra to speak in Hindi. Maharashtra Navnirman Sena (MNS) president Raj Thackeray commented that she had no business referring to all the people of Maharashtra in her statement. He threatened to ban all of her films unless she apologised in a public forum for hurting the sentiments of Maharashtrians. MNS workers began to attack theatres screening The Last Lear, which starred her husband. Shiv Sena MP Sanjay Raut also criticised her statement, "After making all your success and fortune in Mumbai, if you feel like saying that we are from UP, it's miserable". Amitabh tendered an apology for her statement on her behalf.

In 2011, she appeared in the Bangladeshi film Meherjaan starring Victor Banerjee and Humayun Faridi. The film is based on a Bangladesh-Pakistan love story in the backdrop of the 1971 Bangladesh atrocities. In 2023, she starred alongside Dharmendra and Shabana Azmi in Karan Johar's romantic comedy family drama Rocky Aur Rani Kii Prem Kahaani, which emerged as the third highest-grossing Hindi film of the year. Taran Adarsh of Bollywood Hungama noted, "Bachchan is electrifying. Her commanding presence, authoritative attitude and cold stares – this is a stand-out act that's sure to be talked about by moviegoers." Her performance in the film earned her a fourth nomination for the Filmfare Award for Best Supporting Actress.

== Artistry and legacy ==
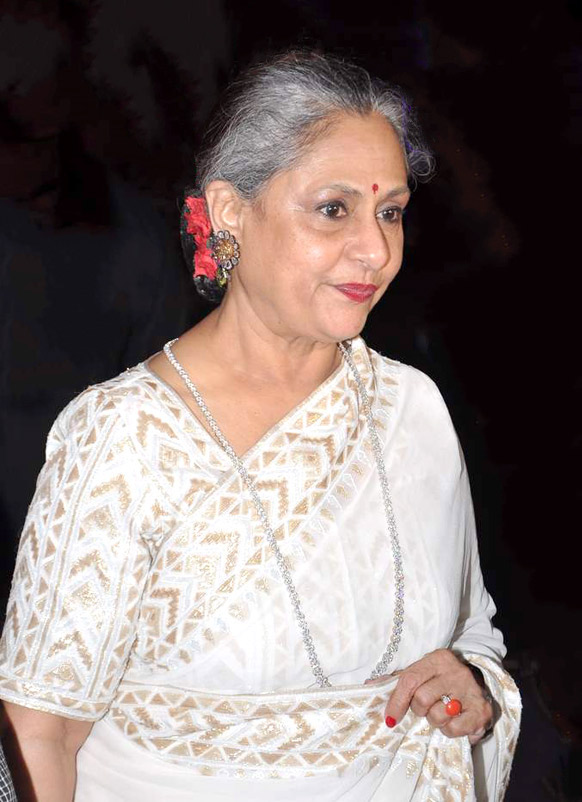
Bachchan at an event in 2016

One of the highest paid actress of the 1970s, in 2022, she was placed in Outlook India's "75 Best Bollywood Actresses" list. Filmfare included Bachchan's performance in Abhimaan in its Bollywood's "80 Iconic Performances" list.

Writing for Times of India, Subhash K. Jha termed her an "exceptional talent" and noted, "During her brief innings of superstardom she was a far bigger star than her husband." Samriddhi Patwa of Filmfare noted, "The Bengali actress who had long hair, a sweet smile, and significant roles conquered the silver screen." Dinesh Raheja of Rediff.com termed her an "outspoken actress" and noted, "Diminutive she may be, but Jaya Bhaduri has managed to cast a long shadow over the world of Hindi films." Indian Express said that her filmography is "full of gems" and added, "The Bengali beauty ruled the silver screen with meaningful roles." Kanika Katyal of Firstpost noted, "Full of vigour and idealism, Jaya found herself at home in the "middle cinema" of the 1970s", and added, "Each time she emoted, the camera was firmly in her grip."

== Political career ==
Bachchan was first elected in 2004 as the Member of Parliament from the Samajwadi Party, representing Uttar Pradesh in the Rajya Sabha till March 2006. She was disqualified in 2006 for holding an office of profit. Subsequently, she got a second term from June 2006 till July 2010 and in February 2010 she stated her intent to complete her term. She was re-elected in 2012 for the third term and again in 2018 for her fourth term in the Rajya Sabha from Samajwadi Party. Also, she campaigned for All India Trinamool Congress during 2021 West Bengal Legislative Assembly election.

=== Parliamentary Committee assignments ===
- 13 September 2021 onwards: Member, Committee on External Affairs

=== Positions held ===
Jaya Bachchan has been elected 5 times as Rajya Sabha MP.

As per the Election affidavit of 2018 (Rajya Sabha), Jaya Bachchan has assets worth ₹1,001.63 crores and liabilities worth ₹105.64 crores.

=== Rajya Sabha ===
Position	Party	Constituency	From	To	Tenure
Member of Parliament, Rajya Sabha (1st Term)	SP	Uttar Pradesh	5 July 2004	14 July 2004	9 days
Member of Parliament, Rajya Sabha (2nd Term)	SP	Uttar Pradesh	12 June 2006	4 July 2010	4 years, 22 days
Member of Parliament, Rajya Sabha (3rd Term)	SP	Uttar Pradesh	3 April 2012	2 April 2018	5 years, 364 days
Member of Parliament, Rajya Sabha (4th Term)	SP	Uttar Pradesh	3 April 2018	2 April 2024	5 years, 365 days
Member of Parliament, Rajya Sabha (5th Term)	SP	Uttar Pradesh	3 April 2024	2 April 2030	5 years, 364 days

== Filmography ==
=== Films ===
List of film credits
Year	Title	Role	Language	Notes	Ref.
1963	Mahanagar	Bani Mazumdar	Bengali		
1971	Guddi	Kusum (Guddi)	Hindi		
1971	Uphaar	Mrinmayee (Minoo)	Hindi		
1971	Jai Jawan Jai Makan		Hindi		
1971	Dhanyee Meye	Mansa	Bengali		
1971	Atattor Din Porey		Bengali		
1971	Janani		Bengali		
1972	Jawani Diwani	Neeta Thakur	Hindi		
1972	Bawarchi	Krishna Harinath Sharma	Hindi		
1972	Parichay	Rama Roy	Hindi		
1972	Bansi Birju	Bansi	Hindi		
1972	Piya Ka Ghar	Malti Shankar	Hindi		
1972	Annadata	Aarti	Hindi		
1972	Ek Nazar	Shabnam	Hindi		
1972	Samadhi	Rekha	Hindi		
1972	Koshish	Aarti Mathur	Hindi		
1972	Shor	Rani (Raat Ki Rani)	Hindi		
1973	Gaai Aur Gori	Vijaya	Hindi		
1973	Anamika	Anamika/Kanchan/Archana	Hindi		
1973	Phagun	Santosh (Toshi)	Hindi		
1973	Zanjeer	Mala	Hindi		
1973	Abhimaan	Uma Kumar	Hindi		
1974	Dil Diwana	Neeta	Hindi		
1974	Kora Kagaz	Archana Gupta	Hindi		
1974	Naya Din Nai Raat	Sushma	Hindi		
1974	Doosri Sita	Seeta Wagle	Hindi		
1974	Sadhu Judhisthirer Korcha		Bengali		
1975	Mili	Mili Khanna	Hindi		
1975	Chupke Chupke	Vasudha Kumar	Hindi		
1975	Sholay	Radha Singh	Hindi		
1977	Abhi To Jee Lein	Jaya	Hindi	Delayed release	
1978	Ek Baap Chhe Bete	Asha	Hindi	Cameo	
1979	Nauker	Geeta	Hindi		
1981	Silsila	Shobha Malhotra	Hindi		
1995	Akka		Marathi		
1995	Daughters of This Century	Abhagi	Hindi		
1998	Hazaar Chaurasi Ki Maa	Sujata Chatterjee	Hindi		
2000	Fiza	Nishatbi Ikramullah	Hindi		
2001	Kabhi Khushi Kabhie Gham	Nandini Raichand	Hindi		
2002	Koi Mere Dil Se Poochhe	Mansi Devi	Hindi		
2002	Desh	Suprabha Chowdhury	Bengali		
2003	Kal Ho Naa Ho	Jennifer Kapur	Hindi		
2007	Laaga Chunari Mein Daag	Savitri Sahay	Hindi		
2008	Love Songs : Yesterday, Today & Tomorrow	Mridula Chatterjee	Hindi		
2008	Drona	Queen Jayanti	Hindi		
2009	Paa	Narrator	Hindi	special appearance	
2010	Aap Ke Liye Hum	Adoptive mother	Hindi		
2010	Aahat – Ek Ajib Kahani	Jaya	Hindi	Delayed release	
2011	Meherjaan	Meher	Bangladeshi		
2012	Ganga Devi		Bhojpuri		
2013	Sunglass	Chitra's mother	Bengali/Hindi		
2016	Ki & Ka	Herself	Hindi	Cameo	
2023	Rocky Aur Rani Kii Prem Kahaani	Dhanalakshmi Randhawa	Hindi		
2024	Sadabahar	Nini	Hindi		

=== Other roles ===
List of other roles
Year	Title	Role	Notes	Ref.
1988	Shahenshah	Writer (Story)		
1993–1994	Dekh Bhai Dekh	Producer	Under Amitabh Bachchan Corporation	
2005	Antarmahal	Producer	Bengali film	
2024	Angry Young Men	Herself	Documentary	

== Accolades ==
=== Civilian Award ===
- 1992 – Padma Shri – India's fourth highest civilian honour by the Government of India.

=== Major film awards ===
List of major film awards and nominations received by Jaya Bachchan
Year	Award	Category	Work	Result	Ref.
1972	Filmfare Awards	Special Award	Uphaar	Won	
1972	Filmfare Awards	Best Actress	Uphaar	Nominated	
1972	Filmfare Awards	Best Actress	Guddi	Nominated	
1974	Filmfare Awards	Best Actress	Koshish	Nominated	
1974	Filmfare Awards	Best Actress	Abhimaan	Won	
1975	Filmfare Awards	Best Actress	Kora Kagaz	Won	
1976	Filmfare Awards	Best Actress	Mili	Nominated	
1980	Filmfare Awards	Best Actress	Nauker	Won	
1982	Filmfare Awards	Best Actress	Silsila	Nominated	
1998	Filmfare Awards	Special Award	Hazaar Chaurasi Ki Maa	Won	
2001	Filmfare Awards	Best Supporting Actress	Fiza	Won	
2002	Filmfare Awards	Best Supporting Actress	Kabhi Khushi Kabhie Gham	Won	
2004	Filmfare Awards	Best Supporting Actress	Kal Ho Naa Ho	Won	
2007	Filmfare Awards	Lifetime Achievement Award	—N/a	Won	
2024	Filmfare Awards	Best Supporting Actress	Rocky Aur Rani Kii Prem Kahaani	Nominated	
2025	Filmfare Awards	Special Award	—N/a	Won	
2001	International Indian Film Academy Awards	Best Supporting Actress	Fiza	Won	
2002	International Indian Film Academy Awards	Best Supporting Actress	Kabhi Khushi Kabhie Gham	Won	
2004	International Indian Film Academy Awards	Best Supporting Actress	Kal Ho Naa Ho	Won	
2024	International Indian Film Academy Awards	Best Supporting Actress	Rocky Aur Rani Kii Prem Kahaani	Nominated	
2001	Zee Cine Awards	Best Actor in a Supporting Role – Female	Fiza	Won	
2004	Zee Cine Awards	Best Actor in a Supporting Role – Female	Kal Ho Naa Ho	Nominated	
2024	Zee Cine Awards	Best Actor in a Supporting Role – Female	Rocky Aur Rani Kii Prem Kahaani	Nominated	
2004	Screen Awards	Best Supporting Actress	Kal Ho Naa Ho	Nominated	
2004	Producers Guild Film Awards	Best Actress in a Supporting Role	Kal Ho Naa Ho	Won	
2001	Bollywood Movie Awards	Best Actress (Critics)	Fiza	Nominated	
2001	Bollywood Movie Awards	Best Supporting Actress	Fiza	Nominated	
2001	Sansui Viewers' Choice Movie Awards	Best Supporting Actress	Fiza	Nominated	
2002	Sansui Viewers' Choice Movie Awards	Best Supporting Actress	Kabhi Khushi Kabhie Gham	Won	
2003	Sansui Viewers' Choice Movie Awards	Best Supporting Actress	Koi Mere Dil Se Poochhe	Nominated	
2004	Sansui Viewers' Choice Movie Awards	Best Supporting Actress	Kal Ho Naa Ho	Nominated	

=== Other film awards ===
Won

- 1972 – Bengal Film Journalists' Association Award for Special Award (Hindi Film) – Guddi
- 1999 – Anandalok Award for Special Editors' Award
- 2001 – Bengal Film Journalists' Association Award for Best Supporting Actress – Fiza

=== Honours and recognitions ===
- 1994 – Yash Bharti Award, Uttar Pradesh's highest award from the Government of Uttar Pradesh
- 2000 – Mumbai Academy of the Moving Image Award for her "abiding contribution to Cinema"
- 2004 – Lifetime Achievement Award at the Sansui Viewers' Choice Movie Awards
- 2010 – Lifetime Achievement Award at the "Tongues On Fire" Film Festival in London London Asian Film Festival (UK Asian film festival)
- 2012 – Lifetime Achievement Award at Jaipur International Film Festival (JIFF)
- 2013 – Master Deenanath Mangeshkar (Vishesh Puraskar) Award for her dedicated services to Indian theatre and cinema

== Sources ==
- Banerjee, Shampa; Anil Srivastava (1988). One Hundred Indian Feature Films: An Annotated Filmography. Taylor & Francis. ISBN 0-8240-9483-2.
- Gulzar, S.G.; Govind Nihalani, Saibal Chatterjee (2003). Encyclopaedia of Hindi cinema. Popular Prakashan, Encyclopædia Britannica (India). ISBN 81-7991-066-0.
- Dawar, Ramesh (2006). Bollywood Yesterday-Today-Tomorrow. Star Publications. ISBN 1-905863-01-2.
- Peter John, Ali. "Jaya is aback, Jaya Hey!". Screen India. Express India. Archived from the original on 28 May 2010.
