= Jawani Diwani =

1972 film by Narendra Bedi

- Directed by: Narender Bedi
- Written by: Inder Raj Anand (Story & Screenplay); Kader Khan (Dialogue)
- Produced by: Ramesh Behl
- Starring: Randhir Kapoor; Jaya Bhaduri
- Music by: R. D. Burman
- Distributed by: Rose Films Pvt. Ltd
- Release date: 14 July 1972
- Country: India
- Language: Hindi

Jawani Diwani (transl. Crazy youth) is a 1972 Hindi-language musical romance film directed by Narender Bedi, and starring Randhir Kapoor, Jaya Bhaduri, Balraj Sahni, and Nirupa Roy as leads. This film was Kader Khan's debut as a dialogue writer.

The film is most remembered for its songs by R.D. Burman, including, "Jaane Jaan Doodta Phir Ruha", "Saamne Yeh Koun Aaya", "Nahi Nahi Abhi Nahi" and "Yeh Jawani Hai Diwani". The film was a musical hit and the ninth highest grossing film at the Indian Box Office.

After being stereotyped in the girl-next-door image after her Bollywood debut film, Guddi (1971), Jaya Bhaduri tried to break out of the mould with a glamorous role in the film.

== Plot ==
Madhu falls in love with Ravi Anand, son of an employee in her Thakur brother's household. When they get married, the Thakur breaks all ties with them. They move into Ravi's home with his younger brother, Vijay, who meets a girl, Neeta, at school, with the usual problems with parents. She turns out to be the Thakur's daughter, who has been promised in marriage to Benny Sinha.

== Cast ==
- Randhir Kapoor as Vijay Anand
- Jaya Bhaduri as Neeta Thakur
- Balraj Sahni as Ravi Anand
- Nirupa Roy as Madhu Anand
- Iftekhar as Thakur
- A. K. Hangal as College Principal
- Narendra Nath as Benny Sinha
- Paintal as Ratan
- Satyendra Kapoor as Mamaji
- Jagdish Raj as Mr. Sharma
- Viju Khote as Mr. Gupta

== Crew ==
- Director – Narendra Bedi
- Writer – Inder Raj Anand, Kader Khan
- Producer – Ramesh Behl
- Music Director – Rahul Dev Burman
- Lyricist – Anand Bakshi
- Playback Singers – Asha Bhosle, Kishore Kumar
- Soundtrack Label – Polydor (now Universal Music India Limited)

== Music ==
R. D. Burman composed and produced the music for this movie. The lyrics were written by Anand Bakshi. The song, "Jaane Jaan Dhoondta Phir Raha" made it to #26 on the Binaca Geetmala annual list 1972. The title of the hit film, Yeh Jawaani Hai Deewani (2013) was taken from a hit song from the film, which in turn was recreated from his own version in the Bengali movie Rajkumari starring Tanuja, while it was subsequently recreated in the 2019 movie Student of the Year 2, a sequel to Student of the Year, with music composed by Vishal–Shekhar, and sung by Vishal Dadlani and Payal Dev, and Kishore Kumar (only singing the lyric tune of Yeh Jawani Hai Deewani).

Song	Singer
"Samne Yeh Kaun Aaya"	Kishore Kumar
"Yeh Jawani Hai Deewani"	Kishore Kumar
"Jaan-E-Jaan Dhoondta Phir Raha Hoon Tumhe Raat Din"	Kishore Kumar, Asha Bhosle
"Agar Saaz Chheda, Tarane Banenge"	Kishore Kumar, Asha Bhosle
"Nahin Nahin, Abhi Nahin, Abhi Karo Intezar"	Kishore Kumar, Asha Bhosle
"Hay Tauba"	Asha Bhosle
