= Dil Diwana =

- Poster
- Directed by: Narendra Bedi
- Written by: K. K. Shukla; Jayant Dharmadhikari (Story & Screenplay); Kader Khan (Dialogue)
- Produced by: Ramesh Behl
- Starring: Randhir Kapoor; Jaya Bhaduri
- Cinematography: Peter Periara
- Edited by: B. S. Glaad
- Music by: R. D. Burman
- Release date: 26 October 1974
- Country: India
- Language: Hindi

Dil Diwana is a 1974 Bollywood drama film directed by Narendra Bedi. It starred Randhir Kapoor and Jaya Bhaduri in lead roles. R. D. Burman composed the music for the film.

== Cast ==
- Randhir Kapoor as Vijay
- Jaya Bhaduri as Neeta
- Aruna Irani as Geeta
- Kader Khan as Advocate
- Komal as Sunita
- Kamal Kapoor as Kapoor
- Pinchoo Kapoor as Manager
- Mumtaz Begum as Neeta's Mother
- Satyen Kappu as Jamal Khan
- Durga Khote as Vijay's Grandmother
- Manmohan as Pyarelal
- Paintal as Ratan

== Plot ==
Vijay lives a wealthy lifestyle with his widowed grandmother in a palatial house. He spends all day in bed, and all night in the company of at least one girlfriend. He travels to Kashmir, has an affair with beautiful Gita, spends the night with her, and even poses as her husband. Upon his return to Bombay, he loses his heart to gorgeous Sunita, who also falls in love with him. All this comes to naught, when Sunita finds out that he has a girlfriend in Nita, not knowing that Nita is only employed with Vijay's firm. Nita's positive influence does get Vijay to mend his ways, and he decides to introduce Nita to his grandma so that they can get married. But a surprise awaits Vijay there when Gita arrives from Kashmir along with her brother, Pyarelal and a small child, she claims is Vijay's. Watch what impact this has on Nita and Vijay's grandmother, and on Vijay, who must now get used to being a husband and father.

== Soundtrack ==
Song	Singer
"Sun Neeta"	Kishore Kumar
"Ja Re Ja Bewafa"	Kishore Kumar, Asha Bhosle
"Kisi Se Dosti Kar Lo"	Kishore Kumar, Asha Bhosle
"Mujhko Mohabbat"	Kishore Kumar, Asha Bhosle
"Main Ladki"	Kishore Kumar, Asha Bhosle
"Khan Chacha, Khan Chacha"	Kishore Kumar, Asha Bhosle, Manna Dey
