= Paisa Yeh Paisa =

- Directed by: Sohanlal Kanwar
- Written by: Ram Kelkar
- Produced by: Ashok Khanna
- Starring: Jackie Shroff; Meenakshi Sheshadri
- Cinematography: Siba Mishra
- Edited by: Satyaprakash Suri; Narendra Arora
- Music by: Usha Khanna
- Production company: Deepali Arts
- Release date: 18 October 1985
- Country: India
- Language: Hindi

Paisa Yeh Paisa is a 1985 Indian Hindi-language film directed by Sohanlal Kanwar and produced by Ashok Khanna. It stars Jackie Shroff and Meenakshi Sheshadri, with Nutan, Deven Verma, Bindu, Gulshan Grover, Amrish Puri, Om Shivpuri in supporting roles.

== Cast ==
- Nutan as Laxmi
- Jackie Shroff as Shyam
- Meenakshi Sheshadri as Sapna
- Deven Verma as Sukhiram
- Bindu as Shanti
- Gulshan Grover as Guddu
- Amrish Puri as Jugal
- Om Shivpuri as Chunilal
- Satyendra Kapoor as Professor

== Soundtrack ==
M. G. Hashmat wrote all songs.

Song	Singer
"Mera Malik Mera Dil"	Lata Mangeshkar
"Jis Dil Mein Pyar" (Solo)	Kishore Kumar
"Zor Se Bajao Zara Band Baaja, Nachke Dikhao Bua Ji Ko Tamasha"	Kishore Kumar, Mohammed Aziz, Anuradha Paudwal
"Sajna O Sajna Dil Nahiyo Lagna"	Mohammed Aziz, Anuradha Paudwal
"Jis Dil Mein Pyar Na Ho" (Duet)	Manhar Udhas, Alka Yagnik
