= Anjane Mein =

1978 film

- Directed by: Samir Ganguly
- Starring: Rishi Kapoor; Neetu Singh
- Music by: Kalyanji-Anandji
- Release date: 20 May 1978
- Country: India
- Language: Hindi

Anjane Mein is a 1978 Bollywood romantic drama film directed by Samir Ganguly. The film stars Rishi Kapoor and Neetu Singh in lead roles.

== Cast ==
- Rishi Kapoor as Raja
- Neetu Singh as Rani
- Nirupa Roy as Mrs. Shanti Lal
- Ranjeet as Ranjeet
- Asha Sachdev as Rita
- Jagdeep as Abdullah
- Satyendra Kapoor as Manohar Lal
- Ramesh Deo as Inspector Gavaskar
- Anwar Hussain as Sher Singh

== Soundtrack ==
Lyrics: Gulshan Bawra

Song	Singer
"Dil Ka Rishta Jod Diya Hai"	Kishore Kumar, Asha Bhosle
"Gayi Kaam Se Gayi Ye Ladki"	Kishore Kumar
"Jeevan Ke Sab Sukh Paye Tu (Male)"	Amit Kumar
"Jeevan Ke Sab Sukh Paye Tu (Female)"	Lata Mangeshkar
"Main Jan Gaya Hoon"	Kishore Kumar
"Meri Jaan Zara Thik Se Dekho"	Kishore Kumar, Asha Bhosle
"Sachai Ki Raah Mein"	Lata Mangeshkar
