= Jhoothi Shaan =

- Film poster
- Directed by: Ranjan Bose
- Written by: Ranjan Bose
- Produced by: Askari Jafri; Sanjay Gulati
- Starring: Shabana Azmi; Mithun Chakraborty; Poonam Dhillon; Shakti Kapoor
- Cinematography: Nando Bhattacharya
- Edited by: Mukhtar Ahmed, Dilip Darak Suraj Kumar
- Music by: R. D. Burman
- Release date: 28 February 1992
- Country: India
- Language: Hindi

Jhoothi Shaan is a 1992 Indian Hindi drama film directed by Ranjan Bose. The film stars Shabana Azmi, Mithun Chakraborty, Poonam Dhillon and Kanwaljit Singh in lead roles.

== Plot ==
Rani Maa still believes that she is a queen even though her palace has been turned into a hotel. She has three daughters, Krishna, Ganga, and Kaveri, and a son, Kuldeep. The film's twist comes when Rani Maa is informed by the police about four bank-robbers who are staying in her hotel.

== Cast ==
- Shabana Azmi as Krishna
- Mithun Chakraborty as Prakash
- Poonam Dhillon as Ganga
- Kanwaljit Singh as Dinesh
- Pallavi Joshi as Kaveri
- Nadira as Rani maa
- Deven Verma
- Jagdeep
- Shakti Kapoor as Kuldeep
- Satyen Kappu as Mahendranath
- Sudhir as Abdul

== Soundtrack ==
"Rani Ki Nikli Sawari" was written by Javed Akhtar and the rest by Yogesh Gaud.

Song	Singer
"Rani Ki Nikli"	Kumar Sanu
"Janun Janun"	Asha Bhosle, Shailendra Singh
"Dil Mere Lehra"	Asha Bhosle, Suresh Wadkar
"Rimjhim Barse"	Asha Bhosle, Amit Kumar
"Jo Aap Aaye Bahar Laye"	Asha Bhosle, Amit Kumar, Chandrani Mukherjee
