= Sanam Teri Kasam (1982 film) =

1982 film by Narendra Bedi

- Poster
- Directed by: Narendra Bedi
- Screenplay by: Suroor–Subhash; Kader Khan (dialogue)
- Story by: Suroor–Subhash
- Produced by: Barkha Roy
- Starring: Kamal Haasan; Reena Roy; Kader Khan; Ranjeet; Jeevan
- Cinematography: Kaka Thakur
- Edited by: Waman Bhonsle; Gurudutt Shirali
- Music by: R. D. Burman
- Production company: Barkhaa Movies
- Release date: 14 May 1982
- Country: India
- Language: Hindi

Sanam Teri Kasam (transl. Swear on you, my beloved) is a 1982 Indian Hindi-language romantic comedy film directed by Narendra Bedi and produced by Barkha Roy, starring Kamal Haasan, Reena Roy, Kader Khan, Ranjeet, Jeevan. The film became a hit at the box office and was more successful in the big cities.

The film is also known for its super hit songs, especially "Nisha, Nisha, Nisha". The other songs "Sheeshe Ke Gharon Mein" and "Kitne Bhi Tu Kar Le Sitam" were also hits. R. D. Burman won his first Filmfare Best Music Director Award for Sanam Teri Kasam.

The film's storyline is somewhat similar to 1957 Shammi Kapoor-starrer Tumsa Nahin Dekha.

== Plot ==
Sunil Sharma (Kamal Haasan) aka Sunny is a playful young lad who lives with his mother. He is unemployed and uses his leisure time singing in many colleges in Bombay (now Mumbai). His father, Rammlal, went missing twenty years ago after he fatally injured a man by accident. Rammlal has now changed his identity to 'Manoharlal'. He is a successful millionaire in Shimla and takes care of his friend's daughter Nisha (Reena Roy).

Sunny's friend comes to Bombay to visit him, but is ragged by Nisha's girl gang due to a misunderstanding. To take 'revenge' for his friend's humiliation, Sunny pranks the girls by pretending to be a tour guide and promises to show them around Bombay. Instead, he lands them in a tricky situation and runs away. Nisha and her friends realise that Sunny is not a tour guide and that he has pranked them. In a fit of rage, the girls vandalise Sunny's friend's car.

Sunny gets a job opportunity from Shimla. With his mother's blessings, he leaves to Shimla. On the way, he stops at a hotel where Nisha and her friends are staying. The hotel keeper tricks people by giving the same room to two different people and collects the money from both parties. In this manner, Sunny accidentally enters Nisha's room. She thinks that he is stalking her and screams, thereby alerting everyone. The hotel manager apologizes to them, but Nisha develops a hatred toward Sunny.

After such hilarious encounters, Sunny finally reaches Shimla. Turns out that the job vacancy is at Manoharlal's home! Sunny requests Nisha not to complain about their previous fights, as it would cost him his job. Nisha is amused by his sudden change in behaviour and agrees to keep it a secret. Eventually, Sunny and Nisha fall in love with each other.

A criminal named Wilson gets to know that Manoharlal is alive and has become a millionaire in Shimla, and wants to seize his wealth. He hatches a plan and makes his son Robinson pretend to be Sunil Sharma and brings him to Manoharlal. Thinking that Robinson is his real son, Manoharlal is very happy and wants him to marry Nisha. One day, Robinson sees Sunny and Nisha embracing and immediately reports it to Manoharlal.

Manoharlal thinks that Sunny is pretending to love Nisha just for her wealth. He quickly gets Nisha engaged to Robinson, who is still posing to be Sunil Sharma. Sunny's mother writes him a letter, through which Wilson and Robinson realise that Sunny is the real Sunil Sharma. In the meantime, Robinson's girlfriend Reeta comes and asks him to marry her as her brother is very hostile to their relationship. Robinson uses this opportunity to get rid of Sunny completely.

He tells Sunny that Reeta is claiming to be his girlfriend. Sunny is shocked and denies any relationship with Reeta! Robinson tells him to go to Reeta's home to talk and clear the misunderstanding. Sunny agrees and goes to Reeta's home, only to find her lying dead in her wedding dress. Robinson quickly calls the police and makes it seem like Sunny has killed Reeta!

Nisha hears about this, but still trusts that Sunny would never do such a thing. She deciphers that something strange is going on. But despite her pleas, Manoharlal arranges her wedding with Robinson, still believing that he is his son Sunil. When Sunny's mother comes, Wilson's gang blackmail her and threaten to take Sunny's life if she exposed their evil plan.

Sunny's mother meets Nisha and tells her the truth about the situation, but begs her to do something because it involves the life of her estranged husband Manoharlal and son Sunny. Fearing for Sunny's life, Nisha reluctantly agrees to marry Robinson. During the wedding, Sunny arrives and stops the wedding from happening. Manoharlal thinks he is lying and hits him very badly, but Sunny's mother remains silent because she is threatened by the villains that they will kill Sunny if she tells the truth.

At the right time, the police inspector arrives with Reeta, who is alive and well. Turns out that Reeta didn't die that day, but was unconscious. She testifies against Robinson and his father Wilson and exposes their plan. Finding a way to escape, Wilson holds the gun to Sunny's mother and threatens to shoot her if anyone moves. Using her as a hostage, they escape and demand 2 million as ransom. With the help of a few friends and the police, Sunny and Nisha find their hideout and they nab the crooks.

In the end, the family is united. Manoharlal confesses his crime and surrenders to the police. He names Sunny as the heir to his property.

Sunny and Nisha are finally united.

== Cast ==
- Kamal Haasan as Sunil Sharma "Sunny"
- Reena Roy as Nisha
- Kader Khan as Ramlal Sharma / Manoharilal
- Ranjeet as Robinson
- Jeevan as Wilson
- Jagdeep as Banke Bihari Patnewala
- Seema Deo as Mrs. Sudha Sharma
- Viju Khote as Hotel Manager
- Guddi Maruti as Bulbuli
- Birbal as Raju Guide
- Raj Kishore as Waiter
- Bhagwan Dada as Eunuch Bride

== Production ==
Kamal Haasan, besides acting as the male lead, also choreographed one dance sequence in the film: "Yadhuvamsa Sudhambudhi Chandra". While filming a sequence at Juhu Beach, Reena Roy introduced Kamal Haasan to Sarika, who later went on to marry him.

== Release ==
The film was released on 14 May 1982. It was a box office success and had a theatrical run of 175 days. The film was later dubbed and released in Tamil-language as Paadagan during the early 1990s.

== Soundtrack ==
The soundtrack of Sanam Teri Kasam was composed by R. D. Burman. Lyrics for all songs were penned by Gulshan Bawra.

Hindi

Song	Singer
"Dekhta Hoon Koi Ladki"	Kishore Kumar
"Sheeshe Ke Gharon Mein"	Kishore Kumar
"Kitne Bhi Tu Kar Le Sitam" (duet)	Kishore Kumar, Asha Bhosle
"Kitne Bhi Tu Kar Le Sitam" (male)	Kishore Kumar
"Jaana, O Meri Jaana"	R. D. Burman
"Jaan-E-Jaan, O Meri Jaan-E-Jaan, Nisha Nisha Nisha"	R. D. Burman, Asha Bhosle
"Kitne Bhi Tu Kar Le Sitam" (female)	Asha Bhosle

Tamil

No.	Title	Length
1.	"Sundari Sundari Unakku"	4:12
2.	"Melavey Melavey"	4:25
3.	"Idhu Kadhal Nenjin"	3:48
4.	"Raja Eppovum Raja"	5:11
5.	"Kodi Minnal"	4:53
