= Benaam (1974 film) =

- Directed by: Narendra Bedi
- Written by: Narendra Bedi; Jayant Dharmadhikari; Kader Khan
- Produced by: Ranjit Virk
- Starring: Amitabh Bachchan; Moushumi Chatterjee; Madan Puri
- Cinematography: Kaka Thakur
- Edited by: Waman B. Bhosle; Gurudutt Shirali
- Music by: R. D. Burman
- Production companies: Filmalaya Studio; Mohan Studios; R.K. Studios; Rajkamal Studios; Shree Sound Studio
- Distributed by: Ranjit Films; Shemaroo Video Pvt. Ltd.
- Release date: 18 October 1974
- Running time: 117 minutes
- Country: India
- Language: Hindi

Benaam (lit. 'Nameless') is a 1974 Hindi-language crime thriller film directed and co-written by Narendra Bedi. The film stars Amitabh Bachchan, Moushumi Chatterjee and Prem Chopra. Madan Puri appears in a different role. The core plot loosely resembles Alfred Hitchcock's The Man Who Knew Too Much (1956).

The film was remade in Kannada as Thirugu Baana with Ambarish and Aarati reprising the roles played by Amitabh Bachchan and Moushumi Chatterjee.

== Plot ==
Sheela (Moushumi Chatterjee) and Amit Shrivastav (Amitabh Bachchan) are a married couple with a young son. One night on their way to a party, they witness a murder attempt on a press reporter. Amit admits the victim, who is in a critical condition, to a hospital. He also finds a torn part of an invitation at the place of the attempted murder which he pockets. Soon afterwards, Amit begins to receive anonymous threats to hand over the evidence.

When Amit does not comply, Amit and Sheela's son is kidnapped. An unknown voice starts blackmailing Amit into doing what that person dictates. The only way to save their child is to unravel the mystery of that person's identity. Amit, with the help of Inspector Jadhav, (Satyen Kappu) finally finds the culprit and saves his son.

== Cast ==
- Amitabh Bachchan as Amit Shrivastav
- Moushumi Chatterjee as Sheela Shrivastav
- Helen as Poonam
- Madan Puri as Gopal
- Iftekhar as Police Commissioner
- Satyen Kappu as Inspector Jadav
- Dhumal as Police Constable
- Shubha Khote as Chachi
- Jagdish Raj as Mr. Desai
- D.K. Sapru as Mr. Sharma
- Viju Khote as Salim
- Kader Khan as voice on the phone
- Prem Chopra as Mr Kishenlal
- Dev Kishen as Astrologer
- Rajpal as Tony, Amit's office colleague

== Soundtrack ==
Song	Singer	Raga
"Main Benaam Ho Gaya"	Narendra Chanchal	Ahir Bhairav
"Ek Din Hansana"	Lata Mangeshkar	
"Ek Din Hansana" (Short)	Lata Mangeshkar	
"Aa Raat Jati Hai, Chupke Se Mil Jaye Dono"	Mohammed Rafi, Asha Bhosle	
