= Doosri Sita =

- Poster
- Directed by: Gogi Anand
- Produced by: B. K. Khanna
- Starring: Jaya Bhaduri; Romesh Sharma
- Cinematography: K. K. Mahajan
- Edited by: Madhu Sinha
- Music by: R. D. Burman; Gulzar (lyrics)
- Release date: 1974
- Country: India
- Language: Hindi

Doosri Sita is a 1974 Bollywood drama film directed by Gogi Anand. It stars Jaya Bhaduri in lead role. The music was composed by R. D. Burman.

== Cast ==
- Jaya Bhaduri as Seeta Wagle
- Romesh Sharma as Ramesh
- Raza Murad as Public Prosecutor
- A. K. Hangal as Babulal Wagle
- Satyen Kappu
- Mohan Choti
- Lalita Pawar

== Crew ==
- Director – Gogi Anand
- Producer – B. K. Khanna
- Cinematographer – K. K. Mahajan
- Editor – Madhu Sinha
- Music Director – R. D. Burman
- Lyricist – Gulzar

== Music ==
The music was composed by R.D.Burman with lyrics by Gulzar

Song	Singer
"Din Ja Rahe Hai"	Lata Mangeshkar
"Aayi Re Aayi"	Asha Bhosle
"Tu Jahan Mile Mujhe"	Asha Bhosle
"Tu Jahan Mile Mujhe"	Nitin Mukesh
