= Rafoo Chakkar =

1975 Indian Hindi-language comedy film

- Directed by: Narender Bedi
- Written by: Kader Khan (dialogues)
- Screenplay by: K. K. Shukla
- Story by: Jayant Dharmadhikari
- Produced by: I. A. Nadiadwala
- Starring: Rishi Kapoor; Neetu Singh; Madan Puri; Asrani; Rajendranath; Paintal
- Cinematography: Peter Pereira
- Edited by: Babubhai Thakkar
- Music by: Kalyanji Anandji
- Release date: 1 October 1975
- Country: India
- Language: Hindi

Rafoo Chakkar is a 1975 Indian Hindi-language comedy film produced by I. A. Nadiadwala and directed by Narender Bedi. The film was adapted from the 1959 American film Some Like It Hot (based on the 1935 French film Fanfare of Love).

The film stars Rishi Kapoor and Neetu Singh. Other actors include Paintal, Bindu and Madan Puri, along with Rajindernath, Asrani and Bhagwan. The music was composed by Kalyanji Anandji.

== Plot ==
Two out-of-work musicians (Rishi Kapoor and Paintal) witness a murder and are spotted by the villains. In order to save themselves, they decide to disguise themselves as girls and hop on to a train to Jammu and Kashmir with other girls in a singing band, where they met Neetu Singh, Bindoo and Asrani. The plot twists when band manager falls in love with the 'girl' Paintal, and Rishi Kapoor tries to impress Neetu Singh by pretending to be an oil tycoon named Esso. At the end of the film, the male musicians' real identities are revealed. However, the romantic pairs remain intact by the end credits, including Rajindernath and Paintal. The film ends with the same line as Some Like it Hot: "Nobody's perfect!"

== Cast ==
- Rishi Kapoor as Dev / Devi
- Neetu Singh as Ritu
- Rajinder Nath as Salma's Admirer
- Faryal as In-charge of girls' band
- Asrani as Kanhaiyalal Chaturvedi
- Paintal as Salim/Salma
- Mumtaz Begum as Salim's Mother
- Madan Puri as Prakash
- Viju Khote as Prakash's security guard
- Anwar Hussain as Ranjit
- Sulochana as Shanti
- Shetty as Raka
- Bhagwan as S. Manglani's secretary
- Jankidas as Member of S. Manglani group
- Mohan Sherry as Duo
- Mac Mohan
- M. Rajan as Member of S. Manglani group
- Hiralal as Member of S. Manglani group
- Lalita Kumari as Ritu's Aunt
- Narendra Nath as Himself
- Bachan Singh as Watchman
- Bhushan Tiwari as Police Informer

== Soundtrack ==
All lyrics are written by Gulshan Bawra; all music is composed by Kalyanji Anandji

Songs
No.	Title	Playback	Length
1.	"Ae Zamane Tu Kar Le Sitam Pe Sitam"	Kanchan
2.	"Bhajan Bina Chain Na Aaye"	Kanchan, Aziz Nazan Qawwal
3.	"Chhuk Chhuk"	Usha Mangeshkar, Asha Bhosle, Mahesh Kumar
4.	"Dil De Na"	Usha Mangeshkar, Kanchan
5.	"Kisi Pe Dil Agar Aa Jaye To"	Shailender Singh, Asha Bhosle
6.	"Title Music" (Rafoo Chakkar)	—
7.	"Tum Ko Mere Dil Ne Pukara""	Shailender Singh, Kanchan

== Awards and nominations ==
Year	Nominee / work	Award	Result
1976	Asrani	Filmfare Best Comedian Award	Nominated
