= Pyar Ke Kabil =

- Directed by: Anil Ganguly
- Produced by: Suresh K Grover
- Starring: Rishi Kapoor; Padmini Kolhapure
- Music by: Bappi Lahiri
- Release date: 21 February 1987
- Country: India
- Language: Hindi

Pyar Ke Kabil is a 1987 Indian Bollywood film directed by Anil Ganguly and produced by Suresh Grover. It stars Rishi Kapoor and Padmini Kolhapure, with Bindu, Utpal Dutt and Deven Verma in supporting roles. It is a loose copy of 1968 film Do Kaliyan, starring Biswajeet and Mala Sinha.

== Cast ==
- Rishi Kapoor ... Amar Kapoor
- Padmini Kolhapure ... Sangeeta Kapoor
- Bindu ... Rukmani
- Utpal Dutt ... Rukmini's Husband
- Deven Verma ... Nandkishore Govardhan
- Tiku Talsania
- Gulshan Grover ... Kallu Kalan Kaalia "Kalidas"
- Asha Sachdev ... Chanchal (Dance Teacher)
- Shubha Khote ... Komal (Chanchal's Mother)

== Soundtrack ==
Lyrics: Indeevar

Song	Singer
"Red Light, No Green Light"	Kishore Kumar
"Tere Jaisa Mukhda (Male)"	Kishore Kumar
"Tere Jaisa Mukhda"	S. Janaki
"Bachche To Bhagwaan Ki"	S. Janaki
"Aaj Ki Raat"	Asha Bhosle
"Meri Pyari Baby"	Asha Bhosle
