= Jhoota Kahin Ka =

1979 Indian film by Ravi Tandon

- Directed by: Ravi Tandon
- Produced by: Ravi Malhotra
- Starring: Rishi Kapoor; Neetu Singh
- Music by: Rahul Dev Burman
- Production company: R. M. Films
- Release date: 30 March 1979
- Country: India
- Language: Hindi

Jhoota Kahin Ka is a 1979 Bollywood romantic comedy drama film directed by Ravi Tandon. It stars Rishi Kapoor and Neetu Singh in the lead roles. The film was a critical and commercial success.

== Plot ==
The Rai family consists of four: father, mother Shanti, and two sons, Ajay and Vijay. Traveling on a ship, they run into a severe storm, the ship capsizes and the family gets separated. While Ajay and his mother stay together, Rai is separate, and so is Vijay. Wealthy Jagatnarayan Khanna rescues Rai, takes him home, ensures that he is treated well, and makes him a business partner. Years later, the Rai sons have grown up. Ajay is a lowly motor mechanic working in Pinto's Garage, but leads a parallel life as a lying conman Casanova, and dreams of making it big with a wealthy woman named Sheetal Khanna. Vijay is now known as Vikram, works for Sheetal Khanna, and hopes to marry her one-day, but also has an affair with a gorgeous woman named Mala. When Mala gets pregnant, Vikram refuses to marry her and an argument ensues. Shortly thereafter, Mala is killed and Vikram gets blackmailed by a man named Prem, who claims he saw Vikram kill her. When Vikram and Prem find out that Sheetal might marry Ajay, they team up to plot against him - and Ajay's lies and dual life make it easy for them to frame him.

== Cast ==
- Rishi Kapoor as Ajay Rai
- Neetu Singh as Anita Verma / Sheetal Khanna
- Rakesh Roshan as Vijay Rai / Vikram
- Om Shivpuri as Rai
- Prem Chopra as Prem
- Preeti Ganguli as Paro
- Iftekhar as Police Inspector Shyam Kumar
- Pinchoo Kapoor as Jagatnarayan Khanna
- Satyendra Kapoor as Garage Owner Pinto
- Javed Khan as Jagjit
- Indrani Mukherjee as Mrs. Shanti Rai
- Keshto Mukherjee as Rahim
- Neelima as Anita Verma
- Yunus Parvez as Razdan
- Ram Sethi as Hotel Waiter
- Hari Shivdasani as Car Owner Faujiram (uncredited)
- Helen as Cabaret Dancer
- Dara Singh as Body Builder and dance partner in song "Dekho Mera Jaadu"
- Gauri Verma as Mala

== Soundtrack ==
R. M. Films' Jhoota Kahin Ka

Soundtrack album by R. D. Burman
- Released: 1979
- Genre: Bollywood music; Feature film soundtrack
- Language: Hindi
- Label: Gramophone Company of India (EMI)

The music was composed by R. D. Burman, the lyricist was Gulshan Bawra.

Song	Singer(s)
"Dil Men Jo Mere"	Kishore Kumar, Rishi Kapoor, chorus
"Barah Baje Ki Suiyon Jaise"	Kishore Kumar, Asha Bhosle
"Jeevan Ke Har Mod"	Kishore Kumar, Asha Bhosle, chorus
"Dekho Mera Jaadoo"	Asha Bhosle
"Jhoota Kahin Ka"	Asha Bhosle
