= Maha Chor =

- Directed by: Narendra Bedi
- Written by: Kader Khan
- Produced by: Narendra Bedi
- Starring: Rajesh Khanna; Neetu Singh; Prem Chopra; Aruna Irani; Manmohan; Manorama; Anwar Hussain; Kamini Kaushal; Viju Khote
- Music by: R.D.Burman
- Release date: 1 January 1976
- Country: India
- Language: Hindi

Maha Chor (transl. The Biggest Thief) is a 1976 Hindi-language heist action comedy film directed by Narendra Bedi, starring Rajesh Khanna in the lead role, paired opposite Neetu Singh for the very first time. The film had music by R.D. Burman and the lyricist whom Rajesh Khanna preferred for his films; Anand Bakshi.

The film is primarily set in Bombay. An orphan boy has been raised by the people of a local colony, and has learned to steal in order to financially help them. While working for a ruthless businessman, the boy meets the princess of Raigadh and develops feeling for her. The businessman convinces the boy to pose as a disappeared prince, based on his resemblance to the prince.

== Plot ==
Raju is an orphan who is brought up by the people of a colony in the Juhu area of Bombay. He lives as a son of all residents of the colony and helps them with their financial needs by stealing and because of this, he is often jailed for some months. He is affectionately called "Raju" by Hindus and "Khan" by Muslims. Prem Singh intends to build a hotel in the colony and compels people to vacate the place or pay Rs. 10000 as rent. Actually, the land belongs to Neetu, the princess of Raigadh. Prem urges Neetu to marry him so that he can own the land of Juhu. But Neetu resists the proposal. Neetu's uncle manages to get the photograph of the prince and sends it to Raj Matha. Prince Rajeshwar had been kidnapped by Prem's mother in his childhood to prevent him from inheriting the wealth of Raigadh palace and to make her son the heir for it.

Raju steals a car of Prem Singh and gets caught when he tries to sell his car back to him. Seeing his intelligent innocence, he first uses him to transport smuggled kinds of stuff to Raigadh in the car. Neetu escapes from Prem and hides at the back of the car. While Raju drives towards to Raigadh, he finds her and takes her along with him. On the way, though they both fight, they develop feelings for each other. Raju, who thinks he is not eligible for the princess, tries to kill his feelings.

Prem recognizes the identity of lost Prince Rajeshwar in Raju. So he insists upon Raju to act like him in the palace, but Raju refuses as he cannot serve several years of jail as his colony people need him. Prem sets fire to the colony and this angers Raju. So he sets off to the palace where, without any effort, gets accepted by the Queen as Prince Rajeshwar, in spite of his repeated denials. The Queen identifies him through his photograph, burnt hand (actually he got burnt in the fire set in the colony) and the finger print of the Prince. But the astrologer who is working for Prem lies to the Queen that he is the real prince, thinking Raju is the man sent by Prem.

Raju was crowned as Prince Rajeshwar. The real prince is under the custody of Prem's mother, who is still childlike, playing with toys and putting his thumb in his mouth like a toddler. Raju captures Prem, arrests him, and puts him in the palace prison. Thakur Singh, who wants to be the actual heir, finds that Prem is his own son. Prem reveals to his father that he is not the real prince, but is sent by him. Thakur Singh reveals this to all, but he is not believed by anybody as he has no proof for his statement. Raju is moved by the motherly love of the queen and so he wants to leave the palace, unwilling to deceive and disappoint her, but stays on the compulsion of Neetu as she insists that Raj Mata is smiling only on his arrival. Raju swears to stay and find out the real prince. Meanwhile, the Queen finds out the truth and asks him to get out, but is shot by Thakur Singh and blames Raju for the shooting. Raju is arrested, but he escapes. Prem plans to kill Raju when he comes to the hospital to visit Rajmata. But Raju disguises himself as Dr. Muthuswamy, a man from Madras and donates the rare blood AB negative to the queen and saves her.

Raju finds out the real Prince Rajeshwar, who is under the custody of Prem and rescues him. Prem, his mother and Thakur Singh are arrested. The Queen finally re-unites with her son. She also unites Neetu with Raju as Neetu actually loves him.

== Cast ==
- Rajesh Khanna in dual role as
  - Raju Khan / Johnny Fernandes
  - Rajeshwar A. Singh
- Neetu Singh as Neetu
- Prem Chopra as Prem D. Singh
- Aruna Irani as Rani
- Kamini Kaushal as Mrs. Ajay Singh "Rani Maa"
- Manorama as Nirmala
- Anwar Hussain as Thakur Dilip Singh
- Krishan Dhawan as Diwanji
- Manmohan as Prem's goon (as Man Mohan)
- Rajan Haksar as Thakur Rajan Singh
- Lollypop as Chimpu (as Master Lollypop)
- Viju Khote as Prem's goon
- Rajpal
- Birbal
- Narbada Shankar

== Music ==
All songs were penned by Anand Bakshi.

- "Hindu Hoon Main, Na Musalman Hoon" - Kishore Kumar
- "Main Tumse Pyar Karti Hoon" - Kishore Kumar, Lata Mangeshkar
- "Mera Naam Yaaron Maha Chor Hai" - Kishore Kumar
- "Mithi Mithi Ankhiyon Se Man Bhar De" - Kishore Kumar, Asha Bhosle
- "Sun Banto Baat Meri" - Asha Bhosle, Anand Bakshi
- "Tu Kya Mujhe Barbaad Karega" - Lata Mangeshkar
