= Khote Sikkay =

- film poster
- Directed by: Narendra Bedi
- Written by: Narendra Bedi; Satish Bhatanagar (dialogues)
- Produced by: N D Kothari
- Starring: Feroz Khan; Danny Denzongpa; Ranjeet; Ajit; Rehana Sultan
- Cinematography: Peter Pereira
- Edited by: B S Glaad
- Music by: R. D. Burman
- Distributed by: Mewar Films
- Release date: 20 February 1974
- Running time: 132 minutes
- Country: India
- Language: Hindi

Khote Sikkay (transl. Fake Coins) is a 1974 Indian Hindi-language dacoit Western film directed by Narendra Bedi, starring Feroz Khan and Danny Denzongpa as part of a gang hired by a villager to save his village from dacoits. The film also stars Rehana Sultan, Ranjeet, Leela Mishra, Paintal, Ajit, and Ranjeet in supporting roles. The lyrics of the music were penned by Majrooh Sultanpuri, and the music was given by R.D. Burman.

It was inspired by the Western genre, complete with horses and ponchos. It has a similar plot to Akira Kurosawa's Seven Samurai, as well as The Magnificent Seven. Feroz Khan's character is similar to the Man with No Name stock characters in Kurosawa's Yojimbo and Sergio Leone's Dollars Trilogy. The story of the film Sholay is said to be inspired by this film. Rajesh Khanna was offered the movie first, but he did not have the dates and thus Feroz Khan was signed.

== Plot ==
False currency is the current currency in our society. This is the exciting story of those five adventurous young men who earn their livelihood in the city by doing all kinds of odd and unusual jobs. All five of them are strikingly different specimens of humanity. Each one of them is a master of his own peculiar art. Each one of them has a unique style, but they are all together. Dacoit Junga's exploits have created panic and terror in the village. He murders Ramu's father. Ramu travels alone from the village to the city to bring his cousin Jaggu to the village. Jaggu happens to be one of those five "fake coins". All five of them, after mutual consultation plan to go to Ramu's village. These happy-go-lucky five young men have their first encounter with Janga's brother and associates at the premises of the singing-dancing girl Rani. After the encounter, these five are rewarded with prizes which the police had announced for anyone who could deal with these Dacoits. With that prize money, they buy weapons to ensure the safety and security of the village. Another man Feroze Khan obsessed with the idea of avenging his father's murder, shadows Junga day and night. There is a soft corner in his heart for the girl named Rani. In the village, Feroze Khan clashes with these five young men, but ultimately he also joins them in the pursuit of a common goal. However, Feroze has decided that he alone will square his account with Junga and will not allow anyone else to settle the score for him. Having settled in the village, these five young men now channel all their activities into the service of the village community. The village people and the head man of the village ultimately stand bail for these five young men and plead with the authorities that they are given a chance to reform themselves. After the reformation, these five young men become the finest assets of the village and the five "fake coins" of the city turn into genuine gold for the village. The teenage widowed daughter-in-law of the head man of the village spends her life with her little child, groaning under the cruel treatment in the house of her mother-in-law. Jaggu succeeds in welcoming her one-day into his arms and the shelter of his love. These five young men band together to work against the Dacoits in the interest of the village. After uniting the villages, these five young men put up a bold fight with the Dacoits. How far they succeed and to what extent their courage and idealism are able to thwart the conspiracy of the Dacoits forms the thrilling climax that is the very soul of "KHOTTE SIKKAY".

== Cast ==
- Feroz Khan as horse rider in black
- Rehana Sultan as Paro/Rani
- Alka as Reeta
- Danny Denzongpa as Danny
- Ranjeet as Salim
- Narendra Nath as Jaggu
- Madhu Chhanda as Madhu
- Sudhir as Bhaggu
- Paintal as Ramu
- Ajit as Janga
- Alankar Joshi (Master Alankar)
- Leela Mishra as Madhu's Mother-in-law
- Murad as Bahadur
- Kamal Kapoor as Police Commissioner
- Satyen Kappu as Judge
- Bhushan Tiwari as Dacoit
- Viju Khote as Chandu, the villager on cycle
- Mohan Baggad as a in white t-shirt fight with Narendar Nath
- Nathuram as a (Dwarf man) in village
- Uma Khosla as a village chodry wife
- Kunwar Ajit as Jeet. (The actor is brother of Darmander real life )
- Sopariwala as Carmichael restaurant owner
- Dev Kishan as Police Inspector in village
- V. Gopal as old army hawaldar Kishanlal
- Gurbachan Singh as a police man

== Soundtrack ==
The music was composed by R. D. Burman and lyrics penned by Majrooh Sultanpuri.

Song	Singer
"Jeevan Mein Tu Darna Nahin (Part 1)"	Kishore Kumar
"Jeevan Mein Tu Darna Nahin (Part 2)"	Kishore Kumar
"Jeevan Mein Tu Darna Nahin (Part 3)"	Kishore Kumar
"Pyari Pyari Suratwale, Hay Mere Allah Itne Saare"	Usha Mangeshkar, Asha Bhonsle
"Maar Sutiya, Maar Sutiya"	Asha Bhonsle

== Trivia ==
- Kunwar Ajit, brother of actor Dharmendra plays role of Jeet in the movie.
- The scene where goons threaten Jaggu is shot near Veronica Road in Bandra, Mumbai.
- In one scene actress Alka is seen reading a novel 'A plane is missing' (1970) which is a later edition of original novel 'President's plane is missing (1967)' by Robert Serling.
- The background score at Feroz Khan's entry is the popular tune from Hollywood movie 'For a few dollars more'.
