= Chala Murari Hero Banne =

- Film poster
- Directed by: Asrani
- Produced by: Surinder Kumar Sharma
- Starring: Asrani; Bindiya Goswami; Ashok Kumar; Prem Nath
- Narrated by: Ashok Kumar
- Music by: R. D. Burman
- Production company: Mehboob Studios
- Release date: 11 November 1977
- Country: India
- Language: Hindi

Chala Murari Hero Banne (lit. 'Murari Goes To Become A Hero') is a 1977 Indian Hindi-language comedy film directed by and starring Asrani, Bindiya Goswami and Ashok Kumar in lead roles.

== Plot ==
Murari dreams of becoming an actor, but his Dad (A.K. Hangal), who runs a cloth shop, wants him to help in the shop. Murari runs away from home and catches a train to Mumbai. On his journey, he meets a teacher who says he knows Raj Kapoor. Murari comes to Mumbai, lives in a chawl, struggles a bit and becomes a successful and rich actor. Then comes a twist in his life; he gets accused in scandals, and his love interest, (Bindiya Goswami), leaves him. Eventually, he proves himself innocent and they reunite and marry.

== Cast ==
- G. Asrani as Murari/Amit
- Bindiya Goswami as Mary
- Ashok Kumar
- Prem Nath
- Simi Garewal
- Bindu
- Paintal
- Jagdeep
- Keshto Mukherjee as Abdul
- Satyendra Kapoor as Dubey/Lyricist

=== Guest appearances ===
The film has many Special appearances including:

- Dharmendra
- Hema Malini
- Premnath
- Amitabh Bachchan
- A.K. Hangal as Murari's father
- Keshto Mukherjee
- Jagdeep
- Ashok Kumar
- Rishi Kapoor
- Neetu Singh
- Paintal as Peter
- David Abraham Cheulkar as Mary's father
- Sunil Dutt
- Kishore Kumar
- Nasir Hussain
- Helen
- Atal Bihari Vajpayee as Self
- Lal Krishna Advani as Self
- Harindranath Chattopadhyaya as himself

== Music ==
Music was composed by R. D. Burman and lyrics were penned by Yogesh.

1. "Naa Janey Din Kaise Jivan Me Aaye Hain" - Kishore Kumar
2. "Khoye Ho Aakhir Kis Bekhudi Me" - Asha Bhosle
3. "Teri Kathputli Hun Naccne Nikli Hu" - Lata Mangeshkar
4. "Do Pal Ki Hey Ye Zindagani" - Asha Bhosle
5. "Haathon Me Haath Hum Lekar" - Lata Mangeshkar
6. "Na Jane Din Kaise Jivan Me Aaye Hai" (II) - Kishore Kumar
7. "Pas Aao Na" - Asha Bhosle, Simi Garewal

== See also ==
- Main Madhuri Dixit Banna Chahti Hoon, 2003 Hindi film about a small-town woman aspiring to join Bollywood film industry.
