= Asrani =

Indian actor and filmmaker (1941–2025)

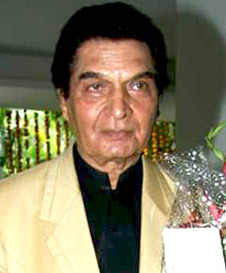
- Asrani in 2012
- Born: Govardhan Kumar Asrani; 1 January 1941; Jaipur, Jaipur State, British India (present-day Rajasthan, India)
- Died: 20 October 2025 (aged 84); Mumbai, Maharashtra, India
- Education: Rajasthan College; FTII, Pune
- Occupations: Actor; film director; film producer; singer
- Years active: 1967–2025
- Spouse: Manju Bansal
- Awards: 2 awards, 11 nominations; Filmfare Award for Best Comedian

Govardhan Kumar Asrani, referred to as Asrani in the film industry (1 January 1941 – 20 October 2025) was an Indian actor and film director. His career in Indian cinema spanned over five decades, during which he appeared in over 350 Hindi and Gujarati films. Asrani worked in lead, character, comedic, and supporting roles. He is particularly noted for his role as the Jailor in Sholay, caricaturing Hitler, and Amadavad no Rikshavaro and for his appearances in 25 films with Rajesh Khanna as the lead actor between 1972 and 1991.

In Hindi cinema, he appeared in several comic roles from 1966 to 2014 and frequently portrayed the close friend of the lead actor in films between 1972 and 1995. He appeared in multiple films directed by Hrishikesh Mukherjee and Priyadarshan. In some Hindi films, including Chala Murari Hero Banne and Salaam Memsaab, he played the lead role. In Gujarati films, he acted as the lead from 1972 to 1984 and performed character roles from 1985 to 2012. He directed six films between 1974 and 1997.

== Early life ==
Govardhan Kumar Asrani was born into a middle-class, Sindhi Hindu family in Jaipur. His father had a carpet shop. He has four sisters and three brothers: two elder and one younger. Asrani was disinterested in business and weak in mathematics. He completed his matriculation from St Xavier's School, Jaipur and did his graduation from Rajasthan College, Jaipur. He simultaneously worked as a voice artist at All India Radio, Jaipur, to pay for his education.

He married actress Manju Bansal, with whom he fell in love while working together in films like Aaj Ki Taaza Khabar and Namak Haram. After they wed, the couple acted in Tapasya, Chandi Sona, Jaan-E-Bahaar, Jurmana, Nalayak, Sarkari Mehmaan, Narad Vivah and Chor Sipahee. In Aaj Ki Taaza Khabar, Asrani played Champak Boomia / Amit Desai and Manju played Kesari Desai. For this role Asrani won the Filmfare Award for Best Comedian. Later the couple acted in Hum Nahin Sudhrenge, a home production directed by Asrani in 1980.

== Career ==
Asrani began to learn acting from Sahitya Kalbhai Thakkar from 1960 to 1962. In 1962, he travelled to Mumbai to seek opportunities to act. In 1963, on an accidental meeting with Kishore Sahu and Hrishikesh Mukherjee, they advised him to learn acting professionally.

In 1964 Asrani joined the Film Institute in Pune and finished his course in 1966. He got his first break in Hindi films playing the friend of actor Biswajeet in the film Hare Kaanch Ki Choodiyan in 1967. In the film institute he had impressed many and made his acting break as a hero in 1967 with a Gujarati movie opposite budding actress Waheeda (not Waheeda Rahman; the Hindi actress). He acted in four other movies, mainly as actor or supporting actor, in Gujarati from 1967 to 1969. He did not get many offers from the Hindi film industry between 1967 and 1969. His old advisor, Hrishikesh Mukherjee, then gave him the role of supporting actor in the film Satyakam in 1969. He got noticed then in the film Mere Apne. From 1971, he started getting more offers as the main comedian in films or as the close friend of the lead actor.

Directors like Mukherjee, Atma Ram, and Gulzar repeatedly cast him in the period 1971–1974, and his work got noticed through these films. These roles set the tone for a number of supporting and comic roles in his career. In the 1970s his demand was at its peak as he appeared in 101 films from 1970 to 1979. Though initially Rajesh Khanna and Asrani had met only on the sets of Bawarchi, they became close friends after Namak Haraam, after which for comic roles Khanna insisted the producers and directors make Asrani a part of his films. Asrani worked in 25 films with Khanna from 1972 to 1991, from Bawarchi (1972) to Ghar Parivaar (1991).

His most memorable works as supporting actor from 1970 to 1979 are in Mere Apne, Koshish, Bawarchi, Parichay, Abhimaan, Mehbooba, Palkon Ki Chhaon Mein, Do Ladke Dono Kadke and Bandish. He played the lead hero in Chala Murari Hero Banne, a Hindi film he wrote and directed in 1977.

His notable roles as a comedian from the 1970s are in Aaj Ki Taaza Khabar, Roti, Prem Nagar, Chupke Chupke, Chhoti Si Baat, Rafoo Chakkar, Sholay, Balika Badhu, Fakira, Anurodh, Chhailla Babu, Charas, Phaansi, Dillagi, Heeralal Pannalal, Pati Patni Aur Woh and Hamare Tumhare.

Though he had played the supporting character in many films, he played a serious role for the first time in Khoon Pasina. He did off beat roles like that of the evil brother's role in Koshish (1972), the double role of a hippie and villager in L. V. Prasad's Bidaai (1974), a beedi and ganji sporting wastrel in Hrishikesh Mukherjee's Chaitali (1975), a romantic in B. R. Chopra's Nikaah (1982) who sang a qawwali like yesteryear actor Yakub and played a pimp in K. S. Prakash Rao's Prem Nagar (1974).Later he played antagonist roles in Ab Kya Hoga and Teri Meherbaniyan.

He was a very popular public figure in the 1970s and was one of Rajesh Khanna's close friends. He became a regular feature in films produced by D. Ramanaidu and those movies directed by Hrishikesh Mukherjee, B. R. Chopra, K. Bapaiah, Narayana Rao Dasari, K. Raghavendra Rao, Basu Chatterjee in 1972 to 1992.

He won the Filmfare Award for Best Comedian for his performances in Aaj Ki Taaza Khabar in 1974 and for Balika Badhu in 1977.

In 1974, Asrani directed his first movie in Gujarati with himself as the hero, and the song "Hu Amdavad No Rikshawalo" sung by Kishore Kumar was picturised on Asrani. Songs picturised on Asrani and sung by Kishore in Hindi are "Achcha Chaloji Baba Maaf Kardo" from Hamare Tumhare, "Pyar Main Karoonga" from Yeh Kaisa Insaaf. "Mannu Bhai Motor Chali Pam" was sung by him with Kishore Kumar and was picturised on Rishi Kapoor and him, in Phool Khile Hain Gulshan Gulshan in 1978.

In the 1980s, he acted in 107 Hindi films. Asrani holds the record for appearing as a character actor/comedian in the most Hindi films in a decade – 101 in the 1970s and 107 in the 1980s. Unlike his roles in 1970 to 1984 which were pivotal to the plot, most of his roles from 1985 to 1993 were very minor mainly because the concept of a comedian was being phased out and heroes preferred to do their own comedy and action films were more popular in the period from 1985 to 1994. In the 1980s his memorable performances were in Hamari Bahu Alka, Ek Hi Bhool, Yeh Kaisa Insaf, Kaamchor, Agar Tum Na Hote, Asha Jyoti, Maqsad, Main Intequam Loonga, Love 86 and Biwi Ho To Aisi.

In the films produced by South Indian production houses films and those directed by T. Rama Rao, K. Raghavendra Rao, K. Bapaiah, Narayana Rao Dasari, the trio of Asrani-Kader Khan-Shakti Kapoor were regular from 1982 to 1998 and boosted the popularity of the trio.

In 1982, Asrani set up a small Gujarati production company with fellow artistes Dinesh Hingoo, Harish Patel and Salim Parvez (son of famous supporting actor Yunus Parvez). The company dissolved in 1996 with a large profit. Asrani also invested in clothing and acted as investor for other actors, until 1991 when he lost a lot of money. From 1988 to 1993, he was a director for the Film Institute in Pune. In the 1990s he did only 73 Hindi movies due to lack of good scope for him to perform. Muqabla (1993) saw him in a serious role after a long time.

Simultaneously he kept working in Gujarati films in the 1970s and 1980s as a lead hero and achieved success as the lead protagonist in Amdavad No Rikshawalo, Saat Qaidi, Sansar Chakra, Pankhi No Malo, Jugal Jodi, Maa Baap, Chel Chabilo Gujarati. From the 1990s he played as a comedian or supporting actor in Gujarati films like Mota Ghar Ni Vahu, Piyu Gayo Pardesh, and Baap Dhamal Dikhra.

D. Ramanaidu gave a pivotal role to Asrani in Taqdeerwala in 1995 and once again comedy movies were being made from there on. Asrani started getting good roles in films directed by David Dhawan and Priyadarshan from 1993 until 2012. His most memorable performances as a comedian from the 1990s are in Jo Jeeta Wohi Sikandar, Gardish, Taqdeerwala, Gharwali Baharwali, Bade Miyan Chote Miyan and Hero Hindustani.

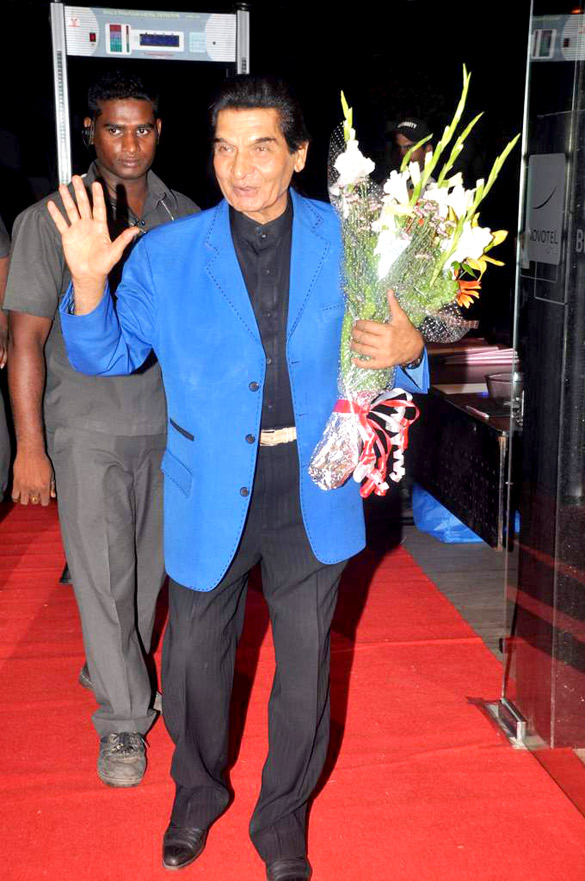
Asrani at the launch of It's Only Cinema magazine

The 2000s saw Asrani in a number of films like Hera Pheri, Chup Chup Ke, Hulchul, Deewane Huye Paagal, Garam Masala, Dhamaal, Malamaal Weekly, Bhagam Bhag, Bhool Bhulaiyaa, De Dana Dan, Bol Bachchan and Kamaal Dhamaal Malamaal. He appeared in a serious role in Kyun Ki. He was an integral part of comedies by Sajid Nadiadwala and Priyadarshan post-2000.

Asrani in 2018 played the role of Mikesh's grandfather in the popular web series Permanent Roommates. He also played the role of Director General of Police (DGP) in the serial Partners Trouble Ho Gayi Double.

Asrani acted as Narada in the 1985 Doordarshan TV serial Natkhat Narad. Some of his co-stars were Jayshree T. and Vikram Gokhale.

His obituary in The Hindu stated: "Versatility was his middle name as he transcended the typical sidekick stereotype to become perfect foil for the lead character, blending slapstick with subtle satire and dramatic depth. Be it Rajesh Khanna, Amitabh Bachchan or Jeetendra, Asrani played a definitive role in the myth making of several matinee idols of the 1970s and 1980s."

== Death ==
Asrani was admitted to Lilavati Hospital And Research Centre in Juhu, Mumbai, on 16 October 2025, with breathing issues. He died in the hospital at 3:00 PM on 20 October, due to fluid accumulation in his lungs. He was 84. His last rites were performed at Santacruz Crematorium with family members in attendance.

Upon the release of Ikkis on 1 January 2026, tributes were paid to Asrani along with his Sholay and Chupke Chupke co-star Dharmendra, who died on 24 November 2025. His final film appearance was Haiwaan (2026), which released on 11 September 2026.

== Selected filmography ==
=== As actor ===
Year	Title	Role	Notes	Ref.
1966	Hum Kahan Ja Rahe Hain	College student	Debut film role	
1967	Hare Kanch Ki Chooriyan	Tripathi		
1969	Satyakam	Peter		
1969	Umang			
1970	Pushpanjali			
1971	Guddi	Kundan		
1971	Mere Apne	Raghunath		
1971	Memsaab			
1971	Banphool			
1972	Piya Ka Ghar			
1972	Bawarchi	Vishwanath Sharma/Babbu		
1972	Parichay	Narayan		
1972	Seeta Aur Geeta	Laughing Doctor		
1972	Koshish	Kanu		
1972	Raaste Kaa Patthar			
1972	Sabse Bada Sukh			
1972	Yeh Gulistan Hamara			
1972	Shor			
1972	Shaadi Ke Baad			
1973	Anhonee			
1973	Anamika	Hanuman Singh		
1973	Abhimaan	Chander Kripalani		
1973	Namak Haraam	Dhondu, Shyama's brother		
1973	Shareef Budmaash			
1973	Chhaalia			
1973	Agni Rekha			
1973	Achanak			
1974	Chor Machaye Shor			
1974	Aap Ki Kasam	Dr. Ghad-Ghad Singhwala		
1974	Prem Nagar			
1974	Paap Aur Punya			
1974	Trimurti			
1974	Ajnabee	Chetan Kumar		
1974	Bidaai	Murli/Bhaskar		
1974	Roti			
1974	Paise Ki Gudiya			
1974	Humshakal			
1974	Duniya Ka Mela			
1974	Charitraheen			
1975	Apne Rang Hazaar			
1975	Rafoo Chakkar	Kanhaiyalal Chaturvedi		
1975	Chupke Chupke	Prashant Shrivastav		
1975	Kushboo			
1975	Chhoti Si Baat	Nagesh		
1975	Aakraman			
1975	Mili	Drunkard (Guest Appearance)		
1975	Sholay	Jailor		
1975	Chaitali			
1975	Umar Qaid			
1975	Uljhan			
1975	Sunehra Samsar			
1975	Raaja			
1975	Mazaaq			
1976	Chhoti Si Baat			
1976	Bhanwar			
1976	Charas			
1976	Mehbooba			
1976	Balika Badhu	Sharat		
1976	Fakira			
1976	Hera Pheri			
1976	Udhar Ka Sindur			
1976	Aap Beati			
1976	Laila Majnu			
1976	Tapasya	Vinod Sinha		
1976	Barood			
1977	Huntewali 77			
1977	Duniyadari			
1977	Kalabaaz	Changu		
1977	Dream Girl			
1977	Khoon Pasina			
1977	Anurodh			
1977	Chandi Sona			
1977	Alaap	Ganesh (Ganeshi)		
1977	Chhailla Babu			
1977	Karm			
1977	Hira Aur Patthar			
1977	Kotwal Saab			
1977	Aap Ki Khatir			
1977	Chalta Purza			
1977	Palkon Ki Chhaon Mein			
1977	Chala Murari Hero Banne	Murari	Director	
1977	Saheb Bahadur			
1977	Kasam Khoon Ki			
1977	Jagriti			
1977	Chor Sipahae			
1977	Chakkar Pe Chakkar			
1977	Ab Kya Hoga			
1978	Chamatkaar			
1978	Daaku Aur Jawan			
1978	Dillagi			
1978	Heeralaal Pannalaal			
1978	Mota Gharni Vahu		Gujarati film	
1978	Phool Khile Hain Gulshan Gulshan			
1978	Pati Patni Aur Woh	Abdul Karim Durrani		
1978	Pal Do Pal Ka Saath			
1978	Badalte Rishtey	Anup Chandra Thakur		
1978	Phaansi			
1978	Ghar			
1979	Ahinsa			
1979	Baton Baton Mein	Francis Fernandes		
1979	Dhongee	Michael York		
1979	Do Hawaldar	Bholaram		
1979	Do Ladke Dono Kadke	Ramu		
1979	Hamare Tumhare	Gauri Shankar		
1979	Jaan-e-Bahaar			
1979	Jurmana	Nandlal Chaturvedi		
1979	Love in Canada	Bansi		
1979	Naalayak	Lallu Kumar Lalla		
1979	Bhala Manus			
1979	Salaam Memsaab	Sunder	Director	
1979	Sargam	Gopi		
1980	Vava Viramgam			
1980	Sau Dahada Sasuna To Ek Dahada Vahuno			
1980	Desh Drohi			
1980	The Burning Train	Col. P.K. Bhandari		
1980	Takkar			
1980	Swayamvar			
1980	Agreement	Dilip Kanuchand		
1980	Maang Bharo Sajana			
1980	Yeh Kaisa Insaf?			
1980	Nishana			
1980	Gunehgaar			
1980	Bandish			
1980	Hum Nahin Sudhrenge			
1981	Ek Aur Ek Gyarah			
1981	Aapas Ki Baat	Bhola		
1981	Ek Duuje Ke Liye	G. Haribabu		
1981	Vaheta Aansu Vahu Na			
1981	Aas Paas	Jaikishen		
1981	Ek Hi Bhool	Manohar Prasad M.P.		
1981	Kahani Ek Chor Ki	Kantilal		
1981	Meri Aawaz Suno	Bahadur		
1981	Zamaane Ko Dikhana Hai	Drunkard (Guest Appearance)		
1982	Khara Khari No Khel			
1982	Jugal Jodi			
1982	Hamari Abu Alka			
1982	Pathar Ki Lakeer			
1982	Dial 100			
1982	Farz Aur Kanoon			
1982	Raaj Mahal			
1982	Nikaah	Saif		
1982	Kaamchor			
1982	Sitam			
1982	Mehndi Rang Layegi			
1982	Main Intequam Loonga			
1982	Baawri			
1983	Ek Baar Chale Aao			
1983	Agar Tum Na Hote			
1983	Mawaali			
1983	Mujhe Insaaf Chahiye			
1983	Bekaraar			
1983	Shubh Kaamna			
1983	Justice Chaudhury			
1983	Jaani Dost			
1983	Prem Tapasya			
1983	Andhaa Kaanoon			
1983	Himmatwala	Bhushan		
1983	Hiro Ghoghe Jai Avyo			
1984	Kaamyab			
1984	Mera Faisla			
1984	Sharara			
1984	Yeh Ishq Nahin Aasaan	Jamal		
1984	Love Marriage			
1984	Tohfa			
1984	Jhutha Sach			
1984	Naya Kadam			
1984	Asha Jyoti			
1984	Qaidi			
1984	Maqsad			
1984	Aaj Kaa M.L.A. Ram Avtar			
1984	Ghar Ek Mandir			
1984	Sardaar	Motiheera Lalwani		
1984	Wanted: Dead or Alive			
1985	Haqeeqat			
1985	Mera Saathi			
1985	Dekha Pyar Tumhara			
1985	Sanjog			
1985	Teri Meherbaniyan	Munim Banwarilal		
1985	Sur Sangam			
1985	Wafadaar			
1985	Aakhir Kyon?			
1985	Meraa Ghir Mere Bachche			
1985	Masterji			
1985	Yaadon Ki Kasam			
1985	Pataal Bhairavi			
1985	Balidaan			
1985	Tawaif			
1985	Sarfarosh			
1985	Pyar Jhukta Nahin			
1985	Natkhad Narad		Web Series	
1985	Hoshiyar			
1985	Pyaase Honth			
1986	Saat Qaidi			
1986	Badkaar			
1986	Diwala			
1986	Love 86			
1986	Swarag Se Sunder			
1986	Dharm Adhikari			
1986	Muddat			
1986	Dosti Dushmani			
1986	Aisa Pyaar Kahan			
1986	Khel Mohabbat Ka			
1986	Suhaagan			
1986	Insaaf Ki Awaaz			
1986	Aag Aur Shola			
1987	Maa Baap			
1987	Tera Karam Mera Dhanam			
1987	Majaal			
1987	Suno Sasurdjee			
1987	Satyamev Jayate			
1987	Kudrat Ke Kanoon			
1987	Sindoor			
1987	Himmat Aur Mehanat			
1987	Sher Shivaji			
1987	Mard Ki Zabaan			
1987	Jawab Hum Denge			
1987	Aulad			
1988	Nagin Ke Do Dushman			
1988	Mulzim			
1988	Pyaar Ka Mandir			
1988	Tamacha			
1988	Shukriyaa			
1988	Ghunghat			
1988	Charnon Ki Saugandh			
1988	Waqt Ki Awaz			
1988	Biwi Ho To Aisi			
1988	Ganga Tere Desh Mein			
1988	Agnee			
1988	Sone Pa Suhaaga			
1988	Mar Mitenge			
1988	Kharidar			
1988	Dariya Dil			
1988	Commando			
1990	Baap Numbri Beta Dus Numbri			
1990	Pyar Ka Karz			
1990	Izzatdaar			
1990	Aaj Ka Arjun	Chikoo		
1990	Amadavad no Rikshavaro		Gujarati Film includes being Director	
1990	Majboor			
1990	Muqaddar Ka Badshaah	Dhamdilal		
1990	Jawani Zindabad			
1991	Pyar Ka Devta			
1991	Ghar Parivar			
1991	Karz Chukana Hai			
1991	Prem Qaidi			
1991	Pratigyabadh			
1991	Pratikar			
1991	Dharam Sankat			
1991	Sapnon Ka Mandir			
1992	Kasak			
1992	Vansh			
1992	Adharm			
1992	Inteha Pyar Ki			
1992	Jo Jeeta Wohi Sikandar	Dubeyji, Teacher		
1992	Police Officer	Police Inspector Sharma		
1992	Ed Ladka Ek Ladki			
1992	Laat Saab			
1992	Jeena Marna Tere Sang			
1992	Isi Ka Naam Zindagi			
1992	I Love You			
1993	Muqabla	Soni's husband		
1993	Geethanjali			
1993	Sangram			
1993	Badi Bahan			
1993	Phool Aur Angaar			
1993	Gurudev			
1993	Aag Ka Toofan			
1993	Gardish			
1993	Dil Tera Aashiq	Natwar Lal		
1993	Santaan			
1993	Kasam Teri Kasam			
1994	Hanste Khelte		Telefilm	
1994	Aag Aur Chingari			
1994	Bollywood			
1994	Imtehaan			
1994	Brahma			
1994	Janta Ki Adalat			
1994	Beta Ho To Aisa			
1994	Ghar Ki Izzat			
1995	Baazi			
1995	Taqdeerwala	Chitragupt		
1995	Bewafa Sanam			
1995	Anokha Andaaz	Nazakat Ali		
1995	Gundaraj			
1995	Diya Aur Toofan			
1995	Ram Shastra			
1995	Kismat			
1995	Ek Se Bhadkar Ek		Web Series	
1996	Vijeta			
1996	Shoharat			
1996	Muqadar			
1996	Daanveer			
1996	Raja Ki Aayegi Bharat			
1996	Chhota Sa Ghar			
1997	Jai Mahalaxmi Maa			
1997	Sanam			
1997	Zameer: The Awakening of a Soul			
1997	Yug		Web Series	
1997	Do Ankhen Barah Hath			
1997	Mere Sapno Ki Rani			
1997	Udaan			
1997	Kaun Rokega Mujhe			
1998	Mehndi	Tolani		
1998	Hero Hindustani	Cameroon		
1998	Haste Hasate			
1998	Bade Miyan Chote Miyan	Security Officer		
1998	Taqdeer		Web Series	
1998	Dulhe Raja	Inspector Azgar Singh		
1998	Gharwali Baharwali	Dr. Ved		
1998	Chandaal			
1998	Love Story 98			
1998	Phool Aur Faulad			
1999	Raja Kumarudu	Policeman	Telugu film	
1999	Kartos			
1999	Haseena Maan Jaayegi	Jamnadas		
1999	Naydaata			
1999	Maa Kasam			
1999	International Khiladi	Payal's Boss		
1999	Heeralal Pannalal	Havaldar Chaurasia		
1999	Mother	Johnny		
2000	Aaghaaz	Gullu		
2000	Karobaar	Champak		
2000	Shikaar			
2000	Har Dil Jo Key			
2000	Agniputra			
2000	Chal Mere Bhai	Family Doctor		
2000	Piyo Gayo Pardesh			
2000	Krishna Tere Desh Main			
2000	Tera Jadoo Chal Gayaa	Company owner		
2000	Kothewali			
2000	Hera Pheri	Bank Manager		
2000	Mela	Kaka/Banwari Baniya		
2001	Aamdani Atthani Kharcha Rupaiyaa	Jhoomri's Boss		
2001	Maut Ka Khel			
2001	Yeh Teraa Ghar Yeh Meraa Ghar	Chandiramani		
2001	Zahreela			
2001	Lajja	Gulab Chand		
2002	Dil Vil Pyar Vyar	Chandru		
2002	Ankhiyon Se Goli Maare	Topichand's brother-in-law		
2002	Chalo Ishq Ladaaye			
2002	Dil Churaya Apne			
2002	Awara Paagal Deewana	Champaklal		
2002	Ek Aur Visphot	Dr. Daniel		
2003	Mumbai Matinee	Pyarelal		
2003	Baghban	Bedi Sab (Sardar)		
2003	Tujhe Meri Kasam	Kashinath Dixit		
2004	Ek Se Badhkar Ek	Don Srikant Ramprasad		
2004	Suno Sasurjee	Murli		
2004	Thoda Tum Badlo Thoda Hum			
2004	Shart: The Challenge			
2004	Ball & Chain	Papa		
2004	Jiyo Mhara Lal			
2004	Hulchul	Advocate Mishra		
2005	Deewane Huye Paagal	Blind Man		
2005	Chalta Hai Pyar			
2005	Garam Masala	Mamu		
2005	Cages	Leo	English film	
2005	Hotel Kingston		Web Series	
2005	Elaan	Kishorilal		
2005	Chakachak			
2005	Khullam Khulla Pyaar Karen			
2005	Insaan	Film Director		
2005	Kyon Ki	Asylum patient		
2006	Bhagam Bhag	Event Manager		
2006	Malamaal Weekly	Chokhey		
2006	Hota Hai Dil Pyar Mein Paagal			
2006	Chup Chup Ke	Sharma Ji		
2007	Welcome	Producer Akhilendra Chandel		
2007	Bhool Bhulaiyaa	Murari		
2007	Shakalaka Boom Boom			
2007	Odd Iss Gold			
2007	Dhamaal	Nari Contractor		
2007	Welcome			
2007	Journey Bombay to Goa			
2007	Main Rony Aur Jony			
2007	Dhol	Pankaj's brother-in-law		
2007	Fool & Final	Lalwani		
2008	Kurukshetra		Malayalam film; cameo appearance	
2008	Mehbooba			
2008	Khalliballi: Fun Unlimited			
2008	Fauj Mein Mauj			
2008	Hwide Su Door Mat Ja			
2008	Tulsi: Mathrudevobhava			
2008	Cheenti Cheenti Bang Bang		Animated Film	
2008	Karzzz	Mr. Joe D'Souza, Principal of Verma Catering College		
2008	Jumbo	Senapati (Voice)	Animated Film	
2008	Billu	Naubat Chacha		
2008	Yaariyan	Dr. Palta	Punjabi film	
2009	Paying Guests	Kiska Miglani		
2009	Dhoondte Reh Jaoge			
2009	Chal Chala Chal			
2009	Dekh Bhai Dekh			
2009	Ruslaan			
2009	De Dana Dan	Mamu Lee Chan		
2009	All The Best	Vidya's father		
2010	Khatta Meetha	Karodimal		
2010	Mastang Mama			
2010	Dus Tola	Sarpanch		
2010	Kushti			
2011	Bodyguard	Shekhar		
2011	Be-Careful			
2012	Joker	Master ji		
2012	Life Ki Toh Lag Gayi			
2012	It's Rocking: Dard-E-Disco			
2012	Ata Pata Lapatta			
2012	Kamaal Dhamaal Malamaal	Priest		
2012	In the Name of Tai			
2012	Bol Bachchan	Shashtri		
2012	Agent Vinod	Ramlal		
2013	R.. Rajkumar	Pandit		
2013	Wake Up India			
2013	Himmatwala	Ticket Checker		
2014	Gang of Ghosts			
2014	18.11 - A Code of Secrecy	Habilder-Paholwan		
2014	3 Doba Tauba Tauba			
2014	Balwinder Singh Famous Ho Gaya			
2015	Sallu ki Shaadi			
2015	Chor Bazaari			
2015	Dillagi... Yeh Dillagi			
2015	Gour Hari Dastaan			
2015	Ishq Ka Manjan	Santa		
2016	Permanent Roommates	Mikesh's grandfather	Web Series	
2016	Circle	Boss	Bengali movie	
2016	Mastizaade	Laila & Lily's father		
2016	Murari the Mad Gentleman	Mukhia		
2017	Baap Dhamal Dikra Kamal			
2017	Ishq Ka Manjan			
2017	Partners		Web Series	
2017	Sallu Ki Shaadi			
2017	15 August Bhagile 26 January			
2018	Yamla Pagla Deewana: Phir Se	Nanu		
2019	Shaadi Ke Patasey			
2020	Sabne Bana Di Jodi			
2020	It's My Life	Father of Abhishek's friend		
2021	Bunty Aur Babli 2	Tehre Singh		
2021	Oye Mamu!			
2021	Baap No Bagicho		Gujarati film	
2021	Nyaay: The Justice			
2021	Babloo Bachelor			
2022	BubblePur - Kooku		Web Series	
2022	Bloody Brothers	Samuel Alvarez	Web Series	
2022	3 Shyanne			
2022	Khalli Balli			
2022	King Sweety			
2023	Ek Tha Hero			
2023	Dream Girl 2	Yusuf Ali Salim Khan	Final film releases during lifetime	
2023	Non Stop Dhamaal	Jassu Bhai	Final film releases during lifetime	
2024	Kunwarapur			
2025	Deda			
2025	Kis Kisko Pyaar Karoon 2	Father Anthony	Posthumous release	
2025	Fear		Posthumous release	
2025	Super Dhamaal.com		Posthumous release	
2026	Ikkis	Mr Asghar	Posthumous release	
2026	Bhooth Bangla	Shantaram Yadav / Shambhu Babu	Posthumous release	
2026	Haiwaan	Hussain	Posthumous release	

=== As director ===
Year	Title	Language	Notes
1977	Chala Murari Hero Banne	Hindi	
1979	Salaam Memsaab	Hindi	
1980	Hum Nahin Sudhrenge	Hindi	
1990	Amadavad no Rikshavaro	Gujarati	
1992	Dil Hi To Hai	Hindi	
1997	Udaan	Hindi	

== Songs ==
Year	Film	Song	Notes
1977	Alaap	"Binati Sun Le Tanik"	
1977	Alaap	"Ho Rama Dar Lage Apni Umariya Se"	
1978	Phool Khile Hain Gulshan Gulshan	"Mannu Bhai Motor Chali Pum Pum"	with Kishore Kumar

== Awards and nominations ==
Filmfare Awards				
Year	Film	Category	Result	Notes
1974	Abhimaan	Best Supporting Actor	Nominated	
1974	Aaj Ki Taaza Khabar	Best Performance in a Comic Role	Won	
1974	Namak Haraam	Best Performance in a Comic Role	Nominated	
1975	Chor Machaye Shor	Best Performance in a Comic Role	Nominated	
1975	Bidaai	Best Performance in a Comic Role	Nominated	
1976	Rafoo Chakkar	Best Performance in a Comic Role	Nominated	
1976	Sholay	Best Performance in a Comic Role	Nominated	
1977	Chhoti Si Baat	Best Performance in a Comic Role	Nominated	
1977	Balika Badhu	Best Performance in a Comic Role	Won	
1979	Pati Patni Aur Woh	Best Performance in a Comic Role	Nominated	
1980	Sargam	Best Performance in a Comic Role	Nominated	
1981	Hum Nahi Sudherenge	Best Performance in a Comic Role	Nominated	
1982	Ek Duuje Ke Liye	Best Performance in a Comic Role	Nominated	
