= Manju Asrani =

Indian actress

- Born: Manju Asrani
- Occupations: Actress; Director
- Years active: 1973 - 1995
- Spouse: Govardhan Asrani

Manju Asrani (née Bansal) is a Hindi film actress, who was mostly active during the 1970s and 80s. She was married to the actor Govardhan Asrani, himself popularly known simply as Asrani. While working on the sets of Aaj Ki Taaza Khabar and Namak Haraam, the couple fell in love.

In the 1990s Manju also directed films and series.

== Filmography ==
=== Actor ===
| Year | Title | Role | Notes |
|---|---|---|---|
| 1979 | Chor Sipahee | Manju | |
| 1979 | Nalayak | Leelu | |
| 1979 | Jurmana | | |
| 1979 | Sarkari Mehmaan | Rekha | |
| 1979 | Jaan-E-Bahaar | Mona | |
| 1977 | Chandi Sona | Mandha | |
| 1976 | Kabeela | Sawli | |
| 1976 | Udhar Ka Sindur | Julie Verma | |
| 1976 | Deewaangee | Ruby | |
| 1976 | Tapasya | | |
| 1973 | Namak Haraam | Rama, Pandey's assistant | |
| 1973 | Aaj Ki Taaza Khabar | Kesari Desai | |

=== Director ===
| Year | Title | Notes |
|---|---|---|
| 1995 | Maa Ki Mamta | Director (as Manju Bansal Asrani) |
