= Sazaa =

Sazaa may refer to:

- Sazaa (1951 film), an Indian Hindi-language film
- Sazaa (1972 film), an Indian Hindi-language thriller film
- Sazaa (2011 film), a Maldivian romantic drama film
