= Kalpataru (director) =

Indian film director

- Born: 1937
- Died: 17 May 2015 (aged 77–78); Mumbai, Maharastra, India
- Occupation: Director

Kalpataru (born in 1937 as K Parvez) was an Indian film director best known for several hit movies such as Ghar Dwaar, Khoon Ka Badla Khoon, Ghar Ghar Ki Kahani and Bade Ghar Ki Beti.He was known for his melodramatic family dramas.

He died at a hospital in Santacruz West on 17 May 2015 at the age of 78. He is survived by his wife and two daughters.

== Filmography ==
- 1998 Phool Aur Faulad
- 1996 Chhota Sa Ghar
- 1994 Ghar Ki Izzat
- 1993 Ghar Ki Laaj
- 1993 Badi Bahen
- 1992 Naseebwaala
- 1992 Rishta To Ho Aisa
- 1992 Humshakal (as Kalptaru)
- 1990 Ghar Ho To Aisa
- 1989 Apna Ghar
- 1989 Paraya Ghar
- 1989 Bade Ghar Ki Beti (as Kalptaru)
- 1988 Ghar Ghar Ki Kahani
- 1987 Ghar Ka Sukh
- 1986 Maa Beti
- 1985 Ghar Dwaar
- 1983 Hamar Bhauji
- 1980 Parabesh
- 1980 Paribesh
- 1978 Khoon Ka Badla Khoon (as K. Parvez)
- 1977 Tinku (as K. Parvez)
- 1973 Dhamkee (as K. Parvez)
- 1972 Do Bachche Dus Haath (as K. Parvez)
- 1967 Chhaila Babu (as K. Parvez)
- 1967 Duniya Nachegi (as K. Parvez)
- 1963 Dekha Pyaar Tumhara (as K. Parvez)
- 1963 Kahin Pyaar Na Ho Jaaye (as K. Parvez)
- 1961 Salaam Memsaab (as K. Parvez)
- 1958 Mr. Q (as K. Parvez)
