= Do Dilon Ki Dastaan (1985 film) =

- Poster
- Directed by: A. C. Tirulokchandar
- Written by: Javed Siddiqui (dialogues)
- Screenplay by: Ravi Kapoor; Mohan Kaul
- Produced by: M. M. Malhotra; Baldev Pushkarna
- Starring: Sanjay Dutt; Padmini Kolhapure; Kajal Kiran; Shakti Kapoor; Om Prakash
- Cinematography: M. Vishwanath Rai
- Edited by: Prabhakar Supare
- Music by: Laxmikant–Pyarelal
- Release date: 15 February 1985
- Country: India
- Language: Hindi

Do Dilon Ki Dastaan (transl. The Story of Two Hearts) is a 1985 Indian Bollywood romance film directed by A. C. Tirulokchandar. It stars Sanjay Dutt and Padmini Kolhapure in pivotal roles.

== Cast ==
The cast has been listed below:

- Sanjay Dutt as Vijay Kumar Saxena
- Padmini Kolhapure as Sona Mathur
- Kajal Kiran as Aarti Verma
- Shakti Kapoor as Shekhar
- Om Prakash as Mr. Saxena
- Asit Sen as Munim
- Shubha Khote as Jooni
- Arun Govil as Kamal

== Soundtrack ==
Lyrics: Anjaan

Song	Singer
"Humrahi Mere Humrahi, Ke Mere Sang Tu, To Dar Kya"	Lata Mangeshkar, Suresh Wadkar
"Main Main Na Raha, Tu Tu Na Rahi, Lo Shuru Ho Gayi"	Shabbir Kumar, Asha Bhosle
"Aap Ko Aap Se Chura Loon"	Asha Bhosle
"Ek Sabzpari"	Amit Kumar
"Gulabi Gore Gaal, Adayen Bemisal, Khuda Ka Hai Kamaal, Tauba Meri Tauba"	Suresh Wadkar, Anwar
