= Ball & Chain =

- Directed by: Shiraz Jafri
- Written by: Thomas Mortimer
- Produced by: A. V. T. Shankardass
- Starring: Sunil Malhotra; Lisa Ray; Kal Penn; Pura Bedi; Asrani
- Cinematography: Peter Simonite
- Edited by: Luis Caffesse; Cliff Wildman
- Music by: Deane Ogden
- Distributed by: Lions Gate Entertainment
- Release date: 2004
- Running time: 90 minutes
- Country: United States
- Language: English
- Budget: $3.2 million USD

Ball & Chain is a 2004 romantic comedy written by Thomas Mortimer. It was directed by Shiraz Jafri and produced by A. V. T. Shankardass. It stars Sunil Malhotra, Lisa Ray, Kal Penn, Purva Bedi and Asrani. It was filmed on location in Austin, Texas. It was released by Lions Gate Entertainment.

== Plot ==
Somewhere in the middle of Texas, Ameet (Sunil Malhotra) and Saima (Lisa Ray) have a problem. They were perfectly happy avoiding each other until their parents set them up to get married. The reluctant couple decide to do whatever it takes to break off the engagement. After some very embarrassing efforts, they finally succeed in getting their parents to call off the wedding, only to realize they have another problem, they're in love! Meanwhile, Saima's father (Asrani), deciding that she's passed her expiration date, promises her to Ashol (Ismail Bashey)- a sleazy playboy. Finally, there's a wedding; Ashol's big secret, Ameet's bigger surprise, and Saima's biggest decision.

== Cast ==
- Sunil Malhotra as Ameet
- Lisa Ray as Saima
- Asrani as Papa
- Kal Penn as Bobby
- Purva Bedi as Ruby
- Ismail Bashey as Ashol
- Johnny Kastl as Monty
- Ather Ali as Dev
- Brea Cola as Angela
- Subash Kundanmal as Ameet's Father
- Noor Shic as Ameet's Mother
- Ulka Amin as Saima'a Mom
- Shaan Puri as Deepy
