= Ganga Tera Pani Amrit =

- Poster
- Starring: Navin Nischol; Yogeeta Bali; Rehman; Pran; Nirupa Roy; Ashok Kumar
- Music by: Ravi
- Release date: 1971
- Country: India
- Language: Hindi

Ganga Tera Pani Amrit (Ganga, Your Water Is Ambrosial) is a 1971 Bollywood drama film. The film stars Navin Nischol, Yogeeta Bali, Rehman, Pran, Nirupa Roy, Ashok Kumar and Shatrughan Sinha.

== Cast ==
- Navin Nischol as Dinesh
- Yogeeta Bali as Manju
- Rehman as Devkinandan (Dinesh's Father)
- Pran as Birju / Brijmohan
- Nirupa Roy as Shobha
- Ashok Kumar as Manju's Father
- Achala Sachdev as Manju's Mother
- Shatrughan Sinha as Lal Singh
- Narendra Nath as Chander
- Nana Palsikar as Masterji
- Jagdeep as Barber
- Ramesh Deo as Mahendra

== Soundtrack ==
Song	Singer
"Ganga Tera Pani Amrit" – 1	Mohammed Rafi
"Ganga Tera Pani Amrit" – 2	Mohammed Rafi
"Ganga Tera Pani Amrit" – 3	Mohammed Rafi
"Is Dharti, Is Khule Gagan Ka Kya Kehna"	Mohammed Rafi, Asha Bhosle
"O Ladke Makhan Se"	Asha Bhosle
"Hamen Yaari Se Garaz Yaar Jo Bhi Kare"	Manna Dey, Mahendra Kapoor
