= Padmini Kolhapure =

Indian actress (born 1955)

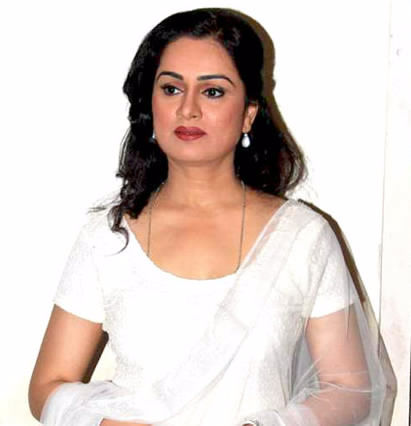
- Kolhapure in 2017
- Born: 1 November 1965 (age 61); Mumbai, Maharashtra, India
- Occupations: Actress; singer
- Spouse: Pradeep Sharma (m. 1986)
- Children: 1
- Relatives: See Mangeshkar-Hardikar-Abhisheki-Kolhapure family Shraddha Kapoor (Niece)

Padmini Kolhapure (born 1 November 1965) is an Indian actress and singer, who primarily works in Hindi and Marathi films. Kolhapure is considered as one of the leading actress of the 80s. In a career spanning over four decades, she has worked in over 75 films and has received several accolades including three Filmfare Awards.

She began her acting career in 1972 at the age of seven, and her early works include Zindagi (1976) and Dream Girl (1977). She had her breakthrough with the film Satyam Shivam Sundaram (1978), starring as the young Roopa.

At the age of 15, Kolhapure won the Filmfare Award for Best Supporting Actress for her performance in the revenge drama Insaf Ka Tarazu (1980), and at the age of 17, won the Filmfare Award for Best Actress for the musical romantic drama Prem Rog (1982), thus becoming the second-youngest actress to win the awards in the respective categories. She was also nominated for the Best Supporting Actress for her role in Souten (1983) and also received a Best Actress nomination for Pyar Jhukta Nahin (1985). Kolhapure established herself as a leading lady in Hindi cinema with films such as - Ahista Ahista (1981), Vidhaata (1982), Woh Saat Din (1983), Do Dilon Ki Dastaan (1985), Swarag Se Sunder (1986), Dadagiri (1987), Phata Poster Nikla Hero (2013) and Panipat (2019). She has also acted in Marathi films like Chimani Pakhar (2000), Manthan: Ek Amrut Pyala (2005) and Prawaas (2020).

== Early life and family ==
Padmini Kolhapure was born 1 November 1965 in a Marathi family, second among the three daughters of Pandharinath Kolhapure, a professional musician, by his wife Nirupama Kolhapure. Her elder sister is the former actress Shivangi Kolhapure, wife of actor Shakti Kapoor and mother of actress Shraddha Kapoor and actor Siddhanth Kapoor. Her younger sister, Tejaswini Kolhapure, too is an actress.

The family took the surname "Kolhapure" because they hailed from Kolhapur in Maharashtra. Padmini's mother, Nirupama Kolhapure, was a Saraswat Brahmin. Padmini's father, Pandharinath Kolhapure, was a talented vocalist and Veena player. He was the son of Pandit Krishnarao Kolhapure (partner in Balvant Natak Academy along with Pandit Deenanath Mangeshkar), an exponent of Natya Sangeet, who had enjoyed the patronage of the Baroda Durbar. Pandharinath's mother was the half-sister of Pandit Deenanath Mangeshkar, and sister of Balwantrao Abhisheki, the father of vocalist Jitendra Abhisheki. Thus, Padmini is niece of legendary singers Lata Mangeshkar and Asha Bhonsle. Her mother formerly used to work as ground staff with Air India.

== Career ==
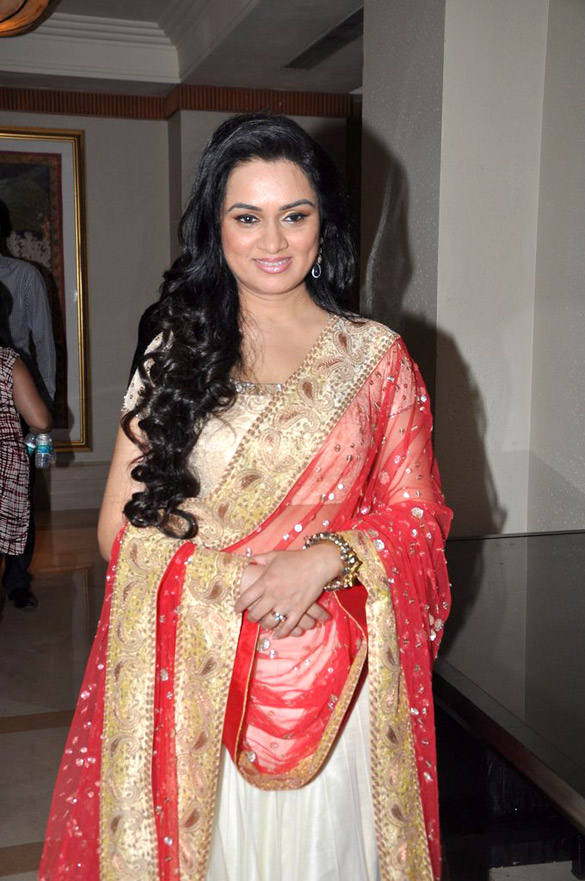
Kolhapure in 2012

As a child, she sang in the chorus for songs in films such as Yaadon Ki Baaraat, Kitaab and Dushman Dost with her sister Shivangi. Padmini later sang for her own films such as Vidhaata, Daana Pani, Professor Ki Padosan Hum Intezaar Karenge and Sadak Chhap (with Kishore Kumar). She released an album with Bappi Lahiri titled Music Lovers. She performed for the Greater London Council at the Royal Albert Hall in London with Bappi Lahiri and his troupe in 1986. Asha Bhosle suggested Padmini's name to Dev Anand, who then cast her in Ishk Ishk Ishk (1975). This led to other films, such as Dreamgirl (1977), Zindagi (1976), and Saajan Bina Suhagan (1978). She also gave a very commendable performance of a school girl inflicted by black magic in Gehrayee (1980).

Kolhapure's mother quit her airlines job to be a full-time chaperone as Padmini picked up more roles. Her most famous child role was playing a child in Raj Kapoor's 1977 film Satyam Shivam Sundaram. Her success led to her most controversial role in Insaaf Ka Tarazu (1980), a remake of Lipstick (1976), where she played the rape victim that was originally played by Mariel Hemingway. She earned the Filmfare Award for Best Supporting Actress for her performance in the film. She graduated to heroine roles at the age of 15 in Nasir Hussain's Zamane Ko Dikhana Hai opposite Rishi Kapoor. The film flopped, but she reunited with Rishi for his father Raj Kapoor's blockbuster musical romantic drama Prem Rog (1982), which earned her the Filmfare Award for Best Actress. She also earned a Filmfare Special Performance Award for Ahista Ahista (1981).

Kolhapure was known for her professionalism and diligence. She even worked when she had fever on Do Dilon Ki Dastaan (1985). She had more box office hits, such as Vidhaata (1982) with Shammi Kapoor and Souten (1983) opposite Rajesh Khanna. She had a huge hit with Pyar Jhukta Nahin (1985) with Mithun Chakraborty, and they were paired together in several more films. For the film she received Filmfare Best Actress nomination. She agreed to work with Anil Kapoor when he was a newcomer in his first film Woh Saat Din (1983). The movie was a hit and helped cement his name in the Indian film industry; Anil Kapoor attributes his eventual success in the film industry to her "luck".

Kolhapure's other notable films through the 80s include - Yeh Ishq Nahin Aasaan (1984), Swarag Se Sunder (1986), Suhaagan (1986) and Dadagiri (1987). Kolhapure limited her work through the 90s. Her notable films include Professor Ki Padosan (1994) and Rockford, where she was the producer. In 2000, she won Screen Award for Best Actress - Marathi for the film Chimani Pakhar.

She returned to acting in 2004 and worked in many Marathi and Hindi films. Manthan: Ek Amrut Pyala (2005) and Eight Shani (2006) were among them. She appeared in Mera Bachpan with Helen in 2008. She has also acted on stage in Kaash, followed by Abhi To Mein Jawan Hoon and Aasman Se Gire Khajoor Pe Atke, with her brother-in-law Shakti Kapoor. Post 2010, Kolhapure played supporting roles mainly that of a mother. In 2011, she foray into Malayalam cinema with V. K. Prakash's Karmayogi, an adaptation of Shakespeare's Hamlet. In 2013, she played Shahid Kapoor's mother in the comedy film Phata Poster Nikla Hero (2013), and then played Gopikabai in Panipat (2019). Sje received praises for her 2020 Marathi film Prawaas.

Kolhapure made her television debut with Ekk Nayi Pehchaan playing Pallavi Suresh Modi. In 2021, she appeared in the web series Dil Bekaraar. Along with this, she has appeared as guest on various reality shows.

== Personal life ==
While working for the film Aisa Pyaar Kahan (1986), Kolhapure met Pradeep Sharma alias Tutu Sharma, who was the producer of the film. They were married after a brief courtship in 1986. They have a son named Priyaank Sharma, born in February 1990. Priyank had assisted filmmaker Rajkumar Santoshi for the film Phata Poster Nikla Hero and has worked as an actor in Sab Kushal Mangal (2020). He married producer Karim Morani's daughter and Zoa Morani's sister Shaza Morani on 4 February 2021.

== Media image and legacy ==
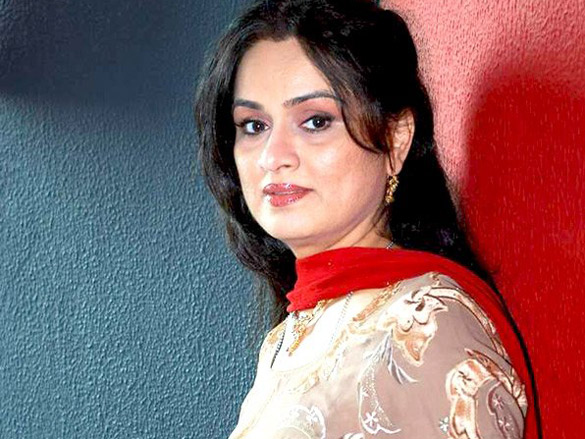
Kolhapure in 2010

Kolhapure is regarded as one of the most popular and leading actress of 1980s. In 2022, she was placed in Outlook India's "75 Best Bollywood Actresses" list. Her co-actor Anil Kapoor credited his career to her and said, "It’s because she agreed to do Woh 7 Din that, I am where I am today." The Tribune noted, "Padmini Kolhapure is charming, beautiful and graceful. The innocence on her face will take you back to the 80s when she ruled millions of hearts."

In 1981, Kolhapure had given King Charles III, a peck on the cheek. This created a great deal of buzz in the British media. In 2016, Kolhapure turned a designer and started her Indian and Indo-western wear brand, with her friend Sita Talwalkar. Her niece Shraddha Kapoor, unveiled the label.

== Filmography ==
=== Films ===
Year	Title	Role	Notes	Ref.
1974	Ek Khiladi Bawan Patte		Child artist	
1975	Ishk Ishk Ishk		Child artist	
1976	Zindagi	Guddu	Child artist	
1977	Dream Girl	Padmini	Child artist	
1978	Saajan Bina Suhagan	Bulbul Chopra	Child artist	
1978	Satyam Shivam Sundaram	Young Rupa	Child artist	
1978	Hamara Sansar	Asha	Child artist	
1980	Thodisi Bewafaii	Meenu	Young adult	
1980	Gehrayee	Uma	Young adult	
1980	Insaaf Ka Tarazu	Neeta	Young adult Won - Filmfare Award for Best Supporting Actress	
1981	Ahista Ahista	Chandra	Debut as heroine Won - Filmfare Special Performance Award	
1981	Zamaane Ko Dikhana Hai	Kanchan		
1982	Prem Rog	Manorama	Won - Filmfare Award for Best Actress	
1982	Vidhaata	Durga		
1982	Star	Dev's Fan	Cameo	
1982	Teri Maang Sitaron Se Bhar Doon			
1982	Swami Dada	Chamkili		
1983	Lovers	Mary		
1983	Mazdoor	Meena Saxena		
1983	Souten	Radha	Nominated - Filmfare Award for Best Supporting Actress	
1983	Woh Saat Din	Maya		
1983	Bekaraar	Sundari		
1984	Yeh Ishq Nahin Aasaan	Salma Mirza		
1984	Naya Kadam	Chanda		
1984	Ek Nai Paheli	Kajri		
1984	Sheeshay Ka Ghar			
1984	Hum Hain Lajawab	Dilruba		
1985	Pyaar Jhukta Nahin	Preeti	Nominated - Filmfare Award for Best Actress	
1985	Aaj Ka Daur	Durga Agnihotri		
1985	Rahi Badal Gaye	Sangeeta		
1985	Pyari Behna	Mangla		
1985	Insaaf Main Karoonga	Pinky		
1985	Bewafai	Renu		
1985	Patthar Dil	Bindiya		
1985	Wafadaar	Sita		
1985	Do Dilon Ki Dastaan	Sona Mathur		
1986	Anubhav	Gauri		
1986	Swarag Se Sunder	Lalita Choudhury		
1986	Aisa Pyaar Kahan	Pooja		
1986	Muddat	Kalpana		
1986	Kirayadar	Jaya Abhyankar		
1986	Pyar Kiya Hai Pyar Karenge	Usha		
1986	Preeti	Preeti		
1986	Suhaagan	Jyoti		
1986	Jumbish - The Movement:The Film	Vidya/Dharti		
1987	Jhanjhaar	Pushpa		
1987	Pyar Ke Kabil	Sangeeta Kapoor		
1987	Dadagiri	Barkha Singh		
1987	Sadak Chhap	Anju		
1987	Hawalaat	Geeta		
1988	Sagar Sangam	Radha		
1989	Hum Intezaar Karenge	Manisha		
1989	Dana Paani	Chanda		
1989	Daata	Sona		
1991	Qurbani Rang Layegi	Basanti	Delayed release	
1992	Touhean	Sandhya	Delayed release	
1994	Professor Ki Padosan	Menaka Khanna	Delayed release	
1999	Rockford	_	Producer	
2000	Chimani Pakhar	Nandini	Marathi film; Won - Screen Award for Best Actress Marathi	
2005	Manthan: Ek Amrut Pyala	Anjali Deshpande	Marathi film	
2006	Souten: The Other Woman	Smita S. Singh		
2006	Eight: The Power of Shani	Radha S. Rai		
2009	Bolo Raam	Archana Kaushik		
2012	Karmayogi	Mankamma	Malayalam film	
2012	Mai	Madhu		
2013	Phata Poster Nikla Hero	Savitri Rao		
2013	Daughter			
2013	Dhuaan			
2015	Karbonn	Gayatri		
2015	Bachpan Ek Dhokha			
2019	Panipat	Gopika Bai		
2020	Prawaas	Lata Inamdar	Marathi Film	
2026	Jhaad Phoonk			

=== Television ===
Year	Title	Role	Notes	Ref.
2014	Ekk Nayi Pehchaan	Pallavi Suresh Modi		
2021	Super Dancer	Herself	Guest	
2021	Dil Bekaraar	Bhudevi	Web series	
2022	Sa Re Ga Ma Pa Li'l Champs 2022	Herself	Guest	
2023	India's Best Dancer 3	Herself	Guest	
2025	Chakravarti Samrat Prithviraj Chauhan	Rajmata		

=== Music video appearances ===
Year	Title	Singer(s)	Ref.
2021	"Hum Hindustani"	Various	
2021	"Yeh Galiyan Yeh Chaubara"	Herself	

== Discography ==
=== Film songs ===
Year	Film	Song	Composer	Ref.
1973	Yaadon Ki Baaraat	"Yaadon Ki Baaraat Nikli Hai Aaj Dil Ke Dwaare"	R. D. Burman	
1980	The Burning Train	"Teri Hai Zameen Tera Aasman""	R. D. Burman	
1981	Zamane Ko Dikhana Hai	"Poochho Na Yaar Kya Hua"	R. D. Burman	
1982	Vidhaata	"Saat Saheliyan Khadi Khadi Fariyad Sunayen Ghadi Ghadi"	Kalyanji-Anandji	
1987	Sadak Chhap	"Pehli Pehli Baar Aankhen Jab Ho Chaar"	Bappi Lahiri	
1989	Hum Intezaar Karenge	"Pehle Milan Ki Raat Aayi, Kitne Dinon Ke Baad Aayi"	Bappi Lahiri	
1989	Daana Paani	"Dhokha Dhokha"	Anu Malik	
1989	Daana Paani	"Chik Chik Mirchi"	Anu Malik	
1993	Professor Ki Padosan	"Modern Girl Pehn Ke Chote Diamond"	R. D. Burman	

=== Non-film songs ===
Year	Album	Song	Composer	Co-singer(s)	Ref.
1996	REMIX: Tere Mere Beechmein	"Jhootha Nahin"	Zubeen Garg		
2000	Syndrome of Love	"Yeh Leherein Ye Paani"	Saba	Zubeen Garg	

== Awards and nominations ==
Year	Award	Category	Work	Result	Ref.
1981	Filmfare Awards	Best Supporting Actress	Insaaf Ka Tarazu	Won	
1982	Filmfare Awards	Special Performance Award	Ahista Ahista	Won	
1983	Filmfare Awards	Best Actress	Prem Rog	Won	
1984	Filmfare Awards	Best Supporting Actress	Souten	Nominated	
1986	Filmfare Awards	Best Actress	Pyar Jhukta Nahin	Nominated	
2001	Screen Awards	Best Actress – Marathi	Chimanee Pakhre	Won	
