= Chhaila Babu =

- Directed by: Kalpataru
- Starring: Master Bhagwan; Salim Khan; Kumari Naaz; Rajendra Nath; Tun Tun
- Music by: Laxmikant Pyarelal
- Production company: R. H. Mullan Production
- Release date: 1967
- Country: India
- Language: Hindi

Chhaila Babu (English language: Cool Guy) is a 1967 Bollywood comedy drama film directed by Kalpataru. The film was released under the banner of R. H. Mullan Productions.

== Cast ==
- Bhagwan Dada
- Salim Khan
- Kumari Naaz
- Rajendra Nath
- Tun Tun
- Leela Mishra
- Zeb Rehman
- Ranjana Kadam

== Soundtrack ==
1. "Tum Sanwarte Ho To" - Chitalkar Ramchandra, Asha Bhosle
2. "Rahee Hu Albela Mai Dil Kaa Nahee Maila" - Mukesh
3. "Kyon Jhukee Jhukee Hain Palke" - Mukesh, Lata Mangeshkar
4. "Tere Pyar Ne Mujhe Ghum Diya" - Mohammed Rafi
