= Jaan-e-Bahaar =

Jaan-E-Bahaar
- Directed by: Prakash Kapoor
- Music by: Bappi Lahiri
- Release date: 1979
- Country: India
- Language: Hindi

Jaan-E-Bahaar is a 1979 Bollywood film directed by Prakash Kapoor.

== Cast ==
- G. Asrani
- Manju Asrani as Mona
- Bhagwan
- Jagdeep as Mithailal (Rai's Manager)
- Kanhaiyalal
- Pinchoo Kapoor as Mr. Rai
- Padma Khanna as Dancer / Singer
- Viju Khote
- Mehmood Jr. as himself
- Indrani Mukherjee as Mrs. Rai
- Paintal as Champion Hawawala
- Lalita Pawar as Gopal's mom
- Madan Puri as Ajit's maternal uncle
- Sachin as Gopal "Gopi"
- Sarika as Kuku Rai

== Songs ==
1. "Hey Aankhe Churaao Na Dhaman Bachao Na" – Bappi Lahiri, Lata Mangeshkar
2. "O Go Piya Mera Jiya Laage Na" – Sulakshana Pandit
3. "Dil Mila Le O Abdulla" – Anuradha Paudwal, Chandrani Mukherjee
4. "Main Hoon Rahi Mastana" – Kishore Kumar
5. "Maar Gayo Re Rasgulla Khilai Ke Maar Gayo Re" – Mohammed Rafi, Anand Kumar C, Runa Laila (Bangladesh)
