= Ushmey Chakraborty =

Indian screenwriter & filmmaker

- Born: 27 October 1988 (age 37); Mumbai, Maharashtra, India
- Education: New York Film Academy
- Occupations: Screenwriter; director; actor; producer
- Years active: 2008–present
- Parents: Mithun Chakraborty (father); Yogeeta Bali (mother)
- Relatives: See Chakraborty family

Ushmey Chakraborty is an Indian filmmaker, actor, and screenwriter. He is the son of actors Mithun Chakraborty and Yogeeta Bali.

== Early life ==
Ushmey was born to Mithun Chakraborty and Yogeeta Bali in Mumbai as the second son. He has two brothers, Mimoh and Namashi Chakraborty and a sister Dishani Chakraborty.

He also attended the New York Film Academy.

== Career ==
He started his career as an actor in the film Phir Kabhi (2008), playing younger version of Mithun Chakraborty’s character.

He then made his directorial debut with film titled Life, Somewhere in 2010, which he also written and produced. The film won the Royal Reel Award from the Canada International Film Festival in 2011.

In 2013, his another directorial Lucky Man was released. The film also starred Amruta Subhash in key role.

He then made a short film in 2017 titled Holy Smoke!, it starred his siblings, Mimoh, Namashi and Dishani in pivotal roles. The film was streamed on Vimeo.

In 2022, his another short film Gay, Asian, Immigrant. It was screened at Dances With Films, an annual independent film festival located in Los Angeles, California. This film was also the official selection at the 40th Outfest Los Angeles LGBTQ Film Festival.

== Filmography ==
Year	Title	Credited as				Note(s)
Year	Title	Director	Writer	Producer	Actor	Note(s)
2008	Phir Kabhi	No	No	No	Yes	Acting debut
2010	Life Somewhere	Yes	Yes	Yes	Yes	Also editor and cinematographer
2013	Lucky Man	Yes	Yes	Yes	No	Also editor
2017	Holy Smoke!	Yes	Yes	Yes	No	Short film; Also editor and cinematographer
2022	Gay, Asian, Immigrant	Yes	Yes	Yes	Yes	Short film

=== As assistant director ===
- Enemmy (2013)
- Ishqedarriyaan (2015)

== Awards ==
- In 2011, Ushmey won the Royal Reel Award by the Canada International Film Festival for his film Life Somewhere.
