= Phir Kabhi =

- DVD cover
- Directed by: V. K. Prakash
- Written by: M. Sindhuraj; Kamlesh Kunti Singh
- Produced by: Pradeep Guha; Ronnie Screwvala
- Starring: Mithun Chakraborty; Dimple Kapadia; Rati Agnihotri
- Cinematography: Natty Subramaniam
- Music by: Shantanu Moitra
- Production companies: UTV Motion Pictures; Culture Company Pvt.Ltd.
- Distributed by: UTV Motion Pictures
- Release date: 22 September 2009
- Running time: 145 minutes
- Country: India
- Language: Hindi

Phir Kabhi (lit. 'Some Other Time') is a 2009 Indian Hindi-language romance film directed by V. K. Prakash and produced by Ronnie Screwvala and Pradeep Guha under their banners UTV Motion Pictures and Culture Company Pvt.Ltd. The film stars Mithun Chakraborty, Dimple Kapadia and Rati Agnihotri. The film was released direct-to-video and on DTH services on 22 September 2009.

== Synopsis ==
Hari Singh has been married to Lakshmi for about 40–50 years, and his son is employed in America. His son's wife Divya and daughter Sonia live with them in a very harmonious relationship. Tragedy strikes as Lakshmi suddenly passes away, leaving Hari vulnerable and, of course, alone. Now he gets close to his granddaughter and starts visiting his schoolmates. Divya concludes that Hari may not be a good influence over her daughter after she finds out that he has not only fallen in love but is also visiting on the sly as well as exchanging love letters with a woman named Ganga.

== Cast ==
- Mithun Chakraborty as Hari Singh
  - Ushmey Chakraborty as Young Hari Singh
- Dimple Kapadia as Ganga
- Rati Agnihotri as Lakshmi
- Gulshan Grover
- Kitu Gidwani
- Tinu Anand
- Nishikant Dixit
- Kaivalya Chheda as King
- Gaurav Bajaj

== Release ==
Phir Kabhi was released by Moser Baer Home Video on DVD and VCD. The film was also released simultaneously on Pay-Per-View across all Direct-broadcast satellite platforms.

== Soundtrack ==
All tracks were composed by Shantanu Moitra. Lyrics were written by Ajay Jhingran, Ashok Mishra and Swanand Kirkire.

song title	singer
"Bhai Re"	Ajay Jhingran, Shreya Ghoshal
"Dekho Ji Dekho"	Dibyendu Mukherjee, Sunidhi Chauhan
"Dildara"	Sonu Nigam, Sunidhi Chauhan
"Jheeni Jheeni"	Hamsika Iyer, Bhupinder Singh
"Phir Kabhi Gungun"	Shantanu Moitra, Shaan
