= Memsaab (film) =

- Directed by: Atma Ram
- Starring: Vinod Khanna, Yogeeta Bali
- Release date: 1971
- Country: India
- Language: Hindi

Memsaab (Note: A respectable name for an influential or a very wealthy woman.) is a 1971 Bollywood drama film directed by Atma Ram. The film stars Vinod Khanna and Yogeeta Bali.

== Cast ==
- Vinod Khanna as Arjun Dev
- Yogeeta Bali as Kiran
- Johnny Walker as Ramkhilavan
- Bindu as Pyaari
- Jayshree T. as Jaya
- G. Asrani as Sukhdev
- Abhi Bhattacharya as Nandu
- Tarun Bose as Inspector Dixit
- Rajan Haksar as Roopa Seth
- Hercules as Tiger
- Naval Kumar as Sunder
- Mac Mohan as Victor
- Aashoo Mrdula as Sonia
- Rajan as Goon
- Jagdish Raj as His Highness of Payalpur
- Shakoor as Goon

== Music ==
This film had music composed by the duo Sonik Omi and the songs were penned by the lyricist Verma Malik.

1. "Suno Suno Ek Baat Kahu" – Mohammed Rafi, Lata Mangeshkar
2. "Mujhe Dhund Le Aa Kar Saiya" – Lata Mangeshkar
3. "Jab Se Tere Mere Man Me" – Lata Mangeshkar, Minoo Purushottam
4. "Hai Re Mohe Laage" – Asha Bhosle
5. "Kismat Se Jaal Me" – Manna Dey
