= Udhar Ka Sindur =

- Poster
- Directed by: Chander Vohra
- Written by: Anand Kumar (dialogues)
- Screenplay by: L. V. Prasad
- Story by: Atluri Pundarikakshaiah
- Based on: Manushulo Devudu by: B. V. Prasad; A. Pundarikakshaiah
- Produced by: L. V. Prasad
- Starring: Jeetendra; Reena Roy; Asha Parekh
- Cinematography: Dwarka Divecha
- Edited by: Shivaji Awdhoot
- Music by: Rajesh Roshan
- Production company: Prasad Productions Pvt Ltd
- Release date: 15 October 1976
- Running time: 141 minutes
- Country: India
- Language: Hindi

Udhar Ka Sindur (transl. Vermilion of Debt) is a 1976 Indian Hindi-language drama film, produced by L. V. Prasad under the Prasad Productions Pvt. Ltd. banner, directed by Chander Vohra. The film stars Jeetendra, Reena Roy and Asha Parekh, with music composed by Rajesh Roshan. It film is a remake of the Telugu film Manushullo Devudu (1974). Parekh received a Filmfare nomination for Best Supporting Actress, the only nomination for the film.

== Cast ==
- Jeetendra as Rajkumar / Raja
- Reena Roy as Rekha
- Asha Parekh as Shantha
- Asrani as Buta Singh
- Om Shivpuri as Dr. Shivnath
- Satyendra Kapoor as Bishambernath
- Paintal as Sunder Prasad
- Vikas Anand Inspector Chauhan
- Kamal Kapoor as Superintendent of Police
- Manmohan Krishna as Durga Prasad
- Dheeraj Kumar as Premnath
- Dhumal
- Urmila Bhatt as Janki
- Prema Narayan as Munni / Sita
- Jayshree T.
- Rita Bhaduri as Sudha
- Manju Asrani as Julie Verma
- Ashalata Wabgaonkar
- Shobha Desai

== Soundtrack ==
#	Title	Singer(s)
1	"Pari Re Tu Kahan Ki Pari"	Mukesh, Asha Bhosle
2	"O Dil Jaani Bol Meri Raani"	Kishore Kumar, Anuradha Paudwal
3	"Buddha Pyar Mangda"	Lata Mangeshkar
4	"Lijiye Woh Aa Gaye"	Asha Bhosle
5	"Maa Ab Toh Main Bhi"	Lata Mangeshkar
6	"Maa Kabhi Main Bhi Piya Ghar"	Lata Mangeshkar
