= Hum Intezaar Karenge =

- VCD Cover
- Directed by: Prabhat Roy
- Produced by: Neelima Paul
- Starring: Mithun Chakraborty; Padmini Kolhapure; Vinod Mehra; Shakti Kapoor
- Music by: Bappi Lahiri
- Release date: 3 March 1989
- Running time: 140 minutes
- Country: India
- Language: Hindi

Hum Intezaar Karenge is a 1989 Indian Hindi-language film directed by Prabhat Roy. It stars Mithun Chakraborty, Padmini Kolhapure, Vinod Mehra, Shakti Kapoor, Shafi Inamdar, and Dina Pathak in pivotal roles. The music was composed by Bappi Lahiri.

== Cast ==
- Mithun Chakraborty as Ajay
- Padmini Kolhapure as Manisha
- Vinod Mehra as Ravi
- Shakti Kapoor as Kundan
- Shafi Inamdar as Barrister Vikas Anand
- Beena Banerjee as Jyoti
- Urmila Bhatt as Jyoti's mother
- Dina Pathak as Ravi's mother
- Shiva Rindani as Shankar
- Birbal as Pinto
- Mohan Choti as Taxi Driver
- Tiku Talsania as College Professor Narayan

== Soundtrack ==
Song	Singer
"Pehle Milan Ki Raat Aayi, Kitne Dinon Ke Baad Aayi"	Padmini Kolhapure, Bappi Lahiri
"Kadki Mein Ladki Mili, Kismat Ki Khidki Khuli"	Shailendra Singh, Bappi Lahiri
"Ma Maiya, Ma Maiya, Bhool Jaoge Ta Thaiya"	Vijay Benedict, Alisha Chinai
"Sahara Tere Intezaar Ka Hai"	Pankaj Udhas
"Door Hai To Kya"	Asha Bhosle
