= Chhota Sa Ghar =

Chhota Sa Ghar (1996)
- Theatrical release poster
- Directed by: Kalpataru
- Written by: Brij Katyal (dialogues)
- Screenplay by: Keshav Rathod
- Story by: Kalpataru
- Produced by: Sushil Kumar Agrawal
- Starring: Asrani; Neelima Azeem
- Cinematography: Madhav Kishan
- Music by: Rajesh Roshan
- Release date: 1996
- Running time: 141 min
- Country: India
- Language: Hindi

Chhota Sa Ghar (transl. Small house) is a 1996 Hindi-language drama-film directed and written by Kalpataru, produced by Sushil Kumar Agrawal and the music is composed by Rajesh Roshan. Other crew roles are played by the various actors and screenwriters. It is screenplayed by Keshav Rathod, while the dialogues are written by Brij Katyal. It features Neelima Azeem, Asrani, Vivek Mushran, Devayani Jayadev, Koyal, Parikshat Sahni, Beena Banerjee, and Ajinkya Deo as lead characters. It is cinematographed by Madhav Kishan.

== Cast ==
- Vivek Mushran as Vinay
- Devayani Jayadev as Vidya Sharma
- Parikshat Sahni as Dhanraj
- Beena Banerjee as Savitri
- Ajinkya Deo as Vikas
- Neelima Azeem as Agni Luthura
- Asrani as Ishrat
- Tiku Talsania as Narayan Sharma
- Ashok Saraf as Shakkiram
- Rajesh Khattar as Dinesh Bansal
- Rubina as Kamini
- Sameer Khakhar as Vidya,s moloester Sewakram
- Salim Motu as Dayal

== Soundtrack ==
Chhota Sa Ghar

Soundtrack album by Rajesh Roshan
- Genre: Feature film soundtrack

- Tu Jhuth Bolta Hai - Kumar Sanu, Sadhana Sargam
- Sorry Sorry Galati Ho Gayi - Kumar Sanu, Sadhana Sargam
- Allah Jane - Kumar Sanu, Sadhana Sargam
- Koi Bataye Ke Swarg Kaisa Hoga - Udit Narayan, Suhasini Nandgaonkar
- Chal Mundia Mandir Main - Alka Yagnik
- Parody - Sudesh Bhosle, Poornima
