= Janta Hawaldar =

- Lobby card
- Directed by: Mehmood
- Starring: Rajesh Khanna; Yogita Bali; Ashok Kumar; Hema Malini; Mehmood
- Music by: Rajesh Roshan
- Release date: 27 April 1979
- Country: India
- Language: Hindi

Janta Havaldar (transl. The people's Havildar) is a 1979 Indian Hindi-language film directed by Mehmood, with Rajesh Khanna playing the title role, paired opposite Yogita Bali. The film has Ashok Kumar and Hema Malini making extended guest appearances. This film was not commercially successful at the time of its release. However over the years, the film has been appreciated by the audiences in its screening on television and has gained a cult following over the years. This movie has songs sung by a newcomer Anwar as Kishore Kumar refused to sing for the movie as it had his ex-wife Yogita Bali in the lead.

== Cast ==
- Rajesh Khanna as Constable Janta Prasad.
- Hema Malini as Deepa
- Ashok Kumar as Peter Ferandes
- Yogeeta Bali as Sunaina
- Shailendra Singh as Anand
- Leela Chitnis as Gauri
- Lalita Pawar as Sarojini
- Dhumal as Doodh Nath
- Mehmood as Mahesh Chand
- Shubha Khote as Sheela
- Kanhaiyalal (actor) as Jagat Narayan
- Narendra Nath as Shekhar

== Plot ==
Janta, a naive and simple minded young man wants to join the police force by following the footsteps of his grandfather and father. He is eventually accepted into the police force as a constable, with the support of his new friends- the police commissioner and his daughter Deepa. Janta unintentionally becomes very successful in his work, meets the blind florist Sunaina and falls in love with her. Janta makes some enemies including Sunaina's uncle who is hiding a secret and is scared that Janta will expose him. Will Janta be able to escape the evil plans of his enemies who want to get him fired from the police? Will he expose the secret of Sunaina's uncle and marry her? Or will things turn against him?

== Music ==
| # | Song | Singer |
|---|---|---|
| 1 | "Teri Aankhon Ki Chaahat Mein" | Anwar |
| 2 | "Humse Ka Bhool Huyi" | Anwar |
| 3 | "Aadhi Roti Saara Kabaab" | Lata Mangeshkar, Anwar |
| 4 | "Badaam Onho Laate" | Usha Mangeshkar, Mehmood |
| 5 | "Are Zulekha Kahan Hai Ri Tu" | Mehmood |
