= Dhoop Chhaon (1977 film) =

1977 film directed by Prahlad Sharma

- Directed by: Prahlad Sharma
- Written by: Prahlad Sharma, U.B. Mathur
- Produced by: S.N. Jain
- Starring: Sanjeev Kumar; Hema Malini; Yogeeta Bali; Om Shivpuri
- Cinematography: Gopi Krishna; Satyanarayan
- Edited by: Prabhakar Supare
- Music by: Shankar–Jaikishan
- Release date: 23 March 1977
- Country: India
- Language: Hindi

Dhoop Chhaon (transl. Sunlight and Shade) is a 1977 Hindi film. Directed and written by Prahlad Sharma, the film stars Sanjeev Kumar, Hema Malini, Yogeeta Bali, Om Shivpuri, Nazir Hussain, Gajanan Jagirdar, Dinesh Hingoo and Yunus Parvez. The film's music is by Shankar–Jaikishan and Lyrics by Kaifi Azmi, Vithalbhai Patel, Vishveshwar Sharma, Virendra Mishra. Screenplay of the movie is co-written by U.B. Mathur.

Hema Malini plays the part of a woman who is forced into prostitution after going blind.

== Plot ==
Dr. D.D. Sinha solicits a number from conspicuous specialists to go to far off rustic town in India and treat the weak and keep the infection from spreading. Dr. Paras, who is a trainee of Dr. D.D. Sinha, is set up to go there. Dr. Paras goes there, works with local people to thwart the disease and treats the feeble, and is successful in preventing it's spreading to various organizations. He meets with town magnificence, Lajwanti pen name, and both start to look all idealistic at each other. Paras promises to return and marry her. Lajjo foresees his return, anyway he doesn't reestablish, the residents affront her, beat her senseless, she loses her vision, is grabbed and sold into prostitution. By then one day she gets an amazing ally, none other Dr. Paras, who is as of now associated with to Dr. Sinha's daughter, sensory system pro Manju, and should help Lajjo's sight is returning. The request is will Lajjo recognize any help from a man who deceived her, and is genuinely liable for her present issue.

== Cast ==
- Sanjeev Kumar as Dr. Paras
- Hema Malini as Lajwanti a.k.a. lajjo
- Yogeeta Bali as Dr. Manju Sinha
- Om Shivpuri as Dr. D.D. Sinha
- Nazir Hussain as Choudhary
- Gajanan Jagirdar as Abdul
- Dinesh Hingoo as Totaram
- Badri Prasad as Pandit
- Shaukat Azmi as Pandit's Wife
- Yunus Parvez as Pandit's servant

== Soundtrack ==
#	Title	Singer(s)
1	"Ek Shehri Chhora Teer Kaleje"	Usha Mangeshkar, Kalyani Mitra
2	"Jode Mein Gajra Mat Bandho"	Mohammed Rafi
3	"Bheegi Bheegi Raat Suhani"	Lata Mangeshkar
4	"Jis Roop Mein Bhi Aao"	Asha Bhosle
