= Johnny Kastl =

American lawyer, former (2001–2009) actor

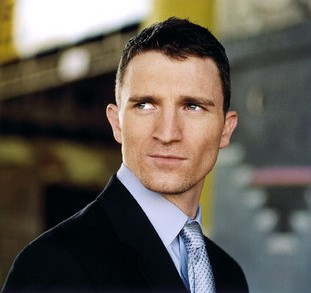
- Born: Oklahoma, U.S.
- Occupations: Actor, lawyer
- Years active: 2001–2009

Johnny Kastl is an American lawyer and former actor, perhaps best known for his recurring role as Dr. Doug Murphy on the medical comedy Scrubs (2001–2009). He made cameo appearances in several Hollywood productions and played other parts on television, including the role of Todd Jaracki on The Beast (2009).

== Early life ==
Born in Oklahoma and raised in Texas, he attended Washington University in St. Louis, where he double-majored in Biology and Drama. He acted in many plays and was a co-founder and active member of a student sketch comedy group called "The Kaktabulz".

== Career ==
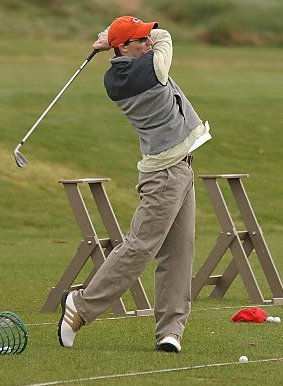
Kastl on the set of The Big-Break All Star Challenge (2006)

Kastl has made appearances in the blockbuster films Hulk and War of the Worlds.

Kastl had a recurring role on Scrubs for 8 years from 2001 to 2009 as Dr. Doug Murphy, the totally incompetent doctor who finally finds his calling as a very competent forensic pathologist. However, he asked to be allowed to "sit out" the fourth season of Scrubs as he had broken both his heels in a ski jumping accident. This was written into the show to keep the character around and, as described on the DVD commentary by creator Bill Lawrence, "We felt that breaking both of his feet was a very 'Doug' thing to do, so we decided to write it into the show."

He had a recurring role, as FBI agent Todd Jaracki, for the single season of Patrick Swayze's The Beast (2009).

== Personal life ==
Prior to moving to Los Angeles, Johnny was employed as a Manager at Microsoft in Chicago, Illinois.

He is an avid golfer and won The Golf Channel's 2006 The Big-Break All Star Challenge Scrubs competition, beating out Robert Maschio ("The Todd") in the final match.

While attending law school at the University of Iowa, he worked as a law clerk at the U.S. Attorney's Office. He practiced law in Chicago, Illinois, at the law firms of Katten Muchin Rosenman and Dentons before becoming a Founding Member (and VP of Business Development and Strategic Partnerships) of Acorn Finance.

== Filmography ==
- The Tempest (2001) - Boatswain
- I Dreamt of Bombay (2002) - Bobby
- Girlfriends (2002) - Guy
- Hulk (2003) - Soldier
- Ball & Chain (2004) - Monty
- War of the Worlds (2005) - Boston Soldier
- Over There (2005) - Sergeant First Class Neeson
- Cold Case (2006) - Wes Floyd
- Veronica Mars (2007)
- I Gotta Be Better Than Keanu (2007) - Slimy Agent
- Scrubs (2001–2009) - Dr. Doug Murphy
- The Beast (2009) - Todd Jaracki
