= Yogeeta Bali =

Indian actress (born 1952)

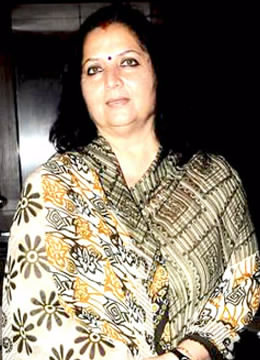
- Yogeeta Bali in 2011
- Born: 13 August 1952 (age 74)
- Occupation: Actress
- Years active: 1971–1989
- Spouses: Kishore Kumar (m. 1976; div. 1978) Mithun Chakraborty (m. 1979)
- Children: 4, including Mahaakshay and Ushmey
- Relatives: Geeta Bali (aunt); Aditya Raj Kapoor (cousin); Hemlata (sister-in-law)

Yogeeta Bali (born 13 August 1952) is an Indian former Bollywood actress. Bali is known for her supporting roles in various films from the 1970s to the1980s. She is the niece of late actress Geeta Bali and the wife of actor Mithun Chakraborty.

== Biography ==
Yogeeta Bali was born on 13 August 1952, to actors Syed Irshad Hussain and Hardarshan Kaur. A cousin of filmmaker Abrar Alvi, Hussain shifted to the newly created Pakistan in mid 1950s, leaving his wife and children in India. Hardarshan was the elder sister of actress Geeta Bali, who became a part of the Kapoor family upon marrying Shammi Kapoor.

Yogeeta married Kishore Kumar in 1976 and divorced him in 1978. She then married Mithun Chakraborty in 1979. They have three sons - Mahaakshay, Ushmey, Namashi - and a daughter, Dishani.

Mahaakshay, a.k.a. "Mimoh", is an actor, while Namashi is going to debut in the film Bad Boy.

== Filmography ==
Year	Film	Role	Note
1971	Parwana	Asha Varma/Nirmala	
1971	Ganga Tera Pani Amrit	Manju	
1971	Memsaab	Kiran	
1971	Mere Apne	Urmi	
1971	Parde Ke Peechey	Tara	
1972	Buniyaad		
1972	Sazaa		
1972	Zameen Aasmaan	Roopa	
1973	Nirdosh	Roopa	
1973	Jheel Ke Us Paar	Jugnu	
1973	Banarasi Babu	Gulabiya	
1973	Ek Mutthi Aasmaan	Sarla	
1973	Gaddar	Reshma	
1973	Nafrat	Kiran	
1973	Samjhauta	Shanno	
1973	Yauwan	Shashi	
1974	Kunwara Baap	Cameo	
1974	Ajanabee	Sonia	
1974	Apradhi		
1974	Sauda	Renu	
1974	Azad Mohabbat		
1974	Charitraheen		
1974	Chowkidar	Radha	
1974	Kisan Aur Bhagwan		
1974	Ujala Hi Ujala	Anuradha	
1975	Zindagi Aur Toofan		
1975	Mrig Trishna	Rajkumari Sandhya	
1976	Mehbooba	Jamuna Singh	
1976	Khaan Dost	Shanti	
1976	Nagin	Rita	
1976	Lagaam		
1976	Sawa Lakh Se Ek Ladaun		
1976	Raees		
1977	Chacha Bhatija	Pinky	
1977	Dhoop Chhaon	Dr. Manju Sinha	
1977	Daku Aur Mahatma	Vandana	
1977	Mandir Masjid	Salma	
1977	Kaali Raat		
1978	Bhakti Mein Shakti	Dammo	
1978	Ek Baap Chhe Bete	Shalu	
1978	Karmayogi	Jyoti/Juliet	
1978	Premi Gangaram		
1979	Nauker	Cameo	
1979	Aakhri Kasam	Champa	
1979	Jaani Dushman	Thakur's bride	
1979	Janata Havaldar		
1979	Salaam Memsaab	Sunita Sarit	
1979	Shabhash Daddy	Kamali	
1980	Oh Bewafa	Radha	
1980	Unees-Bees	Annu	
1980	Khwab	Maya	
1980	Pyaara Dushman		
1981	Zamaane Ko Dikhana Hai	Razia Khan	
1981	Biwi-O-Biwi	Rina	
1981	Be-shaque	Roopa	
1982	Baawri		
1982	Jaanwar	Taramati Singh	
1983	Karate	Aarti	
1984	Yeh Ishq Nahin Aasaan	Phoolrani	
1984	Laila	Sunaina	
1984	Grahasthi	Sudha	
1984	Raaj Tilak	Najma	
1984	Waqt Ki Pukar	Raja's girlfriend	
1987	Mera Karam Mera Dharam	Neela	
1989	Aakhri Badla	Leena	
2013	Enemmy	Producer	
