= Yeh Ishq Nahin Aasaan =

- Directed by: Tinnu Anand
- Produced by: Bitu Anand; Naresh Malhotra
- Starring: Rishi Kapoor; Padmini Kolhapure; Deepti Naval; Yogeeta Bali
- Music by: Laxmikant–Pyarelal
- Release date: 21 December 1984
- Country: India
- Language: Hindi

Yeh Ishq Nahin Aasaan (transl. This love is not so easy) is a 1984 Indian Bollywood film directed by Tinnu Anand. It stars Rishi Kapoor and Padmini Kolhapure in pivotal roles.

== Cast ==
- Rishi Kapoor as Salim Ahmed Salim
- Padmini Kolhapure as Salma Mirza
- Deepti Naval as Sahira
- Yogeeta Bali as Phoolrani
- Om Prakash as Nawab
- Iftekhar as Akhtar Mirza
- Asrani as Jamal

== Plot ==
Architect and Poet Salim Ahmed Salim lives in Nizamuddin along with his widowed mother. He re-locates to Lucknow where he is employed with Shirazi & Company. This is where he meets his attractive neighbor, Salma Khan, and both fall in love much to the chagrin of her widower dad, Hamid, who had promised her mother that he will get her married to a wealthy man named Anwar. He instructs her not to leave the house, and when she persists, he sells the house and decides to re-locate to Lahore, Pakistan. Salim attempts to stop them but Hamid assaults him and leaves him senseless. Salim does recover but takes to alcohol and a courtesan named Phoolrani in a big way. His mother intervenes, and compels him to marry their new neighbor's daughter, Sahira, which he reluctantly does. Now trapped in a marriage with a woman he does not love, Salim continues to frequent Phoolrani's brothel, with hopes of being re-united with his estranged sweetheart – only to find that the seemingly demure Sahira will not let go of him that easily.

== Songs ==
Lyrics: Anand Bakshi

Song	Singer
"Likha Hai Mere Dil Pe Tera Hi Naam" (Sad)	Lata Mangeshkar
"Likha Hai Mere Dil Pe Tera Hi Naam" (Happy)	Lata Mangeshkar, Shabbir Kumar
"Yeh Ishq Nahin Aasaan, Yeh Ishq Nahin"	Suresh Wadkar, Shabbir Kumar, Mahendra Kapoor
"Dilrubaon Se Pyar Na Karna, Bewafaon Se Pyar Na Karna"	Anwar, Asha Bhosle
"Mere Khayalon Ki Rahaguzar Se"	Anwar
"Tere Hijaab Ne Mujhe Shair Bana Diya"	Anwar
