= Suhaagan =

- Theatrical release poster
- Directed by: K. Raghavendra Rao
- Written by: Kader Khan (dialogues)
- Screenplay by: K. Raghavendra Rao
- Story by: Panchu Arunachalam
- Based on: Engeyo Ketta Kural (1982)
- Produced by: M. Arjuna Raju
- Starring: Jeetendra; Sridevi; Padmini Kolhapure
- Cinematography: K. S. Prakash
- Edited by: Kotagiri Venkateswara Rao
- Music by: Bappi Lahari
- Production company: Roja Enterprises
- Release date: 14 March 1986
- Running time: 143 minutes
- Country: India
- Language: Hindi

Suhaagan (transl. Married woman) is a 1986 Indian Hindi-language drama film, produced by M. Arjuna Raju under the Roja Enterprises banner and directed by K. Raghavendra Rao. It stars Jeetendra, Sridevi, Padmini Kolhapure and music composed by Bappi Lahari. The film is a remake of the Tamil film Enkeyo Ketta Kural (1982).

== Plot ==
Moreover, Masterji arrives at Janaki & Murali and tells them what they did was wrong. Janaki feels guilty, and Murli understands that Janaki doesn't want to live with him anymore. Murli arranges a house on the outskirts of Janaki's village, where he asks her to go and stay. The same night, Murali commits suicide. Janaki is surprised to see him dead; however, she leaves for her village. Everyone scolds her. Years pass, and Janaki's daughter Meena starts going to school. Janaki meets her daughter and takes her to her house every evening to play. Jyoti learns of this and scolds Janaki and Meena. In anger, she burns Meena's arm, and when Ram scolds her for that, she feels guilty and burns her own as well. Janaki falls sick and refuses to take medicines. Her mother visits her, and she asks for forgiveness. She asks her mother to tell Ram to meet her once before she dies. Ram agrees and goes to meet Janaki. Janaki cries for forgiveness, and Ram forgives her. He also promises to perform her last rites as her husband once she dies. As soon as Ram leaves, Janaki touches his slippers, which he left behind, and dies. As promised, despite objection from Jagat Prasad and the threat of being ostracized from the village, Ram and Jyoti perform Janaki's last rites.

== Cast ==
- Jeetendra as Ram
- Sridevi as Janki
- Padmini Kolhapure as Jyoti
- Raj Babbar as Murli
- Pran as Jagat Prasad
- Tanuja as Shanta
- Kader Khan as Masterji
- Shakti Kapoor as Leela Krishna
- Aruna Irani as Radha
- Chandrashekhar as Murli's grandfather
- Asrani

== Soundtrack ==
The music for the film was composed by Bappi Lahiri and written by Indeevar.

| Song | Singer |
|---|---|
| "Tu Ladki Garam Masala, Tu Ladka Garam Masala" | Kishore Kumar, S. Janaki |
| "Ghunghta, Kholna Ghunghta, Dholna, O Zara Bolna" | Kishore Kumar, Asha Bhosle |
| "Chhama Chham Chhai Chhai Chhai, Nache Ta Ta Thai Thai Thai" | Kishore Kumar, Asha Bhosle |
| "Aankhon Se Girana Na Tare, Mere Pyare" | Kishore Kumar, Asha Bhosle |
| "Kya Suraj Amber Ko Chhodke Jayega, Woh Din Kabhi Na Aayega" | Lata Mangeshkar, Shabbir Kumar |
| "Ghungta Kholna Ghungta (Version 2)" | Kishore Kumar, Asha Bhosle |
