= VD Kalra =

Vasudev Kalra
- Born: Vasudev Lal Kalra; 5 June 1936; Dera Ismail Khan, Pakistan
- Died: 9 February 1995 (59 years old)
- Education: Graduation
- Occupation: Producer
- Years active: 1972–1981
- Known for: Salaam Memsaab, Rut Rangili Aayi

VD Kalra, also known as Vasudev Kalra (1936 – 1981), was an Indian producer.

== Early life ==
Vasudev Kalra was born in a middle class Punjabi family in Dera Ismail Khan, Pakistan. Vasudev came to Amritsar, India in 1947 during the partition. He and his four brothers opened their Transportation Goods Company in Kanpur. In 1962 a manager approached Vasudev to produce a film. Vasudev thought about it and invested in his first venture titled Rut Rangili Aayi.

== Career ==
=== Rut Rangili Aayi and fame in Bollywood ===
Starring Bharat Bhushan, Rut Rangili Aayi released in 1972. The story revolves around a wealthy man who falls in love with a poor girl. The film was directed by none other than the manager M.M. Pushakaran, who approached Vasudev for the movie. Rut Rangili opened to poor numbers and was a flop. After this disappointment Vasudev left the film industry.

=== 1979 Salaam Memsaab ===
VD returned to the film industry with his new comedy film Salaam Memsaab, starring Asrani and Zarina Wahab in lead roles. The film was a comedy and a comeback for VD Kalra as a producer. The film got better numbers than VD's last film, but due to a court case delay it could get a limited release. The film performed below average. This marked the end of Roshan Films Pvt. Ltd. and Vasudev Kalra as a producer.

== Last years and death ==
After quitting the film industry Vasudev again started working in his Transportation Goods Company. One evening in 1996 Vasudev Kalra died of cardiac arrest in a hospital in Kanpur.
