= Paraya Ghar =

- Directed by: Kalpataru
- Produced by: S Waris Ali
- Starring: Rishi Kapoor; Jaya Prada
- Music by: Laxmikant–Pyarelal
- Release date: 9 June 1989
- Country: India
- Language: Hindi

Paraya Ghar is a 1989 Bollywood film directed by Kalpataru and starring Rishi Kapoor, Jaya Prada, Raj Babbar, Aruna Irani, Madhavi, Sachin Pilgaonkar, Tanuja and Kader Khan.

== Soundtrack ==
Music is composed by Laxmikant–Pyarelal, while the songs are written by Hasan Kamal.

#	Title	Singer(s)
1	"Dulhan Tujhe Banaunga"	Suresh Wadkar, Anuradha Paudwal
2	"Humre Jiyara Ka Ghungroo"	Alka Yagnik, Mohammad Aziz
3	"Pyar Mil Gaya"	Alka Yagnik
4	"Saajan Se Milne Jana Hain"	Anuradha Paudwal
5	"Humse Kiya Tha Tune Jhoota Waada"	Anuradha Paudwal
