= Ghar Ki Izzat (1994 film) =

- Theatrical release poster
- Directed by: Kalptaru
- Written by: Kader Khan (dialogues); Anjaan (lyrics)
- Screenplay by: Keshav Rathod; Kalptaru
- Story by: Keshav Rathod; Kalptaru
- Based on: Banga Kora
- Produced by: Kanu Chauhan
- Starring: Jeetendra; Rishi Kapoor; Kader Khan; Asha Parekh; Juhi Chawla; Anita Raj
- Edited by: Anil-Kamal
- Music by: Amar-Utpal
- Production company: Raj Sun Films
- Release date: 23 October 1994
- Running time: 133 minutes
- Country: India
- Language: Hindi

Ghar Ki Izzat (transl. Honour of the House) is a 1994 Hindi-language drama film, produced by Kanu Chauhan under the Raj Sun Films banner and directed by Kalpataru. It stars Jeetendra, Rishi Kapoor, Kader Khan, Asha Parekh, Juhi Chawla, and Anita Raj , with the music composed by Amar-Utpal. The film is a remake of Prosenjit Chatterjee starrer Bengali film Bhanga Gora (1990).

== Cast ==
- Kader Khan as Ram Kumar
- Asha Parekh as Seeta
- Rishi Kapoor as Mohan Kumar
- Juhi Chawla as Geeta
- Jeetendra as Dr. Sohan Kumar
- Anita Raj as Sheela
- Kanu Chauhan as Shyam Kumar
- Sonika Gill as Mona
- Gulshan Grover as Sheethal
- Om Prakash as Sheethal's father
- Satyendra Kapoor as Din Dayal
- Chandrashekhar as Surinder Mehra
- Satish Shah as Nandulal
- Asrani as Bhola
- Birbal as Munshi Lal
- Bindu as Rani
- Shammi as Bua

== Soundtrack ==
#	Title	Singer(s)
1	"Bhaiya Mere Ram"	Mohammed Aziz, Suresh Wadkar, Jayashree Shivaram
2	"Rajai Bin Ratiyan"	Usha Mangeshkar, Jaishree Shivram
3	"Main Tumse Pyar Karta"	Suresh Wadkar, Jaishree Shivram
4	"Mausam Ye Suhana Hai"	Asha Bhosle, Suresh Wadkar
5	"Bewafa Bewafa Ho Tum"	Kumar Sanu
6	"Main Tumse Pyar Karta"	Pankaj Udhas, Jaishree Shivram
7	"Bholi Surat Wala"	Mohammad Aziz, Anuradha Paudwal
