= Professor Ki Padosan =

1994 film by Shantilal Soni

- Directed by: Shantilal Soni
- Written by: Bhushan Banmali
- Produced by: Kant Kumar
- Starring: Sanjeev Kumar; Asha Parekh; Padmini Kolhapure; Shekhar Suman
- Music by: R. D. Burman
- Release date: 20 December 1993
- Country: India
- Language: Hindi

Professor Ki Padosan is a 1993 Indian comedy drama film directed by Shantilal Soni. The film stars Sanjeev Kumar, Asha Parekh, Padmini Kolhapure, Shekhar Suman in the lead roles, with Deven Verma, Aruna Irani, Dalip Tahil in supporting roles.

This marked Kumar's last film appearance and was posthumously released more than 8 years after his death in 1985. Amitabh Bachchan serves as the narrator of the film and is shown paying tribute to Kumar in the end credits.

== Cast ==
- Sanjeev Kumar as Professor Vidyadhar
- Asha Parekh as Shobha
- Padmini Kolhapure as Meenaka D. Khanna
- Shekhar Suman as Vinod
- Deven Verma as Pyarelal
- Aruna Irani as Manda
- Dalip Tahil as Ranjeet D. Das
- Anant Mahadevan as Vaidyaji
- Abhi Bhattacharya as Dr. Dharam Das (Scientist)
- Amitabh Bachchan as Narrator

== Production ==
The film started production in the 1980s, but was left incomplete with its leading actor Sanjeev Kumar's death in November 1985. Ravi Tandon was the original director but left the film after Kumar's death and replaced by Shantilal Soni. At the time of his death, the film was only 75% complete and the script was subsequently changed to make his character invisible in the remaining portions of the film and complete it for release in 1993. Shekhar Suman and Dalip Tahil were added to the cast after Kumar's death. Sudesh Bhosle did the dubbing for Kumar in the film. Amitabh Bachchan was used as a narrator and paid tribute to Kumar in the final scene of the film.

== Music ==
Song	Singer
"Mile Jhoomke Milan Rut Aayi"	Lata Mangeshkar, Anup Jalota
"Modern Girl Pahan Ke Chhote Diamond"	Alka Yagnik, Sudesh Bhosle
"Main Hoon, Tu Hai Aur Tanhai"	Kavita Krishnamurthy, Sudesh Bhosle
"Aisi Jaldi Bhi Kya Hai Sanam"	Alka Yagnik, Kavita Krishnamurthy
