= Yauwan =

- Directed by: Ranjan Bose
- Produced by: N.P. Singh
- Starring: Anil Dhawan; Yogeeta Bali; Sujit Kumar; Kabir Bedi
- Music by: Sonik-Omi
- Release date: 22 March 1973
- Language: Hindi

Yauwan is an Indian film from 1973 which stars Anil Dhawan, Yogeeta Bali, Sujit Kumar, and Kabir Bedi.

== Plot ==
When Shashi's (Yogeeta Bali) health is threatened, her family seeks answers from physicians—who suggest that her illness's origins are psychological. As her condition soon worsens, her desperate family finds a psychiatrist, Dr. Prem (Anil Dhawan) who helps her, and she gradually improves. In the process, Shashi and Dr. Prem fall madly in love.

== Soundtrack ==
The music of the film was composed by Sonik-Omi, while lyrics were written by Omkar Verma.

1. "Tumhari Berukhi Se Pareshan" – Kishore Kumar
