= Jasmin (Indian actress) =

Indian film actress

- Born: 1966 (age 59)
- Occupation: Actress
- Years active: 1979–1990

Jasmin Dhunna is a former Indian actress who acted in a few Hindi films. Her notable film was Veerana (1988), produced and directed by the Ramsay Brothers.

== Biography ==
Jasmin made her Bollywood debut at the age of 13 in 1979 with the film Sarkari Mehmaan, which started Vinod Khanna. She then worked as a model and in 1984, her film Divorce was released. In 1988, she starred in the Ramsay Brothers horror film Veerana as a witch.

Her career and whereabouts after this film are not clearly known. In a 2017 interview with the Hindustan Times, Shyam Ramsay stated that Jasmin still lived in Mumbai and that she had retired from films after her mother died. Though he had plans to cast her in a sequel to Veerana.

== Filmography ==
Year	Film	Role	Notes
1979	Sarkari Mehmaan	Bindiya	Debut film
1984	Divorce	Seema / Geeta	
1988	Veerana	Jasmine	
