= Aisa Pyaar Kahan =

1986 Hindi-language film directed by Vijay Sadanah

- Theatrical release poster
- Directed by: Vijay Sadanah
- Screenplay by: Amir Swamji
- Story by: Amir Swamji
- Based on: Pasamalar (Tamil)(1961)
- Produced by: Tutu Sharma
- Starring: Jeetendra; Mithun Chakraborty; Jaya Prada; Padmini Kolhapure
- Cinematography: S.L.Sharma
- Edited by: Govind Dalwadi
- Music by: Laxmikant–Pyarelal
- Production company: TUTU Films
- Release date: 14 November 1986
- Running time: 140 minutes
- Country: India
- Language: Hindi

Aisa Pyar Kahan (transl. Where is love like this?) is a 1986 Hindi-language drama film, produced by Pradeep Sharma under the TUTU Films banner and directed by Vijay Sadanah. It stars Jeetendra, Mithun Chakraborty, Jaya Prada, and Padmini Kolhapure and the music is composed by Laxmikant–Pyarelal. The film is remake of the Telugu movie Rakta Sambandham (1962), which itself was a remake of the Tamil movie Pasamalar (1961) and has already been remade in Hindi as Rakhi (1962). Ultimately once again in Telugu as Anna Chellelu (1993).

== Cast ==
- Jeetendra as Sagar
- Mithun Chakraborty as Suraj
- Jaya Prada as Sarita Khanna
- Padmini Kolhapure as Pooja
- Vinod Mehra as Deepak Khanna
- Asrani as Kasthuri
- Jagdeep as Bhootnath
- Bindu as Kalpana
- Manmohan Krishna Money lender Din Dayal
- Vikas Anand as Court Receiver Mohandas Gandhi
- Gurubachan as Corrupt employee Jaggu

== Soundtrack ==
Lyrics by: Anand Bakshi.

#	Title	Singer(s)
1	"Pagal Premi Kaise Hote Hai"	Shailendra Singh, Anuradha Paudwal
2	"Chal Musafir Chal Kahin Koi"	Mohammed Aziz
3	"Teri Bagon Ki Bulbul"	Kavita Krishnamurthy
4	"Aisa Pyaar Kahan"	Mohammed Aziz
5	"Kya Kehna Kya Jodi Hai"	Kavita Krishnamurthy, Shailendra Singh, Mohammed Aziz
6	"Saawan Ka Mahina Aa Gaya"	Mohammed Aziz, Kavita Krishnamurthy
7	"Aisa Pyaar Kahan" (part)	Mohammed Aziz
