= Do Dishayen =

- Directed by: Dulal Guha
- Written by: Kamleshwar_(writer)
- Starring: Dharmendra; Hema Malini; Prem Chopra
- Music by: Laxmikant–Pyarelal
- Release date: 1982
- Country: India
- Language: Hindi

Do Dishayen is a 1982 Bollywood romantic drama film starring Dharmendra, Hema Malini and Prem Chopra directed by Dulal Guha.

== Plot ==
Ajitesh is a wealthy businessman, whose wife Maya leaves him after the birth of their kid named Arunesh. When Arun craves for his mother's love, Ajit manages to calm him down by lying about the whereabouts of his mother. One fine day, Arun walks into a store and finds Uma, who looks exactly like his mother. He convinces her to come to his house but before he could introduce her to his father, she goes away.

== Cast ==
- Dharmendra as Ajitesh
- Hema Malini as Maya/Uma(Double Role)
- Shreeram Lagoo as Bhupesh
- Nirupa Roy as Neeru
- Prem Chopra as Jagan
- Aruna Irani as Reena
- Satyen Kappu as Dr. Vinay
- Baby Pinky as Arunesh, Ajitesh's son
- Asit Sen as Hariya
- Nargis Rabadi as Mrs. Rustamjee
- Manik Dutt as Maya's Uncle
- Dulari as Maya's Aunty
- Rajan Haskar as Nivaran Sharma
- Asha Sharma as Mrs. Nivaran Sharma
- Sudhir Pandey as Swamiji

== Music ==
All songs are music by Laxmikant–Pyarelal and written by Anand Bakshi.

Song	Singer
"Koi Kya Kare" - 1	K. J. Yesudas
"Koi Kya Kare" - 2	K. J. Yesudas
"Koi Kya Kare" - 3	K. J. Yesudas
"Kisi Ko Phool Mile" - 1	Lata Mangeshkar
"Kisi Ko Phool Mile" - 2	Lata Mangeshkar
"Main Tere Paas Hoon"	Asha Bhosle, Anwar
