= Baawri =

1982 film by A. C. Tirulokchandar

- Poster
- Directed by: A. C. Tirulokchandar
- Screenplay by: Ram Govind
- Produced by: G. Gopal Krishnan
- Starring: Rakesh Roshan; Jaya Prada; Yogeeta Bali; Nirupa Roy
- Music by: Zahur Khayyam
- Release date: 1982
- Country: India
- Language: Hindi

Baawri is a 1982 Bollywood film directed by A. C. Tirulokchandar, starring Jaya Prada, Yogeeta Bali and Shreeram Lagoo. The film was a remake of the director's own Tamil film Bhadrakali.

== Plot ==
Gayathri, a docile Brahmin girl, is married to Shyam, a conservative Brahmin. Gayathri suffers from a fear psychosis and gets frightened of even small things. They are a happy couple with an infant daughter named Sudha. Once Gayathri attends an interview and returns home dazed. From then on, her behaviour becomes abnormal and unpredictable, which affects her family life. Slowly, she loses her mental balance and people around her, including her child, husband and mother-in-law, are afraid to come anywhere near her. Nobody is able to comprehend the basis for her erratic behaviour and all efforts to get her treated fail. She accidentally kills her child, after which Shyam's mother advises him to divorce her and remarry, and he relents. Gayathri is taken back to her parents’ home by her father.Shyam marries Jwala, the daughter of an advocate, on the persuasion of his mother. Jwala learns about Ganesh's first marriage and subsequent divorce only after the wedding. Though Jwala is initially upset, she gets reconciled. The mentally imbalanced Gayathri keeps visiting Ganesh's house even after their divorce. One day, she barges into their bedroom and attacks Jwala when she is intimate with Ganesh. An upset Ganesh advises Gayathri's father to move her out of town and he complies. Jwala gives birth to Ganesh's daughter . Gayathri's life takes a new turn in the new town. An unknown person attempts to kill her when she is alone; she fights him and gets injured in the process. As a result, she regains her memory and sanity, and recollects what happened to her. Gayathri reveals to her parents that what she went through and why she behaved in an unpredictable manner. On the day she was returning from the interview, she witnessed a person murdering a girl in an isolated bungalow. Since Gayathri was the only witness, the murderer chased her and attempted to kill her. In the process, she lost her mental balance out of fear. Her parents become happy with her return to normalcy. She understands the changed scenario of her life, including the death of her child and divorce, and reconciles to live alone. She takes up a job and refuses to collect further alimony from Ganesh. Rukmini is kidnapped by Kundan, who previously worked as Jwala's driver and had fallen in love with her. Jwala's father had implicated Kundan in a false case and got him arrested to keep him away from Jwala. Exploiting Kundan absence, he got Jwala married to Shyam . To take revenge, Kandappan has kidnapped Jwala's daughter and demands that Jwala have sex with him for getting her child back. Jwala reaches his place and prays for her escape with the child. At the same time, Gayathri, who learns about the kidnapping from her mother-in-law, reaches the spot. She recognises Kundan as the murderer. After becoming possessed by goddess Bhadrakali, she fights Kundan who ultimately dies after being impaled. Gayathri, who was also injured, succumbs in Shyam's arms after having saved his daughter.

== Cast ==
- Rakesh Roshan as Shyam Bhardwaj
- Jaya Prada as Gayatri
- Yogeeta Bali as Jwala
- Nirupa Roy as Laxmi
- Shreeram Lagoo as Rajaram Sharma
- Asrani as Pandit Bansilal Shastri
- Seema Deo as Mrs. Bhardwaj

== Music ==
The music director for the film was Khayyam and the lyricist was Maya Govind.

No.	Title	Singer(s)	Length
1.	"Ab Charaghon Ka Koi Kam Nahin"	K. J. Yesudas, Lata Mangeshkar
2.	"Hey Ambike, Jagadambike, Hey Maa"	Asha Bhosle
3.	"Sanwaria Ki Sanwri"	Mahendra Kapoor
4.	"Aai Karke Singhar Tohe Nindia Lagi"	Asha Bhosle
5.	"Kahan Phansi Jan"	Asha Bhosle
6.	"More Naino Me Shyam Samaye"	Lata Mangeshkar
