= Chowkidar =

- Directed by: Shyam Ralham
- Starring: Sanjeev Kumar; Yogeeta Bali; Vinod Khanna; Om Prakash; Jeevan
- Music by: Madan Mohan
- Release date: 1974
- Country: India
- Language: Hindi

Chowkidar is a 1974 Bollywood drama film directed by Shyam Ralham. The film stars Sanjeev Kumar, Yogeeta Bali, Vinod Khanna, Om Prakash, Jeevan in pivotal roles.

== Plot ==
Shambhu (Om Prakash) is a village Chowkidar (night watchman), who is helpful to the poor that are oppressed by Lala Dinanath (Jeevan). He has a sister who was missing for about a year. One night during the patrol, he finds his sister coming from the house of the village chief Thakur Ranvir Singh (D. K. Sapru). It turns out that his sister had a love affair with the Thakur and went into hiding once she got pregnant and now the Thakur is not accepting the girl child. Shambhu's sister hands him the baby and commits suicide by jumping into a nearby river. Shambhu first takes the baby girl to Thakur, who again rejects the baby and dies accidentally in an attempt to shoot at Shambhu. Shambhu raises the girl child on his own. Meanwhile, Lala Dinanath has a son, whom he sent to the city for higher education and to become a doctor. He expects that his doctor son will help him in earning more money by exploiting the poor villagers. Thakur also has a son, whom he also sent to city for better education. After few years, Dinanath's son Shyam (Sanjeev Kumar), now a doctor, returns to village and is appalled by the condition of the village and finds out that his father is the main reason. He decides to stay in the village and nurse them to wipe away his father's sins. Dr. Shyam's kindness toward the village people earns his respect and praise all around, but makes his father angry, as he is not earning any money. He subsequently forms a romantic relationship with Shambhu's grown up niece Radha (Yogeeta Bali).

Thakur's son Gopal (Vinod Khanna) becomes a playboy and return home to occupy his father's position, with his friend Vilaitiram (Ram Mohan). Vilaitiram is looking for an opportunity to blackmail Gopal with the help of dancer Bela (Jayshree T.). When Gopal tries to make advances toward Radha when he sees her for first time, she resists and ends up injuring Gopal. With the help of Vilaitiram, Gopal sends his goons to kill Radha, but Dr. Shyam saves her. Realising that he can never lay hands on Radha as long as Shyam is present, Gopal calls Bela to the village. Bela traps Shyam in a small home and accuses him of raping her in front of the whole village. Heartbroken, Radha and Shambhu decide to leave the village. As the job is done by Bela, she is no longer required and Vilaitiram tries to kill her. Again, Shyam comes and saves her. Now realising her mistake, she confesses everything to Shyam. Meanwhile, Gopal's goon had kidnapped Radha. So, now vindicated, Shyam goes to save Radha and just reaches in time. A fight starts between Gopal and Shyam. Gopal's paternal aunt comes and stops the fight. She tells everyone that Radha is actually Gopal's sister, a secret she and Shambhu had been hiding since long ago, but now it is necessary to tell everyone. Deeply ashamed, Gopal decides to self immolate and burns the house. But Radha and others forgive him and stop him from killing himself. The story ends in peace with Gopal accepting Radha as his sister.

== Cast ==
- Sanjeev Kumar as Dr. Shyam
- Yogeeta Bali as Radha
- Vinod Khanna as Gopal
- Om Prakash as Shambhu
- Jeevan as Lala Dinanath
- Ram Mohan as Vilaitiram
- D. K. Sapru as Thakur Ranveer Singh
- Asit Sen as Munim
- Sulochana as Mangala
- Jayshree T. as Bela

== Soundtrack ==
All of the songs are written by Rajinder Krishan and music by Madan Mohan.

Song	Singer
"Chaloon Main Jidhar Se, Bachke Udhar Se"	Lata Mangeshkar
"Thoda Sa Aitbaar Kijiye, Phir Zara Sa Intezar Kijiye"	Asha Bhosle
"Aji Rehne Do Chanda Badli Mein"	Asha Bhosle
"Zindagi Zindagi, Chhoti Ho Ya Lambi Ho"	Asha Bhosle, Mohammed Rafi, Mukesh
"Ek Ladki Bholi Bhali Si, Ki Jiska Naam Hai Radha"	Mohammed Rafi
"Yeh Duniya Nahin Jagir Kisi Ki"	Mohammed Rafi
