= Kabeela =

Kabeela कबीला
- Directed by: Bolu Khosla
- Written by: Akhtar Romani (dialogues)
- Screenplay by: Jayant Dharmadhikari
- Story by: A.K. Agarwal
- Produced by: Bolu Khosla
- Starring: Feroz Khan; Rekha
- Edited by: Waman Bhonsle
- Music by: Kalyanji-Anandji
- Production company: Khosla Enterprises
- Release date: 1976
- Running time: 126 minutes
- Country: India
- Language: Hindi

Kabeela is a 1976 Indian Hindi-language romantic drama film produced and directed by Bholu Khosla and starring Feroz Khan, Rekha, Bindu, Premnath in pivotal roles. The music is by Kalyanji-Anandji.

== Plot ==
Shobha lives a poor lifestyle along with her widower dad, Murari, in a village. One day a gypsy, Mangal, comes to her rescue when she gets attacked by a raging bull. They continue to meet after the incident and fall in love with each other. Shortly thereafter, she is abducted and taken to a man named Dildaar. Mangal once again saves her and takes her to her house only to find that her father has died. Lalaji, an evil man, spreads rumours about Shobha when she refuses to marry him and the villagers subsequently disown her. Will a lonely and abandoned Shobha be able to survive?

== Cast ==
- Feroz Khan as Mangal
- Rekha as Shobha
- Bindu as Bijli
- Premnath as Sardar Babbar
- Kamini Kaushal as Champakali
- Imtiaz Khan as Durjan
- Sharat Saxena as Shaitan Singh
- Harbans Darshan M Arora as Police Officer
- Sudhir as Police inspector Ajay
- Manju Asrani as Sawli
- Shyam Kumar as Dildaar
- Hiralal as Santol
- Dhumal as Lalaji
- Bhagwan Dada as Durjan's victim
- Trilok Kapoor as Santan
- Habib as Santo, the man who brings bombs
- Surendranath as Murari, Shobha's father
- V Gopal as Lala the shopkeeper

== Songs ==
Song	Singer
"Do Phool Zindagi Ke"	Lata Mangeshkar
"Koi Mane Ya Na Mane"	Lata Mangeshkar
"Koi Mane Ya Na Mane"	Kishore Kumar
"Tu Kehta Hai Mujhko Chadhi Hai, Main Kehta Hoon Tujhko"	Kishore Kumar, Mukesh
"Teri Meri Ho Gayi Yaari"	Asha Bhosle

== Reception ==
While criticising the costumes as "over-the-top attire" and the set decor as "tacky", a 2016 review in The Hindu praised the performances by Feroz Khan and Rekha and the screenplay by Jayant Dharmadhikari. The review also described the dialogue as "crisp" and the action sequences "riveting", particularly when the lead character played by Khan chases a train on horseback and runs across the entire train.
