= Nalayak =

- Poster
- Directed by: Padmanabh
- Written by: Ahzan Rizvi (dialogues); Varma Malik (lyrics)
- Screenplay by: K.A. Narayan
- Story by: K.A. Narayan
- Produced by: Jagdish Sharma
- Starring: Jeetendra; Leena Chandavarkar
- Cinematography: Kamlakar Rao
- Edited by: Das Dhaimade
- Music by: Kalyanji Anandji
- Production company: Veena Films
- Release date: 22 December 1978
- Running time: 129 mins
- Country: India
- Language: Hindi

Nalayak (transl. Unworthy) is a 1978 Hindi-language action film, produced by Jagdish C. Sharma on Veena Films banner and directed by Padmanabh. Starring Jeetendra, Leena Chandavarkar and music composed by Kalyanji Anandji.

== Plot ==
Laxman is a slacker and an unbeaten, expert gambler. He is a pampered brother of Ram Narayan and his wife Sita whom he idolizes. Anyway, Ram Narayan is annoyed by the lifestyle of Laxman and considers him the black sheep of the family. During his daily grind of gaming, Laxman meets Rita and falls for her younger sister Seema. Meanwhile, Ram Narayan holds a jewelry store, Rita asks for a charm which turns fake after delivery. Here, Ram Narayan, assures to settle the matter which follows the death of Rita, therefore, Ram Narayan is accused and sentenced. Right now, Laxman pledges to acquit his brother by jeopardizing his life. After several mysterious twists which reveals the guilty party to be Prem, a friend of Ram Narayan. At last, Laxman seizes him and safeguards his family. The movie ends with the marriage of Laxman and Seema.

== Cast ==
- Jeetendra as Laxman Narayan
- Leena Chandavarkar as Seema
- Asrani as Lallu Kumar Lalla
- Satyendra Kapoor as Ram Narayan
- Murad as Police Commissioner
- Sujit Kumar as Prem
- Raza Murad as Inspector Ramesh
- Dara Singh as Pahelwan
- Nirupa Roy as Sita Narayan
- Bindu as Rita
- Shivraj as Mala's father
- Manju Asrani as Leelu
- Master Raju as Raju
- Moolchand as Moolchandani as Customer in Casino bar
- Gurbachan Singh as Goon in Casino Bar

== Soundtrack ==
#	Title	Singer(s)
1	"Dekho Shor Na Machana"	Kishore Kumar
2	"Ye Zindagi Ek"	Kishore Kumar
3	"O Mere Dildar"	Lata Mangeshkar
4	"Duniya Ne Mujhko"	Mohammed Rafi
