= Veerana =

1988 film by Ramsay Brothers

- Theatrical release poster
- Directed by: Ramsay Brothers (Shyam Ramsay and Tulsi Ramsay)
- Written by: Ramsay Brothers
- Screenplay by: Ramsay Brothers
- Story by: Ramsay Brothers
- Produced by: Kanta Ramsay
- Starring: Jasmin Dhunna; Hemant Birje; Kulbhushan Kharbanda
- Music by: Bappi Lahiri; Anil Arun
- Release date: 6 May 1988 (India)
- Running time: 146 minutes
- Country: India
- Language: Hindi
- Budget: ₹60 Lakh
- Box office: ₹2.50 Crore in India

Veerana (transl. Deserted Place) is a 1988 Indian Hindi-language erotic supernatural horror film directed by Shyam and Tulsi Ramsay, credited as the Ramsay Brothers. It stars Jasmin as a woman who becomes possessed by the spirit of a dead witch, turning her into a bloodthirsty creature who seduces and kills men. The film's music was composed by Bappi Lahiri and songs were sung by Suman Kalyanpur, Mohammad Aziz and Sharon Prabhakar.

Made on a low budget, Veerana has been described as a cult film that garnered success on home video and in television airings. The film's antagonist, Jasmin, has been referred to as "one of the most iconic Ramsay monsters".

== Plot ==
The movie begins with priests, who surround a young boy tied up inside a cage in a cave. He pleads with them to spare him and asks what they want from him. A priest says that his blood and flesh will give life to Nakita. Just then a young woman enters the cage. She removes the bat locket from her neck, transforms into a witch and kills the boy.

Thakur Mahendera Pratap Singh finds out that a witch named Nakita is creating havoc in an adjoining forest. One night, his little daughter comes to him and says that villagers have got a dead body outside. He goes and sees the corpse of the boy, who was presumably killed by a witch. Mahendra Pratap decides to investigate for himself, and his younger brother Sameer Pratap decides to go on a witch hunt. Pratap gifts an "OM" to his brother and wishes him good luck, while giving his blessings.

Sameer drives through the forest and meets a young woman who gets a ride in Sameer's car. They arrive at the old mansion, where Sameer seduces her. He snatches the bat locket from her, but she turns into the witch Nakita. Sameer weakens her with the OM and she is taken to the village, where she is killed. A tantric known as Baba, manages to steal her body along with his followers, and takes it to the shrine, where he keeps it in a sarcophagus and promises her that he will provide her, a new body.

Sameer later goes to Mussoorie to drop his niece, Jasmin, at her boarding school, but the car overheats and stops in the forest. Sameer leaves to fetch water. However, Baba suddenly creeps out and hypnotises Jasmin, cuts a piece of her hair, and places the bottle in the witch's sarcophagus. A hypnotised Jasmin gets out of the car and walks to the shrine. Sameer returns and is shocked to find Jasmin missing, and follows her through a bushy trail. At the tomb, the witch suddenly pulls Jasmin inside. Sameer tries to save her but it's too late, as the witch's evil spirit already manages to enter Jasmin's body. Soon, Sameer is captured and killed by Baba's men.

Baba then brings Jasmin back, to the mansion. Baba informs Mahendra's family about the death of his brother, who drifted away into a river during a storm. After taking Jasmin back to her room, Thakur leaves the servants in charge of her and goes downstairs to meet Baba. Baba asks to leave, but Thakur requests that he stays back to protect his daughter. Preeti notices a difference in Jasmin's behaviour and convinces her brother-in-law to get a witch-doctor to treat Jasmin, but Nakita overhears this and kills Preeti. Thakur then decides to send his niece Sahila to stay with her grandmother for her safety.

12 years later, Thakur receives a letter from Sahila, who ranked first in her examinations. Jasmin had grown into a young woman and her moody behaviour worries her father. Thakur informs Baba that his niece wants to spend her summer vacation at his mansion. Baba directs one of his servants to kidnap Sahila to prevent her coming, but a man attacks Sahila's car and chases after her, but a man named Hemant turns up and rescues her. Back in the village, Jasmin meets a man, who is a mechanic at the fuel station. She is impressed by his works and invites him to come over to the mansion. When the man arrives, they both drink and dine together. But while drunk, he pulls Jasmin into the bed and they have sex. He wakes up at midnight, sees Jasmin laying motionless in the bed, and tries to run away frightened, but fails. Jasmin wakes up, possessed by the witch and stabs the man to death. The man's body is found by the police but it's unrecognisable. Hemant and Sahila both reach the mansion together. Thakur Saab is happy to see Sahila after being saved by Hemant, gives him a job in his timber factory, and accepts him as his son.

One evening, Jasmin takes a lift in a man's car, but the witch's spirit kills the man, by tearing through his neck. Sahila decides to sleep with Jasmin in their old bedroom, but she suddenly sees something frightening in her and informs her uncle and Hemant. Thakur decides to send his Jasmin for a psychiatric evaluation. Jasmin then recounts her past and transforms into a different person, and vows to kill every member of Thakur's family. Thakur refuses to believe the doctor, but believes him when he informs him about his daughter whom he promises to treat. The doctor also asks Hemant to be close to Jasmine, but fails.

One night, the doctor walks into Jasmin's bedroom, only to see the witch's face. The doctor runs away from the house to save his life, but is mocked by the servant Raghu, whom the doctor shuns. He leaves as Jasmin looks at him disturbingly from her balcony. While the doctor is driving his car through the old village, he crashes into a tree. The witch suddenly comes out from the shadows and turned into a bat and attacked on her face and popped out his doctor eyes and turned blind/blindness and kills him.seen on footage bat attack on movie nightwing (film)

Raghu is later killed, when he decides to sleep in the factory instead of going to the haveli. Hemant decides to follow the Baba along with Sahila on a hunch. They both chase him to the Veerana. But they are captured and Sahila discovers that her father Sameer Pratap is alive. Hitchcock, in a twist of events, reaches the Veerana and rescues all of them. Sameer goes straight home to his brother with the youngsters. Thakur is thrilled to see his brother hale and hearty. Sahila and Hemant relate the story of Baba's plots and Sameer informs his brother of the plan that helped the Baba make the witch's evil spirit possess Jasmin.

Baba plans to kill Jasmin to revive the witch, and starts a ritual. But the family manages to reach the scene. Jasmine is saved by her father, who makes the witch leave her body by destroying the bottle with her doll, but sacrifices his own life. As the witch gets her spirit back in her own body, they succeed in locking the witch inside the sarcophagus, while Baba is killed. The Thakur family and the villagers take the sarcophagus to the temple, and both of the girls are sent out. The witch comes out of the sarcophagus and finds herself in front of the holy Lord. She tries to run away but falls to the ground, burns away and is destroyed. The surviving Thakurs and Hemant begin their life anew.

== Cast ==
- Jasmin Dhunna as Jasmin M. Pratap/witch
- Hemant Birje as Hemant, Sahila's boyfriend
- Sahila Chadha as Sahila S. Pratap
- Kulbhushan Kharbanda as Thakur Mahendra Pratap
- Satish Shah as Hitchcock
- Vijayendra Ghatge as Sameer Pratap
- Gulshan Grover as servant Kalia kasai Raghu
- Rama Vij as Preeti S. Pratap, wife of Sameer Pratap
- Rajesh Vivek as Baba, the wicked sorcerer/tantrik he does black magic with black powers that can makes/transforms into a veerana in innocent lifes peoples ruins the lifes
- Leela Mishra as Sameer's mother-in-law
- Vijay Arora as mechanic and petrol pump worker.
- Narendra Nath as doctor uncle, Psychiatrist
- Tina Ghai as Jasmine's governess
- Rajendra Nath as the Manager of Thakela Guest House
- Bhushan Tiwari as Villager
- Vaishnavi Mahant as Young Jasmine
- Kamal Roy] as the witch Nakita/Nikita, main antagonist/Bat
- K. K. Raj as Police Inspector, investigating the murder of Mechanic and Petrol Pump Owner.

== Production ==
Production on Veerana began in 1985.

== Music ==
Track listing
No.	Title	Singer(s)	Length
1.	"Sathi Tu Kaha Hai"	Suman Kalyanpur
2.	"Sathi Tu Kaha Hai (Sad)"	Suman Kalyanpur
3.	"Dil Ki Dhadkan Kya Kahe, Apne Dil Se Puch Le"	Sharon Prabhakar, Mohammed Aziz
4.	"Sathi Tu Kaha Hai (Version 2)"	Suman Kalyanpur

== Release and reception ==
=== Censorship ===
Veerana was initially rejected by the Central Board of Film Certification due to its mixture of sexual and horror imagery, such as in the seductive portrayal of Jasmine and the "gruesome make-up" used in depicting her transformation into a monstrous witch. The film was re-edited with cuts and released theatrically in May 1988.

=== Critical response ===
In his review of Veerana for Mumbai Sakal, film critic Ashok Rane characterized the Ramsay Brothers as seeking to entertain "through extreme or shocking elements" without any story or underlying themes, and wrote that, "Veerana is that kind of a film by them. But despite having thoroughly combed through this narrow style of storytelling, the director brothers, Tulsi and Shyam Ramsay, seems not to have been moved to look for anything new in this small area they inhabit. They keep using the same formulae of haunted stories, the same tricks for creating fear (a black cat, a beautiful girl on the road asking for a lift, the car losing control). They are not successful with creating fear through these fantastic means, so they end up using crude masks as well and end up failing in their attempt."

Veerana went on to achieve popularity on home video and in subsequent television airings, and is now considered a cult film.

== Home media ==
In 2009, Veerana was released on DVD by Mondo Macabro as a double feature with the 1989 film Purani Haveli (also directed by the Ramsay brothers), as part of the Bollywood Horror Collection Vol. 2. In 2023, Mondo Macabro released Veerana on Blu-ray as part of the Bollywood Horror Collection boxed set, which also includes the Ramsay brothers-directed films Aatma (2006), Bandh Darwaza (1990), Purani Haveli, Purana Mandir (1984), and Tahkhana (1986).

== Proposed remake ==
In 2013, the Ramsay Brothers announced a remake of Veerana in 3D.
