= Sarkari Mehmaan =

- Directed by: N. D. Kothari
- Written by: Navneet
- Produced by: N. D. Kothari
- Starring: Vinod Khanna; Jasmin
- Edited by: I. M. Kunnu
- Music by: Ravindra Jain
- Release date: 12 January 1979
- Country: India
- Language: Hindi

Sarkari Mehmaan is a 1979 Bollywood crime film drama directed by N. D. Kothari. The film stars Vinod Khanna and Jasmin in lead roles.

== Plot ==
Police inspector Anand is very honest, he is known for his honesty, diligence and bravery. He single-handedly captures and arrests notorious smuggler and criminal Jack, who is sentenced to several years of jail. Anand in disguise, also captures gangster Gul Khan, who is also sentenced to a long term in jail. Anand's wife Rekha is not very honest and trustworthy and has an affair with another man named Somesh. There are a lot of fights and arguments between husband and wife and Anand threatens to kill her. He starts following his wife hoping to catch her and Somesh red-handed. Shortly after that, Rekha and Somesh are found dead and Anand is arrested for their murder, though he has not killed them. To prove his innocence and to find the real murderers, he escapes from jail and surprisingly comes back face to face with his foes. Ultimately, he is proved innocent and the real murderer is arrested.

== Cast ==
- Vinod Khanna as Anand
- Jasmin as Bindiya
- Amjad Khan as Gul Khan
- Ranjeet as Jack
- Om Shivpuri as King
- Padma Khanna as Munni Bai
- Jagdeep as Nawab Khan
- Bindu as Rosy
- Vikas Anand as Prosecuting Attorney
- Manju Asrani as Rekha
- Manmohan as Somesh
- Indrani Mukherjee as Anand's Elder Sister
- Shivraj as Bank Manager
- Tun Tun as Bank Employee

== Crew ==
- Director - N. D. Kothari
- Producer - N. D. Kothari
- Music Director - Ravindra Jain
- Lyrics - Hasrat Jaipuri, Naqsh Lyallapuri, Ravindra Jain
- Story - Navneet
- Screenplay - Navneet
- Dialogue - Aziz Quaisi
- Executive Producer - V. N. Kothari
- Editor - I. M. Kunnu
- Production Designer - Krishan Malhotra, Sampat Singh Kothari
- Art Director - V. R. Karekar
- Costumes Designer - Mohamed Umar
- Audiographer - Raj Trehan, Zia Ul Haque
- Choreographer - P. L. Raaj
- Action Director - F. Makrani, Ravi Khanna
- Playback Singer - Asha Bhosle
- Assistant Director - Sushil Kumar
- Hair Stylist - Shekar Ram Patriwal

== Soundtrack ==
Song	Singer
"Lakhnau Chhoota"	Asha Bhosle
"Bombai Shaam Ke Baad"	Asha Bhosle
"Na Julam Ki Maari Hoon"	Asha Bhosle
"Parcha Mohabbat Ka Likh De"	Asha Bhosle
"Sun Sun Re Sarkari Mehmaan"	Asha Bhosle
