= Sazaa (1972 film) =

- Theatrical release poster
- Directed by: Chand
- Written by: Ehsan Rizvi (dialogues)
- Screenplay by: Dhruv Chatterjee
- Produced by: S.K. Kapur
- Starring: Ashok Kumar; Pran; Kabir Bedi; Yogeeta Bali
- Cinematography: B.Gupta
- Edited by: Shyam
- Music by: Sonik Omi
- Production company: Kapur Films
- Release date: 18 May 1972
- Running time: 133 mins
- Country: India
- Language: Hindi

Sazaa (transl. Punishment) is a 1972 Indian Hindi-language action thriller film, produced by S.K. Kapur under the Kapur Films banner and directed by Chand. It stars Ashok Kumar, Pran, Kabir Bedi, Yogeeta Bali while Jeetendra, Rekha have given special appearances and music composed by Sonik Omi.

== Cast ==
- Ashok Kumar as Barrister Raghuveer Sahay / Jagdish Prasad "Jaggu"
- Pran as CBI Inspector Verma / Sohanlal
- Kabir Bedi as Brijmohan
- Yogeeta Bali as Suman Verma
- Madan Puri as Shankar
- Jeetendra as Dancer (Special Appearance)
- Rekha as Courtesan (Special Appearance)
- Helen as Kitty
- Rajendra Nath as Ramu / Ramchandra Gonsalves
- Chandrashekhar as Inspector Sinha
- Mehmood Junior as Ramu's son
- M. B. Shetty as Raka
- Rajan Haksar as Sultan
- Kamaldeep as Pinto
- Faryal as Cabaret Dancer
- Sonia Sahni as Geeta Sahay

== Soundtrack ==
Song	Singer
"Husn Bhi Hai Ek Maikhana"	Asha Bhosle
"O Roop Ki Rani, Dekh Phool Woh Kali Se Lipta Jaye"	Asha Bhosle, Mohammed Rafi
"Beechwale Saiyan Pe Pad Gayi Nazariya"	Asha Bhosle, Mohammed Rafi
"Arey, Naam Mera Hai Banto Jatti, Teri Kya Hai Baat, Yeh Kis Chhaile Ki Himmat Hai Jo Pakde Mera Haath"	Asha Bhosle, Mohammed Rafi, Manna Dey, Minoo Purushottam
"Hum Hain Teen, Tum Ho Char, Kaise Hoga Pyar, Thoda Sa Ruk Jao To Hum Bhi Honge Saath"	Asha Bhosle, Usha Mangeshkar, Minoo Purushottam
