= Anwar (singer) =

Indian Musical artist (born 1949)

Anwar Hussain
- Born: 1 February 1949 (age 77); Bombay, Bombay State, India
- Genre: Playback singing
- Occupation: Singer
- Instrument: Vocalist
- Years active: 1979–present
- Website: anwarsinger.com

Anwar Hussain (born 1 February 1949), known by the mononym Anwar, is an Indian playback singer.

== Early years ==
Anwar was born in Mumbai on 1 February 1949. His father, Ashiq Hussain (Ahmed Ali Khan), was an accomplished sitar and harmonium player and an assistant music director to the musician Ghulam Haider. Anwar is the brother of actress Asha Sachdev, through Ashiq's first marriage to actress Ranjana Sachdev, and the half-brother of actor Arshad Warsi through his second marriage after divorce. The siblings have never lived together and are estranged from each other.

The young Anwar was classically trained by Ustad Abdul Rehman Khan, along with Mahendra Kapoor, the same teacher who was the preceptor of the legendary playback singer Mahendra Kapoor also. Anwar started singing Mohammad Rafi songs at various concerts. It was during one of those musical shows that Anwar was spotted by the music director Kamal Rajasthani, who gave him a chance to sing for his film Mere Gharib Nawaz.

== Singing career ==
Anwar made his debut as playback singer in the film Mere Gharib Nawaaz (1973) and the music director who gave him this break was Kamaal Rajasthani. Rajasthani relates that during the recording sessions of the song "Kasme Hum Apni Jaan Ki" for this film, Mohammed Rafi was so impressed that he described Anwar as the one singer who could take his place after him. Indeed, the rendition of that song shows promise, but the film, flopped very badly at the box office and the songs also did not find traction with the audience.

In 1977, comedian Mehmood and music director Rajesh Roshan hired Anwar to sing for the film Janta Hawaldar. The songs "Teri Aankhon Ki Chahat", and "Humse Ka Bhool Hui", were picturised on famous actor Rajesh Khanna. Both the film and songs were superhit; hence Anwar started getting work and recognition. Here onwards, for several years, Anwar was on a roll. He sang duets alongside playback singers Lata Mangeshkar, Asha Bhosle and Alka Yagnik, under music directors Khayyam, Laxmikant Pyarelal, Kalyanji Anandji, Bappi Lahiri, Anu Malik and Dilip Sen-Sameer Sen. In a career span stretching over thirty years, Anwar sang a variety of songs including filmi songs, classical songs and contemporary ghazals, bhajans, qawwali, and Sufi songs.

The movie Yeh Ishq Nahin Aasaan released on Dec 31, 1984 featured Anwar Hussain as the lead male singer.

== Recent years ==
In an interview given to Hindustan Times in November 2007, he cite the rise of Kumar Sanu after the release of Aashiqui as the reason for his moving to the United States, where he gave music lessons and performed live shows to audiences in San Francisco and Los Angeles.

In 2004 Anwar composed an album called Meri Aashiqui Se Pehle broadcast on popular RKB show of Sahara Channel. All the songs in the album were mesmerising so much so that one would sense the magic of Mohammad Rafi and appreciate Anwar's talent.

In 2007 he admitted being in construction business. He stated that he was expecting the release of his latest album Tohfa.

He is not in good terms with his half brother Arshad Warsi and half sister Asha Sachdeva. He was reported by the Mumbai Mirror to be living on a very meager income obtained by singing in a night bar.

Thanks to a 20 November 2010 interview published in the Mumbai Mirror, Anwar got a few offers to sing for few TV shows like Rishton Ke Bhanwar Mein Uljhi Niyati.

== Notable songs ==
Film songs

- "Humse Ka Bhool Huyi, Jo Yeh Sajaa Hum Ka Mili" (film: Janta Hawaldar (1979); starring Rajesh Khanna)
- "Teri Aankhon Ki Chahat Mein, To Main Sab Kuch Bhula Doonga" (film: Janta Hawaldar (1979); starring Rajesh Khanna)
- "Ek Akela Man Ka Panchhi" (film: Sardar)
- "Sohni Meri Sohni ... Rab Se Zyaada Tera Naam Leta Hoon" (with Asha Bhosle; film: Sohni Mahiwal, starring Sunny Deol and Poonam Dhillon)
- "Yeh Pyar Tha Ya Kuch Aur Tha" (film: Prem Rog (1982); starring Rishi Kapoor; this particular song he sang with old times singer Sudha Malhotra, and was picturised on Anwar's sister Asha Sachdev.)
- "Nazar Se Phool Chunti Hai" (film: Ahista Ahista)
- "Yun Zeher Zindagi Ka" (film: Salaam e Mohabbat (1983), starring Tabrez and Farida Jalal)
- "Mohabbat Ab Tijarat Ban Gayi Hai" (film: Arpan (1983); starring Jeetendra)
- "Rab Ne Banaya Mujhe Tere Liye" (with Lata Mangeshkar; film: Heer Ranjha (1992); starring Anil Kapoor)
- "Zindagi Imtihan Leti hai" (film: Naseeb (1981); starring Amitabh Bachchan)
- "Haathon Ki Chand Lakeeron Ka" (film: Vidhaata (1982); starring Dilip Kumar)
- "Shair Bana Diya" (film: Yeh Ishq Nahin Aasaan (1984); starring Rishi Kapoor)
- "Mere Khayalon Ki Rehguzar Se" (film: Yeh Ishq Nahin Aasaan (1984); starring Rishi Kapoor)
- "Aisa Bhi Dekho Waqt" (film: Saathi, starring Aditya Pancholi)

Other selected hit songs

- "Chand Se Phool Talak" (film: Jaan-E-Wafa)
- "Yeh Husn Yeh Shabab" (film: Shiv Charan)
- "Mausam Mausam lovely Mausam" (film: Thodisi Bewafaii)
- "Ek Pal Hasna" (film: Bahar Aane Tak)
- "Huzoor Aap Yeh Tohfa" (film: Ghar Ka Sukh
- "Kahan Jateho Ruk Jao" (film: Dulha Bikta Hai)
- "O Saathi Re" (film: Cobra)
- "Maine Zameen Par Chand" (film: Parbat ke Us Paar)
- "Dil Toot Gaya Hai Apna" (film: Anokha Insaan)
- "Ruk Jaa Saathi" (film: Gehri Chot (1983); starring Shashi Kapoor)
- "Uthao Jaam Masti Mein" (film: Beshak)
- "Kisi Soorat" (film: Awara Zindagi)
- "O Jaane Jaana Jaane Bahara" (film: Pratigyabadh)
- "Main Tere Paas Hoon" (film: Do Dishayen)
- "Lagi Re Mehndi" (film: Maqaar)
- "Jab Aaye Aise Pal Kabhi" (film: Yudhpath)
- "Yeh Safar Bhi Kitna Suhana Hai" (film: Sawaal)
- "Ek Taj Mahal Dil Mein" (film: Kasak)
- "Tumhen Jhamgata Aashiqon ka" (film: Padosi Ki Biwi)
- "Hum Unki Aarzoo Mein" (film: Noor E Illahi)
- "Dil Deewanon Ka Dola" (film: Tahalka)
- "Main Faqeer Ishq Mera" (film: Ishq Khuda Hai)
- "Aag Hawa Mitti Aur Paani" (film: Heer Ranjha)
- "Jaa Meri Deeye Ladli" (Punjabi film: Sarpanch)
- "Ek Gal Das Mainu Bottle" (Punjabi film: Sarpanch)
- "Koi Pardesi Aaya Pardes Mein" (film: Hum Hain Lajawab)

Selected classical ghazals

- Bahar Aai Hai Bharde
- Aap Ka Aitbar Kaun Kare
- Tarkh-E-Mohabbat
- Tu Hi Apne Hath Se
- Phool Si Soorat

Selected contemporary ghazals

- Lab Pe Tere Iqraar E Mohabbat
- Yeh Kafas Hi Mujhko Aziz Hai
- Jabse Kareeb Hoke Chale
- Ghadiyan Ginte Din Beete

Contemporary ghazal albums

- Nagma
- Mehboob Mere
- Tohfa
