= A. V. T. Shankardass =

A. V. T. Shankardass is a motion picture financier and producer based in London, England and New Delhi, India.

== Career ==
Shankardass worked in theatre as a director in London and Edinburgh. He then directed the films Praying for Pay, The Commuters and The Stepmother, before becoming involved in film production. He was also a screenwriter with Tomahawk Entertainment and Warner Bros for five years.

Shankardass became C. E. O. and Managing Director of film finance corporation Victory in 1998, handling tax efficient and equity funding, matched with debt structure in various countries. Films financed included K-19 The Widowmaker (Harrison Ford), Femme Fatale (Antonio Banderas), Fly Boys (James Franco), Johnny Was (Vinnie Jones), and Ball & Chain (Kal Penn). In 2000 he managed a takeover of the company, and in 2005 Victory conducted a private stock flotation. At Victory Shankardass negotiated multi-picture deals for artists, including, directors, actors and writers and arranged about US$300 million in motion picture funding. In 2006, he left his management roles, but remained on the board as the largest shareholder.

Shankardass advised officials in Jordan, Dominican Republic, Trinidad and Tobago, Bahamas and Brazil on tax efficient structures for motion picture production and entertainment. He also advised Merrill Lynch in building an entertainment portfolio for the Islamic community, which was Sharia law compliant.

Shankardass has developed and managed entertainment funds in New York, Munich, São Paulo, Brazil and India and Las Vegas, Nevada. Independently as a film producer and financier he has funded about US$200 million in entertainment projects.

Until 2014, he maintained a long-term distribution output deal with Lions Gate Films for North America. He was Managing Partner of Cinema Centro Fund, Brazil and subsequently for Global Entertainment Partners. Recent films include, Captain America: The First Avenger (Chris Evans), Mission: Impossible – Ghost Protocol (Tom Cruise) and Man of Steel (Henry Cavill). He is the CEO of Victory Media, an AIF Alternative Investment under SEBI Securities and Exchange Board of India recent titles are 'Chuskit' (2018) and 'Chippa' (2019).

Shankardass is an Ambassador of Peace for the Harvey Ball Foundation and Spokesperson for the Society of Social Responsibility for His Holiness the Dalai Lama.
