= Salaam Memsaab =

- Directed by: Asrani
- Produced by: V. D. Kalra
- Starring: Asrani; Zarina Wahab
- Music by: R. D. Burman
- Release date: 12 January 1979
- Running time: 131 minutes
- Country: India
- Language: Hindi

Salaam Memsaab is a 1979 Hindi-language comedy drama film directed by Asrani.

== Story ==
Radha (Zarina Wahab) and Sunder (Asrani) and a child (Master Jeetu) are street singers who earn their living singing and dancing on streets, especially in the posh area near the Taj Mahal Intercontinental Hotel opposite of the Gateway of India in Bombay, India. Radha is pretty much down to earth and is content with living this life, working hard. But Sunder has big dreams of becoming rich, wealthy, and famous - quickly. Sunder's dreams do come true, albeit temporarily, when he wins an all-paid week's stay at a five star hotel, and comes in contact with the rich, the wealthy, and the famous.

== Cast ==
- Asrani as Sunder
- Zarina Wahab as Radha
- Sunil Dutt (Guest appearance)
- Rishi Kapoor (Guest appearance)
- Yogeeta Bali as Sunita Sarit
- Ranjeet as Gopal
- Rehman as Mr. Mehra
- Leela Mishra as Mausiji
- Keshto Mukherjee as James
- Tom Alter as John
- Dalip Tahil as Arab Smuggler
- C.S. Dubey
- Arvind Rathod

== Soundtrack ==
The music of the film was composed by R. D. Burman and lyrics were penned by Majrooh Sultanpuri.

Song	Singer
"Jaanewale Sunta Ja"	Kishore Kumar
"Hum Bhi Raahon Mein Khade Hain Yaar, Idhar Dekh Lo"	Kishore Kumar, Lata Mangeshkar
"Na Sharab Se Kabhi Vaasta, Na Tha Silsila Koi Jaam Se"	Bhupinder Singh, Mohammed Rafi
"Tera Kaha Maine Kiya"	Asha Bhosle
"Tum Bhi Meri Jaan"	Asha Bhosle
"Hum Bhi Rahon Mein Khade Hain (Male)"	Kishore Kumar
