= Chor Sipahee =

- Promotional Poster
- Directed by: Prayag Raj
- Produced by: Shyamsunder Shivdasani
- Starring: Shashi Kapoor; Vinod Khanna; Parveen Babi; Shabana Azmi; Asrani
- Music by: Laxmikant–Pyarelal
- Release date: 1977
- Country: India
- Language: Hindi

Chor Sipahee is a 1977 Indian Hindi-language drama film directed by Prayag Raj. Shashi Kapoor, Vinod Khanna, Shabana Azmi and Parveen Babi played the lead roles in the film.

== Plot ==
Reformist Bombay Police Inspector Shankar Kumar seeks to combat crime by encouraging criminals to reform and change their ways. He attempts to rehabilitate Raja Khanna, alias Raja Dada, but fails. After becoming acquainted with Raja's family, which consists of his unmarried sister, Bharti, and his elderly, ailing mother, Shankar becomes determined to help him.

Before he can find a solution, Raja is arrested for the murder of Bichoo, a police informer. Shankar destroys the evidence linking Raja to the crime, costing him his job and resulting in criminal charges and a prison sentence. Upon his release, Shankar has abandoned his former ideals and is prepared to become Raja's criminal partner.

However, Raja has since risen beyond petty crime and joined international smuggling gangs. He is therefore reluctant to accept Shankar into his organisation. Shankar must now prove himself worthy of joining Raja's gang.

== Cast ==
- Shashi Kapoor as Inspector Shankar Kumar / Bada Sahib
- Vinod Khanna as Raja Khanna / Raja Dada
- Parveen Babi as Bharti Khanna
- Shabana Azmi as Priya
- Durga Khote as Mrs. Khanna (Raja & Bharati's mother)
- Krishan Dhawan as Priya's father
- Asrani as Doctor
- Aruna Irani as Meena
- Kader Khan as Munshilal (BMC Worker)
- Ranjeet as Shaikh Jamal
- Om Shivpuri as Police Commissioner
- Mac Mohan as Bichoo
- Shakti Kapoor as Teja
- Narendra Nath as Inspector Apte
- Leena Das as Jamal's wife

== Soundtrack ==
Song	Singer
"Mujhse Mera Naam Na Poochho"	Kishore Kumar
"Mujhse Mera Naam Na Poochho" (Sad)	Kishore Kumar
"Chor Sipahee Mein Hoti Nahin Dosti"	Kishore Kumar, Mohammed Rafi
"Ek Taraf Hai Yeh Zamana, Ek Taraf Hai Dil Deewana"	Asha Bhosle, Mohammed Rafi, Manna Dey, Bhupinder Singh
"Dekha Sahab Kehna Aasan, Karna Kitna Mushkil Hai"	Asha Bhosle
