= Haiwan =

Haiwan (lit. 'animal' or 'beast') or Haiwaan may refer to:

- Haiwan (film), a 1977 Indian Hindi-language musical film
- Haiwan (TV series), a 2018 Pakistani drama serial
- Haiwaan: The Monster, a 2019 Indian television series
- Haiwaan, a 2026 Indian Hindi-language thriller film
