= Apne Apne =

1987 film

- Theatrical release poster
- Directed by: Ramesh Behl
- Written by: Aziz Qaisi; Gulshan Bawra (lyrics)
- Produced by: Ramesh Behl
- Starring: Jeetendra; Rekha; Hema Malini
- Cinematography: Peter Pereira
- Edited by: Sunder Shetty
- Music by: R. D. Burman
- Production company: Rose Movies
- Release date: 13 March 1987
- Running time: 128 mins
- Country: India
- Language: Hindi

Apne Apne (transl. Our Own) is a 1987 Hindi-language drama film produced and directed by Ramesh Behl under the Rose Movies banner. It stars Jeetendra, Rekha and Hema Malini who has credited as special appearance but she has almost same length of screen time as Rekha. Music composed by R. D. Burman.

== Plot ==
Ravi Kapoor (Jeetendra) is a multinational companies who lives with his mothers (Sushma Seth) and runs a contract business. His mother wants him to marry the foreign-returned Seema (Hema Malini) who also becomes from another wealthy family. But Ravi fall in love with Sharda. Ravi introduction and her to his mother. Seema soon finds about it all she is enraged to know that Sharda has come back into their live. She rushes to Shanti Dham to get son back. Samrat attacks the ashram at the same time, in the ensures fight, Sharda sacrifice her to life protection Vijay.

== Cast ==
- Jeetendra as Ravi Kapoor
- Rekha as Sharda Kapoor
- Hema Malini as Seema Kapoor (Extended Special appearance)
- Karan Shah as Vijay Kapoor
- Mandakini as Ila
- Satish Shah as Dheeraj
- Kader Khan as Samrat
- Sushma Seth as Mrs. Kapoor
- Beena Banerjee as Tara
- Dan Dhanoa as Sudhir

== Soundtrack ==
The song "Apne Apne Se" was one of the best song of the year also it is one of top ten duet song of Lata Mangeshkar and Suresh Wadkar.

Song	Singer
"Apne Apne Se"	Lata Mangeshkar, Suresh Wadkar
"Gyan Dhan Hi"	Lata Mangeshkar
"Jo Socha Bhi"	Asha Bhosle
"Idhar Bhi Tu"	Asha Bhosle, Amit Kumar
"Teri Yaad Mein"	Asha Bhosle, Amit Kumar
"Tune Kiya Kya"	R. D. Burman
