= Mera Yaar Mera Dushman =

- Directed by: Anil Ganguly
- Produced by: Askari Jafari
- Starring: Rakesh Roshan; Mithun Chakraborty; Bindiya Goswami; Zarina Wahab
- Edited by: Mukhtar Ahmed
- Music by: Bappi Lahiri
- Release date: 22 May 1987
- Country: India
- Language: Hindi

Mera Yaar Mera Dushman (transl. My Friend, My Enemy) is a 1987 Indian Hindi-language action drama film directed by Anil Ganguly. It stars Rakesh Roshan, Mithun Chakraborty, Bindiya Goswami, Zarina Wahab in lead roles. The film's music was composed by Bappi Lahiri. The film was shot and completed in 1982 but got delayed for unknown reasons.

== Plot ==
Jagmohan & Raj Narayan are both good friends and business partners. Jagmohan's son Ashok wants to become a dancer and his daughter Anita loves a boxer Vinod. Narayan's son Shakti is also a boxer. Shakti and his friend Gopal do illegal works together. Shakti wants to grab Jagmohan's business and his daughter. One day Dinesh is murdered, who is the leader of the labor union. The blame for his murder is imposed on Ashok. He is completely trapped in the trap of Gopal.

== Cast ==
- Rakesh Roshan as Ashok
- Mithun Chakraborty as Vinod Kumar
- Bindiya Goswami as Anita
- Zarina Wahab as Sheela
- Deven Verma as Jamshedji Mukkawala
- Sujit Kumar as Gopal
- A. K. Hangal as Raj Narayan Singh
- Ardhendu Bose as Shakti Singh
- Pinchoo Kapoor as Seth Jagmohan
- Dina Pathak as Mrs. Jagmohan
- Ramesh Deo as Dinesh Kumar
- Seema Deo as Mrs. Dinesh Kumar
- Beena Banerjee as Gopal's Wheel Chair Ridden Wife
- Dinesh Hingoo as Assistant to Mukkawala
- Jankidas as Gopal's Club Manager
- Cezar D'Mello as Catholic priest

== Soundtrack ==
Lyrics: Gulshan Bawra

Song	Singer
"Beoda Pahije Mala"	Kishore Kumar
"Karwat Badal Badal"	Kishore Kumar
"Kabhi Khulke Mile, Kabhi Milke Khule, Chahe Jale"	Kishore Kumar, Asha Bhosle
"Kuch Ladke, Kuch Ladkiya, Bandh Karke Darwaza Aur Kholke Dil Ki Khidkiyan"	Mahendra Kapoor, Shailendra Singh, Manhar Udhas
"Hansee Loot Gayi"	Asha Bhosle
