= Suhaag (1994 film) =

1994 Indian film by Kuku Kohli

- Theatrical release poster
- Directed by: Kuku Kohli
- Written by: Honey Irani; Tanveer Khan
- Produced by: Balraj Irani; Anil Sharma
- Starring: Ajay Devgn; Akshay Kumar; Karisma Kapoor; Nagma; Aruna Irani
- Cinematography: Sameer Arya
- Edited by: Kuldip K. Mehan
- Music by: Anand–Milind
- Distributed by: Shweta International
- Release date: 4 November 1994
- Running time: 162 minutes
- Country: India
- Language: Hindi
- Budget: ₹3 crore
- Box office: ₹12.14 crore

Suhaag (transl. Living husband of a married women) is a 1994 Indian Hindi-language action film directed by Kuku Kohli starring Ajay Devgn, Akshay Kumar, Karisma Kapoor and Nagma in lead roles. Suhaag was one of the highest-grossing Bollywood films of 1994 and was the first film where Devgn and Kumar shared screen space. The duo went on to appear in Khakee (2004), Insan (2005) and in Rohit Shetty's Cop Universe in Sooryavanshi (2021) and Singham Again (2024).

== Plot ==
The story is about Ajay Malhotra and Raj Sinha, two best friends studying in the same college. Pooja and Madhu are their respective girlfriends. Raj is from a rich family and lives with his uncle as his father lives in another town. Ajay lives in Bombay with his widowed mother Asha. Raj treats Ajay's mother as his own and young men have a brotherly relationship. After graduating from college, Raj's maternal uncle asks Ajay for his birth certificate so that he can make his passport and find work for him in Canada. Ajay goes home to look for it and finds out that his full name is Ajay Malhotra and his father, Dr. Ravi Malhotra, is still alive, serving a life sentence in prison for trafficking a patient's organs. Ajay questions his mother and discovers that his father was framed by the hospital owner, Rai Bahadur. Upon discovering the truth, Raj and Ajay go to confront Rai Bahadur & save his father. During their investigation, it is revealed that Raj's father Dr. Sanjay Sinha, is a key member of Rai Bahadur's hospital & was involved in framing Ajay's father years earlier. Rai Bahadur retaliates by killing Raj's father before he could go to court. Raj and Ajay bring the corpse of Dr. Sanjay Sinha in the courtroom, pretending that he is still alive and will give his statement for the oragan trafficking case. They make the court believe that Dr. Sanjay Sinha is pointing the finger at Rai Bahadur. An angry Rai Bahadur tries to shoot at him in court, following which Ajay and Raj fight with him and throw him off the building where he dies.

== Cast ==
- Ajay Devgan as Ajay R. Sharma/Malhotra
- Akshay Kumar as Raj Sinha
- Karishma Kapoor as Pooja
- Nagma as Madhu
- Aruna Irani as Asha R. Sharma
- Dalip Tahil as Dr. Sanjay Sinha
- Suresh Oberoi as Rai Bahadur
- Adi Irani as Dr. Jagdish
- Romesh Sharma as Dr. Ravi Malhotra
- Tiku Talsania as Publisher/Pooja’s father
- Gufi Paintal as Raj's Maternal Uncle
- Jack Gaud as Rai Bahadur's Henchman

== Box office ==
According to Boxoffice-India, Suhaag grossed ₹12.14 crore and was a hit. It was also the eighth highest grossing Bollywood film of 1994.

== Soundtrack ==
The album was one of the best selling albums of 1994. Lyrics authored by Sameer. The song "Tere Liye Jaanam" is heavily inspired by the song, "Roja Janeman" (Kaadhal Rojave in Tamil), from the critically acclaimed cult classic Roja (1992).

#	Song	Singer
1.	"Gore Gore Mukhde"	Udit Narayan, Alka Yagnik
2.	"Tere Liye Jaanam"	S. P. Balasubrahmanyam, K. S. Chithra
3.	"Kagaz Kalam"	Udit Narayan, Alka Yagnik
4.	"Pyar Pyar Pyar Pyar"	Udit Narayan, Bela Sulakhe
5.	"Yeh Nakhra Ladki Ka"	Udit Narayan, Alka Yagnik, Kumar Sanu
6.	"Tana Tana Tana Nana"	Udit Narayan, Sadhana Sargam
7.	"Main Dekhu Tumhein"	Udit Narayan, Alka Yagnik
