= Kohraam =

- Film Poster
- Directed by: Kuku Kohli
- Written by: Kuku Kohli; Dr. Rahi Masoom Reza (dialogues)
- Starring: Dharmendra; Chunky Pandey; Sonam; Sadashiv Amrapurkar; Amrish Puri
- Music by: Bappi Lahiri
- Release date: 18 October 1991
- Running time: 139 minutes
- Country: India
- Language: Hindi
- Budget: ₹23.5 million
- Box office: ₹37.8 million

Kohraam (transl. Lamentation) is a 1991 Indian Hindi-language action-adventure drama film directed by Kuku Kohli. The film stars Dharmendra, Chunky Panday, Sonam, Amrish Puri, Aruna Irani, and Vinod Mehra. The film was released on the Dusshera weekend and was an average grosser in the box office.

== Plot ==
In the village of Rameshpur, Thakur (Sadashiv Amrapurkar) and Kaalia Singh (Amrish Puri) were all powerful with their vicious unjust rule. The whole village used to dance according to their tune. But in that same village an honest and respectable teacher, affectionately called Masterji (Vinod Mehra) on his own singular strength was trying to educate the entire village and improve their living. Thakur could not bear this. So, he made Kalia instrumental and managed to finish the teacher-he was murdered. The teacher's younger brother Arjun (Dharmendra) could not bear this grief of his brother's death. He aimed an axe at Kaalia and wanted to kill him. However, Kaalia escaped and managed to catch Arjun. He was taking Arjun away with him but somehow Arjun luckily escapes from his hands. Masterji's wife Durga (Aruna Irani) vows in front of the Statue of Mother Durga at her temple that she may make her children brave as lions so that one day she may come back to the village and take revenge against Thakur and Kaalia. Time passed by. Arjun aIways was in great grief owing to his separation from his sister-in-law who was just like his mother and her children. After a long time Durga came back to the village with his grown-up children. Munimji's daughter Dhanno (Sonam) falls in love with Vijay (Chunky Pandey), Durga's son. The unjust ways of Thakur went on increasing day by day. Thakur tried to molest the Pujari's daughter but Arjun foils his bid and he kills him. To take the revenge against the death of Thakur, Kaalia comes to the village. Arjun and the entire village face Kaalia, but Kaalia succeeded in imprisoning Durga, Vicky, Vijay and Vishal make a deadly effort to release their mother, Durga. But against such great odds of the dacoits they became helpless and the dacoits caught them and tied them up along with their mother. Dacoit Kaalia does not want to kill them by shooting at them. Instead he plans to give them all a very painful and agonizing death. How Arjun with his two hundred horses reaches Kaalia's den? How he saves them from the frightening den of Kaalia and finishes Kaalia?

== Cast ==
- Dharmendra as Arjun
- Chunky Pandey as Vijay
- Sonam as Dhanno
- Vinod Mehra as Masterji (Arjun's Brother)
- Aruna Irani as Durga (Masterji's Wife)
- Sadashiv Amrapurkar as Thakur
- Amrish Puri as Kaalia Singh
- Mahesh Anand as Laaloo Ustad
- Narendra Nath as Sarju Yadav
- Praveen Kumar as Babbar Sher
- Atlee Brar as Vishal

== Music ==
1. "Adi Tappa Adi Tappa" - Alisha Chinoy, Bappi Lahiri
2. "Chaaku Chhori Phenko Raja PyarKar Lo" - S. Janaki, Shabbir Kumar, Vijay Benedict
3. "Jab Nadiyan Meri" - Asha Bhosle
4. "Lachko Jhatko Laga" - S. Janaki, Mohammad Aziz, Shailendra Singh
5. "Zappi Paale" - Anuradha Paudwal, Bappi Lahiri

== Reception ==
Subhash K. Jha reviewed the film for The Indian Express.
