= Cezar D'Mello =

Indian playwright and theatre director (born 1956)

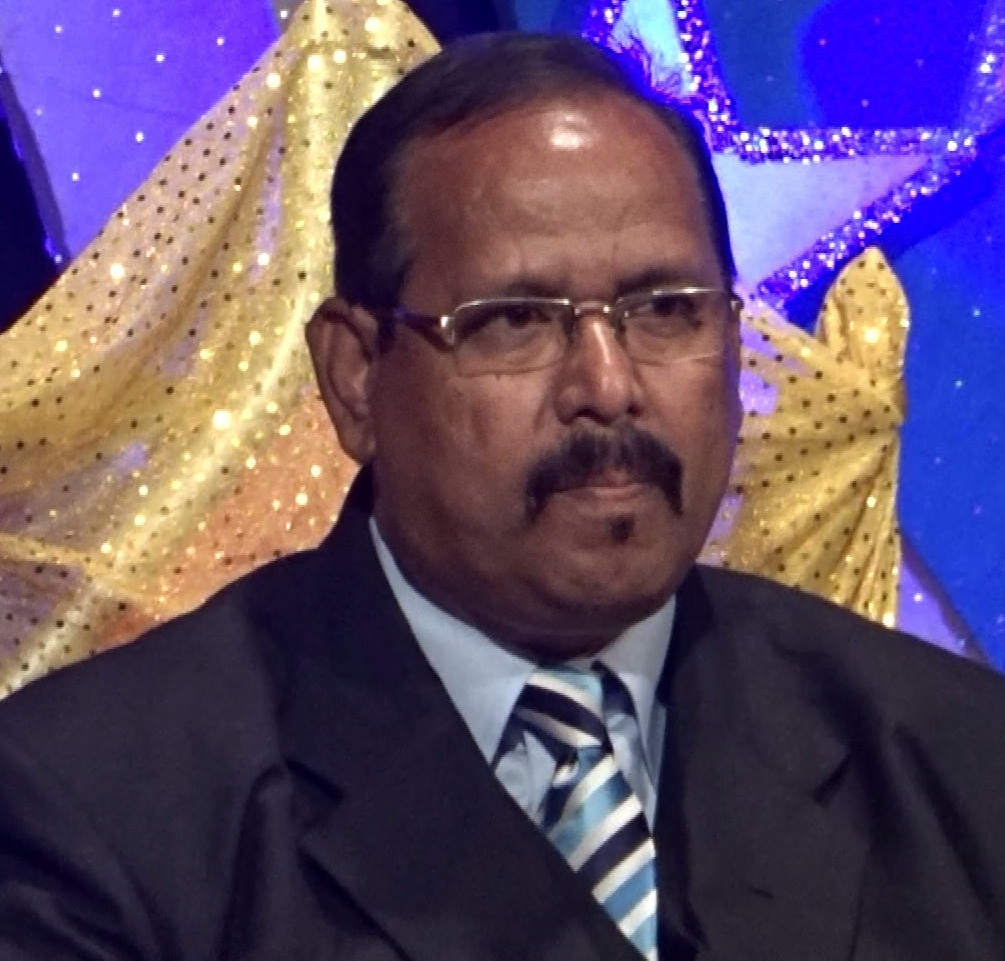
- De Melo at Institute Menezes Braganza, 2017
- Born: Cezar Aleixo Jose Fernandes de Melo; 12 April 1956 (age 70); Pangim, Goa, Portuguese India, Portuguese Empire
- Occupations: Playwright; director; actor; singer; dancer
- Years active: 1970s–present
- Known for: Playing as King Momo during the 2011 Goa Carnival and the 2014 Lusofonia Games
- Notable work: Pukar (1983); Mera Yaar Mera Dushman (1987)
- Spouse: Lydia Roncon (m. 1986)
- Children: 2
- Awards: TAG's "Lifetime Contribution to Tiatr Award" (2017)
- Website: facebook.com/cezar.dmello

Cezar Aleixo Jose Fernandes de Melo (born 12 April 1956), better known as Cezar D'Mello, is an Indian playwright, theatre director, actor, singer, dancer, and former amateur footballer known for his work in Hindi, Konkani films, television, tiatr productions, and folk plays.

== Early life ==
Cezar Aleixo Jose Fernandes de Melo was born on 12 April 1956 in Pangim, Goa, which was part of Portuguese India during the Portuguese Empire. He was the son of João Luis Leão Sebastião de Melo, a postal employee and registered male nurse. De Melo's early exposure to tiatr, a traditional Goan musical theater form, began at the age of nine. He regularly attended performances featuring popular tiatr actors from Bombay alongside his father at various sites in Panjim, including Azad Maidan and Patto. De Melo's fascination with the art form led him to transcribe the scripts of these performances, a practice that ultimately contributed to his development as a playwright.

De Melo's father, João, was a known figure in the tiatr world, known for his singing (kantaram) and violin playing in village performances. The family's involvement extended beyond João's individual performances, as de Melo and his father frequently participated in tiatr productions staged by local priests for a range of celebratory events. Young de Melo's theatrical talents were nurtured within this environment, with him performing alongside his father and sister Pia. He also displayed a talent for writing, composing biblical theatrical performances, which he showcased in the square of the Our Lady of the Immaculate Conception Church in Panjim during the festive Christmas period. His musical abilities were further honed through the performance of musical works authored by his father. De Melo's artistic interests extended beyond the tiatr sphere. He took an active role in both school and church activities, demonstrating his abilities in traditional dances and religious theatrical performances.

== Career ==
De Melo's theatrical journey commenced with his debut in Nelson Afonso's tiatr Árso (Mirror), marking his entry into professional stage performance. This development culminated in the creation of the musical group Mil-Mel-Nel, which garnered fame in the regions of Goa and Bombay. The trio's collaborations extended to popular directors such as C. Alvares, Robin Vaz, John Claro, Bab Peter, Ophelia Cabral, Betty Ferns, M. Boyer, Fr. Planton Faria, Mike Mehta, Valente Mascarenhas, Mario Menezes, Maxie Pereira, Menino De Bandar, etc. De Melo's directorial debut occurred in 1974–75, aged 20, when he directed Bernard D'Silva's Eksurem Jivit (Lonely Life) at Kala Academy's annual tiatr competition. During the years 1976–77, he produced and directed his debut original tiatr, titled Konn Kirmidor (Who is the Murderer?). This production received acclaim, winning the first award at the same competition.

In the mid-1980s, de Melo initiated the formation of the Çezar Dramatic Troupe. This theatrical group became known for its performances and achievements in state-level tiatr competitions hosted by the Kala Academy, earning several awards. De Melo's contributions to the tiatr genre are marked by a series of acclaimed productions. He achieved first prize for several works, including Konn Kirmidor?, Kal ani Aiz from 1982 to 1983, Kalliz Ostorechem from 1983 to 1984, and Kednanch Ghoddchenam from 1985 to 1986. He also achieved recognition with second-place wins for Kitem! Tum Mhozo? (1978–79), Konn Zai? (1979–80), Konnuch Noko (1982–83), and Kaide Konnak? (1984–85). His third-prize winning productions include Kirmidoracho Rosto (1980–81), Kaliz Naslolo (1986–87), and Kolakar (1988–89). De Melo's directorial work extends beyond these award-winning productions to include Visvasi vo Ghatki, Konknni Machie Fattlean, and Kallo Fator. He has also made contributions to the realm of radio theatre, producing and showcasing musical theatrical performances for All India Radio (AIR). These include Kalljivont Nazia, Khoro Mog, Konknni Machier Oxem Ghoddta, Abgath, Soddvondar, Fattim Pavlo, Adhar, Asro, Kor Kazar, Kolakar, Kallo Dhondo, and Kelelea Mapan Gheta.

De Melo's contributions to the Goan theatre scene are diverse, spanning one-act plays, musical productions, and Konkani dramas. His repertoire of one-act plays consists of: Azilo Mhojem Bhirad and Akrek Sudorlo, while his Konkani drama Bhurgim ani Doth was featured as part of the annual drama competition organized by Kala Academy. His productions exhibit a unique pattern in their titles, often commencing with the letter "K." This practice is rooted in a personal belief in the letter's auspiciousness, stemming from the success of his first tiatr, Konn Kirmidor, which secured first prize. Despite this, his subsequent tiatr, known as Visvasi vo Ghatki, did not attain any recognition or awards, leading him to adopt the "K" convention for his tiatr titles, a strategy that appears to have contributed to his success in the genre. Beyond his theatrical work, de Melo has also participated in cultural events abroad. In 1987, he contributed to the Goan Elnish Festival in Dubai by performing as both a dancer and musician with the folklore ensemble led by Timoteo. He has engaged in several cultural events arranged by the Indian Cultural Club located in both Dubai and Sharjah.

De Melo has participated in over 50 tiatr productions, showcasing his talent in both acting and singing. His artistic endeavors extend beyond live performances, as evidenced by his recorded works: a video album titled Vazouia Kumpasar (Play to the Rhythm) and the audio albums, Obsoeg vo Abgath and Goa's Rumblé. The former, Obsoeg vo Abgath is a musical play that addressed the sensitive issue of AIDS. De Melo's career encompasses both artistic and public service roles. He held positions in the Goan government, serving in the Education Department from 1981 to 1985 and subsequently in the Sports and Youth Affairs Department from 1986. His involvement with the cultural sector continued as the department evolved into the independent Art and Culture Department, where he retired as an assistant cultural officer in 2016. De Melo's expertise in tiatr, one-act plays, and folk plays has been recognized through his appointment as a judge in several competitions hosted by the Kala Academy and Tiatr Academy of Goa.

De Melo, known for his work with his Çezar Dramatic Troupe, has authored several tiatr books, including Kal ani Aiz, Kolakar, Kalliz Ostorechem, Kallo Fator, Kaide Konnank, and Kirmidoracho Rosto. His work has also extended beyond the stage, in April 2017, his tiatr named Kallo Dhondo was scheduled for publication. This production would encompass a screenplay titled Khell Jivitacho as well as a non-stop performance tiatr known as Kor Kazar. De Melo's artistic endeavors have also taken him into the realm of Hindi television and film, where he has participated in supporting roles. He assumed the character of a Catholic priest in the television series Mera Yaar Mera Dushman and took part in a dance performance featuring Amitabh Bachchan and Randhir Kapoor in the film Pukar. Beyond his artistic pursuits, De Melo has also held the symbolic role of King Momo during the Goa Carnival in 2011 and represented the same character in the carnival float for the 2014 Lusofonia Games. He is also known for his passion for football, having played for clubs like Panjim Gymkhana, Young Challengers, Alto Guimaraes, and MICPA.

== Personal life ==
As of April 2017, Lydia is a legal professional practicing at the Bombay High Court. Before her marriage, she played a collaborative role in her husband's tiatrs, a form of traditional theater characteristic of Goan culture. She later relocated to Chimbel, Goa, her mother's hometown. Together, the couple had two children: a son, Kevin, a Konkani actor and theatre arts educator, and a daughter, Karen, a television presenter. As of 2018, de Melo resides in Panjim, Goa.
