= Kamal Roy (actress) =

Indian actress

Kamal Roy is a Bollywood actress who acted in over 60 films in the 70s. Her final performance was in Teenmoti (1995) as the main villain.

Kamal started out as a junior artist in 1970 and appeared in a series of small roles. Her breakthrough came with her performance in Bobby (1973) as one of the friends of the hero. After that she had supporting roles in other films with the Kapoor brothers like Manoranjan (1974), Ponga Pandit (1975) and Aap Beati (1976). She was also frequently seen in the bed of villains like Madan Puri in numerous films. One of her biggest roles came when she played Devi Maa Lakshmi in Bhagwan Samaye Sansar Mein (1976). She subsequently left the movie industry and the last of her 70s films was released in 1978.

Except for the delayed release film The Gold Medal in 1984, Veerana was her only film in the 80s.
