= Yeh Vaada Raha (film) =

- Directed by: Kapil Kapoor
- Produced by: Ramesh Behl
- Starring: Rishi Kapoor; Poonam Dhillon; Tina Munim; Shammi Kapoor; Rakhee Gulzar; Rakesh Bedi; Iftekhar
- Music by: R. D. Burman
- Production company: Rose Movies
- Release date: 9 April 1982
- Country: India
- Language: Hindi

Yeh Vaada Raha is a 1982 Indian Hindi-language romance film directed by Kapil Kapoor, starring Rishi Kapoor, Poonam Dhillon, Tina Munim, Rakhee Gulzar and Shammi Kapoor. Inspired by Danielle Steel's The Promise, this was the first Hindi movie where the lead female character is portrayed by two actresses (Poonam Dhillon and Tina Munim) through the use of plastic surgery. Jaya Bhaduri provided the voice for both actresses.

== Plot ==
Vikram Rai Bahadur, the only son of the wealthy Mrs Sharda, falls in love with singer Sunita Sikkan while holidaying in Srinagar. At the temple where they first meet, they vow never to part.

Sharda opposes the marriage, believing her family’s business will suffer if Vikram marries the penniless Sunita. The couple decide on a quiet temple wedding, but on the way they are involved in a car crash. Vikram suffers a brain injury and falls into a coma, while Sunita survives but is badly disfigured. Sharda convinces Sunita that Vikram could never love her in her condition, and tells Vikram that Sunita died in the crash.

Sunita is taken to a hospital in Delhi, where Dr Mehra performs plastic surgery on her and treats her like a daughter. Though no longer disfigured, she looks completely different. When she later visits Vikram’s home, she discovers he is engaged to a woman named Rita. Vikram does not recognise her, leaving Sunita heartbroken. She adopts the name Kusum Mehra and tries to start a new life.

Meanwhile, Vikram is raising money for an orphanage in Sunita’s memory in Srinagar by performing on stage. Kusum and Dr Mehra attend one of his shows, unaware that Vikram is the singer. Angered by his songs about love, Kusum responds in song, and her voice reminds Vikram of Sunita. After a tense encounter and another near-accident, Kusum accidentally reveals details of the original crash, making Vikram suspicious.

Dr Mehra later tells Sharda that Kusum and Sunita are the same person, and urges her to reunite the lovers, but she refuses. During another performance, Kusum recreates Sunita’s mannerisms while singing "Yeh Vaada Raha", triggering Vikram’s memories. Realising she is Sunita, he calls out to her, but she runs away to Jammu and Kashmir.

After confronting Dr Mehra and learning the truth from his mother, Vikram travels to Kashmir in search of Sunita. He finds her at the temple where they first exchanged vows, and the two reconcile and renew their promises to each other.

== Cast ==
- Shammi Kapoor as Dr. Mehra
- Raakhee Gulzar as Sharda Rai Bahadur
- Rishi Kapoor as Vikram Rai Bahadur
- Poonam Dhillon as Sunita Sikkan
- Tina Munim as Kusum Mehra / Sunita Sikkan (after plastic surgery)
- Sarika as Rita Saxena
- Rakesh Bedi as Gogi
- Gulshan Bawra as Sunita's uncle
- Iftekhar as Dr. Sahni
- Hari Shivdasani as Pannalal Saxena
- Sunder as Constable
- Jaya Bachchan as Sunita Sikkan (voice)

== Soundtrack ==
The music for the film's soundtrack was composed by R. D. Burman and the lyrics for the songs were written by Gulshan Bawra.

Song	Singer
"Aisa Kabhi Hua Nahin"	Kishore Kumar
"Tu Tu Hai Wahi, Dil Ne Jise Apna Kaha"	Kishore Kumar, Asha Bhosle
"Ishq Mera Bandagi Hai, Ishq Meri Zindagi Hai"	Kishore Kumar, Asha Bhosle
"Maine Tujhe Kabhi Kuch Kaha Tha, Jo Bhi Kaha, Woh Kiya"	Kishore Kumar, Asha Bhosle
"Jeene Ko To Jeete Hain Sabhi, Pyar Bina Kaisi Zindagi"	Kishore Kumar, Asha Bhosle
"Mil Gayi Aaj Do Lehren"	Asha Bhosle

== See also ==
- Dil Ne Jise Apna Kahaa, a 2004 Indian film, titled after a song from this film
