= Haqeeqat (1995 film) =

1995 Indian film by Kuku Kohli

- Poster
- Directed by: Kuku Kohli
- Written by: Tanveer Khan (dialogues)
- Screenplay by: Rajeev Kaul; Praful Parekh
- Story by: Rajeev Kaul; Praful Parekh
- Produced by: N.R. Pachisia
- Starring: Ajay Devgan; Tabu
- Cinematography: Nirmal Jani
- Edited by: Kuldip K. Mehan
- Music by: Dilip Sen-Sameer Sen
- Production companies: Tips Industries, Ratan International
- Release date: 29 December 1995 (India)
- Country: India
- Language: Hindi

Haqeeqat (transl. Reality) is a 1995 Indian action film directed by Kuku Kohli and produced by N.R. Pachisia. It stars Ajay Devgn and Tabu in pivotal roles. The film was a hit and became the 11th highest-grossing movie of the year at the box office.

== Plot ==
Shiva is a hitman working for a gangster Anna. One day Anna receives a contract from Bhajan Singh, a corrupt politician, to kill the Chief Minister of the state. Anna puts Shiva on the job. Shiva manages to shoot the CM but the CM doesn't die. While escaping from the scene, Shiva inadvertently kills a man. This incident disturbs Shiva who tells Anna to compensate the dead man's family with money. On Anna's instructions, Shiva escapes to Mumbai under the alias Ajay. While on the train, Ajay meets a kind hearted man called Shivcharan and saves his family from being attacked by assassins. Shivcharan then reveals that he is a policeman and hence it must have been some enemy trying to get revenge.

In Mumbai, Ajay starts living with a landlady, Mrs. David, who starts doting on him like her own son. One day, Ajay saves a woman, Sudha, from some hooligans and falls in love with her. The hooligans' ringleader is the brother of a dreaded don Jagpati Bhavani Singh who has Ajay arrested and tries to harass him. However, Shivcharan intervenes and lets Ajay go. One day, Shivcharan, who has incriminating evidence against Bhavani decides to approach the CM regarding this but is attacked and hospitalized. In the hospital, Bhavani's assistant tries to kill Shivcharan by planting a bomb in the ward, but Ajay finds out and saves Shivharan, killing Bhavani's assistant in the process. Bhavani is furious and vows vengeance.

Meanwhile, Ajay and Sudha develop feelings for each other but Sudha is hesitant to move forward since she is a widow and her family won't be very happy if she remarries. Ajay tells her that he loves her come what may and these things don't matter to him and promptly marries her against the protests of her sister-in-law in the presence of the colony's residents. Shivcharan and Mrs. David give their blessings to the couple and Sudha's sister-in-law also relents. The couple start their lives anew leaving their respective pasts behind and begin living happily as a married couple.

Soon, Shivcharan finds out about Ajay's past but decides against arresting him when he sees Ajay saving two small children from an accident. Ajay opens a garage and during the inauguration, Shivcharan burns all the evidence against Ajay in the latter's presence saying that it would be a sin to persecute a man who has already reformed for good. Ajay and Sudha's lives are going on smoothly until one day Anna visits Ajay at his house telling him to come back. Ajay refuses saying he has had great difficulty in washing all the blood off his hands and doesn't want to go back into the cesspool of crime. An infuriated Anna then reveals to Ajay that the man he had accidentally killed was Sudha's first husband. Sudha overhears this conversation and is devastated and tears away from Ajay. Soon it is revealed that she is pregnant with Ajay's child. Anna and Bhajan Singh, who have now joined hands with Bhavani once again try to convince Ajay but he refuses.

Anna has Sudha's brother attacked and Ajay participates in a fighting competition to provide money for his treatment. Ajay wins the money but Sudha harshly rejects him reminding him of his past deeds. Mrs. David and Sudha's sister-in-law try to convince her to reconcile with Ajay saying that he has reformed and loves her truly. However, before she can do anything the three ladies are attacked, and Sudha is kidnapped. Anna, Bhavani, and Bhajan Singh compel Ajay to obey them in exchange for Sudha's life. Ajay seemingly kills the CM and escapes as a helpless Shivcharan looks on.

However, this is revealed to be a ploy when during a condolence meeting for the CM, the CM reveals himself to be alive. Bhajan Singh makes a last ditch attempt to kill the CM but is killed by Ajay. Anna and Bhavani escape to the roof of the building and are cornered by Ajay and Shivcharan. Ajay kills them both and surrenders himself to Shivcharan, who promises to get his sentence reduced. Sudha and Ajay reconcile.

== Cast ==
- Ajay Devgan as Shiva/Ajay
- Tabu as Sudha Malhotra
- Amrish Puri as ACP. Shivcharan
- Aruna Irani as Mrs. David
- Rami Reddy as Anna
- Johnny Lever as Tony
- Himani Shivpuri as Kamini, Sudha's sister-in-law
- Satyendra Kapoor as Chief Minister L.K. Chowdhury
- Anjana Mumtaz as Sumitra – Shivcharan's wife
- Mohan Joshi as Jagpati Bhavani Singh
- Vishwajeet Pradhan as Vivek, Bhawani Singh ka bhai
- Mahesh Gupta as Sudha's first Husband
- Ghanshyam Rohera as Batuklal, Bhavani's henchman
- Ishrat Ali as Bhajan Singh
- Pratibha Goregaonkar as Gangubai, House Maid Servant

== Soundtrack ==
#	Title	Singer(s)	Lyricist(s)
1	"Le Pappiyan Jhappiyan"	Alka Yagnik, Kumar Sanu	Gulshan Bawra
2	"Ek Ladki Hai"	Alka Yagnik, Udit Narayan	Faaiz Anwar
3	"Dil Ne Dil Se Ikrar Kiya"	Alka Yagnik, Hariharan	Nawab Arzoo
4	"Mele Lage Hue Hain Haseeno Ke"	Alka Yagnik, Kumar Sanu	Rani Malik
5	"O Jaane Jaan"	Alka Yagnik, Kumar Sanu	Gulshan Bawra
6	"Main Tera Dil Mein Saason Mein"	Alka Yagnik, Kumar Sanu	Rani Malik
7	"Akrakam Tuka Ta"	Udit Narayan, Sudesh Bhosale	Maya Govind

== Awards ==
Filmfare Awards

- Nomination, Best Playback Singer (Male) : Hariharan (Dil Ne Dil Se)

Screen Awards

- Won, Best Playback Singer (Male) : Hariharan (Dil Ne Dil Se)
- Won, Best Playback Singer (Female) : Alka Yagnik (Dil Ne Dil Se)
