= Dharam Karam =

- Theatrical Poster
- Directed by: Randhir Kapoor
- Written by: Prayag Raj
- Produced by: Raj Kapoor
- Starring: Raj Kapoor; Randhir Kapoor; Rekha; Dara Singh; Jagdish Raj
- Cinematography: Taru Dutt
- Edited by: Shankar Hurde
- Music by: Rahul Dev Burman
- Distributed by: R.K. Films Ltd. Yash Raj Films
- Release date: December 1, 1975
- Running time: 159 minutes
- Country: India
- Language: Hindi

Dharam Karam is a 1975 Hindi drama film produced by Raj Kapoor and directed by Randhir Kapoor, who also stars as father and son in the film, respectively. The film also stars Rekha, Premnath and Dara Singh. The music is by R.D. Burman and the lyrics by Majrooh Sultanpuri, who received a Filmfare nomination as Best Lyricist for the hit song "Ek Din Bik Jayega." The song is played 4 times during the film, with playback singing by Kishore Kumar, Mukesh and Sushma Shrestha. Of the three of them, only Mukesh received a Filmfare nomination as Best Male Playback Singer for the song. According to some source, the film performed "Average" at the box office. and according to some source it performed "Hit" at BoxOffice.

== Plot ==
Shankar is a hoodlum who lives in a shanty hut with his pregnant wife Kanta, and makes a living as a criminal. He prays to Lord Shiva that if he is blessed with a male child, he will ensure that the child does not take to his path but instead grow up to be a decent and honest human being. His wife does give birth to a baby boy named Ranjit. Meanwhile, Shankar loots the ill-gotten gains of another hoodlum named JK. A furious JK hunts down Shankar in an attempt to abduct his son, but Shankar takes his child and switches him with one belonging to renowned stage artist, Ashok Kumar. However, Kanta passes away. Shankar vows to make Ashok's son Dharam an exact criminal like him. He gets into a scuffle with a man, kills him and gets arrested. He is tried in Court and sentenced to 14 years in jail. Dharam is left in the care of a wrestler, Bhim Singh, and a midwife, Ganga. Dharam is taught to be a hoodlum but wants to become a singer under the tutelage of Ashok, while Ranjit has taken to alcohol, gambling and a life of crime under JK himself. After his release, Shankar finds to his horror that his plan has worked in the opposite way. Angered at Dharam, he beats him up and asks him to be a hoodlum like himself. He also beats up Ranjit and asks him to obey Ashok and follow in his footsteps. However, Ashok finds out about Ranjit's crimes. JK and Ranjit hold Shankar hostage and order Dharam to kill Ashok. Dharam is unable to do so. A fight ensues, wherein Ranjit kills JK on learning Shankar is his real father. Shankar initially tries to save his son and frame Dharam for the murder. However, he admits the entire truth when Ashok becomes mortally wounded while trying to save him from Ranjit's gunshot. In the end, Shankar happily watches as Ashok, Dharam and his girlfriend Basanti successfully perform a stage show, while Ranjit is tried for his crimes.

== Cast ==
- Raj Kapoor as Ashok Kumar/ Bonga Sahab
- Raj Rani as Kanta
- Randhir Kapoor as Dharam
- Rekha as Basanti
- Prem Nath as Shankar Dada
- Dara Singh as Bhim Singh
- Pinchoo Kapoor as JK
- Narendra Nath as Ranjit
- Urmila Bhatt as Ganga
- Alka as Neena
- Master Satyajeet as Young Dharam
- Baby Pinky as Young Basanti
- Master Sailesh as Young Ranjit

== Music ==
Dharam Karam

Soundtrack album by R. D. Burman
- Released: 1975
- Recorded: 1975
- Genre: Soundtrack
- Length: 38:47
- Label: Saregama
- Producer: R. D. Burman

R. D. Burman chronology
Sholay (1975)	Dharam Karam (1975)	Nehle Pe Dehla (1976)

Music was Composed by R. D. Burman and released by Saregama.

All tracks are written by Majrooh Sultanpuri.

Track-List
No.	Title	Singer(s)	Length
1.	"Baat Thi Yaar Ek Bair Ki"	Kishore Kumar	4:37
2.	"Ek Din Bik Jayega Mati Ke Mol" (Happy)	Mukesh	5:39
3.	"Tu Kahan Gayee Thi"	Kishore Kumar, Lata Mangeshkar	5:06
4.	"Tere Humsafar Geet Hain Tere"	Kishore Kumar, Mukesh, Asha Bhosle	9:30
5.	"Na Ho Bas Mein Tere"	Kishore Kumar, Mukesh, Poornima	3:10
6.	"Nachan Nahin Aawat"	Lata Mangeshkar	4:17
7.	"Mukh Pe Jo Chhidka Pani"	Kishore Kumar, Lata Mangeshkar	4:50
8.	"Ek Din Bik Jayega Mati Ke Mol" (Sad)	Mukesh, Poornima	1:38
Total length:			38:47

[Note: There is also a title track sung by both MukEsh & KishOre KumAr with the same lines "Ek Din Bik Jaayega, MATi Ke MOl" which was not included in the audio cassette, but has been uploaded by a few YouTubers.]

https://www.saregama.com/song/ek-din-bik-jayega-mati-ke-mol_20577 (Official audio songs' copyright holder) https://www.youtube.com/watch?v=AeMNTJSBT3Y https://www.youtube.com/watch?v=TiXmL96qrRY https://www.youtube.com/watch?v=Q-D7dULWzWM https://www.youtube.com/watch?v=p0gm6XEGoWA https://www.facebook.com/watch/?v=694235087997654 https://gaana.com/lyrics/ek-din-bik-jayega-mati-ke-mol-1 https://open.spotify.com/track/2GSw8vQywrBFAqnf75WXYj https://raag.fm/ek-din-bik-jayega--mp3-song-fb8p2.html
