= Kasme Vaade =

- Poster
- Directed by: Ramesh Behl
- Written by: Mirza Brothers
- Produced by: Ramesh Behl
- Starring: Amitabh Bachchan; Raakhee; Randhir Kapoor; Neetu Singh; Amjad Khan
- Music by: R. D. Burman
- Release date: 21 April 1978
- Country: India
- Language: Hindi
- Box office: ₹4.7 crores(equivalent to ₹97 crores or US$13.6 million in 2019)

Kasme Vaade (transl. Sworn promises) is a 1978 Hindi-language action drama film produced and directed by Ramesh Behl. The film stars Amitabh Bachchan, Raakhee, Randhir Kapoor, Neetu Singh and Amjad Khan. Randhir Kapoor earned a Filmfare nomination as Best Supporting Actor, the only nomination for the film. Rekha makes a guest appearance as a dancer. The music is by R. D. Burman and the lyrics by Gulshan Bawra. The film was the 4th highest earning bollywood film of 1978 after Muqaddar Ka Sikandar, Trishul and Don. It was declared clean hit by both Film Information and Trade Guide magazine after 8 months of release. It was the first bollywood film to celebrate golden jubilee with debutant director. The film was remade in Telugu as Chesina Basalu (1980) and in Tamil as Dharmathin Thalaivan (1988).

== Plot ==
Suman (Raakhee) and Amit (Amitabh Bachchan) love each other and plan to marry soon. Amit lives with his younger brother, Raju (Randhir Kapoor), and Raju already calls Suman "Bhabhi". Amit is a teacher in a college, but Raju is unemployed and a little bit spoiled by Amit and Suman's pamperings.

Neetu Singh has a small role as Raju's fiancée. Raju gets into bad company, and as a result, lands in trouble. When Amit comes to help Raju, he is killed. Suman dons the garb of a widow and plans not to marry again.

Then one day a look-alike of Amit, named Shankar enters Suman and Raju's life. Guilt-ridden, Raju thinks that he has gotten his brother back, and tries to make amends by hiring Shankar, not knowing that Shankar is a wanted criminal, and is looking for an escape route from the authorities. Suman and Raju's affection eventually wins Shankar over from his past evil ways. Shankar cannot escape his past though. Suman is kidnapped and Shankar forced to help kingpin to smuggle diamonds by using an international car rally championship as cover. With Raju's help, good prevails over evil.

== Cast ==
- Amitabh Bachchan as Professor Amit/Shankar (Double role)
- Raakhee as Suman
- Randhir Kapoor as Raju
- Neetu Singh as Neeta
- Rekha (Guest appearance in song Pyar Ki Rang Se Tu Dil Ko)
- Vijayendra Ghatge as Kundan Ghanshyamdas
- Amjad Khan as Juda
- Sharat Saxena

== Soundtrack ==
All the songs were composed by Rahul Dev Burman and lyrics were penned by Gulshan Bawra. The entire soundtrack is on Polydor now Universal Music Group. The song "Kal Kya Hoga Kisko Pata" is partly based on "Hafanana" by Afric Simone.

Title	Singer(s)	Duration	Raga
"Kasme Vaade Nibhayenge Hum" - I	Kishore Kumar, Lata Mangeshkar	04:45	
"Kasme Vaade Nibhayenge Hum" - II	Kishore Kumar, Lata Mangeshkar	02:04	
"Aati Rahengi Baharen" - I	Kishore Kumar, Amit Kumar, Asha Bhosle	05:14	
"Mile Jo Kadi Kadi"	Kishore Kumar, Asha Bhosle, Mohammed Rafi	05:48	Bhairavi
"Aati Rahengi Baharen" - II	Amit Kumar	02:50	
"Kal Kya Hoga"	R.D.Burman	04:59	
"Pyar Ki Rang Se Tu Dil Ko"	Asha Bhosle, Anand Kumar.C.	08:11	
