= Satte Pe Satta =

1982 film by Raj N. Sippy

- Film poster
- Directed by: Raj N. Sippy
- Written by: Satish Bhatnagar; Kader Khan; Jyoti Swaroop
- Produced by: Romu N. Sippy
- Starring: Amitabh Bachchan; Hema Malini; Amjad Khan; Ranjeeta Kaur; Sachin Pilgaonkar; Sudhir; Shakti Kapoor; Kanwarjit Paintal; Kanwaljit Singh; Vikram Sahu
- Narrated by: Kader Khan
- Cinematography: Anwar Siraj
- Music by: R.D. Burman
- Production company: Rupam Chitra
- Release date: 1982
- Running time: 166 minutes
- Country: India
- Language: Hindi

Satte Pe Satta (transl. Seven on Seven) is a 1982 Indian Hindi-language action comedy film directed by Raj N. Sippy and produced by Romu N. Sippy. The film stars Amitabh Bachchan, Hema Malini, Ranjeeta Kaur and Amjad Khan in the lead roles with Sachin Pilgaonkar, Sudhir Luthria, Shakti Kapoor, Kanwarjit Paintal and Kanwaljit Singh in supporting roles.

The story revolves around seven unsophisticated brothers who all are transformed by Indu (Hema Malini) the wife of the eldest brother Ravi Anand (Amitabh Bachchan). However, things take a turn when Ravi's lookalike Babu is sent to impersonate him and murder Seema Singh (Ranjeeta Kaur), a disabled heiress, by her cunning uncle Ranjit Singh (Amjad Khan). Then Babu falls in love with Seema adding to the complications. The story of the film was adapted from the American film Seven Brides for Seven Brothers (1954), which is based on the short story "The Sobbin' Women" by Stephen Vincent Benét, which was based in turn on the ancient Roman legend of the Rape of the Sabine women.

== Plot ==
Satte Pe Satta is the story of seven brothers - Ravi, Som, Mangal, Budh, Guru, Shukra and Shani - living on a farmhouse among animals. All the six younger brothers have grown up under the leadership of the oldest brother Ravi Anand. Being orphans and uneducated, all of them are unsophisticated bumpkins who lack social etiquette and hygiene. Ravi always defends his youngest brother Shani Anand whenever his other five brothers try to trouble him harmfully. However, they all end up forgiving and uniting with each other. Ravi does not plan to marry until he meets a hospital nurse named Indu through a sequence of incidents. He falls in love with her, although she dislikes him due to his undisciplined behaviour and disgusting look. Along with Shani, Ravi tricks Indu into believing that he is his only one younger brother. He even grooms himself as a proper human and appears before her in his new form. Indu eventually reciprocates Ravi's feelings and the two get married.

After their marriage, Indu is initially happy that only the three of them live in the remote farmhouse, away from loud noise and non-cleanliness, which leaves Ravi frightened. After entering his house, she is shocked to learn that Ravi has five more brothers, all uncivilized and uncouth, but agrees to stay on their request. Shani and the brothers struggle to adjust with a new girl in their lives and so does Indu, who grooms them all too as proper humans and plans to civilize them. Few days later, the brothers meet six sisters at a beach and respectively fall in love with each one, and the feeling is mutual. The sisters are the caretakers of Seema Singh (Ranjeeta Kaur), a wealthy heiress who is unable to walk due to paraplegia. Her uncle Ranjit Singh has devious plans of murdering her in order to gain the possession of her ancestral property. He gets a prisoner Babu Sharma released from jail and hires him to kill Seema.

Meanwhile, Ravi is saddened to see that the brothers are terribly missing their love interests, and are thus unable to concentrate on their work. In order to make them feel better, he unintentionally helps them break into the girls' house and kidnap them all with Seema. Indu is irked with Ravi and the brothers, but agrees to let the girls stay. Soon, Ranjit learns about Seema's visit to the farmhouse and invites Ravi to his house to help him collect some clothes and medicines for Seema.

During their meeting, he is shocked to see that Ravi is an exact doppelganger of Babu. Taking advantage of this, Ranjit sends Babu to impersonate Ravi with an exchange of one lakh rupees in order to have him murder Seema. Ravi is captured and imprisoned at a remote island by Ranjit's henchmen. Undergoing a complete makeover, Babu transforms himself into Ravi whose car and other belongings are obtained by him as well. Babu then goes to live in Ravi's house where he is shocked to learn that Indu is pregnant with Ravi's child. However, he is quickly accepted by Indu and the brothers as no one suspects a thing. Meanwhile, Ranjit makes Ravi suffer a lot at the island and plans to frame him for Seema's murder.

At Ravi's house, Babu grabs an opportunity and is about to murder Seema with his dagger but due to the shock, she regains the control of her legs and is able to walk again. On seeing everyone's happiness, Babu is eventually overcome with guilt and falls in love with Seema. During Karva Chauth, he ends up revealing his true identity and Ranjit's intentions to the family, confessing his crime and subsequent reformation to them. Shanu forgives him as he did not cause any harm to their sister-in-law Indu, who is like a mother to them. Babu then promises Indu that whether he himself lives or not, her husband will surely remain alive.

The next day, Babu takes the brothers to the island and tries to trick Ranjit into releasing Ravi. Ranjit outsmarts him and captures him with all the brothers, beating up Ravi badly and knocking him out. However, the brothers motivate Ravi by repeating their motto to regain consciousness and fight against Ranjit. Ravi eventually succeeds in defeating Ranjit (presumably to death) and is reunited with his brothers. Babu then decides to leave which causes a heartbroken Seema to lose control of her legs again as she had fallen in love with him as well. Using his dagger, Babu makes her stand up from her wheelchair and Ravi reunites with Indu, while the brothers marry their girlfriends. The films ends with all the eight couples happily embracing each other.

== Cast ==
- Amitabh Bachchan in a dual role as
  - Ravi Anand: Indu's husband, the eldest brother
  - Babu: a criminal who is hired to impersonate Ravi
- Hema Malini as Indu Anand, Ravi's wife
- Ranjeeta Kaur as Seema Singh, Babu's love interest
- Amjad Khan as Ranjit Singh, Seema's uncle
- Sachin Pilgaonkar as Shani Anand, Ravi's sixth and youngest brother
- Sudhir as Som Anand, Ravi's first younger brother
- Shakti Kapoor as Mangal Anand, Ravi's second younger brother
- Kanwarjit Paintal as Budh Anand, Ravi's third younger brother
- Kanwaljit Singh as Guru Anand, Ravi's fourth younger brother
- Vikram Sahu as Shukra Anand, Ravi's fifth younger brother
- Aradhana as Aradhana, Som's girlfriend
- Prema Narayan as Prema, Mangal's girlfriend
- Madhu Malhotra as Madhu, Budh's girlfriend
- Asha Sachdev as Asha, Guru's girlfriend
- Shobhini Singh as Preeta, Shukra's girlfriend
- Rajni Sharma as Rajni, Shani's girlfriend
- Kalpana Iyer as Ranjit's girlfriend
- Mac Mohan as Ranjit's henchman
- Goga Kapoor as Rowdy Goon in Bar
- Moolchand as Lala, Grocery Shop Owner
- Vijayendra Ghatge as Shekhar (guest appearance)
- Sarika Thakur as Sheela (guest appearance)
- Manmauji as hospital watchman
- Kader Khan as the narrator (cameo; voice only)

== Music ==
Satte Pe Satta

Soundtrack album by R. D. Burman
- Released: 1982
- Recorded: 1982
- Genre: Soundtrack
- Label: Saregama
- Producer: R. D. Burman

The lyrics of all the songs were written by Gulshan Bawra except 'Dilbar Mere', which was written by Anand Bakshi, and music was composed by Rahul Dev Burman.

Song title	Singers
"Dilbar Mere"	Kishore Kumar, Annette Pinto
"Dukki Pe Dukki Ho"	Kishore Kumar, Asha Bhosle, Bhupinder Singh, Sapan Chakraborty, Rahul Dev Burman
"Jhuka Ke Sar Ko Puchho"	Kishore Kumar, Asha Bhosle, Sapan Chakraborty
"Pariyon Ka Mela Hain"	Kishore Kumar
"Pyar Hamen Kis Mod Pe"	Kishore Kumar, Bhupinder Singh, Rahul Dev Burman, Sapan Chakraborty, Gulshan Bawra
"Zindagi Milke Bitayenge"	Kishore Kumar, Bhupinder Singh, Sapan Chakraborty, Rahul Dev Burman
"Mausam Mastana"	Asha Bhosle, Dilraj Kaur, Annette Pinto, Chorus
"Zindagi Milke Bitayenge (Sad)"	Kishore Kumar
