= Khazana (1987 film) =

- Movie Poster
- Directed by: Harmesh Malhotra
- Written by: Dr.Rahi Masoom Reza (dialogues)
- Screenplay by: Ravi Kapoor
- Story by: Ravi Kapoor
- Produced by: Subhash Kapoor
- Starring: Randhir Kapoor; Rekha
- Narrated by: Amrish Puri
- Cinematography: V. Durgaprasad
- Edited by: Govind Dalwadi
- Music by: Laxmikant–Pyarelal
- Production company: Subhash International
- Release date: 1 January 1987
- Running time: 127 minutes
- Country: India
- Language: Hindi

Khazana (transl. Treasure) is a 1987 Indian Hindi-language action-adventure film, produced by Subhash Kapoor under the Subhash International banner and directed by Harmesh Malhotra. It stars Randhir Kapoor and Rekha, while Jeetendra, Rishi Kapoor have special appearances and music was composed by Laxmikant–Pyarelal. The movie is loosely based on the 1984 Kannada movie Gandu Bherunda which in turn was inspired by the 1969 American film Mackenna's Gold.

== Cast ==
- Randhir Kapoor as Raj Kumar
- Rekha as Anita Mathur
- Bindu as Sonam
- Ranjeet as Ramesh Sinha
- Madan Puri as Jai Singh
- Dev Kumar as Raka
- Mohan Sherry as Usman
- Jeetendra as singer / dancer Ravi Khanna
- Rishi Kapoor as singer / dancer Ramnath Shastri
- Ratan Gaurang as watchman

== Music ==
The music of the film was composed by Laxmikant-Pyarelal and the lyrics were penned by Anand Bakshi.

Song	Singer
"Hum Bhi Musafir, Tum Bhi Musafir"	Mohammed Rafi
"Mehfil Mein Sayanon Ki Ek Deewana Aa Gaya, Deewana Sayanon Ko Deewana Bana Gaya"	Mohammed Rafi, Asha Bhosle, Usha Mangeshkar
"Khazane Ki Chabi Mere Paas Hai"	Asha Bhosle
"Hum Tabiyat Ke Bade Rangeen Hain, Ek Nahin Hum Do Nahin Hum Teen Hain"	Shailendra Singh, Amit Kumar, Anwar
