= Anari No.1 =

Anari No. 1
- poster
- Directed by: Kuku Kohli
- Written by: Kader Khan; Kuku Kohli
- Produced by: Aruna Irani
- Starring: Govinda; Raveena Tandon; Simran
- Cinematography: H. Laxminarayan
- Edited by: Kuldip K. Mehan
- Music by: Dilip Sen-Sameer Sen
- Distributed by: A.K International
- Release date: 9 April 1999
- Running time: 161 minutes
- Country: India
- Language: Hindi

Anari No. 1 is a 1999 Indian Hindi-language comedy film directed by Kuku Kohli. The film stars Govinda, Raveena Tandon and Simran in the lead roles and Aruna Irani, Kader Khan, Satish Shah and Satyendra Kapoor in supporting roles, with songs composed by Dilip Sen and Sameer Sen. It was super hit at box office.

== Plot ==
Naive Raja is employed as a lowly waiter in a hotel. One day he serves and looks after a wealthy businessman K. K., who lends him a suit, and gives him some money, so that he could find a rich woman to woo and marry. Raja thinks Sapna is wealthy and successfully woos her and wins her heart, only to find out that she too is on the lookout for a rich prince charming. She thought Raja was the rich, debonair, and eligible bachelor Rahul Saxena.

With the help of garage owner, Sattarbhai, all three of them concoct a plot to kidnap Rahul Saxena and hold him for ransom, while Raja takes his place. After kidnapping him, Raja does take his place with Rahul's family, his stepmom, Sharda, dad Dhanraj, uncle, aunt, and sweetheart Sona. Sona happens to be the daughter of Raja's mentor K. K., and this arouses anger with K. K. when he finds out that Raja has chosen Sona to seduce. Then things start to go wrong as Raja himself gets kidnapped, as he is mistaken for Rahul.

== Cast ==
- Govinda in Double role, as
  - Rahul Dhanraj Saxena
  - Raja Dhanraj Saxena: Rahul's brother; Poor guy
- Raveena Tandon as Sapna Raja Saxena: Raja's wife
- Simran as Sona Rahul Saxena: Rahul's wife
- Aruna Irani as Sharda Saxena; Dhanraj's wife; Raja and Rahul's mother
- Kader Khan as K.K.
- Adi Irani as Tiger Tadipaar
- Johnny Lever as Galer Mehndi
- Prem Chopra as Chacha Balwant (Rahul's Uncle)
- Himani Shivpuri as Chachi Razia (Rahul's Twins Aunt)
- Satish Shah as Sattarbhai
- Razak Khan as Rajju Tabela (Kidnapper)
- Satyendra Kapoor as Dhanraj Saxena; Sharda's husband; Raja and Rahul's father
- Dinesh Hingoo as Jewellery Shop Owner
- Master Frank Anthony as Bunty

== Soundtrack ==
All lyrics by Dev Kohli.

Anari No.1

Soundtrack album by Dilip Sen-Sameer Sen
- Released: March 1999
- Genre: Feature film soundtrack
- Label: Tips Music

Title	Singer(s)
"A B C D E F G"	Udit Narayan, Kavita Krishnamurthy
"Le Aaya Hoon"	Kumar Sanu, Preeti Uttam
"Dheere Dheere Ham Donon Mieen"	Abhijeet, Alka Yagnik
"Main Laila"	Abhijeet, Jaspinder Narula
"Tujhe Dekh Ke Jaana Jaana"	Sonu Nigam, Alka Yagnik
"Main Hoon Ladki Kunwari"	Abhijeet, Jaspinder Narula
"Pagal Mujhe Bana Gaya Hai"	Abhijeet, Kavita Krishnamurthy
"Bol Hari"	Dilip Sen, Amit Kumar, Pradeep Suri

== Reception ==
Sharmila Taliculam of Rediff.com wrote, "Anari No 1 isn't wonderful, but it's a simple film with no pretensions about it. It seeks to entertain and makes a decent job of it". K. N. Vijiyan of New Straits Times wrote that "See this one if you are a fan of Govinda and his brand of comedy".
