= Pukar (1983 film) =

- Directed by: Ramesh Behl
- Written by: Madan Joshi; G.R. Kamath
- Produced by: Ramesh Behl
- Starring: Amitabh Bachchan; Zeenat Aman; Randhir Kapoor; Tina Munim; Prem Chopra
- Cinematography: Peter Pereira
- Edited by: Nand Kumar
- Music by: R.D. Burman
- Distributed by: Rose Movies
- Release date: 18 November 1983
- Running time: 162 minutes
- Country: India
- Language: Hindi

Pukar (transl. Call) is a 1983 Indian Hindi-language action film, directed by Ramesh Behl, starring Amitabh Bachchan, Randhir Kapoor, Zeenat Aman and Tina Munim. It is a film about freedom fighters trying to liberate Goa from the Portuguese.

== Plot ==
Purandare (Shreeram Lagoo), Narvekar (P. Jairaj), and Dinanath (Sudhir Dalvi) are part of a separatist group fighting to liberate Goa from Portuguese rule. During a shootout with Portuguese police, Purandare and Dinanath are gravely injured. Rather than be captured, Dinanath begs Purandare to end his life. Purandare reluctantly obliges, but their act is witnessed by Dinanath’s young son, Ramdas, who misinterprets the scene and believes Purandare murdered his father.

Frightened and alone, Ramdas flees to the home of Mr. Dayanand (Om Shivpuri), who offers him shelter. However, when the Portuguese police raid the house demanding Ramdas' whereabouts, Dayanand and his wife are seemingly killed. In the next scene, Purandare arrives searching for Ramdas, but the boy, still traumatized, runs away at the mere sight of him. (There’s some confusion here as Dayanand appears to have been killed but later only has minor bruises—perhaps an editing inconsistency.)

To escape his past, Ramdas changes his name to Ronnie and distances himself from the revolutionary cause. After an altercation with local kids, the story fast-forwards two decades, revealing Ronnie as a lean, street-smart career criminal, played by Amitabh Bachchan. He has a glamorous girlfriend, Julie (Zeenat Aman), and works for Hasmok (Sujit Kumar), a fellow outlaw. Ronnie earns the favor of Inspector Monteiro (Prem Chopra) by helping Hasmok evade capture.

Ronnie’s past catches up with him when he crosses paths with Purandare once more. The aging revolutionary and his comrades are in desperate need of ammunition for their fight against the Portuguese. Ronnie, having long abandoned any patriotic cause, betrays them to the police—not once, but twice. In the second betrayal, Purandare is killed.

Enter Shekhar (Randhir Kapoor), a young rebel who quickly becomes a thorn in Ronnie’s side. Shekhar steals Ronnie’s gold, orchestrates the escape of a captured rebel (Viju Khote), assassinates the Portuguese police chief, and is ultimately sentenced to death. His heroism earns him widespread admiration, fueling Ronnie’s resentment. Seeking revenge, Ronnie impulsively decides to kill Shekhar’s parents—only to discover that they were the same people who once sheltered him as a child. This revelation shakes him to his core, forcing him to reconsider his past and understand Purandare’s actions all those years ago.

Determined to make amends, Ronnie vows to save Shekhar from the gallows. In a climactic final battle, Ronnie and Shekhar join forces, leading the charge against the Portuguese. Their fight culminates in victory, bringing an end to the colonial rule they once sought to escape in very different ways.

== Cast ==
- Amitabh Bachchan as Ramdas/Ronnie
- Randhir Kapoor as Shekhar Nagare
- Zeenat Aman as Julie
- Tina Munim as Usha
- Prem Chopra as Montero
- Sudhir Dalvi as Dinanath, Ramdas,s father
- Shriram Lagoo as Purandare
- P. Jairaj as Narvekar
- Om Shivpuri as Dayanand, father of Shekhar Nagare
- Chand Usmani as Saraswati, mother of Shekhar Nagare
- Pinchoo Kapoor as Mr Kamat, father of Usha
- Sudha Chopra as Mrs Kamat, mother of Usha
- Sujit Kumar as Hasmukh
- Satyendra Kapoor as Gopal
- Viju Khote as Kiran Bhandare
- Shubha Khote as Young Julie's Mother
- Narendra Nath as Jaggu
- Sharat Saxena as Pablo
- Radha Bartake as Anjali, Gopal,s daughter
- Shiva Rindani
- Gurbachan Singh as Godfre
- Gautam Sarin as Portuguese Police Officer
- Azaad Irani as Latif
- Cezar D'Mello as unnamed dancer

== Production ==
Scenes of the film were shot in Daman and Diu.

== Soundtrack ==
Music Direction: R. D. Burman, Lyrics: Gulshan Bawra, Audio: Polydor now Universal Music Group

The music for all the songs were composed by Rahul Dev Burman and penned by Gulshan Bawra.

#	Title	Singer(s)	Duration
1	"Jane Jigar Duniya Main"	Kishore Kumar, R. D. Burman	06:13
2	"Bachke Rehna Re Baba"	Kishore Kumar, Asha Bhosle, R. D. Burman	06:25
3	"Samandar Mein Nahake"	R. D. Burman	04:48
4	"Tu Maike Mat Jaiyo"	Amitabh Bachchan, R. D. Burman	06:12
5	"Tu Mere Liye"	Asha Bhosle	04:17
6	"Maarein Ge Ya Mar Jaayenge"	Asha Bhosle, R. D. Burman	05:21
