= Adi Irani =

Indian television actor

- Born: Mumbai, Maharashtra, India
- Occupation: Actor
- Years active: 1978–present
- Children: 2
- Relatives: Indra Kumar (brother); Aruna Irani (sister); Firoz Irani (brother); Kuku Kohli (brother-in-law); Bindu (cousin)

Adi Irani is an Indian actor who has worked in Bollywood films. He also did the role of V. P. Menon in 2013 TV show Pradhanmantri. He is brother of director-producer Indra Kumar and Bollywood actress Aruna Irani. He has also acted in TV serials like Yahaaan Main Ghar Ghar Kheli, Ssshhhh...Phir Koi Hai.

Irani is married and has two children.

== Filmography ==
=== Films ===
- 1978 – Trishna
- 1986 – Baat Ban Jaye
- 1988 - Kasam
- 1988 - Zulm Ko Jala Doonga
- 1989 – Nafrat Ki Aandhi
- 1990 – Dil
- 1991 – Swarg Yahan Narak Yahan
- 1992 – Beta
- 1992 – Parda Hai Parda
- 1993 – Baazigar
- 1993 – Anari
- 1993 – Zakhmo Ka Hisaab
- 1993 - Santaan
- 1994 - Khuddar
- 1995 - Raja
- 1995 - Nishana
- 1998 – Pyaar to hona hi tha
- 1999 – Anari No. 1
- 1999 – Baadshah
- 1999 – Hum apke dil mein rehte hai
- 2002 - Tum Se Achcha Kaun Hai
- 2001 – Chori Chori Chupke Chupke
- 2006 – Pyare Mohan
- 2007 – Welcome
- 2009 - Team: The Force
- 2013 – Wake Up India
- 2013 – Raqt as co-director with Shiva Rindan
- 2015 – Welcome Back
- 2016 – Ek Kahani Julie Ki
- 2022 – A Thursday

=== Television ===
- YUG on DD National as British Police Inspector Manjeet Singh
- Mahabharat Katha as Chandak (1997-98)
- Khauff on Sony SAB as Ajay (Episode 3 & Episode 4)
- Kasautii Zindagii Kay as Siddhant Chaubey
- Jai Santoshi Ma (2001-2002)
- Yahaaan Main Ghar Ghar Kheli
- Pradhanmantri as V. P. Menon
- Ssshhhh...Phir Koi Hai - Episode 88-89: Balighat Ka Bargad as Bankim Daa (2008) Star One
- Ssshhhh...Phir Koi Hai - Episode 108-109: Kumbharakha as Purohit (2008) Star One
- Savitri - Ek Prem Kahani
- Rang Badalti Odhani
- Rakt Sambandh
- Des Mein Niklla Hoga Chand as Mr. Khurana (Anu's father)
- Love Ne Mila Di Jodi as Balraj Saxena
- Hare Kkaanch Ki Choodiyaan
- Tum Bin Jaaoon Kahaan as Harshvardhan Rajsingh
- Zameen Se Aassman Tak
- Kahin Diyaa Jale Kahin Jiyaa
- Naaginn
- Aashiyana
- Urmila
- Saath Rahega Always
- Apne Paraye
- C.I.D.
- Savdhaan India - Kishorilal (Episode No 231) / Ranvijay (Episode No 1293) / Sagar (Episode No 1629)
- Jai Ganesha as Kalanemi (Tarakasur's friend)
- Akoori (web series) in 2018 on ZEE5 Originals
- Lockdown Ki Love Story as Shobhakant Jaiswal (2020-2021)
- Durga – Mata Ki Chhaya as Advocate Batra (2020–2021)
- Jag Janani Maa Vaishno Devi - Kahani Mata Rani Ki as Devendra
- Sasural Simar Ka 2 as Gopichand Oswal (2021) on Colors TV
