= Raampur Ka Lakshman =

- Poster
- Directed by: Manmohan Desai
- Produced by: A.A Nadiadwala
- Starring: Randhir Kapoor; Rekha; Shatrughan Sinha
- Cinematography: Sudhin Majumdar
- Edited by: Kamlakar Karkhanis
- Music by: R.D. Burman
- Distributed by: A.G Films Pvt.Ltd
- Release date: 11 August 1972
- Country: India
- Language: Hindi

Raampur Ka Lakshman is a 1972 Indian Hindi-language romance drama film directed by Manmohan Desai. The film was remade in 1978 in Tamil, titled as Mangudi Minor.

== Synopsis ==
Kedarnath Bhargav, his wife, Laxmi, and two sons, Ram and Lakshman, are homeless. While traveling, their train derails, and the family is separated into three groups. Laxmi works as a maidservant in the house of Bombay's mayor and his daughter, Rekha. Ram is abducted by a career criminal. Kedarnath and Lakshman are together. Ratanlal Verma, a kind-hearted man with a son named Prakash, comes to Lakshman's rescue, is run over by a truck, and is crippled. Kedarnath and Lakshman relocate to Ratanlal's village, Raampur, and they live together as one family.

Years later, Prakash grows up and moves to Mumbai, where he finds employment with a jeweler. When Ratanlal does not hear from him for two months, he asks Lakshman to go to Mumbai and ensure that Prakash is all right. Upon arrival in Bombay, Lakshman finds out that Prakash has been arrested by the police for killing a man named Kundan Kumar. He is subsequently found guilty and sentenced to be hanged. Lakshman takes it upon himself to find out who actually killed Kundan. He dons the disguise of Louis D'Souza and gets himself enrolled in the Serpent Gang. Lakshman does not know that Kumar, the leader of this gang is none other than his brother Ram. When Laxman finds out, he must make a choice & mdash; whether to let innocent Prakash go to the gallows or to turn his own brother in to be hanged until death.

Kumar later discovers that he is Laxman's brother, but is fatally shot in a fight. Before dying, he pens up a confession and asks Laxman to never reveal to their mother that her elder son Ram turned out to be a criminal. In the end, Prakash is released, and Laxman marries Rekha.

== Cast ==
- Randhir Kapoor as Laxman Bhargav
- Rekha as Rekha Chaudhary
- Shatrughan Sinha as Ram Bhargav / Kumar
- Padma Khanna as Julie
- Ranjeet as Peter
- Manmohan Krishan as Kedarnath Bhargav
- Sulochana Latkar as Laxmi Bhargav
- Raj Mehra as Mayor Chaudhary
- Roopesh Kumar as Chhaganlal Pandey
- Ramesh Deo as Prakash Verma
- Randhir as Ratanlal Verma
- Faryal as Cabaret Dancer
- Shyam Kumar as Louis D'Souza
- Viju Khote as Micheal
- Ramayan Tiwari as BB, Ram's Abductor
- Bhushan Tiwari as Bhushan
- Ranvir Raj as Police Inspector Dharmesh

== Music ==
The song "Kaahe Apnon Ke" samples the Romance theme from the Lieutenant Kijé Suite by Russian composer Sergei Prokofiev.

Song	Singer
"Rampur Ka Vasi Hoon"	Kishore Kumar
"Kaahe Apnon Ke" (Solo)	Kishore Kumar
"Kaahe Apnon Ke Kaam Nahin Aaye Tu" (Duet)	Kishore Kumar, Asha Bhosle
"Gum Hai Kisi Ke Pyar Mein Dil Subah Sham"	Kishore Kumar, Lata Mangeshkar
"Pyar Ka Samay Kam Hai Jahan, Ladte Hain Log Kaise Wahan, Kyun Mere Yaar"	Kishore Kumar, Mohammed Rafi, Lata Mangeshkar
"Albela Re Ruk Jana"	Lata Mangeshkar
"Sanwla Rang Hai Mera"	Asha Bhosle
