= Do Ustad (1959 film) =

- Poster
- Directed by: Tara Harish
- Written by: Om Dogra; Ehtram Husain
- Screenplay by: Om Dogra; Tahir Lakhnauwi
- Produced by: Sheikh Mukhtar
- Starring: Raj Kapoor; Madhubala; Sheikh Mukhtar; Sulochana Latkar; Daisy Irani
- Cinematography: G. Vasant
- Edited by: S. K. Prabhakar
- Music by: O. P. Nayyar
- Distributed by: Talwar Films
- Release date: 5 June 1959
- Running time: 142 minutes
- Country: India
- Language: Hindi

Do Ustad (transl. Two masters) is a 1959 Indian Hindi-language crime thriller film, directed by Tara Harish, produced by Sheikh Mukhtar and starring Mukhtar, with Raj Kapoor and Madhubala. One of the earliest Bollywood films to deal with "lost and found" formula, Do Ustad revolves around two brothers separated in their childhood who grow up to become thieves. Moderately received by critics, the film became a commercial success.

== Plot ==
The film begins with a criminal, Jagannath, being convicted in a court offence. He has no lawyer to defend him, so the judge asks him if he has anything to say on his behalf. He refuses to say anything, but his younger brother Rajan asks him to say something, otherwise he would break his vow. Jagannath then starts narrating his story and the film goes into flashback. Jagannath and Rajan are two brothers who have lost their parents and work for Seth for a living. One day, Seth finds an excuse and kicks them out. To make their ends meet, the younger brother decided to become a thief, though the elder brother is a forthright, idealistic man who refuses to follow his brother. One day, a man asks them to get him something out of the railway godown (warehouse), for which he would pay them money. When Rajan goes to the godown, he is caught by the police and the two brothers are separated. The elder brother also decides to enter the world of crime. After this, Jagannath is shown to be a seasoned criminal who has made a fortune by robbing places and he leads a team now. He leads a dual life as his wife is totally unaware of his profession. Jagannath steals a necklace worth ₹12 lakhs (₹1.2 million) and the police want to catch the thief. Rajan is simultaneously released from jail and helps the police to track the thief. The first time the two brothers meet is when Rajan tries to pick the pocket of Jagannath after leaving jail, though the two of them are unaware of each other's identity. Rajan sees a girl, Madhu and tries to impress her, impersonating as Raj Kapoor for a while. Madhu's wicked uncle wants to get hold of all her property and wants to get her married off, knowing which, Madhu runs away from home. She lands at the place where Rajan and Jagannath stay and all want to get hold of her as her uncle has announced a reward for anyone who might bring her home. Rajan gets hold of Madhu and hands her over to tell Jagannath, who pays him Rs. 10000. But she escapes from Jagannath's den and lands up at his house while fleeing. When she tells Jagannath's wife the real identity of her husband, she refuses to believe her, so she hatches a plan instead. She leads herself to Jagannath, without his men having realised who they had taken to their boss. When both Jagannath and his wife meet, they are equally shocked and his wife leaves him and decides to go away. She tries to commit suicide, but is saved by Rajan. Rajan looks after her and becomes a motor mechanic, a changed man. Jagannath's wife who was pregnant, gives birth to a boy. Madhu gets a false impression that Rajan's wife is pregnant and so she decides to see all her with him. She concentrates on her career and becomes a famous dancer. One day, when Madhu is travelling in a car, her uncle chases her in his car and Madhu's car hits Raja, son of Jagannath. Madhu takes Raja away for treatment. When Rajan comes to take Raja back, Madhu learns the truth and their relationship improves. Meanwhile, a party is organised by Jagannath in the honour of a well-to-do person from a place, who is actually Rajan in disguise. The police are there and arrest Jagannath, Rajan and Ramlal Sharma (Madhu's uncle). All of them are released except Jagannath, who is imprisoned. Jagannath is freed from jail as he desperately wants to see his son, but in the process is shot by the police. An injured Jagannath lands up at a place near to where Rajan stays with Jagannath's wife and son. He comes across Raja, who looks after and tends to his injury. They spend some time together and develop a bond. Ramlal Sharma appears there and there is a scuffle between Jagannath and Ramlal in which Ramlal is shot. The police also appear later and chases Jagannath to a tall building under construction, where Jagannath climbs to the top with Raja still in his possession. Rajan tells him that Raja is Jagannath's son and asks him to descend, but in vain. Jagannath only believes Rajan when he sees his wife. Jagannath surrenders to the police and asks Rajan never to tell Raja his father's name. Then one comes to the present scene in the court, where Jagannath is convicted, and before he goes to jail, Rajan asks Raja to call Jagannath, "Baba" (father) once as he has been told that Jagannath is yet to find his son. Jagannath goes to jail and the film ends.

== Cast ==
- Raj Kapoor as Rajan / Raj Kumar "Raju"
- Madhubala as Madhu Sharma
- Sheikh Mukhtar as Jagannath
- Sulochana Latkar as Jagannath's wife
- Daisy Irani as Raja
- Randhir Kapoor as Young Jagannath

== Production ==
Do Ustad was the first Indian film to use the lost and found formula with brothers. Earlier, Kismet (1943) too had such same themes, and Do Ustad took several inspirations from the film.

Do Ustad was produced by Sheikh Mukhtar (who starred in the film also). The filming began in 1957 and ended by early 1959.

== Soundtrack ==
The music of Do Ustad was composed by O. P. Nayyar and lyrics by Qamar Jalalabadi .

Song	Singer
"Aaqa Ka Baaqa"	Mohammed Rafi
"Aaya, Tum Pe Dil Aaya"	Asha Bhosle
"Ruk Ruk, Kahan Chali Deewani, Koi Roke"	Asha Bhosle, Mohammed Rafi
"Nazron Ke Teer Mare Kas Kas Kas"	Asha Bhosle, Mohammed Rafi
"Rik Rik, Tik Tik, Boom Boom Chik"	Asha Bhosle, Mohammed Rafi
"Tere Dil Ka Makaan Saiyan Bada Aalishaan"	Asha Bhosle, Mohammed Rafi
"Tu Ladki Main Ladka, Tujhe Dekh Kaleja Dhadka"	Asha Bhosle, Mohammed Rafi
"Hum Pe Dil Aaya To Bolo Kya Karoge, Humne Tadpaya To Bolo Kya Karoge"	Asha Bhosle, Mohammed Rafi, Shamshad Begum

== Release ==
The film premiered at Novelty Cinema, Bombay, on 26 June 1959.

== Reception ==
=== Critical reception ===
A Times of India review, dated 28 June 1959, carried the headline: "Patent Gags, Popular Music In Sheikh Mukhtar's Do Ustad".

In another contemporary review published in Thought, Uma Vasudeva called the film "a second-grade version of Shree 420". Among the actors, she found Kapoor "repeating his Shree 420 image" and Mukhtar "ill-adjusted in his role", but described Madhubala as "delightful".

=== Box office ===
The Times of India reported in early July 1959 that Do Ustad was popular with audiences. The film became a box office success. It ran in theatres for more than 25 weeks, becoming a silver jubilee hit.

== Influence ==
Do Ustad has been remade two times: in 1966 as Iru Vallavargal and in 1974 as Haath Ki Safai.
