= Jawaani =

- Promotional Poster
- Directed by: Ramesh Behl
- Written by: Humayun Mirza
- Produced by: Rose Movies
- Starring: Sharmila Tagore; Neelam Kothari; Karan Shah; Jatin Malhotra; Navin Nischol; Moushumi Chatterjee; Anupam Kher; Sadashiv Amrapurkar
- Cinematography: Peter Pereira
- Music by: R. D. Burman
- Release date: 1984
- Running time: 135 min.
- Language: Hindi

Jawaani is a 1984 Indian Hindi-language film produced and directed by Ramesh Behl, introducing Neelam Kothari, Karan Shah and Jatin Malhotra with Sharmila Tagore, Moushumi Chatterjee, and Anupam Kher in supporting roles.

== Plot ==
Jawaani is a triangular love story in the midst of strong family bonds that create conflict.

== Soundtrack ==
Song	Singer
"Sajna Main Sada Tere Saath Hoon"	Lata Mangeshkar
"Gali Gali Dhunda Tujhe, Kone Kone Dekha Re"	Lata Mangeshkar, Amit Kumar
"Bheega Bheega, Pyara Mausam, Mehki Si Tanhayi"	Asha Bhosle, Amit Kumar
"Tu Rootha To Main Ro Doongi Sanam"	Asha Bhosle, Amit Kumar
"Maana Abhi Ho Kamsin Aur Nadaan Ho Tum"	Amit Kumar
"Halla Gulla Mazaa Hai Jawaani"	Amit Kumar

== Cast ==
- Neelam Kothari as Sanam Malhotra
- Karan Shah as Karan Nath
- Sharmila Tagore as Sushma Malhotra, Sanam's mother
- Navin Nischol as Amar Nath, Karan's father
- Moushumi Chatterjee as Prema Mohan, Karan's mother
- Anupam Kher as Surendra Malhotra, Sanam's father
- Sadashiv Amrapurkar as Uncle Joe
- Narendra Nath
