= Aruthu =

- Theatrical release poster
- Directed by: Ravi
- Produced by: Som Prakash
- Starring: Kamal Haasan; Sumithra; M. G. Soman
- Cinematography: Moorthi
- Edited by: Ravi
- Music by: G. Devarajan
- Production company: Sun Flower Productions
- Distributed by: Sun Flower Productions
- Release date: 26 March 1976
- Country: India
- Language: Malayalam

Aruthu (transl. Never) is a 1976 Indian Malayalam-language film, directed by Ravi. The film stars Kamal Haasan, Sumithra, M. G. Soman and Kaviyoor Ponnamma in the lead roles. The film has musical score by G. Devarajan. The film was a remake of the Hindi film Khel Khel Mein.

== Cast ==
- Kamal Haasan
- Sumithra
- M. G. Soman
- Kaviyoor Ponnamma
- Sankaradi
- Surasu
- P. A. Thomas

== Production ==
Aruthu film produced by Som Prakash under production banner Sun Flower Productions. This film was shot in black-and-white. It was given an "U" (Unrestricted) certificate by the Central Board of Film Certification. The final length of the film was 3,333.74 metres (10,937.5 ft).

== Soundtrack ==
The music was composed by G. Devarajan and the lyrics were written by Yusufali Kechery.

No.	Song	Singers	Lyrics	Length (m:ss)
1	"Murali Madhu Murali"	P. Madhuri	Yusufali Kechery	
2	"Nimishangal Nimishangal"	K. J. Yesudas	Yusufali Kechery	
