= Mother (1999 film) =

- Lobby card
- Directed by: Saawan Kumar
- Written by: Anwar Khan (dialogues)
- Screenplay by: Ravi Kapoor
- Story by: Saawan Kumar
- Based on: Mamma Mia!
- Produced by: Saawan Kumar
- Starring: Rekha; Jeetendra; Randhir Kapoor; Rakesh Roshan
- Cinematography: Nazir Khan
- Edited by: Suraj Ghosh
- Music by: Dilip Sen-Sameer Sen
- Production company: Saawan Kumar Productions
- Release date: 16 October 1999
- Running time: 142 minutes
- Country: India
- Language: Hindi

Mother is a 1999 Indian comedy film, produced and directed by Saawan Kumar under his Saawan Kumar production banner. Starring Rekha in the title role, along with Jeetendra, Randhir Kapoor, Rakesh Roshan in the pivotal roles and music composed by Dilip Sen-Samir Sen. The film is based on the American film Buona Sera, Mrs. Campbell. This film marked the debut of Sanober Kabir.

== Cast ==
- Rekha as Asha aka Mrs. Britannia
- Jeetendra as Sunil Malik
- Randhir Kapoor as Kumar Sinha
- Rakesh Roshan as Amar Khanna
- Shashikala as Mrs. Chaudhary
- Shubha Khote as Maria
- Asrani as Johny
- Rahat Khan as Raj Chaudhary
- Sanober Kabir as Jiya
- Altaf Raja as himself
- Tirlok Malik
- Mushtaq Khan as Sunder Das
- Dinesh Hingoo as Dhanraj
- Nishigandha Wad as Mrs. Sinha
- Prabha Sinha
- Saadhika Randhawa in special appearance
- Fatima Sheikh

== Soundtrack ==
All songs written by Sameer.

#	Title	Singer(s)
1	"Pardesi To Hai Pardesi" - (I)	Anuradha Paudwal, Sonu Nigam, Roop Kumar Rathod
2	"Mother Mother Dear Mother"	Anuradha Paudwal, Kavita Krishnamurthy
3	"Pardesi To Hai Pardesi" - (Part II)	Udit Narayan
4	"Bivi Hai Chiz Sajaavat"	Altaf Raja
5	"Ek Duni Do Do Duni"	Udit Narayan, Anuradha Paudwal
6	"Chaar Chaar Duni Aath"	Vipin Sachdeva, Sadhana Sargam
7	"Happy Days Are Here Again"	Sapna Mukherjee, Hariharan, Roop Kumar Rathod, Sanjeevani
8	"Pardesi To Hai Pardesi" (female)	Anuradha Paudwal
9	"Jiya I Want To Love You"	Kumar Sanu, Anuradha Paudwal
