= Zulmi =

- DVD cover
- Directed by: Kuku Kohli
- Written by: Rajeev Kaul; Tanveer Khan
- Screenplay by: Rajeev Kaul
- Story by: Kuku Kohli
- Produced by: Satyendra Pal
- Starring: Akshay Kumar; Twinkle Khanna; Amrish Puri; Aruna Irani
- Music by: Dilip Sen-Sameer Sen
- Production company: Chaudhry Enterprises
- Release date: 16 April 1999
- Running time: 151 mins
- Country: India
- Language: Hindi
- Budget: ₹3.5 crore
- Box office: ₹4.93 crore

Zulmi is a 1999 Indian Hindi action drama crime film directed by Kuku Kohli, released on 16 April 1999. It stars Akshay Kumar and Twinkle Khanna.

== Plot ==
Balraj Dutt is a bodyguard of Baba Thakur, who, while dying, makes Balraj promise to take care and protect his grandson Nihal.

Years later, Raj Malhotra and his sister are dining in a restaurant, after which they are attacked by the unknown man. The man tries to rape Raj's sister before she commits suicide.

Heartbroken by this incident, Raj sees a similar incident and saves a girl from molesters. This is observed by Balraj, who is impressed by Raj, who hires Raj as a bodyguard for his daughter Komal. She initially dislikes Raj and tries repeatedly to get him fired, but slowly she starts liking him after he saves her life from an attack. Things get complicated when he recognizes Nihal as the person who molested his sister. Now, Raj tries to kill Nihal.

== Cast ==
- Akshay Kumar as Raj Malhotra
- Twinkle Khanna as Komal Dutt
- Amrish Puri as Balraj Dutt
- Aruna Irani as Sumitra Dutt
- Dalip Tahil as Zoravar
- Deep Dhillon as Bakhtavar
- Arun Bakshi as Inspector Vikram
- Dara Singh as Baba Thakur
- Milind Gunaji as Nihal Thakur
- Rakhee Malhotra as Pooja Malhotra
- Ghanshyam Rohera as Pilot

== Soundtrack ==
Zulmi

Soundtrack album by Dilip Sen-Sameer Sen
- Released: 20 January 1999
- Genre: Feature film soundtrack
- Label: T-Series

The music is composed by Dilip Sen-Sameer Sen, while the lyrics are written by Gulshan Bawra.

- 01 - "Teri Badmashiyan Aur Meri" - Asha Bhosle & Udit Narayan
- 02 - "Bhool Se Humne Bhool Ki" (Happy)- Kumar Sanu & Asha Bhosle
- 03 - "Shalu Ya Sheela" - Amit Kumar
- 04 - "Mere Liye To Fit Hai Tu" - Amit Kumar & Asha Bhosle
- 05 - "Sapne Mein Aake Loot Gaya" - Asha Bhosle *Music by: R. D. Burman
- 06 - "Zulmi Toone Zulm Kiya" - Asha Bhosle
- 07 - "Bhool Se Humne Bhool Ki" (Sad)- Asha Bhosle
- 08 - "Bhool Se Humne Bhool Ki" - Instrumental

== Reception ==
A critic from Deccan Herald wrote that "Hype is generally inversely proportional to quality. This film proves this. No feverish promos. No signs of any pretensions. No jiggery-pokery. The film’s just plain and direct".

Collecting 37 lakh nett on the opening day, and a total of 2.74 crore nett, the film failed at the box office.
