= Khel Khel Mein (1975 film) =

- Poster
- Directed by: Ravi Tandon
- Written by: Sachin Bhowmick
- Produced by: Ravi Malhotra
- Starring: Rishi Kapoor; Neetu Singh; Rakesh Roshan; Aruna Irani
- Cinematography: M.R Vasudev
- Edited by: Waman B Bhosle, Gurudutt Shirali
- Music by: R. D. Burman
- Release date: 16 May 1975
- Country: India
- Language: Hindi

Khel Khel Mein (transl. Within the game) is a 1975 Indian Hindi-language black comedy action thriller film directed by Ravi Tandon. It was an adaption of the French novel Good Children Don't Kill written by Louis Thomas. The film music was composed by R. D. Burman and the lyrics written by Gulshan Bawra. The film stars Rishi Kapoor, Neetu Singh and Rakesh Roshan as college students, who play a prank and get involved with a notorious criminal. The film turns quickly from fun and frolic to a taut thriller. Iftekhar and Aruna Irani also star in the film. The film was remade in Malayalam language as Aruthu (1976), in Hindi again as Khiladi (1992), and in Marathi language as Bindhast (1999).

== Plot ==
Ajay joins a college in Shimla for further education. He meets Vikram and Nisha, two slackers in the college who just love playing pranks. Ajay is way different from them and an easy target. But after some initial hiccups, Ajay becomes friends with them. Soon, the trio are playing pranks on unsuspecting people. One day, they spot a stingy Seth (a wealthy man) and send him a fake typewritten extortion note, hoping to relieve him of his money.

However, the next day, they find out through the newspaper that the man is dead. Based on the circumstances, they realize that they might end up as prime suspects in the case. They decide to destroy their incriminating typewriter, only to find it missing. Also, they realize that a stranger (Dev Kumar) is stalking them. Ajay and Nisha decide to tell police the truth, whether they believe it or not. But even before they can tell the truth, they are horrified to find Vikram dead.

They meet Inspector Rajendra Singh, who is investigating the case. The Inspector is sceptical, but gives them one chance to prove their innocence. From Vikram's personal belongings, they find out about a club singer named Sherie. Anticipating that Sherie may know why Vikram was killed, they go to meet Sherie. But when they go to her dressing room after her performance, they find her dead. The duo realize that Sherie was involved in some shady deals and Vikram was her partner.

After trying to find out some information, they learn that Sherie acted as a middleman between a dreaded criminal named Black Cobra and the people who paid him. After learning that Black Cobra is an extortionist and the dead man was also on his payroll, blocks suddenly start falling into place. Ajay and Nisha deduce that the Seth thought the note was from Black Cobra and confronted him. The Seth thought that Black Cobra became more greedy and threatened to expose him, following which he was killed by latter.

Black Cobra thought that Vikram and Sherie were extorting people in his name, behind his back, so he killed them. He also stole the typewriter to frame Ajay and Nisha. It becomes clear that the person following them is either Black Cobra himself, or his henchman. Though they have no concrete information about Black Cobra, they find some information secretly hidden by Sherie, that might unmask Black Cobra. The stranger confronts them, but the duo overpower him and escape. They inform the Inspector about their findings. The Inspector calls them to meet him in an abandoned place.

Ajay gives him all the incriminating evidence, but to his astonishment, the Inspector burns all of it. He shocks him by telling that he is none other than Black Cobra himself. Suddenly Ajay realizes that he played right into his hands. Black Cobra coolly goes on to declare that since he knows pretty much everything, he has to kill him and pin the blame of all the killings on him. He denies that he sent any man behind them. Just he is about to pull the trigger, the stranger makes an entry and after some fight the Black Cobra is put behind bars.

To a bewildered Ajay and Nisha, the stranger reveals that he is Charlie, an undercover police officer working on the murder cases. He tells that he suspected Vikram and Sherie of running the extortion racket much before the first murder. He already knew about the prank, but was unsure of the killer's identity. So he stole their typewriter. Then Cobra killed Vikram and Sherie to keep his secret intact. Then he knew that Cobra is behind all this and used the duo to track down Cobra. He reassures Ajay and Nisha that even though Black Cobra destroyed all the proof, there is no proof against the duo either. He tells the duo to collect the typewriter from him the next day. The duo oblige, vowing never to play such pranks again.

== Cast ==
- Rishi Kapoor: Ajay Anand
- Rakesh Roshan: Vikram
- Neetu Singh: Nisha
- Satyen Kappu: Lecturer
- Jankidas: Ghanshyam Das, Jewellery Store Owner
- Iftekhar: Inspector Bhupendra Singh / Black Cobra
- Yunus Parvez: Charlie
- Preeti Ganguly: Uma
- Aruna Irani: Sherry
- Kamal Kapoor: Ajay's Father
- Chand Usmani: Ajay's Mother
- Lalita Pawar: Warden D'Costa
- Hari Shivdasani: Vikram's Father
- Moolchand: Murli Manohar
- Jagdish Raj: Police Inspector (uncredited)

== Awards ==
23rd Filmfare Awards:

Nominated

- Best Music Director – R. D. Burman
- Best Female Playback Singer – Asha Bhosle for "Sapna Mera Toot Gaya"

== Soundtrack ==
The music for the film was directed by R. D. Burman. Gulshan Bawra penned the lyrics for the songs. Shailender Singh has sung one song for Rishi Kapoor and Kishore Kumar throughout this film backs the voice of Kapoor. R. D. Burman himself has also sung one song "Sapna Mera Toot Gaya". The theme music used in the film was later used to compose the song "Tere Bina Mein Kuch Bhi Nahin" in the 1983 film Jaane Jaan.

Song	Singer
"Aaye Lo Pyar Ke Din Aaye, Mil Jaane De Apne Saaye"	Kishore Kumar, Asha Bhosle
"Ek Main Aur Ek Tu, Dono Mile Is Tarah"	Kishore Kumar, Asha Bhosle
"Khullam Khulla Pyar Karenge Hum Dono"	Kishore Kumar, Asha Bhosle
"Humne Tumko Dekha"	Shailendra Singh
"Sapna Mera Toot Gaya, Tu Na Raha, Kuch Na Raha"	R. D. Burman, Asha Bhosle
