= Gulshan Kumar Mehta =

Indian songwriter and actor (1937-2009)

Gulshan Bawra
- Born: Gulshan Kumar Mehta; 12 April 1937; Sheikhupura, Punjab, British India (present-day Punjab, Pakistan)
- Died: 7 August 2009 (aged 72); Mumbai, Maharashtra, India
- Occupations: lyricist, actor
- Years active: 1961-1999

Gulshan Kumar Mehta, popularly known by his pen name Gulshan Bawra (literally: "Gulshan The Mad") (12 April 1937 – 7 August 2009), was an Indian songwriter and actor in Hindi cinema. In a career spanning 42 years, he has to his credit about 240 songs, he collaborated with noted music directors like Kalyanji Anandji, Shankar Jaikishan, and R. D. Burman. He composed almost half of the songs in films like Khel Khel Mein (1975), Kasme Vaade (1978) and Satte Pe Satta (1982). Apart from R. D. Burman hits, he is most remembered for his songs like 'Mere Desh Ki Dharti" in Upkaar (1968) and "Yaari Hai Imaan Mera" in Zanjeer (1974), both of which got him the Filmfare Best Lyricist Award. The latter also topped the Binaca Geetmala annual list of 1973. As a character actor, he also appeared in a small number of Hindi films.

== Early life and education ==
Gulshan Kumar Mehta, popularly known as Gulshan Bawra was born 30 km from Lahore in a place called Sheikhupura. His father had a construction business, and his immediate family were Shri Labh Chand Mehta, father of Roop Lal Mehta and Chaman Lal Mehta, incidentally both their families were victims of the partition riots where young Gulshan witnessed his father and his cousins' father killed in Labh Chand Mehta's haveli, in front of their own eyes. His elder sister at Jaipur, brought him and his elder brother up. After his brother got a job, they shifted to Delhi, where he graduated from Delhi University. During college, he began to write poetry.

== Career ==
He wanted to come into films and applied for a job with the Railways. He was posted to Kota, Rajasthan, but when he arrived there, the vacancy was filled. His next call was luckily that for the post of a clerk at Mumbai and he arrived in the city in 1955. Gulshan struggled to get a film break, initially keeping his job on. Kalyanji (of Kalyanji-Anandji), then on his own as Kalyanji Virji Shah, gave him his first opening in Chandrasena (1959) in the song "Main kya jaanu kahan laage yeh saawan matwala re", sung by Lata Mangeshkar.

K-A's first joint film, the Meena Kumari-Balraj Sahni starrer Satta Bazaar later the same year marked his first brush with success with hits like "Tumhein yaad hoga kabhi hum mile the" (Lata-Hemant), "Aakde ka dhanda" (Rafi) and "Chandi ke chand tukdon ke liye" (Hemant Kumar). It was during the making of this film that the film's distributor Shantibhai Patel christened him "Bawra".

Almost half of his songs have been with R.D.Burman. His last release was Zulmi (1999) and his last hit was "Le pappiyaan jhappiyaan paale hum" for Haqeeqat (1995), which landed him in his only controversy - of writing a vulgar song. His films in the '90s include, besides Haqeeqat and Zulmi, Qurbani Rang Jaayegi, Tehkiqaat, Laat Saab, Maidan-E-Jung, Indrajeet and Chor Pe Mor.

He died on 7 August 2009 at age 72 at his Pali Hill residence in Mumbai.

== Filmography ==
=== As actor ===
- Naukar Biwi Da (1960) as a side Hero name Amar in black & white Punjabi Movie delayed several years finally released on 1976
- Jija Ji (1961) Punjabi movie
- Ek Din Ka Badshah (1964)
- Upkar (1967)
- Parivar (1967)
- Vishwas (1969)
- Pavitra Paapi (1970)
- Pyar Ki Kahani (1971)
- Jaane-Anjaane (1971)
- Jangal Mein Mangal (1972)
- Shehzada (1972)
- Zanjeer (1973).. acted in song "Deewane Hain Diwanon Ko Na"
- Lafange (1975)
- Jai Mata Di (1977) Punjabi Movie
- Agar... If (1977)
- Aap Ke Deewane (1980)
- Agreement (1980)
- Yeh Vaada Raha (1982)
- Agar Tum Na Hote (1983)
- Boxer (1984)
- Biwi Ho To Aisi (1988)
- Indrajeet (1991)
- Basera
- Shrikant
- English Babu Desi Mem (1996)

=== As lyricist ===
- Chandrasena (1959)
- Satta Bazaar (1959)
- Delhi Junction (1960) lyricist name (as Gulshan)
- Purnima (1965)
- Upkar (1967)
- Zanjeer (1973)
- Haath Ki Safai (1974)
- Trimurti (1974)
- Khel Khel Mein (1975)
- Khalifa (1976)
- Vishwasghaat (1976)
- Kasme Vaade (1978)
- Bhala Manus (1979)
- Jhoota Kahin Ka (1979)
- Satte Pe Satta (1982)
- Sanam Teri Kasam (1982)
- Yeh Vaada Raha (1982)
- Agar Tum Na Hote (1983)
- Awaaz (1984)
- Haqeeqat (1995)
- Rafoo chakkar (1975)

== Noted lyrics ==
Song	Movie
"Chand ko kya maloom chahta hai "	Lal Bangla
"Chaandi ki deewar na todi"	Vishwas
"Mere desh ki dharti"	Upkar
"Yaari hai imaan mera"	Zanjeer
"Sanam teri kasam"	Sanam Teri Kasam
"Agar tum na hote"	Agar Tum Na Hote
"Tu tu hai wohi"	Yeh Vaada Raha
"Aati Rahengi Baharen"	Kasme Vaade
"Kasme Vaade Nibhayenge Hum"	Kasme Vaade
"Jivan ke har mod pe mil jayenge humsafar"	Jhoota Kahin Ka
"Teri Badmashiyan"	Zulmi
"Waada karle saajana"	Haath Ki Safai
"Peenewalon ko peene ka bahana chahiye"	Haath Ki Safai
"Le pappiyaan jhappiyaan paale hum"	Haqeeqat
"Pyar Hamen Kis Mod Pe"	Satte Pe Satta
"Dilbar Mere Kabtak Mujhe"	Satte Pe Satta
"Tumhe Yaad Hoga"	Satta Bazar
"Ye Mausam Ye Rangeen Samaa"	Modern Girl
"Har Khushi Ho Wahan"	Upkar
"Diwaane hai diwaano ko na"	Zanjeer
"Banaa ke kiyun bigaada re"	Zanjeer
"Tu kya jane wafa"	Haath Ki Safai
"Sapna mera toot gaya"	Khel Khel Mein
"Ek Main aur Ek Tu"	Khel Khel Mein
"Jeevan me jab aise pal"	Harjaee
"Jaane jaan o meri"	Sanam Teri Kasam
"Bach ke rehna re baba"	Pukar
"Tu maike mat jaiyo"	Pukar
"Tere bina Main kuchh bhi nahin hoon"	Jaane Jaan

== Awards ==
Year	Award	Song	Movie
1968	Filmfare Award for Best Lyricist	Mere Desh Ki Dharti	Upkar
1974	Filmfare Award for Best Lyricist	Yaari Hai Imaan Mera	Zanjeer
