= Randhir Kapoor =

Indian actor (born 1947)

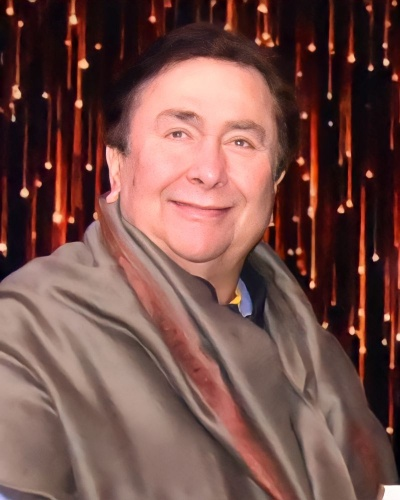
- Kapoor in 2021
- Born: Randhir Raj Kapoor; 15 February 1947 (age 79); Bombay, British India
- Occupations: Actor; producer; director
- Years active: 1955–2016
- Spouse: Babita Shivdasani (m. 1971)
- Children: Karisma Kapoor; Kareena Kapoor
- Father: Raj Kapoor
- Family: Kapoor family

Randhir Raj Kapoor (born 15 February 1947) is a retired Indian actor, film producer and director who worked in Hindi cinema.

Part of the Kapoor family, he is the son of actor–filmmaker Raj, grandson of actor Prithviraj and the brother of actors Rishi Kapoor and Rajiv Kapoor. After working as a child artist in Shree 420 (1955), Kapoor made his acting and direction debut with a leading role in the family drama Kal Aaj Aur Kal (1971), a moderate success at the box office. Subsequently, Kapoor's starring roles in the dramas Jeet (1972), Hamrahi (1974) and the romantic comedies Jawani Diwani (1972), Lafange (1975), Ponga Pandit (1975) and the multi-starrers such as Raampur Ka Lakshman (1972) and Haath Ki Safai (1974). His career failed to propel forward after 1985, following which he quit acting for over a decade. However, the Kapoor-directed successful romantic drama Henna in 1991, earned him a Filmfare Award for Best Director nomination.

Randhir is married to actress Babita since 1971, with whom he has two daughters, actresses Karisma and Kareena Kapoor. The couple separated in 1988, but reconciled in 2007, after living separately for several years.

== Early years and background ==
Kapoor was born on 15 February 1947 in Karunakaran Maternity home, Matunga, Bombay, British India to Punjabi Hindu parents. His family moved from their Kapoor Haveli in Peshawar (now in Pakistan) to Mumbai, before the partition of India, for acting careers. His family originally belonged to Samundri in Punjab. He belongs to the famous Kapoor family who have been part of the Hindi film industry since the late 1920s. He is the eldest son of actor and filmmaker Raj Kapoor and his wife Krishna Kapoor. He has two brothers Rajiv and Rishi, and two sisters, Rima Jain and Ritu Nanda. He is one of the grandsons of actor and producer Prithviraj Kapoor, and grandnephew of the actor Trilok Kapoor. His paternal uncles, Shammi and Shashi Kapoor were both actors. Also, his maternal uncles, Prem Nath, Rajendra Nath and Narendra Nath and were all involved in Hindi cinema. Actor Prem Krishen is his maternal cousins, while actors Aditya Raj Kapoor, Karan Kapoor, Sanjana Kapoor and Kunal Kapoor are his paternal cousins. Actor Prem Chopra is his uncle-by-marriage (Krishna's sister Uma's husband). Actor Ranbir Kapoor is his nephew.

== Career ==
Kapoor first appeared as a child artist in Shree 420 (1955) and Do Ustad (1959). He became an assistant director with the film Jhuk Gaya Aasman (1968), starring Rajendra Kumar in 1968. Randhir Kapoor made his acting and directorial debut with Kal Aaj Aur Kal (1971), which also starred his wife, father, and grandfather. The film, produced under the R.K banner, was an average success.

After his debut, he acted in three consecutive hit films, all released in 1972: Jeet, Raampur Ka Lakshman and Jawani Diwani. Jawani Diwani was one of the biggest hits of that year. Raampur Ka Lakshman costarred Shatrughan Sinha and Rekha, and was directed by Manmohan Desai, with music by R.D. Burman. Randhir and Babita were paired together in Jeet, after their marriage. Jeet was remake of the Tamil film En Annan starring M. G. Ramachandran and Jayalalithaa in the lead roles. After the success of Jeet, Randhir decided to do a remake of another film of MGR. Then MGR's hit 1971 film Rickshawkaran was remade in Hindi in 1973 as Rickshawala with Randhir as the hero opposite the new heroine Neetu Singh, by director K. Shankar, but the film flopped though its music was popular. In 1974 he had 2 big hits – Hamrahi and the two-hero film Haath Ki Safai.

In 1975, he directed and starred alongside his father again in the critically acclaimed Dharam Karam, which was a box office disappointment. Over the years this film has developed a cult status and is considered a classic. Two of his other films, Lafange and Ponga Pandit, were hits that year. From 1976 to 1981, his multi-star films such as Chacha Bhatija (1977), Kasme Vaade (1978), (the latter of which earned him a Filmfare Award for Best Supporting Actor nomination), Mama Bhanja, Heeralal Pannalal, Dhyanu Bhagat also known as Bhakti Mein Shakti and Biwi-O-Biwi: The Fun-Film, were hits too. After the failure of the 1981 Harjaee, he got few offers to star or co-star in films. His film Nikkamma, begun in 1976, and finally released in 1983 as Janejaan, was also a dud. The song composed by R.D. Burman, and sung by Kishore Kumar and Asha Bhosle – "Tere Bina Mein Kuch Bhi Nahin Hoon" from the delayed film Janejaan was popular in 1983. He starred in Sawaal and Pukar in 1983, and received critical praise for his performances, but they flopped nonetheless. In the same year, Humse Na Jeeta Koi received average collections. His last film as a leading actor was Khazana in 1987, after which he did not appear in a film for a decade.

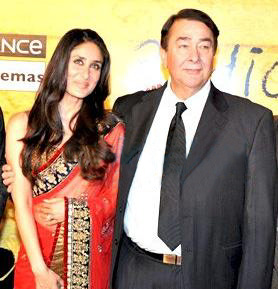
Kapoor with his daughter Kareena Kapoor at the premiere of her film 3 Idiots in 2009

In 1991, he directed and produced the blockbuster Henna (1991), that starred his younger brother, Rishi Kapoor, and Pakistani actress Zeba Bakhtiar. The film had started production in 1988 with his father Raj Kapoor directing, but after his death, Randhir took over as director of the film after his death. Henna resulted in a trip to Pakistan, where he was treated royally by then-prime minister Nawaz Sharif, a fan of his father Raj and his uncles Shammi and Shashi. He was nominated for the Filmfare Award for Best Director. The film was chosen as the Indian submissions for the Academy Award. In 1996, he produced PremGranth, the directorial debut of his younger brother Rajiv, and in 1999 he produced Aa Ab Laut Chalen, the directorial debut of his brother Rishi, which had Rajesh Khanna, Aishwarya Rai and Akshaye Khanna in the lead roles.

He was set to return to acting after a gap of 10 years with the 1997 film Ladies Only. This film was produced by Kamal Hasan and was a remake of Magalir Mattum. The film also starred Shilpa Shirodkar, Seema Biswas, Heera Rajagopal and Kamal Haasan. Although completed, the film was never released. In 1999, he made his comeback in the film Mother, alongside Rekha, Jeetendra and Rakesh Roshan. After another break, he appeared in the film Armaan (2003), in a supporting role as Preity Zinta's father. On 13 May 2007, he made an appearance on the television chat show Koffee with Karan alongside his brothers, sister Rima and his sister-in-law Neetu Singh. On the show, it was mentioned how Randhir had been Neetu's first leading man in the film Rickshawala (1973), which was not a success.

In 2010, he returned to films with supporting roles in Housefull and Action Replayy. In 2012, he appeared in the multi-starrer Housefull 2, the first film in which he acted along with his brother Rishi. He went onto appear in his penultimate film Ramaiya Vastavaiya in 2013 and final film Super Nani in 2014.

== Personal life ==
Kapoor married actress Babita, the daughter of actor Hari Shivdasani, on 6 November 1971 when he was 24 after co-starring with her in Kal Aaj Aur Kal, as the couple fell in love during the shooting of this film. Their two daughters, Karisma Kapoor, born in June 1974, and Kareena Kapoor, born in September 1980, are Indian film actresses. The couple separated in 1988 as differences arose between the couple as Randhir's acting career slumped after 1983 and Babita wanted their daughter Karisma to be an actress. Babita left Randhir with her daughters. Although against his daughters becoming involved in acting, he eventually came around the idea and has been supportive of their careers. The two reconciled in October 2007, having never divorced but lived separately for 19 years. Actor Saif Ali Khan is his son-in-law through his daughter Kareena.

In March 2022, Kapoor's nephew Ranbir Kapoor revealed that Randhir has dementia.

== Filmography ==
=== Actor ===
Year	Film	Role	Notes
1955	Shree 420	Himself	Child Artist
1959	Do Ustad	Young Jagannath	Child Artist
1964	Sangam	Young Sundar	Child Artist
1971	Kal Aaj Aur Kal	Rajesh Kapoor	Debut Film Role
1972	Jawani Diwani	Vijay Anand	
1972	Raampur Ka Lakshman	Lakshman Bhargav	
1972	Jeet	Ratan / Ramu	
1973	Rickshawala	Gopi	
1974	Hamrahi	Ramesh	
1974	Haath Ki Safai	Raju	
1974	Dil Diwana	Vijay	
1975	Ponga Pandit	Bhagwat Prasad Pandey / Prem	
1975	Lafange	Gopal	
1975	Dafaa 302	Mohan / Shankar	Double Role
1975	Dharam Karam	Dharam	
1976	Khalifa	Rajendra / Vinod	Double Role
1976	Ginny Aur Johnny	Dabbu	
1976	Aaj Ka Mahaatma	Randhir / Ranveer	Double Role
1976	Bhanwar	Anup / Balveer Singh	
1976	Mazdoor Zindabaad	Randhir	
1977	Kachcha Chor	Shyam	
1977	Chacha Bhatija	Sundar	
1977	Mama Bhanja	Mohan Lal	
1977	Ram Bharose	Ram Pratap	
1978	Kasme Vaade	Ravi Verma	
1978	Heeralaal Pannalaal	Pannalaal	
1978	Chor Ke Ghar Chor	Birju	
1978	Aakhri Daku	Bhola	
1978	Bhakti Mein Shakti	Damo's Husband	
1979	Bhala Maanus	Anand	
1979	Dhongee	Anand	
1981	Biwi-O-Biwi	Chandramohan "Chandar"	
1981	Harjaee	Ajay	
1982	Zamaane Ko Dikhana Hai	Ramesh Nanda	Guest Appearance
1982	Sawaal	Vikram Mehta "Vicky"	
1983	Humse Na Jeeta Koi	Kishan Singh	
1983	Jaane Jaan	Raju	
1983	Pukar	Shekhar	
1987	Khazana	Rajkumar	
1999	Mother	Kumar Sinha	
2003	Armaan	Gulshan Kapoor	
2010	Housefull	Kishore Samtani	
2010	Action Replayy	Professor Anthony Gonsalves	
2010	Dulha Mil Gaya	Surajratan Dhanraj	
2011	Society Kaam Se Gayi		
2012	Housefull 2	Dabboo Kapoor	
2013	Ramaiya Vastavaiya	Siddhant Kapoor	
2014	Super Nani	R.K. Bhatia	Final film role
2021	Desi Magic	Ashok Saxena	Unreleased film
2022	Naam Tha Kanhaiyalal	Himself	Documentary

=== Producer ===
- Ram Teri Ganga Maili (1985)
- Henna (1991)
- Prem Granth (1996)
- Aa Ab Laut Chalen (1999)

=== Director ===
- Kal Aaj Aur Kal (1971)
- Dharam Karam (1975)
- Henna (1991)
