= Ramesh Behl =

Indian film director and producer

- Born: India
- Died: 5 January 1990; Mumbai, Maharashtra, India
- Occupations: Director; Producer
- Years active: 1978–1987
- Spouse: Madhu Behl
- Children: 4; including Goldie
- Relatives: Kamal Kapoor (father-in-law); Rajendra Kumar (brother-in-law); Sameer Arya (son-in-law); Ravi Behl (nephew)
- Family: Behl family

Ramesh Behl was an Indian film director and producer belonging to Behl family of Hindi films. He produced known successful films like The Train, Kasme Vaade (1978). He directed films like Jawaani (1984), Pukar (1983) and Apne Apne (1987). He is the only filmmaker to have had R. D. Burman as the composer for all his films. He died on 5 January 1990.

== Personal life ==
His wife Madhu Behl was the daughter of actor Kamal Kapoor.

Behl's son Goldie Behl is also a director and producer. His daughter Srishti Arya (née Behl, married to Sameer Arya - the son of Sulbha Arya and Ishan Arya) is a producer, media executive, co-founder of Rose Audiovisuals with her brother Goldie, former treasurer and the Vice President of the Producers Guild of India, former core member of Indian Film and TV Producers Council, and was the head of Netflix India till 2021.

He is also father of 2 more daughters, Shraddha Behl and chef Tania R. Behl. Ramesh's sister Shukla was married to Rajendra Kumar.

== Filmography ==
As Director:

Year	Title
1978	Kasme Vaade
1981	Harjaee
1983	Jaane Jaan
1983	Pukar
1984	Jawaani
1987	Apne Apne

== See also ==
- List of Hindi film families
