= Kuku Kohli =

Indian film director (1949–2026)

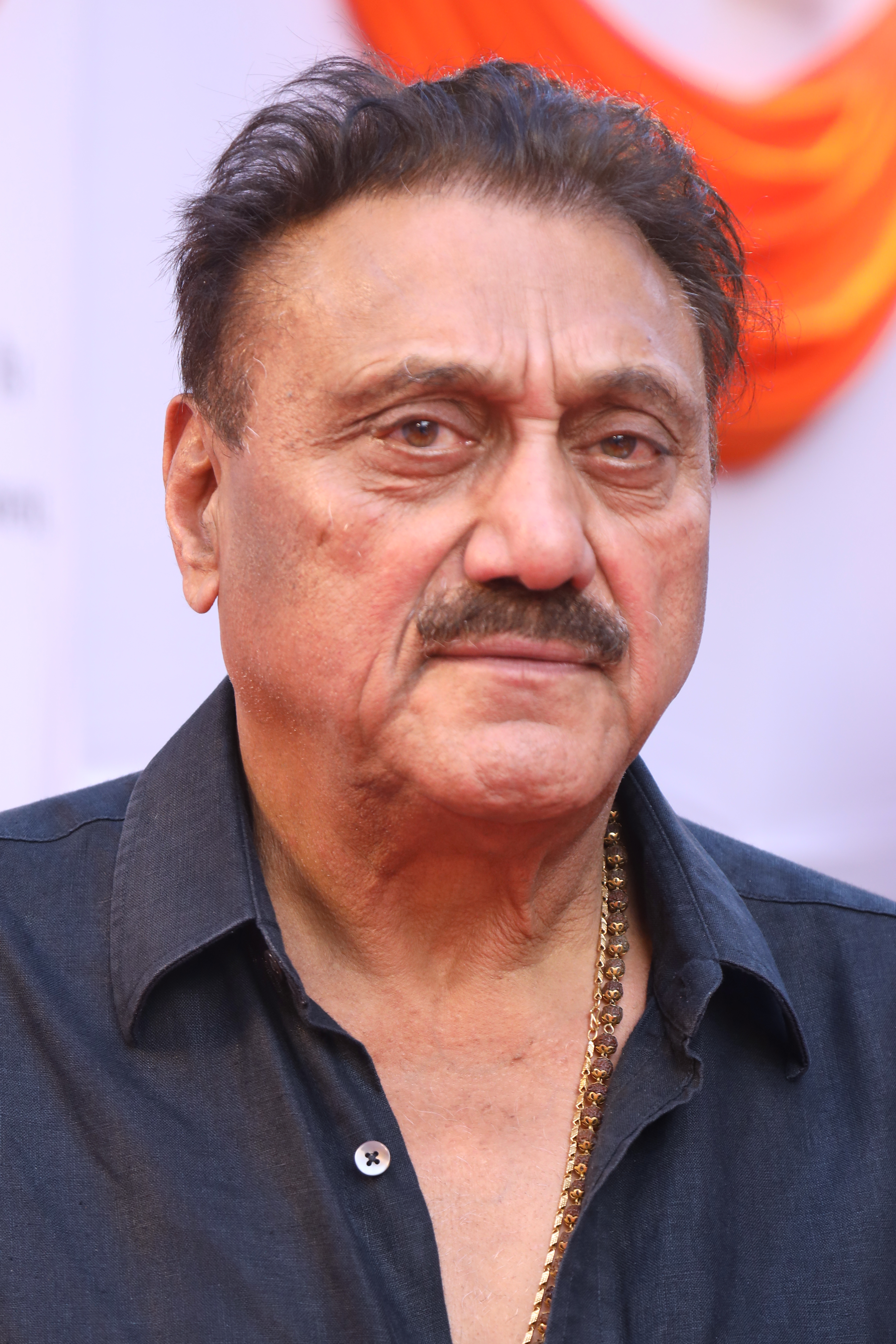
- Kohli in 2023
- Born: Avtar Kohli; 4 June 1949; Peshawar, Pakistan
- Died: 25 August 2026 (aged 77); Mumbai, Maharashtra, India
- Other name: Avtar Kohli
- Occupations: Director, producer
- Years active: 1973–2026
- Notable work: Phool Aur Kaante
- Spouse: Aruna Irani (m.1990 - 2026)
- Children: 2
- Relatives: Roy–Joshi–Irani-Desai family

Avtar Kohli (4 June 1949 – 25 August 2026), professionally known as Kuku Kohli, was an Indian film director, producer screenwriter and editor. He gave Ajay Devgan his first break in the 1991 superhit film Phool Aur Kaante.

== Career ==
Early in his career, he worked under Raj Kapoor for many years where he learned his skills. Kuku Kohli had been in the film industry for more than 30 years.

He was the second unit director of the film Betaab which was the launch pad of Sunny Deol and Amrita Singh and catapulted both into stardom as it was a golden jubilee film. Another film was Arjun starring Sunny Deol and Dimple Kapadia, was a silver jubilee film. He, then, directed Kohraam starring Dharmendra. After this, he directed Phool Aur Kaante which achieved diamond jubilee status and elevated the visibility of Ajay Devgan; Suhaag starring Ajay Devgan, Akshay Kumar, Karishma Kapoor, Nagma was again a golden jubilee; Haqeeqat starred Ajay Devgan and Tabu, it was nominated in seven categories including best director for the Filmfare Awards. Kohli was also nominated as the best director of the year for the same film for the Screen Awards. His next film was Anari No.1 starring Govinda in a double role. His directorial venture was Zulmi starring Akshay Kumar and Twinkle Khanna. This film had also run successfully everywhere.

Since then he had made Yeh Dil Aashiqanaa. Music maestros Nadeem-Shravan made a comeback into the industry with this film. His last directorial was Woh Tera Naam Tha starring Arjan Bajwa and Kanchi Kaul.

== Personal life and death ==
Kohli married actress Aruna Irani in 1990 and the couple have no children. This was his second marriage. His children from his first marriage with Rita Kohli are daughters Pooja Kohli, a producer, and Karishma Kohli, a filmmaker who has been an assistant director in movies like Ek Tha Tiger (2012) and Bajrangi Bhaijaan (2015), both by Kabir Khan, and has also co-directed the Netflix series The Fame Game (2022). Karishma married actor Mikhail Yawalkar in 2025.

Kohli died from a heart attack in Mumbai, on 25 August 2026, at the age of 77. He was cremated at the Oshiwara Crematorium.

== Filmography ==
=== Director ===
- Kohraam (1991)
- Phool Aur Kaante (1991)
- Suhaag (1994)
- Haqeeqat (1995)
- Anari No.1 (1999)
- Zulmi (1999)
- Yeh Dil Aashiqanaa (2002)
- Woh Tera Naam Tha (2004)

== See also ==
Indian Motion Picture Producers' Association
