= Haath Ki Safai =

1974 Hindi film

- Film poster
- Directed by: Prakash Mehra
- Written by: Salim–Javed
- Story by: Om Dogra; Ehtram Husain
- Based on: Do Ustad (1959 film)
- Produced by: I.A. Nadiadwala
- Starring: Vinod Khanna; Hema Malini; Randhir Kapoor; Simi Garewal; Ranjeet
- Cinematography: Sudhin Mazumdar
- Edited by: R. D. Mahadik
- Music by: Kalyanji-Anandji Gulshan Bawra(lyrics)
- Production company: Pushpa Pictures
- Distributed by: Goldmines Telefilms
- Release date: 30 August 1974
- Country: India
- Language: Hindi

Haath Ki Safai (lit. 'Skill of Hand'; a euphemism for pickpocketing) is a 1974 Indian Hindi-language masala film, written by Salim–Javed, produced by I.A Nadiadwala, and directed by Prakash Mehra. The film stars Vinod Khanna, Randhir Kapoor and Hema Malini. Vinod Khanna won the Filmfare Award for Best Supporting Actor, the only nomination for the film. The rest of the cast includes Simi Garewal, Ranjeet and Satyen Kappu. It was a remake of 1959 film Do Ustad. The music is by Kalyanji Anandji. The film became a "semi-hit" at the box office.

The film was later remade in Telugu as Manushulu Chesina Dongalu (1976) and in Tamil as Savaal (1981).

== Plot ==
Two brothers get separated when fleeing from their village and reach Mumbai. Raju is led to a crook Usmanbhai Bombay and becomes a pickpocket under his tutelage. The elder, Shankar becomes a crime-boss. Shankar is popularly known as Kumar in his circle and is married to Roma, who is pregnant with their child. Roma is unaware of his criminal activities. He runs a hotel as a cover for his criminal activities and is mostly involved in smuggling gold and diamonds. Kamini is an orphaned girl, living with her crook uncle Chopra. For a dance show she arrives at Mumbai with her troupe and is robbed of her purse by a pickpocket. Raju retrieves her purse from another pickpocket Raghu only to steal her expensive necklace. Kamini's uncle owes one million rupees to another criminal, Ranjeet (Ranjeet). In order to pay his debt he advises Ranjeet to marry Kamini, so that he can inherit her wealth worth five million. Kamini runs away from her home.

In order to trace her, Ranjeet advertises in a newspaper that Kamini has run away from home with jewellery worth one million. Raju is the first one to trace her and entices her to an isolated bungalow. Here, Kamini confesses her love for Raju, and pretends to love her in return. He secretly checks all her baggage for jewellery and is disappointed to find that she has none.

Shankar is able to trace Raju and trades Kamini for Rs. 10,000. Kamini is heartbroken with the reality. Ranjeet pays off Shankar for Kamini, while Kamini slips past his custody just in time. Coincidentally, she seeks shelter at Shankar's home and Roma learns much about him. She is shocked and tries to kill herself. Shankar assumes that she has killed herself, but is saved by Raju in the nick of time and takes her home. Since she is pregnant, the doctor advises her to rest. Shankar is heartbroken and vows to give up all his criminal activities. He also gives shelter to Kamini and keeps her at his home. Kamini respects Shankar for his gesture and treats him like an elder brother.

He returns the money to Ranjeet, which infuriates him and he wants revenge. Meanwhile, Kamini has a change of heart towards Raju when she learns that Raju has given up his pickpocketing and wants to lead a dignified life with her. Ranjeet decides to use Raju as a pawn to exact revenge. Through Raju, he manages to have Shankar arrested in an attempt to smuggle gold (his old commitment and final job), but Shankar somehow manages to hide the gold before being arrested. In order to create a rift between Kamini and Raju, he tells her that Raju got Shankar arrested. Kamini straight away goes to his home to find the truth and comes across Roma and her newborn baby. Kamini tells Roma that Shankar is truly sorry for his acts and has given up all his criminal activities.

Kamini inform Shankar that Roma is alive and has their baby. Ranjeet manages to kidnap Kamini and desires to marry her. Kamini reveals that she has not inherited any wealth and her uncle was lying to him. Ranjeet then plans to trade her with Shankar for the smuggled gold. Shankar escapes the prison to see his wife. He encounters Raju and Raju is able to nab him and tie him up. Raju trades Shankar for Kamini and returns home with the purse he had pocketed of Shankar. At home, when he checks the contents he realises that Shankar is his long lost brother and goes to save Shankar. The film ends with a typical Bollywood climax, where Raju is able to save Shankar.

== Cast ==
- Vinod Khanna as Shankar/Kumar Sahab
- Hema Malini as Kamini Chopra
- Randhir Kapoor as Raju Tardev
- Simi Garewal as Roma
- Ranjeet as Ranjeet
- Sapru (actor) as Baba Sheikh
- Satyen Kappu as Usmanbhai Bombay
- Master Ripple as young Raju
- Master Ashiq as young Shankar
- Ram Mohan as Ram singh
- Viju Khote as Damodar
- Ruby Myers as Aunty, local bar owner
- Mushtaq Merchant as Johny
- Ram Sethi as Totaram
- Randhir (actor) as Chopra, Kamini's uncle
- Goga Kapoor as Raghu

== Soundtrack ==
Peene Wale Ko Peene Ka Bahana is about the play Devdas with Randhir Kapoor as Devdas and Hema Malini as Chandramukhi. Lyrics were penned down by Gulshan Kumar Mehta with his pen-name, Gulshan Bawra.

Vaada Karle Sajna is the most popular song of the film by Mohd Rafi and Lata Mangeshkar.

Title	Singer(s)	Raga
"Hum Ko Mohabbat Ho Gai Hai"	Kishore Kumar, Lata Mangeshkar	
"Peene Wale Ko Peene Ka Bahana"	Kishore Kumar, Hema Malini	
"Oopar Wale Teri Duniya Mein"	Mahendra Kapoor	
"Tu Kya Jane O Bewafa"	Lata Mangeshkar	
"Wada Kar Le Sajna"	Mohammed Rafi, Lata Mangeshkar	Basant Mukhari

== Awards ==
22nd Filmfare Awards:

Won

- Best Supporting Actor – Vinod Khanna
