= Lafange =

- Movie Poster
- Directed by: Harmesh Malhotra
- Starring: Randhir Kapoor; Mumtaz; Pran
- Music by: Laxmikant–Pyarelal
- Release date: 1975
- Country: India
- Language: Hindi

Lafange is a 1975 Bollywood film directed by Harmesh Malhotra. It stars Randhir Kapoor, Mumtaz, Pran in lead roles and music by Laxmikant-Pyarelal.

== Plot ==
Beautiful Sapna lives with her wealthy father, Dhanraj, and a younger brother in a palatial house. Her father comes across some valuable diamonds and conceals them in a secret place. While driving one day, Dhanraj is killed, but her brother escapes without any injuries, but loses control of his vocal chords unable to tell anyone how the accident occurred, and goes missing. After Sapna wins a beauty contest, she travels to Bombay and meets with a young wheel-chair bound soldier named Gopal, and both fall in love with each other. What Sapna does not know is that Gopal is a fraud, a con-man who is only after her money. Then her life is even more complicated after she finds out that her father was killed by a man named Diwan. Before she could think of taking any further action, Diwan and his men track her down – their goal to find the secret location of the diamonds hidden by Dhanraj – and kill anyone who dares to get in their way.

== Cast ==
- Randhir Kapoor as Gopal
- Mumtaz as Sapna Dhanraj
- Pran as Lal
- Asha Sachdev as Leena
- D. K. Sapru as Dhanraj
- Anwar Hussain as Diwan Chamanlal
- Ram Mohan as Tiger
- Manorama as Mrs. Rana

== Music ==
Tracklist
Song	Singer
"Hum Lafange Hai"	Kishore Kumar
"Ud Chala Panchhi Banke"	Lata Mangeshkar
"Aap Ki Kasam, Ek Din Sanam"	Mohammed Rafi
"Ib Lagan Lagi, Kya Karna, Mushkil Hai Jeena Marna"	Asha Bhosle, Mohammed Rafi
"Aayi Kisi Ki Yaad To Armaan Machal Pade"	Asha Bhosle, Manna Dey
