= Aruna Irani =

Indian actress (born 1946)

- Born: 18 August 1946 (age 80); Bombay, Maharashtra, India
- Occupations: Actress; television personality
- Years active: 1958–present
- Spouse: Kuku Kohli (m. 1990)

Aruna Irani (born 18 August 1946) is an Indian actress, who has acted in over 500 films throughout Hindi, Kannada, Punjabi, Marathi and Gujarati cinema, playing mostly supporting and character roles. She received two Filmfare Awards for Best Supporting Actress for Pet Pyaar Aur Paap (1984) and Beta (1992), and holds the record for the most nominations in the category (10). In January 2012, Irani received the Filmfare Lifetime Achievement Award at the 57th Filmfare Awards.

== Early life ==
Aruna was born in Mumbai, India to an Irani father and a Hindu mother. Her father, Faredun Irani, ran a drama troupe, and her mother, Saguna, was an actress. She is the eldest of eight siblings.

She aspired to become a doctor, but had to discontinue her studies after the sixth standard due to financial constraints.

She later stated that she learned dancing while working in films, as she could not afford formal training.

Her brothers Indra Kumar, Adi Irani and Firoz Irani are associated with the film industry. Actresses Sarita Joshi and Bindu are her cousins.

== Career ==
Aruna Irani made her debut as a child artist in the film Ganga Jumna (1961) playing Azra's childhood character. She then acted in the film Anpadh (1962) as Mala Sinha's childhood character. She next did several small roles in films such as Jahanara (1964), Farz (1967), Upkar (1967) and Aaya Sawan Jhoomke (1969). She later acted with comedian Mehmood in films such as Aulad (1968), Humjoli (1970), Devi (1970) and Naya Zamana (1971).

In 1971, she starred in Caravan, as a knife-thrower, earning her first nomination for the Filmfare Award for Best Supporting Actress. She later starred in Mehmood Ali's Bombay To Goa (1972), Garam Masala (1972) and Do Phool (1973). Her films have included Farz (1967), Bobby (1973), Fakira (1976), Sargam (1979), Red Rose (1980), Love Story (1981), and Rocky (1981), earning nominations for the Filmfare Award for Best Supporting Actress for Bobby and Rocky. She also starred in Do Jhoot (1975) and Khoon Pasina (1977) which earned her two more nominations for the Filmfare Award for Best Supporting Actress.

After having lost the award five time, she won her first Filmfare Award for Best Supporting Actress for Pet Pyaar Aur Paap (1984).

In the late 1980s and 1990s, Irani switched to playing motherly roles, notably in Beta (1992), for which she won her second Filmfare Award for Best Supporting Actress. She earned two more nominations for the Filmfare Award for Best Supporting Actress for her performances in Suhaag (1994) and Kartavya (1995). She acted in the Kannada remake of the same film with the same role. Some of her Marathi films are Aandhla Marto Dola, Bhingari, Changu Mangu, Lapwa Chapvi, Ek Gadi Baki Anadi, Mitwaa and Bol Baby Bol.

She earned her record-setting tenth nomination for the Filmfare Award for Best Supporting Actress for her performance in Ghulam-E-Mustafa (1997).

In her later career, Irani also switched to television, performing character roles in various serials. She also took up direction and production of tele-serials such as Mehndi Tere Naam Ki, Des Mein Niklla Hoga Chand, Rabba Ishq Na Hove, Vaidehi and more.

On 19 February 2012, she was awarded the Filmfare Lifetime Achievement Award.

== Personal life ==
She married Bollywood film director Kuku Kohli in 1990. He died of heart attack on 25 August 2026.

== Filmography ==
Year	Film	Role	Notes
1958	Shikwa		Unreleased
1960	Sarhad		Child Artist
1961	Gunga Jumna	Young Kamla	as Child artist
1961	Gungi Ladki		
1962	Tarzan The Storm		
1962	Anpadh	Young Lajwanti	as Child artist
1963	Zingaro		
1963	Satyavan Savitri		
1963	Parasmani	Bijli	
1963	Nartaki	Lakshmi's Colleague	
1964	Jahanara		
1964	Ganga Ki Lahren		
1966	Kalapi		
1966	Spy in Goa	Lilli	
1967	Farz		
1967	Patthar Ke Sanam		
1967	Upkar		
1968	Anokhi Raat		
1968	Aulad		
1969	Tumse Achha Kaun Hai		
1969	Aya Sawan Jhoom Ke		
1969	Anjaan Hai Koi		
1969	Oos Raat Ke Baad		
1969	Samay Bada Balwan		
1970	Humjoli		
1970	Aan Milo Sajna		
1970	Safar		
1970	The Train		
1971	Naya Zamana		
1971	Man Mandir		
1971	Ek Paheli		
1971	Johar Mehmood in Hong Kong		
1971	Ek Naari Ek Brahmchari		
1971	Caravan	Nisha	
1971	Buddha Mil Gaya	Parvati	
1971	Andaz		
1971	Sanjog		
1972	Garam Masala		
1972	Bombay to Goa		
1973	Bobby		
1973	Do Phool		
1974	Prem Nagar		
1974	Roti Kapda Aur Makaan		
1974	Har Har Mahadev		
1975	Deewaar	Special appearance in the song	Uncredited
1975	Mili		
1975	Do Jasoos		
1975	Dharamjeet		Punjabi film; Dual role
1975	Khel Khel Mein		
1975	Ranga Khush		
1976	Santo Banto	Santo / Banto (dual role	Dual role; Punjabi film
1976	Sankoch		
1976	Bhanwar		
1976	Charas		
1976	Sangram		
1976	Fakira		
1976	Zindagi	Sudha N. Shukla	
1976	Laila Majnu	Zarina	
1976	Rangaa Aur Raja		
1976	Apnapan		
1976	Duniyadaari		
1976	Do Chehere		
1976	Khoon Pasina		
1976	Jadu Tona		
1978	Shalimar		
1978	Khoon Ki Pukaar		
1979	Gol Maal		
1979	Jaani Dushman		
1979	Kartavya	Lachhi	
1979	Surakshaa	Ruby	
1980	Beqasoor		
1980	Karz		
1980	Kali Ghata	Pinky	
1980	Morcha		
1980	Qurbani		
1980	Judaai	Miss Lily, dancer	
1980	Phir Wohi Raat	Shobha	
1980	Hum Paanch	Nishi	
1980	Jwalamukhi		
1981	Kaaran		
1981	Aas Paas		
1981	Commander		
1981	Rocky		
1981	Jyoti		
1981	Love Story		
1981	Thee (Tamil film)	Item dancer	
1981	Yaarana		
1981	Kudrat		
1981	Ammakkorumma		
1981	Lawaaris		
1982	Angoor		
1982	Bemisal		
1982	Brij Bhoomi		
1983	Ek Din Bahu Ka		
1983	Bade Dil Wala		
1983	Thai Veedu (Tamil film)		
1983	Jhutha Sach		
1983	Mawali		
1983	Hamar Bhauji		Bhojpuri film
1984	Pet Pyaar Aur Paap		
1984	Ghar Ek Mandir		
1985	Paththar	Nirmala	
1985	Masterji		
1985	Patthar Dil		
1985	Bhago Bhut Aaya	Nirmala / Manorama	
1985	Aaj Ka Daur		
1985	Piya Ke Gaon		
1985	Dikri Chaali Sasariye		
1985	Lallu Ram	Champa	
1986	Naache Mayuri		
1987	Insaniyat Ke Dushman		
1988	Dayavan		
1988	Ek Gadi Baaki Anadi		
1988	Janam Janam		
1988	Mera Muqaddar	Shanti	
1988	Mere Baad		
1988	Inteqam		
1988	Bees Saal Baad		
1988	Zulm Ko Jala Doonga		
1988	Shahenshah		
1989	ChaalBaaz		
1989	Na Insaafi	Sharda Khanna	
1990	Changu Mangu		Marathi film
1990	Majboor		
1990	Doodh Ka Karz		Bilingual film
1990	Bandh Darwaza	Mahua Daayan Kunka	
1990	Jungle Love		
1990	Bahurani	Item dancer in the song "Katori Pe Katora"	Special appearance
1991	Brahmarshi Vishwamitra	Kalakoushukudu's wife	
1991	Phool Aur Kaante		
1991	Shanti Kranti		
1992	Kisme Kitna Hai Dum	Vijay Singh's wife	
1992	Lambu Dada		
1992	Beta		
1992	Umar 55 Ki Dil Bachpan Ka		
1992	Jeena Marna Tere Sang		
1993	Annayya	Nagamani	Kannada film
1993	Hum Hain Kamaal Ke		
1994	Anokha Premyudh		
1994	Fauj	Durga	
1994	Raja Babu		
1994	Laadla		
1994	Suhaag		
1995	Bewafa Sanam		
1996	Indian	Gulabo	Hindi version only
1996	Chhote Sarkar		
1997	Hameshaa		
1997	Dil To Pagal Hai		
1998	Saaz		
1998	Saazish		
1998	Kudrat		
1998	Doli Saja Ke Rakhna		
1999	Anari No.1		
1999	Zulmi		
1999	Haseena Maan Jaayegi		
1999	Aarzoo		
2002	Hum Tumhare Hain Sanam	Laxmi	
2010	Khatta Meetha	Sheetaladevi Tichkule	
2014	Bol Baby Bol		Marathi film
2015	Mitwaa	Rosie aunty	Marathi film
2019	Chaal Jeevi Laiye!	Dr. Vadia (guest appearance)	Gujarati film
2022	Kahani Rubberband Ki		
2024	Ghudchadi	Kalyani Devi	
2025	Kesari Veer	Charan Jagdamba	
2025	Jalso - A Family Invitation (Gujarati film)		
2026	O'Romeo	Brothel Owner	

=== Television shows ===
Year	Show	Character	Notes
1995–1997	Zamana Badal Gaya	Veena	Lead
2001–2005	Des Mein Niklla Hoga Chand	Teji	Also as a producer under AK Films
2000–2002	Mehndi Tere Naam Ki	Sharada Jayant Malik	Also as a producer under AK Films
2003–2005	Tum Bin Jaaoon Kahaan	Shalini Avinash Mathur	Also as a producer under AK Films
2005–2006	Zameen Se Aassman Tak	Balraj's Mother	Also as a producer under AK Films
2005–2006	Rabba Ishq Na Hove	Veera's Mother	Also as a producer under AK Films
2006	Vaidehi	Sita	Also as a producer under AK Films
2006–2007	Kahaani Ghar Ghar Ki	Narayani Devi	Balaji Telefilms
2007	Maayka	Durga Khurana	
2007–2009	Babul Ki Bitiya Chali Doli Saja Ke	Dadima	Also as a producer under AK Films
2007–2009	Naaginn	Maasa/ Triveni	Also as a producer under AK Films
2008	Saas v/s Bahu	Judge	
2009–2011	Jhansi Ki Rani	Vahini Sahiba	
2010–2011	Sanjog Se Bani Sangini	Rajrani	
2011–2012	Dekha Ek Khwaab	Rajmata Mrinalini Devi	Lead
2011–2012	Main Lakshmi Tere Aangan Ki	Sharda Agnihotri	
2012	Parichay — Nayee Zindagi Kay Sapno Ka	Sulekha Diwan	
2013–2014	Sanskaar - Dharohar Apno Ki	Ansuya Vaishnav	
2015–2016	Bhagyalakshmi	Vasundhara Prajapati	
2015	Uzalo	Producer of AK Films	Producer
2016	Saubhagyalakshmi	Vasundhara Prajapati	
2018	Porus	The Oracle	
2018–2019	Dastaan-E-Mohabbat Salim Anarkali	Hamida Banu Begum (Mariam Makani)	
2019	Dil Toh Happy Hai Ji	Mrs Khosla	
2019	Yeh Un Dinon Ki Baat Hai	Herself	

== Awards and nominations ==
Film

Year	Award	Film	Category	Result	Ref.
1972	Filmfare Awards	Caravan	Best Supporting Actress	Nominated	
1974	Filmfare Awards	Bobby	Best Supporting Actress	Nominated	
1976	Filmfare Awards	Do Jhoot	Best Supporting Actress	Nominated	
1978	Filmfare Awards	Khoon Pasina	Best Supporting Actress	Nominated	
1982	Filmfare Awards	Rocky	Best Supporting Actress	Nominated	
1985	Filmfare Awards	Pet Pyaar Aur Paap	Best Supporting Actress	Won	
1993	Filmfare Awards	Beta	Best Supporting Actress	Won	
1995	Filmfare Awards	Suhaag	Best Supporting Actress	Nominated	
1996	Filmfare Awards	Kartavya	Best Supporting Actress	Nominated	
1998	Filmfare Awards	Ghulam-E-Mustafa	Best Supporting Actress	Nominated	
2012	Filmfare Awards	—N/a	Lifetime Achievement Award	Won	
1993	Bengal Film Journalists' Association Awards	Beta	Best Supporting Actress (Hindi)	Won	
2020	Maharashtra State Film Awards	—N/a	Raj Kapoor Award	Honoured	

Television

Year	Award	Show	Category	Result	Ref.
2003	Indian Telly Awards	Des Mein Niklla Hoga Chand	Best Weekly Show	Won (Note: Tied with Sanjivani.)	
2003	Indian Telly Awards	Des Mein Niklla Hoga Chand	Best Programme of the Year	Won	
2003	Indian Telly Awards	Des Mein Niklla Hoga Chand	Best Director	Won (Note: Tied with Sourabh Narang for Haqeeqat.)	
2004	Indian Telly Awards	Des Mein Niklla Hoga Chand	Best Actress in a Supporting Role	Nominated	
2006	Indian Telly Awards	Vaidehi	Best Actress in a Supporting Role	Nominated	
2007	Indian Telly Awards	Maayka	Best Actress in a Negative Role	Nominated	
2008	Gold Awards	Naaginn	Best Actress in a Supporting Role	Won	
