= Bappi Lahiri discography =

Indian singer, composer, and record producer

Bappi Lahiri (born Alokesh Aparesh Lahiri; 27 November 1952 – 15 February 2022) was an Indian singer, composer and record producer. He popularised the use of synthesised disco music in Indian music industry and sang some of his own compositions. He was popular in the 1980s and 1990s with filmi soundtracks. He delivered major box office successes in Bengali, Hindi, Telugu, and Kannada films. His music was well received into the 21st century.

In 1986, he was recognised by Guinness World Records for recording more than 180 songs in one year. He has scored music for total 480 films. The following is a complete list of the films he composed for:

== 1970s ==
Year	Film	Notes	Language
1969	Daadu	Debut	Bengali
1972	Janatar Adalat		Bengali
1973	Nanha Shikari		Hindi
1973	Charitra		Hindi
1974	Bazar Band Karo		Hindi
1974	Ek Ladki Badnaam Si		Hindi
1975	Zakhmee		Hindi
1976	Chalte Chalte		Hindi
1976	Sangram		Hindi
1977	Aap Ki Khatir		Hindi
1977	Haiwan		Hindi
1977	Paapi		Hindi
1977	Phir Janam Lenge Hum		Hindi
1977	Pratima Aur Payal		Hindi
1978	College Girl		Hindi
1978	Dil Sey Miley Dil		Hindi
1978	Khoon Ki Pukaar		Hindi
1978	Tere Pyaar Mein		Hindi
1978	Toote Khilone		Hindi
1979	Aangan Ki Kali		Hindi
1979	Ahsaas		Hindi
1979	Aur Kaun		Hindi
1979	Do Hawaldar		Hindi
1979	Ikraar		Hindi
1979	Jaan-E-Bahaar		Hindi
1979	Lahu Ke Do Rang		Hindi
1979	Surakksha	Also Singer	Hindi
1979	Shikhshaa		Hindi

== 1980s ==
Year	Film	Notes	Language
1980	Agreement		Hindi
1980	Apne Paraye		Hindi
1980	Beqasoor		Hindi
1980	Ek Baar Kaho		Hindi
1980	Guest House		Hindi
1980	Humkadam		Hindi
1980	Kismet		Hindi
1980	Manokamna	Also Singer	Hindi
1980	Morcha		Hindi
1980	Patiala		Hindi
1980	Pyara Dushman		Hindi
1980	Saboot		Hindi
1980	Taxi Chor		Hindi
1981	Armaan		Hindi
1981	Bhula Na Dena		Hindi
1981	Dahshat		Hindi
1981	Jeene Ki Aarzoo		Hindi
1981	Josh		Hindi
1981	Jyoti		Hindi
1981	Laparwah		Hindi
1981	Nayi Imarat		Hindi
1981	Paanch Qaidi		Hindi
1981	Sahhas		Hindi
1981	Ogo Bodhu Shundori	Also Singer	Bengali
1981	Wardat	Also Singer	Hindi
1982	Dial 100		Hindi
1982	Agent Raaj	Also Singer	Bengali
1982	Disco Dancer	Also Singer	Hindi
1982	Do Ustad		Hindi
1982	Dulha Bikta Hai		Hindi
1982	Gumsoom		Hindi
1982	Haathkadi		Hindi
1982	Kehdo Pyaar Hai		Hindi
1982	Maut Ka Saaya		Hindi
1982	Namak Halaal	Also Singer	Hindi
1982	Shiv Charan		Hindi
1982	Sugandh		Hindi
1982	Sumbandh		Hindi
1982	Suraag	Also Singer	Hindi
1982	Taqdeer Ka Badshah		Hindi
1982	Pyaas		Hindi
1983	Ab Meri Baari		Hindi
1983	Bura Aadmi		Hindi
1983	Do Gulaab		Hindi
1983	Doosri Dulhan		Hindi
1983	Apoorva Sahodarigal		Tamil
1983	Ek Din Bahu Ka		Hindi
1983	Film Hi Film		Hindi
1983	Himmatwala		Hindi
1983	Humse Na Jeeta Koi		Hindi
1983	Jaani Dost		Hindi
1983	Jeet Hamaari		Hindi
1983	Justice Chaudhury		Hindi
1983	Karate		Hindi
1983	Kissise Na Kehna		Hindi
1983	Laalach		Hindi
1983	Love in Goa		Hindi
1983	Maawali		Hindi
1983	Naukar Biwi Ka	Also Singer	Hindi
1983	Pasand Apni Apni		Hindi
1983	Protidan		Bengali
1984	Aaj Ka M.L.A. Ram Avtar	Also Singer	Hindi
1984	Bhavna		Hindi
1984	Chakma		Hindi
1984	Dujone		Bengali
1984	Gangvaa		Hindi
1984	Gangvaa		Kannada
1984	Haisiyat		Hindi
1984	Hum Rahe Na Hum		Hindi
1984	Kaamyab		Hindi
1984	Kamla		Hindi
1984	Kasam Paida Karne Wale Ki	Also Singer	Hindi
1984	Maqsad		Hindi
1984	Meri Adalat		Hindi
1984	Naya Kadam		Hindi
1984	Pet Pyaar Aur Paap		Hindi
1984	Qaidi		Hindi
1984	Raja Aur Rana		Hindi
1984	Shapath		Hindi
1984	Sharaabi		Hindi
1984	Sheeshey Ka Ghar		Hindi
1984	Shravan Kumar		Hindi
1984	Tarkeeb		Hindi
1984	Teri Bahon Mein		Hindi
1984	Tohfa		Hindi
1984	Wanted		Hindi
1984	Waqt Ki Pukar		Hindi
1984	Yaadgar		Hindi
1985	3D Saamri		Hindi
1985	Aaj Ka Daur		Hindi
1985	Aandhi Toofan		Hindi
1985	Adventures of Tarzan		Hindi
1985	Aitbaar		Hindi
1985	Antarale		Bengali
1985	Baadal		Hindi
1985	Balidaan		Hindi
1985	Bandhan Anjana		Hindi
1985	Bewafai		Hindi
1985	Bhavani Junction		Hindi
1985	Geraftaar		Hindi
1985	Haqeeqat		Hindi
1985	Haveli		Hindi
1985	Hoshiyar		Hindi
1985	Insaaf Main Karoongaa	Also Singer	Hindi
1985	Jhoothi		Hindi
1985	Kaala Sooraj		Hindi
1985	Karmyudh		Hindi
1985	Lover Boy		Hindi
1985	Maa Kasam		Hindi
1985	Maha Shaktimaan		Hindi
1985	Mahaguru		Hindi
1985	Maharudra	marked the Bengali debut of singers K. J. Yesudas and Kavita Krishnamurthy	Bengali
1985	Masterji		Hindi
1985	Mera Saathi		Hindi
1985	Mohabbat		Hindi
1985	Paadum Vaanampadi		Tamil
1985	Pataal Bhairavi		Hindi
1985	Pyari Behna		Hindi
1985	Saaheb	Also Singer	Hindi
1985	Salma		Hindi
1985	Wafadaar		Hindi
1986	Adhikar		Hindi
1986	Africadalli Sheela		Kannada
1986	Avinash		Hindi
1986	Dharm Adhikari		Hindi
1986	Dilwaala		Hindi
1986	Ilzaam		Hindi
1986	Insaaf Ki Awaaz		Hindi
1986	Kasme Rasme		Hindi
1986	Kirayadar		Hindi
1986	Kismetwala		Hindi
1986	Krishna Nee Begane Baro		Kannada
1986	Locket		Hindi
1986	Main Balwan		Hindi
1986	Mera Dharam		Hindi
1986	Muddat		Hindi
1986	Shart (1986)		Hindi
1986	Sheela		Hindi
1986	Sheesha		Hindi
1986	Simhasanam		Telugu
1986	Singhasan		Hindi
1986	Suhaagan		Hindi
1986	Urbashi		Bengali
1987	Aag Hi Aag		Hindi
1987	Amar Sangi	Also Singer	Bengali
1987	Dance Dance	Also Singer	Hindi
1987	Dak Bangla		Hindi
1987	Diljalaa		Hindi
1987	Guru Dakshina	Also Singer	Bengali
1987	Himmat Aur Mehanat		Hindi
1987	Kali Dada		Hindi
1987	Kizhakku Africavil Sheela		Tamil
1987	Majaal		Hindi
1987	Mera Yaar Mera Dushman		Hindi
1987	Muqaddar Ka Faisla		Hindi
1987	Param Dharam		Hindi
1987	Protikar		Bengali
1987	Pyaar Karke Dekho		Hindi
1987	Pyar Ke Kabil		Hindi
1987	Sabse Badi Adalat		Hindi
1987	Sadak Chhap		Hindi
1987	Satyamev Jayate	Also Singer	Hindi
1987	Secret Agent	last film song of Mohammad Rafi appeared in this film, a duet with Asha Bhosle	Hindi
1987	Samrat		Telugu
1987	Sankharavam		Telugu
1987	Thene Manasulu		Telugu
1987	Trimurtulu		Telugu
1988	Aaj Ke Angaarey		Hindi
1988	Akarshan		Hindi
1988	Antaranga		Hindi
1988	Collector Vijaya		Telugu
1988	Commando		Hindi
1988	Debibaran		Bengali
1988	Ghar Ghar Ki Kahani		Hindi
1988	Gunahon Ka Faisla		Hindi
1988	Halaal Ki Kamaai		Hindi
1988	Hatya		Hindi
1988	Kab Tak Chup Rahungi		Hindi
1988	Kanwarlal		Hindi
1988	Kasam		Hindi
1988	Manmadha Saamrajyam		Telugu
1988	Mardangi		Hindi
1988	Mera Shikar	Also Singer	Hindi
1988	Mulzim		Hindi
1988	Paap Ko Duniya		Hindi
1988	Proteek		Bengali
1988	Sagar Sangam	Hindi	
1988	Sone Pe Suhaaga	Hindi	
1988	Tamacha	Hindi	
1988	Veerana	Hindi	
1988	Waqt Ki Awaz	Hindi	
1988	Woh Mili Thi	Hindi	
1988	Zakhmi Aurat	Hindi	
1989	Aag Ka Gola	Hindi	
1989	Aamar Tumi	Also Singer	Bengali
1989	Aakhri Gulam		Hindi
1989	Agni Trishna		Bengali
1989	Ajeeb Ittefaq		Hindi
1989	Albela		Hindi
1989	Amar Prem	Also Singer	Bengali
1989	Asha O Bhalobasha	Also Singer	Bengali
1989	Farz Ki Jung		Hindi
1989	Gair Kanooni		Hindi
1989	Garibon Ka Daata		Hindi
1989	Gentleman		Hindi
1989	Ghar Ka Chiraag		Hindi
1989	Gola Barood		Hindi
1989	Guru	Also Singer	Hindi
1989	Guru		Kannada
1989	Hum Bhi Insaan Hain		Hindi
1989	Hum Intezaar Karenge		Hindi
1989	Kahaan Hai Kanoon		Hindi
1989	Kanoon Apna Apna		Hindi
1989	Kasam Vardi Kee		Hindi
1989	Khoj		Hindi
1989	Khooni Murdaa		Hindi
1989	Love Love Love		Hindi
1989	Mahal		Hindi
1989	Main Tere Liye		Hindi
1989	Mandanda		Bengali
1989	Mangaldeep		Bengali
1989	Mitti Aur Sona		Hindi
1989	Mohabbat Ka Paigham		Hindi
1989	Na-Insaafi		Hindi
1989	Noyon Moni		Bengali
1989	Prem Pratigyaa	Also Singer	Hindi
1989	Pronomi Tomay	Also Singer	Bengali
1989	Saaya		
1989	Sachche Ka Bol-Bala		
1989	Sikka		
1989	State Rowdy		Telugu
1989	Zakhm		Hindi

== 1990s ==
Year	Film	Notes	Language
1990	Aaj Ka Arjun		Hindi
1990	Aaj Ke Shahenshah		Hindi
1990	Aandhiyan		
1990	Amar Bodhua		Bengali
1990	Ashrita		Bengali
1990	Awaragardi		
1990	Awwal Number		
1990	Badnam	Also Singer	Bengali
1990	Bolidan	Features popular song by Usha Uthup, "Uri Uri Baba"	Bengali
1990	Chinna		Telugu
1990	Chinna Kodalu		Telugu
1990	Ghar Ho To Aisa		
1990	Ghayal	"All Songs"	Hindi
1990	Haar Jeet		
1990	Kali Ganga		
1990	Karishma Kali Kaa		
1990	Mandira	Also Singer	Bengali
1990	Naaka Bandi		
1990	Paapi		Bengali
1990	Pyaar Ke Naam Qurban		
1990	Naakabandi	Also Singer	Hindi
1990	Raktareen		Bengali
1990	Roti Kee Keemat		
1990	Sailaab	Along with Aadesh Shrivastava	Hindi
1990	Shaitani Ilaaka		
1990	Shandar		
1990	Sherma Shamshera		
1990	Shikanja		
1990	Thanedaar	Also Singer	Hindi
1991	Aakhri Cheekh		
1991	Afsana Pyar Ka		
1991	Antarer Bhalobasha		
1991	Dushman Devta		
1991	Farishtay		Hindi
1991	First Love Letter	"All Songs"	Hindi
1991	Gang Leader		Telugu
1991	Garajna		
1991	Hafta Bandh		
1991	Hag Toofan		
1991	Hai Meri Jaan		
1991	Indra Bhavanam		Telugu
1991	Inspector Dhanush		
1991	Inspector Kiron		
1991	Kohraam		
1991	Nachnewale Gaanewale		
1991	Numbri Aadmi		Hindi
1991	Patthar Ke Insaan		
1991	Phool Bane Angaray		
1991	Police Matthu Dada		Kannada
1991	Pratikar	Also Singer	Hindi
1991	Pyaar Ka Saudagar		
1991	Raiszada		
1991	Rowdy Gaari Pellam		Telugu
1991	Rowdy Alludu		Telugu
1991	Rupaye Dus Karod		
1991	Sau Crore		Hindi
1991	Swarg Jaisaa Ghar		Hindi
1991	Vishkanya	"All Songs"	Hindi
1991	Yodha		
1992	Aaj Ki Taaqat		
1992	Aman Ke Farishtey		
1992	Anutap		Bengali
1992	Apon Por		Bengali
1992	Bondhu Amar		Bengali
1992	Brahma		Telugu
1992	Deewana Aashiq		
1992	Donga Police		Telugu
1992	Geet	"All Songs"	Hindi
1992	Insaaf Ki Devi		
1992	Isi Ka Naam Zindagi		
1992	Mere Meherban		
1992	Naseebwala		
1992	Naya Sawan		
1992	Police Aur Mujrim	"All Songs"	Hindi
1992	Priya	"All Songs"	Bengali
1992	Rakte Lekha	"All Songs", Also Singer	Bengali
1992	Raktha Tharpanam		Telugu
1992	Rowdy Inspector		Telugu
1992	Sanam Tere Hain Hum		
1992	Shola Aur Shabnam	"All Songs"	Hindi
1992	Tomar Naam Likhe Debo	"All Songs", Also Singer	Bengali
1992	Touhean	"All Songs"	Hindi
1992	Tyagi	"All Songs", Also Singer	Hindi
1992	Zindagi Ek Juaa	"All Songs"	Hindi
1993	Aag Ka Toofan		
1993	Aaj Kie Aurat		
1993	Aankhen	Highest-grossing Bollywood film of 1993	Hindi
1993	Ashik Priya		Bengali
1993	Bomb Blast		
1993	Dalaal	Also Singer	Hindi
1993	Dalaal		Bengali
1993	Geetanjali	"All Songs"	Hindi
1993	Izzat Ki Roti		
1993	Kundan		
1993	Nippu Ravva		Telugu
1993	Police Wala		Telugu
1993	Rowdy Rajakeeyam		Telugu
1993	Veertaa		
1994	Amaanat	"All Songs"	Hindi
1994	Andaz		
1994	Baali Umar Ko Salaam		
1994	Brahma		
1994	Dhushar Godhuli		Bengali
1994	Janta Ki Adalat		
1994	Juaari		
1994	Kotha Chhilo		Bengali
1994	Lal Pan Bibi		Bengali
1994	Mawali Raj		
1994	Mr. Azaad		
1994	Neelanjana	Also Singer	Bengali
1994	Parmatma		
1994	Phiriye Dao		Bengali
1994	Premyog		
1994	Protyaghat		Bengali
1994	Pyara Ka Rog		
1994	Rokto Nodir Dhara		Bengali
1994	Sadhna		
1994	Thanedaarni		
1994	Tomar Rakte Amar Shohag		Bengali
1995	Aatank Hi Aatank		
1995	Big Boss		Telugu
1995	Dil Ka Doctor		
1995	Diya Aur Toofan	"All Songs"	Hindi
1995	Hum Sab Chor Hain		Hindi
1995	Khaidi Inspector		Telugu
1995	Maindan-E-Jung		
1995	Muddayi Muddugumma		Telugu
1995	Police Wala Gunda		
1995	Punya Bhoomi Naa Desam		Telugu
1995	Rock Dancer	"All Songs", Also Singer	Hindi
1995	Saajan Ke Liye		
1995	Sangharsho		Bengali
1995	Zulm Ka Jawab		
1996	Agni Prem		
1996	Bal Bramhachari	"All Songs"	Hindi
1996	Hahakaar		
1996	Hum Hain Khalnayak		
1996	Jamaibabu		Bengali
1996	Maahir		
1996	Rangbaaz	"All Songs", Also Singer	Hindi
1996	Muqadama		
1996	Smuggler		
1997	Agnichakra		
1997	Ajker Sontan		Bengali
1997	Dharma Karma		
1997	Dil Ke Jharoke Main	"All Songs"	Hindi
1997	Do Aankhen Barah Haath		
1997	Gudgudee		
1997	Jodidar		
1997	Judge Mujrim		
1997	Nirnayak		
1997	Swami Keno Ashami		Bengali
1998	Bishnu Narayan		
1998	Jungle Lpve Story		
1998	Love Story 98		
1998	Manmohini		
1998	Military Raaj	"All Songs", Also Singer	Hindi
1998	Meyerao Manush		Bengali
1998	Nemok Haram		Bengali
1998	Seito Abar Kachhe Ele		Bengali
1998	Sher Khan		
1998	Yeh Hai Muqaddar Ka Sikandar		
1999	Aaya Toofan	Also Singer	Hindi
1999	Amar Bodhua		Bengali
1999	Benaam		Hindi
1999	Ganga Ki Kasam		
1999	Raja Aur Rangili		
1999	Shankar Shambu		
1999	Tomay Pabo Bole		
1999	Zimbo		

== 2000–2022 ==
Year	Film	Notes	Language
2000	Aaj Ka Nanha Farishta		
2000	Justice Chowdhary	"All Songs"	Hindi
2000	Sultaan		
2001	Guru Mahaguru		
2001	Main Hoon Qatil Jaadugarni		
2001	Meri Izzat Bachaao		
2002	Badmaash No. 1		
2002	Deva		Bengali
2002	Hum Tumhare Hain Sanam		
2002	Mulaqaat		
2002	Qaidi		
2002	Dangerous Night		
2002	Humein Tumse Pyaar Ho Gaya Chupke Chupke		
2003	Rakta Bandhan		
2004	Deshdrohi		Bengali
2004	Hawas		
2005	Classic Dance of Love		
2005	Laila – A Mystery		
2005	Mr. Prime Minister		
2005	Qatl-E-Aam		
2005	Topless		
2005	Vishwaas		
2006	Bold		
2006	Come December		
2006	Meri Majboori		
2006	Jaane Bhi Do Yaaron		
2007	Buddha Mar Gaya	Hindi	
2007	Dus Kahaniyan	Hindi	
2008	Aat Paake Bandha		Bengali
2008	Main Balwan		Hindi
2008	Shibaji		Bengali
2009	Aparadhi		Bengali
2009	Chandni Chowk to China		Hindi
2009	Geeta In Paradise		English (USA)
2009	Jai Veeru		Hindi
2009	Mudrank	Also Singer	Hindi
2009	Saptasur		Bengali
2009	Teree Sang		Hindi
2010	Apon Por		Bengali
2010	Bachao		Hindi
2010	Bejonma		Bengali
2010	Golmaal 3		Hindi
2010	Lashkar		Hindi
2010	Rahmat Ali		Bengali
2010	The Film Emotional Atyachar		Hindi
2010	Love.com		Hindi
2011	Love Me		Bengali
2011	Ragini MMS		Hindi
2011	The Dirty Picture		Hindi
2012	Bikram Singha		Bengali
2012	It's Rocking Dard-E-Disco		Hindi
2012	Om Shanti		Bengali
2013	A Political Murder		Bengali
2013	Action 3D	Co-composed with his son Bappa Lahiri	Telugu/Tamil
2013	Bang Bang Bangkok		Hindi
2013	Chand Pahari		Bengali
2013	Enemmy		Hindi
2013	Deewana Main Deewana		Hindi
2013	Himmatwala	uncredited	Hindi
2013	Latoo		Bengali
2013	Loafer		Bengali
2013	Swabhoomi		Bengali
2014	Main Aur Mr. Riight		Hindi
2014	Gunday		Hindi
2015	Ek Haadsa		Hindi
2015	Mumbai Can Dance Saala		Hindi
2016	Aman Ke Farishtey		Hindi
2017	Badrinath Ki Dulhania	Singer & Original Composer of "Tamma Tamma"	Hindi
2017	Hason Raja		Bengali
2017	Ittefaq	Original Composer of "Ittefaq Se"	Hindi
2017	Ram Ratan		Hindi
2018	3rd Eye		Hindi
2018	Chhui Mui	short film	Hindi
2018	Mausam Ikrar Ke Do Pal Pyaar Ke		Hindi
2018	Moner Majhe Tumi		Bengali
2019	Aham Brahmasmi		Sanskrit
2019	Why Cheat India	Original Music Director	Hindi
2019	Rocky: The Revenge		Tamil/Telugu
2020	Baaghi 3	Singer and original music director	Hindi
2020	Shubh Mangal Zyada Saavdhan	Singer and original music director	Hindi
2021	Om Shri Satya Sai Baba		Hindi/English
2021	Pyar Mein Thoda Twist		Hindi
2022	Mahanayakadu †		Telugu
2022	Aazad †		Malay
2022	Agreement-Ek Daastaan†		Hindi
2022	Azad†		Punjabi
2022	Veer Azad †		Marathi
2022	Veer Purush†		Gujarati
2022	Dhokha: Round D Corner	Hindi	Singer and original music director
