= Baaz (1992 film) =

- Promotional Poster
- Directed by: S.Subhash
- Produced by: S.G.Jethani
- Starring: Govinda; Sonam
- Music by: Anand–Milind
- Production company: Studio Link
- Release date: 6 November 1992
- Country: India
- Language: Hindi

Baaz is a 1992 Indian Hindi-language thriller drama film directed by S. Subhash, starring Govinda and Sonam. The film was a remake of Tamil film Jeeva (1988).

== Plot ==
Deva is a professional photographer. His life takes an unexpected turn when one of his model is killed. The killer asks for a diary but Deva is totally unaware about it. He tries to find out the killer and his motive.

== Cast ==
- Govinda as Deva
- Sonam
- Archana Puran Singh as Monica
- Tinnu Anand as Somnath
- Anjana Mumtaz
- Dalip Tahil
- Dinesh Hingoo
- Sudhir as Gogi

== Soundtrack ==
| Year | Song title | Singer |
|---|---|---|
| 1 | "Deewana Meri Jaan" | Amit Kumar, Kavita Krishnamurthy |
| 2 | "Peete Hai" | Sudesh Bhosle |
| 3 | "Meri Bholi" | Abhijeet Bhattacharya |
| 4 | "Resham Jaisa Rang" | Sapna Mukherjee |
| 5 | "Saat Sau Khidki" | Kavita Krishnamurthy |
