= Vijay (1988 film) =

- Promotional Poster
- Directed by: Yash Chopra
- Written by: Sachin Bhowmick; Akhtar ul Iman
- Produced by: Yash Chopra
- Starring: Rajesh Khanna; Hema Malini; Rishi Kapoor; Anil Kapoor; Meenakshi Sheshadri; Sonam; Saeed Jaffrey; Anupam Kher; Shakti Kapoor
- Cinematography: Manmohan Singh
- Music by: Shiv-Hari
- Production company: Yash Raj Films
- Distributed by: Yash Raj Films
- Release date: 12 August 1988
- Running time: 172 minutes
- Country: India
- Language: Hindi

Vijay (English: Victory) is a 1988 Indian Hindi-language action drama film directed by Yash Chopra. It features an ensemble star cast consisting of Rajesh Khanna, Hema Malini, Rishi Kapoor, Anil Kapoor, Meenakshi Sheshadri, Sonam, Anupam Kher in pivotal roles. Anupam Kher won the Filmfare Best Supporting Actor Award for his performance.

The film, released on 12 August 1988, to coincide with India's Independence Day weekend, was a commercial failure.

== Plot ==
Widowed Lala Yodhraj Bhalla lives in a palatial house with his daughter, Suman, and son, Shashiraj. Both of his children are of marriageable age. He gets a shock when he finds out that Suman is in love with a lowly employee by the name of Ajit Bhardwaj, and refuses to give his consent for their marriage. Suman and Ajit get married in a simple ceremony, and Suman moves to Ajit's house, where she soon gets pregnant and gives birth to a son who they name Vikram, affectionately called Vicky. Yodhraj gets another shock when Shashiraj tells him that he would like to marry Rita, who comes from a poor family. Yodhraj asks Shashiraj to go for a trip out of town in his private air-plane. With Shashiraj out of the way, Yodhraj goes to a pregnant Rita and asks her never to see Shashiraj again and leaves a blank cheque with her. The very same day, Shashiraj is killed when his plane crashes; a guilt-ridden Suman moves back into her father's house along with Vikram, leaving Ajit alone and devastated; and a lone Rita gives birth to a young son named Arjun. Twenty five years later, Yodhraj still lives in his palatial house with Suman and Vikram. A grown-up Arjun lives with his adopted father Inder Sen and his family. He meets and befriends Vikram but is completely unaware that they are cousins.

Sometime later, Inder tells Arjun about hiring an accomplished architect for their dream hotel, and that architect turns out to be Ajit, now alone and an alcoholic. He reluctantly agrees to work. Yodhraj is shocked to see him as Inder's company representative. He immediately leaves the meeting and meets up with Suresh Padampati owner of the Padampati Bankers, who also bears a grudge against Inder since his testimony resulted in his father committing suicide. They join hands, along with Inder's security officer Ujagar Singh who bears a grudge against Arjun for getting him arrested.

Situations worsen and it results in Arjun and Vikram becoming enemies, with it also creating a rift between their girlfriends Sapna and Nisha. Inder's company gets saddled with deep debt. In the middle of all of this Arjun gets to know that Rita is his biological mother and is still alive but sick, living in a convent. He goes to visit her. They have an emotional reunion but she dies in his arms thereafter. Inder tells him that Yodhraj is actually his grandfather, and apologises for making family members fight each other, but Arjun refuses to accept it, and pledges to take the fight forward. He, along with his friends, creates problems in Yodhraj and his family. Inder commits suicide due to the high pressure on him to pay the loan back, but Arjun succeeds in winning the elections and defeating Yodhraj. An enraged Vikram attacks Arjun with some hired goons and he is beaten up badly, but they flee when Ajit arrives on the spot. He takes him to the hospital. Ajit then goes to Suman and laments that Vikram had become like Yodhraj, someone who didn't care about humans. Vikram tells him to shut up, after which Suman slapped him. On the way out, Ajit is attacked by Suresh, who shoots him in the arm. Vikram suddenly gets angry and attacks him in retribution. He, along with Suman, both go to Ajit's house, where she tells him to quit drinking. Vikram laments that he grew up without his father around, and Ajit tells him that Yodhraj was the one responsible for their separation. After this, Vikram angrily lambasted Yodhraj for separating him from his father, and declares himself as Ajit's son. Arjun then calls Yodhraj and tells him that there is some other news which he himself will come to tell him. Yodhraj instructs Suresh to finish him off for good.

Sometime later, Arjun confronts Yodhraj and tells him that he is Shashiraj's son, and that he refuses to acknowledge him as his grandfather. He also invites him to the opening of his dream hotel. Arjun also meets a drunk Vikram and they become friends again. Yodhraj, shocked on hearing this, tries to stop Suresh from carrying out his plan, but fails to do so.

Suresh and his gang plant a bomb in the hotel, where the party is going on. By chance Nisha sees it and immediately informs Vikram and everyone, who start evacuating the place. Yodhraj too arrives, and tells Vikram that Arjun is his cousin. They, along with Ajit, begin searching for the bomb. They get a hold of Suresh and his gang, and a fight ensues. Arjun is successful in disarming the bomb.

Yodhraj asks Ajit and Arjun to forgive him for his wrongdoings. He realises that a person is known for his deeds, not by his family lineage. They live as a happy family forever.

== Cast ==
- Rajesh Khanna as Ajit Bharadwaj
- Hema Malini as Suman Bharadwaj
- Rishi Kapoor as Vikram Bharadwaj "Vicky"
  - Neil Nitin Mukesh as young Vikram Bhardwaj
- Anil Kapoor as Arjun Bhalla
  - Arjun Sablok as young Arjun Bhalla
- Meenakshi Sheshadri as Sapna
- Anupam Kher as Yodhraj Bhalla
- Raj Babbar as Shashiraj Bhalla (special appearance)
- Moushumi Chatterjee as Rita Bhalla (special appearance)
- Sonam as Nisha Mehra
- Saeed Jaffrey as Inder Gujral
- Anjana Mumtaz as Mrs. Inder Gujral
- Parikshit Sahni as Mr. Mehra
- Shakti Kapoor as Suresh
- Gulshan Grover as Ujaagar Singh
- Anant Mahadevan as Bank Manager
- Vikas Anand as Bank Manager
- Manmohan Krishna as Judge
- Bharat Bhushan as Church Pastor
- Anju Mahendru as Bela

== Soundtrack ==
The music was composed by Shiv Kumar Sharma and Hariprasad Chaurasia, known together as Shiv-Hari. The lyrics were written by Nida Fazli.

Song	Singer
"Meri Aankhen Hain"	Lata Mangeshkar
"Badal Pe Chalke Aa, Sawan Mein Dhalke Aa"	Lata Mangeshkar, Suresh Wadkar
"Zindagi Har Janam Pyar Ki Dastan, Kaisi Zameen, Kya Aasman, Tu Kahe To Badal Dun Jahan"	Lata Mangeshkar, Suresh Wadkar, Vinod Rathod
"Tera Karam Hi" (Male)	Mahendra Kapoor
"Tera Karam Hi" (Female)	Asha Bhosle
"Rakhna Athanni Sambhalke"	Asha Bhosle
"Akkad Bakkad Bambe Bo, Assi Nabbay Poore Sau"	Anupam Kher, Pooja Chopra
