= Manik Irani =

Indian film actor

- Born: Mumbai, India
- Other name: Billa
- Occupation: Actor

Manik Irani (also known as Billa) was an Indian actor, best known for playing villain roles in Bollywood films of the late 1980s and 1990s.

== Filmography ==
=== Hindi ===
Year	Film	Role
1974	Bidaai	Collage Goon
1974	Paap Aur Punya	
1975	Deewar	Rowdy Goon
1976	Kalicharan	Hitman (Madan Puri's son)
1978	Trishul	Goon
1978	Don	Don's Body Double (uncredited)
1978	Vishwanath	Taleb
1978	Atyachaar	Goon
1978	Ghata	Henchmen
1979	Mr. Natwarlal	Dumb Henchman
1980	Shaan	Shakal's Assistant
1981	Silsila	Goon
1982	Aamne Samne	Havaldar
1982	Apmaan	Manka
1982	Johny I Love You	Goon
1982	Raksha	Francis
1982	Khush Naseeb	Goon
1983	Nastik	Goon
1983	Mangal Pandey	Ruffian in Pinto's Motel
1983	Hero	Billa
1984	Jhutha Sach	Daro
1984	Zameen Aasmaan (1984 film)	
1984	Laila	Hitman
1984	Duniya	Manik
1984	Sunny	Amrita's molester
1984	Awaaz	Gurunath, Police Informer
1984	Karishma	Jaggu (as Maneck Irani)
1984	Kasam Paida Karne Wale Ki	Ballu Dada
1985	Maa Kasam	Kalu
1985	Mard	Zybisko
1985	Geraftaar	Pandit Jagganath Prasad
1985	Bepanaah	Gungha
1985	Aandhi-Toofan	Balbir's henchman
1985	Karishma Kudrat Kaa	Rangaraj
1985	Mera Saathi	Goon
1985	Pataal Bhairavi	Bilkalma
1985	Phaansi Ke Baad	Montha
1985	Zulm Ka Badla	Sangram's Victim
1985	Aaj Ka Daur	Jango
1986	Samundar	Manek
1986	Chhota Aadmi	Goon
1986	Kala Dhanda Goray Log	Henchman
1986	Jaan Ki Baazi	Ranga
1986	Amma	Chowrangee
1986	Karma	Goon
1986	Zindagani	Manek
1986	Muddat	Patthar Singh
1986	Ilzaam	Billa
1986	Aag Aur Shola	Jumbo
1986	Palay Khan	British Officer Tegh Ali Khan
1987	Sheela	
1987	Gulami Ki Zaanjeerein	Henchman
1987	Kaun Kitney Pani Mein	Goon
1987	Dadagiri	Raja Kaalia
1987	Dance Dance	Manek
1987	Insaaf	Raghu
1987	Marte Dam Tak	Goon
1987	Sadak Chhap	Billa
1987	Mard Ki Zabaan	Red Devil
1987	Himmat Aur Mehanat	Trilok Chand's Goon
1988	Soorma Bhopali	Local Goon
1988	Zulm Ko Jala Doonga	
1988	Halaal Ki Kamai	Fuga
1988	Paap Ko Jalaa Kar Raakh Kar Doonga	Raaka
1988	Commando	Chief Security Officer
1988	Ram-Avtar	Marconi
1988	Jeete Hain Shaan Se	Gullu
1988	Mar Mitenge	Manglu
1988	Maar Dhaad	Jojo
1988	Baai Chali Saasriye (Rajasthani Movie)	Kaaliya
1988	Mera Shikar	Street Goon
1989	Toofan	Manglu
1989	Kanoon Ki Awaaz	Goon
1989	Sachai Ki Taqat	Goon
1989	Hisaab Khoon Ka	Kidnapper
1989	Khoj	Goon at Dhaba
1989	Dana Paani	Zorro
1989	Ilaaka	Ustaad
1989	Aakhri Baazi	Jaagavar
1989	Purani Haveli	Monster
1989	Dav Pech	Sampat
1989	Love Love Love	Goon
1989	Zakhm	Goon
1989	Ustaad	Peter
1989	Tujhe Nahin Chhodunga	Henchman
1989	Sindoor Aur Bandook	Street Goon
1989	Kasam Vardi Ki	Heera
1990	Zimmedaaar	Indian Army Soldier
1990	Amavas Ki Raat	Goon
1990	Chor Pe Mor	Shambhu Dada
1990	Hum Se Na Takrana	Henchman
1990	Naaka Bandi	Goon
1990	Baap Numbri Beta Dus Numbri	Kolhapuri Dada
1990	Taqdeer Ka Tamasha	Bheema
1990	Roti Ki Keemat	Goon
1990	Shandaar	Goon
1990	Andher Gardi	Goon
1990	Ab Badla Main Loongi	Goon
1990	Maut Se Muqabla	Goon
1991	Farishtay	Chedhi Ram (as Manek Irani)
1991	Ajooba	
1991	Saugandh	Killer
1991	Khilaaf	Goon
1991	Fateh	Henchman
1991	Mast Kalandar	Goon
1991	Trinetra	Singhania's assistant
1991	Ajooba Kudrat Ka	Goon
1991	Khatra	Manik Bhaai
1991	Taqdeer Ka Rang	Goon
1991	Pratikar	Billa (Rapist)
1991	Shanti Kranti	Daddy's henchman
1992	Deedar	Batli Dada
1992	Jungle Ka Beta	Gora
1996	Talaashi	Usman
2001	Badla Aurat Ka	Janga Dada (Delayed Film)

=== Telugu ===
Year	Film	Role
1985	Adavi Donga	Rudraiah
1986	Vikram	Koti
1986	Tandra Paparayudu	Prachandudu
1986	Kirathakudu	Fighter in the ring
1987	Chakravarthy	Goon from Bombay
1987	Bharatamlo Arjunudu	Tiger
1987	Allari Krishnayya	Jimbo
1988	Dharma Teja	Sher Khan
1988	Trinetrudu	DD's Henchman
1988	Khaidi No. 786	Puliraju
1990	Kondaveeti Donga	
1990	Dharma	
1990	Raja Vikramarka	Billa
1991	Kshana Kshanam	Nayar gang member

=== Other language films ===
Year	Film	Role	Language
1982	Sangili	Hukum Singh	Tamil
1985	Jeevante Jeevan		Malayalam
1986	Africadalli Sheela	Abdul	Kannada
1987	Athiratha Maharatha	Kidnapper	Kannada
1990	Athisaya Piravi		Tamil
1990	Iyer The Great		Malayalam
1991	Nattukku Oru Nallavan		Tamil
