= Janam Se Pehle =

- Directed by: B. R. Ishara
- Produced by: M. Jayarami Reddy
- Starring: Raj Babbar; Farah
- Cinematography: Hussain Sheikh
- Edited by: A.I. Kunnu
- Music by: R. D. Burman
- Production company: J. R. Films
- Release date: 11 March 1994
- Country: India
- Language: Hindi

Janam Se Pehle (transl. Before birth) is a 1994 Indian Bollywood thriller drama film directed by B. R. Ishara. It stars Raj Babbar and Farah in pivotal roles.

== Plot ==
Geeta is the defense lawyer of Kishan Puncha in a murder trial. Geeta realises that Kishan committed three murders due to some unknown fact which relates with his birth. Geeta started her investigation to know the past of the accused.

== Cast ==
- Raj Babbar as Kishanlal Puncha
- Farah as Geeta Bhardwaj
- Sumeet Saigal as Ramesh Desai
- Swapna as Radha
- Shafi Inamdar as Dr. Verma
- Sadashiv Amrapurkar as Judge Vishwanath Mahajan / Mahendra Nath Mahajan
- Viju Khote as Spy Teerathram
- Brahmachari as Dr. Amarnath Sippy
- Deepak Qazir as Magistrate Govindram
- Gajendra Chauhan
- Mahavir Shah as Arvind Desai, Ramesh's father

== Soundtrack ==
Song	Singer
"Aa Bhi Ja"	Babla Mehta
"Tu Jane Na"	Jolly Mukherjee
"Koi Jhankar Hai, Naghma Hai, Sada Hai, Kya Hai"	Amit Kumar, Suresh Wadkar
"Pareshan Ho Tum"	Suresh Wadkar
"Ae Mere Humsafar"	Asha Bhosle
