= Dan Dhanoa =

Indian actor, model and sailor (born 1959)

- Born: Inderpreet Singh Dhanoa; 28 February 1959 (age 67); Chandigarh
- Occupations: Model; Film actor Sailor
- Years active: 1985–1997; 2020; 2024
- Spouse(s): Nikii Waalia (m. 1986; div. 2005) Nandita Puri (m. 2007)

Dan Dhanoa (born Inderpreet Singh Dhanoa; 28 February 1959) is an Indian former film actor and a sailor (master mariner) in the Merchant Navy.

He is known mostly for portraying villainous roles in Hindi cinema in the 1980s and 1990s, in about 100 films, such as Mard (1984), Karma (1986), Tridev (1989), Sanam Bewafa (1991) and Vishwatma (1992).

He was brought into the film industry by actor/director Feroz Khan, but made his debut in the Manmohan Desai film Mard.

== Personal life ==
He was born into a Sikh Jat family to Major General Sardar Singh , an army officer, and Capt. Dr. Paramjit Kaur, a doctor in the army.

In 1986, he was first married to Nikii Waalia. Their son Gobind Singh Dhanoa (a.k.a. Tarzan) was born in 1987. Tarzan is a Cinematographer by profession.

Later in 2007, he married an actor and classical dancer (Kathak from Jaipur Gharana), Nandita Puri.

He is an alumnus of The Doon School in Dehradun (1974 batch). An avid traveller, he is now settled in Chandigarh where he indulges in his passion for gardening, collecting art & artifacts.

== Filmography ==
Year	Film	Role	Notes
1985	Mard	Danny Dyer	
1985	Jaan Ki Baazi	Kundan	
1986	Sasti Dulhan Mahenga Dulha	Johnny Seth	
1986	Karma	Indian Army officer in BSO's prison	
1986	Dahleez		
1987	Watan Ke Rakhwale	Naresh R. Puri	
1987	Param Dharam		
1987	Apne Apne	Sudhir	
1987	Abhishek		Video
1987	Dacait	Badri Singh	
1987	Awam	Dayal	
1988	Shahenshah		
1988	Zalzala	Moti Singh	
1988	Mardangi	Shamsher Singh	
1988	Laal Dupatta Malmal Ka	Badri	
1988	Mandhi Shagana Di		Punjabi film
1988	Woh Phir Aayegi		
1989	Dost Garibon Ka	Dan	
1989	Apna Desh Paraye Log	Ranga	
1989	Ghabrahat		
1989	Abhimanyu		
1989	Tridev		
1989	Gola Barood	Jack	
1989	Shehzaade	Roshan Singh's Son	
1989	Sachché Ká Bol-Bálá	Billo	
1990	Andher Gardi		
1990	Sheshnaag		
1990	Shera Shamshera		
1990	Amiri Garibi	Jaggu	
1990	Paap Ki Kamaee	Mac	
1990	Chor Pe Mor	Moti	
1990	Shubhayathra		Malayalam film
1991	Trinetra	Singhania's assistant	
1991	Sanam Bewafa	Shaukat Khan	
1991	Phool Aur Kaante	Drug Dealer	
1991	Izzat		
1992	Virodhi	Sub-Inspector	
1992	Naseebwaala	Rocky (Casino Manager)	
1992	Vishwatma	Majhla Nilu	
1992	Qaid Mein Hai Bulbul		
1992	Jungle Ka Beta		
1992	Kamsin		
1992	Tahalka	Jelu	
1992	Kis Main Kitna Hai Dum		
1992	Aaj Ka Goonda Raj	Police Inspector	
1992	Deedar	Chhadha	
1992	Apradhi	Baadshah	
1993	Izzat Ki Roti	Babu Harami	
1993	Lootere		
1994	Chauraha	Snaky	
1996	Ajay	Roopesh's Friend	
1997	Dharma Karma		
2020	Soorarai Pottru	Vimal Balaiyya	Tamil film
2024	Sarfira	Walia	
