= Mahavir Shah =

Indian actor

Personal details
- Born: 5 April 1960 Bombay, Bombay State, India
- Died: 31 August 2000 (aged 40) Chicago, Illinois, U.S.
- Cause of death: Car crash
- Spouse: Chetna Shah
- Children: 2

Mahavir Shah (5 April 1960 – 31 August 2000) was a noted Indian television and stage actor who worked in Hindi and Gujarati movies. He is remembered for portraying several villainous roles. He died in a car crash in 2000, when he was in the United States during a two-month holiday tour.

== Life ==
Shah was born on 5 April 1960 in Bombay (now Mumbai). He gained interest in acting since his childhood. Mahavir worked in Hindi and Gujrati movies, TV shows. He was born into a Gujarati Hindu family. He was mainly known for his work in Police Aur Mujrim (1992), Baadshah (1999), and Yes Boss (1997). He married Chetna Shah. The couple has one daughter and one son. He was primarily known for his work as villainous characters. He started his career as a stage actor and worked in several plays. He made his Hindi movie debut with Ab Kya Hoga (1977). He made his TV debut with Zee Horror Show (1993-2001). Mahavir often depicts as cop or a lawyer. Although, He played minor characters But because of his talent these roles bring him recognition. Mahavir Shah worked in more than 86 movies and 2 TV shows. Aaj Ka Andha Kanoon (2003) was his last accredited movie, released posthumously . On 31 August 2000, while he was on a tour in the US along with his wife, son, and daughter in Chicago, United States their car collided with another car. Luckily all four (Mahavir, his wife, daughter and son) survived but when Mahavir came out of the car he was run over by another car plying on the road resulting in his death.

== Death ==
On 31 August 2000, when Shah was in the U.S. during his two-month holiday tour, he died in a car crash. He is remembered for his several villainous roles and his TV shows.

== Selected filmography ==
- 1976: Bhala Manus as Candidate Arvind Gautam
- 1977: Ab Kya Hoga as Driver
- 1978: Jhoota Kahin Ka as the mechanic Arvind Kaushik
- 1981: Harjaee as Ajay's friend
- 1982: Gandhi as Police Constable Arvind Mishra (Cameo Appearance) (uncredited)
- 1983: Be Aabroo as Arvind Ghorpade
- 1983: Sampoorna Mahabharat as Guest Arvind Anand at Draupadi's Swayamvar
- 1983: Aao Pyaar Karen as Arvind Mehra
- 1984: Bhavna as Balwant
- 1985: Yudh Defence Lawyer
- 1986: Badkaar as Arvind Godbole
- 1986: Ankush as Arvind Gupta
- 1987: Rajlakshmi as Rajkumar Arvind Pratap
- 1988: Khoon Bahaa Ganga Mein as Arvind Gaitonde
- 1988: Dayavan as Chokshi
- 1988: Tezaab as Inspector Gupta
- 1988: Aakhri Adaalat as Girdhar (Bansidhar's nephew)
- 1988: Paap Ka Anth as Vikram
- 1989: Khoon Bahaa Ganga Mein as Arvind Deshpande
- 1990: Prakope as Arvind Rajput
- 1990: Azaad Desh Ke Gulam as Vicky
- 1990: Police Public as Inspector Khera
- 1990: Chor Pe Mor as Arvind Patel
- 1990: Thanedaar as Killer
- 1990: Baaghi: A Rebel for Love as Balbir (uncredited)
- 1990: Apmaan Ki Aag as Inspector Damodar
- 1990: Zakhmi Zameen as Chotey Thakur Arvind Das
- 1990: Mera Pati Sirf Mera Hai as Prakash as M. Verma
- 1990: Ghar Ho To Aisa as Prince of Palghat
- 1991: Benaam Badsha as Inspector Satyaprakash Verma
- 1991: 100 Days as Mr. Mathur
- 1991: Banjaran as Thakur Mahavir Singh
- 1991: Jeevan Daata as Master Arvind Prakash
- 1991: Narasimha as Jailor Shinde
- 1991: Inspector as Dhanush
- 1992: Jawani Janeman as Arvind Agarwal
- 1992: Binani as Arvind Pandey
- 1992: Shola Aur Shabnam as Inspector Tiwari
- 1992: Humshakal as Mr. Ajay
- 1992: Tirangaa as Jailor Arvind Ahluwalia
- 1992: Police Aur Mujrim as Sanga
- 1993: Game as Peter D'Souza
- 1993: Kundan |Inspector Arvind Sawant
- 1993: Bhookamp as Mahesh Shah
- 1993: Shaktiman as Chootey
- 1993: Antim Nyay as Munna (as Mahaveer Shah)
- 1993: Phool Aur Angaar as Inspector Arvind Phadke
- 1993: Gurudev Mahavir as (Bhola's brother)
- 1993: Aadmi as Inspector Khare
- 1993: Pehchaan as Arvind Rampal Yogi's henchman
- 1993: Parwane as Drunkard Arvind Walia
- 1993: Zakhmo Ka Hisaab as Dhaneshwar's son
- 1993: Jeevan Ki Shatranj as Press Photographer
- 1993: Aankhen as Pravin Shah
- 1994: Aa Gale Lag Jaa as Truck driver Arvind Singh
- 1994: Zid as Sajju
- 1994: Raja Babu as Inspector (uncredited)
- 1994: Janam Se Pehle as Ramesh's Father
- 1994: Jai Kishen as Chhote Bhai
- 1994: Mr. Azaad as Police Inspector D.Lal (uncredited)
- 1995: Guneghar as Noorudin "Noora"
- 1995: Zakhmi Sipahi as Rajesh
- 1995: Coolie No. 1 as Gajendra's manager
- 1995: Aatank Hi Aatank as Aslam's Cousin
- 1995: Hum Dono as Surendra Nath Gupta
- 1995: Dushmani: A Violent Love Story as Inspector (uncredited)
- 1996: Mr. Bechara as Anita's Brother
- 1996: Sapoot as Kranti
- 1997: Ganga Maange Khoon as Arvind Das
- 1997: Judwaa as Inspector Sharma
- 1997: Yes Boss as Shukla
- 1997: Judge Mujrim as Defending Lawyer Arvind Vyas
- 1997: Bhai Bhai as Major Balwant (uncredited)
- 1998: Barood Ke Sholay as Arvind Rathod
- 1998: Saazish as Arvind Pradhan
- 1998: Vaettiya Madichu Kattu as Police officer in Mumbai
- 1998: Salaakhen as ACP Kamble
- 1998: Gharwali Baharwali as Arvind Raina
- 1998: Sar Utha Ke Jiyo as Arvind Rao
- 1998: Bade Miyan Chote Miyan as Zorawar's Client
- 1998: Mehndi as Ankush Chaudhary
- 1998: Hatya Kaand as Advocate
- 1999: Lo Main Aa Gaya as Arvind Khanna
- 1999: Kachche Dhaage as Advocate Chinoy
- 1999: Haseena Maan Jaayegi as Goa Police Inspector
- 1999: Baadshah as Police Officer
- 2000: Heerabai as Arvind Sinha
- 2000: Phir Bhi Dil Hai Hindustani as Madanlal Gupta
- 2000: Papa The Great as Police Inspector
- 2000: Bichhoo
- 2000: Tera Jadoo Chal Gayaa as Arvind Raote
- 2001: Jagira as Daku Arvind Singhania
- 2001: Kyo Kii... Main Jhuth Nahin Bolta as Public Prosecutor #2
- 2002: City Girl' S Hostel as Arvind Tripathi
- 2002: 23 March 1931 as Shaheed as Arvind Vohra
- 2002: Guru Mahaaguru as Arvind Yadav
- 2002: Ek Aur Visphot as D.S.P. Arvind Rastogi
- 2003: Aaj Ka Andha Kanoon as Shiva
- 2007: Aakheer (video) as Inspector Arvind Nagpal (final film role)

=== Television ===
Year	Show	Role	Channel	Notes
1993-2001	Zee Horror Show	Dhund, The Fog 1994 6 Episodes	Zee Tv	
1993-2001	Zee Horror Show	Gudiya 1995 7 Episodes	Zee Tv	
1993-2001	Zee Horror Show	Kabrastan 1995 6 Episodes	Zee Tv	Character-Mr Amar
1993-2001	Zee Horror Show	Vaapsi 1999 2 Episodes	Zee Tv	
1995	Dastaan	Mr Raj Tilak	Zee Tv	
1998	Suraag – The Clue	multiple roles	Doordarshan	
