= Sindoor Aur Bandook =

Bollywood film by Vinod Talwar

Sindoor Aur Bandook is a Hindi action romantic film of Bollywood directed by Vinod Talwar and produced by Anil Singh. This film was released on 22 November 1989 under the banner of Rajput Films Combines.

== Plot ==
The film revolves with the life of a rebel to the goal of revenge and bringing justice in the village against Mafia lord.

== Cast ==
- Hemant Birje
- Rita Bhaduri
- Sumeet Saigal
- Yunus Parvez
- Manik Irani
- Shiva Rindani
- Swapna
- Raj Kiran
- Firoz Irani
- Renu Arya
- Rajender Nath

== Soundtrack ==
The music direction is by Ajay Swami, and the lead singers are Anuradha Paudwal, Udit Narayan, Alka Yagnik, Kavita Krishnamurthy and Chandrani Mukherji.

1. "Jeet Gaya Dilwala" - Chandrani Mukherjee
2. "Meri Aankh Ka Ishara" - Kavita Krishnamurthy
3. "Tera Pyar Mujhe Kahan Liye Jaaye" - Udit Narayan, Alka Yagnik
4. "Teri Bandook Hai Souten Meri" - Anuradha Paudwal
