= Raiszaada =

- Promotional Poster
- Directed by: Bharat Kapoor
- Produced by: Pooja Kapoor
- Starring: Shashi Kapoor; Asha Parekh; Govinda; Sonam
- Music by: Bappi Lahiri
- Release date: 13 September 1991
- Country: India
- Language: Hindi

Raiszaada is a 1991 Indian Hindi-language film directed by Bharat Kapoor, starring Shashi Kapoor, Asha Parekh, Govinda, Sonam in lead roles.

== Cast ==
- Shashi Kapoor as Amar Singh
- Asha Parekh as Jyothi Singh
- Govinda as Sanjay Singh
- Sonam as Inspector Sonam
- Johnny Lever
- Gulshan Grover as Inspector Wafadaar Gupta
- Kulbhushan Kharbanda as Police Commissioner Durjan Singh
- Anupam Kher as Jagannath
- Bharat Bhushan as Judge
- Yunus Parvez as Hussain Chacha
- Pradeep Kumar as Barrister Kumar, Defence Counsel for Jagannath
- Dinesh Hingoo
- Aruna Irani as Havaldar
- Disco Shanti as Sonia
- Shiva Rindani as Munna Thakur
- Anil Dhawan as Surya Pratap Singh
- Aparajita as Kamini
- Beena Banerjee as Sheetal
- Arun Mathur as Justice Syed Mushtaq Ahmed

== Soundtrack ==
Lyrics: Indeevar

Song	Singer
"Nashe Ki Botal"	Shabbir Kumar, Asha Bhosle
"Pehle Aankh Lad Gayee"	Mohammed Aziz, Asha Bhosle
"Maa Ke Darbar Mein"	Mohammed Aziz, Chandrani Mukherjee
"Raiszaada, Raiszaada"	Mohammed Aziz
"Loot Liya, Loot Liya"	Naina Jairam, Sudesh Bhosle, Shail Chaturvedi, Dinesh Hingoo
"Jai Ambe, Jai Jagdambe"	Nirmala Devi
