= Raj Babbar =

Indian actor and politician (born 1952)

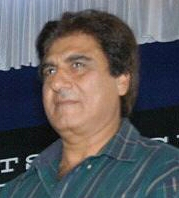
- Babbar in 2012

Member of Parliament, Rajya Sabha
- In office 14 March 2015 – 25 November 2020
- Preceded by: Manorama Dobriyal Sharma
- Succeeded by: Naresh Bansal
- Constituency: Uttarakhand
- In office 3 April 1994 – 6 October 1999
- Constituency: Uttar Pradesh

Member of Parliament, Lok Sabha
- In office 10 November 2009 – 16 May 2014
- Preceded by: Akhilesh Yadav
- Succeeded by: Akshay Yadav
- Constituency: Firozabad, Uttar Pradesh
- In office 6 October 1999 – 16 May 2009
- Preceded by: Bhagwan Shankar Rawat
- Succeeded by: Ram Shankar Katheria
- Constituency: Agra, Uttar Pradesh

President of Uttar Pradesh Congress Committee
- In office 12 July 2016 – 7 October 2019
- AICC President: Sonia Gandhi; Rahul Gandhi
- Preceded by: Nirmal Khatri
- Succeeded by: Ajay Kumar Lallu

Personal details
- Born: 23 June 1952 (age 74) Tundla, Uttar Pradesh, India
- Party: Indian National Congress
- Other political affiliations: Samajwadi Party; Janata Dal
- Spouses: Nadira Babbar (m. 1975); Smita Patil (m. 1983; died 1986)
- Children: Arya; Juhi; Prateik Smita Patil
- Relatives: See Babbar family
- Education: National School of Drama; Dr. Bhimrao Ambedkar University
- Profession: Actor; politician
- Years active: 1975–present

Raj Babbar (born 23 June 1952) is an Indian Hindi and Punjabi film actor and politician belonging to Indian National Congress. He is a three-time member of the Lok Sabha and a two-time member of the Rajya Sabha. He was the state President of Uttar Pradesh Congress Committee.

== Early life and education ==
Babbar was born in Agra, Uttar Pradesh, into a Punjabi Hindu family on 23 June 1952. His family had settled in Tundla after the partition of India. Their ancestral roots lie in Jalalpur Jattan, a city now located in the Gujrat District of Punjab in modern-day Pakistan.

He did his initial schooling from Mufid-E-Aam Inter college, Agra. He is an alumnus of the 1975 class of the National School of Drama (NSD) and graduate from Agra College.

== Acting career ==
=== Films ===
==== Hindi ====
He trained in the method school of acting at the NSD, which also involved street theatre. After training in New Delhi, he moved to Bombay and started his film career with Reena Roy, one of the most well-known actresses of the 1970s. He gained notoriety for his horrific portrayal of a rapist in B. R. Chopra's Insaf Ka Tarazu, in which he assaulted the heroine Bharti Saxena, played by Zeenat Aman and her sister Neeta, played by Padmini Kolhapure and in the end, is shot and killed by Bharti. He then became a consistent feature of the B. R. Chopra banner and appeared in Nikaah with Deepak Parashar and Salma Agha and in Aaj Ki Aawaz with Smita Patil.

==== Punjabi ====
He also achieved success in Punjabi cinema as he gave remarkable performances in Chann Pardesi (1980), Marhi Da Deeva (1989), and Long Da Lishkara (1983). He also appeared in the films like Aasra Pyar Da (1983), Mahaul Theek Hai (1999), Shaheed Uddham Singh (1999), Yaaran Naal Baharan (2005), Ek Jind Ek Jaan (2006), Apni Boli Apna Des (2009) and Tera Mera Ki Rishta (2009). He appeared in several films as a villain in Hindi-language films like Insaf Ka Tarazu (1980), Saazish (1988), Aankhen (1993), Dalaal (1993), The Gambler (1995), Andaz (1994), Yaarana (1995), Barsaat (1995), Ziddi (1997), Gundagardi (1997), Daag: The Fire (1999), Indian (2001).

=== Television series ===
He has also appeared on television. He appeared in the introductory episodes of the famous Indian TV series Mahabharat, as King Bharat, Bahadur Shah Zafar (1986) as Akbar, alongside debutant Juhi Chawla, and also in his home production; Maharaja Ranjit Singh (2010), all telecast on Doordarshan. In 2014 and 2015, he appeared in the serial telecast on Life OK; Pukaar - Call For The Hero, directed by Vipul Amrutlal Shah, with Rannvijay Singh, Adah Sharma and Shubhangi Latkar.

== Political career ==
Raj Babbar entered politics by joining Janata Dal in 1989, which was led by V. P. Singh.

From 1994 to 1999 he was a member of the Rajya Sabha. He was re-elected in the 14th Lok Sabha elections for his second term in 2004. He was suspended from Samajwadi Party in 2006. Later he joined Indian National Congress in 2008 and was elected for his fourth term as Member of Parliament in 2009, by defeating Dimple Yadav, wife of Akhilesh Yadav and daughter-in-law of Mulayam Singh Yadav. In the 2014 Lok Sabha elections, he contested from Ghaziabad and lost to General V. K. Singh. He was appointed as the president of Uttar Pradesh congress committee (UPCC), but in 2019 elections he couldn't even manage to save his own seat and lost to Rajkumar Chahar of the Bharatiya Janata Party by a huge margin of 4,95,065 votes.

Raj Babbar, in the capacity of Congress spokesman, created controversy in 2013, by stating that Rs.12 is sufficient for a common man to get a full meal in Mumbai, which drew severe criticism. He also said that a poor person in India can get full meals two times a day, within Rs. 28 to 32 and opposition parties termed Raj Babbar's statement laughable. Later, he regretted his comments. In July 2013, he compared Narendra Modi to Adolf Hitler, which also created controversy.

In the 2024 Indian general election, Raj Babbar contested from the Gurgaon Lok Sabha constituency on Indian National Congress ticket. In a tight contest, Bharatiya Janata Party (BJP) candidate and Union Minister Rao Inderjit Singh registered his fourth straight win from the Gurgaon Lok Sabha constituency, defeating Raj Babbar by 75,079 votes.

== Personal life ==
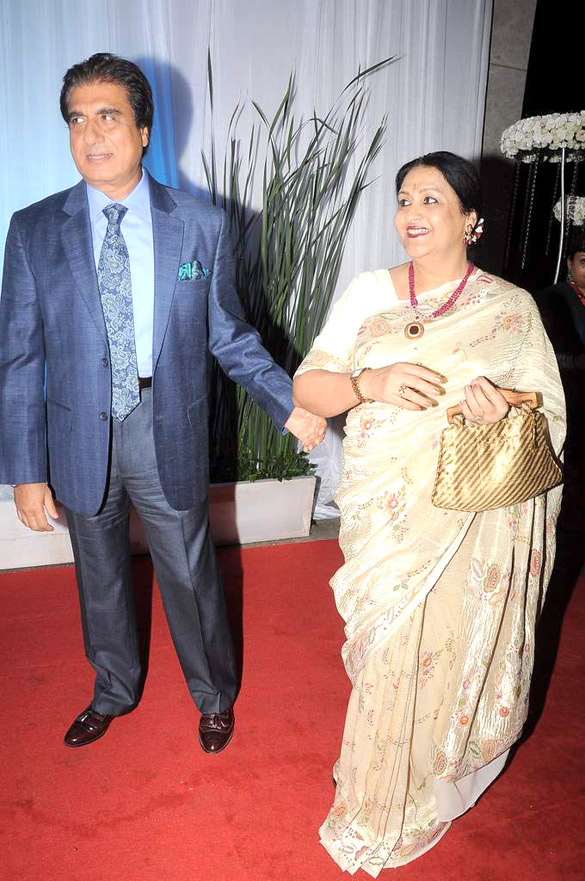
Raj with wife Nadira, July 2012

He is married to Nadira Zaheer, daughter of noted progressive Urdu writer Sajjad Zaheer. The couple have two children together; a son named Arya Babbar and a daughter named Juhi Babbar. He was also married to actress Smita Patil from 1983 to her death in 1986, with whom he has a son named Prateik Babbar.

He has two younger brothers, Kishan and Vinod (deceased) and four younger sisters. Babbar's niece Kajri Babbar is an upcoming filmmaker.

He launched his home production, Babbar Films Pvt. Ltd., along with his brother Kishan. Under it, he has produced two films, Karm Yodha (1992) and Kash Aap Hamare Hote (2003), and also the TV serial Maharaja Ranjit Singh (2010).

== Awards and nominations ==
- 1981: Nominated: Filmfare Award for Best Actor for Insaf Ka Tarazu
- 1984: Nominated: Filmfare Award for Best Supporting Actor for Agar Tum Na Hote
- 1985: Nominated: Filmfare Award for Best Actor for Aaj Ki Awaaz
- 1994: Nominated: Filmfare Award for Best Performance in a Negative Role for Dalaal
- 1996: Nominated: Filmfare Award for Best Performance in a Negative Role for Yaraana

== Filmography ==
=== Films ===
Year	Film	Role	Note
1978	Kissa Kursi Ka	Raj	
1980	Aap To Aise Na The	Vijay	
1980	Jazbaat	Inspector Kumar	
1980	Sau Din Saas Ke	Prakash	
1980	Nazrana Pyar Ka	Shankar	
1980	Chann Pardesi	Laali	Punjabi film
1980	Insaf Ka Tarazu	Ramesh Gupta	
1980	Hum Paanch	Arjun	
1980	Jwalamukhi	Inspector Rakesh	
1980	Saajan Mere Main Saajan Ki	Raj	
1981	Kalyug	Dharam Raj	
1981	Raaz	Kumar Chandrapaal Singh	
1981	Poonam	Chander	
1981	Prem Geet	Akash Bharadwaj/Nishant	
1981	Sharda	Suryakant	
1981	Yeh Rishta Na Toote	Shyam Saxena	
1981	Umrao Jaan	Faiz Ali	
1981	Tajurba	Akad	
1981	Armaan	Bar Owner Raj	
1981	Aapas Ki Baat	Anand Kumar Srivastav	
1981	Chann Pardesee	Laali Singh	
1982	Dulha Bikta Hai	Deepak Walia	
1982	Daulat	Sushil	
1982	Bheegi Palkein	Ishwar	
1982	Jeevan Dhaara	Ashok Kumar Srivastav	
1982	Lakshmi	Vijay Singh/Ajay Singh	
1982	Nikaah	Afaque Haidar	
1983	Arpan	JK	
1983	Agar Tum Na Hote	Raj Bedi	
1983	Achha Bura	Ravi Lala	
1983	Aasra Pyar Da	Suraj	Punjabi film
1983	Main Awara Hoon	Rajeev Kumar	
1983	Mazdoor	Ashok Mathur	
1983	Durdesh	Raju	
1983	Rang Birangi	Himself	Guest appearance
1983	Kalka	Hariya	
1983	Long Da Lishkara	Raja	Punjabi film
1983	Mehndi	Ajit Singh	
1983	Naukar Biwi Ka	Prabhat Kumar	
1983	Paanchwin Manzil	Raj	
1983	Rishta Kagaz Ka	Arun Sharma	
1984	Aaj Ki Awaaz	Professor Prabhat Kumar Verma/Robinhood	
1984	Anand Aur Anand	Pratap Singh, Union Leader	
1984	Inteha	Raj Bahadur	
1984	Jeene Nahi Doonga	Badal	
1984	Kanoon Meri Mutthi Mein	Vijay	
1984	Maati Maangey Khoon	Balraj Singh	
1984	Pet Pyar Aur Paap	Raj	
1984	Khatron Ke Khiladi		
1984	Sheeshay Ka Ghar		
1984	Shapath	Inspector Vijay	
1984	Hum Do Hamare Do	Anil/Jagadish	
1985	Jhoothi	Dr. Anil	
1985	Ek Chitthi Pyar Bhari	Dr. Sunil Sharma	
1985	Salma	Nawabzada Aslam / Raj Lakhnauvi	
1985	Haqeeqat	Amar	
1985	Jawaab	Thakur Ram Pratap Singh	
1985	Aitbaar	Jaideep	
1985	Yaar Kasam	Raja	
1985	Rusvai		
1985	Durgaa	Sunil Narayan	
1985	Maha Shaktimaan	Rajkumar Ajay Singh	
1985	Meraa Ghar Mere Bachche	Balwant Bhargav/ Arun Bhargav	Double Role
1985	Lava	Ajit Verma	
1985	Ulta Seedha	Ramesh Saxena	
1986	Angaarey	Inspector Vijay	
1986	Teesra Kinara		
1986	Baat Ban Jaye	Vijay	
1986	Dahleez	Colonel Rahul Saxena	
1986	Insaaf Ki Awaaz	Chandrashekhar Azaad	
1986	Raat Ke Baad	Himself	Guest appearance
1986	Kirayadar	Anil Choudhury	
1986	Suhagan	Murli	
1987	Awam	Rafiq Jafri	
1987	Insaniyat Ke Dushman	Ajay Verma	
1987	Jaan Hatheli Pe	Inspector Khan	
1987	Mirch Masala	Sonbai's husband	Guest appearance
1987	Muqaddar Ka Faisla	Raj	
1987	Aaj	Press Editor Raj	
1987	Daraar		
1987	Husn De Hulare	Himself	Punjabi film; Special appearance
1987	Ahsaan		
1987	Sansar	Vijay Kumar Sharma	
1988	Andha Yudh	Raja	
1988	Hum Farishte Nahin	Raja	
1988	Aurat Teri Yehi Kahani	Satyavan 'Sathu'	
1988	Kabzaa	Ranjit Verma	
1988	Kanwarlal	Minister Suraj Prakash	
1988	Mahaveera	Inspector Deepak Kissan	
1988	Mera Muqaddar	Himself	Guest appearance
1988	Rama O Rama	Monu/Sandeep	
1988	Vijay	Shashiraj Bhalla	Special appearance
1988	Saazish	Prakash	
1988	Waaris	Binder	
1988	Libaas	TK	
1988	Zakhmi Aurat	Suraj Prakash	
1988	Ganga Tere Desh Mein	Police Inspector Amar	
1988	Paanch Fauladi	Raja, Faulaadi 2	
1988	Akarshan	Himself	Special appearance
1988	Namumkin	Sunil Kapoor	
1989	Asmaan Se Ooncha	DSP Ranjeet Mallik	
1989	Marhi Da Deeva	Jagseer 'Jagsaa'	Punjabi film
1989	Aakhri Ghulam	Kumar	
1989	Touhean	Dr. Sharad	
1989	Mamta Ki Chhaon Mein	Sohanlal Saxena	
1989	Mahaadev	Kishan	
1989	Hisaab Khoon Ka	Rajesh	
1989	Hum Bhi Insaan Hain	Shankar	
1989	Paraya Ghar	Dr. Ramesh	
1989	Sindoor Ki Awaaz		
1989	Do Yaar		
1989	Mohabat Ka Paigham	Nadeem Rahman	
1989	Suryaa: An Awakening	Inspector Iqbal Khan	
1989	Jaaydaad	Rajesh Srivastav	
1989	Mirza Ki Shaadi	Aslam	
1990	Amiri Garibi	Rajesh	
1990	Agneekaal	SP Jagadish Zanjeerwala	
1990	Kanoon Ki Zanjeer	Kishore	
1990	Aaj Ke Shahenshah	Barsaati	
1990	Shera Shamshera	Shivkumar Singh	
1990	Ghayal	Ashok Mehra	
1990	Andher Gardi	Inspector Avinash	
1990	Shadyantra	Inspector Raj Diwakar	
1990	Qurbani Jatt Di	Jagroop	Punjabi film
1991	Gunehgar Kaun	Vinod Saxena	
1991	Dharam Sankat	Police Officer Gopal	
1991	Inspector Kiron		
1991	Swarg Jaisaa Ghar	Raj	
1991	Kasam Kali Ki	Vijay	
1992	Anutap		Bengali film
1992	Karm Yodha	Sameer	
1992	Aaj Ka Goonda Raaj	Ravi	
1992	Ye Hai Ghar Ki Mahabharata	Ramesh	
1992	Waqt Ka Badshah	Jacky	Special appearance
1992	Kal Ki Awaz	Minister Syed Nooruddin Ahmed	
1993	Sadhna	Bipin	
1993	Rudaali	Thakur Laxman Singh	
1993	Gardish	Pratap	
1993	Badi Bahen	Vijay Dwarkaprasad	
1993	Dalaal	Jagganath Tripathi	
1993	Aankhen	Chief Minister & Sarang	Double role
1993	Aulad Ke Dushman	Jai Kumar	
1993	Maya Memsaab	Rudra Pratap Singh	
1993	Bonny	Himself	Guest appearance
1994	Nasibo	Naajar Singh	Punjabi film
1994	Mr. Azaad	Satyaprakash	
1994	Andaz	Captain	
1994	Janam Se Pehle	Kishanlal Punchcha	
1994	Dalaal	Jaggannath Tripathi	
1994	Rakhwale	Himself	Guest appearance
1994	Saboot Mangta Hain Kanoon	Ashwini	
1994	Ucha Pind	Succha	Punjabi film
1994	Do Fantoosh	Veerendra Kumar	
1995	God and Gun	Police Commissioner Avtaar Singh	
1995	Sarhad: The Border of Crime	Prakash Mathur	
1995	Sir Dhad Di Baazi	Himself	Guest appearance
1995	The Gambler	Jaichand	
1995	Fauji	Arjun B. Sinha	
1995	Barsaat	Dinesh Oberoi	
1995	Yaraana	JB/ Inspector Pradhan	
1996	Maahir	Jabbar Khan (JK)	
1996	Yeh Majhdhaar	Mohan	
1996	Sautela Bhai	Advocate Rajaram	
1996	Kalinga		Unreleased film
1996	Hukumnama		
1996	Gehra Raaz	Kumar Bahadur	
1997	Gupt: The Hidden Truth	Governor Jaisingh Sinha	
1997	Gundragardi	Kalicharan	
1997	Itihaas	Thakur Digvijay Singh	
1997	Qahar	Police Commissioner Kapoor	
1997	Ziddi	Jindal	
1998	Achanak	Himself	Cameo appearance
1998	Maharaja	Ali	
1998	Prem Aggan	Captain Veer Bahadur Singh	
1999	Daag: The Fire	Tejeshwar Singhal	
1999	Shaheed Uddham Singh	Sardar Udham Singh Kamboj	Punjabi film
1999	Mahaul Theek Hai	Inderjit Rai	Punjabi film
2000	Baaghi	Raj	
2000	Aaj Ka Nanha Farishta	Inspector Ashok R. Singh	
2000	Aakhir Kaun Thi Woh?	Raj	
2001	Indian	DGP Surya Pratap Singh	
2001	Chhupa Rustam: A Musical Thriller	Super Intendent of Police, Bhim Thappa	
2001	Censor	Public Prosecutor	
2001	Ek Aur Jung		
2002	Kyaa Dil Ne Kahaa	Esha's father	
2002	The Legend of Bhagat Singh	Kishan Singh Sandhu	
2002	Jaani Dushman: Ek Anokhi Kahani	Principal Joseph	
2003	LOC Kargil	Col. Khushal Thakur, CO, 18 Grenadiers	
2003	Talaash: The Hunt Begins	Rajoo Singh	
2003	Kash Aap Hamare Hote	Sardar Teja Singh Brar	
2004	Police Force: An Inside Story	Ratan Sethi	
2004	Bhola in Bollywood	Himself	Cameo appearance
2004	Sheen	Pandit Amarnath	
2004	Shikaar	ACP Sumed Singh	
2005	Bunty Aur Babli	T. T. Chandra P. Trivedi, Bunty's father	
2005	Haseena: Smart, Sexy, Dangerous		
2005	Yaaran Naal Baharran	Major Balwinder Singh	Punjabi film
2006	Corporate	Dharmesh Marwah	
2006	Ek Jind Ek Jaan	Sukhdev "Sukha" Singh	Punjabi film
2006	Babul Pyaare		
2006	Dil Toh Deewana Hai	Himself	Cameo appearance; Unreleased film
2006	Banaras	Mahendra Nath	
2007	Aap Kaa Surroor: The Movie	Feroz Merchant	
2007	Sirf Romance: Love by Chance	Rguveer Pratap Singh	
2008	Karzzz	G.G. Oberoi	
2008	Khushboo: The Fragraance of Love	Chairman Vishal Deep	
2008	Fashion	Shobhit Mathur	
2009	Tera Mera Ki Rishta	Varyam Singh	Punjabi film
2009	Hamara Parivar		
2009	First Time - Pehli Baar		
2009	Apni Boli Apna Des	Bikramjit Singh	Punjabi film
2010	Minsara Kadhali		
2010	Vijay - Winner All The Way		
2011	Bodyguard	Sartaj Rana	
2011	Force	Mahesh Singh Rajput IRS; Zonal director of NCB, Mumbai	
2012	Khiladi 786	Sattar Singh	
2013	Saheb, Biwi Aur Gangster Returns	Birendra Pratap	
2013	Rabba Main Kya Karoon	Choudhary Shebaar Karan Singh / Tauji	
2013	Dhuaan		
2013	Bullett Raja	Minister Ram Babu Shukla	
2014	Freedom		
2015	Tevar	S.P Ravikant Shukla	
2015	Karbonn		
2016	Force 2	Home Secretary of Intelligence Bureau Manish Singh Rajput	Cameo appearance
2016	Dil Toh Deewana Hai	Ashok	
2018	Ishqeria	Raghav's father	
2018	Sirf 5 Din	Tantrik	
2021	Bunty Aur Babli 2	Himself	Cameo appearance
2022	Bhoot Uncle Tusi Great Ho	Bhoot Uncle	Punjabi film
2022	Umran Ch Ki Rakheya	Pyare Lal	Punjabi film
2024	Shahkot		Punjabi film
2024	Mirg		
2024	Ek Kori Prem Katha	Thakur Ram Dev Singh	

=== Television ===
Year	Title	Role	Notes
1986	Bahadur Shah Zafar	Akbar	
1988–1990	Mahabharat	Bharata	
2010	Maharaja Ranjit Singh	Narrator	
2014–2015	Pukaar: Call For The Hero	Amarjeet	
2021	Dil Bekaraar	LN Thakur	
2023	Happy Family: Conditions Apply	Mansukhlal Dholakia	

Party political offices
Preceded by Nirmal Khatri	President; Uttar Pradesh Congress Committee; 12 July 2016 – 7 October 2019	Succeeded by Ajay Kumar Lallu
