= Gola Barood =

- Promotional poster
- Directed by: David Dhawan
- Written by: P. D. Mehra
- Produced by: Ravinder Dhanoa
- Starring: Shatrughan Sinha; Chunky Pandey; Kimi Katkar; Sonam
- Music by: Bappi Lahiri
- Release date: 8 September 1989
- Country: India
- Language: Hindi

Gola Barood is a 1989 Indian Hindi-language action film directed by David Dhawan, produced by Ravindra Dhanoa, starring Shatrughan Sinha and Chunky Pandey. The music was composed by Bappi Lahiri.

== Plot ==
Vijay is the son of a police officer, who detests the way his father treats hardcore criminals. One day he is attacked by criminals but is saved by Shambhu, an honest truck driver from nowhere. As time passes Shambhu becomes a dreaded criminal with a history of escaping prisons. Vijay takes interest in reforming criminals, and eventually becomes a Deputy Jailor and takes charge of Shambhu. Conflicts and emotions take place until one day Dabur, another villain, kidnaps Vijay's mother. Shambhu saves her and they become friends. But now Dabur kidnaps Shambhu's sister and asks Shambhu to rob the treasury. Shambhu has to rob the treasury to save his sister, and Vijay wants to stop him. Will Shambhu save his sister? Will Vijay stop the robbery? Or will Dabur succeed in his mission of evil?

== Cast ==
- Shatrughan Sinha as Shambhu
- Chunky Pandey as Vijay
- Kimi Katkar as Reena
- Sonam as Pickpocket Rekha
- Gulshan Grover as Vishraj
- Sadashiv Amrapurkar as Dabar
- Dalip Tahil as Tony
- Dan Dhanoa as Jack
- Jagdeep as Bus Conductor Hazarilal
- Pankaj Udhas as himself
- Om Shivpuri as Police Commissioner Ajit Kapoor
- Anil Dhawan as Police Inspector Naresh
- Shafi Inamdar as Jailor Vinod Sharma
- Sudhir Pandey as Inspector Mahendranath
- Anjana Mumtaz as Mrs. Mahendranath
- Asha sharma|Asha Sharma as Shambhu's Mother
- Kavita Thakurhn|Kavita Thakur as Guddi
- Sunil Dhawan as Shambhu's Maternal Uncle

== Songs ==
Song	Singer
"Dard-E-Dil Ka Mere"	Asha Bhosle
"Doli Uthegi Aaj Teri Bahena"	Mohammed Aziz
"Yaad Aayi, Yaad Aayi, Bhuli Woh Kahani Phir Yaad Aayi"	[Mohammed Aziz; Pankaj Udhas
"Mujhe Logon Samajhke Chor, Sipahi Mere Peechhe"	Mohammed Aziz; Alka Yagnik
"Shabba Shabba"	Alka Yagnik
