= Karm Yodha =

Karmyoddha
- Directed by: Dayal Nihalani
- Starring: Raj Babbar; Dimple Kapadia
- Music by: Ajit Varman
- Release date: 17 January 1992
- Country: India
- Language: Hindi

Karmyoddha (transl. "Duty Warrior" or "Action Warrior") is a 1992 Bollywood action film. It stars Raj Babbar, Dimple Kapadia in lead roles.

== Music ==
Nadira Babbar wrote all the songs.

1. Haye Ye Ladhkiya – Amit Kumar
2. Jhumpak Jhumpak Tara Ra Ram – Suresh Wadkar, Alka Yagnik
3. Uff Ye Kya Hua – Asha Bhosle, Mohammed Aziz
4. Ang Ang Mere Jadu Jage – Amit Kumar, Anuradha Paudwal
5. "Zara Sa Mujhe Chhua Toh" – Lata Mangeshkar, Amit Kumar
