= Apmaan Ki Aag =

Apmaan Ki Aag अपमान की आग
- Theatrical release poster
- Directed by: Talukdars
- Written by: Talukdars; Tanveer Khan (dialogue)
- Produced by: Vijay K. Ranglani
- Starring: Govinda; Sonam
- Cinematography: Munir Khan
- Edited by: Hussain A. Burmawala
- Music by: Nadeem-Shravan
- Release date: 21 December 1990
- Country: India
- Language: Hindi

Apmaan Ki Aag is a 1990 Indian Hindi-language action drama film directed by Talukdars and produced by Vijay K. Ranglani. It stars Govinda and Sonam in the lead roles.

== Plot ==
Living in a chawl in Dongri, Bombay, Vikrant Narayan Singh (Govinda) dreams of being wealthy, romances Mona (Sonam), the only child of a widower and retired Colonel Suryadev Singh (Kader Khan), and sends money to his village-based widowed mother. While celebrating Mona's birthday at Hotel Sea Princess, he is humiliated and assaulted by J.D. Chaudhary (Gulshan Grover) and Monty Nagpal (Satish Shah) and decides to file a police complaint. It is this decision that will not only change his life forever but also alienate him from Mona, as well as compel him to join the underworld headed by Monty's dad.

== Cast ==
- Govinda as Vikrant Narayan Singh "Vicky"
- Sonam as Mona Singh
- Kader Khan as Retired Colonel Suryadev Singh
- Aruna Irani as Mrs. Singh
- Satish Shah as Monty Nagpal
- Kiran Kumar as Kailash
- Gulshan Grover as J.D. Chaudhary
- Vikram Gokhale as Police Commissioner S.R. Chaudhary
- Rakesh Bedi as Vasu
- Dinesh Hingoo as Daruwala
- Mahavir Shah as Inspector Damodar
- Shagufta Ali as Shayri Teller Girl

== Soundtrack ==
The music was composed by Nadeem-Shravan.

Song	Singer
"Badli Badli Chal Hai"	Amit Kumar
"Dekh Phooljhadi"	Kumar Sanu
"Diya Diya Dil Diya, Tujhse Maine Pyar Kiya"	Mohammed Aziz, Anuradha Paudwal
"Aaj Pyar Ho Jane De, Aaj Pyar Ho Jane De"	Mohammed Aziz, Anuradha Paudwal
