= Chor Pe Mor =

- Directed by: Kapil Kapoor
- Written by: Sajeev Kapoor
- Produced by: Sanjay Shah
- Starring: Naseeruddin Shah; Neelam; Sonam
- Music by: R. D. Burman
- Release date: 6 July 1990
- Country: India
- Language: Hindi

Chor Pe Mor is a 1990 Indian crime comedy film directed by Kapil Kapoor, starring Naseeruddin Shah, Neelam and Sonam.

== Plot ==
Raja and Anthony are close friends struggling financially. Raja is an aspiring musician who falls in love with Ritu, a young woman from a wealthy family. However, Ritu's father, Seth Tijorimal, strongly opposes their relationship because of Raja's poverty.

Meanwhile, the criminal Dhanpat and his gang rob a bank. During the ensuing chaos, the stolen money is concealed, and Raja eventually discovers the cash without knowing its origins. His possession of the money draws him into a dangerous conflict.

When Dhanpat discovers that Raja has the stolen money, he becomes determined to retrieve it. At the same time, Inspector Chanakya, an honest and astute police officer, investigates the robbery. Raja consequently finds himself caught between Dhanpat and his gang, who want their money back, and the police, who are seeking to recover the stolen cash and bring the criminals to justice.

The situation escalates when Dhanpat kidnaps and kills Anthony, Raja's closest friend. He then abducts Ritu and threatens Raja, demanding the return of the stolen money. Raja must find a way to rescue Ritu while evading the criminals and dealing with the ongoing police investigation.

Ultimately, Raja and Inspector Chanakya pursue the same objective: rescuing Ritu and bringing Dhanpat to justice. They succeed in saving her, and Dhanpat is arrested.

== Cast ==
- Naseeruddin Shah as Inspector Chanakya
- Karan Shah as Raja
- Neelam Kothari as Ritu
- Sonam as Basanti
- Ashok Saraf as Anthony
- Satish Shah as Tijorimal
- Kiran Kumar as Dhanpat Indrajeet Garodia "D.I.G."
- Mayur Verma as Suraj Prakash "S.P."
- Dan Dhanoa as Moti
- Sharat Saxena as Suraj , S.P.'s henchman
- Manik Irani as Shambhu Dada
- Viju Khote as Jaggu
- Mahavir Shah as Drunkard Arvind Khanna
- Kamal Kapoor as Police Chief Hardayal
- Aruna Irani as Music Label executive Neeta

== Soundtrack ==
All lyrics heard in this film were written by Gulshan Bawra.

Song	Singer
"Woh Din Kab"	Asha Bhosle
"Baj Uthe Ghungroo"	Asha Bhosle, Amit Kumar
"Aur Sunao Kya Haal"	Asha Bhosle, Amit Kumar
"Chor Chor"	Shailendra Singh, Amit Kumar
"Hum To Pyar Mein"	Amit Kumar
