= Do Fantoosh =

- Directed by: Veerendra and Sikander Bharti
- Music by: Hari–Arjun
- Production company: Apna Films
- Release date: 1 July 1994
- Country: India
- Language: Hindi

Do Fantoosh is a 1994 Bollywood comedy film starring Amjad Khan, Shakti Kapoor in title roles, along with Raj Babbar, Sonam, directed by Veerendra and Sikander Bharti. The film started production in 1988 and was delayed after director Veerendra's death. Sikander Bharti stepped in to revive the film and complete it for release in 1994. The film is dedicated to Amjad Khan, who died two years before the film's release.

== Cast ==
- Amjad Khan as Bajrang
- Shakti Kapoor as Laxman
- Raj Babbar as Veerendra
- Sonam as Nimmo
- Sadashiv Amrapurkar as Shetty

== Soundtrack ==
The songs were composed by Hari–Arjun and penned by Sikandar Bharti.

#	Song title	Singer(s)
1	"Aaja Chhatri Ki Chhaon Mein"	Asha Bhosle, Shabbir Kumar
2	"Chaubara Tera Chhoda Na Jaaye"	Kavita Krishnamurthy
3	"Hum Do Deewane"	Asha Bhosle, Shabbir Kumar
4	"Meri Padosan Jawan Ho Gayi"	Alka Yagnik, Udit Narayan
5	"Teri Duniya Jalane Ko Ji Chahta Hai"	Mohammed Aziz, Udit Narayan
6	"Lai Lo Lai Lo Ji Paan"	Alka Yagnik, Amjad Khan
