= Viju Khote =

Indian actor (1941–2019)

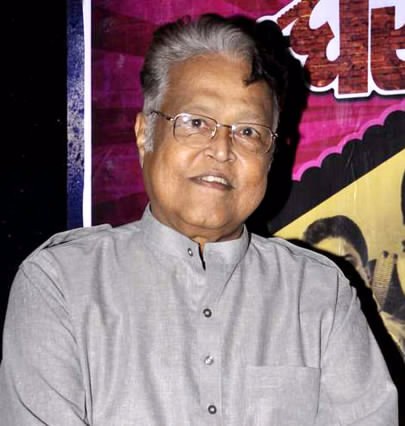
- Khote in June 2013
- Born: Vijay Bholanath Khote; 17 December 1941; Bombay, Bombay Province, British India
- Died: 30 September 2019 (aged 77); Mumbai, Maharashtra, India
- Occupation: Actor
- Family: Durga Khote (aunt); Shubha Khote (sister); Bhavana Balsavar (niece)

Viju Khote (17 December 1941 – 30 September 2019) was an Indian actor best known for his role as Kaalia, a dacoit in the 1975 film Sholay with the iconic dialogue, “Sardar, maine aapka namak khaya hai.” His career spanned six decades with more than 440 films in Hindi and Marathi cinema. He is also known for his role as Robert in the 1994 film Andaz Apna Apna with the dialogue, “Ghalti se mistake hogaya.” On television he was most remembered for his role in Zabaan Sambhalke (1993). He also acted in Marathi theatre over the years.

== Personal life ==
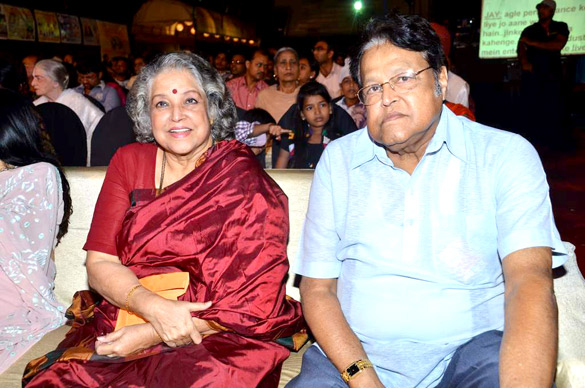
Viju Khote with his sister Shubha Khote

He was younger brother of actress Shubha Khote. Their father Nandu Khote was a noted stage actor and in silent movies, whose sister-in-law was actress Durga Khote.

Khote died on 30 September 2019 at his Mumbai home due to multiple organ failure at the age of 77.

== Selected filmography ==
Year	Title	Role	Notes
1964	Ya Malak		
1968	Anokhi Raat	Idle bandit	
1969	Jeene Ki Raah	Raghunandan - Sudha's prospective groom	
1970	Dagabaaz		
1970	Pagla Kahin Ka		
1970	Khilona	Johnson	
1970	Sachaa Jhutha		
1971	Paras	Munna Sarkar Friend	
1972	Bhai Ho To Aisa	Chandravadan	
1972	Raaste Kaa Patthar	Doctor	
1972	Raampur Ka Lakshman	Michael	
1973	Shareef Budmaash	Prisoner	
1973	Jalte Badan	Deshpande, College Student	
1974	Imaan	Truck Driver	
1974	Jurm Aur Sazaa		
1974	Insaaniyat	Circus employee	
1974	Roti	Doctor	
1974	Benaam		
1975	Sholay	Kaalia	
1976	Adalat		
1976	Tapasya	Gopi	
1976	Kalicharan	Hawaldaar Kishen	
1976	Charas	No.10, Sharp Shooter	
1977	Dulhan Wahi Jo Piya Man Bhaye.	Traffic Inspector	
1977	Jay Vejay	Randhir	
1977	Parvarish		
1978	Chakravyuha	Police Constable	
1978	Azaad	Stooge	
1979	Bhala Manus	Raja	
1980	Jazbaat	Sapna's Victim	
1980	Karz	Baiyan (Kabir's left)	
1980	Jal Mahal		
1980	Qurbani	Vikram's man	
1980	Be-Reham	Tiger	
1980	Shaan	Police Inspector	
1981	Naseeb	Rodgriues	
1981	Jyoti		
1981	Paanch Qaidi	Daku	
1982	Gopichand Jasoos	Taxi Driver of Goa	
1982	Ashanti	Francis	
1982	Insaan	Girdhar	
1982	Vidhaata		
1983	Kalka	CRO Camp Supervisor	
1983	Humse Na Jeeta Koi	Shakti Henchmen	
1983	Nastik	Munimji	
1983	Romance	Petty Thief	
1983	Achha Bura	Jaggu	
1983	Pukar	Kiran Bhandare	
1984	Hum Hain Lajawaab	Creditor	
1984	Jhutha Sach	Custom Officer (song "Loot Gayi")	
1984	Inquilaab	Blackmarketer, associate of Bhupathi	
1984	Ghar Ek Mandir		
1984	Sharaabi	Mr Nahata	
1984	Rakta Bandhan	Police Inspector	
1984	Phulwari	Horse-riding trainer	
1984	Andar Baahar	Bartender	
1984	Hum Hain Lajawaab		
1984	Karishmaa	Birju	
1985	Karm Yudh	Police Constable Aayaram	
1985	Haqeeqat	Hospital Ward Boy	
1985	Haveli	Kaushal Bharti	
1985	Pataal Bhairavi		
1985	Meri Jung	Arun Verma Assistant	
1985	Wafadaar	Master	
1985	Maa Kasam	Constable B A Talwar	
1986	Dilwaala	Grocer	
1986	Aag Aur Shola	Police Constable	
1986	Baat Ban Jaye	Dr. Dharam adhikari	
1986	Tan-Badan	Road-Rowdy Goon who loots the people for money	
1986	Aakhree Raasta	Amarnath	Senior Police Inspector
1986	Karma	Jailor	
1986	Ek Aur Sikander	Boga Seth	Jewellery Shop Owner
1986	Nagina	Singh	
1986	Naache Mayuri		
1986	Avinash	Superfast Detective	
1987	Dadagiri	Lakhanpal	
1987	Inaam Dus Hazaar	Kamraan	
1987	Naam O Nishan	Inspector Sharma	
1987	Satyamev Jayate	Police Constable Daboo	
1987	Sadak Chhap		
1988	Dariya Dil		
1988	Pyaar Ka Mandir	Compounder	
1988	Qayamat Se Qayamat Tak	Maan Singh	
1988	Kasam	South Indian Madrasi Smuggler	
1988	Kanwarlal	Ramprasad	
1988	Mar Mitenge	Police Constable P.K.Kale	
1988	Qatil	Red Rose Club announcer	
1989	Daata	Thief	
1989	Abhi To Main Jawan Hoon		
1989	Vardi	Toll Plaza Agent	
1989	Main Tera Dushman	Mental Hospital Doctor	
1989	Gair Kanooni	Police Inspector	
1989	Mujrim	Restaurant Manager	
1989	Na Insaafi	John D'Costa	
1989	Aakhri Ghulam	Munim	
1989	Elaan-E-Jung	Police Inspector Khote	
1989	Kala Bazaar		
1989	Kasam Vardi Ki	Police Constable Chiranjit	
1989	Paap Ka Ant		
1990	Khatarnaak	Hotel Owner	
1990	Baap Numbri Beta Dus Numbri	Prisoner	
1990	Pyar Ka Karz	Police Inspector Naik	
1990	Dil	Police Constable	
1990	Ghayal	Boxing coach	
1990	Kafan		
1990	Jawani Zindabad	Mr Pathak	
1990	Chor Pe Mor	Jaggu	
1990	Zimmedaaar	Goga Assistant	Diamond Stealer
1990	Thanedaar	Police Constable Sukhiram	
1990	Tejaa	Police Inspector	
1991	Hum	College Principal	
1991	Farishtay	CRF Soldier	
1991	Benaam Badsha	Hotel Security Guard	
1991	Afsana Pyar Ka	Gurumurthy	College Physics Prof
1991	Karz Chukana Hai	Gama Pahelwan	
1991	Do Matwale	Cottage Keeper	
1991	Pyar Hua Chori Chori	Police Constable Verma	
1991	Trinetra	Roshanlal	
1991	Dancer	Dhansukh Ghotale	Dance Competition Organiser
1991	Banjaran	Bujangji Maharaj	
1992	Geet Milan Ke Gaate Rahenge		
1992	Lambu Dada		Municipal Dog Catcher
1992	Sarphira	Joseph	
1992	Tyagi	Gabbar Singh	
1992	Deedar	Inspector Khadak Singh	
1992	Jeena Marna Tere Sang	College Principal Personal Assistant (PA)	
1992	Khule-Aam	Police Inspector	
1992	Kisme Kitna Hai Dum	Dharam Das	
1993	Pyar Pyar	College Professor	
1993	King Uncle	Jairam, Marriage Mediaitor	
1993	Dil Ki Baazi	Police Constable	Guest/Cameo Role
1993	Aashik Awara	Kasturilal	
1993	Badi Bahen		
1993	Police Wala	Police Inspector	
1993	Gurudev	Pathan	Security Guard at Hospital
1993	Veerta	Kallu Dada	
1993	Aaja Meri Jaan	Ship Captain	
1994	Prem Shakti	Delpotiya, Kewalchand's Manager	
1994	Janam Se Pehle	Teerat Ram (Spy)	
1994	Jai Kishen	Police Constable Shevde	
1994	Krantiveer	Dr Vishwanath	
1994	Aag	Village Doctor	
1994	Beta Ho To Aisa	Poojari	
1994	Andaz Apna Apna	Robert	
1995	Policewala Gunda	Shamsher Singh Kallu	Jailor
1995	Kismat	Police Constable Talwar Singh	
1996	Bambai Ka Babu (1996 film)	Vinayak More	
1996	Loafer	Hotel Manager	
1996	Ghatak: Lethal	Shop Owner	
1997	Vijeta	Vidya Sagar Lawyer	
1998	Badmaash	Police Constable Gawde	
1998	Achanak	Veternity Doctor M.Dasturi	
1998	Dulhe Raja	Municipal Commissioner Todnar	
1998	Bade Miyan Chote Miyan	Arun, Train Passenger	
1998	China Gate	Ghanshyam	
1999	Lal Baadshah	Kiran Boss, Insurance Company Manager	
1999	Baadshah	Vijoo	
2000	Rahasya		
2000	Mela	Patil Rao	
2000	Agniputra		
2000	Pukar	Dayanand Hawasti	
2000	Hadh Kar Di Aapne	Khanna's employee	
2000	Aaghaaz	Deshpande	
2000	Khiladi 420	Nadkarni	
2001	Lajja (2001 film)	Damodar	
2001	Aamdani Atthanni Kharcha Rupaiya		
2002	Hum Kisise Kum Nahin	Pandit	
2002	Shararat	Keshav Deshpande	
2002	Hathyar: Face to Face with Reality	Chaudhary	
2002	Waah! Tera Kya Kehna	Manager	
2002	Hum Pyar Tumhi Se Kar Baithe	Shopkeeper in Mount Abu	
2003	Talaash: The Hunt Begins...	Popatbhai	Train Passenger
2003	Ek Aur Ek Gyarah	Doctor	
2004	Fida	Potential buyer	
2005	Insan	Real Estate Agent	
2005	Khullam Khulla Pyaar Karen	Ratilal	
2005	Pehchaan: The Face of Truth	Mamaji	
2005	Viruddh... Family Comes First'	Politician	
2005	Garam Masala	Mac & Sam's boss	
2006	Family - Ties of Blood		
2007	Salaam-e-Ishq	Amar, Journalist	
2008	Halla Bol	Mangesh	
2008	Khushboo		
2008	Money Hai Toh Honey Hai	Jaiswal's Doctor	
2009	Dhoondte Reh Jaaoge	Financer	
2009	Paying Guests		
2009	Ajab Prem Ki Ghazab Kahani	Robert	
2010	Atithi Tum Kab Jaoge	Himself	
2010	Golmaal 3	Shambu Kaka	
2013	Club 60		
2017	Jeeney Bhi Do Yaaron (JBDY) (Web Series)	Ganpat Sharma (Dadaji)	
2018	Jaane Kyun De Yaaron	Biju Khote	
2018	Kaamyaab	Himself	

=== Marathi films ===
Year	Title	Role	Notes
1977	Badla (1977 film)	Chaman	
1979	Paijecha Vida	Patil	
1979	Aaitya Bilavar Nagoba	Police Inspector Waghmare	
1982	Bhujang	Ramshastri Prabhune	Lunch Home (Hotel) Owner
1983	Devta (1983 film)	Daku Baldev	
1987	Gammat Jammat	Ganu Pahelwan	
1988	Unad Maina		
1988	Saglikade Bombabomb	Kingpong	
1988	Ashi Hi Banwa Banwi	Bali	
1989	Bhutacha Bhau	Indrasen Angre	
1989	Ina Mina Dika	J.D.Shahane	Manager At Transport Company
1990	Changu Mangu	Vishwasrao	
1991	Aayatya Gharat Gharoba	Gopal Rao Kirtikar	
2002	Aadhar	Daaji	
2004	Uttarayan	Babu Borkar	
2005	Ek Unaad Divas	Mohanlal	
2006	Anandache Jhaad	Jariwala	
2008	Adla Badli	Ram	
2010	Ladi Godi	Police Inspector	
2011	One Room Kitchen	Joshi	
2016	Ventilator	Shirish Appa	
2019	Stepney (2019 film)		

=== Television ===
Year!	Series	Role	Notes
1993–1997	Zabaan Sambhalke	Vitthal Bapurao Pote	
1994	Shrimaan Shrimati	Sethia/Kala Kauwa	Guest
1997	Ghar Jamai	Muthuswamy	Guest
1998	Family No.1	Aditya Kapoor	Guest
2002	CID	Judge	
2014	F.I.R.	Goga Pasha	Guest
