= Aakhri Ghulam =

1989 Indian Hindi film

- VCD Cover
- Directed by: Shibu Mitra
- Produced by: Salim Khan
- Starring: Mithun Chakraborty; Sonam
- Music by: Bappi Lahiri
- Release date: 7 July 1989
- Running time: 135 minutes
- Country: India
- Language: Hindi

Aakhri Ghulam is a 1989 Indian Hindi-language action film directed by Shibu Mitra. It stars Mithun Chakraborty and Sonam in the lead roles, along with Moushumi Chatterjee, Raj Babbar, Raza Murad, Ranjeet, Shakti Kapoor, Anupam Kher in significant supporting roles.

== Plot ==
This is the story of Bheema, who has served the family of the tyrannical Zamindar Daulat Singh for generations. One day he revolts and challenges them.

== Cast ==
- Mithun Chakraborty as Bheema
- Sonam as Sonam Singh
- Moushumi Chatterjee as Kumar's Wife
- Raj Babbar as Kumar
- Raza Murad as Jaggu Dada
- Ranjeet as Shera
- Shakti Kapoor as Banwarilal
- Anupam Kher as Rai Bahadur Daulat Singh
- Saeed Jaffrey as Fakeer
- Viju Khote as Munim
- Jagdish Raj as Jailor
- Shiva Rindani as Shiva
- Tej Sapru as Shamsher Singh
- Anu Kapoor as Dinu

== Soundtrack ==
1. "Pyar Mila To Jana Yeh Dil Ne" – Asha Bhosle, Shabbir Kumar, Shailendra Singh
2. "Sathiya O Sathiya" (Part-1) – Asha Bhosle, Shabbir Kumar
3. "Sathiya O Sathiya" (Part-2) – Uttara Kelkar, Sarika Kapoor
4. "Malik Mere" – K. J. Yesudas
5. "Dil Ki Kitaab Hoon" – Alisha Chinai
