= Sonam (actress) =

Indian actress (born 1972)

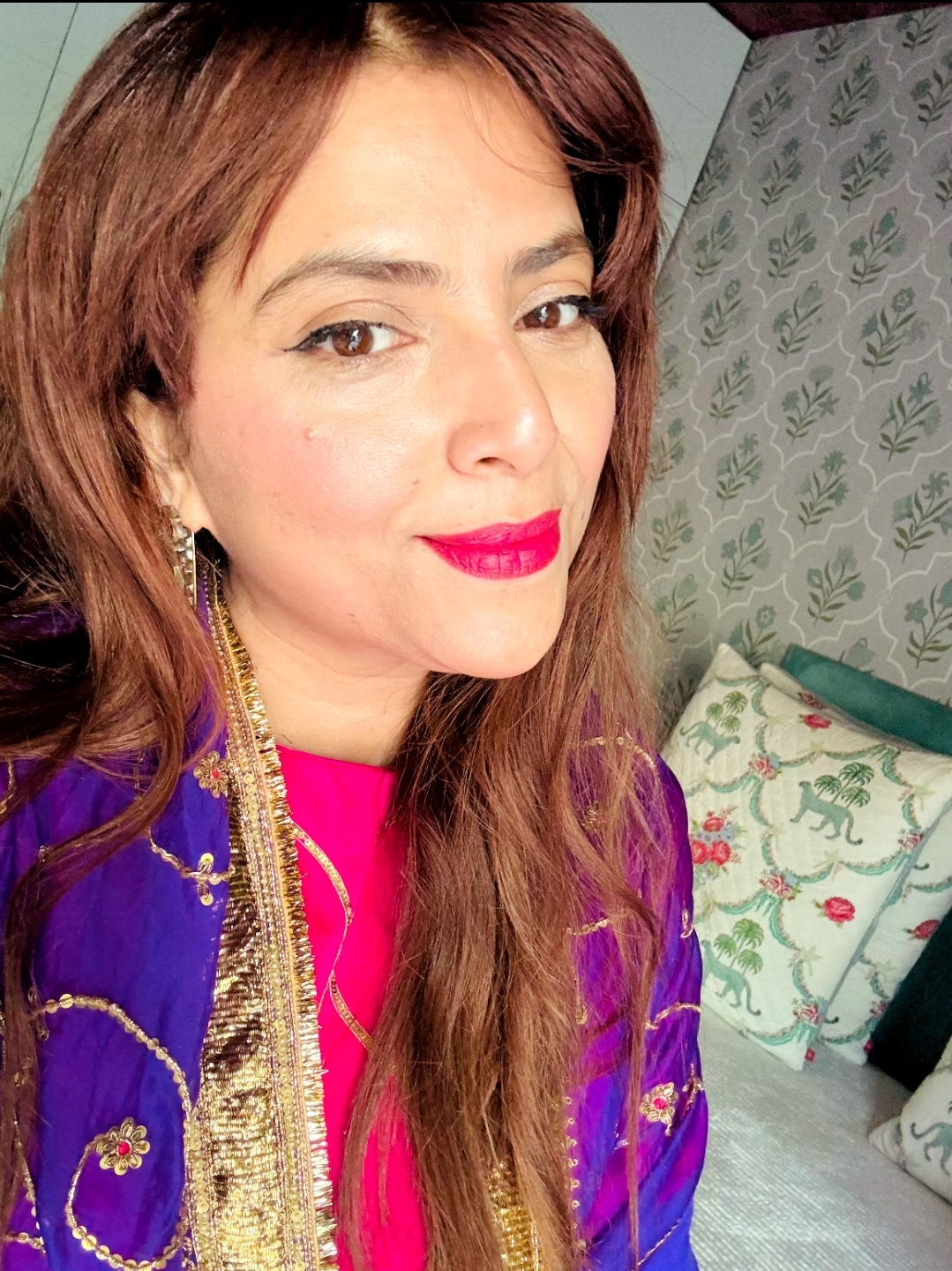
- Born: Bakhtawar Khan; 2 September 1972 (age 54); India
- Occupation: Actress
- Years active: 1987–1994
- Spouse: Rajiv Rai (m. 1991; div. 2016)
- Children: 1

Sonam Khan (born Bakhtawar Khan; 2 September 1972) is an Indian actress who is predominantly known for her work in Hindi as well as Telugu films. A granddaughter of actor Murad, she began her career with the Telugu film Samrat in 1987. She was launched in Hindi cinema by Yash Chopra in his directorial Vijay in 1988.

Sonam went on to star in several commercially successful films, including Tridev (1989), Mitti Aur Sona (1989), Kroadh (1990), Kodama Simham (1990), Ajooba (1991), Fateh (1991), and Vishwatma (1992).

== Early life ==
Sonam was born as Bakhtawar Khan to her parents Mohammad Mushir Khan and Talat Khan. She is a granddaughter of actor Murad. Actor Raza Murad is Sonam's maternal uncle and actress Sanober Kabir is her cousin. Khan adopted the screen-name 'Sonam', which was suggested to her by filmmaker Yash Chopra.

== Career ==
=== 1987–1988: Debut and breakthrough ===
Her first release was the Telugu film Samrat, opposite Ramesh Babu, in the year 1987, which was a remake of the 1983 Hindi film Betaab. Yash Chopra launched Sonam in Hindi cinema with the 1988 ensemble film Vijay, in which she was paired opposite Rishi Kapoor.

=== 1989–1994: Professional expansion ===
In 1989, Sonam had nine film releases. She gained wide recognition that year with the song "Oye Oye...Tirchi Topi Wale" from the action film Tridev. It was directed by Rajiv Rai, and she starred in it alongside Naseeruddin Shah. The film ranks among the highest-grossing films of the year. She also gained appreciation for her performance in Mitti Aur Sona, co-starring Chunky Pandey.

Sonam Khan went on to have ten releases in 1990, including the box office hit Kroadh, co-starring Sunny Deol, Sanjay Dutt and Amrita Singh. The same year, her only Bengali film Mandira, co-starring Prosenjit Chatterjee, also had a release. She also played the leading lady opposite Chiranjeevi in the top-grossing Telugu film Kodama Simham.

Her first release in 1991 was the multi-starrer fantasy film Ajooba with Amitabh Bachchan, Dimple Kapadia and Rishi Kapoor. It was one of the most expensive films of its time. Khan had seven other releases in the same year out of which the action film Fateh opposite Sanjay Dutt was well received.

In 1992, she collaborated for the third time with Naseeruddin Shah in Rajiv Rai's Vishwatma, an action thriller, which was one of the highest-grossing Hindi films of that year. During filming, she developed a close bond with her co-star Divya Bharti, who died in 1993.

Following Sonam's marriage to Rajiv Rai, she completed a few projects that she had already committed to before her marriage. These included films such as Baaz (1992) opposite Govinda, Police Wala (1993) opposite Chunky Pandey, and Insaaf Apne Lahoo Se (1994) opposite Sanjay Dutt. She did not sign any new film projects after her marriage, focusing only on finishing the ones she had already begun.

== Personal life ==
In 1991, Sonam married director Rajiv Rai, who had directed her in the films, Tridev and Vishwatma. Rai is the son of film producer Gulshan Rai, the founder of the banner Trimurti Films. After marriage, Sonam quit acting to focus on her family. The couple has a son, who was diagnosed with autism. They lived in Los Angeles, London and many other countries before eventually settling in Europe. However, their marriage deteriorated, and they separated in 2001. In 2016, they officially divorced, 15 years after their separation.

Khan returned to India in the 2020s, making her first public appearance after 30 years at Mumbai's Jio World Plaza in 2023. As of 2024, she lives in Mumbai with her son. She has expressed a desire to return to acting.

== Filmography ==
Year	Title	Role	Language
1980	Door Waadiyon Mein Kahin	Child artist	Hindi
1987	Samrat	Rekha aka Honey	Telugu
1988	Vijay	Nisha Mehra	Hindi
1988	Aakhri Adaalat	Nisha Sharma	Hindi
1988	Mugguru Kodukulu	Sobha Rani	Telugu
1989	Aakhri Ghulam	Sonam	Hindi
1989	Aakhri Baazi	Sapna	Hindi
1989	Tridev	Renuka	Hindi
1989	Mitti Aur Sona	Anupama / Neelima	Hindi
1989	Sachai Ki Taqat	Rekha	Hindi
1989	Na-Insaafi	Rita	Hindi
1989	Asmaan Se Ooncha	Sonam	Hindi
1989	Gola Barood		Hindi
1989	Hum Bhi Insaan Hain	Soni	Hindi
1990	Kroadh	Sonu	Hindi
1990	Pyar Ka Karz	Mona	Hindi
1990	Jeene Do	Sujata	Hindi
1990	Naaka Bandi	Sonia	Hindi
1990	Mandira	Mandira	Bengali
1990	Chor Pe Mor	Basanti	Hindi
1990	Aaj Ke Shahenshah	Barkha	Hindi
1990	Kodama Simham		Telugu
1990	Apmaan Ki Aag	Mona	Hindi
1990	Shera Shamshera	Durga	Hindi
1991	Raiszaada		Hindi
1991	Swarg Jaisaa Ghar	Asha	Hindi
1991	Ajooba	Shehzadi Heena	Hindi
1991	Dushman Devta	Ganga	Hindi
1991	Fateh	Sahira	Hindi
1991	Kohraam	Dhanno	Hindi
1991	Do Matwale	Sonu	Hindi
1992	Vishwatma	Renuka	Hindi
1992	Baaz		Hindi
1993	Police Wala	Meenakshi	Hindi
1994	Do Fantoosh	Nimmo	Hindi
1994	Insaaf Apne Lahoo Se	Nisha	Hindi
1994	Insaniyat	Radha	Hindi
