= Fateh (1991 film) =

- movie poster
- Directed by: Talat Jani
- Produced by: Mukesh Duggal
- Starring: Sanjay Dutt; Sonam
- Music by: Naresh Sharma
- Production companies: Prince & Prince International
- Release date: March 8, 1991
- Country: India
- Language: Hindi

Fateh (English: Victory) is a 1991 Hindi action drama film directed by Talat Jani, starring Sanjay Dutt, Mohsin Khan, Suresh Oberoi, Paresh Rawal, Ekta Sohini and Sonam as leads. Film was modest successful at the box office.

== Plot ==
Anand is a major in the military. Ranvir, Karan and Salim are his best commandos. During a military operation against Samrat (Arms Dealer and Drug Mafia), Anand loses his leg and is forced to retire. He returns to his home-town and opens a garage. One day Samrat and his gang members kill disabled Anand. Karan, Rajvir and Salim decide to take revenge. They start making inquiries and find out that Samrat is responsible for Anand's death. The trio decide to destroy Samrat's empire and kill him.

== Cast ==
- Sanjay Dutt as Karan
- Sonam as Sahira
- Shabana Azmi as Shabana
- Satyajeet as Ranvir
- Mohsin Khan as Salim
- Suresh Oberoi as Major Anand
- Paresh Rawal as Samrat
- Ekta Sohini as Maria
- Shafi Inamdar as Inspector Doshi
- Dinesh Anand as Bablia
- Arun Bakshi as Tau
- Bob Christo as Arms Dealer
- Avtar Gill as DIG Gill
- Manik Irani as Goon
- Satyendra Kapoor as Maria's dad
- Javed Khan as Albert Pinto
- Guddi Maruti as Guddi
- Gavin Packard as Henchman

== Music ==
1. "Ho Makhna O Chakhna" - Shabbir Kumar, Sukhwinder Singh, Nilesh Kumar
2. "Jaam Hai Shaam Hai" - Kavita Krishnamurthy, Anu Malik
3. "Koi Laila Humein Bhi Zara Dekhein" - Amit Kumar, Suresh Wadkar, Mohammed Aziz
4. "Tera Mera Mere Tera Bandhan Hai" - Kavita Krishnamurthy, Sukhwinder Singh, Nilesh Kumar, Vinay Mandke, Jayashree Shivram
5. "Tere Siwa Mere Siwa" - Sapna Mukherjee
6. "Tum Jo Bane Humdard Hamare" - Anuradha Paudwal, Mohammad Aziz
