= Jazbaat (1980 film) =

1980 Indian film

- Directed by: Suraj Prakash
- Written by: Suraj Prakash
- Produced by: Tarachand Barjatya
- Starring: Raj Babbar; Bhagwan; Zarina Wahab
- Music by: Raj Kamal
- Distributed by: Rajshri Productions
- Release date: 20 October 1980
- Running time: 2 hours 4 min
- Country: India
- Language: Hindi

Jazbaat is a 1980 Bollywood romantic drama film directed and written by Suraj Prakash and starring Raj Babbar, Bhagwan and Zarina Wahab.

== Cast ==
- Raj Babbar as Inspector Kumar
- Zarina Wahab as Sapna / Sangeeta
- Savita Bajaj as Jamuna
- Bhagwan as Francis
- Shail Chaturvedi as Havaldar Pandey
- Dinesh Hingoo as Havaldar Ram Prasad
- P. Jairaj
- Jankidas as Sapna's victim
- Viju Khote as Sapna's victim
- Leela Mishra as Sapna's Mausi
- Moolchand as Sapna's victim
- Rajendra Nath as Kulwant Singh
- Shashi Puri as Deepak
- Subbiraj as Ram Mohan
- T.P. Jain as J.P.
