= Sachai Ki Taqat =

- Promotional Poster
- Directed by: T. Rama Rao
- Written by: Faiz-Salim
- Story by: M. D. Sundar
- Produced by: Chander Sadanah
- Starring: Dharmendra; Amrita Singh; Govinda; Sonam
- Cinematography: P. N. Sundaram
- Edited by: Krishnaswamy - Balu
- Music by: Laxmikant–Pyarelal
- Distributed by: Shemaroo Video Pvt. Ltd.
- Release date: 23 June 1989
- Country: India
- Language: Hindi

Sachai Ki Taqat (transl. The Power of Truth) is a 1989 Indian Hindi-language film directed by T. Rama Rao and starring Dharmendra, Amrita Singh, Govinda, Sonam in lead roles.

== Cast ==
- Ashok Kumar as Janardan Singh
- Dharmendra as Constable Ram Singh
- Amrita Singh as Durga Singh
- Govinda as Sagar Singh
- Sonam as Rekha
- Shakti Kapoor as Dr. Narendra
- Anupam Kher as DCP Vijay Agarwal
- Om Shivpuri as Police Commissioner Ajit Mathur
- Seema Deo as Suman Singh , Durga's mother
- Dinesh Hingoo as Marwadi Seth
- Tej Sapru as Tony Fernandes
- Manik Irani as Rony
- Bob Christo as John
- Roopesh Kumar as Sameer, Rekha's brother
- Kunickaa Sadanand as Laxmi

== Soundtrack ==
Song	Singer
"Rani Ji O Rani Ji"	S. P. Balasubrahmanyam
"Aisa Ab Tak Hua Nahin"	Kavita Krishnamurthy, Amit Kumar
"Maine Chaha Tha"	Amit Kumar, Alka Yagnik
"Kashi Ko Dekha Nahin"	Mohammed Aziz, Amit Kumar
"Wahan Tu Hai, Yahan Main Hoon"	Amit Kumar, Hemlata
