= Do Matwale =

Do Matwale दो मतवाले
- Promotional Poster
- Directed by: Ajay Kashyap
- Story by: Ajay Kashyap
- Produced by: Pushpa S. Choudhary
- Starring: Sanjay Dutt; Chunky Pandey; Sonam; Shilpa Shirodkar
- Cinematography: K.V. Ramanna
- Edited by: Waman B. Bhosle; Gurudutt Shirali
- Music by: Laxmikant–Pyarelal
- Release date: 3 May 1991 (India)
- Country: India
- Language: Hindi

Do Matwale is a 1991 Indian Bollywood Action film directed by Ajay Kashyap and produced by Pushpa S. Choudhary. It stars Sanjay Dutt, Chunky Pandey, Sonam and Shilpa Shirodkar in pivotal roles.

== Plot ==
Amar comes to the city for his mother's medical treatment. He robbed by a local goon on medical store. Fortunately, a young man Ajay helps him. They became friends. Then one day Amar attempts to prevent Ajay from committing a robbery only to get Ajay arrested by the police. Ajay swears to avenge this. Later Amar forced to enter crime world to arrange money for his mother's operation.

Ajay gets released from jail, now his only motive is to take revenge. Ajay got shocked to know that his sister Doctor Pooja is in love with Amar. Ajay threatens Amar to stay away from Pooja. The couple elope and get married. Pooja got brutally raped and murdered by Kasturi and Pyaremohan. Now Amar and Ajay's only motive to take revenge.

== Cast ==
- Sanjay Dutt as Ajay
- Chunky Pandey as Amar
- Sonam as Sonu
- Shilpa Shirodkar as Dr. Pooja
- Kader Khan as Gorakh Nath
- Gulshan Grover as Pyaremohan
- Anjana Mumtaz as Sarita G. Nath
- Sushma Seth as Amar's mother
- Shakti Kapoor as Sampath / Champath / Ganpath
- Preeti Sapru
- Gurbachan Singh
- Kiran Kumar as Kasturi
- Viju Khote

== Soundtrack ==
#	Title	Singer(s)
1	"Anarkali Tere Sar Ki Kasam"	Jolly Mukherjee, Sudesh Bhosle, Alka Yagnik, Arun
2	"Ho Jayegi Kahau Tu"	Mohammed Aziz, Alpna Deshpande
3	"Kar Gayi Muhalle Mein Halla"	Amit Kumar
4	"Koi Hai Hum Hain"	Kavita Krishnamurthy
5	"Main Aaj Bolta Hoon"	Mohammed Aziz, Kavita Krishnamurthy
