= Hatya Kaand =

1998 film

Hatyakkand
- VCD cover
- Directed by: Girish Manukant
- Produced by: Raoji Bhai Patel
- Starring: Javed Khan, Leira Mendonca, Prem Chopra, Dinesh Hingoo, Ajit Vachani, Mahavir Jain, Rakesh Bedi, Shobhraj
- Music by: Jaikar Bjhojak
- Release date: January 1, 1998
- Country: India
- Language: Hindi

Hatya Kaand is a 1998 Indian Hindi action thriller film of Bollywood directed by Girish Manukant and produced by Raojibhai J. Patel. This film is a Hindi remake of a super hit Kannada film Lockup Death. The film was released on 4 September 1998 under the banner of R.A. Movies.

== Plot ==
A talented student can not get a job due to corruption and nepotism. His four friends also could not secure a job. In spite of bribing a corrupt minister. Instead, they are framed and tortured by a corrupt cop at the behest of the corrupt politician for raising their voice against this injustice. One of the friend's 'Kumar' is killed as result of the torture by the police and is dies in police custody. Another friend 'Amar' (Javed Khan) is framed for the murder. Being deprived, they decide to take revenge on them. At the end of the film, Amar kills the minister in open court.

== Cast ==
- Prem Chopra as Minister Natwarlal Bhandari
- Rakesh Bedi as Student Kaushik Mishra
- Anjana Mumtaz as Janki
- Deepak Shirke as Police Officer Rajshekhar
- Satyen Kappu as Police Commissioner
- Dinesh Hingoo as Lalwa
- Mahavir Shah as Advocate Arvind Mehra
- Subbiraj as Prithvi
- Razak Khan as Hamira
- Javed Khan as Amar and Janmaa
- Ajit Vachani as Lawyer Vishwanath
- Ravinder Mann as Salma
- Leira Mendonca as Julie
