= Aakhri Adaalat =

1988 Indian Hindi film

- Promotional Poster
- Directed by: Rajiv Mehra
- Written by: Ravi Kapoor
- Screenplay by: Javed Siddiqui
- Produced by: F.C. Mehra; Parvesh C. Mehra
- Starring: Vinod Khanna; Dimple Kapadia; Jackie Shroff; Sonam
- Cinematography: S.M. Anwar
- Edited by: M. S. Shinde
- Music by: Anu Malik
- Release date: 10 June 1988
- Country: India
- Language: Hindi

Aakhri Adaalat (transl. Final Court) is a 1988 Indian Hindi-language action thriller film, directed by Rajiv Mehra. It stars Vinod Khanna, Dimple Kapadia, Jackie Shroff and Sonam.

== Plot ==
Police Inspector Amar (Vinod Khanna) goes on a daring drug bust, ending in the arrest of notorious underworld criminals. Amar's work goes down the drain as the criminals dodge the law and are set free. Amar's seniors assign him a desk job and appoint Sub-Inspector Rima Kapoor (Dimple Kapadia) as Amar's assistant. Amar and Rima fall in love with each other and Amar introduces her to his mother and friend, Nitin (Jackie Shroff). Meanwhile, a vigilante wreaks havoc in the city, killing the members of the underworld. Rima stumbles upon Amar's closet, where she finds a helmet and a jacket worn by the vigilante and Amar is arrested and charged with multiple homicides. Is Amar the vigilante on a killing spree? How far will Amar go to decimate the underworld and restore justice?

== Cast ==
- Vinod Khanna as Inspector Amar Kaushal
- Dimple Kapadia as Sub-Inspector Reema Kapoor
- Jackie Shroff as Nitin Sinha, Reporter
- Sonam as Nisha Sharma
- Vinod Mehra as Barrister Shrikant Sharma
- Sushma Seth as small Mrs. Kaushal
- Seema Deo as Mrs Suman Sinha
- A. K. Hangal as Retired Judge Gajajan Kapoor
- Sudhir Dalvi as Police Commissioner Raja Pratap
- Shafi Inamdar as DSP Vinod
- Paresh Rawal as Girja Shankar
- Gulshan Grover as Shiv Saran
- Roopesh Kumar as Raghunandan
- Amrit Pal as Bosco
- Sharat Saxena as Bansidhar
- Mahavir Shah as Girdhar
- Bob Christo as Goon Wolcott
- Gurbachan as Goon Jaggu
- Anjan Srivastav as Dr. Abdul Rehman
- Johnny Lever as Havaldar Fakruddin
- Birbal as Chelaramani
- Krishan Dhawan as Goon Ramakant
- Mangal Dhillon as Prosecuting Attorney Jabbar Khan
- Rajendra Mehra as Public Prosecutor Jagdish for Shiv Saran
- Huma Khan as Rita
- Amrit Patel as Milkman Satnam
- Ramyan Tiwari as first victim Chiranjilal in titles

== Soundtrack ==
| Song | Singer |
|---|---|
| "Sola Khatam" | Alisha Chinai |
| "Aaj Nahin To Kal" | Alisha Chinai, Anu Malik |
| "Jaisa Tu Karega" | Mohammed Aziz, Anu Malik |
| "Tu Masiha, Tu Mohabbat" | Mohammed Aziz, Anuradha Paudwal |
