= Hote Hote Pyar Ho Gaya =

- Poster
- Directed by: Firoz Irani
- Written by: Anil Kalekar
- Produced by: Pradip Jain
- Starring: Jackie Shroff; Kajol; Atul Agnihotri
- Cinematography: Damodar Naidu
- Edited by: Hussain Burmawala
- Music by: Anand Raj Anand; Pradeep Udhas; Naeem Ejaz; Rani Malik (lyrics)
- Distributed by: Eros International
- Release date: 2 July 1999
- Country: India
- Language: Hindi
- Budget: ₹2.50 crore
- Box office: ₹2.39 crore

Hote Hote Pyar Ho Gaya (transl. Finally, I have fallen in love) is a 1999 Indian Bollywood Hindi-language romantic action film directed by Firoz Irani, released on 2 July 1999. The film stars Jackie Shroff, Atul Agnihotri, Kajol and Ayesha Jhulka in lead roles.

== Plot ==
Atul aka Bunty (Atul Agnihotri) and Pinky (Kajol) meet and fall in love with each other. They want to get married. However, their parents are against this and in fact, both sets of parents have arranged for them to marry other people. Finding no other option, Atul turns to his aunt, Buaji (Aruna Irani) to help him and Pinky find a way out. Buaji suggests that Atul and Pinky marry the spouses that their parents want them to marry. However, after their marriage, both Atul and Pinky should torment their respective spouses to the extent that their spouses get frustrated and seek divorces, which will then leave them free to marry the person they love.

Atul and Pinky decide to go along with Buaji's plan. Accordingly, Atul marries Shobha (Ayesha Jhulka) and Pinky marries Arjun (Jackie Shroff), as per the wishes of their respective parents. After their wedding, Atul and Pinky try to torture their spouses with numerous shenanigans. Atul claims to be a womanizer and leaves his wife alone on their wedding night, pretending to go to a brothel. The next day, he tells his wife that he is in the habit of drinking heavily. Meanwhile, Pinky also leaves her husband alone on their wedding night, visits a nightclub and nurses a bottle of booze. Their spouses are disturbed, but instead of reacting, they both try to adjust themselves to the difficult situation and try to make their spouses happy.

Shobha and Arjun meet by a chance encounter and realise Atul and Pinky's plan and try to make them jealous by meeting with each other on the sly. Atul and Pinky realise this and try to hurt Shobha and Arjun as well. Eventually, Atul and Pinky realise that they have fallen in love with their respective spouses. Will Atul and Pinky decide to walk out on their spouses and marry each other or will they go back to their respective spouses and live happily ever after?

== Cast ==
- Jackie Shroff ... Police Officer Arjun
- Kajol ... Pinky
- Atul Agnihotri ... Atul (Bunty)
- Ayesha Jhulka ... Shobha
- Aruna Irani ... Buaji
- Kulbhushan Kharbanda ... Colonel (Pinky's father)
- Prem Chopra ... Jagawar
- Rita Bhaduri ... Asha
- Anil Dhawan ... Ajit
- Anjana Mumtaz ... Arjun's mother
- Vithal Pol ... Bunty and Pinky's friend

== Production ==
Hote Hote Pyar Ho Gaya was previously titled Chaal.

== Music ==
Hote Hote Pyar Ho Gaya

Studio album by Anand Raj Anand, Pradeep Udhas
- Released: 1999 (India)
- Genre: Feature film soundtrack
- Producer: Anand Raj Anand, Pradeep Udhas

The soundtrack of the film contains 7 songs. The songs were composed by Anand Raj Anand and Pradeep Udhas, with the song Haiyo Hikko Nikko Ni being composed in collaboration with Naeem Ejaz. Lyricist: Rani Malik, Zameer Kazmi (song O Jane Jaa), M. G. Hashmat (song "Jab Tum Mere").

Song	Singer(s)	Lyricist(s)
"Haiyo Hikko Nikko Ni"	Kavita Krishnamurthy	Rani Malik
"Haiyo Hikko Nikko Ni"	Anand Raj Anand	Rani Malik
"Hote Hote Pyaar Ho Gaya"	Alka Yagnik	Rani Malik
"Jab Tum Mere"	Kumar Sanu	M. G. Hashmat
"Laddu Motichur Ka"	Alka Yagnik, Poornima	Rani Malik
"O Jane Jaa"	Udit Narayan, Sadhana Sargam	Zameer Kazmi
"Pyar Wale Rang"	K. S. Chithra	Rani Malik
