= Asmaan Se Ooncha =

- Theatrical release poster
- Directed by: Mehul Kumar
- Screenplay by: Nusrat Syed
- Story by: Pravin Bhatt
- Produced by: Sujit Kumar
- Starring: Jeetendra; Raj Babbar; Anita Raj; Govinda; Sonam
- Cinematography: Russi Billimoria
- Edited by: Yusuf Shaikh
- Music by: Rajesh Roshan
- Production company: Shiv Bhakti Films
- Release date: 3 March 1989
- Running time: 140 minutes
- Country: India
- Language: Hindi

Asmaan Se Ooncha (transl. Higher than the Sky) is a 1989 Indian Hindi-language action film, produced by Sujit Kumar under the Shiv Bhakti Films banner and directed by Mehul Kumar. It stars Jeetendra, Raj Babbar, Anita Raj, Govinda, Sonam and music composed by Rajesh Roshan.

== Plot ==
Kishan, who lives with his sister, Reshmi, runs a gas station in Srinagar. One day while returning home, he hears cries of help from a woman in a jeep. He chases and overtakes the jeep, and rescues the woman from four hoodlums. He finds out that the woman is Anita, who has run away from her cruel uncle who wanted to sell her for a large sum of money. Kishan permits her to live with them, and soon both fall in love with each other. Then their lives are turned upside down when Naag Raj, one of the hoodlums who had attempted to molest Anita, returns and sexually assaults Reshmi. When Kishan comes to her rescue, he ends up killing one of the men, and setting fire to the gas station, while Naag Raj absconds. The Police arrest Kishan and he is sent to prison for several years. A pregnant Anita attempts to kill herself, but is rescued by Delhi-based Police Inspector Ranjit Malik, who subsequently marries her and allows her to give birth to a baby boy, Vikrant alias Vicky. Years later Vicky has grown up and has fallen in love with a lovely young woman named Sonam, who he rescued from a molester named Prem Raj. Ranjit gets transferred to Bombay to nab an underworld Don by the name of King. Vicky is recruited as a Police Inspector with Bombay Police. One night, Anita wakes up to see a man pointing a gun at Ranjit, she is shocked to see that the man is none other than her former lover, Kishan. The question remains why does Kishan want to kill Ranjit, and what impact Kishan's arrival will have on Anita?

== Cast ==
- Jeetendra as Kishan / King
- Raj Babbar as DSP Ranjeet Malik
- Anita Raj as Anita Malik
- Govinda as Inspector Vikram Malik "Vicky"
- Sonam as Sonam
- Sadashiv Amrapurkar as Naagraj
- Sujit Kumar as Mumbai Police Commissioner
- Jagdish Raj as Delhi Police Commissioner
- Adi Irani as Premraj
- Mac Mohan as Rony
- Dev Kumar as Premchand Kochar

== Soundtrack ==
The movie featured 5 songs. The music was by Rajesh Roshan. The song "Zindagi Se Jab Mile" was the first collaboration of singers Kumar Sanu and Abhijeet. other singers who contributed in this album were Sadhna Sargam, Nitin Mukesh, Shabbir Kumar, Mohammed Aziz, Anwar and Parvati Khan.

Song	Singer
"Kya Rokegi Duniya"	Shabbir Kumar, Sadhana Sargam
"Jiya Pyar Mange Jiya"	Kumar Sanu, Sadhana Sargam
"Jaanam Meri Sonam"	Mohammed Aziz, Sadhana Sargam
"Yeh Dil-E-Nadaan"	Parvati Khan
"Zindagi Se Jab Mile"	Kumar Sanu, Abhijeet, Anwar, Sadhana Sargam, Sarika Kapoor
