= Aaj Ke Shahenshah =

- Poster
- Directed by: Shibu Mitra
- Written by: Faiz - Saleem; Indeevar; Anjaan (lyrics)
- Produced by: I.A.Desai; Saleem Khan
- Starring: Jeetendra; Chunky Pandey; Raj Babbar; Kimi Katkar; Sonam
- Cinematography: Sushil Chopra
- Edited by: Heera
- Music by: Bappi Lahiri
- Production company: D.S. Films
- Release date: 1990
- Running time: 136 minutes
- Country: India
- Language: Hindi

Aaj Ke Shahenshah (transl. Today's Emperor) is a 1990 Hindi-language action film, produced by I.A. Desai and Saleem Khan under the D.S. Films banner and directed by Shibu Mitra. It stars Jeetendra, Chunky Pandey, Raj Babbar, Kimi Katkar, and Sonam with music composed by Bappi Lahiri.

== Plot ==
The film begins with lovebirds Saawan and Barkha. Apart from that, Pinky is an adamant and techy daughter of a hoodlum, Kanchan Seth, infatuated with Saawan. Now, Saawan & Barkha fraternize with their respective brothers Barsati & Vikram / Vicky. Vicky is justice-seeking, whereas Barsati is a ruffian. Here, the situation turns, as the two men are rivals and declare abstention of the lovers. Bewildered, Saawan & Barkha seek reality. Prior, Vicky and Barsati are good friends until the arrival of Nisha, a girl loved by both. However, Nisha tunes Vicky when outraged Barsati molests her, so she is detached from Vicky and the warfare aroused. Nevertheless, Saawan & Barkha stick strongly. Parallelly, Kanchan Seth settles Pinky's alliance with Saawan, which he denies, and elopes with Barkha, and destiny lands them at Nisha. Ascertaining the situation, Nisha determines to unite them by resolving the rift. Besides, Kanchan Seth tells his daughter to retrieve Saawan, but he falsifies by means of harm. Being cognizant of it, Vicky and Barsati bind and safeguard the lovers. The movie ends with Barsati sacrificing his life as contrition for his sin by knitting Vicky and Nisha.

== Cast ==
- Jeetendra as Vikram / Vicky
- Chunky Pandey as Saawan
- Raj Babbar as Barsaati
- Kimi Katkar as Nisha
- Sonam as Barkha
- Raza Murad as Kanchan Seth
- Ranjeet as Mangal
- Iqbal Khan
- Om Shivpuri as Lawyer Ajit Khanna
- Chandrashekhar Vaidya as Surinder, Barsaati's father
- Ashalata Wabgaonkar as Sudhas Barsaati's mother
- Aruna Irani as Sujata's MLA
- Amritpal as Madhav
- Tej Sapru as Police Inspector Goga Vidyarthi
- Yunus Parvez as Dharmesh Saxena
- Sonika Gill as Pinky

== Soundtrack ==
#	Title	Singer(s)
1	"Haiya Re Haiya"	Shabbir Kumar, Udit Narayan, Alka Yagnik
2	"Hum Dono Akele Hon"	Bappi Lahiri, Anuradha Paudwal
3	"Mohabbat Kitne Rang"	Kumar Sanu
4	"Rasgulla Khilaye Ke"	Alka Yagnik
5	"Bolo Bolo Wo Hai Kya"	Mohammed Aziz, Alka Yagnik
