= Police Wala =

1993 Hindi film

Policewala
- Directed by: Sikander Bharti
- Produced by: Sandeep Kumar
- Starring: Chunky Pandey; Sonam; Vinod Mehra; Amjad Khan
- Cinematography: Sushil Chopra
- Edited by: Nand Kumar
- Music by: Bappi Lahiri
- Production company: Sandeep Films
- Release date: 27 August 1993
- Country: India
- Language: Hindi

Policewala is a 1993 Indian Hindi-language coming-of-age action thriller film directed by Sikander Bharti and produced by Sundeep Kumar. This movie was released under the banner of Sandeep Films.

== Plot ==
Honest and dutiful Police officer Rakesh was murdered by a mafia boss. Rakaes's son Jimmi joins in the police force and becomes an undercover cop. He acted as an inmate and infiltrates into the gang of criminals to collect evidence against Mafia bosses. There are three top notorious leaders in the city who had killed Jimmi's father. Police arrest two of them, Tejeswar and Ranu, by the secret help of Jimmi. But the third one knows Jimmi is actually a CBI officer in plain clothes.

== Cast ==
- Chunky Pandey as CBI Officer Jagmohan / Jimmy
- Sonam as Meenakshi
- Vinod Mehra as Inspector Prabhakar / Smuggler (Double Role)
- Shakti Kapoor as Rajendra Chakravarty / Ronu Dada
- Kiran Kumar as Tejeshwar Chaudhary
- Amjad Khan as Judge
- Om Shivpuri as Police Commissioner
- Parikshat Sahni as Inspector Rakesh
- Anjana Mumtaz as Mrs. Rakesh
- Viju Khote as Police Inspector
- Tej Sapru
- Gurbachan Singh as Shera
- Ishrat Ali as John
- Mac Mohan as Micheal
- Sudhir as Daniel
- Arun Bakshi as Train Passenger

== Soundtrack ==
Original Motion Picture Soundtrack
No.	Title	Singer(s)	Length
1.	"Aaye Raat Bhar"	Anuradha Paudwal, Udit Narayan	7:54
2.	"Kaun Hai Asli"	Asha Bhosle, Amit Kumar	6:19
3.	"Mera Majnu"	Mohammed Aziz	5:51
4.	"Mere Laila"	Alka Yagnik	5:47
5.	"Ooh Aah Ooh"	Sudesh Bhosle, Sapna Mukherjee	7:18
