= Touhean =

- Directed by: Madan Joshi
- Produced by: Manu Ahuja
- Starring: Raj Babbar; Dimple Kapadia; Padmini Kolhapure
- Cinematography: Anil Mitra
- Music by: Bappi Lahiri
- Release date: 20 November 1992
- Running time: 139 minutes
- Country: India
- Language: Hindi

Touhean (transl. Insult) is a 1992 Bollywood film directed by Madan Joshi and produced by Manu Ahuja. The film has stars Raj Babbar, Dimple Kapadia, Padmini Kolhapure in lead roles, along with Shashi Kapoor, Aruna Irani, Shreeram Lagoo, Shakti Kapoor in supporting roles. Bappi Lahiri has composed the music. The film was completed in 1987 and ready for release, but due to the distribution problem, the film was finally released in 1992.

== Cast ==
- Shashi Kapoor as Dr. Rizvi
- Raj Babbar as Dr. Sharad
- Dimple Kapadia as Deepika
- Padmini Kolhapure as Sansani / Sandhya
- Aruna Irani as Margaret
- Shakti Kapoor as Bihari
- Satish Shah as Dr. Mittal
- Shreeram Lagoo as Mr. Shrivastav
- Urmila Bhatt as Gomti Bai
- Jagdeep as Naseebdar
- Mohan Choti as Banana Seller
- Manmohan Krishna as Singer

== Music ==
Song	Singer
"Tujhe Usse"	Kishore Kumar, Asha Bhosle
"Babai Babai"	Asha Bhosle
"Yaad Unko"	Asha Bhosle, Bappi Lahiri
"Pyar Karo, Pyar Karo"	Asha Bhosle, Manhar Udhas, Mohammed Aziz
"Sajan Sajan"	Mohammed Aziz, S. Janaki
