= Mandira (film) =

- Mandira VCD cover
- Directed by: Sujit Guha
- Written by: Tapendu Gangopadhyay
- Screenplay by: Tapendu Gangopadhyay
- Story by: Tapendu Gangopadhyay
- Produced by: Pahlaj Nihalani
- Starring: Pradeep Kumar; Prosenjit Chatterjee; Neelam; Indrani Haldar; Sonam
- Music by: Bappi Lahiri
- Release date: 11 May 1990
- Country: India
- Language: Bengali

Mandira is a 1990 Bengali film directed by Sujit Guha and produced by Pahlaj Nihalani. The film features actors Prosenjit Chatterjee, Indrani Haldar, and Sonam in the lead roles. Music of the film was composed by Bappi Lahiri. It is a remake of 1980 Hindi film Aasha.

== Cast ==
- Prosenjit Chatterjee as Shantanu
- Indrani Haldar as Sudeepa
- Sonam as Mandira
- Chunky Pandey
- Neelam
- Pradeep Kumar
- Shakuntala Barua

== Songs ==
- "Sab Lal Pathor" (Happy) –

Lata Mangeshkar

- "Sab Lal Pathor" (Sad) –

Lata Mangeshkar

- "Tumi Jemoni Nupur" (Happy) –

Bappi Lahiri

- "Tumi Jemoni Nupur" (Sad) –

Bappi Lahiri

- "Joy Gobindo Joy Gopal" –

Anupama Deshpande

- "Asun Kinun Putul" –

Reema Lahiri

- "Dhin Dhina Dhin Tak Dhina –

Amit Kumar, Shabbir Kumar

- "Tomay Chhere Ami" –

Amit Kumar, Alka Yagnik

- "Sangeete Aaj Amra Dujon" –

Mohammed Aziz, Sabina Yasmin
