= Naaka Bandi =

- Directed by: Shibu Mitra
- Produced by: P. M. Jain
- Starring: Sridevi; Dharmendra; Sonam
- Music by: Bappi Lahiri
- Release date: 1990
- Country: India
- Language: Hindi

Naaka Bandi is a 1990 Indian Hindi-language action film directed by Shibu Mitra and produced by P. M. Jain. The film's music was composed by Bappi Lahiri. The cast included Sridevi, Dharmendra, Sonam, Amrish Puri, Anupam Kher, Chunky Panday, and Dara Singh.

One of the film's notable sequences include the song "Main Sridevi Lagti Hoon", in which Sridevi evokes several earlier Hindi-film actresses such as Meena Kumari, Sadhana, Asha Parekh and Mumtaz, before ending with the refrain that she "looks like Sridevi".

Naaka Bandi was theatrically released on 4 May 1990. The trade website Box Office India names it as the fifteenth-highest-grossing Indian film of 1990.

== Plot ==
Dharam Singh is an honest and upright truck driver who lives with his wife, Shanti, and their young son, Raja. He takes pity on a young orphan named Veera and welcomes him into his family, raising him alongside Raja as one of his own children. Despite their different backgrounds, Veera and Raja grow up as brothers, sharing a close family bond.

Dharam has a strong sense of justice and refuses to tolerate criminal activities, even when they involve his own family. His brother, Kaalia, is involved in anti-national activities and criminal dealings. Unable to accept his brother's wrongdoing, Dharam helps bring about Kaalia's arrest. This decision creates a dangerous conflict with Kaalia's criminal associates, particularly Mangal Singh, who is angered by Dharam's actions.

Seeking revenge against Dharam, Mangal Singh attacks the family and murders both Dharam and Shanti. Their infant daughter, Sonia, is left abandoned following the killings. With Dharam and Shanti dead, the responsibility of looking after the family falls upon Veera. He takes care of the young Raja and ensures that the family remains together despite the tragedy. Sonia is subsequently raised by the eccentric police officer Karamchand.

As the years pass, Veera grows into a strong, responsible and hardworking young man. He takes charge of the family's trucking business and works to preserve everything Dharam had built. Raja also grows up, becoming a young college student. Although Veera and Raja have been raised as brothers, their relationship is put to the test when the criminals responsible for their family's suffering return to their lives.

Mangal Singh, who has managed to evade the police following Dharam and Shanti's murders, adopts the identity of Santhaal and continues his criminal activities. He operates with the assistance of an underworld figure named Zebran and a corrupt police officer, Satyaprakash. Zebran's son, Prince, is also involved in criminal activities. Together, these men form part of the criminal network through which Mangal continues to exercise his influence.

Meanwhile, Raja becomes involved in an encounter with Prince, a hoodlum whose criminal behaviour brings him into conflict with the young man. Raja rescues Sonia from Prince, establishing a connection between the two. Sonia, who has grown up under Karamchand's care, is unaware of the full circumstances surrounding the tragedy that separated her from her biological family.

Veera, meanwhile, is focused on the past and has not forgotten the brutal murder of his foster parents. He remains determined to confront those responsible and bring Mangal Singh to justice. However, before he can carry out his plans, another threat emerges from within his own family.

Kaalia returns after his release from prison. Rather than making peace with Veera, he becomes determined to get rid of him and gain control of the family's property. Recognising the close relationship between Veera and Raja, Kaalia devises a plan to turn the two against each other. He takes advantage of Raja's trust and gradually influences him into believing that Veera is not acting in his best interests.

During this period, Veera becomes romantically involved with Geeta, a young woman who enters his life while he is dealing with the growing family conflict. Geeta becomes an important source of support as Veera faces the challenges created by Kaalia and Mangal Singh.

Kaalia's manipulation eventually succeeds in driving a wedge between the two brothers. Raja begins to doubt Veera's intentions and is led to believe that Veera has stolen from him. The accusations destroy the trust that had held the family together for so many years. Raja turns against the very person who raised him and ultimately orders Veera to leave the house. He then joins forces with Kaalia and Santhaal, unknowingly placing himself on the side of the criminals responsible for his family's tragedy.

Despite being rejected by Raja, Veera does not abandon his determination to fight the criminals. With Geeta by his side, he prepares to confront Kaalia and Santhaal and put an end to their activities. The conflict brings together the various enemies whose actions have shaped the family's troubled history. Veera launches a fierce battle against the criminal network, leading to the film's climactic confrontation.

== Cast ==
Actor	Character
Dharmendra	Veer 'Veera' Singh
Chunky Pandey	Raja 'Munna' D. Singh
Sonam	Sonia
Sridevi	Geeta / Seeta
Dara Singh	Dharam Singh
Beena Banerjee	Shanti M. Singh
Sadashiv Amrapurkar	Kaalia Singh
Amrish Puri	Mangal Singh / Santhal
Anupam Kher	Havaldar / CID Inspector Karamchand
Satyendra Kapoor	Mehar
Tej Sapru	Prince
Sharat Saxena	Kamran
Rakesh Bedi	Tularam
Brahmachari	Banwarilal
Sunil Dhawan	Geeta's father
Mangal Dhillon	Inspector
Kamaldeep	Smuggler
Manik Irani	Goon
Manmauji	Havaldar
Yunus Parvez	Santhal's associate
Joginder Shelly	Mangal's henchman
Gurbachan Singh	Michael
Birbal	Cameo appearance
Mac Mohan	Cameo appearance
Master Bunty	Child rescued by Veera

== Soundtrack ==
! Playback singers
1
Main Hoon Naughty Girl
Asha Bhosle
-
2
Sun Sun Sun Meri Soni Ho Gayi Kya Anhoni
Asha Bhosle, Shabbir Kumar
-
3
Pyar Kiya Hai, Pyar Hai Tumse Karna
Amit Kumar, Kavita Krishnamurthy
-
4
Kai Tar Gaye
Shailendra Singh, Shabbir Kumar
-
5
Naaka Bandi
Usha Uthup, Bappi Lahiri
-
6
Kai Tar Gaye (Sad Version)
Shailendra Singh, Shabbir Kumar
-
7
Thaam Thaam Dil Ko Le Thaam
Asha Bhosle
-
8
Ishvar Bolo, Allaah Bolo Chaahe Bolo Raam
Shabbir Kumar, Shailendra Singh
}
