= Anjana Mumtaz =

Indian film and television actress

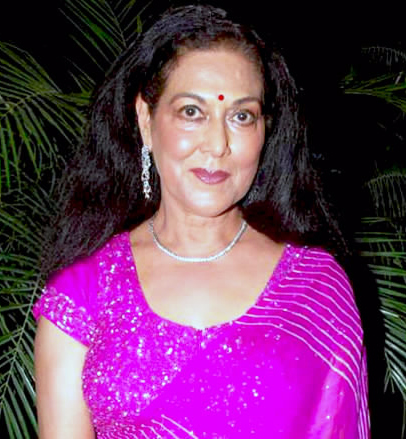
- Anjana Mumtaz in 2010
- Born: Anjana Manjrekar; 4 January 1951 (age 75); Bombay, Bombay Presidency, British Raj (now Mumbai, Maharashtra, India)
- Occupation: Actress
- Years active: 1968–2019
- Known for: Maa Ka Aanchal; Baharon Phool Barsao
- Spouse: Sajid Mumtaz (m. 1978)
- Children: Ruslaan Mumtaz

Anjana Mumtaz (born 4 January 1951) is an Indian actress, who is known for her supporting roles in over a hundred Hindi, Marathi and Gujarati-language films. Born as Anjana Manjrekar, she married Sajid Mumtaz, an Air India official. Her son is Ruslaan Mumtaz.

== Filmography ==
- 2011 The Life Zindagi as Doctor
- 2008 Tulsi as Mom
- 2006 Sarhad Paar
- 2006 Janani as Tarun's mom
- 2006 Unns: Love... Forever as Ria's mom
- 2005 Kasak as Mrs. Sharma (Amar's mom)
- 2003 Jodi Kya Banayi Wah Wah Ramji
- 2003 Koi... Mil Gaya as Mrs. Harbans Saxena
- 2003 Stumped as Anjana
- 2002 Akhiyon Se Goli Maare as Sulekha Bhangare
- 2002 Yeh Mohabbat Hai as Chand's mother
- 2002 Tum Jiyo Hazaron Saal as Dr. Anju
- 2001 Kasam as Mrs. Jaswant Singh
- 2001 Ittefaq as Vikram's Mother
- 2001 Inteqam as Mrs. Kapoor
- 2000 Krodh as Mrs. Verma
- 2000 Dhadkan as Anjali's mother
- 1999 Chehraa
- 1999 Dahek as Mrs. Roshan
- 1999 Hote Hote Pyar Ho Gaya as Arjun's mom
- 1999 Jai Hind as Urmila
- 1999 Jaalsaaz
- 1998 Barsaat Ki Raat
- 1998 Hatya Kaand
- 1998 Zulm O Situm as Mrs. Sharma
- 1998 Dulhe Raja as Mrs. Elizabeth Singhania
- 1998 Aakrosh as Anjali Malhotra
- 1998 Miss 420 as Anjana
- 1998 Yeh Na Thi Hamari Qismat
- 1997 Dil Ke Jharoke Main as Mrs. Mahendrapratap Rai
- 1997 Mohabbat Ki Aag
- 1997 Jodidar as Munna's mom / Savita
- 1997 Share Bazaar
- 1997 Tumse Pyar Ho Gaya
- 1996 Bhairavi asRadha (Ragini's mom)
- 1996 Hahakaar (as Anjana)
- 1996 Zordaar as Shiva & Tony's mom
- 1996 Dushman Duniya Ka as Asha (Lata's mom)
- 1996 Khiladiyon Ka Khiladi as Mrs. Malhotra (Akshay's mom)
- 1996 Tu Chor Main Sipahi as Kaushalya Varma
- 1996 Saajan Chale Sasural as Shyamsunder's mom
- 1995 Haqeeqat as Sumitra - Shivcharan's wife
- 1995 Kalyug Ke Avtaar as Anjana
- 1995 Sabse Bada Khiladi as Gomti Chachi
- 1995 Jeena Nahin Bin Tere
- 1994 Beta Ho To Aisa as Laxmi - Anand's wife
- 1994 Cheetah as Mrs. Rajeshwar
- 1994 Paramaatma as Rajni's mom
- 1994 Eena Meena Deeka as Raju's Mother
- 1993 Sangram
- 1993 Krishan Avtaar
- 1993 Aadmi (1993 film)
- 1993 Shaktiman As (Parvati) Mukesh Khanna's Wife
- 1993 Dil Hai Betaab
- 1993 Police Wala as Mrs Rakesh
- 1993 Dil Tera Aashiq
- 1992 Dil Hi To Hai (1992 film)
- 1992 Khuda Gawah as Salma Mirza
- 1992 Tirangaa
- 1992 Yaad Rakhegi Duniya
- 1992 Naach Govinda Naach
- 1992 Deedar
- 1992 Anaam
- 1991 Prem Qaidi
- 1991 Shikari: The Hunter
- 1991 Banjaran
- 1991 Paap Ki Aandhi as Lakshmi
- 1991 Dancer
- 1991 Phool Aur Kaante
- 1991 Do Matwale
- 1991 Saajan
- 1991 Chamatkar
- 1990 Aag Ka Gola
- 1989 Kala Bazaar
- 1989 Nigahen: Nagina Part II
- 1989 Farz Ki Jung
- 1989 Vardi
- 1989 Bhrashtachar
- 1989 Dost Garibon Ka
- 1989 Mitti Aur Sona
- 1989 Tridev
- 1988 Khatron Ke Khiladi as sumanti
- 1986 Ghar Sansar
- 1986 Samundar
- 1986 Vikram Betaal as Princess Meenakshi
- 1983 Ganga Meri Maa
- 1981 Mahabali Hanuman
- 1979 Do Hawaldaar
- 1979 Teen Cheharey
- 1977 Rangaa Aur Raja
- 1977 Ram Ram Gangaram Marathi film
- 1976 Tumcha Aamcha Jamala [ Marathi film]
- 1975 Salaakhen
- 1973 Do Phool
- 1973 Bandhe Haath
- 1972 Baharon Phool Barsao
- 1969 Mahua as Mahua
- 1969 Sambandh
- 1970 Maa Ka Anchal
- 1970 Deedar

== Television ==
Year	Serial	Role	Channel
1986	Buniyaad	Subhadra	DD National
1997–1998	Chattaan	Gayatri Shamsher Raj	Zee TV
1998–1999	Jaan		Zee TV
2001	Kudrat	Mrs. Seth	DD National
2001–2003	Gharana	Mrs. Somani	Zee TV
2002–2004	Devi	Revati Kailashnath Sharma	Sony Entertainment Television
