= List of Hindi films of 1989 =

This is a list of films produced by the Bollywood film industry based in Mumbai in 1989.

== Highest-grossing films ==
The highest-grossing films of 1989 at the Indian box office were:

Rank	Title	Gross collection
1	Maine Pyar Kiya	₹28 crore
2	Ram Lakhan	₹18 crore
3	Tridev	₹17 crore

== Films ==
Title	Director	Cast	Genre	Music director
Aag Ka Gola	David Dhawan	Sunny Deol, Dimple Kapadia, Shakti Kapoor, Archana Puran Singh	Action	Bappi Lahiri
Aag Se Khelenge	Bhaskar Shetty	Jeetendra, Anil Kapoor, Meenakshi Seshadri	Action	
Aakhri Baazi	Ashim S. Samanta	Govinda, Shatrughan Sinha, Moushumi Chatterjee	Action	
Aakhri Badla	Mangal Chakraborty	Mithun Chakraborty, Yogeeta Bali, Prem Chopra	Action	
Aakhri Ghulam	Shibbu Mitra	Mithun Chakraborty, Raj Babbar, Sonam		
Abhi To Main Jawan Hoon	Amjad Khan	Sachin, Sohani	Comedy	
Abhimanyu	Tony Juneja	Anil Kapoor, Kimi Katkar, Poonam Dhillon		
Agla Mausam	Sagar Sarhadi	Supriya Pathak, Pankaj Kapoor		
Anjaane Rishte	Diljit Singh	Shekhar Suman, Ashok Kumar	Drama	
Apna Desh Paraye Log	Pradeep Hooda	Sumeet Saigal, Sonu Walia, Moon Moon Sen		
Apne Begaane	Madhu Tejpal	Sumeet Saigal, Anuradha Patel		
Asmaan Se Ooncha	Mehul Kumar	Jeetendra, Sonam, Govinda, Anita Raj, Raj Babbar	Drama	Rajesh Roshan
Awara Zindagi	A. A. Darpan	Raj Kiran, Jagdish Raj, Kader Khan		Jagdish J.
Babul				
Bade Ghar Ki Beti	Kalpataru	Meenakshi Seshadri, Rishi Kapoor, Shammi Kapoor, Raj Kiran, Gulshan Grover, Kader Khan	Drama	Laxmikant–Pyarelal
Bahurani	Manik Chatterjee	Rekha, Rakesh Roshan, Utpal Dutt, Deven Verma, Rakesh Bedi	Drama	Rahul Dev Burman
Bandook Dahej Ke Seenay Par	Ramgopal Gupta	Sadashiv Amrapurkar, Sonika Gill, Gulshan Grover		
Batwara	J.P. Dutta	Dharmendra, Vinod Khanna, Dimple Kapadia, Amrita Singh, Poonam Dhillon, Shammi Kapoor, Mohsin Khan, Amrish Puri	Drama, action	Laxmikant–Pyarelal
Bhrashtachar	Ramesh Sippy	Mithun Chakraborty, Rekha, Rajinikanth, Shilpa Shirodkar, Abhinav Chaturvedi, Anupam kher, Raza Murad	Drama, action	Laxmikant–Pyarelal
Billoo Badshah	Sisir Misra	Govinda, Neelam Kothari, Anita Raj, Shatrughan Sinha, Kader Khan	Action, drama	Jagjit Singh
ChaalBaaz	Pankaj Parashar	Sunny Deol, Sridevi, Rajinikanth, Anupam Kher	Romance, comedy	Laxmikant Pyarelal
Chaalu Pe Chaalu				
Chahungi Tujhe Bar Bar				
Chandni	Yash Chopra	Sridevi, Rishi Kapoor, Vinod Khanna, Waheeda Rehman	Romance, drama, musical	Shiv-Hari
Charana				
Chingari	Ram Maheshwari	Sanjay Khan, Leena Chandavarkar, Pran, Shatrughan Sinha, Tiwari	Drama	Ravi
Clerk	Manoj Kumar	Manoj Kumar, Mohammed Ali, Shashi Kapoor, Rekha	Drama	Uttam Jagadish
Daata	Sultan Ahmed	Mithun Chakravorty. Shammi Kapoor, Padmini Kolhapure, Suresh Oberoi, Amrish Puri	Action	Kalyanji Anandji
Daddy	Mahesh Bhatt	Pooja Bhatt, Anupam Kher, Manohar Singh, Raj Zutshi	Drama	Rajesh Roshan
Dana Paani	Deven Verma	Ashok Kumar, Mithun Chakraborty, Padmini Kolhapure, Nirupa Roy, Sadashiv Amrapurkar, Aruna Irani, Shafi Inamdar	Drama	Anu Malik
Dav Pech	Kawal Sharma	Jeetendra, Bhanupriya, Prem Chopra, Shakti Kapoor	Drama	Anu Malik
Desh Ke Dushman	Swaroop Kumar	Raaj Kumar, Hema Malini, Aditya Pancholi, Mandakini, Sadashiv Amrapurkar, Bob Christo, Prema Narayan, Navin Nischol		Sonik-Omi
Dil Lagake Dekho				
Do Qaidi	Ajay Kashyap	Govinda, Sanjay Dutt, Farah, Neelam Kothari, Amrish Puri, Gulshan Grover	Action, thriller	Laxmikant–Pyarelal
Doorie	Raj Dutt	Sharmila Tagore, Marc Zuber, Vikram Gokhale		
Dost	K. Murali Mohan Rao	Mithun Chakraborty, Amala, Amjad Khan	Drama	
Dost Garibon Ka	C. P. Dixit	Govinda, Neelam Kothari		
Eeshwar	K. Vishwanath	Anil Kapoor, Vijayshanti, Saeed Jaffrey, Sadashiv Amrapurkar	Drama	Laxmikant–Pyarelal
Ek Din Achanak	Mrinal Sen	Shriram Lagoo, Shabana Azmi, Anil Chatterjee	Drama	
Elaan-E-Jung	Anil Sharma	Dharmendra, Jaya Prada	Action	
Farz Ki Jung	R. P. Swamy	Govinda, Neelam Kothari	Drama	
Gair Kanooni	Prayag Raj	Sridevi, Govinda, Rajinikanth, Kimi Katkar, Shashi Kapoor, Kader Khan	Action	Bappi Lahiri
Galiyon Ka Badshah	Sher Jung Singh	Raaj Kumar, Mithun Chakraborty, Hema Malini		
Garibon Ka Daata	Ramesh Ahuja	Mithun Chakraborty, Bhanupriya, Sumeet Saigal		
Gawaahi	Anant Balani	Shekhar Kapur, Zeenat Aman, Ranjeeta Kaur, Ashutosh Gowariker	Thriller	Uttam-Jagdish
Gentleman	Vinod R. Verma	Govinda, Anuradha Patel	Drama	
Ghar Ka Chiraag	Sikander Bharti	Rajesh Khanna, Neelam Kothari, Chunky Pandey, Shafi Inamdar, Deepika Chikhalia	Drama	Bappi Lahiri
Gharana	K. Ravi Shankar	Rishi Kapoor, Govinda, Jaya Prada	Drama	
Gola Barood	David Dhawan	Shatrughan Sinha, Chunky Pandey	Action	
Goonj	Jalal Agha	Kumar Gaurav, Juhi Chawla, Tinnu Anand	Crime	Biddu
Guru	Umesh Mehra	Mithun Chakraborty, Sridevi, Shakti Kapoor	Drama	Bappi Lahiri
Hathyar	J. P. Dutta	Dharmendra, Sanjay Dutt, Rishi Kapoor, Asha Parekh	Action	
Hero Hiralal	Ketan Mehta	Naseeruddin Shah, Sanjana Kapoor, Saeed Jaffrey, Satish Shah, Deepa Sahi	Action, comedy, drama	Babla
Hisaab Khoon Ka	Surendra Mohan	Mithun Chakraborty, Raj Babbar, Mandakini, Poonam Dhillon, Satish Shah, Saeed Jaffrey, Amrish Puri	Action, drama	Nadeem-Shravan
Hum Bhi Insaan Hain	Manivannan	Sanjay Dutt, Jackie Shroff, Raj Babbar, Jaya Prada, Neelam Kothari, Sonam, Kader Khan	Action, drama	Bappi Lahiri
Ilaaka	Aziz Sejawal	Mithun Chakraborty, Sanjay Dutt, Madhuri Dixit, Amrita Singh, Dharmendra	Action	Nadeem Shravan
Hum Intezaar Karenge	Prabhat Roy	Mithun Chakraborty, Padmini Kolhapure, Vinod Mehra, Jagdeep, Shakti Kapoor, Shafi Inamdar	Drama	Bappi Lahiri
Jaadugar	Prakash Mehra	Amitabh Bachchan, Jaya Prada, Aditya Pancholi, Amrita Singh	Drama	Kalyanji-Anandji
Jaaydaad		Raj Babbar, Madhavi, Shashi Kapoor		Anu Malik
Jaisi Karni Waisi Bharnii	Vimal Kumar	Govinda, Kimi Katkar, Asrani, Kader Khan, Shakti Kapoor	Drama	Rajesh Roshan
Jawani Ke Gunah				
Jism Ka Rishta				
Joshilaay	Sibte Hassan Rizvi	Sunny Deol, Anil Kapoor, Sridevi, Meenakshi Seshadri, Kulbhushan Kharbanda	Action	Rahul Dev Burman
Jung Baaz	Mehul Kumar	Govinda, Raaj Kumar, Danny Denzongpa, Mandakini, Prem Chopra	Action	Ravindra Jain
Jurrat	David Dhawan	Shatrughan Sinha, Kumar Gaurav	Action	
Kahan Hai Kanoon	Deepak Balraj Vij	Aditya Pancholi, Mandakini, Kimi Katkar	Action	
Kala Bazaar	Rakesh Roshan	Anil Kapoor, Jackie Shroff, Farha Naaz, Kimi Katkar	Action	Rajesh Roshan
Kamla Ki Maut	Basu Chatterjee	Pankaj Kapoor, Supriya Pathak, Roopa Ganguly	Drama	
Kanoon Apna Apna	B. Gopal	Dilip Kumar, Nutan Behl, Sanjay Dutt, Madhuri Dixit, Kader Khan, Anupam Kher	Action	Bappi Lahiri
Kanoon Ki Awaaz	R. Kumar	Shatrughan Sinha, Jaya Prada		
Kasam Suhaag Ki	Mohan Segal	Dharmendra, Rekha	Action	
Kasam Vardi Ki	Shibu Mitra	Jeetendra, Bhanupriya, Chunky Pandey	Action	
Khayal Gatha	Kumar Shahani	Rajat Kapoor, Poonam Dhillon	Drama	
Khoj	Keshu Ramsay	Naseeruddin Shah, Rishi Kapoor, Kimi Katkar	Thriller	
Khol De Meri Zuban	Dada Kondke	Dada Kondke, Mehmood		
Khooni Murda	Mohan Bhakri	Deepak Parashar, Javed Khan, Shagufta Ali	Horror	
Khuli Khidki	P. Chandrakumar	Shafeeq, Neeta Puri, Aruna Irani	Drama	
Ladaai	Deepak Shivdasani	Mithun Chakraborty, Rekha, Dimple Kapadia, Mandakini, Aditya Pancholi, Gulshan Grover, Satish Shah, Shakti Kapoor	Drama, action	Anu Malik
Ladki				
Lal Dupatta Malmal Ka	Ravinder Peepat	Sahil Chaddha, Veverly	Drama	Anand–Milind
Lashkar	Jagdish Kadar	Dev Anand, Aditya Pancholi, Sonam, Hemant Birje, Madhavi, Sumeet Saigal, Jaaved Jaffrey, Kiran Kumar	Drama	Nadeem Shravan
Love Love Love	Babbar Subhash	Aamir Khan, Juhi Chawla, Gulshan Grover, Dalip Tahil, Raza Murad	Romance, drama	Bappi Lahiri
Mahaadev	Raj N. Sippy	Vinod Khanna, Raj Babbar, Meenakshi Seshadri, Sonu Walia, Shakti Kapoor, Anupam Kher	Drama	Ilaiyaraaja
Mahal		Huma Khan, Suresh Oberoi, Sadashiv Amrapurkar	Horror	
Main Azaad Hoon	Tinnu Anand	Amitabh Bachchan, Shabana Azmi	Drama	Amar Biswas, Utpal Biswas
Main Tera Dushman	Vijay Reddy	Jackie Shroff, Jaya Prada, Sunny Deol, Sridevi, Anupam Kher	Drama, action	Laxmikant–Pyarelal
Main Tere Liye	Vijay Anand	Rajendra Kumar, Asha Parekh, Suneil Anand, Meenakshi Seshadri	Drama	Bappi Lahiri
Maine Pyar Kiya	Sooraj R. Barjatya	Salman Khan, Bhagyashree Patwardhan, Laxmikant Berde, Mohnish Behl	Romantic, drama	Raamlaxman
Meri Zabaan	Shibhu Mitra	Mithun Chakraborty, Shashi Kapoor, Farha Naaz	Action	
Mil Gayee Manzil Mujhe	Moeen Amjad	Mithun Chakraborty, Moon Moon Sen	Action	
Mitti Aur Sona	Shiv Kumar	Chunky Pandey, Sonam, Neelam Kothari	Drama	
Mohabat Ka Paigham	Padmini	Shammi Kapoor, Raj Babbar, Aditya Pancholi, Meenakshi Seshadri		
Mujrim	Umesh Mehra	Mithun Chakraborty, Madhuri Dixit, Nutan, Shakti Kapoor, Gulshan Grover	Action	Anu Malik
Na-Insaafi	Mehul Kumar	Shatrughan Sinha, Mandakini, Chunky Pandey		
Nache Nagin Gali Gali	Mohanji Prasad	Meenakshi Seshadri, Nitish Bharadwaj, Asha Lata		
Nafrat Ki Aandhi	Mehul Kumar	Dharmendra, Jeetendra, Anita Raj	Action	
Nigahen: Nagina Part II	Harmesh Malhotra	Sunny Deol, Sridevi, Anupam Kher, Gulshan Grover	Action	Laxmikant Pyarelal
Nishane Bazi	V. N. Menon	Sumeet Saigal, Sriprada, Shakti Kapoor, Kader Khan		
Oonch Neech Beech	Wasi Khan	Sanjeev Kumar, Kulbhushan Kharbanda, Shashi Kapoor, Shabana Azmi	Drama	
Paap Ka Ant	Vijay Reddy	Govinda, Madhuri Dixit, Anupam Kher, Asrani, Hema Malini, Rajesh Khanna	Action, crime	Bappi Lahiri
Parinati	Prakash Jha	Nandita Das, Surekha Sikri		
Parinda	Vidhu Vinod Chopra	Jackie Shroff, Anil Kapoor, Nana Patekar, Madhuri Dixit, Anupam Kher	Action, crime	Rahul Dev Burman
Paraya Ghar	Kalpataru	Rishi Kapoor, Jaya Prada, Raj Babbar, Aruna Irani, Madhavi, Sachin Pilgaonkar, Tanuja, Kader Khan	Drama	Laxmikant–Pyarelal
Prem Pratigyaa	Bapu	Mithun Chakraborty, Madhuri Dixit, Satish Kaushik, Vinod Mehra	Romantic, action	Bappi Lahiri
Purani Haveli	Shyam Ramsay, Tulsi Ramsay	Deepak Parashar, Amita Nangia, Neelam Mehra, Vijay Arora, Satish Shah	Horror	Ajit Singh
Raakh	Aditya Bhattacharya	Aamir Khan, Supriya Pathak, Pankaj Kapur	Action	Ranjit Barot
Raasta				
Rakhwala	K. Muralimohana Rao	Anil Kapoor, Farha Naaz, Suresh Oberoi, Prem Chopra, Shakti Kapoor, Asrani	Action	Anand–Milind
Ram Lakhan	Subhash Ghai	Anil Kapoor, Jackie Shroff, Dimple Kapadia, Madhuri Dixit, Amrish Puri, Rakhee Gulzar, Gulshan Grover	Romance, action, comedy	Laxmikant–Pyarelal
Saaya	Keshu Ramsay	Shatrughan Sinha, Poonam Dhillon		
Sachché Ká Bol-Bálá	Dev Anand	Dev Anand, Jackie Shroff, Meenakshi Seshadri, Prem Chopra, Hema Malini	Suspense	Bappi Lahiri
Sachai Ki Taqat	T. Rama Rao	Dharmendra, Govinda, Amrita Singh, Sonam, Anupam Kher, Shakti Kapoor	Action	Laxmikant–Pyarelal
Salim Langde Pe Mat Ro	Saeed Akhtar Mirza	Pavan Malhotra, Makrand Deshpande, Ashutosh Gowariker	Drama	
Santosh	Balbir Wadhavan	Manoj Kumar, Nirupa Roy, Raakhee, Prem Chopra		
Shanakht				
Shehzaade	Raj N. Sippy	Shatrughan Sinha, Kimi Katkar, Dimple Kapadia, Dharmendra, Jaya Prada	Action	Laxmikant–Pyarelal
Shukriya	A. C. Tirulokchander	Rajiv Kapoor, Amrita Singh, Pran, Beena Banerjee, Prem Chopra		
Sikka	K. Bapaiah	Jackie Shroff, Dharmendra, Dimple Kapadia, Moushumi Chatterjee	Drama	Bappi Lahiri
Sindoor Aur Bandook	Vinod Talwar	Hemant Birje, Rita Bhaduri	Action, romance	
Souten Ki Beti	Saawan Kumar	Jeetendra, Jaya Prada, Rekha	Drama	
Suryaa	Esmayeel Shroff	Raaj Kumar, Vinod Khanna, Raj Babbar, Bhanupriya, Shakti Kapoor, Alok Nath, Amrish Puri	Action	Laxmikant–Pyarelal
Taaqatwar	David Dhawan	Sanjay Dutt, Govinda, Neelam Kothari, Anita Raj	Action	
Tera Naam Mera Naam	Ramesh Talwar	Suparna Anand, Tanvi Azmi, Shafi Inamdar	Romance, comedy	
Tere Bina Kya Jeena	P.P. Ghosh	Shekhar Suman, Moon Moon Sen, Satish Shah, Raj Kiran	Drama	Jugal Kishore-Tilak Raj
Toofan	Ketan Desai	Amitabh Bachchan, Meenakshi Seshadri, Amrita Singh, Pran, Kamal Kapoor, Goga Kapoor	Action	Anu Malik
Touhean	Madan Joshi	Dimple Kapadia, Raj Babbar, Padmini Kolhapure	Drama	Bappi Lahiri
Tridev	Rajiv Rai	Sunny Deol, Naseeruddin Shah, Jackie Shroff, Madhuri Dixit, Sangeeta Bijlani, Sonam, Raza Murad, Anupam Kher, Amrish Puri	Action, thriller	Kalyanji-Anandji, Viju Shah
Tujhe Nahin Chhodunga	Iqbal Khan	Zeenat Aman, Akbar Khan, Shekhar Suman, Swapna, Suresh Oberoi, Shafi Inamdar, Amrish Puri	Action	C. P. Bhatti
Ustaad		Kimi Katkar, Vinod Khanna, Chunky Pandey	Action	Anu Malik
Vardi	Umesh Mehra	Sunny Deol, Jackie Shroff, Kimi Katkar, Madhuri Dixit	Action	Anu Malik
Vicky Dada (Telugu) / Meri Duniya (Hindi)	A. Kodandarami Reddy	Nagarjuna, Juhi Chawla, Radha	Action	Raj–Koti
Zaher				
Zakham	Irfaan Khan	Shatrughan Sinha, Chunky Pandey, Madhavi, Neelam Kothari	Action	Bappi Lahiri

== See also ==
- List of Hindi films of 1988
- List of Hindi films of 1990
