= Pahlaj Nihalani =

Indian film producer (1950–2026)

Pahlaj Nihalani (10 January 1950 – 4 June 2026) was an Indian film producer. He was the chairman of Central Board of Film Certification (CBFC) under the Ministry of Information and Broadcasting. He was also the president of the Association of Pictures and TV Programme Producers for 29 years until he resigned in 2009. He was sacked as CBFC chief on 11 August 2017 and soon Prasoon Joshi appointed CBFC Chief by Smriti Irani.

== Career ==
Pahlaj Nihalani produced his first film in 1982 named Haathkadi. His second film was Aandhi-Toofan in 1985. His third film Ilzaam in 1986, is notable for being actor Govinda's debut. His film, Aag Hi Aag in 1987, also served as the debut for Chunky Pandey. He then went on to produce Gunahon Ka Faisla in 1987, and Paap Ki Duniya in 1988. In 1989, the film Mitti Aur Sona, starring Chunky Pandey and Neelam Kothari. He has also produced films such as Shola Aur Shabnam and Aankhen.

In 2008, he made a cameo appearance in the film Halla Bol. In 2012, he directed his first film, Avatar, starring Govinda. In 2013, he said that he would help debut Govinda's daughter, Tina Ahuja.

Before the 2014 general elections, he made a YouTube video called "Har Har Modi, Ghar Ghar Modi", supporting Narendra Modi.

He took the office of the chairperson of the Central Board of Film Certification (CBFC) on 19 January 2015. Soon after his appointment he floated a new set of extremely strict guidelines under which few curse words will not be allowed even in the 'A' category. He also said that depiction of violence against women will be discouraged and it will be ensured that no content which may hurt religious sentiments will be allowed.

On 12 March 2015, two members of the CBFC, Ashoke Pandit and Chandraprakash Dwivedi, criticised the way in which Nihalani was running the organisation. On 9 July 2015, he implemented a new rule under which A-rated films were no longer allowed for television broadcast. Earlier, A-rated films could be re-cut, to achieve U or U/A rating and released on television. Nihalani justified his decision by saying that past A-rated films contained horror or violence, but most recent A-rated films have sexual themes and so they cannot be re-cut. He changed this view later and has allowed re-certification of films presently.

On 10 November 2015, a music video called "Mera Desh Mahaan", produced by Nihalani as a tribute to Prime Minister Narendra Modi was uploaded to YouTube. A shorter version of the video was played in film theatres during the interval of the film Prem Ratan Dhan Payo. The video was reported to have caused major personal embarrassment for Prime Minister Narendra Modi and was slammed by the Information and Broadcasting Ministry of India which reportedly also called for Nihalani to be sacked from his position.

After the kissing scenes in the James Bond franchise film Spectre were shortened before release, Nihalani attracted criticism on the social media. Nihalani responded to the criticism by stating that cuts were within the rules.

On 4 June 2016, he became the centre of a national debate on film censorship after he placed severe restrictions on the film, Udta Punjab. On 13 June 2016, Udta Punjab won the case against CBFC. It was allowed to release with just one cut against the 89 cuts suggested by Pahlaj Nihalani-headed censor board, upholding the freedom of speech. On 15 June 2016 udta Punjab went viral on torrent having watermark of 'For Censor' in an alleged leak from the CBFC.

On 22 June, he issued a legal notice against IIFA awards and Wizcraft (the award show event management company) for defamation and inappropriate remarks about him during a comedy skit. With his legal notice to IIFA 2017, Mr Nihlani in his capacity as allegedly denigrated Chairperson CBFC oddly sought to censor award show events which was not part of said job mandate. This only added to his erratic public persona, where he has donned avatars from "I'm a Modi bhakt", Chairman CBFC, his film persona etc. Actor Riteish Deshmukh & Wizcraft chose to apologise for the IIFA skit subsequently.

In 2017, after sacking from CBFC, Pahlaj Nihalani became the distributor of the erotic film Julie 2.

== Controversy ==
Nihalani expressed concerns regarding the existence of nudity online and on television.

According to him, there should be policy on the censorship of nude pornstar-turned-actress Sunny Leone. He also believes that movies should not contain profanity. He has said that films with profanity like Omkara and Gangs of Wasseypur, should not have been approved for release. He has claimed that normal and civilised people do not cuss in the manner depicted in films.

Nihalani has said that producers should not make controversial films like PK. Nihalani has proposed that the existing system of film ratings should be replaced by a new system. He has also condemned the protests of FTII students against the appointment of Gajendra Chauhan as the Chairman, by calling them 'anti-nationals'. In 2017, he disallowed the word "intercourse" in the trailer of Jab Harry Met Sejal citing the fact that Indian mentality is not ready for such progressiveness. He was criticised for his seemingly hypocritical stance as he had produced a film called Andaz in 1994 which had songs that glorified erections ("Khada Hai") and the bump and grind of intercourse ("Main Maal Gaadi"), the very word he wished to censor.

In August 2017, Nihalani was eventually sacked and replaced by ad-man and poet Prasoon Joshi after a controversial stint at the CBFC. In an interview soon after his removal from the post, Nihalani claimed that he was removed by the Government because he did not allow Indu Sarkar, a film about the emergency period, to be passed without cuts.

in 2024, Niki Aneja alleged that Nihalani mistreated her on set of Mr. Azad (1993)

== Death ==
Nihalani died on 4 June 2026, at the age of 76.

== Filmography ==
=== As a producer ===
Year	Film
1982	Haathkadi
1985	Aandhi-Toofan
1986	Ilzaam
1987	Aag Hi Aag
1988	Paap Ki Duniya
1988	Gunahon Ka Faisla
1989	Mitti Aur Sona
1989	Aag Ka Gola
1990	Aandhiyan
1991	First Love Letter
1992	Shola Aur Shabnam
1993	Aankhen
1994	Andaz
1996	Dil Tera Diwana
1997	Bhai Bhai
2001	Uljhan
2003	Talaash
2008	Khushboo
2017	Julie 2
2019	Rangeela Raja

=== As an actor ===
Year	Film	Role
2008	Halla Bol	as himself; special appearance

=== As distributor ===
- Puli (2015) (Hindi version only)
- Julie 2 (2018)
