= Gruhalakshmi =

Gruhalakshmi or Grihalaxmi (lit. 'household Lakshmi', transl. goodwife) may refer to:

- Grihalaxmi (1934 film), an Indian Hindi-language social family melodrama film
- Gruhalakshmi (1938 film), an Indian Telugu-language drama film
- Gruhalakshmi (1955 film), an Indian Tamil-language film
- Gruhalakshmi (1967 film), an Indian Telugu-language comedy film
- Gruhalakshmi (1992 film), an Indian Kannada-language drama film
- Grihalakshmi (magazine), an Indian women's magazine

== See also ==
- Griha Laxmi, 2025 Indian web series
