= Yunus Parvez =

Indian actor (1931/32–2007)

- Born: Yunus Parvez; 1931 or 1932; Mahend, United Provinces of Agra and Oudh, British India
- Died: 11 February 2007 (aged 75); Mumbai, Maharashtra, India
- Occupation: Actor
- Years active: 1963 – 2005
- Children: 4

Yunus Parvez (1931/1932 – 11 February 2007) was an Indian actor who played supporting roles in over 200 films from 1963 to the 2000s. He is best known for his roles in films like Garm Hava (1974), Deewaar (1975), Trishul (1978), Gol Maal (1979) and Mr. India (1987). His last film role was in Shaad Ali's hit film Bunty Aur Babli (2005).

Yunus Parvez graduated from University of Allahabad. Yunus Parvez fought 1998 Indian general election as a candidate of Samajwadi Party but could not secure many votes.

== Death ==
Yunus Parvez died in Mumbai on 11 February 2007 at the age of 75 from acute diabetes. His son Arshad Khan is married to the daughter of film actor Vikas Anand. He also had three daughters.

== Filmography ==
Year	Film	Role	Notes
1963	Kan Kan Mein Bhagwan (his debut film in 1963)	Maharaja	as Yunus Parwaiz
1965	Bharat Milap	Sumant	
1965	Saheli	Bela's Co-worker	Uncredited role
1966	Alibaba Aur 40 Chor		
1966	Pinjre Ke Panchhi	Yaseen's boss	
1968	Haseena Maan Jayegi	Laali's Father	
1968	Bambai Raat Ki Bahon Mein	Chaiwala	
1971	Pyar Ki Kahani	Gulabi Chand	
1971	Mela	Bansilal's customer	
1971	Uphaar	Banwari	
1971	Paras	Uncredited role	
1973	Kahani Kismat Ki	Chanda's Father	
1973	Zanjeer	Ridhan(Police Officer)	
1975	Deewaar	Rahim Chacha (Dockyard)	
1975	Prem Kahani	Kotwal	
1975	Khel Khel Mein	Charlie	Hotel Bar Tender
1976	Hera Pheri	Dhaniram	
1977	Farishta Ya Qatil	Minister, M.P	
1977	Yaaron Ka Yaar	Moneylender	
1977	Doosra Aadmi	Police Constable Naik	
1978	Trishul	Bhandari	Employee at Sanjeev Kumar's company
1978	Chakravyuha (1978 film)	Sikander	
1979	Inspector Eagle	Police Constable, Naik	
1979	Gol Maal	Bade Baabu	
1979	Mr. Natwarlal	Seth Fakirchand	
1979	Ahsaas	Raju Sahni	
1979	Ratnadeep		
1979	Mai Ka Lal		
1980	Do Aur Do Paanch	School Music Teacher	
1980	Aasha	Yunus Bhai	Yunus Transport Agency
1980	The Burning Train	Maulana	Train Passenger
1980	''Dostana	Gold Smuggler	Guest Role
1980	Maang Bharo Sajana	Khan Saaheb	
1980	Insaaf Ka Tarazu	Weapons Trader	
1980	Shaan	Hotel PalliHills Manager	
1980	Jwalamukhi	Colonel	
1981	Chakra	Minister	
1981	Lawaris	Mukadam (The Supervisor)	
1981	Hum Se Badkar Kaun	Rekha's father	
1981	Ek Hi Bhool	Lallulal	
1981	Kaalia	Abdul	
1982	Aagaman		
1982	Bezubaan	Seth Kalidas	
1982	Dard Ka Rishta	John	
1982	Angoor	Mansoor Miyan	
1982	Sawaal	Yunus	
1982	Dharam Kanta	Customer at Brothel	Guest role
1983	Paanchwin Manzil	Ghungroo	
1983	Avtaar	Ramdulare	
1983	Souten	Public Prosecutor	
1983	Mazdoor	Yunus Bhai	
1983	Hamar Bhauji		
1984	Lorie	Adopatation Agency Head	
1984	Sardaar	Baadshah	
1984	All Rounder	Cricket board Chairman	
1984	Mera Faisla	Head / Principal of Boys Hostel Warden	
1984	Yaadgar	Munim Govardhan	
1984	Laila	Sarwar Sheikh	
1984	Hum Hain Lajawaab	Thamani Seth	
1984	Kasam Paida Karne Wale Ki	Bansilal	
1984	Hum Do Hamare Do		
1985	Ek Chitthi Pyar Bhari	Pathan Khan Chacha	
1985	Zamana	Train Passenger	Uncredited Role
1985	Bahu Ki Awaaz	Murli	
1985	Karm Yudh		
1985	Sanjog	Lalaji	
1986	Jhanjaar		
1986	Aag Aur Shola	Groom at Marriage	
1986	Aap Ke Saath	Mr Dhingra	General Manager
1986	Adhikar	Baakelal / Baake mama	
1986	Kala Dhanda Goray Log	Chaman	
1986	Muddat		
1986	Amrit	Judge	
1986	Ghar Sansar	Kishenlal	Potential in Laws
1986	Naache Mayuri		
1986	Avinash	Superfast Detective	
1986	Mazloom	Mr Khan	
1987	Pyar Ki Jeet	Prosceuting Attorney	
1987	Sitapur Ki Geeta	Munim	
1987	Dance Dance	Film Producer	Uncredited/Guest Role
1987	Mr. India	Maniklal	
1987	Deewana Tere Naam Ka	Munim	
1987	Himmat Aur Mehanat	Mr Kalra	
1988	Aakhri Nishchay		
1988	Mera Muqaddar	Mishra, Munim	
1988	Dariya Dil		
1988	Sherni	Munshi	
1988	Shahenshah	Journalist	
1988	Qayamat Se Qayamat Tak	Truck Driver	Gives lift to Aamir and Juhi
1988	Waqt Ki Awaz	Public Prosecutor	
1988	Woh Phir Aayegi	Gopal	Hostel Peon
1988	Aag Ke Sholay	Baakelal/Lalaji	
1988	Maalamaal	Restaurant Owner	
1988	Mar Mitenge	Groom in Marriage	
1988	Ek Naya Rishta	Aarti's customer	
1989	Pyar Ke Naam Qurbaan	Defence Lawyer	
1989	Guru	Inspector Manchanda	
1989	Kahan Hai Kanoon	Dancer's Secretary	
1989	Farz Ki Jung	Pandey	
1989	Ilaaka	Member Of Parliament	
1989	Billoo Badshah	Rickshaw Owner	
1989	Jaisi Karni Waisi Bharni	Phoolchand	
1989	Mera Naseeb	Kalicharan	
1989	Gharana	Sinha	Potential In Laws
1989	Tridev	Yunus Parvez as Film Director	
1989	Gentleman	Shopkeeper	
1989	Ustaad	Seth Giridharilal	
1989	Sindoor Aur Bandook	Lalaji	
1989	Kasam Vardi Kee	Inspector Kumar	
1989	Aag Ka Gola	Rehmat Miya	Garage Owner
1989	Jurrat	Abdullah Roti	
1989	Kaisan Banaul Sansar		
1990	Baap Numbri Beta Dus Numbri	Seth Bhogadmal	
1990	Majboor	Bhakti Prasad	Bar Owner
1990	Izzatdaar	Announcer	
1990	Amiri Garibi	Mahajan	
1990	Maa Kasam Badla Loonga	Sevak Ram	
1990	Swarg	Gardener	
1990	Mera Pati Sirf Mera Hai	Lawyer, Public Prosecutor	
1990	Jeevan Ek Sanghursh	Khushiram	Shop Owner
1990	Aaj Ke Shahenshah		
1990	Amba	Banne	
1991	Pyar Ka Devta	Seth Dhanwaan	Potential in Laws
1991	Farishtay	Foreign Terrorist Black Tower Group	Cameo Role
1991	Ajooba	Bandit, Kidnapper who kidnaps Ruksana	Spl Appearance
1991	Benaam Badsha	Munshi of Jaikaal	
1991	Yeh Aag Kab Bujhegi	Father of Groom Demanding Dowry	
1991	Karz Chukana Hai	Ram Mohan Dhaniram	
1991	Pyar Hua Chori Chori	Shakura, Tribal Leader	
1991	Pratigyabadh	Lala Kedarnath	Truck Owner
1991	Ranbhoomi	Mithaiwala	
1991	Saajan	Book Publisher	Qasam Shayeri ki
1992	Lambu Dada	Money Lender	
1992	Vishwatama	Mr Verma	
1992	Vansh	Inspector Sher Bahadur	
1992	Police Officer		
1992	Sanam Aap Ki Khatir		
1992	Sapne Sajan Ke	Astrologer	Guest Role
1992	Khel	Mangatram	Jewellery Owner
1992	Bol Radha Bol	Bijlee's Father	
1992	Dil Hi To Hai	Rahmat Miya	Gold inventor
1992	Jigar	Seth	
1992	Apradhi	Banwari Seth	Landlord, House Owner
1992	Khule-Aam	Bhakridi Miyan	Sweets Store Owner (Uncredited)
1993	Pyar Pyar	Manohar	
1993	Insaniyat Ke Devta	Sukhiram	
1993	Aankhen	Seth Sukhiram	Jewellery Owner
1993	Apaatkaal	Havaldar	
1993	Hum Hain Kamaal Ke	Doctor	
1993	Aadmi	Saxena	Advocate Saxena, Rekha's Father
1993	Gopalaa	Chattanmiya	
1994	Raja Babu	Lala Sukhiram	Moneylender
1994	Dulaara		
1994	Chauraha	Ibrahim	Hotel Owner
1994	Kanoon	Jailor	
1994	Paappi Devataa	Kelaram	
1994	Mohra	Siddiqui	Editor at Jindal's newspaper
1994	Eena Meena Deeka	Hotel Owner	
1994	Vaade Iraade	Baba	
1994	Mr. Azaad	Village Zamindar	
1995	Ab Insaf Hoga	Bashir Khan	
1995	Jawab (1995 film)		
1995	Kismat	Seth Zhunzhunwala	Jewellery Owner
1995	Akele Hum Akele Tum	Mehra	Restaurant Disco Bar/ Hotel Owner
1995	Sanam Harjai	Doctor Khanna	
1996	Hahakaar	Shamsuddin	
1996	Apne Dam Par	Rahim Chacha	
1996	Loafer		
1996	Raja Ki Aayegi Baraat	Judge	
1996	Chhote Sarkar		
1997	Shapath		
1997	Zameer: The Awakening of a Soul	Minister	
1997	Daadagiri	Mamaji	
1997	Ishq	as Parsi baba	
1997	Kaun Rokega Mujhe	Munim	
1998	Hafta Vasuli	Nasir Hashmi	
1998	Jaane Jigar	Seth Babu Singh	
1998	Zulm-O-Sitam	Defence lawyer	
1998	Mehndi	Judge	
1998	Laash		
1999	Rajaji	Factory Manager	
2000	Aaghaaz	Dheerajlal	
2002	Kranti	Chief Minister	
2002	Ansh: The Deadly Part	Minister Yadav	
2003	Dil Pardesi Ho Gayaa	Ramzan Khan	
2005	Bunty Aur Babli	Hotel Owner	

== TV serial ==
Year	TV Serial	Role	Notes
1986	Bahadur Shah Zafar	Mehboob "Bua" Ali Khan	Aired on DD National.
2003-2004	Yeh Hawayein	Qazi baba	Aired on DD National.
