= Mera Haque =

Mera Haque मेरा हक़
- Promotional Poster
- Directed by: Ajay Kashyap
- Screenplay by: Ajay Kashyap
- Produced by: Bobby Raj
- Starring: Sanjay Dutt; Anita Raj
- Cinematography: V. Durga Prasad
- Edited by: David Dhawan
- Music by: Anu Malik
- Release date: 28 November 1986
- Country: India
- Language: Hindi

Mera Haque is a 1986 Indian Hindi-language action film directed by Ajay Kashyap, produced by Bobby Raj. It starred Sanjay Dutt in a dual role after the hit Jaan Ki Baazi, which had been released the previous year, with Anita Raj in pivotal roles.

== Cast ==
- Sanjay Dutt as Prince Amar Singh / Ameru Dada (Dual Role)
- Anita Raj as Bijli
- Bindu as Ranimaa
- Shakti Kapoor as Dhartiprasad
- Gulshan Grover as Diwan's Son
- Raza Murad as Police Inspector Khan / Jaggu Dada
- Ramesh Deo as Diwanji
- Jagdish Raj

== Soundtrack ==
Song	Singer
"Kala Kauwa Dekhta Hai, Dekhne Do"	Kishore Kumar, Alka Yagnik
"Chal Dhobi Ghat Hungama Karenge"	Anu Malik, Alka Yagnik
"Bijli Gira Ke"	Shabbir Kumar, Anuradha Paudwal
"Mehbooba O Mehbooba"	Shabbir Kumar
