= Aag Hi Aag =

1987 Indian Hindi film

- Poster
- Directed by: Shibu Mitra
- Written by: Ram Kelkar (story and screenplay); Faiz Salim (dialogue)
- Produced by: Pahlaj Nihalani
- Starring: Dharmendra; Moushumi Chatterjee; Shatrughan Sinha; Chunky Panday; Neelam; Richa Sharma; Shakti Kapoor; Danny Denzongpa; Vinod Mehra; Gulshan Grover
- Edited by: Nand Kumar
- Music by: Bappi Lahiri
- Distributed by: Vishal Deep International
- Release date: 3 April 1987
- Running time: 170 minutes
- Country: India
- Language: Hindi

Aag Hi Aag (translation: Fire Everywhere) is a 1987 Indian action film directed by Shibu Mitra. It stars Dharmendra, Moushumi Chatterjee, Shatrughan Sinha, Chunky Panday, Neelam, Richa Sharma, Shakti Kapoor, Danny Denzongpa in pivotal roles, along with Vinod Mehra, Gulshan Grover in guest appearances. The film surfaced as one of the biggest hits of the year, becoming the fourth-highest-grossing film of the year 1987. This film also launched Chunky Panday's career.

== Plot ==
Army Officer Bahadur Singh is recalled to duty and on the very day his wife Ganga gives birth to their son, Vijay. While back on duty, Bahadur Singh's village is attacked by bandits and his sister is raped and killed.

He goes to the police to file a complaint and instead is shunned by the police officer, especially, the corrupt Police Inspector Kundan Singh him. Enraged, Bahadur Singh takes the law in his hands, joins a gang of bandits led by Daulat Singh and changes his name to Sher Singh. One day, Sher Singh is shot by police in a village. Then Dr. Raghuveer Singh comes to treat him, but Sher Singh thinks that Raghuveer Singh is a policeman and kills him.

When he realises his mistake, he repents and surrenders to police. Years pass by and Sher Singh's son Vijay grows up and falls in love with Aarti. Aarti is the daughter of Chaudhary, none other than Daulat Singh. On the other side, Suraj Singh, the son of Raghuveer Singh, becomes ACP. Suraj has only one mission; find Sher Singh and kill him to take revenge of his father's murder. This gives more twists and turns in the story which leads to a dead end with many people to repent.

== Cast ==
- Dharmendra as Bahadur Singh / Sher Singh
- Moushumi Chatterjee as Ganga Singh
- Shatrughan Sinha as ACP Suraj Singh
- Chunky Panday as Vijay Singh
- Neelam as Aarti Chaudhary
- Richa Sharma as Tulsi Singh
- Shakti Kapoor as Gangva
- Danny Denzongpa as Daulat Singh / Chaudhary
- Om Shivpuri as Jailor
- Jagdish Raj as Judge
- Vinod Mehra as Dr. Raghuveer Singh
- Geeta Siddharth as Geeta Singh
- Pinchoo Kapoor as Mahajan of Sonapur
- Tej Sapru as Jeeva
- Mac Mohan as Bhairav
- Gulshan Grover as Inspector Kundan Singh

== Soundtrack ==
Music was composed by Bappi Lahiri.

Song	Singer
"Milne Se Pehle"	Lata Mangeshkar
"Milna Tera Aisa"	Lata Mangeshkar
"Milke Jo Na Bichhde"	Lata Mangeshkar
"Kaisi Hichki Lagli"	Asha Bhosle
"Sajan Aa Jao"	Asha Bhosle, Shabbir Kumar
"Sajan Aaja Re"	Asha Bhosle, Shabbir Kumar
"Pyar Se Hai Duniya Haseen, Pyar Nahin To Kuch Nahin"	Shabbir Kumar, Shailendra Singh, Meghna
