= Haathkadi (1982 film) =

- Poster
- Directed by: Surendra Mohan
- Written by: Ram Kelkar
- Screenplay by: Ram Kelkar
- Story by: Ram Kelkar
- Produced by: Pahlaj Nihalani
- Starring: Sanjeev Kumar; Shatrughan Sinha; Reena Roy; Ranjeeta; Rakesh Roshan; Prem Chopra
- Music by: Bappi Lahiri
- Release date: 15 January 1982
- Running time: 135 min.
- Country: India
- Language: Hindi

Haathkadi (transl. Handcuffs) is a 1982 Indian Hindi-language film directed by Surendra Mohan, starring Sanjeev Kumar, Shatrughan Sinha, Reena Roy and Ranjeeta in pivotal role. This film contains songs composed by Bappi Lahiri.

== Plot ==
Harimohan lives with his wife, Shanta, and his young son named, Sunil. He works for a lecherous male, who would like to have sex with Shanta. One night while Harimohan is sent on an errand, the boss molests Shanta, but due to bad weather, Harimohan returns early just in time to stop his boss from raping Shanta. A fight ensues between his boss and himself, and a result his boss is killed. Harimohan makes a run for it in his boss’ car, which meets with an accident, and he is believed to have been killed. This news devastates Shanta. Years go by, Shanta has got used to living a widow’s life. Sunil has grown up to be a police inspector. Sunil works undercover, and meets with Baldev Mittal, the only son of Gopaldas Mittal. Baldev is rich and arrogant, and as this results in a clash between these two young men. When a young woman, Sunita, is killed, Sunil finds evidence linking her death with Baldev, and he arrests him, and has him tried for murder. What Sunil does not know that Gopaldas Mittal has an alias – that of Saakhia – a notorious and influential gangster who will never let anyone stand in his way. Sunil also does not know that Saakhia is none other than his own biological father, who is still alive, and has taken to a life of crime.

== Cast ==
- Sanjeev Kumar as Harimohan / Rai Bahadur Gopaldas Mittal / Saakhiya
- Shatrughan Sinha as SP Sunil / Bholanath Banarasi
- Rakesh Roshan as Baldev Mittal
- Reena Roy as Rosy
- Ranjeeta as Sunita
- Prem Chopra as Dr. Ramesh
- Jeevan as Suraj
- Madan Puri as Harimohan's Boss
- Simi Garewal as Pammi Mittal
- Ramesh Deo as Ambernath
- Seema Deo as Shanta
- Mazhar Khan as Robert
- Kanhaiyalal as Raghuveer

== Songs ==
Lyrics by Majrooh Sultanpuri.

Song	Singer
"Disco Station Disco"	Asha Bhosle
"Ek Baar Milke, Jaye Nahin Dil Se, Kya Pyari Surat Hai"	Asha Bhosle, Kishore Kumar
"Jeeyo Jeeyo Pyare, Kya Thath Hai Tumhare"	Asha Bhosle, Kishore Kumar
"Kabhi Tum Aag Ho, Kabhi Tum Pani, Hay Ka Cheez Ho"	Asha Bhosle, Kishore Kumar
