= Bhaskar Shetty murder case =

2016 murder of an Indian businessman

- Born: 1964
- Died: 2016 (aged 51–52); Udupi
- Cause of death: Homicide (strangulation)
- Body discovered: Udupi
- Spouse: Rajeshwari
- Children: Navaneeth Shetty
- Parent: Gulabi Shetty

Bhaskar Shetty was a well-known businessman from Udupi, who has business in Saudi Arabia and a hotel in Udupi, a resident of Indrali Udupi was murdered on July 28, 2016 allegedly for property issues. The murder was one of the sensational cases which occurred in history of Twin districts of Mangalore and Udupi. Shetty's murder has a strong resemblance with the infamous Sheena Bora murder case in Maharashtra.

== Case history ==
Shetty went missing from his house from Udupi on July 28, 2016. His mother Gulabi lodged a missing person complaint on July 29, 2016.

According to the investigators, here's how the murder was carried out:

- On July 28, 2016, at about 3 pm IST, Shetty comes home from his Durga Hotel in Udupi and goes for a bath.
- His wife Rajeshwari, son Navaneeth Shetty and Niranjan Bhat were present at home.
- When he comes out of the bathroom he was pepper sprayed and hit on his head using a rod by Rajeshwari and made to drink pesticides.
- His hands and legs were tied up, he is dunked in a bathtub to drown.
- The three then dump the body in the boot of the car and take it to Niranjan Bhat's yaga shale (where homas are done), at his house in Nandikate.
- The body was burned in Homa kunda using Ghee, camphor and petrol.
- His ash and bones as well the brick of kunda were thrown into the Palli river in an attempt to destroy evidence.
- His mother Gulabi Shetty lodged a missing person complaint on July 29, 2016.
- Shetty's wife Rajeshwari (46) and son Navaneeth Shetty (20) were arrested by the police for the murder.
- Niranjan Bhat (astrologer), who was allegedly having an affair with Rajeshwari was arrested from Nitte on August 8, 2016, for his alleged role in the murder.
- On August 10, 2016, police finds the bones in Palli river and sent to forensic lab for detailed examination after the arrest of Srinivas Bhat, father of Niranjan, and Raghavendra, who drove the remains into the river.

== Arrest and aftermath ==
A 1,300-page charge sheet was filed at the Udupi court against five accused: Rajeshwari Shetty (wife), Navaneeth Shetty (son), Niranjan Bhat (astrologer), Srinivas Bhat (father of Niranjan Bhat), and Driver Raghavendra. Three main accused—Rajeshwari (wife), Navaneeth (son), and Niranjan Bhat (astrologer)--were sent to judicial custody until November 30, 2016 and non-bailable warrant was issued against Srinivas Bhat and Raghavendra.

- Niranjan Bhat attempted suicide on 9 August 2016 by swallowing his diamond ring and two ear studs during Police custody in Manipal Police Station.He was admitted to Ajjarkad hospital, where his condition was stable and he recovered.
- The District and Sessions Court Udupi on 28 December 2016 rejected the bail plea of Rajeshwari Shetty.
- The High Court of Karnataka on 13 February 2017 dismissed the bail application filed by Rajeshwari Shetty, main accused in the murder of her husband, Bhaskar Shetty.
- Supreme Court of India rejected the bail plea of the accused on 11 August 2017
- Supreme Court of India granted conditional bail to Rajeshwari on 23 April 2018.
- The district court has granted interim bail to Niranjan Bhat, an accused in the Bhaskar Shetty murder case so that he could perform the last rites of his father on 24 June 2020 on condition that he shall execute a Rs 5 lakh bond and surrender himself before the court on or before July 7. Final Verdict in Bhaskar Shetty Murder case is on May 29, 2021

== Accused assaulted in prison ==
On September 12, 2017, The two main accused Navaneeth Shetty and Niranjan Bhat were assaulted by 10 inmates in "B" Block of Mangaluru District Prison. Both were admitted to Wenlock district hospital for treatment.

== Court judgment ==
The Udupi Principal District and Sessions Court on 8 June 2021 convicted three accused Bhaskar Shetty's wife Rajeshwari Shetty, son Navaneeth Shetty and astrologer Niranjan Bhat of Nandalike with life imprisonment.
