= Ilzaam =

1986 film by Shibu Mitra

- Poster
- Directed by: Shibu Mitra
- Written by: Ram Kelkar; Dr. Rahi Masoom Reza; Faiz Saleem
- Produced by: Pahlaj Nihalani
- Starring: Shashi Kapoor; Shatrughan Sinha; Govinda; Neelam; Anita Raj
- Cinematography: Nadeem Khan
- Edited by: Nand Kumar
- Music by: Bappi Lahiri
- Distributed by: Vishaldeep International
- Release date: 28 February 1986
- Running time: 165 minutes
- Country: India
- Language: Hindi

Ilzaam (transl. Accusation) is a 1986 Indian Hindi-language drama film directed by Shibu Mitra and produced by Pahlaj Nihlani, starring Govinda in his film debut alongside Neelam, Shatrughan Sinha, Anita Raj, Shashi Kapoor and Prem Chopra. Originally the film was titled as Jhoota Ilzaam. The film was a box-office hit.

== Plot ==
Orphaned and poor Ajay meets the wealthy Aarti, and both fall in love. Their hopes to marry are dashed when Aarti's dad, Dhanraj, opposes Ajay and Aarti's marriage until he gets wealthy. Ajay disappears from Aarti's life, and Aarti is heartbroken but does not get Ajay out of her mind. Several months later, she meets with a young man who looks like Ajay, but claims that he is Vijay. She finds out that he lives with his mother, sister, and an older brother, Inspector Suraj Prasad. While investigating an unrelated matter, Suraj Prasad finds out that Ajay is a career criminal, who sings and dances on the streets, distracting people, while his colleagues break into apartments and rob the residents.

== Cast ==
- Shashi Kapoor as Police Commissioner Ranjit Singh
- Shatrughan Sinha as Inspector Suraj Prasad
- Govinda as Ajay Kumar / Vijay
- Neelam as Aarti
- Anita Raj as Kamal
- Ramesh Deo as Inspector Yadav
- Prem Chopra as Dhanraj
- Raj Kiran as Satish Singh
- Gita Siddharth as Suraj Prasad's Mother
- Pinchoo Kapoor as Fakirchand
- Tej Sapru as Shivaji Hall Manager and robbery gang leader
- Manik Irani as Billa
- Sudhir as Rocky
- Mac Mohan as Macky
- Satish Kaul as Rahim Khan, Truck Driver
- Gurbachan Singh as henchman
- Kedarnath Sehgal as Police Inspector
- Shivraj as Kamal's Father
- Shraddha Verma as Laxmi Prasad

== Soundtrack ==
Lyrics: Anjaan

Song	Singer
"I Am A Street Dancer"	Amit Kumar
"Pehle Pehle Pyar Ki, Kya Hai Yeh Deewangi" (Slow)	Amit Kumar, Asha Bhosle
"Pehle Pehle Pyar Ki, Kya Hai Yeh Deewangi" (Fast)	Amit Kumar, Asha Bhosle
"Pyar Kiya Hai, Pyar Karenge, Duniya Se Ab To Hum Na Darenge"	Shabbir Kumar, Asha Bhosle
"Main Aaya Tere Liye"	Nazia Hassan, Zoheb Hassan
"Da Da Dai Dadai Dadai"	S. Janaki
