= Khatron Ke Khiladi (1988 film) =

1988 film by T. Rama Rao

- Directed by: T. Rama Rao
- Written by: M. D. Sunder; Faiz Saleem
- Produced by: V. B. Rajendra Prasad
- Starring: Dharmendra; Sanjay Dutt; Suresh Oberoi; Madhuri Dixit; Neelam
- Cinematography: S. Gopal Reddy
- Edited by: A. Sanjeevi
- Music by: Laxmikant–Pyarelal
- Release date: 27 May 1988
- Running time: 156 min.
- Country: India
- Language: Hindi

Khatron Ke Khiladi (transl. Daredevils) is a 1988 Indian Hindi-language action film directed by T. Rama Rao and produced by V. B. Rajendra Prasad. It stars Dharmendra, Sanjay Dutt, Chunky Panday, Madhuri Dixit, Neelam in pivotal roles. The film was remade in Telugu as Simha Swapnam.

== Plot ==
Honest truck driver Balwant watches helplessly as the owners of the trucking company he works for maul his brother, Jaswant, to death. When he lodges a complaint with the police, the inspector instead arrests him for this crime; the trucking company owners then burn his house, killing his pregnant wife, Sumati. Years later, Balwant, who now calls himself Karamvir, operates a court called 'Teesri Adalat' by sentencing wrong-doers to death in a judge and executor style. However, he is unaware that Sumati is still alive and has given birth to twins Rajesh and Mahesh; while Mahesh was separated at birth and grew up with Inspector Ram Avtar and his wife, Rajesh is taking care of his mother as she loses her mental balance in the trauma. Rajesh and Mahesh do get to unite as the girls Kavita and Sunita, whom they are in love with, are linked to each other. After a few misjudgments of situations at hand, Rajesh and Mahesh decide that they will bring Teesri Adalat to the court of law - at any cost.

== Cast ==
- Dharmendra as Balwant / Karamveer / Teesri Adalat
- Sanjay Dutt as Rajesh
- Chunky Panday as Mahesh
- Madhuri Dixit as Kavita
- Neelam as Sunita
- Shakti Kapoor as Jaichand
- Sadashiv Amrapurkar as Balveer
- Paresh Rawal as Ranveer
- Raza Murad as Minister Parshuram
- Gulshan Grover as Bahadur
- Sharat Saxena as Inspector Amarnath / Daku Jwala
- Om Shivpuri as ACP Tandon
- Shafi Inamdar as Inspector Ram Avtar
- Satyendra Kapoor as Inspector Narayan
- Chandrashekhar as DCP Harish Thakur
- Ram Mohan as Dr. Prakash
- Anjana Mumtaz as Sumati
- Siva Krishna as Jaswant
- Pradeep Shakti

== Soundtrack ==
Lyrics: Anand Bakshi

#	Song	Singer
1	"Hum Dono Mein Kuch Na Kuch Hai, Jaane Uska Kya Naam Hai"	Kishore Kumar, Alka Yagnik
2	"Koi Shair, Koi Pagal, Koi Bepeer Ban Jaaye"	Mohammed Aziz
3	"Tumse Bana Mera Jeevan, Sundar Sapan Salona" (Happy)	Mohammed Aziz, Anuradha Paudwal
4	"Tumse Bana Mera Jeevan, Sundar Sapan Salona" (Sad)	Mohammed Aziz, Anuradha Paudwal
5	"Teri Meri Pyarbhari Baaton Mein, Aag Lag Gayi Barsaaton Mein"	Mohammed Aziz, Anuradha Paudwal
6	"Hip Hip Hurray, Premyion Ke Dil Panchhi Bankar Ude"	Amit Kumar, Mohammed Aziz, Anuradha Paudwal, Kavita Krishnamurthy,
