= Kasam (2001 film) =

2001 film by Shibu Mitra

- DVD Cover
- Directed by: Shibu Mitra
- Screenplay by: Faiz Saleem
- Dialogues by: Madan Joshi
- Story by: Juthika Mittra
- Produced by: Vikas Vaswani; Veena Sharma
- Starring: Sunny Deol; Naseeruddin Shah; Chunky Pandey; Neelam; Sonu Walia; Hemant Birje; Ahmed Sharif
- Cinematography: Sushil Chopra
- Edited by: Heera Singh
- Music by: Songs: Viju Shah; Score: Guru Sharma
- Production company: Manish Films
- Release date: 12 October 2001 (India)
- Running time: 137 minutes
- Country: India
- Language: Hindi
- Budget: ₹17 million
- Box office: ₹23 million

Kasam (transl. Oath) is a 2001 Indian Hindi-language action film directed by Shibu Mitra, starring Sunny Deol, Naseeruddin Shah, Chunky Pandey, Neelam and Sonu Walia.

Produced and released by Manish Films in India on 12 October 2001, the film was panned by critics and grossed ₹23 million in the box office.

== Plot ==
In aid of seeking revenge for his dad's death, against a bandit called Kala Daku, Shankar teams up with two men: a police inspector, Mangal and a run away convict, Vijay. Shankar makes his living by driving a truck while Vijay and Mangal masquerade as villagers to surface as saviors to protect the village against Kala's gang. And then Kala and his men abduct Vijay; now Mangal and the entire police force will have to negotiate with Kala to let Vijay off in exchange for the landlord's son. How Shankar takes revenge from the culprits, forms the rest of the story.

== Cast ==
- Sunny Deol as Shankar
- Naseeruddin Shah as Mangal Singh
- Chunky Pandey as Vijay
- Neelam as Bindiya
- Sonu Walia as Bijli
- Hemant Birje as Police Inspector
- Ranjeet as Hari Singh
- Sharat Saxena as Vikram
- Sadashiv Amrapurkar as Kala Daku
- Parikshat Sahni as Thakur Jaswant Singh
- Anjana Mumtaz as Mrs. Jaswant Singh
- Ahmed Sharif as Thakur Sahab
- Bob Christo as John

== Music and soundtrack ==
The music for the songs of the film was composed by Viju Shah and the lyrics of the songs were penned by Anand Bakshi. The background score of the movie was provided by Guru Sharma.

#	Title	Singer(s)
1	"Chehra Tera Kitabh"	Udit Narayan, Alka Yagnik
2	"Jee Huzoor"	Mangal Singh
3	"Kitna Sunder Tha Hai Sapna"	Kumar Sanu
4	"O Pardesi Babu"	Sudesh Bhosle, Sadhana Sargam
5	"O Sahiba"	Udit Narayan, Kavita Krishnamurthy
6	"Teri Dhapli Meri Payal"	Kumar Sanu, Sadhana Sargam
