= Indian Film and TV Producers Council =

Industry association in India

- Founded: 1990; 36 years ago
- Location: India
- Key people: Sajid Nadiadwala (President)
- Website: www.iftpc.com
- Formerly called: Association of Motion Pictures and TV Programme Producers (AMPTPP)

The Indian Film and TV Producers Council (IFTPC) is a trade association in India. It was previously known as the Association of Motion Pictures and TV Programme Producers (AMPTPP).

Pahlaj Nihalani was the president of the then AMPTPP for 29 years until 2009.

As of 2015, its president was Sajid Nadiadwala.

== See also ==
- Federation of Western India Cinema Employees
- Cinema of India
