= Tirchhi Topiwale =

- Directed by: Nadeem Khan
- Screenplay by: Babu Latiwala
- Story by: Babu Latiwala
- Produced by: Babu Latiwala
- Starring: Chunky Pandey; Monica Bedi
- Cinematography: Nadeem Khan
- Edited by: Vasant Narvekar
- Music by: Anand Raaj Anand
- Production company: Bombino Video
- Release date: 11 September 1998 (India)
- Running time: 2 hours 24 min
- Country: India
- Language: Hindi

Tirchhi Topiwale is a 1998 Bollywood musical comedy-drama film directed by Nadeem Khan and produced by Babu Latiwala. It stars Chunkey Pandey and Monica Bedi in pivotal roles. The film's title was inspired by a song from Tridev (1989).

== Plot ==
Two businessmen promise that they will arrange a marriage between their children and each other. But the children are already in love with someone else.

== Cast ==
- Chunky Pandey as Anand
- Inder Kumar as Amit Mehra
- Monica Bedi as Sanam Oberoi
- Rituparna Sengupta as Sikha Oberoi(Sanam's elder sister)
- Kader Khan as Mr. Oberoi (Sanam's dad)
- Reema Lagoo as Sumitra Oberoi
- Satish Shah as Gokul Pai
- Alok Nath as Alok Lucknowi
- Himani Shivpuri as Mrs. Alok Lucknowi
- Johnny Lever as Kadak K. Pillay
- Anupam Kher as Mr. Mehra
- Rana Jung Bahadur as Trikaal
- Arjun Firoz Khan
- Shehzad Khan
- Shail Chaturvedi
- Jackie Shroff as Jackie Shroff (Himself)

== Soundtrack ==
Tirchhi Topiwale

Soundtrack album by Anand Raaj Anand
- Released: 1997
- Length: Bombino Music

#	Title	Singer(s)
1	"Hayo Rabba Pyar Ho Gaya"	Altaf Raja
2	"Tirchhi Topiwale"	Abhijeet, Parvati Khan
3	"Daddy Mera Bada Pareshan"	Abhijeet
4	"Dil Ke Gate Ki"	Abhijeet, Alka Yagnik
5	"Murli Ke Bapu"	Sapna Awasthi, Jyoti
6	"Shehnaiyon Ke Mele"	Udit Narayan, Abhijeet
