= Kaun Rokega Mujhe =

- Directed by: Kamal Raj Bhasin
- Written by: Madan Joshi (dialogues)
- Screenplay by: Suroor Subhash
- Story by: Kamal Raj Bhasin
- Produced by: Kamal Raj Bhasin
- Starring: Chunky Pandey; Nagma
- Cinematography: Damodar Naidu
- Edited by: Nasir Hakim
- Music by: Laxmikant-Pyarelal
- Production company: Kamal Raj International
- Release date: 1997

Kaun Rokega Mujhe (transl. Who will stop me?) is a 1997 Hindi-language action thriller film of Bollywood, directed and produced by Kamal Raj Bhasin and starring Chunky Pandey and Nagma in the lead roles. This film was released on 12 December 1997 under the banner of Kamal Raj International. The music directors of the film were Laxmikant–Pyarelal.

== Plot ==
Mohan falls in love with Sudha, and they decide to marry. But local powerful Thakur Ranjit Singh makes a false murder case against Mohan and sends him into jail. Sudha's brother Bhola believes that Mohan is innocent and goes to find the real culprit. Bhola meets a lady named Nisha. Both search for a witness of Mohan's innocence, but fail each and every time because someone behind the scenes is killing those witnesses one by one. Finally, they get the help of one police inspector Iqbal.

== Cast ==
- Chunky Pandey as Bhola
- Nagma as Nisha
- Prem Chopra as Thakur Ranjit Singh
- Sudha Chandran as Sudha
- Govinda as Inspector Iqbal
- Beena Banerjee as Debi
- Kunika as Radha
- Ranjeet as Narayan Das
- Shashi Puri as Mohan
- Pran as Kashinath
- Sadashiv Amrapurkar
- Gulshan Grover
- Shakti Kapoor
- Asrani
- Kiran Kumar
- Yunus Parvez
- Narendra Bedi
- Rajendra Nath

== Soundtrack ==
1. "Badhaai Ho Badhaai" - Mohammed Aziz, Shailendra Singh
2. "Chhora Badnam Hua" - Sudesh Bhosale
3. "Dushmanon Ki Badi Meharban" - Shailendra Singh, Kavita Krishnamurthy
4. "Haath Mera Pakadne Se Pahle" - Kavita Krishnamurthy
5. "Haath Mera Pakadne Se Pahle v2" - Kavita Krishnamurthy
6. "Suit Mera Americawala" - Sudesh Bhosale, Alka Yagnik
7. "Zindagi Hai Nasha" - Neisha
