= Naam O Nishan =

- Directed by: Ajay Kashyap
- Screenplay by: Santosh Saroj
- Produced by: B.P. Verma
- Starring: Sanjay Dutt; Amrita Singh
- Cinematography: K. V. Ramanna
- Edited by: David Dhawan
- Music by: Anu Malik
- Release date: 15 May 1987
- Country: India
- Language: Hindi

Naam O Nishan is a 1987 Indian Hindi-language action thriller film directed by Ajay Kashyap and produced by B.P. Verma. It stars Sanjay Dutt, Amrita Singh in the lead roles.

== Plot ==
Suraj lives a wealthy lifestyle with his Police Inspector dad, Sangram, mom, and sister, Chutki. He joins the Police Force, and is appointed a Police Inspector. Shortly after his appointment, his dad brings Suraj's paternal uncle, Jaspal Singh, who subsequently moves in with them. When the time comes for Chutki's marriage, her to-be father-in-law, a Police Officer himself, stops the marriage proceedings as he would like Sangram to remove Jaspal from the Singh's household. When Sangram refuses, the marriage is canceled. When Suraj questions this, Sangram refuses to provide any answers. That night Jaspal leaves without telling anyone. Suraj meets with and falls in love with Vanisha. Subsequently, Suraj is suspended from active duty, arrested and charged with killing a man named Anthony. A woman named Geeta comes to his rescue with evidence to prove his innocence. Subsequently, Geeta is killed, and Suraj swears to bring in the culprit at any and all costs. Little does Suraj know that his girlfriend, Vanisha, is plotting to kill him; Sangram is not his real father, and he was sired by a bandit known only as Jarnail Singh. Things get worse when Jarnail's rival, Jabhar alias Zoravar, finds out about Suraj's biological lineage and sets forth to have him killed - by any and all means possible.

== Cast ==
- Shashi Kapoor as Inspector Sangram Singh
- Sanjay Dutt as Inspector Suraj Singh
- Amrita Singh as Vanisha
- Kader Khan as Thakur Jarnail Singh / Jaspal Singh
- Nirupa Roy as Thakurain Champa Singh
- Suresh Oberoi as Zorawar / Jabhar
- Seema Deo as Mrs. Sangram Singh
- Viju Khote as Inspector Sharma
- Kamal Kapoor as Police Commissioner
- Chandrashekhar as Judge
- Praveen Kumar as Jagira

== Soundtrack ==
Lyrics: Indeevar

Song	Singer
"O Tera Naam Kya Hai, O Tujhe Kaam Kya Hai"	Kishore Kumar, Alka Yagnik
"Naam O Nishan"	Asha Bhosle
"Peena Hai Agar"	Asha Bhosle
"Sona Main Sona"	Asha Bhosle
