= Na-Insaafi =

- Directed by: Mehul Kumar
- Written by: Mehul Kumar
- Produced by: Arjun Moolchadani
- Starring: Shatrughan Sinha; Chunky Pandey; Mandakini; Sonam
- Music by: Bappi Lahiri
- Release date: 30 June 1989
- Country: India
- Language: Hindi

Na-Insaafi is a 1989 Bollywood film directed and produced by Mehul Kumar and it stars Shatrughan Sinha, Chunky Pandey, Mandakini, Sonam in lead roles.

== Plot ==
Widowed Judge Kedarnath Sinha lives a happy life with two sons, CBI Inspector Vijay, and College-going Sonu. Vijay forgot, but is haunted by an incident in his youth that he can not clearly remember... In the past, on his fifth birthday party was interrupted by the crazed criminal Billa and his crew. Billa was sentenced by arrested by DCP Ravi Khanna and sentenced by Judge Kedarnath Sinha, for which he swore revenge. Billa fatally castrates DCP Ravi Khanna and then cuts off Kedarnath's hand. He then abducts and rapes Sharada Khanna, leaving her pregnant, something doctors have told her would be fatal...

In the present Vijay is effected by seeing glimpses of this and has flashbacks. Vijay actually Vijay has vowed to one day bring Billa to justice and becomes a CBI officer. He has a little brother named Sonu. On his twenty fifth birthday, once Kedarnath tells him that he is Sharada's and Billa's son, Sonu is shocked by the revelation. Sonu accepts this reality and leaves the Sinha home.

Little do the two brothers from the same mother realize that Billa is now the white collared Daaga, who is known to the people of India as a businessman; however it is all a cover as he is now a crime lord. Will the two brothers bring down Daaga or go their own ways and clash?

== Cast ==
- Shatrughan Sinha as CBI Inspector Vijay Sinha
- Chunky Pandey as Sonu
- Mandakini as Kamli
- Sonam as Rita D'Souza
- Aruna Irani as Sharada Khanna
- Sujit Kumar as DCP Ravi Khanna
- Kiran Kumar as Numbari Kaalia
- Raza Murad as Shakaal
- Gulshan Grover as Teja
- Amrish Puri as Billa / Daaga
- Om Shivpuri as Judge Kedarnath Sinha
- Asrani as Khadak Singh
- Viju Khote as John D'Costa
- Mac Mohan as Gopal
- Sudhir as John D'Souza
- Sudhir Dalvi as Saint
- Jagdish Raj as Police Chief

== Soundtrack ==
Lyrics: Anjaan

Song	Singer
"Ram Laxman Ki Jodi"	Nitin Mukesh, Udit Narayan
"Ham Beqarar Hain"	S. Janaki, Amit Kumar
"Main Hoon Babusha"	Alisha Chinai, Mohammed Aziz, Sudesh Bhosle
"Bombai Ki Kasam"	Alisha Chinai
"Aankhon Se Chhune Do"	Anupama Deshpande
"Ram Laxman Ki Jodi" (Sad)	Nitin Mukesh, Udit Narayan
