= Zahreelay =

1990 film by Jyotin Goel

- Theatrical release poster
- Directed by: Jyotin Goel
- Written by: Mushtaq Jalili (dialogues)
- Screenplay by: Nusrat Sayed
- Story by: Jyotin Goel
- Produced by: Jyotin Goel
- Starring: Jeetendra; Sanjay Dutt; Chunky Pandey; Juhi Chawla
- Cinematography: Chaman K Bajoo
- Edited by: Omkar Bhakri
- Music by: Anand–Milind
- Production company: Goel Screen Crafts
- Release date: 25 January 1990
- Running time: 157 minutes
- Country: India
- Language: Hindi

Zahreelay (transl. Poisonous) is a 1990 Hindi-language action film, produced and directed by Jyotin Goel under the Goel Screen Crafts banner. It stars Jeetendra, Sanjay Dutt, Chunky Pandey, and Juhi Chawla in the pivotal roles, with music composed by Anand–Milind. The film was a semi hit at the box office with Sanjay Dutt's Raaka Character getting a lot of praise by the critics and audience.

== Cast ==
- Jeetendra as Captain Jaswant Kumar
- Sanjay Dutt as Raaka / Rakesh Rai
- Chunky Pandey as Raju
- Juhi Chawla as Chamki
- Bhanupriya as Seema
- Vinita as Shabnam
- Kiran Kumar as Taneja
- Sharat Saxena as Peter Gonsalves
- Shafi Inamdar as A.V. Razdan
- Sudhir as Jaichand Khurana

== Soundtrack ==
| # | Song | Singer |
|---|---|---|
| 1 | "Dhoond Rahee Thi" | Amit Kumar, Sadhana Sargam |
| 2 | "Batti Lal Haree Na" | Mohammed Aziz, Sadhana Sargam |
| 3 | "Pal Mein Khafa Kabhi" | Mohammed Aziz, Anuradha Paudwal |
| 4 | "Aaj Mere Qatil Ki" | Mohammed Aziz, Anuradha Paudwal |
