= Kasam Vardi Ki =

Kasam Vardi Kee
- Theatrical release poster
- Directed by: Shibu Mitra
- Written by: Faiz Salim(dialogues); Anjaan (lyrics)
- Produced by: B. S. Shaad; Jimmy Narula
- Starring: Jeetendra; Chunky Panday; Bhanupriya; Farah
- Cinematography: Nadeem Khan
- Edited by: Subhash Sehgal
- Music by: Bappi Lahiri
- Production company: BRAR Combines
- Release date: 10 November 1989
- Running time: 144 minutes
- Country: India
- Language: Hindi

Kasam Vardi Kee (transl. Oath On Uniform) is a 1989 Hindi-language action film, produced by B.S. Shaad, Jimmy Narula on BRAR Combines banner and directed by Shibu Mitra. The film stars Jeetendra, Chunky Panday and Bhanupriya, Farah with music composed by Bappi Lahiri.

== Cast ==
- Jeetendra as Inspector Vijay Singh
- Chunky Panday as Inspector Ajay Singh
- Bhanupriya as Aarti
- Farah as Pooja
- Raj Kiran as Vicky
- Raza Murad as Babla
- Kiran Kumar as Janardan
- Anupam Kher as Chaddha
- Vikram Gokhale as Minister Parshuram
- Tej Sapru as Inspector Rakesh Mehra
- Viju Khote as Constable Chiranjeet
- Yunus Parvez as Inspector Kumar
- Om Shivpuri as Police Commissioner Ajit Kumar
- Satish Kaul as Jaikishan "Jackie"
- Disco Shanti as Nisha
- Manik Irani as Heera

== Soundtrack ==
Lyrics: Anjaan

Song	Singer
"Aayi Main Aayi, Dil Lene Aayi"	Asha Bhosle
"Dil Kahin Kho Gaya, Main Kahin Kho Gayi"	Asha Bhosle, Mohammed Aziz
"Pyar Mein Kya Ghabrana, Pyar Mein Kya Sharmana"	Asha Bhosle, Amit Kumar
"Jab Tak Dil Dhadkega, Tujhse Pyar Karega" (Happy)	Amit Kumar, S. Janaki
"Jab Tak Dil Dhadkega" (Sad)	S. Janaki
"Anchan Anchan Kare Re Dil"	Alisha Chinoy
