= Zakham (1989 film) =

- LP Vinyl Records Cover
- Directed by: Irfaan Khan
- Written by: Faiz-Saleem
- Produced by: T.Manoj; Irfaan Khan
- Starring: Shatrughan Sinha; Chunky Pandey; Neelam; Madhavi
- Cinematography: Rajan Kothari
- Music by: Bappi Lahiri
- Release date: 1 December 1989
- Running time: 135 minutes
- Country: India
- Language: Hindi

Zakham is a 1989 Indian Hindi-language feature film directed by Irfaan Khan for Disha Films. The film stars Shatrughan Sinha, Chunky Pandey, Neelam, Madhavi. Bappi Lahiri composed the music for the film.

== Cast ==
- Shatrughan Sinha as Arjun
- Chunky Pandey as Vijay
- Neelam as Aarti
- Madhavi as Asha
- Bindu as Mary
- Anupam Kher as Durjan
- Om Shivpuri as Jagat

== Soundtrack ==
Zakham

Film score by Bappi Lahiri
- Released: 1989
- Genre: Feature film soundtrack
- Label: Venus

Song	Singer
"Aukat Meri Kya"	Bappi Lahiri
"Dang Ding Dang"	Bappi Lahiri, Asha Bhosle
"Maalik Mere"	Mohammed Aziz, Asha Bhosle
"Mummy Mummy"	Amit Kumar, Alisha Chinai
"Zakham Laga"	Nandu Bhende
