= Paap Ki Duniya =

1988 film

Paap ki Duniya
- Theatrical release poster
- Directed by: Shibu Mitra
- Screenplay by: Ram Kelkar
- Dialogues by: Faiz Salim
- Story by: Ram Kelkar
- Produced by: Pahlaj Nihalani
- Starring: Sunny Deol; Chunky Panday; Neelam; Pran; Danny Denzongpa; Shakti Kapoor
- Cinematography: Siba Mishra
- Edited by: Nand Kumar
- Music by: Bappi Lahiri
- Production company: Vishaldeep International Combine
- Distributed by: Vishaldeep International Combine
- Release date: 18 March 1988
- Running time: 170 minutes
- Country: India
- Language: Hindi
- Box office: ₹9.5 crore (equivalent to ₹109 crore or US$11 million in 2023)

Paap ki Duniya (transl. World of Sin) is a 1988 Indian crime action film directed by Shibu Mitra. The movie stars Sunny Deol, Chunky Panday, Neelam, Pran and Danny Denzongpa. The film was a blockbuster at the box-office and one of the biggest hit bollywood movies of 1988

== Plot ==
The story begins with Shamsher Singh, an honest and upright police officer. His happiness is shattered when he learns that his sister has fallen in love with and married Pasha, a ruthless and notorious criminal whom he had recently arrested. Rejected by her brother, Shamsher's sister eventually returns, bruised and dying, with her newborn son. She reveals that Pasha only used her to manipulate her brother. When that scheme of his failed, he sold her to a brothel. She begs Shamsher to raise her child. She dies in his arms.

Still hungry for revenge against Shamsher, Pasha kidnaps Shamsher's own son, Ashok, and renames him Suraj. He raises Suraj in the world of crime, teaching him to be a professional thief and a master of disguise. Meanwhile, Shamsher, in a case of ironic role reversal, raises Pasha's biological son, naming him Vijay, and trains him to be a police inspector.

Suraj is unaware of his true identity. Raised by the Pasha, he grows up to be a charismatic and highly skilled professional thief. He is an expert in theft and heists, carrying out Pasha's orders without questioning his actions. He is a tough, street-smart individual, embodying a life of "paap" (sin).

Suraj's life takes a dramatic turn when he meets and falls in love with Aarti. She is an innocent and kind-hearted girl who is drawn to his charming personality. When she learns about his life of crime, she is heartbroken and refuses to be with him unless he gives up his criminal ways. Inspired by Aarti's love and her faith in him, Suraj decides to leave his life of crime. He starts working honestly to earn a living. However, this decision puts him directly in conflict with his past. He is pursued by Inspector Vijay, who also happens to be in one-sided love with Aarti and is unaware that Suraj is his long-lost cousin. The two brothers, raised as rivals, are now on a collision course, with Suraj trying to prove his innocence and Vijay determined to bring him to justice.

The story’s climax builds on the dramatic irony of the situation. Suraj must now confront and defeat Pasha and protect his family.

== Cast ==
- Sunny Deol as Ashok Singh / Suraj
- Chunky Panday as Inspector Vijay – Pasha’s biological son
- Neelam as Aarti – Suraj’s girlfriend
- Pran as Jailor Shamsher Singh – Suraj’s father
- Danny Denzongpa as Pasha
- Shakti Kapoor as Kisna
- Kanwarjit Paintal as Pritam
- Sarala Yeolekar as Sharda – Shamsher’s sister, Pasha's wife
- Geeta Siddharth as Kanta – Shamsher’s wife
- Jankidas as Shop owner Jankidas
- Harbans Darshan M. Arora as Jeweller Kirodimal
- Seema Deo as Renu's mother
- Rubina as Asha – Suraj’s sisree
- Tej Sapru as Vikram – Pasha's henchman
- Sharat Saxena as Rajpal

== Music and soundtrack ==
The music was composed by Bappi Lahiri and the lyrics of the songs were penned by Anjaan.

The film’s hit song "Chori Chori Yun Jab Ho" was inspired by The Bangles' song "Walk Like An Egyptian".

Song	Singer
"Chori Chori Yun Jab Ho"	Kishore Kumar
"Main Tera Tota, Tu Meri Maina, Mane Na Kyun Kehna"	Kishore Kumar, S. Janaki
"Bandhan Toote Na Sari Zindagi" (Part 1)	Lata Mangeshkar, Shabbir Kumar
"Bandhan Toote Na Sari Zindagi" (Part 2)	Lata Mangeshkar, Shabbir Kumar
"Ganga Ko Dekha, Jamna Ko Dekha, Dekha Samundar Pani"	Asha Bhosle, Shabbir Kumar
"Zindagi Pyar Hai, Pyar Hai Zindagi, Apni Sanson Mein Isko Basa Lo"	Asha Bhosle, Shabbir Kumar, Shailendra Singh
