= Kasak (1992 film) =

1990 film by K. Bapaiah

- Theatrical Release poster
- Directed by: K. Bapaiah
- Written by: Mani Ratnam
- Based on: Mouna Ragam by Mani Ratnam
- Starring: Rishi Kapoor; Neelam; Chunky Pandey
- Music by: Rajesh Roshan
- Release date: 1992
- Country: India
- Language: Hindi

Kasak is a 1992 Indian Hindi-language film directed by K. Bapaiah, starring Neelam, Rishi Kapoor and Chunky Pandey in the lead roles. It is the remake of Mani Ratnam's Tamil-language film Mouna Ragam.

== Plot ==
Divya is a free-spirited college student, who has lost her love for life after her lover Suraj dies. Her father has planned an arranged marriage for her and tells Divya to come home early from college to meet Vijay, the prospective groom. Uninterested in marriage, she deliberately arrives home late, hoping Vijay would have left, but finds him still patiently waiting. She gives various reasons to make him dislike her but, undeterred, he says that he likes her and agrees to the wedding. Divya initially refuses, but when her father has a heart attack, her mother begs her to accept the proposal to aid his recovery. Divya reluctantly marries Vijay, but he sees how unwilling she is, and they do not consummate their marriage.

Vijay takes Divya to his home but finds that she cannot accept him as her husband. When he asks her what she would like as a wedding gift, she says she wants a divorce, which shocks him. Some time later, Vijay about when she was in love with Suraj, during her college days: Divya had Suraj arrested after witnessing him robbing a politician's son. She later learns that the politician's son had run over a girl with his car, and Suraj robbed him to pay for the girl's medical treatment. Feeling guilty, she bails him out.

When Suraj meets Divya again, he falls in love with her; although she initially rejects him, she eventually returns his feelings. Suraj is part of a revolutionary group that plans to hold an illegal rally. Divya disapproves, and asks him not to attend; he agrees on the condition that she marry him. On their wedding day, Suraj is falsely accused of participating in the rally and arrested. He escapes and runs to the marriage registrar's office where Divya is waiting for him. A policeman accidentally shoots him, and he dies in front of Divya.

After hearing her story, Vijay tells Divya that he does not care about her past, but the future that he wants to build with her. He tells her to either sign the divorce papers he has obtained, or accept the anklets he bought as his wedding gift to her; Divya chooses divorce. They consult a lawyer who tells them that, per law they must wait one year to file for divorce since they are newly married. The couple is forced to live together for a year.

Having told Vijay about her past and the reason she was unable to accept her marriage, Divya finds herself free from her mental baggage and discomfort around Vijay. She begins to appreciate her situation and make the most of it. Conversely, Vijay is wary of her presence in his life as he fears what would happen once their divorce is approved. Troubled, he distances himself from her and rejects her every move. At the same time, he slowly begins falling in love with her while denying his feelings to himself.

One day, Vijay is attacked by his company's labourers because he had suspended their union leader, and Divya rushes him to a nearby hospital. After he is discharged, Divya takes care of him and realises that she has fallen in love with him. She tries to show it by wearing the anklets he bought for her. But before he can notice the anklets, they enter an argument as Divya tried to surprise him. He asks her to return to her family home and books her trip. Some time later, Vijay notices the anklets and realises that Divya does love him, but the next morning, both continue remaining distant.

Once Vijay leaves for work, Divya arrives alone at the railway station, where she sees him waiting for her. He hands her the divorce papers, saying they were approved that morning. Divya breaks down, telling Vijay that she loves him and would wait indefinitely for him to reciprocate. She tears the divorce papers and leaves to catch her train. Vijay, surprised at Divya's open declaration, catches the departing train, stops it and carries Divya home.

== Cast ==
- Neelam as Divya
- Rishi Kapoor as Vijay
- Chunky Pandey as Suraj
- Aruna Irani as Lajwanti
- Kader Khan as Hasmukh Sharma
- Asrani as
- Laxmikant Berde as Shayar
- Satyen Kappu as Divya's Father
- Gita Siddharth as Divya's Mother
- Jack Gaud as Inspector

== Music ==
The soundtrack of the film was composed by Rajesh Roshan.

1. "Mili Tere Pyaar Ki Chhaanv Re" – Anuradha Paudwal, Kumar Sanu
2. "Ek Taj Mahal Dil Mein" – Anwar
3. "Barsa Paani Barsa" – Sadhana Sargam
4. "Dekha Jo Husn Aapka" – Mohammed Aziz, Sadhana Sargam
5. "Ek Baar Pyaar Ka" (Duet) – Amit Kumar, Anuradha Paudwal
6. "Ek Baar Pyaar Ka" (Female) – Anuradha Paudwal
7. "Ek Baar Pyaar Ka" (Male) – Amit Kumar
