= Aag Ka Gola =

1989 film by David Dhawan

- Theatrical release poster
- Directed by: David Dhawan
- Screenplay by: Ram Kelkar
- Dialogues by: Faiz Salim
- Story by: Ram Kelkar
- Produced by: Pahlaj Nihalani
- Starring: Sunny Deol; Dimple Kapadia; Prem Chopra; Shakti Kapoor; Archana Puran Singh
- Cinematography: Siba Mishra
- Edited by: David Dhawan
- Music by: Bappi Lahiri
- Production company: Vishaldeep International Combine
- Distributed by: B4U Entertainment
- Release date: 29 December 1989
- Country: India
- Language: Hindi

Aag Ka Gola (English translation "Fire Ball") is a 1989 Indian Hindi-language action film directed by David Dhawan, starring Sunny Deol, Dimple Kapadia, Prem Chopra and Shakti Kapoor.

== Plot ==
Young Shankar is framed for a crime he did not commit. He escapes from the police and runs into his mother's arms. When Shankar's mother sees Shankar being arrested by police, she dies of shock. Shankar escapes from the police and ends up working for criminal Don Raja Babu. He is now known as "Shaka." One day, Raja Babu asks Shaka to abduct a child. The child's mother dies due to shock. This reminds Shaka (Shankar) of his mother dying due to shock. He repents, surrenders to the police, and is sent to jail for five years. His three-year punishment is condoned when he saves the life of a visiting parliamentarian. After being released from jail, he decides to live the life of an ordinary civilian and works as a garage mechanic. He meets Aarti, falls in love, and they marry. But Shankar's past starts haunting him to such an extent that he sees no choice but to join Raja Babu's crime gang.

== Cast ==
- Sunny Deol in a dual role as
  - Shankar Singh 'Shaka'
  - Vikram Singh – Shankar and Aarti's son
- Dimple Kapadia as Aarti Singh – Shankar's girlfriend, later wife
- Prem Chopra as Raja
- Shakti Kapoor as Inspector Popat Lal
- Archana Puran Singh as Nisha
- Raza Murad as Daaga
- Anjana Mumtaz as Sharda, Shankar's mother
- Pinchoo Kapoor as Aarti uncle
- Om Shivpuri as Marwani businessman Ajit
- Yunus Parvez as Rehmat Miya – Garage owner
- Paintal as Pritam, Shankar's friend
- Rajesh Puri as Bajrang – mechanic
- Mahesh Anand as Mahesh
- Sharat Saxena as Natwar dada
- Bob Christo as Goonga
- Chunky Pandey as himself

== Music and soundtrack ==
The music was composed by Bappi Lahiri and the lyrics of the songs were penned by Anjaan. The song "Aaya Aaya, Woh Aaya, Yaar Mera Aaya Re" became quite popular at the time of the release of the film.

#	Song	Singer
1	"Aaya Aaya, Woh Aaya, Yaar Mera Aaya Re"	Bappi Lahiri and Alka Yagnik
2	"Sharab Cheez Hai Buri"	S. Janaki
3	"Aag Ka Gola"	Shabbir Kumar
4	"Tauba Re Tauba"	Amit Kumar
5	"Aa Aa, Aa Bhi Jao Na, Na Na, Yun Satao Na"	Mohammed Aziz and Asha Bhosle
