= Griha Laxmi =

- Promotional poster
- Genre: Crime drama thriller
- Written by: Umang Beena Saxena; Ajaydeep Singh
- Directed by: Rumaan Kidwai
- Creative director: Arpita Das
- Starring: Hina Khan; Chunky Pandey; Dibyendu Bhattacharya; Rahul Dev; Manish Raisinghan; Harish Kumar; Abhishek Verma
- Country of origin: India
- Original language: Hindi
- No. of seasons: 1
- No. of episodes: 7

Production
- Producer: Kaushik Izardar
- Production locations: Betalgadh, Uttarakhand (fictional setting)
- Production companies: Kaans Production and Entertainment Studio

Original release
- Network: EPIC ON
- Release: 16 January 2025

Griha Laxmi is a 2025 Indian crime drama thriller web series that premiered on the streaming platform EPIC ON. The series stars Hina Khan as Laxmi, a housewife who becomes involved in the marijuana trade, with Chunky Pandey portraying the main antagonist. Dibyendu Bhattacharya and Rahul Dev appear in supporting roles. The series is directed by Rumaan Kidwai in his directorial debut and written by Umang Beena Saxena and Ajaydeep Singh, with Kaushik Izardar serving as producer under the banner Kaans Production and Entertainment Studio. It is set in the fictional town of Betalgadh in Uttarakhand.

== Premise ==
Laxmi, a financially struggling housewife, discovers a stash of marijuana during a police chase. She begins selling it to earn money, which draws her into the local drug trade. Her activities bring her into conflict with established drug networks and attract the attention of a drug baron operating from abroad as well as a senior police officer investigating the illegal trade.

== Cast and characters ==
- Hina Khan as Laxmi
- Chunky Pandey as Kareem Kazi
- Dibyendu Bhattacharya as Vikram Kandpal
- Rahul Dev as IPS Balram Tokas
- Manish Raisinghan as Milan
- Harish Kumar as Surya
- Abhishek Verma as Hemant

== Release ==
The official trailer for Griha Laxmi was released in January 2025. The series premiered on EPIC ON on 16 January 2025.

== Reception ==
The series received mixed reviews from critics.

Abhishek Srivastava of Times of India rated 2.5/5, noting "‘Griha Laxmi’ is a missed opportunity, hindered by its lack of realism and depth. The transition of Laxmi from a maid to a drug seller feels poorly developed and overly convenient, leaving little room for genuine investment in her journey. The series struggles to make its events believable, which diminishes the impact of what could have been a compelling narrative." Shatakshi Ganguly of IWM Buzz stated "With its nuanced characters and tenacious narrative, Griha Laxmi is a standout crime thriller. Bold, emotional, and thought-provoking, it’s a story that lingers long after the credits roll."

Amit Bhatia of APB LIVE rated 3/5 and noted "Rumaan Kidwai's direction is good, he has extracted good work from the actors. He has done a good job in a low budget. He further said, Overall, watch this series once for Hina Khan."

== See also ==
- List of web series
