= Jaan Ki Baazi =

- Promotional Poster
- Directed by: Ajay Kashyap
- Written by: Ajay Kashyap, Anwar Khan (dialogues)
- Produced by: B. P. Verma
- Starring: Sanjay Dutt; Anita Raj; Anuradha Patel
- Cinematography: V. Durgaprasad
- Edited by: David Dhawan
- Music by: Anu Malik
- Production company: Veera Combines
- Release date: 25 October 1985
- Country: India
- Language: Hindi

Jaan Ki Baazi is a 1985 Indian Hindi-language action film directed by Ajay Kashyap, starring Sanjay Dutt, Anita Raj, Anuradha Patel and Gulshan Grover. It was remade in Telugu as Mr. Hero (1988) starring Dr. Rajasekhar.

== Plot summary ==
This story is about a woman named Geeta, who has sworn to avenge the death of her late father. While searching for her father's murderers, she befriends (and later marries) Inspector Amar. He eventually sacrifices his life in the line of duty. Following Amar's death, Geeta joins the police force and continues searching for the murderers of her father. During this process she meets an auto-driver named Laxman. He helps her and endangers himself to confront the people who murdered Geeta's father.

== Cast ==
- Sanjay Dutt as Inspector Amar / Laxman (Double Role)
- Anita Raj as Inspector Geeta
- Anuradha Patel as Sundari
- Gulshan Grover as Cheetah
- Goga Kapoor as Mahendra
- Dan Dhanoa as Sanga
- Manik Irani as Ranga
- Shafi Inamdar as Inspector Ranjeet Waghmare
- Swaroop Sampat as Renu Waghmare
- Rakesh Bedi as Havaldar Tendulkar
- Satyen Kappu as Geeta's Father
- Seema Deo as Amar's Mother
- Jagdish Raj as Police Commissioner
- Robin Bhatt as Press Reporter Sharma

== Soundtrack ==
Lyrics: Anjaan

Song	Singer
"Bambai Ne Paida Kiya"	Kishore Kumar
"Main To Tun Ho Gaya"	Amit Kumar, S. Janaki
"Aate Aate Teri Yaad Aa Gayi" (Happy)	Mohammed Aziz, S. Janaki
"Aate Aate Teri" (Sad)	S. Janaki
"Mujhko Khuda Mil Gaya"	Shabbir Kumar, Dilraj Kaur
