= Farz Ki Jung =

- Directed by: R.P. Swamy
- Written by: Amrit Aryan
- Produced by: Dalwinder Sohal
- Starring: Govinda; Shashi Kapoor; Amrish Puri; Neelam
- Music by: Bappi Lahiri
- Release date: 17 March 1989
- Running time: 2 hours 19 min
- Country: India
- Language: Hindi

Farz Ki Jung is a 1989 Indian Bollywood action film directed by R.P. Swamy and produced by Dalwinder Sohal. It stars Govinda, Shashi Kapoor, Amrish Puri and Neelam in pivotal roles.

== Plot ==
Honest, hardworking, and diligent Police Inspector Vikram is ironically arrested for possession of drugs. The shock of the accusation causes his mother to die suddenly. Vikram is then tried in court, convicted, and sentenced to several years in prison.During his time in prison, he acquires the knowledge and skills that transform him into a career criminal, coming to believe that honesty offers no reward. Unaware of the consequences, this path ultimately sets him in conflict with his own brother, Inspector Amar, who has inherited Vikram’s original honesty and dedication.

== Cast ==
- Shashi Kapoor as Inspector Vikram
- Govinda as Vishal
- Neelam as Kavita
- Dalwinder Sohal as Inspector Amar
- Raza Murad as Inspector Gill
- Amrish Puri as Jai Kishan "J. K."
- Gita Siddharth as Laxmi (Jai Kishan's Wife)
- Iftekhar as Police Commissioner Walia
- Anjana Mumtaz as Jyoti (Vikram's Wife)
- Ashalata Wabgaonkar as Vikram's Mother
- Padma Khanna as Mrs. Suvarna Gill
- Yunus Parvez as Mr. Pandey, Vegetable vendor
- Mac Mohan as Janga
- Bob Christo as Mr. Barker
- Satyen Kappu as Ramdin
- Pinchoo Kapoor as CBI Officer Kulkarni
- Bhagwan as Police Constable Pandu
- Birbal as Man who gives complaint to Police Constable Pandu

== Music ==
Song	Singer
"Aap Ka Jawab Kya"	Mohammed Rafi
"Aap Se Mile"	Asha Bhosle
"Abhi Abhi"	Asha Bhosle
"O Saathiya, Ab Dar Kya, Pyar Kiya To Pyar Kiya"	Shabbir Kumar, Chandrani Mukherjee
"We Are The New Generation"	Vijay Benedict, Alisha Chinoy
