= Hum Bhi Insaan Hain (1989 film) =

- Film poster
- Directed by: Manivannan
- Screenplay by: Vinod Rattan; Anirudh Tiwari
- Story by: P. Kalaimani
- Based on: Muthal Vasantham (1986)
- Produced by: Suresh Bokadia
- Starring: Sanjay Dutt; Jackie Shroff; Raj Babbar; Jaya Prada; Neelam; Sonam
- Cinematography: A. Sabapathi
- Edited by: P. Venkateswara Rao
- Music by: Bappi Lahiri
- Production company: BMB Combines
- Release date: 23 June 1989
- Country: India
- Language: Hindi

Hum Bhi Insaan Hain (transl. We are humans too) is a 1989 Indian Hindi-language masala film directed by Manivannan and produced by Suresh Bokadia. It stars Sanjay Dutt, Jackie Shroff, Raj Babbar, Jaya Prada, Neelam and Sonam. It was given a superhit verdict at the box office. The film was a remake of the director's own Tamil film Muthal Vasantham.

== Plot ==
Dharampal presides over his palatial home and his family with dictatorial ruthlessness. His wife is terrified of him. His older daughter Radha would rather die than marry without his permission. Naturally, when his younger daughter, Rekha falls in love with a mere labourer, Bhola, this angers Dharampal to such an extent that he implicates Bhola for raping and abducting her, and forces her to testify against Bhola in court, and she does so. When Shankar and his wife attempt to help Bhola and Rekha, Dharampal has his men chop off both of Shankar's arms. The only one who could stand up to Dharampal is Kishanlal, his daughter's former lover, but how long will Dharampal tolerate him?

== Cast ==
- Sanjay Dutt... Bhola
- Jackie Shroff... Kishanlal
- Jaya Prada... Radha
- Neelam... Rekha
- Raj Babbar... Shankar
- Sonam... Shankar's wife
- Kader Khan... Dharampal
- Asrani... Munimji

== Production ==
Sathyaraj had been offered to reprise his role from the Tamil original but declined, so Sanjay Dutt was cast.

== Soundtrack ==
The music was composed by Bappi Lahiri.

Title	Singer(s)
"Yaar Tera Pyar Hai Meri"	Lata Mangeshkar, Mohammed Aziz
"Sun Le O Data"	Udit Narayan, Anuradha Paudwal
"Jab Ladka Sharmayega"	Shabbir Kumar, Kavita Krishnamurthy
"Baadal Hain Barsaate Hain"	Amit Kumar, Alisha Chinai
"Yaar Tera Pyar Hai Meri (sad)"	Lata Mangeshkar
