= Taaqatwar =

- CD soundtrack
- Directed by: David Dhawan
- Written by: David Dhawan; Anwar Khan
- Produced by: Bholi Jagdish Raaj; Bobby Raj; Manu Talreja
- Starring: Sanjay Dutt; Govinda; Anita Raj; Neelam
- Cinematography: Shyam Rao Shiposkar
- Edited by: David Dhawan
- Music by: Anu Malik
- Distributed by: Raaj N Raaj International; Ultra Pictures
- Release date: 16 June 1989
- Country: India
- Language: Hindi

Taaqatwar (transl.: Powerful) is a 1989 Indian Hindi-language action film directed by David Dhawan (in his directorial debut) and starring Sanjay Dutt, Govinda, Neelam Kothari and Anita Raj. Govinda worked with David Dhawan for the first time in Taaqatwar. He then formed a successful collaboration with David Dhawan and went on to act in 17 films directed by him.

== Cast ==
- Sanjay Dutt as Police Inspector Amar Sharma
- Govinda as John D'Mello
- Anita Raj as Anju Khurana
- Neelam Kothari as John D' Mello's girlfriend
- Paresh Rawal as Ganguram Tulsiram
- Tanuja as Mrs. Sharma
- Anil Dhawan as Master Peter D'Mello
- Anupam Kher as Municipal Officer Vijay Sharma
- Gulshan Grover as Khurana's son
- Shakti Kapoor as Munjal Khurana
- Vikas Anand as Lawyer Mohanlal Srivastav
- Bhagwan as A Guest In Wedding (Cameo Role)
- Gurbachan Singh as Sujit, Munjal Khurana Henchman

== Soundtrack ==
| Song | Singer |
|---|---|
| "John D'Mello" | Kishore Kumar |
| "Chadh Gayi Chadh Gayi" | Amit Kumar; Alisha Chinai |
| "Aaiye Aap Ka Intezar Tha" | Anu Malik; Alisha Chinai |
| "Choron Ki Toli Leke" | Shabbir Kumar; Amit Kumar; Anupama Deshpande; Chandrani Mukherjee |
| "Dhak Dhak Karti Hai" | Anuradha Paudwal |
