= Khule-Aam =

- Theatrical release poster
- Directed by: Tarun Dutt; Arun Dutt
- Written by: Arun Dutt
- Starring: Shammi Kapoor; Dharmendra; Moushumi Chatterjee; Chunky Pandey; Neelam
- Music by: R. D. Burman
- Release date: 25 December 1992
- Running time: 2 hour 35 minutes
- Country: India
- Language: Hindi

Khule-Aam is a 1992 Indian Hindi-language film starring Shammi Kapoor, Dharmendra, Moushumi Chatterjee, Chunky Pandey, Neelam. The film was the last directorial venture of Guru Dutt's eldest son Tarun Dutt who committed suicide during production. The film was completed by his younger brother, Arun Dutt, who also wrote the script.

== Plot ==
Khule-Aam is the story of a number of characters who keep facing problems in their lives. An honest farmer Shiva pays the price for his honesty when his wife Roopa is killed. Inspector Rathod who is forced to get his hands dirty to find his father's true killer. Sikandar, an innocent truck driver gets accused of a murder he did not commit.

== Cast ==
- Shammi Kapoor as Sikandar / Bhola
- Dharmendra as Shiva
- Moushumi Chatterjee as Roopa
- Chunky Pandey as Surya
- Neelam as Priya
- Danny Denzongpa as Inspector Uday Singh Rathod / Inspector Ranveer Singh Rathod (Double Role)
- Sadashiv Amrapurkar as Champaklal
- Iftekhar as Colonel Pratap Singh Rana
- Jagdish Raj as Inspector Nath
- Viju Khote as Inspector Damodar

== Soundtrack ==
The music was composed by R. D. Burman and the lyrics were penned by Indeevar.

Songs
| No. | Title | Playback | Length |
|---|---|---|---|
| 1. | "Kaam Kisi Ke Koi Aye Na" | Asha Bhosle, Gautam Roy | 5:38 |
| 2. | "Mohabbat Karo Khule Aam Karo" | Mohammed Aziz | 5:22 |
| 3. | "Parbat Se Neeche Gira Du" | Asha Bhosle, Gautam Roy | 5:56 |
| 4. | "Tujhko Maine Dil Diya Tujhse Maine Pyar Kiya" | Sadhana Sargam, Gautam Roy | 5:24 |
| 5. | "Pehle Peher Deedar Hua" | Asha Bhosle, Gautam Roy | 6:47 |
