= Ajay Kashyap =

Indian Bollywood film director

Ajay Kashyap is an Indian Bollywood film director. His directorial debut was Jaan Ki Baazi (1985). He followed it by directing Mera Haque (1986), Naam O Nishan (1987), Do Qaidi (1989) among others. Six of his films had Sanjay Dutt in starring roles. His last direction venture was The Coal Mafia (2012).

== Filmography ==
- Jaan Ki Baazi (1985)
- Mera Haque (1986)
- Naam O Nishan (1987)
- Do Qaidi (1989)
- Maa (1991)
- Pathreela Raasta (1994)
- The Coal Mafia (2012)
