= Billoo Badshah =

- Directed by: Sisir Misra
- Produced by: Suresh S
- Starring: Govinda; Neelam; Anita Raj; Kader Khan; Shatrughan Sinha
- Music by: Jagjit Singh
- Release date: 28 April 1989
- Running time: 2 hours 28 min
- Country: India
- Language: Hindi

Billoo Badshah is a 1989 Indian drama film directed by Sisir Mishra. It stars Govinda, Shatrughan Sinha, Neelam and Anita Raj. It was produced by Shatrughan Sinha's elder brother Lakhan Sinha.

== Plot ==
Billu, an orphan, makes sacrifices for the family who helped him when he was alone. Things change when the same family humiliates Billu.

== Cast ==
- Shatrughan Sinha as Billu
- Govinda as Vijay
- Neelam as Jyoti
- Anita Raj as Asha
- Sumeet Saigal as Ravi
- Archana Joglekar as Nisha
- Rohini Hattangadi as Billoo's mother
- Sudhir Dalvi as Shankarlal, Billoo's father
- Ashalata Wabgaonkar as Sumitra, Vijay's mother
- Harish Patel as Tikdamdas
- Kader Khan as Than-Than Tiwari
- Gulshan Grover as Munna Tiwari
- Goga Kapoor as Ramchabile Tiwari
- Mac Mohan as Abdul
- Yunus Parvez as Rickshaw Owner
- Shubha Khote as Sheela
- Ramna Wadhawan as Ganga Devi

== Music ==
1. "Jawan Jawan Ishq Jawan Hai" – Govinda
2. "Pyar Karenge Abhi Karenge" – Kumar Sanu, Kavita Krishnamurthy
3. "Ladka Razi Ladki Razi" – Kumar Sanu
4. "Yeh Jo Ghar Aangan Hai" – Vinod Sehgal, Dilraj Kaur
5. "Yeh Jo Ghar Aangan Hai (sad)" – Jagjit Singh
