= Do Qaidi =

- Directed by: Ajay Kashyap
- Written by: Bhushan Banmali; Pushpa S. Choudhary
- Produced by: Pushpa S. Choudhary
- Starring: Sanjay Dutt; Govinda; Farah; Neelam Kothari; Amrish Puri; Gulshan Grover; Ranjeeta Kaur
- Cinematography: K.V. Ramanna
- Edited by: Kamal Saigal
- Music by: Laxmikant–Pyarelal
- Distributed by: Heera International
- Release date: 24 February 1989
- Running time: 158 minutes
- Country: India
- Language: Hindi

Do Qaidi (transl. Two Prisoners) is a 1989 Indian Hindi-language action thriller film directed by Ajay Kashyap starring Sanjay Dutt, Govinda, Farah and Neelam Kothari in lead roles.

== Plot ==
Manu and Kanu are two thieves. They work for criminal K.K. But, Bichoo who is K.K.'s son, dislikes them because of past disputes. Bichoo out of enmity gets them arrested. However they escape while going to court. It is then revealed that they are responsible for killing a Police Inspector named Amar Sinha, and that the police have issued shoot-at-sight orders for both of them. The question remains, why would two small thieves kill a Police Officer. Is this a conspiracy against them or truth.

== Cast ==
- Sanjay Dutt as Manu
- Govinda as Kanu
- Farah as Meenu (Neelu's Sister)
- Neelam Kothari as Neelu (Meenu's Sister)
- Amrish Puri as K.K.
- Gulshan Grover as Bichoo
- Ranjeeta Kaur as Mrs. Amar Sinha
- Suresh Oberoi as Inspector Amar Sinha
- Jalal Agha
- Vikas Anand as Inspector Naik
- Bharat Bhushan
- Birbal
- Baby Guddu as Baby Rani
- Kamal Kapoor as Police Commissioner
- Shubha Khote as Woman with necklace
- Guddi Maruti
- Ghanshyam Rohera as Havaldar Syed Ali
- Gita Siddharth

== Tracks ==
1. Allah Allah Yeh Kaisa Gazab [05:30]: Shabbir Kumar, Kavita Krishnamurthy
2. Aa Rab Se Dua Mange [05:52]: Mohammad Aziz, Suresh Wadkar, Anuradha Paudwal, Kavita Krishnamurthy
3. Hanste Jana Tum [04:04]: Kishore Kumar
4. Hum Rahen Na Rahen [02:00]: Sadhana Sargam, Sonali Vajpayee
5. Parody Song (Do Qaidi) [07:10]: Amit Kumar, Mohammad Aziz, Laxmikant–Pyarelal
6. Yeh Chali Woh Chali [06:24]: Laxmikant–Pyarelal, Kavita Krishnamurthy
