= Ghar Ka Chiraag =

- Poster
- Directed by: Sikander Bharti
- Produced by: Rajeev Kumar
- Starring: Rajesh Khanna; Chunky Panday; Neelam
- Music by: Bappi Lahiri
- Release date: 22 December 1989
- Country: India
- Language: Hindi

Ghar Ka Chiraag (transl. Only Son) is a 1989 Indian film in Hindi directed by Sikander Bharti. The film stars Rajesh Khanna, Chunky Panday, Neelam in the lead roles. Actor Chunky Panday himself distributed this film.

== Cast ==
- Rajesh Khanna as Kumar
- Chunky Panday as Ravi
- Neelam as Kiran
- Deepika Chikhalia as Asha
- Om Shivpuri as College Principal Ranjeet
- Shafi Inamdar as Ravi's father
- Tej Sapru as Pratap
- Arun Bakshi as Murli Kaka
- Gurbachan Singh as Jaggu
- Rajan Haksar as Vijay Singh

== Plot ==
Kumar is a wealthy businessman and lives a comfortable lifestyle with his lovely wife, Asha, in a palatial house. The only thing missing from their lives is a son. When Asha gets pregnant, Kumar knows that all his dreams will be fulfilled and his business will be known as "Kumar & Son". Unfortunately, Asha has a miscarriage which results in her and her son's deaths. A devastated Kumar takes to alcohol and devotes his energy and finances to a school for needy children in scenic Mussoorie. It is here he meets the College Principal's daughter, Kiran, who he knows is in love with a fellow collegian, Ravi. When Ravi participates in the annual car rally, his vehicle is sabotaged and he is reportedly killed. But the college principal discovers that his daughter is pregnant with Ravi's child and when Kumar learns of this, he agrees to lend his own name to the unborn child. Kiran marries Kumar and they lead a happy married life, though Kumar never had physical relation with Kiran. A son is born and Kumar rears the child as his own, completely ignoring his duties towards his wife. Meanwhile, Ravi survives and with the help of his parents wants to return to Mussoorie. Before that could happen, Kiran's father tells them that Kiran is no more, throwing Ravi into a relapse. Months later Ravi does recover, but refuses to get married. Then five years later he finds out that there will be another car rally there and despite his parents' objections, he travels to Mussoorie and this is where he learns that Kiran is still alive and even has a son, and her husband is none other than the wealthy widower - Kumar. Ravi must now find out why Kiran's father lied to him, and whether or not Kiran wanted to marry Kumar because of his wealth. Kumar's life drastically changes once Ravi re-enters their lives.

== Soundtrack ==
Lyrics by Anjaan.

Song	Singer
"Tutak Tutak Tutiyan"	Asha Bhosle
"Tutak Tutak Tutiyan"	Amit Kumar
"Yeh Kismat Hai Kya" (Happy)	Amit Kumar, Mohammed Aziz, Sapna Mukherjee
"Yeh Kismat Hai Kya"	Mohammed Aziz
"Papa Mere Papa"	Mohammed Aziz, Sarika Kapoor, Kumar Sanu
"Ae Kash Tum Kehdo Kabhi"	Udit Narayan, Sapna Mukherjee
"Ae Kash Tum Kehdo Kabhi" (Sad)	Udit Narayan, Sapna Mukherjee
"Dil Lene Aaya Hoon"	Shabbir Kumar, Alisha Chinai
