= Mitti Aur Sona =

- Directed by: Shiv Kumar
- Written by: Mulraj Rajda; Debu Sen
- Produced by: Pahlaj Nihalani
- Starring: Chunky Panday; Sonam; Neelam
- Music by: Bappi Lahiri
- Release date: 28 July 1989
- Country: India
- Language: Hindi

Mitti Aur Sona (transl. Clay and Gold) is a 1989 Indian Bollywood action film directed by Shiv Kumar and produced by Pahlaj Nihalani. The film stars Chunky Panday, Sonam, and Neelam in lead roles.

== Plot ==
Vijay (Chunky Panday) is a college student from a wealthy family. Anupama (Neelam) is his best friend and the parents of both expect them to get married. But when Vijay meets Neelima (Sonam), he falls in love with her. But his parents are against the match as Neelima is an orphan who is poor and also of questionable character. Vijay leaves home to work as a truck driver for the sake of being with Neelima.

== Cast ==
- Chunky Panday as Vijay Bhushan
- Sonam as Anupama / Neelima
- Neelam as Asha / Anupama
- Vinod Mehra as Inspector Sunil
- Pran as Advocate Yashwant Sinha
- Prem Chopra as Chinoy
- Gulshan Grover as J.C.
- Om Shivpuri as Brij Bhushan
- Aruna Irani as Kitty

== Soundtrack ==
Song	Singer
"One Two Three"	Amit Kumar, Asha Bhosle
"Mitti Ban Jaye"	Amit Kumar, Asha Bhosle
"Mara Jisko"	Shabbir Kumar, Asha Bhosle
"Pyar Kiya Hai"	Lata Mangeshkar, Shabbir Kumar
"Tum Bewafa Ho"	Shabbir Kumar
