= Gharana (1989 film) =

- Directed by: K. Ravi Shankar
- Written by: Abrar Alvi; Gyandev Agnihotri
- Produced by: K. Ravi Shankar; A. Krishnamoorthi (presenter)
- Starring: Rishi Kapoor; Govinda; Jaya Prada; Meenakshi Seshadri; Neelam Kothari
- Cinematography: K. V. Ramanna
- Edited by: Waman Bhonsle; Gurudutt Shirali
- Music by: Laxmikant–Pyarelal
- Production company: Tina Films International
- Release date: 1 January 1989
- Country: India
- Language: Hindi

Gharana is a 1989 Indian Hindi-language film produced and directed by K. Ravi Shankar. It stars Rishi Kapoor, Govinda, Jaya Prada, Meenakshi Seshadri and Neelam Kothari in pivotal roles.

== Cast ==
- Rishi Kapoor as Vijay Mehra
- Govinda as Ravi Mehra
- Jaya Prada as Naina
- Meenakshi Seshadri as Radha
- Neelam as Lalita
- Tanuja as Laxmi Mehra
- Shreeram Lagoo as Prem Mehra
- Satyendra Kapoor as Rahim
- Shakti Kapoor as Durlabh
- Prem Chopra as Dharamdas
- Asrani as Natwar
- Aruna Irani as Natwar's Assistant
- Sushma Seth as Shraddha
- Dara Singh as Vijay Singh Pahelwan
- Yunus Parvez as Sinha (potential in-laws of Mehras)
- Shekhar Suman as Ajit Sinha
- Bharat Bhushan as Radha's father
- Ramesh Deo as Munshi of Prem Mehra
- Bob Christo as Sheikh Diamond Merchant
- Mac Mohan as Durlabh Henchman

== Plot ==
Prem Mehra is a wealthy, kind-hearted, and generous man who lives in a palatial home with his wife, Laxmi, a daughter, and two sons, Vijay and Ravi. Dharamdas is a foe of Prem, and he involves gangster and an employee of Prem's (accountant) to steal some priceless diamonds from his safe, thereby implicating Prem in the theft, and making him lose all his wealth and estate. Prem and his family re-locate to live with their devoted and loyal employee, Rahim. Vijay gets a job as a news-reporter, while Ravi continues with his studies. Prem's daughter's marriage is on the rocks as he now cannot afford to pay the dowry sum of seven lakhs rupees. Prem has a stroke that leaves him paralysed. Radha is Vijay's co-worker, both fall in love and seek their respective families' blessings so that they can marry. But before they can get married, Vijay suddenly breaks all ties with Radha and instead marries Naina, the only daughter of Shraddha, his boss, thus making it clear to his family and Radha that he has married a girl for wealth. But actually Vijay marries Naina in exchange for 7 lakhs rupees which he uses to marry off his sister. Ravi too wants to marry Lalita - who is none other than Dharamdas' daughter. Ravi leaves his family and acts as a confidante of Dharamdas but eventually reveals that he was acting all along to help prove his father innocent. In the climax, the goon (Shakti Kapoor) kills Naina who, before her death, asks Radha and Vijay to get married. Ravi marries Lalita, Prem Mehra is proven innocent and the family is united again.

== Music ==
Lyrics by Anand Bakshi.

#	Title	Singer(s)
1.	"Dhak Dhak Dhak Dhak Aise Jiyara Kare"	Anuradha Paudwal, Mohammad Aziz
2.	"Khushi Ka Hai Mauka"	Anuradha Paudwal
3.	"Kiss And Tell Lala Lalala"	Amit Kumar, Alka Yagnik
4.	"Tere Daddy Ne Diya Mujhe Parmit Tujhe Patane Ka"	Amit Kumar, Alka Yagnik
5.	"Salamat Rahega Ye Ghar Ye Gharana"	Suresh Wadkar, Mohammad Aziz
