= Nandikatta =

- village
- Country: India
- State: Karnataka
- District: Uttara Kannada
- Talukas: Mundgod

Population (2001)
  - Total: 7,985

Languages
  - Official: Kannada
- Time zone: UTC+5:30 (IST)

Nandikatta is a village in the southern state of Karnataka, India. It is located in the Mundgod taluk of Uttara Kannada district. It and its neighboring towns harbor the Drepung Tibetan Buhdist Monastery.

== Demographics ==
As of 2001 India census, Nandikatta had a population of 7985 with 5640 males and 2345 females.

== See also ==
- Uttara Kannada
- Mangalore
- Districts of Karnataka
