= Neelam Kothari =

Indian actress (born 1969)

Neelam Kothari Soni
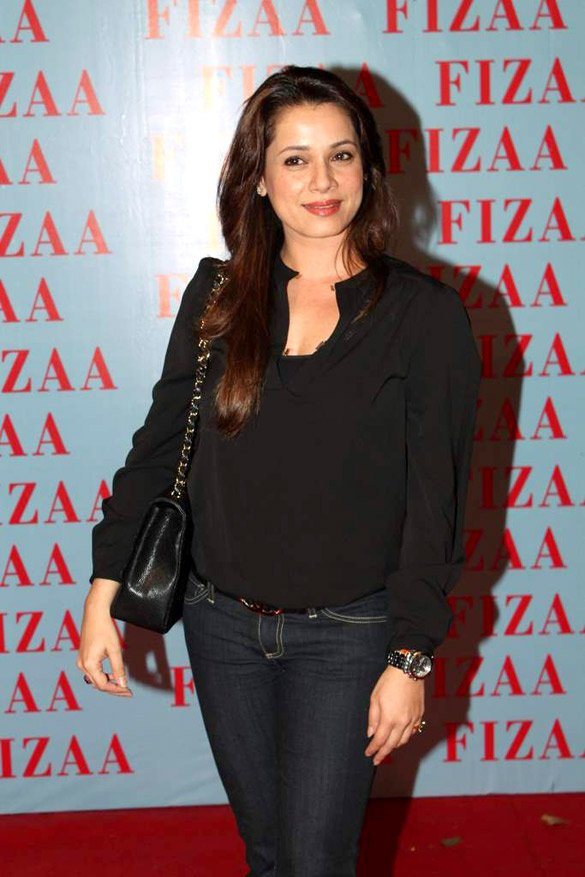
- Kothari Soni in 2012
- Born: Neelam Kothari; 9 November 1969 (age 57); British Hong Kong
- Citizenship: India
- Occupations: Actress, jewellery designer
- Years active: 1984–2001; 2020–present
- Spouses: Rishi Sethia (m. 2000; div. 2005) Samir Soni (m. 2011)
- Children: 1

Neelam Kothari Soni (née Kothari; born 9 November 1969), known mononymously as Neelam, is an Indian jewellery designer and actress who worked in Hindi films. Popular during the late 1980s, Neelam was known for her "girl-next-door" charm and her onscreen pairing with actor Govinda.

== Early life ==
Kothari was born in Hong Kong to a Gujarati Jain father Shishir Kothari and Parsi mother Parveen Kothari. As a child, she learned to play the keyboard and danced Jazz Ballet. Her family has a traditional jewellery-making business, making high-class pieces. She was educated at Island School, where she was a member of Rutherford House. When she was a teenager, her family moved to Bangkok. When Neelam was on vacation in Mumbai she was approached by director Ramesh Behl. She decided to give acting a shot and signed Jawaani (1984) alongside Karan Shah, Tina Munim's nephew.

== Career ==
=== Acting ===
Kothari made her acting debut with Jawaani (1984), followed it in various films opposite Govinda such as Love 86 (1986), Ilzaam (1986), Sindoor (1987), Khudgarz (1987), Hatya (1988), Farz Ki Jung (1989), Billoo Badshah (1989), Taaqatwar (1989) and Do Qaidi (1989); simultaneously starred opposite Chunky Pandey in films Aag Hi Aag (1987), Paap Ki Duniya (1988), Khatron Ke Khiladi (1988), Ghar Ka Chiraag (1989), and Mitti Aur Sona (1989).

Though Jawaani was not a big hit commercially, Neelam's performance in her debut film was noticed and she received many offers. She gained popularity from her role in Ilzaam (1986) opposite debutant Govinda. She made a very popular pairing with Govinda and they starred together in 14 movies. The bigger hits amongst them include Love 86 (1986), Khudgarz (1987), Hatya (1988) and Taaqatwar (1989). She gave five hits with Chunkey Pandey - Aag Hi Aag (1987), Paap Ki Duniya (1988), Khatron Ke Khiladi (1988), Mitti Aur Sona (1989) and Ghar Ka Chiraag (1989), out of the eight films she costarred with him (the other three were Zakham (1989 film), Khule-Aam and a Bengali film, Mandira). She has also worked in the Bengali film Badnam (1990) with Prosenjit Chatterjee.

Neelam has also appeared in the popular Kuch Kuch Hota Hai (1998) where she played herself as a VJ and the ensemble family drama Hum Saath Saath Hain (1999) in which she played a pivotal supporting role. Her last film was the much-delayed Kasam (2001) opposite Chunky Pandey.

In 2020-22 she has appeared alongside Maheep Kapoor, Bhavna Pandey and Seema Sajdeh in 3 seasons of the reality television series Fabulous Lives of Bollywood Wives that streamed on Netflix.

=== Jewellery designing ===
Even while pursuing her career in acting, she was interested in jewellery designing and was involved in her family business. She followed a formal course in jewellery-designing in Mumbai and, after quitting films temporarily in 2001, started out commercially on her own under the name Neelam Jewels. She opened a showroom in Mumbai in 2004. She then launched her jewellery store in Mumbai on 25 August 2011 under the name Neelam Kothari Fine Jewels.

=== Other works ===
Neelam featured in Bina Mistry's Hot Hot Hot music video, a song that is part of a compilation of dance hits in the 1995 BMG release, titled Channel [V] Hits: The Ultimate Dance Collection. The song became a hit when it was featured as part of the soundtrack of Bend It Like Beckham (2002). In 2022, she collaborated with the BNK Group to design luxury residential interiors.

== Personal life ==
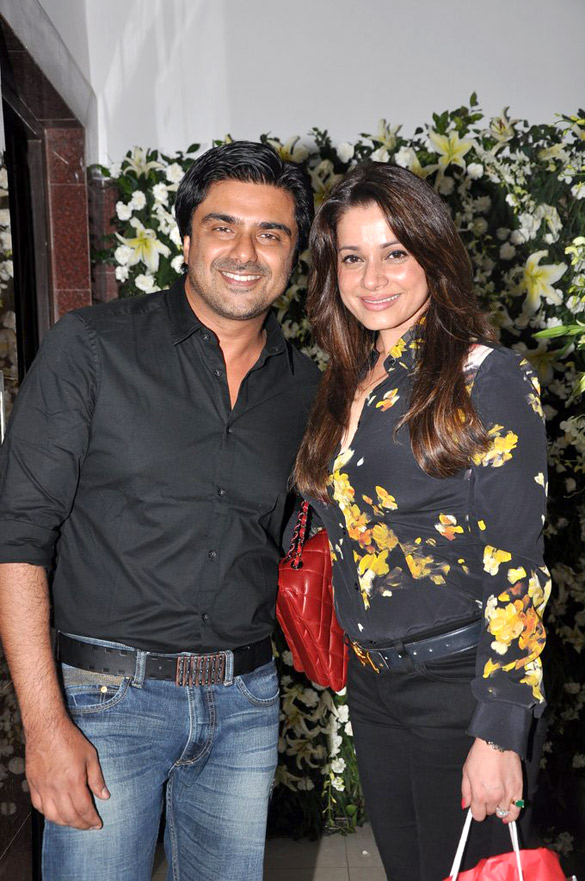
Neelam Kothari Soni with husband Samir Soni in 2012

In October 2000, Neelam married Rishi Sethia, the son of a businessman from the UK but they got divorced soon after. After a brief relationship with actor Samir Soni, she married him in 2011. In 2013, they adopted a daughter and named her Ahana.

== Blackbuck poaching case ==
In 1998, Neelam was charged with the Wildlife Act and the Indian Penal Code for the poaching of two blackbucks in Kankani during the filming of Hum Saath Saath Hain, along with co-stars Salman Khan, Saif Ali Khan, Sonali Bendre and Tabu. She was acquitted by the court of a chief judicial magistrate at Jodhpur on 5 April 2018.

== Filmography ==
Year	Title	Role	Notes
1984	Jawaani	Sanam	
1986	Ilzaam	Aarti	
1986	Andaz Pyar Ka		
1986	Love 86	Esha	
1987	Aag Hi Aag	Aarti	
1987	Khudgarz	Jyoti	
1987	Sindoor	Lalita Kapoor	
1988	Taaqatwar	Bijli	
1988	Hatya	Sapna	
1988	Ghar Mein Ram Gali Mein Shyam	Jaya	
1988	Khatron Ke Khiladi	Sunita	
1988	Paap Ki Duniya	Aarti	
1988	Waqt Ki Awaz	Uncredited	
1989	Gharana	Lalita	
1989	Do Qaidi	Neelu	
1989	Ghar Ka Chiraag	Kiran	
1989	Hum Bhi Insaan Hain	Rekha	
1989	Mitti Aur Sona	Anupama	
1990	Pyar Ka Karz	Seema Sanyal	
1990	Doodh Ka Karz	Reshma	
1990	Chor Pe Mor	Ritu	
1990	Amiri Garibi	Jyoti	
1990	Agneepath	Siksha Chavan	
1990	Zakham	Aarti	
1990	Billoo Badshah	Jyoti	
1990	Farz Ki Jung	Kavita	
1990	Dost Garibon Ka	Rekha	
1990	Upkar Dhoodhache	Reshma	Marathi
1990	Badnam	Priya Dutta	Bengali
1990	Mandira		Bengali
1991	Vishnu-Devaa	Paro	
1991	Shankara	Seema	
1991	Kasak	Divya	
1991	Ranbhoomi	Neelam	
1991	Indrajeet	Neelam	
1991	Afsana Pyaar Ka	Nikita	
1991	Pratigyabadh	Shobhna	
1992	Ek Ladka Ek Ladki	Renu / Rani	
1992	Khule-Aam	Priya	
1992	Sahebzaade	Chinar	
1992	Laat Saab	Anju / Mona	
1993	Parampara	Sapna	
1995	Santaan	Asha	
1995	Antim Nyay	Seema A. Verma	
1996	Ek Tha Raja	Shilpa	
1996	Sauda	Jyoti	
1996	Aadithya	Neelam	Regional
1996	Zordaar	Anju Sharma	
1997	Mohabbat Aur Jung	Priya	
1998	Kuch Kuch Hota Hai	VJ Neelam	Special appearance
1999	Hum Saath-Saath Hain: We Stand United	Sangeeta	
2001	Kasam	Bindiya	

=== Television ===
Year	Title	Role	Notes	Ref(s)
2020–present	Fabulous Lives of Bollywood Wives	Herself		
2022	Masaba Masaba	Herself		
2023	Made in Heaven	Kriti Malhotra		
2025	The Ba***ds of Bollywood	Herself	Cameo Appearance	
