= Chunky Panday =

Indian actor (born 1962)

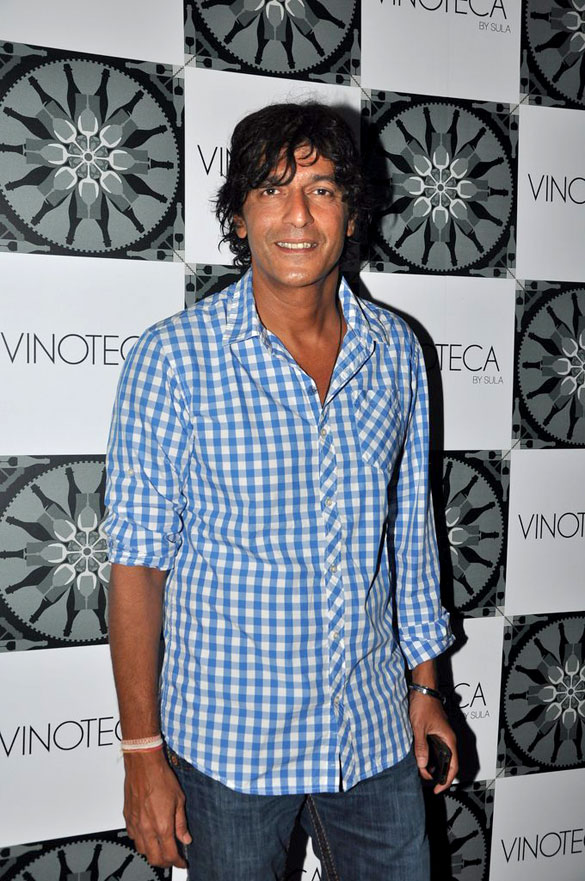
- Panday in 2012
- Born: Suyash Panday; 26 September 1962 (age 64); Bombay, Maharashtra, India
- Occupation: Actor
- Years active: 1987–present
- Spouse: Bhavana Panday (m. 1998)
- Children: 2; including Ananya
- Father: Sharad Panday
- Family: Panday family

Suyash "Chunky" Panday (born 26 September 1962) is an Indian actor who primarily appears in Hindi-language films. Throughout the late 1980s and 1990s, Panday played action-oriented roles in ensemble films before transitioning to comedy roles in the 2000s and beyond. He starred in the film Tezaab which earned him the nomination of Filmfare Award for Best Supporting Actor.

== Early life ==
Chunky Panday was born as Suyash Panday on 26 September 1962 in Bombay, to Sharad Panday (1934–2004), a heart surgeon known for the 'Panday shunt' workaround for mitral valve replacement, and Snehlata Panday (1936–2011), a physician. Sharad performed India's first heart transplant.

Snehlata was a gynaecologist who opened a beauty parlour and a clinic for slimming during the 1980s, one of the first of its kind in India, some of her celebrity patients including Bollywood stars Rekha and Vinod Khanna, also authoring books and articles on the subject of weight loss. Snehlata was of Punjabi descent. She was born Snehlata Kapoor in Rawalpindi (now Punjab, Pakistan) before partition. Lt. Col. Raj Kumar Kapoor, a retired Indian Army officer turned character actor, who had launched Shah Rukh Khan with the television series Fauji (1989), was his maternal uncle.

He has one younger brother Chikki Panday, a businessman married to wellness coach, Deanne Panday.

Before entering films, he was in the same acting school as Akshay Kumar, serving as his acting instructor.

== Career ==
=== 1987–1993: Debut and early success ===
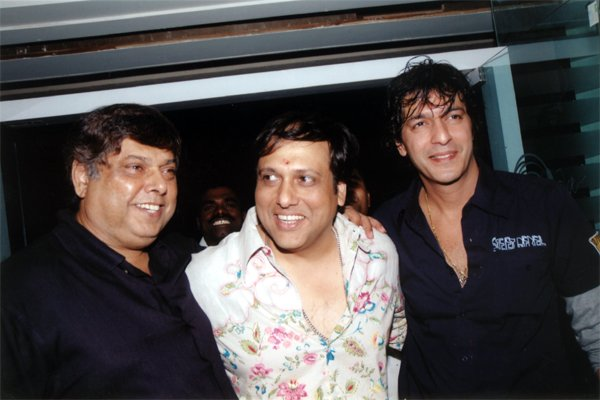
Panday with David Dhawan and Govinda

He made his acting debut in 1987 with the film Panday debuted his acting career with the 1987 multi-starer film Aag Hi Aag opposite Neelam Kothari and gained recognition for his supporting role as Babban in Tezaab (1988), which earned him a Filmfare nomination for Best Supporting Actor. Film producer Pahlaj Nihalani gave Panday his first break in 1987 by signing him up for two films, his debut film and Paap Ki Duniya. His second successful film was Paap Ki Duniya with Sunny Deol and Neelam Kothari. Subsequently, Panday appeared in many multi-hero films from 1987 to 1993. In 1988, Panday was appreciated for his supporting role in N. Chandra's film Tezaab featuring Anil Kapoor and Madhuri Dixit. Panday played the character of Babban, Munna's (Anil Kapoor) friend. For his performance in Tezaab, Panday was nominated for the Filmfare Award for Best Supporting Actor.

Since then he has appeared in many films with mixed success throughout the late 1980s and 1990s. Most of his films where he had the leading role did not fare well at the box office. In most films, he was cast in supporting roles to senior actors like Rajesh Khanna, Dharmendra, Jeetendra, Sunny Deol and Sanjay Dutt. Some of those hit films with him in second lead, are Paap Ki Duniya (1988), Khatron Ke Khiladi (1988), Ghar Ka Chiraag (1989), Nakabandi, Zahreelay (1990), Rupaye Dus Karod, Vishwatma (1992), Lootere (1993) and Aankhen (1993). His solo hit was Parda Hai Parda (1992).

=== 1994–2003: Career slump and hiatus ===
The advent of the 1990s saw a new wave of actors like Aamir Khan, Salman Khan and Shah Rukh Khan taking on roles as "romantic heroes", while Akshay Kumar, Suniel Shetty and Ajay Devgan grabbed the "action hero" roles, whereas Sunny Deol, Anil Kapoor, Jackie Shroff, Govinda continued as more versatile established actors. Panday found it difficult to slot himself in either category. In addition, by the late nineties, solo-hero films were back in vogue instead of the multi-hero films in which Panday was generally cast and Panday was not seen as a marketable hero for solo hero films.

Panday grew increasingly tired of playing second fiddle to more prominent actors, but had difficulty being seen as marketable, other than supporting household names. "I was offered hero ke bhai ka (lead actor's brother) roles," he said. "I (told them), 'Boss, not happening.'" Due to a lack of work in Bollywood, he moved to act as hero in Bangladesh films. In 1995, he was offered his first films as the lead hero in Bangladeshi films. He acted in six films between 1995 and 1997 as hero in Bangladesh and all of them were successful. Between 1997 and 2002, he received minimal work in Bollywood, playing supporting roles in low-budget films like Tirchhi Topiwale, Yeh Hai Mumbai Meri Jaan, Kaun Rokega Mujhe and Jwalamukhi.

=== 2003–present: Return to Bollywood ===
Panday returned to Bollywood in 2003 playing minor supporting roles in Qayamat: City Under Threat, Elaan, Don: The Chase Begins Again, Mumbai Se Aaya Mera Dost and Apna Sapna Money Money.

In 2005, he played an underworld gangster in the Ram Gopal Varma film D – Underworld Badshah. Later, director Ram Gopal Varma roped him in for Darwaaza Bandh Rakho, a dark comedy thriller in which he played one of four robbers who hold a family hostage.

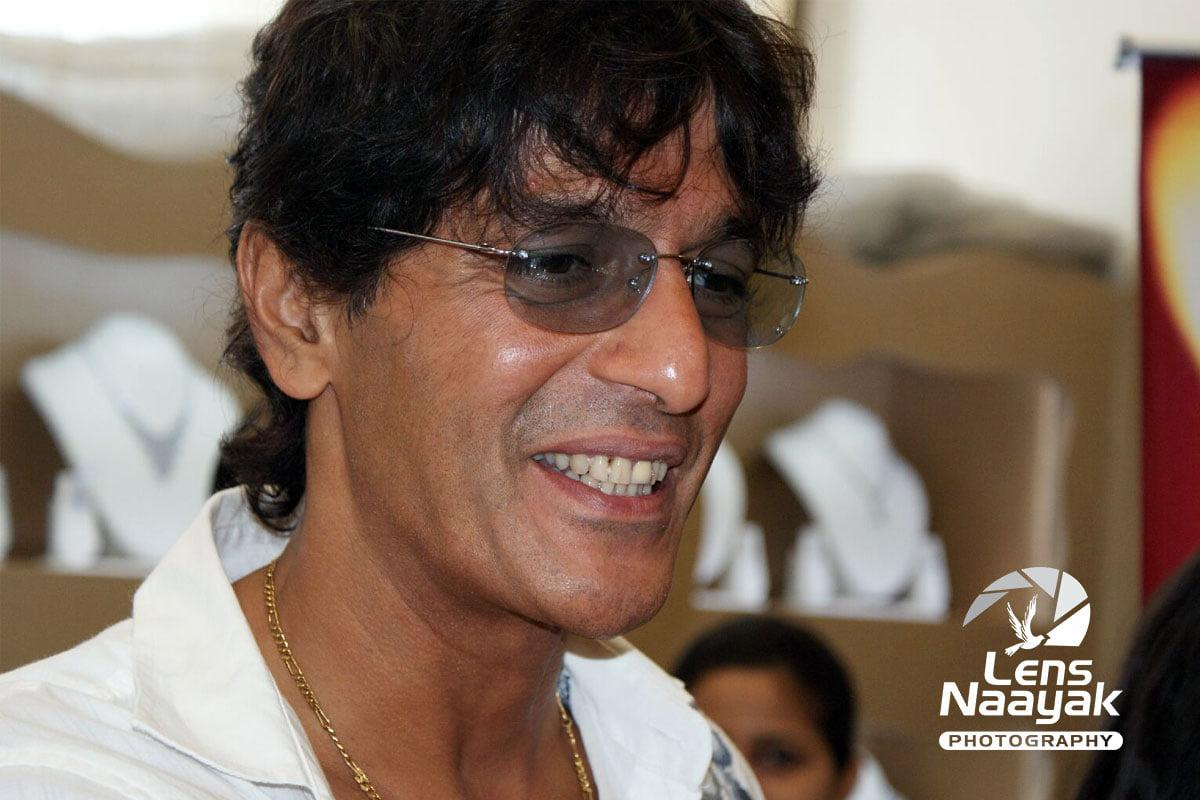
Chunky Panday (photographed)

Between the years of 2006 to 2010, Panday would star in small comedic roles, settling into a reputation of being comic relief. The role that earned him the most success was playing the character of Indo-Italian "Aakhri Pasta" in the 2010 comedy hit Housefull. His catchphrase from the movie that is often quoted is an accented "I'm-a joking!" His role was so memorable that he reprised the role in the sequels Housefull 2 in 2012, Housefull 3 in 2016, Housefull 4 in 2019 and Housefull 5 in 2025.

In regards to his film selection since returning to acting in Bollywood, Panday has stated that he prefers not to play a hero nowadays because there is less pressure on him if the film fails and it's much more fun playing interesting characters and showing his range.

While Panday's second stint in Bollywood has mainly consisted of starring as a character actor, he doesn't want to be pigeonholed into only doing comic roles. "I don't think I am restricting myself to doing only comedy. I am hoping that someone offers me something else. It requires a lot of guts for someone to cast me in something else. I am just hoping that someone sees something else in me other than comedy."

This hope was realised with Panday starring as villains in the films Begum Jaan, Prassthanam, Saaho, Sardar and web series Abhay.

== Personal life ==
Panday married Bhavana Panday (née Khosla) in January 1998. They have two daughters, Ananya, an actress, and Rysa.

== Filmography ==
Key
†	Denotes films that have not yet been released

=== Films ===
Year	Film	Role(s)	Notes	Ref.
1987	Aag Hi Aag	Vijay Singh		
1988	Paap Ki Duniya	Inspector Vijay		
1988	Gunahon Ka Faisla	Sheroo		
1988	Khatron Ke Khiladi	Mahesh		
1988	Tezaab	Babban		
1988	Agnee	Babla		
1989	Ustaad	Inspector Vijay		
1989	Paanch Paapi	Raja/Vijay Singh		
1989	Mitti Aur Sona	Vijay Bhushan		
1989	Kasam Vardi Kee	Ajay Singh		
1989	Ghar Ka Chiraag	Ravi		
1989	Na-Insaafi	Sonu		
1989	Gola Barood	Vijay		
1989	Zakham	Vijay		
1990	Zahreelay	Raju Verma		
1990	Naaka Bandi	Raja Singh		
1990	Aaj Ke Shahenshah	Saawan		
1991	Kohraam	Vijay		
1991	Do Matwale	Amar		
1991	Rupaye Dus Karod	Suraj	Playback singer for "Bandh Khidki Hai"	
1991	Khilaaf	Vikram 'Vicky' Veerpratap Singh		
1991	Jeevan Daata	Shankar		
1992	Parda Hai Parda	Vijay		
1992	Sone Ki Lanka	Rohit		
1992	Naseebwaala	Amar		
1992	Kasak	Suraj		
1992	Vishwatma	Akash Bhardwaj		
1992	Khule-Aam	Surya		
1992	Apradhi	Salim/Ravi		
1993	Aankhen	Ranjeet		
1993	Lootere	Ali		
1993	Police Wala	Jimmy/CBI Officer Jagmohan	Solo male lead	
1994	Gopalaa	Major Anand		
1994	Insaniyat	Hariharan		
1994	Teesra Kaun?	Vijay Verma		
1997	Kaun Rokega Mujhe	Bhola	Solo male lead	
1997	Bhoot Bhungla	Amar		
1997	Swami Keno Ashami	Shaan/Biplob	Bangladeshi film	
1998	Meyerao Manush		Bangladeshi film	
1998	Tirchhi Topiwale	Anand	Solo male lead	
1999	Yeh Hai Mumbai Meri Jaan	Chali D'Souza		
2000	Jwalamukhi	Police inspector Bhola		
2001	Kasam	Fugitive		
2003	Qayamat: City Under Threat	Gopal		
2003	Mumbai Se Aaya Mera Dost	Ajay Singh		
2004	Prem Korechhi Besh Korechhi		Bangladeshi film	
2004	Phool Aur Patthar		Bangladeshi film	
2005	Elaan	Salim		
2005	D	Raghav		
2005	Ssukh	Rakesh Verma		
2006	Apna Sapna Money Money	Rana Jang Bahadur		
2006	Darwaaza Bandh Rakho	Raghu		
2006	Don: The Chase Begins Again	TJ	Special appearance	
2006	I See You	Akshay 'AK' Kapoor		
2007	Fool N Final	Rocky		
2007	Om Shanti Om	Himself	Special appearance	
2008	Hello Darling	Rocky		
2009	Ek: The Power of One	Balli		
2009	Paying Guest	Ronnie		
2009	Sankat City	Sikandar Khan		
2009	Daddy Cool	Harry		
2009	Shortkut	Guru Kapoor		
2009	De Dana Dan	Nonny Chadda		
2010	Click	Manu Sharma		
2010	Housefull	Aakhri Pasta		
2010	Tees Maar Khan	Himself	Special appearance	
2011	Rascals	Bhagat Bhulabhai Chouhan		
2012	Housefull 2	Aakhri Pasta		
2012	Kyaa Super Kool Hain Hum	Baba 3G		
2012	Hum Hai Raahi Car Ke	Khukhri Thapa / Paaji		
2013	Bullett Raja	Lallan Tiwari		
2013	Himmatwala	Michael Jaikishan		
2014	Gang of Ghosts	Gulab Chand		
2014	Humshakals	Bijlani		
2016	Housefull 3	Aakhri Pasta/Aakhri Aastha		
2017	Begum Jaan	Kabir		
2019	Saaho	Devraj	Simultaneously shot in Telugu	
2019	Prassthanam	Bajwa Khatri		
2019	Housefull 4	Aakhri Pasta/Pehla Pasta		
2020	Jawaani Jaaneman	Rajender Sharma aka Rocky		
2020	Vikun Tak	Abdul Lathif	Marathi film	
2022	Nayika Devi: The Warrior Queen	Muhammad Ghori	Gujarati film	
2022	Liger	Pandey	Simultaneously shot in Telugu	
2022	Sardar	Maharaj Rathore	Tamil film	
2024	Vijay 69	Fali Bathena		
2025	Saale Aashiq	Jagdish Bhajmodia		
2025	Housefull 5	Aakhri Pasta		
2025	Detective Sherdil	Bodhi Mama		
2025	Son of Sardaar 2	Danish		
2026	Rahu Ketu	Mordechai		
2026	Hai Jawani Toh Ishq Hona Hai	Dr. Gulati		
2026	Baby Do Die Do			

=== Television series ===
Year	Title	Role	Notes
2008	Zara Nachke Dikha	Judge	
2010	Raaz Pichhle Janam Ka	Contestant	Episode 1
2020	Abhay Season 2	Harsh	
2020–present	Fabulous Lives of Bollywood Wives	Himself	
2022	Baked Season 3: The Bad Trip	Himself	
2023	Pop Kaun?	Anthony Gonsalves	
2024	Industry	Rakesh Raman	
2025	Griha Laxmi	Kareem Kazi	

== Awards and nominations ==
Year	From	Award	Film	Result
1989	Filmfare Awards	Best Supporting Actor	Tezaab	Nominated
2007	Filmfare Awards	Best Performance in a Comic Role	Apna Sapna Money Money	Nominated
2007	IIFA Awards	Best Performance in a Comic Role	Apna Sapna Money Money	Nominated
2013	IIFA Awards	Best Performance in a Comic Role	Housefull 2	Nominated
2013	Zee Cine Awards	Best Actor in a Comic Role	Housefull 2	Nominated
2021	Invertis University	Honorary Doctorate		Won
