= Om Shivpuri =

Indian actor

- Born: 14 July 1938; Patiala, Punjab, British India (Present-day Patiala, Punjab, India)
- Died: 15 October 1990 (aged 52); Mumbai, Maharashtra, India
- Years active: 1964–1990
- Spouse: Sudha Shivpuri
- Children: 2, including Ritu Shivpuri

Om Shivpuri (14 July 1938 – 15 October 1990) was an Indian theatre actor-director and character actor in Hindi films.

A National School of Drama, New Delhi alumnus, Shivpuri became the first chief of the National School of Drama Repertory Company (1964) and one of its actors. He later founded Dishantar, an important theatre group of its era in New Delhi.

== Early life ==
Born in Patiala, Om Shivpuri started his career by working at Jalandhar Radio Station, where Sudha Shivpuri (who later became his wife) was working at the time.

Later, they joined National School of Drama, New Delhi and were trained under theatre doyen Ebrahim Alkazi. After graduating in 1963, they joined the newly formed NSD Repertory Company as actors. Om Shivpuri was also the repertory company's first chief and remained so till 1976 when Manohar Singh followed him.

Meanwhile, Om Shivpuri and Sudha Shivpuri got married in 1968 and started their own theatre group, Dishantar, which went on to become one of Delhi's pioneering theatre groups, and produced many plays with him as a director, the most important being Aadhe Adhure, a classic Hindi play written by Mohan Rakesh; Khamosh! Adalat Jari Hai, Hindi version of Vijay Tendulkar's Marathi play Shantata! Court Chalu Aahe (Silence! The Court is in Session), with his wife Sudha Shivpuri in the lead role; and their most famous production, Girish Karnad's historical play Tughlaq, which was performed at ridges of Talkatora Gardens, New Delhi.

== Films ==
Om Shivpuri started his film career in 1971 with Mani Kaul's Ashadh Ka Ek Din, soon followed by Gulzar's Koshish in 1972.

He shifted to Bombay in 1974. In a career spanning about two decades, he acted in over 175 Hindi films playing roles as varied as villains and supporting cast.

== Personal life ==
His wife Sudha Shivpuri was also a noted TV actor and most known for her role as Baa in the TV serial Kyunki Saas Bhi Kabhi Bahu Thi. The couple has a daughter, Ritu Shivpuri, who is a Hindi film actress and had a son, Vineet.

== Death ==
Om Shivpuri died on 15 October 1990, at the young age of 52, of a heart attack. Several of his films were released after his death.

== Selected filmography ==
- आधे-अधूरे (1969)
- Ashadh Ka Ek Din (1971)
- Koshish (1972)
- Namak Haraam (1973)
- Achanak (1973) as Dr. Chaudhary
- Aandhi (1975)
- Khushboo (1975)
- Sholay (1975)
- Jeevan Jyoti (1976)
- Udhar Ka Sindur (1976)
- Mausam (1975)
- Balika Badhu (1976)
- Sankoch (1976)
- Kitaab (1977)
- Farishta Ya Qatil (1977)
- Hum Kisise Kum Naheen (1977)
- Immaan Dharam (1977)
- Ek Hi Raasta (1977)
- Tumhare Liye (1978)
- Don (1978)
- Naukri (1978)
- Pati Patni Aur Woh (1978)
- Chakravyuha (1978 film)
- Swarag Narak (1978)
- Sarkari Mehmaan (1979)
- The Great Gambler (1979)
- Meera (1979)
- Hum Tere Aashiq Hain (1979)
- Sargam (1979)
- Insaf Ka Tarazu (1980)
- Khubsoorat (1980)
- Phir Wahi Raat (1980)
- Bandish (1980)
- Red Rose (1980)
- The Burning Train (1980)
- Naseeb (1981)
- Kudrat (1981)
- Khoon Ki Takkar (1981)
- Meri Aawaz Suno (1981)
- Fiffty Fiffty (1981)
- Zamaane Ko Dikhana Hai (1981)
- Teesri Ankh (1982)
- Samraat (1982)
- Bemisal (1982)
- Yeh To Kamaal Ho Gaya (1982)
- Arth (1982)
- Disco Dancer (1982)
- Painter Babu (1983)
- Prem Tapasya (1983)
- Andhaa Kaanoon (1983)
- Coolie (1983)
- Divorce (1984)
- Aaj Ka M.L.A. Ram Avtar (1984)
- Sardaar (1984)...Thakur Shamsher Singh
- Maqsad (1984)
- Naya Kadam (1984)
- Asha Jyoti (1984)
- Hum Dono (1985)
- Masterji (1985)
- Insaaf Main Karoonga (1985)
- Aandhi-Toofan (1985)
- Adventures of Tarzan (1985)
- Ghulami (1985)
- Geraftaar (1985)
- Alag Alag (1985)
- Dekha Pyar Tumhara (1985)
- Saveraywali Gaadi (1986)
- Aakhree Raasta (1986)
- Shatru (1986)
- Madadgaar (1987)
- Dance Dance (1987)
- Sitapur Ki Geeta (1987)
- Main Aur Tum (1987)
- Kudrat Ka Kanoon (1987)
- Hamara Khandaan (1988)
- Zakhmi Aurat (1988)
- Hatya (1988)
- Namumkin (1988)
- Ek Naya Rishta (1988) as Shankar Dayal Tandon
- Khatron Ke Khiladi (1988)
- Kanwarlal (1988)
- Biwi Ho To Aisi (1988)
- Sachai Ki Taqat (1989)
- Mitti Aur Sona (1989)
- Galiyon Ka Badshah (1989)
- Daata (1989)
- Gola Barood (1989)
- Aag Ka Gola (1989)
- Jurrat (1989)
- Apna Desh Paraye Log (1989)
- Kasam Suhaag Ki (1989)
- Gentleman (1989)
- Kahan Hai Kanoon (1989)
- Ghar Ka Chiraag (1989)
- Naag Nagin (1990)...Mr.Rai
- Amiri Garibi (1990)
- Swarg (1990)
- Sailaab (1990)
- Jurm (1990)
- Veeru Dada (1990), Only Photograph in Photoframe (Cameo Role)
- Khooni Raat (1991)
- Narsimha (1991)
- Shanti Kranti (1991)
- Rupaye Dus Karod (1991)
- Humlaa (1992)
- Zulm Ki Hukumat (1992)
- Kis Mein Kitna Hai Dum (1992) as SSP Verma
- Yugandhar (1993)
- Policewala (1993)
- Aakhri Sanghursh (1997)

== Legacy ==
Rajasthan Sangeet Natak Akademi organises a drama festival every year, in the memory of Om Shivpuri. The Om Shivpuri Memorial Drama Festival is a five-day festival that opens on 16 October (Om Shivpuri's death anniversary).

== See also ==
- Theatre in India
