= Aashiqui (soundtrack) =

Soundtrack album by Nadeem–Shravan
- Released: 26 December 1989
- Recorded: 1989
- Studio: Sudeep Studios Pvt. Ltd.
- Genres: Bollywood film soundtrack; Filmi-ghazal
- Length: 58:13
- Languages: Hindi; Urdu
- Label: T-Series
- Director: Mahesh Bhatt
- Producer: Gulshan Kumar

Nadeem–Shravan chronology
Pyar Pyar (1990)	Aashiqui (1989)	Apmaan Ki Aag (1990)

The soundtrack to the 1990 Hindi-language romantic musical film Aashiqui features twelve songs composed by Nadeem–Shravan (a duo consisting of Nadeem Saifi and Shravan Rathod) and lyrics written by Sameer, Rani Mallik and Madan Pal. Released by T-Series on 26 December 1989, it became the highest-selling Bollywood soundtrack of all time with around 2 crore units sold. Its success established the duo to become one of the leading music composers in the Hindi film industry.

== Background ==
Nadeem–Shravan were recommended by singer Anuradha Paudwal to Gulshan Kumar, the founder of Super Cassettes Industries (parent company of T-Series). Gulshan replied that his company was not producing films at that point time, instead interested on curating a studio album and asked the duo to record few songs, further adding that if he liked their compositions, he would recommend another producer who would express their interest on making a film.

The duo then brought lyricist Sameer and playback singer Kumar Sanu, to record the songs under the tentative title Chahat; the first song they recorded was "Main Duniya Bhula Doonga". After curating around five to six songs, director Mahesh Bhatt happened to hear them and was impressed with it, eventually deciding to write a story surrounding those songs which became Aashiqui. He further insisted Sameer to write the title track, which became "Bas Ek Sanam Chaahiye".

After production being completed, Gulshan contacted Sameer saying that though people felt the film's music was great, it sounded more than an independent album rather than a soundtrack for the film, admitting that Gulshan eventually planned to release the album only instead of the film. Bhatt met Gulshan and assured that he would quit direction, if the soundtrack to the film becomes unsuccessful. As per the latter's suggestion, Mahesh eventually released a poster with lead pair Rahul Roy and Anu Agarwal were shown hiding under a jacket, in order to avoid revealing the actors in the promotional material. The album was eventually released on 26 December 1989, months before the film's theatrical release. Most of the songs fall under the filmi-ghazal genre, based on the ghazal style.

== Track listing ==
No.	Title	Lyrics	Performer(s)	Length
1.	"Jaan-E-Jigar Jaaneman" (Version 1)	Sameer	Kumar Sanu, Anuradha Paudwal	5:12
2.	"Main Duniya Bhula Doonga"	Sameer	Kumar Sanu, Anuradha Paudwal	5:18
3.	"Ek Sanam Chahiye Aashiqui Ke Liye" (Male)	Sameer	Kumar Sanu	6:12
4.	"Nazar Ke Samne"	Sameer	Kumar Sanu, Anuradha Paudwal	5:35
5.	"Tu Meri Zindagi Hai"	Sameer	Kumar Sanu, Anuradha Paudwal	4:45
6.	"Dil Ka Aalam (Not in film)"	Madan Pal	Kumar Sanu	5:00
7.	"Ab Tere Bin" (Raga Ahir Bhairav)	Sameer	Kumar Sanu	5:46
8.	"Dheere 0.0 Dheere Se Meri Zindagi Mein Aana"	Rani Malik	Kumar Sanu, Anuradha Paudwal	5:29
9.	"Mera Dil Tere Liye"	Sameer	Udit Narayan, Anuradha Paudwal	4:34
10.	"Ek Sanam Chahiye Aashiqui Ke Liye" (Female)	Sameer	Anuradha Paudwal	6:11
11.	"Jaan-E-Jigar Jaaneman" (Version 2)	Sameer	Kumar Sanu, Anuradha Paudwal	3:55
Total length:				57:00

== Reception ==
Rakesh Bandhu of PlanetBollywood.com described the soundtrack as "a collection of beautiful compositions" by the duo and assigned a score of 9 (out of 10). Gautam Chintamani of Scroll.in described the duo's arrangement as "a mix of the traditional sounds of Shankar–Jaikishan and Laxmikant–Pyarelal and the melody of R. D. Burman with a dash of Bappi Lahiri and Anand–Milind". He also noted the similarities of "Jaane Jigar Jaaneman" with Lahiri's "Duniya Mein Tere Siva" from Aandhiyan (1990), and "Mera Dil Tere Liye" being inspired from John Farnham's "You're the Voice". The Song Jaan-e-Jigar Janeman was copy from a song 1984 Pakistani movie Dooriyan " Bas Ek Tere Siwa sung by Mehnaz & Akhlaq Ahmed composedby Robin Ghosh" available on spotify also indian film Aandhiyan also a complete copy of said film with same song.

== Sales and records ==
Aashiqui became the highest-selling soundtrack album in the history of Indian music industry. Each cassette of the film's soundtrack was priced at ₹22. It sold over 2 crore units upon release, becoming the best-selling Bollywood soundtrack of all time. According to Bhushan Kumar, the current chairman and managing director of T-Series, no other Hindi film soundtrack had managed to surpass its records.

Aashiqui's soundtrack was ranked at number 15 on the BBC Asian Network website, while PlanetBollywood.com ranked it at number 4 on their "100 Greatest Bollywood Soundtracks of All Time", and at 76 on "Top 100 Bollywood Albums" by Film Companion.

== Impact ==
The success of Aashiqui's soundtrack eventually impacted the musical styles of Bollywood with the revival of filmi-ghazal music in the early 1990s. Popular film soundtracks such as Dil (1990), Saajan (1991), Phool Aur Kaante (1991) and Deewana (1992) particularly fall in that genre. With the success of Aashiqui, T-Series established as the leading music label in India; its annual earnings grew from ₹20 crore in 1985, to ₹200 crore in 1991 and ₹500 crore in 1997.

Aashiqui established Nadeem–Shravan's popularity as a leading music composer in the Hindi film industry during the early-1990s. However, following the murder of T-Series founder Gulshan Kumar by the Mumbai underworld syndicate D-Company, the duo's film career came to a halt with Nadeem Saifi initially accused of involvement, before later being exonerated, and eventually made a comeback in the 2000s.

A cover version of the song "Dheere Dheere" was composed and performed by Yo Yo Honey Singh and released as a single on 2 September 2015, with an accompanying music video featuring Hrithik Roshan and Sonam Kapoor. Although the song was commercially successful, Nadeem Saifi criticised Singh for not crediting the original artists of the song and claimed that he did not obtain permission from the composers to recreate the version. he demanded legal action against Singh regarding the same, albeit Singh described the song as a tribute to the film.

== See also ==
- Aashiqui 2 (soundtrack)
