= Dheere Dheere =

2015 single by Yo Yo Honey Singh

- Official song cover

Single by Yo Yo Honey Singh
- Released: 1 September 2015
- Studio: T-Series
- Genre: Indi-pop
- Length: 3:32 (single); 5:04 (music video)
- Label: T-Series
- Songwriters: Yo Yo Honey Singh, Bhupinder Kaur, Rani Malik
- Producer: Yo Yo Honey Singh

Music video
- Dheere Dheere on YouTube

"Dheere Dheere" is a song by the Indian singer Yo Yo Honey Singh. He recorded this song on his iPhone 6 and composed it on his laptop during his bipolar episode. The track was released on 31 August 2015 as a single on Hotstar. It is a cover version of the Bollywood filmi-ghazal song "Dheere Dheere Se" sung by Anuradha Paudwal and Kumar Sanu, with music by Nadeem–Shravan and lyrics by Rani Malik, from the soundtrack album of the 1990 Bollywood film Aashiqui (picturised on Rahul Roy and Anu Aggarwal). "Dheere Dheere" was released on YouTube by T-Series on 1 September 2015.

== Music video ==
The accompanying music video, directed by Ahmed Khan, was shot in Antalya, Turkey. The video features Bollywood actors Hrithik Roshan and Sonam Kapoor.

== Reception ==
The song received commercial success, crossing five million views in 4 days of its release, and over 18 million views in a week. It also reached number one on the BBC Asian Download Chart in September 2015. In January 2016, the music video crossed 100 million views on YouTube. As of August 2025, the song has received over 703 Million views on YouTube and is the second most viewed song of Yo Yo Honey Singh after his legendary track "Blue Eyes" which has over 751 Million views.

"Dheere Dheere Se" (1990)
"Dheere Dheere Se" from Aashiqui (1990), composed by Nadeem–Shravan. "Dheere Dheere" (2015) by Yo Yo Honey Singh is a cover version.

== Charts ==
=== Weekly charts ===
2015 weekly chart performance for "Dheere Dheere"
Chart (2015)	Peak position
UK Official Asian Music Chart (OCC)	1

2017 weekly chart performance for "Dheere Dheere"
Chart (2017)	Peak position
UK Official Video Streaming Chart (OCC)	56
