= 36th Filmfare Awards =

1991 awards for Hindi cinema

- Date: 1991

Highlights
- Best Film: Ghayal
- Critics Award for Best Film: Kasba
- Most awards: Ghayal (7)
- Most nominations: Dil & Ghayal (8)

The 36th Filmfare Awards for Hindi cinema were held in 1991.

Dil and Ghayal led the ceremony with 8 nominations each, followed by Aashiqui with 7 nominations, and Agneepath and Pratibandh with 5 nominations each.

Ghayal won 7 awards, including Best Film, Best Director (for Rajkumar Santoshi) and Best Actor (for Sunny Deol), thus becoming the most-awarded film at the ceremony.

Madhuri Dixit won her first of four awards for Best Actress for her performance in Dil, the only win for the film.

Out of 7 nominations, Aashiqui won 4 awards ruling over all the Music Award categories.

== Main awards ==
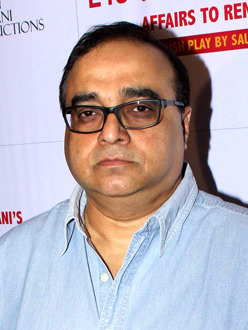
Rajkumar Santoshi – Best Director & Best Story Writer winner for Ghayal

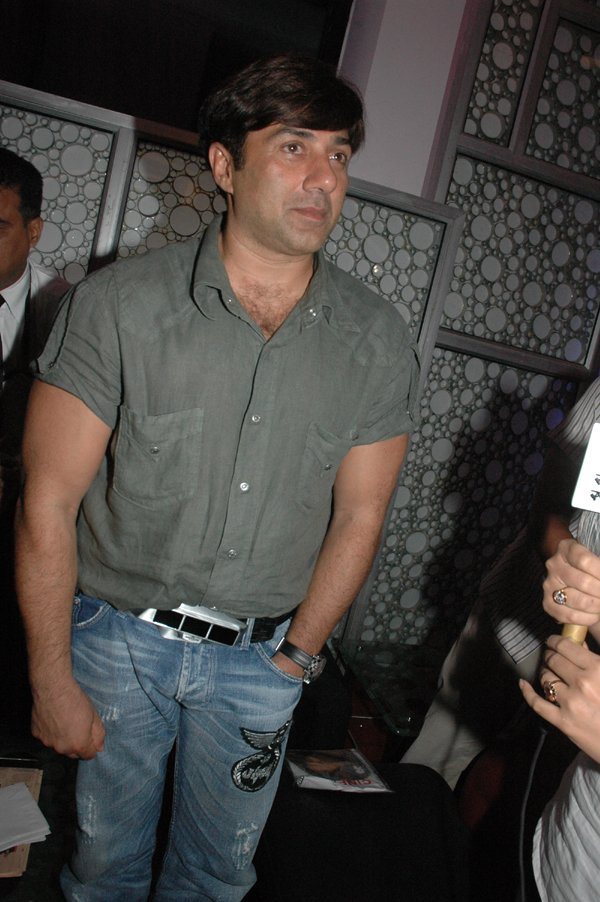
Sunny Deol – Best Actor winner for Ghayal

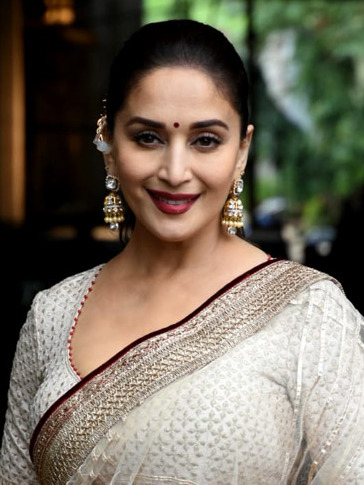
Madhuri Dixit – Best Actress winner for Dil

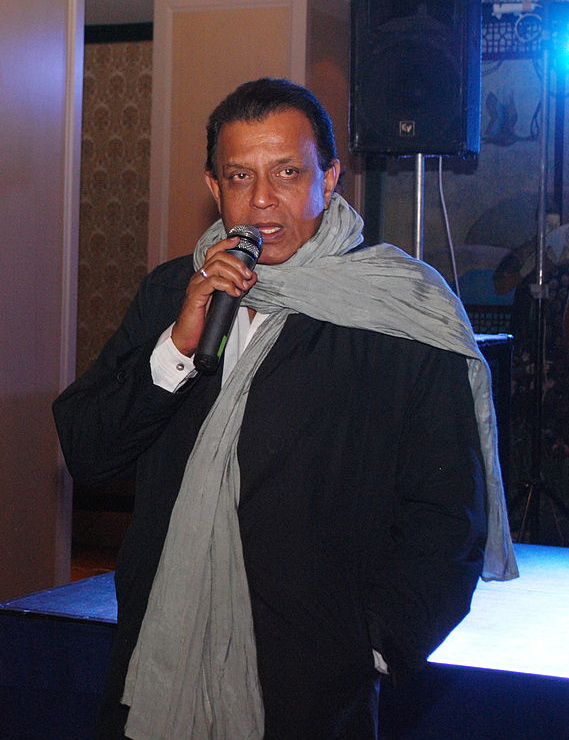
Mithun Chakraborty – Best Supporting Actor winner for Agneepath

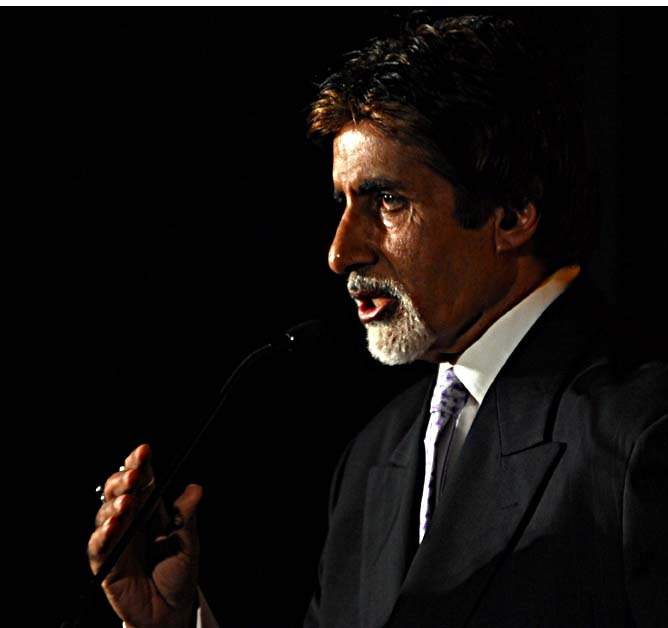
Amitabh Bachchan – Lifetime Achievement Awardee

=== Best Film ===
Ghayal

- Agneepath
- Dil
- Pratibandh

=== Best Director ===
Rajkumar Santoshi – Ghayal

- Mahesh Bhatt – Aashiqui
- Mukul Anand – Agneepath
- Ravi Raja – Pratibandh

=== Best Actor ===
Sunny Deol – Ghayal

- Aamir Khan – Dil
- Amitabh Bachchan – Agneepath
- Chiranjeevi – Pratibandh

=== Best Actress ===
Madhuri Dixit – Dil

- Hema Malini – Rihaee
- Juhi Chawla – Pratibandh
- Meenakshi Sheshadri – Jurm

=== Best Supporting Actor ===
Mithun Chakraborty – Agneepath

- Anupam Kher – Dil
- Om Puri – Ghayal
- Rami Reddy – Pratibandh

=== Best Supporting Actress ===
Rohini Hattangadi – Agneepath

- Radhika – Aaj Ka Arjun
- Reema Lagoo – Aashiqui
- Sangeeta Bijlani – Jurm

=== Best Comic Actor ===
Kader Khan – Baap Numbri Beta Dus Numbri

=== Lux New Face of the Year ===
Pooja Bhatt – Daddy

=== Best Story ===
Ghayal – Rajkumar Santoshi

=== Best Screenplay ===
Kamla Ki Maut – Basu Chatterjee

=== Best Dialogue ===
Daddy – Suraj Sanim

=== Best Music Director ===
Aashiqui – Nadeem Shravan

- Aaj Ka Arjun – Bappi Lahiri
- Baaghi: A Rebel for Love – Anand–Milind
- Dil – Anand–Milind

=== Best Lyricist ===
Aashiqui – Sameer for Nazar Ke Saamne

- Aashiqui – Rani Malik for Dheere Dheere
- Dil – Sameer for Mujhe Neend Na Aaye

=== Best Playback Singer, Male ===
Aashiqui – Kumar Sanu for Ab Tere Bin

- Baaghi: A Rebel for Love – Amit Kumar for Kaisa Lagta Hai
- Dil – Suresh Wadkar for O Priya

=== Best Playback Singer, Female ===
Aashiqui – Anuradha Paudwal for Nazar Ke Saamne

- Baaghi: A Rebel for Love – Kavita Krishnamurthy for Chandni Raat
- Dil – Anuradha Paudwal for Mujhe Neend Na Aaye

=== Best Art Direction ===
Ghayal

=== Best Choreography ===
Sailaab – Saroj Khan for Hum Ko Aaj

=== Best Cinematography ===
Ghayal

=== Best Editing ===
Ghayal

=== Best Sound ===
E. Rudra – Azaad Desh Ke Ghulam

=== Lifetime Achievement Award ===
Amitabh Bachchan

== Critics' awards ==
=== Best Film ===
Kasba

=== Outstanding Performance in a Non-commercial Film ===
Anupam Kher – Daddy

=== Special Jury Mention ===
Aadhi Haqeeqat, Aadha Fasana – Dilip Ghosh

=== Best Documentary ===
Amjad Ali Khan

== Most wins ==
- Ghayal – 7/8
- Aashiqui – 4/7
- Agneepath – 2/5
- Daddy – 2/2
- Dil – 1/8

== See also ==
- 38th Filmfare Awards
- 37th Filmfare Awards
- Filmfare Awards
