= Rakesh Bedi =

Indian film, stage and television actor (born 1954)

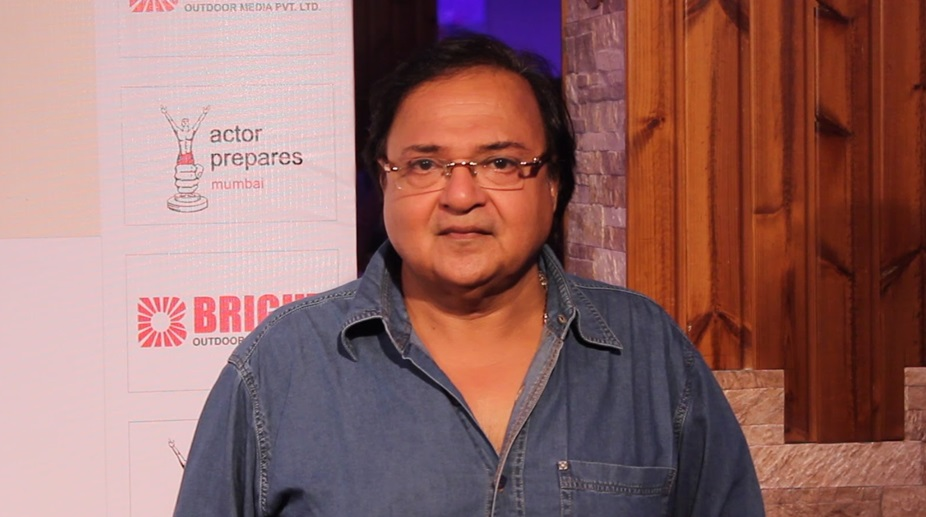
- Bedi in 2017
- Born: 1 December 1954 (age 71); New Delhi, India
- Education: Film and Television Institute of India
- Occupation: Actor
- Years active: 1976–present
- Spouse: Aradhana Bedi
- Children: 2

Rakesh Bedi (born 1 December 1954) is an Indian actor who works in Hindi cinema. He has appeared in more than 150 of films since the 1970s, with many television and stage shows. He is known for his iconic comic roles in films such as Chashme Buddoor (1981) and Mera Damad (1985). Bedi was widely praised for his role as Jameel Jamali in the spy action-thriller duology Dhurandhar (i.e., Dhurandhar (2025) and Dhurandhar: The Revenge (2026)). He has also appeared in television shows like Yeh Jo Hai Zindagi (1984), Shrimaan Shrimati (1994–1997), Yes Boss (1999–2009), Bhabhi Ji Ghar Par Hain (2015–2026), and Taarak Mehta Ka Ooltah Chashmah (2020–present).

== Early life and education ==
Bedi completed his studies in Delhi. He went to Kendriya Vidyalaya in Andrews Ganj, Delhi. While Bedi was in school, he used to participate in Mono Acting competitions. Bedi has also worked with the New Delhi theatre group Pierrot's Troupe and studied acting at the Film and Television Institute of India, Pune.

Bedi is married to Aradhana Bedi; and is father to Ridhima Bedi and Ritika Bedi.

== Career ==
Bedi started his film career as a supporting actor in the 1979 film Hamare Tumhare, starring Sanjeev Kumar, and then went on to act in over 150 films and several TV serials.

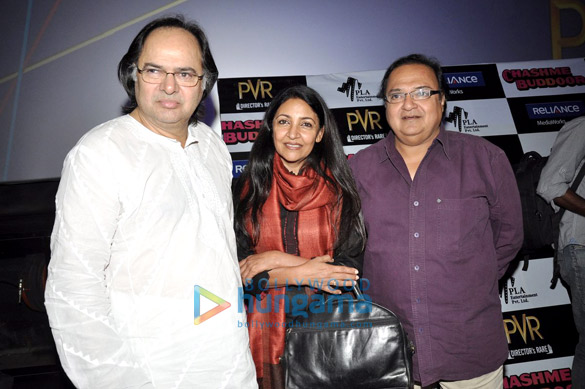
Rakesh Bedi with Farooq Sheikh and Deepti Naval at the special screening of Chashme Buddoor

Some of his most memorable roles were in the 1981 film Chashme Buddoor with Farooq Shaikh and Ravi Baswani and Ek Duuje Ke Liye directed by K. Balachander and in the TV sitcoms Shrimaan Shrimati (1995), Yes Boss (1999–2009) as Mohan Srivastava, his one of best role and he is much appreciated for this and Yeh Jo Hai Zindagi (1984), written by Sharad Joshi and directed by Kundan Shah.

He hosted Science with BrainCafé, a science show on ZeeQ, and continues doing theatre in Mumbai. Notably, he played 24 different characters in Vijay Tendulkar's popular one-man play Massage. In 2012, he appeared on his first television drama daily soap, Shubh Vivah. Since 2015, he appears on television show Bhabiji Ghar Par Hain!.

He was widely praised for portraying the role of Jameel Jamali in the Dhurandhar duology, where specially his dialogue "Mera Baccha Hai Tu" gained circulation on social media and in memes and short-form video content. Several brands and agencies, including Delhi Police, Wai Wai, Haldiram's, and Vadilal, adapted the dialogue for marketing campaigns.

== Filmography ==
Key
†	Denotes films that have not yet been released

=== Film ===
Year	Title	Role	Notes
1976	Bonga	Thief	Short film
1979	Hamare Tumhare	Sunil	
1979	Ahsaas	Harry	
1980	Bulundi	Pawan Bakhri	
1981	Chashme Buddoor	Omi	
1981	Ek Duuje Ke Liye	Chakravarty 'Chakram'	
1982	Anmol Sitaare	Kaushik Srivastav	
1982	Saath Saath	Rakesh	
1982	Yeh Vaada Raha	Gogi	
1982	Teesri Aankh	Kaushik Tiwari	
1982	Teri Kasam	Tony's friend	
1982	Apna Bana Lo	Hanger	
1982	Pyaar Mein Sauda Nahin		
1983	Lovers	Fatty	
1983	Painter Babu	Saajan	
1983	Kalaakaar	Chander	
1983	Do Gulab		
1983	Ek Jaan Hain Hum	Mothu	
1984	Sohni Mahiwal	Salamat	
1984	Anand Aur Anand	Ravi	
1984	Phulwari	Pyare	
1984	Hum Hain Lajawaab	Marorimal Karodimal Thakkatram Makhanwala a.k.a. 'M.G.M.'	
1985	Aaj Ka Daur	Vinod	
1985	Mera Damad	Ravi	
1985	Jaan Ki Baazi	Police Constable Tendulkar	
1985	Ram Teri Ganga Maili	Piyush	
1986	Duty	Ramu	
1986	Saveray Wali Gaadi	Prasad	
1986	Naseeb Apna Apna	Deepak	
1986	Dharm Adhikari	Lallu	
1986	Asli Naqli	Sub-Inspector Chamanlal	
1986	Main Balwaan	Gambler	
1987	Jawab Hum Denge	Constable Sher Singh	
1987	Dadagiri	Roshan B. Singh	
1987	Hawalaat	Police Constable Handa	
1987	Marte Dam Tak		
1987	Param Dharam	Kaushik	
1988	Shoorveer	Jeevan	
1988	Jungle Ki Beti		
1988	Ek Hi Maqsad	Stage Actor Preetam	
1988	Pyaar Mohabbat		
1988	Hatya	Restaurant Owner	
1988	Parbat Ke Us Paar	Dhol	
1989	Naqab	Hamza	
1989	Kahan Hai Kanoon	Government Peon	
1989	Meri Zabaan	Gone	
1989	Main Tera Dushman	Police Constable Chustiram	
1989	Anjaane Rishte	Kapil Mohan	
1989	Bahurani	Shrikanth Choudhury	
1990	Naaka Bandi	Tularam	
1990	Amavas Ki Raat	Inspector Kaushik Sharma	
1990	Maa Kasam Badla Loonga	Mr. Bond	
1990	Izzatdaar		
1990	Azaad Desh Ke Gulam	Daulatram / Havaldar Kulkarni	
1990	Police Public	Lallulal	
1990	Awwal Number		
1990	Apmaan Ki Aag	Vasu	
1991	Meet Mere Man Ke	Gopi	
1991	Jungle Beauty		
1991	Pyar Bhara Dil	Prakash	
1991	Numbri Aadmi	Rakesh	
1991	Swarg Jaisaa Ghar	Dulare	
1991	Banjaran	Sarju	
1991	Benaam Badsha	Ganpat's nephew	
1991	Afsana Pyar Ka	Rakesh	
1991	Dil Hai Ki Manta Nahin	Private Detective	
1992	Abhi Abhi	College Student	
1992	Aaja Meri Jaan	Bataklal	
1992	Heer Ranjha	Lutan	
1992	Yudhpath	David	
1992	Chamatkar	Moti	
1992	Aaj Ka Goonda Raaj	Govind Ahuja (Guddu)	
1992	Junoon	Himanshu	
1992	Dilwale Kabhi Na Hare	Pandit Aladdin Jagat Mama	
1993	Hasti	Changu	
1993	Tirangaa	Khabrilal	
1993	Insaniyat Ke Devta	Dholakia	
1993	Aankhen	Gulshan Kapoor a.k.a. 'Gullu'	
1993	Aashiq Awara	Gulu	
1993	Zakhmo Ka Hisaab	Gyani's assistant	
1993	Gardish	Shiva's friend	
1993	Hum Hain Kamaal Ke	Constable Heera	
1993	Aadmi	Usmaan	
1994	Deewana Sanam		
1994	Dilbar	Gujariya	
1994	Mohabbat Ki Arzoo	Anna's assistant	
1994	Hanste Khelte	Om	
1994	Gangster		
1994	Zid	Pyare Singh	
1994	Dulaara	Murari Lal	
1994	Sholay Aur Toofan	Pandit Kaushik	
1994	Insaniyat	Dead Body Driver	
1994	Betaaj Badshah	Bachchu Lahiri	
1994	Cheetah	Lacchoo	
1994	Kranti Kshetra	Professor Kaushik Choudhry	
1994	Rakhwale	Ahimsa	
1994	Aao Pyar Karen	Pandit Kashiram	
1994	Zaalim	Rakesh	
1994	Mr. Azaad	Police Constable Khotey	
1994	Teesra Kaun?	Khoka Ganguly	
1995	Aaj Ka Maseeha		
1995	Ghar Ka Kanoon		
1995	Pyar Karnewale Kabhi Kam Na Honge		
1995	Vartmaan		
1995	Mera Damad	Ravi	
1995	God and Gun	Bhola	
1995	Bewafa Sanam	Prisoner Inmate No. 204	
1995	Paappi Devataa		
1995	Paappi Farishtey		
1995	Takkar	Convict Kaku	
1996	Daanveer	Kalyan's servant	
1996	Vishwasghaat	Police Constable Lepatakde	
1996	Vijeta	Madanlal	
1996	Megha	College student	
1996	Vishwasghaat	Havaldar Lepatakde	
1996	Saajan Chale Sasural	Hotel Waiter	
1996	Diljale	Rajasaheb's son	
1997	Nirnayak		
1997	Aakhri Sanghursh		
1997	Mere Sapno Ki Rani	Gate-crasher	
1997	Hero No. 1	Sharma	
1997	Bhai Bhai	Constable	
1997	Suraj	Pyare Singh / Makhan	
1997	Yes Boss	Bahadur	
1997	Vishwavidhaata	Johnny	
1997	Betaabi	Peon at Dayal College	
1997	Tarazu	Balm Advertiser	
1997	Mr. & Mrs. Khiladi	Ram Babu	
1998	Dildaara	Dharamveer	
1998	Deewana Hoon Pagal Nahi		
1998	Laash		
1998	Phool Bane Patthar	Constable Chunnu	
1998	Mohabbat Aur Jung	Saajan	
1998	Gharwali Baharwali	Chopra	
1998	Hatya Kaand	Kaushik Mishra	
1998	Tirchhi Topiwale		
1998	Bade Miyan Chote Miyan	Makkan	
1998	Prem Aggan	Hiralal	
1999	Jaalsaaz		
1999	Chandaal Aatma		
1999	Manchala		
1999	Hum Aapke Dil Mein Rehte Hain	Salim	
1999	Phool Aur Aag	Police Constable Gopi	
1999	Pyaar Koi Khel Nahin	College Principal	
2000	Glamour Girl	Saxena	
2000	Dulhan Hum Le Jayenge	Photographer	
2000	Baaghi		
2000	Hadh Kar Di Aapne	Mr. Chelaramani	
2000	Aaghaaz	Dilip Roy	
2000	Beti No. 1	Bachalal	
2000	Raja Ko Rani Se Pyar Ho Gaya	Balu	
2001	Hum Deewane Pyar Ke	Tiklu	
2001	Uljhan	Shyam	
2001	Gadar: Ek Prem Katha	Vaid Ji	
2001	Ittefaq	Constable Pandit Singh Kaushik	
2001	Deewaanapan	Raju	
2001	Meri Adaalat	Natwar	
2002	Bharat Bhagya Vidhata	Inspector Chaman Lal	
2002	Be-Lagaam	Banarasi Babu with Tanveer Zaidi	
2002	Yeh Mohabbat Hai	Chacha	
2002	Om Jai Jagadish	Ram Prasad a.k.a. 'RP'	
2002	Waah! Tera Kya Kehna	Murari's opponent	
2003	Talaash: The Hunt Begins...	Passenger on train	
2003	Jodi Kya Banayi Wah Wah Ramji	Poptallal	
2003	Raja Bhaiya	Dr. Chandula Chatterjee	
2004	Suno Sasurjee	Mrs. Gunkari's Advocate	
2004	Rok Sako To Rok Lo	Ghodbole	
2005	Vaada	Advocate Saxena	
2005	Deewane Huye Paagal	Gullu Mulchandani	
2005	The Film	Music Director Pappi Da	
2006	Rehguzar	Big B	
2006	Mere Jeevan Saathi	Mac	
2006	Jigyaasa	Ashok Kumar Shaayar	
2006	Tom, Dick, and Harry	Happy Singh	
2006	Sarhad Paar	Dhola Singh	
2007	Main Rony Aur Jony		
2007	Good Boy, Bad Boy	Mr. Prem Malhotra	
2007	Marigold	Manoj Sharma	
2008	Don Muthu Swami	Shikharchand	
2008	Khallballi: Fun Unlimited		
2009	Jai Veeru	Motel Manager	
2009	Anubhav	Film Producer	
2009	Aagey Se Right	Police Commissioner Digvijay Mathur	
2009	Love Ka Taddka	Jhula Ramani	
2010	The Camp	Jarnail Singh	
2010	Prem Kaa Game	Roopchand Rathod	
2011	Naughty @ 40	Dayashankar	
2011	Chaloo	Tunnaswami	
2011	One Room Kitchen	Gujrati Broker	Marathi film
2012	Delhi Eye		
2012	Kevi Rite Jaish	Daulatram Chainani	Gujarati film
2012	Mere Dost Picture Abhi Baki Hai	Monty	
2013	Rabba Main Kya Karoon	Sneha's father	
2014	Dil Ka Sauda		
2015	Downtown	Car Salesman	
2015	Thoda Luft Thoda Ishq	Boss	
2015	Chehere: A Modern Day Classic		
2015	Baankey Ki Crazy Baraat	Nandlal	
2015	Hum Sab Ullu Hain	Harshal Mehta	
2016	Chipku		
2017	Muskurahatien	Prof. Tharaki	
2017	Babuji Ek Ticket Bambai		
2017	Game Over	Seth Girdharilal	
2018	Rashtraputra	Dr. Daruwala	
2019	Uri: The Surgical Strike	Pakistani Intelligence Officer	
2019	Triple Seat	Jehangir Irani	Marathi film
2020	Sab Kushal Mangal	Kamta Prasad	
2020	Indoo Ki Jawani	Prem	
2020	Coolie No. 1	Driver / Shalini's father	
2023	Chhatriwali	Madan Chacha	
2023	Zara Hatke Zara Bachke	Harcharan Chawla	
2023	Gadar 2	Kimtilal	
2023	The Rise of Sudarshan Chakra	Munim	
2024	Teri Baaton Mein Aisa Uljha Jiya	Aryan's father	
2024	Vicky Vidya Ka Woh Wala Video	Vidya's father	
2024	Kahan Shuru Kahan Khatam	Krish's father	
2025	Dhurandhar	Jameel Jamali	
2026	Dhurandhar: The Revenge	Jameel Jamali	
2026	Hai Jawani Toh Ishq Hona Hai	Selfie Kumar	

=== Television ===
Year	Title	Role	Notes
1984–1985	Yeh Jo Hai Zindagi	Raja	
1990	Guniraam	Guniraam	
1992	Yeh Duniya Ghazab Ki	Nihal	
1993	Filmi Chakkar	Bahadur	
1993	Zabaan Sambhalke	Paploo	
1994–1999	Shrimaan Shrimati	Dilruba Jarnail Singh Khurana	
1995	Rahat	Rakesh	
1996	All The Best	Thief	
1998–1999	Jaane Bhi Do Paro		
1998–2001	Hum Sab Ek Hain	Mohan Khachroo	
1999–2009	Yes Boss	Mohan Srivastava	
1999–2000	Gubbare		
2007	F.I.R.	Various characters	
2010	Ring Wrong Ring	Late Dinanath Chouhan	
2015–2016	Sumit Sambhal Lega	Satbir Ahluwalia	
2015–2025	Bhabi Ji Ghar Par Hai!	Bhoorey Lal	
2016	Sahib Biwi Aur Boss	Various characters	
2016	Khidki	Boss of Aloknath Tripathi	
2016	Beyhadh	Mr. Malkhani	
2016–2017	Y.A.R.O Ka Tashan	Professor Govardhan Aggarwal	
2020–present	Taarak Mehta Ka Ooltah Chashmah	Babulal Chhedilal Mitha	
2022	Wah Bhai Wah	Himself	
2022	Home Shanti	Organiser of Kavi Sammelan	
2023	Mushaira	Professor	
2023	Chamak	Teja Grewal	
2023	Humorously Yours	Jaadugar	
2023	Rafta Rafta	Mr. Sharma	
2026	Raakh	Ghanhsyam	

== Theatre ==
Rakesh Bedi has appeared in Hindi stage productions including Massage and Taj Mahal Ka Tender.

In 2018, he acted in and directed the comedy play Wrong Number, produced by Rahul Bhuchar under the banner of Felicity Theatre.

The same year, he wrote, directed and acted in Jab We Separated, alongside Shweta Tiwari and Rahul Bhuchar.

In 2019, he directed the play Patte Khul Gaye, produced by Rahul Bhuchar for Felicity Theatre, featuring Anant Mahadevan, Roopali Ganguly and Kishwar Merchant.

== Dubbing ==
=== Live action films ===
Title	Actor(s)	Character(s)	Dub language	Original language	Original Year release	Dub Year release	Notes
Dumbo	Danny DeVito	Max Medici	Hindi	English	2019	2019	

== Accolades ==
Year	Award	Category	Work	Result
1982	Filmfare Awards	Best Actor in a Comic Role	Chashme Buddoor	Nominated
2008	Indian Telly Awards	Best Actor in a Comic Role	Yes Boss	Nominated
