= Mera Damad =

- Directed by: Partho Ghosh
- Written by: Partho Ghosh
- Produced by: Shipra Biswas; Tushar Mazumdar
- Starring: Farooq Sheikh; Zarina Wahab; Bhagwan Dada; Utpal Dutt; Tariq Khan; Jankidas; Ashok Kumar
- Cinematography: Ratan Mukherjee
- Edited by: Kashinath Mahajan
- Music by: Songs: Salil Chowdhury; Background Score: Babul Bose
- Release date: 8 March 1985
- Country: India
- Language: Hindi

Mera Damad is a 1985 family-drama Indian Hindi film directed by Partho Ghosh and produced by Shipra Biswas and Tushar Mazumdar. It stars Utpal Dutt, Ashok Kumar, Farooq Sheikh, Zarina Wahab, Rakesh Bedi, Prema Narayan, Tariq Khan and Jankidas. Dialogue writer was Sharad Joshi and Play back singing was done by Amit Kumar, Anuradha Paudwal, Shailendra Singh, Kavita Krishnamurty and Sabita Chowdhury whereas Music for the film was scored by Salil Choudhury and background music by Babul Bose.

== Plot ==
Sitanath Ardhnarayan Choudhry and Ajit Khanna are old friends. Sitanath has a daughter named Sunita, and Ajit has a son named Jai. Both fathers would like their respective children to meet each other and get married. In order to do this, Ajit asks Jai to travel to Sitanath's village, meet Sunita, and if found compatible, make arrangements for marriage, to which Jai agrees to. On reaching Rampur railway station, Jai, in the company of his friend, Pradeep, come across a man named Ravi, who tells them they are in the wrong village, and directs them to a mansion run by an eccentric owner, so that they can spend the night there, and then take the train back the next day. Ravi warns them about the owner, who likes to talk all night to anyone who listens. Both Jai and Pradeep meet the owner, and are quite abrupt with him. The next day, Jai meets the owner's daughter Kimi, and falls in love with her.

== Cast ==
- Farooq Sheikh as Jai Khanna
- Zarina Wahab as Kimi/Sunita
- Ashok Kumar as Barrister Ajit Khanna
- Utpal Dutt as Sitanath Chaudhary
- Prema Narayan as Shalu
- Jankidas as Shalu's bapu
- Rakesh Bedi as Ravi
- Praveen Paul as Smt. Chaudhary
- Priyadarshini as Jharna
- Bhagwan Dada as drunkard
- Ava Mukherjee (as Abha Mukherjee) as Radha Devi Khanna
