= Filmi-ghazal =

Music genre in South Asian cinema

The filmi-ghazal is a genre of music based on ghazal poetry in Hindustani (Hindi-Urdu), used in Indian films, especially the music of Bollywood (Hindi cinema). The filmi-ghazals retain the couplet format and rhyme scheme similar to that in ghazals. However, instead of vocal or instrumental passages as interludes, the filmi-ghazal usually uses precomposed musical pieces.

== History ==
The ghazal tradition of Urdu poetry was the basis for early Bollywood music, ever since the first Indian talkie film, Alam Ara (1931). In turn, filmi ghazals had roots in earlier Urdu Parsi theatre during the 19th to early 20th centuries. The ghazal was the dominant style of Indian film music since the 1930s up until the 1960s. By the 1980s, however, ghazals had become marginalized in film music. Reasons for the decline include Urdu ghazal poetry being gradually phased out from the Indian education system, lyricists targeting urban middle-class audiences, and the influence of Western and Latin American music.

Music directors like Madan Mohan composed notable filmi-ghazals extensively for Muslim socials in the 1960s and the 1970s.

The filmi-ghazal style experienced a revival in the early 1990s, sparked by the success of Nadeem–Shravan's Aashiqui (1990). It had a big impact on Bollywood music, ushering in ghazal-type romantic music that dominated the early 1990s, with soundtracks such as Dil (1990), Saajan (1991), Phool Aur Kaante (1991) and Deewana (1992). However, the filmi ghazal style was once again marginalized by the early 21st century, as filmi songs became faster-paced along with greater Western and Latin influences. However, there have been a number of well-received filmi ghazal songs composed into the 2010s. A popular ghazal song from Aashiqui was "Dheere Dheere", a cover version of which was later recorded by Yo Yo Honey Singh and released by T-Series in 2015.

== See also ==
- Filmi qawwali
