= Ghayal (1990 film) =

1990 Indian film by Rajkumar Santoshi

- Theatrical release poster
- Directed by: Rajkumar Santoshi
- Screenplay by: Rajkumar Santoshi
- Dialogues by: Dilip Shukla
- Story by: Rajkumar Santoshi
- Produced by: Dharmendra
- Starring: Sunny Deol; Meenakshi Seshadri; Amrish Puri; Om Puri; Kulbhushan Kharbanda; Shafi Inamdar; Moushmi Chatterjee; Raj Babbar (special appearance)
- Cinematography: Rajan Kothari
- Edited by: V. N. Mayekar
- Music by: Bappi Lahiri
- Production company: Vijayta Films
- Distributed by: Vijayta Films
- Release date: 22 June 1990
- Running time: 163 minutes
- Country: India
- Language: Hindi
- Budget: ₹2.5 crore
- Box office: ₹20 crore

Ghayal (transl. Wounded) is a 1990 Indian Hindi-language vigilante action film written and directed by Rajkumar Santoshi in his directorial debut and produced by Dharmendra. The film stars Sunny Deol and Meenakshi Seshadri, alongside an ensemble cast of Amrish Puri, Om Puri, Kulbhushan Kharbanda, Shafi Inamdar, Moushumi Chatterjee, Sudesh Berry, Annu Kapoor, and Sharat Saxena.

The film grossed ₹20 crore and was a blockbuster hit at Box Office. It was also the 2nd highest-grossing film of the year. According to Box Office India, "Ghayal had set records in repeat runs. No film from the nineties was even close to it in repeat runs and only Sholay has higher business in repeat runs in the history of Hindi cinema. It grossed several times more than its original run during rereleases but the exact number is unknown."

The film received 8 nominations at the 36th Filmfare Awards, and won a leading 7 awards, including Best Film, Best Director for Santoshi and Best Actor for Deol. At the 38th National Film Awards, the film won the National Film Award for Best Popular Film Providing Wholesome Entertainment and Sunny Deol received the National Film Award – Special Mention. Ghayal was remade in Tamil as Bharathan in 1992, in Telugu as Gamyam in 1998 and in Kannada as Vishwa in 1999 and Pakistani Punjabi as Mard (1991).

On 5 February 2016, a direct sequel titled Ghayal Once Again was released.

== Plot ==
The story centres on Ajay Mehra, a promising amateur boxer, who lives happily with his elder brother, Ashok Mehra, sister-in-law, Indu, and his beautiful girlfriend, Varsha Sahay. Their peaceful life shatters when Ashok, a businessman, goes missing.

Ajay's frantic search for his brother leads to a shocking discovery: Ashok had been entrapped by the ruthless and powerful industrialist, Balwant Rai. Rai had used Ashok’s company as a front for his illegal activities. When Ashok resisted and gathered incriminating evidence against him, Rai had him kidnapped and tortured. Upon learning that Ajay also possessed knowledge of the evidence, Balwant Rai murders Ashok.

Rai orchestrates a sinister plot, framing Ajay for his brother's murder. During the ensuing, heavily manipulated court trial, Ajay's own defence counsel, Pramod Sharan Gupta, having been purchased by Balwant Rai, falsely implicates him in the murder of his brother and maliciously smears his reputation by alleging an illicit relationship with his sister-in-law, Indu. Betrayed by the legal system and witnessing the immense power of his tormentor, Ajay’s faith in justice is completely destroyed. The trauma and public disgrace drive his sister-in-law, Indu, to tragically commit suicide.

While imprisoned, Ajay makes friends with a group of convicts who are essentially good at heart, but have turned to crime due to desperate circumstances. Realizing the law will never deliver justice for him or his deceased family, Ajay and his friends execute a daring prison break. Police Commissioner Ashok Pradhan assigns ACP Joe D'Souza, an honest police officer, to pursue Ajay, who is now a fugitive.

Ajay, aided by Varsha, embarks on a relentless mission for retribution. He systematically dismantles Balwant Rai's criminal network, targeting the men who framed him one by one. The film culminates in a dramatic showdown where Balwant Rai kidnaps Varsha, drawing Ajay into a final confrontation. Ajay rescues Varsha and chases Rai to an amusement park. Despite the intervention of the police, Ajay’s intense rage and desire for ultimate justice override his compliance. In a final act of poetic revenge, Varsha covertly slips Ajay a gun, which he uses to fatally shoot Balwant Rai in front of the police and a crowd of witnesses. The film concludes with Ajay being arrested, having exacted his own form of justice and accepting the consequences, cementing his transformation from an ordinary man to a wounded vigilante.

== Cast ==
- Sunny Deol as Ajay Mehra
- Meenakshi Seshadri as Varsha Sahay – Ajay's girlfriend and fiancée
- Amrish Puri as Balwant Rai
- Om Puri as ACP Joe D'Souza
- Kulbhushan Kharbanda as Police Commissioner Ashok Pradhan
- Shafi Inamdar as Barrister Pramod Sharan Gupta
- Moushumi Chatterjee as Indu Mehra – Ashok's wife, Ajay's sister-in-law
- Raj Babbar (special appearance) as Ashok Mehra – Ajay's elder brother
- Sudesh Berry as Rajan Berry
- Annu Kapoor as Ashok's friend
- Sharat Saxena as Captain Dekka
- Deep Dhillon as Inspector Pratap Sharma
- Shabbir Khan as Vardha Rajan
- Gurmeet Mitwa as Mitwa
- Ashalata Wabgaonkar as Ashok Pradhan's wife
- Viju Khote as Boxing Coach
- Mahabir Bhullar as Kamran
- Jack Gaud as Inspector Basheer Khan
- Mukesh Rishi as Decca’s henchman
- Brahmachari as Mohile
- Praveen Kumar as Bheem (cameo)
- Disco Shanti as dancer in the song "Pyasi Jawani Hai"
- Kartar Sangha (uncredited) as the man betting on Ajay in boxing fight

== Production ==
Rajkumar Santoshi initially wanted to make the film with Kamal Haasan in the lead role, but was hesitant as the actor's previous Hindi films did not perform well. Then he subsequently approached Mithun Chakraborty for the role, who nodded to it and advised the former to make the film bilingually in Bengali and Hindi. Dharmendra proposed to Santoshi to make the film with Sunny Deol, and requested Chakraborty to leave the project.

In an unsubstantiated claim, Pakistani screenwriter Nasir Adeeb stated that he wrote the original story for Ghayal at the insistence of its producer, Dharmendra, who had previously remade some of Adeeb’s films.

== Music ==
The music was composed by Bappi Lahiri. The lyrics of the songs were penned by Anjaan and Indeevar.

A woeful version of the song is "Saath Hain Hum Sab Isse Badi Kya Khushi", sung independently and sedately by Kumar Sanu. Another song, "Mungda" rendered tersely in the film, originally occurs in the 1977 film Inkaar. Anjaan wrote all the songs except two versions of "Sochna Kya", which were penned by Indeevar. "Sochna Kya" was cover version of song Lambada by Kaoma from album Worldbeat, which was itself based on Llorando se fue by Los Kjarkas.

Song	Singer
"Mahiya" (Sad)	Lata Mangeshkar
"Mahiya" (Happy)	Lata Mangeshkar, Pankaj Udhas
"Sochna Kya" (Happy)	Asha Bhosle, Shabbir Kumar, Kumar Sanu
"Sochna Kya" (Sad)	Kumar Sanu
"Don't Say No"	Amit Kumar, S. Janaki
"Pyasi Jawani"	S. Janaki

== Awards ==
38th National Film Awards:

- Best Popular Film Providing Wholesome Entertainment – Dharmendra
- National Film Award – Special Jury Award – Sunny Deol

36th Filmfare Awards:

Won

- Best Film – Dharmendra
- Best Director – Rajkumar Santoshi
- Best Actor – Sunny Deol
- Best Story – Rajkumar Santoshi
- Best Art Director – Nitish Roy
- Best Cinematographer – Rajan Kothari
- Best Editor – V. N. Mayekar

Nominated

- Best Supporting Actor – Om Puri

== Remakes ==
Below is a table of the lead characters in the story of Ghayal and its remakes.

Movie	Language	Hero	Heroine	Hero's Brother	Sister In Law	Villain	Ref.
Ghayal (1990)	Hindi	Sunny Deol	Meenakshi Seshadri	Raj Babbar	Moushumi Chatterjee	Amrish Puri	
Bharathan (1992)	Tamil	Vijayakanth	Bhanupriya	S. P. Balasubrahmanyam	Sumithra	Anandaraj	
Gamyam (1998)	Telugu	Srikanth	Ravali	Sarath Babu	Geetha	Kota Srinivasa Rao	
Vishwa (1999)	Kannada	Shiva Rajkumar	Suchitra Krishnamoorthi	Anant Nag	Suhasini Maniratnam	Satya Prakash	

== Sequel ==
A sequel named Ghayal Returns was announced in 2014. But before the film could enter production, it faced financial problems. However, Sunny Deol stated that he was determined to make the film. After once being stalled and then being postponed several times, the film was finally released with the title, Ghayal: Once Again, on 5 February 2016.
