= Yeh Duniyan Gazab Ki =

Indian sitcom series

- Genre: Sitcom
- Written by: Sharad Joshi
- Directed by: Raman Kumar
- Starring: See below
- Opening theme: "Yeh Duniyan Gazab Ki" by Udit Narayan and Kumar Sanu

Production
- Production company: Oberoi Films

Original release
- Network: Doordarshan

Yeh Duniya Ghazab Ki (transl. This world is strange) is a sitcom aired on Doordarshan in early 1990s.

Dialogues of the show were written by acclaimed writer Sharad Joshi, direction was by Raman Kumar and production was by Oberoi Films. Title song of the show was sung by Kumar Sanu and Udit Narayan

== Plot ==
Yeh Duniya Ghazab Ki is a satirical comedy which exposes the red tape in Indian government and the delusion of a common man. Nihaal (Rakesh Bedi) a simpleton from a small town comes to city, with an aspiration of reaping a reward from the government for his good work. He is supported by good Samaritans, however, in the crowd of contemporary cosmopolitan culture, he encounters, for the first time in his life, the complexities of the inevitable red tape. He is enmeshed in a duel of egoistic duplicity. Nihaal eventually returns to his rural roots after being used comprehensively by government officials.

== Cast ==
- Rakesh Bedi as Nihal
- Rajesh Puri
- Swaroop Sampat
- Neha Sharad
- Tiku Talsania as Maharaja
- Shail Chaturvedi
- Achyut Potdar
- Satish Shah
