= Janam Kundli =

- Theatrical release poster
- Directed by: Tariq Shah
- Written by: Talat Rekhi
- Produced by: Ibrahim Khan; Hiralal N. Patel
- Starring: Jeetendra; Vinod Khanna; Reena Roy; Anu Aggarwal
- Cinematography: H. Laxmi Narayan
- Edited by: Prashanth Khedekar; Vinod Nayak
- Music by: Anand–Milind
- Production company: Uma Productions
- Release date: 12 May 1995
- Running time: 158 minutes
- Country: India
- Language: Hindi

Janam Kundli (transl. Birth Chart) is a 1995 Hindi-language action-drama film directed by Tariq Shah and produced by Ibrahim Khan, Hiralal N. Patel under the Uma Productions banner and it stars Jeetendra, Vinod Khanna, Reena Roy, Anu Aggarwal in the pivotal roles and music composed by Anand–Milind.

== Cast ==
- Jeetendra as Ravi Kapoor
- Vinod Khanna as Randhir Mehra / Junior
- Reena Roy as Rita R Mehra, Randhir's wife
- Anu Aggarwal as Kiran M Prasad / Kiran R Kapoor
- Paresh Rawal as Wong Lee / Ching Lee /Double Role
- Anupam Kher as Mahendra Prasad
- Harish as Sunny R Kapoor, Ravi and Kiran's son
- Sunil Lahiri as Ashwini R Mehra, Randhir's son
- Sakshi Sivanand as Madhu Sodhi
- Satish Kaul as Rajiv Sodhi
- Anant Mahadevan as Pandit Dindayal Shastri
- Chandrashekhar Vaidya as Surinder Mehra, Randhir's uncle
- Kanwarjit Paintal as Ravi's friend
- Dinesh Hingoo as DH
- Brij Gopal as Brij Mehra

== Soundtrack ==
Song	Singer
"Love Love Love"	Udit Narayan, Sadhana Sargam
"Pyar Ho Gaya"	Udit Narayan, Alka Yagnik
"Agar Barsaat"	Kumar Sanu, Poornima
"Dil Deewana"	Abhijeet, Poornima
"Cham Cham"	Arun Bakshi, Poornima
"Lalla Tera Ghar"	Arun Bakshi, Sudesh Bhosle
