= Jeene Do =

- Poster
- Directed by: Rajesh Sethi
- Written by: Shyam Goel
- Starring: Sanjay Dutt; Jackie Shroff; Farah; Sonam
- Cinematography: Manmohan Singh
- Edited by: Naresh Malhotra
- Music by: R. D. Burman
- Production company: Arjun Arts
- Release date: 9 March 1990
- Country: India
- Language: Hindi

Jeene Do (transl. Let Live) is a 1990 Indian Hindi-language action drama film directed by Rajesh Sethi. It stars Anupam Kher, Sanjay Dutt, Jackie Shroff, and Farah, Sonam. The film was a tribute to Mujhe Jeene Do.

== Cast ==
- Sanjay Dutt as Karamveer
- Jackie Shroff as Suraj
- Farah as Chanda
- Sonam as Sujata
- Kulbhushan Kharbanda as Rehmat
- Shakti Kapoor as Inspector Himmat Singh
- Anupam Kher as Hardayal
- Amrish Puri as Thakur Sher Bahadur Singh
- Beena Banerjee as Krishna
- Jagdish Raj as Sujata's Father
- Aparajita Mohanty as Sujata's Mother

== Soundtrack ==
The music for the film was composed by R. D. Burman, with lyrics by Anand Bakshi.

Song	Singer
"Mere Raja Tu So Ja"	Lata Mangeshkar
"Seene Mein Sholay" – 1	Mohammed Aziz
"Seene Mein Sholay" – 2	Mohammed Aziz
"Shahar Shahar, Dagar Dagar, Gali Gali Mein"	Mohammed Aziz, Amit Kumar
"Boliya Oye Boliya, Aaja Raja, Chori Chori Khelen Aankh-Micholiya"	Asha Bhosle, Amit Kumar, Suresh Wadkar
"Sari Raat Guzari Maine Dekhke Chand Ki Bindiya"	Asha Bhosle, Babla Mehta
