= Ghazab Tamasha =

Gajab Tamaasa
- Directed by: Ranjeet
- Produced by: Ranjeet
- Starring: Rahul Roy; Anu Aggarwal; Deepak Tijori; Aruna Irani; Tanuja; Kulbhushan Kharbanda; Ranjeet
- Music by: Anand–Milind
- Release date: 1 May 1992
- Running time: 144 minutes
- Country: India
- Language: Hindi

Gajab Tamaasa is a 1992 family-drama-romantic film, produced and directed by Ranjeet. It has Rahul Roy, Anu Aggarwal in the lead roles.

== Plot ==
Struggling through predator eyes, a poor destitute girl Ganga (Anu Aggarwal) meets Seetaram (Rahul Roy). They work as servants in two different families, and help the two families fall in love, as do they themselves.

== Cast ==
- Rahul Roy as Seetaram
- Anu Aggarwal as Ganga
- Deepak Tijori
- Aruna Irani
- Tanuja
- Kulbhushan Kharbanda
- Satyen Kappu
- Satyajeet Puri
- Guddi Maruti
- Sneha
- Ranjeet

== Soundtrack ==
#	Song	Singer
1.	"Bhooki Bhikaran Hoon Main"	Kavita Krishnamurthy
2.	"Chunri Pyar Ki Udi"	Kumar Sanu, Kavita Krishnamurthy
3.	"Deewana Deewana"	Kumar Sanu, Kavita Krishnamurthy
4.	"Duniya Toh Yaar Hai Ghazab"	Kumar Sanu
5.	"Duniya Toh Yaar Hai Ghazab" (Sad)	Kumar Sanu
6.	"Ladki Gali Ki"	Kavita Krishnamurthy
7.	"Peeke Shiva Shankar Ka Pyala"	Kumar Sanu, Sadhana Sargam
