= Dil Hai Ke Manta Nahin =

1991 film by Mahesh Bhatt

- Poster of Dil Hai Ke Manta Nahin
- Directed by: Mahesh Bhatt
- Written by: Robin Bhatt; Sharad Joshi
- Based on: It Happened One Night (1934) & Chori Chori (1956)
- Produced by: Gulshan Kumar; Mukesh Bhatt
- Starring: Aamir Khan; Pooja Bhatt; Anupam Kher; Tiku Talsania
- Cinematography: Pravin Bhatt
- Edited by: Shakti Himachali & Raju Baddi
- Music by: Nadeem-Shravan
- Production companies: T-Series; Vishesh Films
- Distributed by: Spark Worldwide (US), (DVD)
- Release date: 12 July 1991
- Country: India
- Language: Hindi
- Box office: ₹42 million

Dil Hai Ke Manta Nahin (transl. The heart is such, it disagrees) is a 1991 Indian Hindi-language romantic comedy film produced by Gulshan Kumar and Mukesh Bhatt and directed by Mahesh Bhatt. The film starred Bhatt's daughter Pooja Bhatt in her first major lead female role, with Aamir Khan starring as her love interest. Supporting roles were played by Anupam Kher, Sameer Chitre, and Tiku Talsania, while Deepak Tijori made a special appearance.

The plot of Dil Hai Ke Manta Nahin was inspired from the 1934 Hollywood film It Happened One Night starring Clark Gable and Claudette Colbert. In turn, Dil Hai Ke Manta Nahin was remade in Telugu as Kurradi Kurrodu (1994) and in Tamil as Kadhal Rojavae (2000). The Kannada film Hudugaata (2007) was also inspired by the same American film.

Dil Hai Ke Manta Nahin emerged as a box office success and boosted the career of newcomer Pooja Bhatt, while cementing Aamir Khan's status as a leading movie star. The film's soundtrack, with music by Nadeem–Shravan, was also praised.

At the 37th Filmfare Awards, Dil Hai Ke Manta Nahin received 6 nominations, including Best Film, Best Director (Mahesh Bhatt) and Best Actor (Khan), and won Best Female Playback Singer (Anuradha Paudwal for "Dil Hai Ki Manta Nahin")

== Plot ==
Pooja Dharamchand is the daughter of a wealthy Bombay shipping tycoon, Seth Dharamchand. She is head over heels in love with film star Deepak Kumar, but her father strongly disapproves of their relationship. One night, Pooja escapes from her father's yacht and boards a bus to Bangalore to be with Deepak, who is shooting a film there. Realising that his daughter has run away, Seth Dharamchand offers a reward to anyone who can find her.

Aboard the bus, Pooja meets Raghu Jaitley, a loud-mouthed journalist who has just lost his job. He offers to help her in exchange for an exclusive story about her, which would revive his flagging career. Pooja is forced to agree to his demands, as he threatens to inform her father of her whereabouts if she refuses. After they accidentally miss the bus, Raghu and Pooja go through a series of adventures together and eventually fall in love.

Raghu wishes to marry Pooja, but knows that he is not financially secure enough to do so. He temporarily leaves her, intending to ask his boss for money so that he can propose to her. Pooja also falls in love with Raghu and decides to be with him, but she misses his note and believes that he has abandoned her.

Disheartened, she returns home and prepares to marry Deepak. Her father learns about Raghu when he approaches Seth Dharamchand to ask for reimbursement for the money he spent trying to get Pooja to Bangalore. Seth Dharamchand realises that Raghu looked after Pooja during the journey and asks whether he is in love with her. Raghu admits that he is. Pooja is initially angry, believing that Raghu has come to claim the reward money. However, her father reveals the true purpose of Raghu's visit and tells her that Raghu genuinely loves her. With her father's support, Pooja runs away from the wedding hall to reunite with Raghu.

== Cast ==
- Aamir Khan - Raghu Jaitley
- Pooja Bhatt - Pooja Dharamchand
- Anupam Kher - Seth Dharamchand
- Tiku Talsania - Sharmaji, editor of the Daily Toofan newspaper and Raghu's boss
- Rakesh Bedi, Veerendra Saxena - Private Detectives Bhagwat and Kaushik
- Sameer Chitre - Deepak Kumar
- Deepak Tijori, Roma Manek - Special appearances in the song "Galyat Saakli Sonyachi"
- Rajesh Puri - Seth Dharamchand's P. A.
- Mushtaq Khan - Bus Conductor
- Javed Khan Amrohi - Purse Snatcher
- Avtaar Gill - Kidnapper
- Shammi - Parsi Lady
- Ghanshyam Rohera - Tempo Driver
- Dinyar Tirandaz - Parsi Guest House Owner
- Shobha Khote, Amrit Patel - Inn Managers
- Shehnaz Kudia - Anna, secretary at the Daily Toofan office

== Awards ==
37th Filmfare Awards:

Won

- Best Female Playback Singer – Anuradha Paudwal for "Dil Hai Ke Manta Nahin"

Nominated

- Best Film – Mukesh Bhatt and Gulshan Kumar
- Best Director – Mahesh Bhatt
- Best Actor – Aamir Khan
- Best Comedian – Anupam Kher
- Best Lyricist – Faaiz Anwar for "Dil Hai Ke Manta Nahin"

== Soundtrack ==
Dil Hai Ke Manta Nahin

Soundtrack album by Nadeem Shravan
- Released: June 13, 1991
- Recorded: 1991
- Studio: Sudeep Studio Pvt. Ltd.
- Genre: Film soundtrack
- Length: 56:53
- Language: Hindi
- Label: T-Series
- Director: Nadeem Shravan
- Producer: Gulshan Kumar

Nadeem Shravan chronology
Aap Ki Yaadein (1991)	Dil Hai Ke Manta Nahin (1991)	Saajan (1991)

The soundtrack of the film is composed by the music director duo Nadeem-Shravan. The song lyrics were written by Sameer, Faaiz Anwar, Rani Malik and Aziz Khan. All the songs are sung by Anuradha Paudwal, along with co-singers Kumar Sanu, Abhijeet, Babla Mehta and Debashish Dasgupta. On first release of audio, all the songs were originally voiced by Babla Mehta, but later was released with Kumar Sanu replacing Mehta, except "Galyat Sankali Sonyachi" sung by Mehta and "Dil Tujhpe Aa Gaya" sung by Abhijeet. The album became very popular in India with tracks like the title track and "Tu Pyaar Hai Kisi Aur Ka" (based on the Saleem Kausar ghazal "Main khayal hoon kisi aur ka") being very successful in the '90s, and are popular to date. According to the Indian trade website Box Office India, with around 2,500,000 units sold the soundtrack became the fifth highest-selling album of the year.

#	Title	Singer(s)	Lyricist	Raga
1.	"Dil Hai Ki Manta Nahin" (Female)	Anuradha Paudwal	Faaiz Anwar	
2.	"O Mere Sapnon Ke Saudagar"	Anuradha Paudwal	Sameer	
3.	"Adayein Bhi Hain Mohabbat Bhi Hai"	Anuradha Paudwal, Kumar Sanu	Sameer	
4.	"Tu Pyar Hai Kisi Aur Ka"	Anuradha Paudwal, Kumar Sanu	Sameer	
5.	"Mainu Ishq Da Lagya Rog"	Anuradha Paudwal	Sameer	Pilu
6.	"Dil Tujhpe Aa Gaya"	Anuradha Paudwal, Abhijeet	Sameer	
7.	"Dil Hai Ki Manta Nahin"	Anuradha Paudwal, Kumar Sanu	Faaiz Anwar	
8.	"Dulhan Tu Dulha Main"	Anuradha Paudwal, Debashish Dasgupta	Aziz Khan	
9.	"Galyat Sankali Sonyachi"	Anuradha Paudwal, Babla Mehta	Sameer	
10.	"Hum To Mashhor Hue Hain"	Anuradha Paudwal	Rani Malik	
11.	"Kaise Mizaj Aap Ke Hain"	Anuradha Paudwal, Kumar Sanu	Faaiz Anwar	
12.	"Dil Hai Ki Manta Nahin"	(Instrumental)	Faaiz Anwar	
