= Neha Sharad =

Indian television actress

- Born: Neha Joshi; Bhopal, Madhya Pradesh, India
- Occupation: Actress
- Spouse: Bhushan Jeevan (died 1997)
- Relatives: Sharad Joshi (father); Irfana Siddiqui (mother)

Neha Sharad is an Indian television actor and poet. She has worked in TV shows, including Tara, Waqt ki Raftar, Mamta, Gumraah, Yeh Duniya Ghazab Ki and Farmaan.

== Life ==
Neha was born as Neha Joshi in Bhopal and grew up in Bombay. She is the daughter of writer Padma Shri awardee Sharad Joshi and theatre artist Irfana Siddiqui. She was involved in the 2009 TV series, Lapataganj, as a creative head, as the initial episodes were based on her father's works.

She has organized literary festivals, such as Sharadotsav, to commemorate her father's works.
