= Khal-Naaikaa =

1993 film

- Theatrical release poster
- Directed by: Saawan Kumar Tak
- Written by: Kamleshwar (dialogues)
- Screenplay by: Sachin Bhowmick
- Story by: Bharat B. Bhalla
- Produced by: Saawan Kumar Tak
- Starring: Jeetendra; Jaya Prada; Anu Aggarwal
- Cinematography: Nadeem Khan
- Edited by: Jawahar Razdan
- Music by: Mahesh - Kishore
- Production company: Saawan Kumar Productions
- Release date: 6 August 1993
- Running time: 157 minutes
- Country: India
- Language: Hindi

Khal-Naaikaa (transl. "Lady Villain" or "The Vamp") is a 1993 Indian Hindi-language thriller film, produced and directed by Saawan Kumar under the Saawan Kumar Productions banner. It stars Jeetendra, Jaya Prada, Anu Aggarwal and music composed by Mahesh - Kishore. It is based on the 1992 Hollywood film The Hand That Rocks the Cradle.

== Plot ==
Homemaker Jaya Kapoor is happily married and lives with her husband Ravi Kapoor and two children, a girl, Sahiba, and a baby boy, Munna. While being examined at a check-up, she becomes a target of Dr. Rajan Bakshi, who previously molested four other ladies. Although she escapes from the check-up, she feels bad and comes home. Traumatised, she tells Ravi, who later encourages her to report Dr. Bakshi to the medical board. Her initial accusation, with the help of their journalist friend Varsha Sharma, the four women come forward about Dr. Bakshi assaulting them, and multiple charges are filed against him. Dr. Bakshi commits suicide to avoid being arrested. All of Rajan's staff members console while one of them swears at Jaya for doing such work. While sharing her experience with Bakshi's pregnant widow, Anuradha, who was stressed about her husband's suicide, falls unconscious, goes into pre-term labour, and loses her baby. While recovering in the hospital, she sees a news story identifying Jaya as the one who reported her husband. Unaware of her husband's misdemeanour, she blames Jaya for wrecking their happy married life and swears revenge.

Months later, Jaya looks for a nanny, and she unknowingly hires Anuradha, who is going under the alias "Kiran". Anuradha wages a campaign to undermine Jaya in her household. She initially tries to kill Munna but cancels it, and frequently breastfeeds him in secret; this causes him to reject Jaya, as he stops taking her milk. Gangaram, an intellectually disabled gardener who has been assisting the Kapoors and is friendly with Sahiba, hated her for being rude to him. One day, when Jaya was going to attend a party, Anuradha ruins one of Jaya's dresses, letting Jaya wear something else instead, even telling Anuradha to send it to the dry cleaning service. Anuradha later destroys the dress and dumps it away, also replacing the dress with another, and sending it to the dry cleaning service.

One day, Gangaram discovers Anuradha breastfeeding Munna; Anuradha confronts him, slaps him multiple times, and concludes that she'll prove him wrong. He secretly tries to tell them about her act, but discovers Kiran's presence, so he tells them through some ruses. To prevent him from exposing her, Anuradha plants nude pictures of Jaya in Gangaram's living quarters, which leads Ravi to beat him up and fire him. Unknown to the family, except for Sahiba, Gangaram keeps a watchful eye over them. Anuradha encourages Jaya's daughter, Sahiba, to keep secrets from her mother and tries to turn her against Jaya.

Anuradha also talks with Jaya regarding their and Munna's birth signs and suggests many things regarding some people's traits, thus getting an idea. Anuradha also suggests to Ravi that he arrange a surprise party for Jaya, leading Varsha and Ravi to meet in secret in a jewellery shop to select a necklace. Because of her misunderstandings, Jaya's birthday gets ruined, despite Ravi and Varsha's surprise; thus, Anuradha succeeds here. Jaya accuses Ravi of having an affair with Varsha, and this leads to tension between the couple. A now wary Jaya begins to suspect "Kiran's" hand in all of the recent incidents and suggests to Ravi that they should get rid of her. Anuradha overhears their conversation, and the next morning, she boobytraps the greenhouse for Jaya, having learnt about its glass ceiling. Jaya goes to bring new plants from the nursery, disappointing Anuradha for a while.

Meanwhile, Varsha discovers Anuradha's identity through a newspaper depicting Anuradha's marriage, but before she can get in touch with Jaya, Anuradha tricks her into going into the greenhouse, where she is killed by the falling glass ceiling. Knowing that Jaya has asthma, Anuradha empties all of Jaya's inhalers and takes Munna out for a walk. When Jaya arrives back home and finds Varsha's bloodied, glass-covered body, she has an asthma attack and is briefly hospitalised. Ravi is left distraught over both Varsha's death and his wife's condition. Seeing Ravi leave, Gangaram tries to prove his innocence and even tells what Anuradha did. Anuradha attempts to seduce him, but he imagines Jaya and tells her feelings to Anuradha (as thought by Ravi). It is stopped when Sahiba calls her father, and he gets up. She thinks her plan worked (but it fails).

While Gangaram tells the rest of the deeds done by Anuradha and proves his innocence, Jaya starts hating Anuradha, doubts why Varsha came to her home, and what the reason was. Eventually, Jaya uncovers the truth, confronts her, and reveals it to Ravi. Anuradha reveals that she was the reason behind Gangaram's ouster, the fake suspicions against Varsha and Ravi, and the trap made for Jaya (which almost failed), and claims that she and Ravi are having an affair. Ravi denies this claim and kicks her out, claiming he said those words for Jaya. Sethia tells Jaya and Ravi to call the police, and when Jaya goes to call, Anuradha picks up a knife to kill Jaya; after that, she snatches Munna and starts blackmailing Ravi and Jaya. Sethia almost catches her from behind, but she manages to escape. Ravi calls the cops, and the Kapoor house is placed under protection.

Anuradha breaks into the house, killing the guard and their friend Sethia, and lures Ravi down to the basement, where she hits him on the head, knocking him down the stairs and injuring his legs badly. Jaya also discovers it through Ravi, thus telling the children to stay where they are, and tries to call someone. Anuradha attempts to take Sahiba and Munna, but after seeing Anuradha assault her mother, Sahiba locks Anuradha in the nursery. Anuradha escapes by breaking the door with a gardening pole and hears Munna in the treehouse. She enters and sees Gangaram aiding the kids' escape. When Jaya enters with a knife, Anuradha attempts to kill her but knocks her down after Jaya appears to be having another asthma attack, prompting Anuradha to mock her. As Anuradha tries to take Munna and beats Gangaram, Jaya gets back up, having faked her asthma attack, and beats Anuradha continuously, although she defends herself. Anuradha, still resolute, resorts to strangling Gangaram; Jaya finally takes back the knife, stabs Anuradha twice, and pushes her out of the treehouse, killing her.

Touched by how Gangaram risked his life to protect her family, Jaya welcomes him back into their lives. Jaya, Ravi, and their children lived happily ever after.

== Cast ==
- Jeetendra as Ravi Kapoor
- Jayapradha as Jaya Ravi Kapoor
- Anu Aggarwal as Anuradha Rajan Bakshi / Kiran
- Mehmood as Gangaram
- Puneet Issar as Dr. Rajan Bakshi
- Varsha Usgaonkar as Varsha Sharma
- Sahebzadi Kohli as Sahiba Kapoor, Ravi, and Jaya's daughter
- Zain Ansari as Munna Kapoor, Ravi, and Jaya's son
- Bharat Bhalla as Hanuman Sethia
- Prachi Save Saathi as a girl in the song "Mere Achchhe Chanda Mama"

== Soundtrack ==
#	Title	Singer(s)
1	"Kisi Ki Premika Banke"	Sadhana Sargam, Kavita Krishnamurthy
2	"Dost Bewafaa Hai"	Sadhana Sargam
3	"Choli Ke Andar Kya Hai"	Vipin Sachdeva, Poornima
4	"Mere Mehboob Se Militi Hai"	Kavita Krishnamurthy
5	"Mere Achchhe Chanda Mama"	Sadhana Sargam
6	"Doosron Ki Burai"	Sadhana Sargam, Vipin Sachdeva

== Release ==
The film was released on the same day as the Subhash Ghai-directorial Khal Nayak. Before Khal-Naaikaa's release, Ghai raised objections against the film's release at the Indian Motion Picture Producers' Association (IMPPA), due to its clash with his film's release date and a similar title, but his effort yielded a futile result, as the guild gave the verdict against him, stating, while Ghai could alter his film's release date, the producers of Khal-Naaikaa were not required to change theirs. Consequently, both films were released on 6 August 1993.

== See also ==
- The Hand That Rocks the Cradle
