= Return of Jewel Thief =

- Film poster
- Directed by: Ashok Tyagi
- Written by: Ranbir Pushp; Sanjay Nirupam
- Produced by: T.P. Aggarwal
- Starring: Ashok Kumar; Dev Anand; Dharmendra; Jackie Shroff; Shilpa Shirodkar; Anu Aggarwal; Madhoo
- Cinematography: Kamalakar Rao
- Music by: Jatin–Lalit
- Release date: 18 October 1996
- Running time: 155 minutes
- Country: India
- Language: Hindi
- Budget: ₹35 million
- Box office: ₹52.5 million

Return of Jewel Thief is a 1996 Indian Hindi-language crime action thriller film directed by Ashok Tyagi. It is a sequel to the 1967 film Jewel Thief, that starred Ashok Kumar and Dev Anand who reprise their roles in this film. The cast of the film also includes Dharmendra, Jackie Shroff, Shilpa Shirodkar, Anu Aggarwal and Madhoo. Unlike the predecessor, this film was a box office failure. This was the last release of Aggarwal.

== Plot ==
The British Government agrees to lend the priceless Kohinoor diamond for an exhibition to multi-billionaire Vinay Kumar on the condition that he deposits his jewel collection worth 500 billion rupees as security. Despite top-level protection the Kohinoor is stolen. Suspicion quickly falls on Vinay himself as his entire jewel collection posted as collateral also disappears. Police Commissioner Surya Dev Singh the last known person to have handled the diamond and son of Prince Arjun the infamous jewel thief from the original film is also under scrutiny. Con-man Johnny notorious for his jewel heists becomes another suspect alongside Jukaso a gangster of international repute. Even Chief Minister Neelkanth who had placed the Kohinoor in his personal safe in the presence of Surya Dev Singh is not above suspicion. With both the Chief Minister and the Police Commissioner implicated the mystery deepens and no one truly knows who the real criminal is.

== Cast ==
- Ashok Kumar as Prince Arjun
- Dev Anand as Vinay Kumar / Prince Amar
- Dharmendra as Police Commissioner Surya Dev Singh
- Jackie Shroff as Jatin Kumar 'Johnny'
- Shilpa Shirodkar as Sonu
- Anu Aggarwal as Princess Vishaka
- Madhoo as Madhoo
- Prem Chopra as Minister Neelkanth
- Sadashiv Amrapurkar as Jukaso
- Hemant Choudhary as Police Officer

== Soundtrack ==
The soundtrack and background score were composed by Jatin–Lalit and all the lyrics were penned by Anand Bakshi.

#	Title	Singer(s)
1	"Aa Meri Janam"	Abhijeet, Alka Yagnik
2	"Shaher Mein Shor"	Asha Bhosle
3	"Chehra Haseen Hai"	Udit Narayan, Kavita Krishnamurthy
4	"Aaj Ka Din"	Kumar Sanu, Abhijeet
5	"Jug Magati Hai"	Kumar Sanu, Mohammed Aziz, Bali Brahmbhatt, Alka Yagnik & Vijeta Pandit
6	"O Jaan Jaan Jaani"	Vinod Rathod, Asha Bhosle
7	"Aaja Re Aaja Sajna"	Alka Yagnik
8	"Shaher Mein Shor"	Sudesh Bhosle
