= The Cloud Door =

- Title card
- Directed by: Mani Kaul
- Screenplay by: Mani Kaul
- Based on: Avimaraka by Bhāsa; Padmavat by Mohammed Jayasi
- Produced by: Regina Ziegler; Lalitha Krishna
- Starring: Anu Aggarwal; Murad Ali; Rohit Raj
- Cinematography: Anil Mehta
- Edited by: Lalitha Krishna
- Music by: Ustad Zia Fariddudin Dagar
- Release date: 28 September 1994 (New York Film Festival)
- Running time: 29 minutes
- Countries: Germany; India
- Language: Hindi

The Cloud Door (Hindi: बादल द्वार, German: Die Himmelspforte) is a 1994 short Indo-German drama film, directed by acclaimed Indian director Mani Kaul and featuring Hindu erotic literary themes. The film was produced by the German producer Regina Ziegler. The Cloud Door was featured along with other short films such as Susan Seidelman's The Dutch Master and Ken Russell's The Insatiable Mrs. Kirsch, as a part of Ziegler Films' compilation of short erotic films called Erotic Tales.

Mani Kaul drew upon three literary sources for it: the Sanskrit play Avimaraka, written by Bhāsa around 5th-7th century; the Sufi epic love poem Padmavat, written by Mohammed Jayasi in the 13th century; and the erotic Indian tales Śukasaptati.

== Plot ==
An Indian king overhears a parrot telling erotic stories to his daughter. Enraged, he wishes to kill the parrot. The princess intervenes and saves the parrot's life by explaining to her father that the bird does not know what it is saying. In gratitude, the bird flies to the princess's lover and leads him through a labyrinth to the princess's private chambers. The princess and the lover spend the night making love.

== Reception ==
In January 1995, The Cloud Door was screened once for the public at the International Film Festival of India in Mumbai as part of the Erotic Tales program. Kaul, known for his aesthetic work, had never previously made an Indian erotic film, despite the country's rich history of erotic folk art and literature. The single-screening of the film caused an uproar due to its erotic nature and on-screen nudity, and resulted in the police being called in to prevent rioting. An extra screening, exclusively for the press, was held later at a different venue. The film was also screened at the Munich Film Festival, Locarno International Film Festival, New York Film Festival and the Robert Flaherty Film Seminar.

Variety reviewer Todd McCarty said the film "features pictorial beauty, slow-building sensuality and surprising humor that combine to rich effect". The reviewer for the New York Times said that the film, when viewed with subtitles and deprived of its cultural context of Muslim and Hindu literature, "becomes a succession of brightly colored images that almost tell a story: a beautiful woman, perhaps a courtesan; a green, long-tailed parrot who repeats the erotic phrases he's picked up in her room; potential lovers; a fish that laughs". Another review observed that The Cloud Door has plenty of humorous and sensual imagery and flows like a folk tale. Beautiful nothingness perhaps, but still nothingness. Certainly, the actors here are very attractive, and the costumes and sets are gorgeous, but the story has very few memorable moments to make this film memorable.
