= Anil Mehta =

Indian cinematographer

- Born: India
- Education: FTII
- Occupations: Cinematographer; film director; screenwriter

Anil Mehta ISC is an Indian cinematographer, film director and writer who predominantly works in Hindi cinema. He is one of the founding members of the Indian Society of Cinematographers (ISC).

== Early life and education ==
Anil studied cinematography at the Film and Television Institute of India, Pune in 1986.

== Career ==
Anil initially assisted director Ketan Mehta and cinematographer Jehangir Choudhary on Holi (1984) and Mirch Masala (1987), while he was a student and went on to assist Barun Mukherjee on television commercials.

He debuted as a cinematographer on a short Indo-German drama film, The Cloud Door (1994). His first full-length film was Khamoshi: The Musical (1996), which was also Sanjay Leela Bhansali's directorial debut.

In 1999, he won the National Film Award for Best Cinematography for his work in Hum Dil De Chuke Sanam (1999) and later worked in Lagaan (2001), which was one of the most expensive Indian films at that time.

=== Early 2000s and present ===
He also worked on Kal Ho Naa Ho (2003), Veer-Zaara (2004), Kabhi Alvida Naa Kehna (2006), Wake Up Sid (2009), Rockstar (2011), Cocktail (2012), Highway (2014) and Ae Dil Hai Mushkil (2016).

Mehta's first feature film, Aaja Nachle, was produced by Yash Raj Films which released on 30 November 2007. the film stars Madhuri Dixit (her comeback film), Konkona Sen Sharma, Akshaye Khanna and Kunal Kapoor.

== Filmography ==
=== As cinematographer ===
Year	Film	Language	Notes
1994	The Cloud Door	Hindi	Short film
1996	Khamoshi: The Musical	Hindi	
1999	Hum Dil De Chuke Sanam	Hindi	
2001	Lagaan	Hindi	
2002	Agni Varsha	Hindi	
2002	Saathiya	Hindi	
2003	Kal Ho Naa Ho	Hindi	
2004	Veer-Zaara	Hindi	
2006	Kabhi Alvida Naa Kehna	Hindi	
2007	Marigold	Hindi	
2009	Wake Up Sid	Hindi	
2011	Rockstar	Hindi	
2012	Cocktail	Hindi	
2012	Jab Tak Hai Jaan	Hindi	
2014	Highway	Hindi	
2014	Finding Fanny	Hindi; English	
2015	Badlapur	Hindi	
2015	Shaandaar	Hindi	
2016	Ae Dil Hai Mushkil	Hindi	
2017	Secret Superstar	Hindi	
2018	Beyond the Clouds	Hindi	
2018	Sui Dhaaga	Hindi	
2020	Angrezi Medium	Hindi	
2021	Sandeep Aur Pinky Faraar	Hindi	
2022	Jersey	Hindi	
2022	Darlings	Hindi	
2023	Thank You for Coming	Hindi	
2025	Tu Meri Main Tera Main Tera Tu Meri	Hindi	
2026	Ikkis	Hindi	
2026	Kartavya	Hindi	

=== Writer ===
- Agni Varsha (2002)

=== Director ===
- Aaja Nachle (2007)
- Feelin (2011)
