= Vishwa =

- Poster
- Directed by: Shivamani
- Written by: Dialogues: Surendranath; R. Rajashekhar
- Screenplay by: Shivamani
- Story by: Rajkumar Santoshi
- Based on: Ghayal by Rajkumar Santoshi
- Produced by: Gurubabu
- Starring: Shiva Rajkumar; Ananth Nag; Suhasini; Suchitra Krishnamurthy
- Cinematography: Ramesh Babu
- Edited by: T. Shashikumar
- Music by: Hamsalekha
- Production company: Om Sri Guru Raghavendra Productions
- Release date: 20 August 1999
- Running time: 145 minutes
- Country: India
- Language: Kannada

Vishwa (transl. Universe) is a 1999 Indian Kannada-language action drama film directed by Shivamani and produced by Gurubabu. The film stars Shiva Rajkumar, Ananth Nag, Suhasini Maniratnam and Suchitra Krishnamurthy. It is a remake of Rajkumar Santoshi's Hindi film Ghayal (1990).

== Cast ==
- Shiva Rajkumar as Vishwa
- Ananth Nag as Vijay
- Suchitra Krishnamurthy as Usha
- Suhasini Maniratnam as Indu (Vijay's Wife)
- Thiagarajan as Special Commissioner D'Souza
- Srinivasa Murthy as Barristor Girish Rao
- Satya Prakash as Mahatma Guttedar, Drug smuggler
- Mimicry Dayanand as Boxing coach
- Lohithaswa as Police Commissioner Joshi
- Sathyajith as Inspector Syed
- Gayathri Prabhakar
- Shivaram
- S. V. Prasad as RK alias Radhakrishnan
- Kote Prabhakar as Kote, gangster
- Manjunath Hegde
- Negro Johnny
- Killer Venkatesh
- Madhusudhan Rao as Dragger alias Madhusudhan Reddy, a gangster (uncredited)

== Soundtrack ==
The soundtrack of the film was composed by Hamsalekha who also wrote the lyrics for the songs.

All tracks are written by Hamsalekha.

Track listing
No.	Title	Lyrics	Singer(s)	Length
1.	"Sagara Sagara"	Hamsalekha	Rajesh Krishnan & K. S. Chithra
2.	"Anna Anna"	Hamsalekha	Mano & Latha Hamsalekha
3.	"Cone Ice"	Hamsalekha	Mano & Sowmya Raoh
4.	"Hey Budda Budda"	Hamsalekha	B. Jayashree
5.	"Arasikere"	Hamsalekha	B. Jayashree
6.	"Vishwa Vishwa"	Hamsalekha	Rajkumar
