= Anu Aggarwal =

Indian model and actress

- Born: 11 January 1969 (age 57); New Delhi, India
- Occupations: Actress, model, social activist
- Years active: 1988–1996

Anu Aggarwal (born 11 January 1969) is a former Indian model and actress. She is best known for her work in Aashiqui, Khal-Naaikaa, The Cloud Door and Thiruda Thiruda.

== Early life and background ==
Anu was born on 11 January 1969 in Delhi and was also raised in New Delhi. She had been acting since her school days. When she was in grade 7, she passed a stiff competition to act in a monologue. Next year, when she was in grade 8, she started a theater group. In grade 9, she both acted in as well as directed a play. In grade 10, she began writing a script, when she had to stop everything due to her board exams. She was a gold medalist in sociology at Delhi University. After a brief stint in modelling, and VJing, and appearance in the Doordarshan serial Isi Bahane (1988), she made her Bollywood debut with the musical blockbuster Aashiqui, following which she was much in demand.

In 1997 she joined Yoga in Bihar School of Yoga and stayed there as a Karmayogi. In 1999 she was back in Mumbai to pack her things when a serious car accident happened. Aggarwal was in a coma for 29 days, which left her with no memory of her earlier life. After that in 2001 she became a monk. She lives in Mumbai and is single. She practices yoga. She stated in one of her interviews: "To feel strong, to walk amongst humans with a tremendous feeling of confidence and superiority is not at all wrong. The sense of superiority in bodily strength is borne out by the long history of mankind paying homage in folklore, song and poetry to strong women".

Aggarwal is a motivational TED featured speaker, runs Anu Aggarwal Foundation for mental health, environmental well-being, stress relief, and discovering joy in the challenged times of today.

== Filmography ==
| Year | Title | Role | Notes |
|---|---|---|---|
| 1990 | Aashiqui | Anu Verghese | Debut film |
| 1992 | Ghazab Tamasha | Ganga | |
| 1993 | Thiruda Thiruda | Chandralekha "Lekha" | Tamil film |
| 1993 | King Uncle | Fenni Fernando | |
| 1993 | Khal-Naaikaa | Anuradha Bakshi / Kiran | Nominated - Filmfare Award for Best Supporting Actress Remake of a 1992 Hollywood film, The Hand That Rocks the Cradle |
| 1994 | The Cloud Door | Princess Kurangi | Short movie (Cannes Film Festival) |
| 1995 | Janam Kundli | Kiran M Prasad / Kiran R. Kapoor | |
| 1995 | Ram Shastra | | Special appearance in the song "Love Machine" |
| 1996 | Return of Jewel Thief | Princess Vishaka | |

=== Television ===
| Year | Title | Role | Notes |
|---|---|---|---|
| 1988 | Isi Bahane | Parineeta | |
| 1994–1997 | Oye MTV | VJ | Launched MTV India |

== See also ==
- List of Indian film actresses
