= Babla Mehta =

Indian Hindi film playback singer

- Born: Babla Mehta; Delhi, India
- Died: July 22, 2025 Mumbai, Maharashtra, India
- Genres: Bhajans; Indian Classical; Playback singing
- Occupations: Singer; Composer; Audio Engineer
- Years active: 1989-2025

Babla Mehta was an Indian film playback singer, composer, and audio engineer hailing from Delhi, India. His career, which began in the late 1980s, was primarily focused on playback singing for Bollywood films, specializing in bhajans and Indian classical music genres. Mehta has recorded over 250 songs and released 10 solo albums throughout his career.

== Career ==
Babla Mehta gained prominence in the 1990s as a playback singer in Bollywood. His notable contributions include songs in films such as Tahalka (1992), Dil Hai Ke Maanta Nahi (1991), and Jeene Do (1990). He has collaborated extensively with music directors including Nadeem-Shravan, Rajesh Roshan, Bappi Lahiri, Anu Malik. His debut song in Hindi films, "Tere Mere Hoton Pe," featuring Lata Mangeshkar, marked a significant milestone in his career.

Beyond playback singing, Babla Mehta has ventured into composition. Notably, he set to music four poems authored by former Prime Minister Atal Behari Vajpayee, which were performed live on Vajpayee's birthday in New Delhi.

Babla Mehta is recognized for his dynamic live performances across various countries, including India, Canada, the United States, South Africa, and several European and Asian nations.

== Live albums and shows ==
Below is the list where Babla Mehta's songs were used (Bollywood movies), as well as his albums and live shows from various countries.

=== Filmography ===
Chandni (1989)

Jeene Do (1990)

Dil Hai Ke Manta Nahin (1991)

Sadak (1991)

Naamcheen (1991)

Beta (1992)

Tahalka (1992)

Janam Se Pehle (1994)

Pyar Ka Rog (1994)

Nazzar (1995)

Aatank Hi Aatank (1995)

=== Albums ===
Zuban Pe Dard Bhari Daastan (1987)

Mukesh ki Yaadein (Vols. 1-10) (1988)

=== Live Shows ===
Babla Mehta started as a stage artist. His live show audience spans continents to the West Indies, USA, Canada, UK, the Netherlands, Portugal, South Africa, Mauritius, Singapore, Thailand, and the Middle East:

- Rajesh Roshan show – World Tour
- Madhuri Dixit show – London, USA, Canada
- Shahrukh Khan, Juhi Chawla show – World Tour
- Bappi Lahiri show – South Africa
- Akshay Kumar show – World Tour
- Solo show on Raj Kapoor at Rang Sharda Auditorium
- Bandra Mumbai ‘Kehta Hai Joker’
- Golkonda Resort, Hyderabad
- Solo show on Raj Kapoor titled The Showman, Rang Sharda Auditorium, Bandra, Mumbai
- Live solo show in Mukesh titled Mukesh – RK to Big B at Manek Sabhagraha, Mumbai
- Live solo show on Mukesh titled Mukesh – RK to Big B at Siri Fort Auditorium, New Delhi

=== Bhajan Albums ===
- Sampoorna Sundar Kaand (1988)
- Bajrang Baan (1988)
- Mamta Ka Mandir (1991)
- Parv Kumbh Ka Nyara (1996)
- Jaya Shree Hanumaan (1997)
- Ram Charit Maanas (1997)
- Bhakti Saagar
- Jag Janani
- Pahadon wali matarani
