= Sharad Joshi =

Indian poet and writer (1931–1991)

- Born: 21 May 1931; Ujjain, Central India Agency, British India
- Died: 3 September 1991 (aged 60); Bombay, Maharashtra, India
- Occupations: Author, poet, satirist
- Spouse: Irfana Siddiqui
- Children: 3 daughters including Neha Sharad
- Website: sharadjoshi.co.in

Sharad Joshi was an Indian poet, writer, satirist and a dialogue and scriptwriter in Hindi films and television. He was awarded the Padma Shri in 1990.

== Biography ==
=== Early life and education ===
Sharad Joshi was born on 21 May 1931 in Ujjain, Madhya Pradesh to Shriniwas and Santi Joshi, a second child in the family of two sons, and 4 daughters.

=== Family ===
In the late 1950s, when Sharad Joshi was writing for newspapers and radio in Indore, he met and married Irfana Siddiqi (later Irfana Sharad). She was a writer, radio artiste and a theater actress from Bhopal. The couple had three daughters: Bani, Richa and Neha Sharad. Neha Sharad is an actress and poet.

== Career ==
=== Essays and plays ===
Sharad Joshi has written many satirical essays on political, social, cultural and economical topics, such as Atha Shri Ganeshaya Namah, Billiyon ka Artha Shastra, Buddhijivi, Sahitya ka Mahabali, Adhyaksha Mahodaya.

Sharad Joshi also wrote satirical plays. His plays Ek Tha Gadha Urf Aladad Khan and Andhon Ka Haathi are popular for satire and timeless humour

His books and essay collections include Parikrama, Kisi Bahane, Tilasm, Jeep par The Sawar Illian, Raha Kinare Baith, Meri Shreshth Rachnaye, Dusri Satah, Yatha Sambhav, Yatra Tatra Sarvatra, Yatha Samay, Ham Bhrashtan ke Bhrasht Hamare, and Pratidin

=== Filmography as dialogue writer ===
- Kshitij (1974)
- Chhoti Si Baat (1975)
- Shyam Tere Kitne Naam (1977)
- Saanch Ko Aanch Nahin (1979)
- Godhuli (1977)
- Chorni (1982)
- Utsav (1984)
- Mera Damad (1990)
- Dil Hai Ki Manta Nahin (1991)
- Udaan (1997)
- Sholey(1986)

=== TV serials ===
- Yeh Jo Hai Zindagi (1984–85)
- Vikram Aur Betal
- Wah Janaab (1984)
- Daane Anar Ke
- Shrimatiji
- Sinhasan Battisi
- Yeh Duniyan Gazab Ki
- Pyale Mai Toofan
- Guldasta
- Lapataganj (2009)

== Legacy ==
Madhya Pradesh government has instituted an award in his memory titled, "Sharad Joshi Samman", given each year to individuals for outstanding achievement in the field of writing. It includes a cash award of Rs. 51,000 and citation.

His daughter Neha Sharad also organized Shradotsav in 2016, a literary and theatre festival (which has plays as well as a book fair), to commemorate her father's work.

== See also ==
- Hindi Literature
