= Aashiqui =

1990 Indian film by Mahesh Bhatt

- Theatrical release poster
- Directed by: Mahesh Bhatt
- Written by: Robin Bhatt; Akash Khurana
- Produced by: Gulshan Kumar
- Starring: Rahul Roy; Anu Aggarwal; Deepak Tijori
- Cinematography: Pravin Bhatt
- Edited by: Dimpy Bahl
- Music by: Nadeem–Shravan
- Production company: Super Cassettes Industries Limited
- Distributed by: Super Cassettes Industries Limited
- Release date: 23 July 1990
- Running time: 150 minutes
- Country: India
- Language: Hindi
- Budget: est.₹30 Lakh
- Box office: est.₹5 crore

Aashiqui (transl. Romance) is a 1990 Indian musical romantic drama film directed by Mahesh Bhatt, and produced by Gulshan Kumar under Super Cassettes Industries Limited (now T-Series Films) production banner. The film stars Rahul Roy and Anu Aggarwal in pivotal roles. The first installment of the Aashiqui series, the film is known for its music, with composer duo Nadeem–Shravan establishing their careers along with that of singer Kumar Sanu under the T-Series music label.

Upon release, it received positive reviews and emerged as a commercial success. It was the best selling Bollywood album at the time of its release. The soundtrack album sold 20 million units, making it the best-selling Bollywood soundtrack album of all time. A cover version of one of its songs, "Dheere Dheere" was later performed by Yo Yo Honey Singh and released in 2015.

At the 36th Filmfare Awards, the film received 7 nominations and won four awards in music. The film was remade in Kannada as Roja (2002). A sequel to the film, Aashiqui 2, with a completely new theme, directed by Mohit Suri with Aditya Roy Kapur and Shraddha Kapoor, was released on 26 April 2013.

== Plot ==
Rahul is angry with his dad for marrying a second wife, while his mother is still alive. In rage and in fury he pays an uninvited visit to the wedding where he throws his mother's mangalsutra and all the other household items she preserved. He breaks the windows of the wedding car and is hence arrested and sent to the nearest police station. Meanwhile, Anu runs away from an oppressive girls' hostel run by Arnie Campbell, who immediately reports to the police station that she is missing. The police catch her and keep her at a nearby police station (which happens to be the same one where Rahul is held).

While waiting for Arnie, Rahul offers Anu his jacket, which she accepts. Arnie then arrives and takes her back to the oppressive hostel, promising the police inspector that this will not happen again. After they leave, the inspector turns to Rahul and offers him some advice, then releases him to return to his broken home. Rahul can not stop thinking about the beautiful Anu. The very next day, Rahul goes to the hostel area wishing to meet her and spots his jacket hanging outside. Since she lives in a girl's hostel there is no way he can enter. Hence, he plays cricket with his friend and deliberately hits the ball into the compound. The security lets him inside to retrieve the ball. Rahul goes inside and sees Anu climbing a ladder. She is very surprised by his presence and falls off the ladder. Rahul is unable to express his feelings for her so he writes a note on the electricity bill his mother told him to pay that very day. Anu takes the note and leaves. His mother becomes upset that Rahul did not pay the bill and asks his 'Master' (tailor) to help get the bill back.

The tailor helps Rahul retrieve the bill, along with a reply from Anu requesting him to meet her at the main city library the following Saturday. He arrives on time eagerly, where Anu tells him she has nothing to give him except a "thank you", but Rahul says no one can stop him from loving her, not even herself. Soon after he leaves, Arnie catches her and takes her to Ooty (another town) to be admitted to another hostel. Rahul employs a spy to eavesdrop and see where Anu is going. The spy learns about Anu's travel plans and informs Rahul, who goes along with his friend to search for Anu and finds the place she is staying. They find out that Arnie actually planned to get Anu married and lied to her about transferring her to a new hostel, because she would not have agreed.

At the hostel, Arnie organises a farewell party for Anu and Anu invites Rahul, who promises to attend the party. After the party they plan to elope. At the party, he runs away with Anu and then Arnie catches them by using the police. Anu has to return with Arnie and go to Ooty, while Rahul returns to his home. After a few months, Rahul approaches Mr. Arnie as he can not forget his friend Anu, who he knows is unhappy. Rahul then finds out from Arnie that Anu is an orphan who has a distant relative in Ooty named Uncle Peter who is an alcoholic. Long long ago, Peter had signed the documents to have full custody over her.

Rahul asks Arnie about Anu's whereabouts and other details so that he could help her settle (and be more happy) and Arnie (wanting to help Anu) reveals everything. They both find Anu in a miserable state with Uncle Peter and bribe the uncle for a sum of 20,000 rupees on the condition that he signs documents giving up his legal guardianship of Anu. After Anu is finally free from Arnie, the hostel and Uncle Peter, she wishes to become self-reliant and seeks admission in a typing institute. One day, she comes across a job advert searching for a model to run for "Jean Cardin" brand of clothes in Mumbai who requests Anu to audition. Anu agrees and wins a sum of 10,000 rupees along with a free tour of Paris and a secured residence. She thanks Rahul for all his help, but Rahul tells her that he loves her deeply and wants to marry her as soon as possible. Anu agrees, but she says she will need some time to prepare.

Rahul's mother, on hearing their story visits Anu and offers some advice, as she knows Anu is a lonely orphan, advising her not to marry him until he achieves something in life as equality of status between partners is essential for a healthy relationship. The next day, Rahul comes to the place where Anu is having a photo shoot session. He hears the man in charge telling her to change into a swimming costume, to which Rahul objects. He tells him that they were planning to get married soon and he disapproves of such revealing clothes. He is even more shocked when he learns that Anu already signed a contract promising she would not get married for two years. Rahul is heartbroken by her decision and pens Anu a letter written with his blood.

As the years go by, Rahul establishes himself as a singer while Anu is also successful as a model. Rahul plans to meet Anu now, but Padamsee reveals to Rahul that it's thanks to Anu that his debut record was released to market, which hurts Rahul deeply as he now doubts his own mettle and talent. Hence, Rahul cancels their marriage plans. Anu, grieved by Rahul's decision, decides to further her career under director Padamsee, who persuades her to accompany him to Paris.

Rahul's mother enlightens him that Anu had refused to marry him earlier because of her suggestion, and that Anu was only a medium for his talent to reach the public - it was his singing that made him successful and popular. She urges him to go back to Anu, his true love. When Rahul comes to stop her from boarding the flight, Anu agrees to abandon the director and stays behind to renew their relationship.

== Cast ==
- Rahul Roy as Rahul (voice dubbed by Aditya Pancholi)
- Anu Aggarwal as Anu
- Deepak Tijori as Balu
- Avtar Gill as Police Inspector Deshpande
- Tom Alter as Arnie Campbell
- Reema Lagoo as Rahul's mother
- Homi Wadia as Padamsee
- Mushtaq Khan as Rafoo Master
- Javed Khan as Uncle Peter
- Anang Desai as Mr. Paul
- Virendra Saxena as Street Singer
- Sunil Rege as Vikram Roy

== Soundtrack ==
"Dheere Dheere Se"
"Dheere Dheere Se", a filmi-ghazal song composed by Nadeem–Shravan, and sung by Kumar Sanu and Anuradha Paudwal.

The music for Aashiqui was composed by the duo Nadeem–Shravan (Nadeem Akhtar Saifi and Shravan Kumar Rathod) and lyrics were written by Sameer, Rani Mallik and Madan Pal. The soundtrack largely falls under the filmi-ghazal genre, based on the ghazal style. The soundtrack album sold 2 crores units. This made it the best-selling Bollywood soundtrack album of all time, as well as one of the best-selling albums of any genre in India. The soundtrack was #4 on the list of "100 Greatest Bollywood Soundtracks of All Time", as compiled by Planet Bollywood.

=== Dheere Dheere ===
A cover version of the song "Dheere Dheere Se" was later performed by Indi-pop artist Yo Yo Honey Singh, released as "Dheere Dheere" in 2015. The song's music video features actors Hrithik Roshan and Sonam Kapoor. As of November 2023, the song has received over 700 million views on YouTube.

== Awards and nominations ==
Year	Category	Nominee(s)	Result
36th Filmfare Awards	Best Director	Mahesh Bhatt	Nominated
36th Filmfare Awards	Best Supporting Actress	Reema Lagoo	Nominated
36th Filmfare Awards	Best Music Director	Nadeem-Shravan	Won
36th Filmfare Awards	Best Lyricist	Rani Malik (for "Dheere Dheere")	Nominated
36th Filmfare Awards	Best Lyricist	Sameer (for "Nazar Ke Saamne")	Won
36th Filmfare Awards	Best Male Playback Singer	Kumar Sanu (for "Ab Tere Bin")	Won
36th Filmfare Awards	Best Female Playback Singer	Anuradha Paudwal (for "Nazar Ke Saamne")	Won

== Sequels ==
A sequel titled Aashiqui 2 was released on 26 April 2013 with Aditya Roy Kapur and Shraddha Kapoor in the lead roles, which was directed by Mohit Suri. Commercially, the sequel surpassed the collections of Aashiqui, becoming a blockbuster. After the success of the first two installments, the producers announced a third installment, as Aashiqui 3 directed by Anurag Basu with Kartik Aaryan and Sreeleela in the lead roles.
