= Dil (1990 film) =

1990 Indian film by Indra Kumar

- Movie Poster
- Directed by: Indra Kumar
- Written by: Kamlesh Pandey (dialogues); Naushir Khatau
- Screenplay by: Rajeev Kaul; Praful Parekh
- Produced by: Indra Kumar; Ashok Thakaria
- Starring: Aamir Khan; Madhuri Dixit; Anupam Kher; Saeed Jaffrey
- Narrated by: Madhuri Dixit
- Cinematography: Baba Azmi
- Edited by: Hussain A. Burmawala
- Music by: Anand–Milind
- Production company: maruti International
- Release date: 22 June 1990
- Running time: 180 minutes
- Country: India
- Language: Hindi
- Budget: ₹2 crore
- Box office: est. ₹20 crore ($11.42 million)

Dil (transl. Heart) is a 1990 Indian Hindi-language romantic action film, starring Aamir Khan, Madhuri Dixit, Anupam Kher, and Saeed Jaffrey. It was directed by Indra Kumar in his directorial debut, written by Naushir Khatau and Kamlesh Pandey, with music composed by Anand–Milind.

Dil was released on 15 June 1990 and became the highest-grossing film of the year. It received positive reviews from critics upon release, with praise for its soundtrack and performances of the cast.

At the 36th Filmfare Awards, Dil received 8 nominations, including Best Film, Best Actor (Khan) and Best Supporting Actor (Kher), with Dixit winning her first Best Actress award for her performance in the film.

The film was remade in Telugu as Tholi Muddu (1993). The film was also remade in Kannada as Shivaranjani (1997). The film was the highest-grossing film of the year.

== Plot ==
Miserly and greedy Hazari Prasad wants a rich woman's marriage proposal for his son Raja, a college student and spendthrift interested in spending money on wild parties. Raja meets the beautiful and arrogant Madhu Mehra. Enraged by her, he misleads her into believing that he is blind. He mocks her when she finds out, and they quickly prank each other.

Hazari looks for a bride with a large dowry for Raja. He finds his involvement in the wastepaper business makes Raja a less-than-stellar marriage prospect. Accidentally, he runs into Madhu's rich father, Mr.Mehra. Hazari gives beggars large amounts of money to masquerade as wealthy acquaintances. He befriends Mehra, deciding on an alliance for Raja and Madhu, but when the two find the truth, they disagree with their fathers' plan.

On a weekend college retreat, Madhu falsely accuses Raja of trying to rape her. With his reputation ruined, he reprimands her for her dishonesty, saying many take revenge, but he is different. Madhu instantly falls for Raja, who now develops love for her too. Mehra discovers Hazari's true circumstances; he insults him, who takes offense. Raja and Madhu are forbidden to see each other again. Nevertheless, Raja and Madhu secretly meet.

When Mehra finds this, he pays thugs to beat Raja, who manages to sneak into the Mehra house and marry Madhu. Mehra banishes her from the house. Hazari also disowns Raja, who moves into a small shack with Madhu and works as a constructionist. Despite their poverty, they live happily until Raja is hurt at a construction site. Madhu leaves to beg Hazari for money to pay for an emergency operation.

He agrees, but only if she divorces Raja. Hazari removes her mangalsutra(wedding necklace) Madhu returns to Mehra and is forgiven, but he orders her to never see Raja. When he recovers, Hazari lies that Madhu never visited him at the hospital. Believing Madhu deserted him, Raja returns to his home.

His mother, Savitri, reveals that Madhu was blackmailed by Hazari. Raja rushes to stop Madhu from taking a plane to London, but is late as it takes off. Luckily, she didn't take the plane and met him. They reunite, and everyone lives happily as Hazari and Mehra repent for their deeds.

== Cast ==
- Aamir Khan as Raja Prasad
- Madhuri Dixit as Madhu Mehra Prasad
- Anupam Kher as Hazari Prasad
- Saeed Jaffrey as Mr. Mehra
- Padmarani as Savitri Prasad
- Shammi as Malini Mehra
- Adi Irani as Shakti
- Deven Verma as Inspector Ghalib
- Satyen Kappu as Girdhari Laal
- Rajesh Puri as Pandit Ji
- Kishore Bhanushali as Dev
- Dinesh Hingoo as Pandu Prakashan
- Viju Khote as Police Constable
- Ajit Vachani as Potential in law of Hazari Prasad

== Soundtrack ==
The lyrics of all songs were written by Sameer, and the music was composed by Anand-Milind. The song "O Priyaa Priyaa" was originally composed by Ilaiyaraaja, and originally sung by Chithra and S. P. Balasubrahmanyam in the Telugu film Geethanjali.

Vocals for Khan and Dixit were performed by their then-frequent collaborators, Udit Narayan and Anuradha Paudwal in five and four songs, respectively. Sadhana Sargam lent her voice for the other two songs.

The soundtrack was very popular. According to the Indian trade website Box Office India, with around 2,000,000 units sold, the soundtrack became the fourth highest-grossing album of the year.

The song "Hum Pyar Karne Wale" was remixed in the 2026 film Dhurandhar: The Revenge, by Shashwat Sachdev. The remix version featured the original vocals by Narayan and Paudwal, with a rap performed by Qveen Herby.

No.	Title	Singer(s)	Length
1.	"Mujhe Neend Na Aaye"	Udit Narayan, Anuradha Paudwal	06:14
2.	"Hum Pyar Karne Wale"	Udit Narayan, Anuradha Paudwal	06:57
3.	"Humne Ghar Chhoda Hai"	Udit Narayan, Sadhana Sargam	06:18
4.	"Khambe Jaisi Khadi Hai"	Udit Narayan	05:26
5.	"Dum Duma Dum"	Udit Narayan, Anuradha Paudwal	06:40
6.	"O Priya Priya"	Suresh Wadkar, Anuradha Paudwal	06:03
7.	"Saansein Teri Chalti Rahe" (Sad)	Sadhna Sargam	02:16
Total length:			39:54

== Awards and nominations ==
At the 36th Filmfare Awards, the film won one award out of eight nominations.

Award	Category	Recipients and nominees	Results
36th Filmfare Awards	Best Film	Indra Kumar	Nominated
36th Filmfare Awards	Best Actor	Aamir Khan	Nominated
36th Filmfare Awards	Best Actress	Madhuri Dixit	Won
36th Filmfare Awards	Best Supporting Actor	Anupam Kher	Nominated
36th Filmfare Awards	Best Music Director	Anand–Milind	Nominated
36th Filmfare Awards	Best Lyricist	Sameer for "Mujhe Neend Na Aaye"	Nominated
36th Filmfare Awards	Best Male Playback Singer	Suresh Wadkar for "O Priyaa Priyaa"	Nominated
36th Filmfare Awards	Best Female Playback Singer	Anuradha Paudwal for "Mujhe Neend Na Aaye"	Nominated
