= Anuradha Paudwal =

Indian playback singer (born 1954)

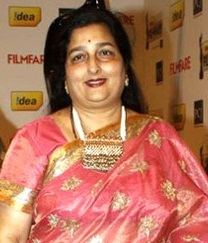
- Paudwal in 2011
- Born: 27 October 1954 (age 71); Karwar, Mysore State, India
- Occupations: Playback singer; Bhajan singer
- Years active: 1973–present
- Political party: Bharatiya Janata Party (2024–present)
- Spouse: Arun Paudwal (m. 1969; died 1991)
- Children: 2, including Kavita Paudwal
- Awards: See below
- Honours: Padma Shri (2017)
- Musical career
- Genres: Filmi; Bhajan
- Instrument: Vocals
- Label: T-Series; Tips Music; Venus Records & Tapes

Anuradha Paudwal née Nadkarni (born 27 October 1954) is an Indian playback singer and politician who works predominantly in Hindi cinema and Odia cinema. She is considered as one of the greatest and most popular Bhajan singer of all time and also as one of the most successful playback singers of Bollywood. The recipient of several accolades including a National Film Award, four Filmfare Awards (winning consecutively during 1990–92), six Maharashtra State Film Awards and two Odisha State Film Awards, she has been honoured by the Government of India with the Padma Shri, the country's fourth-highest civilian honour for her contribution in the field of arts. Her contribution in Indian devotional music and Bollywood Industry gained her the honorific titles such as "Bhajan Queen", "Melody Queen, and "The Eternal voice of devotion".

She was honoured with honorary degree of D.Litt. by D Y Patil University, the second singer to receive this degree after Lata Mangeshkar. She is engaged in social work and had a foundation named Suryodaya Foundation. In her career spanning over five decades Paudwal has recorded more than 9,000 songs for more than 550 movies and more than 1,500 bhajans in several languages including Gujarati, Hindi, Kannada, Marathi, Sanskrit, Bengali, Tamil, Telugu, Odia, Assamese, Punjabi, Bhojpuri, Brajbhasha, Nepali and Maithili. She is ranked NO. 26 in Youtube's Music Charts and Insights list of top global artist as of 6 February 2025. She has been on chart since last 237 weeks. She has been awarded a doctorate in music by DY Patil University, felicitated by the house of commons in England and awarded the Cultural ambassador to Indian devotional by the United Nations in New York City.

She started her political career by joining Bharatiya Janata Party on 16 March 2024 ahead of 2024 Indian general election.

== Career ==
Paudwal made her debut with a Sanskrit verse in the 1973 Hindi film Abhimaan, composed by S. D. Burman. She has also sung in films across several including Marathi, Odia, Nepali, Bengali and Kannada.

=== Early days and success ===
Before entering in Bollywood she sang on a Radio program. She started her music journey in 1973 with the film Abhimaan where she sang a Sanskrit verse for Jaya Bhaduri. In the 1970s, she sang a few popular songs which were praised by the music composers as well as the public, but doesn't get much popularity. At that time she sang as a dubbing artist.

She gained popularity from her song "Tu Mera Janu Hai" along with Manhar Udhas in the film Hero. She had been asked to "dub" this song for the actual singer – Lata Mangeshkar. Later Lataji was to have sung the song for the actual recording. But when music director duo Laxmikant-Pyarelal heard Anuradha's version, they determined that since the movie had an actress, Meenakshi Seshadri, making her debut, it was only appropriate that the song should also be sung by a fresh voice. After that in mid-80s, she sang along with Mohammed Aziz, and this duo was highly liked by public. It was at this time that Anuradha Paudwal started to climb the ladder of success. After that she sang songs with established singers of that time and worked with many music composers. At that time she met Nadeem–Shravan who were struggling at that time. She listened to some of their songs and asked them to compose music for her. They composed 23 songs which were sung by her along with Kumar Sanu, Udit Narayan, Abhijeet Bhattacharya, Babla Mehta among others. Ten songs out of them are to be released as Chahat album, which were later released as film songs in Aashiqui movie in 1990.

==== As an established singer ====
When the music of the film Aashiqui was released, it became popular in no time. It established Anuradha Paudwal as a successful playback singer. After that Dil Hai Ke Manta Nahin, and Sadak were released in 1991, which were also immensely successful. Several other albums release at that time made her an established singer and she was often given preference over Mangeshkar sisters. When she was at the peak of her career, she decided to sing exclusively for T-Series. And after this her immensely successful Bollywood career started falling slowly and other female playback singers like Alka Yagnik, Kavita Krishnamurti and Sadhana Sargam came into prominence.

Her songs became so popular that Binaca Geetmala list of 1990 had 14 songs of her. Her songs "Too Mera Hero Hai" from Hero, "My Name is Lakhan" from Ram Lakhan and "Maine Pyaar Tumhi Se Kiya Hai" from Phool Aur Kaante topped the list in 1984, 1989 and 1992 respectively. Once O.P. Nayyar in one of his interview said "Lata ka yug gaya ab, Anuradha ka yug aa gaya" meaning "Lata's era is over now, Anuradha's era has arrived".

==== As a bhajan singer ====
After quitting Bollywood she started singing devotional songs. One day before Navratri Gulshan Kumar asked Anuradha Paudwal to sing devotional songs of maa Durga. Anuradha sang those bhajans and when these were released in market these sold immediately. After this she started singing devotional songs one after one and never look back again. Her Bhajans are extremely popular in India specially her Shiv and Durga bhajans. Apart from Hindu Bhajans she also sang some Islamic, Christian, Jain, Boddha, and Sikhh Devotional songs. She has sung thousands of bhajans and is still active in Bhajan singing.

==== Re-entry in Bollywood ====
In 1997 Gulshan Kumar got murdered and after that Anuradha Paudwal again started to sing songs for other music labels. She again started working with Tips Industries, Venus Records & Tapes, and others. She got some of the best songs and became popular again, but at that time Alka Yagnik was dominating the Industry and Anuradha Paudwal did not receive much success which she achieved earlier. She continued to sing till 2006 and after that she quit Bollywood.

=== Work with other singers ===
She started her music journey from 1973. She has worked with Kishore Kumar, Mohammed Rafi, S.P. Balasubrahmanyam, Yesudas, Manna Dey, Mohammed Aziz, Kumar Sanu, Udit Narayan, Sonu Nigam, Mukesh, Pankaj Udhas, Manhar Udhas, Suresh Wadkar, Nitin Mukesh, Abhijeet Bhattacharya and many other male singers.

She has worked with Kavita Krishnamurti, Alka Yagnik, Sadhana Sargam, Asha Bhosle and many other female singers.

After working with almost all notable singers and musicians and establishing herself as an established singer she completely quit Bollywood in 2006. She sang her last song 'Palkein uthake Dekhiye' in film Jaane Hoga Kya.

== Legacy ==
Paudwal recorded 23 songs with the music composer duo Nadeem–Shravan. These songs were used in 3 films – Aashiqui, Dil Hai Ke Manta Nahin and Sadak. All three films were blockbusters, and for the songs, Anuradha Paudwal won two Filmfare Awards. Aashiqui is the third most selling album ever in Indian Music Industry. Dil Hai Ke Manta Nahin was 5th most selling soundtrack of 1991. Her popularity during early 1990s was very high. Sadak was the third best-selling album of 1991. These songs were released under the label T-Series.

She has sung thousands of songs in several languages. She has won four Filmfare Awards out of twelve nominations.

== Television and albums appearance ==
Paudwal is one among the most popular singers in India. She has appeared in The Kapil Sharma Show as a guest along with Udit Narayan and Kumar Sanu. She has also appeared in popular singing show Indian Idol as a special guest where she share some of the memories of her career. Apart from this, She has also appeared in Sa Re Ga Ma Pa singing reality show. She has also appeared in Superstar Singer Season 2 singing reality show.

She has also appeared in many devotional albums like Shiv Amritwani, Mamta Ka Mandir, Hanuman Amritwani and also has special appearances in various Bollywood Movies like Saathi, Hum Aapke Dil Mein Rehte Hain, Jai Maa Vaishno Devi

== Personal life ==
She was born 27 October 1954 as Alka Nadkarni, in a Marathi speaking family in Karwar. She was married to Arun Paudwal, a music composer, with whom she had a son Aditya and a daughter Kavita, a singer by profession. Anuradha survived a helicopter crash in 2002 in Madhya Pradesh. On 12 September 2020, her son Aditya died of kidney failure.

== Awards and recognitions ==
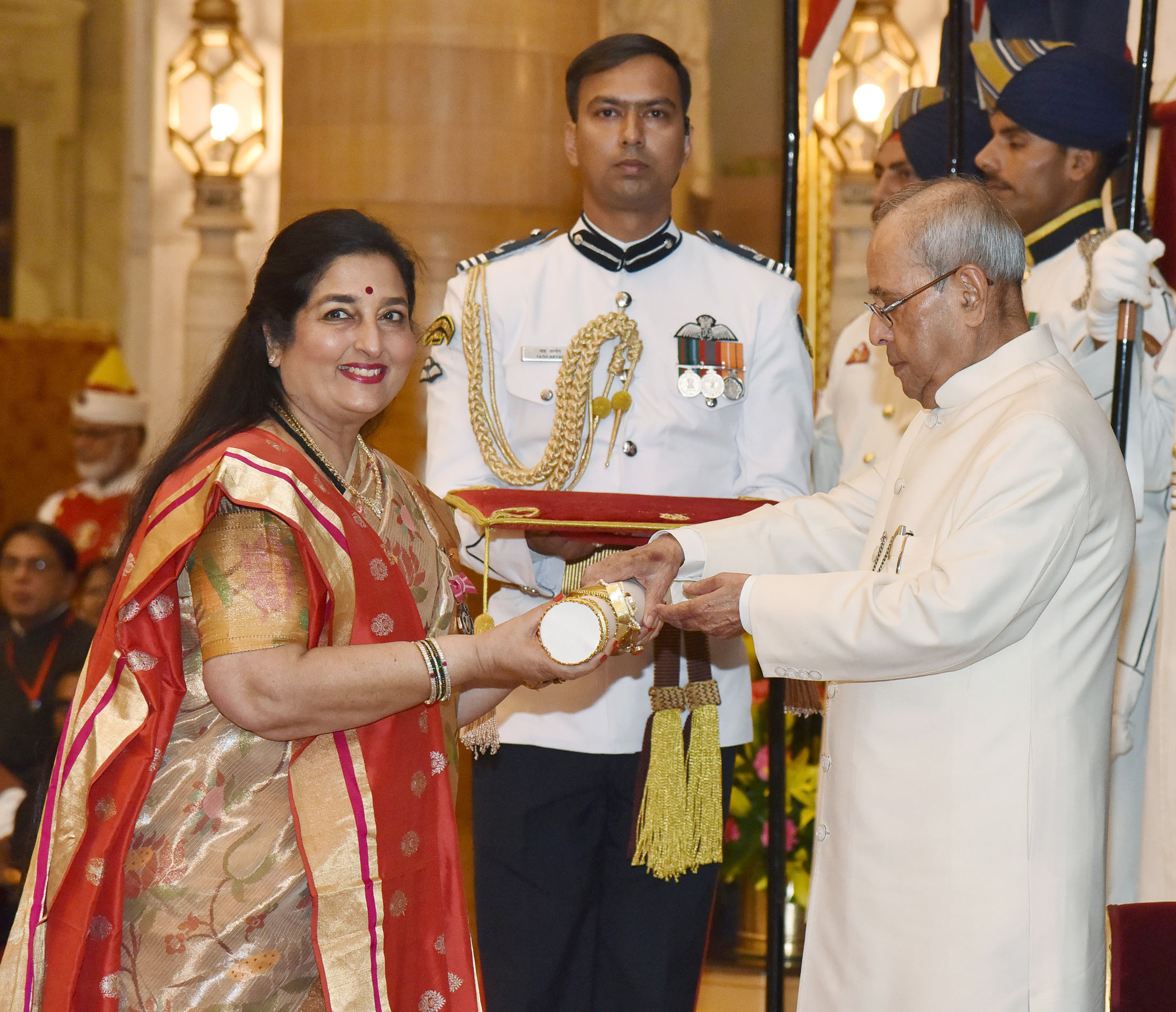
The President of India Pranab Mukherjee presenting the Padma Shri Award to Anuradha Paudwal, at a Civil Investiture Ceremony, at Rashtrapati Bhavan, in New Delhi on 30 March 2017

She has been honoured with many awards including 4 Filmfare Awards, 1 National Film Award, 6 Maharashtra State Film Awards, 2 Odisha State Film Awards and Padma Shri by Government of India. Her other accolades are as follows:

- 2017: Padma Shri by Government of India
- 2013: Mohammed Rafi Award by Government of Maharashtra
- 2011: Mother Teresa Award for Lifetime Achievement
- 2010: Lata Mangeshkar Award by the Madhya Pradesh Government
- 2024: Lata Mangeshkar Award by the Government of Maharashtra

=== Filmfare Awards ===
Won

- 1986: Best Female Playback Singer – "Mere Man Bajo Mridang" (Utsav)
- 1991: Best Female Playback Singer – "Nazar Ke Saamne" (Aashiqui)
- 1992: Best Female Playback Singer – "Dil Hai Ke Manta Nahin" (Dil Hai Ke Manta Nahin)
- 1993: Best Female Playback Singer – "Dhak Dhak Karne Laga" (Beta)

Nominations

- 1983: Best Female Playback Singer – "Maine Ek Geet Likha Hai" (Yeh Nazdeekiyan)
- 1984: Best Female Playback Singer – "Tu Mera Hero Hain" (Hero)
- 1989: Best Female Playback Singer – "Keh Do Ki Tum" (Tezaab)
- 1990: Best Female Playback Singer – "Tera Naam Liya" (Ram Lakhan)
- 1990: Best Female Playback Singer – "Bekhabar Bewafa" (Ram Lakhan)
- 1991: Best Female Playback Singer – "Mujhe Neend Na Aaye" (Dil)
- 1992: Best Female Playback Singer – "Bahut Pyar Karte Hain " (Saajan)
- 1993: Best Female Playback Singer – "O Rabba Koi To Bataye" (Sangeet)

=== Maharashtra State Film Awards ===
- 1981: Maharashtra State Film Award for Best Female Playback Singer – Raja Lalkari Ashi De (Are Sansar Sansar)
- 1982: Maharashtra State Film Award for Best Female Playback Singer – Vishawalli Asuni Bhavti (Ek Daav Bhutacha)
- 1987: Maharashtra State Film Award for Best Female Playback Singer – Mi Aale Nighale (Gammat Jammat)
- 1990: Maharashtra State Film Award for Best Female Playback Singer – Ratra Aahe Reshmachi (Aamchyasarkhe Aamhich)
- 1993: Maharashtra State Film Award for Best Female Playback Singer – Chal Yena Mithit Ghena (Aikava Te Navalach)
- 1997: Maharashtra State Film Award for Best Female Playback Singer – Moharle Mi Sajna (Paij Lagnachi)

=== National Film Awards ===
- 1989: Best Playback Singer (Female) – "He Ek Reshami" Kalat Nakalat (Marathi)

She was the first singer to receive the award in Marathi language.

=== Odisha State Film Awards ===
- 1987: Odisha State Film Award for Best Singer – Tunda Baida
- 1997: Odisha State Film Award for Best Singer – Khandaei Akhi Re Luha

=== Guild Film Awards ===
- 2004: Nominated for Apsara Award for Best Female Playback Singer for "Intezaar" – Paap

=== Others ===
- She was honoured with D Litt degree by the D.Y. Patil University.
- The Citizen Award, which she received at the hand of late Shri Rajiv Gandhi in 1989 .
- The prestigious Mahila Shiromani award in 1993 at the hands of the first lady Smt. Vimal Sharma.
- Honoured with 'Mahakaal Award' by the Madhya Pradesh govt.2004
- Kishore Samman by Samrat Sangeet Sadhana Seva Samiti.

== See also ==
- List of Indian playback singers
- List of bhajan singers
- List of Padma Shri award recipients (2010–2019)
