= Mogambo (disambiguation) =

Mogambo is a 1953 American film.

Mogambo may also refer to:

- Mogambo (horse) (foaled 1983), a retired American Thoroughbred racehorse
- Mogambo, the main villain in Mr. India, a 1987 Indian film
- "Mogambo", a 2018 single by Riz Ahmed from The Long Goodbye

== See also ==
- Mocambo (disambiguation)
