= Amrish Puri filmography =

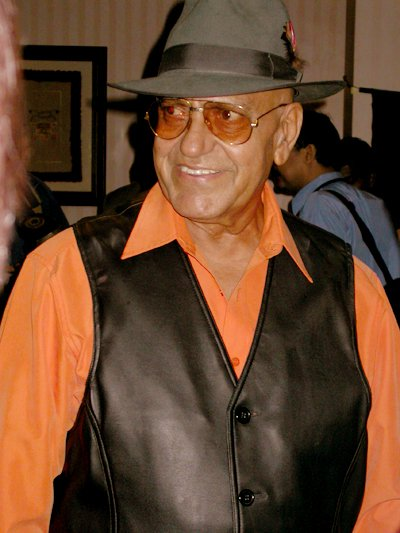
Puri in 2001

Amrish Puri (22 June 1932 – 12 January 2005) was an Indian actor, who was an important figure in Indian theatre and cinema. He is remembered for playing iconic villainous roles in Hindi cinema as well as other Indian and international film industries. He remembered for playing various roles in variety of film genres, specially iconic villainous roles in Hindi Cinema, as well as International Cinema. His role as Mogambo in Shekhar Kapur's Hindi film Mr. India (1987) is considered as one of greatest villains in Indian Cinema and to foreign audiences he is best known as Mola Ram in Steven Spielberg's Hollywood film Indiana Jones and the Temple of Doom (1984).

While he predominantly worked in Hindi-language films, he had also appeared in Telugu, Kannada, Tamil, Malayalam and Marathi language films. Puri won three Filmfare Awards for Best Supporting Actor.

== Hindi ==
Year	Films	Role	Notes
1956	Bhai-Bhai	Goon	
1967	Maya	Police Chief	TV Series
1970	Prem Pujari	Jerry	
1971	Reshma Aur Shera	Rehmat Khan	
1971	Hulchul	Public Prosecutor	
1971	Khilonewala		Short film
1973	Sone Ke Haath	Rana	
1973	Hindustan Ki Kasam		
1975	Salaakhen	Master	
1975	Nishant	Anna, the eldest Zamindar	
1975	Daaku	Daaku Panna	
1976	Manthan	Mishraji	
1976	Chhatrabhang	Narrator	
1977	Smothered Voices		
1977	Immaan Dharam	Dharam Dhayal	
1977	Bhumika	Vinayak Kale	
1977	Sat Sri Akal	Jalme singh	
1977	Rangaa Aur Raja		
1977	Paapi	Michael	
1977	Gyaniji	Jaalim Singh	
1977	Alibaba Marjinaa	Jabbar	
1978	Kondura	Konduraswamy	
1978	Hungama Bombay Ishtyle	Jaggu Ustad	
1978	Bandie	Anand	
1979	Hamare Tumhare	General Manager	
1979	Jaani Dushman	Geeta's Kidnapper	
1979	Sawan Ko Aane Do	Chandrika's dad	
1979	Naiyya	Pannalal	
1979	Lakhan	Deewan Hariprasad	
1979	Junoon	Narrator	
1980	Chann Pardesi	Joginder Singh	
1980	Aakrosh	Public Prosecutor Dushane	
1980	Qurbani	Rakka	
1980	Gehrayee	Tantric Magician	
1980	Dostana	Balwant Singh	
1980	Hum Paanch	Veer Pratap Singh	
1980	Patthar Se Takkar	Dr. Anand	
1980	Maan Abhiman	Madhuraprasad Chowdhary	
1981	Krodhi	Madhavan	
1981	Kalyug	Kishan Chand	
1981	Naseeb	Don	
1981	Be-Shaque	Gopal	
1981	Nai Imarat	Rajaram / Rajju	
1982	Ek Aur Sangraam		
1982	Apna Bana Lo	Mr. Joshi	
1982	Ashanti	Raja Bhishm Bahadur Singh	
1982	Aadat Se Majboor	Agnihotri	
1982	Shakti	J.K. Verma	
1982	Johny I Love You	Zalim Singh	
1982	Gandhi	Dada Abdullah Hajee Adab	
1982	Vidhaata	Jagavar Chowdhary	
1982	Vijeta	Chief Instructor Varghese	
1982	Sugandh		
1982	Main Inteqaam Loonga	Goverdhan Das (GD)	
1983	Nishaan	Bhagail Singh	
1983	Andha Kanoon	Mr. Ram Gupta	
1983	Ardh Satya	Anant's Father	
1983	Coolie	John D'Costa	
1983	Mandi	Darvish	
1983	Hero	Pasha	
1983	Haadsa	R.K. Chakravarty	
1983	Bekhabar	Rai Bahadur Singh / Kundan Singh	
1984	Bhool		
1984	Aakhir		
1984	Mashaal	S.K.Vardhan	
1984	Insaaf Kaun Karega	Bhanupratap	
1984	Gangvaa	Special Appearance	
1984	Duniya	Balwant Singh Kalra	
1984	Jagir	Lakhan	
1984	Awaaz	Moolchand	
1984	Jhootha Sach	Kolga	
1984	Kasam Paida Karne Wale Ki	Udaybhan Singh	
1984	Zakhmi Sher	Swami Kashinath Singh	
1984	Yeh Desh	Dhulia	
1984	Party	Doctor	
1984	Bandh Honth		
1985	Mohabbat	Choudhary	
1985	Zabardast	Balram Singh	
1985	Meri Jung	G.D. Thakral	Filmfare Award for Best Supporting Actor
1985	Teri Meherbaniyan	Thakur Vijay Singh	
1985	Phaansi Ke Baad	Damodar Seth	
1985	Patthar Dil	Rana Surajbhan Singh	
1985	Paisa Yeh Paisa	Jugal	
1985	Karm Yudh	Sohanlal Puri	
1985	Aghaat	Chakradev	
1986	Pyar Ho Gaya	Sapna's Father	
1986	Kaanch Ki Deewar	Bhoop Singh	
1986	Aap Ke Saath	Persha	
1986	Sultanat	Razoulli Al-Jabber Al-Nasser	
1986	Janbaaz	Rana Vikram Singh	
1986	Begaana	A.P. Lall	
1986	Samundar	Raiszada Narsingh	
1986	Asli Naqli	Durjan Singh	
1986	Dosti Dushmani	Daga	
1986	Ek Aur Sikander	Sher Khan / Dilawar Khan	Dual role
1986	Tamas	Sardar Teja Singh	TV series
1986	Ricky	Manglu	
1986	Naseeb Apna Apna	Bhim Singh	
1986	Nagina	Baba Bhairon Nath	
1986	Rimjhim Geeton Ki	Himself	Guest appearance
1986	Mera Dharam	Thakur Digvijay Singh	
1986	Maa Ki Saugandh	Daaku Hoshiyar	
1986	On Wings of Fire	Nihavand ruler	
1987	Khazana	Narrator	
1987	Loha	Sher 'Shera' Singh	
1987	Dadagiri	Bhanupratap	
1987	Madadgaar	Sunita's Mama	
1987	Dance Dance	Raja Bahadur A.M. Singh	
1987	Mr. India	Mogambo	
1987	Hawalaat	Seth Dharam Das	
1987	Sadak Chhap	Dharamdas, MP	
1987	Kaun Jeeta Kaun Haara		
1987	Pharam Dharam	Shamshera	
1987	Sher Shivaji		
1987	Jawab Hum Denge	Dhanraj	
1987	Inaam Dus Hazaar	Captain S.P. Singh	
1987	Dil Tujhko Diya	Mohla	
1987	Dance Dance	Raja Bahadur A.M. Singh	
1987	Raj Kapoor	Himself	Special appearance
1988	Bharat Ek Khoj	Mohammed Raza Khan	TV series
1988	Hum Farishte Nahin	Pashrutam Das / Din Dayal	
1988	Shahenshah	J.K. Verma	
1988	Khoon Bahaa Ganga Mein		
1988	Waaris	Dulla K. Singh	
1988	Mohabbat Ke Dushman	Shahbaaz Khan	
1988	Commando	Marcelloni	
1988	Rukhsat	Jagdish Chopra	
1988	Janam Janam	Yuvraj Thakur Balbir Singh	
1988	Dayavan	Inspector Ratan Singh	
1988	Gangaa Jamunaa Saraswathi	Thakur Hansaj Singh	
1988	Yateem	Dacoit Porkhiya	
1988	Saazish	Diwan	
1988	Mar Mitenge	Ajit Singh	
1988	Hamara Khandaan	Chandraprakash Singh (Vishal's dad)	
1989	Jurrat	Kama	
1989	Mil Gayee Manzil Mujhe	Shamsher Chattopadhya	
1989	Suryaa: An Awakening	Gangadhar Chowdhary	
1989	Do Qaidi	K.K	
1989	Farz Ki Jung	Jai Kishan (JK)	
1989	Ilaaka	Nagar	
1989	Daata	Gopal Das	
1989	Naa-Insaafi	Billa	
1989	Tridev	Bhujang / Bhairav Singh	Nominated–Filmfare Best Supporting Actor Award
1989	Batwara	Hanumant Singh	
1989	Hisaab Khoon Ka	Ranvir Pushp	
1989	Jaadugar	Mahaprabhu Janak Sagar Jagat Narayan Chintamani	
1989	Aag Se Khelenge	Zakha	
1989	Tujhe Nahin Chhodunga		
1989	Ram Lakhan	Bhisambar Nath	
1989	Nigahen : Nagina Part II	Bhairon Nath	Voice
1989	Nafrat Ki Aandhi	Chandidas Khurana	
1989	Mujrim	Khan	
1989	Mera Farz		
1990	Vidrohi	Dacait Naag Singh	
1990	Hatim Tai	Jaadugar Kamlaq	
1990	Naaka Bandi	Mangal Singh / Santhal	
1990	Ghayal	Balwant Rai	
1990	Aaj Ka Arjun	Thakur Bhupendra Singh	
1990	Doodh Ka Karz	Raghuvir Singh	Marathi Film
1990	Tejaa	Jarahwar	
1990	Qayamat Ki Raat	Shera	
1990	Muqaddar Ka Badshaah	Vikral Singh	
1990	Kishen Kanhaiya	Lala Gendamal	
1990	Kaarnama		
1990	Jeene Do	Thakur Sher Bahadur Singh	
1991	Trinetra	Singhania	
1991	Mohabbat Pehli Nazar Mein		
1991	Jigarwala	Dhurjan Singh	
1991	Iraada	Dinanath	
1991	Benaam Badsha	Jaikal	
1991	Ajooba	Vazir	
1991	Saudagar	Chuniya	Nominated– Filmfare Best Villain Award
1991	Dharam Sankat	Jagira	
1991	Phool Aur Kaante	Nageshwar "Don"	Nominated–Filmfare Best Supporting Actor Award
1991	Shikari: The Hunter	Nahar Singh	
1991	Garajna		Unreleased film
1991	Numbri Aadmi	Rana	
1991	Mast Kalandar	Raja Sahab	
1991	Kohraam	Daaku Kaaliya	
1992	Suraj Ka Satvan Ghoda	Mahesar Dalal	Sydney Film Festival, Best Actor Award, Singapore International Film Festival, Best Actor Award
1992	Ramayana: The Legend of Prince Rama	Ravana	Voiceover in Hindi-dubbed version
1992	I Love You		
1992	Vishwatma	Azghar Jurhad	
1992	Vansh	Vilasrao Chaudhary	
1992	Zindagi Ek Jua	Bhalla	
1992	Deewana	Dhirend (Ravi's uncle)	
1992	Tahalka	General Dong	Nominated- Filmfare Best Villain Award
1992	Muskurahat	Gopichand Verma	Nominated- Filmfare Best Supporting Actor Award
1992	Time Machine		Incomplete film
1993	Divya Shakti	Tau	
1993	Kundan	Thakur Shamsher Singh	
1993	Damini	Barrister Indrajit Chaddha	Nominated–Filmfare Best Villain Award
1993	Gardish	Purushottam Sathe	Nominated–Filmfare Best Supporting Actor Award
1993	Purab Ki Laila Paschim Ka Chaila: Hello India		Unreleased film
1993	Sangram	Raja's father	
1994	Elaan	Ramakant Chaudhry	
1994	Maha Shaktishali		
1994	Pehla Pehla Pyaar	Hukam Singh	
1994	Droh Kaal	IG Pathak	
1994	Tejaswini	Lala Khurana	
1994	Paramaatma	Chaudhry Rudranarayan	
1995	Mohabatto Ka Safar		
1995	Karan Arjun	Thakur Durjan Singh	Nominated–Filmfare Best Villain Award
1995	Jallad	Himself	Special appearance
1995	Jai Vikraanta	Thakur Jaswant Singh	
1995	Maidan-E-Jung	Thakur Ranvir Singh 'Daata Guru'	
1995	Prem	Vanraja	
1995	Hulchul	Shobraj	
1995	Oh Darling! Yeh Hai India!	Don Quixote	
1995	Gundaraj	Police Inspector	
1995	Dilwale Dulhania Le Jayenge	Chaudhry Baldev Singh	Nominated–Filmfare Best Supporting Actor Award
1995	Haqeeqat	ACP. Shivcharan	
1995	Paappi Devataa	Ratan Seth	
1995	Kartavya	Thakur Ugranarayan Singh	
1996	Vijeta	Wing Commander Varghese	
1996	Tu Chor Main Sipahi	Thakur Gajendra Singh	
1996	Jeet	Gajraj Choudhary (Underworld Don)	
1996	Diljale	Dara	
1996	Beqabu	ACP Amritlal Bakshi	
1996	Ghatak	Shambu Nath	Filmfare Award for Best Supporting Actor; Star Screen Award for Best Supporting Actor
1996	Smuggler		
1996	Sardari Begum	Hemraj	
1996	Jaan	Surya Dev Singh	
1997	Koyla	Raja Saab	Nominated- Filmfare Best Villain Award
1997	Mahaanta	Seth. Kedar Nath	
1997	Tarazu	Appa Rao	
1997	Pardes	Kishorilal	
1997	Chachi 420	Durgaprasad Bhardwaj	
1997	Virasat	Raja Thakur	Filmfare Award for Best Supporting Actor; Star Screen Award for Best Supporting Actor
1997	Itihaas	Pradhan Des Pandey	
1997	Nimayak	Balwant	
1997	Himalay Putra	Seema's father	Special appearance
1997	Dhaal	Pilot Baba	
1998	Sham Ghansham	Collector Bhim Singh	
1998	Salaakhen	Jaspal Rana	
1998	Barood	Mr.Singhal	
1998	Jhooth Bole Kauwa Kaate	Abhayankar	
1998	Doli Saja Ke Rakhna	Jojo Pinto	
1998	Dhoondte Reh Jaaoge!	Voice	
1998	China Gate	Col. Kewal Krishan Puri	
1999	Lal Baadshah	Thakur Dhayal Singh	
1999	Aarzoo	Dayashankar	
1999	Zulmi	Balraj Dutt	
1999	Jai Hind		
1999	Taal	Jagmohan Mehta	
1999	Baadshah	Suraj Singh Thappar	Nominated– Filmfare Award for Best Villain
1999	Gair	C.K Oberoi	
1999	Kaala Samrajya	Kaalkeshwar Singh	
2000	Badal	ACP Ranjeet Singh	
2000	Ek Ajooba	Guruji	
2000	Dhaai Akshar Prem Ke	Yagvender Gareval	
2000	Mohabbatein	Major General Khanna	Special appearance
2000	Shaheed Uddham Singh	The Sufi Saint	
2001	On Wings of Fire	Nihavand ruler	
2001	Zubeidaa	Suleiman Seth	
2001	Censor	Pandit Shiv Prasad	
2001	Chori Chori Chupke Chupke	Kailashnath Malhotra	
2001	Mujhe Kucch Kehna Hai	Balram Singh	
2001	Gadar: Ek Prem Katha	Mayor Ashraf Ali	Nominated– Filmfare Award for Best Villain; Nominated– Zee Cine Award for Best Actor in a Negative Role
2001	Yaadein	Jagdish Kumar Malhotra	
2001	Nayak: The Real Hero	Chief Minister Balraj Chauhan	
2002	Badhaai Ho Badhaai	Mr. Chaddha	
2002	Shararat	Prajapati	
2002	Jaani Dushman: Ek Anokhi Kahani	Sadhu	Special appearance
2002	Rishtey	Yashpal Chaudhary	
2003	Khushi	Vir Bhadra Singh	
2003	The Hero: Love Story of a Spy	ISI Chief Ishak Khan	
2003	Jaal: The Trap	Major Amrish Kaul	
2003	Out of Control	Jatta Singh Bedi	
2003	Dil Pardesi Ho Gayaa	Brigadier Sarfaroz Khan	
2004	Surya	Thakur	
2004	Police Force: An Inside Story	Mr. Pandey	
2004	Dev	Chief Minister Bhandarker	
2004	Lakshya	Brigadier Gautam Puri	
2004	Garv: Pride and Honour	Commissioner Samar Singh	
2004	Mujhse Shaadi Karogi	Colonel Dugraj Singh	
2004	Taarzan: The Wonder Car	Kartar Singh/Paaji	
2004	Aitraaz	Mr. Ranjit Roy	
2004	Hulchul	Angaar Chand	
2004	Ab Tumhare Hawale Watan Saathiyo	Narrator	
2004	Woh Tera Naam Tha	Ustad Samad Khan	
2005	Kisna: The Warrior Poet	Bhairo Singh	
2006	Kachchi Sadak	Jailor	Final film
2010	Aahat – Ek Ajib Kahani		The film was shot in 1971; Posthumous release
2023	Gadar 2	Ashraf Ali (Sakina's father)	Posthumous appearance via computer generated imagery
2026	Hum Mein Shahenshah Koun		Posthumous release; Shot in 1989

== Punjabi ==
Year	Films	Role	Notes
1981	Chann Pardesi	Jangirdar Joginder Singh	
1999	Shaheed Udham Singh (film)	The Sufi Saint	

== Bengali ==
Year	Films	Role	Notes
1978	Bandie	Ananda	Bengali debut; Bengali version of Bandie
1984	Teen Murti	Thakur Lakhan Singh	Bengali version of Jagir

== Telugu ==
Year	Films	Role	Notes
1978	Anugraham	Kondura /AppikondaSwami	
1988	Aakhari Poratam	Anantananda Swamy	
1990	Kondaveeti Donga	Khaadra /SP	
1990	Jagadeka Veerudu Athiloka Sundari	Mahadrashta	
1991	Aditya 369	Raja Varma	
1992	Aswamedham	Vyaghra	
1993	Major Chandrakanth	Gnaneswara Rao	
1993	Nippu Ravva	Balagam Dhanraj	

== Kannada ==
Year	Films	Role	Notes	Ref.
1973	Kaadu	Chandra Gowda		
1976	Phalitamsha		Cameo	
1980	Subbi Subbakka Suvvalali			
1981	Simhada Mari Sainya	Balbir Gupta		
1984	Gandu Bherunda	Professor Jai		
2004	Love	Saligrama Oberoi		

== Tamil ==
Year	Films	Role	Notes
1991	Thalapathi	Kalivardhan	
2002	Baba	Tantrik	

== Malayalam ==
Year	Films	Role	Notes
1996	Kaalapani	Mirza Khan	

== Marathi ==
Year	Films	Role	Notes	Ref(s)
1971	Shantata! Court Chalu Aahe		Adaptation of Vijay Tendulkar's Marathi play of same name	

== English ==
Year	Films	Roles	Notes	Ref(s)
1982	"Gandhi"	Khan		
1984	"Indiana Jones and the Temple of Doom"	Mola Ram		
