= Tom, Dick, and Harry (2006 film) =

2006 Indian film by Deepak Tijori

- Theatrical release poster
- Directed by: Deepak Tijori
- Screenplay by: Kamal Pandey; Yunus Sajawal
- Story by: Kamal Pandey; Yunus Sajawal
- Produced by: Sudhir Kumar; Surendra Bhatia; Avinash Bhatia; Rajan Prakash
- Starring: Dino Morea; Jimmy Sheirgill; Anuj Sawhney; Celina Jaitly; Kim Sharma
- Cinematography: Manoj Soni; Yusuf Khan
- Edited by: Hemal Kothari
- Music by: Himesh Reshammiya
- Production company: Oracle Entertainment
- Distributed by: Shree Ashtavinayak Cine Vision
- Release date: 12 May 2006
- Running time: 140 minutes
- Country: India
- Language: Hindi

Tom, Dick, & Harry is a 2006 Indian Hindi-language comedy film released on 12 May 2006. It stars Dino Morea, Jimmy Sheirgill, Anuj Sawhney, Celina Jaitly, Rakesh Bedi, Kim Sharma, Gulshan Grover and Shakti Kapoor. Its music was composed by Himesh Reshammiya, who made a special appearance in the film. The screenplay is actually a mixture of two different plots taken from two different films with similar titles: the 1941 American film Tom, Dick and Harry and the 1993 Hong Kong film Tom, Dick and Hairy.

It pays a small tribute to Bollywood as it contains multiple references to older films and has a number of Bollywood characters from earlier movies.

== Plot ==
This is a comedy about three physically impaired men: Tarun/Tom (deaf), Deepak/Dick (blind), and Harshvardhan/Harry (mute). They live together as paying guests, and their life takes an endearing turn when a beautiful girl named Celina comes to live in the bungalow opposite their house. They start making their moves to cast an impression on her, who is least interested in acknowledging their presence. In Tom’s life there’s Bijlee, a fisherwoman, who is completely besotted by him and does not leave any stone unturned to express her desire. On the other hand, there is Suprano (Gulshan Grover), a bad man who is out to prove that he is the worst villain ever and has with him some of Bollywood's most dreaded criminals, Shakaal from the film Shaan, Gabbar Singh from Sholay, and Mogambo from Mr. India, making an indestructible Suprano. Tom, Dick, and Harry unknowingly become the target of Supran by being the biggest barriers in his business deals. The movie depicts the three friends' struggles with their disabilities and how they have to fight against Suprano.

== Cast ==
- Dino Morea as Tarun "Tom"
- Jimmy Sheirgill as Harshvardhan "Harry"
- Anuj Sawhney as Deepak "Dick"
- Celina Jaitly as Celina
- Kim Sharma as Bijli
- Gulshan Grover as Suprano
- Shakti Kapoor as Inspector P.K. Waghmare
- Rakesh Bedi as Happy Singh
- Kunickaa Sadanand as Jassi Singh
- Shashi Kiran as Shopkeeper Sadanand
- Avtar Gill as Celina's uncle D'Souza
- Shehzad Khan Dharam Dayal Teja
- Himesh Reshammiya as himself in songs "Tanha Jiya Na Jaye", "Tere Sang Ishq" and "Zara Jhoom Jhoom" (special appearance)
- Tulsi Kumar as herself in song "Tere Sang Ishq" (special apperarance)

== Reception ==
=== Critical reception ===
Taran Adarsh of Bollywood Hungama said, "The choice of the story and screenplay is what acts as a major turn-off, the music is the only saving grace. Dino Morea tries hard, but in vain. His timing is just not right. Jimmy Shergill doesn't deliver either. And why is he looking pale at most times? Anuj Sawhney is excellent and is the best performer in the crowd. He's a complete natural. Celina is wasted. Kim Sharma will be loved by the commoners. Gulshan Grover is efficient as the weird don. On the whole, Tom Dick and Harry is too weak a fare to leave any impression whatsoever".

=== Box office ===
It grossed ₹ 8 crore at the box office, altogether the total net gross was₹11 crore.

== Soundtrack ==
Music is composed by Himesh Reshammiya.

All lyrics are written by Sameer.

Track listing
No.	Title	Singer(s)	Length
1.	"Jhoom Jhoom"	Himesh Reshammiya	6:08
2.	"Tere Sang Ishq"	Himesh Reshammiya, Tulsi Kumar	4:57
3.	"Jhoom Jhoom (Remix)"	Himesh Reshammiya	5:13
4.	"Tanha Jiya Na Jaye"	Himesh Reshammiya, Ahir	4:54
5.	"Tere Sang Ishq (Remix)"	Himesh Reshammiya, Tulsi Kumar	4:12
6.	"Yeu Kasi Kasi"	Sonu Nigam, Richa Sharma	4:17
7.	"Chheena Re Chheena"	Sunidhi Chauhan, Arya	4:36
8.	"Tanha Jiya Na Jaye (Remix)"	Himesh Reshammiya, Ahir	4:54
9.	"Chheena Re Chheena (Remix)"	Sunidhi Chauhan	3:28
10.	"O Mitra Re"	Kunal Ganjawala	5:08
11.	"Yeu Kasi Kasi (Remix)"	Sonu Nigam, Richa Sharma	3:30
12.	"O Mitra Re (Remix)"	Kunal Ganjawala	4:29
Total length:			55:46

== Sequels ==
A sequel, titled Tom, Dick, and Harry: Rock Again..., entered production in 2009. It was directed by Rahul Kapoor and starred a completely different cast altogether.

In 2016, another sequel went into production directed by Deepak Tijori and starring Jimmy Sheirgill, Aftab Shivdasani, Sharman Joshi, Sana Khan, Pooja Chopra and Amyra Dastur.
