= Javed Khan Amrohi =

Indian actor (1949-2023)

- Born: 24 March 1949; Bombay, Bombay Province, India
- Died: 14 February 2023 (aged 73); Mumbai, Maharashtra, India
- Occupation: Actor
- Years active: 1973–2023

Javed Khan Amrohi (24 March 1949 – 14 February 2023) was an Indian film and television actor. He started his acting career in the theatre in the 1970s and then later in films. He worked in a number of theatrical productions and over 150 films in his career. He made his acting debut with the film Jalte Badan (1973) and then continued to play supporting roles throughout in the 1970s and 1980s, appearing in many films including hits like Satyam Shivam Sundaram, Woh 7 Din, Tridev and Aashiqui.

Amrohi was best known for his roles in the Academy Award-nominated film Lagaan: Once Upon a Time in India (2001), Andaz Apna Apna (1994), and Chak De! India (2007). He also worked in TV series such as Mirza Ghalib, directed by Gulzar, and as Karim (the barber) in Nukkad, directed by Saeed Akhtar Mirza in the 1980s. Amrohi was also a member of the acting faculty at Zee TV's Zee Institute of Media Arts in Mumbai. He died from respiratory failure on 14 February 2023, at the age of 73.

== Filmography ==
- Jalte Badan (1973) as College Student
- Ram Bharose (1977)
- Alibaba Marjinaa (1977)
- Doosara Aadmi (1977)
- Satyam Shivam Sundaram: Love Sublime (1978) as Shastry's Son
- Prem Bandhan (1979) as Eve teaser
- Jhoota Kahin Ka (1979) as Jagjit
- Noorie (1979) as Faulad Khan
- Patthar Se Takkar (1980) as Havaldar
- Nakhuda (1981) as Nawab (Waiter)
- Naram Garam (1981) as Chandu
- Aagaman (1982)
- Apna Bana Lo (1983) as Tebri
- Prem Rog (1982) as Kedara
- Sun Sajna (1982) as Chotu (Gopi's brother)
- Kalka (1983 film) as Verma
- Talabandi (1983)
- Pasand Apni Apni (1983) as Maruti
- Rang Birangi (1983) as Seller Tickets in Kino
- Woh Saat Din (1983)
- Lorie (1984) as Bus Conductor
- Ram Teri Ganga Maili (1985) as Manglu
- Baadal (1985) as Vikram's Man
- Meraa Ghar Mere Bachche (1985) as Ramswarup Seksaria - Newsweek's photographer
- Faasle (1985) as Nandu
- Jhanjaar (1986) as Pujari
- Jaal (1986) as Gundhu
- Pahuche Huwey Log (1986) as Murari
- Gharwali Baharwali (1988 film) ...Dinu Servant
- Pyaar Ka Mandir (1988) as Patient
- Waaris (1988) as Chhotey
- Guru (1989 film)
- Hathyar (1989 film) as Pickpocketer
- Tridev (1989) as Ramu
- Baap Numbri Beta Dus Numbri (1990)
- Aashiqui (1990) as Uncle Peter
- Baaghi (1990) as Col Sood Servant
- Saathi (1991) as Beer Bar Tender
- Sadak (1991) as Pakya (Prakash)
- Abhi Abhi (1992) as Driver
- Ek Ladka Ek Ladki (1992) as Police Constable
- Bol Radha Bol (1992) as Postman
- Insaaf Ka Khoon (1993)
- Platform (1993)
- Hum Hain Rahi Pyar Ke (1993) as Thief Chotteya
- Santaan (1993) as Postman
- Laadla (1994) as Employee
- Andaz Apna Apna (1994) as Anand Akela
- Inteqam Ke Sholay (1995)
- Coolie No. 1 (1995) as Driver who rejects Govinda's marriage proposal
- Sarhad: The Border of Crime (1995) as Kapadia, Bank Branch Manager
- Bade Miyan Chote Miyan (1998) as Constable who brought in Sharafat Ali
- Hello Brother (1999)
- Chal Mere Bhai (2000) as Murari
- Lagaan: Once Upon a Time in India (2001) as Ram Singh
- Ek Aur Ek Gyarah: By Hook or by Crook (2003) as Raju Nepali
- Shaadi No. 1 (2005) as Marriage Registrar
- Kyon Ki... (2005) as Inmate #33
- Tom, Dick, and Harry (2006) as Soprano's assistant
- Phir Hera Pheri (2006) as Havaldar
- Umrao Jaan (2006) as Peer Baksh
- Chak De! India (2007) as Sukhlal
- Dhoom Dadakka (2008)
- Coffee House (2009)
- Sadak 2 (2020) as Pakya
- Heer Express as Dr. Verma (Posthumous Release)

=== TV Series ===
- Yeh Jo Hai Zindagi (1984) as Jhumroo (servant)
- Nukkad (1986) as Karim Hajaam (barber)
- Mirza Ghalib (1988)
- Kuch Bhi Ho Sakta Hai (1995)
- Ghar Jamai (1997) as Hotel receptionist (Guest role only in episode no 42)
- Powder (2010) as Advocate Siddiqui
- Kirdaar as various roles
- Vishnu Puran as Rishi Vishwamitra
- Shaktimaan (1998) as thief
