= Mr. Black Mr. White =

2008 film by Deepak Shivdasani

Mr. Black, Mr. White
- Movie poster for Mr Black, Mr White
- Directed by: Deepak Shivdasani
- Written by: Deepak Shivdasani
- Produced by: Bipin Shah
- Starring: Sunil Shetty; Arshad Warsi; Ashish Vidyarthi
- Cinematography: Thomas Xavier
- Edited by: Steven Bernard
- Music by: Shamir Tandon; Tauseef Akhtar; Jatin–Lalit
- Production companies: White House Productions; T.A. Shah Group of Companies
- Distributed by: Eros International
- Release date: 2 May 2008
- Running time: 136 mins
- Country: India
- Language: Hindi

Mr. White Mr. Black is a 2008 Indian Hindi-language film directed by Deepak Shivdasani, starring Sunil Shetty, Arshad Warsi, Anishka Khosla, Rashmi Nigam, Sharat Saxena, Ashish Vidyarthi and Sadashiv Amrapurkar. The film also features foreign actresses Tania Zaetta and former Miss Thailand Kamala Ning.

== Plot ==
Gopi, a simpleton, arrives in Goa from a hamlet (small village) in India, Hoshiyarpur, to hand over a tiny piece of land to his dad's friend's son, Kishen, which was his father's last wish. Kishen, now a conman, swindles people with a little help from his accomplice, Babu, to earn enough money to educate his sister Divya, who's studying in London.

When Kishen gets to know that Gopi has reached Goa to meet him, he avoids him. Only because he thinks that he is a gang member, then when he finds out the truth. He doesn't want to give up his flourishing business and travel to Hoshiyarpur just to take possession of a measly piece of land.

However, Gopi is adamant about taking Kishen back and is aided by Tanya (whom he meets later in the movie), the daughter of the owner of KG Resorts. Little do they realise that the three girls are staying at KG Resorts with stolen diamonds worth crores. When Kishen, Babu, and everyone else learn about this, they all make a mad rush for KG Resorts. Gopi finds himself a part of the gang.

== Cast ==
- Suniel Shetty as Gopal Murli Manohar / Gopi
- Arshad Warsi as Kishen / Hari
- Anushka Ramesh as Tanya
- Sharat Saxena as Inspector Brown
- Rashmi Nigam as Anuradha
- Sandhya Mridul as Teenie
- Tania Zaetta as Meenie
- Kamala Ning
- Manoj Joshi as Tulsi, cab driver
- Ashish Vidyarthi as Don Ladla
- Atul Kale as Babu
- Sadashiv Amrapurkar as K. G.
- Vrajesh Hirjee as Sardar Anand
- Upasana Singh as Sardar's wife
- Mahima Mehta as Divya, Kishen's sister.
- Shehzad Khan as Sagar
- Kiran Kumar as Gorakh
- Shiva Rindani as Rana
- Deep Dhillon as Bakhtawar

== Soundtrack ==
Jatin–Lalit are composing the score, two years after their separation. This is the first movie where Mika Singh and his brother Daler Mehndi have sung together.

#	Title	Singer(s)
1	"Ek Dil Ki"	Udit Narayan, Shaan, Alka Yagnik
2	"Teetar"	Sukhwinder Singh, Vasundhara Das
3	"Samandar"	Neeraj Shridhar, Suzanne D'Mello, Sweta Mohanty
4	"Tu Makke Di Roti"	Daler Mehndi, Mika Singh, Asha Bhosle
5	"Behna Ki Shaadi"	Sonu Nigam, Shailender Singh
6	"Namasteji"	Kunal Ganjawala
7	"Teetar" (Remix)	Sukhwinder Singh, Vasundhara Das
8	"Samandar II"	Suzanne D'Mello, Sweta Mohanty
9	"Samandar" (Remix)	Neeraj Shridhar, Suzanne D'Mello
10	"Tu Makke Di Roti" (Remix)	Daler Mehndi, Mika Singh, Asha Bhosle
