= Popcorn Khao! Mast Ho Jao =

- Movie poster for Popcorn Khao! Mast Ho Jao
- Directed by: Kabir Sadanand
- Written by: Kabir Sadanand, Raghuvir Shekhawat
- Starring: Akshay Kapoor; Tanishaa; Rashmi Nigam; Deepak Tijori
- Music by: Vishal–Shekhar
- Release date: 1 October 2004
- Country: India
- Language: Hindi

Popcorn Khao! Mast Ho Jao (English: Eat Popcorn and Enjoy) is a 2004 Indian Hindi-language romantic comedy film directed by Kabir Sadanand and starring Akshay Kapoor, Tanishaa, Rashmi Nigam and Yash Tonk. Deepak Tijori and Kabir Sadanand make special appearances in the film. Serbian model Jelena Jakovljevic did an item number "Dupatta Beimaan Re" in the film. It marked the acting debut of Kapoor and Nigam and was the directorial debut of Sadanand. Produced under the banner of Pritish Nandy Communications, the film received poor reviews from critics, upon its premiere and performed poorly at the box office.

== Plot ==
College-goers Rahul, Tanya, and Goldie are members of the Kurta Gang. These three friends are also part of a love triangle: Goldie loves Tanya, who in turn loves Rahul. The situation becomes even more complex when Sonia (Rashmi Nigam) takes admission into their college. Rahul falls in love with Sonia. All these friends continued their education in college and did not confess their love. After college, Sonia begins a relationship with Yash (Kabir Sadanand). Rahul moves to Mumbai to start his career as a music director and decides he will not meet his friends until he becomes famous. Sonia's dad, VK, selects him for his next music video.

== Cast ==
- Akshay Kapoor as Rahul Malhotra
- Tanishaa as Tanya Sharma
- Rashmi Nigam as Sonia Kapur
- Yash Tonk as Sameer “Goldie”
- Deepak Tijori as VK, Sonia's father
- Kabir Sadanand as Yash
- Jelena Jakovljević as an item number in song "Dupatta Beimaan Re"

== Production ==
When Sadanand told his friends about the title of his new film they expressed their surprise and called him mad. To know whether people would be able to recall the title, Sadanand went to Lokhandwala and asked 10 unknown people about the recall potential of the title. Instead of choosing actors through a screen test he organised a workshop for actors. Kapoor and Nigam were finalised after this workshop. He also cast Mukherjee whom he had spotted at an award ceremony. The scene in the film, where she was seen against the setting sun was shot without prior planning. This was Nigam's debut film.

== Soundtrack ==
Popcorn Khao Mast Ho Jao

Soundtrack album by Vishal–Shekhar
- Released: 15 July 2004
- Genre: Feature film soundtrack
- Length: 7:33
- Language: Hindi
- Label: Sony Music India
- Producer: Kabir Sadanand

Vishal–Shekhar chronology
Jhankaar Beats (2003)	Popcorn Khao Mast Ho Jao (2004)	Bluffmaster! (2005)

The soundtrack and background score was composed by Vishal Dadlani and Shekhar Ravjiani, with lyrics penned by Vishal Dadlani. Rediff.com Patcy N. called the songs "Dupatta Beimaan Re", "O Solemiya" and "Le Chale" catchy. She appreciated Jakovljevi's performance in the item number and called her attractive. Rediff.com's Seema Pant praised Sunidhi Chauhan's voice in "Dupatta Beimaan Re" and "O Solemiya". She noted that "Dooriyan"'s remix should have been left alone since the original track was better. Pant advised music fans to avoid the title track "Popcorn Khao! Mast Ho Jao" because "it [had] nothing to offer".

Track listing
No.	Title	Lyrics	Singer(s)	Length
1.	"Kal Se Koi"	Vishal Dadlani	Shaan	4:25
2.	"Dupatta Beimaan Re"	Vishal Dadlani	Sunidhi Chauhan	4:18
3.	"Le Chale"	Vishal Dadlani	KK, Mahalakshmi Iyer	4:34
4.	"O Solemiya"	Vishal Dadlani	Sunidhi Chauhan	4:42
5.	"Dooriyan"	Vishal Dadlani	Richa Sharma	5:25
6.	"Popcorn Khao! Mast Ho Jao"	Vishal Dadlani	Vishal Dadlani	3:56
7.	"Move The Dupatta (Bonus The Mix)"	Vishal Dadlani	Sunidhi Chauhan	5:02
8.	"Dooriyan (Feel The Rhythm Mix)"	Vishal Dadlani	Richa Sharma	4:26

== Reception ==
Rediff.com's Patcy N. said that the director had shown only three hours of dialogue. She called the flashbacks "frustrating" but appreciated Tijori's and Tonk's acting. She criticised Nigam for her poor dialogue delivery and Tanisha for her "bad" acting. She went further and opined that Tanisha should learn acting from her sister Kajol. Patcy noted that Kapoor was good only in emotional scenes and questioned why he [appeared] shirtless in so many scenes? She advised Sadanand not to take the audience for granted. Pratim D. Gupta of The Telegraph called it an unwatchable film. Writing for India Today, Anupama Chopra termed the film "bland and boring". She added that the film's story was "more muddled than memorable". She concluded her review by writing "I didn't get it." The film failed to do well at the commercial box office. Rediff.com declared it a commercially flop film.
