= Gollu Aur Pappu =

2014 Hindi film

- Film poster
- Directed by: Kabir Sadanand
- Written by: Kabir Sadanand
- Produced by: Ajit Andhare
- Starring: Vir Das; Sandeepa Dhar; Dimple Kapadia; Kunaal Roy Kapur; Deepak Tijori
- Production company: Viacom 18 Motion Pictures
- Distributed by: Viacom18 Motion Pictures
- Release date: 21 November 2014
- Country: India
- Language: Hindi

Gollu Aur Pappu (transl. Gollu and Pappu) is a 2014 Indian Hindi-language film directed by Kabir Sadanand and featuring Vir Das, Sandeepa Dhar, Dimple Kapadia, Kunaal Roy Kapur and Deepak Tijori in pivotal roles.

== Plot ==
Gollu (Vir Das) and Pappu (Kunaal Roy Kapur) are brothers who both appear to be somewhat stupid. Pappu always wanted to be a mechanic, but they both performed poorly in school and are now jobless. Gollu is in love with Pari Madam (Karishma Tanna), who, unknown to Gollu, is a police inspector.

Gustaad Khan (Deepak Tijori) is the head of a local terrorist organization, whose face and real name are not known by the public or police. Pari leads a special team to hunt down Gustaad. In a crossfire between Pari's team and Gustaad's men, Gustaad escapes safe and sound, making Pari's superior very upset and he decides to transfer her to Delhi.

Gustard has planned a terrorist attack by deploying a bomb on the statue of a religious figure. Hundreds of people are expected to worship the statue the next day. Gollu, however, mistakenly breaks the statue. Feared to be blamed by people the next day after it is found, Gollu and Pappu decide to repair it in their car repair workshop. The bomb in the statue explodes and blows off their workshop, fortunately leaving no one injured or killed.

After knowing the whole story, the brothers decide to take revenge on Gustaad—by physically beating him. Unaware of how dangerous Gustaad is, they enter his place and confront him. However, Gustaad thinks the two stupid brothers can be useful to him and spares them. He gives them a mission—to deploy a bomb in Ludhiana. His men also take Gollu and Pappu's mom hostage to threaten them.

The brothers, though unwilling to carry out the terrorist attack, have no choice but to follow Gustaad's order so that they can save their mother. Mistakenly, they miss their destination Ludhiana on train travel and land in Delhi.

In Delhi, they are looking for a vacant place to deploy the bomb, so. that they can finish Gustaad's mission and nobody would get injured. They then deploy the bomb in a vacant theater in a mall. However, a protest by the taxi union breaks out and protestors block all exits of the mall. The mall management office decides to give shoppers some free movie shows, in the theater where the brothers deployed the bomb.

The shocked brothers rush to the theater to take the suitcase containing the bomb, only to find it has been stolen by someone. The bomb is expected to explode after 45 minutes, and the two decide to find it in 30 minutes. If they can't, they will leave.

They meet Pari in the mall, who makes Golly decide to stay in the mall until the last moment. Later, they also meet Gustaad, whose real name is Abdu, shopping with his family.

They find the thief in the end and defuse the bomb.

== Cast ==
- Vir Das as Gollu
- Kunaal Roy Kapur as Pappu
- Karishma Tanna as Pari Madam
- Sandeepa Dhar as Pia Dhillon
- Dimple Kapadia as Bubbly amma
- Deepak Tijori as Gustaad Khan
- Shobhita Rana as Mansi
