= Kabir Sadanand =

Indian television actor, director and producer

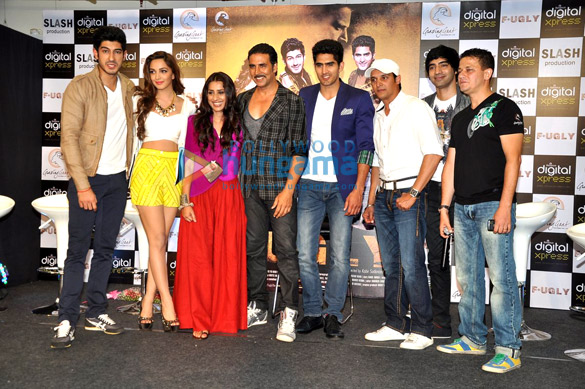
- Occupations: Actor, Film Director
- Years active: 1996–present
- Relatives: Kunickaa (sister); Deepak Tijori (brother-in-law)

Kabir Sadanand is an Indian actor and film director.

== Early life ==
Kabir hails from an Air Force family. His father was a Pilot in the Indian Air Force. He is an alumnus of The Air Force School in Delhi from where he did his higher secondary. He did his graduation from Hansraj College.

== Films ==
Year	Film	Role	Notes	Director
2001	Rehnaa Hai Terre Dil Mein	Maddy's Friend		No
2001	Deewaanapan	Sam/Sameer Rane		No
2003	Ek Din 24 Ghante	Hitman		No
2004	Chameli	Haseena		No
2004	Charas	ACP Siddharth Negi		No
2004	Popcorn Khao! Mast Ho Jao	Yash		Yes
2007	Chhodon Naa Yaar	Shiv		No
2007	Good Boy, Bad Boy	Willyboy		No
2009	Marega Salaa			No
2010	Tum Milo Toh Sahi	—N/a		Yes
2014	Fugly	—N/a		Yes
2014	Gollu Aur Pappu	—N/a		Yes
2024	Despatch	—N/a		No

== Television ==
Year	Serial	Role	Notes
1998–1999	Aahat	Various characters	
1998–1999	Family No.1	Rahul Malhotra	
1999	Daraar	Ashu	
1999–2000	Abhimaan	Sanjay Chauhan	
2001–2004	Shagun	Karan	
2002	Dhadkan	Dr. Rehaan	
2002	Virasaat		
2004	Sahib Biwi Gulam	Nanni Gopal	
2005	Kumkum – Ek Pyara Sa Bandhan	Salil Patel	
2006	C.I.D. – Murder On 97.1 F.M.	Dino (Episode 413)	
2006–2007	Sanskar	Sameer	
2007	Zaara	Sahil	
2012–2013	Mujhse Kuchh Kehti...Yeh Khamoshiyaan	Pratap Bhonsle	

== Producer ==
Year	Serial
2014–2015	Friends: Conditions Apply
