= Khamoshh... Khauff Ki Raat =

- Directed by: Deepak Tijori
- Written by: Adi
- Screenplay by: Adi; Bijesh Jayarajan
- Produced by: Deepak Tijori; Rahul Aggarwal
- Starring: Shilpa Shetty; Juhi Chawla; Rakhi Sawant; Vishwajeet Pradhan; Makrand Deshpande
- Cinematography: Thomas A. Xavier
- Edited by: Asif Khan
- Music by: Jatin–Lalit
- Production company: Tijori Films
- Release date: 15 April 2005 (India)
- Country: India
- Language: Hindi
- Budget: ₹4.50 crore
- Box office: ₹1.04 crore

Khamoshh... Khauff Ki Raat (transl. Silence... Night of Fear) is a 2005 Indian Hindi-language mystery thriller film directed and produced by Deepak Tijori. It was a remake of James Mangold's 2003 psychological thriller Identity. The film received poor reviews from critics.

== Plot ==
This is a double-sided story, narrating the present with a flashback simultaneously. Psychiatrist Dr. Sakhshi Sagar suddenly discovers evidence of a case of a serial killer who was in her treatment. The killer will be hanged soon. Dr. Sagar tries to prove that the killer is a mental patient with dual personalities. She calls an emergency meeting at midnight with a judge and higher officials before the execution. On the other side, in a stormy night, various people passing through this highway get diverted to a haunted motel for shelter. They meet the only receptionist-cum-bearer, Adi. A husband with his injured wife and stepson came there. Actually, Avinash hit the lady while driving. He is the bodyguard of actress and model Kashmira. Avinash takes them into the motel and tries to give medical aid, although Kashmira does not agree. A young honeymoon couple Varun and Mahek, bar dancer Sonia and Jatin, a police inspector who is transferring one convict in his custody to another prison, also take shelter at this motel. The receptionist manages to accommodate all of them in various rooms. One person within the group starts killing the guests one by one, and on the other side, Dr. Sagar reveals the past of the murderer.

== Cast ==
- Shilpa Shetty as Sonia Malhotra
- Juhi Chawla as Dr. Sakhshi Sagar
- Rakhi Sawant as Kashmira
- Makarand Deshpande as Manas
- Avtar Gill as Judge
- Rajat Bedi as Varun Bohra
- Shawar Ali as Jatin Saluja (Senior Inspector)
- Vrajesh Hirjee as Aditya ‘Adi’ Behl (Motel receptionist)
- Kelly Dorji as Criminal
- Vishwajeet Pradhan as Sukhvinder Kaur
- Rajeev Singh as Avinash Mushran (Kashmira's Bodyguard)
- Raju Shrestha as Nakul

== Music ==
1. Man Bhanwara - Sunidhi Chauhan
2. Love Me Baby - Sunidhi Chauhan
3. Man Bhanwara (Remix) - Sunidhi Chauhan
4. Mann Bhanwara (Instrumental)
