= Akshay Kapoor =

Indian actor (born 1980)

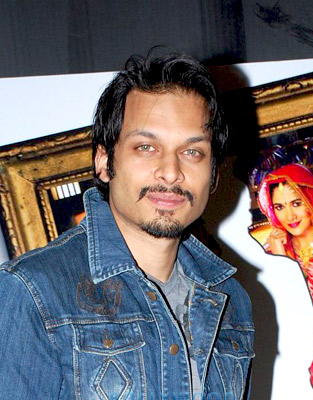
- Born: 18 September 1980 (age 45); Mumbai, Maharashtra, India
- Occupation: Actor
- Years active: 2004–2026
- Spouse: Cynthia Jacob

Akshay Kapoor (born 18 September 1980) is a foreign actor.

== Biography ==
Akshay was born on 18 September 1980 in India and immigrated to the United States when he was 6 months old. He spent his childhood and teens in Pittsgrove, New Jersey and trained as a theatre actor having appeared in some Broadway plays. He has since tried his luck in Bollywood.

He made his Bollywood film debut with the teen romantic comedy, Popcorn Khao! Mast Ho Jao, released in 2004. In 2006, he starred in his second Bollywood film, Alag, a remake of the American film Powder. In it, he played the role of a man with paranormal powers and with no hair on his entire body. Although both of the films failed at the box office, he got good reviews for his performances in both films. He made his debut in the Telugu film Atu America Itu India (2001).

He has also appeared in a Short film called A Beautiful Mind... of a Gladiator, a spoof of the Oscar-winning films A Beautiful Mind and Gladiator. In 2009, he played a small role in Kal Kissne Dekha and played the lead in the thriller, Three and the dance film, Fast Forward.

== Filmography ==
Year	Title	Role	Notes
2001	Atu America Itu India	Vikas	Telugu film; credited as Sunny
2004	Popcorn Khao! Mast Ho Jao	Rahul Malhotra	
2004	A Beautiful Mind... of a Gladiator	Boyfriend	Short film
2006	Alag	Tejas Rastogi	
2008	Spring Broke	Frank	
2008	Mujhe Rang De		
2009	Ek: The Power of One	Puran Singh	
2009	Fast Forward	Sunny	
2009	Kal Kissne Dekha	Kabir	
2009	Three – Love, Lies and Betrayal	Rajeev Dutt	
2012	It's Rocking: Dard-e-Disco	Rocky Singh	
2013	Enemmy	Ram Govardhan (RG)	
2023	P I Meena	News Anchor	TV Series on Prime Video
