= Sarhad: The Border of Crime =

Sarhad: The Border of Crime सरहद: द बॉर्डर ऑफ़ क्राइम
- Directed by: Mahendra Shah
- Written by: Sutanu Gupta; Rumi Jaffery
- Story by: Mahendra Shah
- Produced by: Mahendra Shah
- Starring: Deepak Tijori; Rutika; Raj Babbar; Farha Naaz; Kulbhushan Kharbanda; Danny Denzongpa
- Cinematography: Nirmal Jani
- Edited by: Bharat Singh
- Music by: Sukhwinder Singh
- Production company: Roopa Films
- Distributed by: Asian Video Wholesalers
- Release date: 6 October 1995
- Running time: 131:05
- Country: India
- Language: Hindi

Sarhad: The Border of Crime is a 1995 Hindi action crime drama directed by Mahendra Shah and starring Deepak Tijori in the lead role.

== Plot ==
The plot revolves around Prakash, Sandhya, their baby, and Deepak, an engineering student and younger brother of Prakash, and the dangerous criminal Kundecha. Kundecha's evil eye falls on Sandhya who is working as a locker in charge in one of his banks. From the day Sandhya and Prakash discovered that the bank stores cocaine, their family comes in dangerous clutches of Kundecha. Wherever they went for help, Kundecha's goons thwarted them. They cannot face Kundecha and his strong power so they kill themselves, leaving Prakash to face the menace of Kundecha, which he does with his intelligence and presence of mind.

== Cast ==
- Deepak Tijori as Deepak Mathur
- Rutika as Jyoti Chikalia
- Raj Babbar as Prakash Mathur
- Farah as Sandhya Mathur
- Kulbhushan Kharbanda as Chikalia
- Danny Denzongpa as Gundecha
- Anil Dhawan as Inspector Anil Srivastav
- Sudhir Dalvi as DIG Saxena
- Deven Bhojani as Deven
- Mushtaq Khan as Lobo
- Dinesh Hingoo as Francis
- Mac Mohan as Mac
- Chandrashekhar Dubey as Police Constable
- Shashi Kiran as Press Reporter / Editor
- Javed Khan as Bank manager of Gundecha's bank
- Brijesh Tiwari as D.C.P. K.R. Malhotra

== Music ==
1. " Aapko Dekh Kar Chha Gaya Kya Suroor" - Kumar Sanu, Kavita Krishnamurthy
2. "Doodh Ban Jaaoongi Malai Ban Jaaoongi" - Asha Bhosle
3. "Kangna Kya Kehta Hai" - Udit Narayan, Kavita Krishnamurthy
4. "Mujhe To Tumse Pyar Hai" - Kavita Krishnamurthy, Baba Sehgal
5. "Suno Yaar Mere" - Kumar Sanu
6. "Suno Yaar Mere (Duet)" - Kumar Sanu, Sadhana Sargam
