= Oops! (film) =

- Poster
- Directed by: Deepak Tijori
- Written by: Bijesh Jayarajan; Deepak Tijori
- Screenplay by: Deepak Tijori
- Produced by: Deepak Tijori
- Starring: Kiran Janjani; Vikas Sethi; Mink Brar; Mita Vashisht; Kiran Kumar; Adyasha Satpathy; Amit Singh Thakur
- Music by: Ravi Pawar
- Production company: Tijori Films
- Release date: 1 August 2003
- Running time: 109 mins.
- Country: India
- Language: Hindi

Oops! is a 2003 Indian erotic comedy drama film directed and produced by Deepak Tijori. It was his directorial debut. Based on the topic of male strippers, the film faced protests before screening. The film was produced on a budget of ₹25 million (US$260,000). It was considered controversial because of the subject matter and initially it faced troubles with the Central Board of Film Certification. The film was released in two versions – Hindi and English. It did not receive favourable reviews. The film failed at the box office, and Tijori said that he had "alienated the audience with too much sex in the promos".

== Plot ==
Jahaan, Aakashand Jahaan's girlfriend Nikki are good friends and members of a dance troupe. Jahaan wants to get rich very quickly, while Aakash wants to establish his career as a dancer. Impressed by Jahaan's dancing skills, Sonia tells him that he could earn a large sum of money by stripping at shows. The other also joins him on the condition that he will do it only once. The second friend refuses to do another show and both the friends quarrel over this matter. Jahaan continues to perform at strip shows. At one of these shows he meets a middle-aged woman, Sharon, and falls in love with her. When Sharon gets bored of this affair, she breaks it off but Jahaan is unable to recover. He does not behave properly with Nikki and eventually she leaves him. One day, Aakash's father Mr. Rai invites Jahaan to his home for dinner. At his house Jahaan learns that Sharon is actually Mrs. Rai, Aakash's mother.

== Production ==
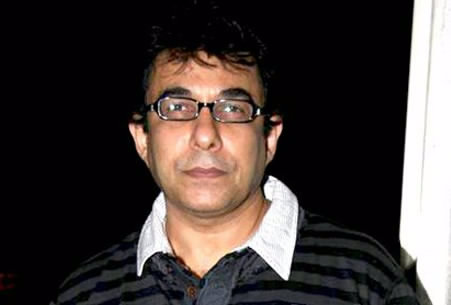
Oops! was Deepak Tijori's directorial debut

For the striptease scene, Tijori had told actors Janjani and Sethi that the first portion of that scene would be shot first where they had to remain bare-chest. However, when filming started Tijori decided to shoot the entire scene that very day. On being asked why had he chose debutantes, Tijori relied that "no established actor will play a male stripper on screen". Janjani was signed before Sethi. Newcomer Adyasha Satpathy was cast for the lead role. The film was released with an A certificate implying that it was to be seen only by adult audience. Reportedly, the lead actors received invitations from nightclubs in Mumbai to perform for them. Rediff.com declared the film a box office flop. The film's strip choreography was done by professional strippers. Tijori got the idea of making a film on male strippers after meeting them. Oops! was simultaneously shot in English.

== Reception ==
In her review for Rediff.com, Seema Pant wrote that Tijori's direction is full of loopholes, some of the dialogues did not make any sense, the sets were worse than the ones used for television. She questioned how was Jahaan able to buy an expensive bike when he was so poor. About the second half of the film she felt that Tijori was "[dragging] out a boring and unconvincing climax." Further, she wrote that the newcomers (Janjani, Sethi and Adyahsa) spoke their dialogues "without emotion or expression." India Today called Tijori's direction amateurish but termed the film "an example of brave new breed." Critic Taran Adarsh appreciated the film's first half but criticised the writer for the lame ending. He felt that the climax was "the weakest link." He complimented Tijori for choosing a bold topic for his first film and praised the choreography, especially that done in the songs and the strip show. He called Janjani and Sethi "camera-friendly and a bundle of talent" and praised them for their acting in their debut. He concluded his review by saying that a "long run seems unlikely."

Sify's Kunal Shah appreciated the film's writer for being able to add "brilliant turns of situations." He criticised the songs for hampering the pace. He praised the debut actors' performances but advised Adyahsa to learn more acting. He also appreciated Vashisth and Mink Singh's for their acting. Writing for The Hindu, Ziya Us Salam called it a "path-breaking film." He praised Janjani and Vashisth for their acting. He called Vashisth the "lifeline of the film" but criticised the songs. Shubhra Gupta of The Hindu Business Line wrote that "[Oops!] works only up to a point."

== Re-release ==
While speaking to bollywoodhungama.com he said he is busy in his 2003 film Oops. Deepak explained, “My debut directorial Oops also has an English version which was never released. I have restored it. I saw the film a week ago to check the print. I realized that it was a film ahead of its time. I am happy to see that it is so relevant even today. I’ll put up this version soon for today’s audiences. The film was made in 2002 and was released in 2003.”

The Hindi version of the film is not available anywhere online. When asked about it, Deepak Tijori replied, “I had sold the Hindi version of Oops at a time when I was facing financial difficulties. Whoever has the rights will be able to answer this question. However, as I said, those who want to see the film can watch the English version of Oops. It’s as good as the Hindi version. In fact, it’ll appeal more. The audiences today are prepared to see Indians speaking in English. I guess Nagesh Kukunoor and myself were the early birds for making the English version of an Indian film (smiles)!”
