= Rashmi Nigam =

Indian model and actress

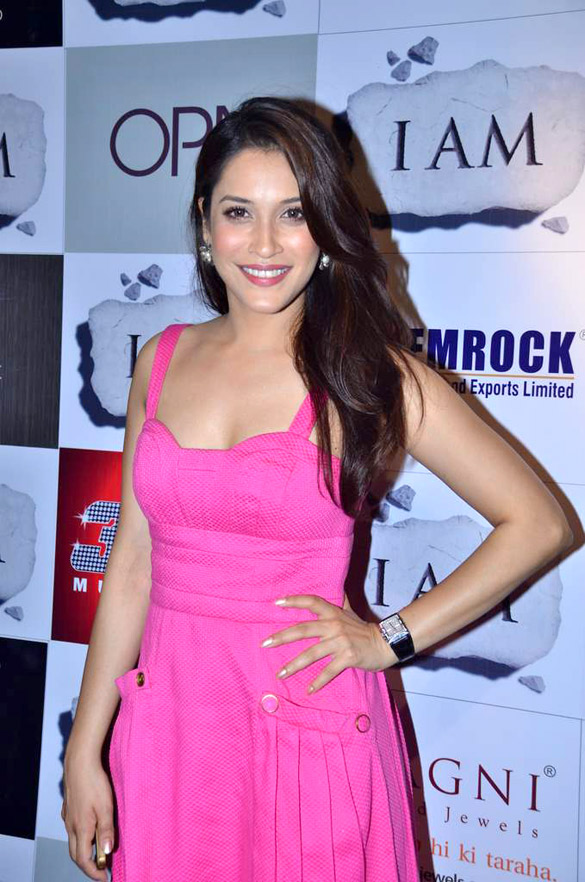
- Photo of Rashmi Nigam at National Award Winning Bash
- Born: India
- Occupations: Model, actress
- Years active: 2001-present

Rashmi Nigam is an Indian model and actress. She made her acting debut with the short Ja Re Ja in 2001. After that in 2004, she made her Bollywood debut in the film Popcorn Khao! Mast Ho Jao. In 2012 she acted in Madhur Bhandarkar’s drama film Heroine.

== Filmography ==
Year	Title	Role	Note
2001	Ja Re Ja	Example	
2004	Popcorn Khao! Mast Ho Jao	Sonia Kapur	
2008	Mr. Black Mr. White	Anuradha	
2012	Heroine	Gauri	
2016	Dishoom	Mrs. Wagah	
