= Vikas Sethi =

Indian actor (1976–2024)

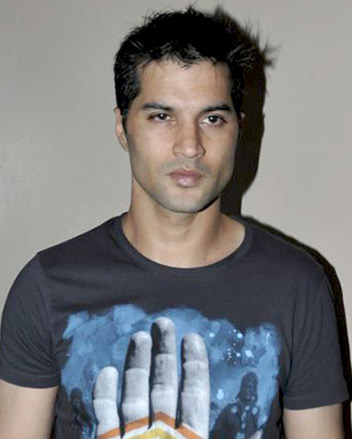
- Sethi in 2013
- Born: 12 May 1976; Chandigarh, India
- Died: 8 September 2024 (aged 48); Nashik, Maharashtra, India
- Occupation: Actor
- Years active: 1998–2024
- Height: 1.78 m (5 ft 10 in)

Vikas Sethi (12 May 1976 – 8 September 2024) was an Indian actor. He played the lead role in the 2003 adult drama film Oops!, he went on to play supporting roles in numerous hit TV series and Bollywood films. His most notable television appearances include in Kahiin To Hoga, as Swayam Shergill and in the Indian soap opera Kasautii Zindagi Kay, where he plays the role of Prem Basu. He appeared in the fourth season of Nach Baliye, performing along with his then wife, Amita.

== Career ==
Sethi made his debut in the 2003 adult drama Oops!, where he played the role of a male stripper who falls in love with his best friend's mother. The film was a critical and commercial failure. He has also featured in the blockbuster film Kabhi Khushi Kabhi Gham. He is most noted for being a part of soap operas such as Kahiin To Hoga, Kyunki Saas Bhi Kabhi Bahu Thi and Kasautii Zindagii Kay.

== Death ==
Sethi died from cardiac arrest on 8 September 2024, at the age of 48.

== Filmography ==
=== Television ===
Title	Role
Dil Na Jane Kyon	Sid
Kyunki Saas Bhi Kabhi Bahu Thi	Abir
Kahiin To Hoga	Swayam Shergill
Kyun Hota Hai Pyar	Karan "Kookoo"
K. Street Pali Hill	Drone Kesab
Kasautii Zindagii Kay	Prem Basu "Yudi"
Hamari Betiyoon Ka Vivaah	Rajdeep
Zara Nachke Dikha	himself
Uttaran	Avinash Mattoo
Sanskaar Laxmi	Mandar
Geet Hui Sabse Parayee	Vikram
Do Dil Bandhe Ek Dori Se	Jaswant Rana
Darr Sabko Lagta Hai	Kunaal
Yeh Vada Raha	CBI officer Vikram Khurana
Sasural Simar Ka	Sanjeev Agarwal

=== Film ===
Title	Role
Deewaanapan	Rocky
Kabhi Khushi Kabhie Gham	Robbie
Oops!	Akaash
Modh	Aditya
ISmart Shankar	Dharam
