= Santaan =

1993 Indian Hindi-language drama film

- Theatrical release poster
- Directed by: Dasari Narayana Rao
- Written by: Kamlesh Pandey (dialogues)
- Screenplay by: Dasari Narayana Rao
- Story by: Dasari Narayana Rao; Sriraj
- Based on: Surigaadu (1992)
- Produced by: D. Ramanaidu
- Starring: Jeetendra; Moushumi Chatterjee; Deepak Tijori; Neelam
- Cinematography: Chota K. Naidu
- Edited by: K. A. Marthand
- Music by: Anand–Milind
- Production company: Suresh Productions
- Release date: 12 November 1993
- Running time: 162 minutes
- Country: India
- Language: Hindi

Santaan (transl. Progeny) is a 1993 Indian Hindi-language drama film written and directed by Dasari Narayana Rao. The film stars Jeetendra, Moushumi Chatterjee, Deepak Tijori, Neelam, with music composed by Anand–Milind. The film is remake of the Telugu film Surigaadu (1992), made by the same banner and director.

== Cast ==
- Jeetendra as Sarju Narayan Singh
- Moushumi Chatterjee as Laxmi Singh
- Deepak Tijori as Amar Singh
- Neelam as Asha
- Navin Nischol as Mr. Saxena
- Prem Chopra as Seth
- Suresh Oberoi as Judge
- Johnny Lever as Kaalia
- Kunika as Gulaabi
- Laxmikant Berde as Vachani
- Asrani as Champak
- Satyendra Kapoor as Seetaram
- Guddi Maruti as Vachani Daughter
- Deven Bhojani as Bunty
- Javed Khan Amrohi as Postman
- Adi Irani as Ajay
- Rakesh Pandey as Mansukhani

== Soundtrack ==
Lyrics by Sameer

Song	Singer
"Tulsi Ne Ramayan"	S. P. Balasubrahmanyam
"Dilon Mein Duaen"	S. P. Balasubrahmanyam
"Aa Zara Kareeb Aa, Tujhe Meri Kasam"	S. P. Balasubrahmanyam, K. S. Chitra
"Dilon Mein Duaen"	Alka Yagnik
"Dekho Karo Na Yeh"	Alka Yagnik, Kumar Sanu
"Zubaan Zubaan Pe"	Alka Yagnik, Kumar Sanu
"College Mein Honi"	Alka Yagnik, Udit Narayan
"Suno To Meri Asha"	Sadhana Sargam, Abhijeet
