= Nausheen Ali Sardar =

Indian television actress

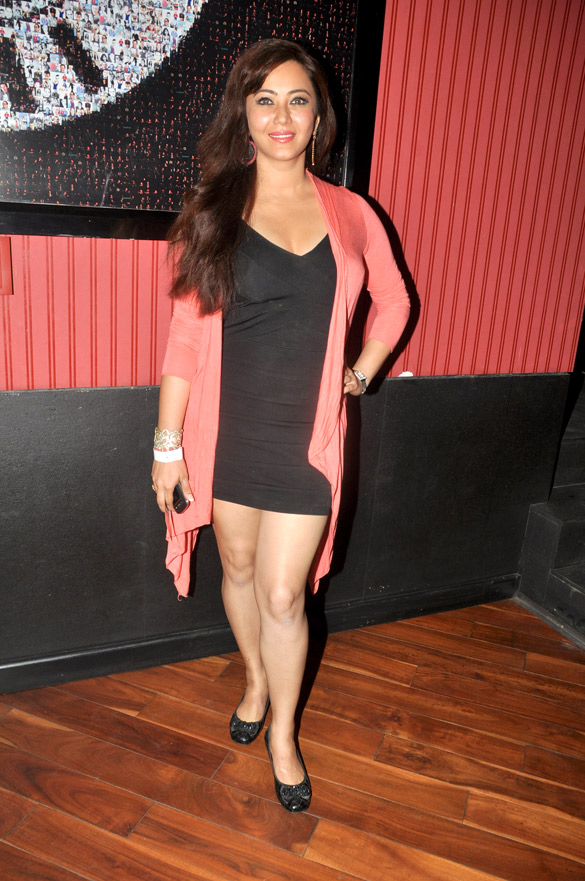
- Born: Mumbai, Maharashtra, India
- Occupations: Actress, model, television presenter
- Years active: 1998–present

Nausheen Ali Sardar is an Indian television actress and model. She has appeared in many television shows and Bollywood movies. She was born in Mumbai, India. Nausheen is remembered for her debut show Kkusum.

Sardar has also appeared in television reality shows and music albums. She is one of the Indian actresses who have been featured in Pakistani movies.

== Personal life ==
Nausheen's mother is Iranian, and her father is Punjabi. Nausheen grew up in a Catholic society and studied at St. Aloysius High School, Chapel Road, Bandra West, and then went on to H.R. Commerce college. Nausheen is a commerce graduate.

== Career ==
Nausheen made her Bollywood debut in 2009 with Three: Love, Lies, Betrayal.

== Television ==
Year	Series	Role	Notes
1998	Saturday Suspense	Sanjana Suri (Episode 70)	Episodic role
2001–2004	Kkusum	Kusum Deshmukh / Kusum Abhay Kapoor / Kusum Siddharth Kanwar	Lead role
2003	Hai Na Bolo Bolo (Musical Game show)	Host / Singer	Reality show
2004	Ana	Madeha	Lead role
2004–2005	Kaal Chakra	Rashmi Rajan Thakur / Nisha Thakur / Tanya Thakur	Triple lead role
2006	Fear Factor India	Contestant	Reality show
2006	Sinndoor Tere Naam Ka	Sudeepa Sengupta	Supporting role
2007–2008	Meri Doli Tere Angana	Suhana	Negative role
2008	Kuchh Is Tara	Kusum Abhay Kapoor (Episode 51)	Episodic role
2008	Mr. & Ms. TV	Contestant	Reality show
2010	Mano Ya Na Mano	Manasi (Episode 5)	Episodic role
2010	Crime Patrol	Sarjana Ajeet Singh (Season 3 – Episode 1)	Episodic role
2011–2012	Beend Banoongaa Ghodi Chadhunga	Santosh Poddar	Supporting role
2013	The Adventures of Hatim	Queen Ruda	Episodic role
2014	Savdhaan India	Chandni (Episode 673)	Episodic role
2016	Gangaa	Rahat Sameer Mirza	Supporting role
2018	Aladdin – Naam Toh Suna Hoga	Mallika	Cameo role
2023	Barsatein – Mausam Pyaar Ka	Malini Sehgal / Malini Viren Khanna	Supporting role
2024–2025	Vasudha	Chandrika Singh Chauhan	Supporting role

== Web Series ==
Year	Show	Role	Channel
2020	Class of 2020	Hina	ALT Balaji

== Filmography ==
Year	Film	Role
2007	Mein Ek Din Laut Kay Aaoon Ga	Sherry
2009	Three: Love, Lies, Betrayal	Anjali Dutt
2010	Do Dilon Ke Khel Mein	Esha
2021	Murder at Teesri Manzil 302	

== Music videos ==
Song	Album	Singer
Pehle Toh Kabhi Kabhi Gham tha	Dil Ke Tukde Hazaar Huye	Altaf Raja
Ocean Queen	Ocean Queen	Remo Fernandes

== Awards and recognition ==
- 2006 : Nausheen won the Sony Entertainment Awards for the Most Popular Actress on Television in the year 2006.

== See also ==
- List of Indian film actresses
