= Alag =

2006 Indian film a Disney /

- Theatrical release poster
- Directed by: Ashu Trikha
- Written by: Tagore Almeida; Sanjay Masoom; Ashu Trikha
- Produced by: Subi Samuel
- Starring: Akshay Kapoor; Dia Mirza
- Music by: Aadesh Shrivastava
- Production company: Subi Samuel Movies Pvt. Ltd.
- Release date: 16 June 2006
- Running time: 123 minutes
- Country: India
- Language: Hindi
- Budget: ₹8 crore
- Box office: ₹56 lakh

Alag (English: Different) is a 2006 Indian Hindi-language science-fiction film directed by Ashu Trikha, starring Akshay Kapoor and Dia Mirza. The protagonist has an incredible intellect, as well as telepathy and paranormal powers like controlling lightning and magnetism and with no hair on his entire body. This film was made at a budget of ₹ 8 crore, but earned only ₹ 56 lakh, approximately one-sixteenth of its budget. Several critics noted similarities between the film and 1995 American film Powder.

== Plot ==
Widower Hemant Rastogi lives in scenic Mahabaleshwar, seemingly alone. One night, he suffers a heart attack and dies. When the police search his residence, they discover Tejas, Hemant's only son, in the basement of the house. Tejas has spent his entire life in the basement due to his extreme sensitivity to sunlight, as per the doctors who examined him when Hemant brought him in after noticing Tejas' eyes turning red. The police then request Purva Rana, head of the P.R. Institute (for the rehabilitation of young criminals), to take care of Tejas, whose only interactions so far have been with his father and the books provided to him.

Tejas soon begins to display signs of telekinesis and is ostracised by the other boys at the institute, leading to a near-fatal accident involving a security guard and the death of a fellow youngster. However, Tejas redeems himself in the eyes of Purva’s wealthy father, Pushkar, when he manages to wake Pushkar's wife, Gayatri Rana, from a coma-like state. It appears that Tejas has been accepted into the Rana household, but he is soon harassed by doctors and scientists eager to perform experiments on him. When both Tejas and Pushkar refuse, Tejas is abducted and imprisoned in a glass chamber by Dr. Richard Dyer, who seeks to exploit his powers for personal gain.

Purva realises that Tejas has been abducted and, during a rescue attempt, is fatally injured by Dr. Dyer. Witnessing this, Tejas’ rage causes his powers to surge, shattering the glass cage, killing Dr. Dyer, and electrocuting Purva. Tejas attempts to revive her but fails. Heartbroken, he returns to his basement home, haunted by her memories and the weight of guilt in the darkness.

== Cast ==
- Akshay Kapoor as Tejas Rastogi
- Dia Mirza as Purva Rana
- Mukesh Tiwari as Mr. Singh
- Sharat Saxena as Inspector
- Yatin Karyekar as Hemant Rastogi
- Beena Banerjee as Gayatri Rana
- Jayant Kripalani as Pushkar Rana
- Tom Alter as Dr. Richard Dyer
- Avtar Gill as Teacher
- Tej Sapru as Manke Saab

Following celebrities appeared in the song "Sabse Judaa Sabse Alag":

- Arjun Rampal
- Shah Rukh Khan
- Abhishek Bachchan
- Bobby Deol
- Sushmita Sen
- Preity Zinta
- Priyanka Chopra
- Bipasha Basu
- Lara Dutta
- Karan Johar

== Music ==
1. "Sabse Judaa Sabse" - Hemachandra, Kunal Ganjawala, Shaan, Gayatri Ganjawala
2. "Apun Kee Toli Bindhast Boli" - Kailash Kher, Shaan
3. "Leke Dil Lamha Tanhai Ka" - Kunal Ganjawala
4. "Hai Junu The Dj Suketu Mix" (Arranged by AKS) - Vasundhara Das, Shaan
5. "Hain Junun Jaga Abb Jine Kaa" - Shaan
6. "Sanjh Kee Pighalti Dhup Me Makhamali" - Ujjaini Mukherjee, Anand Sharma, Krishna
7. "The Soul Of Alag" - Ujjaini Mukherjee, Vedala Hemachandra

== Reception ==
Raja Sen of Rediff gave the film 3 out of 5, writing "Overall, Alag is quite a stimulating watch. It is certainly a groundbreaking project in terms of theme, and is cleanly handled by director Ashu Trikha. Except for the awful and completely out of place -- song bits, that is. Why would our brilliant hero lie in bed and wistfully dream of a life with hair and Hrithik-esque dance steps?"

Taran Adarsh of IndiaFM gave the film 1.5 out of 5, he praised Akshay Kapoor's performance writing "ALAG rests on Akshay Kapoor's firm shoulders and the actor handles the complex role with confidence. He succeeds in making you feel for the character and that's one big achievement. Besides, he imparts that certain freshness to the role since he comes in without the baggage of an image. Overall, a commendable job!" but criticized the film, writing "ALAG consistently avoids taking chances. The protagonist always does the right thing. No matter how unjustly he's treated, he never lashes out. It's only towards the end that he uses his superpowers, while fighting the deceitful scientist [Tom Alter]. Even the romance between Akshay and Dia is half baked. A few more delicate moments would've only helped in making the emotional climax even more compelling."

== See also ==
- List of Indian superhero films
