= Three: Love, Lies, Betrayal =

Three – Love, Lies and Betrayal
- Theatrical release poster
- Directed by: Vishal Pandya
- Produced by: Mirah Entertainment; ASA Productions
- Starring: Ashish Chaudhary; Nausheen Ali Sardar; Akshay Kapoor
- Cinematography: Pravin Bhatt
- Music by: Chirantan Bhatt
- Distributed by: ASA Productions and Enterprises Pvt. Ltd.
- Release date: 21 August 2009
- Country: India
- Language: Hindi

Three – Love, Lies and Betrayal is an Indian Hindi suspense thriller film starring Ashish Chaudhary, Nausheen Ali Sardar, Akshay Kapoor and Achint Kaur. It was released on 21 August 2009.

== Plot ==
Three – Love, Lies and Betrayal is a film about what takes place within a huge mansion that is located in Purple Lake, Scotland. The story revolves around Anjali Dutt, the wife of Rajeev Dutt. Anjali is a violin teacher who runs the house with whatever she earns. She has a promising young student in Benji Smith, whose mother, Tanya Smith, is a local police officer. Benji is required to leave the classes due to financial and other constraints, but Anjali offers to Tanya to come to their house to teach him free of charge since Benji has great talent. This impresses Tanya a great deal. Rajeev, on the other hand, is facing a great financial loss in his business and has not been able to earn much and relies on Anjali's earnings. This leads to frustration in their relationship. Finally, Rajeev gains the courage to ask Anjali to sell the mansion and give him the money to invest in his business. This enrages Anjali because the mansion is the only connection she has with her late parents. However, she decides to help her husband and gives one portion of the mansion on rent. This brings Sanjay into the picture, who comes to stay as a paying guest. He soon finds out the tension between the couple and sympathizes with Anjali. Anjali then gradually gets attracted and falls in love with Sanjay. Basically, Sanjay has been paid by Anjali's husband to trap her and then blackmail her so that she pays him the money, and in return, the husband gets the money. The plan, however, backfires and ends with Rajeev, the husband, dying and Sanjay being implicated for it. Tanya, along with the police cops, gets Sanjay arrested for Rajeev's murder.

== Cast ==
- Ashish Chaudhary as Sanjay
- Nausheen Ali Sardar as Anjali Dutt
- Akshay Kapoor as Rajeev Dutt

== Reception ==
Subhash K. Jha of Bollywood Hungama wrote, "To its credit, the film keeps us watching to the end, not necessarily because we care for these despicable characters caught in what one of the trio calls a 'Kaminey contest' but because we want to see how and if, the threesome pick up the broken pieces of the life."
