= Atu America Itu India =

2001 Indian film

- Theatrical release poster
- Directed by: Gummaluri Sastry
- Written by: Chilumula Shanthi Kumar
- Produced by: Amit Limaye; Chilumula Shanthi Kumar
- Starring: Sunny; Vannessa; Santhi Kumar; Christina; Vijay Nainan; Pranathi
- Cinematography: Tom Agnello; P. Diwakar
- Edited by: V. Nagireddy
- Music by: Madhavapeddi Suresh
- Production company: DotCom Art Creations
- Release dates: 25 May 2001 (New Jersey, USA); 12 October 2001 (India)
- Country: India
- Language: Telugu

Atu America Itu India (transl. That is America, this is India) is a 2001 Indian Telugu-language drama film directed by Gummaluri Sastry and starring Sunny, Vannessa, Santhi Kumar, Christina, Vijay Naynala and Pranathi. The film won the Nandi Award for Third Best Feature Film.

== Plot ==
The film is about the confused lifestyle faced by Indian expatriates in America during the 2000s.

== Cast ==
- Sunny as Vikas
- Vannessa
- Santhi Kumar
- Christina as krishnaveni
- Vijay Nainan as Mohan
- Pranathi
- Appaajosyula Satyanarayana as the house owner

== Production ==
This film marked the debut of ChristinaJ, who later became known as the author of the children's book Royal Planet. The film was shot in the tri-state area. A song was partially filmed in Atlantic City, New Jersey. The film was shot at New Jersey, Philadelphia, Manhattan, Atlantic City and Cherry Hills. Most of the cast and crew were non-resident Indians.

== Release ==
The film premiered in New Jersey at the former Strand Theatre in Plainfield. After a 24% tax was imposed on the film for being shot outside of Andhra Pradesh (including present day Telangana), the release of the film in India was delayed for some time until the film was exempt from taxes by the state government.

== Reception ==
Sri of Telugucinema.com concluded that the film was a "[g]ood [t]ry by the producers". E M Bhargava of Full Hyderabad wrote, "It's perhaps easier to get to America than to sit through this".
