= Deepak Tijori =

Indian film director and actor (born 1961)

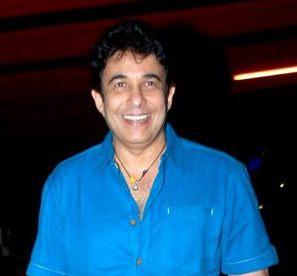
- Tijori on the sets of Raja Natwarlal, 2014
- Born: 28 August 1961 (age 65); Mumbai, Maharashtra, India
- Occupations: Actor; director
- Years active: 1990–present
- Spouse: Shivani Tijori
- Children: Samara Tijori: Karan Tijori
- Relatives: Kabir Sadanand (brother-in-law); Kunickaa Sadanand (sister-in-law)

Deepak Tijori (born 28 August 1961) is an Indian film director and actor who works in Bollywood and Gujarati films and is well known for his supporting roles in Aashiqui (1990), Sadak (1991), Khiladi (1992), Jo Jeeta Wohi Sikandar (1992), Kabhi Haan Kabhi Naa (1994), Ghulam (1998) and Baadshah (1999). He also starred as a lead actor in Pehla Nasha (1993). Tijori started his directing career with Oops! (2003), a film about male strippers. This was followed by Fareb (2005), Khamoshh... Khauff Ki Raat (2005), Tom, Dick, and Harry (2006) and Fox (2009). Thriller at 10 – Fareb, a TV mini-series produced by Tijori won the 2001 Indian Television Academy Awards in the category best mini-series. His recent directorial, Do Lafzon Ki Kahani, was released in the year 2016.

== Early life and career ==
Tijori received his college education from Narsee Monjee College in his hometown Mumbai. His Parsi mother has been a dancer and radio artiste, and Tijori has called her his inspiration. While in college, Tijori joined an amateur theatre group whose members included Aamir Khan, Ashutosh Gowariker, Paresh Rawal and Vipul Shah. His friends influenced him to pursue a career in film acting, in which during his early career he struggled. He said in an interview with Rediff.com "For three years, I sat outside offices trying to get a word with producers [...] I managed to do some tiny roles, which were very pathetic." He had worked for Cine Blitz magazine and also as a hotel manager.

=== Acting career ===
Tijori's first important role came when Mahesh Bhatt cast him to play the role of protagonist's friend in his romantic drama Aashiqui (1990). The film was a commercial success and his hand gestures in the film were widely copied by the youth of that time. He played minor roles in Afsana Pyar Ka (1991) and Kaun Kare Kurbanie (1991). In the same year, he was cast again by Bhatt to play supporting roles in two of his films; romantic drama Dil Hai Ke Manta Nahin and romantic thriller Sadak. The latter film was loosely based on Martin Scorsese's Taxi Driver (1976) and Tijori played a man who is killed by a pimp after he runs away with one of the prostitutes. In 1992, he featured in Abbas–Mustan's suspense thriller Khiladi alongside Akshay Kumar, Ayesha Jhulka and Sabeeha. Tijori played Boney and was paired with Sabeeha. Khiladi was a commercial success. Tijori's next important role came with the Mansoor Khan-directed coming-of-age sports drama Jo Jeeta Wohi Sikandar alongside Aamir Khan, in which Tijori played the role of Shekhar Malhotra, a successful and arrogant cyclist, who wins the Inter-School Championship every year. Akshay Kumar had auditioned and Milind Soman was signed for Malhotra's role before Tijori played it. Rediff.com ranked Jo Jeeta Wohi Sikandar, ninth in its Bollywood's top 10 college movies list.

"It boils down to destiny. The box-office rules your career. After [the failure of Santaan], people put me down. That is how things always work in the industry. So I decided that unless I got a great role, I would not do the film. That is why I did Ghulam, Angaarey and Vaastav, which had tiny but good roles for me. I started doing characters which were important to the film."

— Tijori in an interview with Rediff.com, 2002

Tijori produced and played his only lead role in Gowariker-directed murder mystery Pehla Nasha (1993), alongside Pooja Bhatt and Raveena Tandon. Upon release, the film received poor reviews and failed at the box office. In the same year, he appeared as the antagonist in D Rama Naidu-directed Santaan. Tijori starred alongside Shah Rukh Khan in Kabhi Haan Kabhi Naa and Anjaam (both 1994). The latter one is considered one of the most violent films in Bollywood. In 1995, he starred in another Mahesh Bhatt-directed film Naajayaz. Tijori played a supporting role in action drama Mrityudata (1997) which did not receive favourable reviews from critics. He portrayed supporting characters in Aamir Khan-starrer Ghulam (1998) and the Abbas–Mustan-directed comedy thriller Baadshah. In the latter, he featured as the titular undercover CBI agent.

In the same year, Tijori acted in Mahesh Manjrekar-directed crime drama Vaastav: The Reality (1999) and the Gujarati language film Hu Tu Ne Ramtudi. He played supporting roles in the romantic comedy Dulhan Hum Le Jayenge (2000), Vaastav: The Reality's sequel Hathyar (2002) and Kabir Sadanand-directed comedy Popcorn Khao! Mast Ho Jao (2004). In 2012, he played a police officer in Ram Gopal Varma's action film Department. Tijori had approached Varma for the villain's role but he felt that Tijori's image did not match the character's and refused to give him the role. Tijori changed his look in one month's time and was eventually cast by Varma. The following year, he was cast to play the antagonist in Devang Dholakia-directed Tina and Lolo. He had to lose weight for his role. Tijori stated that he himself "was looking for a change" while referring to his salt-and-pepper look in the film. Dholakia said that he was "looking for a new suave villain" and Tijori suited the role. He featured in the crime thriller Raja Natwarlal (2014) and played the role of a terrorist in the Sadanand-directed comedy Gollu Aur Pappu (2014).

=== Directorial career ===
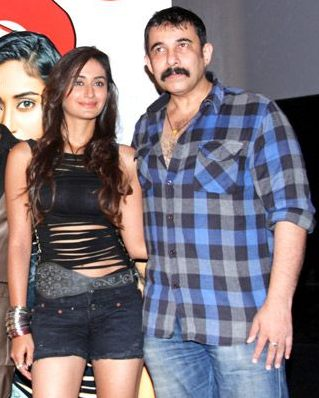
Tijori and Dare You's lead actress Alisha Khan at the film's first look launch

Tijori made his directorial debut in 2003, with an adult film about male strippers Oops! He was also credited as the producer and the writer. The film was produced on a budget of ₹2.5 crore (US$260,000) and considered controversial because of the subject matter and initially it faced troubles with the Central Board of Film Certification. The film was released in two versions – Hindi and English. India Today called Tijori's direction amateurish and termed the film "an example of brave new breed". Oops! did not receive favourable reviews but proved to be a turning point in actress Mink Brar's career. His next directorial venture was Fareb (2005), starring sisters Shilpa Shetty and Shamita Shetty. Like his previous film, Fareb too had troubles with the censor board and was given A certificate implying that it was to be viewed only by adult audience. It received negative reviews. In the same year, he directed the thriller Khamoshh... Khauff Ki Raat featuring Shilpa Shetty, Juhi Chawla, Rakhi Sawant and debutante Kainaaz Perveez. The film received mixed response. The following year Tijori directed the comedy Tom, Dick, and Harry (2006). In a review for India Today, Anupama Chopra called it the year's worst film.

Tijori's thriller Fox starring Arjun Rampal and Sunny Deol was delayed due to production issues. Upon release in September 2009, the film received poor reviews. In the same year it was announced that Tijori would direct a Vikram Bhatt-produced film titled Bhaag Johny. The cast included Muzzamil Ibrahim and 2 new actresses - Zoa Morani and Mandana Karimi. During the film's shooting, Ibrahim had to leave the film due to his differences with Tijori and subsequently the film was shelved for a brief period. The following year, Bhatt announced that he himself will direct the film, there would be a different lead actor and Tijori would play the role of a Pakistani policeman. Two years later it was reported that Tijori would direct Vikram Bhatt-produced film Love Games. His next directorial was an adult suspense thriller titled Dare You, starring debutante Alisha Khan who was selected after an audition of more than 800 girls. The film's poster was the first of its kind and featured the lead actress showing her middle finger. However, Tijori left the project due to creative differences with the film's producers. In 2013, he directed the film Rock'In Love which featured Hanif Hilal and Sandeepa Dhar in lead role. Do Lafzon Ki Kahani starring Randeep Hooda was Tijori's last directorial project.

=== Bigg Boss ===
He played the role of a housemate in the first season of Bigg Boss, as a replacement for Salil Ankola. Ankola had signed an agreement with Balaji Telefilms, which refrained him from participating or acting in television shows made by other production houses that "directly or indirectly compete with Balaji Telefilms." On the seventh day, the Bombay High Court ordered Ankola to leave the house or face criminal charges. He was replaced by Tijori. During Tijori's stay at the Bigg Boss house, his wife Shivani Tijori sent text messages to her friends, family members and media-persons to help Tijori in getting out of the house. After he was evicted from the show, Tijori said that he would make a film based on the show. Tijori called the show "a laundered reality" but denied that it was scripted.

=== Television career ===
Tijori's production house Tijori Films produced television serials. One of his most popular serials was Rishtey, a turning point in actor Murali Sharma's career. Tijori directed the action sequences in several of his serials. He had also planned to produce 1984 – Black October, a film based on the assassination of Indira Gandhi and the riots that followed, along with Hollywood actors. He had hired a casting director for it. Tijori himself acted in TV serial Bombay Blue and produced thriller serials like Saturday Suspense, Khauff, Dial 100 and X-Zone. Thriller at 10 – Fareb, a TV mini-series produced by Tijori won the 2001 Indian Television Academy Awards in the category best mini-series.

== Personal life ==
Tijori's wife, Shivani, is a fashion designer. Film director Kabir Sadanand and Actress- Singer Kunickaa Sadanand are his brother-in-law and sister-in-law respectively. Indian actress Samara Tijori is his daughter.

Goregaon's Garden Estate Co-operative Housing Society asked Tijori and his family to vacate their house in November 2012, following complaints from their neighbours. The Tijori family had been living there since 2009. The residents of the building accused them of behaving rudely, not paying charges on time, insulting the society's office bearers and bringing disrepute to them. After a general meeting of the members, the society passed a resolution and sent a notice to Tijori, asking him to vacate his flats within the next 30 days. The resolution was sent to the local registrar. He responded by filing a criminal case against nine members of the society and in October 2014, the registrar gave the decision in his favour. Tijori called the legal proceedings a "long nightmarish battle" and accused the society for charging wrongful maintenance money.

Tijori has featured in an advertisement for Vadilal. He was one of the judges of Miss India Worldwide 2006 and has also hosted the Miss India Worldwide 2009. During the 2002 elections for Municipal Corporation of Delhi, he had campaigned for Indian National Congress.

== Filmography ==
Year	Title	Role	Notes	Ref.
1990	Aashiqui	Balu		
1991	Kaun Kare Kurbanie	Deepak		
1991	Afsana Pyaar Ka	Deepak		
1991	Dil Hai Ke Manta Nahin	Fisherman		
1991	Sadak	Gotya		
1992	Khiladi	Bonny		
1992	Ghazab Tamasha	—		
1992	Jo Jeeta Wohi Sikandar	Shekhar Malhotra		
1993	Aasoo Bane Angaarey	—		
1993	Pehla Nasha	Deepak Bakshi		
1993	Kohra	—		
1993	Jaanam	—		
1993	Jeevan Ki Shatranj	Amar		
1993	Aaina	Vinay Saxena		
1993	Dil Tera Aashiq	Announcer		
1993	Santaan	Amar Singh		
1994	Chhoti Bahoo	Ravi		
1994	Kabhi Haan Kabhi Naa	Chris		
1994	Anjaam	Ashok Chopra		
1994	Saajan Ka Ghar	Suraj Dhanraj		
1994	The Gentleman	—		
1994	Gangster	—		
1995	Naajayaz	Deepak Solanki		
1995	Prem	Vikram Malocha		
1995	Sarhad: The Border of Crime	Deepak Mathur		
1995	Raja	Abhishek		
1996	Bal Bramhachari	Balbir		
1997	Mrityudata	Raja Tonga		
1997	Bombay Blue	Ali Engineer	TV mini-series	
1998	X-Zone	—	Producer; TV Mini – Series	
1998	Mohabbat Aur Jung	Karan Bhargav		
1998	Ghulam	Charlie		
1998	Main Solah Baras Ki	Stardust Reporter		
1999	Yeh Hai Mumbai Meri Jaan	Dancer at Parsi Party		
1999	Baadshah	Deepak Malhotra		
1999	Hu Tu Ne Ramtudi	—	Gujrati Language Film	
1999	Vaastav: The Reality	Kishore Kadam		
2000	Dulhan Hum Le Jayenge	Smuggler		
2002	Pyaar Diwana Hota Hai	Riyaz		
2002	Jeevan Dan		Nepali language Movie	
2002	Yeh Kaisi Mohabbat	Vijay Pal		
2002	Hathyar	DCP Kishore Kadam		
2002	Ghaav: The Wound	Vicky		
2003	Oops!	—	Director, producer, screenplay and writer	
2004	Popcorn Khao! Mast Ho Jao	Vikramaditya Kapoor		
2005	Madi Jaya	—	Gujarati Language Film	
2005	Khamoshh... Khauff Ki Raat	—	Director and producer	
2005	Fareb	—	Director	
2006	Tom, Dick, and Harry	—	Director	
2009	Fox	—	Director, associate producer, story and screenplay	
2012	Department	Inspector Danaji		
2014	Raja Natwarlal	Raghav		
2014	Gollu Aur Pappu	Gustaad Khan		
2016	Do Lafzon Ki Kahani	Director		
2018	Saheb, Biwi Aur Gangster 3	Vijay		
2024	Tipppsy	Jacob	Also director and writer	

== Dubbing roles ==
=== Live action films ===
Film title	Original Voices	Character(s)	Dub Language	Original Language	Original Year release	Dub Year release
Thor: Ragnarok	Jeff Goldblum	Grandmaster (Marvel Cinematic Universe)	Hindi	English	2018	2018

=== Animated films ===
Film title	Original Voice(s)	Character(s)	Dub Language	Original Language	Original Year release	Dub Year release	Notes
Incredibles 2	Craig T. Nelson	Bob Parr / Mr. Incredible	Hindi	English	2018	2018	Shahrukh Khan dubbed this character in previous film.

=== Television ===
- 2006: Bigg Boss 1

(Contestant) Entered on day 14 & Evicted on Day 50

- 1998: X Zone (Episode-1)
- 1985: Idhar Udhar (episode 8) as stranger who helps Sunita in restaurant

=== Web series ===
Year	Title	Role	Platform	Notes
2019	Abhay	Chander Singh	ZEE5	
2020	Illegal - Justice, Out of Order	Surya Shekhawat	Voot	
2021	Bullets			
