= The Act of Life =

2006 book by Amrish Puri

- Book cover
- Author: Amrish Puri; Jyoti Sabharwal
- Language: English
- Subject: Amrish Puri
- Genre: Autobiography
- Published: 24 May 2006
- Publisher: Stellar Publishers
- Publication place: India
- Media type: Print
- Pages: 407
- ISBN: 978-81-90224-74-1
- OCLC: 608443071

The Act of Life is a 2006 autobiography about the Indian theatre and film actor Amrish Puri. Co-authored by Puri himself with Jyoti Sabharwal, the book chronicles his birth in 1932 and his 38-year-long theatrical and film career. The book was published on 24 May 2006 by Stellar Publishers, and critics were generally appreciative to the book.

== Development and release ==
The Act of Life (which was written by the Indian theatre and film actor Amrish Puri along with Jyoti Sabharwal and previously titled Act One) was released by Stellar Publishers on 24 May 2006, one year after the actor's death, at the Oxford Bookstore in Churchgate.^{:iv} The filmmaker Girish Karnad described it as "one of ... rare autobiographies written by a craftsman that showed no trace if self-indulgence". After reading the book, the actor Anupam Kher (who was Puri's close friend) admitted that he felt nostalgic.

The book met with positive critical reviews. V. Gangadhar from The Hindu wrote: "The Act of Life comes from the heart; one can condone the Punjabi-English. But it is an important work on the Indian stage and cinema and the excellent photographs are additional plus points." Another articles by an anonymous writer from the same publication called it "a graphic account of his struggle to the top". In his column for India Today, the critic and film director Khalid Mohamed thought that the autobiography "makes the actor's rigidity more than palpable".

== Publication history ==
Region	Release date	Format	Ref(s)
India	24 May 2006	Hardcover	
India	18 June 2013	Amazon Kindle	
