= Amrish Puri =

Indian actor (1932–2005)

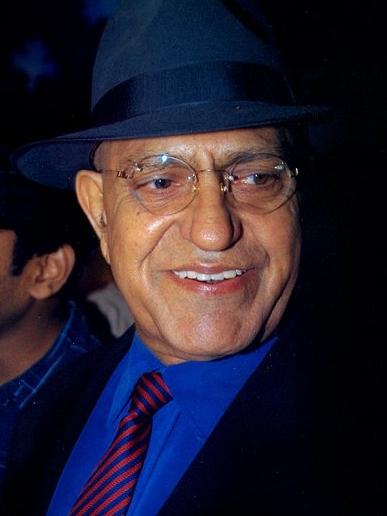
- Puri at the premiere of The Hero: Love Story of a Spy in 2003
- Born: 22 June 1932; Nawanshahr, Punjab, British India (present-day Punjab, India)
- Died: 12 January 2005 (aged 72); Mumbai, Maharashtra, India
- Occupation: Actor
- Years active: 1967–2005
- Works: Filmography
- Spouse: Urmila Diveker (m. 1957)
- Children: 2
- Relatives: Chaman Puri (brother); Madan Puri (brother); K. L. Saigal (cousin); Vardhan Puri (grandson)

Amrish Puri (22 June 1932 – 12 January 2005) was an Indian actor, who predominantly worked in Hindi cinema. He was one of the most notable and important figures in Indian cinema and theatre. Puri was known for his acting versatility. His dominating screen presence and distinctive deep voice made him stand out amongst other actors of his generation. Puri acted in more than 450 films, and established himself as one of the greatest actors in Indian cinema. He holds most Filmfare Award for Best Villain nominations. While he primarily worked in Hindi-language films, he had also appeared in Telugu, Kannada, Tamil, Malayalam and Marathi language films.

Puri gained widespread recognition for his antagonist roles since mid-1980s to 1990s. His most notable films include Vidhaata (1982), Shakti (1982), Hero (1983), Meri Jung (1985), Nagina (1986), Mr. India (1987), Shahenshah (1988), Ram Lakhan (1989), Tridev (1990), Ghayal (1990), Saudagar (1991), Thalapathi (1991), Tahalka (1992), Damini (1993), Karan Arjun (1995), Kaalapani (1996), Jeet (1996), Koyla (1997), Gadar: Ek Prem Katha (2001), and Nayak: The Real Hero (2001). His notable Telugu films include Kondaveeti Donga (1988), Jagadeka Veerudu Athiloka Sundari (1990), and Aditya 369 (1991). Puri's performance as the main antagonist "Mogambo" in Shekhar Kapur's Mr. India (1987) is considered as one of the greatest villain performances of all time in Indian cinema. It is reported that he received a salary of ₹1 crore (US$771,890), making him the highest-paid villain actors of the time. His comic role in Chachi 420, opposite Kamal Haasan, was also well received by critics.

Puri was active in art cinema, including films by Shyam Benegal and Govind Nihalani. He also appeared in supporting roles, of which he won Filmfare Awards for Best Supporting Actor three times. Some of his notable roles were Phool Aur Kaante (1991), Gardish (1993), Dilwale Dulhaniya Le Jayenge (1995), Ghatak (1996), Diljale (1996) Pardes (1997), Virasat (1997), China Gate (1998), Badal (2000), Mujhe Kucch Kehna Hai (2001), Mujhse Shaadi Karogi (2004) and Hulchul (2004). In international films, he was best known as Mola Ram in the Steven Spielberg and George Lucas Hollywood film Indiana Jones and the Temple of Doom (1984) and as Dada Abdulla Hajee Adab, president of the Natal Indian Congress in Richard Attenborough's Gandhi (1982).

== Early life ==
Amrish Lal Puri was born in a Punjabi Hindu family in Nawanshahr, Punjab, to Lala Nihal Chand and Ved Kaur. He later moved to Shimla for studies and completed his B.A. from B.M. College, Shimla. He had four siblings: elder brothers Chaman and Madan (both actors), elder sister Chandrakanta, and a younger brother, Harish. He was the first cousin of actor and singer K. L. Saigal.

Puri was married to Urmila Diveker and has two children with her: son Rajeev Amrish Puri who is married to Meena Puri and daughter Namrata Puri married to Shirish Bagwa. Recalling his last days, his son Rajiv revealed that Puri suffered an accident during the shoot of Guddu Dhanoa's Jaal: The Trap (2003) in Himachal Pradesh, where his face and eyes suffered serious injuries, due to which he had to undergo frequent blood transfusions.

Puri joined the Rashtriya Swayamsevak Sangh (RSS) at the age of 15 or 16 while living in Shimla. He became actively involved, eventually serving as the "Mukhya Shikshak" (chief teacher) of his local shakha. Puri credited the discipline and values instilled by the RSS for shaping his character and work ethic, which he maintained throughout his theatre and film career, keeping him grounded in an industry which was often criticized for moral decline.

== Career ==
Puri acted in more than 450 films between 1967 and 2005, most of which were commercially successful, and is regarded as one of the most successful villains in Bollywood.

=== Career beginnings ===
Puri's family had previous film connections. The singer and actor K. L. Saigal, one of the pioneers of Indian cinema, was Puri's first cousin. Inspired by the fame of their cousin, Puri's older brothers, Chaman and Madan, moved to Mumbai in the 1950s to try their luck in films, finding work as character actors. Puri likewise came to Mumbai in the mid-1950s to try his luck, but failed his first screen test. However, he managed to land a stable job with the Employees State Insurance Corporation (ESIC), a government organization, and indulged his hobby of acting by becoming part of an amateur natak mandali or stage group. His group often performed at the Prithvi Theatre in plays written by Satyadev Dubey. He eventually became well known as a stage actor and even won the Sangeet Natak Akademi Award in 1979. This theatre recognition soon led to work in television advertisements and eventually to films at the relatively late age of 40.

This was in the early 1970s, and he had little dialogue in his first few films, despite his baritone voice that would be his source of fame in later years. These small appearances were filmed while Puri continued with his government job in order to support his family. Throughout the 1970s, Puri worked in supporting roles, frequently typecast as the henchman of the main antagonist. The "super-hit" movie Hum Paanch (1980) was the first film in which he played the main villain. His acting performance, personality, and voice were first noticed and praised in this film. After that, Puri was cast as the main villain in other movies. Puri went on to work in Hindi, Kannada, Marathi, Punjabi, Malayalam, Telugu, Tamil and even Hollywood films. His main field was Hindi cinema.

=== Established actor ===
In 1982, Puri played the main villain, "Jagavar Choudhary" in the Subhash Ghai super-hit film Vidhaata. That year, he again played the main villain, "JK", in the movie Shakti co-starring Dilip Kumar and Amitabh Bachchan. In 1983, Ghai again cast him as the main villain, "Pasha", in the successful movie Hero. Puri regularly starred in subsequent Ghai films.

He is known to international audiences for his roles as the main antagonist Mola Ram in Steven Spielberg and George Lucas's Indiana Jones and the Temple of Doom (1984) and as Gandhi's Muslim employer and patron in South Africa in Richard Attenborough's Gandhi (1982). For Indiana Jones, Puri shaved his head, creating such an impression that he kept his head shaved thereafter. His baldness gave him the flexibility to experiment with different looks as a villain in subsequent movies, with Puri wearing a wig in every film thereafter. Puri and Spielberg shared a great rapport and Spielberg often said in interviews: "Amrish is my favorite villain. The best the world has ever produced and ever will!"

Puri was successful in villainous roles in the 1980s and 1990s. His screen presence and baritone voice made his roles stand out amongst other villain characters of the day. In these roles, Puri is best remembered as "Mogambo" in Mr. India, "Jagavar" in Vidhaata, "Thakral" in Meri Jung, "Bhujang" in Tridev, "Balwant Rai" in Ghayal, "Barrister Chadda" in Damini and "Thakur Durjan Singh" in Karan Arjun. His comic role in Chachi 420, that he acted alongside Kamal Haasan, was also critically praised.

From the 1990s until his death in 2005, Puri was also featured in protagonist-supporting film roles. Some of these notable roles are Dilwale Dulhaniya Le Jayenge, Phool Aur Kaante, Gardish, Pardes, Virasat, Ghatak, Mujhe Kucch Kehna Hai, China Gate. He received the Filmfare Best Supporting Actor award for Meri Jung and Virasat.

== Illness and death ==
Puri was diagnosed with myelodysplastic syndrome, a rare form of blood cancer and had undergone brain surgery for his condition. He was admitted to the Hinduja Hospital on 27 December 2004. His condition required frequent removal of the blood accumulated in the cerebral region of the brain. After some time, he slipped into a coma. Puri died around 7:30 a.m on 12 January 2005.

His body was brought to his residence for fans to pay their last respects, and his funeral was on 13 January 2005 at the Shivaji Park crematorium.

== Awards and nominations ==
=== Awards ===
- 1968: Maharashtra State Drama
- 1979: Sangeet Natak Akademi Award for Theatre
- 1986: Filmfare Award for Best Supporting Actor – Meri Jung
- 1991: Maharashtra State Gaurav Pur Ghatak
- 1997: Star Screen Award for Best Supporting Actor|Screen Award for Best Supporting Actor – Ghatak: Lethal
- 1997: Filmfare Award for Best Supporting Actor – Ghatak: Lethal
- 1998: Filmfare Award for Best Supporting Actor – Virasat
- 1998: Screen Award for Best Supporting Actor – Virasat

=== Nominations ===
- 1990: Filmfare Award for Best Villain – Tridev
- 1992: Filmfare Award for Best Villain – Saudagar
- 1993: Filmfare Award for Best Supporting Actor – Muskurahat
- 1993: Filmfare Award for Best Villain – Tahalka
- 1994: Filmfare Award for Best Supporting Actor – Gardish
- 1994: Filmfare Award for Best Villain – Damini
- 1996: Filmfare Award for Best Supporting Actor – Dilwale Dulhania Le Jayenge
- 1996: Filmfare Award for Best Villain – Karan Arjun
- 1999: Filmfare Award for Best Villain – Koyla
- 2000: Filmfare Award for Best Villain – Baadshah
- 2002: Filmfare Award for Best Villain – Gadar: Ek Prem Katha
- 2000: Zee Cine Award for Best Actor in a Negative Role – Baadshah
- 2000: Zee Cine Award for Best Actor in a Negative Role – Taal
- 2002: Zee Cine Award for Best Actor in a Negative Role – Gadar: Ek Prem Katha

== Legacy ==
Puri is known for his versatility in his performances by use of his voice, gaze, and screen presence. He has been compared to other noteworthy actors, including Dilip Kumar, Raaj Kumar and Amitabh Bachchan.

On 22 June 2019, Puri was honoured with a Google Doodle. Commemorating his 87th birthday, Google carried his picture and the accompanying text read as, "If at first you don't succeed, try, try again—and you might end up like Indian film actor Amrish Puri, who overcame an early setback on the way to fulfilling his big screen dreams." In 2022, Puri was placed in Outlook India's "75 Best Bollywood Actors" list.

== Bibliography ==
- Puri, Amrish; Sabharwal, Jyoti (2006). The Act of Life. Stellar Publishers. ISBN 978-81-90224-74-1.

== See also ==
- List of Bollywood actors
