= Mogambo (character) =

Fictional character

- Mr. India character
- First appearance: Mr. India; (1987)
- Created by: Shekhar Kapur, Salim-Javed
- Portrayed by: Amrish Puri

In-universe information
- Gender: Male

Mogambo is a supervillain and the primary antagonist in the 1987 Indian science-fiction film Mr. India, directed by Shekhar Kapur. Portrayed by Amrish Puri, Mogambo is considered an iconic villain in Indian cinema, known for his distinctive appearance and the catchphrase "Mogambo khush hua" ("Mogambo is pleased").

== Overview ==
Mogambo is a megalomaniacal dictator and eccentric retired army general who seeks to conquer India. Operating from a secret island lair equipped with advanced technology, including missiles and a den with acid tanks, he plots to destabilize the country through terrorism and chaos. His ultimate, albeit illogical, goal hinges on evicting orphans from a Mumbai orphanage, tying his schemes to the film’s protagonists.

== Development ==
Created by writers Salim Khan and Javed Akhtar, the character of Mogambo was inspired by the 1953 Hollywood film Mogambo. According to director Shekhar Kapur, the film adopted a comic-book tone, and Mogambo was written to match that exaggerated style. Director Shekhar Kapur described him as a "Shakespearean character in a village nautanki," someone who combined menace with theatrical flair—both fearsome and oddly charismatic. Javed Akhtar reportedly shaped Mogambo with the intention of creating a mythic and larger-than-life antagonist rather than a conventional realistic villain. Unlike earlier Salim–Javed villains such as Gabbar Singh, Mogambo was designed to be menacing through presence and dialogue, with limited direct on-screen violence. The character’s line "Mogambo khush hua" was conceived as a signature catchphrase symbolizing the villain’s authority and egotism. Kapur initially considered reducing its repetition, but Akhtar insisted it would gain cultural significance.

When it came to casting, the makers wanted a new villain who could become as iconic as Amjad Khan’s Gabbar Singh in Sholay or Kulbhushan Kharbanda’s Shakaal in Shaan. Auditions were held for nearly two months, and several well-known actors known for playing villains also approached the team. Initially, Anupam Kher was considered but he turned down the role. With more than 60% of the film already shot, producer Boney Kapoor, writer Javed Akhtar, and director Shekhar Kapur eventually agreed that no one could play Mogambo better than Amrish Puri.

Puri was deeply involved in shaping the character. He got a detailed sketch made of Mogambo's appearance, complete with wig, costume, and accessories. Producer Boney Kapoor promised tailor Madhav double the fee if he could bring that sketch to life. Madhav, who originally charged ₹10,000, ended up being paid ₹20,000 for delivering the exact look. "He was so excited that he worked on his look with Madhav tailor and his make-up man Govind. While the dialogues and punchlines were written by Javed sahab, his look added the chaar chaand to Mogambo's personality. I give all the credit to him for that look and the way he played Mogambo. The rest, as they say, is history," Kapoor later recalled.

In an old interview, Amrish Puri himself said of the role: "Mogambo went beyond expectations. Shekhar Kapur wanted a comic-book villain, not a scary one. Playing a bad man children loved was great fun—Mogambo was grand, but never frightening."

== Legacy ==
The success of Mr. India made Mogambo a cult figure, cementing Puri's place in Indian cinema. Following this, he went on to act in several major South Indian films. He soon became one of the highest-paid villains in Indian cinema, remembered for his baritone voice, commanding presence, and unforgettable performances.

His catchphrase, "Mogambo khush hua," entered Bollywood’s lexicon, becoming a pop-culture reference. The character is often ranked alongside Sholay's Gabbar Singh as one of Indian cinema’s greatest villains, with Puri reportedly earning ₹1 crore for the role, making him the highest-paid villain actor of his time.

The Times of India described him "a theatrical villain both terrifying and oddly beloved."

The character has also been used in India’s political lexicon. On 10 October 2026, Rahul Gandhi invoked Mogambo to criticise Prime Minister Narendra Modi over allegations of “vote chori”, accusing him of undermining democracy.
