= Mocambo =

Mocambo may refer to:

- Mocambo (settlement), a type of village-sized community composed mainly of runaway slaves in colonial Brazil
- Mocambo (nightclub), a nightclub in West Hollywood, California, United States
- Mocambo (restaurant), a restaurant in Kolkata, West Bengal, India
- El Mocambo, a live music and entertainment venue in Toronto, Ontario, Canada
- Theobroma bicolor, commonly known as the mocambo tree, a Central and South American species which produces edible fruit and is related to the better-known Theobroma cacao (cocoa tree)
