= Mr. India (1987 film) =

1987 Indian film by Shekhar Kapur

- Theatrical poster
- Directed by: Shekhar Kapur
- Written by: Salim–Javed
- Produced by: Boney Kapoor; Surinder Kapoor
- Starring: Anil Kapoor; Sridevi; Amrish Puri
- Cinematography: Baba Azmi
- Edited by: Waman Bhonsle; Gurudutt Shirali
- Music by: Laxmikant–Pyarelal
- Production company: Narsimha Enterprises
- Distributed by: Sujata Films
- Release date: 29 May 1987
- Running time: 179 minutes
- Country: India
- Language: Hindi
- Budget: ₹38 million
- Box office: ₹100 million (India)

Mr. India is a 1987 Indian Hindi-language science fiction superhero film directed by Shekhar Kapur and produced jointly by Boney Kapoor and Surinder Kapoor under the Narsimha Enterprises banner. The story and screenplay was written by the duo Salim–Javed in what was their last collaboration before their split. Starring Anil Kapoor, Sridevi, and Amrish Puri, the film tells the story of Arun Verma (Kapoor), a humble violinist and philanthropist. He receives a cloaking device that provides invisibility. While renting out his house to pay his debts, he meets a journalist Seema Sahni (Sridevi) and falls in love with her. Meanwhile, criminal Mogambo (Puri) has plans to conquer India.

After watching his previous directorial venture Masoom, a 1983 family drama about children, Boney Kapoor approached Kapur to make another film with a similar theme. Principal photography was handled by Baba Azmi, and took place in Srinagar, Mumbai, and other locations in India, starting in July 1985, and finished after 350 days. Laxmikant–Pyarelal composed the soundtrack, while Akhtar wrote the lyrics. After filming ended, Waman Bhonsle and Gurudutt Shirali jointly edited it. Veteran cameraman Peter Pereira was responsible for the special effects in the movie. Arun Patil handled mechanical components of these effects. In the pre-digital era, these effects were achieved using masking techniques as well as traditional and in-camera tricks.

Mr. India was released on 29 May 1987. It emerged as a commercial success and became the second highest-grossing film of the year at the Indian box office behind Hukumat, where it earned ₹100 million (US$7.72 million) against a ₹38 million (US$2.93 million) budget; it was also an overseas hit in China. It received widespread acclaim from contemporary and modern critics, with most of them appreciating the performances of Anil Kapoor and Sridevi. In 2013, Sridevi was awarded the Special Award at the 58th Filmfare Awards.

Mr. India was a breakthrough for its director and cast members and became a milestone in Hindi cinema for its rarely filmed superhero genre, which was followed by several Indian films in later years. It was remade in Tamil as En Rathathin Rathame (1989) and Kannada as Jai Karnataka (1989). A 3D sequel, titled Mr. India 2, was announced in 2011 but has not yet entered production.

== Plot ==
Mogambo is a criminal with a private army and a goal to conquer India. From his hidden island, he monitors all the crimes perpetrated by his henchmen to destabilise India. He has complete loyalty of his army who acknowledge him with the phrase "Hail Mogambo!". Mogambo, is also seen as ill tempered and his entire staff is mostly relieved when he says "Mogambo khush hua" (Hindi for "Mogambo is happy").

Mogambo's ultimate aim is to get a device that would turn people invisible, this, he thinks, will help him conquer India and the rest of the world more easily. Meanwhile Arun Verma(the protagonist) is a street violinist and philanthropist who rents an old house that he calls a "hostel" to take care of orphaned children with the help of his cook named "Calendar". Arun is seldom able to make ends meet and is in deep debt, so he decides to rent out a room on the first floor. Seema Soni, his first tenant, is a local journalist who eventually becomes friends with everyone.

One day Arun meets a family friend, Professor Sinha and learns that Arun's late father, a renowned scientist, had created a cloaking device that would make its user invisible. It is also revealed in a flashback that Mogambo was responsible for Arun's father's death. After, Daga and Teja, two of Mogambo’s henchmen, evict Arun, Seema, and the children from the hostel in order to use it as a smuggling center. Later, Sinha is identified by Mogambo's henchmen and they try to abduct him to get the device but Sinha flees.

Arun then receives a letter from Sinha that explains where the device is hidden. With the directions in the letter, and accompanied by his ward, Arun enters his father's old laboratory, where he finds the device. He then wears the device and when he activates it, he becomes invisible. It is revealed that the invisibility does not work on the color Red and the person can be seen under red light or through red glass. Arun decides to use the invisibility to fight crime with another identity and calls himself "Mr. India". He starts by fighting corrupt businesses in his neighbourhood, which happen to be Mogambo's.

Meanwhile, Seema being a crime reporter for a local news daily assumes the identity of a Hawaiian dancer "Hawa Hawaii" and infiltrates a lavish party hosted by Daga, one of Mogambo's goons. But she is identified and caught by Daga. She is, however rescued by Mr. India. Seema subsequently falls in love with Mr. India. On another occasion, Arun uses the device to trick one of Mogambo's henchmen to foil his criminal plan of stealing a gold idol of the Hindu god Hanuman from a temple. On hearing about the invisible Mr. India, Mogambo is pleased that he finally has a way to get to the invisibility device. He, then orders bombs to be placed around the country so that Mr. India can be baited to help and then be caught.

Tina, a child who stays at Arun's hostel is killed by one such bomb disguised as a toy. Mogambo, understands that though Mr. India tries to protect the entire country he is particularly fond of the kids in Arun's hostel. Hence, Arun, Seema, Calendar, and the other children at the hostel are abducted by Mogambo and brought to his secret hideout on the remote island. Arun admits to being Mr. India when Mogambo threatens to kill two of the children; but because Arun has lost the device by accidentally dropping it somewhere during the capture, he cannot become invisible to prove himself. Mogambo gives them time to correctly identify Mr. India and sends them into a cell.

They manage to escape after stealing the keys from a guard. Meanwhile, Mogambo activates four intercontinental ballistic missiles, which are poised to destroy all of India. Arun confronts him, the two fight, and Arun gains an upper hand. But as he is about to stop the missiles, Mogambo warns that the missiles have been fuelled and if he stops them now they will fail to launch and blow the island up . Nevertheless, Arun deactivates the launch, and the missiles detonate on the launch pad. Arun, Seema, Calendar, and the children escape; Mogambo's fortress is destroyed, and Mogambo dies. It is later shown in an epilogue that Mr. India is being felicitated and all the children, Arun and Seema are at the ceremony.

== Cast ==
- Anil Kapoor as Arun Verma/Mr. India
- Sridevi as Seema Soni
- Amrish Puri as Mogambo
- Ashok Kumar as Prof. Sinha
- Annu Kapoor as Mr. Gaitonde, Seema's newspaper editor
- Ramesh Deo as a police inspector
- Ajit Vachani as Teja
- Bob Christo as Mr. Wolcott
- Harish Patel as Roopchand
- Anjan Srivastav as Baburam
- Satish Kaushik as Calendar
- Ahmed Khan as an orphan kid
- Aftab Shivdasani as Orphan
- Yunus Parvez as Maniklal
- Sharat Saxena as Daga
- Gurbachan Singh as Captain Zorro

== Production ==
=== Development ===
After watching Shekhar Kapur's family film Masoom (1983), producer Boney Kapoor approached him to make another film with themes related to children; Kapur immediately accepted the offer and received a ₹10,000 (US$771.89) salary. Kapur had been a fan of comic books and always wanted to make a superhero film. He had written several comic books that received international acclaim: Devi, Snakewoman, The Warlord, The Omega Crystal, and Mantra. Salim–Javed, a duo consisting of Salim Khan and Javed Akhtar, was signed to write the story and screenplay for ₹70,000 (US$5,403.24). Several publications claimed they took inspiration from the science fiction films Mr. X (1957) and Mr. X In Bombay (1964), but Kapur denied these reports saying that he never found copies of the films. Kapur wrote the dialogue in Hindustani, a mix of Hindi and Urdu. Boney Kapoor co-produced the film alongside his father, Surinder Kapoor, under the Narsimha Enterprises banner.

=== Casting ===
Anil Kapoor and Sridevi were cast as the main protagonists, Amrish Puri as the principal antagonist. Anil Kapoor plays Arun, a poor street violinist and philanthropist who rents a large, old house to help ten orphans. Salim–Javed made the role specifically for Rajesh Khanna, but later they asked Amitabh Bachchan to play it when they found Khanna did not suit the role. Bachchan, however, felt that the concept of an invisible man would overshadow his performance, saying, "The real hero of the film is an invisible character. So why do you need me?". The duo took this as an "insult", and at a Holi festival held a few days later, Akhtar told him that neither he nor Khan would work with him again. In fact, Khan never said that and blamed Akhtar for this misunderstanding. This resulted in their split, making Mr. India their final collaboration. In an interview with Rediff.com, Anil Kapoor admitted he added his "own style" to the role so the audience would not realize it "was going to be done" by Bachchan.

Sridevi was given the role of Seema Sahni, a journalist who becomes a friend and then falls in love with Arun. After watching several of her Tamil-language films from the 1970s, Boney Kapoor cast his future wife in the film and went to Madras (present-day Chennai) to meet her. Kapur said he cast Sridevi solely because she "represented every Indian male's dreams" with "her baby-face" and "luscious body". Having established herself as one of the most popular actresses, she charged the producer ₹800,000 (US$61,751.27) to ₹850,000 (US$65,610.72), while her mother Rajeswari Yanger, who often accompanied her, asked for ₹1 million (US$77,189.08). Kapur actually paid her a higher amount, around ₹1.1 million (US$84,907.99). This was the first film Kapur had shot with the actress.

Satish Kaushik, who also served as an associate director alongside Raj Kanwar, portrays Calendar, Arun's assistant. When asked by The Hindu about his character's name, he explained it originated from his father's (a Delhi-based salesman) dealer who liked to insert the word calendar while talking. After hearing the story from his father, Kaushik suggested the idea to Kapur, who liked it immediately. Annu Kapoor features as Gaitonde, Sridevi's newspaper editor; he was paid ₹5,000 (US$385.95). Amrish Puri was cast as Mogambo, a character that was inspired by Ibn-e-Safi's Jasoosi Dunya, following his meeting with Boney Kapoor and Kapur while shooting the 1987 thriller Loha in Ooty. It was reported that he received a salary of ₹10 million (US$771,890.82), making him the highest-paid Indian villain actor of all time. The part was initially offered to Anupam Kher, however, after his screen test, the crew believed he looked "more funny than ferocious". According to Kaushik, Puri was chosen later because of his "menacing" persona. Kapur asked him to imagine he is playing a Shakespearean character to "nine-year-old kid" while portraying Mogambo.

=== Filming ===
The scene where a child sees the invisible Arun through a red glass. According to Pereira, Azmi would shoot Arun's part normally with a black paper covering the lower-half and a red filter on the lens. He later combined the image with the scene where the child sees him through a red glass.

Baba Azmi began the principal photography of Mr. India on 6 July 1985. In later years, Kapur recalled it as "terrible days" for him and spoke the difficulties he and the film's cast and crew members faced in this period. According to Kapur, "[It] had to be shot slowly because of all the trick photography and technical innovation it entailed." Saroj Khan and Veeru Devgan were the choreographer and action director, respectively, while Bijon Dasgupta finished the production design. A big set was built at the R. K. Studio for Mogambo's sequences. The film's opening scene, featuring a group of governmental officers alighting from heavily armoured vehicles, was shot at the Sophia College for Women in Mumbai.

The sequences where Sridevi dresses up as Charlie Chaplin's on-screen character The Tramp took between 30 and 35 days to finish. In an interview in Filmfare's December 1992 issue, she called the sequences "my all-time favourite" and revealed that the film's crew loved her while she wore the costume. The song "Kate Nahin Kat Te" was shot in Srinagar. Saroj Khan found it to be the "most difficult song" of her career, and said she took fifteen minutes to do the choreography, requiring her to create "sensuous movements". Filming was finished after 350 days and Waman Bhonsle and Gurudutt Shirali edited it. Kapur asked them to cut several repeats of the line, "Mogambo khush hua", as he felt it appeared too often in the film. Akhtar disagreed with him, convincing him that the line would be popular with the audience. Peter Pereira handled the special effects. He used mechanical effects to make Anil Kapoor's character invisible and stop-motion technique for his footprints.

== Soundtrack ==
Mr. India

Soundtrack album by Laxmikant–Pyarelal
- Released: 30 October 1986
- Genre: Feature-film Soundtrack
- Length: 38:46
- Label: T-Series
- Producer: Laxmikant–Pyarelal

The duo Laxmikant–Pyarelal composed the film's soundtrack with lyrics written by Javed Akhtar. The title of the song "Hawa Hawai"—initially "Kahate Hain Mujhko Hawa Hawai" ("They Call Me Hawa Hawai")—originated from an Urdu phrase, "Bhai kahan hawa hawai ghoom rahe ho?" ("Brother, how come you are floating about?"). Akhtar used only the words hawa hawai because he felt it was "more interesting". Kishore Kumar, Anuradha Paudwal, Kavita Krishnamurthy, Alisha Chinai and Shabbir Kumar sang the songs. "Hawa Hawai" was originally to be sung by Asha Bhosle but Laxmikant–Pyarelal retained Krishnamurthy once they determined she was the "perfect" choice.

T-Series released the album on 30 October 1986; it became a commercial success. 2.5 million cassettes were sold, according to a 24 July 1987 The Indian Express report. M. Rahman of India Today wrote it "has started a trend and film-goers will be hearing similar music over and over again in several forthcoming films". In 2018, Scroll.in praised Kapur's ability to "insert grown-up feelings into an otherwise family-friendly film without being tasteless" in "Kaate Nahin Kat Te". The song, which Nikhat Kazmi labelled as the "encapsulation of the feminine nonpareil", was parodied in Rangeela (1995), Aiyyaa (2012), and Gunday (2014), and sampled in "O Janiya" from Force 2 (2016). "Hawa Hawai" was referenced in Salaam Bombay! (1988), inspired the title of Amole Gupte's 2014 drama film, and was remixed for Tumhari Sulu in 2018; Sridevi performed it at the Hope '86 concert in Calcutta (present-day Kolkata).

Mr. India (Original Motion Picture Soundtrack)
No.	Title	Singer(s)	Length
1.	"Kate Nahin Kat Te"	Kishore Kumar, Alisha Chinai	6:37
2.	"Karte Hain Hum Pyaar Mr. India Se"	Kishore Kumar, Kavita Krishnamurthy	6:36
3.	"Zindagi Ki Yahi Reet Hai" (Part 1)	Kishore Kumar	5:13
4.	"Zindagi Ki Yahi Reet Hai" (Part 2)	Kavita Krishnamurthy	1:25
5.	"Zindagi Ki Yahi Reet Hai" (Part 3 - Khelate Khelate Ek)	Kishore Kumar/Md Aziz	1:29
6.	"Parody Song"	Shabbir Kumar, Anuradha Paudwal	9:24
7.	"Hawa Hawai"	Kavita Krishnamurthy	7:02
Total length:			38:46

== Release ==
Mr. India was one of the most anticipated Indian films of 1987, and journalists expected it to be a breakthrough for Anil Kapoor's acting career. Made on a budget of ₹38 million (equivalent to ₹480 million or US$4.9 million in 2023), a big budget for an Indian film at the time, Sujata Films distributed the film and released it on 25 May 1987. It ran at theatres for over 175 days, becoming a silver jubilee film. (Note: A silver jubilee film is one that completes a theatrical run of 25 weeks or 175 days.) The Hindustan Times declared it "the talk of the town" in Bombay (present-day Mumbai), while Sunday magazine reported Kapur had become one of Bombay's "hottest directors". Trade analysts raved about Sridevi's performance, suggesting the film's title be changed to Miss India.

Several film festivals have screened Mr. India since its release. In August 2002, it was shown at the Locarno International Film Festival. On 22 April 2007, the film was selected for the Bollywood by Night section at the Indian Film Festival of Los Angeles. Anil Kapoor attended a special screening for the film at Indiana University on 7 October 2014. Following Sridevi's death, on 23 June 2018, the London Indian Film Festival screened it as a tribute to her. Mr. India was released on DVD in all regions as a single-disc pack in NTSC and PAL widescreen formats on 9 August 2007 and 10 February 2009, respectively.

=== Box office ===
A commercial success, it emerged as the second highest-grossing film of the year at the Indian box office; the film-trade website Box Office India estimated the total earnings at ₹100 million (US$7.72 million). Mr. India was also an overseas box office hit in China, upon its release there in February 1990.

Adjusted for inflation, the film grossed the equivalent of ₹1.62 billion ($21.9 million) in 2025.

=== Critical reception ===
Mr. India garnered positive reviews, with most critics praising Anil Kapoor and Sridevi's performances. On 31 May, The Illustrated Weekly of India's editor Pritish Nandy described it as an "enjoyable potboiler", and opined Sridevi's joie de vivre uplifted the film. He praised, "Her sense of spoof: the effortless sensuality that results in collective orgasm at the rise of a single eyebrow, let alone elaborate song sequences in the rain where she flaunts her every single asset, with easy insouciance." On 30 June, India Today said that Sridevi "breathes life into every scene that she appears in", adding that she had delivered a "scintillating" performance. In his 31 July review for The Indian Express, the critic C. D. Aravind praised Anil Kapoor for giving "a reasonably good performance". He also appreciated Sridevi, writing that she was the "perfect choice" for the role of Seema; he felt the film's special effects were "commendable" and "on [a] par with any foreign film". In October 1987, a reviewer from Sunday observed she has "given the best performance" of her career, attributing the film's success to the actress. Bombay: The City Magazine—in the 1987 issue—commended the film for heralding "a new hero who does the disappearing act to turn the tables on the enemies of the nation".

Mr. India received favourable reviews in the twenty-first century; several reviewers considered it to be a "balance between novelty, technology and all the ingredients of a typically entertaining potboiler". Saibal Chatterjee summarized, "The comic-strip simplicity of narrative and the infectious exuberance of the storytelling made it extremely easy for the massed to relate to the film." K. K. Rai, writing for Stardust, found the screenplay to be "fun-filled" and complimented Kapur for directing the film with "spirit". Sukanya Verma wrote, "Shekhar Kapur's 1987 classic is a labour of love, ambition and ingenuity. Under his direction and Salim–Javed's penmanship, it celebrates compassion and human spirit with generous doses of humour, thrills, music and contrivances." She observed the special effects "don't feel dated" and likened it to the computer-generated images from nowadays' films. Planet Bollywood's Shahid Khan felt the director "deftly mixes all the elements of sci-fi, romance and comedy so well. The mixture is so irresistible that the film tempts more than one viewing." The Indian Express' Shaikh Ayaz noted that the film "features one of Sridevi's most immensely enjoyable performances".

=== Accolades ===
In 2013, Sridevi was awarded a Special Award by the Filmfare Awards for her performances in both the film and Nagina (1986).

== Legacy ==
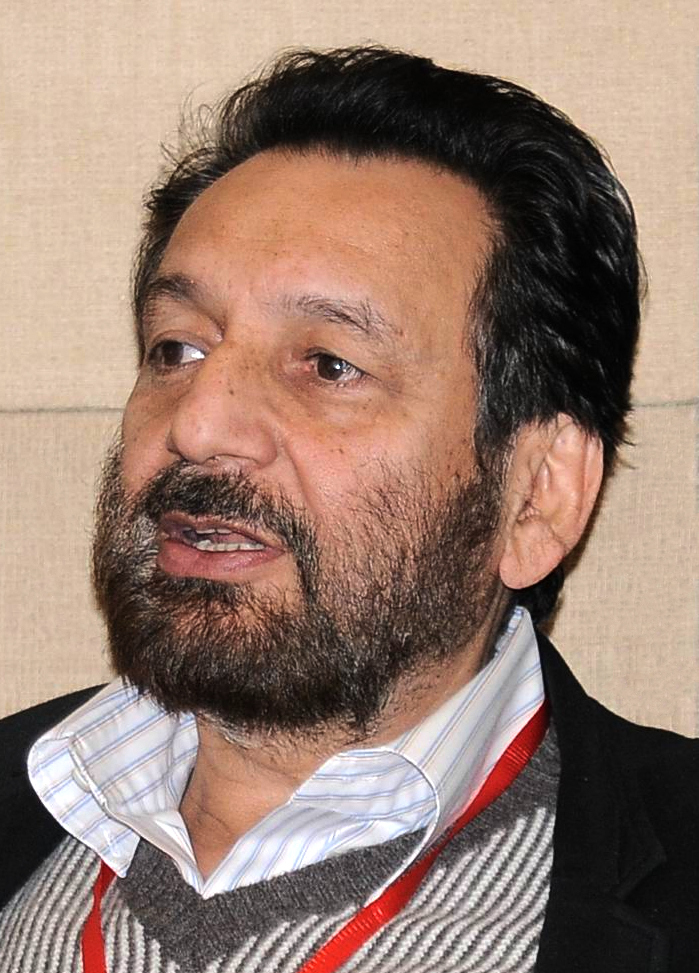
Mr. India is regarded as one of the best works of Kapur (pictured), and gave him a reputation as "the Steven Spielberg of India"

Mr. India attained cult status in Hindi cinema, and many critics have considered it one of the greatest Indian films of all time. Director and critic Raja Sen claimed the film "remains one of the most watchable of that decade, a groundbreaking piece of work with the power to create a new Bollywood genre". Rediff.com's Suparn Verma said it "belongs to every kid and teenager of the 1980s [...] It was a film that gave us hope, a film that made us believe in something extraordinary existing amongst us." It is dubbed as the first mainstream Bollywood science fiction film, and became a turning point for Kapur. In an article published in Verve, Karthik Keramalu credited the film for "[opening] the gates to the idea of a superhero" and "[inspiring] a generation of directors". According to Scottish tabloid Glasgow Times, he has built a reputation as "the Steven Spielberg of India". Kapur has said:

"What has turned out in the last 25 years is it's not the visual effects but the characters that have stayed with the audience. It's always important for me that the actors and characters are what make my films [...] In a way I thank god that we didn't have advance technology because the characters in Mr. India created the awe factor of visual effects."

Following its success, people asked him to make another film with the same cast of children, and several producers offered him a chance to direct their films. Kapur said, "[...] someone told me I would make a lot of money, I realised it was a fundamental reason not to make a film, as it is the beginning of making a bad film". Kunal Kohli, who had watched the film 200 times as of 2008, elaborated that the film's "spirit and essence is just fantastic" and said he had always wanted to make the same type of film. Prawaal Raman declared it as his "all-time favourite", adding, "That's why while making Gayab [(2004)], I never even thought of comparing my film to Mr. India. It is a classic." The film was remade in Tamil as En Rathathin Rathame and Kannada as Jai Karnataka (both 1989).

"The iconic bad guy, who was so bad he was fun. Mogambo was an instant hit. Yes, he was caricatured to the nth degree, but Mogambo was cool. After all, he could send you plummeting into an acid tank with the press of a single button and simply sign off with, 'Mogambo... khush hua!'"

— Filmfare, 2013

Mr. India also became a landmark for Anil Kapoor and Sridevi's career, and in 1992, Sunday featured the film amongst the latter's "landmark films". The actress Vidya Balan told The Hindu that she was impressed by Sridevi's acting, and thought that "[i]f there ever was an encyclopaedia on acting, it would be called Sridevi". In 2003, the Encyclopaedia of Hindi Cinema noted, "Mr. India is most remembered for the outrageously exaggerated villainy of Mogambo who seems to have been inspired by the combined eccentricities of the [James] Bond villains." Filmfare, in 2013, named Mogambo the second-most iconic villain in the history of Indian cinema. Puri's dialogue, "Mogambo khush hua", became popular, and he was subsequently offered the same type of roles in later films. His son, Rajeev Puri, revealed that the actor would be asked to speak the dialogue at every award function he attended. He became the highest-paid villain actor at the time. The dialogue was included in several listings, including Film Companion's "50 Iconic Bollywood Dialogues", Filmfare's "20 Most Famous Bollywood Dialogue", and NDTV's "10 Killer Lines Made Famous by Bollywood Villains". The actor Sunny Deol's role in The Hero: Love Story of a Spy (2003) and the musician Riz Ahmed's 2018 single (from The Long Goodbye album) were modelled and named, respectively, after the character.

Several lists have featured the film. In 2005, Rachna Kanwar of The Times of India considered it to be one of "25 must-see Bollywood movies", noting, "The audiences were thrilled every time Amrish Puri glared down at them with his fiercely bulbous eyes sporting an atrocious blond wig and garish knee high silver heeled boots. They came back again and again to hear him mouth possibly the most repeated line of Hindi cinema (post 80s) [...]" The film was featured by CNN-IBN on their 2013 list of "100 Greatest Indian Films of All Time". The next year, Filmfare included it in their list "100 Filmfare Days". As part of Indian Independence Day's celebration in 2015, the Hindustan Times listed it on its "Top 10 Patriotic Bollywood Films" list. The newspaper Mint has featured the film in their listings three times: "10 Bollywood Superhero Films" and "Children's Day: 10 Memorable Bollywood Films" in 2016, and "70 Iconic Films of Indian Cinema" in 2017.

== Sequel ==
Boney Kapoor announced in 2011 that Mr. India will have a 3D sequel, titled Mr. India 2, and was expected for release in November 2014. While Anil Kapoor and Sridevi would reprise their roles, Salman Khan was cast for the role of Mogambo, marking his third collaboration with the producer after No Entry (2005) and Wanted (2009). Co-produced the film with Sahara Motion Pictures, Boney Kapoor chose A. R. Rahman as the music director. With a budget of ₹1.5 billion (US$28.07 million), the filming was originally planned to start in 2012; however, as of April 2021, it has not begun production. In June 2018, at the 19th IIFA Awards, Anil Kapoor admitted that Sridevi's death four months before and the absence of Puri (who died in January 2005) affected the production, but he added: "We will try our best to follow their legacies so that we can make them proud that we made good films and they all appreciate what we have done."

== See also ==
- Science fiction films in India
- List of Indian superhero films

== Bibliography ==
- Akhtar, Javed; Kabir, Nasreen Munni (2003). Talking Films: Conversations on Hindi Cinema with Javed Akhtar. Oxford University Press. ISBN 978-0-19-566462-1.
- Chaudhuri, Diptakirti (1 October 2015). Written by Salim–Javed: The Story of Hindi Cinema's Greatest Screenwriters. Penguin Group. ISBN 978-93-52140-08-4.
- Gulzar; Nihalani, Govind; Chatterjee, Saibal (2003). Encyclopaedia of Hindi Cinema. Popular Prakashan. ISBN 978-81-7991-066-5.
- Kazmi, Nikhat (1998). The Dream Merchants of Bollywood. UBS Publishers' Distributors. ISBN 978-81-74761-81-1.
- Puri, Amrish; Sabharwal, Jyoti (2006). The Act of Life. Stellar Publishers. ISBN 978-81-90224-74-1.
- Somaaya, Bhawana (2003). The Story So Far: On Screen Off Screen. Indian Express Group. ISBN 978-81-223-1016-0.
