= Ishtar Music =

Indian record label

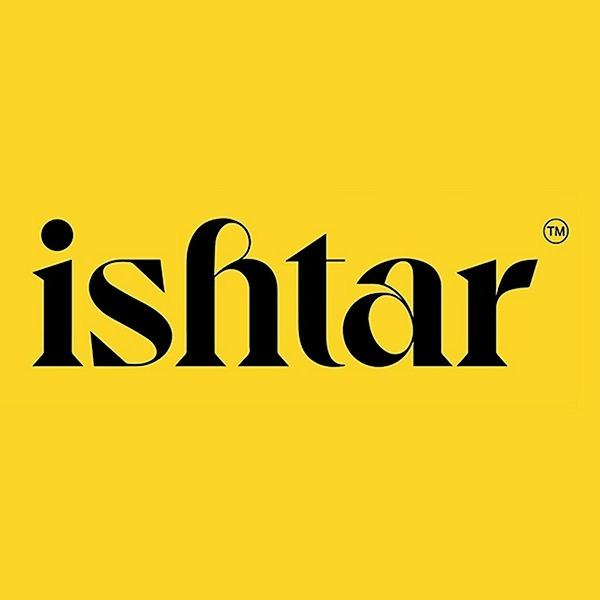
- Trade name: Ishtar Music
- Formerly: Venus Records and Tapes
- Company type: Private
- Founded: 1985; 41 years ago
- Founder: Ganesh Jain and Ratan Jain
- Headquarters: India
- Products: DVD; CD; Cassettes
- Parent: Believe

YouTube information
- Channel: Ishtar Music
- Years active: 2005-present
- Genres: Music videos; Film trailers
- Subscribers: 52.8 million
- Views: 27.6 billion
- Last updated: 18/02/2026
- Website: www.believemusic.com

Ishtar Music, previously known as Venus Records & Tapes, is an Indian record label company (owned by Believe Digital, a French company), and managed by Chaitany, was originally founded by Ganesh Jain and Ratan Jain as Venus Music in 1985 and currently a subsidiary of Believe Digital. It is primarily known for publishing and marketing Bollywood music soundtracks and Indi-pop music. In 2021, the company was acquired by Believe Digital and rebranded as "Ishtar".

== Filmography ==
=== Films produced ===
==== Other works ====
Year	Film
1993	Baazigar
1995	Akele Hum Akele Tum
1997	Yes Boss
1999	Baadshah
2000	Mela
2000	Dhadkan
2000	Josh
2001	Pyaar Tune Kya Kiya
2001	Ajnabee

== Discography ==
=== Hindi ===
Year	Film
1985	Amber
1985	Aaj Ka Daur
1985	Adhikar
1985	Ghar Sansar
1985	Jaan Ki Baazi
1985	Karamdaata
1985	Nasihat
1985	Pahunche Huwey Log
1985	Qaidi No. 911
1985	Saamri
1985	Shabnam
1985	Tan-Badan
1985	Tulsi
1986	Aag Hi Aag
1986	Aisa Pyar Kahan
1986	Anjaam
1986	Anubhav
1986	Aurat Aur Patthar
1986	Dak Bangla
1986	Ehsaan Aap Ka
1986	Inteqaam Ki Aag
1986	Jaan Hatheli Pe
1986	Khushkismat
1986	Love and God
1986	Maa Beti
1986	Mangal Dada
1986	Mera Lahoo
1986	Naam-O-Nishan
1986	Tahkhana
1986	Tarzan And Cobra
1986	Woh Subha Kabhi To Ayegi
1987	Car Thief
1987	Dariya Dil
1987	Ghar Mein Ram Gali Mein Shyam
1987	Insaaf
1987	Insaf Ki Pukar
1987	Jeete Hain Shaan Se
1987	Kaash
1987	Kachchi Kali
1987	Kamagni
1987	Kaun Jeeta? Kaun Haara?
1987	Khudgarz
1987	Mard Ki Zabaan
1987	Mohabbat Ki Aag
1987	Paap Ki Duniya
1987	Param Dharam
1987	Parivaar
1987	Shahenshah
1987	Thikana
1987	Watan Ke Rakhwale
1988	Aakhri Baazi
1988	Agnee
1988	Asmaan Se Ooncha
1988	Ghar Ghar Ki Kahani
1988	Gunahon Ka Faisla
1988	Gunahon Ki Shatranj
1988	Hero Hiralal
1988	Jaisi Karni Waisi Bharnii
1988	Jalaakar Raakh Kar Doonga
1988	Khoon Bhari Maang
1988	Laal Paree
1988	Maalamaal
1988	Mardangi
1988	Mera Naseeb
1988	Naya Khoon
1988	Paanch Paapi
1988	Qatil
1988	Shiva-Shakti
1988	Sone Pe Suhaaga
1988	Taaqatwar
1988	Tohfa Mohabbat Ka
1988	Veerana
1988	Yateem
1989	Aag Ka Gola
1989	Aakhri Ghulam
1989	Batwara
1989	Gola Barood
1989	Jurm
1989	Kala Bazaar
1989	Khol De Meri Zubaan
1989	Kishen Kanhaiya
1989	Kroadh
1989	Ladaai
1989	Lashkar
1989	Mitti Aur Sona
1989	Na-Insaafi
1989	Pyar Ka Karz
1989	Swarg
1989	Taqdeer Ka Tamasha
1989	Zakham
1990	Aaj Ka Arjun
1990	Apmaan Ki Aag
1990	Baaghi
1990	Do Pal
1990	Dushman
1990	Ghar Ho To Aisa
1990	Ghayal
1990	Jawani Zindabad
1990	Kanoon Ki Zanjeer
1990	Muqaddar Ka Badshaah
1990	Naach Govinda Naach
1990	Nyay Anyay
1990	Pathar Ke Insan
1990	Sanam Aap Ki Khatir
1990	Shiva
1990	Yaara Dildara
1990	Yodha
1991	Akayla
1991	Bhabhi
1991	First Love Letter
1991	Garajna
1991	Inspector Kiron
1991	Izzat
1991	Lakshmanrekha
1991	Love
1991	Nishchaiy
1991	Phool Bane Angaray
1991	Pratikar
1991	Pyaar Ka Saaya
1991	Ranbhoomi
1991	Saajan
1991	Saanson Ki Sargam
1991	Shola Aur Shabnam
1991	Sone Ki Zanjeer
1991	Suryavanshi
1991	Trinetra
1991	Yaad Rakhegi Duniya
1992	Aankhen
1992	Balmaa
1992	Balwaan
1992	Deewana
1992	Dil Hai Betaab
1992	Dil Ki Baazi
1992	Dil Ne Ikraar Kiya
1992	Insaniyat Ke Devta
1992	Jaagruti
1992	Khiladi
1992	King Uncle
1992	Koyal
1992	Mashooq
1992	Nargis
1992	Parasmani
1992	Platform
1992	Tilak
1992	Umar 55 Ki Dil Bachpan Ka
1992	Yugandhar
1992	Zid
1993	Aadmi Khilona Hai
1993	Aulad Ke Dushman
1993	Baazigar
1993	Dalaal
1993	Dhartiputra
1993	Dilwale
1993	Elaan
1993	Gunaah
1993	Insaniyat
1993	Ishq Mein Jeena Ishq Mein Marna
1993	Khoon Ka Sindoor
1993	Kundan
1993	Maahir
1993	Milan
1993	Namak
1993	Paramaatma
1993	Pehchaan
1993	Pehla Pehla Pyar
1993	Salaami
1993	Sangdil Sanam
1993	Sangraam
1993	Shaktiman
1994	Aag
1994	Aatish: Feel the Fire
1994	Hulchul
1994	Jai Vikraanta
1994	Jawab
1994	Kranti Kshetra
1994	Krantiveer
1994	Maidan-E-Jung
1994	Main Khiladi Tu Anari
1994	Mere Humsafar
1994	Miss 420
1994	Mohra
1994	Mr. Azaad
1994	Nishana
1994	Oh Darling Yeh Hai India
1994	Papi Gudia
1994	Saajan Ki Baahon Mein
1994	Surakshaa
1994	Zakhmi Dil
1995	Aag Ka Darya
1995	Akele Hum Akele Tum
1995	Guddu
1995	Gundaraj
1995	Hum Sub Chor Hain
1995	Humse Hai Muqabla
1995	Jai Bharat
1995	Rajkumar
1995	Sanjay
1995	Smuggler
1995	Tu Chor Main Sipahi
1995	Zamana Deewana
1996	Aar Ya Paar
1996	Bal Bramhachari
1996	Daraar
1996	Dhaal
1996	Dil Tera Diwana
1996	Duniya Dilwalon Ki
1996	Ghatak
1996	Hasina Aur Nagina
1996	Humko Ishq Ne Mara
1996	Judaai
1996	Judwaa
1996	Mr. Romeo
1996	Mukka
1996	Shohrat
1996	Udaan
1996	Uff: Yeh Mohabbat
1997	Aunty No. 1
1997	Barsaat Ki Raat
1997	Betaabi
1997	Border
1997	Deewana Mastana
1997	Hameshaa
1997	Yes Boss
1998	Achanak
1998	Bandhan
1998	Barood
1998	Deewana Hoon Mein Tera/Love Story 98
1998	Dil Se..
1998	Dulhan Banoo Main Teri
1998	Humse Badhkar Kaun
1998	Jungle Love Story
1998	Keemat: They Are Back
1998	Laawaris
1998	Satya
1999	Baadshah
1999	Dillagi
1999	Ganga Ki Kasam
1999	Jaanwar
1999	Le Chal Apne Sang
1999	Mast
1999	Mela
1999	Pukar
1999	Sooryavansham
2000	Baaghi
2000	Dhadkan
2000	Joru Ka Ghulam
2000	Josh
2000	Kahin Pyaar Na Ho Jaaye
2000	Karobaar: The Business of Love
2000	Mujhe Meri Biwi Se Bachaao
2000	Tujhko Pukare Mera Pyaar
2001	Hum Ho Gaye Aapke
2001	Mitti
2001	Moksha
2001	Pyaar Tune Kya Kiya
2001	Uljhan
2002	Desh Devi Maa Ashapura
2002	Hathyar
2002	Humraaz
2002	Shaheed Bhagat Singh
2002	Talaash: The Hunt Begins...
2002	Tum Se Achcha Kaun Hai
2003	Hungama
2003	Qayamat: City Under Threat
2003	Border Hindustan Ka
2003	Basti
2003	Tum?: A Dangerous Obsession
2003	Market
2003	Mission Mumbai
2004	Elaan
2004	Yuva
2004	Hulchul
2004	Meri Biwi Ka Jawaab Nahin
2004	Sheen
2004	Hawas: An Unusual Love Story
2004	Hatya
2004	Mashooqa
2004	Yehi Hai Zindagi
2004	Dukaan
2005	Garam Masala
2005	Pyaar Mein Twist
2005	Silsiilay
2005	Meri Jung: One Man Army
2005	Rafta Rafta – The Speed
2005	Shaadi No. 1
2005	Chaahat – Ek Nasha
2005	Anjaane
2005	Rain: The Terror Within...
2005	Shabnam Mousi
2005	Bad Friend
2005	Chetna: The Excitement
2006	Aap Ki Khatir
2008	Maan Gaye Mughal-e-Azam
2009	De Dana Dan
2012	Tezz
2014	Gang of Ghosts
2021	Hungama 2
2025	Mahavatar Narsimha

=== Tamil ===
- Manmadan Ambu
- Vaanam
- Siruthai
- Kaavalan
- Singam Puli
- Muthukku Muthaaga
- Pesu

=== Bengali ===
Year	Film
1987	Amar Sangee
1989	Aamar Tumi
1989	Mastan
1990	Balidan
1990	Jowar Bhata
1990	Koyedi
1991	Karz Chukana Hai
1991	Anutap
1992	Priya
1994	Rakta Nadir Dhara
2000	Sasurbari Zindabad
2000	Bhalobasar Choan
2000	Shatruta
2000	Trishul
2001	Pratibad
2001	Guru Sishya
2001	Aaghat
2001	Dada Thakur (2001 film)
2002	Phool Aar Pathor
2002	Annadata
2002	Sathi
2002	Shatrur Mokabila
2002	Pratihinsha
2002	Kurukkhetra
