= Govinda filmography =

List of films of Indian actor Govinda

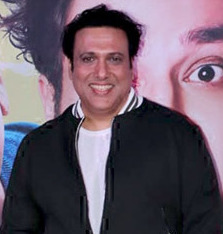
Govinda snapped at trailer launch of the film Fry Day

Govinda is an Indian actor, dancer, comedian and politician known for his work in Hindi films. Govinda's first film was 1986's Love 86, and he has appeared in over 120 films. In June 1999, he was voted the tenth-greatest star of stage or screen in a BBC News Online poll.

During the 1980s, Govinda acted in family, drama, action and romantic films. He started out as an action hero in the 80s and reinvented himself as a comedy hero in the 90s. His earlier box-office hits include Ilzaam (1986), Love 86 (1986), Sindoor (1987), Khudgarz (1987), Dadagiri (1987), Marte Dam Tak (1987), Hatya (1988), Ghar Ghar Ki Kahani (1988), Gair Kanooni (1989), Jaisi Karni Waisi Bharnii (1989), Swarg (1990), Hum (1991), Shola Aur Shabnam (1992). His action hits in 90s include Jaan Se Pyaara (1992), Aankhen (1993), Dulaara (1994), Khuddar (1994) and Andolan (1995). He was recognised later in the decade as a comic actor after playing a mischievous young NCC cadet in the 1992 romance Shola Aur Shabnam. Govinda had lead roles in several commercially successful comedy films, including Aankhen (1993), Raja Babu (1994), Coolie No. 1 (1995), Hero No. 1 (1997), Deewana Mastana (1997), Dulhe Raja (1998), Bade Miyan Chote Miyan (1998), Anari No.1 (1999) and Jodi No. 1 (2001). He received a Filmfare Best Comedian Award for Haseena Maan Jayegi and a Filmfare Special Award for Saajan Chale Sasural. He played six roles in Hadh Kar Di Aapne (2000): Raju and his mother, father, sister, grandmother and grandfather.

After a number of box office flops in the 2000s, his later commercial successes included Bhagam Bhag (2006), Partner (2007), Life Partner (2009), and Holiday (2014). In 2015 Govinda became a judge on Zee TV's dance-contest program, Dance India Dance Super Mom Season 2.

== Films ==
Year	Title	Role(s)	Notes
1986	Love 86	Vikram Doshi	
1986	Ilzaam	Ajay Sharma / Vijay	
1986	Tan-Badan	Ravi Pratap	
1986	Sadaa Suhagan	Ravi	
1986	Duty	DSP Govind	
1987	Dadagiri	Suraj	
1987	Pyaar Karke Dekho	Ravi Kumar	
1987	Mera Lahoo	Govinda Singh	
1987	Marte Dam Tak	Jai	
1987	Khudgarz	Kumar Saxena	
1987	Sindoor	Ravi	
1988	Shiv Shakti	Shakti	
1988	Dariya Dil	Ravi	
1988	Ghar Mein Ram Gali Mein Shyam	Amar	
1988	Pyaar Mohabbat	Raj	
1988	Hatya	Sagar	
1988	Ghar Ghar Ki Kahani	Amar Dhanraj	
1988	Tohfa Mohabbat Ka	Hero	
1988	Jeete Hain Shaan Se	Iqbal Ali	
1988	Halaal Ki Kamai	Shankar	
1988	Paap Ko Jalaa Kar Raakh Kar Doonga	Deepak Malhotra	
1989	Sachai Ki Taqat	Sagar Singh	
1989	Dost Garibon Ka	Vijay/Barkat Ali	
1989	Do Qaidi	Kanu	
1989	Asmaan Se Ooncha	Vikram Malik (Vicky)	
1989	Farz Ki Jung	Vishal	
1989	Gair Kanooni	Om Narayan	
1989	Billoo Badshah	Vijay	
1989	Jaisi Karni Waisi Bharnii	Ravi Verma	
1989	Taaqatwar	John D'Mello	
1989	Jung Baaz	Arjun Srivastav	
1989	Gharana	Ravi Mehra	
1989	Gentleman	Hari, Om	Double Role
1989	Paap Ka Ant	Arjun	
1989	Aakhri Baazi	Ram Kumar	
1990	Maha-Sangram	Arjun 'Munna'	
1990	Taqdeer Ka Tamasha	Satya	
1990	Awaargi	Dhiren Kumar	
1990	Naya Khoon	Dr. Anand	
1990	Izzatdaar	Vijay	
1990	Swarg	Krishna	
1990	Kali Ganga	Govinda	
1990	Apmaan Ki Aag	Vikrant 'Vicky' Narayan Singh	
1990	Paap Ke Dushman	Vijay	Unreleased film
1991	Hum	Vijay	
1991	Karz Chukana Hai	Ravi	
1991	Kaun Kare Kurbanie	Ajit 'Munna' Singh	
1991	Bhabhi	Amar/Nakadram	
1991	Raiszaada	Sanjay	
1992	Shola Aur Shabnam	Karan	
1992	Jaan Se Pyaara	Inspector Jai, Sunder	Double Roles
1992	Radha Ka Sangam	Govinda	
1992	Zulm Ki Hukumat	Pratap Kohli	
1992	Naach Govinda Naach	Govinda	
1992	Baaz	Deva	
1993	Aankhen	Vijay (Bunnu), Gaurishankar	Double role Nominated- Filmfare Award for Best Actor
1993	Prateeksha	Raja	
1993	Muqabla	Havaldar Suraj	
1993	Zakhmo Ka Hisaab	Suraj Kumar	
1993	Aadmi Khilona Hai	Sharad Verma	
1993	Bhagyawan	Amar	
1993	Teri Payal Mere Geet	Premi	
1994	Raja Babu	Raja Babu	
1994	Dulaara	Raja	
1994	Prem Shakti	Gangwa/Krishna	
1994	Khuddar	Siddanth Suri	
1994	Ekka Raja Rani	Sagar	
1994	Aag	Birju/Raju	
1994	Brahma	Suraj	
1994	Beta Ho To Aisa	Raju	
1994	Andaz Apna Apna	Himself	Special appearance
1995	Andolan	Aniket	
1995	Hathkadi	Suraj Chauhan, Rajnikant	Double Role
1995	Kismat	Ajay	
1995	Coolie No. 1	Raju	Star Screen Award Special Jury Award; Nominated – Filmfare Best Actor Award
1995	Rock Dancer	Rajveer Randhawa	Special appearance
1995	The Gambler	Dayashankar Pandey	
1996	Apne Dam Par	Himself	Special appearance
1996	Saajan Chale Sasural	Shyamsunder	Nominated- Filmfare Award for Best Actor; Filmfare Special Award
1996	Maahir	Bhola	
1996	Zordaar	Ravi	
1996	Chhote Sarkar	Amar/Rohit	
1997	Hero No. 1	Rajesh Malhotra	
1997	Agnichakra	Amar	
1997	Banarasi Babu	Gopi	
1997	Do Ankhen Barah Hath	Sagar	
1997	Loha	Govinda	Special appearance
1997	Deewana Mastana	Bunnu	Nominated – Filmfare Best Actor Award
1997	Naseeb	Krishna Prasad	
1997	Kaun Rokega Mujhe	Inspector Iqbal	Special appearance
1998	Aunty No. 1	Gopi (Kanaklakshmi / Ranjit Sehgal)	
1998	Achanak	Arjun	
1998	Dulhe Raja	Raja	Zee Cine Award for Best Actor in a Comic Role
1998	Maharaja	Kohinoor Karan	
1998	Bade Miyan Chote Miyan	Pyare Mohan, Chhote Miyan	Double role Zee Cine Award for Best Actor in a Comic Role; Nominated – Filmfare Best Actor Award
1998	Pardesi Babu	Raju Pardesi	
1999	Anari No.1	Rahul Saxena, Raja	Double role
1999	Rajaji	Rajaji	
1999	Haseena Maan Jaayegi	Monu/Chachaji	Filmfare Best Comedian Award; Zee Cine Award for Best Actor in a Comic RoleNominated - IIFA Best Actor Award
1999	Hum Tum Pe Marte Hain	Rahul Malhotra	
2000	Hadh Kar Di Aapne	Raju; Raju's mother; Raju's father; Raju's sister; Raju's grandfather; Raju's grandmother	Six roles
2000	Joru Ka Ghulam	Raja	
2000	Kunwara	Raju	Nominated -Filmfare Award for Best Performance in a Comic Role
2000	Shikari	Om Srivastav/Mahendra Pratap Singh	Nominated – Filmfare Best Villain Award
2000	Jis Desh Mein Ganga Rehta Hain	Ganga	
2000	Beti No. 1	Bharat Bhatnagar	
2001	Censor	Himself	Special appearance
2001	Jodi No.1	Veeru	IIFA Best Comedian Award; Nominated -Filmfare Award for Best Performance in a Comic Role
2001	Albela	Tony	
2001	Dil Ne Phir Yaad Kiya	Prem	
2001	Kyo Kii... Main Jhuth Nahin Bolta	Raj Malhotra	Nominated -Filmfare Award for Best Performance in a Comic Role
2001	Aamdani Atthani Kharcha Rupaiyaa	Bhishma	
2002	Pyaar Diwana Hota Hai	Sunder	
2002	Akhiyon Se Goli Maare	Raj Oberoi	Nominated -Filmfare Award for Best Performance in a Comic Role
2002	Waah! Tera Kya Kehna	Raj Oberoi, Banne Khan	Double role
2002	Chalo Ishq Ladaaye	Pappu	
2003	Ek Aur Ek Gyarah	Tara	
2003	Three Roses	Himself	Tamil film; cameo appearance
2003	Raja Bhaiya	Raja Bhaiya	
2005	Khullam Khulla Pyaar Karen	Raja / Vicky	
2005	Ssukh	Chandraprakash Sharma	
2006	Sandwich	Shekhar / Sher Singh, Vicky Chopra	Double role
2006	Bhagam Bhag	Babla	
2007	Salaam-e-Ishq: A Tribute to Love	Raju	
2007	Jahan Jaaeyega Hamen Paaeyega	Karan / Bobby Singh / Sher Khan	
2007	Partner	Bhaskar Diwakar Chaudhary	IIFA Best Comedian Award; Zee Cine Award for Best Actor in a Supporting Role – Male; Star Gold Excellent Comic Actor Award; MTV Lycra Style Most Stylish Comeback Award; NDTV Imagine Best Jodi of the Year with Salman Khan Nominated - IIFA Best Actor Award
2007	Om Shanti Om	Himself	Special appearance
2008	Humsey Hai Jahaan		Special appearance
2008	Money Hai Toh Honey Hai	Bobby Arora	
2009	Chal Chala Chal	Deepak	
2009	Life Partner	Jeet Oberoi	Nominated – IIFA Best Comedian Award
2009	Wanted	Himself	Special appearance
2009	Do Knot Disturb	Raj	
2010	Raavan	Sanjeevani Kumar	
2011	Naughty @ 40	Sanjeev Srivastav	
2011	Loot	Pandit	
2012	Delhi Safari	Bajrangi (voice)	
2013	Deewana Main Deewana	Basant	
2013	Samadhi	Deputy Inspector General of Police	Bengali film
2014	Holiday	Sr. Commanding Officer Pratap	Special appearance
2014	Kill Dil	Bhaiyaji	Stardust Award for Best Supporting Actor
2014	Happy Ending	Armaan Malik	Stardust Award for Best Supporting Actor
2015	Hey Bro		Special appearance
2017	Aa Gaya Hero	ACP Ravindra Varma	Also producer
2018	FryDay	Gagan Kapoor	
2019	Rangeela Raja	Vijendra Pratap Singh, Ajay Pratap Singh	Double role
2022	Naam Tha Kanhaiyalal	Himself	Documentary

== Television ==
Year	Title	Role(s)	Ref.
2001	Jeeto Chappar Phaad Ke	Host	
2014	DID Super Moms Season 2	Judge	
2016; 2018; 2021	Dance Bangla Dance	Judge	
