= List of Hindi films of 1988 =

This is a list of films produced by the Bollywood film industry based in Mumbai in 1988.

== Highest-grossing films ==
The three highest-grossing films at the Indian box office in 1988:

Rank	Title	Gross collection
1	Tezaab	₹16 crore
2	Shahenshah	₹12 crore
3	Paap Ki Duniya	₹9.5 crore

== Films ==
=== List of released films ===
Title	Director	Cast	Genre	Composer	YouTube link
Aag Ke Sholay	S. R. Pratap	Hemant Birje, Gulshan Grover, Vijayata Pandit	Drama, action	Vijay	https://www.youtube.com/watch?v=YfVwWPoZm94
Aage Ki Soch	Dada Kondke	Dada Kondke, Huma Khan, Shakti Kapoor, Satish Shah, Raja Murad	Comedy	Raamlaxman	
Aaj Ka Robin Hood	Tapan Sinha	Anil Chatterjee, Utpal Dutt, Robi Ghosh, Nana Patekar, Satish Shah	Drama, action	Tapan Sinha	
Aaj Ke Angaare	Vinod K. Verma	Archana Puran Singh, Hemant Birje, Raja Duggal, Rohini Hattangadi	Drama, action	Bappi Lahiri	https://www.youtube.com/watch?v=4ubk6iWHX0M
Aakhri Adaalat	Rajiv Mehra	Vinod Khanna, Dimple Kapadia, Jackie Shroff, Sonam	Action	Anu Malik	
Aakhri Nishchay	K. C. Agarwal	Surendra Pal	Action		
Abhishapt	Prakash Jha	Deepti Naval, Pyare Mohan Sahay, Vasant Joglekar	Drama		
Agnee	J. Om Prakash	Mithun Chakraborty, Chunky Pandey, Amrita Singh, Mandakini	Drama, action	Laxmikant–Pyarelal	
Akarshan	Tanvir Ahmed	Akbar Khan, Sonu Walia, Girish Karnad	Romance	Ajit Singh	
Akhri Muqabla	Sudesh C. Issar	Shashi Kapoor, Rajan Sippy, Suresh Oberoi	Action		
Andha Yudh	Dayal Nihalani	Raj Babbar, Nana Patekar, Pallavi Joshi, Divya Rana, Rohini Hattangadi	Drama, thriller	Ajit Varman	
Anjaam Khuda Jaane		Danny Denzongpa, Gulshan Grover, Imtiaz Khan			
Aurat Teri Yehi Kahani	Mohanjee Prasad	Raj Babbar, Meenakshi Seshadri, Raj Kiran, Aruna Irani	Drama	Anand–Milind	
Bahaar	Suraj Prakash	Raj Kiran, Rupini			
Bandhar Bahon Kaa		Raj Kiran			
Be Lagaam	Naval Kishore	Biswajeet, Rakesh Roshan, Jayshree T.			
Bedroom Story		Jayshree T.			
Bees Saal Baad	Rajkumar Kohli	Mithun Chakraborty, Dimple Kapadia, Meenakshi Seshadri	Action, horror	Laxmikant–Pyarelal	
Bhatakti Jawani	Inderjit Doshi	Mukri, Lalita Pawar			
Bhayaanak Mahal	Baby	Babu Antony, Ravi, Jaya Rekha	Horror		
Bhed Bhav	Navin Kumar	Pradeep Kumar			
Biwi Ho To Aisi	J. K. Bihari	Rekha, Salman Khan, Farooq Sheikh, Bindu, Kader Khan	Drama, family	Laxmikant–Pyarelal	
Charnon Ki Saugandh	K. Bapaiah	Asrani, Mithun Chakraborty, Prem Chopra, Amrita Singh	Action, drama, family	Laxmikant–Pyarelal	
Chintamani Surdas	Ram Pahwa	Rakesh Pandey			
Commando	B. Subhash	Mithun Chakraborty, Mandakini, Hemant Birje	Action, drama, romance	Bappi Lahiri	
Daisy	Pratap Pothan	Harish Kumar, Sonia, Lakshmi, Kamal Haasan	Drama	Shyam	
Dariya Dil	K. Ravishankar	Govinda, Kimi Katkar, Raj Kiran, Kader Khan, Shakti Kapoor	Drama, family	Rajesh Roshan	
Dayavan	Feroz Khan	Vinod Khanna, Feroz Khan, Amala, Madhuri Dixit, Aditya Pancholi	Action, drama, family	Laxmikant Pyarelal	
The Deceivers	Nicholas Meyer	Pierce Brosnan, Shashi Kapoor, Saeed Jaffrey, David Robb	Action, historical	John Scott	
Dharam Shatru	Harmesh Malhotra	Shatrughan Sinha, Reena Roy, Nirupa Roy			
Dharamyudh	Sudarshan Nag	Shatrughan Sinha, Sunil Dutt, Kimi Katkar	Drama	Rajesh Roshan	
Do Waqt Ki Roti	Satpal	Feroz Khan, Sanjeev Kumar, Reena Roy, Sulakshana Pandit	Action	Laxmikant Pyarelal	
Ek Aadmi	Khwaja Ahmad Abbas	Shabana Azmi, Parikshit Sahni, Tun Tun	Drama		
Ek Hi Maqsad	Pravin Bhatt	Om Puri, Divya Rana, Danny Denzongpa, Rakesh Bedi, Satish Shah	Action, drama, thriller	Pankaj Udhas	
Ek Naya Rishta	Vinod Pande	Rekha, Raj Kiran, Mazhar Khan	Family	Mohammed Zahur Khayyam	
Faisla	S. Ramanathan	Saira Banu, Bindu, Vinod Khanna	Drama	R. D. Burman	
Falak	Shashilal K. Nair	Rakhee Gulzar, Jackie Shroff, Shekhar Kapur	Action, crime, drama, family		
Ganga Tere Desh Mein	Vijay Reddi	Raj Babbar, Dharmendra, Dimple Kapadia, Jaya Prada, Kader Khan, Shatrughan Sinha	Action, drama		
Gangaa Jamunaa Saraswati	Manmohan Desai	Amitabh Bachchan, Mithun Chakraborty, Jaya Prada, Meenakshi Seshadri, Amrish Puri	Action, drama, family, crime, adventure	Anu Malik	
Ghar Aakir Ghar Hai		Javed Khan, Rajesh Puri			
Ghar Ghar Ki Kahani	Kalpataru	Govinda, Farha Naaz, Rishi Kapoor, Jaya Prada	Drama, comedy, family	Bappi Lahiri	
Ghar Mein Ram Gali Mein Shyam	Subhash Soni	Govinda, Neelam Kothari, Anupam Kher, Johnny Lever	Drama, family, action, comedy		
Gharwali Baharwali	Sripathi Panditharadhyula Rajaram	Chandrashekhar, Ramesh Deo, Satyendra Kapoor	Family		
Gunahon Ka Faisla	Shibu Mitra	Shatrughan Sinha, Dimple Kapadia, Chunky Pandey, Danny Denzongpa, Gulshan Grover, Pran	Action	Bappi Lahiri	
Gunahon Ke Shatranj	Chandrakant Sangani				
Halaal Ki Kamai	Swaroop Kumar	Govinda, Farha Naaz, Sonika Gill, Shakti Kapoor, Gulshan Grover	Family, action	Bappi Lahiri	
Halla Gulla					
Hamara Khandaan	Anwar Pasha	Rishi Kapoor, Farha Naaz, Kiran Juneja	Drama, romance		
Hatya	Kirti Kumar	Govinda, Neelam Kothari, Anupam Kher	Action, crime, thriller	Bappi Lahiri	
Hum Farishte Nahin	Jatin Kumar	Raj Babbar, Smita Patil, Om Puri, Poonam Dhillon	Action, thriller	Manoj–Gyan	
Hum To Chale Pardes	Ravindra Peepat	Rajiv Kapoor, Shashi Kapoor, Kulbhushan Kharbanda	Drama		
Insaaf Ki Jung		Shafi Inamdar, Priya Tendulkar			
Insaaf Ki Manzil		Bhushan Jeevan, Shekhar Suman			
Insaniyat		Kimi Katkar			
Inteqam	Rajkumar Kohli	Sunny Deol, Anil Kapoor, Meenakshi Seshadri, Kimi Katkar, Kader Khan	Drama	Laxmikant–Pyarelal	
Jai Karoli Maa	Ram Pahlwa	Arun Govil, Amrit Pal, Urmila Bhatt	Devotional		
Janam Janam	Vijay Sadanah	Rishi Kapoor, Danny Denzongpa, Amrish Puri	Drama		
Jawani Ki Lahren		Manmauji, Rakesh Pandey			
Jeete Hain Shaan Se	Kawal Sharma	Mithun Chakraborty, Sanjay Dutt, Govinda, Mandakini, Vijeta Pandit, Danny Denzongpa	Action	Anu Malik	
Jungle Ki Beti	R. Thakkar	Rakesh Bedi, Joginder Shelly	Adventure		
Kaal Chakra		Sadashiv Amrapurkar, Madan Jain, Suresh Oberoi			
Kab Tak Chup Rahungi	T. Prakash Rao	Amala Akkineni, Aditya Pancholi, Kiran Kumar, Kader Khan	Drama	Bappi Lahiri	
Kabrastan	Mohan Bhakri	Hemant Birje, Kunika, Amjad Khan, Jagdeep, Raza Murad	Horror	Jagdish Khanna	
Kabzaa	Mahesh Bhatt	Sanjay Dutt, Amrita Singh, Paresh Rawal, Raj Babbar	Action	Rajesh Roshan	
Kanwarlal	S. S. Ravichandra	Jeetendra, Raj Babbar, Sujata Mehta, Amjad Khan	Action	Bappi Lahiri	
Kasam	Umesh Mehra	Anil Kapoor, Poonam Dhillon	Action, drama		
Kharidar		Daljit Kaur, Paresh Rawal, Sarika			
Khatron Ke Khiladi	T. Rama Rao	Dharmendra, Sanjay Dutt, Chunky Pandey, Madhuri Dixit, Neelam Kothari, Shakti Kapoor, Sadashiv Amrapurkar	Action, comedy, crime, drama	Laxmikant–Pyarelal	
Khoon Bahaa Ganga Mein	Pravin Bhatt	Avtar Gill, Annu Kapoor, Bharat Kapoor	Action		
Khoon Bhari Maang	Rakesh Roshan	Rekha, Kabir Bedi, Sonu Walia	Action, drama, thriller		
Lathi					
Libaas	Gulzar	Shabana Azmi, Naseeruddin Shah, Raj Babbar, Annu Kapoor	Drama	Rahul Dev Burman	
Maalamaal	Kewal Sharma	Naseeruddin Shah, Poonam Dhillon, Mandakini, Satish Shah	Comedy	Anu Malik	
Maar Dhaad	Yesh Chauhan	Navin Nischol, Hemant Birje, Mandakini	Action		
Mahakali		Farha Naaz, Master Rinku			
Mahaveera	Naresh Saigal	Dharmendra, Raaj Kumar, Dimple Kapadia, Raj Babbar, Shatrughan Sinha, Vinod Mehra	Action	Kalyanji-Anandji	
Main Zinda Hoon	Sudhir Mishra	Rajendra Gupta, Pankaj Kapur, Deepti Naval, Alok Nath	Drama	Sharang Dev	
Mar Mitenge	Kawal Sharma	Jeetendra, Mithun Chakraborty, Bhanupriya, Madhavi, Amrish Puri, Kader Khan, Shakti Kapoor	Drama, action	Laxmikant–Pyarelal	
Mardangi	S. R. Pratap	Aman Virk, Hemant Birje, Dara Singh	Drama		
Mardon Wali Baat	Brij	Dharmendra, Sanjay Dutt, Jaya Prada, Shabana Azmi, Danny Denzongpa	Action, drama	R. D. Burman	
Mera Muqaddar		Prem Chopra, Kulbhushan Kharbanda, Tanuja	Drama		
Mera Shikar	Keshu Ramsay	Kabir Bedi, Dimple Kapadia, Navin Nischol	Action		
Mere Baad	Vishwamitra	Rakhee Gulzar, Anupam Kher	Drama		
Mohabbat Ke Dushman	Prakash Mehra	Raaj Kumar, Hema Malini, Sanjay Dutt, Farha Naaz, Poonam Dhillon	Action, thriller	Kalyanji Anandji	
Mohre	Raghuvir Kul	Nana Patekar, Madhuri Dixit, Sadashiv Amrapurkar	Drama	Vanraj Bhatia	
Mulzim	K.S.R. Doss	Jeetendra, Shatrughan Sinha, Hema Malini, Kimi Katkar, Amrita Singh, Suresh Oberoi, Kader Khan	Drama, action	Bappi Lahiri	
Namumkin	Hrishikesh Mukherjee	Raj Babbar, Vinod Mehra, Zeenat Aman, Sanjeev Kumar	Drama, mystery	R. D. Burman	
New Delhi	Joshiy	Jeetendra, Sumalatha	Thriller		
Om-Dar-B-Dar	Kamal Swaroop	Gopi Desai, Manish Gupta, Anita Kanwar	Postmodernist		
Paanch Fauladi	Mohan Bhakri	Raj Babbar, Javed Khan, Dara Singh, Salma Agha, Anita Raj	Action	Uttam-Jagdish	
Paap Ki Duniya	Shibu Mitra	Sunny Deol, Neelam Kothari, Chunky Pandey, Danny Denzongpa, Pran, Shakti Kapoor	Action	Bappi Lahiri	
Paap Ko Jalaa Kar Raakh Kar Doonga	K.R. Reddy	Dharmendra, Govinda, Anita Raj, Farha Naaz, Sadashiv Amrapurkar, Shakti Kapoor	Action	Ravindra Jain	
Parbat Ke Us Paar	Raman Kumar	Rakesh Bedi, Abhinav Chaturvedi, Avtar Gill	Romance	Mohammed Zahur Khayyam	
Pehla Kadam	Ketan Mehta				
Pestonjee	Vijaya Mehta	Anupam Kher, Naseeruddin Shah, Shabana Azmi, Cyprus Dastoor, Dady Dustoor	Comedy, drama	Vanraj Bhatia	
Pushpak	Singeetham Srinivasa Rao	Kamal Haasan, Amala, Tinnu Anand	Silent, comedy	L. Vaidyanathan	
Pyaar Ka Mandir	K. Bapaiah	Mithun Chakraborty, Madhavi, Nirupa Roy, Raj Kiran, Shoma Anand, Kader Khan	Drama, family	Laxmikant Pyarelal	
Pyaar Mohabbat	Ajay Kashyap	Rakhee Gulzar, Govinda, Mandakini, Shakti Kapoor, Kader Khan	Romance	Laxmikant–Pyarelal	
Pyaasi Atma	Ismail Inamdar, A.K. Misra	Lalita Pawar, Rajesh Puri	Horror		
Qasoor Kiska					
Qatil	Ashok Gaikwad	Aditya Pancholi, Sangeeta Bijlani, Kiran Kumar, Amjad Khan, Raza Murad, Vikram Gokhale, Shakti Kapoor	Action	Laxmikant–Pyarelal	
Qayamat Se Qayamat Tak	Mansoor Khan	Aamir Khan, Juhi Chawla, Dalip Tahil, Alok Nath, Goga Kapoor, Rajendranath Zutshi, Reema Lagoo	Romance	Anand–Milind	
Raj Dulari	Dinesh Thakur				
Ram-Avtar	Sunil Hingorani	Sunny Deol, Anil Kapoor, Sridevi	Drama	Laxmikant–Pyarelal	
Rama O Rama	Mirza Brothers	Raj Babbar, Kimi Katkar, Aasif Sheikh, Pran, Gulshan Grover	Action, drama, romance	R. D. Burman	
Rihaee	Arunara	Vinod Khanna, Hema Malini, Naseeruddin Shah, Neena Gupta, Pallavi Joshi	Drama	Shaarang Dev	
Rukhsat	Simi Garewal	Mithun Chakraborty, Simi Garewal, Anuradha Patel, Marc Zuber, Amrish Puri	Romance	Kalyanji-Anandji	
Saazish	Rajkumar Kohli	Raaj Kumar, Mithun Chakraborty, Dharmendra, Dimple Kapadia, Anita Raj, Raj Babbar, Vinod Mehra, Amrish Puri, Kader Khan, Shakti Kapoor	Action, suspense	Kalyanji-Anandji	
Sagar Sangam	Dulal Guha	Mithun Chakraborty, Shatrughan Sinha, Padmini Kolhapure, Anita Raj, Raakhee Gulzar, Asha Parekh	Drama	Bappi Lahiri	
Salaam Bombay!	Mira Nair	Nana Patekar, Raghuvir Yadav, Anita Kanwar, Irrfan Khan	Drama	L. Subramaniam	
Shahenshah	Tinnu Anand	Amitabh Bachchan, Meenakshi, Amrish Puri, Pran, Prem Chopra, Kader Khan	Action	Amar-Utpal	
Sherni	Harmesh Malhotra	Sridevi, Shatrughan Sinha, Pran, Kader Khan, Jagdeep	Action	Kalyanji-Anandji	
Shesh	Amit Khanna				
Shiv Shakti		Govinda, Gulshan Grover, Kimi Katkar, Shatrughan Sinha, Anita Raj, Anupam Kher	Action, drama		
Shukriyaa	A. C. Tirulokchandar	Rajiv Kapoor, Amrita Singh, Asrani			
Sila	B. R. Ishara				
Siyasat	Mahesh Bhatt	Neelam Kothari			
Sone Pe Suhaaga	K. Bapaiah	Jeetendra, Dharmendra, Nutan, Anil Kapoor, Poonam Dhillon, Sridevi, Kimi Katkar, Anupam Kher, Kader Khan	Action, family	Bappi Lahiri	
Soorma Bhopali	Jagdeep	Jagdeep, Amitabh Bachchan, Dharmendra, Rekha	Drama	Dilip Sen-Sameer Sen	
Tamacha	Ramesh Ahuja	Jeetendra, Rajinikanth, Amrita Singh, Kimi Katkar, Bhanupriya, Sumeet Saigal, Anupam Kher	Action, romance	Bappi Lahiri	
Tamas	Govind Nihalani	Om Puri, Deepa Sahi	Historical drama		
Taqdeer Ka Tamasha	Anand Gaekwad	Sadashiv Amrapurkar, Moushumi Chatterjee, Suresh Chatwal, Kimi Katkar, Jeetendra, Govinda	Action, crime, drama		
Tera Naam Mera Naam	Ramesh Talwar	Suparna Anand, Tanvi Azmi, Shafi Inamdar	Romantic comedy		
Tezaab	N. Chandra	Anil Kapoor, Madhuri Dixit, Chunky Pandey, Mandakini, Kiran Kumar, Suresh Oberoi, Anupam Kher	Action, romance	Laxmikant–Pyarelal	
Tohfa Mohabbat Ka	Ram Govind	Govinda, Kimi Katkar, Hema Malini	Drama	Anup Jalota	
Trishagni	Nabendu Ghosh	Nana Patekar, Pallavi Joshi, Alok Nath, Nitish Bharadwaj	Historical drama	Salil Chowdhury	
Udbhav	T. S. Ranga	Pranay Agrawal, Mamta Rao			
Veerana	Shyam Ramsay, Tulsi Ramsay	Hemant Birje, Jasmin, Sahila Chadha, Kulbhushan Kharbanda, Satish Shah, Vijayendra Ghatge, Rajendra Nath	Horror	Bappi Lahiri	
Vijay	Yash Chopra	Rajesh Khanna, Anil Kapoor, Rishi Kapoor, Raj Babbar, Hema Malini, Meenakshi Seshadri, Sonam, Moushumi Chatterjee, Anupam Kher, Saeed Jaffrey	Action, drama	Shiv-Hari	
Waaris	Ravindra Peepat	Smita Patil, Amrita Singh, Raj Babbar, Raj Kiran, Amrish Puri, Kulbhushan Kharbanda	Drama	Uttam-Jagadish	
Waqt Ki Awaz	K. Bapaiah	Mithun Chakraborty, Sridevi, Neelam Kothari, Moushumi Chatterjee, Kader Khan, Shakti Kapoor, Gulshan Grover	Action, crime, drama	Bappi Lahiri	
Woh Phir Aayegi	B. R. Ishara	Rajesh Khanna, Farha Naaz, Moon Moon Sen, Shekhar Suman, Archana Puran Singh, Javed Jaffrey	Horror	Anand Milind	
Yateem	J. P. Dutta	Sunny Deol, Farha Naaz, Danny Denzongpa, Amrish Puri, Sujata Mehta, Dalip Tahil	Action, drama	Laxmikant–Pyarelal	
Yeh Pyar Nahin					
Zakhmi Aurat	Avtar Bhogal	Dimple Kapadia, Raj Babbar	Action		
Zalzala	Harish Shah	Dharmendra, Shatrughan Sinha, Rati Agnihotri, Kimi Katkar, Rajiv Kapoor, Danny Denzongpa, Anita Raj, Vijeta Pandit, Gulshan Grover	Action	Rahul Dev Burman	
Zinda Jala Doonga	Kiran Kumar				
Zulm Ko Jala Doonga	Mahendra Shah	Naseeruddin Shah, Kiran Kumar	Action	Nadeem-Shravan	

== See also ==
- List of Hindi films of 1987
- List of Hindi films of 1989
