= Shiva Rindani =

Indian actor (born 1964)

- Born: Mukesh Rindani
- Occupation: Actor
- Years active: 1984–present

Shiva Rindani (born Mukesh Rindani) is an Indian actor who appeared in Hindi films - mostly - in either villainous roles or in comic roles.

He has appeared in more than 100 films. His latest film was Deshdrohi in 2008, and Hum as Captain Attack and Ghatak: Lethal.

== Filmography ==
=== Films ===
Year	Film	Role Played	Notes
1984	Ghar Ek Mandir		
1985	Mera Jawab	Bunty	
1987	Hamari Jung	Shiva	
1987	Dadagiri	Vicky	
1987	Dance Dance	Molestor	
1987	Khooni Mahal	Shiva	
1988	Hum Farishte Nahin	Babu	
1988	Shiv Shakti	Girija	
1988	Shukriyaa	Shiva	
1988	Qayamat Se Qayamat Tak	Balwant Singh	
1988	Commando	Shiva, Security Guard	
1988	Zulm Ko Jala Doonga		
1988	Hum To Chale Pardes	Eve Teaser in Kashmir	
1988	Halaal Ki Kamai	Babu	
1988	Zakhmi Aurat	Ranjit	
1988	Aag Ke Sholay	Daku Bhupat Singh	
1988	Maar Dhaad	Arun	
1988	Rama O Rama	Johny D'Souza	
1988	Bees Saal Baad (1988 film)	Badal	
1989	Farz Ki Jung	Shekhar	
1989	Gair Kanooni	Man Planted Bomb In Car	Uncredited role
1989	Mera Naseeb	Javed	
1989	Aakhri Ghulam	Jaggu Brother	
1989	Hisaab Khoon Ka	False Police Constable	
1989	Gentleman	Ramsay henchmen as Shiva	
1989	Lashkar (film)	Sangraam Goon as Shiva	
1989	Sindoor Aur Bandook	Pratap	
1989	Hum Intezaar Karenge	Shankar	
1989	Aakhri Baazi	Shiva	
1989	Paanch Paapi	Chaudhary Raghuveer Singh's son	
1990	Taqdeer Ka Tamasha	Shiva	
1990	Shandaar	Daboo	
1990	Izzatdaar	Shiva	
1990	Aaj Ke Shahenshah		
1990	Sher Dil	Ranjeet Sidekick	
1990	Awaragardi	Dharma Friend	
1990	Jungle Love	Karma	
1990	Kanoon Ki Zanjeer		
1990	Khatarnaak	Shiva	
1990	Andher Gardi		
1991	Hatyarin	Baldev	
1991	Jungle Queen		
1991	Hum (film)	Captain Zaatack /Attack	
1991	Deshwasi	Shiva	
1991	Naya Zaher	Babu	
1991	Pratikar	Shiva	
1991	Raiszaada	Munna Thakur	
1991	Swarg Jaisaa Ghar	Chaman	
1992	Vajraghat		
1992	Sanam Aap Ki Khaatir		
1992	Giraft		
1992	Geet Milan Ke Gaate Rahenge		
1992	Mere Sajana Saath Nibhana	Thakur Ranjit Pratap Singh	
1992	Virodhi	Corrupt Police Inspector Nagraj	
1992	Jaagruti	Mahesh	
1992	Roja (film)	Wasim Khan	
1992	Isi Ka Naam Zindagi	Shera	
1992	Tilak	Lakhna	
1992	Dil Aashna Hai	Kidnapper	
1993	Zakhmi Rooh	Sanki	
1993	Krishan Avtaar		
1993	Pyar Pyar	Monty	
1993	Police Wala		
1993	Chor Aur Chaand	Ranga	
1993	Aaja Meri Jaan	Charlie	
1993	Boyfriend	Ajit	
1993	Chandra Mukhi	Bob	
1993	Gopalaa	Shemaroo	
1994	Aag Aur Chingaari	Mangal Singh	
1994	Zamane Se Kya Darna	Gypsy	
1994	Ekka Raja Rani	Raageshwar	
1994	Eena Meena Deeka	Bhujang's Son	
1994	Fauj	Thakur Yuvraj Singh's (Kiran Kumar) second son	
1994	Janta Ki Adalat	Corrupt Police Inspector	
1994	Kranti Kshetra	Shankara	
1994	Main Khiladi Tu Anari	Goli's Henchman	
1994	Ikke Pe Ikka	Kunthi Putra	
1994	Udhaar Ki Zindagi	Arjun	
1994	Gopi Kishan	Sharad	
1994	Zaalim	Gaekwad	
1994	Sangdil Sanam	Sherkhan Pathan	
1995	God and Gun	Raghu	
1995	Paandav	David	
1995	Nazar Ke Samne	Jimmy	
1995	Aatank Hi Aatank	Ganga's Killer	
1995	The Gambler	Babu Kaniya	
1995	Sanam Harjai	Ruffian	
1996	Vijeta	Pratap Sharma	
1996	Ek Tha Raja	Chhotey	
1996	Jaan	Dilawar	
1996	Daraar	Rony	
1996	Muqadama	Bablu	
1996	Krishna	Safed Ghoda/Pandu	
1996	Daanveer		
1996	Ghatak: Lethal	Chandru	
1996	Khoon Ki Pyasi	Surinder	
1997	Ganga Maange Khoon		
1997	Salma Pe Dil Aa Gaya	Halaku	
1997	Mohabbat Ki Aag	Suresh Rastogi	
1997	Ghoonghat	Hajam	
1997	Do Rahain	Military Commando Chief Roy	
1997	Lahoo Ke Do Rang	Salim Surti	
1997	Suraj	Police Inspector Shakti Singh	
1997	Mohabbat (1997 film)	Shiva	Special Appearance at the beginning
1997	Deewana Mastana	Goon in the Pub	
1997	Bhai	Nepali Goon	
1998	Jaane Jigar	Chhotey	
1998	Aakrosh	Goonga/Girdhari	
1998	Hitler	Corrupt Deputy Jailer	
1998	Humse Badhkar Kaun	Johnny	
1998	Barood	Shiva	
1998	Zulm-O-Sitam	Rana	
1998	Bade Miyan Chote Miyan		
1998	Phool Bane Patthar	Shiva	
1999	Sikandar Sadak Ka		
1999	Aakhri Raat		
1999	International Khiladi	Rapist in Train	
1999	Hogi Pyaar Ki Jeet	Dum Dum	
1999	Phool Aur Aag	Shiva	
1999	Maa Kasam	Thakur Khadak Singh	
2000	Rahasya		
2000	Chehron Ke Pichhe		
2000	Daku Maharani	Police Inspector Tejaa	
2000	Aaghaaz	Suku	
2000	Kaali Ki Saugandh	Badlu	
2000	Billa No. 786	Kaalu Tagda	
2001	Hum Deewane Pyar Ke	Suresh	
2001	Arjun Devaa	Aslam Pathan	
2001	Zakhmi Sherni		
2001	Khooni Tantrik	Rajan	
2001	Ittefaq	Banta	
2001	Indian	Police Inspector Patil	
2001	Dubai	Mansoor	Debut In Malayalam
2001	Praja	Arun Naik	Malayalam Movie
2002	Kranti	Zafardari	
2003	Janasheen	Chang	
2004	Mere Biwi Ka Jawab Nahin	G.G.	
2013	Raqt		Debut Film As A Director
2019	Kandy Twist		Also Director
2022	Monica, O My Darling	Tamang Rana	
2025	Kesari Veer	Qazi	

== Television ==
Year	Serial	Role	Channel	Notes
1993	Junoon	Mukhtyar	DD National	
1997	Saturday Suspense	Duplicate (Episode 11)	Zee TV	
1998	Zee Horror Show		Zee TV	
1999–2000	Gul Sanobar		DD National	
1999-2001	Jai Ganesha	Tripurasur	Zee TV	
2001	Ssshhhh...Koi Hai	Woh Koun Thi-Durjan Singh/The Guide (Episode 14)/Jinn (Episode 25)	Star Plus	
2009	Black	Father D'Cunha	9X	
2011	Kaala Saaya	Father D'Cunha	Sahara One	Reprisal series of Black
2017-2018	Rudra Ke Rakshak	Gurukaal	Big Magic	
2022–2023	Kyunkii Tum Hi Ho	Bhanu Pratapsingh	Shemaroo Umang	Negative Role
