= Sher Dil (Indian film) =

- Directed by: Mohan Sehgal
- Produced by: Jagdish Sidana
- Starring: Dharmendra; Rishi Kapoor; Anita Raj; Kimi Katkar
- Music by: Laxmikant–Pyarelal
- Release date: 7 September 1990
- Country: India
- Language: Hindi

Sher Dil is a 1990 Indian Hindi-language film directed by Mohan Segal, stars Dharmendra, Rishi Kapoor, Anita Raj, Kimi Katkar, with Pradeep Kumar, Kader Khan, Gulshan Grover. The actor Kader Khan played the double role of Shobhraj and Lobhraj.

== Cast ==
- Dharmendra as Prakash Saxena / Professor Avinash Saxena / Shera
- Rishi Kapoor as Sanjay Saxena
- Anita Raj as Kiran
- Kimi Katkar as Jyoti
- Pradeep Kumar as Ram Kumar Saxena
- Rohini Hattangadi as Maya Saxena
- Kader Khan as Shobhraj / Lobhraj (Double Role)
- Gulshan Grover as Ranjeet
- Shiva Rindani as Ranjeet's Sidekick
- Prema Narayan as Julie
- Piloo J. Wadia as College Interviewer
- Praveen Kumar as Goon at Club
- Arjun as Rapist who molest Jyoti

== Soundtrack ==
#	Title	Singer
1	"Mauka Bhi Hai Fursat Bhi Hai"	Mohammed Aziz, Shailendra Singh, Kavita Krishnamurthy, Alka Yagnik
2	"Adi Ve Adi"	Kavita Krishnamurthy
3	"Tera Guroor Todunga"	Mohammed Aziz
4	"Aur Bhale Kuch Bhi"	Anuradha Paudwal
5	"Door Shehar Se"	Alisha Chinoy
