= Praveen Kumar Sobti =

Indian hammer and discus thrower, and actor (1947–2022)

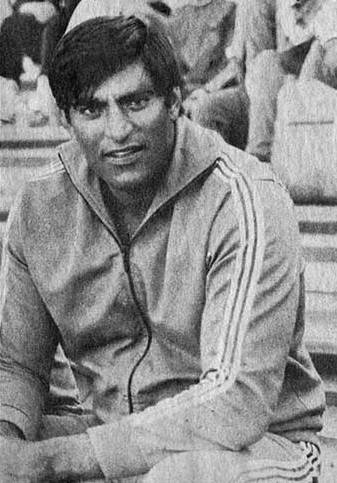
- Kumar at the 1974 Asian Games

Personal information
- Born: Praveen Kumar Sobti; 6 December 1947 Sarhali, Punjab, India
- Died: 7 February 2022 (aged 74) New Delhi, India
- Height: 6 ft 7 in (201 cm)
- Weight: 125 kg (276 lb)

Sport
- Sport: Athletics
- Events: Discus throw, Hammer throw

Achievements and titles
- Personal bests: DT – 56.74 m (1973); HT – 65.76 m (1969)
Medal record
Men's athletics
Representing India
Asian Games
Gold medal – first place	1966 Bangkok	Discus throw
Gold medal – first place	1970 Bangkok	Discus throw
Silver medal – second place	1974 Tehran	Discus throw
Bronze medal – third place	1966 Bangkok	Hammer throw
Asian Championships
Gold medal – first place	1975 Seoul	Discus throw
Silver medal – second place	1973 Marikina	Discus throw
Commonwealth Games
Silver medal – second place	1966 Kingston	Hammer throw

Praveen Kumar Sobti (6 December 1947 – 7 February 2022) was an Indian hammer and discus thrower, actor, politician, and soldier with Border Security Force (BSF). As a 20-year-old he joined then newly raised BSF where he attracted the attention of his officers through his fine athletic skills and went on to represent India at various athletic events in discus throw. As an athlete he won four medals at the Asian Games, including two gold medals, a silver medal in the Commonwealth Games and competed in two Olympics. As an actor, he starred in more than 50 Hindi films and played the famous character of Bhima in B.R. Chopra's television series Mahabharat that started in 1988. As a politician he contested the 2013 Delhi Legislative elections on an Aam Aadmi Party ticket, but lost.

== Sports ==
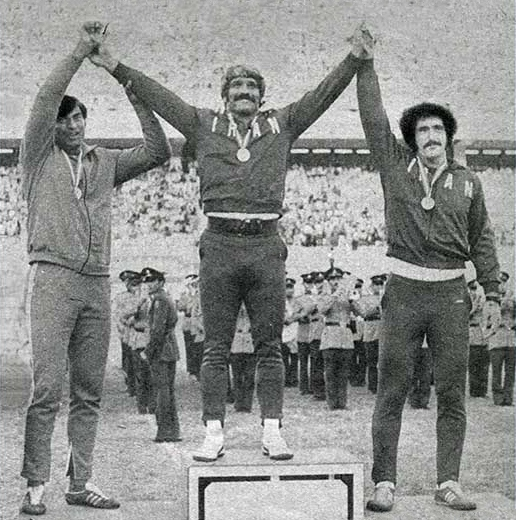
Kumar (left) at the 1974 Asian Games

Kumar was a star of Indian athletics in the 1960s and 1970s. He dominated the Indian hammer and discus throws for several years. He won gold medals in the discus throw at the 1966 and 1970 Asian Games, holding the Asian Games record of 56.76 metres. He was a silver medalist in the 1966 Commonwealth Games in Kingston and in the 1974 Asian Games in Tehran. He competed in the 1968 Summer Olympics and in the 1972 Summer Olympics.

== Cinematic journey ==
Praveen Kumar's debut film was Raksha, a James Bond style Bollywood movie starring Jeetendra with him playing a large henchman gorilla inspired by Jaws of The Spy Who Loved Me. He did similar role of Justin, a large henchman fighting against Jeetendra in Meri Awaz Suno.

Praveen Kumar earned national acclaim when he played the role "Bheem" in B R Chopra's popular mythological television serial Mahabharat, making him a household name. He played the role of "Saaboo" in Chacha Chaudhary (the TV series) for a large number of episodes.

After the Mahabharata serial, he got many acting roles in Indian films, though he cut down on his acting career, in order to launch his political career in Haryana and Delhi. He also acted in the famous comedy Tamil film Michael Madana Kama Rajan as a Body Guard.

Praveen Kumar was the actor to take the first blow of one of the most successful and famous punch dialogues of superstar Amitabh Bachchan, "Rishte Mein to Hum Tumhare Baap Hote hain, naam hai Shahenshah!" in Tinnu Anand's blockbuster Shahenshah. He played the semi-comedic role of the legendary "Mukhtar Singh", a drug dealer who later becomes a dairy owner, upon being beaten up by Shahenshah.

== Politics ==
In 2013 Kumar joined the Aam Aadmi Party (AAP). He contested the Delhi assembly elections from the Wazirpur constituency on an AAP ticket, but lost. The next year, he joined the Bharatiya Janata Party (BJP).

== Death ==
Praveen died from a heart attack in New Delhi on the night of 7 February 2022, at the age of 74.

== Filmography ==
=== Hindi films ===
Year	Film	Role	Notes
1981	Raksha	Gorilla	
1981	Meri Aawaz Suno	Justin	
1982	Ghazab	Henchman	
1983	Humse Na Jeeta Koi	Smuggler Lobo	
1983	Hum Se Hai Zamana	Killer	
1984	Lorie	Goon	
1984	Raaj Tilak	Daku Lashkar Singh	
1984	Hum Hain Lajawab	Henchman	
1984	Jagir	Django D'costa	
1985	Karishma Kudrat Kaa	Zorawar	
1985	Yudh	Xaca	
1985	Zabardast	Goon	
1985	Aakhir Kyon?	Goon	
1985	Maha Shaktimaan	Goon	
1986	Singhasan	Kaal Bhairav	
1986	Manav Hatya		
1986	Chambal Ka Baadshah	Daaku	
1986	Adhikar	Goon	
1986	Avinash	Street Goon	
1986	Raat Ke Baad	Zingagani	
1987	Naam O Nishan	Raaka	
1987	Khudgarz	Giant at Sports Club	
1987	Loha	Henchman	
1987	Hukumat	Goon	
1987	Dak Bangla	Ozo / Mummy	
1987	Diljalaa	Security Guard of girls hostel	
1987	Tera Karam Mera Dharam	Goon	
1988	Shahenshah	Mukhtaar Singh	
1988	Mohabbat Ke Dushman	Contract Killer	
1988	Commando	Henchman	
1988	Maalamaal	Jallad Singh	
1988	Agnee	Chief of the natives	
1988	Bees Saal Baad	Goon	
1988	Pyaar Mohabbat	Street Goon	
1988	Dukh-Dard	Henchman	
1989	Santosh	Kundan's Henchman	
1989	Mitti Aur Sona	Shingho	
1989	Ilaaka	Prisoner – Nagar's Henchman	
1989	Shehzaade	Street Gambler	
1989	Meri Zabaan	Wrestler	
1989	Lahu Ki Awaz	Killer	
1989	Elaan-E-Jung	Kala Naag's Henchman	
1990	Atishbaz	Kewal & Shamsher's Goon	
1990	Ghayal	Bheem Ji	Guest Role
1990	Aaj Ka Arjun	Thakur's Henchman	
1990	Kali Ganga	Hukumchand's Henchman	
1990	Sher Dil	Ranjeet's Henchman	
1990	Naaka Bandi	Henchman	
1990	Aag aur Angaray	Street Goon	
1991	Kohraam	Babbar Sher	
1991	Shankara	Goga	
1991	Ajooba	Vazir's Henchman	
1992	Panaah	Bheem	
1992	Humlaa	Sher Khan	
1992	Waqt Ka Badshah	Goon	
1994	Beta Ho To Aisa	Ranjith	
1996	Jaan	Goon	
1996	Ajay	Tiwari	
1997	Suryaputra Shanidev	Hanuman	
1998	Sham Ghansham	Goon	
1998	Train to Pakistan	Goon	
2013	Mahabharat Aur Barbareek	Bhima	

=== Other language films ===
Year	Film	Role	Language	Notes
1982	Pralaya Rudrudu	Bearhug	Telugu	
1986	Bhulekha	Moti	Punjabi	
1989	Raja Chinna Roja	Eye Patch Henchman	Tamil	
1990	Michael Madana Kama Rajan	Bheem	Tamil	
1994	Kishkinda Kanda	Truck Driver	Telugu	
1996	Indian	Knight King	Tamil	Special appearance in the song "maya maschindra"

=== Television ===
Year	Film	Role	Language	Notes
1988	Mahabharat	Bhima	Hindi	
1997	Mahabharat Katha	Bhima	Hindi	
