= Sarphira =

- Directed by: Ashok Gaikwad
- Written by: Zaheer. D. Lari (story and dialogues); Jyoti Swaroop (screenplay)
- Produced by: B. L. Khaitan
- Starring: Vinod Mehra; Sanjay Dutt; Madhavi; Kimi Katkar
- Cinematography: Anwar Siraj
- Edited by: Waman Bhonsle; Gurudutt Shirali
- Music by: R. D. Burman
- Production company: Khaitan International
- Distributed by: Shemaroo Entertainment
- Release date: 10 April 1992
- Country: India
- Language: Hindi

Sarphira is a 1992 Bollywood film directed by Ashok Gaikwad. The film stars Vinod Mehra, Sanjay Dutt, Madhavi, Kimi Katkar, Sumeet Saigal, Kiran Juneja, Shreeram Lagoo and Anupam Kher. The music was composed by R. D. Burman.

== Cast ==
- Vinod Mehra as Advocate Rajkishan Sinha
- Sanjay Dutt as Suresh Sinha
- Madhavi as Prema
- Kimi Katkar as Neetu
- Sumeet Saigal as Inspector Deepak Sinha
- Kiran Juneja as Advocate Shikha
- Shakti Kapoor as Rocky
- Anupam Kher as Balwant Singh / Balli Seth
- Shreeram Lagoo as Judge Brijkishore "B.K." Sinha
- Sushma Seth as Mrs. Sinha
- Anjan Srivastav as Police Commissioner Nekchand
- Renu Joshi as Seeta, Shikha's Mother
- Ashok Saraf as Thief Ganguram
- Beena Banerjee as Mrs. Singh: Balwant's wife; Rajkishan's mother (Dead)

== Soundtrack ==
All lyrics were written by Farooq Kaiser.

Song	Singer
"Deewane O Deewane"	Asha Bhosle
"Khwab Dekh Dekhke Zindagi Guzar Gayi"	Asha Bhosle, Mohammed Aziz
"Meri Honewali Bhabhi, Tumhe Dena Hoga"	Asha Bhosle, Amit Kumar
"Sardi Zukham Ka Hai Ek Hi Ilaaj"	Asha Bhosle, Suresh Wadkar
