= Meri Zabaan =

- Promotional Poster
- Directed by: Shibu Mitra
- Produced by: Veena Sharma; Vikas
- Starring: Mithun Chakraborty; Shashi Kapoor; Farha; Kimi Katkar; Tanuja; Vinod Mehra; Amjad Khan; Sharat Saxena; Rakesh Bedi
- Music by: Anu Malik
- Release date: 6 January 1989
- Running time: 140 minutes
- Country: India
- Language: Hindi

Meri Zabaan is a 1989 Indian Hindi-language action thriller film directed by Shibu Mitra. The film features an ensemble cast of Mithun Chakraborty, Shashi Kapoor, Amjad Khan, Vinod Mehra, Farah Naaz, Kimi Katkar and Tanuja.

== Plot ==
Meri Zubaan is an action thriller, featuring Mithun Chakraborty and Shashi Kapoor, supported by Farha, Kimi Katkar, Tanuja, Vinod Mehra and Amjad Khan.

== Cast ==
Actor	Character	Role	Notes		
Mithun Chakraborty	Krishna Singh				
Farah	Baby	Krishna's Love Interest			
Shashi Kapoor	Raja Vijay Singh	Terrorist/Negative Role			
Kimi Katkar	Rita	Interpol Agent	False Kimi, Liquoir Seller and Krishna's Lover		
Amjad Khan	Arjun Vaswani	CBI Officer	False Police Inspector Malpani		
Vinod Mehra	Vikram Singh	Reporter/News Editor	Parents of Krishna		
Tanuja	Mrs. Yashoda Singh	Vikram Singh's Wife	Parents of Krishna		
Ranjeet	Ranjeet Mehra		Parents of Baby		
Sarala Yeolekar	Mrs Mehra	Ranjeet Mehra's Wife	Parents of Baby		
Kamaldeep	Walia	Commissioner	Police Staffs		
Surendra Pal	Rakesh Malhotra	Inspector	Police Staffs		
Viju Khote	Damodar Singh	Constables	Police Staffs		
Ghanshyam Rohera	Mishra	Constables	Police Staffs	Amrit Pal	Jeeva
Rajan Haksar	Vijay Narayan	Jeeva Henchman			
Renu Joshi	Suzy	Jeeva's Keep and Caretaker of Baby			
Rakesh Bedi	Kaushik				
Raj Kishore	Darpan Khurana	Bar Tender			
Beena Banerjee	Asha Devi	Mental Hospital Doctor			
Praveen Kumar	Mukhtar Singh	Pahelwan			
Birbal	Balraj	Medical Stores keeper			
Tej Sapru	Pinto		Special Appearances and Guest Roles		
Mac Mohan	Mac	Pinto's Gang Members	Special Appearances and Guest Roles		
Javed Khan Amrohi	Ramesh	Pinto's Gang Members	Special Appearances and Guest Roles		
Jagdish Raj	Jaggi	Raja Vijay Singh's Gang Members	Special Appearances and Guest Roles		
Sharat Saxena	Ratan	Raja Vijay Singh's Gang Members	Special Appearances and Guest Roles		
Bhushan Tiwari	Chiranjilal	Raja Vijay Singh's Gang Members	Special Appearances and Guest Roles		
Gurubachan Singh	Jaggu	Raja Vijay Singh's Gang Members	Special Appearances and Guest Roles		

== Soundtrack ==
Song	Singer
"Honthon Pe Naam"	Asha Bhosle
"Dam Maara"	Asha Bhosle, Anu Malik
"Yeh Bhi Mujhe Chahe"	Alisha Chinai, Anu Malik
"Zindagi Pyar Ka" (Solo)	Anuradha Paudwal
"Zindagi Pyar Ka" (Duet)	Anuradha Paudwal, Mohammed Aziz
"Jhoolelal"	Amit Kumar, Anup Jalota
