= Khooni Raat =

- Directed by: J.D. Lawrence
- Written by: Salim Hyder
- Starring: Javed Khan; Beena Banerjee; Huma Khan; Om Shivpuri
- Release date: 1991

Khooni Raat is a 1991 Bollywood horror film starring Javed Khan Beena Banerjee and Huma Khan. It was rated 3 out of 5 stars. It is written and directed by J.D. Lawrence.

== Plot ==
Khooni Raat is a 1989 Indian Bollywood horror film directed by Kundan Kumar. The movie revolves around Ravi (played by Vikas Anand), a writer who is trying to overcome his writer's block. He moves to a new apartment, hoping that the change of environment will help him to get back to writing. Ravi's life is marked by his struggles with his career and his relationships. He is haunted by the ghost of his ex-girlfriend, Rohini (played by Divya Rana), who died under mysterious circumstances. Rohini's spirit is trapped between the world of the living and the dead, and she is desperate to communicate with Ravi. As Ravi settles into his new apartment, he starts to experience strange and unexplained events. He begins to see Rohini's ghostly apparition everywhere, and he starts to feel a strange connection to her. Despite his initial reluctance, Ravi starts to investigate the circumstances of Rohini's death, hoping to uncover the truth behind her tragic demise. As Ravi delves deeper into the mystery, he discovers that Rohini was murdered by her husband, who was driven by jealousy and possessiveness. The husband, played by Tej Sapru, is a ruthless and cunning individual who will stop at nothing to keep his dark secrets buried. The movie builds up to a thrilling climax, where Ravi confronts the evil spirit of Rohini's husband and uncovers the truth behind the Khooni Raat (Bloody Night). Along the way, Ravi must confront his own dark past and the secrets that he has been keeping from himself. Khooni Raat features a mix of horror, mystery, and suspense, keeping the audience engaged until the very end. The movie features a range of jump scares, creepy atmospheric settings, and a strong narrative that keeps the viewer guessing until the final reveal. The movie also features a range of themes, including the supernatural, love, and the consequences of one's actions. The movie's climax is a masterclass in building tension and suspense, as Ravi confronts the evil spirit and uncovers the truth behind the Bloody Night. Overall, Khooni Raat is a classic Indian horror movie that will keep you on the edge of your seat. With its creepy atmosphere, jump scares, and strong narrative, it's a must-watch for fans of the horror genre.

== Soundtrack ==
#	Song title	Singer(s)
1	"Maine Bhi Chuski Lee"	Hemlata
2	"Sawan Sawan Dekho Aa Gaya"	Usha Khanna, Mohammed Aziz
3	"Tere Bina Main Kuchh Bhi Nahi"	Usha Khanna, Vinod Rathod
