= Dosti Dushmani =

- Theatrical release poster
- Directed by: T. Rama Rao
- Written by: Dr. Rahi Masoom Reza (dialogues)
- Screenplay by: M. D. Sunder
- Story by: Balamurugan
- Based on: Chakravarthy by Mahendran
- Produced by: T. Rama Rao
- Starring: Jeetendra; Rajinikanth; Rishi Kapoor; Kimi Katkar; Poonam Dhillon; Bhanupriya
- Cinematography: S. Navkanth
- Edited by: J. Krishna Swamy; T.V. Balu
- Music by: Laxmikant–Pyarelal
- Production company: Srinath Productions
- Release date: 31 October 1986
- Running time: 152 minutes
- Country: India
- Language: Hindi

Dosti Dushmani (transl. Friendship and Enmity) is a 1986 Indian Hindi-language action drama film, produced and directed by T. Rama Rao under the Srinath Productions banner. It stars Jeetendra, Rajinikanth, Rishi Kapoor, Poonam Dhillon, Kimi Katkar and Bhanupriya, with music composed by Laxmikant–Pyarelal. The film was a remake of 1977 Tamil film Chakravarthy which was also remade later in Telugu as Mugguru Mithrulu (1985) and later in Kannada as Brahma Vishnu Maheshwara (1988). It marked Bhanupriya's Bollywood film debut.

== Plot ==
The film begins with three soulmates, Sandeep, Ranjit, & Prakash. Daaga, Ranjit's father, is a deadly gangster. In a swap, Ranjit hands him over to the Police. However, he absconds with his wife & daughter Rekha, evading Ranjit, whom Sandeep's parents foster. Years roll by, and the three mates grow along with their bondage. Sandeep becomes a renowned Doctor, Ranjit is a fearless cop, and Prakash is a leading criminal lawyer. The three always have uphill battles with Daaga, who must achieve the apex in crime and is unbeknownst to Ranjit. Besides, Ranjit & Prakash perturb with hotheaded Sandeep against injustice.

Meanwhile, annoyed, Daaga hurls his henchman, who molests Ranjit’s pregnant wife, Lata. Here, enraged, Sandeep wallops the blackguard and takes a word from Lata to be quiet. Exploiting it, Daaga slays his sidekick and incriminates Sandeep. Thus, a rift arises as duty-bound Ranjit apprehends Sandeep, and Prakash defends him. Since Sandeep is compelled, Prakash forges a woman, Rekha, as Sandeep’s wife and acquits him. However, Ranjit does not give up and ceaselessly seeks to unearth the fact, but in vain. Next, Sandeep truly knits Rekha. Prakash falls for a pickpocket, Shanti, a victim of Daaga. Ongoing the situation gets more complex, Lata reveals the truth to Ranjit. Nevertheless, he wholeheartedly accepts her. At last, the three fuse and cease Daaga when Ranjit & Rekha realize they are siblings and Daaga is their father. Finally, the movie ends on a happy note, with the three proceeding with their friendship.

== Cast ==
- Jeetendra as Dr.Sandeep Kumar
- Rajinikanth as Inspector Ranjit
- Rishi Kapoor as Advocate Prakash
- Poonam Dhillon as Lata
- Kimi Katkar as Shanti
- Bhanupriya as Rekha
- Amrish Puri as Daaga
- Pran as Devendra Pratap Singh
- Shavukar Janaki as Sumitra Singh
- Kader Khan as Nishaan
- Shakti Kapoor as Kamal
- Shafi Inamdar as Police Commissioner Vinod
- Asrani as Lawyer Khairatlal
- Guru Bachan as Rowdy
- Ceylon Manohar

== Soundtrack ==
Lyrics: Anand Bakshi

Sr.No.	Title	Singer(s)
1	Jhatke Pe Jhatke	Mohammed Aziz, Kavita Krishnamurthy
2	Saath Baras Ka Dulha	Shailender Singh, Mohammed Aziz, Kavita Krishnamurthy
3	Ithlaye Kamar Band Kamre Mein	S. P. Balasubrahmanyam, S. Janaki
4	Munne Ki Amma	Mohammed Aziz, Kavita Krishnamurthy
5	Yaaro Hum Ko Dekh	Suresh Wadkar, Mohammed Aziz, Shailender Singh
