= Humlaa =

- Directed by: N. Chandra
- Written by: N. Chandra
- Produced by: Madan Mohla
- Starring: Dharmendra; Anil Kapoor; Meenakshi Sheshadri; Kimi Katkar
- Music by: Laxmikant–Pyarelal
- Production company: Seven Arts Pictures
- Release date: 29 May 1992
- Country: India
- Language: Hindi

Humlaa is a 1992 Indian Hindi-language action film directed by N. Chandra, starring Dharmendra, Anil Kapoor, Meenakshi Sheshadri and Kimi Katkar, supported by Ashok Kumar, Anupam Kher and Shafi Inamdar.

== Cast ==
- Dharmendra as Bhawani Saxena
- Anil Kapoor as Shiv Saxena
- Meenakshi Sheshadri as Seema Saxena
- Kimi Katkar as Queen Anita
- Anita Raj as Sadhana Thakur
- Usha Bachani as Kamya
- Ashok Kumar as Devkishan Sharma
- Anupam Kher as Jagtap
- Sulabha Deshpande as Seema's mother
- Shafi Inamdar
- Dev Kishan as post master
- Sudhir as Bhawani's man
- Mac Mohan

== Soundtrack ==
| Song | Singer |
|---|---|
| "Pani Khoon Nahin Banta, Khoon Nahin Banta Pani" | Mohammed Aziz |
| "Pani Khoon Nahin Banta, Khoon Nahin Banta Pani" | Mohammed Aziz; Nitin Mukesh |
| "Shuru Shuru Ki Yeh Mulaqaten" | Mohammed Aziz; Anuradha Paudwal |
| "Ab Tum Aaye Ho To" | Anuradha Paudwal |
| "Dil Nahin Dena Re, Dil Nahin Lena" | Amit Kumar; Alka Yagnik |
| "Tu Bada Aadmi Hai" | Alka Yagnik |
| "Sau Sawaalon Ka Jawab" | Udit Narayan |
