= Roti Ki Keemat =

Roti Kee Keemat
- Promotional poster
- Directed by: Ramesh Ahuja
- Written by: Anwar Khan; Raj Tilak
- Produced by: Suresh Grover
- Starring: Mithun Chakraborty; Kimi Katkar
- Cinematography: Anil Mitra
- Music by: Bappi Lahiri
- Production company: Rohitasha movies
- Release date: 26 October 1990
- Running time: 130 minutes
- Country: India
- Language: Hindi
- Budget: ₹18 million (US$190,000)

Roti Kee Keemat is a 1990 Indian Hindi-language action film directed by Ramesh Ahuja, starring Mithun Chakraborty, and Kimi Katkar in the lead roles.

== Plot ==
Shankar is a village boy who loves Bijli. His mission is to help the needy. He established a shelter for orphans, but Jagavar Chaudhry, the local goon, tries to disrupt Shankar's mission.

== Cast ==
- Mithun Chakraborty as Shankar
- Kimi Katkar as Bijli
- Pran as Inspector / Police Commissioner R.K. Mathur
- Sadashiv Amrapurkar as Jagavar / J.K.
- Gulshan Grover as Inspector Dabholkar
- Puneet Issar as D’Souza
- Bob Christo as Bob
- Rana Jung Bahadur as Rocky
- Dinesh Hingoo as Politician
- Jagdish Raj as Chief Commissioner of Police
- Viju Khote as Viju
- Anjana Mumtaz as Sharda Mathur
- Manik Irani as Goon
- Raj Tilak as Sangha

== Soundtrack ==
Lyrics: Indeevar

Song	Singer
"Aankhon Se Pee Le"	Usha Uthup
"Hamari Chutiya Ka"	Amit Kumar
"Hathon Mein Chudi"	Asha Bhosle
"Jangal Mein Ek Sher"	Sudesh Bhosle
"Le Le Babu Nariyal Pani"	Kavita Krishnamurthy
