= Beena Banerjee =

Indian film and television actress

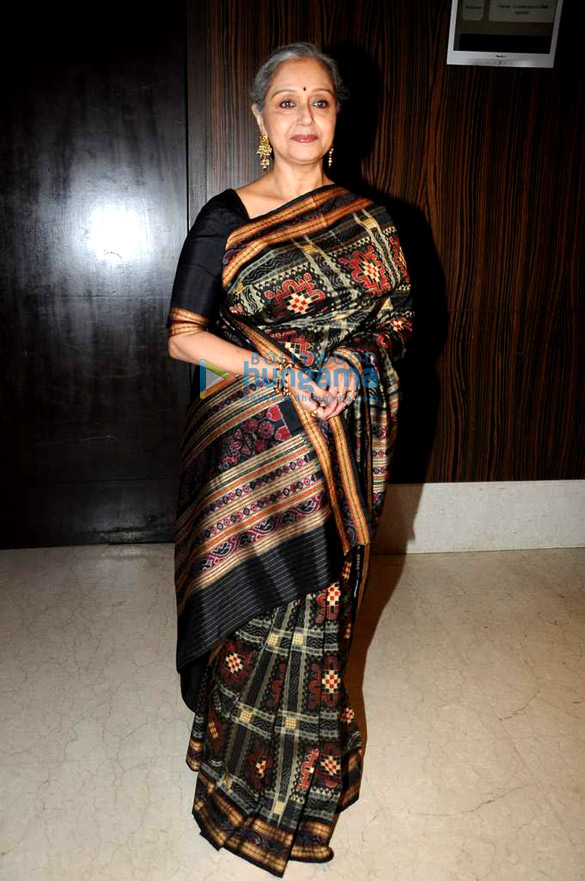
- Banerjee in 2009
- Born: Beena Batabyal; 19 February 1953 (age 73); Calcutta, Bengal Presidency, British India
- Other names: Bina, Beena
- Occupation: Actress
- Height: 5 ft 3 in (1.60 m)
- Spouse: Ajay Biswas (separated)
- Parent: Pradeep Kumar (father)
- Relatives: Deviprasad Batabyal (brother); Meena Batabyal (sister); Reena Batabyal (sister)

Beena Banerjee, also known as Beena or Bina, is an Indian actress in Bengali and Hindi films and television.

== Early and personal life ==
Beena Banerjee was born as Beena Batabyal, the daughter of film actor Pradeep Kumar (1925–2001). She married Ajay Biswas, an actor and film director, but they separated. She has a son, Siddharth Banerjee, who has worked as assistant director to Sajid Khan in two films, namely Housefull 2 (2012) and Himmatwala (2013).

== Filmography ==
Year	Film	Role	Notes
1977	Doosara Aadmi		
1978	Satyam Shivam Sundaram: Love Sublime		
1979	Shikshaa	Janki	
1980	Labbaik		
1980	Dilwale Dulhaniya Le Jayenge		
1981	Love Story		credited as Beena
1981	Jail Yatra		
1981	Thrishna		
1982	Ayaash	Aruna	
1982	Swami Dada		
1983	Rachna		
1983	Film Hi Film		
1983	Lovers	Viju's mom	
1984	Jaag Utha Insan	Gopi's wife	
1984	Pyasa Shaitan		
1984	Andar Baahar	Mrs Beena Sahani	
1984	Jagir	Monica D'Souza	
1984	Awaaz	Mrs. Amit Gupta	
1985	Haqeeqat	Sharda	
1985	Meri Jung	Dr. Asha Mathur	
1985	Ek Daku Saher Mein	Mrs. Radha Singh	
1985	Aakhir Kyon?	Abha	
1985	Jaanoo	Dr. Prabha	
1986	Long Da Lishkara	Kaur	
1986	Jeeva		
1986	Durgaa Maa	Annapurna	
1986	Sasti Dulhan Mahenga Dulha		
1986	Karma	Sunil's wife	
1986	Anokha Rishta		
1986	Asli Naqli	Birju's mother	uncredited
1987	Zevar	Kamla	
1987	Parivaar	Childless Mother	
1987	Apne Apne	Tara	
1987	Kudrat Ka Kanoon	Charandas' wife	credited as Beena
1987	Mera Yaar Mera Dushman	Wheel Chair Ridden Wife	
1988	Shoorveer	Shanti Malhotra	
1988	Mere Baad	Meena	
1988	Yateem	Mrs. Ujagar Singh	uncredited
1988	Ghar Mein Ram Gali Mein Shyam	Mrs. Srivastav	
1988	Qayamat Se Qayamat Tak	Saroj	
1988	Tamacha	Mohan's Wife	
1988	Shukriyaa	Uma	
1988	Mahaveera	Devi	
1988	Zakhmi Aurat	Mrs. Mahendra Nath	
1988	Surer Akashe		
1989	Teri Payal Mere Geet	Leela's mom	
1989	Saaya	Beena	
1989	Meri Zabaan	Doctor in mental hospital	
1989	Hum Intezaar Karenge	Jyoti	
1989	Rakhwala	Ranjeet's Wife	
1989	Souten Ki Beti	Rama	
1989	Khoj	Mrs. Gulabo Singh	
1989	Chandni	Pooja	
1989	Bhrashtachar	Deepali Das	uncredited
1990	Yaadon Ka Mausam		
1990	Tejaa	Shanti	
1990	Jeene Do	Krishna	
1990	Deewana Mujh Sa Nahin	Mrs. Sharma	
1990	Lekin...	Sharda Ahmed Siddiqui	
1990	Naaka Bandi	Shanti M. Singh	
1990	Bandh Darwaza	Thakurain Lajjo P. Singh	
1990	Thanedaar	Laxmi	
1990	Baaghi: A Rebel for Love	Mrs. Vandana Sood	
1990	Shiva	Shiva's sister-in-law	
1991	Pratigyabadh	Laxmi Baburam Yadav	
1991	Phool Bane Angaarey		
1991	Khooni Raat		
1991	First Love Letter	Mrs. Ajit Singh	
1991	Deewane		
1991	The Magnificent Guardian		
1991	Saugandh	Shanti - Sarang's wife	
1991	Farishtay	Mother of slain child	
1991	Paap Ki Aandhi	Kamla 'Kammo'	
1991	Afsana Pyar Ka	Beena, Raj's Mother	
1992	Zulm Ki Hukumat		
1992	Mehboob Mere Mehboob	Mrs. Choudhry	
1992	Isi Ka Naam Zindagi	Kamla (Devraj's wife)	
1992	Do Hanso Ka Joda		
1992	Ghar Jamai	Surekha	
1992	Vansh	Tulsi K. Dharmadhikari	
1992	Sarphira		
1992	Zindagi Ek Juaa	Mrs. Shri Krishan Bhatnagar	uncredited
1992	Khiladi	Mrs. Indermukhi Malhotra	
1992	Mashooq	Mrs. Suman Kumar	
1993	Dil Aashna Hai	Shobha	
1993	Sahibaan	Mrs. Tikka	
1993	Pyar Pyar	Dhansukh's sister	
1993	Pehchaan	Urmilla Verma	
1993	Kundan	Parvati	
1993	Jaagruti	Jyoti	
1993	Shaktiman	Lakshmi	
1993	Khuda Gawah	Laxmi Sethi	
1994	Boy Friend	Radha	
1994	Insaaf Apne Lahoo Se	Mrs. Roopa Saxena	
1994	Chhoti Bahoo		
1994	Raja Babu	Mrs. Shanti Chandra Mohan	uncredited
1994	Sangdil Sanam	Mrs. Sharda Khurana	
1994	Baali Umar Ko Salaam	Mrs. Ansimal	
1994	Salaami	Mrs. Kapoor	
1994	Anjaam	Mrs. Padma Agnihotri	
1994	Saajan Ka Ghar	Gita Dhanraj	
1994	Dilbar	Mrs. Amrit Goswami	
1994	Main Khiladi Tu Anari	Mrs. Arjun Joglekar	
1994	Ikke Pe Ikka	Zarina	
1995	Teesra Kaun?	Manjula Priyanka's mother	
1995	Jeena Nahin Bin Tere		
1995	Bewafa Sanam	Mrs. Yashoda Prasad Shukla	
1995	Andaz		
1995	Aashique Mastane	Mrs. Hari Prasad	
1995	Prem	Sumitra	
1995	Criminal	Mrs. Verma	
1995	Zamaana Deewana	Sarita Malhotra	
1995	Gundaraj		
1997	Naseeb	Mrs. Din Dayal	
1997	Mohabbat		
1997	Kaun Rokega Mujhe		
1997	Agnichakra	Beena	
1997	Ziddi	Gayatri	
1997	Lav Kush	Shantaji	
1997	Aur Pyaar Ho Gaya	Gayetri Oberoi	
1998	Lakha		
1998	Mere Do Anmol Ratan	Bhagawat's sister	
1998	Humse Badhkar Kaun: The Entertainer	Chief Minister Gayetri Purohit	
1998	Prem Aggan	Mrs. Sheena Kumar	
1998-2000	Hip Hip Hurray	School Principal	
1999	Dulhan Banoo Main Teri	Kaushalya 'Kaushi' K. Rai	
1999	Jai Hind	Sheetal's Mother	
2000	Le Chal Apne Sang	Raj's Mother	
2000	Kushi	Geetha	Tamil film
2002	Khauff	Madam Prosecutor	
2002	Kitne Door Kitne Paas	Rama	
2002	Akhiyon Se Goli Maare	Mrs. Oberoi	
2002	Maseeha	Janki	
2003	Khushi	Madhu Roy	
2003	Andaaz	Mrs. Beena Sahay	
2003	Koi... Mil Gaya	Nisha's mom Indu	
2004	Shola: Fire of Love	Ajay's mom	
2004	Ishq Hai Tumse	Laxmi	
2004	Surya		
2004	Rakht	Dhristi's Mother	
2005	Ho Jaata Hai Pyaar	Kamla	
2005	Insan	Amjad's mother	
2005	Viruddh... Family Comes First	Swati Chitnis	
2005	Barsaat : A Sublime Love Story	Arav's Mother	
2006	Humko Tumse Pyaar Hai	Raj's Mother	
2006	Aatma	Suman	
2006	Alag: He Is Different ... He Is Alone ...	Gayatri P. Rana	
2006	Baabul	Balwant's wife	
2010	Khuda Kasam	Shanti	
2018	Karwaan	Tahira's mother	
2022	Radhe Shyam	Grandma	Telugu-Hindi bilingual film
2024	Ruslaan		
2025	Aap Jaisa Koi	Madhu's Grandmother	

=== Television ===
Year	Show	Role
2001–2002	Ramayan	Kaushalya
2009–2013	Uttaran	Gunwanti Umed Singh Bundela
2012	Savdhaan India	Mala Aunty (Episode 2084)
2015	Tere Sheher Mein	Pushpa Chaubey
2015	Tashan-e-Ishq	Preeto
2017–2018	Dil Sambhal Jaa Zara	Reema Mathur
2023	The Trial	Seema Sengupta
2023–2024	Pashminna – Dhaage Mohabbat Ke	Mrs. Kaul
2025	Parineetii	Sushma Kashyap
2025–2026	Naagin 7	Uttara
2026–present	Tu Hi Re Dil Mein	Kesar Patel
