= M. H. Saboo Siddik College of Engineering =

Engineering college in India

M.H.Saboo Siddik College of Engineering
- Motto: Saboo Siddik
- Type: Education and Research Institution
- Established: 22 April 1936
- Affiliations: University of Mumbai, NAAC, AICTE – UGC
- Principal: Dr. Mohiuddin Ahmed
- Location: Mumbai, Maharashtra, India
- Campus: Urban

M. H. Saboo Siddik (commonly known as MHSSE or Saboo Siddik or Saboo) is an engineering college located in Byculla at Saboo Siddik Polytechnic Road, Mumbai, India, affiliated with the University of Mumbai. It is an 'A' Grade institution, and is accredited by AICTE. The college 154 staff (57-teaching, 97-non-teaching) and a student body of about 1200.

== History ==
The Mohammed Haji Saboo Siddik Institute (A Muslim Minority Institution) owes its existence to the munificence of late Mohammed, son of Haji Saboo Siddik, who bequeathed a large sum of money for establishing, conducting and managing this Institution for imparting Vocational, Technical and Industrial training and education. The value of the assets, so bequeathed, exceeded Rupees Three Crore at the time of donation.

== Management and infrastructure ==
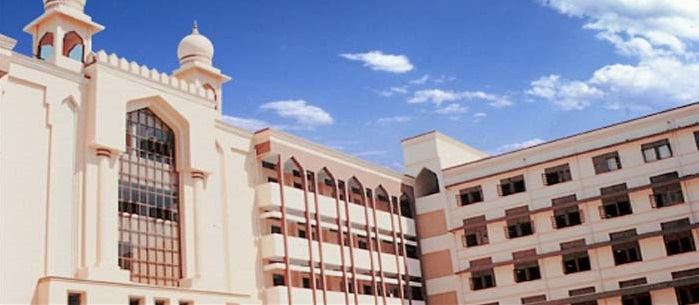

The Institution is managed and administered by the Anjuman-i-Islam as the sole trustee, appointed by the Bombay High Court's decree and scheme framed and sanctioned thereunder.

The college building accommodates workshops, laboratories, classrooms, lecture halls, drawing halls, student's common room, seminar hall, library, reading-rooms, offices. The library of the college is housed in a separate building and it has reference sections and reading-rooms for students and staff. A Seminar Hall was inaugurated by Zafar Saifullah IAS, Cabinet Secretary of India & Dr. Raja Ramanna, Minister of State for Defence and an eminent scientist of India, on the annual day celebrations on 9 April 2001.

== Notable alumni and faculty ==
- Kader Khan was a faculty of civil engineering between 1970 and 1975
