= Nitin Mukesh =

Indian singer (born 1950)

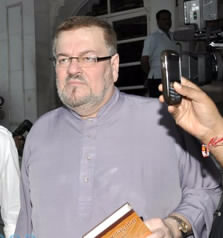
- Nitin Mukesh in March 2013

Background information
- Born: Nitin Mukesh Mathur; 27 June 1950 (age 76)
- Genres: Playback Singing
- Occupations: Singer
- Instruments: Vocalist
- Years active: 1970–present
- Spouse: Nishi Mukesh Mathur

Nitin Mukesh Mathur (born 27 June 1950) is an Indian playback singer known for his work as a playback singer in Hindi films as well as Bhajans. He has toured internationally, including to the United States in 1993, and a world tour in 2006 with his show Kal Ki Yaadein as a tribute to his father Mukesh.

Nitin Mukesh worked with notable music directors like Khayyam, R. D. Burman, Laxmikant-Pyarelal, Bappi Lahiri, Rajesh Roshan, Nadeem-Shravan, Anand–Milind during the 1980s and 1990s. He voiced for actors like Manoj Kumar, Shashi Kapoor, Jeetendra, Anil Kapoor, Jackie Shroff and others.

== Personal life ==
Nitin Mukesh's father is Mukesh, who was a Mathur Kayastha from Delhi, while his mother, Saral Trivedi, is a Gujarati Shrimali Brahmin.

He is married to Nishi Mukesh. Their son, Neil Nitin Mukesh is an actor.

== Songs by film ==
- "Hanste Hanste Kat Jayen Raste" (Khoon Bhari Maang)
- "Woh Kehte Hain Hum Se" (Dariya Dil)
- "My Name Is Lakhan" (Ram Lakhan)
- "Dil Ne Dil Se Kaha" (Aaina)
- "Is Jahaan Ki Nahin" (King Uncle)
- "Chandi Ki Cycle" (Bhabhi)
- "Paisa Bolta Hai" (Kala Bazaar)
- "Krishna Krishna" (Kishen Kanhaiya)
- "Tu Mujhe Suna" (Chandni)
- "Jaisi Karni Waisi" (Jaisi Karni Waisi Bharni)
- "So Gaya Yeh Jahan" (Tezaab)
- "Kasam Kya Hoti Hai" (Kasam)
- "Tune Mohe Taka" (Sone Pe Suhaaga)
- "Chal Gori Pyar Ke Gaon Mein" (Mulzim)
- "Zindagi Har Kadam" (Meri Jung)
- "Zindagi Ki Na Toote Ladi" (Kranti)
- "Aaja Re O Mere Dilbar" (Noorie)
- "Wafa Na Raas Aayee" (Bewafa Sanam)
- "Duma Dum Mast Kalandar" (Naakabandi)
- "Mere Khayal Se Tum" (Balmaa)
- "Zindagi Ka Naam Dosti" (Khudgarz) (1987)
- "Hey Re Dayamay Apni" (Ghar Ghar Ki Kahani) (1970)
- "Batao Tumhe Pyar Kaise" (Santosh (1989 film)) (1989)
- "Teri Jheel Si Gehri Aankhon" (Dhuen Ki Lakeer) (1974)

== Work with other singers ==
Nitin Mukesh started his career in the late 1970s and has sung hit duets with notable singers like Lata Mangeshkar, Asha Bhosle, Anuradha Paudwal, Kavita Krishnamurthy, Sadhana Sargam and Alka Yagnik. Some of the songs are:

Song	Movie	Co-singers
"Hey Re Daya Main"	Ghar Ghar Ki Kahani (1970)	Mukesh, Asha Bhosle
"Kranti Title Song"	Kranti (1981)	Manna Dey, Mahendra Kapoor, Lata Mangeshkar, Shailendra Singh
"Chana Joor Garam"	Kranti (1981)	Kishore Kumar, Mohammed Rafi, Lata Mangeshkar
"Zindagi Ki Na Toote"	Kranti (1981)	Lata Mangeshkar
"So Gaya Yeh Jahan"	Tezaab (1988)	Shabbir Kumar and Alka Yagnik
"My Name is Lakhan"	Ram Lakhan (1989)	Mohammad Aziz, Anuradha Paudwal
"Tu Mujhe Suna"	Chandni (1989)	Suresh Wadkar
"Mata Tere Dar Pe"	Hum Se Na Takrana (1990)	Shabbir Kumar, Shailender Singh and Kavita Krishnamurthy
"Hum Pyar Karte Hai"	Dilwale Kabhi Na Hare (1992)	Kumar Sanu, Alka Yagnik
"So Gaya Yeh Jahan"	Bypass Road (film) (2019)	Jubin Nautiyal

== Awards ==
- Lokmat Sur Jyotsna National Music Award - 2025 Icon Award for his contribution to Indian music.
