= Gair Kanooni =

1989 film

Gair Kaanooni
- Poster
- Directed by: Prayag Raj
- Written by: Prayag Raj; Kader Khan
- Produced by: Chetna M. Modi
- Starring: Govinda; Shashi Kapoor; Sridevi; Kimi Katkar
- Cinematography: Lawrence D'Souza
- Edited by: A. Paul Durai Singham
- Music by: Bappi Lahiri
- Release date: 24 March 1989
- Country: India
- Language: Hindi

Gair Kaanooni (transl. Illegal) is a 1989 Indian Hindi-language action film directed and written by Prayag Raj. The film stars Govinda and Sridevi. Kimi Katkar, Shashi Kapoor, Ranjeet, Kader Khan, and Rajinikanth are featured in supporting roles. The film was a hit at the box office. It was later dubbed in Tamil as Rakkamma Kaiyathattu.

== Plot ==
Officer Kapil Khanna was a strict enforcer of the law. In order to gain evidence against the local mafia don D'Costa he sought a favour from his underworld friend Azam Khan, a man with a golden heart. Azam Khan was successful in securing evidence against D'Costa but the mafia got wise to it and before Azam Khan could reach the law, D'Costa with the help of his friend Dalpat Dalal liquidated him. The blame of Azam Khan's death was owned by a petty driver Nathulal for a price paid by Dalpat Dalal. Azam Khan's little son Akbar swore vengeance against Police Officer Kapil Khanna as he felt him responsible. Kapil Khanna's wife delivered a baby boy in the hospital of D'Costa, so did Dalpat Dalaal's wife to a baby girl. D'Costa returned Dalpat's favour by interchanging the two on Dalpat's insistence. Kapil Khanna was enraged at this and he took to a legal battle against the hospital authorities.

== Cast ==
- Govinda as Om Narayan
- Sridevi as Laxmi
- Shashi Kapoor as Police Commissioner Kapil Khanna Special Appearance
- Kimi Katkar as Rita D'Costa
- Ranjeet as Robert D'Costa
- Kader Khan as Dalpat Dalaal
- Tej Sapru as Tony D'Costa
- Aruna Irani as Bantho
- Satyen Kappu as Nathulal
- Mukri as Chinnappa Malappa Shetty
- Viju Khote as Police Inspector Damodar
- Pinchoo Kapoor as Judge Dwarka Bhargav
- Rohini Hattangadi as Shanti , Kapil Khanna's wife
- Rajinikanth in a dual appearance as
  - Azam Khan
  - Akbar Khan

== Soundtrack ==
Lyrics: Indeevar

Song	Singer
"Sare Shahar Mein Ek Ladka, Sare Shahar Mein Ek Ladki"	Kishore Kumar, Asha Bhosle
"Jai Laxmi, Jai Laxmi, Jai Jai Bolo, Jai Laxmi"	Asha Bhosle, Bappi Lahiri
"Nakko Baba, Nakko Baba, Pyar Ka Yeh Rog"	Asha Bhosle, Bappi Lahiri
"Tik Tik Bole Dil Ki Ghadi, Pyar Karo Ghadi Ghadi"	Alisha Chinai, Bappi Lahiri
"Tum Jo Parda Rakhoge Hamara Abhi"	Aparna Mayekar, Bappi Lahiri
