= Mard Ki Zabaan =

- Directed by: K. Bapaiah
- Story by: Balamurugan
- Produced by: Anil Rathi
- Starring: Dharmendra; Jackie Shroff; Poonam Dhillon; Kimi Katkar
- Music by: Laxmikant–Pyarelal
- Production company: Shree Shankar Productions
- Release date: 14 August 1987
- Country: India
- Language: Hindi

Mard Ki Zabaan ("A Man's Word") is a 1987 Bollywood action film directed by K. Bapaiah, starring Dharmendra, Jackie Shroff, Poonam Dhillon and Kimi Katkar. The film was a remake of the Telugu film Yuga Purushudu.

== Plot ==
Ram Chauhan makes a living as a farmer and lives with his brother, Laxman. He falls in love with wealthy Laxmi Sahay, much to the chagrin of her father, Raghupati, who breaks off all relations with her. His anger does not subside even when Laxmi gives birth to a son, Vijay. When Raghupati announces that his sole beneficiary is going to be Shrinath, Laxman opposes this action, is assaulted, and eventually Ram ends up getting killed. Laxmi gets separated from Vijay, who ends up being adopted by another man, who renames him Rajesh. An angered Laxman goes to avenge his brother's death, kills some of Shrinath's goons, is arrested and sentenced to several years in prison. Years later, while still in prison, his friend, Govind, informs him that Raghupati has been conned by Shrinath and his son, Monty, and they have hired an impersonator, who has killed Raghupati and taken over the estate. Laxman escapes from prison and is hell-bent on destroying the impersonator, Shrinath and Monty at any and all costs - that is if the police and the impersonator let him.

== Cast ==
- Dharmendra as Laxman Chauhan
- Jackie Shroff as Vijay Chauhan / Rajesh
- Poonam Dhillon as Lata
- Kimi Katkar as Rosy
- Tanuja
- Raj Kiran as Anand
- Navin Nischol as Ram Chauhan
- Sushma Seth as Laxmi Sahay
- Shreeram Lagoo as Zamindar Raghupati Sahay
- Vikas Anand as Govind
- Asrani as Rahim / Inspector Totaram
- Prem Chopra as Shrinath
- Shakti Kapoor as Monty
- Deep Dhillon as Goon
- Manik Irani as Red Devil

== Soundtrack ==
Song	Singer
"Lo Aa Gaya Hero, Ji Bharke Dekhiye"	Kishore Kumar, S. Janaki
"Humne Jo Bhi Tumko Diye, Lauta Do Humko Woh Priye"	Kishore Kumar, Alka Yagnik
"Gagan Jhume, Kadam Chume"	Shabbir Kumar
"Samajh Samajhkar Samajh Ko Samjho"	Manhar Udhas, Alka Yagnik
"Hoti Jo Main Bijli"	Alka Yagnik
