= Zakhmi Aurat =

- Directed by: Avtar Bhogal
- Based on: The Ladies Club by Janet Greek
- Starring: Dimple Kapadia; Raj Babbar
- Music by: Bappi Lahiri
- Release date: 2 September 1988
- Country: India
- Language: Hindi

Zakhmi Aurat (English : Wounded Woman) is a 1988 Indian Hindi drama movie starring Dimple Kapadia and Raj Babbar and directed by Avtar Bhogal. Kapadia plays Kiran Dutt, a police officer who is subject to a gang rape and when the judicial system fails to convict the criminals, unites with other rape victims to castrate the rapists in revenge.

The film is inspired by the 1986 American thriller The Ladies Club by Janet Greek.

== Plot ==
The film is about women who have been raped and how they get revenge by castrating the rapists. Kiran Dutt is a woman police officer who is gang raped by three goons in gruesome fashion - her jeans and panty flung on the fan, her hands and legs spread wide apart and tied to bed posts, as testimony to the ghastly act taking place below. In the film the victim's trust in the Indian judicial system is shattered when despite her testimony, her rapists walk free. She decides to punish the rapists by forming a gang of wronged women and the modus operandi is to first identify the rapists, trap them and then castrate them one by one.

== Cast ==
- Dimple Kapadia as Inspector Kiran Dutt
- Raj Babbar as Suraj Prakash
- Anupam Kher as Advocate Mahendranath
- Rama Vij as Dr. Asha Mehta
- Aruna Irani as Salma
- Beena Banerjee as Mrs. Mahendranath
- Satyendra Kapoor as Shanti's Father
- Om Shivpuri as Police Commissioner
- Puneet Issar as Sukhdev (Rapist)
- Tej Sapru as Suryakant (Rapist)
- Shiva Rindani as Ranjit (Rapist)
- Avtar Gill as Pinky's Rapist
- Roopesh Kumar as Raj
- Mangal Dhillon as Mr. Mehta
- Leela Mishra as Shanti's Grandmother
- Kalpana Iyer as Kanta
- Chand Usmani as Suraj's Mother
- Moolchand as Moolchand
- Surbhi Javeri Vyas as Neelu, Castration Gang Member
- Madhu Malhotra as Castration Gang Member

== Soundtrack ==
All songs are written by Faruk Kaiser.

Song	Singer
"Tauba Tauba, Allah Tauba"	Asha Bhosle
"Pal Pal Jale Meri Aatma"	Asha Bhosle
"Pyar Mila, Sab Kuch Mila, Pyar Hai To Sansar Hai"	Anuradha Paudwal, Mohammed Aziz
"Apni Raksha Aap Karegi"	Mohammed Aziz
"Apni Raksha Aap Karegi"	Chandrani Mukherjee

== Production ==
Dialogues of this movie written by Iqbal Durrani became quite popular.

== Critical response ==
A financial success, the film opened to a polarised reaction from critics and further attracted wide coverage for its lengthy and brutal rape scene involving Kapadia. Khalid Mohammed of The Times of India noted Kapadia's "power packed performance" but criticised the rape sequence as "utter lasciviousness" and "vulgarity spattering through the screen". Feminist magazine Manushi panned its low cinematic quality, including the absurdity of the action scenes and the "ugly kind of titillation" in the rape scene, but believed it "stays closer to women's experience" than other films of its sort; the review was particularly approving of Kapadia's work: "What really carries the film through is Dimple Kapadia's performance—low key, moving and charming without being at all clinging or seductive. She brings a conviction to her role that is rare among Bombay heroines."

In later years, The Times of India labelled it a "B-grade movie" though it noted Kapadia's convincing portrayal of "anguish and bitterness at being denied justice". M.L. Dhawan from The Tribune, while documenting the famous Hindi films of 1988, praised Kapadia for "proving her mettle as an actress of intensity and passion." Subhash Jha, however, wrote in 2002 that its box-office outcome notwithstanding, Zakhmi Aurat "turned into quite an embarrassment for its leading lady".
