= Kala Bazaar =

- Vinyl Record Cover
- Directed by: Rakesh Roshan
- Written by: Ravi Kapoor; Mohan Kaul; Kader Khan (dialogue)
- Produced by: Vijay Soorma
- Starring: Anil Kapoor; Jackie Shroff; Farha Naaz; Kimi Katkar
- Cinematography: Pushpal Dutta
- Edited by: Sanjay Verma
- Music by: Rajesh Roshan
- Production company: Vidyashree Pictures
- Distributed by: Vidyashree Pictures
- Release date: 6 October 1989
- Country: India
- Language: Hindi

Kala Bazaar (transl. The Black Market) is a 1989 Indian Hindi-language action film directed by Rakesh Roshan. It stars Kader Khan, Anil Kapoor and Jackie Shroff. This film deals with the socio-political issues of corruption, primarily in the form of bribery in government offices in the Indian society of the 1980s. The film was a remake of Tamil film Panam Paththum Seiyum and was also remade in Kannada as Lancha Lancha Lancha. The film did not do well at the box office.

== Plot ==
The film opens at the municipal building and construction department office (Mumbai, India). The superintendent of the office, Thakur, gets a telephone call from the industrialist Ranbir Gupta. Ranbir asks if his construction permits have been approved. Thakur is flustered, but informs him that a newly appointed clerk in his office is holding up the file.

The film introduces the new clerk, Kimtilal Saxena (Kadar Khan). When an ordinary guy approaches him with plans to extend the perimeter of his home (and, in accordance with prevalent practice, offers him a bribe), Kimtilal flatly refuses. The guy insists, so Kimtilal asks him to send up a cup of tea (with 2 spoonfuls of sugar) from the small shop opposite the office. The guy approaches the tea stall run by the eccentric tea vendor Kutti (Johny Lever), only to discover that each spoonful of sugar is 200 rupees (the bribe for Kimtilal). The guy is surprised, but Kutti explains that one must change with the times. The guy pays Kutti and duly gets his permits. Kimtilal settles accounts with Kutti every evening, and that Kutti receives a small cut. The money trail touches everyone at the office.

One evening, a couple of thugs grab Kimtilal and bring him before three other guys: Ranbir Gupta, a real estate developer; Sampath Seth, a licence officer; and Jagan Dhamaliya, a fearsome thug. Ranbir and Sampath require various permits and licences (that routinely require approvals from Kimtilal's office), and Jagan provides muscle to ensure there are no interruptions. They offer Kimtilal a fat bribe and enter an arrangement with him to pay him off regularly for all their needs. Kimtilal is only too glad to accept this offer.

The young Kimtilal thus moves along. On the personal front, he makes a happy home with his wife and son Kamal. Kimtilal is good friends with fellow clerk Girdharilal, and their sons Kamal and Vijay become friends as well. We discover that Kamal fancies Kamini (but nobody is aware that Kamini is Sampath's daughter), and Vijay has a girlfriend in a bar owner, Sona.

Things take a turn when a cop from the anti-corruption squad arrives to investigate suspicious activities between the government office and the offices of Gupta and Sampath. This officer is killed (by Jagan). Kimtilal's manager, Thakur, is also concerned that Gupta and Sampath are beginning to seek aggressive permits (for buildings that grossly exceed known structural limits). Kimtilal assures Thakur that they need not burden themselves about this because they are merely the intermediate rungs of a ladder that extends much higher and involves many other, more powerful, people. Thakur is not wholly convinced, but signs off on Gupta's new enterprise, Nirmal building, in spite of the structural faults.

Around this time, Kamini asks her father's permission to marry Kamal. Sampath is enraged (with the thought that Kamal somehow seduced or deceived his daughter to marry so far below her own station). Sampath storms into Kimtilal's home and angrily rebukes Kimtilal. Kimtilal is neither a fool nor a sycophant. He points out that it was Kamini (herself a headstrong girl) who brought forth the proposal; that he (Kimtilal) was not aware of it; and that if the children have decided upon each other, then the parents had best give it their blessing. Sampath, however, stands fast on his notion of status, insults Kimtilal and leaves. Kimtilal is now incensed. He stops the permits for Nirmal building. Sampath and Gupta confer. Gupta advises Sampath that the losses associated with Nirmal building are too great to ignore, and that Kamal is otherwise a likeable boy. Sampath grudgingly agrees. Kimtilal exacts an elaborate wedding and a separate apartment for Kamal as part of the arrangement.

Kamal discovers soon after that his application for the Indian Police Service has been approved. (Kimtilal is not surprised, he had arranged to pay off the admissions board.) Shortly thereafter, Kamal finds out that Vijay's application (in spite of the fact that Vijay has scored higher on the exams and physicals) has been denied. Vijay is deeply disappointed and arrives home in a drunken stupor. Kimtilal arrives to condole, but Girdharilal angrily drives him away. Girdharilal further threatens to expose Kimtilal, Thakur and anyone else. (We note that Girdharilal has remained clean over the years.)

Kimtilal, at the urging of Thakur and others, arranges to frame Girdharilal of taking a bribe. Unable to bear the shame of an arrest, Girdharilal commits suicide. He leaves a suicide note where he affirms his innocence and states that he was framed. Vijay resolves to find those who framed him.

This incident stirs trouble between Vijay and Kamal. For the first time in their lifelong friendship, Vijay asks why Kamal had such a different upbringing, culminating in admission to the police academy when Vijay clearly had better academic records. Vijay bluntly points out that Kimtilal has bathed in bribes all along. Kamal flatly denies this, but finally brings the question to his father. Vijay bands together with other like minded youth and starts a grassroots campaign to publicly identify and shame people who engage in bribery and corruption. This campaign is received very well, and its effects begin to show.

Kimtilal denies the allegations. But sometime later, Nirmal building collapses and all the residents are crushed to death. Thakur, the original signer of the permits, panics, and Jagan eventually silences him. Evidence (in the form of an inadvertent taped conversation between the tea boy Kutti and Kimtilal) reaches Kamal and Kamal now arrives home to arrest Kimtilal.

Kimtilal now comes clean. He delivers a dramatic denouement. The system is slow, overcrowded and unresponsive or unavailable to aam aadmi (common man). Kimtilal says that had he not bribed the doctor at the government hospital, his wife would have succumbed to pregnancy complications and Kamal would never have been born. Every step of Kamal's life, school, college, the police academy and his wedding, was paved with Kimtilal's paying off the relevant government and social authorities. Kamal indignantly says he never asked for this, and Kimtilal quietly points out that Kamal would not even have been born but for the bribe. Kamal angrily asks if the cost of hundreds of lives (at Nirmal building) justified the bribe. Kamal finally arrests Kimtilal. Kimtilal is prosecuted by the DA Kamini, but is able to cleverly negotiate around the evidence and exonerate himself.

Meanwhile, Vijay discovers that Kimtilal was the man who framed his father. Vijay arrives at the court house just as Kimtilal has been set free. Enraged, Vijay stabs Kimtilal. Kimtilal finally reveals the roots of the nexus (Sampath and Gupta), and succumbs to his injuries. The film ends with various improvements in society to eradicate bribery. Vijay is released from prison (with a limited term) and walks into the waiting arms of his family and friends.

== Cast ==
The film's cast is as follows:

- Anil Kapoor as Vijay
- Jackie Shroff as Inspector Kamal Saxena
- Farha Naaz as Kamini Sampat (Kamal's Lover)
- Kimi Katkar as Sona (Vijay's Lover)
- Kader Khan as Kimtilal Saxena (Kamal's Father)
- Raza Murad as Ranvir Gupta
- Kiran Kumar as Jagan Dhamaliya
- Shafi Inamdar as Sampat Seth
- Johnny Lever as Kutti
- Sujit Kumar as Girdharilal (Vijay's Father)
- Sudhir Pandey as Municipal Superintendent Thakur
- Viju Khote as Man at Municipal Office guest appearance
- Dinesh Hingoo as who always visit at municipal Office for Water Complaint
- Anjana Mumtaz as Vijay's mother
- Vikas Anand as Government official who visit Kader Khan for investigation
- Chandrashekhar as Police Commissioner (Cameo Role)
- Shashi Kiran as Kailash unemployed youth
- K. K. Raj as Unemployed youth
- Javed Hyder as 211 Boy at Kutti tea shop (Child Artist)

== Production ==
The film is one of several projects directed by Rakesh Roshan and starring Anil Kapoor.

== Soundtrack ==
The track list is as follows:

All lyrics are written by Indeevar and Payam Sayeedi; all music is composed by Rajesh Roshan.

No.	Title	Singer(s)	Length
1.	"Paisa Bolta Hai"	Nitin Mukesh
2.	"Jumma Jumma, Do Hi Mulaqaton Mein"	Nitin Mukesh, Sadhana Sargam
3.	"Kehdo Yeh Haseenon Se"	Asha Bhosle, Anwar, Kumar Sanu, Sadhana Sargam
4.	"Ek Tujh Mein Hi"	Kumar Sanu, Sarika Kapoor
5.	"Aala Re Aala Govinda Aala"	Amit Kumar, Shabbir Kumar, Sadhana Sargam

== Reception and legacy ==
According to the Hindustan Times, the film "had a show stealer in Kader Khan who played a government servant".
