= Jeeto Chappar Phaad Ke =

Indian television series

Jeeto Chappar Phaad Ke is an Indian game show which premiered on Sony TV on 26 January 2001, hosted by Govinda.

The title track of the show was sung by Shaan and composed by Lesle Lewis.

The show's opening was rated 18.1 and 17.2 across five cities.
