= Kimi Katkar =

Indian former actress and model (born 1965)

- Born: Mumbai, Maharashtra, India
- Occupations: Actress and Model
- Years active: 1984-1994
- Spouse: Shantanu Sheorey

Kimi Katkar is a former actress and model, who worked in Hindi films. She was active throughout the 1980s and the early 1990s, and starred in over 50 films, including Adventures of Tarzan (1985) and Hum (1991).

== Career ==
Kimi Katkar made her acting debut in the 1985 film Patthar Dil as a supporting actress. Later that year, she starred in Adventures of Tarzan, where she played the lead opposite Hemant Birje. After the film, she continued to work through the late 1980s in many popular and hit films such as Mera Lahoo (1987), Dariya Dil (1988), Sone Pe Suhaaga (1988), Gair Kanooni (1989), Jaisi Karni Waisi Bharnii (1989) and Khoon Ka Karz (1991). She acted in 35 movies during the three years 1988-90 and in 1989 alone had 15 releases. While she was mostly paired with Anil Kapoor, Govinda and Aditya Pancholi she has also played the lead opposite more senior stars of the era like Dharmendra, Amitabh Bachchan, Vinod Khanna, Jeetendra, Shatrughan Sinha and Rishi Kapoor.

In Hum (1991), she played the lead opposite Amitabh Bachchan. The popular song "Jumma Chumma De" from this movie was picturized on her and was sung by playback singers Sudesh Bhonsle and Kavita Krishnamurthy. Her last film was Humlaa (1992). During the same time, she refused film offers for Yash Chopra's Parampara (later Ramya Krishna did the role). Katkar quit the Hindi film industry after her marriage to photographer and ad-filmmaker Shantanu Sheorey in 1992 and is settled in Melbourne, Australia.

She is associated with the book Shantaram which was written by Gregory David Roberts. Roberts was an Australian fugitive who escaped to India where he worked as an extra in films including Paanch Paapi (1989) which starred Katkar.

== Personal life ==
Kimi is daughter of actress Meena Fernandez who starred in films like Sujatha, Bank Manager, Anari, Aar Paar, Amber and Milaap. Katkar married a commercial photographer and advertising film producer Shantanu Sheorey. She has one son, Siddhanth. She stays in Melbourne, Australia and has also been living in Aundh, a suburb in Pune, Maharashtra.

== Filmography ==
| Year | Film | Role | Cast opposite |
|---|---|---|---|
| 1985 | Patthar Dil | Rekha Singh | Jainendra |
| 1985 | Adventures of Tarzan | Ruby Shetty | Hemant Bije |
| 1986 | Dosti Dushmani | Shanti | Rishi Kapoor |
| 1987 | Mard Ki Zabaan | Rosie | Jackie Shroff |
| 1987 | Mera Lahoo | Pavitra D. Singh / Geeta | Govinda |
| 1988 | Zalzala | Reshma | Rajeev Kapoor |
| 1988 | Tohfa Mohabbat Ka | | Govinda |
| 1988 | Sone Pe Suhaaga | Usha | Anil Kapoor |
| 1988 | Shiv Shakti | | Govinda |
| 1988 | Mulzim | Dr. Rekha | Jeetendra |
| 1988 | Inteqam | Chhaya / Chandni | Anil Kapoor |
| 1988 | Dharamyudh | Suman | Adita Pancholi |
| 1988 | Dariya Dil | Radha | Govinda |
| 1988 | Tamacha | Dolly Saxena | Sumeet Saigal |
| 1988 | Rama O Rama | Hema D'Souza | Aasif Sheikh |
| 1989 | Ustaad | | Chunky Pandey |
| 1989 | Meri Zabaan | Kimi / Rita | Mithun |
| 1989 | Aaj Ke Shahenshah | | Jeetendra |
| 1989 | Kala Bazaar | Bar Owner | Anil Kapoor |
| 1989 | Ab Meri Baari | | Sumeet Saigal |
| 1989 | Vardi | Dr. Sonu Kaul | Sunny Deol |
| 1989 | Kahan Hai Kanoon | | Adita Pancholi |
| 1989 | Gair Kanooni | Rita | Govinda |
| 1989 | Jaisi Karni Waisi Bharnii | Radha | Govinda |
| 1989 | Abhimanyu | Geeta | Anil Kapoor |
| 1989 | Khoj | Mrs. Anita Kapoor | Rishi Kapoor |
| 1989 | Gola Barood | Reema | Shatrughan Sinha |
| 1989 | Aag Se Khelenge | Barkha 'Bijli' | Anil Kapoor |
| 1989 | Shehzaade | Bijli | Shatrughan Sinha |
| 1989 | Paanch Paapi | Arti | Hemant Bije |
| 1990 | Tejaa | Sonu | Sunjay Dutt |
| 1990 | Awaragardi | | Aditya Pancholi |
| 1990 | Zimmedaaar | Tina | Rajiv Kapoor |
| 1990 | Andher Gardi | | Raj Babbar |
| 1990 | Hum Se Na Takrana | | Shatrughan Sinha |
| 1990 | Kaaranama | | Vinod Khanna |
| 1990 | Roti Ki Keemat | Bijli | Mithun |
| 1990 | Sher Dil | | Rishi Kapoor |
| 1990 | Taqdeer Ka Tamasha | | Aditya Pancholi |
| 1991 | Jeevan Daata | Kiran Sharma | Chunkey Pandey |
| 1991 | Lahu Luhaan | Sonu/Alisha | Aasif Sheikh |
| 1991 | Khoon Ka Karz | | Rajnikanth |
| 1991 | Numbri Aadmi | Bijli | Mithun |
| 1991 | Hum | Jumma Gonzalves | Amitabh Bachchan |
| 1992 | Humlaa | Anita | Dharmendra |
| 1992 | Sarphira | Neetu | Sunjay Dutt |
| 1992 | Siyaasat | | Kumar Gaurav |
| 1992 | Zulm Ki Hukumat | Pratap's Girlfriend | Govinda |
