= Rama O Rama =

- Directed by: Mirza Brothers
- Written by: Mirza Brothers
- Produced by: Mirza Brothers
- Starring: Raj Babbar; Aasif Sheikh; Kimi Katkar
- Music by: R. D. Burman
- Release date: 9 December 1988
- Country: India
- Language: Hindi

Rama O Rama is a 1988 Indian Bollywood film directed and produced by Mirza Brothers. It stars Raj Babbar, Aasif Sheikh, Kimi Katkar in lead roles and music was composed by R. D. Burman.

== Plot ==
Monu and Sonu are brothers. They had extreme poverty. After their mother's death, their greedy and drunkard stepfather Sukhiya has sold Monu to a underworld don Anjani Rai, but Sonu managed to escape, then found and brought up by a Christian family. Years later, Monu becomes Sandeep Rai and takes over the underworld business. On the other side, his brother Sonu, who calls himself Ricky works as a drum player in a club. Vicky falls in love with Hema, who is the daughter of John D'Souza. Meanwhile Sandeep also falls in love with Hema, he forces Hema to marry him. At the day of marriage Sandeep dies saving his brother Ricky from Sukhiya and his friends Anjani Rai and Sahu Dada who try to kill Ricky.

== Cast ==
- Raj Babbar as Monu / Sandeep
- Aasif Sheikh as Sonu / Vicky
- Kimi Katkar as Hema
- Pran as John D'Souza
- Raza Murad as Anjani Rai
- Kiran Kumar as Sahu Dada
- Gulshan Grover as Sukhiya
- Shiva as Johny D'Souza

== Soundtrack ==
Song	Singer
"Rama O Rama"	Amit Kumar, Jayshree Shivram
"Barson Ke Baad Dekha"	Iqbal Siddiqui
"Tere Jaisa Pagal Premee Hoga Koi, Na Hoga Koi"	Asha Bhosle, Mohammed Aziz
"Ae Haseen Nazneen"	Mohammed Aziz
