= Mera Lahoo =

- Promotional poster
- Directed by: Veerendra
- Produced by: Ravindra Dhanoa, Bhargav Bhatt
- Starring: Govinda; Kimi Katkar; Gulshan Grover; Raj Kiran
- Music by: Anu Malik
- Release date: 13 March 1987
- Country: India
- Language: Hindi
- Budget: est. ₹2.07 crores
- Box office: ₹8.10 crores

Mera Lahoo (translation: My Blood) is a 1987 Indian film directed by Veerendra and starring Govinda and Kimi Katkar. The film was declared a hit.

== Summary ==
Elder brother Dharam (Raj Kiran) and younger brother Govinda (Govinda) live happily in a village. Dharam marries Pavitra (Kimi Katkar), while Govinda falls in love with Gita. Soon after the marriage, owing to evil intentions and manipulation, the two brothers are separated. Dharam's mind is poisoned by Dhaneshwar, who accuses Govinda of having had an illicit relationship with his bhabhi, Pavitra, forcing Govinda to leave the house. In Govinda's absence, Dharam is murdered, and bhabhi Pavitra becomes the victim of Dhaneshwar's lust. Enraged, Govinda returns to avenge his brother's death and Pavitra's rape. How and where Govinda takes his revenge forms the climax.

== Cast ==
- Govinda - Govinda Singh
- Kimi Katkar - Pavitra D. Singh / Geeta
- Gulshan Grover - Dhaneshwar "Dhanu"
- Utpal Dutt - Pratap Singh
- Raj Kiran - Dharam Singh
- Birbal - Raunaki
- Kirti Kumar - Rahim
- Sunil Dhawan - Senior Police Inspector

== Soundtrack ==
Mera Lahoo

Film score by Anu Malik
- Genre: Feature film soundtrack
- Length: 24:48
- Label: Venus

The music is composed by Anu Malik.

#	Title	Singer(s)	Lyricist(s)
1	"O Janeman"	Shailender Singh	Sameer
2	"Main Hoon Ek Bansuri"	Alka Yagnik	Kulwant Jani
3	"Govinda Tere Krishan Kanhaiya"	Mohammed Aziz	Kulwant Jani
4	"Ye Lo Kagaz Ye Lo Kalam"	Shabbir Kumar	Anwar Sagar
5	"Lahoo Ka Rang Ek Hai"	Shabbir Kumar	S. Malik
