= Naach Govinda Naach =

- Promotional Poster
- Directed by: S.Subhash
- Produced by: Jairam Gulabani
- Starring: Govinda; Mandakini; Raj Kiran
- Cinematography: Pramod Pathak
- Music by: Amar-Utpal
- Release date: 4 August 1992
- Country: India
- Language: Hindi

Naach Govinda Naach is a 1992 Bollywood dance film directed by S.Subhash, and starring Govinda, Mandakini and Raj Kiran.

== Cast ==
- Govinda
- Mandakini
- Raj Kiran as Anand
- Aruna Irani
- Johny Lever

== Soundtrack ==
The music of the film was composed by Amar–Utpal, while the lyrics were written by Anjaan.

No.	Title	Singer(s)	Length
1.	"Yeh Bachpan"	Kumar Sanu, Sangeet Haldipuri	5:06
2.	"Oh Nanha Nanha Haiya Haiya"	Amit Kumar, Jolly Mukherjee	1:55
3.	"Neeli Neeli Ankhon Mein"	Udit Narayan, Jayshri Shivram	5:43
4.	"Aala Govinda Aala"	Udit Narayan, Jayshree Shivram	9:06
5.	"Hum Jahan Jahan Gaye"	Jolly Mukherjee	3:37
