= Sone Pe Suhaaga =

- Theatrical release poster
- Directed by: K. Bapaiah
- Written by: Kader Khan (dialogues)
- Screenplay by: R. Selvaraj
- Story by: R. Selvaraj
- Produced by: Abdul Hafiz Nadiadwala
- Starring: Dharmendra; Jeetendra; Anil Kapoor; Poonam Dhillon; Sridevi; Kimi Katkar
- Cinematography: A.Venkat
- Edited by: Waman Bhonsle; Gurudutt Shirali
- Music by: Bappi Lahiri
- Production company: A. G. Films Pvt Ltd
- Release date: 26 August 1988
- Running time: 163 minutes
- Country: India
- Language: Hindi

Sone Pe Suhaaga (transl. Borax on Gold, met. Icing on the Cake or Cherry on Top) is a 1988 Indian Hindi-language action drama film, produced by Abdul Hafiz Nadiadwala on A. G. Films Pvt Ltd banner and directed by K. Bapaiah. The film features an ensemble cast of Nutan, Dharmendra, Jeetendra, Anil Kapoor, Poonam Dhillon, Sridevi, Kimi Katkar, Nirupa Roy, Kader Khan, Shakti Kapoor, Paresh Rawal, Anupam Kher and Navin Nischol.

Sone Pe Suhaaga released worldwide on 26 August 1988.

== Plot ==
Constable Vishwanath, an upright policeman in Mumbai, lives a simple life with his wife Usha, their elder son Vijay and infant twin boys. His honesty brings him into contact with Basheer Ahmed, a thief who, consumed by guilt, confesses his theft of ₹10 lakhs and surrenders the money to Vishwanath. This act of repentance is thwarted by a Sub-Inspector Teja, a corrupt and ambitious officer who sees an opportunity for gain. Teja murders Vishwanath in cold blood, frames Basheer for the crime and turns his attention to silent the family.

In the chaos that follows, Usha flees with her three children & Basheer. During the frantic escape one of the twins, who is in high fever, dies & the other sleeps & Usha couldn't differentiate them & by mistake yeets her alive child in the river, she soon realises her mistake but it's too late, she believes the child is dead after he slips into the river. Teja strikes again, separating Vijay from his mother. With her family torn apart, Usha is left only with one surviving infant son, never realizing that the other twin is alive.

Years pass. Teja rises through the underworld, amassing wealth and power while continuing his illegal activities, including a thriving kidney-trafficking racket. Vijay, having grown up on his own, becomes a principled industrialist determined to use the law to bring down criminals. His fight for justice puts him on a collision course with Teja when he takes up the case of Dr. Prem, his close friend. Prem had exposed Teja's organ racket and was shot dead on his wedding day by Jogindar, Teja’s ruthless son. Before dying, Prem names Jogindar as the killer, but Teja manipulates the courts through Justice Nyaychand Rastogi. Instead of convicting Jogindar, Teja has an orphan named Ravi falsely identified as the culprit. Unbeknownst to all, Ravi is actually Usha’s lost son (one of the twins, who was cremated by Usha by mistake).

Meanwhile, fate introduces several new players. Meena, a spirited pickpocket, repeatedly crosses paths with Vijay. What begins in irritation blossoms into romance, and through Meena, Vijay is unexpectedly reunited with his long-lost mother Usha. Teja alarmed at this development, frames Vijay for crimes he did not commit and sends him to prison.

Vikram, a street-smart ruffian, is recruited by Teja to eliminate Vijay. However, it is soon revealed that Vikram is in fact Ashwini Kumar, an undercover CBI officer tasked with dismantling Teja's empire. Ashwini becomes emotionally involved with Shraddha, Prem's widow and vows to avenge her husband's murder.

As the web tightens, Basheer is released from jail after years of wrongful imprisonment. He also attempts to expose Teja, but is silenced by the police. Nevertheless, he reconnects with Usha and through her, Ashwini and Vijay learn more about Teja's long history of crimes. While Ravi continues to live as an orphan, he finds love with Usha (the granddaughter of Vijay’s loyal associate Dinanath). In a dramatic turn, Usha recognizes Ravi as her missing son.

Teja, fearing exposure, kidnaps Basheer and Usha, blackmails Ravi into falsely confessing that he is Jogindar, leading to Ravi’s wrongful conviction and death sentence. At the same time, Jogindar kills Justice Rastogi, who on his deathbed reveals Teja's conspiracy in a final confession. Ravi is exonerated and the three young men — Vijay, Ravi, Ashwini unite to confront Teja and Jogindar.

The climax sees the trio overcoming Teja's forces in a battle of vengeance and justice. Teja and his son are finally defeated and peace is restored to the fractured family. The film concludes with a celebratory ending, as Vijay weds Meena, Ravi marries his beloved Usha, Ashwini finds happiness with Shraddha. This refers SONE PE SUHAAGA.

== Cast ==
- Nutan as Usha
- Dharmendra as CBI Officer Ashwini Kumar / Vikram Dada
- Jeetendra as Vijay
- Anil Kapoor as Ravi
- Poonam Dhillon as Advocate Shraddha
- Sridevi as Meena
- Kimi Katkar as Usha
- Satyendra Kapoor as Dinanath
- Bharat Bhushan as Kashinath
- Nirupa Roy as Mrs. Kashinath
- Kader Khan as Basheer Ahmed
- Shakti Kapoor as Jogindar
- Paresh Rawal as Teja
- Anupam Kher as Advocate / Justice Nyaychand Rastogi
- Navin Nischol as Constable Vishwanath
- Asrani as Conman
- Bharat Kapoor as Prakash
- Pinchoo Kapoor as Jailor
- Ajinkya Deo as Dr. Prem
- Tom Alter as Dr. Rex
- Mahesh Anand as Robert

== Soundtrack ==
Song	Singer
"Chori Chori"	Lata Mangeshkar, Kishore Kumar
"Seene Se"	Asha Bhosle, Kishore Kumar
"Dil Aafridam"	Asha Bhosle, Kishore Kumar
"Pyar Hamara"	Asha Bhosle, Nitin Mukesh
"Hat Jao"	Asha Bhosle
