= Jaisi Karni Waisi Bharnii =

Jaisi Karni Waisi Bharni
- Directed by: Vimal Kumar
- Written by: Kader Khan (dialogues); Shivam Chitrya; Gyandev Agnihotri
- Produced by: Vimal Kumar
- Starring: Govinda; Kimi Katkar; Asrani; Kader Khan; Shakti Kapoor
- Cinematography: Anil Dhanda
- Edited by: Prakash Dave
- Music by: Rajesh Roshan
- Production company: Shivam Chitrya
- Release date: 2 June 1989
- Country: India
- Language: Hindi

Jaisi Karni Waisi Bharnii (transl. What you sow, you shall reap) is a 1989 Indian family film directed and produced by Vimal Kumar. It stars Govinda, Kader Khan and Kimi Katkar in pivotal roles.

== Plot ==
Gangaram Verma (Kader Khan) is a man of ideals and a government servant. However, he is very honest and hates taking bribes. He lives in his ancestral house with his wife and son Vijay (Shakti Kapoor). Vijay is very ambitious and opposite to his father; he wants to get rich soon, for which he marries a wealthy girl Sapna (Shoma Anand) and becomes ghar jamai. Vijay's father-in-law, who is a builder wants to acquire Gangaaram's ancestral property. Vijay and Sapna manipulate Gangaaram and bring him to their own home. Gangaaram and his wife happily take care of their grandson Ravi (Neil Nitin Mukesh) and bring him up with good values. as Vijay builds a building on the property of his father, both Sapna and Vijay start showing their true colours. During that period, Ravi gets emotionally attached to his grandparents. As the story takes a leap, the young Ravi (Govinda) who sees his grandfather in a really bad state starts taking revenge from his parents just to make them realise their own mistake. Radha (Kimi Katkar), who is in love with Ravi also helps him in his drama of teaching a lesson to his parents. The story revolves around the concept of the proverb "What you sow, you shall reap".

== Cast ==
- Govinda as Ravi Verma
- Kimi Katkar as Radha
- Seema Deo as Laxmi Verma
- Asrani as Datturam
- Kader Khan as Gangaram Verma
- Shakti Kapoor as Vijay Verma
- Gulshan Grover as Ranjeet
- Neil Nitin Mukesh as Young Ravi Verma
- Shoma Anand as Sapna Verma
- Dinesh Hingoo as Jokumal Makhumal
- Rajesh Puri as Pyarelal
- Kunickaa Sadanand as Pyarelal's wife
- Yunus Parvez as Phoolchand
- Guddi Maruti as Bela Batliwala
- Paintal as Maganlal

== Soundtrack ==
#	Title	Singer(s)
1	"Aaya Aaya Yaar Ka Salam"	Mohammed Aziz & Sadhana Sargam
2	"Aaj Ke Bachche Bhi"	Shabbir Kumar, Rami Kumar & Jaishree Shriram
3	"Jaisi Karni Waisi Bharni (Sad Male)"	Nitin Mukesh
3	"Jaisi Karni Waisi Bharni (Sad Female)"	Sadhana Sargam
3	"Jaisi Karni Waisi Bharni (Female)"	Sadhana Sargam
3	"Jaisi Karni Waisi Bharni (Male)"	Nitin Mukesh
7	"Aaja A Khelen Game Koi"	Kumar Sanu & Sapna Mukherjee
8	"Mehke Huye Tere Lab Ke Ghulab"	Mohammed Aziz & Sadhana Sargam
