= Shiva-Shakti =

- Directed by: Anand
- Starring: Shatrughan Sinha; Anita Raj; Govinda; Kimi Katkar
- Music by: Anand–Milind
- Release date: 25 March 1988
- Country: India
- Language: Hindi

Shiva-Shakti is a 1988 Indian action drama film directed by Anand. It starred Shatrughan Sinha, Govinda, Anupam Kher, Kimi Katkar and Anita Raj.

== Plot ==
Shiva wants to collect money for his sister marriage and goes out of the town. He befriends with Shakti and Shakti falls in love with Shiva's sister Kusum. While she gets pregnant, Shiva vows to kill his friend.

== Cast ==
- Shatrughan Sinha as Shiva
- Govinda as Shakti
- Kimi Katkar as Kusum
- Anita Raj as Dolly
- Anupam Kher as D. C.
- Gulshan Grover as Jangha
- Shiva as Girja
- Goga Kapoor as Goga Thakur
- Leela Mishra as Rampyari
- Ashok Saraf as Karim
- Birbal as Gullu
- Dinesh Hingoo as Shiva's Boss
- Yunus Parvez as Biharilal
- Tiku Talsania as Inspector Waghmare

== Songs ==
Lyrics by Sameer.

1. "Peechha Na Chhodoongi" - Alka Yagnik & Shatrughan Sinha
2. "Teri Tarah To Mehfil Mein" - Alka Yagnik and Kishore Kumar
3. "Holi Main Dil Se Dil Mila Lo" - Alka Yagnik & Mohammed Aziz
4. "Mere Dil Ne Tujhe Chaha" - Kavita Krishnamurthy and Suresh Wadkar
5. "Mere Dil Ne Tujhe Chaha" (sad) - Kavita Krishnamurthy and Suresh Wadkar
