= Kader Khan =

Indian actor, comedian, screenwriter, and producer (1937–2018)

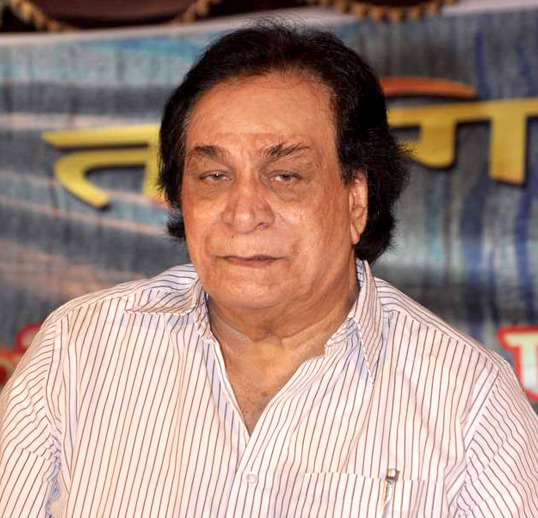
- Khan in 2013
- Pronunciation: [qɑːd̪əɾ xɑːn]
- Born: 22 October 1937; Kabul, Kingdom of Afghanistan
- Died: 31 December 2018 (aged 81); Mississauga, Ontario, Canada
- Education: Ismail Yusuf College
- Occupations: Film actor; screenwriter; comedian; film producer
- Years active: 1971–2018
- Works: Full list
- Spouse: Azra Khan
- Children: 3
- Honours: Padma Shri (2019; posthumously)

Kader Khan (Note: Hindustani pronunciation: [qɑːd̪əɾ xɑːn].) (Hindustani pronunciation: [qɑːd̪əɾ xɑːn]; 22 October 1937 – 31 December 2018) was an Indian actor, screenwriter and film producer. As an actor, he appeared in over 300 Bollywood films after his acting debut in the film Daag in 1973, starring Rajesh Khanna, as a prosecuting attorney. He was a prolific actor and screenwriter in Hindi cinema, from the late 1970s to 1990s and wrote dialogues for 200 films. Born in Afghanistan, Khan graduated from Ismail Yusuf College affiliated to Mumbai University. Before entering the film industry in 1971, he was a professor of civil engineering in M. H. Saboo Siddik College of Engineering, Mumbai.

== Early life and education ==
Kader Khan was born in Kabul, Afghanistan, on 22 October 1937 into a Sunni Muslim family. Khan was an ethnic Pashtun of the Kakar tribe. His father was Maulvi Abdul Rahman Khan from Kandahar, Afghanistan while his mother was Iqbal Begum from Pishin in the Baluchistan Province of British India (now in Balochistan, Pakistan). Khan's father was a scholar of Islam, a postgraduate in Arabic and Urdu, who opened an Islamic institute in the Netherlands to teach Islam to the local Dutch, and he often tasked Khan to translate books into Arabic. Khan had three brothers, Shams ur Rehman, Fazal Rehman and Habib ur Rehman. His cousin Akbar Khan Kakar hosted a popular show on Radio Pakistan's Quetta branch.

Khan was raised in the Kamathipura neighbourhood of Mumbai after his family moved there from Kabul. Khan had described the locality as being known for drug-peddlers, bootleggers and prostitution. He enrolled in a local municipal school and later in the Ismail Yusuf College after which he graduated in engineering, specialising in civil engineering. Between 1970 and 1975, he taught at M. H. Saboo Siddik College of Engineering in Byculla as a professor of civil engineering. Subjects he taught included applied mathematics and mechanics. As a teacher, he was known for making these subjects more accessible to the weaker students. Years later, at the peak of his film career, Khan would earn a master’s degree in Arabic literature from Osmania University, Hyderabad.

Mainly inspired by Russian literature and culture, with figures such as Stanislavsky, Chekhov and Dostoevsky, Khan used to write plays for colleges, also acting in them, while he was still a teacher. His one-act play, Jab Bhookh Kashmir Ko Bengal Bana Deti Hain, performed by Saboo Siddik College at IPTA inter-collegiate competition, created a quite a stir during those days. While performing in a play named Taash Ke Patey, he was noted by comedian Agha who then suggested actor Dilip Kumar to see the play. Dilip Kumar was impressed and signed him up for his next films, Sagina and Bairaag. During an interview with Rediff, Khan recalled this as the incident that started his film career. He used to write plays for theatres and was subsequently offered to write the script of Jawani Diwani, which started his career as a scriptwriter and for which Khan received 1500 rupees.

== Career ==
=== Actor ===
Khan acted in over 300 films in Hindi and Urdu and wrote dialogue for over 250 Indian films, from the 1970s up to the turn of the 21st century. At the insistence of Rajesh Khanna, Manmohan Desai paid him the high amount of one lakh twenty-one thousand (121,000) for writing dialogue for the film Roti (1974), which was produced by Khanna himself.

He was most popularly recognised for working with actors Amitabh Bachchan, Rajesh Khanna, Jeetendra, Feroz Khan, Mithun Chakraborty, Anil Kapoor, Govinda and in films directed by T. Rama Rao, K. Raghavendra Rao, K. Bapaiah, Narayana Rao Dasari, David Dhawan. He has worked side by side with other comedians like Asrani, Shakti Kapoor and Johnny Lever. He has co-starred with Amrish Puri, Prem Chopra, Amjad Khan and Anupam Kher in many films. He has played a large variety of parts in different genres of films like comedy, action, romance, family, social and political.

Khan made his debut with Daag, starring Rajesh Khanna in the main lead role, wherein Khan played the supporting role of an advocate. He subsequently starred as supporting artist with roles in Dil Diwana, Muqaddar Ka Sikandar and Mr. Natwarlal.

He also started getting roles as a supporting actor after 1984, with films like Masterji, Dharm Adhikari, Nasihat, Dosti Dushmani, Ghar Sansar, Loha, Insaniyat Ke Dushman, Insaf Ki Pukar, Khudgarz, Sherni, Khoon Bhari Maang, Sone Pe Suhaaga and Vardi. From 1988, he starred in films written with him in main lead, like Karz Chukana Hai, Jaisi Karni Waisi Bharnii, Biwi Ho To Aisi, Ghar Ho To Aisa, Hum Hain Kamaal Ke and Baap Numbri Beta Dus Numbri.

His first attempt at comedy was with Himmatwala and Aaj Ka Daur. He started doing main comedy roles from 1989 onwards, with films like Kishen Kanhaiya, Hum, Ghar Parivar, Bol Radha Bol and continued through the nineties with comedy roles in Aankhen, Taqdeerwala, Main Khiladi Tu Anari, Dulhe Raja, Coolie No. 1, Saajan Chale Sasural, Sooryavansham, Judaai, Aunty No. 1, Bade Miyan Chote Miyan, Raja Babu, Khuddar, Chhote Sarkar, Gharwali Baharwali, Hero Hindustani, Sirf Tum and Anari No. 1. Even in early 2000s, he attempted versatile roles with films like Akhiyon Se Goli Maare, Chalo Ishq Ladaaye, Suno Sasurjee, Yeh Hai Jalwa and Mujhse Shaadi Karogi. His work as a comedian was notable in Himmatwala, Aankhen and Coolie No. 1.

He starred in his comedy television series titled Hasna Mat (transl. Don't laugh), which aired on Star Plus in 2001. He made a comeback on Indian television with a comedy series Hi! Padosi... Kaun Hai Doshi? on Sahara One.

Khan later appeared in Lucky: No Time for Love (2006) and Family: Ties of Blood (2006). His last screen appearance was in Masti Nahi Sasti (2017).

=== Screenwriter ===
Rajesh Khanna is credited with giving Khan his break as a dialogue writer in his film Roti and thereafter he wrote dialogues for films with Rajesh Khanna in the lead like Maha Chor, Chhailla Babu, Dharam Kanta, Fiffty Fiffty, Naya Kadam, Masterji, and Nasihat, all of which were hit films at the box office. Other successful films for which he has written or assisted in dialogues include films starring Jeetendra like Himmatwala, Jaani Dost, Sarfarosh, Justice Chaudhury, Farz Aur Kanoon, Jeeo Aur Jeene Do, Tohfa, Qaidi and Haisiyat.

As a screenwriter, Kader Khan has worked with Manmohan Desai and Prakash Mehra for their films starring Amitabh Bachchan. Besides Amitabh, he was the only one to work in the rival camps of Mehra and Desai. His films with Desai include Dharam Veer, Gangaa Jamunaa Saraswati, Coolie, Desh Premee, Suhaag, Parvarish and Amar Akbar Anthony and films with Prakash Mehra include Jwalamukhi, Sharaabi, Lawaaris and Muqaddar Ka Sikandar.

Some of Amitabh Bachchan's films with popular dialogues and scripts were written by Khan. Some notable examples of these movies are Mr. Natwarlal, Khoon Pasina, Do Aur Do Paanch, Satte Pe Satta, Inquilab, Giraftaar, Hum and Agneepath. For the film Agneepath starring Bachchan, had received the National Film Awards.

Khan was in demand by South Indian film production houses such as Padmalaya. Major filmmakers of southern cinema such as Narayana Rao Dasari, K. Bapayya, K. Raghavendra Rao, T. Rama Rao, Dasari Narayan Rao, D. Rama Naidu consulted Khan for doing the script and dialogue of the Hindi remakes of their southern language films. Some of these films included Himmatwala (1983), Justice Chaudhury (1983), Haisiyat (1984) and Singhasan (1986). As reported in The Hindu, "He didn't just translate the original films into Hindi but transposed them into a new North setting, culture, context and language."

He was the preferred dialogue writer for the Hindi films directed by K. Raghavendra Rao, Narayana Dasari Rao, K. Bapaiah and for films produced by D. Rama Naidu and K. C. Bokadia. He also wrote dialogues in other successful films in the late '80s to the late '90s like Meri Aawaz Suno, Angaar, Jail Yatra, Satte Pe Satta, Katilon Ke Kaatil, Waqt Ki Awaz, Coolie No. 1, Main Khiladi Tu Anari, Kanoon Apna Apna, Karma, Sultanat, Baap Numbri Beta Dus Numbri, Humshakal, Saajan Chale Sasural, Hero Hindustani, Aunty No. 1, and Rajaji. He also wrote dialogues for films of Rakesh Roshan like Khoon Bhari Maang, Kala Bazaar and Khudgarz.

== Personal life ==
Khan lived in Mumbai, until moving to Toronto for health reasons. He had three sons: actor Sarfaraz Khan, director Shahnawaz Khan, and Abdul Quddus, who lived in Canada and died in 2021. It was reported that Khan took the citizenship of Canada. In 2014, Khan visited Mecca to perform Hajj.

== Death ==
Khan had supranuclear palsy, a degenerative disease. He was hospitalised on 28 December 2018 complaining of "breathlessness" in Canada, where he stayed with his youngest son and daughter-in-law while seeking treatment. On 31 December 2018 (EST), Khan's eldest son, Sarfaraz, confirmed that Khan had died. His funeral was held at ISNA mosque in Mississauga, and he is buried in Brampton's Meadowvale Cemetery.

== Awards and nominations ==
- 2013: Sahitya Shiromani Award for his work and contributions to the Hindi Film industry and Cinema.
- Khan was recognised twice by the AFMI (American Federation of Muslims from India) for his achievements and service to the Muslim community in India.
- On 26 January 2019, the Government of India announced to posthumously award Kader Khan the Padma Shri.

Filmfare Awards
Category	Film	Year	Status	Notes
Best Dialogue	Meri Awaaz Suno	1982	Won	
Best Comedian	Baap Numbri Beta Dus Numbri	1991	Won	
Best Dialogue	Angaar	1993	Won	
Best Comedian	Himmatwala	1984	Nominated	
Best Comedian	Aaj Ka Daur	1986	Nominated	
Best Comedian	Shakka	1990	Nominated	
Best Comedian	Hum	1992	Nominated	
Best Comedian	Aankhen	1994	Nominated	
Best Comedian	Main Khiladi Tu Anari	1995	Nominated	
Best Comedian	Coolie No. 1	1996	Nominated	
Best Comedian	Saajan Chale Sasural	1997	Nominated	
Best Comedian	Dulhe Raja	1999	Nominated	
