= Tohfa Mohabbat Ka =

- Directed by: Ram Govind
- Written by: Ram Govind
- Produced by: Maya Govind
- Starring: Govinda; Kimi Katkar; Hema Malini
- Cinematography: SRK Moorthy
- Edited by: Narinder Arora
- Music by: Anup Jalota
- Production company: Bahar Pictures
- Release date: 22 July 1988
- Country: India
- Language: Hindi

Tohfa Mohabbat Ka is a 1988 Bollywood drama film directed by Ram Govind and produced by Maya Govind.

== Cast ==
- Raj Kumar as Vinay
- Kimi Katkar as Radha
- Hema Malini as Seema
- Preeti Ganguli as Vinita
- Johnny Lever as Fakruddin
- Gulshan Grover as Virendra
- Bharat Kapoor as Gopal

== Music ==
Anup Jalota composed all the songs.

Song	Singer
"Aa Dekh Teri Radha"	Asha Bhosle
"Gori O Gori Sun Sun"	Asha Bhosle, Anup Jalota
"Tohfa Mohabbat Ka"	Asha Bhosle, Anup Jalota
"Pyar Se Pyara Kuch Bhi Nahin"	Anuradha Paudwal, Anup Jalota
"Suno Brij Ki Kahani, Log Meri Zubani"	Alka Yagnik, Anup Jalota, Chandrani Mukherjee
"Prem Ka Granth"	Parveen Sultana
"Sone Ki Tagdi"	Kirti Kumar
