= Taqdeer Ka Tamasha =

- Theatrical release poster
- Directed by: Anand Gaekwad
- Written by: K.K.Singh (dialogues)
- Screenplay by: Anand Gaekwad
- Story by: Mukesh Bakshi
- Produced by: Anand Gaekwad
- Starring: Jeetendra; Govinda; Aditya Pancholi; Moushumi Chatterjee; Kimi Katkar; Mandakini
- Cinematography: Sunil Sharma
- Edited by: Subhash Gupta
- Music by: Anand–Milind
- Production company: Film Group
- Release date: 12 January 1990
- Running time: 169 minutes
- Country: India
- Language: Hindi

Taqdeer Ka Tamasha (transl. Farce of Fate) is a 1990 Hindi-language action film produced and directed by Anand Gaekwad, who also wrote the screenplay. The film stars Jeetendra, Govinda, Aditya Pancholi, Moushumi Chatterjee, Kimi Katkar, Mandakini in the pivotal roles, with music composed by Anand–Milind.The film was a hit.

== Cast ==
- Jeetendra as Satyadev / Deva
- Govinda as Satya
- Aditya Pancholi as Inspector Surya
- Moushumi Chatterjee as Geeta
- Kimi Katkar as Jhumri
- Mandakini as Rajni
- Satish Kaushik as Havaldar Sharma
- Gulshan Grover as Gurughantal Dhaniya Pandey
- Sadashiv Amrapurkar as Sheshnaag
- Suresh Chatwal as Bhandari

== Soundtrack ==
#	Title	Singer(s)
1	"Som Ho Mangal Ho"	Amit Kumar, Sadhana Sargam
2	"Apni Biwi Bachon Ke Kareeb"	Mohammed Aziz, Anuradha Paudwal
3	"Apni Biwi Bachon Ke Kareeb (sad)"	Mohammed Aziz, Anuradha Paudwal
4	"Aaja Mere Paas Aa"	Udit Narayan
5	"O Thanedaar Babu"	Alka Yagnik
6	"Naye Daur Ka Dekho Logon"	Anand, Sadhna Sargam
