= List of Hindi films of 1987 =

The hindi films that were produced in 1987 in Mumbai

Dharmendra was the Most Successful Actor of the year.

== Highest-grossing films ==
The highest-grossing films at the Indian box office in 1987:

Rank	Title	Gross collection
1	Hukumat	₹11 crore
2	Mr. India	₹10 crore
3	Khudgarz	₹9.5 crore
4	Aag Hi Aag	₹9 crore

== Films ==
A list of films produced by the Bollywood film industry based in Mumbai in 1987:

Title	Director	Cast	Genre	Source
108 Teerthyatra	Rajpati	Pravin Anand, Nayan Bhatt, Jeetu	Comedy, Drama, Fantasy	
7 Saal Baad	S.U. Syed	Major Anand, Chandrashekhar, Anil Chaudhary	Romance, Horror, Drama, Fantasy	
Aag Hi Aag	Shibu Mitra	Dharmendra, Shatrughan Sinha, Moushumi Chatterjee, Neelam Kothari	Action	
Aage Mod Hai				
Aaj	Mahesh Bhatt	Raj Babbar, Kumar Gaurav, Raj Kiran	Drama	
Ahsaan	Balwant Dullat	Raj Babbar, Amjad Khan, Raj Kiran, Smita Patel		
Anjaam	T. Hariharan	Shafi Inamdar, Shashi Kapoor, Hema Malini		
Apne Apne	Ramesh Behl	Jeetendra, Rekha, Hema Malini	Drama	
Aulad	Vijay Sadanah	Jeetendra, Jaya Prada, Sridevi	Drama	
Awam	B. R. Chopra	Rajesh Khanna, Ashok Kumar, Smita Patil	Adventure, Mystery, Thriller	
Bandhani	Ketan Mehta			
Banoo	Madan Jain	Jayshree T.		
Besahara	B. R. Ishara	Rajan Sippy, Kader Khan, Priya Tendulkar	Drama	
Dacait	Rahul Rawail	Sunny Deol, Meenakshi Seshadri, Urmila Matondkar, Rakhee Gulzar,	Action	
Dadagiri	Deepak S. Shivdasani	Dharmendra, Govinda, Rati Agnihotri	Action, Crime, Drama, Romance	
Dak Bangla	Keshu Ramsay	Aaloka, Bhakti Bhansali, Leena Das	Horror	
Daku Hasina	Ashok Roy	Zeenat Aman, Rajinikanth, Pradeep Kumar	Action	
Dance Dance	B. Subhash	Mithun Chakraborty, Smita Patil, Mandakini, Shakti Kapoor		
Daraar	Abbas–Mustan	Kiran Kumar, Chunky Pandey	Psychological Thriller	
Deewana Tere Naam Ka	Deepak Bahry	Master Bhagwan, Mithun Chakraborty, Leena Das, Vijeta Pandit	Romance, Drama	
Dil Tujhko Diya	Rakesh Ranjan Kumar	Kumar Gaurav, Rati Agnihotri, Mala Sinha		
Diljalaa	Bapu	Rita Bhaduri, Kamal Chopra, Danny Denzongpa, Farha Naaz	Action, Crime, Drama, Romance	
Dilruba Tangewali	S. R. Pratap	Hemant Birje, Sripradha, Pran, Deva, Rajendra Nath, Krishna Devi, Chand Usmani		
Dozakh	Suhas Khandke	Pallavi Bhatt, Trilok Kapoor, Suhas Khandke		
Ek Aur Itihas	Prakash Jha			
Ek Chor Ek Hasina	K. Ragavendra Rao	Sridevi, Krishna Ghattamaneni		
Ek Ladki Badnaam Si				
Faqeer Badshah	Subhash	Danny Denzongpa, Roma Manik, Bindu	Action	
Ghar Ka Sukh	Kalpataru	Raj Kiran		
Goraa	Desh Gautam	Rajesh Khanna, Sulakshana Pandit, Raj Kiran, Pran		
Gulami Ki Zaanjeerein		Kader Khan		
Hamari Jung	Rajesh Bahaduri	Mohan Choti, Irshad Khan, Rajshri Nair	Action	
Hawalaat	Surendra Mohan	Mithun Chakraborty, Rishi Kapoor, Padmini Kolhapure, Mandakini	Action, Drama, Adventure, Crime	
Hifazat	Prayag Raj	Ashok Kumar, Nutan, Anil Kapoor, Madhuri Dixit, Pran	Drama, Family	
Himmat Aur Mehanat	K. Bapaiah	Shammi Kapoor, Jeetendra, Poonam Dhillon	Action, Drama	
Hiraasat	Surendra Mohan	Shatrughan Sinha, Mithun Chakraborty, Hema Malini, Anita Raj	Action, Crime, Drama	
Hukumat	Anil Sharma	Dharmendra, Rati Agnihotri	Action	
Ijaazat	Gulzar	Rekha, Naseeruddin Shah, Anuradha Patel	Drama, Musical, Romance	
Imaandaar	Sushil Malik	Sanjay Dutt, Farah, Pran	Action, Crime, Drama	
Inaam Dus Hazaar	Jyotin Goel	Sanjay Dutt, Meenakshi Seshadri, Amrish Puri	Action	
Insaaf	Mukul S. Anand	Vinod Khanna, Dimple Kapadia, Suresh Oberoi	Action	
Insaf Ki Pukar	T. Rama Rao	Dharmendra, Jeetendra, Anita Raj, Bhanupriya		
Insaniyat Ke Dushman	Rajkumar Kohli	Dharmendra, Shatrughan Sinha, Anita Raj, Dimple Kapadia	Action	
Itihaas	V. Joshi	Raaj Kumar, Shabana Azmi, Anil Kapoor, Rati Agnihotri	Drama, Family	
Jaago Hua Savera	Shaukat Jamali	Shoma Anand, A.K. Hangal, Rohini Hattangadi		
Jaan Hatheli Pe	R. Jhalani	Dharmendra, Jeetendra, Raj Babbar, Rekha, Hema Malini	Action	
Jalwa	Pankaj Parashar	Naseeruddin Shah, Archna Pooran Singh, Rohini Hattangady, Amitabh Bachchan	Action	
Jawab Hum Denge	Vijay Reddi	Jackie Shroff, Sridevi, Shatrughan Sinha		
Jhanjhaar	V. Shantaram	Padmini Kolhapure, Sushant Roy, Ranjana Deshmukh, Sudhir Pandey, Yunus Parvez	Social Drama	
Kamagni	Ashok Kumar	Sujit Kumar, Shreeram Lagoo, Tina Munim	Drama, Music	
Kaash	Mahesh Bhatt	Jackie Shroff, Dimple Kapadia, Master Makrand	Drama, Family	
Kachchi Kali	K.R. Rangan	Sonika Gill, Kapil Karzan, Ajinkya Deo		
Kalyug Aur Ramayan	Babubhai Mistry	Manoj Kumar, Rajiv Goswami, Madhavi	Drama	
Kaun Jeeta Kaun Haara	Rakesh Kumar	Amitabh Bachchan, Kishore Kumar	Drama	
Kaun Kitney Pani Mein		Mahendra Sandhu		
Khazana	Harmesh Malhotra	Randhir Kapoor, Rekha, Bindu	Action, Crime, Drama, Thriller	
Khooni Darinda	Dhirubai Daxini	Abhi Bhattacharya, Jayshree Gadkar, Mohan Choti	Horror	
Khooni Mahal	Mohan Bhakri	Shoma Anand, Neelam Mehra, Hussein Khan	Horror	
Khudgarz	Rakesh Roshan	Jeetendra, Shatrughan Sinha, Govinda, Amrita Singh, Bhanupriya, Neelam Kothari	Drama, Family, Musical	
Kudrat Ka Kanoon	S. A. Chandrasekhar	Hema Malini, Radhika, Jackie Shroff		
Loha	Raj Shippy	Dharmendra, Shatrughan Sinha, Karan Kapoor, Madhavi, Mandakini, Amrish Puri, Kader Khan	Action, Crime, Drama	
Maa Beti	Kalpataru	Shashi Kapoor, Sharmila Tagore, Meenakshi Seshadri, Sachin Pilgaonkar, Tanuja, Pran, Kader Khan	Drama	
Maashuka	Arati Bhattacharya	Kunal Kapoor, Moon Moon Sen, Arun Govil	Romance	
Madadgaar	Ramanesh Puri	Jeetendra, Sulakshana Pandit, Aruna Irani	Action, Crime, Drama, Romance	
Maha Yatra	Goutam Ghose	Shatrughan Sinha, Mohan Agashe, Kalyan Chatterjee, Vasant Choudhury	Drama, Thriller	
Majaal	K. Bapaiah	Sadashiv Amrapurkar, Vikas Anand, Asrani	Drama	
Mard Ki Zabaan	K. Bapaiah	Dharmendra, Poonam Dhillon, Kimi Katkar, Jackie Shroff, Sushma Seth	Action	
Marte Dam Tak	Mehul Kumar	Raaj Kumar, Govinda, Farah	Crime Drama	
Mera Karam Mera Dharam	Dulal Guha	Dharmendra, Moushumi Chatterjee, Johnny Walker		
Mera Lahoo	Veerendra	Govinda, Kimi Katkar	Action, Crime, Drama	
Mera Suhag	Ajay Sharma	Rati Agnihotri, Pankaj Dheer, Deepti Naval		
Mera Yaar Mera Dushman	Anil Ganguly	Ardhendu Bose, Mithun Chakraborty, Bindiya Goswami	Musical	
Mirch Masala	Ketan Mehta	Ram Gopal Bajaj, Benjamin Gilani, Mohan Gokhale	Thriller	
Mr. India	Shekhar Kapur	Anil Kapoor, Sridevi, Amrish Puri, Ashok Kumar	Action, Adventure, Comedy, Drama, Science Fiction, Musical, Fantasy	
Mr. X	Khwaja Ahmad Abbas	Amol Palekar, Shabana Azmi	Science Fiction	
Muqaddar Ka Faisla	Prakash Mehra	Raaj Kumar, Rakhee Gulzar, Raj Babbar, Tina Munim, Meenakshi Seshadri, Pran	Drama, Family	
Naam O Nishan	Ajay Kashyap	Shashi Kapoor, Sanjay Dutt, Amrita Singh, Nirupa Roy	Action, Thriller	
Nafrat		Shoma Anand, Mazhar Khan		
Nazrana	Ravi Tandon	Rajesh Khanna, Sridevi, Priti Sapru	Drama	
Param Dharam	Swaroop Kumar	Mithun Chakraborty, Mandakini	Action, Crime, Drama	
Parivaar	Shashilal Nair	Mithun Chakraborty, Meenakshi Seshadri, Shakti Kapoor	Drama	
Pratighaat	N. Chandra	Nana Patekar, Sujata Mehta, Arvind Kumar, Charan Raj	Drama	
Pyaar Karke Dekho	D. Rajendra Babu	Govinda, Mandakini, Kader Khan	Family	
Pyaar Ke Do Chaar Din		Madhu Malhotra		
Pyaar Ki Jeet	Saawan Kumar Tak	Shashi Kapoor, Vinod Mehra, Rekha	Comedy, Drama, Musical	
Pyar Ke Kabil	Anil Ganguly	Rishi Kapoor, Padmini Kolhapure, Asha Sachdev	Drama, Family, Romance	
Raahee	Raman Kumar	Sanjeev Kumar, Shatrughan Sinha, Smita Patil	Action, Crime, Drama, Romance	
Raat Ke Andhere Mein	Vinod Talwar	Javed Khan, Dipika, Mazhar Khan		
Rajlakshmi		Farooq Sheikh, Sujata Mehta, Ashwini Bhave		
Sadak Chhap	Anil Ganguly	Jackie Shroff, Padmini Kolhapure, Richa Sharma	Crime, Drama	
Sansar	T. Rama Rao	Rekha, Raj Babbar, Anupam Kher, Aruna Irani, Archana Jogelkar	Drama	
Satyamev Jayate	Raj Sippy	Vinod Khanna, Meenakshi Seshadri, Madhavi	Action	
Sheela	Deepak Balraj Vij	Kulbhushan Kharbanda, Nana Patekar, Ranjeeta Kaur, Charan Raj, Sahila Chaddha		
Sher Shivaji	Ram Narayan Gabale	Parikshit Sahni, Smita Patil, Shriram Lagoo		
Sindoor	K. Ravi Shankar	Shashi Kapoor, Govinda, Neelam Kothari	Drama	
Sitapur Ki Geeta	Shibu Mittra	Rajesh Khanna, Hema Malini, Pran	Action, Crime	
Superman	B. Gupta	Dharmendra, Ranjeeta Kaur	Science Fiction	
Susman	Shyam Benegal	Shabana Azmi, Om Puri, Kulbhushan Kharbanda	Drama	
Sutradhar	Chandrakant Joshi	Girish Karnad, Smita Patil, Nilu Phule	Drama	
Thikana	Mahesh Bhatt	Smita Patil, Anil Kapoor, Amrita Singh	Crime, Drama	
Uttar Dakshin	Prabhat Khanna	Rajinikanth, Jackie Shroff, Bharathi Vishnuvardhan, Madhuri Dixit	Action	
Vali-E-Azam		Padma Khanna		
Vishaal	Dinesh	Bindiya Goswami, Kulbhushan Kharbanda, Vinod Mehra	Drama, Romance	
Watan Ke Rakhwale		Sunil Dutt, Dharmendra, Mithun Chakraborty, Sridevi, Moushumi Chatterjee	Drama	
Woh Din Aayega	Satyen Bose	Ashok Kumar, Rajan Sippy, Raj Kiran		
Yeh Woh Manzil To Nahin	Sudhir Mishra	Manohar Singh, Habib Tanvir, B.M. Shah	Drama	
Zameen	Ramesh Sippy			
Zevar	Basu Chatterji	Anupam Kher, Alok Nath, Ravi Baswani	Drama, Comedy, Family, Romance	

== See also ==
- List of Hindi films of 1986
- List of Hindi films of 1988
