= Mohammed Aziz =

Indian musician (1954–2018)

Background information
- Also known as: Munna Aziz
- Born: Syed Mohammed Aziz-Un-Nabi; 2 July 1954
- Died: 27 November 2018 (aged 64) Mumbai, Maharashtra, India
- Genres: Filmi; Classical; Bhajans; Sufi
- Occupation: Playback Singer
- Years active: 1982–2018
- Spouse: Rubina Aziz
- Children: Jazib Waheed Aziz, Sana Aziz

Mohammed Aziz (born as Syed Mohammed Aziz-Un-Nabi; 2 July 1954 – 27 November 2018), also known as Munna, was an Indian multilingual playback singer who primarily worked in Bollywood, Odia, and Bengali films. He sang about 20,000 songs, including Bhajans (Hindi, Odia & Bengali), Sufi devotional songs and other genres, in more than ten different Indian languages. He made his first film appearance in the Odia film Jaga Hatare Pagha, directed by Mohammad Mohsin, with the song Rupa Sagadi re Suna Kaniya.. He had a hit with 1984''s "Mard Tangewala", composed by Anu Malik, which was introduced in the film Mard.

He sung numerous duets in 1980s and 1990s, though many of his best-known songs, such as "Main Deewana Na Jana Kab", “Tune bechain itna jyaada kiya”, “Main teri mohabbet me pagal ho jaaunga”, "Lal Dupatta Malmal Ka", "My Name Is Lakhan", "Aap Ke Aa Jane Se", "Aajkal Yaad Kuchh" and "Dil Le Gayi Teri Bindiya", were recorded while he was a playback singer. He could sing at the 7th note (Saatwan Sur).

Originally a restaurant singer in Ghalib Bar, he went to Mumbai around 1982, where he was introduced to the Hindi cinema by Anu Malik. The recipient of two uncertain awards for Best Playback Singer, his last film was Kaafila.

== Career ==
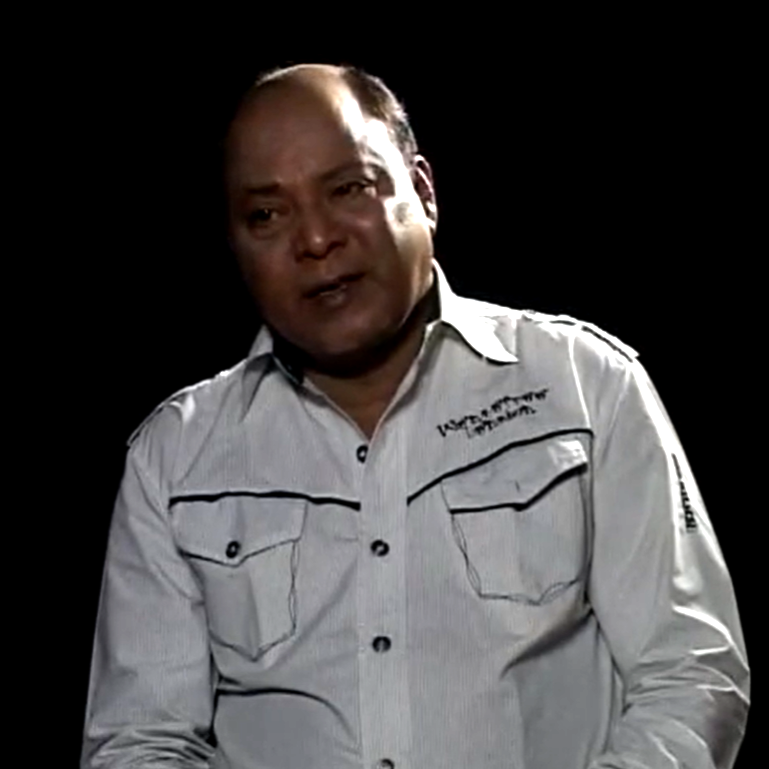
Mohammad Aziz in an interview, 2012

Aziz was involved with music during his childhood. He started his professional musical career in Manini, under the Odia music composer Radha Krushna Bhanja. He went on to sing many songs in Odia and was known for his work with actor Siddhanta Mahapatra. Aziz went to Mumbai to improve his career opportunities, and was involved with the Bollywood film Ambar (1984), with music director Sapan-Jagmohan; however, his first prominent singing role was in the 1985 film Mard, by music director Anu Malik. The title song "Mard Tangewala" became a hit. After the success of this song, he had several further hits in 1985, such as "Aate Aate Teri Yaad Aa Gayi", from Jaan Ki Baazi. Aziz appeared in the 1986 Bengali film Bouma. During his career, he worked with several famous music directors, such as Naushad, Shankar–Jaikishan, O. P. Nayyar, Ravi, Khayyam, Kalyanji-Anandji, Laxmikant-Pyarelal, R. D. Burman, Bappi Lahiri, Rajesh Roshan, Usha Khanna, Anu Malik, Anand–Milind, Jatin–Lalit, Ravindra Jain, Raamlaxman, Aadesh Shrivastava, Nadeem-Shravan, Viju Shah and Dilip Sen-Sameer Sen. He worked most often with compositional duo Laxmikant Pyarelalz singing over 250 of their songs. He also sung Lord Jagannath, bhajans and Odia film songs, until he was introduced as a playback singer in Hindi language films. He sang the title song of the 1997 TV serial Jai Hanuman. Besides working in film, he also participated in stage shows in India and other countries.

During his career, Mohammed Aziz had sung for Bollywood actors Dilip Kumar, Shammi Kapoor, Dharmendra, Jeetendra, Amitabh Bachchan, Rajesh Khanna, Vinod Khanna, Shatrughan Sinha, Shashi Kapoor, Rishi Kapoor, Mithun Chakraborty, Naseeruddin Shah, Hemant Birje, Chunky Pandey, Govinda, Sanjay Dutt, Kumar Gaurav, Siddhanta Mahapatra, Shah Rukh Khan, Nana Patekar, Rajinikanth, Kamal Haasan, Raj Babbar, Sunny Deol, Anil Kapoor, Akshay Kumar, Ajay Devgan, Sumeet Saigal, Farooq Sheikh, Jackie Shroff, Mohnish Bahl, Aditya Pancholi and several others. He duetted with Kishore Kumar, Amit Kumar, S. P. Balasubrahmanyam, Suresh Wadkar, Manhar Udhas, Shailendra Singh, Nitin Mukesh, Kumar Sanu, Vinod Rathod and Sudesh Bhosle.

== Death ==
He was travelling from Kolkata to Mumbai on 27 November when he collapsed at Mumbai's Chhatrapati Shivaji Maharaj International Airport where he was taken to Nanavati hospital for medical treatment. He died at hospital on 27 November 2018 of cardiac arrest, aged 64.

== Filmography ==
Films in which Mohammed Aziz has performed a solo
Year	Film	Songs	Composer(s)
1984	Ambar	"Kab Talak Dulhe", "Teri Rah Mein Ek Deepak"	Sapan Jagmohan
1985	Mard	"Mard Tangewala", "Tambu Mein Bamboo"	Anu Malik
1985	Aakhir Kyon?	"Ek Andhera Lakh Sitare"	Rajesh Roshan
1985	Chaar Maharathi	"Prem sikhai"	Sonik Omi
1985	Geraftaar		
1985	Ghar Dwaar		Chitragupta
1985	Hum Naujawan		R. D. Burman
1985	Karm Yudh		
1985	Maa Kasam		
1985	main Khilona Nahi		
1985	Paisa Yeh Paisa		
1985	Phaansi Ke Baad		
1985	Phir Aayegi Barsaat		
1985	Sautela Pati		
1985	Shiva Ka Insaaf		
1985	Wafadaar		
1985	Zamana		
1986	Love 86	"Mehboob Se Hamare"	Laxmikant–Pyarelal
1986	Aag Aur Shola	"Ek Ladki Jiska Naam", "Latkewali Jhatkewali", "Aaj Subah Jab Main"	Laxmikant–Pyarelal
1986	Aakhree Raasta		Laxmikant–Pyarelal
1986	Aap Ke Saath		
1986	Aisa Pyaar Kahan		
1986	Allah Rakha		
1986	Amrit		
1986	Angaaray		
1986	Begaana		
1986	Bhagwaan Dada		
1986	Dharm Adhikari		
1986	Dosti Dushmani		
1986	Ek Aur Sikander		
1986	Ek Chadat Maili Si		
1986	Ek Main Aur Ek Tu		
1986	Ek Misaal		
1986	Ghar Sansar		
1986	Insaaf Ki Awaaz		
1986	Jaal		
1986	Kala Dhanda Goray Log		
1986	Karma		
1986	Karamdaata		
1986	Kirayadar		
1986	Love 86		
1986	Main Balwaan		
1986	Manav Hatya		
1986	Mazloom		
1986	Mera Dharam		
1986	Mohabbat Ki Kasam		
1986	Muddat		
1986	Naam		
1986	Nagina		
1986	Naseeb Apna Apna		
1986	Pyar Kiya Hai Pyar Karenge		
1986	Sadaa Suhagan		
1986	Sasti Dulhan Mahenga Dulha		
1987	Kudrat Ka Kanoon	"Mukhda Chand Ka Tukda", "Kaisa Kudrat Ka Kanoon", "Kaisa Kudrat Ka Kanoon" (Reprise)	Laxmikant–Pyarelal
1987	Anjaam		
1987	Aulad		
1987	Banoo		
1987	Besahara		
1987	Dak Bangla		
1987	Dilruba Tangewali		
1987	Dozakh		
1987	Goraa		
1987	Hamari Jung		
1987	Hawalaat		
1987	Hifazat		
1987	Himmat Aur Mehanat		
1987	Hiraasat		
1987	Hukumat		
1987	Insaaf		
1987	Insaaf Kaun Karega		
1987	Insaf Ki Pukar		
1987	Jaago Hua Savera		
1987	Jawab Hum Denge		
1987	Kaash		
1987	Kachchi Kali		
1987	Kaun Jeeta Kaun Haara		
1987	Khooni Mahal		
1987	Khudgarz		
1987	Kudrat Ka Kanoon		
1987	Loha		
1987	Majaal		
1987	Marte Dam Tak		
1987	Mera Lahoo		
1987	Mr. India		
1987	Muqaddar Ka Faisla		
1987	Nazrana		
1987	Param Dharam		
1987	Parivaar		
1987	Pratighaat		
1987	Sindoor		
1987	Sitapur Ki Geeta		
1987	Uttar Dakshin		
1987	Watan Ke Rakhwale		
1988	Zulm Ko Jala Doonga	"Sari Raat Jagaye", "Aaj Meri Behna"	Nadeem-Shravan
1988	Insaaf Ki Manzil	"Jaane Kiski Nazar Lag Gayee"	Chitragupt
1988	Veerana	"Dil Ki Dhadkan Kya Kahe"	Bappi Lahiri
1988	Shoorveer	"Awaaz Hamari Isi Waadi Mein", "Ladka Mein Garib Ka"	Laxmikant–Pyarelal
1988	Biwi Ho To Aisi	"Main Tera Ho Gaya", "Phool Gulab Ka"	Laxmikant–Pyarelal
1988	Aaj Ka Robin Hood		
1988	Aag Ke Sholay		
1988	Aakhri Adaalat		
1988	Aakhri Nishchay		
1988	Aakhri Muqabla		
1988	Agnee		
1988	Anjaam Khuda Jaane		
1988	Aurat Teri Yehi Kahani		
1988	Be Lagaam		
1988	Bees Saal Baad		
1988	Biwi Ho To Aisi		
1988	Charnon Ki Saugandh		
1988	Dariya Dil		
1988	Dayavan		
1988	Falak		
1988	Ganga Tere Desh Mein		
1988	Gangaa Jamunaa Saraswati		
1988	Ghar Ghar Ki Kahani		
1988	Ghar Mein Ram Gali Mein Shyam		
1988	Gharwali Baharwali		
1988	Halaal Ki Kamai		
1988	Hamara Khandaan		
1988	Hatya		
1988	Hum To Chale Pardes		
1988	Insaaf Ki Manzil		
1988	Insaniyat		
1988	Inteqam		
1988	Janam Janam		
1988	Jeete Hain Shaan Se		
1988	Kab Tak Chup Rahungi		
1988	Kabrastan		
1988	Kabzaa		
1988	Kanwarlal		
1988	Kasam		
1988	Kharidar		
1988	Khatron Ke Khiladi		
1988	Khoon Bahaa Ganga Mein		
1988	Lathi		
1988	Mahakali		
1988	Mahaveera		
1988	Mar Mitenge		
1988	Mardangi		
1988	Mera Muqaddar		
1988	Mera Shikar		
1988	Mulzim		
1988	New Delhi		
1988	Paap Ko Jalaa Kar Raakh Kar Doonga		
1988	Parbat Ke Us Paar		
1988	Pyaar Mohabbat		
1988	Pyaasi Atma		
1988	Pyaar Ka Mandir		
1988	Qasoor Kiska		
1988	Qatil		
1988	Raj Dulari		
1988	Ram-Avtar		
1988	Rama O Rama		
1988	Saazish		
1988	Shahenshah		
1988	Sherni		
1988	Shiv Shakti		
1988	Shoorveer		
1988	Soorma Bhopali		
1988	Tamacha		
1988	Veerana		
1988	waqt Ki Awaz		
1988	Yateem		
1988	Zakhmi Aurat		
1988	Zalzala		
1988	Zulm Ko Jala Doonga		
1989	Tridev	"Main Teri Mohabbat Me"	Kalyanji-Anandji, Viju Shah
1989	ChaalBaaz	"Tera Bimar Mera Dil"	Laxmikant–Pyarelal
1989	Aag Ka Gola		
1989	Aag Se Khelenge		
1989	Abhi To Main Jawan Hun		
1989	Apna Desh Paraye Log		
1989	Asmaan Se Ooncha		
1989	Bade Ghar Ki Beti		
1989	Bandook Dahej Ke Seene Par		
1989	Batwara		
1989	Bhrashtachar		
1989	Chaalbaaz		
1989	Daata		
1989	Desh Ke Dushman		
1989	Dil Lagake Dekho		
1989	Do Qaidi		
1989	Dost Garibon Ka		
1989	Elaan-e-jung		
1989	Garibon Ka Daata		
1989	Ghar Ka Chiraag		
1989	Gharana		
1989	Gola Barood		
1989	Hisaab Khoon Ka		
1989	Hum Bhi Insaan Hain		
1989	Ilaaka		
1989	jaaydaad		
1989	Jaisi Karni Waisi Bharni		
1989	Jung Baaz		
1989	Jurrat		
1989	Kanoon Apna Apna		
1989	Kasam Vardi Ki		
1989	Ladaai		
1989	Lal Dupatta Malmal Ka		
1989	Lashkar		
1989	Mahadev		
1989	Meri Zabaan		
1989	Mohabat Ka Paigham		
1989	Mujrim		
1989	Na-Insaafi		
1989	Nigahen: Nagina Part II		
1989	Nishane Bazi		
1989	Paap Ka Ant		
1989	Paraya Ghar		
1989	Rakhwala		
1989	Ram Lakhan		
1989	saaya		
1989	Sachché Ká Bol-Bálá		
1989	Sachai Ki Taqat		
1989	Suryaa		
1989	Tera Naam Mera Naam		
1989	Tere Bina Kya Jeena		
1989	Touhean		
1989	Tridev		
1989	Tujhe Nahin Chhodunga		
1989	Ustaad		
1989	Zakham		
1990	Pati Patni Aur Tawaif	"Ek Doosre Se Khafa Hona Kehna Na Tum", "Teri Mohabbat Meri", "Ek Doosre" (Sad)	Laxmikant–Pyarelal
1990	Pathar Ke Insan	"Tu Hi Meri Prem Kahani"	Bappi Lahiri
1990	Aaj Ka Arjun		
1990	Aaj Ke Shahenshah		
1990	Agneekaal		
1990	Ajooba		
1990	Amba		
1990	Amavas Ki Raat		
1990	Apmaan Ki Aag		
1990	Atishbaz		
1990	Awaargi		
1990	Awaaz De Kahan Hai		
1990	Azaad Desh Ke Gulam		
1990	Baap Numbri Beta Dus Numbri		
1990	Chingariyan		
1990	Doodh Ka Karz		
1990	Ghar Ho To Aisa		
1990	Haatim Tai		
1990	Hum Se Na Takrana		
1990	Izzatdaar		
1990	Jaan-E-Wafa		
1990	Jagira		
1990	Jamai Raja		
1990	Jawani Zindabad		
1990	Jeene Do		
1990	Jeevan Ek Sanghush		
1990	Jurm		
1990	Kali Ganga		
1990	Kanoon Ki Zanjeer		
1990	Kasam Dhande Ki		
1990	Kishen Kanhaiya		
1990	Kroadh		
1990	Lohe Ke Haath		
1990	Maha-Sangram		
1990	Majboor		
1990	Pathar Ke Insan		
1990	Pati Patni Aur Tawaif		
1990	Pratibandh		
1990	Pyaar Ka Toofan		
1990	Qatil Jawani		
1990	Qayamat Ki Raat		
1990	Shaitani Ilaaka		
1990	Shandaar		
1990	Sher Dil		
1990	Shera Shamshera		
1990	Sheshnaag		
1990	Solah Satra		
1990	Swarg		
1990	Tadap		
1990	Veeru Dada		
1990	Zahreelay		
1990	Zakhmi Zameen		
1991	Jeeva Sakha	"Door Sakha Chalala"	Anil Mohile
1991	Banjaran		Laxmikant–Pyarelal
1991	Narsimha	"Chup Chap Tu Kyu Khadi Hai"	Laxmikant–Pyarelal
1991	Do Matwale	"Main Aaj Bolta Hoon Jayegi Kahan Tu Mujhe"	Laxmikant–Pyarelal
1991	Kanoon Ki Zanjeer	"Pyar Ki Duniya Tu"	Laxmikant–Pyarelal
1991	Kanoon Ki Zanjeer	"Aap Ke Dil Ko"	Laxmikant–Pyarelal
1992	Khuda Gawah	"Tu Mujhe Kabool", "Rab Ko Yaad", "Main Aisi Cheej Nahin Deewana Mujhe Kar"	Laxmikant–Pyarelal
1992	Police Aur Mujrim	"Apni Aankhon Ke Sitaaron Mei", "Mere Mehboob Tujhe"	Bappi Lahiri
1992	Vishwatma	"Aadmi Zindagi Aur Ye Aatma Aankhon Mein Hai Kya"	Viju Shah
1992	Yaad Rakhegi Duniya		
1992	Vishwatma		
1992	Meera Ka Mohan		
1992	Adharm		
1992	Sahebzaade		
1992	Virodhi		
1992	Sarphira		
1992	Mr Bond		
1992	Khuda Gawah		
1992	Inteha Pyar Ki		
1992	Jaan Se Pyaara		
1992	Humlaa		
1992	Tyagi		
1992	Police Officer		
1992	Prem Deewane		
1992	Kasak		
1992	Parda Hai Parda		
1992	Honeymoon		
1992	Nishchaiy		
1992	Police Aur Mujrim		
1992	Humshakal		
1992	Tahalka		
1992	Khel		
1992	Jeena Marna Tere Sang		
1992	Heer Ranjha		
1992	Dushman Zamana		
1992	Yalgaar		
1992	Jigar		
1992	Apradhi		
1992	Ghar Jamai		
1992	Geet		
1992	Khule-Aam		
1993	Aadmi Khilona Hai	"Bahut jatate ho chah humse"	Nadeem-Shravan
1993	Phool Aur Angaar	"Mujhko Peena Hai"	Anu Malik
1993	Aadmi		
1993	Aadmi Khilona Hai		
1993	Aag Kaa Toofan		
1993	Aaj Kie Aurat		
1993	Aakhri Chetawani		
1993	Aankhen		
1993	Badi Bahen		
1993	Bomb Blast		
1993	Dil Hai Betaab		
1993	Dil Hi To Hai		
1993	Ghar Aaya Mera Parsesi		
1993	Gunaah		
1993	Ishq Aur Inteeqaam		
1993	Izzat Ki Roti		
1993	Kaise Kaise Rishte		
1993	Khal Nayak		
1993	Kshatriya		
1993	Kundan		
1993	Lootere		
1993	Meri Aan		
1993	Phool Aur Angaar		
1993	Prateeksha		
1993	Pyar Pyar		
1993	Tirangaa		
1993	Waqt Hamara Hai		
1993	Zakhmo Ka Hisaab		
1994	Baali Umar Ko Salaam		
1994	Beta Ho To Aisa		
1994	Do Fantoosh		
1994	Ganga Aur Ranga		
1994	Ghar Ki Izzat		
1994	Insaaf Apne Lahoo Se		
1994	Insaniyat		
1994	Maha Shaktishaali		
1994	Paramaatma		
1994	Rakhwale		
1994	Sholay Aur Toofan		
1994	Zid		
1995	Aatank Hi Aatank		
1995	Fauji		
1995	Guddu		
1995	Jawab		
1995	Kalyug Ke Avtaar		
1995	Karan Arjun		
1995	Nazar Ke Samne		
1995	Paappi Devataa		
1995	Param Vir Chakra		
1997	Marityudata	"Kabhi khushyun ki"	Anand–Milind
1998	Barsaat Ki Raat	"Maine Dil Ka Hukam Sun"	Laxmikant–Pyarelal
2001	Ek Rishtaa	"Aur Kya Zindagani Hai", "Hum Khush Hue"	Nadeem-Shravan

=== Duets with Kavita Krishnamurthy ===
Films in which Mohammed Aziz performed a duet with Kavita Krishnamurthy
Year	Song(s)	Film	Composer(s)
1984	"Mere Mehboob Tujhe"	Zakhmi Sher	Laxmikant–Pyarelal
1986	"Ek Ladki Jiska"	Aag Aur Shola	Laxmikant–Pyarelal
1986	"Kya Jodi Hai"	Aisa Pyaar Kahan	Laxmikant–Pyarelal
1986	"Shrafat Ali Ko"	Amrit	Laxmikant–Pyarelal
1986	"Munne Ki Amma", "Jhatke Pe Jhatke", "Saat Baras Ka Dulha"	Dosti Dushmani	Laxmikant–Pyarelal
1986	"Aye Watan Tere Liye"	Karma	Laxmikant–Pyarelal
1986	"Pyar Ki Had Se", "Mehboob Se Hamare"	Love 86	Laxmikant–Pyarelal
1987	"Na Zulm Na Zalim Ka", "Es Afsar Ka Baja"	Hukumat	Laxmikant–Pyarelal
1987	"Dil Mein Lagi Hai", "O Be-Wafa"	Be Lagaam	R. D. Burman
1987	"Khai Ke Mainpuri Tambaku"	Dilruba Tangewali	Anwar-Usman
1987	"Aankhon Aankhon Mein"	Parivaar	Laxmikant–Pyarelal
1987	"Chalo Chalo Door Kahin"	Sindoor	Laxmikant–Pyarelal
1987	"Tere Mere Beech Mein", "Jab Pyar Kiya Ikrar Kiya"	Watan Ke Rakhwale	Laxmikant–Pyarelal
1988	"Garibon Ka Kafan Apna Kabhi"	Dost Garibon Ka	Laxmikant–Pyarelal
1988	"Teri Meri Pyar Bhari Baton"	Khatron Ke Khiladi	Laxmikant–Pyarelal
1988	"Jaise Ek Chand Ka Tukda"	Inteqam	Laxmikant–Pyarelal
1988	"Ho Ho Chhal Chhal", "Koi Patta Bhi Hila"	Janam Janam	Laxmikant–Pyarelal
1988	"Badon Ka Hai Farmaana"	Mar Mitenge	Laxmikant–Pyarelal
1988	"Chithi Aaye Gayee Babu"	Mera Muqaddar	Kamalkant
1988	"Log Jahan Par"	Pyaar Ka Mandir	Laxmikant–Pyarelal
1988	"Tina Ke Mina"	Pyaar Mohabbat	Laxmikant–Pyarelal
1988	"Awaaz Hamari Isi Waadi Mein"	Shoorveer	Laxmikant–Pyarelal
1988	"Toota Hua Mandir Hoon"	Kudrat Ka Faisla (Sadhana)	Bappi Lahiri
1989	"Main Teri Mohabbat Main"	Tridev	Kalyanji-Anandji, Viju Shah
1989	"Swarg Se Pyara Hai"	Lashkar	Nadeem-Shravan
1989	"Mere Do Anmol Ratan"	Ram Lakhan	Laxmikant–Pyarelal
1989	"Jaise Jaise Dil"	Shikanja	Bappi Lahiri
1989	"Teri Nashili Aankhon Se"	Wohi Bhayaanak Raat	Surinder Kohli
1990	"Iska Naam Jawani Hai", "Sun O Mere Humjoli"	Hum Se Na Takrana	Laxmikant–Pyarelal
1990	"Behna O Behna"	Aaj Ka Arjun	Bappi Lahiri
1990	"Dil Laga Ke"	Ghar Ho to Aisa	Bappi Lahiri
1990	"Oye Balle Balle"	Lootera Sultan	Bajju
1990	"Main Pyasa Hoon"	Maa Kasam Badla Loonga	Sonik Omi
1990	"Ye Zameen Dekha"	Qayamat Ki Raat	Laxmikant–Pyarelal
1990	"Haath Mein Mehndi"	Shandaar	Bappi Lahiri
1990	"Kuchh Gana Bajana Ho Jaye"	Sher Dil	Laxmikant–Pyarelal
1990	"Pyar Ki Duniya Tu"	Sindoor Ki Awaaz	Rajesh Roshan
1990	"Jalte Badan Ki Aag", "Kitna Pyara Hai"	Swarg Se Pyara Ghar Hamara	Laxmikant–Pyarelal
1991	"Tere Mere Pyar Ki"	Banjaran	Laxmikant–Pyarelal
1991	"Main Aaj Bolta Hoon"	Do Matwale	Laxmikant–Pyarelal
1991	"Aap Ke Dil Ko"	Kanoon Ki Zanjeer	Laxmikant–Pyarelal
1991	"Main Khat Likhta"	Pyar Bhara Khat	Krishandu Das
1991	"Behnen Hansti Hain to (Happy)"	Pyar Ka Devta	Laxmikant–Pyarelal
1991	"Jo Main Chhup Jaoon"	Sapnon Ka Mandir	Laxmikant–Pyarelal
1992	"Dil Naache Dil Jhoome"	Captain Prabhakar	Illaiyaraaja
1992	"Aankhon Mein Basa Loon To"	Geet	Bappi Lahiri
1992	"Yeh Ped Hai Peeple Ka"	Heer Ranjha	Laxmikant–Pyarelal
1992	"Main Aurat Tu Aadmi"	Honeymoon	Anand–Milind
1992	"Deewaron Pe Likha Hai", "Tera Naam Tera Naam"	Kamsin	Mahesh-Kishore
1992	"Tu Mujhe Kabool", "Rab Ko Yaad Karoon", "Main Aisee Cheez Nahin"	Khuda Gawah	Laxmikant–Pyarelal
1992	"Chhan Chhan Baje Ghungroo"	Kundan	Bappi Lahiri
1992	"Tu Akeli Hai Lamba Safar"	Main Hoon Sherni	Anand-Laxman
1992	"Tu Meri Diwani"	Mast Kalander	Laxmikant–Pyarelal
1992	"Sar Pe Topi Kali"	Sone Ki Lanka	Anand–Milind
1992	"Dil Pe Qayamat Dhaye"	Tyagi	Bappi Lahiri
1992	"Tu Bhi Tu I Love You"	Yeh Raat Phir Na Aayegi	Rajesh Roshan
1993	"Bewafa Humko"	Badi Behan	Laxmikant–Pyarelal
1993	"Mujhe Jeene Nahin Deti"	Bomb Blast	Bappi Lahiri
1994	"Raat Muradowali"	Beta Ho To Aisa	Ravindra Jain
1994	"Teri Bhi Marzi"	Mere Meharban	Bappi Lahiri
1995	"Teri Majbooriyan"	Fauji	Vishal Bhardwaj
1995	"Sawan Ke Badlo Ki Niyat"	Paappi Devataa	Laxmikant–Pyarelal
1995	"Jaise Jaise Dil Guzrega"	Zulm Ka Jawab	Bappi Lahiri
1996	"Dheere Dheere"	Angaara	Dilip Sen-Sameer Sen
1996	"Koi Mangta Dil"	Durjan	Sapan-Jagmohan
1996	"Deewana Pan Hain Yeh"	Maahir	Bappi Lahiri
1996	"Pyar Mein Kabhi Kabhi"	Tera Naam Mera Naam	Kuldeep Singh
1997	"Maine Tujhe Chaaha"	Daadagiri	Dilip Sen-Sameer Sen
1997	"Tin Tina Tin", "Tapka Re Tapka 2"	Mahaanta	Laxmikant–Pyarelal
1998	"Maine Dil Ka Hukum Sun Liya", "Teri Haan Ka Teri Na Ka", "Wada Karke Sajan Nahi Aaya"	Barsaat Ki Raat	Laxmikant–Pyarelal
1998	"Yehi to Pyar Hai"	Do Hazar Ek	Anand Raj Anand
1998	"Jammu Ki Jawani Kashmir Ki"	Hind Ki Beti	Sonik Omi
1998	"Haseenayein Zulfon Ka Phanda Bichayein"	Main Phir Aaongi	Sameer Shyam
1998	"Aaj Kisi Ki Jeet Hui Hai"	Mard	Dilip Sen-Sameer Sen
1999	"Chamak Challo Tu Naach"	Tune Mera Dil le Liyaa (Pinjra)	Mahesh-Kishore
2000	"Durga Hai Meri Maa"	Mela	Anu Malik
2001	"Dhol Bajhe"	Mitti	Ali-Ghani
