= Ashok Lav =

Hindi author and poet

Ashok Lav (born 13 April 1947) is a Hindi author and poet. Lav is the President of the Sarv Bhasha Trust, and the Delhi chapter of the International Hindi Association. He patrons the Age Well Association, and Rashtra Srijan Abhiyan, as well as being the chairman of the Spirituality Forum for Humanity; a spiritual humanitarian leadership group.

Lav has written over 160 academic and literary books, his latest being Nandita Abhinav(Novel-2025),'Ekantvas mein Zindagi' (Laghukatha Sangrah). His academic works are well received, with university students doing PhD and MPhil work surrounding his books -- Shikron Se Aage ( Novel ) and Ladkiyaan Chhoona Chahti Hain Aasmaan (a collection of poems). Lav has also edited some of his books, along with translating other non-self publications. - Nandita Abhinav (Upnyas) published in 2025 was released on 20th July 2025

== Works and honours ==
A recipient of numerous awards related to Hindi literature, including the Lifetime Achievement Award by Sarv Bhasha Trust on 20th July 2025, Life Time Achievement Award by General Mohyal Sabha and Sahitya Sabha Kaithal, Manav Seva Samman, and Eklavya award, his more well known works include:

- Shikhron Se Aage (novel- literally, "Beyond peaks")
- Anubhootiyon Kee Aahaten (collection of poems, literally, "The approaching footsteps of sensations")
- LarhkiyaAn Choonaa ChaAhtee Hain Aasmaan (collections of poems- literally, "Girls want to touch the sky")
- Phulvaree (songs for children- literally, "A garden of flowers")
- Band Darvaazon Par Dastaken (short stories- literally, "Knocking on locked doors")
- Salaam Dilli (short stories- literally, "A salute to Delhi")
- Pathron Se Bandhe Pankh (short stories- literally, "Feathers tied to stones")
- Khidkiyon Par Tange Log (short stories(ed)-literally,"People Looking from Windows"
- Papa ji kee Rail
- Icecream Ke Badal
- Barse Badal Jhama Jham
- Valmiki Ramayan *Mahabharata *Budhcharit Education.

His book Hindi ke Pratinidhi Saahityakaaron Se Saakshaatkaar, a collection of interviews with writers representative of Hindi literature, was released by the Vice President of India, Dr. Shankar Dayal Sharma on 9 February 1990.

He has been honored with the Life Time Achievement Awards by GMS and BBMI, as well as Vidya Sagar, Vidyavachspati, Kabir Samman, Bhartendu Harishchandra Samman, Mohyal Gaurav and more. About 70 organizations thus far have commended him for his contributions in literary, social and educational fields.
