= Phandebaaz =

- Film Poster
- Directed by: Samir Ganguly
- Written by: Kaushal Bharati
- Produced by: Surjit Aujla
- Starring: Dharmendra; Moushumi Chatterjee; Prem Chopra
- Narrated by: Kaushal Bharati
- Cinematography: N.V Srinivass
- Edited by: V.K Naik
- Music by: R. D. Burman
- Release date: 7 July 1978
- Running time: 2 hours 30 min
- Country: India
- Language: Hindi

Phandebaaz (Note: Phanda in Hindi is equivalent to a lasso; Baaz is Hindi slang for an expert; thus phandebaaz refers to "an expert in throwing a lasso (entrapping someone)". By implication, a phandebaaz is a trickster, someone similar to a chaalbaaz, who is an expert in "tricking" people. There are at least three movies with the latter name also) is a 1978 Bollywood action comedy romantic film directed by Samir Ganguly, and starring Dharmendra, Moushumi Chatterjee and Prem Chopra. Originally, Leena Chandavarkar was to play the female lead but she was unable to attend the shooting and was replaced by Moushumi Chatterjee. Hema Malini had a guest appearance in one song.

In the film, a poor man impersonates his wealthy lookalike and marries a rich girl, against her father's wishes. He later faces his father-in-law's revenge scheme.

== Plot ==
Rajkumar Kakkar, a poor young man, visits a city and meets a lookalike rich man, Rana Shantidas, and impersonates him. He falls in love with a rich girl, Shanti, and discloses his true identity to her. Her father, Diwan Bunny, refuses to accept him, but Rajkumar and Shanti marry anyway.

Rana is blackmailed by Diwan, and he and Rajkumar gate swap and exchange places, but Rajkumar finds himself the target of a bloody plot, and will have to struggle to defeat Diwan.

== Cast ==
- Dharmendra as Rajkumar Kakkar/Rana Shantidas (double role)
- Moushumi Chatterjee as Shanti: Rajkumar's wife
- Prem Chopra as Diwan Bunny
- Ranjeet as Jaggi Dada
- Bindu as Tony
- Satyendra Kapoor as Hukumat Rai: Shanti's father
- Jagdish Raj as Police Inspector
- Kumari Naaz as Princess Ratna
- Krishnakant as Bawji: Restaurant owner
- Helen as Club Dancer
- Bhagwan as Film Director
- Tun Tun as Rosie
- Brahmachari as Mohan
- Mac Mohan as Mac
- Hema Malini as Herself (guest appearance in song)

== Songs ==
Music's were given by R. D. Burman and recorded by Rajkamal Kamalmandir. The lyricist was Anand Bakshi. Audiography was done by Mohinder Singh. Some of the music had scored well.

#	Title	Singer(s)
1	"Abhi Gyarah Nahi Baje	Kishore Kumar
2	"Tera Dimag Aur Mera Shabab"	Asha Bhosle
3	"Duniya Me Paise Bina Kaise Ham Jiyenge"	Lata Mangeshkar, Mohammed Rafi
4	"Bade Bade Logo Ke Yaar Bade Bade Hai Raaz"	Amit Kumar, Mohammed Rafi
5	"Mohabbat Me Aji Kya Aap Apna Imtihaan Lenge"	Lata Mangeshkar, Mohammed Rafi
