= Raftaar (disambiguation) =

Raftaar (lit. 'speed') may refer to:

- Raftaar (rapper), Indian rapper
- Raftaar (1975 film), 1975 Indian Hindi-language film
- Raftaar Singh, titular character of the 2015 Indian film Singh is Bling, portrayed by Akshay Kumar
