= Ladaaku =

- Directed by: Dinesh Ramanesh
- Produced by: K. K. Jain; Kanti Kanakia
- Starring: Amjad Khan; Sarika; Raj Kiran; Jagdeep; Ranjeet
- Music by: Usha Khanna
- Release date: 1981
- Country: India
- Language: Hindi

Ladaaku is a 1981 Indian drama film directed by Dinesh Ramanesh.

== Cast ==
- Amjad Khan
- Sarika
- Raj Kiran
- Jagdeep
- Aruna Irani
- Ranjeet

== Soundtrack ==
The music of the film was composed by Usha Khanna, while lyrics were written by Indeevar, Asad Bhopali, Vitthalbhai Patel, Kulwant Jani.

1. "Noorie O Noorie" - Kishore Kumar
