= Maha-Sangram =

- Promotional Poster
- Directed by: Mukul Anand
- Produced by: Nitin Manmohan
- Starring: Vinod Khanna; Govinda; Aditya Pancholi; Madhuri Dixit; Shaheen; Sonu Walia; Amjad Khan
- Music by: Anand–Milind
- Distributed by: Neha Arts Pvt.Ltd
- Release date: 12 January 1990
- Running time: 149 minutes
- Country: India
- Language: Hindi

Maha-Sangram (also known in the UK as The Big Battle) is a 1990 Indian Hindi-language action drama film, directed by Mukul Anand. The film features an ensemble cast of Vinod Khanna, Govinda, Aditya Pancholi, Madhuri Dixit, Shaheen, Sumit Sehgal, Sonu Walia, and Amjad Khan.

== Plot ==
Uttar Pradesh-based Vishal gets a telegram from Santa Cruz Police Station that his younger collegian brother, Arjun, is dead. Distraught he travels to Bombay, collects his brothers ashes, and finds out that Arjun met a violent death. With the aid of a street-smart con-woman and her mentor, Babu Kasai Hyderabadi, he then sets out to find who killed his brother - not knowing that soon he will be drawn into the dark world of Godha and Vishwaraj.

== Cast ==
- Vinod Khanna as Vishal
- Madhuri Dixit as Jhumri
- Aditya Pancholi as Suraj
- Govinda as Arjun
- Sumeet Saigal as Prakash
- Sonu Walia as Neelam
- Shaheen as Pooja
- Amjad Khan as Bada Godha
- Gulshan Grover as Police Officer Virendra Pratap Singh
- Shakti Kapoor as Babu Kasai
- Kiran Kumar as Vishwa
- Pradeep Rawat as Pakya
- Shammi as Mary

== Track list ==
The soundtrack was composed by Anand Milind. The item number "Dhak Dhak Dil Dhadke" features vocals by Alisha Chinai with a few lines rendered by Aditya Pancholi, who has acted in the movie. Lyrics were penned by Sameer

Song	Singer
"I Love You" (female)	Alka Yagnik
"I Love You" (happy)	Alka Yagnik, Mohammed Aziz, Udit Narayan, Jolly Mukherjee, Anand
"I Love You" (sad)	Mohammad Aziz, Alka Yagnik
"Do Dooni Chaar"	Amit Kumar, Anuradha Paudwal
"Aa Bahon Mein Aa"	Amit Kumar, Anuradha Paudwal
"Chhodke Tujhko" (happy)	Mohammad Aziz, Suresh Wadkar
"Chhodke Tujhko" (sad)	Mohammad Aziz, Suresh Wadkar
"Aaya Main Aaya"	Udit Narayan, Amit Kumar
"Dhak Dhak Dil Dhadke"	Alisha Chinai
