= Aag Ke Sholay =

1988 Hindi film

- Directed by: S. R. Pratap
- Written by: Khalid
- Produced by: Gautam Bhatia
- Starring: Hemant Birje, Gulshan Grover, Vijeta Pandit, Sumeet Saigal
- Music by: Vijay
- Distributed by: Kirti Associate
- Release date: 14 October 1988
- Running time: 138 minutes
- Country: India
- Language: Hindi

Aag Ke Sholay (English translation – Flames of Fire) is 1988 Hindi language action movie directed by S. R. Pratap, starring Hemant Birje, Gulshan Grover, Vijeta Pandit, Sumeet Saigal, Sripada and Rashmi Inder.

== Plot ==
A landlord murders a school teacher in his village because he protests against his crimes. A man returns to take revenge for it and kills all the dacoits and the landlord.

== Cast ==
- Hemant Birje as Shankar
- Gulshan Grover as Daku Bagh Singh
- Vijeta Pandit as Ganga
- Sumeet Saigal as Thakur Amar Singh
- Bharat Kapoor as Gopal
- Yunus Parvez as Saxena
- Sunil Dhawan as Insp Vinod Agarwal
- Sripada as Geeta
- Rashmi Inder as Anuja

== Music ==
Lyrics: Khalid

1. "Baharo Me Dhumtara Nazaro Me Dhumtara" – Anuradha Paudwal, Amit Kumar
2. "Balam Batiyao Na" – Shabbir Kumar, Alka Yagnik, Amit Kumar
3. "Bas Me Nahi Hai Jawani Meri Baat Samajho Bairo" – Alka Yagnik
4. "Bigdi Huyee Banado Sarkaar-e-madina" – Mohammed Aziz
5. "Kal Talak Janta Pe Atyachar Jo Karte" – Amit Kumar, Alka Yagnik, Shabbir Kumar
6. "Kandhe Se Milake Kandha Kare Bhlayi Ka Dhandha" – Anuradha Paudwal, Alka Yagnik
7. "Mai Ka Karoon Bhagwan Mera" – Vijayta Pandit
