= Lashkar (film) =

- Poster
- Directed by: Jagdish Kadar
- Written by: Anwar Khan; Jagdish Kadar
- Produced by: Jai Sharma
- Starring: Dev Anand; Aditya Pancholi; Sonam; Javed Jaffrey; Kiran Kumar; Hemant Birje; Sumeet Saigal
- Cinematography: Joe D'Souza
- Edited by: Hussain A. Burmawala
- Music by: Nadeem Shravan
- Production company: Tanushree Films
- Release date: 1 September 1989
- Country: India
- Language: Hindi

Lashkar (Army) is a 1989 Bollywood action film directed by Jagdish Kadar, starring Dev Anand, Aditya Pancholi, Sonam, Madhavi, Hemant Birje, Sumeet Saigal, Jaaved Jaffrey, Kiran Kumar and Sadashiv Amrapurkar. The movie was a huge commission earner at the box office and is believed to be one of the last commercial successes of Dev Anand. This was the only film in the late 1980s that Dev Anand starred in that he did not produce or direct, but acted in the lead role and the film was a major box office success.

== Cast ==
- Dev Anand
- Aditya Pancholi
- Sonam
- Madhavi
- Javed Jaffrey
- Hemant Birje
- Sumeet Saigal
- Kiran Kumar

== Soundtrack ==
#	Title	Singer
1	"Ek Haath Mein Rumaal"	Mohammed Aziz, Vinod Rathod, Manhar Udhas
2	"Har Mehfil Mein"	Vinod Rathod
3	"Piye Jaa, Pilaye Jaa"	Alisha Chinai
4	"Swarg Se Pyara Hai"	Kavita Krishnamurthy, Mohammed Aziz
5	"Swarg Se Pyara Hai" (sad)	Mohammed Aziz
