= Raftaar (film) =

- DVD Cover
- Directed by: Dinesh-Ramanesh; Ramesh Puri
- Written by: Rajvansh
- Produced by: S. I. Shivdasani
- Starring: Vinod Mehra; Moushumi Chatterjee; Danny Denzongpa; Ranjeet; Madan Puri
- Cinematography: Chaman Kadalbaju
- Edited by: Govind Dalwadi
- Music by: Sonik Omi
- Production company: Chitrashala
- Release date: 1975
- Country: India
- Language: Hindi

Raftaar (Speed) is a 1975 Bollywood action drama film directed by Dinesh-Ramanesh and produced by S. I. Shivdasani. The music was composed by the music directing duo Sonik Omi. The story writer was Rajvansh, while screenplay and dialogues were by K. B. Pathak. The lyricists were Verma Malik, Omkar Verma and Abhilash. Vinod Mehra was cast in the main role as Vikram. Mehra had started his career in Roop K. Shorey's Ek Thi Reeta (1971) and became an established star following Anuraag (1973); Raftaar was noted as one of his prominent films in the 1970s. The cast included Moushumi Chatterjee, Danny Denzongpa, Madan Puri, Ranjeet, Arpana Chowdhary and Jankidas.

Raftaar was a romantic action thriller film. It involves a young city man sent to a village to work. He falls in love with a village girl who dies, but mysteriously reappears in his life under another identity.

The film was given a three-star rating, with its music by Sonik Omi cited as "good".

== Plot ==
Rani is a village girl living with her ever-grumbling step-mother and father. At the start of the film, she is shown playing kabaddi with other girls. They trouble the village simpleton Banelal and are reprimanded by his father. While trying to get water from the village well, Rani slips and falls inside. Vikram, who works for Pramod Kumar as a manager is sent to the village to get some job done. He stops to fill water in his car, which has heated up and helps Rani by pulling her out of the well. Vikram falls in love with her and promises to marry her when he saves her from committing suicide to avoid an arranged marriage.

Kumar arrives at the village and demands that his housekeeper to get Rani for him. He sends Vikram to the city on some pretext and rapes Rani. Rani is seen jumping into the river by the housekeeper. However, she is saved by a kind-hearted Christian gentleman Jackson, who has lost his daughter, Rita, several years ago.

Vikram gets implicated in some wrongdoing and is sent to prison for a year. On his return, he finds Kumar attempting to rape another girl and gets hurt in the fight. He is found unconscious by some gypsies who care for him. He then helps a young woman, Radha and her child, in search of her husband, and shifts to the city. Kumar spots Rani who is now pretending to be Rita and discovers her identity when he hears her sing at a function.

Rita/Rani is after revenge and pretends to be friendly with Kumar. Following some fight scenes and melodramatic moments, Kumar repents when he finds he has a son, and goes to jail. Vikram and Rani get together.

== Cast ==
- Vinod Mehra as Vikram
- Moushumi Chatterjee as Rani / Rita
- Danny Denzongpa as Pramod Kumar
- Ranjeet as Chandu Banjara
- Madan Puri as Jackson (Rita's Father)
- Sunder as Bankelal's Father
- Mohan Choti as Sakharam
- Birbal as Bankelal
- Jankidas as Rani's Father
- Lalita Kumari as Rani's Step-mother
- Arpana Choudhary as Radha (Pramod's Wife)

== Soundtrack ==
The music composers were Sonik Omi. The songs were written by three lyricists, Verma Malik, Omkar Verma and Abhilash, with playback singing provided by Asha Bhosle, Mohammed Rafi and Mukesh. The film had one of the rare duets by Mukesh and Asha Bhosle "Sansar Hai Ek Nadiya", picturised on Madan Puri and Moushumi Chatterjee.

=== Song list ===
Song	Singer	Raga
"Yeh Kaisi Lagi Agan"	Asha Bhosle	
"Naari Jeevan Bhi Kya"	Asha Bhosle	
"Loota Hai Tune Mujhe"	Asha Bhosle	
"Sansar Hai Ek Nadiya"	Mukesh, Asha Bhosle	Shivaranjani
"Main Teri Heer Hoon, Teri Taqdeer Hoon"	Mohammed Rafi, Asha Bhosle	
