= Ghar Parivar =

- Directed by: Mohanji Prasad
- Written by: S. M. Abbas
- Produced by: B. K. Parivar
- Starring: Rajesh Khanna; Rishi Kapoor; Moushumi Chatterjee; Meenakshi Seshadri
- Music by: Kalyanji Anandji
- Release date: 1 January 1991 (India)
- Country: India
- Language: Hindi

Ghar Parivar is a 1991 Indian Hindi-language film directed by Mohanji Prasad and produced by B. K. Parivar. It stars Rajesh Khanna, Rishi Kapoor, Moushumi Chatterjee and Meenakshi Seshadri. The film was 6th highest-grossing Indian film of 1991.

== Cast ==
Actor	Character	Others
Rajesh Khanna	Shankar	Elder Brother
Rishi Kapoor	Birju	Younger Brother
Meenakshi Sheshadri	Mala	Birju's Love interest
Moushumi Chatterjee	Parvati	Shankar's Wife
Raj Kiran	Balwant	Middle Brother
Shoma Anand	Bimla	Balwant's Wife
Dina Pathak	Lakshmi	Shankar, Balwant & Birju's Mother
Prem Chopra	Seth Bansilal Agarwal	Main Antagonist
Asrani	Seth's Man	
Shafi Inamdar	Police Inspector	
Huma Khan	Dancer	In "Aise Nachungi" song
Yunus Parvez	Seth	
Dinesh Hingoo	Villager	Guest Role
Bharat Bhushan	Sadhu	In song "Samay Bada Balwan"
Ashok Saraf	Ramu Bhaiya	Seth's Munshi

== Soundtrack ==
Lyrics: Anjaan

#	Title	Singer(s)
1	"Beech Bajariya Ladi Najariya"	Kumar Sanu
2	"Samay Bada Balwan Hai"	Nitin Mukesh
3	"Kurte Ka Kya Hai"	Amit Kumar, Sadhana Sargam, Sonali Bajpayee
4	"Road Romeo"	Kumar Sanu, Satyanarayan Rao
5	"Nazar Jo Hamse Churayega"	Alka Yagnik
6	"Rooth Raswanti"	Sadhana Sargam
7	"Aise Nachungi"	Alka Yagnik
8	"Hum Garibon Ko Agar"	Udit Narayan, Alka Yagnik
