= Saajan Ki Baahon Mein =

- Directed by: Jay Prakash
- Written by: Rumi Jaffery
- Screenplay by: Sachin Bhowmick
- Story by: Jay Prakash
- Produced by: Dinesh B. Patel
- Starring: Rishi Kapoor; Raveena Tandon; Tabu; Prem Chopra; Pran; Laxmikant Berde
- Cinematography: Kabir Lal
- Edited by: Jawahar Razdan
- Music by: Nadeem-Shravan
- Release date: 28 July 1995
- Running time: 145 minute
- Country: India
- Language: Hindi

Saajan Ki Baahon Mein (translation: In the Arms of Beloved) is a 1995 Indian Hindi-language romantic drama film directed by Jay Prakash and produced by Dinesh B. Patel. It stars Rishi Kapoor, Raveena Tandon, Tabu in pivotal roles.

== Plot ==
Sagar (Rishi Kapoor) is a bachelor well-known singer, wherever he performs, he is majorly surrounded by many female-followers. One of these followers, Sapna (Raveena Tandon), with whom he meets in Srinagar & after some misunderstandings, both of them fall in love with each other. Now, they have decided to get married, without knowing that Sapna's father Narang (Pran) has another plan to marry Sapna with Rakesh (Sumeet Saigal), the only son of Ranveer Singh (Saeed Jaffrey) & also the childhood friend of Sagar. As a result, Sagar & Sapna become separate from each other. After some months they meet again, but here Sapna has to make an engagement with Rakesh, while Sagar announces his marriage to Kavita (Tabu). Now, what will happen to the love story of Sagar & Sapna forms the climax.

== Cast ==
- Rishi Kapoor as Sagar
- Raveena Tandon as Sapna
- Tabu as Kavita
- Sumeet Saigal as Rakesh Singh
- Prem Chopra as Pyarelal
- Saeed Jaffrey as Ranveer Singh
- Deven Verma as Dr. Rastogi
- Pran as Narang
- Laxmikant Berde as Anand
- Navneet Nishan as Anjali
- Dinesh Hingoo as Tanha Bhopali
- Birbal as Hawaldar

== Soundtrack ==
The soundtrack was composed by Nadeem-Shravan, with lyrics penned by Sameer. The album was released on 2 September 1994 under Venus Records & Tapes. The music of this movie was huge hit, especially track like "Kitna Sukun Kitna Aaram", "Aap Ke Karib", "Koi Kya Pahechane" & "Sachi Kaho. Kumar Sanu sang all the songs for Rishi Kapoor.

#	Song	Singer
1.	"Kitna Sukun Kitna Aaram"	Kumar Sanu
2.	"Aap Ke Karib"	Kumar Sanu, Sadhana Sargam
3.	"Koi Kya Pehchane"	Kumar Sanu
4.	"Sachi Kaho"	Kumar Sanu, Sadhana Sargam
5.	"Sachi Kaho" (Sad)	Kumar Sanu
6.	"Purab Se Chali"	Kumar Sanu, Asha Bhosle
7.	"Pilaya Hai"	Kumar Sanu
