= Apne Begaane =

- Directed by: Madhu Tejpal
- Produced by: Sanjiv Bhandi
- Starring: Sumeet Saigal; Anuradha Patel
- Music by: Prem Gupta
- Release date: February 1989
- Country: India
- Language: Hindi

Apne Begaane is a 1989 Bollywood film directed by Madhu Tejpal and starring Sumeet Saigal, Anuradha Patel, A K Hangal, Shashi Puri and Anant Mahadevan.

== Cast ==
- Sumeet Saigal as Prakash Nanda
- Anuradha Patel as Bandini
- Shashi Puri as Sudhir
- Anant Mahadevan as Vikrant Malhotra
- Nandita Thakur as Shanti
- Bharti Achrekar as Vimla
- Bharat Bhushan as Dwarka
- A.K. Hangal as Hassan Khan
- Shreeram Lagoo as SK Nanda

== Music ==
The film's music has been composed by Prem Gupta and penned by Rajesh Johri.

- "Anjaanon Ki Basti Mein" – Manna Dey
- "Jaadugar Aaye Hain" – Manna Dey, Mahendra Kapoor
- "Jab Baategi Yeh Jagir" – Preeti Sagar, Jaspal Singh, Vinod Sehgal, Meenakshi
- "Saari Duniya Ka Jo Maseeha Hai" – Jagjit Singh
- "Dushman Ho Gayi Meri Jawani" – Asha Bhosle, Suresh Wadkar
- "Jabse Piya Laage Tose More Nainwa" – Asha Bhosle
