= Kaagaz Ki Nao =

- Directed by: B. R. Ishara
- Music by: Sapan–Jagmohan; Naqsh Lyallpuri (lyrics)
- Release date: 1975
- Country: India
- Language: Hindi

Kaagaz Ki Nao is a 1975 Bollywood film directed by B. R. Ishara.

== Cast ==
- Raj Kiran as Raj
- Pradeep Kumar as Kumar
- Sarika as Sarita
- Aruna Irani as Aruna
- Helen as Ratna

== Soundtrack ==
- "Na Jaiyo Re Sautan Ghar Saiyan" – Asha Bhosle
- "Har Janam Me Hamara Milan" – Manhar Udhas, Asha Bhosle
- "Aaj Sakhi Mai Babul Ka Ghar" – Manna Dey
- "Main Tumhare Khayalon Mein" – Asha Bhosle
