= Awara Zindagi =

1989 film by Syed Ishrat Abbas

- Directed by: A. A. Darpan
- Starring: Kader Khan; Mazhar Khan; Kader Khan
- Music by: Jagdish J.
- Release date: 1989
- Country: India
- Language: Hindi

Awara Zindagi is a 1989 Hindi drama film, directed by A. A. Darpan, starring Raj Kiran, Prema Narayan, Sudhir and Kadar Khan in lead roles.

== Cast ==
- Raj Kiran as Tony
- Kader Khan as Boss
- Mazhar Khan as Ganpath Dada
- Mushtaq Khan as Fernandes
- Sudhir as Tiger
- Prema Narayan as Salu
- Gajendra Chauhan
- Dev Kumar as Sherra
- Saloni as Sita
- Nilesh Malhotra as Sony
- Mushtaq Merchant as Mony

== Music ==
Music Director: Jagdish J.

1. "Aaye Sawan Ki Rut" v1 – Anuradha Paudwal, Poornima
2. "Aaye Sawan Ki Rut" v2 – Anuradha Paudwal, Poornima
3. "Awara Zindagi" – Anwar
4. "Kahin Rut Badal Na Jaaye" v1 – Anwar
5. "Kahin Rut Badal Na Jaaye" v2 – Anwar
6. "Kisi Surat Bhi" v1 – Anwar
7. "Kisi Surat Bhi" v2 – Anwar
8. "Masti Mein" – Manna Dey
9. "Mehnat Na Banaye" – Anwar
