= Raagam =

- Directed by: A. Bhimsingh
- Written by: S. L. Puram Sadanandan
- Based on: Anuraag (1972) by Shakti Samanta
- Produced by: N. P. Ali
- Starring: Sharada; Lakshmi; Sukumari; Adoor Bhasi; Jose Prakash; Master Natraj
- Cinematography: Balu Mahendra
- Edited by: A. Paul Dorai Singham
- Music by: Salil Chowdhary
- Production company: Jammu Films
- Distributed by: Jammu Films
- Release date: 2 October 1975
- Country: India
- Language: Malayalam

Raagam (transl. Raga) is a 1975 Indian Malayalam-language drama film directed by A. Bhimsingh and produced by N. P. Ali. The film stars Sharada, Lakshmi, Sukumari, Adoor Bhasi, Jose Prakash and Master Natraj in the lead roles. The film has musical score by Salil Chowdhary. It was a remake of the Hindi film Anuraag.

== Synopsis ==
The film follows a well-to-do multigenerational family in Keralam as they traverse through life's challenges. Babu, a friendly and charming boy, lives an idyllic life with his widowed mother, an accomplished sculptress, and his paternal grandfather. He befriends a blind orphan named Sreedevi, who has a talent for sculpting and singing. Madhu, a close family friend, falls in love with her, despite the opposition of his wealthy father who disapproves of her background and disability. Tragedy befalls when Babu is diagnosed with terminal blood cancer. His last wish is followed, and his eyes are donated to Sreedevi.

== Cast ==
- Sharada as Priyamvada
- Sukumari as Gomati
- Adoor Bhasi as Vishwanatha Menon
- Jose Prakash as Dr. Jayachandran
- Lakshmi as Sreedevi
- Mohan Sharma as Madhusudanan
- Prema as School teacher
- Sankaradi as Dharmapalan
- Bahadoor as Gopalan
- Mallika Sukumaran as Blind school teacher
- T. P. Madhavan as Priest
- Kaviyoor Ponnamma as Blind school principal
- Master Nadarajan as Babu

== Soundtrack ==
The music was composed by Salil Chowdhary.

No.	Song	Singers	Lyrics	Length (m:ss)
1	"Aa Kayyilo"	K. J. Yesudas	Vayalar	
2	"Aa Kayyilo" (Movie Version)	K. J. Yesudas	Vayalar	
3	"Ambaadippoonkuyile"	P. Susheela	Vayalar	
4	"Guruvayoorappan"	K. J. Yesudas	Vayalar	
5	"Ivide Kaattinu Sugandham"	K. J. Yesudas, S. Janaki	Vayalar	
6	"Naadanpaattile Maina"	Vani Jayaram	Vayalar	
7	"Omana Thinkal Pakshi" (Pathos Bit)	P. Susheela	Vayalar	
8	"Omanathinkalppakshi"	P. Susheela	Vayalar	

== Awards ==
- Filmfare Award for Best Film - Malayalam won by N.P. Ali (1975)
