= Shikshaa =

- Directed by: S. Ramanathan
- Produced by: Rajshri Productions
- Cinematography: V Keshav
- Music by: Bappi Lahiri
- Distributed by: New Horizon Films
- Release date: 1979
- Country: India
- Language: Hindi

Shikshaa is a 1979 Hindi-language drama film directed by S. Ramanathan, starring Raj Kiran, Beena Banerjee and Iftekhar in lead roles. The film was a remake of Telugu film Neramu Siksha.

== Cast ==
- Raj Kiran as Vijay D. Gupta
- Sushma Verma as Madhu
- Beena Banerjee as Janaki
- Iftekhar as Rai Bahadur Dwarka Das Gupta
- Urmila Bhatt as Laxmi D. Gupta

== Soundtrack ==
The music was composed by Bappi Lahiri for lyrics by Gauhar Kanpuri.

1. "Teri Choti Si Ek Bhool" - K. J. Yesudas
2. "Main Diwani" - Aarthi Mukherjee
3. "Yari Hai Phoolon Se Meri" 1 - Bappi Lahiri
4. "Chhan Chhan Baj Rahe Ghunghroo" - Shailendra Singh, Anuradha Paudwal
5. "Jehi Vidhi Rakhe Ram" - Chandrani Mukherjee
6. "Yari Hai Phoolon Se Meri" 2 - Bappi Lahiri
