= Nishane Bazi =

Nishanebazi
- Directed by: V N Menon
- Produced by: Mohan T Gehani
- Starring: Sumeet Saigal; Sripradha
- Music by: Ravindra Jain
- Release date: 13 April 1989
- Country: India
- Language: Hindi

Nishanebazi is a 1989 Bollywood action film directed by V N Menon and starring Sumeet Saigal, Shakti Kapoor, Kader Khan and Anupam Kher. The movie was released on 13 April 1989.

== Cast ==
- Sumeet Saigal as Prakash Singh
- Shakti Kapoor as Havaldar Kamlesh
- Anupam Kher as Fauji Vijay Singh
- Kader Khan as Inspector Aslam Khan
- Sripradha as Alka

== Soundtrack ==
Tumhein Mera Salaam is most loved song of this film.

Song	Singer
"Tumhe Mera Salaam"	Mohammed Aziz
"Dikhayenge Ab Khel"	Kavita Krishnamurthy
"Kar Doon Main Tujhko"	Kavita Krishnamurthy
"Main Chor Tu Meri Humjoli"	Kavita Krishnamurthy, Suresh Wadkar
"Hum to Banjare Hain"	Anuradha Paudwal, Suresh Wadkar
