= Divya Rana =

Indian actress

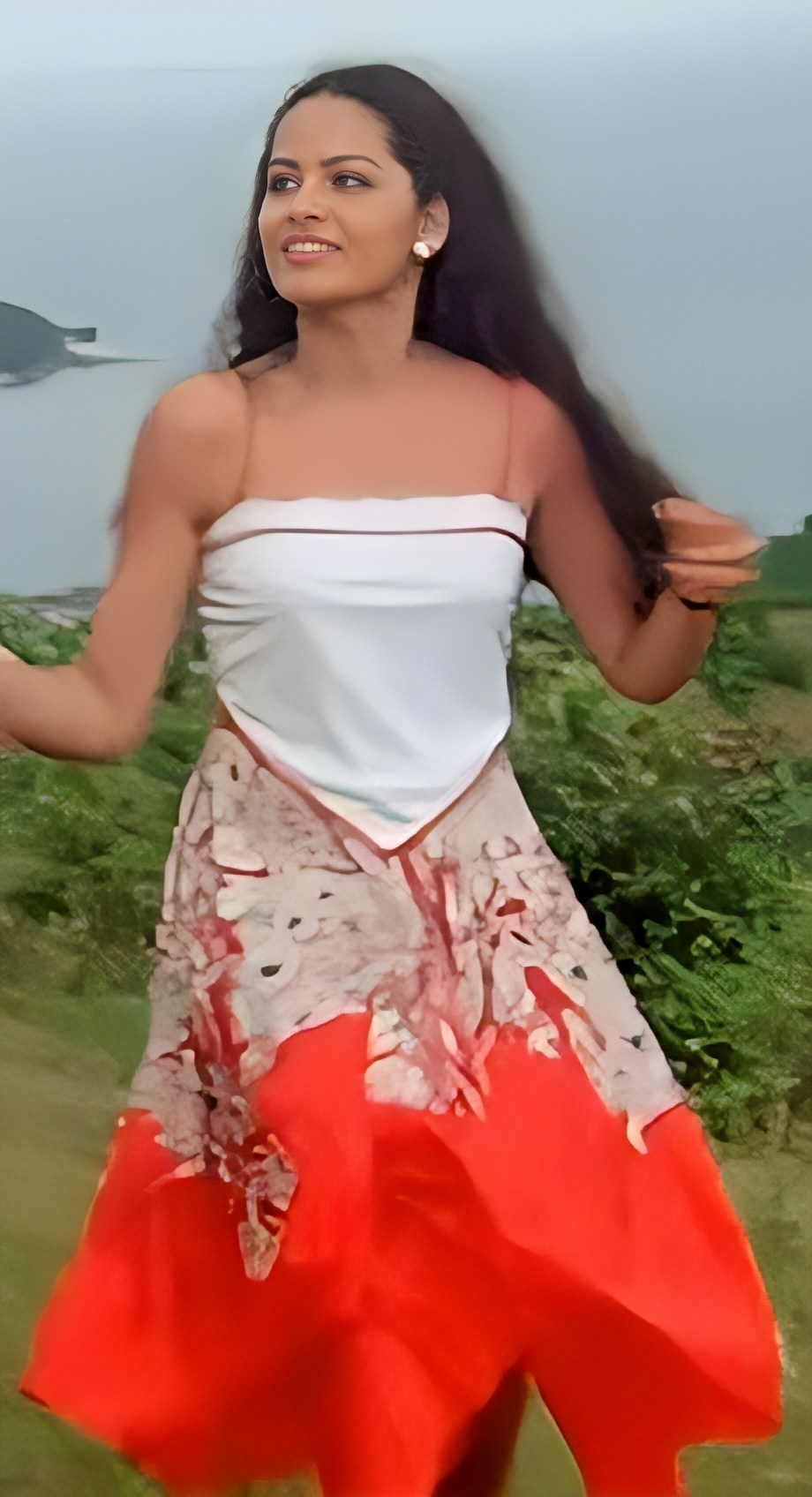
- Divya Rana in Ek Jaan Hain Hum (1983)
- Born: 24 February 1966 (age 60); Mumbai, India
- Other name: Salma Manekia
- Occupation: Actress
- Years active: 1983–1991
- Notable work: Ek Jaan Hain Hum, Ram Teri Ganga Maili, Maa Kasam
- Spouse: Fazal
- Children: 2

Divya Rana is a former Bollywood actress most noted for her role in Raj Kapoor's Ram Teri Ganga Maili. Divya began her career with the film Ek Jaan Hain Hum (1983) opposite Raj Kapoor's youngest son Rajiv Kapoor. Then she was selected as the second lead in Raj Kapoor's Ram Teri Ganga Maili (1985) co-starring Rajiv Kapoor & Mandakini. Divya later acted in films like Watan Ke Rakhwale, Ek Hi Maqsad, Aasmaan (1984), Maa Kasam (1985 film), Param Dharam and many others. She quit her acting career after her marriage and lives in Mumbai with her husband Fazal and goes by the name Salma Manekia. She works as a photographer and makes ceramic sculptures.

== Selected filmography ==
Year	Title	Role
1983	Ek Jaan Hain Hum	Seema
1984	Aasmaan	Reshma
1985	Ram Teri Ganga Maili	Radha B Choudhury
1985	Maa Kasam	Santho
1987	Woh Din Aayega	Suman
1987	Watan Ke Rakhwale	Vimla (Vimli)
1987	Param Dharam	Munnibai
1987	Himmat Aur Mehanat	Sona
1988	Aakhri Muqabla	Roopa
1988	Andha Yudh	Nurse Madhuri
1988	Ek Hi Maqsad	Indu, Dimpy R Verma
1989	Garibon Ka Daata	Tulsi
