= Pati Patni Aur Tawaif =

Pati Patni Aurn Tawaif
- DVD cover
- Directed by: Rajkumar Kohli
- Produced by: Rajkumar Kohli
- Starring: Mithun Chakraborty; Salma Agha; Farha Naaz; Sumeet Saigal; Om Prakash
- Music by: Laxmikant–Pyarelal
- Release date: 18 May 1990
- Running time: 135 minutes
- Country: India
- Language: Hindi

Pati Patni Aur Tawaif (transl. Husband, Wife and prostitute) is a 1990 Indian Hindi-language film directed by Rajkumar Kohli, starring Mithun Chakraborty, Salma Agha, Farha Naaz and Om Prakash. It is a remake of Pakistan's 1988 Urdu language movie Bazar-e-Husn. Salma Agha reprised her role from Bazar-e-Husn in Pati Patni Aur Tawaif.

== Plot ==
Vijay Saxena, a well-known actor-director, lives with his wife, Shanti, and a child. When his movie actress walks out of his movie, Vijay is introduced to a prostitute named Gauri. Problems arise when Vijay ends up in a relationship with Gauri.

== Soundtrack ==
Laxmikant–Pyarelal was the music director of the movie and composed tunes for the songs. All lyrics were written by Anand Bakshi except for Mujhe Log Kehte Hain Kadmon Ki Dhool was co-written with Pyarelal Shrivasta.

Songs
No.	Title	Playback	Length
1.	"Ek Doosre Se Khafa Hona Nahin"	Mohammed Aziz, Kavita Krishnamurthy	4:39
2.	"Teri Mohabbat Meri Jawani"	Mohammed Aziz, Salma Agha	6:17
3.	"Mere Chann Pardesi"	Reshma	5:59
4.	"Kehna Na Tum Yeh Kisi Se"	Mohammed Aziz, Salma Agha	6:05
5.	"Mujhe Log Kehte Hai Kadmon Ki Dhool"	Salma Agha	5:57
6.	"Ek Doosre Se Khafa Hona Nahin (Sad)"	Mohammed Aziz, Kavita Krishnamurthy	3:03

== Cast ==
- Mithun Chakraborty as Vijay Saxena
- Salma Agha as Gauri
- Farha Naaz as Mrs. Shanti Saxena
- Anita Raj as Kiran
- Sumeet Saigal as Prince Kumar
- Sonika Gill as Chandni
- Gulshan Grover as Advocate
- Aruna Irani as Chhaiya
- Jagdeep as Ustad
- Amjad Khan as Sulaiman Dildar
- Roopesh Kumar as Gauri's Uncle (Mama)
- Om Prakash as Tarachand
