= Tamacha =

- Theatrical release poster
- Directed by: Ramesh Ahuja
- Written by: Madan Joshi (dialogues)
- Screenplay by: K. B. Pathak
- Story by: Ramesh Ahuja
- Produced by: Prasan Kapoor
- Starring: Jeetendra; Rajinikanth; Amrita Singh; Bhanupriya
- Cinematography: Anil Mitra
- Edited by: Nand Kumar
- Music by: Bappi Lahiri
- Production company: Tirupati Pictures Enterprises
- Release date: 26 February 1988
- Running time: 165 minutes
- Country: India
- Language: Hindi

Tamacha (transl. Smack) is a 1988 Hindi-language action film, produced by Prasan Kapoor under the Tirupati Pictures Enterprises banner and directed by Ramesh Ahuja. It stars Jeetendra, Rajinikanth, Amrita Singh, Bhanupriya in the pivotal roles and music was composed by Bappi Lahiri. The film was dubbed in Tamil as Ezhai Thozhan and also dubbed in Telugu as Praja Nayakudu.

== Cast ==
- Jeetendra as CBI Inspector Rajeev Singh "Raju", Pratap's son
- Rajinikanth as Vikram Pratap Singh "Vicky", Jwala Pratap's elder son
- Amrita Singh as Maria
- Bhanupriya as Seema
- Kimi Katkar as Dolly
- Sumeet Saigal as Gautam Pratap Singh, Vikram's younger brother
- Anupam Kher as Dr. Mehta
- Asrani as Constable Bhandari
- Iftekhar as Senior Police Officer Gupta
- Satyendra Kapoor as D.P. Saxena / Johny (Double Role)
- Shreeram Lagoo as Chandra Pratap Singh
- Rohini Hattangadi as Laxmi Singh
- Nilu Phule as Jwala Pratap Singh
- Sulabha Deshpande as Shanti Singh
- Murad as Rai Bahadur Pratap Singh
- Sudhir Dalvi as Mohan
- Vikas Anand as Vikas
- Aruna Irani as Sarita
- Beena Banerjee as Asha, Mohan's Wife

== Soundtrack ==
Lyrics: Anand Bakshi

Song	Singer
"Sara Din Bas Duty Duty"	Asha Bhosle
"Dilbar Dilbar, O Dilbar Jani, Kehti Hai Rut Yeh Suhani, Sunle Zara Duniya Hai Kya"	Asha Bhosle, Mohammed Aziz, Shailendra Singh
"Jaago Mere Naag Devta, Mere Man Mein Bujhe Aag"	Mohammed Aziz, Kavita Krishnamurthy
"Lag Ja Gale, Lagke Gale Sab Gile Tu Mita De"	Mohammed Aziz, S. Janaki
"Dil Se Dil Mila, Phir Kaisa Gila, Ho Gaya Pyar"	Pankaj Udhas, Sharon Prabhakar
