= Apna Desh Paraye Log =

- Directed by: Pradeep Hooda
- Produced by: Parul Chawla
- Starring: Sumeet Saigal; Suresh Oberoi
- Music by: Usha Khanna
- Release date: 10 November 1989
- Country: India
- Language: Hindi

Apna Desh Paraye Log is a 1989 Bollywood film directed by Pradeep Hooda and starring Sumeet Saigal, Sonu Walia, Moon Moon Sen, Suresh Oberoi, Om Shivpuri and Sadashiv Amrapurkar.

== Cast ==
- Sumeet Saigal as Abhimanyu
- Sonu Walia as Geeta
- Moon Moon Sen as Shaarda Kumar
- Suresh Oberoi as Dinesh Kumar
- Jamuna as Abhi's Mother
- Sadashiv Amrapurkar as Ranganathan
- Ishrat Ali as Neta Banarsi Das
- Bharat Kapoor as Inspector Anil Sharma
- Om Shivpuri as Seth Ramji Das
- Mangal Dhillon as Advocate Sharma
- Dan Dhanoa as Ranga
- Tina Ghai as Journalist Sunita
- Sudhir Dalvi as Sunita's Father
- Atlee Brar as Khairu

== Soundtrack ==
#	Title	Singer(s)
1	"Mishri Ki Dali Hai Roop Tera"	Udit Narayan, Anuradha Paudwal
2	"Ab Ke Baras"	Mohammed Aziz
3	"Apna Desh Paraye Log"	Mahendra Kapoor
4	"Apna Desh Paraye Log" v2	Mahendra Kapoor
5	"Apna Desh Paraye Log" v3	Mahendra Kapoor
6	"Haseena Nachegi"	Sapna Mukherjee
7	"Sej Palkon Ki"	Alka Yagnik, Vinod Rathod
8	"Wahi Awaaz Wahi Lay"	Roop Kumar Rathod
