= Maa Kasam (1985 film) =

- Poster
- Directed by: Shibu Mitra
- Produced by: Veena Sharma; Vikas Sharma
- Starring: Mithun Chakraborty; Amjad Khan; Divya Rana; Ranjeet; Sharat Saxena; Pran; Guddi Maruti
- Music by: Bappi Lahiri
- Release date: 1985
- Running time: 130 minutes
- Language: Hindi

Maa Kasam is a 1985 Indian Hindi-language action drama film directed by Shibu Mitra, starring Mithun Chakraborty, Amjad Khan, Divya Rana, Ranjeet, Sharat Saxena and Pran in lead roles.

== Plot ==
Balwant returns home after completing his jail term. He discovers that the Thakur has a treasure map hidden in a diamond ring. He kills the Thakur, but fails to obtain the ring. He wanted to find the ring, but ends up killing his own wife. His dying wife takes her young son, Dharma, and requests the Thakurain to look after him as her own son. Balwant is again arrested and gets a long jail term. Now Dharma has grown as a hard-working and honest man under Thakurain's care. Now Chakradhari, a con man makes life miserable for the people. At the same time, Balwant completes his sentence and returns for the ring. Who possesses the ring forms the climax.

== Cast ==
- Mithun Chakraborty as Dharma
- Divya Rana as Santho
- Ranjeet as Balwant
- Pran as Inspector Kishanlal
- Amjad Khan as Chakradhari
- Sushma Seth as Thakurain
- Sharat Saxena as Makhan Singh
- Ram Mohan as Manager Kabir
- Manik Irani as Kalu
- Viju Khote as Constable B.A. Talwar
- Sunder as Bhola Ram, Tribal Leader
- Birbal as Lala
- Guddi Maruti as Bela , Bhola Ram's daughter
- Brahmachari as Dinu
- Harish Patel as Ibu
- Huma Khan as Dancer in yellow sari
- Punnu as Jaggu
- Kalpana Iyer as an item number
- Kim as an item number

== Soundtrack ==
- Record Label: Super T-Series
- Music: Bappi Lahiri
- Lyrics: Faroukh Qaiser and Anjaan

Songs:

- 1. "Jabse Tujhko Dekha Hai" – S. Janaki, Manhar Udhas
- 2. "Ek Do Teen Aare Aare" – Amit Kumar, Manhar Udhas
- 3. "Rajaji Raja Rajaji" – Uttara Kelkar
- 4. "Pesh Karta Hoon" – Shabbir Kumar, Shobha Gurtu
- 5. "Bingo Bingo Bingo Mein Hoon" – Mohammad Aziz, Parvati Khan, Vijay Benedict

== Awards ==
Won- Filmfare Best Comedian Award for Amjad Khan
