= Dost Garibon Ka =

- Promotional Poster
- Directed by: C. P. Dixit
- Screenplay by: M. M. Baig
- Story by: Jehan Nayyar
- Produced by: Firoza Nadiadwala
- Starring: Govinda; Neelam
- Cinematography: Anil Dhanda
- Edited by: Hussain A. Burmawala
- Music by: Laxmikant-Pyarelal
- Release date: 13 January 1989
- Country: India
- Language: Hindi

Dost Garibon Ka is a Hindi language movie produced by Firoza Nadiadwala starring Govinda and Neelam. The movie was directed by C. P. Dixit and was released in 1989.

== Cast ==
- Govinda as Vijay / Barkat Ali
- Neelam as Rekha
- Sumeet Saigal as Inspector Amar
- Satish Shah as Barkat Ali Khan / Bholeram
- Raza Murad as Thakur Ranjeet Singh
- Om Shivpuri as Dharamdas
- Vijay Arora as Dinanath
- Anjana Mumtaz as Laxmi
- Rajendra Nath as Restaurant Owner
- Dan Dhanoa as Dan

== Soundtrack ==
Movie featured five songs. Music by Laxmikant-Pyarelal and lyrics by Anand Bakshi.

Dost Garibon Ka

Soundtrack album by Laxmikant Pyarelal
- Released: 13 January 1989
- Genre: Feature film soundtrack

Song	Singer
"Ab Bol Kya Bolta Hai"	Kishore Kumar
"Daulat Hai Kya"	Amit Kumar
"Mera Naam Very Good"	Sudesh Bhosle
"Kafan Apna Kabhi"	Mohammed Aziz, Kavita Krishnamurthy
"Dekhne Ki Cheez Hoon Main"	Kavita Krishnamurthy
