= Ek Hi Maqsad =

- Directed by: Pravin Bhatt
- Screenplay by: Santosh Saroj; Praveen Bhatt
- Produced by: Raj Baweja; G H Navani
- Starring: Om Puri; Divya Rana; Danny Denzongpa
- Cinematography: Pravin Bhatt
- Edited by: B. Prasad
- Music by: Pankaj Udhas
- Production company: The Bharat Pictures
- Release date: 22 April 1988
- Country: India
- Language: Hindi

Ek Hi Maqsad (transl. Only one objective/purpose) is a 1988 Indian Hindi language Bollywood drama film directed by Pravin Bhatt. The music is composed by Pankaj Udhas. The screenplay is written by Santosh Saroj and Praveen Bhatt. The film stars Om Puri, Divya Rana and Danny Denzongpa in the lead roles. The movie also stars Raj Kiran, Rakesh Bedi and Satish Shah.

== Synopsis ==
Indu, a college student living who is with her father, catches the attention of Raj, a fellow student who gets deeply attracted to her. Despite his persistent pursuit, their relationship eventually blossoms into love. However, tragedy strikes when, during a motorbike ride, they are attacked by a group of thugs who attempt to assault Indu. Raj fights to protect her, but amidst the chaos, Indu falls off a cliff and is presumed dead.

Overwhelmed by grief, Raj suffers a mental breakdown and is admitted to a psychiatric institution. After recovering, he discovers that Indu survived the accident and eagerly seeks her out. However, he is devastated to learn that she has since married Dr. Verma. When Raj and Indu reconnect and share a private moment, Dr. Verma catches them together. Enraged, he attempts to kill them both, ultimately murdering Raj.

In a dark twist of fate, Dr. Verma is later confined to the very same mental institution where Raj was once treated. Consumed by obsession and vengeance, he remains determined to kill Indu at any cost.

== Cast ==
- Om Puri as Dr. Ram Kumar Verma
- Divya Rana as Indu Verma 'Dimpy'
- Raj Kiran as Raj
- Danny Denzongpa as Inspector Deepak
- Rakesh Bedi as Stage Actor Preetam
- Satish Shah as Inmate at C.T. Mental Hospital
- Kim as Item Dancer

== Music ==
The music of the movie was composed and directed by Pankaj Udhas, while the songs were sung by Asha Bhosle and Pankaj Udhas.

=== Track list ===
Song	Lyricist	Singer
"Chandi Jaisa Rang Hai"	Qateel Shifai	Pankaj Udhas
"Gaadi Na Chal Saki"		Aziz Nazan
"Deewaaron Se Milkar"	Qaisarul Jafri	Anuradha Paudwal
"Mohe Aayi Na Jag Se Laaj"	Mumtaz Rashid	Asha Bhosle
"Mera Mehboob Hai Ya"		Asha Bhosle
