= Garibon Ka Daata =

- VCD Cover
- Directed by: Ramesh Ahuja
- Produced by: Rajiv Kumar
- Starring: Mithun Chakraborty; Bhanupriya; Sumeet Saigal; Kader Khan; Prem Chopra; Divya Rana; Aruna Irani; Shakti Kapoor; Lalita Pawar; Asrani; Dhananjay Singh
- Music by: Bappi Lahiri
- Release date: 26 May 1989
- Running time: 135 minutes
- Country: India
- Language: Hindi

Garibon Ka Daata is a 1989 Indian Hindi-language film directed by Ramesh Ahuja, starring Mithun Chakraborty, Bhanupriya, Sumeet Saigal, Kader Khan, Prem Chopra, Divya Rana, Aruna Irani, Shakti Kapoor, Lalita Pawar, Asrani and Dhananjay Singh.

== Plot ==
Garibon Ka Daata is an action film with Mithun Chakraborty and Sumeet Saigal playing the lead roles, supported by Bhanupriya, Kader Khan, Prem Chopra and Shakti Kapoor.

== Cast ==
- Mithun Chakraborty Gopi Prasad
- Bhanupriya as Lata
- Sumeet Saigal Prakash Kapoor
- Kader Khan Zamindaar Shekhar Nanda
- Prem Chopra Sarpanch Natwarlal
- Divya Rana as Vimla
- Aruna Irani as Neeta
- Shakti Kapoor as Pagal Kamlesh Singh
- Lalita Pawar as Sarojini
- Asrani as PK Bhandari
- Dhananjay Singh as Suraj Dev Rana

== Songs ==
Lyrics: Anand Bakshi

1. "Oh Soniye" – Mohammed Aziz, Lata Mangeshkar
2. "Duniya Me Kaam Karo, Kaam Karo Naam Karo" – Shailendra Singh, Alka Yagnik, Anup Jalota
3. "Ek Ladki Kal Mili Thi, Mil Jaaye Aaj PhirTo" – Mohammed Aziz, S. Janaki
4. "Ekk Do Teen Char" – Sudesh Bhosle, Alisha Chinai
5. "Meri Dulari Jaan Se Pyari" – Shailendra Singh, Mahendra Kapoor, Usha Mangeshkar
