= Zulm Ko Jala Doonga =

- Directed by: Mahendra Shah
- Starring: Naseeruddin Shah; Sadashiv Amrapurkar; Kiran Kumar; Sumeet Saigal; Parikshit Sahni
- Music by: Nadeem-Shravan
- Release date: 10 June 1988
- Country: India
- Language: Hindi

Zulm Ko Jala Doonga is a 1988 Bollywood action film directed by Mahendra Shah, starring Naseeruddin Shah and Kiran Kumar in lead roles.

== Cast ==
- Naseeruddin Shah as Hariya
- Kiran Kumar as Dharamdas
- Sadashiv Amrapurkar as Police Inspector Mangesh Gandhe
- Parikshit Sahni as Police Commissioner
- Sumeet Saigal
- Bhagwan Dada
- Aruna Irani
- Manik Irani
- Parikshit Sahni

== Music ==
Song	Singer
"Sari Raat Jagaye, Mere Dil Ka Chain Churaye"	Alka Yagnik, Mohammed Aziz
"Dhak Dhak Dhak Dil Karne Laga"	Asha Bhosle, Mohammed Aziz
"Din Shuru Hota Hai Tere Naam Se"	Asha Bhosle, Mohammed Aziz
"Hai Nahin Aasan"	Mohammed Aziz
"Meri Behna Ko Lene"	Mohammed Aziz
"Meri Dua Hai Ja Behna"	Mohammed Aziz
"Rakhiwale Din Hogi"	Mohammed Aziz
