= Meri Lalkaar =

1990 Hindi-language film

- मेरी ललकार
- Directed by: Yesh Chauhaan
- Produced by: Kanti Shah
- Starring: Sumeet Saigal
- Music by: Vijay Batalvi
- Release date: 1 June 1990
- Country: India
- Language: Hindi

Meri Lalkaar (Hindi: मेरी ललकार) is a 1990 Indian Hindi-language film directed by Yesh Chauhaan, starring Sumeet Saigal in the lead role.

== Cast ==
- Sumeet Saigal as Insp Rajesh
- Sreepradha as Alka
- Rohini as Sarla
- Sadashiv Amrapurkar as Shyamu

== Soundtrack ==
The soundtrack was composed by Vijay Batalvi.

No.	Title	Singer(s)	Length
1.	"Dushman Banke Aaj Main Teri"	Anuradha Paudwal	5:07
2.	"Kabhi Jhatka Kabhi Seene Se"	Nitin Mukesh, Sadhana Sargam	4:26
3.	"Kabhi Jhatka Kabhi Seene Se v2"	Nitin Mukesh, Sadhana Sargam	3:36
4.	"Mere Jaani Ki Aankh"	Sudesh Bhosle, Dilraj Kaur;	5:20
5.	"Meri Lalkar" (Parody)"	Sudesh Bhosle, Satish Shah	6:53
6.	"One One Two I Love You"	Amit Kumar, Kavita Krishnamurthy	6:04
