= Shandaar (1990 film) =

1990 film directed by Vinod Dewan

Shandar
- DVD Cover
- Directed by: Vinod Dewan
- Written by: Iqbal Durrani
- Screenplay by: Iqbal Durrani
- Produced by: T. C. Dewan
- Starring: Mithun Chakraborty; Meenakshi Sheshadri; Mandakini; Juhi Chawla
- Music by: Bappi Lahiri
- Release date: 2 March 1990
- Running time: 135 minutes
- Country: India
- Language: Hindi
- Budget: ₹30 million

Shandar (transl. Magnificent) is a 1990 Indian Hindi-language film directed by Vinod Dewan. The film stars Mithun Chakraborty, Meenakshi Sheshadri, Mandakini, Juhi Chawla.

== Plot ==
Shanker is from a low-income household. He falls in love with Rani, a woman from the middle class. Anita Chaurasia, the daughter of multi-millionaire industrialist and politician Rai Bahadur Arjun Chaurasia, is another admirer of Shanker. Shanker discovers the specifics of Arjun's wrongdoings and sets out to expose him. When Arjun learns of Shanker's plans, he employs a known mobster named Daaga to dispose of Shanker. Daaga has never been fired from work.

== Cast ==
- Mithun Chakraborty as Shankar
- Meenakshi Sheshadri as Rani
- Mandakini as Anita
- Juhi Chawla as Tulsi
- Sumeet Saigal as Ashok
- Kader Khan as Rai Bahadur Arjun Chaurasia
- Danny Denzongpa as Daaga

== Music ==
Lyrics by Anjaan.

1. "Ek Main Hoon Ek Tu Hai" – Kishore Kumar, Alisha Chinai
2. "Sawan Barasata Hai" – Mohammed Aziz, Anuradha Paudwal
3. "Meri Umar Kunwari" – Mohammed Aziz, Alka Yagnik
4. "Haath Mein Mehndi" – Mohammed Aziz, Kavita Krishnamurthy
5. "Bade Logo Ki Badi Baat" – Anuradha Paudwal, Alka Yagnik, Shabbir Kumar
