= Watan Ke Rakhwale =

- Directed by: T. Rama Rao
- Written by: Kader Khan (dialogues)
- Screenplay by: M. D. Sundar
- Story by: M. D. Sundar; B. Krishna Rao
- Produced by: Firoz A. Nadiadwala
- Starring: Ashok Kumar; Sunil Dutt; Dharmendra; Mithun Chakraborty; Sridevi; Moushumi Chatterjee; Prem Chopra; Kader Khan; Shakti Kapoor; Divya Rana; Dan Dhanoa
- Cinematography: V. Durga Prasad
- Edited by: Waman Bhosle; Gurudutt Shirali
- Music by: Laxmikant–Pyarelal
- Production company: A. G. Films
- Release date: 14 August 1987
- Running time: 155 minutes
- Country: India
- Language: Hindi

Watan Ke Rakhwale (transl. Saviours of the Nation) is a 1987 Indian Hindi-language action thriller film directed by T. Rama Rao. It features an ensemble cast of Ashok Kumar, Sunil Dutt, Dharmendra, Mithun Chakraborty, Sridevi, Moushumi Chatterjee, Prem Chopra, Kader Khan, Shakti Kapoor, Divya Rana and Dan Dhanoa. The film revolves around how a spy plots to bring a terrorist to justice, and how he is helped out by his lover, his elder brother and sister-in-law and a jailed convict.

Watan Ke Rakhwale released worldwide on 14 August 1987, one day before the Indian Independence Day. It received mainly positive reviews from critics and was a commercial success, becoming the 7th highest-grossing film of 1987.

== Plot ==
Radha Pratap (Sridevi) lives a wealthy lifestyle with her widowed businessman dad Raja Pratap (Sudhir Dalvi), her maternal grandmother (Lalita Pawar) and paternal uncle, Dr. Narendra (Prem Chopra), who runs a mental hospital. Shortly after her father dies in a car accident, her marriage is arranged with equally wealthy Naresh Puri (Dan Dhanoa), the only child of Raj Puri (Kader Khan). When the marriage is about to be finalised, a man named Arun (Mithun Chakraborty) interrupts the ceremony, informing them that Radha is already married to him, and produces proof and a witness, Professor Peter Fernandes (Ashok Kumar).

The wedding is cancelled amidst chaos as Radha claims that she had never seen Arun, leave alone married him. A few days later, Narendra and Raj ask Radha to sign a divorce petition, which will annul the marriage so that she will be free to marry Naresh, which she does sign. When the time comes for her to move out, she refuses and admits that she made a mistake and admits having been married to Arun, who lives with his brother, Suraj Prakash (Sunil Dutt), a Jailor and his wife Laxmi (Moushumi Chatterjee). A few days later, Naresh is arrested by the Police for smuggling, and lodged in a jail, where he is killed by a convict named Mahaveer (Dharmendra), who had seen Naresh sexually molest his sister, Vimla (Divya Rana). Enraged at the death of his son, Raj has his men molest and threaten Laxmi. Shortly thereafter Narendra's body is found, knifed to death.

Suraj confesses to this crime, is arrested, tried in court and sentenced to 6 years in the very jail where he used to be the Jailor. Raj arranges the abduction of Radha, Laxmi and Arun and has them confined on an island that is not within the jurisdiction of any country. The questions remain, why did Arun claim that Radha is married to him? why did Suraj confess to kill Narendra? and what is going to be the fate of Raj's victims?

== Cast ==
- Ashok Kumar as Professor Peter Fernandes
- Sunil Dutt as Jailor Suraj Prakash
- Dharmendra as Mahaveer
- Mithun Chakraborty as Arun Prakash
- Sridevi as Radha Pratap
- Moushumi Chatterjee as Laxmi Prakash
- Prem Chopra as Dr. Narendra Pratap
- Kader Khan as Raj Puri
- Shakti Kapoor as Koya Koya Attache
- Divya Rana as Vimla "Vimli"
- Dan Dhanoa as Naresh Puri
- Lalita Pawar as Sarojini Puri, Radha's maternal grandmother
- Chandrashekhar as Police Commissioner Surinder Sodhi
- Mac Mohan as Mac
- Puneet Issar as Akbar
- Birbal as Psychiatrist Karan Rana
- Sudhir Dalvi as Raja Pratap
- Ashalata Wabgaonkar as Sudha, Mahaveer & Vimla's mother
- Baby Guddu as Young Vimla
- Parikshit Sahni as Assistant Jailor Madan
- Jack Gaud as Shamsher, Raj Puri's goon

== Songs ==
All lyrics are written by Majrooh.

Song	Singer
"Watan Ke Rakhwale"	Mahendra Kapoor
"Mata Bhi Tu, Pita Bhi Tu, Behna Ka Abhimaan Bhi Tu"	Mohammed Aziz, Anuradha Paudwal
"Jab Pyar Kiya, Ikraar Kiya, Dil Ne Phir Kyun Bekaraar Kiya"	Mohammed Aziz, Anuradha Paudwal
"Tere Mere Beech Mein Kaun Aayega, Aayega To Jagah Nahin Payega"	Mohammed Aziz, Kavita Krishnamurthy
"Tana Tan, Tana Tan, Baj Gayi Ghanti Sajan"	Suresh Wadkar, Mohammed Aziz, Kavita Krishnamurthy

== Box office ==
The film was a super hit and seventh highest-grossing movie of 1987.
