= Anuraag (1972 film) =

- Directed by: Shakti Samanta
- Written by: Vrajendra Gaur
- Screenplay by: Madhusudhan Kalelkar; Binoy Chatterjee
- Story by: Shakti Samanta
- Produced by: Shakti Samanta
- Starring: Vinod Mehra; Moushmi Chatterjee; Ashok Kumar; Nutan; Rajesh Khanna
- Cinematography: Aloke Das Gupta
- Edited by: Bijoy Choudhury
- Music by: S. D. Burman
- Production company: Shakti Films
- Distributed by: United Producers
- Release date: December 1972
- Country: India
- Language: Hindi

Anuraag is a 1972 Indian Hindi-language drama film, directed by Shakti Samanta. The film stars Moushumi Chatterjee, in her debut as a heroine, and Vinod Mehra in lead roles. The Shakti Samanta fixture Rajesh Khanna, having earlier made Aradhana (1969) and Kati Patang (1971) with Samanta, makes a special appearance. The music is by S. D. Burman. Initially, Samanta was unsure if the distributors would buy a film with such a storyline and had shared the idea with Rajesh Khanna, who encouraged Samanta and volunteered to make an extended appearance for the film, and also distributed the film under the banner "Shakti-Raj" (indicating Shakti Samanta and Rajesh Khanna).

The film became a semi-hit, while doing extremely well in big cities. and won the Filmfare Best Movie Award for the year. It was later remade into the Telugu film Anuragalu (1975) with Sridevi in her first leading role. A. Bhimsingh also remade it in Malayalam as Raagam (1975) and in Kannada as Chiranjeevi (1976). It was also remade in Tamil as Neela Malargal (1979).

== Plot ==
A blind sculptor, Shivani (Moushumi Chatterjee) stays in an ashram and makes friends with a young boy Chandan(Satyajeet), who is suffering from cancer. She falls in love with Rajesh (Vinod Mehra). Rajesh asks his parents to permit him to marry her, to which his mother agrees, but his father refuses. Then, an eye specialist reveals that an eye replacement would cure her. Later, as a dying wish, the young boy donates his eyes to her.

== Cast ==
- Vinod Mehra - Rajesh
- Moushmi Chatterjee - Shivani
- Ashok Kumar - Rai Saheb
- Nutan - Anu Rai
- Rajesh Khanna - Gangaram (Extended special appearance)
- Master Satyajeet - Chandan Rai
- Nasir Hussain - Anu's Father
- Murad
- David
- Asit Sen
- Madan Puri
- Anita Guha
- Abhi Bhattacharya
- Satyen Kappu

== Soundtrack ==
The soundtrack of the film contains 5 songs. The music is composed by S.D. Burman, with lyrics by Anand Bakshi

Anuraag

Soundtrack album by S. D. Burman
- Released: 1 December 1973
- Genre: Feature film soundtrack
- Length: 25:00
- Language: Hindi
- Label: Saregama
- Producer: S. D. Burman

S. D. Burman chronology
Zindagi Zindagi (1972)	Anuraag (1973)	Abhimaan (1973)

Songs
No.	Title	Singer(s)	Length
1.	"Ram Kare Babua (with Dialogues)"	Kishore Kumar	4:15
2.	"Tere Nainon Ke Main Deep Jalaoonga"	Lata Mangeshkar & Mohammed Rafi	3:36
3.	"Sun Ri Pawan Pawan Purvaiya"	Lata Mangeshkar	3:33
4.	"Neend Churayi Chain Churaye"	Lata Mangeshkar	4:13
5.	"Mera Raja Beta Boojhe Ek Paheli"	Lata Mangeshkar	4:05
6.	"Anuraag Theme (Instrumental)"	S.D. Burman	6:11
Total length:			20:49

== Awards and nominations ==
21st Filmfare Awards:

Won

- Best Film – Shakti Films
- Special Award – Rajesh Khanna

Nominated

- Best Actress – Moushumi Chatterjee
- Best Supporting Actress – Nutan
- Best Story – Shakti Samanta
