= Aasmaan =

- Directed by: Tony Juneja
- Produced by: Ustaha Ali Khan
- Starring: Rajiv Kapoor; Divya Rana; Tina Munim
- Music by: Anu Malik
- Release date: 1 April 1984
- Running time: 135 minutes
- Country: India
- Language: Hindi
- Budget: small

Aasmaan is a 1984 Bollywood movie starring Rajiv Kapoor, Tina Munim, Divya Rana and Mala Sinha. It was directed by Tony Juneja. Rajiv Kapoor plays a double role in the film as Kumar (as positive character) and lookalike Chandan Singh (as villain character).

== Cast ==
- Rajiv Kapoor
- Tina Munim
- Divya Rana
- Mala Sinha
- Sharat Saxena
- Roopesh Kumar
- Dinesh Hingoo
- Gurbachan Singh
- Rajni Sharma

== Music ==
Aasmaan

Soundtrack album by Anu Malik
- Released: 1983
- Recorded: 1983
- Genre: Film soundtrack
- Label: Music India

Anu Malik chronology
Ek Jaan Hain Hum (1983)	Aasmaan (1983)	Sohni Mahiwal (1984)

"Ban Ke Nazar Dil Ki Zubaan, Kehne Lagi Ik Dastaan", sung by Kishore Kumar, is an evergreen classic.

Lyrics:
Anand Bakshi

Song	Singer
"Banke Nazar Dil Ki Zubaan" – 1	Kishore Kumar
"Banke Nazar Dil Ki Zubaan" – 2	Kishore Kumar
"Jo Mere Kareeb Aayega, Jaan Jahan Se Jaayega"	Kishore Kumar, Asha Bhosle
"Tere Nain Hai Kaise, Mujhe Dekh Na Aise"	Kishore Kumar, Asha Bhosle
"Baghon Mein Lagiya Ambiya"	Asha Bhosle, Rajeev Kapoor
"Bharatpur Loot Gayo"	Dilraj Kaur
