= Param Dharam =

- DVD cover
- Directed by: Swaroop Kumar
- Produced by: Dimpy
- Starring: Mithun Chakraborty; Mandakini; Divya Rana; Amrish Puri
- Music by: Bappi Lahiri
- Release date: 13 November 1987
- Running time: 125 minutes
- Country: India
- Language: Hindi

Param Dharam is a 1987 Indian Hindi-language film directed by Swaroop Kumar and produced by Dimpy, starring Mithun Chakraborty, Mandakini, Amrish Puri and Sumeet Saigal

== Cast ==
- Mithun Chakraborty as Vijay/Ravi (Double Role)
- Moushumi Chatterjee as Savitri Singh
- Mandakini as Bijli
- Divya Rana as Munnibai
- Navin Nischol as Thakur Prem Singh
- Amrish Puri as Shamshera
- Sumeet Saigal as Rajesh
- Satish Shah as Tolaram
- Sudhir Dalvi as Thakur
- Viju Khote as Jagga
- Tiku Talsania as Narayan
- Dan Dhanoa as Shakti
- Gurbachan Singh as Manglu
- Rakesh Bedi as Kaushik
- Prema Narayan as Paris woman (guest appearance)

== Soundtrack ==
Lyrics: Anjaan

Song	Singer
"Main Loot Jaaun, Main Mit Jaaun"	Asha Bhosle
"Pyar Pyar Pyar, Pyar To Hai Pyar, Yaar Mere Yaar, Pyar Kar Pyar"	Asha Bhosle, Bappi Lahiri
"Jab Se Tujhe Piya Hontoon Se Chhoo Liya"	Asha Bhosle, Mohammed Aziz
"Allah, Jab Se Hui Main Jawan, Zamana Be-imaan Ho Gaya"	Asha Bhosle, Mohammed Aziz
"Duniya Ki Aisi Ki Taisi" (Parody Song)	Narendra Bhansali, Chandrani Mukherjee, Udit Narayan
"Ghungroo Toot Gaye"	Salma Agha
