= Himmat Aur Mehanat =

- VCD Cover
- Directed by: K. Bapaiah
- Written by: Kader Khan (dialogues); Indeevar (lyrics)
- Screenplay by: Amir Shamji
- Based on: Pachani Samsaram (1970)
- Produced by: B. S. Shaad
- Starring: Shammi Kapoor; Jeetendra; Sridevi
- Cinematography: A. Venkatesh
- Edited by: Subhash Sehgal
- Music by: Bappi Lahiri
- Production company: Brar Productions
- Release date: 27 November 1987
- Running time: 138 minutes
- Country: India
- Language: Hindi

Himmat Aur Mehanat (transl. Courage and Effort) is a 1987 Indian Hindi-language drama film, produced by B. S. Shaad under the BRAR Productions banner and directed by K. Bapaiah. It stars Jeetendra, Sridevi in the pivotal roles and music composed by Bappi Lahiri. The film is a remake of the Telugu film Pachani Samsaram (1970).

== Plot ==
Nurse Jyoti gets hired by a wealthy man, Madan, wins his confidence, and is permitted to virtually run the entire household. When Madan's son, Vijay Kumar, returns from New York, he sexually molests then eventually marries her. Then differences arise between her and Madan, and despite the birth of a son, escalate to the point when Madan and Vijay both accuse her of having an affair with another man, leaving her no choice but to leave the household. Vijay has a change of heart and goes to visit his son and estranged wife, but is shocked to find that they are not alone, and she has had another son.

== Cast ==
- Shammi Kapoor as Madanlal
- Jeetendra as Vijay
- Sridevi as Jyoti
- Poonam Dhillon as Sharda
- Divya Rana as Sona
- Raj Kiran as Raja
- Shakti Kapoor as Mahesh Chand
- Kader Khan as Trilok Chand
- Satyendra Kapoor as Madhav
- Asrani as Paplu
- Rajesh Puri as Daplu
- Iftekhar as Doctor Shyamlal Chaudhary
- Shubha Khote as Sheela ,Sona's Mother
- Yunus Parvez as Kalra

== Soundtrack ==
Indeevar wrote all songs.

Song	Singer
"Touch Me, Touch Me, I Want To Feel Your Body"	Kishore Kumar, Asha Bhosle
"Mumbai Roke To Roke, Dilli Roke To Roke"	Kishore Kumar, Asha Bhosle
"Chhuee Muee, Chhuee Muee Ho Gayi"	Mohammed Aziz, Asha Bhosle
"Woh Ek Dost Jo Mujhko"	Asha Bhosle
"Amma" (Happy)	Asha Bhosle
"Amma" (Sad) – 1	Asha Bhosle
"Amma" (Sad) – 2	Asha Bhosle
