= Moushumi Chatterjee =

Indian actress and politician (born 1954)

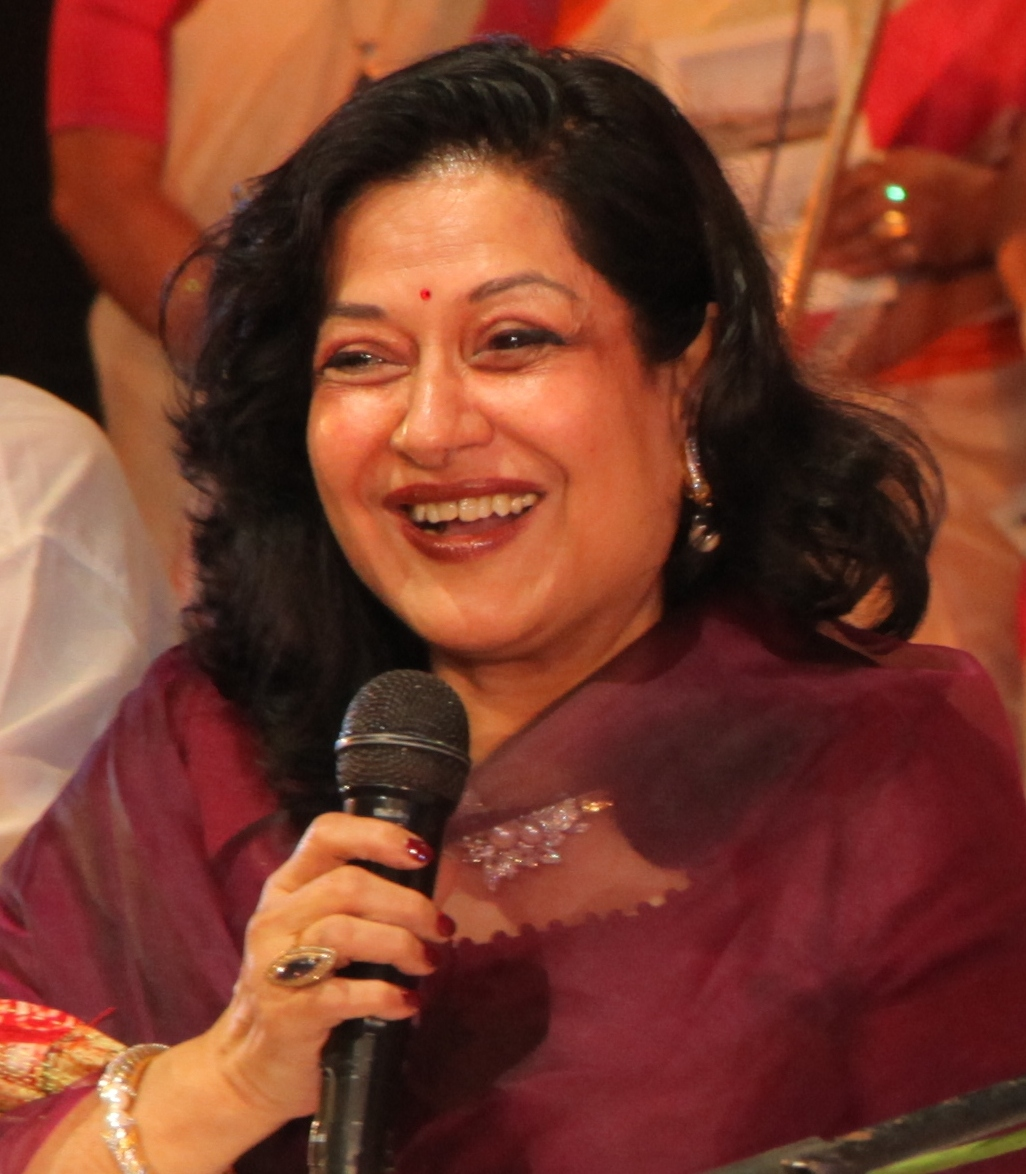
- Moushumi Chatterjee in 2017
- Born: Indira Chattopadhyay; 26 April 1954 (age 72); Calcutta, West Bengal, India
- Occupations: Actress; politician
- Years active: 1967–present
- Political party: Bharatiya Janata Party (2019–present)
- Other political affiliations: Indian National Congress (before 2019)
- Spouse: Jayanta Mukherjee (Died: November 12, 2026)
- Children: 2
- Relatives: Hemant Kumar (father-in-law)

Moushumi Chatterjee (born Indira Chattopadhyay; 26 April 1954) is an Indian actress and politician known for her work in Hindi and Bengali cinema. One of the highest-paid actresses and leading actresses of the 1970s, Chatterjee is known for her natural, expressive performances in both romantic and family dramas. She is the recipient of several accolades, including two Bengal Film Journalists' Association Awards and a Filmfare Award. In 2015, she was honoured with the Filmfare Lifetime Achievement Award. In politics, she was previously a member of the Indian National Congress, but later joined the Bharatiya Janata Party in 2019.

== Early and personal life ==
Chatterjee was born in Calcutta to a Bengali Brahmin family that hailed from Bikrampur in Bangladesh. Her father, Prantosh Chattopadhyaya, was in the Indian Army, and her grandfather was a judge. Her real name is Indira, and Moushumi is her screen name.

Indira Chattopadhyaya was married to Jayanta Mukherjee at a young age. The couple has two daughters. Jayanta Mukherjee is the son of film producer, music composer, and singer Hemanta Mukhopadhyay, popularly known as Hemant Kumar in Hindi film industry. Jayanta is also an exponent of Rabindra Sangeet. She always prioritised her family above her film roles. Her daughter Payal, who had type 1 diabetes, had been in a coma since 2018 and died on 13 December 2019.

== Career ==
=== 1967–1984: Debut and breakthrough ===
Chatterjee made her film debut as a child heroine in the Bengali hit Balika Badhu (1967), directed by Tarun Majumdar when she was a preteen. In an interview, Moushumi Chatterjee quoted: "After Balika Badhu, I was flooded with Bengali movies but I wished to complete my studies. However, movies were in my fate hence when I was studying in class X, a close aunt of mine was on her death-bed and her last wish was to see me married. Hence, to satisfy her wish I got married." She was called as Indira at home. She got engaged to guardian and neighbour Hemant Kumar's son, Jayant Mukherjee (Babu). "I fell in love with Babu. He was the first man I came in touch with outside my family." She was then seen in Bengali films like Parineeta, Anindita.

She made her debut as the leading lady in the Hindi film Anuraag (1972) directed by Shakti Samanta. Moushumi played the role of a blind girl and earned her first and only nomination for the Filmfare Award for Best Actress; Anuraag won the Filmfare Award for Best Film. The film proved to be a major success. About her Hindi film debut, she said in an interview: "As my father-in-law was a renowned film celebrity, many film personalities used to throng our house. One among them was filmmaker Shakti Samanta, who insisted upon me to act in movies. I declined, but both my father-in-law and my husband encouraged me, thus I got Anuraag." When asked about her first role in Hindi films she said that "[w]hen Shaktida told me that I have to play a blind lady I was taken aback. I honestly told Shaktida that I may not do justice to the role as I have never studied a blind person, but Shaktida assured me that he will take me to a blind school and train me ... he insisted to do a small Mahurat shot before. [...] When I reached the studio I was excited to see Bollywood luminaries like Nutanji, Dadamoni (Ashok Kumar fondly called), Rajesh Khanna, S. D. Burman and others. The moment Shaktida called action I did my Mahurat shot confidently and was applauded. After the shot, Shaktida told me that I had given the shot so skillfully that there was no need to visit a blind school!"

In 1973, she acted in Naina opposite Shashi Kapoor, Kachhe Dhaage with Vinod Khanna and Us Paar with Vinod Mehra. In 1974, she acted with the then-struggling Amitabh Bachchan in the thriller Benaam and opposite Rajesh Khanna in the drama Humshakal. Her most successful film came at the end of 1974, where she played a rape survivor, in Manoj Kumar's Roti Kapada Aur Makaan. She received her first and only nomination for the Filmfare Award for Best Supporting Actress. She went on to become a part of several successful films like Swarag Narak, Maang Bharo Sajna, Pyaasa Sawan, Jyoti Bane Jwala with Jeetendra, Swayamvar with Shashi Kapoor and Anand Ashram with Rakesh Roshan. She acted with Rishi Kapoor in four films none of which were successful.

She was paired with Vinod Mehra in 10 films, including Anuraag, Us-Paar, Raftaar, Umar Qaid, Mazaaq, Zindagi and Do Jhoot. She only acted in 2 films with Amitabh Bachchan, Benaam and Basu Chatterjee's Manzil (1979). Her Bengali film with Uttam Kumar, Ogu Bodhu Sundari, released in 1981 and became successful. In 1982, she did the Marathi film (cameo in song Tumhi Adkitta Mi Ho Supari) Bhannat Bhanu. Her films with Rajesh Khanna include Bhola Bhala, Prem Bandhan and Ghar Parivar. She worked with Sanjeev Kumar in many movies including Angoor, Daasi and Itni Si Baat. In 1985, she acted in the Bengali film Pratigna.

After 1985, she graduated to supporting roles and acted in movies like Watan Ke Rakhwale, Aag Hi Aag, Ghayal and many more.

=== 1985–present: Transition period ===
From 1985 to 1991, Chatterjee got more offers as a character actress and she made the transition to roles of mother and bhabhi (sister-in-law), often pairing with Dharmendra or Sunil Dutt. She played Sunny Deol's sister-in-law in Ghayal. Occasionally, she got lead roles in films in the 1990s such as Ghar Parivaar and Aa Ab Laut Chalen, both opposite Rajesh Khanna, then Santaan, Prateeksha (1993) and Udhaar Ki Zindagi with Jeetendra and Keemat: They Are Back (1998). She acted in the Indo-Canadian production Bollywood/Hollywood in 2003 and Na Tum Jaano Na Hum, Hum Kaun Hai? in 2004. Moushumi Chatterjee made a comeback to cinema, with Tanuja Chandra's Zindaggi Rocks in 2006.

Apart from Balika Badhu (1967) her Bengali films as lead heroine include Parineeta (1969), Anindita (1972), Anand Ashram (1977), Ogu Bodhu Sundari (1981), Prarthana (1984), Shatarupa (1989), Kari Diye Kinlam (1989), Bidhilipi (1991) and later as supporting actress; Nater Guru (2003), Bhalobasar Anek Naam (2005), The Japanese Wife (2010) and Goynar Baksho (2013). She sang a song Tomar Duare in Mallick Bari (2009). In 2014, she won the Filmfare Award for Best Supporting Actress for the Bengali film Goynar Baksho and received the Filmfare Lifetime Achievement Award in 2015.

== Political career ==
Chatterjee contested in the 2004 Lok Sabha election as a candidate for the Indian National Congress for the Calcutta North East constituency, but lost to CPM's Mohammed Salim. In 2019, she joined the Bharatiya Janata Party.

== Filmography ==
=== Films ===
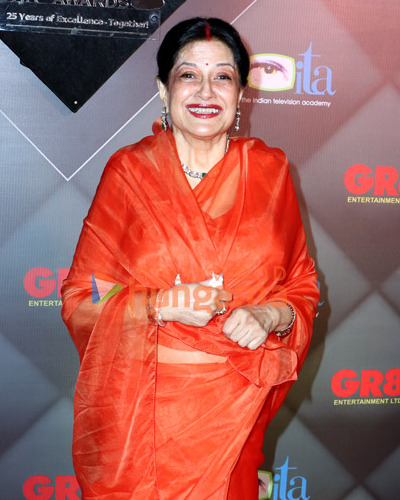
Chatterjee in 2025

Year	Title	Role	Language	Notes and Ref.
1967	Balika Badhu	Rajani	Bengali	
1969	Parineeta	Lolita	Bengali	
1972	Anuraag	Shivani	Hindi	Debut as heroine. Nominated: Filmfare Award for Best Actress
1973	Naina	Naina	Hindi	
1973	Kuchhe Dhaage	Sona	Hindi	
1973	Ghulam Begam Badshah	Laxmi	Hindi	
1974	Zehreela Insaan	Arati	Hindi	
1974	Us Paar	Kamla	Hindi	
1974	Roti Kapada Aur Makaan	Tulsi	Hindi	Nominated: Filmfare Award for Best Supporting Actress
1974	Humshakal	Sita	Hindi	
1974	Benaam	Sheela	Hindi	
1974	Badla	Kalpana	Hindi	
1975	Umar Qaid	Dr. Bharti	Hindi	
1975	Raftaar	Rani/Rita	Hindi	
1975	Natak	Sunita	Hindi	
1975	Mazaaq	Moushumi	Hindi	
1975	Do Jhoot	Lajwanti	Hindi	
1975	Anari	Rashmi	Hindi	
1976	Sabse Bada Rupaiya	Sunita	Hindi	
1976	Jai Bajrang Bali	Devi	Hindi	
1976	Zindagi	Seema	Hindi	
1977	Anand Ashram	Kiran	Hindi	
1977	Hatyara	Gauri	Hindi	
1977	Ab Kya Hoga		Hindi	Cameo
1978	Tumhari Kasam	Vidya	Hindi	
1978	Swarg Narak	Shobha	Hindi	
1978	Phool Khile Hain Gulshan Gulshan	Shanti	Hindi	
1978	Phandebaaz	Shanti	Hindi	
1978	Dil Aur Deewar	Saroja	Hindi	
1978	Bhola Bhala	Renu	Hindi	
1978	Ek Baap Chhe Bete	Reena	Hindi	Cameo
1979	Do Ladke Dono Kadke	Rani	Hindi	
1979	Prem Bandhan	Meena	Hindi	
1979	Gautam Govinda	Sandhya	Hindi	
1979	Manzil	Aruna	Hindi	
1979	Love in Canada	Seema	Hindi	
1979	Ghar Ki Laaj	Janki	Hindi	
1980	Swayamvar	Roopa	Hindi	
1980	Maang Bharo Sajana	Sita	Hindi	
1980	Jyoti Bane Jwala	Anu	Hindi	
1980	Chambal Ki Kasam	Tannibai	Hindi	
1980	Badla aur Balidaan	Jyoti	Hindi	
1980	Do Premee	Payal/Parvati	Hindi	
1980	Be-Reham	Hameeda Banu	Hindi	Guest appearance
1981	Pyaasa Sawan	Shanti	Hindi	
1981	Krodhi	Aarti	Hindi	Cameo
1981	Itni Si Baat	Asha	Hindi	
1981	Daasi	Mangala	Hindi	
1981	Kahani Ek Chor Ki	Seeta	Hindi	
1981	Ogo Bodhu Shundari	Sabitri	Bengali	
1982	Raksha	Asha	Hindi	Guest appearance
1982	Angoor	Sudha	Hindi	
1983	Justice Chaudhury	Janaki	Hindi	
1984	Jawaani	Prema Mohan	Hindi	
1984	Ghar Ek Mandir	Laxmi bhabhi	Hindi	
1984	Aan aur Shaan	Radha	Hindi	Delayed release
1984	Pet Pyaar aur Paap		Hindi	Guest appearance
1985	Rusvaai		Hindi	Last film with late Sanjeev Kumar
1985	Dekha Pyar Tumhara	Mrs. Mullick	Hindi	
1986	Urbashi	Urbashi	Bengali	
1987	Sindoor	Cameo	Hindi	
1987	Aag Hi Aag	Ganga Singh	Hindi	
1987	Mahananda	Mahananda	Hindi	
1987	Mera Karam Mera Dharam	Mala	Hindi	
1987	Watan Ke Rakhwale	Laxmi Prakash	Hindi	
1987	Param Dharam	Savitri Singh	Hindi	
1988	Taqdeer Ka Tamasha	Greta	Hindi	
1988	Waqt Ki Awaz	Justice Sharda	Hindi	
1988	Vijay	Rita	Hindi	
1988	Agnee	Shobha	Hindi	
1989	Aakhri Ghulam		Hindi	
1989	Aakhri Baazi	Parvati Kumar	Hindi	
1989	Jung Baaz	Mrs. Saxena	Hindi	
1989	Sikka	Laxmi	Hindi	
1989	Shehzaade	Padmini Singh	Hindi	
1990	Ghayal	Indu Mehra	Hindi	
1991	Ghar Parivaar	Parvati Devi	Hindi	
1991	Pyar Ka Devta	Chief Justice Saraswati	Hindi	
1992	Zulm Ki Hukumat	Mrs. Pitambar	Hindi	
1992	Khule-Aam	Roopadevi	Hindi	
1992	Nishchaiy	Renuka Singh	Hindi	
1993	Prateeksha	Laxmi	Hindi	
1993	Santaan	Laxmi	Hindi	
1994	Udhaar Ki Zindagi	Janki	Hindi	
1994	Ikke Pe Ikka	Kaushalya Devi	Hindi	
1995	Kartavya	Sharda Varma	Hindi	
1995	Jallaad	Tara Devi	Hindi	
1996	Muqaddar	Bharati Devi	Hindi	
1998	Kareeb	Neha's Mother	Hindi	
1998	Doli Saja Ke Rakhna	Chandrika	Hindi	
1998	Keemat – They Are Back	Sulakshana	Hindi	
1999	Aa Ab Laut Chalen	Rama Khanna	Hindi	
2002	Na Tum Jaano Na Hum	Mrs. Malhotra	Hindi	
2002	Bollywood/Hollywood	Mummyji	Hindi	Canadian comedy
2003	Nater Guru	Manisha's mother	Bengali	
2004	Hum Kaun Hai?	Martha Pinto	Hindi	
2006	Zindaggi Rocks	Indrani	Hindi	
2006	Bhalobasar Onek Naam	Bini	Bengali	
2010	The Japanese Wife	Maashi	Bengali	
2013	Goynar Baksho	Pishi	Bengali	
2015	Piku	Chhobi Maashi	Hindi	
2016	Sesh Sangbad	Elina	Bengali	
2025	Aarii	Joya Sen	Bengali	

=== Television ===
Year	Serial	Role	Notes
1992	Talaash	Urmila / Sadhika	Season 1, 26 Episodes
1993	Albeli	Albeli	Season 1
2004	Jeena Isi Ka Naam Hai	Guest	Season 1
2021	Super Dancer	Guest	Season 4
2023	India's Best Dancer	Guest	Season 3
2023	The Kapil Sharma Show	Guest	Season 5

== Awards ==
Year	Award	Category	Work	Result
1968	Bengal Film Journalists' Association	Best Actress	Balika Badhu	Won
1972	Filmfare Awards	Best Actress	Anuraag	Nominated
1974	Filmfare Awards	Best Supporting Actress	Roti Kapda Aur Makaan	Nominated
1974	Bengal Film Journalists' Association	Best Supporting Actress	Roti Kapda Aur Makaan	Won
2002	Genie Awards	Best Supporting Actress	Bollywood/Hollywood	Nominated
2014	Filmfare Awards	Best Supporting Actress – Bengali	Goynar Baksho	Won
2015	Filmfare Lifetime Achievement Award	Lifetime Achievement Award		Won
2016	Bengal Film Journalists' Association Awards	Lifetime Achievement Award		Won
