= Sumeet Saigal =

Indian Bollywood actor (born 1966)

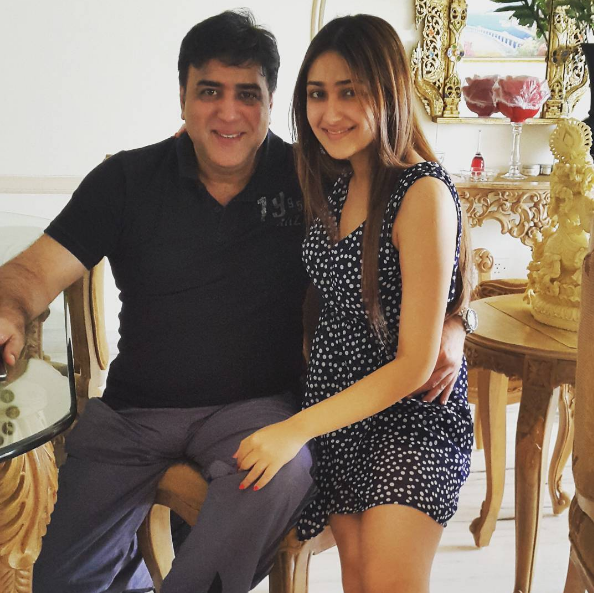
- Sumeet with his daughter Sayyeshaa
- Born: 18 February 1966 (age 60); Mumbai, Maharashtra, India
- Occupations: Actor; Producer; Distributor
- Years active: 1987-2010
- Spouses: Shaheen Banu (m. 1990; div. 2003) Farah Naaz (m. 2003)
- Children: Sayyeshaa
- Relatives: Tabu (sister-in-law); Arya (son-in-law)

Sumeet Saigal (born 18 February 1966) is an Indian former actor and producer who was active in Bollywood from 1987 to 1995, appearing in over 30 films. He went on to appear in television serials from 1995 to 2002.

== Career ==
Saigal made his debut in the 1987 film Insaniyat Ke Dushman and played leading or supporting roles in films with actors including Jeetendra, Sanjay Dutt, Govinda, Hemant Birje, Aditya Pancholi and Mithun Chakraborty. Some of his well-known films include Imaandaar (1987), Param Dharam (1987), Tamacha (1988), Lashkar (1989), Bahaar Aane Tak (1990), Pati Patni Aur Tawaif (1990) and Gunaah (1993). In 1995, he acted in his last films Saajan Ki Baahon Mein and Sauda and left the film industry.

He went on to appear in several television serials including Suraag, Aangan, Woh Kaun and Ujala.

In 2007, he directed the music video for a song featured in the film Red: The Dark Side. In 2010, he produced the horror film Rokkk, starring Udita Goswami and Tanushree Dutta. Currently, he has a production company named "Sumeet Arts", which dubs South Indian films into Hindi.

== Personal life ==
Sumeet is the son of cinematographer Krishan Saigal. His uncles are directors Naresh Saigal and Ramesh Saigal.

Sumeet married Shaheen Banu, the daughter of Sultan Ahmed, granddaughter of Naseem Banu, and niece of actress Saira Banu, in 1990. They have one daughter, Sayyeshaa, born in 1997, who is a film actress and made her debut in 2015. The couple divorced in 2003.

Sumeet later married actress Farah Naaz in 2003.

== Filmography ==
- 1987 - Imaandaar
- 1987 - Insaniyat Ke Dushman
- 1987 - Param Dharam
- 1988 - Tamacha
- 1988 - Zulm Ko Jala Doonga
- 1988 - Aag Ke Sholay
- 1989 - Apna Desh Paraye Log
- 1989 - Billoo Badshah
- 1989 - Dost Garibon Ka
- 1989 - Garibon Ka Daata
- 1989 - Lashkar
- 1989 - Sikka
- 1989 - Sindoor Aur Bandook
- 1989 - Souten Ki Beti
- 1989 - Ab Meri Baari
- 1989 - Apne Begaane
- 1989 - Nishane Baazi
- 1989 - Tu Nagin Main Sapera
- 1990 - Bahaar Aane Tak
- 1990 - Maha-Sangram
- 1990 - Meri Lalkaar
- 1990 - Nyay Anyay
- 1990 - Pati Patni Aur Tawaif
- 1990 - Shandaar
- 1990 - Choron Ki Rani Hasino Ka Raja
- 1990 - Kasam Dhande Ki as Satyaprakash
- 1991 - Khatra
- 1991 - Swarg Jaisaa Ghar
- 1991 - Mehandi Ban Gai Khoon
- 1991 - Naag Mani
- 1992 - Sarphira
- 1992 - Jethaa
- 1993 - Gunaah
- 1993 - Dharam Ka Insaaf
- 1994 - Janam Se Pehle
- 1995 - Saajan Ki Baahon Mein
- 1995 - Sauda
- 1996 - Sikander (video)
- 2002 - Samay Kheluchhi Chaka Bhaunri

=== Television ===
- Shadyantra (1996–1997)
- Suraag (1999)
- Aangan (1999–2003)
- Woh Kaun (2002)
- Ujala (2002)
- Zee Horror Show
- Tara (TV series)
