= Kaun Jeeta Kaun Haara =

- Theatrical release poster
- Directed by: Rakesh Kumar
- Produced by: Rakesh Kumar
- Starring: Amrish Puri; Aruna Irani; Kishore Kumar
- Music by: Usha Khanna
- Release date: 23 October 1987
- Country: India
- Language: Hindi

Kaun Jeeta Kaun Haara (lit. 'Who won? Who lost?') is a 1987 Hindi drama film directed and produced by Rakesh Kumar. The film features Aruna Irani, Kishore Kumar and Amrish Puri as main characters.

== Cast ==
- Kishore Kumar
- Aruna Irani
- Madhu Kapoor
- Amrish Puri
- Siraj Khan
- Amitabh Bachchan as Himself (Guest appearance)
- Dinesh Hingoo
- Pinchoo Kapoor
- Jagdeep
- Shobha Khote
- Vikas Anand
- Aruna Irani
- Suresh Oberoi
- Mohan Sherry

== Music ==
The music of the film was composed by Usha Khanna and the lyrics were penned by Kulwant Jani.

| # | Title | Singer(s) |
|---|---|---|
| 1 | "Jeena Pyar Bina" | Kishore Kumar, Amitabh Bachchan |
| 2 | "Achchhi Achchhi Mummy" | Bhavna Shah, Usha Khanna |
| 3 | "Sathi Hota Hai" | Mohammed Aziz, Usha Khanna |
| 4 | "Bahut Khubsoorat Hai" | Suresh Wadkar |
