= Raj Kiran (actor) =

Indian actor

- Kiran in the late 1970s
- Born: 17 June 1949 (age 77); Bombay, Bombay State, India
- Status: Missing
- Occupation: Actor
- Years active: 1973–2003
- Notable work: Kaagaz Ki Nao; Karz; Baseraa; Arth; Raaj Tilak; Waaris; Ek Naya Rishta; Hip Hip Hurray
- Spouse: Roopa Mahtani

Raj Kiran Mahtani (born 17 June 1949) is an Indian former actor, who is best known for his work in Bollywood films. He made his debut in B. R. Ishara's Kaagaz Ki Nao in 1975 and appeared in more than 100 films, until the 1990s. Kiran later disappeared from the film industry and was believed to have been living as a recluse in the United States, but conflicting reports from 2011, have indicated his current whereabouts are unknown.

== Career ==
Kiran made his acting debut opposite Sarika in B. R. Ishara's Kaagaz Ki Nao in 1975. In 1980, he appeared in 8 films and he started to get noticed. He appeared in leading roles in films such as Shikshaa (1979), Maan Abhiman (1980) and Ek Naya Rishta (1988). He also had supporting roles in films such as Karz (1980), Baseraa (1981), Arth (1982) and Raaj Tilak (1984). While Kiran was often cast as a kind-hearted romantic hero because of his chocolate boy good looks he also played some roles with grey shades, as in Justice Chaudhury (1983). His film career started to slow down in the 1990s. He also appeared in the acclaimed TV series Reporter (1994–1995) which also started Shekhar Suman.

== Personal life ==
Kiran was born in Bombay to a Sindhi Hindu family. He is rumoured to have gone into acute depression, when his career declined and faced several domestic crises and was later admitted to a mental asylum in Mumbai. He was later rumoured to have been living as a recluse, in the United States. Deepti Naval tried to look for Kiran through Facebook, writing: "Looking for a friend from the film world, his name is Raj Kiran – we have no news of him – last heard he was driving a cab in New York, if anyone has any clue, please tell . . ."

"I’ve been wondering where Raj had disappeared. The question was haunting me for a very long time. Then these rumours of Raj being no more began doing the rounds. I was really disturbed. How can a colleague with whom I shared a really good times, just vanish from the face of earth? I decided to look up Raj’s elder brother Govind Mahtani to find out about Raj. I was so relieved when Govind told me that Raj was alive. But he was confined to an institution in Atlanta due to health problems. ... apparently, he looks after his own treatment by working within the institution. It’s a heart-rending situation for an actor who was so successful at one time".

— Rishi Kapoor on Raj Kiran’s disappearance

In June 2011, Rishi Kapoor, who was on a trip to the United States, made a phone call to Kiran's brother Gobind Mahtani and was told that Kiran was in a mental asylum in Atlanta, but was not given more details. However Kiran's daughter, Rishika, subsequently issued a public statement, negating the reports of Kiran being found in Atlanta. She clarified that the family had been searching for him, with the assistance of New York police and private detectives for years.

== Filmography ==
Year	Film	Role	Notes
1975	Kaagaz Ki Nao	Raj	Debut film
1978	Kissa Kursi Ka	Gopal	
1979	Shikshaa	Vijay D. Gupta / Vinay	
1979	Prem Jaal	Kishen	
1980	Patita	Ashok	
1980	Karz	Ravi Verma	
1980	Bambai Ka Maharaja	Bitu	
1980	Manokaamnaa	Vikas Kashyap	
1980	Yeh Kaisa Insaf	Shankar	
1980	Maan Abhiman	Ajay Choudhary	
1980	Nazrana Pyar Ka	Raj Kumar Gupta	
1980	Saajan Mere Main Saajan Ki	Raj	
1981	Nakhuda	Ravi Shankar	
1981	Bulundi	Vicky	
1981	Baseraa	Sagar Kohli	
1981	Dhuan	Himself	
1981	Josh		
1981	Ladaaku		
1981	Kaaran	Suraj	
1981	Khara Khota	Vishwas Bahadur	
1982	Farz Aur Kanoon	Ravi	
1982	Teri Maang Sitaron Se Bhar Doon	Lord Kunwar Anand Kumar Singh	
1982	Bezubaan	Raman	
1982	Arth	Raj	
1982	Star	Shiv Kumar Verma	
1982	Jeeo Aur Jeene Do	Raj	
1983	Humse Na Jeeta Koi	Inspector Vijay Singh	
1983	Chatpati		
1983	Sun Meri Laila	Vikram "Vicky" Rai	
1983	Justice Chowdhary	Gopal (Jagannanth's son)	
1983	Mazdoor	Ramesh D. Saxena	
1984	Sardaar	Raj	
1984	Ghar Ek Mandir	Dr. Vicky	
1984	Raaj Tilak	Shamsher Singh	
1984	Hip Hip Hurray	Sandeep	
1984	Waqt Ki Pukar	Ajay	
1985	Aandhi-Toofan	Jaanu	
1985	Aaj Ka Daur	Rambabu Dard	
1985	Ghar Dwaar	Chander	
1985	Faasle	Shivraj Gupta	
1985	Arjun	Inspector Ravi Rane	
1985	Teri Meherbaniyan	Gopi	
1986	Ilzaam	Satish Singh	
1986	Begaana	Vinod Kumar	
1986	Shatru	Raj Choudhry	
1987	Woh Din Aayenga	Ravi-Kapil	
1987	Khooni Mahal	Raj	
1987	Mard Ki Zabaan	Anand	
1987	Mera Lahoo	Dharam Singh	
1987	Tera Karam Mera Dharam	Raj Kumar	
1987	Majaal	Rakesh	
1987	Goraa	Mohan	
1987	Aaj	Sumit	
1987	Himmat Aur Mehanat	Advocate Raja	
1987	Mard Ki Zabaan	Anand	
1988	Charnon Ki Saugandh	Laxmi's Husband	
1988	Hatya	Police Inspector Ashok Gupta	
1988	Dariya Dil	Vijay Kumar	
1988	Pyaar Ka Mandir	Ajay Kumar	
1988	7 Bijliyaan	Dacait Chitah	
1988	Ek Hi Maqsad	Raj	
1988	Aurat Teri Yeh Kahani	Balwant	
1988	Bahaar	Ram	
1988	Waaris	Sharvan Singh	
1988	Ek Naya Rishta	Rajiv "Raju" S. Tandon	
1989	Bade Ghar Ki Beti	Manohar	
1989	Tere Bina Kya Jeena		
1989	Jung Baaz	Inspector. Jwala Prasad Saxena	
1989	Aag Se Khelenge	Inspector Rakesh	
1989	Jurrat	Joseph	
1989	Sindoor Aur Bandook	Cameo	
1989	Kasam Vardi Ki	Vicky	
1989	Paanch Paapi	Vijay Singh	
1989	Awara Zindagi	Tony	
1989	Apna Ghar		Unreleased film
1990	Police Public	Vijay Sharma	
1990	Ghar Ho To Aisa	Vijay R. Kumar	
1990	Pyar Ka Devta	Advocate Gopal	
1990	Ghar Parivar	Balwant	
1991	Paap Ki Aandhi	Vijay	
1991	Karz Chukana Hai	Vijay Mathur	
1992	Naach Govinda Naach	Anand	
1993	Zakhmi Rooh	Rocky	
1994	Jazbaat	Inder Babu	
1995	Kartavya	Inspector Suraj Singh	
1996	Kalinga		Unreleased film
1997	Agnichakra	Inspector. Suryaveer	
1999	Chudail No. 1		
1999	Aaag Hi Aag	Inspector. Jwala Singh	
1999	Dulhan Banoo Main Teri	Koushi	
2014	Akeli	Avinash's First Boss	Delayed release

=== List of Shelved films ===
Year	Film	Notes
1973	Basera	
1974	Bobby in Bombay	
1977	Humdum	
1979	Hari Bhari	
1980	Sorry Madam	
1980	Apni Dharti Apni Log	
1981	Matlabi	
1982	Dekthe Hi Dekthe	
1982	Tu Hi Mere Manzil	
1983	Dhaage Ki Zanjeer	
1983	Ram Ka Bhai Lakshman	
1983	Naseeb Ki Baat	
1988	Aakhri Adam	
1992	Aurat Ki Adalat	
1999	Tabaahi	

== Television ==
- Amrita (1987 – 1988)
- Apariita (1993 – 1994)
- Reporter (1994 – 1995)
- Indrajaal (1995 – 1996)
- Aakhir Kaun (1996)
- Aahat (1997 – 1998)
- Yeh Hain Raaz (1998 – 1999)

== See also ==
- Brij Sadanah
- Divya Bharti
- Gulshan Kumar
- Guru Dutt
- List of people who disappeared mysteriously: post-1970
