= Chaalbaaz =

Chaalbaaz (lit. 'trickster') may refer to:

- Chaalbaaz (1958 film), a 1958 Bollywood film directed by Nanabhai Bhatt, starring Nirupa Roy and Jairaj
- ChaalBaaz, a 1989 Bollywood film directed by Pankaj Parashar
- Chalbaaz, a 2018 Indian Bengali-language film starring Shakib Khan
