= Yash Chopra filmography =

Yash Chopra's films

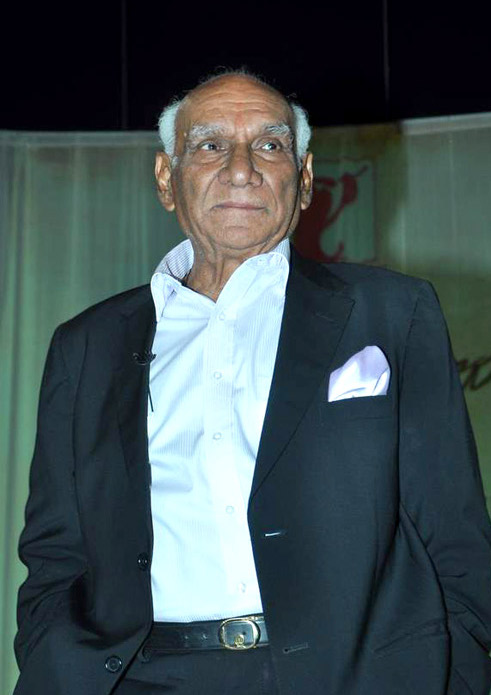
Chopra in 2012

Yash Chopra (1932–2012) was an Indian film director and producer known for his works in Bollywood. Acknowledged as one of the country's greatest filmmakers, he was credited by the media for "changing the face of romance to become a brand" in the industry. He made his directorial debut with the family drama Dhool Ka Phool, which was produced by his elder brother B. R. Chopra. The film, released in 1959, became a commercial success worldwide and gave him critical acclaim. Chopra's next film, Dharmputra (1961), failed to perform well at the box office but won the National Film Award for Best Feature Film in Hindi. In 1965, he directed the drama Waqt about a family who are separated due to a natural disaster. A commercial success, it was one of the earliest Indian films to star an ensemble cast and won a first Best Director trophy for him at the Filmfare Awards.

The 1980s was the most unsuccessful period of his career. Following the failure of his romantic drama Silsila (1981), which he co-wrote, directed and produced, Chopra's popularity began to wane. According to his biographer, the British academic Rachel Dwyer, this was because action and crime films were more popular at the time while most of his films were romances. Chopra experimented with making two action films, Mashaal (1984) and Vijay (1988), which underperformed financially but were well received by critics. Chandni was his only box-office success of the decade. Starring Sridevi in the title role, the film tells the story of a young woman who is accused of being responsible for her lover's accident. Chopra's career began to revive since its premiere in 1989; the film was named the Best Popular Film Providing Wholesome Entertainment at the 37th National Film Awards and considered one of his best films.

Chopra next directed and produced the intergenerational musical romantic drama Lamhe (1991). Although it did not succeed at the Indian box office, it proved to be a major commercial success in overseas territories. Parampara (1993) was the last film directed by Chopra but not produced under his company; reviewers were critical of it due to its clichéd storyline. The musical psychological thriller Darr (1993) and the romantic comedy Yeh Dillagi (1994)—both of which were produced by him, with Chopra serving as a director for the former—succeeded commercially. He later produced his son Aditya's directorial debut Dilwale Dulhania Le Jayenge (1995), the longest-running film in Indian cinema history. Chopra's next film, the musical romantic drama Dil To Pagal Hai (1997), was a major blockbuster and won the Filmfare Award for Best Film. After producing several films that performed well critically and commercially, including Mohabbatein (2000) and Saathiya (2002), Chopra returned to directing with the 2004 epic cross-border love saga Veer-Zaara, which critics lauded for its portrayal of India–Pakistan relations. The film won several best film trophies at major award functions, including that of Filmfare. Jab Tak Hai Jaan (2012) was the last film directed by him before his death.

== Films ==
List of films contributed to by Yash Chopra
Year	Title	Director	Producer	Notes	Ref.
1959	Dhool Ka Phool	Yes			
1961	Dharmputra	Yes			
1965	Waqt	Yes			
1969	Aadmi Aur Insaan	Yes			
1969	Ittefaq	Yes			
1973	Daag	Yes	Yes		
1973	Joshila	Yes			
1975	Deewaar	Yes			
1976	Kabhi Kabhie	Yes	Yes		
1977	Doosra Aadmi		Yes		
1978	Trishul	Yes			
1979	Kaala Patthar	Yes	Yes		
1979	Noorie		Yes		
1981	Nakhuda		Yes		
1981	Silsila	Yes	Yes		
1982	Sawaal		Yes		
1984	Mashaal	Yes	Yes		
1985	Faasle	Yes	Yes		
1988	Vijay	Yes	Yes		
1989	Chandni	Yes	Yes		
1991	Lamhe	Yes	Yes		
1993	Parampara	Yes			
1993	Aaina		Yes		
1993	Darr	Yes	Yes		
1994	Yeh Dillagi		Yes		
1995	Dilwale Dulhania Le Jayenge		Yes		
1997	Dil To Pagal Hai	Yes	Yes		
2000	Mohabbatein		Yes		
2002	Mere Yaar Ki Shaadi Hai		Yes		
2002	Mujhse Dosti Karoge!		Yes		
2004	Veer-Zaara	Yes	Yes		
2008	Rab Ne Bana Di Jodi		Yes		
2012	Jab Tak Hai Jaan	Yes			

== Bibliography ==
- Chopra, Anupama (December 2002). Dilwale Dulhania Le Jayenge. British Film Institute. ISBN 978-08-51709-57-4.
- Dwyer, Rachel (25 July 2019) [2002]. Yash Chopra: Fifty Years in Indian Cinema. British Film Institute. ISBN 978-08-51708-74-4.
- Raheja, Dinesh; Kothari, Jitendra (10 January 1996). The Hundred Luminaries of Hindi Cinema. India Book House. ISBN 978-81-75080-07-2.
- Somaaya, Bhawana (19 November 1999). Salaam Bollywood: The Pain and the Passion. Spantech & Lancer. ISBN 978-18-97829-54-7.
- Usman, Yasser (5 December 2014). Rajesh Khanna: The Untold Story of India's First Superstar. Penguin Books. ISBN 978-9-351-18875-9.
