= Ghar Ghar Ki Kahani =

Ghar Ghar Ki Kahani (lit. 'Story of Every Home') may refer to these Indian films:

- Ghar Ghar Ki Kahani (1970 film), a Hindi-language drama film
- Ghar Ghar Ki Kahani (1988 film), a Bollywood drama film

== See also ==
- Kahaani Ghar Ghar Kii, a 2000 Indian Hindi-language TV series broadcast by StarPlus
