= Farah (actress) =

Indian actress

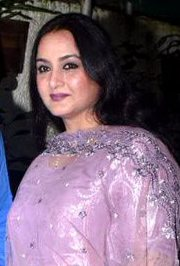
- Naaz in November 2019
- Born: Farah Naaz Hashmi; Hyderabad, Andhra Pradesh, India (now in Telangana, India)
- Occupation: Actress
- Years active: 1984–2005
- Spouses: Vindu Dara Singh (m. 1996; div. 2002) Sumeet Saigal (m. 2003)
- Children: 1 (son)
- Relatives: Tabbu (sister)

Farah Naaz Hashmi is an Indian Hindi film actress of the mid-1980s and mid-1990s. She is Tabu's elder sister.

Farah made her debut in Faasle in 1985 under the Yash Chopra films banner. She was one of the prominent actresses in Bollywood in the late 1980s and the mid-1990s. She was paired with Prosenjit Chatterjee in the 1989 Bengali movie Aamar Tumi. Farha's landmark films were Love 86 (1986), Naseeb Apna Apna (1986), Imaandaar (1987), Marte Dam Tak (1987), Woh Phir Aayegi (1988), Naqab (1989), Yateem (1988), Baap Numbri Beta Dus Numbri (1990), Begunaah (1991), Bhai Ho To Aisa (1995) and Sautela Bhai (1996). She also did three films with Rajesh Khanna.

She retired from acting in 1996 after her first marriage, though she later did a few television serials. She has worked with almost all of the top actors of her time, including Rajesh Khanna, Vinod Khanna, Rishi Kapoor, Mithun Chakraborty, Sanjay Dutt, Sunny Deol, Anil Kapoor, Jackie Shroff, Raj Babbar, Govinda, Aditya Pancholi, Aamir Khan, Kumar Gaurav, and Rahul Roy.

== Early life and background ==
Farah was born to Jamal Ali Hashmi and Rizwana in a Hyderabadi family. Her parents divorced soon after. Her mother was a school-teacher and her maternal grandparents were retired professors who ran a school. Her grandfather, Mohammed Ahsan, was a professor of Mathematics, and her grandmother was a professor of English Literature.

She is the niece of Shabana Azmi and Baba Azmi, and the elder sister of Tabu.

== Career ==
Farah made her debut in 1985 with Yash Chopra's Faasle opposite Mahendra Kapoor's son Rohan Kapoor. Although Faasle was a disaster, Farah got many other big offers such as Shakti Samanta's Palay Khan, K.C. Bokadia's Naseeb Apna Apna and Pran Lal Mehta's Love 86.

She was part of hits such as Marte Dam Tak, Imaandaar, Ghar Ghar Ki Kahani, Diljalaa, Rakhwala, Woh Phir Aayegi, Veeru Dada, Baap Numbri Beta Dus Numbri and Begunaah. Her performance in the hit films – Woh Phir Aayegi and Begunaah were critically acclaimed.

J.P. Dutta's Yateem got her critical acclaim, and it was one of her performance-oriented roles, along with films such as Hamara Khandaan, Kaarnama, Naqaab, Khatarnaak and Pati Patni Aur Tawaif, although they were commercial failures.

In the 1990s, she worked with Aamir Khan in two films; Jawani Zindabad and Isi Ka Naam Zindagi, but both flopped at the box office. She was signed for Khuda Gawah and she shot for a few scenes, but due to delays in production, she was later replaced with Shilpa Shirodkar. However, till date, her role in Woh Phir Aayegi and Begunaah with Rajesh Khanna are considered her best performances. Around the same time, she married Dara Singh's son Vindu Dara Singh.

Farah then started playing supporting roles in films such as Muqabla, Dhartiputra and Izzat Ki Roti. Muqabla was very successful, but later, her other films between 1993 and 1996 were not successful, though Sautela Bhai was a commercial hit and critically acclaimed.

She later switched to television and did serials such as Amar Prem, Andaz, Ahaa (all three produced by Himesh Reshammiya), Vailayiti Babu, Angan, Ardhangini, Aurat Teri Yehi Kahani and Papa. Farah was also planning a mega serial called Taqdeer, but the project got shelved. She then acted in 2004 in Hulchul.

== Personal life ==
Farah married actor Vindu Dara Singh in 1996, with whom she has a son Fateh Randhawa (b. 1997). The couple divorced in 2002. She married actor Sumeet Saigal in 2003.

== Filmography ==
=== Film ===
Year	Movie	Role	Language
2005	Shikhar	Kusum	Hindi
2004	Hulchul	Gopi	Hindi
2002	Bharat Bhagya Vidhata	Nagma	Hindi
2000	Bhai No 1	Neha	Hindi
1998	Achanak	Madhu	Hindi
1997	Lahoo Ke Do Rang	Sangita B. Srivastav	Hindi
1996	Hukumnama		Hindi
1996	Rab Dian Rakhan	Sandhya	Hindi
1996	Maahir	Paro	Hindi
1996	Namak	Dr. Anju	Hindi
1996	Sautela Bhai	Bindiya	Hindi
1995	Bhai Ho To Aisa		Hindi
1995	Hijack	Nandini	Malayalam
1995	Sarhad: The Border of Crime	Sandhya Mathur	Hindi
1995	Taaqat	Savitri	Hindi
1995	Fauji	Roopa	Hindi
1994	Janam Se Pehle	Geeta Bhardwaj	Hindi
1994	Chauraha	Dancer	Hindi
1994	Insaaf Apne Lahoo Se	Rani	Hindi
1993	Izzat Ki Roti	Pinky	Hindi
1993	Dhartiputra	Karma	Hindi
1993	Muqabla	Vandana	Hindi
1993	Jeevan Ki Shatranj	Radha V. Sharma	Hindi
1993	Kundan	Shanno	Hindi
1993	Zakhmo Ka Hisaab	Bindiya	Hindi
1992	Isi Ka Naam Zindagi	Chumki	Hindi
1992	Naseebwaala		Hindi
1991	Paap Ki Aandhi	Insp. Kiran Gupta	Hindi
1991	Begunaah	Guddu/ Nirmala 'Nimmo'/ Bulbul	Hindi
1991	Balidaan	Dancer/Singer	Hindi
1990	Pati Patni Aur Tawaif	Mrs. Shanti Saxena	Hindi
1990	Baap Numbri Beta Dus Numbri	Rosie D'Souza	Hindi
1990	Haar Jeet		Hindi
1990	Jawani Zindabad	Sugandha Srivastav	Hindi
1990	Jeene Do	Chanda	Hindi
1990	Kaarnama	Mala	Hindi
1990	Majboor	Priya	Hindi
1990	Khatarnaak	Dr. Sangeeta Joshi	Hindi
1990	Veeru Dada	Rekha	Hindi
1989	Ontari Poratam		Telugu
1989	Rakhwala	Ramtaki	Hindi
1989	Do Qaidi	Meenu	Hindi
1989	Aamar Tumi	Jhilik	Bengali
1989	Kala Bazaar	Kamini Sampat	Hindi
1989	Meri Zabaan	Baby	Hindi
1989	Naqaab	Asiya	Hindi
1988	Paap Ko Jalaa Kar Raakh Kar Doonga	Pooja Saxena/ Pooja D. Malhotra	Hindi
1988	Halaal Ki Kamai		Hindi
1988	Ghar Ghar Ki Kahani	Asha Dhanraj	Hindi
1988	Mohabbat Ke Dushman	Reshma	Hindi
1988	Hamara Khandan	Ruby Miranda	Hindi
1988	Yateem	Gauri S. Yadav	Hindi
1988	Mahakali		Hindi
1988	Woh Phir Aayegi	Aarti	Hindi
1987	Vijetha Vikram	Usha	Telugu
1987	Diljalaa	Mamta R. Gupta/ Maduri	Hindi
1987	Imaandaar	Renu S. Rai	Hindi
1987	7 Saal Baad		Hindi
1987	Marte Dam Tak	Jyoti R. Dayal	Hindi
1986	Love 86	Leena	Hindi
1986	Naseeb Apna Apna	Radha	Hindi
1986	Palay Khan	Helen Bonz	Hindi
1985	Faasle	Chandni	Hindi
1984	Nasbandi		Hindi
