= Marte Dam Tak =

- Directed by: Mehul Kumar
- Written by: Mehul Kumar
- Story by: Mehul Kumar
- Produced by: Pranlal V. Mehta
- Starring: Raaj Kumar; Govinda; Farah; Shakti Kapoor; Om Puri; Paresh Rawal
- Cinematography: Russi Billimoria
- Edited by: Yusuf Sheikh
- Music by: Ravindra Jain
- Production company: Prathima films
- Distributed by: Bombino Video Pvt. Ltd.
- Release date: 17 July 1987
- Running time: 155 minutes
- Country: India
- Language: Hindi

Marte Dam Tak (transl. Until my last breath/ Till death) is a 1987 Indian Hindi language crime film directed by Mehul Kumar, produced by Pranlal V. Mehta, starring Raaj Kumar, Govinda, and Farah. It is a complex, multi-layered drama centred around crime, revenge, justice, and family loyalty in a Mumbai underworld backdrop. It interweaves stories of violent gang conflicts, personal vendettas, and the pursuit of justice amid corruption and moral decay.

== Plot ==
Courteous Police Inspector Rane, intent on arresting notorious gangster P.C. Mathur finds himself on trial for murder and sentenced to five years behind bars due to being framed for the murder by his enemy. Following his prison term, Rane becomes an underworld operator known as Rana, intent on seeking revenge on Mathur and killing him. He hires Jai to kill Mathur, who mistakenly kills somebody else in the process. Jai, feeling angered by his mistake gives up a life of crime to concentrate on his family, leaving Rana alone to hunt down Mathur. It is now up to Rana to fulfil his quest, but avoid being killed first by Mathur's gang.

== Cast ==
- Raaj Kumar as Sub-Inspector R.B.Rane / Rana
- Govinda as Jai
- Farah as Jyoti
- Shakti Kapoor as Ricku
- Om Puri as Daulat / D. K.
- Aloknath as Judge Rameshwar Dayal
- Paresh Rawal as Inspector Khanna
- Kulbhushan Kharbanda as Gangster P. C. Mathur
- Iftekhar as DCP Lal
- C. S. Dubey as Tiwarilal
- Sudhir Dalvi as P. C. Mathur
- Ashalata Wabgaonkar as Sudha, Mrs P. C. Mathur
- Nivedita Joshi as Rajni Mathur
- Bandini Mishra as Radha
- Asha Sharma as Saraswati, Mrs Rameshwar Dayal
- Tej Sapru as Sonu

== Soundtrack ==
The soundtrack album of this film was composed and lyrics were penned by Ravindra Jain. Singers like Kishore Kumar, Mohammad Aziz, Mahendra Kapoor, Suresh Wadkar, Asha Bhosle, Alisha Chinai, Shabbir Kumar and Anuradha Paudwal gave their voices in this album. Songs like "Naam Se Kya Lena" and "Chhodenge Na Hum Tera Sath, O Sathi Marte Dam Tak" were big hits at that time.

| Song | Singer |
|---|---|
| "Naam Se Kya Lena" | Kishore Kumar |
| "Chhodenge Na Hum Tera Sath, O Sathi, Marte Dam Tak" | Mohammed Aziz, Anuradha Paudwal |
| "Muqabla, Muqabla, Aaj Bhaktjanon Ka Muqabla, Mauka Mila, Mauka Mila, Badi Mushkil Se Yeh Mauka Mila" | Mahendra Kapoor, Suresh Wadkar, Shabbir Kumar, Hemlata |
| "Dheere Dheere Kholungi" | Alisha Chinai |
| "Nautak Nautak" | Asha Bhosle |
