= Rohan Kapoor =

Rohan Kapoor may refer to:

- Rohan Kapoor (actor)
- Rohan Kapoor (badminton)
