= Begunaah =

- Movie Poster
- Directed by: Anil Suri
- Screenplay by: Abrar Alvi
- Story by: Sushma Suri
- Produced by: Anil Suri
- Starring: Rajesh Khanna; Farah
- Cinematography: D. K. Prabhakar
- Edited by: M. S. Shinde
- Music by: Rajesh Roshan
- Production company: A. R. Productions
- Release date: 4 January 1991
- Running time: 150 minutes
- Country: India
- Language: Hindi

Begunaah is a 1991 Indian Hindi-language crime drama film, produced and directed by Anil Suri under the A.R. Productions banner. It starred Rajesh Khanna, Farah in pivotal roles and music composed by Rajesh Roshan.

The film is a remake of 1977 Pakistani movie Salaakhein starring Mohammad Ali and Babra Sharif.

It was the 14th highest-grossing film of the year 1991.

== Plot ==
Widower Jeevanlal lives with his 5-year-old daughter in a small house. One day he meets with an accident and is unable to return home as he is admitted to the hospital. Meanwhile, due to heavy rains, an ill Guddu starts searching for her dad at night, gets giddy due to hunger and falls on the road. Jeevanlal returns home and sees she has the fever. Then Jeevanlal gets arrested for assaulting a Pharmacist as he is unable to afford medicines suggested by the doctor to treat his ill daughter, Guddu. Subsequently, Jeevanlal gets jailed, his repeated and vain attempts to escape from prison to meet his daughter only end up increasing his sentence, leaving Guddu to fend on her own. 8 years pass by. Guddu went to a school as while she was searching for her dad, a Marathi woman saw her and started to allow Guddu grow up in her house.

Meanwhile, during transfer from one jail to another, some prisoners died due to an accident, where Qaidi No. 8, Jeevanlal is presumed to be dead. Meanwhile, Jeevanlal manages to escape successfully from that accident, but due to his hunger for food he goes into a bungalow and when he is about to take food, the owner of the bungalow comes to the room, but Jeevanlal shows a knife at him, but the owner of the bungalow, just by glancing at Jeevanlal, says this man is not a thief for sure and introduces himself as Judge Dindayal. Jeevalal says do not send me back to prison as I have escaped only to meet my daughter and says he will kill Dindayal if he raises an alarm.

Dindayal asks his servant Bhola to give Jeevanlal food properly and says "Let him eat and sleep in our house in the same room where my deceased son used to sleep". The same night again Jeevanlal tries to run and steals a golden idol from the house. Bhola informs his owner that the guy who came last night has stolen the golden idol of God and ran away from the room. But the police of that city catch him while trying to sell that idol to a merchant and police inform the owner that the thief confessed that the idol was stolen from his house. Then the owner of the bungalow and the idol - Judge Dindayal - says this person is my friends' son named J.V. and has not stolen the idol, but in fact is the owner of the idol. Dindayal, though aware that escaped convict is at his home, decides to let Jeevanlal not get caught in the hands of the police.

Dindayal asks him why he is angry at God and then Jeevanlal narrates his sad story which happened in recent days. Dindayal says since his only son has already died and since he feels he can trust Jeevanlal, though he is a judge he is ready to give Jeevanlal a new lease of life, with the new name J.V. as he felt that fate was actually playing the game in life of both himself and Jeevanlal as he, though old, is forced to live in the world, whereas his young son died a premature death and on the other hand Jeevanlal was forced by fate to commit a crime which was necessary to take care of his daughter, but now even that daughter has got separated from him. Dindayal lets Jeevanlal stay in his house and take care of his assets and has advised him not to stop praying to God and gives him a bag full of cash for Jeevanalal to start a new life.

Six years later Jeevanlal will re-surface as a wealthy male and prospective Mayor knew now simply as J.V.; while his grown-up daughter Guddu (Farah Naaz) will be living two lives - one as the single mother Nirmala of a young boy child, Kiran; and the other as a gun-toting alcoholic dancer prostitute known as Bulbul. Nirmala, after her husband's death starts working in a factory owned by J.V., but due to her concentrating on her small baby's cry, she is thrown out by the factory management and to earn money she gets into the club dancer profession and sends her child to Rajan's Chachi (Shubha Khote). Now Nirmala decides to take revenge on the owner of the factory, J.V., for having changed her life (she was working in his factory only as a worker, but was thrown out and circumstances forced her to become a prostitute.

She dresses up like Bulbul, a modern prostitute and decides to meet up with J.V. and she says would he like to be her client for a day. J.V. slaps her, saying he is a good human being and the habit she has is really bad and that she is characterless. Jeevanlal though, does not know where his daughter is living and how she now looks, but comes across a child called Kiran on the road on a fine day. He asks Kiran why she is crying. Then Rajan Dada says he wants to sell that girl as she has been brought up by Chacha-Chachi in this area and its none of Jeevanlal's business. J.V. replies to him saying this girl reminds him of his own daughter Guddu and asks whether Kiran's mother's name is Nirmala. J.V. harbors doubt in his mind, but Rajan Dada and Chachi stop Kiran from disclosing her mother's name and J.V. asks Kulkarni to find the name of Kiran's parents. Later, he finds Bulbul again in the profession of prostitute and advises her saying that she should not be in this profession and that she is like a daughter to him. Then Bulbul says J.V. you are responsible me for being thrown out of your factory and making me a prostitute, otherwise I would have been a simple working-class woman.

Nirmala does not recognize her dad's face immediately, but soon her memory works and she realizes that J.V. is her own father from whom she got separated after that fateful night, but chooses to not let J.V. know the truth. Later Jeevanlal tries his best to solve all her problems including dealing with Rajan Dada, who is responsible for Nirmala's husband's early death and Kiran separating from her mother Nirmala. Later Bulbul confesses that she is Nirmala, none other than his own daughter, who was forced to live a horrific life, due to his absence in her life during teenage years and aftermath. Now J.V. solves every problem of her daughter's life, including ensuring that both Kiran and Nirmala unite and that Rajan Dada is killed.

== Cast ==
- Ashok Kumar as Judge Dindayal
- Rajesh Khanna as Jeevanlal/JV
- Jeetendra as Gautam (Special Appearance)
- Farah as Nimmo
- Raza Murad as Inspector Kulkarni
- Sadashiv Amrapurkar as Rajan Dada
- Chandrashekhar as Doctor
- Jagdish Raj as Police Inspector
- Amrit Pal as Kumar
- Shobha Khote
- Vinod Nagpal as Rajan Chacha

== Music ==
All songs are composed by Rajesh Roshan. It is the last released film where Kishore Kumar has sung for Rajesh Khanna.

Song	Singer
"Tere Mere Pyar Ka Aisa Naata Hai" (Happy)	Kishore Kumar
"Tere Mere Pyar Ka Aisa Naata Hai" (Sad)	Kishore Kumar, Sadhana Sargam
"Mohaniye Sohniye, Haan Dil Liya, Dil Diya"	Kumar Sanu, Sadhana Sargam
"Khareedaaron Bataao"	Asha Bhosle
"Na Do Humko Ilzaam"	Asha Bhosle

== Production ==
This is the first feature film directed by commercial film producer Anil Suri. The film was announced in 1990, shooting began in 1990, and was completed in 1991. It was released on 4 January 1991.
