= Kadhal Parisu =

- Theatrical release poster
- Directed by: A. Jagannathan
- Written by: R. M. Veerapan; A. L. Narayanan (dialogue)
- Produced by: G. Thyagarajan; V. Thamizhagan
- Starring: Kamal Haasan; Ambika; Radha
- Cinematography: B. S. Lokanath
- Edited by: K. R. Krishnan
- Music by: Ilaiyaraaja
- Production company: Sathya Movies
- Release date: 14 January 1987
- Country: India
- Language: Tamil

Kadhal Parisu (transl. Gift of Love) is a 1987 Indian Tamil-language film directed by A. Jagannathan, starring Kamal Haasan, Ambika and Radha in the lead roles. The film was released on 14 January 1987, Pongal day, and became a commercial success.

== Plot ==
The film opens with Mohan getting released from prison after serving a sentence on a rape charge. Malini and Chitra are sisters and heirs to a wealthy business. Malini looks after the business after their parents died while Chitra is a student. Mohan meets Chitra and soon they fall in love, while Malini has sworn off all men. Malini and Chitra’s uncle is after their wealth.

When Chitra brings Mohan home to meet her sister, Mohan and Malini have a big fight which ends in Malini forbidding Chitra from seeing Mohan. Malini then reveals the reason behind the fight. Years earlier, Mohan and Malini were classmates and lovers. While on a class trip, Malini gives a note to Mohan that asks him to meet her in his room. Malini claims that, that night, Mohan entered her room and they had consensual sex, but Mohan denied it and refused to marry her. So she bought up rape charges against him and sent him to prison.

The truth comes out. During the class trip, Mohan never received the note which fell on Kailash's brother, Anand, who was their classmate. Anand, lusting after Malini, uses this opportunity to enter Malini's room on the pretext of being Mohan and has sex with her. Since Anand disconnected the electricity in her room and the room was very dark, Malini didn't know the difference as she was drugged by Anand because he mixed a pill in her softdrink at the party. Malini shoots Anand for his act and also herself as she cannot live the rest of her life with the guilt. Mohan forgives Malini and Malini allows Chitra to love Mohan. Malini then dies in Mohan's arms.

== Cast ==
- Kamal Haasan as Mohan
- Ambika as Malini
- Radha as Chitra
- Poornam Viswanathan as Malini's father
- Rajkumar Sethupathi as Anand
- Jaishankar as Kailash
- Janagaraj as Malini's uncle
- Delhi Ganesh as Inspector
- Ravi Raghavendra as K. K. Bahadur
- Sivaraman
- Jeevan
- Kovai Sarala as Kanmani
- Disco Shanti
- Baby Sujitha
- T. K. S. Natarajan

== Production ==
The film was launched at Prasad Studios. The scenes of Haasan and Ambika were shot on that day with V. Thamilazhagan clapping the shot and R. M. Veerappan switching on the camera. The song "Hey Unnai Thane" was shot in a set inside AVM Studios. An emotional scene of Haasan and Ambika was shot at Revathi Studios.

== Soundtrack ==
The music was composed by Ilaiyaraaja. The song "Purakkale Purakkale" was originally composed and picturised for Bharathiraja's shelved film Top Tucker.

Track listing
No.	Title	Lyrics	Singer(s)	Length
1.	"Hey Unnai Thaane Nee Endha"	Vairamuthu	S. P. Balasubrahmanyam, S. Janaki	4:36
2.	"Jaathi Illai"	Gangai Amaran	Malaysia Vasudevan	4:23
3.	"Kaadhal Maharaani Kavidhai"	Muthulingam	S. P. Balasubramanyam, S. Janaki	4:28
4.	"Kanalukkul Meen Pidithen"	Na. Kamarasan	P. Susheela	4:33
5.	"Koo Koo Endru Kuyil Koovaadho"	Pulamaipithan	S. P. Balasubrahmanyam, S. Janaki	4:26
6.	"Puraakale Puraakale"	Vairamuthu	K J Yesudas, K. S. Chithra	4:11
Total length:				26:37

The movie was dubbed into Telugu as Kedi

No.	Title	Singer(s)	Length
1.	"Jaathi Eandhi"	S. P. Balasubrahmanyam
2.	"Kanule Palikene"	S. P. Balasubrahmanyam, S. Janaki
3.	"Koo Koo Koyile"	S. P. Balasubrahmanyam, S. P. Sailaja
4.	"Hey Ninne Ninee"	S. P. Balasubrahmanyam, S. Janaki
5.	"Amavasa Nisilo"	S. Janaki

== Reception ==
Jayamanmadhan of Kalki wrote that though the film had Haasan, Ambika, Radha, songs, dance, fights and chasing among others, it lacked completion.
