= Baap Numbri Beta Dus Numbri =

- Theatrical release poster
- Directed by: Aziz Sejawal
- Written by: Kader Khan
- Produced by: Iqbal Baig
- Starring: Kader Khan; Shakti Kapoor; Jackie Shroff; Farah; Aditya Pancholi; Sabeeha
- Cinematography: Arvind Laad
- Edited by: Waman Bhonsle; Gurudutt Shirali
- Music by: Nadeem-Shravan
- Production company: Magnum Films International
- Release date: 1990
- Running time: 147 minutes
- Country: India
- Language: Hindi

Baap Numbri Beta Dus Numbri (lit. 'Father's a number, son's a number 10'; transl. The son is a bigger thief than his father (Note: According to the Police Act, 1861, habitual criminals or recidivists are required by law to report at regular intervals to the local police station. Their names are stored in the No. 10 register; hence, "Number 10"/"Dus Numbri" is slang to such people or a notorious criminal in general.)) is a 1990 Indian Hindi-language action comedy film directed by Aziz Sejawal and produced by Iqbal Baig. The film features Kader Khan, Shakti Kapoor in pivotal roles, along with Jackie Shroff, Farah, Aditya Pancholi, and Anjana Mumtaz in supporting roles.

The film was remade in Kannada as Kalla Malla (1991). It was the eighth highest-grossing Indian film of 1990.

== Plot ==
The story begins with Gayatri Singh (Anjana Mumtaz) lovingly preparing a Rakhi for her wayward brother, Raman (Kader Khan), a small-time thief living in Mumbai with his young son, Prasad (Master Javed Hyder). However, Raman, a self-serving trickster, sees no value in the Rakhi and decides to sell it for money. He instructs Prasad to do the task, and the clever boy manages to sell the Rakhi by fabricating a sentimental story. With the money, he buys food, cunningly acquiring more than its worth and even manages to steal chocolates in the process.

Raman, determined to raise Prasad in his own deceitful ways, pulls him out of school and teaches him the tricks of the trade—lying, cheating, and stealing. Prasad quickly adapts and, under his father's guidance, steals a man's bag and a crutch to sell them. However, he is caught by his schoolteacher (Satyen Kappu), who attempts to discipline him. Raman intervenes, arrogantly asserting that his methods are superior and that his son will bow to no one. The father-son duo soon embark on a spree of cons, including one against a police officer (Mushtaq Khan). When their scams begin to attract attention, they decide to seek refuge with Gayatri. Though hesitant due to fear of her strict husband, Customs Officer Pratap Singh (Vijay Arora), Raman eventually sets off with Prasad, feigning sorrow.

Meanwhile, Pratap, an honest and fearless officer, meets his old friend Mr. D'Souza (Bharat Bhushan). Their reunion is cut short when local don Gullu Dada (Gulshan Grover) attempts to assassinate Pratap. In the ensuing gunfight, Pratap injures Gullu's men, but the don escapes into a tunnel. Pratap follows, only to be killed by Gullu. Though Gullu is later arrested, the damage is done—Gayatri, devastated by her husband's death, falls into a deep depression.

Raman, the very brother Gayatri once adored, has her committed to a mental asylum and abandons her young son, Ravi (Jackie Shroff), on a train. He then seizes and sells all of Gayatri's property and purchases a grand mansion for himself and Prasad.

Fifteen to twenty years later, Raman and Prasad have grown into notorious conmen, swindling both the innocent and the corrupt. Meanwhile, Ravi, who has no memory of his past, grows up to become a feared local enforcer, offering protection from Gullu Dada's gang in exchange for money, drawing the don's ire. Similarly, Rosy D'Souza (Farah), a fierce and independent woman, operates a protection racket of her own.

Unbeknownst to Ravi, he was rescued in childhood by a kind woman who later died, leaving him in the care of her daughter, Anita Singh (Sabeeha). Determined to provide for his adoptive sister, Ravi turns to crime. However, Anita remains unaware and believes he holds a respectable job. She eventually falls in love with Anil (Aditya Pancholi), an orphan. One day, Anil visits a friend working as a doctor at the mental asylum and encounters Gayatri, who has languished there for years without visitors. Moved by her plight, Anil, who longs for a mother himself, decides to adopt her as his own.

Upon learning about the injustices Gayatri suffered at the hands of her brother, Anil vows to avenge her. He travels to Mumbai and confronts Raman and Prasad, demanding they return Gayatri's rightful assets within 24 hours. Alarmed, the father-son duo seek help from Gullu Dada, but their plan backfires when Gullu is arrested for drug trafficking in a trap laid by Rosy.

Desperate, Raman and Prasad hire Ravi to eliminate Anil, offering him ₹5,000—money Ravi needs for Anita's college fees. A brutal clash ensues, leaving Anil hospitalised, but he is saved by Rosy. Anita, heartbroken, finally learns the truth about Ravi's criminal life. Ravi, in turn, realises Anil's noble intentions and decides to join him in seeking justice for Gayatri. Together with Rosy, they plan to dismantle Raman and Prasad's empire.

Rosy seduces Prasad, pretending to dislike elderly people, which causes a rift between him and his father. Meanwhile, Anil psychologically manipulates Raman, pushing him into paranoia. To deepen the discord, they introduce Premmati (a fictional fiancée for Ravi), who persuades Raman to adopt her brother as his heir. This stokes Prasad's jealousy, widening the rift. Eventually, father and son plot to kill each other, but the plan fails when Ravi, Anil, and Rosy record their confessions.

Ravi is reunited with Gayatri, who is overjoyed to have found her son and accepts Anil as family. However, before they can hand over the evidence to the police, Raman and Prasad, feeling betrayed, turn to Gullu Dada for revenge. In the climactic showdown, Gullu's men capture Rosy and Anita, and Gayatri is injured by Raman. But in an unexpected act of forgiveness, she chooses not to turn her brother in, prompting a change of heart in him.

As the final battle unfolds, Raman and Anil rescue Rosy and Anita, and Prasad, having realised his mistakes, joins the fight against Gullu. Gullu is killed, and Raman and Prasad are arrested for their crimes. In a comedic twist, it is revealed that Raman's father is also imprisoned, having attempted to con the authorities once again.

In the film's closing scene, the father, son, and grandfather—now cellmates—share a bowl of prison soup, reflecting humorously on the ironies of their fate.

== Cast ==
- Kader Khan as Raman / Dayashankar "Daddu" (Double Role)
- Shakti Kapoor as Prasad
- Jackie Shroff as Ravi Singh / Ravi Dada
- Farah as Rosy D'Souza
- Aditya Pancholi as Anil
- Sabeeha as Anita Singh
- Gulshan Grover as Gulshan / Gullu Dada
- Asrani as Various character
- Ram Sethi as Postman
- Vijay Arora as Custom Officer Pratap Singh
- Anjana Mumtaz as Gayatri Singh
- Bharat Bhushan as Mr. D'Souza
- Viju Khote as Orphaned Prisoner
- Yunus Parvez as Seth Bhogadmal
- Mushtaq Khan as Police Officer
- Satyen Kappu as School Master
- Mac Mohan as Goon
- Arun Bakshi as Goon
- Manik Irani as Kolhapuri Dada
- Ramesh Goel as Police Officer
- Javed Khan Amrohi as Dubai Traveller Hyderabadi
- Birbal as Dubai Traveller Blindman
- Jamuna as Prem pyari
- Thavakalai Chittibabu as Jamoora
- Master Javed Hyder as Young Prasad

== Soundtrack ==
Song	Singer
"Tun Tuna Tun, Tun Tuna Tun"	Amit Kumar
"Baap Numbri, Beta Dus Numbri"	Amit Kumar, Mohammed Aziz
"Dhum Dhum, Dholak Bajana"	Mohammed Aziz
"Haan, Pehli Baar Hua Hai, Mujhe Tujhse Pyar Hua Hai"	Mohammed Aziz, Anuradha Paudwal
"Mohabbat Humne Ki Hain, Aaj Hum Ikraar Karte Hain"	Anuradha Paudwal, Udit Narayan

== Awards ==
- Filmfare Award for Best Comedian - Kader Khan
