= Nalla Thambi =

- Poster
- Directed by: S. P. Muthuraman
- Screenplay by: Panchu Arunachalam
- Story by: M. Balayya
- Produced by: M. Saravanan; M. Balasubramaniam
- Starring: Karthik; Radha
- Cinematography: Jayanan Vincent
- Edited by: R. Vittal; C. Lancy
- Music by: Ilaiyaraaja
- Production company: AVM Productions
- Release date: 14 January 1985
- Running time: 125 minutes
- Country: India
- Language: Tamil

Nalla Thambi (/nəlləθəmbi/) is a 1985 Indian Tamil-language film, directed by S. P. Muthuraman and produced by AVM Productions, starring Karthik and Radha. It was released on 14 January 1985.

== Plot ==
Raja is a young man who has completed his MBA from the United States. On returning home, he discovers that all the young women in the city are eagerly waiting in his house, for him to marry one among them. However, though all the girls fail to impress Raja, Seetha manages to win the heart of his father, Chandrashekhar, who promises her marriage to him. Overjoyed, Seetha gears up for the wedding, but has crooked plans in her heart. Raja discovers that she is not really an admirable person, but is forced to marry her because of his father's coercing. However, his mother secretly helps him elope from home and eventually the wedding is called off. Raja runs into Chitra, a free-spirited girl who is being pressured by her three freakish "suitor" relatives to marry one among them. She requests Raja to act as her boyfriend so that her quirky suitors will back off in their pointless endeavor. Raja agrees and stays in her house, much to the dismay of her suitors. How they really fall in love and unite despite the hilarious obstacles that come their way, forms the rest of the plot.

== Cast ==
- Karthik as Raju
- Radha as Chitra
- T. S. B. K. Moulee as Chandrasekhar
- Manorama as Raju's mother
- V. S. Raghavan as Raghavan
- Anuradha as Seetha / Julie
- Senthil as Naidhu
- Y. G. Mahendran
- Kuladeivam V. R. Rajagopal

== Production ==
During the making of director S. P. Muthuraman's Nallavanukku Nallavan (1984), producer M. Saravanan promised to cast Karthik as the lead actor in a future film by the same director and studio AVM Productions; that became Nalla Thambi.

== Soundtrack ==
The music was composed by Ilaiyaraaja.

Song	Singer(s)	Lyrics	Duration
"Aati Vaccha"	Malaysia Vasudevan, Vani Jairam	Vaali	4:27
"Kalyaana Ponnirukku"	Malaysia Vasudevan, S. Janaki	Gangai Amaran	4:43
"Maama Maama"	S. P. Balasubrahmanyam, S. Janaki	Pulamaipithan	4:30
"Thangam Ival Angam"	S. P. Balasubrahmanyam, S. Janaki	Vairamuthu	4:29
"Vidiya Vidiya"	S. Janaki	Vaali	4:37

== Reception ==
Jayamanmadhan of Kalki wrote the film which starts in a funny manner fearing it would become a laughing stock turns serious in second half by adding elements like murder, it becomes unintentionally funny when the film ends humorously.
