= Gopurangal Saivathillai =

1982 film by Manivannan

- DVD cover
- Directed by: Manivannan
- Screenplay by: Manivannan
- Story by: P. Kalaimani
- Produced by: P. Kalaimani
- Starring: Mohan; Suhasini; Radha
- Cinematography: A. Sabapathy
- Edited by: L. Kesavan
- Music by: Ilaiyaraaja
- Production company: Everest Films
- Release date: 15 October 1982
- Running time: 135 minutes
- Country: India
- Language: Tamil

Gopurangal Saivathillai (Tamil pronunciation: [ɡoːbuɾaŋɡaɭ saːjiʋaðilːaɪ] transl. Gopurams do not tilt) is a 1982 Indian Tamil-language film directed by Manivannan and produced by P. Kalaimani. The film stars Mohan, Suhasini and Radha, while S. Ve. Shekher and Vinu Chakravarthy play supporting roles. It revolves around a man who is forcibly married to a woman he deems unattractive, and later begins a relationship with another woman.

Gopurangal Saivathillai is the directorial debut of Manivannan who wrote the screenplay from Kalaimani's story. It was released on 15 October 1982. The film was remade in Telugu as Mukku Pudaka (1983) with Suhasini reprising her role; in Kannada as Brahma Gantu (1985); and in Hindi as Naseeb Apna Apna (1986). The film was also the inspiration behind two Tamil TV series: Kasthuri (2006) and Sundari (2021).

== Plot ==
Arukkani is an illiterate village girl, and her father is upset at having not been able to find her a suitable groom. One day, her father meets his old friend Bhoothalingam and shares his woe with him; Bhoothalingam proposes that his son Murali marry her, and Arukkani's father accepts. Murali is a handsome, educated man and a successful sales manager. On hearing of his father's plans, he is excited to meet his future bride. However, on his wedding day, he is shocked to see Arukkani, whom he considers ugly. He only begrudgingly marries her. Murali continues to resent her deeply for the way she looks.

Later, Murali wins an award for the best salesperson of the year. During the awards ceremony in Delhi, he meets and befriends a young stylish girl called Julie. He then takes a transfer through work to Bangalore, leaving behind his father and wife, and lives in Julie and her brother Stanley's house. They fall in love, marry, and start their life. Two months later, Murali gets a telegram that his mother is sick and rushes home to find that it was a ruse. His dad forces him to take Arukkani with him to Bangalore. Grudgingly, Murali brings her to Bangalore and purposefully loses her in the railway station. However, in a twist of fate, Julie's elder brother meets Arukkani and brings her to their house that night. Arukkani is shocked upon discovering the truth but keeps quiet to save Murali. Julie hires Arukkani as a live-in maid until her supposed husband returns. She eventually transforms Arukkani into a beautiful and somewhat civilised woman.

A month later, both Arukkani and Murali's fathers pay them a visit. Arukkani's father discovers the truth and is shocked to the core, but Arukkani convinces him not to reveal the truth to Murali's father, fearing for her husband's safety. Arukkani's father agrees with a heavy heart. He convinces Murali's father to leave at midnight so as to give the couple some privacy. Both Murali and Stanley start to like Arukkani. Finally, Julie learns the truth and sends Murali away with Arukkani, keeping her pregnancy through Murali a secret from him.

== Cast ==
- Mohan as Murali
- Suhasini as Arukkani
- Radha as Julie
- S. Ve. Shekher as Stanley
- Vinu Chakravarthy as Bhoothalingam
- Manobala as Pathani Bhai
- Loose Mohan
- Senthil
- Sabitha Anand
- T. K. S. Chandran
- Kamala Kamesh
- Vellai Subbaiah
- Sundar
- Nalini
- Master Haja Sheriff

== Production ==
Gopurangal Saivathillai is the directorial debut of Manivannan, and was initially titled Arukkani.

== Soundtrack ==
The music was composed by Ilaiyaraaja.

Track listing
No.	Title	Lyrics	Singer(s)	Length
1.	"En Purushanthan"	Muthulingam	S. P. Sailaja, B. S. Sasirekha	4:05
2.	"Oorengum"	Gangai Amaran	Ilaiyaraaja	3:58
3.	"Poo Vaadaikatru"	Vairamuthu	S. Janaki, Krishnachandran	3:57
4.	"Pudhichalum Pudichen"	Avinashi Mani	Krishnachandran	4:14
5.	"Vaadi Samanja"	Vaali	P. Susheela	4:08
Total length:				20:22

== Release and reception ==
Gopurangal Saivathillai was released on 15 October 1982. Kalki appreciated the film for its story, Manivannan's direction and Suhasini's performance.

== Other versions ==
Gopurangal Saivathillai was remade in Telugu as Mukku Pudaka (1983) with Suhasini reprising her role; in Kannada as Brahma Gantu (1985); in Bangladeshi Bengali as Madam Fuli (1999); and in Hindi as Naseeb Apna Apna (1986). The film was also the inspiration behind two Tamil TV series: Kasthuri (2006) and Sundari (2021).
