= Radha (actress) =

Indian actress (born 1965)

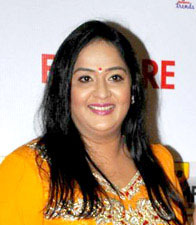
- Radha at 60th South Filmfare Awards 2013
- Born: Udaya Chandrika; 3 June 1965 (age 61); Kallara, Kerala, India
- Other name: Radha Nair
- Years active: 1981–1991, 2013 - present
- Political party: Bharatiya Janata Party
- Spouse: Rajasekaran Nair (m. 1991)
- Children: 3; including Karthika and Thulasi
- Relatives: Ambika (sister)

Udaya Chandrika (3 June 1965), better known by her stage name Radha (born 3 June 1965), is a former Indian actress, who predominantly appeared in Telugu and Tamil films in addition to a few Malayalam, Kannada and Hindi films. She was one of the top heroines in the film industry for about a decade, from 1981 to 1991, dominating the 1980s era.

Her elder sister Ambika, was an actress. Ambika and Radha acted together in a number of films, during the peak of their careers. They also co-owned a movie studio called "ARS Studios" in 1986. She appeared on television as one of the judges in the STAR Vijay Jodi Number One Season 7 and Season 8 Reality Dance programs.

== Personal life ==
Radha hails from Kallara Village near Kilimanoor in Thiruvananthapuram District in Kerala but she was born in Khammam district, Palwancha town in present Telangana State. She was born as Udaya Chandrika on 3 June 1965 and is the third daughter of Kallara Kunjan Nair and Sarassama. Her siblings are Ambika, Mallika, Suresh and Arjun. Her elder sister Ambika is also a popular actor.

Radha married hotelier Rajasekaran Nair (owner of Udaya Samudra group) on 10 September 1991. The couple has two daughters Karthika Nair, and Thulasi Nair and one son Vignesh Nair. After her marriage in 1991, Radha chose to completely step away from the limelight.

In 2021, Radha and her husband Rajasekaran Nair joined the Bharatiya Janata Party. Rajasekaran Nair was the party's candidate from the Neyyatinkara constituency for the 2021 Kerala Legislative Assembly election.

in 2026, She filed case against her sister Ambika and brother for fraud.

== Career ==
=== Tamil cinema ===
Radha started her career in 1981 starring as a Christian girl in director Bharathiraja's Tamil film Alaigal Oivathillai alongside debutant Karthik. The film was a runaway hit and is regarded as a cult classic. The on-screen chemistry that she shared with Karthik was highly successful and led to many films such as Ilanjodigal, Pakkathu Veetu Roja, Valibamey Vaa Vaa and Nalla Thambi. Radha played a small role in the film Tik Tik Tik, alongside Kamal Haasan. Later, she starred alongside Haasan in many movies such as Thoongadhey Thambi Thoongadhey (1983), Oru Kaidhiyin Diary (1985), Japanil Kalyanaraman (1985) and Kadhal Parisu (1987).

She received a Filmfare Award for Best Actress – Tamil for Muthal Mariyathai in 1985. The film was screened at the Indian Panorama section of the 1985 International Film Festival of India.

Ambika and Radha shared screen space in films such as Enkeyo Ketta Kural (1982), Vellai Roja (1983), Idaya Kovil (1985), Manakanakku (1986), Kadhal Parisu (1987) and Annanagar Mudhal Theru (1988).

She had commercial successes such as Amman Kovil Kizhakale (1986), Mella Thirandhathu Kadhavu (1986), Ninaive Oru Sangeetham (1987), Jallikattu (1987), Sattam Oru Vilayaattu (1987), Uzhavan Magan (1987) and Rajadhi Raja (1989). In Kollywood, she has performed alongside actors such as Sivaji Ganeshan, Sivakumar, Rajinikanth, Kamal Haasan, K. Bhagyaraj, Vijayakanth, Sathyaraj, Mohan, Prabhu, Karthik, T. Rajendar and Arjun.

=== Telugu cinema ===
Her notable films in Telugu include Shakthi (1983), Iddaru Dongalu (1984), Agni Parvatam (1985), Palnati Simham (1985), Ravana Brahma (1986), Simhasanam (1986), Yamudiki Mogudu (1988), Ramudu Bheemudu (1988) and State Rowdy (1989). She acted in 19 films alongside superstar Krishna, 16 films with Chiranjeevi, 6 films with Balakrishna and worked with all major Telugu heroes such as NTR, ANR, Krishnam Raju, Sobhan Babu and many more. Currently working Telugu television shows as judge.

=== Kannada cinema ===
She has acted in a few films in Kannada. She costarred with Vishnuvardhan and Lakshmi in Sowbhagya Lakshmi, a remake of Maang Bharo Sajana. She played Ravichandran's heroine in Savira Sullu. She played a cop in the action movie Ranachandi with Sarath Babu as her husband.

=== Malayalam cinema ===
Her most notable role was in K. G. George's state award-winning film Irakal in 1985; her portrayal of the character Nirmala is widely regarded as the best in her career. Her other significant role was in Sathyan Anthikad's Revathikkoru Pavakkutty (1986), where her costars were Bharat Gopy, Mohanlal and Menaka. She also produced the film Ayitham (1987), in which she played one of the lead characters, alongside Ambika, Sukumaran and Mohanlal. Innathe Program (1991) was her last movie in Malayalam.

== Filmography ==
=== Tamil films ===
Year	Film	Role	Notes
1981	Alaigal Oivathillai	Mary	Tamil Nadu State Film Award for Best Female Debut
1981	Tik Tik Tik	Radha	
1982	Adhisayappiravigal	Shanthi	
1982	Kadhalithu Paar		
1982	Ayiram Muthangal	Shakthi	
1982	Anandha Ragam		
1982	Thunai	Radha	
1982	Neram Vandhachu	Radha	
1982	Pakkathu Veetu Roja	Roja	
1982	Valibamey Vaa Vaa		
1982	Kanne Radha	Radha	
1982	Katrukenna Veli	Rekha	
1982	Ilanjodigal	Seetha	
1982	Gopurangal Saivathillai	Julie	
1982	Kaadhal Oviyam	Ponni	
1982	Enkeyo Ketta Kural	Kamatchi	
1983	Oru Kai Pappom		
1983	Nenjamellam Neeye		
1983	Vellai Roja	Merry Savari Muthu	
1983	Muthu Engal Sothu		
1983	Sandhippu	Chitra	
1983	Apoorva Sahodarigal		
1983	Thoongadhey Thambi Thoongadhey	Padmini	
1983	Thudikkum Karangal	Radha	
1983	Dhampathyam		
1983	Sivappu Sooriyan	Chithra	
1983	Paayum Puli	Revathy	
1984	Naan Mahaan Alla	Geetha	
1984	Ambigai Neril Vanthaal		
1984	Vengaiyin Mainthan	Radha	
1984	Ninaivugal		
1984	Kairasikkaran	Rekha	
1984	Iru Medhaigal	Radha	
1984	Sarithira Nayagan		
1984	Simma Soppanam	Ganga	
1984	Dhavani Kanavugal		Special Appearance
1985	Nalla Thambi	Chitra	
1985	Oru Kaidhiyin Diary	Rosy	
1985	Needhiyin Nizhal	Swapna	
1985	Muthal Mariyathai	Kuyil	Filmfare Award for Best Actress – Tamil
1985	Idaya Kovil	Suriya	
1985	Japanil Kalyanaraman	Radha	
1986	Amman Kovil Kizhakale	Kanmani	
1986	Manakanakku	Lakshmi	
1986	Mella Thirandhathu Kadhavu	Tulasi	
1986	Manithanin Marupakkam	Kala	
1987	Kadhal Parisu	Chitra	
1987	Enga Chinna Rasa	Rukmini	
1987	Ninaive Oru Sangeetham	Pandimeena	
1987	Vairakkiyam		
1987	Jallikattu	Radha	
1987	Sattam Oru Vilayaattu	Veni	
1987	Uzhavan Magan	Nirmala	
1987	Anand	Latha	
1987	Thambathyam	Latha	
1988	Annanagar Mudhal Theru	Latha	
1988	En Uyir Kannamma	Kannamma	
1988	Ullathil Nalla Ullam	Sheela	
1989	Rajadhi Raja	Senkamalam	
1989	Pick Pocket	Rajalakshmi	
1989	Nyaya Tharasu	Bharathi	
1989	Chinnappadass	Radha / Dr. Kavitha	
1989	Oru Ponnu Nenacha		
1989	Meenakshi Thiruvilayadal	Goddess Meenakshi	
1990	Seetha Geetha	Seetha	
1990	Sathyam Sivam Sundaram		
1990	Manaivi Vantha Neram		
1990	Manaivi Oru Manickam	Gayathri	
1990	Jagathalaprathapan		Guest appearance
1991	Sigaram	Priya	
1991	Marupakkam	Avayam	
1991	Santhi Enathu Santhi	Santhi	Guest appearance

=== Telugu films ===
Year	Film	Role	Notes
1982	Iddaru Kodukulu	Rani	
1982	Mr. Vijay		
1982	Gopala Krishnudu	Radha	
1982	Prema Moortulu		
1983	Chanda Sasanudu	Rani	
1983	Sakthi		
1984	Rowdy	Rekha	
1984	Naagu	Rajani	
1984	Goonda	Jayanti aka Jaya	
1984	Adarsavanthudu	Lakshmi	
1984	Vasantha Geetam	Madhavi / Mary	
1984	Dongalu Baboi Dongalu	Satya	
1984	Raktha Sambandham		
1984	Iddaru Dongalu		
1985	Adavi Donga	Saroja	
1985	Rakta Sindhuram	Rekha	
1985	Puli	Radha	
1985	Maa Inti Mahalakshmi	Nagalakshmi	
1985	Maha Manishi		
1985	Vintha Mogudu		
1985	Donga	Manjulatha	
1985	Agni Parvatam	Radha / Lulli	
1985	Palnati Simham	Bhavani	
1986	Rakshasudu	Shailaja / Shailu	
1986	Kondaveeti Raja	Padma	
1986	Simhasanam	Jaswanthi	
1986	Krishna Paramatma		
1986	Adavi Raja		
1986	Muddula Krishnayya	Radha	
1986	Driver Babu	Gowri	
1986	Kaliyuga Krishnudu	Anuradha	
1986	Nippulanti Manishi	Radha / Aasha	
1986	Ravana Brahma	Radha	
1987	Jebu Donga		
1987	Thandri Kodukula Challenge	Gowri	
1987	Trimurthulu		Cameo
1987	Dongodochadu	Radha	
1987	Muddayi		
1988	Marana Mrudangam	Anusha	
1988	Ramudu Bheemudu	Ganga	
1988	Yamudiki Mogudu	Radha	
1988	Donga Ramudu	Ganga	
1988	Raktabhishekam	Aparna	
1988	Jamadagni		
1988	Doragarintlo Dongudu		
1988	Bharya Bhartalu	Shanti	
1988	Rowdy No.1		
1988	Mugguru Kodukulu	Roja	
1988	Chuttalabbayi		
1988	Prana Snehithulu		
1989	Lankeswarudu		
1989	Soggadi Kaapuram	Rekha	
1989	Parthudu		
1989	Dorikithe Dongalu	Radha	
1989	Rudranetra	Hamsalekha	
1989	State Rowdy	Radha	
1989	Manchi Kutumbam	Tara	
1989	Ajatha Satruvu		
1989	Rickshawala		
1989	Sarvabhoumudu	Rani	
1989	Two Town Rowdy	Padmini / Puppy	
1989	Vicky Daada	Revathi	
1990	Kodama Simham	Bijili	
1990	Kondaveeti Donga	Sri Kanya	
1990	Qaidi Dada		
1990	Yama Dharmaraju		
1990	Aayudham		
1991	Pandirimancham	Madhuravani	
1991	Samasara Veena		
1991	Parama Sivudu	Gowri	
1991	Ramudu Kadhu Rakshasudu	Renuka	

=== Malayalam films ===
Year	Film	Role	Notes
1984	Umaanilayam	Uma	
1986	Irakal	Nirmala	
1986	Revathikkoru Pavakkutty	Susanna	
1987	Ayitham	Chinnaponnu	
1991	Innathe Programme	Indumathi	

=== Kannada films ===
Year	Film	Role	Notes
1985	Savira Sullu	Radha	
1987	Digvijaya		Cameo
1987	Sowbhagya Lakshmi	Lakshmi	
1991	Ranachandi	Susanna	
1991	Prema Rajya	Nirmala	

=== Hindi films ===
Year	Film	Role	Notes
1984	Kaamyab	Radha	
1986	Singhasan	Jaswanti	Made simultaneously alongside Simhasanam

== Television ==
Year	Name of Television Show	Role	Network
2013	Jodi Number One season 6	Judge	Star Vijay
2014	Jodi Number One season 7	Judge	Star Vijay
2015	Jodi Number One season 8	Judge	Star Vijay
2017	Jodi Number One season 9	Judge	Star Vijay
2019	Kalakka Povathu Yaru Season 8	Judge	Star Vijay
2020	Kodeeswari	Guest	Colors Tamil
2022	Super Queen	Judge	Star Maa
2022	BB Jodi	Judge	Star Maa
2022	Neethone Dance 2.0	Judge	Star Maa
2024	Cooku with Comali season 5	Guest	Star Vijay
2024	Mr. and Mrs. Chinnathirai season 5	Judge	Star Vijay
2025	Super Singer Season 10	Guest	Star Vijay
