= Kaamyab =

- Movie Poster
- Directed by: K. Raghavendra Rao
- Written by: Kader Khan(dialogues)
- Screenplay by: Satyanand
- Story by: Satyanand
- Based on: Shakti (1983)
- Produced by: G. Hanumantha Rao; Krishna (Presents)
- Starring: Jeetendra; Radha; Shabana Azmi
- Cinematography: K. S. Prakash
- Edited by: Kotagiri Venkateswara Rao
- Music by: Bappi Lahiri
- Production company: Padmalaya Studios
- Release date: 1984
- Running time: 141 minutes
- Country: India
- Language: Hindi

Kaamyab (transl. Successful) is an Indian Hindi-language action film, directed by K. Raghavendra Rao and produced by G. Hanumantha Rao under the Padmalaya Studios banner, presented by Krishna. Starring Jeetendra, Radha (in her Hindi debut) and Shabana Azmi, with music composed by Bappi Lahari. The film is a remake of Telugu movie Shakti (1983), starring Krishna, Jayasudha, Radha in pivotal roles.

== Cast ==
- Jeetendra as Ram / Kishan (Double Role)
- Radha as Radha
- Shabana Azmi as Seeta
- Shakti Kapoor as Janardan
- Kader Khan as Gulati
- Amjad Khan as Mahadev
- Asrani as Naamdev
- Vijayendra Ghatge as Rajesh
- Satyendra Kapoor as Dindayal

== Soundtrack ==
Song	Singer
"Dharti Apni Maa" (Short Version)	S. P. Balasubrahmanyam, Lata Mangeshkar
"Dharti Apni Maa" (Happy Version)	S. P. Balasubrahmanyam, Lata Mangeshkar
"Chhoti Chhoti"	Kishore Kumar, Asha Bhosle
"Dhakkam Dhakka"	Kishore Kumar, Asha Bhosle
"Ek Baar Dekha To"	Kishore Kumar, Asha Bhosle
"Ek Number Ka"	Kishore Kumar, Asha Bhosle
