= Mahendra Kapoor =

Indian playback singer (1934–2008)

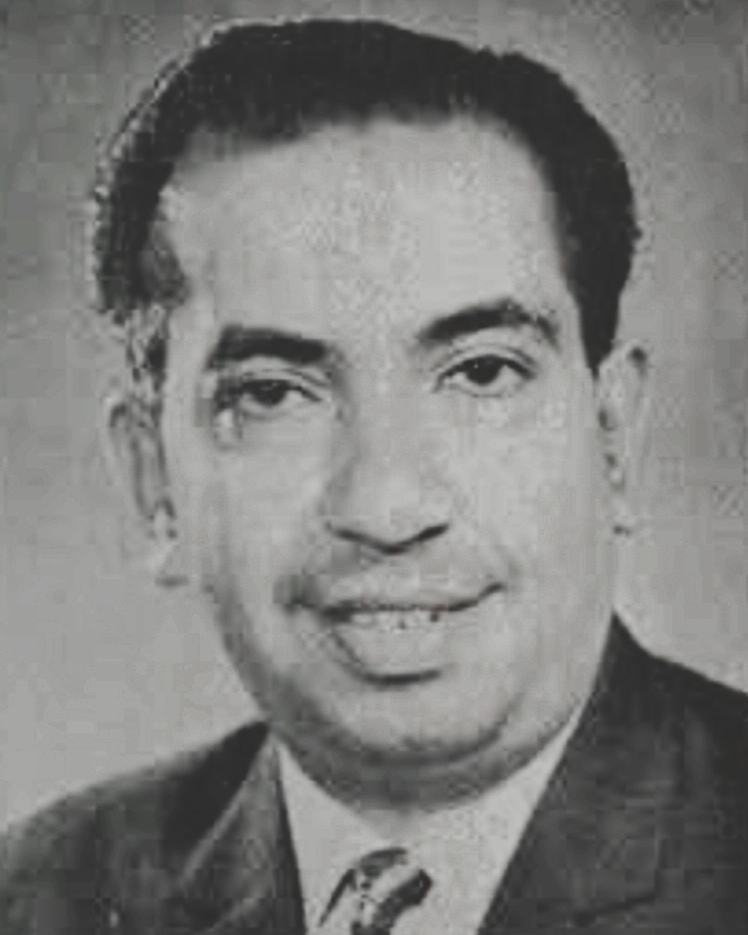
- Born: 9 January 1934; Amritsar, Punjab, British India
- Died: 27 September 2008 (aged 74); Mumbai, Maharashtra, India
- Children: Rohan Kapoor
- Relatives: Sidhant Kapoor (Grandson)
- Musical career
- Genre: Rafi Melody
- Occupation: Playback singer
- Instrument: Vocalist
- Years active: 1956–2002

Mahendra Kapoor (9 January 1934 – 27 September 2008) was an Indian playback singer. In a career spanning nearly five decades, his repertoire included popular songs such as Chalo ekbaar phir se Ajnabi ban jayen hum dono (Gumrah) and Neele Gagan ke tale (Hamraaz). His name however became most closely associated with patriotic songs including Mere Desh Ki Dharti in Manoj Kumar's film Upkaar. He considered Mohammad Rafi as his Guru. In 1972, he was awarded the Padma Shri by the Government of India. He lent his voice to actors Manoj Kumar and Sunil Dutt in most of their films and had a lengthy association with director-producer Baldev Raj Chopra.

== Biography ==
Mahendra Kapoor was born in Amritsar, but soon moved to Bombay. At an early age, he was inspired by legendary singer Mohammed Rafi and considered him his mentor. He started learning classical music under classical singers like Pt. Hussanlal, Pt. Jagannath Bua, Ustad Niaz Ahmed Khan, Ustad Abdul Rehman Khan and Pt.Tulsidaas Sharma. Kapoor created a style of his own moulded largely on Rafi and won the Metro Murphy All-India singing competition, which led to his debut as a playback singer in V. Shantaram's Navrang in 1958, singing Aadha Hai Chandrama Raat Aadhi, under the musical direction of C. Ramchandra. Some of Kapoor's most notable songs were the ones he performed in B.R. Chopra's films (Dhool Ka Phool, Gumrah, Waqt, Hamraaz, Dhund, Nikaah and Awam (film) and TV series Mahabharat); and for Manoj Kumar (Upkaar, Purab Aur Paschim).

Kapoor had a very large vocal range, and he is sometimes known as The Vibrant Voice of India. He was the first Indian playback singer to record music in English. He was asked by the group Boney M to sing their songs in Hindi with Musarat from Pakistan, which resulted in the Pop Album M-3. Some of the songs on the album are Chori Chori Chalo!! (Original, Hoorray! Hoorray! by Boney M), O Meri Champe Ki Daali. Most of the hit songs sung by Mahendra Kapoor which are famous, are from B. R. Chopra movies or Manoj Kumar's movies. His song from Bandhan, Shakti, Doli, Ek Nazar, Admi Aur Insaan, Sangam and Tawaif are also quite popular.

Mahendra Kapoor also sang a duet with Mohammed Rafi. The song was Kaisi Haseen Aaj Baharon Ki Raat from the 1967 film Aadmi, which was originally recorded as a duet with Rafi and Talat Mehmood. Manoj Kumar, one of the lead stars refused to use Talat's voice for him and the song was re-recorded with Kapoor replacing Talat.

Kapoor sung in a large number of Indian languages and is the playback singer who has performed in the largest number of in Gujarati, Punjabi, Bhojpuri and Marathi movies. In Marathi, he was very popular for being the voice of Dada Kondke in all his movies. In spite of being associated with Dada Kondke's colloquial style his singing for Marathi movies was not limited to Dada Kondke's movies only.

Kapoor was married and had three daughters and one son. His son Rohan Kapoor is an actor and singer, who acted in a few films in the 1980s such as Yash Chopra's Faasle (1985) and Love 86 (1986), and Prakash Mehra's Imandaar, and later did stage shows together with his father.

On September 27, 2008, Kapoor died following a cardiac failure at his home in Mumbai, aged 74. He was survived by his wife, children, children-in-law and grandchildren.

Mahendra Kapoor is one of the golden era singers. He remained as one of the most popular singers in Bollywood. He voice-acted for Varendra, Mehar Mittal, Prem Nath etc.

== Notable songs ==
=== Hindi ===
- Unhe Dekhen Toh – Madmast (1953) Mahendra Kapoor sang debut movie song with Pandit Shiv Dayal Batish known as S.D Batish
- Kisi Ke Zulm Ki – Madmast (1953 ) Mahendra Kapoor sang with Dhan Indorewala
- "Tere Pyaar Ka Aasra" – Dhool Ka Phool (1959)
- "Aadha Hai Chandramaa Raat Aadhi" - Navrang (1959)
- "Aap Aaye Tho Khayal" - Gumrah (1963)
- "Chalo Ek Baar" – Gumrah (1963)
- "Chhod Kar Tere Pyar" - Woh Kaun Thi (1964)
- "Har Dil Jo Pyaar Karega" - Sangam (1964) (trio with Lata Mangeshkar and Mukesh)
- "Mera Pyar Woh Hai" – Yeh Raat Phir Na Aayegi (1965)
- "Badal Jaaye Agar Maali" – Baharen Phir Bhi Aayengi (1966)
- "Ye kali jab talak phool banke khile" – Aaye Din Bahar Ke (1966)
- "Kisi Pathar Ki Moorat Se" – Hamraaz (1967)
- "Na Muh Chupa Ke Jiyo" – Hamraaz (1967)
- "Neele Gagan Ke Tale" – Hamraaz (1967)
- "Tum Agar Saath Dene Ka Wada Karo" – Hamraaz (1967)
- "Tu Husn Hai Main Tujmein" – Hamraaz (1967)
- "Mere Desh Ki Dharti" – Upkar (1967)
- "Lakhon Hain Yahan Dilwale" – Kismat (1968)
- "Jiske sapne humen roz aate rahe" – Geet (1970)
- "Iktara Bole" – Yaadgar (1970)
- "Bharat Ka Rahnewala Hoon" – Purab Aur Paschim (1970)
- "Hey Ramchander keh gaye Siya se"- Gopi (1970)
- "Sansar ki har shae" - Dhund (1973)
- "Aur Nahin Bas Aur Nahin" – Roti Kapada Aur Makaan (1974)
- "Fakira Chal Chala Chal" – Fakira (1976)
- "Ab Ke Baras" – Kranti (1981)
- "Andhere Mein Jo Baite" - Sambandh (1982)
- "Beete Hue Lamhon Ki Kasak Saath" – Nikaah (1982)
- "Chehra Chupaliya Hai Kisi - Nikaah (1982)
- "Dil Ki Yeh Arzoo Te Koi - Nikaah (1982)
- "Mangi Thi Ek Duajo - Shakti (1982)
- "KAB TALAK SHAMA JALI" – Painter Babu (1983)
- "JAB YAAD KI BADLI CHAHTI HAI" – Painter Babu (1983)
- "Dil Hi Dil Mein Le Liya" - Aaj Ki Awaaz (1984)
- "Tere Pyar Ki Tamanna" - Tawaif (1984)
- "De Daru De Daru" - Karma (1986)
- "Dekh Tamasha Lakdi ka" - Insaaf Ki Manzil (1988)
- Title Song of Mahabharat (1988)

=== Marathi ===
- Dhagala Lagali Kala वरं ढगाला लागली कळं....पाणी थेंब थेंब गळं....
- Ti Yete Aneeka Jate..Yetana kadhi kalya aneete ती येते आणिक जाते,येतांना कधि कळ्या आणिते,
- He Chincheche zad dise maj chinar vrukshapari हे चिंचेचे झाड दिसे मज चिनार वृक्षापरी
- Ratris khel chale ya gudh chandanyacha, sampel na kadhihi ha khel savalyancha रात्रीस खेळ चाले या गूढ चांदण्याचा संपेल ना कधीही हा खेळ सावल्यांचा
- Abol Zalis ka saajani.. अबोल झालीस का साजणी
- Saang kadhi kalanar tula.. सांग कधी कळणार तुला
- Sur tech chhedita.. सूर तेच छेडीता, गीत उमटले नवे
- Madhu ithe ana chandra tithe.. मधू इथे अन् चंद्र तिथे झुरतो अंधारात
- Swapnaat pahile je te roop hech hote.. स्वप्‍नात पाहिले जे ते रूप हेच होते
- Nako menaka nako urvashi ...
- Anjanichya suta tula Ramacha Vardaan

=== Gujarati ===
- "Dhuni Re Dhakhavi Beli Ame Tara Namni ધૂણી રે ધખાવી બેલી અમે તારા નામની" - Jesal Toral (1971)
- "Pela Pela Jug Ma raani" - "પેલા પેલા જુગ માં રાણી તું હતી પોપટી ને"
- " Bhiksha De Ne Maiya Pingda" - "ભિક્ષા દે ને મૈયા પિંગળા"
- Aankhiyun Man Gori - Vir Mangdavalo (1978)
- Ruperi Raatma - Vir Mangdavalo (1978)
- "Suraj Ugta Santani - Vir Mangdavalo (1978)
- Aashak Mashuk Samasami- Vir Mangdavalo (1978)

=== Bhojpuri ===
- "Ishq Karaye O Jiski Jeb Me" - Bidesiya (1963)
- "Hansi Hansi Panda Khiwanle" - Bidesiya (1963)
- "Ab To Chala Sambhal Ke Chacha" - Ayeel Basant Bahar (1965)
- "Hamre Hatwa" - Mai Ka Lal (film) (1979)
- "Hamka Lai Chal" - Mai Ka Lal (film) (1979)
- "Aaj Mahafil Mei" - Mai Ka Lal (film) (1979)
- "Upar Baithal Ek" - Mai Ka Lal (film) (1979)
- "Doliya Utha Ke" - Bhaiya Dooj (1984)
- "Jaan Marat Ba Goriya" - Paan Khaye Saiyan Hamaar (film) (1984)
- "Kehu Se Chhodul Okar" - Kaisan Banaul Sansar (1989)
- " Doli Chadhi Bhaili Bahini" - Kaisan Banaul Sansar (1989)

=== Other languages ===
- "Saagarakanyaka" - Priya

== Awards ==
- 1972 – Padma Shri
- National Film Award for Best Male Playback Singer
  - 1968 Won – "Mere Desh Ki Dharti" – Upkar
- Filmfare Award for Best Male Playback Singer
  - 1964 Won – "Chalo Ek Bar" – Gumrah
  - 1968 Won – "Neele Gagan Ke Tale" – Hamraaz
  - 1968 Nominated – "Mere Desh Ki Dharti" – Upkar
  - 1975 Won – "Aur Nahi Bus Aur Nahi" – Roti Kapda Aur Makaan
  - 1977 Nominated – "Sunke Teri Pukar" – Fakira
- Maharashtra State Film Award
  - Maharashtra State Film Award for Best Male Playback Singer For Song Saang Kadhi Kalnar Tula
  - Maharashtra State Film Award for Best Male Playback Singer For Song Anjanichya Suta.

=== Others ===
  - 1967 Won – "Mian Tansen Award" – Sati Nari – Tum Nacho Ras Barse
  - 2000 Won – "Bollywood Music Awards- New York" – Life Time Achievement Award
  - 2002 Won – "Lata Mangeshkar Puruskar" – Madhya Pradesh State Award
  - 2008 Won – "Maharashtra State Award" – Life Time Achievement
