= Yash Chopra (book) =

Biography by Rachel Dwyer

- Cover of the UK edition
- Author: Rachel Dwyer
- Language: English
- Subject: Yash Chopra
- Genre: Biography
- Published: 29 April 2002
- Publisher: British Film Institute; Roli Books
- Publication place: United Kingdom; India
- Media type: Print
- Pages: 256
- ISBN: 978-0-85170-874-4

Yash Chopra (known as Yash Chopra: Fifty Years in Indian Cinema in India) is a biography written by the British professor and author Rachel Dwyer, chronicling the life and career of the Indian filmmaker Yash Chopra. The book details Chopra's birth in 1932 in Lahore, his career both as a director and producer, and his 1970 marriage to the then-playback singer Pamela, with whom he had two sons Aditya and Uday. The British Film Institute published Yash Chopra on 29 April 2002 in the United Kingdom and Roli Books did so on 30 July in India.

While writing All You Want is Money, All You Need is Love: Sexuality and Romance in Modern India (2000), Dwyer saw Chopra on a televised interview in 1993, which aired following the release of Darr. She watched the film and was impressed by it. She subsequently conceived a biography about the filmmaker and with some difficulty held meetings to interview him. Upon its release, the book received mixed reviews, with Dwyer's writing garnering the most appreciation, but her literal translation of Chopra's interviews from Hindi and Urdu to English generated critical negative responses.

== Summary ==
Yash Chopra includes seven chapters: "Yash Chopra: Cinema and Biography", "From Assistant to Director", "The Founding of Yash Raj Films", "The Amitabh Bachchan Films", "The Lean Years", "Romantic Films", and "Production".

The book begins with Yash Chopra's birth on 27 September 1932 in Lahore to the Central Public Works Department officer Lal Vilayati Raj Chopra and Draupadi (died 1979). He has six siblings, including one sister, Vimla (born 1920), and five brothers: Hansraj (1902–64), Baldev Raj (1914–2008), Kuldeep Raj (born 1916), Dharam Raj (born 1924), and Rajkumar (born 1928). After graduating with a Bachelor of Arts degree in 1950 in Jalandhar, Chopra joined his brother, Baldev Raj, a filmmaker in Bombay. Baldev Raj subsequently offered him the opportunity to direct Dhool Ka Phool, which marked his directorial debut. The film was released in May 1959 and emerged as a commercial success. The financially successful romance, Waqt (1965), won him his first Filmfare Award for Best Director.

In 1970, Chopra married the playback singer Pamela, with whom he had two children, Aditya (born 1971) and Uday (born 1973). Daag (1973) marked Chopra's first project as a producer. In 1981, the romantic drama Silsila opened in theatres and is considered one of his most controversial films. Starring Amitabh Bachchan, Jaya Bachchan, and Rekha, the book states that the film was surrounded by speculation of a "love-triangle" affair between the three, leading to its shooting being done secretly. The film did not do well at the box office, disappointing Chopra. The 1980s marked the beginning of the most unsuccessful period of Chopra's career. His next films—such as Sawaal (1982), Mashaal (1984), Faasle (1985), and Vijay (1988)—failed to attract large enough audiences to be successful.

The book examines three films Chopra produced and directed that were well received by audiences and critics, including Chandni (1989), Lamhe (1991), and Dil To Pagal Hai (1997). The romantic films Chandni and Lamhe, both of which feature Sridevi in the lead role, received nominations for the Filmfare Award for Best Film, which Lamhe won. The musical Dil To Pagal Hai was the most successful of the three and was acknowledged as the Best Popular Film Providing Wholesome Entertainment at the 45th National Film Awards. In 1995, he produced Aditya's directorial debut Dilwale Dulhania Le Jayenge, the longest-running film in Indian cinema history. The book ends with information about the production of Mujhse Dosti Karoge! (2002) and the success of the self-established entertainment company Yash Raj Films.

== Development and writing ==
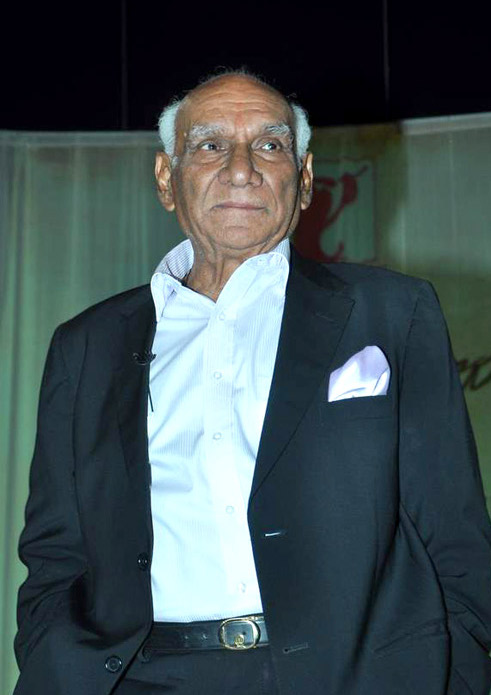
Yash Chopra is about the life and career of the Indian filmmaker of the same name

The British professor and author Rachel Dwyer was teaching at the SOAS University of London and researching for her book All You Want is Money, All You Need is Love: Sexuality and Romance in Modern India (2000) when she saw Chopra for the first time in 1993 on an unmentioned televised interview. It aired shortly after the release of his romantic thriller, Darr. In it, he talks about 1990s films and anti-hero characters.^{:x} Dwyer admitted after watching Darr that she was impressed by it, and praised its soundtrack and the performances of the cast, especially that by Shah Rukh Khan.^{:x–xi} Having described herself as an admirer of his, she found the filmmaker to be "polite, correct, quiet, thoughtful yet totally unromantic". She described her book, which was later titled after the subject, as a research-based academic study of him.^{:x}

In March 1996, Dwyer wrote to Chopra asking to meet him; he did not respond. Later that year, when she was in Mumbai, she finally met him. He would only see her for an hour. She recalled that Chopra, who is also a businessman running his company Yash Raj Films, received many calls which interrupted their conversation. Dwyer confessed she felt disappointed and consequently decided to abandon the project in February 1997. However, while she was accompanying him during the shooting of one of his films, she realized Chopra was "an altogether different person, a high-spirited, [and a] hard-working creative filmmaker" despite her experiences with him. For the next months, she rendezvoused with him in India and the United Kingdom and communicated through faxes and by telephone. She became his friend.^{:xii}

The book's primary source is Chopra's interviews with her in English, Hindi, and Urdu between 1997 and 2001. According to Dwyer, Chopra spoke in Hindi or Urdu when he was tired of speaking English. She later translated his words into English and there is a likelihood of confusion. She was fascinated with his use of English, commenting that it was "a mixture of old-fashioned government school English", modern English, and American slang. The interviews took place at his office, his house, shooting locations and his car. Dwyer said that his idiosyncratic expression entertained her. Apart from that, Dwyer faced an "unusual" difficulty writing the book; for instance, Chopra talked in what she described as an elusive way. She also collected information from trade and gossip magazines, his colleagues, and several journalists, including Jerry Pinto and Khalid Mohamed.^{:xii–xiii}

== Release and reception ==
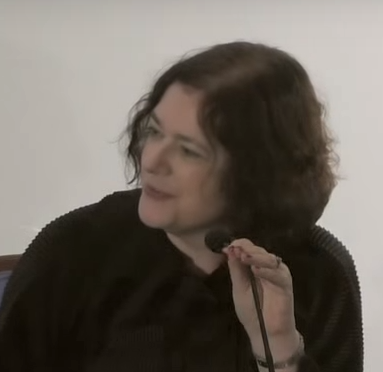
Rachel Dwyer was applauded for her writing style in the book, although she was condemned by several critics for her word-for-word translation

Yash Chopra was published by the British Film Institute in an event held in London on 29 April 2001; Amitabh Bachchan and the filmmaker Karan Johar were in the attendance. Introduced as the first book on Chopra, it has a February 2002-dated foreword written by the playback singer Lata Mangeshkar, a frequent Chopra collaborator. The book is part of the British Film Institute's "World Directors Series".^{:xii} The Indian edition, titled Yash Chopra: Fifty Years in Indian Cinema, was released by Roli Books on 30 July 2001 at an event held by the politician Sushma Swaraj in New Delhi. In an interview with the Press Trust of India, Swaraj saw it "unique" as the author is a British scholar who chose to research a well-known Indian filmmaker. An Amazon Kindle version was released on 25 July 2019.

The book received mixed response from critics. Reviewers noted Dwyer's writing and appreciated her effort to chronicle Chopra's life. However, Dwyer was panned for her way of roughly translating Chopra's interviews from Hindi and Urdu to English. Ziya Us Salam called it "a feel-good book" and said: "There is little which has historical value or even to put together memoirs but it won't leave the Chopra fans disappointed." The Hindu found Dwyer's writing "affectionate" and "unironic" instead of "dryly academic", and observed that the book helps to "[chart his] journey". Khalid Mohamed hailed Dwyer, saying she "deserves a burgundy toast at the very least for having zeroed in" on Chopra; he referred to the book as a "racy read", but added it was "ultimately shallow and unenlightening to the informed reader".

Writing for Outlook, Madhu Jain felt Dwyer detailed Chopra's life and career "in a socio-political context to talk about what was happening in Indian cinema"; Jain complained about the grammatical mistakes in the book. Rashtriya Sahara's Suvam Pal referred to the book as "effervescent", "ebullient", and "psychedelic".^{:103} Garima Pant of The Tribune wrote a scathing review: "The writer's method to throw light on the personality just through his work, and that too with only the story, crudely translated dialogues, and very few words from the man himself somehow dampens the reader's spirit." The critic from Cinemaya claimed that the writer "assiduously" examined her subject.^{:100} In 2017, in The Cinema of Bimal Roy: An 'Outsider' Within, the film scholar Shoma Chatterji criticized Yash Chopra for "objectively [labelling itself] as an honest auteur critique" and believes it lacks research relating to his film's critique.^{:25}

== Publication history ==
Region	Release date	Format
United Kingdom	29 April 2002	Hardcover
United Kingdom	29 April 2002	Paperback
United Kingdom	1 May 2002	Hardcover
United Kingdom	26 June 2002	Hardcover
United Kingdom	1 July 2002	Paperback
India	29 July 2002	Hardcover
India	29 July 2002	Paperback
United Kingdom	25 July 2019	Amazon Kindle
