= Imaandaar =

- Directed by: Sushil Malik
- Written by: Kulwant Jani (Story); Rahi Masoom Raza (dialogue); Laxmikant Sharma (Screenplay)
- Produced by: Surendra Pal Choudhary; Mrs. Sarla Sandhu
- Starring: Sanjay Dutt; Farah
- Music by: Kalyanji-Anandji
- Release date: 3 April 1987
- Running time: 152 min.
- Country: India
- Language: Hindi

Imaandaar (Hindi: ईमानदार) is a 1987 Indian Bollywood action crime drama film directed by Sushil Malik and produced by Surendra Pal Choudhary and Mrs. Sarla Sandhu. The film stars Sanjay Dutt, Farah in lead roles, along with Rohan Kapoor, Ranjeet, Mehmood, Pran, Om Prakash in supporting roles.

== Plot ==
Raju (Sanjay Dutt) has been brought up in an orphanage – Bal Mandir. Amina (Shammi) who owns a guest house, is very fond of children, but has no children of her own – so she adopts Raju and Vijay (Rohan Kapoor). Raju loves Vijay as his own brother. Vijay loves his studies and wants to fulfill his dead father's dream of becoming a chemical engineer – but lacks the necessary funds. Raju makes the noble gesture of providing him money to see him through college and sending him to London for training.

In London, Vijay meets Rai Sahab (Pran). Before Rai Sahab can get to know him – he is forced to leave London as his only daughter Renu (Farah) is ill. Renu is a stubborn girl pampered by her father. She forces her father to get her engaged to the dashing Kailash (Sumeet Saigal) the son of Ramesh Sinha (Ranjeet) who poses himself as Singhania.

== Cast ==
- Sanjay Dutt as Raju
- Farah as Renu Rai
- Rohan Kapoor as Vijay Verma
- Ranjeet as Ramesh Sinha / Singhania
- Mehmood as Tiwarilal
- Pran as Sudarshan Rai
- Om Prakash as Nath
- Shammi as Ameena
- Satyen Kappu as Dr. Saxena
- Sudhir Dalvi as Dr. Raj Bahadur Verma
- Mukri as Chef Nathulal
- Chandrashekhar as Shekhar
- Vikas Anand as Jimmy
- Dinesh Hingoo as Police Constable
- Subbiraj as Sudhir
- Sumeet Saigal as Kailash

== Soundtrack ==
No.	Title	Singer(s)	Length
1.	"Aur Is Dil Mein (Raga Charukeshi)"	Asha Bhosle
2.	"Aur Is Dil Mein (Raga Charukeshi)"	Suresh Wadkar
3.	"Ae Kaash Dil-E-Nadan"	Suresh Wadkar
4.	"Bada Shaitan Hai Dil"	Kishore Kumar
5.	"More Ghar Aaye Sajanwa, Dal Dal Kuhke Koyaliya"	Suresh Wadkar, Sadhana Sargam, Alka Yagnik
