= Woh Phir Aayegi =

1988 Hindi-language Indian horror film by B.R. Ishara

- Promotional poster
- Directed by: B.R. Ishara
- Screenplay by: B.R. Ishara; Bhushan Bhanmali
- Produced by: Pranlal Mehta; Jay Mehta
- Starring: Rajesh Khanna; Farha Naaz; Moon Moon Sen; Shekhar Suman; Javed Jaffrey; Archana Puran Singh
- Cinematography: Mrinmoy Roy W.I.C.A
- Edited by: R. Rajendran A.F.E
- Music by: Anand Milind
- Production company: Jayvijay Enterprises
- Release date: 23 September 1988
- Language: Hindi

Woh Phir Aayegi (lit. 'She will come again') is a 1988 Hindi-language Indian horror film directed by B.R. Ishara, starring Rajesh Khanna and Farha Naaz. It is a remake of 1978 Malayalam film Lisa.

== Plot ==
The film depicts the fight of Raju to free his wife Aarti from the evil spirit of Asha, who seeks revenge on her killers.

== Cast ==
- Rajesh Khanna as Raju
- Farha Naaz as Aarti
- Moon Moon Sen as Asha
- Shekhar Suman as CID Inspector Ratan
- Javed Jaffrey as Mukesh
- Archana Puran Singh as Kala
- Ashalata Wabgaonkar as Hostel Warden Sudha Verma
- Satyen Kappu as Sukhiram
- Iftekhar as Somnath
- Beena Banerjee as Lady Doctor Shanta
- Dan Dhanoa as Nand Kumar
- Yunus Parvez as Gopal
- Lilliput as Shankar
- Tiku Talsania as Mohan
- Padma Chavan as Kamla

== Soundtrack ==
Woh Phir Aayegi

Film score by Anand Milind
- Genre: Feature film soundtrack
- Label: T-Series

Lyrics: Sameer

#	Song title	Singer
1	"Kya Tan Kya Man"	S. Janaki and Amit Kumar
2	"Main Gaoon Tere Liye"	Anuradha Paudwal and Amit Kumar
3	"Pehla Pehla Pyaar Hai"	Anuradha Paudwal and Amit Kumar
4	"Bol Sakhi"	Anuradha Paudwal and Amit Kumar
5	"Woh Phir Aayegi"	Anuradha Paudwal
