= Naseeb Apna Apna (1986 film) =

- Poster
- Directed by: T. Rama Rao
- Written by: Manivannan; Mushtaq Jalili (dialogues)
- Based on: Gopurangal Saivathillai by Manivannan
- Produced by: K. C. Bokadia
- Starring: Rishi Kapoor; Farah Naaz; Radhika
- Cinematography: P. N. Sundaram
- Edited by: Swamy – Balu
- Music by: Laxmikant–Pyarelal
- Production company: BMB Combines
- Distributed by: Pen Studios
- Release date: 31 January 1986
- Country: India
- Language: Hindi

Naseeb Apna Apna (transl. To each their own fate) is a 1986 Indian Hindi-language drama film starring Rishi Kapoor, Farah Naaz and Radhika. It is a remake of the 1982 Tamil film Gopurangal Saivathillai. The film was a box office success.

== Plot ==
Chando is an innocent girl who does not look beautiful, especially with the hairstyle that makes her look facially ugly. However, her father diligently tries to find a groom for her. Kishan is a young salesman who has many dreams about his life and his life partner, but is very scared of his dominant father Bhim. Kishan's father and Chando's father Ramlal are close friends. Seeing his friend's struggle to marry off his daughter, Bhim arranges Kishan and Chando’s marriage without his consent. Kishan gets angry upon his father's decision and is further shocked to see his ugly wife-to-be Chando, who is dark skinned and lacks social graces. However, scared of his father, he reluctantly and unwillingly marries her. Kishan absolutely hates to live with Chando to the point that he doesn’t even sleep with her, but innocent Chando does not realize her husband's hatred and continues to serve her duties as a loyal wife.

Meanwhile, Kishan gets an award for best performance in his job and leaves to receive a medal. He meets an extremely beautiful and attractive woman, Radha, from Mumbai, who is also an award winner. When he returns to his office, he finds that one of his friends is transferred to Bombay, but is not willing to go. Kishan uses this opportunity to escape from his father and ugly wife and opts for the transfer to Mumbai instead of him. At Mumbai he accidentally lands up in Radha's house and stays there but never discloses that he is already married. Radha and Kishan fall in love and marry.

Kishan's father threatens his son to take Chando with him, and so Kishan unwillingly takes her with him to Bombay. But on reaching Mumbai, he finds Radha has come to receive him and leaves Chando at the railway station alone and goes away with Radha. But when he goes back to the station to find Chando, he cannot find her, but instead he meets her in his house as a maid. Chando finds that her husband has married another woman and is shocked. Chando was brought to Kishan's house by his brother-in-law Deepak. She does not tell the truth to anyone and decides to stay in their house, as a maid.

Chando and Radha become close friends; Chando teaches Radha how to be a traditional wife and soon Radha begins to see her as an elder sister. Radha also gives Chando a beautiful makeover at a ladies salon and transforms Chando into a very beautiful woman, Kishan and Deepak are surprised to see her new look. Deepak is smitten by her beauty now and plans to propose her and begins to fall in love with her for her simple and innocent nature. Kishan becomes jealous of this. Chando rejects Deepak's proposal, slapping him for his insolent behavior as she has explained how devoted she is to her husband. Chando swallows the jealousy of Radha and Kishan's relationship, continuing to be happy and serving them. Still, Radha and Deepak are unaware of the fact that Kishan and Chando are married.

Ramlal visits Bhim where he is informed that Kishan and Chando have moved to the city due to the transfer in his job. Wanting to see his daughter, Ramlal plans to visit them in Bombay and Bhim accompanies him. Chando is shocked upon seeing her father and father-in-law and takes them upstairs to Deepak's room – claiming it to be the guest room – explaining that Kishan is out of town for a few days. Kishan and Radha arrive home and Chando explains that her father and uncle have arrived to visit her and she has allowed them to stay in Deepak's room for the night. When Radha leaves, she tells Kishan it is actually his father, and her father, who are staying in his room, and hide until they leave. She promises that she'll get them out by sunrise and to trust her.

Ramlal eventually leaves the bedroom to fetch water from the kitchen. He passes Radha's bedroom where he can hear her and Kishan talking and Chando's name is mentioned. He spots a portrait of the couple outside their bedroom. Upon arrival to the kitchen, he sees his daughter laying on the floor and is shocked to see what has happened to her life. Chando assures him that she is happy and she would rather stay as a maid in this home and be close to her husband than return home with him and become a burden as well as bring shame to both families for Kishan's actions. Ramlal decides to let his daughter be and leaves with Bhim after making an excuse of having to urgently return to the village so that he doesn't learn of the truth.

Kishan overheard the conversation in the kitchen between Chando and Ramlal and is touched by her innocence and thoughtfulness. He blames himself for being a terrible husband and taking notice of beauty over personality and apologies to her. Radha then walks in, catching Chando and Kishan in an embrace.

Radha is angered and insults Chando but Kishan comes clean and explains that he is Chando's lost husband. Radha insults Kishan and goes to kill him with a knife but Chando stops her, insisting she be killed instead for ruining their happy marriage. Radha drops the knife and walks upstairs, where she shoots herself. She explains that she had a happy time living with Kishan but he belongs to Chando and asks Kishan to take good care of her elder sister. Kishan leads an extremely miserable life as he considers himself the murderer of an innocent soul.

== Cast ==
- Rishi Kapoor as Kishan Singh
- Farah Naaz as Radha Singh
- Radhika as Chando
- Amrish Puri as Bhim Singh (Kishan's father)
- Satyen Kappu as Ramlal (Chando's father)
- Seema Deo as Kishan's mother
- Rakesh Bedi as Deepak (Radha's brother)
- Y. G. Mahendran as Ram Prasad (Special appearance)
- Gulshan Kumar as Stage Chief Guest Gulshan Kumar, Super Cassettes Industries T-Series Owner (Special appearance)

== Production ==
After watching Bobby (1973) twenty-four times, Radhika agreed to play a village belle in the film and star opposite Rishi Kapoor but lamented the fact that she had to sport a weird hairdo.

== Music ==
All songs are written by S.H. Bihari.

Song	Singer
"Ek Ek Ankh Mere Sawa Sawa Lakh Ki"	Asha Bhosle
"Zindagi Ki Jhoomti Gaati Baharon Mein Sanam"	Asha Bhosle, Mohammed Aziz
"Pyar Pyar Pyar Pyar, Only Love, Only Love"	Asha Bhosle, Shabbir Kumar
"Baharon Ki Rangeeniyon Ko Churakar"	Shabbir Kumar
"Bhala Hai, Bura Hai, Jaisa Bhi Hai"	Anuradha Paudwal
"Bhala Hai, Bura Hai, Jaisa Bhi Hai" (Short)	Kavita Krishnamurthy
