= Vijetha Vikram =

- Theatrical release poster
- Directed by: S. S. Ravichandra
- Written by: Satyanand (dialogues)
- Screenplay by: S. S. Ravichandra
- Story by: Satyanand
- Produced by: T. Tirupathi Reddy
- Starring: Venkatesh; Farah
- Cinematography: Mahindar
- Edited by: Kotagiri Venkateswara Rao
- Music by: Chakravarthy
- Production company: Samyutha Arts
- Release date: 14 August 1987
- Running time: 145 minutes
- Country: India
- Language: Telugu

Vijetha Vikram (transl. Winner Vikram) is a 1987 Telugu-language film directed by S. S. Ravichandran and produced by T. Tirupathi Reddy on Samyutha Arts. It stars Venkatesh and Farah in the lead role, with music composed by Chakravarthy. The film was a flop at the box office.

== Plot ==
Rudra Bhupathi (58), a dictator of an estate, treats all the villagers as slaves. Vikram (23), a young and energetic man, enters to the estate and opposes Rudra Bhupathi's wickedness and gets closer to the villagers. Usha (21), Rudra Bhupathi's only daughter, also likes Vikram and they fall in love. A mad woman, Bharathi (49), roams all over the estate without recognizing herself, one day Vikram realises that she is his mother and there is a link between her insanity and Rudra Bhupathi. Meanwhile, Shishupal, grandson of the adjacent estate owner returns from abroad and wants to marry Usha. Seeing Vikram as an obstacle, Shishupal plans an attack on him; in that quarrel Bharathi is injured and recovers her memory. Vikram asks his mother what happened, and she discusses their past.

Vikram's father Pratap Rao 50–35 was a forest officer who obstructed Rudra Bhupathi's illegal activities in the estate, so he killed him and also tried to kill Bharathi and Vikram. In that attack, Bharathi is injured keeping Vikram in a safe place, but she lost her memory. So Vikram seeks revenge against Rudra Bhupathi. Meanwhile, Shishupal rapes a village damsel, Gowri (19), and blames it on Vikram, so everyone, including Usha, believes it because Gowri lost consciousness and is unable to recognise her rapist. Usha prepares to marry Shishupal, at the time of marriage, Rudra Bhupathi discovers that Shishipal double-crossed him, and learns that he is not the estate owner's grandson, but a local goon. Meanwhile, Gowri regains consciousness and reveals the truth and sacrifices her life to protect Vikram. Shishupal and his men attack Rudra Bhupathi and the villagers and kidnap Usha, Vikram protects her and sees the end of Shishupal, even Rudra Bhupathi admits his mistake and movie ends with the marriage of Vikram and Usha.

== Cast ==
- Venkatesh as Vikram
- Farah as Usha
- Rao Gopal Rao as Rudra Bhupathi
- Nutan Prasad as Bangaruraju
- Sudhakar as Shishupal
- Suthi Veerabhadra Rao as S.P. Pithal
- Rallapalli as Bhajagovindam
- Ranganath as Forest Officer Pratap Rao
- Vankayala Satyanarayana as Vikram's grandfather
- Chidatala Appa Rao as Villager
- Poornima as Gowri
- Sumitra as Bharathi
- Y. Vijaya as Bangari

== Soundtrack ==
Vijetha Vikram

Film score by Chakravarthy
- Released: 1987
- Genre: Soundtrack
- Length: 22:28
- Label: Lahari Music
- Producer: Chakravarthy

Chakravarthy chronology
Bharatamlo Arjunudu (1987)	Vijetha Vikram (1987)	Muddai (1987)

Music composed by Chakravarthy. Music released on Lahari Music Company.

S. No.	Song title	Singers	lyrics	length
1	"Premalo Paddavuga"	S. P. Balasubrahmanyam, P. Susheela	Veturi	4:34
2	"Ettu Ettu Ettu"	S. P. Balasubrahmanyam, P. Susheela	Veturi	4:43
3	"Kasipatnam Chooddamante"	S. P. Balasubrahmanyam, P. Susheela	Veturi	4:42
4	"Look At Me"	S. P. Balasubrahmanyam, S. Janaki	Veturi	4:32
5	"Gorinta Poddullo"	S. P. Balasubrahmanyam, P. Susheela	Vennelakanti	3:57
