= Ilanjodigal =

- Poster
- Directed by: Rama Narayanan
- Written by: Thooyavan (dialogues)
- Screenplay by: Kalaignanam
- Story by: Kalaignanam
- Produced by: N. Sakunthala
- Starring: Karthik; Suresh; Radha; Vijayashanti
- Cinematography: Lokesh
- Edited by: Gowthaman
- Music by: Shankar–Ganesh
- Production company: Bairavi Films
- Release date: 14 January 1982
- Country: India
- Language: Tamil

Ilanjodigal (transl. Young couples) is a 1982 Indian Tamil-language romantic comedy film, directed by Rama Narayanan, starring Karthik, Suresh, Radha and Vijayashanti. The film was released on 14 January 1982. It was remade in 1986 in Hindi as Love 86.

== Plot ==
Sivagami Nachiyar is an arrogant millionaire who lives with her two daughters Geetha and Sitta in her palatial, ancestral bungalow. She is extremely strict with everyone, including her two daughters, and forbids them from looking out of the house window, or even stepping out of the house. She also insults and rejects many millionaire suitors for them, which disappoints her daughters as they feel that they may not get married at all. However things take a turn when Nachiyar leaves home on an important work for ten days. Relieved, Geetha and Seeta finally venture out of the house. They run into two petty crooks, Buddy Raju and Putturaja. After some hilarious confrontations, they eventually fall in love with them. However, Nachiyar has rejected numerous millionaires themselves, so her daughters know that she will never, in her wildest dreams, accept two petty crooks as her sons-in-law.

On finding out that her daughters are in love with two hapless boys, she arranges their wedding with two princes from France. However they are none other than Buddy Raju and Putturaja in disguise. Nachiyar's brother-in-law, a gym wrestler, had planned the entire event to unite his nieces with the men they loved. After the engagement, Nachiyar find out their true identity and falsely accuses them of stealing her jewels. She quickly arranges her daughters wedding with a millionaire's sons while Buddy Raju and Putturaja are in prison.

Will Geetha and Sitta ever unite with the ones they love? Will Nachiyar ever change her ways? This forms the rest of the story. The movie puts across the quest for freedom, love and relationship in a humorous manner.

== Cast ==
- Karthik as Putturaja
- Suresh as Buddy Raju
- Radha as Sitta
- Vijayashanti as Geetha
- Rajasulochana as Nachiyar
- Goundamani as Assistant commissioner
- Kallapetti Singaram as Commissioner
- S. S. Chandran as Nachiyar's Manager
- Mani R. V. T. as Gym master and Uncle of Geetha and Sitta
- Oru Viral Krishna Rao
- Arun Pandian

== Production ==
Kalaignanam cast Karthik and Radha after being impressed with their performances in Alaigal Oivathillai (1981).

== Soundtrack ==
The soundtrack was composed by Shankar–Ganesh.

Track listing
| No. | Title | Singer(s) | Length |
|---|---|---|---|
| 1. | "Chinna Ponnu" | Malaysia Vasudevan, Vani Jairam |
| 2. | "Mami Sivagami" | S. P. Balasubrahmanyam |
| 3. | "Adi Aappakari" | Malaysia Vasudevan |
| 4. | "Thogai Pullankuzhal" | S. P. Balasubrahmanyam, S. Janaki |

== Critical reception ==
S. Shivakumar of Mid-Day criticised the film as being "full of cheap vulgarity" and felt it "deserves to be banned". Nalini Sastry of Kalki gave the film a mixed review panning the film for exaggerated humour, vulgarity in scenes, and songs.
