= Kaarnama =

Kaarnaama
- Directed by: Ranjeet
- Written by: Ranjeet
- Produced by: Ranjeet
- Starring: Vinod Khanna; Farah; Kimi Katkar
- Music by: Ravindra Jain
- Release date: 1990
- Country: India
- Language: Hindi

Kaarnaama is a 1990 Bollywood film written, produced and directed by actor Ranjeet. Kaarnaama was based on a horse race. It had a very different story line and was well made by director Ranjeet. Farha, Vinod Khanna and Amrish Puri did their best, but it was Kimi Katkar who stole the show and did extraordinary work. Cast includes Vinod Khanna, Farah, Kimi Katkar, Neena Gupta, Paintal, Nirupa Roy and Amrish Puri. Farah's role in Kaarnaama, opposite Vinod Khanna and Woh Phir Ayegi are considered her best roles ever offered to her. By that time, she had married Dara Singh's son Vindu Dara Singh.

== Cast ==
- Vinod Khanna as Suraj
- Farah as Mala
- Kimi Katkar as Jyoti
- Nirupa Roy as Savitri
- Bindu as Hitler Chachi
- Amrish Puri as Rana
- Paintal as Bhupi
- Neena Gupta as Vjyanti

== Music ==
Lyrics: Ravindra Jain

1. "Aurat" – Neena Gupta
2. "Ki Karan Dus Ki Karan" – Sushil Kumar, Asha Bhosle
3. "Kab Aankh Ladai Kab Kudi Patai" – Hemlata, Dilraj Kaur, Shabbir Kumar, Sushil Kumar
4. "Umariya Kaise Chhupayegi" – Hemlata, Dilraj Kaur, Shabbir Kumar, Sushil Kumar
