= Ranachandi =

- Directed by: G. K. Mudduraj
- Written by: S. V. Ganesh & Friends
- Screenplay by: G. K. Mudduraj
- Produced by: S. V. Ganesh & Friends
- Starring: Radha; Sarath Babu; Charanjith; Raghavi
- Cinematography: Mallikarjuna
- Edited by: S. Prasad
- Music by: Sax Raja
- Production company: Sri Durga Bhavani Art Productions
- Release date: 15 November 1991
- Country: India
- Language: Kannada

Ranachandi (Kannada: ರಣಚಂಡಿ) is a 1991 Indian Kannada film, directed by G. K. Mudduraj and produced by S. V. Ganesh & Friends. The film stars Radha, Sarath Babu, Charanjith and Raghavi in the lead roles. The film has musical score by Sax Raja.

== Cast ==
- Radha
- Sarath Babu
- Charanjith
- Raghavi
- Mukhyamantri Chandru
- Avinash
- Mysore Lokesh
- Sudheer
- Doddanna
- Umashree
- Sundar Krishna Urs
- Lohithaswa
- Master Anand
- Ramesh Bhat
- Krishne Gowda
- B. K. Shankar
- Srishailan

== Music ==
- "Naanu Yaaro" – S. P. Balasubrahmanyam, K. S. Chithra
- "Huccharu Naavu Huccharu" – S. P. Balasubrahmanyam, K. S. Chithra
- "Geetha I Love You" – S. P. Balasubrahmanyam, K. S. Chithra
- "Hididare Saarayi" – Manjula Gururaj
- "Chinna Chinna" – Manjula Gururaj
- "Naanu Yaaro" – K. S. Chithra
