= Valibamey Vaa Vaa =

1982 film by Bharathiraja

- Title card
- Directed by: Bharathiraja
- Screenplay by: Bharathiraja
- Story by: P. Kalaimani
- Produced by: S. A. Rajkannu
- Starring: Karthik; Radha
- Cinematography: B. Kannan
- Edited by: T. Thirunavukkarasu
- Music by: Ilaiyaraaja
- Production company: Sri Amman Creations
- Release date: 14 November 1982
- Country: India
- Language: Tamil

Valibamey Vaa Vaa (/vɑːlɪbəmeɪ vɑː vɑː/) is a 1982 Indian Tamil-language film directed by Bharathiraja. The film stars Karthik and Radha. It was released on 14 November 1982.

== Plot ==
Karthik is a first class graduate but innocent and unsure about the ways of the world. His mum is the principal of the girls' school where Radha studies. A brat, she is often up to pranks and is scolded by the principal. She decides to teach her a lesson by trapping her son Karthik. She runs after him trying to lure him and in this process both really fall in love. She takes him to Kodaikanal for a picnic. Various incidents make Karthik realise that she is a go getter like she bashes up a gang of goons alone. He cannot drive horses but she can etc. He starts getting doubts about his own abilities. Radha keeps on chiding him for not being man enough. Her psychiatrist father keeps warning her not do that but she does not listen to him. Karthik also visits a dancer Jayamalini to assert his manliness but she advises him to become a sage as he is not up to her expectations. He tells his mother that he is renouncing everything and a huge function is arranged to make him attain sage hood. Radha realises her mistake and goes to him as a last resort all dressed up. She entices and instigates him enough to slap her and thrust himself upon her. In the end all becomes well and Radha falls at his feet to show that he is the boss. Karthik is good as an unsure inexperienced lover. Radha shows some acting prowess and emotions in the end.

== Cast ==
- Karthik
- Radha
- Goundamani
- A. R. Subramaniam
- Lalu Alex
- Master Haja Sheriff
- Jayamalini
- Lavanya

== Production ==
Bharathiraja revealed it was Kalaimani who suggested the title Valibamey Vaa Vaa.

== Soundtrack ==
The music was composed by Ilaiyaraaja.

Song	Singers	Lyrics	Length
"Azhage Unnai"	Malaysia Vasudevan, P. Susheela	Pulamaipithan	04:02
"Ennadi Ennadi"	S. P. Sailaja	Vaali	04:11
"Kanne Balam"	K. J. Yesudas	Vairamuthu	04:19
"Pon Vaana Poongavil"	K. J. Yesudas, S. P. Sailaja	Gangai Amaran	04:14
"Vai Raja Anbu"	S. Janaki	Muthulingam	03:43
"Takkar Takkar Baby"	Malaysia Vasudevan	Vaali	

== Release and reception ==
Valibamey Vaa Vaa was released on 14 November 1982 on Diwali day alongside other releases such as [Pagadai Panirendu]] Darling, Darling, Darling, Kanmani Poonga, Agni Sakshi, Paritchaikku Neramaachu and Adhisayappiravigal. The film was not commercially successful. Kalki felt considering the plot we could have got a psychological film but not even that and the film got totally lost during the climax and concluded like how Karthik got weakened in the film looking at the glamour even Bharathiraja seems to have become the same.
