= Veeru Dada =

- Directed by: K.R. Reddy
- Written by: N.S. Bedi; S. Khan; M.D. Sunder
- Produced by: Ram Babu
- Starring: Dharmendra; Amrita Singh; Aditya Pancholi; Farha Naaz
- Cinematography: Shyam Rao Shiposkar
- Music by: Laxmikant–Pyarelal
- Release date: 27 July 1990
- Country: India
- Language: Hindi

Veeru Dada is a 1990 Indian Hindi-language film directed by K. R. Reddy and starring Dharmendra, Amrita Singh, Aditya Pancholi and Farah Naaz.

== Plot ==
Widower Chandrakant lives a poor lifestyle in India along with his daughter, Rekha, who runs a yoga class while he works as a watchman with Jaidev and his family, which consists of his wife, son, and two brothers, Mahadev and Shahdev. One night Mahadev returns home to find Jaidev and his entire family killed. He informs the police, who arrest Chandrakant and try him in court, where he is found guilty and sentenced to life in prison. Rekha then meets with wealthy Amit Anand, and both fall in love. Amit's dad wants a dowry of 50 lakh rupees, and Rekha is unable to come up with this sum. She comes to the aid of Veeru, who is on the run from the police, and a grateful Veeru makes her his sister and agrees to arrange for the dowry. Shortly thereafter, Rekha discovers that her father has escaped from prison and is in the clutches of Mahadev and Shahdev, who plan to feed him to a man-eating Cheetah. Watch what happens when Rekha finds out that Veeru was the one who handed over her dad to the two vengeful brothers.

== Cast ==
- Dharmendra as Veeru Dada
- Amrita Singh as Meena
- Aditya Pancholi as Amit Anand
- Farah as Rekha
- Shakti Kapoor as Jagraj
- Sadashiv Amrapurkar as Gul Anand
- Kulbhushan Kharbanda as Chandrakant
- Amrit Pal as Mahadev
- Anu Kapoor as Hariyali
- Gurbachan Singh as Goon

== Soundtrack ==
Song	Singer
"Banke Aaina Aa"	Sadhana Sargam
"Is Duniya Mein Jee Nahin Sakta"	Mohammed Aziz
"Maine Tujhe Dil Diya"	Sudesh Bhosle, Kavita Krishnamurthy
"Bichhu Ko Katun To"	Sudesh Bhosle
"Raat Ko Barah Baje"	Alka Yagnik
