= Halaal Ki Kamai =

Halaal Ki Kamaai
- Promotional Poster
- Directed by: Swaroop Kumar
- Produced by: Monika Padhal
- Starring: Govinda; Farah; Shakti Kapoor; Raza Murad; Gulshan Grover
- Music by: Bappi Lahiri
- Release date: 5 August 1988
- Country: India
- Language: Hindi

Halaal Ki Kamaai is a 1988 Indian Hindi-language action film directed by Swaroop Kumar, starring Govinda and Farah. The music was composed by Bappi Lahiri.

== Cast ==
- Govinda as Shankar
- Farah as Sharmili
- Shakti Kapoor as Robert
- Raza Murad as Durgadas
- Gulshan Grover as Jimmy
- Manik Irani as Fuga
- Om Prakash
- Dina Pathak
- Bhagwan Dada

== Music ==
Song	Singer
"Jo Bhi Kiya Maine Kiya Pyar Ke Liye"	Bappi Lahiri
"O Jaaneman, O Jaanejaan"	Mohammed Aziz
"Chhute Jahan Ab Tera Daaman"	Asha Bhosle
"Aankhon Mein Tu Hi Tu, Saanson Mein Tu Hi Tu"	Asha Bhosle, Shabbir Kumar
"Poochho Na Poochho"	Shabbir Kumar, Gautam Ghosh, Sapna Mukherjee
