= Majboor (1990 film) =

- Theatrical release poster
- Directed by: T. Rama Rao
- Screenplay by: Paruchuri brothers
- Dialogues by: Iqbal Durrani
- Story by: Paruchuri brothers
- Produced by: R. Joshi
- Starring: Jeetendra; Sunny Deol; Jaya Prada; Farah; Ashok Kumar
- Cinematography: V. Durga Prasad
- Edited by: J. Krishnaswamy; Balu
- Music by: Laxmikant–Pyarelal
- Production company: Bhagavati Pictures
- Release date: 9 February 1990
- Running time: 143 minutes
- Country: India
- Language: Hindi

Majboor (transl. Helpless or Commitment) is a 1990 Indian Hindi-language action film, produced by R. Joshi under the Bhagavati Pictures banner and directed by T. Rama Rao. Starring Jeetendra, Sunny Deol, Jaya Prada, Farah and Ashok Kumar in the pivotal roles and music composed by Laxmikant–Pyarelal.

== Plot ==
The film revolves around the family of Justice Dinanath, a man of integrity and a respected retired judge. He lives a peaceful life with his wife, Shanta, and their two sons: Ravi, the elder, a principled lawyer, and Sunil, the younger, a strong and honest police inspector. Sunil is in love with a beautiful girl, Priya.

The family's harmony is disrupted by Mayor Kishan Chand, a ruthless and corrupt man who uses his power to commit crimes. Both Sunil and Ravi are thorns in his side, constantly fighting his illegal activities and upholding justice. The conflict escalates when Kishan Chand's son, Teja, is caught and arrested by Inspector Sunil for molesting and murdering an employee who was Priya's friend. Lawyer Ravi takes on the case, and when Kishan Chand tries to bribe them, Justice Dinanath firmly rejects his offer, emphasizing his commitment to justice. As a result, Teja is sentenced to life imprisonment, and Kishan Chand is removed from his position as mayor. Angry with Sunil and Ravi, Kishan Chand vows to destroy their family.

Meanwhile, Ravi brings home a woman named Sharda, a former prisoner whom he wishes to marry. The family, unaware of her past, grows fond of her. However, on the day of Ravi and Sharda's wedding, a prisoner named Jankidas arrives and claims to be Sharda's husband, presenting evidence to support his claim. This revelation shocks everyone and leads to the death of Justice Dinanath. Heartbroken, Ravi and Sharda leave the family home. Jankidas continues to torment them, and in a confrontation, a henchman of his is killed. Ravi is implicated in this case.

Sunil's moral conviction is now tested as his brother, Ravi, is accused of this murder. Unaware of the true circumstances, Sunil arrests his brother, demonstrating his belief that no one is above the law. This action creates a rift within the family, but Sunil's commitment to his duty remains unshaken. It is at this point that Sharda reveals the full story. She and Ravi had been in love in college, and she had become pregnant. Jankidas, a man to whom she was indebted, forced her into a marriage to settle the debt. When she escaped to find Ravi, she was attacked by Jankidas's men, and in the ensuing fight, Ravi, badly hurt, killed one of them. To protect Ravi, Sharda took the blame and went to prison. She also reveals that her daughter, Jyoti, is Ravi's child.

Sunil learns the truth about the murder and his brother's innocence. Realizing they have been pawns in Kishan Chand's game, Sunil decides to bring the mayor and his accomplice, Jankidas, to justice. Ravi also joins Sunil to fight Kishan Chand and Jankidas. The story culminates in a final confrontation where the brothers bring the culprits to justice, and the family's harmony is restored. The family accepts Sharda, and Sunil unites with Priya.

== Cast ==
- Jeetendra as Adv Ravi Kumar – Sunil's elder brother
- Sunny Deol as Inspector Sunil Kumar – Ravi's younger brother
- Jaya Prada as Sharda – Ravi's wife
- Farah as Priya – Sunil's girlfriend
- Ashok Kumar as Justice Dinanath Kumar – Sunil and Ravi's father
- Seema Deo as Shanta – Dinanath's wife, Sunil and Ravi's mother
- Prem Chopra as Kishan Chand
- Shakti Kapoor as Jankidas
- Kader Khan in a dual role as
  - Teli Ram
  - Chameli Ram
- Mini Tabassum as Jyoti – Ravi and Sharda's daughter
- Asrani as Police Constable
- Chandrashekhar as Sevakram (Minister)
- Aruna Irani as Sharda's mother
- Johnny Lever as Quadi
- Tej Sapru as Teja – Kishanchand's son
- Kunickaa Sadanand as Sushila, Priya's friend
- Mahesh Anand as Sangram
- Yunus Parvez as Bhakti Prasad – Bar owner
- Dinesh Hingoo as Laal, Bhakti Prasad's lawyer
- Bharat Bhushan as Judge during Bhakti Prasad's case hearing
- Pinchoo Kapoor as Judge during Sharda's case Hearing
- Vikas Anand as Dr Mohan Malhotra
- Chandrashekhar Dubey as Pandit Surinder Khanna
- Kamaldeep as Village Sarpanch

== Music and soundtrack ==
The music was composed by Laxmikant-Pyarelal and the lyrics of the songs were penned by Anand Bakshi.

#	Title	Singer(s)
1	"Mere Sanam Tere Sar Ki Kasam"	Mohammed Aziz, Anuradha Paudwal
2	"Rim Jhim Barast Bahar Pani"	Mohammed Aziz, Anuradha Paudwal
3	"Krishna Govinda Murari"	Kavita Krishnamurthy
4	"Dhundo Dhundo Idhar Udhar"	Kavita Krishnamurthy
5	"Dhak Dhak Tera Dil Dhadke"	Mohammed Aziz, Anuradha Paudwal
