= Neram Vandhachu =

- Title card
- Directed by: M. Vellaisamy
- Written by: M. R. Vijay Chandar
- Produced by: S. Revathi
- Starring: Karthik; Radha
- Cinematography: J. P. Selvam
- Edited by: M. Vellaisamy
- Music by: Shankar–Ganesh
- Production company: Karthik Arts
- Release date: 4 June 1982
- Country: India
- Language: Tamil

Neram Vandhachu (transl. The time has come) is a 1982 Indian Tamil-language film directed by M. Vellaisamy. The film stars Karthik and Radha and was released on 4 June 1982.

== Plot ==
Major Kuppusamy is a wealthy millionaire but a widower. He is very strict with his daughter Radha, and enforces a military-like lifestyle on her—making her wake up very early, adhere to punctuality in even the smallest matters, and forbidding her from leaving their bungalow. One day, Kuppusamy announces Radha's marriage to Ravi (Thiagarajan), who, unbeknownst to him, is a criminal.

Disheartened, Radha runs away from home and hides in a small house to evade her pursuers. The house belongs to a quirky journalist, Raja (Karthik). Pretending to be an orphan, Radha, requests shelter from Raja. Initially hesitant, Raja eventually agrees and later falls in love with her. To win her heart, he seeks advice from Veeraiah (Karate R. V. T. Mani), a karate master. Meanwhile, Raja's press manager assigns him to find a missing girl, offering a large reward, and gives him Radha's photo. Despite this, Raja refuses to turn Radha in to her strict father and wicked fiancé, even at the cost of the reward. Touched by his sincerity, Radha realizes his true love for her, and the two decide to marry with Veeraiah's help.

Kuppusamy, on the other hand, learns from Rekha (Silk Smitha), that Ravi is a criminal who has deceived and wronged many women, including her. When Ravi and his father realize their plans have been uncovered, they conspire to trap Kuppusamy and attempt to kill Raja and Radha. Will they succeed in their wicked endeavor? Will Raja and Radha unite? And how? These questions form the rest of the story.

The film makes several references to the evergreen hit Alaigal Oivathillai and features the same lead actors. A hidden secret involving Veeraiah, Raja, Radha, and Kuppusamy is also revealed as the story unfolds.

== Cast ==
- Karthik
- Radha
- Karate Mani
- Thiagarajan
- Usharani
- Thyagu
- Thumbu
- Silk Smitha
- Gandhimathi
- Dheenaratchagan
- S. Jayaram
- M. R. Krishnasamy
- Kittu
- Uslaimani
- Bayilvan Ranganathan
- Nalla Thambi

== Production ==
R. V. Udayakumar worked as an assistant director.

== Soundtrack ==
The music was composed by Shankar–Ganesh.

Track listing
No.	Title	Lyrics	Singer(s)	Length
1.	"Thakkaali Odambu"	Mu. Metha	Malaysia Vasudevan
2.	"Panneril Neeradum Raja"	Vaali	Vani Jairam and chorus
3.	"Pillaiyare Pillaiyare"	Vaali	Malaysia Vasudevan
4.	"Kaadhal Mandhirathil"	Vaali	P. Jayachandran and Vani Jairam
