= Adhisayappiravigal =

- Theatrical release poster
- Directed by: R. Thyagarajan
- Screenplay by: Thooyavan
- Produced by: C. Dhandayuthapani
- Starring: Prabhu; Karthik; Radha
- Cinematography: V. Ramamoorthy
- Edited by: M. G. Balurao
- Music by: Shankar–Ganesh
- Production company: Devar Films
- Release date: 14 November 1982
- Country: India
- Language: Tamil

Adhisayappiravigal (transl. Extraordinary Beings) is a 1982 Indian Tamil-language masala film directed by R. Thyagarajan, starring Prabhu, Karthik and Radha. The film was released on 14 November 1982.

== Plot ==
Kathamuthu, Nallamuthu, Nachimuthu and Thangamuthu are village idiots, incapable of doing even the most basic things without their mother's guidance. She is unable to find anyone to marry them and, worried about their futures, turns to her brother Pannaiyar. He wants nothing to do with any of them but agrees to hold on to his sister's jewellery. He promises to return the jewellery to the brothers once they have settled in life. Once his sister dies, Pannaiyar decides to keep the jewellery for himself. His daughter Ponni is aware of this and, wanting to teach them responsibility, pushes the brothers to do something with their lives. Despite owning land themselves, the four choose to work for their uncle and while away their time.

Thangamuthu meets Shanthi during an accidental trip to the city and the two fall in love. Although Shanthi's inspector brother is hesitant, he ultimately relents. Thangamuthu and Shanthi marry in secret, and it is not until she goes to his home that she realises the extent of her new relatives' naivete. She takes it upon herself to teach them and soon has them farming their own lands. Slowly, they get wiser to the ways of the world. The two oldest brothers marry two sisters, Indramathi and Chandramathi. Nachimuthu and Ponni are in love as well but Pannaiyar opposes this match. Ponni tells the brothers and their wives about the stolen jewellery and comes up with a plan to get it back. Their plans cause them to clash with Pannaiyar and others set on getting the jewellery for themselves.

== Cast ==
- Karthik as Thangamuthu
- Radha as Shanthi, Thangamuthu's wife
- Prabhu as Nachimuthu
- Rajyalakshmi as Ponni, Nachimuthu's wife
- Y. G. Mahendran as Kathamuthu
- S. Ve. Shekher as Nallamuthu
- Vanitha as Indramathi, Kathamuthu's wife
- Arundhati as Chandramathi, Nallamuthu's wife
- Jaishankar as an Inspector, Shanthi's brother
- Silk Smitha as Rani, a dancer
- Pandari Bai as Lakshmi
- Thengai Srinivasan as Boothamkudi Pannaiyar, Lakshmi's brother
- Balan K. Nair as Minor
- V.Gopalakrishnan as Gopinathan, Indramathi and Chandramathi's father
- Karate Mani
- Thooyavan
- Usilai Mani

== Soundtrack ==
The music was composed by Shankar–Ganesh.

Track listing
No.	Title	Lyrics	Singer(s)	Length
1.	"Ye Pulla Rosapoo"	Vaali	S. P. Balasubrahmanyam, Vani Jairam
2.	"Ponnu Paaka Poringala"	Vaali	P. Susheela
3.	"Mogam Enakkoru Raagam"	Pulamaipithan	S. P. Balasubrahmanyam, S. P. Sailaja
4.	"Na Chinna Rani Sevantha Meni"	Vaali	Vani Jairam

== Release and reception ==
Adhisayappiravigal was released on 14 November 1982, on Diwali day alongside other releases such as Darling, Darling, Darling, Valibamey Vaa Vaa, Agni Sakshi,Pagadai Panirendu, Paritchaikku Neramaachu and Kanmani Poonga. Kalki appreciated the performances of the actors playing the four village idiots. Balumani of Anna praised the acting of cast, cinematography and praised director Thyagarajan for making a humorous film without making it boring.
