= Sakthi (1983 film) =

1983 Indian Telugu film by K. Raghavendra Rao

- Directed by: K. Raghavendra Rao
- Starring: Krishna; Jayasudha; Radha
- Music by: Chakravarthy
- Production company: Gopi Movies
- Release date: 2 September 1983
- Country: India
- Language: Telugu

Sakthi (transl. Power) is a 1983 Indian Telugu-language action drama film directed by K. Raghavendra Rao for Gopi Movies starring Krishna, Radha, Jayasudha and Rao Gopala Rao. Chakravarthy scored and composed the film's soundtrack. The film was declared a Blockbuster at the box office.

The film set on a village backdrop featured Krishna in dual roles as Ramu and Krishna. The film marked the fifth collaboration of Raghavendra Rao with Krishna after Bhale Krishnudu, Gharana Donga, Ooriki Monagadu and Adavi Simhalu.

The film was remade in Hindi as Kaamyab.

== Cast ==
- Krishna as Ramu and Krishna
- Jayasudha as Seeta
- Radha
- Rao Gopala Rao as Chinthapikkala Narasaraju
- Allu Ramalingaiah
- Giribabu as Giri
- Kanta Rao
- Prabhakar Reddy as P. K. Bir
- Mada as Narasaraju's son
- Chalapathi Rao as Bhimudu
- Potti Prasad
- Sarathi as Inspector
- P. J. Sarma
- Subha
- Annapoorna
- Nirmalamma
- Chidathala Appa Rao as Constable

== Soundtrack ==
Song	Singer(s)
"Andhamantha"	S. P. B., P. Susheela
"Seetha Raamulu"	S. P. B., P. Susheela
"Are Chikkindamma"	S. P. B., P. Susheela
"Maa Naela Talli"	S. P. B., P. Susheela
"Ittaage Ittaage"	S. P. Balasubrahmanyam, P. Susheela
"Moggalanti"	S. P. B., P. Susheela

== Release and Reception ==
The film was released on 2 September 1983 to positive reviews. The film had a theatrical run of 48 days in Hyderabad, 100 days in Vizag, 100 days in Nellore and 100 days in Guntur.
