= Rachel Dwyer =

Professor and non-fiction writer from London

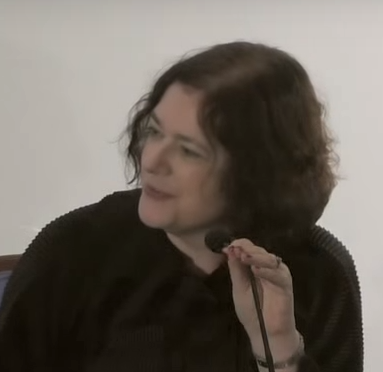
Prof Rachel Dwyer at SOAS

Rachel Dwyer is a professor of Indian Cultures and Cinema at SOAS, University of London.

== Life ==
Dwyer took her BA in Sanskrit at SOAS, followed by an MPhil in General Linguistics and Comparative Philology at the University of Oxford. Her PhD research was on the Gujarati lyrics of Dayaram (1777-1852). She has published several books on Indian cinema.

== Bibliography ==
- 2014 — Picture abhi baaki hai: Bollywood as a guide to modern India. New Delhi: Hachette.
- 2014 — Bollywood’s India: Hindi cinema as a guide to contemporary India. London/Chicago: Reaktion Books.
- 2013 — Get started in Gujarati (Teach Yourself Language) London: Teach Yourself/Hodder.
- 2008 — What do Hindus Believe? London: Granta.
- 2006 — Filming the Gods: Religion and Indian Cinema. London, New York and New Delhi: Routledge (Sections reprinted in Brent Plate and Jolyon Mitchell (eds), The Religion and Film Reader. London: Routledge, pp135–42.
- 2005 — 100 Bollywood Films. London: British Film Institute.
- 2002 — Rachel Dwyer & Divia Patel, Cinema India: The Visual Culture of Hindi Film. London: Reaktion.
- 2002 — Yash Chopra. London: British Film Institute
- 2000 — All You Want is Money, All You Need is Love. London: Continuum.
- 2000 — The Poetics of Devotion: The Gujarati Lyrics of Dayaram. London: Routledge (London Studies on South Asia, 19).
- 1995 — Gujarati (Teach Yourself). New Delhi: Hachette India.

=== Edited books ===
- 2015 — Key concepts in modern Indian studies. New Delhi/New York: Oxford University Press/New York University Press.
- 2015 — Bollywood. London: Routledge. (Critical concepts in media and cultural studies)
- 2011 — Rachel Dwyer & Jerry Pinto (eds), Beyond the Boundaries of Bollywood: The Many Forms of Hindi Cinema. New Delhi: Oxford University Press.
- 2000 — Rachel Dwyer & Christopher Pinney (eds), Pleasure and the Nation: The History, Politics and Consumption of Popular Culture in India. New Delhi: Oxford University Press (SOAS Studies on South Asia).
