= Love 86 =

- Film poster
- Directed by: Esmayeel Shroff
- Written by: Moin-ud-din
- Based on: Ilanjodigal by Kalaignanam
- Produced by: Pranlal V. Mehta
- Starring: Govinda; Neelam; Farha Naaz; Rohan Kapoor; Tanuja
- Cinematography: Russi Billimoria
- Edited by: A.R. Rajendran
- Music by: Laxmikant Pyarelal
- Release date: 14 February 1986
- Country: India
- Language: Hindi

Love 86 is a 1986 Bollywood romantic drama film directed by Esmayeel Shroff, starring Govinda, Neelam, Farha Naaz, Rohan Kapoor, and Tanuja. It was a remake of the 1982 Tamil film Ilanjodigal. This was Govinda's debut movie.

== Cast ==
- Govinda as Vicky
- Neelam as Esha
- Farha Naaz as Leena
- Rohan Kapoor as Omi
- Tanuja as Laxmidevi
- Shafi Inamdar as Ramniwas Tilak
- Satish Shah as Havaldar Sandu
- Ravi Baswani as Havaldar Pandu
- Johnny Lever as Uttam
- Asrani as Hanuman
- Birbal
- Dinesh Hingoo as Surendra Nath
- Rita Rani Kaul as Mrs. Surendra Nath
- Guddi Maruti
- Anjan Srivastav as Dr. Dilip Sen

== Plot ==
Laxmidevi, a strict disciplinarian, wants her daughters, Leena and Esha, to marry brothers from a wealthy family, so that both girls can stay in the same household. But Leena and Esha fall in love with Omiand Vicky respectively. The boys are poor orphans who have taken to petty crimes in order to survive. How the matter is resolved forms the rest of the story.

== Music ==
Track list
No.	Title	Lyrics	Singer(s)	Length
1.	"O Miss De De Kiss"	Prem Pandit	Suresh Wadkar, Shailendra Singh	04:57
2.	"Main Jab Bhi"	S.H. Bihari	Shabbir Kumar, Kavita Krishnamurthy	04:42
3.	"Pyar Ki Had Se"	Santosh Anand	Mohammed Aziz, Kavita Krishnamurthy	05:36
4.	"Mehboob Se Hamare"	S.H. Bihari	Mohammed Aziz, Kavita Krishnamurthy	07:08
5.	"Aayee Hai Barat"	S.H. Bihari	Shabbir Kumar, Suresh Wadkar	05:53
6.	"Kismat Apni Khul Gayi"	Sameer	Hemlata, Anuradha Paudwal	05:25
