= Ghar Ghar Ki Kahani (1988 film) =

- Directed by: Kalpataru
- Written by: Kader Khan (dialogues); Keshav Rathod (screenplay)
- Story by: Palagummi Padmaraju
- Based on: Santhi Nivasam (Telugu)
- Produced by: Jawaharlal Bafna; Vasant Doshi
- Starring: Rishi Kapoor; Jaya Prada; Govinda; Farah Naaz; Kader Khan; Ashok Saraf
- Music by: Bappi Lahiri
- Release date: 30 June 1988
- Country: India
- Language: Hindi
- Budget: ₹1.8 crores
- Box office: est. ₹8 crores Worldwide

Ghar Ghar Ki Kahani (transl. The story of every house) is a 1988 Hindi-language drama film directed by Kalpataru. The film stars Rishi Kapoor, Jaya Prada, Anita Raj, Govinda, Farah Naaz in lead roles. The film performed well on box office and was declared a hit. This film was a remake of Telugu film Santhi Nivasam.

== Plot ==
The plot centres on the Dhanraj family. Mr Dhanraj and his wife are extremely wealthy and live in a huge house with their children and their spouses. The family includes Ganga, the widow of their eldest son, and her two children; their second son, Ram, and his wife, Sita; their third son, Amar; and their daughter, Uma. Uma is married to Lallu but refuses to live with him because he is poor, so Lallu has ended up becoming a ghar jamai. Mrs Dhanraj is extremely bad-tempered and is frequently violent towards her daughters-in-law. One day, Amar meets a beautiful girl named Asha, and the two fall in love. Asha has problems of her own, as her sister-in-law treats her very badly.

Amar decides not to tell anyone in his family about Asha for fear of his mother creating a ruckus. However, he confides in Sita, since he is very close to her and treats her like his mother. Uma overhears them talking and decides to instigate her brother Ram against Sita by suggesting that Amar and Sita are having an affair. Ram starts spying on the two of them. Amar and Sita are very secretive because they are trying to figure out how to get Amar and Asha married. Ram interprets their actions as proof of an affair. He continues to believe that Sita is cheating on him even after Amar and Asha get married. One night, he gets drunk at a hotel and is rescued by a friend, Deepa. Deepa is a doctor, and when she finds out that Ram is suicidal, she decides to help him. She realises that Ram has started liking her, but she decides not to rebuff him until he is feeling better. Ram starts spending most of his time away from home. When Sita becomes pregnant, he assumes that the child belongs to Amar.

Meanwhile, Asha decides that she is not going to tolerate Mrs Dhanraj's violence. When Mrs Dhanraj tries to beat her, Asha breaks her stick in two. Later, Amar and Mr Dhanraj conspire to get Uma to move to her husband's house. Amar inspires Mr Dhanraj to assume leadership of the household in order to save everyone from Mrs Dhanraj's cruelty. Mr Dhanraj rises to the occasion by beating his wife while the rest of the family applauds.

Ram asks Deepa to marry him, and she asks him to give her some time to think it over. She goes to visit Sita and tells her that her husband is cheating on her. Ram returns home, accuses Sita of infidelity, and asks her to sign divorce papers. When she refuses, he storms out and goes to Deepa's house. However, when she refuses to marry him, he becomes violent and threatens to kill her, though he eventually calms down and leaves. Amar confronts him and begs him to come home. A fight breaks out when Ram accuses Amar of having an affair with Sita. Mr and Mrs Dhanraj, Asha, Uma, and Lallu arrive and separate them. Uma then confesses that she tried to instigate Ram against Sita and that she had stolen a necklace that Ram had given to Sita. Asha explains that Amar and Sita had gone to a park not to spend time together, but so that Sita could meet Asha. Ram realises his mistake and rushes home to find Sita on the brink of suicide. He manages to save her, and the family is reunited in the end.

== Cast ==
- Rishi Kapoor as Ram Dhanraj
- Jaya Prada as Seeta
- Anita Raj as Deepa
- Govinda as Amar
- Farah as Asha
- Kader Khan as Dhanraj
- Shashikala as Mrs. Dhanraj
- Ashok Saraf as Lallu Lal
- Aruna Irani as Uma
- Padma Khanna as Ganga

== Soundtrack ==
The music for all the songs were composed by Bappi Lahiri and lyrics were written by Majrooh Sultanpuri, Anjaan and Indeevar.

Song	Singer
"De Tulsi Maiya"	Anupama Deshpande
"De Tulsi Maiya" (Sad)	Anupama Deshpande
"Kitne Mausam Kitne Sawan"	Anupama Deshpande, Mohammed Aziz
"Dulhe Raja Ki Soorat Dekho"	Alka Yagnik, Usha Mangeshkar
"Hello Darling"	Shabbir Kumar, Chandrani Mukherjee
"Dadi Maa Dadi Maa"	Shabbir Kumar, Chandrani Mukherjee, Uttara Kelkar
"Noorjehan Tu Kahan"	Asha Bhosle, Bappi Lahiri
"Kisi Se Jab Pyar Hua"	Asha Bhosle
