= Faasle =

- Directed by: Yash Chopra
- Written by: Sachin Bhowmick
- Produced by: Yash Chopra
- Starring: Sunil Dutt; Rekha; Farooq Shaikh; Deepti Naval; Rohan Kapoor; Farah; Raj Kiran
- Cinematography: Manmohan Singh
- Edited by: Keshav Naidu
- Music by: Shiv-Hari
- Production company: Yash Raj Films
- Release date: 27 September 1985
- Country: India
- Language: Hindi

Faasle is a 1985 Indian film produced and directed by Yash Chopra, starring Sunil Dutt, Rekha, Farooq Shaikh, Deepti Naval, Rohan Kapoor, Farah, Raj Kiran, Sushma Seth and Aloknath. The film marks the debut film for Rohan Kapoor, son of singer Mahendra Kapoor and actress Farah, niece of Shabana Azmi. The film's music was composed by Shiv-Hari with lyrics by Shahryar. This film was panned by the critics for bad storyline and editing.

== Plot ==
Vikram is proud and wealthy. His wife having died young, Vikram has brought up his son Sanjay and daughter Chandni, sacrificing his own personal happiness, choosing a secret relationship over marriage, with Maya. He dotes upon his children and is very protective about his daughter.

When Vijay comes into Chandni's life and steals her heart - they realize the course of true love never runs smooth and her father's disapproval and her impending arranged marriage threatens the love between Chandni and Vijay.

Faasle is a story about the blind sense of duty inculcated by the older generation and the self-confidence and arrogance of the youth, it is a story of everyone doing what they believe to be right, all in the name of Love.

== Cast ==
- Sunil Dutt as Vikram
- Rekha as Maya
- Farooq Shaikh as Sanjay
- Deepti Naval as Sheetal
- Rohan Kapoor as Vijay
- Farah as Chandni
- Raj Kiran as Shivraj Gupta
- Daljeet Kaur as Shivraj's Sister-in-law
- Ajit Singh Deol as Veer
- Damyanti Puri as Veer's wife
- Huma Khan as dancer
- Sushma Seth as Shivraj's eldest sister-in-law
- Javed Khan as Nandu
- Aloknath as Shivraj's Handicapped Brother

== Soundtrack ==
The music was composed by Shiv-Hari with the lyrics penned by Shahryar.

Song	Singer
"Chandni Tu Hai Kahan"	Kishore Kumar, Lata Mangeshkar
"In Aankhon Ke Zeenon Se"	Kishore Kumar, Lata Mangeshkar
"Janam Janam Mere Sanam"	Kishore Kumar, Lata Mangeshkar
"Hum Chup Hain" (Duet)	Kishore Kumar, Lata Mangeshkar
"Hum Chup Hain" (Solo)	Lata Mangeshkar
"Sun Le Yeh Sara Zamana"	Lata Mangeshkar
"Faasle Hai Bahut"	Asha Bhosle
"Yeh Kafile Yaadon Ke"	Asha Bhosle
"Mora Banna Dulhan Leke Aaya"	Pamela Chopra, Shobha Gurtu
