= Rohan Kapoor (actor) =

Indian actor

Rohan Kapoor/Ruhan Kapoor
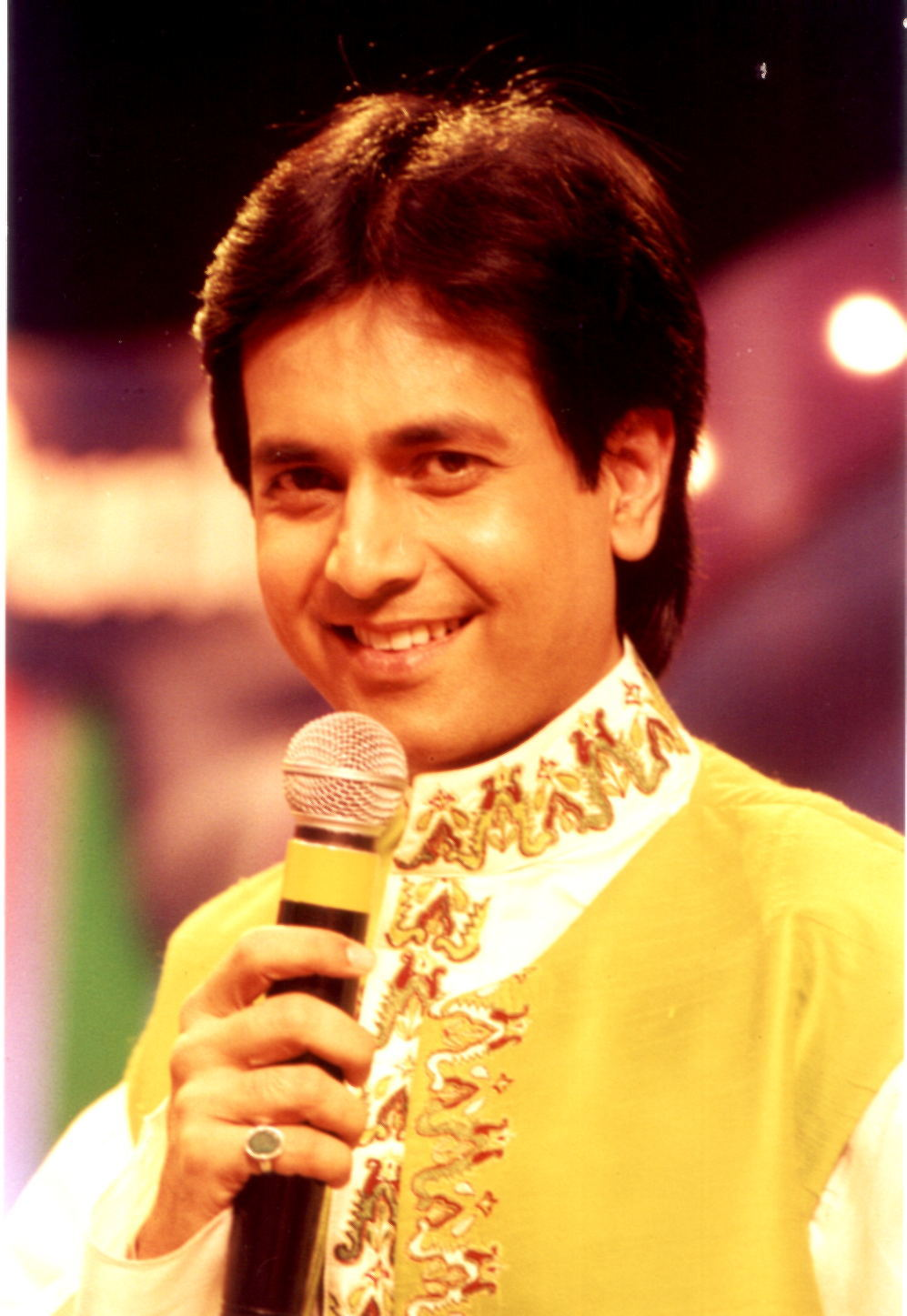
- Ruhan Kapoor
- Born: 1965 (age 60–61); Mumbai
- Other name: Ruhan Kapoor
- Occupations: Actor, singer
- Years active: 1981–present
- Parent: Mahendra Kapoor (Father)
- Website: www.ruhankapoor.com

Rohan Kapoor (or Ruhan Kapoor, born 1965) is an India actor and singer, son of Mahendra Kapoor. He started his film career at the age of 16 as an assistant director with Manoj Kumar for the film Kranti. After that, he became active on the stage with Shafi Inamdar and even acted for two of his most popular plays – Neela Kamra and Adaa. Yash Chopra gave a break to Rohan as a hero in his film Faasle with Farha in the year 1985, then he had a role in Love 86, in which Govinda co-starred with Rohan. After that, Prakash Mehra got Rohan to play in Imaandaar in deference to his earlier role with Shafi Inamdar and Sanjay Dutt, which earned Rohan much critical acclaim from the media as well as moviegoers. Then, many other roles came, including Masti, Mera Naseeb, Maha Kali, and Sur Asur.

He also started his singing career at the age of nine; he toured the world with his father singing on stage. Then, Rohan made the pop albums Oh My Darling, Dil Tera Diwana and Ishq Rab Ki Dua.

== Selected filmography ==
Year	Film	Role	Notes
1981	Kranti		Assistant director
1985	Faasle	Vijay	
1986	Love 86	Omi	
1987	Imaandaar	Vijay 'Viju' R. Verma	
1989	Wohi Bhayanak Raat		
