= Nitish Bharadwaj =

Indian actor (born 1963)

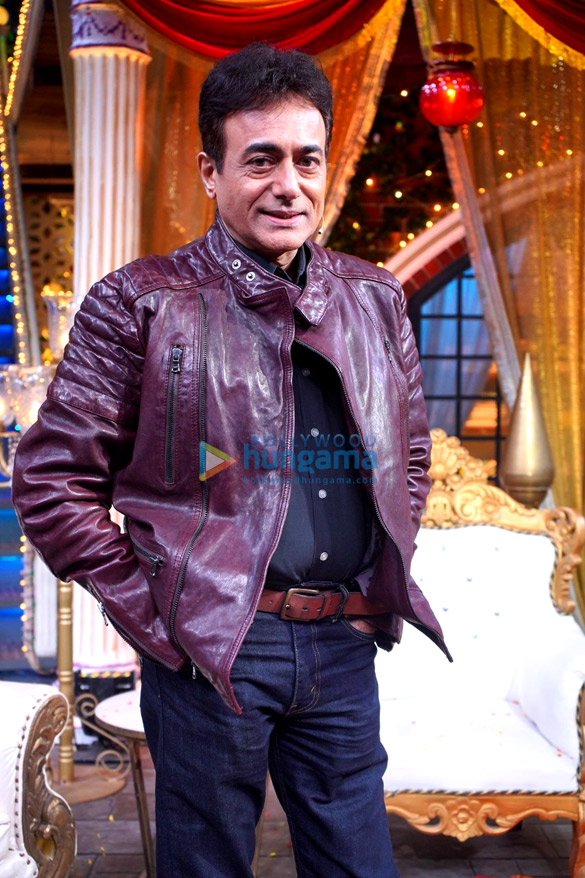
- Bhardwaj in 2020

Member of Parliament, Lok Sabha
- In office 1996–1998
- Preceded by: Shailendra Mahato
- Succeeded by: Abha Mahato
- Constituency: Jamshedpur

Personal details
- Born: 2 June 1963 (age 63) Bombay, Maharashtra, India
- Spouses: Monisha Patil (m. 1991; div. 2005) Smita Gate (m. 2009; sep. 2019)
- Children: 4
- Occupation: Actor; director; producer; screenwriter

Nitish Bharadwaj (born 2 June 1962) is an Indian television and film actor, director, screenwriter, film and TV programme producer, veterinary science graduate from Mumbai Veterinary college and former Member of Parliament in Lok Sabha. He is best known for his role as Krishna in B. R. Chopra's television series Mahabharat, as well as for his portrayal of Vishnu and several avatars of Vishnu in some of Chopra's other great works, such as Vishnu Puran. His debut directorial film in Marathi titled Pitruroon won accolades from audiences and critics. He now focuses on his film career entirely through screenwriting, directing and dancing.

== Career ==
=== Theatre and radio ===
Before coming into the field of acting, Bharadwaj was a professional veterinary surgeon and had worked as an assistant veterinarian at a Race Course in Mumbai; however, he left the job considering it a monotonous one. He started his arts career with his training in Marathi theatre as a director, under stalwarts such as Sudha Karmarkar, Dr. Kashinath Ghanekar and Prabhakar Panshikar. He then moved on to professional Marathi theatre with Sai Paranjapye and later shifted to Hindi theatre on sound advice from his friend Ravi Baswani. Baswani was instrumental in getting Bharadwaj from Marathi to the nationwide Hindi arena and Bharadwaj has always acknowledged Baswani's contribution to his life. He worked with a thespian of Hindi theatre named Dinesh Thakur and performed in many of his plays till 1987. He later did a Hindi play Chakravyuh, in which he reappears as Krishna, the role he mastered in the old Mahabharat.

Bharadwaj also did 2 radio shows for BBC Radio 4 (London, UK), namely Bhagvad Geeta and Ramayan. He was nominated for the "Sony Radio award" for Ramayan in the UK in 1995.

=== Television career ===
In 1988 Bharadwaj was selected to play the lead role of Krishna in B. R. Chopra's classic television series Mahabharat. He played the role at the age of 23 and became an overnight star. His performance was loved and appreciated by audience. He also did a cameo in the show Buniyaad's episode 51.

He directed a philosophical TV series titled Gita Rahasya, Apraadhi for Star TV and a few documentary films.

In 2000, Bharadwaj appeared in B.R. Chopra's another mythological show Vishnu Puran, where he played role of Vishnu and his various incarnations. In 2001 he played the role of Rama in Chopra's Ramayan with Smriti Malhotra Irani.

=== Film career ===
Bharadwaj starred as the Main Lead in many Marathi movies such as Khatyal Sasu Nathal Soon, Nasheebwan, Anapekshit, Pasanta Ahe Mulgi, Trishagni (with Nana Patekar) and the highly acclaimed Malayalam movie Njan Gandharvan, (1991) directed by P. Padmarajan. After Njan Gandharvan, Padmarajan was planning a film with Mohanlal and Bharadwaj in lead roles, but he died before it could materialise. In a later interview in 2019, Bharadwaj said that, if that film had happened, he might have settled in Kerala. He judged a Marathi dance reality show on ETV Marathi; Jallosh Survanayugacha, with Sudha Chandran and Ramesh Deo.

Bharadwaj made his film direction debut in 2013 with a Marathi film starring Tanuja, Suhas Joshi and Sachin Khedekar titled Pitruroon. The film is based on a novella by Sudha Murthy. The film was acclaimed by both the critics and audiences. Pitruroon received many nominations and awards, and also gave Bharadwaj the Maharashtra State Film Award as the second Best Director of 2013. Recently in 2020 he appeared on screen as a Sudarshan Chakrapani in a Marathi web series Samantar which was telecasted on mx player. Bharadwaj has also played important roles in movies including Mohenjo Daro and Kedarnath.

== Politics ==
Bharadwaj contested the parliamentary elections from Jamshedpur in Jharkhand and Rajgarh (in Madhya Pradesh) as a Bharatiya Janata Party (BJP) candidate and was elected to Lok Sabha as a Member of Parliament from Jamshedpur in 1996 election, by defeating veteran Inder Singh Namdhari. He lost to Laxman Singh (brother of then chief minister of Madhya Pradesh, Digvijaya Singh) from Rajgarh constituency in the 1999 Lok Sabha election. He also worked in BJP's organisational unit of Madhya Pradesh and was also its Spokesperson for a while, till he voluntarily retired from active politics to focus on his film career as a screenwriter and film director.

== Personal life ==
In 1991, Bharadwaj married Monisha Patil, daughter of Vimla Patil, then editor of Femina. They have two children, a son and daughter and divorced in 2005.

== Filmography ==
=== Acting roles ===
- Trishagni (1988) (with Nana Patekar)
- Njan Gandharvan (1991) Malayalam, (with Suparna Anand)
- Sangeet (1992) (with Madhuri Dixit)
- Gruhpravesh (1992) (with Nishigandha Wad)
- Soona Ani Mona (1992) (with Varsha Usgaonkar)
- Prem Daan (1991) (with Khushbu Sundar)
- Anpekshit (1991 (with Archana Joglekar)
- Prem Shakti (1994) (with Govinda, Karishma Kapoor)
- Nache Nagin Gali Gali (1989) (with Meenakshi Seshadri)
- Navra Baiko (1989) (with Ashok Saraf)
- Khatyal Sasu Nathal Soon (1987) with Varsha Usgaonkar
- Abhishek (1987) (with Aditya Pancholi)
- Pasant Aahe Mulgi (1989) (with Varsha Usgaonkar)
- Tujhi Majhi Jamli Jodi (1990) (with Nivedita Joshi)
- Nashibwaan (1988) (with Alka Kubal)
- Pitruroon (2013) (Writer/Director)
- Mahabharat Aur Barbareek (2013) as Krishna
- Mohenjo Daro (2016) as Durjan (with Hrithik Roshan)
- Yaksh (2018) as Yaksh
- Kedarnath (2018) as Brijraj Mishra (with Sushant Singh Rajput)
- Kathanar – The Wild Sorcerer (2026) (Malayalam) Upcoming

=== Television ===
- Mahabharat (1988) as Krishna
- Saare Sapney Kahin Kho Gaye (1995)
- Geeta Rahasya (1999) (producer-Director-Co writer) (with Irrfan Khan)
- Ramayan (2001-2002) as Rama
- Vishnu Puran (2003) as Vishnu / Vamana / Parashurama / Rama / Krishna
- Man Mein Hai Visshwas (2006-2007, presenter)
- Ajab Gajab Ghar Jamai (2014, Krishna)
- Kesariya@100 (2025, presenter)

=== Web series ===
- Samantar - in as Sudarshan Chakrapani (MX Player Originals) (2020)
- Samantar season 2 - in as Sudarshan Chakrapani (MX Player Originals) (2021)

== Awards ==
- Best Screenplay Writer for Marathi feature film, Pitruroon, Sahyadri Film Awards, 2014
- Nominated – Best Actor for Pitruroon, Screen Awards, 2014
- 2nd Best Director for Pitruroon, Maharashtra State Film Awards, 2014

== See also ==
- List of Indian television actors
