= Aatank Hi Aatank =

- Release poster
- Directed by: Dilip Shankar
- Written by: Dilip Shankar
- Produced by: Xavier Marquis (Presenter); Mangal
- Starring: Rajinikanth; Aamir Khan; Juhi Chawla
- Cinematography: Ashok Gunjal
- Edited by: Dilip Shankar
- Music by: Bappi Lahiri
- Production company: Suyash Films Pvt.Ltd
- Distributed by: Goldmines Media
- Release date: 4 August 1995
- Running time: 155 minutes
- Country: India
- Language: Hindi

Aatank Hi Aatank (transl. Terror Everywhere) is a 1995 Indian Hindi-language action crime film written, edited and directed by Dilip Shankar. Highly inspired by The Godfather, it stars Rajinikanth, Aamir Khan, Juhi Chawla and Archana Joglekar.

Released on 4 August 1995, the film was a box office failure. Khan eventually regretted doing the film and disliked his own performance. The movie was later re-shot in Tamil with an added track featuring Ponvannan and Vadivukkarasi as Aandavan released in 2000.

== Plot ==
Shiv Charan Sharma, a farmer, moves to the city to make a life with his son Rohan, daughter Radha Seth and his wife. He meets Munna, an orphan. Shiv and Munna work hard in the underbelly of the city outside the law and go on to lead a syndicate of gangsters. Years pass by, and Shiv Charan Sharma is shown to have become an untouchable gang lord. Aslam Pathan and Billa Singh Thakur, rival crime bosses, try to kill Shiv in hopes of overtaking his territory and get rid of the opposition he was proving to be in their plans to increase drug traffic within the city.

Munna, meanwhile, falls in love with Razia, who is the daughter of Aslam Pathan. She elopes with Munna and gets married. Aslam Pathan attempts to get back at the father of the groom, by sending Gogia Advani to Shiv Charan Sharma with a drug proposition as he thinks that Shiv's acceptance of Gogia's offer would create dissent amongst the crime circles. Shiv Charan Sharma refuses, but Munna seems interested.

Shiv Charan Sharma gets shot by goons hired by Pathan and Thakur. They think that Munna will follow up on the drug deal if the father is out of the picture. However, the father survives. At this point, Rohan enters the picture with his girlfriend, Neha. He has kept away from the family business until this point. Rohan then avenges his father's shooting by taking out Gogia Advani with Munna's help. Following the shooting, Rohan is on the run, where he meets Ganga, whom he falls for too. Four years later, Rohan becomes the crime boss. In the end, Sharad Joshi takes a contract from Aslam Pathan and Billa Singh Thakur to kill Shiv, Charan Sharma, and Munna. It is to be seen how Rohan protects his brother and his father.

== Cast ==
- Rajinikanth as Munna
- Aamir Khan as Rohan Singh Thakur
- Juhi Chawla as Neha
- Om Puri as Sharad Joshi
- Dalip Tahil as Robert
- Raza Murad as Aslam Pathan
- Goga Kapoor as Billa Singh Thakur
- Ishrat Ali as Shiv Charan Sharma
- Rita Bhaduri as Mrs. Shivcharan Sharma
- Suhas Joshi as Mrs. Aslam Pathan
- Archana Joglekar as Razia Pathan
- Chandrashekhar Dubey as Durga Prasad Tiwari
- Kabir Bedi as Police Inspector Dharam Dayal
- Pooja Bedi as Ganga
- Radha Seth as Anju
- Firoz Irani as Masood Patel
- C. S. Dubey as Durga Prasad Tiwari
- Vikas Anand as Mahesh
- Girja Shankar as Raka
- Bharat Kapoor as Gogia Adwani
- Joginder as Police Commissioner Hakim Singh
- Amrit Pal as Zamindar Deva Singh
- Ram Mohan as Thakur Babu Singh
- Sameer Khakhar as Mahendra
- Ponvannan (Partial version in Tamil)
- Vadivukkarasi (Partial version in Tamil)

== Music ==
All music is composed by Bappi Lahiri.

No.	Title	Lyrics	Singer(s)	Length
1.	"O Meri Jane Jigar"	Naqsh Lyallpuri, Anwar Sagar, Sanam Ghazipuri	Kumar Sanu	7:06
2.	"Mohabbat Mitt Nahin Sakti"		Kavita Krishnamurthy
3.	"Aakha Hai Bombai"		Aparna Jha, Udit Narayan, Mohammed Aziz, Babla Mehta
4.	"Ek Dujhe Pe Marne Wale Nahi Kisi Se Darne Wale"		Alka Yagnik, Bappi Lahiri
5.	"Gunda Rap"		Bali Brahmbhatt, Arpita Raaj
6.	"Tere Siva Kaun Hai Mera"		Sadhana Sargam
