= Bandhan (1991 film) =

Bandhan - Marathi Movie
- Theatrical release poster
- Directed by: Anant Mane
- Screenplay by: Anant Mane; Ashok Patole
- Produced by: Chelaram Bhatia; Lalchand Bhatia
- Starring: Ajinkya Deo; Nishigandha Wad; Ramesh Bhatkar; Asha Kale; Vasant Shinde; Sharad Talwalkar; Nandini Jog
- Cinematography: Vasant Shinde
- Edited by: Duttaram Tavde
- Music by: Anil Mohile
- Release date: 5 March 1991
- Country: India
- Language: Marathi

Bandhan is a 1991 Indian Marathi-language Romantic Drama film directed by Anant Mane and produced by Chelaram Bhatia and Lalchand Bhatia under the banner of Glamour Films, featuring Ajinkya Deo, Nishigandha Wad, Asha Kale, Ramesh Bhatkar and Sharad Talwalkar. Nishigandha Wad and Ajinkya Deo appeared together for the first time in the film, where a headstrong girl marries the young boy to quell his spirit and teach him a lesson. In the process, she ends up learning a few lessons herself. It was released on 5 March 1991.

== Cast ==
- Ajinkya Deo as Mohan
- Nishigandha Wad as Pramila Jhadav
- Ramesh Bhatkar as Doctor
- Asha Kale as Janki (Jhonny)
- Ashok Pahelwan as Goon
- Vasant Shinde
- Sharad Talvalkar as Anna Jhadav
- Nandini Jog as Nandini
- Dinkar Inamadar as Madhoo
- Alka Inamadar as Rakhma
- Bhalchandra Kulkarni

== Soundtrack ==
Bandhan

Soundtrack album by Anil Mohile
- Released: 1991
- Genre: Feature film soundtrack
- Length: 28:03
- Language: Marathi

The music is composed by Anil Mohile The music has been provided by Anil Mohile. Lyrics written by Jagdish Khebudkar.

=== Track listing ===
No.	Title	Performer(s)	Length
1.	"Satyavan Savitrichi Katha"	Jyotsna Hardikar	5:08
2.	"Jhimma Jhimma Pori"	Anupama Deshpande, Pradnya khanekar, Jyotsna Hardikar	6:41
3.	"Majha Sajana"	Anupama Deshpande, Sudesh Bhosle	5:43
4.	"Naravina Naricha"	Ravindra Sathe	5:46
5.	"Radu Nako"	Ravindra Sathe	5:25
