= Seema Deo =

Indian actress (1942–2023)

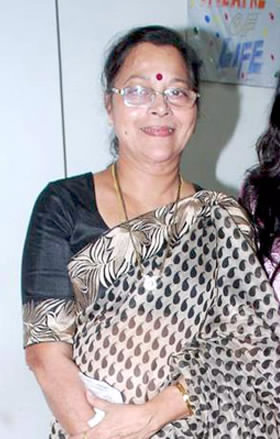
- Deo in 2010
- Born: Nalini Saraf; 27 March 1942; Girgaum, Bombay, Bombay Province, British India
- Died: 24 August 2023 (aged 81); Bandra, Mumbai, Maharashtra, India
- Occupation: Actress
- Years active: 1960–2023
- Spouse: Ramesh Deo (m. 1963; died 2022)
- Children: 2
- Family: Deo family

Seema Deo (27 March 1942 – 24 August 2023) was an Indian Hindi and Marathi film actress. She appeared in over 80 Marathi and Hindi films. She won Maharashtra State Film Award for Best Actress for the film Pahu Re Kiti Vaat.

== Early life ==
Seema was born as Nalini Saraf on 27 March 1942 into a family residing in a small ten-by-fourteen-foot tenement in the Girgaon neighborhood of Mumbai. She was the youngest of four siblings, having three sisters and one brother. Her father was an employee at the Golden Tobacco Company. During her childhood, the family faced financial challenges, and the responsibility for supporting the household eventually fell upon her mother. Once the family achieved a degree of financial stability, her mother encouraged her to pursue the arts. Although she initially considered training in Kathak, she transitioned toward performing in ballets. At the age of nine, following a suggestion from a neighbor, she began participating in ballet productions held at Bharatiya Vidya Bhavan.

Her early stage career included performances in ballets such as Ram, where she performed alongside Kanak Rele (who played the role of Sita), as well as Geet Govind and Noor Jehan. These productions were directed by Virendra Desai. During this period, she earned approximately 20 rupees per show. By performing on weekends, she contributed 80 rupees monthly to her household, which served as a significant financial support for her family at the time.

== Personal life ==
Seema was cast in the film Gyanba Tukaram in 1958, produced by V. Avadhoot, the younger brother of legendary filmmaker V. Shantaram. It was during the production of this film that she developed a romantic relationship with her co-star, Ramesh Deo.

A notable incident occurred on the film set while the two actors were positioned on a bullock cart filled with hay for a scene. As the cart was moved to a distant location for the shot, a passing cloud caused a delay in filming. While waiting for the light to improve, Ramesh Deo proposed marriage to her. After a courtship lasting six years, the couple married on 1 July 1963. The wedding ceremony took place at the Rajaram Theatre in Kolhapur. They had two sons, actor Ajinkya Deo and director Abhinay Deo. She suffered from Alzheimer's disease in the last few years of her life. Seema Deo died on 24 August 2023, at the age of 81.

== Filmography ==
| Year | Title | Role | Notes |
|---|---|---|---|
| 1957 | Aaliya Bhogasi | Sister | |
| 1960 | Miya Bibi Razi | Rajni | |
| 1960 | Nirupama Aani Parirani | | |
| 1960 | Jagachya Pathivar | Blind Young Girl | Marathi film |
| 1961 | Bhabhi Ki Chudiyan | Prabha | |
| 1961 | Prapanch | Champa | Marathi film |
| 1962 | Prem Patra | Tara | |
| 1962 | Varadakshina | Krishna Apte | Marathi film |
| 1962 | Rangalya Ratri Asha | Radha | Marathi film |
| 1963 | Ha Mazha Marg Ekla | Shankar's wife | Marathi film |
| 1963 | Molkarin | Malu | Marathi film |
| 1963 | Pahu Re Kiti Vaat | Sulabha | Marathi film |
| 1966 | Dus Lakh | Devki | |
| 1967 | Juna Te Sona | Manda | Marathi film |
| 1968 | Saraswatichandra | Alak | |
| 1968 | Krishna Bhakt Sudama | Yashoda | Marathi film |
| 1969 | Aparadh | Vasudha | Marathi film |
| 1971 | Anand | Suman Kulkarni | |
| 1972 | Banphool | Janaki | |
| 1972 | Koshish | Teacher | |
| 1973 | Sabak | Mrs. Chavan | |
| 1973 | Kashmakash | Manmohan's wife | |
| 1973 | Naya Nasha | Protesting Student's mother | |
| 1974 | Kora Kagaz | Archana's Aunt | |
| 1975 | Rani Aur Lalpari | Pappu's mother | |
| 1975 | Sunehra Sansar | Shobha | |
| 1976 | Sankoch | Avinash's wife | |
| 1976 | Sajjo Rani | Balbir's wife | |
| 1977 | Dream Girl | Mrs. Kapoor | |
| 1977 | Yehi Hai Zindagi | Gayatri Narayan | |
| 1977 | Badla | Vrunda | Marathi film |
| 1978 | Karva Chauth | Garwe Wali | |
| 1979 | Janaki | Janaki Sawant | Marathi film |
| 1979 | Dada | Tara Dharamdas | |
| 1979 | Jyoti Bane Jwala | Parvati | |
| 1980 | Patita | Rajni's mother | |
| 1981 | Main Aur Mera Haathi | Julie's mother | |
| 1982 | Hum Paagal Premee | Prem's mother | |
| 1982 | Haathkadi | Shanta | |
| 1982 | Teesri Aankh | Devki | |
| 1982 | Sanam Teri Kasam | Sudha Sharma | |
| 1982 | Ghazab | Laxmi | |
| 1982 | Lakshmi | Mohan's wife | |
| 1982 | Bezubaan | Vidya | |
| 1982 | Anokha Bandhan | Shyamlal's mom | |
| 1982 | Daulat | Radhika | |
| 1982 | Baawri | Sham's mother | |
| 1982 | Jeeo Aur Jeene Do | Shanti Singh | |
| 1982 | Sitam | Meenakshi's mother | |
| 1982 | Anmol Sitaare | Seema | |
| 1983 | Chatpati | Seeta Tripathi | |
| 1983 | Taqdeer | Seema Singh | |
| 1983 | Ganga Meri Maa | Unnamed | |
| 1983 | Film Hi Film | Savitri Shah | |
| 1983 | Mujhe Insaaf Chahiye | Shanti Roy | |
| 1983 | Karate | Geeta's mother | |
| 1983 | Baiko Asavi Ashi | Sau Akka | Marathi film |
| 1983 | Hum Se Hai Zamana | Kalicharan | |
| 1983 | Bekaraar | Shyam's aunty | |
| 1983 | Mehndi | Lisa | |
| 1984 | Sardaar | Damayanti | |
| 1984 | Apna Bhi Koi Hota | Alvina Kotian | |
| 1984 | Yeh Desh | Azad's sister | |
| 1984 | Bheema | Seema's mom | |
| 1984 | Laila | Durga | |
| 1984 | Grahasthi | Shanta | |
| 1984 | Sharara | Mrs. Mehra | |
| 1984 | Insaaf Kaun Karega | Veeru's mother | |
| 1985 | Pyar Jhukta Nahin | Unnamed | |
| 1985 | Kabhie Ajnabi The | Mamta/Maria | |
| 1985 | Jaan Ki Baazi | Amar's mother | |
| 1985 | Mard | Jamuna | |
| 1985 | Ek Chitthi Pyar Bhari | Hostel manager | |
| 1986 | Zindagani | Sudarshan's wife | |
| 1986 | Pyar Kiya Hai Pyar Karenge | Mrs. Shukla | |
| 1986 | Asli Naqli | Laxmi Narayan | |
| 1986 | Jumbish | Najma | |
| 1986 | Khel Mohabbat Ka | Shyama | |
| 1986 | Anubhav | Ganga | |
| 1986 | Naseeb Apna Apna | Kishen's mother | |
| 1987 | Sansar | Godavari Sharma | |
| 1987 | Hawalaat | Parvati | |
| 1987 | Goraa | Shanti Deshpande | |
| 1987 | Uttar Dakshin | Sharda | |
| 1987 | Jawaab Hum Denge | Jaikishan's mother | |
| 1987 | Porinchi Dhamaal Baapachi Kamaal | Renuka Avadhoot | Marathi film |
| 1987 | Sarja | Gauri Dombarin | Marathi film |
| 1987 | Naam O Nishan | Sangram's wife | |
| 1987 | Deewana Tere Naam Ka | Shankar's mother | |
| 1988 | Paap Ki Duniya | Renu's mother | |
| 1988 | Janam Janam | Sunil's mother | |
| 1988 | Paanch Fauladi | Parvati | |
| 1988 | Aakhri Adaalat | Mrs. Sinha | |
| 1988 | Dariya Dil | Lakshmi | |
| 1989 | Guru | Rama & Uma's mother | |
| 1989 | Jaisi Karni Waisi Bharnii | Laxmi Verma | |
| 1989 | Sachai Ki Taqat | Durga's mother | |
| 1989 | Hum Bhi Insaan Hai | Dharampal's wife | |
| 1989 | Hamaar Dulha | Seema | Bhojpuri film |
| 1990 | Mera Pati Sirf Mera Hai | Chandra | |
| 1990 | Majboor | Janaki | |
| 1990 | Paap Ki Kamaee | Ashwini's mother | |
| 1990 | Jamai Raja | Raja's mother | |
| 1991 | Benaam Badsha | Savitri | |
| 1991 | Karz Chukana Hai | Lakshmi | |
| 1991 | Jeeva Sakha | Jeeva & Sakha's mother | Marathi film |
| 1991 | Rin Shodh | Nolini | Bengali film |
| 1992 | Sanam Aapki Khatir | Lakshmi | |
| 1992 | Police Aur Mujrim | Vishal's mother | |
| 1992 | Deedar | Dr. Shanti | |
| 1993 | Roop Ki Rani Choron Ka Raja | Mrs. Verma | |
| 1993 | Gurudev | Saraswati | |
| 1993 | Veerta | Mangal's mother | |
| 1993 | Hum Hain Kamaal Ke | Sharda | |
| 1993 | Zakhmo Ka Hisaab | Savitri Nath | |
| 1994 | Ulfat Ki Nayee Manzilen | Maa | |
| 1994 | Kunku | Aaisaheb Inamdar | |
| 1994 | Policewala Gunda | Ajit's mother | Cameo appearance |
| 2010 | Jetaa | Sumati Rajadhyaksha | Marathi film |
| 2011 | Dubhang | Vishakha's aunt | Marathi film |
| 2019 | Marudhar Express | Neeta | |
| 2021 | Jivan Sandhya | Mrs. Rane | Marathi film |

== See also ==
- Ramesh Deo
- Ajinkya Deo
- Abhinay Deo
