= Tomchi =

- Directed by: Rajesh Gupta
- Screenplay by: Aashish Sinha, Dr. Ravindra Katyayn
- Produced by: Rajesh Gupta
- Starring: Yashpal Sharma; Vrajesh Hirjee; Rati Agnihotri; Mahesh Thakur
- Cinematography: Jaii Nandan
- Edited by: Lav singh & Shankar samant
- Music by: A R Creations
- Release date: 30 May 2025
- Country: India
- Language: Hindi

Tomchi is an Indian Hindi-language children's film directed by Rajesh Gupta and produced by Tulsi Production with support from Star Buzz. The film's music is composed primarily by Anand Raj Anand, with a special song composed by Ritesh Bhoyar. The lyrics for the songs are penned by Narendra Bedi, Ritesh Bhoyar, Akhilesh, and Manoj. The background score is composed by Puneet Dixit.

Tomchi was released in cinemas on 30 May 2025.

== Cast ==
- Yashpal Sharma
- Vrajesh Hirjee
- Rati Agnihotri
- Mahesh Thakur
- Narendra Bedi
- Upasana Singh
- Kurush Deboo
- Shital Shah
- Swati Aggarwal

=== Child Actors in the Movie ===
- Faiza Thakur
- Azaan Shah
- Rohit Kumar Sharma (shown as Rohit Kumar)
- Yana Mistry
- Azaan Khan
- Adeeb Hussain
- Alam Khan
- Haitvi Parek

== Filming ==
Shooting of the film started at the end of November 2018, in Chitrakoot public school (Sikar). It was also shot on various location in Surat and Mumbai. Special guest appearances were shot with actress Madhoo at S.J. Studio Mumbai.

== Release ==
The film is scheduled to be released on 30 May 2025.
