= Married 2 America =

- Directed by: Dilip Shankar
- Story by: Dilip Shankar
- Produced by: Avishkar Rupwate
- Starring: Jackie Shroff; Archana Joglekar; Shweta Tiwari; Raghuveer Yadav
- Music by: Javed Ali; Keerti Sood
- Release date: 17 February 2012
- Country: India
- Language: Hindi

Married 2 America is a 2012 Hindi-language drama film directed by Dilip Shankar featuring Jackie Shroff, Archana Joglekar, Anjali Malhotra, Shweta Tiwari, Raghubir Yadav, and Chetan Pandit in the lead roles. The film was released on 17 February 2012 to mixed reviews.

== Summary ==
While looking into the cause of a dam burst, NRI architect cum engineer Ravi Malhotra goes missing in Bihar. His anxious wife Anjali travels to India in search of her husband, but her quest is fraught with danger.

== Cast ==
- Jackie Shroff as Pratap Singh
- Archana Joglekar as Anjali Malhotra
- Shweta Tiwari as Pratap Singh's wife
- Raghubir Yadav as Raghu
- Chetan Pandit as Ravi Malhotra
- Ashok Samarth as Vishnu
- Akhilendra Mishra
- Ganesh Yadav
- Chalky White as Executive in USA

== Location ==
1. Jabalpur
  1. Bargi Dam
  2. Bhedaghaat
  3. Narmada Ghaat
  4. City
  5. Bargi Forest
  6. Khandaari Dam
  7. JNKVV
2. United States

== Music ==
| No. | Title | Length |
|---|---|---|
| 1. | "O Pardesi" |
| 2. | "Dil Ki Itni Kahani Hai" |
| 3. | "Sanjh Laja Gayi" |
| 4. | "Haadson Mein" |
| 5. | "Rabba Re" |
| 6. | "Dil Ki Itni Kahani Hai (Sad Version)" |
