= Samsaram Adhu Minsaram =

1986 film directed by Visu

- Poster
- Directed by: Visu
- Written by: Visu
- Based on: Uravukku Kai Koduppom by Visu
- Produced by: M. Saravanan; M. Balasubramanian
- Starring: See Cast
- Cinematography: N. Balakrishnan
- Edited by: A. Paul Duraisingam
- Music by: Shankar–Ganesh
- Production company: AVM Productions
- Release date: 18 July 1986
- Running time: 145 minutes
- Country: India
- Language: Tamil
- Budget: ₹1.5 million

Samsaram Adhu Minsaram (transl. Wife is like electricity) is a 1986 Indian Tamil-language drama film produced by AVM Productions, and written and directed by Visu. He also stars in an ensemble cast including Lakshmi, Chandrasekhar, Kishmu, Raghuvaran, Delhi Ganesh, Ilavarasi, Manorama, Madhuri, Kamala Kamesh, Dilip and Haja Sheriff. The film revolves around the splintering of a joint family, and the efforts made by the patriarch's eldest daughter-in-law to reunite them.

The story of Samsaram Adhu Minsaram was inspired by Visu's play Uravukku Kai Koduppom (transl. We shall support relations), which had already been adapted into a 1975 film. Despite the failure of the 1975 film, the producer M. Saravanan liked the story, so it was reinvented into Samsaram Adhu Minsaram. The film was made on a then shoestring budget of ₹1.5 million, and the whole crew worked for 35 days. The cinematography was handled by N. Balakrishnan and the editing was done by A. Paul Duraisingham.

Samsaram Adhu Minsaram released on 18 July 1986. The film received critical acclaim and ran for 25 weeks in theatres. It won the National Film Award for Best Popular Film Providing Wholesome Entertainment (the first Tamil film to do so), the Filmfare Award for Best Tamil Film, three Cinema Express Awards (including Best Tamil Film and Best Tamil Actress for Lakshmi) and the Filmfans Association Awards for Best Film. In 1987, the film was remade in Hindi as Sansar, in Telugu as Samsaram Oka Chadarangam, in Kannada as Onde Goodina Hakkigalu and in Malayalam as Kudumbapuranam.

== Plot ==
Ammaiyappan Mudaliar, a Government Clerk in Madras, lives with his wife Godavari, his 4 children Chidambaram, a Junior Officer; Siva, a Mechanic; Sarojini, a Vainglory Steno; and Bharathi, a Useless Fellow who Failed 12th Grade 3 times and he is Repeating 12th Grade for the 4th time; and Chidambaram's wife Uma. As Ammaiyappan struggles to manage the needs of his joint family with his meagre income, Ammaiyappan's 2 employed sons Chidambaram and Siva supplement it with their monetary contributions. Ammaiyappan plans to get Sarojini married and invites the prospective groom's family for a meeting.

The conceited Sarojini rebukes the guests and declares her plan to marry her colleague Peter Fernandes. The entire family initially opposes her decision as Ammaiyappan's family are Hindus and Peter is a Christian. Ammaiyappan meets with Peter's father, Albert Fernandes, and realises that they are honest people, and both families ultimately agree on Peter's and Sarojini's wedding. Ammaiyappan meets and apologises to the rejected groom's father. Impressed with Ammaiyappan and his family, he offers to get his daughter Vasantha's wedding to Siva. Weddings of Peter and Sarojini, Siva and Vasantha takes place happily. Uma is pregnant, Uma goes to her parents home at Bombay to deliver her baby.

Bharathi Fails 12th Grade for the 4th time and he is beaten severely by Siva. Later, when Bharathi repeats 12th Grade for the 5th time he tries to Pass 12th Grade within a year and he seeks help from Vasantha, a graduate. But within weeks, Vasantha struggles to adjust to the new environment as she gets little privacy to be with Siva. Bharathi seeks her help for tutoring even late at night, and the family chores keep her busy in the day so Vasantha is unable to cope. After a fight happened between Siva and Vasantha at Siva's home, One early morning Vasantha returns to her father's home without informing anyone. The same early morning Sarojini returns to Ammaiyappan's home after a fight happened between Peter and Sarojini at Peter's home as Sarojini prioritises socialising over domestic responsibilities. Siva visits Vasantha's father, who is criticising Vasantha. The duo then walks home when Siva tells Vasantha to wait a few more months for privacy or let go of him. Vasantha returns to Siva's home while Siva leaves for work.

That same day, Chidambaram halves his monthly contribution to the family, during Uma's absence. An argument happens between Ammaiyappan and Chidambaram. Upset with Chidambaram's tightfistedness on spending money for his parents and his siblings, Ammaiyappan orders Chidambaram to leave the house. In turn, Chidambaram demands the ₹18000 he had spent for Peter's and Sarojini's wedding with interest for Chidambaram to leave the house. Deeply insulted, Ammaiyappan draws Lakshman Rekha dividing the house into 2 halves, and Ammaiyappan announces that neither side should cross it or communicate with members of the other side. Ammaiyappan also declares Chidambaram's family has to reside on one side of the house, and Ammaiyappan will pay a net sum of ₹20000 within 12 months for Chidambaram to leave the house. The only person with access to both sides of the house is maidservant of the house, Kannamma.

Uma returns to Chidambaram's home at Madras with her newborn baby and she is shocked by the developments at home. Uma is sad to see Sarojini back and an unhappy Vasantha. Uma takes the help of Albert and Kannamma to reunite Peter and Sarojini and Uma advises Siva to take Vasantha on a sojourn to rejuvenate his relationship with his wife. Bharathi also Passes 12th Grade. Though the problems are sorted out, Uma is upset that her brothers-in-law are still abiding by their father's order and not talking to her. Kannamma cajoles Ammaiyappan not to be very adamant and forgive his son.

Meanwhile, Chidambaram ends up spending more money per head for his small family after the division than he allocated when they were together with the extended family. So Chidambaram reconsiders his decision to live separately and decides to reunite with his father. However, Uma disagrees, as once a bond is broken for the sake of money, it cannot be restored to its original state. Uma states that Ammaiyappan's family and Chidambaram's family may not rejoin for the sake of money, and any bond should be based on unconditional love. Uma recommends Ammaiyappan's family and Chidambaram's family living separately but on talking terms, celebrating weekends and festivals as the best way to live peacefully, to which Chidambaram agrees, and Chidambaram, Uma, and their Child move out of Ammaiyappan's home the same evening.

== Cast ==
- Lakshmi as Uma
- Chandrasekhar as Siva
- Kishmu as Albert Fernandes
- Raghuvaran as Chidambaram
- Delhi Ganesh as Vasantha's father
- Ilavarasi as Sarojini
- Manorama as Kannamma
- Madhuri as Vasantha
- Kamala Kamesh as Godavari
- Dilip as Peter Fernandes
- Haja Sheriff as Bharathi
- Omakuchi Narasimhan as Matchmaker
- Visu as Ammaiyappan Mudaliar

== Production ==
After writing Nallavanukku Nallavan (1984) for AVM Productions, Visu told M. Saravanan of AVM his wish that they finance his next film. Saravanan agreed and stipulated that Visu work exclusively on that film till completion. Visu narrated some stories, but Saravanan was not pleased with any of them; he wanted a "neat family story", similar to Visu's earlier films like Kudumbam Oru Kadambam (1981). Visu narrated the story that would later be titled Samsaram Adhu Minsaram, and an impressed Saravanan asked why he had not done so before. He replied that the story was derived from his play Uravukku Kai Koduppom, which had already been adapted into a 1975 film produced by K. S. Gopalakrishnan that was not successful. However, since Saravanan liked the story, he said they could reinvent it and bought it from Gopalakrishnan. Kamala Kamesh was cast as Visu's wife; she had played the female lead role in the play, but that character was played by Lakshmi in the film adaptation.

The character of the maidservant Kannamma, played by Manorama, was created specifically for the film by Visu, at Saravanan's insistence; Visu was initially reluctant, feeling the comical character would dilute the story. When titling the film, Visu came up with roughly twelve titles and asked Saravanan which one he liked. Saravanan chose Samsaram Adhu Minsaram, because he felt it was filled with "freshness". The film was made on a then shoestring budget of ₹1.5 million (equivalent to ₹22 million or US$240,000 in 2026) and the whole crew worked for 35 days and exposed 34,000 feet (10,000 m) of film. The filming was held at a home specifically created inside AVM Studios which was built within three months as AVM "decided to build a real house rather than use a temporary set". Cinematography was handled by N. Balakrishnan, and editing by A. Paul Duraisingham. It was filmed using ORWOcolour, to reduce production costs.

== Themes ==
Visu stated that Samsaram Adhu Minsaram was inspired by his upbringing in a joint family, saying that by growing up in such an environment, he observed how each person had a different opinion: "It wasn't bad, just that we were different. I wondered, ‘Wouldn't other joint families have similar issues?’ So I started writing scripts that reflect the day-to-day scenario in a joint family" such as this. The children of Ammaiyappan are named after historical figures, primarily those involved in fighting for India's independence from the British Raj such as Chidambaran (V. O. Chidambaram Pillai), Siva (Subramaniya Siva), Sarojini (Sarojini Naidu) and Bharathi (Subramania Bharati). According to S. Srivatsan of The Hindu, the characters of Samsaram Adhu Minsaram "deliver a larger point on familial values without romanticising the social conditions in which they live". He also felt that, despite the main plot being about the conflict between Ammaiyappan and Chidambaram, Uma is the "nucleus" of the film, and "the rest of the characters are treated as protons and neutrons, orbiting around Uma".

== Soundtrack ==
The music was composed by Shankar–Ganesh, with lyrics by Vairamuthu. Shankar–Ganesh reused the song "Oora Therinjukitten" from Padikkadavan which was composed by Ilaiyaraaja and sung by K. J. Yesudas.

Track listing
No.	Title	Singer(s)	Length
1.	"Janaki Devi"	K. S. Chithra	4:09
2.	"Azhagiya Anni"	P. Jayachandran, P. Susheela	4:04
3.	"Samsaram Adhu Minsaram"	S. P. Balasubrahmanyam	6:05
4.	"Katti Karumbe Kanna"	Vani Jairam	4:59
5.	"Oora Therinjukitten"	Malaysia Vasudevan	3:56
Total length:			23:13

== Release ==
Samsaram Adhu Minsaram was released on 18 July 1986. and ran for 25 weeks in theatres, becoming a silver jubilee hit. Distributors received profits worth 10 times the buying price. M. G. Ramachandran, then the Chief Minister of Tamil Nadu, was the chief guest for the silver jubilee function.

=== Critical reception ===
The film received critical acclaim. Ananda Vikatan, in its review dated 27 July 1986, said Visu had moved into his domain of middle-class family issues based films and brought out an excellent film, calling it a tasty food from AVM. Jayamanmadhan of Kalki wrote that one thing was very clear: Visu's handed over masala was a family story. Balumani of Anna praised acting and Visu's direction and appreciated him for giving an amazing family drama.

=== Accolades ===
Samsaram Adhu Minsaram was the first Tamil film to win the National Film Award for Best Popular Film Providing Wholesome Entertainment.

Event	Category	Recipient	Ref.
Cinema Express Awards	Best Film – Tamil	M. Saravanan	
Cinema Express Awards	Best Actress – Tamil	Lakshmi	
Cinema Express Awards	Special Recommendation	Visu	
Filmfare Awards South	Best Film – Tamil	M. Saravanan	
Filmfans Association Awards	Best Film	M. Saravanan	
National Film Awards	Best Popular Film Providing Wholesome Entertainment	M. Saravanan	

== Remakes ==
Year	Title	Language	Ref.
1987	Samsaram Oka Chadarangam	Telugu	
1987	Onde Goodina Hakkigalu	Kannada	
1987	Sansar	Hindi	
1988	Kudumbapuranam	Malayalam	

== Legacy ==
One of the most famous scenes in Samsaram Adhu Minsaram was that where Kannamma and Albert Fernandes enact a drama to reunite Sarojini and Peter.

== Bibliography ==
- Arunachalam, Param (2020). BollySwar 1981–1990. Mavrix Infotech. ISBN 978-8193848227.
- Rajadhyaksha, Ashish; Willemen, Paul (1998) [1994]. Encyclopaedia of Indian Cinema. British Film Institute and Oxford University Press. ISBN 0-19-563579-5.
- Saravanan, M. (2013) [2005]. AVM 60 Cinema (3rd ed.). Rajarajan Pathippagam. OCLC 1158347612.
