= Jeeva Sakha =

- Poster
- Directed by: Ramesh Deo
- Screenplay by: Yashwant Ranjankar
- Story by: Ramesh Deo
- Produced by: Guru Sharma; Shobha Jain; Ramesh Deo
- Starring: Ajinkya Deo; Sachin Khedekar; Varsha Usgaonkar; Seema Deo; Ravindra Mahajani; Laxmikant Berde; Mahesh Manjrekar; Ashutosh Gowariker; Kishori Shahane
- Cinematography: Girish Karve
- Edited by: Dattaram Tawde
- Music by: Anil Mohile
- Production company: Dharmesh Productions
- Release date: 1991
- Running time: 118 minutes
- Country: India
- Language: Marathi

Jeeva Sakha is a 1991 Indian Marathi-language drama film written and directed by Ramesh Deo, from a screenplay by Yashwant Ranjankar, and produced by Dharmesh Productions. The film stars Ajinkya Deo and Sachin Khedekar in the title roles, Varsha Usgaonkar, Seema Deo, Ravindra Mahajani, Laxmikant Berde, Mahesh Manjrekar, Ashutosh Gowariker, Kishori Shahane, and Swapnil Joshi.

== Plot ==
After being posted to another town, Sakha leaves his widowed mother and brother Jeeva in Dhangao. At the same time, Nagya coerces the villagers into selling their land to a greedy industrialist.

== Cast ==
- Varsha Usgaonkar as Paro
- Seema Deo as Jeeva and Sakha's mother
- Ajinkya Deo Jeeva
- Ravindra Mahajani as DK
- Laxmikant Berde Baadshah
- Sachin Khedekar as Sakha
- Mahesh Manjrekar as Inspector Jamdade
- Ashutosh Gowariker as Nagojirao "Nagya" Patil
- Ajay Wadhavkar as Pandit
- Raja Mayekar
- Kishori Shahane as Julie
- Swapnil Joshi

== Music ==
The music is composed by Anil Mohile and scored by Asha Bhosle, Suresh Wadkar, Sudesh Bhosle, Pragya Khandekar, Kavita Krishnamurthy, and Mohammad Aziz, while lyrics was written by Shantaram Nandgaonkar and Praveen Danve.

All lyrics are written by Pravin Danve, Shantaram Nandgaonkar; all music is composed by Anil Mohile.

Track listing
| No. | Title | Singer (s) | Length |
|---|---|---|---|
| 1. | "Ae Jhipari Ga Baai" | Asha Bhosale, Suresh Wadkar | 3:49 |
| 2. | "Are Buddhu Milala" | Asha Bhosale, Suresh Wadkar | 3:34 |
| 3. | "Door Sakha Chalala – Happy" | Mohammed Aziz, Suresh Wadkar | 4:28 |
| 4. | "He Juli Juli" | Sudesh Bhosale, Pradnya Khandekar | 5:42 |
| 5. | "Door Sakha Chalala – Sad" | Mohammed Aziz | 2:06 |
| Total length: | | | 19:32 |
