= Dastaan (1995 TV series) =

- Directed by: Farouk Masoudi
- Starring: See below
- Country of origin: India
- Original language: Hindi

Original release
- Network: Zee TV
- Release: 1995 – 1997

Dastaan is a TV show that aired on Zee TV from 1995 to 1997. The show was shot in the U.A.E., particularly Sharjah, and starred Parmeet Sethi, Navni Parihar, Nishigandha Wad and Ashish Vidyarthi. It was directed by Farouk Masoudi, who would go on to direct another U.A.E. filmed Zee TV Series - Chattaan. Dastaan was about the rivalry between two businessmen — Karan Kapoor and Lankesh. The show also features Suresh Oberoi as Rohan, Karan's best Friend and temporary chairman of Karan's company. Prominent Sharjah landmarks of the 90s featured in this show include Souq Al Majarrah, Jazeera Park, Ittihad Park, Bait Al Naboodah, Souq Al Arsah and many more. Incomplete sequence of this series' episodes are available on YouTube, uploaded by Zee TV's official account.

== Cast ==
- Parmeet Sethi as Karan Kapoor
- Ashish Vidyarthi as Lankesh
- Navni Parihar as Suman
- Nishigandha Wad as Nishi Malhotra
- Mahavir Shah as Raj Tilak
- Neelima Parandekar as Mona
- Supriya Karnik as Roma
- Sunil Anand as Gautham Verma
- Ashok Deshpande as Vivek
- Kamal Nandi as Mukherjee
- Nasir Ali as Tiwari
- Sohail Butt as Sohail
- Narendra Sadhwani as Hasmukh
- Imran Khan as Kapil Mehra
- Afshan Khan as Sonia Kapoor
- Virendra Saxena as Vasudev
- Anwar Mehfooz as Car Showroom Manager
- Suresh Oberoi as Rohan
- Khalid Bin Shaheen as Varun Wadi
- Navneet Nishan as Neelam
- Shalini Kapoor as Shalini
- Timmy Abdullah as Saleem
- Sadhana as Mrs. Sharma
- Wafa Haji as Anjali
- Niki Aneja Walia
