= Anpekshit =

- Poster
- Directed by: Sanjeev Naik
- Screenplay by: Sanjeet Narvekar
- Story by: Raja Padgaonkar
- Produced by: Sanjeev Naik
- Starring: Nitish Bharadwaj; Archana Joglekar; Ashok Saraf; Rekha Roa; Sudhir Dalvi
- Cinematography: Prakash Shinde
- Edited by: Sanjeev Naik
- Music by: Sharang Dev
- Production company: Sarav Productions
- Release date: 1991
- Running time: 109 minutes
- Country: India
- Language: Marathi

Anpekshit (transl. Unexpected) is a 1991 Indian Marathi-language thriller film directed and produced by Sanjeev Naik. The film stars Nitish Bharadwaj, Archana Joglekar and Ashok Saraf in prominent roles with Sudhir Dalvi, Rekha Roa, Chandu Parkhi in supporting roles. Joglekar received recognition for her performance in the film. She Won Maharashtra State Film Award for Best Actress.

== Plot ==
Popular pop singer Meghna finds top Kolhapur celebrity Uttamrao Pawar waiting for her at home after one of her performances, and he tries to molest her. Sub Inspector Vijay Mohite and Inspector Karde, two police officers, help Uttamrao escape after Meghna threatens to shoot him. They don't believe her because they don't have any proof and discover that Uttamrao is actually in Lonavala, not Mumbai. Later on, Meghna is attacked by Uttamrao once more. She stabs him, and he is declared dead. The police see this as a coincidence and label it as Meghna's hallucinations. Uttamrao had not been involved in the money incident, but he avoids it. Meghna, though, is unable to move past everything and believes Uttamrao is out to get her.

== Cast ==
- Nitish Bharadwaj as Sub Inspector Vijay Mohite
- Archana Joglekar as Meghna Vardhe
- Ashok Saraf in dual role as
  - Uttamrao Pawar
  - Abandoned son of Uttamrao Pawar
- Rekha Rao as Savita
- Sudhir Dalvi as Inspector Tarde
- Chandu Parkhi as Apparao

== Soundtrack ==
The music is composed by Sharang Dev and the songs were sung by Anuradha Paudwal, Sudesh Bhosale, Kavita Krishnamurthy, Vinay Mandke. The lyrics are written by Shantaram Nandgaonkar.

=== Songs ===
1. "Premacha Tarana Talacha Danana Garagara Ghumwa"
2. "Aaplya Jivani Preet Sakarate"
3. "Tujsave Rajsa Durvale Dhund Ha Wara"
4. "Ja Ja Preet Phula Kadhihi Ye"
