= Mahesh Thakur =

Indian actor

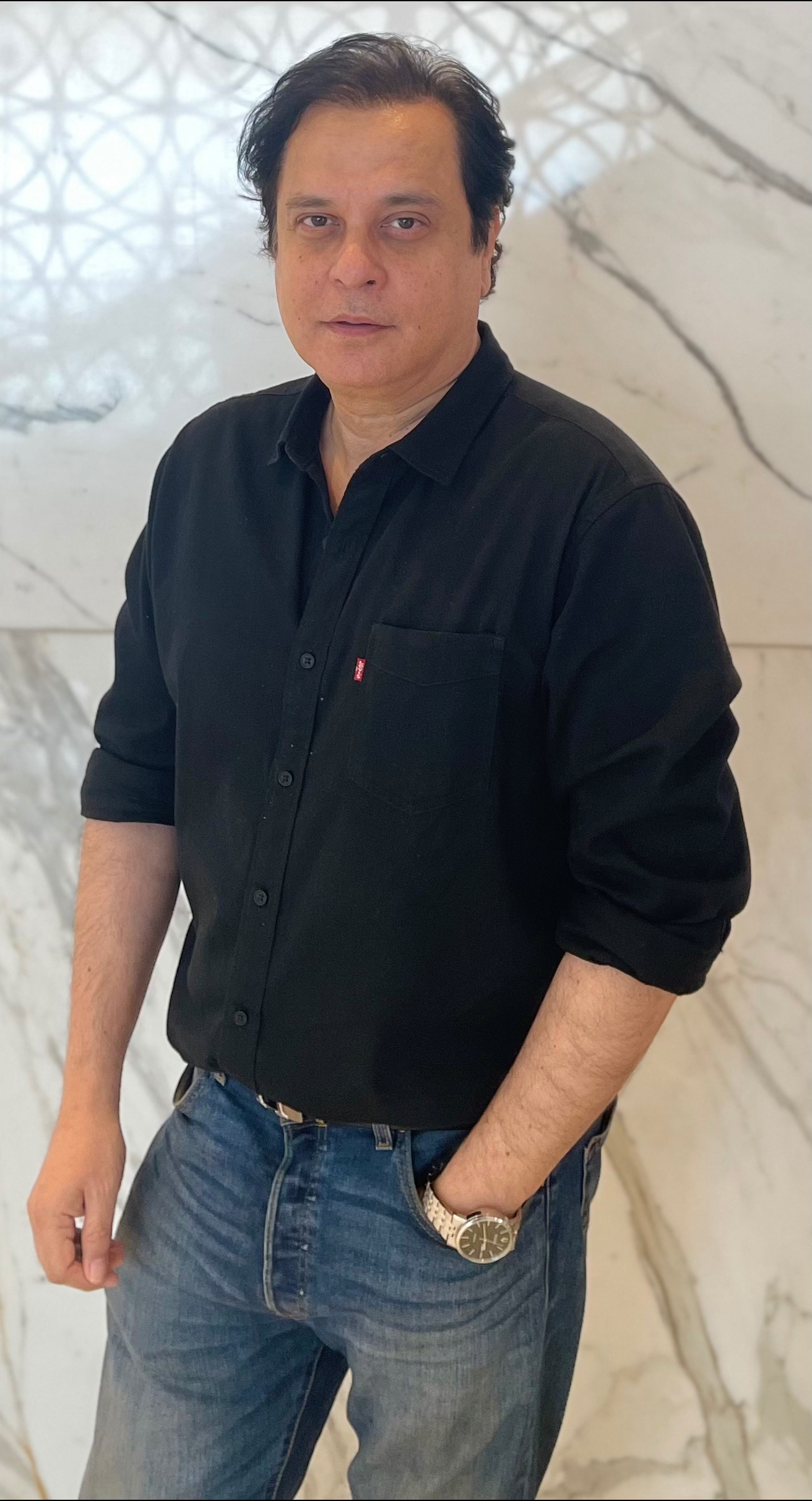
- Thakur in 2022
- Occupation: Actor
- Years active: 1992–present
- Known for: Tu Tu Main Main; Hum Saath-Saath Hain: We Stand United; Astitva...Ek Prem Kahani; Ishqbaaaz
- Spouse: Sapna Thakur
- Website: https://maheshthakur.in/

Mahesh Thakur is an Indian actor who has appeared in numerous films, television series, web productions, and theatre since the 1990s.

== Filmography ==
=== Films ===
Year	Title	Role
1992	Meri Janeman	Ravi
1995	Kaala Sach	Inspector Amar
1999	Hum Saath-Saath Hain	Anand Babu
2001	Rahul	Naveen Malhotra
2001	Hum Ho Gaye Aapke	Dr. Shekhar
2005	Barsaat	Dr Pranav Kapoor
2005	Bluffmaster	Mr. Malhotra
2005	Dosti: Friends Forever	Bhaskar Saluja
2006	Humko Deewana Kar Gaye	Robby Kohli
2008	Thoda Pyaar Thoda Magic	Lawyer
2011	F.A.L.T.U	Mr. Nigam
2011	Chala Mussaddi... Office Office	Judge Subhash
2011	Not a Love Story	Sam
2012	In the Name of Tai	Mahesh
2013	Akaash Vani	Vani's Mama
2013	Aashiqui 2	Saigal Uncle
2013	Satya 2	Pavan Lahothi
2014	Karle Pyaar Karle	Kabir's brother
2014	Jai Ho	Rehaan
2017	Blue Mountains	Prakash
2018	Jalebi	Aisha's father
2021	Velle	Ravikant Agarwal
2022	Kacchey Limbu	Ajit Nath
2023	Selfiee	Naveen
2025	Ajab Gajab Ishq	Jagmohan Sharma
2025	Baaghi 4	Doctor Anand
2025	Tomchi	

=== Television ===
Year	Serial	Role	Notes
1994–2000	Tu Tu Main Main	Ravi Jaanu Verma / Sooraj	
1995–1997	Swabhimaan		
1995	Aahat	Vinod	Episode "The Lake"
1995–1998	Sailaab	Avinash	
1999–2000	Hudd Kar Di	Suraj Singh Dhanwa	
1999–2000	Sparsh	Anand	
2000–2001	Saas Pe Sava Saas	Prashant	
2001	Kudrat	Ajaynarayan Seth	
2002–2006	Astitva...Ek Prem Kahani	Dr. Abhimanyu Joshi a.k.a. Manu	
2002–2004	Doli Leke Aayee Hai Dulhaniya		
2003–2006	Shararat	Dr. Suraj Malhotra	
2004–2005	Malini Iyer	Pankaj Sabharwal	
2005	Ye Meri Life Hai	Dr. Rastogi	
2006	Kadvee Khattee Meethi	Ravi Verma	Sequel series of Tu Tu Main Main
2007	Sapna Babul Ka...Bidaai	Kishanchand Awasthy	Special appearance
2007–2008	Bhabhi	Vivek Seth	
2007–2008	Jiya Jale	Krishnakant Kotak	
2010–2012	Sasural Genda Phool	Kamal Kishore Bajpai	
2010–2011	Tera Mujhse Hai Pehle Ka Naata Koi	Adheer Singh	
2012	Luck Luck Ki Baat	Kishore Kumar	Television film
2012	Ramleela – Ajay Devgn Ke Saath	Janaka	
2013	Ghar Aaja Pardesi	Raghav Mishra	
2015	Kabhi Aise Geet Gaya Karo	Raj	
2016	Woh Teri Bhabhi Hai Pagle	Mr. Raichand	
2016–2018	Ishqbaaaz	Tej Singh Oberoi	
2017	Dil Boley Oberoi	Tej Singh Oberoi	Spin-off series of Ishqbaaaz
2018	Udaan	Colonel Yashvant Bedi	
2019–2020	Modi: Journey of a Common Man	Narendra Modi	Web series
2021	Janani	Brijmohan	
2022–2023	Faltu	Janardhan Mittal	
2023–2024	Aangan – Aapno Kaa	Jaydev "Jay" Sharma	
2024	Dil Dosti Dilemma	AB	
2025	Ghum Hai Kisikey Pyaar Meiin	Mohit Chavan	

== Bibliography ==
Mahesh Thakur has authored two books. His first book, I Quotes (2021), published by Popular Prakashan, is a collection of over 160 quotations exploring themes of inspiration, motivation, and spirituality. His second book, The Oath of the Unhuan (2026), published by Nu Voice Press, is an epic fantasy novel set in a fictional Himalayan world, exploring elemental powers, ancient prophecies, and the conflict between spiritual wisdom and the pursuit of power.

- I QUOTES. Popular Prakashan. 26 February 2021. ISBN 9788194871446.
- The Oath of the Unhuan. Nu Voice Press. 31 July 2026. ISBN 9788168731653.
