= Blue Mountains (2015 film) =

Blue Mountains: A Modern Day Classic
- Directed by: Suman Ganguli
- Written by: Suman Ganguli
- Screenplay by: Indranil Goswami; Suman Ganguli
- Story by: Suman Ganguli
- Produced by: Rajesh Kumar Jain
- Starring: Ranvir Shorey; Gracy Singh; Rajpal Yadav; Simran Sharma; Arif Zakaria; Mahesh Thakur; Yatharth Ratnum; Sanjeev Rathore
- Cinematography: Chandrashekhar Rath
- Edited by: Asif Ali Shaikh
- Music by: Sundeep Gosswami & Surya Vishwakarma; Monty Sharma; Adesh Shrivastava
- Release dates: 15 November 2015 (19th International Children Film Festival India); 7 April 2017
- Running time: 134 Minutes
- Country: India
- Language: Hindi

Blue Mountains: A Modern Day Classic is a 2015 Bollywood drama film, written and directed by Suman Ganguli, & produced by Raujesh Kumar Jain. The film stars Ranvir Shorey, Gracy Singh, Rajpal Yadav, Simran Sharma, Arif Zakaria, Mahesh Thakur, Yatharth Ratnum.

The movie released in India on 7 April 2017.

== Plot ==
Som, a hill-town boy, accidentally selected in a singing reality TV show. Som’s mother, a celebrity singer of yesteryear, starts dreaming of materializing her unfulfilled dreams through her son, Som is pushed into the vortex of 'making of a celebrity singer', by everyone, from the sleepy hamlet. But Som's conquest for stardom ends faster than it had begun. He returns to his hometown unceremoniously. Once a dreamer of the Blue Mountains, Som sinks in the abyss of lowest self-esteem. Som's parents, close friends, his school teachers and well wishers take up the Herculean task of retrieving the titanic of Som's morale. But clutching the lineage of music, he comes out victorious, returning to the old prototype of the hill town brat, scaling the highs of his blue mountains once again. Blue Mountains is for those who have not made it to the final of any 'talent hunt contest' - called life.

== Awards ==
The film won the awards at the 2015 Golden Elephant trophy : Best Feature Film Blue Mountains movie won the awards at the 2016 Nashik Film Festival trophy : Best Director and Best Director of photography The film won the awards at the 2016 Hyderabad Film Festival: Best Feature Film

Summary of Awards

- Winner: Best Feature Film at the 19th International Children’s Film Festival
- Winner: Special Festival Mention at the 4th Indian Cine Film Festival
- Winner: Special Jury Award at the 2nd International Film Festival Shimla
- Winner: Best Director at the 8th Nashik International Film Festival
- Winner: Best Cinematography at the 8th Nashik International Film Festival
- Winner: Best Children’s Film at the 1st Haryana International Film Festival
- Winner: Best Supporting Actor at the 1st Haryana International Film Festival
- Winner: Best Editor at the 1st Haryana International Film Festival

== Cast ==
- Ranvir Shorey as Om Mehra
- Gracy Singh as Vaani Mehra
- Rajpal Yadav as Damodar
- Simran Sharma as Oshin
- Arif Zakaria as Mr. Mathews
- Mahesh Thakur as Prakash
- Yatharth Ratnum as Som Mehra
- Sanjeev Rathore
- Vaibhav Hanshu as Akks
- Lisa-Marie Rettenbacher as Hansini
- Lamira Faro as Mother of Hansini
- Rishabh Sharma as Humpty
- Mehul Kapadia
- Raujesh Kumar Jain Special Appearance

== Music ==
1. " Bheeni Bheeni Bhor" - Sadhana Sargam, Suraj Jagan, Yatharth Ratnum
2. "Get Set Go" - Shaan
3. "Kaare Kaare Badra" - Shreya Ghoshal
4. "Shanno" - Sunidhi Chauhan
5. "Vote Do" - Kailash Kher
