= Sarja (film) =

- Theatrical release poster
- Directed by: Rajdutt
- Screenplay by: Yashwant Rajankar
- Story by: Babasaheb Purandare
- Produced by: Seema Deo
- Starring: Ajinkya Deo; Pooja Pawar; Seema Deo; Nilu Phule; Kuldeep Pawar; Ramesh Deo; Ravindra Mahajani
- Cinematography: Jaywant Pathare
- Edited by: Vaman Guru
- Music by: Hridaynath Mangeshkar
- Production company: Dattatray Chitra
- Release date: 1987
- Running time: 127 minutes
- Country: India
- Language: Marathi

Sarja is a 1987 Indian Marathi-language film, based on a novel Shelar Khind by Marathi writer Babasaheb Purandare. It is directed by Rajdutt and produced by Dattatray Chitra. The film stars Ajinkya Deo, Pooja Pawar (debut), Seema Deo and Nilu Phule. It also features Kuldeep Pawar, Ramesh Deo and Ravindra Mahajani in key roles. Sarja is a story of a young brave man and his wife, who assist Maratha King Chatrapati Shivaji Maharaj and his forces in capturing a fort from a Mughal Sardar.

Sarja has received many accolades including the National Film Award for Best Feature Film in Marathi for the year 1987, for its patriotic vigour in the retelling of a story set during the turbulent times of Chatrapati Shivaji Maharaj's Swarajya.

== Plot ==
The Mughal emperor Aurangzeb orders his forces to march south towards the Maratha kingdom. Maratha King Chatrapati Shivaji Maharaj agrees for a truce with the Mughals. As a part of the treaty, Chatrapati Shivaji Maharaj handovers many forts to Mughals. In a vicinity of one such fort, live a Dombari widow Gauri Dombarin (Seema Deo) and her daughter Kastura, who earn their livelihood by performing various acrobatic street stunts. A newly appointed Mughal Sardar (Kuldeep Pawar) of the fort is attracted to Kasturi and he tries to win her over with the help of local leader Rustom (Nilu Phule). However, both Kastura and her mother flee to Chatrapati Shivaji Maharaj's, where they take refuge in a house of a distant relative. It is revealed that as a child, Kastura was married to Sarja (Ajinkya Deo) a son of the distant relative. A romantic relationship blossoms between Kastura and Sarja, and they consummate their childhood marriage. However, the aid of the Mughal Sardar, Rustom finds the new hideout of Kastura, and tries to kidnap her. Sarja rescues her only with timely help of brave men from the village. This incidence, however deeply disturbs the Sarja and as a result he tries to join Chatrapati Shivaji Maharaj's army, but is ridiculed by the villagers due to his inability to protect his own wife. In mean time, to test fortification of his newly commenced fort capital Raigad, Chatrapati Shivaji Maharaj announces an award for any one who could climb the fort without using its gates. Sarja sees this as a golden opportunity to meet Shivaji Maharaj and join his army. Sarja with a help of Kastura climbs up the most treacherous inclines to reach the top of the fort and is awarded by Chatrapati Shivaji Maharaj. To strengthen his forts in south, the Aurangzeb sends a few long range cannons to the captured forts in South. Chatrapati Shivaji Maharaj see this as a major threat to his kingdom and orders his chief-of-spy Bahirji Naik (Ramesh Deo) to stop cannons from reaching the fort. Bahirji Naik with the help of Sarja tries to incapacitate the cannons on their route to the fort but fails, and Sarja gets captured. Kastura then with help of Naik frees the Sarja by diverting attention of the fort guards by her thrilling acrobatic stunt over a rope joining two bastions housing long range cannons and subsequently incapacitating the cannons. Sarja then helps the Chatrapati Shivaji Maharaj forces to capture the fort.

== Cast ==
- Ravindra Mahajani as Chatrapati Shivaji Maharaj
- Ajinkya Deo as Sarja
- Pooja Pawar as Kastura
- Seema Deo as Gauri Dombarin, Kastura's mother
- Nilu Phule as Rustam
- Kuldeep Pawar as Mughal Sardar
- Ramesh Deo as Bahirji Naik

== Soundtrack ==
The music was composed by Hridaynath Mangeshkar, and the lyrics were penned by Namdeo Dhondo Mahanor. "Chimb pavsan raan zhala abadani" became huge popular and it is the evergreen song from this album.

=== Track list ===
No.	Title	Singer(s)
1.	"Chimb pavsan raan zhala abadani"	Lata MageshKar, Suresh Wadkar
2.	"Mi katyatun chalun thakle"	Lata MageshKar, Suresh Wadkar
3	"Mohe Naihar Se Ab"	Lata Mangeshkar
