= Archana Joglekar =

Indian actress (born 1963)

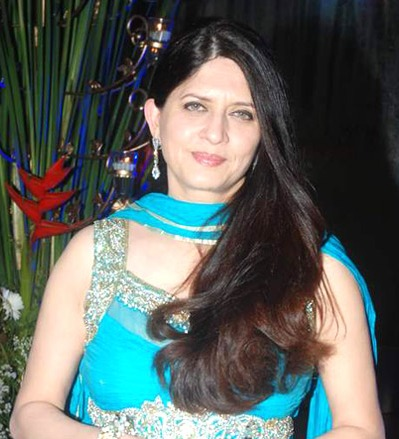
- Born: 4 January 1965 (age 61); Mumbai, Maharashtra, India
- Occupations: Classical dancer, actress
- Years active: 1987–2012
- Spouse: Nirmal Mulye (m. 1999)
- Children: 1

Archana Joglekar (born 4 January 1965) is an Indian actress and classical dancer. She has acted in Marathi, Odia and Hindi films and also in television serials. Some of her noted films are Sansar (Hindi), Nivdung (1989),Eka Peksha Ek(1990) (Marathi) and Anapekshit (Marathi). She is a Kathak dancer and choreographer. She was trained in Kathak by her mother, Asha Joglekar, a Kathak dancer and instructor. In 1963, her mother founded a dance school in Mumbai called Archana Nrityalaya. In 1999, Joglekar opened a branch of this dance school in New Jersey, US.

== Career ==
She made her debut in Marathi films with Khichdi and gained recognition with the superhit Marathi movie Ardhangi. She was cast opposite Ajinkya Deo In Ardhangi.

She was known for her roles in Odia, Marathi, and Hindi movies. She also starred alongside Arun Govil in Phoolwanti and Nitish Bharadwaj in Anpekshit.

The actress made her mark in the movie Sansar alongside Rekha, Raj Babbar, and Anupam Kher. Her role as Rajni in the film earned her recognition. She also appeared in other Hindi movies like Mardangi, Aatank Hi Aatank, and Aag Se Khelenge. Her work extended to Marathi cinema, with praise for her performances in Eka Peksha Ek and Anpekshit. She won best actress Maharashtra state award for film Anpekshit.

She also appeared on television shows, with roles in serials like Chunauti, Karmabhoomi, Chahat Aur Nafrat, and Kissa Shanti Ka. She then disappeared from the silver screen.

== Filmography ==
=== Films ===
Year	Title	Role	Language	Notes
1985	Khichdi	Hema	Marathi	
1985	Ardhangi	Archana	Marathi	
1987	Mardon Mein Mard	Sheela	Hindi	
1987	Sansar	Rajni Sharma-Fernandez	Hindi	
1988	Suna Chadhei	Bandana (Binni) Das	Odia	
1988	Rangat Sangat	Geeta	Marathi	
1988	Mardangi	Sona Singh	Hindi	
1989	Billoo Badshah	Nisha T. Mirchandani	Hindi	
1989	Aag Se Khelenge	Sunita	Hindi	
1989	Nivdung	Chitra	Marathi	
1990	Jibansangee		Bengali	
1990	Maa Kasam Badla Loonga	Sikander / Roopa	Hindi	
1990	Eka Peksha Ek	Sona	Marathi	
1991	Baat Hai Pyaar Ki	Anjali	Hindi	
1991	Anpekshit	Meghana Varde	Marathi	
1993	Aakanksha	Manju	Marathi	
1995	Mogamul	Yamuna	Tamil	
1995	Aatank Hi Aatank	Razia Pathan	Hindi	
1998	Stree	Barsha	Odia	
2012	Married 2 America	Anjali Malhotra	Hindi	

=== Television ===
Year	Title	Role	Ref.
1987	Chunauti	Archana	
1990	Karmabhoomi	Sakina	
1992	Phoolwanti	Phoolwanti	
1995	Kissa Shanti Ka	Shanti	
1999	Chahat Aur Nafrat	Pooja	

== Controversy ==
While filming a movie in Odisha on November 30, 1997, Joglekar was the victim of an attempted rape. The police made an arrest on December 1, 1997. In April 2010, a court in Bhubaneswar sentenced the perpetrator to 18 months in jail.
