= In the Name of Tai =

In The Name of Tai
- Theatrical release poster
- Directed by: Ujjwal V. Thengdi
- Written by: Ujjwal V. Thengdi
- Produced by: Ujjwal V. Thengdi
- Starring: Nishiganda Wad; Asrani; Vilas Ujawne
- Cinematography: Ajay Arya
- Edited by: Dilip Kotalgi
- Music by: Ujjwal V. Thengdi
- Production company: Oum Films
- Release date: 12 October 2012
- Country: India
- Language: Hindi

In The Name of Tai (Hindi: इन द नेम आफ ताई, "Tai" translates to "elder sister" in Marathi) is a Bollywood film directed by Ujjwal V. Thengdi and starring Nishiganda Wad, Asrani, Vilas Ujawane, Mahesh Thakur, Parag Ajgaonkar and Thengdi.

== Plot ==
The film is a female-orientated story based on a dreadful tragedy of a dedicated and educated village woman, respectfully known as Tai, who chooses a valiant but perilous avenue. She suffers sexually as well as psychologically in her personal life, yet altruistically battles for a common cause of protecting acres of land owned by the village farmers and deprived poverty stricken village community from the clutches of the corridor of power, builders, and politicians.

== Cast ==
- Nishiganda Wad as Sandhya Purshottam (Tai)
- Vilas Ujawane as Vilas (Minister)
- Ujjwal V. Thengdi as Subodh Ji
- Suzanne Bernert as best friend of Tai
- Asrani as Sanjiv
- Kalpesh Mehta as Builder
- Parag Ajgaonkar as Purshottam
- Babita (Palvie) as Jani
- Mahesh Thakur as Mahesh
- Amruta Kasbekar as Amruta
- Raquel Rebello as Shilpa Dancer sister

In the Name of Tai

Soundtrack album by Ujjwal V. Thengdi
- Released: September 2012
- Genre: Film soundtrack
