= Sansar (1987 film) =

1987 Indian Hindi-language film

- Poster
- Directed by: T. Rama Rao
- Story by: Visu
- Based on: Samsaram Adhu Minsaram (Tamil) by Visu
- Produced by: A. Purnachandra Rao
- Starring: Rekha; Raj Babbar; Anupam Kher; Aruna Irani; Archana Joglekar; Shekhar Suman; Ajinkya Deo
- Cinematography: M. V. Raghu
- Edited by: V. Balasubramaniam; J. Krishnaswamy
- Music by: Laxmikant Pyarelal
- Production company: Lakshmi Productions
- Release date: 3 April 1987
- Country: India
- Language: Hindi

Sansar (transl. World) is a 1987 Indian Hindi-language drama film directed by T. Rama Rao, starring Rekha, Raj Babbar and Anupam Kher in addition to Aruna Irani, Archana Joglekar, Shekhar Suman, Priyanka, Chandrashekhar, Shafi Inamdar, Ajinkya Deo, Dinesh Hingoo and Seema Deo. The film is a remake of the Tamil film Samsaram Adhu Minsaram.

== Plot ==
The film is based on the turmoils of the family of a postmaster. The film presents the rift between the family due to clash of egos among the children and their parents.

The family consists of the father Deendayal (Anupam Kher), his wife Godavari (Seema Deo), his older son Vijay (Raj Babbar) a government employee with his wife Uma (Rekha), second son Shiva (Ajinkya Deo), a car mechanic, the youngest son Vidyasagar (Harish), is struggling to clear school, and their daughter Rajni (Archana Joglekar) who is also working with a private company.

Rajni rejects a prospective candidate of her marriage and declares that she wants to marry a Christian man Peter (Shekhar Suman) who works in her office, although not before the family of the groom, accepting Shiva for their daughter Basanti (Priyanka). Rajni has her way despite pleads from her family, and the parents also reluctantly agree after meeting the family of the boy who turns out to be from an educated and cultured family.

Basanti agrees to help Vidyasagar with his studies, this however takes on a toll on her married life because of the time devoted on Vidyasagar. This leads her to abruptly leave for her father's home without informing her husband's family, making matters worse. Shiva brings her back, but things don't really improve between them.

Uma is pregnant and leaves for her mother's home and returns after a few months with the baby.

In her absence, Rajni has argument with Peter and her father-in-law (Shafi Inamdar) over trivial issues, one day she quits her job and angrily returns home.

Vijay complains to her mother in giving his share of money to the family, claiming that now his family is going to expand and he might not be able to contribute further. His father casually dismisses it, claiming that Shiva contributes the same amount despite earning less than Vijay. The argument escalates to involve Rajni and Basanti as well. It ends with Deendayal asking Vijay to leave his house, upon which Vijay declares that he gave 18000 rupees for Rajni's wedding, he wants it back and would happily leave the house. A heartbroken Deendayal asks his wife to draw a line between the house, restricting his family to have any contact with Vijay. The rest of the family does not dare defy the decision of the father. To take matters further, Deendayal takes voluntary retirement, to collect his funds early, and starts working in double shifts at a shop and as a security guard to pay off the amount asked by Vijay. Uma returns to find the line dividing the house. She teams up with the house maid Gangubai (Aruna Irani) and Godavari to bring the family together.

== Cast ==
- Rekha as Uma Sharma
- Raj Babbar as Vijay Kumar Sharma
- Anupam Kher as Dindayal Sharma
- Aruna Irani as Gangu Bai
- Seema Deo as Godavari
- Archana Joglekar as Rajni
- Priyanka as Basanti
- Chandrashekhar as Jagmohan Das
- Shafi Inamdar as Albert Fernandes
- Shekhar Suman as Peter Fernandes
- Ajinkya Deo as Shiva Sharma
- Dinesh Hingoo as Pandit
- Harish as Vidyasagar

== Production ==
Dilip Kumar and Jaya Prada were originally cast as the lead of Sansar, playing Deendayal and Uma, respectively. However, Anupam Kher and Rekha replaced them.

== Soundtrack ==
The songs were written by Anand Bakshi and set to music by Laxmikant-Pyarelal.

Song	Singer
"Yeh Sansar Hai"	S. P. Balasubrahmanyam
"Sari Umar Main"	S. P. Balasubrahmanyam
"Main Aaj Bahut Khush Hoon, Aaj Bahut Khush Hoon"	S. P. Balasubrahmanyam, Kavita Krishnamurthy, Suresh Wadkar
"Radha Rani"	Anuradha Paudwal
"Soja Soja"	Anuradha Paudwal
