= Kudumbapuranam =

- Poster
- Directed by: Sathyan Anthikad
- Story by: AK Lohithadas
- Based on: Samsaram Adhu Minsaram
- Produced by: Mathew George
- Starring: Thilakan; Balachandra Menon; Ambika; K. P. A. C. Lalitha; Parvathy; Sreenivasan
- Cinematography: Vipin Mohan
- Edited by: K. Rajagopal
- Music by: Johnson (score); Mohan Sitara (songs)
- Production company: Central Pictures
- Release date: 14 April 1988
- Country: India
- Language: Malayalam

Kudumbapuranam (transl. Family History) is a 1988 Indian Malayalam-language drama film, written by Lohithadas and directed by Sathyan Anthikad. The film stars Thilakan, Balachandra Menon, Ambika, K. P. A. C. Lalitha, Parvathy, and Sreenivasan in major roles. It is a remake of the 1986 Tamil film Samsaram Adhu Minsaram, directed by Visu.

The film revolves around the strained relationship of a father and son in a middle-class Malayalee family. The film highlights the circumstances the family goes through after the son raises questions about the division of family expenditure after he becomes an earning member of the family, disregarding the hardships his parents have gone through to raise him and other members of the family.

== Plot ==
The film revolves around a middle-class family. Problems arise when the eldest son alienates his father and is expelled from their home. The film portrays the other members struggling between the two.

Sankaran Nair, is leading a happy retired life with his wife Ammini and his children Krishnanunni, Preman, Rema and Gopu. Krishnanunni is working in a bank and is married to Geetha. Preman is working as a drama artist and Rema and Gopu are studying. Sankaran Nair's close friend wished to get his son, Murali, married to Rema. When the families decide to get them married, Rema disagrees and conveys that her Malayalam lecturer, Sivan, is in love with her and she wishes to marry him. Initially, her family is against Rema's wish, later agrees seeing that Sivan is financially sound. Sankaran is still worried that he is not able to fulfill his deceased friend's wish. Although Murali is heartbroken to hear this, he suggests that Preman marries his sister Indu, thus fulfilling their wish. The marriages happen with Krishnanunni's financial aide. Geetha is now pregnant. All in the family are happy to hear about this. Sankaran Nair and Ammini are delighted about their grand-parenthood. As per the custom, Geetha moves to her parents' home during the seventh month of her pregnancy. Meanwhile, there are sparks in both Sivan-Rema's and Preman-Indu's married life. One day, Indu leaves to her place after a fight with Preman. And the same time, Rema comes to her home after differences with her mother-in-law Bhageerathiyamma and fight with Sivan. Murali does not entertain Indu's stubbornness and asks her to return to Preman's house. Rema is also stubborn and not ready to go back to Sivan's house. Krishnanunni is not really happy about this. Next day Krishnanunni gives money to his mother, which is less than the usual amount. When Ammini asks about this, he responds that since his wife is not at home, the expenditure will be comparatively less. And he also conveys that he is not happy about Rema's and Indu's stubbornness. To this, Sankaran Nair responds that he doesn't have the right to comment about his brother's wife. Krishnanunni also mentions that Preman contributes comparatively less amount of money towards the family expenses since he is only a drama artist with no permanent job to which Sankaran Nair replies that Preman spents all his earnings for his family unlike Krishnanunni who offers only a calculated amount, thus in his eyes Preman is much above than his eldest son Krishnanunni. This conversation creates a rift between Sankaran Nair and Krishnanunni. Sankaran Nair says that this family doesn't need any financial support from Krishnanunni from now. In that case, Krishnanunni wants back all the money that he have spend on the family, especially the twenty five thousand rupees that he has spent for Rema's marriage. Sankaran Nair says he will return all the money and asks Krishnanunni to move out of the house. Krishnanunni is equally headstrong and shifts to the house adjacent to his place. Preman tries to settle the dispute between his father and brother, but fails. Sankaran Nair starts working as a lorry driver to earn money. Although his health is deteriorating, he is strong-willed about his aim. One day, Geetha's uncle, Achuthan, informs Sankaran Nair that Geetha delivered a baby boy almost a week ago. Sankaran Nair and Ammini are happy to hear this, but equally sad that Krishnanunni never informed them about this. Krishnanunni, Geetha and their son comes to their new home. Kunjamma is appointed as the caretaker. Krishnanunni is struggling to manage financial stuff at his place. And Geetha mocks him about how stringent he used to be when spending money. Meanwhile, Geetha meets Sivan and learns that his mother has been hospitalised after fracturing her leg. After this, Geetha advises Rema to go back to Sivan and thus Rema and Siva are happily back together. Another instance when Geetha mocks about Krishnanunni's misery, Krishnanunni retorts that he never did all these for his own good, but for his family. Krishnanunni understands his mistake. Meanwhile, Sankaran Nair has earned enough money to return to Krishnanunni and he asks Krishnanunni to move out from his house. To this, Ammini asks Sankaran Nair how he will be able to not be with his grandchild. Sankaran Nair's heart melts and he forgives Krishnanunni. The family reunites. Geetha suggest that they better shift so that their intimacy is never abridged.

== Cast ==
- Thilakan as Sankaran Nair
- Balachandra Menon as Krishnanunni, Sankaran Nair's eldest son
- Sreenivasan as Preman Vadakkummuri, Sankaran Nair's second son
- Ambika as Geetha, Krishnanunni's wife
- K. P. A. C. Lalitha as Ammini, Sankaran Nair's wife
- Parvathy as Rema, Sankaran Nair's daughter
- Syama as Indu, Preman's wife
- Manianpilla Raju as Murali, Indu's brother
- Sreenath as Sivan, Rema's husband
- Baiju as Gopu, Sankaran Nair's youngest son
- Philomina as Kunjamma, servant
- Oduvil Unnikrishnan as Achuthan, Geetha's uncle
- Sukumari as Thrikkunnathu Bhageerathiyamma, Rama's mother-in-law
- Santhakumari as Devaki Murali's and Indu's mother

== Soundtrack ==
The music was composed by Mohan Sithara and the lyrics were written by Kaithapram.

| Song | Singers |
|---|---|
| "Thaalolam" | K. J. Yesudas, K. S. Chithra |
| "Thaalolam" | K. S. Chithra |
| "Thappo Thappo" | K. J. Yesudas, Chorus |
