= Nache Nagin Gali Gali =

- Directed by: Mohanji Prasad
- Written by: K.B Phatak; S. M. Abbas
- Produced by: B.K Jaiswal
- Starring: Nitish Bhardwaj; Meenakshi Seshadri; Satyendra Kapoor; Sadashiv Amrapurkar; Suhas Joshi
- Narrated by: S. M. Abbas
- Cinematography: N.V Shrivastav
- Music by: Kalyanji Anandji
- Release date: 1989
- Running time: 2 Hour 11 Min
- Country: India
- Language: Hindi

Nache Nagin Gali Gali is a 1989 Bollywood drama film directed by Mohanji Prasad starring Meenakshi Seshadri, Nitish Bharadwaj, Asha Lata, Satyendra Kapoor, Sadashiv Amrapurkar and Suhas Joshi.

== Cast ==
- Meenakshi Seshadri as Mohini
- Nitish Bhardwaj as Nagesh/Kamal(double role)
- Sahila Chadha as Roop
- Sadashiv Amrapurkar as Tantrik Narsinghdev
- Satyen Kappu as Gurudev, Mentor of Narsinghdev
- Yunus Parvez as Shera Pahalwan
- Vikas Anand as Roop's Father
- Shriram Lagoo as Kamal's Father
- Shantipriya as cameo appearance in a song
- Kunika as cameo appearance in a song
- Paintal
- Dinesh Hingoo as Doctor

== Music ==
Naache Nagin Gali Gali

Soundtrack album by Kalyanji-Anandji
- Released: 1989
- Genre: Feature film soundtrack
- Length: 20:07
- Language: Hindi
- Label: His Master's Voice
- Producer: B.K Jaiswal

The music for Naache Nagin Gali Gali is composed by Kalyanji–Anandji while the lyrics are penned by Anjaan.

#	Title	Singer(s)
1	"Nache Nagin Gali Gali"	Sadhana Sargam
2	"Mile Manse Yeh Mann"	Sadhana Sargam, Nitin Mukesh
3	"Jaise Bhi Tu Maanega Mana Loongi Saawariya"	Alka Yagnik
4	"Kaise Din Beete Koi Jatan Bataja O Mitwa"	Sadhana Sargam
5	Mile Manse Yeh Mann v2	Sadhana Sargam, Nitin Mukesh
6	"Tum Kya Aaye Duniya Badal Gayi"	Sadhana Sargam, Udit Narayan
7	"Yaar Mila Pyar Mila"	Sadhana Sargam
