= Nagpur Adhiveshan =

- Poster
- Directed by: Nilesh Raosaheb Jalamkar
- Starring: Makarand Anaspure; Ajinkya Deo; Mohan Joshi; Bharat Ganeshpure
- Cinematography: Chandrkant Meher
- Music by: Amit Tale
- Release date: 9 December 2016
- Country: India
- Language: Marathi

Nagpur Adhiveshan is a 2016 Indian Marathi-language film directed by Nilesh Raosaheb Jalamkar and produced Anil Keshavrao, Jalamkar Yayati Naik. starring Makarand Anaspure, Ajinkya Deo, Mohan Joshi and Bharat Ganeshpure. It was released theatrically on 9 December 2016.

== Synopsis ==
Two officials face a challenge while organizing an annual political event, Nagpur Adhiveshan, in Nagpur. Things take a turn when a politician plans another rally, Chalo Nagpur, against the wishes of other politicians.

== Cast ==
- Makarand Anaspure
- Ajinkya Deo
- Mohan Joshi
- Bharat Ganeshpure
- Sankarshan Karhade
- Vinit Bonde
- Chetan Dalvi
- Amol Tale
- Deepali Jagtap
- Sneha Chavan

== Reception ==
Mukund Kule from Maharashtra Times wrote "Mohan Joshi, who has always played a solid role, played the role of the boss very well. The rest of the film's music and cinematography are not very noteworthy". Mihir Bhanage from The Times of India says "Nagpur Adhiveshan ends up trying too hard to make people laugh. It does evoke a few laughs but over time, you lose interest. In trying to make the perfect recipe for a satire, the film overcooks the preparation. And as they say, too many cooks...". Ganesh Matkari from Pune Mirror wrote "The film’s release in the middle of demonetisation drive has ensured that there are no other contenders, making it the incidental frontrunner in Marathi cinema this week. If this doesn’t help the film’s performance, nothing will!".
