= Aag Se Khelenge =

1989 Indian Hindi film

- Poster
- Directed by: Bhaskar Shetty
- Written by: Anwar Khan (dialogues)
- Screenplay by: Sachin Bhowmick
- Story by: Sachin Bhowmick
- Produced by: Pravesh Sippy
- Starring: Jeetendra; Anil Kapoor; Meenakshi Sheshadri; Kimi Katkar
- Cinematography: Kamalakar Rao
- Edited by: Waman Bhonsle; Gurudutt Shirali
- Music by: R. D. Burman
- Production company: Pravesh Productions
- Distributed by: N. N. Sippy Productions
- Release date: 15 September 1989
- Running time: 151 minutes
- Country: India
- Language: Hindi

Aag Se Khelenge (transl. We will play with fire) is a 1989 Hindi-language action film, produced by Pravesh Sippy under the N. N. Sippy Productions banner and directed by Bhaskar Shetty. It starred Jeetendra, Anil Kapoor, Meenakshi Sheshadri, Kimi Katkar in pivotal roles, with the music composed by R. D. Burman.

== Cast ==
- Jeetendra as Inspector Shekhar Kapoor
- Anil Kapoor as Raja Saxena / Johny
- Meenakshi Sheshadri as Geeta
- Kimi Katkar as Barkha / Bijli
- Shakti Kapoor as Shaka
- Amrish Puri as Zaka
- Raj Kiran as Inspector Rakesh
- Archana Joglekar as Sunita
- Satish Kaushik as Inspector Pardesi
- Sharat Saxena as Rony D'Souza
- Vikas Anand as Police Commissioner Mohanlal Shrivastav
- Girija Shankar as Inspector Ravi Saxena
- Sarala Yeolekar as Sharda Saxena
- Baby Guddu as Pinky Saxena
- Arshad Warsi as Background Dancer

== Soundtrack ==
The music of the film was given by R. D. Burman and lyrics were by Anand Bakshi. The following songs are in the movie:-

Song	Singer
"Meri Patli Kamar"	Asha Bhosle, Mohammed Aziz
"Tere Naina"	Asha Bhosle, Amit Kumar
"Help Me"	Asha Bhosle, Amit Kumar
"Mere Sajan"	Asha Bhosle, Amit Kumar
"Chhede Been Sapera, Naache Naagan Kaali"	Asha Bhosle, Amit Kumar, Kavita Krishnamurthy, Udit Narayan
