= Ajinkya Deo =

Indian actor

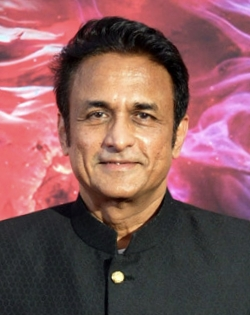
- Ajinkya Deo c. 2026
- Born: 17 January 1965 (age 61); Mumbai, Maharashtra, India
- Occupation: Actor
- Years active: 1985–present
- Spouse: Aarti Deo (m. 1987)
- Parent(s): Ramesh Deo; Seema Deo
- Family: Deo family

Ajinkya Deo (born 17 January 1965) is an Indian actor in Marathi films and is the son of veteran Marathi actor Ramesh Deo and Seema Deo. He is the prominent figure in Marathi Cinema. He appeared over 85 movies in Hindi and Marathi languages. He is the recipient of Maharashtra State Film Award for Best Actor.

He made his debut with a role in the Superhit Marathi movie Ardhangi (1985) opposite Archana Joglekar. He emerged as a star with Sarja (1987) and went on to establish himself with his roles in the action films Shabas Sunbai (1986), Jeeva Sakha (1991), Ghayal (1993), Bajrangachi Kamal (1994) and Vishwavinayak (1994). Deo's other commercially successful films include Majha Ghar Majha Sansar (1986), Sansar (1987), Kashyasathi Premasathi (1987), Maherchi Sadi (1991), Bandhan (1991), Lapandav (1993), Vajwa Re Vajwa (1993), Kunku (1994), Sarkarnama (1998), Tuch Mazi Suhasini (1999) and Vasudev Balwant Phadke (2007). Deo played supporting roles in Jeta (2010), Ringa Ringa (2010), Dubhang (2011), Sau Shashi Deodhar (2014), Raakhandaar (2014), Nati (2014), Tanhaji (2020) and Gharat Ganpati (2024).

== Early life ==
Deo was born on 17 January 1964 in Mumbai. He belongs to a family with deep roots in the Indian film industry; he is the son of veteran actors Ramesh Deo and Seema Deo. His younger brother, Abhinay Deo, is a well-known film director.

During his childhood, while his parents were occupied with their professional commitments, Deo was primarily raised by his grandmother and maternal uncle. Growing up in an environment centered around cinema allowed him to observe the industry closely. Drawing from this background and a natural inclination toward the performing arts, he chose to follow his parents' career path. He made his professional acting debut in 1984 with the film Ardhangi.

== Career ==
=== Early Marathi films (1985–1990) ===
Deo began his acting career with the Marathi film Ardhangi (1985), directed by Rajdutt. He continued his association with the filmmaker in Mazhe Ghar Mazha Sansar (1986), while also appearing in Prabhakar Pendharkar's Shabas Sunbai the same year. In 1987, Deo reunited with Rajdutt for Sarja. The year also marked his debut in Hindi cinema with Sansar, in which he portrayed Shiva Sharma. He additionally appeared in Pitambar Kale's Marathi film Kashasathi Premasathi.

In 1988, Deo expanded his presence in Hindi cinema with a role in Sone Pe Suhaaga, featuring an ensemble cast. The following year, he appeared in the Marathi film Rickshawali (1989). In 1990, Deo acted in the Hindi films Pyasi Nigahen and Nagin, continuing to work across both Marathi and Hindi cinema during the early phase of his career.

=== Breakthrough and Hindi debut (1991–1999) ===
Deo achieved a major breakthrough in 1991 with the Marathi family drama Maherchi Sadi, in which he portrayed Vicky. The film emerged as one of the biggest commercial successes in Marathi cinema history at the time and became a cultural phenomenon, significantly increasing his popularity among audiences. The same year, he appeared in Anant Mane's Bandhan and played the lead role of Jeeva in Jeeva Sakha, directed by his father, Ramesh Deo, marking their first collaboration as actor and director.

In 1992, Deo appeared in the Marathi films Vajva Re Vajva and Jagavegli Paij, continuing to establish himself as a leading actor in Marathi cinema. The following year, he expanded his presence in Hindi films with roles in Parwane, Phool Aur Angaar and Meherbaan. In Marathi cinema, he featured in Shrabani Deodhar's Lapandav as well as Bala Jo Jo Re and Ghayaal. In 1994, Deo worked with Sachin Pilgaonkar for the first time in Kunku. The same year, he appeared in Kumar Sohoni's Bajrangachi Kamal, Vishwavinayak and Chal Gammat Karu, while also acting in Ashok Gaikwad's Hindi film Fauj. In 1995, he continued working in both industries with appearances in the Hindi films Paandav and Sauda, alongside the Marathi film Vahinichi Maya.

In 1996, Deo appeared in the Hindi film Chhota Sa Ghar. The year also marked his debut in Telugu cinema with Deyyam and his English-language film debut with The Peacock Spring. After a brief absence from film releases in 1997, he returned in 1998 with a role in Shrabani Deodhar's political drama Sarkarnama. In 1999, he appeared in the Hindi film Gair and the Marathi film Tuch Majhi Suhasini.

=== Historical roles and later work (2001–2010) ===
In 2001, Deo appeared in the Marathi films Avgat, portraying Ramakant, and Sangharsh Jeevanacha, in which he played Vijay. Deo was also the executive director of Prabhat Entertainment TV channel. The channel operated from 2000 to 2002. Following a brief hiatus from major film appearances, he returned in 2004 with roles in the Hindi action film Aan: Men at Work, where he portrayed a police officer, and the Marathi film Tujhyachsathi. In 2005, Deo appeared in the Hindi film Mr Ya Miss and the Marathi film Sawal Majha Premacha, continuing to work across both Hindi and Marathi cinema.

A significant milestone in his career came in 2007 when he portrayed Indian freedom fighter Vasudev Balwant Phadke in the biographical film Ek Krantiveer: Vasudev Balwant Phadke. His performance received critical acclaim and earned him the Maharashtra State Film Award for Best Actor. After another brief hiatus, He returned to Marathi cinema in 2010 with roles in Sanjay Jadhav's Ringa Ringa and Jeta, marking his continued presence in the industry through character-driven roles.

=== Character roles (2011–present) ===
In 2011, Deo collaborated with filmmaker Mahesh Kothare for the first time in Dubhang. After a brief break, he returned in 2013 with a role as a RAW agent in the Hindi thriller David and appeared as Ramesh in the Marathi film Thoda Tujha Thoda Majha. In 2014, he featured in several Marathi films, including Sau Shashi Deodhar, Bhatukali, Nati and Raakhandaar. The following year, he appeared in Shinma, Marg Majha Aekla and Sugar Salt Ani Prem. In 2016, he acted in the political drama Nagpur Adhiveshan.

After a gap from major film releases, Deo appeared in the Hindi film Bombairiya (2019) and made an appearance in the English-language historical drama The Warrior Queen of Jhansi, portraying Tatya Tope. In 2020, he played Chandraji Pisal in the historical action film Tanhaji. He continued his work in Marathi cinema with Zol Zaal (2022). In 2023, he appeared in the Hindi film Kisi Ka Bhai Kisi Ki Jaan, starring Salman Khan, portraying a Chief Minister. The following year, he played Sharad Gharat in the Marathi family drama Gharat Ganpati.

In 2025, He appeared in the Marathi films Tu Mee Ani Amaira and Asa Mee Ashi Mee, opposite Tejashri Pradhan. The same year, he featured in Farhan Akhtar's war film 120 Bahadur, portraying a brigade commander.

=== Collaborations ===
He has worked with noted Film director's such as Rajdutt, Kumar Sohoni, Sachin Pilgaonkar, Shrabani Deodhar, Prabhakar Pendharkar, Anant Mane, Girish Ghanekar, Sanjay Jadhav and Om Raut. His chemistry with top Marathi actress of 80s and 90s were appreciated, he done Films with Ashwini Bhave, Varsha Usgaonkar, Nishigandha Wad, Archana Joglekar, Nivedita Saraf and Kishori Shahane.

== Personal life ==
Deo married his long time girlfriend, Aarti Deo, in 1987. He has two children, a son, Arya Deo, and a daughter, Tanaya Deo. Arya has worked in the film industry as an assistant director.

His daughter Tanaya has special needs. Inspired by his family's experiences, Hes been associated with initiatives supporting children with special needs and has been involved in establishing educational facilities aimed at their development and care.

== Filmography ==
=== Films ===
Year	Title	Role	Language	Notes
1985	Ardhangi	Ajinkya	Marathi	
1986	Mazhe Ghar Mazha Sansar	Prasad Sane	Marathi	
1986	Shabas Sunbai	Ajinkya Inamdar	Marathi	
1987	Sarja	Sarja	Marathi	Maharashtra State Film Award for Best Actor
1987	Sansaar	Shiva Sharma	Hindi	
1987	Kashyasathi Premasathi	Abhay Mohite	Marathi	
1987	Kachchi Kali	Arun	Hindi	
1988	Sone Pe Suhaaga	Dr. Prem	Hindi	
1989	Rickshawali	Amar	Marathi	
1990	Pyasi Nigahen	Inspector Vijay	Hindi	
1990	Nagin	Dr. Ajay	Hindi	
1991	Indrajeet	Unnamed	Hindi	Cameo appearance
1991	Maherchi Sadi	Vicky	Marathi	
1991	Bandhan	Mohan	Marathi	
1991	Aata Hoti Geli Kuthe	Ajinkya	Marathi	
1991	Jeeva Sakha	Jeeva	Marathi	
1991	Jasa Baap Tashi Poore	Shekhar Thorat	Marathi	
1992	Vajwa Re Vajwa	Akash	Marathi	
1992	Jagawegli Paij	Rohit Sarkar	Marathi	
1993	Parwane	Aslam	Hindi	
1993	Phool Aur Angaar	Adhikari	Hindi	
1993	Meherbaan	Vikram	Hindi	
1993	Lapandav	Vikram 'Vicky' Malgude	Marathi	
1993	Poraka	Ajinkya	Marathi	
1993	Bala Jo Jo Re	Vishal Naik	Marathi	Remake of Hindi movie Sanjog
1993	Ghayaal	Ajit Hirey	Marathi	
1994	Kunku	Dr. Ram Inamdar	Marathi	
1994	Soodchakra	Gurunath	Marathi	
1994	Bajrangachi Kamal	Inspector Vikram Shinde	Marathi	
1994	Mayechi Savli	Arun Velankar	Marathi	
1994	Vishwavinayak	Shankar	Marathi	
1994	Chal Gammat Karu	Vikram	Marathi	
1994	Fauj	Samanth	Hindi	
1995	Paandav	Captain Vikas Sood	Hindi	
1995	Sauda	Madan	Hindi	
1995	Paijan	Janardhan Kaundinya (JK)	Marathi	
1995	Vahinichi Maya	Dr. Rajesh	Marathi	
1996	Chhota Sa Ghar	Vikas	Hindi	
1996	Deyyam	Murali	Telugu	
1996	The Peacock Spring	Vikram Singh	English	TV movie
1998	Sarkarnama	Vishvas Salunkhe	Marathi	
1998	Shandhyug	Hari	Marathi	
1999	Gair	Raj Oberoi	Hindi	
1999	Tuch Majhi Suhasini	Suhasini's Husband	Marathi	Screen Awards Nominated Best Actor
2001	Avgat	Ramakant Narvekar aka Ramya	Marathi	
2001	Sangharsh Jeevanacha	Vijay	Marathi	
2004	Aan: Men at Work	Police Officer Kelkar	Hindi	
2004	Tujhyachsathi	Nikhil	Marathi	
2005	Mr Ya Miss	Bhagwan Shiv	Hindi	
2005	Sawal Majhya Premacha	Pratap Babasaheb Nimbalkar	Marathi	
2007	Ek Krantiveer: Vasudev Balwant Phadke	Vasudev Balwant Phadke	Marathi	Maharashtra State Film Award for Best Actor
2010	Ringa Ringa	Rangrao	Marathi	
2010	Jeta	Vikram	Marathi	Cameo appearance
2011	Dubhang	Sujit	Marathi	
2011	Don Ghadincha Daav	Umesh Sontakke	Marathi	
2013	David	RAW Agent	Hindi	Special appearance
2013	Thoda Tujha Thoda Majha	Ramesh	Marathi	
2013	24 (Indian TV series)	Abhay Gupta / Kartik	Hindi	
2014	Sau Shashi Deodhar	Dr. Ajinkya Vartak	Marathi	
2014	Bhatukali	Shrikant Deshmukh	Marathi	
2014	Nati	Mahesh Chandorkar	Marathi	
2014	Raakhandaar	Khushaba	Marathi	
2015	Shinma	Director Vasu	Marathi	
2015	Marg Majha Akeyla	Ajinkya	Marathi	
2015	Sugar Salt Ani Prem	Ajay	Marathi	
2016	Nagpur Adhiveshan	Prataprao	Marathi	
2019	Bombairiya	Police commissioner Wadia	Hindi	
2019	The Warrior Queen of Jhansi	Tatya Tope	English	
2020	Tanhaji	Chandraji Pisal	Hindi	
2022	Zol Zal	Inspector Abhimanyu Shinde	Marathi	
2023	Kisi Ka Bhai Kisi Ki Jaan	Chief Minister Kelkar Surve	Hindi	
2024	Gharat Ganpati	Sharad Gharat	Marathi	
2025	Tu, Me Ani Amaira	Shubhankar	Marathi	
2025	120 Bahadur	Brigade Commander	Hindi	
2025	Asa Mee Ashi Mee	Vaibhav Rajadhyaksha	Marathi	
2026	Prahaar: The Untold Story of Ujjwal Nikam	Bipin Naria	Hindi	
2026	Ramayana: Rise of Legend †	Vishvamitra	Hindi	

=== Television ===
Year	Title	Role	Language	Notes
1995	Sailaab	Avinash	Hindi	
1996	Zee Horror Show	Ajinkya	Hindi	Episodic role
1998	Rishtey		Hindi	
1998	Nagin	Ajay	Hindi	
2005	Kohinoor	Mr. Shinde	Hindi	
2013	Asava Sundar Swapnancha Bangla		Marathi	
2013	24	Kartik Chandrashekar / Abhay Gupta	Hindi	
2021	Jai Bhawani Jai Shivaji	Baji Prabhu Deshpande	Marathi	
2026	Brown	Dheeraj Jaiswal	Hindi	
