= Baat Hai Pyaar Ki =

Baat Hai Pyaar Ki is a 1991 Bollywood film starring Archana Joglekar and Sadashiv Amrapurkar.It also includes the Starcast like Sulabha Deshpande, Shreeram Lagoo. It has gained a review of 2 out of 5 stars.

== Soundtrack ==
#	Song title	Singer(s)
1	"Guftagu Yaar Ki"	Anuradha Paudwal, Manhar Udhas
2	"Jab Se Tere Pyaar"	Anuradha Paudwal, Manhar Udhas
3	"Preet Adhuri"	Asha Bhosle
4	"Sab Kuch Hai Duniya"	Anuradha Paudwal
5	"Shikwa Bhi Nahi"	Asha Bhosle
