= Uravukku Kai Koduppom =

1975 film by Y. G. Mahendran

- Poster
- Directed by: Y. G. Mahendran
- Screenplay by: K. S. Gopalakrishnan
- Based on: Uravukku Kai Koduppom by Visu
- Produced by: K. S. Gopalakrishnan
- Starring: Gemini Ganesan; Sowcar Janaki
- Cinematography: P. Ramasami
- Edited by: R. Devarajan
- Music by: D. B. Ramachandran; S. P. Venkatesh
- Production company: Chitra Productions
- Release date: 28 March 1975
- Country: India
- Language: Tamil

Uravukku Kai Koduppom (transl. We shall give a helping hand to blood relatives) is a 1975 Indian Tamil-language drama film directed by Y. G. Mahendran, produced and written by K. S. Gopalakrishnan. It is based on Visu's play of the same name, also directed by Mahendran. The film stars Gemini Ganesan and Sowcar Janaki. It was released on 28 March 1975, and failed at the box office, although the story was reused by Visu for Samsaram Adhu Minsaram in 1986.

== Cast ==
- Gemini Ganesan
- Sowcar Janaki
- V. Raghavan
- Nagesh

== Production ==
Uravukku Kai Koduppom was the first play written by Visu, and directed by Y. G. Mahendran. K. S. Gopalakrishnan bought the rights to adapt the play into a film with the same name; besides producing the film under Chitra Productions, he also wrote the screenplay. Mahendran was retained as director, with Gopalakrishnan as supervising director.

== Soundtrack ==
The soundtrack was composed by D. B. Ramachandran and S. P. Venkatesh, with lyrics by A. Maruthakasi.

Track listing
No.	Title	Singer(s)	Length
1.	"Koduppom Kai Koduppom"	Sirkazhi Govindarajan
2.	"Thiruvennum Peyarukku Uriyavale"	P. Susheela, Madhuri, T. K. Kala
3.	"Oru Kodi Aasaigal Uyir Moochin"	Sirkazhi Govindarajan, Vani Jairam

== Release and reception ==
Uravukku Kai Koduppom was released on 28 March 1975, and failed commercially. Kanthan of Kalki criticised the film for omitting the entertaining parts of the play, and Mahendran's direction. Despite the film's failure, the story was reused by Visu for the 1986 film Samsaram Adhu Minsaram.
