= Nishigandha Wad =

Indian actress (born 1969)

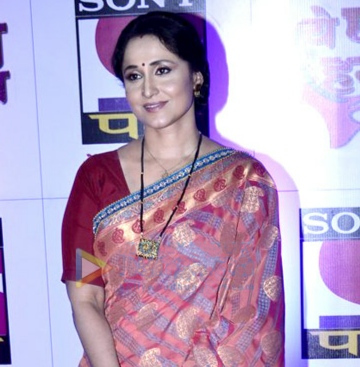
- Wad in 2020
- Born: 11 October 1969 (age 57); Bombay, Maharashtra, India
- Other name: Dr. Nishigandha Wad
- Occupations: Actress; author; social scientist
- Years active: 1982–present
- Spouse: Deepak Dewoolkar (m. 1991)
- Children: 1

Nishigandha Wad (pronounced [n̪iʃiɡən̪d̪ʱaː ʋaːɖ]; born 11 October 1969) is an Indian actress and author known for her work in Marathi cinema, television, and theatre, while also appearing in Hindi films and television. With a career spanning more than three decades, she became a prominent presence in Marathi cinema during the 1990s, particularly known for portraying strong and independent female characters, and later established a parallel career in Hindi television.

Wad began performing as a child in Marathi stage productions before making her television debut in the serial Aavhan, which brought her early recognition. She entered Hindi films with Salim Langde Pe Mat Ro (1989) and made her Marathi film debut opposite Ashok Saraf in Sachin Pilgaonkar's Eka Peksha Ek, going on to appear in films such as Shejari Shejari (1990), Bandhan (1991), Bala Jo Jo Re (1993), and Sada Haldi Kunkwacha (1997) as well as more than twenty-five television serials, including Kulvadhu (2008–2010). From the 2000s, she broadened her work in Hindi film and television, with roles in Tumko Na Bhool Paayenge (2002), the long-running serial Sasural Simar Ka (2011–2018), Wazir (2016), and Race 3 (2018), and later played Jijabai in the historical serial Jai Bhavani Jai Shivaji (2021) and the film Har Har Mahadev (2022). She has since continued to work in Hindi television, including Suman Indori (2024–2025) and O Humnava Tum Dena Saath Mera (2026).

Alongside her acting career, Wad has pursued academic research extensively, completing a PhD from the University of Mumbai in 2003 on the changing role of women in Marathi and British theatre, and a second PhD in 2013 on women's empowerment; she is currently pursuing a third doctorate on the poetry of Shanta Shelke. In addition, she has authored several Marathi-language books, three of which have received Maharashtra state literary awards.

== Early life ==
Nishigandha Wad was born on 11 October 1969 in Bombay (now Mumbai), Maharashtra, to the writer Vijaya Wad and Dr. Vijay Wad. She has a younger sister, Prajakta, who works as a medical professional. Raised in a household with strong literary and academic leanings, Wad took an early interest in acting, taking part in cultural programmes and school plays while studying in primary school.

Her performances at inter-school drama competitions earned her recognition during her school years, and while in the sixth standard she received a National Scholarship for Dramatics from the Department of Culture, Government of India. She trained at a theatre workshop conducted by the actress Sulabha Deshpande and subsequently appeared in stage productions including Durga Zhali Gauri and Mukhwata, directed by Amol Palekar. She also received training in classical Kathak from veteran K. Rajkumar. During her secondary schooling, she also acted in commercial Marathi plays such as Premachya Gava Jaave, Moruchi Mavshi and Asa Ghadla Kasa.

Alongside her early theatrical pursuits, Wad was a strong academic performer, ranking 44th in the state in her Secondary School Certificate (SSC) examination and third in her Higher Secondary Certificate (HSC) examination.

== Career ==
Wad was noticed by Atmaram Bhende in 1987, who gave her a television break with his directorial Marathi serial Aavhan, written by Jaywant Dalvi, in which she played Veena; the serial went on to become a major success, earning her several Best Actress honours in the years that followed. In 1989, she made her Hindi film debut with a role in Saeed Akhtar Mirza's Salim Langde Pe Mat Ro.

Wad made her Marathi film debut in 1990 with Sachin Pilgaonkar's comedy Eka Peksha Ek, followed by Shejari Shejari the same year, both of which starred her opposite Ashok Saraf. She subsequently appeared in leading roles in films such as Bandhan (1991), Vaat Pahate Punvechi (1992), Wajva Re Wajva (1993), Premankur (1993) and Topi Var Topi (1994). In 1993, Wad starred opposite Ajinkya Deo in Bala Jo Jo Re, a Marathi remake of the 1985 Hindi film Sanjog, and also portrayed Maharani Tarabai, the courageous Maratha queen who led the Maratha Empire against Mughal emperor Aurangzeb, in Dinkar D. Patil’s historical film Shivrayachi Soon Tararani. During this period, she also appeared in supporting roles in Hindi films such as Pratikar (1991) and Karm Yodha (1992).

In the mid-1990s, Wad expanded her television career with shows such as Daastaan, which was filmed in the United Arab Emirates, and Aakhir Kaun. She also appeared in episodic roles in popular television series including Zee Horror Show, Saturday Suspense, X Zone and Star Bestsellers. She continued to work in Marathi cinema through the late 1990s and early 2000s, appearing in films such as Sada Haldi Kunkwacha (1997), Rang Premacha (1998), Pathrakhin (1999), Navra Majhya Muthit Ga (2000), Hrudaysparshi (2000), and He Khel Nashibache (2001), often portraying strong, independent female characters alongside actors such as Ashok Saraf, Ajinkya Deo, Ramesh Bhatkar and Ashok Shinde.

From the early 2000s, Wad explored further into Hindi cinema and television, increasingly taking on supporting and character roles. She played Salman Khan’s mother in Tumko Na Bhool Paayenge and Ameesha Patel’s caring aunt in Aap Mujhe Achche Lagne Lage, and went on to portray mother and elder roles in several Hindi films. In 2006, she starred in the Marathi drama Akhand Saubhagyawati, directed and produced by her husband, Deepak Deulkar. Around the same period, she gained wider recognition for her performance in Zee Marathi’s popular daily soap Kulvadhu, alongside Milind Gunaji, Poorva Gokhale and Subodh Bhave. In 2012, she took on one of her few Hindi film lead roles in the drama In the Name of Tai, in which she played Tai, a courageous village lawyer who fights against powerful builders and politicians to protect her community’s land. Although the film received mixed reviews, her performance was praised, with The Times of India noting that Wad brought dignity to the film.

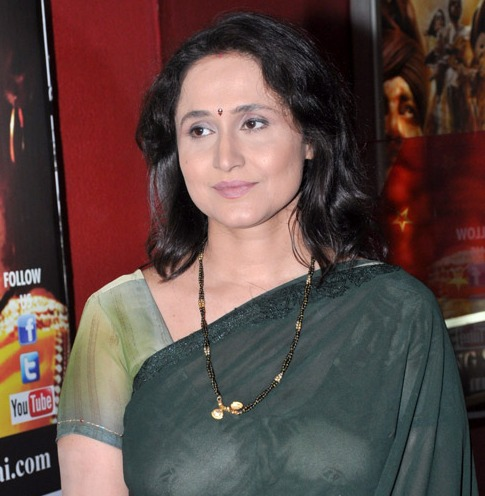
Wad in 2011

The 2010s were largely dominated by her television work. Wad appeared in the long-running Hindi serial Sasural Simar Ka (2011–2016), playing Sujata Bharadwaj, and later featured in Sajda Tere Pyaar Mein (2012), Khushiyon Kii Gullak Aashi (2014) and Savitri Devi College & Hospital (2017–2018). On the film front, she played Aditi Rao Hydari’s mother in the Hindi thriller Wazir (2016) and later portrayed Anil Kapoor’s wife in the action film Race 3 (2018).

In 2021, Wad returned to Marathi television after nearly a decade away from the medium, taking on the role of Rajmata Jijau in the Star Pravah's historical serial Jai Bhavani Jai Shivaji. The following year, she reprised the role in Abhijeet Deshpande’s historical action film Har Har Mahadev, which grossed around ₹25 crore (US$2.6 million) and became the third-highest-grossing Marathi film of 2022. Wad later played Hina Akhtar, a strong-willed and traditional woman whose past actions become central to Ghazal’s quest for revenge, in the Hindi serial Rabb Se Hai Dua (2023–2024) and subsequently joined the Colors TV family drama Suman Indori (2024–2025), where she played a senior member of the Mittal family. In 2026, she appeared in the television series Mahadev & Sons as Radha Bajpai.

== Personal life and other works ==
Wad is married to actor Deepak Deulkar, known for playing Balram in the television series Shri Krishna (1993–1997). The couple, who live in Mumbai, have a daughter named Ishwari.

Wad completed a doctorate from the University of Mumbai in 2003, under the guidance of historian Varsha Shirgaonkar, with a dissertation titled Changing Role of Women in Society – Reflections from Marathi and British Theatres. In a 2021 interview, Wad said she had gone on to pursue two further doctorates, one on women's empowerment beginning in 2013 and another, then in progress, on the poetry of Shantabai Shelke. Alongside acting, she has authored several Marathi-language books, some of which have received state literary honours, and has spoken publicly on subjects such as women's empowerment and personal relationships. She also served as the editor of the Marathi magazine CharChoughi for more than a decade.

In December 2020, comments she made opposing same-sex marriage during an appearance on a Marathi talk show drew online criticism. She later told The Times of India that she was not homophobic and that her remarks had been misconstrued.

== Filmography ==
=== Films ===
Year	Title	Role	Language	Notes
1989	Salim Langde Pe Mat Ro	Anees	Hindi	
1990	Eka Peksha Ek	Anuradha Shinde	Marathi	
1990	Shejari Shejari	Sushila Kulkarni	Marathi	
1991	Gunehgar Kaun	Rama	Hindi	
1991	Bandhan	Pramila Jadhav	Marathi	
1991	Pratikar	Priya	Hindi	
1992	Karm Yodha	Anjali	Hindi	
1992	Anuradha	Anuradha	Marathi	
1992	Vaat Pahate Punvechi	Anjali Urangaonkar	Marathi	
1992	Gruhpravesh	Pooja	Marathi	
1993	Bala Jo Jo Re	Pooja Naik / Aarti Naik	Marathi	
1993	Wajva Re Wajva	Swati	Marathi	
1993	Shivrayanchi Soon Tararani	Maharani Tarabai Bhonsle	Marathi	
1993	Janmathep	Sandhya Bhosale	Marathi	
1993	Premankur	Krishnapriya Chiplunkar	Marathi	
1993	Porka	Savitri	Marathi	
1993	Tu Sukhkarta	Aarti	Marathi	
1994	Bajrangachi Kamal	Priya Pradhan	Marathi	
1994	Sasar Maher	Vijaya	Marathi	
1994	Janmadaata	Kunda	Marathi	
1995	Topi Var Topi	Ratna	Marathi	
1995	Painjan		Marathi	
1997	Daadagiri	Radha Sinha	Hindi	
1997	Sada Haldi Kunkwacha		Marathi	
1998	Shandhyug		Marathi	
1999	Rang Premacha	Sumati (Suma)	Marathi	
1999	Saubhagya		Marathi	
1999	Maa Kasam	Acharya's wife	Hindi	
1999	Manus	Pallavi karmarkar	Marathi	
1999	Pratidav		Marathi	
1999	Mother	Mrs. Sinha	Hindi	
1999	Pathrakhin	Naina	Marathi	
2000	Hrudaysparshi	Rashmi	Marathi	
2000	Navra Majhya Muthit Ga	Usha	Marathi	
2001	Ashi Dnyaneshwari	Sujata Kulkarni	Marathi	
2001	He Khel Nashibache		Marathi	
2002	Deewangee	Dhristi	Hindi	
2002	Tumko Na Bhool Paayenge	Geeta Singh Thakur	Hindi	
2002	Aap Mujhe Achche Lagne Lage	Nisha Dholakia	Hindi	
2003	Indian Babu	Thakur's wife	Hindi	
2003	Bhaubeej	Mrs Mansingh yadav	Marathi	
2004	Thoda Tum Badlo Thoda Hum	Usha	Hindi	
2004	The Hope		Hindi	
2004	Alibaba Aur 40 Chor	Razia	Hindi	
2004	Abhalachi Savli		Marathi	
2006	Akhand Saubhagyawati		Marathi	
2007	Life Mein Kabhie Kabhiee	Ramkant Chaugle	Hindi	
2008	Om Shanti: Fight for Peace		Hindi	
2010	Rokkk	Mrs. Warda	Hindi	
2010	Shaapit	Kaaya's mother	Hindi	
2012	In the Name of Tai	Sandhya Purshottam (Tai)	Hindi	
2013	Janmantar		Marathi	
2014	Sata Lota Pan Sagla Khota	Satyavan's wife	Marathi	
2015	Bhaag Johnny	Sabitri Arora	Hindi	
2015	Mala Aai Paahije		Marathi	
2016	Prem Kahani Ek Lapleli Goshta	Sujata	Marathi	
2016	Prem Sankat		Marathi	
2016	Wazir	Ruhana's mother	Hindi	
2017	Garbh		Marathi	
2017	A Daughter's Tale Pankh	Vidya	Hindi	
2018	Dr Tatya Lahane		Marathi	
2018	Atrocity		Marathi	
2018	Race 3	Sumitra Ranchod Singh	Hindi	
2020	Shaheed Bhai Kotwal	Gauru Atya	Marathi	
2021	The Unknown Number	Madhu	Hindi	Short film
2022	Aasharya		Marathi	
2022	Raada	Vahinisaheb	Marathi	
2022	Har Har Mahadev	Rajmata Jijau	Marathi	
2023	Lai Jhakaas		Marathi	
2024	Rudra		Marathi	
2024	Manmauji		Marathi	
2026	Tula Pahata	Sagar’s mother	Marathi	

=== Television ===
Year	Title	Role	Language	Network	Notes	Ref.
1987	Aavhan	Veena	Marathi	DD Sahyadri		
1990–1991	Peecha Karo	Sarita	Hindi	DD Metro		
1995–1996	Daastaan	Nishi Malhotra	Hindi	Zee TV		
1996	Aakhir Kaun	Nisha	Hindi	DD National		
1997–1998	Zee Horror Show	Poornima / Roopa / Dr. Sobha	Hindi	Zee TV	Episodic role	
1997–1998	Khamoshi		Hindi	Home TV		
1997–1998	Saturday Suspense		Hindi	Zee TV	Episodic role	
1998	X Zone	Rajni Sharma	Hindi	Zee TV	Episodic role	
1999	Star Bestsellers		Hindi	StarPlus	Episodic role	
2002	Ujala		Hindi	DD National		
2003–2004	Kabhie Kabhie	Aapa	Hindi	Zee TV	Episodic role	
2004	Chaudah Phere		Hindi	Doordarshan		
2004–2005	Pyaar Ki Kashti Mein		Hindi	STAR One		
2005	CID Special Bureau	Mamata Somnath Khanna	Hindi	SET	Episodic role	
2006–2009	Ssshhhh... Phir Koi Hai	Neha Puri	Hindi	Star One		
2007	Sautela	Shakuntala Arya	Hindi	DD National		
2008	Waqt Batayega Kaun Apna Kaun Paraya	Sunanda	Hindi	SET		
2008–2010	Kulvadhu	Priyadarshini Rajeshirke	Marathi	Zee Marathi		
2009–2010	Tuz Ni Maz Ghar Shrimantach	Anusuya Waman Deshmukh	Marathi	Star Pravah		
2010–2011	Matti Ki Banno	Janaki Singh	Hindi	Colors TV		
2011–2016	Sasural Simar Ka	Sujata Bharadwaj	Hindi	Colors TV		
2012	Sajda Tere Pyaar Mein	Mrs. Chauhan	Hindi	StarPlus		
2014	Khushiyon Kii Gullak Aashi	Prabha	Hindi	Sony PAL		
2016	Amma	Lakshmi Shetty	Hindi	Zee TV		
2017–2018	Savitri Devi College & Hospital	Savitri Malhotra	Hindi	Colors TV		
2019	Meri Gudiya	Parvati Gujral	Hindi	Star Bharat		
2019	Pratibha Ani Pratima	Host	Marathi	DD Sahyadri		
2021	Jay Bhawani Jay Shivaji	Rajmata Jijau	Marathi	Star Pravah		
2022	Kabhi Kabhie Ittefaq Sey	Sargam Kulshreshth	Hindi	StarPlus		
2022–2024	Rabb Se Hai Dua	Hina Akhtar	Hindi	Zee TV		
2022	Side effects	Principal	Hindi	Movieflex		
2024–2025	Suman Indori	Geetanjali Mittal	Hindi	Colors TV		
2025	Jamai No. 1	Uma Dikshit Srivastav	Hindi	Zee TV		
2026	Mahadev & Sons	Radharani "Radha" Bajpai	Hindi	Colors TV		
2026–present	Oh Humnava Tum Dena Saath Mera	Sudha Bharadwaj	Hindi	StarPlus		

=== Theatre ===
- Durga Zhali Gauri
- Mukhwata
- Premachya Gava Jaave
- Moruchi Mavshi
- Asa Ghadla Kasa
- Kunitari Aahe Tithe
- Vasuchi Sasu

== Bibliography ==
- Ivalu Tivalu
- Phulpankhi
- Anushka
- Gandh Nishigandhacha

== Accolades ==
- 1984: Best Children's Literature honour by Government of Maharashtra for the children's poetry collection Ivalu Tivalu
- 1991: Best Literature award by Government of Maharashtra for the book Phulpankhi
- 1993: Best Literature award by Government of Maharashtra for the poetry collection Anushka
- 2003: Smita Patil Award for Excellence in Acting
- 2015: Kalagaurav Puraskar by Kalarang Cultural Institute, Pimpri-Chinchwad for Contribution to Marathi Cinema
- 2021: Suryadatta Stree Shakti National Awards
