= List of songs recorded by Sadhana Sargam =

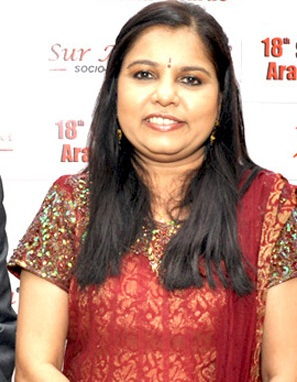
- Sargam posing for a Photo at a show
- Category: Songs
| Hindi Film Songs | 1050 |
| Hindi Non-Film songs | 3 |
| Bengali Film Songs | 229 |
| Bengali Non-Film Songs | - |
| Telugu Film Songs | 80 |
| Tamil Film Songs | 203 |
| Malayalam Songs | 4 |
| Punjabi Songs | 1 |
| Marathi Film Songs | 65 |
| Kannada Film Songs | 14 |
| Gurajati Film Songs | 23 |
| Nepali Film Songs | 7 |
| Assamese Songs | 1 |
| Odia Film Songs | 32 |
| Odia Non-film Songs | 18 |
| Bhojpuri Film Songs | 6 |
| Rajasthani Film Songs | 1 |
| Television Songs | 6 |
| Total | 1743 |

Sadhana Sargam is an Indian singer, whose voice has been extensively recorded for thousands of tracks in Indian cinema. In addition to being a renowned playback singer, she is also a trained Hindustani classical singer who has recorded hundreds of bhajans, ghazals, and other spiritual tracks. She, has to her credit, won a National Film Award, two Filmfare Awards, five Maharashtra State Film Awards, four Gujarat State Film Awards, and one Orissa State Film Award. She has recorded more than 15000 songs in 36 regional languages.

Multilingual playback singer Sadhana Sargam has recorded numerous private albums and songs. Below are her mainstream Hindi, Marathi, Tamil, Telugu, Kannada and Malayalam record lists. She has also released thousands of devotional Hindu albums including Gajanana, Aartiyan, Shri Sai Mantra, Shri Ram Mantra and Jai Ambe Maa to name a few. Her 2015 Sai bhajan "Sai Ram Sai Shyam" has found immense popularity among devotees.

== Hindi films ==
=== 1978 ===
| Film | No | Song | Composer(s) | Writer(s) | Co-artist(s) | Note(s) |
|---|---|---|---|---|---|---|
| Raja Rani Ko Chahiye Pasina | 1 | "Atkan Chatkan" | Sharang Dev | Vasant Dev | | Credited as Sadhana Ghanekar |
| Raja Rani Ko Chahiye Pasina | 2 | "Jungle Mein Mangal Hoga" | Sharang Dev | Vasant Dev | | Credited as Sadhana Ghanekar |
| Raja Rani Ko Chahiye Pasina | 3 | "Paseena Paseena" | Sharang Dev | Vasant Dev | | Credited as Sadhana Ghanekar |

=== 1982 ===
| Film | No | Song | Composer(s) | Writer(s) | Co-artist(s) |
|---|---|---|---|---|---|
| Rustom | 4 | "Jeena Koi Khel Nahi"(Female) | Kalyanji–Anandji | Anand Bakshi | |
| Rustom | 5 | "Door Nahin Rehna" | Kalyanji–Anandji | Anand Bakshi | |
| Vidhaata | 6 | "Saat Saheliyan" | Kalyanji–Anandji | Anand Bakshi | Hemlata, Kishore Kumar, Anuradha Paudwal, Alka Yagnik, Shivangi Kolhapure, Padmini Kolhapure, Kanchan |

=== 1983 ===
| Film | No | Song | Composer(s) | Writer(s) | Co-artist(s) |
|---|---|---|---|---|---|
| Ghungroo | 7 | "Pyar Ke Dhage" | Kalyanji–Anandji | | |
| Ghungroo | 8 | "Tere Daras Ke Pyase" | Kalyanji–Anandji | | |
| Ghungroo | 9 | "Tere Daras Ke Pyase"(Reprise) | Kalyanji–Anandji | | |
| Kalaakaar | 10 | "Neele Neele Ambar Par" (Female) | Kalyanji–Anandji | Indeevar | |
| Kalaakaar | 11 | "Surajmukhi Mukhda Tera" | Kalyanji–Anandji | Indeevar | Suresh Wadkar |
| Nastik | 12 | "Sagre Jagat Ka Ek Rakhwala" (Female) | Kalyanji–Anandji | | Alka Yagnik |

=== 1984 ===
| Film | No | Song | Composer(s) | Writer(s) | Co-artist(s) |
|---|---|---|---|---|---|
| Bandh Honth | 13 | "Hum Dono Ikrar Kar Len" | Kalyanji–Anandji | | |
| Raaj Tilak | 14 | "Julm Ho Gaya Re" | Kalyanji–Anandji | | Kishore Kumar, Alka Yagnik |
| Raaj Tilak | 15 | "Aa Gaye, Aa Gaye" | Kalyanji–Anandji | | Kishore Kumar, Alka Yagnik, Anuradha Paudwal |

=== 1985 ===
| Film | No | Song | Composer(s) | Writer(s) | Co-artist(s) |
|---|---|---|---|---|---|
| Ek Chitthi Pyar Bhari | 16 | "Shadi Karke Bhi Mai Hu Kawaanra" | Kalyanji–Anandji | | Suresh Wadkar |
| Karishma Kudrat Kaa | 17 | "Tere Vadon Pe" | Kalyanji–Anandji | | |
| Karishma Kudrat Kaa | 18 | "Dil Mein Paheli" | Kalyanji–Anandji | | Anwar |
| Karishma Kudrat Kaa | 19 | "Ek Din Milkar" | Kalyanji–Anandji | | Manhar Udhas |
| Karishma Kudrat Kaa | 20 | "Hum Dono Hain" | Kalyanji–Anandji | | Suresh Wadkar |
| Karishma Kudrat Kaa | 21 | "Kahin Tu Woh To Nahin" | Kalyanji–Anandji | | Udit Narayan |
| Pighalta Aasman | 22 | "Humse Na Sahi"(Female) | Kalyanji–Anandji | Indeevar | Alka Yagnik |
| Pighalta Aasman | 23 | "Jab Yeh Dil Ho Jawan" | Kalyanji–Anandji | Anjaan | |
| Pighalta Aasman | 24 | "Jiya Nahin"(Happy) | Kalyanji–Anandji | Ila Arun | |
| Pighalta Aasman | 25 | "Jiya Nahin"(Sad) | Kalyanji–Anandji | Ila Arun | |
| Yeh Hai Muqaddar Ka Sikandar | 26 | "Balkhati Boondon" | Ilaiyaraaja | | |
| Yeh Hai Muqaddar Ka Sikandar | 27 | "Piya Sun" | Ilaiyaraaja | | |
| Yudh | 28 | "Doston Tum Sabko" | Kalyanji–Anandji | | Amit Kumar, Shailendra Singh |

=== 1986 ===
| Film | No | Song | Composer(s) | Writer(s) | Co-artist(s) |
|---|---|---|---|---|---|
| Baat Ban Jaye | 29 | "Mera Roop Rang" | Kalyanji–Anandji | Anand Bakshi | |
| Janbaaz | 30 | "Har Kisi Ko Nahi Milta"(Female) | Kalyanji–Anandji | | |
| Janbaaz | 31 | "Har Kisi Ko Nahi Milta"(Duet) | Kalyanji–Anandji | | Manhar Udhas |
| Nasihat | 32 | "Mera Mann Dekhe Sapna" | Kalyanji–Anandji | | |
| Naya Naya Pyar | 33 | "College Mein Aana Sikha" | Kalyanji–Anandji | | |
| Naya Naya Pyar | 34 | "Naya Naya Pyar" | Kalyanji–Anandji | | |
| Naya Naya Pyar | 35 | "Ye Duniya Ka" | Kalyanji–Anandji | | |
| Pahunche Huwey Log | 36 | "Ji Karta Hai" | Kalyanji–Anandji | | |
| Raat Ke Baad | 37 | "Duniya Hai Duniya" | Kalyanji–Anandji | | |
| Raat Ke Baad | 38 | "Gulshan Gulshan"(Female) | Kalyanji–Anandji | | |
| Raat Ke Baad | 39 | "Har Koi Pareshaan" | Kalyanji–Anandji | | |
| Sultanat | 40 | "Nazar Ne Nazar Se Kya Kaha Meri Jaan Yeh Bata" | Kalyanji–Anandji | | Suresh Wadkar |

=== 1987 ===
| Film | No | Song | Composer(s) | Writer(s) | Co-artist(s) |
|---|---|---|---|---|---|
| Imaandaar | 41 | "Mitwa Tu Hai Kahan" | Kalyanji–Anandji | | Suresh Wadkar, Alka Yagnik |
| Jhanjhaar | 42 | "Shantu Re" | Kalyanji–Anandji | Vishwamitra Adil | Suresh Wadkar |
| Jhanjhaar | 43 | "Dekho Humse" | Kalyanji–Anandji | Vishwamitra Adil | Suresh Wadkar |
| Jhanjhaar | 44 | "Boli Boli Pinjre" | Kalyanji–Anandji | Vishwamitra Adil | |
| Jhanjhaar | 45 | "Aage Bhi Dushman" | Kalyanji–Anandji | Vishwamitra Adil | Suresh Wadkar |
| Kaash | 46 | "Jahanwale Ne Sab Kuch Hai Rachaya Jadu Se" | Rajesh Roshan | Faruq Qaiser | Kishore Kumar |
| Kalyug Aur Ramayan | 47 | "Yug Yug Tak Dukh Saha" | Kalyanji–Anandji | Verma Malik | |
| Khudgarz | 48 | "Yahin Kahi Jiyara" | Rajesh Roshan | | Nitin Mukesh |
| Khudgarz | 48 | "Log Kehate Hain Ke" | Rajesh Roshan | | Mohammed Aziz |
| Khudgarz | 50 | "Aap Ke Aa Jaane" | Rajesh Roshan | | Mohammed Aziz |

=== 1988 ===
| Film | No | Song | Composer(s) | Writer(s) | Co-artist(s) |
|---|---|---|---|---|---|
| Afsar | 52 | "Itt Jaun Utt Jaun" | Kalyanji–Anandji | | |
| Dariya Dil | 53 | "Barse Re Sawan" | Rajesh Roshan | Indeevar | Mohammed Aziz |
| Dariya Dil | 54 | "Tu Mera Superman" | Rajesh Roshan | Indeevar | Mohammed Aziz |
| Dharamyudh | 55 | "Saari Duniya" | Rajesh Roshan | | |
| Gangaa Jamunaa Saraswati | 56 | "Chudiya Khanaki" | Anu Malik | Indeevar | |
| Geeta Ki Saugandh | 57 | "Geeta Ki Saugandh" | Anwar - Usman | | |
| Geeta Ki Saugandh | 58 | "Kasam Hai Yeh" | Anwar - Usman | | |
| Geeta Ki Saugandh | 59 | "Jaan Me Hai" | Anwar - Usman | | |
| Geeta Ki Saugandh | 60 | "Jaan Me"(Sad) | Anwar - Usman | | |
| Jungle Ki Beti | 61 | "Hungama Hoga Hungama" | Rajesh Roshan | | |
| Kabzaa | 62 | "Dil Ki Adalat, Pyar Ka Muqadma" | Rajesh Roshan | Anand Bakshi | Mohammed Aziz |
| Khoon Bhari Maang | 63 | "Hanste Hanste Kat Jaayen Raaste"(Duet) | Rajesh Roshan | | Nitin Mukesh |
| Khoon Bhari Maang | 64 | "Main Haseena Ghazab Ki" | Rajesh Roshan | | Asha Bhosle |
| Khoon Bhari Maang | 65 | "Main Teri Hoon Jaanam" | Rajesh Roshan | | |
| Khoon Bhari Maang | 66 | "Hanste Hanste"(Female) | Rajesh Roshan | | |
| Maar Dhaad | 67 | "Michael Ke Adda" | Rajesh Roshan | | |
| Maar Dhaad | 68 | "Pagal Mann Mera" | Rajesh Roshan | | |
| Maar Dhaad | 69 | "Sun Le Haseena" | Rajesh Roshan | | |
| Mahaveera | 70 | "Mujhe Tukar Tukar Na Dekh" | Kalyanji–Anandji | | |
| Mohabbat Ke Dushman | 71 | "Na Teer Se Maaro" | Kalyanji–Anandji | | Suresh Wadkar, Alka Yagnik |
| Qatil | 72 | "Bolo Miss Kiss Ke Liye" | Laxmikant-Pyarelal | Sameer | Shabbir Kumar |
| Qatil | 73 | "Maan Gaye Maan Gaye" | Laxmikant-Pyarelal | Sameer | Shabbir Kumar |
| Rukhsat | 74 | "Tera Mera Pyar Amar" | Kalyanji–Anandji | | Suresh Wadkar |
| Rukhsat | 75 | "Diwana Main Hoon Tera" | Kalyanji–Anandji | | Kishore Kumar |
| Rukhsat | 76 | "O Sanam Tere Siva Apna" | Kalyanji–Anandji | | |
| Sherni | 77 | "Gadi Gadi Chunar Sarkane Lage" | Kalyanji–Anandji | | Alka Yagnik |
| Sherni | 78 | "Tere Aane Se" | Kalyanji–Anandji | | |
| Som Mangal Shani | 79 | "Jo Kal Kare So Aaj" | Anu Malik | | |
| Tadap Aisi Bhi Hoti Hai | 80 | "Tadap Jeene Nahin Deti" | R. D. Burman | | |

=== 1989 ===
| Film | No | Song | Composer(s) | Writer(s) | Co-artist(s) |
|---|---|---|---|---|---|
| Aakhri Baazi | 81 | "Diwani Diwani" | Anu Malik | | |
| Aakhri Baazi | 82 | "Chori Chori Aap Mere" | Anu Malik | | Amit Kumar |
| Aakhri Baazi | 83 | "Hai Yeh Sama" | Anu Malik | | Amit Kumar, Suresh Wadkar |
| Anjaane Rishte | 84 | "Mud Mud Ke Na Peeche" | Anand–Milind | | Amit Kumar |
| Anjaane Rishte | 85 | "Jaao Ji Kaha Jaaoge" | Anand–Milind | | Amit Kumar |
| Anjaane Rishte | 86 | "Aur Kahan Aawaz Lagaye" | Anand–Milind | | Alka Yagnik |
| Asmaan Se Ooncha | 87 | "Kya Rokegi Duniya" | Rajesh Roshan | | Shabbir Kumar |
| Asmaan Se Ooncha | 88 | "Jiya Pyar Mange Jiya" | Rajesh Roshan | | Kumar Sanu |
| Asmaan Se Ooncha | 89 | "Oh! Jaanam Meri Sonam" | Rajesh Roshan | | Mohammed Aziz |
| Asmaan Se Ooncha | 90 | "Zindagi Se Jab Mile" | Rajesh Roshan | | Kumar Sanu, Abhijeet, Anwar Hussain, Sarika Kapoor |
| Daata | 91 | "Daata Tere Kai" | Kalyanji–Anandji | | |
| Daata | 92 | "Daata Tere Kai Naam" | Kalyanji–Anandji | | |
| Daata | 93 | "Daata Tere Kai Naam Koi Pukare" | Kalyanji–Anandji | | |
| Dav Pech | 94 | "Mai Har Janam"(Duet) | Anu Malik | | Shailendra Singh |
| Dav Pech | 95 | "Mai Har Janam"(Sad) | Anu Malik | | |
| Do Qaidi | 96 | "Hum Rahen Na Rahen" | Laxmikant–Pyarelal | | Sonali Vajpayee |
| Galiyon Ka Badshah | 97 | "Hum Galiyon Ke Aware" | Kalyanji–Anandji | | Alka Yagnik |
| Galiyon Ka Badshah | 98 | "Kya Kahun, Kya Na Kahun" | Kalyanji–Anandji | | K. J. Yesudas |
| Izhaar | 99 | "Aaj Hum Tum" | Kalyanji–Anandji | | |
| Jaadugar | 100 | "Aaye Hain Duaen Dene" | Kalyanji–Anandji | Anjaan | Kumar Sanu, Jolly Mukherjee, Sapna Mukherjee |
| Jaisi Karni Waisi Bharnii | 101 | "Aaya Aaya Yaar Ka Salam" | Rajesh Roshan | | Mohammed |
| Jaisi Karni Waisi Bharnii | 102 | "Jaisi Karni"(Duet) | Rajesh Roshan | | Nitin Mukesh |
| Jaisi Karni Waisi Bharnii | 103 | "Jaisi Karni"(Female) | Rajesh Roshan | | |
| Jaisi Karni Waisi Bharnii | 104 | "Mehke Huye" | Rajesh Roshan | | Mohammed Aziz |
| Jeevan Saat Suron Ka Sangam | 105 | "Ganga Jamuna Se Door" | R. D. Burman | Majrooh Sultanpuri | |
| Kala Bazaar | 106 | "Juma Juma Do Hi Mulaqaton Mein" | Rajesh Roshan | | Nitin Mukesh |
| Kala Bazaar | 107 | "Kehde Ye Haseenon Se" | Rajesh Roshan | | Asha Bhosle, Anwar, Kumar Sanu |
| Mohabbat Ki Hai Humne | 108 | "Mohabbat Ki Hai Humne" | Usha Khanna | Naqsh Layllpuri | Mohammed Aziz |
| Mujrim | 109 | "Daata Pyar De" | Anu Malik | | |
| Mujrim | 110 | "Naiyo Jeena Tere Bina" | Anu Malik | | Mohammed Aziz |
| Nache Nagin Gali Gali | 111 | "Nache Nagin" | Kalyanji–Anandji | Anjaan | |
| Nache Nagin Gali Gali | 112 | "Mile Manse Yeh Mann" | Kalyanji–Anandji | Anjaan | Nitin Mukesh |
| Nache Nagin Gali Gali | 113 | "Kaise Din Beete Koi" | Kalyanji–Anandji | Anjaan | |
| Nache Nagin Gali Gali | 114 | "Mile Manse Yeh Mann v2" | Kalyanji–Anandji | Anjaan | Nitin Mukesh |
| Nache Nagin Gali Gali | 115 | "Tum Kya Aaye Duniya Badal Gayi" | Kalyanji–Anandji | Anjaan | Udit Narayan |
| Nache Nagin Gali Gali | 116 | "Yaar Mila Pyar Mila" | Kalyanji–Anandji | Anjaan | |
| Parinda | 117 | "Kitni Hai Pyari" (Sad) | R. D. Burman | Khurshid Hallauri | Shantanu Mukherjee, Sagarika Mukherjee |
| Prem Jaal | 118 | "Mata Ke Dwar Par Jao" | Kalyanji–Anandji | | |
| Prem Jaal | 119 | "Hum Zindagi Ki Raah Mein" | Kalyanji–Anandji | | |
| Prem Jaal | 120 | "Raat Sapne Mein" | Kalyanji–Anandji | | |
| Rakhwala | 121 | "Kuchh Kuchh Hota Hai" | Anand–Milind | | Mohammed Aziz |
| Sahara | 122 | "Ankhon Ankhon Mein" | Kalyanji-Anandji | Anjaan | |
| Sahara | 123 | "Nasha Hi Nasha" | Kalyanji-Anandji | Anjaan | Kishore Kumar |
| Souten Ki Beti | 124 | "Main To Bas Patni Hoon Unki, Tu Saajan Ka Pyar Hai" | Vedpaal | Saawan Kumar | Anuradha Paudwal |
| Tridev | 125 | "Main Teri Mohabbat Main"(Duet) | Kalyanji–Anandji | Anand Bakshi | Mohammed Aziz |
| Tridev | 126 | "Gajar Ne Kiya Hai Ishara (Oye Oye)" | Kalyanji–Anandji | Anand Bakshi | Alka Yagnik, Sapna Mukherjee |
| Tridev | 127 | "Main Teri Mohabbat Main"(Solo) | Kalyanji–Anandji | Anand Bakshi | |
| Vardi | 128 | "Main Aansoo Aaj" | Anu Malik | Anand Bakshi | |

=== 1990 ===
| Film | No | Song | Composer(s) | Writer(s) | Co-artist(s) |
|---|---|---|---|---|---|
| Amavas Ki Raat | 129 | "Is Mehfil Mein" | Usha Khanna | | |
| Amavas Ki Raat | 130 | "Mastani Barsaat" | Usha Khanna | | |
| Bandh Darwaza | 131 | "Bheega Bheega" | Anand–Milind | | Suresh Wadkar |
| Bungalow No 666 | 132 | "Rootha Hai Manaa Lenge" | Anu Malik | | Mohammed Aziz |
| Deewana Mujh Sa Nahin | 133 | "Hum Tum Se" | Anand–Milind | | Amit Kumar |
| Deewana Mujh Sa Nahin | 134 | "Khadi Raho Baith Jao" | Anand–Milind | | Udit Narayan |
| Dil | 135 | "Hum Ne Ghar Chora Hai" | Anand–Milind | | Udit Narayan |
| Dushman | 136 | "Hoton Pe Tumse Pyar Likha Hai" | R. D. Burman | | Amit Kumar |
| Gunahon Ka Devta | 137 | "Ae Sanam"(Version ll) | Anu Malik | | Shabbir Kumar |
| Gunahon Ka Devta | 138 | "Aap Hi Se Dosti" | Anu Malik | | Anu Malik |
| Gunahon Ka Devta | 139 | "Karwa Chauth Ka Vrat" | Anu Malik | | |
| Hukum | 140 | "Aap Achche Lagte Hain" | Anand–Milind | Nawab Aarzoo | Vinod Rathod |
| Hukum | 141 | "Aap Achche Lagte Hain" (sad) | Anand–Milind | Nawab Aarzoo | Vinod Rathod |
| Jawani Zindabad | 142 | "Meri Jaan Jao Na" | Anand–Milind | | Amit Kumar |
| Jawani Zindabad | 143 | "Main Tujhe Dektha Raha" | Anand–Milind | | Udit Narayan |
| Jungle Love | 144 | "Mera Mehboob Aayega" | Anand–Milind | | |
| Jurm | 145 | "Jab Koyi Baat Bigad Jaaye" | Rajesh Roshan | | Kumar Sanu |
| Jurm | 146 | "Duniyawaale Bhi Kya Yaad Karenge" | Rajesh Roshan | | Manhar Udhas |
| Jurm | 147 | "Jab Koyi Baat Bigad Jaaye"(Version ll) | Rajesh Roshan | | Kumar Sanu |
| Jurm | 148 | "Hum Do Hamare" | Rajesh Roshan | | Amit Kumar |
| Khatarnaak | 149 | "Mandir Me Na Masjid" | Anu Malik | | |
| Kishen Kanhaiya | 150 | "Aap Ko Dekh Ke" | Rajesh Roshan | | |
| Kishen Kanhaiya | 151 | "Mere Humsafar, Beeti Baaten" | Rajesh Roshan | | |
| Kishen Kanhaiya | 152 | "Radha Bina Hai Kishan Akela, Chhod Nahin Jaana" | Rajesh Roshan | | Manhar Udhas |
| Meri Lalkaar | 153 | "Kabhi Jhatka" | Vijay Batalvi | | Nitin Mukesh |
| Meri Lalkaar | 154 | "Kabhi Jhatka"(Version ll) | Vijay Batalvi | | Nitin Mukesh |
| Muqaddar Ka Badshaah | 155 | "Jaaneman" | Viju Shah | | Amit Kumar |
| Muqaddar Ka Badshaah | 156 | "Aiko Haina" | Viju Shah | | |
| Pyar Ka Toofan | 157 | "Gali Gali Dware Dware" | Kalyanji–Anandji | | Udit Narayan |
| Pyar Ka Toofan | 158 | "Hum Tumhare Ho Gaye" | Kalyanji–Anandji | | Manhar Udhas |
| Pyar Ka Toofan | 159 | "Na Tum Amir Hoti" | Kalyanji–Anandji | | Mohammed Aziz |
| Pyar Ka Toofan | 160 | "Unche Unche Parbat" | Kalyanji–Anandji | | |
| Pyar Ka Toofan | 161 | "Unche"(Duet) | Kalyanji–Anandji | | |
| Pyar Ka Toofan | 162 | "Unche"(Female) | Kalyanji–Anandji | | |
| Sindoor Ki Awaaz | 163 | "Dale Ankhon Mein Ankhen" | Rajesh Roshan | | Udit Narayan |
| Sindoor Ki Awaaz | 164 | "Ghar Ghar Ki Ramayan" | Rajesh Roshan | | Kumar Sanu |
| Sindoor Ki Awaaz | 165 | "I Love You" | Rajesh Roshan | | Mohammed Aziz |
| Tadap | 166 | "Tadap Jeene" | R. D. Burman | | |
| Taqdeer Ka Tamasha | 167 | "Som Ho Mangal Ho" | Anand–Milind | | Amit Kumar |
| Tum Mere Ho | 168 | "Jatan Chahe"(Version l) | Anand–Milind | | Udit Narayan |
| Tum Mere Ho | 169 | "Jatan Chahe"(Version ll) | Anand–Milind | | Udit Narayan |
| Veeru Dada | 170 | "Ban Ke Aaina Aa" | Laxmikant–Pyarelal | | |
| Zahreelay | 171 | "Dhoond Rahee Thi" | Anand–Milind | | Amit Kumar |
| Zahreelay | 172 | "Batti Lal Haree Na" | Anand–Milind | | Mohammed Aziz |

=== 1991 ===
| Film | No | Song | Composer(s) | Writer(s) | Co-artist(s) |
|---|---|---|---|---|---|
| Ajooba Kudrat Ka | 173 | "Yeti I Love You" | Ajit Singh | | |
| Ajooba Kudrat Ka | 174 | "Yeti We Love You" | Ajit Singh | | |
| Ajooba Kudrat Ka | 175 | "Yeti We Love You"(Sad) | Ajit Singh | | |
| Anchal Tera Dhalka Hua | 176 | "Use Ke Khat Aaj Bhi" | Nadeem–Shravan | | |
| Begunaah | 177 | "Mohaniye Sohniye, Haan Dil Liya, Dil Diya" | Rajesh Roshan | | Kumar Sanu |
| Begunaah | 178 | "Tere Mere Pyaar Ka Aisa Naata Hai" | Rajesh Roshan | | Kishore Kumar |
| Dalapathi | 179 | "Yamuna Kinare"(Happy) | Ilaiyaraaja | | |
| Dalapathi | 180 | "Jaaneman Aaja Aaja" | Ilaiyaraaja | | Kumar Sanu |
| Dalapathi | 181 | "Sundari Yeh Jeevan Tera" | Ilaiyaraaja | | Suresh Wadkar |
| Dalapathi | 182 | "Yamuna Kinare"(Sad) | Ilaiyaraaja | | |
| Dancer | 183 | "Aao Chale Milke" | Anand–Milind | | S. P. Balasubrahmanyam |
| Dancer | 184 | "Kabhi Mandir Kabhi Pooja" | Anand–Milind | | S. P. Balasubrahmanyam, Udit Narayan |
| Dancer | 185 | "Teri Yaad Aayi" | Anand–Milind | | S. P. Balasubrahmanyam |
| Dastoor | 186 | "Aao Milan Ka Jashn Manayein" | Anand–Milind | Majrooh Sultanpuri | Abhijeet |
| Dharam Sankat | 187 | "Hum Tum Kahan Nahin Hai" | Kalyanji–Anandji | | Manhar Udhas |
| Dharam Sankat | 188 | "Kar Lo Itne Bulund" | Kalyanji–Anandji | | Mohammed Aziz, Alka Yagnik |
| Dhun | 189 | "Andheri Raat Sawan Ki Ghata" | Laxmikant-Pyarelal | Anand Bakshi | Talat Aziz |
| Do Pal | 190 | "Ye Deep Jalta Rahe" | Rajesh Roshan | | Mohammed Aziz |
| Do Pal | 191 | "Pyar Me Yeh Duree Tadpaye" | Rajesh Roshan | | Amit Kumar |
| Ganga Jamuna Ki Lalkar | 192 | "Challa Tu Le" | Vijay Bhatlva | | |
| Ghar Parivar | 193 | "Kurte Ka Kya Hai" | Kalyanji–Anandji | | Amit Kumar, Udit Narayan, Sonali Bajpayee |
| Ghar Parivar | 194 | "Rooth Raswathi" | Kalyanji–Anandji | | |
| Gunehgar Kaun | 195 | "Dil Kahe Dilbar" | R. D. Burman | | Suresh Wadkar |
| Haque | 196 | "Is Desh Ki Mitti Ki Kasam" | Anand–Milind | | Udit Narayan, Sudesh Bhonsle, Anupama Deshpande |
| Humne Pyaar Kiya | 197 | "Main Sabse Dhanwan" | Amar-Utpal | Sameer | |
| Humne Pyaar Kiya | 198 | "Main Sabse Dhanwan" (version 2) | Amar-Utpal | Sameer | |
| Jaan Se Badhkar | 199 | "Kismat Ne Yeh Kya Kar Diya" | Charles Srinivasan | | Amit Kumar |
| Jaan Se Badhkar | 200 | "Lahra Ke Chal" | Charles Srinivasan | | |
| Jaan Se Badhkar | 201 | "Pehla Pehla Pyaar" | Charles Srinivasan | | Udit Narayan |
| Jaan Se Badhkar | 202 | "Rut Yeh Bahaar Ki" | Charles Srinivasan | | Sandeep Waraich |
| Jeevan Daata | 203 | "Jo Chod Ke Dil" | Rajesh Roshan | | Mohammed Aziz |
| Jeevan Daata | 204 | "Abhi Sola Baras Me" | Rajesh Roshan | | |
| Jeevan Daata | 205 | "Bahna Pyaari" | Rajesh Roshan | | |
| Jeevan Daata | 206 | "Ahista Ahista" | Rajesh Roshan | | |
| Jungle Beauty | 207 | "Saath Tumhara" | Bappi Lahiri | | |
| Jungle Beauty | 208 | "Saath Tumhara"(Sad) | Bappi Lahiri | | |
| Jungle Queen | 209 | "Hum Tumhein"(Version l) | Anand–Milind | | Suresh Wadkar |
| Jungle Queen | 210 | "Hum Tumhein"(Version ll) | Anand–Milind | | Suresh Wadkar |
| Kalicharan | 211 | "Oh Pardesi Babu" | Kalyanji-Anandji | Anand Bakshi | |
| Karz Chukana Hai | 212 | "Andaaz Bahkne Lagte" | Rajesh Roshan | | Udit Narayan |
| Karz Chukana Hai | 213 | "Bheegi Hu Mein" | Rajesh Roshan | | Amit Kumar |
| Kasam Kali Ki | 214 | "Bolo Kya Karoon" | Kamal Kanth | | |
| Kaun Kare Kurbanie | 215 | "Hoga Na"(Solo) | Kalyanji–Anandji | | |
| Kaun Kare Kurbanie | 216 | "Hoga Na"(Duet) | Kalyanji–Anandji | | |
| Kaun Kare Kurbanie | 217 | "Hoga Na Hoga" | Kalyanji–Anandji | | |
| Kaun Kare Kurbanie | 218 | "Tu Meri Laila Mai Tera Chaila"" | Kalyanji–Anandji | | Kajal, Kumar Sanu |
| Naya Zaher | 219 | "Dilbar Mere Tere Vaaste" | Kalyanji–Anandji | | Mohammed Aziz |
| Naya Zaher | 220 | "Kabhi Kabhi Jeevan Mein" | Kalyanji–Anandji | | |
| Naya Zaher | 221 | "Nazar Nazar" | Kalyanji–Anandji | | Sonali Bajpayee |
| Pratigyabadh | 222 | "O Jaane Jaana" | Kalyanji–Anandji | | Anwar |
| Prem Qaidi | 223 | "Priyatama O Meri" | Anand–Milind | | S. P. Balasubrahmanyam |
| Saudagar | 224 | "Imli Ka Boota" | Laxmikant–Pyarelal | Anand Bakshi | Mohammed Aziz, Udit Narayan |
| Shiv Ram | 225 | "Na Shayar Na" | Rajesh Roshan | | Sudesh Bhonsle |
| Swarg Jaisaa Ghar | 226 | "Dil Bechoge Haan Lelo Jee" | Bappi Lahiri | Majrooh Sultanpuri | Kumar Sanu |
| Vishnu-Devaa | 227 | "Dil Mera Tera Hua" | Rajesh Roshan | | Amit Kumar |
| Vishnu-Devaa | 228 | "Maathe Pe Yun Lati Lehrayi" | Rajesh Roshan | | Amit Kumar |
| Yeh Hai Ghar Ki Mahabharata | 229 | "Koi Mera Ho Ke Na Ho" | Rajesh Roshan | | Amit Kumar |

=== 1992 ===
| Film | No | Song | Composer(s) | Writer(s) | Co-artist(s) |
|---|---|---|---|---|---|
| Aaj Ka Goonda Raaj | 230 | "Ek Pappi De De Muzhe" | Anand–Milind | Sameer | Abhijeet |
| Aaj Ka Goonda Raaj | 231 | "Pehle Bhi Roz" | Anand–Milind | Sameer | Abhijeet |
| Aaj Ka Goonda Raaj | 232 | "Tota Mere Tota" | Anand–Milind | Sameer | Abhijeet |
| Aarya | 233 | "Peepal Mein Chanda Atka" | | | Kumar Sanu |
| Aarya | 234 | "Yeh Dil Na Behle" | | | Kumar Sanu |
| Abhi Abhi | 235 | "Main Tera Pagal Premi" | Anand–Milind | | |
| Abhi Abhi | 236 | "Hum Dono Hain" | Anand–Milind | | |
| Abhi Abhi | 237 | "Hum Dono" | Anand–Milind | | |
| Anaam | 238 | "Hum Nasheen Dilrubaa" | Nadeem–Shravan | Sameer | Kumar Sanu |
| Bol Radha Bol | 239 | "Bol Radha Bol" | Anand–Milind | Sameer | Suresh Wadkar |
| Bol Radha Bol | 240 | "Aa Jaana Tere Bin" | Anand–Milind | Sameer | Suresh Wadkar |
| Bol Radha Bol | 241 | "Bol Radha"(Sad) | Anand–Milind | Sameer | |
| Bol Radha Bol | 242 | "Mukhda"(Theme) | Anand–Milind | Sameer | |
| Bombay Ka Raja | 243 | "Raat Barah Baje" | Rajesh Roshan | Aashiq Ibrahim | |
| Deedar | 244 | "Din Ba Din Mohabbat" | Anand–Milind | | Udit Narayan |
| Deedar | 245 | "Tera Mera Mera Tera" | Anand–Milind | | Udit Narayan |
| Deedar | 246 | "Jaanam Mere Jaanam" | Anand–Milind | | |
| Deedar | 247 | "Ab To Kahin Tere Bin" | Anand–Milind | | Udit Narayan |
| Deewana | 248 | "Teri Umeed Tera Intezar" | Nadeem–Shravan | Sameer | Kumar Sanu |
| Deewana | 249 | "Teri Is Ada Pe Sanam" | Nadeem–Shravan | Sameer | Kumar Sanu |
| Deewana | 250 | "Teri Is Ada"(Version ll) | Nadeem–Shravan | Sameer | |
| Dil Aashna Hai | 251 | "Dil Aashna Hai" | Anand–Milind | | Suresh Wadkar |
| Dil Aashna Hai | 252 | "Bhool Ke Din" | Anand–Milind | | Abhijeet, Sudesh Bhonsle, Padmini Kolhapure, Kavita Krishnamurthy, Bhupinder Singh |
| Dil Aashna Hai | 253 | "Dil Aashna Hai"(Sad) | Anand–Milind | | |
| Dil Aashna Hai | 254 | "Ek Dil Ek Jaan" | Anand–Milind | | Kavita Krishnamurthy, Aparna Mayekar |
| Dil Aashna Hai | 255 | "Ek Dil Ek Jaan"(Version ll) | Anand–Milind | | Kavita Krishnamurthy, Aparna Mayekar |
| Dil Ka Kya Kasoor | 256 | "Dil Ka Kya Kasoor"(Female) | Nadeem–Shravan | | |
| Do Hanson Ka Joda | 257 | "Kaise Bitayi Pehli Raat" | Dilip Sen-Sameer Sen | Dilip Tahir | |
| Ek Ladka Ek Ladki | 258 | "Kitna Pyar Tumhein Karte Hain" | Anand–Milind | | Kumar Sanu |
| Ek Ladka Ek Ladki | 259 | "Aao Jhoomein Naachein" | Anand–Milind | | Udit Narayan |
| Ek Ladka Ek Ladki | 260 | "Ande Se Aayi Murgi" | Anand–Milind | | Amit Kumar |
| Ek Ladka Ek Ladki | 261 | "Choti Si Duniya Mohabbat Ki" | Anand–Milind | | Udit Narayan |
| Ganga Bani Shola | 262 | "Hum Banjare Pyar Ke Maare" | Dilip Sen - Sameer Sen | | |
| Ghar Jamai | 263 | "Dil Lagake Dekho" | Anand–Milind | | Mohammed Aziz |
| Ghar Jamai | 264 | "Badli Si Chayi Hai" | Anand–Milind | | Udit Narayan |
| Ghar Jamai | 265 | "Dil Lagate Hain"(Female) | Anand–Milind | | |
| Ghar Jamai | 266 | "Dil Lagate Hain"(Duet) | Anand–Milind | | Suresh Wadkar |
| Ghazab Tamasha | 267 | "Pee Ke Shiv Shankar Ka Pyala" | Anand–Milind | | Kumar Sanu |
| Honeymoon | 268 | "Suniye Janaab" | Anand–Milind | | Abhijeet |
| Honeymoon | 269 | "Shaadi Ki Hai Humko" | Anand–Milind | | Abhijeet |
| Inteha Pyar Ki | 270 | "Tere Liye Duniya" | Anand–Milind | | |
| Inteha Pyar Ki | 271 | "Waadiyon Waadiyon" | Anand–Milind | | |
| Ishq Khuda Hai | 272 | "Apna Dulha Zamane Se Nirala Hai" | Dilip Sen-Sameer Sen | Ravi, Vinod Rathod, Sukhwinder Singh | |
| Jaagruti | 273 | "He Param Pita Parmeshwar" | Anand–Milind | Sameer | |
| Jaan Se Pyaara | 274 | "Bin Tere Kuchh Bhi" | Anand–Milind | | Udit Narayan |
| Jaan Se Pyaara | 275 | "Raj Dulara Too Meri"(Female) | Anand–Milind | | |
| Jaan Se Pyaara | 276 | "Raj Dulara Too Meri"(Sad) | Anand–Milind | | |
| Jaan Se Pyaara | 277 | "Tale Lagale Pehere Bithale" | Anand–Milind | | Amit Kumar |
| Jaan Se Pyaara | 278 | "Bin Tere Kuch Bhi" (Unofficial Version) | Anand–Milind | | Sonu Nigam |
| Jaan Tere Naam | 279 | "Kal College Band Ho" | Nadeem–Shravan | | Udit Narayan |
| Jaan Tere Naam | 280 | "Kal College Band Ho"(Unofficial Version) | Nadeem–Shravan | | Udit Narayan |
| Jigar | 281 | "Pyar Ke Kagaz Pe" | Anand–Milind | Sameer | Abhijeet |
| Jigar | 282 | "Tujhko Bahon Mein Bhar" | Anand–Milind | Sameer | Udit Narayan |
| Jigar | 283 | "Ek Pal Ek Din" | Anand–Milind | Sameer | Pankaj Udhas |
| Jigar | 284 | "Mere Dil Ko Karrar" | Anand–Milind | Sameer | Udit Narayan |
| Jo Jeeta Wohi Sikandar | 285 | "Yahaan Ke Hum" | Jatin–Lalit | Majrooh Sultanpuri | Udit Narayan, Jatin–Lalit |
| Jo Jeeta Wohi Sikandar | 286 | "Humse Hai Sara Jahan" | Jatin–Lalit | Majrooh Sultanpuri | Jatin Pandit |
| Jo Jeeta Wohi Sikandar | 287 | "Pehla Nasha" | Jatin–Lalit | Majrooh Sultanpuri | Udit Narayan |
| Jo Jeeta Wohi Sikandar | 288 | "Shehar Ki Pariyon" | Jatin–Lalit | Majrooh Sultanpuri | Udit Narayan |
| Kal Ki Awaaz | 289 | "Sabse Hum" | Nadeem–Shravan | | |
| Kal Ki Awaaz | 290 | "Aaj Raat Chandni" | Nadeem–Shravan | | |
| Kal Ki Awaaz | 291 | "Aaj Raat Chandni"(Sad) | Nadeem–Shravan | | |
| Kal Ki Awaaz | 292 | "Aaj Raat Chandni"(Version ll) | Nadeem–Shravan | | |
| Kasak | 293 | Barsa Paani Barsa | Rajesh Roshan | Rajesh Roshan | |
| Khel | 294 | "Na Hai Zameen, Na Aasman, Laaye Kahan Ho Humko" | | Rajesh Roshan | Amit Kumar |
| Khule-Aam | 295 | "Tujhko Maine Dil Diya Tujhse Maine Pyar Kiya" | R. D. Burman | | Gautam Roy |
| Lambu Dada | 296 | "Chhod Ke Na Ja" | Rajesh Roshan | | |
| Lambu Dada | 297 | "Chhod Ke"(Sad) | Rajesh Roshan | | |
| Lambu Dada | 298 | "Happy Birthday" | Rajesh Roshan | | |
| Lambu Dada | 299 | "Teri Zindagi Hai" | Rajesh Roshan | | |
| Mere Sajana Saath Nibhana | 300 | "Nakhre Dikha Ke Dil Ko Chur" | Anand–Milind | | Udit Narayan |
| Mere Sajana Saath Nibhana | 301 | "Kangana Kunware Kangana" | Anand–Milind | | Udit Narayan |
| Muskurahat | 302 | "Gun Gun Karta Aaya Bhanwra" | Raamlaxman | | Kumar Sanu |
| Muskurahat | 303 | "Banda Nawaz Izzat Nawaz" | Raamlaxman | | Kumar Sanu |
| My Story | 304 | "Saagar Ke Jaisa" | Kanak Raj | | Kumar Sanu |
| My Story | 305 | "Dar Lagta Hai Mujhko" | Kanak Raj | | Udit Narayan |
| Nagin Aur Lootere | 306 | "Main Hoon Naagin Aur Tum Ho Lootere" | Rajan Mahajan | | |
| Nagin Aur Lootere | 307 | "Sau Sau Janmon Wala" | Rajan Mahajan | | Kumar Sanu |
| Paayal | 308 | "Mohabbat Naa Karana" | Nadeem–Shravan | | Kumar Sanu |
| Paayal | 309 | "Mere Mehboob Meri Jaane Jigar" | Nadeem–Shravan | | Kumar Sanu |
| Paayal | 310 | "Meri Duniya"(Female) | Nadeem–Shravan | | |
| Paayal | 311 | "Tujhko Payal Naam Diya Hai" | Nadeem–Shravan | | |
| Paayal | 312 | "Meri Duniya Me Aana"(Duet) | Nadeem–Shravan | | Kumar Sanu |
| Panaah | 313 | "Kabhi Lage Ke Ye Sara Sach Hai" | Nadeem–Shravan | Vishweshwar Sharma | Kumar Sanu, Udit Narayan |
| Panaah | 314 | "Koi Na Jane Kab Tu Kahan" | Nadeem–Shravan | Vishweshwar Sharma | Udit Narayan, Vicky Mehta, Sarika Kapoor |
| Panaah | 315 | "Teri Panaah Mein Hume Rakhna" | Nadeem–Shravan | Vishweshwar Sharma | Udit Narayan, Vicky Mehta, Sarika Kapoor |
| Panaah | 316 | "Teri Panaah"(Female) | Nadeem–Shravan | Vishweshwar Sharma | |
| Panaah | 317 | "Thoda Matke Se Paani Jara De" | Nadeem–Shravan | Vishweshwar Sharma | Kumar Sanu |
| Parasmani | 318 | "Main Hun Paras Aur" | Anand Lakshman | | |
| Parda Hai Parda | 319 | "Shukriya" | Anand–Milind | | Udit Narayan, Amit Kumar |
| Pitambar | 320 | "Aaja Aaja Na Na" | Suraj Kiran | | Kumar Sanu |
| Pitambar | 321 | "Dil Ne Tujhe Yaad Kiya" | Suraj Kiran | | Kumar Sanu |
| Pitambar | 322 | "Sajna Sajna" | Suraj Kiran | | Kumar Sanu |
| Pitambar | 323 | "Humko Jaana Tumse" | Suraj Kiran | | Kumar Sanu |
| Police Aur Mujrim | 324 | "Apni Aankhon Ke Sitaron Mein" | Bappi Lahiri | | Mohammed Aziz |
| Police Officer | 325 | "Maut Ka Faristha" | Anu Malik | | Shabbir Kumar |
| Police Officer | 326 | "Mujhe Laga Ishq Ka Rog" | Anu Malik | | Abhijeet, Udit Narayan |
| Police Officer | 327 | "Dekho Ye Ladka Current Marta Hai" | Anu Malik | | |
| Prem Deewane | 328 | "Happy Birthday To You Mr. Pedro" | Laxmikant–Pyarelal | | Udit Narayan, Amit Kumar, Jolly Mukherjee |
| Pyar Hua Badnaam | 329 | "Apna Samajh Ke" | Anand–Milind | Sameer | |
| Raju Ban Gaya Gentleman | 330 | "Raju Ban Gaya Gentleman" | Jatin–Lalit | Dev Kohli | Kumar Sanu, Jolly Mukherjee, Sudesh Bhonsle |
| Raju Ban Gaya Gentleman | 331 | "Raju Ban Gaya Gentleman"(Sad) | Jatin–Lalit | Dev Kohli | |
| Ramayana: The Legend of Prince Rama | 332 | "Sita In Panchavati" | Vanraj Bhatia | | |
| Sone Ki Lanka | 333 | "Tere Pyar Ki Bulbul" | Anand–Milind | | Udit Narayan |
| Sone Ki Lanka | 334 | "Aankhon Aankhon Mein" | Anand–Milind | | Abhijeet |
| Sone Ki Zanjeer | 335 | "Mai Tere Radha Tu" | Anand–Milind | | |
| Sone Ki Zanjeer | 336 | "Mai Tere Radha Tu"(Sad) | Anand–Milind | | |
| Sone Ki Zanjeer | 337 | "Mai Tere Radha Tu Mera Shyam" | Anand–Milind | | |
| Tilak | 338 | "Koi Ladka Kisi" | Anand–Milind | | Udit Narayan |
| Vishwatma | 339 | "Aankhon Mein Hai Kya" | Viju Shah | | Mohammed Aziz, Udit Narayan, Alka Yagnik |
| Vishwatma | 340 | "Toofan" | Viju Shah | | Amit Kumar, Alka Yagnik, Sapna Mukherjee & Boney |
| Vishwatma | 341 | "Saat Samundar"(Female) | Viju Shah | | |
| Vishwatma | 342 | "Pardesi Panchi" | Viju Shah | | |
| Vishwatma | 343 | "Dil Le Gaye" | Viju Shah | | Kumar Sanu, Udit Narayan, Mohammed Aziz, Sapna Mukherjee |
| Vishwatma | 344 | "Saat Samundar"(Duet) | Viju Shah | | |
| Yaad Rakhegi Duniya | 345 | "Tujhe Rab Ne Banaya Kis Liye" | Anand–Milind | Sameer | Mohammed Aziz |
| Yudhpath | 346 | "Iss Pe Joban Ki" | Dilip Sen - Sameer Sen | | Ila Arun |

=== 1993 ===
| Film | No | Writer(s) | Song | Composer(s) | Co-artist(s) |
|---|---|---|---|---|---|
| August 15 | 347 | | "Roop Rangili" | Rajan Anand | |
| Aadmi | 348 | P. K. Mishra | "Jaan Se Badhkar" | Jatin–Lalit | Kumar Sanu |
| Aadmi Khilona Hai | 349 | | "Mehndi Lagane Ki Raat" | Nadeem–Shravan | Kumar Sanu |
| Aankhen | 350 | Indeevar | "Angna Mein Baba" | Bappi Lahiri | Kumar Sanu |
| Aashik Awara | 351 | | "Amar Mere Suhaag" | Laxmikant–Pyarelal | |
| Aashik Awara | 352 | | "Chand Aur Piya" | Laxmikant–Pyarelal | |
| Aasoo Bane Angaarey | 353 | | "Teri Rashi Ke Lakhon" | Rajesh Roshan | Debashish Dasgupta |
| Aasoo Bane Angaarey | 354 | | "Tujhe Dekh Ke Khan" | Rajesh Roshan | |
| Anari | 355 | Sameer | "Kya Mausam Aaya Hai" | Anand–Milind | Udit Narayan |
| Anari | 356 | | "Jaane Jaa"(Female) | Anand–Milind | |
| Antim Insaaf | 357 | Brij Bihari | "Matwali Bholi Bhali" | Ilaiyaraaja | Mohammed Aziz |
| Antim Nyay | 358 | Dev Kohli | "Kal Tumse Aakar Kaha Milu" | Raam Laxman | S. P. Balasubrahmanyam |
| Apaatkaal | 359 | | "Mehandi Ni Mahandi" | Rajesh Roshan | |
| Aulad Ke Dushman | 360 | | "Dil Tujhko De Diya" | Shyam - Surendar | Kumar Sanu |
| Aulad Ke Dushman | 361 | | "Main Tera Deewana Hoon" | Shyam - Surendar | Alka Yagnik, Kumar Sanu |
| Aulad Ke Dushman | 362 | | "Maine Tumse Pyar Kiya" | Shyam - Surendar | Kumar Sanu |
| Aulad Ke Dushman | 363 | | "Tum Bhi Ho Bekhabar" | Shyam - Surendar | Kumar Sanu |
| Baarish | 364 | | "Ek Ladki Ho Gayi" | Anand–Milind | |
| Baarish | 365 | | "Pyar Mil Gaya" | Anand–Milind | |
| Baarish | 366 | | "Khabar Kar Do" | Anand–Milind | |
| Baarish | 367 | | "Na Koi Dosh Tera" | Anand–Milind | |
| Baarish | 368 | | "Karo Na Humpe" | Anand–Milind | |
| Baarish | 369 | | "Khuda Ki Den"(Sad) | Anand–Milind | |
| Baarish | 370 | | "Haqiqat Hai" | Anand–Milind | |
| Bechain | 371 | | "Dil Gane"(Female) | Dilip Sen - Sameer Sen | |
| Bechain | 372 | | "Aashiqui Humne" | Dilip Sen - Sameer Sen | |
| Bechain | 373 | | "Ham Se Yu" | Dilip Sen - Sameer Sen | |
| Bechain | 374 | | "Neele Neele" | Dilip Sen - Sameer Sen | |
| Begunaah | 375 | | "Mohaniye Sohniye, Haan Dil Liya, Dil Diya" | Rajesh Roshan | Kumar Sanu |
| Begunaah | 376 | Nida Fazli | "Tere Mere Pyar Ka" (sad) | Rajesh Roshan | Kishore Kumar |
| Bhagyawan | 377 | | "Mummy To Maan Gayi" | Anand–Milind | Udit Narayan |
| Bhagyawan | 378 | | "Ladke Ne Ladki Ko Dekha" | Anand–Milind | |
| Bhookamp | 379 | | "Bheega Bheega Hai Mausam" | Jatin–Lalit | Udit Narayan |
| Bonny | 380 | Majrooh Sultanpuri | "Aaj Toh Ghazab Ka" | Binju Ali | solo |
| Dalaal | 381 | | "Thahre Huye"(Female) | Bappi Lahiri | |
| Damini | 382 | | "Jab Se Tumko" | Nadeem–Shravan | |
| Damini | 383 | | "Bin Sajan Jhoola" | Nadeem–Shravan | |
| Dhanwan | 384 | | "O Sahiba" | Anand–Milind | |
| Dhanwan | 385 | | "Ek Hi Ghosla" | Anand–Milind | |
| Dil Ne Ikraar Kiya | 386 | | "Main Ye Elan Karta Hun" | Anu Malik | |
| Dil Tera Aashiq | 387 | Sameer | "Mujhe Kuchh Kahna" | Nadeem–Shravan | Sudesh Bhonsle |
| Divya Shakti | 388 | | "Sang Sang Chalunga"(Female) | Nadeem–Shravan | |
| Ek Hi Raasta | 389 | Gulshan Bawra | "Meri Seeti Bas Gayee" | Mahesh Kishore | Kumar Sanu |
| Game | 390 | | "Sun Baliye Aayi Rut" | Anand–Milind | Suresh Wadkar |
| Gunaah | 391 | | "Yeh Raat Yeh Tanhaiyan" | Rajesh Roshan | Amit Kumar |
| Gunaah | 392 | | "Ek Musafir Hoon Main" | Rajesh Roshan | Manhar Udhas |
| Hasti | 393 | | "Mat Pooch Mere Mehboob" | Anand–Milind | Kumar Sanu, Mukul Agarwal |
| Hasti | 394 | | "Ladka Ladki Se Phansa" | Anand–Milind | Amit Kumar |
| Hasti | 395 | | "Main Pyasi Nadiya Hoon" | Anand–Milind | Suresh Wadkar |
| Hum Anaaree Hain | 396 | Sameer | "Phir Aashiqui Ki Hadh Se" | Anand–Milind | Kumar Sanu |
| Hum Hain Rahi Pyar Ke | 397 | Sameer | "Woh Meri Neend Mera Chain Mujhe" | Nadeem–Shravan | |
| Insaniyat Ke Devta | 398 | | "Suno To Zara" | Anand–Milind | Kumar Sanu |
| Insaniyat Ke Devta | 399 | | "Neend Nahi Aati" | Anand–Milind | Udit Narayan |
| Ishq Aur Inteqaam | 400 | | "Aaj Meri Jaan Ke" | Bhupi Ratan | |
| Jeena Nahin Bin Tere | 401 | Indeevar | "Dil Dil Dil" | Rajesh Roshan | Udit Narayan |
| Jeena Nahin Bin Tere | 402 | Indeevar | "Udte Phiren Hum Tum" | Rajesh Roshan | Udit Narayan |
| Jeena Nahin Bin Tere | 403 | Indeevar | "Sadke Tere Pyaar Ke" | Rajesh Roshan | Mangal Singh |
| Jeena Nahin Bin Tere | 404 | Indeevar | "Sukh Dukh Baat Jayenge" | Rajesh Roshan | Manhar Udhas |
| Jeena Nahin Bin Tere | 405 | Indeevar | "Sukh Dukh Baat Jayenge" (version 2) | Rajesh Roshan | Manhar Udhas |
| Jeevan Ki Shatranj | 406 | | "Aa Gale Lag Jaa" | Anand–Milind | |
| Jeevan Ki Shatranj | 407 | | "Seene Se"(Duet) | Anand–Milind | Suresh Wadkar |
| Jeevan Ki Shatranj | 408 | | "Seene Se"(Solo) | Anand–Milind | |
| Kayda Kanoon | 409 | | "Aankhon Mein Nahin Dil Mein" | Anand–Milind | Kumar Sanu |
| Kayda Kanoon | 410 | | "Aap Aaye" | Anand–Milind | Kumar Sanu |
| Kayda Kanoon | 411 | | "Parvaton Pe Chhaayee Ghataayen" | Anand–Milind | Suresh Wadkar |
| Khal-Naaikaa | 412 | | "Kisi Ki Premika Banke" | Mahesh Kishore | Kavita Krishnamurthy |
| Khal-Naaikaa | 413 | | "Dost Bewafaa Hai" | Mahesh Kishore | |
| Khal-Naaikaa | 414 | | "Mere Achchhe Chandamama" | Mahesh Kishore | |
| Khal-Naaikaa | 415 | | "Doosron Ki Burai" | Mahesh Kishore | Vipin Sachdeva |
| Khoon Ka Sindoor | 416 | | "Chhoti Si Hai" | Dilip Sen - Sameer Sen | |
| Khoon Ka Sindoor | 417 | | "Premi Hua Aashiq" | Dilip Sen - Sameer Sen | |
| King Uncle | 418 | Indeevar | "Hum Rahe Na Rahe Yahaan Par" | Rajesh Roshan | |
| King Uncle | 419 | Indeevar | "Khush Rahne Ko" | Rajesh Roshan | Vinod Rathod, Nitin Mukesh, Alka Yagnik |
| King Uncle | 420 | Indeevar | "Taare Aasman Ke Dharti Pe" | Rajesh Roshan | |
| Kohra | 421 | | "O Bewafa" | Nadeem–Shravan | |
| Kohra | 422 | | "Tujhe Meri Kasam" | Nadeem–Shravan | |
| Kohra | 423 | | "Chhodo Gussa" | Nadeem–Shravan | |
| Kshatriya | 424 | | "Chham Chham Barse" | Laxmikant–Pyarelal | Kavita Krishnamurthy |
| Kundan | 425 | | "Sharma Gayee" | Bappi Lahiri | |
| Kundan | 426 | | "Meri Tujhse Hai" | Bappi Lahiri | |
| Meri Aan | 427 | | "Sanju Hai Naam Mera" | Ravindra Jain | Mohammed Aziz |
| Meri Aan | 428 | | "Woh Wada Hi Kya Jo Nibhaya Na Jaaye" | Ravindra Jain | Kumar Sanu |
| Parwane | 429 | | "Ab Aaye Hai" | Anand–Milind | Amit Kumar, Udit Narayan |
| Pehla Nasha | 430 | | "Tum Kiss Liye Ho Bekarar" | Neeraj Vohra | |
| Phir Teri Kahani Yaad Aayee | 431 | | "Tere Dar Par Sanam"(Female) | Anu Malik | |
| Phool | 432 | Anand Bakshi | "Sajna O Sajna" | Anand–Milind | |
| Phool | 433 | Anand Bakshi | "Kitna Pyar Karta Hoon" | Anand–Milind | Kumar Sanu |
| Phool Aur Angaar | 434 | Rani Malik | "Hum Teri Mohabbat Mein" | Anu Malik | Kumar Sanu |
| Phoolan Hasina Ramkali | 435 | | "Phoolon Hasina"(Title Song) | Dilip Sen - Sameer Sen | Alka Yagnik, Kavita Krishnamurthy |
| Platform | 436 | | "Na Pyar Kiye Na Ikraar Kiye" | Anand–Milind | Udit Narayan |
| Platform | 437 | | "Ek Din Jhagda Ek Din Pyar" | Anand–Milind | Kumar Sanu |
| Prateeksha | 438 | | "Aao Duniya Ke Paar Chalein" | Rajesh Roshan | Mohammad Aziz |
| Pyar Pyar | 439 | | "Dagi Dum Dum" | Nadeem–Shravan | Nitin Mukesh |
| Rani Aur Maharani | 440 | | "O Mitwa Aaja Re" | Jitu Tapan | |
| Sainik | 441 | | "Kitni Hasrat Hai Hamein" | Nadeem–Shravan | Kumar Sanu |
| Santaan | 442 | | "Suno To Meri Aasha" | Anand–Milind | Abhijeet |
| Shaktiman | 443 | | "Jee Na Lage Bin" | Channi Singh | Udit Narayan |
| Shatranj | 444 | | "Dil Pe Tere Pyar" | Anand–Milind | Kumar Sanu |
| Shatranj | 445 | | "Ae Sanam Itna Bata" | Anand–Milind | S. P. Balasubrahmanyam |
| Shreemaan Aashique | 446 | | "Aasman Tak Jaa Pahuchegi" | Nadeem–Shravan | Kumar Sanu |
| Tadipaar | 447 | Sameer | "Pyaar Ka Pahla Saal Hai" | Nadeem–Shravan | Kumar Sanu |
| Tahqiqaat | 448 | Gulshan Bawra | "Na Tum Intni Haseen" | Anu Malik | Vinod Rathod |
| Teri Payal Mere Geet | 449 | | "Kaali Durge Namo Namah" | Naushad | Ravindra Sathe |
| Tirangaa | 450 | | "Ise Samjho Na Resham Ka Taar" | Laxmikant–Pyarelal | |
| Tirangaa | 451 | | "Ise Samjho Na Resham Ka Taar"(Tragic) | Laxmikant–Pyarelal | |
| Tirangaa | 452 | | "Jaane Mann Jaane Mann" | Laxmikant–Pyarelal | Mohammed Aziz |

=== 1994 ===
| Film | No | Song | Composer(s) | Writer(s) | Co-artist(s) |
|---|---|---|---|---|---|
| Aa Gale Lag Jaa | 453 | "Hum Na Honge" | Anu Malik | | |
| Aa Gale Lag Jaa | 454 | "Tere Baghair" | Anu Malik | | |
| Aag Aur Chingari | 455 | "Hungama" | Bappi Lahiri | | |
| Aao Pyaar Karen | 456 | "Jab Do Dil Milte" | Aadesh Shrivastava | | |
| Aashiq | 457 | "Aashiq Na The Hum" | Aadesh Shrivastava | Dev Kohli | Shabbir Kumar |
| Aatish: Feel the Fire | 458 | "Hasratein Hain Bahut" | Nadeem–Shravan | | |
| Andaz | 459 | "Kadha Hai" | Bappi Lahiri | | |
| Andaz Apna Apna | 460 | "Jaana Tune" | Tushar Bhatia | | |
| Andhera | 461 | "Le Lo Meri Aankhon" | Dilip Dutta | | |
| Andhera | 462 | "Meri Zindagi Tu" | Dilip Dutta | | Mohd Aziz |
| Anjaam | 463 | "Kolhapur Se Aaye" | Anand–Milind | | |
| Anth | 464 | "Na Vaada Karte Hain" | Anand–Milind | | |
| Anth | 465 | "Tu Deewani" | Anand–Milind | | |
| Betaaj Badshah | 466 | "Kabhi Mushkil" | Anand–Milind | | |
| Betaaj Badshah | 467 | "Pyar Aankhon" | Anand–Milind | | |
| Chauraha | 468 | "Mujhe Aapni Bahon" | Laxmikant–Pyarelal | | |
| Chhoti Bahoo | 469 | "Sooraj Ki Pehli Kiran" | Nadeem–Shravan | | |
| Dulaara | 470 | "Dil Mein Duaen" | Nikhil–Vinay | | |
| Elaan | 471 | "Mil Ke Tumhari" | Shyam - Surendar | | |
| Elaan | 472 | "Subah Hui Sham" | Shyam - Surendar | | |
| Elaan | 473 | "Pehle Mere" | Shyam - Surendar | | |
| Fauj | 474 | "Dil Pe Likh De" | Raamlaxman | | |
| Fauj | 475 | "Sare Zamane Se" | Raamlaxman | | |
| Gangapur Ki Geeta | 476 | "Suhane Saawan Ki" | Jeetu-Tapan | | Udit Narayan |
| Gangster | 477 | "Baahon Mein" | Jatin–Lalit | | |
| Gangster | 478 | "Lachak Lachak" | Jatin–Lalit | | |
| Hanste Khelte | 479 | "Diwana Dil Kahe" | Jatin–Lalit | | |
| Hum Hain Bemisaal | 480 | "Tujhse Kya Chori" | Anu Malik | | |
| Insaniyat | 481 | "Haule"(Version l) | Rajesh Roshan | | |
| Insaniyat | 482 | "Haule"(Version ll) | Rajesh Roshan | | |
| Insaniyat | 483 | "Saathi Tera Pyar"(Duet) | Rajesh Roshan | | |
| Insaniyat | 484 | "Saathi Tera Pyar"(Female) | Rajesh Roshan | | |
| Ishq Mein Jeena Ishq Mein Marna | 485 | "Are Baba Yeh Dil" | Shyam - Surendar | | |
| Ishq Mein Jeena Ishq Mein Marna | 486 | "Kisi Se Mujhe" | Shyam - Surendar | | |
| Ishq Mein Jeena Ishq Mein Marna | 487 | "Ruk Ja Mere" | Shyam - Surendar | | |
| Janta Ki Adalat | 488 | "Dil Dhadakne" | Bappi Lahiri | | |
| Juaari | 489 | "Chhupaa Le" | Bappi Lahiri | | |
| Juaari | 490 | "Tum Hi Tum Ho" | Bappi Lahiri | | |
| Karan | 491 | "Aasmaan Pe" | Raamlaxman | | |
| Karan | 492 | "Mera Dil Tera" | Raamlaxman | | |
| Kranti Kshetra | 493 | "Tumhara Naam Kya" | Nadeem–Shravan | | |
| Krantiveer | 494 | "Phool Kali Chand" | Anand–Milind | | |
| Laqshya | 495 | "Bekhudi Ke Nashe" | Jatin–Lalit | | |
| Madhosh | 496 | "Dushamani" | Anand–Milind | | |
| Madhosh | 497 | "Mere Sanam" | Anand–Milind | | |
| Madhosh | 498 | "Bewafa Sangdil" | Anand–Milind | | |
| Mahakaal | 499 | "Chal Chal Meri Jaan" | Anand–Milind | | Udit Narayan, Sudesh Bhosle |
| Maha Shaktishaali | 500 | "Chori Chori Lag Gayee" | Anand–Milind | | |
| Maha Shaktishaali | 501 | "Kamli Han Tere" | Anand–Milind | | |
| Maha Shaktishaali | 502 | "Mohabbat Mein Itne" | Anand–Milind | | |
| Maine Dil Liya | 503 | "Kuhu Kuhu Gaati Koyaliya" | M. M. Keeravani | Anita Sen, Wafai Meruthi | solo |
| Maine Dil Liya | 504 | "Mausam Pyaar Ka" | M. M. Keeravani | Anita Sen, Wafai Meruthi | Kumar Sanu |
| Mera Pyara Bharat | 505 | "Jaane Jahan Mere" | Ilaiyaraaja | P K Mishra | Vinod Rathod |
| Mera Pyara Bharat | 506 | "Kali Raat Sanam" | Ilaiyaraaja | P K Mishra | Vinod Rathod |
| Mohra | 507 | "Na Kajre Ki"(Duet) | Viju Shah | | |
| Mohra | 508 | "Na Kajre Ki"(Female) | Viju Shah | | |
| Mohra | 509 | "Subah Se Lekar" | Viju Shah | | |
| Mr Shrimati | 510 | "Aaj Yeh Kya Hua" | Babla | Anjaan | Suresh Wadkar |
| Prem Shakti | 511 | "Aa Baith Mere Godh" | Raamlaxman | | |
| Prem Yog | 512 | "Jane Kya Hua" | Bappi Lahiri | | |
| Sajna Doli Leke Aana | 513 | "Mere Mitwa Mere O Sajana" | M. M. Kreem | | |
| Sajna Doli Leke Aana | 514 | "Mere Mitwa Mere O Sajana"(Sad) | M. M. Kreem | | |
| Saajan Ka Ghar | 515 | "Dard Sahenge" | Nadeem–Shravan | | |
| Saajan Ka Ghar | 516 | "Sawan Aaya" | Nadeem–Shravan | | |
| Saboot Mangta Hai Kanoon | 517 | "Batao Ae Duniya" | Kalyanji–Anandji | | |
| Saboot Mangta Hai Kanoon | 518 | "Bhool Jaa"(Female) | Kalyanji–Anandji | | |
| Saboot Mangta Hai Kanoon | 519 | "Ye Qurbaan" | Kalyanji–Anandji | | |
| Sangam Ho Ke Rahega | 520 | "Pi Pi Janam Pi" | Anand–Milind | Saawan Kumar Tak | Amit Kumar |
| Sangdil Sanam | 521 | "Aankhon Mein Band" | Anand–Milind | Sameer | Amit Kumar |
| Suhaag | 523 | "Taa Na Na" | Anand–Milind | | Udit Narayan |
| Teesra Kaun | 524 | "Humein Tumse Pyar" | | | |
| The Gentleman | 525 | "Hum Apne Gham Ko" | Anu Malik | | |
| The Gentleman | 526 | "Aashiqi Mein Had" | Anu Malik | | |
| Udhaar Ki Zindagi | 527 | "Main Bhi Chup" | Anand–Milind | | |
| Udhaar Ki Zindagi | 528 | "Thodi Hansi"(Version ll) | Anand–Milind | | |
| Vijaypath | 529 | "Aayiye Aapka" | Anu Malik | | |
| Vijaypath | 530 | "Seene Mein" | Anu Malik | | |
| Zakhmi Dil | 531 | "Mujhko Bhi" | Rishi Raj | | |
| Zakhmi Dil | 532 | "Ae Meri Zindagi" | Rishi Raj | | |
| Zakhmi Dil | 533 | "Phool Jahan" | Rishi Raj | | |
| Zamane Se Kya Darna | 534 | "Aaja Re Aaja Re" | Anand–Milind | | |
| Zamane Se Kya Darna | 535 | "Maine Tujhe" | Anand–Milind | | |

=== 1995 ===
| Film | No | Song | Composer(s) | Writer(s) | Co-artist(s) |
|---|---|---|---|---|---|
| Aaj Ka Romeo | 536 | "Suno Mere Balam" | Deva | | |
| Aatank Hi Aatank | 537 | "Tere Siva Kaun Hai Mera" | Bappi Lahiri | | |
| Ab Insaf Hoga | 538 | "Mere Jhumkon Ne" | Anand–Milind | | |
| Ab Insaf Hoga | 539 | "No Problem" | Anand–Milind | | |
| Ab To Jeene Do | 540 | "Dharti Gagan" | Dilip Sen - Sameer Sen | | |
| Ab To Jeene Do | 541 | "Main Jawan Tu Jawan" | Dilip Sen - Sameer Sen | | |
| Adhuri Dulhan | 542 | "Kaagaz Ki Kashti Mein" | | | Nitin Mukesh |
| Ahankaar | 543 | "Oh Bamba Oh" | Anu Malik | | |
| Ahankaar | 544 | "Mummy Ne Poocha" | Anu Malik | | |
| Ahankaar | 545 | "Pyar Iska Naam Hai" | Anu Malik | | |
| Baazi | 546 | "Dheere Dheere Aap Mere" | Anu Malik | | |
| Baazi | 547 | "Jaane Mujhe" | Anu Malik | | |
| Baazi | 548 | "Na Jaane Kya" | Anu Malik | | |
| Baazi | 549 | "Maine Kaha" | Anu Malik | | |
| Bank Robbery | 550 | "Bas Ek Tumko Sanam" | Mahesh Kishore | | Kumar Sanu |
| Bank Robbery | 551 | "Bas Ek Tumko Sanam" (Sad) | Mahesh Kishore | | Kumar Sanu |
| Barsaat | 552 | "Nahin Yeh Ho" | Nadeem–Shravan | | |
| Bedardi Sanam | 553 | "Khoye Khoye Rehte Ho" | Jolly Mukherjee | | solo |
| Cinema Cinema | 554 | "Garaj Garaj Aaye Kaale Badra" | Kalyanji-Anandji | Javed Akhtar | solo |
| Cinema Cinema | 555 | "Tribute To Legendary Music Composers" | Anu Malik | | Alka Yagnik |
| Chhaila | 556 | "Tere Pyar Ki Hai" | Ilaiyaraaja | | Vinod Rathod |
| Chhaila | 557 | "Chahunga Main" | Ilaiyaraaja | | Vinod Rathod |
| Coolie No. 1 | 558 | "Kya Majnu Kya Ranjha" | Anand–Milind | | |
| Faraar | 559 | "Dheere Dheere" | Anand–Milind | | |
| Faraar | 560 | "Aaja Aaja" | Anand–Milind | | |
| Gaddaar | 561 | "Beta Apni Maa Se"(Female) | Nadeem–Shravan | | |
| Gaddaar | 562 | "Mohabbat Woh Karega" | Nadeem–Shravan | | |
| Gambler | 563 | "Gambler Gambler" | Anu Malik | M G Hashmat | Vinod Rathod |
| Gambler | 564 | "Sajde Na Kiye Maine" | Anu Malik | M G Hashmat | Vinod Rathod |
| Gambler | 565 | "Hum Unse Mohabbat Karke" | Anu Malik | M G Hashmat | Kumar Sanu |
| Ghar Ka Kanoon | 566 | "Mere Dil Me" | Sapan - Jagmohan | | |
| God and Gun | 567 | "Sab Kehene Lage" | Anand–Milind | | |
| God and Gun | 568 | "Aaya Tha Dhoondhe" | Anand–Milind | | |
| God and Gun | 569 | "Tu Meri Ibtada Hai" | Anand–Milind | | |
| Guddu | 570 | "Dil Hai Pyare" | Naushad | | |
| Gundaraj | 571 | "Mujhe Tum Se" | Anu Malik | | |
| Gundaraj | 572 | "Dhadke Dhadke Mera" | Anu Malik | | |
| Gunehgar | 573 | "Kasam Se Sari Raat" | Shyam - Surendar | | |
| Gunehgar | 574 | "Keh Do Na Ki" | Shyam - Surendar | | |
| Hulchul | 575 | "Main Laila Ki" | Anu Malik | | |
| Hulchul | 576 | "Bando Pe Apne Ae Daata" | Anu Malik | | |
| Hum Dono | 577 | "Ek Ladki Hai Deewani Si" | Anand–Milind | | |
| Hum Dono | 578 | "Meri Wafa Meri Dua" | Anand–Milind | | |
| Ham Sab Chor Hain | 579 | "Tere Mere Pyar Ka" | Bappi Lahiri | | |
| Jai Vikraanta | 580 | "Tere Honto Pe" | Anand–Milind | | |
| Jai Vikraanta | 581 | "Ristha Tera"(Female) | Anand–Milind | | |
| Jallaad | 582 | "Chinai Chun" | Anand–Milind | | |
| Jallaad | 583 | "Tumhein Hum" | Anand–Milind | | |
| Janam Kundli | 584 | "Love Love Love" | Anand–Milind | | |
| Jawab | 585 | "Kal Hum Jahan Mile" | Anu Malik | | |
| Jawab | 586 | "Tum Pe Dil Aa Gaya" | Anu Malik | | |
| Jawab | 587 | "Ye Dil Mein"(Female) | Anu Malik | | |
| Kalyug Ke Avtaar | 588 | "I Love You" | Ravindra Jain | Ravindra Jain | Vinod Rathod |
| Karan Arjun | 589 | "Bhangra Paale" | Rajesh Roshan | | |
| Kartavya | 590 | "Ek Baar Mujhe" | Dilip Sen - Sameer Sen | | |
| Kartavya | 591 | "Paradesiyo Se"(Duet) | Dilip Sen - Sameer Sen | | |
| Kismat | 592 | "Kuch Kuch Hota Hai" | Anand–Milind | | |
| Kismat | 593 | "Hum Hain Deewane" | Anand–Milind | | |
| Maidan-E-Jung | 594 | "Shaam Dhal" | Bappi Lahiri | | |
| Maidan-E-Jung | 595 | "Lo Paghun Ritu" | Bappi Lahiri | | |
| Masoom Gawah | 596 | "Chiki Chiki Tang Tang" (sad) | Kalyanji-Anandji | Shail Chaturvedi, Maya Govind and Hasrat Jaipuri | Suresh Wadkar |
| Masoom Gawah | 597 | "Chiki Chiki Tang Tang" (version 1) | Kalyanji-Anandji | Shail Chaturvedi, Maya Govind and Hasrat Jaipuri | Kumar Sanu, Suresh Wadkar, Sonali Vajpaee |
| Masoom Gawah | 598 | "Chiki Chiki Tang Tang" (version 2) | Kalyanji-Anandji | Shail Chaturvedi, Maya Govind and Hasrat Jaipuri | Suresh Wadkar |
| Masoom Gawah | 599 | "Hey Trishul Dhari" | Kalyanji-Anandji | Shail Chaturvedi, Maya Govind and Hasrat Jaipuri | Suresh Wadkar, Sonali Vajpaee |
| Masoom Gawah | 600 | "Naache Mor Mayuri" | Kalyanji-Anandji | Shail Chaturvedi, Maya Govind and Hasrat Jaipuri | Suresh Wadkar |
| Meri Mohabbat Mera Naseeba | 601 | "Main Bewafa Nahin Hoon" | Anand–Milind | | |
| Meri Mohabbat Mera Naseeba | 602 | "Saj Dhaj Ke Thi Chhat Pe" | Anand–Milind | | |
| Milan | 603 | "Aansu Judai Ke" | Anand–Milind | | |
| Milan | 604 | "Ek Baat Bataon" | Anand–Milind | | |
| Nazar Ke Samne | 605 | "Dil Dhadke Kuchh" | Mahesh - Kishore | | |
| Nazar Ke Samne | 606 | "Dheere Dheere" | Mahesh - Kishore | | |
| Nishana | 607 | "Hamensha Muskurate" | Jatin–Lalit | | |
| Paandav | 608 | "Ye Haina Pyar Ki Tumse" | Jatin–Lalit | | |
| Param Vir Chakra | 609 | "Sun Aaj Mere" | Ravindra Jain | | |
| Raghuveer | 610 | "Mera Yaar Sangdil" | Dilip Sen - Sameer Sen | | |
| Raghuveer | 611 | "Mujhe Ishq Da" | Dilip Sen - Sameer Sen | | |
| Ram Jaane | 612 | "Chori Chori O Gori" | Anu Malik | | |
| Ram Jaane | 613 | "Bum Chiki Chiki Bum" | Anu Malik | | |
| Ravan Raaj: A True Story | 614 | "O Sanam O Sanam" | Viju Shah | | |
| Reshma | 615 | "Mehboob Mehboob" | Dilip Sen-Sameer Sen | Mahender Dalvi | Mangal Singh |
| Reshma | 616 | "Tak Dhin Ta" | Dilip Sen-Sameer Sen | Mahender Dalvi | Kumar Sanu |
| Saajan Ki Baahon Mein | 617 | "Aap Ke Karieb" | Nadeem–Shravan | | |
| Saajan Ki Baahon Mein | 618 | "Saachi Kaho" | Nadeem–Shravan | | |
| Sabse Bada Khiladi | 619 | "Tu Hain Aandhi" | Rajesh Roshan | | |
| Sarhad: The Border of Crime | 620 | "Suno Yaar"(Duet) | Sukhwinder Singh | | |
| Taaqat | 621 | "Dandiye Ke Bahane" | Anand–Milind | | |
| Taaqat | 622 | "Patthar Pe Likhi" | Anand–Milind | | |
| Taqdeerwala | 623 | "Char Bhaje Bagon" | Anand–Milind | | |
| Taqdeerwala | 624 | "Phool Jaisi Muskaan" | Anand–Milind | | |
| Taqdeerwala | 625 | "Suswagatham Abhinandanam" | Anand–Milind | | |
| Teen Moti | 626 | "Dil Tera Diwana Hai" | Dilip Sen - Sameer Sen | | |
| Teen Moti | 627 | "Tumko Janam Jane" | Dilip Sen - Sameer Sen | | |
| The Don | 628 | "Teri Chaahat Mein Dil" | Dilip Sen - Sameer Sen | | |
| The Don | 629 | "Dil Ko Jo Maanu To" | Dilip Sen - Sameer Sen | | |
| Vapsi Sajan Ki | 630 | "Tumsa Koi Nahi" | Anand–Milind | | Suresh Wadkar |
| Veergati | 631 | "Meri Nigah Mein" | Aadesh Shrivastava | | |
| Veergati | 632 | "Tum Dil Main" | Aadesh Shrivastava | | |
| Velu Naayakan | 51 | "Mastiyo Mein Dooba" | Ilaiyaraaja | P K Mishra, Nawab Arzoo | Udit Narayan |
| Zakhmi Sipahi | 633 | "Tum Sharma Ke" | Rais Bhartiya | | |
| Zakhmi Sipahi | 634 | "Hothon Se Chahat Ka" | Rais Bhartiya | | |
| Zulm Ka Jawab | 635 | "Rasmein Wafa Hum" | Bappi Lahiri | Indeevar | Mohammed Aziz |

=== 1996 ===
| Film | No | Song | Composer(s) | Writer(s) | Co-artist(s) |
|---|---|---|---|---|---|
| Abhiyog | 635 | "Main Ne To Tum" | Agush | | |
| Abhiyog | 636 | "O Piya" | Agush | | |
| Angaara | 637 | "Gore Gore Gal Wali" | Dilip Sen - Sameer Sen | | Udit Narayan |
| Apne Dam Par | 638 | "Mujhe Is Tarah Se" | Aadesh Shrivastava | | Udit Narayan |
| Army | 639 | "Dil Mein Kuch Hone Laga" | Anand–Milind | | Kumar Sanu |
| Army | 640 | "De Taali" | Anand–Milind | | Vinod Rathod, Abhijeet, Jolly Mukherjee |
| Army | 641 | "Achiko Bachiko" | Anand–Milind | | Udit Narayan, Aditya Narayan |
| Bal Bramhachari | 642 | "Tu Hain Ladki" | Bappi Lahiri | | |
| Bambai Ka Babu | 643 | "Sapne Hai Yaadein Hai" | Anand–Milind | | Kumar Sanu |
| Chaahat | 644 | "Kabhi Dil Se Kam" | Anu Malik | Nida Fazli | Kumar Sanu |
| Chhota Sa Ghar | 645 | "Tu Jhuth Bolta Hai" | Rajesh Roshan | | Kumar Sanu |
| Chhota Sa Ghar | 646 | "Sorry Sorry Galti" | Rajesh Roshan | | Kumar Sanu |
| Chhota Sa Ghar | 647 | "Allah Jane" | Rajesh Roshan | | Kumar Sanu |
| Daanveer | 648 | "Meri Jaan Tera Dil" | Anand–Milind | | |
| Daanveer | 649 | "Jab Dil Tarse" | Anand–Milind | | |
| Daraar | 650 | "Deewana Deewana" | Anu Malik | Rahat Indori | Abhijeet |
| Durjan | 651 | "Khafa Nahin" | Sapan Jagmohan | | |
| Dushmani: A Violent Love Story | 652 | "Tere Bina Jiya Kahin" | Anand–Milind | Sameer | Udit Narayan |
| Ek Anari Do Khiladi | 653 | "Aaya Aaya Sawan" | Raj–Koti | | |
| Ek Anari Do Khiladi | 654 | "Tak Dhina Dhin" | Raj–Koti | | |
| Ek Anari Do Khiladi | 655 | "Yeh Dil To Gaata Hai" | Raj–Koti | | |
| Ek Tha Raja | 656 | "Hum Hai Kahan" | Anand–Milind | Sameer | Abhijeet |
| Ek Tha Raja | 657 | "Halka Halka Chhaya" | Anand–Milind | Sameer | Kumar Sanu |
| Gayak | 658 | "Aaja Basale" | Anu Malik | | |
| Gayak | 659 | "Is Pyar Ne Mujhko" | Anu Malik | | |
| Ghatak: Lethal | 660 | "Nigahon Ne Chheda" | R. D. Burman | Majrooh Sultanpuri | Suresh Wadkar |
| Ghatak: Lethal | 661 | "Ek Dil Ki Diwani" | R. D. Burman | Majrooh Sultanpuri | Suresh Wadkar |
| Hasina Aur Nagina | 662 | "Mai Tera Raja Tu Meri" | Dilip Sen - Sameer Sen | | Nitin Mukesh |
| Hasina Aur Nagina | 663 | "Meri Shishe Wali" | Dilip Sen - Sameer Sen | | |
| Himmatvar | 664 | "Kitni Chaahat" | Nadeem–Shravan | | Sameer |
| Hindustani | 665 | "Kasthiyaan Bhi" | A. R. Rahman | | S. P. Balasubrahmanyam |
| Jaan | 666 | "Hum Aise Karenge Pyar" | Anand–Milind | | Udit Narayan |
| Jagannath | 667 | "Dil Ki Kalam Se" | Arpita Raj | Anand Bakshi | Kumar Sanu |
| Jeet | 668 | "Waadon Se Nahin" | Nadeem–Shravan | | Kumar Sanu |
| Jurmana | 669 | "Tere Pyar Mein Dil Ye" | Dilip Sen - Sameer Sen | | Udit Narayan |
| Khiladiyon Ka Khiladi | 670 | "Tu Kaun Hai Tera" | Anu Malik | | Kumar Sanu |
| Khiladiyon Ka Khiladi | 671 | "Tu Waaqif Nahi" | Anu Malik | | Kumar Sanu |
| Khoon Ki Pyaasi | 672 | "Deewana Dil Kyon Kho Gaya" (duet) | Anu Malik | Vijay Patalvi | Vinod Rathod |
| Kisi Se Dil Lagake Dekho | 673 | "O Rama O" | Rajesh Roshan | Sameer | Pankaj Udhaas |
| Krishna | 674 | "Koi Kaise Mohabbat" | Anu Malik | Anwar Sagar | Kumar Sanu |
| Maa Ki Shakti | 675 | "Durga Humari Hai Maa" (version 2) | Chakravarthy | P. K. Mishra, Indeevar | Vinod Rathod |
| Madari | 676 | "Adhoore Hain Mere"(Female) | Kalyanji–Anandji | | |
| Madari | 677 | "Hawa Hoon" | Kalyanji–Anandji | | |
| Madari | 678 | "Tu Suraj Hai Main Teri" | Kalyanji–Anandji | | |
| Madari | 679 | "Ud Jare Mhara Kaala" | Kalyanji–Anandji | | |
| Masoom | 680 | "Zindagi Ko Jina Hai To" | Anand Raaj Anand | | Jolly Mukherjee, Anand Raj Anand, Arun Bakshi |
| Masoom | 681 | "Yeh Jo Teri Payalonki Chan Chan Hai" | Anand Raaj Anand | | Abhijeet |
| Mr. Bechara | 682 | "Sadiyon Se Hum Tumhare" | Anand–Milind | | |
| Muqadama | 683 | "Chota Sa Ek Ghar" | Bappi Lahiri | | |
| Muqadar | 684 | "Tataiya Bole Tu Tu Tu" | Anand–Milind | | Vinod Rathod |
| Naam Kya Hai | 685 | "Laga Nazariya Ka Dhakka" | Anand–Milind | Majrooh Sultanpuri | Vinod Rathod |
| Naam Kya Hai | 686 | "Tere Hothon Pe" | Anand–Milind | Majrooh Sultanpuri | Sachin Pilgaonkar |
| Namak | 687 | "Kismat Roothi Duniya Chhooti" | Anu Malik | | Nitin Mukesh |
| Namak | 688 | "Chanda Bhi Nazar Aayega" | Anu Malik | Hasrat Jaipuri | Nitin Mukesh, Shabbir Kumar |
| Nazarr | 689 | "Dekho Mere Humsafar" | Dilip Sen-Sameer Sen | Maya Govind, Nawab Arzoo | Udit Narayan |
| Nirbhay | 690 | "O Babu Zara Dil De" | Raamlaxman | | Udit Narayan |
| Nirbhay | 691 | "Tujhe Dekh Ke" | Raamlaxman | | Vinod Rathod |
| Nirbhay | 692 | "Channa Mere Channa" | Raamlaxman | | Suresh Wadkar |
| Nirbhay | 693 | "Maa Kya Karegi" | Raamlaxman | | Suresh Wadkar, Vinod Rathod, Simi Mishra |
| Ram Aur Shyam | 694 | "Sajna Tere Bina" | Anu Malik | | Poornima |
| Rangbaaz | 695 | "Aankhon Hi" | Bappi Lahiri | | Abhijeet |
| Sapoot | 696 | "Kajal Kajal" | Anu Malik | Dev Kohli | Kumar Sanu |
| Shohrat | 697 | "Aaj Kal Lagta" | Nikhil–Vinay | | |
| Shohrat | 698 | "Halaat Hain" | Nikhil–Vinay | | |
| Shohrat | 699 | "Pyar Ke Hum" | Nikhil–Vinay | | |
| Spot Boy | 700 | "Jab Paas Ho Tum" | Iqbal Qureshi | | |
| Tasveer Mere Sanam Ki | 701 | "Aao Ki Chandni Ki Barsaat | Alankar | Naqsh Lyallpuri | Sonu Nigam |
| Tasveer Mere Sanam Ki | 702 | "Dhaani Chunariya" | Alankar | Naqsh Lyallpuri | |
| Tasveer Mere Sanam Ki | 703 | "Gungunane Laga Hai Bahaar" | Alankar | Naqsh Lyallpuri | |
| Tere Mere Sapne | 704 | "Kuch Mere Dilne Kaha" | Viju Shah | | Hariharan |
| Tere Mere Sapne | 705 | "Mere Piya" | Viju Shah | | Udit Narayan |
| Vachan | 706 | "Tujhe Dekha To" | Sukhwinder Singh | | Vinod Rathod |
| Yash | 707 | "Neenden Churaye Jo" | Tabun Suthradar | | Udit Narayan |
| Zordaar | 708 | "Ganpati Bappa" | Anu Malik | | Anu Malik |
| Zordaar | 709 | "Ae Babu Ae Babu" | Anu Malik | | |
| Zordaar | 710 | "Russi Na Amriki" | Anu Malik | | Anu Malik, Krish Malik |

=== 1997 ===
| Film | No | Song | Composer(s) | Writer(s) | Co-artist(s) |
|---|---|---|---|---|---|
| Aar Ya Paar | 711 | "Mann Chahe Sanam" | Viju Shah | | |
| Aastha: In the Prison of Spring | 712 | "Tum Tanana Tere Na" | Shaarang Dev | | |
| Bhai | 713 | "Sare Mohalle Mein" | Anand–Milind | | |
| Bhai | 714 | "Sajna Sajni" | Anand–Milind | | |
| Dharma Karma | 715 | "Alag Alag Nahi Rehna" | Bappi Lahiri | | |
| Ganga Maange Khoon | 716 | "Chand Kahe Jo" | Rajkamal | | Kumar Sanu |
| Ganga Maange Khoon | 717 | "Saajan Saajan" | Rajkamal | | Shabbir Kumar |
| Ganga Maange Khoon | 718 | "Hey Nageshwar" | Rajkamal | | Kavita Krishnamurti |
| Gundagardi | 719 | "Sooraj Ka Ishq" | Jatin–Lalit | | |
| Gundagardi | 720 | "Aankhon Hi" | Jatin–Lalit | | |
| Gupt: The Hidden Truth | 721 | "Mere Sanam" | Viju Shah | | |
| Hameshaa | 722 | "Hameshaa" | Anu Malik | | |
| Hameshaa | 723 | "Neela Dupatta" | Anu Malik | | Abhijeet Bhattacharya |
| Hameshaa | 724 | "Ae Dil Hamen Itna" | Anu Malik | | |
| Hero No. 1 | 725 | "Mohabbat Ki Nahin" | Anand–Milind | | |
| Hero No. 1 | 726 | "Tum Hum Pe Marte Ho" | Anand–Milind | | |
| Humein Jahan Pyar Mile | 727 | "Dil E Nadaan" | Dilip Sen - Sameer Sen | | Sachin |
| Humein Jahan Pyar Mile | 728 | "Didi Karegi Shingar" | Dilip Sen - Sameer Sen | | Nirja |
| Ishq | 729 | "Tu Jhootha" | Anu Malik | | Udit Narayan, Alka Yagnik, Abhijeet Bhattacharya |
| Jeevan Yudh | 730 | "Raja Kaise Bethun Tohari" | Nadeem–Shravan | | |
| Kalyug Ka Arjun | 731 | "Sapne Sajane" | Vidyasagar | | Udit Narayan |
| Lahu Ke Do Rang | 732 | "Sagar Mein Tarang Hai" | Anand–Milind | | |
| Mahaanta | 733 | "Tere Bin Main Hu Kya" | Laxmikant–Pyarelal | | |
| Mere Sapno Ki Rani | 734 | "Chupke Chupke" | Anand–Milind | | |
| Mere Sapno Ki Rani | 735 | "Chhama Chaka" | Anand–Milind | | |
| Mrityudand | 736 | "Raat Maheke" | Anand–Milind | | |
| Mrityudand | 737 | "Itani Hai Mori" | Anand–Milind | | |
| Mrityudand | 738 | "Kab Se Main" | Anand–Milind | | |
| Mrityudand | 739 | "Tum Bin Man Ki" | Anand–Milind | | |
| Prithvi | 740 | "Jis Ghadi Tujhko"(Duet) | Viju Shah | | |
| Qahar | 741 | "Dil Junglee Kabootar" | Anand–Milind | | |
| Sanam | 742 | "Kal Tak Jo Maine Na" | Anand–Milind | | |
| Sanam | 743 | "Sanam Ka Naam Aaye" | Anand–Milind | | |
| Sapnay | 744 | "Chanda Re" | A. R. Rahman | | |
| Share Bazaar | 745 | "Barsat Ki Raaton Mein" | Utpal Biswas | | |
| Share Bazaar | 746 | "Pyar Ke Kabil To Samjha" | Utpal Biswas | | |
| Suraj | 747 | "Sajana Chodo" | Anand–Milind | | |
| Swati | 748 | "Kuhu Kuhu Gati" | M. M. Kreem | | |
| Swati | 749 | "Pinjre Ke"(Solo) | M. M. Kreem | | |
| Swati | 750 | "Pinjre Ke"(Duet) | M. M. Kreem | | |
| Tarazu | 751 | "Mujhe Na Chup" | Rajesh Roshan | | |
| Udaan | 752 | "Chahun Tujhe" | Anand–Milind | | |
| Yeshwant | 753 | "Badi Mushkil Mein" | Anand–Milind | | |
| Zameer: The Awakening of a Soul | 754 | "Mujhe Ek Ladki" | Anand–Milind | | |

=== 1998 ===
| Film | No | Song | Composer(s) | Writer(s) | Co-artist(s) |
|---|---|---|---|---|---|
| Aag Aur Teezab | 755 | "Khushboo Yeh Fiza" | Mahesh - Kishore | | |
| Aunty No. 1 | 756 | "China China China" | Anand–Milind | | Kumar Sanu, Udit Narayan, Poornima |
| Badmaash | 757 | "Hon Tha Jo Ho Gaya" | Shyam - Surendar | | |
| Badmaash | 758 | "Aachal Dhalne De" | Shyam - Surendar | | |
| Dand Nayak | 759 | "Bahut Dur Jane Do" | Rajesh Roshan | | Sonu Nigam |
| Dil Kho Gaya | 760 | "Aap Yeh Sochke" | Rais Bhartiya | | |
| Dil Kho Gaya | 761 | "Aashiqui Humne Ki" | Rais Bhartiya | | |
| Dil Kho Gaya | 762 | "Chali Yeh Vaada" | Rais Bhartiya | | |
| Dil Kho Gaya | 763 | "Chand Dekha" | Rais Bhartiya | | |
| Dil Kho Gaya | 764 | "Dil Kho Gaya" | Rais Bhartiya | | |
| Dil Kho Gaya | 765 | "Tujhe Pyar Karte" | Rais Bhartiya | | |
| Dil Kho Gaya | 766 | "Dil Kho Gaya"(Remix) | Rais Bhartiya | | |
| Doli Saja Ke Rakhna | 767 | "Jhula Bahon Ka"(Version l) | A. R. Rahman | | |
| Doli Saja Ke Rakhna | 768 | "Jhula Bahon Ka"(Version ll) | A. R. Rahman | | |
| Gunda | 769 | "Tum Bin Jeena" | Anand Raaj Anand | | |
| Hero Hindustani | 770 | "Deewana Deewana" | Anu Malik | | |
| Hitler | 771 | "Dil Tujhe Dungi" | Dilip Sen - Sameer Sen | | |
| Humse Badhkar Kaun | 772 | "Teri Zulfo" | Viju Shah | | |
| Jeans | 773 | "Ajooba Hain" | A. R. Rahman | | |
| Jiyaala | 774 | "Mera Dil Dhadakta" | Atamash | | |
| Kudrat | 775 | "Humse Mohabbat Mein" | Rajesh Roshan | | |
| Mafia Raaj | 776 | "Mainu Laagi Hai" | Dilip Sen - Sameer Sen | | |
| Manmohini | 777 | "Rasme Wafa Hum" | Bappi Lahiri | | Mohd Nazim |
| Mehndi | 778 | "Dulhan Koi Jab" | Babul Bose | | |
| Mehndi | 779 | "Mohabbat Main Duniya" | Babul Bose | | |
| Military Raaj | 780 | "Gulaabi Hai Gulaabi" | Bappi Lahiri | | |
| Prem Aggan | 781 | "Khatey Hain Kasam" | Anu Malik | | |
| Prem Aggan | 782 | "Tere Pyar Ki Aag Mein" | Anu Malik | | |
| Prem Aggan | 783 | "Har Dam Dam Bedam"(Duet) | Anu Malik | | |
| Qila | 784 | "Laayi Hai Mehndi" | Anand Raaj Anand | | |
| Qila | 785 | "Prem Hai Radha" | Anand Raaj Anand | | |
| Sar Utha Ke Jiyo | 786 | "Deewana Deewana" | Anand–Milind | | |
| Vinashak – Destroyer | 787 | "Kho Diye" | Viju Shah | | |
| Yeh Aashiqui Meri | 788 | "Itna Toh Kehde" | Ajit Varman | | |
| Yeh Aashiqui Meri | 789 | "Waah Re Waah" | Ajit Varman | | |
| Yeh Hai Muqaddar Ka Sikander | 790 | "Balkhati Boondon Ka" | Bappi Lahiri | Brij Bihari | Sudesh Bhosle |
| Yeh Hai Muqaddar Ka Sikander | 791 | "Piya Sun" | Bappi Lahiri | Brij Bihari | solo |
| Zanjeer: The Chain | 792 | "Chahe Din Ho" | Anand–Milind | | |
| Zulm-O-Sitam | 793 | "Dil Tujhe Main Dunga" | Aadesh Shrivastava | | |

=== 1999 ===
| Film | No | Song | Composer(s) | Writer(s) | Co-artist(s) |
|---|---|---|---|---|---|
| Aaya Yauwan Jhoom Ke | 794 | "Aya Sagnowali Raat" | Babu Kishan | | Kumar Sanu |
| Anyay Hi Anyay | 794 | "Kahi Phul Honge" | R. D. Burman | | |
| Anyay Hi Anyay | 795 | "Mai Sath Chal" | R. D. Burman | | |
| Anyay Hi Anyay | 796 | "Tujhe Dhup Ka" | R. D. Burman | | |
| Bahke Kadam | 797 | "O Jaaneja" | Shabbu - Pintu | | |
| Bahke Kadam | 798 | "Pyar Karna Hai" | Shabbu - Pintu | | |
| Bahke Kadam | 799 | "Ruk Ja Tu" | Shabbu - Pintu | | |
| Bahke Kadam | 800 | "Tere Bina" | Shabbu - Pintu | | |
| Dahek | 801 | "Sawan Barse Tarse Dil" | Anand–Milind | | |
| Dahek | 802 | "Koi Kaha Kare" | Anand–Milind | | |
| Devi | 803 | "Tu Meri" | Devi Sri Prasad | | |
| Dil Ka Sauda | 804 | "Ranjhe Ki Kasam" | Baba Jagirdar | | Udit Narayan |
| Earth | 805 | "Banno Rani" | A. R. Rahman | Javed Akhtar | solo |
| Gair | 806 | "Mera Dil Meri Jaan" | Anand–Milind | | |
| Ganga Ki Kasam | 807 | "Hame Pata Hai" | Bappi Lahiri | | |
| Ganga Ki Kasam | 808 | "Hai Rabba" | Bappi Lahiri | | |
| Hindustan Ki Kasam | 809 | "Yaara Teri Ghoot" | Sukhwinder Singh | | |
| Hindustan Ki Kasam | 810 | "Tere Dil Mein" | Sukhwinder Singh | | |
| Hote Hote Pyar Ho Gaya | 811 | "O Jaane Jaa" | Anand Raaj Anand | | |
| Kahani Kismat Ki | 812 | "Aao Bana Lein" | Dilip Sen - Sameer Sen | | |
| Kahani Kismat Ki | 813 | "Tu Hi Jaan Hai" | Dilip Sen - Sameer Sen | | |
| Love You Hamesha | 814 | "Gup Chup Baatein" | A. R. Rahman | | |
| Mast | 815 | "Pucho Na Yaar" | Sandeep Chowta | | |
| Mother | 816 | "Chaar Chaar Duni Aath" | Dilip Sen - Sameer Sen | | Vipin Sachdeva |
| Mr. Romeo | 817 | "Mil Hi Gaye" | A. R. Rahman | | |
| Nyaydaata | 818 | "Preet Ka Deep" | Shyam Surendhar | | |
| Raja Aur Rangili | 819 | "Mujhko Tumse Pyar" | Bappi Lahiri | | Abhijeet Bhattacharya |
| Raja Aur Rangili | 820 | "Pholon Ke Jaisa" | Bappi Lahiri | | Vinod Rathod |
| Sagar Kanya | 821 | "Sapnaa" | M. M. Kreem | | |
| Sagar Kanya | 822 | "Pyaari Pyaari" | M. M. Kreem | | |
| Safari | 823 | "Tumse Mohabbat" | Syhyam - Mohan | | |
| Safari | 824 | "Kluk Kluk" | Syhyam - Mohan | | |

=== 2000 - 2005 ===
| Year | Film | No | Song | Composer(s) | Writer(s) | Co-artist(s) |
|---|---|---|---|---|---|---|
| 2000 | Aaghaat | 825 | "Kaisa Jadoo Kiya" | Sukhwinder Singh | Naqsh Lyallpuri | Udit Narayan |
| 2000 | Aaghaat | 826 | "Meri Paayal Chhan Chhan Bole" | Sukhwinder Singh | Naqsh Lyallpuri | |
| 2000 | Aashiq Hai To Dilbar Ko Pehchan | 827 | "O Chanda" | Syed Ahmed | Nawab Arzoo | solo |
| 2000 | Anjaane | 828 | "Kaale Kaale Baadal" | Rajesh Roshan | | Kumar Sanu, Narendra Chanchal |
| 2000 | Anjaane | 829 | "Huye Hai Kuchh" | Rajesh Roshan | | Suresh Wadkar |
| 2000 | Astitva | 830 | "Gaana Mere Baas Ki" | Sukhwinder Singh | | |
| 2000 | Astitva | 831 | "Gaana Mere Baas Ki"(Version ll) | Sukhwinder Singh | | |
| 2000 | Club Dancer No. 1 | 832 | "Nashe Se Hum" | Zack Bros | | Amit Kumar |
| 2000 | Club Dancer No. 1 | 833 | "Pyar Se Lo Zara Naam" | Zack Bros | | solo |
| 2000 | Gang | 834 | "Dil Hai Bechain" | Anu Malik | | |
| 2000 | Jai Shakumbhari Maa | 835 | "Meri Sunle Re" | Ravindra Jain | | solo |
| 2000 | Jis Desh Mein Ganga Rehta Hain | 836 | "O Piya O Piya" | Anand Raj Anand | | |
| 2000 | Jungle | 837 | "Sorry Baba" | Sandeep Chowta | | |
| 2000 | Kaali Topi Laal Rumaal | 838 | "Jabse Tere Mere" | Dilip Sen - Sameer Sen | | |
| 2000 | Krodh | 839 | "Mamta Bhare" | Anand–Milind | | |
| 2000 | Krodh | 840 | "Mamta Bhare"(Female) | Anand–Milind | | |
| 2000 | Krodh | 841 | "Mamta Bhare"(Version lll) | Anand–Milind | | |
| 2000 | Le Chal Apne Sang | 842 | "Sathi O Mere Sathi" | Raamlaxman | | |
| 2000 | Le Chal Apne Sang | 843 | "Raja Khaike To Dekho" | Raamlaxman | | |
| 2000 | Mela | 844 | "Mela Dilon Ka" | Anu Malik | | Alka Yagnik, Udit Narayan, Sonu Nigam, Shankar Mahadevan, Poonam |
| 2000 | Vaalee | 845 | "Koyi Haseena" | Deva | | |
| 2001 | Chhupa Rustam: A Musical Thriller | 846 | "Tu Hain Mere Dil Mein" | Anand–Milind | | |
| 2001 | Chingari Aur Sholay | 847 | "Jis Din Ka Kar Rahi Thi" | Anand–Milind | | solo |
| 2001 | Dal The Gang | 848 | "Tu Mil Gaya" | Shyam Surendar | | |
| 2001 | Faulad No 1 | 849 | "Teri Nazar"(Version l) | Ghulam Ali | | |
| 2001 | Faulad No 1 | 850 | "Teri Nazar"(Version ll) | Ghulam Ali | | |
| 2001 | Hindustan | 851 | "Tere Pyaar Mujhe" | Shyam-Surender | | Kumar Sanu |
| 2001 | Hindustan | 852 | "Aaj Jaane Ki Zid" | Shyam-Surender | | solo |
| 2001 | Indian | 853 | "Jaana Maine" | Anand Raaj Anand | | Abhijeet Bhattacharya |
| 2001 | Inteqam | 854 | "Dil Bole" | Jitin-Shyam | Suroor Lucknowi | solo |
| 2001 | Josh-E-Jawaani | 855 | "Ek Do Teen Char" | Sawan Kumar | | Kumar Sanu |
| 2001 | Kasam | 856 | "O Pardesi Babu" | Viju Shah | | |
| 2001 | Kasam | 857 | "Teri Dhapli Meri Payal" | Viju Shah | | |
| 2001 | Khatron Ke Khiladi | 858 | "Allah Teri Duhaai" | Ram Shankar | | solo |
| 2001 | Kyo Kii... Main Jhuth Nahin Bolta | 859 | "Suno Miya Suno" | Anand Raaj Anand | | |
| 2001 | Lagaan | 860 | "Oh Paalanhaare" | A. R. Rahman | | Lata Mangeshkar |
| 2001 | Naag Shakti | 861 | "Naa Milthi Apnonki" | Hamsalekha | | |
| 2001 | Pyaar Ishq Aur Mohabbat | 862 | "Jab Tujhe Maine" | Viju Shah | | |
| 2001 | Pyaar Ishq Aur Mohabbat | 863 | "Pyaar Ishq Aur Mohabbat" | Viju Shah | | |
| 2002 | 16 December | 864 | "Dil Mera Ek Tara" | Karthik Raja | | |
| 2002 | Aaj Ka Devi Putra | 865 | "Chanda Ki" | Mani Sharma | | |
| 2002 | Angaar The Fire | 866 | "Gore Gore Hathon Pe" | Reobin Chatterge | | |
| 2002 | Angaar The Fire | 867 | "Bas Ek Do Mulakatein" | Reobin Chatterge | | |
| 2002 | Amma | 868 | "O Mere Kangana" | Uttam Chatterjee | | solo |
| 2002 | Amma | 869 | "Sajna Sajna" | Uttam Chatterjee | | solo |
| 2002 | Amma | 870 | "Rani Teri Akhiyon" | Uttam Chatterjee | | solo |
| 2002 | Amma | 871 | "Rani Teri Akhiyon" (sad) | Uttam Chatterjee | | solo |
| 2002 | Annarth | 872 | "Whisky Pila De" | Anand Raaj Anand | | |
| 2002 | Badmaash No. 1 | 873 | "Bolo Bolo" | Bappi Lahiri | Naqsh Lyallpuri, P K Mishra, Mahender Dalvi | solo |
| 2002 | Chhal | 874 | "Chup Chaap"(Female) | Viju Shah | | |
| 2002 | Dil Dhoondta Hai | 875 | "Tum To Meri Jaan Ho" | Anu Malik | | |
| 2002 | Dil Mein Basakar Dekho | 876 | "Tumne Kiya Ishara" | Shyam-Surender | | Babul Supriyo |
| 2002 | Dil Vil Pyar Vyar | 877 | "Ab Ke Saawan Mein" | Babloo Chakravarthy | | |
| 2002 | Durga | 878 | "Do Dil Humne" | Vidyasagar | | |
| 2002 | Durga | 879 | "Thodi Si Shararat" | Vidyasagar | | |
| 2002 | Encounter: The Killing | 880 | "Giridhar Ke Rang Mein" | Amar Mohile | | |
| 2002 | Indra The Tiger | 881 | "Radhe Govinda" | Mani Sharma | | Udit Narayan |
| 2002 | Indra The Tiger | 882 | "Yeh Haseen Chehra" | Mani Sharma | | Hariharan |
| 2002 | Kaaboo | 883 | "Chhanan Chhanan" | Anchal Talesara | | |
| 2002 | Kaaboo | 884 | "Mujhe Dekhe Muskuraye" | Anchal Talesara | | |
| 2002 | Kehtaa Hai Dil Baar Baar | 885 | "Deewano Ko Pata Hai" | Jatin–Lalit | | |
| 2002 | Maseeha | 886 | "Subh Sawaray" | Anand Raaj Anand | | |
| 2002 | Pardesi Re | 887 | "O Jaane Jaana" | Sujeet | | |
| 2002 | Pardesi Re | 888 | "Hum Hai Ishq" | Sujeet | | |
| 2002 | Saathiya | 889 | "Chupke Se" | A. R. Rahman | | |
| 2002 | Saathiya | 890 | "Naina Milaike" | A. R. Rahman | | |
| 2002 | Shaheed-E-Azam | 891 | "Aashiqon Ke Aangan Mein" | Maqbool Khan, Sabar Ali, Sardool Sikander | | |
| 2002 | The Truth: The Yathharth | 892 | "Dil Mein Jo"(Duet) | Murlidhar | | |
| 2002 | The Truth: The Yathharth | 893 | "Dil Mein Jo"(Female) | Murlidhar | | |
| 2003 | 2 October | 894 | "Chaand Taaron Mein" | AK Vyas | | |
| 2003 | Baaz: A Bird in Danger | 895 | "Chehre Pe" | Ismail Darbar | | |
| 2003 | Baaz: A Bird in Danger | 896 | "Aye Subah"(Duet) | Ismail Darbar | | |
| 2003 | Baaz: A Bird in Danger | 897 | "Aye Subah"(Female) | Ismail Darbar | | |
| 2003 | Boys | 898 | "Boom Boom" | A. R. Rahman | | Adnan Sami |
| 2003 | Chura Liyaa Hai Tumne | 899 | "Dil Hai Mera" | Himesh Reshammiya | | Udit Narayan |
| 2003 | Dabdaba | 900 | "Aaj Ki Raat" | Dilip Dutta & Ravi | | |
| 2003 | Escape From Taliban | 901 | "Rimil Baba" | Babul Bose | | Babul Supriyo, Sonu Nigam |
| 2003 | Hawayein | 902 | "Hawayein" | Babbu Maan | | |
| 2003 | Hawayein | 903 | "Bhangra Paa Laiye" | Babbu Maan | | |
| 2003 | Humein Tumse Pyar Ho Gaya Chupke Chupke | 904 | "Oh Dilruba Oh Sajna" | Bappi Lahiri | | |
| 2003 | Hungama | 905 | "Chain Aap Ko" | Nadeem–Shravan | | |
| 2003 | Jai Vaibhav Laxmi Maata | 906 | "Jai Vaibhav Laxmi Mata" | Murlidhar | | |
| 2003 | Jodi Kya Banayi Wah Wah Ramji | 907 | "December Ka Mahina" | Anand Raaj Anand | | |
| 2003 | Kal Ho Naa Ho | 908 | "Maahi Ve" | Shankar–Ehsaan–Loy | Javed Akhtar | Shankar Mahadevan, Madhushree, Sonu Nigam, Udit Narayan |
| 2003 | Kucch To Hai | 909 | "Hai Rey" | Anu Malik | | |
| 2003 | Kucch To Hai | 910 | "Kya Pyaar Karoge" | Anu Malik | | |
| 2003 | Kuch Naa Kaho | 911 | "Kuch Naa Kaho" | Shankar–Ehsaan–Loy | | |
| 2003 | Maa Santhoshi Maa | 912 | "Na Mangu Mein" | Viswajeet | | |
| 2003 | Mahima Kashi Vishwanth Ki | 913 | "Karpoor Gauram" | Ram Shankar | | |
| 2003 | Mahima Kashi Vishwanth Ki | 914 | "Shivratri Aayee" | Ram Shankar | | |
| 2003 | Miss India The Mystery | 915 | "Nasha" | Suresh Pai | | |
| 2003 | Pinjar | 916 | "Shaba Ni Shaba" | Uttam Singh | | |
| 2003 | Pinjar | 917 | "Sita Ko Dekhe" | Uttam Singh | | |
| 2003 | Pyaar Kiya Nahin Jaatha | 918 | "Raaste Yahan" | Anand Raaj Anand | | |
| 2003 | Qayamat: City Under Threat | 919 | "Aitbaar Nahi Karna"(Duet) | Nadeem–Shravan | | |
| 2003 | Tujhe Meri Kasam | 920 | "Koi To Meri Fariyad" | Viju Shah | | |
| 2003 | Tujhe Meri Kasam | 921 | "Pal Pal Soch Mein" | Viju Shah | | |
| 2003 | Warriors of Heaven and Earth | 922 | "Har Lamha" | A. R. Rahman | | |
| 2004 | 30 Days | 923 | Pal Pal Dil Mera Jalta | Krishnendu Das | | |
| 2004 | Dil Ne Jise Apna Kahaa | 924 | "Jaane Bahara" | A. R. Rahman | | |
| 2004 | Ek Se Badhkar Ek | 925 | "Don Don" | Anand Raaj Anand | | |
| 2004 | Hulchul | 926 | "Hum Dil Ke" | Vidyasagar | | |
| 2004 | Hum Tum | 927 | "Chak Dr Saare Gham" | Jatin–Lalit | | |
| 2004 | Inteqam: The Perfect Game | 928 | "Aayee Holi Aayee" | Anand–Milind | | |
| 2004 | Ishq Qayamat | 929 | "Meri Aankhon" | Bobby Rahman | | |
| 2004 | Kuchh To Gadbad Hai | 930 | "Aapka Masoom" | Baba Jagirdar | | |
| 2004 | Kyun! Ho Gaya Na... | 931 | "Aao Na" | Shankar–Ehsaan–Loy | Javed Akthar | Udit Narayan |
| 2004 | Lakshya | 932 | "Kitni Baatein" | Shankar–Ehsaan–Loy | | |
| 2004 | Lakshya | 933 | "Kitni Baatein"(Reprise) | Shankar–Ehsaan–Loy | | |
| 2004 | Madhoshi | 934 | "O Jaane Jaana" | Roopkumar Rathod | | |
| 2004 | Maqbool | 935 | "Jhin Min Jhini" | Vishal Bhardwaj | | |
| 2004 | Maqbool | 936 | "Jhin Min Jhini"(Extended) | Vishal Bhardwaj | | |
| 2004 | Police Force: An Inside Story | 937 | "Chehre Mein" | Anand–Milind | | |
| 2004 | Poochho Mere Dil Se | 938 | "Maine Ek Gori Se" | Babul Bose | | |
| 2004 | Swades | 939 | "Aahista Aahista" | A. R. Rahman | | |
| 2004 | The Unfaithful Hawas | 940 | "Jaaneman Teri Kasam" | Bappi Lahiri | | |
| 2004 | Thoda Tum Badlo Thoda Hum | 941 | "Kalam Haath Mein" | Amar Mohile | | |
| 2004 | Thoda Tum Badlo Thoda Hum | 942 | "Sun Re Peepal" | Amar Mohile | | |
| 2004 | Tu Bal Brahmachari Main Hu Kanya Kunwari | 943 | "Dekthe Hi Tujhe Dil" | Amar - Akbar | | |
| 2004 | Tu Bal Brahmachari Main Hu Kanya Kunwari | 944 | "Main Hoon Prem Pujaran" | Amar - Akbar | | |
| 2004 | Vajra | 945 | "Kitni Haseen Teri" | Narendra Rathi | | |
| 2004 | Woh | 946 | "Zindagi Mein Jod" | Anand Raaj Anand | | |
| 2004 | Woh Tera Naam Tha | 947 | "Jaan Lo Jaan Lo" | Roopkumar Rathod | | |
| 2004 | Yeh Lamhe Judaai Ke | 948 | "Tera Naam Lene Ki" | Nikhil–Vinay | | Kumar Sanu |
| 2004 | Yehi Hai Zindagi | 949 | "Kaise Samajhuani" | Arvind Haldipur | | |
| 2005 | Bhagmati | 950 | "Alvida" | Vishal Bhardwaj | | |
| 2005 | Chandramukhi | 951 | "Para Para" | Vidyasagar | | |
| 2005 | Chandramukhi | 952 | "Laga Paisa" | Vidyasagar | | |
| 2005 | Chandramukhi | 953 | "Raa Raa" | Vidyasagar | | |
| 2005 | Chausar - A Sagar Sarhadi | 954 | "Lai Sandesa" | Jagjit Singh | | |
| 2005 | Ek Hi Bhool | 955 | "Mera Dil Pe Nahin" | Dilip Sen - Sameer Sen | | |
| 2005 | Guptdhan | 956 | "Dil Kahi Lagta" | Dilip Sen - Sameer Sen | | |
| 2005 | Hum Tum Aur Mom | 957 | "Pyar Ka Tarana Hai" | KP | | |
| 2005 | Hum Tum Aur Mom | 958 | "Ek Ladki Meri Zindagi" | KP | | |
| 2005 | Naam Gum Jaayega | 959 | "Tumse Milke Mujhe" | Anand–Milind | | |
| 2005 | Page 3 | 960 | "Mera Wajood"(Female) | Virgin Emi & Samir Tandon | | |
| 2005 | Sanam Hum Aapke Hain | 961 | "Dil Ne Jo Bhi Kaha" | Manoj - Vijay | Murari, Saket | Babul Supriyo |
| 2005 | Shikhar | 962 | "Aap Ko Samjha" | Viju Shah | | |
| 2005 | Silsiilay | 963 | "Meri Jaan" | Himesh Reshammiya | | |
| 2005 | Socha Na Tha | 964 | "Socha Na Tha" | Sandesh Shandilya | | |
| 2005 | Ssukh | 965 | "Shola Badan" | Kamini Khanna | | |
| 2005 | Water | 966 | "Naina Neer Bahaye" | A. R. Rahman | | |
| 2005 | Water | 967 | "Piya Ho" | A. R. Rahman | | |
| 2005 | Water | 968 | "Aayo Re Sakhi" | A. R. Rahman | | |

=== 2006 - till date ===
| Year | Film | No | Song | Composer(s) | Writer(s) | Co-artist(s) |
|---|---|---|---|---|---|---|
| 2006 | Aatma | 969 | "Chori Chori Tum Dil" | Anu Malik | | |
| 2006 | Bold | 970 | "Mujhe O Sanam" | Bappi Lahiri | | Udit Narayan |
| 2006 | Insaaf Ki Jung | 971 | "Hum Banjare Hum Banjare" | Lakshmi - Pawan | | Vinod Rathod |
| 2006 | Insaaf Ki Jung | 972 | "Dhadkan Yeh Kehti" | Lakshmi - Pawan | | |
| 2006 | Jaan-E-Mann | 973 | "Humko Maloom Hai" | Anu Malik | Gulzar | Sonu Nigam |
| 2006 | Jigyaasa | 974 | "Baaton Hi Baaton Mein" | Ram Shankar | | Udit Narayan |
| 2006 | Jigyaasa | 975 | "Meethe Meethe Sapnon Mein" | Ram Shankar | | |
| 2006 | Kudiyon Ka Hai Zamana | 976 | "Jaanam" | Iqbal Darbar, Yasin Darbar | | Shaan |
| 2006 | Love Ke Chakkar Mein | 977 | "Itna Bata Do Hame" | Anand Raaj Anand | | |
| 2006 | Mere Jeevan Saathi | 978 | "Tumko Dulhan" | Nadeem–Shravan | Sameer | Kumar Sanu |
| 2006 | Mere Jeevan Saathi | 979 | "Deewani" | Nadeem–Shravan | Sameer | Abhijeet, Jaspinder Narula |
| 2006 | Mere Jeevan Saathi | 980 | "Ek Masoom Sa" | Nadeem–Shravan | Sameer | Sonu Nigam |
| 2006 | Mr 100 | 981 | "Teri Nazar Ka Ishara" | Vijay Kapoor | | Sonu Nigam |
| 2006 | Pyare Mohan | 982 | "Tu Jahaan Bhi Jayegi" | Anu Malik | Sameer | |
| 2006 | Radha Ne Mala Japi Shyam Ki | 983 | "Hum To Niyam" | Ravindra Jain | | |
| 2006 | Radha Ne Mala Japi Shyam Ki | 984 | "Kabhi Ek Doosre"(Duet) | Ravindra Jain | | |
| 2006 | Radha Ne Mala Japi Shyam Ki | 985 | "Kabhi Majburiyo" | Ravindra Jain | | |
| 2006 | Radha Ne Mala Japi Shyam Ki | 986 | "Sanwra Khatu Bala" | Ravindra Jain | | |
| 2006 | Radha Ne Mala Japi Shyam Ki | 987 | "Tu Hi Mera Babul" | Ravindra Jain | | |
| 2006 | Shiva | 988 | "Kaise Kahein" | Ilaiyaraaja | Gulzar | Roop Kumar Rathod |
| 2006 | Shree Ram Mandhir | 989 | "Jaadu Jaadu" | M. M. Kreem | | |
| 2006 | Shree Ram Mandhir | 990 | "Yeha Yeh Godavari" | M. M. Kreem | | |
| 2006 | Shree Ram Mandhir | 991 | "Charanome Ho Sannidhi" | M. M. Kreem | | |
| 2006 | Shree Ram Mandhir | 992 | "Badrasaila Raj Mandir" | M. M. Kreem | | |
| 2006 | Shree Ram Mandhir | 993 | "Dekho Yaha" | M. M. Kreem | | |
| 2006 | Tirupati Shree Balaji | 994 | "Aaja Aaja" | M. M. Kreem | | |
| 2006 | Tirupati Shree Balaji | 995 | "Moti Chupe" | M. M. Kreem | | |
| 2006 | Tirupati Shree Balaji | 996 | "Adhar Sudha" | M. M. Kreem | | |
| 2006 | Tirupati Shree Balaji | 997 | "Nigam Nigamant" | M. M. Kreem | | |
| 2006 | We R Friends | 998 | "Char Din Ki Chandini" | Anand–Milind | | |
| 2007 | Big Brother | 999 | "Jeevan Tumne Diya Hai" | Sandesh Shandilya & Anand Raaj Anand | | |
| 2007 | Jeena To Hai | 1000 | "Jeena To Hai Har Haal" | Uttsava Anand | | Shaan |
| 2007 | Mr Khujli | 1001 | "Khujli Hai" | Deepak Pandit - Prem Paras | | Shaan, Shraddha Pandit |
| 2007 | Salaam-e-Ishq | 1002 | "Salaam-E-Ishq" | Shankar–Ehsaan–Loy | Sameer | Sonu Nigam, Shreya Ghoshal, Kunal Ganjawala |
| 2007 | Yeh Ishq Nahin | 1003 | "Yeh Raaten Suhani" | Asheesh Thadani | | Suresh Wadkar, Shaan |
| 2008 | Black & White | 1004 | "Jogi Aaya" | Sukhwinder Singh | | Sukhwinder Singh |
| 2008 | Black & White | 1005 | "Jogi Aaya"(Remix) | Sukhwinder Singh | | |
| 2008 | Dashavatar | 1006 | "Mukunda Mukunda" | Himesh Reshammiya | Sameer | Kamal Haasan |
| 2008 | Drona | 1007 | "Nanhe Nanhe" | Dhruv Ghanekar | | Nandini Srikar |
| 2008 | Hello | 1008 | "Mitwa Re" | Sajid–Wajid | | Shaan, Wajid |
| 2008 | Tathagatha Buddha | 1009 | "Preet Kiya" | Shashi Preetam | | |
| 2008 | Kahani Gudiya Ki | 1010 | "Jis Rut Mein Chudiyan" | Prakash Raj | Madan Pal | |
| 2008 | Yaar Meri Zindagi | 1011 | "Yaar Meri Zindagi" | R. D. Burman | | Ranjana Joglekar |
| 2009 | Aseema | 1012 | "Aa Gaye Ho Chalte Chalte" | Shamir Tondon | | |
| 2009 | Chal Chala Chal | 1013 | "Chanchal Hai Aankhein Tumhaari" | Anu Malik | | Shaan |
| 2009 | Chal Chalein | 1014 | "Jhoom Jhoom So Ja" | Ilaiyaraaja | | |
| 2009 | Hum Phirr Milein Na Milein | 1015 | "Tere Dar Ke Siva" | Sandesh Shandilya | | |
| 2009 | Ruslaan | 1016 | "Pyar Ki Parsayee" | Raeess Jaman Khan | | |
| 2010 | 13 May Gulab Nagar | 1017 | "Jis Praani Par Krupa" | Lakshmi - Vasanth | | |
| 2010 | Azaan The Awakening Call | 1018 | "Tu Rahim Hai" | Ravindra Jain | | |
| 2010 | Lava Kusa: The Warrior Twins | 1019 | "Ramayana Divya Katha" | L. Vaidyanathan | | K. S. Chithra |
| 2010 | Lava Kusa: The Warrior Twins | 1020 | "Shree Raghunadhki" | L. Vaidyanathan | | K. S. Chithra |
| 2010 | Robot | 1021 | "Arima Arima" | A. R. Rahman | Swanand Kirkire | Hariharan, Benny Dayal, Naresh Iyer |
| 2011 | Damadamm | 1022 | "Yun Toh Mera Dil" | Himesh Reshammiya | | Himesh Reshammiya |
| 2011 | Jaana Pehchana | 1023 | "Hai Ranj Ka Saamaan" | Ravindra Jain | | |
| 2011 | Jaana Pehchana | 1024 | "Jaisi Bhi Hai Yeh" | Ravindra Jain | | |
| 2012 | Bas Ek Tamanna | 1025 | "Mai Kise Pukaroon" | Omkar | | |
| 2012 | Love Possible | 1026 | "Munna Bada Pyara"(Female) | Afsar - Sajid | | |
| 2012 | Maharana Pratap: The First Freedom Fighter | 1027 | "Pag Ghungharu" | Prem Bhandari | | |
| 2012 | Qayamat Hi Qayamat | 1028 | "Janam Janam" | Anchal Talesaea | | |
| 2012 | Qayamat Hi Qayamat | 1029 | "Nazar Se Nazar" | Anchal Talesaea | | |
| 2012 | Vidhata Tere Khel Hai Nirale | 1030 | "Le Chala Ho" | Madhumay | | Udit Narayan |
| 2013 | Bombay Talkies | 1031 | "Apna Bombay Talkies" | Amit Trivedi | | Kumar Sanu, Alka Yagnik, Udit Narayan, Sonu Nigam, Shreya Ghoshal, Sunidhi Chauhan, Shaan, Amit Kumar |
| 2013 | Deewana Main Deewana | 1032 | "Judaa Na Honge Hum" | Bappi Lahiri | | Udit Narayan |
| 2013 | Dekha Jo Pehli Baar | 1033 | "Khushiyon Ki Is Mehfil" | Mickey Narula | | |
| 2013 | Gunja A Wonder Girl | 1034 | "Sun Sun Mere Saathi" | Abuzar | | |
| 2013 | Koi Hai Apna | 1035 | "Guzar Jayenge Din" | Satish Dehra | | |
| 2013 | Mahabharat | 1036 | "Suno Sunao" | Rajendra Shiv | | Anupam Amod, Vijayaa Shanker |
| 2013 | Yahi To Pyar Hai | 1037 | "Hum Dino Aaj Jayenge" | Suraj Dev Sahu | | Udit Narayan |
| 2013 | Yahi To Pyar Hai | 1038 | "Mama Mama" | Suraj Dev Sahu | | Vinod Rathod |
| 2014 | Naari Teri Shakti Anokhi | 1039 | "Tumne Kiya Hai" | Ravindra Jain | | |
| 2014 | Naari Teri Shakti Anokhi | 1040 | "Naya Hai Zamana" | Ravindra Jain | | |
| 2015 | Dum Laga Ke Haisha | 1041 | "Dard Karaara" | Anu Malik | Varun Grover | Kumar Sanu |
| 2015 | Rudramadevi | 1042 | "Naina Tu Sunaina" | Ilaiyaraaja | | Javed Ali |
| 2015 | Rudramadevi | 1043 | "Anthakaran Hai Mehka Huya Sa" | Ilaiyaraaja | | Pamela Jain, Priyanka Bhattacharya |
| 2015 | Tere Ishq Mein Qurbaan | 1044 | "Waqt Nazdeek Hai" | Harsh Vyas | | Udit Narayan |
| 2016 | Shortcut Safari | 1045 | "Ek Dhara Ke Jan Gan" | Rohit Sharma | Rohit Sharma | Atreyi Bhattacharya |
| 2017 | Blue Mountains | 1046 | "Bheeni Bheeni Bhor" | Sandip Surya, Aadesh Srivastava, Monty Sharma | | Suraj Jagan, Yatharth Ratnum |
| 2017 | Game Over | 1047 | "O Re Jaana"(Sad) | Gaurav H. Singh | | Palak Muchhal |
| 2017 | Krina | 1048 | "Krina"(Title Song) | Dilip Sen | | |
| 2017 | Krina | 1049 | "Hey Chandmund Sawarini" | Dilip Sen | | |
| 2017 | Ramratan | 1050 | "Jal Jal Jal Rahi Hain" | Bappi Lahiri | Deepak Sneh | Mohammed Irfan |
| 2021 | Meenakshi Sundareshwar | 1051 | "Meenakshi Sundareshwar Theme" | Justin Prabhakaran | | Vivek Soni |

== Hindi Non-film songs ==
| Year | Album | Song | Music director(s) | Lyricist | Co-singer(s) |
|---|---|---|---|---|---|
| 1996 | Crucial Jam – The Album | "Kitna Pyaar Hum Tumhe Karte Hai" | Rythm Squad and EWC | | Kumar Sanu |
| 2006 | Tirupati Shri Balaji | "Moti Chhupe Hue Hai" | Bhushan Kumar | | Kumar Sanu |
| 2006 | Tirupati Shri Balaji | "Aaja Aaja Priyatama" | Bhushan Kumar | | Kumar Sanu |
| 2006 | Tirupati Shri Balaji | "Adhar Sudha Ras Barse" | Bhushan Kumar | | Vinod Rathod |
| 2006 | Tirupati Shri Balaji | "Nigam Nigmant" | Bhushan Kumar | | Vinod Rathod |
| 2016 | Tum Mujhe Yun Mile | "Sugat Wankhade" | Manish Sharma | | Pankaj Kumar |
| 2016 | Single | "Abhi Sawalo Mein Aye Tum" | Pandit Pawan | | Sajid |
| 2020 | Sitam Gar | "Meri Nigah Mein" | | | Kumar Sanu |
| 2020 | Sitam Gar | "Bin Tere Kuch Bhi Nahin Nai" | | | Udit Narayan |
| 2021 | Single | "Meri Pukaar Suno" | A R Rahman | Gulzar | K.S. Chithra, Alka Yagnik, Shreya Ghoshal, Shashaa Tirupati, Armaan Malik and Asees Kaur |

=== Hindi TV Serial songs ===
| Year | Film | Song | Composer(s) | Writer(s) | Co-artist(s) |
|---|---|---|---|---|---|
| 1994 | Kismat | "Kangana Bole" | Dilip Sen-Sameer Sen | | solo |
| 1994 | Kismat | "Jeevan Toh Sargam Hai" | Dilip Sen-Sameer Sen | | solo |

== Tamil films ==
=== 1996-2000 ===
| Year | Film | Song | Composer(s) | Writer(s) | Co-artist(s) |
|---|---|---|---|---|---|
| 1996 | Coimbatore Mappillai | "Coimbatore Mappillaikku" | Vidyasagar | Vaali | Udit Narayan |
| 1996 | Coimbatore Mappillai | "Oru Theidi Paarthal" | Vidyasagar | Vaali | Hariharan |
| 1996 | Musthaffaa | "Kannukkum Kannukkum" | Vidyasagar | Vairamuthu | Hariharan |
| 1997 | Minsara Kanavu | "Vennilave Vennilave" | A. R. Rahman | Vairamuthu | Hariharan |
| 1997 | Ratchagan | "Nenje Nenje" | A. R. Rahman | Vairamuthu | K. J. Yesudas |
| 1998 | Kizhakkum Merkkum | "Kathunkuyilae" | Ilaiyaraaja | Arivumathi | |
| 1998 | Kizhakkum Merkkum | "Vayasupulla" | Ilaiyaraaja | Arivumathi | |
| 1998 | Naam Iruvar Namakku Iruvar | "Hello Mr. Kadhala" | Karthik Raja | Palani Bharathi | Udit Narayan, Anuradha Paudwal |
| 1998 | Naam Iruvar Namakku Iruvar | "Kattana Ponnu Romantica" | Karthik Raja | Palani Bharathi | Hariharan |
| 1999 | Poovellam Kettuppar | "Chudithar Aninthu" | Yuvan Shankar Raja | Palani Bharathi | Hariharan |
| 1999 | Mannavaru Chinnavaru | "Konji Pesu" | Geethapriyan | | Hariharan |
| 1999 | Nenjinile | "Manasaey Manasaey" | Deva | Kalaikumar | Hariharan |
| 2000 | Alai Payuthey | "Snehithane Snehithane" | A. R. Rahman | Vairamuthu | Srinivas |
| 2000 | Alai Payuthey | "Snehithane Snehithane - II" | A. R. Rahman | Vairamuthu | Ustad Sultan Khan, Srinivas |
| 2000 | Kandukondain Kandukondain | "Konjum Mainakkale" | A. R. Rahman | Vairamuthu | |
| 2000 | Kushi | "Mottu Ondru" | Deva | Vairamuthu | Hariharan |
| 2000 | Rhythm | "Anbe Idhu Nijamdhana" | A. R. Rahman | Vairamuthu | |
| 2000 | Thenali | "Swasame Swasame" | A. R. Rahman | Pa. Vijay | S. P. Balasubrahmanyam |

=== 2001 ===
| Film | Song | Composer(s) | Writer(s) | Co-artist(s) |
|---|---|---|---|---|
| Dumm Dumm Dumm | "Ragasiyamai Ragasiyamai" | Karthik Raja | Vairamuthu | Hariharan, Ramanathan |
| Dumm Dumm Dumm | "Un Perai Sonnale" | Karthik Raja | Vairamuthu | P. Unnikrishnan |
| Citizen | "Chikki Mukki" | Deva | | Shankar Mahadevan |
| Star | "Manasukkul Oru Puyal" | A. R. Rahman | Vairamuthu | S. P. Balasubrahmanyam |
| Poovellam Un Vasam | "Kadhal Vanthathum" | Vidyasagar | Vairamuthu | K. J. Yesudas |
| Samudhiram | "Vidiye Vidiye" | Sabesh–Murali | | Udit Narayan |
| Manadhai Thirudivittai | "Kutti Kutti Panithuliye" | Yuvan Shankar Raja | Pa. Vijay | |
| Manadhai Thirudivittai | "Manjal Kattu Maina" | Yuvan Shankar Raja | Pa. Vijay | Karthik |
| Paarthale Paravasam | "Azhagae Sugama" | A. R. Rahman | Vairamuthu | Srinivas |
| Paarthale Paravasam | "Anbae Sugama" | A. R. Rahman | Vairamuthu | Srinivas |
| Thavasi | "Thandana Thandana Thai Masam" | Vidyasagar | | K. J. Yesudas |
| Samrat Asoka | "Mogathile Kannirandum" | Anu Malik | | Abhijeet Bhattacharya |

=== 2002 ===
| Film | Song | Composer(s) | Writer(s) | Co-artist(s) |
|---|---|---|---|---|
| Azhagi | "Pattu Cholli" | Ilaiyaraaja | Ilaiyaraaja, Palani Bharathi | |
| Azhagi | "Oru Sundari Vandhaalam" | Ilaiyaraaja | Ilaiyaraaja, Palani Bharathi | Unnikrishnan, Malgudi Subha, Arun Mozhi |
| Alli Arjuna | "Onne Onne" | A. R. Rahman | Arivumathi | Shankar Mahadevan |
| Roja Kootam | "Mottugale Mottugale" | Bharadwaj | Vairamuthu | Hariharan |
| Gemini | "Deewana Deewana" | Bharadwaj | Vairamuthu | |
| Run | "Poi Solla Koodadhu" | Vidyasagar | Vairamuthu | Hariharan |
| Run | "Minsaaram En Meethu" | Vidyasagar | Vairamuthu | Harish Raghavendra |
| Run | "Panikaatre Panikaatre" | Vidyasagar | Vairamuthu | Balaram |
| En Mana Vaanil | "Enna Solli Paduvatho" | Ilaiyaraaja | Palani Bharathi | Hariharan |
| En Mana Vaanil | "Rottoram Pattu" | Ilaiyaraaja | Palani Bharathi | K. J. Yesudas, Shruti Haasan |
| Album | "Thattalikkuthey" | Karthik Raja | Vairamuthu | Karthik |
| Album | "Thaazhampoo" | Karthik Raja | Vairamuthu | Ilaiyaraaja |
| Bagavathi | "July Malargale" | Deva | Snehan | Karthik |
| Bagavathi | "Shaayo Shaayo" | Deva | Snehan | Timmy |
| Ramanaa | "Vaanaville"(Duet) | Ilaiyaraaja | Vairamuthu | Hariharan |
| Ramanaa | "Vennilavin" | Ilaiyaraaja | Vairamuthu | Hariharan |
| Ramanaa | "Vaanam Adhirave" | Ilaiyaraaja | Vairamuthu | Unnikrishnan, Bhavatharini |
| Ramanaa | "Vaanaville"(Female) | Ilaiyaraaja | Vairamuthu | |
| Ramanaa | "Vaanaville"(Ilaiyaraaja Version) | Ilaiyaraaja | Vairamuthu | Ilaiyaraaja |
| Villain | "Pathinettu Vayathil" | Vidyasagar | Vairamuthu | Udit Narayan |
| Villain | "Hello Hello En Kadhala" | Vidyasagar | Vairamuthu | Anuradha Sriram, Tippu |
| April Maadhathil | "Yeh Nenje" | Yuvan Shankar Raja | Thamarai | Harish Raghavendra |
| Virumbugiren | "Nijama Nijama" | Deva | Vairamuthu | Tippu |
| Virumbugiren | "Thuduk Thuduk" | Deva | Vairamuthu | Unni Menon |

=== 2003 ===
| Film | Song | Composer(s) | Writer(s) | Co-artist(s) |
|---|---|---|---|---|
| Chokka Thangam | "En Jannal" | Deva | Vairamuthu | Hariharan |
| Anbe Sivam | "Poo Vasam"(Version l) | Vidyasagar | Vairamuthu | Sriram Parthasarathy |
| Anbe Sivam | "Poo Vasam"(Version ll) | Vidyasagar | Vairamuthu | Vijay Prakash |
| Vaseegara | "Venaam Venaam" | S. A. Rajkumar | Na. Muthukumar | Udit Narayan |
| Anbu | "Thavamindri Kidaitha Varame" | Vidyasagar | Thamarai | Hariharan |
| Manasellam | "Nilavinile Oli" | Ilaiyaraaja | Palani Bharathi | Hariharan |
| Manasellam | "Kaiyil Deepam" | Ilaiyaraaja | Muthulingam | |
| Manasellam | "Ilaya Nadhi" | Ilaiyaraaja | Vaali | Srinivas |
| Manasellam | "Nee Thoongum Nerathil" | Ilaiyaraaja | Palani Bharathi | |
| Konji Pesalaam | "Unnai Thedi Thedi" | Ilaiyaraaja | Palani Bharathi | |
| Konji Pesalaam | "Aathara Sruthi" | Ilaiyaraaja | Mu. Metha | Karthik |
| Konji Pesalaam | "Ezhu Vannam" | Ilaiyaraaja | Mu. Metha | Karthik |
| Dum | "Chanakya Chanakya" | Srikanth Deva | Pa. Vijay | |
| Kadhal Sadugudu | "Putham Puthiyadada" | Deva | Vairamuthu | Unnikrishnan |
| Anbe Anbe | "Anbe Anbe" | Bharadwaj | Palani Bharathi | Hariharan |
| Parasuram | "Kadhal Vettukkili" | A. R. Rahman | Kabilan | Karthik |
| Anbe Un Vasam | "Ore Oru Parvaiyai" | Dhina | Pa. Vijay | Karthik |
| Priyamaana Thozhi | "Maankuttiye" | S. A. Rajkumar | Pa. Vijay | |
| Thithikudhe | "Mainave Mainave" | Vidyasagar | Pa. Vijay | Unnikrishnan |
| Boys | "Boom Boom" | A. R. Rahman | Kabilan | Adnan Sami, A. R. Rahman |

=== 2004 ===
| Film | Song | Composer(s) | Writer(s) | Co-artist(s) |
|---|---|---|---|---|
| Engal Anna | "Muthan Muthalaga" | Deva | | Hariharan |
| Udhaya | "Udhaya Udhaya" | A. R. Rahman | Arivumathi | Hariharan |
| Kuthu | "Nibuna Nibuna" | Srikanth Deva | Kalaikumar | |
| New | "Kalaiyil Dinamum" | A. R. Rahman | Vaali | Unnikrishnan |
| New | "Spiderman" | A. R. Rahman | Vairamuthu | Kunal Ganjawala |
| Vasool Raja MBBS | "Kaadu Thirandhe" | Bharadwaj | Vairamuthu | Hariharan |
| Madhurey | "Kandaen Kandaen" | Vidyasagar | | Madhu Balakrishnan |
| Manmadhan | "Manmadhane Nee" | Yuvan Shankar Raja | Snehan | |
| Aai | "Meyau Meyau" | Srikanth Deva | | Srikanth Deva, Ganga |
| Ramakrishna | "Viruppam Illaya" | Deva | | |
| Ramakrishna | "Kokku Chikokku" | Deva | | Karthik |
| Ramakrishna | "Peiyum Mazhiyamma" | Deva | | Deva, Karthik |
| Gomathi Nayagam | "Valaiyosai Valaikindrathe" | M. Jayachandran | | Hariharan |
| Thendral | Vaanavillin Vannam | Vidyasagar | Yugabharathi | |
| Desam | "Kettenaa Naan" | A. R. Rahman | Vaali | Mohammad Aslam |

=== 2005 ===
| Film | Song | Composer(s) | Writer(s) | Co-artist(s) |
|---|---|---|---|---|
| Ayya | "Oru Vaarthai Kekka" | Bharadwaj | Vairamuthu | KK |
| London | "En Uyire" | Vidyasagar | | Madhu Balakrishnan |
| Karka Kasadara | "Minmini Kangalil" | Prayog | R. V. Udhayakumar | |
| February 14 | "Laila Majnu" | Bharadwaj | Na. Muthukumar | Karthik |
| Chanakya | "Romba Azhagu" | Srikanth Deva | | Karthik |
| Daas | "Sakka Podu Pottane" | Yuvan Shankar Raja | Viveka | KK |
| Ponniyin Selvan | "Siruthooral" | Vidyasagar | | Srinivas |
| Oru Naal Oru Kanavu | "Katril Varum Geethame" | Ilaiyaraaja | Vaali | Shreya Ghoshal, Bhavatharini, Hariharan, Ilaiyaraaja |
| Anbe Aaruyire | "Thigu Thigu" | A. R. Rahman | Vaali | Blaaze |
| Majaa | "Sollitharava Sollitharava" | Vidyasagar | | Madhu Balakrishnan |
| Bambara Kannaley | "Bambara Kannaley" | Srikanth Deva | Kabilan | Udit Narayan |
| Kanda Naal Mudhal | "Merke Merke" | Yuvan Shankar Raja | Thamarai | Shankar Mahadevan |
| Power of Women | "Maragadha Mazhaithuli" | Vidyasagar | Arivumathi | Hariharan |
| Pon Megalai | Aalapanai" | Ilaiyaraaja | Palani Bharathi | Bhavatharini |

=== 2006 ===
| Film | Song | Composer(s) | Writer(s) | Co-artist(s) |
|---|---|---|---|---|
| Saravana | "Kadhal Sutthude" | Srikanth Deva | | Naresh Iyer |
| Aathi | "Atthi Atthikka" | Vidyasagar | Pa. Vijay | S. P. Balasubrahmanyam |
| Kalvanin Kadhali | "Eno Kangal" | Yuvan Shankar Raja | Na. Muthukumar | Yuvan Shankar Raja |
| Thiruttu Payale | "Thaiyya Tha" | Bharadwaj | | |
| Kaivantha Kalai | "Sutti Poove" | Dhina | Vairamuthu | Karthik |
| Nee Venunda Chellam | "Yetthanai Janmam" | Dhina | | Harish Raghavendra |
| Nenjirukkum Varai | "Oru Murai Piranthen" | Srikanth Deva | Thamarai | Hariharan |
| Manathodu Mazhaikalam | "Kangal Thedudhey"(Female) | Karthik Raja | | Jassie Gift |
| Manathodu Mazhaikalam | "Aayiram Vanavil" | Karthik Raja | | Madhu Balakrishnan |
| Manathodu Mazhaikalam | "Kangal Thedudhey"(Humming) | Karthik Raja | | Jassie Gift |
| Varalaru | "Kaatril" | A. R. Rahman | Vairamuthu | S. P. Balasubrahmanyam, Reena Bhardwaj |
| Thagapansamy | "Ariyaamala" | Srikanth Deva | | Balaram |
| Adaikalam | "Uyire Piriyathe" | Sabesh–Murali | | Hariharan |
| By2: Iruvar Mattum | "Azhaga Azhaga" | Vijay Antony | Vairamuthu | Hariharan |
| By2: Iruvar Mattum | "Poovin Madiyil" | Vijay Antony | Vairamuthu | Hariharan |
| By2: Iruvar Mattum | "Roja Poovin" | Vijay Antony | Vairamuthu | Hariharan |

=== 2007 ===
| Film | Song | Composer(s) | Writer(s) | Co-artist(s) |
|---|---|---|---|---|
| Aalwar | "Solli Tharava" | Srikanth Deva | Vaali | Mohammed Salamat |
| En Uyirinum Melana | "Pacchai Pudavai" | Deva | | |
| Kireedam | "Akkam Pakkam" | G. V. Prakash Kumar | Na. Muthukumar | |
| Koodal Nagar | "Tamil Selvi Tamil Selvi" | Sabhesh-Murali | | Hariharan |
| Manase Mounama | "Achutha Azhagai" | Naga | | Hariharan |
| Mirugam | "Adiyathi Yathi" | Sabesh–Murali | | |
| Nenjai Thodu | "Puthu Vasam" | Srikanth Deva | | Hariharan |
| Ninaithaley | "Naanthaana Naanthaana" | Vijay Antony | Vijay Sagar | |
| Ninaithu Ninaithu Parthen | "Naana Yaar Ithu" | Joshua Sridhar | | |
| Pon Megalai | "Aalapanai" | Ilaiyaraaja | Palani Bharathi | Bhavatharini |
| Thirumagan | "Thirumagane" | Deva | Vairamuthu | |

=== 2008 ===
| Film | Song | Composer(s) | Writer(s) | Co-artist(s) |
|---|---|---|---|---|
| Pidichirukku | "Kaatrodu Solli" | Manu Ramesan | | Karthik |
| Bheemaa | "Enadhuyire" | Harris Jayaraj | Yugabharathi | Nikhil Mathew, Chinmayi, Sowmya Raoh |
| Pazhani | "Yaaro Ennidam" | Srikanth Deva | | Karthik |
| Jodhaa Akbar (D) | "Manmohana" | A. R. Rahman | Vairamuthu | |
| Pirivom Santhippom | "Kandum Kanaamal" | Vidyasagar | Yugabharathi | |
| Indiralohathil Na Azhagappan | "Nan Oru Thevathai" | Sabesh–Murali | | Madhu Balakrishnan |
| Tharagu | "Manasum Manasum" | Bharani | Aandal Priyadarshini | |
| Tharagu | "Vada Vada" | Bharani | Muthurasan | S. P. Charan |
| Tharagu | "Poda Poda" | Bharani | Na. Muthukumar | Udit Narayan |
| Dasavathaaram | "Mukunda Mukunda" | Himesh Reshammiya | Vaali | Kamal Haasan |
| Kuselan | "Om Zarare" | G. V. Prakash Kumar | Vaali | K. S. Chithra, Daler Mehndi |
| Satyam | "En Anbae" | Harris Jayaraj | Pa. Vijay | Benny Dayal |
| Jayamkondaan | "Sutri Varum Boomi" | Vidyasagar | Pa. Vijay | |
| Abhiyum Naanum | "Pacchai Kaatre" | Vidyasagar | Yugabharathi | |
| Thiruvannamalai | "Solla Solla" | Srikanth Deva | | Hariharan |

=== 2009 ===
| Film | Song | Composer(s) | Writer(s) | Co-artist(s) |
|---|---|---|---|---|
| Naan Kadavul | "Amma Un Pillai" | Ilaiyaraaja | Vaali | |
| 1977 | "Enathu Uyire" | Vidyasagar | Pa. Vijay | Madhu Balakrishnan |
| Aarumaname | "Chithiram Pesuthadi" | Srikanth Deva | Snehan | Harish Raghavendra |
| Malayan | "Unnai Pola" | Dhina | Pa. Vijay | |
| Ainthaam Padai | "Chinna Kolunthanare" | D. Imman | Gangai Amaren | |
| Guru En Aalu | "Kadhal Kannadiyil" | Srikanth Deva | Pa. Vijay | Prasanna Rao |
| Peraanmai | "Yera Thaala" | Vidyasagar | Vairamuthu | |
| Madurai Sambavam | "Oru Ilavum Panju" | John Peter | Pa. Vijay | Harish Raghavendra |
| Kandhakottai | "Unnai Kadhali Endru" | Dhina | Yugabharathi | Naresh Iyer |
| Kandhakottai | "Kadhal Pambu" | Dhina | Yugabharathi | Benny Dayal |
| Palaivana Solai | "Megame" | Bobby | Vairamuthu | |
| Suriyan Satta Kalloori | "Guru Brahma Guru Vishnu" | Deva | | Hariharan |
| Aarumugam | "Yamini Yamini" | Deva | | Hariharan |
| Mathiya Chennai | "Un Vazhve" | Ilaiyaraaja | Vaali | |
| Naan Avanillai 2 | "Sollamaley" | D. Imman | Yugabharathi | |
| Thee | "Nee Illamal" | Srikanth Deva | Yugabharathi | Madhu Balakrishnan |
| Yen Ippadi Mayakkinai | "Nee Yannai Ninaithai" | Lakshman Ramalinga | | |
| Ethirmarai | "Rojapoovin" | Murugan Mohan | | Murugan Mohan |
| Ethirmarai | "Yenna Kanditai" | Murugan Mohan | | Srinivas |

=== 2010 - present ===
| Year | Film | Song | Composer(s) | Writer(s) | Co-artist(s) |
|---|---|---|---|---|---|
| 2010 | Magane En Marumagane | "Yaaradhu Yaaradhu" | Dhina | Na. Muthukumar | |
| 2010 | Pen Singam | "Poo Pookkum Satham" | Deva | Vairamuthu | |
| 2010 | Enthiran | "Arima Arima" | A. R. Rahman | Vaali | Hariharan |
| 2010 | Mynaa | "Kaiyya Pudi" | D. Imman | Yugabharathi | Naresh Iyer |
| 2010 | Baana Kaathadi | "En Nenjil" | Yuvan Shankar Raja | Na. Muthukumar | |
| 2010 | Naane Ennul Illai | "Naane Ennul Illai" | Amaresh Ganesh | Snehan | Hariharan |
| 2010 | Naane Ennul Illai | "Naane Ennul Illai"(Classical Theme) | Amaresh Ganesh | Snehan | Hariharan |
| 2010 | Thottupaar | "Thottu Thottu" | Srikanth Deva | Kabilan | |
| 2010 | Maasi | "Kandenae Kadhal" | Dhina | | Hariharan |
| 2010 | Virudhagiri | "Pookkal Endrom" | Sundar C. Babu | Na. Muthukumar | |
| 2010 | Aattanayagann | "Pattam Poochi" | Srikanth Deva | Kabilan | Karthik |
| 2010 | Unakkaga En Kadhal | "Unakkaka En Kadhal"(Duet) | Sanjeev–Darshan | Piraisoodan | Tippu |
| 2010 | Ithanai Maalai Engirunthai | "Nenjukkullea" | Dhina | | Madhu Balakrishnan |
| 2010 | Kodi | "Thiluse Thiluse" | Bharani | | Srinivas |
| 2010 | Kodi | "La La La Nethan Manmadhana" | Bharani | | |
| 2010 | Kodi | "Koodi Nilavugal" | Bharani | | Unnikrishnan |
| 2011 | Rowthiram | "Adiye Un Kangal" | Prakash Nikki | Lalithanand | Udit Narayan |
| 2011 | Puli Vesham | "Boy Friend" | Srikanth Deva | Kabilan | Shravya, Spandana |
| 2011 | Suzhal | "Solla Vanthean"(Duet) | L. V. Ganesan | | Hariharan |
| 2011 | Suzhal | "Solla Vanthean"(Female) | L. V. Ganesan | | |
| 2011 | Agarathi | "Vaanam Enbadhe" | Sundar C Babu | Thamarai | Karthik |
| 2011 | Ayyan | "Manasoram" | Ilaiyaraaja | Kabilan | Sriram Parthasarathy |
| 2012 | Udumban | "Kaatrilellam Inbam" | Balan | | Hariharan |
| 2012 | Aathi Narayana | "Kanna Nee" | Srikanth Deva | | |
| 2012 | Eppadi Manasukkul Vanthai | "Nee Vantha Pinnale" | AJ Daniel | | |
| 2012 | Isai Ennum Puthumozhi | "Unnidam Thanthene" | MR Raheis | | Vijay Yesudas |
| 2014 | Kochadaiiyaan | "Medhuvaagathan" | A. R. Rahman | Vaali | S. P. Balasubrahmanyam |
| 2014 | Thirumanam Enum Nikkah | "Kannukkul Potthivaippen" | M. Ghibran | Parvathy | Charulatha Mani, Vijay Prakash, Dr. Ganesh |
| 2014 | Kalavaadiya Pozhuthugal | "Kuttramulla" | Bharadwaj | | Hariharan |
| 2014 | Aranmanai | "Sonnathu Sonnathu" | Bharadwaj | | Harini |
| 2014 | Azhagiya Pandipuram | "Kadavulidam" | Bharadwaj | | Prasanna |
| 2015 | Puriyadha Anandam Puthithaga Arambam | "Dhum Dhum" | A. R. Reihana | Gangai Amaren | |
| 2015 | Baby | "Unakkendru Ennai Tharuven" | Sathesh-Harish | | |
| 2015 | Vaaimai | "Bhoomiye Saamiye" | Augath | | |
| 2015 | Rudhramadevi | "Unnal Un Munnal" | Ilaiyaraaja | Pa. Vijay | Hariharan |
| 2015 | Rudhramadevi | "Anthapuratthil" | Ilaiyaraaja | Pa. Vijay | K. S. Chithra, Chinmayi |
| 2016 | Nijama Nizhala | "Ninaithen Ninaithen" | Subu Siva | Kabilan | |
| 2016 | Saaral | "Kannala Thakkura" | Ishaan Dev | Murugan Mandhiram | Ishaan Dev |
| 2018 | Genius | "Silu Silu" | Yuvan Shankar Raja | Vairamuthu | |
| 2019 | Action | "Nee Sirichaalum" | Hiphop Tamizha | Pa. Vijay | Jonita Gandhi, Srinisha Jayaseelan |
| 2020 | Yaadhumagi Nindraai | "Amma Amma"(Duet) | Bharadwaj | | Prasanna |
| 2023 | Web | Ulagamaai Irunthayae | Karthik Raja | Arun Bharathi | |

== Kannada films ==
| Year | Film | Song | Composer(s) | Writer(s) | Co-artist(s) |
|---|---|---|---|---|---|
| 2001 | Hoo Anthiya Uhoo Anthiya | "Chanda Ee Chanda" | Karthik Raja | K. Kalyan | |
| 2004 | Kanchana Ganga | "Noorondu Chooragi" | S. A. Rajkumar | K. Kalyan | |
| 2005 | News | "Naanu Jeetendra" | Gurukiran | V. Manohar | Gurukiran |
| 2006 | Pandavaru | "Kaayuthaliruva Kannige" | Hamsalekha | | Kunal Ganjawala |
| 2007 | Ee Bandhana | "Chanda Nanna Chandramukhi" | Mano Murthy | Jayanth Kaikini | Udit Narayan |
| 2008 | Hrudaya I Miss You | "Hrudaya Hrudaya" | Ram Shankar | Sarvesh Bidar | Abhijeet Sawant |
| 2009 | Shivamani | "Nee Hinde Bandaga" | Veer Samarth | | Hariharan |
| 2009 | Savaari | "Marali Mareyagi" | Manikanth Kadri | Sudheer Atthavar | |
| 2009 | Prem Kahani | "Badavara Manege" | Ilaiyaraaja | V. Nagendra Prasad | |
| 2011 | Neneyuve Ninna | "Nambu Satya Heltheeni" | C. R. Bobby | M. D. Hasham | Udit Narayan |
| 2012 | Gandhi Smiles | "Hani Hani" | Veer Samarth | | Udit Narayan |
| 2012 | Parie | "Mugilina Maathu" | C. R. Bobby | Sudheer Atthavar | Udit Narayan |
| 2013 | Dirty Picture: Silk Sakkath Maga | "Punaha Punaha" | Jassie Gift | Kaviraj | Javed Ali |
| 2014 | Belli | "Belli Belli" | V. Sridhar | V. Sridhar | |
| 2016 | Vardhana | "Modhala Ee Maathu" | Mathews Manu | V. Nagendra Prasad | Santhosh Venky |

== Telugu films ==
| Year | Film | Song | Composer(s) | Co-artist(s) |
|---|---|---|---|---|
| 1997 | Merupu Kalalu | "Vennelave Vennelave" | A. R. Rahman | Hariharan |
| 1997 | Rakshakudu | "Ninne Ninne Thalachinadhi" | A. R. Rahman | K. J. Yesudas |
| 2000 | Sakhi | "Snehithuda Snehithuda" | A. R. Rahman | Srinivas |
| 2000 | Priyuralu Pilichindi | "Palike Gorinka Choodave" | A. R. Rahman | |
| 2000 | Rhythm | "Prema Idhi Nijamena" | A. R. Rahman | |
| 2000 | Ammo! Okato Tareekhu | "Amrutha Kaadale" | Vandemataram Srinivas | |
| 2001 | Tholi Valapu | "My Tumse Pyar Kiya" | Vandemataram Srinivas | Kumar Sanu |
| 2001 | Mrugaraju | "Sathamaana Mannadhile" | Mani Sharma | Hariharan |
| 2001 | Paravasam | "Cheliya Kushalam"(Version l) | A. R. Rahman | S. P. Balasubrahmanyam |
| 2001 | Paravasam | "Cheliya Kushalam"(Version ll) | A. R. Rahman | S. P. Balasubrahmanyam |
| 2001 | Citizen | "Chikki Bugghaa" | Deva | Shankar Mahadevan |
| 2002 | Holi | "Ne Manasu Naaku Thelusu" | R. P. Patnaik | R. P. Patnaik |
| 2002 | Holi | "Cheliya Cheliyaa" | R. P. Patnaik | KK |
| 2002 | Yuva Rathna | "Sannajaaji Poova" | M. M. Keeravani | Kalyani Malik |
| 2002 | Yuva Rathna | "Sakhiya Yaa Yaa" | M. M. Keeravani | Kumar Sanu |
| 2002 | Manasutho | "Sikakulam Pilla" | Ashirvad | Sukhwinder Singh |
| 2002 | Idi Maa Ashokgadi Love Story | "Neeku Manasista" | Anand–Milind | Abijit Bhattacharya |
| 2002 | Idi Maa Ashokgadi Love Story | "Sitakoka Chilalaa" | Anand–Milind | KK |
| 2002 | Neetho | "Panchaboothala Saakshiga" | Vidyasagar | KK |
| 2002 | Baba | "Baba Neeku Mokkutha" | A. R. Rahman | S. P. Balasubrahmanyam |
| 2002 | Ninu Chusaka Nenundalenu | "Jaajimalli Thotalona" | Ilaiyaraaja | |
| 2002 | Ninu Chusaka Nenundalenu | "Kommallo Koyila" | Ilaiyaraaja | Ilaiyaraaja |
| 2002 | Ninu Chusaka Nenundalenu | "Kondapalli Bondumalli" | Ilaiyaraaja | KK |
| 2003 | Sriramachandrulu | "Palavellila Nuvvu" | Ghantadi Krishna | Hariharan |
| 2003 | Boys | "Prema Idithe Adithe Ani" | A. R. Rahman | Udit Narayan |
| 2003 | Run | "Chali Gaali Chali" | Vidhyasagar | Balram |
| 2003 | Run | "Merupedo Nanu" | Vidhyasagar | Harish Ragavendra |
| 2003 | Run | "Mounalu Yelane Preyasi" | Vidhyasagar | Hariharan |
| 2003 | Villain | "Panchadharaa Chilaka" | Vidhyasagar | Udit Narayan |
| 2003 | Ottesi Cheputunna | "Vennello Vesavi Kalam" | Vidhyasagar | SPB |
| 2003 | Chandu | "Veyi Janmalasha" | K veeru | P. Unnikrishnan |
| 2003 | Neetho Vastha | "Muddulantinchave" | Madhavapeddi Suresh | |
| 2003 | Mee Intikosthe Yem Istharu Maa Intikosthe Yem Testharu | "Aa Devudi Varame Nuvvu" | Ghantadi krishna | Kumar Sanu |
| 2003 | Vishnu | "Ravoyee Chanda" | Ismail Darbar | Udit Narayan |
| 2003 | Vishnu | "Nee Pere Thana" | Ismail Darbar | Sonu Nigam |
| 2004 | Naani | "Pedave Palikina Matallone" | A. R. Rahman | P. Unnikrishnan |
| 2004 | Prem Nagar | "Eedu Rangula Pre" | Anu Malik | Sonu Nigam |
| 2004 | Prem Nagar | "L O V E ke" | Anu Malik | KK |
| 2004 | Love Today | "Cheppave O Chirugaali" | Vidhyasagar | |
| 2004 | Letha Manasulu | "Aanati Mana Cheli" | M. M. Keeravani | |
| 2004 | Koduku | "Mila Mila Merise" | Vandemataram Srinivas | |
| 2005 | Naa Oopiri | "Konchem Konche" | Deepak Dev | Karthik |
| 2005 | Nayakudu | "Vegu Chukka Subhamani" | Koti | Udit Narayan |
| 2005 | Muddula Koduku | "Chirugaali Momu" | Vidyasagar | Srinivas |
| 2005 | Evadi Gola Vaadidhi | "Kala Kadhuga" | Kamalakar | Karthik |
| 2005 | Nuvvante Naakishtam | "Manasichavanuko" | Koti | SPB, Sonu Nigam |
| 2005 | Nuvvante Naakishtam | "Ollo Dallo" | Koti | Udit Narayan |
| 2005 | Sankranti | "Ela Vacchenamma" | S. A. Rajkumar | Udit Narayan |
| 2005 | Majaa | "Allukunnava" | Vidyasagar | SPB |
| 2006 | Stalin | "Siggutho Chi Chi" | Mani Sharma | Hariharan |
| 2006 | Twinkle Twinkle Little Star | "Durana Vinipinch"(Female) | Ilaiyaraaja | |
| 2006 | Twinkle Twinkle Little Star | "Magic Journey" | Ilaiyaraaja | Shreya Ghoshal |
| 2006 | Raam | "Kurabhani" | Yuvan Shankar Raja | |
| 2007 | Munna | "Manasa Nuvvunde" | Harris Jayaraj | Mahalakshmi Iyer, Haricaharan |
| 2007 | State Rowdy | "Dil See" | M. M. Srilekha | |
| 2007 | Nava Vasantham | "Mooga Manase" | S. A. Rajkumar | Hariharan |
| 2007 | Evadaithe Nakenti | "Mandara Puvanti Manasuna" | Chinna | Udit Narayan |
| 2007 | Anumanaspadam | "Mallelo Illese Chandamama" | Ilaiyaraaja | Hariharan |
| 2007 | Bangaru Konda | "Chilakammaa Cheppindi" | Ghantadi Krishna | |
| 2008 | Krishna | "Tu Mera jil jil o Priyathama" | Chakri | Udit Narayan |
| 2008 | Maska | "Aa Vaipunna Ee Vaipunna" | Chakri | Hariharan |
| 2008 | Nee Sukhame Be Korukunna | "Kannula Vinduga" | Madhavapeddi Suresh | |
| 2008 | Jodhaa Akbar | "Mann Mohana" | A. R. Rahman | |
| 2008 | Dashavatharam | "Mukunda Mukanda" | Himesh Reshammiya | Kamal Haasan |
| 2008 | Sundarakanda | "Yelo Yelo Uyyala" | Vidhyasagar | |
| 2008 | Salute | "Ninnena Nenu Chusthundi" | Harris Jayaraj | Benny Dayal |
| 2008 | Bheema | "O Manasa O Manasaa" | Harris Jayaraj | Chinmayi, Nikhil Mathew |
| 2008 | Michael Madana Kamaraju | "Jum Jum Jummani Prema" | Chakri | Udit Narayan |
| 2009 | Konchem Ishtam Konchem Kashtam | "Panchirey" | Shankar–Ehsaan–Loy | Keerthi Sagathia |
| 2009 | Aakashamantha | "Veeche Gaali lolo" | Vidhyasagar | |
| 2010 | Bhageerathudu | "Enni Janmalaina" | Varikuppala Yadagiri | S. P. Balasubrahmanyam |
| 2010 | Shambo Shiva Shambo | "Kanu Paapalloo Prema" | Sundar C Babu | |
| 2010 | Lava Kusa: The Warrior Twins | "Ramayana Divya" | L. Vaidyanathan | Chithra |
| 2010 | Lava Kusa: The Warrior Twins | "Sri Ragu Ramuni" | L. Vaidyanathan | Chithra |
| 2010 | Robo | "Harima Harima" | A. R. Rahman | Hariharan |
| 2011 | Prema Kaidhi | "Idemiti Katemari" | D. Imman | Naresh Iyer |
| 2011 | Naaku O Loverundi | "Naaku Oka Lover Undhi" | K. M. Radha Krishnan | Hariharan |
| 2014 | Vikrama Simha | "Manasaayeraa" | A. R. Rahman | SPB |
| 2015 | Rudhramadevi | "Anthapuramloo" | Ilaiyaraaja | Chithra, Chinmayi |
| 2015 | Rudhramadevi | "Avuna Neevena" | Ilaiyaraaja | Hariharan |

== Malayalam films ==
| Year | Film | Song | Composer(s) | Co-artist(s) |
|---|---|---|---|---|
| 2011 | Bombay March 12 | "Viriyunnu Kozhiyunnu" | Afzal Yusuf | |
| 2011 | Oru Nuna Kadha | "Ponmulam Thandil" | Midhun Ishwar | Sreekumar Vaikayil |
| 2013 | Ms Lekha Tharoor Kaanunnathu | "Ente Nenjile" | Ramesh Narayan | |
| 2015 | Samrajyam II: Son of Alexander | "Saghi Ninte Neela" | R. A. Shafeer | R. A. Shafeer |

== Bengali film songs ==
| Year | Film | Song | Composer(s) | Co-artist(s) |
|---|---|---|---|---|
| 2002 | Deva | "Ki Kore Je Prem Hoe" | Bappi Lahiri | Kumar Sanu |
| 2002 | Deva | "Bhabini Kakhono Je Ami" | Bappi Lahiri | Kumar Sanu |

== Marathi Songs ==
| Year | Film | Song | Composer(s) | Co-artist(s) |
|---|---|---|---|---|
| 1989 | Pasant Aahe Mulgi | "Ya Nachuya Gavuya" | Rishiraj | Solo |
| 1990 | Patli Re Patli | "Rang Ha Nava Aabhali" | Anil Mohile | Suresh Wadkar |
| 1990 | Tujhi Majhi Jamali Jodi | "Tula Mi Sahaj Pahile" | Rishiraj | Sudesh Bhosle |
| 1990 | Tujhi Majhi Jamali Jodi | "Jawal Jawal Ashi Ye" | Rishiraj | Sudesh Bhosle |
| 1990 | Tujhi Majhi Jamali Jodi | "Hrudayi Tula Bharuni" | Rishiraj | Sudesh Bhosle |
| 1991 | Shame To Shame | "He Viparit Ghadale" | Anil Mohile | Pradnya Khandekar |
| 1993 | Saarech Sajjan | "Ya Rimjhim Rimjhim" | Nandu Honap | Suresh Wadkar |
| 1993 | Saarech Sajjan | "Dhoond Aakash He" | Nandu Honap | Suresh Wadkar |
| 1993 | Zapatlela | "Tujhya Majhya Premachi Godi" | Anil Mohile | Suresh Wadkar |
| 1993 | Zapatlela | "Zap Zap Zapatla" | Anil Mohile | Vinod Rathod, Sudesh Bhosale |
| 1994 | Mayechi Sawali | "Sonyachya Mandirala Soneri" | Prakash Devale | |
| 1994 | Mayechi Sawali | "Mohini Tujhya Swaranchi" | Prakash Devale | Chandrashekar Gadgil |
| 1994 | Bajrangachi Kamal | "Jau Nako Tu Dur Dur" | Anil Mohile | Suresh Wadkar |
| 1995 | Vahinichi Maya | "Jo Jo Re Bala" | Anil Mohile | Solo |
| 1995 | Vahinichi Maya | "Sai Baba" | Anil Mohile | Solo |
| 1995 | Vahinichi Maya | "Kashi Aboli Aaj Baharli" | Anil Mohile | Suresh Wadkar |
| 2000 | Dhani Kunkavacha | "Nako Ha Durava" | Shashank Powar | Suresh Wadkar |
| 2003 | Suryodhay Ek Navi Pahat | "Gandhit Ya Bhavanancha" | Manoj Shalendra | Suresh Wadkar |
| 2003 | Suryodhay Ek Navi Pahat | "Shapit Mazi Preeti" | Manoj Shalendra | Solo |
| 2003 | Suryodhay Ek Navi Pahat | "Kashi Avadasa Aali" | Manoj Shalendra | Solo |
| 2005 | Davbindu | "Majhya Othavar Aahe" | Mahesh Naik | Solo |
| 2005 | Mee Tulas Tujhya Angani | "Mee Tulas Tujhya Angani" | Nandu Honap | Solo |
| 2005 | Mee Tulas Tujhya Angani | "Mee Tulas Tujhya Angani"(Sad) | Nandu Honap | Solo |
| 2005 | Munnabhai S.S.C | "Swapn Dile Tu" | Chinar Mahesh | Solo |
| 2005 | Sarivar Sari | "Onjalit Majhya" | Bhaskar Chandavarkar | Solo |
| 2005 | Sarivar Sari | "Saanjh Jhali Tari"(Female) | Bhaskar Chandavarkar | Solo |
| 2005 | Soon Ladki Sasarchi | "Ek Hoti Chimani" | Nandu Honap | Solo |
| 2006 | Aai Shappath | "Dhag Datuni Yetat" | Ashok Patki | Solo |
| 2006 | Aai Shappath | "Dis Char Jhale" | Ashok Patki | Solo |
| 2006 | Anandache Jhaad | "Tula Shodhta Shodhta" | Ashok Patki | Solo |
| 2006 | Hirwa Chuda | "Hirwa Chuda Puresa" | Nirmal B Pawar | Arun Ingle |
| 2006 | Hirwa Chuda | "Ho Aaj Maich" | Nirmal B Pawar | Arun Ingle, Krushna |
| 2006 | Hirwa Chuda | "Hirwa Chuda Piresa"(Sad) | Nirmal B Pawar | Solo |
| 2006 | Hirwa Chuda | "Tu Asa Naraz Ka" | Nirmal B Pawar | Solo |
| 2007 | Gadhvacha Lagna | "Indradarabari Nache" | Bal Palsule | Solo |
| 2008 | Ek Daav Sansaracha | "Tuzi Lekare" | Ashok Patki | Suresh Wadkar |
| 2008 | Ek Daav Sansaracha | "Ghara Ghara Boka" | Ashok Patki | Suresh Wadkar |
| 2008 | Ek Daav Sansaracha | "Navlakh Payari" | Ashok Patki | Suresh Wadkar |
| 2008 | Hari Om Vithala | "Dhani Maza Ghardhani" | Abhijat Joshi | Solo |
| 2008 | Sakhi | "Anandachya Dhara" | Ashok Patki | Swapnil Bandodkar |
| 2008 | Sakhi | "Pahile Paaul" | Ashok Patki | Solo |
| 2008 | Sakhi | "Ye Saad Jivannachi" | Ashok Patki | Solo |
| 2008 | Sakhi | "Jhali Punha"(Female) | Ashok Patki | Solo |
| 2008 | Foreignchi Patlin | "Thatate Sansar Majha" | Ashok Patki | Solo |
| 2008 | Gondya Martay Tangda | "Nashib Aamcha Khotta" | Raamlaxman | Vaishali Samant |
| 2009 | Zak Marli Baiko Keli | "Suravana Ya Talachi" | Raamlaxman | Suresh Wadkar |
| 2009 | Zak Marli Baiko Keli | "Zak Marli N Baiko Keli" | Raamlaxman | Nandesh Umap |
| 2010 | Dho Dho Pavsatil One Day Match | "Jaatos Tu Kothe" | Rajesh Sawat | Solo |
| 2010 | Dho Dho Pavsatil One Day Match | "Chhand Asaa Majh" | Rajesh Sawat | Solo |
| 2011 | Swarajya Marathi Paul Padte Pudhe | "Na Nazar Kunachi" | Nitin Hiverkar | Solo |
| 2013 | Chabu Palali Sasarla | "Tan Na Na" | Ashok Patki | Swapnil Bandodkar |
| 2013 | Chabu Palali Sasarla | "Jari Tu Thithe Jari" | Ashok Patki | Kumar Sanu |
| 2013 | Chabu Palali Sasarla | "Zagad Zagad Ditusta" | Ashok Patki | Kumar Sanu |
| 2015 | Chandrakor | "Panyamadhe Disla Bai" | Vijay Ghatlivar | Solo |
| 2016 | Lord Of Shingnapur | "Bali Umar" | Farhan Shaikh | Roopkumar Rathod |
| 2017 | Brave Heart | "Ubha Janma Java" | Arnub Chatterjee | Solo |
| 2018 | Bucket List | "Houn Jau Dya" | Rohan - Rohan | Shaan, Shreya Ghoshal |
| 2018 | Dr. Tatyaa Lahane | "Kalokhala Bhedun Taku" | 1 Hindustani | Virag Madhumalati |
| 2018 | Mol | "Takya Lain" | Avinash–Vishwajeet | Solo |
| 2019 | Dome | "Ghumato Manat" | Sandeep Dange | Swapnil Bandodkar |
| 2019 | Dome | "Jau Nako Sakhya Dur" | Sandeep Dange | Solo |
| 2019 | Menka Urvashi | "Saya Maheri Alya Ga" | Rajesh Sarkate | Amruta Fadnavis |
| 2019 | Menka Urvashi | "Maze Rani Sod Abola" | Rajesh Sarkate | Aashish Natekar |
| 2019 | Menka Urvashi | "Yamunecha Ghat" | Rajesh Sarkate | Solo |
| 2020 | Ibhrat | "Jagude Hi Preet"(Sad) | Baban Adagale, Ashok Kamble | Jasraj Joshi |
| 2023 | Lai Jhakaas | "Holi Re Holi" | Sachin Pilgaonkar | Sanjayraj GauriNandan |

== Bhojpuri Songs ==
| Year | Film | Song | Composer(s) | Co-artist(s) |
|---|---|---|---|---|
| 2003 | Beri Bhaeel Pardesi | "Beri Bhaeel Pardesi"(Duet) | Sunil Chhaila Bihari, Ashok Ghayal | Kumar Sanu |
| 2003 | Beri Bhaeel Pardesi | "Tu Hin Amar Suhag Ho" | Sunil Chhaila Bihari, Ashok Ghayal | |
| 2003 | Beri Bhaeel Pardesi | "Lagta Hi Pyaar Ho Gaeel" | Sunil Chhaila Bihari, Ashok Ghayal | Udit Narayan |
| 2006 | Ab Ta Banja Sajanwa Hamaar | "Naina Milaai Jadu Chalai" | Bhushan Dua | |
| 2006 | Pyaar Mein Tohar Ude Chunaria | "Pyaar Mein Tohar Ude Chunaria" | | Javed Ali |
| 2006 | Pyaar Mein Tohar Ude Chunaria | "Doodh Ke Jaisan" | | Kumar Sanu |
| 2007 | Bhai Hoke To Bharat Nihan | "Kehu Dekhe Lihi" | Ashoke Goyal | Kumar Sanu |
| 2007 | Baklol Dulha | "Chahe Niman Chahe Baura" | Gunwant Sen, Raaj Sen | |
| 2007 | Khagadiya Wali Bhauji | "Munia Ke Byah" | Chandra Bhushan Pradhan | solo |
| 2007 | Khagadiya Wali Bhauji | "Hamro Pati Hamro Rehte" | Chandra Bhushan Pradhan | Suresh Anand |
| 2009 | Prem Ke Rog Bhail | "Hay Aa Gail" | Kumarjeet | Kumar Sanu |
| 2009 | Prem Ke Rog Bhail | "Pal Bhar Ke Judaai" | Kumarjeet | Kumar Sanu |
| 2009 | Prem Ke Rog Bhail | "Charnon Ke Dhool Sajan" | Kumarjeet | solo |
| 2014 | Dariya Dil | "Har Har Mahadev" | Rajesh Gupta | |
| 2014 | Jung | "Aisan Chehra" | Lal Singh | Kumar Sanu |
| 2014 | Jung | "Pagal Kar Dihala" | Lal Singh | Udit Narayan |

== Gujarati Songs ==
| Year | Film | Song | Composer(s) | Co-artist(s) |
|---|---|---|---|---|
| 1994 | Lal Pili Chundadi | "Lal Pili Chundadi" | Gaurang Vyas | |
| 1994 | Lal Pili Chundadi | "Mara Lilida Ma Va" | Gaurang Vyas | Praful Dave |
| 1994 | Lal Pili Chundadi | "Vatadi Jovu Chhu" | Gaurang Vyas | |
| 1994 | Raj Rajwan | "Gori Lelu Pelu" | Mahesh - Naresh | Praful Dave |
| 1994 | Raj Rajwan | "Chundadi Chetke Che" | Mahesh - Naresh | Praful Dave |
| 1998 | Desh Re Joya Dada Pardesh Joya | "Uncha Uncha" | Arvind Barot | |
| 1998 | Desh Re Joya Dada Pardesh Joya | "Eli Radhadi Re" | Arvind Barot | Arvind Barot |
| 1998 | Desh Re Joya Dada Pardesh Joya | "Ghammar Ghammar" | Arvind Barot | Arvind Barot |
| 1998 | Desh Re Joya Dada Pardesh Joya | "Desh Re Joya Dada" | Arvind Barot | Arvind Barot |
| 2005 | Gam Ma Piyariyu Me Gam Ma Sasariyu | "Kagliyo Ae Lakhu Re" | Arvind Barot | Arvind Barot |
| 2005 | Gam Ma Piyariyu Me Gam Ma Sasariyu | "Gokhete Bethi Rani" | Arvind Barot | |
| 2005 | Gam Ma Piyariyu Me Gam Ma Sasariyu | "Koyal Bole Ku Ku" | Arvind Barot | Arvind Barot |
| 2005 | Gam Ma Piyariyu Me Gam Ma Sasariyu | "Mare Te Gamde Ek" | Arvind Barot | Arvind Barot |
| 2005 | Gam Ma Piyariyu Me Gam Ma Sasariyu | "Radhe Rahde" | Arvind Barot | Arvind Barot |
| 2005 | Gam Ma Piyariyu Me Gam Ma Sasariyu | "Halva Halva Re Dagla" | Arvind Barot | Arvind Barot |
| 2005 | Gam Ma Piyariyu Me Gam Ma Sasariyu | "Pavo Re Vagyo" | Arvind Barot | Arvind Barot |
| 2005 | Gam Ma Piyariyu Me Gam Ma Sasariyu | "Saame Building Ma" | Arvind Barot | |
| 2012 | Vidhata | "Huto Na Na Karti" | Gaurang Vyas | Parthiv Gohli |
| 2012 | Vidhata | "Anganiyama Rangne" | Gaurang Vyas | Arvind Barot |
| 2012 | Vidhata | "Hey Ladi Ladi Lo" | Gaurang Vyas | Arvind Barot |
| 2012 | Vidhata | "Hey Khamma" | Gaurang Vyas | Arvind Barot |
| 2012 | Vidhata | "Hey Rolo Rahruve" | Gaurang Vyas | Arvind Barot |
| 2012 | Vidhata | "Hey Wah Re Vidhi Tara" | Gaurang Vyas | Arvind Barot |
| 2020 | Main To Palavade Bandhi Preet | "Ek Janam Nai Har Janmare" | Gaurang Vyas | Arvind Barot |

=== Non-film Songs ===
| Year | Album | Song | Composer(s) | Co-artist(s) |
|---|---|---|---|---|
| 2008 | Chalisa Sangrah | "Ganpati Chalisa" | Pushpa and Arun Adhikari | solo |

== Nepali Songs ==
| Year | Film | Song | Composer(s) | Writer(s) | Co-artist(s) |
|---|---|---|---|---|---|
| 1992 | Dui Thopa Aansu | "Yo Dui Thopa Aansu" | Ranjit Gazmir | | Kumar Sanu |
| 1993 | Tapasya | "Aaja Sahrai Ramri" | Bhupendra Rayanajhi | Pramod Dhungana | Udit Narayan |
| 1993 | Tapasya | "Yo Mann Timrai" | Bhupendra Rayanajhi | Pramod Dhungana | |
| 1993 | Tapasya | "Sapani Ma" | Bhupendra Rayanajhi | Pramod Dhungana | Raama Mandal |
| 1994 | Dakshina | "Sapana Bhai Aakhama" | Ranjit Gazmer | | 1994 Prithvi(film) Phool Ma Paat Paat Ma Music: Shakti Ballav |
| 2000 | Timro Maya 99 Mero Maya 100 | "Manko Mandirma" | Laxman Shesh | Asgher Ali | Kumar Sanu |
| 2000 | Timro Maya 99 Mero Maya 100 | "Purnimale Chandra Rojyo" | Laxman Shesh | Asgher Ali | Kumar Sanu |
| 2000 | Timro Maya 99 Mero Maya 100 | "Mero Pahilo Prem Laai" | Laxman Shesh | Asgher Ali | solo |
| 2000 | Timro Maya 99 Mero Maya 100 | "Mero Pahilo Prem Laai" (sad) | Laxman Shesh | Asgher Ali | solo |
| 2001 | Darpan Chhaya | "Lahana Le Jurayo" | Ranjit Gazmer | | |
| 2001 | Darpan Chhaya | "Bainshalu Mana Le" | Ranjit Gazmer | | Udit Narayan |
| 2001 | Yo Maya Ko Sagar | "Yo Maya Ko sagar" | Sambhujeet Baskota | | Udit Narayan |
| 2010 | Hatya | "Kalo Kalo Kesh Timro" | Shakti Ballav Shreshtha | Kunar Kancha | |
| 2017 | A Mero Hajur 2 | "Kinideu Na Saila" | Basanta Sapkota | | |

== Odia Songs ==
| Year | Film | Song | Composer(s) | Co-artist(s) |
|---|---|---|---|---|
| 1992 | Kapala Likhana | "Tama Kole Janamiba | Akshaya Mohanty | solo |
| 1992 | Kapala Likhana | "Kalia Sunare Kalia Suna" | Akshaya Mohanty | solo |
| 1992 | Kapala Likhana | "Aare Janha Aa" | Akshaya Mohanty | solo |
| 1992 | Kapala Likhana | "Bada Nirimama Kapaala Likhana" | Akshaya Mohanty | Suresh Wadkar |
| 1992 | Kapala Likhana | "Aaji Khusire Hebi Mun Pagala" | Akshaya Mohanty | Suresh Wadkar, Sudesh Bhosle, Kavita Krishnamurthy |
| 1994 | Gopa Re Badhuchi Kala Kanhei | "Gopa Re Badhuchi Kala Kanhei" | Bachu Mukherjee | Hariharan |
| 1994 | Shraddhanjali | "Phulia Te Deli Mu" | Amarendra Mohanty | Abhijeet Bhattacharya |
| 1994 | Shraddhanjali | "Jhumi Jaa Jaa" | Amarendra Mohanty | solo |
| 1996 | Laxman Rekha | "Nache A Mana Nache" | Akshaya Mohanty | Sonu Nigam, Suresh Wadkar |
| 1996 | Laxman Rekha | "Dhak Dhak Mo Mana" | Akshaya Mohanty | Sonu Nigam |
| 1997 | Kandheyi Aakhire Luha | "Gharaku Sundara Dise" | Amarendra Mohanty | Abhijeet Bhattacharya |
| 1997 | Kandheyi Aakhire Luha | "Jhumuka Thila Bajuna" | Amarendra Mohanty | Udit Narayan |
| 1999 | Maa Pari Kie Heba | "Gavare Malli Phoola" | Biju Swain | Sonu Nigam |
| 1999 | Pabitra Bandhana | "Ru Mo Phula" | Akshaya Mohanty | Sonu Nigam |
| 1999 | Pabitra Bandhana | "Dekhini Mo Tu Pari Ete" | Akshaya Mohanty | Sonu Nigam |
| 1999 | Pabitra Bandhana | "Kabatare Kana Jharakare" | Akshaya Mohanty | Vibhu Kishore |
| 1999 | Pabitra Bandhana | "Lakhere Goti Jemiti" | Akshaya Mohanty | Mohammad Aziz |
| 1999 | Pabitra Bandhana | "Mo Suna Bhauni" | Akshaya Mohanty | solo |
| 2003 | Katha Deithili Maa Kuu | "Ghunghura Bajre Re" | Krushna Chandra | solo |
| 2003 | Katha Deithili Maa Kuu | "To Akhira Aaina" | Krushna Chandra | Babul Supriyo |
| 2004 | Suna Sankhali | "Sola Bayasa Kare Behosa" | Manmath Mishra | solo |
| 2004 | Suna Sankhali | "Aa Janha Aa" (version 1) | Manmath Mishra | solo |
| 2004 | Suna Sankhali | "Aa Janha Aa" (version 2) | Manmath Mishra | solo |
| 2004 | Suna Sankhali | "Maa Mo Maa Kebe Ashibu" | Manmath Mishra | Shweta Mishra |
| 2004 | Suna Sankhali | "Mo Sapanara Raja Pua" | Manmath Mishra | Arabind Dutta |
| 2010 | Tora Mora Jodi Sundara | "Pabana Maguchi Chuma" | | solo |
| 2010 | Asibu Kebe Saji Mo Rani | "Sai Ram" | Gagan Bihari | solo |
| 2012 | Thookol | "Aare Sathi Aa" | | Babul Supriyo |
| 2012 | Thookol | "Jaubana Jaubana" | | Sangeeta Mohapatra, Sangram, Kuna Tripathy |
| 2013 | Salam Cinema | "Om Sai Ram" (female) | | solo |
| 2016 | Sweet Heart | "Leutiba Dine Mora " | | solo |
| 2019 | Gho Gho Rani | "Gho Gho Rani" | Dilip Sen | Kumar Sanu |

=== Non-film songs ===
| Year | Film | Song | Composer(s) | Co-artist(s) | |
|---|---|---|---|---|---|
| 1993 | Chaka Nayana | "Lo Mita" | N/A | solo | |
| 1993 | Chaka Nayana | "Mun Radha" | N/A | solo | |
| 1993 | Chaka Nayana | "Sun Rupa Kichhi" | N/A | solo | |
| 1993 | Chaka Nayana | "Tume Ta Kala Thakura" | N/A | solo | |
| 1999 | Dharma Nikiti | "Aji Mote Miligola" | Deepak Kumar | | Mohammad Aziz |
| 2000 | To Singha Duare | "To Singha Duare" (female) | | solo | |
| 2000 | To Singha Duare | "Kala Megha Dekhi Mayura Nache" | | solo | |
| 2001 | Dharma Debata | "Aare Aare Aa Aji Debi" | Amarendra Mohanty | Sonu Nigam | |
| 2001 | Dharma Debata | "Rani Lo Rani" | Amarendra Mohanty | Sonu Nigam | |
| 2006 | Akhand Deep | "Janita Lo Sakhi" | N/A | solo | |
| 2006 | Akhand Deep | "Tretaya Jaichi" | N/A | solo | |
| 2006 | Akhand Deep | "Bajana Bajana Kanhu" | N/A | solo | |
| 2009 | Radha Pacharile | "Paapi Kahuchhe" | | solo | |
| 2009 | Radha Pacharile | "Jebana Theke Dhukachi Dukha" | | solo | |
| 2009 | Radha Pacharile | "Radharani Panata Re" | | solo | |
| N/A | Kasturi | "Kasturi Mun Kasturi" | N/A | solo | |
| N/A | Kasturi | "Kala Koili" | N/A | solo | |
| N/A | Kasturi | "Megha Re Megha" | N/A | solo | |

== Rajasthani Songs ==
| Year | Film | Song | Composer(s) | Co-artist(s) |
|---|---|---|---|---|
| 1995 | Beti Rajasthan Ri | "Choro Kakra Ke Maye" | Gyan - Laxmi Varma | |
| 2013 | Dastoor | "Thhasu Pahla" | | Kumar Sanu |

== Punjabi Songs ==
| Year | Film | Song | Composer(s) | Co-artist(s) |
|---|---|---|---|---|
| 2006 | Rabb Ne Banaiyan Jodiean | "Kudiye" | Babbu Maan | Babbu Maan |
| 2006 | Rabb Ne Banaiyan Jodiean | "Bootta" | Babbu Maan | Babbu Maan |

== Assamese Songs ==
| Year | Album | Song | Composer(s) | Co-artist(s) |
|---|---|---|---|---|
| 2000 | Mon | Hatore Anguli | Anupam Saikia | Shaan |

== Haryanvi film Songs ==
| Year | Film | Song name(s) | Music director(s) | Co-singer(s) |

== Chattishgarhi Songs ==
| Year | Film | Song name(s) | Music director(s) | Co-singer(s) |
|---|---|---|---|---|
| 2000 | Mayaru Bhauji | "Ae Bhauji" | Kalyan Sen | solo |
| 2000 | Mayaru Bhauji | "Te Bilaspurin" | Kalyan Sen | Vinod Rathod |

== Duets with Hariharan ==
| Year | Song name | Film/Concert name | Music director | Language |
|---|---|---|---|---|
| 1994 | "Gopa Re Badhuchi Kala Kanhei" | Gopa Re Badhuchi Kala Kanhei | Bachu Mukherjee | Odia |
| 1995 | "Tumhe Hum Bahut Pyar" | Jallad | Anand–Milind | Hindi |
| 1996 | "Oru Theidi Parthaal" | Coimbatore Mappillai | Vidhyasagar | Tamil |
| 1996 | "Kannil Kannil" | Mustafa | Vidhyasagar | Tamil |
| 1996 | "Kuch Mere Dil Ne Kaha" | Tere Mere Sapne | Viju Shah | Hindi |
| 1997 | "Raat Meheke" | Mrityudand | Anand–Milind | Hindi |
| 1997 | "Chanda Re" | Sapnay (Dubbed version) | A. R. Rahman | Hindi |
| 1997 | "Vennilave Vennilave" | Minsara Kanavu | A. R. Rahman | Tamil |
| 1997 | "Vennelave Vennelave" | Meruppu Kalalu | A. R. Rahman | Telugu |
| 1998 | "Saawan Barse Tarse Dil" | Dahek | Anand–Milind | Hindi |
| 1998 | "Ajooba Hai" | Jeans | A. R. Rahman | Hindi |
| 1998 | "Tere Pyar Ki Aag" | Prem Agan | Anu Malik | Hindi |
| 1998 | "Hardam Dam Bhadam (Ver.1-2)" | Prem Agan | Anu Malik | Hindi |
| 1998 | "Kattana Ponnu" | Naam Iruvar Namakku Iruvar | Karthik Raja | Tamil |
| 1999 | "Gup Chup Baatein" | Love You Hamesha | A. R. Rahman | Hindi |
| 1999 | "Chudidhar Adaindhu" | Poovellam Kettuppar | Yuvan Shankar Raja | Tamil |
| 1999 | "Konji Pesu" | Mannavaru Chinnavaru | Geethapriyan | Tamil |
| 1999 | "Manasae Manasae" | Nenjinile | Deva | Tamil |
| 2000 | "Mottu Ondru" | Kushi | Deva | Tamil |
| 2001 | "Tu Hai Mere Dil Mein" | Chhupa Rustam | Anand–Milind | Hindi |
| 2001 | "Ragasiyamai" | Dumm Dumm Dumm | Karthik Raja | Tamil |
| 2002 | "Do Dil Humne-Hum Aur Tum" | Durga | Vidhyasagar | Hindi |
| 2002 | "Vennilavin Perai" | Ramanaa | Ilaiyaraja | Tamil |
| 2002 | "Vaanaville (Duet)" | Ramanaa | Ilaiyaraja | Tamil |
| 2002 | "Enna Solli Paduvadho" | En Mana Vaanil | Ilaiyaraja | Tamil |
| 2002 | "Mottugale Mottugale" | Roja Kootam | Bharadwaj | Tamil |
| 2002 | "Poi Solla Koodadhu" | Run | Vidhyasagar | Tamil |
| 2002 | "Mounalu Elane" | Run | Vidyasagar | Telugu |
| 2003 | "Anbe Anbe" | Anbe Anbe | Bharadwaj | Tamil |
| 2003 | "Nilavinile Oliyeduththu" | Manasellam | Ilaiyaraja | Tamil |
| 2003 | "Neethoongum Nerathil (Duet)" | Manasellam | Ilaiyaraja | Tamil |
| 2003 | "Thavamindri Kidaitha 1 & 2" | Anbu | Vidhyasagar | Tamil |
| 2003 | "En Jannal" | Chokka Thangam | Deva | Tamil |
| 2003 | "Muthan Mudhalaga" | Engal Anna | Deva | Tamil |
| 2003 | "Udhaya Udhaya" | Udhaya | A.R. Rahman | Tamil |
| 2003 | "Maankuttiyae (Duet Ver.2)" | Priyamana Thozhi | S. A. Rajkumar | Tamil |
| 2004 | "Kitni Baatein" | Lakshaya | Shankar–Ehsaan–Loy | Hindi |
| 2004 | "Kitni Baatein(Reprise)" | Lakshaya | Shankar–Ehsaan–Loy | Hindi |
| 2004 | "Shatamana Mannadilee" | Mrugaraju | Mani Sharma | Telugu |
| 2004 | "Kaadu Thirande" | Vasool Raja MBBS | Bharadwaj | Tamil |
| 2004 | "Valaiyosai Valaikindrathe" | Gomathy Nayagam | M. Jayachandran | Tamil |
| 2005 | "Uyire Piriyathe" | Adaikalam | Sabesh–Murali | Tamil |
| 2005 | "Maragatha Mazhaithuli" | Power of Women | Vidhyasagar | Tamil |
| 2005 | "Kaatril Varum Geethame" | Oru Naal Oru Kanavu | Ilaiyaraja | Tamil |
| 2005 | "Saanjh Jhali Tari(Duet)" | Sarivar Sari | Bhasakar Chandavarkar | Marathi |
| 2006 | "Azhaga Azhaga" | By2 | Vijay Antony | Tamil |
| 2006 | "Poovin Madiyil" | By2 | Vijay Antony | Tamil |
| 2006 | "Roja Poovin" | By2 | Vijay Antony | Tamil |
| 2006 | "Jabiliki" | Ashok | Mani Sharma | Telugu |
| 2006 | "Siggutho Chi Chi" | Stalin | Mani Sharma | Telugu |
| 2006 | "Orumurai Piranthen" | Nenjirukum Varai | Srikanth Deva | Tamil |
| 2006 | "Jaadu Jaadu" | Sri Ram Mandir | M. M. Kreem | Hindi |
| 2006 | "Hylessaa" | Sri Ram Mandir | M. M. Kreem | Hindi |
| 2006 | "Charanome Ho Sannidhi" | Sri Ram Mandir | M. M. Kreem | Hindi |
| 2006 | "Badrasaila Raj Mandir" | Sri Ram Mandir | M. M. Kreem | Hindi |
| 2007 | "Tamizh Chelvi" | Koodal Nagar | Sabesh–Murali | Tamil |
| 2007 | "Achuta Azaghai" | Manassae Mounama | Naga | Tamil |
| 2007 | "Mooga Manasu " | Navavasantham | S. A. Rajkumar | Telugu |
| 2007 | "Palavellila Nuvvu " | Sri Rama Chanrulu | Ghantadi Krishna | Telugu |
| 2007 | "Mallelo Illelo" | Anumanaspadam | Ilaiyaraja | Telugu |
| 2007 | "Enna Thavam Purindhaen" | Nenjaithodu | Srikanth Deva | Tamil |
| 2007 | "Neloori-Kurukku" | A.R. Rahman Concert | A. R. Rahman | Telugu-Tamil |
| 2008 | "Aa Vaipunna Ee Vaipunna" | Maska | Chakri | Telugu |
| 2008 | "Nee Hinde Bandaga" | Shivamani | Veer Samarth | Kannada |
| 2008 | "Solla Solla" | Thiruvannamalai | Srikanth Deva | Tamil |
| 2008 | "Ay Hairathe" | A.R. Rahman Delhi Concert | A. R. Rahman | Hindi |
| 2008 | "Ghanan Ghanan" | A.R. Rahman Delhi Concert | A. R. Rahman | Hindi |
| 2008 | "Vaari Vaari" | A.R. Rahman Dubai Concert | A. R. Rahman | Hindi |
| 2008 | "Kaadhal Rojave-Roja Janeman" | A.R. Rahman Dubai Concert | A. R. Rahman | Tamil-Hindi |
| 2009 | "Guru Brahmma" | Sooriyan Satta kalluri | Deva | Tamil |
| 2009 | "Yaamini Yaamini" | Aarumugam | Deva | Tamil |
| 2009 | "Pyar Ki Parsayee" | Ruslaan | Raeess Jamal Khan | Hindi |
| 2009 | "Vaaji Vaaji" | A.R. Rahman Pune Concert | A. R. Rahman | Tamil |
| 2010 | "Arima Arima" | Enthiran | A. R. Rahman | Tamil |
| 2010 | "Arima Arima" | Robot | A. R. Rahman | Hindi |
| 2010 | "Arima Arima" | Robot | A. R. Rahman | Telugu |
| 2010 | "Naane Ennul Illai" | Naane Ennul Illai | Amresh Ganash | Tamil |
| 2010 | "Naane Ennul Illai(Classic)" | Naane Ennul Illai | Amresh Ganash | Tamil |
| 2010 | "Kanuppa Pallo-Evare Manna Prema" | Sambho Siva Sambho | Sundar C Babu | Telugu |
| 2010 | "Kandenae Kaadhal" | Maasi | Dhina | Tamil |
| 2010 | "Hanuman Chalisa(Duet)" | The Power Of Hanuman Chalisa | Ashit Desai | Hindi |
| 2011 | "Solla Vanden (Duet)" | Suzhal | L.V. Ganeshan | Tamil |
| 2011 | "Naaku Oka Loverundi" | Naaku O Loverundi | K. M. Radha Krishnan | Telugu |
| 2011 | "Om Bhoor(Duet)" | The Power Of Gayatri | Ashit Desai | Hindi |
| 2011 | "Sri Krishna(Duet)" | The Magic Of Krishna | Ashit Desai | Hindi |
| 2012 | "Kaatrilellam Inbam" | Udumban | Balan | Tamil |
| 2012 | "Chanda Re" | Sa re ga ma pa 2012 | A. R. Rahman | Hindi |
| 2012 | "Kuch Mere Dil Ne Kaha (Bit)" | Sa re ga ma pa 2012 | Viju Shah | Hindi |
| 2012 | "Na Gul Khile Hain (Bit)" | Sa re ga ma pa 2012 | | Hindi |
| 2013 | "Nee Partha Parvaikoru" | Ilaiyaraja Toronto Concert | Ilaiyaraja | Tamil |
| 2013 | "Majhya Savve" | Koknasth | Akshay Hariharan | Marathi |
| 2014 | "Kaatril Varum Geethame" | Ilaiyaraja Madurai Concert | Ilaiyaraja | Tamil |
| 2014 | "Kutramulla" | Kalavaadiya Pozhuthugal | Bharadwaj | Tamil |
| 2015 | "Avuna Neevena" | Rudramadevi | Ilaiyaraja | Telugu |
| 2015 | "Unnal Un Munnal" | Rudramadevi | Ilaiyaraja | Tamil |
| 2015 | "Unnal Un Munnal(Film Version)" | Rudramadevi | Ilaiyaraja | Tamil |

=== Non-film Albums and Singles ===
1. Sadhana Sargam, along with 38 other Indian artists, recorded the National Anthem track commemorating the song's 100th anniversary in 2011.
2. Garaj Garaj Aye Kale Badra, a duet with Sonali Bajpayee, from Cinema Cinema, 1979.
3. Swar Vihar in 1988, music by Kalyanji-Anandji.
4. Nasha Hi Nasha in Sahara, a duet with Kishore Kumar in 1989.
5. Kabhi Aasoon Kabhi Khushboo Kabhi Nagma.
6. Vaada.
7. Oh My Love.
8. Rrahaat.
9. Pehli Nazar.
10. Aaina.
11. Aura of Positivity.
12. Sakhe Wah, a solo classical track, in the music of Rahul Madhukar Ranade.
13. Sarala Swaragala from a Kannada album - "Neralaagi".
14. Itna Na Mujhse Tu Pyar Bada, a duet with Pascal Heni, in 2016.
15. Sargam has recorded a song, Ye Kalam, to empower women's education and rights.

=== TV Serial Title Tracks ===
1. "Ya Sukhano Ya"
2. "Vahinisaheb"
3. "Saavitri"
4. "Kwabhon Ki Dharmiyaan"
5. "Dosh Na Kunacha"
6. "Mi Marathi"
7. "Mangalsutra"
8. "Saibaba"
9. "Basera"
10. "Jhilmil Sitaaron Ka Aangan Hoga"
11. "Kora Kagaz"
12. "Iss Pyaar Ko Kya Naam Doon?"
13. "Kiti Sangaychay mala"
14. "Yeh Un Dinon Ki Baat Hai"
15. Chellamay track in 3 languages
16. Maharani in Telugu and Tamil.

== Television ==
| Year | Series | Song | Composer(s) | Writer(s) | Co-artist(s) | Note(s) |
|---|---|---|---|---|---|---|
| 1988 | Mahabharat | "Binati Suniye" | Raj Kamal | Pandit Narendra Sharma | | Hindi |
| 1988 | Mahabharat | "Main Boondan Bheeji Saari" | Raj Kamal | Pandit Narendra Sharma | | |
| 1988 | Mahabharat | "Mori jhanak jhanak baaje" | Raj Kamal | Pandit Narendra Sharma | | |
| 2005 | Aarthi | "Anbu Endra Desam" | Dhina | Vairamuthu | | Tamil |
| 2009 | Chellame | "Kannukulle Kanavugal" | Dhina | | | Tamil |
| 2011 | Iss Pyaar Ko Kya Naam Doon? | "Iss Pyaar Ko Kya Naam Doon?" | Raju Singh | | Javed Ali | Hindi |
| 2017 | Yeh Un Dinon Ki Baat Hai | "Yeh Un Dinon Ki Baat Hai" (title song) | Anu Malik | | Kumar Sanu | Hindi |
| 2019 | Sembaruthi TV series | "Ragasiyamai Oor Kadhal " (500 episode title song) | Sekar Sai Bharath | | Vijay Prakash | Tamil |
