= List of Hindi films of 1996 =

This is a list of films produced by the Bollywood film industry based in Mumbai in 1996.

== Top-grossing films ==
| No. | Title | Director | Producer | Cast | Worldwide gross |
|---|---|---|---|---|---|
| 1 | Raja Hindustani | Dharmesh Darshan | Cineyug | Aamir Khan, Karishma Kapoor | ₹76.34 crore (US$21.55 million) |
| 2 | Agni Sakshi | Partho Ghosh | Neha Films | Nana Patekar, Jackie Shroff, Manisha Koirala | ₹31.34 crore (US$8.85 million) |
| 3 | Jeet | Raj Kanwar | Nadiadwala Grandson Entertainment | Sunny Deol, Salman Khan, Karishma Kapoor | ₹28.61 crore (US$8.08 million) |
| 4 | Ghatak | Raj Kumar Santoshi | Santoshi Productions | Sunny Deol, Meenakshi Sheshadri | ₹26.57 crore (US$7.5 million) |
| 5 | Khiladiyon Ka Khiladi | Umesh Mehra | DMS Films | Akshay Kumar, Rekha, Raveena Tandon | ₹25.15 crore (US$7.1 million) |
| 6 | Saajan Chale Sasural | David Dhawan | Anas Films | Govinda, Karishma Kapoor, Tabu | ₹23.61 crore (US$6.66 million) |
| 7 | Jaan | Raj Kanwar | Mukta Arts | Ajay Devgan, Twinkle Khanna | ₹17.54 crore (US$4.95 million) |
| 8 | Army | Raam Shetty | Mukul Anand, Nitin Manmohan | Sridevi, Danny Denzongpa, Shah Rukh Khan, Sudesh Berry, Mohnish Behl | ₹17.30 crore (US$4.88 million) |
| 9 | Ajay | Suneel Darshan | Shree Krishna International | Sunny Deol, Karishma Kapoor | ₹16.80 crore (US$4.74 million) |
| 10 | Diljale | Harry Baweja | S. P. Creations; Shemaroo Entertainment | Ajay Devgan, Sonali Bendre, Madhu | ₹15.85 crore (US$4.47 million) |
| 11 | Krishna | Deepak Shivdasani | Time Magnetics | Sunil Shetty, Karishma Kapoor | ₹15.61 crore (US$4.41 million) |
| 12 | Khamoshi: The Musical | Sanjay Leela Bhansali | Sibte Hassan Rizvi | Salman Khan, Manisha Koirala, Nana Patekar, Seema Biswas | ₹14.26 crore (US$4.02 million) |
| 13 | Tere Mere Sapne | Joy Augustine | Amitabh Bachchan ABCL | Chandrachur Singh, Priya Gill, Arshad Warsi, Simran | ₹13.17 crore (US$3.72 million) |
| 14 | Sapoot | Jagdish A. Sharma | Jaidev Thackeray | Akshay Kumar, Suniel Shetty, Karishma Kapoor, Sonali Bendre | ₹11.74 crore (US$3.31 million) |
| 15 | Rakshak | Ashok Honda | Ashok Honda | Suniel Shetty, Karishma Kapoor, Sonali Bendre | ₹11.20 crore (US$3.16 million) |

== Released films ==
| Title | Director | Cast | Genre | Music director |
|---|---|---|---|---|
| Aatank | Prem Lalwani | Dharmendra, Girish Karnad, Nafisa Ali, Hema Malini, Amjad Khan, Kader Khan, Ravi Kishan | Action | Laxmikant–Pyarelal |
| Agni Prem | S. Rukan | Shatrughan Sinha, Rohini Hattangadi, Farheen | Romance | |
| Agni Sakshi | Partho Ghosh | Jackie Shroff, Nana Patekar, Manisha Koirala | Thriller, drama | Nadeem-Shravan |
| Aisi Bhi Kya Jaldi Hai | Sachin Pilgaonkar | Sachin Pilgaonkar, Vivek Mushran, Ashok Saraf, Shrishti Arya | Comedy, romance | |
| Ajay | Suneel Darshan | Sunny Deol, Karisma Kapoor, Reena Roy, Sharat Saxena | Action | Anand Milind |
| Angaara | Anil Ganguly | Mithun Chakraborty, Sadashiv Amrapurkar, Suresh Bhagwat, Hemant Birje | Crime drama | |
| Apne Dam Par | Arshad Khan | Mithun Chakraborty, Govinda, Shilpa Shirodkar, Sonali Bendre | Action | |
| Army | Jatin Thakran | Ravi Kishan, Sridevi, Danny Denzongpa, Mohnish Behl, Ronit Roy, Shah Rukh Khan | Drama | Anand Milind |
| Aur Ek Prem Kahani | Balu Mahendra | Ramesh Aravind, Heera Rajagopal, Revathy, Sudhir Ahuja, Sushma Ahuja, Akshay Anand | Romance, drama | |
| Aurat Aurat Aurat | K. Vishwanath | Rekha, Vinod Mehra, Rakesh Roshan, Aruna Irani, Neeta Mehta | Drama | Laxmikant–Pyarelal |
| Bal Bramhachari | Prakash Mehra, Beendhu Shukla | Puru Raaj Kumar, Karisma Kapoor, Deepak Tijori | Action drama | |
| Bambai Ka Babu | Vikram Bhatt | Saif Ali Khan, Kajol, Atul Agnihotri | Action, romance | Anand–Milind |
| Bandish | Prakash Jha | Juhi Chawla, Guddi Maruti, Paresh Rawal | Comedy, drama, romance | |
| Beqabu | N. Chandra | Sanjay Kapoor, Mamta Kulkarni, Amrish Puri | Action, drama, romance, family | |
| Bhairavi | Arunaraje | Ashwini Bhave, Sridhar, Manohar Singh | Drama, musical, romance | |
| Bhishma | Jagadish A. Sharma | Mithun Chakraborty, Anjali Jathar, Vani Viswanath, Harish | Action | Dileep Sen - Sameer Sen |
| Chaahat | Mahesh Bhatt | Shah Rukh Khan, Naseeruddin Shah, Anupam Kher, Pooja Bhatt, Ramya Krishna | Drama, comedy, thriller | Anu Malik |
| Chall | | Jackie Shroff | | |
| Chhota Sa Ghar | Kalpataru | Asrani, Neelima Azim, Ajinkya Deo | Drama | |
| Chhote Sarkar | Manoj Agarwal | Govinda, Shilpa Shetty | Drama | Anand Milind |
| Daanveer | T. L. V. Prasad | Mithun Chakraborty, Vikas Anand, Anusha, Asrani | Action, crime, drama | |
| Daayraa | Amol Palekar | Nirmal Pandey, Sonali Kulkarni | Drama | |
| Daraar | Abbas–Mustan | Rishi Kapoor, Juhi Chawla, Arbaaz Khan, Johnny Lever, Sushma Seth | Drama, thriller | Anu Malik |
| Dastak | Mahesh Bhatt | Sharad Kapoor, Mukul Dev, Sushmita Sen, Manoj Bajpai | Thriller | Rajesh Roshan |
| Dil Tera Deewana | Lawrence D'Souza | Saif Ali Khan, Twinkle Khanna | Romance, thriller | Aadesh Shrivastava |
| Diljale | Harry Baweja | Ajay Devgn, Sonali Bendre, Madhoo, Amrish Puri, Gulshan Grover | Action | Anu Malik |
| Dushman Duniya Ka | Mehmood Ali | Manzoor Ali, Laila Mehdin, Farida Jalal, Jeetendra, Shah Rukh Khan, Salman Khan | Drama | Anu Malik |
| Dushmani: A Violent Love Story | Bunty Soorma | Sunny Deol, Jackie Shroff, Manisha Koirala | Action, romance | |
| Ek Anari Do Khiladi | Ravi Raja | Raveena Tandon, Balakrishna, Ramya Krishnan | Action, romance, drama | |
| Ek Tha Raja | Dayal Nihalani | Sunil Shetty, Saif Ali Khan, Aditya Pancholi, Neelam Kothari | Romance | Anand Milind |
| English Babu Desi Mem | Praveen Nischol | Shah Rukh Khan, Sonali Bendre, Vivek Vaswani | Romance | Nikhil - Vinay |
| Fareb | Vikram Bhatt | Faraaz Khan, Suman Ranganathan, Milind Gunaji | Thriller | Jatin–Lalit |
| Fire | Deepa Mehta | Nandita Das, Shabana Azmi | Social | A. R. Rahman |
| Gehra Raaz | Ramesh Bedi | Salma Agha, Raj Babbar, Jamuna | | |
| Ghatak | Raj Kumar Santoshi | Sunny Deol, Meenakshi Seshadri, Amrish Puri, Om Puri, Danny Denzongpa | Action, romance | R. D. Burman |
| Hahakaar | Sudarshan K. Rattan | Akshay Anand, Chandni, Neelima Azim | Action, crime, drama | |
| Halo | Santosh Sivan | Benaf Dadachandji, Rajkumar Santoshi, Sahil Choujar | Children's | |
| Hasina Aur Nagina | Gautam Bhatia | Sadashiv Amrapurkar, Jagdeep, Kiran Kumar | | |
| Himmat | Sunil Sharma | Sunny Deol, Shilpa Shetty, Tabu | Action | Anand Milind |
| Himmatvar | Talat Jani | Arun Bakshi, Gajendra Chouhan, Dharmendra | Action | |
| Hukumnama | B.R. Ishara | Amjad Khan, Mukesh Khanna, Rajat Kumar | | |
| Hum Hain Khalnayak | R. Thakur | Arjun, Rajni Bala, Kishore Anand Bhanushali | Action | |
| Hum Hain Premi | Ajay Dixit | Mahesh Anand, Tinnu Anand, Bindu | Romance | |
| Is Raat Ki Subah Nahin | Sudhir Mishra | Tara Deshpande, Akhil Mishra, Smriti Mishra | Thriller | |
| Jaan | Raj Kanwar | Ajay Devgn, Twinkle Khanna, Amrish Puri | Action, romance | |
| Jagannath | | Sangeeta Bijlani, Mukesh Khanna, Rami Reddy | Action | |
| Jay Baba Pashupatinath | Satish Kumar | Shyam Awasthi, Rajdev Jamudhale, Sudhanshu Joshi | | |
| Jeet | Raj Kanwar | Sunny Deol, Tabu, Karisma Kapoor, Salman Khan | Drama | Nadeem-Shravan |
| Jung | T. Rama Rao | Ajay Devgn, Mithun Chakraborty, Sujata Mehta, Rambha | Action drama | |
| Jurmana | T. L. V. Prasad | Rambha, Ashwini Bhave, Mithun Chakraborty | Action | |
| Kalinga | | Jackie Shroff | | |
| Khamoshi: The Musical | Sanjay Leela Bhansali | Salman Khan, Manisha Koirala, Nana Patekar, Seema Biswas, Helen | Social, romance | Jatin–Lalit |
| Khiladiyon Ka Khiladi | Umesh Mehra | Rekha, Akshay Kumar, Raveena Tandon | Action | Anu Malik |
| Khilona | Deepak Pawar | Aditya Pancholi, Monica Bedi | | Naresh Sharma |
| Khoon Ki Pyasi | K.C. Handra | Rita Bhaduri, Ramesh Goyal, Javed Khan | Horror | |
| Krishna | S. Deepak | Sunil Shetty, Karisma Kapoor | Romance, action | Anu Malik |
| Laalchee | Raj N. Sippy | Anil Dhawan, Avtar Gill, Karina Grover, Pran | Drama | Dilip Sen-Sameer Sen |
| Loafer | David Dhawan | Anil Kapoor, Juhi Chawla, Farida Jalal, Gulshan Grover | Comedy | Anand Milind |
| Maachis | Gulzar | Jimmy Shergill, Tabu, Chandrachur Singh, Om Puri | Crime, war | Vishal Bhardwaj |
| Maahir | Lawrence D'Souza | Hema Malini, Govinda, Farha Naaz | Family | |
| Mafia | Aziz Sejawal | Ishrat Ali, Somy Ali, Ali Asghar | Action | |
| Majhdhaar | Esmayeel Shroff | Salman Khan, Manisha Koirala | Drama | Nadeem-Shravan |
| The Making of the Mahatma | Shyam Benegal | Rajit Kapur | Biography | Shantanu Moitra |
| Masoom | Mahesh Kothare | Tinnu Anand, Sulabha Arya, Arun Bakshi, Ayesha Jhulka | Action | |
| Megha | Mohanjee Prasad | Shammi Kapoor, Karisma Kapoor, Rahul Roy | Romance, drama | |
| Mr. Bechara | K. Bhagyaraj | Sridevi, Anil Kapoor, Nagarjuna, Anupam Kher | Comedy, drama | Anand Milind |
| Muqadama | K. C. Bokadia | Vinod Khanna, Aditya Pancholi, Tanuja, Guddi Maruti | Action | |
| Muqaddar | T. L. V. Prasad | Mithun Chakraborty, Moushumi Chatterjee, Ayesha Jhulka, Simran | Action drama | |
| Muthi Bhar Zameen | Tinnu Anand | Danny Denzongpa, Poonam Dhillon, Kumar Gaurav | Action | |
| Namak | Kawal Sharma | Sanjay Dutt, Farah, Nirupa Roy, Gulshan Grover | Action | Anu Malik |
| Nirbhay | Vinod Dewan | Sadashiv Amrapurkar, Sangeeta Bijlani, Mithun Chakraborty | Action | |
| Papa Kehte Hai | Mahesh Bhatt | Jugal Hansraj, Amin Hajee, Dinesh Hingoo | Romance | |
| Papi Gudia | Lawrence D'Souza | Avinash Wadhavan, Karisma Kapoor, Tinnu Anand | Horror, thriller | |
| Phool Bane Patthar | Ambrish Sangal | Mohnish Bahl, Indrani Banerjee, Rakesh Bedi | Action, thriller | Shyam-Surender |
| Prem Granth | Rajiv Kapoor | Rishi Kapoor, Madhuri Dixit, Prem Chopra, Shammi Kapoor | Social, romance | |
| Raja Aur Rangeeli | K.S. Prakash Rao | Mamta Kulkarni | Comedy, romance | |
| Raja Hindustani | Dharmesh Darshan | Karisma Kapoor, Aamir Khan, Johnny Lever | Romance | Nadeem-Shravan |
| Raja Ki Aayegi Baraat | Ashok Gaekwad | Rani Mukerji, Shadaab Khan | Drama | Aadesh Shrivastav |
| Rajkumar | Pankuj Parasher | Naseeruddin Shah, Anil Kapoor, Madhuri Dixit | Drama, fantasy, family, thriller | |
| Rakshak | Ashok Honda | Sunil Shetty, Sonali Bendre, Karisma Kapoor | Action | |
| Ram Aur Shyam | Raju Mavani | Divya Dutta, Sidhant Salaria | Action, crime, drama | |
| Rangbaaz | Kanti Shah | Ishrat Ali, Mithun Chakraborty, Jack Gaud | Action | |
| Return of Jewel Thief | Ashok Tyaagi | Ashok Kumar, Dev Anand, Dharmendra, Jackie Shroff, Madhoo, Shilpa Shirodkar, Anu Aggarwal | Crime | |
| Saajan Chale Sasural | David Dhawan | Govinda, Tabu, Karisma Kapoor, Kader Khan | Comedy, romance | Nadeem-Shravan |
| Sanshodhan | Govind Nihalani | Manoj Bajpai, Vanya Joshi, Kishore Kadam | Drama | |
| Sapoot | Jagdish A. Sharma | Sunil Shetty, Akshay Kumar, Karisma Kapoor, Sonali Bendre, Kader Khan, Johnny Lever | Romance, action, drama | Anu Malik |
| Sardari Begum | Shyam Benegal | Kirron Kher, Surekha Sikri, Amrish Puri | Drama | Vanraj Bhatia |
| Sautela Bhai | B. R. Ishara | Rajesh Khanna, Kumar Gaurav, Deepti Naval | | |
| Shastra | Sanjay Khanna | Sunil Shetty, Anjali Jathar, Danny Denzongpa | Action | Aadesh Srivastava |
| Shikaar | | Urmila Matondkar, Jackie Shroff | | |
| Shohrat | Sathish Ranjan | Mahesh Anand, Aparajita, Asrani | | |
| Smuggler | Ajay Kashyap | Dharmendra, Reena Roy | Action | |
| Spot Boy | Pasha P. Jung | Akshay Anand, Babban, Raj Kiran | | |
| The Square Circle | Amol Palekar | Nirmal Pandey, Sonali Kulkarni, Faiyyaz | Drama, music, romance | |
| Talaashi | | Juhi Chawla, Jackie Shroff | | |
| Tere Mere Sapne | Joy Augustine | Chandrachur Singh, Arshad Warsi, Priya Gill, Simran, Pran | Romance, drama | Viju Shah |
| Tu Chor Main Sipahi | Guddu Dhanoa | Akshay Kumar, Saif Ali Khan, Tabu, Pratibha Sinha | Comedy, drama | Dilip Sen, Sameer Sen |
| Unicorn, the Garden of the Fruits | | Yasef Calderón, Romina Barbar, Hukum Singh | Drama, fantasy | |
| Vijeta | K. Murali Mohan Rao | Sanjay Dutt, Raveena Tandon, Paresh Rawal | Action | Anand Milind |
| Vishwasghaat | Himanshu Brahmbhatt | Sunil Shetty, Anjali Jathar, Anupam Kher | Action | |
| Yaaron Ka Yaar | A. Bhimsingh | Shatrugan Sinha, Leena Chandavarkar, Baba Sehgal | Action drama | |
| Yash | Sharad Sharan | Bijay Anand, Kartika Rane | Musical | |
| Zordaar | Ajay Kashyap | Govinda, Aditya Pancholi, Mandakini, Neelam Kothari | | |

== See also ==
- List of Hindi films of 1997
- List of Hindi films of 1995
