= Homi (name) =

Homi is a name. It may refer to:

- Homi Adajania
- Homi Billimoria, Ceylonese architect
- Homi F. Daji
- Homi J. Bhabha (1909–1966), Indian nuclear physicist
- Homi J. H. Taleyarkhan
- Homi K. Bhabha
- Homi Kharas, British economist
- Homi Maneck Mehta (1871–1948), Indian industrialist
- Homi Master
- Homi Mobed
- Homi Mody
- Homi Motivala (born 1958), Indian sportsperson
- Homi Mullan (1940–2015), Indian percussionist
- Homi Pithawalla or Homer Pithawalla
- Homi Powri (born 1922), Indian cyclist
- Homi Sethna (1923–2010), Indian nuclear scientist
- Homi Wadia (1911–2004), Indian film director and producer in Bollywood (Hindi cinema)
