= Faisal Khan =

Indian Bollywood actor (born 1966)

- Born: 3 August 1966 (age 59); Bombay, Maharashtra, India
- Occupations: Actor, singer
- Years active: 1988–2005, 2015–2022
- Father: Tahir Hussain
- Relatives: Khan–Hussain family

Mohammad Faisal Hussain Khan (born 3 August 1966) is an Indian actor who appears in Hindi films. He is famous for his role as Shankar Shane in Mela.

== Family background ==
Khan is the son of producer Tahir Hussain. His brother is Aamir Khan, who is an actor, director and producer, and he has two sisters, Nikhat Khan, who is a producer and actor, and Farhat Khan. His paternal uncle Nasir Hussain was a film producer and director. His nephew Imran Khan is a former actor. He is a great-grandnephew of Maulana Abul Kalam Azad.

== Career ==
Khan made his first film appearance at the age of three in his uncle Nasir Hussain's 1969 film Pyar Ka Mausam, playing Shashi Kapoor's role as a child. He made his film debut as an adult in 1988, playing a minor role as a villain in his brother Aamir's film Qayamat Se Qayamat Tak. He worked as an assistant director in his father's 1990 film Tum Mere Ho and his cousin Mansoor Khan's Jo Jeeta Wohi Sikander (1992), both starring Aamir in the leading role.

Khan got his first leading role in the 1994 film Madhosh, which was produced by his father and directed by Vikram Bhatt. The film was a box office failure. In 2000, he made his comeback starring alongside his brother in Mela which was also a box office bomb. Director Dharmesh Darshan did however praise Faisal's performance in the film.

Faisal went on to appear in a few B-grade films that fared poorly at the box office. From 2003 to 2004, he appeared in the TV serial Aandhi. After appearing in the 2005 film Chand Bujh Gaya, he went on a decade long hiatus.

In 2015, it was announced that he would be making his comeback and star in the film Chinar Daastaan-E-Ishq, a film produced by Rajesh Jain. In 2017, he starred in Danger, a horror film directed by Faisal Saif. The film remains unreleased.

In 2021, he made his directorial debut and starred in the psychological thriller film Faactory as well as singing a song for the film. In 2022, he made his debut in Kannada films with Oppanda.

== Personal life ==
In 2007, Khan was reported missing for two days. He had filed a report to the police several days earlier accusing his brother Aamir of keeping him confined in his home because Aamir thought that Faisal was mentally ill. He was eventually traced to Pune and brought back to Mumbai where he went through a medical examination. His brother Aamir and their father were in a custody battle over Faisal that garnered much press coverage. Faisal's custody was awarded to his father, Tahir.

== Filmography ==
Year	Title	Role	Notes
1969	Pyar Ka Mausam	Young Sunder	
1988	Qayamat Se Qayamat Tak	Member of Baba's gang	
1992	Jo Jeeta Wohi Sikandar	College Student	Uncredited
1994	Madhosh	Suraj	
2000	Mela	Shankar Shane	
2002	Kaaboo	Raja	
2002	Dushmani		Unreleased
2003	Border Hindustan Ka	Raj	
2003	Basti	Satish Kulkarni	
2003–2004	Aandhi	Siddharth	TV series
2005	Chand Bujh Gaya	Rahul Mehta	
2015	Chinar Daastaan-E-Ishq	Jamaal	
2017	Danger		Unreleased; also director
2021	Faactory	Yash Kadam	Also director and playback singer
2022	Oppanda		Kannada film
