= Prem Yog =

Prem Yog प्रेम योग
- Directed by: Rajeev Kumar
- Written by: Honey Irani; Rumi Jaffery
- Produced by: B. S. Shaad
- Starring: Shammi Kapoor; Rishi Kapoor; Madhoo; Prem Chopra
- Music by: Bappi Lahiri
- Release date: 9 September 1994
- Running time: 147 min
- Country: India
- Language: Hindi

Prem Yog is a 1994 Indian Hindi-language romantic comedy film starring Rishi Kapoor and Madhoo. This movie is heavily inspired by the Eddie Murphy and Arsenio Hall-starrer Coming To America.

== Cast ==
- Shammi Kapoor as Maharaj Chhatrapal Singh
- Rishi Kapoor as Yuvraj / Raju
- Madhoo as Anita Sethi
- Shakti Kapoor as Gulshan
- Johnny Lever as Raghu Qureshi
- Tinnu Anand as Ganpat
- Raza Murad as Yusuf
- Prem Chopra as Sethi
- Mohnish Behl as Jimmy Narang
- Tej Sapru as Narang
- Gufi Paintal as Hotel Waiter
- Kunika in song

== Plot ==
The story deals with Maharaj Chhatrapal Singh (Shammi Kapoor) and his wife the Maharani, who are delighted when they become proud parents of a son - the heir to the throne of Ramgarh. Their delight is short-lived when the Palace Astrologer predicts that Chhatrapal will be the last of the Maharajas for Ramgarh, and no throne is destined for his son, Raju (Rishi Kapoor). Perturbed at this news, Chhatrapal decides to protect Raju from the world and makes him lead a secluded life within the four walls of the palace and its surrounding grounds. Years later, Raju has grown up and his father has arranged his marriage with a young woman of noble parentage. Raju is unhappy with this decision, and decides to run away with his bodyguard, Gulshan (Shakti Kapoor). They end up in Bombay city, where Raju starts to work as a waiter in a restaurant. He meets with and falls in love with a dancer and singer, Anita Sethi (Madhoo), who is the daughter of a wealthy man. Her father would like her to marry Jimmy Narang (Mohnish Behl), son of the wealthy Mr. Narang, but Anita too falls in love with Raju. When Jimmy finds out that Raju is an heir-apparent to Ramgarh's throne, he tells Anita, who is angry with Raju for suppressing this information from her. Narang also informs Chhatrapal, who sets off with an army, to bring Raju back to marry the woman he has chosen for him. Raju now has to make a choice - stay and be captured by his father's men; or run away elsewhere.

== Music ==
1. "Zindagi Char Din Ki Na Rutho Sanam" - Babul Supriyo, Anuradha Paudwal
2. "Ye Dil Me Rehne Wale Dil Se Nahi Nikalte" (Duet) - Kumar Sanu, Anuradha Paudwal
3. "Socho Socho" - Anuradha Paudwal, Abhijeet
4. "Jane Kya Hua Dil Me" - Vinod Rathod, Sadhana Sargam
5. "Chhodo Nasha" - Hema Sardesai, Anuradha Paudwal
6. "Kora Dil Hai" - Vinod Rathod, Anuradha Paudwal, Ila Arun, Aroon Bakshi
7. "Lokan Akhya" - Aroon Bakshi
8. "Nazro Me Aisi Basi" - Abhijeet, Hema Sardesai ( Not in the film)
9. "Ye Dil Me Rehne Wale Dil Se Nahi Nikalte" (Male) - Kumar Sanu (not used in the film)
