= Anamika (1973 film) =

1973 Indian film by Raghunath Jalani

- Poster
- Directed by: Raghunath Jhalani
- Written by: Madan Joshi (dialogues)
- Screenplay by: Shashi Bhushan
- Story by: Surendra Prakash
- Produced by: Tahir Hussain
- Starring: Sanjeev Kumar; Jaya Bhaduri; Helen
- Cinematography: Munir Khan
- Edited by: Babu Lavande; Gurudutt Shirali
- Music by: R. D. Burman
- Release date: 18 May 1973
- Country: India
- Language: Hindi

Anamika is a 1973 Indian Hindi-language romantic thriller film directed by Raghunath Jalani, and starring Sanjeev Kumar with Jaya Bhaduri. The film was remade in Telugu in 1977 as Kalpana.

== Plot ==
Devendra Dutt, also known as Deven, is a famous author and a raging misogynist, who portrays women as untrustworthy in all his novels, and lives with his uncle, Shiv Prasad, and young niece, Dolly in Mumbai. One night, while returning home from a felicitation ceremony, Deven and Shiv Prasad witness a young girl being thrown out of a moving car and falling unconscious on the road. Deven grows suspicious and decides to approach the police, but Shiv Prasad insists that they take her home and give her medical attention, to which Deven unwillingly agrees. The next morning, the young girl regains consciousness, but cannot remember anything from the past, not even her name - shockingly except that she is Deven's wife, "Mrs. Devendra Dutt". Everyone tries to convince her otherwise, but she firmly insists that she is in her own home and married to Deven. As a result, Deven's doctor, Dr. Irshad Hussain, diagnoses her with both amnesia and wish fulfillment, since hundreds of young girls write fan mails to Deven, proposing him for marriage and even talking about how they are related to him since births.

Deven and Shiv Prasad post an advertisement for the young girl in the newspaper, but receive no response. Seeing her fragile state, Shiv Prasad, Dr. Irshad and the police decide to allow her to stay until someone arrives for her. Deven is against this decision and believes that the young girl is just trying to dupe them for some money, but names her "Anamika" (meaning "a nameless woman"). Soon, Anamika takes control of Deven's house and Dolly becomes her close friend and confidante. However, Deven hates Anamika and always keeps her at a distance, causing Dr. Irshad to advise him that his harshness could bring Anamika further mental trauma, but it turns out to be a ruse by him and Shiv Prasad in order to make Deven get rid of his attitude. Despite his initial hatred towards women, Deven gradually mellows down and grows close to Anamika, secretly wishing she would stay at his house forever and even refusing to hand her over to the police.

Shortly, things take a turn when Naresh, the son of Deven's paralysed publisher, Daulat Ram, arrives to hand over the copies of Deven's latest novel, Anamika, and also a royalty cheque. He mysteriously identifies Anamika, about whom he has an unpleasant memory, but keeps the truth a secret from Deven, while Anamika shows no identification to Naresh. That night, Naresh sends his henchmen to kidnap Anamika, but Deven intervenes on time and saves Anamika from them, causing Naresh's henchmen to escape. On Shiv Prasad's suggestion, Deven takes Anamika on a holiday to Shimla in order to help her in her fragile recovery. There, Deven is surprised to discover Anamika's photograph in a studio, and tracks the hotel of which the address is in its register. On further enquiry about the photograph at the hotel, the receptionist of it remembers Anamika as "Mrs. Kanchan Malhotra", the wife of a businessman named Ganga Prasad Malhotra. Though heartbroken by the realisation that Anamika is already married, Deven obtains Malhotra's address from the receptionist and cuts the trip to Shimla short. On returning to Mumbai with Anamika, Deven meets Malhotra at his office, only to learn from him that Kanchan is actually not his wife, but his employee who had accompanied him on his holiday to Shimla the previous year. On Malhotra's advice, Deven proceeds to meet an attractive cabaret dancer named Rubai, who informs him that Kanchan is a prostitute who used to work for her. Deven, already being supposedly deceived by a girl named Sapna four years prior, feels conned and believes that Anamika, like all other girls, is immoral and after his money. As a result, a disturbed and anguished Deven banishes Anamika from his house and even refuses to hear her side, disappointing both Shiv Prasad and Dolly.

After leaving from Deven's house, Anamika is promptly kidnapped and imprisoned at an isolated house in Delhi by Naresh's henchmen. At this point, Anamika's real name is revealed to be "Archana", and Naresh forces her to hand him over back all his property, which his own father had transferred into her name before dying from paralysis. Although Archana signs the documents, Naresh's property lawyer, Advocate Mehra, refuses to betray Daulat Ram and begins a scuffle with Naresh, which results in a big house fire. Mehra burns the property documents in it and escapes with Archana, while Naresh is trapped behind in the fire. Meanwhile, Shiv Prasad, who still has faith in Anamika, shows Deven a newspaper article about her, where she is identified by her true identity as Archana, who is receiving an award for philanthropy on behalf of her late mother, Saraswati Devi, from an institute in Delhi. An unconvinced Deven reluctantly travels to Delhi to investigate the truth about Anamika, but is unable to receive any information from the institute. However, he is fortunate to meet Anamika again at the silver jubilee celebration of his publishers in Delhi. Unfortunately, she refuses to identify Deven this time and is now introduced to him as "Mrs. Kashyap", the new owner of the publishing firm. A perplexed Deven follows Anamika to her house in Delhi and confronts her over her multiple identities, pleading with her to confess the truth about herself. Here, Anamika accuses him of distrusting all women over a heartbreak, but finally narrates her ill-fated past to Deven in a flashback.

An ardent fan of Deven's novels, Archana was infatuated with him since college. However, incessantly pursued by her classmate, Naresh, and helpless by her poverty, which was worsened when her mother was diagnosed with cancer, she agreed for an arranged marriage. On her marriage night, Archana discovered that she was married to Naresh's older brother, who deserted her the same night, believing himself undeserving of Archana. Naresh exploited his brother's absence and continued to harass Archana, whose husband ended up committing suicide. Unable to bear the shock, Daulat Ram became paralysed and handed over all his property to Archana, as Naresh was always imperfect for that responsibility. Meanwhile, Archana's mother finally succumbed to her terminal illness and died, and Naresh tried to rape the grieving Archana one night. As a result, Archana escaped from Naresh's house and met Rubai, with whose help she joined Malhotra's modeling company by the name of Kanchan in order to start afresh. On a holiday to Shimla with Malhotra, where they both checked into the hotel as a couple, Malhotra tried to take advantage of Archana, and when she resisted, he blamed her for the incident. After Archana quit her job for Malhotra, Rubai outwardly sympathised with her and allowed her to stay in what she claimed was the hostel of working girls.

A few days later, Archana got arrested with the rest of the girls at the hostel in a police raid, which is when she realised that she had been staying at a brothel. However, she was eventually acquitted by the police, based on the testimony of the other inmates and her own testimony against Rubai in the court. Rubai tried to seek revenge from Archana for this and sent her henchmen to murder her. While Rubai's henchmen were kidnapping her, Archana jumped out of their moving car and fell unconscious on the street the night Deven and Shiv Prasad found her. When she regained consciousness and discovered that she was at her favourite author's house, Archana felt as if fate had suddenly smiled on her and decided to stay, come what may, causing her to act of being Deven's wife. In the present, Anamika admits to Deven that she has no evidence to prove everything she has revealed about herself. However, seeing her tear-filled eyes, Deven believes her and empathises with her, pleading forgiveness and reconciling with Anamika. Just then, a severely burnt Naresh, who had survived the house fire, barges into the house and attacks them both, in an attempt to rape and murder Anamika. After a prolonged cat-and-mouse pursuit in a darkened house, Naresh gets electrocuted to death in self-defence, and Deven and Anamika are finally united.

== Cast ==
- Sanjeev Kumar as Devendra Dutt (Deven)
- Jaya Bhaduri as "Anamika" / Archana / Mrs. Devendra Dutt / Kanchan / Mrs. Kashyap
- Rajesh Behl as Naresh Kashyap
- A. K. Hangal as Shiv Prasad (Deven's uncle)
- Iftekhar as Dr. Irshad Hussain (Deven's doctor)
- Helen as Rubai (cabaret dancer)
- Baby Pinky as Dolly (Deven's niece)
- Shivraj as Daulat Ram Kashyap (Naresh's father)
- Achala Sachdev as Archana's mother (special appearance)
- Narendra Nath as Ganga Prasad Malhotra (special appearance)
- Asrani as Hanuman Singh (Deven's secretary)
- Ashoo as the nurse
- Meena T. as Bijli
- Yunus Parvez as Ram Lakhan
- Raja Duggal as photoshop owner
- Siraj Syed as college student secretary

== Music ==
- The song "Meri Bheegi Bheegi Si" was listed at #4 on Binaca Geetmala annual list 1973. It was the official Hindi remake of Mone Pore Ruby Roy
- The song "Bahon Mein Chale Aao" was listed at #36 on Binaca Geetmala annual list 1973

The musical instrument duggi was played by Homi Mullan for the song "Bahaon Mein Chale Aao".

All lyrics are written by Majrooh Sultanpuri; all music is composed by Rahul Dev Burman.

Songs
No.	Title	Singer	Length
1.	"Meri Bheegi Bheegi Si" (Raga Kirwani)	Kishore Kumar	4:05
2.	"Aaj Ki Raat Koi Aane Ko Hai"	Asha Bhosle	6:03
3.	"Jaaun To Kahan Jaaun"	Asha Bhosle	3:32
4.	"Logon Na Maaro Ise"	Asha Bhosle	4:33
5.	"Baahon Mein Chale Aao"	Lata Mangeshkar	4:01
