= Phir Janam Lenge Hum =

Phir Janam Lenge Hum/Janam Janam Na Saathi
- Directed by: Mehul Kumar
- Music by: Bappi Lahiri
- Release date: 1977
- Country: India
- Language: Hindi-Gujarati

Phir Janam Lenge Hum/Janam Janam Na Saathi is a bilingual Hindi-Gujarati film directed by Mehul Kumar. It was debut film of the director.

== Cast ==
- Adil Amaan
- Bhavana Bhatt
- Ramesh Deo (as Ramesh Dev)
- Dhaval
- Gayatri
- Tahir Hussain
- Iftekhar
- Jagdeep
- Roopesh Kumar
- Raksha Trivedi

== Soundtrack ==
The music of the film was composed by Bappi Lahiri, while lyrics were written by Gauhar Kanpuri.

1. "Phir Janam Lenge Hum (Happy)" - Kishore Kumar, Lata Mangeshkar
2. "Phir Janam Lenge Hum (Sad)" - Kishore Kumar, Lata Mangeshkar
