= Anmol Malik =

Indian author and singer (born 1990)

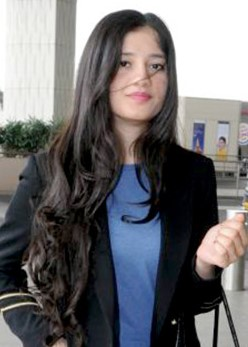
- Born: 5 February 1990 (age 36); Mumbai, Maharashtra, India
- Education: BSc (Hons) Computer Science and Business; Literature; Film
- Alma mater: University of Warwick, England; Ecole Mondiale World School Mumbai; Dhirubhai Ambani International School Mumbai
- Occupations: Author, singer, lyricist, composer
- Years active: 1995–present
- Parent: Anu Malik

Anmol Malik (born 5 February 1990) is an Indian author, singer, lyricist and composer who works in the Bollywood music industry. She is the daughter of singer Anu Malik.

== Career ==
=== Early career ===
After graduating from the University of Warwick, Malik returned to India and worked in the Creative Development department at Disney UTV. Following a stint as an assistant director with Rohan Sippy, Malik went on to become a junior copywriter with Leo Burnett Worldwide in India and worked on the Tide (brand) campaign for the South Asian market. She eventually became Head of the Script Department at Yash Raj Films and worked on films such as Mardaani and Dum Laga Ke Haisha.

=== Author ===
In 2020, Malik made her debut as an author with the book Three Impossible Wishes published by HarperCollins. A young-adult romantic comedy, the book was praised by actor Ayushmann Khurrana for being "Totally cheeky, completely hilarious and endlessly charming." According to a positive review by Scroll.In, the book is "A breezy campus romance that is a reminder of a life that college students are missing in the lockdown."

Her books were felicitated at the House of Lords, United Kingdom by Lord Rami Ranger, Baron of Mayfair.

Under her pen name she has written several pieces of micro-fiction for Terribly Tiny Tales, a popular storytelling platform with over 12 million readers. In 2019, she was invited to write two pieces of short fiction for their third book titled With Love released by Penguin Books.

After making it to the Amazon Best Reads list Malik was chosen to write for the Amazon Kindle platform where she produced the pieces titled Audrey & Adam and Things You Learn in a Different City.

For Bound India's Jotted platform, Malik wrote The Visitor, an excerpt from a longer piece of work that has piqued the interest of fans. She was also a guest on their podcast Books And Beyond for the episode "Writing Genre-Bending Romantic Comedies".

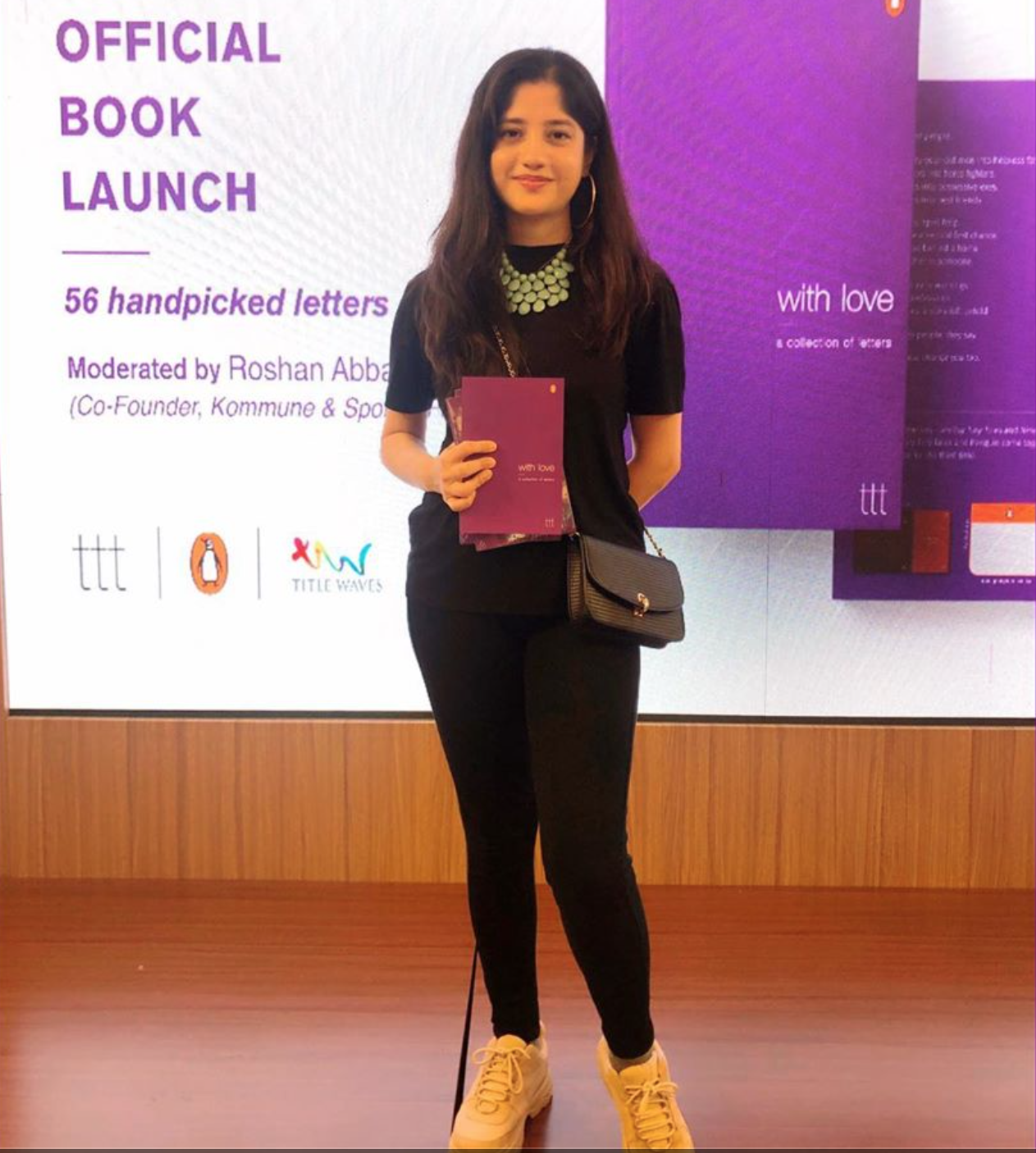
Malik at her Terribly Tiny Tales book launch

She has also written for several publications including Harper's Bazaar Alone Together, Mansworld, In Defence Of 'I'm Too Busy' and Elle India

In November, she was invited to speak at the Chandigarh Literature Festival for a session titled Impossible Secrets: Coming of Age Stories For Young Adults.

==== Bibliography ====
Publisher	Title	Role	Note
Terribly Tiny Tales/ Penguin Books	Dear John	Author	
Terribly Tiny Tales/ Penguin Books	To The Boy on the Last Bench	Author	
HarperCollins	Three Impossible Wishes	Author	Book
Amazon Kindle	Audrey & Adam	Author	
Amazon Kindle	Things You Learn in a Different City	Author	
Harper's Bazaar/ Contributing Author	Alone Together	Author	
Man's World	In Defence of I'm Too Busy	Author	
Bound India's Jotted	The Visitor	Author	
Hindustan Times HT Brunch	Let It Be	Author	
HarperCollins	A Plane Story	Author	Book

=== Singer ===
Malik began her singing career by lending her voice for the movie Biwi No.1. She went on to record her first vocal track at the age of five. This was followed by other movies where Malik sang as a child artist, such as Mela and Badal.

In the year 2006, director J. P. Dutta cast her as the singer for lead actress Aishwariya Rai in the movie Umrao Jaan. Her next release was the song "Chal Mera Hath Pakad Le" from the Satish Kaushik movie Teree Sang. During the film's pre-release the song gained popularity after Malik's impromptu live performance on the music reality show Indian Idol.

At the age of 16, Malik sang "Talli" from the movie Ugly Aur Pagli, a fusion of grunge and rap music. The song debuted at the No.1 position and remained the top dance song for that year.

Malik's discography includes various popular songs such as "Suno Suno" from Gali Gali Chor Hai, "Big Fat Indian Wedding" from the movie Yeh Jo Mohabbat Hai, "Ek Mulaqat" from the movie Sonali Cable. She also sang the Western Version of "Old School Girl" from the movie Tanu Weds Manu: Returns in 2015. Recently Malik sang "Time Lagaya Kaiko" in Welcome Back.

In October 2015, her first indie single as a singer, "Lamhein", an official adaptation of Coldplay's "Paradise", was released under EMI Records India. The music was recreated by her father, Anu Malik, and the lyrics were written by Manoj Muntashir. A music video, directed by Mohit Suri, featured Malik and Mohit Marwah.

Malik launched her first English single "Let Me Come Home" in February 2017; the song is written, composed and sung by her. Malik put the song on YouTube first, where it grabbed the attention of the programming execs at VH1.

She was one of the composers for the 2017 Hindi-language Indu Sarkar.

In 2021, she was chosen to sing Chura Ke Dil Mera 2.0 from the movie Hungama 2. It became the highest ranked dance track of the year.

=== Songwriter ===
After her graduation from university, Malik released the English single "The Graduation". The song was only released online.

== Discography ==
Year	Movie	Song(s)	Music director(s)
1996	Diljale	(Child Artist)	Anu Malik
1998	Chhota Chetan	Jo Tum Kaho (Child Artist)	Anu Malik
1999	Biwi No.1	Mujhe Maaf Karna (Child Artist)	Anu Malik
2000	Mela	Mela Dilon Ka (Celebration), (Child Artist)	Anu Malik
2006	Umrao Jaan	Agle Janam Mohe Bitiya Na Kijo	Anu Malik
2008	Ugly Aur Pagli	Talli, Shut Up, Aa Nachle	Anu Malik
2009	Teree Sang	Chal Mera Hath Pakad Le	Anu Malik
2010	Pyaar Impossible!	10 on 10	Salim–Sulaiman
2012	Gali Gali Chor Hai	Suno Suno	Anu Malik
2012	Yeh Jo Mohabbat Hai	Big Fat Indian Wedding	Anu Malik
2013	Bajatey Raho	Naagin Dance	Jaidev Kumar
2014	Sonali Cable	Gannu Rocks, Ek Mulaqat	Mikey McCleary, Jubin Nautiyal
2015	Tanu Weds Manu: Returns	Old School Girl (Western Version)	Krsna Solo
2015	Welcome Back	Time Lagaya Kaiko	Anu Malik
2015	Lamhein	Music Video	Anu Malik
2016	Housefull 3	Pyar Ki	Shaarib-Toshi
2017	Let Me Come Home	Let Me Come Home	Anmol Malik
2017	Bhabi Ji Ghar Par Hain!	Music Video	Anmol Malik
2017	Begum Jaan	"Holi Khelein"	Anu Malik
2018	Jiya Na Jaye	"Music Video"	Anmol Malik
2018	Tum Hi Toh Ho	"Music Video"	Anu Malik
2019	Alvida Phir Kyun Kaha	"Song"	Anu Malik
2021	Hungama 2	"Chura Ke Dil Mera 2.0"	Benny Dayal
2021	Hungama 2	"Hungama Ho Gaya"	Mika Singh
2024	Silsila Ye	"Silsila Ye"	Anmol Malik, Kartik Sachdeva
2024	Aisi Toh Baat	"Aisi Toh Baat"	Anmol Malik
