= Chand Bujh Gaya =

- DVD cover of the film
- Directed by: Sharique Minhaj
- Written by: Zuben Dr.; Qamruddin Falak
- Produced by: Faaiz Anwar
- Starring: Faisal Khan; Shama Sikander; Pratap Singh
- Cinematography: Taposh Mandal
- Edited by: Ranjan Suryawanshi
- Music by: Ghulam Ali; Ghani; Kanak Raj
- Production company: F.A. Picture International
- Release date: 18 March 2005
- Running time: 116 minutes
- Country: India
- Language: Hindi
- Budget: ₹1.75 crore
- Box office: est. ₹15.5 lakh

Chand Bujh Gaya (English: The Moon Is Eclipsed) is a 2005 Indian Hindi-language drama thriller film directed by Sharique Minhaj in his directorial debut and featuring Faisal Khan and Shama Sikander in leading roles. The film is set against the backdrop of the 2002 Godhra train burning. Both the Central Board of Film Certification (CBFC) and its appellate authority, the Film Certificate Appellate Tribunal (FCAT) refused to grant a certificate to the film. The film was released only after the Bombay High Court quashed the decisions of CBFC and FCAT.

== Plot ==
Tusshar Mehta, a businessman, has arranged the marriage of his son Rahul to Meghna. However, Rahul is in love with Saveen, and Meghna steps away from the marriage when she learns of their love. Rahul and Saveen board the Sabarmati Express to meet her father Imran Jafri who lives in Ahmedabad. Before the couple reach their destination, the train is set on fire by a mob near Godhra Junction railway station. Escaping from the mob, they take refuge at the house of Payal, a journalist. The train burning sparks a communal riot. Differences emerge between Rahul and Saveen while they try to protect themselves from the riot, eventually succumbing to it.

== Cast ==
- Faisal Khan as Rahul T. Mehta
- Shama Sikander as Saveen I. Jafri
- Pratap Singh as Chief Minister of Gujarat, based on Narendra Modi
- Faraaz Khan as Adarsh
- Sanam as Payal
- Aliza as Meghna
- Ishrat Ali as Imran Jafri
- Mukesh Ahuja as Editor
- Shabnam Kapoor as Namrata
- Raja Kapse as Anil Sharma
- Neha Bam as Asha Sharma
- Usman Raza as Tusshar Mehta
- Kamya Panjabi as Dancer (special appearance)
- Farzan Qureshi
- Saima Qureshi
- Baby Farhat Qureshi
- Shameem Khan in special appearance

== Production ==
Film writer and lyricist Faaiz Anwar co-produced the film, made in five months and with a budget of Rs. 1.75 crores. He stated that the story was "truth ... gathered through numerous newspapers". The film was the directorial debut of Sharique Minhaj, who was working as an equipment supplier for a television channel during the 2002 Gujarat riots.

Chand Bujh Gaya marked the first collaboration between Faisal Khan and Minhaj. They would later come together for Chinar Daastaan-E-Ishq (2015). Mahesh Bhatt had warned Anwar, stating: "you have put your hands in dynamite, not fire". The character based on Narendra Modi, Chief Minister of Gujarat, was played by Pratap Singh, who was subsequently offered the same role in a television serial, which he declined. In a 2007 interview, Anwar called the film "an attempt to bring about a sense of understanding between Hindus and Muslims".

Some scenes of the film were shot in Silvassa, the capital of the then union territory of Dadra and Nagar Haveli.

== Certification controversy ==
The producers had applied for a censor certificate in September 2003. The Examination Committee of the Central Board of Film Certification (CBFC) initially refused to certify the film, fearing that certain visuals and dialogues in the film may have the "danger of inciting communal violence". Upon discussion with the committee, the filmmakers removed certain scenes, reducing the footage to 10,966 feet (3,342 m) from 11,602 feet (3,536 m). Despite the cuts, the committee refused to certify the film, citing that "the Gujarat violence is a live issue and a scar on national sensitivity. Exhibition of the film will certainly aggravate the situation". One key objection made by the board was the likeness between the film's villain and Modi. The CBFC had also denied certificates to two documentaries based on the 2002 Gujarat riots: Rakesh Sharma's Final Solution and Rakesh Pimple's Aakrosh. The producers expressed their inability to make any further cuts to the film as that would "dilute the message of communal harmony" the film intended to portray. To this, the CBFC, in January 2004, finally refused to grant certification to the film in its existing form.

The producers filed an appeal against the CBFC's decision before the Film Certificate Appellate Tribunal (FCAT) in April 2004; FCAT found the CBFC's decision correct and affirmed that the depiction of explicit violence and resemblance of its characters to real-life people could ignite communal violence and "public disharmony". Rakesh Sinha, a Tribunal member, stated: "There seems to be a sort of ideological prejudice in the making of the film"; he felt that it gave the impression that the "Chief Minister [was] engineering the riots". The producers refused to cast another actor for the role of the Chief Minister.

The filmmakers petitioned the Bombay High Court against the decisions of CBFC and FCAT as encroachment on the right to free speech and expression. A two-member bench comprising Chief Justice Dalveer Bhandari and Justice Dhananjaya Y. Chandrachud viewed the film and reached the conclusion that the "theme of the film is the absolute insensibility of violence. The film does not extol violence nor does it condemn any community as having taking recourse to violence". In F.A. Picture International v. CBFC AIR 2005 Bom 145, the bench observed that CBFC's and FCAT's refusal to grant a certificate to the film was a "clear infringement of the fundamental right of the producer under Article 19(1)(a) of the Constitution", and said they had "misconceived the scope and function of their powers and jurisdiction". The bench in its judgment dated 5 November 2004 directed the CBFC to grant appropriate certification to the film.

== Release ==
Chand Bujh Gaya was released on 18 March 2005 with a U certificate, implying unrestricted public exhibition. However, the Chief Minister of Gujarat, Narendra Modi, banned the film within Gujarat.

== Soundtrack ==
Track listing
No.	Title	Lyrics	Music	Performer(s)	Length
1.	"Yaad Aye Woh Din, Jaane Kyon Tere Bin"	Faaiz Anwar	Kanak Raj	Hariharan
2.	"Chupke Chupke De Jaati Hai Pyar Ka Paigham Teri Aankhen"	Faaiz Anwar	Ghani	Kumar Sanu, Pamela Jain
3.	"Rehta Nahin Hai Chand Kabhi Chandni Se Dur"	Faaiz Anwar	Ghulam Ali	Kavita Krishnamurti
4.	"Chand Bujh Gaya"	Faaiz Anwar	Kanak Raj	Kumar Sanu
5.	"Tujhey Zindagi Ki Tarah"	Faaiz Anwar	Kanak Raj	Preetha Mazumdar
6.	"Yeh Apna Hindustan"	Faaiz Anwar	Kanak Raj	Kinnari
7.	"Julf Meri Laheraai Re"	Faaiz Anwar	Kanak Raj	Vaishali Samant

In its review of the film's soundtrack album, The Hindu noted that the title song "[caused] discomfort" but was appreciative of the three songs: "Chupke Chupke De Jaati Hai Pyaar Ka Paigaam Teri Yaadein", "Rehta Nahin Hai Chand Kabhi Chandni Se Dur", and "Zulf Meri Lehrai Re", calling them "pretty soft and romantic". It opined that from a child's perspective, the song "Yeh Apna Hindustan" "[did] sound good" and "Yaad Aaye woh Din" was a "mood melody".

== Reception ==
Upon its release, Chand Bujh Gaya performed poorly at the box office. According to Box Office India, the film had a worldwide first-week collection of ₹10.00 lakh (US$10,000) and a worldwide gross of approximately ₹15.52 lakh (US$16,000).
