= Trimurti (1995 film) =

- Hindi-language Film poster
- Directed by: Mukul Anand
- Written by: Karan Razdan
- Produced by: Subhash Ghai
- Starring: Jackie Shroff; Anil Kapoor; Shah Rukh Khan; Anjali Jathar; Priya Tendulkar; Gautami; Mohan Agashe; Saeed Jaffrey; Himani Shivpuri
- Cinematography: Ashok Mehta; Rajiv Jain
- Music by: Songs: Laxmikant–Pyarelal; Score: Koti
- Production company: Mukta Arts
- Distributed by: Zee Entertainment Enterprises
- Release date: 22 December 1995
- Running time: 181 minutes.
- Country: India
- Language: Hindi
- Budget: ₹11 crore (equivalent to ₹72 crore or US$7.4 million in 2026)

Trimurti (transl. Trinity) is a 1995 Indian Hindi-language action drama film directed by Mukul S. Anand, starring Jackie Shroff, Anil Kapoor, Shah Rukh Khan, Anjali Jathar and Priya Tendulkar. Trimurti was the maiden production venture of Subhash Ghai’s Mukta Arts. It was the last completed film for director Mukul S. Anand, who died while filming Dus in 1997. It earned a record opening weekend of around ₹3.07 crore (equivalent to ₹20 crore or US$2.1 million in 2026) net, and becoming the "first film to record a ₹1 crore (equivalent to ₹6.5 crore or US$680,000 in 2026) net opening day."

== Plot ==
In 1977, the notorious Khokha Singh (Mohan Agashe) entraps dedicated police inspector Satyadevi Singh (Priya Tendulkar). She has three children Shakti (Jackie Shroff), Anand (Anil Kapoor) and Romi (Shah Rukh Khan), the last of whom was born while she was in jail. They are her Trimurti, who she hopes will assist her in avenging her humiliation. What she doesn't know is that Anand and Shakti had a fight when they were kids. Anand has left the house, started working for Peter (One of the Khokha's blackmarket businessman) and is presumed dead.

After 18 years, in 1995, Shakti and Romi live together and believe their mother is dead. Their uncle tells them she is hoping that the brothers will once again become their mother's Trimurti. Shakti works for the military. Romi is in love with a girl named Radha, who belongs to an economically higher-class. They love each other so much that they decide to end their lives when they cannot get married. After pleading with his brother and almost consuming poison, Romi takes Shakti to Radha's house to ask for her hand, but Shakti is humiliated.

Romi runs away from home and becomes successful. He starts working for Khokha without knowing the issues between them. Romi meets Sikander, a rich man working in the black market; he feels sympathy for Romi because he is a romantic at heart. He helps Romi become rich.

Sikander goes to Romi's village after hearing some religious music from there. He sees a picture of his mother — who is Shakti and Romi's mother. He slowly tries to rekindle his relationship with Shakti, but once again they have a fight and Shakti learns that he is Anand.

After 18 long years, Satyadevi is released from jail due to good behavior. She learns from her brother, Bhanu, that all is not well with her sons. Shakti is an emotional wreck; Anand aka Sikander and Romi are working for Khokha, who has assigned him the task of abducting and killing Satyadevi. In the end, after a lot of hardship, the three brothers come together, kill Khokha Singh, and save their mother.

== Cast ==
- Anil Kapoor as Anand Singh / Sikander
- Jackie Shroff as Shakti Singh
- Shahrukh Khan as Bholey / Romi Singh
- Priya Tendulkar as Satyadevi Singh
- Gautami Tadimalla as Jyoti
- Anjali Jathar as Radha Chaudhary
- Tinnu Anand as Himmat Singh
- Saeed Jaffrey as Bhanuwala
- Anang Desai as Satyadevi’s husband
- Himani Shivpuri as Janki Singh
- Satyen Kappu as Sikander's mentor
- Mohan Agashe as Khokha Singh
- Anirudh Agarwal as Talaf
- Sunila Karambelkar as Item Dancer in the Song " Bikta Hai Sona"

== Production ==
The film began production in early 1994 with a release set for December 1994 and originally the three main lead roles were set to be played by Jackie Shroff, Sanjay Dutt and Shahrukh Khan. Sanjay Dutt had shot some scenes for the film before being sentenced to a prison term. To avoid any delays, producer Subhash Ghai decided to recast his role with Anil Kapoor. The film was eventually completed for release in December 1995.

== Music ==
The film score was composed by Koti while the songs were composed by Laxmikant Pyarelal, all lyrics written by Anand Bakshi.

Trimurti

Soundtrack album by Laxmikant Pyarelal
- Released: 1995
- Length: 56:22
- Language: Hindi

No.	Title	Singers	Length
1.	"Mujhe Pyaar Karo"	Vinod Rathod, Alka Yagnik & Manhar Udhas	7:25
2.	"Very Good Very Bad"	Udit Narayan & Vinod Rathod	06:23
3.	"E - Ri - Sakhi"	Kavita Krishnamurthy	5:08
4.	"Bol Bol Bol"	Ila Arun, Udit Narayan & Sudesh Bhosle	07:52
5.	"Mata Mata"	Vinod Rathod, Alka Yagnik	07:34
6.	"Sadiyan Saal"	Alka Yagnik, Udit Narayan	8:09
7.	"Mujhe Pyaar Karo"	Instrumental	7:20
8.	"Very Good Very Bad"	Instrumental	6:24
Total length:			56:22

== Box office ==
Trimurti grossed ₹14.24 crore (US$1.5 million) in India and $375,000 (₹1.32 crore) in other countries, for a worldwide total of ₹15.56 crore (US$1.6 million), against its ₹11 crore (US$1.1 million) budget. It had a worldwide opening weekend of ₹5.09 crore (US$530,000), and grossed ₹8.36 crore (US$870,000) in its first week.

=== India ===
It opened on Friday, 22 December 1995, across 310 screens, and took a record opening of ₹1.06 crore (US$110,000) net, becoming the first film to record ₹1 crore (US$100,000) net on opening day. It grossed ₹3.07 crore (US$320,000) in its opening weekend, and had a first week of ₹5.04 crore (US$520,000) and earned a total of ₹8.57 crore (US$890,000) net. It was declared a "Flop" by Box Office India. According to India Today, the film "sold at an awesome Rs 2 crore per territory. It disappeared by day three, incurring losses of over Rs 6 crore."

=== Overseas ===
It earned $375,000 (₹1.32 crore) outside India.
