= Soundaravalli =

- சௌந்தரவல்லி
- Genre: Soap opera
- Written by: Prabhu Nepal
- Screenplay by: Prabhu Nepal
- Directed by: Prabhu Nepal
- Starring: Madhoo; Maheswari; Sudha Chandran; Ajay Rathnam; Manokar
- Opening theme: "Ayiram Padaippukku Anaval Neeye"; Manikka Vinayagam; Malathy Lakshman (Vocal); R.K (Lyrics)
- Country of origin: India
- Original language: Tamil
- No. of seasons: 1
- No. of episodes: 97

Production
- Producer: Prabhu Nepal
- Camera setup: Multi-camera
- Running time: approx. 20-22 minutes per episode
- Production company: Jakaarb Telefilms

Original release
- Network: Jaya TV
- Release: 2010 – 13 January 2011

Soundaravalli (Tamil: சௌந்தரவல்லி) is an Indian Tamil-language soap opera that aired Monday through Thursday on Jaya TV from 2010 to 13 January 2011 at 8:00PM IST for 97 episodes. The show starred Madhoo, Maheswari, Sudha Chandran, Ajay Rathnam and Manokar among others. It was produced, screenplay and director by Prabhu Nepal. The serial was also aired in Singapore national TV Mediacorp Vasantham Mondays - Friday 8pm.

== Cast ==
=== Main cast ===
- Madhoo as Soundaravalli
  - a character from the Devadasi community.
- Maheswari
- Sudha Chandran as Akilandeshwari
  - She has a lot of prejudices and tries to oppose Soundaravalli at every turn, but the latter's character is a woman who has been strengthened by personal experiences, and is willing to fight her every step of the way.

=== Additional cast ===
- Ajay Rathnam
- Manokar
- Mohan Vaithya
- Srikala
- Jayalakshmi
- G.K
- Rajkumar
- Sailaya
- Jeya Rekha
- Sridhar
- Kobi
- Durga
- Lalitha Maayi
- Abilash
- Sachin

== Title song ==
=== Soundtrack ===
Tracklist
No.	Title	Lyrics	Singer(s)	Length
1.	"Ayiram Padaippukku Anaval Neeye(ஆயிரம் படைப்புக்கு ஆனவள் நீயே)"	Manikka Vinayagam; Malathy Lakshman	R.K	3:30
