= Mone Pore Ruby Roy =

1969 song by R. D. Burman

- Cover art of the song including R.D. Burman and Asha Bhosle

Song by R. D. Burman
- Language: Bengali
- English title: Remembering Ruby Roy
- Written: Late 1960s
- Released: 1969
- Length: 3:27
- Label: Saregama India Ltd.
- Composer: R. D. Burman
- Lyricist: Sachin Bhowmick

"Mone Pore Ruby Roy"
A 26-second sample of the song.

"Mone Pore Ruby Roy" is an Indian Bengali-language song sung by Rahul Dev Burman in 1969. The lyrics of this song were written by Sachin Bhowmick in the late 1960s as a throwback to his college days. It was added to the album 'Nostalgic Puja Hits' in 2017 by its record label company Saregama India ltd. "Mone Pore Ruby Roy" was remade in Hindi under the name of "Meri Bheegi Bheegi Si", sung by Kishore Kumar and featured in the Sanjeev Kumar-starrer 1973 film Anamika.

== Overview ==
Mone Pore Ruby Roy is one of Rahul Dev Burman's Bengali songs, which became an instant hit during the Durga Puja of 1969.

In the late 1960s, Sachin Bhowmick pledged to write the lyrics of a Bengali song that Rahul Dev Burman would sing. It was planned to be released in the Durga Puja festival. The lyrics were written by Bhowmick in the late 1960s, being postponed due to other screenplays like Brahmachari, Aya Sawan Jhoom Ke and Aradhana in 1968 and 1969. Rest of the song's details, such as the tune and rhythm were composed by Burman. It was a puja hit of 1969.

Considered to be the best-known Bengali song of Rahul Dev Burman, the story of the song Mone Pore Ruby Roy is that Sachin Bhowmick once loved a certain girl in college who he had affections for, he never was able have an attachment with. Her actual name was Chhobi Roy who is commemorated as "Ruby Roy" in the song to protect her identity. R.D. Burman was able to persuade Bhowmick for the lyrics.

After the widespread prevalence of Mone Pore Ruby Roy, Sachin Bhowmick was invited to many interviews. He was asked by many as what the inspiration of the song was, to which he replied that this song was made in memories of his own failed love, in which he was rejected. He did not want to make her name public, and changed it to 'Ruby Roy'. This is reflected in the song's lyrics.

== Remakes ==
In 1973, R.D. Burman got Kishore Kumar to sing the Hindi version of this song, named "Meri Bheegi Bheegi Si", written by Majrooh Sultanpuri. He used it in the film Anamika released in the same year, starring Sanjeev Kumar and Jaya Bhaduri.

In 2021, the remake song "Ruby Ray 3.0" was released by Ishan Mazumdar featuring Sayantani Guhathakurta. Many people helped in the making of this song. Namely, Ishan Mazumdar was the singer, composer and lyricist; Rahul Sarkar did the programming and arrangement; Subhasish Pathak did the mixing-mastering and the entire music video was directed by Gourav Dutta.
