= Dharmesh Darshan =

Indian film director (born 1967)

- Born: Dharmesh Sabharwal; 16 May 1967 (age 59); Mumbai, Maharashtra, India
- Occupations: Director, Producer, writer
- Years active: 1993–2006
- Family: Bhatt family
- Website: www.dharmeshdarshan.com

Dharmesh Darshan is an Indian filmmaker, film director and writer who works in Bollywood. He was born into the Bhatt family. He began his career as one of the youngest filmmakers of Indian cinema, in the league of Sooraj Barjatya, Aditya Chopra, Karan Johar, and Sanjay Leela Bhansali. He began his directorial career with the action romance Lootere (1993), starring Sunny Deol and Juhi Chawla, which was a big hit that gave him a huge breakthrough early in his career. He later created box-office history with the romantic drama Raja Hindustani (1996) starring Aamir Khan and Karisma Kapoor. He then directed the musical romantic drama Dhadkan (2000) starring Akshay Kumar, Suniel Shetty and Shilpa Shetty, another commercial success.

== Early life ==
Dharmesh was born Dharmesh Sabharwal, the son of film producer Darshan Sabharwal and his wife Sheila, who is the elder sister of filmmakers, Mahesh Bhatt and Mukesh Bhatt. Thus, both his parents were linked to the Hindi film industry. At some point, Dharmesh decided to adopt his father's first name as his own surname, and came to be known as Dharmesh Darshan.

== Career ==
=== Directorial debut and Success (1993-2000) ===
Dharmesh made his directorial and screenwriting debut with the action romance Lootere (1993), starring Sunny Deol and Juhi Chawla in lead roles. Produced by his brother, Suneel Darshan, the film emerged as a commercial success at the box office.

Dharmesh achieved his breakthrough with his next directorial venture, the romantic drama, Raja Hindustani (1996), starring Aamir Khan and Karisma Kapoor in lead roles. The film told the story of a cab driver (Khan) from a small town who falls in love with a rich young woman (Kapoor). It received positive reviews from critics upon release, with praise for its direction, story, screenplay, soundtrack, and performances of the cast. The film emerged as a major blockbuster at the box office, grossing ₹76.34 crore worldwide, ranking as the highest-grossing Hindi film of the year, and the fourth highest-grossing film in India of the 1990s. Raja Hindustani won several awards including the Filmfare Award for Best Film, and earned Dharmesh his first nomination for the Filmfare Award for Best Director.

Dharmesh began the new millennium with directing and screenwriting the masala film Mela and the musical romantic drama Dhadkan. Mela, which starred Khan, Twinkle Khanna and his real-life younger brother Faisal Khan in lead roles, was the first Bollywood release of the new millennium. The film opened to highly negative reviews from critics upon release, and emerged as a major commercial disaster at the box-office. Mela is considered to be one of the worst films of Hindi cinema.

Dharmesh's next directorial that year was Dhadkan, starring Akshay Kumar, Shilpa Shetty, Suniel Shetty, and Mahima Chaudhry in lead roles. Inspired by Emily Brontë's novel Wuthering Heights, the film received positive reviews from critics upon release, with praise for its direction, soundtrack, and performances of the cast. It emerged as a major commercial success at the box office, grossing ₹26 crore worldwide, ranking as the fourth highest-grossing Hindi film of the year. Dhadkan earned Dharmesh his second nomination for the Filmfare Award for Best Director.

=== Career decline (2001 onwards) ===
After doing three back-to-back successes—Lootere, Raja Hindustani and Dhadkan—and one forgettable film Mela, his next venture was the romance Haan Maine Bhi Pyaar Kiya (2002), starring Akshay Kumar, Karishma Kapoor and Abhishek Bachchan in lead roles. Inspired by T. Rama Rao's Hindi-language drama film Ek Hi Bhool (1981), the film received mixed-to-negative reviews from critics, and emerged as a commercial failure at the box office.

He next directed and screenwrote the romantic drama Bewafaa (2005) starring Akshay Kumar, Kareena Kapoor, Anil Kapoor and Sushmita Sen in lead roles. Inspired by B. R. Chopra's Gumrah (1963), the film received mixed reviews from critics upon release, and emerged as an average grosser at the domestic box office; however, it emerged as a commercial success in overseas markets.

His last directorial to date is the romantic comedy Aap Ki Khatir (2006) starring Akshaye Khanna and Priyanka Chopra in lead roles. Inspired by the 2005 American film, The Wedding Date (2005), the film received negative reviews from critics upon release, and emerged as a commercial disaster at the box office.

== Filmography ==
Year	Film	Role(s)
1993	Lootere	Director, writer
1996	Raja Hindustani	Director, writer
2000	Mela	Director, writer
2000	Dhadkan	Director, writer
2002	Haan Maine Bhi Pyaar Kiya	Director, writer
2005	Bewafaa	Director, writer
2006	Aap Ki Khatir	Director

== Awards and nominations ==
Year	Award	Category	Film	Result	Ref.
1997	Filmfare Awards	Best Director	Raja Hindustani	Nominated	
2001	Filmfare Awards	Best Director	Dhadkan	Nominated	
2001	IIFA Awards	Best Director	Dhadkan	Nominated	
2001	IIFA Awards	Best Story	Dhadkan	Nominated	
1997	Screen Awards	Best Director	Raja Hindustani	Won	
2001	Screen Awards	Best Director	Dhadkan	Nominated	
