= Madhosh (1994 film) =

- Directed by: Vikram Bhatt
- Written by: Madan Joshi (dialogues)
- Screenplay by: Vikram Bhatt; Salim Raza
- Produced by: Tahir Hussain
- Starring: Faisal Khan; Anjali Jathar; Dilip Dhawan
- Cinematography: Sameer Arya
- Edited by: B. Prasad
- Music by: Anand–Milind
- Production companies: Tahir Hussain Enterprises; T. V. Films
- Release date: 4 February 1994
- Country: India
- Language: Hindi

Madhosh (transl. "Drunk" or "Intoxicated") is a 1994 Indian film directed by Vikram Bhatt and produced by Tahir Hussain. The film is Tahir Hussain's son Faisal Khan's debut as a leading actor, having previously played bit parts in his brother Aamir Khan's films Qayamat Se Qayamat Tak and Jo Jeeta Wohi Sikandar. The film also stars Anjali Jathar in her film debut, Kiran Kumar, Dilip Dhawan and Supriya Pathak.

== Cast ==
- Faisal Khan as Suraj
- Anjali Jathar as Anjali
- Dilip Dhawan as Suraj's father
- Kiran Kumar as Anjali's father
- Supriya Pathak as Anjali's aunt
- Deven Bhojani as Suraj's friend
- Mushtaq Khan as Suraj's friend

== Soundtrack ==
Anand–Milind scored the music while Sameer authored the lyrics. The music wasn't successful, but is considered one of the best musical scores from the duo.

#	Title	Singer(s)
1	"Dushamani Chhodo Sanam"	Udit Narayan, Sadhana Sargam
2	"Tere Mere Mere Tere"	Udit Narayan, Kavita Krishnamurthy
3	"Dekho To Jaane Jaana"	Udit Narayan, Kavita Krishnamurthy
4	"Beparwah Bahut Din Ghoome"	Kumar Sanu, Udit Narayan
5	"Mere Sanam Suno Zara"	Udit Narayan, Sadhana Sargam
6	"Bewafa Sangdil"	Udit Narayan, Sadhana Sargam
