= Gali Gali Chor Hai =

- First Look Poster
- Directed by: Rumi Jaffery
- Written by: Rumi Jaffery; Mumukshu Mugdal
- Produced by: Nitin Manmohan; Prakash Chandnani; Jitendra Jain; Vivay Jain; Sangeetha Ahir; Sanjay Punamiya
- Starring: Akshaye Khanna; Shriya Saran; Mugdha Godse
- Cinematography: Gururaj R. Jois
- Edited by: A. Muthu
- Music by: Anu Malik
- Production company: One Up Entertainment Pvt Ltd
- Distributed by: Eros International
- Release date: 3 February 2012
- Running time: 109 minutes
- Country: India
- Language: Hindi
- Budget: ₹13 crore (US$1.3 million)
- Box office: ₹13.07 crore (US$1.4 million)(Net)

Gali Gali Chor Hai (transl. Thieves are everywhere) is a 2012 Indian Hindi-language black comedy film directed by Rumi Jaffery. It stars Akshaye Khanna, Shriya Saran and Mugdha Godse in the lead roles. The film's music was composed by Anu Malik. The film was released on 3 February 2012, to mixed to negative reviews.

== Plot ==
Bharat, an 'Aam Aadmi' (transl. common man), works part-time as 'Hanuman' in the local 'Ramleela' and full-time as a bank cashier. He lives in the heart of Bhopal with his wife Nisha, a schoolteacher, and his father, Shiv Narayan, an old-timer who values freedom and dreams of seeing his country free of corruption. Nisha is loving and caring but often doubts her husband, prioritising his promotion from cashier to manager over his onstage flying tricks. The household also has an uninvited guest, Amita, a young and beautiful call centre employee who often hitches a ride on Bharat's scooter when he is not busy taking Nisha to school.

Despite his wife's wishes, Bharat's greatest ambition is to progress from playing 'Hanuman' to portraying 'Lord Ram'. This puts him at odds with Sattu Tripathi, the younger brother of the local MLA, who plays Lord Ram poorly and resents being upstaged by Hanuman. Sattu's elder brother, MLA Manku, also clashes with Bharat, who refuses to rent him an extra room for his re-election campaign.

Bharat's peaceful life is disrupted when the local 'havaldaar' Kushwaah arrives at his home, claiming to have caught a thief, Chunnu Farishta, who allegedly stole a fan from his house. Bharat knows nothing about the theft, although the local 'paanwala', Bachhu Gulukand, is a sworn witness. Virtually compelled to appear in court, Bharat becomes embroiled in a judicial system plagued by fabricated testimonies, indifferent judges and corrupt officials.

As the case progresses, Bharat encounters demands for bribes involving police officers, criminals, witnesses, lawyers and a judge, exposing the widespread corruption permeating the system. His experiences force him to reconsider his ideals and the injustices faced by ordinary citizens. Determined to challenge the system, Bharat begins advocating for their rights. His efforts eventually attract national media attention when he exposes corruption within the system.

== Cast ==
- Akshaye Khanna as Bharat Narayan
- Shriya Saran as Nisha Pandit
- Mugdha Godse as Amita Bedi
- Annu Kapoor as Constable Parasuram Khuswa
- Satish Kaushik as Shiv Narayan, Bharat's father
- Akhilendra Mishra as Lawyer Dubey Ji aka Ravan
- Sashi Ranjan as Mohanlal
- Vijay Raaz as Chunnu Pharishta
- Jagdeep as Munshi Ji
- Murli Sharma as MLA Manku Tripathi
- Amit Mistry as Sattu Tripathi
- Mushtaq Khan as Constable
- Arun Verma
- Gulzar Dastur as Geeta Sharma
- Rajat Rawail as Bacchu Gulkand
- Anu Mudgal as Seeta
- Pankaj Sharma as Lakshman
- Mohit Baghel as Waiter
- Pranav Shekhar as Jamwant in Ramleela
- Veena Malik as an item dancer in the song "Channo" (special appearance)

== Reception ==
=== Critical reception ===
Taran Adarsh from Bollywood Hungama gave the film 2.5/5 and said "Gali Gali Chor Hai amuses intermittently, Fortunately the movie goes public at a juncture when anti-corruption appears to be the essence of the season. But the film could've done with a far more hard-hitting conclusion". Avijit Ghosh from Times of India also gave it 2.5/5 stating that "Gali Gali Chor Hai doesn't live up to its promise. Just like the anti-corruption movement at the moment." Rajeev Masand of IBNlive gave it two stars saying "Never smart enough to be described as a satire, it fails ultimately because it's dreadfully dull" Mansha Rastogi of nowrunning rated it two stars and said "Having a relatable plot at hand, Gali Gali Chor Hai, could've worked with a tighter screenplay and better execution". Karan Anshuman from the Mumbai Mirror gave it 1.5/5 and said "GGCH seems not only incomplete in thought but also technically: Basic scene to scene transitions missing, uneven sound". Shubhra Gupta from The Indian Express also rated it 1.5/5 mentioning that "Gali Gali Mein Chor Hai' pours old wine into a cracked bottle. When the need of the hour is to underplay, everyone opens their mouth out loud, and yells. The only relatively new thing is the setting".

=== Box office ===
Gali Gali Chor Hai had a very decent opening at the box office. The film netted 30 million over its first weekend. And through its course it netted in at the Box office INR +57.7 million (US$1.15 million) thus Box-Office India declaring it an average.

== Soundtrack ==
Gali Gali Chor Hai

Soundtrack album by Anu Malik
- Released: January 2012
- Genre: Film soundtrack
- Length: 28:49
- Label: T-Series

The music of this movie is composed by Anu Malik. The music rights were sold to T-Series and released in January 2012. The Soundtrack contains six original tracks including two official remixes of Gali Gali Chor Hai and Chhanno.

Track Listing
No.	Title	Singer(s)	Length
1.	"Gali Gali Chor Hai"	Kailash Kher	6:56
2.	"Suno Suno"	Mohit Chauhan, Anmol Malik	5:24
3.	"Chhanno"	Mamta Sharma	6:10
4.	"Gali Gali Chor Hai (Remix)"	Kailash Kher	4:03
5.	"Chhanno (Remix)"	Mamta Sharma	5:31
6.	"Gali Gali Shor Hai (Chorus)"		0:45
Total length:			28:49
