= Life Partner =

2009 Indian film by Rumi Jaffery

- Theatrical release poster
- Directed by: Rumi Jaffery
- Screenplay by: Yunus Sajawal
- Dialogues by: Rumi Jaffery
- Story by: Rumi Jaffery
- Produced by: Abbas–Mustan; Hussain Burmawala
- Starring: Govinda; Fardeen Khan; Tusshar Kapoor; Genelia D'Souza; Prachi Desai
- Cinematography: Sameer Arya
- Edited by: Hussain Burmawala; Sanjay Sankla
- Music by: Score: Sanjoy Chowdhury; Songs: Pritam; Guest Composers: Sachin–Jigar
- Production company: Burmawala Bros.
- Distributed by: Indian Films
- Release date: 14 August 2009
- Running time: 138 minutes
- Country: India
- Language: Hindi
- Budget: ₹140 million (US$1.5 million)
- Box office: ₹180 million (US$1.9 million)

Life Partner is a 2009 Indian Hindi-language romantic comedy film written and directed by Rumi Jaffery and produced by Abbas–Mustan under their banner, Burmawalla Bros.. It stars Govinda, Fardeen Khan, Tusshar Kapoor, Genelia D'Souza and Prachi Desai in lead roles.

== Plot ==
Karan and Bhavesh are close friends living in Cape Town, South Africa. Karan has a good life with a well-paying job. He is in a comfortable relationship with his beautiful yet childish and pampered girlfriend Sanjana, who changes her profession every six months, rather disastrously. Her father, who dislikes Karan, always tries to keep her happy and supports her. Bhavesh wishes for an arranged marriage and keeps a diary of all the beautiful things he will do to his wife after marriage. His father, Darshan Manibhai Patel, is a strict autocrat and patriarch. Jeet does not believe in marriage or love and is a womaniser. He encourages married women into divorcing their spouses so that his living as a divorce lawyer is uncompromised.

Bhavesh's father treats him as young and incapable of marriage, but on his wife's insistence, he travels with his family, along with Karan and Sanjana, to Gujarat to find Bhavesh a bride. In Gujarat, they stay at the palatial home of Bhavesh's father's friend, Vijay Singh Jadeja. Bhavesh meets some girls but ends up falling for Prachi, Vijay Singh's daughter, and they get married. During their wedding, Sanjana says "yes" to Karan's proposal as well, and they get married the same night.

The movie then switches to the present, where both couples are at court. Both couples are granted a divorce and the story goes back 6 months earlier, showing what led to the divorces when they came back to Cape Town from India.

After marriage, Karan and Sanjana's family life deteriorates, with Karan wanting domestic stability and Sanjana being a horrible homemaker. Karan finally loses patience with Sanjana after she accidentally burns down their apartment and yells at her, venting his frustration at her stupidity and his dislike for her father. Shocked and heartbroken, Sanjana leaves and sends a notice of divorce to him the very next morning.

Bhavesh is happy with Prachi, but Prachi is stifled by the old-fashioned ideals and strict rules of Bhavesh's father. She, without her father-in-law's knowledge, applies for a job – the very idea of which angers him. Bhavesh, taking sides with his father, slaps her at the same time Prachi's father arrives. Bhavesh, bound by his father's old-fashioned ideas, is unable to stand by his wife. This ends with Prachi divorcing Bhavesh.

Jeet later changes his lifestyle when he meets Anjali, who turns out to be different from all the other girls he has met, since she does not give up on him and expresses a genuine desire to marry him. He decides to marry her, and Karan and Bhavesh shout themselves hoarse at him, stating that since Jeet had facilitated their divorces, he has no right to get married. Jeet explains that he was wrong in taking a negative view of love and marriage and also says that wives or "life partners" always stood by their husbands, thus it is never worth it to break up such a relationship.

At Jeet's wedding, Sanjana enters the party, wearing a "bomb," shouting that Jeet was happily getting married when he had caused her divorce. With five minutes left for the bomb to explode, Karan and Sanjana have an argument as to why their divorce took place. Sanjana's father intervenes by saying that he had been against the relationship from the start, and he had sent the divorce papers to them without their knowledge. With only seconds left, Bhavesh's father also apologises to Prachi and the family for imposing his traditional values on them. However, the "bomb" turns out to be fake. When this is revealed to be a plan concocted by Jeet and Sanjana to bring everyone to admit their mistakes, everyone reconciles with each other.

At the end, Bhavesh's father lets go of his strict ideals and is shown interacting happily and in a modern manner with his family. Jeet becomes a marriage counsellor, now uniting the very people he separated, and Karan unsuccessfully tries to teach Sanjana how to cook.

== Cast ==
- Govinda as Advocate Jeet Oberoi
- Fardeen Khan as Karan Malhotra
- Tusshar Kapoor as Bhavesh Patel
- Genelia D'Souza as Sanjana Jugran / Sanjana Karan Malhotra aka Sanju
- Prachi Desai as Prachi Jadeja / Prachi Bhavesh Patel
- Anupam Kher as Mr. Suraj Jugran
- Darshan Jariwala as Darshan Manibhai Patel
- Shoma Anand as Bhavesh's mother
- Vikram Gokhale as Vijay Singh Jadeja
- Amrita Rao as Anjali Kumar / Anjali Jeet Oberoi (cameo appearance)

== Soundtrack ==
Life Partner

Soundtrack album by Pritam Chakraborty & Sachin–Jigar
- Released: 16 July 2009
- Recorded: 2008–2009
- Genre: Film soundtrack
- Length: 34:12
- Label: T-Series

Pritam Chakraborty chronology
Love Aaj Kal (2009)	Life Partner (2009)	Love Khichdi (2009)

Sachin–Jigar chronology
'Teree Sang' (2009)	Life Partner (2009)	'F.A.L.T.U' (2011)

The music for this film was composed by Pritam and Sachin–Jigar, with lyrics written by Javed Akhtar. The film has seven songs, featuring two remixes.

The song "Gunji Aangna Mein Shehnai" was composed by Sachin–Jigar.

Track #	Song	Artist(s)	Duration
01	"Kuke Kuke"	Shaan, Antara Mitra	04:22
02	"Teri Meri Yeh Zindagi"	Soham Chakrabarty & Shreya Ghoshal	04:32
03	"Aage Aage"	Mika Singh, Soham Chakraborty, Antara Mitra	03:59
04	"Gunji Aangna Mein Shehnai"	Sunidhi Chauhan, Keerthi Sagathia	05:11
05	"Poorza Poorza"	Sunidhi Chauhan, Kunal Ganjawala	04:41
06	"Kuke Kuke" (Remix by DJ A-Myth)	Shaan, Debojeet Dutta, Antara Mitra	05:01
07	"Poorza Poorza" (Remix by DJ A-Myth)	Sunidhi Chauhan, Kunal Ganjawala	04:26

== Reception ==
Life Partner netted ₹17.5 million (US$180,000) overseas in its opening week while it netted ₹180 million (US$1.9 million) domestically by the third week. It was elevated to average verdict by Box Office India.

In the United States the film grossed $110,240 while it obtained $347,100 from New Zealand, Fiji, the United Kingdom and Malta.

== Awards and nominations ==
- Nominated – IIFA Best Comedian Award - Govinda
- Nominated – Stardust Awards for Best Actor in a Comic Role - Govinda
