= Oppanda =

2022 Indian Kannada romantic-crime-action film

- Film poster
- Directed by: S.S.Sameer
- Written by: S.S.Sameer
- Story by: S.S.Sameer
- Produced by: Farheen Fathima
- Starring: Arjun Sarja; Radhika Kumaraswamy; J. D. Chakravarthy
- Cinematography: Amma Rajashekhar
- Edited by: Prabhu
- Music by: Subhash Anand
- Production company: FS Entertainments
- Release date: February 11, 2022
- Running time: 153 minutes
- Country: India
- Languages: Kannada tamil and telugu

Oppanda (transl. Deal) is a 2022 Indian Kannada-language crime action film written and directed by S.S.Sameer, making his debut. It features Arjun Sarja and Radhika Kumaraswamy along with J. D. Chakravarthy in the lead roles. The supporting cast includes Sony Charista and Faisal Khan, making his Kannada debut. The score and soundtrack for the film is by Subhash Anand and the cinematography is by Aamir lal and the editing is done by Prabhu.This film was planned as tri-lingual film, kannada tamil and telugu, the Telugu titled Iddaru.

== Cast ==
- Arjun Sarja as Sanjay Rangaswamy
- Radhika Kumaraswamy as Anjali
- J.D. Chakravarthy as Chakri
- K. Vishwanath as Rangaswamy
- SS Sameer
- Faisal Khan
- Sony Charista
- Ramjagan

== Production ==
The film was announced in November 2010 under the title Kontract. The filming began around September 2017. The film was initially conceived as a trilingual in Tamil and Telugu titled Iruvar Oppantham and Iddaru, respectively. However the other versions were dropped in favor of a dubbed release in Telugu. The film was wrapped before the pandemic by around March 2018. The film first had Arjun Sarja on board as the male lead. Radhika Kumaraswamy was cast later for the female lead character. The film later had JD Chakravarthy on board to play another lead character. The film was shot in Bengaluru, Mysuru, Hyderabad, and Bangkok. The film underwent a change in the title from Contract to Oppanda.

== Soundtrack ==
Oppanda

Soundtrack album by Subhash Anand
- Genre: Feature film soundtrack
- Language: Kannada
- Label: F Series Audio
- Producer: Farheen Fathima

The film's background score and the soundtracks are composed by Subhash Anand. The music rights were acquired by F Series Audio.

Tracklist
No.	Title	Length
1.	"Surya Obbane"
2.	"Enonthara Kanasu"
3.	"Chal Saath Saath"
4.	"Manasina Puta Puta"
5.	"Khandu Kelada"
6.	"Gundege Iruva Gande"
Total length:		27:41

== Release ==
The release of the film got delayed multiple times and film the film was released on 11 February 2022.

== Critical reception ==
=== Iddaru ===
Suhas Sistu of The Hans India rated two point seven five out of five and stated that the film manages to engage viewers through its balance of action, drama, and emotional weight. TA Kiran Kumar of Zee News Telugu noted that "Iddaru is a high-speed action drama" and rated two point seven five out of five. Hindustan Times Telugu critic stated that "Iddaru Pakka is a commercial action entertainer movie. Senior heroes Arjun and JD Chakraborty can watch this movie once for their acting".
