= Khote Sikkey =

- Directed by: Partho Ghosh
- Written by: Ranbir Pushp
- Produced by: Shashi Agarwal, Mahesh Naitani; K. Mohan
- Starring: Atul Agnihotri; Ayub Khan; Madhoo; Kareena Grover; Anjali Jathar; Suresh Oberoi
- Cinematography: K. V. Ramanna
- Edited by: R. Rajendran
- Music by: Rajesh Roshan
- Production company: Surya Shakthi Films
- Release date: 1998
- Country: India
- Language: Hindi

Khote Sikkey is a 1998 Indian Hindi-language film directed by Partho Ghosh and produced by Krishan Oberoi. It stars Atul Agnihotri and Ayub Khan.

== Plot ==
Rohit and Vijay are two criminals who obtain money from truckers by impersonating police officers. This gets them into trouble, as they are placed in prison by Inspector Ajay Sinha. With the help of another inmate, they manage to escape, with the police right on their tail. The inmate is shot and killed, but before that he gives them the contact info of underworld Don, Pukhraj Mahadevan. The duo contact Pukhraj and team up with him to rob a bank. Ajay witnesses Pukhraj in the getaway car, and immediately arrests him. However, the wily Pukhraj not only manages to win a "not guilty" verdict in Court, but also manages to embarrass Ajay in the eyes of his superiors and the Courts. Ajay must now must come up with a fool-proof plan to arrest Pukhraj, but before he does that he must reign in Pukhraj's newest recruits - that is if they let him.

== Cast ==
- Atul Agnihotri as Rohit
- Ayub Khan as Vijay
- Madhoo as Suman
- Krishan Oberoi as Inspector Ajay Sinha
- Kareena Grover
- Anjali Jathar as Kajol / Shalini Dwarkadas Verma
- Suresh Oberoi as Pukhraj Mahadevan
- Dinesh Hingoo as Nari Contractor
- Subbiraj as Senior Police Officer
- Mustaq Khan as Havaldar Hanuman Prasad

== Soundtrack ==
1. "Aankhon Se Aankhon Ki" - Hema Sardesai
2. "Dhak Dhak Dhadke Dil Yeh Mera" - Udit Narayan, Alka Yagnik
3. "Jhilmil Sitaaron Ne Kaha" - Udit Narayan, Poornima
4. "Na Todoge Dil" - Kumar Sanu, Poornima
5. "Sahiba Kehde Haan" - Kumar Sanu, Alka Yagnik
6. "Sari Duniya Bole" - Kumar Sanu, Alka Yagnik
