= Dhaval =

Dhaval is an Indian name. Notable people with the name include:

- Dhaval Dhairyawan (1979–2012), Indian photographer
- Dhavalbhai Patel (born 1986), Indian politician
- Neryosang Dhaval, Zoroastrian (Parsi) priest.

== See also ==
- Dhavala Satyam, Indian film director, producer, and writer
