= Mulaqaat =

2002 film by K. Ravi Shankar

- Directed by: K. Ravi Shankar
- Produced by: Shanoo Mehra
- Starring: Vinay Anand; Shivani Rathod; Milind Gunaji; Jackie Shroff; Madhoo
- Music by: Vishal Bhardwaj
- Release date: 20 September 2002
- Country: India
- Language: Hindi

Mulaqaat (English: 'Meeting') is a 2002 Indian Hindi-language film directed by K. Ravi Shankar and produced by Shanoo Mehra. It stars Jackie Shroff and Madhoo in pivotal roles.

== Plot ==
Javed loves Archana very much and marries her. After marriage at evening park amusement Archana get attacked by goons and Javed and his friend Jas together fights them down but middle of fight after seeing javed get strangulated Jas stabs with a big rod but instead of the goon Javed gets the stab and dies. Grief struck Archana keeps weeping and finally wears widow dress and lives in memory of Javed. Jas is in love with shabnam but shabnam's brother akthar doesn't like as he sees Jas as the killer of Javed. Including shabnam father sidik accept Jas to marry shabnam after Archana also confronts. But akthar arranged marriage with a close friend of him and on the day of marriage shabnam refuse to give the acceptance of marriage during which Archana with Jas enters, but akthar still angry takes out a revolver and fires but Archana gets shot and Archana unites Jas with shabnam.

== Cast ==
- Vinay Anand – Jas
- Shivani Rathod – Shabnam Khan
- Milind Gunaji – Akhtar Khan
- Jackie Shroff – Javed Khan
- Madhoo – Archana Vithalrao Patkar
- Arun Bakshi – Mr. Patkar
- Rita Bhaduri – Mrs. Patkar
- Kulbhushan Kharbanda – Siddiqui Khan

== Music ==
1. "Ek Aisi Ghazal" - Pankaj Udhas
2. "Ishq Rab Ki Dua" - Rohan Kapoor
3. "Jaa Le Ja Mera Dil" - Alka Yagnik, Abhijeet
4. "Tum Mile To Nahi" - Alka Yagnik
5. "Whisky Risky" - Roop Kumar Rathod, Vinay Anand
6. "Yeh Mera Geet" - Suresh Wadkar
