= Dhaal =

- Promotional Poster
- Directed by: Sameer Malkan
- Written by: Rajeev Kaul; Praful Parekh
- Produced by: Suresh Grover
- Starring: Vinod Khanna; Sunil Shetty; Amrish Puri; Danny Denzongpa; Arun Govil; Gautami
- Cinematography: Akram Khan
- Edited by: R.Rajendran
- Music by: Anu Malik
- Release date: 28 November 1997
- Running time: 148 minutes
- Country: India
- Language: Hindi

Dhaal (transl. Shield) is a 1997 Indian Hindi-language action thriller film directed by Sameer Malkan. The film stars Vinod Khanna, Sunil Shetty, Gauthami, Anjali Jathar, Amrish Puri and Danny Denzongpa. The production began in 1993 but faced several delays.

Dhaal released worldwide on 28 November 1997 and received mainly mixed reviews from critics. It was an average grosser at the box office.

== Plot ==
Inspector Varun Saxena (Vinod Khanna) successfully apprehends Pilot Baba's (Amrish Puri) son for running over and killing Deodhar (Arun Govil), a fellow police inspector. But Pilot's wily advocate, Indrajit Diwan (Danny Denzongpa), proves him innocent, and he is set free. When Varun confides of his frustrations with his garage-mechanic friend, Suraj (Sunil Shetty), he decides to study law and assist Varun. Later Varun arrests Suraj for attempting to rape Mrs. Deodhar (Kunika) and is put in prison. Subsequently, Mrs. Deodhar is killed and the evidence points to Varun who is also arrested, charged and imprisoned in the same prison as Suraj, who cannot wait to avenge his humiliation.

== Cast ==
- Vinod Khanna as Inspector Varun Saxena
- Sunil Shetty as Suraj
- Amrish Puri as Pilot Baba
- Danny Denzongpa as Advocate Vishwaraj Diwan
- Gautami as Sneha Diwan Saxena: Vishwaraj's younger sister; Varun's wife; Raju's mother; Anjali's paternal aunt
- Arun Govil as Inspector Deodhar
- Anjali Jathar as Anjali Diwan
- Lakshmikant Berde as Dodo
- Kunickaa Sadanand as Mrs. Deodhar

== Soundtrack ==
Dhaal

Soundtrack album by Anu Malik
- Released: 20 November 1996
- Genre: Feature film soundtrack
- Label: Venus Records & Tapes

All music was composed by Anu Malik. The song "Dil Maaka Dhina" is a copy of the Spanish song Macarena. This was Anu Malik's second copy of the song after "Dil Le Le Lena" from the movie Auzaar.

No.	Title.	Singer(s)	Lyricist(s)
1	"Hasil Mazaa Hai"	Bela Sulakhe, Abhijeet	Qateel Shifai
2	"Chhuo Na Chhuo Na"	Alisha Chinai	Dev Kohli
3	"Dheere Dheere Balam"	Alka Yagnik	Qateel Shifai
4	"Gussa Ussa Chhod"	Kumar Sanu	Anu Malik
5	"Dil Maaka Dina"	Anu Malik, Sunita Rao	Manohar Iyer
6	"Whisky Whisky"	Kumar Sanu, Anu Malik	Dev Kohli

== Notes ==
1. The film brought Vinod Khanna and Sunil Shetty together for the first time. They later worked together in Red Alert: The War Within (2009) & Koyleaanchal (2014).

2. Dhaal was Vinod Khanna's last film as lead hero. He took a sabbatical for 4 years before returning as a character actor with Deewanapan (2001).
