= Tahir Hussain =

Indian film producer (1938–2010)

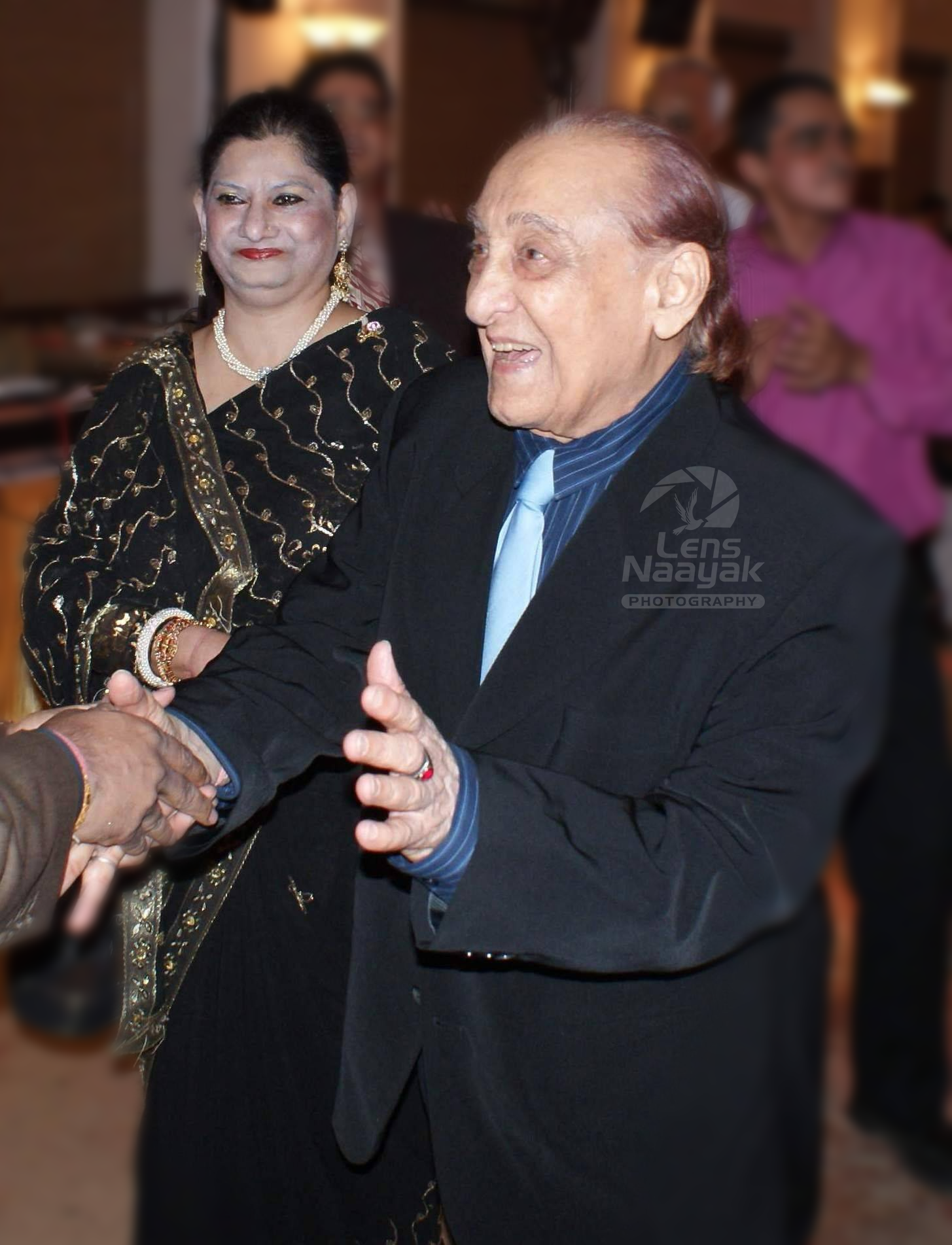
- Born: Mohammed Tahir Hussain Khan; 19 September 1938; Shahabad, Hardoi district, United Provinces, British India (now in Uttar Pradesh, India)
- Died: 2 February 2010 (aged 71); Mumbai, Maharashtra, India
- Burial place: Juhu Cemetery, Mumbai
- Occupations: Filmmaker, screenwriter, Actor
- Years active: 1961–1994
- Spouse: Zeenat Hussain (m. 1964)
- Children: 4, including Aamir Khan
- Relatives: See Khan–Hussain family

Mohammad Tahir Hussain Khan (19 September 1938 – 2 February 2010), better known as Tahir Hussain, was an Indian film producer, screenwriter, actor, and film director known for his works in Hindi cinema.

== Personal life ==
Hussain was born in Shahabad on 19 September 1938 to Mohammed Jaffar Hussain Khan, a schoolteacher who belonged to a zamindar family of Pashtun descent, and Aamna, who traced her Arab roots to Jeddah (modern-day Saudi Arabia) and was the niece of first education minister of India Maulana Azad, and he was the youngest of five children. Tahir Hussain was the father of Nikhat Khan, Farhat Khan, Aamir Khan and Faisal Khan. Nasir Hussain - the hit film producer, director, writer - was Tahir Hussain's elder brother and mentor.

Aamir acted in Qayamat Se Qayamat Tak, produced by his uncle Nasir Hussain and directed by his cousin Mansoor Khan. Tahir Hussain directed his son Aamir for the first (and only) time in his directorial debut Tum Mere Ho in 1990. On 2 February 2010, he died in Mumbai following a severe heart attack.

== Filmography ==
=== Producer ===
- Caravan (1971)
- Anamika (1973)
- Madhosh (1974)
- Zakhmee (1975)
- Phir Janam Lenge Hum/Janam Janam Na Saathi (1977)
- Khoon Ki Pukaar (1978)
- Locket (1986)
- Tum Mere Ho (1990)
- Hum Hain Rahi Pyar Ke (1993)
- Madhosh (1994) (asst. producer)

=== Actor ===
- Jab Pyar Kisise Hota Hai (1961)
- Phir Janam Lenge Hum/Janam Janam Na Saathi (1977)
- Dulha Bikta Hai (1982) as Judge in court

=== Director ===
- Tum Mere Ho (1990)

=== Writer ===
- Tum Mere Ho (1990)

=== Crew ===
- Teesri Manzil (1966) (production executive)
