= Aazmayish =

- Promotional Poster
- Directed by: Sachin Pilgaonkar
- Written by: Rumi Jaffery
- Produced by: Mohan Kumar
- Starring: Dharmendra; Rohit Kumar; Anjali Jathar; Prem Chopra; Ashok Saraf; Mohnish Bahl
- Music by: Anand–Milind
- Production company: Emkay Films Pvt. Ltd
- Release date: 28 April 1995
- Country: India
- Language: Hindi

Aazmayish is a 1995 Bollywood drama film starring Dharmendra, Anjali Jathar and producer Mohan Kumar's son Rohit Kumar in his acting debut. It is a story of a father and son, directed by Sachin Pilgaonkar.

== Summary ==
R.K Khanna owns a construction company. Shankar is a worker in Khanna's company. Shankar and all the laborers working with the company stay in slums. Khanna's father-in-law had promised to build cement houses for all the workers, but his life ended before he could fulfill his promise. When Khanna takes over the control of the company after his father-in-law, Shankar advocates the demand to get cement houses for all the workers on behalf of the entire labor community. Khanna, a very business-minded person and Shankar's demanding nature create an enmity between the two. The story takes a twist when Raja and Anju fall in love and their relationship is opposed by Khanna, while it is supported by Shankar.

== Cast ==
- Dharmendra as Shanker Singh Rathod
- Rohit Kumar as Raja Singh Rathod
- Anjali Jathar as Anju Khanna
- Mohnish Behl as Laxmikant "Lucky" Gupta
- Prem Chopra as R.K. Khanna
- Ashok Saraf as Roshanlal
- Paintal as Anwar
- Suhas Joshi as Mrs. Khanna
- Sulabha Arya as Mausi
- Master Kunal Khemu as Young Raja
- Kamaldeep as Verma
- Sripradha as Laxmi Shanker Rathod
- Mehmood Jr. as Vegetable vendor
- Dinesh Hingoo as Customs Officer Chhedha
- Poonam Dasgupta as Suman Gupt
- Aparajita as Suman's mom
- Sachin as Special appearance in song "Choodiyaan Banti Hain"

== Soundtrack ==
Anand–Milind composed the music of the film and Anand Bakshi wrote the lyrics.

#	Title	Singer(s)
1	"O My Daddy"	Kumar Sanu, Sonu Nigam
2	"Choodiyaan Banti Hain"	Sonu Nigam, Bela Sulakhe
3	"Mera Dil Kho Gaya"	Sonu Nigam, Alka Yagnik
4	"Yaar Mat Ja"	Sonu Nigam, Alka Yagnik
5	"Dhoond Rahe Hai Mere"	Alka Yagnik
6	"Yeh Roti Yeh Dal"	Abhijeet
7	"Kaanta Lage"	Sonu Nigam, Alka Yagnik
