= Chinna Chinna Aasai =

2026 Indian Malayalam-language film

- Theatrical release poster
- Directed by: Varsha Vasudev
- Written by: Varsha Vasudev
- Produced by: Abhijith Babuji
- Starring: Indrans; Madhoo
- Cinematography: Faiz Siddik
- Edited by: Reckson Joseph
- Music by: Govind Vasantha
- Production company: Babuji Productions
- Release date: 19 June 2026
- Country: India
- Language: Malayalam
- Box office: ₹3 crore

Chinna Chinna Aasai (transl. Little, little desire) is a 2026 Malayalam-language romantic drama film written and directed by Varsha Vasudev in her feature film debut. The film is produced by Abhijith Babuji under the banner of Babuji Productions. It stars Indrans and Madhoo in the lead roles, with music composed by Govind Vasantha.

The film is set in Varanasi and derives its title from a song from the 1992 Tamil film Roja, also starring Madhoo. The first look poster of the film was unveiled by Mani Ratnam who directed Roja. The film was released on 19 June 2026.

== Cast ==
- Indrans as Madhavan Maash
- Madhoo as Leela
  - Sai Janani as young Leela
- Aparna Balamurali as Janaki
- Jaffer Sadiq as Shetty
- Vishnu Agasthya as Trainchar
- Thambi Ramaiah as Tamil Association Officer
- Kaali Venkat as Leela's father
- Martin Jishil as Tour Coordinator
- Praveen Pancham Jaishwar as Boatman
- Sudhakar Mani as Chaiwala
- Arvind Dubey as Purohithan
- Jayant Raina as Kishan Bhai
- Gaurav as Tamil Association Officer's helper
- Aaradhya Kanojia as Diya
- T.D.C. Singh as Announcer
- Basanta Gupta as Saree Shop woman
- Praveen Singh as Fighting husband
- Priya Khatwani as Fighting wife
- Praveen Pandey as Hassan Bhai
- Isha Shukla as Khadeeja
- Meenakshi Dixit as Geetha
- Balram Panda as Gopal Ji
- Goswami as Karmi
- Ravikant Mishra as Thattukada Bhai
- Mohit Gupta as Giant Wheel Boy
- Ashutosh Yadav as Thief
- Seoul as Flautist

== Production ==
Chinna Chinna Aasai is written and directed by Varsha Vasudev, who previously directed the short film Ente Narayanikku.

== Release and reception ==
The film was released on 19 June 2026. Vishal Menon of The Hollywood Reporter India wrote, "Chinna Chinna Aasai is an extraordinary reflection on how it’s always the smallest of things that matter most when nothing else matters at all". Athira M. of The Hindu said that "The film's slow pace might not appeal to many viewers. Even then, Chinna Chinna Aasai is a film that will embrace you with its warmth and make you reflect on love, relationships, and life as a whole." Anandu Suresh of The Indian Express said that "Even if we try our best to like the movie somehow, its ending completely ruins the whole experience, with a climax that one can see coming from ten miles away." Anjana of The Times of India said that "Chinna Chinna Aasai succeeds as a tender exploration of elderly romance. It reminds us that love does not belong to any age. Like Varanasi itself, the film gently suggests that every journey, no matter how late, can lead to peace."

Home Media

The film's digital rights were bagged by JioHotstar.
