= Bhishma (1996 film) =

1996 film by Jagdish A Sharma

- DVD Cover
- Directed by: Jagdish A. Sharma
- Written by: Miraq Mirza
- Produced by: Asoo K.Nihalani; Raj Lalchandani; Ranjit Harma
- Starring: Mithun Chakraborty; Mohan Joshi; Harish Kumar; Anjali Jathar; Vani Viswanath
- Cinematography: Damodar Naidu
- Music by: Dilip Sen-Sameer Sen
- Production company: R.A.R. MOVIES
- Release date: 26 July 1996
- Running time: 125 min.
- Language: Hindi
- Budget: ₹2.5 crore
- Box office: ₹5.32 crore

Bhishma is a 1996 Indian Bengali-language action thriller film directed by Jagadish Sharma, starring Mithun Chakraborty, Harish kumar, Anjali Jathar, and Vani Viswanath. The film was released on 26 July 1996 under the banner of R.A.R. Movies. It was partially shot in Hindi.

== Plot ==
Paro, her mother, and her brother, Natwar, find an unconscious man near their town. They bring him to their house and nurse him back to health, only to find out that he has the mind of a 12-year-old child. They name him Bhola. Years pass, and Paro falls in love with Bhola for rescuing her from a molester. Before they can get married, Bhola is viciously attacked and left for dead by Paro's molester, and is hospitalized. While in the hospital, Police Sub-Inspector Abhimanyu Verma discovers Bhola is not who he claims to be, but rather a homicidal maniac - named Bhishma - wanted for killing three policemen and is possibly masquerading as a 12-year-old child to hide from the police.

== Cast ==
- Mithun Chakraborty as Bhola / Inspector Bhishma
- Vani Viswanath as Paro
- Mohan Joshi as Rana Saheb
- Harish as Sub-Inspector Abhimanyu Verma
- Anjali Jathar as Priya Rana
- Johnny Lever as Natwar
- Harish Patel as Ramdas
- Kader Khan as Jaunpuri
- Mukesh Rishi as Nagesh Rana
- Upasana Singh as Bharti Verma
- Avtar Gill as Pratap Rana
- Arun Bakshi as Inspector Jagawar
- Sulabha Deshpande as Bhola's Mom
- Dinesh Hingoo as Milavatram
- Gavin Packard as Goon in the village
- Javed Khan as Gangu
- Kamaldeep as Superintendent of Police
- Sanjeeva as Rana's henchman
- Birbal as Havaldar in the hospital

== Music ==
1. "Chahe Jaan Jaye Chahe Dil" - Udit Narayan, Kavita Krishnamurthy
2. "Kya Nahin Kiya" - Udit Narayan, Alka Yagnik
3. "Tere Bina Duniya" - Kumar Sanu
4. "Mere Seene Mein Dil" - Jolly Mukherjee, Meena Patel
5. "O Soni O Soni" - Udit Narayan
6. "Dil Jo Lagaye" - Udit Narayan, Kavita Krishnamurthy

== Box office ==
The film was above average at the box office.
