= Madhoo =

Indian film actress (born 1969)

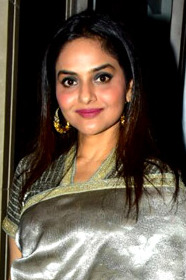
- Madhoo at Hall of Fame 2018
- Born: Madhoobala Raghunath Malini; 26 March 1969 (age 57); Madras (now Chennai), Tamil Nadu, India
- Other names: Madhubala; Madhu Malini
- Years active: 1991–present
- Spouse: Anand Shah (m. 1999)
- Children: 2
- Relatives: Hema Malini (cousin)

Madhoo Shah (born Madhoobala Raghunath Malini; 26 March 1969), also known formerly as Madhubala, is an Indian actress known for her works predominantly in Hindi, Tamil, Telugu, Malayalam and Kannada language films. She was a part of Movies like Phool Aur Kaante (1991), Roja (1992), Allari Priyudu (1992), Yoddha (1992), and Gentleman (1993).

== Early life and family ==
Madhoobala Raghunath Malini was born in a Tamil family. She was educated at St. Joseph's High School, Juhu and at University of Mumbai. She is the cousin of actress Hema Malini and therefore the aunt of Esha Deol.

== Career ==
Madhoo was signed on by action director Veeru Devgan for his son Ajay Devgan's debut in Phool Aur Kaante (1991), but her first release was K. Balachander' s Azhagan (1991), co-starring Mammooty, Bhanupriya and Geetha. She made her Hindi movie debut with in Phool Aur Kaante in 1991. She made her debut in the Malayalam film Ottayal Pattalam (1991), opposite Mukesh. The title role in Mani Ratnam's Roja (1992) made her very popular. She made her comeback in 2008, in the Hindi-language film, Kabhi Socha Bhi Na Tha, and has been appearing in supporting roles in films since then. She has acted in 5 films with her real name Madhu. She made a comeback to the Tamil screen with Balaji Mohan's Tamil-Malayalam bilingual Vaayai Moodi Pesavum / Samsaaram Aarogyathinu Haanikaram in 2014. She has been hosting the DD National music television series Rangoli since August 2019.

Besides it, she has worked in television series such as Kaveri, Devi, Soundaravalli and Aarambh: Kahaani Devsena Ki. She has also appeared as a guest judge at some reality shows.

== Personal life ==
She married Anand Shah on 19 February 1999 whom she met during a photoshoot. They have two daughters Amaya and Keia. Madhoo's husband is the cousin of Jay Mehta, who is married to actress Juhi Chawla.

== Filmography ==
=== Feature films ===
Year	Title	Role	Language	Notes	Ref
1991	Azhagan	Swapna	Tamil		
1991	Phool Aur Kaante	Pooja	Hindi	Nominated - Filmfare Award for Best Female Debut	
1991	Ottayal Pattalam	Gopika Varma/Indu	Malayalam		
1991	Neelagiri	Anitha	Malayalam		
1992	Ennodishtam Koodamo	Aarathi Menon	Malayalam		
1992	Yodha	Ashwathy	Malayalam		
1992	Vaaname Ellai	Karpagam	Tamil		
1992	Roja	Roja	Tamil	Tamil Nadu State Film Award Special Prize; Nominated-Filmfare Award for Best Actress – Tamil	
1992	Allari Priyudu	Kavita Rani	Telugu		
1993	Annayya	Saraswathi	Kannada		
1993	Gentleman	Susheela	Tamil		
1993	Pehchaan	Tina	Hindi		
1994	Fauj	Kamli	Hindi		
1994	Elaan	Mohini Sharma	Hindi		
1994	Prem Yog	Anita	Hindi		
1994	Zaalim	Madhu	Hindi		
1994	Brahma	Chanda	Hindi		
1994	Janta Ki Adalat	Malathi	Hindi		
1994	Senthamizh Selvan	Vaidegi	Tamil		
1994	Aavesam	Madhu	Telugu		
1994	Puttinilla Metinilla		Telugu		
1995	Mohini	Ragini	Hindi		
1995	Diya Aur Toofan	Aasha	Hindi		
1995	Hathkadi	Rani	Hindi		
1995	Jallaad	Gayatri	Hindi		
1995	Ravan Raaj	Geeta Suzie	Hindi		
1995	Hum Hain Bemisaal	Marya	Hindi		
1996	Diljale	Shabnam	Hindi		
1996	Return of Jewel Thief	Madhu	Hindi		
1996	Mr. Romeo	Madhu	Tamil		
1996	Panchalankurichi	Pottu Kanni	Tamil		
1997	Udaan	Madhu	Hindi		
1997	Mere Sapno Ki Rani	Vandana Nehle	Hindi		
1997	Yeshwant	Raagini Yeshwant Lohar	Hindi		
1997	Sher-E-Hindustan	Dancer	Hindi	Special appearance	
1997	Iruvar	Dancer	Tamil	Special appearance	
1997	Chilakkottudu	Madhu	Telugu		
1998	Hafta Vasuli	Inspector Durga	Hindi		
1998	Khote Sikkey	Suman	Hindi		
1998	Zulm-O-Sitam	Meena 'Billo'	Hindi		
1998	Sar Utha Ke Jiyo	Shalu	Hindi		
1998	Ganesh	Divya	Telugu		
1999	Chehraa	Simran	Hindi		
2002	Mulaqaat	Archana Patkar	Hindi		
2008	Kabhi Socha Bhi Na Tha	Radhika	Hindi		
2011	Tell Me O Kkhuda	Geeta	Hindi		
2011	Love U...Mr. Kalakaar!	Ritu's Aunt	Hindi		
2013	Anthaku Mundhu Aa Tharuvatha	Vidhya	Telugu		
2014	Vaayai Moodi Pesavum	Sridevi/Vidhya	Tamil	Bilingual film	
2014	Samsaaram Aarogyathinu Haanikaram	Sridevi/Vidhya	Malayalam	Bilingual film	
2015	Ranna	Saraswathi	Kannada	Nominated - Filmfare Award for Best Supporting Actress Kannada	
2015	Surya vs Surya	Nikhil's Mother	Telugu		
2016	Nannaku Prematho	Divya's Mother	Telugu		
2016	Naanu Mattu Varalakshmi		Kannada		
2019	Seetharama Kalyana	Geetha's mother	Kannada		
2019	Agni Devi	Shakuntala Devi	Tamil		
2019	Premier Padmini	Shruthi	Kannada		
2020	College Kumar	Janaki	Bilingual		
2021	Nail Polish	Shoba Bhusan	Hindi	ZEE5 Film	
2021	Thalaivi	V. N. Janaki Ramachandran	Hindi-Tamil		
2022	Dejavu	DGP Asha Pramod	Tamil		
2022	Raymo	Bhavana	Kannada		
2022	Repeat		Telugu		
2023	Premadesam	Arjun's mother	Telugu		
2023	Shaakuntalam	Menaka	Telugu		
2024	Eagle	Gayatri Devi	Telugu		
2024	Kartam Bhugtam	Seema	Hindi		
2025	Kannappa	Pannaga	Telugu		
2026	Chinna Chinna Aasai	Leela	Malayalam		
2026	Governor	Vandita	Hindi		

=== Television series ===
Year	Title	Role	Language	Notes
2001	Kaveri	Kaveri	Tamil	
2004	Devi	Devi Parvati	Hindi	
2012	Soundaravalli	Soundaravalli	Tamil	Cameo
2017	Aarambh: Kahaani Devsena Ki	Maharani Sambhavija	Hindi	
2017	Aarambh: Kahaani Devsena Ki	Padmavija	Hindi	
2017	Koshish Se Kamyabi Tak	Celebrity guest	Hindi	
2017	D4 Junior v/s Senior	Celebrity Judge	Malayalam	Grand finale episode
2021	Super Dancer	Guest	Hindi	Grandparents Special (Sat) Madhoo Shah Special (Sun)
2021	The Kapil Sharma Show	Guest	Hindi	Along with Juhi Chawla and Ayesha Jhulka
2023	Fireflies: Parth Aur Jugnu	Ira Ranaut	Hindi	ZEE5
2023	Sweet Kaaram Coffee	Kaveri	Tamil	Amazon Prime Video
2024	Manorathangal	Gita Parekh	Malayalam	ZEE5 Anthology series Segment : Vilpana
