= Vishwasghaat =

- Promotional poster
- Directed by: Himanshu Brahmbhatt
- Written by: Dilip Shukla
- Produced by: Pradeep Shirodkar
- Starring: Sunil Shetty; Anjali Jathar; Anupam Kher
- Cinematography: Sanjay Malvankar
- Edited by: Prashant Khedekar; Vinod Nayak
- Music by: Shyam Surender
- Production company: Revati Films
- Release date: 19 January 1996
- Running time: 135 mins
- Country: India
- Language: Hindi

Vishwasghaat (Betrayal) is a 1996 Bollywood action film directed by Himanshu Brahmbhatt. The film stars Sunil Shetty, Anjali Jathar and Anupam Kher.

== Plot ==
Rammohan lives a poor lifestyle in India along with his grandson, Avinash, the only child of his late son, Indermohan. Rammohan is disappointed with Avinash as he always seems to be getting into trouble and fisticuffs. Quite unknown to him, Avinash makes a living by wrestling. Then one day Rammohan finds out that Avinash has got into a fight with a gangster named Yeda Topi, who had complained to the police, and as a result Avinash had been arrested, held in a cell, and beaten up Police Inspector Inamdar. Rammohan arranges for Avinash's bail, but warns him not to get into trouble again. Instead of coming home, Avinash disappears for several days, compelling Rammohan to file a missing persons' report. Rammohan does get re-united with his grandson - only to find out that Avinash is not wanted by the police for the murder of Yeda Topi, but he has also been masquerading as Dr. Sunil Verma, and romancing Sunil's mentally unstable girlfriend, Neha Khurana. Watch what impact these revelations have on their relationship.

== Cast ==
- Sunil Shetty as Avinash Saxena / Dr. Sunil Verma
- Anjali Jathar as Neha Khurana
- Anupam Kher as Indramohan Saxena / Professor Khurana
- Kiran Kumar as Advocate Chadha
- Mushtaq Khan as Gullu
- Mahesh Anand as Babu Seth
- Rakesh Bedi as Havaldar Lepatakde
- Deep Dhillon as Inspector Inamdar
- Avtar Gill as DCP Gill
- Chandrakant Gokhale as Rammohan Saxena
- Gavin Packard as Foreign Tiger
- Mac Mohan as Raja
- Ishrat Ali as Yeda Topi
- Amrit Patel as Rammohan's Neighbour

== Songs ==
Song	Singer
"Tera Intezar Hai"	Lata Mangeshkar
"Yeh Dil Kyun Dhadakta Hai, Reh Rehke Machalta Hai"	Lata Mangeshkar, Kumar Sanu
"Deewangi Yeh Jo Hai Pyar Ki, Kam Ho Kabhi Yeh"	Lata Mangeshkar, Kumar Sanu
"Jaan-E-Man Jaan-E-Jaan, Dil Ne Di Yeh Sada"	Lata Mangeshkar, Kumar Sanu
"Hoga Hoga"	Alisha Chinai
