= Mela (2000 film) =

- Theatrical release poster
- Directed by: Dharmesh Darshan
- Screenplay by: Neeraj Vora; Sanjeev Duggal; Robin Bhatt
- Dialogues by: Neeraj Vora Dharmesh Darshan
- Story by: Suneel Darshan
- Produced by: Ganesh Jain
- Starring: Aamir Khan; Twinkle Khanna; Faisal Khan; Johnny Lever; Tinu Verma; Asrani
- Cinematography: Rajan Kinagi
- Edited by: Bharat
- Music by: Songs: Anu Malik; Rajesh Roshan; Lesle Lewis; Background Score: Surinder Sodhi
- Production company: Venus Records & Tapes
- Release date: 7 January 2000
- Running time: 172 minutes
- Country: India
- Language: Hindi
- Budget: est.₹18 crore
- Box office: est.₹25 crore

Mela (transl. Carnival) is a 2000 Indian Hindi-language masala film directed by Dharmesh Darshan and produced by Ganesh Jain. The film stars Aamir Khan, Twinkle Khanna and Faisal Khan.

Mela was released on 7 January 2000. It received mixed reviews from critics and was a commercial failure.

== Plot ==
Roopa Singh is the only sister of her soldier brother named Ram Singh, who returns to her village in Chandanpur to arrange her marriage in the form of a carnival. However, Roopa's happiness is short-lived as the village is raided by a group of terrorists led by Gujjar Singh, who murders a visiting politician and is attracted to Roopa. As Gujjar attempts to escape with the terrified Roopa, Ram and Roopa's young friend Gopal come to her rescue, only to be killed by Gujjar, who threatens Roopa that she will only be his mistress without the love of a brother or lover. Enraged, Roopa attempts to commit suicide by jumping into a waterfall, but she survives and, upon vowing to confront and destroy Gujjar, steals the clothes of a theatre actor named Kishan, who works with his best friend Shankar.

While finding his clothes and later stopping at a restaurant, Kishan meets Roopa and is angry about what she did. He also gets into a brawl with some goons who try to harass Roopa while demanding his clothes to be returned by her, while Shankar rescues Kishan after he was about to be killed by them, resulting in the restaurant being ruined, only to be paid for by Shankar from Kishan's wallet. Discovering that the duo is going to Khanpur, Roopa gets behind their truck. At a police check, they meet Insp. Pakkad Singh, who also takes a look at Roopa, because of which he suspects the duo, but later he finds nothing. Eventually, he leaves them, and they later find that she is really hiding in the truck. Kishan, initially angry, falls in love with her and decides to make Roopa the heroine of their dance show. With no option, Roopa travels with them and tries to escape, but returns when chased by the gang and a drunken cop named Surendra Pratap Singh, her rejected fiancée. Roopa is saved by Shankar and Kishan, where she feigns love for Kishan, and the two men agree to help her return to Chandanpur, while Shankar despises her. Learning that Kishan is going to marry her, Roopa feels guilty over her betrayal and reveals her past. Shankar, initially enrages for what she did, becomes her brother while Kishan is heartbroken and leaves in disgust.

Roopa and Shankar return to Chandanpur, where Shankar mobilizes the village and attempts to set a trap for Gujjar, who has learnt of Roopa's survival and terrorizes the village to find out her whereabouts. The trap backfires horribly until Kishan returns with Pakkad Singh, who is suspended for some reason. The trap is reset with another carnival, and the terrorists attack as planned. Kishan and Shankar chase Gujjar, and after a long chase, Kishan shoots at him, but the duo finds another dacoit who impersonates him, revealing that Gujjar has already kidnapped Roopa. Roopa and the duo are taken to Gujjar's hideout, where they are forced to fight him and his men. Gujjar beats both Kishan and Shankar up, but Roopa intercepts him. Gujjar retaliates by slapping her. He again taunts Roopa that she will be his mistress. As Kishan and Shankar run towards Gujjar, he shoots Shankar unconscious. Kishan proceeds to attack Gujjar, but Gujjar's men intercept Kishan. As Gujjar is about to gun Kishan down, Roopa again intercepts him. Afterwards, Kishan is tied up and hung onto the cliff. Gujjar taunts Roopa about her love for Kishan and her honour; he ferociously orders Gujjar to leave her alone which cause Gujjar's men laugh at Kishan screaming. Gujjar molests her only for Roopa shouting for Shankar. Shankar gains consciousness and saves Roopa by flinging Gujjar leftwards and also saves Kishan. Kishan fights Gujjar. During the fight as Gujjar is about to kill Kishan with the very knife with which he killed Ram Singh, Kishan counterattacks with a savage headbutt which brutally disarms and overwhelms Gujjar. With the arrival of Chandanpur's villagers, Gujjar's men are finished, while Kishan kills Gujjar with Shankar and Roopa's help.

While driving along with Kishan and Roopa one day, Shankar meets Champakali, where Kishan and Roopa watch them.

== Cast ==
- Aamir Khan as Kishan Pyare
- Twinkle Khanna as Roopa Singh (faked herself as Radha to Kishan)
- Faisal Khan as Shankar Shane
- Tinu Verma as Gujjar Singh
- Ayub Khan as Ram Singh, Roopa's brother (Special Appearance)
- Johny Lever as Inspector Pakkad Singh
- Navneet Nishan as Bulbul, a Postwoman
- Asrani as Banwari Baniya
- Tiku Talsania as Murari Mukhiya
- Kavi Kumar Azad as Warning Watchman
- Sharad Sankla as Warning Watchman
- Archana Puran Singh as Vidyavati, a village flirt
- Tanvi Azmi as Gopal's mother
- Parmeet Sethi as Surendra Pratap Singh (special appearance)
- Kulbhushan Kharbanda as Minister (special appearance)
- Aishwarya Rai as Champakali (special appearance)
- Viju Khote as Patil Rao Singh
- Harish Patel as Seth Chandulal Popatlal
- Anirudh Agarwal as Kaali
- Veeru Krishnan as Ghungroo
- Omkar Kapoor as Gopal, Roopa's best friend (Special appearance)

== Production ==
Kajol was initially offered the female lead in the film. However, she refused, as she was concerned about Aamir Khan's habit of doing multiple takes. The role ultimately went to Twinkle Khanna. Darshan told in an interview that the 1971 film Caravan was an inspiration for Mela.

Aditya Pancholi was signed for villain's role but opted out as he did not want to be bare chested throughout the film.

== Soundtrack ==
Mela

Soundtrack album by Anu Malik Rajesh Roshan Lesle Lewis
- Released: 20 January 1999
- Genre: Feature film soundtrack
- Label: Venus Records & Tapes

Aamir Khan, approached and persuaded A. R. Rahman to do compose music for the film, but due to time constraints, Rahman declined the offer. The music was then composed by 4 composers, with Anu Malik, Rajesh Roshan, and Lesle Lewis composing the songs and Surinder Sodhi composing the film score.

The song placements in this movie were heavily criticised, particularly the excessive usage of the title track ‘Mela Dilon Ka’. The lyrics were also perceived to be inappropriate as they were paradoxical and contradictory in nature.

=== Track listing ===
All lyrics are written by Dev Kohli, Dharmesh Darshan, Sameer.

No.	Title	Lyrics	Music	Singer(s)	Length
1.	"Mela Dilon Ka"	Dharmesh Darshan	Anu Malik	Alka Yagnik	03:36
2.	"Dekho 2000 Zamana Aa Gaya"	Dharmesh Darshan	Lesle Lewis	Lesle Lewis, Hariharan, Aamir Khan	04:54
3.	"Dhadkan Mein Tum"	Sameer	Anu Malik	Alka Yagnik, Kumar Sanu	06:23
4.	"Durga Hai Meri Maa"	Traditional	Anu Malik	Kavita Krishnamurthy, Mohammed Aziz	05:03
5.	"Kamariya Lachke Re"	Sameer	Rajesh Roshan	Anuradha Paudwal, Udit Narayan, Abhijeet Bhattacharya	06:02
6.	"Chori Chori Gori Se"	Sameer	Rajesh Roshan	Jai Rathod, Abhijeet Bhattacharya& UditNarayan	06:26
7.	"Mela Dilon Ka II" (Celebration)	Dev Kohli	Anu Malik	Sonu Nigam, Alka Yagnik, Roop Kumar Rathod, Shankar Mahadevan, Nitin Mukesh, Hema Sardesai, Jaspinder Narula and Anmol	10:37
8.	"Mela Dilon Ka III"	Dev Kohli, Dharmesh Darshan	Anu Malik	Abhijeet Bhattacharya, Shankar Mahadevan, Alka Yagnik, Sadhana Sargam, Udit Narayan, Sonu Nigam, Poonam	07:28
9.	"Tujhe Rab Ne Banaya"	Sameer	Anu Malik	Udit Narayan, Anuradha Paudwal	04:47

Sify gave the album a 3/5 rating.

== Reception ==
Sharmila Taliculam of Rediff called Aamir Khan as the "saving grace" of the film and the "only one who does complete justice to his role". She found the film a mix of The Seven Samurai, Caravan and Sholay and also praised Tinu Verma's performance labeling his portrayal of the antagonist as "convincingly menancing". She noted that dubbing Khanna's voice was a "gamble that ... misfired" and "[added] unnecessary drama and aggression to her role". Sify gave 3 out of 5 stars and wrote "Mela is not the best film to start the millennium with, but if you are an Aamir Khan fan you can tolerate it, but for his sakealone."
