= Shastra (1996 film) =

- Promotional Poster
- Directed by: Sanjay Khanna
- Written by: Rumi Jaffery
- Produced by: Nadir Irani; Nadeem Irani
- Starring: Suniel Shetty; Anjali Jathar; Danny Denzongpa; Anupam Kher
- Cinematography: Najeeb Khan; Teja
- Edited by: Yusuf Khan
- Music by: Aadesh Shrivastava
- Production company: Nariman Pictures
- Distributed by: B4U Motion Pictures
- Release date: 4 October 1996
- Running time: 144 mins
- Country: India
- Language: Hindi

Shastra is a 1996 Indian Hindi-language action film directed by Sanjay Khanna. The film stars Suniel Shetty and Anjali Jathar.

== Plot ==
Vijay Khanna's sole ambition is to become a collector like his father was. He is concentrating completely on his studies except for a few disturbances by Pooja who loves him and wants to marry him. Vijay always believed that his parents were in fact murdered and not killed in an accident, by their old faithful security officer Babu. Vijay Khanna starts searching for Babu, and finally when he finds him, Babu tells him that he was merely used as a pawn to cover up his parents' murder and the actual killer is roaming freely, and only one man can lead Vijay to the killer and that is Girdhari in Khandala. But before Vijay can find the truth, Girdhari is killed. Vijay and Babu start working in a casino owned by Shanti Prasad. There the local don Rana becomes their enemy, who is after Shanti Prasad's casino and Vijay's life. Finally when Vijay decides to leave Khandala, he learns of the actual murderers. Vijay loses Babu in the fight. Now, Vijay is alone to fight with his enemies. Eventually, he managed to track down the killer of his parents.

== Cast ==
- Suniel Shetty as Vijay Khanna
- Anjali Jathar as Pooja Prasad
- Danny Denzongpa as Babu
- Farida Jalal as Aunty
- Anupam Kher as Shanti Prasad
- Mohan Joshi as Rana
- Mukesh Rishi as Badshah Khan
- Avtar Gill as Police Commissioner
- Mushtaq Khan as Prem
- Dinesh Hingoo as Principal Badra
- Kunickaa Sadanand as Sonia
- Gavin Packard as College Punk
- Achyut Potdar as Vijay Khanna's guardian
- Jack Gaud as Sonia's brother
- Ali Asgar as Vijay Khanna's friend
- Lalit Tiwari as Girdhari

== Soundtrack ==
Shastra

Soundtrack album by Aadesh Shrivastav
- Released: 7 September 1995 (Audio Cassette); 1 June 1996 (Audio CD)
- Venues: West Mumbai, Maharashtra
- Studios: Anand Recording Studio, Mehboob Studio & Sunny super sound
- Genre: Feature film soundtrack
- Length: 37 Min 13 Sec duration
- Language: Hindi
- Labels: Trimurti Sounds; BIG B Music; T-Series
- Producers: Nadeem Irani & Nadir Irani

The music of the film was composed Aadesh Shrivastav and the lyrics were penned by Shyam Raj . The soundtrack was released in September 1995 on Audio Cassette in Trimurti Sounds and in June 1996 on Audio CD in Big B Music which consists of 6 songs while Currently its copyright is with T-Series, link of online streaming audio songs https://gaana.com/album/shastra . The full album is recorded by Kumar Sanu, Udit Narayan, Abhijeet Bhattacharya, Babul Supriyo, Vijeta Pandit, Poornima, Hema Sardesai, Aditya Narayan & Sunidhi Chauhan, which she making debut as playback singer.

Track list
| No. | Title | Singer(s) | Length |
|---|---|---|---|
| 1. | "Kya Ada Kya Jalwe" | Udit Narayan |
| 2. | "Ladki Deewani Ladka Deewana" | Udit Narayan, Aditya Narayan and Sunidhi Chauhan |
| 3. | "Kuch Hua Re Hua Re" | Babul Supriyo, Poornima |
| 4. | "Wade Na Ho Kasme Na Ho" | Kumar Sanu, Vijeta Pandit |
| 5. | "More Saiyan" | Hema Sardesai |
| 6. | "Shastra Shastra" | Abhijeet |
