= Anjali Jathar =

Indian model and actress

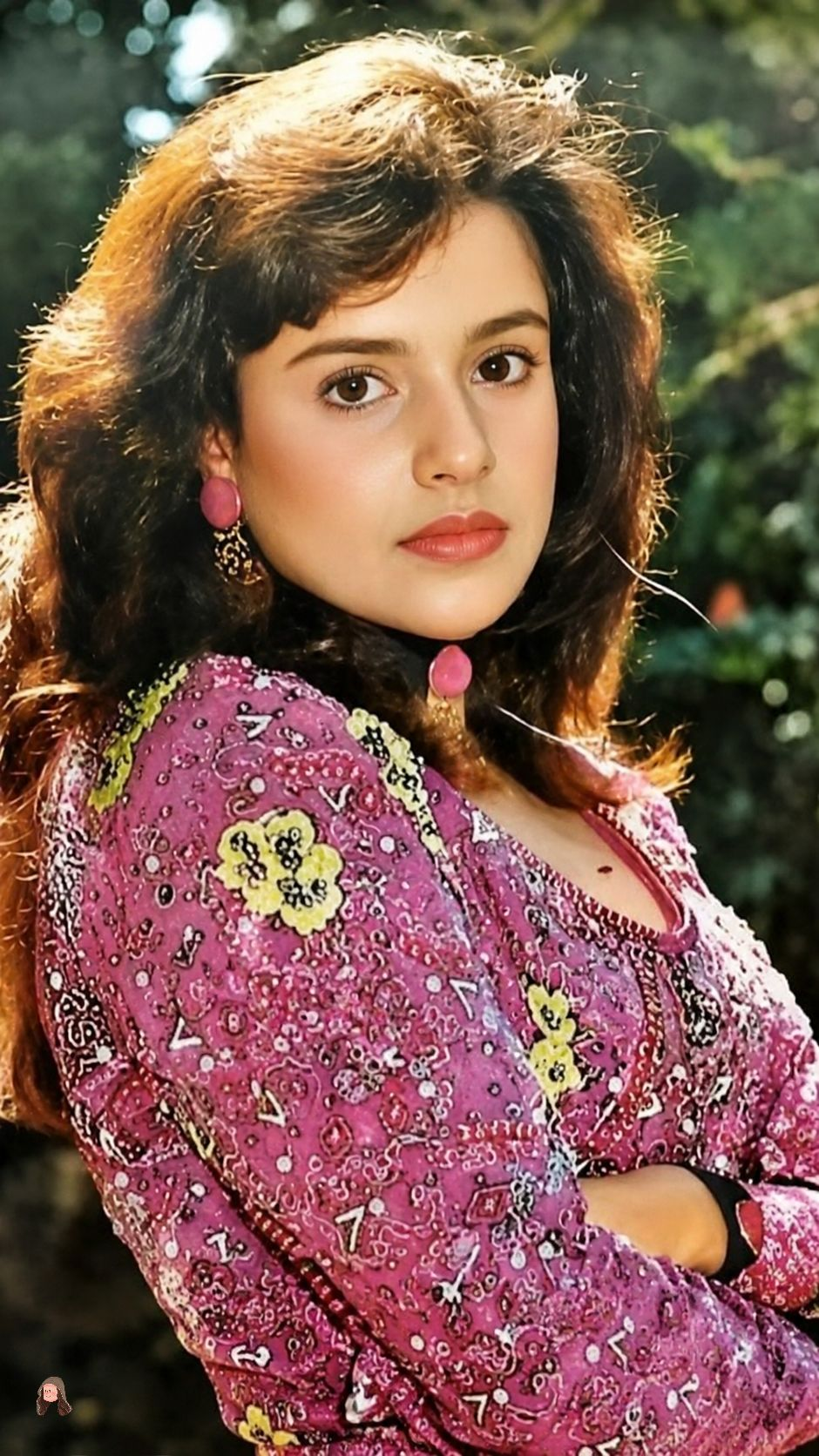
- Born: 16 June 1976 (age 50); Mumbai, Maharashtra, India
- Occupations: Actress, model
- Years active: 1994–1998

Anjali Jathar is a former Indian actress and model who acted in several Hindi films.

== Biography ==
Before coming to Bollywood Jathar was seen in a Liril soap advertisement in 1991. She made her Bollywood debut in 1994 with Madhosh. In 1995 she was seen in Aazmayish, Gundaraj and Trimurti. She appeared in films like Shastra, Vishwasghaat and Bhishma in 1996. Her film Dhaal was released in 1997. Her last film Khote Sikkey was released in 1998.

Jathar married Kaushik Paul. They have a son whose name is Riaan. Initially, they settled in San Francisco. Later they moved to Raleigh where she runs a dance academy called "Anjali Jathar Bollywood Dance Academy".

== Filmography ==
Year	Title	Role	Notes
1994	Madhosh	Anjali	Debut film
1995	Aazmayish	Anju Khanna	
1995	Gundaraj	Pooja	
1995	Trimurti	Radha Chaudhry	
1996	Shastra	Pooja Prasad	
1996	Vishwasghaat	Neha Khurana	
1996	Bhishma	Priya Rana	
1997	Dhaal	Anjali Diwan	
1998	Khote Sikkey	Kajol/ Shalini	Last film
