= Rumi Jaffery =

Indian film director (born 1974)

- Born: Rumman Ahmed; 23 March 1966 (age 59); Bhopal, Madhya Pradesh, India
- Occupations: Director, screenwriter
- Years active: 1986–present
- Parent: Kausar Siddiqui

Rumi Jaffery is an Indian scriptwriter and filmmaker who works predominantly in Hindi cinema. He is popular for penning the scripts of Coolie No. 1 (1995), Hero No. 1 (1997), and Biwi No.1 (1999) in association with David Dhawan. He wrote scripts for around 50 films before turning into a director with God Tussi Great Ho (2008). He then went on to direct Life Partner (2009), Gali Gali Chor Hai (2012), and Chehre (2021).

== Early life and background ==
Rumy Jaffery was born in Bhopal, India to renowned poet Kausar Siddiqui. He later moved to Bombay to pursue his career in Bollywood. He has worked in theater since the age of 10.

== Career ==
Rumy debuted as writer with 1992 Bollywood film Paayal and went on to write for over 54 films. He is popular for his works in collaboration with David Dhawan. He has also directed films such as God Tussi Great Ho,Life Partner, Gali Gali Chor Hai and Chehre.

== Filmography ==
=== As screenwriter ===
Year	Title
1992	Paayal
1993	Shreemaan Aashique
1993	Waqt Hamara Hai
1993	Rang
1994	Anjaam
1994	Pehla Pehla Pyar
1995	Aazmayish
1995	Coolie No. 1
1995	Sarhad: The Border of Crime
1995	Saajan Ki Baahon Mein
1996	Saajan Chale Sasural
1996	Tu Chor Main Sipahi
1996	Shastra
1997	Judwaa
1997	Hero No. 1
1997	Banarasi Babu
1997	Zameer: The Awakening of a Soul
1997	Aur Pyaar Ho Gaya
1997	Mr. and Mrs. Khiladi
1997	Aflatoon
1997	Jeeo Shaan Se
1998	Bade Miyan Chote Miyan
1999	Aa Ab Laut Chalen
1999	Biwi No.1
1999	Haseena Maan Jaayegi
2000	Dulhan Hum Le Jayenge
2000	Chal Mere Bhai
2000	Kunwara
2000	Har Dil Jo Pyar Karega
2001	Jodi No. 1
2001	Mujhe Kucch Kehna Hai
2002	Tumko Na Bhool Paayenge
2002	Hum Kisise Kum Nahin
2002	Yeh Hai Jalwa
2002	Om Jai Jagadish
2002	Jeena Sirf Merre Liye
2003	Chalte Chalte
2004	Mujhse Shaadi Karogi
2005	Priyasakhi
2005	Vaada
2005	Maine Pyaar Kyun Kiya
2005	Barsaat
2005	Dosti: Friends Forever
2006	Shaadi Karke Phas Gaya Yaar
2008	Mehbooba
2008	God Tussi Great Ho
2008	Golmaal Returns
2011	Chatur Singh Two Star
2012	Gali Gali Chor Hai
2018	Do Chehre
2020	Coolie No. 1
2021	Chehre
2021	The Last Show

=== As director ===
Year	Title
2008	God Tussi Great Ho
2009	Life Partner
2012	Gali Gali Chor Hai
2021	Chehre

=== As lyricist ===
Year	Title	Notes
2021	Chehre	2 songs - "Chehre - Title Track" and "Chehre - Title Track" (Reprise)
