= Tum Mere Ho =

- Poster
- Directed by: Tahir Hussain
- Screenplay by: Tahir Hussain; M. Kaleem Rahi
- Story by: Tahir Hussain; Surinder Singh
- Produced by: Tahir Hussain
- Starring: Aamir Khan; Juhi Chawla
- Cinematography: N.V. Srinivas; Noor Mohammad
- Music by: Anand–Milind
- Production company: Tahir Hussain Enterprises
- Release date: 25 May 1990
- Running time: 129 minutes
- Country: India
- Language: Hindi

Tum Mere Ho (English: You Are Mine) is a 1990 Indian fantasy action film starring Aamir Khan, Juhi Chawla and Kalpana Iyer in negative role as an ichhadhari nagin. It was directed by Aamir Khan's father Tahir Hussain. Although the film was a disaster at the box-office, over the years it has gained cult status for being so bad it's good.

== Plot summary ==
Shiva is blessed with magical snake-charming powers. When he meets Paro from a nearby village, he falls in love with her. She is also attracted to him. But Paro's father, Choudhry Charanjit Singh, is not pleased with this match, and he hires men to subdue and kill Shiva, all in vain. Little to Shiva's knowledge, during his childhood, his father had attacked and killed a shape-shifting snake in order to fulfill his greed, earning the wrath of the snake's powerful mother, who had promised to exact revenge. Shiva is bitten and believed to be deceased; His family lovingly sends his body afloat a river, which was discovered by Shiva's adoptive father and revived.

He was then brought back to life with the help of black magic and adopted by Baba, who also teaches him about black magic. Their town has a ritual where on naag panchami, whoever kidnaps a girl and takes her to his house can marry them.

== Cast ==
- Aamir Khan as Shiva
- Juhi Chawla as Paro
- Ishrat Ali
- Ajit Vachani as Choudhry Charanjit Singh (Paro's Father)
- Sudhir Pandey as Thakur Choudhary
- Kalpana Iyer as Mother Snake
- Menka Patel as Poonam
- Nissar Khan
- Anirudh Agarwal

== Soundtrack ==
Tum Mere Ho

Soundtrack album by Anand–Milind
- Released: 1990
- Venue: Mumbai
- Studio: Mehboob
- Genre: Feature film soundtrack
- Length: 32:19
- Language: Hindi
- Labels: Tips Cassettes & Records
- Producer: Anand–Milind

Anand–Milind chronology
Taqdeer Ka Tamasha (1990)	Tum Mere Ho (1990)	Zahreelay (1990)

The music of the film was composed Anand–Milind and the lyrics were penned by Majrooh Sultanpuri.

Vocals for Khan were supplied by his then-frequent collaborator Udit Narayan. The album also features Anuradha Paudwal, Anupama Deshpande and Sadhna Sargam.

#	Title	Singer(s)
1	"Maine Daba Li Thi"	Anuradha Paudwal
2	"Sheesha Chahe Toot Bhi Jaaye"	Udit Narayan
3	"Jatan Chahe Jo Karle"	Udit Narayan, Sadhana Sargam
4	"Jatan Chahe Jo Karle" v2	Udit Narayan, Sadhana Sargam
5	"Tum Mere Ho"	Udit Narayan, Anupama Deshpande
6	"Tum Mere Ho" v2	Udit Narayan
7	"Tum Mere Ho" v3	Udit Narayan, Anupama Deshpande
