= Neryosang Dhaval =

Neryosang Dhaval was a Zoroastrian (Parsi) priest from Sanjan in Gujarat who is known for translating prominent Zoroastrian works in Middle Persian into Sanskrit. Neryosang has been assigned by Mary Boyce to the late 11th-early 12th century AD while M. N. Dhalla assigns him to the 13th century AD. Boyce remarks that "his work shows him to have had an admirable extensive knowledge of both Sanskrit and Middle Persian" and that it "marked one of the peaks of Parsi scholarship".
