= Chinar: Daastaan-E-Ishq =

- Chinar Daastaan-E-Ishq movie poster
- Directed by: Sharique Minhaj
- Written by: Farooq Renzu Shah
- Screenplay by: Mohsin Khan; Sahar Quaze; Sahar Quaze (dialogues)
- Based on: Kashmir Jheel Jalti Hai by Farooq Renzu Shah
- Produced by: Rajesh R Jain
- Cinematography: Jigar
- Edited by: Nitesh Rai
- Music by: Salim Sen; Siddique Sen
- Production company: Shagun Films Private Limited
- Release date: 16 October 2015
- Running time: 115 Minutes
- Country: India
- Language: Hindi

Chinar: Daastaan-E-Ishq (transl. Poplar: A story of love) is a 2015 Indian Hindi-language romantic drama film directed by Sharique Minhaj and produced by Rajesh R Jain. It is based on the Urdu novel Kashmir Jheel Jalti Hai by Srinagar-based writer Farooq Renzu Shah which is based on the Kashmir conflict.

== Cast ==
- Faisal Khan as Jamaal
- Inayat Sharma as Surriya
- Dalip Tahil as Aziz Cinema Khan
- Pramod Moutho as Salaam
- Shahbaz Khan as Khwaja Sahab and others
- Parveen Kaur as Aziz Cinema Khan's wife

== Production ==
This film was shot in Kashmir and Mumbai.

== Soundtrack ==
The soundtrack for the album was composed by Salim Sen and Siddique Sen and lyrics was written by Jamil Ahmed.

No.	Title	Writer(s)	Singer(s)	Length
1.	"Mujhe Jeena Hai"	Jamil Ahmed	Ali Aslam, Aayushi Shah	3:53
2.	"Dil Ki Parton Pe"	Jamil Ahmed	Shahid Mallya	4:49
3.	"Alvida"	Jamil Ahmed	Zubeen Garg	5:26
Total length:				14:08
