= Homi Mobed =

Pakistani cricketer

Personal information
- Full name: Homi F. Mobed
- Born: 1928 or 1929
- Died: 14 April 2015 (aged 86); Karachi, Pakistan
- Batting: Right-handed
- Bowling: Right-arm leg-spin

Domestic team information
- Years: Team
- 1956-57 to 1957-58: Karachi

Career statistics
Competition	First-class
Matches	7
Runs scored	179
Batting average	35.80
100s/50s	0/2
Top score	96
Balls bowled	480
Wickets	8
Bowling average	26.25
5 wickets in innings	0
10 wickets in match	0
Best bowling	3/14
Catches/stumpings	4/–
- Source: Cricinfo, 10 April 2019

Homi F. Mobed (1928 or 1929 – 14 April 2015) was a Pakistani cricketer who played seven matches of first-class cricket for Karachi teams between December 1956 and October 1957.

Mobed was an all-rounder: a right-handed batsman and leg-spin bowler. His most successful match was a semi-final of the Quaid-e-Azam Trophy in 1956-57, when he batted at number nine for Karachi Whites against Karachi Blues and made 96 in a team total of 762, and also took three wickets, helping Karachi Whites to an innings victory. A Parsi, he died of cardiac arrest at the Parsi General Hospital in Karachi on 14 April 2015, aged 86.

The first-class cricketer and umpire Minocher Mobed was a relative: either his father or his uncle.
