= Homi Mullan =

- Also known as: Homi Ji
- Born: Kolkata, India
- Origin: Mumbai, India
- Genres: Indian music; Bollywood music; Indian classical; Music arrangement and composition
- Occupations: Composer; Musician; Music Arranger; Music Director
- Instruments: Tabla; Dholak; Duggi; Madal; Bongos; Percussion; Accordion; Piano; Keyboard; Organ; Vibraphone
- Years active: 1960–1994

Homi Mullan (1940 - 2015) was an Indian percussionist born in Kolkata. He is widely recognised for his musical contributions to Bengali and Hindi films. Mullan worked with musical directors including S. D. Burman, Madan Mohan, Naushad, and R. D. Burman.

== Musical career ==
Homi Mullan commenced his musical career in Kolkata at a young age. Though Mullan is known as a percussionist, he was classically trained in the piano and the accordion while growing up in Kolkata. In Kolkata, Mullan was acquainted with musical director and singer Pankaj Mullick, who offered him a role as a percussionist in Bengali film productions.

Mullan worked with various other musicians including Sailesh Dasgupta, Shyamal Mitra, and Nachiketa Ghosh.

Mullan assisted R. D. Burman in introducing percussion to the Bollywood film industry.

Burman's direction and guidance saw percussion become a significant musical element in the Bollywood film industry today.

Mullan retired from the music industry after Burman's death in 1994.
