= Diwana =

Diwana may refer to:

== Places ==
=== Afghanistan ===
- Dīvāneh, Farah
- Dīvāneh, Kunduz

=== India ===
- Diwana, Panipat, a village in Haryana
  - Diwana railway station

=== Pakistan ===
- Diwana, Balochistan
- Diwana Tughal Khel

=== Australia ===
- A short-lived station on the Main Western railway line, New South Wales

== Films ==
- Diwana (1952 film), a 1952 Bollywood movie directed by Abdul Rashid Kardar
- Diwana (1967 film), a 1967 Bollywood film directed by Mahesh Kaul

== Other ==
- The feminine of Dewan, a Persian-language title used for a government minister or courtier in various Islamic governments

== See also ==
- Deewana (disambiguation)
- Diwan (disambiguation)
