= List of Hindi songs recorded by Udit Narayan =

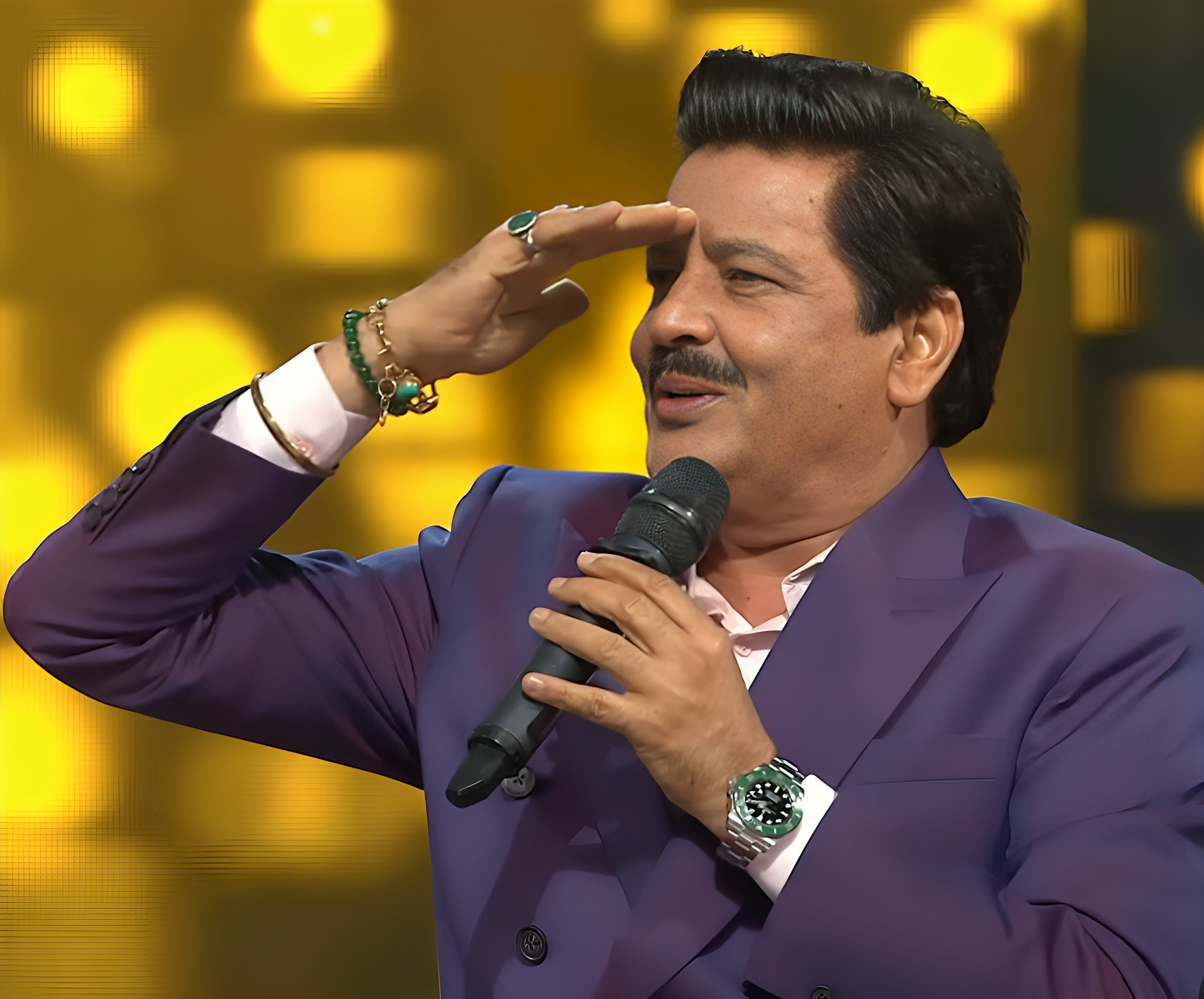
Narayan in 2024

This is an alphabetical list of Hindi songs performed by Udit Narayan from 1980 to date. He has sung over 25000 songs over 36 languages. Over 2000 songs are listed here.

== 1980s ==
=== 1980 ===
Film	Song	Composer(s)	Writer(s)	Co-artist(s)
Unees Bees	"Mil Gaya, Mil Gaya"	Rajesh Roshan	Amit Khanna	Mohammed Rafi, Usha Mangeshkar

=== 1981 ===
Film	Song	Composer(s)	Writer(s)	Co-artist(s)
Gehra Zakham	"Chael Mein Maal Leje Aaya Hai"	R D Burman	Vittalbhai Patel	Asha Bhosle, Mohammed Rafi, Anand Kumar C.
Sannata	"Sun Jaane Jaa"	Rajesh Roshan	Majrooh Sultanpuri	Alka Yagnik
Sannata	"Superman Superman"	Rajesh Roshan	Majrooh Sultanpuri	Alka Yagnik, Ursula Vaz

=== 1982 ===
Film	Song	Composer(s)	Writer(s)	Co-artist(s)
Swami Dada	"Koi Dharti Par"	R D Burman	Anjaan	solo

=== 1983 ===
Film	Song	Composer(s)	Writer(s)	Co-artist(s)
Aao Pyaar Karen	"Shivji Ke Chele, Chale Albele"	Manas Mukherjee	Yogesh	Kavita Krishnamurthy, Aarti Mukherjee, Yunus
Bade Dilwala	"Jeevan Ke Din Chhote Sahi" (version 1)	R D Burman	Majrooh Sultanpuri	Baby Preeti
Bade Dilwala	"Jeevan Ke Din Chhote Sahi" (version 2)	R D Burman	Majrooh Sultanpuri	
Kehdo Pyaar Hai	"Bindiya Tum Humse Kehdo Pyaar Hai"	Bappi Lahiri	Indeevar	Kishore Kumar, Suresh Wadkar
Ghungroo	"Jo Safar Pyaar Se"	Kalyanji-Anandji	Prakash Mehra	Alka Yagnik
Paanch Khiladi	"Gaaoon Main Tarane Jhoom Ke Sada"	Ranjit Gazmer	Aish Kanwal	Poornima
Paanch Khiladi	"Hum Hain Paanch Khiladi"	Ranjit Gazmer	Manhar Udhas, Farooq Kadri, Fansuk	
Sun Meri Laila	"Sun Le Meri Laila" (version 1)	Raam Laxman	Ravinder Rawal	solo
Sun Meri Laila	"Sun Le Meri Laila" (version 2)	Raam Laxman	Ravinder Rawal	solo

=== 1984 ===
Film	Song	Composer(s)	Writer(s)	Co-artist(s)
Ab Ayega Mazaa	"440 Volt Ki Ladki"	Anand–Milind	Sameer	Pankaj Mitra
Apna Bhi Koi Hota	"Duniya Se Insaon Ka"	Chitragupt	S. H. Bihari	solo
Chakma	"Chehra Chhupa Liya"	Bappi Lahiri	Anand Bakshi	Shailendra Singh, Sulakshana Pandit, Chandrani Mukherjee
Hup Hip Hurray	"Hip Hup Hurray Ho"	Vanraj Bhatia	Gulzar	Asha Bhosle, Shailendra Singh
Mohabbat Ka Masihaa	"Jab Se Dekha Hai Tumhen"	Usha Khanna	Nida Fazli	solo
Yeh Desh	"Dekhna Dekhna, Dekhte Dekhte Kuch Ho Jayega"	R D Burman	Anand Bakshi	Shailendra Singh, Shakti Thakur, Kumar Sanu

=== 1985 ===
Film	Song	Composer(s)	Writer(s)	Co-artist(s)
Karishma Kudrat Kaa	"Kahin Tu Woh To Nahin"	Kalyanji–Anandji	Anjaan	Sadhana Sargam

=== 1986 ===
Film	Song	Composer(s)	Writer(s)	Co-artist(s)
Anadi Khiladi	"Yeh Hai Bambai Pagle"	Raam Laxman	Abhilash	Vinod Sehgal, Ashok Khosla
Patton Ki Bazi	"Mora Saiyan, Na Pakde Baiyan"	Anup Jalota	Maya Govind	Asha Bhosle
Tan-Badan	"Meri Nayi Bansi Ki Dhun"	Anand–Milind	Sameer	solo

=== 1987 ===
Film	Song	Composer(s)	Writer(s)	Co-artist(s)
Jhanjhaar	"Dekh Khudara Haal Hamara"	Kalyanji–Anandji	Vishwamitra Adil	solo
Jhanjhaar	"Dekh Khudara Haal Hamara" (excerpt)	Kalyanji–Anandji	Vishwamitra Adil	solo
Jhanjhaar	"Dekh Khudara Haal Hamara" (sad)	Kalyanji–Anandji	Vishwamitra Adil	solo
Maa Beti	"Baaje Badhaai More Angana"	Anand–Milind	Anjaan	Suresh Wadkar
Param Dharam	"Parody"	Bappi Lahiri	Anjaan	Narendra Bhansali, Chandrani Mukherjee

=== 1988 ===
Film	Song	Composer(s)	Writer(s)	Co-artist(s)
Ganga Tere Desh Mein	"O Janiya, O Janiya, O Janiya"	Laxmikant–Pyarelal	Anand Bakshi	Anuradha Paudwal
Mera Shikaar	"Mohabbat Jo Usne Banayi Na Hoti"	Bappi Lahiri	Indeevar	solo
Nal Damyanti	"Prabhuji Ajab Tihari Maya"	Pradeep Lad	Kamlakar Datey	solo
Nal Damyanti	"Kalyug Teri Ajab Karamat"	Pradeep Lad	Kamlakar Datey	solo
Pyar Ka Mandir	"Log Jahan Par Rehte Hai"	Laxmikant–Pyarelal	Anand Bakshi	Kavita Krishnamurthy, Mohammed Aziz, Suresh Wadkar
Qayamat Se Qayamat Tak	"Gazab Ka Hin Din"	Anand–Milind	Majrooh Sultanpuri	Alka Yagnik
Qayamat Se Qayamat Tak	"Akele Hain To Kya Ghum Hai"	Anand–Milind	Majrooh Sultanpuri	Alka Yagnik
Qayamat Se Qayamat Tak	"Ae Mere Humsafar"	Anand–Milind	Majrooh Sultanpuri	Alka Yagnik
Qayamat Se Qayamat Tak	"Papa Kehte Hain"	Anand–Milind	Majrooh Sultanpuri	solo
Ram-Avtar	"Na Na Karte"	Laxmikant–Pyarelal	Anand Bakshi	Mohammed Aziz, Anuradha Paudwal
Rihaee	"Dilli Mein Mera Dil Na Laga"	Sharang Dev	Suraj Sanim, Babu Ranpura	Kavita Krishnamurthy

=== 1989 ===
Film	Song	Composer(s)	Writer(s)	Co-artist(s)
Aag Se Khelenge	"Chhede Been Sapera Naache Naagan Kali"	R D Burman	Anand Bakshi	Asha Bhosle, Amit Kumar, Kavita Krishnamurthy
Ab Meri Baari	"Mujhko Hai Maloom"	Anand–Milind	Sameer	Alka Yagnik
Apna Desh Paraye Log	"Mishri Ki Daali Hai Roop Tera"	Usha Khanna	Armaan Shahabi	Anuradha Paudwal
Asmaan Se Ooncha	"Zindagi Se Jab Mile Ajnabi"	Rajesh Roshan	Indeevar	Kumar Sanu, Anwar, Sadhana Sargam
Gentleman	"Taar Hilne Laagi"	Bappi Lahiri	Anjaan	Shubha Joshi
Ghar Ka Chiraag	"Aye Kash Tum Kahdo Kabhi"	Bappi Lahiri	Anjaan	Alka Yagnik
Ghar Ka Chiraag	"Aye Kash Tum Kahdo Kabhi" (Sad)	Bappi Lahiri	Anjaan	Alka Yagnik
Hum Bhi Insaan Hain	"Sun Le O Daata"	Bappi Lahiri	Indeevar	Anuradha Paudwal
Khuli Khidki	"Palat Palat Palat"	Usha Khanna	Kulwant Jani, Yogesh	Sarika Kapoor
Lal Dupatta Malmal Ka	"Na Jaane Kyun Main Bekaraar"	Anand–Milind	Majrooh Sultanpuri	Anuradha Paudwal
Lal Dupatta Malmal Ka	"Kya Karte The Sajna"	Anand–Milind	Majrooh Sultanpuri	Anuradha Paudwal
Lashkar	"Swaarg Se Pyara Hai Apna Chhota Sa Ghar"	Nadeem–Shravan	Anwar Sagar	Mohammed Aziz, Kavita Krishnamurthy, Sarika Kapoor
Main Tera Dushman	"Baaje Mera Bichhua"	Laxmikant–Pyarelal	Sameer	Anuradha Paudwal
Mutthi Bhar Zameen	"Yeh Pyaar Ki Pehli Nazar"	Amar–Utpal	Anand Bakshi	Anupama Deshpande
Na-Insaafi	"Ram Laxman Ki Jodi"	Bappi Lahiri	Anjaan	Nitin Mukesh
Sindoor Aur Bandook	"Tera Pyaar Mujhe"	Ajay Swamy	Gauhar Kanpuri, Yogesh	Alka Yagnik
Tasveer	"Sohni O Meri Sohno"	Aroon Paresh	Kavi Ratan	Jayshree Shivram
Tasveer	"Tasveer Teri Man Mein"	Aroon Paresh	Kavi Ratan	solo
Tridev	"Oye Oye"	Kalyanji–Anandji	Anjaan	Amit Kumar, Jolly Mukherjee

== 1990s ==
=== 1990 ===
Film	Song	Composer(s)	Writer(s)	Co-artist(s)
Aaj Ke Shahenshah	"Haiya Re Haiya"	Bappi Lahiri	Anjaan	Alka Yagnik, Shabbir Kumar
Aandhiyan	"Duniya Mein Tere Siva"	Bappi Lahiri	Anjaan	Anuradha Paudwal
Aandhiyan	"Ole Ole"	Bappi Lahiri	Anjaan	Anuradha Paudwal
Aashiqui	"Mera Dil Tere Liye"	Nadeem–Shravan	Sameer	Anuradha Paudwal
Agneekaal	"Pankhida O Pankhida"	Pankaj Bhatt	Shyam Raj	Asha Bhosle, Tinnu Anand
Awaragardi	"Rahegi Rahegi Yeh Dosti"	Bappi Lahiri	Anjaan	Kumar Sanu, Sarika Kapoor
Awaragardi	"Mara Re Mara, Kya Mara Re"	Bappi Lahiri	Anjaan	Chandrani Mukherjee, Sudesh Bhosle
Awwal Number	"Yeh Hai Cricket"	Bappi Lahiri	Amit Khanna	Bappi Lahiri, Amit Kumar
Awwal Number	"Lakhon Mein, Nigahon Mein Koi"	Bappi Lahiri	Amit Khanna	Bappi Lahiri, S. Janaki
Baap Numbri Beta Dus Numbri	"Mohabbat Humne Ki Hai"	Nadeem–Shravan	Sameer	Anuradha Paudwal
Danga Fasaad	"Kho Gaya Woh Zamana"	Dhiraj Kumar	Abhilash	solo
Deewana Mujh Sa Nahin	"Main Sehra Bandh Ke"	Anand–Milind	Sameer	solo
Deewana Mujh Sa Nahin	"Deewana Mujh Sa Nahin"	Anand–Milind	Sameer	solo
Deewana Mujh Sa Nahin	"Khadi Raho Baith Jao"	Anand–Milind	Sameer	Sadhana Sargam
Dil	"Mujhe Neend Na Aaye"	Anand–Milind	Sameer	Anuradha Paudwal
Dil	"Hum Pyaar Karne Wale"	Anand–Milind	Sameer	Anuradha Paudwal
Dil	"Dam Dama Dam"	Anand–Milind	Sameer	Anuradha Paudwal
Dil	"Humne Ghar Chhoda Hai	Anand–Milind	Sameer	Sadhana Sargam
Dil	"Khambe Jaisi Khadi Hai"	Anand–Milind	Sameer	solo
Jawani Zindabad	"Main Tujhe Dekhta Raha"	Anand–Milind	Sameer	Sadhana Sargam
Jawani Zindabad	"Shor Shor"	Anand–Milind	Verma Malik	solo
Kafan	"Yeh Tune Nahi"	Anand–Milind	Sameer	Alka Yagnik
Kasam Dhande Ki	"Mehlon Ka Dulha"	Vijay	Khalid	Amit Kumar, Anuradha Paudwal, Vijayta Pandit
Kasam Jhoot Ki	"Yeh Dil Tera Deewana"	Jeetu–Tapan	Kulwant Jani, Hasrat Jaipuri	solo
Maha-Sangram	"I Love You" (happy)	Anand–Milind	Sameer	Alka Yagnik, Mohammed Aziz, Jolly Mukherjee, Anand
Maha-Sangram	"Aaya Main Aaya"	Anand–Milind	Sameer	Amit Kumar
Nache Nagin Gali Gali	"Tum Kya Aaye, Duniya Badal Gayi"	Kalyanji–Anandji	Anjaan	Sadhana Sargam
Phir Lehraya Lal Dupatta	"Na Jaane Kyun Main Beqaraar"	Anand–Milind	Majrooh Sultanpuri	Anuradha Paudwal
Phir Lehraya Lal Dupatta	"Kya Karte The Sajna"	Anand–Milind	Majrooh Sultanpuri	Anuradha Paudwal
Pyar Ka Toofan	"Gali Gali Dware Dware"	Kalyanji–Anandji	Anwar Sagar	Sadhana Sargam
Shaitani Ilaaka	"Dooba Dooba"	Bappi Lahiri	Anjaan	Alka Yagnik, Sudesh Bhosle
Shiva	"Botany Chhodenge, Matinee Dekhenge"	Ilaiyaraaja	Majrooh Sultanpuri	S. Janaki, Suresh Wadkar, Sunil, Franco
Sindoor Ki Awaaz	"Daale Aankhon Mein Aankhen"	Rajesh Roshan	Indeevar	Sadhana Sargam
Solah Satra	"Main Karta Hoon Tumse Pyar"	Nadeem–Shravan	Saeed Rahi	solo
Solah Satra	"Jab Se Tujhe Dekha"	Nadeem–Shravan	Saeed Rahi	solo
Taqdeer Ka Tamasha	"Aaja Mere Paas Aa, Main Jo Gaaoon Tu Bhi Gaa"	Anand–Milind	Sameer	solo
Tum Mere Ho	"Jatan Chahe Jo Karle"	Anand–Milind	Majrooh Sultanpuri	Sadhana Sargam
Tum Mere Ho	"Jatan Chahe Jo Karle" (version 2)	Anand–Milind	Majrooh Sultanpuri	Sadhana Sargam
Tum Mere Ho	"Tum Mere Ho"	Anand–Milind	Majrooh Sultanpuri	Anupama Deshpande
Tum Mere Ho	"Tum Mere Ho" (version 3)	Anand–Milind	Majrooh Sultanpuri	Anupama Deshpande
Tum Mere Ho	"Tum Mere Ho" (version 2)	Anand–Milind	Majrooh Sultanpuri	solo
Tum Mere Ho	"Sheesha Chahe Toot Bhi Jaaye"	Anand–Milind	Majrooh Sultanpuri	solo

=== 1991 ===
Film	Song	Composer(s)	Writer(s)	Co-artist(s)
Anjaane Rishte	"Sixty Ka Mard, Solah Ki Janani"	Anand–Milind	Majrooh Sultanpuri	Jolly Mukherjee
Anjaane Rishte	"Ashiqon Ka Naam"	Anand–Milind	Majrooh Sultanpuri	Alka Yagnik
Ayee Milan Ki Raat	"Mat Ro Mere Dil"	Anand–Milind	Majrooh Sultanpuri	Anuradha Paudwal
Ayee Milan Ki Raat	"Maine Kisi Ko Dil De Diya"	Anand–Milind	Sameer	Anuradha Paudwal
Afsana Pyar Ka	"Afsana Pyar Ka"	Bappi Lahiri	Anjaan	Asha Bhosle
Anjaane Rishte	"Aashiqon Ka Naam Aur Ooncha"	Anand–Milind	Majrooh Sultanpuri	Anuradha Paudwal
Anjaane Rishte	"Saath Ka Marad"	Anand–Milind	Majrooh Sultanpuri	Jolly Mukherjee
Baharon Ki Manzil	"Teraa Naam Likh Diyaa"	Raam Laxman	Ravinder Rawal	Poornima
Baharon Ki Manzil	"O My Sweet Heart Dil Se Dil Ko Jod De"	Raam Laxman	Dev Kohli	Poornima
Baharon Ki Manzil	"Meri Jaan Duaa Karna"	Raam Laxman	Dev Kohli	Poornima
Baharon Ki Manzil	"Sabse Badi Dosti"	Raam Laxman	Dev Kohli	Poornima, Kumar Sanu
Baharon Ki Manzil	"Tak Dhin Tak Dhin"	Raam Laxman	Dev Kohli	Kumar Sanu, Suresh Wadkar
Bhabhi	"Achchaji Ab Hum To"	Anu Malik	Dev Kohli	Alka Yagnik
Bijli Aur Toofan	"Jab Se Hui Main Aatrah Baras Ki"	Anwar–Usman	Dilip Tahir	Anuradha Paudwal
Dalpati	"Aayi Holi Manwa Dole"	Ilaiyaraaja	P. K. Mishra	Abhijeet Bhattacharya
Ghar Parivar	"Hum Garibon Ko Agar"	Kalyanji-Anandji	Anjaan	Alka Yagnik
Ghar Parivar	"Kurte Ka Kya Hai"	Kalyanji-Anandji	Anjaan	Amit Kumar, Sadhana Sargam, Sonali Bajpayee
Hum	"Ek Doosre Se, Karte Hain Pyaar Hum"	Laxmikant-Pyarelal	Anand Bakshi	Mohammed Aziz, Alka Yagnik, Sudesh Bhosle, Sonali Vajpaee
Kurbaan	"Yeh Dharti Chand Sitare"	Anand–Milind	Sameer	Anuradha Paudwal
Majboor Ladki	"Yeh Vaada Ho, Vaada Raha Mere Yaar"	Kishore Singh	Sameer	Anuradha Paudwal
Mohabbat Pehli Nazar Mein	"Chhoti Si Bagiya Mein"	Munawar Ali	Aish Kanwal	Kavita Krishnamurthy
Mohabbat Pehli Nazar Mein	"Chhoti Si Bagiya Mein" (sad)	Munawar Ali	Aish Kanwal	Kavita Krishnamurthy
Nachnewale Gaanewale	"Hero Se Milne Heroine Aayi"	Bappi Lahiri	Mahendra Dalvi	Anuradha Paudwal, Vijay Benedict
Narasimha	"Humse Tum Dosti Kar Lo"	Laxmikant-Pyarelal	Anand Bakshi	Alka Yagnik
Pehli Mohabbat	"Mera Deewanapan"	Kanak Raj	Faaiz Anwar	Alka Yagnik
Phool Aur Kaante	"I Love You"	Nadeem–Shravan	Sameer	Alisha Chinai
Prem Jung	"Attack Attack"	Hamsalekha	Sameer	Abhijeet Bhattacharya
Prem Jung	"Pyaar Hua, Jaane Do"	Hamsalekha	Sameer	Kavita Krishnamurthy
Princess from Kathmandu	"Main Hoon Kader Khan"	Ravindra Jain	Ravindra Jain	Amit Kumar
Pyar Bhara Dil	"Ban Ke Kitaab Teri, Tere Seene Se Lipta Rahoonga"	Nikhil–Vinay	Yogesh	Anuradha Paudwal
Pyar Bhara Dil	"Dil Dil Pyaar Bhara Dil"	Nikhil–Vinay	Yogesh	Anuradha Paudwal
Ramwati	"Chhum Chhum Baaje Paayal"	Usha Khanna	Dilip Tahir	Anuradha Paudwal
Saathi	"Har Ghadi Bekhudi"	Nadeem–Shravan	Sameer	Anuradha Paudwal
Sau Crore	"Desi Dhun Bideshi Taal"	Bappi Lahiri	Suraj Sanim	Asha Bhosle, Kumar Sanu
Saudagar	"Imli Ka Boota" (version 3)	Laxmikant–Pyarelal	Anand Bakshi	Sadhana Sargam, Priya Mayekar, Vivek Verma
Saugandh	"Meri Neend Chura Kar Le Gaye"	Anand–Milind	Sameer	Anuradha Paudwal
Swaarg Yahan Narak Yahan	"Khushiyan Aayi"	Rajesh Roshan	Indeevar	Alka Yagnik, Mangal Singh, Nitin Mukesh
Yaara Dildara	"Bin Tere Sanam"	Jatin - Lalit	Majrooh Sultanpuri	Kavita Krishnamurthy
Yaara Dildara	"Woh Jo Kaha Tha Maine"	Jatin - Lalit	Majrooh Sultanpuri	Kavita Krishnamurthy
Yaara Dildara	"Bin Tere Sanam" [Remix]	Jatin - Lalit	Majrooh Sultanpuri	Kavita Krishnamurthy
Yaara Dildara	"Tum Hi Hamari Ho Manzil, My Love"	Jatin - Lalit	Majrooh Sultanpuri	Anuradha Paudwal
Yaara Dildara	"Ab Toh Tumhen Hai Dikhana"	Jatin - Lalit	Shahrukh Mirza	Abhijeet Bhattacharya
Yeh Hai Ghar Ki Mahabharat	"Dil Kahoon Ki Dilbar Kahoon" (version 1)	Rajesh Roshan	Anjaan	Anuradha Paudwal
Yeh Hai Ghar Ki Mahabharat	"Dil Kahoon Ki Dilbar Kahoon" (version 2)	Rajesh Roshan	Anjaan	Anuradha Paudwal

=== 1992 ===
Film	Song	Composer(s)	Writer(s)	Co-artist(s)
Apradhi	"Jaldi Se Kanyadaan"	Laxmikant-Pyarelal	Anand Bakshi	solo
Apradhi	"Dheere Dheere Chal"	Laxmikant-Pyarelal	Anand Bakshi	solo
Beta	"Dhak Dhak Karne Laga"	Anand-Milind	Sameer	Anuradha Paudwal
Beta	"Saiyan Se Chhup Ke"	Anand-Milind	Sameer	Anuradha Paudwal
Beta	"Koyal Si Teri Boli"	Anand-Milind	Sameer	Anuradha Paudwal
Beta	"Bhool To Maa Se"	Anand-Milind	Sameer	solo
Deedar	"Deedar Ho Gaya"	Anand-Milind	Sameer	solo
Deedar	"Kya Dharti Kya Aasman"	Anand-Milind	Sameer	solo
Deedar	"Hum Apni Mohabbat Ka"	Anand-Milind	Sameer	solo
Deedar	"Din Ba Din Mohabbat"	Anand-Milind	Sameer	Sadhana Sargam
Deedar	"Tera Mera Mera Tera"	Anand-Milind	Sameer	Sadhana Sargam
Deedar	"Ab To Kahin Tere Bin"	Anand-Milind	Sameer	Sadhana Sargam
Ganga Ka Vachan	"Mera Neend Kahin"	Nikhil-Vinay	Yogesh	Alka Yagnik
Ganga Ka Vachan	"Dhum Dhum"	Nikhil-Vinay	Yogesh	solo
Ganga Ka Vachan	"Dharti Tujh Par"	Nikhil-Vinay	Sami Malik	solo
Ganga Ka Vachan	"Dilbar Janiya"	Nikhil-Vinay	Rani Malik	solo
Honeymoon	"Tu Neendon Ki Rani"	Anand-Milind	Majrooh Sultanpuri	Anuradha Paudwal
Jaan Tere Naam	"In the Morning"	Nadeem-Shravan	Sameer	Kumar Sanu, Alka Yagnik
Jaan Tere Naam	"Kal College Bandh Ho Jaayega" (happy)	Nadeem-Shravan	Sameer	Sadhana Sargam
Jaan Tere Naam	"Kal College Bandh Ho Jaayega" (sad)	Nadeem-Shravan	Sameer	solo
Jigar	"Tujhko Bahon Bhar Liya"	Anand-Milind	Sameer	Sadhana Sargam
Jigar	"Mere Dil Ko Karar Aa Jaye"	Anand-Milind	Sameer	Sadhana Sargam
Jo Jeeta Wohi Sikandar	"Yahan Ke Hum Sikandar"	Jatin-Lalit	Majrooh Sultanpuri	Sadhana Sargam, Jatin-Lalit
Jo Jeeta Wohi Sikandar	"Pehla Nasha"	Jatin-Lalit	Majrooh Sultanpuri	Sadhana Sargam
Jo Jeeta Wohi Sikandar	"Shehar Ki Pariyon"	Jatin-Lalit	Majrooh Sultanpuri	Sadhana Sargam
Jo Jeeta Wohi Sikandar	"Are Yaaro Mere Pyaro"	Jatin-Lalit	Majrooh Sultanpuri	Vijayta Pandit
Khiladi	"Khud Ko Kya Samajhti Hai"	Jatin-Lalit	Shyam Raj	Abhijeet, Kavita Krishnamurthy, Sapna Mukherjee
Khiladi	"Hum Yaar Hain Yaaron Ke"	Jatin-Lalit	Mahendra Dehlvi	Abhijeet
Khiladi	"Hoke Man Aaj Magan"	Jatin-Lalit	Mahendra Dehlvi	Asha Bhosle, Abhijeet
Laat Saab	"Churaya Tune Dil Mera"	Anu Malik	Guslhan Bawra	Alka Yagnik
Meera Ka Mohan	"Rab Jaisa Roop Tumhara"	Arun Paudwal	Indeevar	Anuradha Paudwal
Muskurahat	"Phool Ki Patta Sa"	Raam Laxman	Suraj Sanim	Alka Yagnik
Muskurahat	"Apni Jeb Mein"	Raam Laxman	Suraj Sanim	Kavita Krishnamurthy, M. G. Sreekumar
Muskurahat	"Apne Dil Mein"	Raam Laxman	Suraj Sanim	solo
Prem Deewane	"Mohabbat Zindabad"	Laxmikant-Pyarelal	Anand Bakshi	Alka Yagnik, Kavita Krishnamurthy, Mohammad Aziz
Prem Deewane	"Pi Pi Pi Piya"	Laxmikant-Pyarelal	Anand Bakshi	Alka Yagnik
Prem Deewane	"Aise Lagi Aag Barabar"	Laxmikant-Pyarelal	Anand Bakshi	Alka Yagnik
Prem Deewane	"Happy Birthday To You"	Laxmikant-Pyarelal	Anand Bakshi	Amit Kumar, Sadhana Sargam, Jolly Mukherjee
Phoolwati	"Piya Tune Mera Jiya"	Raam Laxman		Alka Yagnik
Phoolwati	"Aisa Lagi Aag"	Raam Laxman		Alka Yagnik
Vishwatma	"Aankhon Mein Hai Kya"	Viju Shah	Anand Bakshi	Sadhana Sargam, Alka Yagnik, Mohammad Aziz
Vishwatma	"Dil Le Gayi Teri Bindiya"	Viju Shah	Anand Bakshi	Mohammed Aziz, Sapna Mukherjee, Amit Kumar
Vishwatma	"Saat Samundar" (Part 1)	Viju Shah	Anand Bakshi	solo
Vishwatma	"Saat Samundar" (Part 3)	Viju Shah	Anand Bakshi	Jolly Mukherjee
Yalgaar	"Aakhir Tumhen Aana Hai"	Channi Singh	Sudarshan Faakir	Sapna Mukherjee
Yalgaar	"Teri Chunni Pe Sitare"	Channi Singh	Sudarshan Faakir	Kavita Krishnamurthy
Yalgaar	"Kaun Si Baat Hai"	Channi Singh	Sudarshan Faakir	Kavita Krishnamurthy
Yalgaar	"Koi Pechle Janam Kiye"	Channi Singh	Sudarshan Faakir	Kavita Krishnamurthy

=== 1993 ===
Film	Song	Composer(s)	Writer(s)	Co-artist(s)
Aashiq Awara	"Maine Pyar Kar Liya"	Laxmikant-Pyarelal	Anand Bakshi	Alka Yagnik
Aashiq Awara	"Aaj Abhi Isi Waqt"	Laxmikant-Pyarelal	Anand Bakshi	Alka Yagnik
Aashiq Awara	"Main Hoon Aashiq"	Laxmikant-Pyarelal	Anand Bakshi	solo
Aashiq Awara	"O Sanam Tere Aashik Hain Hum"	Laxmikant-Pyarelal	Anand Bakshi	solo
Aye Meri Bekhudi	"Aye Meri Bekhudi"	Anil Mohile	Rajesh Johri	Anuradha Paudwal
Aye Meri Bekhudi	"Main Hoon Zameen Tu Aasmaan"	Anil Mohile	Indeevar	Anuradha Paudwal
Aye Meri Bekhudi	"Chodke Saara Jahan"	Anil Mohile	Indeevar	Anuradha Paudwal
Chor Aur Chand	"Janam Janam Tumko Sanam"	Nikhil-Vinay	Yogesh	Anuradha Paudwal
Dalaal	"Mar Gaye Mar Gaye"	Bappi Lahiri	Prakash Mehra	Alka Yagnik
Darr	"Jaadu Teri Nazar"	Shiv-Hari	Anand bakshi	solo
Darr	"Tu Mere Samne"	Shiv-Hari	Anand bakshi	Lata Mangeshkar
Dil Hai Betaab	"Pehle Pyar Ki Pehli"	Laxmikant–Pyarelal	Sameer	Kavita Krishnamurthy
Dil Hai Betaab	"Har Pal Mere Hothon Par"	Laxmikant–Pyarelal	Sameer	Kavita Krishnamurthy
Dil Hai Betaab	"Aao Chalo Bhag Chalen"	Laxmikant–Pyarelal	Sameer	Alka Yagnik
Dil Hai Betaab	"Kya Tumhe Pata Hai"	Laxmikant–Pyarelal	Sameer	solo
Dil Ki Baazi	"Mujhe Sardi Lag Gayee"	Raam Laxman	Ravinder Rawal	Alka Yagnik
Dil Ki Baazi	"Ruk Bhi Jaao Jaana"	Raam Laxman	Shaily Shailendra	Lata Mangeshkar
Hasti	"Meri Kasam Teri Kasam"	Anand-Milind	Sameer	Anuradha Paudwal
Hasti	"Aage Se Peechhe Se"	Anand-Milind	Sameer	Abhijeet, Mukul Aggarwal
Hasti	"Hissa Hai Tu Meri"	Anand-Milind	Sameer	solo
Pehchaan	"Nazuk Nazuk Nazuk"	Anand–Milind	Sameer	Alka Yagnik
Platform	"Main Shama Tu Parwana"	Anand–Milind	Sameer	Alka Yagnik
Platform	"Na Pyaar Kiye, Na Iqraar Kiye"	Anand–Milind	Sameer	Sadhana Sargam
Rang	"Hum Tum Picture"	Nadeem-Shravan	Sameer	Alka Yagnik
Santaan	"College Mein Honi Chahiye"	Anand–Milind	Sameer	Alka Yagnik
Waqt Hamara Hai	"Kami Nahin Hai Ladkiyon Ki"	Nadeem-Shravan	Sameer	Alka Yagnik, Vinod Rathod, Mitalee Choudhary
Waqt Hamara Hai	"Mausam Hai Mastana"	Nadeem-Shravan	Sameer	Alka Yagnik

=== 1994 ===
Film	Song	Composer(s)	Writer(s)	Co-artist(s)
Aatish: Feel the Fire	"Baarish Ne Aag Lagayi"	Nadeem-Shravan	Sameer	Alka Yagnik
Anjaam	"Tu Samne Jab"	Anand–Milind	Sameer	Alka Yagnik
Brahma	"Chehre Padh Leta Hai"	Bappi Lahiri		Alka Yagnik
Dilwale	"Mauka Milega To Hum"	Nadeem-Shravan	Sameer	Alka Yagnik
Deewana Sanam	"Gori O Gori Tum Ho"	Nikhil-Vinay	Yogesh	solo
Dulaara	"Kal Kahin College Mein"	Nikhil-Vinay		Alka Yagnik
Dulaara	"Silsila Shuru Hua"	Nikhil-Vinay		Alka Yagnik
Ekka Raja Rani	"Yeh Neeli Neeli Chudiyan"	Nadeem-Shravan	Sameer	Alka Yagnik
Ekka Raja Rani	"Pyar Karo To"	Nadeem-Shravan	Sameer	Kumar Sanu, Alka Yagnik
Hum Aapke Hain Koun..!	"Dhiktana" (Part-2)	Raamlaxman	Ravinder Rawal	Lata Mangeshkar, S. P. Balasubrahmanyam
Jane Tamanna	"Piya Piya O Piya"	Aadesh Shrivastava	Shyam Raj	Ranjana Joglekar
Kaadhalan (D)	"Premika Ne Pyar Se"	A.R. Rahman	P. K. Mishra	S. P. Balasubrahmanyam, S. P. Pallavi
Laadla	"Meri Dhadkan Suno"	Anu Malik		Alka Yagnik
Laadla	"Mere Ghulam Tera" (duet)	Anu Malik		Alka Yagnik
Laadla	"Maa O Meri Maa"	Anand–Milind	Sameer	Jyotsna Hardikar
Main Tera Aashiq	"Dupatta Tera Kale Rang Da"	Nikhil-Vinay	Yogesh	Anuradha Paudwal
Mohabbat Ki Aarzoo	"Kyon Humko Neend Nahin Aati"	Laxmikant-Pyarelal	Rani Malik	Alka Yagnik
Mohabbat Ki Aarzoo	"Tum Humse Pyaar Kar Lo"	Laxmikant-Pyarelal	Kulwant Jani	Alka Yagnik
Mohabbat Ki Aarzoo	"Tum Humse Pyaar Kar Lo" (part 2)	Laxmikant-Pyarelal	Kulwant Jani	Alka Yagnik
Mohini	"Hi Handsome, Hey Deadly"	Ravindra Jain	Ravindra Jain	Alisha Chinai
Mohra	"Tip Tip Barsa Paani"	Viju Shah	Anand Bakshi	Alka Yagnik
Mohra	"Tu Cheez Badi Hai Mast"	Viju Shah	Anand Bakshi	Kavita Krishnamurthy
Mohra	"Subah Se Lekar Shaam Tak"	Viju Shah	Anand Bakshi	Sadhana Sargam
Mr. Azaad	"Kali Kali Tu Anarkali"	Bappi Lahiri	Indeevar	Kavita Krishnamurthy
Pehla Pehla Pyar	"Mujhse Pyar Karegi"	Anand–Milind	Anand Bakshi	Alka Yagnik
Raat Ke Gunaah	"Duniya Se Chup Chupke"	Anand–Milind	Maya Govind	Alka Yagnik
Suhaag	"Main Dekhun Tumhe"	Anand–Milind		Alka Yagnik
Suhaag	"Kagaz Kalam"	Anand–Milind		Alka Yagnik
Suhaag	"Gore Gore Mukhde Pe"	Anand–Milind		Alka Yagnik
Suhaag	"Yeh Nakhra Ladki Ka"	Anand–Milind		Kumar Sanu, Alka Yagnik
Yaar Gaddar	"Mere Dil Mein Hai Kuchh"	Anu Malik	Pooja Ahuja	Alka Yagnik
Yaar Gaddar	"Tum Jaoge Jab"	Anu Malik	Pooja Ahuja	solo
Yaar Gaddar	"Rat Song"	Anu Malik	Dev Kohli	solo
Yeh Dillagi	"Lagi Lagi Hai"	Sammer Sen-Dilip Sen	Sameer	Lata Mangeshkar, Abhijeet
Yeh Dillagi	"Gori Kalai"	Sammer Sen-Dilip Sen	Sameer	Lata Mangeshkar
Main Khiladi Tu Anari	"Main Khiladi Tu Anari"	Anu Malik	Maya Govind	Abhijeet Bhattacharya

=== 1995 ===
Film	Song	Composer(s)	Writer(s)	Co-artist(s)
Akele Hum Akele Tum	"Raja Ko Rani Se"	Anu Malik	Majrooh Sultanpuri	Alka Yagnik
Akele Hum Akele Tum	"Aisa Zakhm Diya Hai"	Anu Malik	Majrooh Sultanpuri	Shankar Mahadevan, Aamir Khan
Akele Hum Akele Tum	"Akele Hum Akele Tum"	Anu Malik	Majrooh Sultanpuri	Aditya Narayan
Bewafa Sanam	"O Dil Tod Ke Hansti"	Nikhil-Vinay	Yogesh	solo
Chahat	"Mohabbat Mein Jeena"	Shyam-Surender	N/A	Anuradha Paudwal
Chahat	"Na Dil Ko Chain Hai"	Shyam-Surender	N/A	Anuradha Paudwal
Dilwale Dulhania Le Jayenge	"Mehndi Laga Ke Rakhna"	Jatin–Lalit	Anand Bakshi	Lata Mangeshkar
Dilwale Dulhania Le Jayenge	"Ho Gaya Hai Tujhko"	Jatin–Lalit	Anand Bakshi	Lata Mangeshkar
Dilwale Dulhania Le Jayenge	"Ruk Jaa, O Dil Deewane"	Jatin–Lalit	Anand Bakshi	solo
Raja	"Phool Mangoo Naa Bahaar"	Nadeem-Shravan	Sameer	Alka Yagnik
Raja	"Akhiyaan Milaoon Kabhi"	Nadeem-Shravan	Sameer	Alka Yagnik
Raja	"Kisi Din Banoongi Main Raja"	Nadeem-Shravan	Sameer	Alka Yagnik
Raja	"Nazrein Mili Dil Dhadka"	Nadeem-Shravan	Sameer	Alka Yagnik
Raja	"Ja Sajna Tujhko Bhula"	Nadeem-Shravan	Sameer	Alka Yagnik
Raja	"Aankh Teri Chhalke To"	Nadeem-Shravan	Sameer	Alka Yagnik
Raja	"Aankh Milate Darr Lagta"	Nadeem-Shravan	Sameer	Alka Yagnik
Raja	"Chot Lage Tujhko"	Nadeem-Shravan	Sameer	Alka Yagnik
Raja	"Tumne Agar Pyar Se"	Nadeem-Shravan	Sameer	solo
Ram Jaane	"Ram Jaane"	Anu Malik	Anand Bakshi	Sonu Nigam, Alka Yagnik
Ram Jaane	"Chori Chori O Gori"	Anu Malik	Anand Bakshi	Sadhana Sargam
Ram Jaane	"Bum Chiki Chiki Bum"	Anu Malik	Anand Bakshi	Sadhana Sargam, Abhijeet
Ram Jaane	"Ram Jaane" (Sad)	Anu Malik	Anand Bakshi	solo
Ram Jaane	"Ala La La Long"	Anu Malik	Anand Bakshi	solo
Rangeela	"Yaaro Sun Lo Zara"	A. R. Rahman	Mehboob Kotwal	K. S. Chithra
Rangeela	"Kya Kare Kya Na Kare"	A. R. Rahman	Mehboob Kotwal	solo
Yaraana	"Rabbi Re Ralli"	Anu Malik	Rahat Indori	Kavita Krishnamurthy
Yaraana	"Jadu Jadu Jadu"	Anu Malik	Rani Malik	Sapna Mukherjee
Zamaana Deewana	"O Rabba"	Nadeem-Shravan	Sameer	Sapna Awasthi

=== 1996 ===
Film	Song	Composer(s)	Writer(s)	Co-artist(s)
Agni Prem	"Jaan Banke Rahenge"	Bappi Lahiri	Anwar Sagar	Kavita Krishnamurthy
Ajay	"Pan Khake Jana"	Anand–Milind	Sameer	Jolly Mukherjee, Alka Yagnik
Angaara	"Gore Gore Gal Wali"	Dilip Sen-Sameer Sen	Nawab Arzoo	Sadhana Sargam
Angaara	"Aara Hile Chhapra Hile"	Dilip Sen-Sameer Sen	Maya Govind	Alka Yagnik
Apne Dam Par	"Mujhe Is Tarah Se"	Aadesh Shrivastava	Anwar Sagar	Sadhana Sargam
Apne Dam Par	"Dil Deewana Sanam"	Aadesh Shrivastava	Shyam Raj	Sapna Mukherjee
Army	"Achikoo Bachikoo"	Anand-Milind	Sameer	Sadhana Sargam, Aditya Narayan
Bal Bramhachari	"Ram Dhun Gaao Kripal Dhun Gaao"	Bappi Lahiri	Prakash Mehra	solo
Bambai Ka Babu	"Ham Nikal Pade"	Anand-Milind	Sameer	Kumar Sanu, Alka Yagnik, Bela Sulakhe
Bambai Ka Babu	"Tham Zara"	Anand-Milind	Sameer	Kumar Sanu
Bandish	"Na Mili Kahin"	Anand-Milind	Sameer	Sapna Mukherjee, Jolly Mukherjee, Arun Ingle
Bandish	"Teetar Teetar"	Anand-Milind	Sameer	Poornima
Beqabu	"Beqabu Ho Gaya"	Anu Malik	Nida Fazli	Alka Yagnik
Beqabu	"Tu Woh Tu Hai"	Anu Malik	Nida Fazli	Alka Yagnik
Beqabu	"Yaariyan Yaariyan"	Anu Malik	Maya Govind	Alka Yagnik
Beqabu	"Chun Liya Maine Tujhe"	Anu Malik	Maya Govind	Alka Yagnik
Beqabu	"Dil Mera Chalte Chalte"	Anu Malik	Maya Govind	Alka Yagnik
Bhairavi	"Kuch Is Tarah"	Laxmikant-Pyarelal	Amit Khanna	Kavita Krishnamurthy
Bhairavi	"Oh Balam Kesaria"	Laxmikant-Pyarelal	Amit Khanna	Kavita Krishnamurthy
Bhishma	"Chahe Jaan Jaye"	Dilip Sen-Sameer Sen	Anand Bakshi	Kavita Krishnamurthy
Bhishma	"Dil Jo Lagaye"	Dilip Sen-Sameer Sen	Anand Bakshi	Kavita Krishnamurthy
Bhishma	"Kya Nahin Kiya"	Dilip Sen-Sameer Sen	Anand Bakshi	Alka Yagnik
Bhishma	"O Soni O Soni"	Dilip Sen-Sameer Sen	Anand Bakshi	solo
Chaahat	"Nahin Jeena Yaar Bina"	Anu Malik	Dev Kohli	Kavita Krishnamurthy
Chaahat	"Nahin Lagta"	Anu Malik	Nida Fazli	Alka Yagnik
Dastak	"Jadoo Bhari"	Rajesh Roshan	Javed Akhtar	solo
Dastak	"Milne Se Pehlay"	Rajesh Roshan	Javed Akhtar	Preeti Singh
Diljale	"Ho Nahi Sakta"	Anu Malik	Javed Akhtar	solo
Diljale	"Kuch Tum Beheko"	Anu Malik	Javed Akhtar	Alka Yagnik
Fareb	"Pyaar Ka Milna"	Jatin–Lalit	Indeevar	Abhijeet Bhattacharya
Fareb	"O Humsafar, Dil Ke Nagar" (duet)	Jatin–Lalit	Neeraj	Alka Yagnik
Jaan	"Hum Aise Karenge Pyar"	Anand-Milind	Anand Bakshi	Sadhana Sargam
Jaan	"Rab Se Sajan Se"	Anand-Milind	Anand Bakshi	Alka Yagnik
Jaan	"Beiman Piya Re"	Anand-Milind	Anand Bakshi	Alka Yagnik
Jaan	"Jaan Gayee Dil Aaya"	Anand-Milind	Anand Bakshi	Alka Yagnik, Anand Bakshi
Jeet	"Saanson Ka Chalna"	Nadeem-Shravan	Sameer	Alka Yagnik
Jeet	"Saajan Ghar Aana"	Nadeem-Shravan	Sameer	Alka Yagnik
Khamoshi: The Musical	"Jana Suno Hum Tum"	Jatin-Lalit	Majrooh Sultanpuri	solo
Khamoshi: The Musical	"Saagar Kinare Do Dil"	Jatin-Lalit	Majrooh Sultanpuri	Sulakshana Pandit
Love Birds	"Come On, Come On"	A. R. Rahman	P. K. Mishra	solo
Papa Kahte Hain	"Ghar Se Nikalte Hi"	Rajesh Roshan	Javed Akhtar	solo
Phool Bane Patthar	"Main Jab Sochta Hoon Tumhein"	Shyam-Surender	Faaiz Anwar	Anuradha Paudwal
Phool Bane Patthar	"Mujhe Teri Adaon Ne"	Shyam-Surender	Nawab Arzoo	Anuradha Paudwal
Raja Hindustani	"Pardesi Pardesi"	Nadeem-Shravan	Sameer	Alka Yagnik, Sapna Awasthi
Raja Hindustani	"Kitna Pyara Tujhe Rab Ne Banaya"	Nadeem-Shravan	Sameer	Alka Yagnik
Raja Hindustani	"Aaye Ho Meri Zindagi Mein" (male)	Nadeem-Shravan	Sameer	solo
Rajkumar	"Paayal Meri Jaadu"	Laxmikant-Pyarelal	Anand Bakshi	Alka Yagnik
Rajkumar	"Bechain Hoon Main"	Laxmikant-Pyarelal	Anand Bakshi	Alka Yagnik
Rajkumar	"Tu Bijali Hain"	Laxmikant-Pyarelal	Anand Bakshi	solo
Saajan Chale Sasural	"Ram Narayan Baaja Bajata"	Nadeem-Shravan	Sameer	solo
Saajan Chale Sasural	"Doob Ke Dariya Mein"	Nadeem-Shravan	Sameer	Poornima

=== 1997 ===
Film	Song	Composer(s)	Writer(s)	Co-artist(s)
Aflatoon	"Oye Oye Teri Si Ladki"	Sameer Sen-Dilip Sen	Anand Bakshi	Anuradha Paudwal
Aur Pyaar Ho Gaya	"Meri Sanson Mein"	Nusrat Fateh Ali Khan	Javed Akhtar	solo
Aur Pyaar Ho Gaya	"Sitara Aankhen"	Nusrat Fateh Ali Khan	Javed Akhtar	solo
Aur Pyaar Ho Gaya	"Jagi Huyi Fizaeein"	Nusrat Fateh Ali Khan	Javed Akhtar	Asha Bhosle
Aur Pyaar Ho Gaya	"Koi Jane Koi Na Jane"	Nusrat Fateh Ali Khan	Javed Akhtar	Nusrat Fateh Ali Khan, Anuradha Paudwal
Aur Pyaar Ho Gaya	"Uttar Dakshin"	Nusrat Fateh Ali Khan	Javed Akhtar	Alka Yagnik
Deewana Mastana	"O Mummy Mummy"	Laxmikant-Pyarelal	Anand Bakshi	solo
Deewana Mastana	"Head Ya Tail"	Laxmikant-Pyarelal	Anand Bakshi	Vinod Rathod, Kavita Krishnamurthy
Deewana Mastana	"Tere Bina Dil"	Laxmikant-Pyarelal	Anand Bakshi	Alka Yagnik, Vinod Rathod
Dil To Pagal Hai	"Dil to Pagal Hai"	Uttam Singh	Anand Bakshi	Lata Mangeshkar
Dil To Pagal Hai	"Bholi Si Surat"	Uttam Singh	Anand Bakshi	Lata Mangeshkar
Dil To Pagal Hai	"Are Re Are"	Uttam Singh	Anand Bakshi	Lata Mangeshkar
Dil To Pagal Hai	"Dholna"	Uttam Singh	Anand Bakshi	Lata Mangeshkar
Dil To Pagal Hai	"Pyar Kar"	Uttam Singh	Anand Bakshi	Lata Mangeshkar
Dil To Pagal Hai	"Koi Ladki Hai"	Uttam Singh	Anand Bakshi	Lata Mangeshkar
Dil To Pagal Hai	"Le Gayi"(extended film version)	Uttam Singh	Anand Bakshi	Asha Bhosle
Gupt: The Hidden Truth	"Duniya Haseeno Ka Mela"	Viju Shah	Anand Bakshi	Suneeta Rao
Gupt: The Hidden Truth	"Mushkil Bada Yeh Pyaar Hai"	Viju Shah	Anand Bakshi	Alka Yagnik
Gupt: The Hidden Truth	"Mere Sanam"	Viju Shah	Anand Bakshi	Sadhana Sargam
Hero No. 1	"Sona Kitna Sona Hai"	Anand-Milind	Sameer	Poornima
Hero No. 1	"Mohabbat Ki Nahin Jaati"	Anand-Milind	Sameer	Sadhana Sargam
Ishq	"Neend Churai Meri"	Anu Malik	Rahat Indori	Kumar Sanu, Alka Yagnik & Kavita Krishnamurthy
Ishq	"Dekho Dekho Jaanam"	Anu Malik	Rahat Indori	Alka Yagnik
Ishq	"Mr. Lova Lova" (Ankhiyaan Tu Mila Le)	Anu Malik	Dev Kohli	Abhijeet Bhattacharya, Sudesh Bhosle, Kavita Krishnamurthy, Poornima
Ishq	"Ishq Hua... Kaise Hua"	Anu Malik	Javed Akhtar	Udit Narayan, Vibha Sharma
Ishq	"Tu Jhootha"	Anu Malik	Javed Akhtar	Alka Yagnik, Abhijeet Bhattacharya, Sadhna Sargam
Koyla	"Ghunghte Mein Chanda"	Rajesh Roshan	Indeevar	solo
Mr. and Mrs. Khiladi	"Akela Hai Mr. Khiladi"	Anu Malik	Dev Kohli	Anuradha Paudwal
Mr. and Mrs. Khiladi	"Jara Parde Peh Ane De"	Anu Malik	Dev Kohli	Poornima
Mr. and Mrs. Khiladi	"Tu Kya Bangala Banaayega"	Anu Malik	Dev Kohli	Alka Yagnik
Pardes	"Nahin Hona Tha"	Nadeem-Shravan	Anand Bakshi	Alka Yagnik, Hema Sardesai, Sabri Brothers
Prithvi	"Jis Ghadi Tujhko"	Viju Shah	Jalees Sherwani	Sadhana Sargam
Prithvi	"Mera Dil De Diya"	Viju Shah	Nitin Raikwar	Kavita Krishnamurthy
Prithvi	"Een Meen Sade Teen"	Viju Shah	Nitin Raikwar	Alka Yagnik
Prithvi	"Chand Aadhi Raat Mein"	Sukhwinder Singh	Azeez Jalandhar	Anuradha Paudwal
Salma Pe Dil Aa Gaya	"Salma Pe Dil Aa Gaya"	Aadesh Shrivastava	Shyam Raj	Asha Bhosle, Amit Kumar
Salma Pe Dil Aa Gaya	"Jara Dholki Bajao"	Aadesh Shrivastava	Saawan Kumar	Asha Bhosle
Virasat	"Dhol Bajne Laga"	Anu Malik	Javed Akhtar	Kavita Krishnamurthy
Yes Boss	"Choodi Baji Hai"	Jatin-Lalit	Javed Akhtar	Alka Yagnik

=== 1998 ===
Film	Song	Composer(s)	Writer(s)	Co-artist(s)
Bandhan	"Tere Naina Mere Naino Ki","Chhora Phisal Gaya"	Anand Raj Anand, Himesh Reshammiya		Kavita Krishnamurthy
Ghulam	"Ab Naam Mohabbat Ke","Saath Jo Tera Mil Gaya","Tujhko Kya"	Jatin-Lalit	Sameer, Indeevar	Alka Yagnik, Surjit Bindrakhia, JoJo,
Pyaar To Hona Hi Tha	"Ajnabi Mujhko Itna Bata","Aashiq Hoon Main"	Jatin-Lalit	Sameer	Asha Bhosle
Bade Miyan Chote Miyan	"Bade Miyan To Bade Miyan"	Viju Shah	Sameer	Sudesh Bhosale, Rakesh Pandit, Poonam Bhatia
Bade Miyan Chote Miyan	"Makhna"	Viju Shah	Sameer	Alka Yagnik, Amit Kumar
Bade Miyan Chote Miyan	"Deta Jai Jo Re" (Part I)	Viju Shah	Sameer	Anuradha Paudwal, Kavita Krishnamurthy, Amit Kumar
Bade Miyan Chote Miyan	"Deta Jai Jo Re" (Part II)	Viju Shah	Sameer	Alka Yagnik, Sudesh Bhosale, Kavita Krishnamurthy
Bade Miyan Chote Miyan	"Kisi Disco Mein Jaaye"	Viju Shah	Sameer	Alka Yagnik
Bade Miyan Chote Miyan	"Assi Chutki Nabbe Taal" (Part I)	Viju Shah	Sameer	Sudesh Bhosale
Bade Miyan Chote Miyan	"Assi Chutki Nabbe Taal" (Part II)	Viju Shah	Sameer	Sudesh Bhosale
Dil Se..	"Ae Ajnabi, Tu Bhi Kabhi Awaaz De"	A. R. Rahman	Mehboob	Mahalaxmi Iyer
Dulhe Raja	"Ladka Deewana Lage"	Anand-Milind	Sameer	Anuradha Paudwal
Duplicate	"Mere Mehboob Mere Sanam"	Anu Malik	Javed Akhtar	Alka Yagnik
Duplicate	"Tum Nahin Jaana"	Anu Malik	Javed Akhtar	Alka Yagnik, Shankar Mahadevan
Dushman	"Aawaz Do Hamko" (Happy)	Uttam Singh	Anand Bakshi	Lata Mangeshkar
Dushman	"Aawaz Do Hamko" (Sad)	Uttam Singh	Anand Bakshi	Lata Mangeshkar
Jab Pyaar Kisise Hota Hai	"Is Dil Mein Kya Hai"	Jatin-Lalit	Sameer	Lata Mangeshkar
Jeans	"Hai Rabba"	A. R. Rahman	Javed Akhtar	Kavita Krishnamurthy
Kuch Kuch Hota Hai	"Kuch Kuch Hota Hai"	Jatin–Lalit	Sameer	Alka Yagnik
Kuch Kuch Hota Hai	"Yeh Ladka Hai Deewaana"	Jatin–Lalit	Sameer	Alka Yagnik
Kuch Kuch Hota Hai	"Koi Mil Gaya"	Jatin–Lalit	Sameer	Alka Yagnik, Kavita Krishnamurthy
Kuch Kuch Hota Hai	"Tujhe Yaad Na Meri Aayi"	Jatin–Lalit	Sameer	Alka Yagnik, Manpreet Akhtar
Maharaja	"Maharaja (Main Tera Deewana)"	Nadeem-Shravan	Sameer	Kavita Krishnamurthy
Major Saab	"Pyar Kiya To Nibhana"	Anand Raaj Anand	Anand Raaj Anand	Anuradha Paudwal
Major Saab	"Pyar Kiya To Nibhana" (part-2)	Anand Raaj Anand	Anand Raaj Anand	Anuradha Paudwal
Major Saab	"Akeli Na Bazaar Jaya Karo"	Anand Raaj Anand	Anand Raaj Anand	solo
Pyaar Kiya To Darna Kya	"Deewana Main Chala"	Jatin-Lalit	Sameer	solo
Pyaar Kiya To Darna Kya	"Chhad Zid Karna"	Jatin-Lalit	Sameer	Anuradha Paudwal
Pyaar Kiya To Darna Kya	"Oh Baby"	Jatin-Lalit	Sameer	Kavita Krishnamurthy

=== 1999 ===
Film	Song	Composer(s)	Writer(s)	Co-artist(s)
Aa Ab Laut Chalen	"Aa Ab Laut Chalen"	Nadeem-Shravan	Sameer	Alka Yagnik
Aa Ab Laut Chalen	"Yehi Hai Pyar"	Nadeem-Shravan	Sameer	Alka Yagnik, Jaspinder Narula
Aa Ab Laut Chalen	"Tere Bin Ek Pal"	Nadeem-Shravan	Sameer	Jaspinder Narula
Aarzoo	"Main Aa Rahan Hoon"	Anu Malik	Anand Bakshi	solo
Aarzoo	"Tu Soni Kudi"	Anu Malik	Anand Bakshi	Anu Malik
Daag	"Pardesiya Itna Bata"	Rajesh Roshan	Sameer	Anuradha Paudwal
Daag	"Pyar Hamein Pyar Tum"	Rajesh Roshan	Sameer	Alka Yagnik
Dahek	"Jab Se Tumhein Maine"	Aadesh Shrivastava	Shyam Raj	Anuradha Paudwal
Dahek	"Ho Gori Aaja"	Aadesh Shrivastava	Dev Kohli	Vinod Rathod, Alka Yagnik, Sunidhi Chauhan
Dahek	"Kaha Kare Koiee"	Anand-Milind	Majrooh Sultanpuri	Sadhana Sargam
Hogi Pyaar Ki Jeet	"Dil Deewana Kehta Hai"	Anand-Milind	Sameer	solo
Hogi Pyaar Ki Jeet	"Karlo Karlo Mera Aitbar"	Anand-Milind	Sameer	solo
Hogi Pyaar Ki Jeet	"Kaun Hai Woh"	Anand-Milind	Sameer	Hema Sardesai
Hogi Pyaar Ki Jeet	"Lakhon Aashiq Mar Jaate"	Anand-Milind	Sameer	Abhijeet Bhattacharya, Alka Yagnik, Jaspinder Narula
Hum Dil De Chuke Sanam	"Chand Chhupa Badal Mein"	Ismail Darbar	Mehboob	Alka Yagnik
Hum Saath-Saath Hain	"ABCDEFGHI…I Love You"	Raamlaxman	Mitali Shashank	Hariharan, Shankar Mahadevan, Hema Sardesai
Hum Saath-Saath Hain	"Chhote Chhote Bhaiyon"	Raamlaxman	Dev Kohli	Kumar Sanu, Kavita Krishnamurthy
Hum Saath-Saath Hain	"Sunoji Dulhan"	Raamlaxman	Ravinder Rawal	Roopkumar Rathod, Kavita Krishnamurthy, Pratima Rao, Sonu Nigam
Hum Saath-Saath Hain	"Hum Saath Saath Hain"	Raamlaxman	Dev Kohli	Kavita Krishnamurthy, Anuradha Paudwal, Hariharan, Kumar Sanu, Alka Yagnik
Hum Saath-Saath Hain	"Mhare Hiwda Mein"	Raamlaxman	Ravi Kiran	Kavita Krishnamurthy, Anuradha Paudwal, Hariharan, Kumar Sanu, Alka Yagnik
Jaanwar	"Tujhko Na Dekhun"	Anand-Milind	Sameer	Sunidhi Chauhan
Jaanwar	"Kasam Se"	Anand-Milind	Sameer	Alka Yagnik
Mann	"Nasha Yeh Pyar Ka"	Sanjeev-Darshan	Sameer	solo
Mann	"Kehna Hai Tumse"	Sanjeev-Darshan	Sameer	Hema Sardesai
Mann	"Mera Mann"	Sanjeev-Darshan	Sameer	Alka Yagnik
Mann	"Tinak Tin Tana"	Sanjeev-Darshan	Sameer	Alka Yagnik
Mann	"Chaha Hai Tujhko"	Sanjeev-Darshan	Sameer	Anuradha Paudwal
Mann	"Kyon Chupate Ho"	Sanjeev-Darshan	Sameer	Anuradha Paudwal
Mann	"Khushiyan Aur Gham"	Sanjeev-Darshan	Sameer	Anuradha Paudwal
Mann	"Kali Nagin Ke Jaisi"	Sanjeev-Darshan	Sameer	Kavita Krishnamurthy
Taal	"Taal Se Taal Mila"	A. R. Rahman	Anand Bakshi	Alka Yagnik

== 2000s ==
=== 2000 ===
Film	Song	Composer(s)	Writer(s)	Co-artist(s)
Dhadkan	"Dil Ne Yeh Kaha Hai"	Nadeem-Shravan	Sameer	Alka Yagnik, Kumar Sanu
Dhadkan	"Na Na Karte Pyar"	Nadeem-Shravan	Sameer	Alka Yagnik
Fiza	"Aaja Mahiya"	Anu Malik	Gulzar	Alka Yagnik
Hadh Kar Di Aapne	"Hadh Kar Di Aapne"	Anand Raaj Anand	Anand Bakshi	Kavita Krishnamurthy
Hadh Kar Di Aapne	"Phir Toti Se Boli Maina"	Anand Raaj Anand	Anand Bakshi	Anuradha Paudwal, Vinod Rathod, Sudesh Bhosale, Anand Raaj Anand
Hadh Kar Di Aapne	"Mujhe Kuch Tumse Hai Kehna"	Anand Raaj Anand	Anand Bakshi	Vibha Sharma
Hamara Dil Aapke Paas Hai	"Hamara Dil Aapke Paas Hai"	Sanjeev-Darshan	Javed Akhtar	Alka Yagnik
Hamara Dil Aapke Paas Hai	"Shukriya Shukriya"	Sanjeev-Darshan	Javed Akhtar	Alka Yagnik
Hamara Dil Aapke Paas Hai	"Ghum Hai Kyon"	Sanjeev-Darshan	Javed Akhtar	solo
Kaho Naa... Pyaar Hai	"Kaho Na Pyaar Hai"	Rajesh Roshan	Saawan Kumar Tak	Alka Yagnik
Kaho Naa... Pyaar Hai	"Pyaar Ki Kashti Mein"	Rajesh Roshan	Saawan Kumar Tak	Alka Yagnik
Mission Kashmir	"Socho Ke Jheelon Ka"	Shankar-Ehsaan-Loy	Sameer	Alka Yagnik
Mission Kashmir	"Chupke Se Sun"	Shankar-Ehsaan-Loy	Sameer	Alka Yagnik
Mohabbatein	"Humko Humise Chura Lo"	Jatin-Lalit	Anand Bakshi	Lata Mangeshkar
Mohabbatein	"Zinda Rehti Hain Mohabbatein"	Jatin-Lalit	Anand Bakshi	Lata Mangeshkar
Mohabbatein	"Aankhein Khuli"	Jatin-Lalit	Anand Bakshi	Lata Mangeshkar, Udbhav, Manohar Shetty, Ishaan, Shweta Pandit, Sonali Bhatawdekar, Pritha Mazumdar, Shahrukh Khan
Mohabbatein	"Soni Soni"	Jatin-Lalit	Anand Bakshi	Jaspinder Narula, Udbhav, Manohar Shetty, Ishaan, Shweta Pandit, Sonali Bhatawdekar, Pritha Mazumdar
Refugee	"Raat Ki Hatheli Par"	Anu Malik	Javed Akhtar	Alka Yagnik
Har Dil Jo Pyar Karega	"Har Dil Jo Pyar Karega" (Title Track)	Anu Malik	Sameer	Alka Yagnik
Har Dil Jo Pyar Karega	"Dil Dil Dil Dewaana"	Anu Malik	Sameer	Alka Yagnik
Josh	"Hum To Dil Se Haare"	Anu Malik	Sameer	Alka Yagnik
Josh	"Hai Mera Dil"	Anu Malik	Sameer	Alka Yagnik

=== 2001 ===
Film	Song	Composer(s)	Writer(s)	Co-artist(s)
Dil Chahta Hai	"Jane Kyun Log Pyar Karte Hain"	Shankar–Ehsaan–Loy	Javed Akhtar	Alka Yagnik
Lagaan - Once Upon a Time in India	"Ghanan Ghanan","Mitwa","Radha Kaise Na Jale","O Rey Chhori","O Paalanhaare"	A.R. Rahman	Javed Akhter	Sukhwinder Singh, Alka Yagnik, Shankar Mahadevan, Shaan, Srinivas, Vaishali Samant, Vasundhara Das, Asha Bhosle, Lata Mangeshkar, Sadhana Sargam, Chorus
Indian	"Rab Di Kasam"	Anand Raj Anand	Anand Bakshi	Alka Yagnik
Gadar: Ek Prem Katha	"Udja Kale Kawan - Folk","Musafir Jaane Wale","Main Nikla Gaddi Leke","Udja Kale Kawan - Marriage","Hum Juda Ho Gaye","Udja Kale Kawan - Search"	Uttam Singh	Anand Bakshi	Alka Yagnik
Aashiq	"Gori Tera Nakhra"	Sanjeev–Darshan	Sameer	Alka Yagnik
Aashiq	"Teri Aankhon Mein"	Sanjeev–Darshan	Sameer	Alka Yagnik
Aashiq	"Tum Kya Jaano"	Sanjeev–Darshan	Sameer	Alka Yagnik
Aashiq	"Chhed Do"	Sanjeev–Darshan	Sameer	solo
Aashiq	"Charche Hain Hamare"	Sanjeev–Darshan	Sameer	solo
Aashiq	"O Mere Dholna"	Sanjeev–Darshan	Sameer	Anuradha Paudwal
Aashiq	"Mohabbat Ke Din"	Sanjeev–Darshan	Sameer	Anuradha Paudwal
Chingari Aur Sholay	"Gali Gali Mein Shor Hua"	Anand–Milind	Onkar Verma, Khalid	Anuradha Paudwal
Dil Churaya Apne	"O Sundari"	Suresh Wadkar	Dev Kohli	Kavita Krishnamurthy
Dil Churaya Apne	"Yeh Hai Mumbai Nagri"	Suresh Wadkar	Dev Kohli	Kavita Krishnamurthy
Dil Ne Phir Yaad Kiya	"Aaj Nachna"	Aadesh Shrivastava	Sameer	Alka Yagnik
Dil Ne Phir Yaad Kiya	"Kab Tak Yun Dil"	Aadesh Shrivastava	Sameer	Alka Yagnik
Dil Ne Phir Yaad Kiya	"Saare Shahar Mein"	Aadesh Shrivastava	Sameer	Lata Mangeshkar
Dulhan Dilwale Ki	"Dulhan Dilwale Ki"	Ramana Gogula	Deepak Choudhary	Preeti Uttam Singh
Ek Aur Jung	"Chand Utra Hai"	Omkar Rana	Sudhakar Sharma	Anupama Sawant
Ek Rishtaa	"Mohabbat Ne Mohabbat Ko"	Nadeem–Shravan	Sameer	Alka Yagnik
Farz	"Aelo Aelo Ji"	Uttam Singh	Sameer	Alka Yagnik
Farz	"Mohabbat Ke Din Ho"	Uttam Singh	Sameer	Alka Yagnik
Farz	"Dekhen Bhi To Kya Dekhen"	Uttam Singh	Sameer	Lata Mangeshkar
Jaan Pe Khelenge Hum	"Aiya Aiya"	Vaishnav Dev	Sudhakar Sharma	Hema Sardesai
Jaan Pe Khelenge Hum	"Jaadugari Teri Jaadugari"	Vaishnav Dev	N/A	Anuradha Paudwal
Jaan Pe Khelenge Hum	"Kyun Darti Ho Jaan-e-Tamanna"	Vaishnav Dev	N/A	Alka Yagnik
Jaan Pe Khelenge Hum	"Tere Hathon Mein"	Vaishnav Dev	N/A	Jaspinder Narula
Kabhi Khushi Kabhie Gham	"Bole Chudiyan"	Jatin–Lalit	Sameer	Kavita Krishnamurthy, Alka Yagnik, Sonu Nigam, Amit Kumar
Kabhi Khushi Kabhie Gham	"Yeh Ladka Haye Allah"	Jatin–Lalit	Sameer	Alka Yagnik
Kabhi Khushi Kabhie Gham	"Say Shava Shava"	Aadesh Shrivastava	Sameer	Alka Yagnik, Sunidhi Chauhan, Sudesh Bhonsle, Aadesh Shrivastava, Amitabh Bachchan
Tum Bin	"Tumhare Siva"	Nikhil-Vinay	Faaiz Anwar	Anuradha Paudwal
Vaishnovi Maa Ki Mahima	"Oonche Parvat Pe"	Surinder Kohli	P. K. Mishra	Anuradha Paudwal
Tera Mera Saath Rahen	"Pehli Nazar"	Anand Raj Anand	Sameer	Alka Yagnik
Tera Mera Saath Rahen	"Dil Wahi Bekaraar Hota Hai"	Anand Raj Anand	Sameer	Alka Yagnik
Tera Mera Saath Rahen	"Hanthon Ki Lakeeron Mein"	Anand Raj Anand	Sameer	Alka Yagnik
Tera Mera Saath Rahen	"Tadpati Hai Tarsati Hai"	Anand Raj Anand	Sameer	Alka Yagnik
Tera Mera Saath Rahen	"Tera Mera Saath Rahen - Male"	Anand Raj Anand	Sameer	Solo
Tera Mera Saath Rahen	"Tujh Se Bichad Ke"	Anand Raj Anand	Sameer	Solo

=== 2002 ===
Film	Song	Composer(s)	Writer(s)	Co-artist(s)
Deewangee	"Saat Suron Ka"	Ismail Darbar	Salim Bijnori	Kavita Krishnamurthy
Raaz	"Jo Bhi Kasmein","Kitna Pyaara Hai","Itna Main Chahoon (Not in the film)","Mujhe Tere Jaise (Not in the film)"	Nadeem-Shravaan	Sameer	Alka Yagnik
Humraaz	"Dil Ne Kar Liya","Tune Zindagi Mein – Male","Pyaar Kar"	Himesh Reshammiya		Alka Yagnik, Shaan, Kavita Krishnamurthy
Raaz	"Jo Bhi Kasmein","Kitna Pyaara Hai","Itna Main Chahoon (Not in the film)","Mujhe Tere Jaise (Not in the film)"	Nadeem-Shravaan	Sameer	Alka Yagnik
Karz: The Burden of Truth	"Shaam Bhi Khoob Hai"	Sanjeev–Darshan	Sameer	Kumar Sanu, Alka Yagnik
Love 2002	"Tumsa Haseen Maine Dekha Nahin" (version 2)	Ghulam Ali Chander	Suroor Lucknowi	Kavita Krishnamurthy
Love 2002	"Gore Mukhde Pe"	Ghulam Ali Chander	Suroor Lucknowi	solo
Kuch Dil Ne Kaha	"Main Tujhko Yaad Aaoonga"	Nikhil–Vinay	Anand Bakshi	Anuradha Paudwal
Kuch Dil Ne Kaha	"Mere Dil Pe Haath Rakh Do"	Nikhil–Vinay	Anand Bakshi	Anuradha Paudwal
Kuch Dil Ne Kaha	"Mere Sone Rab Ne"	Nikhil–Vinay	Anand Bakshi	Anuradha Paudwal
Kuch Dil Ne Kaha	"Meri Neend Chura Le"	Nikhil–Vinay	Anand Bakshi	solo
Kuch Dil Ne Kaha	"Meri Neend Chura Le" (sad)	Nikhil–Vinay	Anand Bakshi	solo
Kuch Dil Ne Kaha	"Sanu Tere Naal"	Nikhil–Vinay	Anand Bakshi	solo
Kuch Dil Ne Kaha	"Meri Nazar Ke Saamne"	Nikhil–Vinay	Anand Bakshi	solo
Kuch Dil Ne Kaha	"Neend Aati Hai"	Nikhil–Vinay	Anand Bakshi	solo
Kuch Dil Ne Kaha	"Main Tere Khwabon Mein"	Nikhil–Vinay	Anand Bakshi	solo
Rishtey	"Apna Bana Na Hai"	Sanjeev–Darshan	Abbas Katka	Anuradha Paudwal
Rishtey	"Tu Tu Dil Mein"	Sanjeev–Darshan	Abbas Katka	Anuradha Paudwal
Rishtey	"Rishta Tera Rishta Mera" (male)	Sanjeev–Darshan	Abbas Katka	solo
Rishtey	"Rishta Tera Rishta Mera" (version 3)	Sanjeev–Darshan	Abbas Katka	solo
Rishtey	"Deewana Deewana"	Sanjeev–Darshan	Abbas Katka	solo
Kyaa Dil Ne Kahaa	"Kyaa Dil Ne Kahaa"	Himesh Reshammiya	Sanjay Chhel	Alka Yagnik
Devdas	"Bairi Piya"	Ismail Darbar	Nusrat Badr	Shreya Goshal
Devdas	"Chalak Chalak"	Ismail Darbar	Nusrat Badr	Vinod Rathod, Shreya Goshal
Devdas	"Hamesha Tumko Chaha"	Ismail Darbar	Nusrat Badr	Kavita Krishnamurthy
Devdas	"Woh Chand Jaisi Ladki"	Ismail Darbar	Nusrat Badr	solo
Hum Tumhare Hain Sanam	"Hum Tumhare Hain Sanam"	Nikhil-Vinay	Sameer	Anuradha Paudwal
Hum Tumhare Hain Sanam	"Taaron Ka Chamakta"	Nadeem-Shravan	Sameer	Bali Brahmabhatt
Hum Tumhare Hain Sanam	""Aa Gaya Aa Gaya"	Nadeem-Shravan	Sameer	Solo
Jaani Dushman: Ek Anokhi Kahani	"Aaja Aaja"	Anand-Milind	Sameer	Alka Yagnik
Jaani Dushman: Ek Anokhi Kahani	"Zindagi Main Tujhpe"	Anand-Milind	Sameer	solo

=== 2003 ===
Film	Song	Composer(s)	Writer(s)	Co-artist(s)
Aanch	"Mera Dil Chura"	Sanjeev - Darshan	Abbas Katka	solo
Aapko Pehle Bhi Kahin Dekha Hai	"Aapko Pehle Bhi Kahin Dekha Hai"	Nikhil-Vinay	Sameer	Alka Yagnik
Aapko Pehle Bhi Kahin Dekha Hai	"Barsaat"	Nikhil-Vinay	Anand Bakshi	solo
Aapko Pehle Bhi Kahin Dekha Hai	"Kabhi Khann Khann"	Nikhil-Vinay	Nitin Raikwar	Alka Yagnik, S.P. Sailaja
Andaaz	"Aaj Kehna Zaroori Hai"	Nadeem - Shravan	Sameer	Alka Yagnik
Armaan	"Main Gaoon Tum Gao"	Shankar-Ehsaan-Loy	Javed Akhtar	Mahalaxmi Iyer, Shaan
Armaan	"Aao Milke Gaayen Aisa Gaana"	Shankar-Ehsaan-Loy	Javed Akhtar	Mahalaxmi Iyer, Shankar Mahadevan, Amitabh Bachchan
Baghban	"Hori Khele Raghuveera"	Aadesh Shrivastava	Sameer	Sukhwinder Singh, Alka Yagnik, Amitabh Bachchan
Baghban	"Om Jai Jagdish"	Aadesh Shrivastava	Sameer	Sneha Pant
Baghban	"Pehle Kabhi Na Mere Haal"	Aadesh Shrivastava	Sameer	Alka Yagnik
Chalte Chalte	"Prem Nagariya Ki"	Jatin-Lalit	Javed Akhtar	Alka Yagnik
Jism	"Mere Khwabon Ka"	M. M. Keeravani	Sayeed Quadri	solo
Kal Ho Naa Ho	"Maahi Ve"	Shankar-Ehsaan-Loy	Javed Akhtar	Sonu Nigam, Sadhana Sargam, Sujata Bhattacharya, Shankar Mahadevan
Khushi	"Jiya Maine Jiya"	Anu Malik	Sameer	Alka Yagnik
Koi... Mil Gaya	"Haila Haila"	Rajesh Roshan	Dev Kohli	Alka Yagnik
Koi... Mil Gaya	"Idhar Chala Main Udhar Chala"	Rajesh Roshan	Ibrahim Ashq	Alka Yagnik
Koi... Mil Gaya	"Jaadoo Jaadoo"	Rajesh Roshan	Ibrahim Ashq	Alka Yagnik
Koi... Mil Gaya	"Koi Mil Gaya"	Rajesh Roshan	Ibrahim Ashq	K. S. Chitra
Kuch Naa Kaho	"Achchi Lagti Ho"	Shankar-Ehsaan-Loy	Javed Akhtar	Kavita Krishnamurthy
Kuch Naa Kaho	"ABBG TPOG"	Shankar-Ehsaan-Loy	Javed Akhtar	Mahalaxmi Iyer
Paap	"Sun Ae Mere Dil"	Anu Malik	Sayeed Quadri	Anuradha Paudwal
Pinjar	"Shaaba Ni Shaaba"	Uttam Singh	Gulzar	Kavita Krishnamurthy, Sadhana Sargam
Tere Naam	"Odhni"	Himesh Reshammiya	Sameer	Alka Yagnik
Tere Naam	"Tere Naam"	Himesh Reshammiya	Sameer	Alka Yagnik
Tere Naam	"Tumse Milna"	Himesh Reshammiya	Sameer	Alka Yagnik
Tere Naam	"O Jaana"	Himesh Reshammiya	Sameer	Alka Yagnik, K.K., Shaan, Kamaal Khan
Tere Naam	"O Jaana" (remix)	Himesh Reshammiya	Sameer	Alka Yagnik, K.K., Shaan, Kamaal Khan
Tere Naam	"Chand"	Himesh Reshammiya	Sameer	solo
Tere Naam	"Kyun Kisi Ko"	Himesh Reshammiya	Sameer	solo
Tere Naam	"Tere Naam (Sad)"	Himesh Reshammiya	Sameer	solo
Tere Naam	"Tune Saath Jo Mera Chhoda" (sad)	Himesh Reshammiya		solo
Tere Naam	"Tune Saath Jo Mera Chhoda"	Sajid–Wajid	Jalees Sherwani	Raghav

=== 2004 ===
Film	Song	Composer(s)	Writer(s)	Co-artist(s)
Aabra Ka Daabra	"Chhutkan Gang"	Himesh Reshammiya	Sameer	solo
Aan: Men at Work	"Hamare Baad"	Anu Malik	Sameer	Shabbir Kumar, Sarika Kapoor, Ujwala
Ab... Bas! Now or Never	"Tere Chehre Pe" (version - I)	Daboo Malik	Sameer	Shreya Ghoshal
Ab... Bas! Now or Never	"Tere Chehre Pe" (version - II)	Daboo Malik	Sameer	Anuradha Paudwal
Ab Tumhare Hawale Watan Sathiyo	"Ab Tumhare Hawale Watan Sathiyo" (version - I)	Anu Malik	Sameer	Alka Yagnik, Sonu Nigam, Kailash Kher
Ab Tumhare Hawale Watan Sathiyo	"Ab Tumhare Hawale Watan Sathiyo" (version - II)	Anu Malik	Sameer	Sonu Nigam
Ab Tumhare Hawale Watan Sathiyo	"Hamein Tumse Hua Hai Pyar"	Anu Malik	Sameer	Alka Yagnik
Ab Tumhare Hawale Watan Sathiyo	"Mere Sar Pe Dupatta"	Anu Malik	Sameer	Alka Yagnik, Jaspinder Narula
Aetbaar	"Chhodo Chhodo Jao Jao"	Rajesh Roshan	Ibrahim Ashk	Sunidhi Chauhan
Agnipankh	"Mera Dil Fida Hai" (version - I)	Pritam	Sandeep Nath, Ravi Basnet	solo
Agnipankh	"Mera Dil Fida Hai" (version - II)	Pritam	Sandeep Nath, Ravi Basnet	Vinod Rathod
Aitraaz	"Aankhen Band Karke"	Himesh Reshammiya	Sameer	Alka Yagnik
Aitraaz	"Nazar Aa Raha Hai"	Himesh Reshammiya	Sameer	Alka Yagnik
Aitraaz	"Woh Tassavvur Ka Aalam"	Himesh Reshammiya	Sameer	Alka Yagnik
Aitraaz	"Tala Tum Tala Tum"	Himesh Reshammiya	Sameer	Alka Yagnik, Jayesh Gandhi
Asambhav	"Teri Dekh Dekh Ladkaiyan"	Viju Shah	Sameer	Kavita Krishnamurthy
Bride and Prejudice	"Tumse Kahen Ya Hum Naa Kahen"	Anu Malik	Javed Akhtar	Alka Yagnik
Bardaasht	"Dil Mera Dil Na Maane" (Male)	Himesh Reshammiya	Sameer	solo
Bardaasht	"Silsile Mulaqaton Ke"	Himesh Reshammiya	Sameer	Alka Yagnik
Hulchul	"Dekho Zara Dekho"	Vidyasagar	Sameer	Kunal Ganjawala
Hulchul	"Rafta Rafta"	Vidyasagar	Sameer	Sujatha Mohan
Kyun! Ho Gaya Na...	"Aao Na"	Shankar-Ehsaan-Loy	Javed Akhtar	Sadhana Sargam
Mujhse Shaadi Karogi	"Rab Kare"	Sajid-Wajid	Jalees Sherwani	Alka Yagnik
Mujhse Shaadi Karogi	"Mujhse Shaadi Karogi"	Sajid-Wajid	Jalees Sherwani	Sonu Nigam, Sunidhi Chauhan
Mujhse Shaadi Karogi	"Laal Dupatta"	Sajid-Wajid	Arun Bhairav	Alka Yagnik
Muskaan	"Jaaneman Chupke Chupke"	Nikhil-Vinay	Sameer	Alka Yagnik
Muskaan	"Jis Din Teri Meri"	Nikhil-Vinay	Sameer	Anuradha Paudwal
Muskaan	"Kabhi Jaage Soye"	Nikhil-Vinay	Sameer	Anuradha Paudwal
Swades	"Aahista Aahista Nindiya Tu Aa"	A. R. Rahman	Javed Akhtar	Sadhana Sargam
Swades	"Dekho Naa"	A. R. Rahman	Javed Akhtar	Alka Yagnik
Swades	"Yeh Tara Woh Tara"	A. R. Rahman	Javed Akhtar	Baby Pooja, Master Vignesh
Swades	"Yun Hi Chala Chal Raahi"	A. R. Rahman	Javed Akhtar	Hariharan, Kailash Kher
Veer-Zaara	"Main Yahaan Hoon"	Madan Mohan (late)	Javed Akhtar	solo
Veer-Zaara	"Yeh Hum Aa Gaye Hain Kahaan"	Madan Mohan (late)	Javed Akhtar	Lata Mangeshkar
Veer-Zaara	"Aisa Des Hai Mera"	Madan Mohan (late)	Javed Akhtar	Lata Mangeshkar, Gurdas Maan, Pritha Mazumdar
Veer-Zaara	"Lodi"	Madan Mohan (late)	Javed Akhtar	Lata Mangeshkar, Gurdas Maan
Khakee	"Wada Raha" ( Part 2)	Ram Sampath	Sameer	Shreya Ghoshal
Lakshya	"Agar Main Kahoon"	Shankar-Ehsaan-Loy	Javed Akhtar	Alka Yagnik
Fida	"Aaja Ve Mahi"	Anu Malik	Sameer	Alka Yagnik, Shahid Kapoor, Kareena Kapoor
Fida	"Nazar Nazar"	Anu Malik	Sameer	Sapna Mukherjee
Fida	"Dil Mere Na Aur Intezaar Kar"	Anu Malik	Sameer	Alka Yagnik
Fida	"Ek Tu Hai"	Anu Malik	Sameer	Alka Yagnik
Fida	"Aaj Kaho Sanam Jitna Pyar Karu Tumhe Utna"	Anu Malik	Sameer	Kavita Krishnamurthy
Shikaar	"Tumpe Marne Lage Hain"	Anand Raj Anand	Dev Kohli	Alka Yagnik
Shikaar	"Sona Sona Dil Se"	Anand Raj Anand	Dev Kohli	Solo
Shikaar	"O Jiya Kya Kiya"	Anand Raj Anand	Dev Kohli	Vinod Rathod, Anand Raj Anand, Sunidhi Chauhan
Shikaar	"Jitna Bhi Karlo Pyar"	Anand Raj Anand	Dev Kohli	Alka Yagnik
Garv: Pride & Honour	"Hum Tumko Nigahon Mein"	Sajid-Wajid	Shabbir Ahmed	Shreya Ghoshal
Dil Maange More	"Maine Chun Liya"	Himesh Reshammiya	Sameer	Shreya Ghoshal
Yeh Lamhe Judaai Ke	"Mere Dil Ko Kare Bekaboo"	Nikhil-Vinay		Asha Bhosle

=== 2005 ===
Film	Song	Composer(s)	Writer(s)	Co-artist(s)
Bunty Aur Babli	"Dhadak Dhadak"	Shankar-Ehsaan-Loy	Gulzar	Sunidhi Chauhan, Nihira Joshi
Bewafaa	"Ek Dilruba Hai"	Nadeem-Shravan	Sameer	
Fareb	"Jau Kaha Tere Bina"	Anu Malik	Sayeed Quadri	Shraddha Pandit
Lucky: No Time for Love	"Jaan Meri Ja Rahi Sanam"	Adnan Sami	Sameer	Anuradha Paudwal
Kyon Ki... It's Fate	"Kyon Ki Itna Pyar"	Himesh Reshammiya	Sameer	Alka Yagnik
Kyon Ki... It's Fate	"Dil Ke Badle Sanam"	Himesh Reshammiya	Sameer	Alka Yagnik
Kyon Ki... It's Fate	"Aajee Le Ik Pal Mein"	Himesh Reshammiya	Sameer	Alka Yagnik
Kyon Ki... It's Fate	"Kyon Ki Itna Pyar" (with Alka Adlip)	Himesh Reshammiya	Sameer	Alka Yagnik
Kyon Ki... It's Fate	"Kyon Ki Itna Pyar"	Himesh Reshammiya	Sameer	Radha Roy
Kyon Ki... It's Fate	"Jhatka Maare"	Himesh Reshammiya	Sameer	Shaan, Kailash Kher
Zeher	"Agar Tum Mil Jao"	Anu Malik		Shreya Ghoshal
Vaada	"Vaada Hai Yeh"	Himesh Reshammiya	Sameer	Alka Yagnik, Kumar Sanu
Vaada	"Main Deewana"	Himesh Reshammiya	Sameer	Alka Yagnik
Main Aisa Hi Hoon	"Deewanapan Deewangi"	Himesh Reshammiya	Sameer	Alka Yagnik,
Main Aisa Hi Hoon	"Dil Mera Todo Na"	Himesh Reshammiya	Sameer	Solo
Vaah! Life Ho Toh Aisi	"Chahenge Tumhein"	Himesh Reshammiya	Sameer	Shreya Ghoshal
Vaah! Life Ho Toh Aisi	"Dil Ke Maare Hai"	Himesh Reshammiya	Sameer	Alka Yagnik
Jurm	"O Sanam O Sanam"	Anand Raj Anand	Dev Kohli	Pamela Jain
Jurm	"Dil Dil"	Anu Malik	Rahat Indori	Shreya Ghoshal
Naam Gum Jaayega	"Hai Sama Pyar Ka"	Anand Milind	Praveen Bharadwaj	Shreya Ghoshal
Naam Gum Jaayega	"Kabhi Ye Na Poochhna"	Anand Milind	Praveen Bharadwaj	Anuradha Paudwal
Naam Gum Jaayega	"Hame Tumse Hai Pyar Kitna"	Anand Milind	Praveen Bharadwaj	Anuradha Paudwal

=== 2006 ===
Film	Song	Composer(s)	Writer(s)	Co-artist(s)
Chand Ke Paar Chalo	"Chand Ke Paar Chalo"	Vishnu Narayan	Rishi Azad	Alka Yagnik
Chand Ke Paar Chalo	"Deewana Poochh Lega"	Vishnu Narayan	Babu Bhai	solo
Don	"Khaike Paan Banaraswala"	Shankar-Ehsaan-Loy	Javed Akhtar	Shahrukh Khan
Sandwich	"Ek Chumma De Do"			Jaspinder Narula
Jaan-E-Mann	"Kubool Kar Le"	Anu Malik	Sameer	Rahul Vaidya, Amit Sana, Prajakta Shukre, Monali Thakur
Radha Ne Mala Japi Shyam Ki	"Hum Toh Niyam Nibhate Aaye"	Ravindra Jain	Ravindra Jain	Sadhana Sargam
Vivah	"Mujhe Haq Hai"	Ravindra Jain	Ravindra Jain	Shreya Ghoshal
Vivah	"Do Anjaane Ajnabi"	Ravindra Jain	Ravindra Jain	Shreya Ghoshal
Vivah	"Milan Abhi Aadha Adhura Hai"	Ravindra Jain	Ravindra Jain	Shreya Ghoshal

=== 2007 ===
Film	Song	Composer(s)	Writer(s)	Co-artist(s)
Big Brother	"Jeevan Tumne Diya Hai"	Anand Raaj Anand	Sameer	Alka Yagnik, Roop Kumar Rathod, Sadhana Sargam
Fear	"Dil Ki Daro Deewaar Pe"	Himesh Reshammiya	Sameer	Alka Yagnik
Fear	"Tu Hai Ishq"	Himesh Reshammiya	Sameer	Alka Yagnik, Sonu Nigam
Jahan Jaaeyega Hamen Paaeyega	"Na Chhoo Na"	Aadesh Shrivastava	Nusrat Badr	Sunidhi Chauhan
Om Shanti Om	"Deewangi Deewangi"	Vishal-Shekhar	Javed Akhtar	Shreya Ghoshal, Shaan, Sunidhi Chauhan, Rahul Saxena
Partner	"Do U Wanna Partner"	Sajid-Wajid	Sanjay Chhel	Shaan, Wajid Khan, Suzi Q. Clington
Victoria No. 203	"Do Bechare"	Viju Shah	Chandrashekhar Rajit, Verma Malik	Amit Kumar
Guru	"Baazi Laga"	A.R Rahman	Gulzar	Madhushree, Shweta Mohan & Bhargavi Pillai

=== 2008 ===
Film	Song	Composer(s)	Writer(s)	Co-artist(s)	
Tashan	"Falak Tak", "Dil Dance Maare"	Vishal Shekhar	Kausar Munir, Vishal Dadlani	Mahalakshmi Iyer, Sunidhi Chauhan, Sukhwinder Singh	
Tashan	God Tussi Great Ho	"Laal Chunariya"	Sajid-Wajid	Deven Shukla	Alka Yagnik
Black & White	"Yeh Hindustan Hai" (Part 2)	Sukhwinder Singh			
Gumnaam - The Mystery	"Mohabbat Se Zyada", "Mohabbat Hai Tumse"	Nadeem-Shravan	Sameer	Shreya Ghoshal, Monica Nath	

=== 2009 ===
Film	Song	Composer(s)	Writer(s)	Co-artist(s)
42 Kms	"Aate Jaate"	Tubby - Parik	Shahab Allahabadi	Shreya Ghoshal
Blue	"Yaar Mila Tha"	A.R. Rahman	Abbas Tyrewala	Madhushree
Dekh Bhai Dekh	"Kanha De Do Sharan"	Prem Anand	Rashid Firozabadi	Kavita Krishnamurthy
Hum Phirr Milein Na Milein	"Tere Dar Ke Siva"	Sandesh Shandilya	Irshad Kamil	Sadhana Sargam
What's Your Raashee?	"Sau Janam"	Sohail Sen	Javed Akhtar	Madhushree, Sohail Sen
Raftaar - An Obsession	"Allah Ji Allah Ji"	Nitin Raikwar	Rashid Firozabadi	Nihira Joshi

== 2010–Present ==
Year	Film	Song	Composer(s)	Writer(s)	Co-artist(s)
2010	Isi Life Mein...!	"Tum Darshan Hum Naina"	Meet Bros Anjjan		
2010	Isi Life Mein...!	"Apna	Meet Bros Anjjan		
2012	Agneepath	"Gun Gun Guna"	Ajay-Atul	Amitabh Bhattacharya	Sunidhi Chauhan
2012	Joker	"Jugnu"	G. V. Prakash Kumar		Kavita Krishnamurthy
2012	Baashha	"Ek Hi Chand Hain"	Deva	Indeevar	solo
2012	Student of the Year	"Radha"	Vishal–Shekhar	Anvita Dutt	Shreya Ghoshal
2013	Gippi	"Doll Baby Se"	Vishal–Shekhar		
2013	Bombay Talkies	"Apna Bombay Talkies"	Amit Trivedi		
2014	Humpty Sharma Ki Dulhania	"Dhangad Dhangad"	Sachin-Jigar		
2014	It's Entertainment	"Teri Mahima"	Sachin-Jigar		
2014	Kill Dil	"Daiya Maiya"	Shankar-Ehsaan-Loy	Gulzar	
2016	Jai Gangaajal	"Joganiya"	Salim-Sulaiman		
2017	Machine	"Tu Cheez Badi"	Tanishk Bagchi		Neha Kakkar
2018	Loveyatri	"Dholida"	Tanishk Bagchi		Palak Muchchal, Neha Kakkar
2018	Love Per Square Foot	"Ishq Mein Bajti Hai Ghanti"	Sohail Sen		
2018	Happy Phirr Bhag Jayegi	"Kudiye Ni"	Sohail Sen		
2018	Mohalla Assi				
2019	Super 30	"Jugrafiya"	Ajay–Atul	Amitabh Bhattacharya	Shreya Ghoshal
2019	Sye Raa Narasimha Reddy	"Jaago Narasimha Jaago Re"	Amit Trivedi	Swanand Kirkire	Shankar Mahadevan, Singer
2019	Transparency: Pardarshita	"Kitna Chanda Jeb Me Aya"	Pravesh Mallick	Annu Rizvi	
2020	Street Dancer 3D	" Hindustani"	Harsh Upadhyay		Shankar Mahadevan
2020	Coolie No. 1	"Mummy Kasam"	Tanishk Bagchi	Shabbir Ahmed, Ikka	Monali Thakur, Ikka
2021	Kaagaz	"Bailgadi"	Pravesh Mallick	Rashmi Virag	Alka Yagnik
2021	Sooryavanshi	"Tip Tip Barsa"	Tanishk Bagchi		Alka Yagnik
2023	Gadar 2	"Udd Ja Kale"	Mithoon, Uttam Singh	Anand Bakshi	Alka Yagnik
2023	Gadar 2	"Udd Ja Kale (Climax Version)"	Mithoon, Uttam Singh	Anand Bakshi	Jubin Nautiyal
2023	Gadar 2	"Main Nikla Gaddi"	Mithoon, Uttam Singh	Anand Bakshi	Aditya Narayan
2024	Srikanth	"Papa Kehte Hai (Reprise)"	Anand-Milind, Aditya Dev	Majrooh Sultanpuri	
2024	Naam	Yuhi Nahi	Himesh Reshammiya	Sameer Anjaan	Alka Yagnik
2026	Dhurandhar: The Revenge	"Hum Pyaar Karne Wale"	Shashwat Sachdev, Anand–Milind	Qveen Herby, Sameer Anjaan	Anuradha Paudwal, Qveen Herby

== Non-film Songs ==
Year	Film	Song name(s)	Music director(s)	Co-singer(s)
1991	Hum To Pyaar Karenge	"Pyaar Agar Jurm Hai"	Babul Bose	Anuradha Paudwal
1991	Hum To Pyaar Karenge	"Tujhe Kasam Hai Laila Ki"	Babul Bose	Anuradha Paudwal
1996	Crucial Jam – The Album	"Deewana Aaya Hai"	Rhythm Squad and EWC	solo
1996	Tera Ghunghta	"Deewana Hoon Sanam"	Babu Kishan	solo
1997	Mohabbat Kar Le	"Kasam Yaari Ki"	Ram Sampath	Shiamak Davar
2011	Mohabbat The Taj	"Holi Hai"		Kavita Krishnamurthy
2019	Madhosh Teri Aankhen	"Madhosh Teri Aankhen"		solo
2020	Sitam Gar	"Bin Tere Kuchh Bhi Nahi"		Sadhana Sargam
2020	Sitam Gar	"Kajari Kajari Kawari Kawari Aankhen"		solo
2020	Sitam Gar	"Tere Aashiqui Mein Dil"		Anuradha Paudwal
2020	Sitam Gar	"Barsaat Hai Lagne Laga Hai Dar"		Alka Yagnik
2020	Sitam Gar	"Kya Nahi Kya Kiya"		Alka Yagnik

=== Hindi Television songs ===
Year	TV Series	Song name(s)	Music director(s)	Lyricist	Co-singer(s)
1992	Yeh Duniya Ghazab Ki	"Yeh Duniya Ghazab Ki"			Kumar Sanu

== See also ==
- Udit Narayan
- Bollywood selected discography of Udit Narayan
- Abhijeet Bhattacharya Discography
- Sonu Nigam discography
- List of songs recorded by Amit Kumar
- List of songs recorded by Kishore Kumar
- List of songs recorded by Alka Yagnik
- List of songs recorded by Mohammed Rafi (T)
- List of songs recorded by Anuradha Paudwal
