= Divaneh =

Divaneh (Persian: ديونه) may refer to:

== Afghanistan ==
- Dīvāneh, Farah
- Dīvāneh, Kunduz

== Iran ==
- Divaneh, Iran, a village in Ilam Province, Iran
