= Hameeda Waheeduddin =

Pakistani politician

Member of the Provincial Assembly of the Punjab
- In office 15 August 2018 – 14 January 2023
- Constituency: PP-65 Mandi Bahauddin-I
- In office 29 May 2013 – 31 May 2018
- Constituency: PP-116 (Mandi Bahauddin-I)
- In office 2002–2007
- Constituency: PP-116 (Mandi Bahauddin-I)

Personal details
- Born: 4 January 1976 (age 50) Osaka, Japan
- Party: PMLN

Hameeda Waheeduddin (Punjabi, Urdu: حمیدہ وحید الدین; born 4 January 1976) is a Japanese-born Pakistani politician who was a Member of the Provincial Assembly of the Punjab from August 2018 till January 2023. Previously, she had served in the provincial assembly of the province of Punjab, Pakistan from 2002 to 2007 and May 2013 to May 2018.

== Early life and education ==
She was born on 4 January 1976 to a Japanese mother and Pakistani father. According to Embassy of Japan in Pakistan, her Japanese name is Hanako Sumida and she was born in Osaka, Japan. However, according to the Provincial Assembly of the Punjab, she was born in Mandi Bahauddin, Punjab, Pakistan.

She received her early education from Japan. After relocating to Pakistan she learnt Urdu language for 6 months and completed matriculation education in Urdu. She received the degree of Bachelor of Science in 1998 from Lahore College for Women University.

== Political career ==
She was elected to the Provincial Assembly of the Punjab as a candidate of Pakistan Muslim League (Q) (PML-Q) from Constituency PP-116 (Mandi Bahauddin-I) in the 2002 Pakistani general election. She received 33,122 votes and defeated Safia Begum, a candidate of Pakistan Muslim League (N) (PML-N). During her tenure as Member of the Punjab Assembly, she served as Parliamentary Secretary for Literacy and Non- formal Basic Education from 2003 to 2007.

She ran for the seat of the Provincial Assembly of the Punjab as a candidate of PML-Q from Constituency PP-116 (Mandi Bahauddin-I) in the 2008 general election but was unsuccessful. She received 19,638 votes and lost the seat to Tariq Mehmood Sahi, a candidate of Pakistan Peoples Party (PPP).

She was re-elected to the Provincial Assembly of the Punjab as a candidate of PML-N from PP-116 (Mandi Bahauddin-I) in the 2013 general election. She received 52,826 votes and defeated Dewan Mushtaq Ahmed. In June 2013, she was inducted into Chief Minister Shehbaz Sharif's cabinet as Minister for Women Development.

She was re-elected to Provincial Assembly of the Punjab as a candidate of PML-N from Constituency PP-65 (Mandi Bahauddin-I) in the 2018 general election.
