= Nazar Ke Samne =

1995 film by Jagdish A. Sharma

- Directed by: Jagdish A. Sharma
- Story by: S. Khan
- Produced by: Jai Sharma
- Starring: Akshay Kumar; Farheen
- Cinematography: Joe D'Souza
- Edited by: Hussain A. Burmawala
- Music by: Mahesh-Kishore
- Production company: Tanushree Films Combines
- Release date: 2 June 1995 (India)
- Country: India
- Language: Hindi
- Budget: ₹ 1.25 crore
- Box office: est. ₹ 2.14 crore

Nazar Ke Samne is a 1995 Indian action film directed by Jagdish A. Sharma. It stars Akshay Kumar, Kiran Kumar, Mukesh Khanna, Dalip Tahil and Farheen in pivotal role.

== Plot ==
Umesh, a photographer is arrested for the murder of his newspaper editor. The fact that they had an altercation earlier and that he was found at the murder scene with the murder weapon (a knife) in his hands lead to his arrest. However, in court the lawyer- Sahni, almost wins the case for Umesh. But Jai, an eyewitness, enters and his testimony results in a sentence to be hanged until death for Umesh. Jai Kumar is a fraud who can be paid to become an eyewitness. Sarita- Umesh's sister realises her brother's predicament and that Jai is a liar. She makes Jai realise how his lies can destroy families. He has a change of heart, falls in love with Sarita and promises to save Umesh. However, the court rejects Sahni's request to re-open the case. They come across a photograph which was taken accidentally at the murder scene. However, only the murderer's shoes are seen. Jai searches for the man who had paid him to lie and to find the owner of the shoes. It turns out that the lawyer is not such a nice man after all. He murdered the editor who was blackmailing him. Now as Jai is trying to find him, he has to make sure there is no proof or witnesses to prove he is the murderer. Who succeeds and how is the rest of the story.

== Cast ==
- Akshay Kumar as Jai Kumar
- Farheen as Sarita
- Ashok Saraf as Mamu
- Ekta Sohini as Chamia
- Mukesh Khanna as Badshah Khan Sharbatwala
- Kiran Kumar as Advocate Sangram Singh Sahni
- Dalip Tahil as Mac
- Shiva Rindani as Jimmy
- Dharmesh Tiwari as Umesh
- Anjana Mumtaz as Umesh's wife
- Bhushan Jeevan as Editor B.K. Sharma
- Dinesh Hingoo as Photo Studio Owner

== Soundtrack ==
#	Title	Singer(s)
1	"Dil Dhadke Kuchh Kah Nahin"	Kumar Sanu, Sadhana Sargam
2	"Main Badshah Khan Yaaro"	Mohammad Aziz
3	"Duniya Ne Mari Thokar"	Abhijeet
4	"Dheere Dheere Baat Badi"	Kumar Sanu, Sadhana Sargam
5	"Itane Karib Aao Ye Ho Hamara Haal"	Kavita Krishnamurthy
6	"Umar Dekh Jani Kamar Dekh Jani"	Kavita Krishnamurthy
