= Fauj =

- Directed by: Ashok Gaikwad
- Produced by: Gurnam Kaur
- Starring: Kamal Sadanah; Farheen; Madhoo; Kiran Kumar
- Cinematography: Anwar Siraj
- Music by: Raamlaxman
- Release date: 29 July 1994
- Country: India
- Language: Hindi

Fauj (transl. Army) is a 1994 Indian Hindi-language film directed by Ashok Gaikwad and produced by Gurunam Kaur. The film stars Kamal Sadanah, Farheen, Madhoo and Kiran Kumar.

== Cast ==
- Kamal Sadanah as Jatashankar
- Farheen as Geeta
- Madhoo as Kamli
- Kiran Kumar as Thakur Yuvraj Singh
- Sudesh Berry as Vijay
- Ajinkya Deo as Samanth
- Satyajeet Puri as Nagesh
- Tinu Anand as Inspector Ramlakhan Yadav
- Aruna Irani as Durga
- Sudha Chandran as Jamuna
- Tej Sapru as Nagraj, Thakur Yuvraj Singh's elder son
- Shiva as Yuvraj Singh's second son
- Sanjeeva as Suraj
- Ankush Mohit as Yuvraj Singh's third son
- Harish Patel as Anokhe Lal
- Vikas Anand as Law College Professor
- Rajesh Puri as Anokhe Lal's assistant

== Music ==
1. "Tere Naam Jawani Likh Dali – Udit Narayan, Lata Mangeshkar
2. "Dil Pe Likh De Tera Naam" – Udit Narayan, Sadhana Sargam
3. "Saare Zamane Se Keh Do" – Udit Narayan, Sadhana Sargam
4. "Seedha Saada Bhola Bhala" – Udit Narayan, Sadhana Sargam
5. "Tarana Mere Dil Ka" – Kumar Sanu
6. "Teri Nazar Ne Humko Apne Liye Chuna Hai" – Kumar Sanu, Kavita Krishnamurthy
7. "Tumko Chhu Ke Kiya Hai Humne Vaada" – Kumar Sanu, Kavita Krishnamurthy
