= Dewan (disambiguation) =

Dewan is the designation of a powerful government official, minister or ruler. It may also refer to:

== People ==
- Dewan (given name)
- Dewan (surname)
- Maniram Dewan, popular name of Maniram Dutta Baruah (1806–1858), an Assamese nobleman in British India
- Dewan or Yakkha people, an indigenous ethnic group living primarily in Nepal and India

== Other uses ==
- Dewan Group, a group of companies with headquarters in Karachi, Pakistan

== See also ==
- Dewan's Road, Mysore, Karnataka state, India
- Diwan (disambiguation)
