= Diwan =

Diwan is a term originally used in Persian, Arabic, and Turkish with derivatives in other Asian and European languages such as diwaan, dewan, etc. (see etymology sections at Divan, Diwan (poetry) and Dewan). These terms may refer to:

== Arts and entertainment ==
- Diwan (poetry), a collection of Persian, Arabic, Turkish, or Urdu poetry
  - Diwan (Nasir Khusraw) by Nasir Khusraw
- Diwân, a 1998 album by Rachid Taha
- Diwan 2, a 2006 album by Rachid Taha
- Diwan (film), a 2003 Indian Tamil-language film
- Diwan, a character in the anime series Skyland

== Education ==
- Diwan (school), a federation of schools teaching in Breton language in Brittany (diwan means seed in Breton)
- Diwan College of Management, former name of Taiwan Shoufu University

== Government and politics ==
- Divan or Diwan, a high governmental body in many Islamic states
- Diwan, a code of laws first introduced by Sharif ul-Hāshim of Sulu
- The Girgam or Diwan, the royal chronicle of the Kanem-Bornu Empire, written in Arabic

== Other uses ==
- Muneeb Diwan (born 1972), Canadian cricket player
- Diwan, Queensland, a locality in the Shire of Douglas, Australia
- Diwan (title) (dewan or divan), a number of Middle Eastern titles used in various languages for high officials, especially of cabinet rank, or as a rank of high nobility in South Asia
- Diwan, or religious scroll containing Mandaean scriptures

== See also ==
- Dewan Bahadur, a title of honor awarded during British Raj
- Dewan (disambiguation)
- Diwana (disambiguation)
- Diwani, a calligraphic variety of the Arabic script
