= Dewan (given name) =

Dewan is a given name which may refer to:

- Dewan Abdul Basith (born 1911), Bangladeshi lawyer and politician
- Dewan Abul Abbas (born 1926), Pakistani and Bangladeshi politician
- Dewan Shamsul Abedin (fl. 1979–1986), Bangladeshi politician
- Dewan Mushtaq Ahmed (born 1949), Pakistani politician
- Dewan Mohammad Azraf (1908–1999), Bengali philosopher, teacher, author, politician, journalist and activist
- Dewan Chand, Indo-Fijian educationist, politician and convicted sex abuser
- Dewan Prem Chand (1916–2003), Indian Army lieutenant general
- Dewan Chand Saini (1887–?), Indian criminal lawyer and politician
- Dewan Taimur Raja Chowdhury (1917–1997), Bangladeshi politician
- Dewan Yousuf Farooqui, Pakistani businessman and former provincial government minister (1994 2004, 2007)
- Dewan Gabriel (born 1993), Nigerian politician
- Dewan Farid Gazi (1924–2010), Bangladeshi politician
- Dewan Hernandez (born 1996), American basketball player
- Dewan Mohammad Idris (1920–1990), Bangladeshi politician
- Dewan Nazrul (born 1950), Bangladeshi film director, lyricist and screenwriter
- Dewan Nurunnabi (died 2013), Bangladeshi politician
- Dewan Ranjit Rai (1913–1947), Indian colonel killed in action
- Dewan Hason Raja Choudhury (1854–1922), Bengali mystic poet and songwriter
- Dewan Sabbir (born 1992), Bangladeshi cricketer
- Dewan Sachanand, 21st century Pakistani politician
- Dewan Md. Salauddin (born 1962), Bangladeshi politician
- Dewan Rabindranath Soni (fl. 1979–2018), retired Indian Army lieutenant general
