= Farheen =

Indian actress

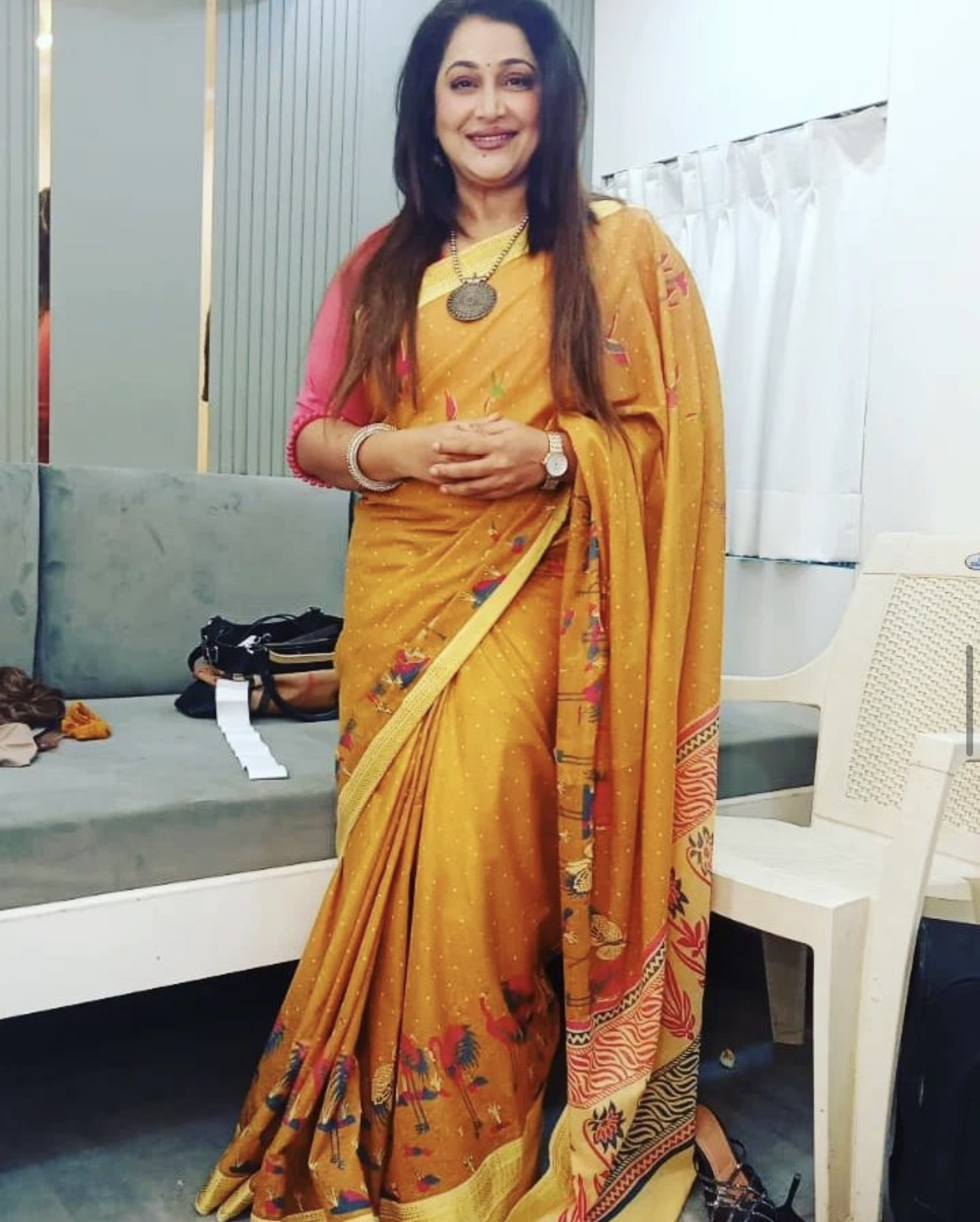
- Born: Farheen Khan
- Other names: Farheen Prabhakar; Bindiya
- Years active: 1992–1998; 2014–present
- Spouse: Manoj Prabhakar (m. 1994)
- Children: 2

Farheen Prabhakar (née Khan) is an Indian actress, who works in Hindi, Kannada and Tamil films. She had a brief career as a leading actress, that began with Jaan Tere Naam in 1992, and gained recognition for her resemblance to actress Madhuri Dixit. Farheen also appeared in some South Indian films, in which she was credited as "Bindiya". She is married to former cricketer Manoj Prabhakar since 1994.

== Early and personal life ==
Farheen was born as Farheen Khan in an Indian Muslim family.

She met cricketer Manoj Prabhakar in 1993 and soon entered into a relationship with him; Prabhakar was going through a troubled marriage at the time. They had a nikah wedding in 1994. The couple have two sons: Raahil and Manavansh. Prabhakar obtained divorce from his first wife, Sandhya, in 2008. He and Farheen then married again the following year, this time in a traditional Hindu wedding ceremony.

Farheen has added her husband's last name post-marriage, and is sometimes referred to as "Farheen Prabhakar". The couple maintains a low public profile; they reside in Delhi, with their sons and Prabhakar's father. Prabhakar's eldest son Rohan (from his first wife) and Rohan's wife also live with the family.

== Career ==
Farheen made her debut opposite Ronit Roy in 1992 with Deepak Balraj Vij's Jaan Tere Naam and became instantly popular due to her resemblance with leading actress Madhuri Dixit. Farheen turned down a supporting role in the thriller Baazigar (1993), which was then played by Shilpa Shetty and proved a breakthrough for her.

Farheen had rejected Baazigar to act in Kamal Hassan's Kalaignan (1993), in which she was credited as Bindiya and played Hassan's love interest. A reviewer for The Indian Express noted that she "does not have much to do" in the film. During this period, Farheen also starred in films such as Halli Meshtru (1992)—her Kannada debut, Aag Ka Toofan (1993), Fauj (1994) and Nazar Ke Samne (1995), opposite Akshay Kumar. She left the industry in 1998.

In 2014, Farheen announced her comeback to films in the sequel of her debut Jaan Tere Naam, again directed by Deepak Balraj Vij. As of 2022, she is working in two productions: Harish Kotian's Rate (which will be released on Amazon Prime Video) and Shivam Nair's next directorial venture.

== Partial filmography ==
Year	Film	Role	Language
1992	Jaan Tere Naam	Pinky Malhotra	Hindi
1992	Halli Meshtru	Parimala	Kannada
1993	Kalaignan	Divya	Tamil
1993	Aag Ka Toofan	Radha	Hindi
1993	Dil Ki Baazi	Asha	Hindi
1993	Rayaru Bandaru Mavana Manege	Shivaranjini	Kannada
1993	Sainik	Minnie Dutt	Hindi
1993	Meri Aan	Farheen	Hindi
1993	Tahqiqaat	Mary	Hindi
1994	Saajan Ka Ghar	Kiran	Hindi
1994	Fauj	Geetha	Hindi
1994	Amaanat	Bijli / Geeta / Radha	Hindi
1995	Nazar Ke Samne	Sarita	Hindi
1995	Shiva		Kannada
1996	King Soloman	Geethanjali	Malayalam
1996	Agni Prem	Sangeeta	Hindi
1997	Thali		Telugu
