= Diwana Tughal Khel =

Coordinates: 32°54′39″N 70°38′22″E

- Town
- Interactive map of Diwana Tughal Khel
- Country: Pakistan
- Highest elevation: 323 m (1,060 ft)
- Time zone: UTC+5 (PST)

Dewana Tughal Khel is a town located within the Bannu District of the Khyber Pakhtunkhwa province in Pakistan.
