= Diwana, Balochistan =

Town in Balochistan, Pakistan

Diwana
- Location within Pakistan
- Coordinates: 26.4°N 67.17°E
- Country: Pakistan
- Province: Balochistan
- Elevation: 267 m (876 ft)
- Time zone: UTC+5 (PST)

Diwana or Diwāna or Diwana Thana is a city in Balochistan province of Pakistan, situated near the border with Sindh. It lies at 26°04′46″N 67°17′16″E and has an elevation of 267 metres (879 feet).
