= Deewana =

Deewana may refer to:

- Deewana (1952 film), Bollywood movie starring Suraiya and Suresh
- Diwana (1967 film), Bollywood movie starring Raj Kapoor, Saira Banu and Lalita Pawar
- Deewana (1992 film), Bollywood movie starring Rishi Kapoor, Shahrukh Khan and Divya Bharti
- Deewana (2013 film), a 2013 Bengali film starring Jeet and Srabanti
- Deewana (TV series), a 2016 Pakistan television drama series
- Deewana (album), a 1999 studio album by Indian singer Sonu Nigam
- Deewana (2026 film), 2026 Indian telugu film starring Harshith Malgireddy and Smeha Manimegalai

== See also ==
- Diwana (disambiguation)
- Deewane, 2000 Indian film
- Deewaanapan, 2001 Indian film by Ashu Trikha
