= Diwana railway station =

Railway station in Haryana, India

Diwana Railway Station

General information
- Location: NH 44, Diwana, Panipat district, Haryana; India
- Elevation: 235 metres (771 ft)
- System: Indian Railways station
- Owner: Indian Railways
- Operator: Northern Railway
- Platforms: 2
- Tracks: 4

Construction
- Structure type: Standard (on-ground station)
- Parking: No
- Cycle facilities: No

Other information
- Status: Double electric line
- Station code: DWNA
- Zone(s): Northern Railway
- Division(s): Delhi
Location

Diwana Railway Station is a railway station serving the Diwana village in the Panipat district of Haryana, India. Its code is DWNA. The station consists of two platform. The platform is not well sheltered. The station also serves the nearest villages of Sewah, Diwana, Garhi Pasina, Jhattipur and Khalila.

== See also ==
- 2007 Samjhauta Express bombings
