= Dil Ki Baazi =

- Directed by: Anil Ganguly
- Written by: Madan Joshi (Dialogues)
- Screenplay by: Ram Kelkar
- Story by: Anil Ganguly
- Produced by: Anil Ganguly
- Starring: Akshay Kumar; Ayesha Jhulka; Avinash Wadhavan; Farheen; Raakhee; Paresh Rawal; Anupam Kher
- Cinematography: Anant Bawdekar
- Edited by: Dilip Kotalgi; Zafar Sultan
- Music by: Raamlaxman
- Production company: Sri RV Films International
- Release date: 7 May 1993
- Country: India
- Language: Hindi

Dil Ki Baazi (transl. Heart's Bet) is a 1993 Indian Hindi action film directed by Anil Ganguly. The film stars Akshay Kumar, Ayesha Jhulka, Avinash Wadhavan, Farheen, Raakhee, Paresh Rawal, and Anupam Kher in lead roles.

== Plot ==
Ajay is a rich, spoilt brat who falls in love with Asha, who has holds all the responsibilities of her family on her shoulders. Vijay is a middle-class man searching for jobs who loves Aarti.

Ajay and Vijay hate each other. Aarti's father gets Vijay a job in the same company where he was working, unaware of the fact that it's Ajay's father's company. Ajay tries to get him fired, but fails every time.

It is revealed that Ajay and Vijay are half-brothers. Ajay's father, Vishwanath Kashyap left Vijay's mom Nirmaladevi to marry Ajay's mom Lalita for money. He tells the truth to Ajay and asks him to promise that he will find his half-brother and his stepmother and will give them equal share in the property.

Meanwhile, Vijay realizes that Ajay is his half-brother and seeks revenge for his mother. He join hands with Ajay's rivals in order to destroy Ajay.

He overhears Ajay's conversation with his mom where he says that he wants to give half of his property to his half-brother and stepmother whom he is trying to find for so many days. Vijay realises his mistake and forgives Ajay.

Some goons attack Ajay's mom and the boys take revenge on Bhogilal who killed Ajay's grandfather. Both brothers unite after so many years. The story ends with Ajay's mother dying and asks Nirmala Devi to accept both her sons. The live together as a family then.

== Cast ==
- Raakhee as Nirmala Devi
- Akshay Kumar as Vijay Kashyap
- Ayesha Jhulka as Aarti
- Avinash Wadhavan as Ajay Kashyap
- Farheen as Asha
- Anupam Kher as Daulatram
- Paresh Rawal as Santosh Kumar / Bhogilal
- Navin Nischol as Vishwanath Kashyap
- Anju Mahendru as Lalita Kashyap
- Anu Kapoor as Bihari
- Laxmikant Berde as Prem Murali
- Ajit Vachhani as Lawyer Vachhani
- Suresh Chatwal as Suresh
- Viju Khote as Police Constable Damodar
- Dinesh Hingoo as Taxi Driver
- Mac Mohan as Jagmohan, Santosh's henchman
- Gurbachan Singh as Zorro, Santosh's henchman

== Soundtrack ==
| Song | Singer |
|---|---|
| "Yeh Badal Aasman Pe Kyun Chhaye Hai" | Lata Mangeshkar, S. P. Balasubrahmanyam |
| "Tum Saaz Chhedo" | Lata Mangeshkar |
| "Ruk Bhi Jao Jana, Dil Ko Na Tadpana" | Lata Mangeshkar, Udit Narayan |
| "Kitni Sardi Pad Gayi" | Udit Narayan, Alka Yagnik |
| "Poochh Lenge Jake" | Amit Kumar |
| "Shaadi Karoongi" | Amit Kumar, Alka Yagnik |
| "Buddha Kya" | Alka Yagnik |
