= Constituency PP-116 =

Constituency of the Punjabi Provincial Legislature, Pakistan

Constituency P-117 is a local political division in Pakistan. Its full name is PP-117 Mandi Bahauddin-II (Urdu: پی پی 116 منڈی بہاوالدین.) P-117 elected Tariq Mehmood Sahi as Member of Provincial Assembly of the Punjab (MPA) in 2008. He belongs to the Pakistan Peoples Party Parliamentarians (PPPP) political party.

There are 8 union councils in the Provincial Assembly Constituency.

The last election of local bodies was held in 1991.

In 2008 the total number of registered voters was 147,163.

== Main Areas ==
- Mandi Bahauddin M.C.
- Chilianwala Qanungo Halqa
- Mandi Bahauddin Qanungo Halqa of Mandi Bahauddin tehsil excluding the following patwar Circles
- Wasu
- Chak No.02
- Chak Basaua
- Hardo Bohat
- Charund
- Dhok Daud of Mandi Bahauddin District.
- Dhok Kasib
- Phiray

== Election Results 2008 ==
- Registered Voters 147,163
- Votes 75,384
- Valid Votes 70,092
- Rejected Votes 1,570
- Voter participation 51.22%

=== Ranking of political parties ===
1. Pakistan Peoples Party Parliamentarians
2. Pakistan Muslim League (N)
3. Pakistan Muslim League
4. Other parties

| Candidate | Party | Votes | |
|---|---|---|---|
| Tariq Mehmood Sahi | PPPP | 50000 | |
| Faiza Mushtaq Ahmed | PML-N | 22799 | |
| Hameeda Waheed-Ud-Din | PML-Q | 30627 | |
| n/a | All Others | | 252 |
