= Agni Prem =

1996 Indian film

- Directed by: S. Rukan
- Produced by: S. Nayeem
- Music by: Bappi Lahiri
- Release date: 26 April 1996
- Country: India
- Language: Hindi

Agni Prem is a 1996 Bollywood romance drama film directed by S. Rukan, starring Shatrughan Sinha, Johnny Lever, Rohini Hattangadi and Farheen. The film was released on 26 April 1996 under the banner of Minar Production.

== Plot ==
The story of Agnee Prem revolves around two young lovers Sangeeta daughter of a rich business man Seth Deen Dayal and Rahul who hails from a middle-class family.

== Cast ==
- Shatrughan Sinha as Shankar
- Rajat as Rahul
- Farheen as Sangeeta
- Aasif Sheikh as Jolly
- Mushtaq Khan
- Tinu Anand as Seth Deen Dayal
- Rohini Hattangadi as Mrs. Dayal
- Johnny Lever
- Birbal

== Soundtrack ==
The music of the film was composed by Bappi Lahiri.

1. "Ishq Mein Jeena Ishq Mein Marna" – Nitin Mukesh, Mohammed Aziz
2. "Jaan Banke Rahenge" – Kavita Krishnamurthy, Udit Narayan
3. "Madam Madam Bolo" – Sapna Mukherjee, Sudesh Bhosle
4. "Mujhe To Pyar Pyar" – Alka Yagnik
5. "Prem Agni Prem" – Bappi Lahiri
6. "Roshni Chand Se" – Kavita Krishnamurthy
7. "Roshni Chand Se v2" – Kavita Krishnamurthy
8. "Saajan Ko Mera Salaam" – Kavita Krishnamurthy
