= Jaan Tere Naam =

1992 film by Deepak Balraj Vij

- Poster
- Directed by: Deepak Balraj Vij
- Produced by: Jimmy Nirula
- Starring: Ronit Roy; Farheen
- Music by: Nadeem-Shravan
- Release date: 21 February 1992
- Running time: 150 min.
- Country: India
- Language: Hindi

Jaan Tere Naam is a 1992 Indian Hindi-language romantic drama film directed by Deepak Balraj Vij and produced by Jimmy Nirula. It stars Ronit Roy and Farheen in their screen debuts.

The plot revolves around Pinky Malhotra, and her romantic relationship with two boys in her college - Sunil and Vicky.

== Plot ==
Beautiful rich girl Pinky Malhotra has many admirers in college. Among them are acquaintances, the poor and naive Sunil and rich and a little arrogant Vicky Oberoi who's also her dad Ajay Malhotra's friend Mr. Oberoi's son. She falls in love with Sunil first and they hope to get married in the future. However 4 of his friends, Charlie, Chichi, Avinash and Mohabbat Khan who are her other admirers jealously break them up after they get a girl named Rita to lie to her Sunil impregnated her when they were in love. She then falls in love with Vicky and becomes engaged to him as per her parents' wishes. Sunil who is very heartbroken by all this tries to rekindle their romance by constantly telling her his love is true however she makes his life hell even getting him expelled from the college after accusing him of harassment. However, at her wedding, she realizes her mistake when his widowed mother accuses her of ruining his life after he also gets mercilessly beaten up by her dad's friends because he stopped her from loving him while marrying Vicky. Despite this, he still hates Pinky for her unfaithfulness and leaves with his bitter mother. Pinky can't live without him and feels very ashamed for her betrayal. She follows him to the love place where they wrote their names promising to be each others eternally, after Charlie, Avinash, Mohabbat and Chichi confess to her parents they caused their breakup and Vicky realized their love after they also confessed it to him there, before the ceremony. She constantly confesses to Sunil she loves him a lot and apologizes to him. After he forgives her, they finally rekindle their romance and with Vicky's, his parents', Sunil's mother's and her parents' approval, along with their friends and Vicky's friends, who are also there, they happily prepare for their wedding. They both get married and return to college.

== Cast ==
- Ronit Roy as Sunil
- Farheen as Pinky Malhotra
- Balbinder Dhami as Vicky Oberoi
- Sulabha Deshpande as Sunil's Mother
- Vijay Arora as Ajay Malhotra
- Anju Mahendru as Mrs. Malhotra
- Navneet Nishan as Archana
- Ali Asgar as Chichi
- Ajit Vachani as Mr. Oberoi
- Ravi Baswani as hotel employee
- Shehnaz Kudia as Samantha
- Kedarnath Saigal as Inspector

== Soundtrack ==
Jaan Tere Naam

Soundtrack album by Nadeem Shravan
- Released: 1991
- Recorded: 1991
- Venue: Bombay
- Studio: Sunny Super Sound
- Genre: Feature film soundtrack
- Length: 45:40
- Label: Tips Cassettes & Records
- Producer: Nadeem Shravan

Nadeem Shravan chronology
Phool Aur Kaante (1991)	Jaan Tere Naam (1991)	Sadak (1991)

The soundtrack of the movie was composed by the duo Nadeem-Shravan. The lyrics were written by Rani Malik, Gauhar Kaanpuri, Sayeed Rahi, Nawab Arzoo, Surendra Sathi and Aziz Khan Shahani. The soundtrack was released in 1991 by Weston Components Music Limited, The album is recorded by Asha Bhosle, Kumar Sanu, Alka Yagnik, Udit Narayan, Sadhana Sargam. The songs Hum Laakh Chupaye, Maine Yeh Dil Tumko Diya and Rone Na Dijiyega are chart topper of 90's.

#	Song	Singer	Lyricist
1	"Hum Laakh Chupaye"	Kumar Sanu, Asha Bhosle	Syed Rahi
2	"Akhkha India Jaanta Hai"	Kumar Sanu	Aziz Khan Shahani
3	"Maine Yeh Dil Tumko Diya"	Kumar Sanu, Alka Yagnik	Rani Malik
4	"Kal College Bandh Ho Jaayega"	Udit Narayan, Sadhana Sargam	Nawab Arzoo
5	"Romance Period"	Kumar Sanu	Surender Saathi
6	"In The Morning By The Sea"	Kumar Sanu, Alka Yagnik, Udit Narayan	Surender Saathi
7	"Rone Na Dijiyega"	Kumar Sanu	Gauhar Kanpuri
8	"Kal College Bandh Ho Jaayega" (Sad)	Udit Narayan	Nawab Arzoo
