= Diwana, Panipat =

Diwana
- village
- Location in Haryana, India Diwana (India)
- Coordinates: 29.3158143°N 76.9657516°E
- Country: India
- State: Haryana
- District: Panipat district
- Website: haryana.gov.in

Diwana is a village situated in Haryana, India. It comes under district Panipat, municipality Panipat. The village is situated 10 km away from Panipat.

== Railway station ==
There is a Diwana railway station near the village and in 2007 there was a terrorist bomb blast in Samjhauta Express. According to the National Investigation Agency (NIA), the terror blast was carried out in pursuance to a criminal conspiracy aimed at threatening the "unity, integrity, security and sovereignty" of India. 68 people including 43 Pakistan citizens, 10 Indian citizens and 15 unidentified people were killed in the blast. 64 out of the total killed were civil passengers and 4 were Railways officials. 12 people including 10 Pakistanis and two Indians were also injured in the terrorist attack. A number of train coaches were also burnt in the resultant fire.
