= Dewan Mushtaq Ahmed =

Pakistani politician

Dewan Mushtaq Ahmed (Urdu: دیوان مشتاق احمد)

Member of the Provincial Assembly
- In office 17 February 1997 – 12 October 1999
- Preceded by: Shahbaz Sharif
- Succeeded by: Shahbaz Sharif

Personal details
- Born: 23 September 1949 (age 77) Mandi Bahauddin, Punjab, Pakistan)
- Party: Pakistan Muslim League (N)
- Children: four
- Education: Intermediate
- Profession: Politician

Dewan Mushtaq Ahmed (Urdu: دیوان مشتاق احمد), born on 23 September 1949 in Mandi Bahauddin), is a Pakistani politician.

He completed his Intermediate education in Mandi Bahauddin and earned his bachelor's degree from Forman Christian College. The son of Dewan Muhammad Ishaq, he is an agriculturist and served as Chairman of the Municipal Committee of Mandi Bahauddin for six years.

He was elected as a Member of the Provincial Assembly (MPA) to the Provincial Assembly of the Punjab from 1997 to 1999.

Following General Musharraf's military coup in 1999, Ahmed was one of the few Pakistan Muslim League (N) Parliamentarians who remained loyal to his party, despite lucrative offers from Pakistan Muslim League (Q) (General Musharraf’s party), and he actively voiced his opposition to the military coup.
