= Dīvāneh, Farah =

Dīvāneh
- Location in Afghanistan
- Coordinates: 32°17′50″N 62°27′53″E
- Country: Afghanistan
- Province: Farah Province
- Time zone: UTC+4:30

Dīvāneh (Persian: ديوانه; also spelled Divana and Ḏiwāna Pashto: دیوانه) is a village in Farah Province, Afghanistan.
