= Kumar Sanu =

Indian playback singer (born 1957)

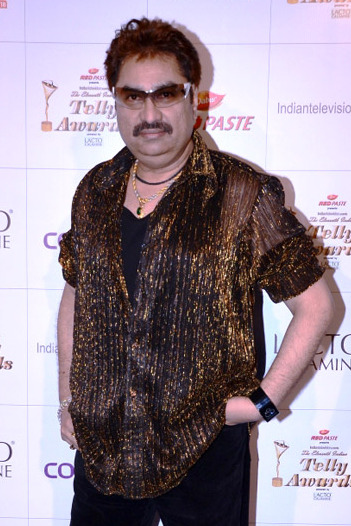
- Kumar Sanu at Indian Telly Awards
- Born: Kedarnath Bhattacharya; 20 October 1957 (age 69); Calcutta, West Bengal, India
- Other name: Melody King of Bollywood
- Occupation: Playback singer
- Years active: 1983–present
- Spouses: Rita Dutta (m. 1986; div. 1994) Saloni Bhattacharya (m. 2001)
- Children: Shannon K
- Awards: Full list
- Honors: Padma Shri (2009); Banga Bibhushan (2022)

YouTube information
- Channel: @thekumarsanuofficial
- Years active: 2014–present
- Genre: Music
- Subscribers: 1.25 million
- Views: 2.2 billion
- Last updated: 1 December 2025

Kumar Sanu (born as Kedarnath Bhattacharya; 20 October 1957) is an Indian playback singer who gained recognition in Hindi cinema during the 1990s and early 2000s. He is known for his melodious voice and prolific output, recording songs in multiple languages including Hindi, Bengali, Nepali, Marathi, Tamil, Telugu, Kannada, Malayalam, Gujarati, Punjabi, Bhojpuri and Odia.

Sanu gained widespread recognition with the soundtrack of Aashiqui (1990), which featured him in nearly all of the male solo songs and established him as a leading playback singer of that period.

He won the Filmfare Awards for Best Male Playback Singer for five consecutive years from 1991 to 1995, for films including Aashiqui (1990), Saajan (1991), Deewana (1992), Baazigar (1993) and 1942: A Love Story (1994).

In 1993, Sanu entered the Guinness World Records for recording 28 songs in a single day.

Several of his songs were included in the BBC "Top 40 Bollywood soundtracks of all time". He has also appeared as a mentor and judge on television music reality shows.

In recognition of his contributions to Indian music, Sanu was awarded the Padma Shri by the Government of India in 2009.

== Early life ==
Kumar Sanu's father, Pashupati Bhattacharya, was a vocalist and composer. He and his elder sister lived in Panchanantala at Gopal Bose Lane in the Sinthee area of North Kolkata.

== Career ==
Kumar Sanu, born Kedarnath Bhattacharya, began his playback career in 1984 with the film Yeh Desh, followed by the Bangladeshi film Tin Konya (1986). He gained recognition in Hindi cinema with "Jashn Hai Mohabbat Ka" from Hero Hiralal (1988).

=== 1980s: Early career ===
In 1989, singer Jagjit Singh introduced him to composers Kalyanji and Anandji, who encouraged him to adopt the stage name "Kumar Sanu". He contributed to the soundtrack of Jaadugar (1989).

=== 1990s: Prime ===
1990–1991: Breakthrough and establishment

Kumar Sanu's breakthrough into mainstream Hindi cinema came with the soundtrack of Aashiqui (1990). The album became one of the most successful Hindi film soundtracks of its era, and Sanu performed a substantial portion of its songs. Tracks such as "Ab Tere Bin", "Nazar Ke Samne", "Tu Meri Zindagi Hai", "Bas Ek Sanam Chahiye" and "Dheere Dheere Se Meri Zindagi Mein Aana" established his characteristic romantic playback style.

He consolidated this success in 1991 with major soundtracks including Saajan, Sadak, Dil Hai Ke Manta Nahin, Phool Aur Kaante, Saathi and Jeena Teri Gali Mein. Saajan was particularly important, with Sanu winning the Filmfare Award for Best Male Playback Singer for "Mera Dil Bhi Kitna Pagal Hai". By the end of 1991, he had become one of the leading male playback singers in Hindi cinema.

1992–1993: Superstar emergence

The year 1992 marked a major expansion of Sanu's popularity. His most important releases included Deewana, Jaan Tere Naam, Dil Ka Kya Kasoor, Khiladi, Jigar, Bol Radha Bol, Raju Ban Gaya Gentleman and Chamatkar.

The soundtrack of Deewana was particularly significant. Sanu's songs "Sochenge Tumhe Pyar", "Teri Umeed Tera Intezaar" and "Teri Isi Ada Pe Sanam" became enduring examples of his early-1990s romantic style.

In 1993, his popularity expanded further through Baazigar, Hum Hain Rahi Pyar Ke, Phir Teri Kahani Yaad Aayee, Rang, Anari, Dalaal, Damini, Sainik and Sir. Songs such as "Baazigar O Baazigar", "Yeh Kaali Kaali Aankhen", "Ghoonghat Ki Aad Se", "Tere Dar Par Sanam" and "Teri Mohabbat Ne" strengthened his position as one of the most prominent romantic playback singers of the decade.

1994–1996: Peak period

The period 1994–1996 is generally the strongest section of Kumar Sanu's 1990s career in terms of the combination of commercial success, number of major soundtracks and long-term popularity.

1994

His major 1994 releases included 1942: A Love Story, Hum Aapke Hain Koun..!, Mohra, Main Khiladi Tu Anari, Yeh Dillagi, Dilwale, Raja Babu, Vijaypath, Suhaag and Salaami.

Among these, 1942: A Love Story was particularly important to Sanu's individual legacy because of "Ek Ladki Ko Dekha", which became one of his signature romantic songs. Mohra and Hum Aapke Hain Koun..!, meanwhile, became two of the decade's most culturally significant soundtracks.

1995

1995 can be regarded as Kumar Sanu's strongest overall year of the decade. His major releases included Dilwale Dulhania Le Jayenge, Karan Arjun, Barsaat, Coolie No. 1, Akele Hum Akele Tum, Criminal, Naajayaz and Sabse Bada Khiladi.

The year produced several enduring recordings, including "Tujhe Dekha To", "Humko Sirf Tumse Pyar Hai", "Tu Mile Dil Khile" and "Dil Kehta Hai". Dilwale Dulhania Le Jayenge became one of the most influential Hindi films of the decade, while Barsaat and Criminal became particularly important to Sanu's own musical catalogue.

1996

Sanu remained at the top of the industry in 1996, with releases including Raja Hindustani, Saajan Chale Sasural, Jeet, Khamoshi, Fareb, Chaahat, Diljale, Papa Kehte Hai, Tere Mere Sapne and Khiladiyon Ka Khiladi.

Raja Hindustani became the defining album of the year, while Saajan Chale Sasural, Jeet, Khamoshi and Fareb demonstrated the continuing demand for Sanu's voice.

1997: Elite second phase

In 1997, Kumar Sanu continued to appear on numerous commercially successful soundtracks. His major releases included Pardes, Gupt, Yes Boss, Hero No. 1, Judwaa, Ishq, Koyla, Virasat, Mr. and Mrs. Khiladi and Auzaar.

The soundtrack of Pardes was particularly significant because of "Do Dil Mil Rahe Hain", which became one of Sanu's most enduring songs of the latter half of the decade.

Although his dominance was no longer as overwhelming as it had been in 1994–96, he remained an elite-level playback singer.

1998–1999: Transition period

By 1998, the Hindi playback industry had become increasingly competitive. Udit Narayan, Abhijeet, Sonu Nigam and other singers increasingly occupied major positions alongside Kumar Sanu.

Nevertheless, Sanu remained highly successful. His 1998 releases included Kuch Kuch Hota Hai, Pyaar To Hona Hi Tha, Soldier, Pyaar Kiya To Darna Kya, Ghulam, Jab Pyaar Kisise Hota Hai, Bandhan, Duplicate, Zakhm and Kareeb.

In 1999, he continued to record for major films including Hum Dil De Chuke Sanam, Hum Saath-Saath Hain, Biwi No. 1, Sirf Tum, Sarfarosh, Hum Aapke Dil Mein Rehte Hain, Kachche Dhaage, Hello Brother and Aa Ab Laut Chalen.

The late 1990s therefore represented a transition rather than an abrupt decline. Sanu remained a successful and recognizable singer, but the near-monopoly he had enjoyed over romantic male playback singing earlier in the decade had diminished.

=== Collaborations with female singers ===
During the 1990s, Kumar Sanu frequently collaborated with prominent female playback singers, particularly Alka Yagnik. Several sources noted that their duets were among the most popular of the decade. He also sang with Anuradha Paudwal, Kavita Krishnamurthy, and Sadhana Sargam.

=== 2000s–present ===
Sanu's presence in mainstream Bollywood declined during the 2000s, though he continued recording songs and performing live shows domestically and internationally.

In 2009, he was awarded the Padma Shri by the Government of India.

From the 2010s onward, Sanu focused on nostalgia concerts and stage events celebrating 1990s and early 2000s Bollywood music.

== Other works ==
Kumar Sanu has released several tribute albums of Kishore Kumar's songs including Kishore Ki Yaadein and the Yaadein Series, which he performed along with singers Abhijeet and Vinod Rathod.

In 2017, he, along with Sadhana Sargam, sang the title track of the 20th-century-based TV Series Yeh Un Dinon Ki Baat Hain, where he also made a cameo appearance. In 2019, he recorded a song for Star Plus's Kulfi Kumar Bajewala.

In Delhi's Karol Bagh, Sanu also founded a primary school for underprivileged children that provides students uniforms and books free of cost.

In 2022, Kumar Sanu collaborated with music director Vaibhav Saxena and two other singers for "Mohabbat Mein Tere Sanam" which was released and distributed worldwide by new-age Record Label Music Records.

== Personal life ==
Kumar Sanu's first marriage was to Rita Bhattacharya in 1986. The couple had three children. They separated in 1994 and later divorced.

Kumar Sanu married Saloni Bhattacharya in 2001. They have two daughters, Shannon K and Annabelle. Shannon K is a singer and was adopted by the couple.

== See also ==
- List of Indian playback singers
