= Dīvāneh, Kunduz =

Dīvāneh
- Location in Afghanistan
- Coordinates: 36°33′15″N 68°54′05″E
- Country: Afghanistan
- Province: Kunduz Province
- Time zone: UTC+4:30

Dīvāneh (Persian: ديوانه; also spelled Ḏiwāna, Divana, Dīwānah, or Diwana) is a village in Kunduz Province, Afghanistan.

== See also ==
- Kunduz Province
