= Maa Tujhhe Salaam =

Maa Tujhhe Salaam (lit. 'Salute to Mother [Mother India]') may refer to

- "Maa Tujhhe Salaam" (song), a patriotic album song from A. R. Rahman's 1997 album Vande Mataram
- Maa Tujhhe Salaam (2002 film), an Indian Hindi-language film starring Sunny Deol and directed by Tinnu Verma
