= Suraag – The Clue =

Indian crime television series (1999-2002)

- Written by: Arun Kumar Srivastava
- Directed by: Gautam Adhikari
- Starring: Sudesh Berry
- Country of origin: India
- Original language: Hindi
- No. of seasons: 1
- No. of episodes: 174

Production
- Camera setup: Multi-camera
- Running time: 35-40 minutes
- Production company: Sri Adhikari Brothers Television Network Ltd.

Original release
- Network: DD National
- Release: 14 June 1999 – 4 November 2002

Related
- Suraag 2.0

Suraag – The Clue is an Indian television mystery crime thriller/drama series that aired on DD National from 14 June 1999 to 4 November 2002. The series, starring Sudesh Berry as Inspector Bharat, it was directed by Gautam Adhikari and produced by Shri Adhikari Brothers Limited.

In the drama, Inspector and his assistant Inspector Srivastav formed a formidable partnership in solving crimes, mostly murder mysteries. This series, unlike previous detective-crime dramas in India, involved tackling of one case every episode and seldom were the story or case of one episode continued to the next one. Markand Adhikari was the producer.

After the drama ended, a new series called CID Officer (with same crew and cast) was aired on the same time. It was described by the media as "unofficial extension" of the Suraag.

In 2025, a reboot of the series called Suraag 2.0 was announced with Sai Ketan Rao as Inspector Shaurya Sastri for Waves, OTT platform of Prasar Bharati.

== Cast ==
=== Main ===
- Sudesh Berry as Crime Branch Inspector Bharat Chattopadhyay and Simon ( Episode 77 and 131)
- Amit Kapoor as Crime Branch Sub Inspector Shrivastav

=== Guest ===
- Phalguni Parekh as Shivani (Episode 1)
- Vishnu Sharma as
  - Professor Banerjee (Episode 1)
  - Naveen Tyagi ( Episode 48)
  - Professor Lal ( Episode 72)
  - Mr Das ( Episode 92)
  - Mittal Singh (Episode 165)
- Ramesh Tiwari as
  - Mr. Saxena (Episode 1)
  - D.C.P. (Episode 16 & Episode 130)
- Anand Abhyankar as Inspector Mohan (Episode 1)
- Raj Premi as
  - Raj (Episode 1)
  - Aashish Mehra (Episode 166)
    - Raghav Saxena (After Plastic Surgery) (Episode 166)
- Uday Tikekar as Inspector Ajay Chattopadhyay: Inspector Bharat's father (Episode 1)
- Arun Bali as
  - Hariram "Hariya" (Episode 2)
  - Mr. Rao "Khan Mohammad" (Episode 22)
  - Arvind Ahuja (Episode 29)
  - Mahesh Sarang (Episode 42)
- Amita Khopkar as Bindu (Episode 2)
- Sudhir Mittoo as Ranjeet (Episode 7) Shaukat Khan ( Episode 27)
- Shailendra Srivastav as Shankar Jadhav (Episode 2)
- Ravindra Berde as Manohar Jadhav (Episode 2)
- Brijgopal as
  - Rajan Chaudhary (Episode 2)
  - Pappu Hitler (Episode 18)
  - Hari Chhabria (Episode 26)
  - Inspector Shahane
- Mulraj Rajda as Girdharilal (Episode 2)
- Kuldeep Sharma as
  - Raghav (Episode 2)
  - Public Prosecutor (Episode 14)
  - Mr. Damle (Episode 19)
  - Harish (Episode 28)
  - Advocate Anil Saxena (Episode 49)
  - Champak (Episode 55)
  - Jagat Narayan (Episode 167)
- Manoj Joshi as Kumar Mohanty (Episode 3)
- Makrand Deshpande as Jagan Mohanty (Episode 3)
- Nasir Sheikh as Manish (Episode 3)
- Nupur Alankar Joshi as
  - Rehana Kumar Mohanty (Episode 3)
  - Smita Wadkar (Episode 28)
  - Dr Anushka Amar Choudhary (Episode 129)
- Kedarnath Saigal as
  - Mr. Ajmera (Episode 3)
  - Judge (Episode 14)
- Sharad Vyas as
  - Mr. Desai (Episode 3)
  - Chuttan (Episode 4)
- Savita Prabhune as Shreekant's Mother (Episode 4)
- Kuldeep Mallik as
  - Shreekant (Episode 4)
  - Rahul (Episode 20)
  - Rajat Roy/Samir Dharkar(Episode 30)
  - Jeevan Malhotra (Episode 38)
  - Aditya Ram (Episode 89)
  - Vishal Malhotra (Episode 120)
  - Sameer Kothari (Episode 169)
- Reena Kapoor as
  - Sunanda (Episode 4)
  - Roopa Kapadia (Episode 156)
- Hemant Choudhary as Ramakant's Son (Episode 4)
- Mahaveer Shah as Ramakant (Episode 4)
- Rajdev Jamdade as Sub Inspector Dhardhar (Episode 4)
- Imran Khan as
  - Imran Khan (Episode 5)
  - Rakesh Dev (Episode 21)
  - Keshav (Episode 39)
- Raza Murad as
  - Retired Major Hamidullah Khan (Episode 5)
  - Pratap Rai (Episode 167)
    - Impostor Pratap Rai (Episode 167)
- Ragesh Asthana as
  - Salim (Episode 5)
  - P. K. Saxena (Episode 40)
  - Kailash Keshav Chawla (Episode 58)
- Jeetendra Trehan as
  - Captain Shaheed Khan (Episode 5)
  - Jayant (Episode 21)
- Anita Hassanandani as
  - Razia Khan (Episode 5)
  - Natasha Choudhary (Episode 33)
- Deepshikha Nagpal as
  - Inspector Sneha Verma (Episode 6)
  - Tanya Rai (Episode 160)
    - Champa (Episode 160)
      - Inspector Kiran Mehra (Episode 160)
        - Impostor Tanya Rai (After Plastic Surgery) (Episode 160)
- Rishabh Shukla as
  - Shreekant (Episode 6)
  - Dr. Amarkant Ahuja (Episode 20)
  - Chandan Sinha (Episode 41)
  - Rajat Verma (Episode 149)
    - Akash (After Plastic Surgery) (Episode 149)
- Sharmilee Raj as
  - Sandhya (Episode 6)
  - Alisha (Episode 55)
- Anil Dhawan as
  - Vishal Grover (Episode 7)
  - Kamalkant Sahay (Episode 31)
- Navni Parihar as Kamini Vishal Grover (Episode 7)
- Dinesh Kaushik as
  - Mr. Kriplani (Episode 7)
  - Rohit Patwardhan (Episode 28)
- Rajlakshmi Solanki as Ritu Khanna (Episode 7)
- Akhil Ghai as Anand Kumar (Episode 7)
- Suhas Khandke as
  - Mr. Nayyar (Episode 7)
  - Dr. Prakashchandra Patwardhan (Episode 11)
  - DK Gupta (Episode 55)
  - Mr. Kabra (Episode 153)
- Afshan Khan as
  - Disha (Episode 8)
  - Payal Jeevan Malhotra (Episode 38)
- Anjana Mumtaz as Ranjeet's Mother (Episode 8)
- Pradeep Kabra as
  - Salim (Episode 8)
  - Hari Chhabria's Bodyguard (Episode 26)
  - Ibrahim Qazi (Episode 33)
  - Iqbal Qureshi (Episode 37)
  - Usman Rizvi (Episode 60)
- Avinash Kharshikar as Pradeep Patwardhan (Episode 8)
- Sudheer Mittoo as
  - Ranjeet (Episode 8)
  - Shaukat Khan (Episode 28)
  - Zuber Khan (Episode 156)
- Shikha Swaroop as
  - Seema (Episode 8)
  - Ashalata Rahul Jaiswal (Episode 16)
- Vijay Aidasani as
  - Aashish Khurana (Episode 9)
  - Kewal Sinha (Episode 35)
    - Shekhar Sinha (Episode 35)
  - Advocate Akash Sadana (Episode 163)
- Sudha Chandran as Sapna Aashish Khurana (Episode 9)
- Javed Khan as
  - Sanjeev (Episode 9)
  - Rajeshwar (Episode 21)
  - Mahesh Kumar (Episode 38)
  - Abhijeet Roy (Episode 153)
- Pramatesh Mehta as Dentist (Episode 9)
- Amita Nangia as Prameela Neelesh Dave (Episode 9)
- Surendrapal Singh as
  - Dr. R. K. Verma (Episode 9)
  - Ajeet Kumar (Episode 24)
- Meenakshi Verma as Vasanti Chauhan (Episode 10)
- Siddharth Randeria as Manohar Shinde (Episode 10)
- Jeet Upendra as
  - Rajan Shinde (Episode 10)
  - Aashish (Episode 159)
- Vijayendra Ghatge as Dr. Sudheer Malik (Episode 11)
- Kiran Juneja as
  - Nisha Sudheer Malik (Episode 11)
  - Renu (Episode 155)
- Utkarsha Naik as Dr. Basu (Episode 11)
- Raju Kher as Rajeev Lal (Episode 12)
- Dilip Thadeshwar as Rahul Lal (Episode 12)
- Jaya Bhattacharya as Shweta Narang (Episode 12)
- Goga Kapoor as
  - G. D. Narang (Episode 12)
  - Tantrik Awgadh Bangalee (Episode 57)
- Murli Sharma as
  - Inspector Vicky Tiwari (Episode 12)
  - Inspector Mohan
- Mac Mohan as Raghav (Episode 12)
- Santosh Shukla as
  - Shreekant (Episode 13)
  - Vijayendra Saxena (Episode 21)
  - Bunty (Episode 39)
  - Kamalakant Dwiveja (Episode 164)
  - Rahul (Episode 174)
- Suraj Thapar as Anand (Episode 13)
- Prashant Bhatt as Vishal Saxena (Episode 13)
- Sudhir as
  - Ranjeet Saxena (Episode 13)
  - Hasmukh Bajaj (Episode 27)
- Tasneem Sheikh as Ritu Chaudhary (Episode 14)
- Sumeet Saigal as Inspector Vikram (Episode 14)
- Achyut Potdar as Police Commissioner (Episode 14)
- Navin Nischol as Judge Chaudhary (Episode 14)
- Sujata Thakkar as
  - Nisha Chaudhary (Episode 14)
  - Deepa Vikram Nadkar (Episode 24)
  - Rachana Abhijeet Roy (Episode 153)
  - Shalini Pratap Rai (Episode 167)
- Suneel Nagar as
  - Rahul Jaiswal (Episode 16)
  - Dr. Alok Srivastav (Episode 35)
  - Jagat Ahuja (Episode 154)
- Nayan Bhatt as
  - Savitri (Episode 16)
  - Nanda Dinkar Pandey (Episode 57)
- Jaywant Wadkar as Bheema (Episode 16)
- Tinnu Anand as Terrorist Leader (Episode 17)
- Rammohan Sharma as
  - Police Commissioner (Episode 17 & Episode 37)
  - Keshav Chawla / Gajendra Singh Dongra (Episode 58)
- Naushad Abbas as
  - Terrorist (Episode 17)
  - Pappu Hitler's Goon (Episode 18)
  - Yogendra (Episode 29)
- Ramesh Goel as Jagdev (Episode 17)
- Deepak Parashar as Dr. Kundan Mehra (Episode 18)
- Pramod Moutho as Brigadier S. K. Thakur (Episode 19)
- Neha Joshi as
  - Nikita Chopra (Episode 20)
  - Sonali Sharma (Episode 56)
- R. S. Chopra as
  - R. K. Chopra (Episode 20)
  - Commissioner (Episode 58)
- Bob Christo as Smuggling Gang Leader (Episode 21)
- Brownie Parashar as
  - Raghuveer (Episode 21)
  - Rana (Episode 161)
- Beena Banerjee as
- Mrs. Dev "Rani Sahiba" (Episode 21)
- Professor Sinha (Episode 61)
- Kishwar Merchant as
  - Mandira (Episode 21)
  - Shaina Bhatnagar (Episode 157)
- Pradeep Shukla as
  - Cultural Minister (Episode 21)
  - Mr. Bhatia (Episode 42)
- Kamal Adib as
  - Professor Aditya Burman (Episode 21)
  - Mr. Batra (Episode 171)
- Tony Mirchandani as
  - Ravikant Nair (Episode 22)
  - Ranjeet Rana (Episode 36)
  - Kanu Sharma (Episode 56)
- Adarsh Gautam as
  - Raj Malhotra (Episode 23)
  - Dinesh Prabhakar (Episode 34)
  - Dr. Deepak Batra (Episode 165)
- Usha Bachani as Bobby (Episode 23)
- Barkha Madan as
  - Ruby Ajeet Kumar (Episode 24)
  - Rehana (Episode 36)
  - Malati Mahesh Sarang (Episode 42)
- Raymon Singh as Sania (Episode 24)
- Dharmesh Vyas as
  - Vikram Nadkar (Episode 24)
  - Dushyant (Episode 153)
- Girija Shankar as Keshav Katre "K. K." (Episode 25)
- Dinesh Hingoo as Mr. Roopani (Episode 27)
- Rajeev Verma as Judge Jugalkishore Mehta (Episode 28)
- Ali Khan as Ranjeet (Episode 29)
- Lalit Parimoo as
  - Shubham Karmakar (Episode 29)
  - Rajat Mishra (Episode 173)
- Maleeka Ghai as Aarti Gupta (Episode 30)
- Sheeba Agarwal as
  - Neelam Kamalkant Sahay (Episode 31)
  - Christina Columbus (Episode 40)
- Lata Haya as Dolly Peter (Episode 31)
- B. Shantanu as Dharam Malhotra (Episode 31)
- Subbiraj Kakkar as
  - Narendra Kapoor (Episode 32)
  - Tahir Khan (Episode 60)
  - Retired Judge Somraj Dikshit (Episode 163)
- Rio Kapadia as Jasvendra Kapoor (Episode 32)
- Seema Kapoor as Inspector Shailaja Sohal (Episode 32)
- Ajeet Mehra as
  - Shyam Hemchandani (Episode 32)
  - Manmohan Ahuja (Episode 154)
- Rohini Hattangadi as Judge Sangeeta Shashank Choudhary (Episode 33)
- Vineet Kumar as Shreedhar Choudhary (Episode 33)
- Jaya Mathur as
  - Sanjana Alok Srivastav (Episode 35)
  - Mohini (Episode 162)
- Shashi Sharma as Rani Kewal Sinha (Episode 35)
- Nawab Shah as
  - Raj Premi (Episode 35)
  - Kshitij Kumar (Episode 55)
- Kamal Malik as Anand (Episode 36)
- Rajesh Puri as
  - Heerachand (Episode 36)
  - Champaklal Johri (Episode 157)
- Firdaus Mevawala as Inspector (Episode 36)
- Suresh Bhagwat as Krishnakant (Episode 37)
- Jayshree T. as Lalita (Episode 38)
- Shivani Gosain as Simi (Episode 39)
- Shraddha Sharma as
  - Suman (Episode 40)
  - Priya (Episode 163)
  - Divya Sameer Kothari (Episode 169)
- Suraj Chaddha as Rajeev Ramniklal (Episode 41)
- Vaishnavi Mahant as
  - Sanjana (Episode 27)
  - Rama Rajeev Ramniklal (Episode 41)
  - Yogita Sahni (Episode 61)
- Zaheed Ali as Gaurav "Guru" (Episode 162)
- Vinod Kapoor as Mohanlal (Episode 160)
- Amit Behl as
  - Dharmesh Kumar and Deepak Kumar (dual role) (Episode 54)
  - Karan Kohli (Episode 158)
- Neelam Singh as
  - Rashmi Rai (Episode 167)
  - Riya Batra (Episode 171)
- Lalit Tiwari as Prakash Lalwani (Episode 168)
- Swati Verma as
  - Naina Jivanlal Khurana (Episode 59)
  - Shreya Ghosh (Episode 159)
- Kaushal Kapoor as Sub Inspector Chauhan (Episode 155)
- Rajtilak as Judge Rajgopal (Episode 159)
- Gajendra Chauhan as
  - Jivanlal Khurana (Episode 59)
  - Inspector Thakur (Episode 155)
- Lalitesh Jha as
  - Niranjan Ahuja (Episode 154)
  - Advocate Jagat Gulati (Episode 158)
- Amit Divetia as Dheeru (Episode 156)
- Sanjeev Siddharth as Chhota Qasim (Episode 156)
- Aarati Nagpal as Shalini (Episode 174)
- Shiva Rindani as Diwakar (Episode 172)
- Mona Parekh as
  - Urmila Niranjan Ahuja (Episode 154)
  - Kamala Rajat Mishra (Episode 173)
- Rajendra Chawla as
  - Mr. Mehra (Episode 158)
  - Kamalakant Mishra (Episode 168)
- Chetanya Adib as Akash (Episode 149)
- Alauddin Khan as Usman (Episode 156)
- Parul Yadav as Kanta (Episode 154)
- Deepak Bhatia as Raghav (Episode 154)
- Gufi Paintal as
  - R. K. Dhanraj (Episode 153)
  - Dr. K. K. Ahuja (Episode 157)
  - Govardhan Lal (Episode 161)
  - Retired Judge Raichand (Episode 170)
- Mithilesh Chaturvedi as Mr. Ahuja (Episode 164)
- Anil Nagrath as Mr. Narayan (Episode 164)
- Nagesh Bhonsle as Kali Singh (Episode 151)
- Vaidehi Amrute as Ketki Rajat Verma (Episode 149)
- Rahul Sood as Meghraj Gupta (Episode 164)
- Manav Sohal as
  - Guddu Dhanraj (Episode 153)
  - Prem (Episode 160)
  - Advocate Krishnakant Bhatia (Episode 166)
  - Ranjeet Ahuja (Episode 172)
- Shashi Puri as Dharmesh Bajaj (Episode 162)
- Bhumika Seth as Devika Thakral (Episode 153)
- Ashok Banthia as Mr. Thakral (Episode 153)
- Raja Kapse as Rajdev (Episode 153)
- Suneel Sinha as Rajat Verma (Episode 155)
- Pankaj Dheer as Rajeev Ranjan (Episode 156)
- Ravi Gossain as Rakesh Kumar "Rocky" (Episode 159)
- Sumeet Kaul as Harish Lal (Episode 161)
- Sanjay Swaraj as
  - Manoj Kumar Singh (Episode 165)
  - Bhavesh Raichand (Episode 170)
- Govind Khatri as
  - Mukesh (Episode 166)
  - Suneel Banerjee (Episode 173)
- Manish Garg as
  - Sanjeev Rai (Episode 167)
  - Jagat (Episode 171)
- Bakul Bhatt as
  - Assistant Sub Inspector Diwakar (Episode 168)
  - Balveer (Episode 170)
- Suneel Mattoo as Alok Verma (Episode 169)
- Raju Shrestha as Aniruddh Kumar (Episode 170)
- Manish Sharma as Raj (Episode 171)
- Vijay Bhatia as Vikas "Vicky" (Episode 171)
- Rupali Ganguly as Shweta (Episode 172)
- Ranjeev Verma as Mr. Kohli (Episode 173)
- Naveen Bawa as Rakesh (Episode 174)

=== Episode-wise cast ===
Ep 1: Inspector Bharat's origin story:

- Phalguni Parekh as Shivani
- Vishnu Sharma as Professor Banerjee
- Ramesh Tiwari as Mr. Saxena
- Uday Tikekar as Inspector Ajay Chattopadhyay: Inspector Bharat's father
- Anand Abhyankar as Inspector Mohan
- Raj Premi as Raj

Ep 2: Dead body in a suitcase:

- Arun Bali as Hariram "Hariya"
- Amita Khopkar as Bindu
- Shailendra Srivastav as Shankar Jadhav
- Ravindra Berde as Manohar Jadhav
- Brijgopal as Rajan Chaudhary
- Mulraj Rajda as Girdharilal
- Kuldeep Sharma as Raghav

Ep 3: Murder of film-maker's father:

- Manoj Joshi as Kumar Mohanty
- Makrand Deshpande as Jagan Mohanty
- Nasir Sheikh as Manish
- Nupur Alankar Joshi as Rehana Kumar Mohanty
- Kedarnath Saigal as Mr. Ajmera
- Sharad Vyas as Mr. Desai

Ep 4: Mysterious death of the brides:

- Kuldeep Mallik as Shreekant
- Savita Prabhune as Shreekant's mother
- Sharad Vyas as Chuttan
- Reena Kapoor as Sunanda
- Mahaveer Shah as Ramakant
- Hemant Choudhary as Ramakant's son
- Rajdev Jamdade as Sub Inspector Dhardhar

Ep 5: The confidential file:

- Imran Khan as Imran Khan
- Raza Murad as Retired Major Hamidullah Khan
- Ragesh Asthana as Salim
- Jeetendra Trehan as Captain Shaheed Khan
- Anita Hassanandani as Razia Khan

Ep 6: Woman visitor on a rainy night:

- Rishabh Shukla as Shreekant
- Deepshikha Nagpal as Inspector Sneha Verma
- Manorama as neighbour
- Sharmilee Raj as Sandhya

Ep 54: The hand with six fingers:

- Amit Behl as Dharmesh Kumar and Deepak Kumar (dual role)
- ? as Anjali

Ep 55: Attack on Film star

- Nawab Shah as Kshitij Kumar
- Amit Bhalla as Film director Prasad
- Suhas Khandke as DK Gupta
- Sharmilee Raj as Alisha
- Kuldeep Sharma as Champak

Ep 56: A murder inside closed room:

- ? as Virendra Sharma
- Neha Joshi as Sonali Sharma
- Raman Khatri as Nirmal
- Tony Mirchandani as Kanu Sharma
- ? as servant Ram Bharose
- ? as Advocate Rohit Jha

Ep 57: The tattoo murders

- Lalit Tiwari as Raghuveer Chaudhary
- Goga Kapoor as Awgadh Bangalee (Black magician)
- Nayan Bhatt as Maid servant Nanda Dinkar Pandey

Ep 58: To catch a smuggler:

- Rammohan Sharma as Keshav Chawla / Gajendra Singh Dongra
- Ragesh Asthana as Kailash Keshav Chawla
- Kainaaz Parvees as Nita Kailash Chawla / Nazneen
- R. S. Chopra as Commissioner

Ep 59: Murder on a rainy night (Release date: 24 July 2000)

- Surendra Pal as Jivanlal Khurana / Dr. Jagan Nath
- Zahid Ali as Manoj Pandey
- Kishori Shahane as Poonam Jivanlal Khurana
- Gajendra Chauhan as Jivanlal Khurana
- Swati Verma as Naina Jivanlal Khurana

Ep 60: Painting of the missing boys (Release date: 31 July 2000)

- Subbiraj Kakkar as Tahir Khan (based on M. F. Husain)
- Pradeep Kabra as Usman Rizvi
- Dharmendra Rana as Bobby Bhatt
- ? as Sunil Diwan

Ep 61: The stolen idol (Release date: 7 August 2000)

- Beena Banerjee as Professor Sinha
- Vaishnavi Mahant as Yogita Sahni
- Yusuf Hussain as Jagan Dixit
- ? as Minister

== Reboot ==
In 2025, a revival of the series called Suraag 2.0 was announced with Sai Ketan Rao in lead as Inspector Shaurya Sastri.
