= Parwane =

- Film poster
- Directed by: Ashok Gaikwad
- Written by: Tanveer Khan
- Produced by: Vijay K. Ranglani
- Starring: Avinash Wadhavan; Siddharth Ray; Shilpa Shirodkar; Paresh Rawal; Gulshan Grover
- Music by: Anand–Milind
- Distributed by: Shalimar Films
- Release date: 12 November 1993
- Country: India
- Language: Hindi

Parwane is a Bollywood action film released in 1993 starring Avinash Wadhavan, Siddharth Ray, Shilpa Shirodkar and Paresh Rawal. The story is written by Tanveer Khan and music is composed by Anand–Milind.

== Plot ==
Pune-based Police Inspector Basheer Khan warns four Gokhale College's trouble-makers, Avinash Malhotra, Henry D'Souza, Avtar Singh, and Aslam, to behave themselves after he witnesses them molesting a girl, and getting into fisticuffs with some men who tried to stop them. The foursome successfully pass their exams and return to their respective homes – little knowing that soon they will be thrown into conflict with not only Basheer Khan, who has been transferred to Bombay, but also with Sub-Inspectors Tawde and Damodar; and that two of them are fated to die violent deaths, and the remainder of the two may face the death penalty for homicide.

== Cast ==
- Siddharth Ray – Henry D'Souza
- Shilpa Shirodkar – Mona S. Saxena
- Avinash Wadhavan-Avinash Malhotra
- Varsha Usgaonkar-Suzie
- Paresh Rawal-Naag Reddy
- Gulshan Grover-Rama N. Reddy
- Ajinkya Deo-Aslam
- Tinnu Anand-D'Souza
- Asha Sharma-Asha Jain

• Aruna Irani-Veerabai

== Soundtrack ==
The music of the film is composed by Anand–Milind and lyrics are penned by Sameer.

| # | Title | Singer(s) |
|---|---|---|
| 1 | "Ye Ladki Badi Magroor Hai" | Kumar Sanu |
| 2 | "Jee Chahta Hai Tujhe Kiss Karoon" | Kumar Sanu, Kavita Krishnamurthy |
| 3 | "Jis Baatse Darte Thhe Woh Baat Ho Gai" | Udit Narayan, Kavita Krishnamurthy |
| 4 | "Ab aaye hai" | Amit Kumar, Sadhana Sargam, Udit Narayan |
| 5 | "Dunk Maare Bichuda" | Kavita Krishnamurthy, Purnima |
| 6 | "Koi nahi mita" | Amit Kumar, Arun Bakshi |

== Release ==
The film was well received by critics.
