= Bohot Pyaar Karte Hai =

Indian television series

- Genre: Drama; Romance
- Created by: Sandiip Sikcand
- Starring: Karan V Grover; Sayli Salunkhe
- Opening theme: Bahut Pyar Karte Hain by Anuradha Paudwal
- Country of origin: India
- Original language: Hindi
- No. of seasons: 1
- No. of episodes: 133

Production
- Producers: Fazila Allana; Sandiip Sikcand
- Running time: 20-24 minutes
- Production companies: Sol Production; Sandiip Films

Original release
- Network: Star Bharat; Disney+ Hotstar
- Release: 5 July – 10 December 2022

Bohot Pyaar Karte Hai (transl. Love You So Much) is an Indian Hindi-language romantic drama television series that premiered from 5 July 2022 to 10 December 2022 on Star Bharat. Produced by Fazila Allana and Sandiip Sikcand under Sol Production and Sandiip Films, it stars Karan V Grover, Sayli Salunkhe and Kiara Sadh.

== Plot ==
The show is about a girl named Indu who lives with her younger sister and parents. Indu loves a guy named Mahesh and wants to go meet him and propose to him for marriage. She goes to meet him with her dad but finds that he has already married someone else. Mahesh insults her and beats her father to which she breaks up with him. While she is returning from there; she meets a pregnant woman on a bus and asks her to come with her. On the bus, the woman delivers her baby and asks Indu to hold her for some time. When Indu wakes she finds out that the woman has left her baby there and ran away. Already trying to overcome her breakup she decides to leave the kid at the station but couldn't and she takes her in. Her mother is against her decision but Indu wants to keep it because the baby was a new hope for her, she names the baby Zoon.

=== Five years later ===
Zoon is five years old now but because of an accident, she can't walk without a leg brace. Zoon wants a father and keeps asking her mother to get her a father and Indu lies to her every time because she doesn't want her to know that she is adopted. Then comes Ritesh Malhotra, a superstar. Zoon likes Ritesh and wants to meet him. On the release of his new film, Ritesh comes to a theatre and saves Zoon when she falls from the second floor of the theatre.

== Cast ==
=== Main ===
- Karan V Grover as Ritesh Malhotra: Indu's husband; Zoon's adoptive father
- Sayali Salunkhe as Indu Raina: Sunita and Rajendra's daughter; Prashant and Anjali's sister; Ritesh's wife; Zoon's adoptive mother
- Kiara Sadh as Zoon Raina: Kadambari's daughter; Indu and Ritesh's adoptive daughter

=== Recurring ===
- Shireen Mirza as Kamna Pankaj Malhotra: Padma's younger sister; Pankaj's second wife; Sameer and Vivan’s maternal aunt/foster mother; Ritesh's aunt
- Sanjay Swaraj as Pankaj Malhotra: Deep's elder brother; Padma's ex-husband; Kamna's husband; Sameer and Vivaan’s father; Ritesh's uncle
- Kushagre Dua as Sameer Malhotra: Pankaj and Padma’s son; Kamna’s foster son; Vivaan's elder brother; Ritesh's cousin; Kadambari's husband
- Aryan Arora as Vivan Malhotra: Pankaj and Padma’s son; Kamna’s biological nephew/stepson; Sameer's younger brother; Ritesh's cousin; Anjali's lover
- Amit Singh Thakur as Rajendra Raina: Sunita's husband; Prashant, Indu and Anjali's father; Zoon's adoptive grandfather; Asha and Ritesh's father-in-law
- Nikita Tiwari as Asha Bakshi Raina: Nima and Vinod's daughter; Kadambari's step-sister; Prashant's widow; Zoon's adoptive aunt; Vivek's love interest
- Trishaan Maini as Vivek: Indu's best friend; Asha's lover
- Riya Soni as Anjali "Anju" Raina: Sunita and Rajendra's daughter; Prashant and Indu's sister; Zoon's adoptive aunt; Rahul and Vivaan’s love interest
- Neelam Pathania as Sunita Raina: Rajendra's wife; Prashant, Indu and Anjali's mother; Zoon's adoptive grandmother; Asha and Ritesh's mother-in-law
- Pankit Thakker as Deep Malhotra: Pankaj's younger brother; Dolly's husband; Ritesh, Sameer and Vivaan's uncle
- Priyamvada Singh as Dolly Deep Malhotra: Deep's wife; Ritesh, Sameer and Vivaan's aunt
- Ali Khan as Rahul: Ritesh's friend and manager; Anjali's lover
- Aparna Aparajit as Mrs. Malhotra: Ritesh's mother; Indu's mother-in-law; Zoon's adoptive grandmother
- Prerna Wanvari as Kadambari Patel Malhotra: Vinod's daughter; Asha's step-sister; Zoon's biological mother; Sameer's wife
- Ribbhu Mehra as Mahesh: Indu's former love interest
- Keertida Mistry

== Production ==
=== Development ===
The show title is based on the song of the sane name, from the 1991 film Saajan. The series marks second collaboration between Karan Grover and Pankit Thakker after Bahu Hamari Rajni Kant (2016).

=== Casting ===
Sayali Salunkhe was cast as the female lead Indu, a single mother. Karan Grover was cast as the male lead, in the role of a film star.

=== Filming and release ===
Bohot Pyaar Karte Hai's shooting began in June 2022. The first promo arrived the same month, featuring Salunkhe as Indu. The series premiered from 5 July 2022 on Star Bharat.

== Awards and nominations ==
Year	Award	Category	Recipient	Result	Ref.
2022	Indian Television Academy Awards	Popular Actress (Drama)	Sayali Salukhe	Nominated	
2022	Indian Television Academy Awards	Popular Actor (Drama)	Karan Grover	Nominated	
2022	Indian Television Academy Awards	Popular Serial (Drama)	Bohot Pyaar Karte Hai	Nominated	

== See also ==
- List of programs broadcast by Star Bharat
