= Chaani =

- Directed by: V. Shantaram
- Written by: Chintamani Tryambak Khanolkar
- Produced by: V. Shantaram
- Starring: Ranjana; Siddharth Ray
- Cinematography: Shivaji Sawant
- Edited by: V. Shantaram
- Music by: Hridaynath Mangeshkar
- Release date: 1977
- Running time: 124 min.
- Country: India
- Language: Marathi

Chaani is a 1977 Indian Marathi-language film directed by V. Shantaram. It is based on novel written by Chintamani Tryambak Khanolkar. The songs in this film are written by renowned Marathi poet Chintamani Tryambak Khanolkar under pseudonym Arti Prabhu. V. Shantaram's wife Sandhya Shantaram was worked as assistant director for this film.

== Plot ==
The narrative centers on Shevanta, who is raped by a foreign officer in a tribal jungle. She subsequently gives birth to a baby girl, but the local villagers kill Shevanta for giving birth to an illegitimate child. A villager named Gangaram takes custody of the orphaned baby and names her Chaani. As Chaani grows up, she becomes a lovable and hardworking young woman who actively helps the villagers; despite this, the community considers her a curse and views her as unlucky.

Her life changes when Dinu, a school-going kid, befriends her. Dinu treats Chaani with a level of respect she has never received from others, calls her his sister, and the two develop a strong bond. Later, a local man named Appa Savkar lures Chaani. Because of her vulnerability, Chaani believes that he genuinely loves her, finding it difficult to understand that he is actually using her. Throughout these events, Dinu's bond with Chaani remains so strong that he continuously prays for her to escape her circumstances and marry a good person.

== Cast ==
- Ranjana as Chaani
- Siddharth Ray as Dinkar
- Yashwant Dutt as Dharmadas
- Arvind Deshpande as Pitambar Samant
- Gauri Kamat as Pitambar's wife
- Prem Kumar as Gangadhar
- Durga Senjit as Pitambar's mother
- Kamini as Pitambar's sister-in-law
- Suhas Bhalekar as Master Athavale
- Tom Alter as Forest Officer

== Music ==
1. "Ho Kasam Teri Maa Ka" - Manna Dey
2. "Mai To Jaungi Jaungi Re Us Paar" - Lata Mangeshkar
3. "Tumhi Ho Mere Apne Yaha" - Lata Mangeshkar
4. "Do Teen Pahad Pahad" - Usha Mangeshkar
