= Suraag 2.0 =

Indian crime thriller television series

- Genre: Crime; Thriller; Suspense; Mystery
- Created by: Gautham Adhikari; Markand Adhikari
- Screenplay by: Sarim Momin; Rehan Khan
- Creative director: Rehan Khan
- Starring: Sai Ketan Rao; Jigyasa Singh; Sudesh Berry
- Opening theme: Suraag Theme
- Composers: Krishn Trivedi; Srijan Vinay Vaishnav
- Country of origin: India
- Original language: Hindi
- No. of seasons: 1
- No. of episodes: 22

Production
- Producers: Kailashnath Adhikari; Ravi Gautham Adhikari
- Editor: Amey Godkar
- Camera setup: Multi-camera
- Running time: 45 minutes
- Production companies: Sri Adhikari Brothers & Doordarshan

Original release
- Network: DD National
- Release: 21 September 2026 – present

Related
- Suraag – The Clue

Suraag 2.0 is an Indian Hindi-language crime thriller series that premiered on DD National on 21 September 2026. Produced by Kailashnath Adhikari and Ravi Adhikari under Sri Adhikari Brothers, it stars Sai Ketan Rao, Jigyasa Singh and Sudesh Berry. It is a Reboot of Suraag – The Clue.

== Cast ==
=== Main ===
- Sai Ketan Rao as Inspector Shaurya Sastri
- Jigyasa Singh as Nidhima Raje
- Sudesh Berry as Inspector Bharat

=== Recurring ===
- Gauri Karnik as SHO Abida Shaikh
- Jaywant Wadkar as Constable Vinayak "Vayu" Gaikwad
- Manu Bisht as Constable Chandrika Makrandi
- Karan Harplani as Cyber Expert Prada
- Shivani Thorat as Cyber Expert Jaanki
- Sakshi Nahta as Dr. Divya, Forensic Expert
- Pradeep Vijay as Inspector Badal Jhadav
- Bushra Shaikh as Myra
- Manish Tandon as Inspector Wajid Khan
- Anjana Nathan as Maheshwari/ Imam Babera
- Kajol Gianani Rani Raje
- Darpan Srivatsava
- Praannay Naarrayan
- Rohan Suman as Raghu Chanakya
- Amol Bawdekar
- Nitin Tiwari as Murli

== Production ==
=== Development ===
In August 2026, Ravi Adhikari announced to produce reboot of Suraag. In September 2026, DD National unveiled first look the poster Suraag 2.0.

=== Casting ===
In June 2025, Sai Ketan Rao was confirmed to play Inspector Shaurya Sastri. Jigyasa Singh also confirmed to play Nidhima Raje. Sudesh Berry also returned to the show to portray Inspector Bharat.
