= Chashni (TV series) =

2023 Indian television series

- Genre: Drama
- Created by: Sandiip Sikcand
- Based on: Tapur Tupur
- Screenplay by: Heena Kholi Khan
- Story by: Vandana Tiwari; Sidra Iqbal; Sonakshi Khendelwaal; Nirbhay Singh
- Directed by: Sameer Kulkarni
- Creative directors: Sandiip Sikcand; Dolienn Diaz; Dhaval Thakkar; Nimisha Abraham
- Starring: Amandeep Sidhu; Srishti Singh; Sai Ketan Rao
- Theme music composer: Shubham Sundaram
- Composer: Shivangi Bhayana
- Country of origin: India
- Original language: Hindi
- No. of seasons: 1
- No. of episodes: 81

Production
- Producers: Sandiip Sikcand; Veena Sikcand
- Cinematography: Sadanand Pillai
- Editor: Sameer Gandhi
- Camera setup: Multi-camera
- Running time: 22 minutes
- Production company: SOL Productions

Original release
- Network: StarPlus
- Release: 9 March – 28 May 2023

Chashni (transl. Sweet Syrup) is an Indian Hindi-language television drama series premiered on 9 March 2023 on StarPlus and streams digitally on Disney+ Hotstar. It stars Amandeep Sidhu, Srishti Singh and Sai Ketan Rao in the lead roles. It ended on 28 May 2023.

== Plot ==
Chandni Chopra and Roshni Chopra are sisters who live without their parents and are bought up by their maternal and paternal grandmothers, Vandana and Bindu. Despite having contrasting personalities, both the sisters share a lovely bond. Their family is always insulted and berated by the society due to Sanjay (their father) work rivalry misunderstanding. Chandni trusts her father and chooses to make him proud while Roshni is her polar opposite. Roshni has a boyfriend Nirbhay, while Manav, who is betrayed by his wife and has a daughter, loves Chandni. Chandni has constant clashes with her neighbour Raunaq Babbar (Reddy).

With Manav's help Chandni gets a job in fire department but is always detested in her office due to Sanjay's incident. Being the first woman firefighter she faces a lot of hurdles in her office but Manav supports her. Soon it is found that Sanjay is alive and is in care home, taken care by Chandni and Roshni's grandmothers. Chandni saves her father and takes him home with help of Raunaq, Manav and Nirbhay, but Roshni cuts all the ties with Sanjay in anger and due to the insults faced by them in the society. Soon, it is proven that Sanjay is innocent and real culprit is Vikas (Nirbhay's father). Chandni accepts Nirbhay and Roshni's relationship. Raunaq earns Chopra's trust & slowly Chandni falls in love with him, but he turns vengeful upon his sister's death and believes it to be caused by Chandni. He teams up with Natasha to destroy Chandni and Roshni's happiness; in the process he kills Nirbhay and makes Roshni hate Chandni.

Two months later, Roshni marries Sumer Babbar (Raunaq's father) and brings back Raunaq to the house earning Sumer's trust. Soon, Chandni crosses paths with Roshni and marries Raunaq with help of Manav in order to win back Roshni, save her and take revenge on Raunaq. Later, it is revealed that Raunaq hates his father as he believes that he is the murderer of his mother Chitra. Soon, Chandni becomes close with Vimla, Sumer and Nisha (Sanjot's daughter) in that house. Chandni starts receiving threatening letters about Roshni. Nisha falls in love with Manav but he rejects her making her lonely and depressed. Slowly Raunaq and Chandni begin to fall in love but Raunaq still doesn't accept her. Later, Raunaq and Chandni catch Vimla red-handed while sending the threat letter where she reveals that, it is Sanjot (Sumer's Sister) who wants to kill Roshni and is the murderer of Chitra for taking over the business. Feeling guilty, Raunaq reconciles with his father and joins hands with Chandni to save Roshni. While trying to expose Sanjot, Chandni proves her innocence in front of Raunaq about his sister's death and they together expose Sanjot in front of the family. Out of guilt, Raunaq brings Chandni and Roshni together. Raunaq confesses his love to Chandni and they happily reconcile. The show ends with Roshni becoming pregnant and the family celebrating Nisha's birthday.

== Cast ==
=== Main ===
- Amandeep Sidhu as Chandni Babbar (née Chopra): A firefighter; Sanjay and Saroj's elder daughter; Roshni's elder sister; Raunaq's wife (2023)
- Srishti Singh as Roshni Babbar (née Chopra): Sanjay and Saroj's younger daughter; Chandni's younger sister; Nirbhay's ex-girlfriend; Sumer's second wife; Raunaq and Avantika's stepmother (2023)
- Sai Ketan Rao as Raunaq Babbar: Sumer and Chitra's son; Roshni's stepson; Avantika's elder brother; Nisha's elder cousin; Chandni's Husband(2023)

=== Recurring ===
- Anju Rajeev as Vandana: Saroj's mother; Sanjay's mother-in-law; Chandni and Roshni's maternal grandmother (2023)
- Vandana Vithlani as Bindu Chopra: Sanjay's mother; Chandni and Roshni's paternal grandmother (2023)
- Aliraza Namdar as Sanjay Chopra: Bindu's son; Saroj's widower; Chandni and Roshni's father (2023)
- Jatin Singh Jamwal as Tarun Sachdev (2023)
- Hitanshu Jinsi as ACP Manav Dahiya: Natasha's husband; Diya's father; Nisha's love interest (2023)
- Sumeet Sachdev as Sumer Babbar: Sanjyot and Meher's brother; Chitra's widower; Roshni's husband; Raunaq and Avantika's father (2023)
- Unknown as Chitra Babbar (née Reddy) : Sumer's first wife; Raunaq and Avantika's mother (2023) (Dead)
- Unknown as Avantika Babbar: Sumer and Chitra's daughter; Roshni's step-daughter; Raunaq's younger sister; Nisha's cousin (2023) (Dead)
- Drashti Bhanushali as Nisha: Sanjyot's daughter; Raunaq and Avantika's cousin; Manav's love interest (2023)
- Anahita Jahanbakah as Sanjyot Babbar: Sumer and Meher's elder sister; Nisha's mother; Chitra's murderer (2023)
- Payas Pandit as Meher Babbar: Sanjyot and Sumer's sister; Gautam's wife (2023)
- Anuj Kohli as Gautam: Meher's husband (2023)
- Rutuja Sawant as Natasha Dahiya (née Mehra) : Manav's wife; Diya's mother (2023)
- Trishaan Maini as Jogi (2023)
- Yenen Verma
- Aryan Arora as Nirbhay Dhillon: Roshni's ex-boyfriend (2023) (Dead)

== Production ==
=== Casting ===
Srishti Singh was cast as Roshni Chopra. She made her television debut with Chashni. Talking about playing a mother-in-law, she said, "Aishwarya Rai's character Paro from 'Devdas' is my inspiration for my character Roshni who plays the role of a Saas. I aim to mould my character of the saas in the shape, etiquette, and mannerisms, of the way Aishwarya has depicted herself in the film. I admire the way Paro has become a household name and I hope I receive the same amount of appreciation and love from the audience for Roshni."

Sumeet Sachdev was cast as Sumer Babbar. He lost 15 kilograms to fit in the role. Sai Ketan Rao was cast as Raunaq Reddy, a guy who is half Punjabi and half Hyderabadi.

=== Promotion ===
The lead actresses, Amandeep Sidhu and Srishti Singh, travelled in Mumbai Locals as a part of publicity campaign for the show.

== See also ==
- List of programmes broadcast by StarPlus
