= Mehndi Hai Rachne Waali =

Indian television series

- Genre: Romance; Drama
- Created by: Sandiip Sikcand
- Written by: Sonali Gupta Shrivastav
- Screenplay by: Nidhi Singh
- Story by: Abhijeet Guru; Santshree Sarkar; Nishchal Shome; Sonakshi Khandelwal; Vikas Tejpal Sharma
- Directed by: Hemant R Prabhu; Jafar Shaikh; Rohit Phulari
- Creative directors: Sandiip Sikcand; Kadambari S Dogrey; Twinkle S Pandey
- Starring: Shivangi Khedkar; Sai Ketan Rao
- Theme music composer: Prakash Gaiakwad
- Opening theme: Mehndi Hai Rachne Waali by Anwesha
- Composer: Shubham Sundaram
- Country of origin: India
- Original language: Hindi
- No. of episodes: 246

Production
- Producers: Fazila Allana; Sandiip Sikcand; Kamna Menezes
- Production location: Kolhapur
- Cinematography: Sadanand Pillai
- Editors: Prerit Vyas; Swapnikal S Nerukar; Akshat Jaimini; Om Tale; Mohit Varshney
- Camera setup: Multi-camera
- Running time: 22 minutes
- Production companies: SOL Productions; Sandiip Films

Original release
- Network: StarPlus
- Release: 15 February – 27 November 2021

Mehndi Hai Rachne Waali is an Indian Hindi-language television drama series that premiered on 15 February 2021 on StarPlus. It is based on Star Maa's Telugu series Gorintaku. Produced by SOL Productions and Sandiip Films, it stars Shivangi Khedkar, and Sai Ketan Rao.

== Plot ==
The story centres around Pallavi Deshmukh, a widowed daughter-in-law of the Deshmukh family. Despite being loved as a daughter by most of the family members, she faces challenges, especially from Sulochana and Amruta. Pallavi manages the Deshmukh Saree Emporium for her father-in-law, Vijay Deshmukh. The plot takes a turn when Raghav Rao, a business tycoon with an arrogant and reckless demeanour, enters Pallavi's life, leading to misunderstandings based on their different personalities.

In later developments, it is disclosed that the accountant in Pallavi's shop is Keerti, who happens to be Raghav's sister. Keerti and her mother, Jaya, live separately from Raghav due to past incidents. Raghav, driven by misunderstandings, wrongly believes that his mother and sister were defamed because of Pallavi. Seeking revenge, he fabricates evidence to defame Pallavi, leading Vijay to disown Pallavi and expel her from the house.

Upon learning about Pallavi's situation, Jaya demanded that Raghav should marry Pallavi if he wanted them to reconcile. Raghav, seeking to live with Jaya and Keerti, proposed to Pallavi. Initially, Pallavi rejected the proposal without much consideration. However, Raghav blackmailed Pallavi by putting her brother-in-law Nikhil in jail. To save Nikhil, Pallavi reluctantly agrees to marry Raghav. After the marriage, Jaya and Keerti move to Raghav's house, and Pallavi becomes more assertive in dealing with the arrogant Raghav.

Later, Raghav realizes that Sulochana is the person who defamed Keerti and Jaya. After discovering the truth, a guilt-ridden Raghav stops Pallavi from leaving and asks for a chance to become a good husband within one month. Pallavi agrees to the condition. During this time, Pallavi and Raghav grow closer, and Raghav falls in love with Pallavi. Pallavi learns that Raghav's father was lynched resulting from a failed financial business of Raghav, which led to Keerti and Jaya distancing themselves from him.

Pallavi clears the misunderstandings between Raghav and Jaya. During this time, Keerti's lover, Sunny, arrives, and Sulochana plots against Raghav and Pallavi, inadvertently bringing them closer. The Rao family disapproves of Keerti and Sunny's relationship due to his bad behaviour. Pallavi investigates her ex-husband Mandar's accident and discovers that Sunny was responsible. She sends Sunny to jail, leading Keerti to consider Pallavi as her enemy.

It is then revealed that Mandar is still alive and Pallavi brought him to the Deshmukh family. Mandar creates many misunderstandings between Pallavi and Raghav to have Pallavi for himself. Meanwhile, Raghav and Pallavi confessed their love for each other. Raghav and Pallavi exposed Mandar in front of the family that he stalked Pallavi during her college days he killed Pallavi's best friend, Devyani, to get her and also tried to kill his own mother by pushing her from terrace for supporting Raghav and Pallavi.

Sunny and Keerti elope, causing Pallavi to be blamed initially, but the matter is later resolved. Keerti and Sunny move into Raghav's house, where Sunny causes trouble for the family. Meanwhile, Pallavi discovers Raghav's involvement in diamond smuggling during a police encounter and gets shot. The experience of almost losing Pallavi prompts Raghav to abandon smuggling.

Raghav's ex-girlfriend Esha came who just wanted the money of Raghav and made Pallavi believe that she and Raghav slept together. A heartbroken Pallavi breaks all ties with Raghav. Later Pallavi found that Esha was framing Raghav and she exposed her with the help of Raghav and Sunny.

The show ended with Pallavi and Raghav remarrying with the blessings and love of their respective families. Sulochana, Amruta and Manasi became good to others. Keerti and Sunny are accepted by the Rao family and Keerti becomes pregnant.

== Cast ==
=== Main ===
- Shivangi Khedkar as Pallavi Deshmukh Rao – Caretaker of Deshmukh Saree Emporium; Sister of Siddhesh, Nikhil, Amruta, and Mansi. Raghav's wife (2021)
- Sai Ketan Rao as Raghav Rao – Don of Hyderabad; Jewellery Designer and owner of Jayati Jewels; Jaya and Ajit's son; elder brother of Kirti and Arjun. Pallavi's husband (2021)

=== Recurring ===
- Milind Phatak / Sameer Deshpande as Vijay Deshmukh – Owner of Deshmukh Saree Emporium; Milind's brother; Sharda's husband; Pallavi and Nikhil's father (2021)
- Asmita Ajgaonkar as Sharda Deshmukh – Vijay's wife; Pallavi and Nikhil's mother (2021)
- Karan Manocha as Nikhil Deshmukh – Vijay and Sharda's younger son; Brother of Pallavi, Mansi and Amruta. (2021)
- Ajinkya Joshi as Milind Deshmukh – Vijay's brother; Sulochana's husband; Mansi and Amruta's father (2021)
- Snehal Reddy as Sulochana Deshmukh – Milind's wife; Mansi and Amruta's mother (2021)
- Rutuja Sawant as Mansi Deshmukh – Milind and Sulochana's elder daughter; Amruta's sister; Mandar and Nikhil's cousin; Rahul's ex-fiancée (2021)
- Priyanka Dhavale as Amruta Deshmukh – Milind and Sulochana's younger daughter; Sister of Pallavi, Nikhil, and Mansi. (2021)
- Snehal Borkar as Krishna – Pallavi's friend and assistant at Deshmukh Saree Emporium (2021)
- Ragini Shah / Geeta Tyagi as Jaya Rao – Ajit's wife; Raghav, Kirti and Arjun's mother (2021)
- Sayali Salunkhe as Kirti Rao Ahuja – Jaya and Ajit's daughter; Raghav and Arjun's sister; Sunny's wife (2021)
- Kushagre Dua as Sunny Ahuja: Kirti's husband (2021)
- Himanshu Bamzai as Farhad Nawaz: Raghav's secretary, right-hand man and friend (2021)
- Krishna Kaurav as Harish: Raghav's bodyguard (2021)
- Jeet Pol as Madan: Raghav's bodyguard (2021) Aaj
- Jatin Sharma as Sumit: Esha's estranged husband (2021)
- Sarika Raghwa as Anjali: She tried to get intimate with Raghav despite being engaged to someone else. Later Raghav exposed her in front of her fiancé (2021)
- Saim Khan as Akash: Kirti's love interest (2021)
- Gourav Raj Puri as Rahul: Mansi's ex-fiancé; Asha's son (2021)
- Sonal Palan as Asha: Rahul's mother (2021)
- Manoj Kaushik as Siddhesh Sawant: Pallavi's brother; Pawani's husband (2021)
- Payal Singh as Pawani Sawant: Siddhesh's wife (2021)
- Ankit Gulati as Vedant (Ved) aka Lion: Raghav's former best friend and business partner who turned enemy due to business differences (2021)
- Snehal Waghmare as ACP Laxmi Singh: Raghav's enemy (2021)
- Abhay Verma as Rocky: Sunny's friend (2021)
- Ishrat Khan as Dr. Ramya: Mandar/Raja's doctor turn into Amma (2021)
- Supreet Nikam as Vishnu: Mandar/Raja's friend (2021)
- Deepak Soni as Inspector Nitin Reddy (2021)

== Awards ==
Year	Organizer	Category	Nominated	Result	Ref.
2022	21st Indian Television Academy Awards	Popular Show	Mehndi Hai Rachne Waali: Drama	Nominated	
2022	21st Indian Television Academy Awards	Popular Actor: Drama	Sai Ketan Rao	Nominated	
2022	21st Indian Television Academy Awards	Popular Actress: Drama	Shivangi Khedkar	Nominated	
2022	Iconic Gold Awards	Best Debut TV Actress	Shivangi Khedkar	Won	
2022	Iconic Gold Awards	Best Debut TV Actor	Sai Ketan Rao	Won	
2022	14th Gold Awards	Best Onscreen Jodi	Sai Ketan Rao & Shivangi Khedkar	Nominated	
2022	14th Gold Awards	Debut in a Lead Role (Male)	Sai Ketan Rao	Nominated	
2022	14th Gold Awards	Debut in a Lead Role (Female)	Shivangi Khedkar	Nominated	
2022	22nd Indian Television Academy Awards	Popular Show: Drama TV	Mehndi Hai Rachne Waali	Nominated	
2022	22nd Indian Television Academy Awards	Popular Actor: Drama TV	Sai Ketan Rao	Nominated	
2022	22nd Indian Television Academy Awards	Popular Actress: Drama TV	Shivangi Khedkar	Nominated	

== Production ==
=== Preparation ===
Shivangi Khedkar said, "My character is of a Maharashtrian girl, Pallavi. Since our whole team is Marathi, everyone helps me in speaking words in their language. Even I am working hard myself".

=== Filming ===
Set against the backdrop of Hyderabad, the series was mainly filmed at sets in Kolhapur in Maharashtra while some initial sequences were shot in Hyderabad in early February 2021.

On 13 April 2021, Chief Minister of Maharashtra, Uddhav Thackeray announced a sudden curfew due to increased COVID-19 cases, and the show's production halted on 14 April 2021. The show's team decided to temporarily move their shooting location to Ramoji Film City in Hyderabad until the next update.

=== Release ===
It premiered on 15 February 2021 at 6:30 PM on StarPlus. However, on 11 October 2021, it was shifted to the early-evening slot of 5:30 PM to accommodate upcoming show, Vidrohi.
