= This Weekend =

- Poster of the Tamil version of Kaattu Puli
- Directed by: Tinu Verma
- Starring: Arjun Sarja; Rajneesh Duggal; Sayali Bhagat; Bianca Desai; Amit Dawer; Annanya Brahma; Jahan; Jennifer; Taniya Mirza
- Music by: Vijay Verma
- Production company: Kapishek Films Pvt Ltd
- Release date: 17 February 2012
- Country: India
- Language: Hindi

This Weekend is a 2012 Indian Hindi-language thriller film directed by Tinu Verma and starring Arjun Sarja, Rajneesh Duggal, Sayali Bhagat, Bianca Desai, Amit Dawer, Annanya Brahma, Jahan, Jennifer and Taniya Mirza. The climax of the film was also partially reshot in Tamil (under the title Kaattu Puli; transl. Forest tiger) and Telugu. The film was released on 17 February 2012.

== Plot ==
Dr. Sanjay, his wife Dr. Shivani and their daughter Anjali go on a picnic and become stranded deep in a forest. They are joined by three young couples who are also lost in the jungle. While searching for a way out, the group experiences a series of mysterious events and its members grow close to one another. They discover that a gang of cannibals is working with doctors to kill people and illegally harvest their organs. When the gang hunts them, Sanjay fights back to protect the others.

== Cast ==
- Arjun Sarja as Dr. Sanjay
- Rajneesh Duggal as Ajay
- Sayali Bhagat as Divya
- Bianca Desai as Dr. Shivani
- Raj Preemi as Naga
- Tinu Verma as Rudra
- Amit Dawer as Raj
- Annanya Brahma as Sonal
- Tina as Dr. Sujata
- Sikha Aarya as Chanddi
- Jahan as Gaurav
- Jennifer as Shruti
- Taniya Mirza as Anjali

== Production ==
Stunt director Tinu Verma first met Arjun Sarja on the sets of Champion (2000). This film marks the Bollywood debut of Bianca Desai. The film was shot in Talakona. The film was awarded an 'A' certificate.

== Soundtrack ==
Amitabh Bachchan attended the film's audio launch since Tinu Verma had worked as an action director for several of Amitabh Bachchan's films.

== Reception ==
Reviewing the Tamil version, Kaattu Puli, a critic from SuperGoodMovies.com gave the film a rating of two out of five and opined that the film "was okay for Arjun fans". Rohit Ramachandran of Nowrunning gave it half a star out of five and called the film "an act of raping cinema".

== Box office ==
The film released to no expectations and was a box office failure.
