= Sudesh Berry =

Indian actor, director, producer, singer

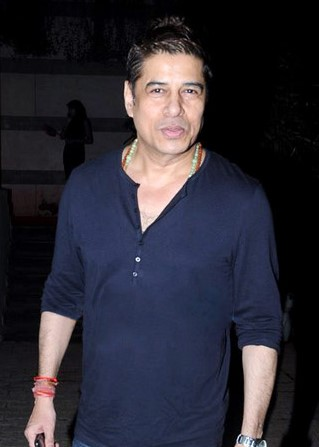
- Born: Bombay, Maharashtra, India
- Education: Mithibai College
- Occupations: Actor, director, producer
- Years active: 1988–present
- Notable work: Mahabharat; Border; Suraag – The Clue; LOC: Kargil; Agle Janam Mohe Bitiya Hi Kijo; Devon Ke Dev...Mahadev; Mahabharat; Shakti – Astitva Ke Ehsaas Ki
- Spouse: Sarita Berry
- Children: Suraj Berry

Sudesh Berry is an Indian actor and personality known for his works in Hindi cinema and Indian television.

== Early life and background ==
Sudesh Berry was born in Mumbai, Maharashtra, India. He belongs to a Punjabi family from Amritsar.

== Career ==
Berry began his acting career with the film Khatron Ke Khiladi (1988). He gained recognition with supporting roles in films such as Ghayal (1990), where he played Rajan Berry. Throughout the 1990s and 2000s, he appeared in several Hindi films including Vansh (1992), Veergati (1995), Army (1996), and war film Border (1997), in which he portrayed Subedar Mathura Das. He then worked in films such as Refugee (2000), LOC: Kargil (2003), Tango Charlie (2005), 99 (2009) and Sanam Teri Kasam (2016).

In addition to Hindi cinema, Berry has also appeared in regional films including Punjabi, Tamil, and Malayalam productions.

Berry made his television debut in the late 1980s with the epic series Mahabharat, in which he played Maharaj Vichitravirya.

== Filmography ==
Year	Title	Role	Notes
1988	Khatron Ke Khiladi		Uncredited
1990	Ghayal	Rajan Berry	
1992	Yudhpath	Karan	
1992	Vansh	Gautam	
1993	Pehla Nasha	Himself	Guest appearance
1993	Kayda Kanoon	Kishan	
1994	Fauj	Vijay	
1995	Veergati	Inspector Neelkanth	
1995	Policewala Gunda	ACP Ajit Singh's brother	
1995	Mohini		
1996	Himmat	Abdul	Special appearance
1996	Shohrat	Vikrant	
1996	Army	Khan	
1997	Border	Subedar Mathura Das	
2000	Woh Bewafa Thi		
2000	Refugee	Gul Hamid	
2001	Khatron Ke Khiladi		
2001	Avgat		
2002	Maa Tujhhe Salaam	Gul Mastan	
2002	Inth Ka Jawab Patthar	Inspector Vijay Saxena	
2002	Aakhri Inteqam	Devendra Prasad Srivastav (Deva)	
2003	LOC: Kargil	COL. Lalit Rai (CO, 1/11 Gurkha Rifles)	
2003	Aaj Ka Andha Kanoon	Inspector Yash	
2003	Border Hindustaan Ka	Jaffar/Jaanisar	
2004	Wajahh: A Reason to Kill	Sameer	
2005	Tango Charlie	BSF soldier Bhiku	
2007	Kaafila	Santokh Singh	
2008	Wafa: A Deadly Love Story	Inspector Harry	
2009	99	Sunil Mehta	
2010	Admissions Open	Doctor	
2012	Second Show	Vishnu Budhan	Malayalam film
2013	Mumbai Mirror		Special appearance
2013	Boss	Dushayat	Special appearance
2013	Ainthu Ainthu Ainthu	Chitranjan	Tamil film
2016	Sanam Teri Kasam	Rajinder Lal Parihaar	
2017	Sardar Saab		Punjabi film
2022	Rajnandini		
2026	Border 2	Subedar Mathura Das	Cameo appearance
2026	Krishnavataram Part 1: The Heart (Hridayam)	Rishi	Cameo appearance

=== Television ===
Year	Serial	Role	Notes
1988–1989	Mahabharat	Maharaj Vichitravirya	
1992	Kashish	Rahul Anand	
1994–2000	Andaz	Yashvardhan "Yash" Thakur	
1995	Mohini	Dev Arunachalam	
1999–2002	Suraag – The Clue	Inspector Bharat Chatterjee	
1999	Jaan	Kishan Sagar	
1999	Ma Shakti	Bhuvneshwara	
1999	Yug	Veerendra "Veeru" Singh	
2002–2004	Zindagi Teri Meri Kahani	Rahul Jaghandre	
2003–2004	CID Officer	Inspector Vidhan	
2005	Kamini Damini	Saurabh Verma	
2007–2008	Amber Dhara	Advocate Dev Shukla	
2008–2011	Mata Ki Chowki	Sheel Kumar	
2009–2011	Agle Janam Mohe Bitiya Hi Kijo	Loha Singh	
2011	Dil Se Diya Vachan	Advocate Gajendra Upadhyay	
2013	Arjun	S. Yadav	
2013	Devon Ke Dev...Mahadev	Malla/Mani	
2013–2014	Mahabharat	Maharaj Drupada	
2014-2015	Bandhan - Saari Umar Humein Sang Rehna Hai	Vishwasrao Tagdu Patil	
2015	Maha Kumbh: Ek Rahasaya, Ek Kahani	Ashwatthama	
2015–2016	Begusarai	Manohar Thakur	
2015–2016	Siya Ke Ram	Parashuram	
2016–2021	Shakti – Astitva Ke Ehsaas Ki	Harak Singh	
2017	Prem Ya Paheli – Chandrakanta	Marich	
2017	Koi Laut Ke Aaya Hai	Bhavani Singh Rathore	
2018–2020	Muskaan	Teerath Singh	
2020	Maddam Sir	Angad Acharya	
2022	Choti Sarrdaarni	Guruji / Akhand Swaminathan	
2022	Rang Jaun Tere Rang Mein	Kashinath Pandey	
2022	Gud Se Meetha Ishq	Satyakam Rawat	
2023–2024	Purnimaa	Garjan Singh	
2024	Vanshaj	Amarjeet Talwar	
2025	Ram Bhavan	Subhash Mishra	
2025	Sajan Ji Ghar Aaye Family Kyun Sharmaye	Nirmal Sinha	
2026–present	Suraag 2.0	Inspector Bharat	
