= Aaj Ka Andha Kanoon =

- Directed by: Amit Chandra Sahay
- Written by: K.K. Dharni, Sanjay Sinha
- Produced by: Amit Chandra Sahay
- Starring: Sudesh Berry
- Cinematography: Salim Khan, Dinesh Thakkar
- Edited by: Mahesh Kumbhar
- Music by: Jay
- Distributed by: First Movie International
- Release date: 10 June 2003
- Country: India
- Language: Hindi

Aaj Ka Andha Kanoon (English: Today's Blind Law) is a 2003 Indian Bollywood adult drama film directed and produced by Amit Chandra Sahay.

== Cast ==
- Sudesh Berry as Insp. Yash
- Priyanka Trivedi
- Mahavir Shah as Shiva
- Vishakha Jhaveri as Jyoti
- Prithvi as Inspector Shakti
- Bharat Kapoor
- Ramesh Goyal
- Brij Gopal
- Roy Mathew
- Pawan Kumar
- Bengladeshi Sersabadi
