= Ribbhu Mehra =

Indian television actor, model and DJ

- Born: 17 November; Delhi, India
- Occupations: Actor, DJ, model
- Years active: 2015–present
- Known for: Nikhil on Yeh Hai Mohabbatein; Ritik on Kumkum Bhagya

Ribbhu Mehra, (born 17 November) is an Indian television actor, DJ and model. He is known for his appearances on two television series that is as Nikhil on Yeh Hai Mohabbatein, and as Arjun Rathod on My Name Ijj Lakhan.

== Early life & education ==
He was born to Rakesh and Meenu Mehra, has an older sister, Ruchi Sharma, who is married. In his early life, Mehra studied at Vishwa Bharati Public School. He later studied accounting at the Institute of Chartered Accountants of India and graduated from Shaheed Bhagat Singh College completing his B.com (Hons).

== Career ==
In 2009, he started his career as a DJ. Later in 2015, he had a very short role in Ki and Ka opposite Kareena Kapoor. In the same year, he appeared in a Bangur Cements commercial and made his on-screen television debut in the show Rakkt as Akbar which aired on the television channel Epic TV. He starred in two other commercials for Flamingo Tvc and Jio Platforms's online e-commerce portal Fynd. His advertisement, Kahan se liya, for Fynd also was listed under Top 10 YouTube Ads in India (January 2017). In the same year, he appeared in an episode of the television series 24's second season, playing an ATU agent. In early 2017, he starred on Savdhaan India as Arjan. A month later in July, he debuted as Nikhil on the Star Plus soap opera Yeh Hai Mohabbatein. He has promoted Farah Khan's 'Lip Sing Battle' with his Ye Hai Mohabbatein co-star Aditi Bhatia. He has appeared in a television commercial opposite actress Malaika Arora. He has also DJed at a Goa resort for New Year's Eve. In 2018, he appeared in the music video, Re Piya, of singer Altaf Sayeed. In August, he appeared in another episode of Zing Channel's Aye Zindagi as a lead. In 2019, he was seen in the show on SAB TV's sitcom My Name Ijj Lakhan, as Arjun Rathod. In the same year, he booked his second show with Balaji Telefilms' Kumkum Bhagya as Ritik, Disha's love interest, and the web series XXX, season 2 with ALTBalaji. In 2020, he starred in the film Faactory. In 2022, he joined the cast of Star Bharat's Bohot Pyaar Karte Hai television series.

== Personal life ==
He was previously married, and later their marriage ended in a divorce.

== Filmography ==
=== Television and films ===
Year	Title	Character	Notes
2015	Rakkt	Akbar	Recurring role
2017	Savdhaan India	Arjan	Episodic role
2017	Aye Zindagi	Mahendra	Episodic role
2017-2018	Ye Hai Mohabbatein	Nikhil	Recurring role
2018	Aye Zindagi	Adhiraj	Episodic role
2019	My Name Ijj Lakhan	Arjun Rathod	Parallel lead role
2019-2020	Kumkum Bhagya	Ritik	Recurring role
2020	Faactory	Rahul	Film
2022	Bohot Pyaar Karte Hai	Mahesh	Recurring role
2022	Ghum Hai Kisikey Pyaar Meiin	D.M. Harish Vyas	Recurring role
2023	Bindiya Sarkar	Rohan Bhalla	Recurring role
2023	Swaraj	Bhupendra Dutta	Episodic
2025	Bade Achhe Lagte Hain 4	Nikhil	Recurring role
2025–2026	Naagin 7	Karan Suri	Recurring role

=== web series ===
Year	Title	Character	Channel	Notes
2017	Raah De Maa		Natak Entertainment	Cameo
2019	XXX (season 2)		ALTBalaji	Episodic role
2023	Manghadant	Inspector Parth	Watcho	

=== Music videos ===
Year	Title	Artist	Channel
2018	Re Piya	Altaf Sayeed	Zee Music Company
