= Vansh =

- Poster
- Directed by: Pappu Verma
- Story by: Mani Ratnam
- Based on: Agni Natchathiram (Tamil)
- Produced by: Pappu Verma
- Starring: Sudesh Berry; Siddharth Ray; Anupam Kher; Amrish Puri
- Cinematography: Sukumar Jatania
- Music by: Anand–Milind
- Release date: 24 January 1992
- Running time: 135 minutes
- Country: India
- Language: Hindi

Vansh (transl. Lineage) is a 1992 Indian Hindi language action drama film directed and produced by Pappu Verma. It is a remake of Mani Ratnam's 1988 Tamil film Agni Natchathiram. The film was well received at the box office.

== Plot ==
Justice Krishnakant Dharmadhikari is assigned to chair an inquiry commission against Mantri Vilasrao Chaudhary. While gathering evidence against the later, he must also deal with family problems, arising out of his bigamous relationship with Tulsi and Rukmani: Tulsi's children, Geeta and Siddharth; Rukmani's son, Inspector Gautam; the hostility displayed by his aging mother against Tulsi and her children; as well as the growing anger and animosity between Gautam and Siddharth, who have only one thing in common, namely the hatred for their father.

== Cast ==
- Sudesh Berry as Inspector Gautam Dharmadhikari
- Siddharth Ray as Siddharth Dharmadhikari
- Priyanka Puthran as Inspector Gautam Dharmadhikari's GirlFriend
- Ekta Sohini as Ekta Chaudhary
- Anupam Kher as Krishnakant Dharmadhikari
- Amrish Puri as Vilasrao Chaudhary
- Saeed Jaffrey as Police Commissioner
- Kader Khan as Havaldar Imaandar
- Asrani as Havaldar Wafadaar
- Yunus Parvez as Inspector Sher Bahadur
- Beena Banerjee as Tulsi Dharmadhikari
- Reema Lagoo as Rukmini Dharmadhikari
- Sushma Seth as Mrs. Dharmadhikari
- Achyut Potdar as Chaudhary Commission Report Head
- Anjan Srivastav as Vilasrao's CA
- Deepak Shirke as Vilasrao's goon

== Songs ==
The lyrics of all songs were written by Sameer, and the music was composed by Anand-Milind.

Song	Singer
"Aaye Hain Jalane"	S. P. Balasubrahmanyam
"Hum Hain Raja"	S. P. Balasubrahmanyam
"Aake Teri Bahon Mein Har Sham"	Lata Mangeshkar, S. P. Balasubrahmanyam
"Yeh Bindiya"	Lata Mangeshkar
"Main To Deewani Huyi"	Lata Mangeshkar, Suresh Wadkar
"Aa Bhi Ja"	Asha Bhosle
"Yaar Mere"	Kavita Krishnamurthy
