= Himmat (1996 film) =

- Theatrical release poster
- Directed by: Sunil Sharma
- Screenplay by: Sunil Sharma
- Dialogues by: Dilip Shukla
- Story by: Charandas Shokh
- Produced by: Sangeeta Singh
- Starring: Sunny Deol; Tabu; Naseeruddin Shah; Shilpa Shetty (extended special appearance); Sudesh Berry (extended special appearance); Mukesh Khanna; Mohan Joshi; Gulshan Grover; Kiran Kumar
- Cinematography: Sunil Sharma
- Edited by: Keshav Hirani
- Music by: Anand–Milind
- Production company: A. K. Productions
- Distributed by: Eros International
- Release date: 5 January 1996
- Country: India
- Language: Hindi
- Budget: ₹ 4.75 crore
- Box office: ₹ 8.22 crore

Himmat (transl. Dare) is a 1996 Hindi-language action spy film directed by Sunil Sharma, starring Sunny Deol, Tabu and Naseeruddin Shah, along with Shilpa Shetty (extended special appearance), Sudesh Berry (extended special appearance), Mukesh Khanna, Mohan Joshi, Gulshan Grover and Kiran Kumar. The film was released on 5 January 1996.

== Plot ==
The story begins two Indian Secret Service agents, Ajay Saxena and his close friend and colleague, Abdul Hussain. They share a brotherly bond and are dedicated to their work. Their chief assigns Abdul a critical mission: to take charge of "Project M," a top-secret project involving India's newly developed missile technology. Meanwhile, Ajay goes on a vacation to Switzerland.

In Switzerland, Ajay meets a beautiful woman named Anju, and the two fall in love. Their romance is a brief respite from the dangerous world Ajay inhabits. However, his vacation is cut short when he receives a tragic call.

Upon his return to India, Ajay is devastated to learn that Abdul has been killed, and the highly confidential Project M file has been stolen. The chief assigns Ajay the daunting task of not only recovering the file but also finding and apprehending the culprits responsible for Abdul's death.

Ajay's investigation leads him to Bangalore, where he is surprised to find that Anju also lives there. She is the daughter of a wealthy businessman named Brij Mohan, also known as BM. As Ajay's investigation deepens, he begins to uncover a dark and complex conspiracy.

Ajay's romance with Anju is put to the test as he realizes that her father, Brij Mohan, may be connected to the masterminds behind the theft of the secret file. The villains, led by a formidable figure named Luka, are now determined to eliminate Ajay just as they did Abdul.

The film introduces another key character, Nisha Bachani, a young and daring woman who initially appears to be a separate element. However, she is revealed to be a secret agent working for the villains, tasked with keeping an eye on Ajay and his movements. Her entry creates a love triangle of sorts, adding to the tension as she constantly tries to hinder Ajay's progress.

As the story reaches its climax, Ajay finds himself navigating through a series of dangerous encounters and action sequences. Nisha has a change of heart after realizing the full extent of the villains' "sins." She switches sides and helps Ajay, but her redemption is short-lived as she is killed.

With the loss of both Abdul, Ajay is fueled by a burning desire for vengeance. He faces Luka and his gang in a final confrontation.

== Cast ==
- Sunny Deol as Ajay Saxena
- Tabu as Anju – Ajay's girlfriend
- Naseeruddin Shah as Luka
- Shilpa Shetty (extended special appearance) as Nisha Bachani – Luka's henchwoman
- Sudesh Berry (extended special appearance) as Abdul Hussain – Ajay's friend
- Mukesh Khanna as Inspector D'Souza
- Mohan Joshi as Brij Mohan (BM) – Anju's father
- Gulshan Grover as Ranjit – Luka's brother
- Kiran Kumar as Kundan
- Navin Nischol as Chief of Secret Service
- Faqir Nabi as D.K. – Luka's associate
- Tinu Verma as Tyson – Luka's henchman
- Suresh Chatwal as Blind lottery seller
- Douglas Killen as Scientist
- Anand (Uday Narayan Singh) as Agent Anand
- Herman Dsouza as bodyguard of Luka
- Master Badal as Boy who taking out the air from the car
- Lynda Deol (Uncredited cameo) as Girl in club

== Music and soundtrack ==
The music of the film was composed by Anand–Milind and the lyrics of the songs were penned by Sameer.

The soundtrack was released in 1994 on Audio Cassettes, on Tips Music, which consists of 7 songs. The full album was recorded by Kumar Sanu, Udit Narayan, Alka Yagnik, Poornima, Bali Brahmbhatt, Abhijeet and Suresh Wadkar.

Himmat

Soundtrack album by Anand - Milind
- Released: 1995
- Genre: Feature film soundtrack
- Length: 42:01
- Language: Hindi
- Label: Tips Music
- Producer: Sangeeta Singh

=== Track list ===
#	Title	Singer(s)
1	"Mujhe Tujhse Kuchh Kehna Hai"	Kumar Sanu, Alka Yagnik
2	"Saathiya Bin Tere Dil Mane Naa"	Kumar Sanu, Alka Yagnik
3	"Behke Behke Kadam Hai"	Poornima
4	"Mathe Ki Bindia"	Udit Narayan, Alka Yagnik
5	"Teri Khamoshi Ka Matlaab" (Not in the film)	Abhijeet, Suresh Wadkar
6	"Kuku Kuru Sun Zara"	Kumar Sanu, Poornima
7	"Habibi Twist Karenge Twist"	Udit Narayan, Bali Brahmbhatt
