= Ganga Ka Vachan =

Ganga Ki Vachan is a Hindi action film of Bollywood directed by Gulshan Ashte and produced by Manisha Vimal. This movie was released on 12 June 1992 under the banner of Vardan Films.

== Plot ==
Ganga, an ill-fated girl joined a dacoit gang after refusal of her husband. She falls in love with Vikram, leader of the gang and marries him. Another dacoit leader Thakur Dayalu Singh kills Vikram. Ganga oaths to avenge the murder of Vikram.

== Cast ==
- Upasana Singh as Ganga
- Siddharth Ray as Vikram
- Shakti Kapoor as Khan
- Kader Khan as Shastri
- Gulshan Grover as Birju
- Avtar Gill as Avtar Singh
- Mangal Dhillon as Thakur Dayalu Singh
- Mahavir Shah as Bheema

== Soundtrack ==
Alka Yagnik and Udit Narayan were the main singers of this film. Music is composed by Nikhil-Vinay

Songs

1. Chham Chham - Alka Yagnik
2. Dharti Tujh Par Naaz Kare - Udit Narayan
3. Dhum Dhum - Udit Narayan
4. Dilbar Janiya - Udit Narayan
5. Meri Neend Kahin - Udit Narayan, Alka Yagnik
6. Satrangi Chudiyan - Alka Yagnik
