= Sandiip Sikcand =

Indian filmmaker

- Citizenship: Indian
- Occupations: Actor, producer and creative director
- Years active: 2006 to present
- Television: Kasamh Se (2006); Yeh Hai Mohabbatein (2017)

Sandiip Sikcand is an Indian actor, producer and creative director. His prominent works include Kasamh Se (2006) Yeh Hai Mohabbatein (2017), Mehndi Hai Rachne Waali (2021) and Bohot Pyaar Karte Hai (2022).

== Career ==
Sandiip started his career in the entertainment industry as a creative director with TV series Kasamh Se in 2006. He was also a part of the cast in Phulwa as a writer from 2011 to 2012. He was the creative director for Bandini (2009–11) and Yeh Hai Mohabbatein (2017–2019).

In 2020, he produced television series Kahaan Hum Kahaan Tum. In 2021, he created and produced Mehndi Hai Rachne Waali. In the following year, Sandiip produced Bohot Pyaar Karte Hai. In 2023, he produced Star Plus show Chashni.
