= Yudhpath =

1992 Hindi film

Yudhpath युद्धपथ
- Directed by: Ravi Ravan Kathuria
- Screenplay by: Ravi Ravan Kathuria, Baba Khan
- Produced by: Javed Riaz
- Starring: Sudesh Berry; Siddharth Ray
- Music by: Dilip Sen-Sameer Sen
- Release date: 1992
- Country: India
- Language: Hindi

Yudhpath (transl. War route) is a 1992 Bollywood action film directed by Ravi Ravan Kathuria and starring Sudesh Berry, Mohnish Bahl, Kiran Kumar, Rakesh Bedi, Tinnu Anand and Siddharth Ray. The movie was released on 27 March 1992. The film is an action movie.

== Cast ==
- Sudesh Berry as Karan Choudhary
- Mohnish Bahl as Shankar J Tripathi
- Kiran Kumar as Gorakh Kapoor, Sarita,s husband
- Rakesh Bedi as David
- Tinnu Anand as Iqbal Diwana
- Siddharth Ray as Vicky Kapoor [ Vikram]

== Soundtrack ==
#	Title	Singer(s)
1	"Jab Aaye Aise Pal Kabhi"	Anwar
2	"Jab Aaye Aise Pal Kabhi" (version 2)	Anwar
3	"Chhora Badnaam"	Jolly Mukherjee, Shailender Singh, Jolly Mukherjee, S. Kumar
4	"Iss Pe Joban Ki"	Sadhana Sargam, Ila Arun
5	"I Love You"	Kumar Sanu, Kavita Krishnamurthy
6	"I Love You"	Kumar Sanu, Kavita Krishnamurthy
7	"Wah Wah Kya Baat Hai Teri	Sarika Kapoor, Simmi Sinha
