= Siddharth Ray =

Indian actor (1963–2004)

- Siddharth in the film Baazigar (1993)
- Born: Sushant Ray; 19 July 1963; Bombay, Maharashtra, India
- Died: 8 March 2004 (aged 40); Mumbai, Maharashtra, India
- Occupation: Actor
- Years active: 1970–2004
- Spouse: Shantipriya (m. 1992–2004)
- Children: 2

Siddharth Ray (born Sushant Ray; 19 July 1963—8 March 2004) was an actor in Hindi and Marathi films. He was the grandson of filmmaker V. Shantaram and maternal cousin of Durga Jasraj.

== Early life ==
Siddharth Ray was born into a film family. He was the grandson of V. Shantaram. His mother, Charusheela Ray, was the daughter of V. Shantaram by his first wife Vimla Shantaram. His father was Dr. Subrato Ray, a Bengali economist. He was of Marathi descent on through his mother and of Bengali descent through his father.

His father was also an accomplished sitar player. His parents had met in one of the recording sessions. Sushanta was born into privilege from both sides. They lived in a comfortable house in Dadar, Mumbai. His father was the Chief Economic Advisor of Bombay Port Trust.

== Personal life ==
In 1992, Siddharth Ray married Indian actress, Shantipriya, younger sister of actress Bhanupriya. Ray died of a heart attack in 2004, at the age of only 40. He is survived by his wife their two sons.

== Career ==
Ray acted in the film Chaani as a child artist. That movie was directed by his grandfather V. Shantaram. He also played young Nagya in the Marathi film 'Jait Re Jait'. As an adult, his debut film was Thodisi Bewafaii in 1980, where he appeared opposite Padmini Kolhapure. He received praise for his performance in Vansh (1992), the remake of Mani Ratnam's Agni Natchathiram. Other noteworthy Hindi film roles include Parwane (1993), Baazigar (1993), Pehchaan (1993), Ganga Ka Vachan, Tilak and Military Raaj.

He was known as Sushant Ray in the Marathi film industry and acted in commercially successful movies such as Ashi Hi Banwa Banwi (alongside Laxmikant Berde, Ashok Saraf and Sachin) and Balache Baap Brahmachari (alongside Alka Kubal Laxmikant Berde and Ashok Saraf).

His last film was Charas: A Joint Operation, released in 2004—the year of his death.

== Filmography ==
- 2004 Charas: A Joint Operation
- 2002 Jaani Dushman: Ek Anokhi Kahani as Madan
- 2002 Pitaah as Bachchoo Singh
- 2000 Bichchoo
- 1993 Baazigar as Inspector Karan
- 1993 Parwane as Henry D'Souza
- 1993 Khoon Ka Sindoor
- 1993 Aandha Intaquam as Ravi
- 1993 Pehchaan as Robert
- 1992 Yudhpath as Vicky Kapoor (Vikram)
- 1992 Vansh as Siddharth Dharmadhikari
- 1992 Ganga Ka Vachan as Vikram
- 1992 Tilak as Vijay
- 1992 Panaah as Jeeva
- 1989 Balache Baap Brahmachari - Dinesh Patil
- 1988 Ashi Hi Banwa Banwi - Shantanu Mane
- 1987 7 Saal Baad as Vijay
- 1987 Jhanjhaar as Shantesh
- 1982 Matli King
- 1980 Thodisi Bewafaii as Abhinandan Choudhary aka Nandu
- 1977 Chaani as child artist
- 1977 Jait Re Jait as child artist
- 1971 Jal Bin Machhli Nritya Bin Bijli as Bandit child
- 1975 Raja Rani Ko Chahiye Pasina
