= Tinu Verma =

Indian director, actor and stunt director

- Occupations: Director; Action Director; Actor; Story Writer; Producer
- Spouse: Veena Verma
- Relatives: Jeetu Verma (stepbrother); Shyam Goel (brother-in-law)

Tinu Verma is an Indian actor, story writer and producer and action director known for his works in Hindi cinema.

== Personal life ==
Tinu Verma comes from a family deeply involved in the Hindi film industry, with his father Badriprasad Jaidev Verma supplying horses and working as a stunt double in the 1960s and 70s. B.P. Verma also produced the film Naam O Nishan (1987). His brothers Mahendra Verma and Pappu Verma are stunt directors and actors, and his step-brothers Bhiku Verma, Jeetu Verma, and Manohar Verma have also worked as actors, stunt directors, or action coordinators. His brother-in-law is writer Shyam Goel. He belongs to a Rajput family of the Jadaun clan with roots in Rajasthan.

In 2013, Verma attacked his stepbrother Manohar Verma with a sword and was arrested by police.

== Filmography ==
Stunt director

- Shola Aur Shabnam (1992)
- Khuda Gawah (1992)
- Aankhen (1993)
- Himmat (1996)
- Loafer (1996)
- Jeet (1996)
- Raja Hindustani (1996)
- Border (1997)
- Gadar: Ek Prem Katha (2001)
- Jaani Dushman: Ek Anokhi Kahani (2002)
- Soutan (2009; Bhojpuri)
- Puli (2010; Telugu)

Actor

- Aankhen (1993)
- Himmat (1996)
- Ghatak: Lethal (1996)
- Mela (2000)
- Maa Tujhe Salaam (2002)
- Soutan (2009)
- This Weekend (2012)
- Dulhan Chahi Pakistan Se (2016; Bhojpuri)
- Karmaphal Data Shani (2016)
- Laila Majnu (2020; Bhojpuri)
- Kisi Ka Bhai Kisi Ki Jaan (2023)

Director

- Maa Tujhe Salaam (2002)
- Baaz: A Bird in Danger (2003)
- Raja Thakur (2006)
- This Weekend (2012)
- Ghulami (2015)
- Karmaanya (TBA)
