= My Name Ijj Lakhan =

Indian television series

- Created by: Paritosh Painter
- Directed by: Nitin Chaudhary; Jackson Sethi; Dharampal Thakur
- Starring: See below
- Composer: Souvik Chatterjee
- Country of origin: India
- Original language: Hindi
- No. of seasons: 1
- No. of episodes: 26

Production
- Producer: Paritosh Painter
- Camera setup: Multi camera
- Running time: 45 minutes
- Production company: Ideas Entertainment

Original release
- Network: Sony SAB
- Release: 26 January – 21 April 2019

My Name Ijj Lakhannn (transl. My name is Lakhan) is an Indian Hindi language sitcom TV show that premiered on 26 January 2019 at SAB TV. It starred Shreyas Talpade, Esha Kansara, Parmeet Sethi, Archana Puran Singh and Ribbhu Mehra.

== Plot ==
Lakhan is a small goon who does bad deeds, but his good nature brings him on the right path. He loves his parents, and decides to make money by doing work, as his father wanted(whom he thinks is dead). He is envied by his master, Lucky, who wants Lakhan to be ousted, and is jealous of him. As Lakhan keeps on running in comical and tough situations, he figures ways to get out of them and strives to become a good person.

== Cast ==
- Shreyas Talpade as Lakhan
- Esha Kansara as Radha
- Parmeet Sethi as Dashrath
- Archana Puran Singh as Paramjeet
- Sanjay Narvekar as Lucky Bhai
- Nasirr Khan as Aftab Chunni
- Ribbhu Mehra as Arjun Rathod
- Deeksha Kanwal Sonalkar as Sweety
- Jayesh Thakkar as Jignesh
- Pawan Singh as Ghanti
