= Sai Ketan Rao =

Indian actor (born 1994)

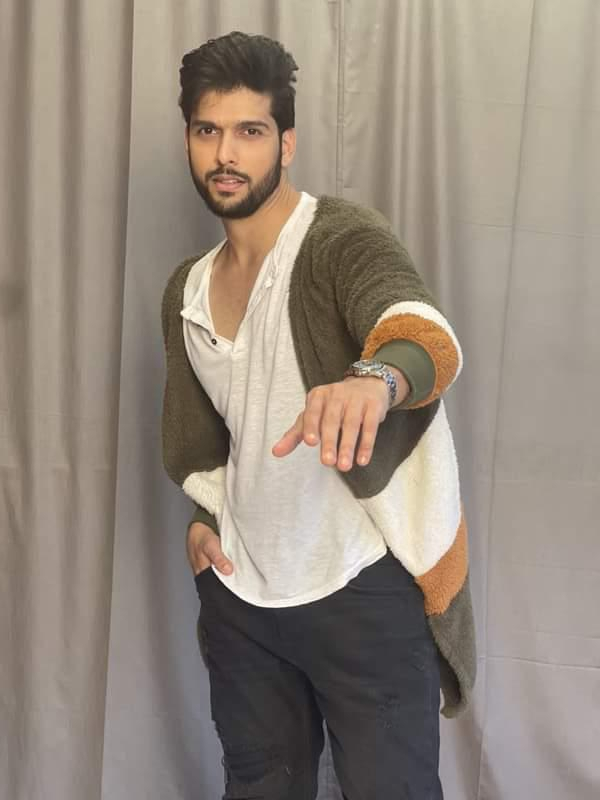
- Born: 10 July 1994 (age 32); Lonavala, Maharashtra, India
- Occupation: Actor
- Years active: 2016–present
- Known for: Mehndi Hai Rachne Waali

Sai Ketan Rao (born 10 July 1994) is an Indian actor. He is best known for StarPlus's Mehndi Hai Rachne Waali and Imlie.

== Early life ==
Sai Ketan Rao was born into a middle-class family in Lonavala, Maharashtra. His father is an architect from Maharashtra, while his mother is a nutritionist from Hyderabad.

He started his schooling in Solapur, Maharashtra but soon shifted to Pune, Maharashtra and finally settled down in Hyderabad, Telangana. He completed his tenth grade in Hyderabad from Vignan School and pursued B. Tech in Computer Science from Hyderabad Institute of Technology and Management. After completing his graduation, he completed his MBA in System Operations from Gandhi Institute of Technology and Management, Hyderabad Campus.

Ketan was a state-level boxer until suffering an injury due to bike accident.

== Personal life ==
In June 2024, he talked about his troubled childhood while the live streaming of Bigg Boss OTT 3. He revealed that his father abandoned the family and his mother raised him and his younger sister as a single parent.

== Career ==
Rao worked for an Australian company after completing his education, but he had a strong inclination towards acting since childhood, and joined Ramanaidu Film School. He started his acting career after completing theatre arts and worked on short films and feature films. He has a film production company by the name Aurum Motion Pictures.

He rose to fame from his portrayal of Raghav Rao in Mehndi Hai Rachne Waali. He was then seen in Star Plus's Chashni as Raunaq Babbar (Reddy). He played the double lead role of Agasthya Singh Chaudhary / Surya Pratap Reddy in Star Plus' Imlie.

Ketan's television debut was with Agni Sakshi. He also worked in Hindi web series and a few Telugu web series. His web series include Three Half Bottles (2019) on ZEE5, Love Studio (2020) on YouTube, Lovely (2021) on ShreyasET, and Aham Bhramhasmi (2021) on MX Player and Hungama Digital. He acted in Tollywood films such as Ajay Passayyadu (2019) and Strangers (2021) on Amazon Prime, and Mounam (2020) on Aha.

Rao participated as a contestant on the reality TV show, Bigg Boss OTT Season 3. He entered the show on June 21, 2024 and became one of the top four finalists. The series is streamed on JioCinema Premium. Since September 2026, he portrayed Inspector Shaurya Shastri in DD National's Suraag 2.0.

== Filmography ==
=== Television ===
Year	Title	Role	Language	Channel	Ref.
2017	Agni Sakshi	Pratap	Telugu	Star Maa	
2021	Mehndi Hai Rachne Waali	Raghav Rao / RR	Hindi	StarPlus	
2023	Chashni	Raunaq Babbar (Reddy)	Hindi	StarPlus	
2023–2024	Imlie 3	Agasthya Singh Chaudhary	Hindi	StarPlus	
2023–2024	Imlie 3	Surya Pratap Reddy	Hindi	StarPlus	
2024	Bigg Boss OTT 3	Contestant (4th Place)	Hindi	JioCinema	
2026- present	Suraag 2.0	Inspector Shaurya Shastri	Hindi	DD National	

=== Web series ===
Year	Title	Role	Language	Platform	Notes	Reference
2019	Three Half Bottles	Aditya	Hindi	Zee5	Lead	
2019	Beyond Breakup		Telugu	MX Player	Guest	
2020	Love Studio	Nishant	Telugu	YouTube	Lead	
2021	Lovely	Rohit	Telugu	YouTube	Lead	
2021	Aham Bhramhasmi	Darsh	Telugu	Amazon Prime, MX Player	Lead	
2021	The Baker and The Beauty	Rohan Kapoor	Telugu	Aha	Cameo	

=== Short films ===
Year	Title	Role	Language	Notes	Reference
2016	Devil In Disguise	Aryan Mishra	Telugu	Cameo	
2017	Phasgaya Banda	Antony	Hindi	Supporting	
2018	Panileni Gang		Telugu	Lead	
2018	Malli Kothaga		Telugu	Lead	
2018	Vadha		Telugu	Lead	
2019	My Dear Ravana	Lakshman	Telugu	Villain	
2020	Mounam		Telugu	Guest	
2020	Chuppi		Hindi, Telugu		
2022	aAh!	Amar	Hindi	Cameo	
2022	Final Act		Telugu	Lead	
2024	Mumbai guy vs UP girl	Chinmay Rane	Hindi	Lead	
2025	Pereira House	Inspector Danish Khan	Hindi	Lead	
2025	Bestfriend Too Hot To Handle		Hindi	Lead	
2025	Karn Pishachini		Hindi	Lead	

=== Films ===
Year	Title	Role	Language	Reference
2017	Nene Raju Nene Mantri	Pellikoduku	Telugu	
2018	Ajay Passayyadu	Vikram	Telugu	
2019	Vykuntapali	Abhi	Telugu	
2021	Strangers	Varun	Telugu	
2021	Most Eligible Bachelor	Harsha's Friend	Telugu	
2022	Pellikuturu Party	Geeky Udey	Telugu	
2022	Vala	Kabir	Telugu	

=== Music videos ===
Year	Title	Production	Singer	Writer	Starring	Ref.
2022	Mashhoor Banegi	AUM Studios	Prateek Gandhi	Ritika Chawla	Shivangi Khedkar	
2022	Ishq Ho Jayega	Aurum Motion Pictures	Prateek Gandhi	Ragini Mahajan	Shivangi Khedkar	
2023	Phir Kabhi	Minara Music	Amit Mishra	Shabbir Ahmed & Lovely Singh	Sanaya Pithawala	
2024	Jee Nahi Paunga	Red Ribbon Musik	Shariq Shez	Rehana Faaiz	Urmita Ghosh	
2025	Haste Haste	SVMT Music & Desi Tadka Music	Amarinder		Eugeniya Belousova	
2025	Pyaar Ho Gaya	Red Ribbon Musik	Jonita Gandhi & Aankit Kholia	Aankit Kholia	Riya Vedi	
2025	Dil Mera Lauta Do	Let's Get LOUDER by IN10 Media Network	Afsana Khan	Sanjeev Chaturvedi	Isha Agarwal	
2025	Fasana	Zee Music Company	Rohit Dubey	Bhringu Parashar	Samira Kazi	

=== Special appearances ===
Year(s)	Title	Role	Language	Channel	Refs
2024	Ghum Hai Kisikey Pyaar Meiin	Surya Pratap Reddy	Hindi	StarPlus	
2024	Udne Ki Aasha	Surya Pratap Reddy	Hindi	StarPlus	

== Accolades ==
Year	Organizer	Category	Show	Result	Ref.
2021	IWMBuzz Style Awards	Emerging Fashion Icon (Male)	Mehndi Hai Rachne Waali	Won	
2022	21st Indian Television Academy Awards	Best Actor (Popular)	Mehndi Hai Rachne Waali	Nominated Top 20	
2022	Iconic Gold Awards	Best Debut TV Actor of the Year (Male)	Mehndi Hai Rachne Waali	Won	
2022	14th Gold Awards	Best Onscreen Jodi (with Shivangi Khedkar)	Mehndi Hai Rachne Waali	Nominated	
2022	14th Gold Awards	Debut in a Lead Role (Male)	Mehndi Hai Rachne Waali	Nominated	
2022	22nd Indian Television Academy Awards	Popular Actor: Drama TV	Mehndi Hai Rachne Waali	Nominated	
2022	Bollywood Life Awards 2022	Best Breakthrough Star	Mehndi Hai Rachne Waali	Won	
2022	Bollywood Life Awards 2022	Best Social Media TV Couple (with Shivangi Khedkar)	Mehndi Hai Rachne Waali	Nominated	
2023	23rd Indian Television Academy Awards	Best Actor	Mehndi Hai Rachne Waali	Nominated	
2023	23rd Indian Television Academy Awards	Best Actor	Chashni	Nominated	
2023	Grand Tycoon Global Achievers Awards (Film Fare Middle East)	Emerging Talent of the Year		Won	
2023	Mestarlet Excellence Awards 2023	Rising Actor of the Year - Male	Imlie	Won	
2024	24th Indian Television Academy Awards	Best Actor (Popular)	Imlie	Nominated	
