= Maa Tujhhe Salaam (2002 film) =

2002 Indian film by Tinu Verma

- Theatrical release poster
- Directed by: Tinu Verma
- Screenplay by: Shyam Goel
- Dialogues by: K. K. Singh
- Story by: Tinu Verma
- Produced by: Mahendra Dhariwal
- Starring: Sunny Deol; Tabu; Arbaaz Khan
- Narrated by: Om Puri
- Cinematography: Raju Kaygee
- Edited by: Sanjay Sankla
- Music by: Songs: Sajid–Wajid; Score: Monty
- Production company: Indian Movies
- Release date: 25 January 2002
- Running time: 139 minutes
- Country: India
- Language: Hindi
- Budget: ₹13 crore
- Box office: ₹22.84 crore

Maa Tujhhe Salaam (transl. Salute to you, mother) Is a 2002 Indian Hindi-language action film directed by Tinu Verma. The film stars Sunny Deol, Tabu and Arbaaz Khan. It was released on 25 January 2002. Box Office India called the film an above average grosser at the box office.

== Plot ==
An Indian military officer, Major Pratap Singh, aborts a terrorist infiltration attempt of an enemy country single-handedly with the help of a few local civilians in an area that's located near the border of India.

Lala is a prominent landlord in Zhonabad, but behind the curtain, he is a Pakistani agent who helps infiltration of terrorists and ammunition through the passes in mountains known to him and his men only. In the winter season, the weather conditions become unfit for inhabitants of the area, who are forced to shift to other places from there. Lala takes advantage of this situation and carries out his activities, assisted by his unwitting henchman Albaksh.

Captain Sonia, a military intelligence officer, discovers Lala and Albaksh's anti-national activities and informs the military. The military authorities order Major Pratap to go to Zhonabad to keep an eye on Lala and Albaksh. In the meantime, Albaksh learns of Lala's activities. He opposes Lala but invites his wrath in turn. Lala frames and portrays Albaksh as a traitor and terrorist. The police arrest Albaksh.

Subsequently, Major Pratap meets Albaksh, who reveals Lala's activities and also how he is all set to help the infiltrators into the country through Zhonabad. Since there isn't much time for the Indian military force to reach Zhonabad, Major Pratap decides to fight the battle alone with the help of Albaksh and the locals.

In the final scene, Major Pratap, arming himself with an arsenal of firearms, attacks a large terrorist force of Gul Mastan and Lala and, with the help of Albaksh and some Indian soldiers, manages to wipe out the entire force. Major Pratap incapacitates Gul, while Albaksh thrusts a knife through Lala, ending the terrorist threat. Major Pratap, despite being mortally wounded, manages to survive thanks to the prayers and well wishes of the Indian army, which belongs to various faiths and religions.

== Cast ==
- Sunny Deol as Major Pratap Singh
- Tabu as Captain Sonia Khanna
- Arbaaz Khan as Albaksh
- Monal as Nargis
- Tinu Verma as the Lala Sultan
- Mohan Joshi as Col Khanna
- Sudesh Berry as Gul Mastan
- Sharat Saxena as Capt Diler Singh
- Vivek Shauq as Capt. Purushottam
- Deep Dhillon as Bakhtawar Sultan
- Brij Gopal as Terrorist
- Ali Khan as Imran Sultan
- Rana Jung Bahadur as Inspector Ali Khan
- Jeetu Verma as Sajid Sultan
- Prithvi as Satya
- Anang Desai as Shiva
- Avtar Gill as Maulvi
- Inder Kumar as Capt. Irshaad Khan
- Nawab Shah as Nawab Sultan
- Rajat Bedi as Capt. Arshad Khan (guest appearance)
- Malaika Arora as an item number "Sone Ke Jaisi Hai Meri Jawaani"
- Vikranta Sandhu as Khan
- Sheela Sharma as Shiva's wife

== Music and soundtrack ==
The music for the songs was composed by Sajid–Wajid and the songs were penned by Sameer, Tejpal Kaur and Vikki Nagar. The background score of the movie was provided by Monty.

No.	Title	Singer(s)	Length
1.	"Maa Tujhhe Salaam"	Shankar Mahadevan
2.	"Chham Chham Bole Payal Piya""	Kavita Krishnamurthy, Udit Narayan
3.	"Dekhne Ko Tujhko"	Sonu Nigam, Bhairvi, Chorus
4.	"Sone Ke Jaisi Hai Meri Jawaani"	Asha Bhosle
5.	"Oye Ranjhana"	Sunidhi Chauhan
6.	"Chhodh Ke Na Jaa Ooh Piya"	Alka Yagnik

== Reception ==
Radhika Rajamani of The Hindu wrote, "The film salutes the motherland and its soldiers but at the cost of a slow-paced, non-gripping and expected narrative which does not infuse much enthusiasm or interest". Sukanya Verma of Rediff.com said, "Call it a sham, an action-packed masala potboiler, a revenge drama, a love story. Contrary to its title, Maa Tujhe Salaam is anything but a patriotic film". Sify said, "There are many aspects that should make it a success, especially the INDO-PAK theme and the hard-hitting dialogues that are sure to be remembered for years".
