= List of Hindi songs recorded by Kumar Sanu =

Kumar Sanu is an Indian playback singer, working primarily in Hindi films, he also sings in many other Indian languages, including English, Marathi, Assamese, Bhojpuri, Gujarati, Telugu, Malayalam, Kannada, Tamil, Punjabi, Oriya, Chhattisgarhi, Urdu, Pali, and his native language, Bengali. He has sung a many songs in Hindi films. The following is a complete list of his Hindi film songs every year in alphabetical order:

== 1980s ==
=== 1983 ===
Film(s)	No.	Song name(s)	Co-Singer(s)	Music director(s)	Lyricist(s)
Baap Bete	1	Yeh Pyar Ka Mausam	Vani Jairam	Ilaiyaraaja	3

=== 1984 ===
Film(s)	No.	Song name(s)	Co-Singer(s)	Music director(s)	Lyricist(s)
Yeh Desh	2	Dekhna Dekhna	Shailendra Singh, Shakti Thakur, Udit Narayan	R.D. Burman	Anand Bakshi

=== 1989 ===
Film(s)	No.	Song name(s)	Co-Singer(s)	Music director(s)	Lyricist(s)
Abhi To Main Jawan Hoon	3	"Eena Meena Deekha"	Solo	Anand–Milind	Sameer
Ajnabi Saaya	4	"Jungle Mein Mangal"	Solo	Ghulam Ali	Mrs.Rajni G Bhatia
Asmaan Se Ooncha	5	"Jiya Pyar Mange Jiya"	Sadhna Sargam	Rajesh Roshan	Indeevar
Asmaan Se Ooncha	6	"Zindagi Se Jab Mile"	Sadhna Sargam, Abhijeet Bhattacharya, Anwar, Sarika Kapoor	Rajesh Roshan	Indeevar
Billoo Badshah	7	"Pyar Karenge Abhi Karenge"	Kavita Krishnamurthy	Jagjit Singh	Nida Fazil
Billoo Badshah	8	"Ladka Razi Ladki Razi"		Jagjit Singh	Nida Fazil
Ghabrahat	9	"Chori Chori Khel Gori"	Hemlata, Sushil Kumar	Ravindra Jain	Ravindra Jain
Hero Hiralal	10	"Jashna Hai Mohabbat Ka"	Solo	Hridhyanath Mangeshkar	Gulzar
Jaadugar	11	"Aaye Hain Duaen Dene"	Jolly Mukherjee, Sapna Mukherjee, Sadhana Sargam	Kalyanji Anandji	Anjaan
Jaadugar	12	"Main Jaadugar"	Jolly Mukherjee	Kalyanji Anandji	Anjaan, Prakash Mehra
Jaadugar	13	"Naach Meri Radha"	Alka Yagnik	Kalyanji Anandji	Prakash Mehra
Jaisi Karni Waisi Bharni	14	"Aaja Aa Khelein Game Koi"	Sadhana Sargam	Rajesh Roshan	Indeewar
Kala Bazaar	15	"Keh Do Ye Haseeno Se"	Sadhana Sargam, Asha Bhosle, Anwar	Rajesh Roshan	Payam Sayeedi, Indeevar
Kala Bazaar	16	"Ek Tujh Mein Hi"	Sarika Kapoor	Rajesh Roshan	
Kanoon Ki Awaaz	17	"Saajan Mere Saajan"	Chitra Singh	Jagjit Singh	Indeevar
Maar Dhaad	18	"Pagal Mann Mera"	Sadhana Sargam, Chandru Atma	Rajesh Roshan	Anjaan
Mohabat Ka Paigham	19	"Mehfil Ho Dil Walon Ki"	Sudesh Bhosle, Johny Whisky	Bappi Lahiri	Anjaan
Sindoor Ki Awaaz	20	"Ghar Ghar Ki Ramayan"	Sadhana Sargam	Rajesh Roshan	Indeevar
Vardi	21	"Teri Hiffazat Meri Hiffazat"	Solo	Anu Malik	Anand Bakshi
Vardi	22	"Teri Hifazat Meri Hifazat (Sad)	Solo	Anu Malik	Anand Bakshi

== 1990s ==
=== 1990 ===
Film(s)	No.	Song name(s)	Co-Singer(s)	Music director(s)	Lyricist(s)
Aaj Ke Shahenshah	23	"Mohabbat Kitne Rang Badalti Hai",	Solo	Bappi Lahiri	Anjaan
Aaj Ke Shahenshah	24	"Mohabbat Kitne Rang (Sad)"	Solo	Bappi Lahiri	Anjaan
Aandhiyan	25	"Phir Dil Ne Woh Chot Khayi"	Solo	Bappi Lahiri	Anjaan
Aashiqui	26	"Ab Tere Bin Jeelenge Hum"	Solo	Nadeem-Shravan	Sameer
Aashiqui	27	"Nazar Ke Saamne Jigar"	Anuradha Paudwal	Nadeem-Shravan	Sameer
Aashiqui	28	"Dheere Dheere Se"	Anuradha Paudwal	Nadeem-Shravan	Rani Malik
Aashiqui	29	"Jane Jigar Janeman"	Anuradha Paudwal	Nadeem-Shravan	Sameer
Aashiqui	30	"Ek Sanam Chahiye"	Solo	Nadeem-Shravan	Sameer
Aashiqui	31	"Tu Meri Zindagi Hai"	Anuradha Paudwal	Nadeem-Shravan	Sameer
Aashiqui	32	"Main Duniya Bhula Dunga"	Anuradha Paudwal	Nadeem-Shravan	Sameer
Aashiqui	33	"Dil Ka Aalam"	Solo	Nadeem-Shravan	Madan Pal
Aashiqui	34	"Jane Jigar Janeman - 2"	Anuradha Paudwal	Nadeem-Shravan	Sameer
Agneekaal	35	"Zameen Aur Aasman"	Solo	Pankaj Bhatt	Shyam Raj
Apmaan Ki Aag	36	"Dekh Phuljadi"	Solo	Nadeem-Shravan	
Awaragardi	37	"Rahegi Rahegi Ye Dosti"	Solo, Udit Narayan	Bappi Lahiri	Anjaan
Awaragardi	38	"Rahegi Rahegi (Sad)"		Bappi Lahiri	Anjaan
Bahaar Aane Tak	39	"Yeh Khamoshi Mere Hum Nashi"	Anuradha Paudwal	Rajesh Roshan	Ibrahim Ashq
Bunglow No.666	40	"Aayi Amavas Ki Raat"	Solo, Kavita Krishnamurthy	Anu Malik	Sameer
Bunglow No.666	41	"Aayi Amavas Ki Raat (Part 2)"		Anu Malik	Sameer
C.I.D.	42	"Teri Na Na Na"	Alka Yagnik	Kalyanji Anandji	Anjaan
Din Dahade	43	"Kaam Jahan Mein"	Solo	Jeetu-Tapan	Naqsh Lyallpuri
Din Dahade	44	"Ganapati"	Suresh Wadkar	Jeetu-Tapan	Naqsh Lyallpuri
Din Dahade	45	"Ladi Ladi Jabse Nazar"	Asha Bhosle	Jeetu-Tapan	Naqsh Lyallpuri
Ghayal	46	"Sochna Kya"	Shabbir Kumar, Asha Bhosle	Bappi Lahri	Indeewar
Ghayal	47	"Sochna Kya (Sad)"	Solo	Bappi Lahri	Indeewar
Gunahon Ka Devta	48	"Ae Sanam Ae Sanam"	Alka Yagnik	Anu Malik	Indeevar
Hamari Shadi	49	"Aisa Bhi Hota Hai"	Solo	Salil Chowdhury, Sanjoy Chowdhury	Yogesh
Hamari Shadi	50	"Nagar Hai Ye To"	Solo		Yogesh
Jurm	51	"Jab Koi Baat Bigad Jaaye"	Sadhana Sargam	Rajesh Roshan	Indeewar
Kasam Jhoot Ki	52	"Main Awara Shehzada"	Solo	Jeetu-Tapan	
Kasam Jhoot Ki	53	"Apni Apni Kismat"	Solo	Jeetu-Tapan	
Lootera Sultan	54	"Godi Ma Humko Uthaile"	Kavita Krishnamurthy	Bajju	Bajju

=== 1991 ===
Film(s)	No.	Song name(s)	Co-Singer(s)	Music director(s)	Lyricist(s)
Baharon Ke Manzil	112	"Sabse Badi Dosti Yaar"	Poornima, Udit Narayan, Suresh Wadkar	Raamlaxman	Dev Kohli
Baharon Ke Manzil	113	"Tak Dhin Tak Dhin"	Suresh Wadkar, Udit Narayan	Raamlaxman	Dev Kohli
Begunaah	123	"Mohniye Soniye Ha Dil Liya"	Sadhana Sargam	Rajesh Roshan	Nida Fazli
Bhabhi	114	"Naach Nachaye Rupaiya"	Solo	Anu Malik	Dev Kohli
Dharam Sankat	102	"Enam Maro Deti Ja"	Sonali Vajpayee	Kalyanji Anandji	Vishweshwar Sharma
Dil Hai Ke Manta Nahin	70	"Dil Hai Ke Manta Nahin"	Anuradha Paudwal	Nadeem-Shravan	Faaiz Anwar
Dil Hai Ke Manta Nahin	71	"Adayain Bhi Hai"	Anuradha Paudwal	Nadeem-Shravan	Sameer
Dil Hai Ke Manta Nahin	72	"Tu Pyar Hai Kisi Aur Ka"	Anuradha Paudwal	Nadeem-Shravan	Sameer
Dil Hai Ke Manta Nahin	73	"Kaise Mizaj Aap Ke Hain"	Anuradha Paudwal	Nadeem-Shravan	Faaiz Anwar
Ghar Parivar	95	"Road Romeo"	Satyanarayan Rao	Kalyanji Anandji	Anjaan
Ghar Parivar	96	"Beech Bajariya Ladi Najariya"	Solo	Kalyanji Anandji	Anjaan
Hafta Bandh	124	"Aye Haseena Tera"	Solo	Bappi Lahiri	Javed Akhtar
Hafta Bandh	125	"Dekho Jidhar Bhi"	Solo	Bappi Lahiri	Javed Akhtar
Jaan Ki Kasam	85	"Barsaat Ho Rahi"	Anuradha Paudwal	Nadeem-Shravan	Sameer
Jaan Ki Kasam	86	"Jo Hum Na Milenge"	Anuradha Paudwal	Nadeem-Shravan	Sameer
Jaan Ki Kasam	87	"So Ja Chup Ho Ja"	Anuradha Paudwal	Nadeem-Shravan	Sameer
Jeena Teri Gali Mein	93	"Tere Hum Ae Sanam"	Anuradha Paudwal	Babul Bose	Ravinder Rawal
Jeena Teri Gali Mein	94	"Aaj Is Rut Mein"	Anuradha Paudwal	Babul Bose	Ravinder Rawal
Jhoothi Shaan	111	"Rani Ki Nikli Sawaari"	Solo	RD Burman	Javed Akhtar
Jungle Beauty	101	"Saath Tumhara Jaan Se Pyara"	Sadhana Sargam	Bappi Lahiri	Shaily Shailendra
Kaun Kare Kurbanie	110	"Tu Meri Laila"	Sadhana Sargam	Kalyanji Anandji	Anjaan
Maa	78	"Aaine Ke Sau Tukde"	Solo	Anu Malik	Hasrat Jaipuri, Dev Kohli
Maa	79	"Chanda Ne De Chandni"	Kavita Krishnamurthy	Anu Malik	
Meena Bazar	100	"Kuch Bhi Nahi Hai Zindagi"	Solo	Naresh Sharma	
Mehandi Ban Gai Khoon	105	"Meri Hasraton Ka Janaaza Utha Ke"	Alka Yagnik, Suresh Wadkar	Usha Khanna	Kaushal, Balbir Kalyan
Mehandi Ban Gai Khoon	106	"Phoolon Ka Sabko Hota Nahin Naseeb"		Usha Khanna	
Naag Mani	107	"Zindagi Mein Jeete Jeete Marna"	Anuradha Paudwal	Anu Malik	
Nachnewala Gaanewale	127	"Shagunon Ka Mela"	Vijay Benedict	Bappi Lahiri	
Nachnewala Gaanewale	128	"Badhaai"		Bappi Lahiri	
Nachnewala Gaanewale	129	"Aayee Hai Naseebon Wali"		Bappi Lahiri	
Naya Zaher	99	"One One De De Chance"	Solo	Kalyanji–Anandji	Indeevar
Pehli Mohabbat	100	"Meri Saans Saans"	Kavita Krishnamurthy	Kanak Raj	Ravinder Rawal
Pehli Mohabbat	101	"Dil Bhool Nahi Sakta"	Kavita Krishnamurthy	Kanak Raj	Faiz Anwar
Pehli Mohabbat	102	"Janewale Sang Tere"	Alka Yagnik	Kanak Raj	Ravinder Rawal
Pehli Mohabbat	103	"Meri Pehli Mohabbat Ho Tum"	Solo	Kanak Raj	Faiz Anwar
Phool Aur Kaante	57	"Jise Dekh Mera Dil Dhadka"	Solo	Nadeem-Shravan	Sameer
Phool Aur Kaante	58	"Premi Aashiq Aawaara"	Solo	Nadeem-Shravan	Sameer
Phool Aur Kaante	59	"Dheere Dheere Pyar Ko"	Alka Yagnik	Nadeem-Shravan	Sameer
Phool Aur Kaante	60	"Tumse Milne Ko Dil Karta Hai"	Alka Yagnik	Nadeem-Shravan	Sameer
Phool Aur Kaante	61	"Dheere Dheere Hausla (Sad)"	Alka Yagnik	Nadeem-Shravan	Sameer
Phool Aur Kaante	62	"Maine Pyar Tumhi Se Kiya Hai"	Anuradha Paudwal	Nadeem-Shravan	Sameer
Phool Aur Kaante	63	"Pehli Baarish Main Aur Tu"	Anuradha Paudwal	Nadeem-Shravan	Sameer
Pratigyabadh	103	"Are Hey Ri Chhori Malan Ki"	Solo	Kalyanji-Anandji	Hasan Kamal
Pratigyabadh	104	"Rama Ho Rama Tere Ishq"	Alka Yagnik	Kalyanji-Anandji	Hasan Kamal
Pyaar Bhara Dil	115	"Chand Ban Ke Tum Gagan Se"	Anuradha Paudwal	Nikhil–Vinay	
Pyaar Ka Saaya	88	"Teri Dosti Se Mila Hai"	Asha Bhosle	Nadeem-Shravan	Sameer
Pyaar Ka Saaya	89	"Har Ghadi Mere Pyar Ka Saaya"	Asha Bhosle	Nadeem-Shravan	Sameer
Pyaar Ka Saaya	90	"Tumse Thoda Sa Door"	Asha Bhosle	Nadeem-Shravan	Sameer
Pyaar Ka Saaya	91	"Aaja Aaja Aa Bhi Ja"	Alisha Chinai	Nadeem-Shravan	Sameer
Pyaar Ka Saaya	92	"Har Ghadi Mere Pyar Ka Saaya (Male)"	Solo	Nadeem-Shravan	Sameer
Ramgarh Ke Sholay	116	"Dosti Dosti Teri Meri"	Mohammed Aziz	Anu Malik	Dev Kohli & Dilip Tahir
Ramgarh Ke Sholay	117	"Hum Nahin To Tum Nahin"	Alka Yagnik	Anu Malik	
Ramgarh Ke Sholay	118	"Rapat Rola Mat Karo"	Kavita Krishnamurthy	Anu Malik	
Ramgarh Ke Sholay	119	"Teri Zulfein Shaam Si Roshan"	Kavita Krishnamurthy	Anu Malik	
Ramgarh Ke Sholay	120	"Dosti Dosti Teri Meri (Sad)"	Solo	Anu Malik	
Saajan	55	"Mera Dil Bhi Kitna Pagal Hai"	Alka Yagnik	Nadeem-Shravan	Sameer
Saajan	56	"Jiye To Jiye Kaise"	Anuradha Paudwal, S. P. Balasubrahmanyam	Nadeem-Shravan	Sameer
Saathi	74	"Zindagi Ki Talaash Mein"	Solo	Nadeem-Shravan	Sameer
Saathi	75	"Yaarana Yaar Ka"	Vipin Sachdeva	Nadeem-Shravan	Sameer
Saathi	76	"Mohabbat Ko Duniya"	Debashish Dasgupta	Nadeem-Shravan	Sameer
Saathi	77	"Aisa Bhi Dekho"	Anwar	Nadeem-Shravan	Sameer
Sadak	64	"Tumhein Apna Banane Ki Kasam"	Anuradha Paudwal	Nadeem-Shravan	Sameer
Sadak	65	"Mohabbat Ki Hai Tumhare Liye"	Anuradha Paudwal	Nadeem-Shravan	Sameer
Sadak	66	"Jab Jab Pyar Pe Pehra"	Anuradha Paudwal	Nadeem-Shravan	Sameer
Sadak	67	"Rehne Ko Ghar Nahi"	Debashish Dasgupta, Junaid Akhtar	Nadeem-Shravan	Sameer
Sadak	68	"Tak Dhin Dhin Tak"	Babla Mehta, Anuradha Paudwal	Nadeem-Shravan	Sameer
Sadak	69	"Tumhein Apna Banane Ki Kasam (Male)"	Solo	Nadeem-Shravan	Sameer
Sau Crore	126	"Hai Deshi Dhun Videshi Taal"	Kavita Krishnamurthy	Bappi Lahiri	Suraj Jagan
Shiv Ram	121	"Aah Ye Haseen Raat"	Anuradha Paudwal	Rajesh Roshan	Anwar Sagar
Swarg Jaisaa Ghar	108	"Dil Bechoge"	Sadhana Sargam	Bappi Lahiri	Majrooh Sultanpuri
Swarg Jaisaa Ghar	109	"Diwana Hoon Mein"	Alka Yagnik	Bappi Lahiri	Majrooh Sultanpuri
Thalapathi	122	"Naach Lachak Ke Naach"	Sadhana Sargam	Ilaiyaraaja	Ilaiyaraaja
Trinetra	80	"Aaya Main Yahan Tere Liye"	Solo	Anand–Milind	Sameer
Trinetra	81	"Maine Tujhe Chhod Ke–1"	Solo	Anand–Milind	Sameer
Trinetra	82	"Maine Tujhe Chhod Ke–2"	Solo	Anand–Milind	Sameer
Trinetra	83	"Maine Tujhe Chhod Ke–3"	Solo	Anand–Milind	Sameer
Trinetra	84	"Maine Tujhe Chhod Ke–4"	Solo	Anand–Milind	Sameer
Yodha	97	"Whole Day Whole Night Dil Tarse"	Alka Yagnik	Bappi Lahiri	Anand Bakshi
Yodha	98	"Duniya Me Jina Hai To Sikh Lo Tum Marna"	Amit Kumar, Anupama Deshpande	Bappi Lahiri	Anand Bakshi

=== 1992 ===
Film(s)	No.	Song name(s)	Co-singer(s)	Music director(s)	Lyricist(s)
Aaj Ka Goonda Raaj	152	"Lashkara Lashkara Teri Bindiya Ka"	Alka Yagnik	Anand–Milind	Sameer
Aaj Ki Taaqat	257	"Title Song"	Shabbir Kumar	Bappi Lahiri	Indeevar
Ajeeb Dastan Hai Yeh	258	"Tune Waqt Hey Raqeeb Mere	Solo	Shyam–Surender	
Ajeeb Dastan Hai Yeh	259	"Tera Pyar Hai Kya"	Alka Yagnik	Shyam–Surender	
Anaam	208	"Aaye Barati"	Solo	Nadeem-Shravan	Sameer
Anaam	209	"Mein Kaun Mein Kya"	Solo	Nadeem-Shravan	Sameer
Anaam	210	"Churi Boli Paayal Bole"	Alka Yagnik	Nadeem-Shravan	Sameer
Anaam	211	"Hum Nasheen Dilrubaa"	Sadhana Sargam	Nadeem-Shravan	Sameer
Balwaan	184	"Kya Cheez Ye Mohabbat Hai"	Kavita Krishnamurthy	Kishore-Mahesh	Dev Kohli
Bandhu	229	"Chalo Chalein Sathiya"	Asha Bhosle	Ranjit Gazmir	Kiran Mishra
Bekhudi	185	"Aa Khel Khelen Hum"	Asha Bhosle	Nadeem-Shravan	Anwar Sagar, Sikandar Bharati, Surendra Saathi
Bekhudi	186	"Khat Maine Tera Naam Likha"	Asha Bhosle	Nadeem-Shravan	
Bekhudi	187	"Dekh Ke Yeh Roomal"	Asha Bhosle	Nadeem-Shravan	
Bekhudi	188	"Daddy Mummy Meri Shaadi"	Asha Bhosle	Nadeem-Shravan	
Bekhudi	189	"Mujhe Kya Pata Tera Ghar"	Asha Bhosle	Nadeem-Shravan	
Bol Radha Bol	137	"Main Hoon Gaon Ki Gori"	Poornima	Anand–Milind	Sameer
Bol Radha Bol	138	"Tu Tu Tu Tu Tu Tara"	Poornima	Anand–Milind	Sameer
Chamatkar	176	"Is Pyar Se Meri Taraf Na Dekho"	Alka Yagnik	Anu Malik	Anand Bakshi
Chamatkar	177	"O Meri Neendein Churane Wale"	Asha Bhosle	Anu Malik	Anand Bakshi
Chamatkar	178	"Yeh Hai Pyaar Pyaar"	Asha Bhosle	Anu Malik	Anand Bakshi
Chamatkar	179	"Dekho Dekho Chamatkar"	Sukhwinder Singh, Nandu Bhende	Anu Malik	Anand Bakshi
Chamatkar	180	"Is Pyar Se Meri Taraf (Male)"	Solo	Anu Malik	Anand Bakshi
Deewana	130	"Sochenge Tumhe Pyaar"	Solo	Nadeem-Shravan	Sameer
Deewana	131	"Teri Umeed Tera Intezar"	Sadhana Sargam	Nadeem-Shravan	Sameer
Deewana	132	"Payaliya"	Alka Yagnik	Nadeem-Shravan	Sameer
Deewana	133	"Teri Isi Ada Pe Sanam"	Sadhana Sargam	Nadeem-Shravan	Sameer
Deewana	134	"Tere Dard Se Dil"	Solo	Nadeem-Shravan	Sameer
Deewana	135	"Teri Umeed Tera Intezar–2"	Sadhana Sargam	Nadeem-Shravan	Sameer
Dil Ka Kya Kasoor	157	"Mera Sanam Sabse Pyara Hai"	Asha Bhosle	Nadeem-Shravan	Sameer, Madan Pal
Dil Ka Kya Kasoor	158	"Milne Ki Tum Koshish Karna"	Asha Bhosle	Nadeem-Shravan	
Dil Ka Kya Kasoor	159	"Dil Jigar Nazar Kya Hai"	Solo	Nadeem-Shravan	
Dil Ka Kya Kasoor	160	"Khata To Jab Ho"	Alka Yagnik	Nadeem-Shravan	
Dil Ka Kya Kasoor	161	"Ga Raha Hoon Is Mehfil Mein"	Solo	Nadeem-Shravan	
Dil Ka Kya Kasoor	162	"Dil Ka Kya Kasoor"	Solo	Nadeem-Shravan	
Dilwale Kabhi Na Hare	199	"Hum Pyar Karte Hain"	Nitin Mukesh, Alka Yagnik	Nadeem-Shravan	Sameer
Dilwale Kabhi Na Hare	200	"Dono Ke Husn Mein"	Rajeshwari	Nadeem-Shravan	Sameer
Dilwale Kabhi Na Hare	201	"Tu Meri Hai"	Alka Yagnik	Nadeem-Shravan	Sameer
Dilwale Kabhi Na Hare	202	"Dilwale Kabhi Na Hare"	Shabbir Kumar	Nadeem-Shravan	Sameer
Dilwale Kabhi Na Hare	203	"Ab To Bina Tumhare"	Solo	Nadeem-Shravan	Sameer
Dilwale Kabhi Na Hare	204	"Khushboo Tumhare Pyar Ki"	Alka Yagnik	Nadeem-Shravan	Sameer
Do Hanso Ka Joda	246	"Dushman Dilon Ka Jhala"	Solo	Dilip Sen - Sameer Sen	
Dushman Zamana	254	"Mausam Pyara Bheega Bheega"	Alka Yagnik	Mahesh - Kishore	Anwar Sagar
Dushman Zamana	255	"Mohabbat Ki Kitabon Mein"	Solo	Mahesh - Kishore	Anwar Sagar
Ek Ladka Ek Ladki	198	"Kitna Pyar Tumhe Karte Hain"	Sadhana Sargam	Anand–Milind	Majrooh Sultanpuri
Geet	258	"Prem Patra Aaya Hai Usne Bulaya Hai"	Solo	Bappi Lahiri	Anjaan
Geet	259	"Tujh Se Mujhe Pyar Tha"	Alka Yagnik	Bappi Lahiri	Anjaan
Ghazab Tamasha	249	"Deewana Deewana"	Kavita Krishnamurthy	Anand–Milind	Sameer
Ghazab Tamasha	250	"Pee Ke Shiv Shankar"	Sadhana Sargam	Anand–Milind	Sameer
Ghazab Tamasha	251	"Duniya To Yaar Hai"	Solo	Anand–Milind	Sameer
Ghazab Tamasha	252	"Duniya To Yaar Hai (Sad)"	Solo	Anand–Milind	Sameer
Ghazab Tamasha	253	"Chunri Pyar Ki Udai"	Kavita Krishnamurthy	Anand–Milind	Sameer
Insaaf Ki Devi	234	"Aankhon Mein Pali"	Alka Yagnik	Bappi Lahiri	Indeevar
Insaaf Ki Devi	235	"Aankhon Mein Pali–2"	Alka Yagnik	Bappi Lahiri	Indeevar
Jaan Tere Naam	163	"Akha India Janta Hai"	Solo	Nadeem-Shravan	Rani Malik, Nawab Arzoo, Surendra Sathi, Dev Kohli
Jaan Tere Naam	164	"Rone Na Dijiyega"	Solo	Nadeem-Shravan	
Jaan Tere Naam	165	"Romance Period"	Solo	Nadeem-Shravan	
Jaan Tere Naam	166	"Hum Lakh Chhupaye"	Asha Bhosle	Nadeem-Shravan	
Jaan Tere Naam	167	"Maine Yeh Dil"	Alka Yagnik	Nadeem-Shravan	
Jaan Tere Naam	168	"In The Morning By The Sea"	Alka Yagnik, Udit Narayan	Nadeem-Shravan	
Jeena Marna Tere Sang	139	"Chaha Hai Tumhein"	Anuradha Paudwal	Dilip Sen - Sameer Sen	Sameer
Jigar	140	"Aaye Hum Barati"	Kavita Krishnamurthy	Anand–Milind	Sameer
Junoon	207	"Jo Pyar Kar Gaye Wo Log Aur Thy"	Solo	Nadeem-Shravan	Santosh Anand
Kal Ki Awaz	190	"Aaj Raat Chandni Hai"	Sadhana Sargam, Alka Yagnik	Nadeem-Shravan	Sameer
Kal Ki Awaz	191	"Jabse Dekha Tumko"	Asha Bhosle	Nadeem-Shravan	Sameer
Kal Ki Awaz	192	"Kyon Ladkiyan Humse"	Asha Bhosle	Nadeem-Shravan	Sameer
Kal Ki Awaz	193	"Kisi Meherban Ne Aake"	Asha Bhosle	Nadeem-Shravan	Sameer
Kal Ki Awaz	194	"Kar Na Sake Hum Pyar Ka Sauda"	Asha Bhosle	Nadeem-Shravan	Sameer
Kal Ki Awaz	195	"Sabse Hum Door Huye"	Sadhana Sargam	Nadeem-Shravan	Sameer
Kal Ki Awaz	196	"Tumhari Nazron Mein Humne Dekha"	Asha Bhosle	Nadeem-Shravan	Sameer
Kal Ki Awaz	197	"Aaj Raat Chandni Hai–Duet"	Sadhana Sargam	Nadeem-Shravan	Sameer
Kasak	227	"Mili Tere Pyar Ki"	Anuradha Paudwal	Rajesh Roshan	Indeevar
Khel	175	"Zindagi Ke Khel Mein"	Alka Yagnik	Rajesh Roshan	Javed Akhtar
Khiladi	136	"Dekha Teri Mast"	Asha Bhosle	Jatin–Lalit	Mahendra Dehlvi
Laat Saab	238	"Hirni Jaisi Aankhon Wali"	Solo	Anu Malik	Gulshan Bawra
Laat Saab	239	"Dedo Dedo Mujhe Dil"	Alka Yagnik	Anu Malik	Gulshan Bawra
Mashooq	212	"Deewana Dil Dhoondhe"	Solo	Shyam - Surender	Indeevar, Gauhar Kanpuri
Mashooq	213	"Tumhe Dil To De Chuke"	Kavita Krishnamurthy	Shyam - Surender	
Mashooq	214	"O Sarphiri O Diwani"	Solo	Shyam - Surender	
Mashooq	215	"Ye Dharkan Mere Dil Ki"	Kavita Krishnamurthy	Shyam - Surender	
Mashooq	216	"Too Bhi Tadpegi	Solo	Shyam - Surender	
Mashooq	217	"O Yara O Yara"	Kavita Krishnamurthy	Shyam - Surender	
Meera Ka Mohan	240	"Mere Liye Zaruri Pyar Tera"	Anuradha Paudwal	Arun Paudwal	Indeevar
Meera Ka Mohan	241	"Krishna O Krishna"	Anuradha Paudwal	Arun Paudwal	Indeevar
Meera Ka Mohan	242	"Jab Jab Tujh Ko Dekha"	Anuradha Paudwal	Arun Paudwal	Indeevar
Mere Meharban	243	"Tere Kale Hai Baal"	Asha Bhosle	Bappi Lahiri	R.K. Saharawat
Mere Meharban	244	"O Mr. Prince, Hi Miss Queen"	Alka Yagnik	Bappi Lahiri	R.K. Saharawat
Mere Meharban	245	"Maar Katari Mar Jaon"	Solo	Bappi Lahiri	Ashok Verma
Mere Meharban	246	"Bahut Din Huye"	Solo	Bappi Lahiri	Ashok Verma
Muskurahat	247	"Banda Nawaz Izzat Nawaz"	Sadhana Sargam	Raamlaxman	Suraj Sanim
Muskurahat	248	"Gun Gun Karta Aaya"	Sadhana Sargam	Raamlaxman	Suraj Sanim
Naach Govinda Naach	228	"Yeh Bachpan"	Sangeet Haldipuri	Amar-Utpal	Amjaan
Nagin Aur Lootere	236	"Sau Sau Janmon Wala"	Sadhana Sargam	Anand-Laxman	Asad Ajmeri
Naya Sawan	224	"Pyar Agar Tum Karte Ho"	Lata Mangeshkar	Bappi Lahiri	Anjaan
Paayal	218	"Meree Duniya Me Aana"	Sadhana Sargam	Nadeem-Shravan	Sameer
Paayal	219	"Tera Hi Pyaar Iss Dil Mein Rahega"	Alka Yagnik	Nadeem-Shravan	Sameer
Paayal	220	"Mere Mehboob Meri Jaane Jigar"	Sadhana Sargam	Nadeem-Shravan	Sameer
Paayal	221	"Mohabbat Naa Karana"	Sadhana Sargam	Nadeem-Shravan	Sameer
Paayal	222	"Mere Mehboob Meri Jaane Jigar (Sad)"	Solo	Nadeem-Shravan	Sameer
Panaah	205	"Kabhi Lage Ke Ye Sara Sach Hai"	Alka Yagnik, Sadhana Sargam, Udit Narayan	Nadeem-Shravan	Vishweshwar Sharma
Panaah	206	"Thoda Matke Se Paani Jara De"	Sadhana Sargam	Nadeem-Shravan	Vishweshwar Sharma
Pitambar	230	"Dil Ne Tujhe Yaad Kiya"	Sadhana Sargam	Suraj Khan	Khalid
Pitambar	231	"Sajana Sajana O Sajana"	Sadhana Sargam	Suraj Khan	Khalid
Pitambar	232	"Aaja Sanan Mere Paas"	Dilraj Kaur	Suraj Khan	Khalid
Pitambar	233	"Aaja Aaja Na Na"	Sadhana Sargam	Suraj Khan	Khalid
Police Aur Mujrim	169	"Dil Ghabrata Hai Aankh Bhar Aati Hai ",	Solo	Bappi Lahiri	Anjaan
Police Aur Mujrim	170	"Dil Ghabrata Hai (Sad)"	Solo	Bappi Lahiri	Anjaan
Parasmani	223	"Is Duniya Mein"	Kavita Krishnamurti	Anand-Laxman	
Pyar Deewana Hota Hai	266	"Kya Yehi Pyar Hai"	Alka Yagnik	Babul Bose	
Pyar Deewana Hota Hai	267	"Pyar Deewana Hota Hai"		Babul Bose	
Pyar Deewana Hota Hai	268	"Mere Man Ka Masum"		Babul Bose	
Raju Ban Gaya Gentleman	145	"Kya Hua"	Alka Yagnik, Jolly Mukherjee	Jatin–Lalit	Mahendra Dehlvi
Raju Ban Gaya Gentleman	146	"Raju Ban Gaya Gentleman"	Sudesh Bhonsle, Sadhana Sargam, Jolly Mukherjee	Jatin–Lalit	Dev Kohli
Raju Ban Gaya Gentleman	147	"Dil Hai Mera Deewana"	Solo	Jatin–Lalit	Dev Kohli
Raju Ban Gaya Gentleman	148	"Kehti Hai Dil Ki Lagi"	Alka Yagnik	Jatin–Lalit	Vinod Mahendra
Raju Ban Gaya Gentleman	149	"Tu Mere Saath Saath"	Alka Yagnik	Jatin–Lalit	Mahendra Dehlvi
Raju Ban Gaya Gentleman	150	"Tham Tham Tham"	Alka Yagnik	Jatin–Lalit	Manoj Darpan
Raju Ban Gaya Gentleman	151	"Seene Mein Dil Hai"	Alka Yagnik	Jatin–Lalit	Madan Pal
Sanam Tere Hain Hum	265	"Aaj Mere Paas Rehna"	Anupama Deshpande	Bappi Lahiri	
Sapne Sajan Ke	141	"Yeh Dua Hai Meri"	Alka Yagnik	Nadeem-Shravan	Sameer
Sapne Sajan Ke	142	"Sapne Sajan Ke"	Alka Yagnik	Nadeem-Shravan	Sameer
Sapne Sajan Ke	143	"Aa Raha Hai Maza"	Alka Yagnik	Nadeem-Shravan	Sameer
Sapne Sajan Ke	144	"Shikwa Karoon Ya Shikayat Karoon"	Alka Yagnik	Nadeem-Shravan	Sameer
Suryavanshi	226	"Main Nahin Kehta"	Asha Bhosle	Anand–Milind	Kulwant Jani
Tahalka	153	"Dil Diwane Ka Dola Dildaar Ke Liye"	Anuradha Paudwal, Babla Mehta	Anu Malik	Hasrat Jaipuri
Tyagi	181	"Laut Ke Aaja Re Oh O"	Kavita Krishnamurthy	Bappi Lahiri	Gulzar, K.K Verma, Indeevar
Tyagi	182	"Mujhko To Kuchh Kuchh Hota Hai	Asha Bhosle	Bappi Lahiri	
Tyagi	183	"Hello Hello Tanha Dil Ghabrata Hai"	Sapna Mukherjee	Bappi Lahiri	
Umar 55 Ki Dil Bachpan Ka	243	"Jab Se Mila Hai Mujhe"	Anuradha Paudwal	Dilip Sen - Sameer Sen	Yogesh
Umar 55 Ki Dil Bachpan Ka	244	"Yeh Dil Kaho To Dedo"	Alka Yagnik	Dilip Sen - Sameer Sen	Yogesh
Umar 55 Ki Dil Bachpan Ka	245	"Jab Se Mila Hai Mujhe Pyar (Sad)"	Solo	Dilip Sen - Sameer Sen	Yogesh
Virodhi	172	"Tere Mere Pyar Ka"	Mohammed Aziz, Sarika Kapoor	Anu Malik	Dev Kohli
Virodhi	173	"Jaanam Jaanam Jaanam"	Asha Bhosle	Anu Malik	Dev Kohli
Virodhi	174	"Nain Kabootar Udh Gaye"	Asha Bhosle	Anu Malik	Dev Kohli
Vishwatma	156	"Dil Le Gaye Teri Bindiya"	Mohammad Aziz, Udit Narayan, Sadhana Sargam & Sapna Mukherjee	Viju Shah	Anand Bakhshi
Waqt Ka Badshah	256	"Har Dil Jo Pyar Karega"	Jayashree Shivram	Amar-Utpal	
Yalgaar	154	"Ho Jaata Hai Kaise Pyar"	Sapna Mukherjee	Channi Singh	Sudarshan Faakir
Yalgaar	155	"Sheher Mein Gaon Mein"	Solo	Channi Singh	Sudarshan Faakir
Yeh Raat Phir Na Aayegi	225	"Tu Muskura Tu Muskura"	Anuradha Paudwal	Rajesh Roshan	Ibrahim Ashq, Raj Tilak, Payam Sayeedi
Yoddha	264	"Ye Resham Kee Saari"	Solo	Pappu Khan	
Yudhpath	237	"Chane Laga Aisa Nasha"	Kavita Krishnamurthy	Dilip Sen - Sameer Sen	Rani Malik
Zindagi Ek Juaa	260	"Kabhi Kuch Khoya Kabhi Kuch Paya"	Solo	Bappi Lahiri	Prakash Mehra, Anjaan
Zindagi Ek Juaa	261	"Yeh Zindagi Hai Ek Juaa"	Solo	Bappi Lahiri	
Zindagi Ek Juaa	262	"Yun Ghur Ghur Ghurke"	Solo	Bappi Lahiri	
Zindagi Ek Juaa	263	"Dil To Dil Hai Dil Ka Kya Hai"	Solo	Bappi Lahiri	
Zulm Ki Hukumat	171	"Khathmandu Khathmandu"	Solo	Dilil Sen - Sameer Sen	Sameer

=== 1993 ===
Film(s)	No.	Song name(s)	Co-singer(s)	Music director(s)	Lyricist(s)
15 August	365	"Aankhon Se Teri Sanam"	Alka Yagnik	Rajan-Arvind	Rani Malik
15 August	366	"Dil Ke Kareeb Aake"		Rajan-Arvind	Rani Malik
15 August	367	"Jhoom E Dil Woh Mera"		Rajan-Arvind	Rani Malik
15 August	368	"Tumhi Ho Mehboob Mere"		Rajan-Arvind	Rani Malik
Aadmi	304	"Dil Tere Naam Se"	Sadhana Sargam, Kavita Krishnamurthy	Jatin–Lalit	Rani Malik, Anwar Sagar
Aadmi	305	"Jaan Se Bhadkar Janam"		Jatin–Lalit	
Aadmi	306	"Dhak Dhak Dil Mera"		Jatin–Lalit	
Aadmi Khilona Hai	360	"Mehndi Lagane Ki Raat"	Sadhana Sargam	Nadeem-Shravan	Sameer
Aag Ka Toofan	379	"Aisi Waisi Nazron Se"	Alka Yagnik	Bappi Lahiri	Rani Malik, Nawab Arzoo
Aag Ka Toofan	380	"Main Dil Bhar Ke Dekhu Tumhe"		Bappi Lahiri	
Aag Ka Toofan	381	"Tu Chand Se Mukhde"		Bappi Lahiri	
Aaina	313	"Meri Sanson Mein"	Asha Bhosle	Dilip Sen -Sameer Sen	Sameer
Aaj Kie Aurat	411	"Pehle Tum Phir Aap"	Solo, Chandrani Mukherjee	Bappi Lahiri	Indeevar, Prem Pandit, Yusuf Butt
Aaj Kie Aurat	412	"Roshni Andhera Mitathi Hai"		Bappi Lahiri	
Aakhri Chetawani	413	"Dudhia Jisma Gulabi Gaal"	Anupama Deshpande, Mohammed Aziz, Pramod Sarkar	Shrikant Niwaskar	Ahmed Soz, Layalpuri, Saleem Sagar
Aakhri Chetawani	414	"Tum Takum Tum Takum"		Shrikant Niwaskar	
Aakhri Chetawani	415	"Teri Mohabbat Ne Mujhko"	Usha Timothy	Shrikant Niwaskar	
Aankhen	269	"Lal Dupate Wali Tera Naam To Bata"	Alka Yagnik, Sudesh Bhosle, Kavita Krishnamurthy	Bappi Lahiri	Indeevar
Aankhen	270	"Chowkhat Pe Tere"	Mohammed Aziz, Sapna Mukherjee	Bappi Lahiri	Indeevar
Aankhen	271	"Ek Tamannaa Jivan Ki"	Asha Bhosle	Bappi Lahiri	Indeevar
Aankhen	272	"Angana Mein Baba"	Sadhana Sargam	Bappi Lahiri	Indeevar
Aankhen	273	"Bade Kaam Ka Bander"	Mohammed Aziz, Arun Bakshi	Bappi Lahiri	Indeevar
Anari	303	"Pyar Mein Dil De Diya"	Alka Yagnik	Anand–Milind	Sameer
Anmol	387	"Kabhi Main Filmon Mein"	Solo	Raam Laxman	Raam Laxman
Aulad Ke Dushman	333	"Dil Tujhko De Diya"	Alka Yagnik, Sadhana Sargam	Shyam-Surender	Satish Sharma, Rani Malik
Aulad Ke Dushman	334	"Main Tera Deewana Hoon"		Shyam-Surender	
Aulad Ke Dushman	335	"Maine Tumse Pyar Kiya"		Shyam-Surender	
Aulad Ke Dushman	336	"Tum Bhi Ho Bekhabar"		Shyam-Surender	
Aye Meri Bekhudi	363	"Mujhe Pyar Ka Dard"	Solo	Anil Mohile	
Baarish	364	"Ek Ladki Ho Gayi Raji"	Sadhana Sargam	Anand-Milind	
Baazigar	274	"Yeh Kaali Aankhen"	Anu Malik	Anu Malik	Dev Kohli
Baazigar	275	"Baazigar O Baazigar"	Alka Yagnik	Anu Malik	Nawab Arzoo
Baazigar	276	"Tere Chehre Pe"	Sonali Bajpai	Anu Malik	Rani Malik
Balmaa	342	"Agar Zindagi Ho"	Asha Bhosle	Nadeem-Shravan	Sameer
Balmaa	343	"Bansuriya Ab Yeh Pukare"	Asha Bhosle	Nadeem-Shravan	Sameer
Balmaa	344	"Yeh Mausam Bhi Gaya"	Alka Yagnik	Nadeem-Shravan	Sameer
Bechain	374	"Mujhko Tumse Pyar Hai"	Solo	Dilip Sen-Sameer Sen	
Bedardi	337	"Na Meri Zubaan Pe"	Alka Yagnik	Laxmikant-Pyarelal	Anand Bakhshi
Bhookamp	417	"One Two Three"	Alka Yagnik, Kavita Krishnamurthy	Jatin–Lalit	Javed Akhtar, Vinod Mahendra
Bhookamp	418	"Tum Jo Mile"		Jatin–Lalit	
Bhookamp	419	"Yahi Woh Jaga Thi"		Jatin–Lalit	
Boy Friend	369	"Gudiya Jaisi Ladki Hai"	Kavita Krishnamurti	Jatin-Lalit	
Boy Friend	370	"I Am Your Boy Friend"		Jatin-Lalit	
Chandra Mukhi	401	"Chha Raha Hai Pyar Ka Nasha"	Alka Yagnik, Alisha Chinai	Anand–Milind	Sameer
Chandra Mukhi	402	"Tere Dil Ki Baat"		Anand–Milind	Sameer
Chor Aur Chaand	400	"Tere Bin Kahin Jiyara Lage"	Anuradha Paudwal	Nikhil-Vinay	Yogesh
Dalaal	289	"Gutur Gutur"	Solo, Bappi Lahiri, Alka Yagnik, Ila Arun	Bappi Lahiri	Maya Govind, Prakash Mehra, Anjaan
Dalaal	290	"Thahre Huye Paani Mein"	Solo	Bappi Lahiri	
Dalaal	291	"Chori Chori Maine Bhi To"	Kavita Krishnamurthy	Bappi Lahiri	
Dalaal	292	"Na Unees Se Kam"	Solo	Bappi Lahiri	
Dalaal	293	"Mere Ramji Mere Bhagwanji"		Bappi Lahiri	
Damini	299	"Jab Se Tumko Dekha Hai Sanam"	Sadhana Sargam	Nadeem-Shravan	Sameer
Damini	300	"Gawah Hain Chand Taare"	Alka Yagnik	Nadeem-Shravan	Sameer
Damini	301	"Bin Sajan Jhoola Jhoolu"	Sadhana Sargam	Nadeem-Shravan	Sameer
Damini	302	"Sacha Aashiq Hai To"	Alka Yagnik	Nadeem-Shravan	Sameer
Dhartiputra	321	"Saare Rango Se Hai"	Alka Yagnik, Alisha Chinai	Nadeem-Shravan	Sameer
Dhartiputra	322	"Khamoshi Hai Ek Baja Hai"		Nadeem-Shravan	Sameer
Dhartiputra	323	"Mera Tohfa Too Kar Le Kabool"		Nadeem-Shravan	Sameer
Dhartiputra	324	"Mausam Rangila Hai"		Nadeem-Shravan	Sameer
Dil Apne Aur Preet Paraee	426	"Abhi Abhi Maine Khat"	Kavita Krishnamurti, Alka Yagnik	Usha Khanna	
Dil Apne Aur Preet Paraee	427	"Dil Apna Preet Parayi"		Usha Khanna	
Dil Apne Aur Preet Paraee	428	"Koun Root Ke Tum"		Usha Khanna	
Dil Apne Aur Preet Paraee	429	"Yeh Aankhen Yeh Palke"		Usha Khanna	
Dil Tera Aashiq	340	"Dil Tera Aashiq"	Alka Yagnik	Nadeem-Shravan	Sameer
Dil Tera Aashiq	341	"Pyar Ke Badle Pyar Milega"		Nadeem-Shravan	Sameer
Divya Shakti	348	"Aapko Dekh Kar"	Alka Yagnik	Nadeem-Shravan	Sameer
Divya Shakti	349	"Batha Mujko Sanam Mere"	Alka Yagnik	Nadeem-Shravan	Sameer
Divya Shakti	350	"Nahin Nahin Kabhi Nahin"		Nadeem-Shravan	Sameer
Divya Shakti	351	"Sang Sang Chalunga Mein"		Nadeem-Shravan	Sameer
Divya Shakti	352	"O Mere Gudde Raja"	Asha Bhosle	Nadeem-Shravan	Sameer
Dosti Ki Saugandh	435	"Dhak Dhak Dil Dhadke"	Poornima, Alka Yagnik	Surinder Kohli	
Dosti Ki Saugandh	436	"Ek Pal Aaja Re Mahiya"		Surinder Kohli	
Dosti Ki Saugandh	437	"Meri Choli Me Chhappan Karod"		Surinder Kohli	
Ek Hi Raasta	385	"Tere Mere Pyar Ka"	Bela Sulakhe, Sadhana Sargam	Mahesh-Kishor	Gulshan Bawra, Kulwant Jani
Ek Hi Raasta	386	"Meri Seeti Baj Gayee"		Mahesh-Kishor	
Geetanjali	391	"Pyar Ke Rishte"	Kavita Krishnamurthy, Solo	Bappi Lahiri	Indeevar
Geetanjali	392	"Bina Tumhare Char Kadam"		Bappi Lahiri	Indeevar
Geetanjali	393	"Tumhe Chahata Hoon"		Bappi Lahiri	Indeevar
Ghar Aaya Mera Pardesi	382	"Tera Naam Mera Naam"	Anuradha Paudwal	Vijay Singh	Dev Kohli
Hasti	359	"Mat Poochh Mere Mehboob"	Mukul Agarwal, Sadhana Sargam	Anand Milind	Sameer
Hum Anaaree Hain	360	"Phir Aashiqui Ki Had Se Guzar"	Poornima	Anand–Milind	Sameer
Hum Anaaree Hain	361	"Hey Tune Mujhe Pehli Nazar"	Alka Yagnik	Anand–Milind	Sameer
Hum Hain Kamaal Ke	425	"Bas Yahi Jee Chahta Hai"	Alka Yagnik	Naresh Sharma	Rani Malik
Hum Hain Rahi Pyar Ke	281	"Ghunghat Ki Aad Se"	Alka Yagnik	Nadeem-Shravan	Sameer
Hum Hain Rahi Pyar Ke	282	"Mujhse Mohabbat Ka Izhar"	Alka Yagnik	Nadeem-Shravan	Sameer
Hum Hain Rahi Pyar Ke	283	"Yunhi Kat Jaayega Safar Saath"	Alka Yagnik	Nadeem-Shravan	Sameer
Hum Hain Rahi Pyar Ke	284	"Chikni Soorat Tu Kahan Tha"	Solo	Nadeem-Shravan	Sameer
Insaniyat Ke Devta	403	"Suno To Zara"	Sadhna Sargam	Anand–Milind	Sameer
Ishq Aur Inteeqaam	375	"Pyar Pe Yakeen Hai"	Kavita Krishnamurthy	Bhoopi-Ratan	G.P. Sateesh
Ishq Aur Inteeqaam	376	"Meri Jaan Ne Mujhse"			G.P. Sateesh
Izzat Ki Roti	407	"Chori Chori Pyar Mein"	Anuradha Paudwal	Bappi Lahiri	Indeevar, Anjaan
Izzat Ki Roti	408	"Mausam Badle To Badle"		Bappi Lahiri	
Jeena Nahin Bin Tere	409	"Mere Haathon Ki Lakeere"	Alka Yagnik	Rajesh Roshan	Naqsh Lyallpuri
Kaise Kaise Rishte	404	"Bhiga Hai Mausam Khali Hai Ghar"	Alka Yagnik, Alisha Chinai	Nadeem-Shravan	Sameer
Kaise Kaise Rishte	405	"Phoolon Se Zyaada"		Nadeem-Shravan	Sameer
Kaise Kaise Rishte	406	"Ho Gaya Hai Pyaar"		Nadeem-Shravan	Sameer
Kanyadaan	407	"Mausam Haseen Ye Pyara"	Chorus	Aadesh Shrivastava	Shyamraj
Kanyadaan	408	"Tu Meri Shairi"	Alka Yagnik	Aadesh Shrivastava	Shyamraj
Kanyadaan	409	"Mere Seene Mein Teri Dhadkan"	Alka Yagnik	Aadesh Shrivastava	Madan Pal
Kanyadaan	410	"Maina Bol Rahi"	Asha Bhosle	Aadesh Shrivastava	Shyamraj
Kasam Teri Kasam	373	"Halchal Yeh Kaisi Halchal"	Anuradha Paudwal	Naresh Sharma	
Kayda Kanoon	388	"Aankho Mein Nahi Dil Mein"	Sadhana Sargam	Anand–Milind	Sameer
King Uncle	384	"Dil Mane Jise Wohi Apna"	Solo	Rajesh Roshan	Indeevar
Kohra	431	"O Bewafa Bewafa Bewafa"	Sadhana Sargam, Kavita Krishnamurthy		
Kohra	432	"Chhodo Gussa Jane Jana"			
Kohra	433	"Mausam Rangeen Hai Kitna Hasin Hai"			
Kohra	434	"Tujhe Meri Kasam Mere Sir Ki Kasam"			
Lootere	285	"Main Teri Rani Tu Raja Mera"	Alka Yagnik, Anupama Deshpande	Anand–Milind	Majrooh Sultanpuri
Lootere	286	"Jis Dil Ne Tujh Ko"		Anand–Milind	Majrooh Sultanpuri
Mahakaal	371	"Main Khush Naseeb Hoon"	Anuradha Paudwal	Anand-Milind	Sameer
Maya Memsaab	362	"Ek Haseen Nigah Ka"	Solo	Hridaynath Mangeshkar	Gulzar
Meera Ke Girdhar	397	"Tum Par Chodi Jeevan Naiyya"	Solo	Kanak Raj	Zaheer Anwar
Meri Aan	394	"Is Nazar Ne Kabhi"	Asha Bhosle, Sadhana Sargam, Solo	Ravindra Jain	Ravindra Jain
Meri Aan	395	"Wo Wada Hi Kya Jo"		Ravindra Jain	Ravindra Jain
Meri Aan	396	"Bewafa Ajnabi"		Ravindra Jain	Ravindra Jain
My Story	438	"Sagar Ke Jaisa Hai Pyar Yeh Tumhara"	Sadhana Sargam	Kanak Raj	Zaheer Anwar
My Story	439	"Jane Kahan Wo"	Solo	Kanak Raj	Zaheer Anwar
Pardesi	372	"Pardesi Laut Ke Aana"	Anuradha Paudwal	Anand-Milind	Sameer
Parwane	389	"Jee Chahata Hai"	Solo, Kavita Krishnamurthy	Anand–Milind	Sameer
Parwane	390	"Ye Ladki Badi"		Anand–Milind	Sameer
Phir Teri Kahani Yaad Aayee	277	"Tere Dar Par Sanam Chale Aaye"	Solo	Anu Malik	Qateel Shifai
Phir Teri Kahani Yaad Aayee	278	"Dil Mein Sanam Ki Soorat"	Alka Yagnik	Anu Malik	
Phir Teri Kahani Yaad Aayee	279	"Badlon Mein Chup Raha Hai Chand Kyun"	Alka Yagnik	Anu Malik	
Phir Teri Kahani Yaad Aayee	280	"Aane Wala Kal Ek Sapna Hai"	Solo	Anu Malik	Kaifi Azmi
Phool	415	"Kitna Pyar Karta Hoon"	Solo, Sadhana Sargam	Anand Milind	Anand Bakshi
Phool	416	"Do Deewane"		Anand Milind	Anand Bakshi
Phool Aur Angaar	287	"Chori Chori Dil Tera"	Sujata Goswamy	Anu Malik	Rani Malik
Phool Aur Angaar	288	"Hum Teri Mohabbat Mein"	Sadhana Sargam	Anu Malik	Rani Malik
Phoolan Hasina Ramkali	383	"Chori Chori Jab Yun Ho"	Solo	Dilip Sen - Sameer Sen	Mahendra Dahelvi
Platform	361	"Ek Din Jagda Ek Din Pyar"	Sadhana Sargam	Anand–Milind	Sameer
Prateeksha	409	"Are Nachein Aaj To"	Solo	Rajesh Roshan	Indeevar
Prateeksha	410	"Doston Aaj Sur Aur Taal"	Govinda & Bonny	Rajesh Roshan	Indeevar
Pyar Pyar	398	"Ek Tere Hi Chehre Pe Pyar Aaya"	Anuradha Paudwal	Nadeem-Shravan	
Pyar Pyar	399	"Paas Mera Ghar Hai"		Nadeem-Shravan	
Rang	294	"Tumhein Dekhen Meri Aankhein"	Alka Yagnik	Nadeem-Shravan	Sameer
Rang	295	"Teri Mohabbat Ne"	Alka Yagnik	Nadeem-Shravan	Sameer
Rang	296	"Tujhe Na Dekhoon"	Alka Yagnik	Nadeem-Shravan	Sameer
Rang	297	"Dil Cheer Ke Dekh"	Solo	Nadeem-Shravan	Sameer
Rang	298	"Mere Pyar Ka Hisab"		Nadeem-Shravan	Sameer
Rani Aur Maharaani	430	"Dil Ki Dhadkan Mein Hai Tu"	Anuradha Poudwal	Jeetu Tapan	
Sainik	329	"Kitni Hasrat Hai Hamein"	Sadhana Sargam	Nadeem-Shravan	Sameer
Sainik	330	"Meri Wafayen Yaad Karoge"	Asha Bhosle	Nadeem-Shravan	Sameer
Sainik	331	"Jaam Woh Hai"	Solo	Nadeem-Shravan	Sameer
Sainik	332	"Babul Ka Ghar"	Alka Yagnik	Nadeem-Shravan	Sameer
Sangram	314	"Bheegi Huyee Hain Raat"	Kavita Krishnamurthy	Nadeem-Shravan	Sameer
Sangram	315	"Dil Mein Mohabbat Hain"	P. Sunanda, Alka Yagnik	Nadeem-Shravan	Sameer
Sangram	316	"Jeetega Wohi Jisme Hai Dam"		Nadeem-Shravan	Sameer
Sangram	317	"Beshak Tum Meri Mohabbat Ho"		Nadeem-Shravan	Sameer
Sangram	318	"Sajana Ban Ke Phiru"		Nadeem-Shravan	Sameer
Santaan	338	"Zubaan Zubaan Pe Hogi"	Alka Yagnik	Anand–Milind	Sameer
Santaan	339	"Kaanton Ko Na Samjho"		Anand–Milind	Sameer
Shatranj	319	"Dil Pe Tere Pyar"	Sadhana Sargam	Anand–Milind	
Shatranj	320	"Koi Nahin"	Jolly Mukherjee	Anand–Milind	
Shreemaan Aashique	345	"Aasman Tak Jaa Pahuchengi"	Alka Yagnik, Sadhana Sargam	Nadeem-Shravan	Sameer
Shreemaan Aashique	346	"Chum Loon Honth Tere"		Nadeem-Shravan	Sameer
Shreemaan Aashique	347	"Dekha Jabse Tujhe"		Nadeem-Shravan	Sameer
Sir	307	"Jis Din Suraj Ki"	Solo, Alka Yagnik, Kavita Krishnamurthy,	Anu Malik	Qateel Shifai
Sir	308	"Aaj Humne Dil Ka"		Anu Malik	
Sir	309	"Sun Sun Barasat Ki Dhun"		Anu Malik	
Sir	310	"Yeh Ujali Chandani"		Anu Malik	
Sir	311	"Hum Se Badal Gaya"		Anu Malik	
Sir	312	"Band Hoton Se"		Anu Malik	
Tadipaar	325	"Aaj Pahli Baar Dil Ki Baat"	Alka Yagnik, Sadhana Sargam	Nadeem-Shravan	Sameer
Tadipaar	326	"Bikhri Zulfon Ko"		Nadeem-Shravan	Sameer
Tadipaar	327	"Pyaar Ka Pahla Saal Hai"	Sadhana Sargam	Nadeem-Shravan	Sameer
Tadipaar	328	"Aap Ki Dushmani Kabool"	Solo	Nadeem-Shravan	Sameer
Tum Karo Vaada	356	"Ise Pyaar Kahiye"	Asha Bhosle	R. D. Burman	
Tum Karo Vaada	357	"Tujhe Pyaar Karne Se"		R. D. Burman	
Tum Karo Vaada	358	"Tum Karo Vaada"		R. D. Burman	
Veerta	422	"Beli O Beli"	Solo, Asha Bhosle, Debasish Dasgupta	Bappi Lahiri	
Veerta	423	"Na Na Na Tujhe Nahi Nahi Jana"		Bappi Lahiri	
Veerta	424	"O Chooday Wali Chhamiya"		Bappi Lahiri	
Vishnu Vijaya	377	"Dil Ki Ghadi Are Ghadi Ghadi"	Alka Yagnik, Kavita Krishnomurti	Jatin-Lalit	
Vishnu Vijaya	378	"Deewane Tu Hai Jahan"		Jatin-Lalit	
Waqt Hamara Hai	353	"Yeh Waqt Hamara Hai"	Alka Yagnik, Asha Bhosle, Sudesh Bhosle	Nadeem-Shravan	Sameer
Waqt Hamara Hai	354	"Kachi Kali Kache Naarke"		Nadeem-Shravan	Sameer
Waqt Hamara Hai	355	"Tumko Dekha Aur Ho Gaya"		Nadeem-Shravan	Sameer
Zakhmo Ka Hisaab	420	"Aanewala Kal Ka Suraj"	Solo	Rajesh Roshan	Anwar Sagar
Zakhmo Ka Hisaab	421	"Jeene Ke Liye"	Solo	Rajesh Roshan	Anwar Sagar

=== 1994 ===
Film(s)	No.	Song name(s)	Co-Singer(s)	Music director(s)	Lyricist(s)
1942: A Love Story	467	"Ek Ladki Ko Dekha"	Solo	R.D.Burman	Javed Akhtar
1942: A Love Story	468	"Rimjhim Rimjhim"	Kavita Krishnamurti	R.D.Burman	Javed Akhtar
1942: A Love Story	469	"Rooth Na Jana"		R.D.Burman	Javed Akhtar
1942: A Love Story	470	"Kuch Na Kaho"		R.D.Burman	Javed Akhtar
Aa Gale Lag Jaa	505	"Aaj Humein Malum Hua"	Solo, Anuradha Paudwal, Alka Yagnik, Kavita Krishnamurthy, Vibha Sharma, Sujata Goswami	Anu Malik	Anwar Sagar
Aa Gale Lag Jaa	506	"Tere Baghair"		Anu Malik	Anwar Sagar
Aa Gale Lag Jaa	507	"Yaad Teri Aati Hai"		Anu Malik	Anwar Sagar
Aa Gale Lag Jaa	508	"Main Aashique Hoon"		Anu Malik	Anwar Sagar
Aag	517	"Ankhon Mein Tum Ho"	Alka Yagnik, Solo Poornima	Dilip Sen - Sameer Sen	Sameer
Aag	518	"Main Tera Majnu"		Dilip Sen - Sameer Sen	Sameer
Aag	519	"Muskura Ke Jiyo Zindagi"		Dilip Sen - Sameer Sen	Sameer
Aag Aur Chingari	587	"Tumko Mujhse Pyaar Hai"	Alka Yagnik	Bappi Lahiri	K.K Verma
Aao Pyaar Karen	571	"Chand Se Parda Ki Jiye"	Solo, Sadhana Sargam, Vijeta Pandit, Poornima	Aadesh Shrivastava	Shyam Raj
Aao Pyaar Karen	572	"Haathon Mein Aa Gaya Jo Kal"		Aadesh Shrivastava	Shyam Raj
Aao Pyaar Karen	573	"Jab Do Dil Milte Hain"		Aadesh Shrivastava	Shyam Raj
Aao Pyaar Karen	574	"Kyun Phool Khilte Hain"		Aadesh Shrivastava	Shyam Raj
Aao Pyaar Karen	575	"Oee Maa Ye Kya Ho Gaya"		Aadesh Shrivastava	Shyam Raj
Aatish: Feel the Fire	450	"Aa Aa Mere Dilruba"	Sapna Mukherjee, Sadhana Sargam, Alka Yagnik	Nadeem-Shravan	Sameer
Aatish: Feel the Fire	451	"Hasratein Hain Bahut Magar"		Nadeem-Shravan	Sameer
Aatish: Feel the Fire	452	"Kaash Tum Mujhse Ek Baar Kaho"	Solo	Nadeem-Shravan	Sameer
Aatish: Feel the Fire	453	"Khaate Hain Hum Kasam"		Nadeem-Shravan	Sameer
Aatish: Feel the Fire	454	"Dheela Pajama"		Nadeem-Shravan	Sameer
Amaanat	520	"Daloonga Daloonga Pyar Se"	Alka Yagnik, Ila Arun, Kavita Krishnamurthy, Solo	Bappi Lahiri	Anwar Sagar, Maya Govind, Indeevar, Ravi Anand
Amaanat	521	"Din Mein Leti"		Bappi Lahiri	
Amaanat	522	"Gori Gori Gori"		Bappi Lahiri	
Amaanat	523	"Is Duniya Mein Jo Bhi Hota Hai"		Bappi Lahiri	
Amaanat	524	"Tumse Milna Milkar Chalna"		Bappi Lahiri	
Amaanat	525	"Ho Gaya Ji Ho Gaya"		Bappi Lahiri	
Andaz	476	"Dil Ka Panchi Bole"	Alka Yagnik, Kavita Krishnamurthy	Bappi Lahiri	Indeevar
Andaz	477	"Laila Bechari Ka Karti"		Bappi Lahiri	Indeevar
Andaz	478	"Lelo Lelo Mera Imtihan"		Bappi Lahiri	Indeevar
Andaz Tera Mastana	479	"Tum Mujhe Itna Pyar"	Alka Yagnik	Anand–Milind	
Andaz Tera Mastana	480	"Main Apni Zindagi"	Solo	Anand–Milind	
Anth	598	"Jaane Jaa Dil Na Jala"	Kavita Krishnamurthy, Sadhana Sargam	Anand–Milind	Sameer
Anth	599	"Tu Deewani Main Deewana"		Anand–Milind	Sameer
Baali Umar Ko Salam	603	"Meri Zindagi Teri Chahat Ke Naam"	Alka Yagnik, Rajshree Biswas	Bappi Lahiri	Nawab Aarzoo
Baali Umar Ko Salam	604	"Darte Darte Tum Kaho Kuch"		Bappi Lahiri	Nawab Aarzoo
Baali Umar Ko Salam	605	"Aakho Se Aakhe Milau To"		Bappi Lahiri	Nawab Aarzoo
Baali Umar Ko Salam	606	"Ding Dong Ding Dong"		Bappi Lahiri	Nawab Aarzoo
Betaaj Badshah	515	"Ek Chadar Do Sonewale"	Poornima, Solo	Anand–Milind	Sameer
Betaaj Badshah	516	"Hansi Hansi Mein Kabhi Dil"		Anand–Milind	Sameer
Brahma	561	"Hans Ke Guzari Zindegi"	Solo, Alka Yagnik	Bappi Lahiri	Prayag Raj
Brahma	562	"Pehle Pehle Pyar Ka"		Bappi Lahiri	Prayag Raj
Brahma	563	"Pyar Ka Zamana"		Bappi Lahiri	Prayag Raj
Cheetah	496	"Ye Tera Sajna Sawarna"	Alka Yagnik	Jatin–Lalit	Anwar Sagar, Dev Kohli
Cheetah	497	"Ye Kudi Mera Dil Le Gayi"		Jatin–Lalit	
Chhoti Bahoo	607	"Kha Kasam Kha"	Alka Yagnik, Sapna Mukherjee, Solo	Nadeem-Shravan	Sameer
Chhoti Bahoo	608	"O Laila Hum Tum Pe"		Nadeem-Shravan	Sameer
Chhoti Bahoo	609	"Meri Baat Ko Hansi"		Nadeem-Shravan	Sameer
Dilbar	622	"Hum Tum Yun Milte Rahe To"	Kavita Krishnamurthy, Solo, Alka Yagnik	Laxmikant–Pyarelal	Anand Bakhshi
Dilbar	623	"Mere Dil Mein Lage Hain"		Laxmikant–Pyarelal	Anand Bakhshi
Dilbar	624	"Padh Leti Hai Nazar"		Laxmikant–Pyarelal	Anand Bakhshi
Dilbar	625	"Sabhi Ko Khuda Ki Khudai"	Alka Yagnik	Laxmikant–Pyarelal	Anand Bakhshi
Dilwale	456	"Kitna Haseen Chehra"	Alka Yagnik, Solo	Nadeem-Shravan	Sameer
Dilwale	457	"Jeeta Hoon Jiske Liye"		Nadeem-Shravan	Sameer
Dilwale	458	"Jeeta Tha Jiske Liye"		Nadeem-Shravan	Sameer
Dilwale	459	"Jo Tumhein Chahe"		Nadeem-Shravan	Sameer
Dilwale	460	"Saaton Janam Main Tere"		Nadeem-Shravan	Sameer
Dilwale	461	"Ek Aisi Ladki"		Nadeem-Shravan	Sameer
Dulaara	498	"Tumhi Se Tumhi Ko"	Alka Yagnik	Nikhil-Vinay	Rani Malik, Yogesh
Dulaara	499	"Sajan Re Sajan Kehta"		Nikhil-Vinay	
Dulaara	500	"Dil Yahin Kahin Kho"		Nikhil-Vinay	
Eena Meena Deeka	493	"Eena Ko Mil Gayee Meena"	Poornima	Anand–Milind	Sameer
Eena Meena Deeka	494	"Towel Mein Baahar Jaaogi"		Anand–Milind	Sameer
Eena Meena Deeka	495	"Saiyan Ke Saath Madhaiya"		Anand–Milind	Sameer
Ekka Raja Rani	542	"Ishq Karoge To Dard Milega"	Solo, Udit Narayan, Alka Yagnik	Nadeem-Shravan	Sameer
Ekka Raja Rani	543	"Pyar Karo To Aise"		Nadeem-Shravan	Sameer
Ekka Raja Rani	544	"Dil Ko Zara Sa Aaram Denge"		Nadeem-Shravan	Sameer
Elaan	479	"Naino Ko Baatein Karne Do"	Lata Mangeshkar, Poornima, Sadhana Sargam	Shyam-Surender	
Elaan	480	"Turu Ru Turu Ru"		Shyam-Surender	
Elaan	481	"Mil Ke Tumhari"		Shyam-Surender	
Elaan	482	"Subah Hui Sham Hui"		Shyam-Surender	
Elaan	483	"Laal Laal Gaal"		Shyam-Surender	
Fauj	600	"Teri Nazar Ne Humko"	Kavita Krishnamurthy, Solo	Raamlaxman	Dev Kohli
Fauj	601	"Tum Ko Choo Ke Kiya Hai"		Raamlaxman	Dev Kohli
Fauj	602	"Tarana Mere Dil Ka"		Raamlaxman	Dev Kohli
Gangster	584	"Aaye Re Aaye"	Asha Bhosle	Jatin–Lalit	M.G Hashmat
Ghar Ki Izzat	596	"Bewafa Bewafa Ho Tum"	Solo	Amar-Utpal	Anjaan
Gopalaa	628	"Aaj Akele Main"	Kavita Krishnamurti	Anu Malik	Rani Malik, Sameer, Dev Kohli
Gopalaa	629	"Pyar Banke Nasha"		Anu Malik	
Gopalaa	630	"Tumhari Kasam"		Anu Malik	
Gopi Kishan	529	"Yeh Ishq Hai Kya"	Alka Yagnik, Poornima	Anand Milind	Sameer
Gopi Kishan	530	"Hayy Hukku Hai Hai"		Anand Milind	Sameer
Gopi Kishan	531	"Chatri Na Khol Barsaat Mein"		Anand Milind	Sameer
Gopi Kishan	532	" I Love You"		Anand Milind	Sameer
Hanste Khelte	597	"O Yaara O Yaara"	Solo	Jatin–Lalit	Rani Malik
Hum Aapke Hain Koun	440	"Aaj Humare Dil Mein"	Lata Mangeshkar	Raam Laxman	Ravinder Rawal
Hum Hain Bemisaal	541	"Tujhse Kya Chori Hai"	Sadhana Sargam	Anu Malik	Qateel Shifai
Ikke Pe Ikka	616	"Sounga Na Sone Doonga"	Solo	Mahesh–Kishore	
Imtihaan	501	"Chaha To Bahut"	Solo, Bela Sulakhe, Alka Yagnik	Anu Malik	Faiz Anwar
Imtihaan	502	"Chhoodake Daman To"		Anu Malik	Faiz Anwar
Imtihaan	503	"Do Baaten Ho Sakti Hain"		Anu Malik	Faiz Anwar
Imtihaan	504	"Is Tarah Aashiqui Ka Asar"		Anu Malik	Faiz Anwar
Insaniyat	471	"Saathi Tera Pyar Pooja Hai"	Sadhana Sargam, Mohammad Aziz, Sapna Mukherjee	Rajesh Roshan	Anjaan
Insaniyat	472	"Haule Haule"		Rajesh Roshan	Anjaan
Ishq Mein Jeena Ishq Mein Marna	589	"Are Baba Ye Dil Kyon"	Sadhana Sargam, Solo	Shyam - Surender	Gauhar Kanpuri
Ishq Mein Jeena Ishq Mein Marna	590	"Kisi Se Mujhe Pyar Ho"		Shyam - Surender	Gauhar Kanpuri
Ishq Mein Jeena Ishq Mein Marna	591	"Milta Na Pyar Jo Tera"		Shyam - Surender	Gauhar Kanpuri
Ishq Mein Jeena Ishq Mein Marna	592	"Chehra Tumhara"		Shyam - Surender	Gauhar Kanpuri
Jai Kishen	545	"Surat Hai Meri Bholi"	Solo, Alka Yagnik, Poornima	Anand–Milind	Sameer
Jai Kishen	546	"Pyar Hua Hai"		Anand–Milind	Sameer
Jai Kishen	547	"Yaaro Kya Ladki Hai"		Anand–Milind	Sameer
Jai Kishen	548	"Tilda Banaspati"		Anand–Milind	Sameer
Janta Ki Adalat	534	"Tum Bhi Pagal Hum"	Alka Yagnik, Sadhana Sargam, Kavita Krishnamurthy	Bappi Lahiri	Maya Govind
Janta Ki Adalat	535	"Dil Mein Kuch Aur"		Bappi Lahiri	Maya Govind
Janta Ki Adalat	536	"Dil Dhadakne Ka Bahna"		Bappi Lahiri	Maya Govind
Juaari	566	"Chupa Le Aankhon Mein Bana Ke Kajal"	Sadhana Sargam	Bappi Lahiri	Anwar Sagar
Kabhi Haan Kabhi Naa	526	"Ae Kaash Ke Hum"	Alka Yagnik, Devaki Pandit, Solo	Jatin–Lalit	Majrooh Sultanpuri
Kabhi Haan Kabhi Naa	527	"Aana Mere Pyar Ko Na Tum"		Jatin–Lalit	Majrooh Sultanpuri
Kabhi Haan Kabhi Naa	528	"Woh To Hai Albela"		Jatin–Lalit	Majrooh Sultanpuri
Kanoon	567	"Tujhe Lift Car Mein"	Lata Mangeshkar	Raamlaxman	Maya Govind, Faiz Anwar, Rani Malik
Kanoon	568	"Jack And Jill Went"		Raamlaxman	
Kanoon	569	"Kya Khata Hai Meri"		Raamlaxman	
Kanoon	570	"Main Bani Hoon Sirf"		Raamlaxman	
Karan	631	"Aasman Pe Chand Nikla"	Sadhana Sargam, Alka Yagnik, Lata Mangeshkar	Raamlaxman	Dev Kohli, Faaiz Anwar
Karan	632	"Ek Idea Hai"		Raamlaxman	
Karan	633	"Kab Tak Pyar Chupaoge"		Raamlaxman	
Karan	634	"Mera Dil Tera Deewana"		Raamlaxman	
Karan	635	"Mera Peecha Chodne Ka"		Raamlaxman	
Khudai	577	"Kis Mausam Mein Ya Rab"	Solo	Jagjit Singh	Sudarshan Faakir
Khuddar	484	"Tumsa Koi Pyaara"	Alka Yagnik	Anu Malik	Zameer Kazmi, Rahat Indori, Dev Kohli
Khuddar	485	"Tum Mano Ya Na Mano"		Anu Malik	
Khuddar	486	"Woh Aankh Hi Kya"		Anu Malik	
Khuddar	487	"Tere Deewane Ne"		Anu Malik	
Kranti Kshetra	554	"Jaaneman Yeh Geet Nahin"	Solo	Nadeem-Shravan	Surinder
Krantiveer	443	"Jabse Hum Tere Aashiq Bane"	Alka Yagnik, Poornima	Anand–Milind	Sameer
Krantiveer	444	"Chunri Udi Sajan"		Anand–Milind	Sameer
Laqshya	578	"Tere Bina O Mere Sanam"	Alka Yagnik, Kavita Krishnamurthy	Jatin-Lalit	Majrooh Sultanpuri, Rani Malik, Madan Pal, Anwar Sagar
Laqshya	579	"Tum Humko Hum Tumko"		Jatin-Lalit	
Laqshya	580	Tumhare Paas Aane Se"		Jatin-Lalit	
Laqshya	581	"Yeh Dil Sanam Tumhare"		Jatin-Lalit	
Madhosh	588	"Beparwah Bohot Din"	Udit Narayan	Anand–Milind	Sameer
Main Khiladi Tu Anari	446	"Chura Ke Dil Mera"	Alka Yagnik	Anu Malik	Dev Kohli, Rani Malik
Main Khiladi Tu Anari	447	"Paas Woh Aane Lage Zaara Zaara"	Alka Yagnik	Anu Malik	
Main Khiladi Tu Anari	448	"Zuban Khamosh"		Anu Malik	
Main Khiladi Tu Anari	449	"Lakhon Haseen"	Asha Bhosle	Anu Malik	
Masti	626	"Ai Ji Oi Ji"	Mahendra Kapoor	Adesh Shrivastava	
Masti	627	"Houle Houle"		Adesh Shrivastava	
Mohra	441	"Ae Kaash Kahin Aisa Hota"	Solo	Viju Shah	Anand Bakshi, Indeewar
Mohra	442	"Dil Har Koi"	Alka Yagnik	Viju Shah	
Mr. Azaad	509	"Garmi Lage Garmi"	Alka Yagnik, Kavita Krishnamurthy, Sapna Awasthi, Solo	Bappi Lahiri	Indeevar
Mr. Azaad	510	"Diya Diya Dil Diya"		Bappi Lahiri	Indeevar
Mr. Azaad	511	"Gilli Bina Aise Danda"		Bappi Lahiri	Indeevar
Mr. Azaad	512	"Main Teri Chanchal Titli"		Bappi Lahiri	Indeevar
Mr. Azaad	513	"Tu Jhumta Hua Sawan"		Bappi Lahiri	Indeevar
Mr. Azaad	514	"Azaad Aaya Re"		Bappi Lahiri	Indeevar
Naaraaz	557	"Sambhala Hai Maine"	Solo, Udit Narayan	Anu Malik	Qateel Shifai, Faiz Anwar, Hasrat Jaipuri, Rahat Indori
Naaraaz	558	"Tumhe Hum Kya Samajhte"		Anu Malik	
Naaraaz	559	"Kitni Haseen Hai Raat"		Anu Malik	
Naaraaz	560	"Tere Bin Main Kuch Bhi Nahin"		Anu Malik	
Paramaatma	585	"Tune Mera Dil Chua Dil Chua"	Solo, Alka Yagnik	Bappi Lahiri	Indeevar
Paramaatma	586	"Swarg Mein Milegi"		Bappi Lahiri	Indeevar
Pathreela Raasta	593	"Aag Lagaake Chale Ho Kahan"	Alka Yagnik	Raamlaxman	Shaily Shailendra, Rani Malik, Maya Govind
Pathreela Raasta	594	"Main Hoon Tera Tu Hai Meri"		Raamlaxman	
Pathreela Raasta	595	"Kangna Pehna De Sajan"		Raamlaxman	
Pehla Pehla Pyar	564	"Maine Kahin Na"	Alka Yagnik, Poornima	Anand–Milind	Anand Bakshi
Pehla Pehla Pyar	565	"Sari Batein Hoti Hai"		Anand–Milind	Anand Bakshi
Prem Yog	615	"Ye Dil Mein Rehne Wale"	Solo & Anuradha Paudwal	Bappi Lahiri	
Prema Sikharam	582	"Dil Kho Chuke Hole Hole"	Alka Yagnik	Manoj Saran	
Prema Sikharam	583	"O Preeti"		Manoj Saran	
Pyar Ka Rog	576	"Ja Jake Kahan"	Alka Yagnik	Bappi Lahiri	Rani Malik
Raja Babu	445	"Sarkaiye Lo Khatiya"	Poornima	Anand–Milind	Sameer
Saajan Ka Ghar	489	"Apni Bhi Zindagi Mein"	Sadhana Sargam, Alka Yagnik	Nadeem-Shravan	Sameer
Saajan Ka Ghar	490	"Main Karti Hoon Tujhe Pyar"		Nadeem-Shravan	Sameer
Saajan Ka Ghar	491	"Nazar Jeedhar Jeedhar Jaye"		Nadeem-Shravan	Sameer
Saajan Ka Ghar	492	"Sawan Aaya Badal Chhaye"		Nadeem-Shravan	Sameer
Salaami	549	"Chehra Kya Dekhte Ho"	Alka Yagnik, Asha Bhosle, Kavita Krishnamurthy	Nadeem-Shravan	Sameer, Anwar Sagar
Salaami	550	"Mere Mehboob Ki Yahin Pehchan Hai"		Nadeem-Shravan	
Salaami	551	"Bas Ek Tamanna Hai"		Nadeem-Shravan	
Salaami	552	"Tumhein Chede Hawaa Chanchal"		Nadeem-Shravan	
Salaami	553	"Mile Tumse Bichadke Hum"		Nadeem-Shravan	
Stuntman	617	"Aaj Mile Ho Kal Phir"	Suhasini, Alka Yagnik	Nadeem-Shravan	Sameer
Stuntman	618	"Aati Hai Teri Yaad Aati Hain"		Nadeem-Shravan	Sameer
Stuntman	619	"Yeh Aankhen Hai Aaina"		Nadeem-Shravan	Sameer
Stuntman	620	"Yeh Maine Soch Liya"		Nadeem-Shravan	Sameer
Stuntman	621	"Zindagi Kya Hai Ek Nagma"		Nadeem-Shravan	Sameer
Suhaag	455	"Ye Nakhra Ladki Ka"	Udit Narayan, Alka Yagnik, Poornima	Anand Milind	Sameer
Teesra Kaun	537	"Love In Rain"	Poornima	Anand–Milind	Sameer
Udhaar Ki Zindagi	612	"Main Bhi Chup Hoon"	Alka Yagnik, Sadhana Sargam	Anand–Milind	Sameer
Udhaar Ki Zindagi	613	"Dil Dhadakne Ka Bahana"		Anand–Milind	Sameer
Udhaar Ki Zindagi	614	"Hum Ne To Le Hai Kasam"		Anand–Milind	Sameer
Vijaypath	463	"Raah Mein Unse Mulakat Ho Gayi"	Sadhana Sargam, Alka Yagnik	Anu Malik	Indeewar, Faaiz Anwar, Zameer Kazmi, Shaily Shailendra
Vijaypath	464	"Saagar Sang Kinare Ho"		Anu Malik	
Vijaypath	465	"Der Lagi Aane Mein Tumko"		Anu Malik	
Vijaypath	466	"Seene Mein Dil"		Anu Malik	
Yaar Gaddar	555	"Tum Hi Tum"	Alka Yagnik	Anu Malik	Pooja, Dev Kohli
Yaar Gaddar	556	"Mere Samne Hai"		Anu Malik	
Yeh Dillagi	473	"Honton Pe Bas"	Lata Mangeshkar	Dilip Sen-Sameer Sen	Sameer
Yeh Dillagi	474	"Naam Kya Hai"		Dilip Sen-Sameer Sen	Sameer
Yeh Dillagi	475	"Dekho Zara Dekho"		Dilip Sen-Sameer Sen	Sameer
Yuhi Kabhi	610	"Yunhi Kabhi Kuch Mil Gaya"	Solo	Nikhil Vinay	Yogesh
Yuhi Kabhi	611	"Yunhi Kabhi (Sad)"	Solo	Nikhil Vinay	Yogesh
Zaalim	533	"Mubarak Ho Mubarak Ho"	Solo, Alka Yagnik	Anu Malik	Zafar Gorakhpuri
Zakhmi Dil	538	"Ae Meri Zindagi"	Solo, Sadhna Sargam	Rishi Raj	Sameer
Zakhmi Dil	539	"Phool Jahan Khiltey Hain"		Rishi Raj	Sameer
Zakhmi Dil	540	"Khushiyon Ka Mausam"		Rishi Raj	Sameer
Zamane Se Kya Darna	488	"Aankhon Se Hum Batein"	Alka Yagnik	Anand–Milind	Sameer

=== 1995 ===
Film(s)	No.	Song name(s)	Co-Singer(s)	Music director(s)	Lyricist(s)
7 Days	788	"Bachke Kahan Jaayega"	Kavita Krishnamurti	Babul Bose	
7 Days	789	"Ek Din Bhi Aisa Nahin"		Babul Bose	
7 Days	790	"Ek Din Bhi Aisa Nahin (Sad)"		Babul Bose	
7 Days	791	"Jaanu Meri Jaanu"		Babul Bose	
7 Days	792	"Mujhe Tumse Koi Male"		Babul Bose	
7 Days	793	"Yaad Bahut Tum Aate Ho"		Babul Bose	
Aatank Hi Aatank	736	"O Meri Jane Jigar"	Solo	Bappi Lahiri	Anwar Sagar
Aazmayish	741	"Oh My Daddy"	Sonu Nigam	Anand–Milind	Anand Bakshi
Ab Insaf Hoga	778	"Yeh Behki Behki Chaal"	Alka Yagnik	Anand–Milind	Anand Bakshi
Ahankaar	723	"Oh Bamba Oh"	Sadhana Sargam	Anu Malik	Anand Bakshi
Akele Hum Akele Tum	653	"Dil Mera Churaya Kyun"	Alka Yagnik	Anu Malik	Majrooh Sultanpuri
Akele Hum Akele Tum	654	"Dil Kehta Hai"		Anu Malik	Majrooh Sultanpuri
Akele Hum Akele Tum	655	"Raja Ko Rani Se Pyaar"		Anu Malik	Majrooh Sultanpuri
Andolan	665	"Dil To Khoya Hai"	Udit Narayan, Alka Yagnik, Sapna Mukherjee	Nadeem-Shravan	Sameer
Andolan	666	"Aayegi Har Pal Tujhe"		Nadeem-Shravan	Sameer
Andolan	667	"Kitne Dino Ke Baad"		Nadeem-Shravan	Sameer
Andolan	668	"Nazar Mein Tu"		Nadeem-Shravan	Sameer
Andolan	669	"Mujhe To Hone Laga"		Nadeem-Shravan	Sameer
Andolan	670	"Dil Hamne Diya"		Nadeem-Shravan	Sameer
Angrakshak	672	"Dil Mera Churane Laga"	Alka Yagnik, Solo	Anand–Milind	Sameer
Angrakshak	673	"Dil Mera Udaas Hai (Male)"		Anand–Milind	Sameer
Anokha Andaaz	782	"Mahfil Mein Sitaron Ki"	Solo, Alka Yagnik	Nadeem-Shrvaan	
Anokha Andaaz	783	"Mausam Aashiqana Hai"		Nadeem-Shrvaan	
Anokha Andaaz	784	"Tu Deewana Paagal"		Nadeem-Shrvaan	
Barsaat	639	"Humko Sirf Tumse Pyar Hai"	Alka Yagnik, Sadhana Sargam	Nadeem-Shravan	Sameer
Barsaat	640	"Love Tujhe Love"		Nadeem-Shravan	Sameer
Barsaat	641	"Nahin Ye Ho Nahin Sakta"		Nadeem-Shravan	Sameer
Barsaat	642	"Dil Pagal Deewana Hai"		Nadeem-Shravan	Sameer
Barsaat	643	"Humko Padhaai Se"		Nadeem-Shravan	Sameer
Coolie No. 1	644	"Coolie No. 1"	Alka Yagnik, Sadhana Sargam, Poornima	Anand-Milind	Sameer
Coolie No. 1	645	"Aa Jaana Aa Jaana"		Anand-Milind	Sameer
Coolie No. 1	646	"Mai To Raste Se Jaa Raha Tha"		Anand-Milind	Sameer
Coolie No. 1	647	"Jeth Ki Dopahri Mein"		Anand-Milind	Sameer
Coolie No. 1	648	"Kya Majnu Kya Ranjha"		Anand-Milind	Sameer
Criminal	719	"Tu Mile Dil Khile"	Alka Yagnik, Chitra, Alisha Chinai, Solo	M. M. Kreem	Indeevar
Criminal	720	"Janu Janu Janu"		M. M. Kreem	Indeevar
Criminal	721	"Mujhko Chhupa Le"		M. M. Kreem	Indeevar
Criminal	722	"Tu Mile Dil Khile (Male)"		M. M. Kreem	Indeevar
Dilwale Dulhania Le Jayenge	635	"Tujhe Dekha Toh"	Lata Mangeshkar	Jatin–Lalit	Anand Bakshi
Diya Aur Toofan	740	"Dhoom Tara Tara Dhoom Tara Tara"	Kavita Krishnamurthy	Bappi Lahiri	Maya Govind
Dushmani: A Violent Love Story	780	"Mera Salaam Le"	Udit Narayan, Kavita Krishnamurthy, Suresh Wadkar, Alka Yagnik	Anand–Milind	Sameer
Dushmani: A Violent Love Story	781	"Ladki Kunwari Thi"		Anand–Milind	Sameer
Fauji	779	"Tere Bina Nahin Hai Guzaa"	Solo	Vishal Bhardwaj	Ibrahim Ashq
Gaddaar	727	"Aaj Kal Ki Nahin"	Alka Yagnik, Sadhana Sargam, Udit Narayan, Bali Brahmbhatt, Sapna Mukherjee, Sonu Nigam	Nadeem-Shravan	Sameer
Gaddaar	728	"Mohabbat Woh Karega"		Nadeem-Shravan	Sameer
Gaddaar	729	"Sun To Zara"		Nadeem-Shravan	Sameer
Gaddaar	730	"Tumse Milne Ko"		Nadeem-Shravan	Sameer
Gambler	656	"Hum Unse Mohabbat Kar Ke"	Alka Yagnik	Anu Malik	Nawab Arzoo, Dev Kohli
Gambler	657	"Yaar Daakiye Mere Kabootar"		Anu Malik	
Ghar Ka Kanoon	799	"Dekho Zara Dekho"	Alka Yagnik	Swapan Jagmohan	
Ghar Ka Kanoon	800	"Payel Bole Re"		Swapan Jagmohan	
God and Gun	738	"Tu Meri Ibtida Hai"	Solo, Sadhana Sargam	Anand–Milind	Sameer
God and Gun	739	"Aaya Tha Dhondne Nokri"		Anand–Milind	Sameer
Guddu	732	"Hum Dono Panchhi"	Sadhana Sargam, Devki Pandit	Naushad	Majrooh Sultanpuri
Guddu	733	"Daddy Se Poochh Lena"		Naushad	Majrooh Sultanpuri
Guddu	734	"Dil Hai Pyare"		Naushad	Majrooh Sultanpuri
Guddu	735	"Pyar Mera Zindagi"		Naushad	Majrooh Sultanpuri
Gunda Mawali	804	"Raju Awara"	Alka Yagnik	Jatin–Lalit	
Gunda Mawali	805	"Tera Naam Pasand Hai"	Poornima	Jatin–Lalit	
Gunda Mawali	806	"Yeh Zindagi Ka Usool Hai"	Solo	Jatin–Lalit	
Gundaraj	687	"Ek Nigah Mein"	Alisha Chinai, Alka Yagnik, Sadhana Sargam	Anu Malik	Zafar Gorakhpuri, Zameer Kazmi, Rahat Indori
Gundaraj	688	"I Love You"		Anu Malik	
Gundaraj	689	"Mujhe Tum Se"		Anu Malik	
Gundaraj	690	"Cham Ke Dhup"		Anu Malik	
Gundaraj	691	"Dhadke Dhadke Mera"		Anu Malik	
Gunehgar	767	"Wada Karo Yeh"	Alka Yagnik, Sadhna Sargam	Shyam-Surender	Maan Singh Deep, Seema Janam
Gunehgar	768	"Dil Huwa Beqarar"		Shyam-Surender	
Gunehgar	769	"Keh Do Na Ki Tumse Pyar Hai"		Shyam-Surender	
Haqeeqat	658	"Mele Lage Hue Hain"	Alka Yagnik	Dilip Sen-Sameer Sen	Gulshan Bawra, Rani Malik
Haqeeqat	659	"O Jane Jaan"		Dilip Sen-Sameer Sen	
Haqeeqat	660	"Le Pappiyan Jhappiyan"		Dilip Sen-Sameer Sen	
Haqeeqat	661	"Main Tere Dil Mein"		Dilip Sen-Sameer Sen	
Hulchul	671	"Pehli Dafaa Is Dil Mein"	Alka Yagnik	Anu Malik	Faiz Anwar
Hum Dono	662	"Pyar Ki Gaadi"	Udit Narayan, Sadhana Sargam, Poornima	Anand–Milind	Sameer
Hum Dono	663	Aao Milke Ise Chalayein"		Anand–Milind	Sameer
Hum Dono	664	"Ek Ladki Hai Deewani Si"		Anand–Milind	Sameer
Hum Sab Chor Hain	751	"Saawli Saloni Teri"	Alka Yagnik, Ila Arun, Kavita Krishnamurthy	Bappi Lahiri	Nawab Arzoo
Hum Sab Chor Hain	752	"Tota Se Lad Gaye"		Bappi Lahiri	Nawab Arzoo
Jai Vikraanta	698	"Pyar Ikrar Mere Yaar"	Alka Yagnik	Anand–Milind	Sameer
Janam Kundli	757	"Agar Barsaat Na Hoti"	Poornima	Anand–Milind	Sameer
Jawab	763	"Kal Hum Jahan Mile The"	Solo, Sadhana Sargam	Anu Malik	Gulshan Bawra, Hasrat Jaipuri
Jawab	764	"Tum Pe Dil Aa Gaya"		Anu Malik	
Jawab	765	"Ye Dil Mein Rahanewale"		Anu Malik	
Kalyug Ke Avtaar	774	"Do Pyar Karne Walo Ko"	Kavita Krishnamurthy	Ravindra Jain	Ravindra Jain
Karan Arjun	636	"Yeh Bandhan"	Udit Narayan, Alka Yagnik	Rajesh Roshan	Indeewar
Karan Arjun	637	"Jaati Hoon Main"		Rajesh Roshan	Indeewar
Karan Arjun	638	"Jai Maa Kali"		Rajesh Roshan	Indeewar
Kartavya	713	"Yeh Dil Ki Dhadkan Kya Kehti Hai"	Alka Yagnik	Dilip Sen-Sameer Sen	Sameer
Kartavya	714	"Pyar Mein Dil Ka Murga"		Dilip Sen-Sameer Sen	Sameer
Kartavya	715	"Hamen Kya Khabar Thi"		Dilip Sen-Sameer Sen	Sameer
Kartavya	716	"Dhadakta Tha Pehle Dil Mera"		Dilip Sen-Sameer Sen	Sameer
Kismat	731	"Yeh Kya Mujko Hone Laga"	Alka Yagnik	Anand–Milind	Sameer
Maidan-E-Jung	699	"Kya Baat Hai Tu Saath Hai"	Alka Yagnik, Sapna Mukherjee	Bappi Lahiri	K.K Verma, Maya Govind
Maidan-E-Jung	700	"Sham Dhal Rahi Hai"		Bappi Lahiri	
Meri Mohabbat Mera Naseeba	785	"Hum To Hai Pagal Premee"	Alka Yagnik, Kavita Krishnamurti, Sadhana Sargam	Anand-Milind	
Meri Mohabbat Mera Naseeba	786	"Main Bewafa Nahin Hoon"		Anand-Milind	
Meri Mohabbat Mera Naseeba	787	"Sabse Badi Daulat Hai Hamari"		Anand-Milind	
Milan	749	"Ek Baat Bataon"	Sadhana Sargam	Anand–Milind	Sameer
Milan	750	"Ladki Jo Aaye Bazaar Mein"		Anand–Milind	Sameer
Naajayaz	674	"Lal Lal Hoton Pe"	Roop Kumar Rathod, Alka Yagnik	Anu Malik	Indeevar
Naajayaz	675	"Kya Tum Mujhse Pyar Karte Ho"		Anu Malik	Indeevar
Naajayaz	676	"Barsaat Ke Mausam Mein"		Anu Malik	Indeevar
Naajayaz	677	"Ek Kadam Tera Ek Kadam Mera"		Anu Malik	Indeevar
Nazar Ke Samne	758	"Dil Dhadke Kuchh Kah Nahin"	Sadhna Sargam	Mahesh–Kishore	
Nazar Ke Samne	759	"Dheere Dheere Baat Badi"		Mahesh–Kishore	
Nishana	742	"Samane Baithi Raho"	Alka Yagnik	Jatin–Lalit	
Nishana	743	"Pyar Hi Pyar Hai"		Jatin–Lalit	
Paandav	744	"Tere Liye Rehta Hai"	Alka Yagnik, Kavita Krishnamurthy, Devki Pandit	Jatin–Lalit	Vinod Mahendra, Shyam Raj, Mahendra Dehlvi
Paandav	745	"Aaj Main Ye Izhaar Karoon"		Jatin–Lalit	
Paandav	746	"Kasam Hai Pyar Ki Tumhe"		Jatin–Lalit	
Param Vir Chakra	753	"Sun Aaj Mere"	Solo, Sadhna Sargam, Suresh Wadkar, Mohammed Aziz, Asha Bhosle	Ravindra Jain	Ravindra Jain
Param Vir Chakra	754	"Ek Baat Kahoon"		Ravindra Jain	Ravindra Jain
Param Vir Chakra	755	"My First Love"		Ravindra Jain	Ravindra Jain
Param Vir Chakra	756	"Mere Mehboob Mere Watan"		Ravindra Jain	Ravindra Jain
Policewala Gunda	708	"Aata Batta"	Reena Roy, Aroon Bakshi, Ila Arun, Lata Mangeshkar	Bappi Lahiri	Maya Govind
Policewala Gunda	709	"Ishq Kare Deewana Dil Ko"		Bappi Lahiri	Maya Govind
Policewala Gunda	710	"Dekha Maine Ek Sapna"		Bappi Lahiri	Maya Govind
Pyaar Karne Wale Kabhi Kam Na Honge	794	"Ek Do Teen Chaar"	Anuradha Paudwal	Lata Kalyan	
Raghuveer	711	"Love Interview"	Poornima	Dilip Sen-Sameer Sen	Sameer
Raghuveer	712	"Dil Tera Deewana"		Dilip Sen-Sameer Sen	Sameer
Ram Shastra	726	"O Main Tera Tum Mere"	Alka Yagnik	Anu Malik, Aadesh Shrivastava	Dev Kohli
Ravan Raaj	678	"Aaina Aaina Dil Ko"	Sadhana Sargam, Jayshree Shivram	Viju Shah	Anand Bakshi
Ravan Raaj	679	"O Sanam O Sanam"		Viju Shah	Anand Bakshi
Rock Dancer	772	"Liya Liya Re"	Usha Uthup, Sharon Prabhakar	Bappi Lahiri	
Rock Dancer	773	"One Two Cha Cha Cha"		Bappi Lahiri	
Saajan Ki Baahon Mein	680	"Koi Kya Pehchane"	Solo, Asha Bhosle, Sadhana Sargam	Nadeem-Shravan	Sameer
Saajan Ki Baahon Mein	681	"Kitna Sukun Kitna Aaram"		Nadeem-Shravan	Sameer
Saajan Ki Baahon Mein	682	"Pilaya Hai"		Nadeem-Shravan	Sameer
Saajan Ki Baahon Mein	683	"Aap Ke Karieb Hum Rehte"		Nadeem-Shravan	Sameer
Saajan Ki Baahon Mein	684	"Purab Se Chali"		Nadeem-Shravan	Sameer
Saajan Ki Baahon Mein	685	"Saachi Kaho Hum Se"		Nadeem-Shravan	Sameer
Saajan Ki Baahon Mein	686	"Saachi Kaho Hum Se (Sad)"		Nadeem-Shravan	Sameer
Sabse Bada Khiladi	649	"Bholi Bhali Ladki"	Alka Yagnik	Rajesh Roshan	Dev Kohli
Sabse Bada Khiladi	650	"Zahar Hai Ke Pyar Hai"		Rajesh Roshan	Dev Kohli
Sabse Bada Khiladi	651	"Mukala Muqabla Hoga"		Rajesh Roshan	Dev Kohli
Sabse Bada Khiladi	652	"Sabse Bada Khiladi"		Rajesh Roshan	Dev Kohli
Sanjay	770	"Hum Aur Tum"	Kavita Krishnamurthy	Shyam - Surender	Anwar Sagar, Faaiz Anwar
Sanjay	771	"Tum Ko Hain Kasam"		Shyam - Surender	
Sarhad: The Border of Crime	775	"Aapko Dekh Kar Chha Gaya Kya Suroor"	Alka Yagnik, Sadhana Sargam, Solo	Sukhwinder Singh	Sameer
Sarhad: The Border of Crime	776	"Suno Yaar Mere"		Sukhwinder Singh	Sameer
Sarhad: The Border of Crime	777	"Suno Yaar Mere (Male)"		Sukhwinder Singh	Sameer
Sauda	766	"Deewana Toh Kah Diya"	Solo	Aadesh Shrivastava	Anwar Sagar
Surakshaa	705	"Dil Mein Ho Pyar"	Solo, Alka Yagnik	Anu Malik	Faiz Anwar
Surakshaa	706	"Kaali Aankhon Wali"		Anu Malik	Faiz Anwar
Surakshaa	707	"Masoom Sanam"		Anu Malik	Faiz Anwar
Taaqat	760	"Patthar Pe Likhi Koi"	Sadhana Sargam, Alka Yagnik, Poornima	Anand–Milind	Sameer
Taaqat	761	"Hun Huna Re Hun Huna"		Anand–Milind	Sameer
Taaqat	762	"Kaisee Hai Dil Ki Lagi"		Anand–Milind	Sameer
Takkar	701	"Dil Gaya Haanthon Se"	Solo, Alka Yagnik	Anu Malik	Rani Malik, Maya Govind, Nawab Arzoo
Takkar	702	"Palkein Ho Khuli Ya Bandh"		Anu Malik	
Takkar	703	"Aankhon Mein Basaya Tha"		Anu Malik	
Takkar	704	"Teri Aankhon Ne Aisa Kamaal Ki"		Anu Malik	
Taqdeerwala	717	"Phool Jaisi Muskaan"	Alka Yagnik, Sadhana Sargam	Anand–Milind	Sameer
Taqdeerwala	718	"Aey Chhori Tu Tapori"		Anand–Milind	Sameer
Teenmoti	795	"Ishq Pe Koi Zor"	Alka Yagnik, Poornima, Sadhana Sargam	Dilip Sen-Sameer Sen	
Teenmoti	796	"Yaar Dil Se"		Dilip Sen-Sameer Sen	
Teenmoti	797	"Dil Tera Deewana Hai"		Dilip Sen-Sameer Sen	
Teenmoti	798	"Tumko Janaam"		Dilip Sen-Sameer Sen	
The Don	724	"Dekha Jo Tumhe Dil"	Sadhana Sargam, Solo	Dilip Sen - Sameer Sen	Deepak Chaudhary, Anwar Sagar
The Don	725	"Teri Chaahat Mein Dil"		Dilip Sen - Sameer Sen	
Vartmaan	801	"Ab Main Hosh Me Aaya To"	Asha Bhosle	Ram Laxman	
Vartmaan	802	"Kabhi Tum Sanam Ho Kabhi"		Ram Laxman	
Vartmaan	803	"Tu Jo Mera Yaar Bane Rumba"		Ram Laxman	
Veer	747	"Dhoom Dhadaka"	Poornima, Alka Yagnik	Dilip Sen - Sameer Sen	Poonam, Maya Govind
Veer	748	"Tere Hain Hum"		Dilip Sen - Sameer Sen	
Veergati	692	"Mausam Ne Badal Se"	Bela Sulakhe, Poornima, Sadhana Sargam	Aadesh Shrivastava	Indeewar
Veergati	693	"Meri Nigah Main"		Aadesh Shrivastava	Indeewar
Veergati	694	"Khud Se Har Koi Rootha Hai"		Aadesh Shrivastava	Indeewar
Zakhmi Sipahi	737	"Tum Sharma Ke Dekho"	Sadhana Sargam	Rais Bhartiya	
Zamaana Deewana	695	"Neend Kise Chain Kahan"	Alka Yagnik	Nadeem-Shravan	Sameer
Zamaana Deewana	696	"For Ever 'N' Ever"		Nadeem-Shravan	Sameer
Zamaana Deewana	697	"For Ever 'N' Ever (Sad)"		Nadeem-Shravan	Sameer

=== 1996 ===
Film(s)	No.	Song name(s)	Co-Singer(s)	Music director(s)	Lyricist(s)
Agni Sakshi	810	"Tu Meri Gulfam Hai"	Kavita Krishnamurthy	Nadeem-Shravan	Sameer
Ajay	819	"Chamak Chhallo"	Jolly Mukherjee, Alka Yagnik, Sapna Awasthi	Anand–Milind	
Ajay	820	"Chaand Sa Chehra"		Anand–Milind	
Ajay	821	"Daata Mere Daata"		Anand–Milind	
Ajay	822	"Deewana Hua Main"		Anand–Milind	
Ajay	823	"Ruk Majnu"		Anand–Milind	
Ajay	824	"Banna Ghodi Pe"		Anand–Milind	
Ajay	825	"Chanchal Churiyan"		Anand–Milind	
Angaara	881	"Aaja Gori Banki Chhori"	Solo, Kavita Krishnamurthy	Dilip Sen-Sameer Sen	
Angaara	882	"Jeevan Hai Sangram Bande"		Dilip Sen-Sameer Sen	
Apne Dam Par	911	"Tum Jo Rahoge Bas Khwaab Banke"	Vijayta Pandit	Aadesh Shrivastava	Shyam Raj
Army	842	"Dil Mein Kuch Hone Laga"	Sadhana Sargam	Anand–Milind	Sameer
Bambai Ka Babu	887	"Chori Chori Iqrar"	Udit Narayan, Sadhna Sargam, Alka Yagnik	Anand–Milind	Sameer
Bambai Ka Babu	888	"Ham Nikal Pade"		Anand–Milind	
Bambai Ka Babu	889	"Honge Kabhi Ab Na Juda"		Anand–Milind	
Bambai Ka Babu	890	"Sapne Hain Yaadein Hain"		Anand–Milind	
Bambai Ka Babu	891	"Mere Ghar Ka Pata"		Anand–Milind	
Bandish	878	"Aa Tujhe Main Pyar Dun"	Alka Yagnik, Poornima	Anand–Milind	Sameer
Bandish	879	"Maine Aapna Dil De Diya"		Anand–Milind	Sameer
Bandish	880	"Bole Mera Kangna"		Anand–Milind	Sameer
Bhishma	870	"Tere Bina Duniya"	Solo	Dilip Sen-Sameer Sen	
Chaahat	837	"Dil Ki Tanhai Ko"	Sadhana Sargam, Solo	Anu Malik	Nida Fazli
Chaahat	838	"Kabhi Dil Se Kam Mohabbat"		Anu Malik	Nida Fazli
Chhota Sa Ghar	907	"Tu Jhuth Bolta Hai"	Sadhana Sargam	Rajesh Roshan	
Chhota Sa Ghar	908	"Sorry Sorry Galati Ho Gayi"		Rajesh Roshan	
Chhota Sa Ghar	909	"Allah Jane"		Rajesh Roshan	
Chhote Sarkar	859	"Ek Naya Aasman"	Alka Yagnik	Anand–Milind	Rani Malik
Daanveer	876	"Kaun Hai Jo Mere"	Alka Yagnik	Anand-Milind	
Daanveer	877	"Rimjhim Rimjhim"		Anand-Milind	
Daraar	843	"Aisi Mili Nigahen"	Alka Yagnik	Anu Malik	Rani Malik
Daraar	844	"Tera Chand Chehra"		Anu Malik	Rani Malik
Daraar	845	"Tuhe Meri Manzil"		Anu Malik	Rani Malik
Dastak	873	"Sheeshe Se"	Solo, Alka Yagnik	Rajesh Roshan	Javed Akhtar
Dastak	874	"Pal Beet Gaya"		Rajesh Roshan	Javed Akhtar
Dil Tera Diwana	862	"Ban Ke Mohabbat Tum To Base Ho"	Alka Yagnik	Aadesh Shrivastava	Shyam Raj
Dil Tera Diwana	863	"Dil Pe Lahu Se Likh Diya"		Aadesh Shrivastava	Shyam Raj
Diljale	826	"Mera Mulk Mera Desh"	Solo, Alka Yagnik, Aditya Narayan	Anu Malik	Javed Akhtar
Diljale	827	"Ek Baat Main Apne Dil"		Anu Malik	Javed Akhtar
Diljale	828	"Jis Ke Aane Se"		Anu Malik	Javed Akhtar
Diljale	829	"Mera Mulk Mera Desh (Sad)"		Anu Malik	Javed Akhtar
Dushman Duniya Ka	904	"Mere Samne Gudiya Japani Hai"	Solo, Alka Yagnik	Anu Malik	Ravindra Jain
Dushman Duniya Ka	905	"Tanha Dil Sulagta Tha"		Anu Malik	Ravindra Jain
Dushman Duniya Ka	906	"Tumko Rulata Hi Raha"		Anu Malik	Ravindra Jain
Ek Tha Raja	875	"Halka Halka Chhaya"	Sadhna Sargam	Anand–Milind	Sameer
English Babu Desi Mem	858	"Deewana Main Tera Deewana"	Alka Yagnik	Nikhil-Vinay	Rani Malik
Fareb	860	"Aankhon Se Dil Mein Uttar Ke"	Alka Yagnik	Jatin–Lalit	Neeraj
Fareb	861	"Pyar Ka Pehla Pehla"		Jatin–Lalit	Neeraj
Hahakaar	910	"Gore Gore Gaal"	Alka Yagnik	Bappi Lahiri	Sameer
Himmat	854	"Saathiya Bin Tere Dil"	Alka Yagnik	Anand–Milind	Sameer
Himmat	855	"Mujhe Tujse Kuch"		Anand–Milind	Sameer
Himmat	856	"Kuku Kuku Kuku Kuru"		Anand–Milind	Sameer
Himmatvar	899	"Aapke Samne"	Alka Yagnik	Nadeem-Shravan	Anwar Sagar
Hukamnama	933	"Buddha Ghar Mein Hain"	Kavita Krishnamurthy	Iqbal Qureshi	
Hum Hai Premi	928	"Chehra Kahe Dil Ki"	Alka Yagnik, Ila Arun	Shyam Sunder	
Hum Hai Premi	929	"Sarkaile Khatia"		Shyam Sunder	
Hum Hai Premi	930	"Tere Pyar Mein Mera Naam"		Shyam Sunder	
Hum Hai Premi	931	"Tere Pyar Mein Paagal"		Shyam Sunder	
Hum Hai Premi	932	"Yeh Vaada Kiya Hum Ne"		Shyam Sunder	
Hum Hain Khalnayak	898	"Nazrien Milake Tune"	Chandrani Mukherjee	Bappi Lahiri	Nawaab Arzoo
Jagannath	924	"Aa Jana Raat Ko"	Poornima, Sadhna Sargam, Arpita Raaj	Arpita Raaj	
Jagannath	925	"Dil Ki Kalam Se"		Arpita Raaj	
Jagannath	926	"Dhak Dhina Dhin"		Arpita Raaj	
Jagannath	927	"My Dream Girl"		Arpita Raaj	
Jeet	811	"Tu Dharti Pe Chahe"	Alka Yagnik, Sadhana Sargam	Nadeem-Shravan	Sameer
Jeet	812	"Waadon Se Nahin"		Nadeem-Shravan	Sameer
Khamoshi: The Musical	831	"Aaj Main Uppar Aasmaan Niche"	Kavita Krishnamurthy, Solo	Jatin–Lalit	Majrooh Sultanpuri
Khamoshi: The Musical	832	"Aankhon Mein Kya"		Jatin–Lalit	Majrooh Sultanpuri
Khiladiyon Ka Khiladi	813	"Tu Kaun Hai Tera Naam Kya"	Sadhana Sargam	Anu Malik	Indeevar, Dev Kohli
Khiladiyon Ka Khiladi	814	"Tu Waaqif Nahi Meri Deewangi Se"		Anu Malik	
Khilona	919	"Lag Jao Gale"	Alka Yagnik	Naresh Sharma	
Krishna	830	"Koi Kaise Mohabbat"	Sadhana Sargam	Anu Malik	Anand Raj Anand
Laalchee	917	"Ooperwaale Neeli Chatri"	Solo, Sushma Shreshta	Dilip Sen-Sameer Sen	Sameer
Laalchee	918	"Teri Meri Zindagi"		Dilip Sen-Sameer Sen	Sameer
Maahir	912	"Main Tere Dil Ka Maa"	Solo, Alka Yagnik	Bappi Lahiri	Prayag Raj, Sikandar Bharti
Maahir	913	"Vaada Karke Jaate Ho"		Bappi Lahiri	
Mafia	867	"Yeh Dil Yeh Pagal Dil"	Alka Yagnik, Poornima	Anand–Milind	Sameer
Mafia	868	"Duniya Nazaare Na"		Anand–Milind	Sameer
Mafia	869	"Dil Mera Deewana Dhadke"		Anand–Milind	Sameer
Majhdhaar	892	"Aye Mere Dost Dosti Ki Kasam"	S.P. Balasubrahmanyam, Udit Narayan	Nadeem-Shravan	Sameer
Majhdhaar	893	"Kya Zamana Aa Gaya"		Nadeem-Shravan	Sameer
Majhdhaar	894	"Aye Mere Dost Dosti Ki Kasam (Part 2)"		Nadeem-Shravan	Sameer
Masoom	852	"Tukur Tukur Dekhate Ho Kya"	Poornima	Anand Raj Anand	Anand Raj Anand
Megha	902	"Button Daba Denge"	Kavita Krishnamurthy, Poornima	Ram-Laxman	
Megha	903	"Dildar Jab Tak Na Mile"		Ram-Laxman	
Mr. Bechara	864	"Saathi Mere Sun To Zara"	Alka Yagnik	Anand–Milind	Sameer
Mr. Bechara	865	"Jaanam Meri Jaanam"		Anand–Milind	Sameer
Muqadar	857	"Dil Hai Tera Jaan Hai Meri"	Alka Yagnik	Anand–Milind	Sameer
Nazarr	923	"Yeh Chand Kahin"	Alka Yagnik	Dilip Sen Sameer Sen	
Papa Kehte Hai	834	"Pyar Mein Hota"	Alka Yagnik, Kavita Krishnamurthy	Rajesh Roshan	Javed Akhtar
Papa Kehte Hai	835	"Yeh Jo Thodese Hai Paise"		Rajesh Roshan	Javed Akhtar
Papa Kehte Hai	836	"Ha Ha Hum Dulhan Walein"		Rajesh Roshan	Javed Akhtar
Papi Gudia	914	"Mujhe Tujh Se Kitna Pyar"	Alka Yagnik	Naresh Sharma	Sameer
Raja Hindustani	807	"Pardesi Pardesi"	Alka Yagnik, Alisha Chinai, Sapna Mukherjee	Nadeem-Shravan	Sameer
Raja Hindustani	808	"Poocho Zara Poocho"		Nadeem-Shravan	Sameer
Raja Hindustani	809	"Tere Ishq Mein Nachenge"		Nadeem-Shravan	Sameer
Raja Ki Aayegi Baraat	866	"Aankhe Ladi Tumse"	Asha Bhosle	Aadesh Shrivastava	Dev Kohli
Rakshak	841	"Kuchi Kuchi"	Alka Yagnik	Anand–Milind	Sameer
Ram Aur Shyam	895	"Pyar Kis Se Karen"	Solo, Alka Yagnik	Anu Malik	Faaiz Anwar
Ram Aur Shyam	896	"Ek Nazar Dekha Tujhe"		Anu Malik	Faaiz Anwar
Ram Aur Shyam	897	"Ajab Ho Tum"		Anu Malik	Faaiz Anwar
Rangbaaz	883	"Sawan Ki Raat Suhani"	Poornima	Bappi Lahiri	
Return of Jewel Thief	871	"Aaj Ka Din"	Abhijeet, Mohammed Aziz, Bali Brahmbhatt, Alka Yagnik & Vijeta Pandit	Jatin–Lalit	Anand Bakshi
Return of Jewel Thief	872	"Jug Magati Hai"		Jatin–Lalit	Anand Bakshi
Saajan Chale Sasural	815	"Dil Jaan Jigar Tujh Pe Nisaar"	Alka Yagnik	Nadeem-Shravan	Sameer, Arif Khan
Saajan Chale Sasural	816	"Tum Toh Dhokebaaj Ho"		Nadeem-Shravan	
Saajan Chale Sasural	817	"Bye Bye Miss Goodnight"		Nadeem-Shravan	
Saajan Chale Sasural	818	"Chahat Se Hai Begani"		Nadeem-Shravan	
Sapoot	839	"Tera Yeh Dekh Ke Chehra"	Solo, Sadhana Sargam	Anu Malik	Dev Kohli
Sapoot	840	"Kajal Kajal"		Anu Malik	Dev Kohli
Shastra	853	"Wade Na Ho Kasme Na Ho"	Vijeta Pandit	Aadesh Shrivastava	Shyam Raj
Shohrat	921	"Aaj Kal Lagta Nahin Dil"	Sadhana Sargam	Nikhil-Vinay	
Shohrat	922	"Gairon Se Baat Kar Ke"		Nikhil-Vinay	
Smuggler	915	"Aaj Raat Chhod Ke"	Alka Yagnik	Bappi Lahiri	Nawab Arzoo, Maya Govind
Smuggler	916	"Ye Barish Ka Paani"		Bappi Lahiri	
Talaashi	920	"Zindagi Ka Tu Naya Paigam Le"	Solo	Anand-Milind	
Tere Mere Sapne	833	"Aankh Marey"	Kavita Krishnamurthy	Viju Shah	Anand Bakshi
Tu Chor Main Sipahi	846	"Hum Do Premee"	Alka Yagnik, Poornima Shrestha	Dilip Sen Sameer Sen ||	
Tu Chor Main Sipahi	847	"Chal Kar Le Thoda Pyar"		Dilip Sen Sameer Sen ||	
Tu Chor Main Sipahi	848	"Bol O Gori"		Dilip Sen Sameer Sen ||	
Tu Chor Main Sipahi	849	"Tak Dhina Tak Dhina"		Dilip Sen Sameer Sen ||	
Tu Chor Main Sipahi	850	"Jaaneman Jaane Jaan"		Dilip Sen Sameer Sen ||	
Tu Chor Main Sipahi	851	"Kuch Ho Gaya"		Dilip Sen Sameer Sen ||	
Vishwasghaat	884	"Ye Dil Kyon Dhadakta Hai"	Lata Mangeshkar	Shyam-Surendar	Rani Malik
Vishwasghaat	885	"Deewangi Ye Jo Hai Pyar K"		Shyam-Surendar	Rani Malik
Vishwasghaat	886	"Janeman Janeja Dil Ne Di"		Shyam-Surendar	Rani Malik
Yash	900	"Akela Tu Hi Nahi"	Solo, Alisha Chinai	Tabun Sutradhar	
Yash	901	"Yeh Kya Hua"		Tabun Sutradhar	

=== 1997 ===
Film(s)	No.	Song name(s)	Co-Singer(s)	Music director(s)	Lyricist(s)
Aar Ya Paar	966	"Suna Hai Phool Khaliyon Se"	Kavita Krishnamurthy	Viju Shah	Rani Malik
Agnee Morcha	1017	"Tu Mere Pyar Ka"	Kavita Krishnamurthi	Shyam - Surender	
Agnichakra	1018	"Dil Dene Se Pehle Dobara Sochna"	Alka Yagnik	Bappi Lahiri	Amit Khanna
Ankhon Mein Tum Ho	1019	"Aankhon Mein Tum Ho"	Solo, Alka Yagnik, Anuradha Paudwal	Anu Malik	Anand Bakshi
Ankhon Mein Tum Ho	1020	"Hum Kahe Na Kahe"		Anu Malik	Anand Bakshi
Ankhon Mein Tum Ho	1021	"Maine Sawan Se Kaha"		Anu Malik	Anand Bakshi
Auzaar	960	"Tujhe Khas Fursat Mein"	Chandna Dixit, Udit Narayan, Alka Yagnik	Anu Malik	Indeevar
Auzaar	961	"Thahra Hai Yeh Sama"		Anu Malik	Indeevar
Auzaar	962	"Dil Ke Sau Tukde"		Anu Malik	Indeevar
Banarasi Babu	1038	"Meri Gori Gori Bahein"	Alka Yagnik	Anand–Milind	Sameer
Betaabi	976	"Gungunati Hui Ek Nadi Mil Gayi"	Suresh Wadkar	Vishal Bhardwaj	Sameer
Bhai Bhai	990	"Aankhen Jiski Mandir Masjid"	Udit Narayan, Alka Yagnik, Sapna Mukherjee, Sudesh Bhosle, Solo	Aadesh Shrivastava	Indeevar, Dev Kohli
Bhai Bhai	991	"Chaand Nikla"		Aadesh Shrivastava	
Bhai Bhai	992	"Chicklam Chicki"		Aadesh Shrivastava	
Bhai Bhai	993	"Dil Dil Dil"		Aadesh Shrivastava	
Chirag	994	"O Mehbooba Dekho"	Alka Yagnik	Rajesh Roshan	Anand Bakshi
Chirag	995	"Ghar Ka Chirag"	Udit Narayan	Rajesh Roshan	
Daadagiri	981	"Mujhe Yaara Tere Pyar Ne"	Kavita Krishnamurthy	Dilip Sen-Sameer Sen	Nawab Arzoo
Daava	968	"Dil Mein Hai Tu"	Poornima, Kavita Krishnamurthy, Abhijeet, Vijayeta Pandit	Jatin–Lalit	Malik, Israr Ansari
Daava	969	"Ru Tu Tu Tu"		Jatin–Lalit	
Daava	970	"Humse Hai Yaaro"		Jatin–Lalit	
Daava	971	"Deewane Hain Deewano Se"		Jatin–Lalit	
Daava	972	"One For All"		Jatin–Lalit	
Dhaal	978	"Gussa Ussa Chhod"	Anu Malik	Anu Malik	Dev Kohli
Dhaal	979	"Dhire Dhire Balam"		Anu Malik	Dev Kohli
Dhaal	980	"Whiskey Whiskey"		Anu Malik	Dev Kohli
Dharma Karma	1050	"Roothona Jane Tamana"	Kavita Krishnamurthy	Bappi Lahiri	
Dharma Karma	1051	"Teri Nakori Ne"		Bappi Lahiri	
Dil Ke Jharoke Main	1023	"Dil Ke Jharoke Main"	Alka Yagnik, Kavita Krishnamurthy, Solo	Bappi Lahiri	Majrooh Sultanpuri
Dil Ke Jharoke Main	1024	"Shahe Dilbara"		Bappi Lahiri	Majrooh Sultanpuri
Dil Ke Jharoke Main	1025	"Shama Ne Jalaaya Ho (Sad)"		Bappi Lahiri	Majrooh Sultanpuri
Dil Kitna Nadan Hai	1043	"Aayegi Barsaat Kahan Jayeinge"	Alka Yagnik	Anu Malik	
Dil Kitna Nadan Hai	1044	"Dil Kitna Nadan Hai"		Anu Malik	
Dil Kitna Nadan Hai	1045	"Mohabbat Ka Maza Paya"		Anu Malik	
Dil Kitna Nadan Hai	1046	"Mohabbat Naam Hai Kiska"		Anu Malik	
Dil Kitna Nadan Hai	1047	"Nazar Ki Baat Hai"		Anu Malik	
Dil To Pagal Hai	934	"Chanda Ki Chandni"	Lata Mangeshkar	Uttam Singh	Anand Bakshi
Do Ankhen Barah Hath	1039	"Jo Bhi Dekhe Aap Ko"	Alka Yagnik, Kavita Krishnamurthy	Bappi Lahiri	Indeevar
Do Ankhen Barah Hath	1040	"Kasam Se Kasam Se"		Bappi Lahiri	Indeevar
Do Ankhen Barah Hath	1041	"Mile Jo Tere Naina"		Bappi Lahiri	Indeevar
Do Ankhen Barah Hath	1042	"Ho Gaya Ji Ho Gaya"		Bappi Lahiri	Indeevar
Ek Phool Teen Kante	1026	"Ye Kaisa Nasha"	Alka Yagnik	Jatin–Lalit	Sameer
Ek Phool Teen Kante	1027	"Jaanam Mere Humdum Meri Zindagi"		Jatin–Lalit	Sameer
Gudgudee	1028	"Har Pal Chahe Mera Dil"	Kavita Krishnomurti, Solo	Bappi Lahiri	Yogesh, Amit Khanna
Gudgudee	1029	"Kyun Phisalta Hai Dil"		Bappi Lahiri	
Gudgudee	1030	"Mausam Suhaana Hai"		Bappi Lahiri	
Gudgudee	1031	"Main To Pritam Ko"		Bappi Lahiri	
Gundagardi	985	"Bahar Baras Raha Hai Pani"	Solo, Alka Yagnik, Sadhana Sargam, Kavita Krishnamurthy	Jatin–Lalit	Maya Govind, Kavita Kiran, Shyam Raj, Anwar Sagar, Shaym Anuragi
Gundagardi	986	"Bheja Jo Pyar Aapne"		Jatin–Lalit	
Gundagardi	987	"Jaadu Bhari Teri Aankhen Sanam"		Jatin–Lalit	
Gundagardi	988	"Sooraj Ka Ishq Din Se"		Jatin–Lalit	
Gundagardi	989	"Ye Resham Ki"		Jatin–Lalit	
Gupt: The Hidden Truth	939	"Mere Khwabon Mein Tu"	Alka Yagnik, Kavita Krishnamurthy	Viju Shah	Anand Bakshi
Gupt: The Hidden Truth	940	"Yeh Pyaar Kya Hai"		Viju Shah	Anand Bakshi
Hameshaa	1005	"Dil Tujhpe Fida"	Sadhana Sargam, Alka Yagnik	Anu Malik	Rahat Indori, Dev Kohli
Hameshaa	1006	"Aisa Milan Kal Ho Na Ho"		Anu Malik	
Hameshaa	1007	"Hameshaa Hameshaa"		Anu Malik	
Hero No. 1	942	"Saton Janam Tujko Paate"	Alka Yagnik	Anand–Milind	Sameer
Hero No. 1	943	"Main Tujhko Bhaga Laya"		Anand–Milind	Sameer
Ishq	935	"Neend Churai Meri"	Udit Narayan, Alka Yagnik, Kavita Krishnamurthy, Vibha Sharma	Anu Malik	Javed Akhtar, Rahat Indori
Ishq	936	"Kaise Kahoon Kaise Ho Tum"		Anu Malik	
Itihaas	958	"Chori Chori Dil Deke"	Sadhana Sargam, Alka Yagnik	Dilip Sen - Sameer Sen	Sameer
Itihaas	959	"Sathi Mere Tere Bina"		Dilip Sen - Sameer Sen	Sameer
Jeeo Shaan Se	1013	"Gar Pyar Na Kiya"	Kavita Krishnamurthy	Shyam Surendar	Sateesh, Nawab Arzoo
Jeeo Shaan Se	1014	"Radha Radha Kishan Kishan"		Shyam Surendar	
Judge Mujrim	967	"Qatra Shabnam Ka Shola Banne Laga"	Kavita Krishnamurthy	Bappi Lahiri	Anwar Sagar
Judwaa	946	"Duniya Mein Aaye"	Kavita Krishnamurthy, Poornima	Anu Malik	Dev Kohli
Judwaa	947	"Tera Aana Tera Jaana"		Anu Malik	Dev Kohli
Judwaa	948	"Tu Mere Dil Mein Bas Ja"		Anu Malik	Dev Kohli
Kaalia	977	"Saawan Ki Raat Suhani"	Poornima	Anand Raj Anand	
Kaun Sachcha Kaun Jhootha	1015	"Wadoo Ki Suhani Sham"	Preeti Singh, Alka Yagnik	Rajesh Roshan	Sameer
Kaun Sachcha Kaun Jhootha	1016	"Dil Se Judi Dil Ki"		Rajesh Roshan	Sameer
Koi Kisise Kum Nahin	1011	"Sanwali Haseena Kabhi Mil"	Kavita Krishnamurthy, Abhijeet	Anand Raj Anand	Anand Raj Anand
Koi Kisise Kum Nahin	1012	"Humko Hone De Sharabi"		Anand Raj Anand	Anand Raj Anand
Koyla	944	"Dekha Tujhe To"	Alka Yagnik, Preeti Singh, Falguni Pathak	Rajesh Roshan	Indeewar
Koyla	945	"Badan Juda Hote Hai"		Rajesh Roshan	Indeewar
Krishna Arjun	1032	"Andekha Anjaana Aaya Kaisa"	Alka Yagnik, Suresh Wadkar	Arup-Pranay	Yogesh, Nitesh Raj
Krishna Arjun	1033	"Main Hoon Krishna Tu Hai Arjun"		Arup-Pranay	
Lahu Ke Do Rang	963	"Mujhe Paisa Mila"	Alka Yagnik	Anand–Milind	Sameer
Lahu Ke Do Rang	964	"Awara Pagal Deewana"		Anand–Milind	Sameer
Lav Kush	1022	"Tak Dhina Dhin"	Alka Yagnik	Raamlaxman	Dev Kohli
Loha	983	"Toot Gaya Dil"	Solo	Tabun	Sawan Kumar, Nitin Raikwar
Mr. and Mrs. Khiladi	957	"Jab Naukri Milegi"	Solo	Anu Malik	Anu Malik
Mrityudand	984	"Tum Bin Mann Ki Baat"	Sadhana Sargam	Anand–Milind	Javed Akhtar
Naseeb	952	"Shikwa Nahin Kisise"	Alka Yagnik, Anuradha Paudwal	Nadeem-Shravan	Sameer
Naseeb	953	"Kabhi Jo Bhoolna Chahoon"		Nadeem-Shravan	Sameer
Naseeb	954	"Churalenge Hum Sab Ke Samne"		Nadeem-Shravan	Sameer
Nirnayak	1048	"Dil Mera Ghar Hai Aapka"	Alka Yagnik	Bappi Lahiri	Indeevar
Nirnayak	1049	"Teri Hansi Ne Kuch"		Bappi Lahiri	Indeevar
Pardes	937	"Do Dil Mil Rahe Hain"		Nadeem-Shravan	Anand Bakshi
Pardes	938	"Meri Mehbooba"	Alka Yagnik	Nadeem-Shravan	Anand Bakshi
Prithvi	965	"Jis Ghadi Tujhko Mere Rab Ne"	Sujata Trivedi	Viju Shah	Jalees Sherwani
Salma Pe Dil Aa Gaya	1052	"Phool Main Bhejoon"	Lata Mangeshkar, Alka Yagnik	Aadesh Shrivastava	Sawaan Kumar Tak, Ravindra Jain
Salma Pe Dil Aa Gaya	1053	"Bekali Bekhudi"		Aadesh Shrivastava	
Salma Pe Dil Aa Gaya	1054	"Mere Paaon Main"		Aadesh Shrivastava	
Sanam	994	"Ankhon Mein Neende Na Dil"	Alka Yagnik, Sadhana Sargam	Anand–Milind	Sameer
Sanam	995	"Ishq Mein Mere Rabba"		Anand–Milind	Sameer
Sanam	996	"Kal Tak Jo Maine Na"		Anand–Milind	Sameer
Suraj	982	"Ek Ladki Nache Raaste Mein"	Poornima	Anand-Milind	
Tamanna	997	"Yeh Kya Hua"	Solo, Alka Yagnik	Anu Malik	Makhdoom Mohiuddin, Rahat Indori, Indeevar
Tamanna	999	"Yeh Aaine Jo Tumhe"		Anu Malik	
Tamanna	1000	"Shabke Jage Hue (Male)"		Anu Malik	
Tarazu	973	"Ae Deewane Dil"	Alka Yagnik, Sadhana Sargam, Solo	Rajesh Roshan	Sameer
Tarazu	974	"Su Su Su Aa Gaya"		Rajesh Roshan	Sameer
Tarazu	975	"Mujhe Na Chup Rehna"		Rajesh Roshan	Sameer
Udaan	1008	"Kal Raat Sapne Mein"	Alka Yagnik	Anand–Milind	Sameer
Udaan	1009	"Badal Garja Bijlee Chamki"		Anand–Milind	Sameer
Udaan	1010	"Jab Jab Dekhun Tujhe"		Anand–Milind	Sameer
Uff! Yeh Mohabbat	1034	"Jab Se Hai Sikha"	Alka Yagnik, Kavita Krishnamurthy, Solo	Nikhil-Vinay	Rani Malik
Uff! Yeh Mohabbat	1035	"Barso Ke Baad"		Nikhil-Vinay	Rani Malik
Uff! Yeh Mohabbat	1036	"Haan Mujhe Tumse Mohabbat Hai"		Nikhil-Vinay	Rani Malik
Uff! Yeh Mohabbat	1037	"Utra Na Dil Me Koi"		Nikhil-Vinay	Rani Malik
Virasat	950	"Tare Hain Barati"	Jaspinder Narula, K. S. Chithra	Anu Malik	Javed Akhtar
Virasat	951	"Payalay Chunmun"		Anu Malik	Javed Akhtar
Yes Boss	949	"Ek Din Aap"	Alka Yagnik	Jatin–Lalit	Javed Akhtar
Yeshwant	955	"Ambar Se Noor Liya"	Solo	Anand–Milind	Sameer
Yeshwant	956	"Tum Samne Baitho"	Solo	Anand–Milind	Sameer
Zameer: The Awakening of a Soul	1001	"Laila Laila Laila"	Sadhana Sargam, Alka Yagnik	Anand–Milind	Sameer
Zameer: The Awakening of a Soul	1002	"Mujhe Ek Ladki"		Anand–Milind	Sameer
Zameer: The Awakening of a Soul	1003	"Tere Nagme"		Anand–Milind	Sameer
Zameer: The Awakening of a Soul	1004	"Tune Pyar Ka Jaadu"		Anand–Milind	Sameer
Ziddi	941	"O Haseena"	Chithra	Dilip Sen - Sameer Sen	Sameer

=== 1998 ===
Film(s)	No.	Song name(s)	Co-singer(s)	Music director(s)	Lyricist(s)
2001: Do Hazaar Ek	1095	"Teri Meei Dosti"	Udit Narayan, Anuradha Paudwal	Anand Raj Anand	Dev Kohli
2001: Do Hazaar Ek	1096	"Yun Na Rootho Jaan Meri"		Anand Raj Anand	Dev Kohli
Achanak	1093	"Duniya Bhulake"	Alka Yagnik	Dilil Sen - Sameer Sen	Sameer
Ajnabi Saaya	1154	"Aa Ke Manzil Pe"	Solo	Dilip Dutta	
Ajnabi Saaya	1155	"Mujhe Peene Ki Aadat Nahin"	Solo	Dilip Dutta	
Aunty No. 1	1088	"Chin China China"	Udit Narayan, Sadhana Sargam, Poornima	Anand–Milind	Sameer
Bada Din	1129	"Kahta Hai Yeh Safar"	Alka Yagnik, Solo	Jatin–Lalit	Javed Akhtar
Bada Din	1130	"Suno Zara"		Jatin–Lalit	Javed Akhtar
Badmaash	1115	"Hon Tha Jo Ho Gaya"	Kavita Krishnamurthy, Sadhana Sargam	Shyam-Surender	Satish, Rani Malik
Badmaash	1116	"Pehle Nahin Thi Kabhi"		Shyam-Surender	
Bandhan	1073	"Bandhan (Title)"	Solo	Anand Raj Anand, Himesh Reshammiya	Dev Kohli, Sudhakar Sharma, Rajesh Malik
Bandhan	1074	"Tere Dum Se Hai Mera Dum"	Solo		
Bandhan	1075	"Bandhan (Sad)"	Solo		
Barood	1090	"Hum To Tujhse Mohabbat"	Alka Yagnik	Anand–Milind	Sameer
Barood	1091	"Ek Ladki Ek Ladka"		Anand–Milind	Sameer
Dand Nayak	1113	"Memsab Dil Mera Dhadke"	Alka Yagnik	Rajesh Roshan	Anand Bakshi
Dand Nayak	1114	"Tera Bhi Ye Haal Huya"		Rajesh Roshan	Anand Bakshi
Deewana Hoon Pagal Nahi	1111	"Nazaro Me Rang Hai Tumhare Labo Ka"	Alka Yagnik, Vijeta Pandit	Aadesh Shrivastava	Dev Kohli
Deewana Hoon Pagal Nahi	1112	"Jab Se Mile Do Dil"		Aadesh Shrivastava	Dev Kohli
Dhoondte Reh Jaaoge!	1128	"Na Tum Bolo"	Alka Yagnik	Jatin–Lalit	Majrooh Sultanpuri
Do Numbri	1142	"Aankhon Ki Chandni"	Alka Yagnik	Tabun Sutradhar	
Duplicate	1076	"Kathai Aankhon Wali"	Kavita Krishnamurthy, Solo	Anu Malik	Javed Akhter
Duplicate	1077	"Wah Ji Wah"		Anu Malik	Javed Akhter
Duplicate	1078	"Ek Sharaarat"		Anu Malik	Javed Akhter
Dushman	1084	"Pyar Ko Ho Jane Do"	Lata Mangeshkar	Uttam Singh	Anand Bakshi
Dushman	1085	"Khoobsurat Ho Sakti Hai"		Uttam Singh	Anand Bakshi
Ek Tha Dil Ek Thi Dhadkan	1141	"Ek Tha Dil Ek Thi Dhadkan"	Solo	Anand Raj Anand	Javed Akhtar
Gharwali Baharwali	1079	"Tara Rara Rara"	Anuradha Sriram	Anu Malik	Dev Kohli
Ghulam	1064	"Aankhon Se Tune Kya"	Alka Yagnik	Jatin–Lalit	Sameer
Ghulam	1065	"Jadu Hai Tera Hi Jadu"		Jatin–Lalit	Sameer
Gunda	1100	"Teri Aankhon Ka Chal Gaya Jadoo"	Kavita Krishnamurthy	Anand Raj Anand	Dev Kohli
Hafta Vasuli	1117	"Gagan Choo Lo Mei"	Kavita Krishnamurthy	Rajesh Roshan	Mohan Sharma
Hatyara	1138	"O Sanam Tu Le Kasam"	Sapna Mukherjee	Dilip Sen - Sameer Sen	
Hatyara	1139	"Laal Batti Ke"		Dilip Sen - Sameer Sen	
Hero Hindustani	1102	"Deewana Deewana Mein Tera"	Alka Yagnik, Sadhana Sargam	Anu Malik	Zammer Qazmi, Rahat Indori
Hero Hindustani	1103	"Hero Hindustani Hero"		Anu Malik	
Himmatwala	1140	"Main To Tere Pyar Mein"	Kavita Krishnamurthy	Tabun Sutradhar	
Hitler	1101	"Galon Se Khelun Main"	Sadhana Sargam	Dilip Sen-Sameer Sen	
Iski Topi Uske Sarr	1105	"Pagal Tujhe Main Kardunga"	Solo	Anu Malik	Faaiz Anwar
Jaane Jigar	1126	"So Barso Tak Main"	Kavita Krishnamurthy	Rajesh Roshan	Javed Akhtar
Jaane Jigar	1127	"Chahne Wale Aaj"		Rajesh Roshan	Javed Akhtar
Jab Pyaar Kisise Hota Hai	1067	"Pehli Pehli Baar"	Lata Mangeshkar, Alka Yagnik	Jatin–Lalit	Anand Bakshi
Jab Pyaar Kisise Hota Hai	1068	"O Jaana Na Jaana"		Jatin–Lalit	Anand Bakshi
Jab Pyaar Kisise Hota Hai	1069	"Madhosh Dil Ki Dhadkan"		Jatin–Lalit	Anand Bakshi
Jab Pyaar Kisise Hota Hai	1070	"Ek Dil Tha"		Jatin–Lalit	Anand Bakshi
Jab Pyaar Kisise Hota Hai	1071	"Dil Mein Basake"		Jatin–Lalit	Anand Bakshi
Jab Pyaar Kisise Hota Hai	1072	"O Jaana Yeh Mana (Part 2)"		Jatin–Lalit	Anand Bakshi
Jiyaala	1149	"Tu Hi Tu"	Alka Yagnik, Sadhana Sargam	Altamash Khan	
Jiyaala	1150	"Pat Pat Patakha"		Altamash Khan	
Jiyaala	1151	"Kal Chaudhvi Ki Raat Thi"		Altamash Khan	
Jiyaala	1152	"Mera Dil Dhadakta Hai"		Altamash Khan	
Jiyaala	1153	"Teri Lat Lehrai Hai"		Altamash Khan	
Kabhi Na Kabhi	1099	"Mill Gayi Mill Gayi Woh Saari Manzile"	Alka Yagnik	A. R. Rahman	Javed Akhtar
Kareeb	1080	"Chori Chori Jab Nazrein Mili"	Sanjeevani	Anu Malik	Rahat Indori
Kareeb	1081	"Chura Lo Na Dil Mera"		Anu Malik	Rahat Indori
Kareeb	1082	"Haan Judai Se Darta Hai Dil"		Anu Malik	Rahat Indori
Kareeb	1083	"Chori Chori Kismat Ne Awaaz Di"		Anu Malik	Rahat Indori
Keemat – They Are Back	1089	"Mere Humsafar"	Alka Yagnik	Rajesh Roshan	Indeevar
Khote Sikkey	1122	"Na Todoge Dil Tum Mera"	Alka Yagnik, Poornima	Rajesh Roshan	Indeevar, Maya Govind
Khote Sikkey	1123	"Sahiba Kehde Haan"		Rajesh Roshan	
Khote Sikkey	1124	"Sari Duniya Bole Tune"		Rajesh Roshan	
Kuch Kuch Hota Hai	1055	"Saajanji Ghar Aaye",	Kavita Krishnamurthy, Alka Yagnik	Jatin–Lalit	Sameer
Kuch Kuch Hota Hai	1056	"Ladki Badi Anjaani Hai"		Jatin–Lalit	Sameer
Kudrat	1119	"Humse Mohabbat Mein"	Sadhana Sargam	Rajesh Roshan	
Mafia Raaj	1118	"Ladki Kanwari Ne"	Kavita Krishnamurthy, Sudesh Bhosle	Dilip Sen - Sameer Sen	Zaheer Anwar
Mahaatma	1143	"Unse Nazren Mili"	Kavita Krishnamurthy	Anil Mohile	
Main Phir Aaoongi	1148	"Tanhai Ne Li Angdai"	Alka Yagnik	Sameer-Shyam	
Main Solah Baras Ki	1134	"Do Dilon Ki Dastan Mein"	Alka Yagnik, Anuradha Paudwal, Kavita Krishnamurthy, Udit Narayan	Rajesh Roshan	Anand Bakshi
Main Solah Baras Ki	1135	"Sach Huva Hai Sapna"		Rajesh Roshan	Anand Bakshi
Main Solah Baras Ki	1136	"Pal Ye Kehta Hai"		Rajesh Roshan	Anand Bakshi
Main Solah Baras Ki	1137	"Main Pukaroon"		Rajesh Roshan	Anand Bakshi
Major Saab	1066	"Tere Pyar Mein Main Madhosh Raha"	Solo	Anand Raj Anand	Dev Kohli
Mard	1098	"Aankhon Mein Hai Kya"	Alka Yagnik	Dilip Sen - Sameer Sen	Rani Malik
Mehndi	1125	"Sach Puchho"	Solo	Babul Bose	Rani Malik
Mere Do Anmol Ratan	1131	"Ice Cream Vanila"	Anuradha Paudwal, Poornima, Udit Narayan, Sonu Nigam	Rajesh Roshan	
Mere Do Anmol Ratan	1132	"Titli Ke Pankhon"		Rajesh Roshan	
Mere Do Anmol Ratan	1133	"Puncho Na Hai Kaisi"		Rajesh Roshan	
Military Raaj	1097	"Rim Jhim Rim Jhim"	Poornima	Bappi Lahiri	
Miss 420	1109	"Mere Dil Mein Rehte Ho"	Solo	Anu Malik	
Mohabbat Aur Jung	1106	"Dil Leke Haatho Mein",	Alka Yagnik, Kavita Krishnamurthy	Dilip Sen - Sameer Sen	
Mohabbat Aur Jung	1107	"Humko Tu Pyar Huwe"		Dilip Sen - Sameer Sen	
Pyaar Kiya To Darna Kya	1062	"Odh Li Chunariya",	Alka Yagnik, Kavita Krishnamurthy	Himesh Reshammiya	Sudhakar Sharma, Sameer
Pyaar Kiya To Darna Kya	1063	"Tum Par Hum Hai Atke"		Himesh Reshammiya	
Pyaar To Hona Hi Tha	1061	"Jab Kisi Ki Taraf Dil"	Solo	Jatin–Lalit	Sameer
Saazish	1110	"Zindagi Bin Pyar Ke"	Solo	Jatin–Lalit	Israr Ansari
Salaakhen	1120	"Dil Mera Le Gayi"	Alka Yagnik	Dilip Sen - Sameer Sen	Sameer
Sar Utha Ke Jiyo	1108	"Deewana Deewana"	Sadhana Sargam	Anand–Milind	
Sham Ghansham	1104	"Mitwa Re"	Alka Yagnik	Vishal Bhardwaj	
Sher Khan	1147	"Akhiyan Charne Wali"	Solo	Bappi Lahiri	
Soldier	1057	"Soldier Soldier"	Alka Yagnik, Hema Sardesai	Anu Malik	Sameer
Soldier	1058	"Mehfil Mein Baar Baar"		Anu Malik	Sameer
Soldier	1059	"Mere Dil Jigar Se"		Anu Malik	Sameer
Soldier	1060	"Hum To Dil Chahen Tumhara"		Anu Malik	Sameer
Wajood	1086	"Main Sochta Hoon"	Alka Yagnik	Anu Malik	Javed Akhtar
Wajood	1087	"Aur Hum Tum"		Anu Malik	Javed Akhtar
Yeh Aashiqui Meri	1144	"Itna To Kaha De"	Alka Yagnik	Ajit Verman	
Yeh Aashiqui Meri	1145	"Ye Aashki Meri"		Ajit Verman	
Yeh Aashiqui Meri	1146	"Zindagi Hai Ye"		Ajit Verman	
Yugpurush	1094	"Chale Hum Do Jan Sair"	Ravindra Sathe	Rajesh Roshan	Majrooh Sultanpuri
Zakhm	1092	"Hum Yahan Tum Yahan"	Solo	M. M. Keeravani	Anand Bakshi
Zulm-O-Sitam	1121	"Aankh Lad Gayi"	Poornima	Aadesh Shrivastava	

=== 1999 ===
Film(s)	No.	Song name(s)	Co-Singer(s)	Music director(s)	Lyricist(s)
Aa Ab Laut Chalen	1173	"O Yaaro Maaf Karna"	Alka Yagnik, Abhijeet, Shabbir Kumar, Sonu Nigam, Saud Khan,& Vijeta	Nadeem-Shravan	Sameer
Aa Ab Laut Chalen	1174	"Yeh Kaisi Mulaqat Hai"		Nadeem-Shravan	Sameer
Aa Ab Laut Chalen	1175	"O Yaaro Maaf Karna (Sad)"		Nadeem-Shravan	Sameer
Aarzoo	1193	"Mil Jate Hain"	Alka Yagnik, Udit Narayan	Anu Malik	Anand Bakshi
Aarzoo	1194	"Ab Tere Dil Mein Hum"		Anu Malik	Anand Bakshi
Aarzoo	1195	"Dosti Karte Nahin"		Anu Malik	Anand Bakshi
Anari No.1	1180	"Le Aaya Hoon"	Preeti Uttam		
Arjun Pandit	1178	"O Priya"	Alka Yagnik		
Biwi No.1	1160	"Jungle Hai Aadhi Raat"	Hema Sardesai	Anu Malik	Sameer
Chehraa	1229	"Had Se Zyada Aati Hai"	Alka Yagnik		
Chehraa	1230	"Chehra Apna Dekhte Hai"			
Chehraa	1232	"Tere Badan Mein"			
Chehraa	1231	"Ek To Aisi Ladki"			
Chehraa	1233	"Sach Much Mein To"			
Daag The Fire	1176	"Dil Deewaana Na Jaane"	Anuradha Paudwal		
Daag The Fire	1177	"Chehra Tera Chehra"			
Dahek	1221	"Tujhe Dekhte Hi Ye Dil Kho Gaya Hai"	Alka Yagnik		
Dil Kya Kare	1179	"Yeh Dil Kya Kare (Sad)"	Alka Yagnik	Jatin–Lalit	Anand Bakshi
Dillagi	1169	"Main Kya Karoon"	Solo	Jatin–Lalit	Javed Akhtar
Gair	1204	"Aaj Ki Raat Naya Geet"	Poornima, Alka Yagnik, Kavita Krishnamurthy		
Gair	1205	"Aankhon Mein Mohabbat Hai"			
Gair	1206	"Mere Dil Ne Chupke Se"			
Gair	1207	"Tu Aaja Meri Bahon Mein"			
Hello Brother	1170	"Teri Chunariya"	Alka Yagnik	Himesh Reshammiya	Sudhakar Sharma
Hote Hote Pyar Ho Gaya	1224	"Jab Tum Mere"	Solo		
Hum Aapke Dil Mein Rehte Hain	1161	"Kasam Se Kasam Se"	Anuradha Paudwal	Anu Malik	Sameer
Hum Aapke Dil Mein Rehte Hain	1162	"Zara Aankhon Mein"		Anu Malik	Sameer
Hum Aapke Dil Mein Rehte Hain	1163	"Hum Aapke Dil Mein Rehte Hain"		Anu Malik	Sameer
Hum Dil De Chuke Sanam	1159	"Aankhon Ki Gustakhiyan"	Kavita Krishnamurthy	Ismail Darbar	Mehboob Kotwal
Hum Saath Saath Hain	1156	"Hum Saath Saath Hain"	Udit Narayan, Anuradha Paudwal, Hariharan, Alka Yagnik, Kavita Krishnamurthy	Raamlaxman	R.Kiran, Mitali Shashank, Ravinder Rawal, Dev Kholi
Hum Saath Saath Hain	1157	"Chhote Chhote Bhaiyon Ke"		Raamlaxman	
Hum Saath Saath Hain	1158	"Mhare Hiwda"		Raamlaxman	
International Khiladi	1182	"Halka Halka Dard Hai"	Kavita Krishnamurthy, Alka Yagnik	Aadesh Shrivastava	Dev Kohli
International Khiladi	1183	"Chookar Mere Man Ko"		Aadesh Shrivastava	Dev Kohli
Jaalsaaz	1234	"Kangana Bole Khanan Khanan"	Alka Yagnik	Dilip Sen-Sameer Sen	Sameer
Jaanam Samjha Karo	1181	"Love Hua"	Alka Yagnik	Anu Malik	Majrooh Sultanpuri
Kachche Dhaage	1165	"Pyaar Nahin Karna Jahan"	Alka Yagnik, Lata Mangeshkar	Nusrat Fateh Ali Khan	Anand Bakshi
Kachche Dhaage	1166	"Dil Perdesi Ho Gaya"		Nusrat Fateh Ali Khan	Anand Bakshi
Kachche Dhaage	1167	"Band Lifafa Dil Mera"		Nusrat Fateh Ali Khan	Anand Bakshi
Kachche Dhaage	1168	"Ek Jawani Teri Ek Jawani"		Nusrat Fateh Ali Khan	Anand Bakshi
Khoobsurat	1184	"Ghoonghat Mein Chaand"	Kavita Krishnamurthy, Anuradha Paudwal		
Khoobsurat	1185	"Aana Zara Paas To Aa"			
Khoobsurat	1186	"Mera Ek Sapna Hai"			
Lohpurush	1222	"Band Kamre Mein"	Alisha Chinoy, Poornima		
Lohpurush	1223	"Rooth Ke Jaanewali Nakhrewali"			
Manchala	1216	"Pyara Pyar Ka Nasha"	Kavita Krishnamurthy, Alka Yagnik, Lata Mangeshkar	Ram-Laxman	
Manchala	1217	"Khata Na Koi Ho Jaye"		Ram-Laxman	
Manchala	1218	"Ghadi Se Kaho Zaraa"		Ram-Laxman	
Manchala	1219	"Ae Mere Humsafar (Male)"		Ram-Laxman	
Mother	1228	"Jiya I Want To Love You"	Anuradha Paudwal		
Pyaar Koi Khel Nahin	1187	"Pyaar Koi Khel Nahin"	Solo	Jatin–Lalit	Majrooh Sultanpuri
Pyaar Koi Khel Nahin	1188	"Pyaar Koi Khel Nahin (Sad)"	Solo	Jatin–Lalit	Majrooh Sultanpuri
Rajaji	1200	"Sunday Ki Raat Thi"	Sapna Mukherjee, Alka Yagnik	Anand–Milind	Sameer
Rajaji	1201	"Raja Chalo Akele Mein"		Anand–Milind	Sameer
Safari	1209	"Tumse Mohabbat"	Kavita Krishnamurthy, Sadhna Sargam	Shyam-Mohan	Rani Malik
Safari	1210	"Koo Koo Dil Yeh Bole"		Shyam-Mohan	Rani Malik
Sangharsh	1198	"Naraz Savera Hai"			
Sangharsh	1199	"Nazdeek Savera Hai"			
Sar Ankhon Par	1235	"Aap Ka Pyaar Sar Aankhon Par"	Alka Yagnik, Kavita Krishnamurti		
Sar Ankhon Par	1236	"Badi Joro Ka"			
Sar Ankhon Par	1237	"Tere Thanda Paani"			
Sar Ankhon Par	1238	"Zamana Ruke Par"			
Sar Ankhon Par	1239	"Zindagi Hai Kahan"			
Sarfarosh	1164	"Jo Haal Dil Ka"	Alka Yagnik	Jatin–Lalit	Sameer
Sautela	1225	"Behna Ri Pyari Pyari"	Kavita Krishnamurthy, Anuradha Paudwal		
Sautela	1226	"Haule Haule Pyar Karo Na"			
Sautela	1227	"Na Honge Hum Juda"			
Sikandar Sadak Ka	1240	"Apni Yaari Apna Pyar"	Solo, Poornima		
Sikandar Sadak Ka	1241	Kudi Kudi Re"			
Silsila Hai Pyar Ka	1202	"Yeh Dil Deewana"	Anuradha Paudwal, Alka Yagnik	Jatin–Lalit	Sameer
Silsila Hai Pyar Ka	1203	"Yeh Silsila Hai Pyar Ka"		Jatin–Lalit	Sameer
Sirf Tum	1196	"Uparwala Apne Saath Hai"			
Sirf Tum	1197	"Pehli Pehli Baar Mohabbat Ki Hai"			
Sooryavansham	1189	"Dil Mere Tu Deewana Hai"			
Sooryavansham	1190	"Har Subah Bahut Yaad"			
Sooryavansham	1191	"Kore Kore Sapne"			
Sooryavansham	1192	"Dil Mere Tu Deewana Hai (Sad)"			
Trishakti	1220	"Doston Ke Liye Aaj"	Udit Narayan, Sonu Nigam		
Vaastav: The Reality	1171	"Apni to Nikal Padi"	Atul Kale, Solo	Jatin–Lalit	Sameer
Vaastav: The Reality	1172	"Tere Pyar Ne"		Jatin–Lalit	Sameer
Yeh Hai Mumbai Meri Jaan	1211	"Mera Chand Mujhe Aaya Hai Nazar"	Solo, Alka Yagnik	Jatin–Lalit	Indeevar
Yeh Hai Mumbai Meri Jaan	1212	"Wada Kiya Humne"		Jatin–Lalit	Indeevar
Yeh Hai Mumbai Meri Jaan	1213	"Humko Aawaz De"		Jatin–Lalit	Indeevar
Yeh Hai Mumbai Meri Jaan	1214	"Yeh Ghadi Sanam"		Jatin–Lalit	Indeevar
Yeh Hai Mumbai Meri Jaan	1215	"Teri Chahat Ke Deewane"		Jatin–Lalit	Indeevar
Zulmi	1208	"Bhool Se Humne Bhool Ki"	Asha Bhosle		

== 2000s ==
=== 2000 ===
Film(s)	No.	Song name(s)	Co-Singer(s)	Music director(s)	Lyricist(s)
Aaghaaz	1281	"Dil Ko Pathar"	Alka Yagnik		
Aaghaaz	1282	"Nav Nav Lakha"			
Agniputra	1296	"Tune Mujhe Pukara"	Anuradha Paudwal		
Baaghi	1283	"Khaai Hai Kasam"	Kavita Krishnamurthy		
Baaghi	1284	"Tumhi Ko Chahata Hai Dil"			
Beti No.1	1294	"Dil Se Dil Takraya"	Kavita Krishnamurthy	Viju Shah	Dev Kohli, Nawab Arzoo
Beti No.1	1295	"Palkon Pe Aao"		Viju Shah	
Bulandi	1277	"Mujhe Hichki Lagi"	Anuradha Paudwal	Viju Shah	Anand Bakshi
Bulandi	1278	"Hum Ne Tum Ko"		Viju Shah	Anand Bakshi
Chal Mere Bhai	1250	"Thodi Si Beqarari"	Alka Yagnik	Anand–Milind	Sameer
Deewane	1268	"Pyar Ke Hain Hum Deewane"	Udit Narayan, Alka Yagnik		Sameer
Dhadkan	1251	"Dil Ne Yeh Kaha Hai Dil Se"	Udit Narayan, Alka Yagnik	Nadeem-Shravan	Sameer
Dhadkan	1252	"Tum Dil Ki Dhadkan Mein (Sad)"		Nadeem-Shravan	Sameer
Dulhan Hum Le Jayenge	1247	"Mujhse Shaadi Karogi"	Alka Yagnik, Shankar Mahadevan, Ehsaan Noorani, Sunita Rao	Himesh Reshammiya	Sudhakar Sharma
Dulhan Hum Le Jayenge	1248	"Dulhan Hum Le Jayenge"		Himesh Reshammiya	Sudhakar Sharma
Dulhan Hum Le Jayenge	1249	"Hai Na Bolo"		Himesh Reshammiya	Sudhakar Sharma
Gang	1285	"Dil Hai Bechain Aaja"	Sadhana Sargam	Anu Malik	Javed Akhtar
Hamara Dil Aapke Paas Hai	1250	"Tumko Dekha To"	Alka Yagnik	Sanjeev Darshan	Javed Akhtar
Hum To Mohabbat Karega	1274	"Tere Aagey Peechey"	Alka Yagnik	Anu Malik	Majrooh Sultanpuri
Hum To Mohabbat Karega	1275	"Yeh Khushi Ki Mehfil"		Anu Malik	Majrooh Sultanpuri
Hum To Mohabbat Karega	1276	" Suno Suno Kaho Kaho"		Anu Malik	Majrooh Sultanpuri
Joru Ka Ghulam	1267	"Khula Hai Mera Pinjra"	Alka Yagnik		Sameer
Jung	1269	"Mere Bina Tum"	Alka Yagnik, Hema Sardesai		Sameer
Jung	1270	"Dil Mein Jigar Mein"			Sameer
Jungle	1262	"Jaan Kahan Hai Tu"	Sunidhi Chauhan		
Kaali Topi Laal Rumaal	1292	"Badan Mein Jadoo"			
Kaali Topi Laal Rumaal	1291	"Tere Mere Pyar Ka"	Kavita Krishnamurti		
Kahin Pyaar Na Ho Jaaye	1263	"Kahin Pyaar Na Ho Jaaye"	Alka Yagnik, Nitin Mukesh, Kamaal Khan, Sonu Nigam	Himesh Reshammiya	Sudhakar Sharma, Rajesh Malik,
Kahin Pyaar Na Ho Jaaye	1264	"Dhin Tara Dhin Tara"		Himesh Reshammiya	
Kahin Pyaar Na Ho Jaaye	1265	"O Priya O Priya"		Himesh Reshammiya	
Kahin Pyaar Na Ho Jaaye	1266	"Parody"		Himesh Reshammiya	
Kaho Naa... Pyaar Hai	1242	"Chand Sitare"	Solo	Rajesh Roshan	Sawan Kumar Tak
Karobaar: The Business of Love	1286	"Sunona Sunona"	Alka Yagnik, Asha Bhosle, Solo	Rajesh Roshan	Javed Akhtar
Karobaar: The Business of Love	1287	"Aao Aur Na Socho"		Rajesh Roshan	Javed Akhtar
Karobaar: The Business of Love	1288	"Duniyan Mein Sabse"		Rajesh Roshan	Javed Akhtar
Karobaar: The Business of Love	1289	"Chahiye Milne Ka Bahana"		Rajesh Roshan	Javed Akhtar
Khauff	1271	"O Gori Gori"	Solo	Anu Malik	Mehboob, Rani Malik
Khauff	1272	"Nateeja Hamari Mohabbat Ka"	Solo	Anu Malik	
Khiladi 420	1273	"Kaisa Yeh Pyar Hai"	Kavita Krishnamurthy	Sanjeev Darshan	Sameer
Kunwara	1260	"Mehendi Rachake"	Alka Yagnik	Aadesh Shrivastava	Sameer
Kunwara	1261	"Yeh Ladki Jawan Ho"		Aadesh Shrivastava	Sameer
Kurukshetra	1256	"Aap Ka Aana"	Alka Yagnik, Sonu Nigam	Himesh Reshammiya	Sameer
Kurukshetra	1257	"Chal Shaadi Kar Lete Hain"		Himesh Reshammiya	Sameer
Kurukshetra	1258	"Janam Tere Liye"		Himesh Reshammiya	Sameer
Kurukshetra	1259	"Ishq Bhi Kya Cheez Hai"		Himesh Reshammiya	Sameer
Kya Kehna	1243	"In Kadmon Ke Neeche"			
Kya Kehna	1244	"O Soniye Dil Jaaniye"			
Kya Kehna	1245	"Pyara Bhaiya Mera"			
Kya Kehna	1246	"Ae Sanam Meri Bahon"	Alka Yagnik, Sonu Nigam		
Mela	1247	"Dhadkan Mein Tum"	Alka Yagnik		
Papa The Great	1293	"Aao Humse Pyar"	Solo	Nikhil–Vinay	Faaiz Anwar
Raju Chacha	1255	"Ye Vaada Hai"			Anand Bakshi
Shikari	1279	"Bohot Khoobsurat Gazal"	Solo, Asha Bhosle		
Shikari	1280	"Bheja Hai Ek Gulaab"			
Sultaan	1290	"Kya Baat Hai"	Alka Yagnik		

=== 2001 ===
Film(s)	Song	Song name(s)	Co-Singer(s)	Music director(s)	Lyricist(s)
Aamdani Atthanni Kharcha Rupaiya	1313	"Aai Hai Divaali"	Alka Yagnik, Shaan, Sneha Pant, Udit Narayan		
Ajnabee	1305	"Meri Zindegi Mein Aajnabee Ka"	Sunidhi Chauhan	Anu Malik	Sameer
Ajnabee	1306	"Jab Tumhe Aashiqui Maloom Hogi"	Solo	Anu Malik	Sameer
Albela	1307	"Haiya Hoo Kya Masti"	Udit Narayan, Alka Yagnik	Jatin–Lalit	Sameer
Albela	1308	"Kaho To Zara"		Jatin–Lalit	Sameer
Censor	1335	"Hum Jo Rang Mein Aagye"	Udit Narayan, Alka Yagnik, Jaspinder Narula	Jatin–Lalit	Vinod Mahendra and Gopaldas Neeraj
Censor	1336	"Yaaron Jo Kal Tak"		Jatin–Lalit	
Chhupa Rustam	1317	"Yeh Chand Koi Deewana Hai"	Alka Yagnik		
Chhupa Rustam	1318	"Aisa Na Ho Aarman Jag Jaye"			
Chhupa Rustam	1319	"Pyar mein Dil To Sab Dete Hai"			
Dil Churaya Aapne	1337	"Tere Badle"	Kavita Krishnamurti	Suresh Wadkar	
Dil Ne Phir Yaad Kiya	1334	"Ye Mausam"	Alka Yagnik	Aadesh Shrivastava	Sameer
Ek Rishtaa: The Bond of Love	1299	"Dil Deewana Dhoondta Hai"	Mohammed Aziz, Alka Yagnik, Sarika Kapoor	Nadeem-Shravan	Sameer
Ek Rishtaa: The Bond of Love	1300	"Dil Lagaane Ki Sazaa"		Nadeem-Shravan	Sameer
Ek Rishtaa: The Bond of Love	1301	"Ek Dil Hai"		Nadeem-Shravan	Sameer
Ek Rishtaa: The Bond of Love	1302	"Hum Khush Hue"		Nadeem-Shravan	Sameer
Hadh: Life on the Edge of Death	1346	"Kya Hoti Hai Pyar Ki Hadh"	Alka Yagnik		Sameer
Hum Deewane Pyar Ke	1341	"Paani Tere Hothon Se Tapka"	Alka Yagnik, Udit Narayan	Anil-Anup	Rani Malik
Hum Deewane Pyar Ke	1342	"Humne Tumko Apna Banaya		Anil-Anup	
Hum Deewane Pyar Ke	1343	"Hum Hai Deewane"		Anil-Anup	
Hum Deewane Pyar Ke	1344	"Dekho Dekho College Mein Ek Ladki"		Anil-Anup	
Hum Ho Gaye Aapke	1324	"Hum Ho Gaye Aapke"	Alka Yagnik, Solo	Nadeem-Shravan	Sameer
Hum Ho Gaye Aapke	1325	"Pehli Baar Dil Yun"		Nadeem-Shravan	Sameer
Hum Ho Gaye Aapke	1326	"Der Se Hua (Male)"		Nadeem-Shravan	Sameer
Jodi No.1	1304	"Jodi No 1"			
Jodi No.1	1303	"Mera Dil Tera Thikana"	Sonu Nigam, Alka Yagnik		
Kasam	1327	"Teri Dhafli Meri Payal"	Solo, Sadhana Sargam		
Kasam	1328	"Teri Dhafli Meri Payal (Sad)"			
Kasam	1329	"Shaad Rahe Aabad Rahe"			
Kasoor	1314	"Koi To Saathi Chaahiye"	Alka Yagnik		
Kasoor	1316	"Mohabbat Ho Na Jaaye"			
Kasoor	1315	"Kal Raat Ho Gayi"			
Kuch Khatti Kuch Meethi	1310	"Neend Udh Rahi Hai"	Solo, Alka Yagnik, Sunidhi Chauhan	Anu Malik	Sameer
Kuch Khatti Kuch Meethi	1311	"Tumko Sirf Tumko"		Anu Malik	Sameer
Kuch Khatti Kuch Meethi	1312	"Saamne Baith Kar"		Anu Malik	Sameer
Meri Adalat	1339	"Palkon Pe Lagalo"	Alka Yagnik		Ranil Malik, Gauhar Kanpuri
Meri Adalat	1340	"Tum Tum Taara Re"			
Officer	1322	"Kaisa Samaa"	Alka Yagnik, Preeti Uttam		
Officer	1323	"Phoolon Se Rang"			
Paagalpan	1330	"Jhoote The Vaade"	Alka Yagnik	Raju Singh	Sameer
Paagalpan	1331	"Kahin Na Kahin Hai"		Raju Singh	Sameer
Pyaar Ishq Aur Mohabbat	1320	"Main Bewafa"	Kavita Krishnamurthy	Viju Shah	Anand Bakshi
Pyaar Ishq Aur Mohabbat	1321	"Donon Taraf Aag"		Viju Shah	Anand Bakshi
Pyaar Zindagi Hai	1347	"Sama Hai Suhana"	Solo, Kavita Krishnamurthy	Bali Brahmbhatt, Jaideep Choudhury	Bali Brahmbhatt
Pyaar Zindagi Hai	1348	"Phoolon Ne Kaha"			Bali Brahmbhatt
Uljhan	1350	"Shabnam Ye"			
Uljhan	1349	"Tune Ek Pal Ke"	Alka Yagnik, Kavita Krishnamurthy		
Yeh Raaste Hain Pyaar Ke	1309	"Mera Dil Ek Khali Kamra"	Anuradha Paudwal	Sanjeev Darshan	Anand Bakshi
Yeh Zindagi Ka Safar	1332	"Dil To Kehta Hai"	Solo	Daboo Malik	Anwar Sagar, Salim Bijnori
Yeh Zindagi Ka Safar	1333	"Halat Na Poochho Dil Ki"		Daboo Malik	

=== 2002 ===
Film(s)	No.	Song name(s)	Co-Singer(s)	Music director(s)	Lyricist(s)
Ansh: The Deadly Part	1379	"Hum Apni Taraf Se"	Alka Yagnik	Nadeem-Shravan	Sameer
Badmash No.1	1380	"Dil Mein Ho Tum"	Kavita Krishnamurti	Bappi Lahiri	
Dil Hai Tumhaara	1356	"Mohabbat Dil Ka Sakoon"	Udit Narayan, Alka Yagnik	Nadeem-Shravan	Sameer
Dil Hai Tumhaara	1357	"Dil Hai Tumhaara"		Nadeem-Shravan	Sameer
Dil Hai Tumhaara	1358	"Kasam Khake Kaho"		Nadeem-Shravan	Sameer
Dil Mein Basakar Dekho	1381	"Pehli Nazar Kar Gai"	Solo	Shyam Surender	
Dil Mein Basakar Dekho	1382	"Kisi Ki Lagi Is Dil Ko"	Solo	Shyam Surender	
Dil Vil Pyar Vyar	1374	"Yaadon Ki Baaraat"	Solo	Babloo Chakravorthy	Majrooh Sultanpuri
Dil Vil Pyar Vyar	1375	"Raat Kali Ek Khwab"		Babloo Chakravorthy	Majrooh Sultanpuri
Ghaav: The Wound	1392	"Aate Jaate Ye Hawa"			Sudhakar Sharma, Dev Kohli
Ghaav: The Wound	1393	"Kudiye Jawab Nahi"			
Haan Maine Bhi Pyaar Kiya	1354	"Hum Pyaar Hain Tumhare"	Alka Yagnik, Sarika Kapoor	Nadeem-Shravan	Sameer
Haan Maine Bhi Pyaar Kiya	1355	"Zindagi Ko Bina Pyaar"		Nadeem-Shravan	Sameer
Hum Tumhare Hain Sanam	1352	"Gale Mein Laal Taai"	Bela Sulakhe	Bappi Lahiri	Maya Govind
Humraaz	1353	"Sanam Mere Humraaz"	Alka Yagnik	Himesh Reshammiya	Sudhakar Sharma
Kaante	1351	"Dil Kya Kare"	Kavita Krishnamurthy	Anand Raj Anand	Dev Kohli
Karz: The Burden of Truth	1359	"So Gaayi Hai Zameen"	Alka Yagnik, Kavita Krishnamurthy, Abhijeet, Solo		
Karz: The Burden of Truth	1360	"Mohabbat Hui Hai"			
Karz: The Burden of Truth	1361	"Meri Mehbooba Hai"			
Karz: The Burden of Truth	1362	"Shaam Bhi Khoob Hai"			
Kehtaa Hai Dil Baar Baar	1387	"Jaane Kab Anjane"			Sameer
Kuch Tum Kaho Kuch Hum Kahein	1376	"Jab Se Dekha Tumko"	Alka Yagnik	Anu Malik	Sameer
Kya Yehi Pyaar Hai	1364	"Sochu Tumhe Abb Mai Rat Din"			
Kya Yehi Pyaar Hai	1363	"Tujhe Dekhakar Jitaa Hun Main"	Solo, Alka Yagnik, Sonu Nigam		
Kya Yehi Pyaar Hai	1365	"Dil Kee Najar Me"			
Maseeha	1390	"Subah Savere"			
Maseeha	1391	"Masoom Si Ek Larkee"			
Roshni	1394	"Chanda Ki Chandni"	Alka Yagnik	Anand-Milind	Ibrahim Ashq
Roshni	1395	"Jaanu O Meri Jaanu"		Anand-Milind	Ibrahim Ashq
Roshni	1396	"Maine Toh Aaj Yeh"		Anand-Milind	Ibrahim Ashq
Roshni	1397	"Zindagi Ke Suhane Haseen Mod Par"		Anand-Milind	Ibrahim Ashq
Soch	1388	"Yaadein Bani Parchaiyan"			Sameer
Soch	1389	"Yaadein Bani Parchaiyan (Sad)"			Sameer
Tum Se Achcha Kaun Hai	1377	"Aankh Hai Bhari Bhari (Male)"	Solo		
Tum Se Achcha Kaun Hai	1378	"Aankh Hai Bhari Bhari (Duet)"	Alka Yagnik		
Yeh Dil Aashiqana	1369	"Dhak Chik Dana"	Anuradha Paudwal, Alka Yagnik		
Yeh Dil Aashiqana	1370	"I Am in Love"			
Yeh Dil Aashiqana	1371	"Jab Se Main"			
Yeh Dil Aashiqana	1372	"Utha Le Jaoonga Tujhe Mai Doli"			
Yeh Dil Aashiqana	1373	"Yeh Dil Aashiquana"			
Yeh Hai Jalwa	1366	"Aankhen Pyari Hain"	Alka Yagnik, Shaan	Himesh Reshammiya	Sudhakar Sharma
Yeh Hai Jalwa	1367	"O Jaane Jigar"		Himesh Reshammiya	Sudhakar Sharma
Yeh Hai Jalwa	1368	"Carbon Copy (Duet)"		Himesh Reshammiya	Sudhakar Sharma
Yeh Kaisi Mohabbat	1386	"Yeh Kaisi Mohabbat"			Nitin Raikwar

=== 2003 ===
Film(s)	No.	Song name(s)	Co-singer(s)	Music director(s)	Lyricist(s)
Aanch	1430	"Lehron Se Khalen Hai Payal"	Alka Yagnik	Sanjeev Darshan	Afsar
Aisaa Kyon	1427	"Haul Haule Hum"	Alka Yagnik	Ram Laxman	
Andaaz	1398	"Kitna Pagal Dil Hai"	Solo, Alka Yagnik	Nadeem-Shravan	Sameer
Andaaz	1399	"Kisise Tum Pyar Karo"		Nadeem-Shravan	Sameer
Border Hindustan Ka	1429	"Yaad Aati Hai"	Vinod Rathod, Udit Narayan		
Chori Chori	1418	"Kahna Hai Aaj Tujhse"	Solo, Alka Yagnik	Sajid–Wajid	Anand Bakshi
Dil Ka Rishta	1405	"Dil Ka Rishta"	Udit Narayan, Alka Yagnik, Sapna Awasthi	Nadeem-Shravan	Sameer
Dil Ka Rishta	1406	"Kitna Majboor Ho Gaya Hu Main"		Nadeem-Shravan	Sameer
Dil Ka Rishta	1407	"Dil Chura"		Nadeem-Shravan	Sameer
Dil Ka Rishta	1408	"Hai Dil Mera Dil"		Nadeem-Shravan	Sameer
Dil Ka Rishta	1409	"Saajan Saajan"		Nadeem-Shravan	Sameer
Escape From Taliban	1428	"Jeete Hain Yahan"	Sneha Pant		
Footpath	1417	"Dosti Miltey Hai"	Solo	Nadeem-Shravan, Himesh Reshammiya	Sameer
Hungama	1403	"Ishq Jab Ek"	Solo		
Indian Babu	1423	"Mere Sang Sang"	Solo, Alka Yagnik, Sarika Kapoor, Nirja Pandit		
Indian Babu	1424	"Aap Humse Pyar Karne Lage"			
Indian Babu	1425	"Aaya Dulha Aaya"			
Indian Babu	1426	"Dil Mera Dil Mera Dil"			
Ishq Vishk	1410	"Aankhon Ne Tumhari"	Alka Yagnik, Alisha Chinai, Sonu Nigam		
Ishq Vishk	1411	"Chot Dil Pe Lagi"			
Ishq Vishk	1412	"Ishq Vishk Pyaar Vyaar"			
Ishq Vishk	1413	"Mujhpe Har Haseena"			
Jaal: The Trap	1414	"Pehla Pehla Pyar Ho Gaya"	Solo		
Khanjar: The Knife	1431	"Baali Umar Teri"	Solo		
Khel – No Ordinary Game	1415	"Pyar Hone Laga Hai"	Kavita Krishnamurthy		
Khel – No Ordinary Game	1416	"Moment Of Passion"			
Market	1419	"Hum Pyar Jo Tera"	Solo & Alka Yagnik		
Om	1420	"Meri Chahat Meri Har Khushi"	Alka Yagnik	Amar Mohile	Sameer
Qayamat: City Under Threat	1400	"Woh Ladki Bohat Yaad"	Solo, Alka Yagnik, Mahalakshmi Iyer	Nadeem-Shravan	Sameer
Qayamat: City Under Threat	1401	"Mujhe Tumse Muhabbat Hai"		Nadeem-Shravan	Sameer
Qayamat: City Under Threat	1402	"Woh Ladki Bohat Yaad (Sad)"		Nadeem-Shravan	Sameer
Talaash: The Hunt Begins...	1404	"Masoom Chehra"	Solo	Sanjeev Darshan	Sameer
Tumse Milke Wrong Number	1421	"Kal Hum Jis Se Mile The"	Anuradha Paudwal	Daboo Malik	Praveen Bharadwaj
Tumse Milke Wrong Number	1422	"Jab Tak Tum Samne"		Daboo Malik	Praveen Bharadwaj

=== 2004 ===
Film(s)	No.	Song name(s)	Co-Singer(s)	Music director(s)	Lyricist(s)
Aabra Ka Daabra	1447	"Zindagi Zindagi Lagti Hai Sath Tere"	Alka Yagnik		
Aan: Men at Work	1435	"Dil Se Dilbar"	Anuradha Paudwal	Anu Malik	Sameer
Ab... Bas!	1455	"Kabhi Bindiya Banke"	Anuradha Paudwal		
Aetbaar	1438	"Tum Mujhe Bas Yun Hi"	Madhushree	Rajesh Roshan	Nasir Faraaz
Charas	1452	"Sulge Huye Hain"	Alka Yagnik		
Ek Se Badhkar Ek	1443	"Aankhon Hi Aankhon Mein"	Sunidhi Chauhan	Anand Raj Anand	Majrooh Sultanpuri
Fida	1434	"Aaj Kaho Sanam Jitna Pyar Karu Tumhe Utna"	Alka Yagnik	Anu Malik	Sameer
Garv: Pride & Honour	1432	"Tere Hai Deewana Dil"	Anuradha Paudwal	Sajid–Wajid	Jalees Sherwani
Girlfriend	1442	"Tere Chehre Se"	Shreya Ghoshal		
Hatya	1462	"Yun Hafte Hafte Milna"	Alka Yagnik		
Hatya	1463	"Kitna Intezar Tera Aur"			
Hatya	1464	"Khabar Chhap Jayegi"			
Kaun Hai Jo Sapno Mein Aaya	1454	"Tere Chehre Pe Marta Hoon"	Anuradha Paudwal	Nikhil-Vinay	Sameer
Krishna Cottage	1441	"Aaju Mein Tum Khade The"	Alka Yagnik	Anu Malik	Sameer
Kuch Kaha Aapne	1453	"Kaise Badne Lagi"	Alka Yagnik	Sajid-Wajid	
Meri Biwi Ka Jawaab Nahin	1465	"Meri Biwi Ka Jawab Nahin"	Kavita Krishnamurthy	Laxmikant-Pyarelal	
Musafir	1433	"Phir Na Kehna"	Sunidhi Chauhan	Vishal–Shekhar	Dev Kohli
Plan	1436	"Kal Raat Se"	Shreya Ghoshal, Sunidhi Chauhan	Anand Raj Anand, Vishal–Shekhar	Praveen Bhardwaj
Plan	1437	"Hota Hai Hota Hai Pyar Hota Hai"			
Run	1439	"Tere Aane Se"	Alka Yagnik	Himesh Reshammiya	Sameer
Run	1440	"Bade Nazuk Daur Se"		Himesh Reshammiya	Sameer
Sheen	1450	"Tum Dua Karo"	Solo, Niraj Pandit	Nadeem-Shravan	Sameer
Sheen	1451	"Aao Jannat Mein"		Nadeem-Shravan	Sameer
Shukriya: Till Death Do Us Apart	1445	"Maine Poochha Kudrat Se"	Solo, Anuradha Paudwal	Vishal–Shekhar	Sameer
Shukriya: Till Death Do Us Apart	1446	"Dil Ai Dil"		Vishal–Shekhar	Sameer
Suno Sasurjee	1448	"Mera Dil Chura Ke"	Prabha, Alka Yagnik		
Suno Sasurjee	1449	"Jab Dil Dhadakta"			
Taarzan: The Wonder Car	1444	"Dil Se Juda Ahsas Tu Hai"	Alka Yagnik, Jayesh Gandhi	Himesh Reshammiya	Sameer
Tum?: A Dangerous Obsession	1456	"Rehna To Hai"	Alka Yagnik		
Yeh Lamhe Judaai Ke	1457	"Tera Naam Lene Ki"	Sadhana Sargam	Nikhil-Vinay	
Yeh Lamhe Judaai Ke	1458	"Ye Dil Hai Ya Sheesha"		Nikhil-Vinay	
Yeh Lamhe Judaai Ke	1459	"Yaadein Teri Yaadein"		Nikhil-Vinay	
Yeh Lamhe Judaai Ke	1460	"Yaadein Teri Yaadein (Sad)"		Nikhil-Vinay	
Yeh Lamhe Judaai Ke	1461	"Tum Paas Ho Jab Mere"	Asha Bhosle	Nikhil-Vinay	

=== 2005 ===
Film(s)	No.	Song name(s)	Co-singer(s)	Music director(s)	Lyricist(s)
Bachke Rehna Re Baba	1472	"Dil Churane Wale"	Alka Yagnik	Anu Malik	Dev Kohli
Barsaat	1469	"Barsaat Ke Din Aye"	Alka Yagnik	Nadeem-Shravan	Sameer
Bewafaa	1468	"Pyar Ka Anjam"	Alka Yagnik, Sapna Mukherjee	Nadeem-Shravan	Sameer
Chand Bujh Gaya	1482	"Chupke Chupke De Jaati Hai Pyar"	Solo, Pamela Jain	Ghani, Kanak Raj	Faaiz Anwar
Chand Bujh Gaya	1483	"Chand Bujh Gaya"			
Film Star	1479	"Khwabon Ki Ye Zameen Hai"	Solo	Jatin–Lalit	Sameer
Koi Mere Dil Mein Hai	1474	"Koi Mere Dil Mein Hai"	Anuradha Paudwal	Nikhil-Vinay	Faiz Anwar
Naam Gum Jaayega	1473	"Us Ladki Pe Dil Aaya Hai"	Anuradha Paudwal	Anand Milind	Praveen Bharadwaj
No Entry	1466	"Dil Paagal Hai"	Alka Yagnik, KK, Udit Narayan	Anu Malik	Sameer
No Entry	1467	"Kahan Ho Tum"		Anu Malik	Sameer
Pehchaan: The Face of Truth	1476	"Pal Hai Khushi"	Mahalakshmi Iyer	Daboo Malik	Praveen Bhardwaj
Saathi: The Companion	1477	"Yeh Chehara Yeh Rangat"	Solo, Shreya Ghoshal	Nikhil–Vinay	Faaiz Anwar
Saathi: The Companion	1478	"Tumko Ham Iss Kadar"		Nikhil–Vinay	Faaiz Anwar
Shabd	1470	"Lo Shuru Ab"	Sunidhi Chauhan	Vishal–Shekhar	Irshad Kamil
Sitam	1480	"Ho Sake To Mera Ek Kaam"	Solo	Nikhil-Vinay	Kamal
Ssukh	1481	"Aawajo Aawajo"	Solo	Kamini Khanna	Kamini Khanna
Vaada	1471	"Vaada Hai Ye"	Udit Narayan, Alka Yagnik	Himesh Reshamya	Sameer
Zameer: The Fire Within	1475	"Partdesi Pardesi"	Alka Yagnik, Sapna Awasthi	Jatin–Lalit, Nikhil-Vinay	Sameer

=== 2006 ===
Film(s)	No.	Song name(s)	Co-Singer(s)	Music director(s)	Lyricist(s)
Ankush: The Command	1488	"Choti Choti Kasmein"	Soma Banerjee	Madhu Bhosle	Deepak
Ankush: The Command	1489	"Deewana Dil Na Jaane"		Madhu Bhosle	Deepak
Chand Ke Paar Chalo	1491	"Iss Dil Ka Barosa Kya"	Shreya Ghoshal, Aftab Hasmi Sabri		
Charminar Boyz	1490	"Hamare Ishq Ka"	Madhushree	Aziz Khan	Aziz Khan
Humko Tumse Pyaar Hai	1486	"Humko Tumse Pyaar Hai"	Alka Yagnik, Anand Raj Anand	Anand Raj Anand	Dev Kohli
Humko Tumse Pyaar Hai	1487	"Chori Se Dil Ko"		Anand Raj Anand	Dev Kohli
Ishq Na Karna	1495	"O Jaanam O Jaanam"	Shreya Ghoshal	Nazakat Shujat	
Ishq Na Karna	1496	"Meri Har Subah Ek Shaam"		Nazakat Shujat	
Krishna	1493	"Makhan Koi"	Sunidhi Chauhan		
Krishna	1494	"Makhan Koi (Part 2)"	Sunidhi Chauhan		
Manoranjan: The Entertainment	1492	"Saans Chalti Rahe To"	Alka Yagnik	Nayab Raja	Zahir Anwar
Mere Jeevan Saathi	1485	"Tumko Dulhan Banayenge"	Sadhana Sargam	Nadeem-Shravan	Sameer
Tirupati Shree Balaji	1500	"Aaja Aaja Priyatama"	Sadhana Sargam	M.M Kareem	Dr. D.K Doyel
Tirupati Shree Balaji	1501	"Moti Chupaye Hue Hain"		M.M Kareem	Dr. D.K Doyel
Utthaan	1497	"Abb Neend Kisse"	Alka Yagnik, Kumar Sanu	Kumar Sanu	
Utthaan	1498	"Abb Neend Kisse (Remix)"		Kumar Sanu	
Utthaan	1499	"Abhi Tum Ho Kamsin"		Kumar Sanu	
Vivah	1484	"Kal Jisne Janam Yahan Paaya"	Suresh Wadkar, Ravindra Jain	Ravindra Jain	Ravindra Jain

=== 2007 ===
Film(s)	No.	Song name(s)	Co-singer(s)	Music director(s)'	Lyricist(s)
Dosh	1504	"Dil To Pagal Hai"	Solo	Manoj-Gajendra, Paresh Parikh	Naqsh Lyallpuri
Dosh	1505	"Yeh Kaisi Bebasi"			
Humraah	1503	"Hai Roshni Apki"	R.Pandit	R.K Pandit	K.P.Singh, Ramesh Shyar
Tathagatha Buddha	1502	"Raj Mahal Sunsan Pada Hai"	Solo	Shashi Pritam	Dr. D. k. Goyal

=== 2008 ===
Film(s)	No.	Song name(s)	Co-singer(s)	Music director(s)'	Lyricist(s)
Dil Mile Na Mile	1517	"Oh Mere Humrahi"	Solo	Palash Choudhari	Virender Dahiya
Gumnaam – The Mystery	1506	"Naa Hone Denge"	Alka Yagnik	Nadeem-Shravan	Sameer
Humsey Hai Jahaan	1510	"Hum Lakh Chhupayein"	Sunidhi Chauhan	Suhas, Abuzar Rizvi	Kumaar
Ishaara – A Dangerous Mission	1511	"Karle Tu Pyar Yar"	Shreya Ghoshal	Dilip Sen Sameer Sen	Ibrahim Ashk
Jeena To Hai	1515	"Kitni Hansi Zindagi Hai"	Pritha Majumdar	Utsav Anand	Naskar N
Jeena To Hai	1516	"Madhosh Ho Rahi Hai"		Utsav Anand	Naskar N
Meri Taaqat	1512	"Tara Chamakta Tara"	Sunitha		
Pehli Nazar Ka Pyaar	1508	"Dil Ki Betabiyon Ko"	Shreya Ghoshal	Ali-Ghani	Shakeel Azmi, Nawab Arzoo
Pehli Nazar Ka Pyaar	1509	"Kya Ho Raha Hai"	Shreya Ghoshal	Ali-Ghani	
Umeed-The Hope	1513	"Jeevan Ka Safar"	Solo	Ravindra Jain	
Umeed-The Hope	1514	"Dost Hamare"	Solo	Ravindra Jain	
Wafa	1507	"Tere Bagahair Ye Dil"	Pronali	Ravi Pawar - Sayed Ahmed	Sahb Ilhabadi

=== 2009 ===
Film(s)	No.	Song name(s)	Co-singer(s)	Music director(s)'	Lyricist(s)
Darwaza	1524	"Koi Use Itna Bata De"	Solo, Sangeet Haldipur	Ghulam Ali	Sameer
Darwaza	1525	"Lakhan Ki Chori"		Ghulam Ali	Sameer
Raftaar: An Obsession	1526	"Rooth Jaana"	Solo	Nitin Raikwar	Rashid Ferozabadi
Sanam Teri Kasam	1518	"Itna Bhi Na Chaho Mujhe"	Alka Yagnik, Pankaj Udhas, Sunanda, Poornima	Nadeem-Shravan	Sameer
Sanam Teri Kasam	1519	"Sanam Yeh Pyaar Hi To Hai"		Nadeem-Shravan	Sameer
Sanam Teri Kasam	1520	"Main Dil Ki Dil Mein"		Nadeem-Shravan	Sameer
Sanam Teri Kasam	1521	"Ek Baar Ek Baar Pyaar Se"		Nadeem-Shravan	Sameer
Sanam Teri Kasam	1522	"Tum Gwahi Do"		Nadeem-Shravan	Sameer
Sanam Teri Kasam	1523	"Main Pyar Tumse"		Nadeem-Shravan	Sameer

== 2010s ==
=== 2010 ===
Film(s)	No.	Song name(s)	Co-singer(s)	Music director(s)	Lyricist(s)
My Husband's Wife	1527	"Saanso Mein Teri"	Sadhana Sargam	Dinesh Arjuna	Vinod Arjuna
Ye Sunday Kyun Aata Hai	1528	"Rang Dharti Ke Liye"	Solo	Kumar Sanu	Sahil Sultanpuri, Sameer Anjaan
Ye Sunday Kyun Aata Hai	1529	"Jisne Sapna Dekha"	Solo	Kumar Sanu	Sahil Sultanpuri
Ye Sunday Kyun Aata Hai	1530	"Dagadu Dada Zindabaad"	Solo	Kumar Sanu	Sahil Sultanpuri

=== 2011 ===
Film(s)	No.	Song name(s)	Co-singer(s)	Music director(s)	Lyricist(s)
Ek Hi Raasta	1533	"Nazrein Mila Le Chori Chori"	Anuradha Paudwal	Mani Sharma	Anwar Sagar
Suraj Barsay Phool	1532	"Waada Ho Gaya Pyar Ka"	Sneha Pant	Chakoo Khan Lehri	
Who's There	1531	"Sili Sili Sargoshi Mein"	Solo	Dhinu	Dhinu

=== 2012 ===
Film(s)	No.	Song name(s)	Co-singer(s)	Music director(s)	Lyricist(s)
Rowdy Rathore	1534	"Chamak Challo Chel Chabeli"	Shreya Ghoshal	Sajid–Wajid	Faiz Anwar
Zindagi Ban Gaye Ho Tum	1535	"Rabba Maula Mahiya"	Solo	Dheeraj Sen	

=== 2013 ===
Film(s)	No.	Song name(s)	Co-singer(s)	Music director(s)	Lyricist(s)
Bin Phere Free Me Ttere	1543	"Tum Se Pyar Kiya Hai"	Pamela Jain	Vishnu Narayan	Rishi Azad
Bombay Talkies	1536	"Apna Bombay Talkies"	Udit Narayan, Alka Yagnik, Shreya Ghoshal, Sonu Nigam, Shaan, Sunidhi Chauhan, Abhijeet, Kavita Krishnamurthy, S. P. Balasubrahmanyam, KK, Sukhwinder Singh, Shilpa Rao, Mohit Chauhan, Sadhana Sargam	Amit Trivedi	Swanand Kirkire
Can't Say Forget Me	1540	"Main Hoon Meri Tanhayi"	Solo	Aarv	Sanjeev K. Chaturvedi
Hum To Chale Pardes	1537	"Ho Jati Hai Jisse Mohabbat"	Solo	Pankaj Bhatt	Raju Tank
Hum To Chale Pardes	1538	"Saajan Ka Sandes Liye"	Solo	Pankaj Bhatt	Raju Tank
Koi Hai Apna	1544	"Guzar Jayenge Din"	Sadhana Sargam	Satish Dehra	Harsukh Dhayal
Mere Sainath (Unreleased)	1539	"Jaana O Meri Jaana"	Sadhana Sargam	Dilip Sen	M Prakash
Murder Plan	1541	"Kitni Mohabbat Hai Tumse"	Alka Yagnik		
Na Jao Humdum	1545	"Pakdo Pakdo Chorni Ko"	Kavita Krishnamurthy		
Yahi To Pyar Hai	1542	"Maa Akeli"	Solo	Suraj Dev Sahu	Suraj Dev Sahu

=== 2014 ===
Film(s)	No.	Song name(s)	Co-singer(s)	Music director(s)	Lyricist(s)
Anna Ka Andolan	1547	"Tum Se Mil Ke"	Juhi Deshmukh	Baba Jagirdar	Dinesh Parihar
Darr Ke Aage Jeet Hai	1550	"Shokh Ishare"	Kavita Krishnamurthy	Nikhil Kamath	Suren Akolkar
Darr Ke Aage Jeet Hai	1551	"Jab Dil Machhal Jata Hai"		Nikhil Kamath	Suren Akolkar
Khoon Ka Nasha	1549	"Meri Jaan itna Pareshan Kyun Hai"	Solo	S.P Sen	Irshad Ahmad
Naari Teri Shakti Anokhi	1548	"Chunri Lehrai Hai"	Alka Yagnik	Ravindra Jain	Sudhakar Sharma
Needar the Fearless	1546	"Main Hoon Needer"	Solo	Dilip Chauikar, Raj Hans	

=== 2015 ===
Film(s)	No.	Song name(s)	Co-singer(s)	Music director(s)	Lyricist(s)
2 Chehre	1559	"Shadi Ke Baad"	Poornima	Sameer	Anand Milind
Bhooton Ki Raas Leela	1555	"Neend Aati Thi Chain Aata Tha"	Kavita Krishnamurthy	Munni Raaj	
Dum Laga Ke Haisha	1552	"Tu"	Solo	Anu Malik	Varun Grover
Dum Laga Ke Haisha	1553	"Dard Karaara"	Sadhana Sargam	Anu Malik	Varun Grover
Lateef (film)	1556	"Dekhe The Kitne Sapne"	Solo	Gunwant Sen, Iqbaal Sargam	Ashraf Faridi
Ye Kaisi Bekarari	1557	"Rimjhim Barasta Sawan"	Chandana Dixit	Akashraj	
Ye Kaisi Bekarari	1558	"Ye Parbaton Ki Wadiyan"		Akashraj	
Zamana Mera Hai	1554	Tere Chehre Mein Dikhti Hai		Manik Dada	Vishwajeet Rajput

=== 2016 ===
Film(s)	No.	Song name(s)	Co-singer(s)	Music director(s)	Lyricist(s)
Amir Salman Shahrukh	1561	"Jabse Dekha Maine Tumko"	Lalitya Munshaw	Laxmi Narayan	Laxmi Narayan
Real Champion	1560	"Parayi Nahin Pariyan Hoti Hain"	Solo	S.P Sen	Ashok Bhapna

=== 2017 ===
Film(s)	No.	Song name(s)	Co-singer(s)	Music director(s)	Lyricist(s)
Aparichit Shakti	1568	"Ye Nigahein Lab Nasheele"	Kumar Sanu	Dheraj Sen	Dheraj Sen
Kutumb The Family	1565	"Ye Kutumb"	Aryan Jain, Aishwarya	Aryan Jain	Amit Shre
Kutumb The Family	1566	"Ye Kutumb Sad Version"		Aryan Jain	Amit Shre
Meri Aankhon Mein Tum	1562	"Saathire Saathire"	Solo	Surya Kumar	
Meri Aankhon Mein Tum	1563	"Na Guzre Ye Din"	Solo	Surya Kumar	
Mridang	1567	"O Mere Sanam"	Raina Laheri	Chunmun Pandit	Navin S.Mishra
Mujhe Bhi Ye Duniya Dekhni Hai	1570	"Band Hai Darwaja"	Kumar Sanu	Shrihari Vaze	Satyaprakash Mangtani
Rambhajjan Zindabaad	1564	"Launda Ab Hero Hai"	Solo	Siddhant Mishra, Repul Sharma	
The Forest	1569	"Dard Gayab Hua Dard Se"	Keka Khoshal	Vijay Verma	Shakeel Azmi

=== 2018 ===
Film(s)	No.	Song name(s)	Co-singer(s)	Music director(s)	Lyricist(s)
Paagal Kar Diya Toone	1575	"Tum Jo Mere Paas Ho"	Sadhana Sargam	Sameer Sen	Suresh Suhani
Ramnagar UP 65	1573	"Gul Kahoon Ya Gulbadan"	Sadhana Sargam	Dilip Sen	MPrakash
Simmba	1571	"Aankh Maarey"	Neha Kakkar, Mika Singh	Tanishk Bagchi	Anand Bakshi
Wo India Ka Shakespeare	1572	"Awaaz Do"	Solo	Sachin Pathak	Suresh Mandal
Young Bikers	1574	"Sach Tum Sach Ho"	Kumar Sanu	Vyapak Joshi	Amit Vkapoor

=== 2019 ===
Film(s)	No.	Song name(s)	Co-singer(s)	Music director(s)	Lyricist(s)
Chase No Mercy To Crime	1583	"Har Khushi"	Sanchari Laha	Pinaki Bose	Sudhakar Sharma
Gho Gho Rani	1576	"Title Song"	Solo & Sadhana Sargam	Dilip Sen	
Gho Gho Rani	1577	"Ankhiyan Na Maaro"		Dilip Sen	
Gho Gho Rani	1578	"Bhola Bhala Dil Ka"		Dilip Sen	
Haseena No.1	1579	"Hum Tum Razi Honge"	Anjana Mehrishi	M.Mathews	Zahid Khan
Haseena No.1	1580	"Dekhi Jitni Haseena"		M.Mathews	Zahid Khan
Hum To Hue Hain Tumhare	1586	"Title Song"	Pamela Jain	Avinash Pathak	Sushil Kumar
Nidaan	1582	"Tum Saath Hamre Ho"	Rinko Banerjee	Vishwajeet	Ekhlas
Rab Ki Kasam	1585	"Koi Tumsa Nahin Hai"	Khushboo Jain	Manoj Mohit, Anuj Tiwari	Manoj Mohit, Birju Pal
Shaheed Chandra Shekhar Azaad	1584	"Pandit Ji Mera Hath"	Indra Naik	Dinesh Arjuna	Nayyer Jaupuri
Taxi Driver	1587	"Chaha Tujhe O Sanam"	Bateithymmai Nongrum	Dilip Dutta	Khrawbok Sohkhlet
Tere Ghar Mein Ganga Behti Hai	1581	"Bhala Ho Tera Nend Se Humein Jagane Wale"	Solo	Shivram	Ravi Chaupara

== 2020s ==
=== 2020 ===
Film(s)	Song name(s)	Co-singer(s)	Music director(s)	Lyricist(s)	
Coolie No. 1	1590	"Mirchi Lagi Toh"	Alka Yagnik	Lijo George – DJ Chetas	Sameer Anjaan
Godjee Sermoniser Of Geeta	1588	"Kabhi Dil Se"	Sadhana Sargam	Murlidhar Rao	Nida Fazli
Ladli Betiyan	1591	"Sard Bhara Yeh Mausam"	Vaishali Made	Vaishnav Deva	B.S Jogdand
Yaar Ki Ibaadat	1589	"Mehka Mehka Hai Badan"	Solo, Annie Chatterjee	Surinder Manhaas	Bishan Singh Dardi

=== 2021 ===
Film(s)	No.	Song name(s)	Co-singer(s)	Music director(s)	Lyricist(s)
Social Mandiya	1592	"Silsila"	Solo	The Lost Symbols	Vivek Sharma

=== 2022 ===
Film(s)	No.	Song name(s)	Co-singer(s)	Music director(s)	Lyricist(s)
Chattan	1594	"Jaane Kaise Tumse Hogaya Hai Pyar"	Priya Bhattacharya & Solo	Sudeep Mukherjee	Sudeep Mukherjee
Chattan	1595	"Tere Liye Dil Ke Diye"		Sudeep Mukherjee	Sudeep Mukherjee
Dedh Lakh Ka Dulha	1597	"O Mere Dilbar"	Solo	Sahajahn Shaikh	Abhay Singh
Khalli Balli	1596	"Tum Ho To Main Hoon"	Solo	Poonam Thakur	Shabbir Ahmed
Vaardaat	1593	Khwabon Mein Khayalo Mein"	Chorus	Krishna Mohan	Salim Bijnori

=== 2023 ===
Film(s)	No.	Song name(s)	Co-singer(s)	Music director(s)	Lyricist(s)
Chal Zindagi	1598	"Mujhe Jeena Aagya"	Shannon K	The Lost Symbols	Vivek Sharma
Guns & Gulaabs	1599	"Do Raazi"	Solo	Aman Pant	Akhil Tiwari

=== 2024 ===
Film(s)	No.	Song name(s)	Co-singer(s)	Music director(s)	Lyricist(s)
Tribhuvan Mishra CA Topper	1600	"Sweekar Kar Lena"	Chaandni	Ram Sampath	Puneet Krishna
Vicky Vidya Ka Woh Wala Video	1601	"Tumhe Apna Banane Ki" (90s Revisited)	Anuradha Paudwal	Nadeem–Shravan White Noise Collectives	Sameer Anjaan, Surendra Sathi, Rani Mallik

=== 2026 ===
Film(s)	No.	Song name(s)	Co-singer(s)	Music director(s)	Lyricist(s)
Brilliant Idea	1602	"Ek Sadak Pe Aaya"	Solo	Chander Mohan	Rajesh Parasher
Suryaa	1603	"Suniyo Zara"	Udit Narayan, Anupam Amod	Rahee	Priya Saraiya

== See also ==
- List of Hindi songs recorded by Udit Narayan
- Bollywood selected discography of Udit Narayan
- Abhijeet Bhattacharya Discography
- Sonu Nigam discography
- List of songs recorded by Amit Kumar
- List of songs recorded by Kishore Kumar
