= List of Hindi films of 1997 =

This is a list of films produced by the Bollywood film industry based in Mumbai in 1997.

== Top-grossing films ==
No.	Title	Director	Producer	Worldwide gross
1.	Border	JP Dutta	JP Dutta	₹65.57 crore (US$18.05 million)
2.	Dil To Pagal Hai	Yash Chopra	Yash Raj Films	₹58.61 crore (US$16.14 million)
3	Ishq	Indra Kumar	Baba Films	₹45.61 crore (US$12.56 million)
4	Pardes	Subhash Ghai	Mukta Arts	₹40.95 crore (US$11.27 million)
5	Gupt: The Hidden Truth	Rajiv Rai	Trimurti Films	₹33.23 crore (US$9.15 million)
6	Ziddi	Guddu Dhanoa	Ratan International	₹32.43 crore (US$8.93 million)
7	Hero No. 1	David Dhawan	Pooja Entertainment	₹30.95 crore (US$8.52 million)
8	Judaai	Raj Kanwar	Filmkrafts Pvt. Ltd.	₹30.05 crore (US$8.27 million)
9	Koyla	Rakesh Roshan	Eros International	₹25.04 crore (US$6.89 million)
10	Deewana Mastana	David Dhawan	MKD Films	₹24.33 crore (US$6.7 million)
11	Judwaa	David Dhawan	Sajid Nadiadwala	₹24.28 crore (US$6.69 million)
12	Yes Boss	Aziz Mirza	Ratan Jain, Champak Jain	₹23 crore (US$6.33 million)
13	Virasat	Priyadarshan	Mushir-Riaz	₹20.73 crore (US$5.71 million)
14	Yeshwant	Anil Mattoo	Narottam V. Purohit, Vijay K. Ranglani	₹19.10 crore (US$5.26 million)
15	Mrityudata	Mehul Kumar	Amitabh Bachchan ABCL	₹17.37 crore (US$4.78 million)

== 1997 ==
Title	Director	Cast	Genre
Aakhri Sanghursh	Narendra Bedi	Vijayendra Ghatge, Kajal Kiran	Action
Aar Ya Paar	Ketan Mehta	Jackie Shroff, Deepa Sahi	Romance, crime
Aastha: In the Prison of Spring	Basu Bhattacharya	Rekha, Om Puri	Drama
Abhaas	Bijaya Jena	Bijaya Jena, Murali, Akshay Anand	Drama
Aflatoon	Guddu Dhanoa	Akshay Kumar, Urmila Matondkar, Anupam Kher	Action
Agnee Morcha	Raju Chauhan	Dharmendra, Ravi Kishan, Mukesh Khanna	Action
Agnichakra	Amit Suryavanshi	Naseeruddin Shah, Govinda, Dimple Kapadia, Somy Ali	Action
Ankhon Mein Tum Ho	Ashim Samanta	Sharad Kapoor, Suman Ranganathan, Rohit Roy	Drama
Aur Pyaar Ho Gaya	Rahul Rawail	Bobby Deol, Aishwarya Rai, Shammi Kapoor	Romance
Auzaar	Sohail Khan	Salman Khan, Shilpa Shetty, Sanjay Kapoor, Johnny Lever	Action
Banarasi Babu	David Dhawan	Govinda, Ramya, Kader Khan	Comedy
Betaabi	Rajesh Kumar Singh	Chandrachur Singh, Arshad Warsi, Anjala Zaveri	
Bhai	Deepak Shivdasani	Sunil Shetty, Sonali Bendre, Pooja Batra	Action
Bhai Bhai	Sikander Bharti	Samrat Mukerji, Manek Bedi, Shakti Kapoor	Action
Bhayaanak Panja	R. Mittal	Gajendra Chauhan, Anil Dhawan, Menaka	Horror
Border	J. P. Dutta	Sunny Deol, Sunil Shetty, Jackie Shroff, Tabu, Akshaye Khanna, Pooja Bhatt, Raakhee Gulzar	War
Chachi 420	Kamal Haasan	Kamal Haasan, Tabu, Amrish Puri, Om Puri, Ayesha Jhulka	Comedy
Char Adhyay	Kumar Shakami	Sumanto Chattopadhyay, Nandini Ghosal	Drama
Chupp	Ambrish Sangal	Jeetendra, Somy Ali, Om Puri	Thriller
Daadagiri	Arshad Khan	Mithun Chakraborty, Ayub Khan	Action
Daava	Sunil Agnihotri	Akshay Kumar, Raveena Tandon, Divya Dutta	Action, comedy, romance
Dance of the Wind	Rajan Khosa	Kitu Gidwani, Bhaveen Ghosain	Drama
Darmiyaan	Kalpana Lajmi	Kiron Kher, Tabu	Drama
Daud	Ram Gopal Varma	Sanjay Dutt, Urmila Matondkar, Manoj Bajpai, Paresh Rawal, Neeraj Vohra	Romance, crime
Deewana Mastana	David Dhawan	Anil Kapoor, Govinda, Juhi Chawla, Anupam Kher, Johnny Lever	Romance, comedy
Dil Ke Jharoke Main	Ashim Bhattacharya	Manisha Koirala, Vikas Bhalla	Romance
Dil Kitna Nadan Hai	Ravi Rai	Raja Bherwani, Raageshwari Loomba, Alok Nath, Kiran Kumar	Romance, drama
Dil To Pagal Hai	Yash Chopra	Shahrukh Khan, Madhuri Dixit, Karisma Kapoor, Akshay Kumar	Drama, romance, musical, comedy
Dhaal	Sameer Malkan	Vinod Khanna, Sunil Shetty, Gautami	Action
Do Ankhen Barah Hath	Kirti Kumar	Govinda, Madhuvanti	Action
Ek Phool Teen Kante	Anup Malik	Vikas Bhalla, Monica Bedi	Comedy
Ghoonghat	Chinni Prakash	Inder Kumar, Ayesha Jhulka	Action, drama, romance
Ghulam-E-Mustafa	Partho Ghosh	Nana Patekar, Raveena Tandon, Paresh Rawal	Action, crime, drama
Gudgudee	Basu Chatterjee	Anupam Kher, Jugal Hansraj, Pratibha Sinha	Musical, romance
Gudia	Gautam Ghose	Gautam Ghose, Pran	Drama
Gundagardi	V. Sai Prasad	Aditya Pancholi, Raj Babbar, Dharmendra	Action
Gupt: The Hidden Truth	Rajiv Rai	Bobby Deol, Manisha Koirala, Kajol, Raj Babbar, Prem Chopra	Thriller
Hameshaa	Sanjay Gupta	Aditya Pancholi, Saif Ali Khan, Kajol	Drama
Hero No. 1	David Dhawan	Govinda, Karisma Kapoor, Kader Khan	Comedy
Himalay Putra	Pankaj Parashar	Vinod Khanna, Akshaye Khanna, Hema Malini, Anjala Zhaveri	Drama, romance
Insaaf	Dayal Nihalani	Akshay Kumar, Shilpa Shetty, Paresh Rawal	Action
Ishq	Indra Kumar	Aamir Khan, Juhi Chawla, Ajay Devgn, Kajol, Deven Verma	Romance, comedy
Itihaas	Raj Kanwar	Ajay Devgn, Twinkle Khanna	Romance
Jeeo Shaan Se	Talat Jani	Dharmendra, Reena Roy, Vikas Bhalla	College drama
Jeevan Yudh	Partho Ghosh	Mithun Chakraborty, Atul Agnihotri, Mamta Kulkarni	Action, drama, family
Jodidar	T. L. V. Prasad	Bindushree, Mithun Chakraborty, Prem Chopra	Action
Judaai	Raj Kanwar	Anil Kapoor, Sridevi, Johnny Lever, Urmila Matondkar	Drama
Judge Mujrim	A. Sharma	Jeetendra, Sunil Shetty, Sujata Mehta	Action
Judwaa	David Dhawan	Salman Khan, Rambha, Karisma Kapoor, Kader Khan	Comedy
Kaal Sandhya	Bhabendra Nath Saikia	Jatin Bora, Ashish Vidyarthi, Debashree Roy	Drama
Kaalia	T. L. V. Prasad	Dipti Bhatnagar, Mithun Chakraborty, Kiran Kumar	Action
Kaun Rokega Mujhe	Kamal Raj Basin	Govinda, Prem Chopra, Nagma, Pran	Action thriller
Kaun Sachcha Kaun Jhootha	Partho Ghosh	Rishi Kapoor, Sridevi, Suresh Oberoi	Action, drama, thriller
Kamsin: The Untouched	Amit Suryavanshi	Disha Vakani, Shiva Rindani	Drama
Koi Kisise Kum Nahin	Raj N. Sippy	Shalini Kapoor, Ravi Kishan, Rohit Roy	
Koyla	Rakesh Roshan	Shahrukh Khan, Madhuri Dixit, Mohnish Bahl, Amrish Puri, Johnny Lever, Jack Gaud	Drama
Krishna Arjun	Shailendra Shukla	Jeetendra, Vivek Mushran, Karina Grover, Upasana Singh, Ashutosh Rana, Johnny Lever	Action
Lahu Ke Do Rang	Mehul Kumar	Akshay Kumar, Karisma Kapoor, Navin Nischol, Naseeruddin Shah, Mahesh Anand, Farah Naaz	Action, drama
Lav Kush	V. Madhusudan Rao	Pran	Mythological
Loha	Kanti Shah	Dharmendra, Mithun Chakraborty, Govinda, Ramya	Action
Mahaanta	Afzal Khan	Sanjay Dutt, Madhuri Dixit	Action, drama
Mere Sapno Ki Rani	K. Raghavendra Rao	Sanjay Kapoor, Madhoo, Urmila Matondkar, Asrani, Rakesh Bedi, Laxmikant Berde	Drama, musical, romance
Mohabbat	Reema Nath	Madhuri Dixit, Sanjay Kapoor, Akshaye Khanna	Romance
Mr. and Mrs. Khiladi	David Dhawan	Akshay Kumar, Juhi Chawla	Romantic comedy
Mrityudand	Prakash Jha	Madhuri Dixit, Shabana Azmi, Ayub Khan, Shilpa Shirodkar, Om Puri	Drama
Mrityudata	Mehul Kumar	Amitabh Bachchan, Nana Patekar, Dimple Kapadia, Karisma Kapoor, Pran	Action
Naseeb	Kirti Kumar	Govinda, Mamta Kulkarni	Drama
Nirnayak	Anil Wasia	Kamal Sadanah, Indrani Banerjee, Rakesh Bedi, Om Puri	Drama
Pardes	Subhash Ghai	Shah Rukh Khan, Mahima Chaudhry, Aditya Narayan, Apurva Agnihotri, Amrish Puri	Social Drama
Prithvi	Nitin Manmohan	Sunil Shetty, Shilpa Shetty	Mystery
Qahar	Rajkumar Kohli	Sunny Deol, Sunil Shetty, Sonali Bendre	Action
Rui Ka Bojh	Subhash Agarwal	Pankaj Kapoor, Reema Lagoo, Raghubir Yadav	Drama
Salma Pe Dil Aa Gaya	Saawan Kumar Tak	Ayub Khan, Milind Gunaji, Saadhika, Pran	Drama
Sanam	Aziz Sejawal	Sanjay Dutt, Manisha Koirala	Romance
Shapath	Rajiv Babbar	Mithun Chakraborty, Jackie Shroff, Harish Kumar, Ramya	Action
Share Bazaar	Manmohan	Jackie Shroff, Ravi Kishan, Dimple Kapadia	Drama
Sixth Happiness	Waris Hussein	Firdaus Kanga, Souad Faress, Khodus Wadia	Social
Suraj	T. L. V. Prasad	Rakesh Bedi, Mithun Chakraborty, Puneet Issar	Action
Tamanna	Mahesh Bhatt	Paresh Rawal, Pooja Bhatt, Sharad Kapoor, Manoj Bajpayee	Drama
Tarazu	Vimal Kumar	Akshay Kumar, Sonali Bendre	Action
Tunnu Ki Tina	Paresh Kamdar	Sunil Barve, Rajeshwari Sachdev	Comedy, drama
Udaan	Asrani	Rekha, Saif Ali Khan, Prem Chopra	Drama
Uff! Yeh Mohabbat	Vipin Handa	Abhishek Kapoor, Twinkle Khanna, Anupam Kher	Romance
Virasat	Priyadarshan	Anil Kapoor, Tabu, Pooja Batra, Amrish Puri	Drama
Vishwavidhaata	Farogh Siddique	Jackie Shroff, Ayesha Jhulka, Sharad Kapoor, Pooja Batra	Drama
Yes Boss	Aziz Mirza	Aditya Pancholi, Shahrukh Khan, Juhi Chawla, Gulshan Grover	Comedy, romance
Yeshwant	Anil Matto	Nana Patekar, Madhoo, Atul Agnihotri, Mohan Joshi, Shafi Inamdar	Social
Zameer: The Awakening of a Soul	Rajat Rawail	Sanjay Kapoor, Shilpa Shetty, Paresh Rawal	Drama
Ziddi	Guddu Dhanoa	Sunny Deol, Raveena Tandon	Action, drama

== See also ==
- List of Hindi films of 1998
- List of Hindi films of 1996
