= Vikas Bhalla =

Indian actor and singer (born 1972)

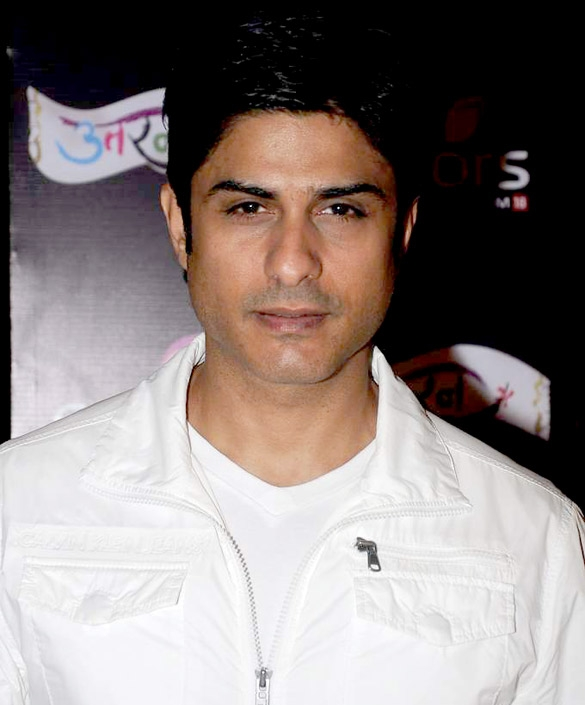
- Bhalla in 2015
- Born: 24 October 1972 (age 53); Bombay, Maharashtra, India
- Education: Narsee Monjee College
- Occupations: Actor, singer, film producer, entrepreneur, digital content creator
- Years active: 1995–2019
- Spouse: Punita Chopra (m. 1996)
- Children: Sanchi Bhalla (daughter); Veer Bhalla (son)
- Relatives: Prem Chopra (father-in-Law); Sharman Joshi (Co-Brother)

Vikas Bhalla pronounced [ʋɪkaːs bʱəlla] (born 24 October 1972) is an Indian film, television actor, singer and producer. Vikas is trained in Hindustani classical music from Allahabad University, under Pandit Jialal Vasant. He appeared as a lead actor in films in the early 90s, and went on to feature in several music and video albums. In 1995, Bhalla made his film debut in Ramesh Modi's Sauda, in which he played the lead role of Deepak, opposite Neelam. The film was inspired by the Hollywood blockbuster Indecent Proposal.

In 2001, Bhalla made his television debut with Apne Paray, where he played the role of veteran actor Rajesh Khanna's son. After that, he acted in many serials, including Tum Bin Jaaoon Kahaan, Karishma - The Miracles of Destiny, Jassi Jaissi Koi Nahin, Shanno Ki Shaadi and Uttaran. Bhalla also worked in Zee TV's singing reality show Star Ya Rockstar.

Alongside his acting career, Bhalla also pursued his career in singing and launched the albums Hai Dhuan, Awaara and Mehek Teri. His chart buster track "Hai Dhuan" from his debut album Dhuan got wide acceptance and made him a popular and prominent singer. In 2007, Bhalla gave his first playback voice for the song "Paagal Si Saari Leheren" from the movie Marigold. Thereafter, he came into prominence for being the playback voice for the super hit song "Po Po", featuring Salman Khan, Ajay Devgn and Sanjay Dutt, from the blockbuster 2012 movie Son Of Sardar.

In addition to his acting and singing career, Bhalla owns a production company, Rat Race Entertainment, which was established in 2008 and also director and co-founder of IndoWest Films, which was established in 2013. He was a contestant in the ninth season of Colors TV's Indian game reality show Bigg Boss 9.

== Early life, education and family ==
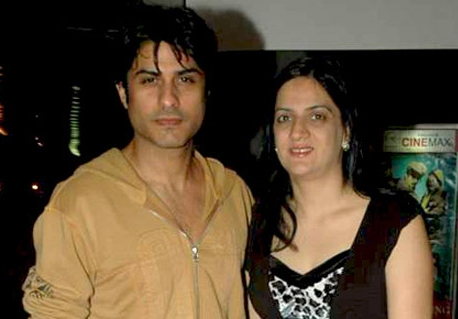
Bhalla with wife at the screening of film No Problem

Bhalla was born on 24 October 1972 into a Punjabi family to Neelam Bhalla. He has one younger sister, Pooja Kalra, who is married. Bhalla shifted to Mumbai when he was a child. He has completed his studies from Bombay Scottish School and graduated in B.Com. from Narsee Monjee College, Mumbai. He trained in Hindustani classical music from Allahabad University, under Pandit Jialal Vasant at the age of nine and began training under Guru Iqbal Gill in 1985, when he was thirteen.

Bhalla began dating Punita, the daughter of veteran actor, Prem Chopra, since 1986, while they were studying high school education. He married her at the age of 24 on 10 October 1996 and the couple have two children, Sanchi and Veer.

Apart from being an actor and singer, Bhalla has a production company, Rat Race Entertainment, which was established in 2008 and director and co-founder of IndoWest Films. He is also an educationist and runs a school in Bandra with his wife and mother.

== Acting career ==
=== Film career ===
Bhalla made his film debut with the 1995 Ramesh Modi's Sauda, in which he played the lead role of Deepak, opposite Neelam. Later, in the same year, he worked in another romantic crime film Taaqat, where he portrayed the role of veteran actor Dharmendra's younger brother Aklakh, opposite Kajol.

Bhalla worked in three different films in 1997, his first released Jeeo Shaan Se, directed by "Talat Jani" starred Dharmendra and Reena Roy, where he played the role of Kishan, opposite Sakshi Shivanand. It is the story of three friends Gopala (Ayub Khan), Kishan (Himself) and Jay Mehta (Govinda). Kishan and Jay believe in sexual promiscuity and crave to have sex with a new girl every day while Gopala is a simpleton. They take pride in their manliness with the slogan "Jeeo Shaan Se". The next release being the Bollywood musical romance film Dil Ke Jharoke Main, in which he portrayed the male lead role of Vijay Rai opposite Manisha Koirala. The story is about the two lovebirds, Suman and Vijay Rai, who are two virtually inseparable school-going children. Both are heart-broken when Suman's dad decides to move out to a new location, both have tattooed a "heart" on their arms and hope to remember each other for the rest of their lives. This was followed by the Ek Phool Teen Kante, directed by "Anup Malik", where he portrayed the pivotal role opposite Monica Bedi. In 1998, Bhalla acted in films including Saazish and Deewana Hoon Pagal Nahi.

In 2005, Bhalla starred opposite Deepshika in Hriday Shetty's Pyaar Mein Twist, where he portrayed the role of Yash Khurana's (Rishi Kapoor) son, Rajiv Khurana. The film tells the story of two lonely adults (played by Rishi Kapoor and Dimple Kapadia), who fall in love and decide to marry and how their grown up children find the entire situation offensive and they find themselves torn between love for each other.

In 2006, Bhalla portrayed the role of Rohit Verma opposite Esha Deol in Vikram Bhatt's Ankahee. This movie was based upon the life of former Miss Universe Sushmita Sen, who was publicly in a relationship with Indian film director Vikram Bhatt. In the same year, he anchored Bollywood Tonight on Zee Muzic. He also appeared in the Salman Khan-starring Hollywood movie Marigold and the Shahid Kapoor-starring Chance Pe Dance.

In 2014, Bhalla also worked with Salman Khan in the movie Jai Ho, directed and produced by Sohail Khan. He played a small role of Suman's (Genelia Deshmukh) brother, Rohan. The film was released on 24 January 2014 along 3900 Screens in India and taking Overseas around 650 Screens, to mixed critical reception, but was declared a Semi Hit by Box Office India.

=== Television career ===
In 2001, Bhalla started his television career with Apne Paraye, where he played the role of veteran actor Rajesh Khanna's son. Thereafter, he worked in Karishma - The Miracles of Destiny and Jassi Jaissi Koi Nahin. He also appeared in Sanjog Se Bani Sangini as Ram Mathur on Zee TV.

In 2002, Bhalla was approached by Anurag Basu to play the main lead in Zee TV's show Miit, where he portrayed the lead role of Akash. The story of the show is based on the novel Noukadubi, written by the Indian poet Rabindranath Tagore in 1905. Later, Bhalla left the show, being replaced by Hiten Tejwani.

In 2003, Bhalla featured as male lead in the role of Dr. Aryan Rajsingh in Tum Bin Jaaoon Kahaan on Zee TV. The show is based on the popular Indian novel November Rain; The story revolves around Aryan, who loses his girlfriend Muskaan in a road mishap. Blaming himself for her death, he goes into a state of depression.

In 2005, Bhalla was approached for the lead role of Arjun Sadarangani in Star Plus's show Shanno Ki Shaadi, co-starring Divya Dutta. The story is about a traditional Punjabi family having trouble finding a suitable match for the middle daughter, Shanno who is shy, introverted and makes the best parathas. The show earned him a lot of popularity.

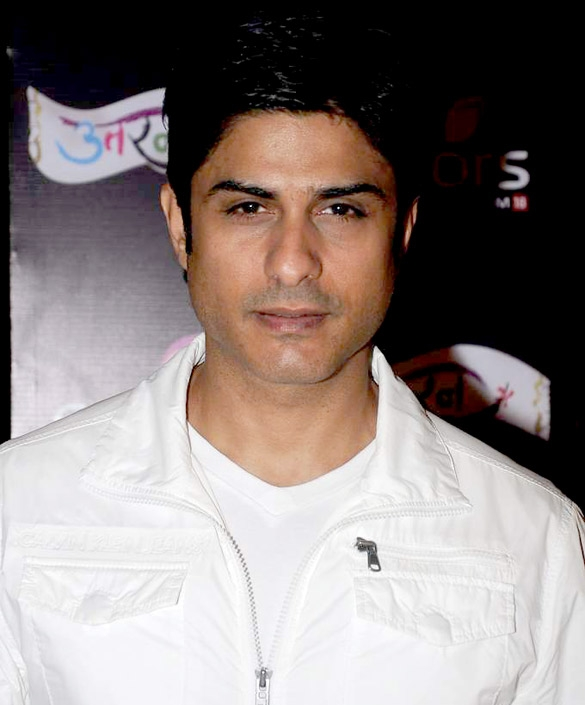
Bhalla at the success bash of Uttaran

Bhalla appeared in reality shows including the 2006 stunt reality show Fear Factor India on Sony Entertainment Television and the 2011 celebrity singing reality show Star Ya Rockstar on Zee TV.

In February 2011, Bhalla was approached to play the negative role in Zee TV's drama series Sanjog Se Bani Sangini, in which he portrayed the role of Ram Mathur, a bank manager who is married to Rudra's (played by Mohammad Iqbal Khan) sister to get revenge.

In April 2012, Bhalla replaced Nandish Sandhu to play the protagonist in Film Farm productions's drama series Uttaran. He was cast as Yuvraj's father, Veer Singh Bundela. The show tells the story of two friends of different economic backgrounds, Tapasya (played by Rashami Desai) and Ichcha (played by Tina Dutta). Tapasya, a rich daughter of a wealthy Jogi Thakur (played by Ayub Khan) and Ichcha, a daughter of a maid. In spite of the vast difference in status, the little girls become best friends.

In September 2013, Bhalla was roped to play an episodic role in 4 Lions Films production's crime thriller show Arjun, where he played the role of a Psychopath killer, who changes into different avatars to kill people.

In October 2015, he entered Colors TV's game show Bigg Boss 9 as a contestant and was paired opposite Yuvika Chaudhary, but got evicted on 1 November 2015 in the 3rd week.

== Music career ==
=== Debut and breakthrough ===
Bhalla also pursued his career in singing. In 1995, he launched his first album entitled Awaara. Thereafter, in 1997, he released his second album named Dhuan, which has a song "Hai Dhuan", which received wide acceptance and gave him immense popularity. In 2007, he gave his first playback voice for the song "Paagal Si Saari Leheren", from the movie Marigold. In September 2007, Bhalla launched his album titled Mehek Teri, which has seven songs. The album has launched under Frankfinn Music, produced by Jatin Sharma, with music composed by Sandeep-Surya and Vivek Bakshi. Bhalla came into prominence for being the playback voice for the super hit song "Po Po", featuring Salman Khan, Ajay Devgn and Sanjay Dutt, from the blockbuster 2012 movie Son Of Sardar.

=== Hai Dhuan and success (1997) ===
In 1997, Bhalla launched an album named Dhuan, its song "Hai Dhhuan Hai Dhhuan" became a huge hit and gave him immense popularity. This song marked a significant turning point in his singing career. Speaking about what music means to him, he said: "Music is religion for me. It gives me peace of mind, which is extremely important in our profession where one goes through so much stress. When I sit with my tanpura and do my "riyaaz" in the morning, I transcend into another world."

== Film production and direction ==
Bhalla owns a production company, Rat Race Entertainment, which was established in 2008. It has made programmes for one Canadian and two Pakistani TV channels. The production house has also produced two shows – Bol Bachan and Pixtionary for Indian channels. Bhalla is also the director of IndoWest Films, which was established in 2013. It's primarily a line production company and is founded by two Indo-Canadians, Sam Chandola. The company is designed to assist Indian productions get easy, expert and dependable access to the locations.

== Filmography ==
| Year | Film | Role | Notes | Co–Star |
|---|---|---|---|---|
| 1995 | Sauda | Deepak | Lead role | Neelam Kothari |
| 1995 | Taaqat | Aklakh | Lead role | Kajol |
| 1997 | Jeeo Shaan Se | Kishan | Supporting role | Sakshi Shivanand |
| 1997 | Dil Ke Jharoke Main | Vijay Rai | Lead role | Manisha Koirala; Parveen Dastur |
| 1997 | Ek Phool Teen Kante | Vikas Verma | Lead role | Monica Bedi |
| 1998 | Saazish | Tony | Supporting role | |
| 1998 | Deewana Hoon Pagal Nahi | Prashant | Lead role | Ayesha Jhulka |
| 2000 | Shikaar | Karan Nath | Supporting role | Ayesha Jhulka |
| 2005 | Pyaar Mein Twist | Rajeev Khurana | Supporting role | Deepshikha Nagpal |
| 2006 | Ankahee | Rohit Verma | Supporting role | Esha Deol |
| 2007 | Marigold | Raj Sondi | Supporting role | |
| 2010 | Chance Pe Dance | Gaurav Saxena | Supporting role | |
| 2014 | Jai Ho | Rohan | Supporting role | |
| 2015 | Chooriyan | | Supporting role | |

== Discography ==
| Year | Title | Album/Film |
|---|---|---|
| 1995 | "Awaara" | Awaara |
| 1997 | "Hai Dhuan" | Dhuan |
| 2007 | "Mehek Teri" (featuring Vikas Bhalla) | Mehek Teri |
| 2007 | "Paagal Si Saari Leheren" | Marigold |
| 2012 | "Po Po" | Son of Sardar |
| 2013 | "Tu Ne Maaliq Mere" | Dilli Gang |

== Television ==
| Year | Serial | Role | Notes | Co–Star |
|---|---|---|---|---|
| 2001–2002 | Apne Paraye | | Lead role | Narayani Shastri |
| 2002–2003 | Kkusum | Mohnish Manchandani | Supporting role | Amita Chandekar |
| 2002–2003 | Kohi Apna Sa | Aditya | Supporting role | Smita Bansal |
| 2003 | Miit | Akash | Lead role | Deepa Parab |
| 2003 | Karishma – The Miracles Of Destiny | Arjun | Cameo role | Karishma Kapoor |
| 2003–2005 | Tum Bin Jaaoon Kahaan | Dr. Aryan Rajsingh | Lead role | Jividha Sharma; Seema Shetty; Neetha Shetty |
| 2005 | Tum Bin Jaaoon Kahaan | Rudra | Negative role | |
| 2005–2006 | Jassi Jaissi Koi Nahin | Chiranjeev "CJ" Oberoi | Negative role | |
| 2005–2006 | Shanno Ki Shaadi | Arjun Sadarangani | Lead role | Divya Dutta |
| 2006 | Naa Jaane Kyon | | Lead role | |
| 2011 | Sanjog Se Bani Sangini | Ram Mathur | Negative role | |
| 2012–2013 | Uttaran | Veer Singh Bundela | Lead role | Tina Dutta; Sonica Handa |
| 2013 | Na Bole Tum Na Maine Kuch Kaha 2 | Veer Singh Bundela (Episode 18 & Episode 19) | Mahasangam with Na Bole Tum Na Maine Kuch Kaha 2 | |
| 2013 | Arjun | Neeraj (Episode 109) | Episodic role | |
| 2017–2018; 2019 | Udaan | Inspector Ranvijay Singh | Negative role | Vidhi Pandya |
| 2017 | Laado 2 | Inspector Ranvijay Singh (Episode 30) | Mahasangam with Udaan | |
| 2018 | Ishq Mein Marjawan – Jashn-E-Tashan | Inspector Ranvijay Singh (Episode 74) | Special episode with Ishq Mein Marjawan on New Year's Day | |
| 2018 | Tu Aashiqui – Jashn-E-Ishq | Inspector Ranvijay Singh (Episode 105) | Special episode with Tu Aashiqui on Valentine's Day | |

=== Reality shows ===
| Year | Show | Role | Notes |
|---|---|---|---|
| 2006 | Fear Factor India | Contestant | |
| 2011 | Star Ya Rockstar | Contestant | |
| 2015 | Bigg Boss 9 | Contestant | Evicted on day 21 (1 November 2015) |
