= Santa Banta Pvt Ltd =

2016 Indian film by Akashdeep Sabir

Santa Banta Pvt. Ltd.
- Directed by: Akashdeep Sabir
- Written by: Asad Ajmeri; Pawan Soni
- Produced by: Sheeba Akashdeep; Viacom 18 Motion Pictures
- Starring: Vir Das; Boman Irani; Neha Dhupia; Lisa Haydon
- Edited by: Nitin Rokde
- Music by: Jassi Katyal; Nadeem Amjad; Jaidev Kumar
- Production company: Viacom 18 Motion Pictures
- Distributed by: Viacom 18 Motion Pictures
- Release date: 22 April 2016
- Running time: 112 minutes
- Country: India
- Language: Hindi

Santa Banta Pvt. Ltd. is a 2016 Indian Hindi-language spy-comedy film directed by Akashdeep Sabir, produced by Viacom 18 and distributed by Viacom 18 and Cinetek Telefilms. The film features Vir Das, Boman Irani, Lisa Haydon and Neha Dhupia in leading roles.

== Cast ==
- Vir Das as Banteshwar Singh Bollad/ Banta
- Boman Irani as Santheshwar Singh Sollad/ Santa
- Neha Dhupia as Kareena Roy / Biloo Kaur
- Lisa Haydon as Queenie "QT" Taneja
- Johnny Lever as Pushkar Nepali aka Chooza
- Ram Kapoor as Sonu Sultan
- Vijay Raaz as Arvind Dhariwal
- Sanjay Mishra as Akbar Allahbadi
- Ayub Khan as Shankar Roy, Indian High Commissioner and Kareena's husband

== Production ==
The film was primarily shot in Fiji and Punjab.

On his film's association with Viacom 18, director Akashdeep said, "It’s very important to have a corporate firm that believes in you. At the end of the day, I don’t have an all-India network for the film’s release. Corporate firms guarantee a good release. Distribution of films is sheer commerce with no creative satisfaction".

== Soundtrack ==
Singer Sonu Nigam has sung five songs in the film.

No.	Title	Lyrics	Music	Singer(s)	Length
1.	"Machli Jal Ki Rani Hai"	Kumaar	Jaidev Kumar	Sonu Nigam, Vikas Bhalla
2.	"Lo Aa Gaye Santa Banta"		Nadeem Amjad	Sonu Nigam
3.	"Hit Kardi"		Jassi Katyal	Sonu Nigam, Diljit Dosanjh
4.	"Ishq Karle Anytime"		Jassi Katyal	Sonu Nigam, Mika Singh
5.	"Tooti Boldi"	Kumaar	Jassi Katyal	Sonu Nigam, Mika Singh

== Controversy ==
The majority Sikh state of Punjab, India banned the film for allegedly portraying the Sikh community in a mocking manner.
