= Taaqat =

Taaqat may refer to:

- Taaqat (1982 film), Indian film directed by Narendra Bedi
- Taaqat (1995 film), Bollywood romantic crime film
- Aaj Ki Taaqat (lit. 'Today's Power'), a 1992 Indian film
