= Iddaru Mitrulu (1999 film) =

1999 Telugu film directed by K. Raghavendra Rao

- Theatrical poster
- Directed by: K. Raghavendra Rao
- Written by: Bhupathi Raja; Deevakar Babu
- Produced by: K. Raghavendra Rao; K. Krishna Mohana Rao
- Starring: Chiranjeevi; Ramya Krishna; Sakshi Sivanand; Suresh
- Cinematography: V. Jayaram
- Edited by: Gautham Raju
- Music by: Mani Sharma
- Production company: R. K. Associates
- Distributed by: Geetha Arts
- Release date: 30 April 1999
- Country: India
- Language: Telugu

Iddaru Mitrulu (transl. Two friends) is a 1999 Indian Telugu-language drama film directed by K. Raghavendra Rao. It stars Chiranjeevi, Sakshi Sivanand and Ramya Krishna. The film was released on 30 April 1999 to positive reviews. It was dubbed into Tamil as Singanadai .

== Story ==
Vijay (Chiranjeevi) and Anita (Sakshi Sivanand) are best friends. They share their thoughts, happiness, and pain with each other. One day Anita finds love in a photographer, Prakash (Suresh) and marries him, while Vijay plays a lover boy and marries Shanti (Ramya Krishna). However, Anita's happiness ends when she finds out that her husband is two-timing her. Vijay consoles her but his wife is unhappy that he spends so much time with her and gives him an ultimatum. He chooses his friend and takes care of her and her unborn child and later reunites her with her husband. Anita wants to see her friend in a happy state as well and reunites him with Shanti. The film ends on a happy note, with the happy couples holding the newborn baby.

== Cast ==
- Chiranjeevi as Vijay
- Sakshi Sivanand as Anita
- Ramya Krishna as Shanti
- Suresh as Prakash
- Sudhakar as Harishchandra a.k.a. Hari
- Chandra Mohan as Ranga Rao, Vijay's father
- Mallikarjuna Rao as Vijay's Cook
- AVS as Navala Subba Rao, Shanti's Father
- Y. Vijaya as Shanti's Mother
- Brahmanandam as Titanic, Shanti's Bodyguard
- Subbaraya Sharma
- Rambha for Cameo appearance in song, Rukku Rukku

== Soundtrack ==
The music for this film was composed by Manisharma. The audio was a huge hit and all the songs were chartbusters. All the tracks were massive hits, especially the tracks "Hey Rukku" featuring Rambha, "Nootokka Jillalo" gained much mass attention due to heavy dance steps. The soundtrack was said to have sold "More than 3 lakh cassettes [..] within days of the audio release".

Iddaru Mitrulu

Soundtrack album by Mani Sharma
- Released: 1999
- Recorded: 1999
- Genre: Soundtrack
- Length: 29:38
- Label: Aditya Music
- Producer: Mani Sharma

Mani Sharma chronology
Neti Gandhi (1999)	Iddaru Mitrulu (1999)	Raja Kumarudu (1999)

Track Listing
No.	Title	Lyrics	Singer(s)	Length
1.	"Hey Rukku Rukku"	Chandrabose	S. P. Balasubrahmanyam & K. S. Chithra	4:26
2.	"Changu Changu"	Chandrabose	Udit Narayan & Harini	4:38
3.	"Dhek Baba Dhek"	Chandrabose	S. P. Balasubrahmanyam & K. S. Chithra	5:24
4.	"Noottokka Jillallo"	Chandrabose	Mano & K. S. Chithra	5:15
5.	"Manasavachha Manasiste"	Chandrabose	S. P. Balasubrahmanyam & Sujatha Mohan	4:46
6.	"Bangaram Techhi"	Sirivennela Seetharama Sastry	K. S. Chithra, Partha Sarathi	5:08
Total length:				29:34

== Reception ==
Idlebrain wrote "It is a very atypical of Raghavendra Rao and Chiru combination to select such a soft story. He did not do complete justice to direction as he seem to have lost his grip over subject during the last two reels. Muthaya Subbaiah or Jayanth would have handled this story in a better manner. He hurried at the end giving a complete anti-climax". Andhra Online wrote "You have great expectations when it is a Chiranjeevi film. More so when it is directed by Raghavendra Rao. Sad to say, expectations fall flat, at least when it comes to the story which is anything but new. How many times, Oh! How many times has friendship between a man and a woman and the misunderstandings about it been dealt with? Innumerable".
