= Anjanibai Lolekar =

Indian classical singer (1928–2001)

- Born: 8 September 1928; Loliem, Goa, Portuguese India
- Died: 21 September 2001 (aged 73)
- Relatives: Kashmera Shah (granddaughter)
- Musical career
- Genre: Hindustani classical music
- Occupation: Vocalist

Anjanibai Lolekar (8 September 1928 – 21 November 2001) was an Indian classical vocalist from Goa.

== Early life and training ==
Lolyekar was born on 8 September 1928 in the village of Loliem, Portuguese Goa. She was raised in a family with a strong musical lineage, which influenced her interest in the arts from a young age. She commenced her formal training in classical music at the age of seven. Her older brother, Yeshwant, was a disciple of Pandit Haribhau Ghangrekar, who in turn was a disciple of Pandit Ramkrishnabuwa Vaze. Her younger brother Ramdas, was an excellent Tabla player. Both broters were students of the Gwalior Gharana (school) Gayakee.

She moved to Bombay, British India, for further studies at the age of four, and initially studied the style of Gwalior Gayakee from her brother. She spent twenty-five years training under the tutelage of Ramchandra Banker, a noted singer and harmonium player from Bombay. Her vocal style was noted for its melodious quality and the strength of her taan (rapid melodic passages). She also studied under the tutelage of Ustad Anwar Hussain Khan from Agra and Pandit Govindrao Agni hails from Loliem.

== Musical career ==
Lolyekar's first public concert took place when she was fifteen years old at Wagle Hall in Girgaon, Bombay, as part of the Indian Musical Circle. The reception she received at this debut served as an impetus for her professional career. A significant milestone in her career was her performance at the All India Musical Conference in Calcutta, which brought her widespread acclaim.

Over the years, she performed in various cities across India, including Delhi, Madras, Ahmedabad, Surat, Gwalior, Hubli, Dharwad, Pune, and her native Goa. She regularly performed for Doordarshan and All India Radio.

== Personal life ==
Beyond her musical pursuits, Lolyekar contributed to social causes, including providing significant support for the construction of the Maratha Samaj building in Girgaon, Mumbai. She also contributed to the Bihar Relief Fund when then Chief Minister of Goa, Dayanand Bandodkar, was the chairman.

Lolyekar married Baburao Banker, a fellow disciple of Ustad Anwar Hussain Khan from Agra, Uttar Pradesh. She had three children: daughters Suvarna and Sangeeta, and a son, Sahiram. Her children have continued the family's musical tradition, with each achieving recognition in the field of music at a young age. Her granddaughter, Kashmera Shah, is an actress involved in Hindi films.

== Awards and accolades ==
She was honoured for her contributions by the Gomantak Marathi Academy.

== Death ==
Loyekar died on 21 November 2001.
