= Satya 2 =

- Theatrical release poster
- Directed by: Ram Gopal Varma
- Written by: Radhika Anand
- Produced by: M Samanth Kumar Reddy
- Starring: Puneet Singh Ratn; Sharwanand; Anaika Soti
- Cinematography: Vikash Saraf
- Edited by: Sanga Pratap Kumar
- Music by: Score: Shakthikanth Karthick; Songs: Nitin Raikwar; Sanjeev–Darshan; Kary Arora; Shree D
- Distributed by: Mammoth Media Entertainment Private Limited
- Release dates: 25 October 2013 (UAE); 8 November 2013 (India)
- Running time: 142 minutes
- Country: India
- Languages: Hindi; Telugu
- Budget: ₹15 crore (US$1.6 million)

Satya 2 (transl. Truth 2) is a 2013 Indian crime film directed by Ram Gopal Varma. Shot simultaneously in Hindi and Telugu languages, the film stars Puneet Singh Ratn (Hindi), Sharwanand (Telugu), Anaika Soti and Mahesh Thakur. The film tells the story of Satya, an immigrant who comes to Mumbai aiming to refashion the Mumbai underworld. The film is the fourth installment of the Gangster series, unrelated to the original trilogy.

== Plot ==
The movie revolves around the world of the criminal underworld, which has experienced a decline in Mumbai over the past decade. The protagonist, Satya, arrives in Mumbai and secures a job with Lahoti, a prominent construction tycoon. In an attempt to outshine a rival in a business deal, Satya becomes entangled with the mafia and other diminished underworld factions.

As the story progresses, Satya finds himself caught in a conflict with RK, a retired mafia leader, and his son, who harbors a grudge against Satya. In order to protect himself, Satya is forced to eliminate both RK and his son. Meanwhile, he also manages to secure production funds for a film through his connections, helps his friend acquire a flat, and brings his girlfriend Chitra to live with him.

However, Satya's actions attract numerous enemies, leading to a violent shootout with the police. Tragically, during the chaos, Satya loses both his girlfriend and his friend. Although he is eventually apprehended, Satya exploits his connections to establish a company that facilitates his release from jail.

Emboldened by his newfound freedom, Satya emerges as the newest and most influential underworld leader in Mumbai. He begins his reign with a strong determination to dominate the criminal landscape, leveraging the power and influence he has acquired through his connections and experiences.

== Cast ==
Cast (Hindi)	Cast (Telugu)	Role (Hindi)	Role (Telugu)	Ref.
Puneet Singh Ratn	Sharwanand	Satya Prakash	Satya Prakash	
Anaika Soti		Chitra	Chitra	
Aradhna Gupta		Special	Special	
Mahesh Thakur		Lahothi	Eshwar Rao	
Amit Riyaan		Naara	Naara	
Raj Premi		RK	RK	
Amal Sehrawat		TK	TK	
Ashok Samarth		Solomon	Solomon	
Kaushal Kapoor		Purshottam	Purshottam	
Mrunal Jain		Abhijeet	Abhijeet	
Vikram Singh		Anna	Anna	
Mohan Pandey	Suresh	Pandharkar	Subramanyam	
Vijay Kaushik	Shanmugarajan	ACP Bharti (Note: Full name only mentioned in Hindi version.)	ACP Bharti	
Allauddin Khan	Ajay Rathnam	Sudhir Mahajan	Sambasiva Rao	
Priya Gamre		Abhijeet's wife	Abhijeet's wife	
Jagdish Kansara	Radha Ravi	Chief Minister	Chief Minister	
Iqbal Dosani	Thalaivasal Vijay	Commissioner P. N. Singh	Commissioner Prakash Rao	
Pooran Kiri		Task force man	Task force man	
Makarand Deshpande		Voiceover	Voiceover	

== Production ==
"As a film maker I have been doing a deep study of the underworld and its gangsters for more than two decades primarily for the purposes of gathering subject matters for my films and to get inspired for characters from real life references..And that's how films like Satya and Company happened... Then one day it occurred to me what if a guy out there studied the same gangsters not for becoming a film maker but for the purpose of becoming a gangster himself.it's that idea of mine which finally shaped itself into Satya 2. A new age gangster will obviously be armed with the mistakes of the earlier gangsters and also with the modern day policing methods" said Ram Gopal Varma. One romantic song of Satya 2 was shot in Kashmir in June 2013. The Central Board of Film Certification (CBFC) passed Satya 2 with A certificate with 3 cuts. Satya 2 is made within the budget of Rs 15 crore.

== Soundtrack ==
Satya 2

Soundtrack album by: Nitin Raikwar; Sanjeev-Darshan; Kary Arora; Shree D
- Released: 15 October 2013
- Genre: Film soundtrack
- Length: 45:41
- Label: Super Cassettes Industries Limited
- Producers: Nitin Raikwar; Sanjeev-Darshan; Kary Arora; Shree D

Nitin Raikwar chronology
Raftaar (2009)	Satya 2 (2013)

Sanjeev-Darshan chronology
Grand Masti (2013)	Satya 2 (2013)	Black Currency

Kary Arora chronology
Satya 2 (2013)

Shree D chronology
Besharam (2013)	Satya 2 (2013)

The background score of the film has been composed by Shakthikanth Karthick. The soundtrack of the film consisted of nine tracks composed by Nitin Raikwar, Sanjeev–Darshan, Kary Arora and Shree D and lyrics by Moied Elhaam, Nitin Raikwar, Kumaar, Sonny Ravan and Shree D on 15 October 2013.

Track listing
No.	Title	Lyrics	Music	Singer(s)	Length
1.	"Tu Nahi"	Nitin Raikwar	Nitin Raikwar	Leonard Victor, Shweta Pandit	3:39
2.	"Special"	Kumaar	Sanjeev–Darshan	Payal Aditya Dev	6:33
3.	"Maagne Se (Title Song)"	Kumaar	Sanjeev–Darshan	Sanjeev–Darshan, Arghya	4:49
4.	"Palkon Se"	Moid Elhaam	Nitin Raikwar	Rishi Singh, Shweta Pandit	4:34
5.	"Saathi Re"	Nitin Raikwar	Nitin Raikwar	Rishi Singh, Tishika Jain	4:41
6.	"Taaqat"	Kumaar	Sanjeev–Darshan	Hricha Narayan, Jolly Mukherjee, Arghya, Sanjeev Rathod	4:18
7.	"Control"	Sonny Ravan & Shree D	Shree D	Sonny Ravan & Shree D	6:32
8.	"Veerani"	Kumaar	Sanjeev–Darshan	Payal Aditya Dev, Mohammed Irfan	5:08
9.	"Satya Is Back Again"	Kary Arora	Kary Arora	Arsalaan Akhoon, Kary Arora, Makrand 'Mac' Deshpandey	5:27
Total length:					39:45

Telugu Tracklist
No.	Title	Music	Singer(s)	Length
1.	"Evevo Pichchi Voohaley"	Nitin Raikwar	Leonard Vincent, Shweta Pandit
2.	"Nuvvu Leka Nenu Lenu"	Nitin Raikwar	Sreekanth, Shweta Pandit
3.	"O Priya Priya"	Nitin Raikwar	Ram Gopal Varma, Supriya Joshi
4.	"Adigithey Ivvaru"	Sanjeev–Darshan	Sreekanth
5.	"Dhaballo Specialu"	Sanjeev–Darshan	Geetha Madhuri
6.	"Bhashma Dhaari"	Shree D	Sooraj
7.	"Polisodi Powwer"	Sanjeev–Darshan	Geetha Madhuri, Venugopal, Raghu Kunche, Sreekanth
8.	"Samaram Daarilo Veedithey"	Sanjeev–Darshan	Sooraj, Latha Krishna

== Release and reception ==
Director Ram Gopal Verma hinted that Satya 2 will be his last film on the underworld and that now he wants to make romantic movies. Satya 2 was released on 2 8 October 2013 in U. A. E. and 8 November 2013 in India.

The film received mixed reviews, Subhash K. Jha of Bollywood News stated that Ram Gopal Varma returns to form with Satya 2. Taran Adarsh of Bollywood Hungama gave it 3 out of 5 stars and stated that Satya 2 has the right elements that make a quintessential gangster film. Madhureeta Mukherjee of Times of India gave it 2 out of 5 stars.

The Telugu version released to negative reviews with Sangeetha of The Hindu advising to "skip this and watch the original Satya."

== Box office ==
Satya 2 opened to an average opening-day occupancy of around 5 percent, the overseas market being no different with the film seeing a release in UAE. Owing to this the film had an opening day collections of ₹3−4 million (US$−42,000) with ₹1.5−2 million (US$−21,000) coming from Mumbai itself keeping in accordance with the wide release with the rest coming from East Punjab and DUP with collections of around ₹.2 million (US$2,100) and ₹.5 million (US$5,200), respectively.
