= Kashmera Shah =

Indian–American actress

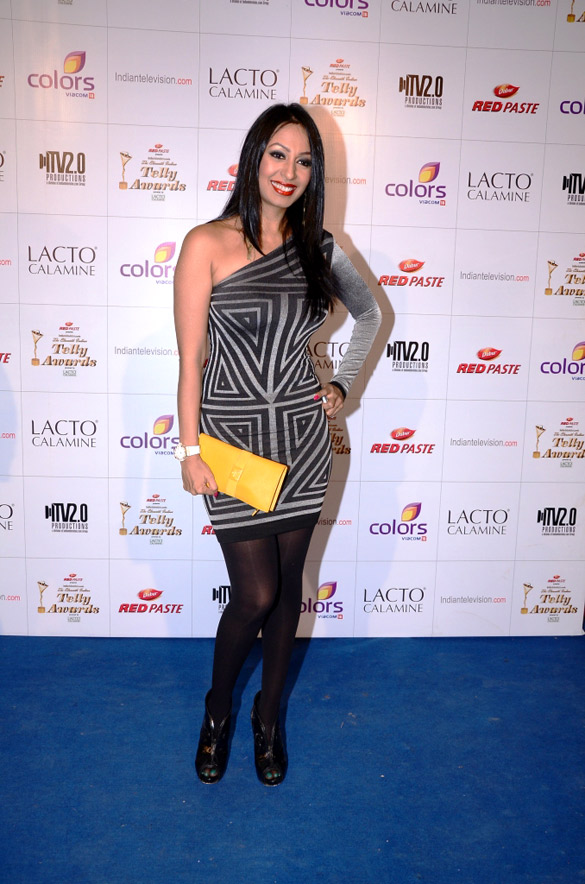
- Shah in 2012
- Born: December 2, 1972 (age 53); Bombay, Maharashtra, India
- Citizenship: United States
- Years active: 1994–present
- Spouse(s): Brad Listermann (m. 2001; div. 2007) Krushna Abhishek (m. 2012)
- Children: 2
- Relatives: Anjanibai Lolekar (grandmother)
- Family: See Govinda family

Kashmera Shah (born December 2, 1972) is an Indian-American actress known for her work in Hindi and Marathi films. She was also a contestant on the reality shows Bigg Boss 1, Nach Baliye 3 and Fear Factor: Khatron Ke Khiladi 4.

== Personal life ==
Shah was born in Bombay, Maharashtra to a Marathi and Gujarati family. She is the granddaughter of Goan classical vocalist Anjanibai Lolekar. Shah holds US citizenship and maintains residence in Mumbai and Los Angeles.

Shah married Hollywood producer Brad Listermann in 2001. The couple divorced in 2007.

She met Govinda's nephew Krushna Abhishek at the sets of movie Aur Pappu Paas Ho Gaya and started dating eventually, and they got married in 2013. They eloped to Las Vegas, Nevada. They have twin sons born in 2017 via surrogacy, Rayaan and Krishaang.

== Career ==
In 2011, the French globetrotter Antoine de Maximy conducted an interview with Shah for his documentary, I will sleep in Bollywood.

In 2024, Shah and her husband Krushna Abhishek were cast together in the Hindi reality show Laughter Chefs hosted by Bharti Singh and Harpal Singh Sokhi.

== Filmography ==
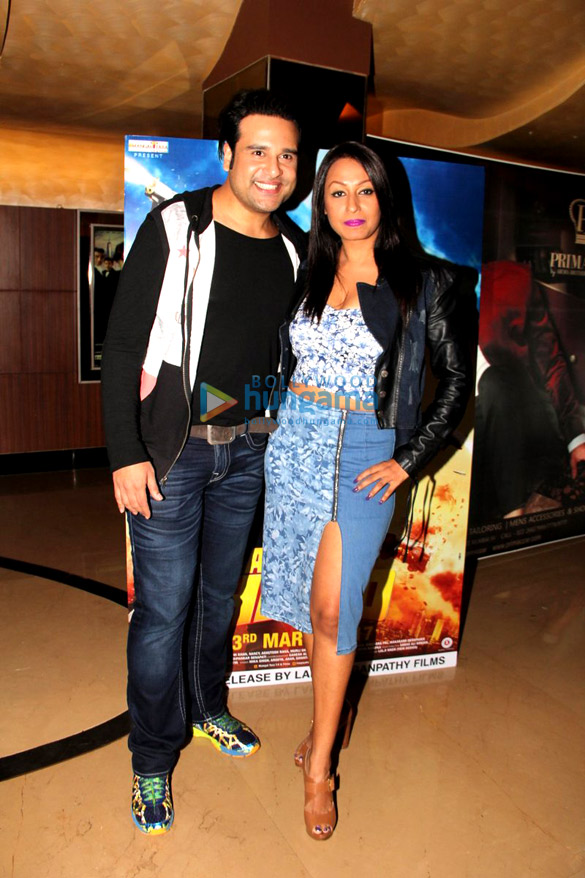
Shah with husband Krushna Abhishek at the trailer launch of Govinda’s movie ‘Aa Gaya Hero’

=== Films ===
Year	Title	Role	Language	Notes
1996	Intlo Illalu Vantintlo Priyuralu	Dancer	Telugu	Special appearance in the song "Pappa Ro Paap"
1996	Ramudochadu	Dancer	Telugu	Special appearance
1997	Yes Boss	Sheela Chaudhary		
1997	Koi Kisi Se Kam Nahin			
1998	Saazish			
1998	Pyar To Hona Hi Tha	Nisha		
1999	Dulhan Banoo Mein Teri	Dolly S. Thakur		
1999	Hindustan Ki Kasam	Nisha Jaitly		
1999	Vaastav: The Reality	Dancer		Special appearance in the song "Jawani Se Jung Ye Choli Meri Ab Tang"
2000	Dulhan Hum Le Jayenge	Lovely		
2000	Hera Pheri	Kabira's sidekick		
2000	Jungle	Bali		
2000	Dil Pe Mat Le Yaar	Dancer		
2000	Kurukshetra			Special appearance in the song "Banthan"
2000	Kahin Pyaar Na Ho Jaaye	Neelu		
2001	Aashiq			
2001	Ravanaprabhu	Dancer	Malayalam	Special appearance in the song "Thakilu Pukilu"
2001	Zahreela	Nisha	Hindi	
2002	Ankhen	Dancer	Hindi	Special appearance in the song "Chalka Chalka"
2003	Janasheen	Tina	Hindi	
2004	Murder	Lounge Singer	Hindi	Special appearance in the song "Dil Ko Hazar Baar Roka"
2004	Ishq Qayamat	Shweta	Hindi	
2005	Revati	Revati	Hindi	
2006	My Bollywood Bride	Reena Khanna	Hindi	
2006	Holiday	Alisha	Hindi	
2006	Phir Hera Pheri	Kabira's sidekick	Hindi	Archival footage
2007	Aur Pappu Pass Ho Gaya	Kiran Chauhan	Hindi	
2008	Chasing Happiness	Kareena	Hindi	
2008	Naag Naagin		Bhojpuri	
2009	Wake Up Sid	Sonia	Hindi	
2009	World Cupp 2011	Dancer	Hindi	Special appearance
2010	City of Gold	Mami	Hindi	
2010	Agam Puram		Tamil	Special appearance in the song "Oru Mani Rendu Mani"
2011	J'irai Dormir A Bollywood	Herself	French	Documentary film
2011	9 Eleven		Hindi	
2012	Jai Jai Maharashtra Majha		Marathi	
2013	Kyun Hua Achanak		Hindi	
2015	Aawhan	Malinga	Marathi	
2017	FU: Friendship Unlimited		Marathi	
2018	Shikari	Mrs. Gulaabrao Phoolsundar	Marathi	
2019	Marne Bhi Do Yaaron	Anita	Hindi	Director; Producer
2022	Nay Varanbhat Loncha Kon Nay Koncha	Supriya	Marathi	

=== Television ===
Year	Title	Role	Notes
1994	Hello Bollywood	Mona Darling	
1996	Aarohan	Lata	Episode 11
1997	Private Detective: Two Plus Two Plus One	Amrita	
2006	Bigg Boss 1	Contestant	12th place
2007	Nach Baliye 3	Contestant	2nd runner-up
2008	Kabhi Kabhii Pyaar Kabhi Kabhii Yaar	Contestant	Winner
2009	Iss Jungle Se Mujhe Bachao	Contestant	Quit
2010	Dil Jeetegi Desi Girl	Contestant	1st runner-up
2010	Meethi Choori No.1	Contestant	
2010	Baat Hamari Pakki Hai	Herself	
2011	Fear Factor: Khatron Ke Khiladi 4	Contestant	10th place
2011	Love Lockup 1	Contestant	
2011	Steal Ur Girlfriend 1	Host	
2012	Steal Ur Girlfriend 2	Host	
2013	Hum Ne Li Hai... Shapath	Chief Bureau Officer Maya	
2014	Bigg Boss 8	Herself	Guest
2015–16	Siya Ke Ram	Tataka	
2018	Fourplay	Herself	Web series
2020	Bigg Boss 13	Herself	Guest
2020	Bigg Boss 14	Contestant/Challenger	14th place
2022	Bigg Boss 15	Herself	Guest
2023	Bigg Boss 16	Herself	Guest
2024–2026	Laughter Chefs – Unlimited Entertainment	Contestant	Season 1–3
