= Pooran Kiri =

Indian film and television actor (born 1980)

- Born: Charama, District Kanker Raipur, Chhattisgarh India
- Occupation: Actor
- Years active: 1994–present

Pooran Kiri is an Indian film and television actor best known for his role as Suresh Aggarwal in the 2014 Star Plus television Series Yeh Rishta Kya Kehlata Hai.

== Professional career ==
Kiri started his career as a video editor and worked on a news channel as video editor, he also worked with a news channel in Chhattisgarh. Kiri also participated in more than 200 street plays, Kiri also performed at many stage shows as a mimicry artist and also hosted many shows. In 2002 Kiri joined a theater group IIFTA, Chhattisgarh Madhya Pradesh. Kiri got his first chance in 2011 in daily soap Mann Kee Awaaz Pratigya on STAR Plus.

== Television ==
Year	Title	Role
2011	Mann Kee Awaaz Pratigya	Inspector Sanjay Tiwari
2011-15	Savdhaan India	Various Character
2012	Diya Aur Baati Hum	Malkhan Singh
2012	Yeh Zindagi Hai Gulshan	Dr. Rustam
2012-13	Sapne Suhane Ladakpan Ke	Rahul
2012	Hum Hai Bajrangi	Shani Dev
2013	Yeh Hai Aashiqui	Professor
2014	Beintehaa	Investigating officer- Virendra Kadam
2014	Hatim (TV series)	Jurgaal
2014	Yudh (TV series)	Inspector Purohit Sharma
2014	Devon Ke Dev...Mahadev	Cameo
2014-15	Yeh Rishta Kya Kehlata Hai	Suresh Aggarwal
2015	SuperCops vs Supervillains	Rustam Pizza shop owner
2015	Piya Rangrezz	Tiwari
2015	Mere Angne Mein	Prakash
2015	Gangaa	MLA's PA Verma
2015	Aastha... Atoot Vishwas Ki Kahani	Ramsevak Thakur
2015	Ek Lakshya	Yashpal Bakshi (lawyer)
2016	CID (Indian TV series)	Various Character
2016	Crime Patrol (TV series)	Various Character
2019	Phir Laut Aayi Naagin	Vikas (2nd killer of nagarjun)
2021	Ranju Ki Betiyaan	Mohan

== Filmography ==
Year	Title	Role	Language	Notes
2013	Thalaivaa	Jadhav	Tamil	
2013	Satya 2	Task force man	Hindi/Telugu	
2014	Hate Story 2	Bansal Businessman	Hindi	
2015	Phantom	ISI Agent Javed	Hindi	
