= Karishma – The Miracles of Destiny =

- Created by: Akashdeep Sabir
- Written by: Naeem-Ejaz
- Screenplay by: Rafiq Talukdar
- Story by: Sachin Bhowmick
- Directed by: Anurag Basu; Siddharth Sen Malhotra; Taulat Sayed
- Starring: Karisma Kapoor; Sanjay Kapoor; Arbaaz Khan; Arshad Warsi; Jugal Hansraj; Vikas Bhalla
- Composer: Anu Malik
- Country of origin: India
- Original language: Hindi
- No. of episodes: 262

Production
- Cinematography: Sanjay Memane
- Editor: Imtiaz Alam Ajaz Sheikh
- Running time: 20 minutes
- Production company: Cinetek telefilms Pvt Ltd

Original release
- Network: Sahara One
- Release: 25 August 2003 – 2004

Karishma – The Miracles Of Destiny is an Indian television serial which was first broadcast on Sahara One on 25 August 2003 and lasted over 262 episodes ending in October 2004. It starred Karisma Kapoor, Sanjay Kapoor, Arbaaz Khan, Arshad Warsi, Vikas Bhalla, Jugal Hansraj, and Ayub Khan. Created by Akashdeep Sabir, it was written by Sachin Bhowmick and directed by Anurag Basu. The title song was composed by Anu Malik and sung by Sonu Nigam and Sapna Mukherjee.

== Plot ==
The serial follows the story of Devyani who from humble beginnings went on to become a very successful businesswoman. The story begins with an aged Devyani, now a 67-year-old mother of two grown-up sons Jai and Sameer and grandmother of Kunal, who is attending a ceremony to celebrate her life achievements. An attempt is made to end her life when a gunman shoots her, but she survives as the bullet only scrapes her arm. The hitman escapes. It is later revealed that her sons plot to have her killed to inherit her wealth. There is also a mysterious character named Aarnav who wants to write a novel based on Devyani's life but seems to have an ulterior motive.

The story shifts between Devyani in New Zealand and Mumbai, where a lookalike of Devyani named Avni is introduced. Her childhood friend Pakiya sees a picture of Devyani in a newspaper and tries to find a connection between Devyani and Avni. The story also includes flashbacks of Devyani in her 20s and the men in her life including Arjun and Amar.

== Cast ==
- Karisma Kapoor as Devyani / Avni
- Sanjay Kapoor as Amar
- Arbaaz Khan as Aarnav
- Harsh Chhaya as Sameer
- Ayub Khan as Jai
- Jugal Hansraj as Kunal (Sameer's son)
- Sheeba Akashdeep as Amrita (Sameer's wife)
- Resham Tipnis as Natasha (Jai's wife)
- Arshad Warsi as Pakiya
- Vikas Bhalla as Arjun
- Vishwajeet Pradhan as Thakur (Arjun's elder brother and Aarnav's grandfather)
- Jayati Bhatia as Thakur's wife
- Pavan Malhotra as Raja
- Sanober Kabir as Riya (Kunal's girlfriend)
- Tinnu Anand as Devyani's lawyer
- Vijay Raaz as Ladoo
- Raju Kher as Devyani's doctor
- Deepshikha Nagpal as Sanjana
- Saadhika Randhawa as Saadhika
- Mayuri Kango as Mansi (Devyani's daughter and Avni's mother)
- Rahul Roy as Rahul
- Uday Tikekar as Devyani's father
