= Saazish (1998 film) =

- DVD cover
- Directed by: Sudhir R Nair
- Written by: Mehmood Ali
- Produced by: Shiv Kumar Daman
- Starring: Mithun Chakraborty; Pooja Batra; Helen; Aruna Irani; Vikas Bhalla; Ishrat Ali; Kashmera Shah
- Music by: Jatin–Lalit
- Release date: 20 February 1998
- Running time: 140 minutes
- Country: India
- Language: Hindi

Saazish (English:Conspiracy) is an Indian Hindi-language action film directed by Sudhir R Nair, starring Mithun Chakraborty, Pooja Batra, Helen, Aruna Irani, Vikas Bhalla, Ishrat Ali and Kashmera Shah. The film was released on 20 February 1998 under the banner of Damini Pictures.

== Plot ==
Deprived of their father's love, David and his brother Tony lost their mother too when they were very young. With the help of an aunty, who was also a social worker, they seek admission in a school in the city. However the school authorities grant permission to admit only one among them. Being elder one, David suggests to send Tony. He wants Tony to become a doctor, so that no further death occurs in his village owing to deprival of medical consultation at the right time, which happened to their mother. So Tony was sent to city, and David becomes a grave digger in the village in order to meet his brother's needs.

As time passes by, Tony becomes a doctor. However he needs to pay donation of 1 Lakh to pursue his MD in college. He comes to village to spend a few days with his brother. As he was about to take leave, David handles him a new gold chain with their photos in the locket. Tony reminds David of the donation amount just before boarding the bus. David is astonished to hear the same, and he feels quite dejected. He try to borrow the money from a money-lender in the village, however since he didn't have anything to keep as security, he is sent empty-handed.

One night David is approached by two men to bury a body. He doesn't take it as they fail to produce the death certificate of the corpse. However, when they quote an amount of 1 lakh, he had to think again on his decision, and finally agrees to bury the corpse. After taking the money, he buries the corpse which was in a sack, as it is. He then moves to his mother's graveyard to and tells that it was for his brother's sake that he had stood to bury this body illegally, and he is willing to accept any punishment for the same. A strong wind blows away the currency notes held in his hand. In the process of extracting the flying notes, something gets stuck in his fingers. To his shock, he finds it to be the gold chain he had gifted to Tony. Confused at this, he re-opens the buried corpse and remove the sack from the dead body to see that the corpse he had just buried was that of his brother Tony's.

David then leaves to city to find out the truth behind his brother's death. Life becomes difficult for him as a series of murders occur in the medical college, with each of the victims possessing some vital clues regarding Tony's death. Will David be able to succeed in his mission despite unfavourable circumstances?

== Cast ==
- Mithun Chakraborty As David Bragenza
- Pooja Batra As Rachel
- Helen as Merry aunty
- Aruna Irani As Dcosta Aunty
- Vikas Bhalla As Tony
- Ishrat AlI
- Kashmera Shah

== Soundtrack ==
#	Title	Singer(s)	Lyricist(s)
1	"Khushi Ka Rang"	Abhijeet, Kavita Krishnamurthy, Bali Brahmbhatt	Vinod Mahendra
2	"Is Dil Mein Nahin"	Udit Narayan, Vijeta Pandit	Hasrat Jaipuri
3	"Zindagi Bin Pyar Ke (Male)"	Kumar Sanu	Israr Ansari
4	"Tu Itna Pyar Kar"	Udit Narayan, Vijeta Pandit	Indeevar
5	"Zindagi Bin Pyar Ke (Female)"	Vijeta Pandit	Israr Ansari
6	"Dil Yeh Kahe Pyar Hone Laga Hai"	Alka Yagnik	Hasrat Jaipuri
