= Ranju Ki Betiyaan =

Indian television series

- Genre: Drama
- Created by: Rashmi Sharma
- Screenplay by: Jyoti Tandon Sekhri
- Story by: Amit Jha
- Starring: Reena Kapoor; Ayub Khan (actor); Roopal Tyagi; Deepshikha Nagpal
- Opening theme: Ranju Ki Betiyaan
- Country of origin: India
- Original language: Hindi
- No. of episodes: 253

Production
- Producers: Rashmi Sharma; Pawan Kumar
- Camera setup: Multi-camera
- Running time: 20–22 minutes
- Production company: Rashmi Sharma Telefilms

Original release
- Network: Dangal TV
- Release: 15 February – 6 December 2021

Ranju Ki Betiyaan (transl. Ranju's daughters) is an Indian television drama series produced under Rashmi Sharma Telefilms. It stars Reena Kapoor, Ayub Khan, Karan Khandelwal, Jeevansh Chadha, Monika Chauhan and Roopal Tyagi.

== Plot ==
After her husband Guddu leaves Ranju for another woman, Lalita, Ranju bravely stands her ground in a male-dominated society and raises her four daughters and helps them fulfil their ambitions. Her eldest daughter, Shalu, is expert in studies; the second, Bulbul, is a boxer; third, Muskaan, is an expert in mechanics and youngest, Tiya, plays football. Ranju once worked in a sewing center and Shalu started to work in a construction site to earn money. Guddu brings a marriage proposal for Shalu and the destiny bring Guddu, Ranju and their daughters face to face. Vishesh, who loves Shalu, also works there. Lalita envies the happy-go-lucky life of Ranju and her daughters. She damages the sewing center of Ranju and confiscates their house.

Then, the complete family of Ranju comes to live in Lalita's house which infuriates Lalita as Guddu's mother, Shanti and Ranju become closer to Guddu. She unsuccessfully tries to have Ranju and her daughters expelled from her house. Then, she obtains the whole property of Guddu Mishra on her name but Guddu Mishra discovers that she created Ranju's problems. Then, Guddu leaves Lalita and comes with Ranju and their family.

Lalita plans a suicide attempt to make Guddu return to her house and acts like that she has changed. Guddu leaves Ranju again for Lalita but this time he fully convinced and neither his concern for Ammaji, Ranju and their daughters ended yet and though being with Lalita, Lucky and Vicky Guddu remember Ranju and her brilliant childraising and compares it to Lalita's, which angers her. Meanwhile, Vishesh tells Shalu that he loves her but his father opposes the marriage. Rajveer Shukla is a new character who seeks vengeance against Bulbul for stopping his friend's marriage. He kidnaps Shalu and blackmails Ranju's family. Vishesh tries to save Shalu but fails and is also kidnapped. Then, Bulbul discovers Rajveer is behind this kidnapping, but Muskan is also kidnapped. Then, Rajveer tells Shalu to marry his friend to save Vishesh and Muskan and she agrees to do so. But Vishesh disguises himself as the bridegroom and marries Shalu.

== Cast ==
=== Main ===
- Reena Kapoor as Ranju Mishra – Guddu's wife; Shalu, Bulbul, Muskaan and Tiya's mother; Lucky and Vicky's step-mother. She is a traditional, benevolent and strong woman who keeps her family united. She owns and runs a tailoring shop named 'Pragati'.
- Ayub Khan as Guddu Mishra – Shanti's son; Ranju's husband; Lalita's ex-husband; Shalu, Bulbul, Muskaan, Tiya, Lucky and Vicky's father. He is wealthy and orthodox.
- Deepshikha Nagpal as Lalita Mishra – Guddu's ex-wife; Lucky and Vicky's mother; Shalu, Bulbul, Muskaan and Tiya's step-mother. She is a Bengali-orientated woman marries Guddu though they love each other but as Guddu wanted a son.

=== Recurring ===
- Jasjeet Babbar as Shanti Mishra - Guddu's mother; Shalu, Bulbul, Muskaan, Tiya, Lucky and Vicky's grandmother
- Monika Chauhan as Shalu Mishra – Ranju and Guddu's eldest daughter; Bulbul, Muskaan and Tiya's sister; Lucky and Vicky's half-sister
- Roopal Tyagi as Bulbul Mishra – Ranju and Guddu's second daughter; Shalu, Muskaan and Tiya's sister; Lucky and Vicky's half-sister
- Aarushi Sharma as Muskaan Mishra – Ranju and Guddu's third daughter; Shalu, Bulbul and Tiya's sister; Lucky and Vicky's half-sister
- Adiba Hussain as Tiya Mishra – Ranju and Guddu's youngest daughter; Shalu, Bulbul and Muskaan's sister; Lucky and Vicky's half-sister
- Karan Khandelwal as Lucky Mishra – Guddu and Lalita's elder son; Vicky's twin brother; Shalu, Bulbul, Muskaan and Tiya's half-brother
- Jeevansh Chadha as Vicky Mishra – Guddu and Lalita's younger son; Lucky's twin brother; Shalu, Bulbul, Muskaan and Tiya's half-brother
- Naveen Pandita as Vishesh – Shalu's husband
- Pooran Kiri as Mohan
- Ayush Saxena
- Amitt K. Singh as Rajveer
- Krishna Kant Singh Bundela as Baba
