= Kary Arora =

Indian DJ

- Born: Kary Arora; 7 January 1977 (age 49); Chandigarh, India
- Origin: Delhi, India
- Occupations: DJ; music composer
- Instruments: Turntable; sampler
- Years active: 1997–present
- Labels: T-Series; Power Play; Tito's; Moonlight; Spectral
- Website: djkary.com

Kary Arora (born 7 January 1977) is an Indian DJ. She is best known as India's first female DJ. Arora began DJing in 1997 and became the 5th female music composer in Bollywood. She ventured into music composition, writing lyrics, rapping, and grunge singing.

== Early life and education ==
Kary Arora was born in Chandigarh, India on 7 January 1977. Due to a lack of prestigious DJing schools in India in 1997, she joined Adersh Sound & Light Company in Delhi as a sound laborer/DJ for a 300 rupee wage to develop knowledge of digital audio mixing. She taught herself DJing in a year, while working different jobs in Delhi. Her training for music and keyboards happened under Guru Ravi Prakash. She studied Audio Engineering at SAE Institute in Chennai to improve her songwriting skills.

== Musical career ==
Arora began freelance DJing in 1997. Her first DJ residency was in club Temptation in Delhi from 1999 to 2000. She then joined Buzz-Delhi from 2001 to 2004, Flames in Le Meridian-Chennai in 2005, Buzz-Gurgaon, Delhi-NCR from 2006 to 2008 and until present she has been freelance performing in clubs across the globe.

In 2008, Arora composed her first single Funny Happy B'day to U for Meow Fm. In 2009, she composed a background score 48 Sec of Morning Melody for CNEB channel. Spectral Records released her two singles Sanware ki Dhun and De De Deedaar De in 2013. In 2013, she made her debut as music composer in Bollywood movie Satya 2 with her song Satya is Back Again In 2015, she composed Tinko ke Sahare, a song for the movie Angry Indian Goddesses.

== Awards and nominations ==
Limca Book of Records honored Arora as India's first woman DJ in 2014. In her residency, Buzz has been awarded of Best Bar with dancing in 2007 and Best Bar of the town in 2008 by Times Nightlife of India. Arora was featured in the documentary 360 Degree DJs, and was ranked as one of Delhi's top five DJs for two years.

== Discography ==
=== Soundtracks ===
Title	Details	Year
Satya Is Back Again	Movie: Satya 2; Music: Kary Arora; Lyricist: Kary Arora; Singers: Arsalaan Akhoon, Kary Arora; Dialogues: Makarand Deshpande; Director: Ram Gopal Varma; Producer: M Samanth Kumar Reddy; Label: T-Series; Formats: Digital download, CD	2013
Tinko Ke Sahare	Movie: Angry Indian Goddesses; Music: Kary Arora; Lyricist: Kary Arora; Singers: Kary Arora; Director: Pan Nalin; Producer: Gaurav Dhingra; Label: T-Series; Formats: Digital download, CD	2015

=== Remixes ===
Title	Details	Year
Babuji Dheeray Chalna Remix	Remix: Kary Arora; Singer: Samira Raza; Album: Rooh; Label: Moonlight Productions; Formats: Digital download, CD	2011
Do Lafzon Ki Hai Remix	Remix: Kary Arora; Singer: Sheena Chawla; Label: Powerplay Records; Formats: Digital download, CD	2011
Ishq Mein Ruswa Remix	Remix: Kary Arora; Singer: Anweshaa; Film: Dangerous Ishhq; Director: Vikram Bhatt; Label: T-Series; Formats: Digital download, CD	2012

=== Singles ===
Title	Details	Year
Sanware ki dhun me	Music, Singer: Kary Arora; Lyricist: Pooja; Genre: Lounge; Label: Spectral Records; Formats: Digital download, CD	2013
De De Deedaar De	Music, lyricist, Singer: Kary Arora; Genre: Bollywood Dance Music; Label: Spectral Records; Formats: Digital download, CD	2013

=== Background scores ===
Title	Details	Year
48 Sec of Morning Melody	Music, lyricist, Singer: Kary Arora; Producer: CNEB Pvt Ltd	2009
