= Rui Ka Bojh =

- Poster
- Directed by: Subhash Agrawal
- Produced by: NFDC
- Starring: Pankaj Kapoor; Reema Lagoo; Raghubir Yadav
- Cinematography: Mahesh Chandra
- Music by: K. Narayan
- Release date: 1997
- Running time: 117 min.
- Country: India
- Language: Hindi

Rui Ka Bojh (The Weight of Cotton) is a 1997 Hindi drama film directed by Subhash Agarwal, based on Chandra Kishore Jaiswal's novel Gawah Ghair Hazir with Pankaj Kapoor, Reema Lagoo and Raghubir Yadav in lead roles.

In 2013, to commemorate 100 years of Indian cinema, National Film Development Corporation of India (NFDC) released a digitally re-mastered print of the film under "Cinemas of India" label.

== Plot ==
Kishan Shah, a self-respecting, wise old man who, divides his property amongst his family and decides to stay with his youngest son, Ram Sharan. However, he is not able to get along with his son and daughter-in-law for long. Due to misunderstanding with his family he plans to renounce his family and the world forever and spend the rest of his life in a temple. But on the way to the temple he changes his mind and recalls the affection which his family gave to him and he decides to return.

== Cast ==
- Pankaj Kapoor as Kishan Shah
- Raghubir Yadav as Ram Sharan
- Reema Lagoo as Daughter-in-law
- Abha Parmar as younger Daughter-in-law
