= Jialal Vasant =

- Genres: Indian classical
- Occupation: Musician

Jialal Vasant was an Indian classical musician and music instructor. He was the founder of the Mumbai music school Acharya Jialal Vasant Sangeet Niketan. During his career as an instructor he taught a wide variety of students, including playback singers Suresh Wadkar and Vikas Bhalla. After his death, the school was taken over by his daughter, Prem Vasant, and Suresh Wadkar.

The Uttam Vaggayekar Jialal Vasant Award is named after Vasant. Initiated in 2000 by the Suresh Wadkar Ajivasan Music Academy, the ₹100,000 (US$1,100) award is given each year to an Indian vocalist, musician, composer, dancer, or lyricist.
