= Pyaar Mein Twist =

- Directed by: Hriday Shetty
- Written by: Sushma Ahuja
- Produced by: Rishi Kapoor
- Starring: Rishi Kapoor; Dimple Kapadia; Sammir Dattani; Soha Ali Khan; Kishori Shahane; Vikas Bhalla; Emma Bunton
- Music by: Jatin–Lalit
- Production company: Percept Picture Company
- Release date: 2 September 2005
- Running time: 160 minutes
- Country: India
- Language: Hindi
- Box office: ₹1.320 crore

Pyaar Mein Twist (English: A twist in love) is a 2005 Hindi-language romantic comedy film directed by Hriday Shetty and starring Rishi Kapoor, Dimple Kapadia, Sammir Dattani, Kishori Shahane, Vikas Bhalla and the British artist Emma Bunton.

== Synopsis ==
Yash Khurana is the chief executive and owner of Tejpal Industries, a hugely successful auto firm. Yash is stepping down as CEO in order to enjoy retirement. He gave the responsibility and authority to run the family business to his son, Rajiv, a well-trained highly educated but insecure executive, who feels the pressure of trying to fill his father's shoes in running the family business. While Yash is walking his dogs and crossing at a busy intersection, a car almost hits him. He is irate, calls the police, and berates the female driver, Sheetal, who, laughing, points out to the policeman that it is against the law to walk two dogs at the same time. When they get home, Yash and Sheetal each describe the day's main event to their families. Little do they realize that their paths will cross again.

They share more in common than either of them realize – each lost a spouse and is devoted to their families, putting them first in their lives and making great sacrifices to keep the families together. Sheetal is planning the marriage of her oldest daughter Riya to Sanju, the son of a wealthy upper-class family. Sanju's mother, Madhu, does not support his marriage and feels he is marrying beneath his social class. She is creating delays, hoping to break up their plans, but he defies his mother's authority and states he will elope with Riya if his family puts up obstacles. Sheetal and Yash meet again and feel they are in love. They go out on a date and are seen dancing and dining at a Moroccan restaurant. A friend of Madhu reports this to her, and she uses it as yet another excuse to delay the date of the marriage of her son.

The children of both Sheetal and Yash are irate over their relationship and suspect it may be a secret love affair of a long time carried on behind their backs. Toshi, Sheetal's sister-in-law, advises them to run away and travel together. After a while, their children are able to trace them, but Yash declares they want to marry each other, and everyone accepts it. Sanju ignores his mother and marries Riya. In the wedding, he meets Kylie Milligan, an international movie star hired by his mother to liven up the party, and shows interest in her, starting new confusions in his married life.

== Cast ==
- Rishi Kapoor as Yash Khurana
- Dimple Kapadia as Sheetal Arya
- Sameer Dattani as Sanju Loc
- Soha Ali Khan as Riya Arya
- Kishori Shahane as Madhu Loc
- Vikas Bhalla as Rajiv Khurana
- Emma Bunton as Kylie Milligan
- Harish Patel as Raj Loc
- Farida Jalal as Toshi Arya
- Delnaaz Paul as Dolly Arya
- Deepshika as Parul Rajiv Khurana
- Satish Shah as Karam Khanna

== Soundtrack ==
#	Title	Singer(s)
1	"Khullam Khulla Pyaar Karenge"	Babul Supriyo, Vinod Rathod
2	"Khullam Khulla" (Club Mix)	Babul Supriyo, Vinod Rathod
3	"Ladki Gori Ya Kaali"	Sonu Nigam, Sunidhi Chauhan
4	"Do Dil" (Male)	Babul Supriyo
5	"Do Dil" (Duet)	Babul Supriyo, Shreya Ghoshal
6	"Pal Tham Gaya Hai"	Abhijeet Bhattacharya, Alka Yagnik
7	"Pal Tham Gaya Hai" (Remix)	Abhijeet Bhattacharya, Alka Yagnik

== Reception ==
Indrani Roy Mitra of Rediff.com called the film "Good Stuff", writing, "Pyaar Mein Twist may not appeal to teenagers. For those on the wrong side of 40, however, it will touch a few chords. As for me, it was a tryst with long forgotten childhood stars. And that's always a good thing." The Telegraph wrote, "The acting by the rest of the cast is commendable. Vikas Bhalla makes a strong comeback as Rishi's son. Soha Ali Khan has a couple of scenes and she does them well. So does Sammir Dattani. Farida Jalal is lovely. Lifted or original, kudos to director Hriday Shetty for attempting a theme like this in the Bollywood scheme of things. Jatin-Lalit's music is a big letdown. Apart from Pal tham gaya, no song has any recall value. A good score could have worked wonders. The pacing is too slow, especially the second half. Two songs can be easily chopped off for smarter impact. Don't miss: Emma "Spice" Bunton making a special appearance in the sagaai song very early in the film. Last word: Go for the old wine in the old bottle itself after all, it's a taste that grows on you." Taran Adarsh of Bollywood Hungama gave the film 2.5 stars out of 5, writing, "On the whole, PYAAR MEIN TWIST is a cute film that charters a seldomly-treaded path vis-ï¿½-vis its story. At the box-office, it holds appeal for families mainly, although several new openers on the same date will result in the business getting divided."
