= Yeh Dooriyan =

- Theatrical Release Poster
- Directed by: Deepshikha Nagpal
- Screenplay by: Deepshikha Nagpal
- Story by: Deepshikha Nagpal
- Produced by: Deepshikha Nagpal
- Starring: Deepshikha Nagpal; Keshav Arora; Ayub Khan
- Edited by: Ballu Saluja
- Music by: Songs: Sajid–Wajid; Amjad Nadeem; Meet Bros Anjjan; Raju Singh; Background Score: Sanjoy Chowdhury
- Production company: V1 Creations
- Release date: 26 August 2011
- Running time: 107 minutes
- Country: India
- Language: Hindi

Yeh Dooriyan (transl. These distances) is a 2011 Indian romantic comedy film directed, produced and written by Deepshikha Nagpal. It stars Deepshikha Nagpal, Keshav Arora, Inder Kumar, Kunika, and Ayub Khan in the lead roles.

== Plot ==
Simi Nagpal (Deepshikha Nagpal), a 35-year-old independent and beautiful woman, runs a dance academy for a living. She is divorced and left with 2 children by her husband, Aditya Nagpal (Inder Kumar), to look after; the only problem is the societal pressures that ask her to remarry. She is clear that only if a man named Raj Arora (Keshav Arora) accepts her children will she marry.

== Cast ==
- Deepshikha Nagpal as Simi Aditya Nagpal
- Keshav Arora as Raj Arora
- Ayub Khan as Abhay
- Inder Kumar as Aditya Nagpal: Simi's ex–husband
- Achint Kaur as Pammi Vishal Mathur
- Rajesh Khera as Vishal Mathur: Pammi's husband
- Chitrashi Rawat as Nikki
- Kunickaa Sadanand as Mrs. Arora: Raj's Mother
- Delnaaz Paul as Bobby
- Salman Khan as himself
- Shishir Sharma as Simi's father
- Anita Wahi as Simi's mother
- Baby Vidhir as Guddu Nagpal: Simi and Aditya's son
- Master Vivak
- Bharat Bohra as Manager

== Reception ==
=== Critical reception ===
Komal Nahta of Koimoi gave it half out of five stars and wrote in his review – "On the whole, Yeh Dooriyan is a poor fare which will meet with a disastrous fate at the box-office windows". Nikhat Kazmi of Times of India gave it 2 out of 5 stars and wrote – "Deepshikha, on her part, does put in a restrained act as the suffering heroine, but can't say the same for the male acts. The men in the film are either hysterical (husband) or plastic (boyfriend) and the girlie gang (Delnaaz and Chitrashi) are borderline bimbettes". Taran Adarsh gave the film 2.5 stars out of 5, but called it "a decent attempt".

== Music ==
Yeh Dooriyan

Soundtrack album by Meet Bros Anjjan, Sajid–Wajid, Amjad Nadeem, Raju Singh
- Released: 22 July 2011
- Recorded: 2010–2011
- Studio: YRF Studios, Mumbai
- Genre: Feature film soundtrack, World music, Latin, Pop
- Length: 31:27
- Label: V1 Music
- Producer: Sajid–Wajid; Julius Packiam

Meet Bros Anjjan chronology
Do Dooni Chaar (2010)	Yeh Dooriyan (2011)	Kyaa Super Kool Hain Hum (2012)

Sajid–Wajid chronology
Chatur Singh Two Star (2011)	Yeh Dooriyan (2011)	Miley Naa Miley Hum (2011)

=== Track listings ===
Title	Singer(s)
"Ringa Ringa Roses"	Shweta Pandit
"Baat Jo Thi" (Yeh Dooriyan)	Omer Nadeem
"Mai Jabse Tujhse Mila" (Neend Nadarad)	Mika Singh
"I Wanna Be Your Lover" (Khushnuma)	Shaan & Gunjan
"Let’s Rock Sarsarahat"	Akriti Kakkar
"Ye Maula"	Krishna
"Ya Maula"	Kavita Seth
"Ringa Ringa Roses" (Remix)	Shweta Pandit
"Yeh Dooriyan" (Remix)	Omer Nadeem
"Mai Jabse Tujhse Mila" (Remix)	Mika Singh
"I Wanna Be Your Lover" (Remix)	Shaan & Gunjan
"Ye Maula" (Remix)	Krishna
"Baat Jo Thi Yeh Dooriyan" (Unplugged Studio Rehearsal)	Omer Nadeem

== Accolades ==
Award Ceremony	Category	Recipient	Result	Ref.(s)
4th Mirchi Music Awards	Upcoming Lyricist of The Year	Priya Panchal – "Baat Jo Thi…(Yeh Dooriyan)"	Nominated	
