= Dangerous Ishhq =

2012 film by Vikram Bhatt

- Theatrical Release Poster
- Directed by: Vikram Bhatt
- Written by: Amin Hajee
- Produced by: Reliance Entertainment; ASA Productions and Enterprises Pvt. Ltd.
- Starring: Karisma Kapoor; Rajneesh Duggal; Jimmy Sheirgill; Divya Dutta
- Narrated by: Karisma Kapoor
- Cinematography: Pravin Bhatt; 3D Stereographer; Michael Flax
- Music by: Himesh Reshammiya
- Production companies: Dar Motion Pictures; ASA Productions & Enterprises
- Distributed by: Reliance Entertainment
- Release date: 11 May 2012
- Running time: 130 minutes
- Country: India
- Language: Hindi
- Budget: ₹260 million
- Box office: ₹86.88 million

Dangerous Ishhq (transl. Dangerous love) is a 2012 Indian Hindi-language supernatural thriller film directed by Vikram Bhatt and starring Karisma Kapoor in the lead role. The filming began on 7 September 2010. The film was released on 11 May 2012. According to BoxOfficeIndia.com, the film was a box office flop. Critics praised Kapoor for her sincere and earnest portrayal, but criticized the film overall.

== Plot ==
The film's story spans four centuries and tells four different stories set in different time periods. Supermodel Sanjana and Rohan, son of one of the nation's foremost business tycoons, are a famous couple on the social circuit. When Sanjana decides against flying to Paris at the last minute for a lucrative modelling assignment, she does so, not just because she cannot bear to stay away from Rohan, but more importantly, because her instincts push her against going. Rohan gets abducted, and the high-profile kidnapping creates chaos in Sanjana's life. The kidnappers demand ₹ 500 million. The police, however, believe that even paying the ransom will not bring Rohan back. Shortly after, Sanjana starts hearing strange noises. She has visions of Rohan calling her Geeta. Meanwhile, Sanjana realises that she can read Urdu even though she has never learnt it. She informs her friend Dr. Neetu about it, who in turn refers her to a psychiatrist.

The latter informs Sanjana that Rohan's kidnapping is somehow linked to their past lives. Sanjana undergoes a past life regression where she sees herself as Geeta, a young Hindu girl in love with Iqbal, a Muslim boy. Her entire family, including her sister Chanda (who is none other than Neetu), has been killed by her uncle. Iqbal suggests that the only way Geeta can escape her death is by leaving Landi Kotal and settling down in Amritsar. Later, it is revealed that Iqbal's friend Aarif is the antagonist. His purpose is to separate the two lovers because he is a reincarnation of Durgam Sah, who decided to split the two many centuries ago.

Sanjana's next life is that of a Muslim girl, Salma, who loves a young man named Ali. The latter leaves for war with his companion Rashid. When the war is over, everyone returns except for Ali. Rashid informs Salma that her lover has been killed. It is later revealed by a tawaif (Neetu's first birth) that Ali is alive and that Rashid planned to separate the two lovers. With this particular regression, it is also revealed that Rohan's younger brother Rahul is involved in his brother's kidnapping.

Sanjana's final past life is that of a young queen's maid named Paro. She is secretly in love with Raj Dutt, while the Commander-in-Chief of Rajputana, Durgam Sah, also loves her. Durgam Sah asks her to marry him, or else he shall have Raj Dutt killed. She goes to him and confesses to having ingested poison so as to die untarnished by him. Watching her die, Durgam takes her to a psychic named Mantra, who reveals that due to the boon of Mirabai to Paro, the bonding of Paro and Raj Dutt is now unbreakable. They will be together forever in every life, to which Durgam replies that if there can be a reincarnation of Raj Dutt and Paro, he will also reincarnate. He asks Mantra to give him the power to remember everything regarding his current life so that he can continue to separate the two lovers in their successive lifetimes. Hence Durgam Sah, Rashid, and Aarif all have the same soul but different faces. Their only aim is to separate Sanjana and Rohan. The question remains: in which form did Durgam Sah take birth during the present life?

After going through all her lives, Sanjana decides to find out where Rohan is and who Durgam Sah has reincarnated as. She ultimately forms a plan and informs Neetu and a police officer about faking her death. Now declared dead by the doctor in front of ACP Singh and Neetu, it is shown that the new Durgam Sah is giving orders to his men to leave Rohan on his own as he will be dead in a few minutes. During the climax, it is finally revealed that ACP Singh is the new Durgam Sah. Sanjana recognises who ACP Singh is by a mark on his shoulder in a dangerous cat-and-mouse game. She then proceeds to wound him fatally. This breaks the cycle, and it is revealed that Sanjana and Rohan's souls will be together forever.

== Cast ==
- Karisma Kapoor in quadruple roles as
  - Sanjana
  - Geeta
  - Salma
  - Paro
- Rajneesh Duggal in quadruple roles as
  - Rohan
  - Iqbal
  - Ali
  - Raj Dutt
- Ravi Kishan as Durgam Sah
- Sameer Kochhar as Rashid (Durgam Sah's second life)
- Arya Babbar as Aarif (Durgam Sah's third life)
- Jimmy Sheirgill as Assistant Commissioner of Police Bhargav Singh (Durgam Sah's fourth and last life)
- Divya Dutta in quadruple roles as
  - Neetu
  - Chanda
  - Tawaif
  - Divya
- Ruslaan Mumtaz as Rahul Thakral
- Vikas Shrivastav as Inspector Arbaaz Sheikh
- Manish Malhotra in a cameo appearance playing himself
- Gracy Singh as Meera (Special Appearance in song "Lagan Lagi")
- Bikramjeet Kanwarpal
- Natasha Sinha as Mantra

== Production ==
This film marked the comeback of Karisma Kapoor after a break of six years.

== Reception ==
=== Critical reception ===
Rajeev Masand of CNN-IBN gave the movie 1.5 stars out of 5, noting that "Ambitious but seriously flawed, the film smacks of laziness in virtually all departments, and even Karisma Kapoor's earnest performance can't save the day. I'm going with one-and-a-half out of five for director Vikram Bhatt's 'Dangerous Ishq'. Plodding on for close to two hours and thirty minutes, this film will make you wish you'd knocked back a stiff one before taking your seat."

Kathika Kandpal of Filmfare gave the movie 2 stars out of 5, concluding that "Watch this and you might feel Karisma's Baaz – A Bird in Danger (2003) was a classic." Taran Adarsh of Bollywood Hungama gave the movie 1.5 stars out of 5, commenting that "On the whole, Dangerous Ishqq is no patch on Vikram Bhatt's earlier achievements. This fantasy-driven film is an epic disappointment!" Mansha Rastogi of Now Running gave the movie 1 star out of 5, quoting that "Dangerous Ishhq is definitely very dangerous... to your sensibilities! Beware!" Blessy Chettiar of DNA India gave the movie 1 star out of 5, writing that "Dangerous Ishhq is like watching a Dr Brian Weiss book in 3D, after about 30 pages, it gets monotonous and uninteresting. There's only so much curiosity you can have in somebody else's life. By the end of the ordeal you wish to be treated to a past life regression theory to find out what was it that drew you to it. Go curse your karma now." Shubhra Gupta of Indian Express gave the movie 0.5 stars out of 5, noting that "Karisma looks unbelievably trim for a 'do-bachchon-ki-amma', but that doesn't stop her from sliding all the way back into her familiar 90s style acting, where everything was over the top, from arch expressions to clothes to make-up. This is a terrible film, with not one redeeming factor."

=== Box office ===
It had opening day collections of ₹11 million (US$110,000). The second day collections were ₹12 million (US$120,000), taking the two-day total to ₹23 million (US$240,000). The third day collections were ₹15 million (US$160,000), taking the weekend total to ₹38 million (US$390,000). The film's final total was approximately ₹94 million (US$980,000) nett. Dangerous Ishhq grossed ₹2.6 million (US$27,000) in the overseas markets. Box Office India called it "one of the major flop of the year".

'Dangerous Ishhq' worldwide collections breakdown
Territory	Territory wise Collections break-up
India	Nett Gross: ₹55.5 million (US$580,000)
India	Distributor share: ₹28 million (US$290,000)
India	Total Gross: ₹105 million (US$1.1 million)
Worldwide	₹105 million (US$1.1 million)
Budget	₹260 million (US$2.7 million)

== Soundtrack ==
Dangerous Ishhq

Soundtrack album by Himesh Reshammiya
- Released: 16 April 2012
- Recorded: 2012
- Venue: Mumbai
- Genre: Film soundtrack
- Length: 55:08
- Label: T-Series
- Producer: Himesh Reshammiya

Himesh Reshammiya chronology
Damadamm! (2011)	Dangerous Ishhq (2012)	Bol Bachchan (2012)

The music of the film was composed by Himesh Reshammiya and the lyrics were penned by Sameer and Shabbir Ahmed. One remix was by Kary Arora.

#	Title	Singer(s)	Lyrics	Duration	Notes
1	"Tu Hi Rab Tu Hi Dua"	Rahat Fateh Ali Khan, Tulsi Kumar	Shabbir Ahmed	07:03	
2	"Naina Re"	Himesh Reshammiya, Shreya Ghoshal, Rahat Fateh Ali Khan	Sameer	05:32	
3	"Ishq Mein Ruswaa"	Anweshaa	Shabbir Ahmed	04:43	
4	"Umeed"	Amrita Kak, Shabab Sabri	Shabbir Ahmed	04:47	
5	"Lagan Laagi"	Shreya Ghoshal, Shabab Sabri	Shabbir Ahmed	06:09	
6	"Tu Hi Rab Tu Hi Dua" (R&B Mix)	Rahat Fateh Ali Khan, Tulsi Kumar	Shabbir Ahmed	04:46	Remixed by: Kiran Kamath
7	"Naina Re" (Remix)	Himesh Reshammiya, Shreya Ghoshal, Rahat Fateh Ali Khan	Sameer	04:28	Remixed by: Kiran Kamath
8	"Tu Hi Rab Tu Hi Dua" (Reprise)	Tulsi Kumar	Shabbir Ahmed	04:46	Mixed by: Kiran Kamath
9	"Umeed" (Remix)	Amrita Kak, Shahab Sabri	Shabbir Ahmed	04:04	Remixed by: DJ Sheizwood
10	"Naina Re" (Reprise)	Himesh Reshammiya, Shreya Ghoshal, Rahat Fateh Ali Khan	Sameer	05:31	
11	"Ishq Mein Ruswaa" (Remix)	Anweshaa	Shabbir Ahmed	03:13	Remixed by: Kary Arora
