= Revati (film) =

- Theatrical release poster
- Directed by: Faroogh A. Siddique
- Written by: Sunil Akhtar; Tapan A.Bhatt (Dialogue)
- Screenplay by: Faroogh A. Siddique
- Story by: Faroogh A. Siddique
- Produced by: Vikas M. Kate
- Starring: Kashmera Shah; Kiran Kumar; Ayub Kha; Vijay Kadam
- Cinematography: Akram Khan
- Edited by: Suresh Chaturvedi
- Music by: Jatin–Lalit; Nazakat Shujat
- Production company: Victory International
- Distributed by: Ultra Worldwide release
- Release date: 29 April 2005
- Running time: 142 minutes
- Country: India
- Language: Hindi
- Box office: ₹15 lakh

Revati is a 2005 Indian Hindi-language film written and directed by Farogh Siddique. The film stars Kashmera Shah.

== Plot ==
The story of a rebel trash picker living in the slums of Bombay, India. She dreams of being able to have simple luxuries like a bath or decent clothes to cover her body. One day she gets her opportunity through a drug smuggler in Bombay and quickly learns all that glitters is not gold. Whether it be a drug lord, a murderer, a rapist, or the legal system, Revati is a fighter who keeps a sense of humor about her plight. Revati shows the life struggles of a woman struggling to keep her morality and dignity in a place that tries hard to strip her of all she has in many extreme circumstances. Revati dares to be different and live by her own rules. Will she win and yet keep her morality? Will she survive?

== Cast ==
- Kashmera Shah
- Kiran Kumar
- Ayub Khan
- Vijay Kadam
- Shreyas Talpade as Chandu
- Herman Dsouza...police Inspector

== Music ==
1. Bijli Si Daude Anga Mere - Sunidhi Chauhan
2. Mehsoos Kar - Sona Kekhar
3. Mehsoos Kar (Remix) - Sona Kekhar
4. Mil Gayee Khwaab Ki Manzil - Shreya Ghoshal
5. Na Shikwa Karo - Kailash Kher
6. Pehle Jhagda Phir Ragda - Vinod Rathod
