= Marne Bhi Do Yaaron =

Film directed by Kashmira Shah

- Film poster
- Directed by: Kashmera Shah
- Written by: Kashmera Shah
- Produced by: Krushna Abhishek; Kashmera Shah
- Starring: Kashmera Shah; Rishaab Chauhaan; Krushna Abhishek
- Cinematography: Neelabh Kaul
- Edited by: Parth Y. Bhatt
- Music by: Rajendra Shivv
- Production company: Boo Filmz
- Release date: 15 November 2019
- Running time: 128 minutes
- Country: India
- Language: Hindi

Marne Bhi Do Yaaron is a Hindi-language film directed by Kashmera Shah and released on 15 November 2019.

== Plot ==
Raj Kiran, an ambitious young man, wishes to work overseas and make a life for himself there. With the help of some agents and most of his father's life-savings, he manages to acquire a visa to Greece but falls prey to their trap as his visa is just a tourist visa on which he cannot work. A devastated Raj decides to commit suicide. As he gets started on his suicide attempt, he cannot get himself to actually commit the act. Then, he meets Anita, a bystander who watches him during one of his suicide attempts. Seeing Raj fail, Anita offers to help him to commit suicide for money, to which he agrees. Their out of the world acquaintance brings on a journey of bizarre suicide attempts and madness.

== Cast ==
- Krushna Abhishek as Samay / Time
- Kashmera Shah as Anita Raj
- Rishaab Chauhaan as Raj Kiran
- Kishwer Merchant as Sunny
- Pawan Singh as Honey
- Lalit Bhardwaj as Lalit
- Vinod Gaikar as JD
- Kiran Kumar as RajKiran's Father
- Rajesh Puri as Dharam - Hotel Manager

== Reception ==
Pallabi Dey Purkayastha of Times of India called the screenplay "haphazard from the very first frame that goes on to prove that this comedy flick lacks the sharpness of a seasoned storyteller".
