= Miit (TV series) =

- A promotional logo image of "Miit".
- Directed by: Anurag Basu
- Starring: See below
- Country of origin: India
- Original language: Hindi
- No. of episodes: 152

Production
- Producers: Subhroto Bose & Deepshikha Bose
- Running time: approx. 24 minutes

Original release
- Network: Zee TV
- Release: 19 January – 8 October 2003

Miit is a Hindi-language Indian television series that aired on Zee TV channel from 19 January 2003 to 8 October 2003 from Sunday to Wednesday. The show is based on the novel Noukadubi, written by the Indian poet Rabindranath Tagore in 1905. It follows the concept of mistaken identities, where a woman is thought to be someone who died in a train mishap.

== Concept ==
The story is based on the lives of two couples: Akash and Shruti, and Sankalp and Aastha. Destiny plays a strange trick on them and their lives become hopelessly intertwined.

Sankalp and Shruti are doctors working in the same hospital. Sankalp feels attracted to Shruti. However, he withdraws when he learns that Shruti has a boyfriend named Akash. Shruti and Akash come from very different backgrounds; so, their families object to their relationship. But the lovers are determined to be together. Meanwhile, Sankalp goes to attend the wedding of Aastha, his best friend Alok's sister. However, certain circumstances arise to cancel the wedding. Then Sankalp offers to marry Aastha, even though he has never had even a glimpse of her face. In the meantime, Shruti's family members pressurize her to marry a man of their choice. A dejected Akash, thinking that he has lost Shruti, agrees to marry a girl, Nupur, chosen by his parents. Meanwhile, Shruti rejects the alliance proposed by her family.

On a fateful night, Akash and Sankalp, respectively accompanied by their newly-wedded wives, Nupur and Aastha, board the train. Neither husband has yet seen his wife's face. Both brides are wearing red wedding dresses, their faces covered with veils. As luck would have it, the trains in which these couples are riding collide and there is a terrible crash. Both Sankalp and Akash survive and start searching for their wives. On one hand, Sankalp finds Nupur’s dead body and mistakes it for that of Aastha. He claims the body and performs the final rites. Unfortunately, Akash’s father and other relatives are dead. Akash finds an unconscious Aastha, and mistakes her for his wife Nupur. He takes her to the nearest hospital. After several hours Aastha gains consciousness but suffers from memory loss. Akash takes Aastha home and nurses her devotedly. Soon, he learns that Aastha is not his wife.

In the meantime, Shruti and Akash meet again. They are overjoyed to know that they are still single and free to be with each other. However, Shruti sees Aastha and begins to doubt Akash's loyalty. Sankalp consoles Shruti and she begins to trust him more as time passes. Aastha still remembers nothing; she believes that she is Nupur and Akash is her husband; she becomes emotionally attached to him.

== Cast ==
- Vikas Bhalla as Akash
- Deepa Parab as Aastha / Nupur / Anjali
- Hiten Tejwani as Akash
- Rajsingh Verma as Dr. Sankalp
- Preeti Mehra as Dr. Shruti
- Aashish Kaul as Dr. Alok
- Uday Tikekar as Dinesh
- Neelu Kohli as Dr. Shruti's mother
