= Shanno Ki Shaadi =

- Genre: Sitcom
- Directed by: Rajiv Mehra
- Starring: Divya Dutta; Vikas Bhalla
- Country of origin: India
- Original language: Hindi
- No. of seasons: 1

Production
- Production company: UTV Motion Pictures

Original release
- Network: StarPlus
- Release: 7 August 2005 – 2006

Shanno Ki Shaadi (transl. Shanno's Wedding) is an Indian Hindi sitcom which aired on StarPlus from 7 August 2005 to 2006 on Sunday and later weekend nights. It is based on the American film My Big Fat Greek Wedding. Produced by UTV Motion Pictures, it starred Divya Dutta and Vikas Bhalla. Initially aired on Sunday nights only, since December 2005, it became biweekly.

== Plot ==
Set in the backdrop of Punjab, the series follows the journey of a 26 year old, simple and ordinary girl, Shanno, who is unmarried and loves to make Parathas (flat bread) in her father's Dhaba. She loses her interest in marriage on not finding a suitable groom for her while her family is keen for her marriage as soon as possible. Soon, she crosses paths with a NRI Sindhi man Arjun and they both fall in love after many confusions. They soon get married and their life goes on.

== Cast ==
- Divya Dutta as Shanno Mrs Arjun Sadarangani Shano ki Season 2
- Vikas Bhalla as Arjun Sadarangani
- Kulbhushan Kharbanda as Shantilal Halwai: Shanno's father
- Shoma Anand as Swaran: Shanno's mother
- Kamini Kaushal as Bebe: Shanno's grandmother
- Rajendra Mehra as Nanhelal
- Neelu Kohli as Kaanta: Shanno's aunt
- Shilpa Saklani as Shalu: Shanno's childhood friend
- Karan Veer Mehra as Kunnu
- Shagufta Ali as Mrs. Sadarangani: Arjun's mother
- Darshan Jariwala as Mr. Sadarangani: Arjun's father
- Ravee Gupta

== Reception ==
The Tribune stated, "Star’s shanno Ki Shaadi looks far less shambolic. We’re happy to see the ultra-gifted Divya Dutta back on the medium. She has a way of lighting up the medium. Most of the characters are true to life. And the sequences revolving around a Punjabi wedding add to the credibility of the sitcom."

Rediff stated, "The show's USP appears to be its simplicity and the way the audience can relate to the characters."
