= Reena Kapoor =

Indian television actress

- Occupations: Actress; model
- Years active: 1990–2023
- Known for: Woh Rehne Waali Mehlon Ki; Shakti – Astitva Ke Ehsaas Ki; RadhaKrishn
- Spouse: Karan Nijher
- Relatives: Shalini Kapoor Sagar, Malini Kapoor (cousins)

Reena Kapoor is an Indian actress who mainly works in Hindi television and is best known for her role as Rani and Pari in Rajshri Production's Popular television show Woh Rehne Waali Mehlon Ki which aired on Sahara One from 2005 to 2011. She is also known for her role as Nimrit in Colors TV's in Shakti – Astitva Ke Ehsaas Ki and Ranju in Ranju Ki Betiyaan. She has starred in devotional serials Vishnu Puran, Jai Ganga Maiya, Jai Mahalakshmi, RadhaKrishn and many more.

== Filmography ==
=== Films ===
- 1998 Hero Hindustani as Aasma
- 2000 Kya Kehna as Anju
- 2002 Duplicate Sholay

=== Television ===
Year	Show	Role
1990	Yeh Hui Naa Baat	Madhuri
1992	Parivartan	
1995–2001	Aahat	Various characters
1997–1999	Saturday Suspense	
1997–1998	Safar	Neelam
1997–2001	Om Namah Shivay	Vishnupriya Devi Lakshmi
1998	Jai Ganga Maiya	Goddess Ganga
1998-1999	X Zone	
1998–1999	Rishtey	Shikha
1998-1999	C.I.D.	
2000-2001	Jai Mahalakshmi	Devi Mahalakshmi
2000-2008	Kahani Ghar Ghar Ki	Srishti
2000	Gubbare	Tina
2001 -2002	Vishnu Puran	Sita
2001-2005	Dishayen	Sonia
2002–2004	Devi	Kavita Sharma / Kavita Vasudev Kumar
2003	Kise Apna Kahein	Noor
2003	Aap Beeti	Karuna
2004	Dekho Magar Pyaar Se	Kaya
2005–2006	Woh Rehne Waali Mehlon Ki	Rani Mittal / Rani Raj Goel / Rani Prince Thapar
2006–2008	Woh Rehne Waali Mehlon Ki	Pari Thapar / Pari Saumya Parashar / Pari Manav Kumar
2008–2011	Woh Rehne Waali Mehlon Ki	Dr. Rani Kumar / Dr. Rani Rishabh Rathore / Dr. Rani Rishabh Johri
2006	Ssshhhh...Koi Hai	sheetal
2008	Saas v/s Bahu	Contestant
2014	Aur Pyaar Ho Gaya	Sangeeta "Bhavana" Kapoor / Sangeeta "Bhavana" Suket Khandelwal
2015	Badii Devrani	Prabha Poddar
2016	Shakti - Astitva Ke Ehsaas Ki	Nimmi Manendra Singh
2018–2019	RadhaKrishn	Yashoda
2021	Ranju Ki Betiyaan	Ranju Guddu Mishra
2022–2023	Dheere Dheere Se	Bhavana Deepak Shastri
