= Steal Ur Girlfriend =

Indian reality show

- Created by: Channel V India
- Creative director: Aapar Gupta
- Presented by: Kashmera Shah
- Country of origin: India
- Original language: Hindi

Production
- Running time: 60 minutes

Original release
- Network: Channel V
- Release: 13 November 2011 – present

Steal Ur Girlfriend is an Indian reality show aired on Channel[V], every Sunday at 7 pm. In the show the participants are helped by the host Kashmera Shah and the Channel V team in getting back with his or her lost love.
