= Aur Pappu Paas Ho Gaya =

- Poster
- Directed by: Shyam Soni
- Produced by: Amit Srivastava
- Starring: Kashmera Shah; Krishna Abhishek; Jackie Shroff
- Cinematography: Hasmukh Rajput
- Edited by: Santosh Pawar
- Music by: Ravi Chopra
- Production company: Real Square Production
- Release date: 20 April 2007
- Country: India
- Language: Hindi

Aur Pappu Pass Ho Gaya (lit. 'And Pappu has passed') is a 2007 Indian comedy film directed by Shyam Soni and produced by Amit Srivastava. The film stars Krishna Abhishek and Kashmira Shah.

== Plot ==
Daydreamer Pappu (Krishna Abhishek) lives a poor lifestyle with his mom and dad in a village in India. In order to better his prospects, he relocates to Bombay and finds a job as a mechanic in Sardar Tara Singh's garage. He meets and falls in love with Kiran Chauhan (Kashmera Shah), who is the sister of the dreaded gangster, Sudhakar Chauhan (Jackie Shroff), and lives a very wealthy lifestyle surrounded by bodyguards. Pappu feigns that he is really a runaway Prince of Trikamgarh, worms his way into Kiran's heart, and also wins over Sudhakar and their grandmother. When Sudhakar asks Pappu to bring his father to finalize the marriage, he asks Tara to be his dad, to which he agrees, and in this way fooling Sudhakar and Kiran. When Tara borrows money from Pathan (Mushtaq Khan) to enable Pappu to live a princely lifestyle, they are unable to repay this debt, but help comes unexpectedly from the real Raja of Trikamgarh, who also travels to finalize his son's marriage - much to Pappu's surprise. Things spiral out of control when Pappu's real father and mother also decide to pay their son a visit.

== Cast ==
- Krishna Abhishek as Pappu
- Kashmera Shah as Kiran Chauhan
- Jackie Shroff as Sudhakar 'Sudhabhai' Chauhan
- Sikandar Kharbanda as Biloo
- Alok Nath as Pappu's dad
- Mushtaq Khan as Pathan
- KK Goswami

== Music ==
=== Track listing ===
No.	Title	Singer(s)	Length
1.	"Meri Chahaton Ki"	Abhijeet	5:23
2.	"Pappu Paas Ho Gaya"	Abhijeet	4:08
3.	"Jaane Jaana"	Kunal Ganjawala, Alka Yagnik	5:23
4.	"Keep It Cool"	Bali Brahmbhatt	4:14
5.	"Paaji Ghanti Baji"	Sandeep Garg, Amit Shrivastav	5:37
6.	"Ishq Hai Jua"	Sonu Kakkad	5:12
