= Chehraa (1999 film) =

- Written by: Gautam Adhikari
- Directed by: Gautam Adhikari
- Starring: Ayub Khan; Madhoo
- Music by: Anu Malik
- Country of origin: India
- Original language: Hindi

Production
- Producer: Markand Adhikari
- Cinematography: Patni Brothers
- Editor: Atul Bhatt

Original release
- Release: 1999

Chehraa is a 1999 Indian Hindi television thriller film directed by Gautam Adhikari and produced by Markand Adhikari. It was a telefilm premiered in DD National.

== Cast ==
- Ayub Khan as Avinash Saxena
- Madhoo as Simran
- Varsha Usgaonkar as Menka
- Seema Kapoor as Jyoti
- Anjana Mumtaz

== Production ==
The film's budget was ₹ 1 crore and was completed within 30 days.

== Music ==
#	Title	Singer(s)
1	"Had Se Zyada Aati Hai"	Kumar Sanu, Alka Yagnik
2	"Chehra Apna Dekhte Hai"	Kumar Sanu, Alka Yagnik
3	"Dil Bhi Bhara Nahin"	Shankar Mahadevan, Jaspinder Narula
4	"Ek To Aisi Ladki"	Kumar Sanu, Alka Yagnik
5	"Tere Badan Mein"	Kumar Sanu, Alka Yagnik
6	"Sach Much Mein To"	Kumar Sanu, Alka Yagnik
