= Sanjay (film) =

- Directed by: Shahrukh Sultan
- Written by: Rajeev Agarwal
- Produced by: Farhan Mirza; Tess Mirza
- Starring: Ayub Khan; Sakshi Shivanand
- Music by: Shyam-Surender
- Release date: 15 September 1995
- Country: India
- Language: Hindi

Sanjay is a 1995 Indian drama film directed by Shahrukh Sultan and produced by Farhan Mirza and Tess Mirza. It stars Ayub Khan and Sakshi Shivanand in lead roles.

== Plot ==
Sanjay (Ayub Khan) lives in a middle-class family. His father, Ranveer (Paresh Rawal), a retired constable; his mother is a housewife; his elder brother, Pratap (Shakti Kapoor), is married and has one son; and his sister is yet to marry. Ranveer's philosophy is to accept bribes and this is what he teaches his constable son. But Pratap prefers to be honest. Sanjay meets with and the falls in love with beautiful Sakshi (Sakshi Shivanand), who is the daughter of the Deputy Superintendent of Police. Then things go well with the Singh household, Pratap gets promoted to the position of Inspector, and a political leader (Sadashiv Amrapurkar) gives the Singh family a bungalow to live in. The family is all set to enjoy a comfortable life, when Sanjay discovers that all this luxury and comfort has come to them at a price - a price that each of the Singh family will have to pay collectively and individually.

== Cast ==
- Ayub Khan as Sanjay Singh
- Sakshi Shivanand as Sakshi
- Shakti Kapoor as Pratap Singh
- Paresh Rawal as Ranveer Singh
- Sadashiv Amrapurkar as Political Leader
- Mukesh Rishi Jagtap
- Goga Kapoor as Professor
- Jassi Singh as Rana

== Music ==
Song	Singer	Lyricist
"Tumko Hai Meri Kasam"	Kumar Sanu	Anwar Sagar
"Hum Aur Tum Tum Aur Hum"	Kumar Sanu, Kavita Krishnamurthy	Gauhar Kanpuri
"Humko Tumse Pyar Hai"	Udit Narayan, Kavita Krishnamurthy	Sateesh
"Pardesi Aaya"	Vinod Rathod, Kavita Krishnamurthy	Gauhar Kanpuri
"Jeevan Mein Ho Pyar"	Udit Narayan, Kavita Krishnamurthy	Faiz Anwar
"Raat Chhoti Baat Badi"	Udit Narayan, Kavita Krishnamurthy	Sateesh
