= Sakshi Shivanand =

Indian actress

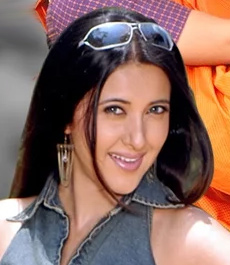
- Sakshi Shivanand in 2006
- Born: South Africa
- Occupation: Actress
- Years active: 1993–2014
- Relatives: Shilpa Anand (sister)

Sakshi Shivanand is an Indian actress, who has appeared in Telugu, Hindi, Kannada, and Tamil films. Her most notable work is Aapko Pehle Bhi Kahin Dekha Hai which was directed by Anubhav Sinha and co-starred Priyanshu Chatterjee, Om Puri and Farida Jalal. She has also lent her voice to Cinderella in The Story of Cinderella, an animation television series telecast in India on Just Kids! on Sahara TV.

== Early life ==
Shivanand was born in South Africa in a Kannadiga family. She once claimed that her ancestors hailed from Kakinada, though the veracity of this claim is disputed.

== Career ==
Shivanand made her Hindi debut in 1996. During her early career, she starred in the Aditya Pancholi-starrer Zanjeer (1998). She gained fame in Telugu cinema. She debuted with a small role in a Telugu film named Anna Vadina in 1993 which has Krishnam Raju and Jaya Prada in the lead. Her breakthrough role was in 1997 with Master. She has acted with Nagarjuna in Seetharamaraju, Balakrishna in Vamsoddharakudu, Rajasekhar in Simharasi, Mahesh Babu in Yuvaraju, Abbas in Rajahamsa and opposite Mohan Babu in Collector Garu and Yamajathakudu. She performed an item song in the 2008 film Homam which was directed by J.D. Chakravarthy.

Her younger sister Shilpa Anand is also television actress.

== Filmography ==
Year	Title	Role	Language	notes
1993	Anna Vadina	Radha (Menaka)	Telugu	
1995	Janam Kundli	Madhu	Hindi	
1995	Sanjay		Hindi	
1996	Papa Kehte Hai		Hindi	
1996	Indra Prastham		Malayalam	Special appearance
1997	Jeeo Shaan Se		Hindi	
1997	Pudhayal	Swapna	Tamil	
1997	Master	Kaanchanaa	Telugu	
1997	Mappillai Gounder	Priya	Tamil	
1997	Collector Garu		Telugu	
1998	Rajahamsa	Sanjana	Telugu	
1998	Nidhi		Telugu	
1998	Priyuralu		Telugu	Dubbed in Malayalam as Manjeeradhwani and in Tamil as Kanmani Oru Kavithai
1998	Zanjeer	Kavita	Hindi	
1998	Snehithulu	Sirisha	Telugu	
1999	Iddaru Mitrulu	Anitha	Telugu	
1999	Samudram	Rajyalakshmi	Telugu	
1999	Seetharama Raju		Telugu	
1999	Pellivaramandi		Telugu	
1999	Yamajathakudu	Sirisha	Telugu	
2000	Vamsoddarakudu	Surekha	Telugu	
2000	Krodh	Seema	Hindi	
2000	Yuvaraju	Srivalli	Telugu	
2000	Galate Aliyandru		Kannada	
2000	Maa Pelliki Randi	Anjali	Telugu	
2000	Pelli Sambandham		Telugu	
2001	Vaanchinathan	Divya	Tamil	
2001	Simharasi	Rajeswari	Telugu	
2001	Vedham	Seetha	Tamil	
2002	Naanu Naane	Arathi	Kannada	
2002	Sainika	Gauri	Kannada	
2002	Kodanda Rama	Meenakshi	Kannada	
2002	Khalnayakon Ka Khalnayak		Hindi	
2003	Aapko Pehle Bhi Kahin Dekha Hai	Pakhi	Hindi	
2003	Khushi		Hindi	Special appearance
2004	Maanasthan	Raasathi	Tamil	
2006	Thandege Thakka Maga	Bhanu	Kannada	
2007	Jahan Jaaeyega Hamen Paaeyega	Anju Khanna	Hindi	
2007	Soundarya	Soundarya	Kannada	
2008	Homam		Telugu	
2010	Ranga The Donga		Telugu	
2013	Aadhi Bhagavan		Tamil	Special appearance
2014	Paramashiva		Kannada	
TBA	Dillagi... Yeh Dillagi	TBA	Hindi	Unreleased

== Music video ==
- Hum Ko To Hai Poora Yakeen made by msn cricket and sports MSN India on The Indian Cricket team for the ICC Cricket World Cups in 2003
