= Taaqat (1995 film) =

- Theatrical release poster
- Directed by: Talat Jani
- Written by: Talat Jani
- Produced by: Mansoor Ahmad Siddiqui
- Starring: Dharmendra; Shatrughan Sinha; Kajol; Vikas Bhalla
- Cinematography: Kishore Kapadia
- Edited by: Vilas Ranade; Deepak Wirkud
- Music by: Anand–Milind
- Release date: 23 June 1995
- Running time: 164 minutes
- Country: India
- Language: Hindi
- Budget: ₹17.5 million
- Box office: ₹25.3 million

Taaqat is a 1995 Indian Hindi-language romantic crime film directed and written by Talat Jani, starring Dharmendra, Shatrughan Sinha, Kajol and Vikas Bhalla. It revolves on two influential gangsters working for opposite political parties.

== Cast ==
Cast adapted from Box Office India:

- Dharmendra as Shakti Singh
- Shatrughan Sinha as Bhau
- Kajol as Kavita
- Vikas Bhalla as Aklakh
- Farah Naaz as Savitri
- Kader Khan as Master Dinanath
- Mukesh Khanna as Khushwant Singh Bedi
- Aasif Sheikh as Maniya
- Raju Shrestha as Devdas
- Dinesh Hingoo as Anirudh
- Ishrat Ali as Anna
- Rajendra Gupta as Anil Rege
- Deep Dhillon as Irfan
- Suhas Joshi as Dinanath's wife

== Soundtrack ==
The song Hun Huna, tuned by Anand–Milind, written by Sameer and rendered by Kumar Sanu and Poornima, was popular during the release.

#	Title	Singer(s)
1	"Dandiye Ke Bahane"	Udit Narayan, Sadhana Sargam
2	"Patthar Pe Likhi Koi"	Kumar Sanu, Sadhana Sargam
3	"Mere Chehre Pe Likha"	Udit Narayan, Alka Yagnik
4	"Hun Huna Re Hun Huna"	Kumar Sanu, Poornima
5	"Kaisee Hai Dil Ki Lagi"	Kumar Sanu, Alka Yagnik
6	"Love Me Love Me"	Udit Narayan, Poornima
7	"Mera Dil Tujh Pe Marta"	Udit Narayan, Alka Yagnik
