= Deepshikha Nagpal =

Indian television actress (born 1977)

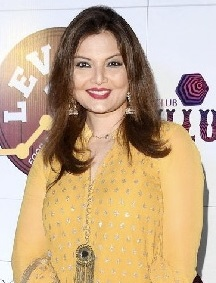
- Deepshikha in 2020
- Born: 20 August 1977 (age 49); Mumbai, Maharashtra, India
- Other name: Deepshikha
- Occupations: Actress; film director; film writer
- Years active: 1994–present
- Spouse: Jeet Upendra (m. 1997; div. 2005) Keshav Arora (m. 2012)
- Children: Vedhika Upendra; Vivaan Upendra

Deepshikha Nagpal, also known as Deepshikha, is an Indian actress and film director who mainly works in Hindi-language films and Hindi television productions. She has starred in several successful Hindi films including Koyla, Baadshah, Dillagi and Partner. She was a contestant on Colors TV's reality show Bigg Boss Season 8 in 2014.

She received acclaim in the Hindi film industry after the release of Koyla. She also appeared in the Hindi film Dhoom Dadakka with Satish Kaushik. She has also acted in a number of TV soaps. Her debut film as a director, Yeh Dooriyan, was released in 2011.

== Personal life ==
Deepshikha was born in Mumbai, Maharashtra. Deepshika married Jeet Upendra and has two children, but after ten years they divorced. In January 2012, she married Indore-based Keshav Arora, who had been her co-actor in her directorial debut Yeh Dooriyan.

She appeared on Season 8 of the Colors reality show Big Boss, and was evicted on the 21st day.

== Filmography ==
=== Films ===
Year	Film	Role	Notes
1994	Gangster		Debut Film
1994	Betaaj Badshah	Girl saved by Arjun	
1995	Rani Hindustani	Ganga / Mohini	
1995	Dance Party		
1997	Police Station		
1997	Koyla	Bindya	
1998	Barsaat Ki Raat		
1998	Manmohini		
1999	Teri Mohabbat Ke Naam	Manju	
1999	Sirf Tum		Item song "Patli Kamar"
1999	Monisha En Monalisa		Tamil Film
1999	Kahani Kismat Ki		
1999	Jaanam Samjha Karo	Girl in Temple	
1999	Baadshah	Rani	
1999	Dillagi		
2000	Dard Pardesaan De	Kamal / Dolly	Punjabi Film
2000	Hatyari		
2000	Agniputra		
2000	Parshuram		Gujrati Film
2000	Sajan Haiye Sambhare		Gujrati Film
2002	Rishtey	The Seductress	
2004	Dukaan: Pila House	Shyama (bride)	
2005	Pyaar Mein Twist	Parul Arya	
2005	Ago Chumma Deda Rajaji		Bhojpuri Film
2006	Maut ka Saudagar	Lavanya Dinega	
2006	Corporate		
2006	Mohtyachi Renuka	Preeti	Marathi film
2007	Red Swastik	Sarika	
2007	Partner	Pammi	
2007	Lara		
2007	Samaya Hathare Dori	Item Dancer	Odia Film
2008	Dhoom Dadakka	Rambha J. English	
2008	Bhram: An Illusion	Sunita Sharma	
2008	Mate Ani Dela Lakhye Faguna	Shikha	Odia film
2008	Pranali: The Tradition	Chanda	
2009	Tukya Tukwila Nagya Nachwila		Marathi film
2009	Made In China		Marathi film
2010	Wanted		Bengali Film
2011	Yeh Dooriyan	Simi	Also director, producer, writer, dialogue and screenplay writer
2011	Gandhi to Hitler		
2013	Just U & Me		Punjabi Film
2015	Second Hand Husband	Kaajal	
2017	Raktdhar		
2018	Teri Bhabhi Hai Pagle		
2019	One Day: Justice Delivered	Dr. Reena Chopra	
2025	Bombay	Rekha Bharadwaj	

=== Television ===
Year	Serial	Role	Notes
1993	Kanoon	Maggie	Episodic role
1996	Dastaan E Hatimtai	Neelam Pari (Fairy)	Cameo appearance / Narrator
1998	Shaktimaan	Paroma	Supporting role
1998	Shaktimaan	Sherali	Supporting role
1999	Suraag – The Clue	Inspector Sneha Verma	Episodic role
2000	Vishnu Puran	Suruchi	Supporting role
2001	Suraag – The Clue	Damini	Episodic role
2001	Suraag – The Clue	Kamini Roy	Episodic role
2000–2004	Son Pari	Ruby	
2002	Ramayan	Sulochana	Supporting role
2002	Ssshhhh...Koi Hai	Zalima	Episodic role
2002	Suraag – The Clue	Avantika Darshan Kashyap	Episodic role
2002	Suraag – The Clue	Tanya Rai	Episodic role
2002	Suraag – The Clue	Champa	Episodic role
2002	Suraag – The Clue	Imposter Tanya Rai	Episodic role
2002	Suraag – The Clue	Inspector Kiran Mehra	Episodic role
2002	Ssshhhh...Koi Hai – Vikraal Aur Zaalima	Zaalima	Episodic role
2002–2004	Kittie Party	Kuku Nagpal	Lead role
2003	Shararat	Riya	Episodic role
2003–2004	Karishma – The Miracles of Destiny	Sanjana	
2005	A.D.A.	Anita	Lead role
2006	CID – Maut Ka Saudagar	Lavanya Dinega	Episodic role
2006	CID – The Invisible Eye Witness	Vyoma Sudeep Kumar	Episodic role
2006–2007	Kashmakash Zindagi Ki	Aradhana	Supporting role
2005–2009	Baa Bahoo Aur Baby	Ichcha	Cameo
2008	Dancing Queen	Herself	Contestant
2012–2013	Hongey Judaa Na Hum	Tara Avinash Duggal	Supporting role
2013	Nach Baliye 5	Herself; contestant	Finished in 11th place with husband Keshav Arora
2013	Baal Veer	Bawander Pari	
2014	Madhubala – Ek Ishq Ek Junoon	Pam Harshwardhan Kapoor	
2014	Bigg Boss 8	Contestant	Evicted on Day 21, 12 October 2014
2015	Yam Hain Hum	Badi Bindu Maam	Supporting role
2015	Mushkil Samme Mein	Toral	
2016	Janbaaz Sindbad	Shalaka	
2016	Adhuri Kahaani Hamari	Maha Dayaan	
2016	Ek Tha Raja Ek Thi Rani	Abida	
2017	Peshwa Bajira	Zeb-Un-Nisa	
2017	Santoshi Maa	Kranti Maa	
2017	Crime Patrol	Devyani Patrick Banerjee	
2018	Khichdi Returns	Dr.Tilottama Dhakdhaki	Episodic role
2019	Main Bhi Ardhangini	Neelambari Thakur / Mahamaya	
2019	Phir Laut Aayi Naagin	Kanchan	
2021	Ranju Ki Betiyaan	Lalita Guddu Mishra	
2022–2023	Na Umra Ki Seema Ho	Satyavati Shantanu Raichand	Supporting role
2023	Palkon Ki Chhaon Mein 2	Maya	Negative role
2024–2025	Megha Barsenge	Goldie Khurana	Supporting role
2025	Ishq Jabariya	Devi Sahay	Negative role

=== Web series ===
Year	Name	Role	Notes
2024	Raisinghani VS Raisinghani	Nina Walia	
