= Daadagiri =

1997 film by Arshad Khan

- Promotional Poster
- Directed by: Arshad Khan
- Produced by: Hiren Bafna; Mahesh Garg; Shreeram Goyal
- Starring: Mithun Chakraborty; Ayub Khan; Rituparna Sengupta; Simran; Nishigandha Wad; Shakti Kapoor; Puneet Issar
- Music by: Dilip Sen-Sameer Sen
- Production company: Shree Durga Laxmi Enterprises
- Release date: 8 August 1997
- Running time: 138 minutes
- Country: India
- Language: Hindi

Daadagiri (transl. Rowdyism) is a 1997 Indian Hindi-language action film directed by Arshad Khan starring Mithun Chakraborty, Ayub Khan, Rituparna Sengupta, Simran, Nishigandha Wad, Shakti Kapoor and Puneet Issar.

== Plot ==
Ajay and Amar Saxena were separated from their sister Uma and their father at a young age. Now grown up, they are con men, and on the look out for Dhanraj and Jagraj who they suspect killed their father and sister.

== Cast ==
- Mithun Chakraborty as Ajay Saxena
- Ayub Khan as Amar Saxena
- Rituparna Sengupta as Asha Verma
- Simran as Uma
- Nishigandha Wad as Radha Sinha
- Shakti Kapoor as ACP Pratap Sinha
- Puneet Issar as Dhanraj
- Aasif Sheikh as Monty
- Kader Khan as Dinanath
- Ranjeet as Marshal
- Raza Murad as Jagraj
- Yunus Parvez as Mamaji
- Himani Shivpuri as Mrs. Sinha
- Tej Sapru as Rangeela Ratan
- Suresh Chatwal as Mayor

== Music ==
Songs were written by Nawab Arzoo.

1. "Gore Rang Ka Zamana" - Udit Narayan, Asha Bhosle
2. "Tirchi Nazaria Gore Gaal" - Udit Narayan, Kavita Krishnamurthy
3. "Mujhe Yaara Tere Pyar Mein" - Kumar Sanu, Kavita Krishnamurthy
4. "Yeh Bandhan Hai Purana" - Babul Supriyo, Kavita Krishnamurthy
5. "Maine Tujhe Chaaha" - Mohammed Aziz, Kavita Krishnamurthy
6. "Maine Jise Chaha" - Kavita Krishnamurthy
