= Dil Ke Jharoke Main =

- Film poster
- Directed by: Ashim Bhattacharya
- Produced by: Ronnie Screwvala; Zarina Mehta
- Starring: Mamik Singh; Manisha Koirala; Vikas Bhalla; Parveen Dastur; Kulbhushan Kharbanda
- Music by: Bappi Lahiri
- Distributed by: United Motion Pictures; United Television
- Release date: 10 April 1997
- Country: India
- Language: Hindi
- Budget: ₹ 1.25 crore
- Box office: ₹ 66 lakh

Dil Ke Jharoke Main (transl. In The Reflection of My Heart) is a 1997 Indian Hindi-language musical romance film directed by Ashim Bhattacharya.

== Plot ==
Suman and Vijay Rai are two virtually inseparable school-going children. Both are heart-broken when Suman's dad decides to move out to a new location, both have tattooed a heart on their arms and hope to remember each other for the rest of their lives. Years later, they unknowingly meet each other, and this time Suman is married to Vijay's brother, Prakash (Mamik Singh), while Vijay is married to a rich and wealthy U.S. returned woman named Rita. Unfortunately, Prakash and Suman meet with an accident shortly after their marriage, but both recover. But Vijay's marriage with Rita is on the rocks due to incompatibility, with Rita moving out of Vijay's life. It is then Advocate Suresh, Suman's brother, comes across evidence that leads him to conclude that the couple was swapped by unknown person(s).

== Cast ==
- Vikas Bhalla as Vijay Munna Rai
- Manisha Koirala as Suman (Munni)
- Mamik Singh as Prakash Rai
- Satish Kaushik as Mac / Mohan Pahariya
- Kiran Kumar as Heera Pratap
- Kulbhushan Kharbanda as Mahendrapratap Rai
- Aparajita
- Chandrashekhar as Doctor
- Poonam Dasgupta
- Parvin Dastur Rita Pas Rakash / Rita Rai
- Baby Gazala as Munni
- Satyendra Kapoor as Satya Pratap
- Ram Mohan as College Principal
- Anjana Mumtaz as Mrs. Mahendrapratap Rai
- Amita Nangia as Julie (Mac's wife)
- Sudhir Pandey as Surendra Prakash (Rita's dad)
- Shashi Puri as Advocate Suresh
- Sanjivini
- Shivraj as Kashi (Surendra's butler)

== Music ==
Dil Ke Jharoke Main

Soundtrack album by Bappi Lahiri
- Released: 1997
- Genre: Feature film soundtrack
- Label: Venus Records & Tapes
- Producer: Bappi Lahiri

Bappi Lahiri chronology
Amaanat (1994)	Dil Ke Jharoke Main (1997)	Ganga Ki Kasam (1998)

The music is composed by Bappi Lahiri, while the songs are written by Majrooh Sultanpuri.

#	Title	Singer(s)	Length
1	"Aao Re"	Udit Narayan, Vinod Rathod, Alka Yagnik	7:53
2	"Dil Ke Jharoke Main"	Kumar Sanu, Alka Yagnik	6:23
3	"Rassi Utte Tangaya"	Alka Yagnik	6:53
4	"Shahe Dilbara"	Kumar Sanu, Kavita Krishnamurthy	6:00
5	"Jugnuon Se Jagmag"	Udit Narayan	7:31
6	"Shama Ne Jalaaya Ho (Sad Song)"	Kumar Sanu	7:43
