= Jeeo Shaan Se =

- Promotional Poster
- Directed by: Talat Jani
- Produced by: Pranlal Mehta
- Starring: Dharmendra; Reena Roy; Jay Mehta; Sakshi Shivanand; Vikas Bhalla
- Music by: Shyam Surender
- Release date: 14 March 1997
- Country: India
- Language: Hindi

Jeeo Shaan Se is a 1997 Indian Hindi-language film directed by Talat Jani and produced by Pranlal Mehta, starring Dharmendra, Reena Roy, Ayub Khan and Monica Bedi. Dharmendra appears in a triple role.

== Plot ==
The story of Jeeo Shaan Se revolves around two young college students, Kishan (Vikash Bhalla) and Govinda (Jay Mehta), who are led astray by the notion of free sex and are deeply involved in promiscuity. They freely play with innocent girls' virginity and publicly flaunt their intentions. The story takes a different turn when Kishan meets Radha (Shakshi Shivanad), who tries to correct his lustful activities. But his old habit returns in the company of his friend Govinda. Govinda, on the other hand is attracted to Sapna, but she turns out to be different from others of his abused girls and does not give in to his sexual advances. Instead, he falls in love with Anamika (Shiba), only to find later that she is a whore. Enter another character, Gopala (Ayub Khan), who is also a friend of Govinda and Kishan, and loves Kiran (Monica Bedi), but she does not consider him to be her ideal partner. The story then takes a serious note as the three friends try to prove themselves worthy of the girls and win their hearts by changing their ways.

== Cast ==
- Dharmendra as Brahma, Vishnu, Mahesh
- Reena Roy as Lata
- Jay Mehta as Govinda
- Sakshi Shivanand as Radha
- Vikas Bhalla as Kishan
- Ayub Khan as Gopala
- Monica Bedi as Kiran
- Sheeba as Anamika
- Mukesh Rishi as Jagtap
- Rubina Khan as Anuja
- Navneet Nishan as Sapna
- Neena Gupta as Naina

== Music ==
No.	Title	Singer(s)
1	"Thoda Thoda Pyaar"	Vinod Rathod, Alisha Chinai
2	"Gar Pyar Na Kiya To Fir Kya Kiya Sanam"	Kavita Krishnamurthy, Kumar Sanu
3	"Gharwale Ghar Nahi"	Bali Brahmabhat
4	"Jeeo Shaan Se"	Vinod Rathod, Udit Narayan
5	"Mat Khol Tu Pat Ghunghat Ke"	Udit Narayan
6	"Radha Radha Kishan Kishan"	Kumar Sanu
7	"Ye Kya Hua Hai Mujhko"	Udit Narayan
8	"Om Naam Leke Shuru"	Udit Narayan, Vinod Rathod
