= Ek Phool Teen Kante =

Ek Phool Teen Kaante
- Poster
- Directed by: Anup Malik
- Based on: Baby's Day Out by John Hughes
- Produced by: Deven Tanna
- Starring: Tinu Anand; Sadashiv Amrapurkar; Kader Khan; Vikas Bhalla; Monica Bedi
- Music by: Jatin–Lalit
- Production company: Ranjan Films
- Release date: 29 August 1997
- Country: India
- Language: Hindi

Ek Phool Teen Kante (transl. One flower three thorns) is a 1997 Indian Hindi-language comedy film directed by Anup Malik and produced by Deven Tanna. It stars Vikas Bhalla, Sadashiv Amrapurkar, Kader Khan and Monica Bedi in pivotal roles. It was released on 29 August 1997. It is remake of Hollywood movie Baby's Day Out.

== Plot ==
A kidnapper enlists a petty thief to abduct a child in vengeance against the child's grandfather. However, the thief falls in love with the cute child.

== Cast ==
- Vikas Bhalla as ACP Vikas
- Monica Bedi as Monica Sinha (Vikas's Wife)
- Tinu Anand as Yeda
- Sadashiv Amrapurkar as Kaalia
- Kader Khan as Khopadi
- Kiran Kumar as Raju Bhatnagar
- Saeed Jaffrey as Judge SK Sinha (Father of Monica)
- Aasif Sheikh as Daga (Lawyer of Raju Bhatnagar)
- Dinesh Hingoo as Canteen Owner

== Soundtrack ==
| # | Title | Singer(s) | Lyricist(s) |
|---|---|---|---|
| 1 | "Yeh Kaisa Nasha" | Kumar Sanu, Alka Yagnik | Sameer Anjaan |
| 2 | "Chehra Na Dekhungi" | Kavita Krishnamurthy | Sameer Anjaan |
| 3 | "Sun O Sherawali" | Vinod Rathod, Kavita Krishnamurthy | Sameer Anjaan |
| 4 | "Abe Ab Kya Hua" | Babul Supriyo, Sudesh Bhosle | Vinod Mahendra |
| 5 | "Yeh Ladki Badi" | Abhijeet, Alka Yagnik | Nawab Arzoo |
| 6 | "Jaanam Mere Humdum Meri Zindagi" | Kumar Sanu, Alka Yagnik | Sameer Anjaan |
