= Ayub Khan (actor) =

Indian television actor (born February 1969)

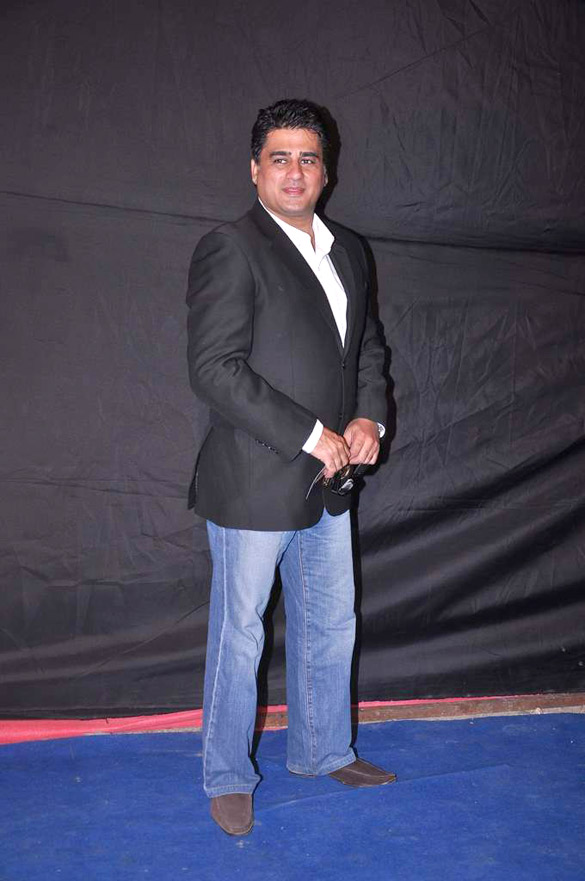
- Ayub Khan in 2012
- Born: 23 February 1969 (age 57); Bombay, Maharashtra, India
- Occupation: Actor
- Years active: 1992–present
- Spouse: Niharika Bhasin (m. 2000; div. 2016)
- Children: Tahura Khan (daughter); Zayra Khan (daughter)
- Parents: Nasir Khan (father); Begum Para (mother)
- Relatives: Dilip Kumar family

Ayub Khan (born 23 February 1969) is an Indian film and television actor. He is the nephew of the actor Dilip Kumar.

== Personal life ==
Khan was born to former 1950s actress Begum Para and actor Nasir Khan, brother to Bollywood superstar Dilip Kumar.

While in college, Khan met Niharika Bhasin, known for films like Rock On!! (2008) and The Dirty Picture (2011). When Niharika left for the US for her studies, they married other people. After 11 years they divorced and married each other. The couple divorced in 2016.

== Filmography ==
=== Film ===
Year	Film	Role	Notes
1992	Mashooq	Karan Kumar	
1993	Meri Aan	Salim	
1994	Salaami	Vijay	
1995	Sanjay	Sanjay Singh	
1996	Smuggler	Inspector Vijay	
1996	Khilona	Ajay	
1997	Mrityudand	Vinay	
1997	Salma Pe Dil Aa Gaya		
1997	Jeeo Shaan Se	Gopala	
1997	Daadagiri	Amar Saxena	
1998	Khote Sikkey	Vijay	
1998	Hafta Vasuli	Ram Chauhan	
1998	Jaane Jigar	Ravi Kumar	
1999	Chehraa	Avinash Saxena	
2000	Mela	Ram Singh	Special appearance
2001	Dil Chahta Hai	Rohit	
2002	Kitne Door... Kitne Paas	Nimesh	
2002	Meghla Akash	Jabed Ahmed	Debut in Bangladeshi film
2003	Qayamat: City Under Threat	Billu	
2003	Gangaajal	Inspector Shaheed Khan	
2003	LOC: Kargil	Major P.S. Janghu	
2004	Woh	Shekhar Amritsari	
2004	Kuch To Gadbad Hai	Sanjay B. Khanna	
2004	Tauba Tauba	Mohan Shanbagh	
2005	Revati		
2005	Apaharan	Kashinath	
2006	Teesri Aankh: The Hidden Camera	Inspector Vikram	
2007	Zamaanat	Sunil	
2010	Toh Baat Pakki!	Surinder Saxena	
2011	Yeh Dooriyan	Abhay	Special appearance
2016	Santa Banta Pvt Ltd	Indian High Commissioner	
2019	Dosti Zindabad		

=== Television ===
Year	Title	Role	Notes	Ref.
1990	Trikon	Inspector Ravi		
1998	Mahabharat Katha	Parikshit		
1999	Muskaan	Rahul		
2000	Tu Naseeb Hai Kisi Aur Ka			
2000	Sambandh	Mrityunjay Saxena		
2000	Piya Binaa			
2001	Alag Alag			
2001	Apharan			
2002	Piya Bina			
2003	Aandhi	Varun		
2003	Karishma - The Miracles of Destiny			
2004	Sahib Biwi Gulam	Chhote Babu		
2005	Kasshish	Anand		
2005–2006	India Calling	Mr. Khanna		
2007	Jeete Hain Jiske Liye	Aman Dhanrajgir		
2008–2009	Rakhi - Ek Atoot Rishte Ki Dor	Balraaj Thakur		
2008–2014	Uttaran	Jogi Thakur		
2012	Sajda Tere Pyaar Mein			
2012–2015	Ek Tha Rusty II and III	Inspector Keemat Lal		
2014	Ek Hasina Thi	Rajnath Goenka		
2015	Phir Bhi Na Maane...Badtameez Dil	Kuber Malhotra		
2015–2016	Zindagi Abhi Baaki Hai Mere Ghost	Keith Adams		
2016	Saab Ji	Samar Bahadur		
2016–2020	Shakti — Astitva Ke Ehsaas Ki	Maninder Singh		
2019	Ek Bhram Sarvagun Sampanna.	Prem Kumar "PK" Mittal		
2021	Ranju Ki Betiyaan	Guddu Mishra		
2022	Spy Bahu	Arun Nanda		
2022	Gud Se Meetha Ishq	Navdeep Shergill		
2023	Tere Ishq Mein Ghayal	Vikram Oberoi		
2023–2024	Neerja – Ek Nayi Pehchaan	Vijay Bagchi		
2026	Juhi Mui	Advocate Uttam Suri		

== Awards ==
Year	Awards	Category	Show	Ref
2010	Zee Gold Awards	Best Supporting Actor Male Critics	Uttaran	
2010	Apsara Awards	Best Actor in a Drama Series	Uttaran	
2010	Indian Telly Awards	Best Supporting Actor Male Popular	Uttaran	
2010	Indian Television Academy Awards	Best Supporting Actor	Uttaran	
2011	Apsara Awards	Best Ensemble Cast	Uttaran	
2011	Zee Gold Awards	Best Supporting Actor Male Popular	Uttaran	
2014	Indian Television Academy Awards	Best Actor In A Negative Role (Male)	Ek Hasina Thi	
