= Saif Ali Khan filmography =

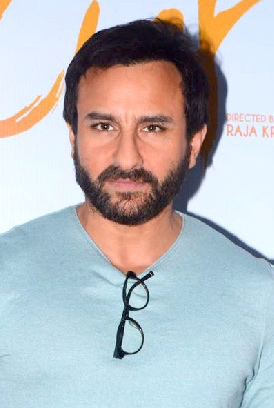
Khan in 2017

Saif Ali Khan is an Indian actor who works in Indian films. He made his debut with a leading role in the drama Parampara (1993) and then starred in Aashik Awara (1993). The latter earned him the Filmfare Award for Best Male Debut, was an commercially successful movie, his next three releases–Parampara was flop and (1993), Pehchaan (1993), and Imtihaan (1994)was Average Grossers . Later in 1994, Khan played supporting roles alongside Akshay Kumar in two of the highest-grossing films of the year–the romance Yeh Dillagi and the action drama Main Khiladi Tu Anari. For his performance in the latter, he was nominated for the Filmfare Award for Best Supporting Actor. This success was followed by a series of commercial failures, leading to a setback in Khan's career.

Khan played the second lead in Milan Luthria's action thriller Kachche Dhaage (1999) and Aarzoo (1999) which was his first commercial success since Main Khiladi Tu Anari; it also earned him another nomination for Best Supporting Actor at Filmfare. Also that year, he starred in the ensemble drama Hum Saath-Saath Hain–the highest-grossing film of the year. In 2000, Khan starred in the drama Kya Kehna, which marked his first of many collaborations with actress Preity Zinta. In 2001, he played alongside Aamir Khan and Akshaye Khanna in Farhan Akhtar's coming of age drama Dil Chahta Hai, which earned him his first Filmfare Award for Best Comedian. It brought a change in his approach and established him as a serious actor. Khan featured in Nikhil Advani's romantic drama Kal Ho Naa Ho (2003), which became the second highest-grossing film of the year and earned him his second Filmfare Award for Best Supporting Actor. In 2004, he played a manipulative pimp in the thriller Ek Hasina Thi and a cartoonist in the romantic comedy Hum Tum. His performance in the latter earned him the National Film Award for Best Actor and a second Filmfare Award for Best Comedian. The following year, Khan reunited with Zinta in the romantic comedy Salaam Namaste (2005) and received his first Best Actor nomination at Filmfare for portraying a passionate musician in the musical romance Parineeta (2005).

In 2006, Khan portrayed a character loosely based on William Shakespeare's antagonist Iago in Vishal Bhardwaj's crime drama Omkara, for which he received widespread praise as well as the Filmfare Award for Best Villain. Later in his career, Khan starred in his four greatest commercial successes–the action thriller Race (2008), the romance Love Aaj Kal (2009), the romantic comedy Cocktail (2012), and the action sequel Race 2 (2013)–all of which were among the top-grossing films of their respective years. In 2018, he began starring as a troubled policeman in the Netflix thriller series Sacred Games. Apart from acting, Khan has hosted several Filmfare Award ceremonies.

== Films ==
Key
| † | Denotes films that have not yet been released |

| Year | Title | Role | Notes | Ref. |
|---|---|---|---|---|
| 1993 | Parampara | Pratab Prithvi Singh | | |
| 1993 | Aashik Awara | Jai (Jimmy alias Rakesh Rajpal) (Note: Khan played a single character who has two different names.) | Won—Filmfare Award for Best Male Debut | |
| 1993 | Pehla Nasha | Himself | Special appearance | |
| 1993 | Pehchaan | Karan Verma | | |
| 1994 | Imtihaan | Vicky | | |
| 1994 | Yeh Dillagi | Vikram "Vicky" Saigal (Note: Khan played a single character with two or more names.) | | |
| 1994 | Main Khiladi Tu Anari | Deepak Kumar | Nominated—Filmfare Award for Best Supporting Actor | |
| 1994 | Yaar Gaddar | Jai Verma | | |
| 1994 | Aao Pyaar Karen | Raja | | |
| 1995 | Surakshaa | Amar / Prince Vijay | | |
| 1996 | Ek Tha Raja | Sunny Dogra | | |
| 1996 | Bambai Ka Babu | Vikram "Vicky" | | |
| 1996 | Tu Chor Main Sipahi | Raja | | |
| 1996 | Dil Tera Diwana | Ravi Kumar | | |
| 1997 | Hameshaa | Raja and Raju (Note: Khan performed dual roles in the film.) | | |
| 1997 | Udaan | Raja | | |
| 1998 | Keemat – They Are Back | Ajay | | |
| 1998 | Humse Badhkar Kaun | Sunny | | |
| 1999 | Yeh Hai Mumbai Meri Jaan | Raju Tarachand | | |
| 1999 | Kachche Dhaage | Dhananjay "Jai" Pandit | Nominated—Filmfare Award for Best Supporting Actor | |
| 1999 | Aarzoo | Amar | | |
| 1999 | Biwi No.1 | Deepak Sharma | | |
| 1999 | Hum Saath-Saath Hain | Vinod Chaturvedi | | |
| 2000 | Kya Kehna | Rahul Modi | | |
| 2001 | Love Ke Liye Kuch Bhi Karega | Prakash Singh | | |
| 2001 | Dil Chahta Hai | Sameer Mulchandni | Won—Filmfare Award for Best Performance in a Comic Role | |
| 2001 | Rehna Hai Tere Dil Mein | Rajiv "Sam" Saamra | | |
| 2002 | Na Tum Jaano Na Hum | Akshay Kapoor | | |
| 2003 | Darna Mana Hai | Anil Manchandani | Story segment: No Smoking | |
| 2003 | Kal Ho Naa Ho | Rohit Patel | Won—Filmfare Award for Best Supporting Actor | |
| 2003 | LOC Kargil | Captain Anuj Nayyar | | |
| 2004 | Ek Hasina Thi | Karan Singh Rathod | | |
| 2004 | Hum Tum | Karan Kapoor | Won—National Film Award for Best Actor; Won—Filmfare Award for Best Performance in a Comic Role | |
| 2005 | Parineeta | Shekhar Rai | Nominated—Filmfare Award for Best Actor | |
| 2005 | Salaam Namaste | Nikhil "Nick" Arora | | |
| 2006 | Being Cyrus | Cyrus Mistry | English film | |
| 2006 | Omkara | Ishwar "Langda" Tyagi | Won—Filmfare Award for Best Performance in a Negative Role | |
| 2007 | Eklavya: The Royal Guard | Harshvardhan Rana | | |
| 2007 | Nehlle Pe Dehlla | Jimmy | | |
| 2007 | Ta Ra Rum Pum | Rajveer Singh | | |
| 2007 | Om Shanti Om | Himself | Special appearance in the song "Deewangi Deewangi" | |
| 2008 | Race | Ranvir "Ronnie" Singh | | |
| 2008 | Tashan | Jimmy Cliff / Jeetendra Kumar Makhwana | | |
| 2008 | Thoda Pyaar Thoda Magic | Ranbir Talwar | | |
| 2008 | Roadside Romeo | Romeo (voice) | Animated feature film | |
| 2009 | Sanam Teri Kasam | Vijay Verma | | |
| 2009 | Love Aaj Kal | Jai Vardhan Singh/Young Veer Singh | Also producer | |
| 2009 | Love Aaj Kal | Jai Vardhan Singh/Young Veer Singh | Nominated—Filmfare Award for Best Actor; Nominated—Filmfare Award for Best Film | |
| 2009 | Kurbaan | Ehsaan Khan (Khalid) | | |
| 2011 | Aarakshan | Deepak Kumar | | |
| 2012 | Agent Vinod | Agent Vinod | Also producer | |
| 2012 | Cocktail | Gautam "Gutlu" Kapoor | Also producer | |
| 2013 | Race 2 | Ranvir "Ronnie" Singh | | |
| 2013 | Bombay Talkies | Himself | Special appearance in the song "Apna Bombay Talkies" | |
| 2013 | Go Goa Gone | Boris | Extended cameo Also producer | |
| 2013 | Bullett Raja | Raja Mishra | | |
| 2014 | Humshakals | Ashok Singhania / Ashok 2 / Chinku / Dr. Khan's assistant 1 (Note: Khan played triple roles in the film.) | | |
| 2014 | Lekar Hum Deewana Dil | – | Producer | |
| 2014 | Happy Ending | Yudi Jaitely & Yogi | Also producer | |
| 2015 | Dolly Ki Doli | Prince Kunwar Aditya Singh | Cameo appearance | |
| 2015 | Phantom | Daniyal Khan | | |
| 2017 | Rangoon | Rustom "Rusi" Billimoria | | |
| 2017 | Chef | Roshan Kalra | | |
| 2018 | Kaalakaandi | Rileen | | |
| 2018 | Baazaar | Shakun Kothari | | |
| 2019 | Laal Kaptaan | Gossain | | |
| 2020 | Tanhaji | Udaybhan Singh Rathod | Won—Filmfare Award for Best Supporting Actor | |
| 2020 | Jawaani Jaaneman | Jaswinder "Jazz" Singh | Also producer | |
| 2020 | Dil Bechara | Abhimanyu Veer | Cameo appearance | |
| 2021 | Bhoot Police | Vibhooti "Vibhu" Vaidya | | |
| 2021 | Bunty Aur Babli 2 | Rakesh "Bunty Sr." Trivedi/Bobby Bhullar | | |
| 2022 | Vikram Vedha | Vikram | | |
| 2023 | Adipurush | Lankesh | Bilingual film | |
| 2024 | Devara: Part 1 | Bhairava "Bhaira" | Telugu film | |
| 2025 | Jewel Thief | Rehan Roy | | |
| 2026 | Kartavya | Pawan Malik | Netflix film | |
| 2026 | Haiwaan | Shyam Rane | | |
| TBA | Hum Hindustani † | TBA | Completed | |
| TBA | Ritesh Batra's next † | TBA | Filming | |

== Television ==
| Year | Title | Role | Notes | Ref. |
|---|---|---|---|---|
| 2003 | 48th Filmfare Awards | Host/presenter | Television special | |
| 2004 | 49th Filmfare Awards | Host/presenter | Television special | |
| 2005 | 50th Filmfare Awards | Host/presenter | Television special | |
| 2008 | 53rd Filmfare Awards | Host/presenter | Television special | |
| 2010 | 55th Filmfare Awards | Host/presenter | Television special | |
| 2013 | 58th Filmfare Awards | Host/presenter | Television special | |
| 2018–2019 | Sacred Games | Sartaj Singh | | |
| 2021 | Tandav | Samar Pratap Singh | | |
| 2023 | The Romantics | Himself | Documentary | |
| 2025 | Dining with the Kapoors | | | |

== Discography ==
| Year | Film | Song | Composer | Ref. |
|---|---|---|---|---|
| 1999 | Hum Saath-Saath Hain | "A B C D" | Raamlaxman | |
| 2004 | Hum Tum | "Ladki Kyon" | Jatin-Lalit | |
| 2008 | Tashan | "Jimmy Ka Tashan" | Vishal–Shekhar | |
| 2008 | Roadside Romeo | "Cool Cool" | Salim–Sulaiman | |
| 2009 | Love Aaj Kal | "Twist" | Pritam | |
