= List of awards and nominations received by Saif Ali Khan =

Saif Ali Khan awards and nominations
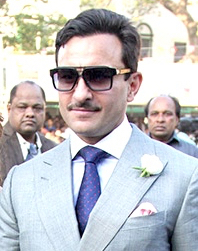
- Khan in 2016
Awards and nominations
Award	Wins	Nominations
National Film Awards	1	0
Filmfare Awards	7	5
IIFA Awards	3	5
Zee Cine Awards	3	3
Star Screen Awards	4	3
Stardust Awards	1	1
Other awards	15	3
Honours	7	0

Totals (Note: Certain award groups do not simply award one winner. They acknowledge several different recipients, have runners-up, and have third place. Since this is a specific recognition and is different from losing an award, runner-up mentions are considered wins in this award tally. For simplification and to avoid errors, each award in this list has been presumed to have had a prior nomination.)
- Wins: 41
- Nominations: 20

Saif Ali Khan (pronounced [sɛːf əˈli xaːn]; born on 16 August 1970) is an Indian actor and film producer. Khan is the recipient of several accolades, including a National Film Award and 7 Filmfare Awards, and received the Padma Shri, the fourth highest Indian civilian award, in 2010.

Among Khan's accolades include a National Film Award for Best Actor and 7 Filmfare Awards out of 12 nominations: Best Male Debut for Aashiq Awara (1993), Best Performance in a Comic Role for Dil Chahta Hai (2001) and Hum Tum (2004), Best Supporting Actor for Kal Ho Naa Ho (2003) and Tanhaji: The Unsung Warrior (2020), Best Performance in a Negative Role for Omkara (2006) and "Moto Look of the Year" for Kal Ho Naa Ho (2003).

== National Film Awards ==
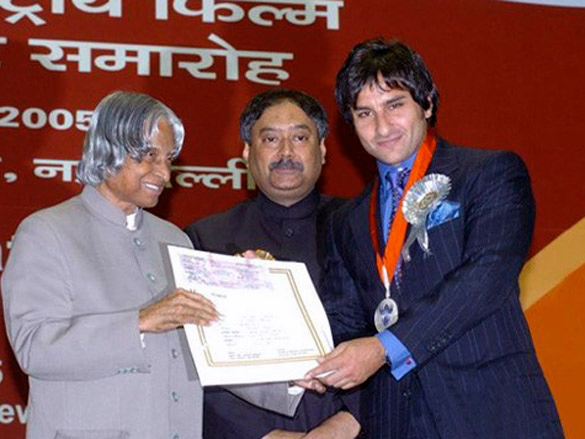
Khan at 52nd National Film Awards

Year	Award	For	Result	Ref.
2005	Best Actor	Hum Tum	Won	

== Filmfare Awards ==
Year	Category	For	Result	Ref.
1994	Best Male Debut	Aashik Awara	Won	
1995	Best Supporting Actor	Main Khiladi Tu Anari	Nominated	
2000	Best Supporting Actor	Kachche Dhaage	Nominated	
2002	Best Comedian	Dil Chahta Hai	Won	
2004	Best Supporting Actor	Kal Ho Naa Ho	Won	
2004	Motorola "Moto Look of the Year"	Kal Ho Naa Ho	Won	
2005	Best Actor	Hum Tum	Nominated	
2005	Best Comedian	Hum Tum	Won	
2006	Best Actor	Parineeta	Nominated	
2006	Best Actor	Salaam Namaste	Nominated	
2007	Best Villain	Omkara	Won	
2010	Best Actor	Love Aaj Kal	Nominated	
2010	Best Film	Love Aaj Kal	Nominated	
2021	Best Supporting Actor	Tanhaji: The Unsung Warrior	Won	
2025	Man of Style and Substance award		Won	

== IIFA Awards ==
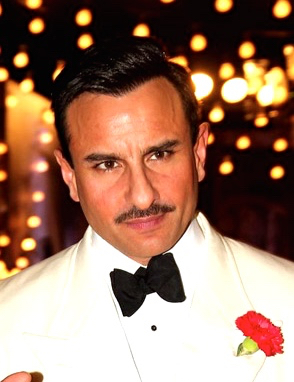
Khan in 2015

Year	Category	For	Result	Ref.
2002	Best Supporting Actor	Dil Chahta Hai	Won	
2004	Best Supporting Actor	Kal Ho Naa Ho	Won	
2007	Best Villain	Omkara	Won	
2005	Best Villain	Ek Hasina Thi	Nominated	
2005	Best Actor	Hum Tum	Nominated	
2006	Best Actor	Parineeta	Nominated	
2006	Best Actor	Salaam Namaste	Nominated	
2010	Best Actor	Love Aaj Kal	Nominated	
2022	Best Supporting Actor	Tanhaji	Nominated	

== Zee Cine Awards ==
Year	Category	For	Result	Ref.
2002	Best Supporting Actor	Dil Chahta Hai	Won	
2004	Best Supporting Actor	Kal Ho Naa Ho	Won	
2007	Best Villain	Omkara	Won	
2005	Best Villain	Ek Hasina Thi	Nominated	
2005	Best Comedian	Hum Tum	Nominated	
2006	Best Actor	Parineeta	Nominated	

== Star Screen Awards ==
Year	Category	For	Result	Ref.
2002	Best Supporting Actor	Dil Chahta Hai	Won	
2004	Best Supporting Actor	Kal Ho Naa Ho	Won	
2007	Best Villain	Omkara	Won	
2012	Best Supporting Actor	Aarakshan	Won	
2005	Best Actor	Hum Tum	Nominated	
2005	Best Villain	Ek Hasina Thi	Nominated	
2006	Jodi No. 1 (along with Preity Zinta)	Salaam Namaste	Nominated	

== Stardust Awards ==
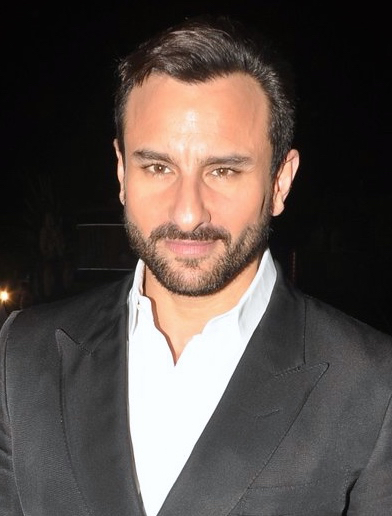
Khan at Stardust Awards in 2014

Year	Award	For	Result	Ref.
2007	Star of the Year - Male	Omkara	Nominated	
2007	Best Actor in a Negative Role	Omkara	Won	

== Other awards and recognitions ==
Year	Award	For	Result	Ref.
2006	Global Indian Film Awards for Best Villain	Omkara	Won	
2007	Bollywood Movie Award for Best Villain	Omkara	Won	
2007	Kara Film Festival for Best Actor	Omkara	Won	
2008	GQ Men of The Year Awards (India)	Ultimate GQ Man Award	Won	
2010	Padma Shri	Achievement In Hindi Cinema	Won	
2016	GQ Men of The Year Awards (India)	Most Stylish Actor	Won	
2018	GQ Men of The Year Awards (India)	Style Legend Award	Won	

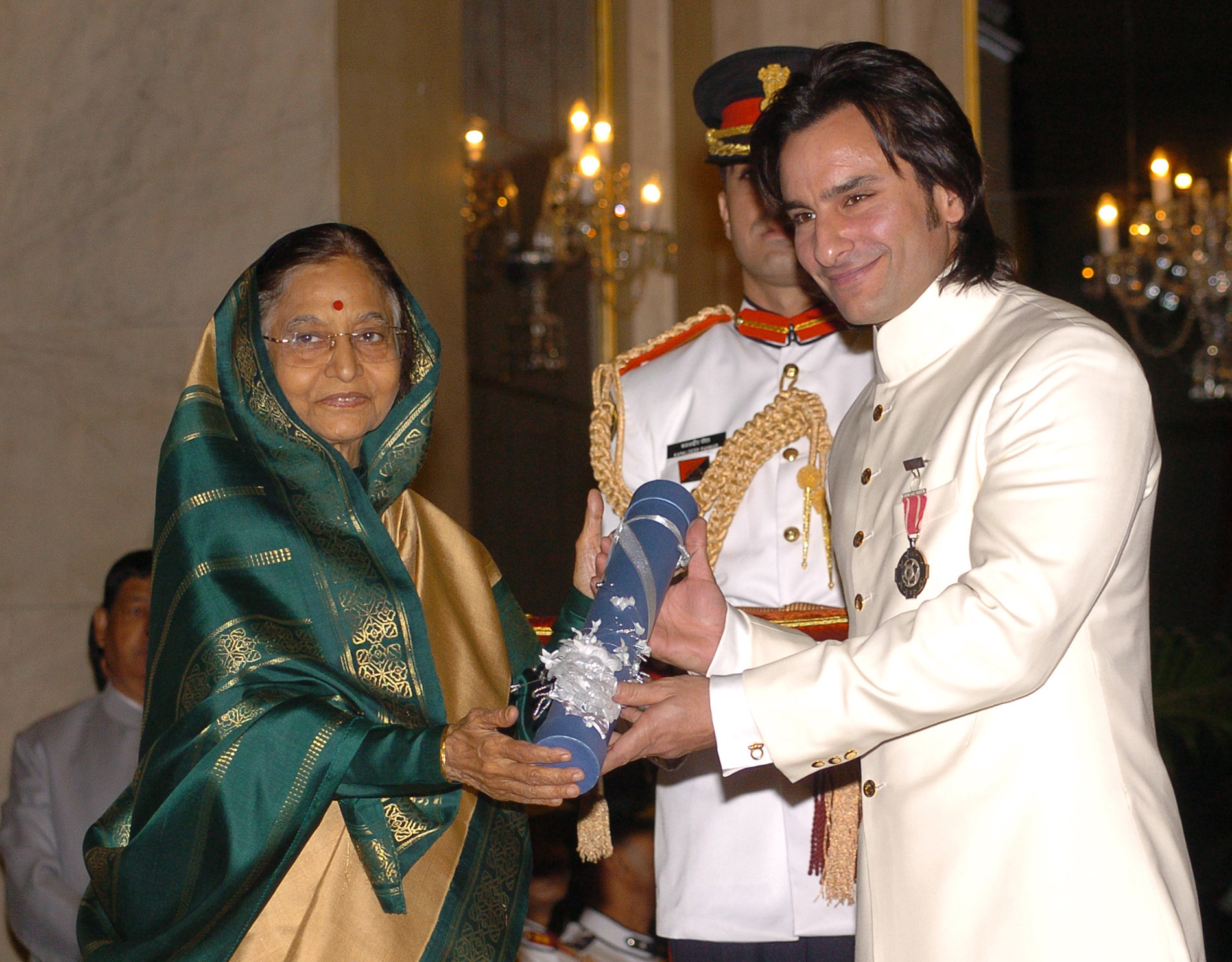
Khan received Padma Shri award from former Indian president Pratibha Devisingh Patil in 2010

== See also ==
- List of accolades received by Kal Ho Naa Ho
