= Jugal Hansraj =

Indian actor

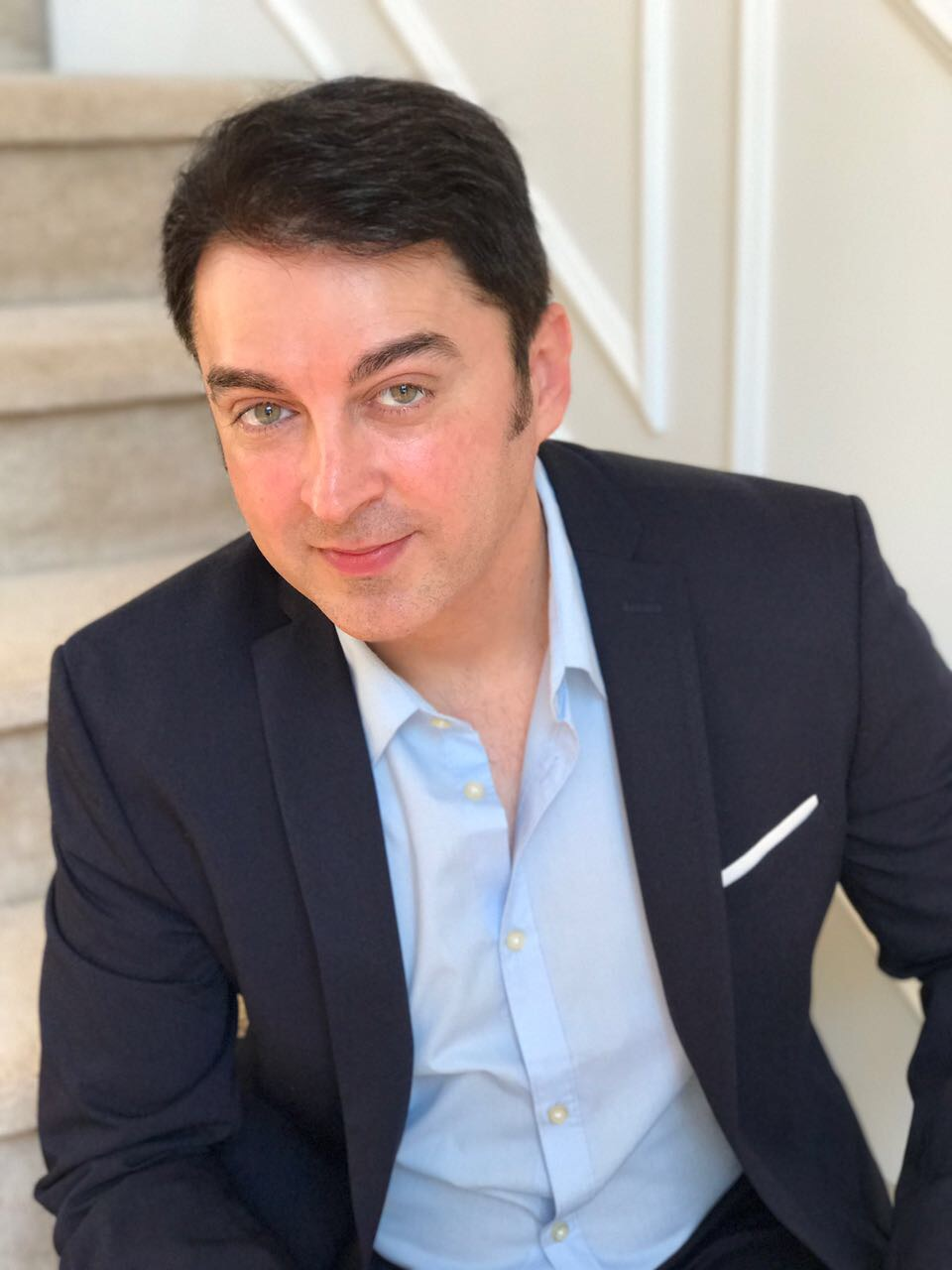
- Hansraj in 2017
- Born: 26 July 1972 (age 53); Bombay, Maharashtra, India
- Occupations: Actor; author; filmmaker
- Years active: 1983–present
- Spouse: Jasmine Dhillon (m. 2014)
- Children: 1
- Father: Pravin Hansraj
- Relatives: Chetan Hansraj (cousin)

Jugal Hansraj (born 26 July 1972) is an Indian actor, author and filmmaker. He started his career as a child actor in Shekhar Kapur's Masoom (1983). He continued his career as a child actor in films like Karma (1986) and Sultanat (1986). He featured as a model for TV and print as a child and appeared in notable ad campaigns. He made his acting debut as an adult in Aa Gale Lag Jaa in 1994. Subsequently, he featured in Mohabbatein (2000), Kabhi Khushi Kabhie Gham (2001) and Salaam Namaste (2005). He served as writer and director for the 2008 animated film Roadside Romeo.

== Early life ==
Jugal Hansraj is the younger son of former cricketer Pravin Hansraj. He has an older brother named Sunil Hansraj.

== Career ==
Jugal Hansraj started his career as a child artist in the 1983 film Masoom, which stars Naseeruddin Shah and Shabana Azmi. The film is about a 9-year-old boy whose stepmother is not willing to accept him into the family because he is born from her husband's infidelity. Masoom is based on Man, Woman and Child, a novel by Erich Segal. The film received a positive response and launched Hansraj's career. He continued his career as a child actor in films like Karma (1986) and Sultanat (1986). Hansraj was also featured as a model for TV and print as a child. He appeared in notable ad campaigns such as Vicks Vaporub, Saffola and Nutramul.

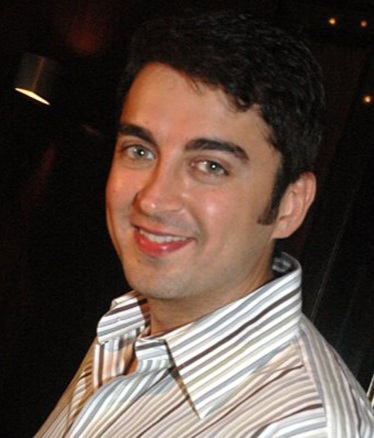
Jugal Hansraj in 2006.

He started his adult career with Aa Gale Lag Jaa in 1994, where he was paired with Urmila Matondkar, who incidentally played his sister in his first film Masoom. His second film was Papa Kehte Hai in 1995 opposite Mayuri Kango. The 2000 film Mohabbatein, which also featured Shahrukh Khan and Amitabh Bachchan, was his adult breakthrough film. He then played guest roles in Kabhi Khushi Kabhie Gham (2001), Salaam Namaste (2005), Aaja Nachle (2007) and Kahaani 2 (2016).

In 1998, Jugal composed the tune of the title song for his friend Karan Johar’s first film “Kuch Kuch Hota Hai.” Karan confirmed this in his autobiography “An Unsuitable Boy.” The tune went on to become Dharma Productions theme title music.

He served as writer and director for the 2008 animated film Roadside Romeo. Produced jointly by Yash Raj Films and Walt Disney Studios, it featured the voices of Saif Ali Khan, Kareena Kapoor and Javed Jaffrey. It received negative reviews from critics, but won the National Film Award for Best Animated Film. A song sequence from the film was also nominated for the Visual Effects Society Awards for Outstanding Animation in an Animated Feature Motion Picture.

His second film as a director was the romantic comedy Pyaar Impossible which released in January 2010. This was produced by Yash Raj Films and starred Priyanka Chopra and Uday Chopra.

In 2017, Jugal became a published author with his first novel for children titled "Cross Connection: The Big Circus Adventure". The book was released in December 2017 by Rupa publications India.

== Personal life ==
In July 2014, Hansraj married Jasmine Dhillon, an NRI investment banker from New York. The couple has a son named Sidak.

Actor Chetan Hansraj is his cousin.

== Filmography ==
=== Films ===
Year	Title	Role(s)	Notes
1983	Masoom	Rahul	Child artist
1984	Jhutha Sach	Bishan (Binny)	Child artist
1986	Sultanat	Unnamed role	Child artist
1986	Karma	Dada Thakur's youngest son	Child artist
1987	Loha	Hassan Ali	Child artist
1987	Hukumat	Chintu	Child artist
1994	Aa Gale Lag Jaa	Suraj	
1995	The Don	Vijay	
1996	Papa Kehte Hai	Rohit Dixit	
1997	Gudgudee	Singer	Special appearance
2000	Mohabbatein	Sameer Sharma	
2001	Kabhi Khushi Kabhie Gham	Rohan's friend	Special appearance
2002	Hum Pyar Tumhi Se Kar Baithe	Vishwas	
2005	Soggadu	Chandu	Telugu film
2005	Salaam Namaste	Jignesh “Jerry” Patel	
2007	Aaja Nachle	Sanjay Mehra	
2008	Roadside Romeo	—	Writer and director; Animated film
2010	Pyaar Impossible!	Special Appearance as the showroom manager	Director
2016	Kahaani 2: Durga Rani Singh	Mohit Dewan	
2023	Shiv Shastri Balboa	Rahul	
2023	Lust Stories 2	David Chaudhary	
2024	Bade Miyan Chote Miyan	Mohsin Khan	
2025	Nadaaniyan	Sanjay Mehta	

=== Television ===
Year	Title	Role(s)	Notes
2003–2004	Karishma – The Miracles of Destiny	Kunal	
2010	Rishta.com	Akshay Dwiwedi	
2013	Yeh Hai Aashiqui	Badminton Coach	
2022	Mismatched	Rishi's father	
2025	The Family Man	Dwaraknath	
