= Pravin Hansraj =

Indian cricketer (1938–2014)

Personal information
- Born: 24 July 1938; Karachi, Sindh, British India
- Died: 28 January 2014 (aged 75); Mumbai, Maharashtra, India
- Source: Cricinfo, 16 May 2016

Pravin Hansraj (24 July 1938 – 28 January 2014) was an Indian cricketer. He played nine first-class matches for Saurashtra between 1963 and 1966.

His son Jugal Hansraj is a Bollywood actor and director.
