= Military Raaj =

- Promotional poster
- Directed by: Sanjay Sharma
- Written by: Shyam Goyel; Bimla Sharma(story idea)
- Produced by: Anil Trehan
- Starring: Mithun Chakraborty; Aditya Pancholi; Pratibha Sinha; Prem Chopra; Irfan Kamal; Deepak Shirke
- Cinematography: Ashok Rajan
- Music by: Bappi Lahiri
- Production company: Hitan Films
- Release date: 27 February 1998
- Running time: 140 minutes
- Country: India
- Language: Hindi

Military Raaj is a 1998 Indian Hindi-language action film directed by Sanjay Sharma, starring Mithun Chakraborty, Aditya Pancholi, Pratibha Sinha, Prem Chopra, Irfan Kamal and Deepak Shirke.

== Plot ==
Major Anand is a patriotic army officer who strives to prevent crime. The police often blame him, stating that the army has no power to fight crime in civil society and that it is the police's duty. Politicians backing up criminals transfer him to a training camp full of undisciplined cadets, making him head of the camp. There, he trains the cadets to become honest soldiers. When the police are unable to maintain law and order and crime overwhelms them, the government has no option but to confine the police to their barracks and call in the army to take over security in the country, i.e. to form a military state.

== Cast ==
- Mithun Chakraborty as Major Anand
- Aditya Pancholi as Gentleman Cadet Ashfaque
- Pratibha Sinha as Priya, Chadalal's daughter
- Raymon Singh as Mathu
- Prem Chopra as Minister Yashvant Rai
- Irfan Kamal
- Gautam Singh
- Mushtaq Khan as Chadalal, servant Rai's, Priya's father
- Pramod Moutho as Politician Nageshwar Rao
- Siddharth Dhawan
- Deepak Shirke as Swamiji (evil priest)
- Vishwajeet Pradhan as Prakash Rai
- Mahavir Shah as Police Inspector Arvind Desai
- Mac Mohan as Police Inspector Jagmohan
- Achyut Potdar as Kale
- Janardhan Parab as Political party leader
- Reshma Singh as Anuja
- Pinky Chinoy as Sushma

== Soundtrack ==
1. "Kabhi Hafte Me Do Hafte Me" - Poornima, Bappi Lahiri
2. "Rim Jhim Rim Jhim (Military Raaj)" - Kumar Sanu, Poornima
3. " Aage Se Dekha" - Abhijeet
4. "Balle Balle (Part 1)" - Bappi Lahiri
5. "Balle Balle (Part 2)" - Bappi Lahiri
6. "Chinchink Chinak Tu" - N/A
7. "Gulaabi Hai Gulaabi" - Vinod Rathore, Sadhana Sargam
