= Yeh Hai Mumbai Meri Jaan =

- Directed by: Mahesh Bhatt
- Written by: John Bach; Girish Dhamija
- Produced by: Mukesh Bhatt
- Starring: Saif Ali Khan; Twinkle Khanna; Chunky Pandey
- Cinematography: Bhushan Patel
- Edited by: Ketan Grover
- Music by: Jatin–Lalit
- Production company: Vishesh Films
- Release date: 10 December 1999
- Country: India
- Language: Hindi

Yeh Hai Mumbai Meri Jaan (transl. This is Mumbai, My Sweetheart); formerly known as Mr. Aashiq (transl. Mr. Beau) is a 1999 Indian Hindi-language romantic comedy film directed by Mahesh Bhatt and produced by Mukesh Bhatt, starring Saif Ali Khan, Twinkle Khanna, Akshay Anand and Chunky Pandey. The film was flop at the box office. The film is a remake of Michael J. Fox's 1987 film The Secret of My Success.

== Plot ==
Raju Tarachand (Saif Ali Khan) a small-town guy who has come to Mumbai to try his luck in the corporate world. On his arrival he gets duped of his car and luggage by Chali (Chunky Pandey). He goes to Mr. Malhotra's office and convinces him to grant him a job. When he finds out that he has been hired as a lowly peon, he quits thinking this is beneath him. He changes his mind when he sees that the beautiful Jasmine (Twinkle Khanna) also works there, in hope of catching her eye.

Mr. Malhotra is having problems in his company that, unknown to anyone, are caused by his brother Papaji (Avtar Gill). He has placed a spy, M.R. Poplet (Girish Dhamija), to sabotage the company so that he (Papaji) can take it over. Malhotra hires a corporate P.I., David Rathod, to help him, but Rathod gets held up. Raju grabs this opportunity to get close to Jasmine and apply his training to set the company right while trying to maintain his job as the peon.

How this convoluted situation gets resolved is the story of the movie.

== Cast ==
- Saif Ali Khan as Raju Tarachand / Husna Bano / David Rathod
- Twinkle Khanna as Jasmine Arora
- Chunky Pandey as Chali D'Souza
- Saurabh Shukla as Mr. Malhotra "Chhotey"
- Akshay Anand as David Rathod / Jo Jo Vaswani
- Avtar Gill as Malhotra's brother "Papaji"
- Girish Dhamija as M.R. Poplet
- Sanjeeva Vatsa as Sanjiva Vatsa
- Savita Karle
- Ramesh Rai
- Gautam Saugat
- Krishna Bhatt
- Abbas Ali Moghul (as Abbas Ali)
- Tanuja Chandra as Chachi Chunchi
- Sanjay Jha
- Khalid Siddiqui as Khalid
- Dolly Powari
- Deepak Tijori as Dancer at Parsi party
- Shruti Ulfat as Dancer at Parsi party

== Soundtrack ==
Mr. Aashiq

Film score by Jatin-Lalit
- Released: 16 October 1998
- Recorded: 1996
- Genre: Feature film soundtrack
- Length: 22:58
- Label: His Master's Voice

"Mera Chand Mujhe Aaya Hai Nazar" became a signature hit from the album, owing to its melodic hook and Kumar Sanu’s vocals, which made it widely popular.

#	Title	Singer(s)	Length
1	"Mera Chand Mujhe Aaya Hai Nazar"	Kumar Sanu	05:50
2	"Teri Chahat Ke Deewane"	Kumar Sanu, Alka Yagnik	05:33
3	"Yeh Ghadi Sanam"	Kumar Sanu, Alka Yagnik	06:16
4	"Humko Aawaz De"	Kumar Sanu, Alka Yagnik	05:58
5	"Wada Kiya Humne"	Kumar Sanu, Alka Yagnik	05:32
6	"Tu Bada Gazab Ka Yaar Hai" ( not in the film)	Sonu Nigam, Abhijeet, Kavita Krishnamurthy	04:54
7	"Yeh Hai Mumbai Meri Jaan"	Sudesh Bhosle	05:59

== Production ==
The film was announced, shot and completed in 1995 under the title Mr. Aashiq and the audio released under that name in 1996. When the film got delayed, its producers changed its title and released it as Yeh Hai Mumbai Meri Jaan.

This was the second film where Saif played a role inspired by Michael J. Fox's role in the original film. Earlier he had played the role of a movie star inspired by Fox's character from The Hard Way, in the film Main Khiladi Tu Anari.
