= Aa Gale Lag Jaa (1994 film) =

- Poster
- Directed by: Hamid Ali Khan
- Written by: Salim Akhtar; Santosh Saroj (Dialogue)
- Produced by: Salim Akhtar
- Starring: Jugal Hansraj; Urmila Matondkar; Paresh Rawal; Ashok Saraf; Ajit; Arjun
- Cinematography: Anwar Siraj
- Edited by: Waman Bhonsle; Gurudutt Shirali
- Music by: Anu Malik
- Production company: Aftab Pictures
- Release date: 13 May 1994
- Running time: 158 min
- Country: India
- Language: Hindi

Aa Gale Lag Jaa (transl. Come, embrace me) is a 1994 Indian Hindi language romantic thriller film directed by Hamid Ali Khan and starring Jugal Hansraj, Urmila Matondkar, Paresh Rawal, Ashok Saraf, Ajit, Reema Lagoo, Raza Murad, Arjun and Gulshan Grover.

The film marked the first leading role for Jugal Hansraj, who previously was a child artist in several films in the 1980s. Coincidentally, he was paired with Urmila Matondkar who had played his sister in his debut film Masoom (1983).

== Plot ==
Suraj (Jugal Hansraj) is a poor boy raised by his father Mangatram (Paresh Rawal), while Roshni (Urmila Matondkar) is a wealthy girl raised by her widowed mother Shakuntala (Reema Lagoo). Suraj and Roshni fall in love, but Shakuntala opposes their marriage after learning that Suraj is the son of the driver who allegedly murdered Roshni's father. Mangatram confirms that Suraj's father was imprisoned and killed by a speeding truck shortly after his release.

Heartbroken, Suraj abandons his hopes of marrying Roshni. Meanwhile, Roshni's father's former business partners are murdered one by one, and suspicion falls on Suraj. The cases are assigned to the eccentric Police Inspector Rambhajan Singh (Gulshan Grover), who eventually realises that an unknown third party is responsible. He sets a trap to catch the killer.

The killer is revealed to be Suraj's supposedly dead father. He explains that Roshni's father's business partners were the real perpetrators of his murder, having feared that he would expose their fraudulent activities. They framed Suraj's father, who had attempted to remove the knife from his employer's body. Before Inspector Singh can arrest him, Suraj's father finds the final surviving partner in hospital and kills him. He then surrenders to the police, bringing the film to an end.

== Cast ==
- Jugal Hansraj as Suraj
- Urmila Matondkar as Roshni
- Paresh Rawal as Mangatram
- Ashok Saraf as Dhaniram
- Reema Lagoo as Shakuntala
- Arun Bali as Seth Mohanlal
- Ajit as Kalka Singh
- Ranjeet as Dr. Avinash Mathur
- Raza Murad as Advocate Jagatpal Sharma
- Roopesh Kumar as Satish Khanna
- Arjun as Sikandar Khanna
- Gulshan Grover as Inspector Rambhajan Singh
- Dinesh Hingoo as Constable Bankelal
- Ishrat Ali as Rakabh Singh
- Kunickaa Sadanand as Mrs. Jagatpal Sharma

== Soundtrack ==
The film is remembered for its melodious songs by Anu Malik. Anand-Milind were the original composers and even composed some of the songs (now available online) but their compositions were not included in the soundtrack.

#	Title	Singer(s)	Lyricist(s)
1	"Aa Gale Lag Jaa"	Abhijeet, Kavita Krishnamurthy	Nawab Arzoo
2	"Aaj Humein Malum Hua"	Kumar Sanu, Kavita Krishnamurthy	Anwar Sagar
3	"Hum Na Honge Juda"	Udit Narayan, Sadhana Sargam	Anwar Sagar
4	"Jis Jeevan Mein"	Udit Narayan, Sujatha Goswami	Zameer Kazmi
5	"Tere Baghair"	Kumar Sanu, Sadhana Sargam	Gauhar Kanpuri
6	"Yaad Teri Aati Hai"	Kumar Sanu	Anwar Sagar
7	"Main Aashiq Hoon"	Kumar Sanu, Sujatha Goswami	Rani Malik
