= Pratibha Sinha =

Indian actress

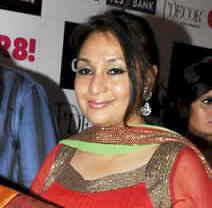
- Sinha in March 2013
- Born: 4 July 1969 (age 56); Kolkata, West Bengal, India
- Occupation: Actress
- Years active: 1992–2000
- Mother: Mala Sinha

Pratibha Sinha is a former Indian actress working in Hindi-language films and the daughter of Mala Sinha. She made her film debut opposite Sujoy Mukherjee in the 1992 film Mehboob Mere Mehboob. She quit acting in 2000.

== Filmography ==
Film performances
Year	Title	Role	Notes
1992	Mehboob Mere Mehboob	Heer Choudhry	
1992	Kal Ki Awaz	Shagufa 'Shagufi' Haider Jaffri	
1993	Dil Hai Betaab	Meena	
1995	Pokiri Raja	Pratibha	Telugu-language film
1996	Ek Tha Raja	Kitty	
1996	Tu Chor Main Sipahi	Rani	
1996	Raja Hindustani	Dancer	Guest appearance
1997	Gudgudee	Chandni	
1997	Deewana Mastana	Tina	Guest appearance
1997	Koi Kisise Kum Nahin	Poonam	
1998	Zanjeer	Saroj	
1998	Military Raaj	Priya	
1998	Ajnabi Saaya		
2000	Le Chal Apne Sang	Priya	
