= Ajnabi Saaya =

1998 Indian film by Prasun Banerjee

- Music by: Dilip Dutta
- Release date: 1998
- Country: India
- Language: Hindi

Ajnabi Saaya is a 1998 Hindi-language Horror film directed and produced by Prasun Banerjee, starring Mithun Chakraborty, Aditya Pancholi and Pratibha Sinha.

== Plot ==
Sheila, a young woman dies in a road accident but her husband Rajesh recovers from it after a year. He is going to marry again with Sunita but his first wife appears very often. Rajesh is in trauma whether Sheila is really alive or not.

== Cast ==
- Mithun Chakraborty
- Aditya Pancholi
- Pratibha Sinha
- Shiva Rindani
- Deepak Shirke
- Shakti Kapoor
- Kiran Kumar
- Kishore Bhanushali

== Soundtrack ==
1. "Aa Ke Manzil Pe" – Kumar Sanu
2. "Aaiye Aaiye" – Sapna Mukherjee
3. "Aaiye Aaiye v2" – Sapna Mukherjee
4. "Jaane Yeh Kya Ho Gaya" – Hemlata
5. "Kathak Karega Bhangra" – Kavita Krishnamurthy
6. "Mujhe Peene Ki Aadat Nahin" – Kumar Sanu
