= Dil Hai Betaab =

1993 Indian film by K. C. Bokadia

- Directed by: K. C. Bokadia
- Produced by: Avinash Chander
- Starring: Ajay Devgn; Pratibha Sinha; Vivek Mushran
- Music by: Laxmikant–Pyarelal
- Distributed by: Avinash Productions
- Release date: 27 August 1993
- Country: India
- Language: Hindi

Dil Hai Betaab (transl. The Heart is Desperate) is a 1993 Indian romance film directed by K. C. Bokadia. The film stars Ajay devgn, Pratibha Sinha and Vivek Mushran.

== Plot ==
Meena (Pratibha Sinha) is an attractive young woman who lives with her middle-class parents in a city in India. Her father, Parshuram (Kader Khan), works as a chaprasi (peon) for an organisation run by the wealthy Vikram Singh (Mohnish Bahl). Meena meets Raja (Vivek Mushran), a fellow college student, and the two fall in love. However, they encounter problems when they discover that another young man, Ajay (Ajay Devgn), is also in love with Meena and refuses to let anyone stand in his way. When Meena appeals to Ajay, he relents and gives his blessing to the young couple. Just as they begin to believe the path is clear for them to marry, Meena's parents receive a marriage proposal from Vikram Singh. The greedy Parshuram is delighted and hopes to earn a promotion by becoming the father-in-law of his employer. The question remains: will Meena also react like her father and agree to marry Vikram?

== Cast ==
- Ajay Devgn as Ajay
- Pratibha Sinha as Meena
- Vivek Mushran as Raja
- Mohnish Bahl as Vikram Singh
- Kader Khan as Parshuram
- Anjana Mumtaz as Mrs. Parshuram
- Alok Nath as Raja's father
- Rakesh Bedi as Pardesi
- Reema Lagoo as Raja's mother
- Ashok Saraf as Vikram's employee
- Sudhir as Sudhir, Vikram's employee

== Soundtrack ==
Song	Singer
"Pehle Pyar Ki Pehli"	Udit Narayan, Kavita Krishnamurthy
"Aao Chalo Bhag Chalen"	Udit Narayan, Alka Yagnik
"Kya Tumhe Pata Hai"	Udit Narayan
"Tera Gham Agar"	Mohammed Aziz
"Har Pal Mere Hothon Par"	Udit Narayan, Kavita Krishnamurthy
"Kya Tumhe Pata Hai"	Alka Yagnik
"Jo Karte Hain"	Mohammed Aziz
