= Gudgudee =

- Poster
- Directed by: Basu Chatterjee
- Written by: Basu Chatterjee
- Produced by: Mahesh Bhatt
- Starring: Anupam Kher; Pratibha Sinha; Jugal Hansraj
- Music by: Bappi Lahiri
- Release date: 4 April 1997
- Running time: 138 minutes
- Language: Hindi

Gudgudee (lit. 'Tickle') is a 1997 Indian comedy film directed by Basu Chatterjee.

== Plot ==
Ajay Prasad is naive and easily influenced. He has been married for several years and lives with his wife and son in a remote part of India. Ajay often imagines absurd things, making himself look ridiculous. His family receives an invitation to a wedding in Bombay. As his wife, Sunita Prasad, and their son are unable to attend, Ajay is asked to go alone. In Bombay, he is met at the airport by Ravindranath, also known as Ravi, who welcomes him and drives him to his apartment in a wealthy area. Ajay finds out that his neighbour Chandni, who lives next door, is a single, jovial and beautiful woman who acts in commercials and short advertisements. Ajay begins an affair with her, with hilarious and comedic results.

== Cast ==
- Anupam Kher as Ajay Prasad
- Pratibha Sinha as Chandni
- Jugal Hansraj as Sameer
- Deb Mukherjee as Shekhar
- Satish Kaushik as Ravindranath "Ravi"
- Mushtaq Khan as Dr. M.M Surmawala
- Jaya Bhattacharya as Mohini
- Dolon Roy as Mano, Office Secretary
- Naresh Suri as Manohar Lal
- Indira Mukherjee as Room Mate
- Murad Ali as Surat Smiling Model
- Master Wajid as Raja
- Pratibha Lonkar as Sunita
- Shahrukh Khan as himself (special appearance)

== Soundtrack ==
No.	Title	Singer(s)
1	"Har Pal Chahe Mera Dil"	Kumar Sanu
2	"Bikhri Hui Chandni"	Kavita Krishnamurthy, Vinod Rathod
3	"Kyu Phisalta Hai Dil"	Kumar Sanu
4	"Nazro Me Jadu Bhara"	Shivaji Chattopadhyay
5	"Mai To Pritam Ko"	Kumar Sanu, Kavita Krishnamurthy
6	"Mausam Suhana Hai"	Kumar Sanu, Kavita Krishnamurthy
