= Pokiri Raja =

- Theatrical release poster
- Directed by: A. Kodandarami Reddy
- Written by: Paruchuri Brothers (dialogues)
- Screenplay by: A. Kodandarami Reddy
- Based on: Aankhen
- Produced by: A. Venkat Rami Reddy
- Starring: Venkatesh; Roja; Pratibha Sinha
- Cinematography: V. Pratap
- Edited by: Marthand K. Venkatesh
- Music by: Raj–Koti
- Production company: L V S Productions
- Release date: 12 January 1995
- Running time: 145 minutes
- Country: India
- Language: Telugu

Pokiri Raja is a 1995 Indian Telugu-language action film, produced by A. Venkat Rami Reddy under L V S Productions and directed by A. Kodandarami Reddy. It stars Venkatesh, Roja, Pratibha Sinha, Ali with music by Raj–Koti. Venkatesh played a double role in the film. It was a remake of the Hindi film Aankhen which was inspired from Kannada film Kittu Puttu which itself was based on Tamil film Anubavi Raja Anubavi.

== Plot ==
The story begins with the arrest of international stock market broker Ashok Kumar, who has cheated the public of ₹2000 crores; the court decides to keep him under the supervision of the Chief Minister. A mafia gang leader, Vicky, plans to help Ashok Kumar escape from jail by doing plastic surgery on his younger brother, Bhadram, to look like the CM.

Simultaneously, a wealthy industrialist, Ananda Rao Naidu, always has problems with his mischievous son Chanti and nephew Nani. The two are notorious slackers, always up to no good, and involved in elaborate practical jokes; they fall in love with Prathiba and Nikita. It comes to Ananda Rao's attention that his son and nephew have lied about their college grades in studies and sports. As a result, they are kicked out of college and ultimately from their home.

Later, they protect the CM's son from an accident, and the CM invites them for coffee; at the same time, Vicky plans an attack on the CM in which his wife and son die, and the CM is injured. Chanti and Nani follow them and come to know everything regarding their plan; in the attack, Nani escapes, but Chanti disappears, presumed dead. Nani gets involved in a conspiracy to kill Chanti, and he is arrested. At the same time, the gangsters change CM from the hospital and replace him with their duplicate.

Meanwhile, in a small Indian village, Narasimha, twin brother of Ananda Rao Naidu, who was separated in childhood, his son Balaraju Chanti's identical cousin arrives in town with his fiancée Chandra Mukhi. At the same time, Chanti is also found alive, and both of them get exchanged, which leads to hilarious misunderstandings, and the remaining story is about who protects the CM in the climax.

== Cast ==
- Venkatesh as Chanti and Balaraju (Dual role)
- Pratibha Sinha as Pratibha (Voice dubbed by Shilpa)
- Roja as Chandramukhi (Voice dubbed by Roja Ramani )
- Ali as Nani
- Giri Babu as Rama Chandra Murthy & Dhanraj (Dual role)
- Kaikala Satyanarayana as Ananda Rao Naidu & Narasimha (Dual role)
- Brahmanandam as Raja
- Sarath Babu as CM & Brahmam (Dual role)
- Tanikella Bharani as Inspector Prem Chand
- Mohan Raj as Vicky
- K. Ashok Kumar as Ashok Kumar
- Chalapathi Rao as DCP
- Maharshi Raghava as Ashok Kumar's brother
- Vidyasagar as Security officer
- Chitti Babu as Lecturer
- Gundu Hanumantha Rao as Thief
- Ananth Babu as Thief
- Gautam Raju
- Sarathi as Principal
- K. K. Sharma
- Kallu Chidambaram as Thief
- Ironleg Sastri as Raja's father
- Jenny as Lecturer
- Subhashri as Nikitha
- Sudha as CM's wife
- Jyothi Lakshmi as Kanya Kumari
- Radha Kumari as Ananda Naidu's sister
- Vichithra as Chitra
- Telangana Shakuntala as Ramulamma
- Dilip Kumar Salvadi as CM's son

== Soundtrack ==
Pokiri Raja

Film score by Raj–Koti
- Released: 1995
- Genre: Soundtrack
- Length: 31:26
- Label: SMARL SOURABH
- Producer: Raj–Koti

Raj–Koti chronology
Raja Simham (1995)	Pokiri Raja (1995)	God Father (1995)

Soundtrack was composed by Raj–Koti

Track list
No.	Title	Lyrics	Singer(s)	Length
1.	"Gampa Kinda Kodi Petta"	Veturi	S. P. Balasubrahmanyam, K. S. Chithra	5:15
2.	"O Erratolu Pilla"	Jonnavithhula Ramalingeswara Rao	S. P. Balasubrahmanyam, K. S. Chithra, S. P. Sailaja	5:00
3.	"Okkokka Vana Chukka"	Sirivennela Seetharama Sastry	S. P. Balasubrahmanyam, K. S. Chithra	5:07
4.	"Kalaga Ochinavu"	Sirivennela Seetharama Sastry	S. P. Balasubrahmanyam, K. S. Chithra	5:04
5.	"Kottandayya"	Sirivennela Seetharama Sastry	S. P. Balasubrahmanyam	5:21
6.	"Oye Oye"	Sirivennela Seetharama Sastry	S. P. Balasubrahmanyam, K. S. Chithra	5:32
Total length:				31:21
