= Tu Chor Main Sipahi =

1996 film by Guddu Dhanoa

- DVD Cover
- Directed by: Guddu Dhanoa
- Written by: Robin Henry; Rumi Jaffery (dialogues)
- Produced by: Namrata Dehal
- Starring: Akshay Kumar; Saif Ali Khan; Tabu; Pratibha Sinha; Amrish Puri; Anupam Kher
- Cinematography: Sripad Natu
- Edited by: V. N. Mayekar
- Music by: Dilip Sen; Sameer Sen
- Release date: 10 May 1996
- Running time: 152 minutes
- Country: India
- Language: Hindi
- Budget: est. ₹ 4.25 crore
- Box office: est. ₹ 10.78 crore

Tu Chor Main Sipahi (English: You're the thief, I'm the cop) is a 1996 Indian action film starring Akshay Kumar, Saif Ali Khan, Tabu and Pratibha Sinha. It was directed by Guddu Dhanoa and written by Rumi Jaffery and Robin Henry.

== Plot ==
Raja is a notorious criminal who robs wealthy people under the alias King. Inspector Amar Verma is tasked with tracking him down, and the Mumbai Police are determined to arrest him. The situation worsens when King robs the commissioner's house. Commissioner Kushal Singh gives Verma four days to arrest King, threatening to transfer him to Tandarikala, a remote location known as the graveyard of policemen, from which few officers return alive.

Verma nearly succeeds in capturing King, but is injured in an encounter involving local bandits while transporting him. Taking advantage of the situation, King abandons Verma by the roadside and heads to Tandarikala, posing as a police inspector. Upon arriving, he discovers that the village is ruled by the ruthless Thakur Gajendra Singh, who leaves elderly men to fend for themselves and abducts young men, including minors, to work for him.

In Tandarikala, Raja is surprised to encounter Guddu, a village simpleton who bears a striking resemblance to Verma. It is subsequently revealed that Guddu is actually Verma, who has followed Raja to arrest him. However, after witnessing the villagers' suffering under the Thakur's oppressive rule, Verma changes his mind. He joins forces with Raja to end the Thakur's tyranny.

Together, they defeat the Thakur and his henchmen, killing them and liberating the village from their oppression. In the final scene, Verma handcuffs Raja, and the two share a laugh.

== Cast ==
- Akshay Kumar as Inspector Amar Verma/Guddu
- Saif Ali Khan as Raja
- Tabu as Kajal Singh
- Pratibha Sinha as Rani
- Amrish Puri as Thakur Gajendra Singh
- Anupam Kher as Police Commissioner Kushal Singh
- Deven Verma as ACP Verma, Amar's dad
- Harish Patel as Home Minister Ibu
- Rajesh Puri as Moti , Commissioner's doctor
- Narendra Gupta as Chote Khan
- Brahmachari as Biharilal
- Ankush Mohit as Vikram
- Gyan Shivpuri as Himmat Singh

== Music ==
Music by Dilip Sen-Sameer Sen. Lyrics by Anand Bakshi. Most popular songs in album "Hum Do Premee", "Chal Kar Le Thoda Pyar" etc.

#	Song	Singer
1.	"Hum Do Premee"	Kumar Sanu, Alka Yagnik
2.	"Chal Kar Le Thoda Pyar"	Kumar Sanu, Poornima
3.	"Jaaneman Jaane Jaa"	Kumar Sanu, Kavita Krishnamurthy
4.	"Bolo O Gori"	Kumar Sanu, Alka Yagnik
5.	"Kuchh Ho Gaya"	Kumar Sanu, Alka Yagnik
6.	"Tak Dhina Tak Dhina"	Kumar Sanu, Alka Yagnik
7.	"Ye Aag Thi Dil Mein"	Alisha Chinai
