= Roadside Romeo =

- Theatrical release poster
- Directed by: Jugal Hansraj
- Written by: Jugal Hansraj
- Produced by: Aditya Chopra
- Starring: Saif Ali Khan; Kareena Kapoor; Jaaved Jaaferi; Vrajesh Hirjee; Sanjai Mishra
- Cinematography: Anshul Chobey
- Edited by: Arif Ahmed
- Music by: Salim–Sulaiman
- Production companies: Yash Raj Films; Walt Disney Pictures
- Distributed by: Yash Raj Films
- Release dates: 23 October 2008 (Kuwait); 24 October 2008 (India)
- Running time: 93 minutes
- Country: India
- Languages: Hindi; English
- Box office: ₹6.46 crore

Roadside Romeo is a 2008 Indian animation musical romantic comedy film written and directed by Jugal Hansraj in his directorial debut, and produced by Aditya Chopra and Yash Chopra under the Yash Raj Films banner. The film features the voice talents of Saif Ali Khan and Kareena Kapoor, marking their first voice-over performances in an animated production. The narrative follows Romeo, a pampered dog left to fend for himself on the streets of Mumbai, who falls in love with Laila, a glamorous canine performer, while facing opposition from the local dog mafia.

The film marked Yash Raj Films' first foray into animation and was co-produced in association with Walt Disney Pictures. It was the second Bollywood film to be released in North America by a major Hollywood studio, following Sony Pictures' Saawariya (2007). Visual effects and animation were provided by Tata Elxsi, with a team of over 150 artists contributing to the production.

Released theatrically on 24 October 2008, Roadside Romeo received mixed reviews from critics, who praised the animation quality but criticized its screenplay, story, humor and lack of emotional depth. Despite the promotional backing and international distribution, the film underperformed at the box office. A racing video game based on the film was developed by UTV Indiagames and released for mobile platforms.

== Plot ==
Romeo is a dog who once lived in luxurious surroundings. One day his owners decide to immigrate to London, and he is left at the mercy of the servant of the house, who dumps him on the streets of Mumbai. Left to fend for himself, he is soon cornered by the local gang – Guru, Interval, Hero English, and a dog-wannabe-cat, Mini, who tell him that this is their domain. Romeo does not know the street lingo and is at a loss for words at first, but he manages to win the gang over by giving them haircuts. They love their new looks and accept Romeo as part of their gang. Together, they set up a successful dog-grooming business until Chhainu, the right-hand of gangster-dog Charlie Anna, arrives to collect "weeklies" (weekly protection money) in the form of bones. Romeo throws Chhainu out, and the others, terrified, go to Charlie to plead their case. Charlie threatens them with his trio of female ninja dogs, whom he calls his Angels, but Romeo tricks Charlie into allowing his friends to leave unhurt.

Romeo then meets Laila, who is singing from a rooftop; they dance, and he falls in love. To win her over, Laila tells Romeo he must dance with her in front of everyone at the "Moonlight Club," where she performs. Romeo says yes, unaware that Charlie has long wanted her, and anyone who dares go near her is punished. However, Romeo braves the odds and dances with Laila to win her heart. As Laila starts falling in love with him, Charlie, in a fit of rage, captures and terrorizes Romeo. Romeo then promises that he will make Laila fall in love with Charlie. Romeo does not intend to lose Laila but plans to deflate Charlie's ego by having a disguised Mini pretend to be Laila and make it clear she's not interested. This only ends up exacerbating Charlie's ire, and Romeo promises him a second meeting with Leila.

The night of the appointment, however, Chhainu catches Romeo kissing Laila, who then shouts at Romeo, telling Laila of Romeo's deal with Charlie, and she angrily and violently slaps him, and after she sees what Romeo had done, says she never wants to see him again despite Romeo's pleas for forgiveness. In a pursuit, Charlie's Angels are wooed by Guru, Interval, and Hero English; Chhainu is cornered by a mouse (and smashed with a "jumbo jet"), and Charlie is chased and caught by the city dogcatchers. But just before Charlie is caught with a net, Romeo pushes him under the dogcatcher's van to escape while Romeo goes. Charlie then convinces Guru, Hero English, Interval, and Mini to create a distraction to get the guard away from the van. They all succeed, and Charlie jumps on the van and says he will free Romeo using a pin in his chain to pick the lock, but the van begins to drive and he falls off, after which Charlie races after the van, losing the pin in the progress, but thankfully one of Charlie's ear hairs suffices.

They escape, but Romeo feels there is no point staying, as Laila said she never wanted to see him again, and Charlie badly wants her. The next morning, Romeo throws his sack onto an open train boxcar about to leave the station, but Charlie arrives with Laila and the others. Charlie tells Romeo that he is a fool for leaving Laila when she still loves him, that he explained everything to her and says she is Romeo's and no one else's. He lets go of her hand, and Laila begins to run after the train, while Romeo holds his hand out for her. Resembling a famous scene from Dilwale Dulhania Le Jayenge, Charlie remarks, "Where have I seen this before?". She reaches for his hand and grabs it, but the handle Romeo was holding had lost its top screws, making him fall off with Laila, after which they raise their heads to each other and say "I love you" in sync. It then goes to the "Moonlight Club," where everyone is back singing a reprise of "Main Hoon Romeo" in party remix.

== Voice cast ==
- Saif Ali Khan as Romeo, a Golden Retriever who is the former dog of a rich family.
- Kareena Kapoor as Laila, a beautiful white Afghan Hound and Romeo's love interest.
- Javed Jaffrey as Charlie Anna, an obese bulldog who is the Don of the slum, and is obsessed with Laila.
- Vrajesh Hirjee as Guru, a Bull Terrier who is the oldest and wisest among the four goons.
- Kiku Sharda as Hero English, a Siberian Husky the second member of the gang.
- Suresh Menon as Interval, a koolie who is the third member of the gang.
- Tannaz Irani as Mini, a tabby cat who is the final member of the gang, who is actually a girl.
- Sanjay Mishra as Chhainu, a wolf who is Charlie Anna's spy.
- Parzaan Dastur as mouse Romeo’s child

== Production ==
Roadside Romeo originated from Jugal Hansraj's long-standing interest in animation. He co-wrote the story with Aditya Chopra for Yash Raj Films, but the concept remained undeveloped until Hansraj was inspired by a group of stray dogs he saw playing in the dirt while waiting at a traffic signal in Mumbai. According to Hansraj, the image of a scruffy, carefree pack of street dogs helped him visualize the characters and tone of the film.

The project marked a significant collaboration between Yash Raj Films and The Walt Disney Studios. It was promoted as the first major co-production between an Indian studio and Disney in the field of animation.

Visual Computing Labs (VCL), a division of Tata Elxsi based in Bangalore, was responsible for the film's visual conceptualization, character design, animation, and final rendering. Production began in January 2007 and spanned over two and a half years, with approximately 21 months dedicated to animation work. A crew of 150 artists and technicians contributed to the film. The animation was produced using Autodesk Maya, with final rendering done on Autodesk Flame through a digital pipeline supported by EKA, Tata Elxsi's supercomputer, which was among the fastest in the world at the time. Color grading was completed by Prime Focus Technologies using Lustre software.

The production budget was not officially disclosed, though The Guardian reported an estimated cost of approximately US$7 million. The first teaser trailer debuted on 12 October 2007 alongside the theatrical release of Laaga Chunari Mein Daag, showcasing mock auditions for the character Romeo. A second trailer, featuring Laila's audition, was later released. Originally slated for a summer 2008 release, the film was postponed to coincide with the Diwali season.

For promotional purposes in India, costumes for the lead characters were specially crafted at Walt Disney World in Orlando. Yash Raj Films partnered with merchandise brand Hot Muggs to produce licensed coffee mugs featuring one-liners from the film such as "Tension Not," "Stay Cool," and "I'm Good Na."

Despite extensive promotion from Yash Raj Films and other Bollywood celebrities, lead voice actors Saif Ali Khan and Kareena Kapoor Khan did not actively participate in marketing the film. Kapoor cited prior commitments to promote her concurrent Diwali release Golmaal Returns, while Khan remained largely unavailable during the campaign.

The official website for Roadside Romeo was launched on 16 October 2008.

== Reception ==
=== Box office ===
Roadside Romeo was released on 24 October 2008, during the Diwali season, and faced strong competition from the film Heroes. It opened to a tepid response, recording occupancy of approximately 40–45% on its first day, which improved to around 60–70% by the end of the weekend. The film grossed ₹45 million (US$912,000) in its opening week, setting a then-record for a Disney production in India. Despite this, Box Office India declared the film a "disaster" at the Indian box office due to its high production costs and limited sustained earnings.

Internationally, the film was released in 40 theatres across the United States and Canada. It grossed US$41,770 (₹2.08 million) in its opening weekend, debuting at the 49th position on the North American box office chart, and earned a total of US$55,202 by the end of its second week. In the United Kingdom, it released across 23 theatres and earned £31,576 (₹2.47 million) in its first week. The film performed poorly in other international markets, grossing only US$13,233 (₹652,000) from 9 screens in Australia and US$604 (₹29,792) from 2 screens in New Zealand. In Kuwait, where it opened a day earlier on 23 October 2008, it earned US$14,549 in its first week of release.

=== Critical response ===
Roadside Romeo received mixed reviews from critics. On the review aggregator site Rotten Tomatoes, the film holds an approval rating of 50% based on six reviews.

Taran Adarsh of Bollywood Hungama awarded the film 3 out of 5 stars. He noted that while the animation quality was impressive and comparable to international standards, the film suffered from a predictable storyline and underwhelming music. He also pointed out that Charlie Anna's heavy South Indian accent was difficult to understand, even for adult viewers, which limited the film's accessibility for its intended child audience.

Raja Sen of Rediff.com gave the film 2 out of 5 stars. He praised the detailed animation and vibrant design but criticized the film's lack of narrative consistency. He concluded, “This is a well-animated movie with finely detailed backgrounds... the look works, but the story doesn't quite match up.”

Rachel Saltz of The New York Times gave the film a negative review, criticizing the character design and animation style. She wrote, “The animated dogs in Romeo aren't particularly appealing... They look oddly naked and move awkwardly, which flattens the dance sequences and keeps the film earthbound.”

== Accolades ==
Award	Date of the ceremony	Category	Recipients	Result	Ref.
Screen Awards	14 January 2009	Best Animated FIlm	Roadside Romeo	Nominated	
Visual Effects Society	10 February 2009	Outstanding Visual Effects in an Animated Feature	Pankaj Khandpur; Sherry Bharda; Shrirang Sathaye; Suhael Merchant	Nominated	
National Film Awards	20 March 2010	Best Animated Film	Producer: Aditya Chopra; Director: Jugal Hansraj; Animator: Tata Elxsi/VCL	Won	

== Soundtrack ==
Roadside Romeo

Soundtrack album by Salim–Sulaiman
- Released: 30 September 2008
- Genre: Film soundtrack
- Labels: YRF Music; Walt Disney Records
- Producers: Aditya Chopra & Yash Chopra

The soundtrack of Roadside Romeo was released on 1 October 2008 at The Club in Andheri, Mumbai, during a promotional event attended by director Jugal Hansraj and actor Jaaved Jaaferi. The music was composed by Salim–Sulaiman, with lyrics written by Jaideep Sahni. The album features a mix of upbeat and romantic tracks intended to align with the film's animated narrative and youthful tone.

Joginder Tuteja of IndiaFM rated the soundtrack 2 out of 5 stars, remarking that "the songs in themselves are no great shakes and, except for a track or two, the remaining just passes muster." He further noted that the delayed release of the album might negatively impact its sales and concluded that its success would depend more on the film's visual appeal than its musical content.

No.	Title	Singer(s)	Length
1.	"Main Hoon Romeo"	Kunal Ganjawala	4:05
2.	"Chhoo Le Na"	Sunidhi Chauhan, KK & Sudesh Bhonsle	5:12
3.	"Cool Cool"	Saif Ali Khan, Jaaved Jaffrey, Marianne D'Cruz & Naresh Kamath	3:11
4.	"So Right"	Kunal Ganjawala & Gayatri Iyer	4:28
5.	"Apni Dumm Bhi Oonchi Ho"	Anushka Manchanda, Earl Edgar, Jugal Hansraj, Kunal Ganjawala & Salim Merchant	4:25
6.	"Rooftop Romance"		1:39
7.	"Main Hoon Romeo" (Roadside Remix by John Stewart & Salim Merchant)	Kunal Ganjawala	3:28
8.	"Chhoo Le Na" (Moonlight Club Mix by DJ Suketu)	Sunidhi Chauhan, KK & Sudesh Bhonsle	4:18

== See also ==
- Indian animation industry
- List of Indian animated feature films
- List of Disney theatrical animated features
- List of Walt Disney Pictures films
