= Ek Tha Raja =

- Promotional Poster
- Directed by: Dayal Nihalani
- Screenplay by: Sanjay Kumar
- Produced by: Ramesh J. Sharma
- Starring: Aditya Pancholi; Sunil Shetty; Saif Ali Khan; Neelam; Pratibha Sinha; Indrani Banerjee
- Cinematography: Shankar Bardhan
- Edited by: Kuldip Mehan
- Music by: Anand–Milind
- Release date: 12 January 1996
- Running time: 163 mins
- Country: India
- Language: Hindi

Ek Tha Raja is a 1996 Indian Hindi-language film directed by Dayal Nihalani. It stars Aditya Pancholi, Sunil Shetty, Saif Ali Khan, Neelam, Pratibha Sinha, Indrani Banerjee in lead roles, with Kader Khan, Aruna Irani, Shakti Kapoor, Aloknath, Mohan Joshi, Avtar Gill in other supporting roles.

== Plot ==
Lalchand Dogra lives in a palatial house with his wife, Anjana, and three sons, Sunny Dogra, Raj Dogra, and Jay Dogra. Due to circumstances beyond their control, all get separated, with Lalchand himself ending up serving time in prison for several years. Years later, Lalchand is released from jail and sets out to find his family and try to put the rest of his life together. What he does not know that Jay has been adopted by the Commissioner of Police, Paramjeet Singh, and is currently looking at ways to get Lalchand back in prison; Sunny has been hired as his bodyguard; and Raj has just received a contract to kill Lalchand at any cost. It looks like the Dogra family is headed for another separation - this time permanent. But, later the Dogra family gets reunited but at loss of Raj in quest to save his father and brothers.

== Cast ==
- Aditya Pancholi as Raj Dogra
- Sunil Shetty as Jay Dogra
- Saif Ali Khan as Sunny Dogra
- Neelam as Shilpa
- Pratibha Sinha as Kitty
- Indrani Banerjee as Jyoti
- Kader Khan as Lalchand Dogra
- Aruna Irani as Anjana Dogra
- Shakti Kapoor as Lakhpat
- Aloknath as Police Commissioner Paramjeet Singh
- Mohan Joshi as Baba
- Avtar Gill as Iqbal
- Shiva Rindani as Chhote
- Rana Jung Bahadur as Minister Ashish Mehra

== Soundtrack ==
The music was composed by Anand–Milind and the lyrics were penned by Sameer.

#	Title	Singer(s)
1	"Dekh Zara Paas"	Abhijeet, Jyoti
2	"Sawan Ki Raaton Mein"	Abhijeet, Kavita Krishnamurthy
3	"Topi Topi"	Abhijeet, Jolly Mukherjee, Poornima
4	"Hum Hai Kahan"	Abhijeet, Sadhana Sargam
5	"Kaun Hai"	Usha Uthup
6	"Halka Halka Chhaya"	Kumar Sanu, Sadhana Sargam
7	"Mere Khwabowale Raja"	Sunita Rao
