= Saif Ali Khan =

Indian actor and film producer (born 1970)

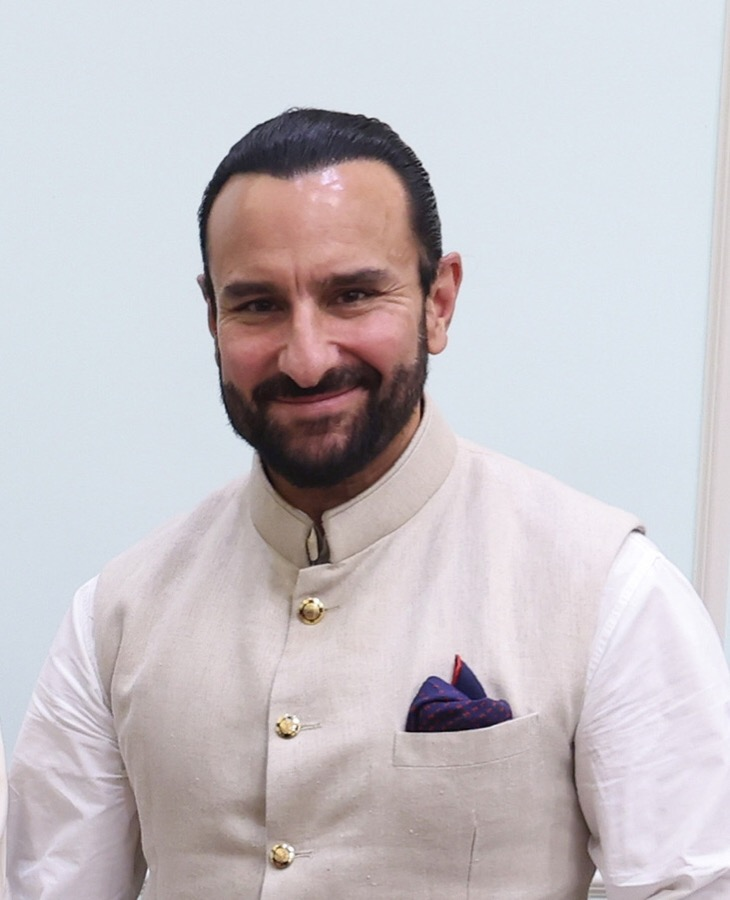
- Khan in 2024
- Born: Sajid Ali Khan Pataudi; 16 August 1970 (age 56); New Delhi, India
- Occupations: Actor; producer
- Years active: 1991–present
- Works: Full list
- Spouses: Amrita Singh (m. 1991; div. 2004) Kareena Kapoor (m. 2012)
- Children: 4 (including Sara and Ibrahim)
- Parents: Mansoor Ali Khan (father); Sharmila Tagore (mother)
- Family: Pataudi family
- Awards: Full list
- Honours: Padma Shri (2010)

Saif Ali Mansur Ali Khan Pataudi (born Sajid Ali Khan Pataudi; 16 August 1970) is an Indian actor and film producer who primarily works in Hindi films. The titular head of the Pataudi family since 2011, he is the son of actress Sharmila Tagore and cricketer Mansoor Ali Khan Pataudi. Khan has won several awards, including a National Film Award and seven Filmfare Awards, and received the Padma Shri, the fourth highest Indian civilian award in 2010.

Khan made his acting debut in Parampara (1993), and had success in the multi-starrers Yeh Dillagi (1994), Main Khiladi Tu Anari (1994), Kachche Dhaage (1999) and Hum Saath-Saath Hain (1999). In the 2000s, he gained praise and won multiple awards for his roles in the romantic comedies Dil Chahta Hai (2001) and Kal Ho Naa Ho (2003), and had success as a solo male star in the romances Hum Tum (2004), Parineeta, Salaam Namaste (both 2005) and Ta Ra Rum Pum (2007).

Khan also earned critical acclaim for playing a manipulative businessman in Ek Hasina Thi (2004), an apprentice in the English film Being Cyrus (2006) and the Iago character in Omkara (2006). He had further commercial success in the action thrillers Race (2008) and Race 2 (2013), and the romantic comedies Love Aaj Kal (2009) and Cocktail (2012). Between another string of under-performing ventures, Khan was appreciated for headlining Netflix's first original Indian series Sacred Games (2018–2019) and had his highest-grossing releases in the action films Tanhaji (2020) and Devara: Part 1 (2024).

Khan has been noted for his roles in a range of film genres—from crime dramas to action thrillers and comic romances. In addition to his film career, Khan is a frequent television presenter and stage performer, endorses various brands and products, and owns the production companies Illuminati Films and Black Knight Films. Khan was married to his first wife, Amrita Singh, for thirteen years, after which he married actress Kareena Kapoor. He has four children—two with Singh and two with Kapoor.

== Early life and family ==
Khan was born on 16 August 1970 in New Delhi, India to Mansoor Ali Khan Pataudi, a former captain of the India national cricket team, and his wife Sharmila Tagore, a film actress. Khan's father, who was the son of the last ruling Nawab of the princely state of Pataudi during the British Raj, received a privy purse from the government of India under terms worked out in the political integration of India, and was allowed to use the title Nawab of Pataudi until 1971 when the title was abolished. Following Mansoor Ali Khan's death in 2011, a symbolic pagri ceremony was held in the village of Pataudi, Haryana to "crown" Khan as the "tenth Nawab of Pataudi", which Khan attended to please the sentiments of the villagers, who wanted him to continue a family tradition. (Note: Official recognition of titles was ended by the Government of India in 1971.) Khan has two younger sisters, jewellery designer Saba Ali Khan and actress Soha Ali Khan.

He is the paternal grandson of Iftikhar Ali Khan Pataudi, who played for the Indian cricket team in England in 1946, and Sajida Sultan, the Nawab Begum of Bhopal. Hamidullah Khan, the last ruling Nawab of Bhopal was his great-grandfather, and the cricketer Saad Bin Jung is his first cousin. He is also the great-grandnephew of Nawab Begum of Bhopal Abida Sultan, the great-grandnephew of Major-General Sher Ali Khan Pataudi who served as the Chief of General Staff of the Pakistan Army, the grandnephew of Shahryar Khan (diplomat and former Chairman of the Pakistan Cricket Board) and Ashiq Hussain Qureshi (Pakistani cricketer), his paternal uncle Major-General Isfandiyar Ali Khan Pataudi (son of Sher Ali Khan Pataudi), has served as the Deputy Director General of Pakistan's ISI. He has also a family connection with Urdu poet Mirza Ghalib, as both Ghalib and Khan's paternal great-grandfather married daughters of the Nawab of Loharu.

Speaking about his childhood, Khan said that he was exposed to a "life beyond movies", and his mother described him as someone who was "not an easy child [...] He was impulsive [and] spontaneous." Saif grew up a Muslim. As a child, he recalls fond memories of watching his father playing cricket in the garden and has emphasized that his father's education and background had a lasting impression on how family life was conducted. Khan studied at The Lawrence School, Sanawar in Himachal Pradesh, and was later sent to Lockers Park School in Hertfordshire at the age of nine. He next enrolled at Winchester College and explained that "I did not take advantage of my tenure [there]. My classmates went on to Oxford and Cambridge, but I was not academically inclined. When I applied myself, which was not often, I stood first. I should have studied harder."

After graduating from the boarding school, Khan returned to India and worked for an advertising firm in Delhi for two months. He later appeared in a television commercial for Gwalior Suiting upon the insistence of a family friend, and was subsequently cast by director Anand Mahindroo. The project eventually got cancelled but Khan relocated to Mumbai to pursue a career in film; he recalls, "Finally I had some direction and focus. I remember [...] feeling so excited that I could go to Mumbai, stay in my own place and enjoy the adventure of starting my own career."

== Personal life and career ==
=== First marriage, early roles, and breakthrough (1991–2000) ===
In 1991, Khan was cast as the male lead in Rahul Rawail's romantic drama Bekhudi (1992) alongside debutante Kajol. After completing the first shooting schedule of the film, he was considered to be unprofessional by Rawail, and was replaced by Kamal Sadanah. While filming Bekhudi, Khan met actress Amrita Singh whom he married in October 1991. Singh gave birth to their daughter Sara in 1995, and to their son Ibrahim in 2001. The couple separated in 2004.

In 1993, Khan made his acting debut with Yash Chopra's Parampara. The film, which tells the story of two estranged brothers (played by Aamir Khan and Khan), failed to find a wide audience. The same year, he appeared opposite Mamta Kulkarni and Shilpa Shirodkar in the box office Hit Aashiq Awara and Average Grosser Pehchaan. For his performance in the former, Khan earned the Filmfare Award for Best Male Debut at the 39th Filmfare Awards.

Following an appearance in the successful Imtihaan (1994) with Raveena Tandon and Sunny Deol, Khan paired up with Akshay Kumar for his next two releases— Yash Raj Films' hit romantic comedy-drama Yeh Dillagi and the action film Main Khiladi Tu Anari. The former was an unofficial remake of the 1954 Hollywood film Sabrina, and depicted a love triangle between a chauffeur's daughter (played by Kajol) and the two sons of her father's employers (played by Kumar and Khan). Main Khiladi Tu Anari (the second film in the Khiladi series) featured Khan as an aspiring actor, and emerged as the fifth highest-grossing film of the year. Bollywood Hungama reported that the success of both films proved a breakthrough for Khan, and his performance in Main Khiladi Tu Anari fetched him his first nomination for the Best Supporting Actor at the Filmfare Awards. The Indian Express singled out his performances in both films, noting his comic timing in the latter kept the audience "in splits whenever he appears on screen". Khan's next two releases of the year, the dramas Yaar Gaddar and Aao Pyaar Karen, were unsuccessful. His career observed a steady decline through the 1990s; all nine films he starred in—Surakshaa (1995), Ek Tha Raja (1996), Bambai Ka Babu (1996), Tu Chor Main Sipahi (1996), Dil Tera Diwana (1996), Hameshaa (1997), Udaan (1997), Keemat: They Are Back (1998) and Humse Badhkar Kaun (1998)—were commercially Average Grossers and some unsuccessful. During this time, critics perceived his career to be over.

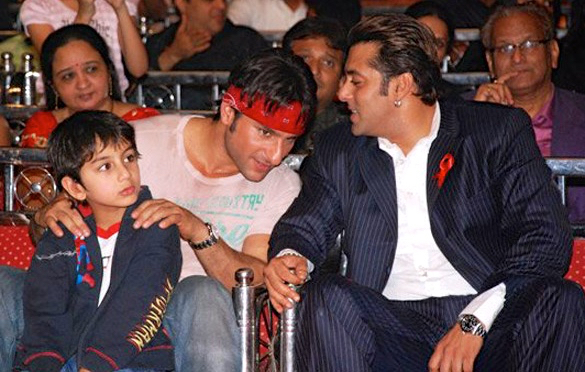
Pictured with co-actor Salman at an event for World Aids Day in 2007, with whom he co-starred in the ensemble drama Hum Saath-Saath Hain (1999)—Khan's biggest commercial success of the decade.

After four consecutive years of poorly-received films, Khan's career prospects began to improve in 1999; he appeared in four films: Yeh Hai Mumbai Meri Jaan, Kachche Dhaage, Aarzoo, and Hum Saath-Saath Hain. The romantic comedy Yeh Hai Mumbai Meri Jaan (alongside Twinkle Khanna) and the romance Aarzoo (alongside Madhuri Dixit and Akshay Kumar) earned little at the box office, but the action-thriller Kachche Dhaage (a story about two estranged brothers becoming the target of a terrorist conspiracy) was Khan's first commercial success since Main Khiladi Tu Anari and Imtihan . Directed by Milan Luthria, the film was generally well received, but critics noted that Khan was overshadowed by co-actor Ajay Devgn. The film, however, earned Khan his second Best Supporting Actor nomination at Filmfare. Khan described his final release of the year, the Sooraj Barjatya-directed family drama Hum Saath-Saath Hain, as a "morale-booster". The film featured an ensemble cast (Mohnish Behl, Tabu, Salman Khan, Sonali Bendre and Karisma Kapoor) and emerged as the highest-grossing film of the year, earning over ₹800 million (US$8.3 million) worldwide. During the filming of Hum Saath-Saath Hain, Khan was charged with poaching two blackbucks in Kankani along with co-stars Salman, Tabu, Bendre and Neelam Kothari. That year, he also appeared briefly in the David Dhawan-directed comedy Biwi No.1, a box office hit.

The drama Kya Kehna by director Kundan Shah was Khan's only release of 2000, in which he played the casanova Rahul Modi. Co-starring alongside Preity Zinta and Chandrachur Singh, Khan compared the portrayal of his character with his own evolving maturity as a father. The film addressed themes of single parenthood and teenage pregnancy, and emerged as a sleeper hit. The Indian Express believed Khan "looks debauched enough to be the rogue he plays. He is the only dark aspect in a film that is sunny and bright even at its most tragic."

=== Rise to prominence (2001–2004) ===
In 2001, Khan appeared in Eeshwar Nivas' box office flop Love Ke Liye Kuch Bhi Karega, (a film loosely inspired by the 1996 black comedy Fargo). Following this, he featured alongside Aamir Khan and Akshaye Khanna in Farhan Akhtar's coming-of-age comedy drama Dil Chahta Hai. Depicting the contemporary routine life of Indian affluent youth, it is set in modern-day urban Mumbai and focuses on a major transitional period in the lives of three young friends. Khan played Sameer Mulchandani, a "hopeless romantic", and was particularly drawn to the qualities of his character. Dil Chahta Hai was very popular with critics and won the National Film Award for Best Feature Film in Hindi. The film performed well in big cities, but failed in rural areas, which was attributed by critics to the urban-oriented lifestyle it presented. The feature marked a significant turning point in Khan's career, earning him the Filmfare Award for Best Performance in a Comic Role and awards for Best Supporting Actor at the Screen, Zee Cine and International Indian Academy (IIFA) ceremonies. Rediff.com wrote that Khan was able to rise above his "under-sketched character", and the critic Taran Adarsh described him as "excellent", arguing that it was his "career-best performance".

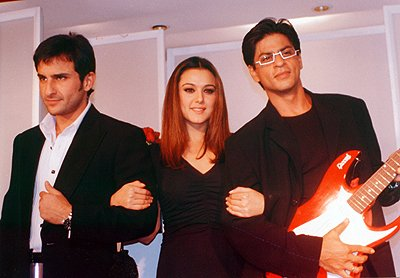
Khan pictured with Preity Zinta and Shah Rukh Khan at an event for Kal Ho Naa Ho in 2003

Following appearances in two poorly-received films (Rehnaa Hai Terre Dil Mein (2001) and Na Tum Jaano Na Hum (2002), Khan played a photographer in the second chapter ("No Smoking") of Prawaal Raman's anthology ensemble thriller Darna Mana Hai (2003). The film failed to find a wide audience and earned little at the box office.

Bollywood Hungama described his next film, the Nikhil Advani-directed romantic comedy-drama Kal Ho Naa Ho (2003), as a "landmark" in his career. Set in New York City, it was written by Karan Johar and co-starred Jaya Bachchan, Shah Rukh Khan and Preity Zinta. With a worldwide revenue of over ₹860 million (US$8.9 million), the film was received favourably by critics and became India's biggest hit of the year. It also did well internationally and became the highest-grossing film of the year overseas. Khan was cast in the role of Rohit Patel—a carefree young man who falls in love with Zinta's character—after Advani had seen his performance in Dil Chahta Hai. Writing for Outlook, Komal Nahta described Khan as a "natural" and "extremely endearing", and Ram Kamal Mukherjee from Stardust opined that he was successful in displaying "a gamut of emotions". Khan garnered several awards for his performance, including his first Filmfare Award for Best Supporting Actor, and expressed gratitude to Shah Rukh for teaching "me so much—mainly the responsibility of the main lead". He explained that the film's success led to Yash Raj Films casting him in the 2004 romantic comedy Hum Tum. At the end of the year, he appeared briefly as Cpt. Anuj Nayyar in J. P. Dutta's ensemble box office flop LOC Kargil.

In an attempt to avoid typecasting and broaden his range as an actor, Khan starred as Karan Singh Rathod in the 2004 thriller Ek Hasina Thi, a character he described as "a Charles Sobhraj-meets-James Bond kind of a guy". The film (which marked the debut of Sriram Raghavan) tells the story of a young woman (played by Urmila Matondkar) who meets Khan's character and is subsequently arrested for having links with the underworld. When Khan was initially offered the project, he was unable to commit due to his busy schedule. However, he agreed when Raghavan approached him for the second time, and in preparation for the role, exercised extensively for six months to achieve the physical attributes of his character. Upon release, the film was positively received by critics, with Khan's performance earning praise. Film critic Anupama Chopra wrote that Khan gave "an accomplished performance", while The Deccan Herald opined that he was successful in "break[ing] out of the cool dude stereotype" and "hold[ing] his own in a movie that is completely Matondkar's." For his performance, Khan received nominations at the Screen, Zee Cine and IIFA ceremonies.

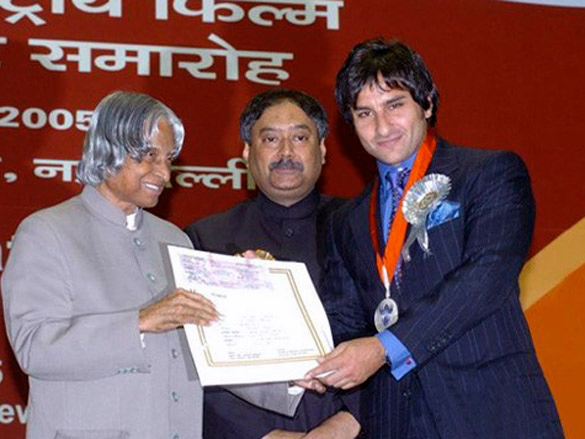
Pictured with Dr. A. P. J. Abdul Kalam (left) at the 52nd National Film Awards in 2005 where Khan won the Best Actor award for Hum Tum

For his next release, Khan starred opposite Rani Mukerji in Kunal Kohli's Hum Tum, a romantic comedy about two headstrong individuals meeting at different stages of their lives. He was cast in the role of Karan Kapoor (a young cartoonist and womanizer) after Aamir Khan was unable to do the film; Kohli said, "I realised that the role needed a younger man [...] someone who could present a more youthful picture. Saif has this unique quality, he can play a 21-year old as well as a 29-year old and was ideal for [the film]." With worldwide revenue of ₹426 million (US$4.4 million), the film proved one of the biggest commercial successes of the year and Khan's first success in which he played the sole male lead. Rediff.com wrote of his performance: "Saif reprises his urbane self from Dil Chahta Hai and Kal Ho Naa Ho, peppering it with occasional fits of introspection and angst, and marking himself as an actor whose time has come." He won the Filmfare Award for Best Performance in a Comic Role, in addition to his first nomination for the Filmfare Award for Best Actor, and was conferred the National Film Award for Best Actor at the 52nd National Film Awards amid much controversy. It marked the beginning of his work with Yash Raj Films, one of the largest production houses in Bollywood. In 2004, Khan began dating model Rosa Catalano; they separated three years later.

=== Established actor and film production (2005–2012) ===
In 2005, Rediff.com published that Khan had established himself as a leading actor in Hindi cinema with starring roles in the romantic drama Parineeta and the comedy-drama Salaam Namaste. An adaptation of Sarat Chandra Chattopadhyay's 1914 Bengali novella by the same name, Parineeta was directed by Pradeep Sarkar, and narrated the love story of an idealist (Lalita, played by Vidya Balan) and a musician (Shekhar, played by Khan), the son of a capitalist businessman. Although the film's producer, Vidhu Vinod Chopra, considered Khan too inexperienced for the part, he was persuaded by Sarkar who felt that Khan was perfect for the role. The film garnered critical acclaim upon release and Khan's portrayal earned him his second nomination for the Filmfare Award for Best Actor. Derek Elley from Variety wrote, "Khan, who has gradually been developing away from light comedy, again shows smarts as a substantial actor." Siddharth Anand's Salaam Namaste became the first Indian feature to be filmed entirely in Australia and went on to become the year's highest-grossing Bollywood production outside of India with worldwide ticket sales of ₹572 million (US$5.9 million). The film tells the story of a contemporary cohabiting Indian couple (Khan and Preity Zinta), and their subsequent struggle with an unexpected pregnancy. Khan played the role of Nikhil Arora, a single modern young man who leaves India to make his own life in Melbourne. The critic Taran Adarsh praised Khan for delivering his third successive performance and Khalid Mohamed noted that he "rescues several untidily written scenes with his neat wit and that flustered [...] facial expression."

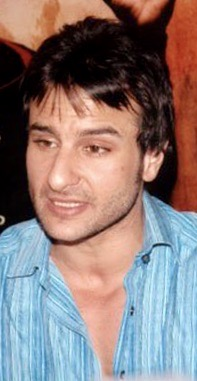
Khan at an event for Omkara in 2006

He next played the protagonist in the English language art film, Being Cyrus (2006), co-starring alongside Naseeruddin Shah and Dimple Kapadia. Directed by debutant Homi Adajania, the psychological drama revolves around a dysfunctional Parsi family with whom Khan's character moves. The film received predominantly positive reviews, and Khan was particularly praised. Later in the year, he portrayed the character of Iago in Omkara, the Indian adaptation of William Shakespeare's Othello. Directed by Vishal Bhardwaj, the film is a tragedy of sexual jealousy set against the backdrop of the political system in Uttar Pradesh. The film premiered at the 2006 Cannes Film Festival and was selected for screening at the Cairo International Film Festival. Omkara was received positively by critics, and Khan went on to receive widespread critical acclaim and accolades, earning the awards for Best Performance in a Negative Role at the Filmfare, Screen, Zee Cine and IIFA ceremonies; his performance was later included in the 2010 issue of the "Top 80 Iconic Performances" by Filmfare. Variety described it as a "powerhouse performance" and wrote that "[i]t is Khan's film through and through, in a performance of rugged, contained malevolence which trades on his previous screen persona as a likable best friend as well as his stint as the manipulative outsider in Being Cyrus. It is smart casting, superbly realized."

By 2007, Khan was keen on branching out into film production to "explore various genres of commercial and intellectually stimulating cinema". The critical success of Being Cyrus led him to create Illuminati Films and partner up with producer Dinesh Vijan, someone whom he shared a "like-minded perspective and ideology [...] with regard to cinema". Khan next reunited with producer Vidhu Vinod Chopra in the 2007 epic drama Eklavya: The Royal Guard alongside Amitabh Bachchan, Boman Irani, Sharmila Tagore, and Vidya Balan. Set in the state of Rajasthan during the early years of Indian independence, the movie revolves around a jealous and ungrateful ruler and his ailing wife. Although the film did not succeed at the box office, it was chosen as India's official entry to the Oscars. BBC Online described the film as a "cinematic experience" and praised Khan's growth as an actor, particular noting his scene with Bachchan's character. Following an appearance in the poorly-received action-comedy Nehlle Pe Dehlla (a production that had been delayed since 2001), Khan featured opposite Rani Mukerji in the 2007 family drama Ta Ra Rum Pum. Directed by Siddharth Anand, it received mixed reviews from critics, but earned over ₹690 million (US$7.2 million) in India and abroad. Writing for Hindustan Times, Khalid Mohamed praised Khan for displaying a new maturity, but Rajeev Masand thought that neither he nor Mukerji "are able to make much of an impression because their characters are so unidimensional and boring."

Khan achieved further success in 2008, starring in the Abbas–Mustan thriller Race with an ensemble cast including Anil Kapoor, Akshaye Khanna, Bipasha Basu, Katrina Kaif and Sameera Reddy. The feature was loosely adapted from the 1998 American film Goodbye Lover, and became one of the year's biggest box office hits, earning ₹1.03 billion (US$11 million) worldwide. CNN-IBN's Rajeev Masand found Khan to be a standout among the ensemble, adding that he has "the least dialogue, but the one who makes the best impression". This was followed by three projects produced by Yash Raj Films: the action-thriller Tashan, the fantasy comedy-drama Thoda Pyaar Thoda Magic, and the animated film Roadside Romeo, all of which were unsuccessful.

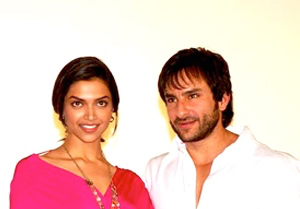
Khan with co-actor Deepika Padukone at an event for Love Aaj Kal in 2009; it was the first film to release under his production company Illuminati Films.

In 2009, Khan appeared in the romantic drama Sanam Teri Kasam, a production that had been delayed since 2000. The film garnered negative reviews and poor box office returns. Khan's role was small, and not well received. He next starred in his company's first project: Love Aaj Kal (2009), a romantic comedy-drama from the writer-director Imtiaz Ali. Featured opposite Deepika Padukone, the film documented the changing value of relationships among the youth, and Khan played dual roles—the younger version of Rishi Kapoor's character (Veer Singh) and Jai Vardhan Singh, an ambitious architect. Love Aaj Kal received highly positive reviews from critics and became one of the highest-grossing films of the year, earning over ₹1 billion (US$10 million) worldwide. Gaurav Malani of The Economic Times described his performance as "refreshing natural" and "outstanding". At the 55th Filmfare Awards, Love Aaj Kal was nominated for Best Film and Khan received his fourth nomination for Best Actor.

He then starred in the thriller Kurbaan alongside Kareena Kapoor, Vivek Oberoi and Dia Mirza. Produced by Dharma Productions, the film marked the directorial debut of Rensil D'Silva and featured Khan in the role of a terrorist. Upon release, Kurbaan was received favourably by critics and Khan's performance was critically acclaimed. A review in The Telegraph praised his "easy transition from a charming lover to a heartless man on a deadly mission."

In 2011, he appeared in Prakash Jha's multi-starrer drama Aarakshan. Set in the city of Bhopal, Madhya Pradesh, the film deals with the policy of caste-based reservations in government jobs and educational institutions. Khan portrayed Deepak Kumar, a rebellious student who joins the mafia. To prepare for the role, Khan was required to take acting workshops along with the rest of the cast. Prior to its release, the film was banned from release in select cities across India due to its controversial subject. While the film received a mixed critical reaction, his performance was generally well received. The following year, Khan produced both of his own films. For his first release, he collaborated once again with director Sriram Raghavan, as the protagonist in the action thriller Agent Vinod. Khan described it as his "most ambitious project", but the film opened to mixed reviews and eventually under-performed at the box office grossing ₹400 million (US$4.2 million) in India on a budget of ₹620 million (US$6.4 million).

In his next release, Homi Adajania's romantic comedy-drama Cocktail, he featured as software engineer Gautam Kapoor. Set in London, the film follows Kapoor's relationship with two temperamentally different women: an impulsive party girl (Veronica, played by Padukone) and a submissive girl next door (Meera, played by Diana Penty). Khan described the project as "a love story with a modern sensibility and treatment", and agreed to produce and feature in the film after his role was declined by Imran Khan. Critics were divided in their opinion of the film, but it emerged a financial success grossing over ₹1.2 billion (US$12 million) worldwide. Gaurav Malani of The Times of India described Khan's performance as "effortless" and noted that he was in his "comfort zone".

=== Career fluctuations and second marriage (2012–2015) ===
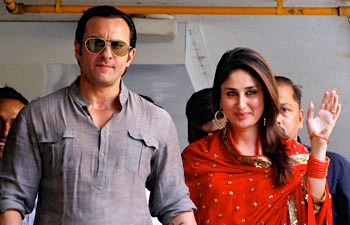
Khan with his wife Kareena at their registry marriage ceremony in 2012

On 16 October 2012, Khan married actress Kareena Kapoor after a five-year courtship in a private ceremony in Bandra, Mumbai. A reception was later held at The Taj Mahal Palace Hotel and the Lutyens Bungalow Zone in Mumbai and Delhi respectively. The couple have two sons, Taimur born in 2016 and Jeh born in 2021.

The following year, Khan collaborated with Padukone for the fourth time (alongside Anil Kapoor, John Abraham, Jacqueline Fernandez and Ameesha Patel) in Abbas–Mustan's Race 2 (2013), an ensemble action thriller that served as a sequel to Race (2008). The film received predominantly negative reviews from critics, but with a total collection of ₹1.62 billion (US$17 million), it proved to be a commercial success. He was next cast as Boris, a "Russian mafia don", in Raj Nidimoru and Krishna D.K.'s Go Goa Gone (described as "India's first zom-com") alongside Kunal Khemu and Vir Das. Khan, who bleached his hair for the film, was particularly drawn to the project for its novel concept and its "action, comedy and violence". The critic Rajeev Masand described the film as "a winning cocktail of laugh-out-loud dialogue and well-timed performances by the three leads", and in particular noted Khan's scene with Khemu's character. His final release of the year was Bullett Raja, a crime drama directed by Tigmanshu Dhulia, and co-starring Jimmy Shergill and Sonakshi Sinha. Khan explained that he found it challenging to play the role of Raja Mishra (a common man who turns into a gangster) and "totally relied" on Dhulia's guidance. Bullett Raja earned little at the box office and received predominantly negative reviews. Writing for Firstpost, Mihir Fadnavis found Khan to be "miscast" and described his performance as "farcial".

In an interview with The Times of India, Khan explained that he regretted starring in Sajid Khan's 2014 comedy Humshakals. Co-starring with an ensemble cast (Ritesh Deshmukh, Ram Kapoor, Bipasha Basu, Tamannaah and Esha Gupta), Khan portrayed three different characters in an attempt to "expand my market" and step out of his comfort zone. The Hindustan Times described it as a "dim-witted comedy" and criticised Khan for being "the worst thing about [the film]." He next produced and featured in Happy Ending (2014), a romantic comedy directed by Raj Nidimoru and Krishna D.K. NDTV's Saibal Chatterjee found Khan's character (a struggling writer) to be "a breezy rejig of his Hum Tum and Salaam Namaste persona of a decade ago", and noted that "the many collegiate hook-ups and break-ups he pulls off in Happy Ending do not look completely at odds with the film's purpose." Humshakals proved to be a commercial disaster and Happy Ending underperformed at the box office.

Following a brief appearance in the comedy Dolly Ki Doli (2015), he appeared alongside Kaif in Kabir Khan's counter-terrorism drama Phantom (2015). Based on the book Mumbai Avengers by Hussain Zaidi, the film is a retelling of the aftermath of the 26/11 Mumbai attacks. Khan was cast as Cpt. Daniyal Khan, a former soldier hired by the RAW agency. Phantom generated controversy when the Central Board of Film Censors deemed that the film represented Pakistan in a negative light and banned the film from being released there. A review in The Hollywood Reporter noted that Khan was "well cast" and "believable" in his role, and Rachit Gupta of Filmfare described his performance as "a heady mix of bravado and restrained intensity [which] works in parts only." Although Khan was pleased with the film's performance, Phantom was generally perceived to be a box-office failure grossing ₹844 million (US$8.8 million) worldwide on a budget of ₹720 million (US$7.5 million).

=== Commercial setbacks and professional expansion (2016–2022) ===
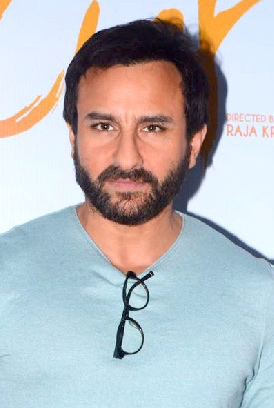
Khan at an event for Chef in 2017

During his year-long absence from the screen, Khan actively looked to play different parts, saying: "These are smarter movies, the interaction with them is deeply rewarding... I think I am finally beginning to understand my sense of style as an actor. I am developing my craft, understanding what acting and communication is." He found such a role in his second collaboration with director Vishal Bhardwaj, Rangoon (2017), an epic romance set during World War II. Cast alongside Shahid Kapoor and Kangana Ranaut, Khan drew inspiration from the mannerisms of his grandfather and the character Darth Vader to portray filmmaker Rustom "Rusi" Billimoria. Rajeev Masand termed the film "overlong, indulgent to the point of exhaustion", but praised Khan for "imbu[ing] Russi with the swagger and the arrogance of an aristocrat from the forties".

He next starred as the protagonist (Roshan Kalra) in 2017 comedy-drama Chef (an official adaptation of the 2014 film of the same name) from the director Raja Krishna Menon. Khan was pleased to work with Menon, and identified with the film due to its "modern, slightly unorthodox take on relationships". He drew upon several real-life experiences for his character, and trained at the JW Marriott Hotels in Mumbai in preparation. The film received generally positive reviews, with several commentators declaring that it was Khan's best performance to that point. Anupama Chopra wrote: "Khan get[s] his groove back... [He] doesn't play Roshan as a hero having a bad day. He gives us a flawed, fumbling man who is trying to repair the broken chords of his life." As with his last few releases, Rangoon and Chef earned little at the box office, leading trade analysts to question his commercial appeal.

Following an appearance in the poorly-received 2018 black comedy Kaalakaandi directed by Akshat Verma, Khan appeared as Inspector Sartaj Singh in India's first Netflix original series, the crime thriller Sacred Games, based on Vikram Chandra's novel of the same name. Cast alongside Nawazuddin Siddiqui and Radhika Apte, Khan was drawn by the opportunity to be part of a "creative zone, devoid of certain pressures and constraints that one would associate with the kind of films we normally do." The show received high critical acclaim; Ankur Pathak of HuffPost called it "a sure-shot winner" and took note of Khan's "stellar performance, one that [he] chews on slowly as he disappears into the broken persona of a tormented cop." In his next release, he starred as the businessman Skakun Kothari in Gauravv Chawla's Baazaar, a drama set against the backdrop of Mumbai's stock exchange market. Khan worked with Chawla to provide off-screen inputs, and was attracted to the idea of playing the antagonist, describing it as "a devious character" from the Indian epic poetry Mahabharata. The critic Udita Jhunjhunwala of Mint commended Khan for "blending the right amount of wickedness with willfulness", but Namrata Joshi found him to be "stiff [and] stern ... to communicate a rather facetious sense of menace." Baazaar was a box-office failure grossing ₹399 million (US$4.1 million) worldwide on a budget of ₹340 million (US$3.5 million).

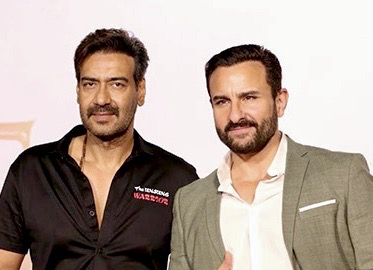
Pictured with co-actor Ajay Devgn at an event for Tanhaji in 2020. It marked their second collaboration and the film emerged as Khan's highest-grossing release.

Khan's desire to choose films based upon artistic merit rather than commercial appeal led him to feature as the protagonist in the 2019 action-drama Laal Kaptaan. Directed by Navdeep Singh, it is set in the 18th century and tells the story of a sadhu (Khan) who goes on a killing spree with the intention of exacting revenge upon a subedar. Filming in the barren landscape of rural Rajasthan proved physically daunting for Khan, and in preparation for the role he learned sword-fighting and horse-riding, and worked with a dialect coach to speak in a Rajasthani accent. He described it as "the hardest thing I have done so far", and considered the opportunity a critical learning experience that helped him personally and professionally; however, it failed at the box office. The Huffington Post praised Khan's decision to choose "morally ambiguous roles", but noted that he was "too wooden, bereft of any allure or mystery."

Khan began the new decade with a starring role in 2020's Tanhaji, a historical drama directed by Om Raut. Set in the 17th century, it revolves around the attempt by a Maratha warrior (played by Devgn) to recapture the Kondhana fortress from a Rajput fort keeper (played by Khan). He was attracted to the idea of starring in a "larger-than-life" film and felt challenged by Raut's insistence on overplaying his character; he explained that the process left him "very enriched" and he was pleased with the collaboration. Tanhaji was acclaimed by critics and emerged as a major commercial success, grossing over ₹3.67 billion (US$38 million) worldwide. Reviewing the film for Film Companion, Anupama Chopra found Khan's performance to be the film's prime asset, and credited him for playing "the exaggerated evil with a cheeky panache." The Hindustan Times opined that Khan had delivered his best performance to date, noting his "moments of mirth with his sinister laugh amid killing people." Tanhaji earned Khan his second Filmfare Award for Best Supporting Actor. His next release of the year was Jawaani Jaaneman, a comedy-drama about the life of a bachelor (played by Khan) who discovers that he has a daughter (played by Alaya Furniturewala). The feature was produced under his new company, Black Knight Films, and received generally positive reviews. Kunal Guha of Mumbai Mirror found that the film allowed Khan to "slip into a familiar-yet-age appropriate avatar in a refreshing coming-of-age story."

In 2021, Khan first appeared as a politician in Amazon Prime Video's drama series Tandav created and directed by Ali Abbas Zafar. The show opened amid protests and police complaints against its makers for allegedly insulting Hindu deities and hurting the religious sentiments of Hindus, following which Zafar cut several scenes and issued an apology. Critical reception was mixed. Khan then starred in the crime comedy Bunty Aur Babli 2 opposite Mukerji, and the horror comedy Bhoot Police alongside Arjun Kapoor. In 2022, he collaborated with Hrithik Roshan on the action film Vikram Vedha, a remake of the 2017 Tamil film. Saibal Chatterjee wrote that he "inhabits the character of the tough cop with conviction and exudes the external toughness that defines the man and his mission".

=== Telugu cinema and stabbing incident (2023–present) ===
Khan began 2023 by playing the villainous Lankesh in the mythological film Adipurush, inspired by the Hindu epic Ramayana, starring Prabhas as the heroic Raghava. It was filmed simultaneously in Hindi and Telugu. Budgeted at ₹500−700 crore (US$−73 million), it is one of the most expensive Indian films. It received negative reactions from both critics and audiences, and emerged as a box office bomb. In the following year, Khan had his second Telugu film release in the action film Devara: Part 1, starring N. T. Rama Rao Jr. Avinash Ramachandran of The Indian Express bemoaned that his performance suffered due to poor writing. With a gross of over ₹5 billion (equivalent to ₹5.3 billion or US$55 million in 2026), it emerged as the highest-grossing film of his career.

On 16 January 2025, Khan was stabbed multiple times during an attempted robbery inside his Mumbai residence. He was admitted to Lilavati Hospital for surgery. He sustained major injuries on his neck, back and waist. A neurosurgery was conducted on his spinal cord, where a piece of the knife was lodged which led to leaking spinal fluid. Hospital representatives reported that Khan was stable after surgery. He was discharged after five days. Using CCTV footage, Mumbai Police arrested Mohammad Shariful Islam Shahzad, a 30-year-old Bangladeshi national, as the culprit. In March 2025, Mohammad Shariful Islam appealed for bail in the case, claiming that he was falsely implicated by the police.

Following no release in 2024, Khan played a jewel thief in the 2025 Netflix action thriller Jewel Thief – The Heist Begins, alongside Nikita Dutta and Jaideep Ahlawat. Sukanya Verma criticised Khan's role but was appreciative of his "momentary banter" with Ahlawat.

== Off-screen work ==
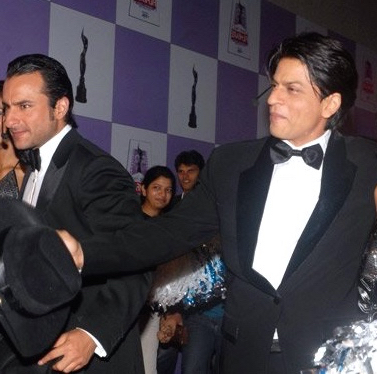
Khan co-hosted the Filmfare Awards five times with Shah Rukh Khan: 2003, 2004, 2008, 2010 and 2013. He also co-hosted once with Sonali Bendre in 2005.

=== Tours and ceremonies ===
Alongside his acting career, Khan has participated in several concert tours and televised award ceremonies. He performed in his first concert tour, Temptations 2004, with actors Shah Rukh Khan, Rani Mukerji, Preity Zinta, Arjun Rampal and Priyanka Chopra. Showcased in over 22 countries across the world, it became Bollywood's most prominent international concert to that point. In 2006, he was part of the Heat 2006 world tour along with Akshay Kumar, Preity Zinta, Sushmita Sen and Celina Jaitley. He later performed along with several other Bollywood personalities at the closing ceremony of the 2006 Commonwealth Games.

=== Music ===
In December 2005, Khan performed alongside the band Parikrama at the Mittal Gardens in New Delhi, and later reunited with them and Strings of Pakistan for The Royal Stag Mega Music Concert (a four-city concert tour) two years later, Khan playing the guitar during these performances.

=== Philanthropy ===
Since October 2011, Khan has taken over the responsibility of managing his father's eye hospital, and has also made public appearances to support various other charitable causes. In February 2005, Khan and several other Bollywood actors participated in the 2005 HELP! Telethon Concert to raise money for the victims of the 2004 Indian Ocean earthquake and tsunami. He took part in a charity cricket match organised by IIFA at Headingley Cricket Ground in West Yorkshire, England in 2007, and later hosted an event organised by the award ceremony to help raise funds for various charities in 2011. In November 2008, Khan performed in a concert to raise money for the victims of the 2008 Bihar flood and in September 2013, he attended a charity dinner organised by the Venu Eye Institute, donating two of his personal belongings to help raise funds for cataract operations. Later that year, he spent time with underprivileged kids during the filming of Bullett Raja. In October 2014, Khan was appointed as an ambassador for Olympic Gold Quest and donated ₹2 million (US$21,000) to help raise funds for the training of athletes.

== In the media ==
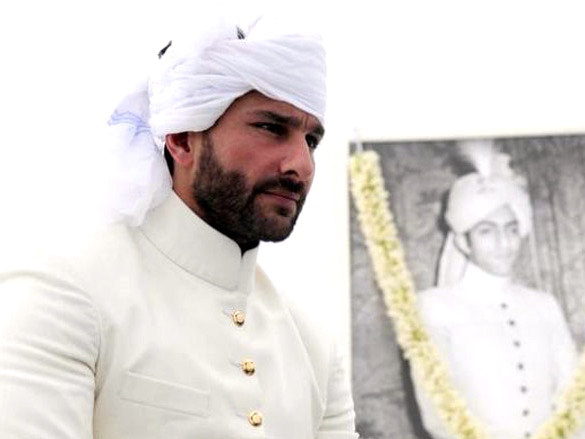
Khan at his pagri ceremony in October 2011 where he was anointed as the head of the Pataudi family.

In an interview with Rajeev Masand, Khan described himself as "a very private person". The journalist Roshmila Bhattacharya added, "Unlike most actors, his interests are not limited to box office collections and workout routines. [He] can converse on anything, from philosophy to politics, from sports to books and music." Filmfare wrote that earlier in his career, Khan gained a reputation for being arrogant, but later matured into "one of showbiz's biggest and most respected stars." During his career, he has played roles in both high-profile mainstream productions and lesser-publicised films by independent filmmakers, and he has appeared in a range of film genres, although he has found a niche playing roles in romantic comedies. The Tribune wrote that his roles in Dil Chahta Hai (2001), Kal Ho Naa Ho (2003), Hum Tum (2004), Salaam Namaste (2005), Love Aaj Kal (2009) and Cocktail (2012) were "essentially endearing pretty boys", and the success of these films established him as the "poster boy for romantic comedies". Beth Watkins explains the typical role Khan played in romantic comedies and its appeal:

"Perhaps related is his finesse for playing petulant, arrogant, almost insufferable young men in need of reform, which, this being Bollywood, they can easily achieve through the love of a good woman. Does his real-life golden status—with literature, cinema, cricket and royalty in his lineage—make him exceptionally effective at coming across as spoiled?"

One of the highest-paid actors in Bollywood, Khan is considered among the most popular and high-profile celebrities in India. He is known to commit heavily to each role and believes in "staying on a sharp learning curve". This commitment, combined with his busy schedule and heavy smoking, resulted in a health scare in 2007. Analysing his career, the journalist Shomini Sen noted that "[t]he actor was part of some major films in the early 1990s [...] yet critics wrote him of[f] due to lack of a screen presence and poor dialogue delivery." Critics noted that Dil Chahta Hai marked a major turning point for Khan, and credited him for pioneering a movement in actors being part of "a new genre of films which was more urban"; film historian Nasreen Munni Kabir stated that the film helped him find "his own style, combining great comic timing and a natural personality." Sen further explained that "his anglicized upbringing, which initially was a hindrance to his career, became his strongest point." Following his portrayal of a variety of character types in Ek Hasina Thi (2004), Parineeta (2005), Being Cyrus and Omkara (both 2006), Khan was noted for his versatility; India Today attributed his roles in these films to the establishment of a new image for leading actors in Bollywood, and The Tribune published that Khan had successfully "matured, both as an actor of substance and as a bankable star".

Starting in 2007, Khan's relationship with Kareena Kapoor became one of the country's most-reported celebrity stories, and they were listed amongst the top celebrity couple endorsers for brands and products worldwide. In a blog published by The Wall Street Journal, Rupa Subramanya described their marriage as India's "wedding and social event of the year". Kapoor gave birth to their son Taimur in December 2016. From 2012 to 2019, Khan was featured on Forbes India's "Celebrity 100", a list based on the income and popularity of India's celebrities. He peaked at the fifteenth position in 2012 and 2014 with an estimated annual earning of ₹642 million (US$6.7 million) and ₹629 million (US$6.5 million) respectively. In 2003, Khan placed fourth on Rediff's list of "Top Bollywood Male Stars". He was later ranked second in 2005, sixth in 2006, and seventh in 2007. In March 2011, Khan placed fifth on Rediff's list of "Top 10 Actors of 2000–2010". He was ranked among the top 30 on The Times of India's listing of the "Most Desirable Men" from 2010 to 2015, and has additionally featured in the UK magazine Eastern Eye's "World's Sexiest Asian Men" list in 2008, 2011 and 2012. In 2010 and from 2012 to 2014, Khan was featured as one of the best-dressed male celebrities in the Indian edition of GQ magazine.

== Accolades ==
Among Khan's film awards are a National Film Award for Best Actor and seven Filmfare Awards out of twelve nominations: Best Male Debut for Aashiq Awara (1993), Best Performance in a Comic Role for Dil Chahta Hai (2001) and Hum Tum (2004), Best Supporting Actor for Kal Ho Naa Ho (2003) and Tanhaji (2020), Best Performance in a Negative Role for Omkara (2006) and the "Moto Look of the Year" for Kal Ho Naa Ho (2003).

== See also ==
- List of Indian film actors

== Bibliography ==
- Chatterjee, Saibal; Deenvi, Gulzar; Nihalani, Govind (2003). Encyclopaedia of Hindi Cinema. Encyclopædia Britannica (India) Pvt. Ltd. ISBN 81-7991-066-0.
- Dutta, Anmol (15 October 2022). "Content Carnival? (Re)Viewing Representation, Indianness, and OTT Culture in India". In Samuel, Michael; Mitchell, Louisa (eds.). Streaming and Screen Culture in Asia-Pacific. Springer Nature. pp. 145–160. ISBN 978-3-031-09374-6.
- McNally, Karen (16 December 2010). Billy Wilder, Movie-Maker: Critical Essays on the Films. McFarland. ISBN 978-0-7864-4211-9. Archived from the original on 30 December 2016.
