= Kachche Dhaage =

1999 Indian film by Milan Luthria

- Theatrical release poster
- Directed by: Milan Luthria
- Written by: Anjum Rajabali; Dialogues by: Sanjay Chhel; Milan Luthria
- Produced by: Ramesh S. Taurani; Kamal S. Taurani
- Starring: Ajay Devgn; Saif Ali Khan; Manisha Koirala; Namrata Shirodkar
- Cinematography: S. Gopal Reddy
- Music by: Nusrat Fateh Ali Khan
- Distributed by: Tips Music Films
- Release date: 19 February 1999
- Running time: 148 mins
- Country: India
- Language: Hindi
- Budget: ₹10 crore
- Box office: ₹28 crore

Kachche Dhaage (transl. Fragile Bonds) is a 1999 Indian Hindi-language action thriller film directed by Milan Luthria starring Ajay Devgn, Saif Ali Khan, and Manisha Koirala. The film features Devgan as a smuggler, delivering goods across the Rajasthan-Pakistan border, was filmed in the deserts of Rajasthan and in Switzerland. It premiered on 19 February 1999 in Mumbai.

== Plot ==
Dhananjay (Saif Ali Khan) and Aaftab (Ajay Devgn) are half-brother each with a selfish approach to life; Aaftab is a petty smuggler, specialising in smuggling goods across the Rajasthan border into Pakistan whilst Dhananjay is a corporate yuppy from the city, with a high-flying lifestyle. Aaftab is in love with Rukshana (Manisha Koirala) but is rejected by her family because he is illegitimate. Dhananjay is dating Ragini (Namrata Shirodkar) and has his father's death to contend with.

When the brothers meet for the first time, they instantly loathe each other, having nothing in common. One night, Aaftab blows up a loaded truck while trying to steal from it and attracts a mass of unwanted enforcers. Soon, Aaftab is forced to send Dhananjay into a trap which ends up with them both being handcuffed and escaping from the Border Security Force, the Central Bureau of Investigation, and the border mafia who are attempting to incriminate the brothers for anti-national activities and murder. Fate forces them to escape on foot, on motorbikes, cars, stolen trucks, and still handcuffed to each other on a moving goods train. They run into difficult circumstances on the way, not in the least made better by their hatred for each other. Despite their initial differences, the two gradually learn to like and understand each other, eventually proving their innocence.

The climax of this film was shot around Jaisalmer, especially in Kuldhara, the desert village of Paliwal Brahmins.

== Cast ==
- Ajay Devgn as Aftab
- Saif Ali Khan as Dhananjay "Jai" Pandit
- Manisha Koirala as Rukhsana
- Namrata Shirodkar as Ragini Pandit
- Sadashiv Amrapurkar as CBI Officer Jadeja
- Govind Namdeo as Rana Baikunth
- Maya Alagh as Mariam
- Anupam Shyam as Bhagta' henchman
- Vineet Kumar as Bhagta
- Anu Kapoor as Kawali singer (Cameo appearance) in Is Shaan-e-Karam Ka Kya Kehna
- Parmeet Sethi (Cameo appearance) in Khali Dil Nahi
- Simran (Cameo appearance) in Khali Dil Nahi
- Mahavir Shah as Lawyer Arvind Chinoy
- Rajeev Verma as Justice Nariman Sohrab
- Rajesh Vivek as Noora
- Ishrat Ali as Maulvi Lambu Atta
- S. M. Zaheer as Ramakant Pandit

== Reception ==
=== Critical response ===
Suparn Verma of Rediff.com described Devgan as "effective" but disapproved of Koirala's performance, believing it was wasted. Verma noted a similarity with that of Soldier (1998) in that film too there was a troubled hero, a great many red herrings and a mysterious villain who pulls all the strings, but critics believed that Kachche Dhaage was a weaker film because it lacked the pace and focus.

=== Box office ===
The film was a box office success grossing ₹277 million at the domestic box office.

== Soundtrack ==
Kachche Dhaage

Soundtrack album by Nusrat Fateh Ali Khan
- Released: 7 December 1998
- Recorded: 1997
- Genre: Feature film soundtrack
- Length: 50:59
- Label: Tips Industries

The soundtrack, which featured a number of Punjabi folk tunes, proved popular amongst non Hindi audiences of the film. The music was composed by Ustad Nusrat Fateh Ali Khan, with lyrics by Anand Bakshi. According to the Indian trade website Box Office India, with around 30,00,000 units sold the soundtrack became the fifth highest-selling album of the year.Music was all time blockbuster all the songs massive hit especially track like "Khali Dil Nahin Jaan Bhi Hai", "Pyaar Nahin Karna Jahan", "Ek Jawani Teri Ek Jawani Meri" & "Dil Pardesi Ho Gaya", "Is Shaane Karam Ka" (Qawali), & "Oopar Khuda Aasman Neeche" (Female) etc.

- "Khali Dil Nahin Jaan Bhi Hai" – Alka Yagnik & Hans Raj Hans
- "Pyaar Nahin Karna Jahan" – Alka Yagnik & Kumar Sanu
- "Ek Jawani Teri Ek Jawani Meri" – Alka Yagnik & Kumar Sanu
- "Dil Pardesi Ho Gaya" – Lata Mangeshkar & Kumar Sanu
- "Is Shaane Karam Ka" (Qawali in Raga Gurjari Todi) – Nusrat Fateh Ali Khan
- "Oopar Khuda Aasman Neeche" (Female) – Lata Mangeshkar
- "Band Lifafa Dil Mera" (Not included in film) – Lata Mangeshkar & Kumar Sanu
- "Oopar Khuda Aasman Neeche" (Male, Not included in film) – Sukhwinder Singh
