= Main Khiladi Tu Anari =

1994 Indian film by Sameer Malkan

- Theatrical release poster
- Directed by: Sameer Malkan
- Screenplay by: Sachin Bhowmick, Kader Khan (dialogues)
- Story by: Sachin Bhowmick
- Based on: The Hard Way by John Badham
- Produced by: Champak Jain
- Starring: Akshay Kumar; Saif Ali Khan; Shilpa Shetty; Rageshwari; Shakti Kapoor; Kader Khan
- Cinematography: Akram Khan
- Edited by: Suresh Chaturvedi
- Music by: Anu Malik
- Production company: Venus Movies
- Distributed by: United Seven Creations
- Release date: 23 September 1994
- Running time: 184 minutes
- Country: India
- Language: Hindi
- Budget: ₹32.5 million
- Box office: ₹138.4 million

Main Khiladi Tu Anari (transl. 'I'm a player; you're a novice') is a 1994 Indian Hindi-language buddy action comedy film directed by Sameer Malkan. The screenplay is written by Sachin Bhowmick. Starring Akshay Kumar, Saif Ali Khan, Shilpa Shetty and Raageshwari in the lead roles and Shakti Kapoor, Johnny Lever and Kader Khan in supporting roles. The film became one of the five highest-grossing Indian films of the year. The film is partly inspired by the 1991 American film The Hard Way.

The film's success cemented Akshay Kumar and Saif Ali Khan’s status as Bollywood's leading men, and a successful pair of bankable stars following Yeh Dillagi (1994), which was their first collaboration. Kumar in particular, who also had 1994 hits like Mohra, Suhaag, and Elaan, gained a considerable fan following, especially among the youth. He became renowned for his thrilling action scenes featuring martial arts and hand-to-hand combat; his daring stunts; his athletic dance moves and his rugged, macho good looks. The film also marked the iconic co-actor buddy pairs of Kumar and Khan.

Khan's performance in the film earned him a Best Supporting Actor nomination at the 40th Filmfare Awards. The film was remade in Telugu as Hello Guru.

== Plot ==
One of the most respected inspectors, Arjun Joglekar, is killed by drug dealer and gangster Goli. Mona, a cabaret singer and Goli's mistress, agrees to testify against Goli and is placed into witness protection by Inspector Karan, Arjun's younger brother, who aims to fight any injustice and avenge his brother's murder. When Goli finds out about Mona's forthcoming testimony which would expose his real identity, he tracks her down and kills her and Karan, despite being present at the scene, is unable to do anything. Karan approaches the DCP for a warrant to arrest Goli but, the DCP refuses, saying it will be futile since Goli is an influential person.

Deepak Kumar, who is the most romantic actor around, is frustrated with his roles and for being type-cast as a romantic hero. He would like to do something different and bring some change and excitement to his dull and boring existence. To change his monotonous life, he gets drunk and drives around. He is arrested by the police and brought to his rowdy producer. Karan also arrives at the place to confront the producer for molesting a girl who had come to him earlier for a job. When the producer refuses to comply and calls goons to threaten Karan, the latter thrashes them all, impressing Deepak, who would like to study his behaviour so that he can use this as a background for his next movie.

Karan meets Basanti, who looks identical to Mona. He tells Deepak that the latter can hang around him if Deepak can get Basanti to act as Mona. Deepak trains Basanti and presents the new "Mona" to Karan. Karan places Basanti at the Moonlight Hotel as an amnesiac Mona, where she can report Goli's criminal activities. While Karan and Basanti fall in love with each other; Deepak falls in love with Karan's sister, Shivangi, which makes Karan mad and he tries to get rid of Deepak and almost succeeds in doing so. However, Deepak finds out and angrily confronts Karan, and leaves the house. Karan's sister is heartbroken; his sister-in-law makes him realize his wrongdoing. A remorseful Karan goes to Deepak and apologizes to him; Deepak forgives him and the two make out.

Meanwhile, Goli has started seeing Karan as a thorn in his illegal activities and decides to have him killed. However, constable Ramlal, who is loyal to Karan, spots the assassin and takes the bullet. Karan is unable to save Ramlal, who dies in his arms making Karan even more determined to get Goli. Goli finds out the truth about Basanti, who tells him that Karan has already found some incriminating evidence against him and will be presenting it in court. Goli calls Karan and tells him to hand over the evidence to him in exchange for Basanti's life. Deepak meets Goli to give him some films supposedly containing the evidence Goli wanted and tells him to hand over Basanti before Karan comes with the police to arrest him. However, Goli reveals to have also kidnapped Karan's sister and sister-in-law, much to Deepak's shock and dismay. Karan, who has been hiding with a gun some distance away, starts shooting at Goli and succeeds in gunning down many of his henchmen, while Deepak tries to escape with the three ladies in a car. Unfortunately for them, the car breaks down and Karan's location is also revealed, resulting in all of them getting captured. Goli holds Deepak, Basanti, Karan's sister and sister-in-law hostage and tortures Karan for the evidence. Karan pretends to faint and gets into a brutal fight with one of Goli's henchmen (the same one who killed his brother) and ultimately kills him. He then opens Deepak's bonds and a huge fight ensues between the duo and Goli and his cronies, which ends with Goli's death at Karan's hands.

In the end, everyone goes to watch Deepak's new movie. Halfway through the movie, Karan realizes that Deepak's dialogue resembles the same things he once himself had said to Deepak and walks away in a huff. Outside the hall, he meets Deepak, and the two share a smoke with Deepak accidentally setting fire to his own pants but douses it immediately. The two friends share a laugh as the film ends and the credits roll in.

== Cast ==
- Akshay Kumar as Inspector Karan Joglekar
- Saif Ali Khan as Deepak Kumar
- Shilpa Shetty as Mona / Basanti (Dual role)
- Rageshwari as Shivangi Joglekar
- Shakti Kapoor as Goli
- Kader Khan as Ram Lal / DCP (dual role)
- Goga Kapoor as Damodar
- Johny Lever as Dhansukh
- Mukesh Khanna as Arjun Joglekar
- Raveena Tandon as herself (special appearance in the song "My Adorable Darling")
- Beena Banerjee as Seema Joglekar
- Anant Mahadevan as himself
- Shiva Rindani as Goli's henchman/assassin
- Prantik khan as Pratik
- Pronoy dey as pronoy

== Soundtrack ==
The music of the film was scored by Anu Malik. Singers Asha Bhosle, Kumar Sanu, Abhijeet Bhattacharya, Udit Narayan, Pankaj Udhas, Alka Yagnik, Anu Malik and Alisha Chinai rendered their voices in this album. The lyrics were penned by Rani Malik, Rahat Indori, Hasrat Jaipuri, Maya Govind, Zameer Kazmi and Anwar Sagar. "Churake Dil Mera" and "Paas Woh Aane Lage" were the most popular songs from the soundtrack. "Zuban Khamosh Hoti Hai" which was part of the soundtrack was picturised, but not included in the final version of the film. Music was chart buster, according to the Indian trade website Box Office India, with around 30,00,000 units sold the soundtrack became the fifth highest-selling album of the year.

Two songs from the soundtrack, "Chura Ke Dil Mera" and "Main Khiladi" were recreated in Hungama 2 and Selfiee, respectively.

| No. | Title | Singer(s) | Length |
|---|---|---|---|
| 1. | "Chura Ke Dil Mera" | Kumar Sanu, Alka Yagnik | 07:55 |
| 2. | "Paas Woh Aane Lage" | Kumar Sanu, Alka Yagnik | 06:12 |
| 3. | "Main Khiladi Tu Anari" | Abhijeet Bhattacharya, Udit Narayan | 06:13 |
| 4. | "My Adorable Darling" | Anu Malik, Alisha Chinai | 06:29 |
| 5. | "Hothon Pe Tera Naam" | Pankaj Udhas | 06:00 |
| 6. | "Dil Ka Darwaja" | Alka Yagnik | 06:27 |
| 7. | "Lakhon Haseen" | Kumar Sanu, Asha Bhosle | 05:37 |
| 8. | "Zubaan Khamosh Hoti Hai" | Kumar Sanu, Alka Yagnik | 08:37 |
| Total length: | | | 53:23 |

== Reception ==
It was the first Bollywood action film to be reviewed by martial arts film critic Albert Valentin on the now defunct Kung Fu Cinema site. He rated the film 3.5 out of 5 stars. He notes that, while the plot is largely borrowed from The Hard Way, Main Khiladi Tu Anari "kicks it up a notch due to the presence of one of India's biggest action stars, martial artist Akshay Kumar", comparing his martial arts skills to Jean-Claude Van Damme and praising his stuntwork, and concluding that it "is a fun action-comedy" film.

== See also ==
- Hum Dono Hain Alag Alag, a 2009 Indian TV series titled after a song in this film

== Awards ==
40th Filmfare Awards:

Nominated

- Best Supporting Actor - Saif Ali Khan
- Best Comedian - Kader Khan
- Best Music Director - Anu Malik
- Best Female Playback Singer - Alka Yagnik for "Chura Ke Dil"
