= Sambhav Jain =

Indian film actor

- Born: Delhi, India
- Occupation: Film actor
- Years active: 2018–present

Sambhav Jain is an Indian film actor who is associated with the Hindi film industry. He is best known for films and TV series including Gully Boy, Good Newwz, Setters and Rudrakaal.

== Early life ==
Jain belongs to Delhi. He was associated with Asmita Theatre Group in Delhi and he acted in various plays.

== Career ==
Jain rose to fame in 2019 with a role in Gully Boy, starring Ranveer Singh and Alia Bhatt.

In the same year, he played a medical intern in the film Good Newwz, starring Akshay Kumar, Kareen Kapoor, Diljit Dosanjh and Kiara Advani. He also acted as Ramesh Shetty in the film Setters, starring Aftab Shivdasani and Shreyas Talpade.

In 2020, he played Akash in the web series Becharey.

Jain played Mahesh in the television series Rudrakaal, starring Bhanu Uday and Dipannita Sharma, in 2021. In the same year, he played Abhishek in the tv series Rickshaw.

Jain also acted in the short film "The Icebreaker", starring Divyendu Sharma.

== Filmography ==
| Year | Work | Character | Notes |
|---|---|---|---|
| 2018 | "The Icebreaker" | Johny | |
| 2019 | Gully Boy | Bandra Boy | |
| 2019 | Good Newwz | Medical intern | |
| 2019 | Setters | Ramesh Shetty | |
| 2020 | Sweet N Sour | Kabir | |
| 2020 | Becharey | Aksh | |
| 2021 | Rickshaw | Abhishek | |
| 2021 | Rudrakaal | Mahesh | |

=== Plays ===
- Tamasha
