= Pasant Aahe Mulgi =

Pasant Aahe Mulgi (lit. 'I Like That Girl') may refer to:

- Pasant Aahe Mulgi (TV series), a 2016 Indian Marathi-language television series
- Pasant Aahe Mulgi (1956 film), an Indian Marathi-language drama film
- Pasant Aahe Mulgi (1989 film), an Indian Marathi-language drama film
