= Kuljeet Randhawa =

Indian model and actress (1976–2006)

- Born: 29 January 1976; Raniganj, Asansol, West Bengal, India
- Died: 8 February 2006 (aged 30); Mumbai, Maharashtra, India

Kuljeet Randhawa (29 January 1976 – 8 February 2006) was an Indian model and actress. She is best known for her work in TV series C.A.T.S., Special Squad and Kohinoor.

== Early life and career ==
Randhawa was born on 29 January 1976 in Raniganj, Asansol, West Bengal. Her father served in the Indian police, which enabled Kuljeet to travel across India including Patiala, Punjab where her father was serving at the time of her suicide. She began modelling as a student, and her work included several ads and runway shows for major designers. She earned her Honours in Psychology from Delhi University.

Randhawa began her career starring in Hip Hip Hurray replacing Shweta Salve as 'Prishita'. Her performance was appreciated but she came into the spotlight when she was signed as the new lead in UTV show C.A.T.S. where she again replaced an actress Karminder Kaur. The TV series, starring Nafisa Joseph and Malini Sharma, became popular but remained slow on the ratings front. Randhawa was highly appreciated for her part as detective 'Ash'. Following the end of the series, Randhawa continued to appear in many TV shows in cameos and also featured in modelling assignments.

Randhawa saw success as a model but was more selective when it came to acting. After C.A.T.S. she returned in a lead role in Star One's Special Squad.

Her performance was very well received in Special Squad but in order to increase the ratings, Gauri Pradhan Tejwani was signed as another female lead in the show. After six episodes, Randhawa quit the show citing professional reasons.

Right after she quit Special Squad, Randhawa was signed to play 'Irawati Kohli' in the Cinevistaas and Sahara One Production, 'Kohinoor'. In an exclusive chat transcript, Randhawa revealed details about the show, Special Squad, Nafisa Joseph and more about herself. The season one of Kohinoor was well received by the audience and the makers were planning another season but it didn't materialise after Randhawa’s death in 2006.

== Death ==
On 8 February 2006, Kuljeet hung herself in her apartment in Juhu, Mumbai. In a suicide note, Kuljeet stated that she was ending her life as she was unable to cope with life's pressures. Shortly before her death, she had completed filming for the movie By Chance. She died at the age of 30.

== Filmography ==
- Ghar Jamai (1997) Zee TV as Subramanium/Subbu Friend (guest Role only in episode 64)
- Ghar Ek Mandir (TV series) (2000) Sony as Anjali
- Hip Hip Hurray — Zee TV (Role — Prishita) from Episode 54 to 86.
- C.A.T.S. - Sony TV (Lead Role — Ash)
- Rishtey — Zee TV Episode 157
- Aahat as Anita (Episodic role in Season 1 Episode 258 )
- Ssshhh...Koi Hai Episodic Role in Season 1 Episode 31
- Sarhadein — Zee TV (Cameo) as Sheena from Episode 57 to 86
- Gubbare :- (Zee TV) Episode 21
- Kyun Hota Hai Pyaar — Star Plus (Cameo)
- Kehta Hai Dil — Star Plus (Cameo)
- Kumkum – Ek Pyara Sa Bandhan—Star Plus (Supporting Role)
- Kambhkht Ishq — Zee TV (Cameo)
- Special Squad — Star One (Lead Role — Shaina Singh)
- Kohinoor — Sahara One (Lead Role — Irawati Kohli)

Besides acting, Randhawa worked on a number of modelling assignments for brands like Reid and Taylor, Recova, Maggi, and Anchor Switches among others.
