= Kohinoor (TV series) =

2005 Indian television series

- Directed by: Anshuman Singh; Nikhil Thakkar
- Creative director: Sushen Bhatnagar
- Starring: see below
- Country of origin: India
- Original language: Hindi
- No. of seasons: 1
- No. of episodes: 60

Production
- Camera setup: Multi-camera
- Running time: 25 minutes
- Production company: Cinevistaas Limited

Original release
- Network: Sahara One
- Release: 5 September – 15 December 2005

Kohinoor is an Indian mystery television series that aired on Sahara One. It was loosely adapted from Dan Brown's novel The Da Vinci Code. The series, starring Kuljeet Randhawa in the lead role, premiered on 5 September 2005. The channel launched a Diwali contest named "Kohinoor Ki Diwali Heeron Waali" from 17 to 31 October, where it gave away ₹45 lakhs worth of diamonds to 300 randomly selected participants.

== Plot ==
The story is of a young NRI woman, Irawati Kohli, who lives in England and works for an art house. She comes to India in search of new things. Being raised in a foreign country, she knows very little about India.

Her life spirals out of control when she is charged with murder. The victim turns out to be her grandfather who has left behind some bizarre clues. Now, to solve the mystery of his death, Irawati meets two men: Samar, a mysterious stranger and Karan, a besotted charmer. Suddenly she realizes that the Kohinoor, a most sought-after diamond taken away by the British, could be in India. And this could also be the reason of her grandfather's death, since he knew something about the diamond. Now the question remains: Will Irawati be able to find this invaluable diamond? And who else is looking for it so desperately that they could kill for it?

== Cast ==
- Kuljeet Randhawa as Irawati Kohli
- Manish Wadhwa as Kali
- Amit Sadh as Karan Saxena
- Ankur Nayyar as Samar Khanna
- Neeru Bajwa as Seductress
- Tarun Khanna as Rakesh Mehra (Neeru's Consort and Associate)
- Murli Sharma as Abbas Bhai
- Zarina Wahab as Irawati's Mother
- Rahul Singh as Abhimanyu
- Ajinkya Dev as Shinde
- Lucky Raajput as Naariyal Paani Wala
