= Hameshaa =

- Directed by: Sanjay Gupta
- Written by: Ranbir Pushp; Kamlesh Pandey; Kader Khan (dialogues)
- Screenplay by: Sanjay Gupta, Ranbir Pushp
- Produced by: G. P. Sippy
- Starring: Saif Ali Khan; Kajol; Aditya Pancholi
- Cinematography: Kabir Lal
- Edited by: Dilip-Zafar
- Music by: Songs: Anu Malik; Background Score: Salim–Sulaiman; Sandeep Shirodkar
- Distributed by: Eros Labs
- Release date: 12 September 1997
- Running time: 138 minutes
- Country: India
- Language: Hindi

Hameshaa (English: 'Forever') is a 1997 Indian Hindi-language romantic fantasy action film and directed by Sanjay Gupta. Written by Ranbir Pushp, the film stars Aditya Pancholi, Saif Ali Khan and Kajol. Aruna Irani and Kader Khan have supporting roles in the film. The film explores reincarnation and marks Sanjay Gupta's third collaboration with Aditya Pancholi.

== Plot ==
Raja and Yash Vardhan are childhood friends, though they come from different backgrounds, Raja being middle class and Yash being wealthy. Raja meets Rani at his college and falls in love at first sight.

One day, on her way to meet Raja, Rani gets caught in a storm. Yash happens to be driving past her and gives her a ride. He, too, is instantly smitten by Rani. At the meeting point, Raja confesses his love to Rani and she brushes him off. Raja intends to kill himself by falling off a cliff. Rani stops him and realizes she loves him.

Yash sees the new couple together and is shocked. The friends later meet on the cliff. Raja tries to cheer up a depressed Yash. He holds Yash's hand and leans backwards from very cliff, to show Yash how much he loves and trusts him. Yash tells him about his love for Rani and lets go of Raja's hand. Rani witnesses the murder and tells Yash that she will reunite with Raja, and that they will return. She jumps to her death.

22 years have passed and fate brings Yash to Reshma, a folk dancer who looks exactly like Rani. Promising to fund her sick father's treatments and to support her talent, Yash brings them over to his palace. Reshma encounters the musician Raju, who looks like Raja, and remembers incidents from her past life. Raju, however, does not remember a thing.

Yash tries to bribe Raju, wanting him to leave for Mumbai. Reshma confronts Yash when she finds out that he has secretly arranged to get engaged to her without her consent. She also discovers Yash's deceit through dreams about Raja's murder. Unable to bear it and tortured by the truth, Reshma goes to Raju and shares her experience. Believing her to be mentally unstable, he brings her back to Yash. Reshma escapes once again, and this time Raju remembers everything and jumps onto a train with her, barely managing to escape Yash, who planned to marry Reshma that day. He pushes Raju's uncle in front of a train, and later also murders Reshma's father and Raju's best friend.

In a car chase that ensues, Raju, Reshma and Yash reach the same point where Raja and Rani died. After a fight, Raju finds himself once again hanging on to Yash's hand, but reverses their positions when Yash's distracted. Raju lets Yash go. Raju and Reshma finally reunite.

== Cast ==
- Aditya Pancholi as Yash Vardhan
- Saif Ali Khan in a dual role as:
  - Raja
  - Raju
- Kajol in a dual role as:
  - Rani
  - Reshma
- Laxmikant Berde as Laxmi
- Aruna Irani as Dai Maa
- Kader Khan as Raju's Chacha
- Satyen Kappu as Reshma's father
- Tej Sapru as Banwari
- Milind Gunaji as Police Inspector
- Achyut Potdar as Maxie
- Ishrat Ali as Alu Jaan

== Production ==
This movie was the last movie until Om Shanti Om (2007) movie came as the concept based on reincarnation. It was believed that Ramesh Sippy brother Vijay sippy committed suicide after the film was a box office flop.

== Soundtrack ==
Hameshaa

Soundtrack album by Anu Malik Salim–Sulaiman
- Released: June 1997 (India)
- Recorded: 1995–97
- Genre: Feature film soundtrack
- Label: Venus Records & Tapes

#	Title	Singer(s)	Notes	Length	Lyricist
1	"Hameshaa Hameshaa"	Kumar Sanu, Sadhana Sargam	Pictured on Saif and Kajol's 1st love	06:54	Rahat Indori
2	"Neela Dupatta"	Abhijeet, Sadhana Sargam	Pictured on Kajol's Family	06:26	Dev Kohli
3	"Ae Dil Hamen Itna Bata"	Udit Narayan, Sadhana Sargam	Pictured on Saif and Kajol's Break Up	06:28	Rahat Indori
4	"Aisa Milan Kal Ho Naa Ho"	Kumar Sanu, Alka Yagnik	Pictured on Saif and Kajol's last goodbye	06:28	Dev Kohli
5	"Dil Tujhpe Fida"	Kumar Sanu, Alka Yagnik	Pictured on Saif and Kajol's 2nd love	07:03	Dev Kohli
6	"Marke Bhi Laut Aayenge"	Abhijeet	Pictured on Saif's Double Body	06:36	Dev Kohli
7	"Rangtadi Rangtadi"	Alka Yagnik, Ila Arun	Pictured on Nagma (Cameo) and Tej Sapru's sleeping for 1 night	08:24	Maya Govind
8	"Beyond Eternity" (Theme From Hameshaa)	Instrumental	Music by Salim–Sulaiman	03:50	
