= Hisaab Khoon Ka =

- VCD Cover
- Directed by: Surendra Mohan
- Written by: Ranbir Pushp
- Produced by: Surendra Mohan
- Starring: Mithun Chakraborty; Mandakini; Poonam Dhillon; Satish Shah; Raj Babbar
- Music by: Nadeem-Shravan
- Release date: 21 July 1989
- Running time: 135 minutes
- Country: India
- Language: Hindi

Hisaab Khoon Ka is a 1989 Indian Hindi-language film directed by Surendra Mohan, starring Mithun Chakraborty, Satish Shah, Poonam Dhillon, and Mandakini in lead roles.

Suraj(Mithun) is a rich man, and falls in love with a poor girl called Preet. But little does he know about the mystery surrounding her mother’s murderer will haunt him after years.

== Cast ==
- Mithun Chakraborty as Suraj
- Raj Babbar as Rajesh
- Poonam Dhillon as Anu/Anita (Double Role)
- Mandakini as Preet Kaushal
- Amrish Puri as CBI Inspector Ranveer Pushp
- Bindu as Kiran
- Saeed Jaffrey as Diwan Yashpal
- Gulshan Grover as Kuldeep Kaushal
- Om Shivpuri as Dharampal
- Sushma Seth as Rajmata
- Satish Shah as Nandlal Patialewala
- Tiku Talsania as Satpal
- Pradeep Rawat as Rajkumar Shekhar of the princely state
- Rana Jung Bahadur as Inspector Ashish Singh
- Yashwant Dutt as Doctor Dharamdas
- Manik Irani as Kidnapper Billa
- Shiva as Fake Police Inspector Rana

== Music ==
The music of the film was composed Nadeem-Shravan.

Song	Singer
"Door Nahin Ja Sakti"	Lata Mangeshkar
"Door Nahin Ja Sakti" (Sad)	Lata Mangeshkar
"Hey You, Do You Love Me"	Asha Bhosle
"Shokh Baharon Ka Mausam, Rangeen Nazaron Ka Mausam"	Asha Bhosle, Mohammed Aziz
"Chand Se Aaya Hoon Dance Karne"	Vijay Benedict, Alisha Chinai
"Kasam Se Rang Mehfil Ka Main Jama Dunga, Ke Main Bhi Cheez Kya Hoon Yeh Sabko Dikha Dunga"	Shabbir Kumar, Vinod Rathod, Sarika Kapoor
