= Dekha Pyar Tumhara =

1985 film by Virendra Sharma

- Promotional poster
- Directed by: Veerendra Sharma
- Written by: Ranbir Pushp
- Story by: Mohan Kaul
- Produced by: S. P. Malhotra; Pratap Singh
- Starring: Kamal Haasan; Rati Agnihotri
- Cinematography: Barun Mukherjee
- Edited by: Waman Bhonsle; Gurudutt Shirali
- Music by: Laxmikant–Pyarelal
- Production company: Silver Screen Productions
- Release date: 20 December 1985
- Country: India
- Language: Hindi

Dekha Pyar Tumhara (transl. See, I have loved you) is a 1985 Indian Hindi-language film directed by Veerendra Sharma. The film stars Kamal Haasan and Rati Agnihotri. In 1996, the film was dubbed in Telugu and released with the title Allari Mogudu Anumanam Pellam.

== Plot ==
Anu, the beautiful lovely daughter of a wealthy businessman Kailashnath, loves Vishal and later marries him, but she is disappointed to experience that he is not a loving husband. Her friend Seema asks her to train her husband as a dog gets trained by his master. Anu reads the book and trains Vishal, ultimately making Vishal an hen-pecked husband. All goes very well as per Anu's plan for some time before Vishal finds same book and the trouble starts again, making Anu's life miserable, but they eventually make up their differences and live peacefully making each other happy.

== Cast ==
- Kamal Haasan as Vishal "Vishi"
- Rati Agnihotri as Anu
- Moushumi Chatterjee as Kiran Malik
- Deven Verma as Lalu Lalwani
- Suresh Oberoi as Inspector Ranjeet Malik
- Shakti Kapoor as himself / Ranjeet Malik
- Om Shivpuri as Kailashnath
- Iftekhar as Target's Managing Partner
- Yunus Parvez as Nadeem
- Usha Naik as Seema
- Kalpana Iyer as Rosy
- Madhu Malhotra as Julie

== Soundtrack ==
Dekha Pyar Tumhara

Soundtrack album by Laxmikant–Pyarelal
- Released: 1985
- Genre: Feature film soundtrack
- Language: Hindi
- Label: T-Series

Song	Singer
"Umar Tere Naam, Naam Kar Di" (Happy)	Lata Mangeshkar, Suresh Wadkar
"Umar Tere Naam, Naam Kar Di" (Sad)	Lata Mangeshkar, Suresh Wadkar
"Na Baba Na Baba"	Kamal Haasan
"Na Baba Na Baba"	S. P. Balasubrahmanyam
"Ek Hum Hai Jo Dinbhar Intezar Karte Hai"	S. P. Balasubrahmanyam, Asha Bhosle
"Chahe Duniya Chhute"	Asha Bhosle
"Jag Ne Sau Sau"	Anup Jalota
