= Hawalaat =

- Directed by: Surendra Mohan
- Written by: Ranbir Pushp; Ram Kelkar
- Produced by: Surendra Mohan
- Starring: Shatrughan Sinha; Mithun Chakraborty; Rishi Kapoor; Padmini Kolhapure; Mandakini; Anita Raj
- Music by: Anu Malik
- Release date: 26 June 1987
- Running time: 140 minutes
- Country: India
- Language: Hindi

Hawalaat is a 1987 Indian Hindi-language action film directed and produced by Surendra Mohan. It stars an ensemble cast of Shatrughan Sinha, Mithun Chakraborty, Rishi Kapoor, Padmini Kolhapure, Mandakini, and Anita Raj.

== Plot ==
Geeta works for a newspaper as a reporter and exposes the drug-running crimes of Dharamdas and others involved with him, as a result she is abducted, imprisoned and gang-raped repeatedly by both the criminals and a police inspector. Who will save her and others from the clutches of the criminals forms the climax.

== Cast ==
- Shatrughan Sinha as CID Inspector Sikandar Ali Khan / Gullu Badshah
- Mithun Chakraborty as Mangal Dada
- Rishi Kapoor as Shyam
- Padmini Kolhapure as Geeta
- Mandakini as Leela
- Anita Raj as CID Inspector Shamim Khan / Salma
- Gulshan Grover as Inspector Virendra Sharma
- Prem Chopra as Dr. Prem Pal
- Dalip Tahil as Shaikh Ibrahim
- Amrish Puri as Dharamdas
- Om Shivpuri as Minister Ajit
- Om Prakash as Raghu
- Sudhir Dalvi as Kailash
- Seema Deo as Parvati
- Mukri as Director Kanhaiya Nath Mehta
- Chandrakant Gokhale as Kashinath Kaushal as Newspaper Editor
- Rakesh Bedi as Constable Handa

== Music ==
Lyrics: Gulshan Bawra

| Song | Singer |
|---|---|
| "Hay Re Tera Bholapan" | Asha Bhosle |
| "Wahi To Ho Ludhiyane Mein Aage Phir Jo Ho" | Asha Bhosle, Kishore Kumar |
| "Tere Husn Ka Charcha Ab To Hone Laga Hai" | Asha Bhosle, Mohammed Aziz |
| "Tere Pyar Pe Bharosa" | Lata Mangeshkar |
| "Shayad Tu Mujhse" | Shailendra Singh |
