= Hriday Lani =

Indian script and dialogues writer

- Born: Hriday Lani Asthana; Sandila, Uttar Pradesh
- Died: Mumbai, Maharashtra
- Occupations: Script and Dialogues writer
- Spouse: Meetam Asthana
- Children: Alakh Asthana, Akshara Pabla

Hriday Lani was a noted Indian script and dialogues writer. He is the winner of Filmfare Award for Best Dialogue for the 1999 film Sarfarosh along with Pathik Vats.

== Career ==
Lani has written script and dialogues for various Hindi films. He has written scripts/dialogues for commercially successful films like Shalimar (1978), Agni Sakshi (1996), Yeshwant (1997), Yugpurush (1998), Sarfarosh (1999). He has also written for parallel cinemas like Gaman (1978), Mirch Masala (1987), Salim Langde Pe Mat Ro (1989) and Salaam Bombay! (1988).

He shared the Filmfare Award for Best Dialogue with Pathik Vats for his work in Sarfarosh (1999) at the 45th Filmfare Awards.

He is a visiting faculty at the Institute of Moving Images, Pune.
