= C.A.T.S. (TV series) =

- Genre: Thriller
- Written by: Ranbir Pushp
- Country of origin: India
- Original language: Hindi
- No. of seasons: 1
- No. of episodes: 32

Original release
- Network: Sony Entertainment Television

C.A.T.S. is an Indian television series that aired on Sony Entertainment Television in 2000–2001. The series was inspired by the American television series Charlie's Angels. The main cast features Nafisa Joseph, Kuljeet Randhawa, Malini Sharma and Karminder Kaur. The show was produced by UTV.

== Plot ==
C.A.T.S. like its American counterpart, features three women who work as detectives for a mysterious figure named 'Charlie'. C.A.T.S. stands for Careena, Amrita/Ash and Tanya. The girls are assisted by Charlie's close associate and spy 'Bhonsle'. Charlie is a multi-millionaire who assigns C.A.T.S. a new case every week of the show.

== Cast ==
- Nafisa Joseph as Careena
- Malini Sharma as Tanya
- Karminder Kaur as Amrita
- Kunal Vijayakar as Bhonsle
- Ninad Kamat as Voice of "Charlie"
- Kuljeet Randhawa as Ash

=== Guest appearances ===
- Aman Verma as Ajay Malhitra
- Vijay Aidsani as Anand
- Amrita Prakash as Mili
- Deepak Parashar as Surender Jagratan
- Aarav Chowdhary as Harish
- Kishori Shahane as Shraddha
- Rajeev Verma as Bharat Oberoi
- Abhay Bhargava as Indrajeet
- Vrajesh Hirjee as Ramesh
- Beena Banerjee as Asha Mathur
- Vaishnavi Mahant as Sonia
- Prithvi Zutshi as Satyaprakash
