= Specials @ 10 =

- Directed by: Lalit Marathe; Vikram Bhatt; Madhur Bhandarkar; Mukul Abhyankar; Mahesh Manjrekar
- Presented by: Anurag Kashyap
- Starring: Vaani Kapoor; Bhanu Uday; Neena Gupta
- Country of origin: India
- No. of episodes: 48

Production
- Running time: 45 minutes

Original release
- Network: Sony Entertainment Television India
- Release: 2 March – 21 May 2009

Specials @ 10 is an Indian television series on Sony Entertainment Television which features four different stories produced by four Bollywood film directors. The stories include Rajuben, presented by Anurag Kashyap and directed by Lalit Marathe; Shaurat Nafrat Aur Showbiz, by Vikram Bhatt; Har Kadam Par Shaque, written and directed by Mukul Abhyankar, and presented by Mahesh Manjrekar; and Heroin - Zindagi Ke Panno Se, by Madhur Bhandarkar. Heroin - Zindagi Ke Panno Se featured a new story every time, and the other three shows had a recurring story. The series aired every Monday-Thursday: Rajuben on Monday, Shaurat Nafrat Aur Showbiz on Tuesday, Har Kadam Par Shaque on Wednesday, and Heroin on Thursday. Each story aired for 12 weeks.

== Plot ==
The show aired an hour long episode of each story every week, totaling four episodes per week for 12 consecutive weeks. The stories are:

Har Kadam Par Shaque
Directed by Mukul Abhyankar. Presented by Mahesh Manjrekar.

A small town, Kasauni, is located in deep mountains where secrets are so dark that they are best kept hidden. The murder of a young woman, Mallika, sets things off as secrets are revealed one by one. More people are murdered and top homicide detective Ashutosh Mehra comes to investigate. He and Mallika's sister Anjali start their own investigation and they realize the web of lies is more twisted than they imagined.

Starring Priya Bapat, Bhanu Uday, and Nidhi Seth.

Shaurat Nafrat Aur Showbiz
Directed by Vikram Bhatt.

This tale showcases the dark reality behind the glittering world of Bollywood.

Rajuben
Directed by Lalit Marathe. Presented by Anurag Kashyap.

This is the story of Lady Don Rajuben (Shilpa Shukla) and the events that lead her to become a criminal mastermind.

Heroin - Zindagi Ke Panno Se
Directed by Madhur Bhandarkar.

This series showed different episode every episode. Each featured different women in different situations - a housewife, an actress, and a mother, each having same concept of how these women were the true "heroine" in life.

Starring Neena Gupta.
