= Special Squad (Indian TV series) =

Crime drama thriller television series

- The title logo of the series
- Genre: Crime drama Thriller
- Written by: Bijesh Jayarajan
- Directed by: Nand Kumar Kale; Satyam Tripathy
- Starring: Bhanu Uday; Kuljeet Randhawa; Paritosi Sand; Gauri Pradhan Tejwani; Manava Naik; Iqbal Azad; Pankit Thakker; Vineet Sabharwal; Raj Banerjee
- Country of origin: India
- Original language: Hindi
- No. of episodes: 52

Production
- Producers: Ronnie Screwvala; Zarina Mehta; Deven Khote
- Production location: Mumbai

Original release
- Network: STAR One
- Release: November 2004 – 2005

Special Squad is an Indian crime drama thriller television series, which premièred on STAR One in November 2004. The series was written by Bijesh Jayarajan and directed by Nand Kumar Kale and Satyam Tripathy. It was produced by Deven Khote, Zarina Mehta and Ronnie Screwvala.

The director of Special Squad, Nand Kumar Kale, later directed another detective show CID from 2006 to 2016. The show won the 'Best Thriller' Award at ITA Awards 2006 beating CID and other crime related shows.

== Overview ==
Special Squad is a fictional elite investigative arm of Mumbai Police set up by the Commissioner of Police. The modern and incorruptible team of investigators and forensic specialists is led by Assistant Commissioner of Police, Aryan Khanna (Bhanu Uday). Kuljeet Randhawa as Shaina Singh (A criminal psychologist and a forensic investigator) was the main female lead in the show. Later, (Gauri Pradhan Tejwani) as Deepika Ghosh (a Forensic Expert and acting lead of Special Squad) was introduced as another female lead.

The show mixed deduction, gritty subject matter and character-driven drama. Every episode begins with a new crime, rarely extending to 120 minutes. The series had 52 total episodes, and culminated with the death of ACP Aryan Khanna. Later the show was re-run on many other subsidiary of STAR channels.

== Cast and characters ==
A still from "Special Squad", showing Raja Pradhan and Aryan Khanna (Bhanu Uday)

- A.C.P. Aryan Khanna (Bhanu Uday) He is an Assistant Commissioner of Police and the chief of Special Squad. He is also Forensic Toxicologist. Being a forensic Toxicologist, he provided leads when there were no lead from Dr. Ved and Papaji. He is a strong yet silent type of person. He appears to be a very intelligent, brilliant and hardcore investigator and he is only the person who reads the forensic reports in detail. He hate criminals as his wife and daughter were killed by an international terrorist known as "Bomber" (Murali Sharma), but this case remains unsolved to him and he couldn't forgive himself for that one failure. His guilt takes him to solve even unsolved cases when Deepika enters the squad and tells him that they can't take new cases because of their incomplete paperwork. Aryan is later demoted from being the head and he is seen taking down the criminals all by himself. He is killed in the last episode, during a cross fire with the criminal lord Anna Kartoos.
- Shaina Singh (Kuljeet Randhawa) She is a criminal psychologist. She is an expert in interrogations and often investigates live cases with other members of the squad. She is strict on hardcore criminals and often breaks the procedures to get the information out. Her husband left her and she has an eight-year-old son. She is always edgy about whether she is doing a good job as a single mother that makes her tough outside actually. When Aryan is framed for a murder, she is temporarily made the head of Special Squad. She leaves the Squad to take care of her son, after she realizes that she cannot devote much time to her son.
- Dr. Ved Prakash (Paritosh Sand) is the head of the Forensic Department and a physician with great skills that helped solving many crucial cases when Special Squad had no leads. He has a daughter who was murdered in an early episode. He is passed over many times for the post of Special Squad head. Once, after being blackmailed by corrupt police officer Raja, he lets Aryan get arrested and steals the evidence that can prove his innocence. Later, he confesses it to the whole team and resigns. After that Dr. Deepika Ghosh is introduced as a head.
- Dr. Deepika Ghosh (Gauri Pradhan Tejwani) She joins the organization after Dr. Prakash resigns as an acting head. She is a Forensic expert. After Aryan Khanna is exonerated, she is temporarily made the head of Special Squad. She is highly professional and very strict to rules as an officer but she is soft tempered.
- Dr. Joginder "Papa Ji" Anand (Vineet Sabharwal) is a forensics analyst and helped in a great way in catching criminals. His opinion matters to Special Squad a lot. He is an alcoholic but a very soft person. After Dr. Prakash's resignation, he becomes the head of forensics department.
- Abbas "Boxer" Ali (Iqbal Azad) is another investigator of the organization. He was arrested once as a child for a petty crime, whereupon the inspector who arrested him left him on a light sentence, giving him a second chance. After that, he decided to become a cop. He, Aryan and Ajay are very good friends and often work together, often interrogating criminals in "unconventional" ways.
- Ajay Desai (Pankit Thakker) is another investigator from the organization. He is a flamboyant and witty casanova and also bends the rules once in a while. He is brave and courageous and often takes personal risks to solve crimes. His lack of discipline often angers the top brass but Aryan Khanna who admires his work indulges him and often protects him from facing the seniors for bending rules and illegal ways of investigation. In the middle of the series, he gets attracted towards Neha.
- Subrata "Shotgun" Mitra (Raj Banerjee) is a forensic pharmacist and the head of chemical lab in the organization. He believes that forensics plays a major role in solving crimes than other investigations. He had a shining career with the Scotland Yard but had to come to India because of his ailing mother. His proud attitude has to be bear borne by the whole Special Squad team because of his crucial works in solving cases. Ajay and Boxer usually pull his leg.
- Neha Nayar (Manava Naik) appears to be a computer expert for Special Squad. She left her home because of her father's oppressive and abusive behavior. She also acts as a bait in many unconventional operations of Aryan Khanna. She has other relatives too, including a nephew. She is very antsy about cases where women have been cheated or abused and a belligerent side of hers is suddenly revealed at such times. She is the expert on computer forensics and electronics. She and Ajay start living in the middle of the series and it is a perfect case of opposites attract.
- Vivek Joshi (Rishi Dogra) is young trainee cop of the squad and nephew of the CP.
- Zubin Driver is a guy who wants to get his photos on the National Geographic. He is a Parsi lad who is the photographic expert as well as the sketch artist. He is very agile and finicky. He is the butt of a lot of jokes in the Special Squad for his intrusive nature while clicking photos. Everyone thinks he takes up too much time.

== Reception ==
Special Squad for its great performances and tight narration has found a cult status over the years. The show debuted on Star One remained slightly low on viewership as its other shows at that time but it found a good amount of appreciation and the channel subsequently showed re-runs of the show. The show went to become highly popular on its sister Channel "Star Utsav". Bhanu Uday despite featured in a couple of movies and TV assignments over the years is still remembered for his portrayal of "Aryan Khanna". Kuljeet Randhawa too left a strong Impression on the viewers with her portrayal of "Shaina Singh". The show recently featured on Indiatimes as one of the best Indian crime shows ever made. Also, Scoopwhoop.com featured the show as one of the top shows out of the best 52 TV shows of all time on Indian Television.
