= Ek Tha Rusty =

Indian television series

Ek Tha Rusty is a Doordarshan show based on the stories of writer Ruskin Bond, broadcast in 1995 (season 1), 2012-2013 (season 2) and 2014-2015 (season 3).

Produced and directed by Shubhadarshini Singh, the show stars Zarul, Nadira, Pankaj Berry, Raj Zutshi, Ayub Khan, Vipul Gupta, Bhanu Uday, and Suhasini Mulay. In seasons 2 and 3, Gupta and Uday respectively played the role of grown up Rusty.

Ruskin Bond, the author of Rusty and other short stories for children, presented seasons 2 and 3 of the show and appeared in the beginning and end of each episode. The series is semi-autobiographical, as many of the stories adapted are incidents and experiences from Bond's life.

== Synopsis ==
Season 1 (aired in 1995) is about a ten-year-old boy Rusty, his life at a boarding school and his friends and family in Dehradun. This season is set in 1930s, when India was under British rule.

Season 2 shows the time when Rusty is about 30 years of age and a struggling writer. It is set in 1960s, when Rusty has returned from England, to live in Mulberry Cottage, Mussoorie. Season 2 had Vipul Gupta playing a 30 year old Rusty. It included ten of Bond's stories - Love is a sad song, Sensualist, Dead Man's Gift, Last Time I saw Delhi, Hanging at Mango, Who Killed the Rani?, Binya Passes By, From Small Beginnings and At Greens Hotel, along with his novel Maharani. It was shot in Mussoorie and Dehradun.

Season 3 had Bhanu Uday playing a 35 year old Rusty. It includes Bond’s stories - Time Stops at Shamli and Shooting at Mango Top. The show was shot in Mussoorie. Bond’s granddaughter (from his adopted family in Mussoorie) Shristi, also acted in the show.

Set in 1960s, Seasons 2 and 3 of the show were shot in the beautiful woods and snowy hills, where alongside interesting stories, some of beautiful tracks are also featured; including "Hawaon ki dhun and Zindagi keraye ka ghar hai".

== Cast ==
- Zarul as Rusty (season 1)
  - Vipul Gupta as 30-year-old Rusty (season 2)
  - Bhanu Uday as 35-year-old Rusty (season 3)
- Raj Zutshi
- Ayub Khan
- Suhasini Mulay
