= Honeymoon (1992 film) =

- Directed by: Surendra Mohan
- Written by: Ranbir Pushp
- Screenplay by: D.R. Kaushal
- Produced by: Surendra Mohan
- Starring: Rishi Kapoor; Ashwini Bhave; Varsha Usgaonkar
- Music by: Anand–Milind
- Release date: 10 July 1992
- Running time: 160 minutes
- Country: India
- Language: Hindi

Honeymoon is a 1992 Hindi-language Romance film written by Ranbir Pushp and Kader Khan, produced and directed by Surendra Mohan. The film was the remake of the 1988 Marathi film Kiss Bai Kiss. The film received mixed reviews.

== Cast ==
- Rishi Kapoor as Suraj Verma
- Ashwini Bhave as Lata
- Varsha Usgaonkar as Asha S. Verma
- Mohnish Bahl as Vijay
- Kader Khan as Dhaniram
- Bindu as Mrs. Dhaniram
- Dinesh Hingoo as Servant
- Shakti Kapoor as Dr. Nainsukh
- Girija Shankar as Kuldeep Kaushal

== Music ==
All songs from the film were composed by Anand–Milind.

1. "Yun Na Dekho Tasveer" - Suresh Wadkar, Anuradha Paudwal
2. "Tu Neendon Ki Rani Aur" - Udit Narayan, Anuradha Paudwal
3. "Ghanti Bajaye Gulfam" - Sudesh Bhosale, Sapna Mukherjee
4. "Suniye Janaab" - Abhijeet Bhattacharya, Sadhana Sargam
5. "Shaadi Ki Hai Humko" - Abhijeet Bhattacharya, Sadhana Sargam
6. "Main Aurat Tu Aadmi" - Mohammed Aziz, Kavita Krishnamurthy
7. "Aadha Tera Dil" - Amit Kumar, Anuradha Paudwal
