= Ninad Vaidya =

Indian Film Producer

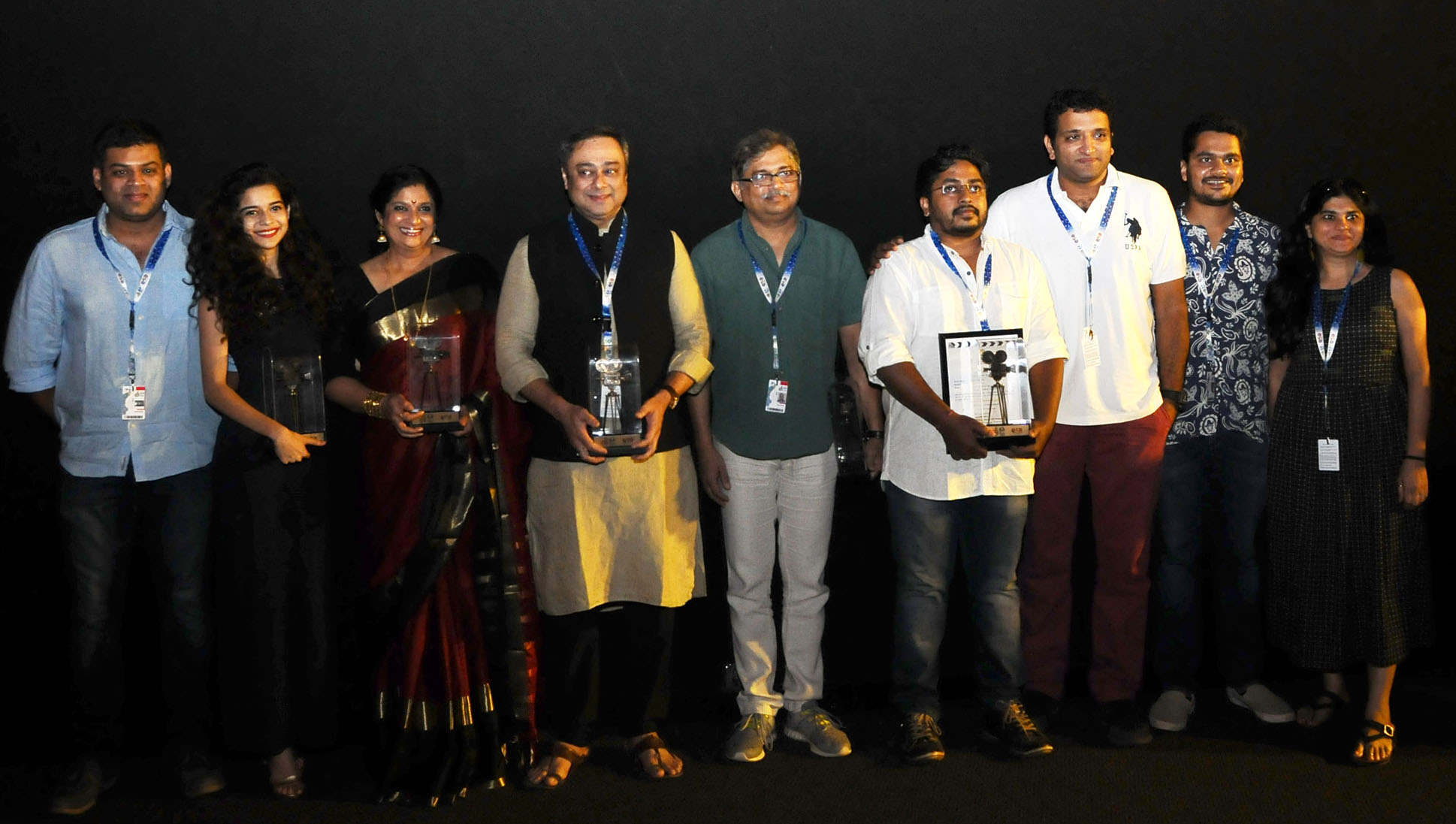
- Ninad Vaidya, IFFI (2017)
- Born: 3 September 1981 (age 44)
- Education: BSC in mathematics
- Occupation: Producer
- Known for: Muramba, Ghantaa
- Spouse: Gargi Bhagwat

Ninad Vaidya (born 3 September 1981) is an Indian film/television producer. Ninad Vaidya is a partner in Dashami Creations LLP, which creates television content, and of Dashami Studioz LLP, which produces films and digital Content.

== Early life ==
Ninad started his career post his graduation from BSC in Mathematics. Initially, he was working as an Associate Producer and Executive producer till the year 2004. Later in 2005, he joined Chrome Pictures Pvt. Ltd. as a Producer. He worked in Chrome pictures for five years till 2010. In his tenure of Five years in Chrome Pictures, and produced several Commercials and Advertising campaigns. In October 2012, Vaidya started Dashami Creations LLP.

== Career ==
Ninad worked as associate producer / executive producer until 2004. In 2005 he joined Chrome Pictures Pvt. Ltd. as a producer. He worked at Chrome pictures until 2010. While there he produced several commercials/advertising campaigns.

=== Dashami Studioz LLP ===
The first feature film that Vaidya co-produced was Ghantaa, by Shailesh Shankar Kale, starring Amey Wagh, Aroh Welankar, Saksham Kulkarni, Anuja Sathe, Pushkar Shrotri, and Kishor Kadam. It was released on 14 October 2016.

Muramba was released on June 2, 2017. It was directed by Varun Narvekar and starred Mithila Palkar and Amey Wagh. It was screened in the Panorama section of International Film Festival of India (IFFI) in 2017. Muramba won 6 awards at Jio Filmfare Marathi for Best Actor in a Leading Role (Male) to Amey Wagh, Best Actor in a Supporting Role (Female) to Chinmayee Sumeet, Best Debut( Female) to Mithila Palkar, Best Dialogues to Varun Narvekar, Best Playback Singer (Female) to Anuradha Kuber and Best Debut Director to Varun Narvekar. It won 2nd Best Film award in the Maharashtra State Film Awards 2017, and Zee Gaurav Puraskar 2018 for Best Film, Best Music, Best Playback Singer (Male) Best Story and Best Screenplay.

=== Dashami Creations LLP ===
The lists of TV shows produced by Dashami and Ninad Vaidya.

Year	Shows	Language	Notes	Channel
2013	Durva	Marathi	Political thriller about an innocent girl who for political gains is married into a conservative power-hungry family.	Star Pravah
2014	Majhe Man Tujhe Jhale	Marathi	An awkward love story after marriage with her husband Shekhar who happens to be her college maths professor.	Colors Marathi
2014	Be Dune Daha	Marathi	Follows the roller-coaster marriage of two single parents Vibhawari and Swanand, who marry for their kids.	Star Pravah
2014	Kamla	Marathi	Based on a true story and a play by playwright Vijay Tendulkar.	ETV Marathi
2016	Pasant Aahe Mulgi	Marathi	Outgoing Urmi and mischievous but sweet Vasu fall in love, but face family conflicts.	Zee Marathi
2018	Chhoti Malkin	Marathi	A courageous girl stands against her strict father who is a proud village head.	Star Pravah
2018	Garja Maharashtra	Marathi	Profiles 26 Maharashtra personalities who contributed in building the nation and led reforms.	Sony Marathi
2019	Dr. Babasaheb Ambedkar	Marathi	The show based on the life and works of B. R. Ambedkar.	Star Pravah
2015	Total Nadaniyaan	Hindi	The head of the Verma family is Tarawanti who lives with her two sons and their wives. They go through a range of hilarious situations which add unanticipated twists and turns to their lives.	Big Magic
2017	Dil Dhoondta Hai	Hindi	A Maharashtrian boy and a Punjabi girl fall in love and get married. They come to Mumbai and dream of purchasing a big home for their family.	Zee TV
2018	Namune	Hindi	Popular characters by Marathi writer Purushottam Laxman Deshpande.	Sony Sab
2017–2023	Mere Sai – Shraddha Aur Saburi	Hindi	Based on the life and times of Sai Baba of Shirdi.	Sony Entertainment Television
2021	Rudrakaal	Hindi	Suspended IPS officer Ranjan, aka Cheetah, is on a mission to find his mentor's killer. Juggling his personal and professional demons, he is in for a surprise.	Star Plus
2021	Jai Bhavani Jai Shivaji	Marathi	A tale of Chhatrapati Shivaji Maharaj and his Swarajya.	Star Pravah
2021-2023	Punyashlok Ahilyabai	Hindi	Ahilya Bai blossoms under the guidance of her father-in-law, Malhar Rao Holkar. She takes on the reign of the Malwa territory after the death of her husband and son and leads her kingdom efficiently.	Sony TV
2022	Brij Ke Gopal	Hindi	Lord Krishna hears the prayers of his greatest devotee and comes to Earth disguised as an ordinary human to restore people's faith in good.	Dangal
2022–2023	Saavi Ki Savaari	Hindi	Saavi, a happy-go-lucky girl from Ujjain, is the only breadwinner of her family and she supports them by riding a rickshaw. Her ambition is to complete her education.	Colors TV

The lists of movies produced by Dashami and Ninad Vaidya.

Year	Title	Language	Description
2016	Ghantaa	Marathi	Three best friends, Angad, Raj and Umesh, set out on a journey to shape their career and take the chance to accept every challenge that life throws at them.
2017	Muramba	Marathi	Alok and Indu, who have been in a relationship for three years, decide to part ways. However, things take a turn when Alok's parents come to know that they have broken up.
2022	BhauBali	Marathi	After a small quarrel between a Hight society resident and a poor milkman, the two classes they represent clash with each other. A satirical story of today's society about intolerance.
2023	Akelli	Hindi	A middle class girl Jyoti. Who deals with financial issues. The story shows how Jyoti tackle those obstacles.
