= Ranbir Pushp =

Indian screenwriter, film director and producer

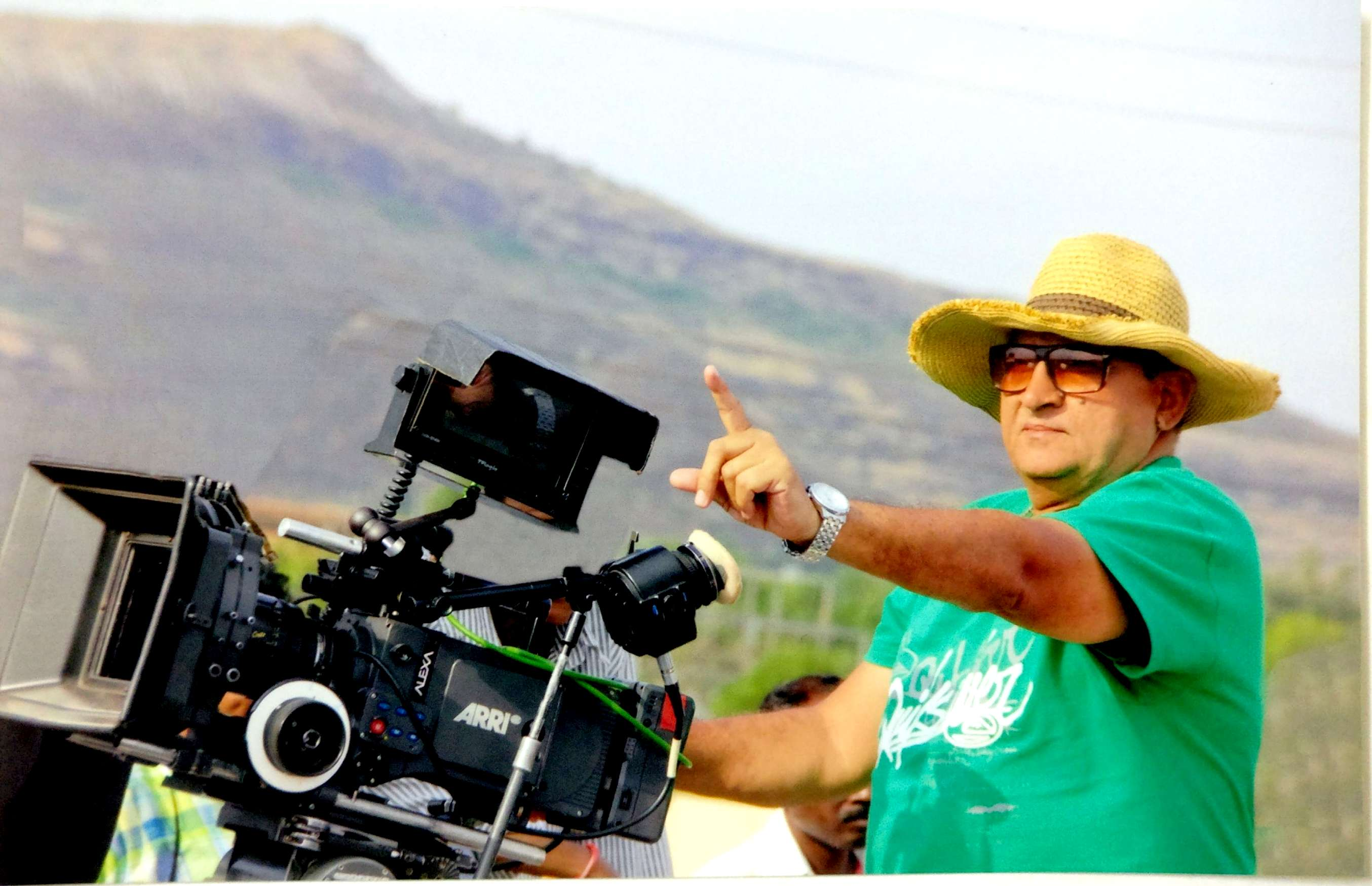
- Pushp filming in 2017
- Born: Ranbir Kumar Kaushal; Patiala, Punjab, India
- Occupations: Film writer, director, novelist
- Notable work: Agni Sakshi; Jaan; Hameshaa; Yaarana
- Spouse: Rachana Kaushal
- Children: Mahima Kaushal; Kriti Kaushal; Manbir Kaushal

Ranbir Pushp is an Indian film writer and novelist in the Indian film fraternity, Bollywood, nominated for the Filmfare Award for Best Screenplay and Filmfare Award for Best Story for the film Agni Sakshi. Frequent cast in his films include Ajay Devgan, Kajol, Saif Ali Khan, Sanjay Dutt and Nana Patekar. He is known for his films such as Jaan, Hameshaa, Agni Sakshi, and Yaarana. His film Agni Sakshi received seven nominations at Filmfare. He gained national fame due to success of Agni Sakshi, which later won a National Award. Pushp has worked for over 50 feature films and six television serials.

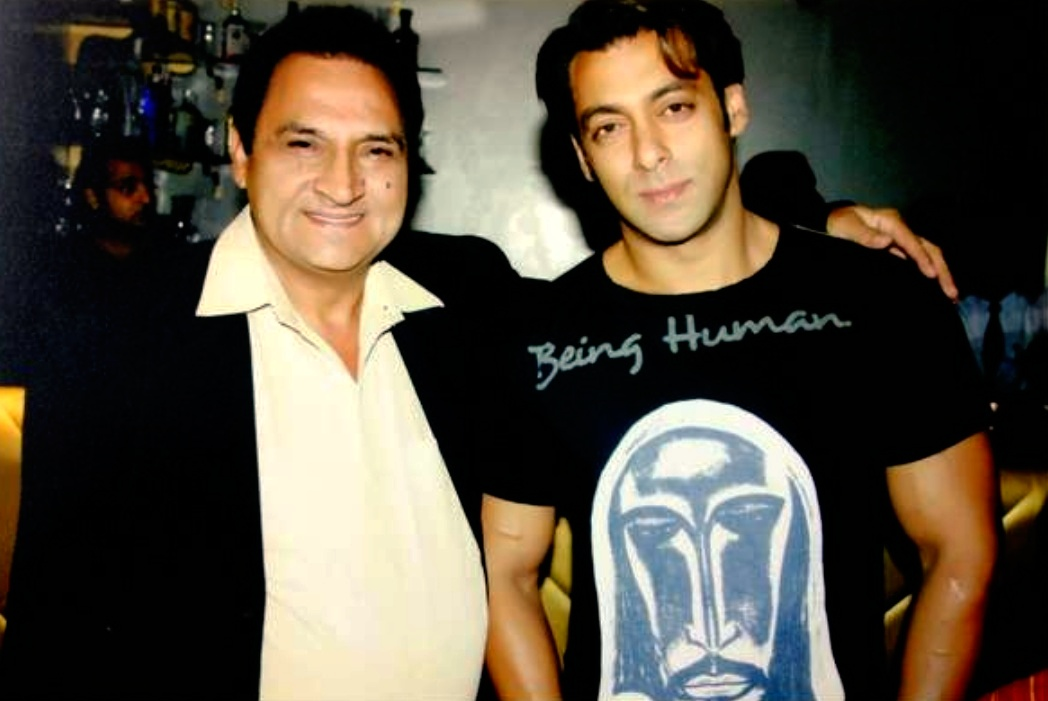
Ranbir Pushp at a film's music launch with actor Salman Khan in 2016

His debut film as a director was Yaarana with Kashish Singh and Geeta Zaildar. The film revolved around the sport of football and was rated 5 stars by Jag Bani. Pushp's next work will be a sequel to Agni Sakshi.

== Early life ==
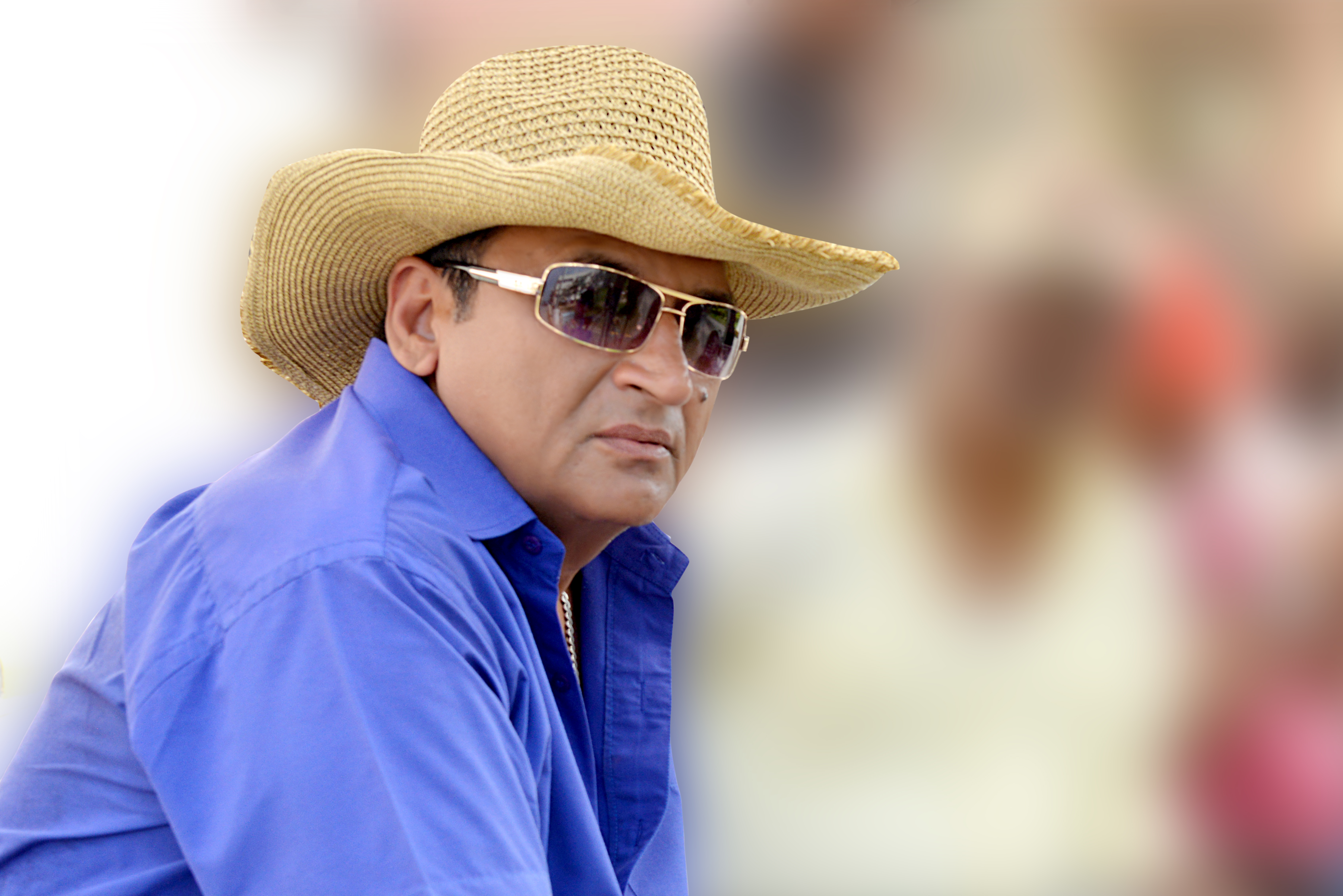
Ranbir Pushp captured at a shoot

Pushp was born as Ranbir Kumar Kaushal to Mr. Kanshi Ram Kaushal in Patiala, India. He adopted the pen name Ranbir Pushp for social reasons. Pushp did his schooling from Arya school started writing short stories for All India Radio during school days, which he was very successful at. He completed his education from Govt. Mohindra College, Patiala. During college he worked as a writer and actor for All India Radio and Television.

== Career ==
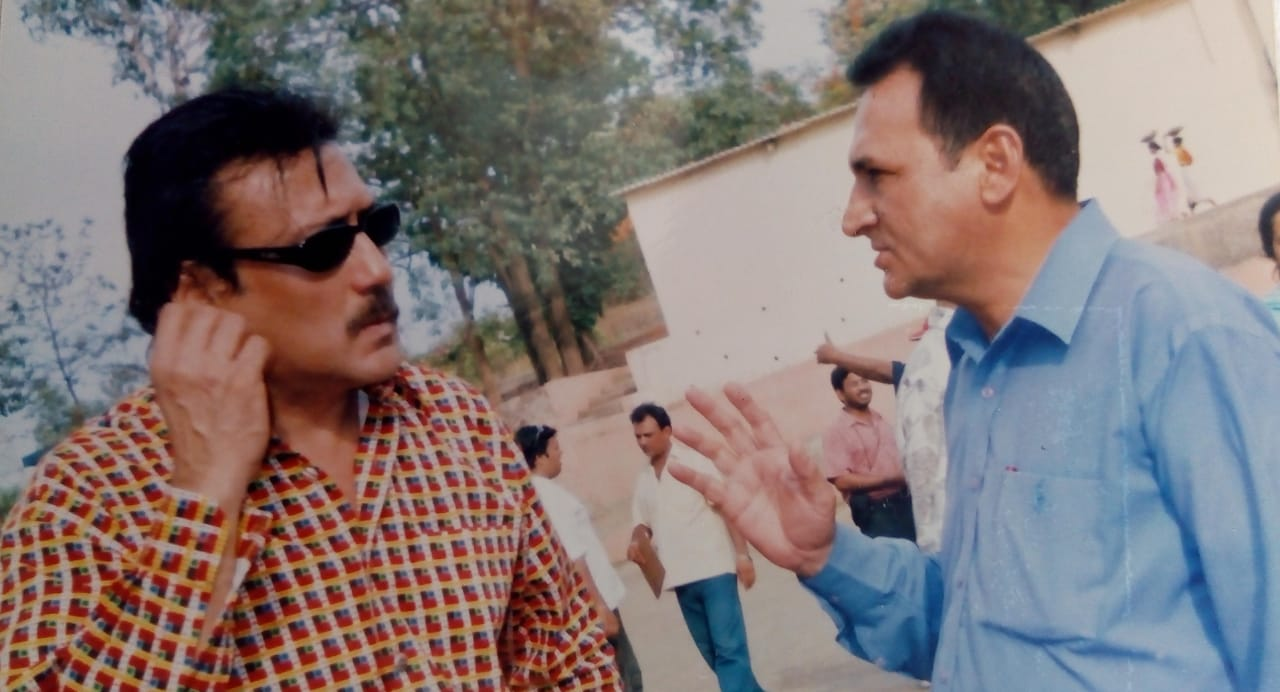
Ranbir Pushp and Jackie Shroff during a script narration

Pushp's first film as a writer was Film Hi Film in which actor Amitabh Bachchan performed as guest appearance. He later wrote a television serial, Paying Guest for Rajshri Productions and films like Dekha Pyar Tumhara, starring Kamal Haasan, and multi-star films such as Hawalaat starring Mithun Chakraborty, Rishi Kapoor and Shatrughan Sinha, and Hisaab Khoon Ka starring Mithun Chakraborty, Poonam Dhillon and Raj Babbar.

In the 1990s Pushp worked on more than 21 films as a writer hits like Sahebzaade starring Sanjay Dutt, Agni Sakshi (1996 film) with Nana Patekar, nominated for the Best Film for National Film Awards and Filmfare Award for Best Film, Hameshaa starring Saif Ali Khan, Return of Jewel Thief with Dev Anand and Jaan a silver jubilee hit starring Ajay Devgan being the top highlights.

He worked as a member of script approval committee Rajaya Film Vikas Parishad with Chairperson Jaya Bachchan for Ministry of Information and Public Relation, Govt. of Uttar Pradesh-(2003-2006). He went on to write films like Surya and Jimmy (2008 film), the debut film of Mahaakshay Chakraborty. Pushp entered the world of direction with the film Yaarana in 2015, the film was rated 5 stars by Jagbani. His next film as a writer will be the sequel to the hit film Agni Sakshi.

== Awards ==
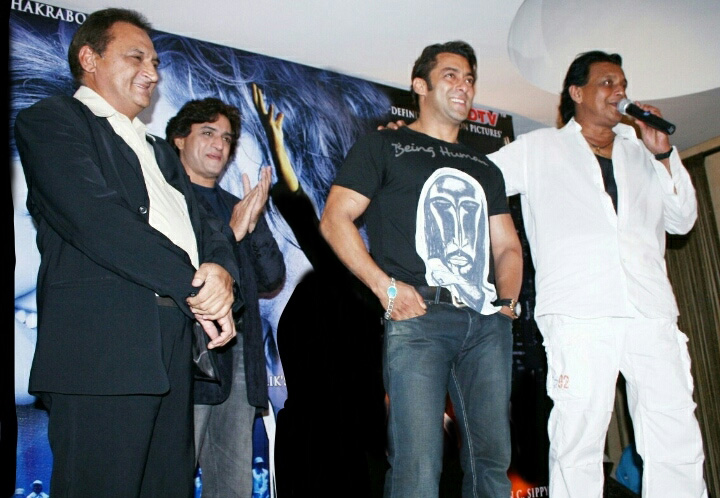
Ranbir Pushp, Anand Raaj Anand, Salman Khan and Mithun Chakraborty at an award function.

Filmfare Awards

- 1997: Nominations: Filmfare Award for Best Screenplay: Agni Sakshi, Filmfare Award for Best Story: Agni Sakshi

== Filmography ==
Year	Film	Contribution	Role
1983	Film Hi Film	Screenplay	Writer
1984	Divorce	Screenplay	Writer
1985	Paying Guest	Dialogues	Writer
1985	Dekha Pyar Tumhara	Screenplay, Story	Writer
1986	Gunhegar	Screenplay	Writer
1987	Hawalaat	Story	Writer
1988	Chamatkar TV series	Screenplay	Writer
1989	Paanch Fauladi	Screenplay, Dialogue	Writer
1990	Lal Dupatta Malmal Ka	Screenplay	Writer
1991	Hisaab Khoon Ka	Story, Dialogue	Writer
1992	Jeena Teri Gali Mein	Screenplay	Writer
1992	Sahebzaade	Screenplay, Dialogue	Writer
1992	Deewana	Story	Writer
1992	Honeymoon	Screenplay, Story	Writer
1993	Geet	Screenplay	Writer
1993	Izzat Ki Roti	Screenplay	Writer
1993	Kohra	Screenplay	Writer
1994	Ghar Aaya Mera Pardesi	Screenplay	Writer
1994	Kanoon	Screenplay	Writer
1994	Maha Shaktishaali	Screenplay	Writer
1994	Chandrakanta (TV series)	Dialogue	Writer
1995	Do Fantoosh	Story, Screenplay, Dialogue	Writer
1996	Aaja Sanam	Screenplay	Writer
1995	Kartavya	Screenplay	Writer
1996	Agni Sakshi	Screenplay, Story	Writer
1996	Jaan	Screenplay, Story	Writer
1996	Return of Jewel Thief	Screenplay, Dialogue	Writer
1997	Jeevan Yudh	Screenplay, Story	Writer
1997	Kaun Sachcha Kaun Jhootha	Screenplay, Story	Writer
1997	Hameshaa	Screenplay	Writer
1997	Suraj	Story, Screenplay, Dialogue	Writer
1998	Ustadon Ke Ustad	Screenplay, Story	Writer
1998	Khote Sikkey	Screenplay	Writer
2001	C.A.T.S. (TV series)	Screenplay, Dialogue	Writer
2004	Surya (2004 film)	Story, Screenplay, Dialogue	Writer
2008	Jimmy	Story, Screenplay, Dialogue	Writer
2015	Yaarana	Screenplay, Story	Writer and Director
