= Machhli Jal Ki Rani Hai =

- Directed by: Debaloy Dey
- Produced by: Rajneet Jain; Rajesh Jain; Viny Raj Modi; Sushil Agrawal; Abhinav M Jain
- Starring: Bhanu Uday; Swara Bhaskar; Murli Sharma; Reema Debnath; Sakha Kalyani; Deepraj Rana; Saurabh Dubey; Avinash Mukkanawar; Saandesh Nayak; Abhinav Jain; Hemant Pandey
- Cinematography: Mahendra Pradhan
- Edited by: Aseem Sinha
- Music by: Amit Mishra
- Production companies: Shri Wardhman Movie Ventures; Phaphamau Castle Films
- Release date: 13 June 2014
- Running time: 118 minutes
- Country: India
- Language: Hindi

Machhli Jal Ki Rani Hai (transl. Fish is the water's queen) is a 2014 Indian Hindi-language horror film directed by Debaloy Dey. The film stars Bhanu Uday, Swara Bhaskar, Murli Sharma and Reema Debnath. It released on 13 June 2014. A sequel to the movie is also on the cards.

== Plot ==
The film opens with Ugr Pratap, the spirit master, hot on the trail of an evil spirit possessing the body of a young village girl. He tracks down the spirit but is not able to subdue it, and the girl (under the spirit) plunges to her death and curses Ugr Pratap with the annihilation of his family. This horrible curse results in the brutal deaths of Ugr Pratap's innocent family, and Ugr Pratap is accused of murdering them. The well meaning psychiatrist, Dr. Bharadwaj gets the court to send Ugr Pratap to a quiet psychiatric facility rather than the gallows. Dr. Bharadwaj explains that he, too, often encounters paranormal patients who need spiritual rather than psychiatric help, and Ugr Pratap is the only person who can help them.

Ayesha and Uday are a happily married couple living in Mumbai. One evening, as they are returning from a party, they get in a car crash. The other driver is thrown from her vehicle and smashes into their windshield and is killed on the spot. Some weeks later Uday gets a new project to revive a failing factory in Jabalpur (Uday's home town). Uday is excited to meet his old childhood friends and, more important, hopes that the change of place will help Ayesha recover from the shock from the accident.

They arrive in Jabalpur to a warm welcome from Uday's friends, and Ayesha spends the next few weeks setting up the home and planning events and visits with friends. As time goes by, strange things happen at the factory: machines inexplicably move and crash and employees are crushed, and at home, the gas range and toasters seem to have a will of their own. Ayesha is also perturbed by their immediate neighbors, the hot headed Manohar and his quietly suffering wife Urmi. The servant woman suggests consulting a local baba (healer and exorcist) who quickly concludes Ayesha is being attacked by an evil spirit. The baba suggests an exorcism but before this can be performed, the spirit, now angry, impales and kills the servant woman (with a deer head bust) and the baba. Around this time Ayesha's father hears about these strange events and quickly finds Ugr Pratap and sets off for Jabalpur.

Uday dismisses all the spirit theories and consults a doctor. Uday brings Ayesha to the factory hoping it will take her mind off the events. (Ayesha leaves their child, Sunny, with Urmi.) Ayesha notices that Uday's office has an old photograph of the factory manager and staff and among them are Manohar and Urmi. It is revealed that Manohar was the factory manager some sixty years ago and is now dead! Ayesha rushes back home in horror and runs into Urmi's house. It is uninhabited and dilapidated! Ayesha finds an old newspaper clipping which explains how Manohar was caught embezzling and was dismissed and arrested. Unable to bear this great dishonor, he poisoned his wife and child and himself. As this horrific truth dawns on Ayesha the spirits of Manohar and Urmi and their daughter show themselves. The spirit of Manohar bitterly says it will never let the factory carry on. And with that the three spirits possess Ayesha completely.

Ayesha returns home and now launches her reign of terror on the other servants. Her father and Ugr Pratap arrive just as Ayesha attacks Uday himself. Ugr Pratap fights back with his spiritual kamandal. There is a long battle as the spirit flees to the river bank and repeatedly attacks Ugr Pratap. Uday finally plunges the charmed trisul (trident) into Ayesha and dispatches all the spirits to the other worlds. The film ends as Uday and Ayesha return home and find their son nearly drowned but unhurt. Ugr Pratap vows to continue fighting evil in the world.

== Cast ==
- Bhanu Uday as Uday Saxena
- Swara Bhaskar as Ayesha Saxena
- Murli Sharma as Manohar Gupta
- Reema Debnath as Urmi
- Sakha Kalyani as Mangla
- Deepraj Rana as Ugra Pratap Singh
- Saurabh Dubey as Dr, Akhilesh Trivedi
- Avinash Mukkanawar as Dr. Indraneel Mukharjee
- Saandesh B Nayak as Iliyaas Afsar
- Abhinav Jain as Inspector
- Binny Sharma as item number

== Soundtrack ==
Machhli Jal Ki Rani Hai

Soundtrack album by Amit Mishra
- Released: 23 May 2014
- Genre: Feature film soundtrack
- Length: 23:16
- Language: Hindi
- Label: Zee Music Company
External audio
- Audio Jukebox on YouTube

Tracklist
No.	Title	Lyrics	Singer(s)	Length
1.	"Machhli - Title" (Slow)	Puneet Sharma	Amit Mishra, Hricha Narayana	04:24
2.	"Bade Bhaiya Rangbaaz"	Amit Mishra	Amit Mishra	04:59
3.	"Sau Dil Bhi Hote"	Puneet Sharma	Shaan, Mahalakshmi Iyer	06:07
4.	"Saturday Night Hai"	Prashant Ingole	Neeraj Shridhar, Paroma Dasgupta	04:26
5.	"Machhli - Title" (Remix)	Puneet Sharma	Amit Mishra	03:01
Total length:				23:16

== See also ==
- List of Bollywood horror films
