= Agni Sakshi (1996 film) =

1996 film by Partho Ghosh

- Film poster
- Directed by: Partho Ghosh
- Written by: Ranbir Pushp; Hriday Lani
- Produced by: Bindumadhav Thackeray
- Starring: Jackie Shroff; Nana Patekar; Manisha Koirala
- Cinematography: K. V. Ramanna
- Edited by: A. R. Rajendran
- Music by: Nadeem-Shravan; Naresh Sharma (BGM)
- Production company: Neha Films
- Distributed by: Eros International
- Release date: 15 March 1996
- Running time: 142 minutes
- Country: India
- Language: Hindi
- Budget: ₹4.75 crore
- Box office: ₹31.34 crore

Agni Sakshi (transl. With Fire As Witness) is a 1996 Indian Hindi-language psychological thriller film directed by Partho Ghosh, written by Ranbir Pushp and Hriday Lani, starring Jackie Shroff, Nana Patekar and Manisha Koirala. The music is by Nadeem-Shravan. Nana Patekar and Manisha Koirala were widely appreciated for their performances with Patekar winning the National Film Award for Best Supporting Actor in 1997.

The film released in quick succession with Yaraana, starring Madhuri Dixit and Daraar, starring Juhi Chawla. All the three were based on the Julia Roberts-starrer l 1991 American film Sleeping with the Enemy; only Agni Sakshi proved to be successful while the other two remakes failed at the box office. After a few years, this film was remade loosely in Odia as Mu Sapanara Soudagar, starring Sabyachi, Archita and Arindam. In 1996 a Bengali film Bhoy was also made based on the same plot. Agni Sakshi was rated the first among top five "super-hit" films of 1996 by the Indian Express.

== Plot ==
Suraj Kapoor, a wealthy young man, falls in love with Shubhangi, and the two soon marry. While staying at a hotel, they are approached by a man who claims that Shubhangi is his wife, Madhu. Suraj and Shubhangi dismiss the accusation, but later the man contacts Suraj again. Introducing himself as Vishwanath, he shows Suraj a videotape of his wedding to Madhu, who looks identical to Shubhangi. Despite the evidence, Suraj refuses to believe him.

During Shubhangi’s birthday celebration, flashbacks reveal Vishwanath’s abusive treatment of Madhu, confirming that Shubhangi and Madhu are the same person. Vishwanath kidnaps Shubhangi, attempting to prove her identity by locating a mark on her body. Suraj intervenes and, in the struggle, Vishwanath falls off a cliff. Believing him dead, Suraj and Shubhangi return home.

Later, Shubhangi encounters Vishwanath while shopping. He arrives with her father, who denies that she is Madhu. Distressed, Shubhangi confesses to Suraj that Vishwanath is alive. Suraj seeks help from the police, but Vishwanath eventually surrenders on his own, insisting on speaking to Suraj. The police release him. That night, Suraj overhears Shubhangi’s phone conversation with Vishwanath, after which she admits her true identity. She reveals that as Madhu, she endured years of abuse from Vishwanath. During a trip, their vehicle plunged into a river; believing Vishwanath to have drowned, Madhu returned to her father, who advised her to begin a new life under a new identity. She moved away and became Shubhangi.

Suraj accepts Shubhangi after learning the truth and devises a plan to have Vishwanath imprisoned. He convinces Shubhangi to meet Vishwanath while pretending to be Madhu and attempt to shoot him with a gun loaded with fake cartridges. However, Vishwanath anticipates the ruse, fires back, and injures Shubhangi. In the climax, as Vishwanath is being escorted to court, he reveals that he knew the cartridges were fake. He overpowers the police, seizes a gun, confronts Shubhangi, and then shoots himself.

== Cast ==
- Jackie Shroff as Suraj Kapoor
- Nana Patekar as Vishwanath
- Manisha Koirala as Shubhangi Kapoor / Madhu
- Divya Dutta as Urmi
- Ravi Behl as Ravi Kapoor
- Alok Nath as Madhu's father
- Ashalata Wabgaonkar as Suraj's Mother
- Achyut Potdar as Commissioner of Police
- Subbiraj as Suraj's father

== Soundtrack ==
The music for the album is composed by Nadeem-Shravan lyrics are written by Sameer. The singers who lent their voices are Kumar Sanu, Kavita Krishnamurthy, Sonu Nigam, Alka Yagnik, Vinod Rathod, Alisha Chinai, Jolly Mukherjee & Babul Supriyo,. The song "O Piya O Piya" & "O Yaara Dil Lagana" were popular song. According to the Indian trade website Box Office India, with around 2,800,000 units sold the soundtrack became the third highest-selling album of the year.

#	Title	Singer(s)	Length
1.	"O Piya O Piya"	Babul Supriyo & Kavita Krishnamurthy	06:00
2.	"O Yaara Dil Lagana"	Kavita Krishnamurthy	04:34
3.	"Wada Karo Dil Se"	Jolly Mukherjee & Kavita Krishnamurthy	06:06
4.	"Mere Kaleje Se"	Sonu Nigam & Alka Yagnik	06:00
5.	"Tu Meri Gulfam Hai"	Kumar Sanu & Kavita Krishnamurthy	05:35
6.	"Mujhko Dilbar Yaar"	Vinod Rathod & Alisha Chinaoy	06:21

== Reception ==
A critic from The New Straits Times wrote that "There are some obvious holes in the storyline but don't let that distract you from the beautiful cinematography (some scenes were shot in Mauritius) and the well told story".

=== Box office ===
The film grossed ₹31 crore worldwide.
