= Gully Boy =

2019 Indian film by Zoya Akhtar

- Theatrical release poster
- Directed by: Zoya Akhtar
- Written by: Reema Kagti
- Dialogues by: Vijay Maurya
- Produced by: Farhan Akhtar; Zoya Akhtar; Ritesh Sidhwani
- Starring: Ranveer Singh; Alia Bhatt; Siddhant Chaturvedi; Vijay Varma
- Cinematography: Jay Oza
- Edited by: Nitin Baid
- Music by: Songs: See soundtrack Score: Karsh Kale; The Salvage Audio Collective
- Production companies: Excel Entertainment; Tiger Baby Films
- Distributed by: Cinestaan AA Distributors
- Release dates: 9 February 2019 (Berlinale); 14 February 2019 (India)
- Running time: 153 minutes
- Country: India
- Language: Hindi
- Budget: ₹60–70 crore
- Box office: est. ₹238.16 crore

Gully Boy is a 2019 Indian Hindi-language musical drama film directed by Zoya Akhtar, and written by Akhtar and Reema Kagti. The film was produced by Ritesh Sidhwani, Akhtar and Farhan Akhtar under the banners of Tiger Baby Films and Excel Entertainment productions, with American rapper Nas as an executive producer. It stars Ranveer Singh in the title role alongside Alia Bhatt, Kalki Koechlin, Siddhant Chaturvedi, Vijay Varma, Amruta Subhash and Vijay Raaz in supporting roles. Inspired by the lives of Indian rappers DIVINE and Naezy, the film is a coming-of-age story about aspiring street rapper Murad Ahmed (Singh), from the Dharavi slums of Mumbai.

Principal photography for Gully Boy began in January 2018 and wrapped up in April 2018. It premiered at the Berlin International Film Festival on 9 February 2019 and released on 15 February 2019 to positive reviews for the music, cinematography, Akhtar's direction, storyline, screenplay, dialogues, performances (particularly Singh, Bhatt, Chaturvedi and Varma) and the social message. With a global gross of over ₹2.38 billion (US$33.8 million), it emerged as the ninth-highest-grossing Hindi film of the year.

Gully Boy won a record 13 Filmfare Awards, the most awards for a single film in a year, including Best Film, Best Director, Best Actor (Singh) and Best Actress (Bhatt). It also became the sixth film to win all 4 major awards at the Filmfare Awards (Best Film, Best Director, Best Actor and Best Actress), after Guide (1965), Dilwale Dulhania Le Jayenge (1995), Kuch Kuch Hota Hai (1998), Devdas (2002) and Black (2005). Internationally, it won the NETPAC Award for Best Asian Film at the Bucheon International Fantastic Film Festival in South Korea. It was also selected as the Indian entry for the Best International Feature Film at the 92nd Academy Awards, but it was not nominated.

== Plot ==
Murad Ahmed, a final-year university student, lives in the Dharavi slums of Mumbai. His home life is turbulent: his abusive father, Aftab Shakir Ahmed, brings home a much younger second wife, intensifying tensions. Murad finds escape through his passion for rap music. He is also in a long-term relationship with Safeena Firdausi, a possessive medical student training as a surgeon, whom he meets secretly because of strict family restrictions.

When Aftab is injured, Murad becomes a part-time chauffeur to support the family. Witnessing Mumbai's stark socioeconomic inequality inspires him to channel his frustrations into lyrics. His musical career gains momentum after he meets Shrikant Bhosle, an underground rapper known as "MC Sher", at a college festival. Impressed by Murad's talent, MC Sher mentors him, introduces him to underground rap battles and collaborates with him on a track uploaded to YouTube.

The video goes viral, attracting Shweta "Sky" Mehta, a wealthy music producer and student at the Berklee College of Music. Sky offers to produce a track for Murad and Sher, resulting in a raw, Dharavi-shot music video that becomes widely popular online. During their collaboration, Murad and Sky become intimate and kiss. When Safeena discovers the infidelity, she attacks Sky with a broken beer bottle. Although arrested, Safeena avoids charges after Sky declines to prosecute. Troubled by her possessiveness, Murad ends their relationship.

Meanwhile, Aftab's violence towards Murad, his younger brother and their mother becomes intolerable. Murad moves his mother and brother out and begins working full-time for his maternal uncle, Ateeq Khan. When Sky later confesses her feelings for Murad, he gently rejects her, realising that he still loves Safeena. He subsequently reconciles with her.

Seeking a major breakthrough, Murad and MC Sher enter a high-profile talent contest whose winner will open for international rapper Nas at his Mumbai concert. Drawing on his experiences, Murad gives a powerful performance and reaches the final. Encouraged by his growing fanbase, he gains confidence and confronts both Aftab and Ateeq, defending his artistic ambitions against their attempts to belittle them.

After permanently reconciling with Safeena, Murad competes in the final rap battle and wins the tournament, establishing himself as one of the country's leading artists. The film ends with MC Sher, Murad's family and a proud Safeena watching as he takes the stage to deliver his triumphant opening performance.

== Cast ==
- Ranveer Singh as Murad Ahmed / "Gully Boy"
- Alia Bhatt as Safeena Firdausi, Murad's girlfriend
- Siddhant Chaturvedi as Shrikant Bhosle / "MC Sher"
- Vijay Raaz as Aftab Shakir Ahmed, Murad’s abusive father
- Vijay Varma as Moeen Arif, Murad's friend
- Amruta Subhash as Razia Ahmed, Murad’s mother
- Ikhlaque Khan as Nasir Firdausi, Safeena's father
- Sheeba Chaddha as Hamida Firdausi, Safeena's mother
- Kalki Koechlin as Shweta Mehta / "Sky"
- Ayaan Zubair Rahmani as Safeena's brother
- Rahul Piske as Chintoo
- Jyoti Subhash as Dadi
- Nakul Roshan Sahdev as Salman
- Shruti Chauhan as Maya
- Vijay Maurya as Ateeq Khan, Murad's uncle
- Srishti Shrivastava as Albina Dadarkar
- Mallika Singh as Suhani, Safeena's best friend
- Tina Bhatia as Parveen
- Rahil Gilani as Rishi
- Svar Kamble as Suhail
- Chaitnya Sharma as "MC Checkmate"
- Jasleen Royal as Juhi
- Michaela Tanwar as Gemma
- Kubbra Sait as Scarlett
- Shah Rule as himself
- Sambhav Jain as "Bandra Boy"
- Manj Musik as Rap Battle Judge
- Omi Kashyap as Driver
- Raja Kumari as Rap Battle Judge
- Bobby Friction as Rap Battle Judge
- DIVINE as himself
- Naezy as himself
- Emiway Bantai as himself
- KR$NA as himself
- Brodha V as himself
- Rohit Sangwan as Editor
- Rahul Bose as a backseat passenger (uncredited voiceover cameo)

== Production ==
Akhtar co-opted the story of two Mumbai based MCs, Naezy and DIVINE, into a musical story portraying a struggle of an aspiring rapper and his surroundings that influence his journey. Principal photography of the film began on 10 February 2018 and it was wrapped up by April 2018. American rapper Nas was an executive producer for the film.

== Soundtrack ==
The 18-song soundtrack, which was released on all streaming platforms on 12 January 2019, involves an estimated 54 contributors, including rappers from across the country, deejays, music producers and beatboxers, such as DIVINE, Naezy, Sez on the Beat, Rishi Rich, Dub Sharma, Jasleen Royal, Ace, Ishq Bector, MC Altaf, MC TodFod, 100RBH, Maharya, Noxious D, Viveick Rajagopalan, and others. As music supervisor, Ankur Tewari worked with the diverse group of artists in the studio, aiming to "bring the two worlds of hip hop and Bollywood together".

A promotional single for the film, "NY Se Mumbai", was released on 9 February 2019 and performed by DIVINE, Naezy and Ranveer Singh, along with American rapper Nas. The track was produced by XD Pro Music, a Toronto based producer duo, and Ill Wayno.

== Marketing and release ==
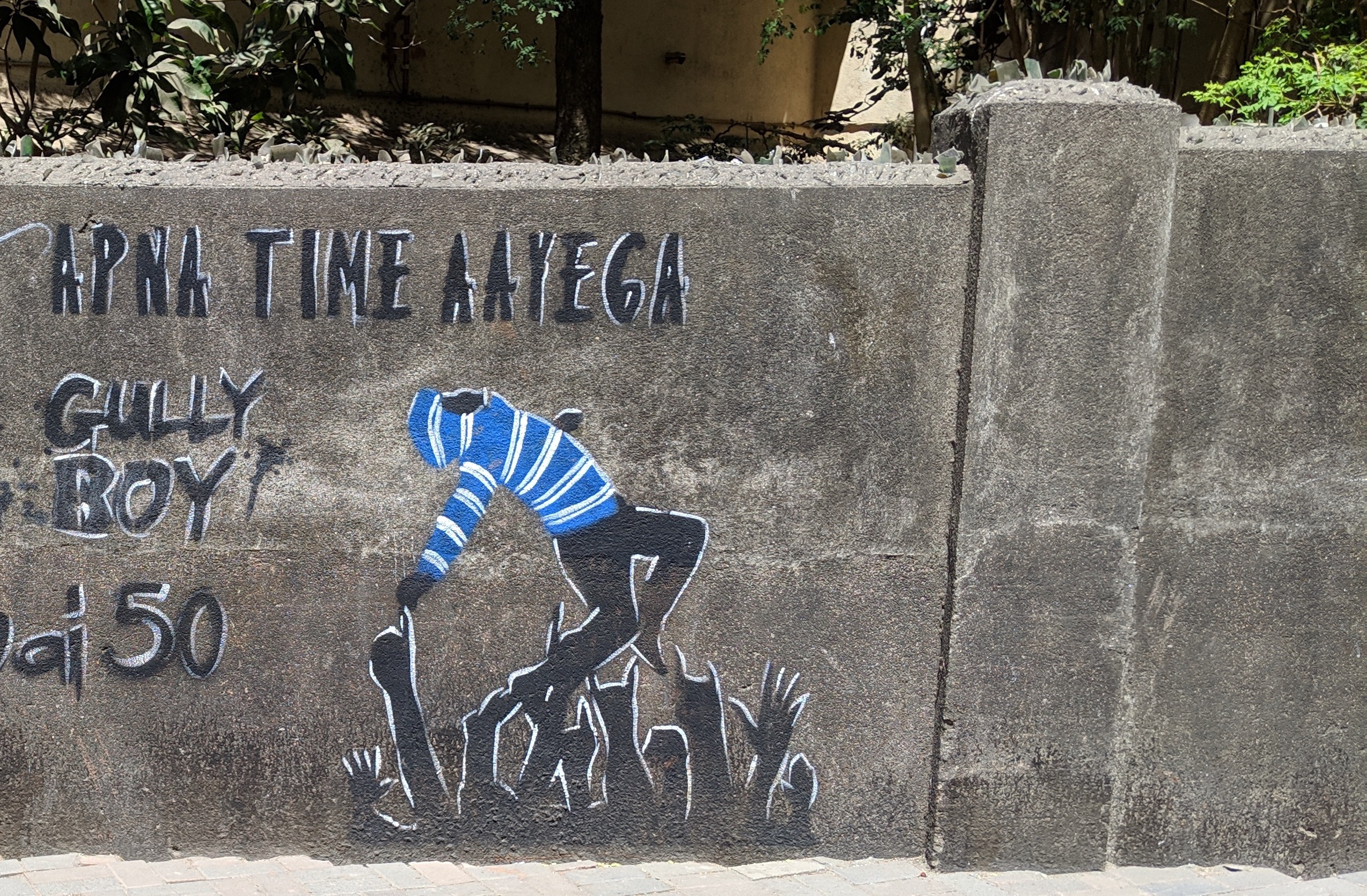
Graffiti of "Apna Time Aayega" in Mumbai

Gully Boy was confirmed to be releasing on 14 February 2019 by Alia Bhatt. The first look official poster of the film was released on 1 January 2019 and reconfirmed the release date to be 14 February 2019. Two new theatrical posters revealing looks of the lead actors of the film unveiled for the public on 2 January 2019. The film was selected in Berlinale Special section of 69th Berlin International Film Festival. The film was screened on 9 February 2019 for its world premiere at the festival. It was released in India on 14 February 2019 on 3,350 screens and in overseas markets on 751 screens, with a worldwide count of 4,101 screens.

Some writers speculated about similarities between Gully Boy and the Eminem-starring 8 Mile (2002). Writer Aditya Magal in The Quint called it, though appreciating the movie as entertaining, after outlining what he considers the many similarities, "an engineered, Indianized version of 8 Mile". Journalist Rachna Tyagi of The Week was more harsh in her review, rating it 2.5/5 and calling it "a copycat Indian version of the film." Denying the claims, director Zoya Akhtar responded "I get it (the comparison). I totally understand it, because that's the reference point and that's what they've seen so, that's the immediate reference point and people here just love to do that."

=== Home video ===
The film was made available as VOD on Amazon Prime Video on 16 April 2019.

=== Distribution ===
AA Films acquired the All India distribution rights while Cinestaan AA Distributors and Zee Studios International acquired the overseas distribution rights. Also Magic Cloud Media & Entertainment acquired New Zealand distribution rights.

== Reception ==
=== Critical response ===
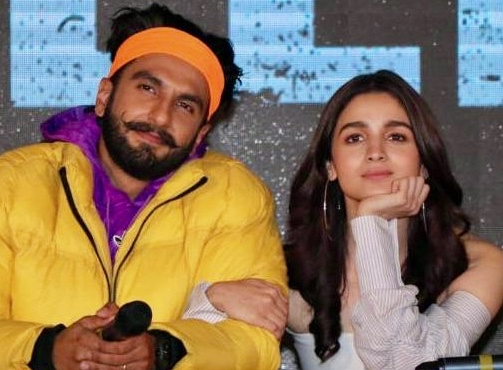
Ranveer Singh and Alia Bhatt received critical acclaim for their performances in the film.

Gully Boy received positive reviews, with praise for the storyline, direction, music, screenplay, and performances (particularly Singh, Chaturvedi, Varma and Bhatt). On the review aggregator website Rotten Tomatoes, 96% of 23 critics' reviews are positive, with an average rating of 7.3/10.

Anna M. M. Vetticad of Firstpost gave Gully Boy four stars out of five, writing, "Ranveer Singh and Alia Bhatt are devastatingly good in Zoya Akhtar's ultimate anthem for the rebel". Raja Sen of Hindustan Times gave the film 4 out of 5 stars and said, "Zoya Akhtar’s Gully Boy, an underdog story shining a light on India’s incipient hip-hop subculture, is the first great Hindi film of 2019 and a rousing celebration of spunk. The writing is enthralling, the texture fantastic, and this world is a revelation. Here are characters without room to breathe who express themselves breathlessly, through a style of music that has always belonged to the marginalised. Dissent finds a way — and a beat." Taran Adarsh of Bollywood Hungama called it "Akhtar’s best film to date". Rachit Gupta of The Times of India also gave four stars. Sukanya Verma of Rediff.com also gave four stars. Uday Bhatia of Mint wrote, "It’s a hard-won transformation – bohot hard – and it rings true". Anupama Chopra commented, "By the end, I was wiping tears and cheering furiously not just for Murad, but for each one of these characters to find happiness".

Saibal Chatterjee of NDTV opined, "Gully Boy can be whole-heartedly commended for its craft, fascinating characters and Ranveer Singh. He absolutely kills the slow-burning rapper act. What's more, he does with a lot of energy to spare." Writing for Film Companion, Baradwaj Rangan gave Gully Boy three stars out of five and found it to be "softer than expected, but hugely entertaining and beautifully made". Ananya Bhattacharya of India Today rated it three stars out of five. Mayur Sanap of Deccan Chronicle also gave it three stars. The Wire felt the film dealt with Bollywood tropes.

Manjusha Radhakrishnan of Gulf News rated the film 4/5 and wrote, "When he breaks down, you break down with him and that’s one of the biggest victories of Gully Boy". Among international reviewers, Lee Marshall of Screen International wrote, "Singh busts rhymes with the best of them in this energetic, entertaining film". Peter Bradshaw of The Guardian gave the film three stars of five. Deborah Young of The Hollywood Reporter commended Akhtar for her direction. Anita Iyer of Khaleej Times rated the film four stars out of five. Jay Weissberg of Variety wrote, "Zoya Akhtar's most accomplished film to date is a mainstream rap musical about a Muslim guy from working-class Mumbai determined to break free from the strictures of expectation and class, all served up with generous helpings of deftly written hip-hop lyrics and a largely well-woven narrative" starring "Ranveer Singh in all his charms."

=== Box office ===
Gully Boy opened with collection of ₹194 million (equivalent to ₹260 million or US$2.7 million in 2026) on its first day. In two weeks of release, the film grossed ₹220 crore (US$31.24 million). The film grossed ₹166 crore (US$23.57 million) in India and ₹72.58 crore (US$10.31 million) overseas, taking its worldwide gross to ₹238.16 crore (US$33.82 million).

== Awards and nominations ==
The film won 13 awards at the 65th Filmfare Awards, the most awards for a single film in a year, has broken the record of Black, which won 11 awards in 2006. It also became the sixth film to win all four acting awards. The film also won 12 awards at 26th Screen Awards and 9 awards in Zee Cine Awards.

Internationally, it won the NETPAC Award for Best Asian Film at the 2019 Bucheon International Fantastic Film Festival in South Korea. The film was also India's official entry to the 92nd Academy Awards for the Best International feature film category, though it was not nominated.

Gully Boy attracted controversy over its 13 wins at the 65th Filmfare Awards. Several Twitter users and fans were extremely disappointed and made calls to boycott the awards, with #BoycottFilmfare trending on the micro-blogging site. Subsequently, when the Filmfare Award for Best Lyricist went to the rap song "Apna Time Aayega" instead of the patriotic song "Teri Mitti" from the 2019 period war film Kesari, lyricist Manoj Muntashir tweeted his disappointment at the decision, pledging not to attend future award ceremonies.

== See also ==
- List of submissions to the 92nd Academy Awards for Best International Feature Film
- List of Indian submissions for the Academy Award for Best International Feature Film
