= Shalini Khanna =

Indian actress

Shalini A Khanna
- Born: 16 November 1983 (age 41)
- Occupation: Actress
- Years active: 2004 - present
- Spouse: Bhanu Uday

Shalini Khanna is an Indian actress working in TV and Bollywood industry. She debuted with the Hindi soap drama Kutumb, and is mostly known for work of Pallavi in Comedy series Sajan Re Jhoot Mat Bolo. She hails from a Punjabi background.

== Biography ==
As a part of her summer training, she worked as a copywriter on contract with an advertising firm in Mumbai. She then worked for Times Of India (Bombay Times) in the marketing department, and also worked with Zee TV as a copywriter.

While still a student, she performed theatre work in Bhopal while also working in Mumbai. During this time she realized acting gave her much more creative satisfaction and an ability to live different lives and characters.

She is married to actor Bhanu Uday.

== Filmography ==
=== Films ===
- 71/2 Phere (as Shauni Khanna) - Show writer Kavita

=== TV ===
- Kutumb -
- Kumkum – Ek Pyara Sa Bandhan as Malini (Malli)
- Babul Ka Aangann Chootey Na
- Yeh Chanda Kanoon Hai
- Sajan Re Jhoot Mat Bolo - Pallavi
- Chidiya Ghar - Saaj
- Golmaal Hai Bhai Sab Golmaal Hai - Ananoya
- Baal Veer - One of Bhayankar Pari's form
- Kareena Kareena
- Jabb Love Hua
