= Rudrakaal =

Indian 2021 drama television series

- Genre: Crime; Thriller; Drama
- Created by: Nitin Vaidya; Ninad Vaidya
- Screenplay by: Anshul Vijayvargiya; Anurag Goswami
- Story by: Vivek Apte; Anshul Vijayvargiya
- Directed by: Santosh Shetty
- Creative director: Anish N Surana
- Starring: Bhanu Uday; Dipannita Sharma
- Theme music composer: Raju Singh Panesar
- Country of origin: India
- Original language: Hindi
- No. of episodes: 10

Production
- Executive producer: Anup Poddar
- Producers: Nitin Vaidya; Ninad Vaidya
- Cinematography: Srinivas Ramaiah; Arvind Kannabiran
- Editors: Rajesh Pandey; Munna Prajapati
- Camera setup: Multi-camera
- Production company: Dashami Creations

Original release
- Network: Star Plus
- Release: 7 March – 9 May 2021

Rudrakaal is an Indian crime thriller television series which premiered on 7 March 2021 on Star Plus and Disney+ Hotstar. Produced by Dashami Creations, it stars Bhanu Uday and Dipannita Sharma. It abruptly went off-air on 10 May 2021, due to the COVID-19 curfew in Maharashtra.

== Summary ==
D.C.P. Officer, Ranjan Chittoda is on a mission to find his mentor's killer. Balancing out his personal and professional life, he is in for a shock when the killer is revealed and vows to teach him a lesson.

== Cast ==
=== Main ===
- Bhanu Uday as D.C.P. Ranjan Chittoda: Gayatri's husband; Anshuman's father
- Dipannita Sharma as Gayatri Chittoda: Ranjan's wife; Anshuman's mother
- Rudraksha Jaiswal as Anshuman Ranjan Chittoda: Gayatri and Ranjan's son
- Rajit Kapur as Baldev Singh: Ranjan's mentor and Police Commissioner, Mumbai

=== Recurring ===
- Shruti Marathe as Smita Thakur
- Kishor Kadam as Jagadish Ahire
- Bijay Anand as Malik Raza
- Monica Chaudhry as Sheena
- Pamela Singh Bhutoria as Meera Basu
- Suraj Singh
- Sandeep Shridhar Dhabale
- Swanand Kirkire as Phoolchand Mishra
- Flora Saini as Chitra Agnihotri
- Kanupriya Shankar Pandit: Baldev's wife

== Production ==
=== Development ===
The production of series began in November 2020 and the series was planned to launch in December 2020. However, its launch was delayed and it was launched in March 2021. Before its television premiere, the first episode was released a week before in Hotstar on 28 February 2021. On 13 April 2021, when the chief minister of Maharashtra announced a curfew from 15 April, the shoot of Rudrakaal halted until the government's next hearing. Soon, the show's cancellation was confirmed.

=== Casting ===
Talking about the preparations for his role, lead actor Bhanu Uday stated, "The character of DCP Ranjan Chittoda required a lot of attention to detail. It required me to visit my local police station and understand the various characteristics of a police officer. They were kind enough to guide and help me understand the minuscule details like body language, police protocol and the most important aspect the mind-set of a cop". Further he stated, "I gained 10 kg of weight for this role in a span of 15 days and underwent extreme preparation for the same". Rudhraksh Jaiswal playing Anshuman Chittoda stated, "I had to watch a couple of movies which helped me bring out the right amount of emotion. I also learnt to play the guitar by watching videos. Besides that, we (cast from the show) attended workshops."

=== Release ===
The first promo of the series was released on 19 December 2020 featuring Bhanu Uday. The series premiered on 7 March 2021 in the 7:00 pm time slot on StarPlus and offered special access to episodes, a week before airing through Hotstar VIP. It later shifted to the 6:00 pm time slot to accommodate the IPL 2021.
