= Nafisa Joseph =

Indian model and television personality

- Born: 28 March 1978; New Delhi, India
- Died: 29 July 2004 (aged 26); Mumbai, Maharashtra, India
- Education: St. Joseph's College
- Occupations: Model, TV Presenter, Actress
- Beauty pageant titleholder
- Title: Femina Miss India Universe 1997
- Major competitions: Femina Miss India 1997 (Winner); Miss Universe 1997 (Top 10)

Nafisa Joseph (28 March 1978 – 29 July 2004) was an Indian model, video jockey and beauty pageant titleholder. She was the winner of Femina Miss India Universe 1997 and was a finalist in the Miss Universe 1997 pageant in Miami Beach.

== Early life and education ==
Nafisa Joseph was born on 28 March 1978 in Delhi, and was brought up in Bangalore, Karnataka. She was the younger of two daughters born to father Nirmal Joseph, a Malayali and mother Usha Joseph, a Bengali, who was a descendant of Rabindranath Tagore.

Nafisa studied at Bishop Cotton Girls' School and St. Joseph's College, both in Bangalore.

== Career ==
Joseph started modelling at age 12 when her neighbour got her an opportunity to model for a Wearhouse ad. She was groomed as a model by Prasad Bidapa. Joseph was the youngest participant at the Miss India pageant in 1997, which she won. Joseph participated in the Miss Universe Pageant at Miami Beach, Florida on 16 May 1997, and was amongst the 10 semifinalists in the pageant.

In 1999, she was a judge for the MTV India's VJ Hunt and was also a VJ for the channel. A week later she was called for a screen test to host a show on MTV. She hosted the MTV House Full show for close to five years. She also acted in the television series C.A.T.S., an Indian adaptation of Charlie's Angels for Sony Entertainment Television. In 2004, she hosted a show Style on Star World. She also launched a television programming unit 2's Company with the help of her fiancé, Gautam Khanduja. She edited a magazine called Gurlz. She also had a brief cameo in the Subhash Ghai film Taal.

In addition to modeling and hosting duties, Joseph was a lover of animals and campaigned for Welfare of Stray Dogs (WSD), People for the Ethical Treatment of Animals (PETA) and People for Animals (PFA), organisations for animal protection, and wrote a weekly column called Nafisa for Animals in the Bangalore edition of the Times of India.

== Death ==
Joseph hanged herself in her flat in Versova on 29 July 2004. She was to marry businessman Gautam Khanduja in a few weeks' time. According to her parents, Joseph took the step because her wedding was called off. This was due to Joseph having discovered that Khanduja was still married, although having told her he had been divorced for two years. When confronted, Khanduja refused to answer questions about his marital life or produce divorce papers that he had previously claimed he had filed. Instead, press reports at the time mention that he then threatened her with blackmail, probably after she threatened to confront his wife.

Joseph's parents filed a police report accusing her fiancé of her death, claiming that Khanduja had been desperate to get out of the wedding for some time, and sought his custodial interrogation. In November 2005, the trial against Khanduja was stayed by the Bombay High Court until January 2006. Khanduja claimed that there was no evidence to prove that breaking off the engagement had led to Joseph's suicide.

== See also ==
- Suicide in India
- Jiah Khan

Preceded by Sandhya Chib	Femina Miss India Universe; 1997	Succeeded by Lymaraina D'Souza
