= Bhanu Uday =

Indian film and television actor (born 1980)

- Born: 16 October 1980 (age 45); Jammu, Jammu & Kashmir, India
- Occupation: Actor
- Known for: Aryan Khanna in Special Squad (TV series)
- Spouse: Shalini Khanna
- Children: 2
- Father: Anil Goswami
- Website: Bhanu Uday

Bhanu Uday is an Indian film and television actor, best known for his role of Aryan Khanna in STAR One's television series, Special Squad.

He played the role of Dr. Karan in Sony Pal's show Hamari Sister Didi. He was also seen as Rajaram Gaikwad in &TV's show Meri Awaaz Hi Pehchaan Hai.

== Early life and family ==
Bhanu Uday, born on 16 October 1980, was brought up in Jammu. His father is former Union Home Secretary and IAS officer Anil Goswami and his mother is a lawyer. He received his primary education from Jammu and passed his 12th standard. After that he moved to Delhi and joined Hans Raj College. Later he joined National School of Drama passing out in 2004 and started acting.

He married actress Shalini Khanna in 2014, and their son, Tathagat, was born in March 2016. Later, they had a daughter named Shambhavi.

== Career ==
Bhanu played small roles in Bollywood films like Lakshya (2004) and Dhokha (2007). He acted in the Indo-US production Unfreedom, where he played Hussain. He was seen in the 2012 horror film, Machhli Jal Ki Rani Hai.

He is best known for playing the role of Aryan Khanna, Assistant Commissioner of Police and leader of Special Squad group in Star One's Special Squad.

He also acted in the television series named Har Kadam Par Shaque (Series named Specials @ 10), aired on Sony Entertainment Channel and played an adult Rusty season 3 of Doordarshan series Ek Tha Rusty (2014 - 2015).

== Filmography ==
=== Films ===
Year	Film	Role	Notes
2004	Lakshya	Abeer Saxena	
2006	Monsoon	Govinda	
2006	Return to Rajapur		
2007	Dhokha	Rajesh	
2012	Machhli Jal Ki Rani Hai	Uday Saxena	
2014	Unfreedom	Hussain	
2018	Yaksh		
2018	Manto	Ashok Kumar	
2020	Ludo	Bhanu	
2021	Bob Biswas		

=== Television ===
Year	Series	Role	Notes
2004–2005	Special Squad	A.C.P. Aryan Khanna	
2008	Bahubali	Vijay kant	
2009	Specials @ 10	Ashutosh Shukla	Story: "Har Kadam Par Shaque"
2013	Ek Thhi Naayka	Mohsin	
2014	Encounter	Inspector Praveen waggle	
2014–2015	Hamari Sister Didi	Dr. Karan	
2015	Stories by Rabindranath Tagore	Mahendra	Story: "Chokher Bali"
2015	Stories by Rabindranath Tagore	Shashank	Story: "Two Sisters"
2014–2015	Ek Tha Rusty	Rusty	
2016	Meri Awaaz Hi Pehchaan Hai	Rajaram Gaekwad	
2017–2018	Saam Daam Dand Bhed	Vijay Namdhari	
2021	Rudrakaal	IPS Ranjan Chittoda	

=== Web Series ===
Year	Series	Role	Notes
2022	Crash Course	Shashank Batra	

=== Short films ===
Year	Series	Role	Notes
2023	Single Bed	Abhay	
2024	Nominee	Kabir	
