= Pasant Aahe Mulgi (TV series) =

Indian Marathi-language TV show

- Genre: Family drama Romance
- Written by: Sameer Vidwans
- Screenplay by: Shardul Saraf
- Directed by: Raju Sawant
- Starring: See below
- Voices of: Savani Ravindra; Rohit Raut
- Composer: Milind Joshi
- Country of origin: India
- Original language: Marathi
- No. of episodes: 187

Production
- Producers: Nitin Vaidya; Ninad Vaidya
- Editor: Amey Godkar
- Camera setup: Multi-camera
- Running time: 22 minutes
- Production company: Dashami Creations

Original release
- Network: Zee Marathi
- Release: 25 January – 20 August 2016

Pasant Aahe Mulgi (transl. The girl is chosen) is an Indian Marathi language TV series which aired on Zee Marathi. It starred Abhishek Deshmukh and Resham Prashant in lead roles. It is produced by Nitin and Ninad Vaidya umder the banner of Dashami Creations. The series premiered from 25 January 2016 by replacing Honar Soon Mi Hya Gharchi.

== Summary ==
It is about the out-going Urmi and mischievous but sweet, Vasu. It showed how a match made in heaven will face turmoil on earth when their families come face to face. Vasu’s father has strong religious beliefs, whereas Urmi’s family is a typical middle class family with contemporary thoughts.

== Plot ==
Punarvasu "Vasu" Pant-Sachiv is the youngest son of Jagannathrao "Dada" Pant-Sachiv, an influential man in Devsakhri village. Dada has a deep conviction in religion and tradition; and while Vasu respects his father, he disagrees with Dada's stringency on certain traditions- such as fixing marriages on the sole basis of horoscopes, forcing Vasu's sister, Aditi, into a marriage at the expense of her education and so on. Vasu is pursuing his masters in Sanskrit in Pune, where he falls in love with the confident and intelligent Urmi Kulkarni, who hails from a family with modern beliefs.

Vasu overcomes his shyness and befriends Urmi, eventually getting her to date him. However, Vasu is unable to confess the truth about his highly traditional background. Eventually, Vasu writes a letter to Urmi, explaining the truth, but the letter is misplaced. Urmi discovers the truth about Vasu's background and breaks up with him, believing that he deceived her. Although she later discovers Vasu's letter which proves that he did intend to tell her the truth, the relationship remains estranged and uneasy. Matters become complicated when Dada fixes his marriage with Nandini without considering his choice. Vasu's elder sister, Aditi, strongly advises him to defy their father's decision. Eventually, Urmi and Vasu have an argument where Vasu clearly communicates his feelings for her and what he truly wanted from their relationship. He also tells her that they should forget each other and move on, advising her to pursue her ambitions. Moved by Vasu's convictions, Urmi agrees to marry him despite his traditional upbringing.

After a thorough background check, Urmi's family reluctantly permits the young couple to marry in a civil ceremony. Vasu and Urmi arrive at the village on the day of the former's supposed engagement ceremony with Nandini. Dada is enraged at this act of defiance and disowns him at once. However, for the sake of Vasu's mother, the young couple stay at the house. Nandini attempts to scheme against Vasu and Urmi many times, but fails. Eventually, the couple discover that Vasu's elder brother, Ramchandra, is not happy with his wife, Kumud. Worse, it is revealed that Aditi is trapped in a miserable marriage where her husband is living with his girlfriend. Pant-Sachiv is devastated by the truth and blames himself for ruining his children's lives. He also believes that Vasu did the right thing by marrying Urmi and not Nandini.

Towards the end, Ram reconciles with Kumud, who is expecting his child. He is also appointed as the next head of the Math (Religious centre). Aditi obtains a divorce and is permitted to pursue further studies. Vasu becomes a college lecturer and Urmi is set to begin her degree in teaching. Nandini chooses to marry a teacher named Sunil. The story ends with Vasu and Urmi's fathers meeting each other for the first time and respecting one other despite their difference in beliefs.

== Cast ==
=== Main ===
- Resham Prashant as Urmi
- Abhishek Deshmukh as Punarvasu (Vasu)

=== Recurring ===
- Girish Oak as Punarvasu's father (Pant)
- Sanjay Mone as Krishnakant Kulkarni
- Vijay Mishra as Urmi's father
- Meghana Vaidya as Mai, Pant's wife, Punarvasu's mother
- Padmanabh Bind as Ramakant, Punarvasu's elder brother
- Ketaki Saraf as Nandini, Punarvasu's stepsister
- Namrata Kadam as Kumud, Ramakant's wife
- Rama Joshi as Urmi's grandmother
- Siddhirupa Karmarkar as Urmi's mother

== Reception ==
=== Special episode ===
1 hour

- 14 February 2016
- 27 June 2016
- 17 July 2016

2 hours

- 17 April 2021 (Urmi-Vasu's marriage)

=== Ratings ===
Week	Year	BARC Viewership		Ref.
Week	Year	TRP	Rank	Ref.
Week 22	2016	1.5	3	
Week 23	2016	1.7	2	
Week 24	2016	1.8	3	
Week 28	2016	1.7	3	
Week 29	2016	1.7	4	
Week 34	2016	2.6	1	
