= List of Hindi films of 1991 =

The films produced by the Bollywood film industry based in Mumbai in 1991.

== Top-grossing films ==
The highest grossing hindi films in 1991 by worldwide box office gross revenue :

No.	Title	Cast
1.	Saajan	Sanjay Dutt, Madhuri Dixit, Salman Khan
2.	Hum	Amitabh Bachchan, Rajnikanth, Govinda, Kimi Katkar, Danny Denzongpa, Kader Khan, Anupam Kher
3.	Saudagar	Dilip Kumar, Raaj Kumar, Manisha Koirala, Vivek Mushran, Amrish Puri
4.	Sadak	Sanjay Dutt, Pooja Bhatt, Deepak Tijori, Sadashiv Amrapurkar
5.	Phool Aur Kaante	Ajay Devgan, Madhoo, Amrish Puri
6	Dil Hai Ke Manta Nahin	Aamir Khan, Pooja Bhatt, Anupam Kher
7	Yodha	Sunny Deol, Sanjay Dutt, Sangeeta Bijlani, Paresh Rawal
8	Henna	Rishi Kapoor, Zeba Bhakhtiar, Ashwini Bhave
9.	Sanam Bewafa	Salman Khan, Chandni, Pran, Danny Denzongpa
10.	Narsimha	Sunny Deol, Dimple Kapadia, Urmila Matondkar, Om Puri
11.	Saathi	Aditya Pancholi, Mohsin Khan, Varsha Usgaonkar
12	100 Days	Jackie Shroff, Madhuri Dixit, Javed Jaffrey, Moon Moon Sen
13.	Izzat	Jackie Shroff, Sangeeta Bijlani, Shakti Kapoor, Gulshan Grover, Paresh Rawal
14.	Prem Qaidi	Karisma Kapoor, Harish Kumar
15.	Patthar Ke Phool	Salman Khan, Raveena Tandon, Vinod Mehra, Kiran Kumar

== Released films ==
Title	Director	Cast	Genre	Music director
100 Days	Partho Ghosh	Jackie Shroff, Madhuri Dixit, Moon Moon Sen, Javed Jaffrey	Thriller	Ramlaxman
Aadi Mimansa	Apurba Kishore Bir	Ashok Kumar, Mohan Gokhale, Neena Gupta		
Aag Laga Do Sawan Ko	Anup Malik	Harish Patel, Kuldeep Malik, Sargam		
Aaj Ka Samson	Kuku Kapoor	Hemant Birje, Sahila Chadha, Goga Kapoor	Action, Romance	
Aakhri Cheekh	Kiran Ramsay	Vijay Arora, Anil Dhawan, Vijayendra Ghatge	Horror	
Afsana Pyar Ka	Shahjahan	Aamir Khan, Neelam Kothari, Deepak Tijori, Kiran Kumar, Rakesh Bedi	Romance	Bappi Lahiri
Ajooba Kudrat Ka	Shyam Ramsay, Tulsi Ramsay	Deepak Parasher, Hemant Birje	Thriller	
Akayla	Ramesh Sippy	Amitabh Bachchan, Jackie Shroff, Meenakshi Seshadri, Amrita Singh, Aditya Pancholi, Kanwaljit Singh, Keith Stevenson, Mahesh Anand, Shashi Kapoor, Helen	Drama	Laxmikant Pyarelal
Antarnaad	Shyam Benegal	Girish Karnad, Kulbhushan Kharbanda, Shabana Azmi	Drama	
Ayee Milan Ki Raat	K. Pappu	Rita Bhaduri, Aruna Irani, Kulbhushan Kharbanda, Avinash Wadhawan, Shaheen	Romance	Anand–Milind
Baarish	Narendra Grewal	Rahul Roy, Sheeba		Anand–Milind
Baat Hai Pyaar Ki		Archana Joglekar		
Badnaam Rishte	Keyan	Pratap Chandra, Uma Maheshwari, Nalinikanth	Action, Drama, Thriller	
Baharon Ke Manzil	Madhava Rao	Mona Ambegaonkar, Roopesh Kothari, Jeet Upendra, Paresh Rawal	Musical	
Banjaran	Harmesh Malhotra	Rishi Kapoor, Sridevi	Romance	Laxmikant Pyarelal
Begunaah	Anil Suri	Rajesh Khanna, Ashok Kumar, Farha Naaz	Action, Crime, Drama	
Benaam Badsha	K. Ravi Shankar	Anil Kapoor, Juhi Chawla, Rohini Hattangadi	Romance	Laxmikant Pyarelal
Bhabhi	Kishore Vyas	Bhanupriya, Govinda, Juhi Chawla	Comedy, Drama, Family	Anu Malik
Bhediyon Ka Samooh	M. K. Shankar	P. L. Ahuja, Praful Ambekar, Brahmachari	Action, Crime, Drama	
Dancer	Kishore Vyas	Akshay Kumar, Krithi Singh, Mohnish Behl	Romance	Anand Milind
Dastoor	Anil Mattoo	Sharmila Tagore, Suresh Oberoi, Pomy Dev, Dolly Minhas	Romance, Action	Anand Milind
Deshwasi	Rajiv Goswami	Manoj Kumar, Poonam Dhillon, Mandakini, Hema Malini	Action, Drama, Romance	
Dharam Sankat	N. D. Kothari	Vinod Khanna, Amrita Singh, Sahila Chaddha	Action, Drama, Family	
Dhun	Mahesh Bhatt	Talat Aziz, Sangeeta Bijlani		
Diksha	Arun Kaul	Sulabha Arya, Vijay Kashyap, Nana Patekar	Drama	
Dil Hai Ke Manta Nahin	Mahesh Bhatt	Aamir Khan, Pooja Bhatt	Romance	Nadeem Shravan
Do Matwale	Ajay Kashyap	Sanjay Dutt, Sonam, Gulshan Grover	Action	Laxmikant Pyarelal
Do Pal	Ravi Rai	Akshay Anand, Dolly Sharma	Romance	
Dushman Devta	Anil Ganguly	Dharmendra, Dimple Kapadia, Gulshan Grover	Action	Bappi Lahiri
Ek Saas Zindagi	Basu Bhattacharya			
Farishtay	Anil Sharma	Dharmendra, Vinod Khanna, Jaya Prada, Sri Devi, Rajnikant, Tom Alter	Action	Bappi Lahiri
Fateh	Talat Jani	Shabana Azmi, Sanjay Dutt, Sonam	Action	Naresh Sharma
First Love Letter	Shiva	Manisha Koirala, Gulshan Grover, Vivek Mushran	Romance	Bappi Lahiri
Ganga Jamuna Ki Lalkar	Kanti Shah	Shagufta Ali, Charan Dev, Goga Kapoor	Action	
Ghar Parivar	Mohanji Prasad	Rajesh Khanna, Rishi Kapoor, Raj Kiran, Moushumi Chatterjee, Meenakshi Seshadri	Drama	
Great Target		Ashima Bhalla, Nirmal Pandey	Action	
Gunehgar Kaun	Ashok Gaikwad	Raj Babbar, Mohsin Khan, Sujata Mehta	Action	R. D. Burman
Hafta Bandh	Deepak Balraj Vij	Jackie Shroff, Ekta Sohini		Bappi Lahiri
Hai Meri Jaan	Roopesh Kumar	Sunil Dutt, Kumar Gaurav, Hema Malini	Drama	
Haque	Harish Bhosle	Anupam Kher, Dimple Kapadia	Drama	
Henna	Randhir Kapoor	Rishi Kapoor, Zeba Bakhtiar, Ashwini Bhave, Saeed Jaffrey	Romance, Drama	Ravindra Jain
House No. 13	Baby	Salim Fateh, Leena Nair, Baby Vijaya	Horror	
Hum	Mukul S. Anand	Amitabh Bachchan, Rajinikanth, Govinda, Shilpa Shirodkar, Kimi Katkar, Danny Denzongpa, Kader Khan, Anupam Kher	Action, Drama	Laxmikant Pyarelal
Indrajeet	K. V. Raju	Amitabh Bachchan, Jaya Prada, Kumar Gaurav, Neelam Kothari, Saeed Jaffery	Action, Drama	R. D. Burman
Insaaf Ka Khoon		Rajendra Kumar, Asha Parekh	Drama	
Inspector Dhanush	Shyam, Tulsi	Vishnuvardhan, Sangeeta Bijlani, Suresh Oberoi		
Irada	Indrajit Singh	Shatrughan Sinha, Moon Moon Sen, Om Puri		
Izzat	Ashok Gaikwad	Jackie Shroff, Sangeeta Bijlani, Gulshan Grover	Action	Anu Malik
Jaan Ki Kasam	Sushil Malik	Krishna, Saathi Ganguly, Suresh Oberoi	Adventure	
Jaan Pechaan	Kamal Saigal	Radha Asrani, Birbal, Sudha Chandran	Comedy, Drama	
Jeena Teri Gali Mein	Tinnu Anand	Kavita Kapoor, Kunika, Amita Nangia	Romance	Babul Bose
Jeene Ki Sazaa	Nazir Herekar	Abhi Bhattacharya, Sudha Chandran, Anita Chopra	Drama	
Jeevan Daata	Swaroop Kumar	Chunky Pandey, Aditya Pancholi, Kimi Katkar		
Jigarwala	Swaroop Kumar	Urmila Bhatt, Shahid Bijnori, Biswajeet		
Jungle Beauty	Dilip Gulati	Joshina, Rajeev Kumar, Puneet Issar	Action, Adventure	
Jungle Queen	K. Chandra	Satish Shah, Feroz Khan, Poonam Dasgupta	Action	
Kadardaan	Kawal Sharma	Sandeep		
Karz Chukana Hai	Vimal Kumar	Govinda, Juhi Chawla, Raj Kiran	Action	Rajesh Roshan
Kasba	Kumar Shahani	Hansra, K. K. Raina, Manohar Singh	Drama	
Kaun Kare Kurbanie	Arjun Hingorani	Dharmendra, Govinda, Anita Raj, Sonu Walia	Drama	Kalyanji Anandji
Khatra	H. N. Singh	Raza Murad, Goga Kapoor, Sumeet Saigal	Horror	
Khilaaf	Rajeev Nagpaul	Chunky Pandey, Madhuri Dixit	Action, Comedy, Crime, Drama, Romance	Laxmikant–Pyarelal
Khoon Ka Karz	Mukul S. Anand	Vinod Khanna, Dimple Kapadia, Rajinikanth, Sanjay Dutt, Kimi Katkar	Action, Crime, Drama	Laxmikant–Pyarelal
Khooni Panja	Vinod Talwar	Anil Dhawan, Jagdeep, Javed Khan	Horror	
Khooni Raat	J. D. Lawrence	Beena Banerjee, Saahil Chadha, Huma Khan	Horror	
Kohraam	Kuku Kohli	Sadashiv Amrapurkar, Dharmendra, Chunky Pandey, Sonam	Action	
Kurbaan	Deepak Bahry	Sunil Dutt, Salman Khan, Ayesha Jhulka	Romance	Anand Milind
Laal Paree	Hannif Chippa	Aditya Pancholi, Javed Jaffrey, Jahnvi	Romance	
Lakhpati	Jal Baliwala	Nirupa Roy		
Lakshmanrekha	Sunil Sikand	Naseeruddin Shah, Jackie Shroff, Vikas Anand, Suresh Bhagwat, Sangeeta Bijlani, Pran	Drama	
Lamhe	Yash Chopra	Sridevi, Anil Kapoor, Waheeda Rehman, Anupam Kher	Romance, Drama, Musical	Shiv-Hari
Lekin...	Gulzar	Vinod Khanna, Dimple Kapadia	Mystery	
Love	Suresh Krissna	Salman Khan, Revathi, Amjad Khan	Romance	Anand Milind
Maa	Ajay Kashyap	Jeetendra, Jaya Prada, Aruna Irani	Drama	Anu Malik
Mast Kalandar	Rahul Rawail	Dharmendra, Dimple Kapadia, Shammi Kapoor, Anupam Kher	Action	
Maut Ki Sazaa	Devendra Khandelwal	Ashok Kumar, Anita Raj, Alok Nath	Crime	
Meena Bazar		Poonam Dasgupta, Roopali Ganguly, Om Puri	Drama	
Meet Mere Man Ke	Mehul Kumar	Salma Agha, Prosenjit Chatterjee, Shafi Inamdar		
Mehandi Ban Gai Khoon	R. S. Ghelan	Birbal, Juhi Chawla, Jankidas	Action	
Naamcheen	Ajit Dewani	Ektaa Bahl, Gulshan Grover, Suhas Joshi	Crime	
Naag Mani	V. Menon	Sumeet Saigal, Shikha Swaroop, Alok Nath, Kiran Kumar	Fantasy	Anu Malik
Nachnewala Gaanewale	Babbar Subhash	Chandrashekhar, Raja Duggal, Saathi Ganguly, Kader Khan		
Narsimha	N. Chandra	Sunny Deol, Dimple Kapadia, Urmila Matondkar	Action	Laxmikant Pyarelal
Nazar	Mani Kaul	A.A. Baig, Asha Dandavate, Shekhar Kapur	Drama	
Naya Zaher	Jyoti Sarup	Navin Nischol, Satabdi Roy	Drama	
Numbri Aadmi	Swaroop Kumar	Ishrat Ali, Rakesh Bedi, Master Bhagwan, Kimi Katkar, Sangeeta Bijlani, Sonu Walia, Mithun Chakraborty	Action, Crime, Drama	
Paap Ki Aandhi	Mehul Kumar	Dharmendra, Aditya Pancholi, Farah Naaz, Amrita Singh		
Patthar Ke Phool	Anant Balani	Salman Khan, Raveena Tandon, Vinod Mehra	Romance, Thriller	Ramlaxman
Phool Aur Kaante	Sandesh Kohli	Ajay Devgn, Madhoo, Aruna Irani, Jagdeep, Amrish Puri	Thriller	Nadeem Shravan
Phool Bane Angaray	K. C. Bokadia	Rekha, Rajinikanth, Prem Chopra	Action	Bappi Lahiri
Pita	Govind Nihalani	Vimal Bhagat, Satyadev Dubey, Irfan	Drama	
Prahaar: The Final Attack	Nana Patekar	Nana Patekar, Madhuri Dixit, Dimple Kapadia	Action	Laxmikant Pyarelal
Pratigyabadh	Ravi Chopra	Beena Banerjee, Mithun Chakraborty, Sunil Dutt, Kumar Gaurav, Neelam Kothari	Drama	
Pratikar	T. Rama Rao	Rakhee Gulzar, Anil Kapoor, Madhuri Dixit	Action, Crime, Drama	
Prem Qaidi	K. Muralimohana Rao	Karishma Kapoor, Harish Kumar, Shafi Inamdar, Paresh Rawal	Romantic, Drama	Anand Milind
Pyaar Ka Saaya	Vinod Verma	Amrita Singh, Rahul Roy, Sheeba Akashdeep	Drama	Nadeem-Shravan
Pyar Bhara Dil	Chandra Barot	Rakesh Bedi, Dinesh Hingoo, Reema Lagoo	Drama, Romance	
Pyar Hua Chori Chori	K. Bapaiah	Mithun Chakraborty, Gautami	Drama	
Pyar Ka Devta	K. Bapayya	Mithun Chakraborty, Madhuri Dixit, Roopa Ganguly	Romance	
Qurbani Rang Layegi	Raj N. Sippy	Sanjay Dutt, Poonam Dhillon, Padmini Kolhapure	Drama, Family	
Raeeszada	Bharat Kapoor	Govinda, Johnny Lever, Sonam, Shashi Kapoor, Asha Parekh		
Ramgarh Ke Sholay	Ajit Dewani	Kishore Anand Bhanushali, Dinesh Hingoo, Amjad Khan	Action, Comedy, Crime, Drama, Romance	Anu Malik
Ranbhoomi	Deepak Sareen	Rishi Kapoor, Jeetendra, Dimple Kapadia, Shatrughan Sinha, Neelam Kothari	Action, Drama	Laxmikant Pyarelal
Roohani Taaqat	Mohan Bhakri	Jagdeep, Javed Khan, Kiran Kumar	Horror	
Rukmavati Ki Haveli	Govind Nihalani	Ila Arun, Uttara Baokar, Jyoti Subash Chandra		
Rupaye Dus Karod	Sikander Bharti	Rajesh Khanna, Chunky Pandey, Amrita Singh	Action, Drama	
Saajan	Lawrence D'Souza	Sanjay Dutt, Salman Khan, Madhuri Dixit	Romance	Nadeem Shravan
Saathi	Mahesh Bhatt	Aditya Pancholi, Mohsin Khan, Varsha Usgaonkar	Action, Romance	Nadeem Shravan
Sadak	Mahesh Bhatt	Sanjay Dutt, Pooja Bhatt, Deepak Tijori, Neelima Azeem	Romance	Nadeem Shravan
Sanam Bewafa	Saawan Kumar Tak	Salman Khan, Chandni, Kanchan, Pran, Danny Denzongpa	Romance, Drama	Mahesh-Kishore
Sapnon Ka Mandir	Pradip Jain	Jeetendra, Jaya Prada	Action, Crime, Drama, Family	
Sau Crore	Dev Anand	Dev Anand, Sonika Gill, Vikram Gokhale	Crime Drama	
Saudagar	Subhash Ghai	Raaj Kumar, Dilip Kumar, Manisha Koirala, Amrish Puri	Romance, Drama	Laxmikant Pyarelal
Saugandh	Raj N. Sippy	Akshay Kumar, Raakhee Gulzar, Rupali Ganguly	Action, Family	Anand Milind
Shankara	Sudarshan Nag	Sunny Deol, Neelam, Sulabha Deshpande		Laxmikant–Pyarelal
Shikari: The Hunter	Umesh Mehra	Mithun Chakraborty, Naseeruddin Shah, Irina Kushnareva, Varsha Usgaonkar	Action	Anu Malik
Shiv Ram	Jagdish A. Sharma	Jeetendra, Aditya Pancholi, Sadashiv Amrapurkar	Action	
Swarg Jaisaa Ghar	Swaroop Kumar	Raj Babbar, Sumeet Saigal, Aashif Sheikh		
Swarg Yahan Narak Yahan	Vimal Kumar	Mithun Chakraborty, Shilpa Shirodkar, Sumalatha	Action, Comedy, Drama, Crime	Rajesh Roshan
Swayam	Mahesh Bhatt	Waheeda Rehman, Paresh Rawal		
The Magnificent Guardian	Shyam Ramsay, Tulsi Ramsay	Shagufta Ali, Beena Banerjee, Hemant Birje		
Trinetra	Harry Baweja	Mithun Chakraborty, Dharmendra, Deepa Sahi, Shilpa Shirodkar	Action	Anand Milind
Vishkanya	Jagmohan Mundra	Kunal Goswami, Pooja Bedi, Kabir Bedi	Action	Bappi Lahiri
Vishnu-Devaa	K. Pappu	Sunny Deol, Aditya Pancholi, Neelam Kothari		Rajesh Roshan
Yaara Dildara	Mirza Brothers	Aashif Sheikh, Ruchika Pandey, Amjad Khan	Romance, Drama	Jatin–Lalit
Yeh Aag Kab Bujhegi	Sunil Dutt	Sunil Dutt, Rekha, Kabir Bedi	Drama	Ravindra Jain
Yodha	Rahul Rawail	Sunny Deol, Sanjay Dutt, Sangeeta Bijlani	Drama	
Zaher	Jyoti Swaroop	Arjun, Iqbal Durrani, Alka Kubal		

== See also ==
- List of Hindi films of 1990
- List of Hindi films of 1992
