= Aditya Pancholi filmography =

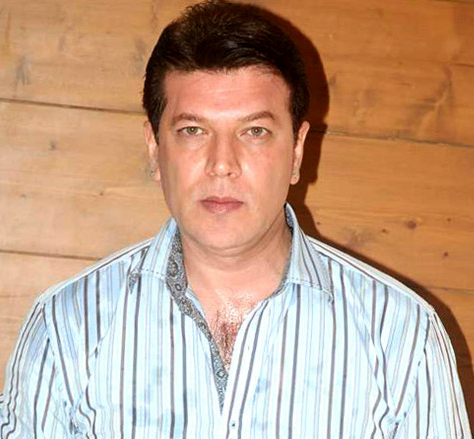
Aditya Pancholi

Aditya Pancholi is an Indian actor and film producer who appears in Bollywood films.

== Filmography ==
=== Television ===
Year	Title	Role	Notes	Ref(s)
1985	Shahadat			
1986	Sone Ka Pinjra			
1986	Siyahi			
1986	Shingora	Nailesh		
1986	Kalank Ka Tika			
1986	Afshar Ki Saali			
1986	Maryam Ki Beti			
1987	Abhishek	Arun Salgaonkar / Abhishek		
1987	Naqli Chehra	Himself	Guest appearance	
1987	Khatarnaak Irade	Sandeep / Pradeep		
1995	Mahashakti	Sanjay		

=== Feature films ===
Year	Title	Role	Notes	Ref(s)
1986	Sasti Dulhan Mehnga Dulha	Anil		
1988	Dayavan	Assistant Commissioner of Police		
1988	Maalamaal	Chander Oberoi		
1988	Dharamyudh	Thakur Vijay Singh		
1988	Kab Tak Chup Rahungi	Gopal		
1988	Vaada Raha Milan ke	Sanjay		
1988	Khoon Bahaa Ganga Mein			
1988	Qatil	Kumar Sinha		
1989	Mohabat Ka Paigham	Naeem		
1989	Kahan Hai Kanoon			
1989	Jaadugar	Shankar Narayan		
1989	Lashkar	Amar		
1989	Desh Ke Dushman	Umesh Gupta		
1989	Ladaai	Amar Sharma		
1990	Awaragardi	Ajay		
1990	Sailaab	Krishna / Rajiv		
1990	Baap Numbri Beta Dus Numbri	Anil / Ravi		
1990	Maha-Sangram	Suraj / Chhota Ghoda	Also Playback Singer	
1990	Taqdeer Ka Tamasha	Inspector Suryapratap		
1990	Awwal Number	Ranveer Singh "Rony"		
1990	Gunahon Ka Devta	Sunny Khanna		
1990	Pyaar Ka Toofan	Shyamu		
1990	Veeru Dada	Amit Anand		
1990	Zakhmi Zameen	Mangal / Raju / Inspector Vijay		
1990	Atishbaz	Adi		
1991	Laal Paree	Shankar		
1991	Shiv Ram	Ram		
1991	Vishnu-Devaa	Inspector Deva Prasad		
1991	Hafta Bandh	Iqbal		
1991	Naamcheen	Rajan		
1991	Akayla	Ajay Verma		
1991	Dushman Devta	Suraj		
1991	Saathi	Suraj		
1991	Jeevan Daata	Vishnu		
1991	Paap Ki Aandhi	CBI Inspector Vikrant		
1992	Yaad Rakhegi Duniya	Vicky Anand		
1992	Sahebzaade	Rahul		
1992	Tahalka	Captain Rakesh		
1993	Chor Aur Chaand	Suraj "Surya"	Also Producer	
1993	Bomb Blast	Sikandar Supari		
1993	Muqabla	Traffic Constable Deepak		
1993	Game	Raja		
1993	Jan Per Khel Kar	Inspector Suraj		
1993	Tahqiqaat	Peter		
1994	Aatish: Feel the Fire	Nawab		
1995	Ram Shastra	Inspector Kavi		
1995	Ravan Raaj: A True Story	Dr. Amir Khurana		
1995	The Gambler	Inspector Shiva		
1995	Surakshaa	Suraj / Prince Vijay		
1996	Khilona	Rajkumar		
1996	Zordaar	Shiva/Tony		
1996	Muqadama	Inspector Manoj Saigal		
1996	Mafia	Inspector Bhagat Singh		
1996	Jung	Ram / Billa		
1996	Ek Tha Raja	Raj Dogra		
1997	Yes Boss	Siddharth Chaudhary		
1997	Hameshaa	Yash Vardhan		
1997	Jodidar	Forest Officer		
1997	Gundagardi	Raja		
1998	Zanjeer: The Chain			
1998	Devta	Assistant Commissioner of Police Rakesh Mehra		
1998	Military Raaj	cadet Aspak		
1998	Hafta Vasuli	Salim		
1999	Aaya Toofan	Noor Mohammed Azaad		
1999	Benaam	Shera		
2000	Bhai No. 1	Bade Bhai		
2000	Baaghi	Vikram		
2000	Jung	Inspector Khan		
2000	Tarkieb	Mohan Multani		
2001	Baghaawat – Ek Jung	Arjun		
2002	Yeh Dil Aashiqanaa	Akhmash Jalaal		
2002	Aankhen	Police Inspector Thakur		
2002	Gautam Govinda	Sagar Thakur		
2002	Jaani Dushman: Ek Anokhi Kahani	Ashok Kejriwal		
2003	Chalte Chalte	Hostile businessman		
2003	Border Hindustan Ka	Ranbir Singh		
2004	Musafir	Inspector Tiger		
2004	Nirahua Rikshwala	Nirahua		
2010	Striker	Jaleel Jalebi		
2011	Dum Maaro Dum	Biscuit		
2011	Bodyguard	Vikrant		
2012	Rush	Roger Khanna		
2012	Idiot	Anjali's brother	Bengali film	
2012	Hridayanath	Antagonist	Marathi Film	
2013	Mumbai Mirror	Durrani		
2013	Race 2	Godfather Kalicharan “Anza” Pandey		
2013	Shadow	Nana Bhai	Telugu Film	
2014	Jai Ho	Inspector Dilip Kadam		
2014	Dishkiyaoon	Nawab Khan		
2014	My Father Godfather	Don Suraj Singh Rathod		
2015	Hero	Pasha		
2015	Bajirao Mastani	Shripad Rao		
2015	Mumbai Can Dance Saala	JD		
