= Doodh Ka Karz =

1990 Indian film by Ashok Gaikwad

- Directed by: Ashok Gaekwad
- Written by: Santosh Saroj, Raj Kumar Bedi
- Produced by: Salim Akhtar
- Starring: Jackie Shroff; Neelam Kothari
- Cinematography: Akram Khan
- Edited by: Waman B. Bhosle; Gurudutt Shirali
- Music by: Anu Malik
- Production company: Aftab Pictures
- Release date: 21 August 1990 (India)
- Country: India
- Language: Hindi

Doodh Ka Karz (English: Debt of milk) is a 1990 Indian Bollywood action drama film directed by Ashok Gaekwad and produced by Salim Akhtar. The film was dubbed in Marathi as Dudhache Upkar. It stars Jackie Shroff and Neelam Kothari in pivotal roles.

== Plot ==
Suraj is the only son of a widow, Parvati, whose husband was wrongfully accused of stealing and brutally beaten. He died of a heart attack due to the embarrassment and wished his son to clear his name one day. The culprits tried to murder Parvati too, but she was saved by a blacksmith from a nearby village. Once older, Suraj falls in love with Reshma (one of the culprits' daughters) after saving her life from a snake bite. The rest of the story follows Suraj and his father's pet snake as they avenge their father.

== Cast ==
- Jackie Shroff ... Suraj
- Neelam Kothari ... Reshma
- Varsha Usgaonkar ....Kajari
- Prem Chopra ... Sampath
- Aruna Irani ... Parvati
- Amrish Puri ... Chhotey Thakur Raghuvir Singh
- Gulshan Grover ... Ajit B. Singh
- Goga Kapoor ... Dharma Lohar
- Sadashiv Amrapurkar ... Bhairav Singh
- Master Rinku ...Junior Suraj
- Sudhir as Jumman

== Soundtrack ==
All songs were penned by Anand Bakshi, composed by Anu Malik, and sung by Anuradha Paudwal and Mohammed Aziz. "Tumhain Dil Se Kaise.." and "Shuru Ho Rahi Hai.." were popular songs from the movie.

#	Title	Singer(s)
1	"Tumhein Dil Se Kaise Juda Hum Karenge"	Mohammed Aziz, Anuradha Paudwal
2	"Shuru Ho Rahi Hai Prem Kahani"	Mohammed Aziz, Anuradha Paudwal
3	"Been Bajata Ja Sapare"	Anuradha Paudwal
4	"Rasta To Mil Gaya Hai"	Shabbir Kumar
5	"Been Bajaun Tujhe Bulaun"	Mohammed Aziz
6	"Mere Munne Bhool Na Jana"	Mohammed Aziz, Anuradha Paudwal
