= Fauji (1995 film) =

Fauji फौजी
- Promotional Poster
- Directed by: Lawrence D'Souza
- Produced by: Gagan Chadha
- Starring: Dharmendra; Raj Babbar; Farah; Sonu Walia
- Cinematography: Lawrence D'Souza
- Music by: Vishal Bhardwaj
- Release date: 24 November 1995
- Country: India
- Language: Hindi

Fauji is a 1995 Indian Hindi-language action drama film directed by Lawrence D'Souza. The film stars Dharmendra, Raj Babbar, Farah, Sonu Walia in lead roles.

== Cast ==
- Dharmendra as Fauji Shamsher Singh
- Raj Babbar as Arjun Sinha
- Farah as Roopa
- Sonu Walia as Lajwanti "Lajjo"
- Amita Nangia as Tulsi / Reshma
- Sudhir Dalvi as Bansilal Sinha
- Bharat Kapoor as Thakur Karan Singh
- Raza Murad as Thakur Suryanarayan Singh
- Kiran Kumar as Daku Durjan Singh

== Music ==
Song	Singer
"Reshma Reshma"	Asha Bhosle
"Tere Bina Nahin"	Kumar Sanu
"Tere Bina Nahin"	Kavita Krishnamurthy
"Woh Mera Jaani"	Kavita Krishnamurthy
"Kabhi Ankh Milay"	Kavita Krishnamurthy
"Hongi Teri Majbooriyan"	Kavita Krishnamurthy, Mohammed Aziz
