= Hathyar (1989 film) =

- Directed by: J. P. Dutta
- Written by: J. P. Dutta
- Produced by: F. A. Nadiadwala
- Starring: Dharmendra; Rishi Kapoor; Sanjay Dutt; Amrita Singh; Sangeeta Bijlani; Asha Parekh; Kulbhushan Kharbanda; Paresh Rawal
- Cinematography: Ishwar R. Bidri
- Edited by: Deepak Wirkud
- Music by: Laxmikant–Pyarelal
- Distributed by: F. A. Films
- Release date: 10 March 1989
- Running time: 170 minutes
- Country: India
- Language: Hindi

Hathyar (transl. Weapon) is a 1989 Indian Hindi-language action crime film written and directed by J. P. Dutta. It features an ensemble cast of Dharmendra, Rishi Kapoor, Sanjay Dutt, Amrita Singh, Sangeeta Bijlani, Asha Parekh, Kulbhushan Kharbanda and Paresh Rawal. The film focuses on how poverty forces a youngster (Dutt) to turn to crime by joining forces with the biggest don in town (Dharmendra), much to the chargin of his mother (Parekh), his lover (Singh) and his friend and the don's brother (Kapoor).

The film released worldwide on 10 March 1989 and was a critical and moderate commercial success. Over time, it has been considered as one of Dutt's best films, which probably gave the best description about the underworld. The performance of Sanjay Dutt is also regarded as one of the best in his career.

== Plot ==
Avinash (Sanjay Dutt) and his parents (Kulbhushan Kharbanda, Asha Parekh) come to Bombay where they miserably scrape along. Sometimes their acquaintance with Samiulla Khan (Rishi Kapoor), the younger brother of the underworld crime lord Khushal Khan (Dharmendra), is quite helpful as Sami, who refuses to deal with his brother's business, enjoys a good reputation. But after some bitter experiences, Avinash's father cannot stand his poor situation anymore and commits suicide. Now Avinash bears the responsibility to be the family's breadwinner which he, as he doesn't manage to find a job, is unable to fulfill. Desperately (and instigated by his friend Satyajeet Puri (Pakya) from the local gang) he starts stealing. After having killed one of his victims, he gets more and more bogged down in the mire of crime – and gets into the rivalry between the gang bosses Khushal Khan and Rajan Anna (Paresh Rawal).

== Cast ==
- Dharmendra as Khushal Khan
- Rishi Kapoor as Samiullah Khan
- Sanjay Dutt as Avinash
- Amrita Singh as Suman
- Sangeeta Bijlani as Jenny
- Asha Parekh as Avinash's Mother
- Kulbhushan Kharbanda as Avinash's Father
- Paresh Rawal as Rajan Anna
- Satyajeet as Pakya
- Shyama as Suman's Grandmother
- Avtar Gill as Khushal Khan's Advocate
- Puneet Issar as Rajan Anna's Henchman
- Mahesh Anand as Afzal (Khushal Khan's Henchman)
- Javed Khan Amrohi as Pickpocketer
- Iftekhar as Don
- Ram Mohan as Mishra

== Production ==
This was the first film signed by Sangeeta Bijlani. although Qatil (1988) which she simultaneously signed released first. Anil Kapoor was supposed to play the role of Avinash but then he was replaced by Dutt. This is also the first Bollywood film to make use of real AK-47 guns although their bullets were made of rubber.

== Songs ==
Composed by Laxmikant–Pyarelal and written by Hasan Kamal

1. "Der Aaye Dursat Aaye v1" - Kavita Krishnamurthy
2. "Der Aaye Dursat Aaye v2" - Kavita Krishnamurthy
3. "Jalwa Dekhoge Kya Ji" - Alisha Chinoy
4. "O Senor O Senor" - Anuradha Paudwal, Shailendra Singh

== Reception ==
Parekh was noted for her performance. According to Encyclopaedia of Indian Cinema, the film is Dutta's best known film, and it "extended the ancestral conflict into Bombay's gang wars". According to Sukanya Verma of The Hindu, the film was one of several "Rajasthan-based feudal dramas" by Dutta which "stood tall on a mass of machismo".
