= Phool Aur Kaante =

1991 Indian film by Kuku Kohli

- Poster
- Directed by: Kuku Kohli
- Written by: Iqbal Durrani
- Produced by: Dinesh Patel
- Starring: Ajay Devgan; Madhoo; Aruna Irani; Jagdeep; Amrish Puri
- Cinematography: Thomas. A. Xavier
- Edited by: Suresh Chaturvedi
- Music by: Nadeem-Shravan
- Release date: 22 November 1991
- Running time: 180 minutes
- Country: India
- Language: Hindi
- Budget: ₹3 crore
- Box office: est. ₹12 crore

Phool Aur Kaante (transl. Flowers and Thorns) is a 1991 Indian Hindi-language action-romance film directed by Kuku Kohli. It stars Ajay Devgan, Madhoo, Aruna Irani, Jagdeep and Amrish Puri among others. The film marked the debut of Devgan, son of stunt and action choreographer Veeru Devgan, and Madhoo, niece of actress Hema Malini. The film was a Super blockbuster and earned 2.87cr footfalls and won Devgan the Filmfare Award for Best Male Debut for 1991. This film was remade in Telugu as Varasudu and in Odia as Dhire Dhire Prema Hela.

Phool Aur Kaante was noted for its soundtrack and action sequences. Devgan's entry in the film became very popular where he appeared standing, balancing on two moving motorcycles. Similar stunts have been repeated in a number of films since, sometimes by Devgan himself.

Some scenes of the film were shot at Vanganga Lake near Silvassa (capital of the then union territory of Dadra and Nagar Haveli).

Upon release, the film received positive response both from critics and audience. Despite released along with a much bigger star studded Lamhe, it emerged as a major success at box office and was the fifth highest-grossing film of that year.

== Synopsis ==
Nageshwar, also known as 'Don' (played by Amrish Puri), is the head of a vast criminal empire. He has one child, a son named Ajay (played by Ajay Devgan). Ajay's wife Pooja (played by Madhoo) is also an only child and would like to put an end to all these criminal activities. When Nageshwar starts to show signs of ageing, he decides that the time has come for Ajay to take over from him. However, a number of Nageshwar's associates are unhappy with this choice and, under the leadership of Shankar Dhanraj, they kidnap Ajay's infant son, Gopal. Will Nageshwar negotiate his grandson's release, or will he become another sacrifice to his 'empire'? How will Ajay and his wife react?

== Cast ==
- Ajay Devgan as Ajay Salgaonkar
- Madhoo as Pooja Salgaonkar (née Singh), Ajay's wife.
- Amrish Puri as Nageshwar "Don" Salgaonkar, Ajay's father.
- Arif Khan as Rocky college student
- Raza Murad as Shankar Dhanraj
- Satyendra Kapoor as College Principal
- Anjana Mumtaz as Lakshmi Salgaonkar, Nageshwar's late wife and Ajay's late mother. (cameo appearance)
- Aparajita Bhushan as Mrs. Singh, Pooja's mother.
- Goga Kapoor as Jagga Dhanraj, Shankar's brother.
- Suresh Chatwal as Brijlal Tiwari
- Dan Dhanoa as Drug Dealer
- Aruna Irani as Professor Batliwala
- Jagdeep as Professor Bihari
- Iqbal Durrani as Dhanraj
- Purnima as Mrs. Salgaonkar, Don's mother and Ajay's grandmother.
- Pankaj Berry as Ajay's college friend (cameo appearance)
- Brahmachari as Police Inspector
- Rana Jung Bahadur as Shankar's henchman
- Ghanshyam Rohera as College Office Peon

== Awards ==
37th Filmfare Awards:

Won

- Best Male Debut – Ajay Devgan

Nominated

- Filmfare Award for Best Female Debut - Madhoo
- Best Supporting Actor – Amrish Puri
- Best Music Director – Nadeem–Shravan

== Soundtrack ==
The soundtrack of Phool Aur Kaante was composed by the music duo Nadeem Shravan. The lyrics were written by Sameer and Rani Malik. The album was an all time chartbuster and the songs "Tumse Milne Ko Dil Karta Hai", "Dheere Dheere Pyar Ko Badhana Hai", "Maine Pyaar Tumhi Se Kiya Hai" were very popular. Singers Kumar Sanu, Anuradha Paudwal, Udit Narayan, Alka Yagnik and Alisha Chinai rendered their voices in this album. The song "Maine Pyar Tumhi Se Kiya Hai" topped the Binaca Geetmala List of 1992.

Phool Aur Kaante

Studio album by Nadeem Shravan
- Released: 1991
- Genre: Feature film soundtrack
- Length: 41:53
- Labels: Tips and Zee Music Company
- Producer: Nadeem Shravan

Nadeem Shravan chronology
Saathi (1991)	Phool Aur Kaante (1991)	Pyaar Ka Saaya (1991)

Professional ratings
Review scores
Source	Rating
Planet Bollywood	8.5/10 stars

#	Title	Singer(s)
1	"Tumse Milne Ko Dil Karta Hai"	Kumar Sanu & Alka Yagnik
2	"Maine Pyaar Tumhi Se Kiya Hai"	Kumar Sanu & Anuradha Paudwal
3	"Premi Aashiq Aawara"	Kumar Sanu
4	"Jise Dekh Mera Dil Dhadka"	Kumar Sanu
5	"I Love You"	Udit Narayan & Alisha Chinai
6	"Dheere Dheere Pyar Ko Badhana Hai"	Kumar Sanu & Alka Yagnik
7	"Pehli Baarish Main Aur Tu"	Kumar Sanu & Anuradha Paudwal
8	"Dheere Dheere Hausla"	Kumar Sanu & Alka Yagnik
