= Rachita Kumar =

Rachita Kumar (also known as Nandini Rachita Kumar, born c. 1962) was an Indian former model and beauty pageant titleholder who won Miss India 1981. She later represented her country in the Miss Universe 1981 pageant. Her sister Suchita Kumar participated in Miss World 1984.

== Personal life ==
She got married and was living in Bangalore as a home maker. She died on December 5, 2025.

Preceded by Sangeeta Bijlani	Miss India Universe; 1981	Succeeded by Pamela Chaudry Singh
