= Shiv Ram =

1991 film by Jagdish A Sharma

- Poster
- Directed by: Jagdish A. Sharma
- Written by: Anwar Khan (dialogues); Anwar Sagar (lyrics)
- Screenplay by: S. Khan
- Story by: S. Khan
- Produced by: Jai Sharma
- Starring: Jeetendra; Aditya Pancholi; Javed Jaffrey; Sangeeta Bijlani; Ekta Sohini
- Cinematography: Joe D'Souza
- Edited by: Hussain A Burmawalla
- Music by: Rajesh Roshan
- Production company: Tanushree Films
- Release date: 19 July 1991
- Country: India
- Language: Hindi

Shiv Ram is a 1991 Hindi-language action film, produced by Jai Sharma under the Tanushree Films banner and directed by Jagdish A. Sharma. It stars Jeetendra, Aditya Pancholi, Javed Jaffrey, Sangeeta Bijlani, Ekta Sohini and music composed by Rajesh Roshan.

== Cast ==
- Jeetendra as Inspector Shiv
- Aditya Pancholi as Inspector Ram
- Javed Jaffrey as Javed
- Sangeeta Bijlani as Sangeeta
- Ekta Sohini as Manisha
- Sadashiv Amrapurkar as Babu Rao Bheja
- Kiran Kumar as Sangram Singh / Sanga
- Mahendra Verma as Kaka
- Javed Khan

== Soundtrack ==
| Song | Singer |
|---|---|
| "Tere Lab Se" | Shabbir Kumar |
| "Angoor Ki Peti" | Mohammed Aziz |
| "Gol Gol Duniya" | Mohammed Aziz |
| "Rakhna Khayal" | Mohammed Aziz |
| "Na Shayar" | Sudesh Bhonsle, Sadhana Sargam |
| "Haseen Raat" | Kumar Sanu, Anuradha Paudwal |
