= Tamboo Mein Bamoo =

2001 film by Dil Kumar

Tamboo Mein Bamboo
- Directed by: Dil Kumar
- Produced by: Satish Shetty
- Starring: Raza Murad
- Release date: 14 December 2001
- Country: India
- Language: Hindi

Tamboo Mein Bamboo is a Hindi action film of Bollywood directed by Dil Kumar and produced by Satish Shetty. This movie was released on 14 December 2001 under the banner of Sheela Productions.

== Plot ==
A village girl was brutally gang-raped by three men. She goes to the police for justice but they do not help the girl. When her boyfriend tries to help and give her justice, the rapists kill him. Then the innocent girl decides to take revenge on them.

== Cast ==
- Raza Murad
- Birbal
- Satnam Kaur
- Nitin Bhandarkar
- Gurbachchan Singh
- Hitesh Sampat
- Bharat Ganeshpure
- Rohit
