= Haatim Tai (1990 film) =

1990 Bollywood fantasy film by Babubhai Mistry

- Theatrical release poster
- Directed by: Babubhai Mistry
- Written by: P.D. Mehra
- Produced by: Ratan Mohan
- Starring: Jeetendra; Sangeeta Bijlani
- Cinematography: K Vaikunth
- Edited by: Padmakar Nirbhavane
- Music by: Laxmikant Pyarelal
- Production company: R.M. Art Productions
- Release date: 20 April 1990
- Running time: 140 minutes
- Country: India
- Language: Hindustani

Haatim Tai is a 1990 Indian Hindustani-language fantasy film, produced by Ratan Mohan under the R.M. Art Productions banner and directed by Babubhai Mistri. It stars Jeetendra and Sangeeta Bijlani and has music composed by Laxmikant Pyarelal, and lyrics by Hasan Kamal. The film's plot is based on the story of Hatim al-Tai from the Ta'i Arabian tribe.

== Plot ==
The film begins with a baby boy being born into the household of a rich Arab king. The prince is named Hatim al-Tai and is a very generous and humble prince when he reaches adulthood. As the Prince begins distributing gold to poor citizens in his city, a princess named Mariam comes to his doorstep to ask him for help. She tells him that she is in love with a prince named Munir and they want to get married, but her father will not let her marry anyone as long as she lives. Hatim is shocked at her father's decision and realizes that there must be a reason behind it. Hatim, his friend Nazrul, Mariam, and Munir go to Mariam's palace to ask the King why he will not let his daughter marry anyone. The King tells them of an event that occurred in the past, which leads to the reason why Mariam cannot get married.

One day, as the King was sleeping in his luxurious room, a fairy named Gulnar Pari flew into his room, enchanted by the beautiful chandeliers in his room. Upon seeing the beautiful fairy, the king is aroused by her beauty and tries to rape her. Pari is cursed and slowly begins turning into stone to save her honor. She gives him a curse that whoever his daughter Mariam marries will die on the wedding night, and Mariam will turn into stone. As Gulnar Pari begins turning into stone, the King begs for forgiveness. She pities him and leaves seven questions he needs or someone else has to answer. All the questions need to be answered in order to get rid of both Gulnar Pari and Mariam's curses.

When the King's story ends, he shows Hatim, Nazrul, Mariam, and Munir the beautiful stone statue of Gulnar Pari. Hatim decides to seek answers to the seven questions. The King warns Hatim that the questions are extremely difficult and he will have to travel to distant and dangerous places. Hatim promises that with the company of his friend Nazrul, he will answer the seven questions. Hatim and Nazrul begin to travel, seeking answers to the seven questions. Slowly, they start solving these questions. Every time a question is answered, a part of Gulnar Pari comes back to life. While seeking the answers to the questions, Hatim comes across a fairy that looks exactly like Gulnar Pari. She reveals that she is Gulnar Pari's twin sister, Pari Bano. She thanks Hatim for his help, and they both fall in love. Hatim and Nazrul begin completing the questions with the help of Gulnar Pari and succeed in completing all the difficult questions. Gulnar Pari comes back to life, and Mariam's curse is lifted as well. Hatim, Pari Bano, Mariam, and Munir celebrate and begin preparing for their weddings.

In the last quest, Hatim comes face to face with Magician (Jadoogar) Kamlaq. Kamlaq's trademark words are "Jinn Jinn Jinn du Jinn daara." He is the final hurdle to Hatim's completion of the seven quests.

== Cast ==
- Jeetendra as Hatim al-Tai
- Sangeeta Bijlani as Gulnar Angel / Husna Angel
- Satish Shah as Nazrul
- Alok Nath as King of Angel land
- Raza Murad as Barzat
- Sonu Walia as Saira
- Amrish Puri as Magician Kamlaq
- Dev Kumar as Chieftain
- Rajesh Vivek as Departed
- Vijayendra Ghatge as Munir
- Goga Kapoor as Mendicant
- Joginder as Bandit
- Jasmin as Fairy
- Shamshuddin as Monster
- Dheeraj as Peracholly
- Master Rinku as prince of angel land

== Soundtrack ==
Hasan Kamal wrote all the songs.

#	Title	Singer(s)
1	"Tum Haseen Kis Kadar Ho"	Mohammad Aziz, Anuradha Paudwal
2	"Oye Sanam"	Anuradha Paudwal
3	"Ek Nazar Mein Dekh"	Alka Yagnik, Kavita Krishnamurthy
4	"Mere Malik Mere Daata"	Mohammad Aziz
5	"Aaj Bachna Hai Mushkil"	Alka Yagnik, Anupama Deshpande, Amrish Puri
6	"Ae Jana Jane Jana"	Anuradha Paudwal

== Reception ==
In a retrospective review, Sukanya Verma of Rediff.com called the film "So bad it's good." She further wrote, "In the pantheon of ‘so bad it’s good’ movies, Jeetendra’s forgotten fantasy flick, Hatim Tai, finds a venerable spot. One sees all sorts of grotesque razzle-dazzle through its course of 160 minutes as he goes about cracking seven tough riddles to end a fierce spell."
