= Rakhwale =

- Poster
- Directed by: Sudharshan Lal
- Produced by: Kishan Meharchandani
- Starring: Dharmendra; Mithun Chakraborty; Govinda; Kader Khan; Mukesh Khanna; Alok Nath
- Music by: Sonik Omi
- Release date: 9 September 1994
- Running time: 145 minutes
- Country: India
- Language: Hindi

Rakhwale is a 1994 Indian Hindi-language action film directed by Sudharshan Lal, starring Dharmendra, Mithun Chakraborty, Govinda and Raj Babbar in special appearances.

== Cast ==
- Dharmendra as Ashok
- Mithun Chakraborty as Inspector Shankar
- Govinda as Raj Sinha
- Raj Babbar as Vijay
- Kader Khan as Laat Saab
- Alok Nath as Satyanarayan
- Dara Singh as Shamsher Singh, CBI Officer
- Mukesh Khanna as CBI Officer associate of Shamsher Singh
- Raza Murad as Big Boss
- Sudhir Pandey as Deen Dayal
- Goga Kapoor as Prosecutor Randhir Singh
- Dev Kumar as Bhim Singh
- Rajesh Puri as Police Constable Satya
- Rakesh Bedi as Police Constable Ahimsa
- Firoz Irani as JK/ Laxmi Narayan
- Harsha Mehra as Kimmi
- Yogeeta Singh as Chandni
- Aatish Devgan as Jai Sharma

== Songs ==
Music by Sonik Omi and lyrics written by Kulwant Jani.

1. "Aise Mausam Me Deewani" - Alka Yagnik
2. "Hum Bete Hindustan Ke" - Mohammed Aziz
3. "I Love You I Love You" - Mohammed Aziz
4. "Idhar Shikhari Udhar Shikari" - Kavita Krishnamurthy
5. "Shahidho Ki Chithao Par" - Mohammed Aziz
6. "Sohni Dekhi Sassi Dekhi" - Asha Bhosle, Udit Narayan
7. "Wo Din Na Rahe To" - Asha Bhosle
