= Nirbhay (film) =

- Directed by: Vinod Dewan
- Produced by: T C Dewan
- Starring: Mithun Chakraborty; Sangeeta Bijlani; Sadashiv Amrapurkar; Kulbhushan Kharbanda; Anupam Kher; Paresh Rawal; Kiran Kumar
- Cinematography: Shyam Rao
- Music by: Raam Laxman
- Release date: 26 February 1996
- Running time: 135 minutes
- Country: India
- Language: Hindi

Nirbhay is a 1996 Indian Hindi-language action thriller film directed by Vinod Dewan, starring Mithun Chakraborty, Sangeeta Bijlani, Sadashiv Amrapurkar, Kulbhushan Kharbanda, Anupam Kher, Paresh Rawal and Kiran Kumar. Infamous Mumbai bar girl, Tarannum Khan, may have a small role in this movie. This was before she shot to fame due to her involvement in cricket betting syndicates.

== Plot ==
The movie revolves with a story of innocent young man who is entrapped and convicted in a murder case. After release from jail he knows the truth and he takes revenge on those person behind the plot.

== Cast ==
- Mithun Chakraborty as Krishna
- Sangeeta Bijlani as Radha
- Sadashiv Amrapurkar as Jeeva Seth
- Kulbhushan Kharbanda as Father Francis
- Anupam Kher as Ashok Sinha
- Paresh Rawal as Lakshman Seth
- Kiran Kumar as Commissioner Rana Pratap Singh
- Rama Vij as Indira Sinha
- Arbaaz Ali Khan as Avinash
- Tarannum Khan as Sunita
- Master Sharokh as Master Krishna
- Avtar Gill as Advocate Dubey

== Music ==
1. "O Babu Zara Dil De" - Udit Narayan, Sadhana Sargam
2. "Tujhe Dekh Ke" - Vinod Rathod, Sadhana Sargam
3. "Channa Mere Channa" - Suresh Wadkar, Sadhana Sargam
4. "Nirbhay Nirbhay Nirbhay" - Rafique Shaikh
5. "Maa Kya Karegi" - Suresh Wadkar, Sadhana Sargam, Vinod Rathod, Simi Mishra
6. "Kaiko Hairan Karta" - Suresh Wadkar, Kavita Krishnamurthy
