= Anjaane Rishte =

- Directed by: Diljit Singh
- Produced by: Rajesh Behl
- Starring: Shekhar Suman; Ashok Kumar; Rakesh Bedi
- Music by: Anand–Milind
- Release date: 16 June 1989
- Country: India
- Language: Hindi

Anjaane Rishte is a 1989 Bollywood drama film produced by Rajesh Behl and directed by Diljit Singh and starring Shekhar Suman and Ashok Kumar in lead roles.

== Cast ==
- Shekhar Suman as Anil Trivedi
- Ashok Kumar as Kripa Ram
- Prema Narayan as Prema
- Alok Nath as Ram Mohan
- Rakesh Bedi as Kapil Mohan
- Raza Murad as Trivedi
- Satyen Kappu as Bhushan
- Goga Kapoor as Public Prosecutor Randhir Khurana
- Murad as Judge Khanna
- Ramesh Behl as Ajay

== Soundtrack ==
#	Title	Singer(s)
1	"Mud Mud Ke Na Peeche"	Amit Kumar, Sadhana Sargam
2	"60 Ka Mard Solah Ki Janani"	Udit Narayan, Jolly Mukherjee
3	"Jaao Ji Kaha Jaaoge"	Amit Kumar, Sadhana Sargam
4	"Aur Kahan Aawaz Lagaye"	Alka Yagnik, Sadhana Sargam
5	"Ashiqon Ka Naam"	Anuradha Paudwal, Udit Narayan
