= Gunehgar Kaun =

- Directed by: Ashok Gaekwad
- Produced by: Reena Roy
- Starring: Raj Babbar; Sujata Mehta; Mohsin Khan; Sangeeta Bijlani
- Cinematography: Pravin Bhatt
- Edited by: Suresh Chaturvedi
- Music by: R. D. Burman
- Production company: Barkha Movies Pvt. Ltd.
- Release date: 8 March 1991
- Country: India
- Language: Hindi

Gunehgar Kaun is a 1991 Bollywood drama film directed by Ashok Gaikwad starring Raj Babbar, Sujata Mehta, Mohsin Khan and Sangeeta Bijlani in lead roles. The music was composed by R. D. Burman.

== Cast ==
- Raj Babbar as Vinod Saxena
- Sujata Mehta as Madhu Saxena
- Mohsin Khan as Inspector Ravi Kumar
- Sangeeta Bijlani as Nisha
- Paresh Rawal as Jagira
- Satyen Kappu as S.P.
- Saeed Jaffrey as Rai Bahadur Diwan
- Aanjjan Srivastav as Munim Girdhar

== Soundtrack ==
The score is composed by R. D. Burman, while all the songs are written by Majrooh Sultanpuri.

Song	Singer
"Na Sanam" (Male)	Shailendra Singh
"Aapko Main Gul Kehke Utha Loon Jab Kahiye"	Shailendra Singh, Asha Bhosle
"Na Sanam" (Female)	Asha Bhosle
"Rona Mujhe Aata Hai Re"	Asha Bhosle
"Dil Kahe Dilbar, Mil Yaara Khulkar"	Suresh Wadkar, Sadhana Sargam
