= Mahashakti =

1995 Indian television mini-series

- Starring: Aditya Pancholi; Juhi Chawla
- Original language: Hindi

Original release
- Network: DD Metro
- Release: 1995

Mahashakti is a mini-series, which was made for television and aired on DD Metro in 1995. It stars Aditya Pancholi and Juhi Chawla.

== Plot ==
Sanjay is the son of a wealthy businessman, he has everything that a guy could dream of, but his life is not easy as everyone thinks. From his childhood, Sanjay keep seeing dreams and visions that disturbs him and the name of a girl Kanchan keeps haunts him. His family thinks that Sanjay has some mental problems, but the truth is that Sanjay is not imagining these things. His search for his answers lead him to a village, where he found out the truth of his visions.

== Cast ==
- Aditya Pancholi as Sanjay
- Juhi Chawla as Kanchan
- Alok Nath as Kailash
- Sonu Walia as Jyoti
- Prem Chopra as Sardiman Ramesh
- Gulshan Grover as Virendra
