= Tahqiqaat =

1993 film by A. Jagannathan

- Theatrical release poster
- Directed by: A. Jagannathan
- Written by: K. Pushparajan
- Based on: Post Mortem (1982)
- Produced by: K. C. Bokadia
- Starring: Jeetendra; Aditya Pancholi; Sangeeta Bijlani; Ronit Roy; Farheen
- Cinematography: Babu
- Edited by: D. N. Malik; Shyam Mukherjee
- Music by: Anu Malik
- Production company: BMB Production
- Release date: 3 December 1993
- Running time: 139 minutes
- Country: India
- Language: Hindi

Tahqiqaat (transl. Investigation) is a 1993 Indian Hindi-language thriller film, produced by K. C. Bokadia under the BMB Productions banner and directed by A. Jagannathan. It stars Jeetendra in a double role, with Aditya Pancholi, Sangeeta Bijlani, Ronit Roy, Farheen. The music was composed by Anu Malik. The film is a remake of the Malayalam film Post Mortem (1982). It was the only Hindi film directed by A. Jagannathan.

== Plot ==
Father Prem Fernandes (Jeetendra) , a Catholic priest, is loved by the people. Peter (Aditya Pancholi) is a justice-seeking ruffian who speaks up for the downtrodden, often taking the physical altercation route, with Father having to intervene.

Peter has a dispute with Bhanu Pratap (Danny Denzongpa), a local rich man. However, Peter's sister Mary (Farheen) is in love with Ramesh (Ronit Roy), the son of Bhanu Pratap.

She asks Father to broach the subject of her and Ramesh's marriage to both families. Father agrees, but on the condition that the couple do not meet until he has talked to both families. Mary initially agrees, but ends up meeting Ramesh, and the two get intimate.

Meanwhile, Ramesh broaches the subject with his father. Bhanu Pratap initially dismisses the proposed alliance, but appears to acquiesce in the face of Ramesh's strong stand. However, he sends Ramesh abroad before the latter can give Mary the good news.

Mary then discovers she is pregnant, and confesses this to Father, who promises to find a solution.

However, Peter's girlfriend Roopa (Sangeeta Bijlani) overhears the conversation, misinterprets their relationship, and tells Peter that Father has impregnated his sister.

Peter beats up Father and is arrested. However, he manages to abscond.

Meanwhile, Mary's lifeless body is found hanging from a tree. The local cops declare it a suicide and have it buried without a post-mortem examination.

However, Father suspects foul play and approaches his twin, Superintendent of Police Arun Kumar (also Jeetendra) to exhume the body for a post-mortem examination. When Arun goes to exhume Mary's body, he discovers Father's body in the coffin instead. The needle of suspicion swings towards Peter, who had threatened to kill Father.

He tries various methods, including interrogating the people around Peter, Meanwhile Father's ghost seems to appear to a few people, including Bhanu Pratap, who faints at the sight.

While the investigation progresses, Peter learns through Mary's friend Mumtaz that Father is innocent, and that the baby in Mary's womb belonged to Ramesh. He repents.

Then, one day, Peter spots Ramesh, who is tied with ropes. Ramesh reveals that he was tied up the day he returned from abroad, and that Mary was murdered.

It turns out that Bhanu Pratap had Mary killed, as he did not want Ramesh to marry her. Fearing that a post-mortem examination would reveal the truth about the unborn baby's father, he tried to had her body disposed. When Father witnessed this, he was murdered, and his body stuffed into Mary's coffin.

Arun Kumar, while getting the truth out of Bhanu Pratap and his henchman, reveals that he had posed as his brother's ghost. They fight, with Bhanu Pratap ending up shooting his son. Arun Kumar fights back and kills him.

== Cast ==
- Jeetendra as Father Prem Fernandes / Police Superintendent Arun Kumar (Double Role)
- Aditya Pancholi as Peter
- Sangeeta Bijlani as Roopa
- Ronit Roy as Ramesh
- Farheen as Mary
- Mehmood as Micheal
- Danny Denzongpa as Bhanupratap
- Satyen Kappu as Anthony
- Sameer Khakhar as Salim
- Laxmikant Berde as Hawaldar Sakharam Dandekar
- Mahesh Anand as Vikram
- Bob Christo as Wolcott
- Sulabha Arya as Mrs. Anthony
- Guddi Maruti as Gulabo
- Asha Sharma as Roopa's mother

== Soundtrack ==
The music was composed by Anu Malik.

Song	Singer
"Tu Kisi Aur Se"	Vinod Rathod
"Doob Gaye Mere"	Vinod Rathod, Asha Bhosle
"Na Tum Itni"	Vinod Rathod, Sadhana Sargam
"Dil Ko Bewajah"	Abhijeet, Alka Yagnik
"Mujhko Mela To"	Kavita Krishnamurthy
"Tu Kisi Aur Se"	Kavita Krishnamurthy
