= Aakhir Kaun Thi Woh? =

2000 film directed by Bappu

Aakhir Kaun Thi Woh? (transl. After all, who was she?) is a 2000 Indian Hindi-language horror romantic film written and directed by Bapu and produced by Avtar Ahluwalia under the banner of Bapu Arts International. The film starred Raj Babbar, Raza Murad, and Sripradha. Lead singers of the movie were Mohammad Aziz, Asha Bhosle, Sonu Nigam, and Suresh Wadkar.

== Plot ==
The horror movie is about a female ghost who is on a hunt to find her revenge.

== Cast ==
- Raj Babbar as Raj
- Sadashiv Amrapurkar as V P Sinha
- Raza Murad as Police commissioner/Defence Lawyer
- Jyoti Rana
- Sripradha
- Anil Kochar
- Jitendra Bhardwaj
- Rakshta Mehta
- Jr. Mehmood
- Mashail Khan
- Kiran Randhawa
- Rajendra Kaur
