= Hasina Dacait =

2001 Hindi film

Hasina Dacait is a Hindi action drama movie of Bollywood directed and produced by Rajesh Mittal. This film was released on 2 February 2001 under the banner of R.N. Films.

== Plot ==
This is a revenge story of an innocent girl who becomes a dreaded lady dacoit due to social injustice. Being rejected by her in-laws as well as her own brother, she tries to kill herself but is saved. Thereafter, she takes arms in hand and becomes a lady Robin Hood for the poor villagers.

== Cast ==
- Raza Murad as Thakur Pravin Singh
- Goga Kapoor as Randhir Mehta
- Rakesh Pandey as Police Commissioner Ritesh
- Shiva Rindani as Rana
- Rani Sinha as Basanti
- Ali Khan as Shakti Singh
- Ramesh Goyal as Prakash
- Birbal as Karan
- Madhuri Mishra as Aruna
- Rohit Raj as Abhishek
- K.K. Sharma as Avinash
