= Ek Aur Maut =

2001 Hindi film by K. Khan

Ek Aur Maut is a Hindi action thriller film of Bollywood directed by K. Khan. It was released on 25 February 2001 under the banner of Shree Parshuram Movies.

== Cast ==
- Goga Kapoor as Randhir Gopal
- Raza Murad as Prithvi
- Shiva Rindani as Rana
- Anil Saxena as Ranjit
- Madhumati as Ananya
- Jugraj as Dayal
- Shahin as Dharmesh
- Rakesh Vidua as Udit
- Nishi Verma as Tanya
