= Hridayanath =

2012 Indian film by Amar Gupte

- Theatrical release poster
- Directed by: Amar Gupte
- Story by: Amar Gupte
- Produced by: Nitesh Waghmare
- Starring: Jackie Shroff; Aditya Pancholi; Swarangi Marathe
- Cinematography: Kedar Gaekwad
- Music by: Santosh Mulekar
- Release date: 24 August 2012
- Running time: 120 minutes
- Country: India
- Language: Marathi

Hridayanath (English translation:Ruler of the Heart) is a 2012 Indian Marathi film directed by Amar Gupte, produced by Nitesh Waghmare and shot by Kedar Gaikwad. The film stars Jackie Shroff, Aditya Pancholi and Swarangi Marathe The film's music is composed by Santosh Mulekar, and the playback singers include Sunidhi Chauhan, Hamsika Iyer, Shankar Mahadevan and Adnan Sami.

== Plot ==
Sawant is a respected teacher known as Tatya to everyone in his society his good deeds are such that even after retirement people come to take his advice.He is a loving husband and a supportive father his daughter Akshata is completing her education in the village as she couldn't make it to the city everything thing is going well until. Tatya suffers a massive heart attack which he can't sustain and heart transplant is the only way for survival.Tatya is transplanted with the heart of gangster Nawab Parkar and after the transplant Tatya is not the same he starts to live like Nawab Parkar and also speak his language and extort money from people.

== Cast ==
- Jackie Shroff
- Aditya Pancholi
- Swarangi Marathe
- Prashant Neman
- Kamlesh Sawant
- Arun Kadam
- Chinmayi Sumit
- Ameya Hunaswadkar
- Urmila Matondkar as item number "Yana Yana"

== Soundtrack ==
The music was composed by Santosh Mulekar and released by Shemaroo Entertainment.

Hridaynath

Soundtrack album by Santosh Mulekar
- Released: 2012
- Recorded: 2012
- Genre: Soundtrack
- Length: 20:49
- Label: Shemaroo Entertainment
- Producer: Santosh Mulekar

Track list
No.	Title	Singer(s)	Length
1.	"Aika Re Aika Re"	Adnan Sami	3:32
2.	"Kalya Kalya"	Hamsika Iyer	5:04
3.	"Payala Naman"	Shankar Mahadevan	4:18
4.	"Yana Yana"	Sunidhi Chauhan	3:55
5.	"Aika Re (Solo)"	Adnan Sami	1:57
6.	"Payala Naman (Solo)"	Shankar Mahadevan	2:03
Total length:			20:49
