= Game (1993 film) =

1993 film by Anil Mattoo

- Directed by: Anil Mattoo
- Screenplay by: Sanjay Kumar; Shahab Shamsi
- Story by: Shahab Shamsi
- Produced by: Pammi Sandhu; Ramesh J. Sharma; Naveen Suvarna
- Starring: Naseeruddin Shah; Aditya Pancholi; Rahul Roy; Sangeeta Bijlani
- Cinematography: Shankar Bardhan
- Edited by: Kuldip K. Mehan
- Music by: Anand–Milind
- Release date: 5 February 1993
- Running time: 131 minutes
- Country: India
- Language: Hindi

Game is a 1993 Indian Bollywood action crime drama film directed by Anil Mattoo and produced by Romesh Sharma and starring Naseeruddin Shah, Aditya Pancholi, Rahul Roy and Sangeeta Bijlani in the pivotal roles.

== Cast ==
- Naseeruddin Shah as Vikram
- Aditya Pancholi as Raja
- Rahul Roy as Vijay
- Sangeeta Bijlani as Advocate Shraddha
- Suresh Oberoi as Inspector Pawar
- Kulbhushan Kharbanda as Barrister Singh Chowdhry
- Kiran Kumar as Qamaal Khan
- Mahesh Anand as Afzal Khan
- Alok Nath as Inspector Patil
- Mahavir Shah as Peter D'Souza
- Arjun as Raghu, Raja's Group Friend
- Uday Tikekar as Satish, Raja's Group Friend
- Johnny Lever as Jaggu, Raja's Group Friend
- Pankaj Berry as Ajay, Vikram's younger brother.
- Arun Bakshi as Mohan Vikram's father
- Rita Bhaduri as Anita Vikram's mother
- Abhijeet Sandhu as Young Vikram
- Dolly Minhas as Meghna
- Rajesh Puri as Nachani Builder
- Jalees Sherwani as Ayub Khan
- Tiku Talsania as Kamal
- Sahila Chadha as in a special appearance in "Macho Man"

== Soundtrack ==
Track listing
No.	Title	Singer(s)	Length
1.	"Deva Ganpati Deva"	Kavita Krishnamurthy
2.	"Macho Man"	Sapna Mukherjee
3.	"Pat Gayi Pat Gayi"	S.P. Balasubramaniam, Madhuri
4.	"Sun Baliye Aayi Rut Mastani"	Suresh Wadkar, Sadhana Sargam
5.	"Zindagi Hai Game"	Suneeta Rao
6.	"Pat Gayi Pat Gayi (version 2)"	S.P. Balasubramaniam, Madhuri
