= Haque (film) =

- audio cassette cover
- Directed by: Harish Bhosle
- Written by: Mahesh Bhatt
- Produced by: Mahesh Bhatt
- Starring: Dimple Kapadia; Aasif Sheikh; Sonu Walia; Anupam Kher; Paresh Rawal
- Music by: Anand–Milind
- Release date: 29 March 1991
- Running time: 121 min
- Country: India
- Language: Hindi

Haque (lit. 'Truth' or 'Right') is a 1991 Indian Hindi-language political film directed by Harish Bhosle and produced by Mahesh Bhatt. It stars Dimple Kapadia, Aasif Sheikh, Sonu Walia, Anupam Kher in pivotal roles, with Paresh Rawal, Girija Shankar in supporting roles. India Today criticised the film.

== Plot ==
Varsha has been brought up in an orthodox Hindu family and has been taught to treat her husband as her God. When she marries influential politician, Bittu Singh, she decides to be the ideal Hindu wife and becomes his shadow, bowing down to his every command. When the time for election comes, Bittu prepares himself for an election in which he may become the Chief Minister of the State, while a pregnant Varsha prepares herself for motherhood. When Bittu asks Varsha to accompany him to one of his speeches, she agrees to do so. On the way there, they are attacked, their driver is killed, Bittu and Varsha were assaulted, and as a result, she loses her child. Bittu wins the elections and becomes the state's new chief minister, leaving Varsha in hospital to deal with her loss and mental agony. When Varsha recovers, she returns to Bittu, who now resides in a palatial home, and once she settles down, she demands that he bring their assailants to justice. A man named Shiva is arrested, he confesses, and is sentenced to several years in jail. Then Varsha meets with a young journalist named Sanjay, and it is this meeting that will change her life and her way of thinking forever, as well as bring her face-to-face with the very people who were responsible for the loss of her child.

== Cast ==
- Dimple Kapadia as Varsha Singh
- Aasif Sheikh as Sanjay
- Sonu Walia as Alpana
- Anupam Kher as Bittu Singh
- Paresh Rawal as Shiva
- Girija Shankar as Swami Hariprasad
- Mahesh Bhatt as Gurudev
- Rajendra Gupta as Editor Nandi
- Ram Mohan as Jailor

== Soundtrack ==
| Song | Singer |
|---|---|
| "Kabhi Patjhad Hai" | Mohammed Aziz |
| "Zulfen Ulajh Gayi Hain" | Anuradha Paudwal |
| "Maine Kya Socha Tha" | Alka Yagnik |
| "Is Desh Ki Mitti Ki Kasam, Is Pe Jaan Lootayenge, Jab Tak Saans Chalegi Apni, Milke Yahi Doharayenge" | Udit Narayan, Sudesh Bhosle, Sadhana Sargam, Anupama Deshpande |
