= Goga Kapoor =

Indian actor

- Born: 15 December 1940; Gujranwala, Punjab, British India
- Died: 2 March 2011 (aged 70); Mumbai, India
- Occupation: Actor
- Years active: 1971– 2007

Ravinder Kapoor (15 December 1940 – 2 March 2011), popularly known as Goga Kapoor, was an Indian actor, who appeared mostly in Bollywood films. He has acted in over 120 films, majorly known for playing supporting roles as the villain's henchman or that of gangster. He is also remembered for portraying the role of Kans in the popular TV serial Mahabharat, Ravan in TV serial Jai Veer Hanuman, Daku Shaitan Singh in the film Toofan, Dinkar Rao in the 1990 film Agneepath and as the Don in the film Kabhi Haan Kabhi Naa. His other notable works include films such as Qayamat Se Qayamat Tak and Run.

== Acting career ==
Kapoor has worked in many English plays while he started his career. While working in English plays he gradually became a theatre actor. Later when his acting skills got the recognition, he was offered a small but crucial role in Jwala, which was released in 1971. Soon, he started receiving many regional film offers, but later he stopped working in regional films. After two years, he came back to Bollywood with the film Ek Kunwari Ek Kunwara in which he again played a negative role. After this, he mainly portrayed villainous roles. He has also acted in a successful epic serial Mahabharat. His last film was Darwaaza Bandh Rakho.

== Death ==
Kapoor died on 2 March 2011 in Mumbai, aged 70.

== Partial filmography ==
- Jwala (1971)
- Zanjeer (1973)....Goga
- Dukh Bhanjan Tera Naam (1974) as man came to drink water from Sunil Dutt
- Yaadon Ki Baaraat (1973)
- Himalay Se Ooncha (1974)
- Salaakhen (1975)
- Hera Pheri (1976)
- Khoon Pasina (1976)
- Ghata (1978)
- Main Tulsi Tere Aangan Ki(1978) ......Thakur Ajmer Singh
- Muqaddar Ka Sikandar (1978)
- Inspector Eagle (1979) as Goga
- Mr. Natwarlal (1979)
- Lahu Ke Do Rang (1979)...Goga
- Do Aur Do Paanch(1980).... Jagdish Goon
- Dostana (1980)...Baldev Singh
- Shaan (1980)
- Jwalamukhi (1980 film)
- Yaarana (1981)
- Lawaaris (1981)
- Satte Pe Satta (1982)...Rowdy Goon in Bar
- Bemisaal (1982)
- Shakti (1982)...Yashwant
- Kalka (1983 film)...Karamchand
- Maati Maangey Khoon (1984) as Daciat Goga
- Coolie (1983)...Goga
- Betaab (1983)
- Sardaar (1984)...Abdul Seth
- Phoolan Devi...Police Informer (1985) Bengali Movie
- Sanjhi (1985)
- Arjun (1985)....Ranga
- Saagar (1985)....Thekedaar
- Jhoothi(1985).....Babulal
- Mard (1985)
- Muddat(1985)...Public Prosecutor (Lawyer)
- Aaj Ka Daur (1985)
- Nasamaj(1986)
- Mazloom(1986)...Lawyer Public Prosceutor
- Dilwaala (1986)
- Allah Rakha (1986)....Goga
- Jaan Ki Baazi (1986)...Mahendra
- Jungle Ki Beti (1987)
- Sadak Chhap(1987)...Goga
- Nayakan (1987) (Tamil)
- Shoorveer (1988)
- Shahenshah (1988)....Defence Lawyer
- Qayamat Se Qayamat Tak (1988)...Randhir Singh
- Sagar Sangam (1988)...Thakur
- Aryan (1988) (Malayalam film)
- Ganga Jamuna Saraswati (1988)....Inspector Goga
- Billoo Badshah(1989)...Ramchabile Tiwari
- Anjaane Rishte(1989)....Lawyer Public Prosecutor
- Toofan (1989)....Daku Shaitan Singh
- Ilaaka(1989)....Swami
- Agneepath (1990)....Dinkar Rao
- Hatim Tai (1990)
- Thanedaar (1990)...Lawrence
- Jungle Love (1990)...Gajja
- Ajooba Kudrat Ka (1991)
- Princess from Kathmandu
- Ganga Jamuna Ki Lalkar (1991)
- Patthar Ke Phool (1991)...Durjan
- Khatra (1991)
- Kurbaan (1991)....Daku Panna Singh
- Izzat(1991)....Police Head Constable Ramchandra
- Phool Aur Kaante (1991)....Jagga
- Police Officer (1992)...IG Khanna
- Jigar (1992)....Patil
- Tilak (1992)..... Balvant Singh
- Apradhi (1992 film)...Damodar
- Phool Aur Angaar(1993)...Head of College Committee
- Kabhi Haan Kabhi Naa (1993)....Anthony Gomes
- Aaj Kie Aurat (1993)...Advocate Satyaprakash
- Krishan Avtaar (1993)....Inspector Sawant
- Apaatkaal (1993)....Gullu Malai
- Jeevan Ki Shatranj (1993)...Inspector General of Police
- Sholay Aur Toofan (1994)
- Insaniyat (1994)....Goga
- Salaami (1994)...Police Superintendent Gautam
- Cheetah (1994)...DCP Rajeshswar
- Aag (1994)....Thakur
- Rakhwale (1994)...Public Prosecutor, Lawyer
- Main Khiladi Tu Anari (1994)....Damodar
- The Don (1995).... Bhandari
- Raja Ki Aayegi Baraat (1997) ....Lawyer GyanPrakash
- Refugee (2000)
- Raja Ko Rani Se Pyar Ho Gaya (2000)
- Ek Aur Maut (2001)
- Hindustan Ki Kasam (1999)
- Hasina Dacait (2001)
- Run (2004)
- D (2005) as Hashim Bhai
- Darwaaza Bandh Rakho (2006)

=== Television ===
Year	Serial	Role	Channel	Notes
1984	The Far Pavilions	Diwan		
1986-87	Buniyaad	Aatmaraman	DD National	
1988	Mahabharat	Kans	DD National	
1994-2001	Zee Horror Show	1994 Aafat 5 Episodes/Madhumati 6 Episodes/ 1996 Chandalika 7 Episodes/1997 Ittefaq 5 Episodes/1998 Dayan 4 Episodes	Zee TV	
1995	Jai Veer Hanuman	Ravan	Sony Entertainment Television	
1997	Shiv Mahapuran	Ravana		
1997	Shaktimaan	Bilas Rao	DD National	
1999-2001	Jai Ganesha	Daityaraj Tarakasura	Zee TV	
2007	Chandramukhi		DD National	
