= Raza Murad =

Indian film and television actor born (1950)

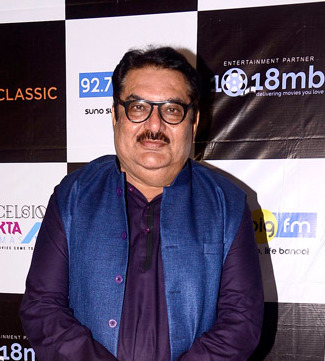
- Raza Murad in 2017
- Born: Raza Murad Khan; 23 November 1950 (age 75); Rampur, Uttar Pradesh, India
- Occupation: Actor
- Years active: 1965–present
- Spouse: Samina Murad (1982)
- Children: 2
- Relatives: See Murad–Rai-Aman family

Raza Murad (born 23 November 1950) is an Indian actor who primarily appears in Hindi films.

He has acted in over 600 Hindi films and has also appeared in Telugu, Punjabi and other languages and on Hindi television.

== Early life ==
He is the son of the Bollywood character actor Hamid Ali Murad. He was born in Rampur, Uttar Pradesh. Murad is the paternal first cousin of Zeenat Aman and nephew of Zeenat's father Amanullah Khan, screenwriter for movies such as Mughal-e-Azam (1960) and Pakeezah (1972). His son, Ali, and nieces, Sonam and Sanober Kabir, are also performers.

== Career ==
Murad began his career in film Ek Nazar (1972 film), and played sympathetic brothers (and brother figures) in the 1970s. Since the 1980s, he has primarily appeared in supporting roles as a father, uncle, or villain.

Murad studied at the Film and Television Institute of India in Pune from 1969 to 1971, and received a diploma in film acting. With a distinctive baritone voice, one of his memorable roles as a character actor was the despondent poet in 1973's Namak Haraam with Amitabh Bachchan and Rajesh Khanna.

Murad had significant roles in successful Bollywood films such as Raj Kapoor's Prem Rog, Henna and Ram Teri Ganga Maili as well as Khud-daar, Ram Lakhan, Tridev, Pyar Ka Mandir, Aankhen, Mohra, and Gupt. He appeared in 1993's Ek Hi Raasta with Ajay Devgn as a terrorist who attempts to rule India. Murad played a supporting role in Ashutosh Gowariker's Jodhaa Akbar. Murad starred in several Punjabi films, including Jatt Punjabi. He acted in Dharam Jeet (1975) with Punjabi actor Veerendra (Dharmendra's cousin) He received a lifetime achievement award for his contributions to Punjabi cinema at the February 2011 PTC Punjabi Film Awards. Murad has been nominated for seven Filmfare Awards as a villain, winning one. He appeared in the TV series Madhubala – Ek Ishq Ek Junoon. Murad has appeared in several Telugu films, including Indra (2002). He played Jalal-ud-din Khalji, the founder and the first ruler of the Khalji Dynasty of the famous Delhi Sultanate, in a 2018 romantic period drama Padmaavat.

== Awards and recognition ==
- PTC Punjabi Film Awards Lifetime Achievement Award for his contributions to Punjabi Cinema in 2011.

== Filmography ==
=== Hindi films ===
Year	Film	Role	Notes
1972	Ek Nazar	Advocate Ashok	
1973	Jalte Badan	Shashikant	
1973	Bindiya Aur Bandook	Karan Singh	
1973	Namak Haraam	Alam	
1974	Charitraheen	Advocate	
1974	Roti Kapda Aur Makaan	Hameed	
1975	Chori Mera Kaam	Inspector Shyam Kumar	
1976	Laila Majnu	Mastan	
1977	Saheb Bahadur	Ajay	
1977	Dildaar	Psychartist	
1977	Ram Bharose	Shekhar	
1978	Chor Ke Ghar Chor	Shekhar	
1978	Chor Ho To Aisa	Birju	
1978	Nalayak	Inspector Ramesh	
1979	Dada	Raghu / Jaggu	Double Role
1979	Badmashon Ka Badmaash	Billa	
1979	Jaani Dushman	Thakur	
1980	Bombay 405 Miles	Inspector Ram	
1981	Aas Paas	Master	
1981	Ek Duuje Ke Liye	Danny	
1981	Kaalia	Public Prosecutor	
1982	Khuddaar	Public Prosecutor	
1982	Prem Rog	Raja Veerendra Pratap Singh	
1982	Anmol Sitaare		
1983	Paanchwin Manzil	Dinesh	
1984	Akalmand	Police Inspector	
1984	Raaj Tilak	Jalaal Khan	
1984	Jeene Nahi Doonga	Jabbar	
1984	Kanoon Meri Mutthi Mein		
1984	Hanste Khelte	Dr. Sen	
1984	Yaadgaar	Balwant	
1984	Haisiyat		
1984	Gangvaa	Duplicate Gangvaa	
1984	Karishmaa	Anand	
1985	Ram Teri Ganga Maili	Bhagwat Chaudhary	
1986	Nasamajh		
1986	Dilwaala	Public Prosecutor	
1986	Adhikar	J.K.	
1986	Janbaaz	Teja	
1986	Mera Haque	Inspector Khan / Jaggu Dada	
1986	Main Balwaan	Rai Bahadur / Heera	
1987	Inaam Dus Hazaar	Nawab Sahib	
1987	Sitapur Ki Geeta	Thakur Vikram Singh	
1987	Khooni Mahal		
1987	Kaal Chakra	Salim Raza	
1987	Kudrat Ka Kanoon	Advocate Bharadwaj	
1988	Pyar Ka Mandir	Adam Khan	
1988	Khatron Ke Khiladi	Minister Parshuram	
1988	Aage Ki Soch		
1988	Kabrastan	William D'Souza	
1988	Halaal Ki Kamaai	Durgadas	
1988	Rama O Rama	Anjani Roy	
1988	Bijlee Aur Toofan		
1988	Qatil	Public Prosecutor Sharad Sinha	
1988	Paanch Fauladi	Daku Zoravar Singh	
1989	Sau Saal Baad		
1989	Vardi	Kalan Khan	
1989	Ram Lakhan	Sir John	
1989	Farz Ki Jung	Inspector Gill	
1989	Anjaane Rishte	Mr. Trivedi	
1989	Tridev	Minister	
1989	Love Love Love	Sudhir Bhai	
1989	Toofan	Minister Vikram Issa	
1989	Jaadugar	Raj Bharati	
1989	Kanoon Apna Apna	Dr. Mathur	
1989	Kasam Vardi Kee	Babla	
1989	Bhrashtachar	Inspector Zoravar	
1989	Aag Ka Gola	Daaga	
1990	Pyar Ke Naam Qurbaan	Inspector Rashid Khan	
1990	Karishma Kali Kaa	Ghanshyam Dabariya	
1990	Pyar Ka Karz	Rajpal	
1990	Humse Na Takrana	Chhote Thakur / Judge	
1990	Naag Nagin	Rana	
1990	Hatim Tai	Barzat	
1990	Bandh Darwaza	Shaitan Pujari	
1990	Kafan		
1990	Aaj Ke Shahenshah	Kanchan Seth	
1990	Paap Ki Kamaee	Minister Sinha	
1990	Awaragardi	Harnam Singh	
1991	Hatyarin	Vishambhar	
1991	Nachnewale Gaanewale		
1991	Paap Ki Aandhi	Pravin Parekh	
1991	Jeevan Daata	Advocate Pratap Singh	
1991	Begunaah	Inspector Kulkarni	
1991	Jaan Ki Kasam	Paras	
1991	Khatra		
1991	Izzat	DSP Sheetal Prasad	
1991	Henna	Pakistani Police Inspector Daroga Shahbaaz Khan	
1991	Ranbhoomi	Sanket Singh	
1991	Hai Meri Jaan	Malhotra	
1991	Banjaran	Thakur Ranjeet Singh	
1991	Phool Aur Kaante	Shankara	
1991	Naamcheen	Jaleel	
1992	Vishwatma	Police Commissioner Pandey	
1992	Jaan Se Pyaara	Guman Singh	
1992	Police Officer	DCP Shamsher Khan	
1992	Jaagruti	Sir	
1992	Mashooq	Bar Owner	
1992	Zulm Ki Hukumat	Captain	
1992	Apradhi	Balwant	
1992	Dil Aashna Hai	Govardhan Das	
1993	Ishq Aur Inteqam	Sattar Bhai	
1993	Dil Hi To Hai	Bharati's Uncle	
1993	Dhartiputra	Thakur Yashpal Singh	
1993	Phool Aur Angaar	Principal Verma	
1993	Insaniyat Ke Devta	Minister Veni Prasad	
1993	Apaatkaal	Raju Rummy	
1993	Baaghi Sultana		
1993	Aankhen	DCP	
1993	Kundan (1993 film)	Police Commissioner Singh	
1993	Krishan Avtaar	Police Commissioner Deshpande	
1993	Hum Hain Kamaal Ke	Zibago	
1993	Aadmi	Heeralal	
1993	Ek Hi Raasta	Kobra	
1993	Gunaah	Minister Rama Patil	
1993	Pehchaan	Judge Jagdish Verma	
1993	Aulad Ke Dushman		
1993	Aakhri Chetawani		
1994	Pathreela Raasta	Police Commissioner Saxena	
1994	Karan	Inspector Jaydrath	
1994	Zamane Se Kya Darna	Gajendra Singh	
1994	Prem Shakti	Kewalchand	
1994	Aa Gale Lag Ja	Advocate Jagatpal Sharma	
1994	Cheetah	Kedarnath	
1994	Mohra	Jibran	
1994	Juaari	Inspector Waghmare	
1994	Chaand Kaa Tukdaa	Sohan Singh / Mohan Singh	
1994	Rakhwale	Smuggler / Terrorist	
1994	Prem Yog	Yusuf	
1994	Beta Ho To Aisa	Thakur / J.K.	
1994	Zakhmi Dil	D.K.	
1994	Sangdil Sanam	Chamda Dada	
1995	Nishana		
1995	The Don	Bhujang	
1995	Aatank Hi Aatank	Aslam Pathan	
1995	Ab Insaf Hoga	Kalicharan	
1996	Jurmana	Chief Minister Tiwari	
1996	Mafia	Commissioner Y. Pawar	
1996	Raja Ki Aayegi Baraat	Raj's uncle	
1996	Namak (film)	Rajeshswar Nath	
1996	Zordaar	Superintendent of Police	
1997	Gupt: The Hidden Truth	Lawyer Thanawala	
1997	Daadagiri	Jagraj	
1997	Dil Kitna Nadan Hai	Pratapchand Varma	
1997	Kaalia	Lallan Yadav	
1997	Krishna Arjun	Thakur Shamsher Singh	
1997	Shapath	Rana Jung Bahadur	
1998	Khofnak Mahal		
1998	Aunty No. 1	Ram Nath / Kamal Nath	
1998	Humse Badhkar Kaun	Sudarshan Sinha	
1998	Sar Utha Ke Jiyo		
1998	Mehndi (film)	Sethji	cameo appearance
1999	Teri Mohabbat Ke Naam	Madan	
1999	Laawaris	Inspector Khan	
1999	Hogi Pyaar Ki Jeet	Minister Khurana	
1999	Ganga Ki Kasam	Police Commissioner	
1999	Safari (1999 film)	Father Felix	
1999	Dada	Akbar Peer Zaada	
2000	Kunwara	Thakur Prithvi Singh	
2000	The Revenge: Geeta Mera Naam	Durjan Singh	
2000	Khooni Shikanja		
2000	Daaku Dilruba		
2000	Aakhir Kaun Thi Woh?		
2000	Daku Kali Bhawani		
2001	Zakhmi Sherni		
2001	Badla Aurat Ka		
2001	Shaheed-E-Kargil		
2001	Hasina Dacait	Thakur	
2001	Ek Aur Maut		
2001	Bholi Bhali Ladki		
2001	Bhooka Sher	Minister	
2001	Ek Lootere		
2001	Tamboo Mein Bamoo		
2001	Meri Adaalat	Sattar Pathan	
2002	Khooni Bistar		
2002	Tarzan Ki Beti	Hunter	
2002	Border Kashmir		
2003	Dangerous Night	Thakur	
2003	Dil Pardesi Ho Gayaa	Indian Army Brigadier	
2004	Bhola in Bollywood	Film Instructor	
2004	Golden Bar		
2006	Family—Ties of Blood	Syed	
2006	Sarhad Paar	General Major Ashwinikumar	
2008	Jodhaa Akbar	Shamsuddin Atka Khan	
2009	The Hero - Abhimanyu		
2010	Khuda Kasam	CBI Chief Sawant	
2010	Toonpur Ka Super Hero	Police commissioner	
2013	Goliyon Ki Raasleela Ram-Leela	Sarpanch	
2014	Riyasat	Minister	
2014	Ungli	Arvind Kaul	
2015	Bajirao Mastani	Mir Qamar-ud-din Khan	
2017	Phillauri	Gurubaksh Singh	
2018	Padmaavat	Jalal-ud-din Khalji	
2019	Rashtraputra	Sultaan Bhai	
2022	Hero of Nation Chandra Shekhar Azad	Sitaram Tiwari father of Azad	
2023	Aazam	Nawab	
2025	Mission Grey House	Lala Seth	

=== Telugu films ===
Year	Film	Role
1988	Tarzan Sundari	
1989	Rudranetra	
2001	Chinna	Public Prosecutor
2002	Indra	Veera Siva Reddy
2003	Johnny	
2004	Siva Shankar	Sobhanadri
2005	Subash Chandra Bose	Ranjit Singh
2012	Businessman	Guru Govind Patel
2015	Rudhramadevi	King of Devagiri

=== Punjabi films ===
Year	Movie	Role
1975	Dharam Jeet	Jeet
1982	Mata Da Darbar	Mangloo
1976	Takkra	
1983	Daku Jagat Singh	Daku Jagat Singh
2017	Toofan Singh	Home Minister

=== Other language films ===
Year	Film	Role	Language
2008	Lagin Majhya Khandobach	Mani Malla (Asura)	Marathi
2011	Mate Bohu Kari Nei Jaa		Odia
2014	RajadhiRaja	Krishnavamsi	Malayalam

=== Television ===
Year	Serial	Role
1993	Kanoon	Syndicate Boss
1997–1998	Ghutan	Mrinalini's Husband
2002	1857 Kranti	Jahangir
2002–2004	Kittie Party	Ajeet Kumar
2012	Veer Shivaji	Shah Jahan
2012–2014	Madhubala – Ek Ishq Ek Junoon	Kulbhushan Bhatia
2014	Zindagi Ek Bhanwar	
2023	Cinema Marte Dum Tak	Himself
2025	Megha Barsenge	Bakhtawar Seth

== See also ==
- List of Indian film actors
