= Atishbaz =

Muslim community of Uttar Pradesh

Regions with significant populations
- • India • Pakistan

Languages
- • Urdu • Hindi • Sindhi

Religion
- Islam 100%

Related ethnic groups
- • Shaikh of Uttar Pradesh

Atishbaz are a Muslim community mainly found in the state Uttar Pradesh in India. The word Atishbaz originates from two Persian words. "Atish" means "fire" and "Baz" means "to play". The Mughals brought members of the community to India from Central Asia. From the Mughal Era, they worked in manufacturing fireworks. In India most of them speak Urdu. Usman R. Aatish Belong To This Community is One & Only Renowned Person On Social Media From His Political Commentary On Facebook .

They also refer to themselves as Atishbaz Shaikh or sometimes just Shaikh, which is also a common surname.

== See also ==
- Muslims of Uttar Pradesh
