= Izzat (1991 film) =

- Directed by: Ashok Gaikwad
- Written by: Iqbal Durrani
- Produced by: Salim Akhtar
- Starring: Jackie Shroff; Sangeeta Bijlani
- Music by: Anu Malik
- Production company: Aftab Pictures
- Release date: 21 June 1991
- Country: India
- Language: Hindi

Izzat (transl. Respect) is a 1991 Bollywood action film directed by Ashok Gaikwad. It stars Jackie Shroff, Sangeeta Bijlani, Shakti Kapoor, Ishrat Ali, Sadashiv Amrapurkar, Urvashi Dholakia, Gulshan Grover, Goga Kapoor, Raza Murad, Paresh Rawal, Amjad Khan, Dan Dhanoa, Rakesh Bedi, Yunus Parvez, Mohan Choti, Bharat Kapoor, Birbal, Harish Patel, Brando Bakshi and Wonder Dog-Brownie.

== Cast ==
- Jackie Shroff as Inspector Siddhant
- Sangeeta Bijlani as Surya (Thakur's Younger Daughter)
- Shakti Kapoor as Constable Kale Khan
- Raza Murad as DSP Sheetal Prasad
- Gulshan Grover as Ganpat Singh (Thakur's Son)
- Paresh Rawal as Minister Kishanlal Pandey
- Sadashiv Amrapurkar as Thakur Shyamu Singh
- Aruna Irani as Sarita Singh ,Thakur's Wife
- Goga Kapoor as Constable Ramchandra
- Urvashi Dholakia as Anu
- Beena Banerjee as Mrs. Asha Singh (Thakur's Elder Daughter)
- Amjad Khan as D.C.P. Shamsher Khan
- Ishrat Ali as Inspector Jagatpal
- Tinnu Anand as Judge Mishra (Voice-over)
- Dan Dhanoa as Naresh Singh, Thakur's Son
- Rakesh Bedi as Villager Usmaan
- Yunus Parvez as Villager Maneklal
- Mohan Choti as Villager Ramesh
- Bharat Kapoor as Inspector Gopal Khaitan
- Harish Patel as Constable Sultan
- Brando Bakshi as Omkar Singh ,Thakur's Son
- Wonder Dog-Brownie as Master
- Master Rinku as Junior Shiva

== Production ==
Initially in 1989, Prabhat Roy, the director of Paapi (1990), wanted to make the film in Hindi with Anil Kapoor before making in Bengali. Later, it got shelved due to budget problems with its producer Ravindra Aggarwal, who previously had produced Bengali film Shatru starring Ranjit Mallick. Then the film was made in Bengali with Chiranjeet Chakraborty and it was remade in Hindi as Izzat in 1991.

== Soundtrack ==
#	Title	Singer(s)
1	"Neela Na Peela Na"	Mohammed Aziz, Udit Narayan
2	"Izzat Se Jeena"	Shabbir Kumar
3	"Izzat Se Jeena" v2	Shabbir Kumar, Kavita Krishnamurthy, Shraddha Aggarwal, Padma Menon
4	"Izzat Se Jeena" v3	Shabbir Kumar
5	"Meri Chhamak Challo"	Anuradha Paudwal, Mohammed Aziz
6	"Tera Sandesa Aaya Hai"	Mohammed Aziz
