= Khatra (film) =

1991 Hindi horror fantasy film

Khatra is a Hindi horror fantasy film of Bollywood directed by H.N. Singh and produced by P. Ram Mohan. This movie was released on 10 May 1991 under the banner of Siri Venkata Films. The story line of the movie is loosely based on the plot of Frankenstein, a novel of Mary Shelley. This was the debut film of music composer Aadesh Shrivastava.

== Plot ==
This is a story of a scientist who tried to defeat death, researching with organs of the human body. One day he manages to steal a corpse from a cemetery and conduct his experiment on it. Unfortunately it is going against nature and the dead man revives as a monster. He has acid instead of blood in his body. The monster murders the scientist in a fire and starts to kill women repeatedly.

== Cast ==
- Raza Murad as Dr Prithvi Verma
- Goga Kapoor as Baba Randhir Rai
- Sumeet Saigal as Vikram
- Rajesh Vivek as Jackson
- Ekta Sohini as Geeta
- Huma Khan as Sony
- Manik Irani as Manik Bhai
- Mohan Choti as Havaldar Mastram
- Vikas Anand as Police Commissioner Mohan Mehra
- Rakesh Mehta as Inspector Jagdish Raj

== Music ==
1. "Bambai Ke Mausam Mein Pyar Kiye Ja" - Kavita Krishnamurthy
2. "Main Hoon Kunwari Kali" - Kavita Krishnamurthy
3. "Main To Ladki Thi Akeli" - Alka Yagnik
4. "Mohabbhat Ki Ada Kya Hoti Hai" - Anuradha Paudwal
