= Jaan Ki Kasam =

- Film poster
- Directed by: Sushil Malik
- Written by: Baba Khan
- Produced by: Javed Riaz
- Starring: Suresh Oberoi; Archana Puran Singh
- Cinematography: Deepak Duggal
- Edited by: Ashok Honda
- Music by: Nadeem-Shravan
- Release date: 28 February 1991 (India)
- Country: India
- Language: Hindi

Jaan Ki Kasam is a 1991 Indian Bollywood drama film directed by Sushil Malik and produced by Javed Riaz. It stars Suresh Oberoi, Raza Murad and Archana Puran Singh in pivotal roles. This film took inspiration from The Blue Lagoon.

== Plot ==
The movie is about how a family traveling by air meet with an accident. Tanvee is the only one who survives and starts to live on an isolated island where she meets Rajan. The story is about their love and survival as they grow up.

== Cast ==
- Suresh Oberoi as Kumar
- Raza Murad as Paras Seth
- Ranjeet as Jagdish
- Pramod Moutho as Bajrangi
- Avtar Gill as Sher Khan
- Vikas Anand as Bholu Kaka
- Krishna as Rajan
- Saathi Ganguly as Tanvi
- G.P. Singh as Native Chief

== Soundtrack ==
The soundtrack of Jaan Ki Kasam was composed by the music duo Nadeem Shravan. The lyrics were written by Sameer.

#	Title	Singer(s)
1	"Barsaat Ho Rahi, Barsaat Hone De"	Kumar Sanu, Anuradha Paudwal
2	"Cham Cham Chamke Chandni"	Anuradha Puadwal
3	"I Just Call To Say I Love You"	Udit Narayan, Anuradha Paudwal
4	"Jo Hum Na Milenge, To Gul Na Khilenge"	Kumar Sanu, Anuradha Paudwal
5	"So Ja Chup Ho Ja"	Kumar Sanu, Anuradha Paudwal
