= Numbri Aadmi =

- Promotional poster
- Directed by: Swaroop Kumar
- Written by: P D Mehra; Shaktimaan; Dharmveer Ram
- Produced by: Dimppy
- Starring: Mithun Chakraborty; Sangeeta Bijlani; Kimi Katkar; Sonu Walia; Amrish Puri
- Cinematography: Anil Mitra
- Music by: Bappi Lahiri
- Production company: Mukul International
- Release date: 1 March 1991 (India)
- Running time: 165 minutes
- Country: India
- Language: Hindi

Numbri Aadmi (Man with Number) is a 1991 Indian Hindi-language action film directed by Swaroop Kumar, produced by Dimppy Ramdayal, starring Mithun Chakraborty, Kimi Katkar, Sangeeta Bijlani and Amrish Puri.

== Plot ==
The plot revolves around an unknown Robin Hood-esque character who helps the poor and honest when they are threatened and harassed by powerful, ruthless, and corrupt people. People call him as "Numbri Aadmi", but they are unable to trace him, though he lives among them.

== Cast ==
- Mithun Chakraborty as Shankar / Dildaar Khan
- Kimi Katkar as Bijli
- Sangeeta Bijlani as Sangeeta
- Sonu Walia as Paro
- Kunal Goswami as Raj Pratap Singh
- Suresh Oberoi as A.C.P. Vijay Pratap Singh
- Navin Nischol as I.G.P Suraj Singh
- Aruna Irani as Champabai
- Amrish Puri as Shamsher Singh / Rana
- Ishrat Ali as Inspector Kashigar
- Rakesh Bedi as Rakesh
- Jagdeep as Police Inspector Hussain Khan
- Arun Bakshi as Inspector Anand Srivastav
- Bob Christo as Don
- Guddi Maruti as Sindhi wife
- Shiva Rindani as Shiva, Henchman of Rana
- Mac Mohan as Jagmohan, Henchman of Rana
- Kamaldeep as PP, Henchman of Rana
- Amit Bhalla as Ranjeet
- Mushtaq Merchant as Champak Doshi

== Songs ==
1. "Teri Gathri Me Laaga Chor" - Amit Kumar, Sapna Mukherjee, Bappi Lahiri
2. "Aaj Nach Nach Ke" - Kavita Krishnamurthy, Sapna Mukherjee, Anupama Deshpande
3. "Chham Chham Bole Mere Ghunghroo" - Asha Bhosle
4. "Kano Me Kahne Wali Hai Jo" - Kavita Krishnamurthy, Amit Kumar
5. "Mujhe Numbri Kaho" - Amit Kumar
