= Sahebzaade =

1992 film by Ajay Kashyap

Sahebzaade साहेबजादे
- Movie poster
- Directed by: Ajay Kashyap
- Written by: Ranbir Pushp
- Produced by: K. K. Talwar
- Starring: Sanjay Dutt; Aditya Pancholi; Neelam
- Cinematography: Anwar Siraj
- Music by: Laxmikant–Pyarelal
- Production company: Shiv Kala Mandir
- Release date: 4 March 1992
- Country: India
- Language: Hindi

Sahebzaade is a 1992 Bollywood action film, starring Aditya Pancholi, Sanjay Dutt and Neelam in the title roles, while some ensemble cast have supporting roles. The story is written by Ranbir Pushp.

== Story ==
In picturesque Himachal Pradesh live Raja, Rahul and their widowed mom, Sharda. Sharda has brought up her sons with a lot of love and affection and both have the same good nature, character and habits - so much so that they both fall in love with the same young woman, Chinar, who is the daughter of Sukhdev, and Laxmi. Raja loves Chinar and shows his love in his own style, but Chinar misunderstands this, for she has given her heart to Rahul. Chinar hopes that Raja, who is the elder of the two, gets married soon, so that her and Rahul's marriage takes place. There are misunderstandings galore, as Sharda and Raja think the proposal is for Raja, while Rahul, Sukhdev, Laxmi, and Chinar know the truth. When the truth comes out in the open, it does cause considerable friction between the brothers. Taking advantage of this are Thakur Bhanu Pratap and Mama, who also would like to marry Chinar. Then Sharda tells her sons to unite and fight against the man who killed her husband. Will her sons give up their differences to avenge their father's death, or will they each go their own way and avenge it in their own style, knowing fully well that only one can marry Chinar?

== Cast ==
- Sanjay Dutt as Raja
- Aditya Pancholi as Rahul
- Neelam as Chinar
- Kulbhushan Kharbanda as Ghulam Rasool
- Gulshan Grover as Mama
- Shakti Kapoor as Bhanupratap
- Anjana Mumtaz as Shardha
- Aloknath as Kishan
- Ram Mohan as Sukhdev
- Rucha Gujarathi as Neelam's childhood role

== Soundtrack ==
The music of the film was composed by Laxmikant–Pyarelal and the lyrics were penned by Hasan Kamaal.

#	Title	Singer(s)
1	"Mata Teri Daya Ka"	Kavita Krishnamurthy
2	"Mera Long Kho Gaya"	Kavita Krishnamurthy, Sudesh Bhosle
3	"Sajda Mera Qabool Karle"	Mohammed Aziz, Majeed Qawal
4	"Gore Galon Wali Mil Gai"	Mohammed Aziz, Anuradha Paudwal
5	"Sajna Khali Haath"	Alka Yagnik
6	"Mausam Suhana"	Amit Kumar
7	"Jai Mata Jai Mata"	Amit Kumar, Kavita Krishnamurthy
