= Devta (1998 film) =

- Promotional poster
- Directed by: Jagdish A Sharma
- Written by: Naeem-Ejaz (dialogues)
- Story by: Meeraq Mirza
- Produced by: Ashok Saraswat
- Starring: Mithun Chakraborty; Aditya Pancholi; Payal Malhotra; Arun Bakshi; Kiran Kumar; Tej Sapru
- Cinematography: Damodar Naidu
- Edited by: Nasir Hakim Ansari
- Music by: Songs: Dilip Sen-Sameer Sen; Score: Rajesh Ahulwalia
- Production company: Mayura Films Combines
- Release date: 2 October 1998
- Running time: 135 minutes
- Language: Hindi
- Budget: Rs 3.0 Crores

Devta (transl. Angel) is a 1998 Indian Hindi-language action drama film directed by Jagdish A Sharma, starring Mithun Chakraborty, Aditya Pancholi, Ayushi, Payal Malhotra, Arun Bakshi, Kiran Kumar and Tej Sapru. This film was released on 2 October 1998 under the banner of Mayura Films Combines.

== Plot ==
Working as a taxi driver, Ballu saves the life of the mafia boss Bajang. This acquaintance leads Ballu to a gang, where He becomes an assassin named Tiger. One day, Ballu gets an order to kill a police officer, Rakesh. But after learning that his old lover Devika has become the wife of Rakesh, the killer decides to save the victim.

== Cast ==
- Mithun Chakraborty as Balram/Ballu Tiger
- Aditya Pancholi as Assistant Commissioner of Police Officer Rakesh Mehra
- Payal Malhotra as Madhu
- Ayshi as Devika
- Kiran Kumar as Bajrang Pandey
- Arun Bakshi as Minister Vikram
- Tej Sapru as Pratap Pandey
- Mushtaq Khan as Lallan
- Avtar Gill as Minister Jagatpal

== Soundtrack ==
1. "Pehle Meri Aankh Ladi" - Hema Sardesai, Lalit Sen
2. "Dheere Dheere Ankh Ladi" - Udit Narayan, Alka Yagnik
3. "Chunri Bana Mujhe Odh Le" - Udit Narayan, Anuradha Paudwal
4. "Ek Toota Tara Hu" - Jaspinder Narula, Sonu Nigam, Anuradha Paudwal
5. "Meri Aankh Tana Tan" - Hema Sardesai, Lalit Sen
