= Yodha (1991 film) =

- Theatrical release poster
- Directed by: Rahul Rawail
- Written by: K. K. Singh
- Produced by: Karim Morani; Bunty Soorma; Aly Morani
- Starring: Sanjay Dutt; Sunny Deol; Sangeeta Bijlani; Shilpa Shirodkar (special appearance); Danny Denzongpa; Shafi Inamdar; Paresh Rawal; Annu Kapoor; Anjan Srivastav; Rana Jung Bahadur
- Cinematography: Pravin Bhatt; Rajan Kothari
- Edited by: Suresh Chaturvedi
- Music by: Bappi Lahiri
- Production company: Cineyug
- Distributed by: Eros International
- Release date: 22 February 1991
- Running time: 148 minutes
- Country: India
- Language: Hindi

Yodha (transl. Warriors) is a 1991 Indian Hindi-language action drama film directed by Rahul Rawail. It stars Sanjay Dutt and Sunny Deol in titular roles, along with Sangeeta Bijlani, Danny Denzongpa, Shafi Inamdar, Paresh Rawal, Anu Kapoor and Shilpa Shirodkar (special appearance).

== Plot ==
Yodha tells the story of two young men, Karan Shrivastav and Suraj Singh, whose lives are manipulated by the sinister figure of Justice Dharmesh Agnihotri, known in the underworld as Daaga. Karan, an honest lawyer committed to justice, is the son of Chandrakant, a journalist determined to expose Daaga's criminal life. Meanwhile, Suraj is a disillusioned former drug addict, victimized by tragedy and now working as a hitman for drug dealers, though he harbors a deep hatred for the trade after the loss of his beloved Shilpa. Dharmesh hires Suraj and skillfully engineers a deep-seated enmity between him and Karan, whose girlfriend, Vidya, is ironically Dharmesh's daughter.

Chandrakant tries his journalistic expertise to expose and unmask Daaga’s crimes. The conflict escalates sharply when Daaga falsely frames Karan's father, Chandrakant, for murder and drug possession. Chandrakant is jailed and subsequently murdered, leaving Karan completely heartbroken and losing all faith in the judicial system. He realizes that Dharmesh Agnihotri is Daaga. Vowing vengeance against Dharmesh and his associates, Karan resigns as a lawyer and deliberately assaults Justice Agnihotri to get himself imprisoned, intending to confront the men responsible for his father's death, who are connected to the jail. While incarcerated, Karan eliminates the jailer and a corrupt minister, further solidifying his path of revenge. Dharmesh’s machinations don't stop there; he also frames Suraj for drug smuggling, leading to his imprisonment as well. The two rivals, Karan and Suraj, emerge from prison with a burning hatred for one another, entirely unaware that Dharmesh is the architect of their misfortunes and the puppet master behind their rivalry. The final layer of irony is added when Karan’s younger brother and Suraj’s younger sister fall in love, forcing the two Yodha (Warriors) to eventually confront their shared enemy, Dharmesh, and unite to avenge their personal losses and restore justice.

== Cast ==
- Sanjay Dutt as Suraj Singh
- Sunny Deol as Karan Shrivastav
- Sangeeta Bijlani as Vidya Agnihotri – Dharmesh’s daughter, Karan’s girlfriend
- Shilpa Shirodkar (special appearance) as Shilpa – Suraj’s girlfriend
- Danny Denzongpa as Justice Dharmesh Agnihotri / Daaga
- Shafi Inamdar as Chandrakant Shrivastav – Karan’s father
- Paresh Rawal as Chhaganlal / Chaggu – Daaga’s subordinate
- Annu Kapoor as Umeed Singh – Daaga’s gofer
- Rana Jung Bahadur as Jailor Rana Pratap – Daaga’s minion
- Anjana Mumtaz as Mrs. Shrivastav – Karan’s mother
- Anjan Srivastav as Minister – Daaga’s subordinate
- Abhinav Chaturvedi as Pawan Shrivastav – Karan’s brother
- Sanam as Bharti Singh – Suraj’s sister
- Bhushan Jeevan as Bhola – Suraj’s friend
- Bob Christo as Christo – Daaga’s subordinate
- Jagdish Raj as Inspector Shinde

== Music and soundtrack ==
The music was composed by Bappi Lahiri and lyrics of the songs were penned by Anand Bakshi.

Song	Singer
"Ladka Kunwara"	Asha Bhosle
"Pyar Bada Mushkil Hai"	Amit Kumar, Alka Yagnik
"Whole Day Whole Night"	Kumar Sanu, Alka Yagnik
"Tananana Na Tananana Na"	Amit Kumar, Kumar Sanu, Anupama Deshpande
