= Kab Tak Chup Rahungi =

1988 film by T. Prakash Rao

- Promotional Poster
- Directed by: T. Prakash Rao
- Written by: Raj Baldev Raj
- Produced by: K. C. Bokadia
- Starring: Aditya Pancholi; Amala
- Music by: Bappi Lahiri
- Release date: 15 April 1988
- Country: India
- Language: Hindi

Kab Tak Chup Rahungi (transl. How long must I be quiet?) is a 1988 Indian Hindi-language film directed by T. Prakash Rao. The film stars Aditya Pancholi, Amala in lead roles. This movie was Aditya Pancholi's first lead role in Bollywood.

== Cast ==
- Aditya Pancholi as Gopal
- Amala as Geeta
- Kiran Kumar
- Kader Khan
- Satyen Kappu
- Mukri
- Vikas Anand
- Saeed Jaffrey
- Aruna Irani
- Rajendra Nath
- Urvashi Dholakia as Laxmi

== Music ==
The film's soundtrack was very popular with the Indian audience. Out of the five songs in the soundtrack, "Mitwa Bhool Na Jana" was a major hit.

Song	Singer
"Gham Sehti Hai, Chup Rehti Hai, Kaisi Yeh"	Lata Mangeshkar, Mohammed Aziz
"Kahan Aa Gaye Hum, Kahan Kho Gaye Hum"	Lata Mangeshkar, Mohammed Aziz
"Mitwa Bhool Na Jana"	Mohammed Aziz
"Haiya Haiya Ho Ho"	Shabbir Kumar
"Dil Todke Na Jaiyo"	Alka Yagnik
