= Qatil =

- Directed by: Ashok Gaikwad
- Written by: Ravi Kapoor; Mohan Kaul
- Produced by: Shama Akhtar; Nasim Hijazi
- Starring: Aditya Pancholi; Sangeeta Bijlani
- Cinematography: Anwar Siraj
- Edited by: Bantappa Rai; Rohita Shetty; Waman Bhonsle; Gurudutt Shirali
- Music by: Laxmikant–Pyarelal
- Production company: Aftab Pictures
- Release date: 23 December 1988
- Country: India
- Language: Hindi

Qatil (translation: Killer) is a 1988 Indian Hindi-language thriller film directed by Ashok Gaikwad and produced by Shama Akhtar and Nasim Hijazi. The film stars Aditya Pancholi and Sangeeta Bijlani in the lead roles. Shakti Kapoor plays the antagonist. Kiran Kumar, Amjad Khan, Raza Murad, Vikram Gokhale and Anjana Mumtaz play supporting roles. The soundtrack is composed by Laxmikant–Pyarelal with lyrics by Sameer.

The film follows the story of a young law student who challenges the law of death penalty and implicates himself in a murder case of a prostitute to prove that innocent people are given the punishment of death penalty.

== Cast ==
- Aditya Pancholi as Kumar S. Sinha
- Sangeeta Bijlani as Kiran Mathur
- Shakti Kapoor as Anand Varma
- Kiran Kumar as Inspector Shyam Verma
- Swapna as Kamla (special guest appearance)
- Amjad Khan as Badshah Akram Khan
- Raza Murad as Public Prosecutor Sharad Sinha
- Vikram Gokhale as J.B. Mathur
- Anjana Mumtaz as Advocate Savitri S. Sinha
- Satyen Kappu as Police Commissioner
- Jamuna as Champa
- Pinchoo Kapoor as Judge
- Mac Mohan as Police Officer
- Mohan Choti as Prison Inmate
- Jaya Mathur as Kumar's sister
- Harish Patel as Havaldar Hamid Rashid Khan
- Viju Khote as Red Rose Club Announcer

== Soundtrack ==
Qatil

Soundtrack album by Laxmikant–Pyarelal
- Released: 1988
- Genre: Feature film soundtrack
- Label: Venus
- Producer: Laxmikant-Pyarelal

The soundtrack of the film was composed by Laxmikant–Pyarelal. Playback singers on the album include Mohammad Aziz, Shabbir Kumar, Amit Kumar, Alka Yagnik, Kavita Krishnamurthy and Johnny Whisky.

Qatil: Track listing
No.	Title	Lyrics	Music	Singer(s)	Length
1.	"Apni Ada Hai Meri"	Sameer	Laxmikant–Pyarelal	Alka Yagnik, Mohammed Aziz	5:48
2.	"Maan Gaye Maan Gaye"	Sameer	Laxmikant–Pyarelal	Alka Yagnik, Shabbir Kumar	4:34
3.	"Bolo Miss Kiss Kis Ke Liye"	Sameer	Laxmikant–Pyarelal	Amit Kumar, Shabbir Kumar, Kavita Krishnamurthy	6:04
4.	"Dulhe Raja"	Sameer	Laxmikant–Pyarelal	Shabbir Kumar, Johnny Whisky	7:29
