= Naamcheen =

- Directed by: Ajit Diwani
- Written by: Ajit Diwani
- Produced by: Ajit Diwani
- Starring: Aditya Pancholi; Ekta Sohini; Satish Shah; Raza Murad; Gulshan Grover
- Cinematography: Manish Bhatt
- Edited by: Mohinder Batra; Satish Upadhyay
- Music by: Anu Malik
- Production company: AMA Productions
- Release date: 27 December 1991
- Country: India
- Language: Hindi

Naamcheen is a 1991 Hindi language crime thriller film directed, produced and written by Ajit Diwani, stars Aditya Pancholi, Ekta Sohini in the lead roles. Raza Murad and Gulshan Grover play the rival gangsters in this film.

== Plot ==
Rajan, a simple young man from middle class family joins in a gang of extortionist with the connection of his friend Satya. Later he confronts the gangster Rana and joined Rana's rival gang. He entered in the crime world but lost his simple life and beloved.

== Cast ==
- Aditya Pancholi as Rajan
- Ekta Sohini as Jyoti
- Satish Shah as Satya
- Raza Murad as Jaleel
- Gulshan Grover as Rana
- Jagdish Raj as Rajan's Father
- Suhas Joshi as Rajan's Mother

== Soundtrack ==
Naamcheen

Soundtrack album by Anu Malik
- Released: 1991
- Recorded: 1991
- Genre: Film soundtrack
- Label: His Master's Voice

Anu Malik chronology
Maa (1991)	Naamcheen (1991)	Chamatkar (1992)

The soundtrack is composed by Anu Malik with lyrics by Dev Kohli, Dalip Tahir and Shailey Shailendra.

Song	Singer
"Log Zamane Mein"	Asha Bhosle
"Insan Kitna Gir Gaya"	Mohammed Aziz
"Mere Preetam, Mere Balam, Meri Jaanoo"	Anuradha Paudwal, Babla Mehta
"Ek Nahin, Do Nahin, Poore Dus Maala"	Kavita Krishnamurthy, Anu Malik
