= Sangeeta Bijlani =

Indian model and actress (born 1960)

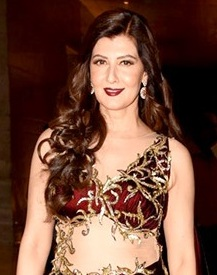
- Bijlani in 2017
- Born: 9 July 1960 (age 66); Bombay, Maharashtra, India
- Occupations: Actress; model
- Years active: 1988–1997
- Spouse: Mohammad Azharuddin (m. 1996; div. 2010)

Sangeeta Bijlani (born 9 July 1960) is a former Indian actress, model and beauty pageant titleholder who is known for winning the title of Femina Miss India 1980. She represented India at Miss Universe 1980. She started her acting career starring in Hindi films, playing a lead role in the film Qatil (1988) and was one of the three female leads in the film Tridev (1989).

== Early life ==
Bijlani was born on 9 July 1960 in Bombay (present Mumbai), Maharashtra, India into a Sindhi Hindu family.

== Modelling and commercials ==
Bijlani began modelling at the age of 16. She went on to do many commercials including ads of Nirma and Pond's soap. Sangeeta received her popular name "Bijli" from her modelling days.

== Miss India Universe and international recognition ==
Bijlani was crowned Miss India Universe Title in 1980. She represented India at the Miss Universe pageant in Seoul, South Korea where she won Best National Costume award designed by her mother Poonam Bijlani.

== Bollywood debut and success ==
Bijlani made her Bollywood debut in 1988 with Qatil, opposite Aditya Pancholi and then went on to act in Tridev, Hathyar, Jurm, Yodha, Yugandhar, Izzat and Lakshman Rekha. She did a bilingual in Hindi and Kannada opposite Vishnu Vardhan. She was nominated by the Filmfare Award for Best Supporting Actress category for Jurm opposite Vinod Khanna and was directed by Mahesh Bhatt and scripted by Salim Khan. She has also worked with Mahesh Bhatt, Mukul Anand, J.P. Dutta, Rahul Rawail and N. Chandra.

== Television career ==
Bijlani made her small-screen debut with Chandni - "a tale of power, revenge and love" in early 1996 opposite actor Shahbaz Khan. She also went on to produce Hasna Mat, with Kader Khan on Star Plus and Kinarey Milte Nahi on Zee TV.

Year	Series	Role	Network	Notes	Ref
2021	Super Dancer	Guest	Sony Entertainment Television	With Jackie Shroff	

== Personal life ==
Bijlani and Salman Khan started dating each other in 1986 when they were still modelling and their relationship ended as Khan was caught cheating. Years later, the duo reconciled during Khan's 57th birthday.

On 14 November 1996, Bijlani married cricketer Mohammed Azharuddin in Mumbai. The marriage ended in divorce in 2010.

== Filmography ==
Year	Film	Role	Notes
1988	Qatil	Kiran Mathur	
1989	Hathyar	Jenny	
1989	Tridev	Natasha Tejani	
1990	Jai Shiv Shankar		Unreleased
1990	Gunahon Ka Devta	Bhinde's sister	
1990	Hatim Tai	Gulnar Pari, Husna Pari	
1990	Jurm	Geeta Sarabhai	
1990	Paap Ki Kamaee		
1991	Yodha	Vidya Agnihotri	
1991	Police Matthu Dada	Sangeeta	Bilingual film
1991	Inspector Dhanush	Sangeeta	Bilingual film
1991	Dhun		Unreleased film
1991	Numbri Aadmi	Sangeeta Rana	
1991	Vishnu-Devaa	Sangeeta Samppat	
1991	Khoon Ka Karz	Sagarika D. Mehta	
1991	Gunehgar Kaun	Nisha	
1991	Izzat	Surya	
1991	Shiv Ram		
1991	Lakshmanrekha	Beenu	
1993	Yugandhar		
1993	Tahqiqaat	Roopa	
1993	Game	Advocate Shraddha	
1996	Nirbhay	Radha	
1997	Jagannath		
1997	ABCD		Final film

=== Television commercial ===
- 1984: Popular TV commercial Vicco Turmeric ayurvedic skin cream

== In popular culture ==
A 2016 Bollywood film Azhar, directed by Tony D'Souza, was based on her life and depicts her relationship with her ex-husband and Indian cricketer Mohammad Azharuddin. Bijlani's character was played by Nargis Fakhri in the film. According to media reports, Bijlani was not happy with her portrayal in the film as she was called the "house breaker" and further planned to sue the filmmakers. However, Emran Hashmi the lead actor in the film slammed the media reports that Bijlani is unhappy with her character.

Preceded by Swaroop Sampat	Miss India	Succeeded by Rachita Kumar
