= Ashok Gaikwad =

Indian film director

Ashok Gaikwad is an Indian film director who has directed several feature films. Most of his films have been produced by Salim Akhtar's production house Aftab Pictures. His first notable film was Qatil (1988) starring Aditya Pancholi and Sangeeta Bijlani. He was prominent in the 1990s with many Mithun Chakraborty and Jackie Shroff starrers. Some of his films are Phool Aur Angaar, Izzat, Police Officer and Krishan Avtaar.

== Partial filmography ==
Year	Film	Language	Cast
1988	Qatil	Hindi	Aditya Pancholi, Sangeeta Bijlani, Shakti Kapoor, Kiran Kumar, Amjad Khan
1990	Doodh Ka Karz	Hindi	Jackie Shroff, Neelam, Prem Chopra, Aruna Irani
1991	Izzat	Hindi	Jackie Shroff, Sangeeta Bijlani, Sadashiv Amrapurkar
1992	Police Officer	Hindi	Jackie Shroff, Karisma Kapoor, Aruna Irani, Paresh Rawal
1992	Sarphira	Hindi	Sanjay Dutt, Madhavi, Kimi Katkar
1993	Hasti	Hindi	Jackie Shroff, Nagma, Naseeruddin Shah, Varsha Usgaonkar
1993	Phool Aur Angaar	Hindi	Mithun Chakraborty, Shantipriya, Prem Chopra, Gulshan Grover
1993	Krishan Avtaar	Hindi	Mithun Chakraborty, Somy Ali, Hashmat Khan, Paresh Rawal, Sujata Mehta
1993	Parwane	Hindi	Avinash Wadhavan, Shilpa Shirodkar, Paresh Rawal, Siddharth
1996	Raja Ki Aayegi Baraat	Hindi	Shadaab Khan, Rani Mukerji, Divya Dutta, Mohnish Behl, Gulshan Grover
1999	Gair	Hindi	Ajay Devgan, Raveena Tandon, Reena Roy, Amrish Puri, Paresh Rawal
1999	Maa Kasam	Hindi	Mithun Chakraborty, Mink, Gulshan Grover
