= Ekta Sohini =

Indian actress (Born March 1972)

Aarti Bahl
- Born: 27 March 1972 (age 54); Mumbai, Maharashtra, India
- Occupation: Actress
- Years active: 1990–2020
- Spouse: Mohnish Bahl (m. 1992)
- Children: 2, including Pranutan Bahl

Aarti Bahl, known mononymously as Ektaa and Ektaa Sohini is an Indian actress. After several small 1980s television roles, she made her film debut opposite Arbaaz Ali Khan in the coming-of-age romance film Solah Satra (1990). She starred as Aditya Pancholi's love interest in Naamcheen (1991) and Tahalka (1992). She is married to actor Mohnish Bahl. Their daughter Pranutan is also an actress.

== Filmography ==
- Solah Satra (1990)
- Awwal Number (1990)
- Paap Ki Kamaee (1990)
- Picchi Pulliah (Telugu 1991)
- Fateh (1991)
- Naamcheen (1991)
- Hafta Bandh (1991)
- Saajan (1991)
- Khatra (1991)
- Vansh (1992)
- Yudhpath (1992)
- Tahalka (1992)
- Basanti Tangewali (1992)
- Shatranj (1993)
- Nazar Ke Samne (1995)
- Hasina Aur Nagina (1996)
- Talaashi (1996)
- Vaastav (1999)
- Gang (2000)
- Vaah! Life Ho Toh Aisi! (2005)
- Aman Ke Farishtey (2016)

== Television shows ==
- Dill Mill Gayye as Padma Bansal Gupta
- Itihaas as aunt Sheila Devi
- Sanjeevani 2 as Roshni Mathur
- Murder She Wrote as Desk Clerk (Season 2 Episode 1)
