= Vishnu-Devaa =

1991 film by Sunny Deol

Vishnu–Devaa
- Theatrical release poster
- Directed by: K. Pappu
- Screenplay by: K. Pappu
- Dialogues by: Anwar Khan
- Story by: K. Pappu
- Produced by: Shakir Noorani; Shakeel Noorani
- Starring: Sunny Deol; Aditya Pancholi; Neelam; Sangeeta Bijlani; Danny Denzongpa; Kulbhushan Kharbanda; Alok Nath
- Cinematography: Sushil Chopra
- Edited by: Sudhir Verma
- Music by: Rajesh Roshan
- Production company: Noorani Films Corporation
- Release date: 15 February 1991
- Country: India
- Language: Hindi

Vishnu–Devaa is a 1991 Indian Hindi-language romance action film directed by K. Pappu and produced by Shakeel Noorani. The film stars Sunny Deol, Aditya Pancholi, Neelam, Sangeeta Bijlani and Danny Denzongpa.

== Plot ==
Vishnu and his younger brother, Devaa, live a happy life with their parents, a hardworking farmer and a devoted housewife. Their peaceful existence is shattered when a wealthy and cruel landlord, Thakur Shamsher Singh, murders their father to acquire his land. In a fit of rage, Vishnu lashes out, killing several of Shamsher's henchmen.

In a cruel act of retaliation, Shamsher rapes Vishnu and Devaa's mother and then kills her. He then frames Vishnu for the murder. Vishnu is found guilty in court and sent to prison. However, with the police on his tail, he manages to escape and takes refuge with an undertaker named Baba.

Under Baba's care, Vishnu grows up, his heart filled with a burning desire for revenge against Shamsher. He learns that Shamsher has changed his name to Sampat and is now a powerful crime boss. Vishnu's attempts to kill Sampat are unsuccessful, and Baba advises him that the best way to get even is to systematically destroy Sampat's illegal businesses.

Vishnu embarks on a mission to dismantle Sampat's criminal empire, costing him significant financial losses. During this time, he falls in love with Paro, who runs a small restaurant. Meanwhile, his younger brother Devaa has been adopted by the judge who presided over Vishnu's case and has grown up to become a police officer. Devaa also suspects Sampat of illegal activities but lacks the evidence to arrest him.

The story sees a dramatic turn when Sampat, realizing Vishnu is the one causing him losses, frames him for another murder. The police officer assigned to arrest Vishnu is none other than his long-lost brother, Devaa. As Devaa approaches Vishnu, he is shot, making it appear as though Vishnu was the shooter. This leads to a final confrontation where the two brothers, initially on opposing sides, must come to terms with their past and the man who orchestrated their family's destruction.

== Cast ==
- Sunny Deol as Vishnu Prasad
- Aditya Pancholi as Inspector Deva Prasad – Vishnu's brother
- Neelam as Paro – Vishnu's girlfriend
- Sangeeta Bijlani as Sangeeta – Deva's girlfriend
- Danny Denzongpa as Thakur Shamsher Singh / Sampat
- Kulbhushan Kharbanda as Judge Abdul Rehman Khan
- Alok Nath as Baba
- Aruna Irani as Ram Prasad's wife – Vishnu and Devaa's mother
- Sharat Saxena as Goga
- Annu Kapoor as Constable
- Arun Bakshi as Ram Prasad – Vishnu and Devaa's father
- Johnny Lever as Constable
- Sardar Sohi as Munim
- Kunickaa Sadanand
- Viju Khote
- Bob Christo

== Soundtrack ==
The music was composed by Rajesh Roshan and the lyrics of the songs were penned by Anjaan.

Song	Singer
"Aa Gayi Aa Gayi Hichki Yaaron"	Mangal Singh, Kavita Krishnamurthy
"Mathe Pe Yun Lat Lehrayi, Khul Gayi Dil Ki Baat"	Amit Kumar, Sadhana Sargam
"Mere Vishnu, Mere Devaa" (Sad)	Anuradha Paudwal
"Mere Vishnu, Mere Devaa"	Mohammed Aziz, Anuradha Paudwal
"Aaja Mere Pyar, Tainu Baar Baar Ji Bharke Pyar Main Karla"	Mohammed Aziz, Anuradha Paudwal
"Dil Tera Assi Tere Hai Deewane, Tere Dil Vich Ki Hai Rab Jane"	Mohammed Aziz, Asha Bhosle
