= Laal Paree =

1991 Indian film

- Directed by: Hannif Chippa
- Produced by: Nizarali M. Maredia
- Starring: Aditya Pancholi; Jahnvi; Javed Jaffrey; Gulshan Grover
- Music by: Nadeem-Shravan
- Production company: Radium Films
- Release date: 4 January 1991
- Country: India
- Language: Hindi

Laal Paree is a 1991 Bollywood romance fantasy film directed by Hannif Chippa, starring Aditya Pancholi and introducing Jahnvi in the role of the mermaid.

== Plot ==
Shankar falls in love with a girl, unaware that she is a mermaid. Dr Jacob discovers this and tries every possible way to expose her, not knowing that she will encounter danger if her truth is revealed to humans.

== Cast ==
- Aditya Pancholi as Shankar
- Jahnvi as Mermaid Meenakshi
- Javed Jaffrey as Johny
- Gulshan Grover as Dr. Jacob
- Vikram Gokhale
- Rajendra Nath
- Kanan Kaushal
- Johnny Whisky
- Bandini Mishra

== Soundtrack ==
Song	Singer
"Mere Dil Mein Utar Jaana"	Kishore Kumar
"Main Tere Bin Jee Nahin Sakta"	Mohammed Aziz
"No Objection, No Objection"	Vijay Benedict, Sarika Kapoor, Annette Pinto
"Deewanon Mera Kaha Maano"	Vinod Kapoor, Sarika Kapoor, Annette Pinto, Javed Jaffrey
