= Aditya Pancholi =

Indian film actor, producer, and playback singer (born 1965)

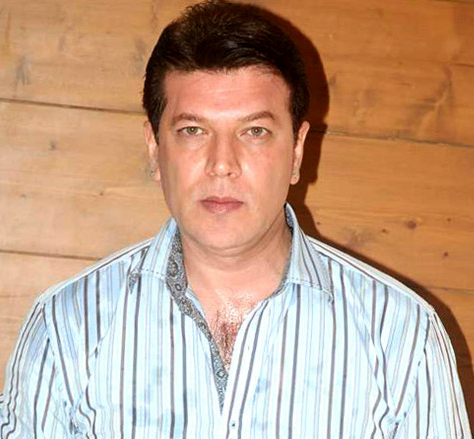
- Aditya Pancholi in 2012
- Born: Nirmal Pancholi; 12 September 1965 (age 61); Bombay, Maharashtra, India
- Education: St. Joseph's High School
- Occupations: Film actor; producer; playback singer
- Years active: 1985–2020
- Works: Full list
- Spouse: Zarina Wahab (m. 1986)
- Children: 2 (including Sooraj Pancholi)
- Relatives: Dalsukh Pancholi (uncle); Aditi Singh (niece)

Aditya Pancholi (born as Nirmal Pancholi; 12 September 1965) is an Indian actor and producer working in Hindi cinema.

== Early life ==
Pancholi was born to Rajan Pancholi, the younger brother of Dalsukh Pancholi, the family being pioneers as directors-producers, having released the first Punjabi film and having owned Pancholi Arts, the largest film studio in pre-partition Lahore.

His sister is married to former actor Jainendra Pratap Singh, through whom his niece is actress Aditi Singh.

== Acting career ==
=== 1985–1987: Television movies and serials ===
He was signed for a few television video films produced by Hiba, which was owned by Stardust magazine owner Nari Hira. Pancholi made his acting debut with the TV show Shahadat in 1985. In 1986, he did the television films Sone Ka Pinjra, Siyahi, Kalank Ka Tika, Afshar Ki Saali and Maryam Ki Beti. Later that year, he ventured into mainstream Bollywood with Sasti Dulhan Mahenga Dulha. During this time, he adopted the stage name Aditya Pancholi.

In 1987, Pancholi gave performances in two television movies: Abhishek and Khatarnaak Irade. In Abhishek, he portrayed a well-known businessman who used his father's wealth in enjoying leisure time and used a new costume to help depressed and troubled people. In Khatarnaak Irade, Pancholi played the role of a womanising lifeguard who got himself into trouble while falling in love with a married woman played by Anju Mahendru.

In 1995 he also starred in the TV series Mahashakti in DD Metro opposite Juhi Chawla. This series was to be released in 1989 as a Vaada raha milan ka, but the film was released as a TV series on DD Metro.

In 2014 he starred in the television film (My Father Godfather), which was to be released in theatres, but was released on the World Wide Web and television.

=== 1986–1996: Lead roles ===
Pancholi debuted in Sasti Dulhan Mehnga Dulha in 1986, which was not a success. He then had his first prominent Bollywood role as a lead hero in Kab Tak Chup Rahungi opposite Amala, made by K. C. Bokadia, the film established him as a lead actor in the industry. Then he appeared in a supporting role in Feroz Khan's Dayavan (1988), opposite Vinod Khanna and Madhuri Dixit. He appeared in Dharamyudh with Sunil Dutt, Shatrughan Sinha and Suresh Oberoi. Later that year, his next release was Qatil, in which he starred opposite Sangeeta Bijlani. Pancholi portrayed a lawyer's son who resists the death penalty and imprisonment and proves himself guilty of the murder of a prostitute, but was trapped when a friend betrayed him by removing all of the evidence.

In 1989, Pancholi starred in the romance Mohabat Ka Paigham, opposite Raj Babbar and Meenakshi Sheshadri. In 1990, he had a major role in Mukul S. Anand's multi-starrer action film Maha Sangram, which featured an ensemble cast of Vinod Khanna, Govinda and Madhuri Dixit. He also sang a few lines in the song "Dhak Dhak Dhak" with Alisha Chinai. He also starred in the comedy film Baap Numbri Beta Dus Numbri in the same year, which became one of the highest-grossing films of the year. He next starred opposite upcoming actress Madhuri Dixit in Sailaab. Pancholi would close the year with a double-role in Zakhmi Zameen, opposite Jaya Prada. His second role as an antagonist was in the sports action thriller Awwal Number, opposite Dev Anand and Aamir Khan. His other releases included Taqdeer Ka Tamasha, Atishbaaz and Veeru Dada.

Pancholi began 1991 with Laal Paree. His next major release was Vishnu-Devaa that saw him pair with Sunny Deol, Neelam and Sangeeta Bijlani. The film was the seventeenth highest-grossing film of the year. He paired with Jeetendra to play one of the title roles in Shiv Ram. Later that year, he collaborated with director Mahesh Bhatt in Saathi, opposite Mohsin Khan and Varsha Usgaonkar. He followed with a supporting role in the multi-starrer Akayla, opposite Kiran Juneja. The film featured an ensemble cast of Amitabh Bachchan, Amrita Singh, Jackie Shroff and Meenakshi Sheshadri. It became the seventh-highest-grossing film of the year. His last releases of the year were Jeevan Daata, opposite Chunky Pandey, Kimi Katkar and Sonu Walia and Naamcheen, opposite Ekta Sohini, in which he played an unemployed young man who steps into the underworld to make money and becomes one of the wealthiest people of his city; but loses his family and friends in the race for wealth and decides to kill the two rival gangsters to rehabilitate their goons and surrenders to the police.

He started 1992 with the romance film Yaad Rakhegi Duniya, opposite debutant Rukhsar Rehman. Pancholi portrayed a terminally ill man who falls in love with a girl, who herself suffers from a terminal illness. Also released in 1992 was the action movie Sahebzaade with Sanjay Dutt. His last release of the year was the multi-starrer action film Tahalka, opposite Dharmendra, Naseeruddin Shah. Pancholi portrays an army officer and is paired with Ekta Sohini. The film emerged as the fifth-highest-grossing film of the year.

Pancholi turned producer for the first time in the 1993 romance action film Chor Aur Chaand and acted in the lead role opposite Pooja Bhatt. In the same year he starred in the action film Muqabla opposite Govinda, Karishma Kapoor, Shakti Kapoor and Asrani. His next release was the action film Game, opposite Naseeruddin Shah, Rahul Roy and Sangeeta Bijlani. His only release of 1994 was Sanjay Gupta's multi-starrer action film Aatish: Feel the Fire, featuring an ensemble cast of Sanjay Dutt, Raveena Tandon, Karisma Kapoor and Atul Agnihotri. Aatish was one of the highest-grossing movies at the box office.

He began 1995 with the lead role in the action film Surakshaa, in which he was paired with Sheeba with an ensemble cast of Sunil Shetty, Saif Ali Khan, Divya Dutta and Monica Bedi. In the same year he acted in the movies Ravan Raaj: A True Story and The Gambler and Ram Shastra with Jackie Shroff, Manisha Koirala and Anupam Kher. Pancholi reunited with Shetty and Khan for another multi-starrer lead role in the 1996 action film Ek Tha Raja, with Neelam, Pratibha Sinha and Indrani Banerjee. Later that year, Pancholi collaborated with South Indian director T. Rama Rao in Jung, portraying a double-role opposite Mithun Chakraborty, Ajay Devgan, Rambha and Sujata Mehta. Pancholi played an innocent train driver who is wrongly punished for a murder that was committed by a look-alike gangster, which was a box office success. His next release of the year was Khilona, opposite Ayub Khan and Monica Bedi. His other movies included Zordaar, Muqadama and Mafia.

=== 1997–2015: Supporting roles and antagonists ===
Pancholi switched to antagonistic and supporting roles as 1997 approached, starting with Aziz Mirza's romantic comedy Yes Boss, opposite Shah Rukh Khan and Juhi Chawla. Yes Boss was one of the highest-grossing movies of the year. He earned a nomination for the Filmfare Award for Best Performance in a Negative Role. His next release was Hameshaa, opposite Saif Ali Khan and Kajol, with Pancholi in a negative role.

During 1998 and 1999 he appeared in the movies Devta, Zanjeer: The Chain (1998), Hafta Vasuli, Benaam, Aaya Toofan(1999). Pancholi paired with Sanjay Dutt and Manisha Koirala to play the antagonist in Baaghi (2000). Later that year, he reunited with Sanjay Gupta to play a police inspector in Jung, opposite Sanjay Dutt, Jackie Shroff, Raveena Tandon and Shilpa Shetty. His last release of the year was Tarkieb, opposite Nana Patekar, Tabu and Shilpa Shetty. Long delayed movie Bhai no 1 with Farah (actress) his only release in 2001 Bhagwaat Ek Jung with Mithun Chakraborty.

In 2002, Pancholi had his next major release with a supporting role in Vipul Amrutlal Shah's heist thriller Aankhen, which featured an ensemble cast of Amitabh Bachchan, Akshay Kumar, Arjun Rampal, Sushmita Sen and Paresh Rawal. The film was one of the highest-grossing films of the year. His other releases of 2002 were Jaani Dushman: Ek Anokhi Kahani, Gautam Govinda and Yeh Dil Aashiqanaa. In 2003 he appeared in a patriotic movie Border Hindustan Ka, with Faisal Khan, Rajat Bedi, Akshaye Khanna and Sudesh Berry. He made a cameo appearance in Chalte Chalte.

Pancholi collaborated with Sanjay Gupta for the fifth time in the 2004 action thriller Musafir, playing the main antagonist opposite Anil Kapoor, Sameera Reddy, Mahesh Manjrekar, Koena Mitra, Shakti Kapoor and Sanjay Dutt. The movie received negative reviews, but Pancholi received positive reviews for his performance, with Taran Adarsh labelling his performance "first-rate".

Pancholi had a comeback as the antagonist in Chandan Arora's low-budget action film Striker (2010). Pancholi restricted himself to antagonist and character roles, with films such as Rush (2012), Hridayanath (2012), Mumbai Mirror (2013), Race 2 (2013), Jai Ho (2014), Dishkiyaoon (2014), Hero (2015) and Bajirao Mastani (2015).

== Controversies ==
=== Physical assault ===
In 2016, after a decade-long trial, a local metropolitan court in Mumbai found Aditya Pancholi guilty of assaulting a business associate in a fit of rage in 2005, and sentenced him to a one-year imprisonment with a fine of Rs. 20,000/- (US$300). Pancholi appealed against the judgment in a higher court.In 2025, A sessions court in Mumbai spared him from serving in jail but ordered him to pay a fine of 1.5 lakh rupees.

=== Sexual violences ===
In 2019, actress Kangana Ranaut, who had previously been in a relationship with him, filed a police complaint claiming that Pancholi had drugged, raped, assaulted and blackmailed her for sex repeatedly over a prolonged period starting in 2003. She repeated these claims in an interview to Aap ki Adalat on India TV and cited an incident of assault which had occurred in public. Eyewitnesses to the incident say that Pancholi stopped the rickshaw in which Ranaut was travelling, compelled her to get out of the vehicle and slapped her face. Pancholi stated in his defence that the accusations was false and as despicable as her entire relationship with him. He said that in fact, Ranaut had exploited him both financially and emotionally in a calculated manner and used his influence to secure a foothold for herself as an actress. The trial is yet to begin. Aditya Pancholi was previously accused of raping the 15-year-old maid of his then girlfriend Pooja Bedi. Although some claims suggest he was found guilty, there is no publicly available evidence to support this. No legal case records, conviction, or prison sentence have been documented.

== Awards and nominations ==
Year	Award	Category	Film	Result
1998	Filmfare Awards	Best Performance in a Negative Role	Yess Boss	Nominated
1998	Zee Cine Awards	Best Performance in a Negative Role	Yess Boss	Nominated
2011	GIF Award	Best Performance in a Negative Role	Striker	Nominated
