= Sonu Walia =

Indian actress and model (born 1964)

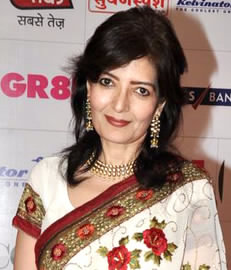
- Walia in 2013
- Born: Sanjeet Kaur Walia; 19 February 1964 (age 62); New Delhi, India
- Occupation: Actress
- Spouse: Surya Pratap Singh (m. 1995; death 2009)
- Awards: Filmfare Best Supporting Actress Award for Khoon Bhari Maang (1988)

Sonu Walia (born Sanjeet Kaur Walia) is an Indian former actress, model and beauty pageant titleholder who won the Femina Miss India Universe 1985. She is best known for her role in the film Khoon Bhari Maang (1988) for which she won a Filmfare Award for Best Supporting Actress.

A psychology graduate and a student of journalism, Walia took up modelling and she entered the Femina Miss India contest winning the title and represented India at Miss Universe 1985.

== Career ==
Walia won the Miss India contest in 1985 and went to compete in Miss Universe 1985.

== Personal life ==
Walia was born into a Sikh Punjabi Family. Walia was married to Surya Pratap Singh, an NRI based in the US who was a hotelier and Indian film producer. He died in 2009.

== Filmography ==
=== Films ===
| Year | Title | Role | Notes |
|---|---|---|---|
| 1986 | Shart | Model | |
| 1988 | Khoon Bhari Maang | Nandini | Filmfare Award for Best Supporting Actress |
| 1988 | Akarshan | Priya Khanna | |
| 1989 | Apna Desh Paraye Log | Neeta Das | |
| 1989 | Mahaadev | Dancer | |
| 1989 | Toofan | Herself | |
| 1989 | Clerk | Sonu | |
| 1990 | Maha-Sangram | Neelam | |
| 1990 | Tejaa | Heena | |
| 1990 | Haatim Tai | Sayira | |
| 1990 | Agneekaal | Mary D'Souza | |
| 1991 | Numbri Aadmi | Paro | |
| 1991 | Khel | Tara Jaisingh | |
| 1991 | Haque | Alpana - Swami's daughter | |
| 1991 | Pratikar | Uma Singh | |
| 1991 | Thalapathi | Dancer | Tamil film; Special appearance in the song "Rakkamma Kaiya Thattu" |
| 1991 | Swarg Jaisaa Ghar | Devki | |
| 1991 | Rupaye Dus Karod | | |
| 1991 | Jeevan Daata | Priya Singh (Shivram's daughter) | |
| 1992 | Tahalka | Jenny D'Costa | |
| 1992 | Dil Aashna Hai | Salma A. Baig | |
| 1992 | Nishchaiy | Parvati | |
| 1993 | Sahibaan | Rajkumari Razee | |
| 1994 | Mahakshathriya | | Kannada film |
| 1994 | Anari Dada | | |
| 1995 | Jallaad | | |
| 1995 | Fauji | Lajwanti ("Lajjo") | |
| 1995 | Alibaba Adbhutadweepam | Special appearance in a song | Telugu film |
| 1996 | Yash | Mrs. Kalpana Rai | |
| 1998 | Sarbans Dani Guru Gobind Singh | Begam Sahiba | |
| 2001 | Kasam | Bijlee | |
| 2005 | Suryakaant | | |
| 2008 | Jai Maa Sherawaali | Devi Maa Sherawaali | Credited as Sonu Pratap Walia |

=== Television ===
| Year | Series | Role | Notes |
|---|---|---|---|
| 1997 | Mahabharat Katha | Chitrangada | |

| Preceded by Juhi Chawla | Miss India; 1985 | Succeeded by Mehr Jesia |
