= Kajol filmography =

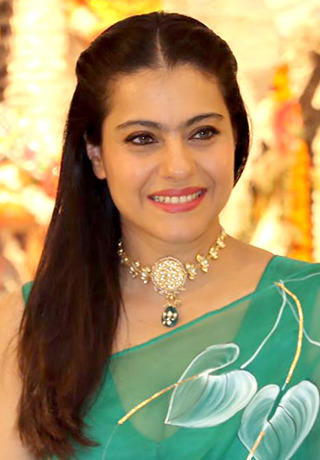
Kajol in 2021

Kajol is an Indian actress who is known for her work in Hindi films. She made her screen debut in the 1992 film Bekhudi. She was noted for her performance and went on to sign the 1993 commercially successful thriller Baazigar opposite Shah Rukh Khan. She starred in the 1994 film Udhaar Ki Zindagi, which earned her critical acclaim. This was followed by a role in Yeh Dillagi alongside Akshay Kumar and Saif Ali Khan. Kajol featured in five films in 1995. She appeared briefly in the thriller Karan Arjun, and played Simran, an NRI in Aditya Chopra’s romance Dilwale Dulhania Le Jayenge, both of which ranked among the highest-grossing Bollywood films of the year, and the success of the latter established her career in Bollywood. As of 2021, Dilwale Dulhania Le Jayenge is the longest-running Indian film. (Note: As of December 2014, the film is playing at the Maratha Mandir theatre in Mumbai for 1000 weeks.) Also in 1995, she appeared in the box-office flops Hulchul and Gundaraj. Her only screen appearance of 1996 was in Bambai Ka Babu, a financial failure.

In 1997, Kajol featured in the film Minsara Kanavu, her first Tamil feature. She played an obsessive lover in the mystery film Gupt (1997), and became the first woman to win the Filmfare Award for Best Performance in a Negative Role. Later in 1997, she featured as a poor girl in the romantic film Ishq, a box-office hit. In 1998, she played the leading lady in three romantic comedies, which were among the top-grossing Bollywood productions of the year — Pyaar Kiya To Darna Kya, Pyaar To Hona Hi Tha, and Kuch Kuch Hota Hai. Also in 1998, she played dual roles in the drama Dushman. The following year, she played the secret lover of Ajay Devgn's character in Dil Kya Kare and starred in the commercially successful film Hum Aapke Dil Mein Rehte Hain opposite Anil Kapoor. Following this, she starred in the films Raju Chacha (2000) and Kuch Khatti Kuch Meethi (2001), both of which performed poorly at the box-office.

Kajol played opposite Khan in Karan Johar's ensemble melodrama Kabhi Khushi Kabhie Gham (2001), which became the highest-grossing Bollywood film in overseas to that point. After a five-year absence from film, Kajol played a blind Kashmiri girl in the romantic thriller Fanaa (2006) opposite Aamir Khan. The film, which was based on terrorism, was a commercial success. Two years later, she featured as a talent judge for the television dance and singing reality show Rock-N-Roll Family. Later that year, she was paired with her husband Ajay Devgn in the romantic comedy U Me Aur Hum (2008). In the film, Kajol played an Alzheimer's patient. In 2010, she reunited with Khan and Johar in the drama My Name Is Khan, in which she played an Indian-American Hindu married to a Muslim man. For the film, she won the Filmfare Award for Best Actress for a record tying fifth time. (Note: Having won the award previously for Dilwale Dulhania Le Jayenge, Kuch Kuch Hota Hai, Kabhi Khushi Kabhie Gham, and Fanaa, she is tied with her aunt Nutan in this category.) Her next appearance of the year was in the family drama We Are Family, an adaption of the 1998 Hollywood film Stepmom.

In 2015, after five years, she made her comeback with Rohit Shetty's Dilwale, one of the highest-grossing Bollywood films of all time. In 2017, she was seen in Soundarya Rajnikanth's film Velaiilla Pattadhari 2, which was a profitable venture. She played a single mother who gives up her career as an aspiring singer in Pradeep Sarkar's family drama, Helicopter Eela, which did not do well. After an absence in 2019, she starred in Tanhaji (2020), which was a major critical and commercial success. In 2021, she played a woman with a traumatic childhood in the Netflix family drama Tribhanga.

== Films ==
Key
†	Denotes films that have not yet been released

=== As actress ===
Year	Title (Note: The films are listed in order of release date.)	Role(s)	Language(s)	Notes	Ref.
1992	Bekhudi	Radhika	Hindi		
1993	Baazigar	Priya Chopra	Hindi		
1994	Yeh Dillagi	Sapna	Hindi		
1994	Udhaar Ki Zindagi	Sita	Hindi		
1995	Karan Arjun	Sonia Saxena	Hindi		
1995	Taaqat	Kavita	Hindi		
1995	Hulchul	Sharmili Sinha	Hindi		
1995	Gundaraj	Ritu	Hindi		
1995	Dilwale Dulhania Le Jayenge	Simran Singh	Hindi		
1996	Bambai Ka Babu	Neha	Hindi		
1997	Minsara Kanavu	Priya Amalraj	Tamil		
1997	Gupt	Isha Diwan	Hindi		
1997	Hameshaa	Rani Sharma/ Reshma (Note: Kajol performed dual roles in the film.)	Hindi		
1997	Ishq	Kajal Jindal	Hindi		
1998	Pyaar Kiya To Darna Kya	Muskaan Thakur	Hindi		
1998	Duplicate	Simran Singh	Hindi	Cameo appearance	
1998	Dushman	Naina/Sonia Sehgal	Hindi		
1998	Pyaar To Hona Hi Tha	Sanjana Patel	Hindi		
1998	Kuch Kuch Hota Hai	Anjali Sharma	Hindi		
1999	Dil Kya Kare	Nandita Rai	Hindi		
1999	Hum Aapke Dil Mein Rehte Hain	Megha Verma	Hindi		
1999	Hote Hote Pyar Ho Gaya	Pinky	Hindi		
2000	Raju Chacha	Sanjana Bakshi/ Anna	Hindi		
2001	Kuch Khatti Kuch Meethi	Sweety/Tina Khanna	Hindi		
2001	Kabhi Khushi Kabhie Gham	Anjali Sharma	Hindi		
2003	Kal Ho Naa Ho	Herself	Hindi	Special appearance in the song "Maahi Ve"	
2006	Fanaa	Zooni Ali Beg	Hindi	Also playback singer for song "Mere Haath Mein"	
2006	Kabhi Alvida Naa Kehna	Herself	Hindi	Special appearance in the song "Rock N Roll Soniye"	
2007	Om Shanti Om	Herself	Hindi	Special appearance in the song "Deewangi Deewangi"	
2008	U Me Aur Hum	Piya Mehra	Hindi		
2008	Haal-e-dil	Herself	Hindi	Special appearance in the song "Oye Hoye"	
2008	Rab Ne Bana Di Jodi	Nargis	Hindi	Special appearance in the song "Phir Milenge Chalte Chalte"	
2010	My Name Is Khan	Mandira Rathod Khan	Hindi		
2010	We Are Family	Maya	Hindi		
2010	Toonpur Ka Superhero	Priya Verma Kumar	Hindi	Animated film	
2012	Student of the Year	Herself	Hindi	Special appearance in the song "Disco Deewane"	
2015	Dilwale	Meera Malik	Hindi		
2017	Velaiilla Pattadhari 2	Vasundhara Parameshwar	Tamil		
2018	Helicopter Eela	Eela Raiturkar	Hindi		
2018	Zero	Herself	Hindi	Cameo appearance	
2020	Tanhaji	Savitri Bai	Hindi		
2020	Devi	Jyoti	Hindi	Short film	
2021	Tribhanga	Anuradha Apte	Hindi		
2022	Salaam Venky	Kolavennu Sujata Krishnan	Hindi		
2023	Lust Stories 2	Devyani Singh	Hindi	Segment: "Tilchatta"	
2024	Do Patti	Vidya Jyothi Kanwar	Hindi		
2025	Maa	Ambika Dasgupta	Hindi		
2025	Sarzameen	Meher Menon	Hindi		
TBA	Maharagni: Queen of Queens †	Maya	Hindi		

=== As voice actor ===
Kajol filmography
Year	Film	character	Dubbed Language	Original Language	Ref.
1999	Taal	Announcer	Hindi	Hindi	
2012	Eega	Mother	Hindi	Telugu	
2018	Incredibles 2	Elastigirl	Hindi	English	

== Television ==
Kajol in TV Series
Year	Title	Role	Languages	Ref.
2008	Rock-N-Roll Family	Judge	Hindi	
2023–present	The Trial	Noyonika Sengupta	Hindi	
2025	Two Much with Kajol and Twinkle	Host	Hindi	

== See also ==
- List of awards and nominations received by Kajol
