= List of awards and nominations received by Kajol =

Kajol awards and nominations
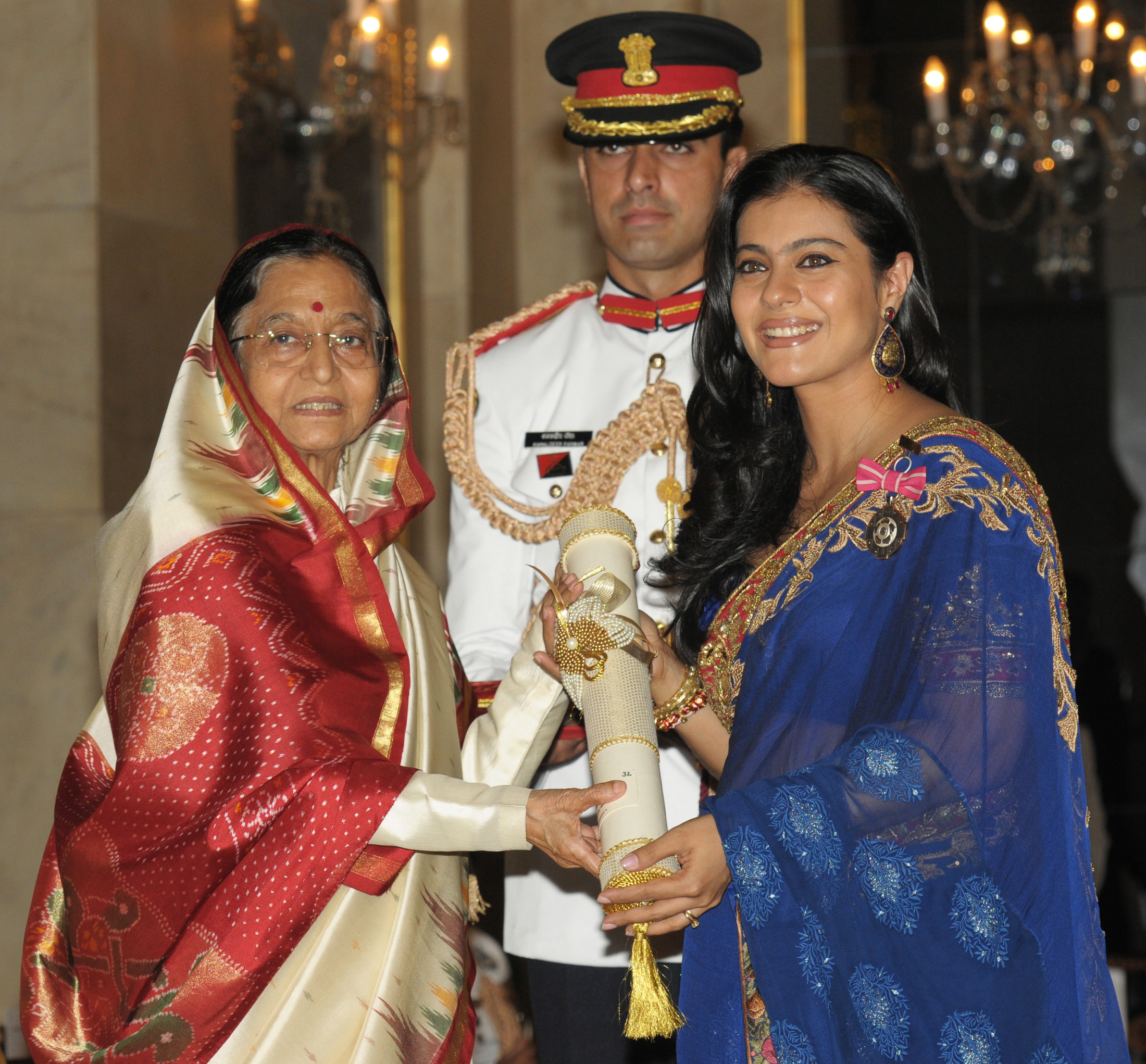
- Kajol in 2011
Awards and nominations
| Award | Wins | Nominations |
| Padma Shri | 1 | - |
| Filmfare Awards | 6 | 13 |
| Bollywood Movie Awards | 2 | 3 |
| Screen Awards | 5 | 14 |
| Zee Cine Awards | 4 | 13 |
| Bengal Film Journalists' Association Awards | 1 | 1 |
| Stardust Awards | 1 | 3 |
| Star Guild Awards | 0 | 1 |
| IIFA Awards | 0 | 3 |
| Bollywood Movie Awards | 2 | 3 |
| BIG Star Entertainment Awards | 0 | 2 |
| Filmfare OTT Awards | 0 | 1 |

Totals (Note: Certain award groups do not simply award one winner. They acknowledge several different recipients, have runners-up, and have third place. Since this is a specific recognition and is different from losing an award, runner-up mentions are considered wins in this award tally. For simplification and to avoid errors, each award in this list has been presumed to have had a prior nomination.)
- Wins: 54
- Nominations: 92

Kajol is an Indian actress known for her work in Hindi films. She is a recipient of more than 40 accolades into her credit. Six Filmfare Awards, one Best Performance in a Negative Role for Gupt: The Hidden Truth and record-tying five Best Actress for the romance musicals Dilwale Dulhania Le Jayenge, Kuch Kuch Hota Hai, the family drama Kabhi Khushi Kabhie Gham, the tragedy romantic thriller Fanaa and the social drama My Name Is Khan. In addition to seven nominations. She has received five Screen Awards, four Zee Cine Awards, two Bollywood Movie Award, and one each Stardust Award and Bengal Film Journalists' Association Awards.

Kajol made her acting debut with Bekhudi (1992), and had commercial successes in Baazigar (1993), and Yeh Dillagi (1994). Starring roles in the top-grossing romances Dilwale Dulhania Le Jayenge (1995) and Kuch Kuch Hota Hai (1998) established her as a leading star in the 1990s and earned her two Filmfare Awards for Best Actress. After making her debut in 1992 with the romance Bekhudi, Kajol received critical acclaim and the Bengal Film Journalists' Association Award for Best Actress for playing an orphaned girl in Udhaar Ki Zindagi (1994). She won her first Filmfare Award for Best Actress for her portrayal of an Indian non-resident in the romantic drama Dilwale Dulhania Le Jayenge (1995), and Best Performance in a Negative Role for her performance as a femme fatale in the psychological thriller Gupt: The Hidden Truth (1997), becoming the first actress to win in the latter category. Additionally, she received the Zee Cine Award for Best Actor – Female for Gupt.

Kajol was nominated for Best Actress at Filmfare for her 1998 films: Dushman, Pyaar To Hona Hi Tha and Kuch Kuch Hota Hai, winning the award for the lattermost. Her performance as twin sisters in Dushman also won her a first Screen Award for Best Actress, while for her portrayal of a tomboy in Kuch Kuch Hota Hai she earned Best Actress trophies for Bollywood Movie and Zee Cine Awards. Kajol set the record for most Filmfare Award for Best Actress wins with five after earning the trophies for her performances as a spirited Punjabi girl in Kabhi Khushi Kabhie Gham (2001), a blind Kashmiri woman in Fanaa (2006), and a career woman in My Name Is Khan (2010).

Along with acting awards, Kajol was honoured with the Rajiv Gandhi Award for her contribution to Indian cinema in 2002. In 2007, she received Karamveer Puraskar, presented by the Mumbai Pradesh Youth Congress, for her social work of helping the education of unpriveleged children. She was fetched the Padma Shri, the fourth highest civilian award, by the government of India in 2011.

== Awards and nominations ==
Awards and nominations received by Kajol
| Award | Year | Category | Nominated work | Result | Ref(s) |
|---|---|---|---|---|---|
| Bengal Film Journalists' Association Awards | 1995 | Best Actress (Hindi) | Udhaar Ki Zindagi | Won | |
| BIG Star Entertainment Awards | 2011 | Film Actor of the Decade – Female | — | Nominated | |
| BIG Star Entertainment Awards | 2011 | Most Entertaining Film Actor – Female | My Name Is Khan | Nominated | |
| Bollywood Movie Awards | 1999 | Best Actress | Kuch Kuch Hota Hai | Won | |
| Bollywood Movie Awards | 2002 | Best Actress | Kabhi Khushi Kabhie Gham | Won | |
| Bollywood Movie Awards | 2007 | Best Actress | Fanaa | Nominated | |
| Filmfare Awards | 1995 | Best Actress | Yeh Dillagi | Nominated | |
| Filmfare Awards | 1996 | Best Actress | Dilwale Dulhania Le Jayenge | Won | |
| Filmfare Awards | 1998 | Best Villain | Gupt: The Hidden Truth | Won | |
| Filmfare Awards | 1999 | Best Actress | Kuch Kuch Hota Hai | Won | |
| Filmfare Awards | 1999 | Best Actress | Dushman | Nominated | |
| Filmfare Awards | 1999 | Best Actress | Pyaar To Hona Hi Tha | Nominated | |
| Filmfare Awards | 2000 | Best Actress | Hum Aapke Dil Mein Rehte Hain | Nominated | |
| Filmfare Awards | 2002 | Best Actress | Kabhi Khushi Kabhie Gham | Won | |
| Filmfare Awards | 2007 | Best Actress | Fanaa | Won | |
| Filmfare Awards | 2009 | Best Actress | U Me Aur Hum | Nominated | |
| Filmfare Awards | 2011 | Best Actress | My Name Is Khan | Won | |
| Filmfare Awards | 2016 | Best Actress | Dilwale | Nominated | |
| Filmfare Awards | 2023 | Best Actress | Salaam Venky | Nominated | |
| Filmfare OTT Awards | 2021 | Best Actress (Web Original Film) | Tribhanga | Nominated | |
| Global Indian Film Awards | 2006 | Best Actress | Fanaa | Nominated | |
| International Indian Film Academy Awards | 2000 | Best Actress | Hum Aapke Dil Mein Rehte Hain | Nominated | |
| International Indian Film Academy Awards | 2002 | Best Actress | Kabhi Khushi Kabhie Gham | Nominated | |
| International Indian Film Academy Awards | 2007 | Best Actress | Fanaa | Nominated | |
| Pinkvilla Style Icons Awards | 2023 | Timeless Style Icon | —N/a | Won | |
| Producers Guild Film Awards | 2011 | Best Actress in a Leading Role | My Name Is Khan | Nominated | |
| Screen Awards | 1999 | Best Actress | Dushman | Won | |
| Screen Awards | 1999 | Best Actress | Kuch Kuch Hota Hai | Nominated | |
| Screen Awards | 2000 | Best Actress | Hum Aapke Dil Mein Rehte Hain | Nominated | |
| Screen Awards | 2000 | Best Supporting Actress | Dil Kya Kare | Nominated | |
| Screen Awards | 2002 | Best Actress | Kabhi Khushi Kabhie Gham | Won | |
| Screen Awards | 2002 | Jodi No. 1 (along with Shah Rukh Khan) | Kabhi Khushi Kabhie Gham | Won | |
| Screen Awards | 2007 | Best Actress | Fanaa | Nominated | |
| Screen Awards | 2007 | Jodi No. 1 (along with Aamir Khan) | Fanaa | Nominated | |
| Screen Awards | 2009 | Best Actress | U Me Aur Hum | Nominated | |
| Screen Awards | 2009 | Best Actress (Popular Choice) | U Me Aur Hum | Nominated | |
| Screen Awards | 2010 | Best Jodi of the Decade (along with Shah Rukh Khan) | — | Won | |
| Screen Awards | 2011 | Best Actress | My Name Is Khan | Nominated | |
| Screen Awards | 2015 | Best Film (Marathi) | Vitti Dandu | Won | |
| Screen Awards | 2016 | Jodi No. 1 (along with Shah Rukh Khan) | Dilwale | Won | |
| Stardust Awards | 2007 | Actor of the Year – Female | Fanaa | Nominated | |
| Stardust Awards | 2011 | Actor of the Year – Female | My Name Is Khan | Won | |
| Stardust Awards | 2011 | Best Actress in a Drama | My Name Is Khan and We Are Family | Nominated | |
| Zee Cine Awards | 1998 | Best Performance in a Negative Role | Gupt: The Hidden Truth | Won | |
| Zee Cine Awards | 1998 | Best Actor – Female | Gupt: The Hidden Truth | Nominated | |
| Zee Cine Awards | 1998 | Best Actor in a Supporting Role – Female | Ishq | Nominated | |
| Zee Cine Awards | 1999 | Best Actor – Female | Kuch Kuch Hota Hai | Won | |
| Zee Cine Awards | 1999 | Best Actor – Female | Dushman | Nominated | |
| Zee Cine Awards | 1999 | Best Actor – Female | Pyaar Kiya To Darna Kya | Nominated | |
| Zee Cine Awards | 2000 | Best Actor – Female | Dil Kya Kare | Nominated | |
| Zee Cine Awards | 2000 | Best Actor – Female | Hum Aapke Dil Mein Rehte Hain | Nominated | |
| Zee Cine Awards | 2002 | Outstanding Performance – Female | Kabhi Khushi Kabhie Gham | Won | |
| Zee Cine Awards | 2002 | Best Actor – Female | Kabhi Khushi Kabhie Gham | Nominated | |
| Zee Cine Awards | 2007 | Best Actor – Female | Fanaa | Won | |
| Zee Cine Awards | 2011 | Best Actor – Female | My Name Is Khan | Nominated | |
| Zee Cine Awards | 2011 | International Female Icon | — | Nominated | |

== State honours ==
| Country or organization | Year | Award | Ref(s) |
|---|---|---|---|
| Mumbai Pradesh Youth Congress | 2002 | Rajiv Gandhi Award | |
| iCONGO | 2007 | Karamveer Puraskar | |
| India | 2011 | Padma Shri | |
| Maharashtra State Film Awards | 2025 | Raj Kapoor Special Contribution Award | |
