= Victoria No. 203 =

Victoria No. 203 may refer to:

- Victoria No. 203 (1972 film), an Indian Hindi-language heist comedy film
- Victoria No. 203 (2007 film), an Indian Hindi-language heist comedy thriller film, a remake of the above
