= U Me Aur Hum =

2008 Indian film by Ajay Devgn

- Theatrical-release poster
- Directed by: Ajay Devgn
- Written by: Screenplay: Robin Bhatt; Sutanu Gupta; Akash Khurana; Dialogues: Ashwni Dhir
- Story by: Ajay Devgn
- Produced by: Ajay Devgn; Kumar Mangat Pathak
- Starring: Ajay Devgn; Kajol
- Cinematography: Aseem Bajaj
- Edited by: Dharmendra Sharma
- Music by: Songs: Vishal Bhardwaj; Score: Monty Sharma
- Production company: Devgan Films
- Distributed by: Eros International
- Release date: 11 April 2008
- Running time: 156 minutes
- Country: India
- Language: Hindi
- Budget: ₹ 25 crore
- Box office: ₹ 40.02 crore

U Me Aur Hum (transl. You, Me, and Us) is a 2008 Indian Hindi-language romantic drama film co-written, directed, and produced by Ajay Devgn. The film tells the story of Ajay (Devgn), who meets barmaid Piya (Kajol) on a cruise with his friends (Sumeet Raghavan, Divya Dutta, Karan Khanna, and Isha Sharvani). They fall in love and marry; a few months later, Piya is diagnosed with Alzheimer's disease.

The film was announced in May 2007 and was the directorial debut of Devgn, who had long wanted to direct a film. He wrote the story, and the screenplay was written by Robin Bhatt, Sutanu Gupta, and Akash Khurana. Principal photography, by Aseem Bajaj, began in India shortly after the film was announced. It was edited by Dharmendra Sharma, and the background score was written by Monty Sharma. The soundtrack was composed by Vishal Bhardwaj, with lyrics by Munna Dhiman.

U Me Aur Hum was released on 11 April 2008. Made on a budget of ₹220 million (US$2.3 million), it grossed ₹400.2 million (US$4.2 million) worldwide. Critical response to the film was mixed; its performances (particularly those of Devgn and Kajol) were praised, but Devgn's direction and the film's climax were criticized. U Me Aur Hum received several nominations, including Best Actress for Kajol at the Filmfare and Screen Awards.

== Plot ==
Ajay tells his son that he should admit his feelings to a girl he likes. His son replies that if Ajay can woo a woman he likes, he will follow his advice. Ajay approaches an older woman, and begins telling her a story. Those around them begin listening, and a flashback begins.

A younger Ajay is on a cruise with four friends: Nikhil and Reena (an unhappily-married couple) and Vicky and Natasha, who are happily unmarried. Ajay meets Piya, a waitress, at the ship's bar and falls in love with her. Tipsy, he buys drinks for everyone at the bar and blacks out. In the morning, Piya delivers the bill and Ajay says that he is still in love with her; she does not reciprocate his feelings. Ajay looks in her diary, where she wrote about her love of salsa dancing. He learns the dance, and Piya becomes interested in him. When she learns that Ajay had looked in her diary and she becomes angry. He leaves, giving Piya a paper with his phone number if she changes her mind.

At their new home, Ajay invites his friends to his house. He has tried to win Piya back by giving her whatever she wants, including a dog. His friends learn when they arrive that Piya and Ajay have gotten married, and are surprised and delighted. The newly married couple begins a wish list, which they write on their bedroom wall; the first entry is to go on a cruise on their 25th anniversary. Several months after they marry, Piya forgets everything (including where she lives) when she goes shopping. Diagnosed with Alzheimer's disease, she is also pregnant. Ajay must keep Piya from hurting the baby; her condition worsens, and he is forced to institutionalise her. However, his friends persuade him to bring her back home.

Ajay says that the best thing he has ever done was to bring Piya back home; it is a special day when she can remember things, and an extra-special day when she remembers him. The older woman turns out to be Piya, who is still enduring the symptoms and she and Ajay are celebrating their 25th anniversary on a cruise with their son.

== Cast ==
The cast is listed below:

- Ajay Devgn as Dr. Ajay Mehra
- Kajol as Piya Mehra, Ajay's wife
- Karan Khanna as Vicky
- Isha Sharvani as Natasha
- Sumeet Raghavan as Dr. Nikhil
- Divya Dutta as Dr. Reena
- Sachin Khedekar as Dr. Sachin Khurana
- Aditya Singh Rajput as Aman Mehra (cameo appearance)
- Anita Wahi as Mrs. Joshi
- Hazel Croney as the girlfriend of Ajay and Piya's son

== Production ==
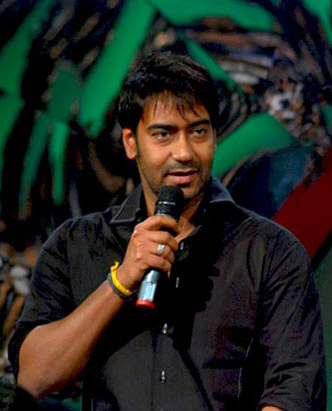
Ajay Devgn, who made his directorial debut in U Me Aur Hum, said that he had wanted to be a director since childhood.

In May 2007, the entertainment portal Bollywood Hungama reported that Ajay Devgn would make his directorial debut in a project which was later entitled U Me Aur Hum. Wanting to be a director since childhood, Devgn described directing as a passion that came to him "naturally". Addressing the issue of Alzheimer's disease, he had conceived the film three years before its release. Devgn produced the film under Ajay Devgn FFilms, in addition to writing the story and starring in it. The screenplay was written by Robin Bhatt, Sutanu Gupta, and Akash Khurana, and Ashwni Dhir polished the dialogue.

When Devgn told his wife Kajol about U Me Aur Hum, she immediately said that she wanted to star in it. It was their seventh collaboration, following the action films Hulchul (1995), Gundaraj (1995), and Raju Chacha (2000), the romantic comedies Ishq (1997) and Pyaar To Hona Hi Tha (1998), and the drama Dil Kya Kare (1999). Kajol played Piya, a waitress who develops Alzheimer's disease several months after her marriage to Ajay. She described her rapport with Devgn, saying that working with him was always a "new experience" because of his unpredictable behaviour. Devgn believed her involvement in the film made his work as director "much easier", describing the opportunity to collaborate once again with the actress. Model-turned-actor Aman Mehra makes a cameo appearance as their son.

Principal photography was completed by Aseem Bajaj and began at the Manoranjan Studio in Andheri, with Sameer Chandra as the production designer. The costumes were designed by Anna Singh except for Kajol's, which was by Manish Malhotra. Singh gave Devgn bright, sun-coloured clothes for the cruise scenes, and suits when he was a doctor at the hospital. Ashley Lobo and Ganesh Acharya were the choreographers, and Jay Sinagh Nijjar was the action director. Shooting moved to Filmistan from 5 to 25 May 2007, and the cruise scenes were filmed there. Editing and sound design were by Dharmendra Sharma and Rakesh Ranjan, respectively, after filming ended. Monty Sharma composed the background score.

== Soundtrack ==
U Me Aur Hum

Soundtrack album by Vishal Bhardwaj
- Released: 13 February 2008
- Genre: Feature-film soundtrack
- Length: 29:33
- Label: Eros Music
- Producer: Vishal Bhardwaj

Vishal Bhardwaj chronology
No Smoking (2007)	U Me Aur Hum (2008)	Kaminey (2009)

The soundtrack was composed by Vishal Bhardwaj, with lyrics by Munna Dhiman. Adnan Sami, Shreya Ghoshal, and Sunidhi Chauhan performed the vocals. The album was released by Eros Music on 13 February 2008. In a Bollywood Hungama review, Joginder Tuteja wrote that the singers had made their best effort and said about the title song: "It's a beautiful track that is as melodious as it gets and flows in a direction ..." Meghna Menon of Hindustan Times wrote that Bhardwaj had "once again hit the jackpot" with the film's soundtrack and commending Dhiman's unconventional lyrics. Raja Sen described it as an "innocent ... romantic and real, moody and modest" album. A reviewer for The Hindu said that the Latino feel of "Jee Le" made the song "racy".

Track listing
No.	Title	Singer(s)	Length
1.	"Jee Le"	Adnan Sami, Shreya Ghoshal	5:11
2.	"U Me Aur Hum" (Female)	Shreya Ghoshal	6:39
3.	"Saiyaan"	Sunidhi Chauhan	3:55
4.	"Phatte"	Adnan Sami, Shreya Ghoshal	5:32
5.	"Dil Dhakda Hai"	Adnan Sami, Shreya Ghoshal	4:13
6.	"U Me Aur Hum" (Male)	Adnan Sami	4:03
Total length:			29:33

== Release ==
U Me Aur Hum was one of 2008's most-anticipated Indian films; trade analysts hoped that it would be a commercial success, since all of Devgn and Kajol's collaborations had under-performed commercially, with the exception of Pyaar To Hona Hi Tha, which was a hit at the box office. A special screening was given by sitar virtuoso and composer Ravi Shankar for critic-turned-politician L. K. Advani on 6 April 2008 in the Films Division of India auditorium in Delhi, also attended by a cast member and Sushma Swaraj. Advani gave the film a standing ovation, and said he was impressed by it; Swaraj appreciated Kajol's performance. Distributed by Eros International, U Me Aur Hum was released theatrically on 11 April 2008 with Jaideep Sen's comedy thriller Krazzy 4. The film was released on DVD on 26 May as a single-disc pack in NTSC widescreen format. Since 30 November 2016, it has been available for streaming on Amazon Prime Video and Apple TV+.

Despite great expectations, U Me Aur Hum's commercial performance was poor. It was released on 450 screens (150 of which were on digital platforms), and grossed ₹22.1 million (US$230,000) on its opening day. The film earned ₹75.9 million (US$790,000) by the end of its first weekend, and ₹120.8 million (US$1.3 million) after one week. It earned a total of ₹289.6 million (US$3.0 million) in India. U Me Aur Hum proved to be more successful among overseas audiences, earning ₹70.3 million (US$730,000) after one week. The film grossed ₹110.6 million (US$1.1 million), the year's seventh-highest-grossing Indian film. Totaling its total worldwide gross, the film-trade website Box Office India estimated that it earned ₹400.2 million (equivalent to ₹1.1 billion or US$12 million in 2023) against a ₹220 million (equivalent to ₹610 million or US$6.4 million in 2023) budget.

== Critical reception ==
U Me Aur Hum had a mixed critical reception. Devgn's direction and the film's exposition were generally criticised, and its performances (particularly those of Devgn and Kajol), plot, and cinematography were universally praised. The film has a rating of 60 percent on the review aggregator website Rotten Tomatoes based on five reviews, with an average rating of 5.7 out of 10. Taran Adarsh of Bollywood Hungama wrote about the actors, "U Me Aur Hum is like a medal that glimmers on Ajay Devgan's body of work. He's exceptional! Kajol, well, what can you say of an actress who has proved herself time and again? That she's undoubtedly the best has been proved yet again." Adarsh described the film as "a well-made, absorbing love story that's high on the emotional quotient", noting that the screenplay was an Indian version of the 2004 American film The Notebook. Jaspreet Pandohar of the BBC called the film "a worthy but mushy watch"; Maitland McDonagh found its first half "dumb" and its second half "classic".

A Rediff.com reviewer gave U Me Aur Hum 3 1/2 stars, saying that Devgn had delivered a "fantastic" work by telling a "powerful" story without "resorting to that most traditional and painful of Bollywood cop-out methods, the flash-cuts". According to Rajeev Masand, "Well, to some extent, it’s the leads whose credible performances outshine the shoddy script. Ajay Devgan oozes sincerity as the conflicted husband, but it’s Kajol who is really the emotional anchor of the film, dazzling you with her spontaneity, pumping life and blood into her character, making Piya a portrait of internalized pain, something even the script fails to do." For Screen, Rajiv Vijayakar called Devgn and Kajol's performances "stupendous" and "terrific"; the film's direction and screenplay, however, were its "undoing". In his three-star review, Vijayakar said that the supporting cast (particularly Sumeet Raghavan and Divya Dutta) were "great" and "admirably restrained". Frank Lovece said that the film "is an emotionally affecting tragedy wonderfully acted by Western standards".

Ziya Us Salam noted Kajol's physical appearance as a young and old woman in U Me Aur Hum. He praised the latter ("sipping her coffee, her luminous eyes exuding rare brilliance"), and felt that Devgn's performance was overshadowed by hers. Sudhish Kamath of The Hindu agreed, saying that "Kajol revels in her role with an unforgettably electrifying performance". Questioning the film's originality, Kamath nonetheless praised Devgn: "As an actor, he's brilliant. As a filmmaker, even better. A fine example unfolds (again in the second half) when the doctor hands him his newborn and adds that he's not sure if the mother would even recognise the baby." The Economic Times' Gaurav Malini, who gave U Me Aur Hum three stars, commended both actors for playing to "perfection" and the film "raises much above the candyfloss or campus romance regularly churned out" in Bollywood. About Devgn's direction, Malini said that he "also succeeds in extracting authentic performances" from the rest of the cast.

Namrata Joshi of Outlook was ambivalent about the acting, criticising Kajol for being "terribly contained" and Devgn's "dreadful" effort to play a rakish, cool man, and said that only Raghavan and Dutta remained as a "good performer" in the film. In the Hindustan Times, Khalid Mohamed wrote: "For its tear-drawing emotional content, a splendid performance by Kajol and Devgan’s fluid makeover from an actor of steel to a director of tenderness, you ultimately take U Me Aur Hum home with you. Worth a cherish." Nikhat Kazmi of The Times of India wrote that Kajol's role "mirrors the vulnerability and the insecurity of a woman who lives life on the edge, threatening to fall off any day", and Baradwaj Rangan noted her "vacant" expression in her scenes as an old woman. In her Sify review, Sonia Chopra called Devgn's character "sketchy and not particularly likeable". She described the film as "Devgn's confident debut", adding, "... hopefully next time round, he'll choose to appease the audience’s mind as well, and not just aim for the heart."

== Accolades ==
Award	Category	Recipient(s) and nominee(s)	Result	Ref(s)
54th Filmfare Awards	Best Actress	Kajol	Nominated	
Screen Awards	Best Actress	Kajol	Nominated	
Screen Awards	Best Actress (Popular Choice)	Kajol	Nominated	
Stardust Awards	Hottest New Film	U Me Aur Hum	Nominated	
Stardust Awards	Breakthrough Performance – Male	Sumeet Raghavan	Nominated	
Stardust Awards	Best Supporting Actress	Divya Dutta	Nominated	
