= Nirmal Jani =

Indian cinematographer

Nirmal Jani is an Indian cinematographer who worked in Indian films.

== Filmography ==
- Patthar Ke Phool (1991)
- Kshatriya (1993)
- Dushmani: A Violent Love Story (1995)
- Sarhad: The Border of Crime (1995)
- Haqeeqat (1995)
- Border (1997)
- Dushman (1998)
- Pyaar To Hona Hi Tha (1998)
- Zakhm (1998)
- Hadh Kar Di Aapne (2000)
- Raju Chacha (2000)
- Kuch Khatti Kuch Meethi (2001)
- Kranti (2002)
- Tum Se Achcha Kaun Hai (2002)
- Sur: The Melody of Life (2002)
- Chori Chori (2003)
- Deewaar (2004)
- Blackmail (2005)
- Humko Tumse Pyaar Hai (2006)
- Hope and a Little Sugar (2006)
- Hattrick (2007)
- One Two Three (2008)
- Toonpur Ka Super Hero (2010)
