= Baaghi Sultana =

1993 Hindi action film by R. Thakur

Baaghi Sultana (English: Rebel) is a 1993 Hindi action film directed by R. Thakur. The film is produced by Raghunath Singh under the banner of Om Namah Shivay Productions. The star cast of the movie includes Anupam Kher, Kiron Kher, Shakti Kapoor, Puneet Issar, Raza Murad, Arif Khan, Vijay Saxena, Kirti Singh and Kiran Kumar. This film was released on 26 March 1993.

== Cast ==
Kirti Singh
Vijay Saxena	(as Vijay Kumar Saxena)
Vidyashree	as Sunita
Arif Khan	as Vikram
Puneet Issar	as Paras
Rajesh Puri	as Baldev Deshpande
	as Kunal
Jaya Mathur	as Asha
Yunus Parvez	as Mrityujay Saxena
Babau	as Tejeshwar
Raza Murad	as Prithvi
Shakti Kapoor	as Pratap
Kiran Kumar	as Gorakh Singh
Anupam Kher	as Vijay Singhal
Sripradha	as Alka (as Sree Prada)
Kishore Anand Bhanushali	Jwla Pratap
Balbir	(as Jr. Shatrugan Sinha)
Mahesh Kawal	
Jai Kanwar	as Sunil
Restam Thapa	as Chitra
Armaan Khan	Vishal
Ragan	Shiv
Mahesh Raj Soni	as Jatin Yadav
Surendra Dutt	as Ravi
Wazir Khan	Manish
Matesh Raj	as Lalit
Rajni Bala	as Anjali
Ved Goswami	as Damodar
Halwadas	as Narendra
Maha Shweta	as Arpita
