= Kajol =

Indian actress (born 1974)

Kajol Devgan
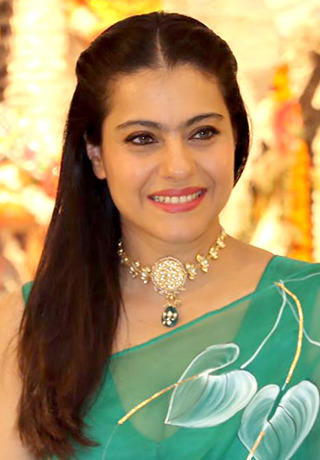
- Kajol in 2021
- Born: Kajol Mukherjee; 5 August 1974 (age 52); Bombay, Maharashtra, India
- Occupation: Actress
- Years active: 1992–present
- Works: Full list
- Spouse: Ajay Devgn (m. 1999)
- Children: 2
- Parents: Shomu Mukherjee (father); Tanuja Samarth (mother)
- Family: Mukherjee-Samarth family
- Awards: Full list
- Honours: Padma Shri (2011)

Kajol Devgan (née Mukherjee; born 5 August 1974), known mononymously as Kajol (Bengali: [ˈkadʒol]), is an Indian actress who appears in Hindi films. Described in the media as one of the most successful and versatile actresses of Hindi cinema, she is the recipient of numerous accolades, including seven Filmfare Awards. In 2011, Kajol received Padma Shri, the fourth-highest civilian award by the government of India.

The daughter of Tanuja and Shomu Mukherjee, Kajol made her acting debut with Bekhudi (1992) while still in school. She subsequently quit her studies and had commercial successes in Baazigar (1993) and Yeh Dillagi (1994). Starring roles in the top-grossing romances Dilwale Dulhania Le Jayenge (1995) and Kuch Kuch Hota Hai (1998) established her as a leading star in the 1990s, and earned her two Filmfare Awards for Best Actress. She also gained critical appreciation for playing a psychopathic killer in Gupt: The Hidden Truth (1997) and an avenger in Dushman (1998).

After starring in the family drama Kabhi Khushi Kabhie Gham (2001), which won her a third Filmfare Award, Kajol took a sabbatical from full-time acting and worked infrequently over the next decades. She won two more Best Actress awards at Filmfare for starring in the romantic thriller Fanaa (2006) and the drama My Name Is Khan (2010). Her highest-grossing releases came with the comedy Dilwale (2015) and the period film Tanhaji (2020). She has since starred in several streaming projects, including Tribhanga (2021) and The Trial (2023).

In addition to acting in films, Kajol is a social activist and noted for her work with widows and children. She has featured as a talent judge for the reality show Rock-N-Roll Family in 2008 and holds a managerial position at Devgn Entertainment and Software Ltd. Kajol has been married to actor and filmmaker Ajay Devgn since 1999, with whom she has two children.

== Early life and background ==
Kajol Mukherjee was born in Mumbai (then Bombay) on 5 August 1974. Her mother, Tanuja, is an actress, while her father, Shomu Mukherjee, was a film director and producer. Her younger sister, Tanishaa, is also an actress. Her maternal aunt was actress Nutan. Her maternal grandmother, Shobhna Samarth, and great-grandmother, Rattan Bai, were both involved in Hindi cinema. Her paternal uncles, Joy Mukherjee and Deb Mukherjee, were film actors, while her paternal and maternal grandfathers, Sashadhar Mukherjee and Kumarsen Samarth, respectively, were filmmakers. Kajol's cousins Rani Mukerji, Sharbani Mukherjee, and Mohnish Bahl are also actors; whereas Ayan Mukerji is a director.

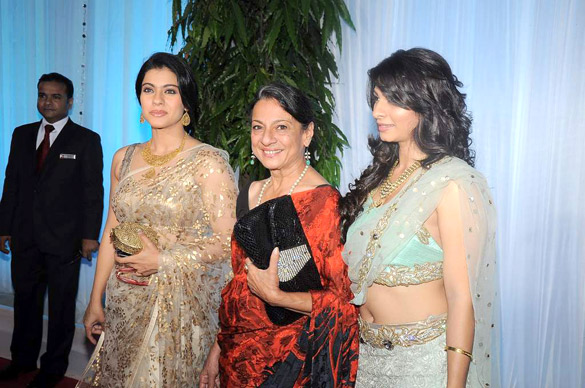
Kajol with her mother Tanuja (centre) and sister Tanishaa (right) at actress Esha Deol's wedding reception in 2012: Kajol said that Tanuja was her inspiration to be an actress.

Kajol describes herself as being mischievous, stubborn, and impulsive at a young age. Her parents separated when she was young, but Kajol was unaffected by it, since the matter was never discussed at home. Kajol was looked after by her maternal grandmother, who "never let me feel that my mother was away and working". According to Kajol, her mother inculcated a sense of independence in her since she was young. Growing up between two separate cultures, she inherited her "Maharashtrian pragmatism" from her mother and her "Bengali temperament" from her father. As part of tradition, along with the Mukherjee family, Kajol, a practising Hindu, celebrates the Durga Puja festival in the suburban neighbourhood of Santacruz annually.

Kajol was educated at St. Joseph's Convent School, Panchgani. Apart from her studies, she participated in extracurricular activities, such as dancing. In school, she began to form an active interest in reading fiction, as it helped her "through the bad moments" in her life. In the early 1990s, Tanuja tried to direct a film to launch her as an actress, but it was shelved after a few days of shooting. At 16, Kajol began work on Bekhudi, which according to her was a "big dose of luck"; she was cast by him when she visited the studio of photographer Gautam Rajadhyaksha, who also wrote the film's screenplay. She intended to return to school after shooting during her two-months summer vacation, but she eventually dropped out to pursue a full-time career in film—though she later regretted the decision.

== Film career ==
=== Early work (1992–1994) ===
Kajol made her acting debut at age 17 in the 1992 romantic drama Bekhudi alongside another debutant, Kamal Sadanah, and her mother Tanuja. Kajol played Radhika, who falls in love with Sadanah's character against her parents' disapproval. The film turned out to be a box office flop, but Kajol's performance gained positive notice. The following year, she was cast in Abbas–Mustan's crime thriller Baazigar (1993), the fourth-highest-grossing film of the year with revenues of ₹182.5 million (US$1.9 million). Co-starring Shah Rukh Khan and Shilpa Shetty, the film had Kajol in the role of Priya Chopra, a young woman who falls in love with her sister's murderer, unaware of his identity. Kajol's performance in the film drew critical attention.

In 1994, Kajol appeared in Udhaar Ki Zindagi as an orphaned girl who visits her estranged grandparents (Jeetendra and Moushumi Chatterjee). It failed to do well at the box office, however, Kajol was named the Best Actress (Hindi) by the Bengal Film Journalists' Association. The film was an emotionally draining experience for Kajol, and she later maintained that it had affected her so deeply that after shooting ended, she was on the verge of a crisis. Consequently, she made a deliberate decision to sign up for lighter films in which she would have roles of minimal importance and no intense dramatic efforts, including Hulchul, Gundaraj, and Karan Arjun—all released a year later.

She gained wider public recognition for her role in Yeh Dillagi, a romance produced by Yash Raj Films and based on the 1953 American play Sabrina Fair. She starred as Sapna, a chauffeur's daughter, who becomes a model and catches the interest of the two sons of her father's employers (Akshay Kumar and Saif Ali Khan). A financial success, Yeh Dillagi proved to be a breakthrough for Kajol, earning her a first Best Actress nomination at the annual Filmfare Awards. The Indian Express took note of her believable performance, and Screen concluded that Yeh Dillagi had changed her screen persona from a girl next door to a beauty extraordinaire.

=== Established actress (1995–1998) ===
In 1995, Kajol had two major commercial successes: Karan Arjun and Dilwale Dulhania Le Jayenge. The former is an action film by Rakesh Roshan, based on the concept of reincarnation, and it offered her the small part of Sonia Saxena Singh. She explained her minor role in the film, saying that she wanted to be in an ornamental role and admitting she had nothing to do in the film except be glamorous. The film emerged as the second-highest-grossing film of the year in India. Kajol's next releases—Taaqat, Hulchul and Gundaraj—underperformed at the box office; the latter two were her earliest collaborations with her future-husband, Ajay Devgn, and trade analysts linked the failure to their chemistry.

In Dilwale Dulhania Le Jayenge, Kajol's final 1995 release, Shah Rukh Khan and she starred as nonresident Indians from London who fall in love during a trip across Europe and reunite in India to persuade her conservative father to call off her upcoming arranged marriage. Kajol spoke of her attachment to the project and her full emotional involvement with her character, Simran. One of the most successful films of all-time in India, it has been continuously running in Mumbai and, having surpassed 1000 weeks of screening in 2014, became the longest-running Indian film ever. Equally popular with critics, the film earned ten Filmfare Awards, including a first Best Actress for Kajol. It has been voted one of the best films ever made in polls by the British Film Institute. Raja Sen from Rediff.com thought Kajol was well-cast as Simran, arguing that "the real-as-life actress bringing warmth and credulity to the initially prudish and reluctant Simran". 1996 saw her in the poorly received action film Bambai Ka Babu.

In 1997, Kajol's portrayal of Isha Diwan, an obsessive lover turned psychopathic serial killer, in Gupt: The Hidden Truth, was labelled by critics a turning point. The director, Rajiv Rai, said that he "tapped the versatile artistry in Kajol", commending her for the finesse she brought to the part. The suspense thriller, also starring Bobby Deol and Manisha Koirala, was a mainstream success. India Today noted Kajol for outpacing her co-stars, and The Times of India wrote in 2016 that she was "probably the first to have broken her goody-two-shoes image". In 2002, Rediff.com included her performance in its listing of best villain performances. Kajol eventually became the first female actor to be nominated for and win the Filmfare Award for Best Performance in a Negative Role. In later years, Kajol said she accepted the part to avoid typecasting and expressed her desire to play more roles of the type.

Following a leading role in the reincarnation-based film Hameshaa, Kajol replaced Madhuri Dixit to play the lead opposite Prabhu Deva and Arvind Swamy in Rajiv Menon's Tamil-language romantic musical Minsara Kanavu. Kajol found dancing alongside Deva (himself a dance choreographer) difficult and she needed dozens of retakes and rehearsals to get the steps right. She played Priya Amalraj, a convent student who aspires to become a nun, and her voice was dubbed by actress Revathi. The Indian Express reviewed: "Kajol is full of beans and fits into her character with commendable ease. Hers is perhaps one of the most expressive faces of the present". While the original version was embraced by audiences, the Hindi-dubbed version of the film (titled Sapnay) performed averagely. Her next release was Indra Kumar's comedy-drama Ishq, alongside Aamir Khan, Juhi Chawla and Ajay Devgn. A commercial success, the film won critical praise for the performances of the four leads.

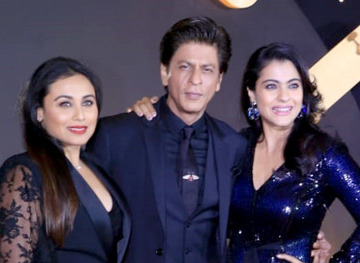
Kajol with Rani Mukerji (left) and Shah Rukh Khan at an event for Kuch Kuch Hota Hai in 2018

In 1998, Kajol reinforced her status as a leading actress of Hindi cinema by featuring in the three highest-grossing productions of the year: Pyaar Kiya To Darna Kya, Pyaar To Hona Hi Tha and Kuch Kuch Hota Hai; all of which were nominated for the Filmfare Award for Best Film, with the lattermost winning it. Pyaar Kiya To Darna Kya, where she played a naïve village girl, released first and won her positive feedback. She next played twin sisters, Sonia and Naina, in Dushman. Revolving around Naina's quest to avenge the murder of Sonia, the film saw Kajol in one of her best-reviewed performances. Having initially refused the offer due to her lack of comfort shooting the rape scene, she finally accepted it on the condition that a body-double be used in it. The film won her the Screen Award for Best Actress. Suparn Verma noted her for being in "superb form" in both roles.

Anees Bazmee's romantic comedy Pyaar To Hona Hi Tha, a remake of the 1995 American film French Kiss, followed. She played the comic role of Sanjana, a clumsy woman, who travels from Paris to India in search of her philandering fiancé, but falls for another man (Ajay Devgn). The film became a hit and fetched Kajol another Best Actress nomination at Filmfare that year. Deepa Deosthalee from The Indian Express called Pyaar To Hona Hi Tha "Kajol's film all the way" and commended her presence that made the film to be worth-watching; Khalid Mohamed referred to her as "the show's super-saving grace. Bubbly and spontaneous as ever, hers is a perfectly balanced performance, rescuing even the loudest scenes from going over the top."

The biggest success of 1998 for Kajol was her final release of that year, Karan Johar's directorial debut, Kuch Kuch Hota Hai. The first Indian feature to be shot in Scotland, it emerged as an all-time blockbuster in both India and overseas. Kajol played Anjali Sharma, a tomboyish college student who is secretly in love with her best friend from college (Shah Rukh Khan). The story follows their renewed encounter years later when he is widowed and she has transformed her appearance and is already engaged to marry someone else. Critics considered Kajol's performance bold and convincing, despite an otherwise unrealistic plot. Nikhat Kazmi wrote that she is "almost mesmeric" in the part. She won her second Best Actress award at the 44th Filmfare Awards and first Zee Cine Award for Best Actor – Female for her work. Filmfare included Kajol's performances in both Dushman and Kuch Kuch Hota Hai in its listing of Indian cinema's "80 Most Iconic performances". In a year-end column, The Tribune's Madhur Mittal reported that Kajol had "emerged as the consummate heroine with her excellent emoting and sensational screen presence in each portrayal".

=== Decrease in workload (1999–2005) ===
Journalists speculated that the supporting role of the other woman of Ajay Devgn's character in Dil Kya Kare, Kajol's first release after marriage, would be "the acid test" for her. She explained that she accepted the role solely "because it had shades of grey". The film met with largely negative reviews, though Deccan Herald noted her for playing the role with finesse. Commercially too, the film failed to do well. The drama Hum Aapke Dil Mein Rehte Hain, on the other hand, performed well with critics and audiences. Co-starring Anil Kapoor, it gave her experience with "the stereotypical, sacrificing woman role" and earned her another Best Actress Filmfare nomination. The film generated media coverage for being one of the few woman-centered films to attract viewers in Indian cinemas. Her final release of the year was Hote Hote Pyar Ho Gaya. The Hindustan Times noted her chemistry with Jackie Shroff but wrote off the film.

The following year, Kajol and her husband starred together in his home-production Raju Chacha, whose plot revolves on the love story between a conman and a governess of three children belonging to a wealthy family. The children's film, with a production cost of ₹300 million (US$3.2 million), was declared as among the most expensive Hindi films at the time. Dinesh Raheja wrote of the lack of imagination in the script, which affected the chemistry between Kajol and Ajay Devgn. In Rahul Rawail's Kuch Khatti Kuch Meethi (2001) Kajol played twin sisters who are separated at birth. The film was poorly reviewed as was Kajol's dual role, dismissed as "a double bore". Roshmila Bhattacharya from Screen defended Kajol's presence and her energetic performance. Both Raju Chacha and Kuch Khatti Kuch Meethi were flops at the box office.

Later that year, Kajol played a leading role in Karan Johar's ensemble drama Kabhi Khushi Kabhie Gham, which was the top-grossing Indian production of all-time in the overseas market. She played Anjali Sharma, a young Punjabi woman from the Chandni Chowk area who falls for a wealthy man. She identified herself with the character's noisy nature and found similarities between it and that of Hema Malini in Sholay (1975). The role required Kajol to speak in Punjabi, a language she was not fluent in, and although she struggled at first to master it, she achieved the pronunciation and diction with the help of producer Yash Johar and some of the crew members. Her comic-dramatic performance and Punjabi dialect met with critical acclaim and won her a third Filmfare Award in the Best Actress category. Ziya Us Salam, in a review for The Hindu, asserted: "Kajol steals the thunder from under very high noses indeed. With her precise timing and subtle lingering expression, she is a delight all the way."

Following Kabhi Khushi Kabhie Gham, Kajol took a sabbatical from full-time acting and declined a number of film roles. She has said that she did so to focus on her marriage. Film observers generally perceived at this time that her career was over.

=== Success with intermittent work (2006–2020) ===
Kunal Kohli's romantic thriller Fanaa (2006) marked Kajol's return to films. She portrayed Zooni Ali Beg, a blind Kashmiri woman who unwittingly falls in love with a terrorist (Aamir Khan). The film was promoted as her comeback, a term she disliked saying that she did not retire but only took a break. Upon release, the film was a financial success, grossing ₹1 billion (US$11 million) against its ₹220 million (US$2.4 million) budget. Both the film and Kajol's performance were received well. Sudhish Kamath of The Hindu wrote Kajol is enough of a reason to watch it, and Deepa Gahlot believed Kajol's conviction in the part made up for the film's flaws. Fanaa fetched Kajol a fourth Filmfare Award and second Zee Cine Award for Best Actress.

Kajol worked intermittently through the rest of the decade. In 2007, she started filming for Rajkumar Santoshi's unreleased mythology film Ramayana, based on the epic of the same name, where she played the goddess Sita. She considered her husband's directorial debut U Me Aur Hum (2008) a special film in her career. In it, she starred as Piya Thapar, a woman suffering from Alzheimer's disease. Although the film underperformed commercially, she received another Filmfare nomination for Best Actress for her performance. The Economic Times' Gaurav Malini noted that Kajol's "simmering pace and ... recurring amnesiac spells, rather than getting repetitive, add compelling credibility to the story".

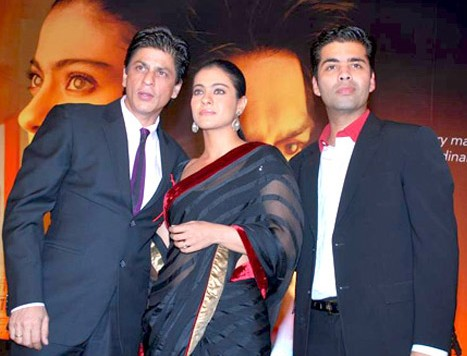
Along with Shah Rukh Khan and Karan Johar promoting My Name Is Khan in 2010. Asked by The Hindu, she described the film as being more intense and different from her earlier projects.

Kajol was next cast opposite Shah Rukh Khan in My Name Is Khan (2010), based on the discrimination faced by American Muslims after the 9/11 terrorist attacks. It was the first Indian film distributed by Fox Star Studios. It opened to mixed-to-positive reviews, and emerged as an international success. My Name Is Khan was screened at the 60th Berlin International Film Festival, the Indian Film Festival of Los Angeles, and the Rome Film Festival. Kajol's portrayal of Mandira, a Hindu single mother who marries a Muslim man with Asperger syndrome was praised by Indian and overseas critics. Rajeev Masand wrote positively of Kajol's sensitive performance, while the Los Angeles Times found her to be appealing in an emotion-based role. For the film, Kajol won a record-tying fifth Best Actress award at Filmfare. Additionally, she was nominated for the Screen Award for Best Actress, the Stardust Award for Best Actress in a Drama and the Zee Cine Award for Best Actor – Female.

In the same year, Kajol was the protagonist in Siddharth Malhotra's We Are Family, an adaptation of the 1998 American drama Stepmom, alongside Kareena Kapoor and Arjun Rampal. Kajol played Maya, a character she identified with for being a "control freak" in chase of perfection, and found it largely different from the one played by Susan Sarandon in the original. Malhotra modelled Maya in part after his grandmother Bina Rai. Mayank Shekhar singled out Kajol's performance as being better than Sarandon's, and Rachel Saltz of The New York Times commented that "her naturalism gives the movie a genuine emotional kick". Kajol's next release that year, Toonpur Ka Super Hero featured her as Priya Kumar, a woman stuck in a cartoon world. Kajol spoke of the challenge and difficulty dubbing for the film. Dubbed the first Hindi live-action animated film, the film polarised critics and failed to attract an audience. Her role was dismissed as not having provided her with scope to perform. She followed it with a second hiatus upon the birth of her son in 2010 although she provided voiceover to the opening credits of the Hindi version of the fantasy film Eega, which released in 2012.

Following a five-year absence, Kajol teamed with Shah Rukh Khan for the seventh time in Rohit Shetty's action romance Dilwale (2015). She portrayed Meera Dev Malik, the daughter of a mafia don who falls for a man from the rival family. Reviewers were varied in their opinions about the film; Mint declared it as the "most tiresome film of the year". Kajol's performance drew positive comments despite a lesser character; in the words of Suhani Singh of India Today, "Kajol is a radiant presence on the screen and delivers what's expected out of her—which is not much." Dilwale emerged as a major commercial success, grossing more than ₹3.8 billion (US$41 million) worldwide, and ranks among of the highest-grossing Bollywood films of all time. Kajol's performance garnered Best Actress nominations at various award ceremonies, including Filmfare.

Later that year, she made her debut as a producer with the Marathi period drama Vitti Dandu, co-produced by Ajay Devgn and Leena Deore, and exploring the relationship between a grandfather and his grandson. The film won the Best Marathi Film trophy at the Screen Awards and was well received by critics. In 2017, Kajol starred opposite Dhanush in Velaiilla Pattadhari 2, a sequel to the 2014 masala film Velaiilla Pattadhari and her second Tamil-language film after Minsara Kanavu. She was cast as Vasundhara Parameshwar, the chairwoman of the construction company Vasundhara Constructions. Kajol was somewhat apprehensive about doing the film but eventually accepted the role due to her faith in Dhanush and director Soundarya Rajinikanth, citing them for giving the bravery she needed to acting in a non-Hindi-language film. Velaiilla Pattadhari 2 opened to a negative critical reception but succeeded financially.

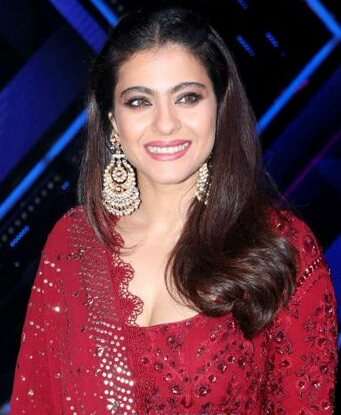
Kajol promoting Tanhaji in 2020

In 2018, Kajol portrayed a helicopter parent with an aspiration to be a singer who enrolls at her son's (Riddhi Sen) college to complete her education in the drama Helicopter Eela, based on Anand Gandhi's Gujarati play Beta, Kaagdo. She was particularly drawn to the role for its colourful personality and her relationship with her son. The feature failed commercially, but the performances were appreciated. The same year she dubbed the character Helen Parr in the animated superhero film Incredibles 2's Hindi version.

By 2020, Kajol said she preferred to consider the importance of character rather than its length. Her first release of the year was the period drama Tanhaji, co-starring Ajay Devgn and Saif Ali Khan. Based on the life of Tanaji Malusare, it went onto become the highest-grossing film of the year, earning ₹3.67 billion (US$39 million). She played Tanhaji's wife Savitribai whom she called a strong character which she found similar to herself. Critics were appreciative of her turn despite her limited screen time. Later in the year, she was seen in her first short film, Devi, a suspense drama about nine women who stay in one room sheltered from the outer world. It was reviewed positively by critics, and Kajol was singled out for leading the diverse ensemble.

=== Streaming projects and further work (2021-present) ===
Kajol's next project was Renuka Shahane's social drama Tribhanga (2021), which marked her first collaboration with Netflix. It revolves around the intergenerational conflict between three women from one family (Kajol, Mithila Palkar and Tanvi Azmi), with Kajol starring as headstrong Odissi dancer. She found resemblance between the relationship of the three leading characters and her own with her mother and daughter. The film and Kajol's performance received positive reviews. Saibal Chatterjee from NDTV praised her for providing the thrilling atmosphere the film needs "to keep trundling along at an even pace"; Stutee Ghosh of The Quint found Azmi and Kajol's strong performances to have "a stunning hold and it's difficult to focus on anyone else when they are in the frame". At the 2nd Filmfare OTT Awards, her performance was nominated in the Best Actress category.

In 2022, Kajol starred in Revathi's Salaam Venky, a drama about euthanasia. The film and her performance were well received, but the film emerged as a box office bomb. The following year, Kajol starred in a segment of the Netflix anthology film Lust Stories 2 and in Disney+ Hotstar's legal drama series, The Trial, an adaptation of the American show The Good Wife. Reviewing the latter, Divya Nair of Rediff.com found her "brilliant" and was appreciative of her chemistry with her co-stars. In Do Patti (2024), Kajol played a Bihari police officer investigating a domestic abuse case involving twin sisters (Kriti Sanon). Kartik Bhardwaj of The New Indian Express dismissed her role and accent.

The following year, Kajol led the mythological horror film Maa (2025), a spinoff to her husband's 2024 film Shaitaan. For her role as a protective mother, she drew upon her own experiences with her children. Critics felt that, despite her best efforts, the film's poor writing had constrained Kajol's performance. It performed moderately at the box office. She next starred opposite Prithviraj Sukumaran in the thriller Sarzameen, for JioHotstar which was panned by critics. Kajol will next lead the action film Maharagni: Queen of Queens.

== Off-screen work ==
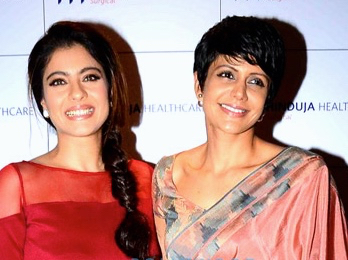
Kajol with Mandira Bedi at the launch of the Women's Wellness event in 2016

In 1998, Kajol participated in concert tour "Awesome Foursome" alongside Shah Rukh Khan, Juhi Chawla, and Akshay Kumar. After travelling across the United Kingdom, Canada and the United States, Kajol refused to participate in any more world tours, unable to handle the stress. In 1999, following the launch of Ajay Devgn's production company, Devgan Films (renamed as Devgn Entertainment and Software Ltd.), Kajol worked towards building a website: "I'm computer savvy. Or at least I know more about computers than those around me. So I should be of some help there."

In 2000, she launched the filmmaking-related online portal Cineexplore for the company, working as the supervisor. Devgn established another company, Ajay Devgn FFilms, in 2009. Kajol clarified she was not involved in its production aspect, but participated in the supervising and overseeing. She featured as a talent judge with husband Ajay Devgn and mother Tanuja in Zee TV's 2008 reality show Rock-N-Roll Family, which she found to be a much tougher experience than that of in films. She was named a part-time member of the public broadcaster Prasar Bharati in 2016. In 2019, she wrote the foreword of a biography on the actress Sridevi, entitled Sridevi: The Eternal Screen Goddess.

Kajol has been actively involved in several philanthropic endeavours related to women and children. She is involved with Shiksha, a non-governmental organisation for children's education, and in 2009 she launched a campaign to support the cause. In 2011, Kajol participated in a fashion show organised by the Cancer Patients Aid Association, to generate funds for the organisation, and as the international goodwill ambassador and patron of The Loomba Trust (a charity organisation devoted to supporting widows and their children around the world, particularly in India). In 2012, Kajol was appointed as the brand ambassador of Pratham, a charity organization for children, and she featured in a short film on education and literacy, with the Hanuman Basti Primary School's students in Mumbai, to support it. Also that year, she made a documentary about protection of the girl child as a part of the Government of Maharashtra's campaign "Save the Girl Child". For her contribution in social service, Kajol was awarded the Karmaveer Puraskar.

== Personal life ==
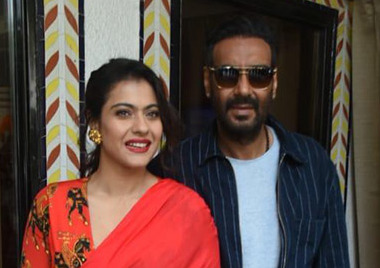
Kajol with her husband Ajay Devgn promoting Tanhaji.

Kajol began dating actor Ajay Devgn in 1994, while filming Gundaraj. Members of the media, however, labelled them as an "unlikely pair" due to their contrasting personalities. Devgn explained their relationship by saying, "We never resorted to the usual 'I love you' routine. A proposal never happened. We grew with each other. Marriage was never discussed, but it was always imminent". The couple married on 24 February 1999 in a traditional Maharashtrian ceremony at Devgn's house. The wedding was subject to wide media scrutiny, as certain members of the media criticised Kajol's decision to settle down at the pinnacle of her career. Kajol, however, maintained that she would not quit films, but would cut down on the amount of work that she did.

Following her marriage, Kajol moved in with Devgn and his parents at the latter's ancestral house in Juhu. Tabloids have often romantically linked Devgn with other Bollywood actresses, and reported an imminent divorce. Dismissing the rumors as gossip, Kajol attested to not paying attention to such talk. Kajol prefers not to talk much about her personal life and dislikes being interviewed, considering it "a waste of time". She gave birth to a daughter, Nysa, on 20 April 2003. Seven years later, on 13 September 2010, she gave birth to a son, Yug. She described motherhood as "fab" and added that her kids brought out "the best in her". Kajol has used Devgan as her surname since 2015. She speaks English, Hindi and Marathi, and can understand Bengali. Her son Yug made his debut with the Hindi dub of Karate Kid: Legends alongside his father Ajay Devgn. In January 2020, Kajol revealed that she suffered two consecutive miscarriages, the first having occurred in 2001, when Kabhi Khushi Kabhi Ghum released.

== Artistry and reception ==
Kajol is acknowledged for her natural acting prowess. The Hindu stated she "does not act out her scenes and deliver her lines; she inhabits her characters." After portraying leading roles in a series of family dramas, Kajol showed her acting versatility with Gupt: The Hidden Truth (1997), for which she was noted as being one of the first actresses of her era to play female anti-hero characters and becoming more popular than the male actors. She was also praised for her lively and spirited nature on-screen. Rajiv Menon credited Kajol as representing the joie de vivre of the 1990s, and Khalid Mohammed described her as "a great packet of talent". According to Open, her spontaneity brought "a unique energy" to her films, and Karan Johar said, "I would call 'action' on a shoot and expect a little atom bomb explosion on set every time Kajol was around because that is who she was. She kept us all on our toes." The scholar Ashish Rajadhyaksha observed that she was the actress "around whom a script can be written and a film made". Film distributor Ramesh Sippy stated that she added prospects to films she starred in.

Unlike most of her contemporaries, Kajol has had a successful career post-marriage and motherhood, for which she was characterised as "the archetypal New Age woman". On breaking the stereotype, she opined: "Perceptions have changed a lot in the last few years. Married actresses don't necessarily have to play character roles in films. Filmmakers are experimenting and this is truly the best time for actresses like us." Following her marriage, journalists speculated it would be the ending point of her career. She continued to work in films but has been more selective, attributing it to the lack of worthy offers and her unwillingness to see herself in "films that are absolutely meaningless".

== In the media ==
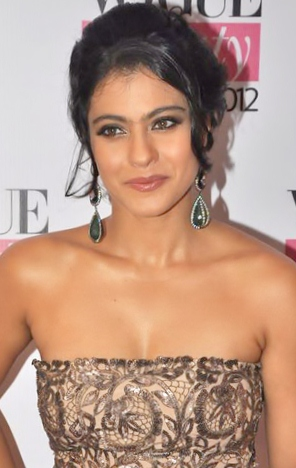
Kajol at the Vogue Beauty Awards in 2012. As one of her most distinctive physical features, Kajol's hazel eyes and unibrow have been identified by the media as her trademark.

Known for her impulsive and stubborn nature, Kajol has been described by commentators to have a striking personality. Sukanya Verma wrote, "Think Kajol, think emotions. Either she is the firebrand or the emotional sensitive type. And sometimes she is pure, wicked fun." While interviewing her for the Hindustan Times in 2008, the journalist Hiren Kotwani took note of her straightforwardness when she was answering the given questions. India Today presumed that her outspoken behaviour have contributed in helping her winning film awards, and further commented, "There is a sparkling spontaneity to Kajol ... Film brats are rapidly tutored on the conventional wisdom of the industry, the line to success that needs to be toed. Maybe Tanuja never taught it, maybe Kajol never listened, for she has abandoned the predictable."

Kajol has been criticised for her lack of interest in maintaining her appearance. Gautam Rajadhyaksha stated she was apathetic of hairstyles and clothes, and would be really happy if she was allowed to wear jeans, a white shirt, and a scarf every day. The journalist Kaveree Bamzai elaborated, "She hardly looks into the mirror, barely even glances at the set monitor, usually the crutch of every insecure actor, puts on make-up only under extreme duress, and ... never watches her old movies." Comparing her to Shabana Azmi and Smita Patil, the producer Mahesh Bhatt observed that Kajol "may not have [their] earthy sensuality but she has that extra sparkle in her eyes and a kind of energy she generates on screen which make her incredible". Filmfare however labelled her an "unconventional beauty", adding that she "set her own rules in the '90s".

Kajol was listed in Box Office India's "Top Actresses" for five consecutive years (1995–1999), topping the list in 1998. In 2001 and 2006, Kajol featured in Rediff.com's annual "Top Bollywood Actresses" listing. Rediff.com also featured her in other lists: "Best Bollywood Actresses Ever", "Best Dressed Woman" and "Top 10 Actresses of 2000–2010". She peaked the fifth position as "the all-time favorite female star" in a 2008 poll conducted by Outlook. In 2012, Kajol was placed at the fourth position by NDTV in the listing of "The Most Popular Actress of All Time", behind Madhuri Dixit, Sridevi and Meena Kumari, and Yahoo! featured her as "one of the ten most iconic beauties of Hindi cinema". Kajol was included on Forbes India's "Celebrity 100", a list based on the income and popularity of India's celebrities, in 2012, 2013 and 2017.

In 2002, Kajol was presented with the Rajiv Gandhi Awards by the Mumbai Pradesh Youth Congress. She was one of the four Bollywood actors, alongside Priyanka Chopra, Hrithik Roshan and Shah Rukh Khan, whose miniature dolls were launched in the United Kingdom, under the name of "Bollywood Legends" in 2006. Kajol and Khan also became the first Indian actors to be invited by NASDAQ to open the NYSE American for promoting their film, My Name Is Khan (2010). In the next year, the Government of India honoured her with the Padma Shri, the fourth highest civilian honour of the country, for her contribution to India's cinema. The Chief Minister of Maharashtra Devendra Fadnavis honoured her with the Swabhimani Mumbaikar Awards. Kajol unveiled her wax statue at Singapore's Madame Tussauds museum in 2018. In 2024, Kajol was placed 36th on IMDb's List of 100 Most Viewed Indian Stars.

== See also ==
- List of Indian film actresses

== Bibliography ==
- Anjaria, Ulka (4 March 2021). Understanding Bollywood: The Grammar of Hindi Cinema. Taylor & Francis. ISBN 978-1-00-034729-6.
- Banaji, S. (2006). Reading 'Bollywood': The Young Audience and Hindi Films. Palgrave Macmillan. ISBN 978-0-230-50120-1.
- Chaudhuri, Shantanu Ray; Nayak, Prashanto Kumar (2005). Icons from Bollywood. Puffin Books. ISBN 978-0-14-333491-0.
- Chaudhuri, Shohini (2005). Contemporary World Cinema: Europe, the Middle East, East Asia And South Asia. Edinburgh University Press. ISBN 978-0-7486-1799-9.
- Cunningham, Stuart; Sinclair, John (2001). Floating Lives: The Media and Asian Diasporas. Rowman & Littlefield. ISBN 978-0-7425-1136-1.
- Dawar, Ramesh (2006). Bollywood Yesterday-Today-Tomorrow. Star Publications. ISBN 978-1-905863-01-3.
- Dwyer, Rachel (2000). All You Want is Money, All You Need is Love: Sexuality and Romance in Modern India. Cassell. ISBN 978-0-304-70321-0.
- Edwards, Elizabeth; Bhaumik, Kaushik (15 December 2008). Visual Sense: A Cultural Reader. Berg Publishers. ISBN 978-1-84520-740-3.
- Haiderali, Karim (1 June 2003). The Media of Diaspora. Psychology Press. ISBN 978-0-415-27930-7.
- Ganti, Tejaswini (16 February 2012). Producing Bollywood: Inside the Contemporary Hindi Film Industry. Duke University Press. ISBN 978-0-8223-5213-6.
- Hogan, Patrick Colm (3 June 2009). Understanding Indian Movies: Culture, Cognition, and Cinematic Imagination. University of Texas Press. ISBN 978-0-292-77955-6.
- Viswamohan, Aysha Iqbal; Tom, Liza (3 January 2020). Viswamohan, Aysha Iqbal; Wilkinson, Clare M. (eds.). Stardom in Contemporary Hindi Cinema: Celebrity and Fame in Globalized Times. Springer Nature. pp. 15–30. ISBN 978-981-15-0191-3.
- Iyengar, Niranjan (2012). Patel, Bhaichand (ed.). Bollywood's Top 20 Superstars of Indian Cinema. Penguin Books. ISBN 978-0-670-08572-9.
- Liz, Gogerly (2010). Adams, Julia (ed.). 21st Century Lives: Bollywood Stars. Sydney Australia: Wayland. ISBN 978-0-7502-6206-4.
- McNally, Karen (16 December 2010). Billy Wilder, Movie-Maker: Critical Essays on the Films. McFarland. ISBN 978-0-7864-4211-9.
- Pomerance, Murray (18 January 2005). Where the Boys Are: Cinemas of Masculinity and Youth. Wayne State University Press. ISBN 978-0-8143-3666-3.
- Vasudevan, Ravi (2000). Making Meaning in Indian Cinema. Oxford University Press. ISBN 978-0-19-564545-3.
