= Gautam Rajadhyaksha =

Photographer

- Born: 16 September 1950; Bombay, Bombay State, India
- Died: 13 September 2011 (aged 60); Mumbai, Maharashtra, India
- Education: St. Xavier's College, Mumbai
- Occupations: Fashion photographer, Teacher, Writer
- Years active: 1974–2011
- Employer: Lintas India Ltd (now Lowe Lintas)
- Known for: Celebrity portraiture, Fashion photography
- Notable work: Faces (1997)
- Relatives: Shobhaa De (cousin)

Gautam Rajadhyaksha (16 September 1950 – 13 September 2011) was one of India's leading fashion photographers, and was based in Mumbai, India. He was one of India's best known celebrity portraitists, having photographed almost all the icons of the Indian film industry.

== Personal life and education ==
Born in Mumbai, Rajadhyaksha was educated at St. Xavier's High School, Fort, and obtained his degree in chemistry at St. Xavier's College, Mumbai, where he later also taught for two years. He is a cousin of noted novelist Shobha De.

== Career ==
Having completed a diploma in advertising and public relations, Rajadhyaksha joined the photo services department of the advertising agency Lintas India Ltd (now Lowe Lintas), in 1974. He eventually became the head of his department. During his 15-year stint, he participated in the creation of milestone ad campaigns while pursuing his childhood passion for photography.

His first encounter with fashion photography happened 1980, when he happen to shoot pictures of actress Shabana Azmi (a college mate), Tina Munim and Jackie Shroff, and his passion for portraiture photography was lit, eventually he left his advertising job in 1987, and took up commercial photography full-time, and soon started doing product campaigns, media assignments and fashion portfolios.

While he was still working for the Lintas, as a copywriter, Shobha De his cousin invited him to write for her magazine, 'Celebrity', soon after started shooting photographs for his articles, this got him attention and soon acclaim as a glamour photographer, and before long he started working for other magazines as well, including The Illustrated Weekly of India, and film magazines like Stardust, Cineblitz and Filmfare.

Apart from doing occasional television talk shows, he edited Marathi entertainment fortnightly, 'Chanderi' and composed a popular column, Manas Chitra, in a leading Marathi news daily.

His 1997 released coffee table book, titled Faces, contained profiles of 45 film personalities beginning with Durga Khote, one of India's first ladies of the Indian screen and ending with Aishwarya Rai, the former Miss World and today Bollywood's leading actress. In 1992, he wrote his first screenplay, for the film, 'Bekhudi', which launched actress Kajol's career and his second, 'Anjaam' presented, Madhuri Dixit with a challenging role. In 2000, he held his first ever photo-exhibition in Pune which showcased, twenty years of his photography work. Exhibitions of Rajadhyaksha's work have been held in Pune, Goa and Kolhapur with all attracting large crowds. Further exhibitions of his work in San Francisco, London, Birmingham and Dubai, have all been well attended as well.

He used to idolise the work of Jitendra Arya and was also influenced by his works published in Filmfare, The Illustrated Weekly of India and The Times of India.

== Death ==
Rajadhyaksha died on 13 September 2011, in the morning, three days before his 61st birthday, from a heart attack.

== Filmography ==
=== Movie stills ===
- Henna (1991);
- Hum Aapke Hain Koun...! (1994);
- Dil To Pagal Hai (1997);
- Ishq (1997);
- Pyaar To Hona Hi Tha (1998);
- Kuch Kuch Hota Hai (1998);
- Hum Saath Saath Hain (1999);
- Hu Tu Tu (1999);
- Kabhi Khushi Kabhie Gham (2001).

=== Screenwriter ===
- Bekhudi (1992);
- Anjaam (1994) (story);
- Sakhi (2007) (story and screenplay).
