= Pyar Pyar =

Pyar Pyar प्यार प्यार
- Directed by: Sunil R. Prasad
- Starring: Sujoy Mukherjee; Paresh Rawal; Viju Khote; Sulochana Latkar
- Music by: Nadeem–Shravan
- Release date: 1993

Pyar Pyar is a 1993 Bollywood film starring Sujoy Mukherjee. The film also stars Rajeshwari Sachdev and Faraz Khan in supporting roles.

== Plot ==
Widowed Rajkumar Chauhan is an honest and diligent Income Tax Officer, who does his job without being intimidated or accepting bribes. The role is played by Paresh Rawal.

== Cast ==
- Sujoy Mukherjee as Vicky Chauhan
- Kiran Kumar as Rajkumar Chauhan
- Paresh Rawal as Dhansukhbhai Dharamshi
- Rajeshwari Sachdev as Dolly Dharamshi
- Beena as Dhansukhbhai's sister
- Viju Khote as College Professor
- Sulochana Latkar as Rajkumar's mother
- Subbiraj as Mr. Agarwal
- Mushtaq Khan as R.S. Gaitonde
- Arif Khan as Sandy
- Shiva as Monty
- Yunus Parvez as Chief Minister
- Guddi Maruti as Dolly's friend

== Soundtrack ==
The music of the film was composed Nadeem-Shravan and the lyrics were penned by Sameer, Hasrat Jaipuri and Anwar Saagar.

1. "Dagi Dum Dum" - Sadhana Sargam, Nitin Mukesh
2. "Ek Tere Hi Chehre Pe Pyar Aaya" - Kumar Sanu, Anuradha Paudwal
3. "Elaan Yeh Karte Hein" - Anuradha Paudwal, Mohammed Aziz
4. "Kahan Ja Rahe Ho Savere Savere" - Suresh Wadkar
5. "Operator Operator" - Vinod Rathod, Sapna Mukherjee
6. "Paas Hi Mera Ghar Hai" - Kumar Sanu, Anuradha Paudwal
