= Baali Umar Ko Salaam =

- Directed by: Vasant Patel
- Starring: Kamal Sadanah; Tisca Chopra
- Cinematography: R. Raghunatha Reddy
- Music by: Bappi Lahiri
- Release date: 18 February 1994
- Country: India
- Language: Hindi

Baali Umar Ko Salaam is a 1994 Hindi film starring Kamal Sadanah, and Tisca Chopra. The music was composed by Bappi Lahiri.

== Plot ==
Rahul, the only son of Seth Banwarilal, does not think twice before spending money, and is also very arrogant and shrude. Seth Banwarilal is always tensed about Rahul and decides to get him married in order to get him on the right track. Rahul, not wanting to marry, runs away from his house along with Peter, to Chamba. Here, he comes in contact with Nikky, who is the daughter of the industrialist Mr. Jalan. After many conflicts, fights and misunderstandings, the two fall in love. Rahul wants to marry Nikky, but, Banwarilal does not want Rahul to marry a girl of his choice. On the other hand, Jalan also disapproves of Rahul. Will the two be able to marry each other and live the life of their dreams? Will Banwarilal and Jalan accept the couple?

== Cast ==
- Kamal Sadanah as Rahul
- Tisca Chopra as Nikki
- Saeed Jaffrey as Jalan
- Anupam Kher as Banwarilal
- Beena Banerjee as Mrs. Banwarilal
- Ali Asgar as Peter

== Music ==
The songs were written by Nawab Arzoo.

1. "Baali Umar Ko Salaam " - Alka Yagnik
2. "Baali Umar Ko Salaam" - Kumar Sanu
3. "Darte Darte Tum Kaho Kuch Darte Darte Hum Kahe" - Asha Bhosle, Kumar Sanu
4. "Chupke Teri Aankhon Mein Saari Duniya Se" - Asha Bhosle, Udit Narayan
5. "Ding Dong Ding Dong" - Kumar Sanu, Alka Yagnik
6. "Aankhon Se Aankhen" - Kumar Sanu, Rajshree Biswas
7. "O Gulbadan" - Mohammed Aziz
