= Arif Khan (former actor) =

Indian actor

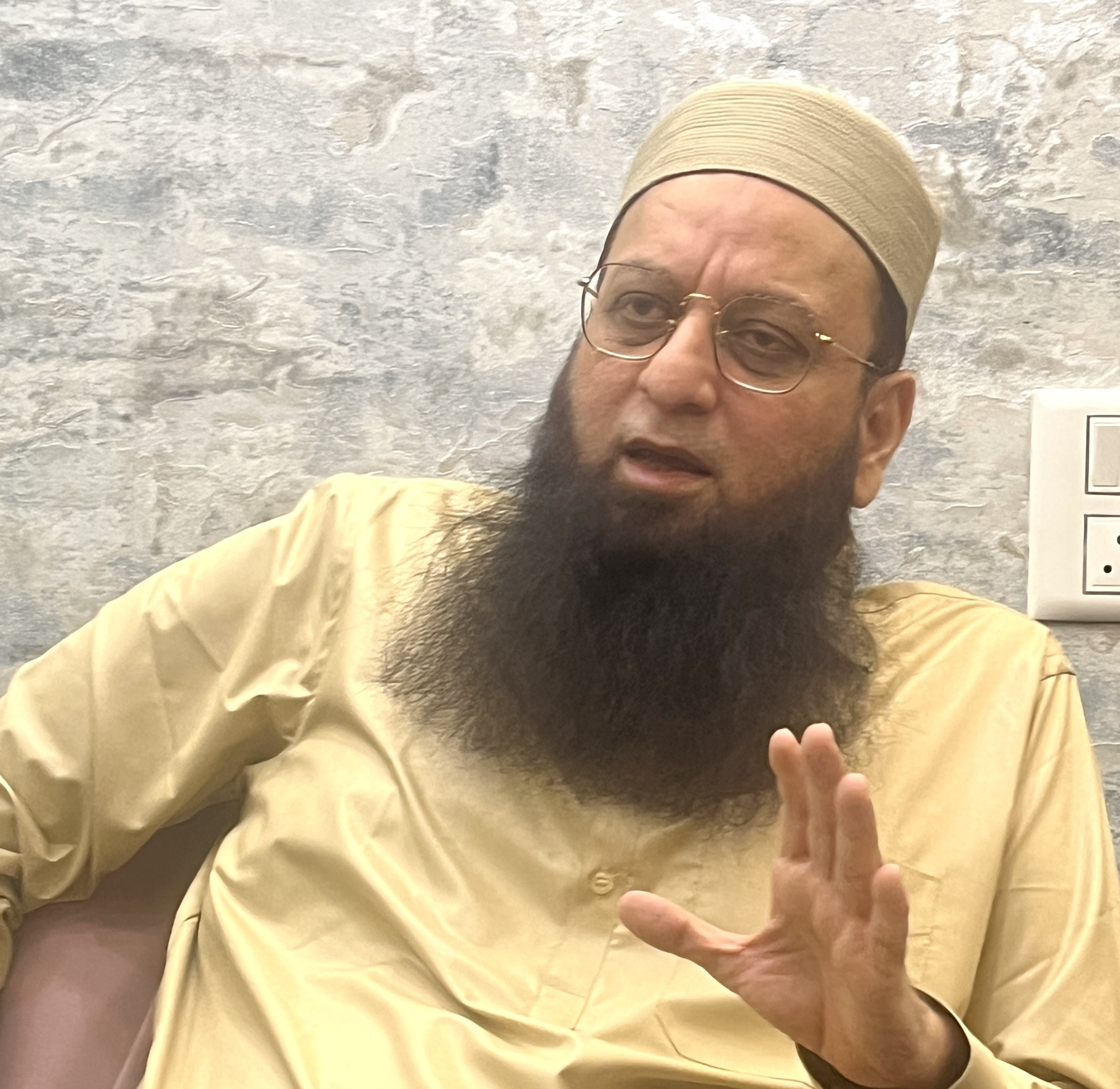
- Born: 1 May 1968 (age 58); Mumbai, Maharashtra, India
- Occupations: Former actor, preacher
- Years active: 1991–2007
- Notable work: Phool Aur Kaante, Tejasvini, Hulchul, Veergati

Arif Khan is a former Bollywood actor known for his roles in several films during the 1990s, including Phool Aur Kaante (1991), Tejasvini (1994), and Hulchul (1995). He often portrayed negative or rival characters. After his appearance in the 2007 Hollywood film A Mighty Heart, Khan decided to leave the film industry to focus on religious and personal growth. He had been associated with the Tablighi Jamaat since 1997 and chose to fully dedicate his time to its religious activities and preaching.

== Early life and background ==
Arif Khan was born on 1 May 1968 in Mumbai, Maharashtra, India. He grew up in a family where his father worked as a tailor, and Khan initially learned tailoring and design from him. His interest in modeling led him to the entertainment industry, where he was offered a role in Phool Aur Kaante by film producer Dinesh Patel.

== Acting career ==
Khan's acting debut in Phool Aur Kaante (1991) was commercially successful, and he gained recognition for his performance. He subsequently appeared in several films in the 1990s, often portraying negative characters or rivals to the protagonists. His notable films include Mohra (1994), Veergati (1995), and Diljale (1996). In 2007, Khan played a taxi driver in the Hollywood film A Mighty Heart, alongside Angelina Jolie.

== Transition to Religious life ==
Khan left the film industry after a decade and chose a life focused on spiritual growth. During the 1997 Mumbai International Tablighi Ijtema (gathering), he became associated with the Tablighi Jamaat, an Islamic missionary movement. He has since dedicated himself to religious activities and personal growth. Khan actively participates in preaching and has distanced himself from the entertainment industry.

Khan's decision to leave Bollywood was influenced by his family, particularly his mother and wife, who supported a life aligned with Islamic values. His brother, Yousuf Khan, also guided him toward this path.

== Filmography ==
Here are some notable films featuring Khan:

Filmography
Year	Film	Role	IMDb Rating
1991	Phool Aur Kaante	Rocky	6.0
1992	Muskurahat	Verma's Son	7.3
1993	Baaghi Sultana	-	4.4
1993	Pyar Pyar	Sandy	
1993	Boy Friend	Kumar	4.5
1994	Mohra	-	7.0
1994	Tejasvini	Vicky Khurana	6.1
1995	Ahankaar	-	6.2
1995	Hulchul	Niranjan Shobraj (uncredited)	4.5
1995	Veergati	College Troublemaker	5.8
1996	Diljale	-	5.8
1996	Hasina Aur Nagina	Vikram	3.9
1997	Zameer: The Awakening of a Soul	Vikram (Gajraj's Brother)	4.1
1998	Mohabbat Aur Jung	Shakti	4.3
2000	Ek Hi Manzil	-	N/A
2007	A Mighty Heart	Mariane's Taxi Driver	6.6
