= Mohabbat Aur Jung =

- Directed by: Hameed Alam
- Starring: Mohnish Bahl; Rakesh Bedi; Dinesh Hingoo; Bharat Kapoor; Kamal Sadanah; Deepak Tijori
- Music by: Dilip Sen-Sameer Sen
- Production company: Sri Ram Films
- Release date: 27 February 1998
- Running time: 126 min
- Country: India
- Language: Hindi
- Budget: ₹1.5 crore (US$160,000)

Mohabbat Aur Jung (transl. Love and War) was a 1998 Hindi action drama film directed by Hameed Alam. The film was made on a budget of ₹1.5 crore (US$160,000) and turned out to be a flop.

== Plot ==
The central character is a boy who fights against the local gangsters selling drugs in his college. One day the principal is killed and the blame goes on him. The police inspector turns out to be the principal's son who has vowed to avenge the life of his mother.

== Cast ==
- Deepak Tijori as Police Inspector Karan
- Kamal Sadanah as Vicky
- Mohnish Bahl as Bobby
- Bharat Kapoor as Dhanraj
- Rakesh Bedi as Saajan
- Kanchan as Bijli
- Neelam Kothari as Priya
- Mohan Joshi as Chotulal
- Tiku Talsania as Havaldar Vithoba
- Dinesh Hingoo as Havaldar Khandwa
- Mushtaq Khan as Bheema
- Rohini Hattangadi as Pratima
- Aparajita as Principal Rajani
- Raju Shrestha as Raju
- Arif Khan as Shakti

== Soundtrack ==
1. "Dekho Dekho Kauva Chala Hai Hans Ki Chal" - Bali Brahmbhatt, Sudesh Bhosle
2. "Dil Leke Haathon Me" - Kumar Sanu, Alka Yagnik
3. "Pyaar Hi Pyaar Hai" - Udit Narayan, Kavita Krishnamurthy
4. "Tukai Tukai (Tune Ye Kya Jaadu Kiya)" - Abhijeet, Poornima
