= Kamal Sadanah =

Indian actor, producer and director (born 1970)

- Born: 21 October 1970 (age 55); Mumbai, Maharashtra, India
- Years active: 1990–2007, 2014-2023
- Spouse: Lisa John
- Children: Angath Sadanah
- Parent(s): Brij Sadanah (father); Sayeeda Khan (mother)
- Relatives: Sadanah family

Kamal Sadanah (born 21 October 1970) is an Indian actor, producer and director. He is the son of producer and director Brij Sadanah and actress Sayeeda Khan.

== Career ==
Kamal made his acting debut alongside Kajol in the 1992 film Bekhudi which did not perform well at the box office. In 1993, he achieved greater success in Rang in which he acted along with the late Divya Bharti. He subsequently acted in a string of films throughout the 1990s but failed to achieve the same level of success as Rang and, at the end of the decade, took a hiatus from acting for several years.

In 2005, he returned to acting and made his directorial debut with the low-budget film titled Karkash starring himself, Anup Soni and Suchitra Pillai.

In 2007, he joined the television industry with a role in the Zee TV television serial Kasamh Se. That same year, he acted in and produced Victoria No. 203 which is a remake of his father's 1972 hit film of the same title.

In 2014, he wrote and directed Roar: Tigers of the Sundarbans.

In 2022, he returned to acting after 15 years in Salaam Venky, directed by Revathy and reuniting him with his first co-star Kajol. The film released on December 9 2022.

== Personal life ==
Kamal Sadanah is the son of producer and director Brij Sadanah and actress Sayeeda Khan. While his father was a Hindu, his mother was a Muslim. Kamal had a sister named Namrata. Jyothika is Kamal's cousin sister as Kamal's father Brij and Jyothika's father Chander Sadanah were brothers. Jyothika is married to renowned actor and producer Suriya. They have a son and a daughter.

On 21 October 1990, Kamal was making arrangements for his 20th birthday party when a quarrel broke out between his parents, in the lower floor of the house, followed by gunshots. Kamal rushed at the scene to find both his mother and sister shot and unconscious. Kamal said that his father, who was inebriated, aimed a shot at him but missed upon which Kamal lost consciousness. After waking in a hospital, he was informed that after shooting the two women Brij Sadanah had turned the pistol upon himself and committed suicide.

Two years later, Kamal made his acting debut in Bekhudi released in July 1992. His next film, Rang, was successful and he followed this success with ten additional starring roles throughout the 1990s. Most of these films other films met with tepid responses from the audience, and Kamal subsequently left the film industry until 2005.

During this hiatus Kamal married make-up artist Lisa John. They have two children together, a son Angath and a daughter Namrata, named after Kamal's late sister. Kamal’s production company 'Angath Arts Private Limited' is named after his son.

In 2005, Kamal appeared as a hero for the last time in the film Karkash opposite Suchitra Pillai. The two actors co-produced the film, which was directed by Kamal. This was an effort by both actors to revitalize their careers, along with their finances. However, the film received a limited release and did not do well. In 2007, Kamal produced the film Victoria No. 203, which was directed by Anant Mahadevan. The resulting film was an almost frame-by-frame remake of his father's film Victoria No. 203 which had been a superhit in 1972. The remake performed poorly at the box office.

== Filmography ==
- All films are in Hindi, unless otherwise noted.

=== As actor ===
Year	Film	Role	Notes
1992	Bekhudi	Rohit	
1993	Rang	Yogi Joshi	
1994	Fauj	Jatashankar	
1994	Baali Umar Ko Salaam	Rahul	
1995	Jai Maa Vaishnav Devi		
1995	Hum Sab Chor Hain	Kamal D. Verma	
1995	Rock Dancer	Rocky	
1996	Hum Hain Premi		
1996	Angaara	Vishal	
1997	Nirnayak		
1998	Mohabbat Aur Jung	Vicky	
1999	Jaalsaaz		
2000	Kaali Topi Laal Rumaal		
2005	Karkash		
2006	Kasamh Se	Mohan Khandelwal	Television Serial
2007	Victoria No. 203	Ranjeet	
2022	Salaam Venky	Karunesh Prasad	
2023	Pippa	Sam Manekshaw	

=== As director ===
Year	Film	Notes
2005	Karkash	
2014	Roar: Tigers of the Sundarbans	

=== As producer ===
Year	Film
1990	C.I.D.
2007	Victoria No. 203
