= Veergati =

- USB cover
- Directed by: K.K. Singh
- Written by: K.K. Singh
- Produced by: K.K. Singh; Babu Latiwala
- Starring: Salman Khan; Divya Dutta; Atul Agnihotri; Akhilendra Mishra
- Cinematography: Sanjay Malvankar
- Edited by: Kuku - Cuckoo
- Music by: Aadesh Shrivastava
- Production company: BK Combines
- Distributed by: Bombino Video
- Release date: 29 September 1995
- Running time: 166 minutes
- Country: India
- Language: Hindi
- Budget: ₹3.75 crore
- Box office: ₹8.60 crore

Veergati (Martyrdom) is a 1995 Indian Hindi-language action film written, produced and directed by K.K Singh, starring Salman Khan, Atul Agnihotri, Divya Dutta and Akhilendra Mishra. This film is only film of Pooja Dadwal. Upon release the film received negative reviews mostly for its action, and underperformed at box office, but had a successful DVD release.

== Plot ==
Hawaldar finds an abandoned newborn baby boy in the gutter of Kamathipura, a red light area of Mumbai. A prostitute, meanwhile gave birth to another baby boy. She decides to educate him and requests Hawaldar to give him a father's name. Hawaldar's wife does not accept the child and leaves for her parents home. Hawaldar adopts the child and names him Ajay while the prostitute's son is named Shlok. Both are admitted to School and become friends. Shlok does well in studies whereas Ajay takes up gambling. Shlok falls in love with Pooja, daughter of J.K - a millionaire. Ajay does not believe in love and is a cynic. Havaldar tries his best to get Ajay a job, but Ajay finds it difficult to work in a corrupt society. Ekka Seth is a terror in the prostitutes' basti, he exploits the innocent girls and forces them into prostitution. Shlok graduates and completes his M.B.A. Ajay wins a crore rupees in gambling and encourages Shlok to pursue his project. Ekka and his men abduct and kill Hawaldar's daughter, Sandhya. Ajay decides to avenge this and proceeds to kill Ekka's men and frees the sex workers from his clutches. He then takes on Ekka and manages to kill him, but is grievously injured in the fight. The final scene shows Ajay dying in front of Shlok after burning Ekka alive and attaining martyrdom.

== Cast ==
- Salman Khan as Ajay
- Atul Agnihotri as Shlok
- Sudesh Berry as Police Inspector Neelkanth Singh
- Divya Dutta as Sandhya
- Pooja Dadwal as Pooja
- Akhilendra Mishra as Ikka Seth
- Himani Shivpuri as Razia, Shlok's mom and Ajay's adopted mom
- Farida Jalal as Parvati
- Rohini Hattangadi as Shanta
- Saeed Jaffrey as JK, Pooja's dad
- Kulbhushan Kharbanda as Havaldar Godbole
- Sudhir Pandey as Police Commissioner Shankar Singh
- Pramod Moutho as Minister Brahmachari
- Amrit Pal as Abu
- Jack Gaud as Jack Gulati
- Avtar Gill as Sarju
- Tinnu Anand as Purshottham, Ikka's man
- Arif Khan as College Punk

== Soundtrack ==
The music was composed by Aadesh Shrivastava. All lyrics were written by Indeevar, Dev Kohli, Shyam Raj and Madan Pal.

Veergati

Soundtrack album by Aadesh Shrivastava
- Released: 1995
- Recorded: 1995
- Genre: Soundtrack
- Length: 35:13
- Label: Trimurti Sound
- Producer: Aadesh Shrivastava

Aadesh Shrivastava chronology
Sauda (1995)	Veergati (1995)	Ram Shastra (1995)

Track list
No.	Title	Singer(s)	Length
1.	"Mausam Ne Badal Se"	Kumar Sanu, Bela Sulakhe	4:36
2.	"Meri Nigah Main"	Kumar Sanu, Sadhana Sargam	7:18
3.	"Tum Dil Main Bas Gaye Ho"	Mangal Singh, Sadhana Sargam	5:27
4.	"Tu Meethi Hai Tu Namkeen Hai"	Aadesh Shrivastava, Vijeta Pandit	6:02
5.	"Khud Se Har Koi Rootha Hai""	Kumar Sanu, Poornima	5:55
6.	"Jahan Kabhi Dil Ne Khai Thokar"	Suresh Wadkar, chorus	5:55
Total length:			35:13
