= Stardust Award for Best Actress in a Drama =

Film award in India

The Stardust Award for Best Actress in a Drama is an annual award chosen by the readers of Stardust magazine. The award honours a star that has made an impact with their acting in a film.

== List of winners ==
- 2011 Aishwarya Rai Bachchan for Guzaarish
  - Bipasha Basu for Lamhaa
  - Kajol for My Name Is Khan & We Are Family
  - Kareena Kapoor for We Are Family
  - Katrina Kaif for Raajneeti
- 2012 Vidya Balan for The Dirty Picture
  - Deepika Padukone for Aarakshan
  - Katrina Kaif for Zindagi Na Milegi Dobara
  - Kareena Kapoor for Bodyguard
  - Priyanka Chopra for 7 Khoon Maaf
  - Rani Mukerji for No One Killed Jessica
  - Vidya Balan for No One Killed Jessica
- 2013 Priyanka Chopra for Barfi! & Sridevi for English Vinglish
  - Deepika Padukone for Cocktail
  - Kareena Kapoor for Heroine
- 2015 Priyanka Chopra for Mary Kom
  - Alia Bhatt for Highway
  - Madhuri Dixit for Dedh Ishqiya
  - Shraddha Kapoor for Haider

== See also ==
- Stardust Awards
- Bollywood
- Cinema of India
