= Maharagni: Queen of Queens =

Indian film by Charan Tej Uppalapati

- First look poster
- Directed by: Charan Tej Uppalapati
- Written by: Charan Tej Uppalapati
- Screenplay by: Niranjan Iyengar; Jessica Khurana
- Produced by: Venkata Anish Dorigillu
- Starring: Kajol; Prabhu Deva; Naseeruddin Shah; Samyuktha
- Cinematography: G. K. Vishnu
- Edited by: Navin Nooli
- Music by: Harshavardhan Rameshwar
- Production companies: Baweja Studios; E7 Entertainments
- Country: India
- Language: Hindi

Maharagni: Queen of Queens is an upcoming Indian Hindi-language action thriller film directed by Charan Tej Uppalapati in his directorial debut. It stars Kajol in the title role, alongside Prabhu Deva, Naseeruddin Shah, Samyuktha (in her Hindi debut), Jisshu Sengupta, Aditya Seal, Pramod Pathak, and Chhaya Kadam.

== Plot ==
The film is a revenge drama centered on Maya, a woman on a mission for vengeance. It is the story of a mother and a daughter.

== Cast ==
- Kajol as Maya
- Prabhu Deva as Arjun
- Naseeruddin Shah as Krishna
- Jisshu Sengupta as Karan
- Samyuktha as Mohini, Maya's daughter
- Aditya Seal as Akash, Mohini's love-interest
- Chhaya Kadam as Neeta
- Pramod Pathak as Ajay

== Production ==
The film marks the reunion of Kajol and Prabhu Deva after nearly three decades, having last appeared together in Minsara Kanavu (1997). It also marks Prabhu Deva's return to acting after focusing on directorial ventures. The film's first schedule has been completed, and the official teaser was released on 28 May 2024. By October 2024, production was reported to be nearing completion, with the shoot expected to conclude that month. Originally made in Hindi, the film will also be released in Telugu, Tamil, Kannada, and Malayalam.
