= Victoria No. 203 (2007 film) =

- Poster for Victoria No. 203
- Directed by: Anant Mahadevan
- Written by: Manoj Tyagi (adaptation); Sanjeev Puri (dialogue)
- Produced by: Kamal Sadanah
- Starring: Om Puri; Anupam Kher; Jimmy Sheirgill; Johnny Lever; Preeti Jhangiani; Javed Jaffrey; Soniya Mehra
- Cinematography: Thomas A. Xavier; Pushan Kripalani
- Edited by: Sanjib Datta
- Music by: Viju Shah
- Production company: Angath Arts
- Release date: 31 August 2007
- Country: India
- Language: Hindi

Victoria No. 203: Diamonds Are Forever is a 2007 Indian Hindi-language heist comedy thriller film directed by Anant Mahadevan and produced by Kamal Sadanah, the son of Brij Sadanah who produced and directed the original film. It is a remake of the 1972 film, Victoria No.203. The film stars Om Puri, Anupam Kher, Jimmy Shergill, Preeti Jhangiani, Javed Jaffrey, Johnny Lever and debutant Soniya Mehra, the daughter of late actor Vinod Mehra. The film was released on 31 August 2007.

== Plot ==
Bobby Bombata (Javed Jaffrey), a huge industrialist, and his girlfriend Devyani (Preeti Jhangiani) plan the theft of these diamonds along with Ranjit (Kamal Sadanah), a cold-blooded assassin. They hire Tora (Tora Khasgir), an expert dacoit, to carry out the action. Tora double-crosses Bobby with the help of her brother Karan (Rajesh Khera), but in the process gets killed. But she hides the diamond in a carriage, Victoria No.203. Raman, the driver of the carriage Victoria No. 203, is unaware of this and offers to help her, but the police level charges of murder and put him behind bars. A diamond expert Jimmy (Jimmy Sheirgill) and two small-time-but-quite-old crooks, Raja (Anupam Kher) and Rana (Om Puri), are also behind the diamonds. Raman's daughter Sara (Sonia Vinod Mehra) takes up the responsibility of freeing her father. Who gets possession of the diamond forms the rest of the story.

== Cast ==
- Anupam Kher as Raja
- Om Puri as Rana
- Jimmy Sheirgill as Jimmy Joseph
- Preeti Jhangiani as Devyani / Mona
- Kamal Sadanah as Ranjeet
- Javed Jaffrey as Bobby 'BB' Bombatta
- Johnny Lever as Ghanshyam Dhanwani
- Aditi Govitrikar as Babyji

== Music ==
The film's music was composed by Viju Shah with lyrics written by Verma Malik, Indeevar, Asif Ali Beg and Chandrashekhar Rajit.

Victoria No. 203: Diamonds Are Forever

Film score by Viju Shah
- Released: 2007
- Label: Saregama

Track listing
No.	Title	Singer(s)	Length
1.	"Victoria 203"	Dominique Cerejo	5:12
2.	"Zindagi Aa Gayi"	Zubeen Garg	5:21
3.	"Deedani"	Shaan	4:51
4.	"Do Bechare"	Amit Kumar	5:43
5.	"Thoda Sa Thero"	Shreya Ghoshal	5:57

== Reception ==
Taran Adarsh of Bollywood Hungama gave the film 1.5 out of 5 stars.
