= Kuch Khatti Kuch Meethi =

2001 film by Rahul Rawail

- Poster
- Directed by: Rahul Rawail
- Written by: Bholu Khan; Aman Jeffery (dialogues)
- Screenplay by: Raju Saigal
- Story by: Sudhir Mishra
- Based on: The Parent Trap by David Swift
- Produced by: Rita Rawail; B.L. Saboo; Pritish Nandy; Rangita Pritish Nandy
- Starring: Kajol; Sunil Shetty; Rishi Kapoor; Rati Agnihotri
- Cinematography: Nirmal Jani
- Edited by: Rahul Rawail
- Music by: Anu Malik
- Production companies: Bharat Film Works; Saboo Films
- Distributed by: Pritish Nandy Communications
- Release date: 19 January 2001
- Running time: 139 minutes
- Country: India
- Language: Hindi
- Budget: ₹6 crore
- Box office: ₹10.55 crore

Kuch Khatti Kuch Meethi (transl. A Little Sour, A Little Sweet) is a 2001 Indian Hindi-language comedy film directed by Rahul Rawail and starring Kajol in dual roles of estranged identical twins. The film also stars Sunil Shetty, Rishi Kapoor, Rati Agnihotri, and Pooja Batra.

== Plot ==
Raj Khanna is a wealthy businessman married to Archana. Seeking Raj’s wealth, his evil stepsister, Devyani, falsely tells him that Archana is having an affair with another man. Believing her, Raj and Archana decide to separate. Shortly before their separation, Archana gives birth to twin girls. One is taken from her and given to Raj, while the other remains with Archana. Sweety grows up with her father, while Archana moves to London with Tina.

Sweety later refuses to marry the man chosen by Raj and runs away to London. Through a series of coincidences, she meets Tina, and the twins discover each other. They decide to switch places and work together to reunite their parents.

When Tina meets Raj, she discovers that he is having an affair with Savitri. Meanwhile, Tina’s boyfriend, Samir, helps the twins in their efforts to bring Raj and Archana back together. Raj and Archana eventually meet again and consider resuming their life together.

== Cast ==
- Rishi Kapoor as Raj Khanna, Archana's husband.
- Suniel Shetty as Sameer
- Kajol as Tina / Sweety Khanna, Raj and Archana's twin daughters. (dual role)
- Rati Agnihotri as Archana Khanna, Raj's wife.
- Parmeet Sethi as Ranjeet Ahuja
- Mita Vasisht as Devyani
- Razzak Khan as Balu
- Pooja Batra as Savitri
- Pramod Moutho as Doctor
- Dinesh Hingoo as Sweety's prospective father-in-law

== Soundtrack ==
The film's soundtrack contains 8 songs composed by Anu Malik and lyrics penned by Sameer.

1. "Tumko Sirf Tumko": Alka Yagnik & Kumar Sanu
2. "Neend Udh Rahi Hai": Alka Yagnik & Kumar Sanu
3. "Saamne Baith Kar": Alka Yagnik & Kumar Sanu
4. "Ab Nahi To Kabh": Sunidhi Chauhan & Anu Malik
5. "Tumko Sirf Tumko": Kumar Sanu
6. "Khud Bhi Nachungi": Alka Yagnik
7. "Bandh Kamare Mein": Anuradha Sriram
8. "Kuch Kuch Khatti, Kuch Kuch Meethi": Alka Yagnik

== Reception ==
Suman Tarafdar of Filmfare rated the film two stars and gave a critical review of both the film and Kajol's performance. According to critic Arati Koppar, writing for the same publication, the film's ending was borrowed from "some low-budget" Telugu-language films. Savera R Someshwar of Rediff.com stated ″Most films have their moments. This one, sadly, doesn't. Everything is forced. There is not one moment in the film that I could call funny, or touching. Or anything. The twins meeting each other for the first time—thanda [cold]. The parent-child reunion scenes—thanda.

Taran Adarsh of IndiaFM rated the film 2/5, writing "On the whole, KUCH KHATTI KUCH MEETHI is a welcome change from the usual bang, bang, shoot'em up flicks produced in the recent times. The film has its share of flaws, but the fact cannot be ruled out that it is a feel-good film. The film has a genuine buoyancy that leaves a viewer happy."
