= Bekhudi =

1992 Indian film by Rahul Rawail

- Theatrical release poster
- Directed by: Rahul Rawail
- Screenplay by: Indira; Gautam Rajadhyaksha
- Story by: Indira; Gautam Rajadhyaksha
- Produced by: Maharukh Jokhi; Rita Rawail
- Starring: Kamal Sadanah; Kajol
- Cinematography: Kamlakar Rao
- Edited by: Suresh Chaturvedi
- Music by: Songs: Nadeem–Shravan; Background Score: Vanraj Bhatia
- Production company: Dream Merchants
- Release date: 31 July 1992
- Running time: 154 minutes
- Country: India
- Language: Hindi
- Box office: ₹7.5 million

Bekhudi is a 1992 Indian Hindi-language action drama film directed by Rahul Rawail, starring Kamal Sadanah and Kajol (in their acting debut). Its story revolves on Rohit and Radhika, who's against her parents' disapproval of their relationship.

== Plot ==
Rohit is a law student and the son of Judge Gupta. Rohit beats up Rocky in a flying device competition. Radhika is Rocky's sister, who attends the same college as Rohit and her brother. In college, Rohit meets Radhika and they eventually fall in love. When Rocky is caught cheating on an exam, he threatens the invigilator and slaps the principal. A case is filed against Rocky and he is sentenced by Gupta to seven days in jail and is expelled from college. His mother and father hide Rocky's prison sentence from Radhika. Radhika's aunty Shobha arrives from Canada and tells Radhika's parents about her wish to marry Radhika to Vicky in the United States. Radhika tells her aunt that she is too young to marry Vicky. Eventually, Rohit's father and Radhika's father Mahendranath learn their children are in love and agree to discuss marriage. Before the meeting, Rohit had been unaware of the situation.

Gupta returns without meeting with Mahendranath as he has been attacked by Rocky, who doesn't want her sister married to Rohit. Incensed, Rohit rushes to the hotel and fights with Rocky, who falls from the hotel's rooftop and dies. Radhika's parents blame Rohit for the death of their son and decide to marry Radhika to Vicky. Because Rohit continues trying to meet Radhika, her parents send Radhika to Canada to stay with Shobha. Gupta asks his son to go to Canada in search of Radhika. Rohit's luggage is stolen by the local hoodlum Rambhau "Rambo", when he arrives in Canada. Rohit and Radhika find each other in Canada and Radhika runs with Rohit. Since there are ten days before Radhika turns 18 and becomes a consenting adult, Rohit and Radhika search for a home.

When caught by Rohit, Rambo takes them to a house he claims to be his. The next morning, Rohit and Radhika discover Rambo has vanished and they have accidentally been staying in Vicky's house. Vicky tells Rohit and Radhika they can stay in the house and that he will help them get married on Radhika's 18th birthday. Shobha also arrives at Vicky's house in search of Radhika. Shobha sees Rohit, who quickly goes outside. Vicky tells Shobha that to find Radhika, she should return to Edmonton where she has filed a missing person complaint. Vicky watches Radhika coming out of the bathroom; Radhika and Rohit were having a good time and Vicky takes photographs of them.

With only one day left before Radhika's birthday, Vicky asks Rohit to go out for an errand. Radhika feels uneasy and asks Rohit not to leave her. Rohit says she should not doubt Vicky and that he will return within two hours. Radhika discovers that Vicky has torn up all photographs to remove Rohit with only Radhika left in the photos. She runs downstairs but finds both of her parents there, along with Vicky and learns all three are planning to force Radhika to marry Vicky. Vicky tells Rohit he is going to marry Radhika and beats him up until Rohit is unconscious. Rohit regains consciousness and Rambo helps Rohit to reach the wedding venue.

Rohit and Vicky fight with each other. Vicky beats up Rohit again and asks Radhika to marry him. Seeing Rohit's life in danger, Radhika agrees to marry Vicky and gets ready. When Rohit congratulates her for getting married, she asks him to stay and watch the wedding she does not want. Radhika's parents and Shobha realize their mistake. Vicky becomes enraged and says if Radhika will not marry him, nobody else can. He then shoots a gun. Rohit and Radhika run away and Vicky chases them with a helicopter. Radhika is shot in her shoulder. Rohit takes a jet ski and causes Vicky's helicopter to crash. Rohit returns to Radhika, who regains consciousness. The two meet & all return to India, seeing Gupta welcomes them with Band-Party, indicating their marriage.

== Cast ==
The cast as follows

- Kamal Sadanah as Rohit Gupta
- Kajol as Radhika
- Tanuja as Nalini
- Farida Jalal as Shobha
- Kulbhushan Kharbanda as Judge Gupta
- Vijayendra Ghatge as Mahendranath
- Razak Khan as Vicky
- Rami Reddy as Rocky
- Rajendranath as Rambhau "Rambo"

== Production ==
Saif Ali Khan was originally set to make his debut in Bekhudi with the role of Rohit but after completing the first shooting schedule of the film, Khan was deemed unprofessional by director Rahul Rawail and was replaced by another debutant, Kamal Sadanah; while filming Bekhudi, Khan met actress Amrita Singh and married her in October 1991. Saif Ali Khan later revealed that the producer, Rita Rawail, used to ask him for kisses in order to be paid. It also marked Kajol's debut at the age of eighteen. In an interview with Mayank Shekhar of Mid-Day, she stated that she got the offer while she visited photographer Gautam Rajadhyaksha's studio; it was described by her as "a big dose of luck".

== Soundtrack ==
The soundtrack of the movie was composed by the music duo Nadeem–Shravan. The lyrics were written by Anwar Sagar, Sikandar Bharati, Saima Nadeem and Surendra Saathi.

| Song | Singer |
|---|---|
| "Aa Khel Khelen Hum" | Asha Bhosle, Kumar Sanu |
| "Khat Maine Tere" | Asha Bhosle, Kumar Sanu |
| "Mummy Daddy Meri" | Asha Bhosle, Kumar Sanu |
| "Mujhe Kya Pata" | Asha Bhosle, Kumar Sanu |
| "Mujhe Yaad Karna" | Asha Bhosle, Kumar Sanu |
| "Mujhe Yaad Karna" | Asha Bhosle |
| "Main Pyar Karnewala" | Vinod Rathod |
| "Tu Kahan Yeh Bata" | Vinod Rathod |

== Release and reception ==
Bekhudi premiered at the Metro Cinema on 31 July 1992. Lalita Dileep from The Indian Express wrote in her review that Sadanah is endearing in his role, but it was Kajol who "steals the show", observing of her: "This gambolling beauty makes a lasting impact on the screen. She is bound to go places. Though she has been portrayed in skimpy costumes, she still exudes an innocent charm."
