= Rock-N-Roll Family =

- The "Rock-N-Roll Family" logo.
- Directed by: Satish Dutt
- Presented by: Sharad Kelkar; Mauli Dave
- Judges: Ajay Devgan; Kajol; Tanuja
- Opening theme: "Rock-N-Roll Family" by Sonu Nigam
- Country of origin: India
- No. of episodes: 27

Production
- Running time: 90 Minutes

Original release
- Network: Zee TV
- Release: 15 March – 14 June 2008

Rock-N-Roll Family is a dance competition and singing competition show which first broadcast on Zee TV, the date it first broadcast on is 15 March 2008 'til 14 June 2008. The 'Grand-Finale' of the show was held in Indore, Madhya Pradesh on 14 June 2008. It is first of its kind show that will target audience of all age groups and all segments of Indian society. Like from most of the other reality shows, Rock-N-Roll Family will be different because it will create a platform where 3 generation of family members will be able to participate. It will broadcast every Saturday and Sunday. The judges of the shows were the Bollywood actors Ajay Devgn, Kajol and Tanuja, all of whom are related to each other.

Besides that the families will have to perform different acts based on popular music on various themes. Judgment will be on the basis of scores by an esteemed panel of judges from entertainment industry and through audience votes.

== Judges ==
- Kajol
- Ajay Devgn
- Tanuja

== Hosts ==
- Sharad Kelkar
- Mauli Dave

== Winner ==
- Roy Family from Kolkata won with 5,37,110 votes.

== Grand-Finale Voting/Final Decision ==
- North Zone Results
  ♥ No.1: Saxena Family
  ♥ No.2: Bhalke Family
  ♥ No.3: Roy Family
- Central Zone Results
  ♥ No.1: Bhalke Family
  ♥ No.2: Roy Family
  ♥ No.3: Saxena Family
- East & South Zone Results
  ♥ No.1: Roy Family
  ♥ No.2: Saxena Family
  ♥ No.3: Bhalke Family

Total Votes

- Roy Family --- 5,37,109
- Bhalke Family --- 5,26,304
- Saxena Family --- 4,97,214

== Rock-N-Roll Family Awards ==
- Best Dada: Mr. Bhalakrishan Bhalke
- Best Dadi: Mrs. Shanti Saxena
- Best Papa: Mr. Jackie Roy
- Best Mommy: Mrs. Puja Kohli
- Best Child: Shivantika Saxena

== Contestants ==
Originals

Name	City/State	Status	Status Date	Elimination Episode Number
Roy Family	Kolkata, West Bengal	Winner	14 June	Episode 27
Bhalke Family	Indore, Madhya Pradesh	1st Runner-up	14 June	Episode 27
Saxena Family	Jaipur, Rajasthan	2nd Runner-up	14 June	Episode 27
Patel Family	Ahmedabad, Gujarat	Voted out	23 May	Episode 22
Neema Family	Indore, Madhya Pradesh	Voted out	9 May	Episode 18
Gupta Family	Delhi	Voted out	2 May	Episode 16
Oza Family	Bhavnagar, Gujarat	Voted out	25 April	Episode 14
Rathod Family	Indore, Madhya Pradesh	Voted out	18 April	Episode 12
Jain Family	Ghaziabad, Uttar Pradesh	Voted out	11 April	Episode 10
Kapoor Family	Jaipur, Rajasthan	Disqualified	4 April	Episode 8
Ubale Family	Pune, Maharashtra	Disqualified	4 April	Episode 8
Joshi Family	Lucknow, Uttar Pradesh	Voted out	28 March	Episode 5

Wildcard entrants

Name	City/State	Status	Status Date	Elimination Episode Number
Ubale Family	Pune, Maharashtra	Voted out	30 May	Episode 24
Kohli Family	Agra, Uttar Pradesh	Voted out	6 June	Episode 26

== Celebrity Guests ==
- Week 2:21 March 2008 --- Sunil Shetty, Tusshar Kapoor, & Sameera Reddy
- Week 3:29 March 2008 --- Tanisha Mukherjee
- Week 4:4 April 2008 --- Ajay Devgan's family
- Week 6:18 April 2008 --- Jeetendra & Esha Deol
- Week 11:24 May 2008 --- Karan Johar
- Week 12:30 May 2008 --- Harbhajan Singh
- Week 13:7 June 2008 --- Ayesha Takia & also Sanobar Kabir, Kashmera Shah & Sambhavna Singh
- Week 14:13 June 2008 --- Tanisha Mukherjee
- Grand-Finale:14 June 2008 --- Amita Pathak, Nikul Mehta & Adhyayan Suman star cast from movie Haale Dil; also presented the Rock-N-Roll Family awards.
