= We Are Family (2010 film) =

2010 Indian film by Siddharth P. Malhotra

- Theatrical release poster
- Directed by: Siddharth P. Malhotra
- Screenplay by: Venita Coelho
- Based on: Stepmom by: Gigi Levangie; Jessie Nelson; Steven Rogers; Karen Leigh Hopkins; Ron Bass
- Produced by: Hiroo Yash Johar; Karan Johar
- Starring: Kajol; Kareena Kapoor; Arjun Rampal
- Cinematography: K. U. Mohanan
- Edited by: Deepa Bhatia
- Music by: Original Soundtrack: Shankar–Ehsaan–Loy; Title Theme: Salim-Sulaiman; Background Score: Raju Singh
- Production companies: SPE Films India Private Limited; Dharma Productions Private Limited; UTV Motion Pictures
- Distributed by: SPE Films India Private Limited
- Release date: 3 September 2010
- Running time: 115 minutes
- Country: India
- Language: Hindi

We Are Family is a 2010 Indian Hindi-language family drama film directed by Siddharth P. Malhotra and produced by Hiroo Yash Johar and Karan Johar under Dharma Productions. It was co-produced and distributed by SPE Films India and UTV Motion Pictures. An official Indian adaptation of the 1998 American film Stepmom, the film stars Kajol, Kareena Kapoor, and Arjun Rampal in lead roles.

Initially scheduled for release on 10 September 2010, the film was advanced to 3 September to avoid clashing with Dabangg (2010). Upon release, We Are Family received generally positive reviews from critics, with particular acclaim for the performances of Kajol and Kapoor. However, it underperformed commercially, grossing around ₹42 crore worldwide against a budget of ₹28 crore.

At the 56th Filmfare Awards, Kapoor won the Best Supporting Actress award for her role. A promotional mobile video game based on the film was developed and released by Indiagames, a subsidiary of UTV Software Communications.

== Plot ==
Maya is a devoted single mother who shares custody of her three children—Aaliya, Ankush, and Anjali—with her ex-husband, Aman. The family dynamic is disrupted when Aman introduces his girlfriend, Shreya, a career-focused fashion designer. Initially unable to connect with the children, Shreya is viewed with suspicion, mainly by Aaliya, especially after a misunderstanding during Anjali's birthday party and a subsequent incident where Anjali briefly goes missing under her care.

Maya later discovers that she has terminal cervical cancer. Concerned for her children's future, she asks Shreya to take over maternal responsibilities after her death. Though hesitant at first, Shreya eventually agrees and begins to bond with the children. Tensions ease as Shreya adapts to her role, and Maya entrusts her with guardianship. Maya spends her final days with the family and passes away following a Diwali celebration. The film concludes with a flash-forward to Aaliya's wedding, where Shreya, now married to Aman, reflects on Maya's legacy and her role as the children's stepmother.

== Cast ==
- Kajol as Maya: Aman's ex-wife, Aaliya, Ankush and Anjali's mother (Few lines as Mona Ghosh Shetty)
- Kareena Kapoor as Shreya Arora: Aman's girlfriend turned wife, Aaliya, Ankush and Anjali's step-mother
- Arjun Rampal as Aman: Shreya's husband, Maya's ex-husband, Aaliya, Ankush and Anjali's father
- Aanchal Munjal as Aaliya: Aman and Maya's elder daughter, Shreya's step-daughter
  - Amrita Prakash as Adult Aaliya (cameo appearance)
- Nominath Ginsberg as Ankush: Aman and Maya's only son, Shreya's step-son
  - Ankit Malik as Adult Ankush (cameo appearance)
- Diya Sonecha as Anjali: Aman and Maya's younger daughter, Shreya's step-daughter
  - Dincy Vira as Adult Anjali (cameo appearance)
- Iravati Harshe as Dr. Rati Malhotra, Maya's doctor

== Production ==
Karan Johar acquired the official rights to adapt the American film Stepmom (1998) for Indian audiences, initially working under the title Love You Maa. Rather than purchasing the rights outright, Johar opted to co-produce the film with Sony Pictures, marking one of the first collaborations between a major Hollywood studio and an Indian production house.

Principal photography took place between November 2009 and April 2010 in Sydney, Australia, and Mumbai. Director Siddharth P. Malhotra later revealed that several scenes addressing racial discrimination in Australia were removed during editing to avoid appearing exploitative amid real-life incidents of violence against Indian students in the country.

== Soundtrack ==
We Are Family

Soundtrack album by Shankar–Ehsaan–Loy
- Released: 2 August 2010
- Genre: Film soundtrack
- Length: 26:22
- Label: Sony Music India
- Producer: Karan Johar

Shankar–Ehsaan–Loy chronology
Housefull (2010)	We Are Family (2010)	Patiala House (2010)

The soundtrack features six original songs composed by Shankar–Ehsaan–Loy, with lyrics by Irshad Kamil and Anvita Dutt Guptan. One of the tracks, "Jailhouse Rock," serves as a tribute to the Elvis Presley classic of the same name.

=== Track list ===
No.	Title	Singer(s)	Length
1.	"Ankhon Mein Neendein"	Rahat Fateh Ali Khan and Shreya Ghoshal	5:02
2.	"Dil Khol Ke Let's Rock"	Anushka Manchanda, Akriti Kakkar and Suraj Jagan	3:57
3.	"Reham O Karam"	Vishal Dadlani and Shankar Mahadevan	5:47
4.	"Hamesha & Forever"	Sonu Nigam and Shreya Ghoshal	4:51
5.	"Sun Le Dua Yeh Aasmaan" (Theme Slow Version)	Bela Shende	3:53
6.	"We Are Family" (Theme)	Salim-Sulaiman	2:48
7.	"Noor E Khuda"	Adnan Sami, Shankar Mahadevan and Shreya Ghoshal	6:39
8.	"Aaj Kal Zindagi"	Shankar Mahadevan	4:14
9.	"Kabhi Alvida Naa Kehna"	Sonu Nigam and Alka Yagnik	8:04
10.	"Kal Ho Naa Ho"	Sonu Nigam	4:54

Notes

- Tracks 7 to 10 are listed as bonus tracks on the audio CD release and are reused songs from previous Dharma Productions films.

== Release ==
The teaser trailer for We Are Family premiered with I Hate Luv Storys, which was released on 2 July 2010. The film was initially slated for release on 10 September 2010, but the date was advanced to 3 September to avoid a box office clash with Dabangg.

== Reception ==
=== Box office ===
The film opened with ₹27 million on its first day and collected ₹205 million by the end of its second week. Its total domestic gross reached approximately ₹220 million.[4] Though declared "average" in India, the film performed relatively well overseas, particularly in the United Kingdom, and was classified as a "semi-hit" by Box Office India.

=== Critical response ===
We Are Family received mixed-to-positive reviews from critics, with widespread praise for the performances of Kajol and Kareena Kapoor. Indo-Asian News Service rated the film 4 out of 5, calling it "equally appealing from the outside and at the heart." Hindustan Times gave it 2 out of 5 stars, while India Today noted, "Kajol cries, Kareena cries, the kids cry, and even Arjun Rampal sheds an artful tear. We weep for the loss of two hours."

== Accolades ==
Award	Date of the ceremony	Category	Recipients	Result	Ref.
Zee Cine Awards	14 January 2011	Best Actor in a Supporting Role – Female	Kareena Kapoor	Nominated	
Filmfare Awards	29 January 2011	Best Supporting Actress	Kareena Kapoor	Won	
Stardust Awards	6 February 2011	Best Actress in a Drama	Kajol	Nominated	
Stardust Awards	6 February 2011	Best Actress in a Drama	Kareena Kapoor	Nominated	
