= Hulchul (1995 film) =

1995 Indian film by Anees Bazmee

- Promotional Poster
- Directed by: Anees Bazmee
- Written by: Anees Bazmee
- Produced by: Lalit Kapoor; Shabnam Kapoor
- Starring: Ajay Devgn; Kajol; Vinod Khanna; Amrish Puri; Ronit Roy; Kader Khan
- Cinematography: S. Pappu
- Edited by: Dilip Kotalgi; Zafar Sultan
- Music by: Anu Malik
- Production company: Amit Arts
- Distributed by: Goldmines Telefilms
- Release date: 4 August 1995
- Running time: 160 minutes
- Country: India
- Language: Hindi
- Budget: ₹ 45 million
- Box office: ₹ 98.1 million

Hulchul (English: Chaos) is a 1995 Indian Hindi-language action thriller film directed and written by Anees Bazmee. It stars Vinod Khanna, Ajay Devgn, Kajol, Ronit Roy, Amrish Puri and Kader Khan in the lead roles. It was the first of many collaborations between future husband and wife Devgn and Kajol.

Hulchul was released worldwide on 4 August 1995.

== Plot ==
Deva (Ajay Devgn) has been raised by ACP Siddhant (Vinod Khanna) and his wife Pushpa (Navni Parihar). Karan (Ronit Roy) is their biological son who often feels jealous of his mother's attention to Deva. Deva is a loving and responsible son while Karan is a constant source of stress for his parents due to his reckless lifestyle. Shobraj (Amrish Puri) is a rich and powerful businessman whose son is arrested by ACP Siddhant on charges of rape and murder. Shobraj tries to bribe Siddhant into releasing his son but fails.

In the meantime, Karan is arrested on charges of murdering his girlfriend. Pushpa is heart broken at the thought of losing her son. Deva vows to prove Karan's innocence for the sake of his foster mother. Shobraj approaches Siddhant again and promises to save Karan if Siddhant rescinds his testimony against his son. Siddhant refuses his offer and Shobraj's son is sentenced to death. Deva, with the help of his girlfriend Sharmili (Kajol), discovers that Karan's girlfriend was actually murdered by Rocky. It is revealed that Shobraj had paid Rocky to frame Karan for the murder. Deva catches Rocky and takes him to the police station. However, Shobraj has Rocky murdered before the latter can make his statement in front of a judge. In the meantime, a higher court rejects the appeal of Shobraj's son and the latter is executed. Shobraj vows to kill Siddhant's entire family to avenge the death of his son. He kidnaps Karan and Pushpa and tells Siddhant to come and meet him. Deva goes to rescue Puspha while Siddhant goes to meet Shobraj. A fight ensues in which Shobraj and his men are killed and Karan, Puspha, Deva, and Siddhant are reunited.

== Cast ==
- Vinod Khanna as Assistant Commissioner Siddhant Rajvanshi
- Ajay Devgn as Deva Choudhary
- Amrish Puri as Shobhraj Chand Singh
- Kajol as Sharmili Sinha
- Sujata Mehta as Lekha Choudhary
- Ronit Roy as Vardhaan "Karan" Rajvanshi
- Navni Parihar as Pushpa Rajvanshi
- Kader Khan as Yogendra Rajvanshi
- Alok Nath as Om Gautam, Chief Minister Uncredited
- Imtiaz Khan as Police Commissioner Shivyendu Malik
- Arif Khan as Niranjan Shobhraj
- Ranjeet as Shobhraj's Friend
- Mohan Joshi as Shobhraj's Friend
- Babloo Mukherjee as Bablu, Karan's Friend
- Rajesh Behl as Public Prosecutor
- Narendra Gupta as Bhandari, Shobhraj's Secretary
- Sanjeev Dhabholkar aka Sanjeeva as Michael, Shobhraj's henchmen
- Deven Verma as Vinod Bhai
- Suresh Chatwal as Suryakant Choudhary
- Dinesh Hingoo as Hotel Owner, Fan of Madhuri Dixit (Guest Role)

== Production ==
Kajol met Ajay Devgn on the sets of this film. the role of Sharmili was originally offered to Divya Bharti but after her sudden death in 1993, she was replaced by Kajol.

== Soundtrack ==
#	Title	Singer(s)	Lyricist(s)
1	"Tu Mere Man Ki"	Alka Yagnik, Vinod Rathod	Kulwant Jani
2	"Pehli Dafaa Is Dil Mein"	Kumar Sanu, Alka Yagnik	Faaiz Anwar
3	"Main Laila Ki"	Vinod Rathod, Sadhana Sargam	Indeevar
4	"I Am Sixteen"	Vinod Rathod, Alisha Chinai	Zafar Gorakhpuri
5	"Bando Pe Apne Ae Daata"	Sonu Nigam, Sadhana Sargam	Abhilash
6	"Saawan Ka Mahina"	Vinod Rathod, Alisha Chinai	M. G. Hashmat
