= Gundaraj =

1995 Indian film by Guddu Dhanoa

- Release poster
- Hindi: गुण्डाराज
- Directed by: Guddu Dhanoa
- Written by: Anees Bazmee (dialogue); Robin Henry (screenplay)
- Produced by: Lalit Kapoor; Raju Narula
- Starring: Ajay Devgn; Kajol; Amrish Puri; Asrani
- Cinematography: Sripad Natu
- Edited by: V.N. Mayekar
- Music by: Songs: Anu Malik; Background Score: Surinder Sodhi
- Production company: Tridev Arts
- Distributed by: Shemaroo Entertainment
- Release date: 7 September 1995
- Country: India
- Language: Hindi

Gundaraj (Rule of goons) is a 1995 Indian Hindi-language action crime film directed by Guddu Dhanoa. It stars Ajay Devgn, Kajol and Amrish Puri. The film premiered on 7 September 1995 in Mumbai. The film became a commercial failure at the box office.

== Plot ==
Ajay Chauhan lives with his parents and younger sister. He is in love with Pooja, and hopes to marry her someday. His father wants him to get a job and settle down, and then get married. However, Ajay applies for a job in Bombay, and soon receives a letter asking him to appear for an interview. He attends the interview, and is hired. Delighted to see all his dreams coming true, he goes to offer his thanks to God, and it is there a woman named Pratika Jetley sees him and notifies the police that he is indeed the one who had brutally raped three young women in a college campus. An enraged Ajay vehemently denies this, but is personally identified and criminally held responsible, convicted and sentenced to prison. Several years later, he is released from prison, and finds out that his father and Pooja had committed suicide, his sister had become mentally ill while his mother was untraceable. He sets out to put his life together and meets with a ruthless police inspector, whose daughter was one of the rape victims. It is then Ajay finds out about the conspiracy behind this plot to frame him. A news reporter Ritu (Kajol) helps him track down the real culprits and bring them to justice. Meanwhile, Ajay and Ritu start getting attracted to each other and they fall in love. It is revealed that the real culprits are Deka, Manya and Raj Bahadur (Baba).

== Cast ==
- Ajay Devgan as Ajay Chauhan
- Kajol as Ritu
- Anjali Jathar as Pooja
- Amrish Puri as Police Inspector Jaiwashnath
- G. Asrani as Gopal
- Mohan Joshi as Raj Bahadur a.k.a. Baba
- Mohnish Bahl as Manya
- Sharat Saxena as Deka
- Usha Nadkarni as Parvati Chauhan
- Achyut Potdar as Amit Chauhan
- Ahmed Khan (actor) as College Correspondent Jaitley
- Sulabha Arya as Principal Pratika Jaitley
- Madan Jain as Police Inspector Vijay Sharma
- Kalpana Iyer as Public Prosecutor
- Deven Verma as Ritu Boss Senior Journalist
- Janardhan Parab as Police Constable
- Suresh Chatwal as Interviewer
- Beena Banerjee as Judge wife
- Shashi Sharma as young lady who is saved from being raped

== Soundtrack ==
- Lyrics: Rahat Indori, Zameer Kazmi, Zafar Gorakhpuri & Shyam Anuragi
- Singers: Kumar Sanu, Alka Yagnik, Alisha Chinai, Sadhana Sargam & Bali Brahmabhatt
- Music : Anu Malik

#	Title	Singer(s)	Lyricist
1	"Ek Nigah Mein"	Kumar Sanu, Alisha Chinai	Zafar Gorakhpuri
2	"I Love You"	Kumar Sanu, Alisha Chinai	Zafar Gorakhpuri
3	"Mujhe Tum Se"	Kumar Sanu, Sadhana Sargam	Zameer Kazmi
4	"Cham Ke Dhup"	Kumar Sanu, Alka Yagnik	Rahat Indori
5	"Dhadke Dhadke Mera"	Kumar Sanu, Sadhana Sargam	Zameer Kazmi
6	"Bad Boys"	Bali Brahmabhatt, Alisha Chinai	Shyam Anuragi
