= Pyaar To Hona Hi Tha =

1998 Indian film by Anees Bazmee

- Theatrical release poster
- Directed by: Anees Bazmee
- Written by: Anees Bazmee
- Based on: French Kiss by Lawrence Kasdan
- Produced by: Gordhan Tanwani
- Starring: Ajay Devgn; Kajol; Om Puri
- Cinematography: Nirmal Jani
- Edited by: Suresh Chaturvedi
- Music by: Songs: Jatin–Lalit; Background score: Surinder Sodhi
- Production company: Baba Films
- Distributed by: Videosound
- Release date: 24 July 1998 (India)
- Running time: 156 minutes
- Country: India
- Language: Hindi
- Budget: ₹7.50 crore
- Box office: ₹38.27 crore

Pyaar To Hona Hi Tha (transl. Love Was Bound to Happen) is a 1998 Indian Hindi-language romantic comedy film directed by Anees Bazmee, starring Ajay Devgn and Kajol. The film is an unofficial remake of the 1995 film French Kiss, starring Meg Ryan and Kevin Kline. At the 44th Filmfare Awards, Pyaar To Hona Hi Tha received 5 nominations, including Best Film and Best Supporting Actor (Puri), and won Best Female Playback Singer (Jaspinder Narula for "Pyaar To Hona Hi Tha").

Moreover, Kajol also received a Best Actress nomination at the ceremony for her performance in the film, but instead won the award for her performance in Kuch Kuch Hota Hai. The film was remade in Kannada as Preetisle Beku (2003).

== Plot ==
Sanjana, an exceptionally clumsy woman, lives in Paris. She works for Harish Patel. She is about to marry her love, Rahul. Rahul is about to go to India on a business trip and Sanjana insists on going with him, even though she has an intense fear of flying. When the plane is ready to take off, Sanjana's fear gets the best of her and she creates havoc on the plane, managing to get herself off the aircraft safely. A few days later, during a phone call to Sanjana, a tipsy Rahul blurts out that he has fallen in love with a woman named Nisha Jaitley and is breaking up with Sanjana.

Sanjana decides to fly to India and get Rahul back, whatever the cost. As the plane to India is about to take off, a passenger named Shekhar Suryavanshi sits next to her. He realizes that Sanjana is scared of flying, so he diverts her attention by provoking her. During the flight, Sanjana accidentally spills a drink on Shekhar and realizes that he is hiding something. Shekhar goes to the toilet, and while inside he pulls a plant wrapped in cloth out of his pocket. He unwraps the cloth covering the plant, revealing a diamond necklace that he had stolen from Paris. After returning to his seat, he puts the necklace in one of Sanjana's bags in order to sneak it through customs. After a chaotic flight, the plane lands in India.

Sanjana's bags are stolen at the hotel reception, and Shekhar decides to stay with her as a way of staying close to the necklace. Meanwhile, Police Inspector Khan is after Shekhar for stealing the necklace. After recovering the bags, Shekhar and Sanjana end up in Shekhar's native village, where they participate in the festivities surrounding the engagement of Shekhar's younger sister, Chutki. Shekhar, meanwhile, is falling in love with Sanjana but does not tell her. During a conversation with Shekhar's family, Sanjana finds out that Shekhar wanted to earn money for the surgery of his nephew, who needs a heart transplant. She tells him that she has had the diamond necklace all along, while Shekhar promises to help Sanjana get Rahul back.

Rahul has gone to Palam Beach with Nisha, and Sanjana, still in love with Rahul, is determined to get Rahul back. Sanjana and Shekhar go to Palam Beach and find Rahul and Nisha, and Shekhar pretends to be Sanjana's boyfriend to make Rahul jealous, all the while being careful not to reveal his true feelings to her. Sanjana, unfortunately, opts for another plot – acting as a rich heiress – and makes Rahul rethink his relationship with her. Shekhar and Sanjana are invited to Nisha's birthday party, where she announces that she and Rahul are engaged. Sanjana is shocked, and in a moment realizes that she has fallen for the brooding, intense Shekhar. However, she does not tell him, not knowing that he loves her as well.

One day, Inspector Khan finds Sanjana and tells her that Shekhar has stolen the necklace and that if he gets the necklace back, he will not arrest Shekhar. Sanjana, knowing how important the necklace is for Shekhar, gives it back to Inspector Khan and tells her boss in Paris to send all her savings in Indian rupees. She gives that money to Shekhar but tells him that she sold the necklace and that she has decided to return to France. After Sanjana leaves, Inspector Khan tells Shekhar what Sanjana did for him, and he rushes off to the airport to tell Sanjana he loves her. He creates a ruckus and manages to stop her flight from taking off. Shekhar tells Sanjana he loves her, and she tearfully confesses that she loves him too. The two embrace on the plane in front of the cheering passengers.

== Cast ==
- Ajay Devgn as Shekhar Suryavanshi
- Kajol as Sanjana
- Om Puri as Inspector Iftikhar Khan
- Sunil Grover as Barber Gulshan Sharma
- Bijay Anand as Rahul Bajaj, Sanjana's fiancé.
- Kashmera Shah as Nisha Jaitley, Rahul's lover.
- Harish Patel as Amrish Patel, Sanjana's boss.
- Reema Lagoo as Rukmini Suryavanshi, Vardaan's wife and Shekhar's sister-in-law.
- Aanjjan Srivastav as Anupam Suryavanshi, Shekhar's father.
- Tiku Talsania as Kumar Mangat / Sher Singh
- Adi Irani as Hotel Receptionist
- Brahmachari as Station Master
- Satish Kaul as Pankaj Jaitley, Nisha's father.
- Mushtaq Khan as John, a thief
- Ghanshyam Rohera as Ram Singh, Inspector Khan's assistant
- Purnima Talwalkar as Suhana Suryavanshi, Shekhar's sister
- Mohsin Memon as Vijay Suryavanshi, Shekhar's nephew.
- Asha Sharma as Somiksha Suryavanshi, Shekhar's mother.
- Ashish Nagpal as Vardaan Suryavanshi, Shekhar's elder brother.
- Shama Deshpande as Anita Jaitley, Nisha's mother.
- Anupam Shyam as Robber

== Music ==
Pyaar To Hona Hi Tha

Soundtrack album by Jatin–Lalit
- Released: 12 April 1998
- Genre: Feature film soundtrack
- Length: 35:08
- Label: Sony Music India

The soundtrack was released by Baba Music and with around 3.2 million units sold, it was the fourth highest-selling album of 1998 after Kuch Kuch Hota Hai (also by Jatin–Lalit), Dil Se.. and Soldier. It received nominations at the Filmfare, Star Screen and Zee Cine Awards for Best Music Direction by Jatin–Lalit. "Jab Kisiki Taraf Dil" became the most popular and iconic song from the album.

A guitar riff from Bryan Adams' "Have You Ever Really Loved A Woman?" was sampled in the title track.

All music is composed by Jatin–Lalit.

No.	Title	Lyrics	Singer(s)	Length
1.	"Jab Kisiki Taraf Dil"	Vinod Mahendra	Kumar Sanu	6:55
2.	"Ajnabi Mujhko Itna Bata"	Sameer	Asha Bhosle, Udit Narayan	6:14
3.	"Aashiq Hoon Main"	Sameer	Asha Bhosle, Udit Narayan	5:21
4.	"Aaj Hai Sagaai"	Sameer	Abhijeet, Alka Yagnik	7:11
5.	"Jo Hona Hai"	Sameer	Asha Bhosle, Vinod Rathod, Mohammad Aziz, Sudesh Bhosle, Bali Brahmabhatt, Arun Bakshi	8:12
6.	"Pyar To Hona Hi Tha"	Sameer	Remo Fernandes, Jaspinder Narula	3:08

== Reception ==
=== Critical response ===
Anupama Chopra of India Today criticised the script, writing, "Bazmee, who has written some of David Dhawan's most successful films, including Aankhen, creates some effective comedy and a credible tension between the lovers but he tries to cover too many bases."

=== Box office ===
The film was the third highest grosser of 1998.

=== Accolades ===
Year	Award	Category	Nominee(s)	Result
1999	44th Filmfare Awards	Best Film	Gordhan Tanwani	Nominated
1999	44th Filmfare Awards	Best Actress	Kajol	Nominated
1999	44th Filmfare Awards	Best Supporting Actor	Om Puri	Nominated
1999	44th Filmfare Awards	Best Music Director	Jatin–Lalit	Nominated
1999	44th Filmfare Awards	Best Female Playback Singer	Jaspinder Narula for "Pyaar To Hona Hi Tha"	Won
1999	Screen Awards	Best Female Playback Singer	Jaspinder Narula for "Pyaar To Hona Hi Tha"	Won
1999	Screen Awards	Best Music Director	Jatin–Lalit	Nominated
1999	Zee Cine Awards	Best Music Director	Jatin–Lalit	Nominated
