= List of Hindi films of 1999 =

A list of films produced by the Bollywood film industry based in Mumbai in 1999.

Salman Khan was the lead actor in 3 of the 5 highest-grossing films of that year.

== Box office collection ==
Top 10 highest-grossing Bollywood films of 1999.

Rank	Title	Director	Producer	Worldwide collection
1	Hum Saath-Saath Hain	Sooraj Barjatya	Rajshri Productions	₹81.71 Crore
2	Hum Dil De Chuke Sanam	Sanjay Leela Bhansali	Jhamu Sughand	₹51.38 Crore
3	Taal	Subhash Ghai	Mukta Arts	₹51.15 Crore
4	Biwi No.1	David Dhawan	Vashu Bhagnani	₹49.81 Crore
5	Hum Aapke Dil Mein Rehte Hain	Satish Kaushik	Suresh Productions	₹36.65 Crore
6	Mann	Indra Kumar	Maruti International; Shemaroo Entertainment	₹35.45 Crore
7	Sarfarosh	John Matthew Matthan	Cinematt Pictures	₹33.46 Crore
8	Baadshah	Abbas–Mustan	United Sevens	₹31.60 Crore
9	Kachche Dhaage	Milan Luthria	Tips Films	₹28.87 Crore
10	Haseena Maan Jaayegi	David Dhawan	Smita Thackeray	₹27.16 Crore

== Released films (A-Z) ==
Title	Director	Cast	Genre
Aaag Hi Aag	T. L. V. Prasad	Mithun Chakraborty, Jackie Shroff, Sneha	Action
Aa Ab Laut Chalen	Rishi Kapoor	Rajesh Khanna, Akshaye Khanna, Aishwarya Rai, Kader Khan, Jaspal Bhatti, Satish Kaushik, Moushumi Chatterji, Himani Shivpuri	Romance, Drama,
Aarzoo	Lawrence D'Souza	Akshay Kumar, Madhuri Dixit, Saif Ali Khan, Amrish Puri	Drama
Aaya Toofan	Deepak Balraj Vij	Mithun Chakraborty, Aditya Pancholi	Action, Adventure
Anari No.1	Sandesh Kohli	Govinda, Raveena Tandon, Simran Bagga, Kader Khan, Satish Shah, Aruna Irani	Comedy
Arjun Pandit	Rahul Rawail	Sunny Deol, Juhi Chawla, Saurabh Shukla	Action
Baadshah	Abbas–Mustan	Shah Rukh Khan, Twinkle Khanna, Deepshikha, Prem Chopra, Amrish Puri, Johnny Lever	Action, Comedy
Bade Dilwala	Shakeel Noorani	Sunil Shetty, Priya Gill, Paresh Rawal	Action
Benaam	T. L. V. Prasad	Mithun Chakraborty, Aditya Pancholi, Payal Malhotra	Action
Bhoot Ka Darr	S. Gawli	Rajesh Vivek, Sapna	Thriller
Bhopal Express	Mahesh Mathai	Naseeruddin Shah, Kay Kay Menon, Nethra Raghuraman, Zeenat Aman	Drama
Biwi No.1	David Dhawan	Salman Khan, Karisma Kapoor, Sushmita Sen, Anil Kapoor, Tabu, Saif Ali Khan	Comedy
Chalo America	Piyush Jha	Aashish Chaudhary, Deven Bhojani	Comedy
Chandaal Aatma	S.R. Pratap	Aparna, Rakesh Bedi, Sudhir Dalvi	Horror
Chehraa	Gautam Adhikari	Seema Kapoor, Ayub Khan, Madhoo	Romance, Drama
Chudail No. 1	R. Kumar	Shehzad Khan, Razak Khan	Horror
Daag	Raj Kanwar	Sanjay Dutt, Chandrachur Singh, Mahima Chaudhry	Action, Romance
Dahek	Lateef Binny	Akshaye Khanna, Sonali Bendre, Danny Denzongpa, Ahmed Khan	Drama
Dil Kya Kare	Prakash Jha	Ajay Devgn, Kajol, Mahima Chaudhry, Chandrachur Singh	Drama
Dillagi	Sunny Deol	Sunny Deol, Bobby Deol, Urmila Matondkar, Parvin Dabas, Preity Zinta	Drama
Double Gadbad		Navneet Nishan, Baba Sehgal	Comedy
Dracula	Bhooshan Lal	Sadashiv Amrapurkar, Ashna, Mohan Joshi	Horror
Dubashi (The Translator)	K. Hariharan	Raja Krishnamoorthy, Dhaneshwar Rao, B. S. Karthik	Children's
Dulhan Banoo Main Teri	Anoop Kumar	Faraaz Khan, Deepti Bhatnagar	Romance, Drama
Gair	Ashok Gaekwad	Ajay Devgn, Raveena Tandon, Reena Roy, Amrish Puri	Action
Ganga Ki Kasam	T. L. V. Prasad	Mithun Chakraborty, Jackie Shroff, Dipti Bhatnagar	Action
Godmother	Vinay Shukla	Shabana Azmi, Milind Gunaji, Nirmal Pandey	Crime, Drama
Haseena Maan Jaayegi	David Dhawan	Govinda, Sanjay Dutt, Karisma Kapoor, Pooja Batra, Kader Khan	Comedy
Heeralal Pannalal	Kawal Sharma	Mithun Chakraborty, Johnny Lever, Payal Malhotra	Drama, Action, Comedy, Crime
Hello Brother	Sohail Khan	Salman Khan, Rani Mukerji, Arbaaz Khan, Shakti Kapoor	Comedy
Hindustan Ki Kasam	Veeru Devgan	Amitabh Bachchan, Ajay Devgn, Manisha Koirala, Sushmita Sen, Prem Chopra	Patriotic, Action
Hogi Pyaar Ki Jeet	P. Vasu	Ajay Devgn, Neha, Arshad Warsi	Romance, Drama
Hote Hote Pyar Ho Gaya	Firoz Irani	Jackie Shroff, Kajol, Atul Agnihotri, Ayesha Jhulka	Drama
Hu Tu Tu	Gulzar	Nana Patekar, Sunil Shetty, Tabu	Drama
Hum Aapke Dil Mein Rehte Hain	Satish Kaushik	Kajol, Anil Kapoor, Anupam Kher, Johny Lever	Romantic drama
Hum Dil De Chuke Sanam	Sanjay Leela Bhansali	Salman Khan, Ajay Devgn, Aishwarya Rai	Drama
Hum Saath-Saath Hain	Sooraj R. Barjatya	Salman Khan, Mohnish Bahl, Tabu, Saif Ali Khan, Karisma Kapoor, Sonali Bendre	Family Drama
Hum Tum Pe Marte Hain	Nabh Kumar Raju	Govinda, Urmila Matondkar	Romance, Drama
International Khiladi	Umesh Mehra	Akshay Kumar, Twinkle Khanna, Rajat Bedi	Action, Crime, Drama, Romance
Jaanam Samjha Karo	Andaleb Sulthapuri	Salman Khan, Urmila Matondkar, Monica Bedi	Romance, Drama
Jaanwar	Suneel Darshan	Akshay Kumar, Karisma Kapoor, Shilpa Shetty, Shakti Kapoor, Ashutosh Rana	Drama
Jahan Tum Le Chalo	Desh Deepak	Rana Jung Bahadur, Shail Chaturvedi, Sonali Kulkarni	Romance
Jai Hind	Manoj Kumar	Rishi Kapoor, Kunal Goswami, Shilpa Shirodkar, Pran	Action, Romance
Kaala Samrajya	Deepak Bahry	Sunil Shetty, Monica Bedi, Amrish Puri	Action
Kachche Dhaage	Milan Luthria	Ajay Devgn, Manisha Koirala, Saif Ali Khan, Namrata Shirodkar	Romance, Drama
Kahani Kismat Ki	Farogh Siddique	Laxmikant Berde, Mithun Chakraborty, Deepshika	Action
Kartoos	Mahesh Bhatt	Sanjay Dutt, Manisha Koirala, Jackie Shroff, Jaspal Bhatti	Action
Kaun?	Ram Gopal Varma	Urmila Matondkar, Manoj Bajpai, Sushanth Kumar	Thriller
Khoobsurat	Sanjay Chhel	Sanjay Dutt, Urmila Matondkar, Om Puri, Farida Jalal	Romance, Drama
Khooni Ilaaka:The Prohibited Area	Jitendra Chawda	Kishore Anand Bhanushali, Arif Khan, Anil Nagrath	Horror
Khoonkar Darinde	Teerat Singh	Shakti Kapoor, Deepak Shirke, Sapna	Horror
Khopdi: The Skull	Ramesh U. Lakhiani	Rajesh Bakshi, Vijay Solanki	Horror
Kohram	Mehul Kumar	Amitabh Bachchan, Tabu, Nana Patekar, Jaya Prada	Action
Laawaris	Shrikant Sharma	Akshaye Khanna, Manisha Koirala, Jackie Shroff, Dimple Kapadia	Drama
Lal Baadshah	K. C. Bokadia	Amitabh Bachchan, Shilpa Shetty, Manisha Koirala	Action
Last Train to Mahakali	Anurag Kashyap	Kay Kay Menon, Nivedita Bhattacharya	Thriller
Lo Main Aa Gaya	Mahesh Kothare	Vinay Anand, Laxmikant Berde, Prem Chopra	Action
Lohpurush	Hersh Kinnu	Dharmendra, Jaya Prada, Ashish Vidyarthi	
Maa Kasam	Ashok Gaekwad	Kasam Ali, Vikas Anand, Arjun	Action
Manchala	Jaiprakash Shaw	Vivek Mushran, Gauri Khopkar, Rakesh Bedi	Romance
Mann	Inder Kumar	Aamir Khan, Manisha Koirala, Anil Kapoor, Sharmila Tagore, Deepti Bhatnagar, Rani Mukerji	Romance, Drama
Mast	Ram Gopal Varma	Aftab Shivdasani, Urmila Matondkar, Antara Mali	Romance, Drama
Mother	Saawan Kumar	Jeetendra, Rekha, Randhir Kapoor	Comedy, Drama, Family
Munnibai	Kanti Shah	Dharmendra, Mohan Joshi, Johnny Lever	Action
Murdaa Ghar	Kishan Shah	Shakti Kapoor, Jyoti Rana	Horror
Naukar Ki Kameez	Mani Kaul	Samir Ahmed, Vikrishnah Batt, Anu Joseph	Drama
Nyaydaata	Vicky Ranawat	Tinnu Anand, Aparajita, Asrani	Action
Phir Kabhi	Balwant Dullat	Rahul Roy, Saraf Deepak, Farah Naaz	Drama, Family
Phool Aur Aag	T. L. V. Prasad	Mithun Chakraborty, Jackie Shroff, Archana	Drama, Action, Comedy, Crime
Putlibai	Yash Chouhan	Rajesh Bakshi, Raj Kiran, Raza Murad	
Pyaar Koi Khel Nahin	Subhash Sehgal	Sunny Deol, Mahima Chaudhry, Apoorva Agnihotri, Mohnish Bahl	Drama
Pyaar Mein Kabhi Kabhi	Raj Kaushal	Sanjay Suri, Dino Morea, Rinke Khanna	Romance
Rajaji	Vimal Kumar	Govinda, Raveena Tandon, Satish Kaushik	Comedy, Romance
Safari	Jyotin Goel	Sanjay Dutt, Juhi Chawla, Mohnish Bahl, Tanuja, Suresh Oberoi	Action
Samar	Shyam Benegal	Seema Biswas, Ravi Jhankal, Rajeshwari Sachdev	Drama
Sangharsh	Tanuja Chandra	Akshay Kumar, Preity Zinta, Alia Bhatt, Ashutosh Rana	Thriller, Drama
Sanyasi Mera Naam	Imran Khalid	Mithun Chakraborty, Siddharth Dhawan, Mohan Joshi	Action
Sarfarosh	John Matthew Matthan	Aamir Khan, Sonali Bendre, Nawazuddin Siddiqui, Naseeruddin Shah, Upasna Singh, Mukesh Rishi	Action, Thriller
Sarfarosh-E-Hind	D. R. Kaushal	Ishrat Ali, Sadashiv Amrapurkar, Arun Bakshi	Action
Sautela	T. Rama Rao	Vinay Anand, Mithun Chakraborty, Gulshan Grover	Action
Shaheed Udham Singh	Chitraarth	Gurdas Maan, Raj Babbar	Drama
Shera	T. L. V. Prasad	Mithun Chakraborty, Pinky Chinoy, Asrani	Action
Shool	E. Nivas	Manoj Bajpai, Raveena Tandon, Sayaji Shinde	Action, Crime
Sikandar Sadak Ka	T. L. V. Prasad	Mithun Chakraborty, Manek Bedi, Samrat Mukerji, Monica Bedi	Drama
Silsila Hai Pyar Ka	Shrabrani Deodar	Chandrachur Singh, Karisma Kapoor, Danny Denzongpa, Aruna Irani	Romance
Sirf Tum	Agathiyan	Sanjay Kapoor, Jackie Shroff, Sushmita Sen, Priya Gill, Salman Khan	Romance
Sooryavansham	E. V. V. Satyanarayana	Amitabh Bachchan, Jayasudha, Soundarya, Rachana Banerjee	Drama
Split Wide Open	Dev Benegal	Rahul Bose, Laila Rouass, Shivaji Satam, Ayesha Dharker	Social Drama
Taal	Subhash Ghai	Akshaye Khanna, Anil Kapoor, Aishwarya Rai, Alok Nath	Musical, Romance
Tabaahi-The Destroyer	Gopi Sapru	Mithun Chakraborty, Divya Dutta, Satyendra Kapoor	Action
Thakshak	Govind Nihlani	Ajay Devgn, Tabu, Rahul Bose, Amrish Puri, Nethra Raghuraman	Drama
Trishakti	Madhur Bhandarkar	Sadashiv Amrapurkar, Milind Gunaji, Jatin Kanakia	Action
Vaastav: The Reality	Mahesh Manjrekar	Sanjay Dutt, Namrata Shirodkar	Crime, Drama
Yeh Hai Mumbai Meri Jaan	Mahesh Bhatt	Saif Ali Khan, Twinkle Khanna	Drama
Zulmi	Sandesh Kohli	Akshay Kumar, Twinkle Khanna	Action, Romance

== See also ==
- List of Hindi films of 2000
- List of Hindi films of 1998
