= Shakti Kapoor filmography =

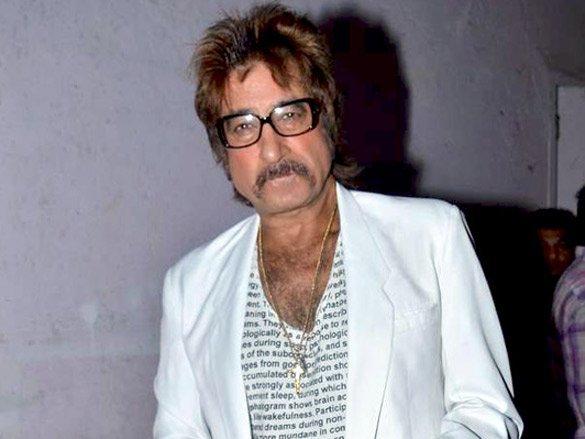
Kapoor in 2011

Shakti Kapoor (born 3 September 1952) is an Indian actor and comedian who appears in Bollywood films. Kapoor is mostly known for playing villainous and comical characters. In a career spanning over three decades, Kapoor has appeared in more than 700 films.

== Hindi films ==
Year	Title	Role
1975	Ranjit Khanal	Anand
1977	Khel Khilari Ka	Tony
1977	Kasam Khoon Ki	Johny
1977	Alibaba Marjinaa	Nasir
1978	Dil Se Mile Dil	Peter
1978	Darwaza	Goga
1979	Sargam	Prakash
1979	Jaani Dushman	Man on a horse with bride
1980	Yaari Dushmani	Bandit
1980	Nazrana Pyar Ka	Prem Kishen
1980	Ganga Dham	
1980	Morchha	
1980	Bambai Ka Maharaja	
1980	Aasha	Mr. Shakti (Guest appearance)
1980	Lootmaar	Pratap
1980	Qurbani	Vikram Singh
1980	Kismet	Jeevan
1981	Poonam	Vinod
1981	Kaatilon Ka Katil	Jimmy/Michael
1981	Chhade Malang	Punjabi film as Hero
1981	Naseeb	Ashok
1981	Wardaat	Shakti
1981	Rocky	R.D.
1981	Dhanwan	
1981	Yeh Rishta Na Tootay	Shakti
1981	Sahhas	Billa
1981	Tajurba	
1981	Khuda Kasam	Khanna
1981	Armaan	
1981	Aapas Ki Baat	Shyam Shrivastav
1981	Meri Aawaz Suno	Azad
1981	Be Shaque	Mohan
1982	Kacche Heere	Salim
1982	Gumsum	
1982	Heeron Ka Chor	Rana
1982	Dil Hi Dil Mein	Mr. Verma
1982	Satte Pe Satta	Mangal Anand
1982	Apna Bana Lo	Paul
1982	Badle Ki Aag	Dacoit Kallu (uncredited)
1982	Waqt Ke Shehzade	Shakti Singh
1982	Swami Dada	Jaggu
1982	Mehndi	Shakti Ratan Singh
1983	Main Awara Hoon	Kundan
1983	Kaise Kaise Log	Bankhelal
1983	Humse Na Jeeta Koi	Girdhari's prospective son-in-law
1983	Hero	Jimmy Thapa
1983	Chor Police	Tony
1983	Himmatwala	Shakti N. Gopaldas
1983	Mahaan	Prem
1983	Jaani Dost	Nagendra
1983	Jeet Hamaari	Vijay
1983	Justice Chaudhary	Jay Singh/Shanker Singh
1983	Qayamat	Kaalia
1983	Mawaali	Ranjit
1984	Zakhmi Sher	Arsonist
1984	Yeh Desh	Dharamdas
1984	Tarkeeb	
1984	Shapath	Shakti
1984	Raja Aur Rana	Shakti Singh
1984	Qaidi	Sudarshan Lal
1984	Mera Faisla	Tony
1984	Kanoon Meri Mutthi Mein	
1984	Kaamyaab	
1984	Jeene Nahi Dunga	Shakti Singh
1984	All Rounder	Vikram
1984	Akalmand	Shakti
1984	Inquilaab	Koya Koya Atachi/Richard Lewis
1984	Tohfa	Kamesh Singh
1984	Ghar Ek Mandir	Shera
1984	Maqsad	Nagpal
1984	Baazi	Rocky
1984	Insaaf Kaun Karega	Paltu
1984	Inteha	
1984	Haisiyat	Ravi
1984	Hum Hain Lajawab	B.K. Shrivastava
1985	Zulm Ka Badla	Jagdish Kumar 'JK'/Sangram Singh
1985	Yaar Kasam	
1985	Shiva Ka Insaaf	Jaggan
1985	Phaansi Ke Baad	Abbas Mohammad Riyaz
1985	Patthar Dil	Do Rangi
1985	Mera Saathi	Bansi Das
1985	Karishma Kudrat Ka	Bhagad Singh
1985	Hoshiyar	Malpani's son
1985	Ameer Aadmi Gharib Aadmi	
1985	Aaj Ka Daur	Leo
1985	Mera Jawab	Danny
1985	Do Dilon Ki Dastaan	Shekhar
1985	Rahi Badal Gaye	Vikram Mehra 'Vicky'
1985	Balidaan	Johnny 'Chotey'
1985	Pataal Bhairavi	Hanuman (Ramu's friend)
1985	Yaadon Ki Kasam	
1985	Masterji	Bholashankar
1985	Mohabbat	Atmaram
1985	Bhago Bhut Aaya	Jagjit/Mangal Singh
1985	Pyari Behna	Nekiram Chaturvedi
1985	Baadal	Vikram Singh
1985	Wafadaar	Prasad
1985	Geraftaar	Chutkiram
1985	Insaaf Main Karoonga	Safar Khan
1986	Singhasan	Uggra Rao
1986	Palay Khan	British Officer Gulbar Khan
1986	Mera Haque	Dhartiprasad
1986	Mera Dharam	Bhawar Singh Danga
1986	Jeeva	Lakhan
1986	Ghar Sansar	Ringo
1986	Dosti Dushmani	Kamal
1986	Baat Ban Jaye	Ravi/Ashok Khanna
1986	Woman	
1986	Angaarey	Mr. Jolly
1986	Aag Aur Shola	Nagesh
1986	Kaanch Ki Deewar	Vikram Singh
1986	Dilwala	King Kong
1986	Sultanat	Shakkir
1986	Dharm Adhikari	Chottey Chaudhary
1986	Pahunchey Hue Log	Vicky
1986	Karamdaata	Ajit
1986	Jaanbaaz	Raja
1986	Muddat	Jailor Kripal Singh
1986	Karma	Jagga/Jolly
1986	Mazloom	Barrister Rakesh
1986	Asli Naqli	Shakti Singh
1986	Khel Mohabbat Ka	Ranjeet
1987	Watan Ke Rakhwale	Koya Koya Attache
1987	Sitapur Ka Geeta	Thakur Bahadur Singh
1987	Parivaar	Avinash
1987	Marte Dam Tak	Ricku
1987	Mard Ki Zabaan	Monty
1987	Insaniyat Ke Dushman	Shakti Singh
1987	Aag Hi Aag	Gangua
1987	Madadgaar	Kader
1987	Dance Dance	Resham
1987	Insaaf	Police Inspector Laxman Bhinde
1987	Satyamev Jayate	Chaman Bagga
1987	Hiraasat	Sippy
1987	Sindoor	Shera
1987	Jaan Hatheli Pe	Rocky
1987	Hifazat	Lakhan
1987	Himmat Aur Mehanat	Mahesh Chand
1987	Insaaf Ki Pukar	Dinesh Lal
1987	Superman	Verma
1988	Sone Pe Suhaaga	Joginder
1988	Saazish	
1988	Qatil	Anand Verma
1988	Pyar Mohabbat	
1988	Mar Mitenge	Manjit Singh
1988	Inteqam	Jacob
1988	Bees Saal Baad	Tantrik Baba
1988	Aage Ki Soch	
1988	Dariya Dil	D.O. Gogi
1988	Paap Ki Duniya	Kisna
1988	Pyar Ka Mandir	Dilip
1988	Charnon Ki Saugandh	Shakti Singh
1988	Khatron Ke Khiladi	Jaichand
1988	Ram-Avtar	Gundappa Swami
1988	Commando	Mirza
1988	Waqt Ki Awaz	Makhan S. Thakkar
1988	Halaal Ki Kamai	Robert
1988	Vijay	Suresh Badanpati
1988	Paap Ko Jalaa Kar Raakh Kar Doonga	Shaadilal
1988	Do Waqt Ki Roti	Thakur Shakti Singh
1989	Nishane Baazi	
1989	Paanch Paapi	Choos Lee
1989	Sachai Ki Taqat	Dr. Narendra
1989	Kahan Hai Kanoon	Police Inspector Shakti Singh
1989	Nafrat Ki Aandhi	Chotu
1989	Mahaadev	Police Inspector Sharma
1989	Taaqatwar	Munjal Khurana
1989	Mujrim	Chandan
1989	Hum Intezaar Karenge	Kundan
1989	Guru	Vicky
1989	Gharana	Durlabh/ Hatoda
1989	Daav Pench	Dhurjan
1989	Gharana	
1989	Joshilaay	
1989	Mil Gayi Manzil Mujhe	
1989	Kasam Suhaag Ki	
1989	Suryaa	Ratan Chaudhary
1989	Touheen	Bihari
1989	Rakhwala	Police Inspector Dharam Raj
1989	Garibon Ka Daata	Kamlesh Singh
1989	Jaisi Karni Waisi Bharni	Vijay Verma
1989	Abhimanyu	Pannalal 'Panni' Double Horse Power
1989	Ustaad	Shakti Singh
1989	Jungbaaz	Numbridas
1989	Aakhri Ghulam	Banwarilal
1989	Gentleman	Shakti
1989	Aag Se Khelna	Shakha
1989	Chaalbaaz	Batuknath Lalan Prasad Maalpani/Balma
1990	Pyar Ka Devta	Dilip
1990	Majboor	Janki Das
1990	Maha-Sangram	Babu Kasai Hyderabadi
1990	Baap Numbri Beta Dus Numbri	Prasad
1990	Pyar Ka Karz	Lalji
1990	Jeene Do	Inspector Himmat Singh
1990	Izzatdaar	Jedha Shankar
1990	Amiri Garibi	Sher Singh
1990	Gunahon Ka Devta	Fake Inspector Bhinde
1990	Veeru Dada	Jagraj
1990	Jamai Raja	Shakti
1990	Baaghi: A Rebel for Love	Dhanraj
1990	Aag Ka Gola	Inspector Popat Lal
1991	Nachnewala Gaanewale	Maggu
1991	Paap Ki Aandhi	Inspector/DCP Dilawar
1991	Qurbani Rang Layegi	Vicky (Singer)
1991	Mast Kalandar	Inspector Sher Singh
1991	Khoon Ka Karz	Inspector P.K. Lele
1991	Shankara	Popatlal Frockwala
1991	Kasam Kali Ki	Jagirdar Shakti Singh
1991	Do Matwale	Sampath/Champath/Ganpath
1991	Yeh Aag Kab Bujhegi	Mohan Agarwal
1991	Karz Chukana Hai	Seth Usman
1991	Pyar Hua Chori Chori	Bishamber
1991	Izzat	Police Constable Kale Khan
1991	Trinetra	Ghanshyam
1991	Dharam Sankat	Insp. Heeralal
1991	Veerta	Raghuveer
1991	Maa	Murli Manohar Khanna
1991	Yaara Dildara	Ramaiya
1991	Jhoothi Shaan	Kuldip
1992	Kisme Kitna Hai Dum	Shaitan Singh
1992	Priya	
1992	Parasmani	Kanhaiya
1992	Payal	Dr. Shakti Kapoor
1992	Siyasat	
1992	Basanti Tangewali	
1992	Bol Radha Bol	Gunga / Inspector Bhende
1992	Ganga Ka Vachan	Khan
1992	Nagin Aur Lootere	Tantrik
1992	Shola Aur Shabnam	Boxer Deva (uncredited)
1992	Insaaf Ki Devi	Suraj Prakash
1992	Mere Sajana Saath Nibhana	Bhola
1992	Suryavanshi	Rajguru
1992	Adharm	Makhan Singh
1992	Sahebzaade	Thakur Bhanu Pratap
1992	Virodhi	Pratap
1992	Sarphira	Rocky
1992	Zindagi Ek Jua	Shakti Dholakia
1992	Tyagi	Choudhary Shakti G. Dayal
1992	Khiladi	Suresh Malhotra
1992	Ganga Bani Shola	
1992	Honeymoon	Dr. Nainsukh
1992	Zulm Ki Hukumat	Yeshwant Kohli
1992	Isi Ka Naam Zindagi	Zamindar Dhanraj/Devraj
1992	Ghar Jamai	Ramesh
1992	Geet	Hari Saxena
1992	Umar 55 Ki Dil Bachpan Ka	Govindram
1993	Dosti Ki Saugandh	
1993	Bechain	
1993	15th August	Ramu
1993	Bomb Blast	Additional Police Commissioner Sherkhan
1993	Phoolan Hasina Ramkali	Bahadur
1993	Insaniyat Ke Devta	Thakur Shakti Singh
1993	Divya Shakti	Bharat Acharya
1993	Baaghi Sultana	Special appearance
1993	Aankhen	Tejeshwar
1993	Muqabla	Khanna
1993	Krishan Avtaar	Maqsood Patel
1993	Phool	Munna
1993	Pardesi	Lala
1993	Police Wala	Ravindra Chakravorty (Ranu Dada)
1993	Aag Ka Toofan	
1993	Aadmi	I.G.P. Pratap Singh
1993	Dil Tera Aashiq	Black Eye
1993	Dalaal	Seth Jun Jun Wala
1993	Aulad Ke Dushman	Dindayal Bhargav
1993	Dhanwaan	Banarasi
1993	Aakhri Chetawani	
1993	Shatranj	Robin D. Verma
1993	Teri Payal Mere Geet	Benni
1994	Aag Aur Chingari	
1994	Ganga Aur Ranga	
1994	Do Fantoosh	Laxman
1994	Zamane Se Kya Darna	Shakti G. Singh/Vicky V. Singh
1994	Raja Babu	Nandu/Veeru
1994	Madam X	Champak Lal
1994	Prem Shakti	Hoshiyar Singh
1994	Khuddar	Adarsh Vardhan
1994	Laadla	Tilak Bhandari
1994	Chauraha	Insp. Bankelal
1994	Anokha Premyudh	
1994	Andaz	Shagun
1994	Aatish: Feel the Fire	Sunny
1994	Eena Meena Deeka	Kali-Beggar
1994	Aag	Police Inspector Suryadev Singh
1994	Kranti Kshetra	Prem Pardeshi, college professor
1994	Prem Yog	Gulshan
1994	Main Khiladi Tu Anari	Goli
1994	Stuntman	Roop 'Rocky' P. Kumar
1994	Andaz Apna Apna	Crime Master Gogo
1994	Mr. Azaad	Garg
1995	Ravan Raaj: A True Story	Auto Kesariya
1995	Jallad	Shakti Jackson
1995	Imtihaan	Shekhar
1995	Bewafa Sanam	Jailor Zalim Singh
1995	Hathkadi	Bhawani Shankar
1995	Maidan-E-Jung	Banarasi
1995	Taqdeerwala	Chota Ravan
1995	Teenmoti	
1995	Coolie No. 1	Goverdhan
1995	Dance Party	Rocky
1995	Sanjay	Pratap Singh
1995	Yaraana	Bankha
1995	Diya Aur Toofan	Madanlal
1996	Papi Gudia	Charandas (Channi)
1996	Namak	Jagdish R. Nath
1996	Jurmana	J.J.
1996	Jaan	Banwari
1996	Ek Tha Raja	Lakhpat
1996	Dil Tera Diwana	Ambani
1996	Apne Dam Par	Ranjit Saxena
1996	Saajan Chale Sasural	Singer/Musician
1996	Loafer	Bhiku-Ravi's Mama
1996	Krishna	Raja
1996	Mr. Bechara	Mr. Natwarlal 'Romeo'
1996	Bal Brahmachari	Chote Chaudhary
1996	Diljale	Rajasaheb/Mantri
1996	Beqabu	
1996	Hum Hain Khalnayak	Tikka Singh/Shakti Singh
1996	Khilona	Ronny
1997	Shapath	Havaldar Shakti Singh
1997	Sanam	Angara
1997	Naseeb	Lalli
1997	Kaun Rokega Mujhe	
1997	Jayate (TV movie)	Advocate S. Kapoor
1997	Itihaas	Navlakhi/Dholu
1997	Moner Manush	Major
1997	Daadagiri	ACP Pratap Sinha
1997	Bhoot Bhungla	Thakur
1997	Bhai Bhai	Goga
1997	Bhai	Bharat
1997	Banarasi Babu	Manchala
1997	Aakhri Sanghursh	Vijay
1997	Judwaa	Rangeela
1997	Hero No. 1	Babu
1997	Jeevan Yudh	Rani's accomplice
1997	Zameer: The Awakening of a Soul	Chedhi Lal
1997	Mahaanta: The Film	Inspector Dubey
1997	Mere Sapno Ki Rani	Mamaji
1997	Prithvi	Dabu
1997	Betaabi	Ajmera
1997	Deewana Mastana	Neha's Uncle
1997	Loha	Mustafa
1998	Zanjeer	
1998	Gunda	Chutiya
1998	Chhota Chetan	Baba Khondol
1998	Barsaat Ki Raat	
1998	Miss 420	CBI Chief
1998	Keemat: They Are Back	Lala Bhajanlal
1998	Maharaja	Bhalu Prasad Bihari Orey
1998	Zulm-O-Sitam	Imli Dada
1998	Bandhan	Billu
1998	Hero Hindustani	Cadbury
1998	Mehndi	Banne Miya
1998	Himmatwala	Chandra Prakash Kanyal
1999	Hum Aapke Dil Mein Rehte Hain	Khairati Lal
1999	Daag: The Fire	Dr. Anand
1999	Lal Baadshah	Balu (Lal's Secretary)
1999	Jaanam Samjha Karo	Harry
1999	Silsila Hai Pyar Ka	Rakesh Nath/Roxy
1999	Rajaji	Dhanpat Rai
1999	Sar Kati Laash	Shakti
1999	Hindustan Ki Kasam	Verma
1999	Hello Brother	Khanna
1999	Murdaa Ghar	
1999	Heera Lal Panna Lal	Motiwala's Edler Brother
1999	Khopdi: The Skull	
1999	Hum Saath-Saath Hain: We Stand United	Anwar
1999	Jaanwar	Sultan
1999	Madam Don	CBI Officer
2000	Tune Mera Dil Le Liyaa	K.K. (Kishan Kanhaiya)
2000	Shikaar	Badri Nath
2000	Saugandh	
2000	Meri Jung Ka Elaan	Gadar Singh
2000	Justice Chowdhary	Dogra
2000	Jallad No. 1	Shinde
2000	Dalaal No.1	Shakti 'Dalaal'
2000	Bhai Thakur	Thakur Diwan Singh
2000	Sultana Mera Naam	
2000	Aaj Ka Ravan	
2000	Heerabai	
2000	Daku Ganga Jamuna	
2000	Bulandi	Jagannath
2000	Phir Bhi Dil Hai Hindustani	Ramakant Dua
2000	Daku Ramkali	Abu alu
2000	Baaghi	
2000	Chal Mere Bhai	Sapna's uncle (Mamaji)
2000	Hum To Mohabbat Karega	Ketu
2000	Har Dil Jo Pyar Karega...	Abdul's uncle
2000	Dhaai Akshar Prem Ke	Pritam Grewal
2000	Jis Desh Mein Ganga Rehta Hain	Avinash (Ganga's biological dad)
2000	Aakhri Dacait	
2000	Kahin Pyaar Na Ho Jaaye	Panditji
2000	Kaali Ki Saugandh	Thakur Gajraj Singh
2001	Shiva Ka Insaaf	
2001	Meri Adaalat	Drunk Police Inspector
2001	Inteqam	Mohan Seth
2001	Bombay Girls	Chitrasen
2001	Bengal Tiger	Rukavat Singh
2001	Arjun Devaa	Bade Thakur Jagawar Choudhry
2001	Aaj Ka Gunda	
2001	Zubeidaa	Dance Master Hiralal
2001	Jagira	
2001	Jodi No.1	Insp. Shakti Singh (Mumbai)
2001	Uljhan	Pawan
2001	Ek Rishtaa: The Bond of Love	Ladoo Mama
2001	Mujhe Meri Biwi Se Bachaao	
2001	Ittefaq	ACP Rathod
2001	Indian	Rahim's father
2001	Ehsaas: The Feeling	Principal
2001	Aamdani Atthanni Kharcha Rupaiya	Dhoklu
2001	Style	Suren Bhagwat
2001	Mawali No.1	
2001	Meri Aagosh Mein	
2002	Marshal	Damodar
2002	Haan Maine Bhi Pyaar Kiya	Chinni
2002	Ab Ke Baras	BMW
2002	23rd March 1931: Shaheed	Chattar Singh
2002	Akhiyon Se Goli Maare	Shakti Dada
2002	Hathyar	Hasan Bhai
2002	Waah! Tera Kya Kehna	Dilip Oberoi
2002	Reshma aur Sultan	
2003	Humein Tumse Pyar Ho Gaya Chupke Chupke	Dildar Singh
2003	Dangerous Night	
2003	Anubhav: An Experience	Public Prosecutor
2003	Tujhe Meri Kasam	Kailash
2003	Talaash: The Hunt Begins...	Upadhyay
2003	Pran Jaaye Par Shaan Na Jaaye	
2003	Hungama	'Raddiwala' Tejabhai alias Kachara Seth
2004	Shola: Fire of Love	Police Inspector
2004	Suno Sasurjee	Kiran's brother-in-law
2004	Poochho Mere Dil Se	Major Khan
2004	Shikaar	Chhadha
2004	Taarzan: The Wonder Car	Mahesh Saxena
2004	Shart: The Challenge	Dilbaugh
2004	Ek Se Badhkar Ek	Inspector Kaate
2004	Hulchul	Kashinath
2004	Musafir	Whacko Jacko
2004	Smile Please	
2005	Jurm	Chamanlal
2005	Garam	
2005	Qatal-E-Aam	
2005	Zameer: The Fire Within	Dildar
2005	Barsaat	Mr. Virwani
2005	Raja Bhai Lagey Raho...	Dhiru — Beggar
2005	Dosti: Friends Forever	Bharucha
2006	Tom, Dick, and Harry	Inspector P.K. Waghmare
2006	Bold	John
2006	Love In Japan	Bangha
2006	Rafta Rafta – The Speed	Johnny Englandia
2006	Malamaal Weekly	Joseph
2006	Umar	Prem Lakha
2006	Souten: The Other Woman	Sumer Singh
2006	Chup Chup Ke	Natwar
2006	Shaadi Karke Phas Gaya Yaar	Mr. Kapoor
2006	Bhagam Bhag	Guru — Anjali's uncle
2007	Nehlle Pe Dehlla	Balram 'Balu' Sahni
2007	Bombay to Goa	A.C.P Shakti Singh
2007	Nach Baliye 3 (TV mini-series)	Jodi 4
2007	Janam Janam Ke Saath	
2008	Jimmy	Inspector Battu Singh Tobar Patialewala
2008	Hastey Hastey - Follow Your Heart	Tony
2008	Don Muthu Swami	Noora
2008	Woodstock Villa	Chawla
2008	Khushboo	Chugh
2008	Rafoo Chakkar: Fun on the Run	Hasmukh
2008	Khallballi!	Bhadak Singh
2009	Victoria House	Guru
2009	The Hero - Abhimanyu	Garudnarayan Choudhary
2009	The Game of Love	Advocate
2009	Kisse Pyaar Karon?	A.K. 47
2009	Baabarr	Sarfaraz Qurishi
2009	Meri Life Mein Uski Wife	Padam Kumar Lele
2009	Hum Hain Hero Hindustani (Bhojpuri)	Mayalaisa girl broker
2009	De Dana Dan	Moosa Hirapurwala / Zubair Ahmed
2010	Teen Patti	Prem London
2010	Mr. Bhatti on Chhutti	Tourist
2010	Malik Ek	Kulkarni
2010	No Problem	Police Commissioner Khurana
2010	Toofan	Pandit
2011	Naughty @ 40	Sharafat Ali
2011	Bin Bulaye Baraati	Ajay Prakash
2013	Deewana Main Deewana	Basant Kumar
2014	Love U Crazy Girl	
2014	Mr Joe B. Carvalho	Khurrana
2015	Mumbai Can Dance Saala	Rocky
2015	Main Hoon Rajinikanth	Bachchan
2015	Ishq Ka Manjan	K.K.
2016	Kyaa Kool Hain Hum 3	Mausa
2016	Bhouri	Doctor
2016	Fillam	
2017	Raktdhar	Rani
2018	Dosti Zindabad	
2018	The Journey of Karma	Mahek D. Shukla
2019	Life Mein Time Nahin Kisi Ko	
2020	Shimla Mirchi	Captain Uncle
2023	Animal	PK Mishra COO of Swastik Steel
2025	Mere Husband Ki Biwi	

== Other languages ==
Year	Title	Role	Language	Ref.
1986	Kaliyuga Pandavulu	Karamchand	Telugu	
1988	Yuddha Bhoomi	Soldier in Indian Army along with Chiranjeevi	Telugu	
1990	Badnam	Kesto	Bengali	
2000	Jamin Nai	Inspector Sadek	Bangladeshi	
2001	Eri Naam Dosti	Surma Sawdagor	Bangladeshi	
2002	Make Up		Kannada	
2003	Bahudibe Mo Jaga Balia	Rudra Pratap Rai	Odia	
2009	Hum Hain Hero Hindustani	Broker	Bhojpuri	
2010	Aika Dajiba	Khanna, Punjabi Relative	Marathi	
2011	Oru Marubhoomikkadha	Hosle The Boss	Malayalam	
2011	Pratikar	Broker (Main Villain)	Nepali	
2012	Rahe Chardi Kala Punjab Di		Punjabi	
2013	Sahasam	Sultan	Telugu	
2014	Marriage Da Garriage	Baldev	Punjabi	
2016	Chhati Tale Ding Dong	Shakti	Oriya	
2018	Shrestha Bangali		Bengali	
2019	Lucifer	Sanghani	Malayalam	
2025	L2: Empuraan	Sanghani	Malayalam	

== Television ==
Year	Title	Role	Notes
2007	Nach Baliye	Contestant	
2011	Bigg Boss 5	Contestant	
2019	Parchhayee	Prem Bahadur	
2022	Guilty Minds	Anwar	Episode: "Aalaap"
