= Jayendra =

Jayendra is a given name of Indian origin. People with that name include:

- Jayendra Saraswathi (1935-2018), 69th Shankaracharya Guru and head or pontiff (Pïțhādhipati) of the Kanchi Kamakoti Peetham
- Jayendra Shekhadiwala (born 1952), Gujarati poet, critic and professor
- Jayendra Thakur (born 1953), gangster from Vasai-Virar, Mumbai
