= Dangerous Night (film) =

Dangerous Night is a Hindi Horror film of Bollywood directed and produced by Muneer Khan. This film was released on 19 December 2003 under the banner of S.P. Films Creations.

== Cast ==
- Shakti Kapoor as Servant
- Raza Murad as Thakur
- Mac Mohan
- Rajesh Vivek
- Sapna (actress)
- Amit Pachori
- Satnam Kaur
- Anil Nagrath
- Ramesh Goyel
- Vinod Tripathi
- Muneer Khan
- Ali Khan

== Soundtrack ==
The music composer of the movie was Bappi Lahiri and Soumitra Lahiri, and the singers were Asha Bhosle, Alka Yagnik, Amit Kumar and Bappi Lahiri.
