= Kalyana Sougandhikam =

Kalyana Sougandhikam (lit. 'Marriage Vows') may refer to these Indian films:

- Kalyana Sougandhikam (1975 film), Malayalam film released in 1975 starring Vincent and Jayabharathi
- Kalyana Sougandhikam (1996 film), Malayalam film released in 1996 starring Dileep and Divya Unni

== See also ==
- Kalyan (disambiguation)
- Saugandh (disambiguation)
