= Sar Kati Laash =

Sar Kati Laash is a Hindi adult horror film of Bollywood directed by Teerat Singh and produced by Ajay Kumar. This film was released on 8 October 1999 in the banner of Atlanta Production. This film was dubbed in Bengali as Matha Kaata Laash.

== Plot ==
A newly married couple come to stay in a hotel to celebrate their honeymoon but the next morning they are found dead. It is revealed that an evil spirit appears as a beheaded ghost who rapes and kills women.

== Cast ==
- Shakti Kapoor as Shakti
- Deepak Shirke
- Sapna (actress)
- Rakesh Pandey
- Mac Mohan
- Arun Mathur
- Meghna
- Anmol
- Sakkhi
- Reshma
