= Daku Ganga Jamuna =

Hindi-language action drama film

Daku Ganga Jamuna is a Hindi-language action drama film directed by Kanti Shah and produced by Shakuntala Gohil. This film was released on 15 September 2000 in the banner of 5001 Films.

== Plot ==
This is a story of vendetta between Bhura and Jwala. Bhura kills Jwala and Jwala's daughter Jamuna oaths to take vengeance of the murder. She plans to kill Bhura as well as his daughter Ganga.

== Cast ==
- Shakti Kapoor as Karodmal
- Raza Murad as Daku Bhura Singh
- Sapna (actress) Daku Ganga
- Durgesh Nandini as Daku Jamuna
- Dinesh Hingoo as Pandit
- Joginder as Hakim Singh
- Mohan Joshi as Daku Jwala Singh
- Amit Pachori as Ajay Singh
- Anil Nagrath as Judge Saxena
