= Baadshah (1999 film) =

1999 Indian film by Abbas–Mustan

- Theatrical release poster
- Directed by: Abbas–Mustan
- Written by: Neeraj Vora; Shyam Goel
- Produced by: Ganesh Jain; Bhawar Jain; Girish Jain
- Starring: Shah Rukh Khan; Twinkle Khanna; Rakhee Gulzar; Amrish Puri; Johnny Lever; Razak Khan
- Cinematography: Thomas A. Xavier
- Edited by: Hussain A. Burmawala
- Music by: Songs: Anu Malik; Background Score: Surinder Sodhi
- Production company: Venus Movies
- Distributed by: B4U Films
- Release date: 27 August 1999
- Running time: 176 minutes
- Country: India
- Language: Hindi
- Budget: ₹11 crore
- Box office: ₹31.6 crore (equivalent to ₹148 crore or US$16 million in 2026)

Baadshah (transl. Emperor) is a 1999 Indian Hindi-language crime comedy film directed by Abbas–Mustan. The film stars Shah Rukh Khan and Twinkle Khanna in the lead roles and Amrish Puri, Rakhee Gulzar, Johnny Lever and Razak Khan in supporting roles. It was released on 27 August 1999. Khan earned a nomination for the Filmfare Award for Best Performance in a Comic Role for his performance in the film. The film's plot is loosely based on the 1995 American film Nick of Time.

== Plot ==
Raj a.k.a. Baadshah runs a detective agency out of a Bombay office full of cheesy detective gadgetry. He has a chief assistant Ramlal and other employees. Baadshah receives little business and is desperate for a big break.

Suraj Singh Thapar is a tycoon whose bio-chemical plant is being shut down by the Chief Minister of Goa, Gayatri Bachchan, following a major industrial accident. Thapar resolves to have her assassinated. His assistant Rani, hires Shiva, Mumbai's notorious contract-killer.

K. Jhunjhunwala comes to Baadshah with a strange case. He claims, he is dying of a brain tumor and wants to see his daughter Seema married to Nitin before he dies. Seema refuses to marry Nitin, hence the need for Baadshah's help. Baadshah woos Seema with lies and has her fall in love with him, only to dump her later. However, his feelings for her were genuine. Unbeknownst to Baadshah, Jhunjhunwala and Nitin are actually a father-son duo wanted by the CBI. The marriage of Nitin to Seema, who is actually the sister of CBI secret agent Deepak Malhotra, is meant to stop an investigation into their bank fraud case. The plan fails when Agent Malhotra arrests the Jhunjhunwalas.

Meanwhile, the assassination plot gets CBI attention after the chief reveals that Shiva is killed in a car accident. Fearing a second attempt, CBI tasks agent Malhotra to protect her. Malhotra is assigned the codename "Baadshah". Thapar learns of this and asks Rani and her boyfriend, Moti, to eliminate "Baadshah" and have Moti assume his identity to gain access to Bachchan and carry out the assassination. At the same time, Baadshah the detective takes a case from Mahendra Seth - Manichand and Saxena have kidnapped Seth's child for ransom. Baadshah and his friend are given tickets to Goa, where the child is being held.

Both "Baadshah"s are scheduled for the same flight. Agent Malhotra arrives at the ticket counter and Rani identifies him as Baadshah. Moti kills Malhotra. Baadshah comes up to the ticket counter and is mistakenly given the agent's business class ticket. Baadshah also finds Malhotra's fallen computer disk. Moti arrives at the ticket counter announcing himself as Baadshah and is given the real Baadshah's economy class ticket. During the flight, Rani realises Moti killed the wrong man. Seema and her partner Tom Uncle are at the Goa Airport expecting agent Malhotra but see Baadshah instead.

Baadshah meets CBI agent Aditya Chopra and thinks he works for Mahendra Seth while agent Chopra believes Baadshah is the secret CBI agent. They leave the airport and meet CBI Dr. Rusi Surti who gives Baadshah an assortment of top-secret gadgets and a James Bond-style car for assistance on his mission. They commend him for the way he solved the Jhunjhunwalas' case, which Baadshah is shocked to learn is regarding a bank fraud.

Back at the airport, Baadshah's friends are picked up by a driver posing for Mahendra Seth but he's employed by the kidnappers. Seema, who had been following Baadshah, arranges to meet with him. They meet and he apologizes to her about what happened before. They reconcile temporarily, Moti interrupts their conversation and Seema flees while Baadshah and Moti fight. Baadshah remembers that he previously saw Moti at the Mumbai Airport pushing a man in the wheelchair, who Moti admits he had killed.

Baadshah escapes and later receives a call from the kidnappers who ask him to exchange the diamonds for the child at Saint Paul School. Seema searches Baadshah's hotel room and finds the computer disk and takes it, unaware that Baadshah is watching her. She checks the disk and finds out that Thapar was behind the assassination attempt. Seema and Tom's Uncle now suspect Baadshah as the assassin.

Seeema heads to Thapar's club to meet Thapar, where Baadshah also shows up after following her. Thapar thinks Baadshah is the substitute that Rani arranged for, while Baadshah thinks Thapar works for Mahendra Seth. Baadshah tells Thapar that the work will be done the next day at Saint Paul School. Thapar thinks Baadshah is talking about the murder of Bachchan, who coincidentally has a program planned at Saint Paul School the next day as well.

Baadshah rescues the child and captures the criminal duo. He sends Ramlal and the others to an address given by Thapar. Baadshah thinks his friends will meet Thapar to return the diamonds and the child while Thapar thinks they have kidnapped Bachchan and are bringing her to him. Back at Saint Paul School, Seema informs security personnel about the planned assassination.

Khanna, the corrupt chief security officer, is informed and sends his men after Seema to kill her, but Baadshah, witnessing this, fights them off and saves her. They both discuss everything they know and come to realise their misunderstandings. Rani and Moti witness everything as well and they too understand the confusion. Seema is devastated to hear that her brother is dead, and that Baadshah's friends and the child are now in the custody of Thapar. He asks Baadshah to assassinate Bachchan himself or else he will kill Baadshah's friends and the child, which Seema secretly hears. The child is strapped to a bomb vest and held hostage in a van monitored by Moti and Baadshah's friends are held in a high-rise by Rani.

At the Holiday Inn Hotel, Baadshah meets the chief minister's husband, Tyagraj Bachchan, at the invitation of Sheetal (the chief minister's secretary), and finds out that he is also involved in the assassination plot after Tyagraj kills Sheetal. Seema and her uncle, enlisting the help of hotel staff, discreetly help Baadshah to rescue his friends and the child, while secretly giving a note of the plot to the Chief Minister. However, at the press meet, Bachchan learns of the assassination plot and that the mastermind behind it is her husband. Glancing at Bachchan with a sorrow look, Baadshah pulls out his gun and opens fire upon the security personnel. He manages to wipe them all out, including Khanna, while Thapar's attempt on Bachchan's life fails. Tyagraj tries to flee but is apprehended by CBI officers, Seema's uncle and the hotel staff. Thapar pulls out the bomb remote and threatens Baadshah's friends and CBI agents. They all dare Thapar to detonate the bomb. Thapar flees and is pursued by Baadshah while Dr. Surti works on the bomb. He manages to remove it and they throw it out of the building, where it lands right under Thapar's car. Thapar escapes and finds Rani and Moti outside and tells them to detonate the bomb once he is inside his car. As they press the button, the bomb detonates under his car, killing Thapar, while Rani and Moti flee the scene.

With his heroism noticed, Baadshah now has a booming business at his detective agency. Ram Lal receives a call from President Bill Clinton, offering $1,000,000 for assistance with the "Monica Case". Baadshah refuses it, saying he is on wife duty.

== Cast ==
- Shah Rukh Khan as Raj Babulal Rai a.k.a. Baadshah
- Twinkle Khanna as Seema Malhotra / Rosie
- Rakhee Gulzar as Gayatri Devi Bachchan, Chief Minister of Goa
- Amrish Puri as Suraj Singh Thapar, the main antagonist.
- Johnny Lever as Ram Lal, Baadshah's personal assistant.
- Sharat Saxena as Moti, Rani's boyfriend.
- Sachin Khedekar as Tyagraj Bachchan, Gayatri's husband.
- Pankaj Dheer as Mr. Khanna
- Deepshikha Nagpal as Rani, Moti's girlfriend.
- Saurabh Shukla as Chief Saxena
- Avtar Gill as K. Jhunjhunwala
- Razak Khan as Manik Chand, Saxena's partner.
- Viju Khote as Vijoo Yadav
- Amrit Patel as Tom Uncle
- Dinesh Hingoo as Dr. Rustom
- Dinyar Contractor as Casino Manager
- Kiran Zaveri as Sheetal Ladha, Gayatri's secretary
- Adi Irani as Adi Chopra, a CBI agent
- Neeraj Vora as Dr. Rusi Surti
- Sudhir as Rocky Oberoi, Baadshah's personal assistant
- Anant Mahadevan as Mahender Seth
- Rahul Singh as Chaiwala
- Sharad Sankla as Chauki Lal, Baadshah's personal assistant.
- Mahavir Shah as Police Inspector Arvind Katkar
- Shashi Sharma as Mrs. Nathan, CBI officer
- Prem Chopra as CBI Chief Ramesh (special appearance)
- Shashikala as Baadshah's mother (special appearance)
- Deepak Tijori as Deepak Malhotra, CBI officer (the real Baadshah and secret agent 420) and Seema's brother (special appearance)

== Soundtrack ==
Baadshah

Soundtrack album by Anu Malik
- Released: 17 June 1999
- Genre: Film soundtrack
- Label: Venus Records & Tapes

Anu Malik chronology
Haseena Maan Jaayegi (1999)	Baadshah (1999)	Gang (2000)
External audio
- Audio Jukebox on YouTube

The soundtrack has 6 songs composed by Anu Malik. The soundtrack was well received.

All lyrics are written by Sameer and Javed Akhtar.

No.	Title	Singer(s)	Length
1.	"Main To Hoon Pagal"	Abhijeet Bhattacharya, Shahrukh Khan	6:18
2.	"Woh Ladki Jo"	Abhijeet Bhattacharya	7:04
3.	"Mohabbat Ho Gayee Hai"	Abhijeet Bhattacharya, Alka Yagnik	6:00
4.	"Hum To Deewane Hue Yaar"	Abhijeet Bhattacharya, Alka Yagnik	6:56
5.	"Baadshah, O Baadshah"	Abhijeet Bhattacharya	6:37
6.	"O Baby"	Anu Malik	6:54
Total length:			39:49

== Reception ==
Writing for Rediff.com, Syed Firdaus Ashraf mentioned that Khan had "performed well, so have Twinkle and her navel, which was in full view right through the film".

== Box office ==
Baadshah grossed ₹25.08 crore (US$2.7 million) in India and $1.5 million (₹6.52 crore) in other countries, for a worldwide total of ₹31.60 crore (US$3.4 million), against its ₹11 crore (US$1.2 million) budget. It had a worldwide opening weekend of ₹7.81 crore (US$830,000), and grossed ₹13.33 crore (US$1.4 million) in its first week. It is the 8th-highest-grossing film of 1999 in India.

=== India ===
It opened on Friday, 27 August 1999, across 280 screens, and earned ₹1.10 crore (US$120,000) nett on its opening day. It grossed ₹3.21 crore (US$340,000) nett in its opening weekend, and had a first week of ₹5.88 crore (US$630,000) nett. The film earned a total of ₹14.87 crore (US$1.6 million) nett, and was declared "Average" by Box Office India. It is the 10th-highest-grossing film of 1999 in India.

=== Overseas ===
It had an opening weekend of $550,000 (₹2.39 crore) and went on to gross $780,000 (₹3.39 crore) in its first week. The film earned a total of $1.5 million (₹6.52 crore) at the end of its theatrical run. Overseas, It is the 6th-highest-grossing film of 1999.

'Baadshah' worldwide collections breakdown
Territory	Territory wise Collections break-up
India	Nett Gross: ₹14.87 crore (US$1.6 million)
India	Distributor share: ₹8.18 crore (US$870,000)
India	Total Gross: ₹25.08 crore (US$2.7 million)
International (Outside India)	$1.5 million (₹6.52 crore)
Worldwide	₹31.60 crore (US$3.4 million)

== Awards ==
Award	Category	Nominees	Results
Filmfare Awards	Best Comedian	Shah Rukh Khan	Nominated
Filmfare Awards	Best Villain	Amrish Puri	Nominated
