= Saath Sobat =

- Film Poster
- Directed by: Ramesh More
- Written by: Ramesh More
- Screenplay by: Ramesh More
- Produced by: Dhanaji Maru
- Starring: Sangram Samel; Mrunal Kulkarni; Mohan Joshi; Anil Gawas
- Production company: Maru Enterprises
- Distributed by: Zee talkies
- Release date: 13 January 2023
- Country: India
- Language: Marathi

Saath Sobat (transl. Along with) is a 2023 Indian Marathi-language romantic drama film written and directed by Ramesh More and produced by Dhanaji Maru under the banner of Maru Enterprises. The film was theatrically released on 13 January 2023.

== Cast ==
- Sangram Samel
- Mrunal Kulkarni
- Mohan Joshi
- Anil Gawas

== Release ==
The film was theatrically released on 13 January 2023 in Maharashtra.
