= Amit Pachori =

Indian television actor

- Born: 20 August 1985 (age 41); Indore, Madhya Pradesh, India
- Citizenship: India
- Education: Cristian University, Lucknow
- Occupation: Actor
- Years active: 1997–present
- Known for: Om Namah Shivay; Supercops vs Supervillains
- Notable work: Ramayan; Ek Veer Stree Ki Kahani... Jhansi Ki Rani; Crime Alert
- Spouse: Simran Pachori (m. 2007)
- Children: 1

Amit Pachori is an Indian television and film actor. He is best known for playing Tatya Tope in Ek Veer Stree Ki Kahani... Jhansi Ki Rani, Vishnu in Om Namah Shivay and Supercop Ranveer in SuperCops Vs Super Villains.

== Career ==
Amit made his television debut as Shiva in mythology show Krishna in 1993. In 2012, he became popular playing the character of Tatya Tope in the TV serial Ek Veer Stree Ki Kahaani – Jhansi Ki Rani and Ranveer in SuperCops Vs Super Villains.

In 2006, he played Amit in C.I.D of Sony TV. He also Played Vibhore and SuryaKiran in crime television series Adaalat.

He has acted in many mythology television series such as Vishnu Puran, Ramayan, Dwarkadheesh Bhagwan Shree Krishn, Jai Hanuman – Sankat Mochan Naam Tiharo, Shrimad Bhagwat Mahapuran, and many more.

He has acted in Many Indian Historical Television series such as Dharti Ka Veer Yodha Prithviraj Chauhan, Ek Veer Stree Ki Kahaani – Jhansi Ki Rani, Swaraj etc.

In 2019 he hosted the crime dramatisation series Crime Alert.

In 2023, he played the character of Mohit in the television series Anupamaa and Tarun Shukla in the television series Dhruv Tara.

Amit made his film debut with the film Aag Aandhi Aur Toofan in 1994. He has acted in 100+ b grade Hindi Films such as Angoor, Murde Ki Maut, Heerabai, etc.

== Filmography ==
=== Television ===
Year	Title	Role	Notes	Ref
1993–1997	Krishna	Shiva		
1997	Om Namah Shivay	Vishnu		
1997	Jai Hanuman	Angada		
2000–2003	Shree Ganesh	Indra		
2001–2002	Vishnu Puran	Lakshmana		
2002	Ramayan	Shatrughna		
2004	Raat Hone Ko Hai		Story 31: Jaanwar	
2006	Viraasat	Inspector Vishal Deshmukh		
2007	Raavan	Hanuman		
2007	Dharti Ka Veer Yodha Prithviraj Chauhan	Sikandar		
2008	Ramayan	Shiva		
2008	Arslaan			
2009	Ek Veer Stree Ki Kahaani – Jhansi Ki Rani	Tatya Tope		
2009	Jo Ishq Ki Marzi Woh Rab Ki Marzi	Balveer		
2009	Pehchaan			
2010	Mahima Shani Dev Ki	Mahadev		
2011	Piya Ka Ghar Pyaara Lage	Angad		
2011	Dwarkadheesh Bhagwan Shree Krishna	Duryodhana		
2006, 2011	CID	Amit		
2011–2012	Veer Shivaji	Netaji Palkar		
2012	Savdhaan India : Crime Alert			
2012	Fear Files: Darr Ki Sacchi Tasvirein	Episodic Role		
2012	Ramleela – Ajay Devgn Ke Saath	Vibhishana		
2012	Ramayan	Parashurama		
2012	Ghar ki beti kanya	Vikas		
2012, 2013	Adaalat	Vibhore, SuryaKiran		
2012, 2013	Adaalat	Bhaskar Chaubey		
2013–2016, 2017	SuperCops Vs Super Villains	Supercop Ranveer		
2013	Sankat Mochan Hanumaan	Indrajit		
2017	Jaat Ki Jugni	Bhim Singh Ahlawat		
2017	Crime Alert	Host		
2018	Shrimad Bhagwat Mahapuran	Vishnu		
2022	Jai Hanuman – Sankatmochan Naam Tiharo	Vibhishana		
2022	Swaraj	Puli Thevar		
2023	Dhruv Tara – Samay Sadi Se Pare	Tarun Shukla		
2023	Anupamaa	Mohit		
2023–2024	Baatein Kuch Ankahee Si	Indraneel Sarkar		
2023–2024	Karmadhikari Shanidev	Bhagwan Shiv		
2024	Wagle Ki Duniya – Nayi Peedhi Naye Kissey	Colonel Ashish Singh	Guest role ep 982	
2024	Lakshmi Narayan – Sukh Samarthya Santulan	Hayagrivasura		
2024–2025	Tenali Rama	Mahamantri Timmarusu		
2024	Shiv Shakti – Tap Tyaag Tandav	Mangala		
2025–2026	Kakbhushundi Ramayan – Anasuni Kathayein	Vali / Sugriva		

=== Web series ===
Year	Title	Role	Notes	Ref
2022	Ishqiyapa	Arjun	Mini series	
2023	Paurashpur 2	Veer Bhanu		

=== Films ===
Year	Title	Role	Notes	Ref
1994	Aag Aandhi Aur Toofan			
1997	Kamsin: The Untouched			
1999	Poonam Ki Raat			
1999	Prem Shashtra			
2000	Daku Ganga Jamuna			
2000	Kharidaar	Raj Purohit		
2000	Bhai Takur	Krishna		
2000	Bhayanak Maut	Amit		
2001	Junglee Tarzan			
2001	Khatron Ke Khiladi	Sanjay Pratap Singh		
2001	Rupa Rani Ramkali			
2001	Shaheed-E-Kargil			
2002	Duplicate Sholay	Jay / Shahenshah		
2002	Jeene Nahin Doongi			
2002	Zindagi aur Maut	Amit		
2003	Dangerous Night			
2005	Angoor	Vicky		
2007	Gabbar Singh	Vijay		
