= Aag Aandhi Aur Toofan =

1994 film by Kanti Shah

- Directed by: Kanti Shah
- Produced by: Mahendra Dhariwal
- Starring: Mukesh Khanna; Kiran Kumar; Upasana Singh
- Music by: N.K.Nandan
- Production company: Nakoda Films
- Release date: November 25, 1994
- Running time: 155 min
- Country: India
- Language: Hindi

Aag Aandhi Aur Toofan is a 1994 Hindi language action movie directed by Kanti Shah and starring Mukesh Khanna, Kiran Kumar and Upasana Singh.

== Plot ==
The story revolves around attempts by several people to bring down Chandi, a vicious dacoit. Inspector Arjun Singh wants to destroy him to preserve the law. Durga, Seema, Geeta and Sikandar Khan, who all have reasons to seek revenge on Chandi, agree to help. During an encounter with Chandi, Arjun Singh is injured, but he saves everybody's life. Another element of the plot involves Durga falling in love and marrying Chhalia. But when Durga learns that Chhalia is a traitor against their country, Durga kills him.

== Cast ==
- Mukesh Khanna – Sikandar Khan
- Kiran Kumar – Inspector Arjun Singh
- Joginder – Daku Chandi
- Upasana Singh – Durga
- Mukesh Goyal as Abhishek
- Sadhana Singh as Sudha
- Meena Singh – Geeta
- Ashok Raj – Suraj
- Shabnam – Seema
- Sameer Rajda – Chhalia
- Amit Pachori as Sanjay
