= Shegavicha Rana Gajanan =

Shegavicha Rana Gajanan - Marathi Movie
- Theatrical release poster
- Directed by: Babanrao Gholap
- Produced by: Babanrao Gholap
- Starring: Sayaji Shinde; Babanrao Gholap; Ravindra Berde; Deepak Shirke
- Music by: Sanjay Geete
- Release date: 11 December 2004
- Country: India
- Language: Marathi

Shegavicha Rana Gajanan is a Marathi movie released on 11 December 2004. Produced and directed by Babanrao Gholap.

== Cast ==
- Sayaji Shinde as Gajanan Maharaj
- Babanrao Gholap
- Ravindra Berde
- Deepak Shirke

== Soundtrack ==
The music is provided by Sanjay Geete.
