= Sankat Mochan Hanumaan =

Indian television mythological series

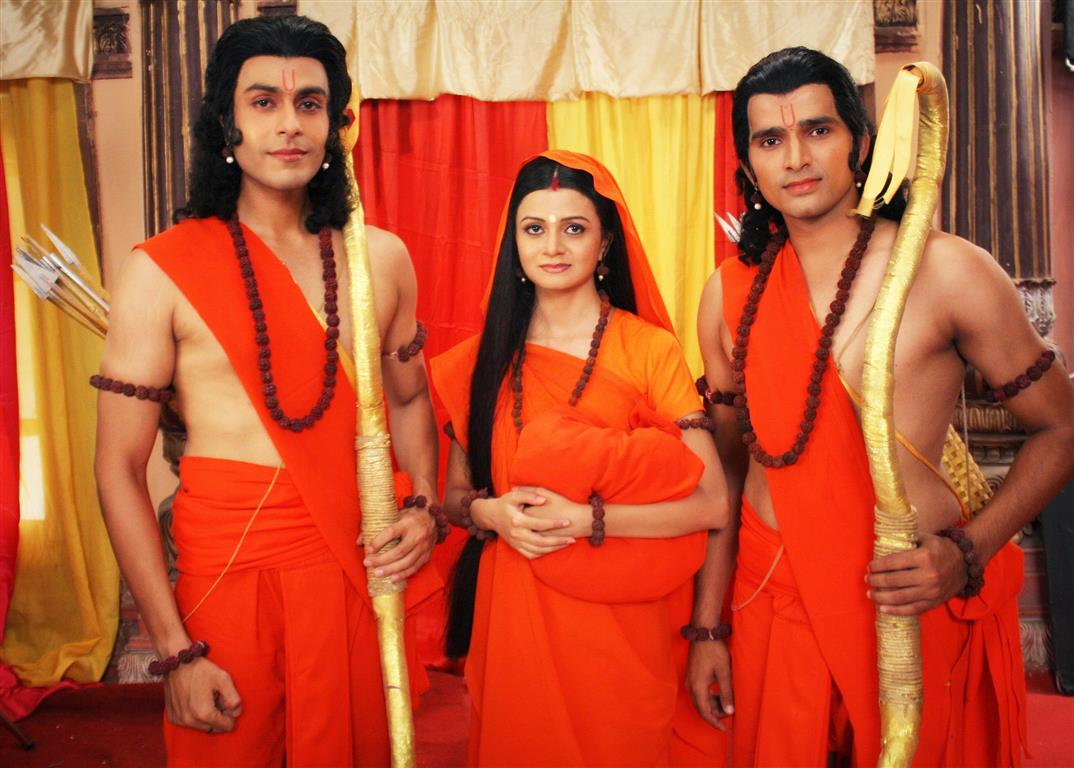
- Sankat Mochan Hanumaan
- Genre: Mythology
- Directed by: Ajay Kumar
- Creative director: Parwez Khan
- Starring: Chandan Madan; Samiksha Bhatt; Raj Premi
- Theme music composer: Ravindra Jain
- Country of origin: India
- Original language: Hindi
- No. of seasons: 01
- No. of episodes: 224

Production
- Producer: Rajesh Singh Chauhan
- Editors: Pappu Trivedi; Mukesh Kumar
- Running time: 22 minutes
- Production company: Good Work Production

Original release
- Network: DD National
- Release: 10 March 2012 – 10 November 2013

Sankat Mochan Hanuman (transl. Hanuman, the remover of troubles) was an Indian television mythological series based on the legends of Hanumaan, Ram, Sita and Lakshman. It released on 10 March 2012 and ran until 10 November 2013 in DD National.

The show originally aired in Hindi and is after being dubbed in Marathi, Tamil, Telgu, Malayalam, Kannada, Maithili.

== Cast ==
=== Main ===
- Chandan Madan as Rama
- Samiksha Bhatt as Sita
- Kunal Singh Rajpoot as Lakshmana

=== Recurring ===
- Heta Shah as Anjani (Hanuman's Mother)
- Raj Premi as Ravan (King of Lanka)
- Amit Pachori as Indrajit (Meghnad) (Son of Ravan and Prince of Lanka)
- Bhupinder Bhoopi as Kumbhakarna (Ravan's younger brother and Vibhishana's elder brother)
- Ram Awana as Vibhishana (Ravan's younger brother)
- Sonia Singh Rajput as Surpankha
- Amit Singh as Ravan's Mantri
- Ravish Rathi as Pawan Dev
- Yukti Kapoor as Sulochana

== Reception ==
The show had the highest TRP on the channel.
