= Altaf Raja =

Indian singer

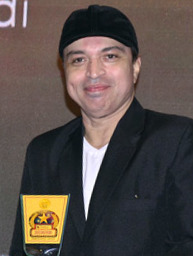
- Raja in 2019
- Born: 15 October 1967 (age 58); Nagpur, Maharashtra, India
- Occupation: Playback Singer
- Years active: 1991–present
- Parents: Ibrahim Iqbal (father); Rani Roop lata (mother)

Altaf Raja (born 15 October 1967) is an Indian Qawwali singer. In 1997 Altaf gained recognition with his debut album Tum To Thehre Pardesi. His most recent song is Ae Sanam. He uses Urdu shayari in his songs.

== Early life ==
Born in Nagpur to professional Qawwals Mr Ibrahim Iqbal and Mrs Rani Rooplata ji, Altaf Raja began musical training at the age of 15.

== Career ==
Raja's breakthrough came in 1997 with the album Tum To Thehre Pardesi, which sold 20 million copies and earned a spot in the Guinness World Records.

Raja has also acted in Bollywood movies such as Shapath (1997), Yamraaj (1998), Mother (1999), and Ghanchakkar (2013).

== Albums ==
Year	Album	Artist	Music Director	Label
1997	Tum To Thehre Pardesi	Altaf Raja	Mohd. Shafi Niyazi	Venus
1999	Mujhe Apna Bana Lo	Altaf Raja	Mohd. Shafi Niyazi	Venus
1999	Aaj Ki Raat Na Ja Pardesi	Altaf Raja	Mohd. Shafi Niyazi	Venus
2000	Do Dil Haare	Altaf Raja	Altaf Raja, Vaishnav Deva	Venus
2000	Dil Ke Tukde Hazaar Huye	Altaf Raja	Altaf Raja, Vaishnav Deva	Venus
2001	Sai Ka Deewana	Altaf Raja, Farid Sabari Jaipuri, Ram Shankar		Venus
2001	Dil Ka Haal Sune Dilwala	Altaf Raja	Altaf Raja, Vaishnav Deva	Venus
2001	Altaf and Adnan Ek Saath	Altaf Raja, Adnan Sami	Altaf Raja, Adnan Sami, Vaishnav Deva	Venus
2001	Taaza Hawa Lete Hain	Altaf Raja	Altaf Raja, Vaishnav Deva	Venus
2002	Khilona Jaan Kar	Altaf Raja		Venus
2003	Ek Dard Sabhi Ko Hota Hai	Altaf Raja	Altaf Raja, Vaishnav Deva	Venus
2003	Market	Altaf Raja		Venus
2004	Dukaan	Altaf Raja		Venus
2006	Tere Ishq Ne Maalamaal Kiya	Altaf Raja		
2006	Harrjaiie	Altaf Raja		
2007	Koi Patthar Se Na Mare	Altaf Raja		
2009	Chalo Maikhane Chalo	Altaf Raja		Venus
2012	Ashqon Ki Baraat	Altaf Raja	Altaf Raja	Venus
2015	BumGola	Altaf Raja, Raj Mittal	Akashraj	Zee Music Company
2020	Ae Sanam	Altaf Raja, Payal Dev	Payal Dev	Apni Dhun
2021	Saath Kya Nibhaoge	Altaf Raja, Tony Kakkar	Tony Kakkar	Desi Music Factory

== Movies as playback singer ==
1. Vickida No Varghodo (2022) - Gujarati movie
2. Tamasha (2015)
3. Dil Lagana - Hunterrr (2015)
4. Jholu Ram - Ghanchakkar (2013)
5. Madholal: Keep Walking (2010)
6. Toonpur Ka Superhero (2010)
7. Market (2003)
8. Tumse Kitna - Company (2002)
9. Aaapka Naam kya - Benaam (1999)
10. Mother (1999)
11. Pardesi Babu (1998)
12. Keemat: They Are Back (1998)
13. Hayo Rabba Pyar Ho Gaya - Tirchhi Topiwale (1998)
14. Harjai (2007)
15. Hum Hain Aise Chore - Yamraaj (1998)
16. Peelo Ishq Di Wisky - Mard (1998)
17. Karlo Pyar Karlo - Chandaal (1998)
18. Ishq Aur Pyar Ka Maza Lijiye - Shapath (1997)

== Movies as composer ==
1. Dukaan: Pila House (2004)
2. Market (2003)
