= Junglee Tarzan =

2001 film by Kishan Shah

Junglee Tarzan is a 2001 Indian film by Kishan Shah.

== Plot ==
A group of hunters come into a dense forest to recover a hidden treasure. Dacoit Aiappan captures this forest and is also searching for those valuable treasures. A jungle lady Bela confronts and restrains them from doing further wrong.

== Cast ==
- Hemant Birje as Majid Khan
- Joginder as Aiappan
- Sapna (actress) as Bela
- Shiva Rindani as Rana
- Anil Nagrath as Tribal leader Pursottham
- Amit Pachori as Sanjay Pratap
- Birbal as Karan
- Gur Bachchan Singh as Capt Zorro
- Ali Khan as Vikram
- Satnam Kaur as Shabnam
- Nisha Kamat as Anuja
- Romesh Goel as Shyamlal
- Pinky Chinoy as Suchitra
