= Gunda (1998 film) =

1998 Indian film by Kanti Shah

- Poster
- Directed by: Kanti Shah
- Written by: Bashir Babbar
- Produced by: Anil Singh
- Starring: Mithun Chakraborty; Mukesh Rishi; Ishrat Ali; Shakti Kapoor
- Cinematography: Salim Suma
- Music by: Anand Raj Anand
- Production company: Maruti Films
- Distributed by: Goldmines Telefilms
- Release date: 4 September 1998
- Running time: 135 minutes
- Country: India
- Language: Hindi

Gunda (transl. Goon) is a 1998 Indian Hindi-language action film written by Bashir Babbar and directed by Kanti Shah. Starring Mithun Chakraborty, Mukesh Rishi and Shakti Kapoor, the film was produced by Anil Singh and the music was composed by Anand Raj Anand. The narrative revolves around a coolie who vows to exact revenge upon a crime lord and his cronies after they kill his loved ones. The film was released on 4 September 1998. Over time, the film has gained a cult following, selling over 2,000 VCD copies at a single outlet. It also received a limited re-release in 2018. The same year, actor Deepak Shirke who played politician Bachubhai, revealed that the film was pitched to him without a script.

== Plot ==
The story begins with two corrupt politicians hiring rival crime lords Lambu Aatta and Bulla to eliminate each other. Lambu Aatta kicks off the bloodshed by killing one of Bulla's lackeys, who after being stabbed is seen running around in mines only to find Bulla finally who pulls out the sword from his lackey killing him . Here we are introduced to Bulla's close circle , Minister Pote , His devious hermaphrodite brother Chuttya , Ibu Hatela . Bulla retaliates by murdering Lambu Aatta's brother, Kundan and leaving him to die on an airport runway . Not to be outdone, Lambu Aatta escalates the depravity by raping and killing Bulla's sister. Bulla, predictably, kills Lambu Aatta despite the latters offer to be his servant and claims the underworld crown.

Enter Shankar, a coolie, who lives with his policeman father, sister Geeta, and a pet monkey named Tinku. Geeta' friend Ganga loves Shankar but Shankar has bigger things to worry about. He enters a fighting contest run by Bulla to help a labourer finance his daughter's wedding and defeats Bulla's prized champion Kaala Pahaad by merely twisting his fingers for a few seconds.

Shankar's policeman father tries to stop the extortion racket run by Bulla's goons and gets beaten up by them but Shankar arrives and fights them off. Bulla's revenge takes a darker turn when his henchman Naate kidnaps Geeta, who's briefly saved by Gulshan, only for it to be revealed as a trap. Gulshan marries her, then hands her over to Bulla's brother Chuttiya, who rapes and kills her and then dumps her body in a jungle. Tinku, the monkey, leads Shankar to Geeta's dead body, leading Shankar to swear to kill Bulla and all his henchmen within 10 days.

Shankar's father confronts a corrupt inspector, only to be choked to death. Shankar now starts picking off Bulla's crew, beheading one, killing another, and getting framed for the murder of politician Bachchubhai Bhigona, who's conveniently sniped by someone else. Arrested , Jailed , Tried and convicted on same day he escapes the same night, Shankar continues his rampage, taking down a human trafficker and discovering that the abandoned baby girl he adopted is Bulla's illegitimate child. Bulla kills Ganga in retaliation.

In the climax, Bulla arrives with several auto-rickshaws but Shankar fights them off with a rocket launcher. Bulla tries to use his own baby as a shield but Tinku the monkey saves her. Bulla tries to escape in a helicopter but Shankar kills him by impaling him on its landing gear.

== Cast ==
- Mithun Chakraborty as Shankar
- Mukesh Rishi as Bulla
- Ishrat Ali as Lambu Atta
- Shakti Kapoor as Chuttiya
- Razak Khan as Lucky Chikna
- Rami Reddy as Kala Shetty
- Harish Patel as Ibu Hatela
- Mohan Joshi as Pote
- Deepak Shirke as Bachubhai Bhigona
- Rana Jung Bahadur as Inspector Kale
- Arun Mathur as Havaldar Ram Singh, Shankar's father
- Varna Raj as Ganga
- Gulshan Rana as Gulshan
- Vinod Tripathi as Kundan
- Sapna as Geeta

== Soundtrack ==
#	Title	Singer(s)
1	"Tum Bin Jeena Raas Na Aaye"	Sadhana Sargam, Udit Narayan
2	"Nasha Nasha Karta Haiin"	Anand Raj Anand, Poonam Bhatia
3	"Aaj Parayi Hokar Behna Jaye"	Mohammed Aziz
4	"Kholi Mere Dil Ki Khali Hai Tu"	Poonam Bhatia, Abhijeet Bhattacharya
5	"Teri Aankhon Ka Chal Gaya Jadu"	Kavita Krishnamurthy, Kumar Sanu

== Reception ==
=== Reviews ===
Ravi Balakrishnan of The Economic Times states "The Mithun Chakarborthy-starrer has gained a surprising amount of cult popularity over the last year and a half or so, with several adulatory reviews and even fan-sites cropping up. But when we first saw Gunda, back in 2005, a full seven years after its unheralded release in 1998, it was the first any of us had heard of the film or its prolific director, Kanti Shah." Mayank Shekhar of the Mumbai Mirror says that "Gladwell hasn't seen Gunda (probably, neither have you). He must. He'd be glad. In my living memory, I have yet to notice a more startling revelation of the mysterious 'tipping point' anywhere of my social circle. Over the past few months, about four unrelated sources from three parts of the world have asked me if I'd seen Kanti Shah's Gunda."

=== Controversy ===
On its release in 1998, the film had to be withdrawn from theaters due to complaints received by the Central Board of Film Certification from college girls who were appalled by the excessive violence, sex and obscenity in the film. The film had earlier been rejected by the Central Board of Film Certification due to use of filthy language and obscenity, it was later passed with an A certificate after the film makers made changes to the film. It was alleged that the version running in theaters prior to the withdrawal was the unedited print. The cases filed from Mumbai, Hyderabad and Bangalore have since been withdrawn and the movie has also been cleared.
