= Shapath =

1997 film by Mithun Chakraborty

- Poster
- Directed by: Rajiv Babbar
- Written by: Anwar Khan (dialogues)
- Story by: Sanjay Kumar
- Produced by: Rajiv Babbar
- Starring: Mithun Chakraborty; Jackie Shroff; Ramya Krishna; Vineetha
- Cinematography: V. Durgaprasad
- Edited by: Dilip-Zafar
- Music by: Anand–Milind
- Production company: Aabha Films
- Release date: 12 December 1997
- Running time: 140 minutes
- Country: India
- Language: Hindi

Shapath (transl. Oath) is a 1997 Indian Hindi-language action film directed and produced by Rajiv Babbar, it stars Mithun Chakraborty, Jackie Shroff, Ramya Krishna, and Vineetha in lead roles.

== Plot ==
Policeman Arjun, who saved the life of the Home Minister, is appointed chief of security. But because of his mistake, the bandits kill the minister. To take revenge on the killers, Arjun infiltrates the mafia, and the tough policeman Kishan is hired to help him.

== Cast ==
- Mithun Chakraborty as Commando Arjun / Surya
- Jackie Shroff as Inspector Kishan
- Ramya Krishna as Inspector Kavita
- Vineetha as Shalu
- Rami Reddy as Minister Dindayal Kallu
- Raza Murad as Minister Rana Jung Bahadur
- Kader Khan as Chaurasia
- Shakti Kapoor as Constable Shakti Singh
- Ranjeet as Dr. Subramaniam Swami
- Gulshan Grover as Rajeshwar
- Salim Ghouse as Lankeshwar
- Harish Kumar as Rahul
- Achyut Potdar as Satyajeet
- Deepak Shirke as Assistant Commissioner of Police
- Eva Grover as Neena
- Tina Ghai as Chameli
- Guddi Maruti as Sharmili Singh
- Rohit Dubey as Constable Sheroo
- Altaf Raja as himself in song "Ishq Aur Pyar Ka Mazaa Lijiye" (Special a pearance)

== Soundtrack ==
The songs were composed by Anand–Milind and lyrics were penned by Sameer Anjaan

1. "Ishq Aur Pyar Ka Mazaa Lijiye" - Altaf Raja, Sonu Nigam, Vinod Rathod
2. "Hai Bada Anari Rabba" - Udit Narayan, Alka Yagnik
3. "Chum Le Mere Baalon Ko" - Vinod Rathod, Poornima
4. "Chuski Chuski" - Udit Narayan
5. "Munde Bigad Gaye" - Udit Narayan, Vinod Rathod, Alka Yagnik
6. "Ishq Aur Pyar Ka Mazaa Lijiye" - Altaf Raja
