= Rupa Rani Ramkali =

2001 film by K.I. Shaikh

Rupa Rani Ramkali is a Hindi action movie of Bollywood directed by K.I. Shaikh and produced by Kamal Nayar. This film was released on 23 March 2001 under the banner of Millennium 2000 Films.

== Plot ==
This is a revenge story of Ramkali, a dancer turned bandit.

== Cast ==
- Kiran Kumar as Badshah Khan
- Sadashiv Amrapurkar as Zamindar Rasikalal Rasia
- Mohan Joshi as Daku Gujjar Singh
- Gajendra Chauhan as Yashwant Vij
- Jack Gaud as Daroga Bhimsen
- Sapna as Rupa
- Amit Pachori as Sanjay Pratap Singh
- Anil Nagrath as Lawyer Saxena
- Kirti Shetty as Ramkali
- Vinod Tripathi as Kundan
- Brij Gopal as Vishal Chodhury
