= Crime Alert =

Indian crime television series

- Also known as: Crime Alert - Jurm Ke Khilaaf Awaaz; Crime Alert - Hamari Maqsad Aapki Hifaazat; Crime Alert - Darna Nahin Mitana Hai; Crime Alert - Jurm Ki Kahani Khud Ki Zubani
- Genre: Reality; Documentary; Crime; Romance
- Created by: Himanshu Padak; Shankarlal; W. Pankaj
- Written by: Naila Ali Chockle
- Directed by: Anil Rawat
- Creative director: Sanat Roy
- Presented by: Girish Jain; Amit Pachori; Sudha Chandran; Suhaib Ilyasi (for Dangal 2); Sushant Singh
- Starring: See Below
- Country of origin: India
- Original language: Hindi
- No. of seasons: 6
- No. of episodes: 1000+

Production
- Producers: Anirban Bhattacharyya; Sudha Chandran; Suhaib Ilyasi
- Editors: Ravi Bhushan; Vinod Kohli
- Running time: 50 minutes
- Production companies: Roots In East Productions; V Edit Studios LLP; Rowdy Rascal Productions; Shashi Sumeet Productions; Optimystix Entertainment; Waterdrop Entertainment; Sumeet Arts; Filmi Nights

Original release
- Network: Dangal (2017—2023); Dangal 2 (2023—present)
- Release: 2 April 2017 – present

Related
- India Alert

Crime Alert - Darna Nahin Mitana Hai (transl. Crime Alert – Don't Be Afraid, Eliminate[crime]) is an Indian crime television show that aired on Dangal and Dangal 2 as Crime Alert - Hamari Maqsad Aapki Hifaazat (transl. Crime Alert - Our Aim Is Your Safety). It was hosted by Girish Jain, Amit Pachori, Sudha Chandran (for Dangal TV), Suhaib Ilyasi and Sushant Singh (for Dangal 2). This show is based on real-life crimes in India, with dramatized reconstructions, altered names, and changed locations. A version titled Crime Alert - Jurm Ki Kahani Khud Ki Zubani aired on Dangal 2 from December. The series was produced by Filmi Nights Production House.

In 2017, the show was relaunched on Dangal TV.

In May 2025, Crime Alert - Time Aaj Ka Crime Aaj Ka has started airing on Dangal 2 with actor Sushant Singh as the host.

== Plot ==
The hosts present dramatized reenactments of true crime stories involving individuals who committed serious crimes driven by motives such as love, revenge, and greed.

== Cast ==
- Girish Jain
- Amit Pachori
- Avinesh Rekhi
- Sudha Chandran
- Suhaib Ilyasi
- Mohit Abrol
- Sushant Singh
- Mahi Sharma
- Vikram Wadhwa

== See also ==
- List of programmes broadcast by Dangal TV
