= Saugandh =

Saugandh (lit. 'oath') may refer to:

- Saugandh (1942 film), an Indian Hindi-language film of 1942
- Saugandh (1982 film), an Indian Hindi-language film by Ravikant Nagaich
- Saugandh (1991 film), an Indian Hindi-language film by Raj Sippy
- Saugandh (2000 film), an Indian Hindi-language film, starring Shakti Kapoor
