= Khoonkar Darinde =

Khoonkar Darinde is a Hindi low budget horror film of Bollywood directed by Teerat Singh and produced by Ajay Kumar. This film was released on 22 October 1999 in the banner of Atlanta productions.

== Plot ==
This is a revenge story of a man who was killed and returns as a devil.

== Cast ==
- Shakti Kapoor as Kamlesh
- Deepak Shirke as David
- Sapna as Sangeeta
- Joginder as Hakim Singh
- Shiva Rindani as Rana
- Vinod Tripathi as Anand Pratap
- Meghna as Sarita
