= Deepak Shirke =

Indian film actor

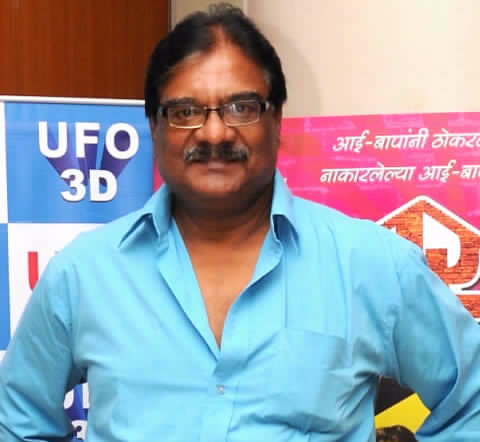
- Shirke in 2013
- Born: 29 April 1957 (age 69); Bombay, Bombay State, India
- Occupation: Actor
- Years active: 1987–present

Deepak Shirke (born 29 April 1957) is an Indian actor known for his work in Hindi and Marathi films. He has been involved in more than 100 Hindi films, usually playing the role of a villain. Shirke has also worked in the Hindi television industry, appearing in the crime series C.I.D. as ACP Digvijay, which aired on Sony TV.

== Career ==
His career extends from the late 1980s to 2014, during which his best-known films are Daag: The Fire, Anth, Tirangaa, Ishq, Judwaa, Bhai and Sarkar. He played the character of Constable Gaikwad in the web series Pandu, made by Bharatiya Digital Party.

== Filmography ==
=== Hindi films ===
Year	Title	Role
1990	Agneepath	Anna Shetty
1991	Hum	Pratap
1992	Vansh	
1993	Tirangaa	Pralaynath Gendaswamy
1993	Khuda Gawah	Kaalia Danger
1993	Meri Aan	Kaalia Patil
1994	Jai Kishen	Kaalia Shirke
1994	Anth	Inspector Shirke
1994	Jazbaat	
1995	Mere Naina Sawan Bhado	
1995	Andolan	Police Inspector Pathare
1995	Teen Moti	
1995	Veer	Chikoo Tandiya
1996	Param Kartavya	
1996	Jeet	Govardhan
1996	Rangbaaz	Bhima
1996	Rakshak	ACP Shirke
1996	Khilona	Daabla
1996	Ram aur Shyaam	Bakhtawar Yadav
1997	Judwaa	Jayantilal Ratan
1997	Daava	Anna
1997	Loha	Tandiya
1997	Koi Kisise Kam Nahin	
1997	Ishq	Damliya
1997	Shapath	ACP
1997	Bhai	Inspector Khar
1998	Hatya Kaand	
1998	Gunda	Politician Bhachubhai Bhigona
1998	Military Raaj	Swami
1999	Zimbo	
1999	Shera	VCR
1999	Sar Kati Laash	
1999	Lohpurush	Shankar Tandiya
1999	Krantipath	
1999	Dada	Vikas Anna
1999	Bhoot Ka Darr	
1999	Aantak Raaj	
1999	Daag: The Fire	Singhal's partner
1999	Khooni Ilaaka:The Prohibited Area	
1999	Kaala Samrajya	Albert
2000	Jwalamukhi	Mangal Lahar
2000	Khoonkar Darinde	
2000	Johra Bai	
2000	Daku Rani	
2000	Daku Maharani	
2000	Champakali	
2000	Bijlee	
2000	Bharat India Hindustan	
2000	Basanti	
2000	Agniputra	
2000	Meri Jung Ka Elaan	Thakur Jagawar Singh
2000	Jallad No.1	Inspector Dolkar
2000	Gang	
2001	Shiva Ka Insaaf	
2001	Bholi Bhali Ladki	
2001	Ramgadh Ki Raamkali	
2001	Pratighaat	
2001	Meri Adalat	Nagesh Lingha
2001	Maut Ki Haveli	
2001	Maut Ka Pinjraa	
2001	Khooni Tantrik	Baba Bhairavnath/Bhootnath
2001	Kanoon Ka Sikandar	
2001	Kaamukta	
2001	Gunahon Ki Devi	
2001	Dafan	
2001	Aaj Ka Gunda	
2001	Galiyon Ka Baadshah	
2001	Bhagawat Ek Jung	
2001	Jaydev	
2001	Indian	Veer Bahadur Singh
2002	Jo Dar Gaya Samjho Mar Gaya	
2002	Daulat Ki Hawas	
2002	Int Ka Jawab Patthar	Jwala Shetty Anna
2002	Border Kashmir	
2002	Encounter: The Killing	Tatya
2002	Gangobai	Sher Khan
2002	Sabse Badhkar Hum	Nagar
2002	Karz: The Burden of Truth	Madhav Singh
2003	Lady James Bond	
2003	Chaalbaaz	
2003	Om	Gotya
2003	Tada	
2003	Khel	
2004	Taarzan: The Wonder Car	Inspector Sanjay Sharma
2004	Ek Se Badhkar Ek	Deka
2004	Hanan	Banood
2005	Yeh Hai Zindgi	Ramu Anna
2005	D	Kunal Qureshi
2005	Sarkar	CM Madan Rathore
2006	Nana Mama	
2006	Vidyaarthi: The Power of Students	Red Dragon
2007	Ek Chalis Ki Last Local	Mangesh Chikey
2007	Bombay to Goa	Vishwavaram Kunmali Kutti Kutti Kutti / Vetti Kutti Anna
2008	Rama Rama Kya Hai Drama	Inspector Waghmare
2010	Kuchh Kariye	Anna Swamy
2012	Ferrari Ki Sawaari	Mama
2012	Mere Dost Picture Abhi Baki Hai	Sudama Bhosale
2013	John Day	Wagle
2015	P Se PM Tak	

=== Marathi films ===
Year	Title	Role
1987	Irsaal Karti	
1987	De Danadan	Zagdya Ramoshi
1988	Ek Gadi Baaki Anadi	Subhan Vighne
1989	Thartharat	Constable 100
1990	Dhadakebaaz	Bappa Bajrangi
1991	Shame To Shame	
1992	Nishpaap	Chalu Dada
1994	Vazir	
1994	Sonyachi Mumbai	Vamya
1999	Ratra Aarambh	
2004	Shegavicha Rana Gajanan	
2006	Chashme Bahaddar	Parshuram Dolya Dolan
2013	Zapatlela 2	Hanmya
2016	Ventilator	Aatma Dhadke
2017	Thank U Vitthala	Yamdev
2023	Aatmapamphlet	Aajoba(Grandfather of Aashish)
2025	Ata Thambaycha Naay!	Dattabhau(Father of Maruti Kadam)

=== Other language films ===
Year	Title	Role	Language
2005	Encounter Daya Nayak	Rafiq Topiwala	Kannada
2006	Happy	Madhumati's father	Telugu
