= Tum to Thehre Pardesi =

Urdu qawwali song and album

- album cover art

Studio album by Altaf Raja
- Released: September 1997
- Label: Venus

Tum to Thehre Pardesi is an Urdu qawwali and album sung by Altaf Raja in 1997. It was originally released as a b-side song of the album Panga Le Liya. Owing to its popularity, the album was re-released with the title synonymous to this song. It was the fifth most popular song in India, selling four million units in its maiden year. In a single day, seven million (70 lakh) copies were sold, attaining the Guinness World Records. The song is Raja's most popular song till date and he is quoted as saying that his fans often ask him to perform it during live concerts. In 2021, Sonu Sood and Farah Khan unsuccessfully created a reprise version of the song.
