= Benaam (1999 film) =

- Promotional Poster
- Directed by: T L V Prasad
- Written by: Salim Hyder (dialogues)
- Story by: S. Khan
- Produced by: Jayant Shah; Kirti Umraliya
- Starring: Mithun Chakraborty; Aditya Pancholi; Payal Malhotra; Ashish Vidyarthi; Kiran Kumar; Johny Lever
- Cinematography: K. V. Ramanna
- Edited by: Sundar S. Moolya
- Music by: Bappi Lahiri
- Production company: Shivshakti Productions
- Release date: 2 July 1999
- Running time: 135 minutes
- Country: India
- Language: Hindi

Benaam is a 1999 Indian Hindi-language action thriller film directed by T L V Prasad, starring Mithun Chakraborty, Aditya Pancholi, Payal Malhotra, Ashish Vidyarthi, Kiran Kumar and Johny Lever.

== Plot ==
The movie starts with an action scene of the murder. A masked man kills four people out for revenge. The police could not find out who is behind the mask and why he is killing people.

== Cast ==
- Mithun Chakraborty as Prakash/Kapila
- Aditya Pancholi as Shera
- Payal Malhotra as Sheetal
- Ashish Vidyarthi as Damak
- Kiran Kumar as Jagral
- Johny Lever as Munna Mobile
- Harish Patel as Bankhelal
- Kasam Ali as Shankar
- Pinky Chinoy as Mona
- Rajendra Gupta as Inspector Sidhharth
- Dev Malhotra as Shekhar
- Ramesh Goyal as Prakash
- Smriti Patkar as Chanchal
- Rani Sinha as Mohini
- Shyam Solanki as Dharmesh

== Music ==
All songs are penned by Anwar Sagar.

1. "Ankh Mila Le" - preeti Uttam, Jolly Mukherjee
2. "Aaapka Naam kya" - Altaf Raja
3. "Baajre Ke Khet Mein" - Jaspinder Narula
4. "Chanda Jaisi bindiya" - Abhijeet, Sapna Mukherjee
5. "Jab Woh Nikalta Hai" - Sapna Mukherjee, Amit Kumar
6. "O Hawa Sard Hai" - Poornima
