= Kaala Samrajya =

- Directed by: Deepak Bahry
- Screenplay by: Sisir Misraa; Meeraq Mirza
- Produced by: Bubby Kent
- Starring: Sunil Shetty; Monica Bedi; Amrish Puri
- Cinematography: Damodar Naidu
- Edited by: Nasir Hakim Ansari
- Music by: Anand–Milind
- Production company: Karishma Internationals
- Distributed by: B4U Entertainment
- Release date: 12 March 1999
- Running time: 119 minutes
- Country: India
- Language: Hindi

Kaala Samrajya is a 1999 Hindi language Indian film directed by Deepak Bahry. It stars Sunil Shetty, Monica Bedi, Amrish Puri.

== Plot ==
Mob boss Kaalkeshwar Singh (Amrish Puri) has an issue with a fellow mobster who wants to expand his own sphere of influence. During a confrontation, Albert (Deepak Shirke) attempts to shoot Kaalkeshwar, but due to the intervention of Arjun (Sunil Shetty), Albert is himself killed. Appreciative, Kaalkeshwar asks Arjun to spend some time on his estate out of town. He learns that Arjun's girlfriend, Maria (Mahru Sheikh) had then killed herself out of shame after having been molested by Albert. Her death has been now avenged. Kaalkeshwar introduces Arjun to his subdued and submissive wife, Monica (Monica Bedi). Unknown to Arjun, Kaalkeshwar is extremely jealous and had even killed a man for simply shaking her hand and complimenting her. His anger is unimaginable when he learned that his house guest Arjun and his wife Monica have begun an affair.

== Cast ==
- Sunil Shetty as Arjun
- Monica Bedi as Monica Singh
- Amrish Puri as Kaalkeshwar Singh
- Deepak Shirke as Albert
- Jaspal Bhatti as Johnny Guide
- Tej Sapru as Pratap
- Shiva Rindani as Rana
- Jack Gaud as Rampal
- Mushtaq Khan as Seth Mayawala
- Brijesh Tiwari as Nagpal
- Raja Duggal as Mathur
- Sheeba as Chandni
- Mahru Sheikh as Maria
- Arun Bakshi as Chandramohan
- Harish Patel as Ibu Hatela
- Gavin Packard as Douglas
- Ritu Shivpuri as Hot item number in “Aao Na”
- John Gabriel as Goon who misbehaves with Chandni

== Music ==
Kaala Samrajya

Studio album by Anand–Milind
- Released: 1999
- Label: Thakral

1. "Aaj Peene De Sharabi" - Bela Sulakhe, Bali Brahmbhatt
2. "Koi Hai Diwana Dil Me Kisi Ke Dil Me Hai Masti" - Arun Bakshi, Suneeta Rao
3. "Aao Na Aag Se Bhuja Lo" - Jaspinder Narula
4. "O My Love" - Parvez, Hema Sardesai
5. "Parda Hata De" - Kavita Krishnamurthy
6. "Tum Kaali Ho" - Abhijeet
