= Khopdi: The Skull =

1999 Indian film by Ramesh U Lakhiani

Khopdi: The Skull is a Hindi low budget horror film of Bollywood directed by Ramesh U Lakhiani and produced by Bhagat Singh. This film was released on 30 July 1999 under the banner of Bhagat Film Productions.

== Plot ==
A lady was raped and murdered by four men who dump her body in a shallow grave, but she is revived from the grave as a vengeful ghost.

== Cast ==
- Shakti Kapoor
- Sapna
- Jyoti Rana
- Anil Nagrath
- Vijay Solanki
- Rajesh Bakshi
- Priya Rao
- Usha Pendnekar
- Bashir Babbar
- Rashmi Verma
