= Lal Baadshah =

- Theatrical release
- Directed by: K.C. Bokadia
- Story by: K.C. Bokadia
- Produced by: K.C. Bokadia
- Starring: Amitabh Bachchan; Manisha Koirala; Shilpa Shetty; Radhika; Amrish Puri; Raghuvaran; Mukesh Rishi; Shakti Kapoor
- Cinematography: Peter Pereira
- Edited by: D. N. Malik
- Music by: Aadesh Shrivastav
- Production company: BMB Productions
- Distributed by: Eros International
- Release date: 5 March 1999
- Running time: 153 min
- Country: India
- Language: Hindi
- Budget: ₹11 crore
- Box office: ₹13.12 crore

Lal Baadshah (transl. Red King) is a 1999 Indian Hindi-language action film directed by K. C. Bokadia, starring Amitabh Bachchan in a dual role, Raghuvaran, Manisha Koirala, Shilpa Shetty and Amrish Puri. Nirupa Roy also appears in her last film playing Bachchan's foster mother. The film failed at the box office. However, owing to charisma of Bachchan, who brilliantly played a Bihari speaking hero, the movie was a hit in Eastern U.P. and Bihar.

== Plot ==
Lal Singh lives with his mother in a small basti in Mumbai and grew up with the poor and needy. He is called Lal Badshah by the people he lives among. Lal is a very helpful person and dead-set against crime. In the same city lives Vikram Singh, alias Vicky Baadshah, who is the Don of the city and is always clashing with Lal Baadshah. Vicky is the son of Dayal Singh, who lives far away from Mumbai in a castle. Vicky and his brother Ajit Singh, a corrupt police officer, want to rule the city.

Meanwhile, Lal meets Kiran, an L.I.C. agent who falls in love with him and is determined to become his wife. At the castle, Dayal Singh is still hunting for the treasures of the Maharaja, whom he murdered years ago, along with his brother Sultan Singh. When the Maharaja was murdered, his son, Dewan Ranbir Singh, hid the treasure, for which Dayal Singh tried to murder him.

== Cast ==
- Amitabh Bachchan as Lal Singh alias Lal Baadshah / Ranveer Singh (father)
- Manisha Koirala as Kiran
- Radhika as Wife of Ranveer Singh
- Amrish Puri as Thakur Dayal Singh
- Shilpa Shetty as Seema, Lawyer's daughter
- Shakti Kapoor as Balu
- Raghuvaran as Vikram Singh "Vicky"
- Mukesh Rishi as SP Ajit Singh
- Nirupa Roy as Lal's Foster Mother, Malti Singh
- Prem Chopra as Sultan Singh
- Mohan Joshi as a Lawyer Prakash Kulkarni
- Jack Gaud as Jabbar Singh
- Mac Mohan as Rafiq, Vikram's Henchman
- Ram Mohan
- Sudhir as Jaichand, Vikram's Henchman
- Mahesh Anand as Narayan Singh
- Viju Khote as Damodar Kiran's Boss
- Pramod Moutho as Maharaja
- Nagma as a Dancer in song, "Pattai Ley Humka Tu"

== Soundtrack ==
Lal Baadshah

Soundtrack album by Aadesh Shrivastava
- Released: January 1998
- Genre: Feature film soundtrack
- Label: Pen Audio

The music was composed by Aadesh Shrivastav. Lyrics were penned by Shyam Raj, Maya Govind and Gauhar Kanpuri.

=== Track listing ===
No.	Title	Lyrics	Singer(s)	Length
1.	"Dhano Ki Aankh Sharabi"	Shyam Raj	Sudesh Bhosale, Anuradha Paudwal
2.	"Dil Ki Dhadkan Bole"	Maya Govind	Udit Narayan, Alka Yagnik, Sapna Awasthi
3.	"Ek Dinak Dinah Din"	Maya Govind	Sudesh Bhosle, Alka Yagnik
4.	"Ishq Ki Aankh Mein"	Gauhar Kanpuri	Mohammed Aziz
5.	"Koi Hai Dil Dene Wala"	Shyam Raj	Sudesh Bhosale, Asha Bhosle
6.	"Mera Munna Jab Jawan Hoga"	Maya Govind	Udit Narayan, Anuradha Paudwal
7.	"Talah Kholde Chabbi Se"	Maya Govind	Sapna Awasthi
8.	"Pattai Ley Humka Tu"		Amitabh Bachchan, Aadesh Srivastava, Abhijeet Bhattacharya
