= Bhoot Ka Darr =

- Directed by: S. Gawli
- Produced by: Pankaj Johar
- Production company: Gulab Films
- Release date: 2 April 1999
- Running time: 85 min
- Country: India
- Language: Hindi

Bhoot Ka Darr is a Hindi horror film of Bollywood directed by S. Gawli and produced by Pankaj Johar. This film was released on 2 April 1999 in the banner of Kanti Shah's Gulab Films.

== Plot ==
The film opens in a graveyard, where a woman and her lover bury a dead body. With the help of her paramour, she has murdered her husband. Now, the ghost of the betrayed husband seeks revenge on his adulterous wife.

== Cast ==
- Rajesh Vivek
- Sapna
- Deepak Shirke
- Jyoti Rana
- Vinod Tripathi
- Kishore Bhanusali
- Anil Nagrath
- Arif Khan
