= Sapna Sappu =

Indian actress

- Born: Zarina Sheikh; 1 May 1980 (age 46); Nashik, Maharashtra, India
- Occupations: Actress, dancer, model
- Years active: 1998 – present
- Spouse: Rajesh Goyal (m. 2013–2018)
- Children: 1

Sapna Sappu (born Zarina Sheikh) is an Indian actress, producer and director who worked predominantly in Hindi Indian films. She entered the film industry in the movie Gunda, which was directed by Kanti Shah and she was given a role as Mithun Chakraborty's sister. In a career spanning over 20 years, she appeared in over 250 films in Hindi, Bhojpuri and Gujarati languages. In 2020 Sapna Sappu returned in the hit Adult TV series Aap Kee Sapna Bhabhi.

== Early life ==
Sappu was born on 1 May 1980 as Zarina Sheikh in a Muslim Family in Nasik.

== Personal life ==
On 20 July 2013, Sappu married Rajesh Goyal, a businessman from Gujarat, India. They have one son, Shaurya. After her marriage, Sapna relocated to Gujarat, India, for a few years. After her dispute with her husband, she moved back to Mumbai with her son to pursue a career in cinema again.

== Selected filmography ==
Year	Film	Role	Language
1998	Gunda	Geeta	Hindi
1999	Maut		Hindi
1999	Tan Aggan		Hindi
1999	Sikandar Sadak Ka		Hindi
1999	Shaitan Tantrik		Hindi
1999	Kavita Oh My Love	Kavita	Hindi
1999	Bhoot Ka Darr	Sapna	Hindi
1999	Dracula	Sheela	Hindi
1999	Munnibai	Heerabai	Hindi
1999	Khopdi: The Skull		Hindi
1999	Khooni Ilaaka: The Prohibited Area		Hindi
2000	Khoonkar Darinde		Hindi
2000	Kharidaar		Hindi
2000	Jai Bhavani		Hindi
2000	Heerabai	Heerabai	Hindi
2000	Ganga Dacait	Ganga	Hindi
2000	Daku Sultana		Hindi
2000	Dakurani Champa Bai	Champa Bai	Hindi
2000	Bhayanak Maut		Hindi
2000	Daku Ramkali	Daku Ramkali	Hindi
2000	Daku Ganga Jamuna	Anitha	Hindi
2000	Akhri Dacait		Hindi
2000	Raat Ki Baat	Raat Rani	Hindi
2000	Murdaa		Hindi
2000	Meri Jung Kaa Elaan	Durga	Hindi
2000	Bhai Thakur	Sundari L. Singh	Hindi
2001	Zakhmi Sherni		Hindi
2001	Shiva Ka Insaaf		Hindi
2001	Rakhail No 1		Hindi
2001	Rupa Rani Ramkali		Hindi
2001	Qatil Chudail		Hindi
2001	Main Hoon Qatil Jadugarni		Hindi
2001	Main Hoon Beauty Queen		Hindi
2001	Junglee Tarzan	Bela	Hindi
2001	Junglee Mohabbat		Hindi
2001	Heroine No. 1		Hindi
2001	Badla Sherni Ka		Hindi
2001	Aag Ke Sholay		Hindi
2001	Censor		Hindi
2001	Jungle Ki Sherni	Sherni/Daku Ruby	Hindi
2002	Zindagi Aur Maut	Rani	Hindi
2002	Sholabai		Hindi
2002	Return of Gadar - Ek Desh Premi		Hindi
2002	Prem Tapasya		Hindi
2002	Marshal		Hindi
2002	Jungle Hero	Nayantara, the dance	Hindi
2002	Husn Aur Talwar		Hindi
2002	Garibon Ka Daata		Hindi
2002	Reshma Aur Sultaan	Chittu	Hindi
2002	Duplicate Sholay	Basanti/Lajwanti	Hindi
2002	Darwaza		Hindi
2003	Shamsan Ghat	Soni	Hindi
2003	Pyasi Bhootni		Hindi
2003	Pyaasi	Kamini/Sapna	Hindi
2003	Pyaasa Haiwan	Kamini	Hindi
2003	Prem Sutra		Hindi
2003	Meri Ganga Ki Saugandh		Hindi
2003	Maut Ke Piche Maut		Hindi
2003	Kora Badan		Hindi
2003	Jungle Ke Sholay		Hindi
2003	Ek Raaz Mere Dil Mein Hai		Hindi
2003	Duplicate Jaani Dushman		Hindi
2003	Dangerous Night		Hindi
2003	Bindiya Aur Bandook Part 2		Hindi
2004	Raton Ki Raani (The Night Queen)	Rani a.k.a. Sapna a.k.a. Nisha	Hindi
2004	Sabse Badi Ganga Ki Saugandh		Hindi
2004	Khooni	Sapna, Shanker's wife	Hindi
2004	Kachhi Kali		Hindi
2004	Kaam Milan	Sapna	Hindi
2004	Kaam Jwala: The Fire	Roopa	Hindi
2004	Jungle Ka Sher	Ruby/Nagina	Hindi
2004	Junglee Sherni		Hindi
2004	Ek Raat Shaitaan Ke Saath	Anchal	Hindi
2004	Ek Na Mard		Hindi
2004	Cheekh	Sapna/Kamini	Hindi
2005	Khalnayak	Heroine (uncredited)	Hindi
2005	Gumnaam		Hindi
2005	Darinda		Hindi
2005	Garam	Bobby	Hindi
2005	Nalaik		Hindi
2005	Angoor		Hindi
2006	Virana		Hindi
2006	No Parking		Hindi
2006	Free Entry	Bobby	Hindi
2014	MMS Kaand		Hindi
2015	Sapna Ki Jawani	Sapna	Hindi
2018	Madam	Madam	Hindi
