= Khooni Ilaaka:The Prohibited Area =

1999 hindi film

- Film poster
- Directed by: Jitendra Chawda
- Produced by: Kajal Mukherjee
- Production company: Ishwar Films
- Release date: 14 May 1999
- Country: India
- Language: Hindi

Khooni Ilaaka: The Prohibited Area is a Hindi Horror movie of Bollywood directed by Jitendra Chawda and produced by Kajal Mukherjee. This film was released on 14 May 1999 in the banner of Ishwar Films.

== Plot ==
The story revolves around the activities of an evil spirit which is reborn to take vengeance against a family. One day all the family members decide to go outside leaving their younger sister at home. But they could not return due to some astonishing incident which happens due to that spirit. While they are going through a deadly forest area known as the Khooni Ilaaka they are attacked by the evil spirit. Long ago, a wicked Tantrik was killed by villagers and he cursed the area even after his horrific death. Being worried and without knowing this past, the sister and her boyfriend go to search for her brother and sister in-law.

== Cast ==
- Kishore Bhanushali
- Deepak Shirke
- Rami Reddy
- Swapna
- Jyoti Rana
- Vinod Tripathi
- Anil Nagrath
- Arif Khan
- Anuradha Sawant
