= Murdaa Ghar =

Murdaa Ghar (House of Corpses) is a Hindi horror movie of Bollywood directed by Kishan Shah and produced by Shakuntala Gohil. This film was released on 16 July 1999 under the banner of Mangla films.

== Cast ==
- Shakti Kapoor
- Neelam Kothari
- Jyoti Rana
- Anuradha Sawant
- Vinod Tripathi
- Anil Nagrath
- Satyen Kaul
- Raj Premi
