= Mohan Joshi =

Indian film, television and theatre actor

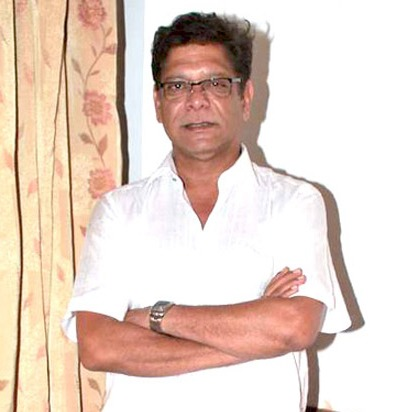
- Born: 12 July 1953 (age 73); Bangalore, Mysore State, India
- Education: Brihan Maharashtra College of Commerce
- Occupation: Actor
- Years active: 1982–present
- Spouse: Jyoti Joshi (m. 1975)
- Children: 1

Mohan Joshi (born 12 July 1953) is an Indian film, television theatre actor. He has worked in Hindi, Marathi and Bhojpuri films. He is recipient of a National Film Award, five Maharashtra State Film Awards and two Filmfare Awards Marathi.

== Career ==
Joshi started his career as a theatre artist in Pune. He was noticed in the play Kuryat Sada Tingalam. Along with Anand Abhyankar and Suhasini Deshpande, the show was performed more than 1000 times.

Joshi later on got various roles in Hindi and Marathi films. His 1993 comedy film Savat Mazi Ladki directed by Smita Talwalkar was quite successful. Joshi played the lead role of a doctor husband of actress Neena Kulkarni and who is engaged in an extra-marital affair with his junior doctor played by Varsha Usgaonkar. For his work in Tu Tithe Mee (1998), Joshi's work was appreciated. Produced by Smita Talwalkar and directed by Sanjay Surkar, the film was adjudged as the Best Feature Film in Marathi at the 46th National Film Awards. In their official citation, the jury noted Joshi's and his co-star Suhas Joshi's works by quoting "Beautiful performance by Mohan Joshi and Suhas Joshi are the highlights of the film." He won his only National Film Awards till now for the 1999 Marathi film Gharabaher as a Special Mention (Feature Film) "for his wonderfully controlled performance of a corrupt politician" at the 47th National Film Awards. In 2009, he played the lead role of Gadge Maharaj, a social reformer and saint from Maharashtra, in the film Debu.

Joshi also played various character and side roles in Hindi films and is known for his portrayal of negative roles. For the role of Tirpat Singh in the Hindi film Mrityudand (1997), Joshi received the Screen Award for Best Villain. His villainous role of Sadhu Yadav in the 2003 Hindi film Gangaajal directed by Prakash Jha was appreciated. This socio-political film was based on the Bhagalpur blindings that happened in 1980. He has also worked in Bhojpuri films.

Joshi stepped in the Hindi television industry through the show Jamuniya in 2010 that aired on Imagine TV.

Joshi was president of the Akhil Bharatiya Marathi Natya Parishad from 2003 to 2011 and then re-elected in 2013 to at present.

== Personal life ==
He is married to Jyoti Joshi in 1975 whom he met in Pune.

== Filmography ==
=== Films ===
Key
†	Denotes films that have not yet been released

Year	Title	Role	Language	Refs
1983	Ek Daav Bhutacha	Villain	Marathi	
1987	Khatyal Sasu Nathal Sun	Major Prakash Pandre	Marathi	
1988	Nashibwan	Ramchandra Khare	Marathi	
1988	Ek Gadi Baaki Anadi	Dinanath Pradhan	Marathi	
1991	Balidaan	Sadanand "Master" Kulkarni	Marathi	
1991	Bandalbaaz	Pradhan	Marathi	
1992	Hach Sunbaicha Bhau	Pundalik	Marathi	
1992	Jiwlaga	Resham's father	Marathi	
1992	Jaagruti	Om Prakash Sharma	Hindi	
1993	Sarech Sajjan	Vishwasrao	Marathi	
1993	Savat Mazi Ladki	Dr. Madhukar Hirve (Madhu)	Marathi	
1993	Aapli Manse	Raghunath's father	Marathi	
1993	Char Divas Sasuche	Deshmukh	Marathi	
1993	Bhookamp	Daya Patil	Hindi	
1994	Elaan	Baba Khan	Hindi	
1994	Imtihaan	KK	Hindi	
1994	Anth	ACP Kulkarni	Hindi	
1994	Gopi Kishan	Sawant	Hindi	
1994	Zaalim	Jaikaal	Hindi	
1995	Andolan	Dalvi	Hindi	
1995	Gaddaar	Mr.Gujral	Hindi	
1995	Hulchul	Shobhraj's friend	Hindi	
1995	Hum Dono	Shreechand	Hindi	
1995	Gundaraj	Rajbahadur Alias Baba Saheb	Hindi	
1995	The Gambler	Karianna	Hindi	
1995	Haqeeqat	Jagpati Bhavani Singh	Hindi	
1996	Himmat	Tabu's Father Brij Mohan	Hindi	
1996	Ek Tha Raja	Baba	Hindi	
1996	Papi Gudia	Ragahvan, Tantrik Channi guru	Hindi	
1996	Shastra	Rana	Hindi	
1996	Mafia	DCP Bapat	Hindi	
1996	Bhishma	Rana Saheb	Hindi	
1996	Krishna	Bhujang Rao	Hindi	
1996	Rangbaaz	Commissioner Mathur	Hindi	
1997	Salma Pe Dil Aa Gaya	Sardar Angara Khan	Hindi	
1997	Yeshwant	Salim Shaikh	Hindi	
1997	Mrityudand	Tirpat Singh	Hindi	
1997	Masoom	Barood	Hindi	
1997	Loha	Lukka	Hindi	
1997	Bhai	Ganesh	Hindi	
1997	Suraj	Neelkanth	Hindi	
1997	Ishq	Madam Jindal Kajol's Uncle	Hindi	
1998	Do Numbri	Sharma	Hindi	
1998	Phool Bane Patthar	Minister Garibdas Singh	Hindi	
1998	Purani Kabar	Mohan	Hindi	
1998	Vinashak – Destroyer	A.C.P. Amar Agnihotri	Hindi	
1998	2001: Do Hazaar Ek	Police Commissioner Malik		
1998	Aakrosh	Colonel Chavan		
1998	Tu Tithe Mee	Nanasaheb Date	Marathi	
1998	Salaakhen	Advocate Ashok Pradhan	Hindi	
1998	Humse Badhkar Kaun	Jabbar	Hindi	
1998	Major Saab	Parshuram Bihari	Hindi	
1998	Barood	Commissioner Gaur	Hindi	
1998	Gunda	Pote	Hindi	
1998	Sar Utha Ke Jiyo	Trikaal Singh	Hindi	
1999	Ladhai	Appasaheb	Marathi	
1999	Hai Kaun Woh	Tantrik	Hindi	
1999	Sikandar Sadak Ka	Chawla, Criminal Lawyer	Hindi	
1999	Daag: The Fire	Purshotam Jalan	Hindi	
1999	Kahani Kismat Ki	Manoj	Hindi	
1999	Lal Baadshah	Lawyer	Hindi	
1999	Lohpurush	Bhola Pandey	Hindi	
1999	Aarzoo	Rajpal	Hindi	
1999	Rajaji	Pratap Singh	Hindi	
1999	Hogi Pyaar Ki Jeet	Thakur Gajendra Singh	Hindi	
1999	Haseena Maan Jaayegi	Prem Nath	Hindi	
1999	Munnibai	Daku Mahakal	Hindi	
1999	Vaastav	Babbanrao Kadam (Home Minister)	Hindi	
1999	Gharabaher	Annasaheb	Marathi	
1999	Aai Thor Tujhe Upkar	Maheshrao	Marathi	
1999	Nirmala Macchindra Kamble	Yashwantrao Desai	Marathi	
1999	Ladhai	Appasaheb	Marathi	
1999	Bayko Aali Badloon	Yamraj	Marathi	
2000	Chehron Ke Peeche	Saley	Hindi	
2000	Apradhi Kou	Principal Dhawan	Hindi	
2000	Rahasya	Mohan	Hindi	
2000	Daku Ramkali	Dhanraj	Hindi	
2000	Krodh	Advocate Verma	Hindi	
2000	Baaghi	Assistant Commissioner of Police	Hindi	
2000	Daaku Dilruba	Thakur Jaagir Singh	Hindi	
2000	Bichhoo	Kiran's father	Hindi	
2000	Kunwara	Manmohan Singh	Hindi	
2000	Daku Ganga Jamuna	Daku Jwala Singh	Hindi	
2000	Daku Kali Bhawani	Daku	Hindi	
2000	Beti No. 1	Raghuveer Yadav	Hindi	
2000	Nidaan	Dr. Dhawan	Marathi	
2001	Rupa Rani Ramkali	Daku Gujjar Singh	Hindi	
2002	Maseeha	DCP Shrivastav	Hindi	
2003	Not Only Mrs. Raut	Advocate Dada Vishnu Dandavate	Marathi	
2003	Khanjar : The Knife	Kumar	Hindi	
2003	Shiva Ka Insaaf	Amit	Hindi	
2003	Gangaajal	Sadhu Yadav	Hindi	
2003	Tada	Shankar	Hindi	
2003	Zameen	Brigadier Malik	Hindi	
2003	Baghban	Khuber Desai, Hotel Owner	Hindi	
2004	Police Force: An Inside Story	ACP Pratap Bhosale	Hindi	
2004	Garv: Pride and Honour	Advocate Kulkarni	Hindi	
2004	AK-47	Minister Trikaal	Hindi	
2004	Suvasinichi Hi Satwa Pariksha	Dadasaheb Kulkarni	Marathi	
2005	Mr. Prime Minister	Raja Sahab	Hindi	
2005	Dhamkee	Chaturbhuj Pratap Singh	Hindi	
2005	Sarivar Sari	Baba	Marathi	
2006	Yanda Kartavya Aahe	Manager Phatak	Marathi	
2006	Sail	Prof. Ratnakar	Marathi	
2007	Tula Shikvin Changlach Dhada	Film Director	Marathi	
2007	Mukkam Post London	Omkar Hamparvar	Marathi	
2007	Mumbaicha Shahane	Deshmukh	Marathi	
2007	Janam Janam Ke Saath	Babu	Bhojpuri	
2008	Doghat Tisra Aata Sagla Visra	Balwant Kadu Patil	Marathi	
2009	Mata Ekvira Navsala Pavli	Sarpanch	Marathi	
2009	Tukya Tukavila Nagya Nachvila	Priest	Marathi	
2009	Be Dune Sade Char	Anant Kitturkar	Marathi	
2009	Agnidivya	Anandrao Desai	Marathi	
2009	Lagli Paij	Ramakant Kelkar	Marathi	
2009	Vairi Mangalsutracha	Aamdar Kale Patil	Marathi	
2009	Kartavya	Krishnakant Godbole	Marathi	
2010	Debu	Gadge Maharaj	Marathi	
2010	Haapus	Appa	Marathi	
2010	Irada Pakka	Adhya 's father	Marathi	
2010	Kon Aahe Re Tikde	Shinde	Marathi	
2010	Tata Birla Ani Laila	Kolhe	Marathi	
2010	Agnipariksha	Aabasaheb	Marathi	
2011	Dhava Dhav	Gabbar	Marathi	
2011	Ashi Fasli Nanachi Tang	Nana Joshi	Marathi	
2011	Mamachya Rashila Bhacha	Jagu Patil	Marathi	
2012	Saheb	Bhujangrao Patil	Marathi	
2012	Mokala Shwas	Unnamed	Marathi	Cameo appearance
2012	Dum Asel Tar	Raosaheb	Marathi	
2012	Yedyanchi Jatra	Bhangade Patil	Marathi	
2013	Rangkarmi	Dwarakanath Kambli	Marathi	
2014	Love U Crazy Girl	Khushi 's Dad	Marathi	
2014	Cappucino	Shashikant	Marathi	
2015	Deool Band	Swami Samarth	Marathi	
2015	Dhurandhar Bhatawdekar	Bhatwadekar	Marathi	
2015	Aawhan	Home Minister	Marathi	
2015	Bugadi Maazi Sandli Ga	Suryakant	Marathi	
2015	Black Home	Khalnayak	Hindi	
2015	Shasan	Minister	Marathi	
2015	Phera	Mohanrao	Marathi	
2015	The Justice and The Bastards	Unnamed	Hindi	
2016	Vrundavan	Krish 's father	Marathi	
2016	Mr. & Mrs. Sadachari	Shiva's Father	Marathi	
2016	Kiran Kulkarni vs Kiran Kulkarni	Kiran's Father	Marathi	
2016	Jaundya Na Balasaheb	Annasaheb	Marathi	
2017	Fugay	Deshmukh	Marathi	
2017	Yeh Hai India	Minister	Hindi	
2017	Hameer	Jashwant	Gujarati	
2017	Tabadala	Suryakant's Father	Bhojpuri	
2018	Pushpak Vimaan	Tatya	Marathi	
2018	Mulshi Pattern	Sakha Patil	Marathi	
2018	Ani... Dr. Kashinath Ghanekar	Bhalji Pendharkar	Marathi	
2019	66 Sadashiv	Shrikhande	Marathi	
2019	Berij Vajabaki	Chiplunkar Sir	Marathi	
2019	Dome	Dhaku Patil	Marathi	
2020	Miss U Miss	Dinkarrao Mohite	Marathi	
2022	Goshta Eka Paithanichi	Karandikar	Marathi	
2022	Dharmaveer	Sameer's father	Marathi	
2022	Sarsenapati Hambirrao	Aurangzeb	Marathi	
2022	Har Har Mahadev	Dhondiba	Marathi	
2022	Goshta Eka Paithanichi	Karandikar	Marathi	
2022	Rashtra	Prem Kumar	Marathi	
2023	Aalay Mazya Rashila	Col Pathak	Marathi	
2023	Saath Sobat	Dr. Bhagwan Raje	Marathi	
2023	Chhapa Kata	Shanaya's grandfather	Marathi	
2023	Duvidha	Aabasaheb Karve	Marathi	Short film
2024	Bebasi	Tatysaheb Joglekar	Marathi	Short film
2024	Chhatrapati Sambhaji	Annaji	Marathi	
2024	Sangharsh Yodha Manoj Jarange Patil	Raosaheb Jarange	Marathi	
2025	Badass Ravi Kumar	Minister	Hindi	
2025	Smart Sunbai	Resort Manager	Marathi	
2026	Deool Band 2	Swami Samarth	Marathi	
2026	Viral Girls	Nange Patil	Marathi	
TBA	Abhaya †	TBA	Marathi	

=== Television ===
Year	Title	Role	Notes
1998	Do Aur Do Paanch	Radha's husband	
2006	Oon Paaus	Gowardhan	
2008-2010	Agnihotra	Chintamani Agnihotri	
2009	Krupasindhu	Samarth	Episodic role
2012	Eka Lagnachi Dusri Goshta	Shripad Kale	
2013	Eka Lagnachi Tisri Goshta	Dattaram Newale	
2013	Gunda Purush Dev	Family Head	
2016	Kahe Diya Pardes	Madhusudan Sawant	
2019	Jeev Zala Yedapisa	Yashwant Lashkare	
2020-2021	Aggabai Sasubai	Dattatray Kulkarni	
2021	Aggabai Sunbai	Dattatray Kulkarni	
2021-2022	Majhi Tujhi Reshimgath	Jagannath Chaudhari	
2022	Sant Gajanan Shegaviche	Swami Samarth	

=== Theatre ===
- Aasu Ani Hasu
- Gadhvacha Lagna
- Godi Gulabi
- Goshta Janmantarichi
- Kalam 302
- Karti Kaljat Ghusali
- Kuryat Sada Mangalam
- Mi Revati Deshpande
- Nath Ha Majha
- Nati Goti
- Purush
- Sangeet Mrichakatik
- Sukhant
- Tarun Turk Mhatare Ark
- Double Cross
- Aaranyak
- Shree Tashi Sau
- Natsamrat
- Sumi Ani Amhi
- Rayagadala jeva jag yete

=== Web series ===
Year	Title	Role	Platform
2019	M.O.M. - Mission Over Mars	Sharad Gokhale	ALTBalaji and ZEE5
2022	RaanBaazaar	Sayaji Patil	Planet Marathi

== Awards and nominations ==
Year	Category	Work	Result
National Film Awards
1999	Special Mention	Gharabaher	Won
Maharashtra State Film Awards
1996	Best Actor	Raosaheb	Won
1999	Best Special Actor	Gharabaher	Won
2005	Best Supporting Actor	Sarivar Sari	Won
2010	Best Comedian	Be Dune Sadechar	Won
2013	Best Special Actor	Rangkarmi	Won
Filmfare Awards Marathi
1997	Best Actor	Raosaheb	Won
1998	Best Actor	Tu Tithe Mee	Won
2015	Best Supporting Actor	Deool Band	Nominated
Zee Marathi Utsav Natyancha Awards
2021	Zee Marathi Lifetime Achievement Award	Overall Contribution in Marathi cinema & television	Won
