= Payal Malhotra =

Indian actress

- Born: 28 March 1980 (age 46); Delhi, India
- Occupations: Film actress, producer and director
- Father: Harmesh Malhotra

Payal Malhotra (born 28 March 1980) is an Indian actress and producer. She has appeared in Hindi films and Indian television series. She acted in the Malayalam film Keerthi Chakra in 2006. She is best known for her roles in the Bollywood films Kaho Na Pyaar Hai.

She was also seen in the Bollywood films Hum Tumhare Hain Sanam, Heera Lal Panna Lal, and Aaag Hi Aag.

== Filmography ==
Worked as Sheetal Pager in Benaam (1999).
