= Munnibai =

1999 Hindi film

Munnibai is a Hindi low budget action movie of Bollywood directed by Kanti Shah and produced by Gulab Seikh. This film was released on 30 July 1999 under the banner of Gulab Films.

== Plot ==
This is a revenge story of a lady dacoit Munnibai. Her family was killed by a gang of dacoits and Munnibai kills the chief of this gang. The Chief's daughter Hirabai is another lady dacoit who tries to kill Munni in retaliation but finally Munni kills her instead.

== Cast ==
- Dharmendra as Daku Sher Singh
- Johnny Lever as Kammal Khan
- Rajesh Vivek as Daku Raghav Singh
- Joginder as Daku Hakim / Daku Jagga
- Mohan Joshi as Daku Mahakaal
- Sapna (actress) as Hirabai
- Anil Nagrath as Daku Kala Singh
- Durgesh Nandini as Munnibai
- Gulshan Rana as Inspector Shankar
- Joy Thakur as Ahuja
- Vinod Tripathi as Inspector Aslam Khan
- Arun Mathur as Police Commissioner Raghuveer
