= Lohpurush =

- Promotional Poster
- Directed by: Hersh Kinnu
- Produced by: R. S. Dhaka; Hardeep Singh; Gopal Kwatra
- Starring: Dharmendra; Jaya Prada; Monica Bedi; Mohan Joshi; Ashish Vidyarthi; Mukesh Rishi; Rohini Hattangadi
- Music by: Dilip Sen-Sameer Sen
- Distributed by: Shri Gopal Pictures
- Release date: 8 January 1999
- Country: India
- Language: Hindi

Lohpurush (transl. Iron Man) is a 1999 Indian Hindi language Bollywood action film directed by Hersh Kinnu, starring Dharmendra, Jaya Prada, Mohan Joshi and Ashish Vidyarthi in pivotal roles.

== Plot ==
Ajeet Singh is an honest and loyal bodyguard of a Chief Minister. Corrupt party leader Bhola Pandey wants to kill the Chief Minister to occupy the post of CM. Ajeet Singh is falsely implicated for killing his wife and sentenced to life imprisonment.

== Cast ==
- Dharmendra as Ajit Singh
- Jaya Prada as Aarti
- Rohini Hattangadi as Chief Minister Gayatri Devi
- Mohan Joshi as Bhola Pandey
- Monica Bedi as Rashmi
- Deep Dhillon as D.C.P. Chaturvedi
- Ashish Vidyarthi as Inspector Salim Hindustani
- Mukesh Rishi as Ganesh Tandiya
- Deepak Shirke as Shankar Tandiya
- Satyen Kappu as Ramesh Goel
- Rohit Kumar as Rahul Verma
- Mushtaq Khan as Havaldar P.K. Mast
- Brij Gopal as Jeeva
- Ankush Mohit as Javed
- Vikas Anand as C.B.I. Director Vikas Malhotra
- Arjun as Babu Hatela/Inspector Kulkarni
- Shashi Kiran as Public Prosecutor Sadanand

== Music ==
1. "Bairan Bani Yeh Raina Hai" – Udit Narayan, Kavita Krishnamurthy, Ila Arun
2. "Bandh Kamre Mein Ek Ladka Ho" – Kumar Sanu, Alisha Chinoy
3. "Main Jatt Ludhiyanewala" – Udit Narayan, Alka Yagnik
4. "Rooth Ke Jaanewali Nakhrewali" – Kumar Sanu, Poornima
5. "Todke Pinjra" – Udit Narayan, Kavita Krishnamurthy
6. "O Jaan-E-Man" – Asha Bhosle, Abhijeet
