= Daag: The Fire =

- Theatrical release poster
- Directed by: Raj Kanwar
- Written by: Raj Kanwar; Jainendra Jain (dialogues)
- Screenplay by: Robin Bhatt; Akash Khurana
- Produced by: Raj Kanwar
- Starring: Sanjay Dutt; Chandrachur Singh; Mahima Chaudhry; Shakti Kapoor
- Cinematography: Harmeet Singh
- Edited by: A. Muthu
- Music by: Rajesh Roshan
- Distributed by: Inderjit Films
- Release date: 12 February 1999
- Running time: 165 minutes
- Country: India
- Language: Hindi
- Budget: ₹67.5 million
- Box office: ₹202.8 million

Daag: The Fire (transl. Fire/Shoot) is a 1999 Indian Hindi-language action thriller film written, produced and directed by Raj Kanwar, starring Sanjay Dutt, Chandrachur Singh and Mahima Chaudhry in the lead roles. The film received mixed reviews but was successful at the box office. The plot was inspired from the 1991 American film Regarding Henry.

== Plot ==
Former Indian soldier Karan Singh wants to seek revenge for his upright father, Satya Prakash Singh, who was wrongfully jailed. His sentence resulted from a false charge and prosecution by a shrewd lawyer, Ravi Verma, backed by the latter's father-in-law, Singhal.

Kajal is the wife of the corrupt Ravi, who can win almost any court case. During a court case, he falsely accuses and gets a righteous man convicted of corruption, who then commits suicide out of shame. His son, Major Karan, swears revenge. One day, after a party that Kajal and Ravi attend, he fires a pistol directly at Ravi but Kajal, saves her husband using her body as a shield. Karan fires a second time, and Ravi is shot in the spinal cord, loses part of his memory as the doctors diagnose him with 'retrograde amnesia".

In the hospital, Kajal succumbs to her injury. In an attempt to restore Ravi's memory, Singhal requests the help of a street woman, Kajri, who looks exactly like Kajal, to pretend to be Ravi's wife temporarily.

However, the obstinate Karan is still seeking his revenge by stalking Ravi in the hospital and hatches a plan to kill Ravi. Karan and Kajri collect all the evidence that proves Karan's father's innocence. Ravi regains his memory and starts to sympathise with Karan. With the help of Kajri, he promises Karan that once he recovers fully, he will prove to the court that Karan's father was actually innocent but wrongly persecuted, presenting all the proof. Learning of this turn of events, Singhal turns the tables on Ravi.

A significant family feud ensues between Singhal and Ravi. Ravi, with the help of Karan, wins the final court case, and finally, the real perpetrators are placed behind bars (including Singhal, who had instigated this). Ravi and Kajri unite happily, and Karan gives himself up to the police voluntarily and asks Ravi to defend his case in the court.

== Cast ==
- Sanjay Dutt as Captain Karan Singh
- Chandrachur Singh as Ravi Verma
- Mahima Chaudhry - as Kajal Verma (Nee Singhal) / Kajri (Double Role)
- Sushma Seth as Tai
- Shakti Kapoor - as Dr. Anand
- Sachin Khedekar - as Inspector Vinay Kumar
- Raj Babbar - as Mr. Singhal
- Kunickaa Sadanand - as Nurse Lily
- Johnny Lever- as Compounder Sunder
- Shivaji Satam - as Satya Prakash Singh, Karan's father
- Mohan Joshi as Purushottam Jalan
- Harish Patel as Bihari
- Neha Pendse as child

== Soundtrack ==
Daag: The Fire

Soundtrack album by Rajesh Roshan
- Released: 30 December 1998
- Genre: Feature film soundtrack
- Label: T-Series

All songs were composed by Rajesh Roshan and lyrics by Sameer. "Pardesiya Itna Bata Sajna, "Dil Deewana Na Jaane ( Anuradha Paudwal solo)" was very famous at the time of the movie release. The song "Dil Deewana" borrows its charanam from "Pehli Pehli Baar Mohabbat Ki Hai" from Sirf Tum (1999).

#	Title	Singer(s)
1	"Dil Deewana"	Kumar Sanu, Anuradha Paudwal
2	"Piya Lagi Lagan"	Anuradha Paudwal, Jaspinder Narula
3	"Dil Deewana Naa Jaane Kab (Female)"	Anuradha Paudwal
4	"Pardesiya Itna Bata Sajna"	Udit Narayan, Anuradha Paudwal
5	"Pyar Hamein Pyar Tum"	Udit Narayan, Alka Yagnik
6	"Lucky Kabootar"	Sukhwinder Singh
7	"Chehra Tera Chehra"	Kumar Sanu, Anuradha Paudwal
8	"Dil Dhak Dhak Dhadke"	Jaspinder Narula
9	"Pyar Hamein Pyar Tum (Instrumental)"	

== Reception ==
Though Mahima Chaudhry dominated the movie a critic from Deccan Herald opined that "Sanjay Dutt runs along the fringes of the storyline, making occasional incursions of zero impact. Chandrachur. with his flair and self-assured air puts Sanjay’s laboured outbursts to shame. A few spirited songs by Rajesh Roshan add some spice".
