= Jayendra Thakur =

Indian gangster (born 1953)

- Born: Jayendra Vishnu Thakur; December 1953 (age 72); Vasai-Virar, Palghar
- Other name: BHAI THAKUR
- Occupations: Politics, crime
- Known for: Smuggling, extortion, political killings
- Political party: Indian National Congress (1970-1995), Bahujan Vikas Aghadi (2009-Present)
- Relatives: MLA Hitendra Thakur (Brother)

Jayendra Vishnu Thakur most commonly known as Bhai Thakur is a former underworld gangster who has been in jail multiple times under several charges including smuggling, murder and amongst various other cases. He hails from palghar.

== Personal life ==
He is elder brother of politician and chairman of regional political party Bahujan Vikas Aaghadi (BVA), Hitendra Thakur, a MLA from Vasai. His nephew, Kshitij Thakur is a MLA from Nalasopara.

== Career ==
He wields enormous influence within the Vasai-Virar belt owing to his former criminal background, his brother's political party and the Viva Group, owned by his family which controls multiple construction projects in the region. He has allegedly lost an eye in attack by a rival gang during his gangster days. In 1990, he is alleged to have helped in successfully fielding his brother, Hitendra Thakur in Vidhan Sabha elections. It is also said that Petroleum Minister Ram Naik took his help in the last two Lok Sabha polls through his brother Hitendra.

== Crimes and conviction ==
He was accused in the Suresh Dube and Nizam Ansari murder case in 1989.

The list of cases against Jayendra alia is long - extortion, criminal intimidation, attempt to murder, murder.

He was put behind bars after Sudhakarrao Naik took over as Chief Minister.
