= Shakti Kapoor =

Indian actor and comedian (born 1952)

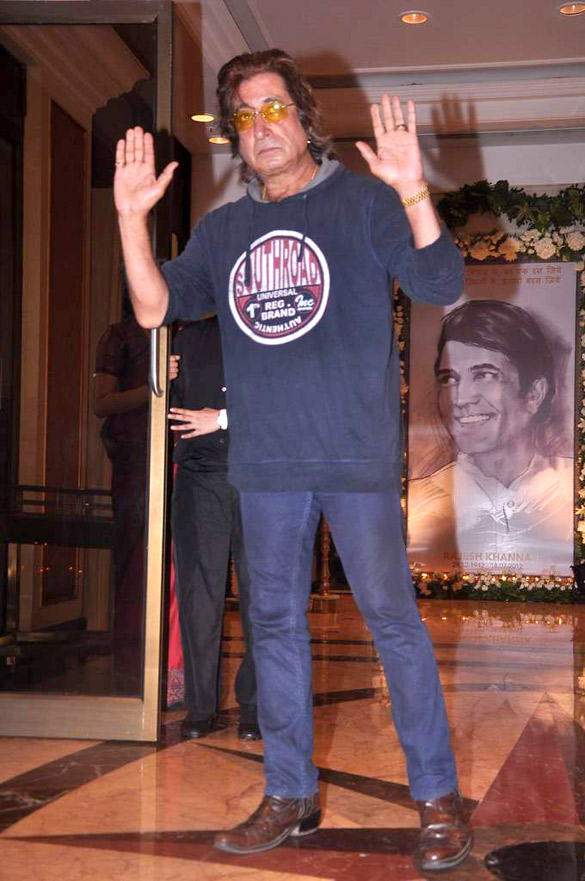
- Kapoor in 2012
- Born: Sunil Kapoor; 3 September 1952 (age 74); Delhi, India
- Education: Kirori Mal College; Film and Television Institute of India
- Occupations: Actor; comedian
- Years active: 1974–present
- Works: Full list
- Spouse: Shivangi Kapoor (m. 1982)
- Children: Siddhanth Kapoor (son); Shraddha Kapoor (daughter)
- Family: See Kapoor family

Shakti Kapoor (born Sunil Kapoor; 3 September 1952) is an Indian actor and comedian who appears in Bollywood films. Known for his villainous and comic roles in Hindi films, he has featured in over 700 films. In the 1980s and 1990s, Kapoor teamed up with actors Asrani and Kader Khan as the comical or evil team in over 100 films. He was a contestant in the Indian reality show Bigg Boss in 2011. He contested in Bigg Boss to prove to his children he can stay away from alcohol.

== Early life ==
Kapoor was born in Delhi into a Punjabi Hindu family. His father ran a clothes shop in Connaught Place, New Delhi. After a long struggle in Bollywood, Kapoor was spotted by Sunil Dutt while he was making Rocky to launch his son Sanjay Dutt. He was then cast as the antagonist in the movie. But Dutt felt that his name "Sunil Kapoor" wouldn't do justice to his villainous stint and hence, "Shakti Kapoor" was born.

== Personal life ==
Kapoor is married to Shivangi Kapoor (elder sister of actresses Padmini Kolhapure and Tejaswini Kolhapure) and has two children, a son Siddhanth Kapoor and a daughter Shraddha Kapoor. He resides in Juhu, Mumbai.

In 2024, four members of a gang were arrested for kidnapping actor Mushtaq Khan from the Delhi airport, and according to the police, they were also plotting to kidnap Shakti Kapoor on the pretext of inviting him to an event, but the deal fell through due to a high advance request.

== Career ==
Shakti Kapoor studied at the Film and Television Institute of India (FTII). As a struggler in Bollywood, he initially did many inconsequential roles in movies, all the while looking out for a suitable role as a leading man. He started his Bollywood journey with movie Khel Khilari Ka (starring Darmendra and Hema Malini) in 1977. The years 1980–81 established Shakti Kapoor as an actor in Bollywood with two of his movies, where he was villain – Qurbani and Rocky. In 1983, Kapoor had roles in Himmatwala and the Subhash Ghai directed movie Hero. Kapoor had played villain roles in both these movies.

In the 1990s, he often diversified to positive comic roles and performed them with equal finesse in movies like Raja Babu. He has been nominated for the Filmfare Award in the Best Comedian category and won once, for his performance as Nandu in David Dhawan's film, Raja Babu. Some of his comic roles have been as Inspector Bhinde in Insaaf, Prasad in Baap Numbri Beta Dus Numbri, Crime Master Gogo in Andaz Apna Apna, Tohfa, as Batuknath in ChaalBaaz and as Goonga in Bol Radha Bol.

In March 2005, India TV released a video allegedly showing Shakti Kapoor asking for sexual favour from an undercover reporter posing as an aspiring actress, in return for entry into the film industry. He told the undercover reporter: "I want to make love to you ... kiss you". According to India TV, this was a sting operation to expose the phenomenon of casting couch prevalent in Bollywood. This incident sparked a controversy in Bollywood and Kapoor was banned by the Film & Television Producers Guild of India. Association of Indian Motion Pictures and TV Programme Producers decided not to ban him as no allegations against him were proved. One week later, however, the Film & Television Producers Guild lifted the ban. Kapoor claimed that the video clip in question was doctored and he has been framed. He said that the undercover reporter met him several times and threatened to commit suicide if he did not come to the hotel room she had booked.

Kapoor has been a reference for mimicry artistes who emulate his style and dialogues such as "Aaaooo Lolita" from the movie Tohfa, "Main Nanha sa Chotta sa Bachcha Hoon" from the movie Chaalbaaz and "Nandu sabka bandhu, samajhta nahi hai yaar" from the movie Raja Babu. Since 2000, Kapoor is a regular fixture in Priyadarshan films like Hungama, Hulchul, Chup Chup Ke, Malamaal Weekly and the Malayalam remake Bhagam Bhag. He also acted in a few Bengali films of Kolkata, Odia film and in an Assamese feature film. In 2011, he was in the reality television show Bigg Boss 5 as one of the contestants. He has appeared in the musical comedy Aasman Se Gire Khajoor Pe Atke with his sister-in-law Padmini Kolhapure. He is also the brand ambassador of Servokon.

== Accolades ==
Year	Award	Category	Film	Result
1984	Filmfare Awards	Best Performance in a Comic Role	Mawaali	Nominated
1985	Filmfare Awards	Best Performance in a Comic Role	Tohfa	Nominated
1995	Filmfare Awards	Best Performance in a Comic Role	Raja Babu	Won
1995	Filmfare Awards	Best Performance in a Comic Role	Andaz Apna Apna	Nominated
1997	Filmfare Awards	Best Performance in a Comic Role	Loafer	Nominated
1998	Filmfare Awards	Best Performance in a Comic Role	Judwaa	Nominated
