= Aman Ke Farishtey =

- Lobby card
- Directed by: Kader Kashmiri
- Written by: Kader Kashmiri
- Produced by: Sohan Bhatia; Parvin Kotak
- Starring: Dev Anand; Javed Jaffrey; Aashif Sheikh
- Music by: Bappi Lahiri
- Production company: Sohan Art International
- Release date: 20 May 2016
- Running time: 137 minutes
- Country: India
- Language: Hindi
- Budget: ₹7,000,000 (US$83,000)
- Box office: ₹750,000 (US$8,900)

Aman Ke Farishtey (also titled Aman Ke Farisshtey) is an Indian action film directed by Kader Kashmiri and produced by Pravin Kotak and Sohan Bhatia under banner of Sohan Art International. The film stars Dev Anand, Hema Malini, Javed Jaffrey, Aasif Sheikh and Ekta Sohini in pivotal roles along with Roopa Ganguly, Kiran Kumar and Kader Khan in supporting roles. Aman ke Farishtey has not been released yet in India apart from Mumbai territory. It was released after death of Dev Anand in the year 2016.

== Cast ==
- Dev Anand as Paramveer
- Hema Malini as Geeta (Paramveer's Wife)
- Javed Jaffrey as Amar
- Aasif Sheikh as Vikram
- Ekta Sohini as Reeta
- Roopa Ganguly as Rupa
- Kiran Kumar as Sher Singh
- Kader Khan as Colonel Ranjeet
- Sonia Albizuri as doctor

== Soundtrack ==
No.	Title	Singer(s)	Length
1.	"Aman Ke Farishtey"	Javed Jaffrey
2.	"Babli Babli"	Hema Sardesai, Sudesh Bhosle
3.	"Bom Mat Marna"	Amit Kumar, Sarika Kapoor
4.	"Maiya Teri Jyot Jale"	Mohammed Aziz
5.	"Mile Jo Dil Se Dil"	Anupama Deshpande
6.	"Sare Jahan Se Achha"	Mohammed Aziz

== Box office ==
Aman Ke Farishtey earned a total amount of ₹750,000 (US$8,900) in Indian and overseas markets and was declared a box office bomb.
