= Basanti Tangewali =

- Directed by: Kanti Shah
- Produced by: Kanti Shah
- Starring: Ekta Sohini; Sadashiv Amrapurkar; Shakti Kapoor; Dalip Tahil
- Music by: Dilip Sen-Sameer Sen
- Production company: Mangla Films
- Release date: 1 May 1992
- Language: Hindi

Basanti Tangewali is a 1992 Hindi drama film directed and produced by Kanti Shah, and starring Ekta Sohini, Kader Khan, Sadashiv Amrapurkar and Shakti Kapoor in the key roles.

== Plot ==
The film revolves with the life of Basanti, the Tangawali of legendary Hindi movie Sholay and her twin sister who becomes a dacoit later.

== Cast ==
- Ekta Sohini as Basanti
- Kader Khan as Insp Aslam Khan / Bashir Khan
- Sadashiv Amrapurkar as Daku Tatya
- Shakti Kapoor as Popatlal
- Dalip Tahil as Nilesh
- Kiran Kumar as Inspector Arjun
- Vijay Saxena as Amar
- Avtar Gill as Pratap
- Ishrat Ali as Thakur Lambu Atta
