= Chudail No. 1 =

1999 Hindi film directed by R. Kumar

- Directed by: R. Kumar
- Produced by: Gautam Dhariwal
- Starring: Shehzad Khan; Razak Khan
- Production company: Rachna Cine Arts
- Release date: 16 July 1999
- Country: India
- Language: Hindi

Chuudail No. 1 is a 1999 Indian Hindi-language horror film directed by R. Kumar and produced by Gautam Dhariwal. The film was released on 16 July 1999 under the banner of Rachna Cine Arts.

== Plot ==
The film starts with a threatening phone call where a lady is asked to hand over a secret file otherwise they will kill her father. Finally the group of goons kill her father mercilessly and rape the lady. They escape leaving her to die. While police officer Vicky is transferred to the area, the vengeful ghost of the lady possesses Vicky's wife and starts to murder the goons one by one.

== Cast ==
- Shehzad Khan
- Razak Khan
- Dinesh Hingoo
- Rakhi Sawant
- Rajesh Vivek
- Sudhir
- Raj Kiran
- Mac Mohan
- Deepika Chikhalia
- Ishrat Ali
- Kaizar Khan
- Kiran Ali
- Gautam
- Pushpa Verma
- Anish Mathur
