= Razak Khan =

Indian actor (1951–2016)

Abdur Razak Khan
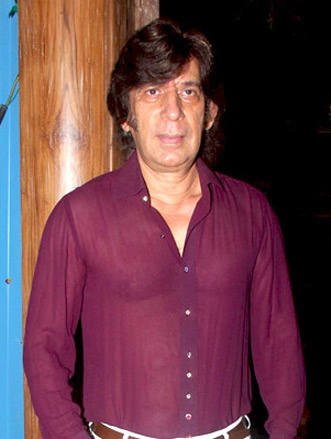
- Born: 28 March 1951; Byculla, Mumbai, India
- Died: 1 June 2016 (aged 65); Mumbai, Maharashtra, India
- Occupation: Actor
- Years active: 1990–2016
- Height: 1.75 m (5 ft 9 in)
- Children: 4

Abdur Razak Khan (28 March 1951 – 1 June 2016) was an Indian actor who has worked in Bollywood films. Khan was noted for supporting and comic roles. He was known for his comic role of Manikchand in the 1999 Abbas–Mustan directed film Baadshah, as Ninja Chacha in the 1999 film Hello Brother, and as Takkar Pehelwan in Akhiyon Se Goli Maare. His noted last film, Welcome M1LL10NS was released in 2018.

== Personal life ==
Khan was born in Byculla, Mumbai, Maharashtra, India. Khan moved to the United Kingdom during the 1980s to focus on his stage career, but frequently traveled to India for Bollywood movie roles. Khan was married and had four children.

== Acting career ==
Khan began his onscreen journey with a small role in the television show, Nukkad (1986–87) as 'Ullasbhai', and made his Hindi film debut with Roop Ki Rani Choron Ka Raja (1993). He acted in more than 100 films during his 23-year-long career. He was last seen in Ghoomketu (2020). His other noteworthy performances were in Raja Hindustani (1996), Hello Brother (1999), Hera Pheri (2000), Partner (2007) and Action Jackson (2014).

== Death ==
Khan died around 12:30 AM on 1 June 2016, following a heart attack. He was rushed to the Holy Family Hospital in Bandra, where a doctor declared him dead on arrival. He was buried at Byculla on 2 June 2016.

== Filmography ==
=== Film ===
Year	Title	Role	Notes
1990	Agneekaal	Janta	
1992	Meera Ka Mohan	Man on street whom Preeti ask to fix the fuse	Uncredited
1993	Roop Ki Rani Choron Ka Raja	Keshav	
1993	Hum Hain Kamaal Ke		
1993	Dil Tera Aashiq	Henchman	
1993	Chandra Mukhi	Sumbha	
1993	Teri Payal Mere Geet		
1994	Mohra	Rizwaan (Jibraan's Brother)	
1994	Amaanat		
1994	Yaar Gaddar	Baba	
1994	Ikke Pe Ikka		
1995	Dance Party		
1995	Hum Dono	Plane Passenger (with sunglasses)	
1995	Akele Hum Akele Tum	Babulal	
1995	Baazi		
1996	Chaahat	Pooja's Brother	
1996	Daraar	Bedang Lucknowi, Shayar	
1996	Raja Hindustani	Taxi driver	Uncredited
1996	Papi Gudia	Jaggu	
1997	Yeshwant	Dancer at wedding party	
1997	Koyla	Impotent party guest	Uncredited
1997	Kaalia	Raj Santopi	
1997	Sanam	Man with broken leg	
1997	Loha	Munna Mobile	
1997	Ishq	Nadi Dinna Changezi	
1998	Vaettiya Madichu Kattu		Tamil film
1998	Pyaar Kiya To Darna Kya	Bholu	
1998	Gharwali Baharwali		
1998	Ghulam		
1998	Iski Topi Uske Sarr	Akubhai Pakuli	
1998	Angaaray	Jaggu's friend	
1998	Gunda	Lucky Chikna	
1998	Bade Miyan Chote Miyan	Kalim Dhila	
1998	China Gate	Sadhuram	
1998	Yeh Aashiqui Meri		
1998	Hero Hindustani	Other Butler	
1999	Lafdaa		
1999	Chudail No. 1		
1999	Jaanam Samjha Karo		
1999	Anari No.1	Rajju Tabela	
1999	Kartoos	Havaldar	
1999	Rajaji	Bulldozer	
1999	Haseena Maan Jaayegi	Fainku	
1999	Baadshah	Manikchand	
1999	Hello Brother	Ninja Chacha	
1999	Heera Lal Panna Lal	Babu	
1999	Khoobsurat	Chiman	Special Appearance
1999	Dhandgad Dhinga	Tony Tapre	
2000	Champakali		
2000	Mela		
2000	Dacait		
2000	Daku Ramkali		
2000	Papa the Great	Ballu Phelwan's Henchman	
2000	Hera Pheri	Kabira's gang member	
2000	Gang		
2000	Jung		
2000	Joru Ka Ghulam	Fida Hussain	
2000	Tarkieb	Dr. Sunder Trivedi	
2000	Har Dil Jo Pyar Karega	Dance master	
2000	Hamara Dil Aapke Paas Hai	Balu's friend	
2000	Shikari		
2000	Beti No. 1	Talwar Singh Chura	
2000	Khiladi 420	Gawas	
2000	Jallad No. 1		
2000	Dahshat		
2001	Sali Gharwali Aur Bahar Wali		
2001	Ramgadh Ki Ramkali		
2001	Madam No 1		
2001	Biwi aur Padosan		
2001	Galiyon Ka Badshah		
2001	Kuch Khatti Kuch Meethi	Baloo	
2001	Bhairav	P.K. Mast	
2001	Baghaawat – Ek Jung		
2001	Jagira		
2001	Ek Lootere		
2001	Zaroorat		
2001	Mujhe Meri Biwi Se Bachaao	Police Inspector 1	
2001	Lajja	Francis	
2001	Nayak	Topi's father-in-law (cameo)	
2001	Kyo Kii... Main Jhuth Nahin Bolta	Kaala Bhai	
2001	Aamdani Atthani Kharcha Rupaiyaa	Taxi driver	
2001	Ittefaq	Pandit (Astrologer)	
2001	Dal: The Gang	Khujli	
2002	Jo Dar Gaya Samjho Mar Gaya		
2002	Haan Maine Bhi Pyaar Kiya	Dil-phenk Hyderabadi	
2002	Tumko Na Bhool Paayenge	Dilbar Khan	
2002	Kitne Door Kitne Paas	Razzaq	
2002	Pyaar Diwana Hota Hai	Mute Painter	
2002	Hum Kisi Se Kum Nahin	Munna Bhai's man	
2002	Kyaa Dil Ne Kahaa	Chander	
2002	Akhiyon Se Goli Maare	Faiyaz Takkar (Takkar Pehelwan)	
2002	Chor Machaaye Shor	Khali Anthony	
2002	Annarth	Ulhas Bhai	
2002	Rishtey		
2002	Chalo Ishq Ladaaye	Munna Hatela	
2002	Satyamev Jayate		
2002	Marshal	P.K. Mast / Michael	
2002	Ek Aur Visphot	Madman (commentator)	
2002	Bharat Bhagya Vidhata	Jhamurey	
2003	Tantrik Shakti	Baba	
2003	Anokha Anubhav		
2003	Talaash: The Hunt Begins	Razak Khan	
2003	Kucch To Hai	Hotel Employee	
2003	Baaz: A Bird in Danger	Nathuram Nada	
2003	Hungama	Babu Bisleri	
2003	Kuch Naa Kaho	Bird seller	
2003	Aisaa Kyon	Kaalu Khuta	
2004	Smile Please		
2004	Kkamjori: The Weakness		
2004	Aaj Jaana Hai Ke Pyaar Kya Ha		
2004	Plan	Atma (Film-maker)	
2004	Suno Sasurjee	Qutub Minar	
2004	Muskaan	Hotel Manager	
2004	Lakeer - Forbidden Lines	Javed	
2004	Bhola in Bollywood	Photographer	
2004	Aabra Ka Daabra	Spectator of Rahul's tricks	Uncredited
2005	Saathi: The Companion		
2005	Model: The Beauty		
2005	Mahiya: Call of Love		
2005	Chatri Ke Neeche Aaja		
2005	Chalta Hai Yaar	Junna Bhai Hatela	
2005	Be Parda		
2005	Khullam Khulla Pyaar Karen	Goverdhan's Brother-in-law	
2005	Kyaa Kool Hai Hum	Popat (Laundry wala)	
2005	No Entry	Johny Toteywala	
2005	Raja Bhai Lagey Raho...	Anarkali	
2005	Dubai Return	Khilji Bhai	
2005	Mr Prime Minister		
2005	Ho Jaata Hai Pyaar	Rajesh's assistant	
2006	Bipasha: The Black Beauty		
2006	Mere Jeevan Saathi	Tarzan	
2006	Chand Ke Paar Chalo	Mulla	
2006	Phir Hera Pheri	Kabira's gang member	
2006	Ladies Tailor	MKP	
2006	We R Friends		
2006	Hota Hai Dil Pyaar Mein Paagal		
2006	Jaana... Let's Fall in Love	Tip Kaka	
2006	Bhagam Bhag	Haaka	
2007	I'm in Love	Comedian	
2007	Panga Naa Lo		
2007	Fool & Final	Santa	
2007	Old Iss Gold		
2007	Jahan Jaaeyega Hamen Paaeyega	Babu Karela	
2007	Partner	John uncle	
2007	Salaam Bacche	Makhan Singh	
2007	Aadab Hyderabad	Kiraak Pasha Palan	
2008	Rama Rama Kya Hai Dramaa?	Abdul	
2008	Dhoom Dhadaka	Vasuli Network	
2008	Thoda Pyaar Thoda Magic	Pappu - Talwar's butler	
2008	Mehbooba		
2008	Gumnaam – The Mystery	Lucky	
2009	Chal Chala Chal	Basantilal (bus driver)	
2009	Dhoondte Reh Jaoge	Usman Kujli - Prison Inmate	
2009	Ek Se Bure Do	Mammu	
2009	Tera Kya Hoga Johnny		
2009	Saluun	Gajju	
2009	The Hero – Abhimanyu	Majnu Kabadi	
2010	Pyaar Kaa Fundaa		
2010	Prem Kaa Game	Lalwani	
2010	Kushti	Chander's friend	
2011	Masti Express	Salim	
2011	Bin Bulaye Baraati	Masterji	
2011	Loot	Razak Lala's man	
2012	Life Ki Toh Lag Gayi	Prince Ratan Tanshukia	
2012	Daal Mein Kuch Kaala Hai		
2012	Kyaa Super Kool Hai Hum	Popat (wala)	
2012	The Victim	Bus Conductor	Konkani theatrical film
2012	Kamaal Dhamaal Malamaal	Pedro	
2012	Ata Pata Laapata		
2012	It's Rocking: Dard-E-Disco	Muscle Bhai	
2013	Bin Phere Free Me Tere		
2013	Baat Bann Gayi	Carlos Rehbar Pasha	
2014	Marriage Da Garriage	Comedian	
2014	Munna Mange Memsaab		
2014	Hawaa Hawaai-Kucch Sapne Sone Nahi Detey	Garage Mechanic	
2014	Sulemani Keeda	Sweety Kapoor	
2014	Action Jackson	Xavier Fonseca Henchman	
2015	Choron Ki Baraat		
2015	Hogaya Dimaagh Ka Dahi	Teeli Bhai	
2016	Kyaa Kool Hain Hum 3	Popat (wala)	
2017	Masti Nahi Sasti	Banney Khan	
2017	Ye Hai Gaddar Dil	Villain	
2017	Sallu ki Shaadi		
2017	For Bindiya Call Jugnu	Sikander	
2018	WELCOME M1LL10NS	Break Bones aka Brian Rodrigues (Taxi Driver)	
2019	Upeksha		
2020	Ghoomketu	Sailu Nai	Released on ZEE5

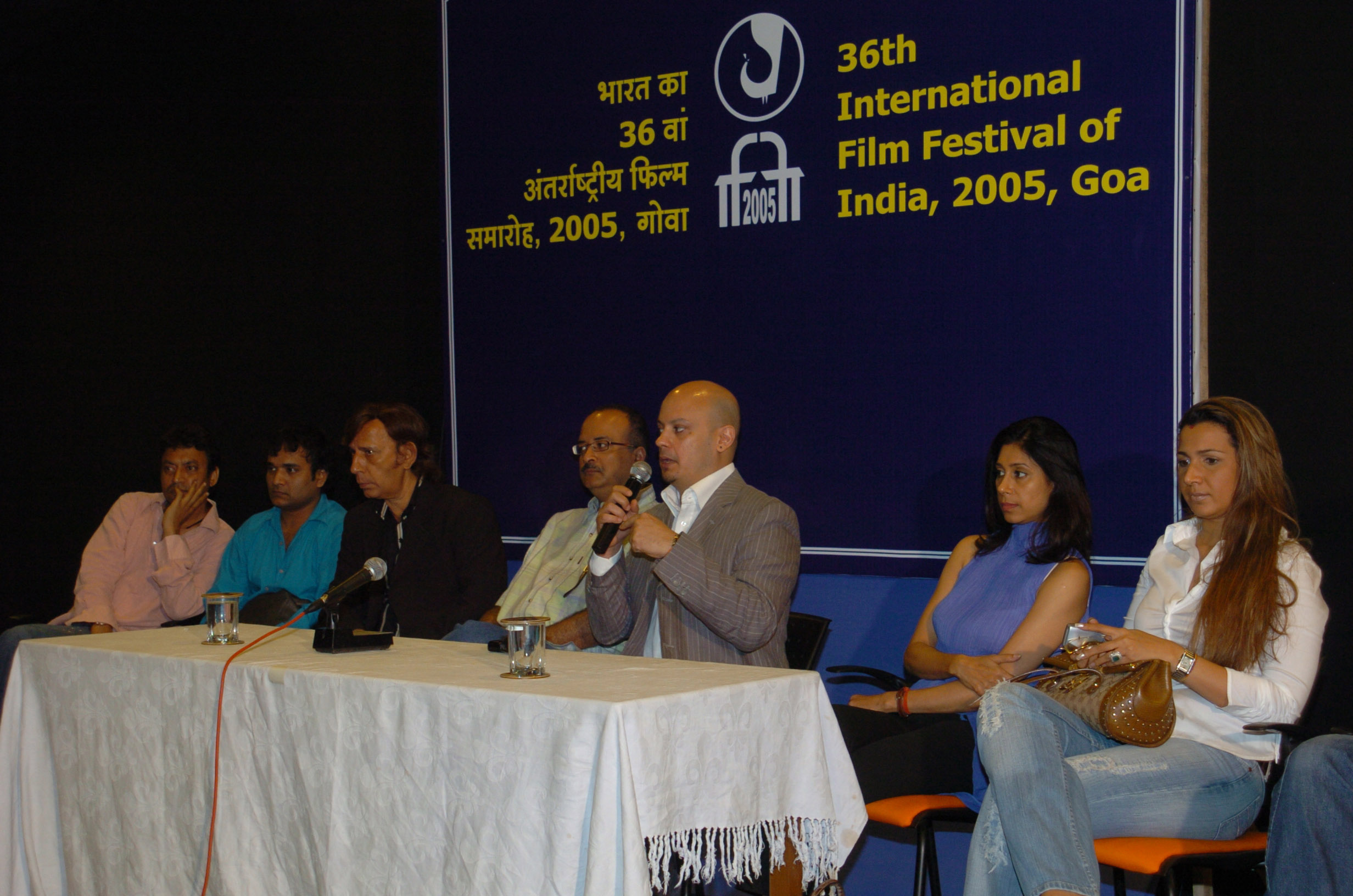
Razak Khan (third from left), IFFI (2005)

=== Television ===
- 1993 – Naya Nukkad as Ulhas Bhai
- 1996 – Zamana Badal Gaya
- 1997 – Chamatkar as Makodi Pahalwan
- 1997 – Filmi Chakkar as Pappu Kangi
- 2012 – RK Laxman Ki Duniya in a cameo role
- 2014 – Comedy Nights with Kapil as Golden Bhai
