= Joginder =

Indian actor (1949-2009)

- Born: Joginder Shelly; 4 July 1949
- Died: 15 June 2009 (aged 59); Mumbai, Maharashtra, India
- Occupations: Actor, producer, director

Joginder (real name Joginder Shelly) was an Indian actor, director, producer, writer, singer, songwriter and distributor. Two Hindi films produced, directed, written, acted and distributed by him were "Super Hits" – Bindiya Aur Bandook and Ranga Khush. (In Indian cinema any film which runs for over 50 weeks continuously is classified as a "Super Hit.")

The film Ranga Khush was a spinoff from Joginder's two-word dialogue in Bindiya aur Bandook (known internationally as "The girl with the gun"). He died from kidney and liver problems on June 15, 2009 in Mumbai at age 59.

== Career ==
Joginder was often placed on lists of "worst movie directors", a fan-generated title he shared with Ed Wood. In common with Wood, Joginder made a run of cheap and poorly produced films, now humorously celebrated for their unsophisticated special effects, large amounts of ill-fitting stock footage, idiosyncratic dialogue, eccentric casts and outlandish plot elements, although his flair for showmanship gave his projects at least a modicum of commercial success.

His commercial acumen came to the fore when he dared to release his houseful sequel Bindiya aur Bandook-2 against J.P. Dutta's megabudget LOC which flopped. The popular song "Main Hoon Botal Band Sharab" had audiences dancing in the aisles whenever it came on the screen.

Joginder acknowledged that he had no plans to enter mainstream cinema. His "Jhuggie-Jhopdi" (slum) audiences gave him fame and success.

Joginder's film Ranga Khush was repeatedly featured in debates in India's upper house of Parliament, the Rajya Sabha, for its extended rape sequences and insults to religious deities of all faiths.

Like Aamir Khan and Guru Dutt, he was often shy in claiming directorial credit for his hit films which were usually attributed to industry veteran Shibu Mitra.

A trained pilot, he also worked with the late Prime Minister Indira Gandhi before turning actor.

== Filmography ==
- Mitti Ke Rang

TV Serial for (Doordarshan) 15 Episodes

- Duplicate Sholay (2002)
- Khooni Tantrik (2001)
- Junglee Tarzan (2001)
- Daku Maharani (2000)
- Daku Ganga Jamuna (2000)
- Daku Ramkali (2000)
- Daaku Dilruba (2000)
- Bhai Thakur (2000)
- Meri Jung Ka Elaan (2000)
- The Revenge: Geeta Mera Naam (2000)
- Door Nahin Nankana (1999) Punjabi Movie
- Munnibai (1999)
- Khoonkar Darinde (1999)
- Mehndi (film) (1998)
- Yes Boss (1997)
- Auzaar (1997)
- Aatank Hi Aatank (1995)
- Jai Vikraanta (1995)
- Aag Aur Chingari (1994)
- Gangster (1994)
- Ganga Aur Ranga (1994)
- Aaj Kie Aurat (1993)
- Insaniyat Ke Devta (1993)
- King Uncle (1993)
- Rani Aur Maharani (1993)
- Tyagi (1992)
- Police Aur Mujrim (1992)
- Ganga Bani Shola (1992)
- Kaun Kare Kurbanie (1991)
- Dushman Devta (1991)
- Aag Aur Toofan (1991)
- Numbri Aadmi (1991)
- Hatim Tai (1990)
- Agneekaal (1990)
- Naaka Bandi (1990)
- Shehzaade (1989)
- Elaan-E-Jung (1989)
- Ghar Ka Chiraag (1989)
- Paanch Fauladi (1988)
- Jungle Ki Beti (1988)
- Hukumat (1987)
- Loha (1987)
- Daku Hasina (1987)
- Jaago Hua Savera (1987)
- Aadamkhor (1985)
- Mard (1985)
- Pyasa Shaitan (1984)
- Betaab (1983)
- Badle Ki Aag (1982)
- Kasam Durga Ki (1982)
- Bakhe Kadam (1980)
- Do Shikaari (1979)
- Guru Manio Granth (1977) Punjabi Movie
- Bhola Bhala (1978)
- Saawan Ke Geet (1978)
- Pandit Aur Pathan (1977)
- Aadmi Sadak Ka (1977)
- Amaanat (1977)
- Fauji (1976) Punjabi Movie
- Warrant (1975)
- Dhoti Lota Aur Chowpatty (1975)
- Ranga Khush (1975)
- Patthar Aur Payal (1974)
- Do Chattane Doodh Ke (1974)
- Chowkidar (1974)
- Thokar (1974)
- Mehmaan (1973)
- Hungama (1971 film) (1971)
- Heer Raanjha (1970)
- Bachpan (1970)
- Purab Aur Paschim (1970)
- Hum Hindustani (1960)
