= Ganga Bani Shola =

Hindi action film

Ganga Bani Shola is a Hindi action film of Bollywood directed by Kanti Shah, produced by P. L Ahuja and Yogesh Trivedi. This film was released on 3 July 1992 under the banner of Ambika Films.

== Plot ==
This is a revenge story of a lady named Ganga who turned into dacoit. Incidentally, her sister becomes a police officer.

== Cast ==
- Anupam Kher as Chamanlal
- Shakti Kapoor as Kamlesh Singh
- Dalip Tahil as Daku Yodha Singh
- Kader Khan as Insp Shekhar Kadam
- Kiran Kumar as Gorakh Nath
- Vijay Saxena as Manilal
- Goga Kapoor as Insp Arjun
- Joginder as Daku Hakim Singh
- Firoz Irani as Harish
- Arun Mathur as Police Commissioner Raghuveer
- Jamuna as Ganga
- Sripradha as Inspector Alka
- Nandita Thakur as Indumati

== Songs ==
1. "Hum Banjare Pyar Ke Maare" - Sadhana Sargam
2. "Ke Wadiya Bajana Balam Dheere Dheere" - Anupama Deshpande
3. "Mere Sajanwa" - Kavita Krishnamurthy
4. "Parody (Ganga Bani Shola)" - Sudesh Bhosle
5. "Sajna Maine Tum Ko Dil Diya" - Alka Yagnik
