= Purani Kabar =

- Directed by: K. I. Seikh
- Produced by: M. Kartik
- Starring: Mohan Joshi; Harish Patel; Jack Gaud; Poonam Dasgupta; Kiran Kumar
- Music by: Isfaq
- Production company: Heena Films
- Release date: 1 January 1998
- Running time: 118 min
- Language: Hindi

Purani Kabar is a Hindi horror film of Bollywood directed by K.I. Seikh and produced by M. Kartik. This movie was released in 1998 under the banner of Heena Films.

== Plot ==
Four friends of different religions buy lottery ticket for each. The seller sells the last ticket to their fifth friend and after the lucky draw the fifth friend wins the money. The other four claim that they should have an equal share in that prize. The winning friend refuses to give share, they kill him and steal the ticket money. When the wife of the deceased friend charges them they also drive her away. Years later deceased son grows up and become a police officer and knows about the murder of his father.

== Cast ==
- Mohan Joshi
- Jack Gaud as Demon
- Harish Patel
- Kiran Kumar
- Poonam Dasgupta
- Jyothi Rana
- Vinod Tripathi as dance master
- Kirti Shetty as Lalita
- Rajeev Raj as Inspector Vishal
- Mohini as Madhu
- Jayant Patekar
- Johny Nirmal as Dancer
- Firdaus Mewawala as Kanu

== Soundtrack ==
Purani Kabar

Soundtrack album by Isfaquel
- Released: September 1997
- Genre: Feature film soundtrack
- Length: 24:19
- Label: Love Audio

The music soundtrack of Purani Kabar was composed by Isfaquel with lyrics penned by Vishu Raj. Assam heartthrob-singer Zubeen Garg made his playback singing debut where he sang two Hindi songs, "Kuch To Kaho" and "Dil Mein Churaya Ek Hasina". Bollywood pop singer and actress Sagarika (sister of Shaan) was supposed to sing in the film but opted out for unknown reason.

=== Tracklist ===
Purani Kabar (Original Motion Picture Soundtrack)
No.	Title	Singer(s)	Length
1.	"Kuch To Kaho"	Zubeen Garg	4:54
2.	"Yeh Mera Dil Tere Liye"	Irfan Kumar, Chandana Dixit	4:32
3.	"Chuui Muee"	Chandana Dixit	3:55
4.	"Dil Mein Ek Bijali Se"	Jojo, Chandana Dixit	4:12
5.	"Dil Mein Churaya Ek Hasina"	Zubeen Garg, Chandana Dixit	5:12
6.	"Additional Attraction Song"		2:54
Total length:			24:19
