= Kafan =

- Directed by: Dhirendra Bohra
- Written by: Suri
- Produced by: Virendra Bohra
- Starring: Raza Murad; Johnny Lever; Rajesh Vivek; Viju Khote
- Cinematography: A. Latif
- Edited by: Hussain A. Burmawala
- Music by: Anand–Milind
- Distributed by: Roop Combine
- Release date: 1 August 1990
- Running time: 147 minutes
- Country: India
- Language: Hindi

Kafan is a 1990 Hindi horror film of Bollywood directed by Dhirendra Bohra. This film was released on 1 August 1990 under the banner of Roop Combine Production company.

== Plot ==
Four friends want to be immortal by way of supernatural power, and they ask for this from Tantrik (a black magician). The tantrik tells them to bring a virgin girl for rituals. Two of them find one girl, but they rape her until she faints and take her to the Tantrik. While the ritual starts, the girl transforms into an evil soul and enters the body of another girl. She kills the Tantrik first and starts killing the friends.

== Cast ==
- Javed Khan
- Raza Murad
- Viju Khote
- Johnny Lever
- Mac Mohan
- Rajesh Vivek
- Tina Ghai
- Huma Khan
- Jamuna

== Music ==
1. " Yeh Tune Nahi Maine Nahi Jaana" - Udit Narayan, Alka Yagnik
2. "Zindagi Ka Kya Bharosa" - Sapna Mukherjee
