= Ganga Aur Ranga =

- Directed by: Joginder
- Music by: Sonik-Omi
- Production company: Jet Speed Movie Makers
- Release date: 1 July 1994
- Country: India
- Language: Hindi

Ganga Aur Ranga (Hindi: गंगा और रंगा) is a 1994 Bollywood action film directed by Joginder and starring Kiran Kumar, Joginder and Shakti Kapoor. The film was released on 1 July 1994 under the banner of Jet Speed Movie Makers.

== Story ==
Thakur Dhanpath lives a wealthy lifestyle in a small village in India along with his wife, two daughters, and two sons. One of his sons is a hunchback named Ranga (Joginder Shelly). Dhanpath also has a younger brother, Narpath (Suresh Chatwal), both they do not get along, so much so that Narpath takes over the estate and throws Dhanpath and his family out of the house. Forced to live in destitution, Dhanpath encourages the village folks to speak out against Narpath's oppression.

== cast ==
- Kiran Kumar as Police Commissioner Gorakh
- Shakti Kapoor as Jagraj
- Joginder as Ranga
- Sahila Chadha as Ganga
- Suresh Chatwal as Thakur Narpath
- Anil Kochar as Harnam
- Huma Khan as Anuja

== Soundtrack ==
#	Song title	Singer(s)
1	"Ek Din Aisa"	Asha Bhosle
2	"Ghoonghroo Toot Gaye"	Asha Bhosle
3	"Idhar Bhi Allah"	Mohammed Aziz
4	"Tu Jhootha Teri Kasmein Jhoothi"	Asha Bhosle
5	"Yaar Manaoon"	Asha Bhosle
