= Hiraasat =

- Promotional Poster
- Directed by: Surendra Mohan
- Produced by: Sunil Sharma
- Starring: Shatrughan Sinha; Hema Malini; Mithun Chakraborty; Anita Raj
- Music by: Kalyanji-Anandji
- Release date: 10 July 1987
- Running time: 140 minutes
- Country: India
- Language: Hindi

Hiraasat is a 1987 Indian Hindi-language action film directed by Surendra Mohan, The film stars Shatrughan Sinha, Hema Malini, Mithun Chakraborty, Anita Raj.

== Plot ==
Assistant Commissioner of Police Ashok Saxena lives a middle-classed lifestyle along with his wife, Shobha, a former street dancer and a younger college-going brother, Rajesh. His father was also a police officer and he wanted Rajesh to become a police officer. He is honest to a fault but ends up getting arrested for drug-trafficking and suspects that Rajesh has taken to a life of crime in order to satisfy the wealthy father of his sweetheart Renu.

== Cast ==
- Shatrughan Sinha as ACP Ashok Saxena
- Hema Malini as Shobha Saxena
- Mithun Chakraborty as Rajesh Saxena "Raju"
- Anita Raj as Renu
- Prem Chopra as Dhanraj Patwardhan
- Shakti Kapoor as Sippy
- Dalip Tahil as Shyam
- Sujit Kumar as Vikas, Renu's Father
- Chandrashekhar as Police Commissioner R.K. Tandon
- Poonam Dasgupta as CBI Officer Sushma
- Kalpana Iyer as Dancer
- Jayshree T. as Dancer
- Bob Christo as Bob
- Chandrakant Gokhale as Narayan Rao
- Kamal Kapoor as Tom
- Huma Khan as Mrs. Patwardhan
- Amrit Pal as Shekhar, Rajesh's Boss
- Meenal Patel as Renu's Mother
- Nilu Phule as Dhirubhai
- Vandana Rane as Disha
- Gurbachan Singh as Rana

== Songs ==
Lyrics: Vishweshwar Sharma

| Song | Singer |
|---|---|
| "Yeh Duniya Ek Hiraasat" | Mohammed Aziz |
| "Aage Aage Woh Chale" | Kishore Kumar |
| "Har Aadmi Ko Biwi Ka Ghulam Hona Chahiye" | Kishore Kumar, Alka Yagnik |
| "Baaton Se Baat Na Banegi" | Kishore Kumar, Asha Bhosle |
| "Main Hoon Albeli" | Asha Bhosle |
| "Makhmali Badan" | Asha Bhosle |
