= Agneekaal =

- Theatrical release poster
- Directed by: Abbas–Mustan
- Written by: Naeem-Ejaz (dialogues); Shyam Raj (lyrics)
- Story by: Ranjit Herma
- Produced by: Ranjit Herma
- Starring: Jeetendra; Raj Babbar; Madhavi; Aasif Sheikh; Sonu Walia
- Cinematography: Randev Bhaduri
- Edited by: Hussain A. Burmawala
- Music by: Pankaj Bhatt
- Production company: Siddharth Pictures
- Release date: 19 October 1990
- Running time: 162 minutes
- Country: India
- Language: Hindi

Agneekaal is a 1990 Indian Hindi-language political film, produced by Ranjit Herma under the Siddharth Pictures banner, directed by Abbas–Mustan. It stars Jeetendra, Raj Babbar, Madhavi, Aasif Sheikh, Sonu Walia, Tinu Anand, Kiran Kumar, and Sadashiv Amrapurkar in the pivotal roles, with music composed by Pankaj Bhatt. It is the debut Hindi film for director duo Abbas–Mustan. They had made Gujarati movies previously.

== Plot ==
Bharat Nagar is a city in modern secular India that is terrorized by a gangster named Bhika, who is protected by the local politician, Gulabchand Jhakotia, his son, police inspector Bhushan, and the DSP Anand Saxena. When Inspector Gurdayal Singh accumulates enough evidence to arrest Bhika, he is killed. Bhushan then attempts to molest an activist, Bharati, but is stopped by Vijay, her fiancé. Bhushan kills Vijay and ends up getting killed by Bharati. The police arrest Bharati and hold her in a cell without permitting her to meet with anyone, including her brother, Aadesh. Bhushan's position is filled by SP Jagdishan, who attempts to bring law and order to this troubled city and even permits Aadesh to meet Bharati. When Bhika kills the owner of the local newspaper "Bharat Nagar Times," Jagdishan arrests him after D'Souza's daughter, Mary, comes forward to testify - only to get instructions for his transfer to distant Malegaon, and the immediate release of Bhika - who, together with Gulabchand, are now set to rule over Bharat Nagar - with no one bold enough to stand in their way.

It is loosely based on the prominent police officer Zanjeerwala Jhala (M.M. Jhala) from Gujarat, who was famous all over India for his heroism.

== Cast ==
- Jeetendra as Vijay
- Raj Babbar as SP Jagdishan "Zanjeerwala"
- Madhavi as Bharati
- Aasif Sheikh as Aadesh
- Sonu Walia as Mary D'Souza
- Tinu Anand as Mr. D'Souza
- Kiran Kumar as DSP Anand Saxena
- Sadashiv Amrapurkar as Gulabchand Jhakotia
- Joginder as Bhika
- Razzak Khan as Janta
- Amrit Patel as Constable Vasantrao Dhole

== Soundtrack ==
Lyrics: Shyam Raj

Song	Singer
"Tune Diya Hai"	Mohammed Aziz
"Mangti Hoon Sajan Bas Ek Baar"	Mohammed Aziz, Anuradha Paudwal
"Pankhida O Pankhida"	Asha Bhosle, Udit Narayan
"Zameen Aur Aasman"	Kumar Sanu
"Dil Ka Vote Doongi"	Alisha Chinoy
