= Phoolan Hasina Ramkali =

- Directed by: Kanti Shah
- Written by: Bashir Babar
- Screenplay by: Kanti Shah
- Produced by: Kanti Shah
- Starring: Shakti Kapoor; Raza Murad; Avtar Gill; Sudha Chandran; Anupam Kher; Kiran Kumar
- Cinematography: Vinod Barot
- Edited by: Sudhakar Naik
- Music by: Dilip Sen–Sameer Sen
- Production company: Mangla Films
- Release date: 29 January 1993
- Running time: 117 minutes
- Country: India
- Language: Hindi

Phoolan Hasina Ramkali is a 1993 Indian Hindi-language exploitation film, directed and produced by Kanti Shah. This movie was released under the banner of Mangla Films on 29 January 1993.

== Plot ==
The story based on the life of three lady dacoits, namely Phoolan, Hasina and Ramkali. The movie starts with action of Police officer Arjun Singh, who is honest and brave of heart. Arjun arrests infamous Dacoit Kundan Singh after a sudden fight. Police constable Bahadur was injured in this encounter, but Arjun succeeded in capturing Kundan. By the help of corrupt cop Ajit, Kundan fled from the lockup and attacked Arjun's house. Arjun was killed by Kundan. Arjun's friend Inspector Badshah Khan promises that he will take revenge of this murder one day. Years later, a village girl Phoolan helps the lady police inspector Hasina to arrest one illegal arms supplier. The main arms dealer or kingpin of crime sent his goon Vikhu to kidnap Phoolan. Actually, the kingpin is Kundan, who takes the new name, Thakur Saheb. Thakur rapes Phoolan, but police officer Ajit does not take any action against the offender. Although Inspector Hasina arrests Vikhu, Ajit fabricate a false murder case against Hasina and send her into the jail. Phoolan kills two henchmen of Thakur, runs out from the area and also makes her own gang of dacoits. On another occasion, Ramkali, daughter of deceased Arjun Singh is forcefully sent into a brothel. She kills the lady brothel keeper and joins with Phoolan and Hasina. These three victimized ladies start to take revenge against their respective oppressors.

== Cast ==
- Shakti Kapoor as Bahadur
- Sudha Chandran as Phoolan
- Sadashiv Amrapurkar as Bandit Kundan Singh
- Anupam Kher as Police Inspector Arjun Singh
- Kiran Kumar as Badshah Khan
- Raza Murad as Inspector Ajit
- Avtar Gill as Badrinath
- Kishore Bhanushali as Dev Anand (Duplicate)
- Vijay Saxena as Sundar
- Rajesh Vivek as Chaturdas
- Firoz Irani
- Kirti Singh as Hasina
- Aparajita

== Soundtrack ==
The music of the film was composed by Dilip Sen–Sameer Sen.

No.	Title	Singer(s)	Length
1.	"Chori Chori Jab Yun Ho"	Kumar Sanu
