= Annarth =

- Theatrical release poster
- Directed by: Ravi Dewan
- Written by: Imtiaz Hussain
- Produced by: Ravi Dewan
- Starring: Sanjay Dutt; Sunil Shetty; Gautam Rode; Preeti Jhangiani
- Cinematography: Suresh Suvarna
- Edited by: Prashant-Vinod
- Music by: Anand Raj Anand
- Production company: Suryoday Productions
- Release date: 1 November 2002
- Running time: 154 minutes
- Country: India
- Language: Hindi

Annarth (transl. Disaster or Apathy) is a 2002 Hindi- language action-thriller film. The film stars Sanjay Dutt, Sunil Shetty, Ashutosh Rana and Preeti Jhangiani, as well as Tinnu Anand and Johnny Lever in supporting roles. The film also features the debut of Gautam Rode and the film also stars former cricketer of the Indian cricket team, Vinod Kambli.

== Plot ==
A gangster named Jai "Jimmy" is terrorising people in a bar until a young man comes out and fights him. The two continue to fight until they hug each other. The young man is revealed to be Jimmy's childhood friend, Sameer Deshmukh, who has returned to the city after completing his education from the Navy. At that time, they run into two police officers, whom Sameer shoots down before escaping.

Jimmy shows his allegiance to his elder brother, Raghav, who leads one of the dangerous crime gangs in Mumbai and is more powerful than Jimmy. Sameer and Jimmy go to their old town, where they meet Jimmy's younger sister, Preeti. Jimmy introduces Sameer and friend Bandya to Raghav, who accepts them into his gang. Sameer and Bandya are against Raghav's work, leading to tensions between them and Jimmy.

Sameer and Preeti fall in love and want to marry each other. Suddenly, Bandya is killed at Raghav's orders. Jimmy is heartbroken by Bandya's murder and is convinced that the boss of a rival mob gang named Afzal is responsible for it. Raghav reveals to Preeti that two police officers are thought to have been killed by Sameer. Having thought Sameer to be a nice man, Preeti is angry at him. Sameer then tells her that the police officers' deaths were actually staged; they're still alive because Sameer himself is an undercover police officer intending to infiltrate Raghav's gang and put an end to his illegal setup. Preeti, despite believing that, remains angry with him. Every day, Sameer follows Preeti until she warns him that she will tell Raghav about his identity if he continues doing it. Sameer confides in Iqbal Danger about Preeti not talking to him. Iqbal invites Preeti to his show, where he sings a song, causing Preeti and Sameer to reconcile.

Jimmy goes to a bar where some people start making fun of Bandya. Jimmy kills their boss, Usman Bhai, who is the brother-in-law of Afzal, a powerful don like Raghav. Dayal Bhai, who is the most powerful don above Afzal and Raghav, has them forget their rivalry and become friends. Jimmy tries to shoot Dayal and Afzal, but Raghav stops him from doing so. Later that night, Raghav calls Jimmy by his real name, Jai, which makes Jimmy happy. Sameer tries to tell Jimmy that Raghav killed Bandya, but Jimmy does not believe it.

Sameer is at Afghan Church, where Sameer is secretly informing the police department of Raghav's plans while Jimmy is outside the church meeting Raghav only to be betrayed by his own brother and killed. On Jimmy's cremation, Sameer convinces Iqbal to tell Raghav about his true identity as a police officer, so Raghav sends his men to find out about Sameer and kill him. They go to Preeti's house, where Preeti refuses to tell them about Sameer, and they beat her up in retaliation.

When Sameer comes back, Preeti tells him that she got beaten up by Raghav's men. Sameer informs her that Raghav killed Jimmy and tells her that he will finish Raghav. She encourages him to do so. The next day, Sameer and Iqbal go together, and they fight Raghav and Dayal. A huge battle with gunfire and explosions erupts, and finally, the losing Raghav and Dayal try to escape in a car, but Iqbal and Sameer catch up, and the film ends with Sameer and Iqbal killing Raghav and Dayal.

== Cast ==
- Sanjay Dutt as Iqbal Danger
- Suniel Shetty as Jai / Jimmy
- Gautam Rode as Inspector Sameer Deshmukh
- Preeti Jhangiani as Preeti, Jimmy's sister.
- Ashutosh Rana as Raghav Bhai
- Tinnu Anand as Dayal Bhai (special appearance)
- Johnny Lever as Ben Bose
- Vinod Kambli as Bandya
- Shweta Menon as Khatun (special appearance)
- Razak Khan as Ulhas Bhai

== Soundtrack ==
All songs are written by Dev Kohli.

#	Title	Singer(s)
1	"Ankhiyan Na Mila"	Sukhwinder Singh, Jaspinder Narula
2	"Aashiq Tera"	Anand Raj Anand
3	"Bewafa Bar Mein"	Adnan Sami, Preeti & Pinky
4	"Dil Hai Deewana"	Vinod Rathod, Pamela Jain
5	"Diwana Dil"	Sunidhi Chauhan
6	"Whisky Pila De"	Abhijeet, Anand Raj Anand, Sadhana Sargam

== Reception ==
Taran Adarsh of IndiaFM gave the film 1.5 stars out of 5, writing ″On the whole, ANNARTH relies too heavily on an age-old formula, thus limiting its prospects.″
