= Aalasyam =

- Directed by: P. Chandrakumar
- Produced by: T. K. Balachandran
- Starring: P. Sukumar (Kiran); Poonam Dasgupta
- Music by: A. T. Ummer
- Production company: Teakebees
- Distributed by: Teakebees
- Release date: 1990
- Country: India
- Language: Malayalam

Aalasyam is a 1990 Indian Malayalam film, directed by P. Chandrakumar and produced by T. K. Balachandran. The film stars P.Sukumar (Kiran) and Poonam Dasgupta in the lead roles. The film has musical score by A. T. Ummer.

== Cast ==
- P. Sukumar (Kiran)
- Poonam Dasgupta

== Soundtrack ==
The music was composed by A. T. Ummer and the lyrics were written by Poovachal Khader.

No.	Song	Singers	Lyrics	Length (m:ss)
1	"Etho Pranayamanthram"	K. J. Yesudas	Poovachal Khader	
2	"Vikaara Sarassin"	Vani Jairam, Chorus	Poovachal Khader	
