= Aranyadalli Abhimanyu =

- VCD cover
- Directed by: H. R. Bhargava
- Written by: Kunigal Nagabhushan
- Screenplay by: H. R. Bhargava
- Story by: Lalladevi
- Produced by: S P Rajashekar
- Starring: Ambareesh; Poonam Dasgupta; Devaraj; Doddanna; Anjali Sudhakar
- Cinematography: R Madhusudan
- Edited by: B Nagesh
- Music by: Laxmikant–Pyarelal
- Production company: Sri Vasu Chithra
- Distributed by: Sri Vasu Chithra
- Release date: 13 September 1991
- Running time: 146 min
- Country: India
- Language: Kannada

Aranyadalli Abhimanyu is a 1991 Indian Kannada film, directed by H. R. Bhargava and produced by S P Rajashekar. The film stars Ambareesh, Poonam Dasgupta, Devaraj and Doddanna. The film has a musical score by Laxmikant–Pyarelal.

== Cast ==
- Ambareesh
- Poonam Dasgupta
- Devaraj
- Doddanna
- Jaggesh
- Syed
- Rajanand
- Ramesh Bhat
- Mysore Lokesh
- Sihikahi Chandru
- Tennis Krishna
- Shani Mahadevappa
- Anjali Sudhakar
- Kamalashree
