= Bindiya Aur Bandook =

1972 film

- Directed by: Shibu Mitra
- Produced by: Joginder
- Starring: See below
- Release date: 1972
- Country: India
- Language: Hindi

Bindiya Aur Bandook is a Hindi action drama movie of Bollywood, directed by Shibu Mitra and produced by Joginder. This film was released in 1972 under the banner of Apollo International.

== Cast ==
- Kiran Kumar as Shankar
- Asha Sachdev as Durga
- Raza Murad as Karan Singh
- Laxmi Chhaya
- Joginder
- Tun Tun
- Keshto Mukherjee
- Rajan Haksar
- Helen as Courtesan

== Soundtrack ==
All songs were written by Gulshan Bawra.

- "Chhori Loot Gayi Re, Tere Liye Sajna" - Asha Bhosle
- "Kela Aane Aane" - Asha Bhosle
- "Bindiya Lagaungi" - Asha Bhosle
- "Najariya Jhuka Ke" - Asha Bhosle
- "Title Music"
