= Duplicate Sholay =

- Directed by: Kanti Shah
- Written by: Bashir Babbar
- Produced by: Kanti Shah
- Production company: Pali Films
- Release date: 26 April 2002
- Running time: 147 minutes
- Country: India
- Language: Hindi

Duplicate Sholay is a 2002 spoof Hindi drama film that parodies the 1975 film Sholay. It was directed by Kanti Shah and released on 26 April 2002.

== Cast ==
- Sapna as Ram Katori
- Joginder as Sakina
- Arun Mathur as Police Commissioner Ram Singh
- Anil Nagrath as Ajit Singh
- Amit Pachori as Jay / Shahenshah
- Gurbachchan Singh as Gurubachan
- Jai Thakur as Jay Thakur
- Vinod Tripathi as Gabbar Singh
- Feroz
- Dhananjay Singh
