= Krishna Tere Desh Main =

Krishna Tere Desh Mein
- Directed by: Shiv Kumar
- Produced by: Shiv Kumar
- Starring: Ashok Sharma; Chetan; Dev Sharma; Raza Murad; Shiv Kumar
- Release date: 2000
- Country: India
- Language: Hindi

Krishna Tere Desh Main is a 2000 film produced and directed by Shiv Kumar. Music by Ravindra Jain.

== Cast ==
- Ashok Sharma
- Chetan
- Dev Sharma
- Asrani
- Johny Lever
- Manek Pramanik
- Raza Murad
- Poonam Dasgupta
- Raju Shrivastav
- Upasana Singh
- Ramesh Goyal
- Renu Sharma
