= Khooni Tantrik =

2001 film by Teerat Singh

- Directed by: Teerat Singh
- Produced by: Shagufta Arts productions
- Starring: Joginder, Deepak Shirke, Poonam Dasgupta, Shiva Rindani, Mahima Sahay, Vishal Bubna, Ena Chauhan, Ramesh Goyal, Sudha Kapoor
- Release date: 2001
- Country: India
- Language: Hindi

Khooni Tantrik (Murderous Tantric) is a Hindi horror film of Bollywood directed by Teerat Singh. This film was released in 2001 by Shagufta Arts productions.

== Plot ==
Rajan and Rajani are childless couple. Rajani always goes to temples and worshiped Tantrik in order to give birth. Her arrogant husband does not like such activities. One night Rajani goes to one powerful Tantrik, Bhaironath to seek his blessings, Rajan suspects her and kill Bhaironath thinking her wife has an illicit relation with that Tantrik. Bhootnath, the brother of Bhaironath take avenge of this. He kills Rajan and also curse Rajani to give birth a devil child. Consequently, an evil baby is born which become a demon and start killing people.

== Cast ==
- Joginder as Gobar Baba
- Deepak Shirke as Bhaironath/ Bhootnath
- Poonam Dasgupta as Rajani
- Shiva Rindani as Rajan
- Mahima Sahay as Seema
- Vishal Bubna as Vishal
- Ena Chauhan as Mahi
- Ramesh Goyal as Durjan Singh
- Sudha Kapoor
