= Daaku Dilruba =

- Directed by: William Hant
- Produced by: J. Neelam
- Starring: Mohan Joshi, Raza Murad, Kiran Kumar, Joginder
- Production company: Deep Jyoti Films
- Release date: 14 July 2000
- Country: India
- Language: Hindi

Daaku Dilruba is a Hindi action movie of Bollywood directed by William Hant and produced by J. Neelam. This movie was released on 14 July 2000 under the banner of Deep Jyoti Films.

== Plot ==
This is a revenge and love story of a village girl. The teenage girl is brutally raped by a few men of the village. She becomes the dacoit Daaku Dilruba and kills all the rapists.

== Cast ==
- Mohan Joshi as Thakur Jaagir Singh
- Raza Murad as Daku Vikram Singh
- Kiran Kumar as Daku Gorakh Singh
- Joginder as Hakim Singh
- Vinod Tripathi as Kundan
- Anil Nagrath as Tarachand
- Satnam Kaur as Daaku Dilruba
- Yamini as Daku Ramkali
- Arvind Jaiswal as Insp Arjun
- Shravani Goswami as Sarita
- Shakeel Shetty as Abhinav
- Gautham as Inspector Pradeep
