= Khooni Bistar =

Hindi-language horror film

Khooni Bistar is a Hindi horror fantasy film of Bollywood directed by Talak Raj and produced by Pradip Agarwal. This film was released on 18 January 2002 under the banner of Kumar Mangalam Films.

== Plot ==
An insane, bloodthirsty man entraps women, rapes and kills them. He repeats his crimes every night. The police try to find the man and catch him with evidences. They use the killer's girlfriend but cannot catch him. Suddenly the police discover a fact that is uncanny and horrible.

== Cast ==
- Raza Murad
- Kishore Bhanushali
- Rajeeb Raj
- Ali Khan
- Anil Nagrath
- Jay Kalgutkar
- Mahesh Raj
- Birbal
- Bobby Khan
- Noor Khan
- Mahendra Sharma
- Anmol
