= Pyasi Aatma =

Pyasi Atma
- DVD cover
- Directed by: P Chandrakumar
- Written by: Rajesh Berry
- Produced by: Gautam Dhariwal
- Starring: Prithvi; Shiva; Kishore Bhanushali; Dinesh Hingoo; Mithun Chakraborty
- Music by: Arvinder-Surender
- Release date: 18 December 1998
- Running time: 125 minutes
- Country: India
- Language: Hindi

Pyasi Atma is a 1998 Indian Hindi-language horror film directed by P Chandrakumar and produced by Gautam Dhariwal, starring Prithvi, Shiva, Kishore Bhanushali, Dinesh Hingoo and Mithun Chakraborty.

== Plot ==
Radha and Goppi have been engaged since childhood and are planning to get married. However, Radha dies in a fight with bandits while trying to save her beloved. Her soul cannot find peace until she avenges the ones who separated her from her beloved.

== Cast ==
- Mithun Chakraborty ( Guest Appearance )
- Shiva Rindani as Chandi Baba
- Prithvi as Police Inspector Gandhi
- Brahmachari
- Kishore Bhanushali
- Dolly Bindra as Radha
- Dinesh Hingoo as Abdut College Professor of Anatomy
- Jay Thakur as Rana
- Manvi Gowami as Swapna
- Rajesh Puri as Radha's uncle
- Raju Shrestha
- Nisha Sharma
- Rashmi Chopra
