= Preeti & Pinky =

Indipop duo singers

Preety & Pinky are Indipop duo singers. The sisters hail from a Gujarati family.

== Career ==
This duo had started singing at the ages of five and seven years old. They also sang for many Bollywood films. Besides Hindi, they sang in English, Malayalam, Gujarati, Sindhi, Marathi, and Bhojpuri. In addition to their popularity in India, they are also well known in United States, Canada and England.

== Filmography ==
Year	Film	Song name	Composer	Notes
2000	Har Dil Jo Pyar Karega	Piya Piya	Anu Malik	Nominated - Filmfare Award for Best Female Playback Singer; Nominated - IIFA Award for Best Female Playback
2001	Rehnaa Hai Terre Dil Mein	Churaya Churaya	Vishal–Shekhar	
2001	Mujhe Kucch Kehna Hai	Maine Koi Jadoo	Anu Malik	
2001	Aamdani Atthani Kharcha Rupaiyaa	Ta Thaiya Ta Thaiya	Himesh Reshammiya	Pinky only
2002	Annarth	Bewafa Bar Mein	Anand Raj Anand	
2002	Ab Ke Baras	Hoga Hoga	Anu Malik	
2002	Kuch Tum Kaho Kuch Hum Kahein	Chudi Chudi	Anu Malik	
2002	Dil Dhoondta Hai	Payal Ne Lehnge Se Kaha	Anu Malik	
2002	Badhaai Ho Badhaai	Jogan Jogan	Anu Malik	Kunal Ganjawala
2003	Chalte Chalte	Tujhpar Gagan Se	Aadesh Shrivastava	
2003	Rabba Re	Miss India	Anand–Milind	with Kailash Kher
2004	Smile Please	Smile Please; Babuji Zara Dil Pe	Devang Patel	
2013	Mumbai Mirror	Doom Pe Lakdi	Amjad Nadeem	
2013	Main Krishna Hoon	Main Krishna Hoon; Maa	Amjad Nadeem	

== Discography ==
Year	Album title	Composer	Notes
1999	Sur	Uttam Singh	Preeti only
1999	Jhoome Jahan	Sanjeev Srivastava	

== Awards ==
- 2001 - Nomination Filmfare Best Playback singer (Female) award for song "Piya Piya" From the Movie Har Dil Jo Pyaar Karega.
- 2001 - Nomination IIFA Award for Best Female Playback for song "Piya Piya" From the Movie Har Dil Jo Pyaar Karega.
