= Daku Hasina =

Indian 1987 action Film

- None
- Directed by: Ashok Rao
- Produced by: Rajiv Kaul
- Starring: Zeenat Aman; Rakesh Roshan; Roshini; Raza Murad; Joginder
- Music by: Usha Khanna
- Release date: 6 March 1987
- Running time: 140 minutes
- Country: India
- Language: Hindi

Daku Hasina is a 1987 Bollywood action film directed by Ashok Rao starring Zeenat Aman and Rakesh Roshan in lead roles, while Roshini, Raza Murad and Joginder played other pivotal roles. Rajinikanth made an extended special appearance in this film. The music is by Usha Khanna. The film was released on 3 April 1987.

== Plot ==
After the death of her parents, Roopa Saxena attempts to get justice, only to find that the killers have bought the law, and their influence gets them off. Roopa then turns for help to dacait Mangal Singh, and she transforms herself into Dacait Hasina, in order to avenge her parents' death.

She gives birth to a mute child. The police entrust the matter of apprehending Daku Hasina to SP Ranjit Saxena, without realizing that he is the brother of Daku Hasina, and may actually join her to avenge the death of his parents.

== Cast ==
- Zeenat Aman as Roopa Saxena / Daku Hasina
- Rakesh Roshan as SP Ranjit Saxena
- Roshini
- Raza Murad as Raja
- Joginder as Durjan
- Pradeep Kumar as Shamsher Singh
- Ramesh Deo as D.I.G.
- Roopesh Kumar as Rana
- C.S. Dubey as Lala
- Chandrashekhar as MLA
- Dinesh Hingoo as Munim
- Rajinikanth as Mangal Singh (special appearance)
- Vijay Arora as Somnath, Mangal Singh Brother (special appearance)
- Abhi Bhattacharya as School Master (special appearance)

== Soundtrack ==
#	Title	Singer(s)
1	"Ang Jale Gora Rang Jale"	Suresh Wadkar, Alka Yagnik
2	"Nagar Nagar Hai Taza Khabar"	Asha Bhosle
3	"Pyar Ke Mod Par"	Dilawar Babu, Parveen Saba
4	"Tu Pehle Kya Thi"	Bade Yusuf Azad
