= Kishore Bhanushali =

Indian actor

- Occupations: Actor; Comedian
- Years active: 1989–present

Kishore Bhanushali is an Indian actor and stand-up comedian known for his work in Hindi films and television serials. He is noted for his resemblance to the late Bollywood actor Dev Anand. Bhanushali has appeared in lead roles in films such as Hum Hain Khalnayak, Jai Maa Karwa Chauth, and Ramgarh Ke Sholay.

== Filmography ==
- Su Karisu (2016)
- Munna Mange Memsaab (2014)
- Daal Mein Kuch Kaala Hai (2012)
- Apartment (2010)
- Shortkut - The Con is On (2009)
- Khushboo (2008)
- Good Luck (2008)
- Mr. Hot Mr. Kool (2007)
- Kabhi Kranti Kabhi Jung (2004)
- Khakee (2004)
- Khanjar: The Knife (2003)
- Guru Mahaaguru (2002)
- Ang Se Ang Laga Le (2002)
- Pyaar Diwana Hota Hai (2002)
- Ittefaq (2001)
- Chehra Maut Ka (2001)
- Gumnam Qatil (2001)
- Khooni Bistar (2001)
- Qatil Haseeno Ka (2001)
- Maharaani (2001)
- The Case of the Hidden Sniper: Part 2 (2000)
- Glamour Girl (2000 film)|Glamour Girl (2000)
- Kharidaar (2000)
- Shikaar (2000)
- Rahasya (2000)
- Raat Ki Baat (2000)
- Kaala Mandir (2000)
- Bhoot Raaj (2000)
- Purnasatya (1999)
- Phool Aur Aag (1999)
- Bahke Kadam (1999)
- Jai Hind: The Pride (1999)
- Khooni Ilaaka: The Prohibited Area (1999)
- Bade Miyan Chote Miyan (1998)
- Aunty No. 1 (1998)
- Phir Wohi Awaaz (1998)
- Zulm-O-Sitam (1998)
- Gharwali Baharwali (1998)
- 2001: Do Hazaar Ek (1998)
- Hatyara (1998)
- Pyasi Aatma (1998)
- Daal Mein Kala (Telefilm) (1998)
- Police Station (1997)
- Mr. and Mrs. Khiladi (1997)
- Mahaanta
- Mohabbat (1997)
- Mafia
- Hum Hain Khalnayak (1996)
- Khiladiyon Ka Khiladi (1996)
- Hum Hai Premi (1996)
- Agnee Prem (1996)
- Vapsi Saajan Ki (1995)
- Anokha Andaaz (1995)
- Barsaat (1995)
- Dance Party (1995)
- Sabse Bada Khiladi (1995)
- Jawab (1995)
- Fauji (1995)
- Bewafa Sanam (1995)
- Karan Arjun (1995)
- Baali Umar Ko Salaam (1994)
- Sangdil Sanam (1994)
- Jai Maa Karwa Chauth (1994)
- Hanste Khelte (1994)
- Pathreela Raasta (1994)
- Gopi Kishan (1994)
- Hum Hain Kamaal Ke (1993)
- Aulad Ke Dushman (1993)
- Phoolan Hasina Ramkali (1993)
- Pyar Pyar (1993)
- Jaagruti (1993)
- Nishchaiy (1992)
- Zulm Ki Hukumat (1992)
- Paayal Kishore (1992)
- Yudhpath (1992)
- Dil Ka Kya Kasoor (1992)
- Swarg Yahan Narak Yahan (1991)
- Ramgarh Ke Sholay (1991)
- Karz Chukana Hai (1991)
- Baaghi: A Rebel for Love (1990)
- Dil (1990)
- Kasam Dhande Ki (1990)
- Lashkar (1989)

=== Television ===
- Andaz (TV series)
- Zimbo (1996)
- Daal Mein Kala (1998) as Coffee
- Kora Kagaz (1998)
- Truck Dhina Dhin
- Akhand Saubhagyavati
- C.I.D.
- Shaktimaan (2000) as Navrangi
- Idhar Kamaal Udhar Dhamaal (2003)
- Banda Yeh Bindaas Hai (TV Series) (2005)
- Resham Dankh (2006)
- Dekh India Dekh (2009) as Shakuni
- Entertainment Ke Liye Kuch Bhi Karega (2009) as participant (Winner)
- Lage Raho Chachu (2015) as Brave Anand
- Bhabi Ji Ghar Par Hai (2016–2025) as Police Commissioner Resham Pal Singh and Sharma Uncle(previously)
- Happu Ki Ultan Paltan (2019–2026) as Police Commissioner Resham Pal Singh
- Saat Phero Ki Hera Pherie (2018) as Baba Sevanand
