= Pathreela Raasta =

Pathreela Raasta पथरीला रास्ता
- Starring: Dimple Kapadia; Sadashiv Amrapurkar; Mukesh Khanna
- Distributed by: Padmavati Enterprises
- Release date: 1994
- Running time: 142 min
- Country: India
- Language: Hindi

Pathreela Raasta is a 1994 Indian Hindi-language action drama film directed by Ajay Kashyap, starring Dimple Kapadia, Varsha Usgaonkar, Sadashiv Amrapurkar and Mukesh Khanna in pivotal roles.

== Plot ==
The film revolves with underworld gang war between Gayatri and Tao.

== Cast ==
- Dimple Kapadia as Gayatri Sanyal
- Varsha Usgaonkar as Mona
- Sadashiv Amrapurkar as Ramakant Waghmare
- Mahesh Anand as Munna
- Mukesh Khanna as Inspector Arjun
- Divya Kumar as Inspector Pratap
- Raza Murad as Commissioner Saxena
- Reema Lagoo as Kamla
- Shagufta Ali as Anjali
- Poonam Dasgupta as Anuja
- Deep Dhillon as Jagraal
- Satyen Kappu as Ram Kumar
- Jack Gaud as Amarkant
- Bob Christo as Juda
- Mac Mohan as Hariprasad Srivastava
- Chandrashekhar as Judge Surinder
- Gajendra Chauhan as Yashwant
- Kishore Bhanushali as Ajay

== Music ==
1. "Kangna Pehna De Sajan Tere Naam Ka" – Alka Yagnik, Kumar Sanu
2. "Aag Laga Ke Chale Ho Kaha" – Kumar Sanu, Alka Yagnik
3. "Choli Aur Ghaghra Rang Daalo Na" – Kavita Krishnamurthy, Udit Narayan
4. "Mai Hu Tera Tu Hai Meri Jaanam" – Kumar Sanu, Alka Yagnik
5. "Sholo Me Shola Me" – Alisha Chinai, Sudesh Bhosle
6. "Aaj Naachte Hue Mar Jaana Hai" – Alka Yagnik
