= Daku Maharani =

- Directed by: Teerat Singh Johar
- Screenplay by: Prem Kumar Sharma
- Produced by: Vimal Jain
- Starring: Kiran Kumar; Deepak Shirke; Joginder; Shiva Rindani
- Music by: Sawan Kumar Sawan
- Production company: Nishu Art
- Release date: 17 November 2000
- Running time: 105 minutes
- Country: India
- Language: Hindi

Daku Maharani is a Hindi rape and revenge, dacoit film of Bollywood directed by Teerat Singh Johar and produced by Vimal Jain. This film was released in 2000 under the banner of Nishu Art.

== Plot ==
Maharani is a young woman who was brutally raped by village leader, Thakur. Thakur is a very powerful and influential person who stigmatised her as a fallen woman. Maharani was sent out of the village, but then she takes revenge against Thakur.

== Cast ==
- Kiran Kumar as Inspector Jagjit Singh
- Deepak Shirke as Cbatarhaudhari Jagawar
- Joginder as Sarpanch Hakim
- Shiva Rindani Thakur Balwant
- Ishrat Ali Lambu
- Kamal Malik as Shambhu
- Romesh Goel as Police Commissioner
- Satnam Kaur as Rani
- Anil Nagrath as Lala Roopchand
- Roma
