= Maar Dhaad =

Hindi film

Maar Dhaad is a 1988 Indian Hindi-language action film directed by Yesh Chauhaan and produced by Kanti Shah. The music was composed by Rajesh Roshan.

== Cast ==
- Navin Nischol as Navin Kumar Bhatija
- Hemant Birje as Shankar
- Mandakini (actress) as Neeta Bhatija
- Sadashiv Amrapurkar as Babulal/Dr D'Çruz
- Satish Shah
- Puneet Issar as Police Inspector Sangraam/Jaggu
- Shiva Rindani as Arun
- Manik Irani as Jojo
- Mohan Choti
- Raj Kishore as Property Lawyer of Bhatija
- Shail Chaturvedi as Public Prosecutor/Lawyer
- Huma Khan as Sheeba
- Seema Vaz

== Music ==
1. " Dream Boy" - Alisha Chinoy
2. "Michael Ke Adde Pe" - Sadhana Sargam
3. "Pagal Mann Mera" - Sadhana Sargam, Chandru Atma, Kumar Sanu
4. "Sun Le Haseena" - Sadhana Sargam, Nitin Mukesh
