= Chehra Maut Ka =

2001 film by Inder Kumar Gupta

Chehra Maut Ka चेहरा मौत का
- Directed by: Inder Kumar Gupta
- Screenplay by: A.K.Ahuja
- Produced by: N.C. Vasani
- Starring: Kiran Kumar; Mac Mohan; Kishore Bhanushali
- Music by: K.N.Jha
- Production company: Gee Vee Films Combine
- Release date: 28 September 2001
- Running time: 118 minutes
- Language: Hindi

Chehra Maut Ka is a Hindi horror film directed by Inder Kumar Gupta and produced by N.C. Vasani. This film was released on 28 September 2001 under the banner of Gee Vee Films Combine.

== Cast ==
- Kiran Kumar as Inspector Gorakh Singh
- Mac Mohan as Jagmohan
- Kishore Bhanushali Chakradhari
- Ghanashyam Nayak as Karodimal
- Mamta Singh as Sandhya
- Mahesh Raj as Inspector Santosh Mehta
- Rani Sinha as Anuja
- Birbal as Karan
- Prashant Jaiswal as Shaitan Singh
