= Ranga Khush =

- Directed by: Joginder
- Screenplay by: Joginder
- Story by: Joginder
- Produced by: Joginder
- Starring: Bharat Bhushan; Dheeraj Kumar; Aruna Irani; Nazima; Nazneen; Joginder; Chandrashekhar
- Music by: Sonik Omi
- Production company: Apollo International
- Release date: January 1975
- Country: India
- Language: Hindi

Ranga Khush is a Hindi action drama movie of Bollywood directed and produced by Joginder. This film was released in January, 1975 under the banner of Apollo International.

== Plot ==
Ranga, the bandit chief terrorises many villages and the police cannot catch him. A poor villager Sultan Singh lives with his son Karma and daughter Devi. Ranga kills Sultan and kidnaps Devi. Karma tries to organise the villagers against Ranga and his gang of dacoit to save his sister.

== Cast ==
- Bharat Bhushan as Dilip Singh
- Dheeraj Kumar as Karma
- Aruna Irani as Kasturi
- Nazima as Devi
- Nazneen as Reshma
- Joginder as Ranga
- Chandrashekhar as Police Inspector
- Vikram as Karma
- Rajan Haksar
- Som Dutta as Ratna
- Chandrima Bhadury as Ginnibai

== Soundtrack ==
The music direction of Ranga Khush was made by Sonik Omi and main playback singer was Asha Bhosle.
