= Har Dil Jo Pyar Karega =

2000 Indian film by Raj Kanwar

- Movie poster for Har Dil Jo Pyaar Karega
- Directed by: Raj Kanwar
- Written by: Rumi Jaffery
- Story by: Priyadarshan
- Based on: Chandralekha by Priyadarshan
- Produced by: Sajid Nadiadwala
- Starring: Salman Khan; Preity Zinta; Rani Mukerji; Paresh Rawal
- Cinematography: W. B. Rao
- Edited by: Sanjay Verma
- Music by: Songs: Anu Malik; Background Score: Surinder Sodhi
- Distributed by: Nadiadwala Grandson Entertainment
- Release date: 4 August 2000
- Running time: 150 minutes
- Country: India
- Language: Hindi
- Budget: ₹13 crore
- Box office: ₹32.45 crore

Har Dil Jo Pyar Karega (transl. Every heart that loves) is a 2000 Indian Hindi-language romantic comedy film directed by Raj Kanwar, produced by Sajid Nadiadwala, written by Rumi Jaffrey, and edited by Sanjay Verma. The film stars Salman Khan, Preity Zinta and Rani Mukerji in lead roles. The film is a remake of the Malayalam film Chandralekha (1997) which itself was inspired by the 1995 American film While You Were Sleeping.

Har Dil Jo Pyar Karega was the third consecutive hit between Khan and Nadiadwala's collaboration after Jeet (1996) and Judwaa (1997) as well as one of the year's top-earnings films with a gross of ₹965.5 million worldwide. The film entered the top 10 chart in the UK.

At the 46th Filmfare Awards, Har Dil Jo Pyar Karega received 2 nominations – Best Supporting Actress (Mukerji) and Best Female Playback Singer (Preeti & Pinky for "Piya Piya").

== Plot ==
Raj is a singer trying to make his way in the big city of Mumbai. He rescues a young woman who has fallen in front of a train and stays with her when she is rushed to a hospital. Pooja Oberoi, the daughter of a wealthy family, survives but falls into a coma. Her family rushes to the hospital and, finding Raj there, assumes that he is Pooja's husband, Romi, with whom she had eloped to marry and whom they had never met. Since Pooja's father has a higher chance of a heart attack, Raj lies and says he is Romi.

As the family gets to know the pretend Romi, Pooja's best friend, Jahnvi starts spending a lot of time with him. They both fall in love with each other, who is regarded as a second daughter by Pooja's family. Then Pooja revives from her coma and complicates matters by falling for Raj. In a conversation, Pooja and Jahnvi both reveal that they both love Raj using signs (hand up) but Jahnvi realises that Pooja loves Raj resulting in her putting her hand down. Raj and Jahnvi put their relationship to an end. On the day of their engagement, Jahnvi unknowingly takes Pooja's cell phone (her and Pooja's cellphone look the same). Knowing that Raj will never marry Pooja if she's there, she decides to leave. When Jahnvi's cell phone rings, Pooja picks it up and it ends up being Raj's best friend who pleads with Jahnvi to break this wedding and come back to Raj. Pooja then reveals to everyone about Raj and Jahnvi and Raj and Jahnvi are once reunited. Pooja chooses Rahul to marry her.

== Cast ==
- Salman Khan as Raj Sharma "Raju" / Romi
- Preity Zinta as Jahnvi Verma
- Rani Mukerji as Pooja Oberoi
- Rajeev Verma as Bharat Oberoi, Pooja's father.
- Paresh Rawal as Goverdhan Verma, Jahnvi's father.
- Neeraj Vora as Abdul
- Shakti Kapoor as Kamlesh, Abdul's uncle
- Satish Shah as Mahesh Hirwani
- Kamini Kaushal as Biji
- Vinay Pathak as Monty
- Razak Khan as Dance Mater Godbole
- Shahrukh Khan as Rahul Khanna (special appearance)
- Sana Saeed as Anjali Khanna (special appearance)
- Anu Malik as himself (special appearance)
- Sameer as himself (special appearance)

== Music ==
Har Dil Jo Pyar Karega

Soundtrack album by Anu Malik
- Released: 09 June 2000
- Recorded: 2000
- Genre: Feature film soundtrack
- Length: 44:22
- Label: T-Series
- Producer: Anu Malik

Anu Malik chronology
Refugee (2000)	Har Dil Jo Pyar Karega (2000)	Aaghaaz (2000)

The music of the film was composed by Anu Malik. According to the Indian trade website Box Office India, the film's soundtrack album sold 2.2 million units and was one of the highest-selling soundtracks of the year. "Har Dil Jo Pyar Karega", "Piya Piya", "Ek Garam Chai Ki Pyali Ho" and "Aisa Pehli Baar Hua Hai Satrah Athrah Saalon Mein" garnered special popularity, and the soundtrack album was positively received. Screen rated the soundtrack album number one for the third week of August 2000. As of 2020, fans are petitioning for all the songs to be on TikTok.

Interestingly, the movie featured a special appearance by Anu Malik and Sameer who were to compose Raj's album in the movie.

All tracks are written by Sameer.

Track-List
No.	Title	Singer(s)	Length
1.	"Har Dil Jo Pyar Karega"	Alka Yagnik, Udit Narayan	6:04
2.	"Dil Dil Deewana"	Alka Yagnik, Udit Narayan	5:55
3.	"Aisa Pehli Baar Hua Hai"	Sonu Nigam	6:47
4.	"Piya Piya"	Preeti & Pinky, Prashant	5:40
5.	"Ek Garam Chai Ki Pyali Ho"	Anu Malik	5:40
6.	"Sahiba Sahiba"	KK	2:42
7.	"Sahiba Sahiba" (Version 2)	KK	1:33
8.	"Aate Jaate Jo Milta Hai"	Alka Yagnik, Sonu Nigam	6:12
9.	"Har Dil Jo Pyar Karega" (Sad Version)	Alka Yagnik	3:49
10.	"Har Dil Jo Pyar Karega Woh Gaana Gaaye Ga" (Happy Version)	Udit Narayan, Kumar Sanu	3:49
Total length:			47:30

== Critical reception ==
The film was generally well received by the critics, with the performances of the three leads receiving particular praise.

Film journal Screen praised the performances of Khan and Zinta and wrote, "The director deserves to be commended for his efforts to spring a few surprises in the film and extract better performances from the lead players." Aparajita Saha of Rediff wrote that the film is "guaranteed to give audiences everywhere that mushy, gooey, everything-is-all-right-with-the-world sensation they crave." Vinayak Chakravorty of Hindustan Times praised Zinta and noted Kanwar for his "treatment is frothy in the romantic first half and sensibly balanced in the mushy second."

Dinesh Raheja of India Today wrote, "a fluorescent feel-good film, with everything from the psychedelic sets to the multitude of outfits being as colourful as a candy wrapper." Madhur Mittal of The Tribune was particularly fond of the "devastating, delightful, delicious duo" of Zinta and Mukherji", noting their comic timing.

== Awards ==
Aashirwad Awards:

- Best Actress – Rani Mukerji

46th Filmfare Awards:

Nominated

- Best Supporting Actress – Rani Mukerji
- Best Female Playback Singer – Preeti & Pinky for "Piya Piya"
