= Jungle Ki Beti =

Indian film

- Directed by: R. Thakkar
- Produced by: Anil Singh
- Music by: Rajesh Roshan
- Release date: 1988
- Country: India
- Language: Hindi

Jungle Ki Beti is a 1988 Hindi adventure fantasy film of Bollywood, directed by R. Thakkar and produced by Anil Singh. Music director of the film was Rajesh Roshan.

== Plot ==
This is the story of girl who lives in jungle and tries to protect the forest from the poacher and mafias.

== Cast ==
- Salma Agha as Anamika, Jungle Girl
- Rakesh Bedi as Kaushik Nath
- Goga Kapoor as Randhir Singh
- Joginder as Hakim Pratap
- Kalpana Iyer as Shobha
- Arjun (Firoz Khan) as Goga
- Mohan Choti as Ramesh
- Brando Bakshi as Rajendra
