= Vijay Saxena =

Indian actor (1968–1994)

- Vijay Saxena and Sudha Chandran in Aakhri Chetawani
- Born: 1 January 1968; Dhubri, Assam, India
- Died: 24 June 1994 (aged 26); Mumbai, Maharashtra, India
- Other name: Naqli Amithabh
- Occupation: Actor
- Years active: 1990–1994

Vijay Saxena (1 January 1968 – 24 June 1994) was an Indian actor who was active in Hindi films from 1990 to 1994. He gained fame for his striking resemblance to Bollywood superstar Amitabh Bachchan, which opened doors for him to play lead roles in Hindi movies. Saxena died in a car accident in 1994. His real name was Mintu Paul.

== Career ==
Saxena initially started his career in the film industry as a spotboy and later pursued a B.A. degree in Hindi. He made his acting debut in the film Swarg Yahan Narak Yahan, which starred Mithun Chakraborty. He also appeared in the parody film Ramgarh Ke Sholay (1991), which was inspired by Sholay (1975). The film also had other look-alike actors; Navin Rathod of Anil Kapoor, Anand Kumar of Govinda and Kishore Bhanushali of Dev Anand. He was paired opposite Sudha Chandran in Aakhri Chetawani. He was signed by a top director of Bollywood at the time of his death in 1994.

== Filmography ==
Year	Film	Director
1991	Swarg Yahan Narak Yahan	Vimal Kumar
1991	Ramgarh Ke Sholay	Ajit Diwani
1992	Dil Ka Kya Kasoor	Lawrence D'Souza
1992	Basanti Tangewali	
1992	Ganga Bani Shola	
1993	Baaghi Sultana	
1993	Aakhri Chetawani	
1993	Phoolan Hasina Ramkali	
1994	Gangapur Ki Geeta	
