= Hogaya Dimaagh Ka Dahi =

Hogaya Dimaagh ka Dahi
- Directed by: Fauzia Arshi
- Screenplay by: Santosh Bhartiya
- Story by: Fauzia Arshi
- Produced by: Santosh Bhartiya; Fauzia Arshi
- Starring: Kader Khan; Om Puri; Sanjay Mishra; Raajpal Yadav; Amit J; Razak Khan; Amita Nangia; Vijay Patkar; Chitrashi Rawat
- Cinematography: Najeeb Khan, Nazir Khan
- Edited by: DML Studioz
- Music by: Fauzia Arshi
- Production company: Daily Multimedia Limited
- Release date: 16 October 2015
- Country: India
- Language: Hindi

Hogaya Dimaagh Ka Dahi is a 2015 Hindi-language comedy drama film directed by Fauzia Arshi and produced by Santosh Bhartiya and Fauzia Arshi for Daily Multimedia Limited. The film stars Kader Khan, Om Puri, Raajpal Yadav, Sanjay Mishra, Razak Khan, Vijay Patkar, Amita Nangia, Chitrashi Rawat, Bunty Chopra, Subhash Yadav, Danish Bhat and Amit J. It marked the last film appearance of Kader Khan, before his death in 2018.

== Plot ==
The story is about how a father plots a situation for his irresponsible and spoilt sons so they are forced to undergo hardships of life, learn to value relationships and understand the harsh facts of life. Ishwar Singh Chauhan (Kader Khan) is on his death bed when he tells his three sons – Harry, Inder and Veeru (HIV) about a 'haveli' that he has left behind for them as his sole inheritance.

The drama and humor unfolds when they gets to know one family already resides there and meets Mirza Kishan Singh Joseph (Om Puri) and his family. The cat and mouse race begins and while in trying to get back the ‘haveli’, they encounters different people from different walks of life.

When Mirza Kishan Singh Joseph shows his adamance of not leaving the ‘haveli’ and asks them to get out, HIV then gets introduced by Masala (Raajpal Yadav) to Aashiq Ali Advocate (Sanjay Mishra) and Teeli Bhai (Razak Khan) who gives them tips and tricks in order to get back their property.

== Cast ==
- Kader Khan as Ishwar Singh Chauhan
- Om Puri as Mirza Kishan Singh Joseph
- Raajpal Yadav as Masala
- Sanjay Mishra as Aashiq Ali Advocate
- Razak Khan as Teeli Bhai
- Amita Nangia as Mujjee
- Vijay Patkar as Bawle
- Chitrashi Rawat as Sara
- Subhash Yadav as Pauwwa
- Amit J as Harry
- Imran Khan – Special Appearance
- Bunty Chopra as Inder
- Danish Bhat as Veeru
- Heaven as Gabbar

== Soundtrack ==
Hogaya Dimaagh Ka Dahi

Soundtrack album by Fauzia Arshi
- Genre: Feature film soundtrack
- Length: 20.02
- Language: Hindi
- Label: Zee Music Company
- Producer: Daily Multimedia Limited

The soundtrack of the film album is composed by Fauzia Arshi and lyrics written by Shabbir Ahmed, Anis Ali Sabri, Ravi Chopra, poetry by Allama Iqbal, Amir Khusro and Krishan Bihari Noor.The music rights for the film are acquired by Zee Music Company.

- Track listing

No.	Title	Lyrics	Music	Singer(s)	Length
1.	"Baap Hona Paap"	Anis Ali Sabri	Fauzia Arshi	Mika Singh	3:09
2.	"Dimaagh Ka Dahi"	Shabbir Ahmed	Fauzia Arshi	Kunal Ganjawala, Ritu Pathak	4:04
3.	"Kabhi Toh Sun Ghaur Se"	Ravi Chopra	Fauzia Arshi	Fauzia Arshi	4:30
4.	"Maula Maula"	Fauzia Arshi, Allama Iqbal, Amir Khusro & Krishan Bihari Noor	Fauzia Arshi	Kailash Kher, Fauzia Arshi	6:49
5.	"Mashup"			Various Artists	2:10
Total length:					20:02

== Production ==
=== Development ===
Producer –Director Fauzia Arshi makes her directorial debut with Hogaya Dimaagh Ka Dahi. It is produced by Santosh Bhartiya and Fauzia Arshi under the banner Daily Multimedia Limited. Since, it was a story written by herself, she decided to direct it without any second thoughts. She wrote the story and dialogues herself. Fauzia says, "the characters in the movie are created from her observation of people in her life. Such people exist in real life and I have grown up watching them." Santosh Bhartiya (Editor-in-Chief of Chauthi Duniya) wrote its screenplay keeping in mind the intricacies of the current society where kids are spoilt and then lose touch with reality as they grow into adulthood.

=== Filming ===
Hogaya Dimaagh Ka Dahi is Fauzia Arshi's first directorial venture. The major part of the film is shot in Kandaghat, Chail, Shimla in Himachal Pradesh and SarkhejRoza, Ahmedabad in Gujarat. Director was not satisfied with the already shotsufi song in the film ‘MaulaMaula’, she decided to go on floor once again. On 27 and 28 July, team Hogaya Dimaagh Ka Dahi shot the song under the able direction and choreography of Fauzia Arshi at SarkhejRoza in Ahmedabad with Shahbaz Khan.
