= Saawan Ke Geet =

- Directed by: R. Bhattacharya
- Produced by: A. J. Pictures
- Starring: Sanjeev Kumar; Rekha
- Music by: Laxmikant–Pyarelal
- Release date: 22 March 1978
- Country: India
- Language: Hindi

Saawan Ke Geet (Monsoon Songs) is a 1978 Bollywood drama film, directed by R. Bhattacharya. The film's music was composed by the duo Laxmikant–Pyarelal, with lyrics by Majrooh Sultanpuri.

== Cast ==
- Sanjeev Kumar as Kishan
- Rekha as Radha
- Aruna Irani as Bijli
- Mehmood as Chanda Ustad
- Amjad Khan
- Satyendra Kapoor
- Jagdeep
- Joginder
- Bhagwan Dada
- Om Shivpuri

== Music ==
1. "Ho Gaya Re Ye Sawan Bairi" – Kishore Kumar
2. "Tum Se Mil Ke Dilbar Yaar Hum To Lut Gaye Beech Bazar" – Lata Mangeshkar, Kishore Kumar
3. "Daudo Kanhai Mera Mara Mai Bechara" – Manna Dey
4. "O Mera Pallu Kahe Khiche" – Lata Mangeshkar
