= Jungle Queen (1991 film) =

1991 Hindi film

- Directed by: K. Chandra
- Produced by: Ramesh Purushottam
- Starring: See below
- Music by: Anand–Milind
- Release date: 1991
- Country: India
- Language: Hindi

Jungle Queen is a Hindi action drama film of Bollywood, directed by K. Chandra and produced by Ramesh Purushottam. This film was released in 1991. Music director of the film was Anand–Milind.

== Cast ==
- Satish Shah
- Feroz Khan
- Poonam Dasgupta
- Dalip Tahil
- Shiva Rindani
- Gajendra Chauhan
- Raghu Khosla

== Music ==
1. " Ek Do Teen" - Abhijeet, Sapna Mukherjee
2. "Hum Tumhein Mil Gaye" - Suresh Wadkar, Sadhana Sargam
3. "Hum Tumhein Mil Gaye v2" - Suresh Wadkar, Sadhana Sargam
4. "Main Haan Haan Karti Hoon" - Abhijeet, Sapna Mukherjee
5. "Naache Mayura" - Anuradha Paudwal
6. "O Meri Jungle Queen" - Udit Narayan, Kavita Krishnamurthy
