= Loha (1997 film) =

- Poster
- Directed by: Kanti Shah
- Written by: Bashir Babar
- Produced by: Surekha Gawli
- Starring: Dharmendra; Mithun Chakraborty; Shakti Kapoor
- Cinematography: Akram Khan
- Edited by: Jugal
- Music by: Tabun
- Distributed by: Jockey Films
- Release date: 17 October 1997
- Running time: 130 minutes
- Country: India
- Language: Hindi
- Budget: ₹15 million
- Box office: ₹41 million (India Net Collection)

Loha is a 1997 Indian Hindi language action crime superhero film directed by Kanti Shah. The film features cast including Dharmendra, Mithun Chakraborty, Shakti Kapoor and Mohan Joshi. Govinda and Manisha Koirala make cameos as themselves. The film has no connection with the 1987 film of the same name, which also starred Dharmendra.

Loha released worldwide on 17 October 1997. This film is the remake adaptation of the Malyalam movie Mafia (1993) starring Suresh Gopi which was also remade in Hindi the previous year under the same title (1996) again starring Dharmendra in the lead role.

== Plot ==
The movie begins with the introduction to a powerful underworld Don, Lukka. He has a stake in all illegal activities like weapon smuggling, drugs, and land encroachment. Lukka's sidekicks include Salim Chikna, Takla, muscleman Babu Batla, and Munna Mobile.

Lukka ousts his erstwhile mentor Tandya Bhai to emerge as the number 1 don of Mumbai. After seeing Tandya rebel against Lukka's disloyalty, he captures Tandya's sister and lets Batla rape and kill her. Tandya is enraged by Lukka's actions and goes to kill him. However, he is surrounded by Lukka's men and is convinced by Lukka that he has no reason to live, following which Lukka himself kills Tandya.

The horrific act of Lukka was felt across the 'basti' where Shankar lived. A curfew is placed on the basti where Shankar meets Inspector Kaale, a corrupt inspector who helps Lukka in washing off his crimes in the eyes of the law. Inspector Kaale is always at loggerheads with the commissioner, who is an honest officer. The basti rallies against Lukka's thuggery but to no avail as the leader of the rally is killed by Lukka in broad daylight. When Inspector Kaale comes to investigate the matter, he argues with an angry Shankar, who tells the inspector to inform the goons that their end will come soon. Shankar later meets Lukka and they become sworn enemies.

Geeta, an aide of Mustafa gets to know about the open challenge that Shankar posed to Lukka. She brings Shankar and Mustafa together to plot against Lukka. Mustafa used to be the top don of Bombay until Lukka became powerful. Lukka ordered Batla to slice Mustafa's hands, which led to Mustafa dedicating his life to ending Lukka's reign. He informs Shankar it was Batla who killed Tandya's sister. This leads to Shankar chasing and beating up Batla. Fearing his life, Batla offers to testify against Lukka. But Lukka reaches the scene where Shankar cornered Batla. The commissioner arrests Lukka, Takla, and Batla. Lukka and Takla soon get bail at the behest of the minister. Secretly, Inspector Kaale lets Batla escape from lockup to start a new life away from Lukka. Unfortunately, once Batla was released, he encounters Lukka and his sidekicks. Angered at Batla's treachery, Lukka stabs and kills him.

Inspector Sujata Singh comes across some goons molesting a woman. While protecting the woman, she herself gets harassed by the goons. Fortunately, Arjun comes to the rescue of the inspector and the woman. Arjun is an alcoholic who has no will to live due to his loneliness. Years ago, he used to be a soldier in love with his girlfriend Karishma (Ramya Krishnan). Arjun was after the life of a weapons smuggler Thakur Vikraal 'Mahakaal' who escapes Arjun's attempts to capture him. In Arjun's first attempt, Vikraal manages to escape by air. Vikraal kills Karishma to terrorise Arjun. Realising this, Arjun chases Vikraal and shoots him. Eight years later, he realises Vikraal is still alive. Arjun chases Vikraal and captures him at gunpoint. There, he tells Arjun that eight years back while escaping from Arjun's hands, Vikraal found his beggar lookalike. Vikraal gave the beggar his clothes and Arjun had unknowingly killed the beggar. After hearing this, Arjun finally kills Vikraal. As a result, Arjun is let go from the military and he began seeking obsessive refuge in liquor.

In the present day, Shankar finds Arjun in this drunken state and asks him about his story. They become close friends, and Shankar takes Arjun to the hospital for an operation saving his life. Arjun owed his life to Shankar. Meanwhile, the minister finds Shankar's sister Lakshmi being molested by a few men. The minister saves Lakshmi from the men, but takes her straight to Lukka. Lukka starts harassing her but she manages to escape. He sends Munna Mobile behind her who finally kills Lakshmi. Shankar finds Lakshmi dead and catches a glimpse of Munna Mobile running away. He registers a case with Inspector Kaale, who promptly informs Lukka that Shankar is on the lookout for Munna Mobile now. While Inspector Kaale discusses Munna Mobile's safety with him, Shankar finds the two talking and starts beating up Munna Mobile. Inspector Kaale stops Shankar from thrashing Munna Mobile and locks him up. Shankar gets transferred to jail where Arjun promises Shankar he will help him take down Lukka. Arjun meets Mustafa, who regrets telling Shankar about Batla, since it led to Shankar's sister's death. They wait for Shankar's release before planning their next move.

In a completely separate comedic subplot, Manisha and her father arrive in Mumbai via train to find a suitable boy for Manisha's marriage. But Manisha only wishes to marry the famous actor Govinda. Coincidentally, she finds a coolie at the railway station who looks just like Govinda and also claims to be him. They wish to marry each other against his father's wish who believes the coolie is just a duplicate of Govinda. Later that night, Manisha and her father encounter the real Govinda getting out of his car. When Govinda realises it is the actress Manisha Koirala wanting to marry him, they both instantly fall in love, this time with Manisha's father's approval for marriage.

Shankar gets released later, still feeling the pain of his sister's horrific death. Geeta informs Shankar of Munna Mobile's whereabouts. Shankar reaches a construction site in Lokhandwala where Munna Mobile was overseeing the construction after he seized control of the building. Shankar kills Munna Mobile at the site, by throwing him off the 40-storey building, with Lukka hearing everything via Munna Mobile's mobile. Next, Shankar, Arjun, and Mustafa plan to destroy the huge stock of Lukka's weapons which he stored at his hotel. This was a huge blow to Lukka's fortunes. After destroying the weapons, Shankar targets Salim Chikna with a warning that he will be killed by noon the next day. A scared Salim Chikna rushes to Lukka and Inspector Kaale for protection. But Salim Chikna does not trust Inspector Kaale and Lukka to protect him. So he reaches the airport at 11 AM the next day to fly to Dubai. To Salim Chikna's surprise, Shankar was waiting for him at the airport where he gets killed.

As Shankar's heroics were getting heavy on Lukka, he is mad at Inspector Kaale for not being able to control Shankar. Inspector Kaale suggests he will apply for TADA to be imposed on Shankar, which includes a shoot at sight order. The commissioner does not allow Inspector Kaale to do so. Consequently, Lukka uses his connection with the minister, who then visited the commissioner and ordered him to impose TADA on Shankar. Around the same time, Geeta gets attacked by a few men barging into her house. Shankar arrives to protect her, but could not save Geeta from death.

After learning that Shankar could be shot any time by the police, Mustafa guides him to steal confidential papers of the minister which contain all his corrupt deeds. Shankar blackmails the minister using those papers, and orders him to reverse the TADA order. Inspector Kaale became the new commissioner and the existing commissioner received transfer orders with immediate effect. However, due to Shankar's blackmail, the helpless minister had to reverse these orders, and Inspector Kaale was suspended from duty. A dejected Kaale finds Shankar on the street, and Shankar takes this opportunity to kill Kaale.

Lukka becomes furious with the minister's orders which led to Kaale's death. The minister tells him he has no choice, but can work in Lukka's favour again if he can get the confidential file from Shankar. Meanwhile, the minister attempts to rape his driver's daughter. Learning this, the driver rushes to Shankar to save his daughter and also tells him that it was the minister who took his sister to Lukka, which led to her death. Shankar arrives at the minister's house and kills him.

Arjun impersonates a gangster and calls Takla, telling him where he can find Shankar. This was a trap to kill Takla, which Lukka realised a bit too late. On reaching the location, Takla fired his gun at Shankar. But the bullet could not hurt Shankar's iron body. Shankar killed Takla just when the police arrived at the scene, which led to his arrest at the hands of Inspector Sujata. To free Shankar from lockup, Arjun enters the police station acting like a drunkard trying to instigate the police. After he gets ushered by the police into lockup with Shankar, Arjun attacks the policemen and escapes with Shankar.

The final showdown happens in the rocky terrain stronghold where Lukka reigned supreme with his men. Mustafa arrives at the scene and Lukka gets to know it was Mustafa guiding Shankar all this while to destroy him. Mustafa came wearing a bomb that blew up and destroyed parts of Lukka's hideout, killing himself too. Later, Shankar and Arjun arrive at the hideout where they engage with Lukka in a verbal battle before fighting. They manage to kill all of Lukka's men. A bullet from Lukka's gun was about to kill Shankar, but Arjun jumped in between, which led to his death. In his last moments, Arjun asks Shankar to finish his incomplete work and kill Lukka. After a short physical fight where Shankar beat up Lukka, he finally shot his worst enemy to death. The police arrive at the scene after Lukka died, and placed Shankar under arrest.

== Cast ==
- Dharmendra as Shankar
- Mithun Chakraborty as Arjun
- Mohan Joshi as Lukka Bhai
- Shakti Kapoor as Mustafa
- Ishrat Ali as Inspector Kaale
- Razzak Khan as Munna Mobile
- Harish Patel as Salim Chikna
- Rami Reddy as Takla
- Pramod Moutho as Minister Jumbo
- Babban Yadav as Puranmal, the Minister's driver
- Bajrangi as Babu Batla
- Deepak Shirke as Tandya (extended appearance)
- Kiran Kumar as Police Commissioner Gorakhnath
- Ramya Krishnan as Karishma (special appearance)
- Sujata Mehta as Police Inspector Sujata Singh
- Rajesh Vivek as Thakur Vikraal 'Mahakaal' (extended appearance)
- Govinda as Raj Devgan (Cameo appearance)
- Manisha Koirala as Rachna (Cameo appearance)
- Dinesh Hingoo as Chamanlal, Manisha's father
- Alphonsa in a special appearance

== Production ==
Though the movie is set in Mumbai, it was shot at multiple locations in India. The outdoor locations of the movie were shot at Chennai (including AVM Studio and Vijaya Vauhini Studios), Ooty, Bengaluru, and Hyderabad. Parts of the film were also shot in Mumbai, including Film City and Chandivali Studio. Many scenes of the film were shot at the HAL Airport in Bengaluru, as was evident by the commercial planes landing and taking off behind the shot and the usage of helicopters in the movie owned by the now-defunct Deccan Aviation, whose hub was at the HAL Airport.

The song Sadeness (Part I) by Enigma features in a few scenes of the film.

== Soundtrack ==
Music: Tabun, Lyrics: Nitin Raikwar and Saawan Kumar.

| # | Title | Singers | Picturised on |
|---|---|---|---|
| 1 | "Teri Behna Se Dosti" | Abhijeet Bhattacharya and Poornima | Govinda and Manisha Koirala |
| 2 | "Toot Gaya Dil" | Kumar Sanu | Mithun Chakraborty |
| 3 | "Pee Le Pee Le Pinewale" | Vinod Rathod and Poornima | Dharmendra and Harish Patel |
| 4 | "Main Kachchi Kali Hoon" | Shweta Shetty | Rajesh Vivek |
| 5 | "Door Na Jao Jee" | Suneeta Rao | Ramya Krishnan |
