= Kanti Shah =

Indian film director and producer

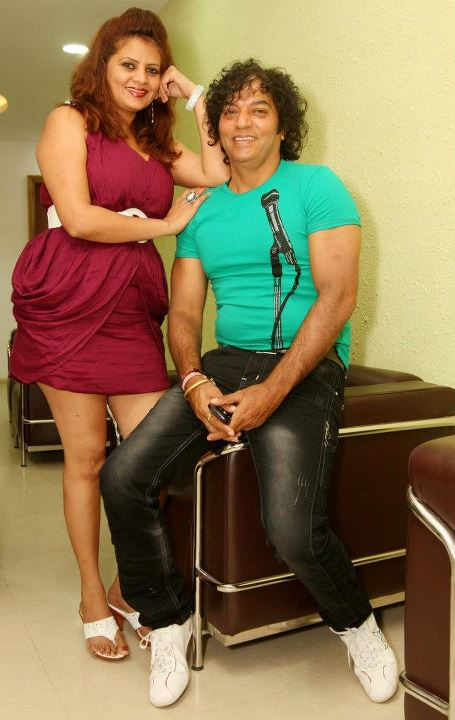
- Shah (right) with actress Sapna Sappu
- Occupations: Film Director, producer, screenwriter
- Years active: 1988 – present

Kanti Shah is a Bollywood Hindi movies director, producer, screenwriter and writer of Hindi movies, especially B movies featuring Mithun Chakraborty and Dharmendra in later half of the 1990s, like Loha in 1997, Gunda in 1998, and Kanti Shah ke Angoor in 2002.

== Early life ==
Kanti Shah is a Gujarati by origin.

== Selected filmography ==
No	Movie name	Year of release	Director	Producer	Writer
1	Maar Dhaad	1988		Yes	
2	Ganga Jamuna Ki Lalkar	1991	Yes	Yes	
3	Basanti Tangewali	1992	Yes	Yes	
4	Ganga Bani Shola	1992	Yes		
5	Phoolan Hasina Ramkali	1992	Yes	Yes	Yes
6	Aag Kaa Toofan	1993	Yes		Yes
7	Rani Aur Maharani	1993	Yes		
8	Aag Aur Chingari	1993	Yes		
9	Aag Aandhi Aur Toofan	1994	Yes		
10	Veer	1995	Yes		Yes
11	Rangbaaz	1996	Yes	Yes	
12	Loha (1997 film)	1997	Yes		
13	Gunda (film)	1998	Yes		
14	Bhoot Ka Darr	1999	Yes		
15	Dacait Queen	1999	Yes		
16	Munnibai	1999	Yes		Yes
17	Daku Ramkali	2000	Yes		
18	Jallad No. 1	2000	Yes		
19	Meri Jung Ka Elaan	2000	Yes		
20	Daku Ganga Jamuna	2000	Yes		
21	Aag Ke Sholay	2001	Yes		
22	Aaj Ka Gunda	2001	Yes		
23	Galiyon Ka Badshah	2001	Yes		
24	Jagira	2001	Yes		
25	Jungle Ki Sherni	2001	Yes		
26	Qatil Chudail	2001	Yes		
27	Zaroorat	2001	Yes		
28	Darwaza	2002	Yes		
29	Duplicate Sholay	2002	Yes		
30	Khooni Shaitan	2002	Yes		
31	Shola Bai	2002	Yes		
32	Jung Ke Sholay	2003	Yes		
33	Meri Ganga Ki Saugandh	2003	Yes		
34	Pyaasa Haiwan	2003	Yes		
35	Pyaasi	2003	Yes		
36	Pyaasi Bhootni	2003	Yes		
37	Angoor	2005	Yes	Yes	
38	Garam	2005	Yes	Yes	
39	Galiyon ka Badshaah	2006	Yes		
40	Jagira	2006	Yes		
41	Free Entry	2006	Yes		
42	MMS Kand	2014	Yes		
43	OK	2015	Yes		
44	Haunted Jungle	2015	Yes		
45	Sapna ki Jawani	2015	Yes		
46	Maut 2	2015	Yes		
