= Ramgarh Ke Sholay =

- Poster
- Directed by: Ajit Dewani
- Written by: Ajit Dewani
- Produced by: Rajendra S. Jariwala
- Starring: Amjad Khan; Vijay Saxena; Kishore Bhanushali
- Cinematography: Manish Bhatt
- Edited by: A. Muthu
- Music by: Anu Malik
- Distributed by: Charmi Films
- Release date: 21 June 1991
- Running time: 124 minutes
- Country: India
- Language: Hindi

Ramgarh Ke Sholay (transl. Flames Of Ramgarh) is a 1991 Indian Hindi-language action parody film directed by Ajit Dewani, starring Amjad Khan, Vijay Saxena, Kishore Bhanushali. The film parodies the 1975 film Sholay

Amjad Khan, who played the iconic villain Gabbar Singh in the original, reprises his role in the film. This film was a sleeper hit. The film also features lookalike actors Vijay Saxena, who resembles Amitabh Bachchan (who played Jai in the original Sholay), Kishore Bhanushali, who resembles Dev Anand as well as lookalike actors of Anil Kapoor and Govinda.

== Cast ==
- Amjad Khan as Gabbar Singh
- Vijay Saxena as Vijay
- Kishore Bhanushali as Johny
- Dinesh Hingoo as Dinesh Chandani
- Manmauji as Havaldar Dhandakar
- Mehmood Junior as Ghanshyam "Ghanu" "Ghaniya"
- Rajendra Nath as Inspector Ghanekar
- Harish Patel as Inspector Himmat Singh
- Nargis as Jaiwanti Singh

== Songs ==
The songs were composed by Anu Malik and released on Venus Records & Tapes.

1. "Dosti Dosti Teri Meri Dosti" (Sad) – Kumar Sanu
2. "Dosti Dosti Teri Meri Dosti" (Happy) – Kumar Sanu, Mohammed Aziz
3. "Raapat Rola Mat Karo" – Kumar Sanu, Kavita Krishnamurthy
4. "Tumhari Zulfen Shaam Se Roshan" – Kumar Sanu, Kavita Krishnamurthy
5. "Tu Meri Zindagi Hai, Tu Meri Bandagi Hai" – Kumar Sanu, Alka Yagnik
6. "Shridevi Ji Bhaagyashri Ji" – Abhijeet
