= Pandit Aur Pathan =

- Directed by: Joginder Shelly
- Starring: Nazir Hussain; Agha
- Music by: Sonik Omi; M. G. Hashmat (lyrics)
- Release date: 2 December 1977
- Country: India
- Language: Hindi

Pandit Aur Pathan (lit. 'Pandit and Pathan') is a 1977 Indian Hindi-language action film directed by Joginder Shelly.

== Cast ==
- Agha as Hairan
- Helen as Salma
- Nazir Hussain as Roopa's blind dad
- Dheeraj Kumar as Birju
- Kiran Kumar as Inspector Anand
- Mehmood as Shankar a.k.a. Pandit
- Ram Mohan as Ramzan
- Mukri as Parheshan
- Nazneen as Radha
- Tun Tun as Champakali
- Seema Kapoor as Radha's friend
- Joginder as Sher 'Sheroo' Khan a.k.a. Pathan
- Jayshree T. as Chamakchalho
- Rajan Haksar as Police Inspector
- Meena T. as Roopa

== Songs ==
1. "Bam Bam Bhole Khila De Bhang Ke Gole" – Manna Dey, Asha Bhosle
2. "Mai Pandit Tu Pathan Ek Dhuje Per Kurbaan" – Mohammed Rafi, Manna Dey
3. "Bataye Rakhi Ka Vyavahar" – Mohammed Rafi, Manna Dey, Asha Bhosle, Kumar Sonik, Dilraj Kaur, Sunita
4. "Kya Le Ke Aaya Tha Kya Le Ke Jaana Hai" – Mohammed Rafi, Manna Dey
5. "O Mera Imaan Tujhpe Kurbaan" – Mohammed Rafi, Manna Dey
6. "Tune Pyar Se Liya Jo Mera Naam" – Asha Bhosle
7. "Kaise Bhoolun Meri Khatir Tune Ki Kurbaani" – Mohammed Rafi, Manna Dey, Asha Bhosle, Kumar Sonik, Dilraj Kaur, Sunita
