= Poonam Dasgupta =

Indian actress

- Born: 6th May, 1968; Mumbai, Maharashtra
- Occupation: Actress
- Years active: 1989–present
- Known for: Asha O Bhalobasha

Poonam Dasgupta is an Indian actress. She is known for her roles in Bollywood films. She has also acted in Hindi television serials and in plays. After retiring from the film industry, she made a comeback with the play Begum Sahiba co-starring Rahul Roy. She has acted in series of Zee Horror Show episodes between 1993 and 1999.

== Filmography ==
| Year | Film | Role | Language | Notes |
|---|---|---|---|---|
| 1986 | Vidhaan | | Hindi | |
| 1987 | Hiraasat | | Hindi | |
| 1988 | Insaaf Ki Manzil | | Hindi | |
| 1988 | Shiv Ganga | | Hindi | |
| 1989 | Aakrosh | | Bengali | |
| 1989 | Asha O Bhalobasha | | Bengali | |
| 1989 | Amar shapoth | | Bengali | |
| 1989 | Sau Saal Baad | | Hindi | |
| 1989 | Lahu Ki Aawaz | | Hindi | |
| 1990 | Rosa I Love You | | Malayalam | |
| 1990 | Aalasyam | | Malayalam | |
| 1990 | Vasavadatta | | Malayalam | |
| 1990 | Hasino Ka Mela | | Hindi | |
| 1991 | Eagle | Latha | Malayalam | |
| 1991 | Vashyam | | Malayalam | |
| 1991 | Meena Bazaar | Mona | Hindi | |
| 1991 | Aranyadalli Abhimanyu | | Kannada | |
| 1991 | Jungle Queen | | Hindi | |
| 1991 | Aakhri Cheekh | | Hindi | |
| 1991 | Ganga Kahe Pukar Ke | | Bhojpuri | |
| 1992 | Thummeda | | Telugu | |
| 1992 | Mr. Bond | | Hindi | Special appearance |
| 1992 | Meri Janeman | | Hindi | |
| 1992 | Pyar Ka Tohfa | | Hindi | |
| 1992 | Aurat Aur Parindha | | Hindi | |
| 1993 | Kattabomman | Rani | Tamil | |
| 1993 | Aaja Meri Jaan | | Hindi | |
| 1993 | Rani Aur Maharani | | Hindi | |
| 1994 | Pathreela Raasta | | Hindi | |
| 1995 | Jhumka | | Hindi | |
| 1995 | Aazmayish | | Hindi | |
| 1995 | Policewala Gunda | | Hindi | |
| 1995 | Rani Hindustani | | Hindi | |
| 1995 | Fauji | | Hindi | |
| 1995 | Dil Ka Doctor | | Hindi | |
| 1996 | Papi Gudia | | Hindi | |
| 1996 | Hind Ki Beti | | Hindi | |
| 1996 | Hum Hain Premi | | Hindi | |
| 1996 | Zordaar | | Hindi | |
| 1997 | Dil Ke Jharoke Main | | Hindi | |
| 1998 | Purani Kabar | | Hindi | |
| 2000 | Glamour Girl | Kalpana | Hindi | |
| 2000 | Krishna Tere Desh Main | | Hindi | |
| 2001 | Saugandh Geeta Ki | | Hindi | |
| 2001 | Khooni Tantrik | Rajani | Hindi | |
| 2005 | 7 Aatankwadi | | Hindi | Special appearance |
| 2009 | Son of Dracula | | Hindi | Chudail Poonam Budiya |

== Television ==
| Year | Show | Role | Notes |
|---|---|---|---|
| 1995 | Shrimaan Shrimati | Jwala | Special Appearance |
| 1997 | Kya Baat Hai | Madhumati Mehta | Co-stars Darshan Jariwala, Dilip Joshi and Vrajesh Hirjee |
| 1993-99 | Zee Horror Show | Various Role | Full Time Appearance |
