= Karz Chukana Hai =

1991 Indian film

- Directed by: Vimal Kumar
- Written by: Kader Khan (dialogues)
- Screenplay by: Gyandev Agnihotri
- Story by: Vimal Kumar
- Produced by: Vimal Kumar
- Starring: Govinda; Juhi Chawla
- Cinematography: Anil Dhanda
- Edited by: Prakash Dave
- Music by: Rajesh Roshan
- Production company: Shivam Chitrya
- Release date: 26 April 1991 (India)
- Running time: 165 min.

Karz Chukana Hai (transl. debt to be paid) is a 1991 Indian Bollywood drama film directed and produced by Vimal Kumar. It stars Govinda and Juhi Chawla in pivotal roles.

== Plot ==
Atmaram (Kader Khan) has two sons, elder one is Vijay and younger one Ravi. He stays with his two sons and his wife. He works in a company whose boss is Seth Usman (Shakti Kapoor). He is not honest with his work and normally relies on his elder son for his living hood.

Ravi meets Radha (Juhi Chawla) who works in advertisement agency (part time). It is then shown that both of them study in same college and they fall in love.

Eventually, Atmaram is thrown out of job. Vijay supports family honestly, but Ravi understands his father. Vijay has a little son who has heart ailment, but Vijay can’t afford the treatment. Both the brothers fight but Atmaram is still indifferent.

Vijay overworks in his office and try to get extra money. One day, due to extreme exhaustion, Vijay falls off the height and dies. Ravi gives his father piece of mind and Atmaram started to realise his mistake.

On his cremation ceremony, Vijay’s father-in-law takes his daughter and grandson to his house. It is then Atmaram is broken and taken aback. He starts to rectify his mistakes, brings his daughter in law and grandson back home. He tries to get his grandson operated. For that, he needs to collect 25,000 rupees. He finally goes to Seth Usman for job, but Shakti Kapoor insults him and throws him out. Atmaram then goes to look for other jobs, but nobody employs him. He then takes up odd jobs-pulling rickshaw.

One day, Seth Usman was travelling with 10 lakhs rupees and goons attack him. He is saved by Ravi. Seth Usman offers him help, Ravi request him to take his father back on job.

Seth Usman his impressed by his honesty and hard work and makes him supervisor of the godown. However, one of his colleague tries to bribe him. Eventually he is caught red handed as Atmaram informs his intentions to Seth Usman.

The grandson of Atmaram falls sick and the doctor informs that the boy needs to get operated in a month’s time. Ravi had collected 10,000 rupees while he was at work, he gives all that money to Usman Seth and request him to pay this to Atmaram so that he feels independent and confident.

Usman Seth tells Atmaram that there’s a race for elderly and Atmaram decides to participate. He convinces the doctor to operate on his grandson and he shall pay rest of the money after winning the race. The goons who were about to rob Seth Usman plan to take revenge from Atmaram and the race ground where Ravi has face off with them.

Finally Atmaram wins the race but has heart attack while running and is taken to hospital. It is shown that finally he could repay what his son has done for him.

== Cast ==
- Govinda as Ravi Mathur
- Juhi Chawla as Radha
- Raj Kiran as Vijay Mathur
- Shoma Anand as Sapna Mathur
- Gulshan Grover as Gulu
- Kader Khan as Atmaram Mathur
- Satyen Kappu as Ramnath, Sapna's Father
- Seema Deo as Laxmi Mathur
- Shakti Kapoor as Seth Usman
- Asrani as Khare Ram
- Avtar Gill as George D, souza, Vijay's Company Boss
- Tej Sapru as Kailash, Seth Usman Cashier
- Bharat Bhushan as Mahesh, Ravi's College Principal
- Vikas Anand as Mohan Sachdev, Ravi's Company Boss
- Dinesh Hingoo as Hasteyram Hingoo
- Viju Khote as Gama Pahelwan
- Yunus Parvez as Ram Mohan Dhaniram
- Shubha Khote as Sheela, Radha's mother
- Guddi Maruti as Mrs Dudhwani Khareram
- Kishore Bhanushali as Balwinder, Ravi's College friend
- Mehmood Jr.

== Soundtrack ==
#	Title	Singer(s)
1	"Andaaz Bahkne Lagte"	Udit Narayan, Sadhana Sargam
2	"Bheegi Hoon Main"	Amit Kumar, Sadhana Sargam
3	"Tere Hathon Ne Chhua"	Govinda, Amit Kumar, Sapna Mukherjee
4	"Karz Chukana Hai"	Nitin Mukesh
5	"Karz Chukana Hai" (Sad)	Nitin Mukesh
6	"Doctron Ki Toli Aai"	Amit Kumar, Dinesh Hingoo
7	"Pahlwanon Kadardanon"	Mohammed Aziz, Falguni Seth
