= Ganga Jamuna Ki Lalkar =

Hindi action film

Ganga Jamuna Ki Lalkar is a Hindi action film of Bollywood directed and produced by Kanti Shah. This film was released on 8 November 1991 under the banner of Mangla Films.

== Plot ==
The film revolves around the clash between a female police officer and a lady dacait.

== Music ==
1. "Challa Tu Le Jaa Nishaniya" - Udit Narayan, Sadhana Sargam

== Cast ==
- Anupam Kher as Lala Vijay Awasthi
- Kader Khan as Police Constable Shekhar
- Shagufta Ali as Ganga
- Dalip Tahil as Jwala Singh
- Goga Kapoor as Police Officer Randhir
- Rajesh Vivek as Chaturdas
- Sriprada as Jamuna
- Charan Deo as Suresh
- Shripradha as Roopmati
- Seema Vaz as Madhumati
