= Daku Ramkali =

- Directed by: Kanti Shah
- Written by: Basir Babar; Dev Kohli; Jail Singh
- Produced by: Gulab Seikh
- Starring: Shakti Kapoor; Rajesh Vivek; Mohan Joshi; Kiran Kumar
- Cinematography: Salim Suma
- Edited by: Vikas
- Music by: Sawan Kumar
- Production company: Gulab Pictures
- Release date: 18 February 2000
- Running time: 134 minutes
- Country: India
- Language: Hindi

Daku Ramkali is a Hindi-language action drama film of Bollywood directed by Kanti Shah and produced by Gulab Seikh. This film was released on 18 February 2000 under the banner of Gulab Pictures.

== Plot ==
Sher Singh and Arjun Singh are identical twin brothers. Arjun is an honest police officer, but Sher Singh becomes a dacoit under the influence of Bajrang and his gang. Sher Singh's daughter Champa and Arjun Singh's daughter Raamkali are also twins. Bajrang's goon Dhanraj kills Arjun Singh, and he falsely blames Sher Singh. Sher Singh becomes imprisoned and escapes from jail. Although he tries to kill Dhanraj, Dhanraj kills him. In the meantime, Champa falls in love with Dhanraj's son Shankar, who is also a police officer. Raamkali wants to take revenge for her father's death and target Dhanraj.

== Cast ==
- Sapna as Daku Ramkali / Champa
- Shakti Kapoor as Abu Alu
- Mohan Joshi as Dhanraj
- Kiran Kumar as Arjun/ Sher Singh
- Sadashiv Amrapurkar as Bajrang
- Joginder as Daku Hakim Singh
- Rajesh Vivek as Daku Bhairav Singh
- Rami Reddy as Takla
- Anil Nagrath as Daku Gabbar Singh
- Razzak Khan as Daku Godbole
- Ishrat Ali as Daku Lambu Atta
