= Rajesh Vivek =

Indian actor

Rajesh Vivek Upadhyay
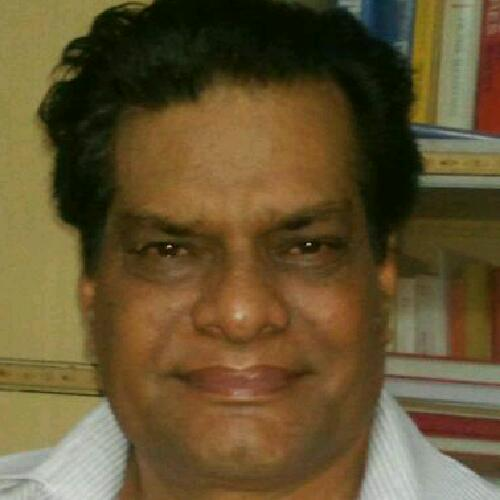
- Born: Rajesh Vivek Upadhyay; 31 January 1949; Jaunpur, United Provinces, India
- Died: 14 January 2016 (aged 66); Hyderabad, Telangana, India
- Years active: 1977–2016
- Spouse: Gayatri Vivek Upadhyay

Rajesh Vivek Upadhyay (31 January 1949 – 14 January 2016) was an Indian actor, mainly a Comedian. He is best known to Hindi film audiences for his role as the astrologer Guran in Lagaan (2001) and as the postmaster Nivaran in Swades (2004). He had also played role of Vyasa, author of the Hindu epic Mahabharata, in the popular Indian series Mahabharat. He made his mark as a villain in the beginning with films like Veerana (1988) and Joshilaay (1989), often playing the role of a henchman, and later took to portraying comedic and supporting characters. His other credits include Mujhse Shaadi Karogi, What's Your Raashee? and Bunty Aur Babli. Rajesh is also noted for his roles in the historic TV series Bharat Ek Khoj and in the TV Serial Aghori. He acted in ad series of Cadbury 5 Star as the "Pitaji" of the two sons Ramesh and Suresh, starting from the ad titled "Pitaji ki Patloon".

== Biography ==
Vivek was born on 31 January 1949 in Jaunpur, Uttar Pradesh. He obtained his Master of Arts degree in Ancient history & Archaeology from T. D. Degree College, Jaunpur, and trained at the National School of Drama in acting. Filmmaker Shyam Benegal first introduced him in films with his film Junoon (1978).

Rajesh died on 14 January 2016 at the age of 66 due to a massive heart attack while shooting for a film at Hyderabad.

== Filmography ==
=== Film ===
Year	Film	Role	Notes
1978	Junoon		
1982	Gandhi	Dr. Rajendra Prasad	
1983	Kalka (1983 film)	Mine Manager	
1985	Ram Teri Ganga Maili		
1986	Janbaaz		
1988	Veerana	Baba (sorcerer)	
1988	The Perfect Murder	Zero Police	
1988	The Deceivers	Priest	
1989	Joshilaay	Shaitan Yogi Daku	
1989	Nishane Bazi		
1989	Tridev	Raaghav	
1990	Hatim Tai	Departed	
1990	Kafan		
1991	Ganga Jamuna Ki Lalkar		
1991	Hatyarin	Tantrik Baba	
1991	Khatra	Jackson	
1991	Vishkanya		
1992	Nagin Aur Lootere		
1992	Vishwatma		
1992	Parasmani		
1993	Phoolan Hasina Ramkali		
1993	Maya Memsaab		
1994	Bandit Queen	Mustaquim	
1995	Karan Arjun		
1997	Loha	Thakur Vikraal 'Mahakaal'	
1998	Pardesi Babu		
1999	Munnibai		
1999	Kachche Dhaage		
2000	Daku Ramkali		
2001	Lagaan	Guran	
2003	Dil Ka Rishta		
2003	Dangerous Night		
2004	Asambhav	Pandit	
2004	Hatya: The Murder		
2004	Swades	Nivaran	
2004	Ab Tumhare Hawale Watan Saathiyo	Col Raghav Bhansali	
2005	Vaada	Inspector Khan	
2005	Bunty Aur Babli	Guru Ghantal Baba	
2007	Nanhe Jaisalmer	Dhurjan Singh	
2008	Bhole Shankar	Panditji	
2008	God Tussi Great Ho	Ghanshu	
2008	Jodhaa Akbar	Chughtai Khan	
2009	What's Your Raashee?	Bhautesh Joshi	
2010	Do Dooni Chaar		
2010	Khelein Hum Jee Jaan Sey	Shiraz-ul-haq	
2011	Mumbai Mast Kalandar		
2012	Agneepath	Bakshi	
2012	Son of Sardar	Mamaji	
2014	Dishkiyaoon	Gujjar	
2015	Yevade Subramanyam	Pemba	Telugu film
2016	Nagarahavu		Kannada film

=== Television ===
Year	Show	Role	Channel	Notes
1988	Bharat Ek Khoj	Ep 21 - Bhakt, Ep 32- Akbar Played role of Shiekh Mubarak.	DD National	
1988	Mahabharat	Ved Vyas	DD National	
1990	The Sword of Tipu Sultan		DD National	
1995	Aahat Season 1 (1995–2001)	Episode 12 to 14 Explosion	Sony Entertainment Television	
1996	Aghori			
1997	Shiv Mahapuran	Tarakaksha		
2005	Honi Anhoni	Anchor		
2011	Devon Ke Dev...Mahadev	Yalkoti	Life OK	
