= Aag Aur Chingari =

- Directed by: Kanti Shah
- Produced by: Devi Durga
- Starring: Asrani, Shakti Kapoor, Paresh Rawal
- Music by: Bappi Lahiri
- Release date: 1994
- Running time: 133 min
- Country: India
- Language: Hindi

Aag Aur Chingari is a 1994 Hindi language action movie directed by Kanti Shah and starring Asrani, Shakti Kapoor, Paresh Rawal, Kiran Kumar and Ravi Kishan. The Music for the film was composed by Bappi Lahiri.

== Cast ==
- Paresh Rawal as Daku Tiranga Choudhry
- Asrani as Khairatilal
- Shakti Kapoor as Shakti Singh
- Kiran Kumar as Ghulam Ali
- Ravi Kishan as Insp Arjun Singh
- Sripradha as Alka
- Rajesh Vivek as Raghav
- Mahesh Raaj as ACP Sharma
- Shiva Rindani as Rana
- Aparjita as Ambika
- Adi Irani as Vikrant
- Pradeep Rawat as Anand

== Soundtrack ==
#	Song title	Singer
1	"Hungama Hungama Milke Karenge"	Sadhana Sargam
2	"Meri Umar Hai Solah Baras Ki"	Kavita Krishnamurthy
3	"Pyaar Loota Doon"	Suneeta Rao
4	"Tumko Mujhse Pyaar Hai"	Kumar Sanu, Alka Yagnik
5	"Yeh Jawani Hai Meri"	Kavita Krishnamurthy
