= Kiran Kumar =

Indian actor

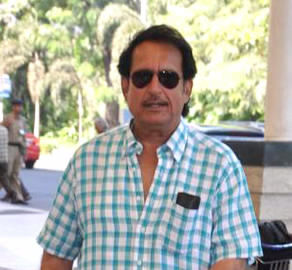
- Kiran Kumar in March 2013
- Born: Deepak Dhar; October 20, 1953 (age 73); Srinagar
- Education: Film and Television Institute of India
- Occupation: Actor
- Years active: 1960–present
- Children: 1
- Parent: Omkar Nath Dhar (father)

Kiran Kumar (October 20 1953) is an Indian screen and theatre actor. He has worked in over 300 films in Hindi, Bhojpuri and Gujarati television and film productions. He was nominated a Filmfare Award for Best Performance in a Negative Role in the film Khuda Gawah.

== Personal life ==
Kumar comes from an aristocratic Hindu Kashmiri Pandit family; his great-grandfather was a nobleman who governed the Gilgit Agency as its Wazir-e-Wazarat (lit Minister of the Ministry or Minister of the Ministers, i.e. Chief Minister) under the suzerainty of princely state of Kashmir.

His father was Omkar Nath Dhar, better known as noted Hindi film actor Jeevan.

== Career ==
=== Films ===
He attended Daly College, a boarding school in Indore, enrolled at R.D. National College in Bandra, Mumbai, and later joined the Film and Television Institute of India (FTII) in Pune.

=== Television ===
One of his first television series was with Cinevistas (Sunil Mehta, Prem Kishen). He has since established himself as a star in the Indian television industry in series such as Zindagi, Ghutan, Sahil, Manzil, Grihasti, and Katha Sagar.

== Filmography ==
List of film credits
Year	Title	Role
1960	Love in Simla	child artist Rajesh Malhotra
1963	Pyar Kiya To Darna Kya	
1970	Inspector	
1971	Do Boond Pani	Mohan Kaul
1972	Bindiya Aur Bandook	
1972	Jangal Mein Mangal	Rajesh
1973	Aaj Ki Taaza Khabar	Sunil Mehta
1973	Jalte Badan	Kiran
1973	Chalaak	Amar
1974	Thokar	Shyamu
1974	Apradhi	Inspector Shankar
1974	Azad Mohabbat	
1974	Anjaan Raahen	Gautam
1974	Mr. Romeo	Suresh Saxena
1974	Raja Kaka	
1974	Gaal Gulabi Nain Sharabi	Main leading role Taxi driver
1976	Raees	
1976	Bhoola Bhatka	Ram Shivprasad Khanna
1977	Kulvadhu	
1977	Abhi To Jee Lein	Deepak
1977	Pandit Aur Pathan	Inspector Anand
1978	Laadli	As a hero in Punjabi movie
1979	Ashaati Beej	
1980	Dhamaka	
1980	Teen Ekkey	
1981	Garvi Naar Gujaratan	
1981	Jagya Tyathi Sawaar	
1982	Kanchan Aur Ganga	
1983	Kaise Kaise Log	Verma
1984	Zakhmi Sher	
1986	Maut Ke Saudagar	
1986	Yeh Preet Na Hogi Kam	
1986	Karamdaata	Street dancer in song "Pyar tujhse hi kiya"
1987	Daraar	
1987	Khudgarz	Sudhir
1987	Kudrat Ka Kanoon	Inspector Pandey
1988	Kab Tak Chup Rahungi	
1988	Qatil	Inspector Shyam Verma
1988	Zinda Jala Doonga	
1988	Falak	Bagga
1988	Khatron Ke Khiladi	
1988	Zulm Ko Jala Doonga	Dharamdas
1988	Ganga Tere Desh Mein	Zalim Singh
1988	Hero Hiralal	Prem Kumar
1988	Tezaab	Lotiya Pathan
1988	Agnee	Sheru Menghi
1988	Rama O Rama	Sahoo dada
1989	Kala Bazaar	Jaggan Dhamaliya
1989	Mahaadev	Umesh Heera
1989	Main Tera Dushman	Inspector Kiran Kumar
1989	Hum Bhi Insaan Hain	
1989	Jurrat	Raja
1989	Boss	
1989	Ghabrahat	
1989	Khooni Murdaa	Ranjeet
1989	Na-Insaafi	Numbari Kaalia
1989	Dost	Nagendra S. Singh
1989	Paanch Paapi	Nagnath
1989	Lashkar	Sangram "Sanga" Singh
1990	Atishbaz	Tony "Tiger" Gonsalves
1990	Khatarnaak	Jaunpuriya
1990	Maha-Sangram	Vishwaraj "Vishwa"
1990	Zahreelay	Taneja
1990	C.I.D.	Roshan Lala
1990	Chor Pe Mor	Dhanpat Inderjeet Garodia "D.I.G."
1990	Aaj Ka Arjun	Lakhan
1990	Agneekaal	D.S.P. Anand Saxena
1990	Thanedaar	Thakur Azghar Singh
1990	Baaghi: A Rebel for Love	Colonel D.N. Sood
1990	Apmaan Ki Aag	Kailash
1991	Hag Toofan	
1991	Sau Crore	
1991	Shankara	Kehar Singh
1991	Roohani Taaqat	
1991	Patthar Ke Phool	Karim Khan
1991	Aaj Ka Samson	Karan Singh
1991	Khoon Ka Karz	Ramesh "Robin"
1991	Paap Ki Aandhi	Gorakh-Bade
1991	Police Ki Jung	Main Villain
1991	Afsana Pyar Ka	Mahendra Behl (Raj's Father)
1991	Inspector Balram	Sayed Mohammad Shah
1991	Do Matwale	Kasturi
1991	Henna	Ashraf
1991	Shiv Ram	
1991	Rupaye Dus Karod	
1991	Jeevan Daata	Shivram/Vishwaraj Singh
1992	Lambu Dada	Bhairav Singh
1992	Radha Ka Sangam	
1992	Daulat Ki Jung	Rana
1992	Parda Hai Parda	John Honai
1992	Tilak	
1992	Khuda Gawah	Pasha
1992	Dada	Bhairav Singh
1992	Vishwatma	Naagdansh Jurhad
1992	Adharm	Jaggan Verma
1992	Basanti Tangewali	Kapoor — Sarita's husband
1992	Jaan Se Pyaara	Jagtap Singh
1992	Bol Radha Bol	Inspector Dholakia
1992	Mashooq	Shankar Kumar
1992	Angaar	Anwar Khan
1992	Zamana	
1992	Anaam	Hyder Ali
1993	Rani Aur Maharani	Tikka
1993	Pehchaan	Yogi Shankar
1993	Bedardi	Kanhaiya/K.K./Kanya
1993	Aag Ka Toofan	Sher Singh
1993	Pyar	Rajkumar Chauhan
1993	Zakhmo Ka Hisaab	Dhaneshwar
1993	Kohra	IGP Suryakant Sharma/Mr. John
1993	Ki Shatranj	Dhogra
1993	Game	Qamaal Khan
1993	Gurudev	Bhola Pandey
1993	Phoolan Hasina Ramkali	
1993	Baaghi Sultana	
1993	Platform	Inspector Joshi
1993	Inteqam	
1993	Police Wala	Tejeshwar Choudhury
1993	Apaatkaal	Inspector Siddhu
1993	Chor Aur Chaand	Inspector Vivek
1993	Khoon Ka Sindoor	Raj Kumar
1993	Boy Friend	
1993	Aulad Ke Dushman	Raghva
1993	Shatranj	Prajapati
1993	Kasam Teri Kasam	
1994	Sholay Aur Toofan	
1994	Juaari	
1994	Gopalaa	Mahamaya B. Singh
1994	Karan	Billa
1994	Aag Aur Chingari	
1994	Eena Meena Deeka	Bhujang
1994	Ganga Aur Ranga	Police Commissioner
1994	Sangdil Sanam	Shankar Dayal Khurana
1994	Madhosh	
1994	Kanoon	Police Commissioner Kiran Shroff
1994	Anjaam	Inspector Arjun Singh
1994	Dilbar	Defending Lawyer
1994	Jazbaat	
1994	Amaanat	Rajeshwar/Lankeshwar
1994	Fauj	Thakur Yuvraj Singh
1994	Nazar Ke Samne	Advocate Sangram Singh Sahni
1995	Bewafa Sanam	Jailer Ram Prasad Shukla
1995	Guneghar	Habibullah
1995	Sauda	Pradeep Singh
1995	Hathkadi	DIG Vijaykumar
1995	Sauda	Shakti Singh
1995	Gaddaar	Economics Professor Nag
1995	Veer	Police Inspector Amar Mukhtar
1995	Ke Avtaar	Dhamu Dada
1996	Army	Jailer Raghuvir Singh
1996	Jurmana	Police Commissioner
1996	English Babu Desi Mem	Bheema Khalasi
1996	Vishwasghaat	Advocate Chhadha
1996	Aur Nagina	
1996	Himmat	Kundan
1996	Zordaar	Fox
1996	Rangbaaz	Minister
1996	Sapoot	Shamsher
1996	Ajay	Chote Raja Ranbir
1997	Salma Pe Dil Aa Gaya	Aatish Khan
1997	Kaalia	Mahesh Malhotra
1997	Judge Mujrim	D.V.M.
1997	Dil Ke Jharoke Main	Heera Pratap
1997	Auzaar	Bhai G
1997	Dil Kitna Nadan Hai	Vijaykumar Rathod aka Viju Bhai
1997	Do Ankhen Barah Hath	
1997	Ek Phool Teen Kante	
1997	Loha	Police Commissioner
1997	Krishna Arjun	Rana
1997	Qahar	Nageshwar Patel (Velji's brother)
1998	Zanjeer	
1998	Devta	
1998	Phool Bane Patthar	ACP Jaspal Choudhary
1998	Pyaar Kiya To Darna Kya	Akash Khanna
1998	Yamraaj	Officer Hamid Khan
1998	Sar Utha Ke Jiyo	Terrorist leader (Special appearance)
1998	Kudrat	Vijay's uncle
1999	Teri Mohabbat Ke Naam	Chief Police Inspector Vijay Singh
1999	Aaag Hi Aag	Police Commissioner
1999	Benaam	Jagral
1999	Sarfarosh-E-Hind	Ranjit Singh
1999	Dracula	Abdullah
1999	Gair	Sampat
2000	Bechainee	Swami Prakash Anand
2000	Apradhi Kaun	MLA Malhotra
2000	Bhutini	
2000	Jwalamukhi	Inspector (Special Appearance)
2000	Daaku Dilruba	
2000	Daku Kali Bhawani	
2000	Daku Maharani	
2000	Jallad No. 1	Inspector Arjun
2000	Khooni Shikanja	
2000	Daku Ramkali	
2000	Dhadkan	Anjali's father
2000	Woh Bewafa Thi	
2000	Shikari	Arjun Singh
2000	Daldu Chorayu Dhire Dhire	
2001	Hadh: Life on the Edge of Death	Dalal
2001	Chehra Maut Ka	
2001	Bhooka Sher	
2001	Maharaani	Inspector Jagjit Singh
2001	Dil Ne Phir Yaad Kiya	Mahendra Pratap Khanna (Rahul's dad)
2001	Aaj Ka Gunda	
2001	Hum Deewane Pyar Ke	Aslambhai
2001	Inteqam	Inspector Madhukar Shende
2001	Rupa Rani Ramkali	
2001	Galiyon Ka Badshah	
2001	Jagira	
2001	Qatil Haseeno Ka	Police Inspector
2001	Zakhmi Sherni	
2001	Yeh Raaste Hain Pyaar Ke	
2001	Kyo Kii... Main Jhuth Nahin Bolta	Khurana
2001	Dial 100	Bajaj
2001	Moksha: Salvation	Head lawyer
2002	Tum Jiyo Hazaron Saal	Mr. Kapur
2002	Ek Aur Visphot	Subedar Bhuta Singh
2002	Junoon	
2002	Aap Mujhe Achche Lagne Lage	Pratap Dholakia
2002	Yeh Hai Jalwa	Club Owner's elder brother
2002	Mujhse Dosti Karoge!	Mr. Khanna
2002	Border Kashmir	
2002	Gangobai	
2002	Jaani Dushman: Ek Anokhi Kahani	Police Inspector
2002	Dil Vil Pyar Vyar Murat	Mittal
2003	Dabdaba	Rajpal Singh
2003	Oops!	Mr. Rai
2003	Surya	Thakur's brother
2003	Humein Tumse Pyar Ho Gaya Chupke Chupke	Surendra Nath
2003	LOC: Kargil	Col. Bawa, 17 JAT
2004	Agni Pankh	Shamsher Singh Shekawat
2004	Meri Biwi Ka Jawaab Nahin	Inspector
2004	Julie	Wadhawan
2004	AK-47	
2004	Yeh Lamhe Judaai Ke	Rajpal
2005	Ho Jaata Hai Pyaar	Balwant Roy
2005	Chand Sa Roshan Chehra	Heroine's Father
2005	Revati	
2005	Chetna: The Excitement	Jairaj Mittal
2005	Dosti: Friends Forever	Thapar
2006	Sandwich	Balbir Singh
2007	Janam Janam Ke Saath	
2008	Mr. White Mr. Black	
2008	Love Has No Language	Mr. Roy
2009	Modh	
2009	Aisi Deewangi	SP Jaidev Rana
2009	Aseema: Beyond Boundaries	
2010	Barood : (The Fire) – A Love Story	Ajmaira
2010	Aaghaat	Dr. Irani, (Member of Standing Committee at Indian Medical Council, New Delhi)
2011	The Great Scientist	
2011	Love U...Mr. Kalakaar!	Chauhan
2011	Haunted House	Zombie
2011	With Love, Delhi!	Khanna
2012	Om Allah	
2013	Akaash Vani	Vani's father
2014	Bobby Jasoos	Anees Khan
2015	Ishq Ka Manjan	Doctor
2015	Brothers	Peter
2015	Sallu Ki Shaadi	Sallu's father
2015	Dikri Ne Na Koi Desho Pardesh (Gujarati)	
2017*	Sher	Villain
2017*	Dhantya Open	
2019	Have Thase Baap Re	K. K.
2019	Marrne Bhi Do Yaron	Rajkiran's Father
2019	Dosti Zindabad	
2019	Keep Safe Distance	Somnath
2021	Nyay: The Justice	
2022	The Broken News	Radhe Shyam Bansal
2022	Attack	K. V. Singh
2022	Balli Vs Birju	Balli
2022	Hawayein	Aditya's Father
2022	Maarrich	Commissioner Prasad
2022	Prem Yuddh	
2023	Bholaa	IG Jayant Malik
2023	Sukhee	Col. V.K.Gill, Sukhee's father
2024	Kaagaz 2	Chief Justice of High Court
2024	Khel Khel Mein	Vartika's Father
2025	Mission Grey House	Vikrant Rana
2026	Welcome to the Jungle	Murad Chacha

=== Television ===
List of television shows and roles
Year	Serial	Role	Channel	Notes
1986	Katha Sagar		DD National	
1986	Karan the Detective		DD National	
1988	Dharam Yuddh		DD National	
1994‍–‍1995	Aasmaan Se Aagay		DD National	
1996	Saahil	Saahil	DD Metro	
1997	Ghutan	Mr. Bedi	DD National	
1997	Bombay Blue	Mahmood	DD National	
1999	Shapath		Zee TV	
1999	Aur Phir Ek Din		Star Plus	
1999	Papa		B4U	
2002	Aryamaan	Mahaan Hoshin (Aryamaan's guru)	DD National	
2002	Kittie Party	Manoviraj	Zee TV	
2003	Karan The Detective	Karan Detective	DD National	
2003	Saara Akaash	AOC Suraj Singh	Star Plus	
2003	Ehsaas		DD National	
2003	Aandhi	Diwan Singh	Zee TV	
2004	Zameen Se Aassman Tak	Balraj Thakur	Sahara One	
2005‍–‍2006	Miilee	Vishal Rastogi	Star Plus	
2006	Agneepath	Vishal Mehra	DD National	
2006	Vaidehi	Harshvardhan "Harsh" Jaisingh	Sony TV	
2006	Viraasat	Raman Lamba	STAR One	
2007‍–‍2009	Maryada	Veer Pratap Singh	DD National	
2008	Waaris	Ganesh Shetty	Zee TV	
2008	Grihasti	Balraj Khurana	Star Plus	
2011	Chhajje Chhajje Ka Pyaar	Avtaar Sehgal	Sony TV	
2011	Lakhon Mein Ek		Star Plus	
2011‍–‍2012	Mangalsutra - Ek Maryada	DD National		
2016‍–‍2017	Sanyukt	Govardhan Mehta	Zee TV	
2017‍–‍2019	Yeh Un Dinon Ki Baat Hai	Jaiprakash Dinanath Maheshwari	Sony TV	
2018	Prithvi Vallabh	Sabuktigin	Sony TV	
2026	Seth Pannalal Ki Baradari	Avtar	DD National	

- Aashiana - DD National
- Army - DD National
- Manzil - DD National
- Zindagi - DD National

== Awards and nominations ==
- Filmfare Award for Best Performance in Negative Role (1992) (nominated for Khuda Gawah)
- Mayor's Award, for Ghutan
- Mayor's Award, for Aur Phir ek Din
