= List of songs recorded by Alka Yagnik =

Songs by Alka Yagnik

The following is a list of songs sung by singer Alka Yagnik:

== 1980s ==
=== 1980 ===
Film	No	Song	Composer(s)	Writer(s)	Co-artist(s)
Payal Ki Jhankaar	1	"Thirkat Aang Lachki Jhuki"	Raj Kamal	Maya Govind	solo

=== 1981 ===
Film	No	Song	Composer(s)	Writer(s)	Co-artist(s)
Hotel	2	"Dekho Pyaar Mein Aisa Nahin Karte"	Usha Khanna	Indeevar	Amit Kumar
Itni Si Baat	3	"Ek Ladki Roz"	Kalyanji-Anandji	Anjaan	Amit Kumar
Itni Si Baat	4	"He Natnagar"	Kalyanji-Anandji	Anjaan	Hemlata
Lawaaris	5	"Mere Angane Mein"	Kalyanji-Anandji	Anjaan	solo
Roohie	6	"Roohie Meri Roohie"	Kalyanji-Anandji	Indeevar	solo
Sannata	7	"Sun Jaane Jaa"	Rajesh Roshan	Majrooh Sultanpuri	Udit Narayan
Sannata	8	"Superman Superman"	Rajesh Roshan	Majrooh Sultanpuri	Udit Narayan, Ursula Vaz
Ye Rishta Na Toote	9	"Chor Kare Chori To"	Kalyanji-Anandji	Anjaan	Manhar Udhas
Ye Rishta Na Toote	10	"Ye Rishta Na Toote"	Kalyanji-Anandji	Maya Govind	Manhar Udhas

=== 1982 ===
Film	No	Song	Composer(s)	Writer(s)	Co-artist(s)
Anmol Sitaare	11	"Choron Ko Pakadne Ham Chale Hain"	Nadeem-Shravan	Kavi Pradeep	Amit Kumar, Preeti Sagar, Sapna Mukherjee, Vinay Mandke
Anmol Sitaare	12	"Ye Duniya Hai Natakshala"	Nadeem-Shravan	Kavi Pradeep	Amit Kumar, Shabbir Kumar
Anmol Sitaare	13	"You Don't Know What We Are"	Nadeem-Shravan	Kavi Pradeep	Amit Kumar, Preeti Sagar, Anwar, Dilraj Kaur
Anokha Bandhan	14	"Tu Itani Door Kyun Hai Maa"	Usha Khanna	Nida Fazli	solo
Badle Ki Aag	15	"Jawani Mein Aate Hai"	Laxmikant-Pyarelal	Verma Malik	Suresh Wadkar, Asha Bhosle
Hamari Bahu Alka	16	"Pakka Jamun Todo Nahin"	Rajesh Roshan	Yogesh Gaud	Penaz Masani
Hamari Bahu Alka	17	"Hum Tum Rahenge Akele"	Rajesh Roshan	Amit Khannaa	Amit Kumar
Jeevan Dhaara	18	"Jaldise Aana"	Laxmikant-Pyarelal	Anand Bakshi	Anuradha Paudwal
Kaamchor	19	"Tum Se Badhkar Duniya Mein"	Rajesh Roshan	Indeevar	Kishore Kumar
Khush Naseeb	20	"Dil Dil Se Tha Anjaana"	Kalyanji-Anandji	Anjaan	Amit Kumar
Maine Jeena Sikh Liya	21	"Sasurji Mile Hain"	Nadeem-Shravan	Anwar Sagar	Shailendra Singh
Maine Jeena Sikh Liya	22	"Kal Shaam Ko Milenge"	Nadeem-Shravan	Anwar Sagar	Shailendra Singh
Namkeen	23	"Aisa Laga Koi Surma Najar Maa"	R. D. Burman	Gulzar	solo
Rustom	24	"Gol Gol Duniya Hai"	Kalyanji-Anandji	Indeevar	Hemlata
Rustom	25	"Pyaar Karnewalon Ko"	Kalyanji-Anandji	Indeevar	Mahendra Kapoor, Shailendra Singh
Sun Sajna	26	"Sun Chanve"	Raamlaxman	Ravinder Rawal	solo
Teri Maang Sitaaron Se Bhar Doon	27	"Lo Mera Naam"	Laxmikant-Pyarelal	Anand Bakshi	Suresh Wadkar
Teri Maang Sitaaron Se Bhar Doon	28	"Pehli Nazar Mein"	Laxmikant-Pyarelal	Anand Bakshi	Amit Kumar
Vidhaata	29	"Saat Sahelia Khadi Khadi"	Kalyanji-Anandji	Anand Bakshi	Hemlata, Kishore Kumar, Anuradha Paudwal, Sadhana Sargam, Shivangi Kolhapure, Padmini Kolhapure, Kanchan
Zakhmee Insaan	30	"Dhoka Khana Nahi"	Nadeem-Shravan	Gauhar Kanpuri	Vinay Mandke, Fetty Fernanades

=== 1983 ===
Film	No	Song	Composer(s)	Writer(s)	Co-artist(s)
Agent 123	31	"Aao Aao Yeh Dekho To"	S. N. Tripathi	B. D. Mishra	Suresh Wadkar
Avtaar	32	"Zindagi Mauj Udane Ka"	Laxmikant-Pyarelal	Anand Bakshi	Mahendra Kapoor, Suresh Wadkar
Bechara	33	"O Sanam Mere Sanam"	Ameen-Sangeet	Mukhtar	Anup Jalota
Bekhabar	34	"Gori Pareshan"	Usha Khanna	Sameer	solo
Chor Mandli	35	"Maine Tujhko Sada Chaha Hai"	Kalyanji-Anandji	G. L. Rawal	Anwar
Chor Mandli	36	"Maine Tujhko Sada Chaha Hai" (sad)	Kalyanji-Anandji	G. L. Rawal	Anwar
Coolie	37	"Mujhe Peene Ka Shock Nahin"	Laxmikant-Pyarelal	Anand Bakshi	Shabbir Kumar
Ghungroo	38	"Jo Safar Pyaar Se"	Kalyanji-Anandji	Prakash Mehra	Udit Narayan
Kaun Hai Woh	39	"Haye Allah Yeh Mard Hai Kaise"	Kamal Kant	Asad Bhopali	Anuradha Paudwal
Kaun Hai Woh	40	"Jai Jai Note Hare"	Kamal Kant	Jalal Jhansvi	Anuradha Paudwal
Kaun Hai Woh	41	"Main Kolhapur Ki Long Marchi"	Kamal Kant	Asad Bhopali	solo
Main Awara Hoon	42	"Bolo Ji Kaisi Kahi"	R. D. Burman	Anand Bakshi	Kishore Kumar
Nastik	43	"Sagre Jagat Ka Ek Rakhwala"	Kalyanji-Anandji	Anand Bakshi	Sadhana Sargam
Pyaar Bina Jag Soona	44	"Naam Se Kya Kaam"	Usha Khanna	Asad Bhopali	Suresh Wadkar
Pyaar Bina Jag Soona	45	"Pyaar Bina Jag Soona"	Usha Khanna	Abhilash	Suresh Wadkar
Raaste Aur Rishte	46	"So Jaa Munne"	Usha Khanna	Yogesh	solo
Shekhar Mera Naam	47	"Balam Billu"	D. S. Reuben	N/A	solo
Talabandi	48	"Kitna Tu Bhola Hai"	Bablu Dheeraj	Sameer	solo
Talabandi	49	"Ladki Fasane Ke"	Bablu Dheeraj	Sameer	solo
Taqdeer	50	"Tu Hi Banaye Taqdeer Mera"	Kalyanji-Anandji	Anjaan	Purushotham Upadhyay

=== 1984 ===
Film	No	Song	Composer(s)	Writer(s)	Co-artist(s)
Aa Jao Ghar Tumhara	51	"Hato Jao Chhedo Na"	Kalyanji-Anandji	Maya Govind	solo
All Rounder	52	"Logo Logo Suno"	Laxmikant-Pyarelal	Anand Bakshi	Anuradha Paudwal, Amit Kumar, Mahendra Kapoor
All Rounder	53	"Mere Kurte Mein"	Laxmikant-Pyarelal	Anand Bakshi	Suresh Wadkar
Dharm Aur Qanoon	54	"Bade Door Se Aaye Hain"	Kalyanji-Anandji	Farooq Kaiser	Kishore Kumar, Manhar Udhas
Ek Misaal	55	"Bewafa Kehke Unko"	Manoj-Gyan	Manoj Bhatnagar	solo
Ek Misaal	56	"Bewafa Kehke Unko" (sad)	Manoj-Gyan	Manoj Bhatnagar	solo
Ek Misaal	57	"Diljalon Ki Kahaniyan"	Manoj-Gyan	Manoj Bhatnagar	solo
Ghar Ek Mandir	58	"Ooi Ooi Main Mar Gayi"	Laxmikant-Pyarelal	Anand Bakshi	Shailendra Singh
Kunwari Bahu	59	"Hamen Tumse"	Usha Khanna	Nida Fazli	Shailendra Singh
Lakhon Ki Baat	60	"Qismat Khul Gayi Re"	Manas Mukherjee	Yogesh	Shakti Thakur
Lakhon Ki Baat	61	"Phir Mujhe Pyaar Se Dekhiye"	Manas Mukherjee	Yogesh	solo
Love Marriage	62	"Beeswin Sadi Ke"	Anu Malik	Hasrat Jaipuri	Amit Kumar
Maang Saja Di Meri	63	"Shaadi Kara Do Meri"	Laxmikant-Pyarelal	Anjaan	Suresh Wadkar
Naseeb Ki Baat	64	"Gori Pareshan"	Shankar–Jaikishan	Anjaan	Dilraj Kaur, Chandrani Mukherjee
Purana Mandir	65	"Hum Jis Pe Marte The"	Ajit Singh	Amit Khanna	solo
Raaj Tilak	66	"Aa Gaye Ek Nahi Do Nahi Nahi Te"	Kalyanji-Anandji	Verma Malik	Sadhana Sargam, Anuradha Paudwal, Kishore Kumar
Raaj Tilak	67	"Julm Ho Gaya Re Julam Ho Gaya (Ujade Hue Gulshan)"	Kalyanji-Anandji	Verma Malik	Sadhana Sargam, Kishore Kumar
Rakta Bandhan	68	"Pyaar Chahiye" (female)	Usha Khanna	Indeevar	solo
Rakta Bandhan	69	"Sare Bazaar"	Usha Khanna	Indeevar	solo
Rakta Bandhan	70	"Shaukh Haseena"	Usha Khanna	Indeevar	solo
Sardaar	71	"Meri Akhiyan Vich Punjab"	Usha Khanna	Nida Fazli	Suresh Wadkar
Shapath	72	"Hoshiyar"	Bappi Lahiri	Farooq Kaiser	Chandrani Mukherjee
Tere Mere Beech Mein	73	"Ganga Tohri Ghaat Pe"	Raam Laxman	Dada Kondke	Mahendra Kapoor
Tere Mere Beech Mein	74	"Teri Le Loon Bahein"	Raam Laxman	Dada Kondke	Mahendra Kapoor
Tere Mere Beech Mein	75	"Roop Tera Sundar"	Raam Laxman	Rajesh Majumdar	solo
Yahan Wahan	76	"Koi Nahin Aap Hamare"	Kalyanji-Anandji	Indeevar	solo
Yahan Wahan	77	"Kya Koi Aur Hai"	Kalyanji-Anandji	Indeevar	Suresh Wadkar
Yahan Wahan	78	"Poochho Poochho Zara"	Kalyanji-Anandji	Indeevar	Suresh Wadkar
Zakhmi Sher	79	"Dhakchiki Dhakchiki"	Laxmikant-Pyarelal	Santosh Anand	Usha Mangeshkar

=== 1985 ===
Film	No	Song	Composer(s)	Writer(s)	Co-artist(s)
Aaj Ka Dada	80	"Khilti Kali Ye Roop Hai Tera"	Ilaiyaraaja	Brij Bihari	Shailendra Singh
Aaj Ka Dada	81	"Sanson Mein Sargam"	Ilaiyaraaja	Brij Bihari	solo
Aaj Ka Daur	82	"Petrol Bharo"	Bappi Lahiri	Indeevar	Kishore Kumar
Babu	83	"Yeh Mera Jeevan" (duet)	Rajesh Roshan	Majrooh Sultanpuri	Kishore Kumar
Babu	84	"Yeh Mera Jeevan" (female)	Rajesh Roshan	Majrooh Sultanpuri	solo
Bhagwan Shri Krishna	85	"Mata Yashoda"	Avinash Vyas	Ramkumar Bohra	solo
Bhagwan Shri Krishna	86	"Ek Aya Re Gwala"	Avinash Vyas	Ramkumar Bohra	solo
Bhagwan Shri Krishna	87	"Ek Natwar Natkhat"	Avinash Vyas	Ramkumar Bohra	Mahendra Kapoor
Bhagwan Shri Krishna	88	"Rang Dalo Na"	Avinash Vyas	Ramkumar Bohra	Mahendra Kapoor
Bhagwan Shri Krishna	89	"Maiya Mori"	Avinash Vyas	Meerabai	Gaurang Vyas
Cheekh	90	"Dekho Dekho Dekho"	Nadeem-Shravan	Hasrat Jaipuri	solo
Durgaa	91	"Hai Chanji"	Sonik-Omi	Verma Malik	solo
Ek Daku Saher Mein	92	"Humnasheen Bahot Aage"	Rajesh Roshan	Majrooh Sultanpuri	Kishore Kumar
Fauladi Takkar	93	"Meri Natni Ka"	Kamal Kant		solo
Fauladi Takkar	94	"Apne Piya Se"	Kamal Kant		Shabbir Kumar
Ghar Dwaar	95	"Swaarg Se Sundar"	Chitragupta	Anjaan	Suresh Wadkar, Poornima, Chandrani Mukherjee
Ghar Dwaar	96	"Baaja Baja"	Chitragupta	Anjaan	Shabbir Kumar
Ghar Dwaar	97	"Hum Na Jaibe Balam"	Chitragupta	Anjaan	solo
Mahasati Tulsi	98	"O Mere Shyam"	S. N. Tripathi	N/A	solo
Mahasati Tulsi	99	"Pehli Pehli Raat"	S. N. Tripathi	N/A	solo
Mahasati Tulsi	100	"Pehli Pehli Raat" (version 2)	S. N. Tripathi	N/A	solo
Maut Ka Badla Maut	101	"Disco Disco Disco"	Satyam, D. S. Reuben	Brij Bihari	solo
Maut Ka Badla Maut	102	"Yeh Jaan Gayi Dilwalon"	Satyam, D. S. Reuben	Brij Bihari	solo
Mera Jawab	103	"Main Hoon Haseena"	Laxmikant-Pyarelal	Santosh Anand	Laxmikant Shantaram Kudalkar
Paisa Yeh Paisa	104	"Jis Dil Mein Pyar" (version 2)	Usha Khanna	M. G. Hashmat	Manhar Udhas
Paththar	105	"Khol Mera Tala"	Raam Laxman	Naqsh Lyallpuri	solo
Paththar Dil	106	"Ato Mein Jo"	Laxmikant-Pyarelal	Sudarshan Fakir	Sulakshana Pandit, Shailendra Singh, Nitin Mukesh
Pighalta Aasman	107	"Humse Na Sahi"	Kalyanji–Anandji	Indeevar	Sadhana Sargam
Pighalta Aasman	108	"Jab Yeh Dil Ho Jawan"	Kalyanji–Anandji	Anjaan	Sadhana Sargam
Pighalta Aasman	109	"Teri Meri Prem Kahani"	Kalyanji–Anandji	Maya Govind	Kishore Kumar
Sarfarosh	110	"Saare Shehar Ke Sharabi"	Laxmikant-Pyarelal	Anand Bakshi	Laxmikant, Anuradha Paudwal
Yeh Kaisa Farz	111	"Hato Dupatta Chhod Do"	Raam Laxman	Indeevar	solo
Yudh	112	"Yudh Kar"	Kalyanji Anandji	Anand Bakshi	Amit Kumar
Yudh	113	"Doston Tum Sabko"	Kalyanji Anandji	Anand Bakshi	Shailendra Singh

=== 1986 ===
Film	No	Song	Composer(s)	Writer(s)	Co-artist(s)
Anubhav	114	"Tere Naino Ne"	Rajesh Roshan	Sameer	S. P. Balasubrahmanyam
Baat Ban Jaye	115	"Yahoo Mere Dil Mein"	Kalyanji-Anandji		Kishore Kumar
Bud Kaar	116	"Ankh Se Chalka Ansoo"	Usha Khanna	Prayag Raj	solo
Bud Kaar	117	"Babul Ka Ghar"	Usha Khanna	Prayag Raj	solo
Bud Kaar	118	"Oye Mere Thanedara"	Usha Khanna	Prayag Raj	solo
Bud Naseeb	119	"Azaad Mulk Ka Kissa"	Ajay Swamy	Vishweshwar Sharma	solo
Bud Naseeb	120	"Chah Jo Dil Mein"	Ajay Swamy	Vishweshwar Sharma	solo
Bud Naseeb	121	"Tamso Ma Jyotir"	Ajay Swamy	Vishweshwar Sharma	solo
Bud Naseeb	122	"Main Tumhe Phool Kahoon"	Ajay Swamy	Qaiser Ul Jafri	Suresh Wadkar
Chambal Ka Badshah	123	"Pyaaar Mein Jo Jo Hota Hai"	Sonik-Omi	Verma Malik	Suresh Wadkar
Chameli Ki Shaadi	124	"Pina Haram Hai"	Kalyanji-Anandji	Prakash Mehra	Kishore Kumar
Ek Aur Sikander	125	"Hai Maa Khuda"	Rajesh Roshan	Majrooh Sultanpuri	Kishore Kumar
Ek Aur Sikander	126	"Dhadka Dil Dil"	Rajesh Roshan	Majrooh Sultanpuri	Kishore Kumar
Ghar Sansar	127	"Jeevan Ke Raste Mein"	Rajesh Roshan	Indeevar	Kishore Kumar, Mohammed Aziz
Ghar Sansar	128	"Mere Ghar Mein"	Rajesh Roshan	Indeevar	Hemlata
Ghar Sansar	129	"Meri Oonchi Nahi"	Rajesh Roshan	Indeevar	Hemlata
Haathon Ki Lakeeren	130	"Rone Se Bichhde Yaar"	Pyare Mohan	Hasan Kamaal	Bela Sulakhe
Izzat Aabroo	131	"Aaya Hai Baharon"	Ajay Swami	Vishweshwar Sharma	solo
Jawani Ki Kahani	132	"Dil Mein Kuchh Kuchh"	Usha Khanna	Yogesh	Vijay Benedict
Jawani Ki Kahani	133	"Meri Subah Hai Udaas"	Usha Khanna	Yogesh	solo
Jhanjhaar	134	"Badha Haath Aage"	Kalyanji-Anandji	Vishwamitra Adil	Suresh Wadkar
Kaanch Ki Deewar	135	"Ari O Sakhi"	Shankar–Jaikishan	Kafil Azar	Chandrani Mukherjee, Dilraj Kaur, Sharda, Anuradha Paudwal
Karamdaata	136	"Meri Zindagi Hai Ye Sone Ka (Sad)"	Anu Malik		
Karamdaata	137	"Dupatta Tumhara"	Anu Malik		Shabbir Kumar
Mera Haque	138	"Chal Dhobi Ghat"	Anu Malik	Indeevar	Anu Malik
Mera Haque	139	"Kaala Kauwa"	Anu Malik	Indeevar	Kishore Kumar
Mohabbat Ki Kasam	140	"Ae Rabba Rabba"	Kamal Kant	Kulwant Jani	Shabbir Kumar
Mohabbat Ki Kasam	141	"Dil Ka Tarana"	Kamal Kant	Kulwant Jani	Shabbir Kumar
Mohabbat Ki Kasam	142	"Jisne Sharab Pi"	Kamal Kant	Kulwant Jani	Mahendra Kapoor
Nasihat	143	"Tum Bahon Haseen"	Kalyanji-Anandji	Kaifi Azmi	Kishore Kumar
Nasihat	144	"Jhunak Jhunak"	Kalyanji-Anandji	Anjaan	Kishore Kumar
Naya Naya Pyar	145	"O Jaani"	Kalyanji-Anandji	Anjaan	solo
Pahuche Huwey Log	146	"De De Tu Signal"	Kalyanji-Anandji		Amit Kumar
Pattharon Ka Shaher	147	"Do Dooni Char"	Iqbal Qureshi	G. P. Sateesh	Rajkumar
Pattharon Ka Shaher	148	"Hoon Zameen Pe"	Iqbal Qureshi		Rajkumar
Prem Jaal	149	"O Chacha Chachi"	Kalyanji-Anandji	M. G. Hashmat	Manhar Udhas
Pyar Ho Gaya	150	"Dekh Kabse Main Aake Khadi"	Dhiraj Dhanak	Janak Vyas	
Pyar Ho Gaya	151	"Dil Dil Dil"	Dhiraj Dhanak	Janak Vyas	Shabbir Kumar
Pyar Ho Gaya	152	"I Love You"	Dhiraj Dhanak	Janak Vyas	Shabbir Kumar
Pyar Ho Gaya	153	"I Love You" (version 2)	Dhiraj Dhanak	Janak Vyas	Shabbir Kumar
Pyar Ho Gaya	154	"Aap Ki Kasam"	Dhiraj Dhanak	Abhilash	Shabbir Kumar
Pyar Ho Gaya	155	"Hum Is Paar"	Dhiraj Dhanak	Shaily Shailendra	Shabbir Kumar
Qatil Aur Ashiq	156	"Garma Garam Meri Jawani"	Nadeem-Shravan	Anwar Sagar	Vinay Mandke
Seepeeyan	157	"Maun Titli"	Raghunath Seth		solo
Swati	158	"Shaadu Mubarak"	Laxmikant-Pyarelal	Anand Bakshi	Anuradha Paudwal
Tan-Badan	159	"Kisiko Main Aisi Lagti Hoon"	Anand–Milind	Sameer	solo
Tan-Badan	160	"Biwi Husband Ko"	Anand–Milind	Sameer	Suresh Wadkar
Veer Bhimsen	161	"Mera Man Hansa Re"	Gaurang Vyas	Kavi Pradeep	solo
Veer Bhimsen	162	"Suno Suno Hey Atal Himalaya"	Gaurang Vyas	Kavi Pradeep	solo
Veer Bhimsen	163	"Are Lut Gayi Lut Gayi"	Gaurang Vyas	Kavi Pradeep	solo
Vikram Betaal	164	"Naache Jawaani"	Nadeem-Shravan	Indeevar	Anuradha Paudwal

=== 1987 ===
Film	No	Song	Composer(s)	Writer(s)	Co-artist(s)
Aage Mod Hai	165	"Ab To Bhula Do"	Raghunath Seth	Ravi Misra	Dilraj Kaur
Badla Naagin Ka	166	"Bache Suhag Mera"	Sonik-Omi	Brij Bihari, Kavi Pradeep	Dilraj Kaur
Badla Naagin Ka	167	"Teri Pooja"	Sonik-Omi	Brij Bihari, Kavi Pradeep	solo
Banoo	168	"Aa Jaa Re Mitwa Re"	Shambhu Sen		Mohammed Aziz
Daku Hasina	169	"Ang Jale Gora Rang Jale"	Usha Khanna	Mahender Dalvi	Suresh Wadkar
Daku Rani Talwarwali	170	"Kachi Kali Hoon Main"	Sonik-Omi	Brij Bihari	Mohammed Aziz
Daku Rani Talwarwali	171	"Main Hoon Galiyon Ki Rani"	Sonik-Omi	Brij Bihari	solo
Dharti Ki Kasam	172	"Jab Kuch Na Mila"	Usha Khanna	Indeevar	Vinod Chauhan
Dharti Ki Kasam	173	"Mitti Ka Madhav Mila"	Usha Khanna	Indeevar	Mohammed Aziz
Ghar Ka Sukh	174	"Janejan Kehke Bulaya"	Ravi	Ravi	Suresh Wadkar
Ghar Ka Sukh	175	"Bolree Jethani"	Ravi	Ravi	Anuradha Paudwal
Hiraasat	176	"Har Aadmi Ko Biwi Ka"	Kalyanji-Anandji	Vishweshwar Sharma	Kishore Kumar
Hukumat	177	"Duniya Mein Kuch Rahega To" (version 1)	Laxmikant-Pyarelal	Verma Malik	Kavita Krishnamurthy, Mohammed Aziz
Hukumat	178	"Duniya Mein Kuch Rahega To" (version 2)	Laxmikant-Pyarelal	Verma Malik	Mohammed Aziz
Hukumat	179	"Duniya Mein Kuch Rahega To" (version 3)	Laxmikant-Pyarelal	Verma Malik	Mohammed Aziz
Hukumat	180	"Ram Ram Bol Prabhu"	Laxmikant-Pyarelal	Verma Malik	Shabbir Kumar, Kavita Krishnamurthy
Imaandaar	181	"Mitwa Tu Hai Kahan"	Kalyanji-Anandji	Prakash Mehra, Maya Govind	Suresh Wadkar, Sadhana Sargam
Jaan Hatheli Pe	182	"Main Ek Ladki Hoon"	Laxmikant-Pyarelal	Anjaan	solo
Jalwa	183	"Didi Mera Kar De Kshama"	Anand–Milind	Narendra Sharma	solo
Jalwa	184	"Is Jadoo Ki Dande Mein"	Anand–Milind	Gulshan Bawra	Remo Fernandes
Kali Dada	185	"Aankhon Mein Nasha Hai"	Bappi Lahiri	Brij Bihari	Suresh Wadkar
Kali Dada	186	"Aasmaan O Aasmaan"	Bappi Lahiri	Brij Bihari	Suresh Wadkar
Kali Dada	187	"Shambho Shiv Shambho"	Bappi Lahiri	Brij Bihari	Suresh Wadkar
Kali Dada	188	"Aao Aao Pyaar Karo"	Bappi Lahiri	Brij Bihari	Suresh Wadkar
Kisaan	189	"Ho Gayee Ho Gayee Main Jawan"	Manjeet Arora		solo
Kudrat Ka Kanoon	190	"Mukhda Chaand Ka Tukda"	Laxmikant-Pyarelal	Sameer	solo
Loha	191	"Tu Ladki Number One"	Laxmikant-Pyarelal	Farooq Kaiser	Shabbir Kumar
Maa Beti	192	"So Jaa Meri Gudiya"	Anand–Milind	Anjaan	solo
Maa Beti	193	"Bani Re Meri Bitiya"	Anand–Milind	Anjaan	Shabbir Kumar, Shailendra Singh
Maa Beti	194	"Kal Ki Baat Kahu"	Anand–Milind	Maya Govind	solo
Maa Beti	195	"Mere Ghar Dwaar Ko"	Anand–Milind	Anjaan	solo
Mard Ki Zabaan	196	"Are Hoti Jo Main Bijli"	Laxmikant-Pyarelal	Farooq Kaiser	solo
Mard Ki Zabaan	197	"Humne Jo Bhi Tumko"	Laxmikant-Pyarelal	Indeevar	Kishore Kumar
Mard Ki Zabaan	198	"Samajh Samajh Kar"	Laxmikant-Pyarelal	S. H. Bihari	Manhar Udhas
Mera Lahoo	199	"Main Hoon Ek Bansuri"	Anu Malik	Kulwant Jani	solo
Mera Lahoo	200	"Ye Lo Kaagaz"	Anu Malik	Anwar Sagar	Shabbir Kumar
Naam O Nishan	201	"O Tera Naam Kya Hai"	Anu Malik	Indeevar	Kishore Kumar
Param Dharam	202	"Allah Jab Se"	Bappi Lahiri	Anjaan	Mohammed Aziz
Superman	203	"Raat Ho To Aisi"	Kamal Kant	Kulwant Jani, Asad Bhopali	solo
Thikana	204	"Thoda Sa Gham"	Kalyanji-Anandji	Anjaan	solo

=== 1988 ===
Film	No	Song	Composer(s)	Writer(s)	Co-artist(s)
7 Bijliyan	205	"Dekho Chal Padi"	Usha Khanna	Yogesh	Usha Khanna, Parvati Khan, Kalyani Mitra
7 Bijliyan	206	"Dekho Chal Padi Hum" (version 2)	Usha Khanna	Yogesh	Usha Khanna, Parvati Khan, Kalyani Mitra
Aag Ke Sholay	207	"Hum Tumhe Na Denge Vote"	Divya Davda	Khalid	Amit Kumar, Vijayta Pandit, Shabbir Kumar
Aag Ke Sholay	208	"Ho Raam Raam Japna"	Divya Davda	Khalid	Anuradha Paudwal
Aag Ke Sholay	209	"Bas Mein Nahin"	Divya Davda	Khalid	solo
Afsar	210	"Aaina Hoon"	Kalyanji-Anandji	Anjaan	Nitin Mukesh
Afsar	211	"Itt Jaaun"	Kalyanji-Anandji	Anjaan	Sadhana Sargam
Afsar	212	"Mehfil Mein Teri Aana"	Kalyanji-Anandji	Anjaan	solo
Afsar	213	"Mausam Hai Pyara"	Kalyanji-Anandji	Anjaan	Suresh Wadkar
Agnee	214	"Mil Gaye Dil Ab To"	Laxmikant-Pyarelal	Anand Bakshi	Mohammed Aziz
Agnee	215	"Nachlo Taplo"	Laxmikant-Pyarelal	Anand Bakshi	Mohammed Aziz
Agnee	216	"Main Na Pyaar Karoongi"	Laxmikant-Pyarelal	Anand Bakshi	solo
Agnee	217	"Kahaan Laya Hai Mera Yaar"	Laxmikant-Pyarelal	Anand Bakshi	Suresh Wadkar
Aurat Teri Yehi Kahani	218	"Hamara Jobanava"	Anand–Milind	Mahender Dalvi	Kavita Krishnamurthy
Aurat Teri Yehi Kahani	219	"Baar Baar Mere Pyar Se"	Anand–Milind	Mahender Dalvi	solo
Aurat Teri Yehi Kahani	220	"Naam Pe Rasmon Ke Ye Aurat"	Anand–Milind	Mahender Dalvi	solo
Aurat Teri Yehi Kahani	221	Raat Bhar Rahiyo"	Anand–Milind	Rajendra Krishan	solo
Aurat Teri Yehi Kahani	222	Sapera Bin Bajayega"	Anand–Milind	Rajendra Krishan	solo
Aurat Teri Yehi Kahani	223	"Holi Aayee Re"	Anand–Milind	Rajendra Krishan	Suresh Wadkar
Aurat Teri Yehi Kahani	224	"Ye Sach Hai Na Jhooth Hai"	Anand–Milind	Rajendra Krishan	Suresh Wadkar
Bahaar	225	"Humsafar Ban Ke"	Manoj-Gyan	Naqsh Lyallpuri	Suresh Wadkar
Bahaar	226	"Tumko Jabse Kareeb Dekha"	Manoj-Gyan	Naqsh Lyallpuri	Bhupinder Singh
Biwi Ho To Aisi	227	"Main Hoon Paanwali"	Laxmikant-Pyarelal	Anjaan	solo
Biwi Ho To Aisi	228	"Mere Dulhe Raja"	Laxmikant-Pyarelal	Sameer	solo
Biwi Ho To Aisi	229	"Main Tere Ho Gaya"	Laxmikant-Pyarelal	Hasan Kamaal	Mohammed Aziz
Charnon Ki Saugandh	230	"Aaja Aaja Mere Mithu Miyan"	Laxmikant-Pyarelal		solo
Charnon Ki Saugandh	231	"Chal Sair Gulshan Ki Tujhko Karaoon"	Laxmikant-Pyarelal		Kishore Kumar
Charnon Ki Saugandh	232	"Nariyan Shahar Ki Nariyan"	Laxmikant-Pyarelal		Kishore Kumar
Dayavan	233	"Kahe Saiyan Teri Meri Baat"	Laxmikant-Pyarelal	Aziz Qaisi	Kavita Krishnamurthy
Falak	234	"Pyaar Kiya Tab"	Kalyanji-Anandji	Anjaan	Amit Kumar
Geeta Ki Saugandh	235	"Jaan Mein Hai Jaan"	Anwar-Usman	Mahender Dalvi	Sadhana Sargam
Geeta Ki Saugandh	236	"Jaan Mein Hai Jaan" (sad)	Anwar-Usman	Mahender Dalvi	Sadhana Sargam
Ghar Ghar Ki Kahani	237	"Dulhe Raja Ki Soorat Dekho"	Bappi Lahiri		Usha Mangeshkar
Ghunghat	238	"Mere Dulhe Raja Ki"	Lakshman Shahabadi	Lakshman Shahabadi	solo
Ghunghat	239	"Lakhon Ke Bol Sahungi"	Lakshman Shahabadi	Lakshman Shahabadi	solo
Ghunghat	240	"Lakhon Ke Bol Sahungi" (sad)	Lakshman Shahabadi	Lakshman Shahabadi	solo
Hamara Khandan	241	"Dilbar Jaani"	Laxmikant-Pyarelal	Farooq Kaiser	Shabbir Kumar
Insaaf Ki Manzil	242	"O Re Piya Tumhi Ko Dil Diya"	Chitragupta	Mithilesh Sinha	solo
Insaaf Ki Manzil	243	"Sanyia Sautaniya Ke Ghar Gaye"	Chitragupta	Mithilesh Sinha	Suresh Wadkar
Insaaf Ki Manzil	244	"Gori Sapno Mein Hai"	Chitragupta	Mithilesh Sinha	Suresh Wadkar
Janam Janam	245	"Kahe Dag Mag Teri"	Laxmikant-Pyarelal	S. H. Bihari	Solo
Jazira	246	"Yeh Kunwarapan"	Kirti-Anuraag	Ram Siddharth	Suresh Wadkar
Kab Tak Chup Rahungi	247	"Dil Todke Na Jaiyo"	Bappi Lahiri	Anjaan	solo
Khatron Ke Khiladi	248	"Hum Dono Mein"	Laxmikant-Pyarelal	Anand Bakshi	Kishore Kumar
Khoon Baha Ganga Mein	249	"Khel Gaya Mera Jeevan"	Anand–Milind	Anand Bakshi	Suresh Wadkar
Khoon Baha Ganga Mein	250	"Koi Dekhe Mujhe To"	Anand–Milind	Anand Bakshi	solo
Khoon Baha Ganga Mein	251	"Yeh Bachpan Ka Pyaar"	Anand–Milind	Anand Bakshi	Kavita Krishnamurthy
Khoon Baha Ganga Mein	252	"Yeh Bachpan Ka Pyaar" (sad)	Anand–Milind	Anand Bakshi	Suresh Wadkar
Mar Mitenge	253	"Mar Mitenge Ya"	Laxmikant-Pyarelal	Anand Bakshi	Mohammed Aziz, Anuradha Paudwal, Shailendra Singh
Mera Muqaddar	254	"Tune Sanam Kya Kiya"	Kamal Kant	Kulwant Jani	solo
Mera Muqaddar	255	"Maiya Mera Muqaddar"	Kamal Kant	Verma Malik	Suresh Wadkar, Surinder Shinda
Mera Muqaddar	256	"Mausam Hai Bheega Bheega Re"	Kamal Kant	Kulwant Jani	Shabbir Kumar
Mera Muqaddar	257	"Chitthi Aye Gaye Babu"	Kamal Kant	Anjaan	Kavita Krishnamurthy, Mohammed Aziz
Mohabbat Ke Dushman	258	"O Jaanu Meri"	Kalyanji-Anandji	Prakash Mehra	Suresh Wadkar
Mohabbat Ke Dushman	259	"Na Teer Se Maro"	Kalyanji-Anandji	Prakash Mehra, Anjaan	Suresh Wadkar, Sadhana Sargam
Padosi Ki Biwi	260	"Bewafa Dil Mera Todke"	Usha Khanna	Hasrat Jaipuri	Anwar
Padosi Ki Biwi	261	"Mauka Mila Hai"	Usha Khanna	Hasrat Jaipuri	Anwar
Pyaar Mohabbat	262	"Aise Na Dekh Mujhe"	Laxmikant-Pyarelal	Anand Bakshi	solo
Pyar Ka Mandir	263	"O Meri Jaan"	Laxmikant-Pyarelal	Anand Bakshi	Mohammed Aziz
Pyar Ka Mandir	264	"Pyar Ke Pehle Kadam Pe"	Laxmikant-Pyarelal	Anand Bakshi	Kishore Kumar
Qatil	265	"Apni Ada Hai Meri"	Laxmikant-Pyarelal	Sameer	Mohammed Aziz
Qatil	266	"Maan Gaye"	Laxmikant-Pyarelal	Sameer	Shabbir Kumar
Qayamat Se Qayamat Tak	267	"Gazab Ka Hin Din"	Anand–Milind	Majrooh Sultanpuri	Udit Narayan
Qayamat Se Qayamat Tak	268	"Akela Hain To Kya Ghum Hai"	Anand–Milind	Majrooh Sultanpuri	Udit Narayan
Qayamat Se Qayamat Tak	269	"Kahe Sataaye"	Anand–Milind	Majrooh Sultanpuri	solo
Qayamat Se Qayamat Tak	270	"Ae Mere Humsafar"	Anand–Milind	Majrooh Sultanpuri	Udit Narayan
Saazish	271	"Mera Intezaar Karti Ho"	Kalyanji-Anandji	Anand Bakshi	Mohammed Aziz
Sherni	272	"Ghadi Ghadi Chunari"	Kalyanji-Anandji	Nida Fazli	Sadhana Sargam
Shiv Shakti	273	"Holi Main Dil Se Dil Mila Lo"	Anand–Milind		Mohammed Aziz
Shiv Shakti	274	"Peechha Na Chhodoongi"	Anand–Milind		Kishore Kumar
Shiv Shakti	275	"Mehfil Mein Hum Kya Aaye"	Anand–Milind		Shatrughan Sinha
Sila	276	"Aap Se Jab"	Jitin-Shyam	Kamal	Shabbir Kumar
Som Mangal Shani	277	"Khota Kahan Gadoge"	Anu Malik	Sameer	solo
Soorma Bhopali	278	"Tum Aaye Zindagi Mein"	Dilip Sen-Sameer Sen	Asad Bhopali	Dilraj Kaur
Tezaab	279	"Ek Do Teen"	Laxmikant-Pyarelal	Javed Akhtar	Amit Kumar
Tezaab	280	"So Gaya Yeh Jahaan"	Laxmikant-Pyarelal	Javed Akhtar	Nitin Mukesh, Shabbir Kumar
Tohfa Mohabbat Ka	281	"Suno Brij Ki Kahani"	Anup Jalota	Maya Govind	Anup Jalota
Zulm Ko Jala Doonga	282	"Teri Yaad Sataye"	Nadeem-Shravan	Anwar Sagar, Rani Malik, Madan Pal	Mohammed Aziz

=== 1989 ===
Film	No	Song	Composer(s)	Writer(s)	Co-artist(s)
Aag Ka Gola	283	"Aaya Aaya Woh"	Bappi Lahiri	Anjaan	Bappi Lahiri
Ab Meri Baari	284	"Moasambi Narangi"	Anand–Milind	Sameer	Amit Kumar
Ab Meri Baari	285	"Mujhko Hai Maloom"	Anand–Milind	Sameer	Udit Narayan
Ab Meri Baari	286	"Phool Phool Kali Kali"	Anand–Milind	Sameer	Suresh Wadkar
Abhimanyu	287	"Aaya Dil Main Churane"	Anu Malik	Indeevar	Amit Kumar
Abhimanyu	288	"Chandni Raat Hai"	Anu Malik	Indeevar	Amit Kumar
Abhimanyu	289	"Fire Brigade"	Anu Malik	Indeevar	Amit Kumar
Abhimanyu	290	"Utar Apni Dhoti"	Anu Malik	Farooq Kaiser	solo
Apna Desh Paraye Log	291	"Sej Palkon Ki"	Usha Khanna	Armaan Shahabi	Vinod Rathod
Bade Ghar Ki Beti	292	"Agar Khuda Jo Mile"	Laxmikant-Pyarelal	Santosh Anand	Mohammed Aziz
Bade Ghar Ki Beti	293	"Yeh Ladki Nahi Hai"	Laxmikant-Pyarelal	Santosh Anand	Mohammed Aziz
Bade Ghar Ki Beti	294	"Samdhi Teri Ghodi"	Laxmikant-Pyarelal	Hasan Kamaal	Mohammed Aziz, Hariharan
Batwara	295	"Tu Maro Kaun Lage"	Laxmikant-Pyarelal	Hasan Kamaal	Anuradha Paudwal, Kavita Krishnamurthy
Bhrashtachar	296	"Mere Seene Se Lagja"	Laxmikant-Pyarelal	Anand Bakshi	solo
Bhrashtachar	297	"Oontwali Se Jo Kare"	Laxmikant-Pyarelal	Anand Bakshi	solo
Daata	298	"Baabul Ka Yeh Ghar"	Kalyanji-Anandji	Anjaan	Kishore Kumar
Daata	299	"Baabul Ka Yeh Ghar" (sad)	Kalyanji-Anandji	Anjaan	Kishore Kumar
Daata	300	"Pina Vina Chhod"	Kalyanji-Anandji	Farooq Kaiser	Kishore Kumar
Dav Pech	301	"Jalne Laga Hai Ang Ang"	Anu Malik	Indeevar	Anu Malik
Dost	302	"Haathi Raaja"	R. D. Burman	Indeevar	solo
Eeshwar	303	"Dharmam Sharanam Gachhami"	Laxmikant-Pyarelal	Anjaan	Nitin Mukesh
Elaan-E-Jung	304	"Mera Naam Hai Badnaam"	Laxmikant-Pyarelal	Anand Bakshi	solo
Elaan-E-Jung	305	"Dekho Suno Dilwalo"	Laxmikant-Pyarelal	Anand Bakshi	solo
Elaan-E-Jung	306	"Doston De Dosti"	Laxmikant-Pyarelal	Anand Bakshi	Nitin Mukesh, Kavita Krishnamurthy
Faraar Qaidi	307	"Dooj Ka Chand Bhi"	Sonik-Omi	Brij Bihari	Suresh Wadkar
Faraar Qaidi	308	"Sargam Matwali Tu"	Sonik-Omi	Brij Bihari	Suresh Wadkar
Faraar Qaidi	309	"O Raani Maharani"	Sonik-Omi	Brij Bihari	Suresh Wadkar
Faraar Qaidi	310	"Tohfa Hai Tohfa"	Sonik-Omi	Brij Bihari	Suresh Wadkar
Garibon Ka Daata	311	"Duniya Mein Kaam Karo"	Bappi Lahiri	Anand Bakshi	Shailendra Singh, Anup Jalota
Gharana	312	"Kiss and Tell"	Laxmikant-Pyarelal	Anand Bakshi	Amit Kumar
Gharana	313	"Tere Daddy Be Diya"	Laxmikant-Pyarelal	Anand Bakshi	Amit Kumar
Ghar Ka Chiraag	314	"Aye Kash Tum Kahdo Kabhi"	Bappi Lahiri	Anjaan	Udit Narayan
Ghar Ka Chiraag	315	"Aye Kash Tum Kahdo Kabhi" (Sad)	Bappi Lahiri	Anjaan	Udit Narayan
Gola Barood	316	"Shabba Shabba"	Bappi Lahiri	Anjaan	solo
Gola Barood	317	"Mujhe Logon Samajhke Chor, Sipahi Mere Peechhe"	Bappi Lahiri		Mohammed Aziz
Jaadugar	318	"Naach Meri Radha"	Kalyanji-Anandji	Prakash Mehra	Kumar Sanu
Jaaydaad	319	"Mat Maro Tamancha"	Anu Malik	Nida Fazli	solo
Jurrat	320	"Oye Naukar Sarkari"	R.D. Burman	Anand Bakshi	solo
Kanoon Apna Apna	321	"A.B.C.D.E.F.G Hay Everybody"	Bappi Lahiri	Indeevar	solo
Kudrat Ka Faisla	322	"Mere Adde Ke Peechhe"	Bappi Lahiri	Anjaan	solo
Ladaai	323	"Tu Mera Boyfriend"	Anu Malik	Indeevar	Anu Malik
Lahu Ki Awaaz	324	"Teri Meri Meri Teri"	Usha Khanna	Anjaan	Vinod Rathod
Main Tera Dushman	325	"Saare Jahaan Ke Saamne"	Laxmikant-Pyarelal	Indeevar	Shabbir Kumar
Mujrim	326	"Raat Ke Bara Baje"	Anu Malik	Anjaan	Amit Kumar
Paap Ka Ant	327	"Saari Raat Hum Tun"	Bappi Lahiri	Anjaan	Amit Kumar
Paraya Ghar	328	"Humre Jiyara Ka"	Laxmikant-Pyarelal	Hassan Kamal	Mohammed Aziz
Paraya Ghar	329	"Pyaar Mil Gaya"	Laxmikant-Pyarelal	Hassan Kamal	solo
Prem Jaal	330	"Chacha Chachi Le Aao"	Kalyanji-Anandji	M. G. Hashmat	Manhar Udhas
Rakhwala	331	"Ladki Hyderabadi"	Anand–Milind	Sameer	solo
Sachai Ki Taqat	332	"Maine Chaha Tha"	Laxmikant-Pyarelal	Anand Bakshi	Amit Kumar
Shehzaade	333	"Ek Chhora Ek Chhori"	Laxmikant-Pyarelal	Anand Bakshi	Amit Kumar, Kavita Krishnamurthy, Mohammed Aziz
Shiv Ganga	334	"Kya Kahoon"	Chitragupta	Dilip Kanpuri	Kavita Krishnamurthy, Dilraj Kaur
Shiv Ganga	335	"O Jogi"	Chitragupta	Sameer	solo
Sikka	336	"Koti Hilela"	Bappi Lahiri	Indeevar	Amit Kumar
Sindoor Aur Bandook	337	"Tera Pyaar Mujhe"	Ajay Swamy	Gauhar Kanpuri, Yogesh	Udit Narayan
Suryaa	338	"Pyaar Kahe Banaya"	Laxmikant-Pyarelal	Santosh Anand	solo
Toofan	339	"Aao Raas Rache"	Anu Malik	Indeevar	Suresh Wadkar
Tridev	340	"Gali Gali Mein"	Kalyanji-Anandji	Anand Bakshi	Manhar Udhas
Tridev	341	"Gazar Ne Kiya"	Kalyanji-Anandji	Anand Bakshi	Sadhana Sargam, Sapna Mukherjee

== 1990s ==
=== 1990 ===
Film	No	Song	Composer(s)	Writer(s)	Co-artist(s)
Aaj Ka Arjun	342	"Mashuka Mashuka"	Bappi Lahiri	Anjaan	Bappi Lahiri, Amrish Puri
Aaj Ka Arjun	343	"Chali Aana Tu Pan Ki"	Bappi Lahiri	Anjaan	Amit Kumar, Bappi Lahiri
Aaj Ke Shahenshah	344	"Bolo Bolo"	Bappi Lahiri	Anjaan	Mohammed Aziz, Shobha Joshi
Aaj Ke Shahenshah	345	"Haiya Re Haiya"	Bappi Lahiri	Anjaan	Udit Narayan, Shabbir Kumar
Aaj Ke Shahenshah	346	"Rasgulla Khilai Ke"	Bappi Lahiri	Anjaan	solo
Agneepath	347	"Kisko Tha Pata"	Laxmikant-Pyarelal	Anand Bakshi	S. P. Balasubrahmanyam
Amba	348	"Sun Meri Shehzadi"	Laxmikant-Pyarelal	Anand Bakshi	Mohammed Aziz
Amba	349	"Tera Mera Mel"	Laxmikant-Pyarelal	Anand Bakshi	Mohammed Aziz
Amiri Garibi	350	"Budhi Ghodi Lal Lagaam	Laxmikant-Pyarelal	Anand Bakshi	solo
Amiri Garibi	351	"Bhool Vhulaiyya"	Laxmikant-Pyarelal	Anand Bakshi	solo
Amiri Garibi	352	"Tawaif Kahan Kisi Se"	Laxmikant-Pyarelal	Anand Bakshi	solo
Andher Gardi	353	"Raat Ke Sar Se"	Sonik-Omi	Sameer	Kumar Sanu
Apradhinee	354	"Sabse Karoongi Main"	Jeetu-Tapan	Kulwant Jani	solo
Atishbaaz	355	"Dekha Tujhe"	Laxmikant-Pyarelal	Sameer	Sudesh Bhosle
Badnaam (D)	356	"Aaja Main Padha Doon"	Ajay Swami	Ajay Swami	Vinod Rathod
Bungalow No. 666	357	"Chali Chal Tere Pyaar Ki"	Anu Malik	Sameer	Nitin Mukesh
C.I.D.	358	"Main Teri"	Kalyanji-Anandji	Anjaan	Amit Kumar
C.I.D.	359	"Teri Na Na"	Kalyanji-Anandji	Anjaan	Kumar Sanu
Ek Numbar Ka Chor	360	"Pyaar Se Jeet Lo	Masood Iqbal	Maya Govind	Mohammad Younus
Ek Numbar Ka Chor	361	"Zaalim Ne Mar Dala"	Masood Iqbal	Tajdar Amrohi	Mohammad Younus
Ek Numbar Ka Chor	362	"Pyaar Ka Mausam"	Masood Iqbal	Maya Govind	Amit Kumar
Galiyon Ka Badshah	363	"Hum Galiyon Ke Aware"	Kalyanji-Anandji	Anjaan	Sadhana Sargam
Galiyon Ka Badshah	364	"Yeh Phulwa Aayi Re"	Kalyanji-Anandji	Anjaan	solo
Ghar Ho To Aisa	365	"Dil Lagake Dekho"	Bappi Lahiri	Majrooh Sultanpuri	Sudesh Bhosle
Gunahon Ka Devta	366	"Aye Sanam"	Anu Malik	Indeevar	Kumar Sanu
Hatim Tai	367	"Aaj Muahkil Bachna Tera"	Laxmikant-Pyarelal	Hassan Kamal	Anupama Deshpande
Hatim Tai	368	"De Doon Tujhe Dil"	Laxmikant-Pyarelal	Hassan Kamal	Kavita Krishnamurthy
Hatim Tai	369	"Jin Win Bhoot Woot"	Laxmikant-Pyarelal	Hassan Kamal	solo
Iraada	370	"Apne Husn Dekhe Hai"	Kalyanji-Anandji	Anjaan	solo
Iraada	371	"Sapnon Ka Ho Saathi"	Kalyanji-Anandji	Anjaan	solo
Iraada	372	"Pyaar Ka Rang Chadha"	Kalyanji-Anandji	Anjaan	Kishore Kumar
Izzat Aabroo	373	"Aaya Hai Baharon Sang"	Ajay Swamy	Vishweshwar Sharma	solo
Izzatdaar	374	"Tumko Dekh Ke"	Laxmikant-Pyarelal	Anand Bakshi	Amit Kumar
Izzatdaar	375	"Ek Rasgulla Kahin"	Laxmikant-Pyarelal	Anand Bakshi	Amit Kumar
Izzatdaar	376	"Kis Kis Ko Main"	Laxmikant-Pyarelal	Anand Bakshi	Sudesh Bhosle
Izzatdaar	377	"Yaad Rakhiyo Yeh"	Laxmikant-Pyarelal	Anand Bakshi	Mohammad Aziz
Jaan Lada Denge	378	"Do It Do It"	Usha Khanna	Indeevar	Vijay Benedict
Jai Shiv Shankar	379	"Kisi Roz Mangi Thi"	R. D. Burman	Anand Bakshi	Amit Kumar
Jamai Raja	380	"Aag Lah Rahi Hai"	Laxmikant-Pyarelal	Javed Akhtar	Amit Kumar
Jamai Raja	381	"Hum Aur Tum"	Laxmikant-Pyarelal	Javed Akhtar	Amit Kumar
Jeevan Ek Sanghursh	382	"Mil Gayee Woh Mujhe"	Laxmikant-Pyarelal	Javed Akhtar	Amit Kumar
Kafan	383	"Yeh Tune Nahi"	Anand–Milind	Sameer	Udit Narayan
Karishma Kali Kaa	384	"Jai Kali Jai Jali"	Bappi Lahiri	Indeevar	solo
Karishma Kali Kaa	385	"Jai Kali Maa"	Bappi Lahiri	Indeevar	solo
Maha-Sangram	386	"I Love You" (female)	Anand–Milind	Sameer	solo
Maha-Sangram	387	"I Love You" (happy)	Anand–Milind	Sameer	Mohammed Aziz, Udit Narayan, Anand Chitragupta, Jolly Mukherjee
Maha-Sangram	388	"I Love You"	Anand–Milind	Sameer	Mohammed Aziz
Nache Nagin Gali Gali	389	"Jaise Bhi Tu"	Kalyanji-Anandji	Anjaan	solo
Nyay Anyay	390	"Ashiq Nazar Ka"	Anand–Milind	Majrooh Sultanpuri	Sudesh Bhosle
Paap Ki Kamaee	391	"Humpty Dumpty"	Anu Malik	Indeevar	Anu Malik
Pratibandh	392	"Bachcho Bajao Tali"	Laxmikant-Pyarelal	Anand Bakshi	solo
Pratibandh	393	"Kabhi Hua Nahin"	Laxmikant-Pyarelal	Anand Bakshi	Amit Kumar
Pratibandh	394	"Pyaar Mujhe Tum Karti Ho"	Laxmikant-Pyarelal	Anand Bakshi	Amit Kumar
Pyar Ka Karz	395	"Ek Saal Chalega"	Laxmikant-Pyarelal	Anand Bakshi	Sudesh Bhosle
Pyasi Nigahen	396	"Na Jaa Re"	Bidyut Goswami	Manzar Saburi	Kishore Kumar
Qayamat Ki Raat	397	"Saiyan Raja Ek Bangla"	Laxmikant-Pyarelal	Anand Bakshi	solo
Shaitani Ilaaka	398	"Dooba Dooba"	Bappi Lahiri	Anjaan	Udit Narayan, Sudesh Bhosle
Shandaar	399	"Meri Umar Kunwari"	Bappi Lahiri	Anjaan	Mohammed Aziz
Shandaar	400	"Bade Logon Ki Baat"	Bappi Lahiri	Anjaan	Shabbir Kumar, Anuradha Paudwal
Shatrutaa	401	"Mujhe Apna Bana Le"	Kalyanji-Anandji	Indeevar	Kishore Kumar
Sherdil	402	"Kuchh Gana Bajana"	Laxmikant-Pyarelal	Anand Bakshi	Kavita Krishnamurthy, Mohammed Aziz, Shailendra Singh
Sheshnaag	403	"Tera Haath Na Chhodungi"	Laxmikant-Pyarelal	Anand Bakshi	solo
Taqdeer Ka Tamasha	404	"O Thanedar Babu"	Anand–Milind	Sameer	solo
Taqdeer Ka Tamasha	405	"Apni Biwi Bachon Ke Kareeb"	Anand–Milind	Sameer	Mohammed Aziz
Taqdeer Ka Tamasha	406	"Apni Biwi Bachon Ke Kareeb" (Sad)	Anand–Milind	Sameer	Mohammed Aziz
Taqdeer Ka Tamasha	407	"Naye Daur Ka Dekho Logon"	Anand–Milind	Sameer	Anand Chitragupta
Tejaa	408	"Een Meen Sade Teen"	Anu Malik	Sameer, Anjaan	solo
Teri Talash Mein	409	"Happy New Year"	Naresh Sharma	Sameer	Amit Kumar
Teri Talash Mein	410	"Main Tera Raja Hoon"	Naresh Sharma	Sameer	Amit Kumar
Thanedaar	411	"Pehli Pehli Baar Aisa"	Bappi Lahiri	Indeevar	Amit Kumar
Tujhe Nahin Chhodunga	412	"Tum Se Nazar Milake"	C. P. Bhati	Hasan Kamaal	solo
Tujhe Nahin Chhodunga	413	"Bum Chik Bum"	C. P. Bhati	Abdul Sattar	Amit Kumar
Tujhe Nahin Chhodunga	414	"Aaj Saqi Tere Maikade Mein"	C. P. Bhati	Hasan Kamaal	Anuradha Paudwal, Mohammad Aziz, Amit Kumar
Veeru Dada	415	"Raat Ko Barah Baje"	Laxmikant-Pyarelal	Anand Bakshi	solo
Zakhmi Zameen	416	"Danda Phenk"	Anand–Milind	Sameer	solo

=== 1991 ===
Film	No	Song	Composer(s)	Writer(s)	Co-artist(s)
100 Days	417	"Gabbar Singh Yeh Keh"	Raamlaxman		Amit Kumar
Aaj Ka Samson	418	"Har Janam Mera"	Prem Gupta		Vinod Rathod
Aaj Ka Samson	419	"Mil Gaya Mil Gaya"	Prem Gupta		Vinod Rathod
Aakhri Cheekh	420	"Duniya Pyaar Ki Duniya"	Bappi Lahiri	Anjaan	Mohammed Aziz
Afsana Pyar Ka	421	"Yaad Teri Aati Hai"	Bappi Lahiri		solo
Ajooba	422	"Main Mitti Ka Gudda"	Laxmikant-Pyarelal		Mohammed Aziz
Ajooba	423	"O Meri Jaan-E-Bahaar"	Laxmikant-Pyarelal		Mohammed Aziz, Sudesh Bhosle, Anuradha Paudwal
Akayla	424	"Kehti Hai Duniya Akayla"	Laxmikant-Pyarelal		solo
Akayla	425	"Aag Lag Jaye Kahin"	Laxmikant-Pyarelal		Mohammad Aziz, Manhar Udhas
Akayla	426	"Mujhe Aaj Kuch Na Kehna"	Laxmikant-Pyarelal		Sudesh Bhosle
Anjaane Rishte	427	"Aur Kahan Awaz"	Anand–Milind	Majrooh Sultanpuri	Sadhana Sargam
Anjaane Rishte	428	"Ashiqon Ka Naam"	Anand–Milind	Majrooh Sultanpuri	Udit Narayan
Banjaran	429	"Yeh Jeevan Jitni Baar Mile"	Laxmikant-Pyarelal	Anand Bakshi	Mohammed Aziz
Banjaran	430	"Yeh Jeevan Jitni Baar Mile" (version 2)	Laxmikant-Pyarelal	Anand Bakshi	Mohammed Aziz
Banjaran	431	"Teri Banjaran Rasta Dekhe"	Laxmikant-Pyarelal	Anand Bakshi	solo
Banjaran	432	"Teri Banjaran Rasta Dekhe" (Version 2)	Laxmikant-Pyarelal	Anand Bakshi	solo
Banjaran	433	"Mere Dil Ki Galiyon Mein"	Laxmikant-Pyarelal	Anand Bakshi	Suresh Wadkar
Bhabhi	434	"Aa Jana Zara"	Anu Malik	Nawab Arzoo	Mohammed Aziz, Chandrani Mukherjee
Bhabhi	435	"Milne Jo Aayi"	Anu Malik	Nawab Arzoo	Abhijeet Bhattacharya
Bhabhi	436	"Tumhi Meri Maata"	Anu Malik	Hasrat Jaipuri	solo
Bhabhi	437	"Tumhi Meri Maata" (version 2)	Anu Malik	Hasrat Jaipuri	solo
Bhabhi	438	"Maiya O Maiya"	Anu Malik	Hasrat Jaipuri	solo
Bhabhi	439	"Achchaji Ab Hum To"	Anu Malik	Dev Kohli	Udit Narayan
Deewane	440	"Jisko Tha Intezar"	Usha Khanna	Indeevar	Shabbir Kumar
Dharam Sankat	441	"Chhoti Mirch Badi Tej"	Kalyanji-Anandji	Vishweshwar Sharma	solo
Dharam Sankat	442	"Kar Lo Itne Bulund"	Kalyanji-Anandji	Pushpa Verma	Sadhana Sargam, Mohammed Aziz
Dhun	443	"Koi Baat To Hoti Hai"	Laxmikant-Pyarelal		Talat Aziz
Do Matwale	444	"Anarkali Tere Sar Ki Kasam"	Laxmikant-Pyarelal	Sameer	Sudesh Bhosle, Jolly Mukherjee, Arun Daga
Dushman Devta	445	"Bubala Boo"	Bappi Lahiri	Anjaan	Bappi Lahiri
Ghar Parivar	446	"Paisa Rupaiya"	Kalyanji-Anandji	Anjaan	solo
Ghar Parivar	447	"Hum Garibon Ko Agar"	Kalyanji-Anandji	Anjaan	Udit Narayan
Farishtay	448	"Apna Hai Raj"	Bappi Lahiri	Anand Bakshi	Shabbir Kumar
Garajna	449	"Bambai Mein Pyar Hua"	Bappi Lahiri	Indeevar, Anjaan	Shabbir Kumar
Haque	450	"Maine Kab Socha Tha"	Anand–Milind	Sameer	
Hatyarin	451	"Bheeg Ja Barsaat Mein"	Naresh Sharma	Sameer	Mohammed Aziz
Hatyarin	452	"Kaise Buddhu"	Naresh Sharma	Sameer	Shabbir Kumar
Hum	453	"Ek Doosre Se"	Laxmikant-Pyarelal	Anand Bakshi	Mohammed Aziz, Udit Narayan, Sudesh Bhosle, Sonali Vajpaee
Hum	454	"Is Pyaar Ki Hum"	Laxmikant-Pyarelal	Anand Bakshi	Mohammed Aziz, Sudesh Bhosle, Vinay Mandke
Hum	455	"General Sahab Karo Tayari"	Laxmikant-Pyarelal	Anand Bakshi	Sudesh Bhosle, Vinay Mandke
Hum	456	"Sanam Mere Sanam"	Laxmikant-Pyarelal	Anand Bakshi	Amit Kumar
Inspector Kiron	457	"Ae Bharat Mata Ki"	Bappi Lahiri		solo
Inspector Kiron	458	"Kash Lagao Kash"	Bappi Lahiri		solo
Kaun Kare Kurbanie	459	"Anu Menu I Love You"	Kalyanji-Anandji	Anjaan	Mohammed Aziz, Sadhana Sargam, Suresh Wadkar
Khatra	460	"Main To Ladki Thi Akeli"	Aadesh Shrivastava		solo
Khilaaf	461	"Tum Bansi Bajate Ho"	Laxmikant-Pyarelal	Anand Bakshi	Manhar Udhas
Khoon Ka Karz	462	"Apni Prem Kahani"	Laxmikant-Pyarelal	Anand Bakshi	Amit Kumar
Khoon Ka Karz	463	"Balma Main Muqadama"	Laxmikant-Pyarelal	Anand Bakshi	solo
Khoon Ka Karz	464	"Kabhi Tum Humse Karo"	Laxmikant-Pyarelal	Anand Bakshi	Amit Kumar, Manhar Udhas
Khoon Ka Karz	465	"Main Ek Pagal Ladki"	Laxmikant-Pyarelal	Anand Bakshi	Sudesh Bhosle
Khooni Raat	466	"Tere Bin Main Kuch Nahin"	Usha Khanna	Asad Bhopali, Nida Fazli	Vinod Rathod
Lahu Luhan	467	"Main Jagi Hoon"	Anand–Milind		solo
Lahu Luhan	468	"Laddu Mook Gaye"	Anand–Milind		solo
Lakshmanrekha	469	"Yeh Zindagi Hai"	Laxmikant-Pyarelal	Anand Bakshi	Mohammed Aziz
Lakshmanrekha	470	"Kya Ghadu Hai"	Laxmikant-Pyarelal	Anand Bakshi	Amit Kumar
Maa	471	"Anjan Ki Siti"	Anu Malik	Dev Kohli	Anu Malik
Mehandi Ban Gayi Khoon	472	"Meri Mohabbat Ke"	Usha Khanna	Mahender Dalvi	Mohammed Aziz
Mehandi Ban Gayi Khoon	473	"Phoolon Ka Rang"	Usha Khanna	Mahender Dalvi	Kumar Sanu
Narasimha	474	"Chup Chaap Tu Kyon Khadi Hai"	Laxmikant-Pyarelal	Anand Bakshi	Mohammed Aziz
Narasimha	475	"Lekin Mohabbat Badi Hai"	Laxmikant-Pyarelal	Anand Bakshi	Mohammed Aziz
Narasimha	476	"Jao Tum Chahe Jahan"	Laxmikant-Pyarelal	Anand Bakshi	Amit Kumar
Narasimha	477	"Yaad Karoge Wahan"	Laxmikant-Pyarelal	Anand Bakshi	Amit Kumar
Narasimha	478	"Humse Tum Dosti Kar Lo"	Laxmikant-Pyarelal	Anand Bakshi	Udit Narayan
Narasimha	479	"Tum Ho Ajnabi To"	Laxmikant-Pyarelal	Anand Bakshi	Laxmikant
Paap Ki Aandhi	480	"Aa Pehna De Mujhe"	Laxmikant-Pyarelal	Anand Bakshi	Sudesh Bhosle
Parakrami	481	"Jab Tune Keh Di"	Laxmikant-Pyarelal	Anjaan	Amit Kumar
Paththar Ke Insaan	482	"Tu Hi Meri Prem Kahani"	Bappi Lahiri	Indeevar	Mohammed Aziz
Paththar Ke Insaan	483	"Paththar Ke Insan"	Bappi Lahiri	Indeevar	Amit Kumar
Pehli Mohabbat	484	"Jaanewale Sang Tere"	Kanak Raj	Faaiz Anwar	Kumar Sanu
Pehli Mohabbat	485	"Mera Deewanapan"	Kanak Raj	Faaiz Anwar	Udit Narayan
Phool Aur Kaante	486	"Tumse Milne Ko Dil Karta Hai"	Nadeem-Shravan	Sameer	Kumar Sanu
Phool Aur Kaante	487	"Dheere Dhere Pyar Ko Badhana"	Nadeem-Shravan	Sameer	Kumar Sanu
Phool Aur Kaante	488	"Dheere Dheere Hausla" (Sad)	Nadeem-Shravan	Sameer	Kumar Sanu
Phool Aur Kaante	489	"Dheere Dheere Hausla" (Female)	Nadeem-Shravan	Sameer	solo
Phool Bane Angaray	490	"Ruksana Aa Jana"	Bappi Lahiri	Anjaan	Bappi Lahiri
Pratigyabadh	491	"Rama Ho Rama"	Kalyanji-Anandji	Hassan Kamal	Kumar Sanu
Pratikar	492	"Hungama Ho Jaye"	Bappi Lahiri	Anand Bakshi	Bappi Lahiri
Pyar Hua Chori Chori	493	"Pyar Hua Chori Chori"	Laxmikant-Pyarelal	Anand Bakshi	Amit Kumar
Pyar Ka Devta	494	"Zind Tere Naam"	Laxmikant-Pyarelal	Anand Bakshi	Mohammed Aziz
Pyar Ka Devta	495	"Kuchh Der Pehle"	Laxmikant-Pyarelal	Anand Bakshi	Mohammed Aziz
Pyar Ka Devta	496	"Behnen Hasti Hai To"	Laxmikant-Pyarelal	Anand Bakshi	Mohammed Aziz, Kavita Krishnamurthy
Pyar Ka Devta	497	"Behnen Hasti Hai To" (sad)	Laxmikant-Pyarelal	Anand Bakshi	Mohammed Aziz, Kavita Krishnamurthy
Ramgarh Ke Sholay	498	"Hum Nahin To"	Anu Malik		Kumar Sanu
Rupaye Dus Karod	499	"Namak Tere Chehre Ka"	Bappi Lahiri		Shabbir Kumar
Saajan	500	"Mera Dil Bhi Kitna"	Nadeem Shravan	Sameer	Kumar Sanu
Saajan	501	"Dekha Hai Pehli Baar"	Nadeem Shravan	Sameer	S. P. Balasubrahmanyam
Saajan	502	"Tu Shayar Hai"	Nadeem Shravan	Sameer	solo
Sapnon Ka Mandir	503	"Aaja Aaja Ri Tu"	Laxmikant-Pyarelal	Sameer	Mohammed Aziz
Sapnon Ka Mandir	504	"Mummy Bhooka Lagi"	Laxmikant-Pyarelal	Sameer	Mohammad Aziz, Sarika Kapoor
Shankra	505	"Ja Ja Ja"	Laxmikant-Pyarelal	Hassan Kamal	solo
Shankra	506	"Jana Na Tu Nain Milake"	Laxmikant-Pyarelal	Hassan Kamal	Mohammed Aziz
Shankra	507	"Jana Na Tu Nain Milake" (sad)	Laxmikant-Pyarelal	Hassan Kamal	Mohammed Aziz
Shankra	508	"Main Aur Tu"	Laxmikant-Pyarelal	Hassan Kamal	Mohammad Aziz, Sudesh Bhosle
Shanti Kranti	509	"Adhi Night Mein"	Hamsalekha	Indeevar	S. P. Balasubrahmanyam
Shanti Kranti	510	"Adhi Night Mein" (version 2)	Hamsalekha	Indeevar	S. P. Balasubrahmanyam
Shanti Kranti	511	"Purvaee"	Hamsalekha	Indeevar	S. P. Balasubrahmanyam
Shanti Kranti	512	"Sajna Humein Tum"	Hamsalekha	Indeevar	S. P. Balasubrahmanyam
Shanti Kranti	513	"Tu Hi Mera"	Hamsalekha	Indeevar	S. P. Balasubrahmanyam
Shanti Kranti	514	"Ude Yuhin Ooncha"	Hamsalekha	Indeevar	Suresh Wadkar
Shanti Kranti	515	"Jo Aayega Woh Jayega"	Hamsalekha	Indeevar	solo
Shiv Ram	516	"Tere Lab Se Mere"	Rajesh Roshan	Anwar Sagar	Mohammed Aziz
Swaarg Jaisa Ghar	517	"Deewana Hoon Main"	Bappi Lahiri	Majrooh Sultanpuri	Kumar Sanu
Swaarg Yahaan Narak Yahaan	518	"Khushiyan Aayi"	Rajesh Roshan	Indeevar	Udit Narayan, Mangal Singh, Nitin Mukesh
Vishkanya	519	"Roja Mohe"	Bappi Lahiri		Sudesh Bhosle
Yodha	520	"Pyaar Bada Mushkil Hai"	Bappi Lahiri	Anand Bakshi	Amit Kumar
Yodha	521	"Whole Day Whole Night"	Bappi Lahiri	Anand Bakshi	Amit Kumar

=== 1992 ===
Film	No	Song	Composer(s)	Writer(s)	Co-artist(s)
101 Days	522	"Tunka Pyaar Ka"	Raam Laxman	Dev Kohli	solo
101 Days	523	"Tu Jaan Hai" (female)	Raam Laxman	Dev Kohli	solo
Aaj Ka Gunda Raj	524	"Lashkara Lashkara"	Anand–Milind	Sameer	Kumar Sanu
Aaj Ka Gunda Raj	525	"Tum Mujhe Achche"	Anand–Milind	Sameer	Abhijeet
Aaj Ki Taaqat	526	La Baam Ba"	Bappi Lahiri	Indeevar	solo
Ajeeb Dastan Hai Yeh	527	"Yeh Jaan Kyon Pighalti Hai"	Shyam-Surender	Satish Sharma	Vinod Rathod
Ajeeb Dastan Hai Yeh	528	"Har Lamha Bekhudi"	Shyam-Surender	Satish Sharma	Vinod Rathod
Ajeeb Dastan Hai Yeh	529	"Tere Pyaar Hai Kya"	Shyam-Surender	Satish Sharma	Kumar Sanu
Anaam	530	"Chudi Boli Paayal Bole"	Nadeem-Shravan	Sameer	Kumar Sanu
Apradhi	531	"Aage Aage Tu"	Laxmikant-Pyarelal	Anand Bakshi	solo
Apradhi	532	"Dard-E-Dil Jeene Ka"	Laxmikant-Pyarelal	Anand Bakshi	Mohammed Aziz
Apradhi	533	"Yeh Pyar Bada Bedardi"	Laxmikant-Pyarelal	Anand Bakshi	Vinod Rathod
Chamatkar	534	"Is Pyar Se Meri Taraf Na Dekho"	Anu Malik	Anand Bakshi	Kumar Sanu
Chamatkar	535	"Is Pyaar Se Meri Taraf" (version 2)	Anu Malik	Anand Bakshi	Kumar Sanu
Daman	536	"Agar Ek Ladki Se"	Khayyam		Abhijeet Bhattacharya
Deewana	537	"Payeliya"	Nadeem Shravan	Sameer	Kumar Sanu
Deewana	538	"Aisi Deewangi"	Nadeem Shravan	Sameer	Vinod Rathod
Dhaar	539	Tumne Kabhi Samjha Nahi"	Sanjay Chakrabarty	Naqsh Lyallpuri	solo
Dil Ka Kya Kasoor	540	"Khata To Jab Hoke"	Nadeem-Shravan	Anwar Sagar	Kumar Sanu
Dilwale Kabhi Na Hare	541	"Tu Meri Hai"	Nadeem-Shravan	Mahender Dalvi	Kumar Sanu
Dilwale Kabhi Na Hare	542	"Khushboo Tumhare Pyaar Ki"	Nadeem-Shravan	Mahender Dalvi	Kumar Sanu
Dilwale Kabhi Na Hare	543	"Hum Pyaar Karte Hain"	Nadeem-Shravan	Mahender Dalvi	Kumar Sanu, Nitin Mukesh
Dilwale Kabhi Na Hare	544	"Main Hoon Naarangi"	Nadeem-Shravan	Mahender Dalvi	solo
Diwani Jawani	545	"Pyaasa Pyaasa Dil Hai"	Jeetu-Tapan	Anjaan	solo
Do Hanso Ka Joda	546	"Kaise Bitayi Pehli Raat"	Dilip Sen-Sameer Sen	Dilip Tahir	solo
Dushman Zamana	547	"Mausam Pyaara Bheega Bheega"	Mahesh-Kishore	Anwar Sagar	Kumar Sanu
Ganga Bani Shola	548	"Sajna Maine Tumko"	Dilip Sen-Sameer Sen	Mahender Dalvi	Anwar
Ganga Ka Vachan	549	"Chham Chham"	Nikhil-Vinay	Rani Malik	solo
Ganga Ka Vachan	550	"Satrangi Chudiyan"	Nikhil-Vinay	Rani Malik	solo
Ganga Ka Vachan	551	"Mera Neend Kahin"	Nikhil-Vinay	Yogesh	Udit Narayan
Geet	552	"Sar Pe Gam Gam"	Bappi Lahiri		solo
Geet	553	"Jo Dil Se Nikle Woh"	Bappi Lahiri		solo
Geet	554	"Tujh Se Mujhe Pyar Tha"	Bappi Lahiri		Kumar Sanu
Geet	555	"Tere Sur Mein Main Gaoon"	Bappi Lahiri		Dev Ashish
Humlaa	556	"Tu Bada Aadmi Hai"	Laxmikant-Pyarelal	Anand Bakshi	solo
Humlaa	557	"Dil Nahin Dena Re"	Laxmikant-Pyarelal	Anand Bakshi	Amit Kumar
Humshakal	558	"Kuchh Na Socha"	Laxmikant-Pyarelal	Majrooh Sultanpuri	Kavita Krishnamurthy
Insaaf Ki Devi	559	"Ankhon Mein Pali" (version 1)	Bappi Lahiri	Indeevar	Kumar Sanu
Insaaf Ki Devi	560	"Ankhon Mein Pali" (version 2)	Bappi Lahiri	Indeevar	Kumar Sanu
Insaaf Ki Devi	561	"Ankhon Mein Pali" (version 3)	Bappi Lahiri	Indeevar	solo
Isi Ka Naam Zindagi	562	"Bum Bhole"	Bappi Lahiri	Ramesh Pant	Bappi Lahiri
Isi Ka Naam Zindagi	563	"Gulai Gulai Go"	Bappi Lahiri	Ramesh Pant	Bappi Lahiri
Isi Ka Naam Zindagi	564	"Gulai Gulai Go" (version 2)	Bappi Lahiri	Ramesh Pant	Bappi Lahiri
Isi Ka Naam Zindagi	565	"Tum Jaisa Koi"	Bappi Lahiri	Ramesh Pant	Amit Kumar
Ishq Khuda Hai	566	"Deewana Main Pagli"	Dilip Sen-Sameer Sen		Shobha Joshi
Jaan Tere Naam	567	"Maine Yeh Dil"	Nadeem-Shravan	Sameer	Kumar Sanu
Jaan Tere Naam	568	"In the Morning"	Nadeem-Shravan	Sameer	Kumar Sanu, Udit Narayan
Jethaa	569	"Shaam Savere"	Kamal Kant	Kunwant Jani	Dilraj Kaur
Jo Jeeta Wohi Sikandar	570	"Naam Hai Mera Fonseca"	Jatin-Lalit	Majrooh Sultanpuri	Amit Kumar
Kal Ki Awaz	571	"Aaj Raat Chandni Hai"	Nadeem-Shravan	Sameer	Kumar Sanu, Sadhana Sargam
Kamsin	572	"Mere Dil Pe Haath Hai"	Mahesh-Kishore		Vipin Sachdeva
Karm Yodha	573	"Jhumpak Jhumpak"	Ajit Varman	Nadira Babbar	Suresh Wadkar
Khel	574	"Zindagi Ke Khel Mein"	Rajesh Roshan	Javed Akhtar	Kumar Sanu
Khiladi	575	"Waada Raha Sanam"	Jatin-Lalit	Anwar Sagar	Abhijeet Bhattacharya
Khuda Gawah	576	"Tu Na Ja Mere Baadshah"	Laxmikant-Pyarelal	Anand Bakshi	Mohammed Aziz
Khuda Gawah	577	"Deewana Mujhe Kar Gaya"	Laxmikant-Pyarelal	Anand Bakshi	Mohammed Aziz
Khuda Gawah	578	"Mere Watan Mein Maine"	Laxmikant-Pyarelal	Anand Bakshi	Suresh Wadkar
Laat Saab	579	"Churaya Tune Dil Mera"	Anu Malik	Guslhan Bawra	Udit Narayan
Laat Saab	580	"De Do De Do"	Anu Malik	Guslhan Bawra	Kumar Sanu
Laat Saab	581	"Ek Tu Hi Hai Mera"	Anu Malik	Guslhan Bawra	solo
Mere Meherban	582	"O Mister Prince"	Bappi Lahiri		Kumar Sanu
Mere Meherban	583	"Taare Kyon Muskuraye"	Bappi Lahiri		Solo
Muskurahat	584	"Phool Ki Patta Sa"	Raam Laxman		Udit Narayan
Paayal	585	"Tera Yeh Pyaar"	Nadeem-Shravan	Sameer	Kumar Sanu
Phoolwati	586	"Kurta Jaalidar"	Raam Laxman	Dev Kohli, M. G. Hashmat	solo
Prem Deewane	587	"Mohabbat Zindabad"	Laxmikant-Pyarelal		Udit Narayan, Kavita Krishnamurthy, Mohammad Aziz
Prem Deewane	588	"Piya Tune Mera Jiya"	Laxmikant-Pyarelal		Udit Narayan
Prem Deewane	589	"Aisa Lagi Aag"	Laxmikant-Pyarelal		Udit Narayan
Pyaar Deewana Hota Hai	590	"Pyaar Deewana Hota Hai"	Babul Bose	Madan Pal	Kumar Sanu
Pyaar Deewana Hota Hai	591	"Mere Man Ka Mausam"	Babul Bose	Madan Pal	Kumar Sanu
Pyaar Deewana Hota Hai	592	"Kya Yehi Pyaar Hai"	Babul Bose	Madan Pal	Kumar Sanu
Pyar Hua Chori Chori	593	"Pyar Hua Chori Chori"	Laxmikant-Pyarelal	Anand Bakshi	Amit Kumar
Qaid Mein Hai Bulbul	594	"Qaid Mein Hai Bulbul"	Anand–Milind	Sameer	Suresh Wadkar
Qaid Mein Hai Bulbul	595	"Main Teri Prem Deewani"	Anand–Milind	Sameer	Suresh Wadkar
Qaid Mein Hai Bulbul	596	"Main Kali"	Anand–Milind	Sameer	solo
Qaid Mein Hai Bulbul	597	"Hum To Hain Love Birds"	Anand–Milind	Sameer	Abhijeet Bhattacharya
Raju Ban Gaya Gentleman	598	"Kya Hua" (Laveria Hua)	Jatin-Lalit	Mahendra Dehlvi	Kumar Sanu; Jolly Mukherjee
Raju Ban Gaya Gentleman	599	"Tu Mere Saath Saath"	Jatin-Lalit	Mahendra Dehlvi	Kumar Sanu
Raju Ban Gaya Gentleman	600	"Kehti Hai Dil Ki Lagi"	Jatin-Lalit	Vinod Mahendra	Kumar Sanu
Raju Ban Gaya Gentleman	601	"Seene Mein Dil Hai"	Jatin-Lalit	Madan Pal	Kumar Sanu
Raju Ban Gaya Gentleman	602	"Tham Tham Tham"	Jatin-Lalit	Manoj Darpan	Kumar Sanu
Rishta To Ho Aisa	603	"Rukja Kidher Chamakti Chali"	Laxmikant-Pyarelal	Majrooh Sultanpuri	Mohammed Aziz
Rishta To Ho Aisa	604	"Wallah Kyaa Baat Hai"	Laxmikant-Pyarelal	Majrooh Sultanpuri	Sudesh Bhosle
Sahebzaade	605	"Sajna Khali Haath"	Laxmikant-Pyarelal	Hassan Kamal	solo
Sapne Sajan Ke	606	"Yeh Dua Hai Meri"	Nadeem Shravan	Anwar Sagar	Kumar Sanu
Sapne Sajan Ke	607	"Sapne Sajan Ke"	Nadeem Shravan	Sameer	Kumar Sanu
Sapne Sajan Ke	608	"Kabhi Bhoola Kabhi Yaad Kiya"	Nadeem Shravan	Sameer	Mukul Agarwal
Sapne Sajan Ke	609	"Aa Raha Hai Maza"	Nadeem Shravan	Sameer	Kumar Sanu
Sapne Sajan Ke	610	"Shikwa Karoon Ya Shikayat Karon"	Nadeem Shravan	Sameer	Kumar Sanu
Sapne Sajan Ke	611	"Kahta Hain Mausam"	Nadeem Shravan	Sameer	solo
Sapne Sajan Ke	612	"Dil Ne Jo Socha Tha"	Nadeem Shravan	Shailender Singh	Surendra Sathi
Shola Aur Shabnam	613	"Tere Mere Pyar Mein"	Bappi Lahiri	Anjaan, Govinda	Shailendra Singh, Debashish Dasgupta
Swaarg Se Pyaara Ghar Hamara	614	"Aadat Chhhuda Doon"	Laxmikant-Pyarelal	Anand Bakshi	solo
Swaarg Se Pyaara Ghar Hamara	615	"Zara Ruk Jaa"	Laxmikant-Pyarelal	Anand Bakshi	Sudesh Bhosle
Tilak	616	"Aankh Ladoon"	Anand–Milind	Sameer	solo
Umar 55 Ki Dil Bachpan Ka	617	"Yeh Dil Kaho Toh"	Dilip Sen-Sameer Sen		Kumar Sanu
Umar 55 Ki Dil Bachpan Ka	618	"Duniya Ko Chhod De"	Dilip Sen-Sameer Sen		Amit Kumar
Vishwatma	619	"Aankhon Mein Hai Kya"	Viju Shah		Sadhana Sargam, Udit Narayan, Mohammad Aziz
Vishwatma	620	"Toofan"	Viju Shah		Amit Kumar, Sadhana Sargam, Sapna Mukherjee, Boney
Yeh Raat Phir Na Aayegi	621	"Haye Haye Sans Chadi"	Rajesh Roshan	Raj Tilak	solo
Zulm Ki Hukumat	622	"Chiklo Chiklo"	Dilip Sen-Sameer Sen	Sameer	Amit Kumar

=== 1993 ===
Film	No	Song	Composer(s)	Writer(s)	Co-artist(s)
15 August	623	"Jhoom E Dil Vo Mera"	Rajan Arvind	Rajan	Kumar Sanu
15 August	624	"Tum Hi Ho Mehboob"	Rajan Arvind	Rani Malik	Kumar Sanu
15 August	625	"Aakhon Se"	Rajan Arvind	Rani Malik	Kumar Sanu
15 August	626	"Dil Ke Kareeb"	Rajan Arvind	Rani Malik	Kumar Sanu
Aadmi Khilona Hai	627	"Aadmi Khilona Hai"	Nadeem-Shravan	Sameer	solo
Aadmi Khilona Hai	628	"Bul Bul Ne Bhi"	Nadeem-Shravan	Sameer	Mohammad Aziz
Aadmi Khilona Hai	629	"Bohat Jatate Ho"	Nadeem-Shravan	Sameer	Mohammad Aziz
Aadmi Khilona Hai	630	"Mat Kar Itna Guroor"	Nadeem-Shravan	Sameer	Pankaj Udhas
Aadmi Khilona Hai	631	"Tu Jo Na Mile Gi Hum Ko"	Nadeem-Shravan	Sameer	Sudesh Bhosale
Aag Ka Toofan	632	"Bindiya Kangana"	Bappi Lahiri	Rani Malik	Kumar Sanu
Aag Ka Toofan	633	"Aisi Waisi Nazron Se"	Bappi Lahiri	Rani Malik	Kumar Sanu
Aankhen	634	"O Lal Dupatte Wali"	Bappi Lahiri	Indeevar	Kavita Krishnamurthy, Kumar Sanu, Sudesh Bhosale
Aashiq Awara	635	"Saat Sooron Ke Sangam Se"	Laxmikant-Pyarelal	Anand Bakshi	solo
Aashiq Awara	636	"Maine Pyar Kar Liya"	Laxmikant-Pyarelal	Anand Bakshi	Udit Narayan
Aashiq Awara	637	"Aaj Abhi Isi Waqt"	Laxmikant-Pyarelal	Anand Bakshi	Udit Narayan
Aashiq Awara	638	"Jai Jagdish Hare"	Laxmikant-Pyarelal	Anand Bakshi	Vinod Rathod
Akele Na Jaana	639	"Rumaal"	Rajan Bawa	Farooq Hasan Butt	solo
Anari	640	"Choti Si Pyari Si Nanhi Si"	Anand–Milind	Sameer	solo
Anari	641	"Pyar Mein Dil De Diya"	Anand–Milind	Sameer	Kumar Sanu
Antim Nyay	642	"Zara Hatt Soniye"	Raam Laxman	Dev Kohli	S. P. Balasubrahmanyam
Ashaant	643	"Deewane Tu Hai Jahaan"	Jatin-Lalit	Hasrat Jaipuri, Madan Pal	Kumar Sanu
Aulad Ke Dushman	644	"Main Tera Deewana Hoon"	Shyam-Surender	Satish Sharma	Kumar Sanu, Sadhana Sargam
Baazigar	645	"Baazigar O Baazigar"	Anu Malik	Nawab Arzoo	Kumar Sanu
Baazigar	646	"Ae Mere Humsafar"	Anu Malik	Gauhar Kanpuri	Vinod Rathod
Baazigar	647	"Samajh Kar Chand Jis Ko"	Anu Malik	Zameer Kazmi	Vinod Rathod
Badi Bahen	648	"Dukhi Janon Ke Pita"	Laxmikant-Pyarelal	Majrooh	solo
Badi Bahen	649	"Main James Yeh Bond"	Laxmikant-Pyarelal	Majrooh	Sudesh Bhosale
Badi Bahen	650	"Dil Na Tadpaya Karo"	Laxmikant-Pyarelal	Majrooh	Mohammed Aziz
Balmaa	651	"Meri Saheliyon, Meri Saath Aao"	Nadeem-Shravan	Sameer	solo
Balmaa	652	"Yeh Mausam Bhi Gaya"	Nadeem-Shravan	Sameer	Kumar Sanu
Bedardi	653	"Maine Sote Diye"	Laxmikant-Pyarelal	Anand Bakshi	solo
Bedardi	654	"Na Meri Zabaan Pe"	Laxmikant-Pyarelal	Anand Bakshi	Kumar Sanu
Bedardi	655	"Ek Din To Honi Thi Mohabbat"	Laxmikant-Pyarelal	Anand Bakshi	Vinod Rathod
Bedardi	656	"Main Tumse Pyar Karti Hoon"	Laxmikant-Pyarelal	Anand Bakshi	Vinod Rathod
Birjoo	657	"Chaudah Pandrah Solah"	Jugal Kishore, Tilak Raaj	Salim Sagar	solo
Bhookamp	658	"Tum Jo Mile"	Jatin-Lalit	Sameer	Kumar Sanu
Bhookamp	659	"Yahi Woh Jagah Hai"	Jatin-Lalit	Sameer	Kumar Sanu
Boy Friend	660	"Keh Do To"	Jatin-Lalit	Mahender Dalvi	Abhijeet
Chahoonga Main Tujhe	661	"I Love You"	Laxmikant-Pyarelal	Anand Bakshi	solo
Chahoonga Main Tujhe	662	"Jao Logo Jao"	Laxmikant-Pyarelal	Anand Bakshi	solo
Chahoonga Main Tujhe	663	"Tera Badan Bhi"	Laxmikant-Pyarelal	Anand Bakshi	Amit Kumar
Chandra Mukhi	664	"Tere Dil Ki Baat"	Anand–Milind		Kumar Sanu
Dalaal	665	"Mar Gaye Mar Gaye"	Bappi Lahiri		Udit Narayan
Dalaal	666	"Mere Ramji Mere Bhagwanji"	Bappi Lahiri		Kumar Sanu
Dalaal	667	"Gutur Gutur"	Bappi Lahiri		Kumar Sanu, Ila Arun, Bappi Lahiri
Damini	668	"Kaga To Udd Gaya"	Nadeem-Shravan	Sameer	solo
Damini	669	"Gawah Hain Chand Taare"	Nadeem-Shravan	Sameer	Kumar Sanu
Damini	670	"Sacha Aashiq Hai To"	Nadeem-Shravan	Sameer	Kumar Sanu
Darr	671	"Ang Se Ang Lagana"	Shiv-Hari	Anand Bakshi	Vinod Rathod, Asha Bhosle, Sudesh Bhosale
Dhanwaan	672	"Koi Phool Kahin Na Khila"	Anand–Milind	Sameer	Abhijeet
Dhartiputra	673	"Khamoshi Hai Ek Wajah Hai" (Female)	Nadeem-Shravan	Sameer	solo
Dhartiputra	674	"Khamoshi Hai Ek Wajah Hai" (Duet)	Nadeem-Shravan	Sameer	Kumar Sanu
Dhartiputra	675	"Mera Tohfa Tu Kar Le Kabul"	Nadeem-Shravan	Sameer	Kumar Sanu
Dhartiputra	676	"Saare Rangon Se Hai"	Nadeem-Shravan	Sameer	Kumar Sanu
Dhartiputra	677	"Babul Bole Angna More"	Nadeem-Shravan	Sameer	solo
Dhartiputra	678	"Yeh Hai Sanamkhana"	Nadeem-Shravan	Sameer	solo
Dil Apna Aur Preet Paraee	679	"Abhi Abhi Maine"	Usha Khanna	Yogesh	Kumar Sanu
Dil Apna Aur Preet Paraee	680	"Yeh Palkein"	Usha Khanna	Yogesh	Kumar Sanu
Dil Hai Betaab	681	"Aao Chalo Bhag Chalen"	Laxmikant-Pyarelal	Sameer	Udit Narayan
Dil Hai Betaab	682	"Kya Tumhe Pata Hai"	Laxmikant-Pyarelal	Rani Malik	solo
Dil Hi To Hai	683	"Dil Hi To Hai"	Laxmikant-Pyarelal		Mohammed Aziz
Dil Hi To Hai	684	"Sahiba O Sahiba"	Laxmikant-Pyarelal		Sudesh Bhosle, Amit Kumar
Dil Ki Baazi	685	"Buddha Kya Jawanon Se"	Raam Laxman		solo
Dil Ki Baazi	686	"Shaadi Karoongi"	Raam Laxman		Amit Kumar
Dil Ki Baazi	687	"Mujhe Sardi Lag Gayee"	Raam Laxman		Udit Narayan
Dil Tera Aashiq	688	"Pyar Ke Badle"	Nadeem-Shravan	Sameer	Kumar Sanu
Dil Tera Aashiq	689	"Dil Tera Aashiq"	Nadeem-Shravan	Sameer	Kumar Sanu
Dil Tera Aashiq	690	Kam Se Kam Itna	Nadeem-Shravan	Sameer	Mukul Aggarwal
Dil Tera Aashiq	691	"Humse Sajna Kyon Rootha"	Nadeem-Shravan	Sameer	solo
Dil Tera Aashiq	692	"Namaste Namaste"	Nadeem-Shravan	Sameer	Vinod Rathod
Divya Shakti	693	"Kare Kaise Ada Rab"	Nadeem-Shravan	Sameer	solo
Divya Shakti	694	"Aap Ko Dekh Kar"	Nadeem-Shravan	Sameer	Kumar Sanu
Divya Shakti	695	"Bata Mujhko Sanam Mere"	Nadeem-Shravan	Sameer	Kumar Sanu
Divya Shakti	696	"Nahin Nahin Kabhi Nahin"	Nadeem-Shravan	Sameer	Kumar Sanu
Dosti Ki Saugandh	697	"Bikte Hain Sare Shaam"	Surinder Kohli	Dev Kohli	solo
Dosti Ki Saugandh	698	"Ek Pal Aaja Re Mahiya"	Surinder Kohli	Dev Kohli	Kumar Sanu
Geetanjali	699	"Aap Ke Shekhar Mein"	Bappi Lahiri		solo
Geetanjali	700	"Dil Aaj Sambhaloon Kaise"	Bappi Lahiri		solo
Gumraah	701	"Tere Pyaar Ko Salam O Salam"	Laxmikant-Pyarelal	Anand Bakshi	solo
Hum Anari Hain	702	"Hey Tune Mujhe"	Anand–Milind	Sameer	Kumar Sanu
Hum Hain Kamaal Ke	703	"Jhoom E Dil Vo Mera"	Naresh Sharma	Rani Malik	S. P. Balasubrahmanyam
Hum Hain Kamaal Ke	704	"Sun Sun Re Sajan"	Naresh Sharma	Rani Malik	S. P. Balasubrahmanyam
Hum Hain Kamaal Ke	705	"Agar Tum Humse"	Naresh Sharma	Rani Malik	S. P. Balasubrahmanyam
Hum Hain Kamaal Ke	706	"Bas Yahi Ji"	Naresh Sharma	Rani Malik	Kumar Sanu
Hum Hain Kamaal Ke	707	"Kitne Haseen Kitne Jawaan"	Naresh Sharma	Rani Malik	solo
Hum Hain Rahi Pyar Ke	708	"Ghunghat Ki Aad Se"	Nadeem-Shravan	Sameer	Kumar Sanu
Hum Hain Rahi Pyar Ke	709	"Mujhse Mohabbat Ka Izhar"	Nadeem-Shravan	Sameer	Kumar Sanu
Hum Hain Rahi Pyar Ke	710	"Yoohi Kat Jayega Safar"	Nadeem-Shravan	Sameer	Kumar Sanu
Hum Hain Rahi Pyar Ke	711	"Bambai Se Gayi Poona"	Nadeem-Shravan	Sameer	solo
Izzat Ki Roti	712	"Humne Unke Mohalle Mein"	Bappi Lahiri	Anjaan	Mohammed Aziz
Jeena Bahin Bin Tere	713	"Mere Hathon Ki Lakeeron Mein"	Rajesh Roshan	Indeevar, Naqsh Lyallpuri	Kumar Sanu
Kaise Kaise Rishte	714	"Ho Gaya Hai Pyaar"	Nadeem-Shravan	Sameer	Kumar Sanu
Kaise Kaise Rishte	715	"Phoolon Se Zyada"	Nadeem-Shravan	Sameer	Kumar Sanu
Kaise Kaise Rishte	716	"Na Maang Diya Gora"	Nadeem-Shravan	Sameer	solo
Kanyaadan	717	"Mere Seene Mein"	Aadesh Shrivastava	Madan Pal	Kumar Sanu
Kanyaadan	718	"Tu Meri Shayari"	Aadesh Shrivastava	Shyam Raj	Kumar Sanu
Khalnayak	719	"Aaja Sajan Aaja"	Laxmikant-Pyarelal	Anand Bakshi	solo
Khalnayak	720	"Palki Mein Hoke Savaar Chali Re"	Laxmikant-Pyarelal	Anand Bakshi	solo
Khalnayak	721	"Choli Ke Peeche"	Laxmikant-Pyarelal	Anand Bakshi	Ila Arun
Khalnayak	722	"Aise Teri Yaad Aati Hai"	Laxmikant-Pyarelal	Anand Bakshi	Mohammed Aziz
Khalnayak	723	"Der Se Aana Jaldi Jaana"	Laxmikant-Pyarelal	Anand Bakshi	Manhar Udhas
King Uncle	724	"Akkad Bakkad Bombay Bo"	Rajesh Roshan	Javed Akhtar	Sudesh Bhosale
King Uncle	725	"Khush Rahne Ko Zaroori"	Rajesh Roshan	Indeevar	Vinod Rathod, Nitin Mukesh, Sadhana Sargam
Krishan Avtaar	726	"Mera Mehboob Mujhse"	Nadeem-Shravan	Sameer	Vinod Rathod
Krishan Avtaar	727	"Humse Pyaar Karo"	Nadeem-Shravan	Sameer	Vinod Rathod
Krishan Avtaar	728	"Nigaahon Ke Sawaal Ka"	Nadeem-Shravan	Sameer	solo
Kshatriya	729	"Main Khichi Chali Aayee"	Laxmikant-Pyarelal		solo
Lootere	730	"Main Teri Rani"	Anand–Milind	Dharmesh Darshan	solo
Lootere	731	"Mujhe Le Chal Mandir"	Anand–Milind	Manoj Kumar	Pankaj Udhas
Lootere	732	"Meri Barbaad Mohabbat Pukare"	Anand–Milind	Majrooh Sultanpuri	Mohammed Aziz
Mahakaal	733	"Jaanejaan Bahon Mein Aa"	Anand–Milind	Kafil Azar	solo
Pehchaan	734	"Nazuk Nazuk Nazuk"	Anand–Milind	Sameer	Udit Narayan
Phir Teri Kahani Yaad Aayee	735	"Dil Mein Sanam Ki Soorat"	Anu Malik	Sameer	Kumar Sanu
Phir Teri Kahani Yaad Aayee	736	"Baadalon Mein Chup Raha Chand"	Anu Malik	Sameer	Kumar Sanu
Phir Teri Kahani Yaad Aayee	737	"Sairana Si Hai"	Anu Malik	Sameer	solo
Phir Teri Kahani Yaad Aayee	738	"Dil Deta Hai Ro Ro"	Anu Malik	Sameer	solo
Phoolan Hasina Ramkali	739	"Phoolan Hasina Ramkali"	Dilip Sen-Sameer Sen		Sadhana Sargam, Kavita Krishnamurthy
Platform	740	"Khamoshi Thi Mach Gaya Shor"	Anand–Milind	Sameer	solo
Platform	741	"Main Shama Tu Parwana"	Anand–Milind	Sameer	Udit Narayan
Police Wala	742	"Mera Laila"	Bappi Lahiri		solo
Professor Ki Padosan	743	"Model Girl"	R. D. Burman	Gulshan Bawra	Sudesh Bhosale
Professor Ki Padosan	744	"Aisi Jaldi Bhi Hai Kya"	R. D. Burman	Gulshan Bawra	Kavita Krishnamurthy
Rang	745	"Teri Mohabbat Ne"	Nadeem-Shravan	Sameer	Kumar Sanu
Rang	746	"Hum Tum Picture"	Nadeem-Shravan	Sameer	Udit Narayan
Rang	747	"Mere Pyaar Ka Hisab"	Nadeem-Shravan	Sameer	Kumar Sanu
Rang	748	"Tujhe Na Dekhu"	Nadeem-Shravan	Sameer	Kumar Sanu
Rang	749	"Tumhein Dekhen Meri Aankhein"	Nadeem-Shravan	Sameer	Kumar Sanu, P. Sunanda
Rang	750	"Coming Coming Coming"	Nadeem-Shravan	Sameer	solo
Rang	751	"Dil Cheer Ke Dekh" (Female version)	Nadeem-Shravan	Sameer	solo
Sainik	752	"Humko Hua Hai Pyaar"	Nadeem-Shravan	Sameer	Vinod Rathod
Sainik	753	"Baabul Ka Ghar"	Nadeem-Shravan	Sameer	Kumar Sanu
Sangram	754	"Udte Baadal Se Poochho"	Nadeem-Shravan	Sameer	solo
Sangram	755	"Sajna Ban Ke Phirun"	Nadeem-Shravan	Sameer	Sunanda
Sangram	756	"Beshak Tum Meri Mohabbat Ho"	Nadeem-Shravan	Sameer	Kumar Sanu
Sangram	757	"Sorry Sorry Sorry"	Nadeem-Shravan	Sameer	Mukul Aggarwal
Santaan	758	"Kaaton Ko Samjho Na"	Anand–Milind	Sameer	Kumar Sanu
Santaan	759	"Zabaan Zabaan Pe Hogi"	Anand–Milind	Sameer	Kumar Sanu
Santaan	760	"Dilon Mein Duaein" (female)	Anand–Milind	Sameer	solo
Santaan	761	"College Mein Honi Chahiye"	Anand–Milind	Sameer	Udit Narayan
Shreemaan Aashique	762	"Chum Loon Honth Tere"	Nadeem-Shravan	Sameer	Kumar Sanu
Shreemaan Aashique	763	"Dekha Jabse Tujhe"	Nadeem-Shravan	Sameer	Kumar Sanu
Sir	764	"Yeh Ujli Chandni"	Anu Malik	Qateel Shifai	Kumar Sanu
Sir	765	"Odh Ke Andhera"	Anu Malik	Qateel Shifai	solo
Tadipaar	766	"Aaj Pehli Baar Dil Ki Baat"	Nadeem-Shravan	Sameer	Kumar Sanu
Tadipaar	767	"Bikhri Zulfon Ko Sajane"	Nadeem-Shravan	Sameer	Kumar Sanu
Tadipaar	768	"Yeh Zindagi Kabhi Kabhi"	Nadeem-Shravan	Sameer	S. P. Balasubrahmanyam
Tadipaar	769	"Aap Ki Dosti Kubool"	Nadeem-Shravan	Sameer	solo
Tadipaar	770	"O Saiya Saiya"	Nadeem-Shravan	Sameer	Vinod Rathod
Tahqiqaat	771	"Dil Ko Bewajah"	Anu Malik	Faiz Anwar	Abhijeet
Veerta	772	"Kanna Vati"	Bappi Lahiri	Ajit Singh Deol	Amit Kumar
Veerta	773	"Badhai Badhai"	Bappi Lahiri	Ajit Singh Deol	Kavita Krishnamurthy
Waqt Hamara Hai	774	"Kami Nahin Hai Ladkiyon Ki"	Nadeem-Shravan	Sameer	Udit Narayan, Vinod Rathod, Mitalee Choudhary
Waqt Hamara Hai	775	"Yeh Waqt Hamara Hai"	Nadeem-Shravan	Sameer	Kumar Sanu, Sudesh Bhosale
Waqt Hamara Hai	776	"Maine Pee Ya Tu Ne Pee"	Nadeem-Shravan	Sameer	Mohammad Aziz
Waqt Hamara Hai	777	"Mausam Hai Mastana"	Nadeem-Shravan	Sameer	Udit Narayan
Waqt Hamara Hai	778	"Haan Ji Haan Maaf Karna"	Nadeem-Shravan	Sameer	Kavita Krishnamurthy, Anupam Kher
Waqt Hamara Hai	779	"Tumko Dekha Aur Ho Gaya"	Nadeem-Shravan	Sameer	Kumar Sanu
Yugandhar	780	"Chubhte Hai Phool Mujhe"	Laxmikant-Pyarelal	Rajesh Malik	Vinod Rathod
Zakhmo Ka Hisaab	781	"Ek Raaz Hai"	Rajesh Roshan	Anwar Sagar	Simmi Sinha

=== 1994 ===
Film	No	Song	Composer(s)	Writer(s)	Co-artist(s)
Aag	782	"Yeh Kanya Kunwari Hai"	Dilip Sen - Sameer Sen	Sameer	Hariharan, Sudesh Bhosle
Aag	783	"Ankhon Mein Tum Hi"	Dilip Sen - Sameer Sen	Sameer	Kumar Sanu
Aag	784	"Tera Kya Lagta Hai"	Dilip Sen - Sameer Sen	Sameer	Sonu Nigam, Ila Arun
Aag Aur Chingari	785	"Tumko Mujhse Pyaar Hai"	Bappi Lahiri	Anwar Sagar, Nawab Arzoo	Kumar Sanu
Aaja Mere Mehboob	786	"Hum Do Premi"	S. G. Varma	Sudhakar Sharma	Kumar Sanu
Aao Pyaar Karen	787	"Jab Do Dil Milte Hain"	Aadesh Shrivastava	Shayam Raj	Kumar Sanu
Aatish: Feel the Fire	788	"Dheela Pajama"	Nadeem-Shravan	Sameer	Kumar Sanu
Aatish: Feel the Fire	789	"Khaate Hain Hum Kasam"	Nadeem-Shravan	Sameer	Kumar Sanu
Aatish: Feel the Fire	790	"Baarish Ne Aag Lagayi"	Nadeem-Shravan	Sameer	Udit Narayan
Aatish: Feel the Fire	791	"Dil Dil Dil"	Nadeem-Shravan	Sameer	Jolly Mukherjee
Aatish: Feel the Fire	792	"Ya Dilruba"	Nadeem-Shravan	Sameer	Jolly Mukherjee, Mukul Aggarwal
Amaanat	793	"Din Mein Leti Hai" (female)	Bappi Lahiri	Anwar Sagar	Ila Arun
Amaanat	794	"Din Mein Leti Hai" (duet)	Bappi Lahiri	Anwar Sagar	Kumar Sanu, Ila Arun
Amaanat	795	"Din Mein Kehti Hai"	Bappi Lahiri	Anwar Sagar	Ila Arun, Babul Supriyo
Amaanat	796	"La Doonga"	Bappi Lahiri	Ravi Anand	Babul Supriyo
Amaanat	797	"Daloonga Daloonga"	Bappi Lahiri	Ravi Anand	Kumar Sanu
Amaanat	798	"Tujhse Milna Milkar Chalna"	Bappi Lahiri	Indeevar	Kumar Sanu
Andaz	799	"Laila Bechari Ka"	Bappi Lahiri	Indeevar	Kumar Sanu, Sudesh Bhosle
Andaz	800	"Kuku Kuku"	Bappi Lahiri	Indeevar	Kumar Sanu
Andaz	801	"Nacho Gao"	Bappi Lahiri	Indeevar	Vinod Rathod
Andaz Tera Mastana	802	"Tum Mujhe Itna Pyaar"	Anand–Milind	Sameer	Kumar Sanu
Anjaam	803	"Barson Ke Baad"	Anand–Milind	Sameer	solo
Anjaam	804	"Sun Meri Bano"	Anand–Milind	Sameer	solo
Anjaam	805	"Tu Samne Jab"	Anand–Milind	Sameer	Udit Narayan
Anokha Premyudh	806	"O Preeti"	Manoj Saran	Manoj Saran	Kumar Sanu
Baali Umar Ko Salaam	807	"Meri Zindagi Teri Chaahat"	Bappi Lahiri		solo
Baali Umar Ko Salaam	808	"Ding Dong"	Bappi Lahiri		Kumar Sanu
Brahma	809	"Pyaar Ka Zamana"	Bappi Lahiri		Kumar Sanu
Brahma	810	"Pehle Pehle Pyar Ka"	Bappi Lahiri		Kumar Sanu
Brahma	811	"Chehre Padh Leta Hai"	Bappi Lahiri		Udit Narayan
Chauraha	812	"I Love You"	Laxmikant-Pyarelal		Vinod Rathod
Cheetah	813	"Ae Kudi Mera"	Jatin-Lalit	Dev Kohli	Kumar Sanu
Cheetah	814	"Yeh Tera Sajna Savarna"	Jatin-Lalit	Anwar Sagar	Kumar Sanu
Cheetah	815	"Meri Chunri Lehrayee"	Jatin-Lalit	Zameer Kazmi	solo
Chhoti Bahu	816	"Ab To Baharen Bhi"	Nadeem-Shravan	Sameer	solo
Chhoti Bahu	817	"Tumse Bichhadke"	Nadeem-Shravan	Sameer	solo
Chhoti Bahu	818	"Kha Kasam"	Nadeem-Shravan	Sameer	Kumar Sanu
Dharam Yoddha	819	"Ek Do Teen Char"	K. Kappu		Jolly Mukherjee
Dilwale	820	"Saaton Janam Mein Tere"	Nadeem-Shravan	Sameer	Kumar Sanu
Dilwale	821	"Jeeta Hoon Jiske Liye"	Nadeem-Shravan	Sameer	Kumar Sanu
Dilwale	822	"Jeeta Tha Jiske Liye"	Nadeem-Shravan	Sameer	Kumar Sanu
Dilwale	823	"Mauka Milega To Hum"	Nadeem-Shravan	Sameer	Udit Narayan
Do Fantoosh	824	"Lai Lo"	Hari-Arjun	Qamar Jalalabadi	Amjad Khan
Do Fantoosh	825	"Meri Padosan Jawaan Ho Gayi"	Hari-Arjun	Sikander Bharti	Udit Narayan
Dulaara	826	"Tumhi Se Tumhi Ko"	Nikhil-Vinay		Kumar Sanu
Dulaara	827	"Dil Yahin Kahin Kho Gaya"	Nikhil-Vinay		Kumar Sanu
Dulaara	828	"Sajan Re Sajan"	Nikhil-Vinay		Kumar Sanu
Dulaara	829	"Kal Kahin College Mein"	Nikhil-Vinay		Udit Narayan
Dulaara	830	"Silsila Shuru Hua"	Nikhil-Vinay		Udit Narayan
Dulaara	831	"Mera Pant Bhi Sexy"	Nikhil-Vinay		Govinda
Ekka Raja Rani	832	"Yeh Neeli Neeli Chudiyan"	Nadeem-Shravan	Sameer	Udit Narayan
Ekka Raja Rani	833	"Dil Ko Zara Sa Aaram" (duet)	Nadeem-Shravan	Sameer	Kumar Sanu
Ekka Raja Rani	834	"Tadpun Ya Pyaar Karun"	Nadeem-Shravan	Sameer	solo
Ekka Raja Rani	835	"Dil Milne Ko Tarasta Hai"	Nadeem-Shravan	Sameer	Vinod Rathod
Ekka Raja Rani	836	"Pyar Karo To"	Nadeem-Shravan	Sameer	Kumar Sanu, Udit Narayan
Gangster	837	"Ab Hamen Tumse"	Jatin-Lalit		Vinod Rathod
Gopalaa	838	"I am a Beautiful Miss"	Nadeem-Shravan	Sameer	solo
Gopalaa	839	"Premika Premika"	Nadeem-Shravan	Dev Kohli	Amit Kumar
Gopi Kishan	840	"Yeh Ishq Hai Kya"	Anand–Milind	Sameer	Kumar Sanu
Gopi Kishan	841	"Batti Na Bujha"	Anand–Milind	Sameer	Kumar Sanu
Hum Hain Bemisaal	842	"Chahe Chooti Tut Jaye"	Anu Malik	Shyam Anuragi, Kulwant Jani	solo
Hum Hain Bemisaal	843	"Duma Dum Mast Kalandar"	Anu Malik	Baba Sehgal, Qateel Shifai	Baba Sehgal
Imtihaan	844	"Dheere Dheere Chori Chori"	Anu Malik	Faiz Anwar	Amit Kumar
Imtihaan	845	"Chura Ke Daman"	Anu Malik	Faiz Anwar	Kumar Sanu
Insaaf Apne Lahoo Se	846	"Ankhon Mein Sanson Mein"	Laxmikant-Pyarelal	Sameer, Hassan Kamal, Dev Kohli	Kavita Krishnamurthy, Mohammad Aziz
Insaaf Apne Lahoo Se	847	"Athanni Chawanni"	Laxmikant-Pyarelal	Sameer, Hassan Kamal, Dev Kohli	Jolly Mukherjee
Jai Kishen	848	"Pyaar Hua Hai Jabse"	Anand–Milind	Sameer	Kumar Sanu
Janta Ki Adalat	849	"Dil Mein Kya Hai"	Bappi Lahiri	Maya Govind, Nawab Arzoo, Anwar Sagar	Roop Kumar Rathod
Kabhi Haan Kabhi Naa	850	"Aana Mere Pyaar Ko Tum"	Jatin-Lalit	Majrooh Sultanpuri	Kumar Sanu
Kabhi Haan Kabhi Naa	851	"Sachi Yeh Kahani Hai"	Jatin-Lalit	Majrooh Sultanpuri	Amit Kumar
Karan	852	"Kab Tak Pyaar Chhupaoge"	Raam Laxman	Dev Kohli	Kumar Sanu
Khuddar	853	"Tumsa Koi Pyara"	Anu Malik	Sameer	Kumar Sanu
Khuddar	854	"Woh Ankh Hi Kya"	Anu Malik	Sameer	Kumar Sanu
Khuddar	855	"Tum Mano Ya Na Mano"	Anu Malik	Sameer	Kumar Sanu
Khuddar	856	"Tere Deewane Ne"	Anu Malik	Sameer	Kumar Sanu
Khuddar	857	"Khat Likha Humne"	Anu Malik	Sameer	Sonu Nigam
Khuddar	858	"Raat Kya Maange"	Anu Malik	Sameer	solo
Krantiveer	859	"Jabse Hum Tere"	Anand–Milind	Sameer	Kumar Sanu
Laadla	860	"Meri Dhadkan Suno"	Anand–Milind	Sameer	Udit Narayan
Laadla	861	"Mere Ghulam Tera" (duet)	Anand–Milind	Sameer	Udit Narayan
Laadla	862	Mere Ghulam Tera" (female)	Anand–Milind	Sameer	solo
Laqshya	863	"Yeh Dil Sanam Tumhare"	Jatin-Lalit	Anwar Sagar	Kumar Sanu
Laqshya	864	"Tumhare Paas Aane Se"	Jatin-Lalit	Madan Pal	Kumar Sanu
Laqshya	865	"Tum Humko"	Jatin-Lalit	Rani Malik	Kumar Sanu
Laqshya	866	"Pyar Karte Hain Hum"	Jatin-Lalit	Rani Malik	Abhijeet Bhattacharya
Madam X	867	"Shaafi Shuda Mardon Ko"	Anu Malik	Sameer	solo
Madam X	868	"Kaise Dil Jeete Aapka"	Anu Malik	Sameer	solo
Main Khiladi Tu Anari	869	"Zuban Khamosh"	Anu Malik	Rani Malik	Kumar Sanu
Main Khiladi Tu Anari	870	"Chura Ke Dil Mera"	Anu Malik	Rani Malik	Kumar Sanu
Main Khiladi Tu Anari	871	"Zara Zara"	Anu Malik	Hasrat Jaipuri	Kumar Sanu
Main Khiladi Tu Anari	872	"Dil Ka Darwaza"	Anu Malik	Rahat Indori	solo
Mere Humsafar	873	"Aa Jaa Jaane Jaa"	Triveni-Bhavani	Rani Malik, P. K. Mishra, Indeevar, Dev Kohli, K Pappu	Kumar Sanu
Mere Humsafar	874	"Deewana Dil Tera"	Triveni-Bhavani	Rani Malik, P. K. Mishra, Indeevar, Dev Kohli, K Pappu	Kumar Sanu
Mere Humsafar	875	"Yeh Mausam Hai"	Triveni-Bhavani	Rani Malik, P. K. Mishra, Indeevar, Dev Kohli, K Pappu	Jolly Mukherjee
Mohabbat Ki Aarzoo	876	"Kyon Humko Neend Nahin Aati"	Laxmikant-Pyarelal	Rani Malik	Udit Narayan
Mohabbat Ki Aarzoo	877	"Tum Humse Pyaar Kar Lo"	Laxmikant-Pyarelal	Kulwant Jani	Udit Narayan
Mohabbat Ki Aarzoo	878	"Tum Humse Pyaar Kar Lo" (part 2)	Laxmikant-Pyarelal	Kulwant Jani	Udit Narayan
Mohini	879	"Viraha Dasha Meri"	Ravindra Jain	Ravindra Jain	K. J. Yesudas
Mohra	880	"Tip Tip Barsa Paani"	Viju Shah	Anand Bakshi	Udit Narayan
Mohra	881	"Dil Har Koi"	Viju Shah	Indeevar	Kumar Sanu
Mr. Azaad	882	"Tu Jhumta Hua Saawan"	Bappi Lahiri	Indeevar	Kumar Sanu
Mr. Azaad	883	"Main Teri Chanchal Titli"	Bappi Lahiri	Indeevar	Kumar Sanu
Mr. Azaad	884	"Diya Diya Dil Diya"	Bappi Lahiri	Indeevar	Kumar Sanu
Naaraaz	885	"Agar Aasmaan Tak"	Anu Malik	Zameer Kazmi	Mukul Aggarwal
Paramaatma	886	"Tune Mera Dil"	Bappi Lahiri		Kumar Sanu
Paramaatma	887	"Tu Tu Turu"	Bappi Lahiri		solo
Path-Bhrashta	888	"Deewangi Ki Raah Pe" (female)	Usha Khanna		solo
Pathreela Raasta	889	"Main Hoon Tera"	Raam Laxman	Rani Malik	Kumar Sanu
Pathreela Raasta	890	"Kangana Pehna De"	Raam Laxman	Maya Govind	Kumar Sanu
Pathreela Raasta	891	"Aag Laga Ke"	Raam Laxman		Kumar Sanu
Pathreela Raasta	892	Aaj Nachte Huwe"	Raam Laxman	Ravindra Rawal	solo
Pehla Pehla Pyar	893	"Maine Kahi Na"	Anand–Milind	Anand Bakshi	Kumar Sanu
Pehla Pehla Pyar	894	"Mujhse Pyar Karegi"	Anand–Milind	Anand Bakshi	Udit Narayan
Pehla Pehla Pyar	895	"Kora Kagaz Pe Likhwale"	Anand–Milind	Anand Bakshi	Suresh Wadkar
Pehla Pehla Pyar	896	"Thandi Hawa Sun"	Anand–Milind	Anand Bakshi	solo
Pyar Ka Rog	897	"Ja Ja Ke Kahaan"	Bappi Lahiri	Rani Malik	Kumar Sanu
Pyar Ka Rog	898	"Ja Ja Ke Kahaan" (version 2)	Bappi Lahiri	Rani Malik	Kumar Sanu
Qaidi No. 36	899	Saajan Tu Mere Baat Maan Le"	Bappi Lahiri	Kasif	solo
Raat Ke Gunaah	900	"Gale Aake Lagja"	Anand–Milind	Maya Govind	solo
Raat Ke Gunaah	901	"Raat Hai Chand Hai"	Anand–Milind	Maya Govind	solo
Raat Ke Gunaah	903	"Love"	Anand–Milind	Maya Govind	solo
Raat Ke Gunaah	904	"Duniya Se Chup Chupke"	Anand–Milind	Maya Govind	Udit Narayan
Rakhwale	905	"Aise Mausam Mein Deewani"	Sonik-Omi	Kulwant Jani	solo
Saajan Ka Ghar	906	"Apni Bhi Zindagi Mein"	Nadeem-Shravan	Sameer	Kumar Sanu
Saajan Ka Ghar	907	"Main Karti Hoon Tujhe Pyar"	Nadeem-Shravan	Sameer	Kumar Sanu
Saajan Ka Ghar	908	"Nazar Jeedhar Jeedhar Jaye"	Nadeem-Shravan	Sameer	Kumar Sanu
Saajan Ka Ghar	909	"Babul De Do Dua"	Nadeem-Shravan	Sameer	Suresh Wadkar
Saajan Ka Ghar	910	"Bojh Se Gamon Ke"	Nadeem-Shravan	Sameer	solo
Saajan Ka Ghar	911	"Chandi Ki Dori"	Nadeem-Shravan	Sameer	solo
Saajan Ka Ghar	912	"Rab Ne Bhi Mujh Pe Sitam"	Nadeem-Shravan	Sameer	solo
Saboot Maangta Hai Qanoon	913	"Aa Jappi Pale"	Kalyanji-Anandji	Mahender Dalvi	Amit Kumar
Saboot Maangta Hai Qanoon	914	"Pee Le Pee Le"	Kalyanji-Anandji	Mahender Dalvi	solo
Saboot Maangta Hai Qanoon	915	"Ya Qurbaan"	Kalyanji-Anandji	Mahender Dalvi	Suresh Wadkar, Sadhana Sargam
Salaami	916	"Tumhe Chhede Hawa"	Nadeem-Shravan	Sameer	Kumar Sanu
Salaami	917	"Bas Ek Tamanna Hai"	Nadeem-Shravan	Sameer	Kumar Sanu
Salaami	918	"Mile Tumse Bichhadke Hum"	Nadeem-Shravan	Sameer	Kumar Sanu, Kavita Krishnamurthy
Salaami	919	"Dil Jabse Toot Gaya" (duet)	Nadeem-Shravan	Sameer	Pankaj Udhaas
Salaami	920	"Jab Haal-E-Dil" (happy)	Nadeem-Shravan	Sameer	solo
Salaami	921	"Jab Haal-E-Dil" (sad)	Nadeem-Shravan	Sameer	solo
Sangdil Sanam	922	"Ankhon Mein Band" (sad)	Anand–Milind	Sameer	Amit Kumar
Stumtman	923	"Aaj Mile Ho"	Nadeem-Shravan	Sameer	Kumar Sanu
Stumtman	924	"Aati Hai Teri Yaad"	Nadeem-Shravan	Sameer	Kumar Sanu
Stumtman	925	"Yeh Ankhen Hai Aaina"	Nadeem-Shravan	Sameer	Kumar Sanu
Stumtman	926	"Zindagi Kya Hai Ek Nagma"	Nadeem-Shravan	Sameer	Kumar Sanu
Stumtman	927	"Amma Dekh Tera Munda"	Nadeem-Shravan	Sameer	Bali Brahmabhatt
Suhaag	928	"Main Dekhun Tumhe"	Anand–Milind	Sameer	Udit Narayan
Suhaag	929	"Kagaz Kalam"	Anand–Milind	Sameer	Udit Narayan
Suhaag	930	"Gore Gore Mukhde Pe"	Anand–Milind	Sameer	Udit Narayan
Suhaag	931	"Yeh Nakhra Ladki Ka"	Anand–Milind	Sameer	Kumar Sanu, Udit Narayan
Teesra Kaun	932	"Kya Aankhen Hai"	Anand–Milind	Sameer	Abhijeet
Udhaar Ki Zindagi	933	"Dil Dhadakne Ka Bahana"	Anand–Milind	Sameer	Kumar Sanu
Udhaar Ki Zindagi	934	"Humne To Lee Hai Kasam"	Anand–Milind	Sameer	Kumar Sanu
Vijaypath	935	"Sagar Sang Kinare Hai"	Anu Malik	Shaily Shailendra	Kumar Sanu
Vijaypath	936	"Raah Mein Unse"	Anu Malik	Zameer Kazmi	Kumar Sanu
Yaar Gaddar	937	"Mere Saamne Hai"	Anu Malik	Qatil Shifai	Kumar Sanu
Yaar Gaddar	938	"Tum Hi Tum Ho"	Anu Malik	Dev Kohli, Pooja Ahuja	Kumar Sanu
Yaar Gaddar	939	"Mujhe Aarzoo Thi Jisko"	Anu Malik	Qatil Shifai	solo
Yaar Gaddar	940	Mere Dil Mein Hai Kuchh"	Anu Malik	Pooja Ahuja	Udit Narayan
Zaalim	941	"Pehle Hi Qayamat"	Anu Malik	Israr Ansari	Vinod Rathod
Zaalim	942	"Mubarak Ho Mohabbat" (duet)	Anu Malik	Zafar Gorakhpuri	Kumar Sanu
Zamane Se Kya Darna	943	"Aankhon Se Hum"	Anand–Milind	Sameer	Kumar Sanu

=== 1995 ===
Film	No	Song	Composer(s)	Writer(s)	Co-artist(s)
Aatank Hi Aatank	944	"Ek Dujhe Pe Marne Wale"	Bappi Lahiri	Naqsh Lyallpuri, Anwar Sagar, Bali Brahmabhatt, Shaily Shailendra, Sanam Gazipuri	Bappi Lahiri
Aazmayish	945	"Kanta Lage"	Anand–Milind	Anand Bakshi	Sonu Nigam
Aazmayish	946	"Mera Dil Kho Gaya"	Anand–Milind	Anand Bakshi	Sonu Nigam
Aazmayish	947	"Yaar Mat Ja Re"	Anand–Milind	Anand Bakshi	Sonu Nigam
Aazmayish	948	"Dhoondh Rahe Hain"	Anand–Milind	Anand Bakshi	solo
Ab Insaf Hoga	949	"Barson Ke Baad Maine"	Anand–Milind	Anand Bakshi	solo
Ab Insaf Hoga	950	"Yeh Behki Behki Chaal"	Anand–Milind	Anand Bakshi	Kumar Sanu
Ahankaar	951	"Teri Amdar Meri Jaan"	Anu Malik	Sameer	Udit Narayan
Akele Hum Akele Tum	952	"Raja Ko Rani Se Pyar Ho Gaya"	Anu Malik	Majrooh Sultanpuri	Udit Narayan
Akele Hum Akele Tum	953	"Dil Kehta Hai"	Anu Malik	Majrooh Sultanpuri	Kumar Sanu
Akele Hum Akele Tum	954	"Raja Ko Rani Se Pyar Ho Gaya" (version 2)	Anu Malik	Majrooh Sultanpuri	Kumar Sanu
Andolan	955	"Dil To Khoya Hai"	Nadeem-Shravan	Sameer	Kumar Sanu
Andolan	956	"Dil Humne Diya"	Nadeem-Shravan	Sameer	Kumar Sanu
Andolan	957	"Kitne Dinon Ke Baad"	Nadeem-Shravan	Sameer	Kumar Sanu
Andolan	958	"Aayegi Har Pal"	Nadeem-Shravan	Sameer	Kumar Sanu
Andolan	959	"Mujhe To Hone Laga"	Nadeem-Shravan	Sameer	Kumar Sanu, Udit Narayan
Angrakshak	960	"Dil Mera Churane Laga"	Anand–Milind	Sameer	Kumar Sanu
Angrakshak	961	"Haule Haule Dil Dole"	Anand–Milind	Sameer	Udit Narayan
Angrakshak	962	Aa Ab Aa Sun Le Sada Dil Ki"	Anand–Milind	Sameer	solo
Anokha Andaz	963	"Tu Deewana Paagal"	Anand Raj Anand	Sameer	Kumar Sanu
Anokha Andaz	964	"Mausam Aashikana Hai"	Anand Raj Anand	Sameer	Kumar Sanu
Anokha Andaz	965	"Aap Se Pehle"	Anand Raj Anand	Sameer	Vinod Rathod
Barsaat	966	"Humko Sirf Tumse Pyaar Hai"	Nadeem-Shravan	Sameer	Kumar Sanu
Barsaat	967	"Love Tujhe Love"	Nadeem-Shravan	Sameer	Kumar Sanu
Barsaat	968	"Ek Haseen Ladki Se"	Nadeem-Shravan	Sameer	Sonu Nigam
Bedardi Sanam	969	"Neendein Meri Churake"	Jolly Mukherjee	N/A	Nitin Mukesh
Cinema Cinema	970	"Cinema Cinema" (part 1)	Laxmikant-Pyarelal	Javed Akhtar	Udit Narayan, Sudesh Bhosle
Cinema Cinema	971	"Cinema Cinema" (part 2)	Laxmikant-Pyarelal	Javed Akhtar	Udit Narayan, Sudesh Bhosle
Cinema Cinema	972	"Saraswati Vandana"	Laxmikant-Pyarelal	N/A	solo
Cinema Cinema	973	"Tribute to Legendary Music Composers"	Anu Malik	N/A	Sadhana Sargam
Coolie No. 1	974	"Mein To Raste Se Ja Rahi Thi"	Anand–Milind	Sameer	Kumar Sanu
Coolie No. 1	975	"Aaja Na"	Anand–Milind	Sameer	Kumar Sanu
Coolie No. 1	976	"Tere Pyaar Mein"	Anand–Milind	Sameer	Udit Narayan
Criminal	977	"Tu Mile Dil Khile"(Duet)	M. M. Kreem	Indeevar	Kumar Sanu
Criminal	978	"Janu Janu Janu"	M. M. Kreem	Indeevar	Kumar Sanu
Criminal	979	"Keemti Keemti"	M. M. Kreem	Indeevar	K. S. Chithra, S. P. Balasubrahmanyam
Criminal	980	"Tu Mile Dil Khile"(Female)	M. M. Kreem	Indeevar	solo
Dilbar	981	"Dilbar Dilbar"	Laxmikant-Pyarelal	Anand Bakshi	Vinod Rathod
Dilbar	982	"Sabhi Ko Khuda Ki"	Laxmikant-Pyarelal	Anand Bakshi	Kumar Sanu
Dilbar	983	"Paon Mein Payal"	Laxmikant-Pyarelal	Anand Bakshi	solo
Dilbar	984	"Main Athara Baras Ki"	Laxmikant-Pyarelal	Anand Bakshi	Udit Narayan
Diya Aur Toofan	985	"Ek Diya Aur Toofan"	Bappi Lahiri	Maya Govind	solo
Dushmani	986	"Ladki Kunwari Thi"	Anand–Milind	Sameer	Kumar Sanu
Faraar	987	"Dheere Dheere Haule Haule"	Anand–Milind	Sameer	Kumar Sanu
Gaddaar	988	"Baraste Pani Ka"	Nadeem-Shravan	Sameer	Babul Supriyo
Gaddaar	989	"Tumse Milne Ko"	Nadeem-Shravan	Sameer	Kumar Sanu
Gambler	990	"Yaar Daakiye Mere Kabootar"	Anu Malik	Dev Kohli	Kumar Sanu
Gambler	991	"Deewangi Ko Tu Meri Pehchaan Jaayegi"	Anu Malik	Faiz Anwar	Vinod Rathod
Ghar Ka Kanoon	992	"Dekho Zara Dekho"	Sapan-Jagmohan	Ramnath Shukla	Kumar Sanu
Ghar Ka Kanoon	993	"Chham Chham Payal Bole"	Sapan-Jagmohan	Ramnath Shukla	Kumar Sanu
Gunda Mawali	994	"Raju Awara Barsaat Mein"	Jatin-Lalit	Dev Kohli	Kumar Sanu
Gundaraj	995	"Cham Ke Dhup"	Anu Malik	Rahat Indori	Kumar Sanu
Gunehgar	996	"Dil Hua Beqaraar Aahista Aahista"	Shyam-Surender	Maan Singh Deep	Kumar Sanu
Gunehgar	997	"Waada Karo Ye"	Shyam-Surender	Maan Singh Deep	Kumar Sanu
Haqeeqat	998	"Main Tera Dil Mein"	Dilip Sen-Sameer Sen	Rani Malik	Kumar Sanu
Haqeeqat	999	"Mele Lage Huye"	Dilip Sen-Sameer Sen	Rani Malik	Kumar Sanu
Haqeeqat	1000	"O Jaane Jaan"	Dilip Sen-Sameer Sen	Gulshan Bawra	Kumar Sanu
Haqeeqat	1001	"Le Pappiyan"	Dilip Sen-Sameer Sen	Gulshan Bawra	Kumar Sanu
Haqeeqat	1002	"Dil Ne Dil Se"	Dilip Sen-Sameer Sen	Nawab Arzoo	Hariharan
Haqeeqat	1003	"Ek Ladki Hai"	Dilip Sen-Sameer Sen	Faiz Anwar	Udit Narayan
Hulchul	1004	"Tu Mere Man Ki"	Anu Malik	Kulwant Jani	Kumar Sanu
Hulchul	1005	"Pehli Dafaa Is Dil Mein"	Anu Malik	Faaiz Anwar	Kumar Sanu
Hum Dono	1006	"Aya Mausam"	Anand–Milind	Sameer	Udit Narayan
Hum Dono	1007	"Ek Ladki Hia Deewani Si"	Anand–Milind	Sameer	Kumar Sanu
Hum Sub Chor Hain	1008	"Sawli Saloni"	Bappi Lahiri	Nawab Arzoo	Kumar Sanu
Hum Sub Chor Hain	1009	"Sawli Saloni" (version 2)	Bappi Lahiri	Nawab Arzoo	Vital Signs
Hum Sub Chor Hain	1010	"Meri Biwi Lakhon"	Bappi Lahiri	Nawab Arzoo	Vinod Rathod
Jaadu	1011	"Naam Tera"	Nadeem-Shravan	Sameer	Kumar Sanu
Jaadu	1012	"Dheere Dheere"	Nadeem-Shravan	Sameer	Kumar Sanu
Jai Vikraanta	1013	"Pyaar Ikraar Mere Yaar""	Anand–Milind	Sameer	Kumar Sanu
Jai Vikraanta	1014	"Dekhke Mera"	Anand–Milind	Sameer	solo
Jai Vikraanta	1015	"Kothe Upar Kothari"	Anand–Milind	Sameer	solo
Jallaad	1016	"Bichuva Bole"	Anand–Milind	Sameer	solo
Janam Kundli	1017	"Pyar Ho Gaya"	Anand–Milind	Sameer	Udit Narayan
Kaala Sach	1018	"Ghadi Se Meri Ghadi"	Vijaya Dauada	M. G. Hashmat	Naveen Kumar
Kalyug Ke Avtaar	1019	"Ik Mera Dil Ik Tera"	Ravindra Jain	Ravindra Jain	solo
Karan Arjun	1020	"Mujhko Ranaji Maaf Karna"	Rajesh Roshan	Indeevar	Ila Arun
Karan Arjun	1021	"Jaati Hoon Main"	Rajesh Roshan	Indeevar	Kumar Sanu
Karan Arjun	1022	"Jai Maa Kali"	Rajesh Roshan	Indeevar	Kumar Sanu
Karan Arjun	1023	"Yeh Bandhan To"	Rajesh Roshan	Indeevar	Kumar Sanu, Udit Narayan
Kartavya	1024	"Dhadakta Tha Pehle Dil Mera"	Dilip Sen-Sameer Sen	Sameer	Kumar Sanu
Kartavya	1025	"Pyaar Mein Dil Ka Murga"	Dilip Sen-Sameer Sen	Sameer	Kumar Sanu
Kartavya	1026	"Yeh Dil Ki Dhadkan Kya"	Dilip Sen-Sameer Sen	Sameer	Kumar Sanu
Kartavya	1027	"Hame Kya Khabar Thee"	Dilip Sen-Sameer Sen	Sameer	Kumar Sanu
Kismat	1028	"Yeh Kya Mujhko"	Anand–Milind	Sameer	Kumar Sanu
Kismat	1029	"Yeh Kya Mujhko"	Anand–Milind	Sameer	Udit Narayan
Lady Robinhood	1030	"Mera Gaal Hai Gulaabi"	Bappi Lahiri	Indeevar, Mahender Dalvi	solo
Maidan-E-Jung	1031	"Kya Baat Hai"	Bappi Lahiri	Maya Govind	Kumar Sanu
Meru Mohabbat Mera Naseeba	1032	"Sabse Badi Daulat"	Anand–Milind	Sameer	Kumar Sanu
Naajayaz	1033	"Kya Tum Mujshe Pyar Karte Ho"	Anu Malik	Indeevar	Kumar Sanu
Naajayaz	1034	"Tujhe Pyaar Karte Karte"	Anu Malik	Rahat Indori	Anu Malik
Naajayaz	1035	"Ek Kadam Tera Ek Kadam Mera"	Anu Malik	Rahat Indori	Kumar Sanu
Naajayaz	1036	"Lal Lal Hoton Pe"	Anu Malik	Indeevar	Kumar Sanu
Naajayaz	1037	"Neend Ke Maare"	Anu Malik	Pushpa Verma & Maya Govind	Ila Arun
Nishana	1038	"Saamne Baithi Raho"	Jatin-Lalit	Sameer	Kumar Sanu
Nishana	1039	"Pyar Hi Pyar Hai"	Jatin-Lalit	Sameer	Kumar Sanu
Nishana	1040	"Ankhon Mein Ansoo"	Jatin-Lalit	Sameer	Paresh Rawal
Nishana	1041	"Hamesha Muskurate Rahenge"	Jatin-Lalit	Sameer	solo
Paandav	1042	"Tere Liye Rehta Hai"	Jatin-Lalit	Vinod Mahendra	Kumar Sanu
Paappi Devataa	1043	"Jhoom Raha Hai"	Laxmikant-Pyarelal	Anand Bakshi	Shabbir Kumar
Paappi Devataa	1044	"Sawan Ke Badalon Ki"	Laxmikant-Pyarelal	Anand Bakshi	Mohammed Aziz
Paappi Devataa	1045	"Uska Naam Hai Piya"	Laxmikant-Pyarelal	Anand Bakshi	solo
Paapi Farishte	1046	"Main Awara Badal"	Usha Khanna	Kumar Sanu	Yogesh, S. Bhaskar, Suraj Kumar Sharma
Paapi Farishte	1047	"Main Awara Badal" (part 2)	Usha Khanna	Kumar Sanu	Yogesh, S. Bhaskar, Suraj Kumar Sharma
Param Vir Chakra	1048	"Pyaar Ki Vadion Mein" (part 1)	Ravindra Jain	Ravindra Jain	Udit Narayan
Param Vir Chakra	1049	"Pyaar Ki Vadion Mein" (part 2)	Ravindra Jain	Ravindra Jain	Udit Narayan
Prem	1050	""Maine Jee Liya"	Laxmikant-Pyarelal	Anand Bakshi	Nalin Dave
Prem	1051	"Teraa Meraa Prem Hai Tab Se"	Laxmikant-Pyarelal	Anand Bakshi	Nalin Dave
Prem	1052	"Ho Meree Chudiya Bajee Chhan Chhan"	Laxmikant-Pyarelal	Anand Bakshi	Nalin Dave
Prem	1053	"Do Teri Akhiya Do Meri Akhiya"	Laxmikant-Pyarelal	Anand Bakshi	Nalin Dave
Prem	1054	"Prem Kar Liya"	Laxmikant-Pyarelal	Anand Bakshi	Nalin Dave
Prem	1055	"Ek Baat Hui Kal Rat Hui"	Laxmikant-Pyarelal	Anand Bakshi	Nalin Dave
Prem	1056	"Log Isiko Kahate Hain Ishk Mohabbat Pyaar"	Laxmikant-Pyarelal	Anand Bakshi	solo
Prem	1057	"Ye Dharti Ye Ambar Jab Se" (Female)	Laxmikant-Pyarelal	Anand Bakshi	solo
Prem	1058	"Hai Meri Ankhiyo Ne Sapna Dekha Re"	Laxmikant-Pyarelal	Anand Bakshi	solo
Prem	1059	"Hai Meri Ankhiyo Ne Sapna Dekha Re" (2)	Laxmikant-Pyarelal	Anand Bakshi	solo
Raghuveer	1060	"O Jaaneman Chehra Tera"	Dilip Sen-Sameer Sen	Sameer	Jolly Mukherjee
Raghuveer	1061	"Bindiya Bole Kya Bole"	Dilip Sen-Sameer Sen	Sameer	Sukhwinder Singh
Raja	1062	"Aakhiyan Milau Kabhi Aakhiyan Churao"	Nadeem-Shravan	Sameer	Udit Narayan
Raja	1063	"Nazre Mili Dil Dhadka"	Nadeem-Shravan	Sameer	Udit Narayan
Raja	1064	"Kisi Din Banoongi"	Nadeem-Shravan	Sameer	Udit Narayan
Raja	1065	"Phool Mangoo Naa Bahaar"	Nadeem-Shravan	Sameer	Udit Narayan
Raja	1066	"Ja Sajna Tujhko Bhula"	Nadeem-Shravan	Sameer	Udit Narayan
Raja	1067	"Aankh Teri Chhalke To"	Nadeem-Shravan	Sameer	Udit Narayan
Raja	1068	"Chot Lage Tujhko"	Nadeem-Shravan	Sameer	Udit Narayan
Raja	1069	"Tumne Agar Pyar Se Dekha"	Nadeem-Shravan	Sameer	solo
Ram Jaane	1070	"Ram Jaane"	Anu Malik	Anand Bakshi	Udit Narayan, Sonu Nigam
Ram Shastra	1071	"Tera Chehra Na Dekhun" (female)	Anu Malik	Indeevar	solo
Ram Shastra	1072	"Tera Chehra Na Dekhun" (duet)	Anu Malik	Indeevar	Vinod Rathod
Ram Shastra	1073	"Tujhe Maanga Tha"	Anu Malik	Rahat Indori	Vinod Rathod
Ram Shastra	1074	"Pyaar Pyaar Mujhe"	Anu Malik	Dev Kohli	solo
Ram Shastra	1075	"O Main Teri"	Anu Malik	Dev Kohli	Kumar Sanu
Reshma	1076	"Thanedaar Bana Le"	Dilip Sen-Sameer Sen	Mahender Dalvi	solo
Rock Dancer	1077	"Sa Re Ga Ma"	Bappi Lahiri	Indeevar	Vijay Benedict
Rock Dancer	1078	"Ek Room Ek Light" (version 1)	Bappi Lahiri	Maya Govind	Vijay Benedict
Rock Dancer	1079	"Ek Room Ek Light"	Bappi Lahiri	Maya Govind	Bappi Lahiri
Saajan Ke Liye	1080	"Saajan Ke Liye Bekaraar"	Bappi Lahiri	Anwar Sagar, Nawab Arzoo	solo
Saajan Ke Liye	1081	"Jaadu Bhare Do Matwale"	Bappi Lahiri	Anwar Sagar, Nawab Arzoo	solo
Sabse Bada Khiladi	1082	"Bholi Bhali Ladki"	Rajesh Roshan	Dev Kohli	Kumar Sanu
Sabse Bada Khiladi	1083	"Mukabla Mukabla"	Rajesh Roshan	Dev Kohli	Kumar Sanu
Sanam Harjai	1084	"Pyaar Hoga Nahin"	Usha Khanna	Sameer	Abhijeet
Sooraj Pe Dastak	1085	"Sooraj Pe Dastak"	Khayyam		solo
Sooraj Pe Dastak	1086	"Jaane Kya Unke Nigahon Ne"	Khayyam		solo
Surakshaa	1087	"Masoom Sanam"	Anu Malik	Faiz Anwar	Kumar Sanu
Surakshaa	1088	"Dil Mein Ho Pyaar"	Anu Malik	Faiz Anwar	Kumar Sanu
Taaqat	1089	"Kaisi Hai Dil Ki Lagi"	Anand–Milind	Sameer	Kumar Sanu
Taaqat	1090	"Mere Chehre Pe Likha"	Anand–Milind	Sameer	Udit Narayan
Taaqat	1091	"Mera Dil Tujh Pe Marta"	Anand–Milind	Sameer	Udit Narayan
Takkar	1092	"Aankhon Mein Base Ho Tum"	Anu Malik	Maya Govind	Abhijeet
Takkar	1093	"Dil Gaya Haanthon Se"	Anu Malik	Rani Malik	Kumar Sanu
Takkar	1094	"Palkein Ho Khuli Ya Bandh"	Anu Malik	Rani Malik	Kumar Sanu
Takkar	1095	"Teri Aankhon Ne Aisa Kamaal Ki"	Anu Malik	Nawab Arzoo	Kumar Sanu
Taqdeerwala	1096	"Mera Dil Deewana"	Anand–Milind	Sameer	Abhijeet
Taqdeerwala	1097	"Dil Chura Ke Na Ja"	Anand–Milind	Sameer	Abhijeet
Taqdeerwala	1098	"Ankhon Ka Kaajal"	Anand–Milind	Sameer	Udit Narayan
Taqdeerwala	1099	"Ae Chhori"	Anand–Milind	Sameer	Kumar Sanu
Teenmoti	1100	"Yaar Dil Se"	Dilip Sen-Sameer Sen	Nawab Arzoo	Kumar Sanu
Trimurti	1101	"Sadiyan Saal"	Laxmikant-Pyarelal	Anand Bakshi	Udit Narayan
Trimurti	1102	"Mujhe Pyar Karo"	Laxmikant-Pyarelal	Anand Bakshi	Vinod Rathod, Manhar Udhas
Trimurti	1103	"Mata Mata"	Laxmikant-Pyarelal	Anand Bakshi	Vinod Rathod
Vapsi Saajan Ki	1104	"Aaya Sapnon Mein Koi"	Anand–Milind	Azad Jallundhry	solo
Veer	1105	"Tere Hain Hum"	Dilip Sen-Sameer Sen	Rani Malik	Kumar Sanu
Velu Naayakan	1106	"Chaha Humne Tujhe"	Illaiyaraaja	Nawab Arzoo, P K Mishra, Deepak Santosh	Kumar Sanu
Zamaana Deewana	1107	"Neend Kise Chain Kahan"	Nadeem-Shravan	Sameer	Kumar Sanu
Zamaana Deewana	1108	"Forever N Ever"	Nadeem-Shravan	Sameer	Kumar Sanu
Zamaana Deewana	1109	"Forever N Ever" (sad)	Nadeem-Shravan	Sameer	Kumar Sanu
Zamaana Deewana	1110	"Soch Liya Maine"	Nadeem-Shravan	Sameer	Vinod Rathod
Zamaana Deewana	1111	"Zamaana Deewana"	Nadeem-Shravan	Sameer	Vinod Rathod
Zamaana Deewana	1112	"Zamaane Ko Ab Tak"	Nadeem-Shravan	Sameer	Abhijeet
Zulm Ka Jawab	1113	"Mujhpe Daya Karo"	Bappi Lahiri	Indeevar	solo

=== 1996 ===
Film	No	Song	Composer(s)	Writer(s)	Co-artist(s)
Aatank	1114	"Meri Patli Qamar"	Laxmikant-Pyarelal	Majrooh Sultanpuri, Dev Kohli, Rani Malik	Ila Arun
Agni Prem	1115	"Mujhe To Pyar Pyar"	Bappi Lahiri	Nawab Arzoo	solo
Agni Sakshi	1116	"Mere Kaleje Se"	Nadeem-Shravan	Sameer	Sonu Nigam
Aisi Bhi Kya Jaldi Hai	1117	"Khwabon Ki Malika"	Gaurishankar Sharma	Majrooh Sultanpuri	Sonu Nigam
Ajay	1118	"Chammak Challo"	Anand–Milind	Sameer	Kumar Sanu
Ajay	1119	"Chand Sa Chehra"	Anand–Milind	Sameer	Kumar Sanu
Ajay	1120	"Deewana Hua Main"	Anand–Milind	Sameer	Kumar Sanu
Ajay	1121	"Ruk Majnu"	Anand–Milind	Sameer	Kumar Sanu
Ajay	1122	"Chanchal Chooriyan"	Anand–Milind	Sameer	Kumar Sanu
Ajay	1123	"Paan Khaake Jaana"	Anand–Milind	Sameer	Jolly Mukherjee, Udit Narayan
Ajay	1124	"Banna Ghodi Pe"	Anand–Milind	Sameer	Kumar Sanu, Jolly Mukherjee, Sapna Awasthi"
Angaara	1125	"Aara Hile Chhapra Hile"	Dilip Sen-Sameer Sen	Maya Govind, Nawab Arzoo	Udit Narayan
Army	1126	"Main To Hoon Pagal Munda"	Anand–Milind	Sameer	Vinod Rathod
Army	1127	"Ho Gayi Taiyar"	Anand–Milind	Sameer	Vinod Rathod, Abhijeet Bhattacharya, Jolly Mukherjee
Army	1128	"Ek Beeti Hui Kahani"	Anand–Milind	Sameer	solo
Bal Brahmachari	1129	"Kabhi Na Kabhi Jaana"	Bappi Lahiri	Prakash Mishra	solo
Bambai Ka Babu	1130	"Chori Chori"	Anand–Milind	Sameer	Kumar Sanu
Bambai Ka Babu	1131	"Honge Kabhi Ab Na Juda"	Anand–Milind	Sameer	Kumar Sanu
Bambai Ka Babu	1132	"Hum To Nikal Pade"	Anand–Milind	Sameer	Kumar Sanu, Udit Narayan, Bela Sulakhe
Bandish	1133	"Maine Apna Dil"	Anand–Milind	Sameer	Kumar Sanu
Bandish	1134	"Bole Mera Kangana"	Anand–Milind	Sameer	Kumar Sanu
Bandish	1135	"Main Ho Gaya Athara Saal Ki"	Anand–Milind	Sameer	Ila Arun
Beqabu	1136	"Beqabu Ho Gaya"	Anu Malik	Nida Fazli	Udit Narayan
Beqabu	1137	"Tu Woh Tu Hai"	Anu Malik	Nida Fazli	Udit Narayan
Beqabu	1138	"Chun Liya Maine"	Anu Malik	Maya Govind	Udit Narayan
Beqabu	1139	"Dil Mera Chalte Chalte"	Anu Malik	Maya Govind	Udit Narayan
Beqabu	1140	"Yaarian Yaarian"	Anu Malik	Maya Govind	Udit Narayan
Bhishma	1141	"Kya Nahin Kiya"	Dilip Sen-Sameer Sen	Anand Bakshi	Udit Narayan
Chaahat	1142	"Chaahat Na Hoti"	Anu Malik	Nida Fazli	Vinod Rathod
Chaahat	1143	"Nahin Lagta"	Anu Malik	Nida Fazli	Udit Narayan
Chhaila	1144	"Mastana Mastana Yeh Dil"	Ilaiyaraaja	P.K. Mishra	Kumar Sanu
Chhota Sa Ghar	1145	"Chal Mundeya Mandir Mein"	Rajesh Roshan	Indeevar	solo
Chhote Sarkar	1146	"Mujhe Dil Ka Rog"	Anand–Milind	Sameer	Udit Narayan
Chhote Sarkar	1147	"Ek Chumma Tu Mujhko"	Anand–Milind	Sameer	Udit Narayan
Chhote Sarkar	1148	"Ladki Pata Le"	Anand–Milind	Sameer	Vinod Rathod
Chhote Sarkar	1149	"Ek Naya Aasman"	Anand–Milind	Sameer	Kumar Sanu
Chhote Sarkar	1150	"Socho Na Jara Yeh"	Anand–Milind	Sameer	solo
Daanveer	1151	"Kaise Main Sambhalun"	Anand–Milind	Sameer	Kumar Sanu
Daraar	1152	"Aisi Mili Nigahen"	Anu Malik	Rani Malik	Kumar Sanu
Daraar	1153	"Tera Chand Chehra"	Anu Malik	Shaheen Iqbal	Kumar Sanu
Daraar	1154	"Tuhe Meri Manzil"	Anu Malik	Rahat Indori	Kumar Sanu
Daraar	1155	"Ek Ladki Mera Naam"	Anu Malik	Rahat Indori	Udit Narayan
Daraar	1156	"Maine Kaha Chal"	Anu Malik	Hasrat Jaipuri	Udit Narayan
Daraar	1157	"Main Hi Main"	Anu Malik	Majrooh Sultanpuri	Shankar Mahadevan
Dastak	1158	"Pal Beet Gaya"	Rajesh Roshan	Javed Akhtar	Kumar Sanu
Dil Tera Deewana	1159	"Dil Pe Lahoo Se"	Aadesh Shrivastava	Shyam Raj	Kumar Sanu
Dil Tera Deewana	1160	"Ban Ke Mohabbat Tum"	Aadesh Shrivastava	Shyam Raj	Kumar Sanu
Dil Tera Deewana	1161	"Gusse Se Aur Khilte Ho"	Aadesh Shrivastava	Lubna Khan	Abhijeet Bhattacharya
Dil Tera Deewana	1162	"Din Dhal Gaya"	Aadesh Shrivastava	Shyam Raj	Udit Narayan
Diljale	1163	"Kuchh Tum Behko"	Anu Malik	Sameer	Udit Narayan
Diljale	1164	"Ek Baat Main Apne Dil"	Anu Malik	Sameer	Kumar Sanu
Dushman Duniya Ka	1165	"Mere Samne Gudian Japani Hain"	Anu Malik	Ravindra Jain	Kumar Sanu
Dushman Duniya Ka	1166	"Tanha Dil Sulagtha Tha"	Anu Malik	Ravindra Jain	Kumar Sanu
English Babu Desi Mem	1167	"Deewana Main Tera Deewana"	Nikhil-Vinay	Sameer	Kumar Sanu
English Babu Desi Mem	1168	"Dhol Baje Khuddam"	Nikhil-Vinay	Sameer	Vinod Rathod
English Babu Desi Mem	1169	"O Bijuria Sun"	Nikhil-Vinay	Sameer	Udit Narayan, Jolly Mukherjee
Fareb	1170	"Aankhon Se Dil Mein Utar Ke"	Jatin-Lalit	Neeraj	Kumar Sanu
Fareb	1171	"Pyar Ka Pehla Pehla"	Jatin-Lalit	Neeraj	Kumar Sanu
Fareb	1172	"O Humsafar" (duet)	Jatin-Lalit	Neeraj	Udit Narayan
Fareb	1173	"O Humsafar"	Jatin-Lalit	Neeraj	solo
Ghatak: Lethal	1174	"Koi Jaye To Le Aaye"	Anu Malik	Rahat Indori	Shankar Mahadevan
Hahakaar	1175	"Gore Gore Gaal"	Bappi Lahiri	Nawab Arzoo, Ahmed Wasi, Deepak Sneh	Kumar Sanu
Hahakaar	1176	"Tota Tota"	Bappi Lahiri	Nawab Arzoo, Ahmed Wasi, Deepak Sneh	Sudesh Bhosle
Himmat	1177	"Mujhe Tujhse Kuchh"	Anand–Milind	Sameer	Kumar Sanu
Himmat	1178	"Saathiya Bin Tere"	Anand–Milind	Sameer	Kumar Sanu
Himmat	1179	"Kuru Kuru"	Anand–Milind	Sameer	Kumar Sanu
Himmat	1180	"Mathe Ki Bindiya"	Anand–Milind	Sameer	Udit Narayan
Himmatvar	1181	"Aapke Saamne"	Nadeem-Shravan	Sameer	Kumar Sanu
Himmatvar	1182	"Aag Chahay Ki"	Nadeem-Shravan	Sameer	Babul Supriyo
Himmatvar	1183	"Pyaar Ka Meetha Meetha"	Nadeem-Shravan	Sameer	Udit Narayan
Himmatvar	1184	"Kya Mila Hai Sila"	Nadeem-Shravan	Sameer	solo
Hum Hain Khalnayak	1185	"Mausam Hai Haseen"	Bappi Lahiri	Rani Malik	Bappi Lahiri
Hum Hain Khalnayak	1186	"Choli Purani" (version 1)	Bappi Lahiri	Maya Govind	Sapan Chakraborty, Ila Arun
Hum Hain Khalnayak	1187	"Choli Purani" (version 2)	Bappi Lahiri	Maya Govind	Ila Arun
Hum Hain Premi	1188	"Chehra Kahe Dil Ki Baatein"	Shyam-Surender	Rani Malik	Kumar Sanu
Hum Hain Premi	1189	"Tere Pyaar Mein Pagal"	Shyam-Surender	Sateesh	Kumar Sanu
Hum Hain Premi	1190	"Tere Pyaar Mein Mera Naam"	Shyam-Surender	Sateesh	Kumar Sanu
Hum Hain Premi	1191	"Yeh Vaada Kiya Humne"	Shyam-Surender	Sateesh	Kumar Sanu
Hum Hain Premi	1192	"Sarkaile Khatiya"	Shyam-Surender	Sateesh	Kumar Sanu, Ila Arun
Hum Hain Premi	1193	"Mashooqa Main"	Shyam-Surender	Indeevar	solo
Jaan	1194	"Rab Se Sajan Se"	Anand–Milind	Anand Bakshi	Udit Narayan
Jaan	1195	"Kunwara Nahin Marna"	Anand–Milind	Anand Bakshi	Udit Narayan
Jaan	1196	"Beimaan Piya Re"	Anand–Milind	Anand Bakshi	Udit Narayan
Jaan	1197	"Jaan Gayee Dil Aaya"	Anand–Milind	Anand Bakshi	Udit Narayan
Jaan	1198	"Jaan O Meri Jaan"	Anand–Milind	Anand Bakshi	Manhar Udhas
Jaan	1199	"Aai Bo Who Kaata"	Anand–Milind	Anand Bakshi	Sapna Mukherjee
Jeet	1200	"Yaara O Yaara Milna"	Nadeem-Shravan	Sameer	Vinod Rathod
Jeet	1201	"Saason Ka Chalna"	Nadeem-Shravan	Sameer	Udit Narayan
Jeet	1202	"Sajan Ghar Aana"	Nadeem-Shravan	Sameer	Udit Narayan
Jeet	1203	"Tu Dharti Pe Jitna Bhi"	Nadeem-Shravan	Sameer	Kumar Sanu
Jeet	1204	"Abhi Saans Lene Ki Fursat Nahin"	Nadeem-Shravan	Sameer	Sonu Nigam
Khamoshi: The Musical	1205	"Bahon Ke Darmiyan"	Jatin Lalit	Majrooh Sultanpuri	Hariharan
Khel Khiladi Ka	1206	"Dil Se Dil Zara"	A.R. Rahman	Mehboob	Udit Narayan
Khiladi Ka Khiladi	1207	"Aaj Meri Zindagi"	Anu Malik		Babul Supriyo
Khilona	1208	"Hum Jaante Hai"	Naresh Sharma	Zafar Gorakhpuri	Vinod Rathod
Khilona	1209	"Lag Jao Gale"	Naresh Sharma	Deepak Choudhury	Kumar Sanu
Kisi Se Dil Lagake Dekho	1210	"Li Li Li Sharmili"	Rajesh Roshan	Sameer	Kumar Sanu
Kisi Se Dil Lagake Dekho	1211	"Kisi Se Dil Lagake Dekho"	Rajesh Roshan	Sameer	Kumar Sanu
Krishna	1212	"Main Is Qadar"	Anu Malik	Madan Pal	Vinod Rathod
Krishna	1213	"Jhanjhariya" (female)	Anu Malik	Anand Raj Anand	solo
Loafer	1214	"Meri Tirchi Nazar Mein Hai Jadoo"	Anand–Milind	Nitin Raikwar	solo
Loafer	1215	"Pandit Ji"	Anand–Milind	Udit Narayan	Sameer
Loafer	1216	"Jiske Liye Pal Bhar"	Anand–Milind	Udit Narayan	Sameer
Maahir	1217	"Tukdaa Main Tera Dil Ka Maa"	Bappi Lahiri	Prayag Raj	solo
Maahir	1218	"Vaada Karke Jaate Ho Tum"	Bappi Lahiri	Sakandar Bharti	Kumar Sanu
Mafia	1219	"Yeh Dil Yeh Pagal Dil"	Anand–Milind	Sameer	Kumar Sanu
Mafia	1220	"Duniya Nazare Na Gulon Ka"	Anand–Milind	Sameer	Kumar Sanu
Mafia	1221	"Is Ladki Ne"	Anand–Milind	Sameer	Kumar Sanu
Majhdhaar	1222	"Sagar Se Gehra Hai"	Nadeem-Shravan	Sameer	S. P. Balasubrahmanyam
Majhdhaar	1223	"Main Isse Mohabbat"	Nadeem-Shravan	Sameer	Udit Narayan, Mohammed Aziz
Majhdhaar	1224	"Humne Khamoshi Se"	Nadeem-Shravan	Sameer	solo
Mr. Bechara	1225	"Janam Meri Janam"	Anand–Milind	Nawab Arzoo	Udit Narayan
Mr. Bechara	1226	"Saathi Mere"	Anand–Milind	Sameer	Kumar Sanu
Muqadama	1227	"Saajan Tu Mero Baat"	Bappi Lahiri	Kasif	solo
Muqadar	1228	"Dil Hai Tera"	Anand–Milind	Sameer	Kumar Sanu
Muqadar	1229	"Atom Bomb"	Anand–Milind	Sameer	Abhijeet Bhattacharya
Naam Kya Hai	1230	"Naam Kya Hai"	Anand–Milind	Majrooh Sultanpuri	Udit Narayan
Naam Kya Hai	1231	"Chikilaki Chikilaki Chumbi"	Anand–Milind	Majrooh Sultanpuri	Kumar Sanu
Nazar	1232	"Yeh Chand Kahin"	Dilip Sen-Sameer Sen	Maya Govind, Nawab Arzoo, A K Shrivastava	Kumar Sanu
Papa Kehte Hai	1233	"Pyar Mein Hota Hai Kya Jaadu"	Rajesh Roshan	Javed Akhtar	Kumar Sanu
Papi Gudia	1234	"Music-I Love The Beat"	Naresh Sharma	Sameer	solo
Papi Gudia	1235	"Gudda Le Aaon Na"	Naresh Sharma	Sameer	solo
Papi Gudia	1236	"Mujhe Tujh Se Kitna Pyar"	Naresh Sharma	Sameer	Kumar Sanu
Papi Gudia	1237	"Aaj Sajke Niklee Hai"	Naresh Sharma	Gulshan Sarna	Udit Narayan
Prem Granth	1238	"Jungle Mein Sher"	Laxmikant-Pyarelal	Anand Bakshi	Vinod Rathod
Prem Granth	1239	"Is Duniya Mein Prem Granth"	Laxmikant-Pyarelal	Anand Bakshi	Vinod Rathod
Prem Granth	1240	"Dil Dene Ki Rut"	Laxmikant-Pyarelal	Anand Bakshi	Vinod Rathod
Prem Granth	1241	"Bajoo Bandh"	Laxmikant-Pyarelal	Anand Bakshi	Suresh Wadkar
Raja Hindustani	1242	"Pardesi Pardesi" (version 1)	Nadeem-Shravan	Sameer	Udit Narayan, Sapna Awasthi
Raja Hindustani	1243	Pardesi Pardesi" (version 2)	Nadeem-Shravan	Sameer	Kumar Sanu
Raja Hindustani	1244	"Poochho Zara Poochho"	Nadeem-Shravan	Sameer	Kumar Sanu
Raja Hindustani	1245	"Kitna Pyara Tujhe Rab Ne Banaya"	Nadeem-Shravan	Sameer	Udit Narayan
Raja Hindustani	1246	"Aaye Ho Meri Zindagi Mein"	Nadeem-Shravan	Sameer	solo
Rajkumar	1247	"Payal Meri"	Laxmikant-Pyarelal	Anand Bakshi	Udit Narayan
Rajkumar	1248	"Bechain Hoon Main"	Laxmikant-Pyarelal	Anand Bakshi	Udit Narayan
Rajkumar	1249	"Tu Bijli Hai"	Laxmikant-Pyarelal	Anand Bakshi	Udit Narayan
Rajkumar	1250	"Yeh Khubsoorat Badan"	Laxmikant-Pyarelal	Anand Bakshi	solo
Rajkumar	1251	"O Mere Rajkumar"	Laxmikant-Pyarelal	Anand Bakshi	solo
Rakshak	1252	"Kuchi Kuchi"	Anand–Milind	Sameer	Kumar Sanu
Ram Aur Shyam	1253	"Ajab Ho Tum"	Anu Malik	Faiz Anwar	Kumar Sanu
Ram Aur Shyam	1254	"Ek Nazar Dekha Tujhe"	Anu Malik	Faiz Anwar	Kumar Sanu
Return of Jewel Thief	1255	"Aa Meri Janam"	Jatin-Lalit	Anand Bakshi	Abhijeet
Return of Jewel Thief	1256	"Jug Magati Hai"	Jatin-Lalit	Anand Bakshi	Kumar Sanu, Mohammed Aziz, Bali Brahmbhatt & Vijeta Pandit
Return of Jewel Thief	1257	"Aaja Re Aaja Sajna"	Jatin-Lalit	Anand Bakshi	solo
Saajan Chale Sasural	1258	"Chahat Se Begani"	Nadeem-Shravan	Sameer	Kumar Sanu
Saajan Chale Sasural	1259	"Bye Bye Miss Goodnight"	Nadeem-Shravan	Sameer	Kumar Sanu
Saajan Chale Sasural	1260	"Tum To Dhokebaaz Ho"	Nadeem-Shravan	Sameer	Kumar Sanu
Saajan Chale Sasural	1261	"Dil Jaane Jigar Tujhpe"	Nadeem-Shravan	Sameer	Kumar Sanu
Sautela Bhai	1262	"Na Na Na, Main Nahin Aati"	R. D. Burman	Majrooh Sultanpuri	solo
Shikaar	1263	"Parde Mein Kaunsa Jalwa"	Anand–Milind	Majrooh Sultanpuri	Udit Narayan
Shikaar	1264	"Yun To Ankhon Mein Tum"	Anand–Milind	Majrooh Sultanpuri	Udit Narayan
Shikaar	1265	"Pyar Hai Yaar Hai"	Anand–Milind	Majrooh Sultanpuri	Udit Narayan
Smuggler	1266	"Kitna Haseen Hai Shabab"	Bappi Lahiri	Nawab Arzoo	Sudesh Bhosle
Smuggler	1267	"Aaj Raat Chod Ke"	Bappi Lahiri	Nawab Arzoo	solo
Smuggler	1268	Kitna Haseen Hai Shabaab (Solo)	Bappi Lahiri	Nawab Arzoo	solo
Smuggler	1269	"Yeh Baarish Ki Pani"	Bappi Lahiri	Maya Govind	Kumar Sanu
Smuggler	1270	"Bin Barsaat Ke"	Bappi Lahiri	Maya Govind	Ila Arun
Talaashi	1271	"Pyaar Karegi Na Re Baba" (version 1)	Anand–Milind	Sameer	Amit Kumar
Talaashi	1272	"Pyaar Karegi Na Re Baba" (version 2)	Anand–Milind	Sameer	Amit Kumar
Talaashi	1273	"Pyaar Karegi Na Re Baba" (sad)	Anand–Milind	Sameer	Amit Kumar
Tere Mere Sapne	1274	"Mera Dil Gaya"	Viju Shah	Anand Bakshi	Udit Narayan
Tu Chor Main Sipahi	1275	"Kuch Ho Gaya"	Dilip Sen-Sameer Sen	Anand Bakshi	Kumar Sanu
Tu Chor Main Sipahi	1276	"Tak Dhina Tak Dhina"	Dilip Sen-Sameer Sen	Anand Bakshi	Kumar Sanu
Tu Chor Main Sipahi	1277	"Bolo O Gori"	Dilip Sen-Sameer Sen	Anand Bakshi	Kumar Sanu
Tu Chor Main Sipahi	1278	"Hum Do Premee"	Dilip Sen-Sameer Sen	Anand Bakshi	Kumar Sanu
Uff! Yeh Mohabbat	1279	"Jabse Hai Seekha"	Nikhil-Vinay	Rani Malik	Kumar Sanu
Vijeta	1280	"Ghunghat Mein Mukhde Ko"	Anand–Milind	Sameer	Udit Narayan
Vijeta	1281	"Khwabon Mein Aanewale"	Anand–Milind	Sameer	Vinod Rathod

=== 1997 ===
Film	No	Song	Composer(s)	Writer(s)	Co-artist(s)
Agnichakra	1282	"Arzi Dil Ji Meri"	Bappi Lahiri	Amit Khanna	Bappi Lahiri
Agnichakra	1283	"Dil Dene Se Pehle"	Bappi Lahiri	Amit Khanna	Kumar Sanu
Anjaane	1284	"Kurta Malmal Ka"	Rajesh Roshan	Indeevar	Udit Narayan
Anjaane	1285	"Nain Tere Jhuke"	Rajesh Roshan	Indeevar	Kumar Sanu
Ankhon Mein Tum Ho	1286	"Har Ek Muskurahat"	Anu Malik		solo
Ankhon Mein Tum Ho	1287	"Ankhon Mein Tum Ho"	Anu Malik		Kumar Sanu
Aur Pyaar Ho Gaya	1288	"Meri Sanson Mein"	Nusrat Fateh Ali Khan	Javed Akhtar	solo
Aur Pyaar Ho Gaya	1289	"Uttar Dakshin"	Nusrat Fateh Ali Khan	Javed Akhtar	Sonu Nigam
Auzaar	1290	"Hum Aur Tum Aur Yeh Samaa"	Anu Malik	Rahat Indori	Anu Malik, Remo Fernandes
Auzaar	1291	"Thehra Hai Yeh Samaa"	Anu Malik	Rahat Indori	Kumar Sanu
Auzaar	1292	"Dil Ke Sau Tukre"	Anu Malik		Kumar Sanu
Bhai	1293	"Husna Tumhara"	Anand–Milind		Udit Narayan
Bhai Bhai	1294	"Ankhen Jiski Mandir Masjid"	Aadesh Shrivastava	Nida Fazli	Kumar Sanu, Udit Narayan, Sapna Mukherjee
Bhai Bhai	1295	"Chand Nikla"	Aadesh Shrivastava	Indeevar	Kumar Sanu, Sudesh Bhosle
Bhai Bhai	1296	"Dil Dil Dil"	Aadesh Shrivastava	Indeevar	Kumar Sanu
Bhai Bhai	1297	"Yeh Mausam"	Aadesh Shrivastava	Dev Kohli	Sudesh Bhosle
Border	1298	"Hamen Jabse Mohabbat"	Anu Malik	Javed Akhtar	Sonu Nigam
Chirag	1299	"O Mehbooba Dekho"	Rajesh Roshan	Anand Bakshi	Kumar Sanu
Deewana Mastana	1300	"Dil Chahe Kisi Se"	Laxmikant-Pyarelal		solo
Deewana Mastana	1301	"Tere Bina Dil"	Laxmikant-Pyarelal		Udit Narayan, Vinod Rathod
Deewana Mastana	1302	"Yeh Gaya Woh Gaya"	Laxmikant-Pyarelal		Vinod Rathod
Dhaal	1303	"Dhire Dhire Balam"	Anu Malik	Qateel Shifai	Kumar Sanu
Dhaal	1304	"Haasil Mazaa Hai"	Anu Malik	Qateel Shifai	Kumar Sanu
Dharma Karma	1305	"Teru Naukari Ne"	Bappi Lahiri	Nawab Arzoo	Kumar Sanu
Dil Ke Jharoke Main	1306	"Aao Re"	Bappi Lahiri	Majrooh Sultanpuri	Udit Narayan, Vinod Rathod
Dil Ke Jharoke Main	1307	"Utte Rassi Tangaya"	Bappi Lahiri	Majrooh Sultanpuri	solo
Dil Ke Jharoke Main	1308	"Dil Ke Jharoke Main"	Bappi Lahiri	Majrooh Sultanpuri	Kumar Sanu
Dil Kitna Nadaan Hai	1309	"Mohabbat Kaaza Paaya"	Anu Malik	Rahat Indori	Kumar Sanu
Dil Kitna Nadaan Hai	1310	"Mohabbat Naam Hai Kiska"	Anu Malik	Rahat Indori	Kumar Sanu
Dil Kitna Nadaan Hai	1311	"Aayegi Barsaat"	Anu Malik	Rahat Indori	Kumar Sanu
Dil Kitna Nadaan Hai	1312	"Nazar Ki Baat Hai"	Anu Malik	Faiz Anwar	Kumar Sanu
Dil Kitna Nadaan Hai	1313	"Dil Kitna Nadan Hai" (female)	Anu Malik	Faiz Anwar	solo
Do Ankhen Barah Hath	1314	"Ae Mausam Suhane"	Bappi Lahiri	Indeevar	Abhijeet
Do Ankhen Barah Hath	1315	"Karte Hain Hum Pyaar"	Bappi Lahiri	Indeevar	Kirti Kumar
Do Ankhen Barah Hath	1316	"Kasam Se"	Bappi Lahiri	Indeevar	Kumar Sanu
Do Ankhen Barah Hath	1317	"Mile Jo Tere Naina"	Bappi Lahiri	Indeevar	Kumar Sanu
Ek Phool Teen Kante	1318	"Jaanam O Jaanam"	Jatin-Lalit	Sameer	Kumar Sanu
Ek Phool Teen Kante	1319	"Yeh Kaisa Nasha"	Jatin-Lalit	Sameer	Kumar Sanu
Ek Phool Teen Kante	1320	"Yeh Ladki Badi"	Jatin-Lalit	Nawab Arzoo	Abhijeet
Ghulam-E-Musthafa	1321	"Dum Dum Danke Pe"	Rajesh Roshan	Anand Bakshi	Udit Narayan
Gundagardi	1322	"Ek Di Teen"	Jatin-Lalit	Shyam Anuragi	Jolly Mukherjee
Gundagardi	1323	"Bahar Baras"	Jatin-Lalit	Maya Govind	Kumar Sanu
Gupt: The Hidden Truth	1324	"Mere Khwabon Mein Tu"	Viju Shah	Anand Bakshi	Kumar Sanu
Gupt: The Hidden Truth	1325	"Mushkil Bada Yeh Pyaar Hain"	Viju Shah	Anand Bakshi	Udit Narayan
Gupt: The Hidden Truth	1326	"Yeh Pyaasi Mohabbat Yeh Pyasi Jawani"	Viju Shah	Anand Bakshi	solo
Gupt: The Hidden Truth	1327	"Yeh Pyaar Kya Hai"	Viju Shah	Anand Bakshi	Kumar Sanu, Kavita Krishnamurthy
Hameshaa	1328	"Aisa Milan Kal Ho Na Ho"	Anu Malik	Dev Kohli	Kumar Sanu
Hameshaa	1329	"Dil Tujhpe Fida"	Anu Malik	Dev Kohli	Kumar Sanu
Hameshaa	1330	"Rangtadi Rangtadi"	Anu Malik	Maya Govind	Ila Arun
Hero No. 1	1331	"Tere Baap Ke Darr Se"	Anand–Milind	Sameer	Kumar Sanu
Himalay Putra	1332	"Ishq Hua Hai Tujhse Sanam"	Anu Malik	Qateel Shifai	Udit Narayan
Himalay Putra	1333	"Tune Kaisa Jafu Kiya"	Anu Malik	Qateel Shifai	Udit Narayan
Himalay Putra	1334	"Na Woh Inkaar Karti Hai"	Anu Malik	Qateel Shifai	Udit Narayan
Himalay Putra	1335	"Kaga Sab Tan Khaiyo"	Anu Malik	Qateel Shifai	Sonu Nigam
Himalay Putra	1336	"Kithe Nain Na Jodi"	Anu Malik	Qateel Shifai	Sonu Nigam
Insaaf	1337	"Hum Bhi Tanha Sanam "	Anand–Milind		solo
Ishq	1338	"Neend Churayi Meri"	Anu Malik	Rahat Indori	Udit Narayan, Kumar Sanu, Kavita Krishnamurthy
Ishq	1339	"Dekho Dekho Janam"	Anu Malik	Rahat Indori	Udit Narayan
Ishq	1340	"Tu Jhootha"	Anu Malik	Javed Akhtar	Udit Narayan, Abhijeet, Sadhna Sargam
Itihaas	1341	"Chori Chori Dil Diya"	Dilip Sen-Sameer Sen	Sameer	Kumar Sanu
Itihaas	1342	"Dil Ke Qalam Se" (film version)	Dilip Sen-Sameer Sen	Sameer	Hariharan
Itihaas	1343	"Achko Machko"	Dilip Sen-Sameer Sen	Sameer	solo
Itihaas	1344	"Bol Bol Bol Raja"	Dilip Sen-Sameer Sen	Sameer	Vinod Rathod, Shankar Mahadevan
Itihaas	1345	"Ja Re Ja Ud Ja Panchhi"	Dilip Sen-Sameer Sen	Sameer	Shankar Mahadevan
Itihaas	1346	"Pyar Ka Dushman"	Dilip Sen-Sameer Sen	Sameer	Shankar Mahadevan
Itihaas	1347	"Juda Apne Dilbar Se"	Dilip Sen-Sameer Sen	Sameer	Shankar Mahadevan, Sukhwinder Singh
Itihaas	1348	"Ishq Bada Bedardi Hai"	Dilip Sen-Sameer Sen	Sameer	K. Pappu
Jeevan Yudh	1349	"Sun Sajna Tere Bin"	Nadeem-Shravan	Sameer	Babul Supriyo
Jeevan Yudh	1350	"Zindagi Guzarne Ke Liye"	Nadeem-Shravan	Sameer	Pankaj Udhas
Jodidar	1351	"Tujhse Milan Ka"	Bappi Lahiri		Bappi Lahiri
Judaai	1352	"Mujhe Pyaar Hua Allahmiya"	Nadeem-Shravan	Sameer	Abhijeet
Judaai	1353	"Main Tujhse Aise Milun"	Nadeem-Shravan	Sameer	Abhijeet
Judaai	1354	"Judaai Judaai" (version 1)	Nadeem-Shravan	Sameer	Hariharan & Jaspinder Narula
Judaai	1355	"Judaai Judaai" (version 2)	Nadeem-Shravan	Sameer	Hariharan & Jaspinder Narula
Judaai	1356	"Ooee baba (Pyaar Pyaar Karte Karte)"	Nadeem-Shravan	Sameer	Abhijeet & Sapna Mukherjee
Judaai	1357	"Shaadi Karke Pas Gaya"	Nadeem-Shravan	Sameer	Bali Bramhabhatt, Babul Supriyo & Shankar Mahadevan
Judge Mujrim	1358	"Dil Todke Na Jaa"	Bappi Lahiri	Anwar Sagar	solo
Kaalia	1359	"Bedardi Ke Sang"	Anand Raj Anand	Anand Raj Anand	Udit Narayan
Kaun Rokega Mujhe	1360	"Suit Meri Americawala"	Laxmikant-Pyarelal		Sudesh Bhosle
Kaun Sachcha Kaun Jhootha	1361	"Chanchal Hawaon Se"	Rajesh Roshan	Sameer	solo
Kaun Sachcha Kaun Jhootha	1362	"Dil Se Judi Dil"	Rajesh Roshan	Sameer	Kumar Sanu
Khiladi No. 1	1363	"Chhanak Chhanak Meri Payal"	Ilaiyaraaja	Sanjeev Kohli	Udit Narayan
Koyla	1364	"Bhang Ke Nashe Mein"	Rajesh Roshan		Aditya Narayan
Koyla	1365	"Dekha Tujhe To Ho Gayee Deewani"	Rajesh Roshan		Kumar Sanu
Koyla	1366	"Tanhai Tanhai"	Rajesh Roshan		Udit Narayan
Krishna Arjun	1367	"Andekha Anjaana"	Arup-Pranay		Kumar Sanu
Krishna Arjun	1368	"Jugan Mein"	Arup-Pranay		Ila Arun, Khalid
Lahoo Ke Do Rang	1369	"Haseeno Ko Aate Hain"	Anand–Milind		Udit Narayan
Lahoo Ke Do Rang	1370	"Dil Tumhara Aashiq"	Anand–Milind		Abhijeet
Lahoo Ke Do Rang	1371	"Mujhe Paisa Mila"	Anand–Milind		Kumar Sanu
Lahoo Ke Do Rang	1372	"Aawara Paagal Deewana"	Anand–Milind		Kumar Sanu
Lav Kush	1373	"Saari Ayodhya Naachti"	Raam Laxman	Dev Kohli	Kavita Krishnamurthy
Lav Kush	1374	"Tak Dhina Dhin"	Raam Laxman	Dev Kohli	Kumar Sanu
Mahaanta	1375	"Chule Chule"	Laxmikant-Pyarelal	Anand Bakshi	solo
Mahaanta	1376	"Deva O Deva"	Laxmikant-Pyarelal	Anand Bakshi	solo
Mahaanta	1377	"Ek Taraf Akeli Mohabbat Hai"	Laxmikant-Pyarelal	Anand Bakshi	Mohammed Aziz
Mahaanta	1378	"Lo Ji Suno Ji"	Laxmikant-Pyarelal	Anand Bakshi	Mohammed Aziz
Mahaanta	1379	"Haan Main Tujhse Pyaar Karti Hoon"	Laxmikant-Pyarelal	Anand Bakshi	Vinod Rathod
Mere Sapno Ki Rani	1380	"Aaja Meri Bahon Mein"	Anand–Milind	Nitin Kumar	Udit Narayan
Mere Sapno Ki Rani	1381	"Payal Kare Chham Chham"	Anand–Milind	Nitin Kumar	Udit Narayan
Mere Sapno Ki Rani	1382	"Phir Se Dhol Bajega"	Anand–Milind	Nitin Kumar	Udit Narayan, Vinod Rathod
Mere Sapno Ki Rani	1383	"Bagiya Ke Amrud"	Anand–Milind	Dev Kohli	solo
Mere Sapno Ki Rani	1384	"Chupke Chupke Sabse"	Anand–Milind	Dev Kohli	Sadhana Sargam
Mere Sapno Ki Rani	1385	"Swapna Sunderi"	Anand–Milind	Dev Kohli	Udit Narayan
Mere Sapno Ki Rani	1386	"Ye Pyar Ye Pyar"	Anand–Milind	Dev Kohli	Udit Narayan
Mohabbat Kia Hau	1387	"Khuda Jaanta Hai"	Rajan Bawa	Rajan Bawa	Rafiq Ahmed
Mrityudand	1388	"Kehdo Ek Baar"	Anand–Milind		Udit Narayan
Mrityudata	1389	"Kabhi Khusiyon Ki Sargam"	Anand–Milind	Sameer	Mohammed Aziz, Vinod Rathod
Nirnayak	1390	"Chiki Chiki Bang Bang"	Bappi Lahiri	Maya Govind, Indeevar, Anwar Sagar, Nawab Arzoo	solo
Nirnayak	1391	"Teri Hansi Ne"	Bappi Lahiri	Maya Govind, Indeevar, Anwar Sagar, Nawab Arzoo	Kumar Sanu
Nirnayak	1392	"Dil Mera Ghar Hai"	Bappi Lahiri	Indeevar	Kumar Sanu
Pardes	1393	"Meri Mehbooba"	Nadeem-Shravan	Sameer	Kumar Sanu
Pardes	1394	"Nahin Hona Tha"	Nadeem-Shravan	Sameer	Udit Narayan, Hema Sardesai, Sabri Brothers
Prithvi	1395	"Een Meen Sade Teen"	Viju Shah	Nitin Raikwar	Udit Narayan
Qahar	1396	"Maine Dil Se Poochha"	Anand–Milind		Udit Narayan
Qahar	1397	"Rab Ke Saamne"	Anand–Milind		Udit Narayan
Qahar	1398	"Mujhe Bichchoo Lad Gaya Re"	Anand–Milind		solo
Sajna Doli Leke Aana	1399	"Tere Pyaar Ka Hua Hoon"	M. M. Keeravani	P. K. Mishra	Kumar Sanu
Salma Pe Dil Aagaya	1400	"Bekali Bekhudi Bebasi De Gaya"	Aadesh Shrivastava	Ravindra Jain	Kumar Sanu
Sanam	1401	"Ankhon Mein Neendein"	Anand–Milind	Sameer	Kumar Sanu
Sanam	1402	"Ishq Me Mere Rabba"	Anand–Milind	Sameer	Kumar Sanu
Shapath	1403	"Hai Bada Anari"	Anand–Milind	Sameer	Udit Narayan
Shapath	1404	"Munde Bigad Gaye"	Anand–Milind	Sameer	Udit Narayan, Vinod Rathod
Shapath	1405	"Munde Aur Kudiyan"	Anand–Milind	Sameer	Udit Narayan, Vinod Rathod
Suraj	1406	"Aage Pyar Peechhe Pyar"	Anand–Milind	Sameer	Udit Narayan
Suraj	1407	"Kya Hua Kya Pata"	Anand–Milind	Sameer	Vinod Rathod
Tamanna	1408	"Yeh Kya Hua"	Anu Malik	Rahat Indori	Kumar Sanu
Tamanna	1409	"Aaj Kal Meri"	Anu Malik	Rahat Indori	solo
Tamanna	1410	"Shab Ke Jaage Huye"	Anu Malik	Makhdoom Mohiuddin	solo
Tarazu	1411	"Haseena Gori Gori"	Rajesh Roshan		Udit Narayan
Tarazu	1412	"Ai Deewane Dil"	Rajesh Roshan		Kumar Sanu
Udaan	1413	"Jab Jab Dekhun Tujhe"	Anand–Milind	Sameer	Kumar Sanu
Udaan	1414	"Kal Raat Sapne Mein"	Anand–Milind	Sameer	Kumar Sanu
Udaan	1415	"Badal Garja"	Anand–Milind	Sameer	Kumar Sanu
Yes Boss	1416	"Main Koi Aisa Geet Gaoon"	Jatin-Lalit	Javed Akhtar	Abhijeet
Yes Boss	1417	"Choodi Baji Hai Kahin"	Jatin-Lalit	Javed Akhtar	Udit Narayan
Yes Boss	1418	"Ek Din Aap"	Jatin-Lalit	Javed Akhtar	Kumar Sanu
Zameer: The Awakening of a Soul	1419	"Tune Pyaar Ka Jadu"	Anand–Milind	Sameer	Kumar Sanu
Zameer: The Awakening of a Soul	1420	"Tere Nagme"	Anand–Milind	Sameer	Kumar Sanu
Zameer: The Awakening of a Soul	1421	"Laila Laila"	Anand–Milind	Sameer	Kumar Sanu
Zameer: The Awakening of a Soul	1422	"Tak Taka Tak"	Anand–Milind	Sameer	Udit Narayan
Zameer: The Awakening of a Soul	1423	"Abhi Abhi Aayi Jawani"	Anand–Milind	Sameer	solo
Ziddi	1424	"Hum Mile Tum Mile"	Dilip Sen-Sameer Sen		Udit Narayan

=== 1998 ===
Film	No	Song	Composer(s)	Writer(s)	Co-artist(s)
2001: Do Hazaar Ek	1425	"Neend Churaye"	Anand Raj Anand	Anand Raj Anand	solo
Achanak	1426	"Oonchi Oonchi Deewaron Mein"	Dilip Sen-Sameer Sen	Sameer	Hariharan
Achanak	1427	"Na Koi Awaz De Humko"	Dilip Sen-Sameer Sen	Sameer	Hariharan
Achanak	1428	"Jaane Jaana"	Dilip Sen-Sameer Sen	Sameer	Abhijeet
Achanak	1429	Duniya Bhula Ke"	Dilip Sen-Sameer Sen	Sameer	Kumar Sanu
Aangaaray	1430	"Tanha Tanha"	Aadesh Shrivastava	Javed Akhtar	Abhijeet
Aangaaray	1431	"Hai Koi Meharban"	Aadesh Shrivastava	Javed Akhtar	Abhijeet
Aangaaray	1432	"Aande Aande"	Aadesh Shrivastava	Javed Akhtar	Aadesh Shrivastava, Udit Narayan, Amit Kumar
Aangaaray	1433	"Yaaden Kitni Yaaden" (duet)	Anu Malik	Javed Akhtar	Udit Narayan
Aangaaray	1434	"Yaaden Kitni Yaaden" (female)	Anu Malik	Javed Akhtar	solo
Aunty No. 1	1435	"Kuchh Kuchh"	Anand–Milind	Sameer	Udit Narayan
Aunty No. 1	1436	"Bulbula Re Bulbula"	Anand–Milind	Sameer	Udit Narayan
Aunty No. 1	1437	"Sonpapdi"	Anand–Milind	Sameer	Vinod Rathod
Bada Din	1438	"Suno Zara"	Jatin-Lalit	Javed Akhtar	Kumar Sanu
Bada Din	1439	"Meri Aankhon Mein"	Jatin-Lalit	Javed Akhtar	Udit Narayan
Bada Din	1440	Oonche Neeche Parbaton Ke"	Jatin-Lalit	Javed Akhtar	Udit Narayan
Bade Miyan Chote Miyan	1441	"Makna"	Viju Shah	Sameer	Udit Narayan, Amit Kumar
Bade Miyan Chote Miyan	1442	"Deta Jai Jodee"	Viju Shah	Sameer	Kavita Krishnamurthy, Udit Narayan, Sudesh Bhosle
Bade Miyan Chote Miyan	1443	"Kisi Disco Mein Jaayein"	Viju Shah	Sameer	Udit Narayan
Badmaash	1444	"Saari Duniya Kare"	Shyam-Surender	Satish	solo
Banarasi Babu	1445	"Meri Gori Gori"	Anand–Milind	Sameer	Kumar Sanu
Bandhan	1446	"Tere Dum Se Hai"	Himesh Reshammiya	Sudhakar Sharma	Kumar Sanu
Bandhan	1447	"Chhora Fisal Gaya"	Himesh Reshammiya	Sudhakar Sharma	Udit Narayan
Bandhan	1448	"Balle Balle"	Himesh Reshammiya	Sudhakar Sharma	Abhijeet, Sapna Awasthi
Barood	1449	"Hum To Tujhse Mohabbat"	Anand–Milind	Sameer	Kumar Sanu
Barood	1450	"Ek Ladka Ek Ladki"	Anand–Milind	Sameer	Kumar Sanu
Barood	1451	"Raazi Raazi"	Anand–Milind	Sameer	Udit Narayan
Barsaat Ki Raat	1452	"Aa Chhup Jayen Sanam"	Laxmikant-Pyarelal	Anand Bakshi	Mohammed Aziz
Barsaat Ki Raat	1453	"Maine Dil Ki Hum Sun Liya"	Laxmikant-Pyarelal	Anand Bakshi	Mohammed Aziz
Barsaat Ki Raat	1454	"Saari Duniya Mein Na Milegi"	Laxmikant-Pyarelal	Anand Bakshi	Udit Narayan
China Gate	1455	"Chamma Chamma"	Anu Malik	Sameer	Shankar Mahadevan, Vinod Rathod
Dahek	1456	"Tujhe Dekhte Hi"	Aadesh Shrivastava	Dev Kohli	Kumar Sanu
Dahek	1457	"Ho Gori Aajaa Mere Dil Men"	Aadesh Shrivastava	Dev Kohli	Sunidhi Chauhan, Udit Narayan, Vinod Rathod
Dahek	1458	"Meri Jaan Hai Tu"	Aadesh Shrivastava	Madan Pal	solo
Dand Nayak	1459	"Dushman Se Bhi Pyar Karo"	Rajesh Roshan		Sonu Nigam
Dand Nayak	1460	"Tera Bhi Ye Haal Huya"	Rajesh Roshan		Kumar Sanu
Dand Nayak	1461	"Ek Sau Do Ek Sau Teen"	Rajesh Roshan		Vinod Rathod
Deewana Hoon Pagal Nahi	1462	"Nazaron Mein Rang Hai"	Aadesh Shrivastava	Anwar Sagar	Udit Narayan
Deewana Hoon Pagal Nahi	1463	"Deewana Hoon"	Aadesh Shrivastava	Dev Kohli	solo
Devta	1464	"Dheere Dheere Ankh Ladi"	Dilip Sen-Sameer Sen	Dev Kohli, Anwar Sagar, Satya Prakash	Udit Narayan
Dhoondte Reh Jaaoge!	1465	"Na Tum Bolo"	Jatin-Lalit	Sameer	Kumar Sanu
Dhoondte Reh Jaaoge!	1466	"Aaja Aaye Majaa"	Jatin-Lalit	Sameer	Udit Narayan
Dhoondte Reh Jaaoge!	1467	"Bolun Kisi Se To"	Jatin-Lalit	Sameer	solo
Dhoondte Reh Jaaoge!	1468	"Jaaneman Jo Hua"	Jatin-Lalit	Sameer	Udit Narayan, Abhijeet
Do Numbri	1469	"Ankhon Ki Chandni"	Tabun Sutradhar	Mumtaz Rashid	Kumar Sanu
Do Numbri	1470	"Main To Deewana Hoon"	Tabun Sutradhar	Praveen Bhardwaj	Abhijeet
Duplicate	1471	"Mere Mehboob Mere Sanam"	Anu Malik	Javed Akhtar	Udit Narayan
Duplicate	1472	"Tum Nahin Jaana"	Anu Malik	Javed Akhtar	Udit Narayan, Shankar Mahadevan
Ghulam	1473	"Aati Kya Khandala"	Jatin-Lalit	Indeevar, Nitin Raikwar, Sameer and Vinod Mahendra	Aamir Khan
Ghulam	1474	"Aankhon Se Tune Yeh Kya Kehe Diya"	Jatin-Lalit	Indeevar, Nitin Raikwar, Sameer and Vinod Mahendra	Kumar Sanu
Ghulam	1475	"Jadu Hai Tera Hi Jadu"	Jatin-Lalit	Indeevar, Nitin Raikwar, Sameer and Vinod Mahendra	Kumar Sanu
Ghulam	1476	Ab Naam Mohabbat Ke"	Jatin-Lalit	Indeevar, Nitin Raikwar, Sameer and Vinod Mahendra	Udit Narayan
Ghulam	1477	Saath Jo Tera Mil Gaya"	Jatin-Lalit	Indeevar, Nitin Raikwar, Sameer and Vinod Mahendra	Udit Narayan
Hafta Vasuli	1478	"Ramji Parwano Se Bachaye"	Rajesh Roshan	Maya Govind	solo
Hero Hindustani	1479	"Chand Nazar Aa Gaya"	Anu Malik	Gauhar Kanpuri	Sonu Nigam, Iqbal, Afzal
Hero Hindustani	1480	"Mahe Ramzan"	Anu Malik	Gauhar Kanpuri	Sonu Nigam, Iqbal, Afzal
Hero Hindustani	1481	"Hero Hindustani"	Anu Malik	Rahat Indori	Kumar Sanu
Hero Hindustani	1482	"Hero Hindustani" (sad)	Anu Malik	Rahat Indori	solo
Himmatwala	1483	"Dil Ka Raja"	Tabun Sutradhar	Dev Kohli	Abhijeet
Hitler	1484	"Main Teri Murga"	Dilip Sen-Sameer Sen	Sameer	Abhijeet
Hitler	1485	"O Meri Chudi"	Dilip Sen-Sameer Sen	Sameer	Udit Narayan
Imaan Beimaan	1486	"Meri Zindagi Ke Maalik"	Rajesh Roshan	Indeevar	Udit Narayan
Imaan Beimaan	1487	"Hare Rama Hare Krishna"	Rajesh Roshan	Indeevar	Udit Narayan
Imaan Beimaan	1488	"Tikhi Tu Jitni Hai"	Rajesh Roshan	Indeevar	Abhijeet
Imaan Beimaan	1489	"Aaj Na Chhodunga"	Rajesh Roshan	Indeevar	Kunar Sanu
Iski Topi Uske Sarr	1490	"Pehli Baar Milke"	Anu Malik	Faiz Anwar	Abhijeet
Jaane Jigar	1491	"Naaraaz Kyun Ho Humse"	Rajesh Roshan	Javed Akhtar	Abhijeet
Jab Pyaar Kisise Hota Hai	1492	"Dil Mein Basa Tha"	Jatin-Lalit	Anand Bakshi	Kumar Sanu
Jab Pyaar Kisise Hota Hai	1493	"Ek Dil Tha Paas Mere"	Jatin-Lalit	Anand Bakshi	Kumar Sanu
Jab Pyaar Kisise Hota Hai	1494	"Chal Pyaar Karegi"	Jatin-Lalit	Anand Bakshi	Sonu Nigam
Jhooth Bole Kauwa Kaate	1495	"Aankhon Mein"	Anand–Milind	Anand Bakshi	Udit Narayan
Jhooth Bole Kauwa Kaate	1496	"Dil Yeh Dil"	Anand–Milind	Anand Bakshi	Udit Narayan
Jhooth Bole Kauwa Kaate	1497	"Mama I Love You"	Anand–Milind	Anand Bakshi	Vinod Rathod
Jhooth Bole Kauwa Kaate	1498	"Badi Mushkil"	Anand–Milind	Anand Bakshi	Udit Narayan, Abhijeet, Vinod Rathod
Jiyaala	1499	"Tu Hi Tu"	Altamash Khan	Wajda Tabassum	Kumar Sanu
Jiyaala	1500	"Pat Pat Patakha"	Altamash Khan	Wajda Tabassum	Kumar Sanu
Kabhi Na Kabhi	1501	"Mil Gayi Mil Gayi"	A.R. Rahman	Javed Akhtar	Kumar Sanu
Keemat – They Are Back	1502	"Nahi Kahi Thi Baat"	Rajesh Roshan	Javed Akhtar	Udit Narayan
Keemat – They Are Back	1503	"Mere Humsafar"	Rajesh Roshan	Indeevar	Kumar Sanu
Keemat – They Are Back	1504	"O Meri Chaila"	Rajesh Roshan	Indeevar	Kavita Krishnamurthy, Babul Supriyo, Nayan Rathod
Khote Sikkey	1505	"Saari Duniya Bole"	Rajesh Roshan	Indeevar	Kumar Sanu
Khote Sikkey	1506	"Dhak Dhak Dhadke Dil Yeh Mera"	Rajesh Roshan	Indeevar	Udit Narayan
Khote Sikkey	1507	"Sabiha Keh De Haan"	Rajesh Roshan	Maya Govind	Kumar Sanu
Kuch Kuch Hota Hai	1508	"Kuch Kuch Hota Hai"	Jatin-Lalit	Sameer	Udit Narayan
Kuch Kuch Hota Hai	1509	"Yeh Ladka Hai"	Jatin-Lalit	Sameer	Udit Narayan
Kuch Kuch Hota Hai	1510	"Ladki Badi Anjani Hai"	Jatin-Lalit	Sameer	Kumar Sanu
Kuch Kuch Hota Hai	1511	"Koi Mil Gaya"	Jatin-Lalit	Sameer	Udit Narayan, Kavita Krishnamurthy
Kuch Kuch Hota Hai	1512	"Kuch Kuch Hota Hai" (Sad Version)	Jatin-Lalit	Sameer	solo
Kuch Kuch Hota Hai	1513	"Saajan Ji Ghar Aaye"	Jatin-Lalit	Sameer	Kumar Sanu, Kavita Krishnamurthy
Kuch Kuch Hota Hai	1514	"Tujhe Yaad Na Meri Aayee"	Jatin-Lalit	Sameer	Manreet Akhtar, Udit Narayan
Kuch Kuch Hota Hai	1515	"Raghupati Raghav"	Jatin-Lalit	Sameer	Shankar Mahadevan
Kudrat	1516	"Ishq Bhala Kya Hai"	Rajesh Roshan	Indeevar	Vinod Rathod
Kudrat	1517	"Deewane Do Dil Mile"	Rajesh Roshan	Dev Kohli	Udit Narayan
Love Story 98	1518	"Tanha Tanha Dil Mera"	Bappi Lahiri	Sunil Jha	solo
Love Story 98	1519	"Kali Kali Aankhon Wali"	Bappi Lahiri	Nawab Arzoo	Udit Narayan
Love Story 98	1520	"Chun Liya Hai"	Bappi Lahiri	Nawab Arzoo	Bappi Lahiri
Mahayudh	1521	"Leke Tera Naam"	Laxmikant-Pyarelal	Anand Bakshi	Sonu Nigam
Main Phir Aaoongi	1522	"Tanhai Ne Li Angdai"	Sameer-Shyam	Zainab Bhai	Kumar Sanu
Main Solah Baras Ki	1523	"Main Solah Baras Ki"	Rajesh Roshan	Amit Khanna	solo
Main Solah Baras Ki	1524	"Main Pukaaroon Aa Bhija"	Rajesh Roshan	Amit Khanna	Kumar Sanu
Main Solah Baras Ki	1525	"Pal Ye Kehta Hai"	Rajesh Roshan	Amit Khanna	Udit Narayan, Kumar Sanu
Major Saab	1526	"Pyaar Tumse Karna Hai"	Anand Raj Anand	Anand Raj Anand	Anand Raj Anand
Mard	1527	"Ankhon Mein Hai Kya"	Dilip Sen-Sameer Sen		Kumar Sanu
Mohabbat Aur Jung	1528	"Dil Leke Hathon Mein"	Dilip Sen-Sameer Sen	Maya Govind, Rani Malik, Nawab Arzoo	Kumar Sanu
Naseeb	1529	"Chaanda Sitare"	Nadeem-Shravan	Sameer	Udit Narayan
Pardesi Babu	1530	"Hai Nazuk Nazuk"	Anand Raj Anand	Anand Raj Anand	Anand Raj Anand, Aditya Narayan
Pyaar Kiya To Darna Kya	1531	"Odh Li Chunariya"	Himesh Reshammiya	Sameer	Kumar Sanu
Pyaar To Hona Hi Tha	1532	"Aaj Hai Sagai"	Jatin-Lalit	Sameer	Abhijeet
Qila	1533	"Tere Bin O Dilbar"	Anand Raj Anand	Dev Kohli	solo
Saat Rang Ke Sapne	1534	"Saat Rang Ke Sapne"	Nadeem-Shravan	Sameer	M. G. Sreekumar
Saat Rang Ke Sapne	1535	"Aati Hai To Chal"	Nadeem-Shravan	Sameer	Babul Supriyo
Saat Rang Ke Sapne	1536	"Ba Ba Batao Na"	Nadeem-Shravan	Sameer	Babul Supriyo
Saazish	1537	"Dil Yeg Kahe"	Jatin-Lalit	Hasrat Jaipuri	solo
Salaakhen	1538	"Dil Mera Le Gayi"	Dilip Sen-Sameer Sen	Sameer	Kumar Sanu
Sar Utha Ke Jiyo	1539	"Ya Allah Mujko Bacha"	Anand–Milind	Sameer	Abhijeet
Sham Ghansham	1540	"Mitwa Re"	Vishal Bhardwaj	Anand Bakshi	Kumar Sanu
Sham Ghansham	1541	"Choli Ka Dil Lena" (remix)	Vishal Bhardwaj	Anand Bakshi	Ila Arun, Anamika
Sham Ghansham	1542	"Ma Pe Put"	Vishal Bhardwaj	Anand Bakshi	Ram Shankar
Sherkhan	1543	"Akhiyan Churanewali"	Bappi Lahiri	Nawab Arzoo, Hasrat Jaipuri	Kumar Sanu
Soldier	1544	"Soldier Soldier"	Anu Malik	Sameer	Kumar Sanu
Soldier	1545	"Mehfil Mein Baar Baar"	Anu Malik	Sameer	Kumar Sanu
Soldier	1546	"Dil Jigar Se Guzri Hain"	Anu Malik	Sameer	Kumar Sanu
Soldier	1547	"Mere Khwabon Mein Jo Aaye"	Anu Malik	Sameer	solo
Tirchhi Topiwale	1548	"Dil Ko Gate Ki"	Anand Raj Anand	Shyam Anuragi	Abhijeet
Wajood	1549	"Aur Hum Tum"	Anu Malik	Javed Akhtar	Kumar Sanu
Wajood	1550	"Main Sochta Hoon"	Anu Malik	Javed Akhtar	Kumar Sanu
Wajood	1551	"Main Kya Karoon"	Anu Malik	Javed Akhtar	solo
Yeh Aashiqui Meri	1552	"Yeh Aashiqui Meri"	Ajit Varman	Dev Kohli	Kumar Sanu
Yugpurush	1553	"Hello Hello Aayee"	Rajesh Roshan	Majrooh Sultanpuri	solo
Zakhm	1554	"Gali Mein Aaj Chand"	M. M. Keeravani	Anand Bakshi	solo
Zakhm	1555	"Raat Sari Bekarari Mein Guzari"	M. M. Keeravani	Anand Bakshi	solo
Zakhm	1556	"Pad Likh Ke"	M. M. Keeravani	Anand Bakshi	solo
Zakhm	1557	"Hum Yahan Tum Yahan"	M. M. Keeravani	Anand Bakshi	solo
Zakhm	1558	Gali Mein Aaj Chaand Nikla (Sad version)	M. M. Keeravani	Anand Bakshi	solo
Zanjeer	1559	"Tujhe Dekh Ke Pehli Baar"	Anand–Milind	Dev Kohli	Udit Narayan
Zanjeer	1560	"Don't Touch My Ghaghariya"	Anand–Milind	Dev Kohli	Vinod Rathod
Zanjeer	1561	"Main Hoon Dehradun Ka Tota"	Anand–Milind	Dev Kohli	Abhijeet

=== 1999 ===
Film	No	Song	Composer(s)	Writer(s)	Co-artist(s)
Aa Ab Laut Chalen	1562	"O Yaaro Maaf Karna"	Nadeem-Shravan	Sameer	Kumar Sanu, Abhijeet, Shabbir Kumar, Sonu Nigam, Saud Khan & Vijeta
Aa Ab Laut Chalen	1563	"O Yaaro Maaf Karna" (part II)	Nadeem-Shravan	Sameer	Kumar Sanu
Aa Ab Laut Chalen	1564	"Yeh Kaisi Mulaqat Hai"	Nadeem-Shravan	Sameer	Kumar Sanu
Aa Ab Laut Chalen	1565	"Aa Ab Laut Chalen"	Nadeem-Shravan	Sameer	Udit Narayan
Aa Ab Laut Chalen	1566	"Mera Dil Tera Deewana"	Nadeem-Shravan	Sameer	solo
Aa Ab Laut Chalen	1567	"Yehi Hai Pyar"	Nadeem-Shravan	Sameer	Udit Narayan, Jaspinder Narula
Aaag Hi Aag	1568	"I am Waiting"	Babul Bose	Nawab Arzoo	Abhijeet Bhattacharya
Aaag Hi Aag	1569	"Tujhe Apna Banane Ko"	Babul Bose	Nawab Arzoo	Abhijeet Bhattacharya
Aaag Hi Aag	1570	"Yeh Kya Hua"	Babul Bose	Nawab Arzoo	Arun Bakshi"
Aaag Hi Aag	1571	"Jab Tera Ishq"	Babul Bose	Nawab Arzoo	Udit Narayan
Aaag Hi Aag	1572	"Jab Tera Ishq" (female)	Babul Bose	Nawab Arzoo	solo
Aarzoo	1573	"Ab Tere Dil Mein To"	Anu Malik	Anand Bakshi	Kumar Sanu
Aarzoo	1574	"Mil Jaate Hain"	Anu Malik	Anand Bakshi	Kumar Sanu
Aarzoo	1575	"Sajan Sajan Teri Dulhan"	Anu Malik	Anand Bakshi	solo
Aarzoo	1576	"Dosti Karte Nahin"	Anu Malik	Anand Bakshi	Kumar Sanu, Udit Narayan
Anari No.1	1577	"Dheere Dheere Ham Donon Mieen"	Aadesh Shrivastava	Dev Kohli	Abhijeet
Anari No.1	1578	"Tujhe Dekh Ke Jaane Jana"	Dileep Sen-Sameer Sen	Dev Kohli	Sonu Nigam
Arjun Pandit	1579	"O Priya" (version 1)	Dileep Sen-Sameer Sen	Javed Akhtar	Hariharan
Arjun Pandit	1580	"O Priya" (version 2)	Dileep Sen-Sameer Sen	Javed Akhtar	Kumar Sanu
Arjun Pandit	1581	"Pyaar Ke Geet"	Dileep Sen-Sameer Sen	Javed Akhtar	Abhijeet Bhattacharya
Arjun Pandit	1582	"Kudiyan Sheher Diyan"	Daler Mehndi	Javed Akhtar	Daler Mehndi
Baadshah	1583	"Hum To Deewane"	Anu Malik	Sameer	Abhijeet Bhattacharya
Baadshah	1584	"Mohabbat Ho Gayee Hain"	Anu Malik	Sameer	Abhijeet Bhattacharya
Bade Dilwala	1585	"Apne Mehboob Ki"	Aadesh Shrivastava	Faiz Anwar	Udit Narayan
Bade Dilwala	1586	"Mujhe Aisa Ladka"	Aadesh Shrivastava	Qateel Shifai	solo
Bade Dilwala	1587	"Jawan Jawan Hai"	Aadesh Shrivastava	Qateel Shifai	Hariharan
Bade Dilwala	1588	"Baant Raha Tha"	Aadesh Shrivastava	Qateel Shifai	Udit Narayan, Shankar Mahadevan
Biwi No.1	1589	"Mehboob Mere"	Anu Malik	Sameer	Sukhwinder Singh
Biwi No.1	1590	"Hai Mirchi"	Anu Malik	Sameer	Sukhwinder Singh
Biwi No.1	1591	"Mujhe Maaf Karna"	Anu Malik	Sameer	Abhijeet Bhattacharya, Anmol Malik, Aditya Narayan
Chehraa	1592	"Hadh Se Jyada Aati Hai"	Anu Malik	Sameer	Kumar Sanu
Chehraa	1593	"Ye Aur Baat Hai"	Anu Malik	Sameer	Kumar Sanu
Chehraa	1594	"Tere Badan Mein"	Anu Malik	Sameer	Kumar Sanu
Chehraa	1595	"Tere Badan Mein" (version 2)	Anu Malik	Sameer	Kumar Sanu
Chehraa	1596	"Chehra Apna Dekhte Hai"	Anu Malik	Sameer	Kumar Sanu
Chehraa	1597	"Sach Much Mein To"		Sameer	Kumar Sanu
Daag: The Fire	1598	"Pyaar Hume Pyaar"	Rajesh Roshan	Sameer	Udit Narayan
Dil Kya Kare	1599	"Dil Kya Kare"	Jatin-Lalit	Anand Bakshi	Udit Narayan
Dil Kya Kare	1600	"Dil Kya Kare" (sad)	Jatin-Lalit	Anand Bakshi	Kumar Sanu
Dil Kya Kare	1601	"Pyar Ke Liye"	Jatin-Lalit	Anand Bakshi	solo
Dil Kya Kare	1602	"Rang Lage Lo"	Jatin-Lalit	Anand Bakshi	Abhijeet Bhattacharya
Dillagi	1603	"Dillagi"	Shankar–Ehsaan–Loy	Javed Akhtar	Kavita Krishnamurthy, Abhijeet, Udit Narayan, Sonu Nigam, Sukhwinder Singh, Shankar Mahadevan, Shaan, Jaspinder Narula, Mahalaxmi Iyer
Dillagi	1604	"Koi Nahin Aisa"	Jatin Lalit	Javed Akhtar	Amit Kumar
Dillagi	1605	"Rahon Mein Chhayee"	Shankar–Ehsaan–Loy	Javed Akhtar	Udit Narayan, Shankar Mahadevan
Do Jism Ek Jaan Hain Hum	1606	"Kudi Tu Hai Chikna"	Vakil Baboo	Dev Kohli	Kumar Sanu
Do Jism Ek Jaan Hain Hum	1607	"Jabse Dil Lagaya"	Vakil Baboo	Dev Kohli	Kumar Sanu
Do Jism Ek Jaan Hain Hum	1608	"Neend Hi Ud Gayi Hain"	Vakil Baboo	Dev Kohli	Kumar Sanu
Do Jism Ek Jaan Hain Hum	1609	"Ankhon Mein Jaadu Hain Meri"	Vakil Baboo	Dev Kohli	Udit Narayan
Do Jism Ek Jaan Hain Hum	1610	"Chham Chham Karti Aayi Jawani"	Vakil Baboo	Dev Kohli	
Gair	1611	"Tu Aaja Meri Bahon Mein"	Anand–Milind	Sameer	Kumar Sanu
Gair	1612	"Aaj Ki Raat Naya Geet"	Anand–Milind	Sameer	Kumar Sanu
Haseena Maan Jaayegi	1613	"Yoon Hua"	Anu Malik	Sameer	Sonu Nigam
Haseena Maan Jaayegi	1614	"What is Mobile Number"	Anu Malik	Sameer	Sonu Nigam
Haseena Maan Jaayegi	1615	"I Love You Bol Daal"	Anu Malik	Nitin Raikwar	Sonu Nigam, Sudesh Bhosle
Hello Brother	1616	"Chandi Ki Daal Par"	Himesh Reshammiya	Sudhakar Sharma	Salman Khan
Hello Brother	1617	"Teri Chunariya"	Himesh Reshammiya	Sudhakar Sharma	Kumar Sanu
Hello Brother	1618	"Teri Chunariya" (remix)	Himesh Reshammiya	Sudhakar Sharma	Kumar Sanu
Hello Brother	1619	"Chupke Se Koi"	Sajid-Wajid	Udit Narayan	Faiz Anwar
Hello Brother	1620	"Chupke Se Koi" (remix)	Sajid-Wajid	Udit Narayan	Faiz Anwar
Hindustan Ki Kasam	1621	"Mera Dil Nai Lagda"	Sukhwinder Singh	Anand Bakshi	solo
Hindustan Ki Kasam	1622	"Ranjhana Ve"	Sukhwinder Singh	Anand Bakshi	solo
Hindustan Ki Kasam	1623	"Akhiyan Akhiyan"	Sukhwinder Singh	Anand Bakshi	Udit Narayan
Hogi Pyaar Ki Jeet	1624	"Taalon Mein Nainital"	Anand–Milind	Sameer	Sonu Nigam
Hogi Pyaar Ki Jeet	1625	"Lakhon Aashiq Mar Jaate"	Anand–Milind	Sameer	Udit Narayan, Abhijeet, Jaspinder Narula
Hote Hote Pyar Ho Gaya	1626	"Hote Hote Pyar Ho Gaya"	Anand Raj Anand	Rani Malik	Abhijeet Bhattacharya
Hote Hote Pyar Ho Gaya	1627	"Laddu Motichur Ka"	Anand Raj Anand	Rani Malik	Poornima
Hum Aapke Dil Mein Rehte Hain	1628	"Chhup Gaye"	Anu Malik	Sameer	Udit Narayan
Hum Dil De Chuke Sanam	1629	"Chand Chupa Badal Mein"	Ismail Darbar	Mehboob	Udit Narayan
Hum Saath-Saath Hain: We Stand United	1630	"Hum Saath Saath Hain"	Raam Laxman	Dev Kohli	Kumar Sanu, Hariharan, Anuradha Paudwal, Udit Narayan, Kavita Krishnamurthy
Hum Saath-Saath Hain: We Stand United	1631	"Mhare Hiwda"	Raam Laxman	R Kiran	Kavita Krishnamurthy, Hariharan, Kumar Sanu, Udit Narayan, Anuradha Paudwal
Hum Saath-Saath Hain: We Stand United	1632	"Maiyya Yashoda"	Raam Laxman	R Kiran	Kavita Krishnamurthy, Anuradha Paudwal
International Khiladi	1633	"Chhookar Mere Mann Ko"	Aadesh Shrivastava	Dev Kohli	Kumar Sanu
International Khiladi	1634	"Kudi Kanwari"	Aadesh Shrivastava	Dev Kohli	Roop Kumar Rathod
International Khiladi	1635	"Saiyan Saiyan"	Aadesh Shrivastava	Dev Kohli	Abhijeet Bhattacharya
Jaanam Samjha Karo	1636	"Sabki Baratein Aayi Doli Tu Bhi Lana"	Anu Malik	Majrooh Sultanpuri	solo
Jaanam Samjha Karo	1637	"Kisi Ne Humse Kiya Hai Vaada"	Anu Malik	Majrooh Sultanpuri	solo
Jaanam Samjha Karo	1638	"Love Hua"	Anu Malik	Majrooh Sultanpuri	Kumas Sanu
Jaanwar	1639	"Mere Sapno Ke Rajkumar"	Anand–Milind	Sameer	solo
Jaanwar	1640	"Mera Yaar Dildaar"	Anand–Milind	Sameer	Sukhwinder Singh, Sonu Nigam, Jaspinder Narula
Jaanwar	1641	"Kasam Se"	Anand–Milind	Sameer	Udit Narayan
Jaanwar	1642	"Paas Bulati Hai"	Anand–Milind	Sameer	Alka Yagnik
Jaanwar	1643	"Jaanewale O Jaanewale"	Anand–Milind	Sameer	Ram Shankar, Sonu Nigam
Jaanwar	1644	"Mausam Ki Tarah"	Anand–Milind	Sameer	Manhar Udhas, Alka Yagnik
Jai Hind	1645	"Adab Arz Hai"	Laxmikant-Pyarelal	Manoj Kumar	Sonu Nigam
Jai Hind	1646	"Main Kya Hoon Main"	Laxmikant-Pyarelal	Manoj Kumar	Kavita Krishnamurthy, Nitin Mukesh
Jai Hind	1647	"Mombatiye Mombatiye"	Laxmikant-Pyarelal	Manoj Kumar	solo
Jai Hind	1648	"Sakhi Re Tere Naina"	Laxmikant-Pyarelal	Manoj Kumar	Reema Dasgupta
Jai Hind	1649	"Padosan Pakdi Gaye"	Laxmikant-Pyarelal	Verma Malik	Udit Narayan
Jai Hind	1650	"Pani O Pani"	Laxmikant-Pyarelal	Maya Govind	Nitin Mukesh
Kachche Dhaage	1651	"Ek Jawani Teri Ek Jawani"	Nusrat Fateh Ali Khan	Anand Bakshi	Kumar Sanu
Kachche Dhaage	1652	"Pyaar Nahin Karna"	Nusrat Fateh Ali Khan	Anand Bakshi	Kumar Sanu
Kachche Dhaage	1653	"Khali Dil Nahin Jaan"	Nusrat Fateh Ali Khan	Anand Bakshi	Hans Raj Hans
Kartoos	1654	"Gham Hai Ya Khushi"	Nusrat Fateh Ali Khan	Majrooh Sultanpuri	solo
Kohram	1655	"Tere Dil Pe Naam Likh Doon"	Dileep Sen-Sameer Sen	Anand Bakshi	Hariharan
Kohram	1656	"Ladki Ladki Tu Woh Lakdi"	Dileep Sen-Sameer Sen	Sameer	Abhijeet
Laawaris	1657	"Seene Mein Sulagti Hai Dil"	Rajesh Roshan	Javed Akhtar	Roop Kumar Rathod
Laawaris	1658	"Aa Kahin Door Chale"	Rajesh Roshan	Javed Akhtar	Udit Narayan
Lal Baadshah	1659	"Dil Ki Dhadkan Bole"	Aadesh Shrivastava	Maya Govind	Udit Narayan, Sapna Awasthi
Lal Baadshah	1660	"Ek Dinak Dinah Din"	Aadesh Shrivastava	Maya Govind	Sudesh Bhosle
Lal Baadshah	1661	"Mera Munna Jab Jawan Hoga"	Aadesh Shrivastava	Maya Govind	Udit Narayan, Alka Yagnik
Lohpurush	1662	"Main Jatt Ludhianewala"	Dilip Sen-Sameer Sen	Dev Kohli, Nawab Arzoo, Hersh Kinnu	Udit Narayan, Poornima, Dilip Sen
Manchala	1663	"Khata Na Kki Ho Jaaye"	Raam Laxman	Ravinder Rawal	Kumar Sanu
Mann	1664	"Mera Mann Kyon Tumhe Chahe"	Sanjeev-Darshan	Sameer	Udit Narayan
Mann	1665	"Tinak Tin Tana"	Sanjeev-Darshan	Sameer	Udit Narayan
Pyaar Koi Khel Nahin	1666	"Kuch Hamare Hain"	Jatin-Lalit	Majrooh Sultanpuri	Udit Narayan
Pyaar Koi Khel Nahin	1667	"Tere Galon Ki"	Jatin-Lalit	Majrooh Sultanpuri	Udit Narayan
Pyaar Koi Khel Nahin	1668	"Nazar Milte Hi"	Jatin-Lalit	Majrooh Sultanpuri	Vinod Rathod
Rajaji	1669	"Raja Chalo Akele Mein"	Anand–Milind	Sameer	Kumar Sanu
Rajaji	1670	"Tere Pyaar Ne"	Anand–Milind	Sameer	solo
Safari	1671	"Aala Re Raoos Aala"	Shyam-Surender	Rani Malik	Amit Kumar
Sar Ankhon Par	1672	"Aapka Pyaar Hai Sar Ankhon Par"	Jatin-Lalit	Indeevar, Anwar Sagar, Vinoo Mahendra	Kumar Sanu
Sar Ankhon Par	1673	"Zindagi Hai Kya"	Jatin-Lalit	Indeevar, Anwar Sagar, Vinoo Mahendra	Kumar Sanu
Sarfarosh	1674	"Meri Raton Ki Neendein Uda De"	Jatin-Lalit	Indeevar	solo
Sarfarosh	1675	"Jo Haal Dil Ka"	Jatin-Lalit	Sameer	Kumar Sanu
Sarfarosh	1676	"Is Deewane Ladke Ko"	Jatin-Lalit	Sameer	Aamir Khan
Silsila Hai Pyar Ka	1677	"Lo Lo Jee Main Aagayee"	Jatin-Lalit	Sameer	solo
Silsila Hai Pyar Ka	1678	"Ye Silsila Hai Pyar Ka"	Jatin-Lalit	Sameer	Kumar Sanu
Silsila Hai Pyar Ka	1679	"Ye Silsila Hai Pyar Ka" (sad)	Jatin-Lalit	Sameer	solo
Sirf Tum	1680	"Pehli Pehli Bar"	Nadeem-Shravan	Sameer	Kumar Sanu
Sirf Tum	1680	"Dilbar Dilbar"	Nadeem-Shravan	Sameer	Solo
Taal	1681	"Taal Se Taal Mila"	A. R. Rahman	Anand Bakshi	Udit Narayan
Taal	1682	"Ramta Jogi"	A. R. Rahman	Anand Bakshi	Sukhwinder Singh
Taal	1683	"Kariye Naa"	A. R. Rahman	Anand Bakshi	Sukhwinder Singh
Yeh Hai Basti Badmashon Ki	1684	"Ankhon Mein Ankhen Daal Ke"	Sonik-Omi	Kulwant Jani	solo
Yeh Hai Mumbai Meri Jaan	1685	"Teri Chahat Ke Deewane"	Jatin-Lalit	Indeevar	Kumar Sanu
Yeh Hai Mumbai Meri Jaan	1686	"Yeh Ghadi Sanam"	Jatin-Lalit	Indeevar	Kumar Sanu
Yeh Hai Mumbai Meri Jaan	1687	"Humko Aawaz De"	Jatin-Lalit	Indeevar	Kumar Sanu
Yeh Hai Mumbai Meri Jaan	1688	"Wada Kiya Humne"	Jatin-Lalit	Indeevar	Kumar Sanu

== 2000s ==
=== 2000 ===
Film	No	Song	Composer(s)	Writer(s)	Co-artist(s)
Aghaat	1689	"Mere Pyaar Ka Sauda Kiya"	Sukhwinder Singh	Naqsh Lyallpuri	solo
Aaghaaz	1690	"Mann Tera Mera Mann"	Anu Malik	Sameer	Babul Supriyo
Aaghaaz	1691	"Dil Ko Pathar"	Anu Malik	Sameer	Kumar Sanu
Aaj Ka Nanha Farishta	1692	"Yeg Duniya Gol Hai"	Bappi Lahiri	Sikander Bharti, Babla, Anwar Sagar	Amit Kumar
Agniputra	1693	"Kisne Dekha Kisne Jaana"	Nikhil-Vinay	Anand Bakshi	Sonu Nigam
Baaghi Aurat	1694	"Teri Aankhon Mein"	Tilakraj Thapar	Jugal Kishore, Tilakraj Thapar	Udit Narayan
Bichhoo	1695	"Pyar Tu Dil Tu"	Anand Raj Anand	Sameer	Vinod Rathod
Bulandi	1696	"Jab Gori Ne"	Viju Shah	Anand Bakshi	Abhijeet Bhattacharya
Chal Mere Bhai	1697	"Chori Chori Sapnon Mein"	Anand–Milind	Sameer	Abhijeet Bhattacharya
Chal Mere Bhai	1698	"Chori Chori Sapnon Mein" (Sad version)	Anand–Milind	Sameer	Abhijeet Bhattacharya
Chal Mere Bhai	1699	"Meri Neend Jaane Lagi Hai"	Anand–Milind	Sameer	Sonu Nigam
Chal Mere Bhai	1700	"Thodi Si Bekarari"	Anand–Milind	Sameer	Kumar Sanu
Chal Mere Bhai	1701	"O Mehndi Rang Layee"	Anand–Milind	Sameer	Udit Narayan, Sonu Nigam, Jaspinder Narula
Champion	1702	"Ek Ladki Jiski Aankhen"	Anu Malik	Javed Akhtar	Udit Narayan
Champion	1703	"Koi Deewane Ko"	Anu Malik	Javed Akhtar	Roop Kumar Rathod
Dahshat	1704	"Gori Ke Gore Gore Gaal"	Deepak Anandji	Sunil Jha	Udit Narayan
Dahshat	1705	"Main Bhi Jawaan"	Deepak Anandji	Sunil Jha	Abhijeet Bhattacharya
Deewane	1706	"Deewane Pyar Ke Hum Hai"	Sanjeev-Darshan	Sameer	Kumar Sanu, Udit Narayan
Deewane	1707	"Qayamat"	Sanjeev-Darshan	Sameer	Sukhwinder Singh
Dhadkan	1708	"Aksar Is Duniya Mein"	Nadeem-Shravan	Sameer	solo
Dhadkan	1709	"Dil Ne Yeh Kaha Dil Se"	Nadeem-Shravan	Sameer	Udit Narayan, Kumar Sanu
Dhadkan	1710	"Dil Ne Yeh Kaha Hai Dil Se" (version 2)	Nadeem-Shravan	Sameer	Sonu Nigam
Dhadkan	1711	"Tum Dil Ki Dhadkan Mein" (duet)	Nadeem-Shravan	Sameer	Abhijeet Bhattacharya
Dhadkan	1712	"Na Na Karte Pyaar"	Nadeem-Shravan	Sameer	Udit Narayan
Dulhan Hum Le Jayenge	1713	"Dulhan Hum Le Jayenge"	Himesh Reshammiya	Sudhakar Sharma	Kumar Sanu & Sunita Rao
Dulhan Hum Le Jayenge	1714	"Mujhse Shaadi Karogi"	Himesh Reshammiya	Sudhakar Sharma	Kumar Sanu, Alka Yagnik, Suresh Wadkar & Shankar Mahadevan
Dulhan Hum Le Jayenge	1715	"Hai Na Bolo"	Himesh Reshammiya	Sudhakar Sharma	Kumar Sanu
Dulhan Hum Le Jayenge	1716	"Chhamiya"	Himesh Reshammiya	Sudhakar Sharma	Sonu Nigam
Dulhan Hum Le Jayenge	1717	"Dheere Dheere Chalna"	Himesh Reshammiya	Sudhakar Sharma	Sonu Nigam
Dulhan Hum Le Jayenge	1718	"Tera Pallu"	Himesh Reshammiya	Sudhakar Sharma	Sonu Nigam
Dulhan Hum Le Jayenge	1719	"O Mr Raja"	Himesh Reshammiya	Sudhakar Sharma	Sonu Nigam
Dulhan Hum Le Jayenge	1720	"Pyar Dilon Ka Mela"	Himesh Reshammiya	Sudhakar Sharma	Sonu Nigam
Ek Hi Manzil	1722	"Aaye Sajna Aadhi Raat"	Khayyam	Ahmed Wasi	solo
Fiza	1723	"Aaja Mahiya"	Anu Malik	Gulzar	Udit Narayan
Fiza	1724	"Tu Fiza Hai"	Anu Malik	Gulzar	Sonu Nigam, Prashant Parashar
Gang	1725	"Bole Chhan Chhanana"	Anu Malik	Javed Akhtar	Anu Malik
Gang	1726	"Kyun Hum Tum Miley"	Anu Malik	Javed Akhtar	Anu Malik
Ghaath	1727	"Yeh Humko Kya Hua Hai"	Anu Malik	Sameer	Hariharan
Ghaath	1728	"Teri Aashiqui"	Anu Malik	Sameer	Pankaj Udhaas
Ghaath	1729	"Jhumka Chandi Da"	Anu Malik	Sameer	Udit Narayan, Sonu Nigam, Jaspinder Narula
Hamara Dil Aapke Paas Hai	1730	"Hamara Dil Aapke Paas Hai"	Sanjeev-Darshan	Javed Akhtar	Udit Narayan
Hamara Dil Aapke Paas Hai	1731	"Shukriya Shukriya"	Sanjeev-Darshan	Javed Akhtar	Udit Narayan
Hamara Dil Aapke Paas Hai	1732	"It's My Family"	Sanjeev-Darshan	Javed Akhtar	Abhijeet Bhattacharya
Hamara Dil Aapke Paas Hai	1733	"Main Teri Hoon"	Sanjeev-Darshan	Javed Akhtar	Abhijeet Bhattacharya
Hamara Dil Aapke Paas Hai	1734	"Tumko Dekha To"	Sanjeev-Darshan	Javed Akhtar	Kumar Sanu
Har Dil Jo Pyaar Karega	1735	"Har Dil Jo Pyar Karega"	Anu Malik	Sameer	Udit Narayan
Har Dil Jo Pyaar Karega	1736	"Dil Dil Deewana"	Anu Malik	Sameer	Udit Narayan
Har Dil Jo Pyaar Karega	1737	"Aate Jaate Jo Milta Hai"	Anu Malik	Sameer	Sonu Nigam
Har Dil Jo Pyaar Karega	1738	"Har Dil Jo Pyar Karega" (sad)	Anu Malik	Sameer	solo
Hera Pheri	1739	"Mujhse Milti Hai Ek Ladki"	Anu Malik	Sameer	Udit Narayan
Hera Pheri	1740	"Sunzara"	Anu Malik	Sameer	Udit Narayan
Hum To Mohabbat Karega	1741	"Tere Aagey Peechey"	Anu Malik	Majrooh Sultanpuri	Kumar Sanu
Hum To Mohabbat Karega	1742	"Yeh Khushi Ki Mehfil"	Anu Malik	Majrooh Sultanpuri	Kumar Sanu
Hum To Mohabbat Karega	1743	"Suno Suno, Kaho Kaho"	Anu Malik	Majrooh Sultanpuri	Kumar Sanu
Hum To Mohabbat Karega	1744	"Dada Maanja Baba Maanja"	Anu Malik	Majrooh Sultanpuri	Anu Malik
Jaalsaaz	1745	"Kangana Bole Khanan Khanan"	Dilip Sen-Sameer Sen	Sameer	Kumar Sanu
Joru Ka Ghulam	1746	"Woh Aayee"	Aadesh Shrivastava	Sameer	Sonu Nigam
Joru Ka Ghulam	1747	"Khula Hai Mera Pinjara"	Aadesh Shrivastava	Sameer	Kumar Sanu
Josh	1748	"Hum To Dil Se Haare"	Anu Malik	Sameer	Udit Narayan
Josh	1749	"Hai Mera Dil"	Anu Malik	Sameer	Udit Narayan
Jung	1750	"Aila Re Ladki"	Anu Malik	Sameer	Anu Malik
Jung	1751	"Mere Bina Tum"	Anu Malik	Sameer	Kumar Sanu
Kahin Pyaar Na Ho Jaaye	1752	"Kahin Pyar Na Ho Jaaye"	Himesh Reshammiya	Rajesh Malik	Alka Yagnik, Kumar Sanu
Kahin Pyaar Na Ho Jaaye	1753	"Kahin Pyar Na Ho Jaaye" (part 2)	Himesh Reshammiya	Rajesh Malik	Sonu Nigam
Kahin Pyaar Na Ho Jaaye	1754	"O Priya O Priya"	Himesh Reshammiya	Sudhakar Sharma	Kamaal Khan, Kumar Sanu and Nitin Mukesh
Kahin Pyaar Na Ho Jaaye	1755	"Pardesi" (I)	Himesh Reshammiya	Sudhakar Sharma	Sonu Nigam
Kahin Pyaar Na Ho Jaaye	1756	"Sawariya Re O Sawariya"	Himesh Reshammiya	Sudhakar Sharma	Kamaal Khan
Kahin Pyaar Na Ho Jaaye	1757	"Parody"	Himesh Reshammiya	Sudhakar Sharma	Kumar Sanu, Sonu Nigam
Kaho Naa... Pyaar Hai	1758	"Kaho Naa Pyaar Hai"	Rajesh Roshan	Ibrahim Ashq	Udit Narayan
Kaho Naa... Pyaar Hai	1759	"Pyar Ki Kashti Mein"	Rajesh Roshan	Sawan Kumar Tak	Udit Narayan
Karobaar	1760	"Sunona Sunona"	Rajesh Roshan	Javed Akhtar	Kumar Sanu
Karobaar	1761	"Chahiye Milne Ka Bahana"	Rajesh Roshan	Javed Akhtar	Kumar Sanu
Karobaar	1762	"Arzoo Ki Rahon Mein"	Rajesh Roshan	Javed Akhtar	Udit Narayan
Khauff	1763	"Nateeja Hamari Mohabbat Ka"	Anu Malik	Rahat Indori	Kumar Sanu
Khauff	1764	"Saiyan More Saiyan"	Anu Malik	Rani Malik	Sapna Awasthi, Shankar Mahadevan, Ehsaan
Khauff	1765	"Kehte Hain Jo Log"	Anu Malik	N/A	Sukhwinder Singh, Alka Yagnik
Khiladi 420	1766	"Dil Le Le"	Sanjeev-Darshan	Sameer	Abhijeet Bhattacharya
Kothewali	1767	"Koi Khayal Ban Ke"	Pappu Khan	N/A	solo
Krodh	1768	"Mera Kangna"	Anand–Milind	Dev Kohli	Abhijeet Bhattacharya
Krodh	1769	"Jaanejana Jaanejana"	Anand–Milind	Dev Kohli	solo
Krodh	1770	"What To Do"	Anand–Milind	Deepak Chaudhary	Udit Narayan
Kunwara	1771	"Jab Ladka Ho Kunwara"	Aadesh Shrivastava	Sameer	Sonu Nigam
Kunwara	1772	"Jab Ladki Ho Kunwara" (remix)	Aadesh Shrivastava	Sameer	Sonu Nigam
Kunwara	1773	"Meri Chamak Chalo"	Aadesh Shrivastava	Sameer	Sonu Nigam
Kunwara	1774	"Urmila Re Urmila"	Aadesh Shrivastava	Sameer	Sonu Nigam
Kunwara	1775	"Urmila Re Urmila" (remix)	Aadesh Shrivastava	Sameer	Sonu Nigam
Kunwara	1776	"Mehndi Lagake"	Aadesh Shrivastava	Sameer	Kumar Sanu
Kunwara	1777	"Yeh Ladki Jawaan"	Aadesh Shrivastava	Sameer	Kumar Sanu
Kunwara	1778	"Yeh Ladki Jawaan" (remix)	Aadesh Shrivastava	Sameer	Kumar Sanu
Kurukshetra	1779	"Aap Ka Aana"	Amar Haldipur, Himesh Reshammiya	Dev Kohli	Kumar Sanu
Kurukshetra	1780	"Janam Tere Liye"	Amar Haldipur, Himesh Reshammiya	Sudhakar Sharma	Kumar Sanu
Kurukshetra	1781	"Chal Shadi Kar"	Amar Haldipur, Himesh Reshammiya	Sudhakar Sharma	Kumar Sanu
Kurukshetra	1782	"Ishq Bhi Kya Cheez Hai"	Amar Haldipur, Himesh Reshammiya	Sudhakar Sharma	Kumar Sanu, Sonu Nigam
Kya Kehna	1783	"Dekhiye Aji Janeman"	Rajesh Roshan	Majrooh Sultanpuri	Udit Narayan
Kya Kehna	1784	"Ae Sanam Meri Bahon"	Rajesh Roshan	Majrooh Sultanpuri	Kumar Sanu
Kya Kehna	1785	"In Kadmon Ke Neeche"	Rajesh Roshan	Majrooh Sultanpuri	Kumar Sanu
Kya Kehna	1786	"Pyara Bhaiya Mera"	Rajesh Roshan	Majrooh Sultanpuri	Kumar Sanu
Kya Kehna	1787	"Jaaneman Jaane Jaan"	Rajesh Roshan	Majrooh Sultanpuri	Sonu Nigam
Kya Kehna	1788	"O Soniye Dil Jaaniye"	Rajesh Roshan	Majrooh Sultanpuri	Kumar Sanu, Sonu Nigam
Le Chal Apne Sang	1789	"Dil Ne Pukara Janam"	Raam Laxman	Dev Kohli	Udit Narayan
Le Chal Apne Sang	1790	"Le Chal Apne Sang"	Raam Laxman	Shaily Shailendra	solo
Majnu	1791	"Bulleh Shah Tera Ishq Nachaya"	Anu Malik	Anand Bakshi	solo
Mela	1792	"Mela Dilon" (Theme)	Anu Malik	Dharmesh Darshan	Aamir Khan
Mela	1793	"Dhadkan Mein Tum"	Anu Malik	Sameer	Kumar Sanu
Mela	1794	Mela Dilon Ka" (Celebration)	Anu Malik	Dev Kohli	Sonu Nigam, Roop Kumar Rathod, Shankar Mahadevan, Nitin Mukesh, Hema Sardesai, Jaspinder Narula and Anmol Malik
Mela	1795	"Mela Dilon Ka"	Anu Malik	Dev Kohli, Dharmesh Darshan	Abhijeet Bhattacharya, Shankar Mahadevan, Sadhana Sargam, Udit Narayan, Sonu Nigam, Poonam
Mission Kashmir	1796	"Chupke Se Sun"	Shankar–Ehsaan–Loy	Sameer	Udit Narayan
Mission Kashmir	1797	"Socho Ke Jheelon Ka"	Shankar–Ehsaan–Loy	Sameer	Udit Narayan, Shankar Mahadevan
Phir Bhi Dil Hai Hindustani	1798	"Banke Tera Jogi"	Jatin-Lalit	Javed Akhtar	Sonu Nigam
Phir Bhi Dil Hai Hindustani	1799	"Kuch To Bata"	Jatin-Lalit	Javed Akhtar	Abhijeet Bhattacharya
Phir Bhi Dil Hai Hindustani	1800	"Aur Kya"	Jatin-Lalit	Javed Akhtar	Abhijeet Bhattacharya
Raju Chacha	1801	"Ye Waada Hai(Sad)"	Jatin-Lalit	Anand Bakshi	solo
Raju Chacha	1802	"Ye Vaada Hai"	Jatin-Lalit	Anand Bakshi	Kumar Sanu
Refugee	1803	"Mere Humsafar"	Anu Malik	Javed Akhtar	Sonu Nigam
Refugee	1804	"Panchi Nadiyan"	Anu Malik	Javed Akhtar	Sonu Nigam
Refugee	1805	"Aisa Lagta Hai"	Anu Malik	Javed Akhtar	Sonu Nigam
Refugee	1806	"Taal Pe Jab"	Anu Malik	Javed Akhtar	Sonu Nigam
Refugee	1807	"Raat Ke Hatheli Par"	Anu Malik	Javed Akhtar	Udit Narayan
Shikari	1808	"Chali Chali Ri Gori"	Aadesh Shrivastava	Sameer	Vinod Rathod
Sultaan	1809	"Kya Baat Hai"	Bappi Lahiri	Maya Govind	Kumar Sanu
Tapish	1810	"Kabhi Dil Muskurata Hai"	Ashutosh Pathak	Dhruv Ghanekar, Kishore Sharma	Udit Narayan
Tarkieb	1811	"Tujhe Dhoondhun Main"	Aadesh Shrivastava	Nida Fazli	Vinod Rathod
Tarkieb	1812	"Kiska Chehra"	Aadesh Shrivastava	Nida Fazli	Jagjit Singh
Tera Jadoo Chal Gayaa	1813	"Aai Chand Teri"	Ismail Darbar	Sameer	Sonu Nigam
Tera Jadoo Chal Gayaa	1814	"Mujhe Pyar Karo"	Ismail Darbar	Sameer	Sonu Nigam
Tune Mera Dil Le Liya	1815	"Tune Mera Dil Le Liya"	Mahesh-Kishore	Vinoo Mahendra	Udit Narayan

=== 2001 ===
Film	No	Song	Co-artist(s)	Composer(s)	Writer(s)
Aakheer	1816	"Soya Hai Tu"	Abir Mukherjee	Bhisham Kohli	solo
Aakheer	1817	"Hum Aur Tum" (female)	Abir Mukherjee	Bhisham Kohli	solo
Aamdani Atthani Kharcha Rupaiyaa	1818	"Chori Chori Tera Chehra"	Himesh Reshammiya	Sudhakar Sharma	Udit Narayan
Aamdani Atthani Kharcha Rupaiyaa	1819	"Aayee Hai Diwali"	Himesh Reshammiya	Sudhakar Sharma	Udit Narayan, Kumar Sanu, Shaan, Ketki Dave, Sneha Pant
Aashiq	1820	"Gore Gore Gaal Mere"	Sanjeev-Darshan	Sameer	solo
Aashiq	1821	"Aashiq Mujhe Aashiq"	Sanjeev-Darshan	Sameer	Roop Kumar Rathod
Aashiq	1822	"Teri Aankhon Mein"	Sanjeev-Darshan	Sameer	Udit Narayan
Aashiq	1823	"Tum Kya Jaano"	Sanjeev-Darshan	Sameer	Udit Narayan
Aashiq	1824	"Gori Tera Nakhra"	Sanjeev-Darshan	Sameer	Udit Narayan
Afsana Dilwalon Ka	1825	"Agar Qabool Hai Hamara Salaam"	Shyam-Surender	Ibrahim Ashk	Udit Narayan
Ajnabee	1826	"Kaun Main Haan Tum"	Anu Malik	Sameer	Udit Narayan
Ajnabee	1827	"Mohabbat Naam Hai Kiska"	Anu Malik	Sameer	Udit Narayan
Ajnabee	1828	"Kasam Se Teri Aankhen"	Anu Malik	Sameer	Udit Narayan, Sonu Nigam, Hema Sardesai
Albela	1829	"Kaho To Zara"	Jatin-Lalit	Sameer	Kumar Sanu
Albela	1830	"Hai Mera Dil Tu"	Jatin-Lalit	Sameer	Babul Supriyo,
Albela	1831	"Sar Se Sarak Gaye"	Jatin-Lalit	Sameer	Babul Supriyo,
Albela	1832	"Pyaar Ke Jaadoo"	Jatin-Lalit	Sameer	Udit Narayan
Albela	1833	"Haiya Hoo Kya Masti"	Jatin-Lalit	Sameer	Kumar Sanu, Udit Narayan
Albela	1834	"Dil Hamara Hua Hai"	Jatin-Lalit	Sameer	Hariharan
Aśoka	1835	"San Sansana"	Anu Malik	Anand Bakshi	Hema Sardesai
Aśoka	1836	"O Re Kanchi"	Anu Malik	Gulzar	Shaan, Suneeta Rao
Aśoka	1837	"Roshni Se"	Anu Malik	Gulzar	Abhijeet Bhattacharya
Bas Itna Sa Khwaab Hai	1838	"Kya Hua"	Aadesh Shrivastava	Goldie Bahl	Shaan
Bas Itna Sa Khwaab Hai	1839	"Kuch Aisa Jahan" (version 1)	Aadesh Shrivastava	Goldie Bahl	Shaan
Bas Itna Sa Khwaab Hai	1840	"Kuch Aisa Jahan" (version 2)	Aadesh Shrivastava	Goldie Bahl	Shaan
Bas Itna Sa Khwaab Hai	1841	"Yeh Hawaen"	Aadesh Shrivastava	Goldie Bahl	Shaan
Bas Itna Sa Khwaab Hai	1842	"Chhota Sa Mann Hai"	Aadesh Shrivastava	Goldie Bahl	KK
Censor	1843	"Is Taraah Dekho"	Jatin-Lalit	Neeraj	Udit Narayan
Censor	1844	"Yaaron Jo Kal Tak"	Jatin-Lalit	Neeraj	Kumar Sanu, Udit Narayan, Jaspinder Narula
Chhupa Rustam: A Musical Thriller	1845	"O Bangla Gaadi"	Anand–Milind	Anand Bakshi	solo
Chhupa Rustam: A Musical Thriller	1846	"Tu Nikla Chhupa Rustam"	Anand–Milind	Anand Bakshi	solo
Chhupa Rustam: A Musical Thriller	1847	"Yeh Chand Koi Deewana Hai"	Anand–Milind	Anand Bakshi	Kumar Sanu
Chhupa Rustam: A Musical Thriller	1848	"Raja Yeh Kya Karte Ho	Anand–Milind	Anand Bakshi	Kumar Sanu
Chhupa Rustam: A Musical Thriller	1849	"Pyar Mein Dil To"	Anand–Milind	Anand Bakshi	Kumar Sanu
Chingari Aur Sholay	1850	"Tutegi Meri Chudiyan"	Anand–Milind	Onkar Verma, Khalid	Kavita Krishnamurthy
Chori Chori Chupke Chupke	1851	"Chori Chori Chupke Chupke"	Anu Malik	Sameer	Babul Supriyo
Chori Chori Chupke Chupke	1852	"Dekhne Walon Ne"	Anu Malik	Sameer	Udit Narayan
Chori Chori Chupke Chupke	1853	"Deewana Hai Yeh Mann"	Anu Malik	Sameer	Sonu Nigam
Chori Chori Chupke Chupke	1854	"Love You Love You Bolo"	Anu Malik	Sameer	Anu Malik
Daman: A Victim of Marital Violence	1855	"Sun Sun Goria"	Bhupen Hazarika	Maya Govind	Solo
Dil Chahta Hai	1856	"Jaane Kyon"	Shankar–Ehsaan–Loy	Javed Akhtar	Udit Narayan
Dil Churaya Aapne	1857	"Jine Tha Humse Kabhi"	Suresh Wadkar	Rani Malik	solo
Dil Ne Phir Yaad Kiya	1858	"Hosh Men Nahin Hai Dil"	Aadesh Shrivastava	Sameer	Udit Narayan
Dil Ne Phir Yaad Kiya	1859	"Kab Tak Yu Dil"	Aadesh Shrivastava	Sameer	Udit Narayan
Dil Ne Phir Yaad Kiya	1860	"Aaj Nachna"	Aadesh Shrivastava	Sameer	Udit Narayan
Dil Ne Phir Yaad Kiya	1861	"Dil Ne Phir Yaad Kiya"	Aadesh Shrivastava	Sameer	Sonu Nigam
Dil Ne Phir Yaad Kiya	1862	"Ye Mausam"	Aadesh Shrivastava	Sameer	Kumar Sanu
Dil Ne Phir Yaad Kiya	1863	"Chali Chali Re Gori"	Aadesh Shrivastava	Sameer	Vinod Rathod
Ek Rishtaa	1864	"Dil Lagaane Ki Sazaa"	Nadeem-Shravan	Sameer	Kumar Sanu
Ek Rishtaa	1865	"Ek Dil Hai"	Nadeem-Shravan	Sameer	Kumar Sanu
Ek Rishtaa	1866	"Dil Deewana Dhoondta Hai"	Nadeem-Shravan	Sameer	Kumar Sanu
Ek Rishtaa	1867	"Mohabbat Ne Mohabbat Ko"	Nadeem-Shravan	Sameer	Udit Narayan
Ek Rishtaa	1868	"Hum Khush Hue"	Nadeem-Shravan	Sameer	Kumar Sanu, Mohammed Aziz, Sarika Kapoor
Ek Rishtaa	1869	"Mulaqaat"	Nadeem-Shravan	Sameer	solo
Farz	1870	"Mohabbat Ke Din Ho"	Anu Malik	Sameer	Udit Narayan
Farz	1871	"Aelo Aelo Ji"	Uttam Singh	Sameer	Udit Narayan
Farz	1872	"Anjaane (Duet Version)"	Uttam Singh	Sameer	Vital Signs, Lata Mangeshkar
Gadar: Ek Prem Katha	1873	"Udja Kale Kawan"(marriage)	Uttam Singh	Anand Bakshi	Udit Narayan
Gadar: Ek Prem Katha	1874	"Udja Kale Kawan" (search)	Uttam Singh	Anand Bakshi	Udit Narayan
Gadar: Ek Prem Katha	1875	"Udja Kale Kawan" (victory)	Uttam Singh	Anand Bakshi	Udit Narayan
Hadh	1876	"Kya Hoti Hai"	Viju Shah	Sameer	Kumar Sanu
Hadh	1877	"Tere Dil Ne"	Viju Shah	Sameer	Manhar Udhas
Hindustan	1878	"Khwabon Ki Malika"	Shyam-Surender	Majrooh Sultanpuri	Sonu Nigam
Hum Deewane Pyar Ke	1879	"Paani Tere Hothon Se Tapka"	Anil-Anup	Rani Malik	Kumar Sanu
Hum Deewane Pyar Ke	1880	"Humne Tumko Apna Banaya"	Anil-Anup	Rani Malik	Kumar Sanu
Hum Deewane Pyar Ke	1881	"Sawan Aaya Barsi Ghatayen"	Anil-Anup	Rani Malik	solo
Hum Deewane Pyar Ke	1882	"Pyaar Majboor Hai" (female)	Anil-Anup	Rani Malik	solo
Hum Ho Gaye Aapke	1883	"Hum Ho Gaye Aap Ke"	Nadeem-Shravan	Sameer	Kumar Sanu
Hum Ho Gaye Aapke	1884	"Pehli Baar Dil Youn"	Nadeem-Shravan	Sameer	Kumar Sanu
Hum Ho Gaye Aapke	1885	"Abhi To Mohabbat Ka"	Nadeem-Shravan	Sameer	Udit Narayan
Hum Ho Gaye Aapke	1886	"Der Se Hua (Female)"	Nadeem-Shravan	Sameer	solo
Indian	1887	"Rab Di Kasam"	Anand Raj Anand	Anand Bakshi	Udit Narayan
Indian	1888	"Deewani Main Ho Gayi"	Anand Raj Anand	Anand Bakshi	Shaan
Indian	1889	"Thaath Nawabi"	Anand Raj Anand	Anand Bakshi	Anand Raj Anand
Inteqam	1890	"Dayya Re Dayya"	Jitin Shyam	Suroor Lucknowi	solo
Ittefaq	1891	"Mohabbat Ho Gayi Hai"	Dilip Sen-Sameer Sen	Sameer	Babul Supriyo
Jaan Pe Khelenge Hum	1892	"Kyon Darti Ho"	Vaishnav Dev		Udit Narayan
Jeetenge Hum	1893	"Dekha Tumko To Yeh"	Viju Shah	Deepak Choudhary	Udit Narayan
Jodi No. 1	1894	"Laal Chunariya Wali Pe"	Himesh Reshammiya	Sudhakar Sharma	Sonu Nigam
Jodi No. 1	1895	"Jodi No. 1"	Himesh Reshammiya	Sudhakar Sharma	Sonu Nigam, Kumar Sanu
Kabhi Khushi Kabhie Gham	1896	"Suraj Hua Madhyam"	Sandesh Shnadilya	Anil Pandey	Sonu Nigam
Kabhi Khushi Kabhie Gham	1897	"You Are My Soniya"	Sandesh Shnadilya	Sameer	Sonu Nigam
Kabhi Khushi Kabhie Gham	1898	"Deewana Hai Dekho"	Sandesh Shnadilya	Sameer	Sonu Nigam
Kabhi Khushi Kabhie Gham	1899	"Bole Chudiyan"	Jatin-Lalit	Sameer	Kavita K. Subramaniam, Sonu Nigam, Udit Narayan, Amit Kumar
Kabhi Khushi Kabhie Gham	1900	"Yeh Ladka Hai Allah"	Jatin-Lalit	Sameer	Udit Narayan
Kabhi Khushi Kabhie Gham	1901	"Say Shava Shava"	Aadesh Shrivastava	Sameer	Sunidhi Chauhan, Udit Narayan, Sudesh Bhonsle, Aadesh Shrivastava, Amitabh Bachchan
Kasam	1902	"Chehra Tera Kitaab"	Jatin-Lalit	Indeevar	Udit Narayan
Kasoor	1903	"Kitni Bechain Hoke"	Nadeem-Shravan	Sameer	Udit Narayan
Kasoor	1904	"Zindagi Ban Gaye Ho Tum"	Nadeem-Shravan	Sameer	Udit Narayan
Kasoor	1905	"Dekha Jo Tumko"	Nadeem-Shravan	Sameer	Kumar Sanu
Kasoor	1906	"Kal Raat Ho Gayee"	Nadeem-Shravan	Sameer	Kumar Sanu
Kasoor	1907	"Dil Mera Tod Diya"	Nadeem-Shravan	Sameer	solo
Kuch Khatti Kuch Meethi	1908	"Khud Bhi Nachungi"	Anu Malik	Sameer	solo
Kuch Khatti Kuch Meethi	1909	"Kuch Kuch Khatti"	Anu Malik	Sameer	solo
Kuch Khatti Kuch Meethi	1910	"Neend Udh Rahi Hai"	Anu Malik	Sameer	Kumar Sanu
Kuch Khatti Kuch Meethi	1911	"Saamne Baith Kar"	Anu Malik	Sameer	Kumar Sanu
Kuch Khatti Kuch Meethi	1912	"Tumko Sirf Tumko" (part 1)	Anu Malik	Sameer	Kumar Sanu
Kyo Kii... Main Jhuth Nahin Bolta	1913	"Paa Liya Hain Pyar Tera"	Anand Raj Anand	Dev Kohli	Udit Narayan
Lagaan	1914	"O Re Chori"	A. R. Rahman	Javed Akhtar	Udit Narayan, Vasundhara Das
Lagaan	1915	"Mitwa"	A. R. Rahman	Javed Akhtar	Udit Narayan, Sukhwinder Singh, Srinivas
Lagaan	1916	"Ghanan Ghanan"	A. R. Rahman	Javed Akhtar	Udit Narayan, Shaan, Shankar Mahadevan, Sukhwinder Singh
Lajja	1917	"Badi Mushkil"	Anu Malik	Sameer	solo
Lajja	1918	"Sajan Ke Ghar"	Anu Malik	Sameer	Richa Sharma, Sonu Nigam
Lajja	1919	"Sajan Ke Ghar" (part 2)	Anu Malik	Sameer	Richa Sharma, Sonu Nigam
Little John	1920	"Aaj Meib Gavoon"	Pravin Mani	Javed Akhtar	solo
Meri Adalat	1921	"Palkon Pe Saja Lo Mujhe"	Babul Bose	Rani Malik, Gauhar Kanpuri	Kumar Sanu
Mujhe Kucch Kehna Hai	1922	"Jabse Dekha Hai (Female)"	Anu Malik	Sameer	Babul Supriyo
Mujhe Meri Biwi Se Bachaao	1923	"Zara Thehro"	Rajesh Roshan	Majrooh Sultanpuri	Udit Narayan
Nayak	1924	"Rukhi Sukhi Roti"	A R Rahman	Anand Bakshi	Shankar Mahadevan
Officer	1925	"Kaisa Samaa"	Deepak Choudhary	Deepak Choudhary	Kumar Sanu
One 2 Ka 4	1926	"Sona Nahin Na Sahi"	A. R. Rahman	Majrooh Sultanpuri	Udit Narayan
One 2 Ka 4	1927	"Haye Dil Ka Bazi Laga"	A. R. Rahman	Mehboob	Sonu Nigam
Paagalpan	1928	"Kahin Na Kahin Hai"	Raju Singh	Sameer	Udit Narayan
Paagalpan	1929	"Jhoote The Vaade"	Raju Singh	Sameer	Udit Narayan
Paagalpan	1930	"Dil Hai Deewana"	Raju Singh	Sameer	Udit Narayan
Pyaar Ishq Aur Mohabbat	1931	"Pyaar Ishq Aur Mohabbat"	Viju Shah	Anand Bakshi	Udit Narayan
Pyaar Ishq Aur Mohabbat	1932	"Chand Ho Ya Na Ho"	Viju Shah	Anand Bakshi	Sonu Nigam
Pyaar Tune Kya Kiya	1933	"Pyaar Tune Kya Kiya"	Sandeep Chowta	Nitin Raikwar	Sonu Nigam
Pyar Zindagi Hai	1934	"Sau Rab Di"	Bali Brahmbhatt, Jaideep Choudhary	Sudhendra Mishra	Abhijeet Bhattacharya
Rahul	1935	"Tu Mujhe Kaise Bhool Jaata Hai"	Anu Malik	Anand Bakshi	
Rahul	1936	"Rab Di Kasam"	Anu Malik	Anand Bakshi	solo
Rahul	1937	"Chalti Hai Purvai"	Anu Malik	Anand Bakshi	Mahalaxmi Iyer
Tera Mera Saath Rahen	1938	"Tadapti Hai Tarasti Hai"	Anand Raj Anand	Praveen Bhardwaj	Udit Narayan
Tera Mera Saath Rahen	1939	"Pehli Nazar"	Anand Raj Anand	Sameer	Udit Narayan
Tera Mera Saath Rahen	1940	"Dil Wahi Bekaraar Hota Hai"	Anand Raj Anand	Sameer	Udit Narayan
Tera Mera Saath Rahen	1941	"Tera Mera Saath Rahe"	Anand Raj Anand	Sameer	Udit Narayan
Tera Mera Saath Rahen	1942	"Haathon Ki Lakeeron Mein"	Anand Raj Anand	Sameer	Udit Narayan
Tera Mera Saath Rahen	1943	"Main Sochoon"	Anand Raj Anand	Sameer	Hariharan
Tujhko Pukare Mera Pyar	1944	"Aaja Sunle Zara"	Triveni-Bhavani	Rani Malik	Kumar Sanu
Uljhan	1945	"Shabnam Yeh Tanha"	Aadesh Shrivastava	Shyam Raj	Kumar Sanu
Yaadein	1946	"Chamakti Shaam Hai"	Anu Malik	Anand Bakshi	Sonu Nigam
Yaadein	1947	"Eli Re Eli"	Anu Malik	Anand Bakshi	Kavita Krishnamurthy, Hema Sardesai and Udit Narayan
Yeh Raaste Hain Pyaar Ke	1948	"Bum Bhole"	Sanjeev-Darshan	Anand Bakshi	Vinod Rathod
Yeh Raaste Hain Pyaar Ke	1949	"Halle Halle"	Sanjeev-Darshan	Anand Bakshi	Vinod Rathod
Yeh Raaste Hain Pyaar Ke	1950	"Yeh Dil Mohabbat Mein"	Sanjeev-Darshan	Anand Bakshi	Udit Narayan
Yeh Teraa Ghar Yeh Meraa Ghar	1951	"Hasate Ho Rulate Ho"	Anand–Milind	Ibrahim Ashq	Abhijeet Bhattacharya
Yeh Teraa Ghar Yeh Meraa Ghar	1952	"Govinda"	Anand–Milind	Ibrahim Ashq	Babul Supriyo
Yeh Zindagi Ka Safar	1953	"Dil To Kehta Hai"	Daboo Malik	Salim Bijnori	Solo
Zubeidaa	1954	"Mehndi Hai Rachnewaali"	A R Rahman	Javed Akhtar	solo
Zubeidaa	1955	"Hai Na"	A R Rahman	Javed Akhtar	Udit Narayan

=== 2002 ===
Film	No	Song	Co-artist(s)	Composer(s)	Writer(s)
23rd March 1931: Shaheed	1956	"Jogiya Ve"	Anand Raj Anand	Dev Kohli	solo
Aankhen	1957	"Chalka Chalka"	Jatin-Lalit	Praveen Bhardwaj	Javed Ali
Aankhen	1958	"Kuch Kasmein"	Jatin-Lalit	Praveen Bhardwaj	Sonu Nigam
Aap Mujhe Achche Lagne Lage	1959	"Aap Mujhe Achche Lagne Lage"	Rajesh Roshan	Ibrahim Ashq	Abhijeet Bhattacharya
Aap Mujhe Achche Lagne Lage	1960	"Tum To Sagar Jaisi"	Rajesh Roshan	Dev Kohli	Abhijeet Bhattacharya
Aap Mujhe Achche Lagne Lage	1961	"Meri Jaan"	Rajesh Roshan	Dev Kohli	KK
Aap Mujhe Achche Lagne Lage	1962	"We Wish You A Great Life"	Rajesh Roshan	Dev Kohli	KK, Jack
Ab Ke Baras	1963	"Deewane Aate Jaate"	Anu Malik	Sameer	Sonu Nigam, Kunal Ganjawala
Agni Varsha	1964	"Prem Ki Varsha"	Sandesh Shandilya	Javed Akhtar	solo
Akhiyon Se Goli Maare	1965	"Gore Tan Se Sarakta Jaye"	Sameer	Anand–Milind	Sonu Nigam, Sanjeevani
Akhiyon Se Goli Maare	1966	"Ladki Mud Mud Ke Maare"	Sameer	Anand–Milind	Vinod Rathod
Akhiyon Se Goli Maare	1967	"Maine Tujhe Dekha"	Sameer	Anand–Milind	Sonu Nigam
Akhiyon Se Goli Maare	1968	"Rabba O Rabba"	Sameer	Anand–Milind	Udit Narayan
Ansh: The Deadly Part	1969	"Hum Apni Taraf Se"	Nadeem-Shravan	Sameer	Kumar Sanu
Ansh: The Deadly Part	1970	"Maasum Chehre Ki"	Nadeem-Shravan	Sameer	Sonu Nigam
Awara Paagal Deewana	1971	"Jise Hasna Rona"	Anu Malik	Sameer	Udit Narayan, Sonu Nigam, Shaan, Sunidhi Chauhan, Sarika Kapoor
Badhaai Ho Badhaai	1972	"Raag Banke"	Anu Malik	Javed Akhtar	Shaan
Badhaai Ho Badhaai	1973	"Teri Zindagi Mein Pyaar Hai"	Anu Malik	Javed Akhtar	KK
Badhaai Ho Badhaai	1974	"Teri Zindagi Mein Pyaar Hai" (female)	Anu Malik	Javed Akhtar	solo
Badhaai Ho Badhaai	1975	"Thehro Zara"	Anu Malik	Javed Akhtar	Sonu Nigam
Chalo Ishq Ladaaye	1976	"Chalo Ishq Ladaaye"	Himesh Reshammiya	Sameer	Sonu Nigam
Chalo Ishq Ladaaye	1977	"Masti Masti"	Himesh Reshammiya	Sameer	Sonu Nigam
Chalo Ishq Ladaaye	1978	"Tujhko Hi Dulhan"	Himesh Reshammiya	Sameer	Sonu Nigam
Chalo Ishq Ladaaye	1979	"Aa Pyaar Kare Bindaas"	Himesh Reshammiya	Sameer	Sonu Nigam
Chalo Ishq Ladaaye	1980	"Masti Masti (Remix)"	Himesh Reshammiya	Sameer	Sonu Nigam
Chhal	1981	"Gum Sum"	Viju Shah	Amitabh Verma	Solo
Dil Dhoondhta Hai	1982	"Jise Hasna Rona"	Anu Malik	Tahir Hussain	Shabbir Kumar
Dil Dhoondhta Hai	1983	"Suraj Roz Nikalta Hai"	Anu Malik	Tahir Hussain	Shabbir Kumar
Dil Dhoondhta Hai	1984	"Har Lamha Zindagi Ka"	Anu Malik	Tahir Hussain	Udit Narayan
Dil Dhoondhta Hai	1985	"Dil Dhoondhta Hai"	Anu Malik	Tahir Hussain	solo
Dil Hai Tumhaara	1986	"Dil Laga Liya Maine"	Nadeem-Shravan	Sameer	Udit Narayan
Dil Hai Tumhaara	1987	"Dil Hai Tumhara"	Nadeem-Shravan	Sameer	Kumar Sanu, Udit Narayan
Dil Hai Tumhaara	1988	"Mohabbat Dil Ka Sukoon"	Nadeem-Shravan	Sameer	Kumar Sanu, Udit Narayan
Dil Hai Tumhaara	1989	"Kasam Khake Kaho"	Nadeem-Shravan	Sameer	Kumar Sanu
Dil Hai Tumhaara	1990	"Chaahe Zuban"	Nadeem-Shravan	Sameer	Sonu Nigam
Dil Vil Pyar Vyar	1991	"Tere Bina Zindagi Se"	R. D. Burman, Babloo Chakraborty	Gulzar	Hariharan
Ghaav	1992	"Zindagi Ek Banjaran"	Suresh Raheja	Kumar Parvas	Udit Narayan
Gunaah	1993	"Hamne Tumko Dil Ye De Diya"	Anand Raj Anand	Praveen Bhardwaj	Babul Supriyo
Gunaah	1994	"Jab Dil Churaya"	Anand Raj Anand	Praveen Bhardwaj	Babul Supriyo
Gunaah	1995	"Mere Dil Pe Kisine"	Anand Raj Anand	Praveen Bhardwaj	Sonu Nigam
Gunaah	1996	"Sajna Saajna"	Anand Raj Anand	Praveen Bhardwaj	Abhijeet Bhattacharya
Gunaah	1997	"Humne Tumko Dil" (Film Version)	Sajid-Wajid	Anand Bakshi	Kumar Sanu
Haan Maine Bhi Pyaar Kiya	1998	"Hum Yaar Hain Tumhare"	Nadeem-Shravan	Sameer	Udit Narayan
Haan Maine Bhi Pyaar Kiya	1999	"Har Kisike Dil Mein"	Nadeem-Shravan	Sameer	Udit Narayan
Haan Maine Bhi Pyaar Kiya	2000	"Teri Aankhon Ka Andaaz"	Nadeem-Shravan	Sameer	Udit Narayan
Haan Maine Bhi Pyaar Kiya	2001	"Hum Pyaar Hain Tumhare"	Nadeem-Shravan	Sameer	Kumar Sanu
Haan Maine Bhi Pyaar Kiya	2002	"Zindagi Ko Bina Pyaar (Female)"	Nadeem-Shravan	Sameer	solo
Hathyar	2003	"Chaaha Tha Tumhe"	Anand Raj Anand	Dev Kohli	Sanjay Dutt
Hathyar	2004	"Yeh Dil Deewana Hai"	Anand Raj Anand	Praveen Bhardwaj	Udit Narayan
Hum Kisise Kum Nahin	2005	"Yeh Kya Ho Raha Hai"	Anu Malik	Anand Bakshi	Sonu Nigam
Hum Kisise Kum Nahin	2006	"Dulhe Raja"	Anu Malik	Anand Bakshi	Udit Narayan
Hum Pyaar Tumhi Se Kar Baithe	2007	"Ek Kamre Mein"	Raam Laxman	Dev Kohli	solo
Hum Pyaar Tumhi Se Kar Baithe	2008	"Dil Dena Hai"	Raam Laxman	Shaheen Iqbal	solo
Hum Pyaar Tumhi Se Kar Baithe	2009	"Hum Pyaar Tumhi Se Kar Baithe"	Raam Laxman	Israr Ansari	solo
Hum Pyaar Tumhi Se Kar Baithe	2010	"Hum Pyaar Tumhi Se Kar Baithe" (version 2)	Raam Laxman	Israr Ansari	Saurabh P Shrivastav
Hum Pyaar Tumhi Se Kar Baithe	2011	"Aap Ka Makaan"	Raam Laxman	Israr Ansari	Saurabh P Shrivastav
Hum Pyaar Tumhi Se Kar Baithe	2012	"Raat Ke Baj"	Raam Laxman	Aziz Khan Shahani	Saurabh P Shrivastav
Hum Pyaar Tumhi Se Kar Baithe	2013	"Rang Layi Hai Mohabbat"	Raam Laxman	Suman Sarin	Saurabh P Shrivastav
Humraaz	2014	"Dil Ne Kar Liya"	Himesh Reshammiya	Sudhakar Sharma	Udit Narayan
Humraaz	2015	"Sanam Mere Humraaz"	Himesh Reshammiya	Sudhakar Sharma	Kumar Sanu
Humraaz	2016	Tune Zindagi Mein"	Himesh Reshammiya	Sudhakar Sharma	solo
Humraaz	2017	Tune Zindagi Mein" (sad)	Himesh Reshammiya	Sudhakar Sharma	solo
Jaani Dushman: Ek Anokhi Kahani	2018	"Aaja Aaja"	Anand–Milind	Sameer	Udit Narayan
Jaani Dushman: Ek Anokhi Kahani	2019	"Ishq Junu Hai"	Anand–Milind	Sameer	Sonu Nigam, Prashant Samaddar
Jaani Dushman: Ek Anokhi Kahani	2020	"Zindagi Main Tujhpe" (female)	Anand–Milind	Sameer	solo
Jaani Dushman: Ek Anokhi Kahani	2021	"Zindagi Main Tujhpe" (duet)	Anand–Milind	Sameer	Udit Narayan
Jeena Sirf Merre Liye	2022	"Allah Allah"	Nadeem-Shravan	Sameer	Sonu Nigam
Jeena Sirf Merre Liye	2023	"Jeena Sirf Mere Liye"	Nadeem-Shravan	Sameer	Babul Supriyo, Kavita Krishnamurthy
Jeena Sirf Merre Liye	2024	"Kaash Ke Tujhse Main Kabhi Milta"	Nadeem-Shravan	Sameer	K.K.
Jeena Sirf Merre Liye	2025	"Ek Baar To India"	Nadeem-Shravan	Sameer	solo
Junoon	2026	"Sanson Mein Sawar Jao"	Aadesh Shrivastava	Nida Fazli	solo
Karz	2027	"Shaam Bhi Khoob Hai"	Sanjeev-Darshan	Sameer	Kumar Sanu, Udit Narayan
Kitne Door... kitne Paas	2028	"Jee Jind Jaan Jawani"	Sanjeev-Darshan	Anand Bakshi	Sonu Nigam
Kranti	2029	"Teri Aankhen Bolti Hain"	Jatin-Lalit	Anand Bakshi	Udit Narayan
Kranti	2030	"O Naukar Sarkari"	Jatin-Lalit	Anand Bakshi	Udit Narayan
Kuch Tum Kaho Kuch Hum Kahein	2031	"Hua Salaam Dil Ka"	Anu Malik	Sameer	Udit Narayan
Kuch Tum Kaho Kuch Hum Kahein	2032	"Jab Se Dekha"	Anu Malik	Sameer	Kumar Sanu
Kya Yehi Pyaar Hai	2033	"Dil Ki Nazar Mein" (Female)	Sajid-Wajid	Jalees Sherwani	solo
Kya Yehi Pyaar Hai	2034	"Pehli Pehli Baar Hai"	Sajid-Wajid	Jalees Sherwani	Sonu Nigam
Kya Yehi Pyaar Hai	2035	"Meri Tarah Tum Bhi"	Sajid-Wajid	Jalees Sherwani	Babul Supriyo
Kya Yehi Pyaar Hai	2036	"Tujhe Dekhkar Jeeta"	Sajid-Wajid	Jalees Sherwani	Kumar Sanu, Sonu Nigam
Kyaa Dil Ne Kahaa	2037	"Kya Dil Ne Kaha"	Himesh Reshammiya	Sanjay Chhel	Udit Narayan
Kyaa Dil Ne Kahaa	2038	"Sajana Tere Pyar Mein"	Himesh Reshammiya	Sanjay Chhel	Udit Narayan
Kyaa Dil Ne Kahaa	2039	"Taaza Taaza"	Himesh Reshammiya	Sanjay Chhel	Shaan
Maa Tujhhe Salaam	2040	"Chod Ke Na Ja Oh Piya"	Sajid–Wajid	Sameer	solo
Maine Dil Tujhko Diya	2041	"Aaja Ve Saajan"	Daboo Malik	Salim Bijonori	Sunidhi Chauhan
Maine Dil Tujhko Diya	2042	"Kuch Bhi Nahin"	Daboo Malik	Salim Bijonori	Udit Narayan
Maine Dil Tujhko Diya	2043	Shanana Na"	Daboo Malik	Salim Bijonori	Abhijeet Bhattacharya, Daboo Malik
Maine Dil Tujhko Diya	2044	"Sona Sona"	Daboo Malik	Gufi Paintal	Sonu Nigam
Maine Dil Tujhko Diya	2045	"Thoda Sa Pyaar Hua Hai"	Daboo Malik	Faiz Anwar	Udit Narayan
Maseeha	2046	"Laila Laila"	Anand Raj Anand	Dev Kohli	Abhijeet Bhattacharya
Mere Yaar Ki Shaadi Hai	2047	"Ek Ladki"	Jeet Ganguly and Pritam Chakraborty	Sameer	Udit Narayan
Mere Yaar Ki Shaadi Hai	2048	"Humne Suna Hai"	Jeet Ganguly and Pritam Chakraborty	Sameer	Udit Narayan, Sudesh Bhonsle & Jaspinder Narula
Mere Yaar Ki Shaadi Hai	2049	"Jaage Jaage Armaan Hai"	Jeet Ganguly and Pritam Chakraborty	Sameer	Sonu Nigam, Udit Narayan
Mere Yaar Ki Shaadi Hai	2050	"Mere Yaar Ki Shaadi Hai"	Jeet Ganguly and Pritam Chakraborty	Sameer	Sonu Nigam, Udit Narayan
Mujhse Dosti Karoge!	2051	"Mujhse Dosti Karoge"	Rahul Sharma	Anand Bakshi	Asha Bhosle, Udit Narayan
Mulaqat	2052	"Jaa Le Jaa Mera Dil"	Vishal Bhardwaj	Vinoo Mahendra, Bashir Badr, Shyam	Abhijeet Bhattacharya
Mulaqat	2053	"Tum Mile To Nahin"	Vishal Bhardwaj	Vinoo Mahendra, Bashir Badr, Shyam	solo
Om Jai Jagadish	2054	"Om Jai Jagadish"	Anu Malik	Sameer	Abhijeet, Hariharan, Shaan
Om Jai Jagadish	2055	"Om Jai Jagdish" (part 2)	Anu Malik	Sameer	Abhijeet, Hariharan, Shaan
Om Jai Jagadish	2056	"Chori Chori"	Anu Malik	Sameer	Sonu Nigam, Kunal Ganjawala
Om Jai Jagadish	2057	"Happy Days"	Anu Malik	Sameer	Udit Narayan, Sonu Nigam
Om Jai Jagadish	2058	"Pyar Ka Matlab"	Anu Malik	Sameer	Kavita Krishnamurthy, Udit Narayan, Sonu Nigam
Pyaar Diwana Hota Hai	2059	"Teri Aankhen Bolti Hain"	Uttam Singh	Anand Bakshi	Vinod Rathod
Pyaar Diwana Hota Hai	2060	"Dil Tera Mera"	Uttam Singh	Anand Bakshi	Sonu Nigam
Pyaasa	2061	"Milti Hai Jhukti Hain"	Daboo Malik	Praveen Bhardwaj	Udit Narayan
Pyaasa	2062	"Is Mohabbat Ke Siva"	Sanjeev-Darshan	Faiz Anwar	Sonu Nigam
Qaidi	2063	"Sawan Jo Barse"	Bappi Lahiri	Anwar Sagar	solo
Raaz	2064	"Aapke Pyaar Mein"	Nadeem-Shravan	Sameer	solo
Raaz	2065	"Jo Bhi Kasmein Khayi Thi"	Nadeem-Shravan	Sameer	Udit Narayan
Raaz	2066	"Itna Main Chahoon Tujhe"	Nadeem-Shravan	Sameer	Udit Narayan
Raaz	2067	"Kitna Pyaara Hai Yeh Chehra"	Nadeem-Shravan	Sameer	Udit Narayan
Raaz	2068	"Main Agar Saamne"	Nadeem-Shravan	Sameer	Abhijeet Bhattacharya
Roshni	2069	"Jaanu O Mere Jaanu"	Anand–Milind	Ibrahim Aashq	Kumar Sanu
Roshni	2070	"Zindagi Ke Suhane Safar"	Anand–Milind	Ibrahim Aashq	Kumar Sanu
Roshni	2071	"Maine Tujhe Jaan Liya"	Anand–Milind	Ibrahim Aashq	Udit Narayan
Roshni	2072	"Sajna Harjai"	Anand–Milind	Ibrahim Aashq	Sonu Nigam
Roshni	2073	"Sajna O Mere Sajna"	Anand–Milind	Ibrahim Aashq	Hariharan
Shakti: The Power	2074	"Dil Ne Pukara Hai"	Adnan Sami	Ismail Darbar	Adnan Sami
Shakti: The Power	2075	"Ishq Kameena"	Sonu Nigam	Ismail Darbar	
Shararat	2076	"Ek Ladki Mujhe Chahti Hai"	Sajid-Wajid	Sameer	Sonu Nigam
Soch	2077	"Aa Meri Sanam"	Jatin-Lalit	Sameer	solo
Soch	2078	"Yaadein Bani Parchhaiyan"	Jatin-Lalit	Sameer	Kumar Sanu
Soch	2079	"Yaadein Bani Parchhaiyan" (version 2)	Jatin-Lalit	Sameer	Kumar Sanu
The Legend of Bhagat Singh	2080	"Mahive Mahive"	AR Rahman	Sameer	Udit Narayan
The Legend of Bhagat Singh	2081	"Jogiya Jogiya"	AR Rahman	Sameer	Udit Narayan
Tum Jiyo Hazaron Saal	2082	"Maana Ke Hai Duniya Haseen"	Jatin-Lalit	Gauhar Kanpuri	Abhijeet Bhattacharya
Tumko Na Bhool Paayenge	2083	"Bindiya Chamke Choodi Khanke"	Daboo Malik	Salim Bijnori	Sonu Nigam
Tumko Na Bhool Paayenge	2084	"Kya Hua Tujhe"	Daboo Malik	Salim Bijnori	
Tumko Na Bhool Paayenge	2085	"Kyon Khanke Teri Choodi"	Daboo Malik	Jalees-Rashid	Kamaal Khan
Tumko Na Bhool Paayenge	2086	"Kyon Khanke Teri Choodi" (Club Mix)	Daboo Malik	Jalees-Rashid	Kamaal Khan
Tumse Achcha Kaun Hai	2087	"Aankh Hai Bhari Bhari" (female)	Nadeem-Shravan	Sameer	solo
Waah! Tera Kya Kehna	2088	"Ye Mujhe Kya Hua"	Jatin-Lalit	Sameer	Udit Narayan
Waah! Tera Kya Kehna	2089	"Mujhe Teri Nazar Ne"	Jatin-Lalit	Sameer	Udit Narayan
Yeh Dil Aashiqanaa	2090	"Yeh Dil Aashiqanaa"	Nadeem-Shravan	Sameer	Kumar Sanu
Yeh Dil Aashiqanaa	2091	"I Am In Love"	Nadeem-Shravan	Sameer	Kumar Sanu
Yeh Dil Aashiqanaa	2092	"Allah Allah" (Qawali)	Nadeem-Shravan	Sameer	Sonu Nigam, Tauseef Akhtar, Sabri Bros, Uzair Shah
Yeh Hai Jalwa	2093	"Dheere Dheere"	Himesh Reshammiya	Sudhakar Sharma	Zubeen Garg, Udit Narayan
Yeh Hai Jalwa	2094	"Aankhen Pyari Hain"	Himesh Reshammiya	Sudhakar Sharma	Kumar Sanu
Yeh Hai Jalwa	2095	"Jalwa" (O Jaane Jigar)	Himesh Reshammiya	Sudhakar Sharma	Kumar Sanu
Yeh Hai Jalwa	2096	"Chudi Khankayi Re"	Himesh Reshammiya	Sudhakar Sharma	Udit Narayan
Yeh Kaisi Mohabbat	2097	"Mere Khuda Tu"	Sandeep Chowta	Nitin Raikwar	solo
Yeh Kaisi Mohabbat	2098	"Yeh Kaisi Mohabbat"	Sandeep Chowta	Nitin Raikwar	Kumar Sanu
Yeh Mohabbat Hai	2099	"Bechain Mera Yeh Dil Hai"	Anand Raj Anand	Dev Kohli	Udit Narayan
Yeh Mohabbat Hai	2100	"Chand Saamne Hai"	Anand Raj Anand	Dev Kohli	Sonu Nigam
Zindagi Khoobsoorat Hai	2101	"Yaara Dildara Ve"	Anand Raj Anand	Anand Raj Anand	Gurdas Maan

=== 2003 ===
Film	No	Song	Co-artist(s)	Composer(s)	Writer(s)
Aanch	2102	"Lejron Se Khele"	Sanjeev-Darshan	Afsar	Kumar Sanu
Aapko Pehle Bhi Kahin Dekha Hai	2103	"Baba Ki Rani Hoon"	Nikhil-Vinay	Rajan Raj	solo
Aapko Pehle Bhi Kahin Dekha Hai	2104	"Kabhie Khan Khan"	Nikhil-Vinay	Rajan Raj	Udit Narayan, S. P. Sailaja
Aapko Pehle Bhi Kahin Dekha Hai	2105	"Aapko Pehli Bhi Kahin Dekha Hai"	Nikhil-Vinay	Sameer	Udit Narayan
Aissa Kyon	2106	"Bewafa Pyar Ke"	Raam Laxman	Dev Kohli	Udit Narayan
Aissa Kyon	2107	"Holey Holey Hum Dono"	Raam Laxman	Dev Kohli	Kumar Sanu
Andaaz	2108	"Kisise Tum Pyar Karo"	Nadeem-Shravan	Sameer	Kumar Sanu
Andaaz	2109	"Allah Kare Dil Na Lage Kisise"	Nadeem-Shravan	Sameer	Sonu Nigam
Andaaz	2110	"Rabba Ishq Na Hove"	Nadeem-Shravan	Sameer	Sonu Nigam, Sapna Mukherjee, Kailash Kher
Andaaz	2111	"Aaj Kehna Zaroori Hai"	Nadeem-Shravan	Sameer	Udit Narayan
Andaaz	2112	"Aayega Maza Ab Barsaat Ka"	Nadeem-Shravan	Sameer	Babul Supriyo
Andaaz	2113	"Kitna Pagal Dil Hai" (female)	Nadeem-Shravan	Sameer	solo
Andaaz	2114	"Shala La Baby"	Nadeem-Shravan	Sameer	Shaan
Armaan	2115	"Jaane Yeh Kya Ho Gaya"	Shankar–Ehsaan–Loy	Javed Akhtar	Shankar Mahadevan
Baghban	2116	"Pehle Kabhi Na Mera Haal"	Aadesh Shrivastava	Sameer	Udit Narayan
Baghban	2117	"Main Yahan Tu Wahan"	Aadesh Shrivastava	Sameer	Amitabh Bachchan
Baghban	2118	"Chali Chali Phir"	Aadesh Shrivastava	Sameer	Amitabh Bachchan, Aadesh Shrivastava, Hema Sardesai
Baghban	2119	"Meri Makhna Meri Soniye"	Aadesh Shrivastava	Sameer	Sudesh Bhosle
Baghban	2120	"Hori Khele Raghuveera"	Aadesh Shrivastava	Harivansh Rai Bachchan	Amitabh Bachchan, Sukhwinder Singh, Udit Narayan
Basti	2121	"Chudi Khanake Boli"	Milind Saagar	Anwar Sagar, Sudhakar Sharma	solo
Calcutta Mail	2122	"Meri Jaan Meri Jaana"	Viju Shah	Javed Akhtar, Nitin Raikwar	solo
Calcutta Mail	2123	"Zindagi Hai Kya Pyaar Ke Bina"	Viju Shah	Javed Akhtar, Nitin Raikwar	Udit Narayan
Chalte Chalte	2124	"Tauba Tumhare Ishare"	Jatin-Lalit	Javed Akhtar	Abhijeet Bhattacharya
Chalte Chalte	2125	"Chalte Chalte"	Jatin-Lalit	Javed Akhtar	Abhijeet Bhattacharya
Chalte Chalte	2126	"Dagaria chalo"	Jatin-Lalit	Javed Akhtar	Udit Narayan
Chori Chori	2127	"Aate Aate"	Sajid-Wajid	Anand Bakshi	Babul Supriyo
Chori Chori	2128	"Tu Mere Saamne"	Sajid-Wajid	Anand Bakshi	Udit Narayan
Chori Chori	2129	"Chori Chori"	Sajid-Wajid	Anand Bakshi	solo
Chori Chori	2130	"Kehna Hai"	Sajid-Wajid	Anand Bakshi	Kumar Sanu
Chori Chori	2131	"Mehndi Mehndi"	Sajid-Wajid	Anand Bakshi	solo
Chupke Se	2132	"Jeele Jeele"	Vishal Bhardwaj	Gulzar	KK, Ranjit Barot
Chupke Se	2133	"Kaafi Nahin Jo Bhi Hai"	Vishal Bhardwaj	Gulzar	solo
Chupke Se	2134	"Kai To Ho"	Vishal Bhardwaj	Gulzar	Udit Narayan
Chura Liyaa Hai Tumne	2135	"Chura Liyaa Hai Tumne"	Himesh Reshammiya	Sudhakar Sharma	Shaan
Chura Liyaa Hai Tumne	2136	"Don't You Love Me Baby"	Himesh Reshammiya	Sudhakar Sharma	Shaan
Dhund	2137	"Mehki Mehki Zulfon Mein"	Viju Shah	Ibrahim Aashq	Sonu Nigam
Dhund	2138	"Kitna Intezar"	Viju Shah	solo	
Dil Ka Rishta	2139	"Saajan Saajan"	Nadeem-Shravan	Sameer	Kumar Sanu, Sapna Awasthi
Dil Ka Rishta	2140	"Dil Ka Rishta"	Nadeem-Shravan	Sameer	Kumar Sanu, Udit Narayan
Dil Ka Rishta	2141	"Dayya Dayya Dayya Re"	Nadeem-Shravan	Sameer	solo
Dil Ka Rishta	2142	'Dil Chura Le"	Nadeem-Shravan	Sameer	Kumar Sanu
Dil Ka Rishta	2143	"Haye Dil Mera Dil"	Nadeem-Shravan	Sameer	Kumar Sanu
Dil Pardesi Ho Gaya	2144	"Dil Pardesi Ho Gaya"	Usha Khanna	Sawan Kumar Tak	Sonu Nigam
Dil Pardesi Ho Gaya	2145	"Chham Chham Nachoongi"	Usha Khanna	Sawan Kumar Tak	Udit Narayan
Ek Hindustani	2146	"Chori Chori Dil Diya Tha"	Anand Raj Anand	Anand Bakshi	Udit Narayan
Ek Hindustani	2147	"Mohabbat Ko Hum Chhod Dein"	Anand Raj Anand	Anand Bakshi	Udit Narayan
Ek Hindustani	2148	"Sone Wale Neend Se Jaage"	Anand Raj Anand	Anand Bakshi	Sonu Nigam, Anand Raj Anand
Escape From Taliban	2149	'"Titli Si Ud Chali"	Babul Bose	Mehboob	Sana Aziz
Footpath	2150	"Saari Raat Teri Yaad"	Nadeem-Shravan	Sameer	Udit Narayan
Footpath	2151	"Pal Pal Meri Jaan"	Nadeem-Shravan	Sameer	Udit Narayan
Footpath	2152	"Zara Dekh Mera Deewanapan"	Nadeem-Shravan	Sameer	Udit Narayan
Footpath	2153	"Dil To Milte Hain"	Nadeem-Shravan	Sameer	solo
Footpath	2154	"Kitna Pyara Pyara Hai Sama"	Nadeem-Shravan	Sameer	Abhijeet
Hungama	2155	"Tera Dil"	Nadeem-Shravan	Sameer	Udit Narayan
Hungama	2156	"Hum Nahin"	Nadeem-Shravan	Sameer	Abhijeet Bhattacharya, Sonu Nigam
Indian Babu	2157	"Aap Humse Pyar Karne Lage"	Nadeem-Shravan	Sameer	Kumar Sanu
Indian Babu	2158	"Mere Sang Sang Nach Sajana"	Nadeem-Shravan	Sameer	Kumar Sanu
Indian Babu	2159	"Rabba Rabba"	Nadeem-Shravan	Sameer	Udit Narayan, Kunal Ganjawala
Inteha	2160	"Humsafar Chahiye"	Anu Malik	Rahat Indori	Udit Narayan
Inteha	2161	"Ab Humse Akele"	Anu Malik	Praveen Bhardwaj	Sonu Nigam
Ishq Vishq	2162	"Aankhon Ne Tumhari"	Anu Malik	Sameer	Kumar Sanu
Ishq Vishq	2163	"Ishq Vishk Pyaar Vyaar"	Anu Malik	Sameer	Kumar Sanu
Ishq Vishq	2164	"Aisa Kyun Hota Hai"	Anu Malik	Sameer	solo
Ishq Vishq	2165	"Mujhse Huee Bas Yeh"	Anu Malik	Sameer	solo
Ishq Vishq	2166	"Dooba Re Dooba"	Anu Malik	Sameer	Sonu Nigam
Ishq Vishq	2167	"Theme Piece"	Anu Malik	Sameer	Sonu Nigam
Jaal: The Trap	2168	"Humsafar Ke Liye"	Anand Raj Anand	Sameer	KK
Janasheen	2169	"Pyaar Hone Laga Hai"	Anand Raj Anand	Praveen Bhardwaj	Sonu Nigam
Kaise Kahoon Ke... Pyaar Hai	2170	"Dil Tera Dil"	Viju Shah	Sameer	Udit Narayan
Kal Ho Naa Ho	2171	"Kuch To Hua Hai"	Shankar–Ehsaan–Loy	Javed Akhtar	Shaan
Kal Ho Naa Ho	2172	"Kal Ho Naa Ho" (sad)	Shankar–Ehsaan–Loy	Javed Akhtar	Sonu Nigam, Richa Sharma
Kash... Aap Hamare Hote	2173	"Dhani Chunariya"	Aadesh Shrivastava	Sameer	solo
Kash... Aap Hamare Hote	2174	"Kaash Aap Hamare Hote"	Aadesh Shrivastava	Sameer	Sonu Nigam
Khushi	2175	"Tere Bina"	Anu Malik	Sameer	Shaan
Khushi	2176	"Jiya Maine Jiya"	Anu Malik	Sameer	Udit Narayan
Koi... Mil Gaya	2177	"Idhar Chala Main Udhar Chala"	Rajesh Roshan	Ibrahim Aashq	Udit Narayan
Koi... Mil Gaya	2178	"Haila Haila"	Rajesh Roshan	Dev Kohli	Udit Narayan
Koi... Mil Gaya	2179	"Jadoo Jadoo" (part 1)	Rajesh Roshan	Ibrahim Aashq	Udit Narayan
Koi... Mil Gaya	2180	"Jadoo Jadoo" (part 1)	Rajesh Roshan	Ibrahim Aashq	Adnan Sami
Kucch To Hai	2181	"Kya Pyaar Karoge Mujhse"	Anu Malik	Sameer	Sonu Nigam, Sadhana Sargam
Kucch To Hai	2182	"Kya Pyaar Karoge Mujhse" (female)	Anu Malik	Sameer	solo
Kyon	2183	"Dheere Se Kuch"	Bhupen Hazarika	Prasoon Joshi	solo
LOC Kargil	2184	"Seemaiyen Bulaye"	Anu Malik	Javed Akhtar	solo
Love at Times Square	2185	"Yahaan Pyaar Mein Dhadke Dil"	Rajesh Roshan	Nasir Faraaz	solo
Maa Santoshi Maa	2186	"Maa Banne Ki Do Adhikaar"	Vishwajeet	Abhilash	solo
Market	2187	"Aaj To Madhur Milan Hoga"	Altaf Raja	Arun Bhairav	solo
Market	2188	"Hum Pyar Jo Tera Payenge" (Duet)	Altaf Raja	Arun Bhairav	Kumar Sanu
Mon (Bengali film)	2189	"Prithibi Rangin"	Manash Hazarika	Ibson Lal Baruah	Zubeen Garg, Babul Supriyo, Santa Uzir, Mitu
Mumbai Se Aaya Mera Dost	2189	"Shaher Ka Jadoo Re"	Anu Malik	Sameer	Sonu Nigam
Mumbai Se Aaya Mera Dost	2190	"Mujhe Tune"	Anu Malik	Sameer	Sonu Nigam
Mumbai Se Aaya Mera Dost	2191	"Koi Bheega Hai Rang Se"	Anu Malik	Sameer	Sonu Nigam, Zubeen Garg
Om - The Ultimate Power of Love	2192	"Woh Ladki Meri"	Amar Mohile	Sameer	Kumar Sanu
Om - The Ultimate Power of Love	2193	"Hote Hote"	Amar Mohile	Sameer	Udit Narayan
Om - The Ultimate Power of Love	2194	"Deewani Si Ek Ladki"	Amar Mohile	Sameer	Shaan
Parwana	2195	"Pyaar Mein Hota Hai"	Sanjeev-Darshan	Sameer	Udit Narayan
Pehli Nazar Ka Pehla Pyaar	2196	"Yeh Tera Tewar"	R. P. Patnaik	Sudhakar Sharma	Vinod Rathod
Pehli Nazar Ka Pehla Pyaar	2197	"Lehenge Pe Kurti"	R. P. Patnaik	Sudhakar Sharma	Sonu Nigam
Pehli Nazar Ka Pehla Pyaar	2198	"Pehli Nazar Ka Pehla Pyaar"	R. P. Patnaik	Sudhakar Sharma	solo
Pran Jaye Par Shaan Na Jaaye	2199	"Hum Tere Na Hote"	Nitin Raikwar	Nitin Raikwar	Vinod Rathod
Qayamat: City Under Threat	2200	"Woh Ladki Buhat Yaad Aati Hai"	Nadeem-Shravan	Sameer	Kumar Sanu
Raja Bhaiya	2201	"Janam Janam Jo Saath"	Nadeem-Shravan	Sameer	Udit Narayan
Saaya	2202	"O Saathiya"	M. M. Keeravani	Anand Bakshi	Udit Narayan
Sssshhh...	2203	"Dheere Dheere Hua"	Anu Malik	Praveen Bhardwaj	Adnan Sami
Sssshhh...	2204	"Tera Mera Dil"	Anu Malik	Praveen Bhardwaj	Sonu Nigam
Sssshhh...	2205	"Sapney"	Anu Malik	Yogesh Gaud	Sonu Nigam
Surya	2206	"Halchal Ajab Si"	Aadesh Shrivastava	Sameer	Udit Narayan
Surya	2207	"Ishq Ka Chhalla"	Aadesh Shrivastava	Sameer	Udit Narayan, Sneha Pant
Surya	2208	"Dil Jo Na Keh Saka"	Aadesh Shrivastava	Sameer	Abhijeet Bhattacharya, Kirti Sagathia
Tada	2209	"Nee Mundiya"	Dilip Sen-Sameer Sen	Sameer, Rani Malik	Udit Narayan
Talaash: The Hunt Begins...	2210	"Yaar Badal Na Jaana"	Sanjeev-Darshan	Sameer	Udit Narayan
Talaash: The Hunt Begins...	2211	"Masoom Chehra"	Sanjeev-Darshan	Sameer	solo
Talaash: The Hunt Begins...	2212	"Dil Le Gaya Pardesi"	Sanjeev-Darshan	Sameer	solo
Talaash: The Hunt Begins...	2213	"Zindagi Se Jung"	Sanjeev-Darshan	Sameer	solo
Talaash: The Hunt Begins...	2214	"Baaga Ma Jab Mor Bole"	Sanjeev-Darshan	Sameer	solo
Talaash: The Hunt Begins...	2215	"Tune Dekha Jab Se Haan"	Sanjeev-Darshan	Sameer	Shaan
Tere Naam	2216	"Man Basia O Kanha"	Himesh Reshammiya	Sameer	solo
Tere Naam	2217	"Tere Naam (Female)"	Himesh Reshammiya	Sameer	solo
Tere Naam	2218	"O Jaana"	Himesh Reshammiya	Sameer	Udit Narayan, K.K., Shaan, Kamaal Khan
Tere Naam	2219	"O Jaana" (remix)	Himesh Reshammiya	Sameer	Udit Narayan, K.K., Shaan, Kamaal Khan
Tere Naam	2220	"Odhni"	Himesh Reshammiya	Sameer	Udit Narayan
Tere Naam	2221	"Tere Naam"	Himesh Reshammiya	Sameer	Udit Narayan
Tere Naam	2222	"Tumse Milna"	Himesh Reshammiya	Sameer	Udit Narayan
The Hero	2223	"Dil Main Hai Pyaar"	Uttam Singh	Anand Bakshi	Udit Narayan, Jaspinder Narula
The Hero	2224	"Tere Shehar Ka Kya Hai Naam"	Uttam Singh	Anand Bakshi	Udit Narayan
The Hero	2225	"Dil Main Hai Pyaar" (version 2)	Uttam Singh	Anand Bakshi	Jaspinder Narula
The Hero	2226	"Tu Hai" (version 2)	Uttam Singh	Anand Bakshi	Vital Signs, Sunidhi Chauhan
The Hero	2227	"Tum Bhi Na Mano"	Uttam Singh	Javed Akhtar	Hariharan
Tujhe Meri Kasam	2228	"Thodi Si Deewani"	Viju Shah	Mehboob	solo
Tujhe Meri Kasam	2229	"Choti Choti Khushiyan"	Viju Shah	Mehboob	Abhijeet Bhattacharya, Nisha Upadhyay
Yeh Dil	2230	"Telephone"	Nadeem-Shravan	Sameer	Abhijeet Bhattacharya
Yeh Dil	2231	"Tera Dilbar Tera Saathi"	Nadeem-Shravan	Sameer	Sonu Nigam
Yeh Dil	2232	"Ter Dilbar Tera Saathi" (version 2)	Nadeem-Shravan	Sameer	solo
Zameen	2233	"Bas Ek Baar"	Himesh Reshammiya	Sameer	Babul Supriyo, Himesh Reshammiya
Zinda Dil	2234	"Aage Aage Tum"	Nadeem-Shravan	Sameer	solo
Zinda Dil	2235	"Ikrar Ho Na Jaye (female)"	Nadeem-Shravan	Sameer	solo
Zinda Dil	2236	"Ek Masoom Sa Chehra"	Nadeem-Shravan	Sameer	Udit Narayan

=== 2004 ===
Film	No	Song	Composer(s)	Writer(s)	Co-Artist(s)
Aabra Ka Daabra	2237	"Zindagi Zindagi"	Himesh Reshammiya	Sameer	Kumar Sanu
Aan: Men at Work	2238	"Hum Aapse"	Anu Malik	Sameer	Sonu Nigam
Ab Tumhare Hawale Watan Saathiyo	2239	"Ab Tumhare Hawale Watan Sathiyo"	Anu Malik	Sameer	Kailash Kher, Sonu Nigam, Udit Narayan
Ab Tumhare Hawale Watan Saathiyo	2240	"Chali Aa Chali Aa"	Anu Malik	Sameer	Sonu Nigam
Ab Tumhare Hawale Watan Saathiyo	2241	"Humein Tumse Hua Hai Pyaar"	Anu Malik	Sameer	Udit Narayan
Ab Tumhare Hawale Watan Saathiyo	2242	"Mere Sarpe Dupatta"	Anu Malik	Sameer	Jaspinder Narula, Udit Narayan
Aetbaar	2243	"Aetbaar"	Rajesh Roshan	Dev Kohli	Abhijeet Bhattacharya
Agnipankh	2244	"Khamoshi Ashiqon Ki Hai Zubaan" (version 1)	Pritam Chakraborty	Sandeep Nath, Ravi Basnet	Sonu Nigam
Agnipankh	2245	"Jaane Jaan"	Pritam Chakraborty	Sandeep Nath, Ravi Basnet	Sonu Nigam
Aitraaz	2246	"Aankhen Bandh Karke"	Himesh Reshammiya	Sameer	Udit Narayan
Aitraaz	2247	"Aankhen Bandh Karke"(Remix)	Himesh Reshammiya	Sameer	Udit Narayan
Aitraaz	2248	"Woh Tassavvur"	Himesh Reshammiya	Sameer	Udit Narayan
Aitraaz	2249	"Woh Tassavvur"(Remix)	Himesh Reshammiya	Sameer	Udit Narayan
Aitraaz	2250	"Nazar Aa Raha Hai"	Himesh Reshammiya	Sameer	Udit Narayan
Aitraaz	2251	"Nazar Aa Raha Hai" (Remix)	Himesh Reshammiya	Sameer	Udit Narayan
Aitraaz	2252	"Tala Tum"	Himesh Reshammiya	Sameer	Udit Narayan, Jayesh Gandhi
Aitraaz	2253	"Tala Tum"(Remix)	Himesh Reshammiya	Sameer	Udit Narayan, Jayesh Gandhi
Bardaasht	2254	"Silsile Mulaqaton Ke"	Himesh Reshammiya	Sameer	Udit Narayan
Bardaasht	2255	"Aap Ki Katha Aap Ki"	Himesh Reshammiya	Sameer	Shaan
Bardaasht	2256	"Dil Mera Dil Na Maane"	Himesh Reshammiya	Sameer	solo
Bride and Prejudice	2257	"Lo Aayi Shaadi"	Anu Malik	Javed Akhtar	Anu Malik, Sunidhi Chauhan, Kunal Ganjawala, Gayatri Iyer
Bride and Prejudice	2258	'"Tumse Kahen Ya"	Anu Malik	Javed Akhtar	Udit Narayan
Bride and Prejudice	2259	"Tumse Kahen Ya" (sad)	Anu Malik	Javed Akhtar	solo
Charas	2260	"Sulge Huye Hain"	Raju Singh	Javed Akhtar	Kumar Sanu
Deewaar	2261	"Kaara Kaaga"	Aadesh Shrivastava	Nusrat Badr	solo
Deewaar	2262	"Piya Bawri"	Aadesh Shrivastava	Nusrat Badr	Kailash Kher
Dil Maange More	2263	"Aisa Deewana"	Himesh Reshammiya	Sameer	Sonu Nigam
Dil Ne Jise Apna Kahaa	2264	"Bindiya Chamakne"	Himesh Reshammiya	Sameer	Udit Narayan
Dil Ne Jise Apna Kahaa	2265	"Meri Nas Nas Mein"	Himesh Reshammiya	Sameer	Udit Narayan
Dil Ne Jise Apna Kahaa	2266	"Yeh Dil To Mila Hai"	Himesh Reshammiya	Sameer	Sonu Nigam
Dobara	2267	"Tum Abhi The"(Female)	Anu Malik	Javed Akhtar	solo
Dobara	2268	"Goonja Hua Hai"	Anu Malik	Javed Akhtar	solo
Dobara	2269	"Mujhse Kyun Roothe Ho"	Anu Malik	Javed Akhtar	solo
Dukaan	2270	"Banno Meri Tere Liye"	Altaf Raja	Arun Bhairav	solo
Dukaan	2271	"Banno Meri Tere Liye" (sad)	Altaf Raja	Arun Bhairav	solo
Dukaan	2272	"Dil Tere Naam" (female)	Altaf Raja	Arun Bhairav	solo
Dukaan	2273	"Dil Tere Naam" (duet)	Altaf Raja	Arun Bhairav	Abhijeet Bhattacharya
Ek Se Badhkar Ek	2274	"Dheere Se Jaana"	Anand Raaj Anand	Dev Kohli	Babul Supriyo
Fida	2275	"Aaja Ve Mahi"	Anu Malik	Sameer	Blaaze, Udit Narayan
Fida	2276	"Ek Tu Hai"	Anu Malik	Sameer	Blaaze, Udit Narayan
Fida	2277	"Dil Mere Na Aur"	Anu Malik	Sameer	Udit Narayan
Fida	2278	"Aaj Kaho Sanam"	Anu Malik	Sameer	Kumar Sanu
Hatya	2279	"Yun Hafte"	Nadeem–Shravan	Aftab	Kumar Sanu
Hatya	2280	"Kitna Intezar"	Nadeem–Shravan	Aftab	Kumar Sanu
Hatya	2281	"Khabar Chhap Jayegi"	Nadeem–Shravan	Rani Malik	Kumar Sanu
Hulchul	2282	"Ishq Mein Pyar Mein"	Vidyasagar	Sameer	Shaan
Hum Tum	2283	"Ladki Kyon"	Jatin-Lalit	Prasoon Joshi	Shaan
Hum Tum	2284	"Hum Tum"	Jatin-Lalit	Prasoon Joshi	Babul Supriyo
Hum Tum	2285	"Hum Tum" (Sad Version)	Jatin-Lalit	Prasoon Joshi	solo
Hum Tum	2286	"Gore Gore"	Jatin-Lalit	Prasoon Joshi	solo
Hum Tum	2287	"Yaara Yaara"	Jatin-Lalit	Prasoon Joshi	Udit Narayan
Insaaf	2288	"Chunari Lehrayi Toh"	Nikhil-Vinay	Sameer	Udit Narayan
Ishq Hai Tumse	2289	"Ishq Hai Zindagi"	Himesh Reshammiya	Sameer	Udit Narayan, Vinod Rathod
Ishq Hai Tumse	2290	"O Soniya"	Himesh Reshammiya	Sameer	Udit Narayan
Ishq Hai Tumse	2291	"O Soniya" (remix)	Himesh Reshammiya	Sameer	Udit Narayan
Ishq Hai Tumse	2292	"Dil Dil"	Himesh Reshammiya	Sanjay Chhel	Udit Narayan
Ishq Hai Tumse	2293	"Chaahat Ki Khushboo"	Himesh Reshammiya	Sanjay Chhel	Shaan
Ishq Hai Tumse	2294	"Chura Liya Hai Tumne"	Himesh Reshammiya	Sudhakar Sharma	Shaan
Julie	2295	"Dhadkan Ho Gayee"	Himesh Reshammiya	Sameer	Udit Narayan
Julie	2296	"Aye Dil Bata"	Himesh Reshammiya	Sameer	Sonu Nigam
Julie	2297	"Bheegi Bheegi"	Himesh Reshammiya	Sameer	solo
Kaamakshee	2298	"Mast Samaa Mast Nazare"			Kumar Sanu
Kaun Hai Jo Sapno Mein Aaya	2299	"Dupatta Sarak Raha Hai"	Nikhil-Vinay		Udit Narayan
Kismat	2300	"Hum Hai Mast Maula"	Anand Raj Anand	Dev Kohli	Abhijeet Bhattacharya
Krishna Cottage	2301	"Aaju Mein Tum"	Anu Malik	Sameer	Kumar Sanu
Kuch Kaha Aapne	2302	"Kaise Badhne Lagi"	Sajid-Wajid	Jalees Sherwani, Rashid Lakhnawi	Kumar Sanu
Lakshya	2303	"Agar Main Kahoon"	Shankar–Ehsaan–Loy	Javed Akhtar	Udit Narayan
Madhoshi	2304	"Pyaar Ka Khumar"	Roop Kumar Rathod		solo
Main Hoon Na	2305	"Yeh Fizayein"	Anu Malik		KK
Meenaxi	2306	"Rang Hai"	A R Rahman	Rahat Indori	solo
Meri Biwi Ka Jawaab Nahin	2307	"Hum Sang Kitna"	Laxmikant-Pyarelal		Udit Narayan
Meri Biwi Ka Jawaab Nahin	2308	"Hamra Sajan Sang"	Laxmikant-Pyarelal		solo
Meri Biwi Ka Jawaab Nahin	2309	"Sari Sari"	Laxmikant-Pyarelal		solo
Mission Azaad	2310	"Dekh Sako To"	Mani Sharma	P K Mishra	Sonu Nigam
Mission Azaad		"Yeh Aarzoo"	Mani Sharma	P K Mishra	Sonu Nigam
Mujhse Shaadi Karogi	2311	"Aaja Soniye"	Sajid-Wajid	Jalees Sherwani	Sonu Nigam
Mujhse Shaadi Karogi	2312	"Aaja Soniye" (remix)	Sajid-Wajid	Jalees Sherwani	Sonu Nigam
Mujhse Shaadi Karogi	2313	"Rab Kare"	Sajid-Wajid	Jalees Sherwani	Udit Narayan
Mujhse Shaadi Karogi	2314	"Rab Kare" (version 2)	Sajid-Wajid	Jalees Sherwani	Sonu Nigam, Shabab Sabri
Mujhse Shaadi Karogi	2315	"Laal Dupatta"	Sajid-Wajid	Arun Bhairav	Udit Narayan
Muskaan	2316	"Nami Danam"	Nikhil-Vinay	Sameer	Shaan
Muskaan	2317	"Jaaneman Chupke Chupke"	Nikhil-Vinay	Sameer	Udit Narayan
Police Force: An Inside Story	2318	"Rafta Rafta"	Anand–Milind	Sameer	Sonu Nigam
Police Force: An Inside Story	2319	"Dil Churaya"	Anand–Milind	Sameer	Abhijeet Bhattacharya
Poochho Mere Dil Se	2320	"Pyaar Ke Panchi Hum"	Babul Bose, Tabun Sutradhar	Rani Malik	Udit Narayan
Rakht	2321	"Ishq Bedardi"	Naresh Sharma	Deepak Sneh	Anuradha Paudwal
Rok Sako To Rok Lo	2322	"Haan Mujhe Thaam Le"	Jatin-Lalit	Prasoon Joshi	Babul Supriyo
Rok Sako To Rok Lo	2323	"Jaane Kise"	Jatin-Lalit	Prasoon Joshi	Shaan
Rok Sako To Rok Lo	2324	"Tera Gham"	Jatin-Lalit	Prasoon Joshi	Sonu Nigam
Run	2325	"Chain Ho Chain Ho"	Himesh Reshammiya	Sameer	Sonu Nigam, Jayesh Gandhi
Run	2326	"Dil Mein Jo Baat"	Himesh Reshammiya	Sameer	Sonu Nigam
Run	2327	"Tere Aane Se"	Himesh Reshammiya	Sameer	Kumar Sanu, Alka Yagnik
Run	2328	"Bade Hi Naazuk Daur Se"	Himesh Reshammiya	Sameer	Kumar Sanu, Alka Yagnik
Run	2329	"Tere Aane Se" (Remix)	Himesh Reshammiya	Sameer	solo
Run	2330	"Tere Mere Pyaar Ke Chand"	Himesh Reshammiya	Sameer	solo
Run	2331	"Sarki Chunariya Re Zara Zara"	Himesh Reshammiya	Sameer	Udit Narayan
Satya Bol	2332	"Hosh Ab Kahan"	Aadesh Shrivastava	Javed Akhtar	
Satya Bol	2333	"Jaanu Na Main"	Aadesh Shrivastava	Javed Akhtar	Babul Supriyo
Shart: The Challenge	2334	"Dil Mein Tere Toofan Hai"	Anu Malik	Sameer	Sonu Nigam
Shart: The Challenge	2335	"Hum Pyaar Kar Baithe"	Anu Malik	Sameer	Sonu Nigam
Sheen	2336	"Yeh To Kashmir Hai"	Nadeem-Shravan	Sameer	Udit Narayan
Shikaar	2337	"Jitna Bhi Kar Lo Pyaar"	Anand Raj Anand	Praveen Bhardwaj	Udit Narayan
Shikaar	2338	"Tum Pe Marne Lage Hai"	Anand Raj Anand	Praveen Bhardwaj	Udit Narayan
Shukriya	2339	"Ni Soniye"	Vishal-Shekhar	Sameer	Sonu Nigam, Udit Narayan, Shreya Ghoshal
Shukriya	2340	"Maine Dil Mein Chupaya"	Vishal-Shekhar	Sameer	Udit Narayan
Shukriya	2341	"Kya Haal Hain Mere Is Dil Ka"	Vishal-Shekhar	Sameer	Udit Narayan
Silence Please	2342	"Raat Katne Ko Hai" (female)	Jawahar Wattal	Anmol Saxena	solo
Suno Sasurjee	2343	"Aap Kaha Rehte Hain"	Sanjeev-Darshan	Sameer	Abhijeet
Suno Sasurjee	2344	"Jab Dil Dhadakta"	Sanjeev-Darshan	Sameer	Kumar Sanu
Suno Sasurjee	2345	"Tota Mirchi"	Sanjeev-Darshan	Sameer	Sonu Nigam
Swades	2346	"Saanwariya Saanwariya"	A. R. Rahman	Javed Akhtar	solo
Swades	2347	"Dekho Na"	A. R. Rahman	Javed Akhtar	Udit Narayan
Taarzan: The Wonder Car	2348	"Chura Lo"	Shaan	Himesh Reshammiya	Sameer
Taarzan: The Wonder Car	2349	"Gonna Fall In Love"	Kunal Ganjawala, Jayesh Gandhi	Himesh Reshammiya	Sameer
Taarzan: The Wonder Car	2350	"O Lala Re"	KK	Himesh Reshammiya	Sameer
Taarzan: The Wonder Car	2351	"O Sajan"	Udit Narayan	Himesh Reshammiya	Sameer
Taarzan: The Wonder Car	2352	"Chura Lo Dil Mera"	Udit Narayan	Himesh Reshammiya	Sameer
Taarzan: The Wonder Car	2353	"Dil Se Juda"	Jayesh Gandhi, Kumar Sanu	Himesh Reshammiya	Sameer
Tauba Tauba	2354	"Hai Shararat Ki Nazar"	Jayant Aryan, Vishnuraj	Jayant Aryan, Vishnuraj	solo
Thoda Tum Badlo Thoda Hum	2355	"Thoda Tum Badlo Thoda Hum"	Amar Mohile	Ibrahim Aashq	Udit Narayan
Thoda Tum Badlo Thoda Hum	2356	"Thoda Tum Badlo Thoda Hum" (version 2)	Amar Mohile	Ibrahim Aashq	Udit Narayan
Tum	2357	"Rehna To Hai" (film version)	Himesh Reshammiya	Kumaar	Roop Kumar Rathod
Tum	2358	"Rehna To Hai"	Himesh Reshammiya	Kumaar	Kumar Sanu
Vidyarthi	2359	"Tune Mujhe Aisa"	Anand Raj Anand	Dev Kohli	Sonu Nigam
Woh Tera Naam Tha	2360	"Saajan Ghar Chali Te"	Roop Kumar Rathod	Shahid Hamdani	Richa Sharma
Woh Tera Naam Tha	2361	"Subah Huyi"	Roop Kumar Rathod	Shakil Azmi	solo
Woh Tera Naam Tha	2362	"Kabhi Dil De Kam"	Dilip Sen-Sameer Sen	Nida Fazli	Udit Narayan
Woh Tera Naam Tha	2363	"Yun To Mohabbat Ka"	Sumeet Chopra	Nida Fazli	Udit Narayan
Yeh Lamhe Judaai Ke	2364	"Ram Kasam Dilli Sarkar"	Nikhil-Vinay	S. R. Bharti	Shaan
Yuva	2365	"Baadal Woh Aaye"	A. R. Rahman	Mehboob	Adnan Sami

=== 2005 ===
Film	No	Song	Composer(s)	Writer(s)	Co-artist(s)
Anjaane	2366	"Kis Kadar Chahate Hain"	Himesh Reshammiya	Sameer	Jayesh Gandhi
Anjaane	2367	"Ishq Hai Ishq Hai"	Himesh Reshammiya	Sameer	Udit Narayan
Ankush	2368	"Thoda Kareeb Aa"	Madhu Mani	Deepak	Udit Narayan
Bachke Rehna Re Baba	2369	"Dil Churane Wale"	Anu Malik	Dev Kohli	Kumar Sanu
Bad Boys	2370	"Ek Ladki Sapnon Mein Aayee"	Syed Ahmed	Nitin Raikwar	Babul Supriyo
Barsaat	2371	"Saajan Saajan Saajan"	Nadeem-Shravan	Sameer	Kailash Kher
Barsaat	2372	"Maine Tumse Pyaar Bahut Kiya"	Nadeem-Shravan	Sameer	solo
Barsaat	2373	"Aaja Aaja"	Nadeem-Shravan	Sameer	solo
Barsaat	2374	"Chori Chori"	Nadeem-Shravan	Sameer	Udit Narayan, Sapna Awasthi
Barsaat	2375	"Mushkil"	Nadeem-Shravan	Sameer	Abhijeet
Barsaat	2376	"Pyaar Aaya"	Nadeem-Shravan	Sameer	Sonu Nigam
Barsaat	2377	"Barsaat Ke Din Aaye"	Nadeem-Shravan	Sameer	Kumar Sanu
Bewafaa	2378	"Pyaar Ka Anjaam"	Nadeem-Shravan	Sameer	Sapna Mukherjee, Kumar Sanu
Blackmail	2379	"Jaana Nahin Tha"	Himesh Reshammiya	Sameer	Sonu Nigam
Blackmail	2380	"Akhiyan Ladaa Jaa"	Himesh Reshammiya	Sameer	Udit Narayan
Blackmail	2381	"Akhiyan Ladaa Jaa" (remix)	Himesh Reshammiya	Sameer	Udit Narayan
Chaahat – Ek Nasha	2382	"Yeh Chehra"	Anand Raj Anand	Praveen Bhardwaj	Udit Narayan
Chand Sa Roshan Chehra	2383	"Doli Leke Aaye Hain"	Jatin-Lalit	Sameer	Udit Narayan
Chand Sa Roshan Chehra	2384	"Bechain Mera Dil Hai"	Jatin-Lalit	Sameer	Udit Narayan
Chand Sa Roshan Chehra	2385	"Pehli Nazar Ka Woh Pyar"	Jatin-Lalit	Sameer	Udit Narayan, Sunidhi Chauhan
Chehraa	2386	"Khushbu Khayal Hu"	Anu Malik	Zameer Kazmi	solo
Dosti: Friends Forever	2387	"Dulhania"	Nadeem-Shravan	Sameer	Abhijeet Bhattacharya, Kunal Ganjawala
Dosti: Friends Forever	2388	"Aisa Koi Zindagi Mein"	Nadeem-Shravan	Sameer	Abhijeet Bhattacharya
Dosti: Friends Forever	2389	"Aur Tum Aaye"	Nadeem-Shravan	Sameer	Sonu Nigam
Dosti: Friends Forever	2390	"Yaar Di Shaadi"	Nadeem-Shravan	Sameer	Abhijeet Bhattacharya, Sonu Nigam, Sarika Kapoor
Dus	2391	"Unse Poochhe"	Vishal-Shekhar	Panchhi Jalonvi	Udit Narayan
Elaan	2392	"Bechain Mera Dil"	Anu Malik	Sameer	Udit Narayan
Fun – Can Be Dangerous Sometimes	2393	"Deewangi"	Sanjeev-Darshan	Rakhi Pundit	Udit Narayan
Hum Tum Aur Mom	2394	"Bikhri Zulfein"	K P	Srinivas Baba, Raus Warsi	Udit Narayan
Hum Tum Aur Mom	2395	"Jaan-E-Chaman"	K P	Srinivas Baba, Raus Warsi	Saurabh P. Srinivasan
Insan	2396	"Chunri"	Himesh Reshammiya	Sameer	Udit Narayan
Insan	2397	"Rabba Mere Rabba"	Himesh Reshammiya	Sameer	Udit Narayan
Insan	2398	"Rabba Mere Rabba" (sad)	Himesh Reshammiya	Sameer	solo
Insan	2399	"Khwahish"	Himesh Reshammiya	Sameer	Sonu Nigam
Jalwa	2400	"Bahon Mein Aaja"	Dilip Sen	Sabbir Ahmed, Asad Ajmeri	Kumar Sanu
Jalwa	2401	"Jadoo Kiya Kya"	Dilip Sen	Sabbir Ahmed, Asad Ajmeri	solo
Jo Bole So Nihaal	2402	"Rab Jaane"	Anand Raj Anand	Dev Kohli	Kamaal Khan
Jo Bole So Nihaal	2403	"Rab Jaane" (version 2)	Anand Raj Anand	Dev Kohli	Kamaal Khan, Sukhwinder Singh
Jurm	2404	"Meri Chahato Ka Samudar"	Anu Malik	Rahat Indori	Abhijeet|
Khullam Khulla Pyaar Karen	2405	"Bachalo Bachalo"	Anand–Milind	Sameer	Sonu Nigam
Khullam Khulla Pyaar Karen	2406	"Mere Nazar Se Katari"	Anand–Milind	Sameer	Sonu Nigam
Kisna: The Warrior Poet	2407	"Tu Itni Pagli Kyun Hai"	Ismail Darbar	Javed Akhtar	Udit Narayan, Ismail Darbar
Kisna: The Warrior Poet	2408	"Chilman Uthegi Nahin"	Ismail Darbar	Javed Akhtar	Alka Yagnik, Hariharan
Kisna: The Warrior Poet	2409	"Wohi Din Aa Gaya"	Ismail Darbar	Javed Akhtar	Sukhwinder Singh
Kisna: The Warrior Poet	2410	"Aham Brahmasmi"	Ismail Darbar	Javed Akhtar	Sukhwinder Singh
Koi Aap Sa	2411	"Seene Mein Dil"	Himesh Reshammiya	Sameer	Udit Narayan
Koi Aap Sa	2412	"Kabhi Na Sukoon Aaya"	Himesh Reshammiya	Sameer	Udit Narayan
Koi Aap Sa	2413	"Kabhi Na Sukoon Aaya" (Sad)	Himesh Reshammiya	Sameer	Udit Narayan
Koi Aap Sa	2414	"Koi Aap Sa"	Himesh Reshammiya	Sameer	Sonu Nigam
Koi Aap Sa	2415	"Seene Mein Dil" (Female)	Himesh Reshammiya	Sameer	solo
Kuchh Meetha Ho Jaye	2416	"Lagne Lage Ho Tum Kitne Pyare"	Himesh Reshammiya	Sameer	Sonu Nigam
Kyon Ki	2417	"Aa Jee Le Ik Pal Mein Sanam"	Himesh Reshammiya	Sameer	Udit Narayan
Kyon Ki	2418	"Dil Ke Badle"	Himesh Reshammiya	Sameer	Udit Narayan
Kyon Ki	2419	"Kyon Ki Itna Pyaar" (version 1)	Himesh Reshammiya	Sameer	Udit Narayan
Kyon Ki	2420	"Kyon Ki Itna Pyaar" (version 3)	Himesh Reshammiya	Sameer	Udit Narayan
Kyon Ki	2421	"Kyon Ki Itna Pyaar" (solo)	Himesh Reshammiya	Sameer	solo
Lucky: No Time for Love	2422	"Chori Chori"	Adnan Sami	Sameer	Sonu Nigam
Lucky: No Time for Love	2423	"Chori Chori" (remix)	Adnan Sami	Sameer	Sonu Nigam
Mahiya	2424	"Do Pal Ki Zindagi"	J. Subhash, Shekhar Sharma	Vinay Bihari	Udit Narayan
Main Aisa Hi Hoon	2425	"Deewanapan Deewangi"	Himesh Reshammiya	Sameer	Udit Narayan
Maine Pyaar Kyun Kiya?	2426	"Ishq Chunariya"	Himesh Reshammiya	Sameer	Udit Narayan
Maine Pyaar Kyun Kiya?	2427	"Laga Prem Rog"	Himesh Reshammiya	Sameer	Kamaal Khan
Maine Pyaar Kyun Kiya?	2428	"Laga Prem Rog" (remix)	Himesh Reshammiya	Sameer	Kamaal Khan
Maine Pyaar Kyun Kiya?	2429	"Sajan Tumse Pyar"	Himesh Reshammiya	Sameer	Udit Narayan
Maine Pyaar Kyun Kiya?	2430	"Sajan Tumse Pyar" (version 2)	Himesh Reshammiya	Sameer	Sonu Nigam
Mashooka	2431	"Aapse Mohabbat Ho Gayi"	Sajid-Wajid	Jalees Sherwani	Abhijeet Bhattacharya
Mashooka	2432	"Bechainiyan Ab Satane Lagi"	Sajid-Wajid	Jalees Sherwani	Babul Supriyo
Mohabbat Ho Gayi Hai Tumse	2433	"Saiyan Sanye Sanyoni"	Sanjeev-Darshan	Sameer	solo
Mohabbat Ho Gayi Hai Tumse	2434	"Sona Sona Mukhda"	Sanjeev-Darshan	Sameer	Javed Ali
Mohabbat Ho Gayi Hai Tumse	2435	"Bahon Mein Aaja"	Sanjeev-Darshan	Sameer	Kumar Sanu
Mohabbat Ho Gayi Hai Tumse	2436	"Kaise Kahoon Ke Tum Mere Kya Ho"	Sanjeev-Darshan	Sameer	Kumar Sanu
Nigehbaan	2437	"Vaada Yeh Tera Vaada"	Himesh Reshammiya	Sameer	solo
No Entry	2438	"Dil Paagal Hai"	Anu Malik	Sameer	Kumar Sanu, KK
Pyaar Mein Twist	2439	"Pal Tham Gaya Hai"	Jatin-Lalit	Sameer	Abhijeet
Pyaar Mein Twist	2440	"Pal Tham Gaya Hai" (remix)	Jatin-Lalit	Sameer	Abhijeet
Rain	2441	"Ye Dard Bada Bedardi"	Satish Ajay	Praveen Bhardwaj	Solo
Sanam Hum Aapke Hai	2442	"Hum Aapke Hai"	Manoj-Vijay	Murari, Saket	Udit Narayan
Sanam Hum Aapke Hai	2443	"Tum Chaho Ya Na Chaho"	Manoj-Vijay	Murari, Saket	Udit Narayan
Sehar	2444	"Sapnon Ka Sehar Ho"	Daniel B George	Nilanjana Kishore, Swanand Kirkire	solo
Sehar	2445	"Palken Jhukao Na" (force)	Daniel B George	Nilanjana Kishore, Swanand Kirkire	Adnan Sami
Sehar	2446	"Palken Jhukao Na" (sacrifice)	Daniel B George	Nilanjana Kishore, Swanand Kirkire	Adnan Sami
Shabnam Mausi	2447	"Thoda Thehar"	Mani Shankar	Sujit Chaubey	Udit Narayan
Sheesha	2448	"Main Ho Gayee Atharah Baras Ki"	Dilip Sen-Sameer Sen	Dev Kohli	Shehzad
Shikhar	2449	"Mere Mann"	Viju Shah	Manohar Iyer	Udit Narayan
Shikhar	2450	"Aaj Khushi Naach Uthi"	Viju Shah	Manohar Iyer	Udit Narayan
Silsiilay	2451	"Ban Jaiye"	Himesh Reshammiya	Sameer	Kunal Ganjawala
Sitam	2452	"Aa Jao Aa Bhi Jao"	Nikhil-Vinay	Kamal Rashid Khan	solo
Ssukh	2453	"Suno Raton Mein Kya"	Kamini Khanna, Nirmal Pawar	Prashant Vasl	Udit Narayan
Tango Charlie	2454	"Kya Bataun Dilruba"	Anu Malik	Javed Akhtar	Udit Narayan
Tujhko Pukaare	2455	"O Mere Pardesi"	Gyaneshwar Dubey	Abhiraaj	solo
Vaada	2456	"Main Ishq Uska"	Himesh Reshammiya		Babul Supriyo
Vaada	2457	"Vaada Hai Yeh "	Himesh Reshammiya		Udit Narayan, Kumar Sanu
Vaada	2458	"Main Deewana"	Himesh Reshammiya		Udit Narayan
Vaah! Life Ho To Aisi	2459	"Dil Ke Maare"	Himesh Reshammiya	Sameer	Udit Narayan
Waqt: The Race Against Time	2460	"Subah Hogee"	Anu Malik	Sameer	Udit Narayan
Yakeen	2461	"Tune Mujhko"	Himesh Reshammiya	Sameer	Udit Narayan
Yakeen	2462	"Meri Aankhon Mein"	Himesh Reshammiya	Sameer	Udit Narayan
Yakeen	2463	"Chehra Tera"	Himesh Reshammiya	Sameer	Sonu Nigam
Yehi Hai Zindagi	2464	"Rutu Nakshatra Ke Gahane"	Arvind Haldipur	Sanjay Churmure	solo
Zameer: The Fire Within	2465	"Pardesi Pardesi"	Jatin-Lalit	Sameer	Kumar Sanu, Sapna Awasthi
Zameer: The Fire Within	2466	"Tere Pyaar Ne Deewana"	Jatin-Lalit	Sameer	Babul Supriyo

=== 2006 ===
Film	No	Song	Composer(s)	Writer(s)	Co-artist(s)
36 China Town	2467	"Dil Tumhare Bina"	Himesh Reshammiya	Sameer	Himesh Reshammiya
36 China Town	2468	"Dil Tumhare Bina" (remix)	Himesh Reshammiya	Sameer	Himesh Reshammiya
36 China Town	2469	"Jab Kabhi"	Himesh Reshammiya	Sameer	Kunal Ganjawala
36 China Town	2470	"Jab Kabhi" (remix)	Himesh Reshammiya	Sameer	Kunal Ganjawala
36 China Town	2471	"Jab Kabhi" (Suketu remix)	Himesh Reshammiya	Sameer	Kunal Ganjawala
Aisa Kyon Hota Hai?	2472	"Tere Bachpan Ki Lori"	Tauseef Akhtar	Sayeed Quadri	solo
Baabul	2473	"Gaa Re Mann"	Aadesh Shrivastava	Sameer	Sudesh Bhonsle, Kavita Krishnamurthy, Kailash Kher, Amitabh Bachchan
Banaras	2474	"Kitna Pyar Kartein Hain" (female)	Himesh Reshammiya	Sameer	solo
Chand Ke Paar Chalo	2475	"Chand Ke Paar Chalo"	Vishnu Narayan	Rishi Azad	Udit Narayan
Chand Ke Paar Chalo	2476	"Chand Ke Paar Chalo" (version 2)	Vishnu Narayan	Rishi Azad	Udit Narayan
Chand Ke Paar Chalo	2477	"Chand Ke Paar Chalo" (sad)	Vishnu Narayan	Rishi Azad	Udit Narayan
Ei8ht Shani	2478	"Tumse Shikaayat"	Daboo Malik	Praveen Bhardwaj	solo
Hota Hai Dil Pyaar Mein Paagal	2479	"Dil Chalne Laga"	Ali-Vasudev	Ali	Kunal Ganjawala
Hota Hai Dil Pyaar Mein Paagal	2480	"Hota Hai Dil Pyaar Mein Paagal"	Ali-Vasudev	Ali	Udit Narayan
Humko Deewana Kar Gaye	2481	"Dekhte Dekhte"	Anu Malik	Sameer	Abhijeet Bhattacharya
Humko Tumse Pyaar Hai	2482	"Humko Tumse Pyaar Hai"	Anand Raj Anand	Dev Kohli	Kumar Sanu
Humko Tumse Pyaar Hai	2483	"Humko Tumse Pyaar Hai" (sad)	Anand Raj Anand	Dev Kohli	Anand Raj Anand
Humko Tumse Pyaar Hai	2484	"Tere Ishq Mein Pagal"	Anand Raj Anand	Dev Kohli	Udit Narayan, Sapna Awasthi
Humko Tumse Pyaar Hai	2485	"Bajne Lage Hain"	Anand Raj Anand	Dev Kohli	Udit Narayan
Humko Tumse Pyaar Hai	2486	"Kaise Tumhe"	Anand Raj Anand	Dev Kohli	Udit Narayan
Humko Tumse Pyaar Hai	2487	"Ye Mehandi Ke Boote"	Anand Raj Anand	Dev Kohli	Udit Narayan, Babul Supriyo
Husn: Love & Betrayel	2488	"Teri Aankhon Se"	Ismail Darbar	Nida Fazli	Kunal Ganjawala
Jai Santoshi Maa	2489	"Suno Suno Kaho Kaho"	Anu Malik	Swanand Kirkire	Sonu Nigam
Jai Santoshi Maa	2490	"Maa Santoshi Maa"	Anu Malik	Swanand Kirkire	Sonu Nigam
Jai Santoshi Maa	2491	"Bigdi Bana Do" (with Shlok)	Anu Malik	Swanand Kirkire	solo
Kabhi Alvida Naa Kehna	2492	"Kabhi Alvida Naa Kehna"	Shankar–Ehsaan–Loy	Javed Akhtar	Sonu Nigam
Kabhi Alvida Naa Kehna	2493	"Kabhi Alvida Naa Kehna - Sad Version"	Shankar–Ehsaan–Loy	Javed Akhtar	Sonu Nigam
Kabhi Alvida Naa Kehna	2494	"Tumhi Dekho Naa"	Shankar–Ehsaan–Loy	Javed Akhtar	Sonu Nigam
Krrish	2495	"Main Hoon Woh Aasmaan"	Rajesh Roshan	Nasir Faraaz	Rafaqat Ali Khan
Krrish	2496	"Mystic Love Mix"	Rajesh Roshan	Nasir Faraaz	Rafaqat Ali Khan
Love Ke Chakkar Mein	2497	"Suno Na"	Daboo Malik	Praveen Bhardwaj	Shaan
Manoranjan	2498	"Saans Chalti Rahe To"	Nayab-Raja	Zaheer Anwar	Kumar Sanu
Mera Dil Leke Dekho	2499	"Mera Dil Leke Dekho"	Jatin-Lalit	Sameer	Abhijeet Bhattacharya
Mere Jeevan Saathi	2500	"Har Taraf Apni Tasveer"	Nadeem-Shravan	Sameer	solo
Mere Jeevan Saathi	2501	"Tum Bin Na Hum Jee Sakenge"	Nadeem-Shravan	Sameer	Udit Narayan
Rehguzar	2502	"Meri Bechainiyaan"	Aadesh Shrivastava	Nusrat Badr	Shaan
Sandwich	2503	"Gabbroo"	Aadesh Shrivastava	Dev Kohli	Hema Sardesai
Sarhad Paar	2504	"Sona Chandi Kya Karenge"	Anand Raj Anand	Dev Kohli	Udit Narayan
Sarhad Paar	2505	"Sona Chandi Kya Karenge" (version 2)	Anand Raj Anand	Dev Kohli	Udit Narayan
Shaadi Karke Phas Gaya Yaar	2506	"Deewane Dil Ko Jaane Na"	Sajid–Wajid	Shabbir Ahmed	Sonu Nigam, Sunidhi Chauhan
Shaadi Karke Phas Gaya Yaar	2507	"Kuch Bhi Nahi Tha"	Sajid–Wajid	Jalees Sherwani	Hariharan
Shaadi Karke Phas Gaya Yaar	2508	"Taaron Ko Mohabbat Amber Se"	Daboo Malik	Jalees Sherwani, Rashid Lucknowi	Udit Narayan
Shaadi Se Pehle	2509	"Bijuriya"	Himesh Reshammiya	Sameer	Sukhwinder Singh
Shaadi Se Pehle	2510	"Bijuriya" (remix)	Himesh Reshammiya	Sameer	Sukhwinder Singh
Shaadi Se Pehle	2511	"Sache Aashiq"	Himesh Reshammiya	Sameer	Sukhwinder Singh
Shaadi Se Pehle	2512	"Tere Liye"	Himesh Reshammiya	Sameer	Udit Narayan
Shaadi Se Pehle	2513	"Tere Liye" (remix)	Himesh Reshammiya	Sameer	Udit Narayan
Souten: The Other Woman	2514	"Mohabbat Ho Chuke Hai"	Anand–Milind	Praveen Bhardwaj	Sonu Nigam
Souten: The Other Woman	2515	"Barsaat Hai"	Anand–Milind	Praveen Bhardwaj	Udit Narayan
Umrao Jaan	2516	"Bekha Diya Hamein"	Anu Malik	Javed Akhtar	Sonu Nigam
Umrao Jaan	2517	"Ek Toote Huye Dil Ki"	Anu Malik	Javed Akhtar	solo
Umrao Jaan	2518	"Jhute Ilzaam"	Anu Malik	Javed Akhtar	solo
Umrao Jaan	2519	"Main Na Mil Saku Jo Tumse"	Anu Malik	Javed Akhtar	solo
Umrao Jaan	2520	"Pehle Pehel"	Anu Malik	Javed Akhtar	solo
Umrao Jaan	2521	"Pooch Rahe Hain"	Anu Malik	Javed Akhtar	solo
Umrao Jaan	2522	"Salaam"	Anu Malik	Javed Akhtar	solo
Unns... Means Love	2523	"Hum Hai Bechain"	Sujeet Shetty	Shaheen Iqbal	Udit Narayan
Unns... Means Love	2524	"Rang Mein Tere"	Sujeet Shetty	Shaheen Iqbal	solo
Utthaan	2525	"Haan Ab Neend Kise"	Kumar Sanu	Sudhakar Sharma	Kumar Sanu
Utthaan	2526	"Haan Ab Neend Kise" (remix)	Kumar Sanu	Sudhakar Sharma	Kumar Sanu
Yatra	2527	"Aap To Mere Hi Khwabon Mein"	Khayyam	Ahmed Wasi	Udit Narayan

=== 2007 ===
Film	No	Song	Composer(s)	Writer(s)	Co-artist(s)
Aur Pappu Pass Ho Gaya	2528	"Jaane Jaana"	Ravi Chopra	Ravi Chopra	Kunal Ganjawala
Big Brother	2529	"Jeevan Tumne Diya Hai"	Anand Raj Anand		Roop Kumar Rathod, Sadhana Sargam, Udit Narayan
Familywala	2530	"O Soniya Mere"	Uttank Vinayak Vora	Nusrat Badr	Udit Narayan
Familywala	2531	"Kehti Hai Kya Yeh Hawa"	Uttank Vinayak Vora	Nusrat Badr	Shaan
Fear	2532	"Dil Ki Daro Deewaar Pe"	Himesh Reshammiya	Sameer	Udit Narayan
Fear	2533	"Tu Hai Ishq"	Himesh Reshammiya	Sameer	Udit Narayan
Ghutan	2534	"Jeete Jee Kabr Mein"	Raghunath Dixit	Ibrahim Aashq, J. P. Chandel	solo
Good Boy, Bad Boy	2535	"Aashiqana Aalam Hai"	Himesh Reshammiya	Sameer	Himesh Reshammiya, Sunidhi Chauhan, Vinit Singh
Guru	2536	"Aye Hairate Aashiqi"	A.R. Rahman	Gulzar	Hariharan
Life Mein Kabhie Kabhiee	2537	"Hum Khushi Ki Chah Mein (Rock Mix)"	Lalit Pandit	Sameer	Zubeen
Manthan	2538	"Bas Itna Karam"	Prakash-Ashish-Veeru	Tanveer Ghazi	Kailash Kher
Manthan	2539	"Hawa Ki Chadar"	Prakash-Ashish-Veeru	Tanveer Ghazi	solo
Marigold	2540	"Paagal Si Saari Leheren"	Shankar–Ehsaan–Loy	Javed Akhtar	Vikas Bhalla
Marigold	2541	"Tan Man"	Shankar–Ehsaan–Loy	Javed Akhtar	Vikas Bhalla, Sneha Pant, Nihira Joshi
Miss Anara	2542	"Tumko Pakar Jaane Jaana"	Mani Shankar	Dilip Tahir	solo
Miss Anara	2543	"Come On Friends"	Mani Shankar	Dilip Tahir	solo
Parveen Bobby	2544	"Hello Suno To Zara"	Dilip Sen-Sameer Sen	Sunil Jha	Kunal Ganjawala
Saawariya	2545	"Chhabeela"	Monty Sharma	Sameer	solo
Undertrial	2546	"Lo Gaya Kaam Se"	Anu Malik, Shamir Tandon	Sameer, Dev Kohli Sandeep Nath	Sonu Nigam

=== 2008 ===
Film	No	Song	Composer(s)	Writer(s)	Co-artist(s)
Aaj Ka Boss	2547	"Tere Bina Naiyo Jeena"	Ghulam Ali	Nawab Arzoo, Navdeep Bikaneri	Udit Narayan
Aaj Ka Neta	2548	"Hum Aur Tum Aur Yeh Sama" (female)	Abir Mukherjee	Bhisham Kohli	solo
Aaj Ka Neta	2549	"Soya Hai Tu"	Abir Mukherjee	Bhisham Kohli	solo
God Tussi Great Ho	2550	"Lal Chunariya"	Sajid–Wajid	Deven Shukla	Udit Narayan
Gumnaam – The Mystery	2551	"Na Hone Denge"	Nadeem-Shravan	Sameer	Kumar Sanu
Gumnaam – The Mystery	2552	"Na Hone Denge" (club mix)	Nadeem-Shravan	Sameer	Kumar Sanu
Gumnaam – The Mystery	2553	"Dhoke Mein"	Nadeem-Shravan	Sameer	Abhijeet Bhattacharya, Sarika Kapoor
Haseena	2554	"Sajan Mera Mehndi Laya"	Rajan Bawa	Rajan Bawa	Sapna Awasthi
Haseena	2555	"Khuda Jaanta Hai"	Rajan Bawa	Rajan Bawa	Udit Narayan
Kismat Konnection	2556	"Bakhuda Tumhi Ho"	Pritam	Sayeed Quadri	Atif Aslam
Kismat Konnection	2557	"Bakhuda Tumhi Ho" (remix)	Pritam	Sayeed Quadri	Atif Aslam
Love Story 2050	2558	"Mausam Achanak"	Anu Malik	Javed Akthar	Shaan
Love Story 2050	2559	"Meelon Ka Jaisa Tha Fasla"	Anu Malik	Javed Akthar	KK
Love Story 2050	2560	"Milon Ka Jaise Tha Faasla" (sad)	Anu Malik	Javed Akthar	KK
Mehbooba	2561	"Babuji"	Ismail Darbar	Anand Bakshi	Sanjay Dutt, Ajay Devgn
Mehbooba	2562	"Yaar Tera Shukriya"	Ismail Darbar	Anand Bakshi	Udit Narayan
Memsaab	2563	"Pata Dhadkanon Se"	Murlidhar Alia	Ibrahim Aashq	Udit Narayan
Mere Baap Pehle Aap	2564	"Jaana Hai Tujhko"	Vidyasagar	Sameer	Shaan
Mr. Black Mr. White	2565	"Ek Dil Ki"	Jatin-Lalit	Sameer	Shaan, Udit Narayan
Shrameya	2566	"Yeh Khuli Vadiyan"	Rajiv-Mona	Vandana Rane	Udit Narayan
Slumdog Millionaire	2567	"Ringa Ringa"	A.R. Rahman	Raqueeb Alam	Ila Arun
Yuvvraaj	2568	"Tu Muskura"	A.R. Rahman	Gulzar	Javed Ali
Yuvvraaj	2569	"Mastam Mastam"	A.R. Rahman	Gulzar	Sonu Nigam, Benny Dayal, Naresh Iyer

=== 2009 ===
Film	No	Song	Composer(s)	Writer(s)	Co-artist(s)
Mere Khwabon Mein Jo Aaye	2570	"Sehmi Sehmi"	Lalit Pandit	Javed Akhtar	Shaan, Runa Rizvi, Clinton Cerejo, Lalit Pandit
Mere Khwabon Mein Jo Aaye	2571	"Sehmi Sehmi" (remix)	Lalit Pandit	Javed Akhtar	Shaan, Runa Rizvi, Clinton Cerejo, Lalit Pandit
Mohandas	2572	"Nadi Mein Yeh Chanda"	Vivek Priyadarshan	Yash Malviya	Shaan
Sanam Teri Kasam	2573	"Itna Bhi Na Chaho Mujhe"	Nadeem-Shravan	Sameer	Kumar Sanu
Sanam Teri Kasam	2574	"Main Pyaar Tumse"	Nadeem-Shravan	Sameer	Kumar Sanu
Short Kut: The Con is On	2575	"Kal Nau Bhaje"	Shankar–Ehsaan–Loy	Javed Akhtar	Sonu Nigam
The Hero - Abhimanyu	2576	"Maine Li Jo Angdaai"	Gurudutt Sahil	Sudhakar Sharma	solo
What's Your Raashee?	2577	"Pyaari Pyaari"	Sohail Sen	Javed Akthar	Sohail Sen

== 2010s ==
=== 2010 ===
Film	No	Song	Composer(s)	Writer(s)	Co-artist(s)
Ada... A Way of Life	2578	"Hawa Sun Hawa"	A. R. Rahman	Nusrat Badr	Sonu Nigam
Ada... A Way of Life	2579	"Gum Sum"	A. R. Rahman	Nusrat Badr	Sonu Nigam
Ada... A Way of Life	2580	"Milo Wahan Wahan"	A. R. Rahman	Nusrat Badr	Jayachandran
Ek Hi Rasta (D)	2581	"Mahamari Gazab Bhayo Rama"	Mani Sharma	Anwar Sagar	Udit Narayan
Ek Second... Jo Zindagi Badal De?	2582	"Kyon Maang Yeh Khali Hai"	Anand Raj Anand		Shaan
Milenge Milenge	2583	"Yeh Hare Kaanch Ki Choodiyan"	Himesh Reshammiya	Sameer	solo
Milenge Milenge	2584	"Milenge Milenge"	Himesh Reshammiya	Sameer	Jayesh Gandhi
Milenge Milenge	2585	"Tum Chain Ho"	Himesh Reshammiya	Sameer	Sonu Nigam, Suzanne D'Mello
Milenge Milenge	2586	"Tum Chain Ho" (Lounge Mix)	Himesh Reshammiya	Sameer	Sonu Nigam, Suzanne D'Mello
Trump Card	2587	"Tumhare Liye"	Lalit Sen	Nawab Arzoo	Kunal Ganjawala

=== 2011 ===
Film	No	Song	Composer(s)	Writer(s)	Co-artist(s)
Aishwarya	2588	"Kaise Batlao Tujhe"	Vishnu Narayan	Atique Allahabadi	Vijay Prakash
Kya Yahi Sach Hai	2589	"Udakae Mujhko Ye Hawaein"	Nirmal Augutraya	Nirmal Augustaya	solo
Shivam	2590	"Kyun Ye Nazrein Hain Gumsum"	Ramen Barua		solo
Shivam	2591	"Khoye Se Hum Khoye Se Tum"	Ramen Barua		Udit Narayan
My Husband's Wife	2592	"Jitna Bana Sakho Deewana"	Dinesh Arjuna		Babul Supriyo

=== 2012 ===
Film	No	Song	Composer(s)	Writer(s)	Co-artist(s)
Its Rocking- Dard-E-Disco	2593	"Mohabbath"	Bappi Lahiri	Virag Mishra	Zubeen Garg
Rang	2594	"Hawa Ne Yeh Paigam"	Nadeem-Shravan	Sameer	solo

=== 2013 ===
Film	No	Song	Composer(s)	Writer(s)	Co-artist(s)
Bombay Talkies	2595	Apna Bombay Talkies	Amit Trivedi	Swanand Kirkire	Udit Narayan, Kumar Sanu, Shreya Ghoshal, Sonu Nigam, Kavita Krishnamurthy, Shaan, Sukhwinder Singh, Mohit Chauhan, S. P. Balasubrahmanyam
Dekho Jo Pehli Baar	2596	"Tum Meri Zindagi Ho"	Mickey Narula	S. M. Fuzail	Javed Ali
Mahabharat	2597	"Naar Naveli"	Rajendra Shiv	Asad Ajmeri	Raja Hassan
Yahi To Pyaar Hai	2598	"Ghungroo Ki Dhun Mujhe"	Suraj Dev Sahu	Suraj Dev Sahu	Udit Narayan
Yahi To Pyaar Hai	2599	"Goriya Re Goriya"	Suraj Dev Sahu	Suraj Dev Sahu	Udit Narayan

=== 2014 ===
Film	No	Song	Composer(s)	Writer(s)	Co-artist(s)
Bazaar E Husn	2600	"Har Shaam Nigahon Se"	Khayyam	Ahmed Wasi	Kavita Krishnamurthy
Kaash Tum Hote	2601	Kaash Tum Hote (Duet)"	Ram Shankar	Sudhakar Sharma	Shaan
Life Is Beautiful	2602	Manzilein Raaste Sab Tere Waste	John T. Hunt	Vimal Kashyap	Udit Narayan
Dear Vs Bear	2603	Tum Mere Dost Ban Gaye Ho	A. R. Saxena	Deepak Noor	Udit Narayan
Dirty Model	2604	"Ek Baar Keh Diyaaaa"	Shailendra Jadhav	Shailendra Jadhav	Vinod Rathod
Dirty Model	2605	"Tumne Vaada Kiya Tha"	Shailendra Jadhav	Shailendra Jadhav	Udit Narayan
Naari Teri Shakti Anokhi	2606	"Chunri Lehrai"	Sushant Das	Sudhakar Sharma	Kumar Sanu

=== 2015 ===
Film	No	Song	Composer(s)	Writer(s)	Co-artist(s)
Agni-The Fire	2607	"Mera Dil Na Laage Re"	Sanjeev-Darshan		
Give N Take	2608	"Tera Naam Likha Hai"	Nayab Raja		Udit Narayan
Hum Sab Ullu Hain	2609	"Yoon Tum Mile"	Laxmi Narayan		
Mumbai Can Dance Saala	2610	"Mahiya"	Bappi Lahiri	Taufique Palvi	Shaan
Tamasha	2611	"Agar Tum Saath Ho"	A. R. Rahman	Irshad Kamil	Arijit Singh

=== 2016 ===
Film	No	Song	Composer(s)	Writer(s)	Co-artist(s)
Chalk n Duster	2612	"Deep Shiksha"	Sandesh Shandilya	Javed Akhtar	Shradha Mishra, Sanchit Mishra
Zamaanat	2613	"Kya Mohabbat Hai"	Viju Shah	Sameer	Javed Ali
Zamaanat	2614	"Locha Lapacha"	Viju Shah	Sameer	Udit Narayan
Zamaanat	2615	"O Yaa"	Viju Shah	Sameer	Sonu Nigam

=== 2017 ===
Film	No	Song	Composer(s)	Writer(s)	Co-artist(s)
Kutumb The Family	2616	"Saiyan Saiyam Bole"	Aryan Jaiin	Aryan Jaiin	solo
Majaz- Ae Gham-e-Dil Kya Karun	2617	Kuchh Tujhko Khabar	Talat Aziz	Majaz Lakhnavi	solo

=== 2019 ===
Film	No	Song	Composer(s)	Writer(s)	Co-artist(s)
Jai Chhathi Maa	2618	"Ji Khwabon Ke Tukdon Mein"	Nayan Mani Barman	Amitabh Ranjan	solo
Junction Varanasi	2619	"Dulhan Ka Dil Bole"	Sushant-Shankar	Nikhat Khan	solo

== 2020s ==
=== 2020 ===
Film	No	Song	Composer(s)	Writer(s)	Co-artist(s)
99 Songs	2620	"Gori Godh Bhari"	A.R. Rahman	Ishaan garg	Anuradha Sriram, Shweta Mohan
Coolie No. 1	2621	"Tujhe Mirchi Lagi Toh"	Anand–Milind, Lijo George-DJ Chetas	Sameer Anjaan	Kumar Sanu

=== 2021 ===
Film	No	Song	Composer(s)	Writer(s)	Co-artist(s)
Kaagaz	2622	"Bailgaadi"	Pravesh Mallick	Rashmi Virag	Udit Narayan
Sooryavanshi	2623	"Tip Tip Song"	Tanishk Bagchi	Anand Bakshi, Tanishk Bagchi	Udit Narayan

=== 2023 ===
Film	No	Song	Composer(s)	Writer(s)	Co-artist(s)
Gadar 2	2624	"Udd Ja Kaale"	Mithoon	Anand Bakshi	Udit Narayan

=== 2024 ===
Film	No	Song	Composer(s)	Writer(s)	Co-artist(s)
Crew	2625	"Choli Ke Peeche Remix"	Laxmikant-Pyarelal, Akshay-IP	IP Singh	Diljit Dosanjh, Ila Arun, IP Singh
Amar Singh Chamkila	2626	"Naram Kaalja"	A. R. Rahman	Irshad Kamil	Richa Sharma, Pooja Tiwari, Yashita Sikka
Bad Newz	2627	“Mere Mehboob Mere Sanam”	Anu Malik Lijo George	Javed Akhtar Lijo George	Udit Narayan
Naam (2024 film)	2628	"Yuhi Nahi"	Himesh Reshammiya	Sameer Anjaan	Udit Narayan

== Replaced film songs ==
Year	Film	#	Song	Composer(s)	Lyricist(s)	Replaced By	Ref.
1990	Dil	1	"O Priya Priya"	Anand–Milind	Sameer	Anuradha Paudwal	
1990	Dil	2	"Mujhe Neend Na Aaye"	Anand–Milind	Sameer	Anuradha Paudwal	
1990	Dil	3	"Dum Duma Dum"	Anand–Milind	Sameer	Anuradha Paudwal	
1990	Dil	4	"Hum Pyar Karne Wale"	Anand–Milind	Sameer	Anuradha Paudwal	

== Non-film songs ==
Year	Album	Song	Composer(s)	Writer(s)	Co-artist(s)
1992	Rahbar	"Wadi-e-Ishq Se"	Nadeem-Shravan	Sayeed Rahi	solo
1992	Rahbar	"Yeh Koi Baat Nahin Hai"	Nadeem-Shravan	Sayeed Rahi	solo
1992	Rahbar	"Kiske Shaanon Pe"	Nadeem-Shravan	Sayeed Rahi	solo
1992	Rahbar	"Chain Payega Kahan"	Nadeem-Shravan	Madan Pal	solo
1992	Rahbar	"Apni Soorat Pe"	Nadeem-Shravan	Hasrat Jaipuri	solo
1996	Crucial Jam – The Album	"Yeh Kajli Chandni Jab"	Rythm Squad and EWC		Kumar Sanu
1996	Crucial Jam – The Album	"Premi Aashiq Awara"	Rythm Squad and EWC		Kumar Sanu
1996	Crucial Jam – The Album	"Yeh Dua Hai Meri Rabse"	Rythm Squad and EWC		Kumar Sanu
1996	Karo Itni Mohabbat Sanam	"Kaliyon Ke Gunghat"	Mickey Gupta		Kumar Sanu
1996	Karo Itni Mohabbat Sanam	"Koro Itni Mohabbat Sanam"	Mickey Gupta		Kumar Sanu
1996	Karo Itni Mohabbat Sanam	"Meri Bahon Mein Tum"	Mickey Gupta		Kumar Sanu
1996	Karo Itni Mohabbat Sanam	"Tune Kaha Hai Na"	Mickey Gupta		Kumar Sanu
1996	Karo Itni Mohabbat Sanam	"Unse Milke"	Mickey Gupta		solo
1996	Princess Takhmina	"Tohre Ke Liye"	Ajay Swami	Dr Anand Khare	Kumar Sanu
1996	Simply Love	"Aa Bhi Jao"	Danny Choranji	Dev Kohli	solo
2000	Dil Kahin Hosh Kahin	"Chandi Ka Challa"	Aadesh Shrivastava		
2004	Mere Mehboob	"Tham Ke Baras"	Raj Kumar, Aman Shlok	Satish, Betab Lucknavi	
2011	Mohabbat The Taj	"Swaagatam"			Kumar Sanu
2012	Mohabbat (album)	"Tujhse Mohabbat Karke"	K. V. Singh		Imitiaz-e
2012	Women's Day Special: Spreading Melodies Everywhere		Farid Sabri, Harish Chauhan and Gurudatt Sahil		Lata Mangeshkar, Asha Bhosle, Kavita Krishnamurthy, Shreya Ghoshal, Sunidhi Chauhan, Rekha Raj, Udit Narayan and others
2014	Return of Aashiqui	"Dil Ro Raha Hai Mera"			Udit Narayan
2014	Return of Aashiqui	"Tod Kar Mere Dil Ko"			Udit Narayan
2014	Return of Aashiqui	"Zara dheere se dil mein ana"			Kumar Sanu
2014	Rang Lini Re (Album)	"Rang Lini Re"	Sudhakar Sharma		Kumar Sanu
2014	Rajnigandha (Ghazal)	"Kya Pukarein Tumhein"	Sudeep Banerjee		Hariharan
2014	Rajnigandha (Ghazal)	"Kya Kahein Hum Tumhein"	Sudeep Banerjee		Hariharan
2014	Rajnigandha (Ghazal)	"Rajnigandha Si Mehki"	Sudeep Banerjee		Ustad Rashid Khan
2014	Rang Lini Re	"Rang Lini Re"			solo
2015	Dil Ye Deewana (Single)	"Dil Ye Deewana"	Aditya Gaur		Pankaj Kumar
2019	Madhosh Teri Aankhen	"Shaam Rang"			solo
2019	Madhosh Teri Aankhen	"Dil Kehta Hai"			Kumar Sanu
2019	Madhosh Teri Aankhen	"Dil Mein Hai Pyaar"			Jaspinder Narula
2019	Madhosh Teri Aankhen	"Yaraa Dildara"			Gurdaas Mann
2019	FLAMES-Term 2 (The Timeliners Originals)	"Khamoshiyan"	Lalit Pandit	Alok Ranjan Jha	Kumar Sanu
2020	Sitam Gar	"Aaja Aaja Piya"			solo
2020	Sitam Gar	"Thamke Baras"			solo
2020	Sitam Gar	"Barsaat Hai Lagne Laga Hai Darf"			Udit Narayan
2020	Sitam Gar	"Kya Nahi Kya Kiya"			Udit Narayan
2020	Sitam Gar	"Deewana Hai Yeh Mann"			Sonu Nigam
2020	Sitam Gar	"Ban Jaiye Iss Dil Ke"			Kunal Ganjawala
2021	Hum Hindustani (Single)	"Hum Hindustani"	Dilshaad Shabbir Shaikh		Various
2021	Super Sitara	"Humnavva Humsafar"	Himesh Reshammiya	Sameer	Alka Yagnik
2021	Mujhko Mana Lena (Single)	"Mujhko Mana Lena"	Sugat Dhanvijay	Tripurari Kumar Sharma	Ashok Ojha
2021	Jaane Kya Lage Re (Single)	"Jaane Kya Lage Re"	AMC Aman	Arafat Mehmood	AMC Aman
2023	The 90s Nostalgia	“Sapne Jo Dekhe They”	Anand Milind	Sameer Anjaan	Makarand Patankar
2023	The 90s Nostalgia	“Badi Hulchul Hai”	Anand Milind		Udit Narayan

=== Hindi TV Serial songs ===
Year	Film	Song	Composer(s)	Writer(s)	Co-artist(s)
1994	Kismat	"Saawariya Tose Laagi Re"	Dilip Sen-Sameer Sen		solo
1994	Kismat	"Main Pariyon Ki Desh Ki"	Dilip Sen-Sameer Sen		solo
2008	Yeh Rishta Kya Kehlata Hai	"Yeh Rishta Kya Kehlata Hai"			solo
2010	Saath Nibhana Saathiya	"Saath Nibhana Saathiya"			Udit Narayan

== Urdu film songs ==
Year	Film	Song name(s)	Co-singer(s)	Music director(s)
1993	Raaz	"Kaun Kehta Hai"	Kumar Sanu	Irshad Sultan
2005	Koi Tujh Sa Kahaan	"Soni Soni Soni"	Shreya Ghoshal, Udit Narayan	Amman Bobby
2005	Koi Tujh Sa Kahaan	"Koi Tujh Sa Kahan" (Title Song)	Udit Narayan	Amman Bobby
2005	Koi Tujh Sa Kahaan	"Wada Hai Mera"	Udit Narayan	Amman Bobby
2005	Koi Tujh Sa Kahaan	"Pyar Mein Kis Ne"	solo	Amman Bobby
2016	Sawal 700 Crore Dollar Ka	"Aaja Sajan Aaja"	Shaan	M. Arshad

== Other Indian languages ==
=== Assamese songs ===
Year	Film	Song name(s)	Music director(s)	Lyrics(s)	Co-singer(s)
2011	Poley Poley Urey Mon	"Aajir Ei Mitha"			solo
2011	Poley Poley Urey Mon	"Sopunot Koba"			Shaan

=== Bengali songs ===
Year	Film	Song name(s)	Music director(s)	Lyrics(s)	Co-singer(s)
1990	Badnam	"Jhal Legechhe Amar"	Bappi Lahiri	Pulak Bandopadhyay	
1990	Mandira	"Tomay Chhere Ami"	Bappi Lahiri		Amit Kumar
1992	Priya	"Priya Tumi Aamar Priya"	Bappi Lahiri	Pulak Bandopadhyay	Kumar Sanu
1992	Mon Mane Na	"Ekta Chithi Dilam Likhe anu"	Babul Bose		Udit Narayan
1992	Mon Mane Na	"Mon Mane Na"	Babul Bose		Kumar Sanu
1992	Mon Mane Na	"Raag Koro Na"	Babul Bose		
1993	Dalaal	"Bakam Bakam"	Bappi Lahiri		Kumar Sanu, Bappi Lahiri, Ila Arun
1993	Dalaal	"Probhu Ramhe Bhogobanhe"	Bappi Lahiri		Kumar Sanu
1993	Dalaal	"Sundori Jole Gelo Jole Gelo"	Bappi Lahiri		Udit Narayan
1995	Sangharsha	"Kochi Kochi"	Bappi Lahiri		Kumar Sanu
1997	Moner Manush	Tan Tana Tan	Dilip Sen-Sameer Sen		
1997	Moner Manush	Tumi Chara Keu Nei (Female)	Dilip Sen-Sameer Sen		
1997	Achena Atithi	"Premeri Sur Kare Goon Goon"	Anu Malik		Kumar Sanu
1997	Achena Atithi	"Khusir Onek Range"	Anu Malik		
1997	Mittir Barir Chhoto Bou	"Swapno Amar Shoti Hoye Jaye"	Anupam Dutta		Sonu Nigam
1997	Mittir Barir Chhoto Bou	"Jokhoni Je Dike Jayee"	Anupam Dutta		Kumar Sanu
1998	Swamir Aadesh	"Amar Ei Monete"	Anupam Dutta		Kumar Sanu
1999	Chena Achena	"Tumi Ele Mone Holo"	Anupam Dutta		Abhijeet Bhattacharya
1999	Chena Achena	"Janina Mon, Ki Je Karon"	Anupam Dutta		
1999	Biyer Phul	"Mon Na Dile Hoy Ki Prem"	Ahmed Imtiaz Bulbul		Kumar Sanu

=== Bhojpuri songs ===
Year	Film	Song	Music director(s)	Co-singer(s)
1983	Hamar Bhauji	Ho Mori Bhouji Tohari Bahiniya	Chitragupt	Suresh Wadkar
1983	Hamar Bhauji	He Ganga Maiya	Chitragupt	
1983	Hamar Bhauji	Bada Dagabaj	Chitragupt	Udit Narayan
1984	Bhaiya Dooj	"Kahanva Gail Ledkaeeyan Ho"	Chitragupt	
1984	Bhaiya Dooj	"Yaad Rakhiha Hamri Piritiya"	Chitragupt	Udit Narayan
1984	Bhaiya Dooj	"Sasuriya Jaeeha Bhaiya"	Chitragupt	
1984	Bhaiya Dooj	"Ratan Bhaiyake Lali Ghodi"	Chitragupt	
1984	Thakurayeen	"Jeeora Khol Ke Mang"	Chand Pardesi	
1985	Bihari Babu	"Anjoriya Ae Gori"	Chitragupt	Suresh Wadkar
1985	Piya Ke Gaon	"Ae Doctor Babu"	Chitragupt	Shabbir Kumar
1985	Piya Ke Gaon	Aankh Se Aankh Milke	Chitragupt	
1985	Piya Ke Gaon	Jug Jug Jiyasu Lalanwa	Chitragupt	
1985	Piya Ke Gaon	Ghir Aail Kariya Badariya	Chitragupt	
1986	Dulha Ganga Paar ke	"Kaahe Jiya Dukhawla"	Lakshman Shahbadi	
1986	Dulha Ganga Paar ke	"Tohre Se Hi Chand Surajwa"	Lakshman Shahbadi	Suresh Wadkar
1986	Ganga Jaisan Bhauji Hamar	"Maayi Re Maayi Mat Ro E Maayi"	Chitragupt	Usha Mangeshkar
1986	Ganga Jaisan Bhauji Hamar	"Baanh Ke Raakhan Rasariya Se"	Chitragupt	
1989	Hamaar Dulha	"Na Ja Chhod Ke Tu Akele"	Lakshman Shahabadi	
2007	Maati	"Madhosh Mohabbat Manba Ma"	Rajesh Gupta	Kumar Sanu
2010	Satyamev Jayate	"Dil Hawe Pyar Ke Mandir"		

=== English songs ===
Year	Film	Song name(s)	Co-singer(s)	Music director(s)
2014	The Hundred-Foot Journey	(Alap for the original film score)	solo	A. R. Rahman

=== Gujarati songs ===
Year	Film	Song name(s)	Music director(s)	Writer	Co-singer(s)
1985	Meru Malan	Ke Odhni Odhu Odhu Ne Udi Jaye"	Mahesh Naresh	Kanti Ashok	Praful Dave
1985	Meru Malan	"O Roop Raseela Chora"	Mahesh Naresh	Kanti Ashok	Praful Dave
1985	Meru Malan	"Naach Re Gori Naach"	Mahesh Naresh	Kanti Ashok	Manzoor Hussain
2018	Mari Life Tari	"Kem Kari Ne"	Devrath Sharma		solo
2018	Mari Life Tari	"Mari Life Tari"	Devrath Sharma		Devrath Sharma
2019	Daddy I Love You	"Mari Ladki Ne"	Samir - Mana		solo

=== Marathi songs ===
Year	Film	Song	Composer(s)	Lyrics	Co-singer(s)
1992	Sagle Saarkhech	"Aaj Maza Nasheeb Mhana"	Ram Lakshman		Udit Narayan

=== Malayalam songs ===
Year	Film	Song name(s)	Co-singer(s)	Music director(s)
1987	Theertham	"Bas More Nainan"	solo	Bombay Ravi
1997	Poonilamazha	"One Sip Ahaha..Two Sip"	solo	Laxmikant-Pyarelal

=== Punjabi songs ===
Year	Film	Song name(s)	Co-singer(s)	Music director(s)	Lyricist(s)
2002	Jee Aayan Nu	"Na Eh Hasda"	Harbhajan Mann	Harbhajan Mann	Babu Singh Maan
2004	Des Hoyaa Pardes	"Mauj Mastiyaan"	Gurdas Maan, Sonu Nigam, Arvinder Singh, Vinod Rathod	Jaidev Kumar	Gurdas Maan
2004	Des Hoyaa Pardes	"Tainu Pata"	Gurdas Maan	Jaidev Kumar	Gurdas Maan
2004	Des Hoyaa Pardes	"Naa Ve Rabba Naa"	Gurdas Maan	Jaidev Kumar	Gurdas Maan
2006	Mannat	"Umran Di Sanjh"	Feroz Khan	Jaidev Kumar	
2006	Waris Shah - Ishq da Waris	"Ve Kabootara Ve Kasda"	Gurdas Maan	Gurdas Maan	
2009	Tera Mera Ki Rishta	"Hatthaan Diya Lakiraan"	Feroz Khan	Jaidev Kumar	
2010	Judaaiyaan: The Separation	"Teriaan Judaaiyaan"	Harpreet Sandhu	Arsh Avtar	
2014	Work Weather Wife	"Chann"	Arsh Avtar	Harpreet Sandhu	

=== Tamil songs ===
Year	Film	Song name(s)	Co-singer(s)	Music director(s)
2005	Desam	Kaaviriya Kaaviriya	Madhushree	A. R. Rahman
2006	Krrish	"Naane Un Vaaname"	Rafaqat Ali Khan	Rajesh Roshan
2006	Krrish	"Mystic Love Mix"	Rafaqat Ali Khan	Rajesh Roshan
2007	Oram Po	"Idhu Enna Mayam"	Shankar Mahadevan	G. V. Prakash Kumar
2016	Vaaimai	"Kanpadum Un Mugham"	solo	Auggath

=== Telugu songs ===
Year	Film	Song	Music director(s)	Co-singer(s)
2002	Manasutho	"Chinni Manase"	Ashirvad	
2002	Manasutho	"Manasutho"	Ashirvad	Hariharan
2006	Krrish	"Nenemo Ningini"	Rajesh Roshan	Gopal Rao
2006	Krrish	"Mystic Love Mix"	Rajesh Roshan	Gopal Rao

=== Oriya songs ===
Year	Film	Song	Music director(s)	Songwriter (s)	Co-singer(s)
1992	Maa	"Sabu Dharamara Sabu Karamara" (female)	R D Burman	Prashanta Nanda	solo
1992	Maa	"Sabu Dharamara Sabu Karamara" (duet)	R D Burman	Prashanta Nanda	Debashish Mohapatra

=== Non-film songs ===
Year	Album	Song title	Music director	Co-singers
1988	Kajri	"Rauwa Palkan Ke Parda"	Sapan-Jagmohan	Suresh Wadkar
