= List of tallest buildings in Pune =

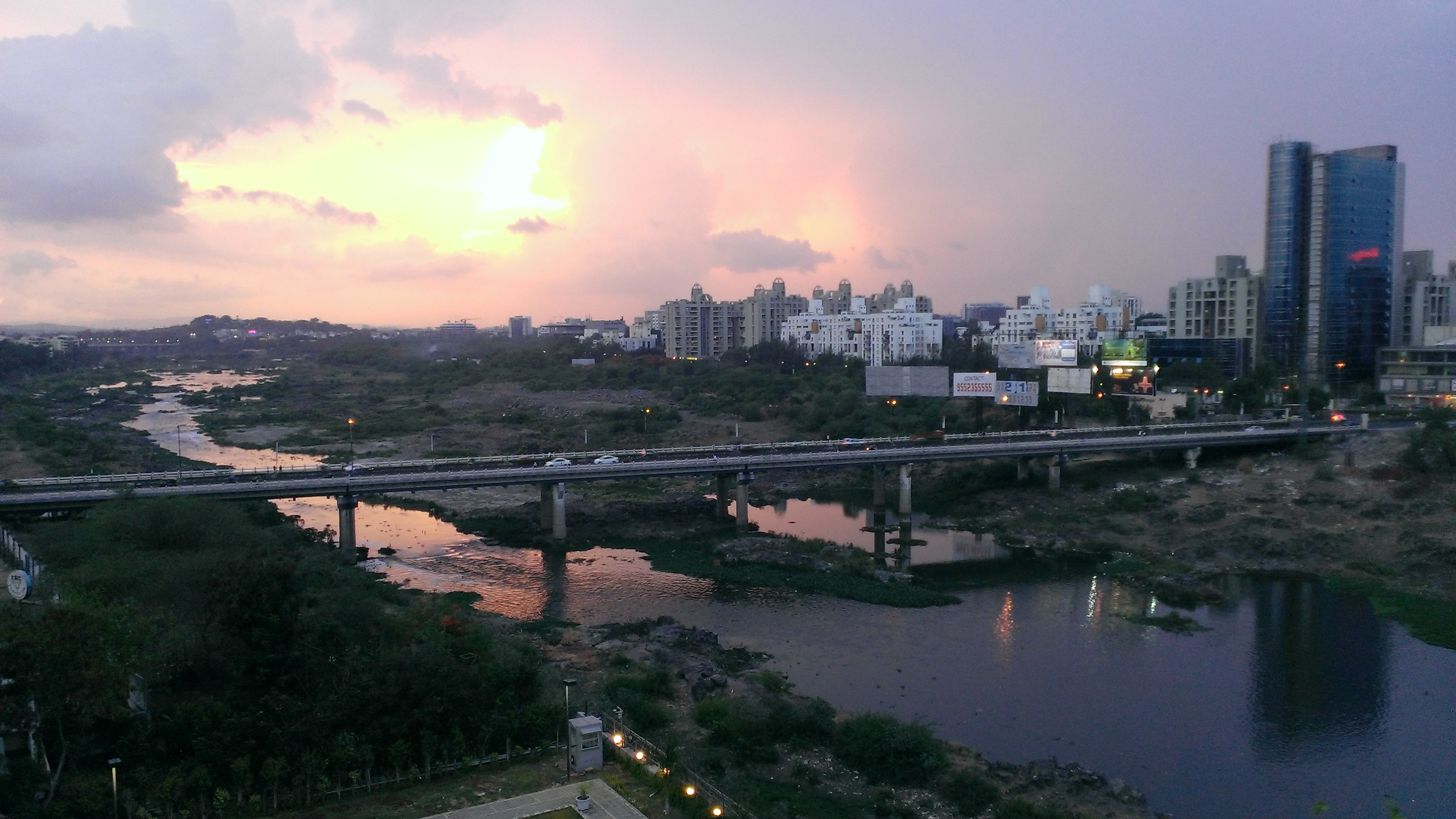
The Skyline of Pune as seen over the Mutha River.

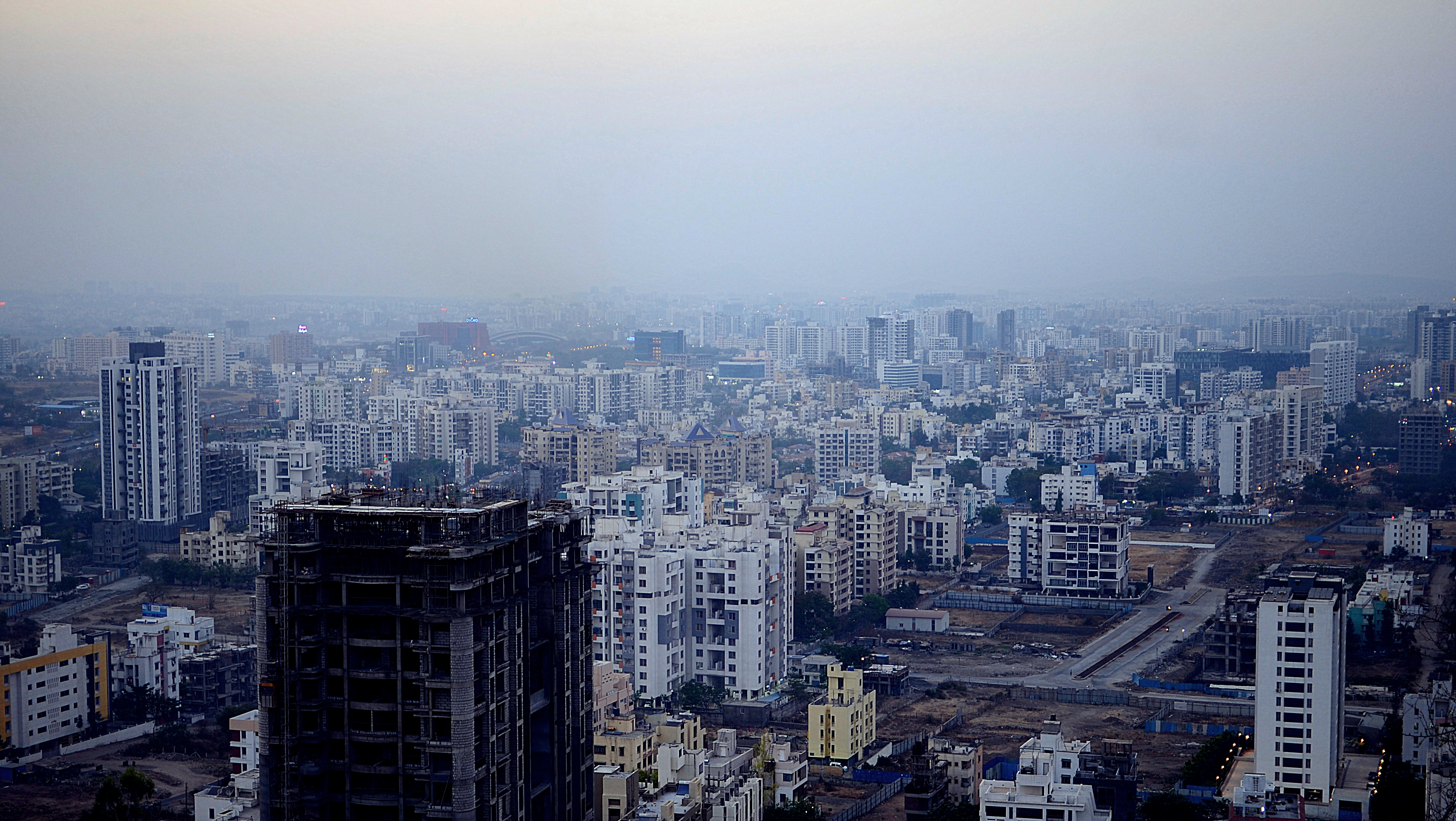
The Skyline of Pune West.

This list enumerates high-rise buildings and skyscrapers in Pune, the second largest metropolitan city in the Indian state of Maharashtra. The Eastern and Western Metropolitan Corridor of the city is witnessing a boom in the high-rise sector, with many high-rises already constructed and many more under construction. Currently Amanora Gateway Towers are the tallest buildings in Pune with 45 floors.

== Tallest buildings ==
This list ranks buildings in Pune that stand at least 80 m (260 ft), based on standard height measurement or are 20 floors tall. This includes spires and architectural details but does not include antenna masts. Only completed buildings and under-construction buildings that have been topped out are included.

Rank	Name	Location	City Corridor	Height	Floors	No of towers	Building type	Year
1	Amanora Gateway Towers	Hadapsar	Eastern	165 metres (541 ft)	45	2	Residential	2021
2	VTP Aethereus	Mahalunge	Western	119 metres (390 ft)	36	5	Residential	2025
3	Blue Ridge	Hinjawadi	Western	118 metres (387 ft)	32	2	Residential	2014
4	Nyati Iris	Kharadi	Eastern	117 metres (384 ft)	32	2	Residential	2021
5	Amanora Future Towers	Hadapsar	Eastern	115 metres (377 ft)	31	1	Residential	2014
6	Castel Royale	Khadki	Central	111 metres (364 ft)	30	4	Residential	2014
6	Amanora Neo	Hadapsar	Eastern	111 metres (364 ft)	30	4	Residential	2018
7	Blue Ridge	Hinjawadi	Western	104 metres (341 ft)	28	16	Residential	2018
8	Panchshil Towers	Kharadi	Eastern	100 metres (330 ft)	32	9	Residential	2022
9	ABIL God's Blessing	Mundhwa	Eastern	92 metres (302 ft)	25	1	Residential	2020
10	Trump Towers	Kalyani Nagar	Central	89 metres (292 ft)	24	2	Residential	2016
10	Amanora Gateway	Hadapsar	Eastern	89 metres (292 ft)	24	2	Residential	2012
10	Windermire	Koregaon	Central	89 metres (292 ft)	24	2	Residential	2012
11	Life Republic	Hinjawadi	Eastern	85 metres (279 ft)	23	26	Residential	
11	Lodha Belmendo	Gahunje	Western	85 metres (279 ft)	23	26	Residential	2016
12	Empire Square	Chinchwad	Western	81 metres (266 ft)	22	7	Residential	2016
12	Megapolis Mystic	Hinjawadi	Western	81 metres (266 ft)	22	3	Residential	2016
13	Presidential Tower by Raviraj Realty	Hinjawadi	Western	80 metres (262 ft)	27	1	Residential	

== Tallest under construction ==
This lists ranks the buildings that are under construction in pune and are planned to rise at least 150 metres (492 ft) or 40 floors tall. Proposed buildings are not included in this table.

Rank	Name	Location	Height	Floors	Expected year of completion
1	Castel Royale Tower Nine	Bopodi	170 metres (558 ft)	40	2029
2	Wyng The Camp Capitol	Somwarpeth	160 metres (525 ft)	37	2028
3	Piette T 1	Koregaon_Park	156 metres (512 ft)	37	2028
4	Piette T 2	Koregaon_Park	156 metres (512 ft)	37	2028
5	Shivaji Nagar TOD 1	Shivajinagar	151 metres (495 ft)	33	2026
6	One Boat Club Road A	Boat Club Road	151 metres (495 ft)	40	2026
7	One Boat Club Road B	Boat Club Road	151 metres (495 ft)	40	2026
8	One Boat Club Road C	Boat Club Road	151 metres (495 ft)	40	2026
9	Amanora Gateway Tower II	Hadapsar	150 metres (492 ft)	43	2027

== See also ==
- List of tallest buildings in India
- List of tallest buildings in Mumbai
- List of tallest buildings in different cities in India
