= Shirur Lok Sabha constituency =

Lok Sabha constituency in Maharashtra

Coordinates: 18.8°N 74.4°E

Shirur
- Lok Sabha constituency
- Shirur Lok Sabha Constituency map

Constituency details
- Country: India
- Region: Western India
- State: Maharashtra
- Assembly constituencies: Junnar; Ambegaon; Khed Alandi; Shirur; Bhosari; Hadapsar
- Established: 2008
- Total electors: 1,824,112
- Reservation: None

Member of Parliament
- 18th Lok Sabha
- Incumbent Dr. Amol Kolhe
- Party: NCP-SP
- Alliance: INDIA
- Elected year: 2024
- Preceded by: Shivajirao Adhalarao Patil

Shirur is one of the 48 Lok Sabha (lower house of Indian parliament) constituencies of Maharashtra state in western India. This constituency was created on 19 February 2008 as a part of the implementation of the Presidential notification based on the recommendations of the Delimitation Commission of India constituted on 12 July 2002. This constituency is one of the two newly formed Lok Sabha constituencies in Pune district after delimitation. It first held elections in 2009 and its first member of parliament (MP) was Shivajirao Adhalarao Patil of Shiv Sena. As of the 2019 elections, its MP is Dr. Amol Kolhe who is serving in his second term from this constituency.

== Vidhan Sabha segments ==
Presently, Shirur Lok Sabha constituency comprises six Vidhan Sabha (legislative assembly) segments. These segments are:

#	Name	District	Member	Party	Leading (in 2024)
195	Junnar	Pune	Sharad Sonavane	IND	NCP-SP
196	Ambegaon	Pune	Dilip Walse-Patil	NCP	NCP-SP
197	Khed Alandi	Pune	Babaji Kale	SS(UBT)	NCP-SP
198	Shirur	Pune	Dnyaneshwar Katke	NCP	NCP-SP
207	Bhosari	Pune	Mahesh Landge	BJP	NCP
213	Hadapsar	Pune	Chetan Tupe	NCP	NCP-SP

== Members of Parliament ==
Year	Name	Party
Before 2008 : Seat did not exist
2009	Shivajirao Adhalarao Patil	Shiv Sena
2014	Shivajirao Adhalarao Patil	Shiv Sena
2019	Amol Kolhe	Nationalist Congress Party
2024	Amol Kolhe	Nationalist Congress Party (Sharadchandra Pawar)

== Election results ==
=== 2024 ===
2024 Indian general elections: Shirur
Party	Candidate	Votes	%	±%
NCP-SP	Amol Ramsing Kolhe	698,692	50.83	▲9.88
NCP	Shivajirao Adhalarao Patil	5,57,741	40.58	▼8.59
Independent	Manohar Mahadu Wadekar	28,330	2.06	N/A
VBA	Dr. Anwar Shaikh	17,462	1.27	▼1.67
BSP	Rahul Raghunath Owhal	10,295	0.75	▲0.19
NOTA	None of the Above	9,661	0.70	▲0.23
Majority		1,40,951	10.25	▲5.73
Turnout		13,77,691	54.20	▼5.24
NCP-SP gain from NCP		Swing		

=== 2019 ===
2019 Indian general elections: Shirur
Party	Candidate	Votes	%	±%
NCP	Amol Ramsing Kolhe	635,830	49.17	
SS	Shivajirao Adhalarao Patil	5,77,347	44.65	−14.86
VBA	Rahul Ovhal	38,070	2.94	New
BSP	Kagadi Jamirkhan Afjal	7,247	0.56	
NOTA	None of the Above	6,051	0.47	
Majority		58,483	4.52	
Turnout		12,93,155	59.44	+0.41
NCP gain from SS		Swing		

=== General election 2014 ===
2014 Indian general elections: Shirur
Party	Candidate	Votes	%	±%
SS	Shivajirao Adhalarao Patil	643,415	59.51	+1.97
NCP	Devdatta Jayvantrao Nikam	3,41,601	31.35	−4.89
MNS	Ashok Shirpati Khandebharad	36,448	3.35	N/A
BSP	Waghmare Sarjerao Bhika	19,783	1.82	−0.26
AAP	Nikam Sopanrao Pandharinath	16,663	1.53	N/A
NOTA	None of the above	11,995	1.10	N/A
Margin of victory		3,01,814	28.16	+6.86
Turnout		10,89,573	59.73	+8.29
SS hold		Swing		

=== General election 2009 ===
2009 Indian general elections: Shirur
Party	Candidate	Votes	%	±%
SS	Shivajirao Adhalarao Patil	482,563	57.54	N/A
NCP	Vilas Vithoba Lande	3,03,952	36.24	N/A
BSP	Yashwant Zagade	17,439	2.08	N/A
Independent	Lande Vilas Mhatarba	14,196	1.69	N/A
Independent	Ram Dharma Dambale	4,541	0.54	N/A
Margin of victory		1,78,611	21.30	N/A
Turnout		8,38,728	51.44	N/A
SS gain from NCP		Swing		

== See also ==
- Khed Lok Sabha constituency
- Pune district
- List of constituencies of the Lok Sabha
