= Jurmana =

Jurmana (lit. 'fine') may refer to:

- Jurmana (1979 film), a 1979 Indian Hindi-language film
- Jurmana (1996 film), a 1996 Indian Hindi-language film by T. L. V. Prasad
