= Suresh Gore =

Indian politician (1965–2020)

Suresh Namdeo Gore

Member of Legislative Assembly of Maharashtra
- In office 2014–2019
- Preceded by: Dilip Dattatray Mohite
- Succeeded by: Dilip Dattatray Mohite

Personal details
- Born: 1965
- Died: 10 October 2020 (aged 54–55)
- Party: Shiv Sena
- Spouse: Manisha Gore
- Parent: Namdeo Sopana Gore
- Education: Bachelor's Of Commerce (B.com)
- Alma mater: Ness Wadia College

Suresh Gore (1965 – 10 October 2020) was a Shiv Sena politician from Pune district, Maharashtra. He was a member of the 13th Maharashtra Legislative Assembly. He represented the Khed Alandi Assembly Constituency.

== Life ==
Gore was elected to the Maharashtra Legislative Assembly from Shiv Sena in 2014. He represented the Khed Alandi Assembly Constituency. His term ended in 2019.

Gore was diagnosed with COVID-19 in September 2020, amid the COVID-19 pandemic in India. After receiving initial treatment in Chakan, Pune, he was moved to Ruby Hospital in Pune. He died there from the disease on 10 October 2020, aged 55.

== Positions held ==
- 2012: Elected as member of Pune Zilla Parishad

== See also ==
- Shirur Lok Sabha constituency
