= Kalyaani Singh =

Indian film producer, director (born 1966)

- Born: Kalyaani Singh; 11 March 1966 (age 60); Patna, Bihar, India
- Occupations: Film Producer, Film Director
- Spouse: Maann Singh
- Children: 1

Kalyaani Singh (born 11 March 1966) is an Indian film producer and director who works in Hindi cinema. She has produced several Bollywood films namely Gunehgar, Jurmana, Raja Bhaiya, Krishan Avtaar, Kranti Kshetra, Why I Killed Gandhi, Gehri Chaal and Nanak Naam Jahaz Hai.

== Early life and career ==
Kalyaani Singh worked in many advertisement films apart from Doordarshan serial Aashiyana. Later she came into film production and produced films like Gunehgar, Raja Bhaiya and Why I Killed Gandhi.

In 2022, The film 'Why I Killed Gandhi' produced by Kalyaani had created a controversy, NCP MP Amol Kolhe played the role of Nathuram Godse in the film, which created a controversy and NCP president Sharad Pawar supported Kolhe.

Kalyaani is married to producer Maann Singh.

Nanak Naam Jahaz Hai, produced and directed by Kalyaani, will release in cinemas across the country on May 24, 2024. the film stars Mukesh Rishi, Vindu Dara Singh, Gavie Chahal and Sardar Sohi in lead roles.

== Filmography ==
Year	Film	Roll	References
1993	Krishan Avataar	Co - Producer	
1994	Kranti Kshetra	Co - Producer	
1995	Gunehgar	Producer	
1996	Jurmana	Producer	
2003	Raja Bhaiya	Producer	
2022	Why I Killed Gandhi	Producer	
2024	Nanak Naam Jahaz Hai	Writer & Director	
