= Asia New Star Model Festival - Face of India =

Face of India is a model search organisation founded by Badal Saboo. It holds the Face of India model hunt each year for aspiring professional models across India.

This year, 2016, was the second time that India participated in the Asia New Star Model Contest.Pune Fashion Week partnered with Korea Model Association [KMA] to announce the dates. Nepal has a similar contest also created by Badal Saboo.

Pune Fashion Week, a group company had joined hands with Korea Model Association (KMA) to give Indian fashion models & designers international exposure. As a part of this association, model auditions are held pan-India in top cities to search for the Face of India. The winners stand a chance to represent India at the Asia Festival.

KMA has been organizing Asia’s largest Model Festival called Asia Model Festival for the past 10 years.

The Face of India 2016 pageant took place on 14 February 2016 at Amanora Town Center, Pune. Rishabh Bajaj and Riddhi Kumar won the title and will represent India at Asia’s New Star Model Contest to be held on 22 May 2016 at Suwon, South Korea. 25 countries will participate in the event. First runner-up titles went to Jitesh Thakur & Surabhi Nigam while Ankush Kukreja & Reena Barot finished as second runners-up.

The jury comprised some prominent names - International model Elena Fernandez, founder of Pune Fashion Week Badal Saboo, leading fashion designer Nivedita Saboo and Delegates from Korea, along with Rohit Gupta and Vikram Kotnis.

The event was witnessed by the city’s elite along with a fervent crowd at Amanora. The attending Korean families came dressed in beautiful traditional Korean attire to cheer the winners.

The fashion industry now has their eyes on the Asia New Star Model Festival that’s set to be held in South Korea this May
