= RCBC =

RCBC may refer to:

- Rizal Commercial Banking Corporation known as RCBC Bank
- Royal Connaught Boat Club
- Robinson College Boat Club
- Rowan College at Burlington County
