= Why I Killed Gandhi =

- Directed by: Ashok Tyagi
- Written by: Kalyaani Singh
- Based on: Assassination of Mahatma Gandhi
- Produced by: Kalyaani Singh
- Starring: Amol Kolhe
- Release date: 2017
- Running time: 45 minutes

Why I Killed Gandhi is a biographical drama movie about the assassination of Mahatma Gandhi. This is a short film which runs for 45 minutes. This movie shows the reason that Nathuram Godse provided for assassinating Gandhi during his trials in court. The role of Nathuram Godse has been played by Amol Kolhe.
