= Shirur Assembly constituency =

Constituency of the Maharashtra legislative assembly in India

Coordinates: 18.83°N 74.37°E

Shirur
- Constituency No. 198 for the Maharashtra Legislative Assembly

Constituency details
- Country: India
- Region: Western India
- State: Maharashtra
- District: Pune
- Lok Sabha constituency: Shirur
- Established: 1951
- Total electors: 466,444
- Reservation: None

Member of Legislative Assembly
- 15th Maharashtra Legislative Assembly
- Incumbent Dnyaneshwar Katke
- Party: NCP
- Alliance: NDA
- Elected year: 2024

Shirur Assembly constituency (formerly Sirur) is one of the Vidhan Sabha (legislative assembly) constituencies of Maharashtra state, western India. This constituency is located in Pune district, and it is a segment of Shirur Lok Sabha constituency.

== Geographical scope ==
The constituency comprises revenue circles Nhavare, Wadgaon Rasai and Talegaon Dhamdhere, Shirur Saja and Karanjawane Saja of Shirur revenue circle and Shirur Municipal council all belonging to Shirur taluka and revenue circles Wagholi and Urali Kanchan belonging to Haveli taluka.

== Members of the Legislative Assembly ==
Election	Member	Party
1952	Viththal Dattatreya Ghate	Indian National Congress
1957	Shamkant Damodar More	Praja Socialist Party
1962	Raosaheb Baburao Pawar	Indian National Congress
1967	Shamkant Damodar More	Praja Socialist Party
1972	Popatrao Haribhau Kokare	Indian National Congress
1978	Baburao Bhausaheb Daundkar	Janata Party
1980	Suryakant Gulabrao Palande	Indian National Congress
1985	N. N. Thite alias Bapusaheb Thite	Indian Congress (Socialist)
1990	N. N. Thite alias Bapusaheb Thite	Indian National Congress
1995	Popatrao Hariba Gawade	Indian National Congress
1999	Popatrao Hariba Gawade	Nationalist Congress Party
2004	Baburao Kashinath Pacharne	Bharatiya Janata Party
2009	Ashok Raosaheb Pawar	Nationalist Congress Party
2014	Pacharne Baburao Kashinath	Bharatiya Janata Party
2019	Ashok Raosaheb Pawar	Nationalist Congress Party
2024	Dnyaneshwar Alias Mauli Aba Katke	Nationalist Congress Party

== Election results ==
=== Assembly Election 2024 ===
2024 Maharashtra Legislative Assembly election : Shirur
Party	Candidate	Votes	%	±%
NCP	Dnyaneshwar Alias Mauli Aba Katke	192,281	60.29%	New
NCP-SP	Ashok Raosaheb Pawar	117,731	36.91%	New
SaSP	Daphal Tukaram Namdev	3,152	0.99%	New
NOTA	None of the above	2,157	0.68%	▼0.03
Margin of victory		74,550	23.37%	▲7.21
Turnout		321,088	68.84%	▲1.53
Total valid votes		318,931		
Registered electors		466,444		▲21.37
NCP gain from NCP		Swing	▲3.79	

=== Assembly Election 2019 ===
2019 Maharashtra Legislative Assembly election : Shirur
Party	Candidate	Votes	%	±%
NCP	Ashok Raosaheb Pawar	145,131	56.50%	▲18.51
BJP	Pacharne Baburao Kashinath	103,627	40.34%	▼2.75
VBA	Chandan Kisanrao Sondekar	3,148	1.23%	New
MNS	Kailas Sambhaji Narke	1,933	0.75%	▼5.59
NOTA	None of the above	1,827	0.71%	▲0.08
Margin of victory		41,504	16.16%	▲11.07
Turnout		258,688	67.31%	▼2.33
Total valid votes		256,853		
Registered electors		384,323		▲23.78
NCP gain from BJP		Swing	▲13.41	

=== Assembly Election 2014 ===
2014 Maharashtra Legislative Assembly election : Shirur
Party	Candidate	Votes	%	±%
BJP	Pacharne Baburao Kashinath	92,579	43.09%	▲22.36
NCP	Ashok Raosaheb Pawar	81,638	37.99%	▲8.56
SS	Satav Sanjay Amrutrav	17,187	8.00%	New
MNS	Bhondave Sandip Uttam	13,621	6.34%	New
INC	Kamlakar Gulabrao Satav	4,246	1.98%	New
BSP	Aware Balaso Bhaskar	1,925	0.90%	▼0.05
NOTA	None of the above	1,349	0.63%	New
Margin of victory		10,941	5.09%	▲0.96
Turnout		216,224	69.64%	▲5.36
Total valid votes		214,869		
Registered electors		310,489		▲8.89
BJP gain from NCP		Swing	▲13.66	

=== Assembly Election 2009 ===
2009 Maharashtra Legislative Assembly election : Shirur
Party	Candidate	Votes	%	±%
NCP	Ashok Raosaheb Pawar	53,936	29.43%	▼13.03
Independent	Baburao Kashinath Pacharne	46,369	25.30%	New
BJP	Bandal Mangaldas Vitthalrao	37,996	20.73%	▼28.39
Independent	Gavari Nivruttianna Ganpatrao	20,521	11.20%	New
Independent	Prof. K. D. Kanchan	13,645	7.45%	New
Independent	Adv. Laxman Bapurao Yele	2,527	1.38%	New
RSPS	Vikas Sadashiv Lawande	2,486	1.36%	▲0.69
BSP	Awchar Murlidhar Vitthalrao	1,739	0.95%	▼1.10
Margin of victory		7,567	4.13%	▼2.52
Turnout		183,280	64.28%	▼4.41
Total valid votes		183,270		
Registered electors		285,129		▲36.11
NCP gain from BJP		Swing	▼19.69	

=== Assembly Election 2004 ===
2004 Maharashtra Legislative Assembly election : Shirur
Party	Candidate	Votes	%	±%
BJP	Baburao Kashinath Pacharne	70,601	49.12%	▲24.89
NCP	Gawade Popatrao Hariba	61,041	42.46%	▲1.12
BSP	Kudale Somnath Dnyanoba	2,951	2.05%	New
Independent	Phadke Laxman Sonba	1,368	0.95%	New
RSPS	Bidgar Ramkrishna Rakhmaji	968	0.67%	New
Margin of victory		9,560	6.65%	▼1.26
Turnout		143,897	68.69%	▲1.43
Total valid votes		143,745		
Registered electors		209,482		▲31.43
BJP gain from NCP		Swing	▲7.78	

=== Assembly Election 1999 ===
1999 Maharashtra Legislative Assembly election : Shirur
Party	Candidate	Votes	%	±%
NCP	Gawade Popatrao Hairba	41,957	41.34%	New
INC	Pacharne Baburao Kashinath	33,930	33.43%	▲2.65
BJP	Jayashreetai Ashok Palande	24,587	24.23%	▲7.35
Independent	Parbhau Baban Gawade	848	0.84%	New
Margin of victory		8,027	7.91%	▲7.34
Turnout		107,197	67.26%	▼11.02
Total valid votes		101,482		
Registered electors		159,388		▲1.29
NCP gain from INC		Swing	▲10.56	

=== Assembly Election 1995 ===
1995 Maharashtra Legislative Assembly election : Shirur
Party	Candidate	Votes	%	±%
INC	Gawade Popatrao Hariba	36,897	30.78%	▼8.03
Independent	Pacharne Baburao Kashinath	36,219	30.21%	New
BJP	Palande Jayashreetai Ashokrao	20,231	16.88%	▼8.11
JD	Khaire Balasaheb Prabhakar	18,540	15.47%	▼12.98
Independent	Major Ramkrishna Gadgil (Retd)	2,925	2.44%	New
Independent	Kadam Gautam Namdeo	1,573	1.31%	New
BSP	Suresh Kisanrao Narke	1,298	1.08%	New
Independent	Sakat Chandrakant Vishwnath	1,008	0.84%	New
Margin of victory		678	0.57%	▼9.79
Turnout		123,183	78.28%	▲13.10
Total valid votes		119,877		
Registered electors		157,352		▲6.92
INC hold		Swing	▼8.03	

=== Assembly Election 1990 ===
1990 Maharashtra Legislative Assembly election : Shirur
Party	Candidate	Votes	%	±%
INC	N. N. Alias Bapusaheb Thite	36,499	38.81%	▼7.25
JD	Kakade Sambhaji Sahebrao	26,759	28.45%	New
BJP	Sambhaji Vithoba Bhujbal	23,499	24.99%	New
Independent	Suryakant Gulabrao Palande (Kaka)	5,610	5.97%	New
Doordarshi Party	Shyamlal Alaguram Kevat	752	0.80%	New
Margin of victory		9,740	10.36%	▲4.60
Turnout		95,922	65.18%	▲0.29
Total valid votes		94,040		
Registered electors		147,166		▲30.85
INC gain from IC(S)		Swing	▼13.01	

=== Assembly Election 1985 ===
1985 Maharashtra Legislative Assembly election : Shirur
Party	Candidate	Votes	%	±%
IC(S)	Bapusaheb Thite	36,994	51.82%	New
INC	Dhariwal Rasiklal Manikchand	32,880	46.06%	New
Independent	Gaikwa Rajendra Nathu	790	1.11%	New
Independent	Barmecha Santosh Kisanbhau	554	0.78%	New
Margin of victory		4,114	5.76%	▼36.35
Turnout		72,984	64.89%	▲6.32
Total valid votes		71,389		
Registered electors		112,473		▲13.97
IC(S) gain from INC(U)		Swing	▼16.70	

=== Assembly Election 1980 ===
1980 Maharashtra Legislative Assembly election : Shirur
Party	Candidate	Votes	%	±%
INC(U)	Palande Suryakant Gulabrao	38,648	68.52%	New
INC(I)	Dhariwal Rasiklal Manikchand	14,897	26.41%	New
BJP	Daundkar Baburao Bhausaheb	2,353	4.17%	New
[[Janata Party (Secular) Raj Narain|Janata Party (Secular) Raj Narain]]	More Shamkant Damodhar	502	0.89%	New
Margin of victory		23,751	42.11%	▲29.31
Turnout		57,796	58.57%	▼5.76
Total valid votes		56,400		
Registered electors		98,685		▲5.81
INC(U) gain from JP		Swing	▲12.12	

=== Assembly Election 1978 ===
1978 Maharashtra Legislative Assembly election : Shirur
Party	Candidate	Votes	%	±%
JP	Daundkar Baburao Bhausaheb	32,727	56.40%	New
INC	Palande Suryakant Gulabrao	25,299	43.60%	▼10.40
Margin of victory		7,428	12.80%	▼10.84
Turnout		59,992	64.33%	▲10.01
Total valid votes		58,026		
Registered electors		93,263		▲21.28
JP gain from INC		Swing	▲2.40	

=== Assembly Election 1972 ===
1972 Maharashtra Legislative Assembly election : Shirur
Party	Candidate	Votes	%	±%
INC	Kokare Popatrao Haribhau	21,924	54.00%	▲15.98
RPI	Gujar Raikumar Bhogilal	12,325	30.36%	New
ABJS	Baburao B. Daundkar	6,352	15.64%	▲8.53
Margin of victory		9,599	23.64%	▲14.24
Turnout		41,772	54.32%	▼0.42
Total valid votes		40,601		
Registered electors		76,897		▲10.97
INC gain from PSP		Swing	▲6.57	

=== Assembly Election 1967 ===
1967 Maharashtra Legislative Assembly election : Shirur
Party	Candidate	Votes	%	±%
PSP	Shamkant Damodar More	16,814	47.43%	▲4.98
INC	Raosaheb Baburao Pawar	13,480	38.02%	▼8.40
ABJS	Baburao B. Daundkar	2,521	7.11%	New
Independent	P. F. Khabiya	2,010	5.67%	New
Independent	B. B. Sarode	628	1.77%	New
Margin of victory		3,334	9.40%	▲5.43
Turnout		37,930	54.74%	▲6.74
Total valid votes		35,453		
Registered electors		69,295		▲16.64
PSP gain from INC		Swing	▲1.01	

=== Assembly Election 1962 ===
1962 Maharashtra Legislative Assembly election : Shirur
Party	Candidate	Votes	%	±%
INC	Raosaheb Baburao Pawar	12,395	46.42%	▲26.02
PSP	Shamkant Damodar More	11,334	42.45%	▼25.81
PWPI	Madhavrao Wamanrao Pharate	1,566	5.87%	New
ABJS	Babanrao Balasaheb Dhumal	1,404	5.26%	New
Margin of victory		1,061	3.97%	▼43.90
Turnout		28,518	48.00%	▲2.44
Total valid votes		26,699		
Registered electors		59,409		▲14.52
INC gain from PSP		Swing	▼21.84	

=== Assembly Election 1957 ===
1957 Bombay State Legislative Assembly election : Shirur
Party	Candidate	Votes	%	±%
PSP	Shamkant Damodar More	16,135	68.26%	New
INC	Gujar Rajkumar Bhogilal	4,821	20.40%	▼23.96
Independent	Mokashi Mahanrao Bajirao	2,681	11.34%	New
Margin of victory		11,314	47.87%	▲38.80
Turnout		23,637	45.56%	▲7.60
Total valid votes		23,637		
Registered electors		51,877		▲11.24
PSP gain from INC		Swing	▲23.90	

=== Assembly Election 1952 ===
1952 Bombay State Legislative Assembly election : Shirur
Party	Candidate	Votes	%	±%
INC	Ghate Vithal Dattatraya	7,853	44.36%	New
PWPI	Jedhe Yeshwant Baburao	6,248	35.30%	New
Socialist	Shamkant Damodar More	2,179	12.31%	New
Independent	Shinde Baburao Marutrao	1,421	8.03%	New
Margin of victory		1,605	9.07%	
Turnout		17,701	37.96%	
Total valid votes		17,701		
Registered electors		46,636		
INC win (new seat)				
