= Krishan Avtaar =

- Theatrical release poster
- Directed by: Ashok Gaikwad
- Produced by: Raajiv Kumar; Kalyaani Singh (co-producer); Maann Singh (co-producer)
- Starring: Mithun Chakraborty; Paresh Rawal; Shakti Kapoor; Paresh Rawal; Somy Ali; Sujata Mehta
- Music by: Nadeem-Shravan
- Production company: Saptarishi Films
- Release date: 25 June 1993
- Running time: 140 minutes
- Language: Hindi

Krishan Avtaar is a 1993 Indian Hindi-language action film directed by Ashok Gaikwad, produced by Raajiv Kumar, co-produced by Kalyaani Singh and Maann Singh, starring Mithun Chakraborty, Somy Ali, Hashmat Khan, Paresh Rawal and Sujata Mehta.

== Plot ==
Police Inspector Krishan Kumar lives a middle class life with his lovely wife, Suman. Suman gets pregnant and gives birth to a baby girl but dies, leaving Krishan widowed, heart-broken and devastated. Krishan also encounters a tumor, which is presently inoperable, and may eventually lead to his death. Then a large number of the city's children go missing, and Krishan, together with Inspector Avtaar are assigned to investigate this matter. They are also asked to investigate the murder of fellow police inspector Vishnu Sawant. Krishan's investigation leads him to corruption in his very own department; the involvement of a prominent minister in the government; and the daughter of Inspector Sawant himself. Faced with failing health and vision, Krishan must make his move quickly before he becomes totally disabled from doing any more police work.

== Cast ==
- Mithun Chakraborty as Police Inspector Krishan Kumar
- Somy Ali as Sonia Sawant
- Sujata Mehta as Suman
- Paresh Rawal as JD
- Shakti Kapoor as Maqsood Patel
- Laxmikant Berde as Lallan
- Tinnu Anand as Banarasi Das
- Raza Murad as Commissioner Deshpande
- Shiva Rindani
- Goga Kapoor as Inspector Sawant
- Avtar Gill as Inspector Raghuveer
- Deep Dhillon as Pasha
- Anjana Mumtaz as Mrs Sawant
- Bharat Kapoor as Jamnadas, Landlord
- Mac Mohan
- Gavin Packard as Peter
- Guddi Maruti as Mary
- Hashmat Khan as Inspector Avtaar
- Baby Udita Gaur
- Ankush Mohit
- Jay Kalgutkar

== Soundtrack ==
| # | Title | Singer(s) |
|---|---|---|
| 1 | "Mera Mehboob Mujhse Aise Mila" | Vinod Rathod, Alka Yagnik |
| 2 | "Humse Pyar Karo" | Vinod Rathod, Alka Yagnik |
| 3 | "Gudiya Pyari Pyari Gudiya" | Vinod Rathod |
| 4 | "I Love You Daddy" | Sarika Kapoor |
| 5 | "Nigahon Ke Sawal Ka Nigahon" | Alka Yagnik |
| 6 | "Phir Se Armaan Jaag Uthe" | Alisha Chinai |
