= Yogesh Tilekar =

Indian politician

Yogesh Pundalik Tilekar
- योगेश टिळेकर
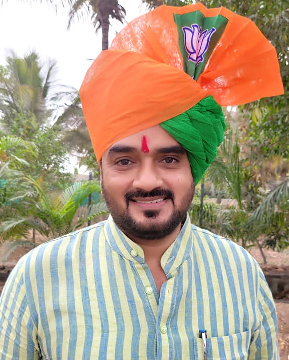

Member of Maharashtra Legislative Council
- Incumbent
- Assumed office 28 July 2024
- Governor: C. P. Radhakrishnan
- Chairman of Council: Ram Shinde
- Constituency: Elected by MLAs

Member of Maharashtra Legislative Assembly
- In office 2014–2019
- Preceded by: Mahadeo Babar
- Succeeded by: Chetan Tupe
- Constituency: Hadapsar

Personal details
- Party: Bharatiya Janata Party

Yogesh Pundalik Tilekar aka "Yogesh Anna" is an Indian politician and member of the Bharatiya Janata Party. Tilekar was Corporator in Pune Municipal Corporation (PMC) and was first term member of the Maharashtra Legislative Assembly in 2014 from the Hadapsar constituency assembly in Pune. He was also the President of Bhartiya Janta Yuva Morcha (BJYM) Maharashtra State from 2014 to 2020. On 12 July 2024 he has been elected as the Member of Maharashtra Legislative Council (MLC). He is currently serving as the President of the BJP OBC Morcha, Maharashtra State, for second term.
