= Bhosari Assembly constituency =

Constituency of the Maharashtra legislative assembly in India

Coordinates: 18.63°N 73.85°E

Bhosari
- Constituency No. 207 for the Maharashtra Legislative Assembly

Constituency details
- Country: India
- Region: Western India
- State: Maharashtra
- District: Pune
- Lok Sabha constituency: Shirur
- Established: 2008
- Total electors: 608,598
- Reservation: None

Member of Legislative Assembly
- 15th Maharashtra Legislative Assembly
- Incumbent Mahesh Landge
- Party: Bharatiya Janata Party
- Alliance: National Democratic Alliance
- Elected year: 2024

Bhosari Assembly constituency is one of the Vidhan Sabha (legislative assembly) constituencies in Maharashtra state in India. This constituency is located near the cities of Pune and Chinchwad, and it is a segment of the Shirur Lok Sabha constituency.

The constituency comprises ward nos. 8 to 12, 19 to 30, 59, 60, 80 to 86 of Pimpri-Chinchwad Municipal Corporation which lies in Haveli taluka. As of 2019, its representative is Mahesh Landge of the Bharatiya Janata Party.

== Members of the Legislative Assembly ==
Year	Member	Party
Until 2008: Constituency did not exist
2009	Vilas Vithoba lande	Independent
2014	Mahesh Landge	Independent
2019	Mahesh Landge	Bharatiya Janata Party
2024	Mahesh Landge	Bharatiya Janata Party

== Election results ==
=== Assembly Election 2024 ===
2024 Maharashtra Legislative Assembly election : Bhosari
Party	Candidate	Votes	%	±%
BJP	Mahesh Kisanrao Landge	213,624	57.32%	▼3.99
NCP-SP	Ajit Damodar Gavhane	1,49,859	40.21%	New
AIMIM	Amjad Mehboob Khan	3,117	0.84%	New
Independent	Govind Haribhau Chunchune	2,904	0.78%	New
NOTA	None of the Above	2,685	0.72%	▼0.68
Margin of victory		63,765	17.11%	▼12.75
Turnout		3,75,404	61.68%	▲2.36
Total valid votes		3,72,719		
Registered electors		6,08,598		▲37.92
BJP hold		Swing	▼3.99	

=== Assembly Election 2019 ===
2019 Maharashtra Legislative Assembly election : Bhosari
Party	Candidate	Votes	%	±%
BJP	Mahesh Kisanrao Landge	159,295	61.31%	▲41.46
Independent	Vilas Vithoba Lande	81,728	31.45%	New
VBA	Shahanvaj Shaikh	13,165	5.07%	New
NOTA	None of the Above	3,636	1.40%	▲0.74
BSP	Pawar Rajendra Atmaram	1,861	0.72%	▼1.14
Margin of victory		77,567	29.85%	▲22.89
Turnout		2,63,467	59.71%	▼1.58
Total valid votes		2,59,827		
Registered electors		4,41,268		▲21.38
BJP gain from Independent		Swing	▲33.93	

=== Assembly Election 2014 ===
2014 Maharashtra Legislative Assembly election : Bhosari
Party	Candidate	Votes	%	±%
Independent	Mahesh Kisanrao Landge	60,173	27.37%	New
SS	Ubale Sulabha Rambhau	44,857	20.41%	▼9.28
NCP	Vilas Vithoba Lande	44,211	20.11%	▲3.94
BJP	Aeknath Raosaheb Pawar	43,626	19.85%	New
INC	Bhosale Hanumantrao Bhimrao Alias Anna	14,363	6.53%	New
MNS	Chikhale Sachin Tukaram	4,231	1.92%	New
BSP	Rajendra Kundlik Gaikwad	4,088	1.86%	▼1.24
NOTA	None of the Above	1,447	0.66%	New
Margin of victory		15,316	6.97%	▲6.20
Turnout		2,21,483	60.92%	▲12.30
Total valid votes		2,19,820		
Registered electors		3,63,553		▲5.66
Independent hold		Swing	▼3.08	

=== Assembly Election 2009 ===
2009 Maharashtra Legislative Assembly election : Bhosari
Party	Candidate	Votes	%	±%
Independent	Vilas Vithoba Lande	50,472	30.46%	New
SS	Ubale Sulabha Rambhau	49,200	29.69%	New
NCP	Magalatai Ashok Kadam	26,798	16.17%	New
Independent	Vasantrao (Nana) Londhe	19,068	11.51%	New
Independent	Aba Alias Dattatray R. Gaikwad	6,641	4.01%	New
BSP	Shaikh Abdul Said Talukdar	5,131	3.10%	New
Independent	Santosh Kaluram Landge	2,755	1.66%	New
Margin of victory		1,272	0.77%	
Turnout		1,65,746	48.17%	
Total valid votes		1,65,713		
Registered electors		3,44,093		
Independent win (new seat)				
