= Raja Bhaiya (film) =

2003 Indian film by Raman Kumar

Raja Bhaiya (2003)
- Directed by: Raman Kumar
- Written by: Imtiaz Patel (dialogues)
- Screenplay by: Rajeev Kaul; Praful Parikh
- Story by: Rajeev Kaul; Praful Parikh
- Produced by: Kalyaani Singh; Maann Singh (presenter)
- Starring: Govinda; Aarti Chhabria; Sadashiv Amrapurkar
- Cinematography: Shripad Natu
- Music by: Nadeem-Shravan; Surinder Sodhi
- Production company: Right Image International
- Distributed by: Rajshri Productions
- Release date: 24 November 2003
- Running time: 130 minutes
- Country: India
- Language: Hindi
- Budget: ₹4.75 crore
- Box office: ₹2.58 crore

Raja Bhaiya (transl. Brother Raja) is a 2003 Indian Hindi-language comedy film produced by Kalyaani Singh and directed by Raman Kumar. It stars Govinda and Aarti Chhabria in the lead roles.

== Plot ==
Saved from committing suicide under a train, a girl with amnesia is taken care of by Raja Bhaiya and his mom. As she cannot remember her name, they name her Radha. The girl suffers from mental instability, and is unable to live the life of a mature girl. Raja's mom thinks that she will make a suitable wife for her son. Raja has taken on a life of celibacy and refuses to marry anyone. When Radha saves Raja's mom's life during a fire, Raja is indebted to her, and decides to marry her, and the marriage takes place. Radha's relatives are looking all over for her, and they eventually find her, and bring her back home. She undergoes treatment, resumes her earlier life, and has no recollection of Raja or her marriage to him. When Raja goes to ask her to come with him, she turns him down. Will Raja return to his celibacy days? Or will he find someone else to marry?

== Cast ==
- Govinda as Rajveer Singh aka Raja Bhaiya
- Aarti Chhabria as Pratibha Sahni / Radha
- Rakesh Bedi as Dr. Chandula Chatterjee
- Satyendra Kapoor as Khan Chacha
- Sadashiv Amrapurkar as Shyamu Chaubey
- Ravi Gossain as Anwar Bhai
- Vishwajeet Pradhan as Susu
- Sabbir Sarkar as Mr. Hatim
- Shama Deshpande

== Soundtrack ==
Songs composed by Nadeem-Shravan and Surinder Sodhi.

#	Title	Singer(s)	Musician(s)	Lyricist(s)
1	"Tu Jo Hans Hans Ke"	Udit Narayan, Kavita Krishnamurthy	Nadeem-Shravan	Sameer Anjaan
2	"Sunday Manao"	Govinda	Surinder Sodhi	Govinda
3	"Kehta Hai Mera Jiya"	Udit Narayan, Sunidhi Chauhan	Surinder Sodhi	Sameer Anjaan
4	"Madhosh Teri Aankhen"	Udit Narayan	Nadeem-Shravan	Maann Singh
5	"Janam Janam Jo Saath"	Udit Narayan, Alka Yagnik	Nadeem-Shravan	Sameer Anjaan
6	"Don't Touch"	Sunidhi Chauhan	Surinder Sodhi	Maann Singh

== Box office ==
The film grossed ₹2.58 crore and was unsuccessful at the box office.
