= Kranti Kshetra =

- Film DVD Cover
- Directed by: Raajiv Kumar
- Produced by: Raajiv Kumar; Kalyaani Singh (co-producer); Maann Singh (co-producer)
- Starring: Mithun Chakraborty; Pooja Bhatt; Shakti Kapoor; Gulshan Grover; Harish Kumar
- Music by: Nadeem-Shravan
- Production company: Saptarishi Films
- Release date: 26 August 1994
- Running time: 140 minutes
- Country: India
- Language: Hindi

Kranti Kshetra (transl. Field of revolution) is a 1994 Indian Hindi-language action film produced by Raajiv Kumar, co-produced by Kalyaani Singh and Maann Singh, directed by Raajiv Kumar, starring Mithun Chakraborty, Pooja Bhatt, Harish Kumar, Shakti Kapoor and Gulshan Grover. The film was released on 26 August 1994 under the banner of Saptarishi Films.

== Plot ==
Major Barkat Ali is an officer in the Indian Armed Forces. He has been assigned the task of apprehending terrorist Shaitan Singh and bringing him to justice. which he does, but not without earning the wrath of his brother, Haiwan Singh. As a result, Shaitan Singh is given the death penalty, while Barkat is assigned to a private school to teach self-defense to students. It is here that Haiwan Singh later abducts the students and hold them for ransom in exchange for the life of Barkat Ali. Barkat Ali fights to save both himself and the students, who come to understand the importance of national defense.

== Cast ==
- Mithun Chakraborty as Major Barkat Ali
- Pooja Bhatt as Pooja Sharma
- Gulshan Grover as Haiwan Singh
- Shakti Kapoor as Prem Pardeshi
- Harish Kumar as Harish Ashok Kumar Mangatrao
- Shiva Rindani as Shankara
- Puneet Issar as Shaitan Singh
- Rakesh Bedi as Professor Kaushik Choudhry
- Avtar Gill as Minister Anand Saxena
- Guddi Maruti as Gurpreet
- Raju Shrestha as Ehsan Ali
- Sudhir Dalvi as Guruji
- Suresh Oberoi as Himself
- Siddhant Salaria as Sikh Student

== Soundtrack ==
The music of the film was composed Nadeem-Shravan.

#	Title	Singer(s)
1	"Tumhara Naam Kya Hai"	Vinod Rathod, Sadhana Sargam
2	"Shor Machaongi"	Babul Supriyo, Sapna Mukherjee
3	"Jaaneman Yeh Geet Nahin"	Kumar Sanu, Sapna Mukherjee
4	"Thoda Whisky Thoda Rum"	Udit Narayan, Chandrashekhar Gadgil, Yunus Parvez
5	"Deewane Hai Hum Tere"	Vinod Rathod, Sapna Mukherjee
6	"Malan Thara Baag Mein"	Vinod Rathod, Babul Supriyo, Sapna Awasthi, Sapna Mukherjee, Suryakant Dalaich
