= Shivpratap Garudjhep =

- Theatrical release poster
- Directed by: Kartik Kendhe
- Written by: Dialogues: Amol Kolhe; Yuvraj Patil
- Screenplay by: Amol Kolhe
- Produced by: Amol Kolhe; Vilas Sawant; Sonali Ghanashyam Rao; Chandrashekhar Dhavlikar; Kartik Kendhe
- Starring: Amol Kolhe; Pratiksha Lonkar; Yatin Karyekar; Alka Kaushal; Manva Naik; Adi Irani; Shailesh Datar
- Cinematography: Sanjay Jadhav
- Edited by: Peter Gundra
- Music by: Shashank Pawar; Rohit Nagbhide
- Production company: Jagdamba Creations
- Distributed by: AA Films
- Release date: 5 October 2022
- Country: India
- Language: Marathi

Shivpratap Garudjhep is a 2022 Marathi language historical drama film directed by Kartik Kendhe and produced by Jagadamba Creations. It was theatrically released on 5 October 2022 and digitally premiered on 4 November 2022 on TFS Play.

== Cast ==
- Amol Kolhe as Shivaji
- Pratiksha Lonkar as Jijabai
- Yatin Karyekar as Aurangzeb
- Harak Amol Bhartiya as Sambhaji
- Alka Kaushal as Jagantara
- Manva Naik as Soyarabai
- Adi Irani as Jafar Khan
- Shailesh Datar as Jai Singh I
- Savita Malpekar
- Pallavi Vaidya as Putalabai
- Harish Dudhale as Ramsingh
- Shripad Panse as Moropant Pingale
- Vishwajeet Phadte as Faulad Khan
- Ramesh Rokade as Hiroji Farzad
- Ajay Talkire as Bahiirji Naik

== Release ==
=== Theatrical ===
Shivpratap Garudjhep was theatrically released on 5 October 2022 in Maharashtra.

=== Home media ===
After the theatrical release, the film was OTT release on 4 November 2022 on TFS Play.

== Critical reception ==
A Times of India review gave the film a 3 out of 5 star rating.
