= Rangkarmi =

- Theatrical release poster
- Directed by: Sanjeev Kolte
- Starring: Amol Kolhe; Sheetal Dabholkar; Sharmishtha Raut; Mohan Joshi
- Cinematography: Jitendra Acharekar
- Edited by: Failzal Mahadik
- Music by: Pravin Kuwar
- Release date: 27 December 2013
- Country: India
- Language: Marathi

Rangkarmi is a 2013 Indian Marathi-language film directed by Sanjeev Kolte. Amol Kolhe, Sheetal Dabholkar, Sharmishtha Raut and Mohan Joshi star in lead roles, produced by Shashi Mittal and Sumit H Mittal. It was theatrically released on 27 December 2013.

== Synopsis ==
Various talented artists working in the Marathi theatre and film industry realise that an artist's real essence lies in honoring their work and connections with their colleagues.

== Cast ==
- Amol Kolhe
- Sheetal Dabholkar
- Sharmishtha Raut
- Mohan Joshi
- Prafull Samant
- Devendra Dodke
- Dinesh Kanade
- Mahesh Bodas
- Deepjyoti Naik
- Mrunal Gawde

== Production ==
On 7 July 2013, principal photography started, Filming was completed on 28 October 2013.

== Reception ==
=== Critical response ===
A reviewers of Loksatta wrote "It is true that the director has shown this humor very well. Tragedy of the artist cannot rise to a height. May not achieve expected results". Saumitra Pote from Maharashtra Times says "this movie is a good effort. The actors also support the director well. If more attention is paid to the writing, we can expect more good works from this team in the coming time". A reviewer of Divya Marathi wrote "The slow pace in the second half makes the story boring. Still, if you want to know the exact difference between the world of film and reality, there is no problem for a colorist to climb the steps of the theater".
