= Shivajirao Adhalarao Patil =

Indian politician

Shivajirao Adhalrao Patil MP

Member of Parliament, Lok Sabha
- In office (2009-2014), (2014 – 2019)
- Succeeded by: Amol Kolhe
- Constituency: Shirur Lok Sabha Constituency
- In office (2004–2009)
- Preceded by: Ashok Mohol
- Constituency: Khed Lok Sabha Constituency

Personal details
- Born: 8 May 1956 (age 70) Ambegaon, Pune district
- Party: Nationalist Congress Party (2024-present)
- Other political affiliations: Shiv Sena (1966-2024)
- Spouse: Kalpana
- Children: 2 sons
- As of 16 September, 2006

Shivajirao Adhalrao Patil (born 8 May 1956) is a former Member of Parliament of the Lok Sabha from Shirur belonging to the Nationalist Congress Party. Shivajirao Adhalrao Patil won the Shirur Lok Sabha seat by a margin of 301,814 votes. He is a member of the 14th Lok Sabha and 15th Lok Sabha of India. He was also re-elected to the 16th Lok Sabha. He represents the Shirur constituency in Pune District of Maharashtra.

== Positions held ==
- 2004: Elected to 14th Lok Sabha(1st term)
- 2006: Member, Standing Committee on Defence
- 2009: Re-elected to 15th Lok Sabha(2nd term)
- 2009: Member, Standing Committee on Information Technology
- 2014: Re-elected to 16th Lok Sabha(3rd term)
- 2014: Member, Committee on Science & Technology, Environment & Forests

== See also ==
- Lok Sabha
