= Khed Alandi Assembly constituency =

Constituency of the Maharashtra legislative assembly in India

Coordinates: 18.527°N 73.862°E

Khed Alandi
- Constituency No. 197 for the Maharashtra Legislative Assembly

Constituency details
- Country: India
- Region: Western India
- State: Maharashtra
- District: Pune
- Lok Sabha constituency: Shirur
- Established: 1967
- Total electors: 376,929
- Reservation: None

Member of Legislative Assembly
- 15th Maharashtra Legislative Assembly
- Incumbent Babaji Kale
- Party: SS(UBT)
- Alliance: MVA
- Elected year: 2024

Khed Alandi Assembly constituency is one of the 288 Vidhan Sabha (legislative assembly) constituencies of Maharashtra state, western India. This constituency is located in Pune district. It is a segment of Shirur (Lok Sabha constituency).

== Geographical scope ==
The constituency comprises Khed taluka also known as Rajgurunagar.

== Members of the Legislative Assembly ==
Year	Member	Party
1967	S. M. Satkar	Indian National Congress
1972	Sahebrao Patil	Indian National Congress
1978	Ram Kandge	Indian National Congress
1980	Ram Kandge	Indian National Congress (U)
1985	Narayanrao Pawar	Indian Congress (Socialist)
1990	Narayanrao Pawar	Indian National Congress
1995	Narayanrao Pawar	Indian National Congress
1999	Narayanrao Pawar	Nationalist Congress Party
2004	Dilip Mohite	Nationalist Congress Party
2009	Dilip Mohite	Nationalist Congress Party
2014	Suresh Gore	Shiv Sena
2019	Dilip Mohite	Nationalist Congress Party
2024	Babaji Kale	Shiv Sena (UBT)

^by-election

== Election results ==
=== Assembly Election 2024 ===
2024 Maharashtra Legislative Assembly election : Khed Alandi
Party	Candidate	Votes	%	±%
SS(UBT)	Babaji Kale	150,152	58.26%	New
NCP	Dilip Dattatray Mohite	98,409	38.19%	New
VBA	Ravindra Rahul Randhave	2,940	1.14%	▲0.33
NOTA	None of the Above	1,692	0.66%	▼0.12
Independent	Sahebrao Narayan Jadhav	1,618	0.63%	New
Margin of victory		51,743	20.08%	▲4.90
Turnout		259,402	68.82%	▲1.51
Total valid votes		257,710		
Registered electors		376,929		▲15.05
SS(UBT) gain from NCP		Swing	▲14.04	

=== Assembly Election 2019 ===
2019 Maharashtra Legislative Assembly election : Khed Alandi
Party	Candidate	Votes	%	±%
NCP	Dilip Dattatray Mohite	96,866	44.22%	▲8.79
SS	Suresh Namdeo Gore	63,624	29.05%	▼22.83
Independent	Atul Mahadeo Deshmukh	53,874	24.60%	New
VBA	Hiraman Raghunath Kambale	1,770	0.81%	New
NOTA	None of the Above	1,707	0.78%	▲0.22
Margin of victory		33,242	15.18%	▼1.27
Turnout		220,850	67.41%	▼3.37
Total valid votes		219,038		
Registered electors		327,618		▲15.66
NCP gain from SS		Swing	▼7.66	

=== Assembly Election 2014 ===
2014 Maharashtra Legislative Assembly election : Khed Alandi
Party	Candidate	Votes	%	±%
SS	Suresh Namdeo Gore	103,207	51.88%	▲25.67
NCP	Dilip Dattatray Mohite	70,489	35.43%	▼3.18
BJP	Bute (Patil) Sharad Anandrao	16,554	8.32%	New
MNS	Ajay Namdev Thigale	1,974	0.99%	New
INC	Vandana Manikrao Satpute	1,765	0.89%	New
Independent	Genu Nana Waje	1,640	0.82%	New
NOTA	None of the Above	1,106	0.56%	New
Margin of victory		32,718	16.45%	▲4.04
Turnout		200,193	70.68%	▲5.70
Total valid votes		198,930		
Registered electors		283,248		▲9.05
SS gain from NCP		Swing	▲13.27	

=== Assembly Election 2009 ===
2009 Maharashtra Legislative Assembly election : Khed Alandi
Party	Candidate	Votes	%	±%
NCP	Dilip Dattatray Mohite	64,726	38.61%	▼13.90
SS	Ashok Shripati Khandebharad	43,934	26.21%	New
Independent	Thakur Ramdas Namdev	40,528	24.18%	New
Independent	Javalekar Rajesh Vasantrao	15,170	9.05%	New
BSP	Bhalerao Manohar Popat	1,734	1.03%	New
RPI(A)	Swati Bhalchandra Nilegaonkar	1,538	0.92%	New
Margin of victory		20,792	12.40%	▲2.60
Turnout		167,680	64.55%	▲1.71
Total valid votes		167,630		
Registered electors		259,751		▲11.63
NCP hold		Swing	▼13.90	

=== Assembly Election 2004 ===
2004 Maharashtra Legislative Assembly election : Khed Alandi
Party	Candidate	Votes	%	±%
NCP	Dilip Dattatray Mohite	76,769	52.51%	▲10.63
Independent	Narayanrao Baburao Pawar	62,439	42.71%	New
Independent	Supe Bhagawanta Devaka	2,303	1.58%	New
Independent	Pawar Shantaram Alias Appasaheb Kondiba	1,977	1.35%	New
LJP	Darandale Sanjay Eknath	1,879	1.29%	New
Margin of victory		14,330	9.80%	▲6.45
Turnout		146,224	62.84%	▼0.20
Total valid votes		146,191		
Registered electors		232,681		▲28.16
NCP hold		Swing	▲10.63	

=== Assembly Election 1999 ===
1999 Maharashtra Legislative Assembly election : Khed Alandi
Party	Candidate	Votes	%	±%
NCP	Narayanrao Baburao Pawar	47,925	41.88%	New
SS	Dilip Dattatray Mohite	44,091	38.53%	▲31.68
INC	Adv. Gargote Shantaram Vishnu	18,090	15.81%	▼28.80
ABS	Gawali Asha Arun	4,324	3.78%	New
Margin of victory		3,834	3.35%	▲0.52
Turnout		120,902	66.59%	▼13.67
Total valid votes		114,430		
Registered electors		181,562		▲2.78
NCP gain from INC		Swing	▼2.73	

=== Assembly Election 1995 ===
1995 Maharashtra Legislative Assembly election : Khed Alandi
Party	Candidate	Votes	%	±%
INC	Narayanrao Baburao Pawar	60,436	44.61%	▼11.61
Independent	Babanrao Laxman Daware	56,597	41.78%	New
SS	Uttam Babanrao Gogawale	9,286	6.85%	▼7.57
JD	Adv. Popatrao Shankarrao Tambe Patil	3,852	2.84%	▼24.57
Independent	Ghumatkar Dnyaneshwar Gangaram	983	0.73%	New
Margin of victory		3,839	2.83%	▼25.97
Turnout		140,308	79.43%	▲16.07
Total valid votes		135,472		
Registered electors		176,644		▲5.50
INC hold		Swing	▼11.61	

=== Assembly Election 1990 ===
1990 Maharashtra Legislative Assembly election : Khed Alandi
Party	Candidate	Votes	%	±%
INC	Narayanrao Baburao Pawar	57,072	56.22%	▲20.94
JD	Takalkar Pratap Genbhau	27,830	27.42%	New
SS	Chavan Suresh Dhondiba	14,645	14.43%	New
INS(SCS)	Garud Nanasaheb Bhikoba	793	0.78%	New
Margin of victory		29,242	28.81%	▲3.36
Turnout		103,522	61.83%	▼0.01
Total valid votes		101,508		
Registered electors		167,440		▲26.47
INC gain from IC(S)		Swing	▼4.51	

=== Assembly Election 1985 ===
1985 Maharashtra Legislative Assembly election : Khed Alandi
Party	Candidate	Votes	%	±%
IC(S)	Narayanrao Baburao Pawar	48,758	60.74%	New
INC	Ghumatkar Shantaram Nathuji	28,326	35.28%	New
Independent	Davare Baban Dharmaji	1,217	1.52%	New
Independent	Bhalerao Namdeo Sagaji	905	1.13%	New
Independent	Tukaram Genu Shinde	633	0.79%	New
Margin of victory		20,432	25.45%	▲12.13
Turnout		81,949	61.90%	▲26.60
Total valid votes		80,279		
Registered electors		132,397		▲6.75
IC(S) gain from INC(U)		Swing	▲15.82	

=== Assembly Election 1980 ===
1980 Maharashtra Legislative Assembly election : Khed Alandi
Party	Candidate	Votes	%	±%
INC(U)	Kandge Ram Janardan	18,964	44.92%	New
INC(I)	Sorate Rajaram Gajanan	13,340	31.60%	▲27.44
JP	Namdeorao Krishnaji Baccje	4,871	11.54%	▼9.90
Independent	Dadasaheb Pathak	4,223	10.00%	New
Independent	Gotarne Baban Mahadeo	819	1.94%	New
Margin of victory		5,624	13.32%	▼0.46
Turnout		43,252	34.87%	▼24.80
Total valid votes		42,217		
Registered electors		124,031		▲8.67
INC(U) gain from INC		Swing	▲9.71	

=== Assembly Election 1978 ===
1978 Maharashtra Legislative Assembly election : Khed Alandi
Party	Candidate	Votes	%	±%
INC	Kandge Ram Janardan	23,646	35.21%	▼18.14
JP	Bachche Namdev Krishna	14,393	21.43%	New
Independent	Shinde Dattatray Bhikoba	12,057	17.96%	New
Independent	Pawar Narayan Baburao	8,607	12.82%	New
Independent	Bhosle Laxman Dharmaji	3,011	4.48%	New
INC(I)	Mali Mahadev Baburao	2,793	4.16%	New
Independent	Daunkar Vitthalrao Keruji	2,641	3.93%	New
Margin of victory		9,253	13.78%	▲7.07
Turnout		69,373	60.78%	▼3.78
Total valid votes		67,148		
Registered electors		114,134		▲19.62
INC hold		Swing	▼18.14	

=== Assembly Election 1972 ===
1972 Maharashtra Legislative Assembly election : Khed Alandi
Party	Candidate	Votes	%	±%
INC	Sahebrao B. Patil	31,874	53.35%	▼7.14
Independent	Shivale Manikrao Udhavrao	27,866	46.65%	New
Margin of victory		4,008	6.71%	▼38.02
Turnout		62,208	65.20%	▲3.31
Total valid votes		59,740		
Registered electors		95,415		▲12.28
INC hold		Swing	▼7.14	

=== Assembly Election 1967 ===
1967 Maharashtra Legislative Assembly election : Khed Alandi
Party	Candidate	Votes	%	±%
INC	S. M. Satikar	30,486	60.50%	New
PSP	D. B. Alias Mama	7,946	15.77%	New
ABJS	D. R. Medge	5,821	11.55%	New
SSP	V. R. Wafgaonkar	3,979	7.90%	New
Independent	S. T. Ovhal	2,162	4.29%	New
Margin of victory		22,540	44.73%	
Turnout		53,481	62.93%	
Total valid votes		50,394		
Registered electors		84,980		
INC win (new seat)				
