= Ashok Raosaheb Pawar =

Indian politician

Member of Maharashtra Legislative Assembly
- In office 2019–2024
- Preceded by: Baburao Pacharne
- Succeeded by: Dnyaneshwar Katke
- Constituency: Shirur
- In office 2009–2014
- Preceded by: Baburao Pacharne
- Succeeded by: Baburao Pacharne
- Constituency: Shirur

Personal details
- Party: Nationalist Congress Party
- Profession: Politician

Ashok Pawar (born 30 August 1958) is an Indian politician from Maharashtra who is an MLA from Shirur Assembly constituency in Pune District. He won the 2019 Maharashtra Legislative Assembly election representing the Nationalist Congress Party.

== Early life and education ==
Pawar is from Shirur, Pune District, Maharashtra. He is the son of Raosaheb Baburao Pawar. He completed his L.L.B. in 1987 at Simboisis Law College, which is affiliated with Pune University. Earlier, he did B.Sc. in Agricultural Science in 1980, at Agricultural College, Pune, which is affiliated with Mahatma Phule Krishi University, Rahuri.

== Career ==
Pawar won from Shirur Assembly constituency representing Nationalist Congress Party in the 2019 Maharashtra Legislative Assembly election. He polled 1,45,131 votes and defeated his nearest rival, Baburao Pacharne of Bharatiya Janata Party, by a margin of 41,504 votes. He first became an MLA winning the 2009 Maharashtra Legislative Assembly election defeating Baburao Pacharne by a margin of 7,567 votes. However, he lost the next election to Pacharne of BJP in the 2014 Maharashtra Legislative Assembly election, by a margin of 10,941 votes.
