= Dilip Mohite =

Indian politician (born 1959)

Dilip Dattatray Mohite Patil
- दिलीप दत्तात्रय मोहिते

Member of Maharashtra Legislative Assembly
- In office (2004-2009), (2009-2014), (2019 – 2024)
- Preceded by: Suresh Namdeo Gore
- Succeeded by: Babaji Ramchandra Kale
- Constituency: Khed Alandi Assembly constituency

Personal details
- Party: Nationalist Congress Party (Ajit Pawar)
- Spouse: Surekhatai Mohite
- Parent: Dattatray Chimajirao Mohite Patil
- Education: Shri Shivaji High School, Shel Pimpalgaon
- Occupation: Politician
- Profession: Developer

Dilip Dattatray Mohite Patil (born 1959) is an Indian Politician from Maharashtra. He was a member of the 14th Maharashtra Legislative Assembly from Khed Alandi Assembly constituency representing Nationalist Congress Party in the 2019 Assembly election.

== Early life and education ==
Mohite is from Khed Alandi, Pune district, Maharashtra. He is the son of Dattatray Chimajirao Mohite. He did his schooling at Shri Shivaji Vidhyamandir Shel Pimpalgaon and passed Class 10 in 1977.

== Career ==
Mohite became an MLA for the first time winning the 2004 Maharashtra Legislative Assembly election from Khed Alandi Assembly constituency representing Nationalist Congress Party and retained it winning the 2009 Maharashtra Legislative Assembly election. However, he lost the 2014 Assembly election to Suresh Gore of Shiva Sena but regained it winning the 2019 Maharashtra Legislative Assembly election. In 2019, he defeated his bitter rival, Gore, by a margin of 33,242 votes.
