= Gunehgar =

- Theatrical release poster
- Directed by: Vikram Bhatt
- Written by: Mahesh Bhatt
- Screenplay by: Iqbal Raj
- Story by: Mahesh Bhatt
- Produced by: Kalyaani Singh
- Starring: Mithun Chakraborty; Pooja Bhatt; Atul Agnihotri; Tisca Chopra; Kiran Kumar
- Cinematography: Bhushan Patel
- Edited by: Waman Bhonsle; Gurudutt Shirali
- Music by: Shyam-Surender
- Production company: Right Image International
- Release date: 6 January 1995
- Running time: 145 minutes
- Country: India
- Language: Hindi

Gunehgar (transl. Guilty) is a 1995 Indian Hindi-language action film produced by Kalyaani Singh, presented by Maann Singh, and directed by Vikram Bhatt, starring Mithun Chakraborty, Atul Agnihotri, Pooja Bhatt, Tisca Chopra and Kiran Kumar.

== Plot ==
The film deals with the fight against terrorism, and Mithun plays the role of D.I.G. of Police. Ajay Thakur is a long-time employee serving with the Indian police force; his motive in life involves bringing justice to the freedom fighters, who in reality are terrorists headed by Habibullah and his younger brother, Munna. All of them are on a deadly mission namely to separate Kashmir from India. Ajay meets with partial success when he shoots Munna, injuring him and thus arresting him in the process. This success gets him promoted to Deputy Inspector General (D.I.G). Later Munna manages to escape from custody and assassinates Ajay's wife whilst on the run. Meanwhile, Ajay's journalist sister, Pooja meets a guy, Rohit who rescues her from her car after realising its fitted with a bomb. Pooja falls in love with Rohit but unbeknown to Pooja, Rohit is a mere pawn in the hands of Habibullah. His gang is holding Rohit's father as hostage so that he kidnaps Pooja and delivers her to his gang. Once Rohit does what Habibullah asks, his gang hold both Rohit and Pooja as hostages. Ajay manages to find out the gangs where-about which is an old mosque and he must go to negotiate the release of his sister, Pooja. Ajay with the help of police informer reaches the location where Pooja and Rohit are taken as hostage and happens fighting, here Ajay gets shoot by Habibullah while avoiding the terrorist shooting Rohit and also gets shot in the back by Habibullah who runs away and enters the jeep trying to escape away, Pooja comes to hold Ajay but Ajay tells he wish that Habibullah gets punishment instead of trying to save him who is totally wounded with multiple gun shot wounds, Rohit and Pooja together chase and capture Habibullah bring him to the mosque where Pooja delivers a speech that never they can get their beliefs be holy by killing people and so the goons inside surrender in front of the police squad who also comes to this area, while Habibullah is taken in custody, Habibullah pushes away the police and tries to shoot Pooja with a gun but Rohit same time takes a gun from a police and fires Habibullah killing him, at the end Pooja is praised for her bravery in a stage and Rohit claps hands and joins her.

== Cast ==
- Mithun Chakraborty as D.I.G. Ajay Thakur
- Atul Agnihotri as Rohit
- Pooja Bhatt as Pooja Thakur
- Tisca Chopra as Priya (as Priya Arora)
- Kiran Kumar as Habibullah
- Mushtaq Khan as Maulvi Parvez
- Anil Nagrath as Amirbaba
- Vishwajeet Pradhan as Munna
- Ishrat Ali as Mujihadeen member
- Ram Sethi as Mujihadeen member
- Girja Shankar as Indian Member of Parliament (Mantri)
- Mahavir Shah as Noorudin "Noora"
- Naresh Suri as Chachu

== Soundtrack ==
Gunhegaar

Soundtrack album by Shyam-Surender
- Released: 1994
- Genre: Feature film soundtrack
- Length: 32:49
- Language: Hindi
- Label: Time Audio

The music of the film was composed Shyam-Surender and the lyrics were penned by Seema Janam, Maann Singh, Mithlesh and Surender Saathi. The soundtrack was released in 1994 on audio cassette in Time Audio. The full album is recorded by Kumar Sanu, Sudesh Bhosle, Alka Yagnik and Sadhana Sargam.

#	Title	Singer(s)	Lyrics	Duration
1	"Wada Karo Yeh"	Kumar Sanu, Alka Yagnik	Maann Singh	06:35
2	"Dil Huwa Beqarar"	Kumar Sanu, Alka Yagnik	Seema Janam	06:00
3	"Kasam Se Sari Raat"	Vinod Rathod, Sadhna Sargam	Surender Sathi	04:37
4	"Rain is Falling"	Sudesh Bhosale	Surender Sathi	05:29
5	"Roothega Rab Toh Mana Loonga"	Sudesh Bhosale	Mithlesh	04:08
6	"Keh Do Na Ki Tumse Pyar Hai"	Kumar Sanu, Sadhna Sargam	Maan Singh	05:57
