= Mahadeo Babar =

Indian politician

Mahadev Babar
- महादेव बाबर
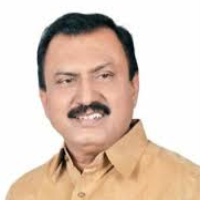

Member of Maharashtra Legislative Assembly
- In office 2009–2014
- Preceded by: Constituency created
- Succeeded by: Yogesh Tilekar
- Constituency: Hadapsar

Personal details
- Born: 05-02-1964
- Party: Shiv Sena
- Other political affiliations: Shiv Sena

Mahadev Babar (Marathi: महादेव बाबर) is an Indian politician and member of the Shiv Sena. He was elected to Maharashtra Legislative Assembly in 2009 from the Hadapsar Assembly Constituency in Pune.

== Positions held ==
- 1997 : Elected as Corporator to Pune Municipal Corporation (1st Term)
- 2002 : Reelected as Corporator to Pune Municipal Corporation (2nd Term)
- 2003 : Elected as Deputy Mayor Of Pune
- 2005 : Elected as Leader Of Opposition In Pune Municipal Corporation
- 2007 : Reelected as Corporator to Pune Municipal Corporation (3rd Term)
- 2009 : Elected to Maharashtra Legislative Assembly (1st Term)
- 2017: Elected as Pune City Shivsena Chief
