= Baburao Pacharne =

Indian politician (died 2022)

Baburao Pacharne MLA
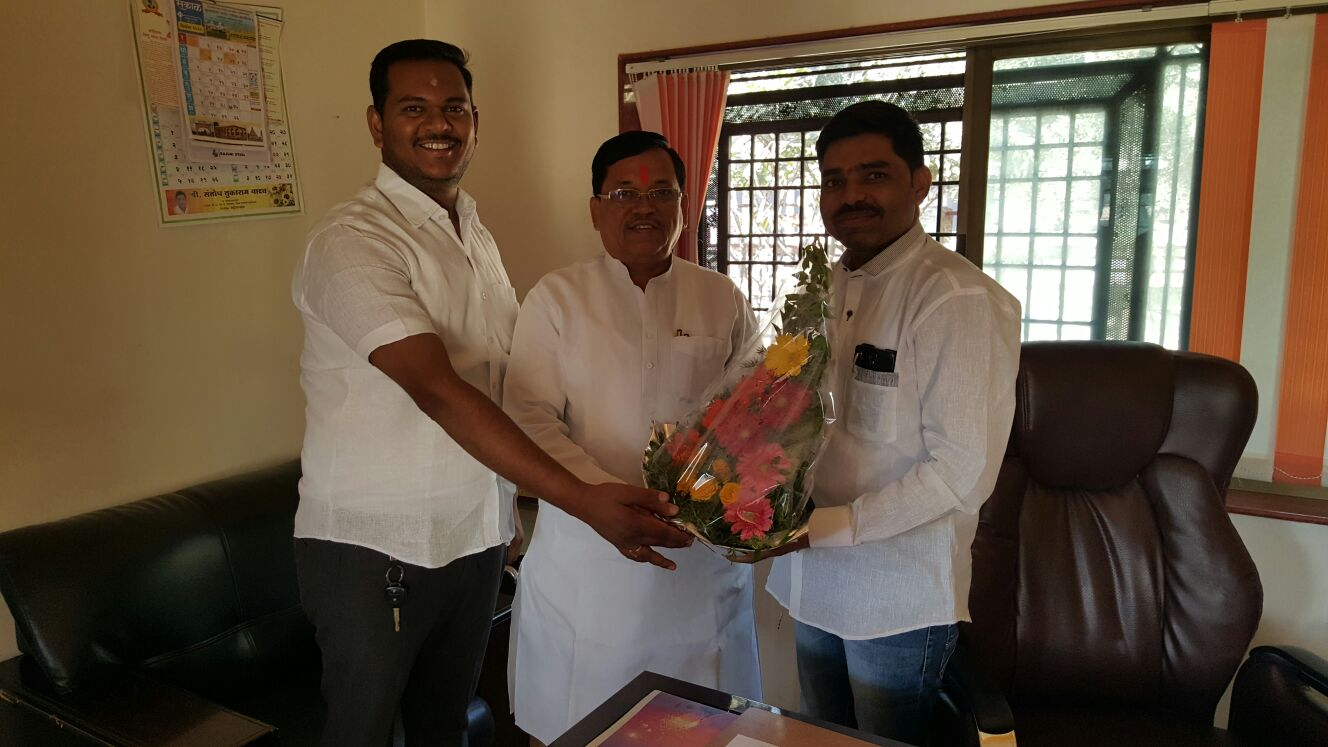
- Baburao with colleagues

Member of Maharashtra Legislative Assembly
- In office 2014–2019
- Preceded by: Ashok Raosaheb Pawar
- Succeeded by: Ashok Raosaheb Pawar
- Constituency: Shirur
- In office 2004–2009
- Preceded by: Popatrao Gawade
- Succeeded by: Ashok Raosaheb Pawar
- Constituency: Shirur

Personal details
- Party: Bharatiya Janata Party
- Education: Pune University
- Occupation: Politician

Baburao Pacharne (died 11 August 2022) was an Indian politician, who was a member of the Maharashtra Legislative Assembly from 2014 to 2019 and also from 2004 to 2009. A member of the Bharatiya Janata Party (BJP), Pacharne represented the Shirur, Maharashtra as a MLA. He foresaw the possibility of implementing organic farming in the Shirur Taluka. Pacharne messaged to all farmers to be given use of a formula of zero budget natural farming. He had a keen interest in researching new techniques related to natural farming. This resulted in the emergence of "Shivtara Zero Budget Natural Farming at Shirur".

== Death ==
He died on 11 August 2022 after a long battle with cancer at the age of 71.
