= Hadapsar Assembly constituency =

Constituency of the Maharashtra legislative assembly in India

Coordinates: 18.51°N 73.93°E

Hadapsar
- Constituency No. 213 for the Maharashtra Legislative Assembly

Constituency details
- Country: India
- Region: Western India
- State: Maharashtra
- District: Pune
- Lok Sabha constituency: Shirur
- Established: 2008
- Total electors: 625,938
- Reservation: None

Member of Legislative Assembly
- 15th Maharashtra Legislative Assembly
- Incumbent Chetan Tupe
- Party: NCP
- Alliance: NDA
- Elected year: 2024

Hadapsar Assembly constituency is one of the 288 Vidhan Sabha (legislative assembly) constituencies of Maharashtra. It is a part of the Shirur Lok Sabha constituency. Since 2019, its representative is Chetan Vitthal Tupe of the Nationalist Congress Party.

== Geographical scope ==
The constituency comprises ward no. 130 of Pune Municipal Corporation (Yerawada revenue circle (Mundhwa Saza) in Pune City taluka and ward nos. 17, 19 to 23, 26, 131 to 134, 137 to 139 of PMC.

== Members of the Legislative Assembly ==
Year	Member	Party
Until 2008: Constituency did not exist
2009	Mahadeo Babar	Shiv Sena
2014	Yogesh Tilekar	Bharatiya Janata Party
2019	Chetan Tupe	Nationalist Congress Party
2024	Chetan Tupe	Nationalist Congress Party

== Election results ==
=== Assembly Election 2024 ===
2024 Maharashtra Legislative Assembly election : Hadapsar
Party	Candidate	Votes	%	±%
NCP	Chetan Vitthal Tupe	134,810	42.86%	New
NCP-SP	Prashant Sudam Jagtap	1,27,688	40.60%	New
MNS	Babar Sainath Sambhaji	32,821	10.43%	▼4.33
Independent	Gangadhar Vitthal Badhe	6,584	2.09%	New
VBA	Adv. Afroz Mulla	3,641	1.16%	▼2.05
NOTA	None of the Above	2,946	0.94%	▼0.11
SDPI	Azhar Basha Tamboli	2,632	0.84%	New
Sambhaji Brigade Party	Shivaji Pushpalata Uttamrao Pawar	2,249	0.72%	New
Margin of victory		7,122	2.26%	▲1.07
Turnout		3,17,477	50.72%	▲3.51
Total valid votes		3,14,531		
Registered electors		6,25,938		▲24.13
NCP hold		Swing	▲3.69	

=== Assembly Election 2019 ===
2019 Maharashtra Legislative Assembly election : Hadapsar
Party	Candidate	Votes	%	±%
NCP	Chetan Vitthal Tupe	92,326	39.17%	▲25.35
BJP	Yogesh Tilekar	89,506	37.98%	▼0.18
MNS	Vasant (Tatya) Krushna More	34,809	14.77%	▲3.13
AIMIM	Zahid Ibrahim Shaikh	7,901	3.35%	New
VBA	Ghansham (Bapu ) Hakke	7,570	3.21%	New
NOTA	None of the Above	2,474	1.05%	▲0.31
Margin of victory		2,820	1.20%	▼12.77
Turnout		2,38,223	47.24%	▼5.22
Total valid votes		2,35,695		
Registered electors		5,04,259		▲20.97
NCP gain from BJP		Swing	▲1.02	

=== Assembly Election 2014 ===
2014 Maharashtra Legislative Assembly election : Hadapsar
Party	Candidate	Votes	%	±%
BJP	Yogesh Tilekar	82,629	38.15%	New
SS	Mahadeo Babar	52,381	24.18%	▼15.55
NCP	Chetan Vitthal Tupe	29,947	13.83%	New
MNS	Bhangire Pramod Alias Nana Vasant	25,206	11.64%	▼8.43
INC	Chandrakant Alias Balasaheb Shivarkar	22,100	10.20%	▼23.28
BSP	Gaikwad Ramesh Narayan	2,064	0.95%	▼0.41
NOTA	None of the Above	1,610	0.74%	New
Margin of victory		30,248	13.97%	▲7.71
Turnout		2,18,240	52.36%	▲6.54
Total valid votes		2,16,587		
Registered electors		4,16,840		▲14.83
BJP gain from SS		Swing	▼1.59	

=== Assembly Election 2009 ===
2009 Maharashtra Legislative Assembly election : Hadapsar
Party	Candidate	Votes	%	±%
SS	Mahadeo Babar	65,517	39.74%	New
INC	Shivarkar Chandrkant Vitthalrao	55,208	33.49%	New
MNS	Vasant (Tatya) Krushna More	33,092	20.07%	New
BSP	Magar Vikram Shivaji	2,255	1.37%	New
LJP	Bole Vasant Vithuji	1,332	0.81%	New
JD(S)	Vitthal Lakshman Satav	1,253	0.76%	New
Independent	Sunil Balkrishna Gaikwad	1,037	0.63%	New
Margin of victory		10,309	6.25%	
Turnout		1,64,891	45.42%	
Total valid votes		1,64,871		
Registered electors		3,63,007		
SS win (new seat)				
