= Chetan Tupe =

Indian politician

Chetan Vitthal Tupe

Member of the Maharashtra Legislative Assembly
- Incumbent
- Assumed office 2019
- Preceded by: Yogesh Tilekar
- Constituency: Hadapsar

Personal details
- Party: Nationalist Congress Party
- Profession: Politician

Chetan Vitthal Tupe (born 1971) is an Indian politician from Maharashtra. He is a member of the Maharashtra Legislative Assembly from Hadapsar Assembly constituency in Pune district. He won the 2019 Maharashtra Legislative Assembly election, representing the Nationalist Congress Party.

== Early life and education ==
Tupe is from Hadapsar, Pune district, Maharashtra. His father, Vitthal Baburao Tupe, was a farmer and a well known politician. He completed Class 10 in 1986 at Nutan Marathi School, Pune, and dropped out of studies while doing plus two at F.Y.J.C. Laxmanrao Apte School, Pune, in 1991.

== Career ==
Tupe won from Hadaspar Assembly constituency, representing the Nationalist Congress Party in the 2019 Maharashtra Legislative Assembly election. He polled 93,326 votes and defeated his nearest rival, Yogesh Tilekar of the Bharatiya Janata Party, by a margin of 2,820 votes. He retained the seat for the Nationalist Congress Party winning for a second term in the 2024 Maharashtra Legislative Assembly election. In 2024, he polled 134,810 votes and defeated the second placed Prashant Jagtap of the Nationalist Congress Party (SP), by a margin of 7,122 votes.

In July 2024, he raised concerns about the destruction of Flamingo habitats in his constituency region due to urbanization, and in response, the forest minister announced the formation of a committee to protect Flamingo bird habitats.
