= Babaji Kale =

Indian politician

Babaji Ramchandra Kale
- बाबाजी रामचंद्र काळे

Member of Maharashtra Legislative Assembly
- Incumbent
- Assumed office 8 December 2024
- Governor: Acharya Devvrat
- Preceded by: Dilip Mohite
- Constituency: Khed Alandi Assembly constituency

Personal details
- Born: July 1, 1970 (age 55)
- Parent: Ramchandra Dondiba Kale

Babaji Ramchandra Kale (born 1970) is an Indian politician from Maharashtra. He is a member of the 15th Maharashtra Legislative Assembly from Khed Alandi Assembly constituency in Pune District. He won the 2024 Maharashtra Legislative Assembly election representing the Shiv Sena (UBT).

== Early life and education ==
Kale is from Padali village of Khed (Rajgurunagar) taluka in Pune District, Maharashtra. He is the son of Ramchandra Dhondiba Kale. He completed his Bachelor of Engineering in Civil in 1992 at Pune.

== Career ==
Kale was a Civil Contractor. He was previously Member of Zilla Parishad, Pune from Sandbhor-Kalus Ward.

Kale won from Khed Alandi Assembly constituency representing the Shiv Sena (UBT) Party in the 2024 Maharashtra Legislative Assembly election. He polled 150,152 votes and defeated his nearest rival, Dilip Dattatray Mohite of the Nationalist Congress Party (SP), by a margin of 51,743 votes. The constituency also saw 13 other candidates including VBA’s Ravindra Rahul Randhave and Aniket Murlidhar Gore of the Bahujan Samaj Party in the fray.
