= Dnyaneshwar Katke =

Indian politician

Dnyaneshwar Katke (born 1977), alias Mauli Aba Katke, is an Indian politician from Maharashtra. He is a Member of 15th Maharashtra Legislative Assembly from Shirur Assembly constituency in Pune District. He won the 2024 Maharashtra Legislative Assembly election representing the Nationalist Congress Party.

== Early life and education ==
Katke is from Shirur, Pune District, Maharashtra. He is the son of Pandharinath Kisanrao Katke. He passed Class 12 in 1995 at Shri Shivaji Maratha Memorial of Society, Pune, Maharashtra.

== Career ==
Katke won from Shirur Assembly constituency representing the Nationalist Congress Party in the 2024 Maharashtra Legislative Assembly election. He polled 192,281 votes and defeated his nearest rival, Ashok Raosaheb Pawar of the Nationalist Congress Party (SP), by a margin of 74,550 votes. He was a former district president of the Shiv Sena (Uddhav Balasaheb Thackeray) party and he joined the Nationalist Congress Party just before the elections in October 2024.
