= Jurmana (1996 film) =

1996 film by T L V Prasad

Jurmana (1996)
- Theatrical release poster
- Directed by: T L V Prasad
- Written by: T L V Prasad
- Produced by: Kalyaani Singh
- Starring: Mithun Chakraborty; Rambha; Shakti Kapoor; Ronit Roy; Raza Murad
- Cinematography: S. Nava Kanth
- Edited by: Govind Dalwadi
- Music by: Dilip Sen-Sameer Sen
- Production company: Right Image International
- Release date: 5 January 1996
- Running time: 134 minutes
- Country: India
- Language: Hindi
- Budget: ₹2.25 crore
- Box office: ₹9.97 crore

Jurmana is a 1996 Indian Hindi-language action film produced by Kalyaani Singh, presented by Maann Singh, and directed by T L V Prasad, starring Mithun Chakraborty, Ronit Roy, Rambha, Ashwini Bhave, Kiran Kumar, Shakti Kapoor and Raza Murad.

== Plot ==
The family action film is a story about the love between Inspector Vijay Saxena and Priya Kumari Tiwari. Inspector Vijay Saxena and Priya Kumari Tiwari are in love. The only obstacle is that Priya's dad is wealthy and the Chief Minister of the state, while Vijay's background is lower middle-class. Humiliated by Tiwari, Vijay marries advocate Kiran, and together they give birth to a daughter named Bobby. Kiran represents a number of defendants who are charged by the police, and is always on hand to secure their release, and this causes some acrimony in their marriage. Then an unmarried Priya re-enters Vijay's life, and this time she intends to stay close to this family. Tragedy strikes the Saxena family when Kiran is killed by assailants. With the police having no clues as to who her killers are, Vijay takes it upon himself to bring the culprits to justice. It is then he finds out that Bobby has been kidnapped, and the only way he can save her is by turning himself in to her kidnappers.

== Cast ==
- Mithun Chakraborty as Police Inspector Vijay Saxena
- Rambha as Priya Kumari Saxena Khandan
- Shakti Kapoor as J.J.
- Ronit Roy as Sanjay Saxena (Vijay's brother)
- Kanchan as Pooja
- Anil Nagrath as Police Commissioner Roopchand
- Shashi Kiran as Police Inspector Sadanand
- Vishwajeet Pradhan as J.J.’s brother
- Raza Murad as Chief Minister Tiwari
- Ashwini Bhave as Advocate Kiran Saxena
- Kiran Kumar as Police Commissioner Gorakh Nath
- Gavin Packard as Rona
- Akela Singh
- Baby Nikita as Bobby
- Brijesh Tiwari
- Anup Biswas

== Music ==
1. "Tere Pyar Mein Dil Ye" - Udit Narayan, Sadhana Sargam
2. "Dil Deewana Ho Gaya" - Kavita Krishnamurthy
3. "Sun Meri Jaane Jaana" - Udit Narayan, Aditya Narayan, Kalyaani Singh
4. "Sard Raaton Mein Yu" - Poornima
5. "Teri Patli Kamar" - Udit Narayan
6. "Mirchi Re Mirchi" - Sudesh Bhosle, Poornima

== Box office ==
Made on a budget of ₹2.25 crore, Jurmana grossed ₹9.97 crore at the worldwide box office.
