= Amol Kolhe =

Indian actor and politician (born 1980)

Dr. Amol Ramsing Kolhe
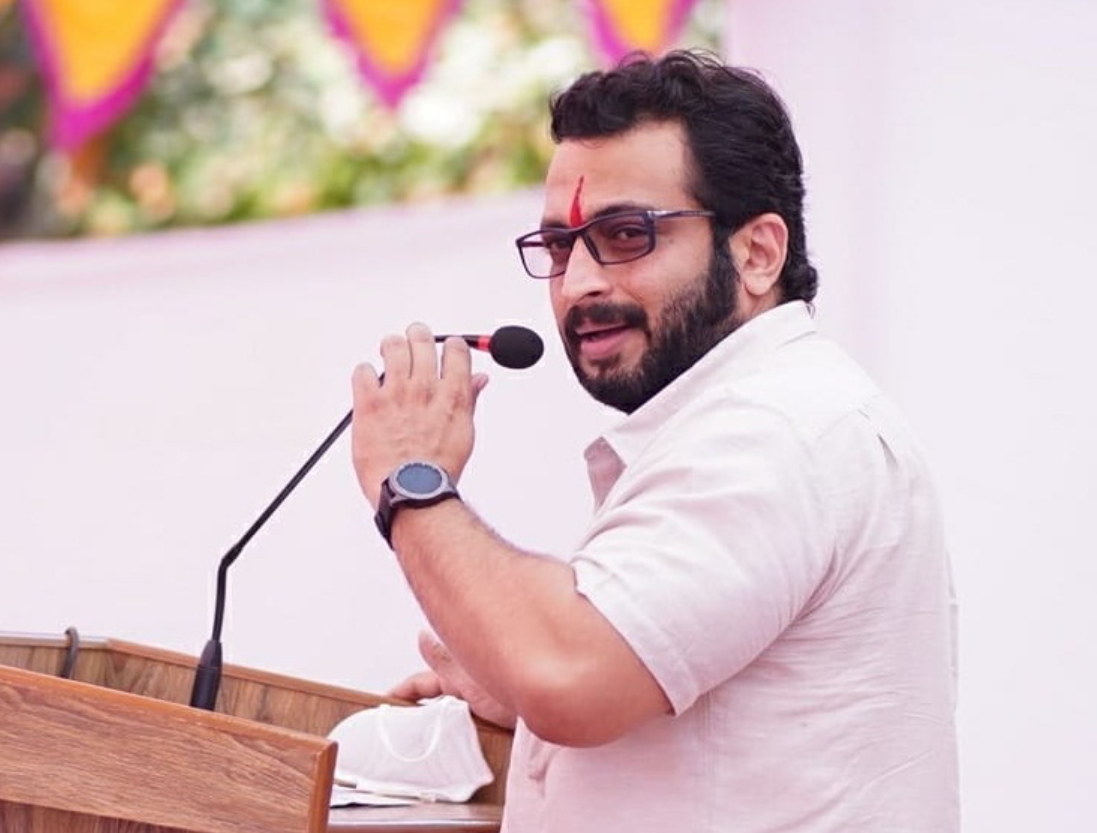

Member of Parliament, Lok Sabha
- Incumbent
- Assumed office 23 May 2019
- Preceded by: Shivajirao Adhalarao Patil
- Constituency: Shirur, Maharashtra

Deputy Leader of the Nationalist Congress Party (SP) in the Lok Sabha
- Incumbent
- Assumed office 3 July 2024
- Leader: Supriya Sule

Chief Whip of the Nationalist Congress Party (SP) in the Lok Sabha
- Incumbent
- Assumed office 3 July 2024

Personal details
- Born: 18 September 1980 (age 45) Narayangaon, Maharashtra, India
- Party: Nationalist Congress Party (Sharadchandra Pawar) (since 2024)
- Other political affiliations: Nationalist Congress Party (2019–2024); Shiv Sena (2014–2019)
- Spouse: Ashwini Kolhe (m. 2007)
- Children: 2
- Education: MBBS
- Profession: Actor; doctor; politician

Dr. Amol Ramsing Kolhe (born 18 September 1980) is an Indian actor-turned-politician who is the current Member of Parliament in the Lok Sabha from Shirur and a member of the Nationalist Congress Party – Sharadchandra Pawar.

== Early life ==
Kolhe was born in the town of Narayangaon in Pune district. He attended Apte School in Pune from 9th to 12th grade. After High school, he earned an MBBS degree from Seth G.S. Medical College and King Edward Memorial Hospital, Mumbai.

== Acting career ==
He is popular for his role of Chhatrapati Shivaji in Marathi TV Shows Raja Shivchhatrapati which aired on Star Pravah and Swarajyajanani Jijamata which aired on Sony Marathi. He played Chhatrapati Sambhaji in the Marathi TV Series Swarajyarakshak Sambhaji on Zee Marathi. In 2017 he played the controversial role of Nathuram Godse in the film Why I Killed Gandhi.

== Political career ==
Kolhe was a star campaigner for Shiv Sena in the 2014 Indian general election, but joined the Nationalist Congress Party in February 2019. In the 2019 Indian general election, he defeated Shivajirao Adhalarao Patil of Shiv Sena and was elected as a Member of Parliament from Shirur.

== Filmography ==
Year	Film
2008	Mee Amruta Boltey
2009	Mulga
2010	Aaghaat
2010	On Duty 24 Tass
2011	Rajmata Jijau
2012	Saheb
2013	Rangkarmi
2013	Are Avaaj Konacha
2014	Rama Madhav
2016	Marathi tigers
2017	Why I Killed Gandhi
2019	Bola Alak Niranjan
2022	Shivpratap Garudjhep

== Television ==
Year	Title	Role
2006-2007	Adhuri Ek Kahani	Divakar
2008-2009	Raja Shivchhatrapati	Chhatrapati Shivaji Maharaj
2012	Veer Shivaji	Chhatrapati Shivaji Maharaj
2017-2020	Swarajyarakshak Sambhaji	Sambhaji Maharaj
2020-2021	Swarajyajanani Jijamata	Chhatrapati Shivaji Maharaj
2026	Mi Savitribai Jotirao Phule	Jyotirao Phule
