= Mahesh Landge =

Indian politician from Maharashtra

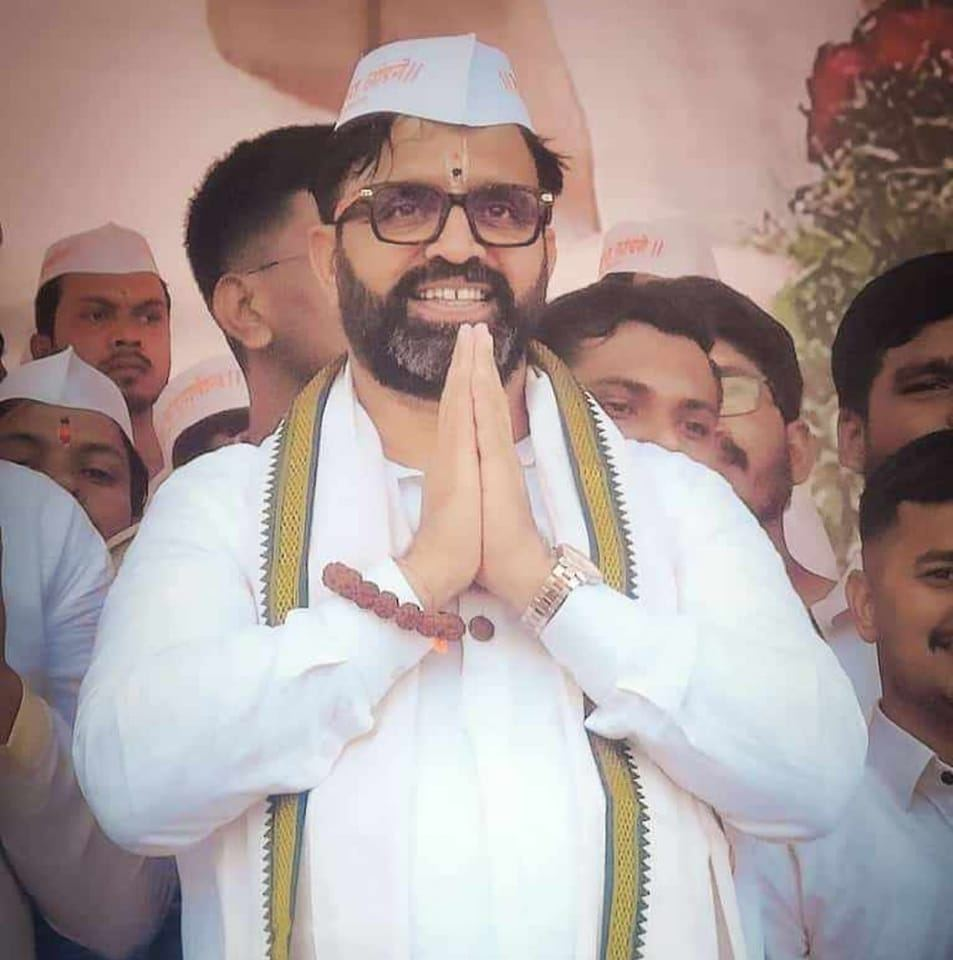

Member of the Maharashtra Legislative Assembly
- Incumbent
- Assumed office 2014
- Preceded by: Vilas Vithoba lande
- Constituency: Bhosari Assembly constituency

President of Bharatiya Janata Party Pimpri-Chinchwad City
- In office 16 January 2020 – 2023

Personal details
- Born: Mahesh Kisanrao Landge; 27 November 1975 (age 50) Bhosari, Poona district, (now Pune district) Maharashtra, India
- Citizenship: Indian
- Party: Bharatiya Janata Party (2014-present)
- Other political affiliations: Nationalist Congress Party (till 2014)
- Spouse: Pooja Maheshdada Landge
- Children: Malhar Maheshdada Landge and Sakshi Ninad Bhondve
- Education: Savitribai Phule Pune University
- Occupation: Politician

Mahesh Kisanrao Landge (born 27 November 1975) is an Indian politician. He is currently a member of the Maharashtra Legislative Assembly representing Bhosari Vidhan sabha constituency in the Pune district.

== Political career ==
Before entering politics, Landge was a wrestler. His political career began with National Students' Union of India (NSUI), student wing of Indian National Congress. In 2002, he contested his first election for the position of corporator but was defeated. However, he won a by-election in 2004 and became a corporator in Pimpri Chinchwad Municipal Corporation (PCMC).

Landge served as a corporator for three consecutive terms as a member of Nationalist Congress Party (NCP). In 2014, after being denied a ticket by the NCP for Bhosari Assembly Constituency, he contested the election as an independent candidate. He won the election and subsequently joined Bhartiya Janata Party (BJP).

Mahesh became a member of the Rashtriya Swayamsevak Sangh (RSS), a far-right Hindu nationalist paramilitary volunteer organisation.

In the 2019 Maharashtra Legislative Assembly elections, Landge was re-elected as a BJP candidate from Bhosari.

=== Positions held ===
- 2004-2014: Corporator, Pimpri Chinchwad Municipal Corporation (three consecutive terms)
- 2014-2019: Member of the Maharashtra Legislative Assembly, Bhosari (Independent candidate, later joined BJP)
- 2019-2024: Member of the Maharashtra Legislative Assembly, Bhosari (BJP)
- 2024–present: Member of the Maharashtra Legislative Assembly, Bhosari (BJP)
- 2020-2023: City president, BJP Pimpri-Chinchwad

== Electoral history ==
Election candidature history in Maharashtra Legislative Assembly election
| Year | Party BJP | Constituency | Opponent | | Result | Margin |
|---|---|---|---|---|---|---|
| 2014 | Independent | Bhosari | SS | Ubale Rambhau | Won | 15,314 |
| 2019 | BJP | Bhosari | Independent | Vilas Lande | Won | 77,567 |
| 2024 | BJP | Bhosari | NCP-SP | Ajit Damodar Gavhane | Won | 63,765 |
