= Hadapsar =

- Suburb
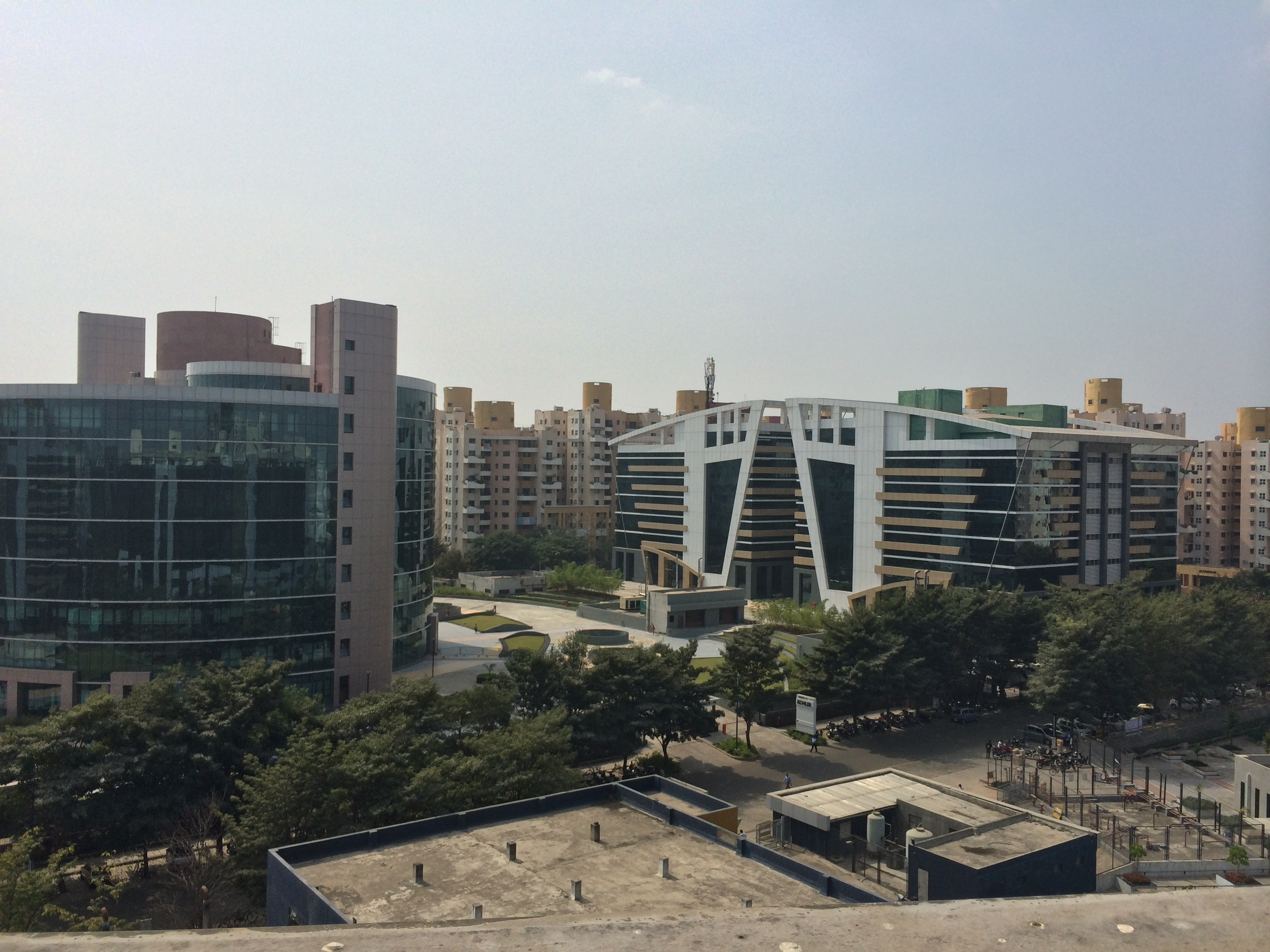
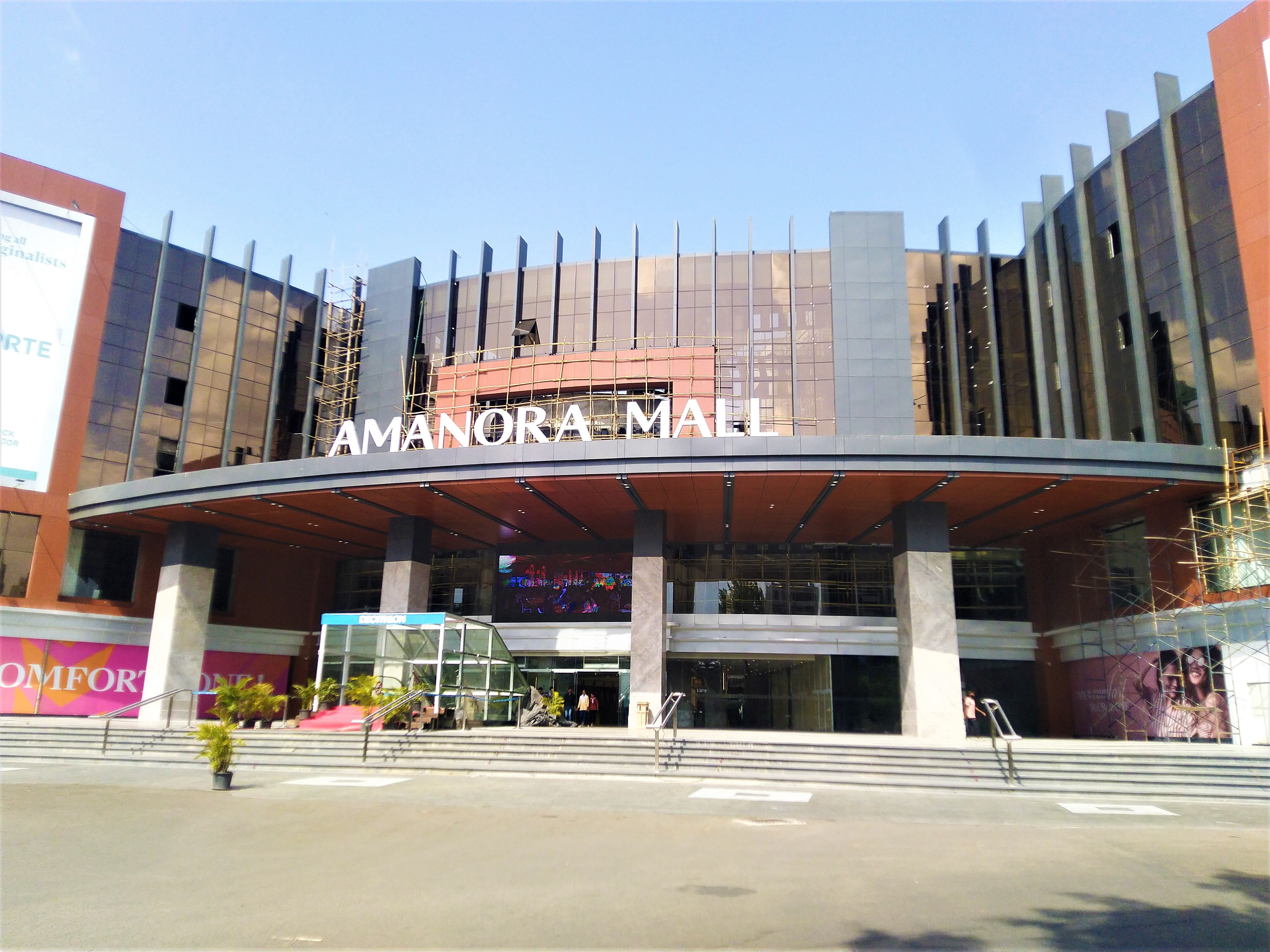
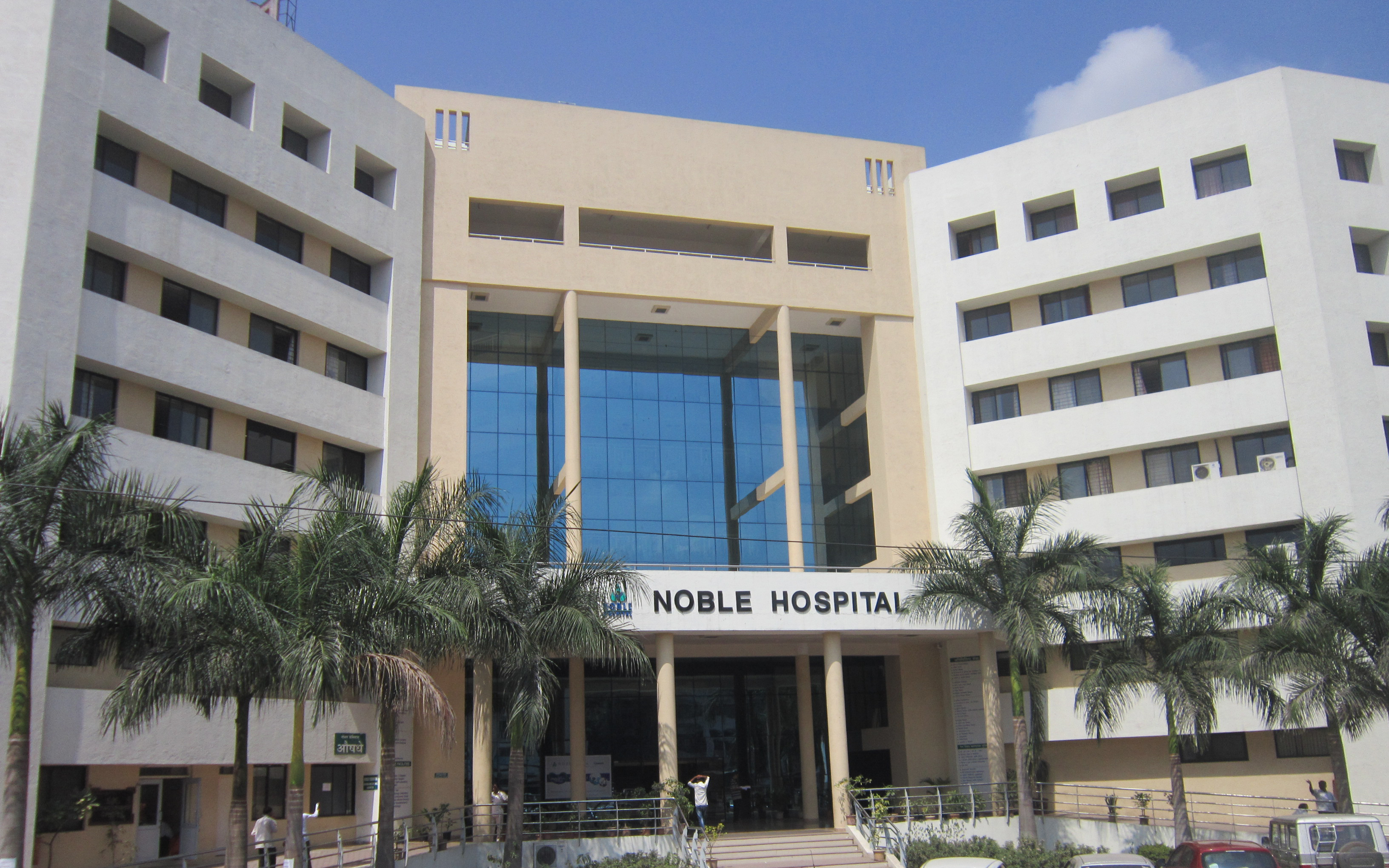
- Magarpatta, Amanora, Noble Hospital

- Location in Maharashtra, India
- Coordinates: 18°29′48″N 73°56′30″E
- Country: India
- State: Maharashtra
- District: Pune

Population
  - Total: 300,000

Languages
  - Official: Marathi
- Time zone: UTC+5:30 (IST)
- PIN: 411028 and 411013
- Telephone code: 020
- Vehicle registration: MH-12
- Literacy: 95%
- Lok Sabha constituency: Shirur
- Vidhan Sabha constituency: Hadapsar

Hadapsar is a developed suburb in eastern Pune City, Maharashtra, India. Since 1990, Hadapsar developed into a major industrial area and is now one of the developed areas of Pune. It is well connected to all parts of city.

== History ==
During the 2nd Anglo-Maratha war, a battle was fought between Maharaj Yashwantrao Holkar and Peshwa Baji Rao II and Daulat Rao Scindia in which Yaswantrao defeated the combined army of Peshwa and Scindia at Hadapsar in 25 October 1802. This battle is known as the Battla of Poona.

== Industry ==
Hadapsar is home to corporations such as Serum Institute of India, the MMR department, Honeywell, Bharat Forge, Gits Food Products, Indian Hume Pipe Factory, EDP, and Accurate. It is also home to the Hadapsar Industrial Estate.

Hadapsar has 3 special economic zones (SEZ): Magarpatta, Amanora Park Town, and SP Infocity.

Seasons Mall is a shopping mall located on the outskirts of Magarpatta, which hosts the largest multiplex in India with 15 screens.

Amanora Town Centre/Amanora Mall is a Shopping mall in Amanora Park Town. It is a gated community spread over 400 acres. Amanora Park Town contains Pune's tallest buildings.

== Transport ==
=== Rail ===
Hadapsar railway station serves Hadapsar and local trains travelling Southbound towards Daund Junction/Solapur stop here. Pune Junction railway station also provides more rail services. Currently, Hadapsar railway station is running facilities for tourists traveling from and to South Maharashtra and India. It acts as a satellite station to Pune.

=== Road ===
Hadapsar is located along the Mumbai Hyderabad National Highway, also known as NH65, which also connects Pune and Solapur. It is also well connected to Pune Nagar highway through Kharadi bypass.

Hadapsar Gadital is very well known central bus station and is connected to every location of the city by PMPML MSRTC buses. The PMPML also operates AC buses on the many routes including Katraj-Hadapsar BRT Route, Hinjewadi, Nigdi and Wagholi. State Transport buses have a stopover on Solapur and Saswad national highways.

== Tukai Tekdi ==
It is a hill located south to Hadapsar. It is named after goddess Tukai whose temple is situated on the hills.
