= Amanora Park Town =

Human settlement in India

- Amanora
- Interactive map of the Amanora Park Town area

General information
- Type: Integrated Special Township
- Location: Hadapsar, Pune
- Coordinates: 18°31′07″N 73°56′23″E
- Owner: Social ownership
- Management: The City Corporation Limited

Design and construction
- Architect: Integrid Design Consultants Pvt Ltd Architects
- Developer: The City Corporation Limited
- Structural engineer: Y. S. Sane Associates, Pune

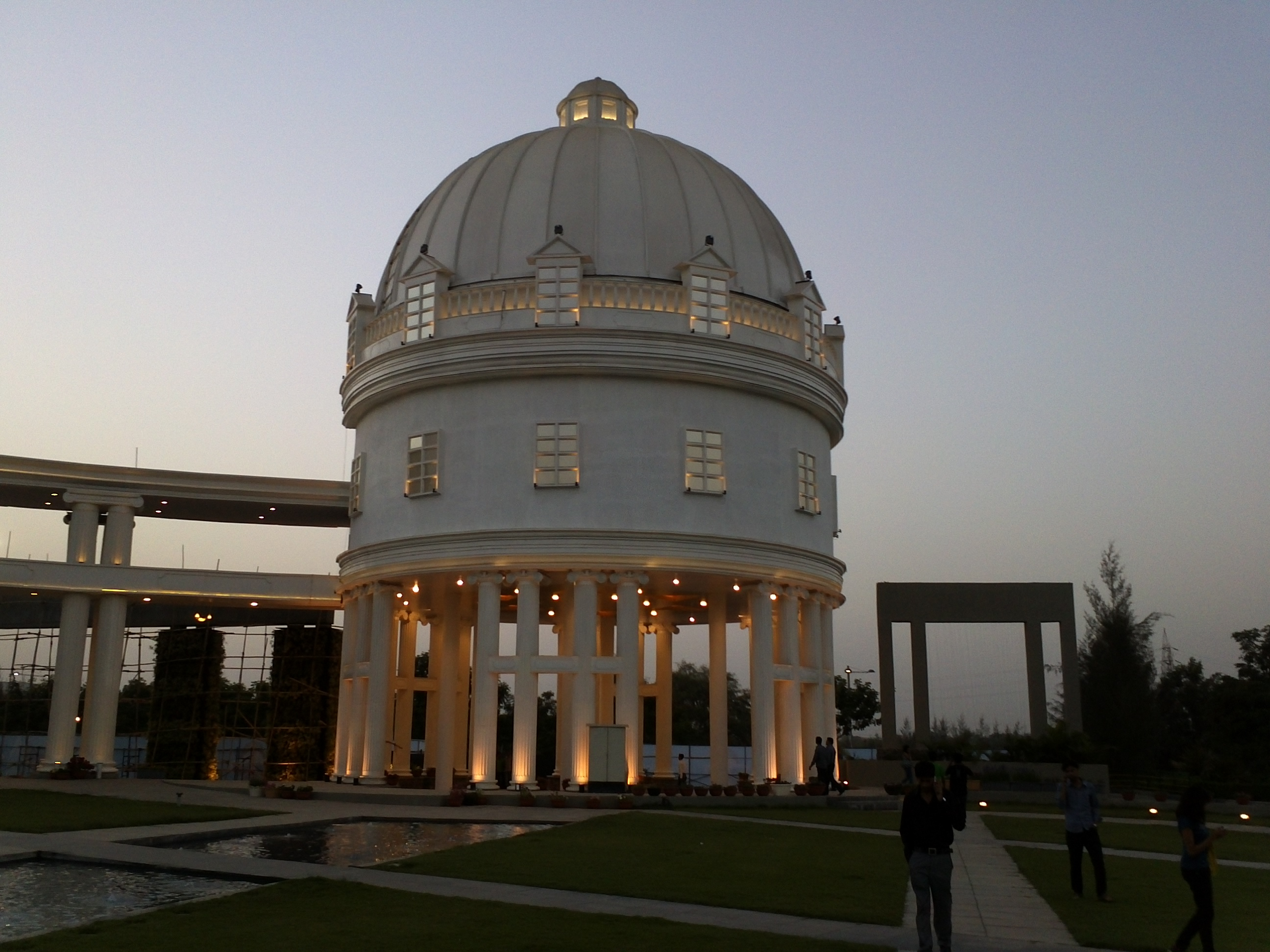
Amanora City clubhouse

Amanora Park Town is a residential township project in Hadapsar, Pune. The project is developed by the City Corporation Limited. The project is built over 400 acres of land with an independent sewage management system and separate power grid.

Notably, the Township is built with smart infrastructure, Smart access cards, Sustainable electricity, public transport etc.

The township project comes under the Government of Maharashtra's special township policy.

Amanora Chambers, a juncture for multiple start-ups and offices, is a part of Amanora township.

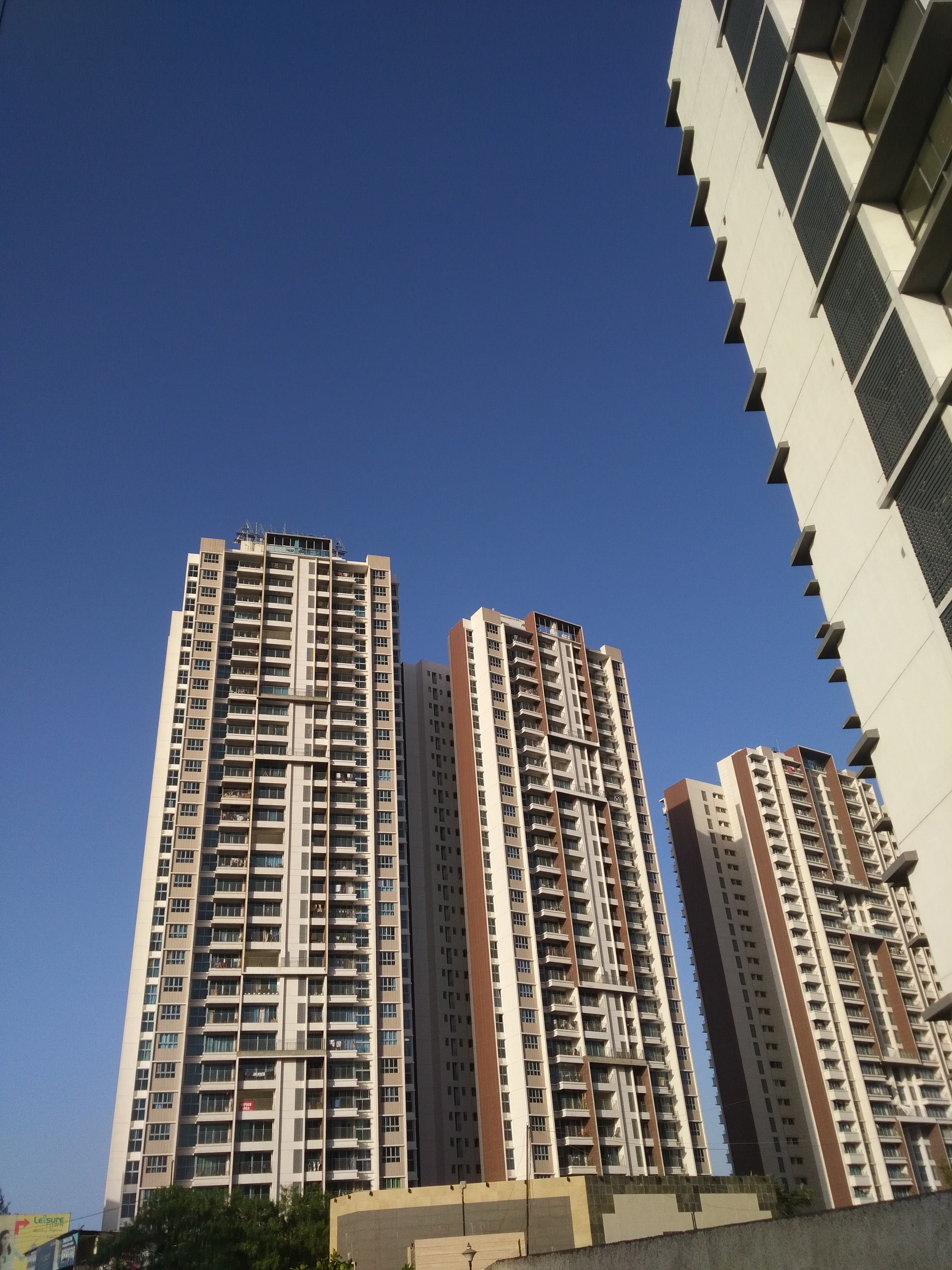
High rises at Amanora Township

== Awards ==
- ‘Best Affordable Housing’ at City level award by CNBC Awaz (Metro Towers)
- ‘High Rise Architecture’ award in Asia Pacific Awards, Singapore (Gateway Towers)
- ‘Best Shopping Mall’ in CREDAI 2013 Awards (Amanora Town Centre)

== Projects ==
- Future Towers
- Desire Towers
- Trendy Towers
- Aspire Towers
- Sterling Towers
- Adreno Towers
- Neo Towers
- Gold Towers
- Ascent Towers
- Crown Towers
- Sweetwater Villas
- Elevate Towers
- Gateway Towers
- Metro Towers
- City Rise
- Arbano Towers
- Gateway Towers Phase II
- Victory Towers

== Schools ==
- Pawar Public School
- Amanora School
- Chatrabhuj Narsee
- Angels Paradise Preschool & Daycare

== Offices ==
- Amanora Ascent Avenue
- Amanora Chambers
- Amanora Apex

== Food ==
- Amanora Mall
- Amanora Plaza
