= Royal Connaught Boat Club =

Rowing club in Pune, India

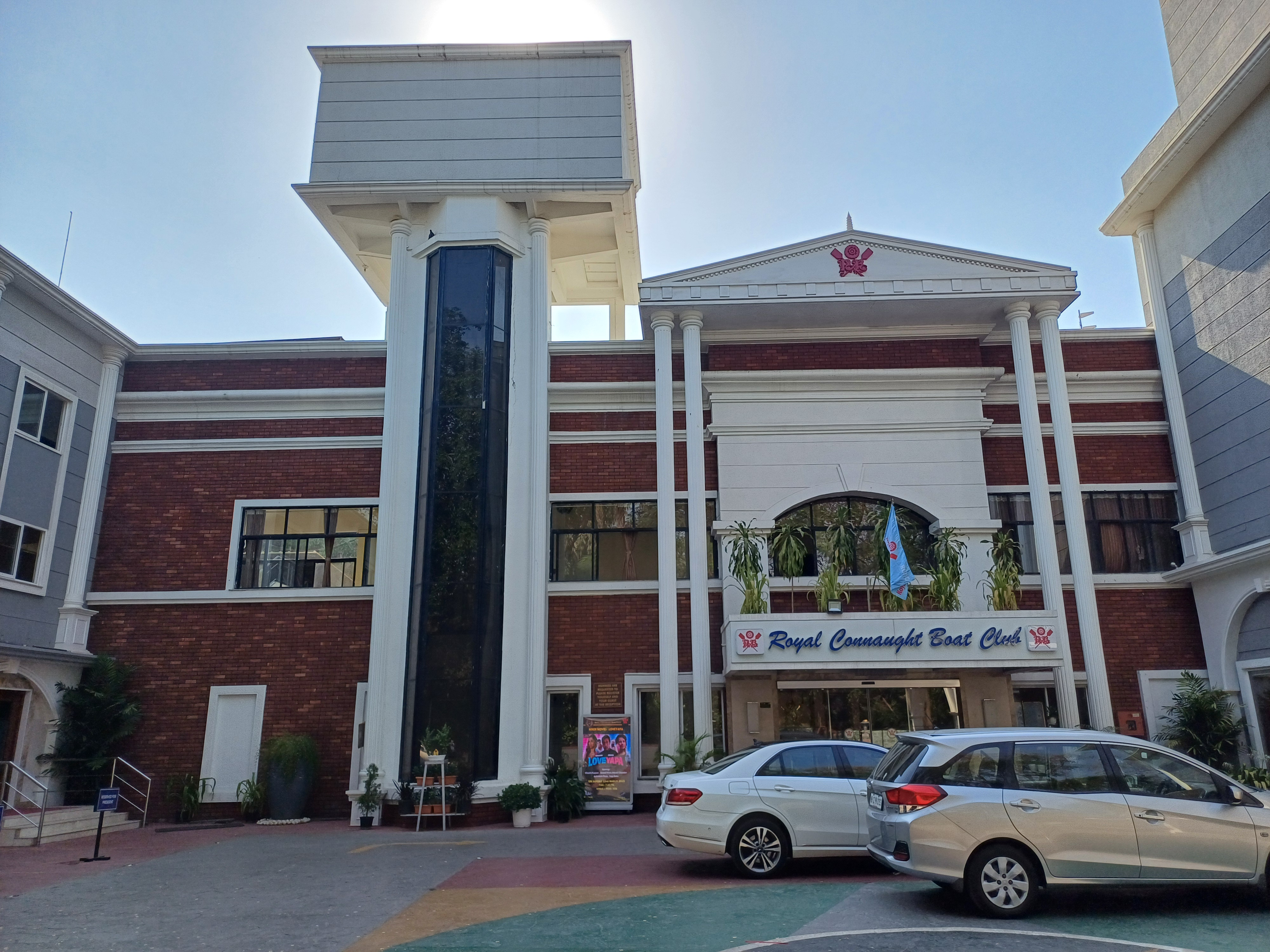
- Location: Pune, Maharashtra, India
- Coordinates: 18.5411°N 73.8803°E
- Home water: Mula-Mutha River
- Founded: 1868
- Former names: Poona Boat Club; Poona Royal Connaught Boat Club
- Website: boatclubpune.com

The Royal Connaught Boat Club (RCBC) was founded in 1868 in Pune, India. It is located on Boat Club Road.

The club provides facilities for water sports, including rowing, with a boathouse and slipway down to the southern side of the Mula-Mutha River, just below the confluence of the Mula River and the Mutha River.

== History ==
The club was founded as the Poona Boat Club in 1868. It merged with the Kirkee Boat Club in 1883 and the Royal Artillery Boat Club in 1888. Prince Arthur, Duke of Connaught and Strathearn, took an interest in the club whilst Commander-in-Chief of the Bombay Army, and the club was renamed as the 'Poona Royal Connaught Boat Club' in his honour in 1889. 'Poona' was dropped from the club name in 1928.

The club house was initially at Rosherville on the north bank at the confluence of the Mutha and Mulla rivers, near to Kirkee. The club had its main boat shed at the club's present site, near to the bund constructed in 1859 to supply Pune with water. The club leased its present site until 1876 when it purchased the freehold and redeveloped it, reopening in 1883.

In 1904, the club had an average of 170 members and admission was by ballot. The quarterly membership fee was Rs.12 plus an entrance donation of Rs.25. By the 1940s, the club had a membership of 89, including 23 Indian members and 2 women members. On Indian independence in 1947, the club elected to be wound up, citing declining interest in rowing and sailing and a poor financial position. This was, however, challenged by its remaining Indian members and a prolonged legal battle ensued. Activities at the club ceased until 1956 and the legal disputes were finally resolved in 1967.

== Club colours ==
During the British Raj, the club colours were dark blue, including a dark blue cap and a dark blue jacket with crimson edging. The club badge was a Tudor Crown and a rose.

== Gallery ==
The club badge featuring a rose ensigned by the Tudor Crown

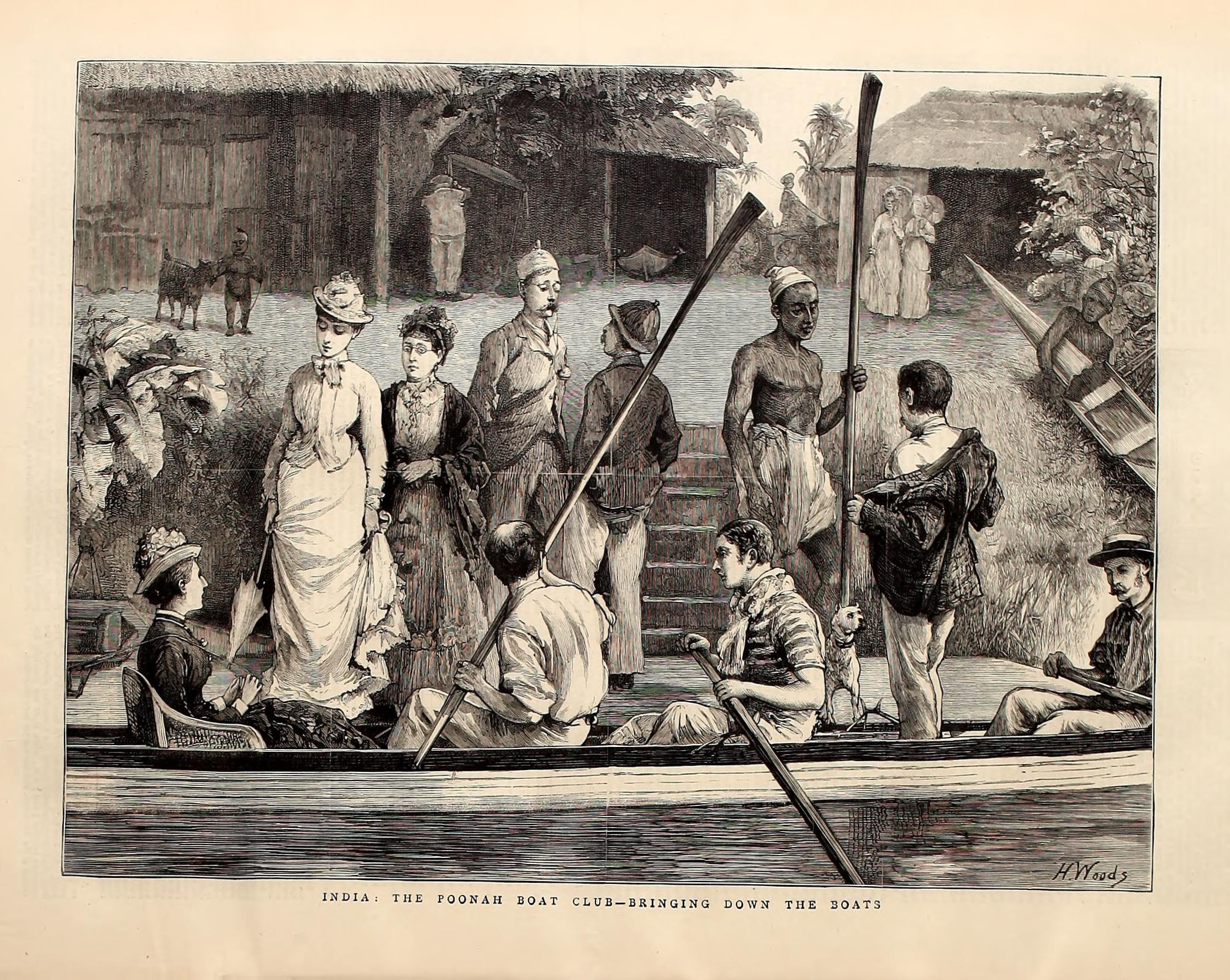
An 1877 depiction of the club captioned 'The Poonah Boat Club—Bringing Down the Boats'

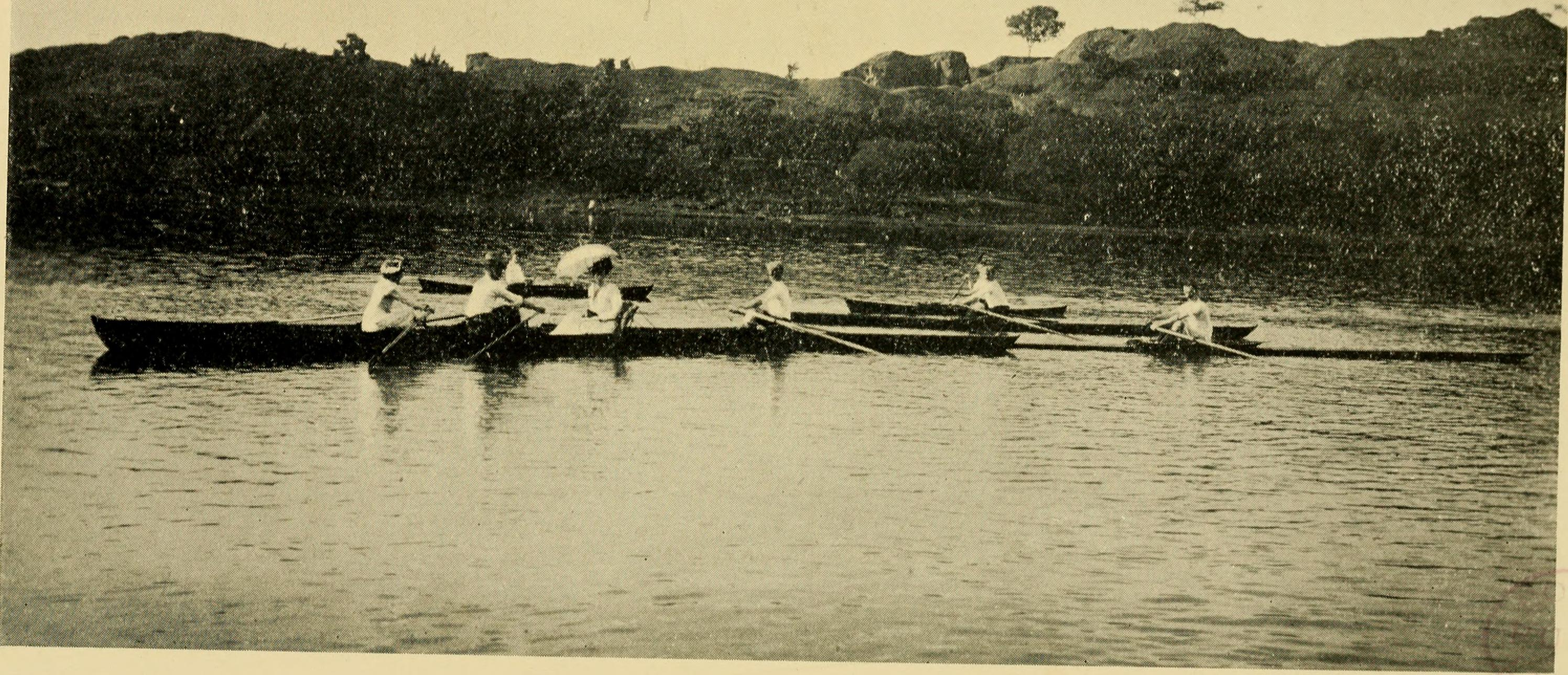
Photograph from The Sportsman's Book for India (1904)

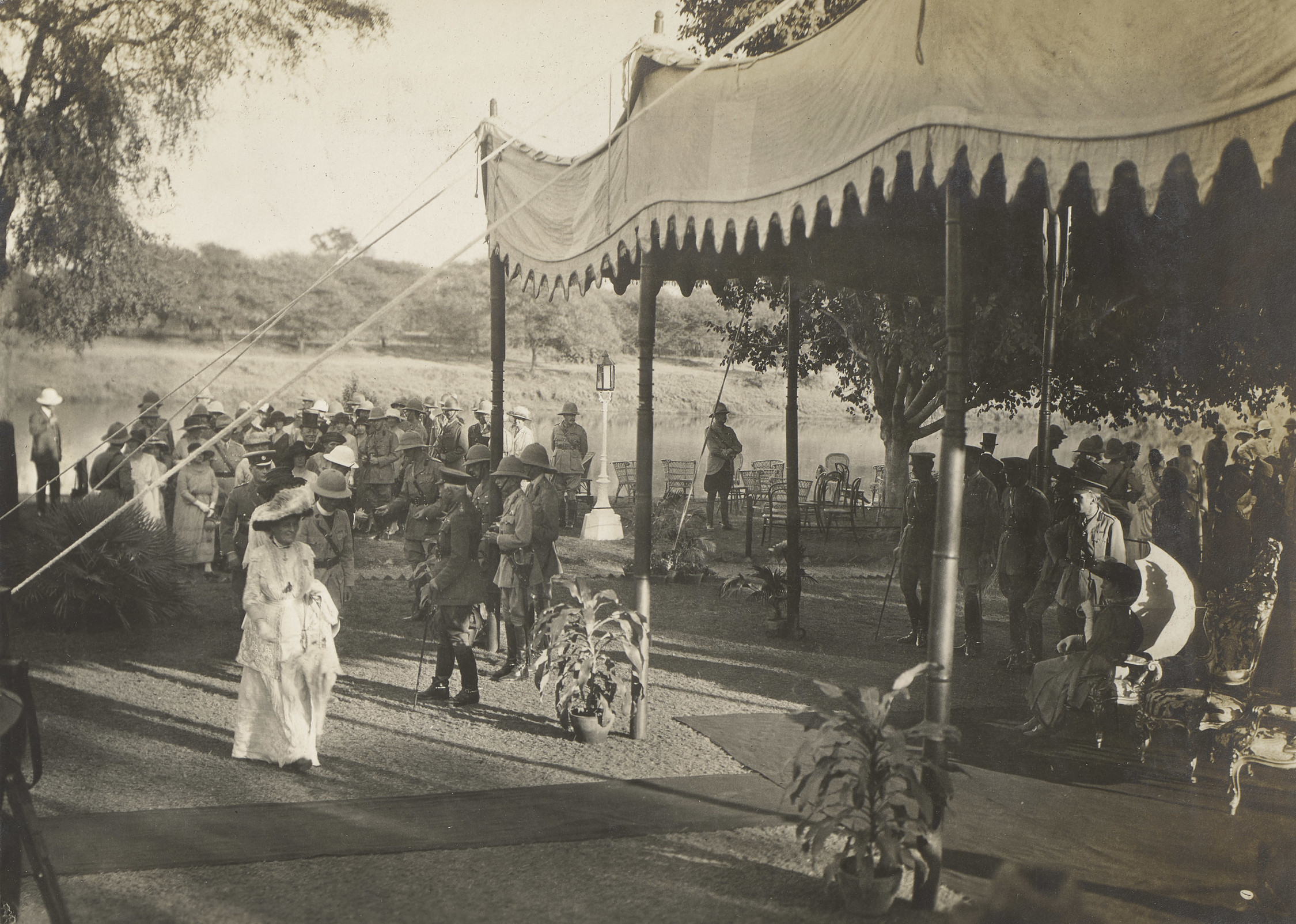
The Duke of Connaught receiving guests at a garden party at the club during a visit to India in 1921

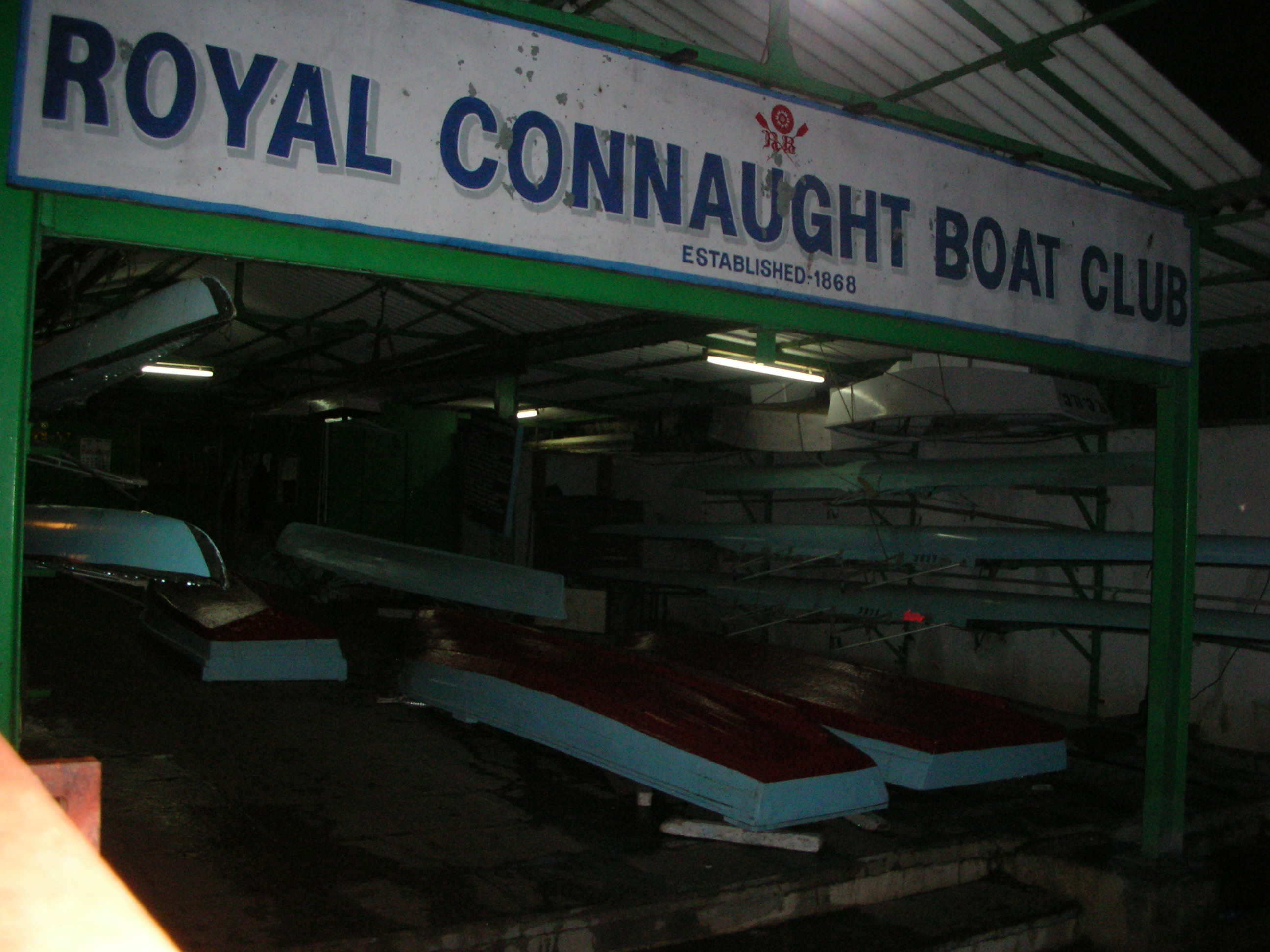
The boathouse interior in 2006

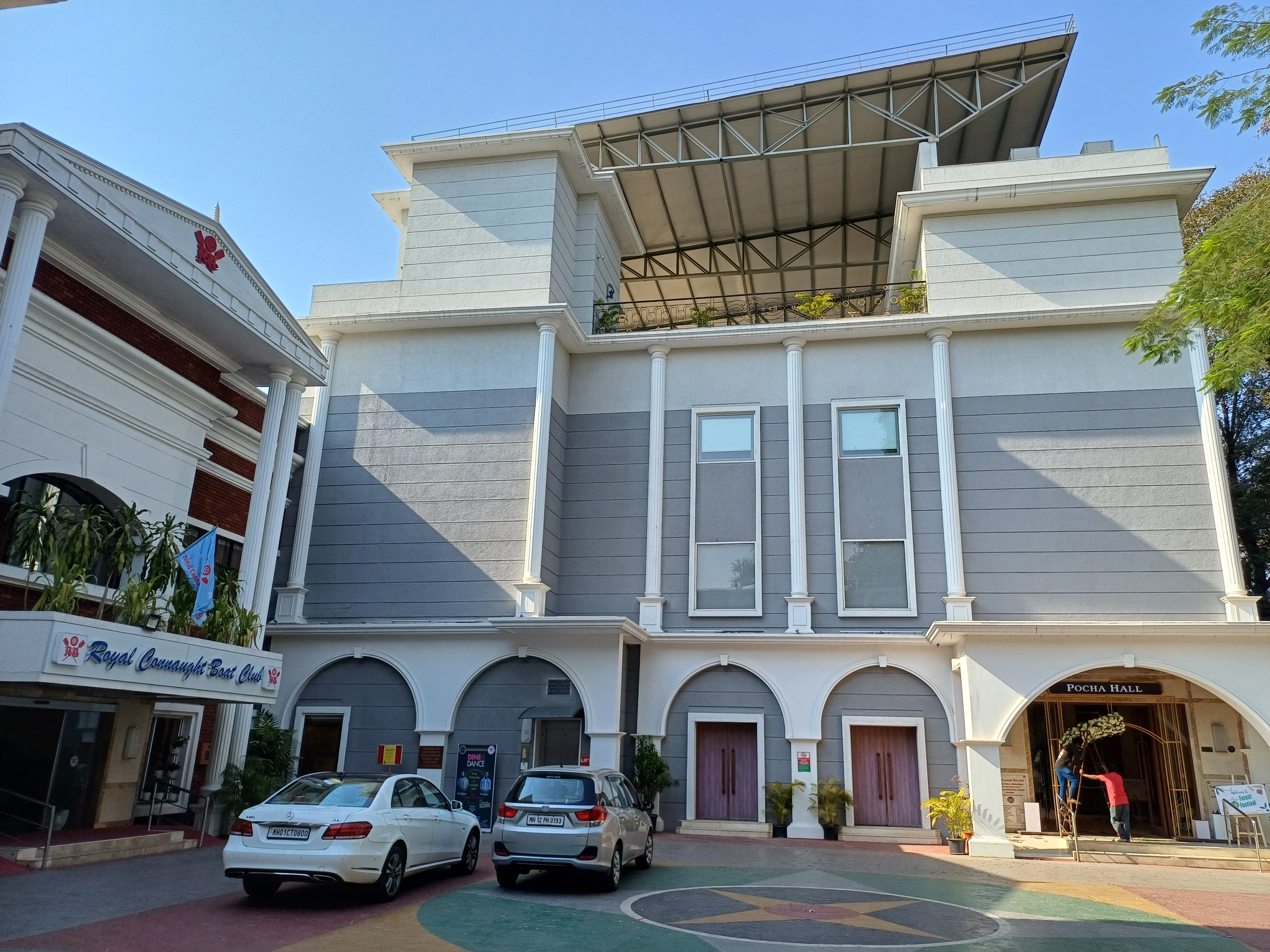
The club facilities and main entrance in 2025
